= 1966 Wimbledon Championships – Men's doubles =

Men's doubles
- 1966 Wimbledon Championships

Final
- Champions: (Australia) Ken Fletcher (Australia) John Newcombe
- Runners-up: (Australia) Bill Bowrey (Australia) Owen Davidson
- Score: 6–3, 6–4, 3–6, 6–3

Details
- Draw: 64 (5 Q )
- Seeds: 4

Events
Singles	men	women		boys	girls
Doubles	men	women	mixed	boys	girls
← 1965 ·	Wimbledon Championships	· 1967 →

John Newcombe and Tony Roche were the defending champions, but Roche did not compete. Newcombe partnered with Ken Fletcher, and they defeated Bill Bowrey and Owen Davidson in the final, 6–3, 6–4, 3–6, 6–3 to win the gentlemen's doubles tennis title at the 1966 Wimbledon Championship.

== Seeds ==
1. (Australia) Roy Emerson / (Australia) Fred Stolle (third round, withdrew)
2. n/a
3. (United States) Clark Graebner / (United States) Marty Riessen (semifinals)
4. (Australia) Bill Bowrey / (Australia) Owen Davidson (final)

Click on the seed number of a player to go to their draw section.

== Draw ==
=== Key ===
- Q = Qualifier
- WC = Wild card
- LL = Lucky loser
- Alt = Alternate
- ITF = ITF entry
- PR = Protected ranking
- SR = Special ranking
- SE = Special exempt
- JE = Junior exempt
- JR = Junior Accelerator Programme entrant
- CO = College Accelerator Programme entrant
- NG = Next Gen Accelerator Program entrant
- w/o = Walkover
- r = Retired
- d = Defaulted

=== Finals ===
Quarterfinals
(United Kingdom) Mark Cox (United Kingdom) Alan Mills	6	4	6	6	6
(South Africa) Cliff Drysdale (Australia) Martin Mulligan	8	6	2	2	3
4	(Australia) Bill Bowrey (Australia) Owen Davidson	9	8	13	4	6
(Netherlands) Tom Okker (Australia) Ray Ruffels	7	10	11	6	4
(Denmark) Jan Leschly (Denmark) Jørgen Ulrich	1	2	2
3	(United States) Clark Graebner (United States) Marty Riessen	6	6	6
(India) Premjit Lall (India) Jaidip Mukerjea	8	0	6	2
(Australia) Ken Fletcher (Australia) John Newcombe	10	6	4	6

Semifinals
(United Kingdom) Mark Cox (United Kingdom) Alan Mills	2	4	7
4	(Australia) Bill Bowrey (Australia) Owen Davidson	6	6	9
3	(United States) Clark Graebner (United States) Marty Riessen	3	5	1
(Australia) Ken Fletcher (Australia) John Newcombe	6	7	6

Final
4	(Australia) Bill Bowrey (Australia) Owen Davidson	3	4	6	3
(Australia) Ken Fletcher (Australia) John Newcombe	6	6	3	6

=== Top half ===
==== Section 1 ====
First round
1	(Australia) Roy Emerson (Australia) Fred Stolle	7	12	6
(Australia) Bob Carmichael (Australia) Bob Howe	5	10	2
(India) Naresh Kumar (India) Shiv Prakash Misra	6	9	3	6
(United States) John Pickens (United States) Bill Tym	2	7	6	3
(United Kingdom) Mark Cox (United Kingdom) Alan Mills	6	6	6
(France) Bernard Montrenaud (France) Bernard Paul	3	4	3
(United Kingdom) Mike Sangster (United Kingdom) Bobby Wilson	10	8	6
(Belgium) Eric Drossart (Belgium) Claude De Gronckel	8	6	1
(Brazil) Ronnie Barnes (United States) Ronnie Holmberg	3	6	7	8	6
(United States) Jerry Cromwell (United States) Jim Osborne	6	2	9	6	3
(Soviet Union) Sergei Likhachev (Soviet Union) Alex Metreveli	6	6	7
Q	(South Africa) Terry Ryan (South Africa) Rohan Summers	4	4	5
(United Kingdom) Gerald Battrick (United Kingdom) David Lloyd	4	8	4	2
(United Kingdom) Graham Stilwell (United Kingdom) Keith Wooldridge	6	6	6	6
(France) Jean-Pierre Courcol (France) Michel Leclercq	6	4	1	4
(South Africa) Cliff Drysdale (Australia) Martin Mulligan	4	6	6	6

Second round
1	(Australia) R Emerson (Australia) F Stolle	6	6	6
(India) N Kumar (India) SP Misra	3	1	1
(United Kingdom) M Cox (United Kingdom) A Mills	10	6	1	6
(United Kingdom) M Sangster (United Kingdom) R Wilson	8	4	6	3
(Brazil) R Barnes (United States) R Holmberg	6	7	2	12	6
(Soviet Union) S Likhachev (Soviet Union) A Metreveli	1	9	6	10	3
(United Kingdom) G Stilwell (United Kingdom) K Wooldridge	8	2	4
(South Africa) C Drysdale (Australia) M Mulligan	10	6	6

Third round
(Australia) R Emerson (Australia) F Stolle	w/o
(United Kingdom) M Cox (United Kingdom) A Mills
(Brazil) R Barnes (United States) R Holmberg	4	4	6	2
(South Africa) C Drysdale (Australia) M Mulligan	6	6	4	6

Quarterfinals
(United Kingdom) M Cox (United Kingdom) A Mills	6	4	6	6	6
(South Africa) C Drysdale (Australia) M Mulligan	8	6	2	2	3

==== Section 2 ====
First round
4	(Australia) Bill Bowrey (Australia) Owen Davidson	2	3	11	6	7
(West Germany) Ingo Buding (West Germany) Wilhelm Bungert	6	6	9	4	5
(Japan) Osamu Ishiguro (Japan) Koji Watanabe	4	8	4	1
(South Africa) Bob Maud (South Africa) Ray Moore	6	6	6	6
(Jamaica) Lance Lumsden (Jamaica) Richard Russell	2	6	5	3
(Australia) Bob Hewitt (South Africa) Abe Segal	6	4	7	6
(United States) Gardnar Mulloy (Australia) Barry Phillips-Moore	w/o
(United Kingdom) Geoffrey Bluett (United Kingdom) John Crump
(United States) Charlie Pasarell (United States) Dennis Ralston	6	6	7
(France) Patrice Beust (France) Daniel Contet	0	1	5
(United Kingdom) Billy Knight (United Kingdom) Tony Pickard	4	2	4
(Netherlands) Tom Okker (Australia) Ray Ruffels	6	6	6
(United States) Donald Dell (United States) Jim McManus	4	3	6
(Brazil) Thomaz Koch (Brazil) José Edison Mandarino	6	6	8
(New Zealand) Lew Gerrard (United Kingdom) Roger Taylor	6	4	3	7	4
(Romania) Ilie Năstase (Romania) Ion Țiriac	3	6	6	5	6

Second round
4	(Australia) W Bowrey (Australia) O Davidson	6	7	6
(South Africa) R Maud (South Africa) R Moore	3	5	2
(Australia) R Hewitt (South Africa) A Segal	7	6	6
(United Kingdom) G Bluett (United Kingdom) J Crump	5	4	2
(United States) C Pasarell (United States) D Ralston	6	6	1	4	5
(Netherlands) T Okker (Australia) R Ruffels	3	4	6	6	7
(Brazil) T Koch (Brazil) JE Mandarino	4	6	6	6
(Romania) I Năstase (Romania) I Țiriac	6	2	4	3

Third round
4	(Australia) W Bowrey (Australia) O Davidson	6	3	6	6
(Australia) R Hewitt (South Africa) A Segal	4	6	3	0
(Netherlands) T Okker (Australia) R Ruffels	16	7	9	6
(Brazil) T Koch (Brazil) JE Mandarino	14	5	11	2

Quarterfinals
4	(Australia) W Bowrey (Australia) O Davidson	9	8	13	4	6
(Netherlands) T Okker (Australia) R Ruffels	7	10	11	6	4

=== Bottom half ===
==== Section 3 ====
First round
(United States) Bill Hoogs (South Africa) Jack Saul	6	3	9	6
(Australia) Jimmy Moore (South Africa) Colin Zeeman	4	6	7	2
(Ecuador) Pancho Guzmán (Ecuador) Miguel Olvera	6	6	6
Q	(Socialist Federal Republic of Yugoslavia) Željko Franulović (Socialist Federal Republic of Yugoslavia) Zdravko Minček	4	0	1
(Denmark) Jan Leschly (Denmark) Jørgen Ulrich	11	7	7
(Australia) John Cottrill (Australia) Allan Stone	9	5	5
(Japan) Ichizo Konishi (Japan) Isao Watanabe	6	8	2	7
(Colombia) William Álvarez (Hungary) István Gulyás	3	6	6	5
(France) Pierre Darmon (France) Georges Goven	4	6	2	8
(South Africa) Keith Diepraam (South Africa) Frew McMillan	6	3	6	10
(United States) Bob Lutz (United States) Stan Smith	6	6	6
Q	(United Kingdom) Tim Phillips (South Africa) Ray Weedon	4	3	3
(United Kingdom) John Barrett (United Kingdom) Peter Curtis	6	4	4	5
(Canada) Keith Carpenter (Canada) Harry Fauquier	2	6	6	7
(United Kingdom) John Clifton (United Kingdom) Paul Hutchins	5	2	2
3	(United States) Clark Graebner (United States) Marty Riessen	7	6	6

Second round
(United States) W Hoogs (South Africa) J Saul	3	9	8	6
(Ecuador) F Guzmán (Ecuador) M Olvera	6	7	6	3
(Denmark) J Leschly (Denmark) J Ulrich	6	7	6
(Japan) I Konishi (Japan) I Watanabe	2	5	3
(South Africa) K Diepraam (South Africa) F McMillan	6	4	6	11	6
(United States) R Lutz (United States) S Smith	4	6	4	13	8
(Canada) K Carpenter (Canada) H Fauquier	2	1	1
3	(United States) C Graebner (United States) M Riessen	6	6	6

Third round
(United States) W Hoogs (South Africa) J Saul	2	9	9	2	4
(Denmark) J Leschly (Denmark) J Ulrich	6	7	7	6	6
(United States) R Lutz (United States) S Smith	6	5	3	7
3	(United States) C Graebner (United States) M Riessen	4	7	6	9

Quarterfinals
(Denmark) J Leschly (Denmark) J Ulrich	1	2	2
3	(United States) C Graebner (United States) M Riessen	6	6	6

==== Section 4 ====
First round
(Rhodesia) Frank Salomon (South Africa) Peter van Lingen	6	6	6	3	5
(Czechoslovakia) Jiří Javorský (Czechoslovakia) Jan Kodeš	8	3	3	6	7
Q	(United Kingdom) Ted Beards (United Kingdom) Roy Dixon	10	3	2	5
(France) Jean-Claude Barclay (Italy) Nicola Pietrangeli	8	6	6	7
(Chile) Patricio Rodríguez (Argentina) Eduardo Soriano	3	4	4
(India) Premjit Lall (India) Jaidip Mukerjea	6	6	6
Q	(United Kingdom) Geoff Ward (United Kingdom) Ivor Warwick	8	6	2	6
(Sweden) Ove Bengtson (Sweden) Bo Holmström	10	1	6	8
(Socialist Federal Republic of Yugoslavia) Nikola Pilić (United States) Gene Scott	19	12	6	4	9
(United States) Cliff Richey (Denmark) Torben Ulrich	21	10	4	6	7
(Italy) Giordano Maioli (Italy) Sergio Tacchini	6	1	2	2
(Spain) José Luis Arilla (Spain) Manuel Santana	3	6	6	6
(Chile) Ernesto Aguirre (Chile) Jaime Pinto Bravo	10	7	2	13
(United Kingdom) Michael Hann (New Zealand) John McDonald	12	5	6	15
(United Kingdom) Clay Iles (United Kingdom) Stanley Matthews	6	6	2	7	3
(Australia) Ken Fletcher (Australia) John Newcombe	4	3	6	9	6

Second round
(Czechoslovakia) J Javorský (Czechoslovakia) J Kodeš	4	2	4
(France) J-C Barclay (Italy) N Pietrangeli	6	6	6
(India) P Lall (India) J Mukerjea	9	6	3	6
(Sweden) O Bengtson (Sweden) B Holmström	7	1	6	3
(Socialist Federal Republic of Yugoslavia) N Pilić (United States) E Scott	2	16	6	2	4
(Spain) JL Arilla (Spain) M Santana	6	14	2	6	6
(United Kingdom) M Hann (New Zealand) J McDonald	5	4	5
(Australia) K Fletcher (Australia) J Newcombe	7	6	7

Third round
(France) J-C Barclay (Italy) N Pietrangeli	7	3	3	2
(India) P Lall (India) J Mukerjea	5	6	6	6
(Spain) JL Arilla (Spain) M Santana	6	5	7	4
(Australia) K Fletcher (Australia) J Newcombe	2	7	9	6

Quarterfinals
(India) P Lall (India) J Mukerjea	8	0	6	2
(Australia) K Fletcher (Australia) J Newcombe	10	6	4	6
