= 1965 Wimbledon Championships – Men's doubles =

Men's doubles
- 1965 Wimbledon Championships

Final
- Champions: (Australia) John Newcombe (Australia) Tony Roche
- Runners-up: (Australia) Ken Fletcher (Australia) Bob Hewitt
- Score: 7–5, 6–3, 6–4

Details
- Draw: 64 (5 Q )
- Seeds: 4

Events
Singles	men	women		boys	girls
Doubles	men	women	mixed	boys	girls
← 1964 ·	Wimbledon Championships	· 1966 →

Bob Hewitt and Fred Stolle were the defending champions, but decided not to play together. Stolle partnered with Roy Emerson but lost in the third round to Rafael Osuna and Antonio Palafox.

John Newcombe and Tony Roche defeated Hewitt and his partner Ken Fletcher in the final, 7–5, 6–3, 6–4 to win the gentlemen's doubles tennis title at the 1964 Wimbledon Championship.

== Seeds ==
1. (Australia) Roy Emerson / (Australia) Fred Stolle (third round)
2. (Australia) John Newcombe / (Australia) Tony Roche (champions)
3. (United States) Dennis Ralston / (United States) Ham Richardson (semifinals)
4. (Australia) Ken Fletcher / (Australia) Bob Hewitt (final)

Click on the seed number of a player to go to their draw section.

== Draw ==
=== Key ===
- Q = Qualifier
- WC = Wild card
- LL = Lucky loser
- Alt = Alternate
- ITF = ITF entry
- PR = Protected ranking
- SR = Special ranking
- SE = Special exempt
- JE = Junior exempt
- JR = Junior Accelerator Programme entrant
- CO = College Accelerator Programme entrant
- NG = Next Gen Accelerator Program entrant
- w/o = Walkover
- r = Retired
- d = Defaulted

=== Finals ===
Quarterfinals
(Mexico) Rafael Osuna (Mexico) Antonio Palafox	0	1	6	6	0
(United States) Clark Graebner (United States) Marty Riessen	6	6	3	4	6
4	(Australia) Ken Fletcher (Australia) Bob Hewitt	6	6	6
(France) Patrice Beust (France) Daniel Contet	2	4	2
(Australia) Bob Howe (India) Ramanathan Krishnan	7	7	5	7	4
3	(United States) Dennis Ralston (United States) Ham Richardson	9	5	7	5	6
(South Africa) Keith Diepraam (South Africa) Cliff Drysdale	3	6	8	5	4
2	(Australia) John Newcombe (Australia) Tony Roche	6	2	6	7	6

Semifinals
(United States) Clark Graebner (United States) Marty Riessen	5	4	4
4	(Australia) Ken Fletcher (Australia) Bob Hewitt	7	6	6
3	(United States) Dennis Ralston (United States) Ham Richardson	7	12	4	6	2
2	(Australia) John Newcombe (Australia) Tony Roche	5	14	6	1	6

Final
4	(Australia) Ken Fletcher (Australia) Bob Hewitt	5	3	4
2	(Australia) John Newcombe (Australia) Tony Roche	7	6	6

=== Top half ===
==== Section 1 ====
First round
1	(Australia) Roy Emerson (Australia) Fred Stolle	6	6	6
Q	(United States) Stan Smith (United States) Steve Tidball	3	0	1
(Australia) Martin Mulligan (United Kingdom) Roger Taylor	w/o
(United Kingdom) Mark Cox (New Zealand) John McDonald
(Philippines) Guillermo Hernandez (United States) Bill Lenoir	3	2	0
(Australia) Bill Bowrey (Australia) Owen Davidson	6	6	6
(Mexico) Rafael Osuna (Mexico) Antonio Palafox	6	6	6	13
(West Germany) Ingo Buding (West Germany) Harald Elschenbroich	2	8	4	11
(United Kingdom) Geoffrey Bluett (United Kingdom) John Crump	6	6	6
(New Zealand) Ian Crookenden (New Zealand) Lew Gerrard	2	4	2
Q	(Australia) Brenton Higgins (South Africa) Jack Saul	6	3	2	4
(United Kingdom) Graham Stilwell (United Kingdom) Keith Wooldridge	2	6	6	6
(United Kingdom) Geoff Ward (United Kingdom) Ivor Warwick	2	3	5
(United Kingdom) Billy Knight (United Kingdom) Tony Pickard	6	6	7
(United States) Clark Graebner (United States) Marty Riessen	4	17	6	9
(South Africa) Terry Ryan (South Africa) Abe Segal	6	15	1	7

Second round
1	(Australia) R Emerson (Australia) F Stolle	6	6	6
(United Kingdom) M Cox (New Zealand) J McDonald	4	2	2
(Australia) W Bowrey (Australia) O Davidson	2	7	6	4
(Mexico) R Osuna (Mexico) A Palafox	6	9	3	6
(United Kingdom) G Bluett (United Kingdom) J Crump	6	6	8	6
(United Kingdom) G Stilwell (United Kingdom) K Wooldridge	8	3	6	4
(United Kingdom) W Knight (United Kingdom) A Pickard	6	0	8
(United States) C Graebner (United States) M Riessen	8	6	10

Third round
1	(Australia) R Emerson (Australia) F Stolle	12	4	2	10	5
(Mexico) R Osuna (Mexico) A Palafox	10	6	6	8	7
(United Kingdom) G Bluett (United Kingdom) J Crump	1	7	2	4
(United States) C Graebner (United States) M Riessen	6	5	6	6

Quarterfinals
(Mexico) R Osuna (Mexico) A Palafox	0	1	6	6	0
(United States) C Graebner (United States) M Riessen	6	6	3	4	6

==== Section 2 ====
First round
4	(Australia) Ken Fletcher (Australia) Bob Hewitt	3	6	6	7
(United States) Arthur Ashe (United States) Tom Edlefsen	6	3	3	5
(Sweden) Bo Holmström (Sweden) Jan-Erik Lundqvist	6	4	3	4
(South Africa) Bob Maud (South Africa) Ray Moore	4	6	6	6
(United Kingdom) Peter Moys (United Kingdom) John Ward	2	6	3	6	5
(Australia) John Cooper (Australia) Ray Ruffels	6	2	6	3	7
(United States) Keith Jennings (United States) Chauncey Steele	2	6	9	9	4
(United States) Frank Froehling (United States) Charlie Pasarell	6	0	11	7	6
(Australia) Ray Keldie (Australia) Doug Kelso	7	6	6
(Japan) Osamu Ishiguro (Japan) Koji Watanabe	5	3	1
(Australia) Allan Stone (Australia) Colin Stubs	3	2	6	2
(France) Patrice Beust (France) Daniel Contet	6	6	3	6
(Australia) Bob Carmichael (South Africa) Frew McMillan	6	9	3	4	6
(South Africa) Clive Brebnor (South Africa) David Phillips	2	7	6	6	4
(France) Pierre Barthès (France) François Jauffret	3	2	4
(Australia) Neale Fraser (Italy) Nicola Pietrangeli	6	6	6

Second round
4	(Australia) K Fletcher (Australia) R Hewitt	6	6	6
(South Africa) R Maud (South Africa) R Moore	3	3	1
(Australia) J Cooper (Australia) R Ruffels	6	6	7
(United States) F Froehling (United States) C Pasarell	4	1	5
(Australia) R Keldie (Australia) D Kelso	6	3	2	6
(France) P Beust (France) D Contet	2	6	6	8
(Australia) R Carmichael (South Africa) F McMillan	6	6	3	6	6
(Australia) N Fraser (Italy) N Pietrangeli	2	8	6	3	4

Third round
4	(Australia) K Fletcher (Australia) R Hewitt	6	9	6
(Australia) J Cooper (Australia) R Ruffels	3	7	4
(France) P Beust (France) D Contet	6	6	6
(Australia) R Carmichael (South Africa) F McMillan	3	3	1

Quarterfinals
4	(Australia) K Fletcher (Australia) R Hewitt	6	6	6
(France) P Beust (France) D Contet	2	4	2

=== Bottom half ===
==== Section 3 ====
First round
(India) Premjit Lall (India) Jaidip Mukerjea	4	6	1	4
(Australia) Bob Howe (India) Ramanathan Krishnan	6	4	6	6
(United Kingdom) Clay Iles (United Kingdom) Stanley Matthews	13	5	4	8
Q	(Chile) Jaime Pinto Bravo (Mexico) Vicente Zarazúa	11	7	6	10
(United Kingdom) Reg Bennett (United Kingdom) Michael Hann	4	6	6	3
(United Kingdom) John Barrett (United Kingdom) Gerald Battrick	6	1	8	6
(United States) Jim McManus (United States) Cliff Richey	5	6	4	10	1
(Soviet Union) Toomas Leius (Soviet Union) Alex Metreveli	7	3	6	8	6
(United States) Bill Hoogs (Netherlands) Tom Okker
(Spain) Juan Manuel Couder (Spain) Juan Gisbert	w/o
(Colombia) William Álvarez (Spain) José Luis Arilla	6	6	6
(West Germany) Adolf Kreinberg (Switzerland) Dimitri Sturdza	4	4	2
(United States) Tom Brown (United States) Gene Scott	4	6	3	6	9
(United Kingdom) Mike Sangster (United Kingdom) Bobby Wilson	6	3	6	3	11
(United States) Jim Parker (United States) Chuck Rombeau	3	2	2
3	(United States) Dennis Ralston (United States) Ham Richardson	6	6	6

Second round
(Australia) R Howe (India) R Krishnan	6	6	6
Q	(Chile) J Pinto Bravo (Mexico) V Zarazúa	2	2	2
(United Kingdom) J Barrett (United Kingdom) G Battrick	0	8	2
(Soviet Union) T Leius (Soviet Union) A Metreveli	6	10	6
(United States) W Hoogs (Netherlands) T Okker	4	9	6	4
(Colombia) W Álvarez (Spain) JL Arilla	6	11	4	6
(United Kingdom) M Sangster (United Kingdom) R Wilson	3	4	4
3	(United States) D Ralston (United States) H Richardson	6	6	6

Third round
(Australia) R Howe (India) R Krishnan	4	8	6	9
(Soviet Union) T Leius (Soviet Union) A Metreveli	6	6	2	7
(Colombia) W Álvarez (Spain) JL Arilla	3	1	6
3	(United States) D Ralston (United States) H Richardson	6	6	8

Quarterfinals
(Australia) R Howe (India) R Krishnan	7	7	5	7	4
3	(United States) D Ralston (United States) H Richardson	9	5	7	5	6

==== Section 4 ====
First round
Q	(Australia) Gary Baulch (Australia) Jimmy Moore	6	7	1	8
Q	(United Kingdom) Ted Beards (United Kingdom) Roy Dixon	4	5	6	6
(Denmark) Torben Ulrich (France) Gil de Kermadec	3	3	0
(Brazil) Ronnie Barnes (Brazil) Thomaz Koch	6	6	6
(France) Jean-Claude Barclay (France) Pierre Darmon	0	4	6	9	3
(South Africa) Keith Diepraam (South Africa) Cliff Drysdale	6	6	4	7	6
(India) Shiv Prakash Misra (Jamaica) Richard Russell	6	5	6	6
(Australia) John Sharpe (United States) Roger Werksman	3	7	4	2
(United States) Herb Fitzgibbon (United States) Richard Williams	6	3	6	6
(South Africa) Robin Sanders (South Africa) Colin Zeeman	1	6	1	2
(West Germany) Wilhelm Bungert (West Germany) Christian Kuhnke	7	4	15	6
(United Kingdom) Alan Mills (United States) Gardnar Mulloy	5	6	13	2
(United States) Donald Dell (United States) Allen Fox	3	6	6	2	4
(Czechoslovakia) Milan Holeček (Czechoslovakia) Jiří Javorský	6	4	3	6	6
(Venezuela) Isaías Pimentel (Chile) Patricio Rodríguez	3	4	2
2	(Australia) John Newcombe (Australia) Tony Roche	6	6	6

Second round
Q	(Australia) G Baulch (Australia) J Moore	5	4	4
(Brazil) R Barnes (Brazil) T Koch	7	6	6
(South Africa) K Diepraam (South Africa) C Drysdale	6	8	9
(India) SP Misra (Jamaica) R Russell	4	6	7
(United States) H Fitzgibbon (United States) R Williams	3	5	4
(West Germany) W Bungert (West Germany) C Kuhnke	6	7	6
(Czechoslovakia) M Holeček (Czechoslovakia) J Javorský	5	0	2
2	(Australia) J Newcombe (Australia) A Roche	7	6	6

Third round
(Brazil) R Barnes (Brazil) T Koch	6	3	10	4	4
(South Africa) K Diepraam (South Africa) C Drysdale	4	6	8	6	6
(West Germany) W Bungert (West Germany) C Kuhnke	4	5	11
2	(Australia) J Newcombe (Australia) A Roche	6	7	13

Quarterfinals
(South Africa) K Diepraam (South Africa) C Drysdale	3	6	8	5	4
2	(Australia) J Newcombe (Australia) A Roche	6	2	6	7	6
