= 1965 Wimbledon Championships – Men's singles =

Men's singles
- 1965 Wimbledon Championships

Final
- Champion: (Australia) Roy Emerson
- Runner-up: (Australia) Fred Stolle
- Score: 6–2, 6–4, 6–4

Details
- Draw: 128 (10 Q )
- Seeds: 8

Events
Singles	men	women		boys	girls
Doubles	men	women	mixed	boys	girls
← 1964 ·	Wimbledon Championships	· 1966 →

Roy Emerson successfully defended his title, defeating Fred Stolle 6–2, 6–4, 6–4 in the final to win the gentlemen's singles tennis title at the 1965 Wimbledon Championships.

== Seeds ==
1. (Australia) Roy Emerson (champion)
2. (Australia) Fred Stolle (final)
3. (Sweden) Jan-Erik Lundqvist (second round)
4. (United States) Dennis Ralston (semifinals)
5. (West Germany) Wilhelm Bungert (third round)
6. (Australia) John Newcombe (fourth round)
7. (Australia) Tony Roche (second round)
8. (Mexico) Rafael Osuna (quarterfinals)

Click on the seed number of a player to go to their draw section.

== Draw ==
=== Key ===
- Q = Qualifier
- WC = Wild card
- LL = Lucky loser
- Alt = Alternate
- ITF = ITF entry
- PR = Protected ranking
- SR = Special ranking
- SE = Special exempt
- JE = Junior exempt
- JR = Junior Accelerator Programme entrant
- CO = College Accelerator Programme entrant
- NG = Next Gen Accelerator Program entrant
- w/o = Walkover
- r = Retired
- d = Defaulted

=== Finals ===
Quarterfinals
1	(Australia) Roy Emerson	4	6	6	6
(South Africa) Keith Diepraam	6	3	1	1
4	(United States) Dennis Ralston	3	2	6	6	6
(United States) Marty Riessen	6	6	4	2	2
(South Africa) Cliff Drysdale	4	6	7	7
(United States) Allen Fox	6	2	5	5
8	(Mexico) Rafael Osuna	13	3	1	2
2	(Australia) Fred Stolle	11	6	6	6

Semifinals
1	(Australia) Roy Emerson	6	6	7	6
4	(United States) Dennis Ralston	1	2	9	1
(South Africa) Cliff Drysdale	3	4	5
2	(Australia) Fred Stolle	6	6	7

Final
1	(Australia) Roy Emerson	6	6	6
2	(Australia) Fred Stolle	2	4	4

=== Top half ===
==== Section 1 ====
First round
1	(Australia) Roy Emerson	6	6	6
(Venezuela) Isaías Pimentel	3	2	2
(United Kingdom) Mike Sangster	6	6	18
(United States) Frank Froehling	4	2	16
(Australia) John Cooper	3	4	9	6	6
(United Kingdom) Tony Pickard	6	6	7	2	2
(Poland) Wiesław Gąsiorek	2	8	4	7	5
(South Africa) Robin Sanders	6	6	6	5	7
(United States) Gardnar Mulloy
(Spain) Juan Manuel Couder	w/o
(India) Premjit Lall	6	6	4	7
(Italy) Giuseppe Merlo	0	2	6	5
(United Kingdom) Alan Mills	3	6	10	6
(Australia) John Sharpe	6	3	8	3
(United States) Roger Werksman	4	3	6	2
(Australia) Ken Fletcher	6	6	2	6

Second round
1	(Australia) R Emerson	8	6	6
(United Kingdom) M Sangster	6	3	2
(Australia) J Cooper	9	6	6
(South Africa) R Sanders	7	1	4
(United States) G Mulloy	6	4	2
(India) P Lall	8	6	6
(United Kingdom) A Mills	1	0	6	1
(Australia) K Fletcher	6	6	3	6

Third round
1	(Australia) R Emerson	6	6	6
(Australia) J Cooper	3	4	4
(India) P Lall	3	2	1
(Australia) K Fletcher	6	6	6

Fourth round
1	(Australia) R Emerson	10	6	3	11
(Australia) K Fletcher	8	4	6	9

==== Section 2 ====
First round
7	(Australia) Tony Roche	6	12	6
(Australia) Ray Ruffels	2	10	4
(Australia) Martin Mulligan	6	6	7
(West Germany) Harald Elschenbroich	3	2	5
Q	(United Kingdom) Ted Beards	4	1	5
(New Zealand) Ian Crookenden	6	6	7
(France) Christian Duxin	3	0	3
(United States) Jim McManus	6	6	6
(Poland) Andrzej Licis	4	3	3
(Brazil) Ronnie Barnes	6	6	6
(France) François Jauffret	7	6	6
(Ecuador) Pancho Guzmán	5	2	0
Q	(Australia) Colin Stubs	6	2	4	6	6
(United States) Bill Lenoir	4	6	6	4	3
(Japan) Koji Watanabe	7	2	3
(South Africa) Keith Diepraam	9	6	6

Second round
7	(Australia) A Roche	4	2	8	5
(Australia) M Mulligan	6	6	6	7
(New Zealand) I Crookenden	2	3	6	4
(United States) J McManus	6	6	1	6
(Brazil) R Barnes	5	4	4
(France) F Jauffret	7	6	6
Q	(Australia) C Stubs	6	3	3	3
(South Africa) K Diepraam	3	6	6	6

Third round
(Australia) M Mulligan	4	2	2
(United States) J McManus	6	6	6
(France) F Jauffret	0	2	2
(South Africa) K Diepraam	6	6	6

Fourth round
(United States) J McManus	7	4	4	2
(South Africa) K Diepraam	5	6	6	6

==== Section 3 ====
First round
4	(United States) Dennis Ralston	15	9	6
(United States) Ham Richardson	13	7	2
(France) Michel Leclercq	6	9	6
(Czechoslovakia) Milan Holeček	4	7	4
(India) Ramanathan Krishnan	6	6	2	6
(New Zealand) Lew Gerrard	2	3	6	2
(United States) Clark Graebner	7	6	6
(United Kingdom) Mark Cox	5	2	2
(Soviet Union) Alex Metreveli	6	6	11	6
Q	(Jamaica) Richard Russell	3	8	9	2
(France) Daniel Contet	10	9	6
(South Africa) Bob Maud	8	7	3
(Australia) Bill Bowrey	1	6	6	2
(Brazil) Thomaz Koch	6	8	3	6
(France) Pierre Barthès	10	14	9	6
(Netherlands) Tom Okker	12	12	7	3

Second round
4	(United States) D Ralston	6	6	6
(France) M Leclercq	3	2	2
(India) R Krishnan	7	1	6	6
(United States) C Graebner	5	6	4	2
(Soviet Union) A Metreveli	6	8	10
(France) D Contet	3	6	8
(Brazil) T Koch	3	6	6	7
(France) P Barthès	6	2	3	5

Third round
4	(United States) D Ralston	9	6	6
(India) R Krishnan	7	1	4
(Soviet Union) A Metreveli	5	6	17	3	6
(Brazil) T Koch	7	3	15	6	8

Fourth round
4	(United States) D Ralston	6	6	6
(Brazil) T Koch	3	3	1

==== Section 4 ====
First round
5	(West Germany) Wilhelm Bungert	4	6	6	1	6
(Mexico) Antonio Palafox	6	3	2	6	3
(United Kingdom) Bobby Wilson	6	8	7
(United States) Charlie Pasarell	2	6	5
(Italy) Sergio Tacchini	6	3	6	6
(South Africa) Colin Zeeman	1	6	3	2
(United States) Marty Riessen	6	6	3	6
(Greece) Nicholas Kalogeropoulos	4	4	6	3
LL	(Sweden) Bo Holmström	3	6	4
(Australia) Bob Howe	6	8	6
Q	(United Kingdom) Geoffrey Bluett	6	3	6	6
(West Germany) Adolf Kreinberg	4	6	4	3
(Spain) Juan Gisbert	3	4	5
(United Kingdom) John Barrett	6	6	7
(United States) Herb Fitzgibbon	9	6	6
(South Africa) Clive Brebnor	7	2	3

Second round
5	(West Germany) W Bungert	6	6	2	5	6
(United Kingdom) R Wilson	4	3	6	7	2
(Italy) S Tacchini	3	4	3
(United States) M Riessen	6	6	6
(Australia) R Howe	6	6	8
Q	(United Kingdom) G Bluett	2	1	6
(United Kingdom) J Barrett	6	5	3	2
(United States) H Fitzgibbon	4	7	6	6

Third round
5	(West Germany) W Bungert	2	5	6
(United States) M Riessen	6	7	8
(Australia) R Howe	6	6	6
(United States) H Fitzgibbon	3	2	4

Fourth round
(United States) M Riessen	6	6	6
(Australia) R Howe	2	2	1

=== Bottom half ===
==== Section 5 ====
First round
(South Africa) Cliff Drysdale	6	6	6
Q	(Mexico) Vicente Zarazúa	1	3	0
(Japan) Osamu Ishiguro	3	4	2
(India) Jaidip Mukerjea	6	6	6
(United Kingdom) Michael Hann	6	6	6	6	8
Q	(Australia) Jimmy Moore	8	0	2	8	6
(West Germany) Christian Kuhnke	12	6	6
(Brazil) José Edison Mandarino	10	4	3
(United States) Cliff Richey	6	6	7
(Colombia) William Álvarez	2	3	5
(Chile) Patricio Rodríguez	4	5	6	10
(France) Jean-Claude Barclay	6	7	3	12
(United Kingdom) Gerald Battrick	4	3	2
(United States) Tom Brown	6	6	6
(Argentina) Eduardo Soriano	2	1	6
6	(Australia) John Newcombe	6	6	8

Second round
(South Africa) C Drysdale	6	6	8
(India) J Mukerjea	2	3	6
(United Kingdom) M Hann	5	2	3
(West Germany) C Kuhnke	7	6	6
(United States) C Richey	4	3	6	6	7
(France) J-C Barclay	6	6	1	0	5
(United States) T Brown	4	2	5
6	(Australia) J Newcombe	6	6	7

Third round
(South Africa) C Drysdale	7	6	3	6
(West Germany) C Kuhnke	5	2	6	1
(United States) C Richey	4	2	2
6	(Australia) J Newcombe	6	6	6

Fourth round
(South Africa) C Drysdale	9	6	11	11
6	(Australia) J Newcombe	7	4	13	9

==== Section 6 ====
First round
(Rhodesia) Roger Dowdeswell	6	6	7
LL	(Thailand) Felix Bautista	3	2	5
(South Africa) Terry Ryan	5	4	5
(Italy) Nicola Pietrangeli	7	6	7
(United Kingdom) Roger Taylor	6	6	6
(Ecuador) Eduardo Zuleta	1	0	0
(United States) Donald Dell	5	11	6	6	6
(United States) Bill Hoogs	7	13	1	2	4
(South Africa) Frew McMillan	1	6	3	4
(Soviet Union) Toomas Leius	6	3	6	6
(United States) Gene Scott	6	6	7
(United Kingdom) Stanley Matthews	4	2	5
(United States) Allen Fox	5	6	6	6
(United States) Tom Edlefsen	7	0	2	4
(New Zealand) John McDonald	2	4	0
3	(Sweden) Jan-Erik Lundqvist	6	6	6

Second round
(Rhodesia) R Dowdeswell	3	4	5
(Italy) N Pietrangeli	6	6	7
(United Kingdom) R Taylor	6	7	6
(United States) D Dell	2	5	4
(Soviet Union) T Leius	2	7	9	6	4
(United States) E Scott	6	9	7	4	6
(United States) A Fox	7	7	6	7
3	(Sweden) J-E Lundqvist	9	5	2	5

Third round
(Italy) N Pietrangeli	7	2	4	6	6
(United Kingdom) R Taylor	5	6	6	2	3
(United States) E Scott	4	5	2
(United States) A Fox	6	7	6

Fourth round
(Italy) N Pietrangeli	7	5	2	4
(United States) A Fox	5	7	6	6

==== Section 7 ====
First round
(Australia) Doug Kelso	6	2	3	3
(United States) Arthur Ashe	3	6	6	6
(France) Pierre Darmon	6	6	3	6
Q	(United Kingdom) Charlie Applewhaite	2	2	6	4
(India) Shiv Prakash Misra	4	6	6	6	3
(Australia) Bob Carmichael	6	4	8	4	6
(South Africa) Abe Segal	6	7	6
Q	(Chile) Omar Pabst	4	5	3
(Australia) Owen Davidson	8	8	4	4
(West Germany) Ingo Buding	6	10	6	6
Q	(South Africa) Pat Cramer	6	7	3	5
(Canada) Keith Carpenter	8	5	6	7
(Netherlands) Jan Hajer	4	2	6	4
LL	(United States) Stan Smith	6	6	3	6
(Hungary) István Gulyás	2	4	6	6	3
8	(Mexico) Rafael Osuna	6	6	3	2	6

Second round
(United States) A Ashe	6	6	6	6
(France) P Darmon	8	4	4	1
(Australia) R Carmichael	6	6	6
(South Africa) A Segal	1	3	3
(West Germany) I Buding	9	6	6
(Canada) K Carpenter	7	2	4
LL	(United States) S Smith	4	2	5
8	(Mexico) R Osuna	6	6	7

Third round
(United States) A Ashe	7	6	8
(Australia) R Carmichael	5	3	6
(West Germany) I Buding	4	4	5
8	(Mexico) R Osuna	6	6	7

Fourth round
(United States) A Ashe	6	4	4
8	(Mexico) R Osuna	8	6	6

==== Section 8 ====
First round
(South Africa) Ray Moore	6	1	4	8
(Australia) Neale Fraser	2	6	6	10
(Spain) José Luis Arilla	7	0	4
(Denmark) Torben Ulrich	9	6	6
(South Africa) David Phillips	0	7	5
(United Kingdom) Graham Stilwell	6	9	7
(United States) Jim Parker	3	1	0
(Australia) Bob Hewitt	6	6	6
(United Kingdom) Keith Wooldridge	2	1	3
(United Kingdom) Billy Knight	6	6	6
(Japan) Isao Watanabe	6	4	1	1
(Czechoslovakia) Jiří Javorský	2	6	6	6
Q	(Belgium) Claude De Gronckel	6	9	8
(Switzerland) Dimitri Sturdza	2	7	6
(Soviet Union) Vyacheslav Egorov	3	4	5
2	(Australia) Fred Stolle	6	6	7

Second round
(Australia) N Fraser	10	4	2	7	7
(Denmark) T Ulrich	8	6	6	5	5
(United Kingdom) G Stilwell	5	3	5
(Australia) R Hewitt	7	6	7
(United Kingdom) W Knight	6	6	6
(Czechoslovakia) J Javorský	3	2	1
Q	(Belgium) C De Gronckel	3	2	6
2	(Australia) F Stolle	6	6	8

Third round
(Australia) N Fraser	0	6	6
(Australia) R Hewitt	6	8	8
(United Kingdom) W Knight	4	4	8	4
2	(Australia) F Stolle	6	6	6	6

Fourth round
(Australia) R Hewitt	3	4	4
2	(Australia) F Stolle	6	6	6

Preceded by 1965 French Championships	Grand Slams; Men's Singles	Succeeded by 1965 U.S. Championships
