= 1966 Wimbledon Championships – Men's singles =

1966 Wimbledon Championships: Santana defeats Ralston

Men's singles
- 1966 Wimbledon Championships

Final
- Champion: (Spain) Manuel Santana
- Runner-up: (United States) Dennis Ralston
- Score: 6–4, 11–9, 6–4

Details
- Draw: 128 (10 Q )
- Seeds: 8

Events
Singles	men	women		boys	girls
Doubles	men	women	mixed	boys	girls
← 1965 ·	Wimbledon Championships	· 1967 →

Manuel Santana defeated Dennis Ralston in the final, 6–4, 11–9, 6–4 to win the gentlemen's singles tennis title at the 1966 Wimbledon Championships. Roy Emerson was the defending champion, but lost in the quarterfinals to Owen Davidson.

== Seeds ==
1. (Australia) Roy Emerson (quarterfinals)
2. (Australia) Tony Roche (quarterfinals)
3. (Australia) Fred Stolle (second round)
4. (Spain) Manuel Santana (champion)
5. (Australia) John Newcombe (third round)
6. (United States) Dennis Ralston (final)
7. (South Africa) Cliff Drysdale (semifinals)
8. (United States) Clark Graebner (second round)

Click on the seed number of a player to go to their draw section.

== Draw ==
=== Key ===
- Q = Qualifier
- WC = Wild card
- LL = Lucky loser
- Alt = Alternate
- ITF = ITF entry
- PR = Protected ranking
- SR = Special ranking
- SE = Special exempt
- JE = Junior exempt
- JR = Junior Accelerator Programme entrant
- CO = College Accelerator Programme entrant
- NG = Next Gen Accelerator Program entrant
- w/o = Walkover
- r = Retired
- d = Defaulted

=== Finals ===
Quarterfinals
1	(Australia) Roy Emerson	6	3	4	4
(Australia) Owen Davidson	1	6	6	6
4	(Spain) Manuel Santana	6	3	8	4	7
(Australia) Ken Fletcher	2	6	6	6	5
6	(United States) Dennis Ralston	7	6	11
(Australia) Bob Hewitt	5	2	9
7	(South Africa) Cliff Drysdale	9	6	6
2	(Australia) Tony Roche	7	2	2

Semifinals
(Australia) Owen Davidson	2	6	7	6	5
4	(Spain) Manuel Santana	6	4	9	3	7
6	(United States) Dennis Ralston	6	8	3	7	6
7	(South Africa) Cliff Drysdale	8	6	6	5	3

Final
4	(Spain) Manuel Santana	6	11	6
6	(United States) Dennis Ralston	4	9	4

=== Top half ===
==== Section 1 ====
First round
1	(Australia) Roy Emerson	6	6	6
(Canada) Harry Fauquier	0	1	2
(France) Bernard Montrenaud	6	4	6	4
(West Germany) Wilhelm Bungert	1	6	8	6
(Austria) Peter Pokorny	3	1	3
(United States) Charlie Pasarell	6	6	6
(United Kingdom) John Barrett	6	7	6
(Chile) Jaime Pinto Bravo	2	5	1
(Japan) Koji Watanabe	6	4	6	6
(Italy) Sergio Tacchini	1	6	0	1
(South Africa) Bob Maud	0	5	4
(United States) Stan Smith	6	7	6
(Ecuador) Pancho Guzmán	3	1	2
(United States) Bill Hoogs	6	6	6
(United States) Jim McManus	7	2	7
(United Kingdom) Keith Wooldridge	9	6	9

Second round
1	(Australia) R Emerson	6	6	6
(West Germany) W Bungert	2	3	1
(United States) C Pasarell	9	1	8	6	6
(United Kingdom) J Barrett	7	6	10	4	3
(Japan) K Watanabe	6	8	2	2
(United States) S Smith	4	10	6	6
(United States) W Hoogs	7	5	6	6	4
(United Kingdom) K Wooldridge	9	7	4	4	6

Third round
1	(Australia) R Emerson	7	6	7
(United States) C Pasarell	5	2	5
(United States) S Smith	6	6	6
(United Kingdom) K Wooldridge	3	2	3

Fourth round
1	(Australia) R Emerson	6	6	6
(United States) S Smith	2	2	2

==== Section 2 ====
First round
8	(United States) Clark Graebner	6	6	6
(Australia) Martin Mulligan	4	4	3
(Australia) Owen Davidson	6	6	6
(Socialist Federal Republic of Yugoslavia) Nikola Pilić	4	4	4
(France) Patrice Beust	6	5	6	6
(Israel) Eleazar Davidman	2	7	1	3
(Switzerland) Dimitri Sturdza	3	4	6	6	6
Q	(Japan) Keishiro Yanagi	6	6	3	4	2
(Netherlands) Tom Okker	6	6	6
(United Kingdom) Alan Mills	4	1	1
(United Kingdom) Clay Iles	8	6	6
(South Africa) Peter van Lingen	6	2	4
(Finland) Pekka Säilä	2	2	4
(United Kingdom) Mike Sangster	6	6	6
(Colombia) William Álvarez	1	3	2
(Brazil) Ronnie Barnes	6	6	6

Second round
8	(United States) C Graebner	3	6	6	1
(Australia) O Davidson	6	3	8	6
(France) P Beust	6	9	6
(Switzerland) D Sturdza	4	7	4
(Netherlands) T Okker	6	2
(United Kingdom) C Iles	1	0^{r}
(United Kingdom) M Sangster	3	6	4
(Brazil) R Barnes	6	8	6

Third round
(Australia) O Davidson	6	6	6
(France) P Beust	1	2	2
(Netherlands) T Okker	6	6	3	9
(Brazil) R Barnes	0	1	6	7

Fourth round
(Australia) O Davidson	6	2	6	6
(Netherlands) T Okker	1	6	3	3

==== Section 3 ====
First round
4	(Spain) Manuel Santana	5	3
(Japan) Isao Watanabe	7	0^{r}
(Australia) Jimmy Moore	4	1	1
(Canada) Mike Belkin	6	6	6
(United States) Marty Riessen
(Australia) Barry Phillips-Moore	w/o
(New Zealand) Lew Gerrard	7	11	5
(United States) Gene Scott	9	13	7
(France) Daniel Contet	6	6	8
(Hungary) István Gulyás	4	0	6
Q	(Sweden) Ove Bengtson	6	6	1	6
(United States) Jim Osborne	4	1	6	1
(United States) Jerry Cromwell	6	6	6
(Belgium) Claude De Gronckel	4	3	2
(United Kingdom) Bobby Wilson	6	9	6
(Australia) John Cottrill	0	7	3

Second round
4	(Spain) M Santana	6	6	6
(Canada) M Belkin	0	1	2
(United States) M Riessen	6	6	13
(United States) E Scott	3	3	11
(France) D Contet	6	3	4	4
Q	(Sweden) O Bengtson	3	6	6	6
(United States) J Cromwell	1	4	0
(United Kingdom) R Wilson	6	6	6

Third round
4	(Spain) M Santana	6	6	10
(United States) M Riessen	3	2	8
Q	(Sweden) O Bengtson	6	9	4	4
(United Kingdom) R Wilson	4	11	6	6

Fourth round
4	(Spain) M Santana	6	6	1
(United Kingdom) R Wilson	3	2	2^{r}

==== Section 4 ====
First round
5	(Australia) John Newcombe	6	3	4	6	6
(Australia) Ray Ruffels	1	6	6	3	3
(Romania) Ilie Năstase	2	0	0
(Brazil) Thomaz Koch	6	6	6
(Australia) Bob Carmichael	1	3	4
(Australia) Ken Fletcher	6	6	6
(South Africa) Frew McMillan	6	8	3	6
Q	(France) Bernard Paul	2	6	6	2
(Italy) Giordano Maioli	3	4	6	4
(United States) Ronnie Holmberg	6	6	3	6
(Czechoslovakia) Jiří Javorský	1	4	5
(United Kingdom) Gerald Battrick	6	6	7
(Italy) Gaetano Di Maso	7	7	3	4
(Denmark) Torben Ulrich	9	5	6	6
(Soviet Union) Sergei Likhachev	6	5	5	3
(India) Jaidip Mukerjea	2	7	7	6

Second round
5	(Australia) J Newcombe	7	7	6
(Brazil) T Koch	5	5	4
(Australia) K Fletcher	6	6	1	6
(South Africa) F McMillan	4	3	6	3
(United States) R Holmberg	6	6	6
(United Kingdom) G Battrick	1	1	4
(Denmark) T Ulrich	3	4	5
(India) J Mukerjea	6	6	7

Third round
5	(Australia) J Newcombe	10	6	3	4	3
(Australia) K Fletcher	8	4	6	6	6
(United States) R Holmberg	8	2	6	5
(India) J Mukerjea	6	6	8	7

Fourth round
(Australia) K Fletcher	2	10	9	3	6
(India) J Mukerjea	6	8	7	6	1

=== Bottom half ===
==== Section 5 ====
First round
(Ecuador) Eduardo Zuleta	8	7	3	9
Q	(Australia) Graham Primrose	6	5	6	7
(France) Pierre Darmon	7	6	6
(United States) Donald Dell	5	3	0
(South Africa) Jack Saul	6	6	3	4	12
(Japan) Osamu Ishiguro	1	4	6	6	10
(United Kingdom) Stanley Matthews	2	8	4	5
(United Arab Republic) Ismail El Shafei	6	6	6	7
(South Africa) Keith Diepraam	6	6	6	6
(France) Michel Leclercq	8	2	2	2
(United States) Gardnar Mulloy	3	7	7
(Canada) Keith Carpenter	6	9	9
(United Kingdom) Roger Taylor	3	6	0	2
(Soviet Union) Alex Metreveli	6	0	6	6
(United States) Bob Lutz	5	2	6	4
6	(United States) Dennis Ralston	7	6	3	6

Second round
(Ecuador) E Zuleta	2	0	1
(France) P Darmon	6	6	6
(South Africa) J Saul	6	6	5	5	7
(United Arab Republic) I El Shafei	3	3	7	7	5
(South Africa) K Diepraam	11	10	6	6
(Canada) K Carpenter	13	8	1	0
(Soviet Union) A Metreveli	0	6	4	4
6	(United States) D Ralston	6	4	6	6

Third round
(France) P Darmon	6	6	6
(South Africa) J Saul	1	2	1
(South Africa) K Diepraam	2	6	1	1
6	(United States) D Ralston	6	4	6	6

Fourth round
(France) P Darmon	6	3	4	4
6	(United States) D Ralston	4	6	6	6

==== Section 6 ====
First round
(Denmark) Jørgen Ulrich	6	6	6
(Jamaica) Richard Russell	3	3	2
Q	(France) Jean-Baptiste Chanfreau	5	4	0
(Brazil) José Edison Mandarino	7	6	6
(India) Shiv Prakash Misra	8	3	4	4
(United Kingdom) Mark Cox	6	6	6	6
(Poland) Wiesław Gąsiorek	2	4	4
(Australia) Bill Bowrey	6	6	6
(South Africa) Terry Ryan	6	6	3	6	6
(Italy) Nicola Pietrangeli	2	8	6	3	2
(France) Jean-Claude Barclay	6	4	1	0
LL	(Japan) Ichizo Konishi	1	6	6	6
(Australia) Bob Hewitt	6	6	6
LL	(Jamaica) Lance Lumsden	2	4	3
(West Germany) Ingo Buding	2	2	6	2
3	(Australia) Fred Stolle	6	6	4	6

Second round
(Denmark) J Ulrich	7	2	6	6	6
(Brazil) JE Mandarino	9	6	3	4	4
(United Kingdom) M Cox	4	6	6	2	3
(Australia) W Bowrey	6	4	4	6	6
(South Africa) T Ryan	6	7	6
LL	(Japan) I Konishi	4	5	4
(Australia) R Hewitt	6	6	4	6
3	(Australia) F Stolle	2	3	6	2

Third round
(Denmark) J Ulrich	8	7	3	3
(Australia) W Bowrey	10	5	6	6
(South Africa) T Ryan	3	4	6	6	1
(Australia) R Hewitt	6	6	2	3	6

Fourth round
(Australia) W Bowrey	6	4	5	1
(Australia) R Hewitt	4	6	7	6

==== Section 7 ====
First round
(Spain) José Luis Arilla	20	4	6	6	6
(Chile) Patricio Rodríguez	22	6	2	2	2
(Australia) Dick Crealy	4	2	10
(United Kingdom) Billy Knight	6	6	12
(South Africa) Abe Segal	6	6	6
(Romania) Ion Țiriac	4	2	3
(Denmark) Jan Leschly	6	9	6
(Rhodesia) Frank Salomon	4	7	4
(South Africa) Ray Moore	2	6	10	6
Q	(United Kingdom) John Clifton	6	2	8	1
Q	(United Kingdom) Geoffrey Bluett	3	1	7	5
(United States) John Pickens	6	6	5	7
(India) Premjit Lall	6	6	6
(South Africa) Colin Zeeman	3	4	1
(Czechoslovakia) Jan Kodeš	4	4	5
7	(South Africa) Cliff Drysdale	6	6	7

Second round
(Spain) JL Arilla	4	7	6	6
(United Kingdom) W Knight	6	5	4	2
(South Africa) A Segal	6	2	6	4
(Denmark) J Leschly	8	6	3	6
(South Africa) R Moore	5	2	2
(United States) J Pickens	7	6	6
(India) P Lall	6	6	3
7	(South Africa) C Drysdale	8	8	6

Third round
(Spain) JL Arilla	3	2	6
(Denmark) J Leschly	6	6	8
(United States) J Pickens	3	2	2
7	(South Africa) C Drysdale	6	6	6

Fourth round
(Denmark) J Leschly	6	1	6	6	6
7	(South Africa) C Drysdale	3	6	8	3	8

==== Section 8 ====
First round
(United Kingdom) Graham Stilwell	4	2	6	13
(United States) Cliff Richey	6	6	3	15
(Australia) Terry Addison	6	9	3	4	6
Q	(South Africa) Ray Weedon	4	7	6	6	2
(France) Georges Goven	6	6	7
(Argentina) Eduardo Soriano	3	4	5
(Australia) Bob Howe	6	6	6
Q	(Canada) Robert Puddicombe	1	2	4
(United Kingdom) Paul Hutchins	3	3	4
(Belgium) Eric Drossart	6	6	6
(United Kingdom) Peter Curtis	6	6	6
LL	(South Africa) Barry Butcher	1	4	3
(Australia) Allan Stone	5	6	2	7	6
(Ecuador) Miguel Olvera	7	2	6	5	0
Q	(United Kingdom) Ted Beards	2	4	4
2	(Australia) Tony Roche	6	6	6

Second round
(United States) C Richey	5	6	6	6
(Australia) T Addison	7	2	4	4
(France) G Goven	2	7	6	4	6
(Australia) R Howe	6	5	3	6	2
(Belgium) E Drossart	1	2	10
(United Kingdom) P Curtis	6	6	12
(Australia) A Stone	1	8	4
2	(Australia) A Roche	6	10	6

Third round
(United States) C Richey	6	7	9
(France) G Goven	2	5	7
(United Kingdom) P Curtis	2	6	6	2
2	(Australia) A Roche	6	4	8	6

Fourth round
(United States) C Richey	4	4	4
2	(Australia) A Roche	6	6	6

Preceded by 1966 French Championships	Grand Slams; Men's Singles	Succeeded by 1966 U.S. Championships
