= 1965 in tennis =

This page covers all the important events in the sport of tennis in 1965. It provides the results of notable tournaments throughout the year on both the men's and women's ILTF tennis circuits.

== Australian Open ==
| Category | Champion(s) | Finalist(s) | Score |
|---|---|---|---|
| Men's singles | (Australia) Roy Emerson | (Australia) Fred Stolle | 7–9, 2–6, 6–4, 7–5, 6–1 |
| Women's singles | (Australia) Margaret Smith | (Brazil) Maria Bueno | 5–7, 6–4, 5–2 retired |
| Men's doubles | (Australia) John Newcombe (Australia) Tony Roche | (Australia) Roy Emerson (Australia) Fred Stolle | 3–6, 4–6, 13–11, 6–3, 6–4 |
| Women's doubles | (Australia) Margaret Smith (Australia) Lesley Turner | (Australia) Robyn Ebbern (United States) Billie Jean Moffitt | 1–6, 6–2, 6–3 |
| Mixed doubles | (Australia) Robyn Ebbern and (Australia) Margaret Smith (Australia) Owen Davidson and (Australia) John Newcombe | | (final not played) (Note: The mixed doubles final was not played because of bad weather) |

== French Open ==
| Category | Champion(s) | Finalist(s) | Score |
|---|---|---|---|
| Men's singles | (Australia) Fred Stolle | (Australia) Tony Roche | 3–6, 6–0, 6–2, 6–3 |
| Women's singles | (Australia) Lesley Turner | (Australia) Margaret Smith | 6–3, 6–4 |
| Men's doubles | (Australia) Roy Emerson (Australia) Fred Stolle | (Australia) Ken Fletcher (Australia) Bob Hewitt | 6–8, 6–3, 8–6, 6–2 |
| Women's doubles | (Australia) Margaret Smith (Australia) Lesley Turner | (France) Françoise Durr (France) Janine Lieffrig | 6–3, 6–1 |
| Mixed doubles | (Australia) Margaret Smith (Australia) Ken Fletcher | (Brazil) Maria Bueno (Australia) John Newcombe | 6–4, 6–4 |

== Wimbledon ==
| Category | Champion(s) | Finalist(s) | Score |
|---|---|---|---|
| Men's singles | (Australia) Roy Emerson | (Australia) Fred Stolle | 6–2, 6–4, 6–4 |
| Women's singles | (Australia) Margaret Smith | (Brazil) Maria Bueno | 6–4, 7–5 |
| Men's doubles | (Australia) John Newcombe (Australia) Tony Roche | (Australia) Ken Fletcher (Australia) Bob Hewitt | 7–5, 6–3, 6–4 |
| Women's doubles | (Brazil) Maria Bueno (United States) Billie Jean King | (France) Françoise Dürr (France) Janine Lieffrig | 6–2, 7–5 |
| Mixed doubles | (Australia) Ken Fletcher (Australia) Margaret Smith | (Australia) Tony Roche (Australia) Judy Tegart | 12–10, 6–3 |

== US Open ==
| Category | Champion(s) | Finalist(s) | Score |
|---|---|---|---|
| Men's singles | (Spain) Manuel Santana | (South Africa) Cliff Drysdale | 6–2, 7–9, 7–5, 6–1 |
| Women's singles | (Australia) Margaret Smith | (United States) Billie Jean Moffitt | 8–6, 7–5 |
| Men's doubles | (Australia) Roy Emerson (Australia) Fred Stolle | (United States) Frank Froehling (United States) Charles Pasarell | 6–4, 10–12, 7–5, 6–3 |
| Women's doubles | (United States) Carole Graebner (United States) Nancy Richey | (United States) Billie Jean Moffitt (United States) Karen Susman | 6–4, 6–4 |
| Mixed doubles | (Australia) Margaret Smith (Australia) Fred Stolle | (Australia) Judy Tegart (United States) Frank Froehling | 6–2, 6–2 |
