= 1963 U.S. National Championships – Men's singles =

Men's singles
- 1963 U.S. National Championships

Final
- Champion: (Mexico) Rafael Osuna
- Runner-up: (United States) Frank Froehling
- Score: 7–5, 6–4, 6–2

Details
- Draw: 128
- Seeds: 8

Events
Singles	men	women
Doubles	men	women
- U.S. National Championships

Rafael Osuna defeated Frank Froehling 7–5, 6–4, 6–2 in the final to win the men's singles tennis title at the 1963 U.S. National Championships.

== Seeds ==
The seeded players are listed below. Rafael Osuna is the champion; others show the round in which they were eliminated.

1. (United States) Chuck McKinley (semifinals)
2. (Australia) Roy Emerson (fourth round)
3. (United States) Dennis Ralston (quarterfinals)
4. (Mexico) Rafael Osuna (champion)
5. (Australia) Ken Fletcher (third round)
6. (United Kingdom) Bobby Wilson (quarterfinals)
7. (United States) Eugene Scott (third round)
8. (United States) Ham Richardson (third round)

== Draw ==
=== Key ===
- Q = Qualifier
- WC = Wild card
- LL = Lucky loser
- r = Retired

=== Final eight ===
Quarterfinals
1	(United States) Chuck McKinley	6	4	4	8	6
(Brazil) Thomaz Koch	4	6	6	6	4
4	(Mexico) Rafael Osuna	3	9	6	6
(United States) Marty Riessen	6	7	3	3
(Brazil) Ronald Barnes	6	7	6
3	(United States) Dennis Ralston	4	5	3
6	(United Kingdom) Bobby Wilson	8	6	3	3	7
(United States) Frank Froehling	6	4	6	6	9

Semifinals
1	(United States) Chuck McKinley	4	4	8
4	(Mexico) Rafael Osuna	6	6	10
(Brazil) Ronald Barnes	3	1	4
(United States) Frank Froehling	6	6	6

Final
4	(Mexico) Rafael Osuna	7	6	6
(United States) Frank Froehling	5	4	2

=== Earlier rounds ===
==== Section 1 ====
First round
1	(United States) McKinley	4	3	8	6	6
(Ecuador) Zuleta	6	6	6	3	1
(Czechoslovakia) Javorský	7	6	7	6
(Japan) Fujii	5	1	9	2
(South Africa) Wood	8	6	6
(United States) Powless	6	2	4
(West Germany) Ecklebe	8	6	6
(United States) Siska	6	2	3
(United States) McManus	4	6	6	6
(Belgium) De Gronckel	6	2	3	2
(United States) Seixas	13	6	6	6
(United States) Bowditch	15	4	0	0
(United States) Fentress	6	6	6
(Denmark) Hedelund	0	2	2
(United States) Nagler	6	6	6
(Egypt) Ali	3	3	1

Second round
1	(United States) McKinley	6	6	6
(Czechoslovakia) Javorský	2	4	3
(South Africa) Wood	7	6	9
(West Germany) Ecklebe	5	4	7
(United States) McManus	5	9	6	4
(United States) Seixas	7	7	8	6
(United States) Fentress	3	1	0
(United States) Nagler	6	6	6

Third round
1	(United States) McKinley	6	6	8
(South Africa) Wood	4	4	6
(United States) Seixas	3	6	13	12	1
(United States) Nagler	6	1	11	14	6

Fourth round
1	(United States) McKinley	5	6	6	6
(United States) Nagler	7	4	4	2

==== Section 2 ====
First round
7	(United States) Scott	6	6	6
(United States) Jackson	4	4	2
(United States) Dell	4	7	6	6	6
(United States) Sullivan	6	9	2	4	0
(Canada) Bedard	6	6	5	7
(Philippines) Hernandez	4	1	7	5
(Brazil) Koch	6	4	7	6	6
(United States) Hoffman Jr	4	6	9	3	1
(United States) Sammis
(United States) Williams	w/o
(United States) Higgins	6	6	6
(Australia) Sherriff	2	4	4
(Hungary) Gulyás	6	3	6	6
(United States) Tully	2	6	4	3
(United States) Skogstad	6	6	4	6
(United States) Jennings	4	2	6	3

Second round
7	(United States) Scott	4	7	6	7
(United States) Dell	6	5	3	5
(Canada) Bedard	4	7	2
(Brazil) Koch	6	9	6
(United States) Sammis	0	3	1
(United States) Higgins	6	6	6
(Hungary) Gulyás	2	6	6	4	6
(United States) Skogstad	6	3	3	6	4

Third round
7	(United States) Scott	6	4	3	4
(Brazil) Koch	4	6	6	6
(United States) Higgins	5	4	3
(Hungary) Gulyás	7	6	6

Fourth round
(Brazil) Koch	7	6	6
(Hungary) Gulyás	5	3	3

==== Section 3 ====
First round
4	(Mexico) Osuna	6	6	8
(France) Rouyer	1	1	6
(United States) Beste	6	6	6
(United States) Drilling	4	4	3
(Australia) Roche	6	6	8
(United States) Werksman	1	1	6
(Japan) Ishiguro	6	6	6
(United States) Sack	1	1	0
(Finland) Nyyssönen	7	6	7
(United States) Wright	5	2	5
(West Germany) Scholl	8	10	6
(Canada) Carpenter	6	8	3
(South Africa) Drysdale	6	6	6
(Canada) Fontana	1	4	2
(France) Darmon	13	3	8	6	10
(New Zealand) Crookenden	15	6	6	1	8

Second round
4	(Mexico) Osuna	6	6	13
(United States) Beste	2	4	11
(Australia) Roche	6	6	6
(Japan) Ishiguro	0	4	4
(Finland) Nyyssönen	1	6	1	6	6
(West Germany) Scholl	6	4	6	0	1
(South Africa) Drysdale	9	2	8	0	2r
(France) Darmon	7	6	6	6	5

Third round
4	(Mexico) Osuna	3	6	6	6
(Australia) Roche	6	1	2	2
(Finland) Nyyssönen	3	1	2
(France) Darmon	6	6	6

Fourth round
4	(Mexico) Osuna	6	6	4	3	6
(France) Darmon	4	2	6	6	2

==== Section 4 ====
First round
8	(United States) Richardson	6	6	6
(United States) Lieberman	3	1	1
(Belgium) Drossart	1	6	3	6	6
(United States) Schwartz	6	3	6	2	2
(United Kingdom) Mills	6	6	6
(United States) Seewagen	2	1	1
(United States) Sanderlin	1	5	7	6	6
(Italy) Maggi	6	7	5	1	1
(United States) Ashe	6	5	6	6
(Mexico) Ochoa	4	7	4	4
(United States) Perry	6	6	6
(Canada) Belkin	4	4	2
(United States) Riessen	7	8	6
(United States) Buck	5	6	4
(United States) Fisher	6	4	6	6
(Czechoslovakia) Strobl	4	6	3	2

Second round
8	(United States) Richardson	6	6	6
(Belgium) Drossart	2	2	2
(United Kingdom) Mills	7	1	3	6	3
(United States) Sanderlin	5	6	6	3	6
(United States) Ashe	3	7	6	6
(United States) Perry	6	5	2	3
(United States) Riessen	1	6	3	6	6
(United States) Fisher	6	4	6	1	2

Third round
8	(United States) Richardson	6	6	6	3	3
(United States) Sanderlin	1	8	4	6	6
(United States) Ashe	3	6	6	6
(United States) Riessen	6	8	2	8

Fourth round
(United States) Sanderlin	4	2	4
(United States) Riessen	6	6	6

==== Section 5 ====
First round
(United Kingdom) Taylor	6	3	6	7
(United States) Lenoir	3	6	3	5
(New Zealand) McDonald	6	6	6
(France) Abdesselam	4	4	3
(Australia) Ryan	6	3	6	6
(United States) Lloyd	1	6	4	4
(France) Barthès	6	6	3	6	8
(United States) Rubinoff	3	2	6	8	6
(Brazil) Barnes	6	6	6
(United States) Speicher	4	2	2
(United States) Edlefsen	6	6	6
(Mexico) Donnadieu	2	3	4
(United States) Holmberg
(Jamaica) Lumsden	w/o
5	(Australia) Fletcher	9	4	6	14
(India) Lall	7	6	1	12

Second round
(United Kingdom) Taylor	6	6	6
(New Zealand) McDonald	2	4	0
(Australia) Ryan	6	5	8	6	1
(France) Barthès	2	7	10	0	6
(Brazil) Barnes	2	6	3	6	6
(United States) Edlefsen	6	1	6	3	4
(United States) Holmberg	5	7	9	6	3
5	(Australia) Fletcher	7	9	7	4	6

Third round
(United Kingdom) Taylor	6	6	3	4	6
(France) Barthès	1	4	6	6	1
(Brazil) Barnes	6	6	2	6	7
5	(Australia) Fletcher	8	2	6	4	5

Fourth round
(United Kingdom) Taylor	5	6	9	5	6
(Brazil) Barnes	7	2	7	7	8

==== Section 6 ====
First round
(South Africa) Phillips	7	6	7
(United Kingdom) Hann	5	3	5
(Australia) Newcombe	6	7	7
(United States) Hernando	4	5	5
(United States) Schunck	6	7	7
(Southern Rhodesia) Kileff	1	5	5
(Puerto Rico) Rosselló
(Haiti) Baker	w/o
(Netherlands) Hajer	6	6	2	10
(United States) Schad	3	4	6	8
(Australia) Davidson	6	6	6
(Sweden) Hallberg	3	4	4
(United States) Sorlien	6	6	6
(Turkey) Bari	3	4	3
3	(United States) Ralston	6	6	6
(United States) Johnson	1	2	2

Second round
(South Africa) Phillips	7	6	2
(Australia) Newcombe	9	8	6
(United States) Schunck	16	6	6
(Puerto Rico) Rosselló	14	4	4
(Netherlands) Hajer	3	6	3	2
(Australia) Davidson	6	3	6	6
(United States) Sorlien	2	10	1	5
3	(United States) Ralston	6	8	6	7

Third round
(Australia) Newcombe	8	6	6
(United States) Schunck	6	1	4
(Australia) Davidson	4	2	8	8	4
3	(United States) Ralston	6	6	6	6	6

Fourth round
(Australia) Newcombe	3	4	6	5
3	(United States) Ralston	6	6	3	7

==== Section 7 ====
First round
(United States) Sokol	6	6	6
(United States) Cooper	3	1	2
(United States) Neely	8	6	6
(United States) Slobin	6	4	4
(United States) Buchholz	6	6	7
(United States) Beck	1	1	5
(United States) Power	6	3	6	8	9
(United States) Stoneman	4	6	8	6	7
(United States) Pasarell	8	6	6	6
(United States) Fox	10	4	4	3
(United States) Graebner	6	9	7
(United States) Parker	2	7	5
(United States) Newman	7	7	6	6
(United States) Tym	9	5	2	4
6	(United Kingdom) Wilson	6	6	6
(United States) Schnaars	4	3	2

Second round
(United States) Sokol	6	2	2
(United States) Neely	8	6	6
(United States) Buchholz	7	6	6	6
(United States) Power	9	2	4	3
(United States) Pasarell	6	6	6	7
(United States) Graebner	3	3	8	5
(United States) Newman	4	7	5	4
6	(United Kingdom) Wilson	6	5	7	6

Third round
(United States) Neely	4	4	7	4
(United States) Buchholz	6	6	5	6
(United States) Pasarell	5	6	12
6	(United Kingdom) Wilson	7	8	14

Fourth round
(United States) Buchholz	3	0	1
6	(United Kingdom) Wilson	6	6	6

==== Section 8 ====
First round
(United States) Froehling	6	6	6
(United States) Sweeney	1	3	2
(United States) Reed	6	8	6
(United States) Isaacs	1	6	4
(Canada) Godbout	6	7	6
(United States) Morgan	1	5	0
(Mexico) Palafox	6	6	6
(United States) Turville	1	3	2
(United States) Harrison	2	7	3	6	14
(United States) Fitzgibbon	6	5	6	4	12
(United Kingdom) Baxter	6	6	7
(Portugal) Cohen	3	4	5
(United States) Richey	6	6	5	6	6
(United States) Osborne	2	8	7	2	4
2	(Australia) Emerson	6	6	6
(United States) Steele III	1	4	2

Second round
(United States) Froehling	7	8	6	6
(United States) Reed	9	6	3	4
(Canada) Godbout	5	4	5
(Mexico) Palafox	7	6	7
(United States) Harrison	4	6	6	6
(United Kingdom) Baxter	6	2	2	1
(United States) Richey	3	2	5
2	(Australia) Emerson	6	6	7

Third round
(United States) Froehling	6	6	6
(Mexico) Palafox	4	1	4
(United States) Harrison	4	2	0
2	(Australia) Emerson	6	6	6

Fourth round
(United States) Froehling	6	4	9	6
2	(Australia) Emerson	4	6	7	2

Preceded by 1963 Wimbledon Championships – Men's singles	Grand Slam men's singles	Succeeded by 1964 Australian Championships – Men's singles
