= Keith Carpenter =

Canadian tennis player (born 1941)

- Country (sports): Canada
- Born: August 3, 1941 (age 84)
- Height: 6 ft 2 in (188 cm)
- Plays: Left-handed

Singles

Grand Slam singles results
- French Open: 2R (1964)
- Wimbledon: 2R (1963, 1964, 1965, 1966)
- US Open: 4R (1965)

Keith A. Carpenter (born August 3, 1941) was one of Canada's top men's tennis players during the 1960s.

== Tennis career ==
=== Overview ===
Carpenter's best result was winning the Canadian Open Men's Doubles Championship in 1966 alongside his older brother, Michael Carpenter. It was their first and only Grand Slam Event win for both brothers' careers and a proud moment in Canadian tennis history. Fourth round in singles of the 1965 U.S. Nationals. The year before he also reached the third round. Carpenter reached the second round at Wimbledon every year from 1963, his first appearance in the main draw, which he reached through qualifying, through 1966. In 1964 he also reached the second round at Roland Garros, his only time in three appearances in the main draw.

In doubles, Carpenter competed in the main draw of a grand slam event twice. At the 1968 Wimbledon Championships, he and partner Berry Geraghty lost in the opening round. The following year, he and his partner, compatriot John Sharpe, reached the second round, where they lost in straight sets to the tandem of Roy Emerson and Rod Laver.

In Davis Cup, Carpenter competed for Canada each year from 1963 through 1968. His overall record was 1 win, 4 losses in singles, and 1 win, 6 losses in doubles, in a total of 7 ties. Canada lost all but one of these match-ups, their only victory coming over Finland in the first round of Europe Group in 1966. In the following round that year they lost to France 5-0 at Roland Garros.

Carpenter was inducted into the Canadian Tennis Hall of Fame in 1996.

=== 1960 — 1962 ===
Carpenter competed in singles in the main draw of three U.S. National Championships over three consecutive years before contesting any other majors, losing in the first round each time. As a 19 years old, he lost in the U.S. Nationals to Eduardo Zuleta in three sets. The following year, Carpenter lost to eventual quarter-finalist Donald Dell. In 1962, he lost to Bodo Nitsche comprehensively in straight sets.

=== 1963 ===
Carpenter played both the U.S. Championship and Wimbledon, the later for the first time. At Wimbledon, he won his first match at a major event, reaching the second round. Qualifying for the main draw, Carpenter beat Mexican Angel Ochoa in straight sets. In the second round he faced Japanese Osamu Ishiguro. Carpenter leveled the match at a set apiece before dropping the next two, the last 15-17, to lose. At the U.S. Nationals, Carpenter fell again in the first round, and again to a German player, Peter Scholl.

=== 1964 ===
Carpenter had his best year in majors, making it past the first round of all three he participated in, the French Championships, Wimbledon, and Forest Hills. At Roland Garros, he beat Briton Billy Knight, possibly by default, in the first round, while in the second, Carpenter lost in four sets to Jean-Claude Barclay. At Wimbledon, Carpenter, for the second time in a row, reached the second round as well. He defeated lucky loser Briton Geoff Bluett in straight sets before falling to eventual quarter-finalist Christian Kuhnke. Then at the U.S. Championships, Carpenter reached the third round of a major tournament for the first time. He swept aside David Sandlerlin in the first round and then beat Dutchman Evert Schneider in five sets. Carpenter then was defeated, however, by American Raymond Senkowski.

=== 1965 ===
Carpenter earned his best result in a major in reaching the fourth round of the 1965 U.S. National Championships. Not competing in the main draw of the French, Carpenter first however reached the second round at Wimbledon for the third straight year. Carpenter eliminated qualifier Pat Cramer in the first round in four sets before succumbing to Inge Buding. At Forest Hills, Carpenter began his run by beating Eugene Cantin in three sets. He got through his second round match too without dropping a set, a win over Leif Beck. Carpenter was pushed to the limit, however, by John Powless, prevailing in a five-set match. In the fourth round, he went down in straight sets, however, to Charlie Pasarell.

=== 1966 ===
Carpenter competed in The Canadian Men's Doubles Championships in 1966 (Vancouver Lawn Tennis Club) alongside his brother, Michael Carpenter. As a final result, Michael and Keith Carpenter won the doubles title that summer. As two years earlier, Carpenter competed in the main draws at Roland Garros, Wimbledon, and Forrest Hills, but with less success in terms of results. At the French Championships, he lost in the first round, to Georges Goven. At Wimbledon, Carpenter defeated veteran Floridian Gardnar Mulloy, before falling to South African Keith Diepraam in four sets. At the U.S. Nationals, he came from 2 sets down to defeat Bailey Brown in round one. He lost in the second round in straight sets, however, to Frenchman Daniel Contet.

=== 1967 ===
Carpenter in the first round of the main draw at each the French, Wimbledon, and U.S. Championships in Canada's centennial year. In the Roland Garros main draw for the last time as it turned out, Carpenter lost to Pole Wieslaw Gasiorek in four sets. At Wimbledon, he went down to No. 2 seed Roy Emerson in straight sets, while at the U.S. Championships, Carpenter lost to Marty Riessen.

== Senior circuit tennis ==
Carpenter has stayed active as a player in masters or senior circuit tennis. His ITF Senior Circuit high ranking is No. 167, achieved on November 10, 2006. Carpenter won the men's 65 and over Canadian national championship in singles in 2006. In 2007 and 2008, however, he was not listed in the Canadian rankings.

== Personal life ==
Carpenter attended Concordia University, where he obtained a Bachelor of Science degree. Born in Birmingham, England, he resides or has resided in King City, Ontario.

Carpenter and fellow former Canadian Davis Cupper Harry Fauquier have since 1974 operated a tennis court accessory company, Tennex Systems, Inc.
