= 1963 Australian Championships – Men's singles =

Men's singles
- 1963 Australian Championships

Final
- Champion: (Australia) Roy Emerson
- Runner-up: (Australia) Ken Fletcher
- Score: 6–3, 6–3, 6–1

Details
- Draw: 44
- Seeds: 8

Events
Singles	men	women
Doubles	men	women
- Australian Championships

First-seeded Roy Emerson defeated Ken Fletcher 6–3, 6–3, 6–1 in the final to win the men's singles tennis title at the 1963 Australian Championships.

== Seeds ==
The seeded players are listed below. Roy Emerson is the champion; others show the round in which they were eliminated.

1. (Australia) Roy Emerson (champion)
2. (Australia) Ken Fletcher (finalist)
3. (Australia) Bob Hewitt (semifinals)
4. (Australia) Fred Stolle (semifinals)
5. (Australia) Martin Mulligan (third round)
6. (Australia) John Newcombe (quarterfinals)
7. (Australia) John Fraser (quarterfinals)
8. (Australia) Bob Howe (quarterfinals)

== Draw ==
=== Key ===
- Q = Qualifier
- WC = Wild card
- LL = Lucky loser
- r = Retired

=== Finals ===
Quarterfinals
1	(Australia) Roy Emerson	6	7	6
7	(Australia) John Fraser	1	5	2
3	(Australia) Bob Hewitt	6	6	5	6
6	(Australia) John Newcombe	3	4	7	4
(Australia) Owen Davidson	7	4	2	2
4	(Australia) Fred Stolle	5	6	6	6
8	(Australia) Bob Howe	4	7	2
2	(Australia) Ken Fletcher	6	9	6

Semifinals
1	(Australia) Roy Emerson	8	6	3	9
3	(Australia) Bob Hewitt	6	4	6	7
4	(Australia) Fred Stolle	3	4	5
2	(Australia) Ken Fletcher	6	6	7

Final
1	(Australia) Roy Emerson	6	6	6
2	(Australia) Ken Fletcher	3	3	1

=== Earlier rounds ===
==== Section 1 ====
First round
(Australia) Crealy	3	6	6	8
(Australia) Street	6	3	4	6
(Belgium) Drossart	6	6	6
(Australia) Beers	4	3	2
(Australia) Baulch	1	6	6	6
(Australia) Brien	6	2	0	3

Second round
1	(Australia) Emerson	6	6	8
(Australia) Crealy	4	4	6
(Australia) Phillips-Moore	7	6	6
(Belgium) Drossart	5	2	2
7	(Australia) Fraser	6	6	3	6
(Australia) Pares	3	4	6	4
(United Kingdom) Taylor	6	6	6
(Australia) Baulch	3	2	4

Third round
1	(Australia) Emerson	6	6	6
(Australia) Phillips-Moore	3	1	2
7	(Australia) Fraser	6	5	6	0	7
(United Kingdom) Taylor	2	7	4	6	5

Quarterfinals
1	(Australia) Emerson	6	7	6
7	(Australia) Fraser	1	5	2

==== Section 2 ====
First round
(Australia) Harris	1	6	6	6
(United Kingdom) Matthews	6	3	4	1
(Australia) Clayton	6	3	6	6
(Australia) Moore	0	6	2	0
(Australia) Cottrill	6	7	6
(Australia) Stone	2	5	0

Second round
3	(Australia) Hewitt	6	6	6
(Australia) Harris	4	4	0
(West Germany) Elschenbroich	4	6	2	3
(Australia) Clayton	6	2	6	6
6	(Australia) Newcombe	4	4	6	6	6
(Australia) Tobin	6	6	2	0	2
(Australia) McPherson	6	8	1	6	5
(Australia) Cottrill	4	10	6	1	7

Third round
3	(Australia) Hewitt	6	6	6
(Australia) Clayton	1	1	4
6	(Australia) Newcombe	6	6	6
(Australia) Cottrill	4	0	0

Quarterfinals
3	(Australia) Hewitt	6	6	5	6
6	(Australia) Newcombe	3	4	7	4

==== Section 3 ====
First round
(Australia) Bowrey	6	5	6	6
(Australia) Potter	3	7	3	4
(United Kingdom) Cox
(Australia) O'Brien	w/o
(Australia) Guse	6	6	4	6
(Australia) Harris	1	4	6	3

Second round
(Australia) Bowrey	6	3	3	6	3
(Australia) Davidson	2	6	6	3	6
(Australia) Nette	3	4	6	3
5	(Australia) Mulligan	6	6	4	6
(United Kingdom) Cox	6	6	1	6
(Australia) Hughes	4	0	6	3
(Australia) Guse	1	1	1
4	(Australia) Stolle	6	6	6

Third round
(Australia) Davidson	6	9	10
5	(Australia) Mulligan	1	7	8
(United Kingdom) Cox	3	4	4
4	(Australia) Stolle	6	6	6

Quarterfinals
(Australia) Davidson	7	4	2	2
4	(Australia) Stolle	5	6	6	6

==== Section 4 ====
First round
(United Kingdom) Wooldridge
(Australia) Hay	w/o
(United Kingdom) Stilwell	4	6	6	3	6
(Australia) Keller	6	1	3	6	4
(Australia) Sharpe	8	6	6
(Belgium) Van Der Borght	6	0	0

Second round
(United Kingdom) Wooldridge
(Australia) Jacques	w/o
(Australia) Stephens	6	4	3	3
8	(Australia) Howe	2	6	6	6
(United Kingdom) Stilwell	4	2	2
(Australia) Hillebrand	6	6	6
(Australia) Sharpe	4	6	4
2	(Australia) Fletcher	6	8	6

Third round
(United Kingdom) Wooldridge	2	10	3	1
8	(Australia) Howe	6	8	6	6
(Australia) Hillebrand	10	0	4
2	(Australia) Fletcher	12	6	6

Quarterfinals
8	(Australia) Howe	4	7	2
2	(Australia) Fletcher	6	9	6

Preceded by 1962 U.S. National Championships	Grand Slam men's singles	Succeeded by 1963 French Championships
