= Stanley Matthews (tennis) =

British tennis player

- Full name: Stanley John Matthews
- Country (sports): United Kingdom
- Residence: Weston, Connecticut, United States
- Born: 20 November 1945 (age 80) Stoke-upon-Trent, Staffordshire, England
- Retired: 1973
- Plays: Right-handed

Singles
- Career record: 306-283
- Career titles: 12

Grand Slam singles results
- Australian Open: 1R (1963, 1964)
- French Open: 2R (1967, 1969)
- Wimbledon: 2R (1963, 1969)
- US Open: 2R (1971)

Doubles
- Career record: 4–13

Stanley John Matthews (born 20 November 1945) is an English former professional tennis player. He became Wimbledon Boys' Champion in 1962 and reached the second round of the French Open, Wimbledon and the US Open. He is the son of former professional footballer Sir Stanley Matthews (1915-2000).

== Football career ==
Matthews' first foray in sport was via football, and, like his father, he played on the wing. "But I stopped playing soccer, as we call it in America, when I was 12," he explained in 2007. "I was fairly good, but whoever I played, they kicked the shit out of me. I came with a name, and the mentality was, 'We're going to get Stanley Matthews' son.' "

== Tennis career ==
In 1958, Matthews' father arranged for him to attend the Lawn Tennis Association in London. He lived with the family of Charlie Chester, a friend of his father, in North Finchley. In the morning he would work with a private tutor; in the afternoon he would practise at Queen's Club.

Matthews was British Junior Champion between 1960 and 1962, the only three-times winner of the title.

In 1962, Matthews won the Wimbledon Boys' Championship. He can remember the final point by point. "It was against Alexander Metreveli, who went on to be the top Russian and lost in the final of a Wimbledon senior." The match went the distance, and Matthews won 7–5 in the final set. He was the last British winner of the Wimbledon boys' tournament until Henry Searle in 2023.

In Grand Slam tournaments, he reached the second round of Wimbledon in 1963 and 1969. He attained the second round of the 1967 French Open and in the 1969 French Opens he won his most notable singles victory in a Grand Slam event, beating Ilie Năstase in the first round in a close five set match. He reached the second round of the 1971 US Open. He qualified for the first round of Wimbledon for 11 consecutive years, from 1963 to 1973. He also partook in 17 doubles matches, winning four times.

In his short career, Matthews won 12 singles titles.

In 1965 he won the Northumberland Championships defeating David Lloyd in the semifinal and Gerald Battrick in the final.

In 1966, Matthews won the London Hard Court Championships with wins over Battrick, John Barrett, Clay Iles, and Allan Stone in the final.

In 1967, Matthews won the Surrey Hard Court Championships, defeating Keith Wooldridge in the final. He beat his coach, John Barrett, in the semifinals. The following year, he defeated Wooldridge again in the final of the East of England Championships.

In 1971, Matthews represented Britain in the Davis Cup, losing to Yugoslav Boro Jovanović in five sets.

== Assessment ==
Despite Matthews' success in the junior ranks, his coach, John Barrett, stated that "ultimately, he just wasn't good enough". However, Matthews would win more tournaments in his playing career than Barrett achieved. Matthews' father said "There is no doubt my reputation did put some pressure on him. I know it worried him a bit, being in my shadow. I hoped he might overcome it."

Matthews junior partially concurs: "Even though it wasn't football, it was a lot of pressure to live up to the name of Matthews. There would be pictures of my father and me in the papers, and they started to call me the next Fred Perry. Sure, being Dad's son opened some doors, but it also made things harder. Instead of being congratulated if I did well, I was expected to. And if I didn't do well, they'd say 'He's not as good as his father.' Unfortunately, that's how it is. It goes with the territory."

"Obviously, I would have liked to have done better, though I didn't have a bad career. But it was becoming more and more difficult to make a living out of tennis. Looking back, certain aspects were not as good as they should have been. I was a serve and volleyer with a weak serve. If I'd had a serve like Andy Roddick's, I would have done much better. I wasn't quite good enough to be one of the best."

== Post-retirement ==
In 1973 Matthews quit playing tennis and tried his hand in the business world, selling air bubbles to cover tennis courts; however, the growing popularity of squash meant that there were fewer and fewer outdoor courts.

Aged 29, Matthews moved to the United States, and became a coach at Harry Hopman's Port Washington Tennis Academy and also in Norwalk, Connecticut. At the former, he worked with a promising 15-year-old John McEnroe. "I was still fresh off the tour at the time, so could give him a decent game."

In 1976 he became manager at the Four Seasons Racquet Club in Wilton, Connecticut, and has been there ever since. Nine years later, he bought out the original owner. "You can always say, 'Gee whizz, I could have done better' but in terms of how my life turned out, I'm very happy. I'm [at the time of interview] still the last British male to win a singles tournament at Wimbledon, and I'm proud of that. For the past 30 years I have considered myself an entrepreneur, and I've managed that in the States with no name recognition."

In 1981, Matthews briefly picked up his racquet again after eight years to take part in the United States Tennis Association's National Men's 35 Clay Court Championships at the Palm Beach Polo and Country Club in Palm Beach, Florida.

== Personal life ==
Matthews was born to Betty and Stanley Matthews on 20 November 1945. He was the couple's second child after Jean, who was born six years earlier. He is married to Joy, with two stepchildren, Greg and Kristy Moran.

== Grand Slam singles performance timeline ==
Key
W	F	SF	QF	#R	RR	Q#	DNQ	A	NH

(W) winner; (F) finalist; (SF) semifinalist; (QF) quarterfinalist; (#R) rounds 4, 3, 2, 1; (RR) round-robin stage; (Q#) qualification round; (DNQ) did not qualify; (A) absent; (NH) not held; (SR) strike rate (events won / competed); (W–L) win–loss record.

Tournament	1962	1963	1964	1965	1966	1967	1968	1969	1970	1971	1972	1973	W–L
Australian Open	A	1R	1R	A	A	A	A	A	A	A	A	A	0–2
French Open	1R	A	A	A	1R	2R	A	2R	1R	1R	A	A	2–6
Wimbledon	A	2R	1R	1R	1R	1R	1R	2R	1R	1R	1R	1R	2–11
US Open	A	A	A	A	A	A	A	A	A	2R	PR	A	1–2
Win–loss	0–1	1–2	0–2	0–1	0–2	1–2	0–1	2–2	0–2	1–3	0–2	0–1	5–21

Note: The 1972 US Open had a special preliminary round before the main 128 player draw began.
