= Eric Drossart =

Belgian tennis player

- Country (sports): Belgium
- Born: 21 February 1942 (age 83); Liège, Belgium
- Turned pro: 1958 (amateur tour)
- Plays: Right-handed

Singles
- Career record: 6–18

Grand Slam singles results
- Australian Open: 2R (1963)
- French Open: 2R (1964, 1967, 1970)
- Wimbledon: 2R (1963, 1964, 1966)
- US Open: 2R (1963)

Doubles
- Career record: 6–14

Grand Slam doubles results
- Australian Open: 2R (1963)
- French Open: 3R (1970)
- Wimbledon: 2R (1968)

Eric Claude Drossart (born 21 February 1942) is a former tennis player from Belgium.

== Tennis career ==
Drossart was a regular member of the Belgium Davis Cup team from 1960 until 1972. He made his debut in 1960 against Great Britain during the Europe Zone quarterfinals tie. During his Davis Cup career, he played 6 singles and 4 doubles matches without scoring any victories. During his Davis Cup career, he won 8 of the 33 singles matches and 7 of the 16 doubles matches that he played.

== Later career ==
After his playing career, Drossart joined the International Management Group in 1974, becoming Vice-President and Director of Marketing and Sales in Europe. He was the tournament director of the Belgian Tennis Open from 1978 until 1981 and tournament director of the Belgian Indoor Championships in 1981.

== See also ==
- List of Belgium Davis Cup team representatives
