= Isao Watanabe =

Japanese tennis player (born 1941)

- Country (sports): Japan
- Born: 23 November 1941 (age 84) Minato, Tokyo, Japan
- Plays: 168 cm

Singles
- Career record: 0–9
- Highest ranking: No. 274 (20 December 1974)

Grand Slam singles results
- French Open: 1R (1965, 1966, 1967)
- Wimbledon: 1R (1965, 1966)
Medal record
Representing Japan
Summer Universiade
Silver medal – second place	1967 Tokyo	Doubles

Isao Watanabe (born 23 November 1941) is a Japanese former professional tennis player.

Born in Tokyo, Watanabe competed on the international circuit in the 1960s, featuring in the main draws of the French Open and Wimbledon. He was Manuel Santana's first round opponent when the Spaniard won the 1966 Wimbledon Championships and took the opening set off him, before having to retire hurt while trailing in the second.

Watanabe and his partner Koji Watanabe were the men's doubles silver medalists at the 1967 University Games in Tokyo, losing to Spain's José María Gisbert and Juan Gisbert in the gold medal match.

Between 1967 and 1970 he played Davis Cup tennis for Japan, mostly in doubles. In all seven of his doubles rubbers he partnered Koji Watanabe, who despite sharing the same name was not his brother. They won four of their doubles rubbers as a pairing. His only singles rubber was a win over Hong Kong's Kenneth Tsui in 1970.

== See also ==
- List of Japan Davis Cup team representatives
