= John Crump (tennis) =

British tennis player

- Country (sports): Great Britain
- Born: 31 July 1940 (age 85)

Singles

Grand Slam singles results
- Wimbledon: 1R (1963, 1964)

Doubles

Grand Slam doubles results
- Wimbledon: 3R (1963, 1965)

Grand Slam mixed doubles results
- Wimbledon: 3R (1962)

John Crump (born 31 July 1940) is a British former tennis player.

Crump, a Surrey county player, competed at Wimbledon during the 1960s and 1970s, making it as far as the third round in doubles. He later worked as a tennis manager for sports manufacturing company Dunlop.
