= Harry Fauquier =

Canadian professional tennis player

- Country (sports): Canada
- Born: August 28, 1942 (age 82); Toronto, Ontario, Canada
- Height: 5 ft 5 in (165 cm)

Singles

Grand Slam singles results
- French Open: 2R (1966)
- Wimbledon: 1R (1966)
- US Open: 1R (1961, 1962, 1964, 1967)

Harry Fauquier (born August 28, 1942) is a Canadian former professional tennis player. He was a 1996 inductee into the Canadian Tennis Hall of Fame.

Fauquier, a two-time national junior champion, was a member of the Canada Davis Cup team during the 1960s, featuring in a total of 15 rubbers across eight ties. He also represented Canada at the 1963 Pan American Games and served a stint as Davis Cup captain in the early 1970s.

On the professional tour, Fauquier won a Canadian Open doubles title in 1968 and beat Ron Holmberg in a match at the tournament in 1969. He featured in four editions of the U.S. National Championships and played against Arthur Ashe at the 1969 French Open.

Fauquier played collegiate tennis for the University of Michigan.

Since 1974 he has run a construction company with Davis Cup teammate Keith Carpenter called Tennex Systems, Inc.
