= Ed Rubinoff =

American tennis player (born 1935)

- Full name: Edward Georges Rubinoff
- Country (sports): United States
- Born: July 12, 1935 (age 90) Brooklyn, New York City, U.S.
- College: University of Miami

Singles

Grand Slam singles results
- French Open: 3R (1962)
- Wimbledon: 2R (1963)
- US Open: 1R (1961, 1962, 1963, 1964)

Doubles

Grand Slam doubles results
- Wimbledon: 2R (1962, 1963)

Grand Slam mixed doubles results
- Wimbledon: 3R (1962)
- US Open: F (1963, 1964, 1966)
Medal record
Maccabiah Games
Gold medal – first place	1969 Israel	Mixed Doubles

Edward 'Ed' Rubinoff (born July 12, 1935) is an American former tennis player who was active in the 1960s. He won the 1952 singles title at the Orange Bowl junior tennis tournament, and the 1953 mixed doubles title the following year. At the US Open, he was a mixed doubles finalist three times. At the 1969 Maccabiah Games in Israel, he won a gold medal in mixed doubles with Julie Heldman.

Rubinoff played collegiate tennis for the University of Miami in Coral Gables, Florida.

== Biography ==
Rubinoff was born in Brooklyn, New York and at age 10 moved to Miami Beach, Florida. He became captain of the Miami Beach Senior High School tennis team, and in 1952, he won the National Scholastic singles and doubles titles. He received a full scholarship to the University of Miami.

In 1952, he won the singles title at the Orange Bowl junior tennis tournament, and in 1953, he won the mixed doubles title with Sylvia Ger. In 1962 he won the doubles title with Gardnar Mulloy at the Monte Carlo Championships.

His best performances at the Grand Slam tournaments were achieved in the mixed doubles where he was a runner-up at the US Open on three occasions. In 1963, he reached the final with Judy Tegart and lost to Margaret Court and Ken Fletcher in three sets. In 1964, Tegart and Rubinoff were defeated in the final by Margaret Court and John Newcombe. His last appearance in the final came in 1966 when he teamed with Carol Aucamp and were beaten in straight sets in the final by Donna Floyd and Owen Davidson.

Rubinoff competed in the Wimbledon Championships in 1962 and 1963, entering all three events (singles, doubles, mixed).

At the 1969 Maccabiah Games in Israel, he and American Julie Heldman won a gold medal in the mixed doubles, defeating South African silver medalists Jack Saul and Esmé Emmanuel. He and partner Leonard Schloss won a silver medal in the men's doubles, losing in the finals to American Davis Cup player Allen Fox and Ronald Goldman.

After his tennis career, Rubinoff enrolled at the University of Miami School of Law and graduated in 1966. In the 1980s, he shifted his practice to plaintiff's work, representing individuals rather than insurance companies and corporate defendants. In 1992, Rubinoff and Kutner founded the firm now known as Kutner, Rubinoff & Moss. Rubinoff is a member and former president of the University of Miami Sports Hall of Fame, a member of the Florida Tennis Hall of Fame, and chairman of the board of the Greater Miami Tennis Foundation. Rubinoff is married and has a son and daughter.

== Grand Slam finals ==
=== Mixed doubles (3 runner-ups) ===
Result	Year	Championship	Surface	Partner	Opponents	Score
Loss	1963	U.S. Championships	Grass	(Australia) Judy Tegart	(Australia) Margaret Smith (Australia) Ken Fletcher	6–3, 6–8, 2–6
Loss	1964	U.S. Championships	Grass	(Australia) Judy Tegart	(Australia) Margaret Smith (Australia) John Newcombe	6–10, 6–4, 3–6
Loss	1966	U.S. Championships	Grass	(United States) Carol Aucamp	(United States) Donna Floyd (Australia) Owen Davidson	1–6, 3–6
