= Clay Iles =

English tennis player (1942–2026)

- Country (sports): Great Britain
- Born: 12 July 1942 England
- Died: 15 January 2026 (aged 83)
- Turned pro: 1961 (amateur tour)
- Retired: 1975

Singles
- Career record: 160–39 (80.4%)
- Career titles: 6

Grand Slam singles results
- Wimbledon: 2R (1966, 1968)

Doubles
- Career record: 2R (1963)

Grand Slam doubles results
- Wimbledon: 2R (1966)

Clay Iles (12 July 1942 – 15 January 2026) was a British tennis player and LTA-licensed tennis coach. He also worked as a sports writer and tennis umpire. He competed at the Wimbledon Championships twelve times between 1962 and 1974. He won six career singles titles.

== Career ==
Iles played his first tournament in 1961 at the Connaught Hard Court Championships in Chingford. In major tournaments he took part in 12 tournaments at the Wimbledon Championships where the furthest he progressed was to the second round in the men's singles in 1966 and 1968. In the men's doubles he reached the second round in 1963 and in mixed doubles again second round in 1966.

In 1964 he won his first title at the North of England Hard Court Championships at Scarborough against Mark Cox. He won a second title at the Cannes Carlton International at Cannes against Francois Godbout. In 1969 he won the North of England Hard Court Championships for the second time. He also won the Registered Professional Coaches Championships held at Devonshire Park, Eastbourne three times 1969, 1970 and 1973. In 1975 he played his final tournament at the Cumberland Hard Court Championships.

After retiring from the tennis circuit he later became coach to Clare Wood and Sara Gomer. A sports writer for the Croydon Advertiser, he later provided features for the American magazine World Tennis and the British magazine, Lawn Tennis and the Tennis Pictorial International. He later worked as a tennis umpire.

== Death ==
Iles died on 15 January 2026, at the age of 83.
