= Patrice Beust =

French tennis player

- Full name: Patrice Beust
- Country (sports): France
- Born: 3 September 1944 (age 80); Bois-le-Roi, France
- Plays: Right-handed

Singles
- Career record: 13-32
- Career titles: 0

Grand Slam singles results
- Australian Open: 2R (1975)
- French Open: 3R (1963)
- Wimbledon: 3R (1966)
- US Open: 2R (1966)

Doubles
- Career record: 28-28
- Career titles: 1

Grand Slam doubles results
- French Open: SF (1974)
- Wimbledon: 3R (1968)

Mixed doubles

Grand Slam mixed doubles results
- French Open: SF (1976, 1979)

Patrice Beust (born 3 September 1944) is a former professional tennis player from France.

== Biography ==
Beust played doubles for the France Davis Cup team during the 1960s. He featured in 13 ties and partnered Daniel Contet in all of his matches. It was with Contet that he won his only title on the Grand Prix circuit, the 1972 Monte Carlo Open, a top tier event that was part of the Grand Prix Super Series. He and Contet also made the semi-finals of the 1974 French Open. His other semi-final appearances at Grand Slam level came in the mixed doubles, at the 1976 French Open with Gail Benedetti and at the 1979 French Open with Betty Stöve.

As a singles player he made the third rounds of the 1963 French Championships and the 1966 Wimbledon Championships.

One of the early coaches of Yannick Noah, Beust headed the National Tennis Etudes, which was opened in Nice in 1970. He has worked for many years as a coach for the Fédération Française de Tennis and in 2015 was appointed Director of the international tennis tournament held in Pléneuf-Val-André.

He is an active player on the ITF senior circuit.

== Career finals ==
=== Doubles: 1 (1–1) ===
Result	W/L	Date	Tournament	Surface	Partner	Opponents	Score
Loss	0–1	April 1968	Monte Carlo, Monaco	Clay	(France) Daniel Contet	(Soviet Union) Sergei Likhachev (Soviet Union) Alex Metreveli	7–5, 7–9, 4–6, 7–5, 5–7
Win	1–1	April 1972	Monte Carlo, Monaco	Clay	(France) Daniel Contet	(Czechoslovakia) Jiří Hřebec (Czechoslovakia) František Pála	3–6, 6–1, 12–10, 6–2

== See also ==
- List of France Davis Cup team representatives
