= Jack Saul (tennis) =

South African tennis player

- Country (sports): South Africa

Singles
- Career record: 16–11

Grand Slam singles results
- Wimbledon: 3R (1966)
- US Open: 2R (1967)
Medal record
Maccabiah Games
Silver medal – second place	1969 Israel	Men's Singles
Silver medal – second place	1969 Israel	Mixed Doubles

Jack Saul is a South African-Israeli former professional tennis player. He competed at the Wimbledon Championships and US Open, and won silver medals in men's singles and mixed doubles at the 1969 Maccabiah Games.

== Biography ==
Saul, originally from Durban where he attended Northlands High School, competed on the international tour in the 1960s and 1970s. He made it through to the third round of the 1966 Wimbledon Championships, winning both his matches in the fifth set, over Osamu Ishiguro of Japan (12–10) and Ismail El Shafei of Egypt (7–5).

A 1969 Maccabiah Games competitor in Israel for South Africa, Saul finished second with a silver medal to American Davis Cup player Allen Fox in the singles. In the mixed doubles, he and South African Esmé Emmanuel came away with silver medals, after being defeated in the mixed doubles finals by American Julie Heldman, who was ranked # 2 in the US, and Ed Rubinoff.

He emigrated to Israel, coached at the Dan Accadia Tennis Club, and is a former Israeli national coach.
