= Geoff Bluett =

British tennis player

- Full name: Geoffrey Bluett
- Country (sports): Great Britain
- Born: 20 May 1941 (age 83)

Singles

Grand Slam singles results
- Wimbledon: 2R (1965, 1968)

Doubles

Grand Slam doubles results
- Wimbledon: 3R (1965)

Grand Slam mixed doubles results
- Wimbledon: 2R (1965, 1968)

Geoffrey Bluett (born 20 May 1941) is a British former tennis player.

Active on tour during the 1960s, Bluett won the South of England Championships in 1964 and qualified for four singles main draws at Wimbledon. His Wimbledon appearances included a first round win over Nicola Pietrangeli in 1968.

Bluett, a Middlesex county player, was a sports outfitter by profession.
