= Keith Wooldridge =

English tennis player

- Country (sports): United Kingdom
- Born: 24 October 1943 (age 83) Stoke-on-Trent, England
- Plays: Right-handed

Singles
- Career record: 277-171
- Career titles: 12

Grand Slam singles results
- Australian Open: 3R (1963)
- French Open: 1R (1965, 1969, 1970)
- Wimbledon: 3R (1964, 1966)
- US Open: 1R (1964)

Keith Wooldridge (born 24 October 1943) is a former professional tennis player from the United Kingdom who was active in the 1960s. He was born in Stoke-on-Trent, England.

His best singles result at a Grand Slam tournament was reaching the third round at Wimbledon in 1964 and 1966. He also reached the third round at the Australian Championships in 1963, but this was due to two walkovers in the first rounds.

Wooldridge won the Surrey Championships on grass in 1966 defeating Peter Curtis in the final and the same tournament again in 1968 defeating Ken Fletcher in the final.

After his active playing career, he was employed by the LTA as a development coach for female players from 1995 until his retirement in 2005.

== Personal life ==
He married Scottish tennis player Winnie Shaw in 1972.
