= Alan Mills (tennis) =

English tennis player and referee (1935–2024)

Alan Mills CBE
- Full name: Alan Ronald Mills
- Country (sports): Great Britain
- Born: 6 November 1935; Stretford, Lancashire, England
- Died: 18 January 2024 (aged 88)
- Plays: Right-handed

Singles
- Career record: 324–178
- Career titles: 31

Grand Slam singles results
- French Open: 3R (1959, 1962)
- Wimbledon: 4R (1959, 1962)
- US Open: 2R (1963)
- Professional majors
- Wembley Pro: QF (1967)

Doubles

Grand Slam doubles results
- Wimbledon: SF (1966)

Mixed doubles

Grand Slam mixed doubles results
- Wimbledon: QF (1957)

Team competitions
- Davis Cup: SF^{Eu} (1959, 1961, 1964)

Alan Ronald Mills CBE (6 November 1935 – 18 January 2024) was an English tennis player and tournament referee for the Wimbledon tennis championships from 1983 to 2005. Although each individual tennis match was controlled by an on-court umpire, Alan Mills ran the entire tournament. However, perhaps he was most well known because the decision to stop play in the event of rain was that of Mills, and so his face was familiar to millions of television viewers worldwide, in the corner of Centre Court, clutching his two-way radio and glancing upwards at the sky in search of rainclouds.

== Tennis career ==
Mills was himself an accomplished tennis player. At the age of 17 he was the senior county champion in his home county of Lancashire, and he reached the last 16 in the men's singles at Wimbledon on two occasions. Partnering compatriot Mark Cox he reached the semifinals of the 1966 Wimbledon doubles event. Mills was also the first man in the history of the Davis Cup to win a match with the scoreline 6–0, 6–0, 6–0, completing the match against Joseph Offenheim in just 32 minutes.

Mills was the first Englishman to defeat Rod Laver in 1961 at the London Hard Court Championships when the Australian came to Britain.

In 1965, he won the Dutch Covered Courts Championships, defeating Roger Taylor in the semifinal and Bobby Wilson in the final.

The following year he became a professional tennis coach and played matches on the professional tour.

Mills was appointed Officer of the Order of the British Empire (OBE) in the 1996 Birthday Honours for services to lawn tennis, and promoted to Commander of the Order of the British Empire (CBE) in the 2006 New Year Honours for services to sport.

== Personal life and death ==
Mills married English table tennis international Jill Rook in 1960. He died on 18 January 2024, at the age of 88.
