= Ronald Barnes (tennis) =

Brazilian tennis player (1941–2002)

- Full name: Ronald Winston Barnes
- Country (sports): Brazil
- Born: 1 January 1941 Rio de Janeiro, Brazil
- Died: 13 December 2002 (aged 61) New York City, New York
- Turned pro: 1957 (amateur tour)
- Retired: 1970

Singles

Grand Slam singles results
- French Open: QF (1964)
- Wimbledon: 3R (1958, 1963, 1966)
- US Open: SF (1963)

Ronald Winston Barnes (1 January 1941 – 13 December 2002) was a professional tennis player from Brazil who competed in the 1950s and 1960s.

Barnes reached the semifinals of the U.S. National Championships in 1963, beating third seed Dennis Ralston in the quarter finals. Afterwards Ralston said "I used to think clay was Barnes' best surface, but now I've got to call him a grass player. If he continues to play like that, I don't know who'll beat him". Barnes won many points with forehands from the baseline, but also came into the net and scored with many backhand volleys. However, Barnes lost in the semi finals to Frank Froehling. He also reached the quarterfinals of the event in 1967 and the quarterfinals of Roland Garros in 1964.
