= Bill Hoogs Jr. =

American tennis player

Bill Hoogs
- Full name: William Henry Hoogs IV
- Country (sports): United States
- Born: November 3, 1940 San Francisco, California
- Died: April 30, 1978 (aged 37) Berkeley, California

Singles
- Career record: 325–175
- Career titles: 8

Grand Slam singles results
- French Open: 4R (1965)
- Wimbledon: 2R (1963, 1966)
- US Open: 3R (1961)

William Henry Hoogs IV (November 3, 1940 – April 30, 1978), known as Bill Hoogs Jr., was an American tennis player from San Francisco. He was active from 1956 to 1967 and contested 16 career finals winning eight singles titles.

== Career ==
Hoogs played his first event at the Pacific North West Tournament in 1956. In 1959 he won his first singles title at the British Columbia Championships played at the Victoria Lawn Tennis Club, Victoria, British Columbia, Canada. He formed a strong doubles combination at UC Berkeley with Jim McManus. The pair were doubles runners-up at the 1961 NCAA Championships. They were also runners-up in doubles to Allen Fox and Larry Nagler at the Ojai Tennis Tournament in 1961.

Together with McManus, Hoogs won doubles titles at the 1961 National Hard Court Championships and the Canadian Open in 1962. In 1966 he won singles title at the Wolverhampton Open at Newbridge, Wolverhampton in England against New Zealander Onny Parun. The same year he won his final singles title at the Ulster Grass Court Championships in Belfast, Northern Ireland.

As a singles player, Hoogs notably reached the fourth round at the 1965 French Championships and only narrowly missed out on a spot in the quarter-finals, losing to Toomas Leius 7–9 in the fifth set. He played his final tournament at the 1967 Wimbledon Championships.

His other career singles title wins included; the British Columbia Championships (1959), the Hawkeye Championships (1961), the Mill Valley Invitation (1963), the St. Moritz International (1966), Kulm Carlton (1966), and the Israel Autumn International Invitation (1966). He was also a finalist at the Oregon State Championships (1959), San Joaquin Challenge Cup (1961), U.S. Hard Courts (1961), Central California Championships (1961), Salinas Open (1964), Guildford Hard Courts (1966), Kampala (1966) and the Roehampton Grass Courts (1966).

== Death ==
Hoogs had his leg amputated in 1968, after developing a malignant growth on his foot. He died of cancer in 1978.
