= Premjit Lall =

Indian tennis player

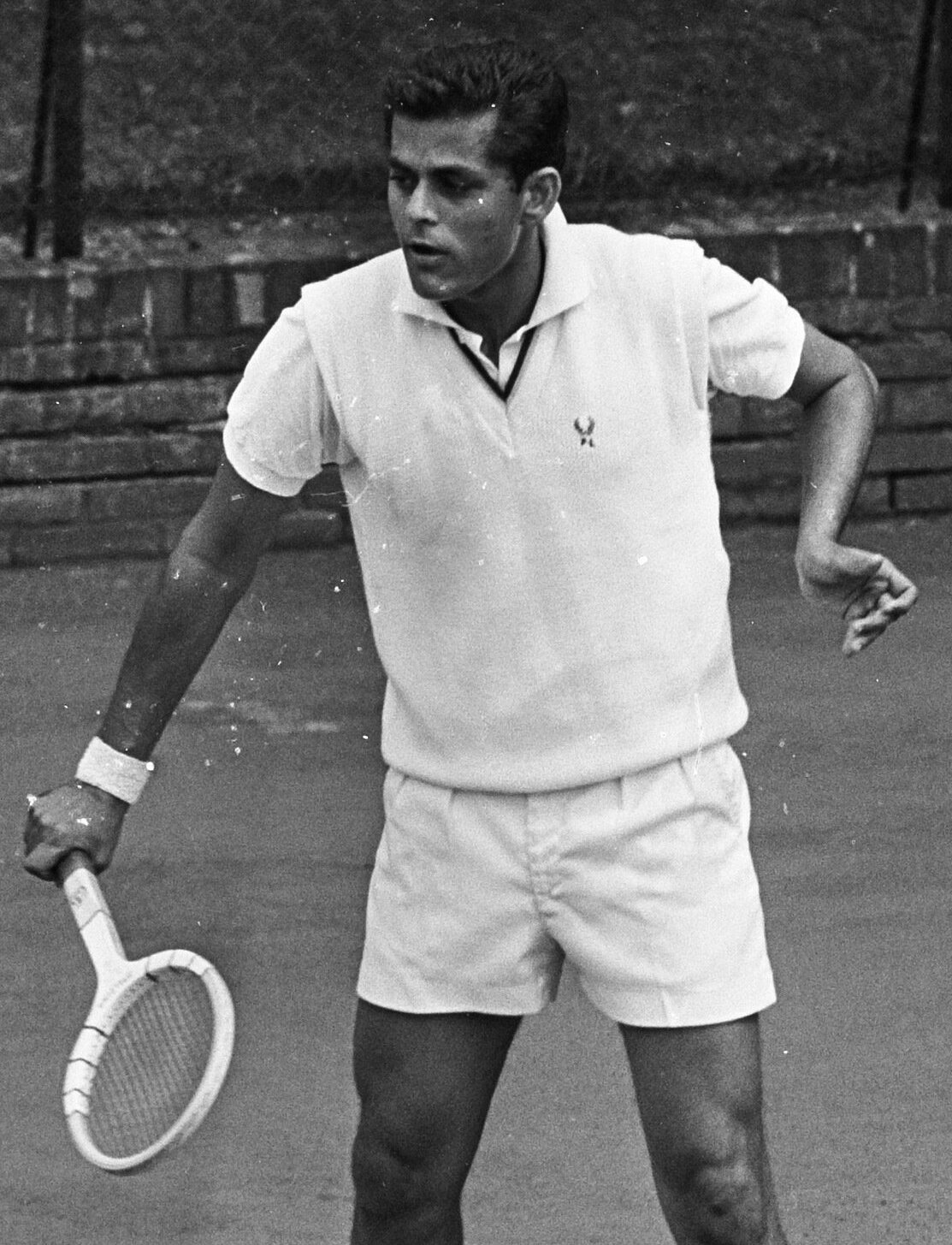
- Full name: Premjit J. Lall
- Country (sports): India
- Born: 20 October 1940 Calcutta, Bengal Presidency, British India
- Died: 31 December 2008 (aged 68) Kolkata, West Bengal, India
- Retired: 1979
- Plays: Right-handed (one-handed backhand)

Singles
- Career record: 294–231 (56%)
- Career titles: 9

Grand Slam singles results
- Australian Open: 3R (1962)
- French Open: 3R (1969)
- Wimbledon: 3R (1962, 1965, 1970)
- US Open: 2R (1959, 1964, 1969, 1970)

Doubles
- Career record: 20–36

Grand Slam doubles results
- Australian Open: QF (1962)
- Wimbledon: QF (1966, 1973)

Grand Slam mixed doubles results
- Wimbledon: 2R (1958, 1959)

Team competitions
- Davis Cup: F (1959, 1962, 1963, 1966^{Ch}, 1968)

Premjit Lall (20 October 1940 – 31 December 2008) was an Indian professional tennis player from Kolkata, who was active during the 1960s and 70s.

== Tennis career ==
Lall started his tennis career on the grass courts of the Calcutta South Club where he was coached by Dilip Bose. Together with Jaidip Mukerjea and Ramanathan Krishnan they were called the Three Musketeers of Indian tennis.

Lall was a runner-up at the Boys Singles event at the 1958 Wimbledon Championships, losing the final to Butch Buchholz. At the 1969 Wimbledon Championships Lall nearly caused a significant upset when he was leading first-seeded and world No. 1 Rod Laver by two sets to love in the second round but ultimately lost in five sets to Laver, who went on to win the title and his second Grand Slam. Lall competed in 18 editions of the Wimbledon Championships between 1957 and 1975. In 1973 he won the Stourbridge Open at Stourbridge, England against French player Daniel Contet.

He played on the Indian Davis Cup team from 1959 until 1973, competing in 41 ties and compiling a record of 52 wins and 32 losses. He was part of the team that reached the challenge round in 1966 against Australia but did not play in the challenge round.

In doubles, he reached the quarterfinals at the 1962 Australian Championships and the 1966 and 1973 Wimbledon Championships, all with compatriot Jaidip Mukerjea.

Lall won the singles title at the Indian International Championships in 1961 and 1970 defeating Carlos Fernandes and Alex Metreveli in the respective finals.

But Lall is most famous for the fact that, in the second round at Wimbledon in 1969, he led the great Rod Laver two sets to love, causing a sensation, before losing to Laver in five sets, after which, Laver went on to win that Wimbledon and, in 1969, his second calendar-year Grand Slam of tennis, having won it before in 1962.

Lall was given India's top sports honor, the Arjuna Award in 1967. Lall played his final professional match in 1979.

== Personal life ==
Lall was married twice and had two sons and one daughter. Following a stroke in 1992, Lall began using a wheelchair and had difficulty speaking. He died at his residence in Kolkata on 31 December 2008 after a prolonged illness, and was cremated at Tollygunge. In 2016, an invitation tournament named after him, was held in Kolkata in his memory.
