= Jim Moore (tennis) =

Australian tennis player

- Country (sports): Australia
- Born: 20 May 1938 (age 88)
- Plays: Right-handed

Grand Slam singles results
- Australian Open: 2R (1959)
- French Open: 1R (1966, 1968)
- Wimbledon: 1R (1965, 1966)

Jim Moore (born 20 May 1938) is an Australian former professional tennis player.

Moore, a Queenslander, made his main draw debut at the Australian Championships in 1959 and made several appearances at the French Championships and Wimbledon from the late 1960s. In addition to tennis he also competed in international tournaments as a squash player. He married tennis player Fay Toyne.
