= Ken Fletcher =

Australian tennis player (1940–2006)

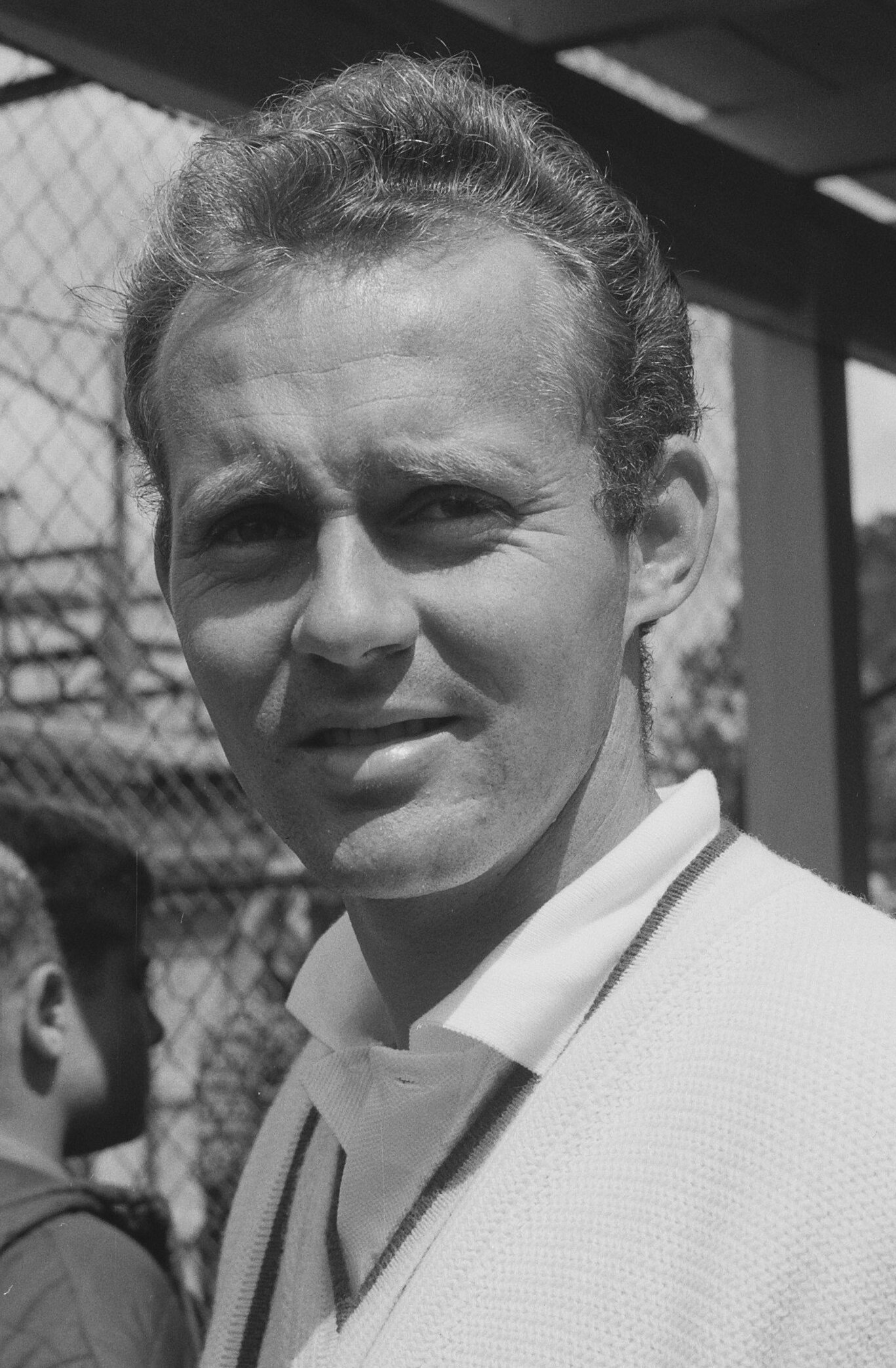
- Fletcher in 1965
- Full name: Kenneth Norman Fletcher
- Country (sports): Australia
- Born: 15 June 1940 Brisbane, Queensland, Australia
- Died: 11 February 2006 (aged 65) Brisbane, Queensland, Australia
- Turned pro: 1968 (amateur from 1958)
- Retired: 1973
- Plays: Right-handed (1-handed backhand)

Singles
- Career record: 55–31
- Highest ranking: No. 10 (1966, Lance Tingay)

Grand Slam singles results
- Australian Open: F (1963)
- French Open: QF (1963, 1966)
- Wimbledon: QF (1962, 1966, 1967)
- US Open: 3R (1963)

Doubles
- Highest ranking: No. 1 (1964)

Grand Slam doubles results
- Australian Open: F (1963, 1964)
- French Open: W (1964)
- Wimbledon: W (1966)

Grand Slam mixed doubles results
- Australian Open: W (1963, 1964)
- French Open: W (1963, 1964, 1965)
- Wimbledon: W (1963, 1965, 1966, 1968)
- US Open: W (1963)
- Last updated on: 14 September 2012.

Kenneth Norman Fletcher (15 June 1940 – 11 February 2006) was an Australian tennis player who won numerous doubles and mixed doubles Grand Slam titles.

== Biography ==
He was born in Brisbane, Queensland, Australia to parents Norm and Ethel Fletcher. He was educated at St Laurence's College and showed early promise as a championship tennis player there.

Fletcher won the 1963 Kent Championships on grass at Beckenham, defeating Owen Davidson in the semifinal and Martin Mulligan in the final.

Fletcher won the 1966 British Hard Court Championships at Bournemouth on clay, defeating Tom Okker in the final.

Also in 1966, he defeated John Newcombe at Wimbledon in the third round in five sets, but lost the quarterfinal to eventual champion Manuel Santana also in five sets.

His greatest success as a tennis player came in 1963, when he became the only man to win a calendar year Grand Slam in mixed doubles, partnering fellow Australian Margaret Court. He reached the final of the Australian Open in 1963, losing to Roy Emerson.

After this achievement, he went on to record mixed doubles championships in the Australian Open in 1964, French Open in 1964 and 1965, and Wimbledon in 1965, 1966, and 1968. All of his mixed doubles Grand Slam titles were in partnership with Smith Court.

He also achieved a Grand Slam title in men's doubles in the 1964 French Open, playing with Emerson. At the Wimbledon men's doubles championship, he was a finalist with Robert Hewitt in 1965, the champion in 1966 partnering John Newcombe, and a finalist again in 1967 with Emerson. In total, Fletcher won 27 international tennis titles. He was ranked World No. 10 in 1966 by Lance Tingay of The Daily Telegraph.

Ken was a larrikin by nature, and many of his exploits feature in Hugh Lunn's books, especially Over the Top with Jim and Head Over Heels. In later years, he was instrumental in gaining significant funding for medical research in Australia, through his association with Chuck Feeney. In 2008, Hugh Lunn published The Great Fletch, a book on Ken's life around the globe.

Fletcher died of cancer at the age of 65 and was buried at the Mount Gravatt Lawn Cemetery, Brisbane.

In January 2012, Ken Fletcher was inducted into the Australian Tennis Hall of Fame.

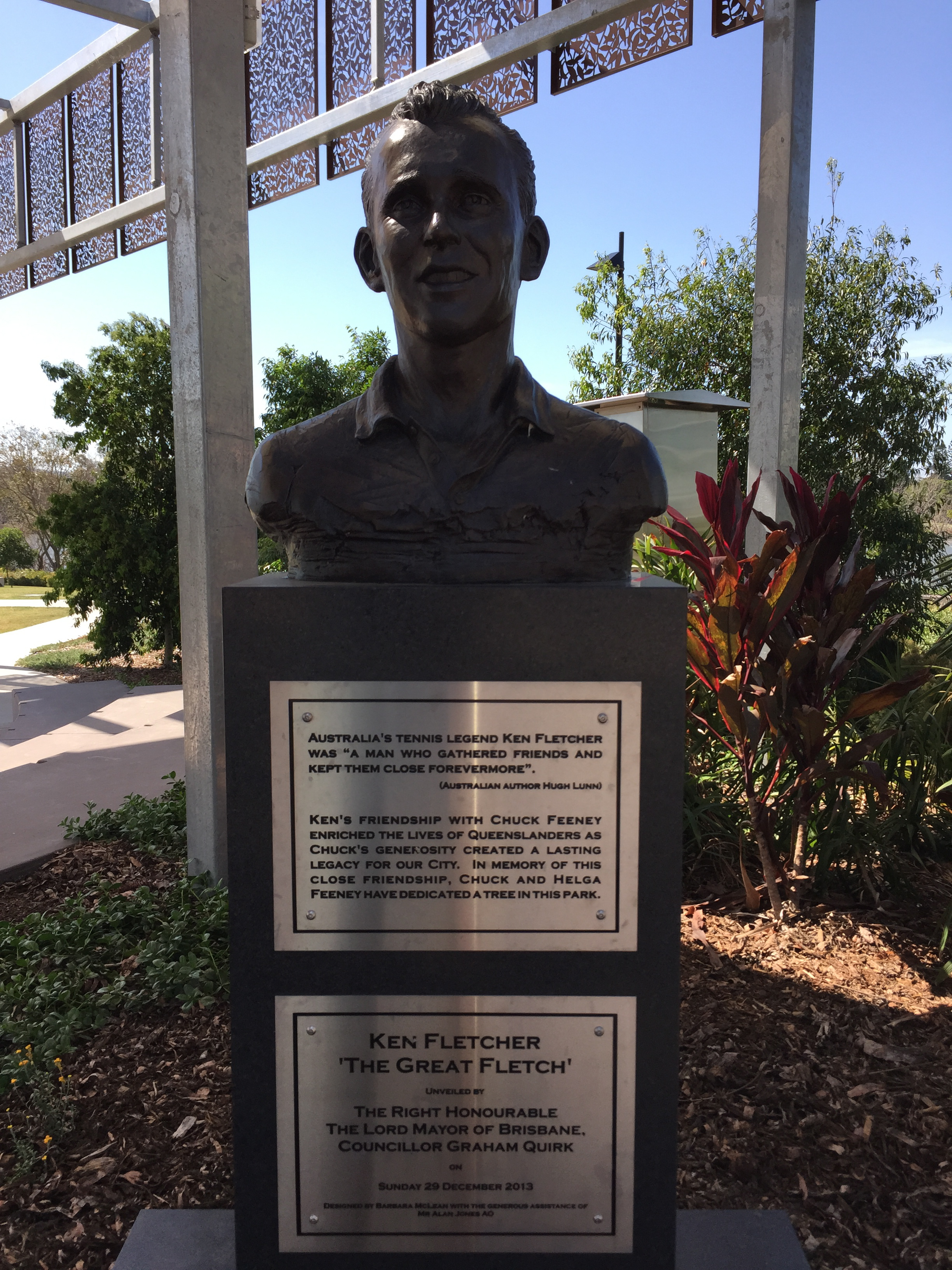
Ken Fletcher Memorial, Tennyson

In 2013, the Ken Fletcher memorial was erected in the park, outside the Queensland Tennis Centre, named in his honour. He is the only player in the history of tennis, to win a grand slam, in mixed doubles in 1963, that is not enshrined in the International Tennis Hall of Fame.

== Grand Slam finals ==
=== Singles: 1 (1 runner-up) ===
Result	Year	Championship	Surface	Opponent	Score
Loss	1963	Australian Championships	Grass	(Australia) Roy Emerson	3–6, 3–6, 1–6

=== Doubles: 9 (2 titles, 7 runners-up) ===
Result	Year	Championship	Surface	Partner	Opponents	Score
Loss	1963	Australian Championships	Grass	(Australia) John Newcombe	(South Africa) Bob Hewitt (Australia) Fred Stolle	2–6, 6–3, 3–6, 6–3, 3–6
Loss	1964	Australian Championships	Grass	(Australia) Roy Emerson	(South Africa) Bob Hewitt (Australia) Fred Stolle	4–6, 5–7, 6–3, 6–4, 12–14
Win	1964	French Championships	Clay	(Australia) Roy Emerson	(Australia) John Newcombe (Australia) Tony Roche	6–3, 6–4
Loss	1964	Wimbledon	Grass	(Australia) Roy Emerson	(South Africa) Bob Hewitt (Australia) Fred Stolle	5–7, 9–11, 4–6
Loss	1965	French Championships	Clay	(South Africa) Bob Hewitt	(Australia) Roy Emerson (Australia) Fred Stolle	8–6, 3–6, 6–8, 2–6
Loss	1965	Wimbledon	Grass	(South Africa) Bob Hewitt	(Australia) John Newcombe (Australia) Tony Roche	5–7, 3–6, 4–6
Win	1966	Wimbledon	Grass	(Australia) John Newcombe	(Australia) William Bowrey (Australia) Owen Davidson	6–3, 6–4, 3–6, 6–3
Loss	1967	French Championships	Clay	(Australia) Roy Emerson	(Australia) John Newcombe (Australia) Tony Roche	3–6, 7–9, 10–12
Loss	1967	Wimbledon	Grass	(Australia) Roy Emerson	(South Africa) Bob Hewitt (Australia) Frew McMillan	2–6, 3–6, 4–6

=== Mixed doubles: 11 (10 titles, 1 runner-up) ===
Result	Year	Championship	Surface	Partner	Opponents	Score
Win	1963	Australian Championships	Grass	(Australia) Margaret Smith	(Australia) Fred Stolle (Australia) Lesley Turner	6–4, 6–4
Win	1963	French Championships	Clay	(Australia) Margaret Smith	(Australia) Fred Stolle (Australia) Lesley Turner	6–1, 6–2
Win	1963	Wimbledon	Grass	(Australia) Margaret Smith	(South Africa) Bob Hewitt (United States) Darlene Hard	11–9, 6–4
Win	1963	US Championships (3)	Grass	(Australia) Margaret Smith	(United States) Ed Rubinoff (United States) Judy Tegart	0–6, 6–4, 6–4
Win	1964	Australian Championships (2)	Grass	(Australia) Margaret Smith	(United Kingdom) Mike Sangster (Australia) Jan Lehane	6–4, 6–4
Win	1964	French Championships (2)	Clay	(Australia) Margaret Smith	(Australia) Fred Stolle (Australia) Lesley Turner	6–3, 4–6, 8–6
Loss	1964	Wimbledon	Grass	(Australia) Margaret Smith	(Australia) Fred Stolle (Australia) Lesley Turner	6–4, 6–4
Win	1965	French Championships (3)	Clay	(Australia) Margaret Smith Court	(Australia) John Newcombe (Brazil) Maria Bueno	6–4, 6–4
Win	1965	Wimbledon (2)	Grass	(Australia) Margaret Court	(Australia) Tony Roche (Australia) Judy Tegart	12–10, 6–3
Win	1966	Wimbledon (3)	Grass	(Australia) Margaret Court	(United States) Dennis Ralston (United States) Billie Jean King	4–6, 6–3, 6–3
↓ Open Era ↓
Win	1968	Wimbledon (4)	Grass	(Australia) Margaret Court	(Soviet Union) Alex Metreveli (Soviet Union) Olga Morozova	6–1, 14–12
