= Owen Davidson =

Australian tennis player (1943–2023)

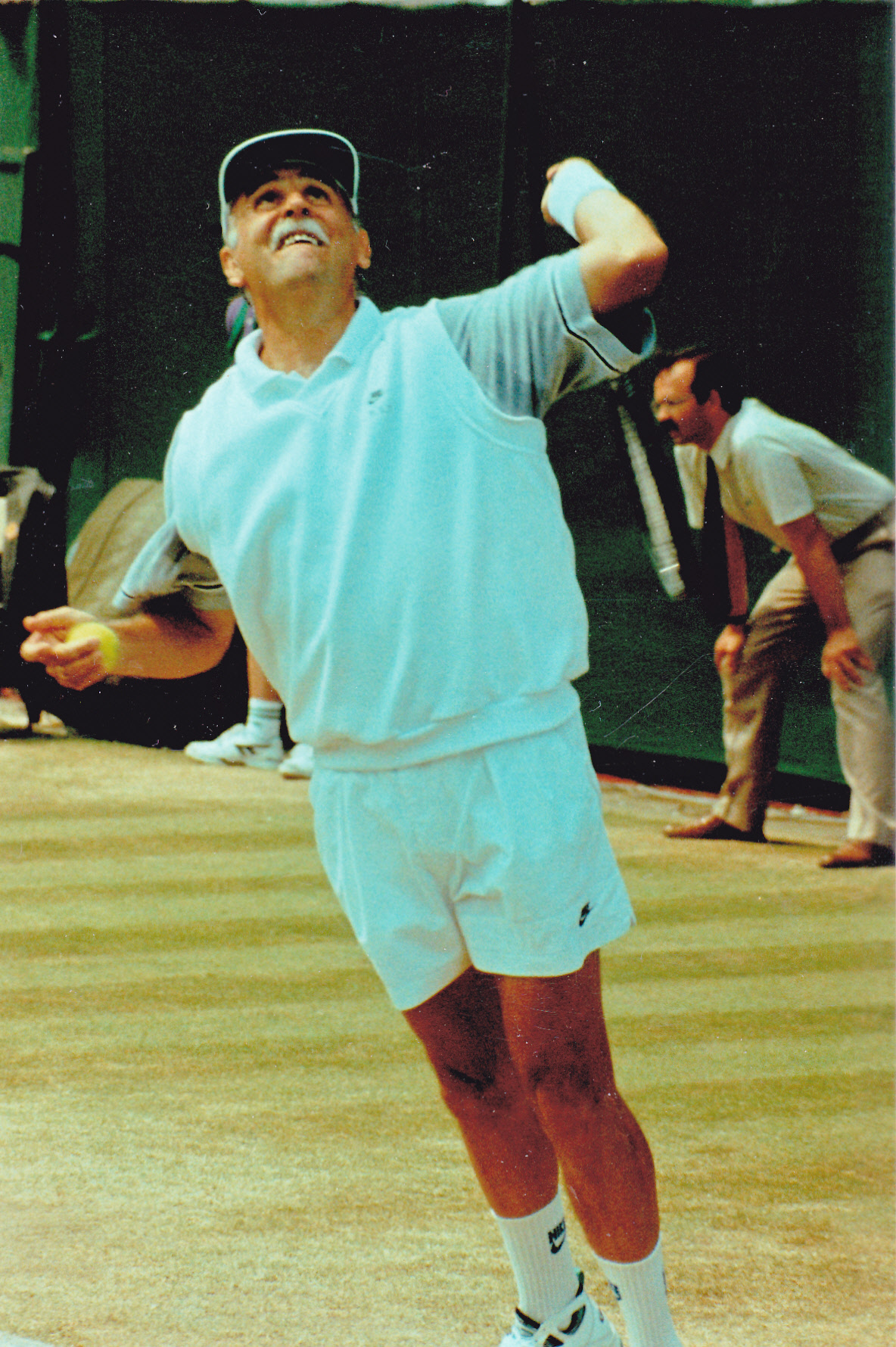
- Davidson in 1988
- Country (sports): Australia
- Born: 4 October 1943 Melbourne, Victoria, Australia
- Died: 12 May 2023 (aged 79) Conroe, Texas, U.S.
- Height: 1.85 m (6 ft 1 in)
- Turned pro: 1969 (amateur from 1962)
- Retired: 1974
- Plays: Left-handed (one-handed backhand)
- Int. Tennis HoF: 2010 (member page)

Singles
- Career record: 80–107
- Highest ranking: No. 8 (1967, The New York Times)

Grand Slam singles results
- Australian Open: QF (1962, 1963, 1964, 1965, 1967)
- French Open: QF (1967)
- Wimbledon: SF (1966)
- US Open: QF (1966, 1967)

Other tournaments
- Professional majors
- US Pro: SF (1967)

Doubles
- Career record: 127–65
- Career titles: 10

Grand Slam doubles results
- Australian Open: W (1972)
- French Open: 3R (1968)
- Wimbledon: F (1966)
- US Open: W (1973)

Grand Slam mixed doubles results
- Australian Open: W (1965, 1967)
- French Open: W (1967)
- Wimbledon: W (1967, 1971, 1973, 1974)
- US Open: W (1966, 1967, 1971, 1973)

Owen Keir Davidson (4 October 1943 – 12 May 2023) was an Australian professional tennis player of the 1960s and 1970s.

Alongside Billie Jean King, Davidson won eight grand slam mixed doubles titles. In 1967 he won a calendar year slam for mixed doubles, when he won the Australian Championships (with Lesley Turner Bowrey), and the French Championships, Wimbledon and the US Championships (with King).

Davidson became the first player to win a match in the open era of tennis when he defeated John Clifton in the first round of the British Hard Court Championships in Bournemouth played in April 1968.

His best grand slam singles result was at Wimbledon in 1966, when he reached the semifinals (beating top seed Roy Emerson before losing to Manuel Santana). He was also the 1972 Australian Open and the 1973 US Open men's doubles champion, partnering John Newcombe and Ken Rosewall respectively. He was inducted into the International Tennis Hall of Fame in Newport, Rhode Island in 2010. He was inducted into the Australian Tennis Hall of Fame at the Rod Laver Arena in Melbourne on 26 January 2011 (Australia Day).

Davidson died in Conroe, Texas, on 12 May 2023, at the age of 79.

== Grand Slam finals ==
=== Doubles: 6 (2–4) ===
Result	Year	Championship	Surface	Partner	Opponents	Score
Loss	1966	Wimbledon	Grass	(Australia) Bill Bowrey	(Australia) Ken Fletcher (Australia) John Newcombe	3–6, 4–6, 6–3, 3–6
Loss	1967	Australian Championships	Grass	(Australia) Bill Bowrey	(Australia) John Newcombe (Australia) Tony Roche	6–3, 3–6, 5–7, 8–6, 6–8
Loss	1967	US Championships	Grass	(Australia) Bill Bowrey	(Australia) John Newcombe (Australia) Tony Roche	8–6, 7–9, 3–6, 3–6
Win	1972	Australian Open	Grass	(Australia) Ken Rosewall	(Australia) Ross Case (Australia) Geoff Masters	3–6, 7–6, 6–3
Loss	1972	US Open	Grass	(Australia) John Newcombe	(South Africa) Cliff Drysdale (United Kingdom) Roger Taylor	4–6, 6–7, 3–6
Win	1973	US Open	Grass	(Australia) John Newcombe	(Australia) Rod Laver (Australia) Ken Rosewall	7–5, 2–6, 7–5, 7–5

=== Mixed doubles: 12 (11–1) ===
Result	Year	Championship	Surface	Partner	Opponents	Score
Win	1965	Australian Championships	Grass	(Australia) Robyn Ebbern	(Australia) Margaret Smith (Australia) John Newcombe	shared, final not played
Win	1966	US Championships	Grass	(United States) Donna Floyd Fales	(United States) Carol Hanks Aucamp (United States) Ed Rubinoff	6–1, 6–3
Win	1967	Australian Championships (2)	Grass	(Australia) Lesley Turner Bowrey	(Australia) Judy Tegart-Dalton (Australia) Tony Roche	9–7, 6–4
Win	1967	French Championships	Clay	(United States) Billie Jean King	(United Kingdom) Ann Haydon-Jones (Romania) Ion Țiriac	6–3, 6–1
Win	1967	Wimbledon	Grass	(United States) Billie Jean King	(Brazil) Maria Bueno (Australia) Ken Fletcher	7–5, 6–2
Win	1967	US Championships (2)	Grass	(United States) Billie Jean King	(United States) Rosemary Casals (United States) Stan Smith	6–3, 6–2
Loss	1968	French Open	Clay	(United States) Billie Jean King	(France) Françoise Dürr (France) Jean-Claude Barclay	1–6, 4–6
Win	1971	Wimbledon (2)	Grass	(United States) Billie Jean King	(Australia) Margaret Court (United States) Marty Riessen	3–6, 6–2, 15–13
Win	1971	US Open (3)	Grass	(United States) Billie Jean King	(South Africa) Bob Maud (Netherlands) Betty Stöve	6–3, 7–5
Win	1973	Wimbledon (3)	Grass	(United States) Billie Jean King	(United States) Janet Newberry (Mexico) Raúl Ramírez	6–3, 6–2
Win	1973	US Open (4)	Grass	(United States) Billie Jean King	(Australia) Margaret Court (United States) Marty Riessen	6–3, 3–6, 7–6
Win	1974	Wimbledon (4)	Grass	(United States) Billie Jean King	(United Kingdom) Lesley Charles (United Kingdom) Mark Farrell	6–3, 9–7

== Open Era career finals ==
=== Doubles: 21 (10 wins / 11 losses) ===
Result	W/L	Date	Tournament	Surface	Partner	Opponents	Score
Win	1–0	Apr 1969	Monte-Carlo, Monaco	Clay	(Australia) John Newcombe	(United States) Pancho Gonzales (United States) Dennis Ralston	7–5, 11–13, 6–2, 6–1
Win	2–0	Jun 1969	London/Queen's Club, UK	Grass	(United States) Dennis Ralston	(Brazil) Thomaz Koch (Sweden) Ove Nils Bengtson	8–6, 6–3
Loss	2–1	Apr 1970	Rome, Italy	Clay	(Australia) Bill Bowrey	(Romania) Ilie Năstase (Romania) Ion Țiriac	6–0, 8–10, 3–6, 8–6, 1–6
Win	3–1	Aug 1970	Hilversum, Netherlands	Hard	(Australia) Bill Bowrey	(Australia) John Alexander (Australia) Phil Dent	6–3, 6–4, 6–2
Loss	3–2	Nov 1970	Stockholm, Sweden	Hard (i)	(Australia) Bob Carmichael	(United States) Arthur Ashe (United States) Stan Smith	0–6, 7–5, 5–7
Win	4–2	May 1971	Bournemouth, UK	Clay	(Australia) Bill Bowrey	(Chile) Patricio Cornejo (Chile) Jaime Fillol	8–6, 6–2, 3–6, 4–6, 6–3
Loss	4–3	Oct 1971	Wembley, UK	Carpet	(Australia) Bill Bowrey	(South Africa) Bob Hewitt (South Africa) Frew McMillan	5–7, 7–9, 2–6
Win	5–3	Jan 1972	Australian Open, Melbourne	Grass	(Australia) Ken Rosewall	(Australia) Ross Case (Australia) Geoff Masters	3–6, 7–6, 6–3
Loss	5–4	Sep 1972	US Open, New York	Grass	(Australia) John Newcombe	(South Africa) Cliff Drysdale (United Kingdom) Roger Taylor	4–6, 6–7, 4–6
Loss	5–5	Aug 1973	Montreal, Canada	Hard	(Australia) John Newcombe	(Australia) Rod Laver (Australia) Ken Rosewall	5–7, 6–7
Win	6–5	Sep 1973	US Open, New York	Grass	(Australia) John Newcombe	(Australia) Roy Emerson (Australia) Rod Laver	7–5, 2–6, 7–5, 7–5
Win	7–5	Sep 1973	Chicago, US	Carpet	(Australia) John Newcombe	(United Kingdom) Gerald Battrick (United Kingdom) Graham Stilwell	6–7, 7–6, 7–6
Loss	7–6	Oct 1973	Fort Worth, US	Hard	(Australia) John Newcombe	(United States) Brian Gottfried (United States) Dick Stockton	6–7, 4–6
Win	8–6	Nov 1973	London	Carpet	(United Kingdom) Mark Cox	(United Kingdom) Gerald Battrick (United Kingdom) Graham Stilwell	6–4, 8–6
Loss	8–7	Feb 1974	Baltimore, US	Carpet	(United States) Clark Graebner	(West Germany) Jürgen Fassbender (West Germany) Karl Meiler	6–7, 5–7
Win	9–7	Feb 1974	St. Petersburg WCT, US	Hard	(Australia) John Newcombe	(United States) Clark Graebner (United States) Charlie Pasarell	4–6, 6–3, 6–4
Loss	9–8	Apr 1974	New Orleans WCT, US		(Australia) John Newcombe	(United States) Robert Lutz (United States) Stan Smith	6–4, 4–6, 6–7
Win	10–8	Apr 1974	Orlando WCT, US	Clay	(Australia) John Newcombe	(United States) Brian Gottfried (United States) Dick Stockton	7–6, 6–3
Loss	10–9	Apr 1974	Charlotte, US	Clay	(Australia) John Newcombe	(United Kingdom) Buster Mottram (Mexico) Raúl Ramírez	3–6, 6–1, 3–6
Loss	10–10	May 1974	World Doubles, Montreal	Carpet	(Australia) John Newcombe	(South Africa) Bob Hewitt (South Africa) Frew McMillan	2–6, 7–6, 1–6, 2–6
Loss	10–11	Oct 1974	Maui, US	Hard	(Australia) John Newcombe	(United States) Dick Stockton (United States) Roscoe Tanner	3–6, 6–7

Source: ATP
