= Keith Diepraam =

South African tennis player

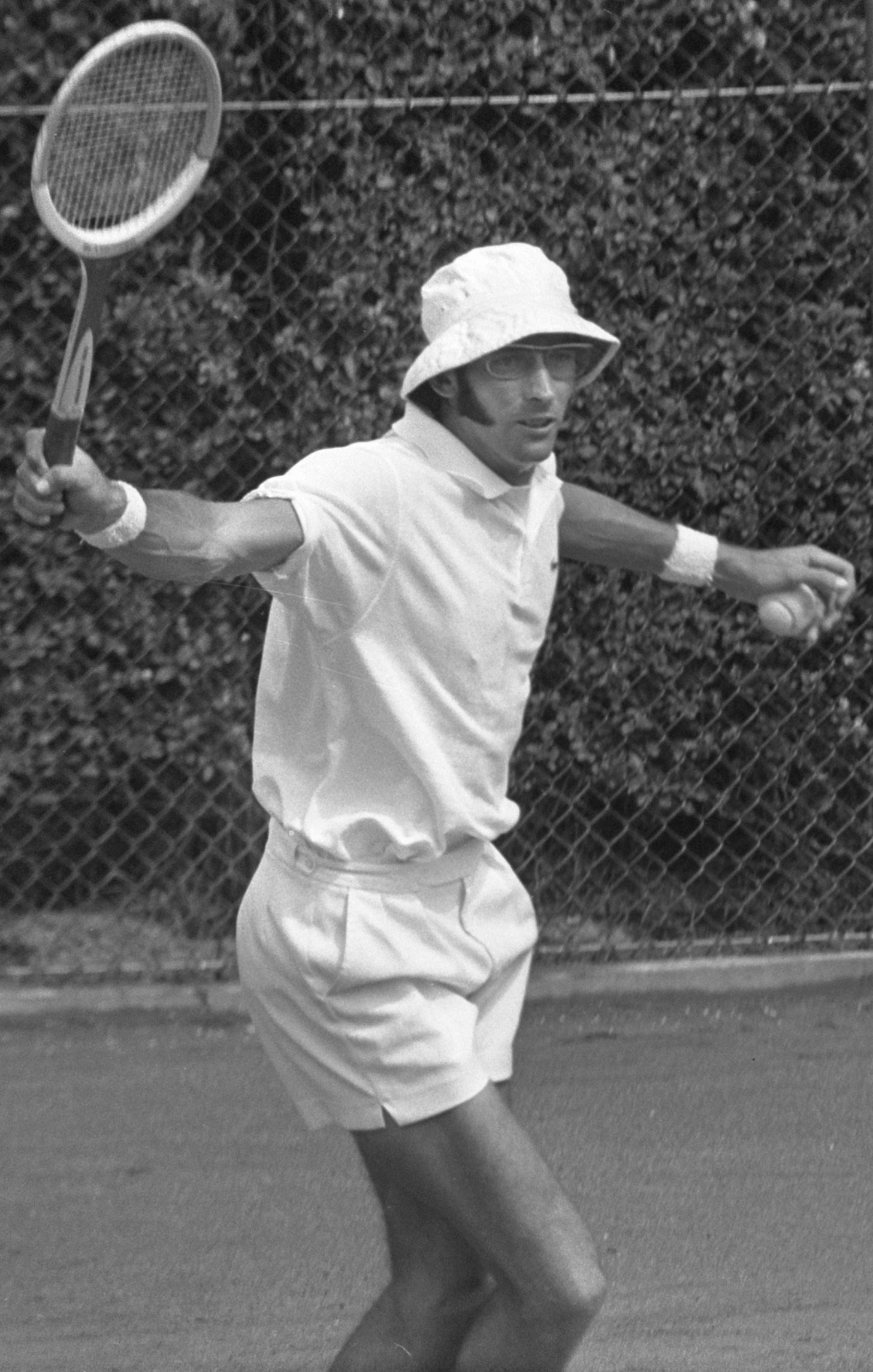
- Keith Diepraam (1970)
- Full name: Keith Edward Diepraam
- Country (sports): South Africa
- Born: 11 September 1942 (age 82); Johannesburg, South Africa
- Plays: Right-handed

Singles

Grand Slam singles results
- French Open: 3R (1966)
- Wimbledon: QF (1965)
- US Open: 1R (1964)

Doubles

Grand Slam doubles results
- French Open: 2R (1970)
- Wimbledon: QF (1965)

Grand Slam mixed doubles results
- Wimbledon: 3R (1963, 1970)

Keith Edward Diepraam (born 11 September 1942) is a retired South African male tennis player.

Diepraam started playing tennis at age 15 when he went to Glenwood High School in Durban, South Africa.

In 1964 he was runner–up to countryman Cliff Drysdale at the Stuttgart tournament.

Between 1964 and 1966 Diepraam played seven ties for the South African Davis Cup team and compiled a record of 20 wins and 12 losses. In 1965 and 1966 South Africa reached the final of the Europe zone but lost to Spain and West Germany respectively.

After his playing career he became a tennis coach and took a coaching position in Midland, Texas, USA in 1973. In 1990 he became the personal coach of Wayne Ferreira.

In 2009 he was inducted into the Texas Tennis Hall of Fame.
