= Daniel Contet =

French former tennis player (born 1943)

- Country (sports): France
- Born: 3 November 1943; Le Raincy, France
- Died: 23 November 2018 (aged 75)
- Plays: Right-handed

Singles
- Career record: 17–32
- Career titles: 0
- Highest ranking: No. 245 (3 June 1974)

Grand Slam singles results
- French Open: 3R (1963)
- Wimbledon: 3R (1967, 1968)
- US Open: 3R (1966)

Doubles
- Career record: 28–25
- Career titles: 1

Grand Slam doubles results
- French Open: SF (1974)
- Wimbledon: QF (1969)

Daniel Contet (3 November 1943 – 23 October 2018) was a French international tennis player. He competed in 16 ties for the French Davis Cup team between 1961 and 1969.

== Career finals ==
=== Doubles (1 title, 1 runner-up) ===
Result	W–L	Date	Tournament	Surface	Partner	Opponents	Score
Loss	0–1	April 1968	Monte Carlo, Monaco	Clay	(France) Patrice Beust	(Soviet Union) Sergei Likhachev (Soviet Union) Alex Metreveli	7–5, 7–9, 4–6, 7–5, 5–7
Win	1–1	Apr 1972	Monte-Carlo Masters, France	Carpet	(France) Patrice Beust	(Czechoslovakia) Jiří Hřebec (Czechoslovakia) František Pala	3–6, 6–1, 12–10, 6–2
