= 1962 Wimbledon Championships – Men's doubles =

Men's doubles
- 1962 Wimbledon Championships

Final
- Champions: (Australia) Bob Hewitt (Australia) Fred Stolle
- Runners-up: (Socialist Federal Republic of Yugoslavia) Boro Jovanović (Socialist Federal Republic of Yugoslavia) Nikola Pilić
- Score: 6–2, 5–7, 6–2, 6–4

Details
- Draw: 64 (5Q)
- Seeds: 4

Events
Singles	men	women		boys	girls
Doubles	men	women	mixed	boys	girls
- Wimbledon Championships

Roy Emerson and Neale Fraser were the defending champions, but lost in the semifinals to Boro Jovanović and Nikola Pilić.

Bob Hewitt and Fred Stolle defeated Jovanović and Pilić in the final, 6–2, 5–7, 6–2, 6–4 to win the gentlemen's doubles tennis title at the 1962 Wimbledon Championship.

== Seeds ==
1. (Australia) Roy Emerson / (Australia) Neale Fraser (semifinals)
2. (Australia) Bob Hewitt / (Australia) Fred Stolle (champions)
3. (Australia) John Fraser / (Australia) Rod Laver (semifinals)
4. (United States) Chuck McKinley / (United States) Dennis Ralston (quarterfinals)

Click on the seed number of a player to go to their draw section.

== Draw ==
Key

- Q = Qualifier
- WC = Wild card
- LL = Lucky loser
- Alt = Alternate
- ITF = ITF entry
- PR = Protected ranking
- SR = Special ranking
- SE = Special exempt
- JE = Junior exempt
- JR = Junior Accelerator Programme entrant
- CO = College Accelerator Programme entrant
- NG = Next Gen Accelerator Program entrant
- w/o = Walkover
- r = Retired
- d = Defaulted

=== Finals ===
Quarterfinals
1	(Australia) Roy Emerson (Australia) Neale Fraser	4	6	5	7	6
(United Kingdom) Alan Mills (United Kingdom) Bobby Wilson	6	3	7	5	4
4	(United States) Chuck McKinley (United States) Dennis Ralston	6	2	6	2
(Socialist Federal Republic of Yugoslavia) Boro Jovanović (Socialist Federal Republic of Yugoslavia) Nikola Pilić	4	6	8	6
(Mexico) Rafael Osuna (Mexico) Antonio Palafox	6	3	3	4
3	(Australia) John Fraser (Australia) Rod Laver	2	6	6	6
(United States) Donald Dell (United States) Jon Douglas	4	2	6	3
2	(Australia) Bob Hewitt (Australia) Fred Stolle	6	6	4	6

Semifinals
1	(Australia) Roy Emerson (Australia) Neale Fraser	6	3	4	4
(Socialist Federal Republic of Yugoslavia) Boro Jovanović (Socialist Federal Republic of Yugoslavia) Nikola Pilić	4	6	6	6
3	(Australia) John Fraser (Australia) Rod Laver	6	7	5	2
2	(Australia) Bob Hewitt (Australia) Fred Stolle	8	5	7	6

Final
(Socialist Federal Republic of Yugoslavia) Boro Jovanović (Socialist Federal Republic of Yugoslavia) Nikola Pilić	2	7	2	4
2	(Australia) Bob Hewitt (Australia) Fred Stolle	6	5	6	6

=== Top half ===
==== Section 1 ====
First round
1	(Australia) Roy Emerson (Australia) Neale Fraser	3	6	6	6
(Austria) Detlev Herdy (Austria) Ladislav Legenstein	6	1	2	2
(Australia) Tim Clayton (Australia) Owen Davidson	6	3	8	6	9
(India) Premjit Lall (India) Jaidip Mukerjea	3	6	10	3	11
(South Africa) Keith Diepraam (South Africa) Robin Sanders	6	6	6
(United States) Chris Crawford (United States) Frank Froehling	2	4	1
(Australia) Warren Jacques (Australia) Martin Mulligan	6	6	6
(Italy) Sergio Jacobini (Italy) Michele Pirro	2	0	2
(Norway) Thorvald Moe (United States) Paul Palmer	6	4	7	6	4
(France) Pierre Darmon (France) Jacques Renavand	8	6	5	3	6
(South Africa) Cliff Drysdale (Denmark) Jørgen Ulrich	3	6	4
(United Kingdom) Alan Mills (United Kingdom) Bobby Wilson	6	8	6
(United Kingdom) Peter Moys (United Kingdom) John Ward	6	6	6
(Ecuador) Miguel Olvera (Ecuador) Eduardo Zuleta	1	3	4
(West Germany) Wilhelm Bungert (West Germany) Christian Kuhnke	3	7	4	3
(Brazil) Ronnie Barnes (Brazil) Carlos Fernandes	6	5	6	6

Second round
1	(Australia) R Emerson (Australia) N Fraser	6	6	6
(India) P Lall (India) J Mukerjea	0	2	4
(South Africa) K Diepraam (South Africa) R Sanders	4	6	6	6
(Australia) W Jacques (Australia) M Mulligan	6	3	4	4
(France) P Darmon (France) J Renavand	6	3	4	2
(United Kingdom) A Mills (United Kingdom) R Wilson	3	6	6	6
(United Kingdom) P Moys (United Kingdom) J Ward	1	4	6
(Brazil) R Barnes (Brazil) C Fernandes	6	6	8

Third round
1	(Australia) R Emerson (Australia) N Fraser	6	3	6	6
(South Africa) K Diepraam (South Africa) R Sanders	3	6	4	3
(United Kingdom) A Mills (United Kingdom) R Wilson	6	6	9
(Brazil) R Barnes (Brazil) C Fernandes	1	4	7

Quarterfinals
1	(Australia) R Emerson (Australia) N Fraser	4	6	5	7	6
(United Kingdom) A Mills (United Kingdom) R Wilson	6	3	7	5	4

==== Section 2 ====
First round
4	(United States) Chuck McKinley (United States) Dennis Ralston	6	6	6
(Spain) Juan Manuel Couder (Spain) Juan Gisbert	2	4	2
(Belgium) Jacques Brichant (Belgium) Eric Drossart	4	6	9	6	4
Q	(Australia) Bill Bowrey (Australia) Geoff Knox	6	4	11	2	6
(Australia) Neville Holland (India) Narenda Nath	7	6	3	4
(Australia) Owen French (Australia) John Hillebrand	5	8	6	6
(Spain) Alberto Arilla (Argentina) Eduardo Soriano	7	6	5	6	7
(West Germany) Ingo Buding (Italy) Sergio Tacchini	5	3	7	8	5
(Poland) Wiesław Gąsiorek (Socialist Federal Republic of Yugoslavia) Sima Nikolić	6	3	7	4
Q	(United Kingdom) David Gunson (United Kingdom) Geoff Stubbs	4	6	9	6
(Hungary) István Gulyás (Mexico) Antonio Palafox	6	8	2	4	3
(United States) Crawford Henry (United States) Ned Neely	3	6	6	6	6
(Australia) Ken Fletcher (Australia) John Newcombe	6	10	3	1	3
(Australia) Bob Howe (India) Ramanathan Krishnan	4	8	6	6	6
Q	(Japan) Michio Fujii (Japan) Osamu Ishiguro	0	6	2	6
(Socialist Federal Republic of Yugoslavia) Boro Jovanović (Socialist Federal Republic of Yugoslavia) Nikola Pilić	6	4	6	8

Second round
4	(United States) C McKinley (United States) D Ralston	2	6	6	6
Q	(Australia) W Bowrey (Australia) G Knox	6	4	3	4
(Australia) O French (Australia) J Hillebrand	4	5	10
(Spain) A Arilla (Argentina) E Soriano	6	7	12
Q	(United Kingdom) D Gunson (United Kingdom) G Stubbs	1	2	7
(United States) C Henry (United States) E Neely	6	6	9
(Australia) R Howe (India) R Krishnan
(Socialist Federal Republic of Yugoslavia) B Jovanović (Socialist Federal Republic of Yugoslavia) N Pilić	w/o

Third round
4	(United States) C McKinley (United States) D Ralston	6	6	6
(Spain) A Arilla (Argentina) E Soriano	4	3	4
(United States) C Henry (United States) E Neely	8	1	6	6	3
(Socialist Federal Republic of Yugoslavia) B Jovanović (Socialist Federal Republic of Yugoslavia) N Pilić	6	6	3	8	6

Quarterfinals
4	(United States) C McKinley (United States) D Ralston	6	2	6	2
(Socialist Federal Republic of Yugoslavia) B Jovanović (Socialist Federal Republic of Yugoslavia) N Pilić	4	6	8	6

=== Bottom half ===
==== Section 3 ====
First round
(United States) Rudy Hernando (Australia) John Sharpe	3	2	5
(Spain) José Luis Arilla (Spain) Manuel Santana	6	6	7
(India) Naresh Kumar (Venezuela) Isaías Pimentel	7	3	6	6	4
(United States) Whitney Reed (United States) Gene Scott	9	6	3	4	6
(Mexico) Rafael Osuna (Mexico) Antonio Palafox	7	9	5	6	6
(Australia) Greg Hughes (Australia) Barry Phillips-Moore	9	7	7	1	2
(France) Jean Borotra (France) Paul Jalabert	4	2	4
(Brazil) Bob Falkenburg (United Kingdom) Geoffrey Paish	6	6	6
(West Germany) Dieter Ecklebe (West Germany) Harald Elschenbroich	2	6	2	6
(Mexico) Mario Llamas (Chile) Patricio Rodríguez	6	4	6	8
(South Africa) Gordon Forbes (South Africa) Abe Segal	11	6	10
(United Kingdom) John Barrett (United Kingdom) Michael Hann	9	3	8
(United Kingdom) Billy Knight (United Kingdom) Tony Pickard	8	6	10
(Soviet Union) Toomas Leius (Soviet Union) Sergei Likhachev	6	4	8
Q	(South Africa) Frew McMillan (South Africa) Francis Rawstorne	2	6	6	3
3	(Australia) John Fraser (Australia) Rod Laver	6	8	4	6

Second round
(Spain) JL Arilla (Spain) M Santana	10	6	7
(United States) W Reed (United States) E Scott	8	3	5
(Mexico) R Osuna (Mexico) A Palafox	6	6	6
(Brazil) R Falkenburg (United Kingdom) G Paish	4	1	4
(Mexico) M Llamas (Chile) P Rodríguez	2	7	6	4
(South Africa) G Forbes (South Africa) A Segal	6	5	8	6
(United Kingdom) W Knight (United Kingdom) A Pickard	3	3	0
3	(Australia) J Fraser (Australia) R Laver	6	6	6

Third round
(Spain) JL Arilla (Spain) M Santana	9	6	2	5	3
(Mexico) R Osuna (Mexico) A Palafox	7	2	6	7	6
(South Africa) G Forbes (South Africa) A Segal	3	9	4	14
3	(Australia) J Fraser (Australia) R Laver	6	7	6	16

Quarterfinals
(Mexico) R Osuna (Mexico) A Palafox	6	3	3	4
3	(Australia) J Fraser (Australia) R Laver	2	6	6	6

==== Section 4 ====
First round
(Philippines) Guillermo Hernandez (United States) Bobby Siska	1	3	4
(Italy) Nicola Pietrangeli (Italy) Orlando Sirola	6	6	6
(United States) Donald Dell (United States) Jon Douglas	9	4	6	6	6
(Australia) Wayne Reid (Australia) Warren Woodcock	11	6	3	4	2
(New Zealand) John McDonald (West Germany) Gunter Sanders	2	4	4
Q	(Australia) Barry Geraghty (United Kingdom) Roger Taylor	6	6	6
(United Kingdom) Gerry Oakley (United Kingdom) Humphrey Truman	5	5	7
(Czechoslovakia) Jiří Javorský (Australia) Alan Lane	7	7	9
(Brazil) Thomaz Koch (Brazil) José Edison Mandarino	6	3	6	6
(United Kingdom) Roger Becker (United Kingdom) Mike Sangster	2	6	4	3
(Austria) Franz Hainka (Austria) Franz Saiko	11	6	4	5	4
(United Kingdom) Geoff Ward (United Kingdom) Ivor Warwick	9	1	6	7	6
(Australia) Geoffrey Pares (Australia) Jim Shepherd	4	6	1	4
(United States) Gardnar Mulloy (United States) Ed Rubinoff	6	3	6	6
(Tunisia) Mustapha Belkhodja (France) Jean-Noël Grinda
2	(Australia) Bob Hewitt (Australia) Fred Stolle	w/o

Second round
(Italy) N Pietrangeli (Italy) O Sirola	6	4	1	13
(United States) D Dell (United States) J Douglas	3	6	6	15
(Australia) B Geraghty (United Kingdom) R Taylor	0	7	6	4
(Czechoslovakia) J Javorský (Australia) A Lane	6	9	4	6
(Brazil) T Koch (Brazil) JE Mandarino	6	6	6
(United Kingdom) G Ward (United Kingdom) I Warwick	2	1	2
(United States) G Mulloy (United States) E Rubinoff	1	4	3
2	(Australia) R Hewitt (Australia) F Stolle	6	6	6

Third round
(United States) D Dell (United States) J Douglas	6	3	8	6
(Czechoslovakia) J Javorský (Australia) A Lane	4	6	6	2
(Brazil) T Koch (Brazil) JE Mandarino	7	7	1	6	4
2	(Australia) R Hewitt (Australia) F Stolle	5	9	6	1	6

Quarterfinals
(United States) D Dell (United States) J Douglas	4	2	6	3
2	(Australia) R Hewitt (Australia) F Stolle	6	6	4	6
