= 1963 Wimbledon Championships – Men's doubles =

Men's doubles
- 1963 Wimbledon Championships

Final
- Champions: (Mexico) Rafael Osuna (Mexico) Antonio Palafox
- Runners-up: (France) Jean-Claude Barclay (France) Pierre Darmon
- Score: 4–6, 6–2, 6–2, 6–2

Details
- Draw: 68 (5Q)
- Seeds: 4

Events
Singles	men	women		boys	girls
Doubles	men	women	mixed	boys	girls
- Wimbledon Championships

Bob Hewitt and Fred Stolle were the defending champions, but lost in the third round to Michael Hann and Roger Taylor.

Rafael Osuna and Antonio Palafox defeated Jean-Claude Barclay and Pierre Darmon in the final, 4–6, 6–2, 6–2, 6–2 to win the gentlemen's doubles tennis title at the 1963 Wimbledon Championship.

== Seeds ==
1. (Australia) Bob Hewitt / (Australia) Fred Stolle (third round)
2. (Australia) Roy Emerson / (Spain) Manuel Santana (semifinals)
3. (United States) Chuck McKinley / (United States) Dennis Ralston (fourth round)
4. (Socialist Federal Republic of Yugoslavia) Boro Jovanović / (Socialist Federal Republic of Yugoslavia) Nikola Pilić (fourth round)

Click on the seed number of a player to go to their draw section.

== Draw ==
Key

- Q = Qualifier
- WC = Wild card
- LL = Lucky loser
- Alt = Alternate
- ITF = ITF entry
- PR = Protected ranking
- SR = Special ranking
- SE = Special exempt
- JE = Junior exempt
- JR = Junior Accelerator Programme entrant
- CO = College Accelerator Programme entrant
- NG = Next Gen Accelerator Program entrant
- w/o = Walkover
- r = Retired
- d = Defaulted

=== Finals ===
Quarterfinals
(South Africa) Gordon Forbes (South Africa) Abe Segal	12	6	7
(Brazil) Thomaz Koch (Brazil) José Edison Mandarino	10	2	5
(United Kingdom) Billy Knight (United Kingdom) Mike Sangster	3	6	5	6	4
(Mexico) Rafael Osuna (Mexico) Antonio Palafox	6	3	7	4	6
(France) Jean-Claude Barclay (France) Pierre Darmon	6	7	6
(Soviet Union) Toomas Leius (Soviet Union) Sergei Likhachev	4	5	3
(Australia) Ken Fletcher (Australia) John Newcombe	1	4	6	4
2	(Australia) Roy Emerson (Spain) Manuel Santana	6	6	4	6

Semifinals
(South Africa) Gordon Forbes (South Africa) Abe Segal	3	7	4	4
(Mexico) Rafael Osuna (Mexico) Antonio Palafox	6	5	6	6
(France) Jean-Claude Barclay (France) Pierre Darmon	6	7	3	6
2	(Australia) Roy Emerson (Spain) Manuel Santana	2	5	6	3

Final
(Mexico) Rafael Osuna (Mexico) Antonio Palafox	4	6	6	6
(France) Jean-Claude Barclay (France) Pierre Darmon	6	2	2	2

=== Top half ===
==== Section 1 ====
First round

Second round
1	(Australia) Bob Hewitt (Australia) Fred Stolle	6	6	6
Q	(United Kingdom) Paul Hutchins (United Kingdom) GM Price	0	1	1
Q	(United Kingdom) Geoffrey Bluett (United Kingdom) Clay Iles	6	2	1	2
(United Kingdom) Michael Hann (United Kingdom) Roger Taylor	4	6	6	6
(United States) Bill Bond (United States) Tom Edlefsen	6	6	4	3	6
(Australia) John Fraser (Australia) Bob Howe	3	2	6	6	1
(South Africa) Gordon Forbes (South Africa) Abe Segal	6	6	6
(United Kingdom) Geoff Ward (United Kingdom) Ivor Warwick	3	3	1

Third round
1	(Australia) R Hewitt (Australia) F Stolle	2	2	5
(United Kingdom) M Hann (United Kingdom) R Taylor	6	6	7
(United States) W Bond (United States) T Edlefsen	4	4	4
(South Africa) G Forbes (South Africa) A Segal	6	6	6

Quarterfinals
(United Kingdom) M Hann (United Kingdom) R Taylor	2	6	6	6	5
(South Africa) G Forbes (South Africa) A Segal	6	3	8	4	7

==== Section 2 ====
First round

Second round
(United Kingdom) John Crump (United Kingdom) Geoffrey Paish	9	7	3	2	6
(West Germany) Dieter Ecklebe (West Germany) Wolfgang Stuck	7	5	6	6	4
(United States) Bill Hoogs (United States) Jim McManus	7	6	7	2
(United States) Ron Fisher (Australia) Neville Holland	9	8	5	6
(Soviet Union) Alex Metreveli (Soviet Union) Mikhail Mozer	6	2	8	2
(Japan) Michio Fujii (Japan) Osamu Ishiguro	3	6	10	6
(Australia) Allan Kendall (Austria) Ladislav Legenstein	3	7	6	4
(Brazil) Thomaz Koch (Brazil) José Edison Mandarino	6	9	4	6

Third round
(United Kingdom) J Crump (United Kingdom) G Paish	4	6	4	6	3
(United States) R Fisher (Australia) N Holland	6	3	6	4	6
(Japan) M Fujii (Japan) O Ishiguro	3	5	8	1
(Brazil) T Koch (Brazil) JE Mandarino	6	7	6	6

Quarterfinals
(United States) R Fisher (Australia) N Holland	w/o
(Brazil) T Koch (Brazil) JE Mandarino

==== Section 3 ====
First round

Second round
4	(Socialist Federal Republic of Yugoslavia) Boro Jovanović (Socialist Federal Republic of Yugoslavia) Nikola Pilić	6	6	6
(Tunisia) Mustapha Belkhodja (France) Jean Borotra	3	3	1
(United States) Gardnar Mulloy (United States) Ed Rubinoff	6	5	3	4
(Denmark) Jørgen Ulrich (Denmark) Torben Ulrich	4	7	6	6
(Netherlands) Willem Maris (Netherlands) Pieter van Eijsden	2	4	6	6
(France) Patrice Beust (France) Daniel Contet	6	6	1	8
(United Kingdom) Billy Knight (United Kingdom) Mike Sangster	6	12	6
Q	(Mexico) Alfonso Ochoa (South Africa) Francis Rawstorne	4	10	4

Third round
4	(Socialist Federal Republic of Yugoslavia) B Jovanović (Socialist Federal Republic of Yugoslavia) N Pilić	6	6	2	8
(Denmark) J Ulrich (Denmark) T Ulrich	4	3	6	6
(France) P Beust (France) D Contet	6	2	7	5	1
(United Kingdom) W Knight (United Kingdom) M Sangster	3	6	5	7	6

Quarterfinals
4	(Socialist Federal Republic of Yugoslavia) B Jovanović (Socialist Federal Republic of Yugoslavia) N Pilić	6	15	6	3
(United Kingdom) W Knight (United Kingdom) M Sangster	3	17	8	6

==== Section 4 ====
First round
(Australia) John Keller (Australia) Ronald McKenzie	9	4	8	4
(Federation of Rhodesia and Nyasaland) Adrian Bey (Australia) Alan Lane	7	6	10	6
(United Kingdom) Peter Moys (United Kingdom) John Ward	1	4	4
(United Kingdom) Mark Cox (United Kingdom) Alan Mills	6	6	6

Second round
(India) Ramanathan Krishnan (Australia) Martin Mulligan	3	10	8	3
(Mexico) Rafael Osuna (Mexico) Antonio Palafox	6	12	6	6
(Argentina) Eduardo Soriano (Italy) Sergio Tacchini	6	3	5	6	3
(Italy) Nicola Pietrangeli (Italy) Orlando Sirola	3	6	7	3	6
(Australia) Bob Carmichael (Australia) Owen French	4	4	4
(Australia) Owen Davidson (Australia) Tony Roche	6	6	6
(Federation of Rhodesia and Nyasaland) A Bey (Australia) A Lane	4	2	8	3
(United Kingdom) M Cox (United Kingdom) A Mills	6	6	6	6

Third round
(Mexico) R Osuna (Mexico) A Palafox	3	2	6	6	13
(Italy) N Pietrangeli (Italy) O Sirola	6	6	3	2	11
(Australia) O Davidson (Australia) A Roche	13	6	4	6
(United Kingdom) M Cox (United Kingdom) A Mills	11	3	6	4

Quarterfinals
(Mexico) R Osuna (Mexico) A Palafox	6	6	5	6
(Australia) O Davidson (Australia) A Roche	3	4	7	3

=== Bottom half ===
==== Section 5 ====
First round
(France) Jean-Claude Barclay (France) Pierre Darmon	7	6	3	9	6
(France) Pierre Barthès (France) Jean-Noël Grinda	5	3	6	11	2
(United States) Charlie Pasarell (United States) Gene Scott	8	6	2	6
(Norway) Thorvald Moe (Norway) Gunnar Sjøwall	6	4	6	2

Second round
(France) J-C Barclay (France) P Darmon	6	3	3	6	9
(United States) C Pasarell (United States) E Scott	1	6	6	4	7
(Hungary) István Gulyás (Sweden) Jan-Erik Lundqvist	2	3	3
(United Kingdom) Gerry Oakley (United Kingdom) Humphrey Truman	6	6	6
(France) Alain Bresson (France) Christian Duxin	4	4	6	7	5
Q	(Haiti) Jean Édouard Baker (Canada) Keith Carpenter	6	6	3	5	7
(France) François Jauffret (France) Jacques Renavand	4	6	7	7
(South Africa) David Phillips (South Africa) Terry Ryan	6	4	9	9

Third round
(France) J-C Barclay (France) P Darmon	2	4	6	7	6
(United Kingdom) G Oakley (United Kingdom) H Truman	6	6	4	5	1
Q	(Haiti) JE Baker (Canada) K Carpenter	6	8	2	7
(South Africa) D Phillips (South Africa) T Ryan	4	6	6	5

Quarterfinals
(France) J-C Barclay (France) P Darmon	6	7	6
Q	(Haiti) JE Baker (Canada) K Carpenter	0	5	0

==== Section 6 ====
First round

Second round
(Finland) Reino Nyyssönen (Romania) Ion Țiriac	7	5	3
(Soviet Union) Toomas Leius (Soviet Union) Sergei Likhachev	9	7	6
Q	(United Kingdom) Roy Dixon (United Kingdom) Keith Wooldridge	4	6	4
(United States) Arthur Ashe (United States) Allen Fox	6	8	6
(Spain) Alberto Arilla (Spain) José Luis Arilla	4	4	4
(United Kingdom) Tony Pickard (United Kingdom) Bobby Wilson	6	6	6
(New Zealand) Ian Crookenden (Australia) Warren Jacques	4	6	3	6	3
3	(United States) Chuck McKinley (United States) Dennis Ralston	6	3	6	3	6

Third round
(Soviet Union) T Leius (Soviet Union) S Likhachev	6	8	6
(United States) A Ashe (United States) A Fox	4	6	2
(United Kingdom) A Pickard (United Kingdom) R Wilson	6	2	16
3	(United States) C McKinley (United States) D Ralston	8	6	18

Quarterfinals
(Soviet Union) T Leius (Soviet Union) S Likhachev	2	6	3	6	7
3	(United States) C McKinley (United States) D Ralston	6	3	6	3	5

==== Section 7 ====
First round

Second round
(Australia) Barry Geraghty (Australia) John Hillebrand	7	9	7
(Philippines) Guillermo Hernandez (United States) Bill Lenoir	5	7	5
(West Germany) Wilhelm Bungert (West Germany) Christian Kuhnke	6	9	19
(India) Premjit Lall (India) Jaidip Mukerjea	3	7	17
(South Africa) Frew McMillan (South Africa) Colin Zeeman	6	1	6	3	4
(South Africa) Keith Diepraam (South Africa) Cliff Drysdale	4	6	2	6	6
(Australia) Ken Fletcher (Australia) John Newcombe	6	6	6
(Austria) Franz Hainka (India) Naresh Kumar	3	3	3

Third round
(Australia) B Geraghty (Australia) J Hillebrand	4	4	4
(West Germany) W Bungert (West Germany) C Kuhnke	6	6	6
(South Africa) K Diepraam (South Africa) C Drysdale	3	6	10	2	3
(Australia) K Fletcher (Australia) J Newcombe	6	3	8	6	6

Quarterfinals
(West Germany) W Bungert (West Germany) C Kuhnke	9	9	6	2
(Australia) K Fletcher (Australia) J Newcombe	11	11	4	6

==== Section 8 ====
First round

Second round
(New Zealand) John McDonald (New Zealand) Mark Otway	4	6	3	6	4
(United States) Donald Dell (United States) Frank Froehling	6	3	6	4	6
(Brazil) Ronnie Barnes (Brazil) Carlos Fernandes	6	6	10
(Chile) Ernesto Aguirre (Chile) Patricio Rodríguez	4	0	8
(United Kingdom) Stanley Matthews (United Kingdom) Graham Stilwell	6	11	3	4	8
(West Germany) Ingo Buding (West Germany) Adolf Kreinberg	2	9	6	6	6
(United Kingdom) Colin Baxter (United Kingdom) Harry Matheson	2	4	3
2	(Australia) Roy Emerson (Spain) Manuel Santana	6	6	6

Third round
(United States) D Dell (United States) F Froehling	7	1	4
(Brazil) R Barnes (Brazil) C Fernandes	9	6	6
(United Kingdom) S Matthews (United Kingdom) G Stilwell	1	3	1
2	(Australia) R Emerson (Spain) M Santana	6	6	6

Quarterfinals
(Brazil) R Barnes (Brazil) C Fernandes	8	6	4	3	3
2	(Australia) R Emerson (Spain) M Santana	6	2	6	6	6
