= 1962 Wimbledon Championships – Men's singles =

Men's singles
- 1962 Wimbledon Championships

Final
- Champion: (Australia) Rod Laver
- Runner-up: (Australia) Martin Mulligan
- Score: 6–2, 6–2, 6–1

Details
- Draw: 128 (10Q)
- Seeds: 8

Events
Singles	men	women		boys	girls
Doubles	men	women	mixed	boys	girls
- Wimbledon Championships

Defending champion Rod Laver defeated Martin Mulligan in the final, 6–2, 6–2, 6–1 to win the gentlemen's singles tennis title at the 1962 Wimbledon Championships. It marked the third step of an eventual Grand Slam for Laver.

== Seeds ==
1. (Australia) Rod Laver (champion)
2. (Australia) Roy Emerson (fourth round)
3. (Australia) Neale Fraser (semifinals)
4. (India) Ramanathan Krishnan (third round)
5. (United States) Chuck McKinley (second round)
6. (Spain) Manuel Santana (quarterfinals)
7. (Italy) Nicola Pietrangeli (third round)
8. (Australia) Bob Hewitt (quarterfinals)

Click on the seed number of a player to go to their draw section.

== Draw ==
Key

- Q = Qualifier
- WC = Wild card
- LL = Lucky loser
- Alt = Alternate
- ITF = ITF entry
- PR = Protected ranking
- SR = Special ranking
- SE = Special exempt
- JE = Junior exempt
- JR = Junior Accelerator Programme entrant
- CO = College Accelerator Programme entrant
- NG = Next Gen Accelerator Program entrant
- w/o = Walkover
- r = Retired
- d = Defaulted

=== Finals ===
Quarterfinals
1	(Australia) Rod Laver	14	9	6	6
6	(Spain) Manuel Santana	16	7	2	2
3	(Australia) Neale Fraser	6	6	4	4	6
(Mexico) Rafael Osuna	3	1	6	6	2
(Australia) Ken Fletcher	6	9	4	1	2
(Australia) John Fraser	1	7	6	6	6
8	(Australia) Bob Hewitt	8	4	3	4
(Australia) Martin Mulligan	6	6	6	6

Semifinals
1	(Australia) Rod Laver	10	6	7
3	(Australia) Neale Fraser	8	1	5
(Australia) John Fraser	3	2	2
(Australia) Martin Mulligan	6	6	6

Final
1	(Australia) Rod Laver	6	6	6
(Australia) Martin Mulligan	2	2	1

=== Top half ===
==== Section 1 ====
First round
1	(Australia) Rod Laver	7	6	6
(India) Naresh Kumar	5	1	2
(United Kingdom) Tony Pickard	2	6	6	6
Q	(Japan) Michio Fujii	6	1	3	1
(United States) Whitney Reed	6	6	6
(Austria) Franz Saiko	3	2	3
(Mexico) Joaquín Reyes	2	2	5
Q	(South Africa) Frew McMillan	6	6	7
(Italy) Sergio Jacobini	3	4	1
(Venezuela) Isaías Pimentel	6	6	6
(Norway) Thorvald Moe	6	10	6
(Ecuador) Eduardo Zuleta	4	8	1
(Chile) Patricio Rodríguez	6	4	6	7
(Australia) Warren Woodcock	0	6	4	5
(New Zealand) Mark Otway	3	4	6	4
(France) Pierre Darmon	6	6	1	6

Second round
1	(Australia) R Laver	6	6	6
(United Kingdom) A Pickard	1	2	2
(United States) W Reed	8	4	6	6
Q	(South Africa) F McMillan	6	6	2	4
(Venezuela) I Pimentel	6	5	3	3
(Norway) T Moe	2	7	6	6
(Chile) P Rodríguez	0	2	2
(France) P Darmon	6	6	6

Third round
1	(Australia) R Laver	6	6	6
(United States) W Reed	4	1	4
(Norway) T Moe	3	4	4
(France) P Darmon	6	6	6

Fourth round
1	(Australia) R Laver	6	6	13
(France) P Darmon	3	2	11

==== Section 2 ====
First round
6	(Spain) Manuel Santana	6	6	6
(South Africa) Cliff Drysdale	3	1	3
(Belgium) Jacques Brichant	5	6	1	10
(Soviet Union) Toomas Leius	7	3	6	12
(France) Jacques Renavand	6	6	6
(United Kingdom) Julian Coni	1	3	1
Q	(United Kingdom) Humphrey Truman	7	6	4	12	2
(Philippines) Guillermo Hernandez	5	4	6	14	6
(West Germany) Dieter Ecklebe	4	2	2
(Australia) Owen Davidson	6	6	6
(India) Akhtar Ali	6	6	4	0	2
(Finland) Reino Nyyssönen	3	4	6	6	6
Q	(Australia) Bill Bowrey	15	6	6
(Mexico) Gabino Palafox	13	3	2
(United States) Frank Froehling	16	4	6	6
(United Kingdom) Roger Becker	14	6	4	4

Second round
6	(Spain) M Santana	6	6	6
(Soviet Union) T Leius	2	3	4
(France) J Renavand	6	6	7
(Philippines) G Hernandez	0	3	5
(Australia) O Davidson	11	2	6	6
(Finland) R Nyyssönen	9	6	1	4
Q	(Australia) W Bowrey	5	3	4
(United States) F Froehling	7	6	6

Third round
6	(Spain) M Santana	6	4	6	6
(France) J Renavand	3	6	4	1
(Australia) O Davidson	6	5	8	4
(United States) F Froehling	8	7	6	6

Fourth round
6	(Spain) M Santana	12	6	8	6
(United States) F Froehling	10	3	10	3

==== Section 3 ====
First round
3	(Australia) Neale Fraser	6	6	6
(United States) Ned Neely	0	4	3
(Australia) Geoffrey Pares	5	10	6	6
(Australia) Neville Holland	7	8	3	0
(New Zealand) John McDonald	3	5	6
(France) Gérard Pilet	6	7	8
(Argentina) Eduardo Soriano	3	15	2
(United Kingdom) Billy Knight	6	17	6
(India) Jaidip Mukerjea	6	6	6
Q	(Australia) Allan Kendall	0	3	1
(United States) Donald Dell	6	6	6
(Switzerland) Jorge Paulo Lemann	2	4	1
(Canada) François Godbout	7	5	2
(Spain) Juan Manuel Couder	9	7	6
(Poland) Wiesław Gąsiorek	2	1	1
(West Germany) Christian Kuhnke	6	6	6

Second round
3	(Australia) N Fraser	6	6	6
(Australia) G Pares	0	3	4
(France) G Pilet	4	5	4
(United Kingdom) W Knight	6	7	6
(India) J Mukerjea	6	3	3	6	6
(United States) D Dell	4	6	6	4	2
(Spain) JM Couder	1	1	4
(West Germany) C Kuhnke	6	6	6

Third round
3	(Australia) N Fraser	6	16	10
(United Kingdom) W Knight	4	14	8
(India) J Mukerjea	7	4	5
(West Germany) C Kuhnke	9	6	7

Fourth round
3	(Australia) N Fraser	8	8	6	6
(West Germany) C Kuhnke	6	10	1	3

==== Section 4 ====
First round
7	(Italy) Nicola Pietrangeli	10	6	6
(Australia) Alan Lane	8	2	3
Q	(United Kingdom) Malcolm Gracie	4	1	4
(Socialist Federal Republic of Yugoslavia) Nikola Pilić	6	6	6
(United States) Malcolm Fox	6	6	6
(United States) Gardnar Mulloy	3	3	4
Q	(United Kingdom) Roy Dixon	6	2	2	2
(United Kingdom) Alan Mills	3	6	6	6
(Australia) John Newcombe	8	7	6
(United States) Gene Scott	6	5	4
(Mexico) Rafael Osuna	8	1	6	6	6
(Brazil) José Edison Mandarino	10	6	4	3	3
Q	(South Africa) Robin Sanders	6	6	6
(United Kingdom) Geoffrey Paish	4	2	4
(South Africa) Gordon Forbes	6	6	6
(United States) Paul Palmer	3	1	4

Second round
7	(Italy) N Pietrangeli	24	6	6
(Socialist Federal Republic of Yugoslavia) N Pilić	22	2	4
(United States) M Fox	7	3	2
(United Kingdom) A Mills	9	6	6
(Australia) J Newcombe	4	6	5	3
(Mexico) R Osuna	6	3	7	6
Q	(South Africa) R Sanders	1	3	1
(South Africa) G Forbes	6	6	6

Third round
7	(Italy) N Pietrangeli	4	6	6	5	1
(United Kingdom) A Mills	6	2	4	7	6
(Mexico) R Osuna	6	9	8	6
(South Africa) G Forbes	2	11	6	4

Fourth round
(United Kingdom) A Mills	3	3	2
(Mexico) R Osuna	6	6	6

=== Bottom half ===
==== Section 5 ====
First round
(Austria) Ladislav Legenstein	3	6	10	3
(New Zealand) Ian Crookenden	6	1	12	6
(United Kingdom) John Barrett	6	3	13	10	2
(Federation of Rhodesia and Nyasaland) Frank Salomon	4	6	11	12	6
(Tunisia) Mustapha Belkhodja	w/o
(United Kingdom) Roger Taylor
(United Kingdom) Jimmy Tattersall	4	4	5
(Australia) Jim Shepherd	6	6	7
(Australia) Ken Fletcher	6	6	6
(Australia) Barry Phillips-Moore	2	3	3
(Japan) Osamu Ishiguro	4	6	6	6
(France) Paul Jalabert	6	4	2	1
(United Kingdom) Michael Hann	6	6	5	7
(Australia) Greg Hughes	4	4	7	5
Q	(Australia) Owen French	1	2	1
5	(United States) Chuck McKinley	6	6	6

Second round
(New Zealand) I Crookenden	3	6	3	6	6
(Federation of Rhodesia and Nyasaland) F Salomon	6	3	6	2	3
(United Kingdom) R Taylor	9	13	19
(Australia) J Shepherd	7	11	17
(Australia) K Fletcher	6	3	6	5	6
(Japan) O Ishiguro	2	6	4	7	4
(United Kingdom) M Hann	6	6	6
5	(United States) C McKinley	3	2	2

Third round
(New Zealand) I Crookenden	3	6	7	4
(United Kingdom) R Taylor	6	4	9	6
(Australia) K Fletcher	6	6	6
(United Kingdom) M Hann	3	3	1

Fourth round
(United Kingdom) R Taylor	6	3	8	4	4
(Australia) K Fletcher	2	6	6	6	6

==== Section 6 ====
First round
(Australia) Warren Jacques	6	4	6	4	4
(West Germany) Ingo Buding	2	6	4	6	6
(Mexico) Antonio Palafox	6	6	6
(Colombia) William Álvarez	3	2	3
(Socialist Federal Republic of Yugoslavia) Boro Jovanović	8	7	6	5	4
(Italy) Orlando Sirola	10	5	2	7	6
(United States) Crawford Henry	6	3	9	0
(United Kingdom) Mike Sangster	3	6	11	6
(Spain) Alberto Arilla	4	3	4
(United States) Chris Crawford	6	6	6
(Australia) John Fraser	1	6	6	6
(Brazil) Carlos Fernandes	6	4	3	4
(South Africa) Keith Diepraam	6	6	6
(Australia) John Hillebrand	4	2	4
(Belgium) Eric Drossart	2	3	5
4	(India) Ramanathan Krishnan	6	6	7

Second round
(West Germany) I Buding	3	6	5	3
(Mexico) A Palafox	6	4	7	6
(Italy) O Sirola	2	2	6	6	6
(United Kingdom) M Sangster	6	6	3	2	0
(United States) C Crawford	7	6	4	4
(Australia) J Fraser	9	4	6	6
(South Africa) K Diepraam	2	5	4
4	(India) R Krishnan	6	7	6

Third round
(Mexico) A Palafox	3	6	2	1
(Italy) O Sirola	6	1	6	6
(Australia) J Fraser	5
4	(India) R Krishnan	2^{r}

Fourth round
(Italy) O Sirola	4	4	2
(Australia) J Fraser	6	6	6

==== Section 7 ====
First round
(Hungary) István Gulyás	6	4	2	6	2
(Spain) José Luis Arilla	4	6	6	1	6
(United Kingdom) Mark Cox	5	2	2
(Australia) Bob Howe	7	6	6
(Ecuador) Miguel Olvera	6	7	1	2
(France) Jean-Noël Grinda	3	9	6	6
(Austria) Franz Hainka	3	6	2	2
(India) Premjit Lall	6	4	6	6
(United States) Jack Frost	4	2	2
(United Kingdom) Bobby Wilson	6	6	6
(United States) Bobby Siska	6	4	6	5
(Mexico) Mario Llamas	8	6	4	7
(United States) Ed Rubinoff	3	5	8	6	2
(Denmark) Jørgen Ulrich	6	7	6	1	6
(Australia) Barry Geraghty	1	6	3	2
8	(Australia) Bob Hewitt	6	3	6	6

Second round
(Spain) JL Arilla	6	7	3	2	5
(Australia) R Howe	4	5	6	6	7
(France) J-N Grinda	3	3	6
(India) P Lall	6	6	8
(United Kingdom) R Wilson	7	3	6	6
(Mexico) M Llamas	5	6	4	4
(Denmark) J Ulrich	7	1	7	6	4
8	(Australia) R Hewitt	9	6	5	1	6

Third round
(Australia) R Howe	5	4	6	6	6
(India) P Lall	7	6	4	3	3
(United Kingdom) R Wilson	6	6	6	4	5
8	(Australia) R Hewitt	2	8	2	6	7

Fourth round
(Australia) R Howe	6	6	4	3	8
8	(Australia) R Hewitt	3	1	6	6	10

==== Section 8 ====
First round
(Australia) Martin Mulligan	6	6	4	6
(Australia) Wayne Reid	4	3	6	1
(Czechoslovakia) Jiří Javorský	2	3	10
(Australia) John Sharpe	6	6	12
(United States) Dennis Ralston	6	6	6
Q	(Australia) Geoff Knox	2	2	2
(Soviet Union) Sergei Likhachev	2	4	6	6	6
(Brazil) Ronnie Barnes	6	6	1	4	4
(South Africa) Abe Segal	2	6	4	6	3
(Australia) Fred Stolle	6	2	6	3	6
(Italy) Sergio Tacchini	9	7	4	7
(Spain) Juan Gisbert	7	5	6	5
(Romania) Ion Țiriac	5	2	2
(West Germany) Wilhelm Bungert	7	6	6
(United States) Jon Douglas	3	4	6
2	(Australia) Roy Emerson	6	6	8

Second round
(Australia) M Mulligan	6	7	6
(Australia) J Sharpe	1	5	4
(United States) D Ralston	6	6	6
(Soviet Union) S Likhachev	4	3	3
(Australia) F Stolle	2	6	6	6
(Italy) S Tacchini	6	3	4	2
(West Germany) W Bungert	15	6	3	0	4
2	(Australia) R Emerson	13	4	6	6	6

Third round
(Australia) M Mulligan	3	9	6	2	7
(United States) D Ralston	6	7	3	6	5
(Australia) F Stolle	4	4	0
2	(Australia) R Emerson	6	6	6

Fourth round
(Australia) M Mulligan	3	6	0
2	(Australia) R Emerson	6	1	0^{r}

Preceded by 1962 French Championships	Grand Slams; Men's singles	Succeeded by 1962 U.S. Championships
