= 1963 Wimbledon Championships – Men's singles =

Men's singles
- 1963 Wimbledon Championships

Final
- Champion: (United States) Chuck McKinley
- Runner-up: (Australia) Fred Stolle
- Score: 9–7, 6–1, 6–4

Details
- Draw: 128 (10Q)
- Seeds: 8

Events
Singles	men	women		boys	girls
Doubles	men	women	mixed	boys	girls
- Wimbledon Championships

Chuck McKinley defeated Fred Stolle 9–7, 6–1, 6–4 in the final to win the gentlemen's singles tennis title at the 1963 Wimbledon Championships. Rod Laver was the defending champion, but was ineligible to compete after turning professional.

== Seeds ==
1. (Australia) Roy Emerson (quarterfinals)
2. (Spain) Manuel Santana (semifinals)
3. (Australia) Ken Fletcher (second round)
4. (United States) Chuck McKinley (champion)
5. (Australia) Martin Mulligan (fourth round)
6. (France) Pierre Darmon (second round)
7. (Sweden) Jan-Erik Lundqvist (fourth round)
8. (United Kingdom) Mike Sangster (first round)

Click on the seed number of a player to go to their draw section.

== Draw ==
Key

- Q = Qualifier
- WC = Wild card
- LL = Lucky loser
- Alt = Alternate
- ITF = ITF entry
- PR = Protected ranking
- SR = Special ranking
- SE = Special exempt
- JE = Junior exempt
- JR = Junior Accelerator Programme entrant
- CO = College Accelerator Programme entrant
- NG = Next Gen Accelerator Program entrant
- w/o = Walkover
- r = Retired
- d = Defaulted

=== Finals ===
Quarterfinals
1	(Australia) Roy Emerson	6	6	3	6	3
(West Germany) Wilhelm Bungert	8	3	6	4	6
4	(United States) Chuck McKinley	8	6	6
(United Kingdom) Bobby Wilson	6	4	2
(United States) Frank Froehling	7	5	4
(Australia) Fred Stolle	9	7	6
(West Germany) Christian Kuhnke	3	4	4
2	(Spain) Manuel Santana	6	6	6

Semifinals
(West Germany) Wilhelm Bungert	2	4	6
4	(United States) Chuck McKinley	6	6	8
(Australia) Fred Stolle	8	6	7
2	(Spain) Manuel Santana	6	1	5

Final
4	(United States) Chuck McKinley	9	6	6
(Australia) Fred Stolle	7	1	4

=== Top half ===
==== Section 1 ====
First round
1	(Australia) Roy Emerson	6	6	6
(United States) Bill Lenoir	0	4	3
(Italy) Orlando Sirola	6	1	6	3	7
(United States) Gardnar Mulloy	3	6	3	6	5
(United States) Gene Scott	7	4	7
(Australia) Owen Davidson	9	6	9
Q	(United Kingdom) Malcolm Gracie	1	6	3	4
(Australia) Bob Carmichael	6	2	6	6
(Spain) Juan Manuel Couder	1	5	1
(Brazil) Ronnie Barnes	6	7	6
(South Africa) Keith Diepraam	3	6	6	6
(United Kingdom) Harry Matheson	6	4	3	3
(Austria) Ladislav Legenstein	4	4	3
(United States) Dennis Ralston	6	6	6
(New Zealand) Ian Crookenden	1	1	4
(India) Ramanathan Krishnan	6	6	6

Second round
1	(Australia) R Emerson	8	7	6
(Italy) O Sirola	6	5	2
(Australia) O Davidson	7	6	6
(Australia) R Carmichael	5	3	1
(Brazil) R Barnes	6	2	10	6
(South Africa) K Diepraam	2	6	8	0
(United States) D Ralston	3	3	6	10
(India) R Krishnan	6	6	3	12

Third round
1	(Australia) R Emerson	6	8	6
(Australia) O Davidson	4	6	2
(Brazil) R Barnes	4	0	4
(India) R Krishnan	6	6	6

Fourth round
1	(Australia) R Emerson	6	6	6
(India) R Krishnan	1	4	0

==== Section 2 ====
First round
8	(United Kingdom) Mike Sangster	3	5	3
(West Germany) Wilhelm Bungert	6	7	6
(France) Patrice Beust	4	6	3	12
(Belgium) Eric Drossart	6	3	6	14
(France) Jean-Noël Grinda	8	8	1	0
(Hungary) István Gulyás	6	10	6	6
(Australia) Warren Jacques	1	4	4
(Soviet Union) Toomas Leius	6	6	6
Q	(United Kingdom) John Crump	11	4	2	2
(West Germany) Wolfgang Stuck	9	6	6	6
(Argentina) Eduardo Soriano	4	6	6	3	2
(United Kingdom) Tony Pickard	6	1	4	6	6
(West Germany) Adolf Kreinberg	3	7	6	4
(Spain) José Luis Arilla	6	9	4	6
(Socialist Federal Republic of Yugoslavia) Boro Jovanović	6	7	6
(France) Christian Duxin	2	5	1

Second round
(West Germany) W Bungert	10	6	6	6
(Belgium) E Drossart	8	8	3	3
(Hungary) I Gulyás	3	10	2
(Soviet Union) T Leius	6	12	6
(West Germany) W Stuck	2	6	3	11	6
(United Kingdom) A Pickard	6	4	6	9	8
(Spain) JL Arilla	6	7	6
(Socialist Federal Republic of Yugoslavia) B Jovanović	1	5	2

Third round
(West Germany) W Bungert	6	3	6	6
(Soviet Union) T Leius	4	6	3	4
(United Kingdom) A Pickard	10	2	3
(Spain) JL Arilla	12	6	6

Fourth round
(West Germany) W Bungert	4	6	6	10	7
(Spain) JL Arilla	6	3	0	12	5

==== Section 3 ====
First round
4	(United States) Chuck McKinley	6	6	8
(South Africa) Cliff Drysdale	3	3	6
(Australia) John Fraser	2	4	4
(Australia) Alan Lane	6	6	6
(United States) Arthur Ashe	3	4	6	6	6
(Brazil) Carlos Fernandes	6	6	4	4	1
(Australia) John Newcombe	12	7	6	6	3
(Australia) John Hillebrand	14	9	4	4	6
(United Kingdom) Alan Mills	6	6	13
(Norway) Thorvald Moe	4	1	11
(Chile) Patricio Rodríguez	2	4	8	10	4
(India) Jaidip Mukerjea	6	6	6	8	6
(West Germany) Ingo Buding	3	2	2^{r}
(Japan) Osamu Ishiguro	6	6	4
(Mexico) Alfonso Ochoa	5	4	1
Q	(Canada) Keith Carpenter	7	6	6

Second round
4	(United States) C McKinley	7	6	8
(Australia) A Lane	5	4	6
(United States) A Ashe	5	7	11	3	6
(Australia) J Hillebrand	7	5	9	6	3
(United Kingdom) A Mills	5	7	6	10
(India) J Mukerjea	7	9	2	12
(Japan) O Ishiguro	6	3	6	17
Q	(Canada) K Carpenter	2	6	3	15

Third round
4	(United States) C McKinley	6	6	6
(United States) A Ashe	3	2	2
(India) J Mukerjea	6	6	10
(Japan) O Ishiguro	3	3	8

Fourth round
4	(United States) C McKinley	6	8	6
(India) J Mukerjea	3	6	3

==== Section 4 ====
First round
5	(Australia) Martin Mulligan	6	6	6
(Tunisia) Mustapha Belkhodja	1	2	2
(Spain) Juan Gisbert	6	11	3	6
Q	(Italy) Michele Pirro	2	9	6	2
(Australia) Bob Hewitt	6	6	6
(Soviet Union) Alex Metreveli	3	3	4
(South Africa) David Phillips	6	6	7
(Italy) Giordano Maioli	3	3	5
(France) Daniel Contet	6	1	3
(United States) Ed Rubinoff	8	6	6
(United States) Bill Bond	4	0	4
(Denmark) Jørgen Ulrich	6	6	6
(France) Jacques Renavand	2	0	2
(United Kingdom) Bobby Wilson	6	6	6
(France) Pierre Barthès	3	8	2	4
(Australia) Ronald McKenzie	6	6	6	6

Second round
5	(Australia) M Mulligan	6	6	6
(Spain) J Gisbert	1	4	3
(Australia) R Hewitt	6	6	6
(South Africa) D Phillips	1	3	2
(United States) E Rubinoff	1	1	6
(Denmark) J Ulrich	6	6	8
(United Kingdom) R Wilson	6	6	6
(Australia) R McKenzie	4	1	4

Third round
5	(Australia) M Mulligan	6	6	13
(Australia) R Hewitt	4	3	11
(Denmark) J Ulrich	2	2	3
(United Kingdom) R Wilson	6	6	6

Fourth round
5	(Australia) M Mulligan	4	1	7
(United Kingdom) R Wilson	6	6	9

=== Bottom half ===
==== Section 5 ====
First round
(South Africa) Abe Segal	6	2	3	0
(United Kingdom) Roger Taylor	3	6	6	6
(India) Premjit Lall	6	6	6
(Finland) Reino Nyyssönen	3	4	1
(South Africa) Frew McMillan	6	2	7	6
(West Germany) Dieter Ecklebe	4	6	5	4
(United States) Jack Frost	3	7	9	13
(Brazil) Thomaz Koch	6	5	7	11
(France) Alain Bresson	2	6	2	2
Q	(Australia) Barry Geraghty	6	3	6	6
(United States) Frank Froehling	1	8	6	3	6
(United States) Donald Dell	6	6	3	6	3
(Australia) Bob Howe	6	6	6
(Italy) Antonio Maggi	3	3	3
(Socialist Federal Republic of Yugoslavia) Nikola Pilić	4	9	6	6
6	(France) Pierre Darmon	6	7	8	8

Second round
(United Kingdom) R Taylor	6	6	6
(India) P Lall	3	4	4
(South Africa) F McMillan	4	1	5
(United States) J Frost	6	6	7
Q	(Australia) B Geraghty	6	13	6	1	2
(United States) F Froehling	3	15	4	6	6
(Australia) R Howe	3	1	6	6	6
6	(France) P Darmon	6	6	3	4	3

Third round
(United Kingdom) R Taylor	6	7	4	3	9
(United States) J Frost	2	5	6	6	7
(United States) F Froehling	6	6	3
(Australia) R Howe	3	4	2^{r}

Fourth round
(United Kingdom) R Taylor	6	4	9	2	13
(United States) F Froehling	2	6	7	6	15

==== Section 6 ====
First round
Q	(South Africa) Ray Moore	0	6	4
(Mexico) Antonio Palafox	6	8	6
Q	(United States) Bill Hoogs	8	6	6	6
(Spain) Alberto Arilla	10	0	0	4
LL	(Haiti) Jean Édouard Baker	18	3	4
(Switzerland) Dimitri Sturdza	20	6	6
(Soviet Union) Sergei Likhachev	2	6	6	5	6
(United States) Jim McManus	6	4	4	7	3
(Italy) Nicola Pietrangeli	6	3	4	6	6
(United States) Cliff Buchholz	3	6	6	3	3
(Colombia) William Álvarez	1	4	3
(United Kingdom) Michael Hann	6	6	6
Q	(United Kingdom) Keith Wooldridge	1	2	1
(Australia) Fred Stolle	6	6	6
(Norway) Gunnar Sjøwall	5	4	4
3	(Australia) Ken Fletcher	7	6	6

Second round
(Mexico) A Palafox	6	6	8	1	6
Q	(United States) W Hoogs	2	2	10	6	2
(Switzerland) D Sturdza	3	4	6	7
(Soviet Union) S Likhachev	6	6	4	9
(Italy) N Pietrangeli	5	7	6	6
(United Kingdom) M Hann	7	5	2	4
(Australia) F Stolle	7	9	13	6
3	(Australia) K Fletcher	5	7	15	0

Third round
(Mexico) A Palafox	6	4	6	6
(Soviet Union) S Likhachev	4	6	3	3
(Italy) N Pietrangeli	3	3^{r}
(Australia) F Stolle	6	4

Fourth round
(Mexico) A Palafox	5	3	3
(Australia) F Stolle	7	6	6

==== Section 7 ====
First round
(United Kingdom) Mark Cox	4	6	6	7
Q	(United States) Ron Fisher	6	4	3	5
(France) Jean-Claude Barclay	4	3	8
(West Germany) Christian Kuhnke	6	6	10
(United Kingdom) Billy Knight	6	6	6
(Philippines) Guillermo Hernandez	3	4	2
(South Africa) Gordon Forbes	6	6	6
(India) Naresh Kumar	4	4	3
(United States) Tom Edlefsen	3	6	7	1	6
(Australia) Allan Kendall	6	3	5	6	4
(Austria) Franz Hainka	3	3	5
(United States) Charlie Pasarell	6	6	7
(Poland) Andrzej Licis	3	2	4
(France) François Jauffret	6	6	6
(Australia) Neville Holland	2	1	2
7	(Sweden) Jan-Erik Lundqvist	6	6	6

Second round
(United Kingdom) M Cox	6	4	3	4
(West Germany) C Kuhnke	2	6	6	6
(United Kingdom) W Knight	1	7	6	9	6
(South Africa) G Forbes	6	5	4	11	3
(United States) T Edlefsen	6	9	10	6
(United States) C Pasarell	3	11	8	3
(France) F Jauffret	6	4	6	3
7	(Sweden) J-E Lundqvist	8	6	3	6

Third round
(West Germany) C Kuhnke	12	6	6
(United Kingdom) W Knight	10	3	4
(United States) T Edlefsen	2	4	0
7	(Sweden) J-E Lundqvist	6	6	6

Fourth round
(West Germany) C Kuhnke	6	6	6
7	(Sweden) J-E Lundqvist	4	3	2

==== Section 8 ====
First round
(Italy) Giuseppe Merlo	6	6	6
(United Kingdom) Graham Stilwell	4	4	2
Q	(United States) Bobby Siska	6	6	7
(Romania) Ion Țiriac	4	2	5
(United States) Allen Fox	4	10	4
(Federation of Rhodesia and Nyasaland) Adrian Bey	6	12	6
(United States) Herbie Flam	7	4	6	4	6
(Australia) Geoff Knox	5	6	2	6	3
(Soviet Union) Mikhail Mozer	4	7	3
(Mexico) Rafael Osuna	6	9	6
(Italy) Sergio Tacchini	4	3	1
(United Kingdom) Stanley Matthews	6	6	6
(Brazil) José Edison Mandarino	6	6	6
(Japan) Michio Fujii	4	1	1
(Australia) Tony Roche	4	4	1
2	(Spain) Manuel Santana	6	6	6

Second round
(Italy) G Merlo	6	6	6
Q	(United States) R Siska	3	2	3
(Federation of Rhodesia and Nyasaland) A Bey	6	13	2	4	12
(United States) H Flam	1	11	6	6	10
(Mexico) R Osuna	7	4	8	6
(United Kingdom) S Matthews	5	6	6	2
(Brazil) JE Mandarino	3	3	3
2	(Spain) M Santana	6	6	6

Third round
(Italy) G Merlo	2	3	3
(Federation of Rhodesia and Nyasaland) A Bey	6	6	6
(Mexico) R Osuna	6	6	1	3	4
2	(Spain) M Santana	2	0	6	6	6

Fourth round
(Federation of Rhodesia and Nyasaland) A Bey	3	1	13	3
2	(Spain) M Santana	6	6	11	6

Preceded by 1963 French Championships	Grand Slams; Men's Singles	Succeeded by 1963 U.S. Championships
