= 1963 in tennis =

This page covers all the important events in the sport of tennis in 1963. It provides the results of notable tournaments throughout the year on both the men's and women's ILTF tennis circuits.

== Australian Open ==
Category	Champion(s)	Finalist(s)	Score
Men's singles	(Australia) Roy Emerson	(Australia) Ken Fletcher	6–3, 6–3, 6–1
Women's singles	(Australia) Margaret Smith	(Australia) Jan Lehane	6–2, 6–2
Men's doubles	(Australia) Bob Hewitt (Australia) Fred Stolle	(Australia) Ken Fletcher (Australia) John Newcombe	6–2, 1–6, 6–3, 3–6, 6–3
Women's doubles	(Australia) Robyn Ebbern (Australia) Margaret Smith	(Australia) Jan Lehane (Australia) Lesley Turner	6–1, 6–3
Mixed doubles	(Australia) Margaret Smith (Australia) Ken Fletcher	(Australia) Lesley Turner (Australia) Fred Stolle	7–5, 5–7, 6–4

== French Open ==
Category	Champion(s)	Finalist(s)	Score
Men's singles	(Australia) Roy Emerson	(France) Pierre Darmon	3–6, 6–1, 6–4, 6–4
Women's singles	(Australia) Lesley Turner	(United Kingdom) Ann Jones	2–6, 6–3, 7–5
Men's doubles	(Australia) Roy Emerson (Spain) Manuel Santana	(South Africa) Gordon Forbes (South Africa) Abe Segal	6–2, 6–4, 6–4
Women's doubles	(United Kingdom) Ann Jones (South Africa) Renée Schuurman	(Australia) Robyn Ebbern (Australia) Margaret Smith	7–5, 6–4
Mixed doubles	(Australia) Margaret Smith (Australia) Ken Fletcher	(Australia) Lesley Turner (Australia) Fred Stolle	6–1, 6–2

== Wimbledon ==
Category	Champion(s)	Finalist(s)	Score
Men's singles	(United States) Chuck McKinley	(Australia) Fred Stolle	9–7, 6–1, 6–4
Women's singles	(Australia) Margaret Smith	(United States) Billie Jean Moffitt	6–3, 6–4
Men's doubles	(Mexico) Rafael Osuna (Mexico) Antonio Palafox	(France) Jean-Claude Barclay (France) Pierre Darmon	4–6, 6–2, 6–2, 6–2
Women's doubles	(Brazil) Maria Bueno (United States) Darlene Hard	(Australia) Robyn Ebbern (Australia) Margaret Smith	8–6, 9–7
Mixed doubles	(Australia) Ken Fletcher (Australia) Margaret Smith	(Australia) Bob Hewitt (United States) Darlene Hard	11–9, 6–4

== US Open ==
Category	Champion(s)	Finalist(s)	Score
Men's singles	(Mexico) Rafael Osuna	(United States) Frank Froehling	7–5, 6–4, 6–2
Women's singles	(Brazil) Maria Bueno	(Australia) Margaret Smith	7–5, 6–4
Men's doubles	(United States) Chuck McKinley (United States) Dennis Ralston	(Mexico) Rafael Osuna (Mexico) Antonio Palafox	9–7, 4–6, 5–7, 6–3, 11–9
Women's doubles	(Australia) Robyn Ebbern (Australia) Margaret Smith	(Brazil) Maria Bueno (United States) Darlene Hard	4–6, 10–8, 6–3
Mixed doubles	(Australia) Margaret Smith (Australia) Ken Fletcher	(Australia) Judy Tegart (United States) Ed Rubinoff	3–6, 8–6, 6–2
