= 1962 Davis Cup America Zone =

International tennis competition

The America Zone was one of the three regional zones of the 1962 Davis Cup.

5 teams entered the America Zone, with the winner going on to compete in the Inter-Zonal Zone against the winners of the Eastern Zone and Europe Zone. Mexico defeated Yugoslavia in the final and progressed to the Inter-Zonal Zone.

== Draw ==
Quarterfinals; 13–15 July
Cleveland, OH, United States (clay)
United States	5
Canada	0
Mexico
bye
bye
Caribbean/West Indies
bye
Yugoslavia

Semifinals; 4–8 August
Mexico City, Mexico (clay)
United States	2
Mexico	3
Port of Spain, Trinidad and Tobago (clay)
Caribbean/West Indies	1
Yugoslavia	4

Final; 17–19 August
Mexico City, Mexico (clay)
Mexico	4
Yugoslavia	1

== Quarterfinals ==
=== United States vs. Canada ===
United States
5
Cleveland Skating Club, Cleveland, OH, United States
13–15 July 1962
Clay

Canada
0

			1	2	3	4	5
1	(United States) (Canada)	Chuck McKinley; François Godbout	6; 4	3; 6	6; 3	6; 4
2	(United States) (Canada)	Jon Douglas; Don Fontana	6; 4	6; 2	5; 7	6; 4
3	(United States) (Canada)	Chuck McKinley / Dennis Ralston; Don Fontana / François Godbout	11; 9	7; 5	6; 1
4	(United States) (Canada)	Chuck McKinley; Henry Fauquier	6; 3	6; 0	6; 2
5	(United States) (Canada)	Dennis Ralston; François Godbout	6; 2	9; 7	6; 4

== Semifinals ==
=== Mexico vs. United States ===
Mexico
3
Centro Deportivo Chapultepec, Mexico City, Mexico
4–6 August 1962
Clay

United States
2

			1	2	3	4	5
1	(Mexico) (United States)	Rafael Osuna; Chuck McKinley	2; 6	5; 7	3; 6
2	(Mexico) (United States)	Antonio Palafox; Jon Douglas	6; 3	6; 1	3; 6	7; 5
3	(Mexico) (United States)	Rafael Osuna / Antonio Palafox; Chuck McKinley / Dennis Ralston	8; 6	10; 12	3; 6	6; 3	6; 2
4	(Mexico) (United States)	Rafael Osuna; Jon Douglas	9; 7	6; 3	6; 8	3; 6	6; 1
5	(Mexico) (United States)	Mario Llamas; Chuck McKinley	6; 2	6; 4	5; 7	3; 6	3; 6

=== Caribbean/West Indies vs. Yugoslavia ===
Caribbean/West Indies
1
Port of Spain, Trinidad and Tobago
6–8 August 1962
Clay

Yugoslavia
4

			1	2	3	4	5
1	(Cricket West Indies) (Socialist Federal Republic of Yugoslavia)	Ian McDonald; Boro Jovanović	1; 6	1; 6	1; 6
2	(Cricket West Indies) (Socialist Federal Republic of Yugoslavia)	Peter Valdez; Nikola Pilić	2; 6	1; 6	0; 6
3	(Cricket West Indies) (Socialist Federal Republic of Yugoslavia)	Alan Price / Peter Valdez; Boro Jovanović / Nikola Pilić	2; 6	0; 6	1; 6
4	(Cricket West Indies) (Socialist Federal Republic of Yugoslavia)	Alan Price; Nikola Pilić	0; 6	2; 6	3; 6
5	(Cricket West Indies) (Socialist Federal Republic of Yugoslavia)	Peter Valdez; Boro Jovanović	2; 6	6; 4	4; 1			retired

== Final ==
=== Mexico vs. Yugoslavia ===
Mexico
4
Centro Deportivo Chapultepec, Mexico City, Mexico
17–19 August 1962
Clay

Yugoslavia
1

			1	2	3	4	5
1	(Mexico) (Socialist Federal Republic of Yugoslavia)	Antonio Palafox; Boro Jovanović	6; 4	1; 6	6; 3	6; 3
2	(Mexico) (Socialist Federal Republic of Yugoslavia)	Rafael Osuna; Nikola Pilić	6; 4	6; 4	6; 2
3	(Mexico) (Socialist Federal Republic of Yugoslavia)	Rafael Osuna / Antonio Palafox; Boro Jovanović / Nikola Pilić	6; 4	2; 6	6; 3	7; 5
4	(Mexico) (Socialist Federal Republic of Yugoslavia)	Francisco Contreras; Nikola Pilić	2; 6	2; 6	7; 9
5	(Mexico) (Socialist Federal Republic of Yugoslavia)	Mario Llamas; Vladimir Presečki	6; 0	6; 1	6; 1
