= 1963 Wimbledon Championships =

- Date: 24 June – 8 July (Note: The scheduled end date of the tournament was 6 July 1963.)
- Edition: 77th
- Category: Grand Slam
- Surface: Grass
- Location: Church Road; SW19, Wimbledon, London, United Kingdom
- Venue: All England Lawn Tennis and Croquet Club

Champions

Men's singles
- (United States) Chuck McKinley

Women's singles
- (Australia) Margaret Smith

Men's doubles
- (Mexico) Rafael Osuna / (Mexico) Antonio Palafox

Women's doubles
- (Brazil) Maria Bueno / (United States) Darlene Hard

Mixed doubles
- (Australia) Margaret Smith / (Australia) Ken Fletcher

Boys' singles
- (Greece) Nicholas Kalogeropoulos

Girls' singles
- (France) Monique Salfati
← 1962 ·	Wimbledon Championships	· 1964 →

The 1963 Wimbledon Championships took place on the outdoor grass courts at the All England Lawn Tennis and Croquet Club in Wimbledon, London, United Kingdom. It was the 77th staging of the Wimbledon Championships, and the third Grand Slam tennis event of 1963. The tournament which was scheduled from 24 June until 6 July was played in cold and wet weather conditions. Play on the final Saturday was cancelled due to rain and the women's singles, the men's and women's doubles and the mixed doubles finals were concluded on Monday, 8 July. This edition of the tournament saw the introduction of the regulation that player's clothing must be predominantly white.

== Champions ==
=== Seniors ===
==== Men's singles ====
(United States) Chuck McKinley defeated (Australia) Fred Stolle, 9–7, 6–1, 6–4

==== Women's singles ====
(Australia) Margaret Smith defeated (United States) Billie Jean Moffitt, 6–3, 6–4

==== Men's doubles ====
(Mexico) Rafael Osuna / (Mexico) Antonio Palafox defeated (France) Jean-Claude Barclay / (France) Pierre Darmon, 4–6, 6–2, 6–2, 6–2

==== Women's doubles ====
(Brazil) Maria Bueno / (United States) Darlene Hard defeated (Australia) Robyn Ebbern / (Australia) Margaret Smith, 8–6, 9–7

==== Mixed doubles ====
(Australia) Ken Fletcher / (Australia) Margaret Smith defeated (Australia) Bob Hewitt / (United States) Darlene Hard, 11–9, 6–4

=== Juniors ===
==== Boys' singles ====
(Greece) Nicholas Kalogeropoulos defeated (United Arab Republic) Ismail El Shafei, 6–4, 6–3

==== Girls' singles ====
(France) Monique Salfati defeated (Australia) Kaye Dening, 6–4, 6–1

== Notes ==
Preceded by 1963 French Championships	Grand Slams	Succeeded by 1963 U.S. National Championships
