= Houston City Championships =

Defunct tennis tournament
- Tour: ILTF World Circuit (1924–69) men (1924–70) women
- Founded: 1924; 101 years ago
- Abolished: 1970; 55 years ago
- Location: Houston, Texas, United States
- Venue: Memorial Park Tennis Center
- Surface: Hard / outdoor

The Houston City Championships was a men's and women's tennis tournament was founded in 1924. The tournament was first played at the Houston Municipal Tennis Courts in Memorial Park, Houston, Texas, United States. It ran annually until 1970.

== History ==
The tournament was first established in 1924 and was played in Memorial Park, Houston. The tournament was organised by the Houston Tennis Association (HTA), when it was part of the Texas Tennis Association. In 1951 the Houston Tennis Association it became a distinct independent organization. and was staged annually until 1970, when it ceased to be an individual competition as part of the ILTF World Circuit. The championships however are still being held as a localised multiple age group event.

== Finals ==
=== Men's Singles ===
(Incomplete roll)

Year	Champions	Runners-up	Score
1937	(United States) Wayne Sabin	(United States) Ernest Sutter	6–4, 4–6, 4–6, 6–0, 6–2.
1938	(United States) Wayne Sabin (2)	(United States) Bobby Riggs	6–2, 2–6, 6–2, 6–2.
1939	(United States) Ernest Sutter	(United States) Hal Surface	6–0, 6–3, 9–11, 6–3.
1948	(United States) Jason Morton	(United States) Glen Hewitt	6–2, 6–4, 6–3.
1953	(United States) Robert Lovelace	(United States) Charlie Russo	6–8, 7–5, 6–0, 6–0.
1954	(United States) Richard Schuette	(United States) Ronnie Sawyer	6–1, 6–0, 6–2.
1955	(United States) Richard Schuette (2)	(United States) John A. Been	6–4, 1–6, 11–9, 1–6, 6–1.
1956	(United States) Richard Schuette (3)	(United States) Ron Fisher	4–6, 6–1, 7–5, 7–5.
1966	(West Germany) Harald Elschenbroich	(United States) Mike Estep	7–5, 6–4.
1967	(Venezuela) Humphrey Hose	(United States) Mike Estep	6–4, 6–4.
1970	(United States) Terry Neudecker	(United States) Ron Fisher	6–4, 7–5.

=== Women's Singles ===
(Incomplete roll)

Year	Champions	Runners-up	Score
1937	(United States) Marjorie Gladman Van Ryn	(United States) Mary Greef Harris	6–4, 3–6, 6–2
1953	(United States) Peggy Startzman	(United States) Marilyn Montgomery	6–4, 6–4
1954	(United States) Ethel Norton	(United States) Gladys Heldman	7–5, 1–6, 6–2
1955	(United States) Betty Gray	(United States) Peggy Startzman	7–9, 8–6, 6–0
1962	(United States) Nancy Richey	(United States) Karen Susman	6–3, 6–3
1966	(United States) Carole Graebner	(South Africa) Esmé Emmanuel	7–5, 6–2
1970	(United States) Daryl Gralka	(United States) Becky Vest	3–6, 6–4, 6–4
