= 1962 Wimbledon Championships =

76th staging of the Wimbledon Championships

- Date: 25 June – 7 July
- Edition: 76th
- Category: Grand Slam
- Surface: Grass
- Location: Church Road; SW19, Wimbledon, London, United Kingdom
- Venue: All England Lawn Tennis and Croquet Club

Champions

Men's singles
- (Australia) Rod Laver

Women's singles
- (United States) Karen Susman

Men's doubles
- (Australia) Bob Hewitt / (Australia) Fred Stolle

Women's doubles
- (United States) Billie Jean Moffitt / (United States) Karen Susman

Mixed doubles
- (Australia) Neale Fraser / (United States) Margaret duPont

Boys' singles
- (United Kingdom) Stanley Matthews

Girls' singles
- (Soviet Union) Galina Baksheeva
← 1961 ·	Wimbledon Championships	· 1963 →

The 1962 Wimbledon Championships took place on the outdoor grass courts at the All England Lawn Tennis and Croquet Club in Wimbledon, London, United Kingdom. The tournament was held from Monday 25 June until Saturday 7 July 1962. It was the 76th staging of the Wimbledon Championships, and the third Grand Slam tennis event of 1962. Rod Laver and Karen Susman won the singles titles.

== Champions ==
=== Seniors ===
==== Men's singles ====
(Australia) Rod Laver defeated (Australia) Martin Mulligan, 6–2, 6–2, 6–1

==== Women's singles ====
(United States) Karen Susman defeated (Czechoslovakia) Věra Suková, 6–4, 6–4

==== Men's doubles ====
(Australia) Bob Hewitt / (Australia) Fred Stolle defeated (Socialist Federal Republic of Yugoslavia) Boro Jovanović / (Socialist Federal Republic of Yugoslavia) Nikola Pilić, 6–2, 5–7, 6–2, 6–4

==== Women's doubles ====
(United States) Billie Jean Moffitt / (United States) Karen Susman defeated (South Africa) Sandra Price / (South Africa) Renée Schuurman, 5–7, 6–3, 7–5

==== Mixed doubles ====
(Australia) Neale Fraser / (United States) Margaret duPont defeated (United States) Dennis Ralston / (United Kingdom) Ann Haydon, 2–6, 6–3, 13–11

=== Juniors ===
==== Boys' singles ====
(United Kingdom) Stanley Matthews defeated (Soviet Union) Alex Metreveli, 6–2, 6–4

==== Girls' singles ====
(Soviet Union) Galina Baksheeva defeated (New Zealand) Elizabeth Terry, 6–4, 6–2

Preceded by 1962 French Championships	Grand Slams	Succeeded by 1962 U.S. National Championships
