= Ned Neely =

American tennis player

- Full name: Edgar Adams Neely III
- Country (sports): United States
- Born: January 14, 1940
- Died: August 13, 1999 (aged 59)
- Plays: Right-handed

Grand Slam singles results
- French Open: 1R (1962)
- Wimbledon: 1R (1962, 1964)
- US Open: 3R (1963)

Edgar Adams Neely III (January 14, 1940 – August 13, 1999) was an American professional tennis player.

A native of Atlanta, Neely was the eldest son of attorney Edgar Neely Jr. He was the national under-15s boys' singles champion in 1955 and a two-time All-American collegiate player for Georgia Tech. One of his brothers, Mike, was also a good junior player, winning an Orange Bowl title in 1957.

Neely, ranked as high as 11th nationally, made the singles third round of the 1963 U.S. National Championships and competed in multiple editions of the Wimbledon Championships. He is an inductee in the Georgia Tech Hall of Fame, Georgia Tennis Hall of Fame and Southern Tennis Hall of Fame.

An attorney by profession, Neely received an engineering degree from Georgia Tech and went on to study law at the University of Virginia. He practiced law in Atlanta.

Neely, who was an experienced pilot, died in 1999 when a Beechcraft twin-engine plane he was piloting crashed near Wakulla County Airport, Florida. His 14-year-old daughter, the plane's only other occupant, survived the accident.
