= 1962 Wimbledon Championships – Boys' singles =

Boys' singles
- 1962 Wimbledon Championships

Final
- Champion: (United Kingdom) Stanley Matthews
- Runner-up: (Soviet Union) Alex Metreveli
- Score: 6–2, 6–4

Events
Singles	men	women		boys	girls
Doubles	men	women	mixed	boys	girls
← 1961 ·	Wimbledon Championships	· 1963 →

Stanley Matthews defeated Alex Metreveli in the final, 6–2, 6–4 to win the boys' singles tennis title at the 1962 Wimbledon Championships.

== Draw ==
=== Key ===
- Q = Qualifier
- WC = Wild card
- LL = Lucky loser
- Alt = Alternate
- SE = Special exempt
- PR = Protected ranking
- ITF = ITF entry
- JE = Junior exempt
- w/o = Walkover
- r = Retired
- d = Defaulted
- SR = Special ranking

=== Finals ===
Semifinals
(Austria) Ernst Blanke	4	1
(United Kingdom) Stanley Matthews	6	6
(United States) Dave Ranney	2	4
(Soviet Union) Alex Metreveli	6	6

Final
(United Kingdom) Stanley Matthews	6	6
(Soviet Union) Alex Metreveli	2	4

=== Top half ===
First round
(Denmark) Steen Søndergård	7	2
(Socialist Federal Republic of Yugoslavia) Nikola Špear	9	6
(India) Shyam Minotra	6	1	3
(Poland) Mieczysław Kubaty	1	6	6
(United Kingdom) Stanley Matthews	6	6
(Switzerland) P Holstein	2	4
(Indonesia) Sie Nie Sie	w/o
(Belgium) Gerald Kaisin
(United Arab Republic) Ismail El Shafei	5	0
(West Germany) Hans-Joachim Plötz	7	6

Second round
(Lebanon) Makram Alameddine	3	2
(Spain) José María Gisbert	6	6
(Austria) Ernst Blanke	3	6	6
(Socialist Federal Republic of Yugoslavia) N Špear	6	3	3
(Poland) M Kubaty	3	2
(United Kingdom) S Matthews	6	6
(Belgium) G Kaisin	1	7	6
(West Germany) H-J Plötz	6	5	8

Quarterfinals
(Spain) JM Gisbert	0^{r}
(Austria) E Blanke	2
(United Kingdom) S Matthews	4	7	7
(West Germany) H-J Plötz	6	5	5

Semifinals
(Austria) E Blanke	4	1
(United Kingdom) S Matthews	6	6

=== Bottom half ===
First round
(Finland) T Talasterae	1	1
(Sweden) V Axsaeter	6	6
(United States) Dave Ranney
(Philippines) J Gonzalez	w/o
(France) Patrice Beust	6	1	6
(Norway) Per Hegna	2	6	4
(South Africa) Rohan Summers	2	7	3
(Hungary) László Kovács	6	5	6

Second round
(Sweden) V Axsaeter	3	5
(United States) D Ranney	6	7
(France) P Beust	4	3
(Hungary) L Kovács	6	6
(Soviet Union) Alex Metreveli	2	6	6
(Republic of Ireland) Michael Rainey	6	2	4
(Monaco) Patrick Landau	7	1	1
(Kenya) M Sutton	5	6	6

Quarterfinals
(United States) D Ranney	9	6
(Hungary) L Kovács	7	2
(Soviet Union) A Metreveli	6	6
(Kenya) M Sutton	3	1

Semifinals
(United States) D Ranney	2	4
(Soviet Union) A Metreveli	6	6
