= 1963 Wimbledon Championships – Boys' singles =

Wimbledon 1963

Boys' singles
- 1963 Wimbledon Championships

Final
- Champion: (Greece) Nicholas Kalogeropoulos
- Runner-up: (United Arab Republic) Ismail El Shafei
- Score: 6–4, 6–3

Events
Singles	men	women		boys	girls
Doubles	men	women	mixed	boys	girls
← 1962 ·	Wimbledon Championships	· 1964 →

Nicholas Kalogeropoulos defeated Ismail El Shafei in the final, 6–4, 6–3 to win the boys' singles tennis title at the 1963 Wimbledon Championships.

== Draw ==
=== Key ===
- Q = Qualifier
- WC = Wild card
- LL = Lucky loser
- Alt = Alternate
- SE = Special exempt
- PR = Protected ranking
- ITF = ITF entry
- JE = Junior exempt
- w/o = Walkover
- r = Retired
- d = Defaulted
- SR = Special ranking

=== Finals ===
Semifinals
(Greece) Nicholas Kalogeropoulos	3	6	6
(Austria) Ernst Blanke	6	2	3
(United Arab Republic) Ismail El Shafei	2	6	6
(United Kingdom) Peter Curtis	6	0	1

Final
(Greece) Nicholas Kalogeropoulos	6	6
(United Arab Republic) Ismail El Shafei	4	3

=== Top half ===
First round
(Greece) Nicholas Kalogeropoulos	3	6	6
(Italy) Gaetano Di Maso	6	2	3
(Iran) Taghi Akbari	4	11	1
(Spain) José María Gisbert	6	9	6
(West Germany) Bernd Weinmann	6	6
(Belgium) Paul Grosjean	2	3
(Czechoslovakia) Štěpán Koudelka	6	5	6
(Norway) Per Hegna	3	7	2
(Socialist Federal Republic of Yugoslavia) Davor Štolcer	2	3
(Austria) Ernst Blanke	6	6
(Thailand) Felix Bautista	6	6
(Hong Kong) Jerry Sung	3	4

Second round
(Sweden) Ove Bengtson	0	6
(Hungary) Attila Korpás	6	7
(Greece) N Kalogeropoulos	4	10	6
(Spain) JM Gisbert	6	8	1
(West Germany) B Weinmann	4	4
(Czechoslovakia) Š Koudelka	6	6
(Austria) E Blanke	6	6
(Thailand) F Bautista	2	3

Quarterfinals
(Hungary) A Korpás	3	6
(Greece) N Kalogeropoulos	6	8
(Czechoslovakia) Š Koudelka	6	4	2
(Austria) E Blanke	4	6	6

Semifinals
(Greece) N Kalogeropoulos	3	6	6
(Austria) E Blanke	6	2	3

=== Bottom half ===
First round
(Denmark) Steen Søndergård	6	7
(Uganda) KPWJ McAdam	3	5
(Netherlands) B van Sleeten	0	3
(Poland) Tadeusz Nowicki	6	6
(United Arab Republic) Ismail El Shafei
(Republic of the Congo) JR Cadet	w/o
(Portugal) João Lagos	2	3
(India) Shyam Minotra	6	6
(Senegal) Y Smith	2	5
(United Kingdom) Peter Moores	6	7

Second round
(Denmark) S Søndergård	4	6	6
(Poland) T Nowicki	6	3	1
(United Arab Republic) I El Shafei	6	4	6
(India) S Minotra	4	6	4
(United Kingdom) P Moores	1	7
(United Kingdom) Peter Curtis	6	9
(Switzerland) Fred Berli	5	6	0
(Republic of Ireland) Frank McArdle	7	2	6

Quarterfinals
(Denmark) S Søndergård	1	1
(United Arab Republic) I El Shafei	6	6
(United Kingdom) P Curtis	6	6
(Republic of Ireland) F McArdle	0	4

Semifinals
(United Arab Republic) I El Shafei	2	6	6
(United Kingdom) P Curtis	6	0	1
