= 1963 Wimbledon Championships – Girls' singles =

Girls' singles
- 1963 Wimbledon Championships

Final
- Champion: (France) Monique Salfati
- Runner-up: (Australia) Kaye Dening
- Score: 6–4, 6–1

Details
- Draw: 14

Events
Singles	men	women		boys	girls
Doubles	men	women	mixed	boys	girls
← 1962 ·	Wimbledon Championships	· 1964 →

Monique Salfati defeated Kaye Dening in the final, 6–4, 6–1 to win the girls' singles tennis title at the 1963 Wimbledon Championships.

== Draw ==
=== Key ===
- Q = Qualifier
- WC = Wild card
- LL = Lucky loser
- Alt = Alternate
- SE = Special exempt
- PR = Protected ranking
- ITF = ITF entry
- JE = Junior exempt
- w/o = Walkover
- r = Retired
- d = Defaulted
- SR = Special ranking

=== Draw ===
First round
(Australia) Kaye Dening	6	6
(Austria) E Foeger	3	0
(West Germany) K Seltenreich	6	5	7
(Republic of Ireland) LM Croskery	2	7	5
(Belgium) Ingrid Loeys	1	3
(Norway) Kirsten Robsahm	6	5^{r}
(Netherlands) Betty Stöve	6	3	5
(United Kingdom) SM Veale	3	6	7
(France) Monique Salfati	6	6
(Denmark) Inge Nielsen	1	0
(Canada) Faye Urban	6	6
(Spain) Elisa Gisbert	0	2

Quarterfinals
(Poland) Danuta Wieczorek	0	1
(Australia) Kaye Dening	6	6
(West Germany) K Seltenreich	6	3	7
(Belgium) Ingrid Loeys	1	6	5
(United Kingdom) SM Veale	2	1
(France) Monique Salfati	6	6
(Canada) Faye Urban	4	6	6
(Switzerland) Anne-Marie Studer	6	2	1

Semifinals
(Australia) Kaye Dening	6	6
(West Germany) K Seltenreich	3	4
(France) Monique Salfati	6	6
(Canada) Faye Urban	4	3

Final
(Australia) Kaye Dening	4	1
(France) Monique Salfati	6	6
