= 1962 Wimbledon Championships – Girls' singles =

Girls' singles
- 1962 Wimbledon Championships

Final
- Champion: (Soviet Union) Galina Baksheeva
- Runner-up: (New Zealand) Elizabeth Terry
- Score: 6–4, 6–2

Details
- Draw: 18

Events
Singles	men	women		boys	girls
Doubles	men	women	mixed	boys	girls
← 1961 ·	Wimbledon Championships	· 1963 →

Galina Baksheeva successfully defended her title, defeating Elizabeth Terry in the final, 6–4, 6–2 to win the girls' singles tennis title at the 1962 Wimbledon Championships.

== Draw ==
=== Key ===
- Q = Qualifier
- WC = Wild card
- LL = Lucky loser
- Alt = Alternate
- SE = Special exempt
- PR = Protected ranking
- ITF = ITF entry
- JE = Junior exempt
- w/o = Walkover
- r = Retired
- d = Defaulted
- SR = Special ranking

=== Finals ===
Semifinals
(Soviet Union) Galina Baksheeva	6	6
(Denmark) Birgit Grage	4	1
(New Zealand) Elizabeth Terry	6	7	6
(United Kingdom) Sally Holdsworth	2	9	4

Final
(Soviet Union) Galina Baksheeva	6	6
(New Zealand) Elizabeth Terry	4	2

=== Top half ===
First round
(Sweden) E Hultkrantz	4	3
(Denmark) Birgit Grage	6	6

Second round
(Finland) Christina Lindström	2	1
(Netherlands) Anja Lepoutre	6	6
(Soviet Union) Galina Baksheeva	6	6
(Brazil) L Fineberg	1	2
(Indonesia) Lita Liem	w/o
(Poland) D Makulska
(Austria) R Leyrer	3	4
(Denmark) B Grage	6	6

Quarterfinals
(Netherlands) A Lepoutre	8	1	1
(Soviet Union) G Baksheeva	6	6	6
(Poland) D Makulska	6	1
(Denmark) B Grage	8	6

Semifinals
(Soviet Union) G Baksheeva	6	6
(Denmark) B Grage	4	1

=== Bottom half ===
First round
(Republic of Ireland) A Keegan	2	4
(New Zealand) Elizabeth Terry	6	6

Second round
(New Zealand) E Terry	6	6
(France) Françoise Courteix	4	2
(Belgium) O Jacob	8	6
(Switzerland) I Gubler	6	1
(British Guiana) J Franker	1	1
(United Kingdom) Sally Holdsworth	6	6
(Norway) Kirsten Robsahm	2	6	6
(Mexico) C Hawley	6	4	4

Quarterfinals
(New Zealand) E Terry	6	6
(Belgium) O Jacob	1	3
(United Kingdom) S Holdsworth	6	8
(Norway) K Robsahm	3	6

Semifinals
(New Zealand) E Terry	6	7	6
(United Kingdom) S Holdsworth	2	9	4
