= Evert Schneider =

Dutch tennis player

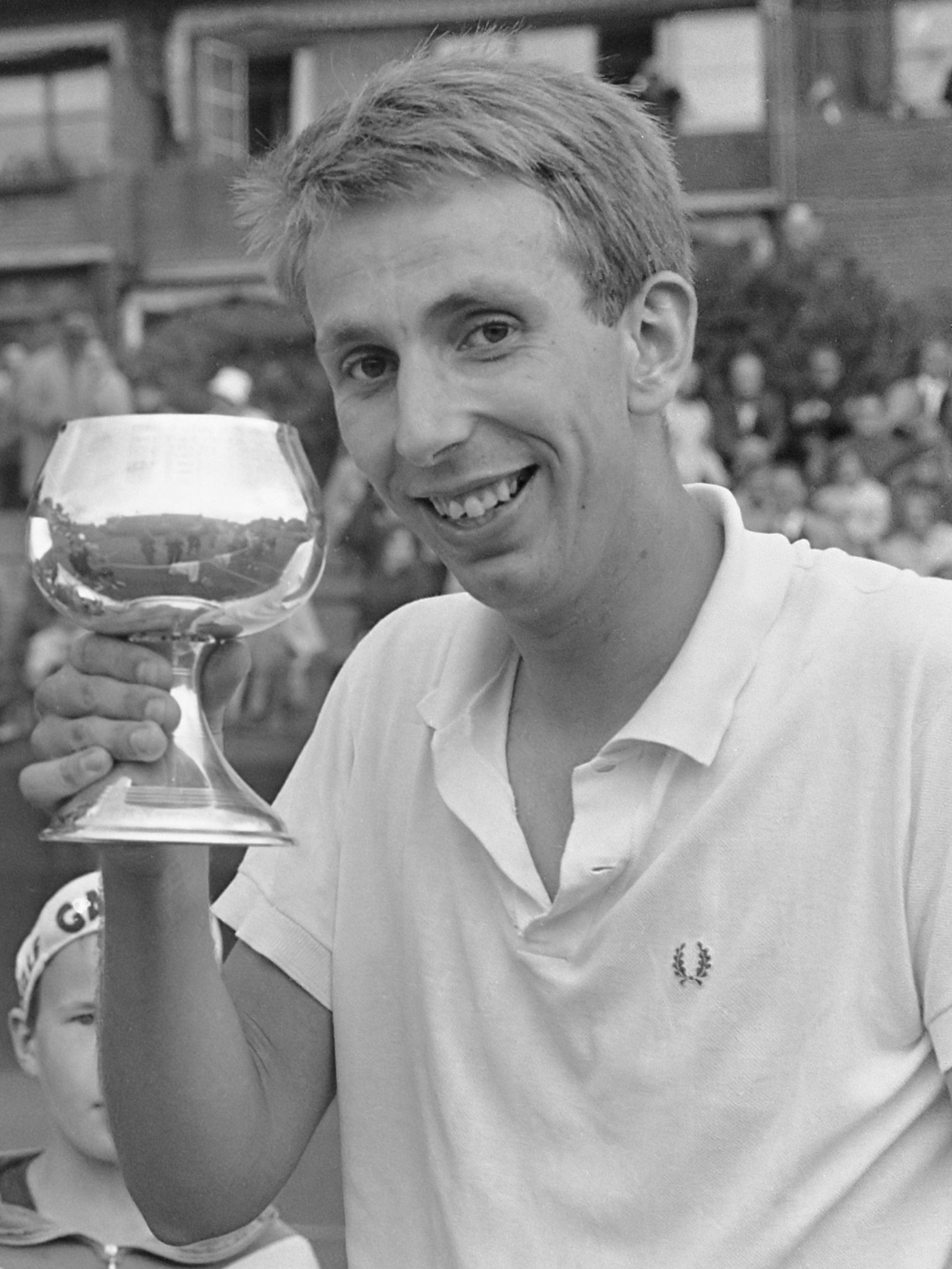
- Country (sports): Netherlands
- Born: 4 February 1942 (age 83)
- Plays: Right-handed

Singles

Grand Slam singles results
- US Open: 2R (1964)

Evert Schneider (born 4 February 1942) is a Dutch former tennis player.

Schneider is a native of The Hague and was a two-time national champion in doubles. In 1962 he represented the Netherlands in a Davis Cup tie against the Soviet Union in Scheveningen, featuring in both singles and doubles. He had a win over Ingo Buding to reach the second round of the 1964 U.S. National Championships.

== See also ==
- List of Netherlands Davis Cup team representatives
