= Tennis at the 1961 Summer Universiade =

Tennis events were contested at the 1961 Summer Universiade in Sofia, Bulgaria.

== Medal summary ==
| Event | Gold | Silver | Bronze |
|---|---|---|---|
| Men's singles | Boro Jovanović (YUG) | Nikola Pilić (YUG) | Ion Țiriac (ROU) |
| Men's doubles | Boro Jovanović and Nikola Pilić (YUG) | Fumio Akutagawa and Mitsuru Motoi (JPN) | Massimo Drisaldi and Stefano Gaudenzi (ITA) |
| Women's singles | Jitka Horcicková (TCH) | Zdenka Strachová (TCH) | Paula Virez-Vajda (HUN) |
| Women's doubles | Mina Illina and Julieta Namian (ROU) | Jitka Horcicková and Zdenka Strachová (TCH) | Györgyi Fehér and Paula Virez-Vajda (HUN) |
| Mixed doubles | Maria Teresa Riedl and Massimo Drisaldi (ITA) | Jitka Horcicková and Karol Safarik (TCH) | Mina Illina and Ion Țiriac (ROU) |

== Medal table ==
| Rank | Nation | Gold | Silver | Bronze | Total |
|---|---|---|---|---|---|
| 1 | Yugoslavia (YUG) | 2 | 1 | 0 | 3 |
| 2 | Czechoslovakia (TCH) | 1 | 3 | 0 | 4 |
| 3 | Romania (ROU) | 1 | 0 | 2 | 3 |
| 4 | Italy (ITA) | 1 | 0 | 1 | 2 |
| 5 | Japan (JPN) | 0 | 1 | 0 | 1 |
| 6 | Hungary (HUN) | 0 | 0 | 2 | 2 |
| Totals (6 entries) | | 5 | 5 | 5 | 15 |

== See also ==
- Tennis at the Summer Universiade
