= Ron Fisher (tennis) =

American tennis player

- Full name: Ronald W. Fisher
- Country (sports): United States
- Born: August 28, 1939 (age 85)

Singles

Grand Slam singles results
- Wimbledon: 1R (1963, 1964)
- US Open: 3R (1961)

Doubles

Grand Slam doubles results
- Wimbledon: 4R (1963)

Ronald W. Fisher (born August 28, 1939) is an American former tennis player.

Fisher, a player from Houston, played collegiate tennis for Rice University. An All-American for the Rice Owls, he was Southwest Conference singles and doubles champion in both 1958 and 1959. He made the singles third round of the 1961 U.S. National Championships and featured overseas at Wimbledon, reaching a doubles fourth round in 1963.

A mathematics graduate from Rice University, Fisher went on to work at IBM for 32-years and has served on the committee of USTA Texas. He is a member of Rice's Athletic Hall of Fame and the Texas Tennis Hall of Fame.
