= Reino Nyyssönen =

Finnish tennis player (1935–2023)

- Country (sports): Finland
- Born: 12 February 1935
- Died: January 2023 (aged 87)
- Plays: Right-handed

Singles

Grand Slam singles results
- Wimbledon: 2R (1960, 1962)
- US Open: 4R (1962)

Grand Slam mixed doubles results
- Wimbledon: QF (1961)

Reino Nyyssönen (12 February 1935 – January 2023) was a Finnish tennis player.

Nyyssönen was a native of Turku but it was in Sweden that he took up the sport of tennis, after coming to the country as a World War II child evacuee. When he returned to Finland he continued his tennis development in Kotka.

A Davis Cup player for Finland from 1955 to 1964, Nyyssönen won a total of 35 national championships, including six indoor and seven outdoor singles titles. Amongst his best grand slam performances, he made the mixed doubles quarter-finals at the 1961 Wimbledon Championships and the singles fourth round at the 1962 U.S. National Championships.

Nyyssönen was later the national tennis coach for Denmark.

== See also ==
- List of Finland Davis Cup team representatives
