= 1963 U.S. National Championships (tennis) =

- Date: 28 August – 8 September
- Edition: 83rd
- Category: Grand Slam (ITF)
- Surface: Grass
- Location: Forest Hills, Queens; New York City, New York
- Venue: West Side Tennis Club

Champions

Men's singles
- (Mexico) Rafael Osuna

Women's singles
- (Brazil) Maria Bueno

Men's doubles
- (United States) Chuck McKinley / (United States) Dennis Ralston

Women's doubles
- (Australia) Robyn Ebbern / (Australia) Margaret Smith

Mixed doubles
- (Australia) Margaret Smith / (Australia) Ken Fletcher
- U.S. National Championships

The 1963 U.S. National Championships (now known as the US Open) was a tennis tournament that took place on the outdoor grass courts at the West Side Tennis Club, Forest Hills in New York City, New York. The tournament ran from 28 August until 8 September. It was the 83rd staging of the U.S. National Championships, and the fourth Grand Slam tennis event of 1963.

== Finals ==
=== Men's singles ===
(Mexico) Rafael Osuna defeated (United States) Frank Froehling 7–5, 6–4, 6–2

=== Women's singles ===
(Brazil) Maria Bueno defeated (Australia) Margaret Smith 7–5, 6–4

=== Men's doubles ===
(United States) Chuck McKinley / (United States) Dennis Ralston defeated (Mexico) Rafael Osuna / (Mexico) Antonio Palafox 9–7, 4–6, 5–7, 6–3, 11–9

=== Women's doubles ===
(Australia) Robyn Ebbern / (Australia) Margaret Smith defeated (Brazil) Maria Bueno / (United States) Darlene Hard, 4–6, 10–8, 6–3

=== Mixed doubles ===
(Australia) Margaret Smith / (Australia) Ken Fletcher defeated (Australia) Judy Tegart / (United States) Ed Rubinoff 3–6, 8–6, 6–2

Preceded by 1963 Wimbledon Championships	Grand Slams	Succeeded by 1964 Australian Championships
