= 1962 U.S. National Championships (tennis) =

- Date: 29 August – 10 September
- Edition: 82nd
- Category: Grand Slam (ITF)
- Surface: Grass
- Location: Forest Hills, Queens; New York City, New York
- Venue: West Side Tennis Club

Champions

Men's singles
- (Australia) Rod Laver

Women's singles
- (Australia) Margaret Smith

Men's doubles
- (Mexico) Rafael Osuna / (Mexico) Antonio Palafox

Women's doubles
- (United States) Darlene Hard / (Brazil) Maria Bueno

Mixed doubles
- (Australia) Margaret Smith / (Australia) Fred Stolle
- U.S. National Championships

The 1962 U.S. National Championships (now known as the US Open) was a tennis tournament that took place on the outdoor grass courts at the West Side Tennis Club, Forest Hills in New York City, New York. The tournament ran from 29 August until 10 September. It was the 82nd staging of the U.S. National Championships, and the fourth Grand Slam tennis event of 1962. The men's singles event was won by Australian Rod Laver whose victory completed his first Grand Slam.

== Finals ==
=== Men's singles ===
(Australia) Rod Laver defeated (Australia) Roy Emerson 6–2, 6–4, 5–7, 6–4

=== Women's singles ===
(Australia) Margaret Smith defeated (United States) Darlene Hard 9–7, 6–4

=== Men's doubles ===
(Mexico) Rafael Osuna / (Mexico) Antonio Palafox defeated (United States) Chuck McKinley / (United States) Dennis Ralston 6–4, 10–12, 1–6, 9–7, 6–3

=== Women's doubles ===
(Brazil) Maria Bueno / (United States) Darlene Hard defeated (United States) Karen Hantze Susman / (United States) Billie Jean Moffitt, 4–6, 6–3, 6–2

=== Mixed doubles ===
(Australia) Margaret Smith / (Australia) Fred Stolle defeated (Australia) Lesley Turner / (United States) Frank Froehling 7–5, 6–2

Preceded by 1962 Wimbledon Championships	Grand Slams	Succeeded by 1963 Australian Championships
