= John Hillebrand =

Australian former tennis player

- Country (sports): Australia
- Born: c. 1940 (age 85–86) Rockhampton, Queensland, Australia

Grand Slam doubles results
- Australian Open: 4th (1963)

John Hillebrand (born c. 1940) is an Australian former tennis player who was active from the late 1950s until the early 1970s. His best finish in a Grand Slam tournament came in 1963, when he reached the men's doubles quarterfinals of the Australian Open with partner Peter McPherson.

== Tennis career ==
As a junior, Hillebrand won the Victorian Under 19 Clay Court Singles Championships three years in a row. Up until that time, it had only been done once, by Neale Fraser. Hillebrand also won the Tasmanian State Under 19 Singles Championships in 1957.

In the first round at Wimbledon in 1963, he defeated John Newcombe in five sets with the score 14–12, 9–7, 4–6, 4–6, 6–3. Arthur Ashe then defeated him 5–7, 7–5, 11–9, 3–6, 6–3 in the second round. In 1964, Hillebrand and partner Clive Brebnor reached the men's doubles final of the British Hard Court Championships, where they lost to Cliff Drysdale and Keith Diepraam in straight sets.

Hillebrand had wins either in singles or doubles against Frank Sedgman, Neale Fraser, Rex Hartwig, John Newcombe, Tony Roche, Paul McNamee, Peter McNamara, Bob Hewitt, Frew McMillan, and Jaroslav Drobny. He also has wins over Davis Cup players Mark Cox (GB), Roger Taylor (GB), Keith Diepraam (South Africa), Beppi Merlo (Italy), Pierre Barthes (Fr), Daniel Contet (Fr), Micah Dubitsky (Israel), Andres Licis (Poland), Christian Kuhnke (Germany), Juan Gisbert (Spain), and Nikki Pilic (Yugoslavia). Singles tournaments he won include Monte Carlo, Chapel Allerton, Sutton Coalfield, Eastbourne, Hoylake, St. Annes-On-Sea, and Israel. He won the Irish International Doubles Championship with Warren Jacques in 1961. After retirement as a player, Hillebrand captained the winning "A" pennant team of Liston/Esplanade to the Premiership of Melbourne, Victoria in 1966.

== Retirement ==
Hillebrand had played Dale Jensen in a London tournament in 1962. Upon arriving in California, he called Jensen and asked for help relocating to Southern California. Jensen arranged for him to immediately play a senior tournament in Costa Mesa, where he met Dr. Jim Pugh, a dentist and tennis player. They immediately became good friends. Pugh sponsored Hillebrand into the United States, and had him teach his son, Jim Pugh, age 10, who went on to become the top world ranked doubles player in 1989.

He also coached his wife (now ex) Charleen to 123 National US senior titles. He later became the director of the Australian School of Tennis in San Pedro, California.

In 1996, he self-published Tennis Secrets Revealed, a book exploring different theories of tennis play.

== Personal life ==
Hillebrand is also a songwriter whose hymn, God Will Guide You Home, was translated into the Cheyenne language (Tsisinstsistots). He is currently living in San Pedro, California.

He married fellow tennis player Charleen in 1964 and they have two daughters and one son. Hillebrand's father was the president of Australia's Professional Tennis Association in the 1960s and 1970s and oversaw the implementation of standards.
