= Barry Geraghty (tennis) =

Australian tennis player

- Country (sports): Australia
- Height: 6 ft 6 in (198 cm)

Singles

Grand Slam singles results
- Australian Open: 3R (1964)
- French Open: 1R (1962)
- Wimbledon: 2R (1963)

Barry Geraghty is an Australian former tennis player.

A tall 198 cm player from Bega, Geraghty made his main draw debut at the Australian Championships in 1962 and took Neale Fraser to five sets in a second round loss. He had an upset win over Davis Cup player Alan Mills at the 1962 British Hardcourts and also had a win over Roger Taylor during his career.
