= John Fraser (tennis) =

Australian tennis player (1935–2026)

- Full name: John Gavan Fraser
- Country (sports): Australia
- Born: 1 August 1935 Melbourne, Victoria, Australia
- Died: 14 February 2026 (aged 90) Melbourne, Victoria, Australia
- Turned pro: (amateur tour)
- Retired: 1968
- Plays: Right-handed (one-handed backhand)

Grand Slam singles results
- Australian Open: QF (1963)
- French Open: 3R (1962)
- Wimbledon: SF (1962)

Grand Slam doubles results
- Australian Open: QF (1958, 1961, 1962, 1968)

Grand Slam mixed doubles results
- Australian Open: QF (1963)

John Gavan Fraser OAM (1 August 1935 – 14 February 2026) was an Australian tennis player and medical doctor.

== Biography ==
Born in Melbourne, Victoria, Fraser attended St Kevin’s College 1943-1952 and then commenced studying medicine at Melbourne University graduating in 1958. He did three years at St Vincent's Hospital as a resident. In 1962, his brother, Neale, and John went on a world-wide tennis tour starting in Egypt and ending in Japan. Both brothers reached the semifinal of the Wimbledon singles with Neale losing to Rod Laver and John losing to his compatriot Martin Mulligan in three sets. Six of the quarterfinalists in the Wimbledon men's singles that year were Australians. Fraser reached the semifinal of the Wimbledon doubles, partnered with Rod Laver, losing to Fred Stolle and Bob Hewitt. He also reached the third round of the French men's singles losing to Pierre Darmon. In 1963 he reached the quarterfinal of the Australian Open losing to another Australian citizen Roy Emerson in straight sets. He was ranked No.8 in the 1963 Australian rankings. Ranked ahead of him were notable w players like Rod Laver, Roy Emerson, Neale Fraser, Fred Stolle, Ken Fletcher, Martin Mulligan and Bob Hewitt. He never achieved the fame of his brother Neale Fraser, a world and Wimbledon champion. John Fraser continued to play regularly in the Australian Open, but never played in any other grand slam championship.

In 1965, he was appointed the medical officer for the Fitzroy Football Club serving the club until 1982 and then he became the medical officer for the Carlton Football Club until 1990. He was the medical officer for the Australian Tennis Open from 1963 to 1998.

Fraser died in Melbourne on 14 February 2026, at the age of 90.
