= Thorvald Moe =

Norwegian tennis player, economist and civil servant

Thorvald Moe (born 4 October 1939) is a Norwegian former tennis player, economist and civil servant.

He was born in Oslo. He was appointed Director General (Norwegian: ekspedisjonssjef) in the Ministry of Finance from 1978 to 1986, from 1989 to 1997, and from 2002. He served as Norwegian ambassador to the Organisation for Economic Co-operation and Development (OECD) from 1986 to 1989, and vice secretary general of the OECD from 1998 to 2002.

He represented Bestum IF and won the national championship in tennis men's single in 1959, 1961, 1962 and 1967. He won a total of 38 senior titles in Norwegian championships (in single, double and mixed double), between 1959 and 1981. He competed at the 1962 Wimbledon Championships – Men's Singles, where he reached the third round.
