= Jacques Renavand =

French tennis player

- Country (sports): France
- Born: 12 November 1939 (age 85); Couhé-Vérac, France
- Plays: Right-handed

Singles
- Career record: 9–10

Grand Slam singles results
- French Open: 4R (1963)
- Wimbledon: 3R (1962)
- US Open: 3R (1962)

Jacques Renavand (born 12 November 1939) is a French former tennis player.

== Career ==
Renavand was active on tour in the late 1950s and early 1960s. He played for the France Davis Cup team in 1961 and 1962, with his appearances including a Europe Zone semi tie against Italy. In 1963 he made the fourth round of the French Championships, winning three successive five-set matches en route.

Retiring from tennis at the age of 24, Renavand went on to manage a famous nightclub in Paris called the Chez Castel.

== Personal life ==
Renavand's wife Isabelle is the daughter of former French Prime Minister Félix Gaillard. His two sons, Nicolas and Olivier, were professional tennis players.

== See also ==
- List of France Davis Cup team representatives
