= Alan Lane =

Australian tennis player

- Country (sports): Australia
- Born: 1938/1939
- Plays: Right-handed

Singles

Grand Slam singles results
- Australian Open: 3R (1962)
- French Open: 4R (1963)
- Wimbledon: 2R (1960, 1963)
- US Open: 3R (1961)

Alan Lane (born 1938/1939) is an Australian tennis player who competed on the world tour from 1959 to 1964.

Lane, who grew up in Adelaide, made the singles fourth round of the 1963 French Championships and won several international tournaments. These titles include Israel's Passover championships and the Chilean championships in Santiago. He served as the coach of both Portugal and Israel in the Davis Cup. During the 1970s he relocated to the United States and worked as a teaching pro, but in his later years has been living in Far North Queensland.
