= Eduardo Soriano =

Argentine tennis player (born 1936)

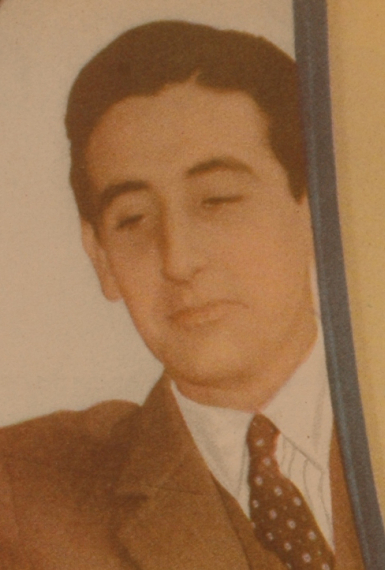
- Eduardo Soriano
- Country (sports): Argentina
- Born: 13 October 1936 (age 88); Buenos Aires, Argentina

Eduardo Soriano (born 13 October 1936) is an Argentine former tennis player.

Soriano was born in Buenos Aires on 13 October 1936. Soriano participated in the Davis Cup, representing his country in the 1950s and the 1960s. He played a total of 32 matches (20 singles matches and 12 doubles) and his best match is considered the five-set match (last set 14/12) in the 1966 Davis Cup when Roberto Aubone and he won, defeating players Marcello Lara and Rafael Osuna from Mexico.
