= Boro Jovanović =

Yugoslav tennis player (1939–2023)

- Country (sports): Yugoslavia
- Born: 21 October 1939 Zagreb, Yugoslavia
- Died: 19 December 2023 (aged 84) Zagreb, Croatia
- Height: 1.75 m (5 ft 9 in)
- Turned pro: 1972 (amateur from 1959)
- Retired: 1974
- Plays: Right-handed

Singles
- Highest ranking: No. 8 (1963, Lance Tingay)

Grand Slam singles results
- Australian Open: 2R (1962)
- French Open: QF (1968)
- Wimbledon: 2R (1959, 1960, 1963)
- US Open: 1R (1962, 1965)

Doubles

Grand Slam doubles results
- Australian Open: 2R (1962)
- Wimbledon: F (1962)

Grand Slam mixed doubles results
- Wimbledon: QF (1963)

Team competitions
- Davis Cup: F^{Am} (1962)
Medal record
Tennis
Representing Yugoslavia
Mediterranean Games
Gold medal – first place	1963 Naples	Doubles
Bronze medal – third place	1963 Naples	Singles
Summer Universiade
Gold medal – first place	1961 Sofia	Singles
Gold medal – first place	1961 Sofia	Doubles

Boro Jovanović (21 October 1939 – 19 December 2023) was a Yugoslav and Croatian tennis player. Jovanović was runner-up in the 1962 Wimbledon doubles tournament with Nikola Pilić, and quarter-finalist in the 1968 Wimbledon doubles tournament. In singles, Jovanović reached the final of the 1963 Italian Open and the quarterfinals of the 1968 French Open. In 1972, Boro Jovanović joined the World Championship Tennis Tour. He was ranked World No. 8 for 1963 by Lance Tingay of The Daily Telegraph. Jovanović died on 19 December 2023, at the age of 84.

== Grand Slam finals ==
=== Doubles: ( 1 runner-up) ===
Result	Year	Championship	Surface	Partner	Opponents	Score
Loss	1962	Wimbledon	Grass	(Socialist Federal Republic of Yugoslavia) Niki Pilić	(Australia) Bob Hewitt (Australia) Fred Stolle	2–6, 7–5, 2–6, 4–6
