= Dennis Ralston =

American tennis player (1942–2020)

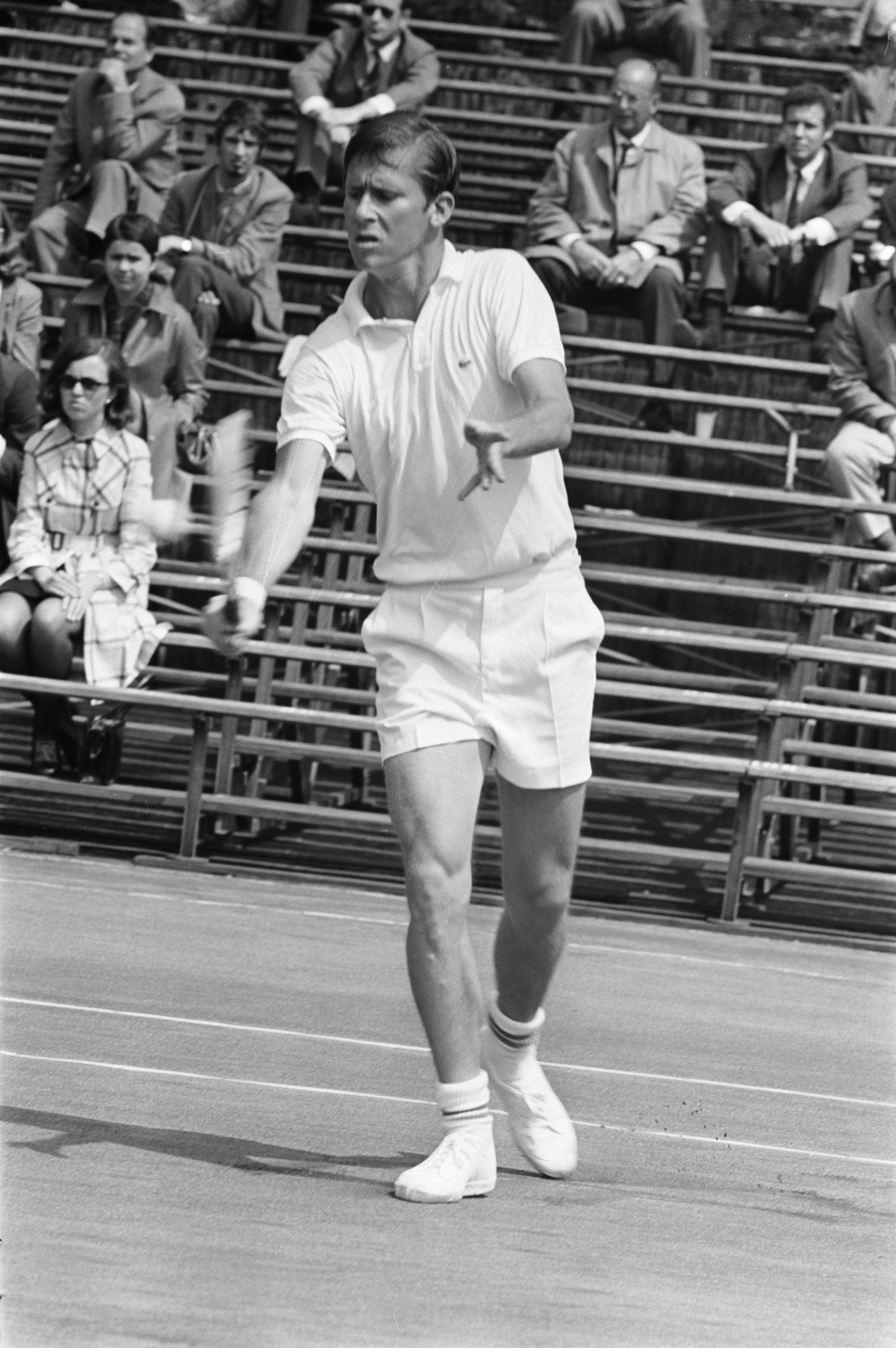
- Full name: Richard Dennis Ralston
- Country (sports): United States
- Born: July 27, 1942 Bakersfield, California, US
- Died: December 6, 2020 (aged 78) Austin, Texas, US
- Height: 6 ft 2 in (1.88 m)
- Turned pro: 1967 (amateur from 1958)
- Retired: 1977
- Plays: Right-handed (one-handed backhand)
- Int. Tennis HoF: 1987 (member page)

Singles
- Career record: 576–251 (69.6%)
- Career titles: 41
- Highest ranking: No. 5 (1966, Lance Tingay)

Grand Slam singles results
- Australian Open: SF (1970)
- French Open: 4R (1966)
- Wimbledon: F (1966)
- US Open: SF (1960)

Other tournaments
- Professional majors
- US Pro: SF (1968)
- Wembley Pro: QF (1967, 1968)
- French Pro: 2R (1968)

Doubles
- Career record: 125–87
- Career titles: 3 (Open Era)

Grand Slam doubles results
- Australian Open: SF (1971)
- French Open: W (1966)
- Wimbledon: W (1960)
- US Open: W (1961, 1962, 1963)

Grand Slam mixed doubles results
- Wimbledon: F (1962, 1966)
- US Open: F (1969)

Richard Dennis Ralston (July 27, 1942 – December 6, 2020) was an American professional tennis player whose active career spanned the 1960s and 1970s.

As a young player, he was coached by tennis pro Pancho Gonzales. He attended the University of Southern California (USC) and won NCAA championships under its coach George Toley. He and partner Bill Bond captured the NCAA doubles title in 1964. He was the highest-ranked American player at the end of three consecutive years in the 1960s; Lance Tingay of The Daily Telegraph ranked him as high as world No. 5 in 1966 (Ralston was ranked world no. 3 by the magazine Reading Eagle in 1963).

His best result at a Grand Slam singles event came in 1966 when he was seeded sixth and reached the final of the Wimbledon Championships, which he lost to fourth-seeded Manuel Santana in straight sets. At the end of that year he turned professional.

Ralston was a member of the Handsome Eight, the initial group of players signed to the professional World Championship Tennis tour. He won 27 national doubles and singles titles, including five grand-slam doubles crowns.

Ralston, a Davis Cup winner with the US Davis Cup team in 1963, continued to serve in the team as a coach from 1968 to 1971 and as a captain from 1972 to 1975, winning the title in 1972 over Romania.

Ralston was the men's coach at Southern Methodist University between 1981–89 and 1991–93 (split when he helped Noah in 1989–90), being named the NCAA Coach of the Year in 1983, when SMU finished second nationally.

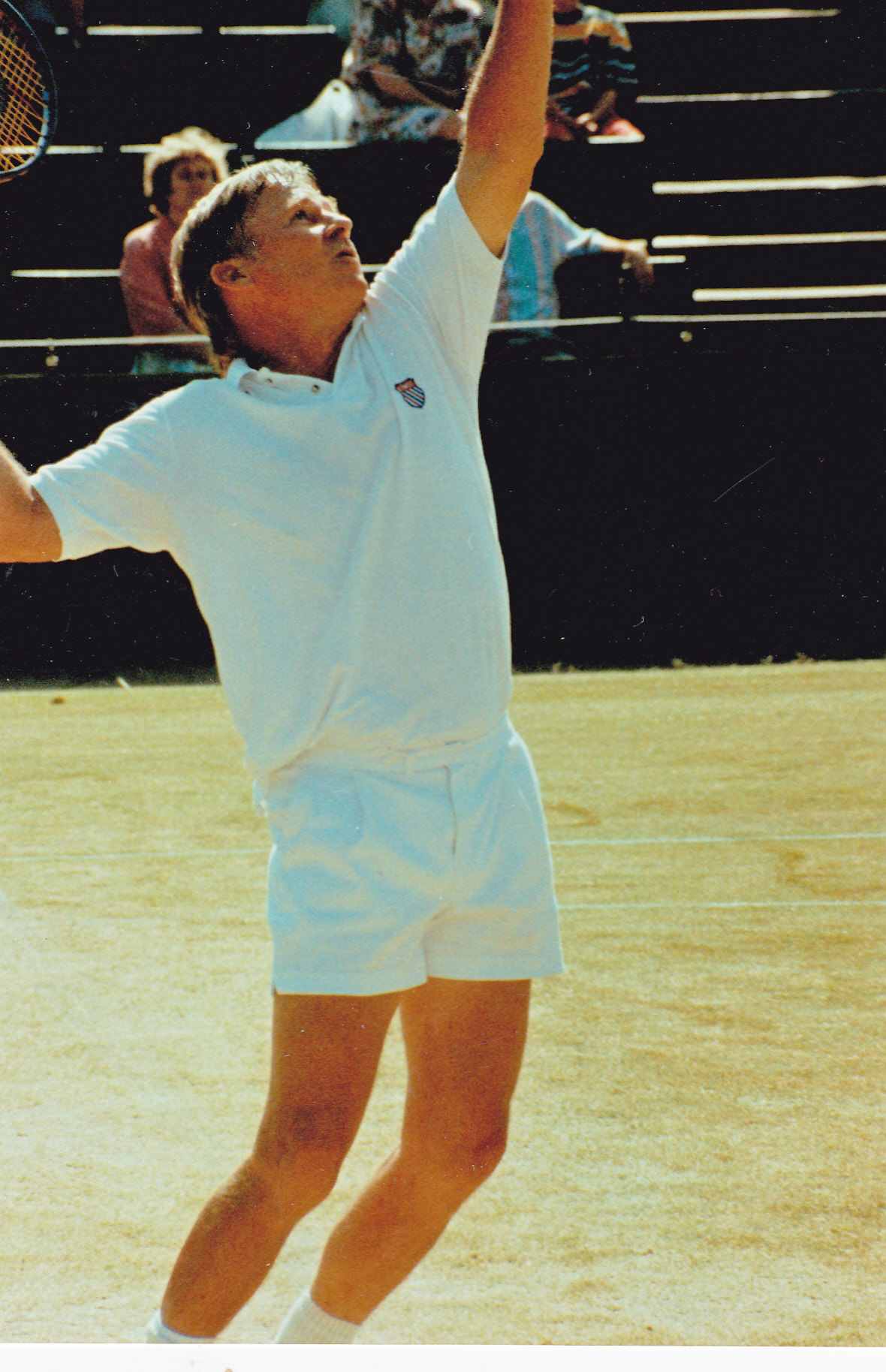
Dennis Ralston, Wimbledon, circa 1987

Ralston was inducted into the International Tennis Hall of Fame in 1987. In 2016, he was inducted into the Texas Tennis Hall of Fame.

== Grand Slam finals ==
=== Singles, 1 final (1 runner-up) ===
Result	Year	Championship	Surface	Opponent	Score
Loss	1966	Wimbledon	Grass	(Spain) Manuel Santana	4–6, 9–11, 4–6

=== Doubles, 9 finals (5 titles, 4 runners-up) ===
Result	Year	Championship	Surface	Partner	Opponents	Score
Win	1960	Wimbledon	Grass	(Mexico) Rafael Osuna	(United Kingdom) Mike Davies (United Kingdom) Bobby Wilson	7–5, 6–3, 10–8
Win	1961	U.S. Championships	Grass	(United States) Chuck McKinley	(Mexico) Rafael Osuna (Mexico) Antonio Palafox	6–3, 6–4, 2–6, 13–11
Loss	1962	U.S. Championships	Grass	(United States) Chuck McKinley	(Mexico) Rafael Osuna (Mexico) Antonio Palafox	4–6, 12–10, 6–1, 7–9, 3–6
Win	1963	U.S. Championships	Grass	(United States) Chuck McKinley	(Mexico) Rafael Osuna (Mexico) Antonio Palafox	9–7, 4–6, 5–7, 6–3, 11–9
Win	1964	U.S. Championships	Grass	(United States) Chuck McKinley	(United Kingdom) Mike Sangster (United Kingdom) Graham Stilwell	6–3, 6–2, 6–4
Win	1966	French Championships	Clay	(United States) Clark Graebner	(Romania) Ilie Năstase (Romania) Ion Țiriac	6–3, 6–3, 6–0
Loss	1966	U.S. Championships	Grass	(United States) Clark Graebner	(Australia) Roy Emerson (Australia) Fred Stolle	4–6, 4–6, 4–6
Loss	1969	US Open	Grass	(United States) Charlie Pasarell	(Australia) Ken Rosewall (Australia) Fred Stolle	6–2, 5–7, 11–13, 3–6
Loss	1971	Wimbledon	Grass	(United States) Arthur Ashe	(Australia) Roy Emerson (Australia) Rod Laver	6–4, 7–9, 8–6, 4–6, 4–6

=== Mixed doubles, 4 finals (4 runners-up) ===
Result	Year	Championship	Surface	Partner	Opponents	Score
Loss	1961	U.S. Championships	Grass	(United States) Darlene Hard	(Australia) Margaret Smith (Australia) Bob Mark	default
Loss	1962	Wimbledon	Grass	(United Kingdom) Ann Haydon	(United States) Margaret Osborne duPont (Australia) Neale Fraser	6–2, 3–6, 11–13
Loss	1966	Wimbledon	Grass	(United States) Billie Jean King	(Australia) Margaret Smith Court (Australia) Ken Fletcher	6–4, 3–6, 3–6
Loss	1969	US Open	Grass	(France) Françoise Dürr	(Australia) Margaret Court (United States) Marty Riessen	4–6, 5–7

== Grand Slam tournament performance timeline ==
Key
W	F	SF	QF	#R	RR	Q#	DNQ	A	NH

(W) winner; (F) finalist; (SF) semifinalist; (QF) quarterfinalist; (#R) rounds 4, 3, 2, 1; (RR) round-robin stage; (Q#) qualification round; (DNQ) did not qualify; (A) absent; (NH) not held; (SR) strike rate (events won / competed); (W–L) win–loss record.

=== Singles ===
Tournament	1958	1959	1960	1961	1962	1963	1964	1965	1966	1967	1968	1969	1970	1971	1972	1973	1974	1975	1976	1977		SR
Australian Open	A	A	A	A	A	A	A	A	A	A	A	A	SF	3R	A	A	A	A	A	A	A	0 / 2
French Open	A	A	A	A	A	A	A	A	4R	A	A	3R	A	A	A	A	A	A	A	A		0 / 2
Wimbledon	A	A	2R	3R	3R	2R	1R	SF	F	A	QF	4R	4R	3R	A	A	1R	A	A	2R		0 / 13
US Open	1R	1R	SF	A	1R	QF	QF	QF	4R	A	QF	4R	QF	2R	A	A	A	1R	A	A		0 / 13
Strike rate	0 / 1	0 / 1	0 / 2	0 / 1	0 / 2	0 / 2	0 / 2	0 / 2	0 / 3	0 / 0	0 / 2	0 / 3	0 / 3	0 / 3	0 / 0	0 / 0	0 / 1	0 / 1	0 / 0	0 / 1		0 / 30

Note: The Australian Open was held twice in 1977, in January and December.
