= Sergei Likhachev =

Soviet-Azerbaijani tennis player and coach

- Country (sports): Soviet Union
- Born: 20 March 1940; Baku, Azerbaijan SSR
- Died: 18 October 2016 (aged 76); Moscow, Russia

Singles
- Career record: 6–18
- Highest ranking: No. 194 (3 June 1974)

Grand Slam singles results
- French Open: 3R (1967)
- Wimbledon: 4R (1967)
- US Open: 1R (1962)

Doubles
- Career record: 29–19
- Career titles: 1

Sergei Likhachev (20 March 1940 — 18 October 2016) was a Soviet tennis player and tennis coach. He competed in the Davis Cup from 1962 to 1973.
