= Chuck McKinley =

American tennis player (1941–1986)

- Full name: Charles Robert McKinley Jr.
- Country (sports): United States
- Born: January 5, 1941 St. Louis, Missouri, U.S.
- Died: August 11, 1986 (aged 45) Dallas, Texas, U.S.
- Height: 5 ft 8 in (1.73 m)
- Turned pro: 1956 (amateur tour)
- Retired: 1969
- Plays: Right-handed (one-handed backhand)
- Int. Tennis HoF: 1986 (member page)

Singles
- Career record: 358-130
- Career titles: 28
- Highest ranking: No. 1 (1963, Ned Potter)

Grand Slam singles results
- Wimbledon: W (1963)
- US Open: SF (1962, 1963, 1964)

Doubles
- Career record: 4–12

Grand Slam doubles results
- Wimbledon: QF (1961, 1962, 1964)
- US Open: W (1961, 1963, 1964)

Team competitions
- Davis Cup: W (1963)

Charles Robert McKinley Jr. (January 5, 1941 – August 11, 1986) was an American men's amateur tennis champion of the 1960s, who was at one time rated the best in the world by many experts. He is remembered as an undersized, hard-working dynamo, whose relentless effort and competitive spirit led American tennis to the top of the sport during a period heavily dominated by Australians.

McKinley won the 1963 Men's Singles Championship at Wimbledon. At the end of 1963, McKinley was ranked world No. 1 amateur by Ned Potter and an Ulrich Kaiser panel of 13 experts. He paired with Dennis Ralston to win the 1963 Davis Cup, the only interruption in eight unbroken years of Australian dominance. He also paired with Ralston to win the U.S. Men's Doubles championships in 1961, 1963, and 1964.

== Biography ==
McKinley was born in St. Louis, Missouri, the son of a local pipe fitter, and grew up in a 'rough neighborhood' on the north side of town. As a boy, McKinley used to drop by the local YMCA where he was taught table tennis by volunteer instructor Bill Price. Eventually Price, who was also a tennis professional, took McKinley and some of the other boys to the public tennis courts. McKinley soon became so good that Price advised him to quit all other sports and concentrate on tennis.

In 1960 McKinley enrolled at Trinity University where he joined Frank Froehling, another leading American player, under the tutelage of coach Clarence Mabry, who also coached John Newcombe and other professionals. This gave Trinity arguably the best collegiate men's tennis team in the U.S. However, during this period Trinity never won the NCAA championship because the NCAA scheduled the championship tournament opposite Wimbledon, and both McKinley and Froehling chose to participate in Wimbledon rather than the collegiate tournament.

McKinley's decision to play Wimbledon was justified when in 1961, as a college sophomore, he reached the Wimbledon singles finals in which he was defeated by Rod Laver in straight sets. The same year, he won the singles title at the Eastern Grass Court Championships in South Orange against Frank Froehling. He won the U.S. Men's Clay Court Championships in 1962 and 1963, defeating Fred Stolle and Dennis Ralston in the respective finals. In 1962 and 1964, McKinley was victorious in the singles event at the U.S. National Indoor Championships.

His intense desire to win, his habit of screaming, "Oh Charley, you missed that one," at himself after a bad shot, and the fact that he drew a four-month suspension for heaving his tennis racket into the crowd at a Davis Cup match, gave him the reputation of the 'bad boy of international tennis.'

In 1963, with Laver in the professional ranks, McKinley won Wimbledon without losing a set. (Note: McKinley is to date one of only five men who have won the Wimbledon singles title without dropping a set, the others being Don Budge (1938), Tony Trabert (1955), Björn Borg (1976) and Roger Federer (2017).) He was helped in this by the fact that favorite Roy Emerson was eliminated by little known German Wilhelm Bungert. After McKinley eliminated Bungert, the press asked the German if he had been tired. “I was tired,” said Bungert, "Tired from those five set matches earlier. And tired from watching McKinley run." According to Time, McKinley played the tournament "with an astounding lack of grace. He leaps, he lunges, he scrambles, he slides, he falls, he dives, he skins his elbows and knees, and he flails at the ball as if he were clubbing a rat. His nerves are as taut as the strings of his racket." In the final, McKinley met Fred Stolle who had beaten McKinley four out of six previous meetings. However, Stolle said "He knocked it down my throat...In the end, I didn't know where to serve or what he was going to do."

In December 1963, McKinley and Dennis Ralston played all of the matches for the U.S. in winning the Davis Cup from Australia. The Australians had not lost the cup for four years and did not relinquish it again for another four. In the decisive match, McKinley defeated a young John Newcombe, who was 19 at the time.

After graduation from Trinity, McKinley chose not to go into professional tennis, and he became a stockbroker in New York City. He died in 1986 in Dallas, Texas of a brain tumor at the age of 45. McKinley has been elected to the Trinity University Hall of Fame and to the International Tennis Hall of Fame.

The tennis courts at Pattonville High School in Maryland Heights, Missouri, the school he attended, are named after him.

== Playing style ==
McKinley was not tall. He stood 5'8” and weighed 160 pounds. McKinley did not use off speed shots but relied instead on a power game. According to a Sports Illustrated, “Not in years has an American fledgling combined so much box-office appeal with so much pure ability – or crashed the tight little world of big-time tennis with so much confidence. 'If I didn't think I could be the best tennis player in the world,' Chuck McKinley says, 'I don't think I'd want to play.'" Bill Talbert described the young McKinley by saying, "There is nothing he can't do on the court. He has all the strokes. He's fast. He's strong. He has marvelous reflexes. He has the eyes of a hawk—sees the ball as well as anyone in the game."

== Grand Slam finals ==
=== Singles (1 title, 1 runner-up) ===
Result	Year	Championship	Surface	Opponent	Score
Loss	1961	Wimbledon	Grass	(Australia) Rod Laver	3–6, 1–6, 4–6
Win	1963	Wimbledon	Grass	(Australia) Fred Stolle	9–7, 6–1, 6–4

=== Doubles (3 titles, 1 runner-up) ===
Result	Year	Championship	Surface	Partner	Opponents	Score
Win	1961	U.S. Championships	Grass	(United States) Dennis Ralston	(Mexico) Rafael Osuna (Mexico) Antonio Palafox	6–3, 6–4, 2–6, 13–11
Loss	1962	U.S. Championships	Grass	(United States) Dennis Ralston	(Mexico) Rafael Osuna (Mexico) Antonio Palafox	4–6, 12–10, 6–1, 7–9, 3–6
Win	1963	U.S. Championships	Grass	(United States) Dennis Ralston	(Mexico) Rafael Osuna (Mexico) Antonio Palafox	9–7, 4–6, 5–7, 6–3, 11–9
Win	1964	U.S. Championships	Grass	(United States) Dennis Ralston	(United Kingdom) Mike Sangster (United Kingdom) Graham Stilwell	6–3, 6–2, 6–4

== Grand Slam tournament performance timeline ==
Key
W	F	SF	QF	#R	RR	Q#	DNQ	A	NH

(W) winner; (F) finalist; (SF) semifinalist; (QF) quarterfinalist; (#R) rounds 4, 3, 2, 1; (RR) round-robin stage; (Q#) qualification round; (DNQ) did not qualify; (A) absent; (NH) not held; (SR) strike rate (events won / competed); (W–L) win–loss record.

=== Singles ===
Tournament	1957	1958	1959	1960	1961	1962	1963	1964	1965	1966	1967	1968	1969	SR
Australian Open	A	A	A	A	A	A	A	A	A	A	A	A	A	0 / 0
French Open	A	A	A	A	A	A	A	A	A	A	A	A	A	0 / 0
Wimbledon	A	A	A	2R	F	2R	W	SF	A	A	A	A	A	1 / 5
US Open	2R	2R	4R	QF	3R	SF	SF	SF	4R	4R	1R	3R	1R	0 / 13
Strike rate	0 / 1	0 / 1	0 / 1	0 / 2	0 / 2	0 / 2	1 / 2	0 / 2	0 / 1	0 / 1	0 / 1	0 / 1	0 / 1	1 / 18
