= Christian Kuhnke =

German tennis player

- Country (sports): West Germany
- Born: 13 April 1939 (age 87) Berlin, Nazi Germany
- Turned pro: 1959 (amateur tour)
- Retired: 1974
- Plays: Left-handed

Singles
- Career record: 38–31
- Career titles: 2
- Highest ranking: No. 8 (1964, Lance Tingay)

Grand Slam singles results
- Australian Open: QF (1961)
- French Open: 4R (1963)
- Wimbledon: QF (1963, 1964)

Doubles
- Career record: 6–12

Grand Slam doubles results
- Australian Open: SF (1961)
- French Open: F (1962)
- Wimbledon: QF (1964)

Team competitions
- Davis Cup: F (1970^{Ch})

Christian Kuhnke (born 14 April 1939) is a former German tennis player.

Kuhnke was part of the West Germany Davis Cup team who reached the Challenge Round in the 1970 Davis Cup. Kuhnke reached the quarter finals of the Australian Championships in 1961. Kuhnke was a quarterfinalist at Wimbledon in 1963, losing in straight sets to Manuel Santana. The following year at Wimbledon, Kuhnke beat Santana (who had recently won the French Championships). Kuhnke, "a tall and solemn German left-hander", was "a pretty good volleyer with a long reach and a good deal of force and reliability in service" and was the kind of opponent that "bored" Santana. Kuhnke lost in the quarter finals to Fred Stolle.

Kuhnke was ranked World No. 8 for 1964 by Lance Tingay of The Daily Telegraph. In 1970 he won the Kingston International Championships against Gerald Battrick. He also won the title at Berlin in 1971 over Santana. He retired in 1974.

== Grand Slam finals ==
=== Doubles (1 runner–up) ===
Result	Year	Championship	Surface	Partner	Opponent	Score
Loss	1962	French Championships	Clay	(West Germany) Wilhelm Bungert	(Australia) Roy Emerson (Australia) Neale Fraser	3–6, 4–6, 5–7
