= Nikola Pilić =

Croatian tennis player (1939–2025)

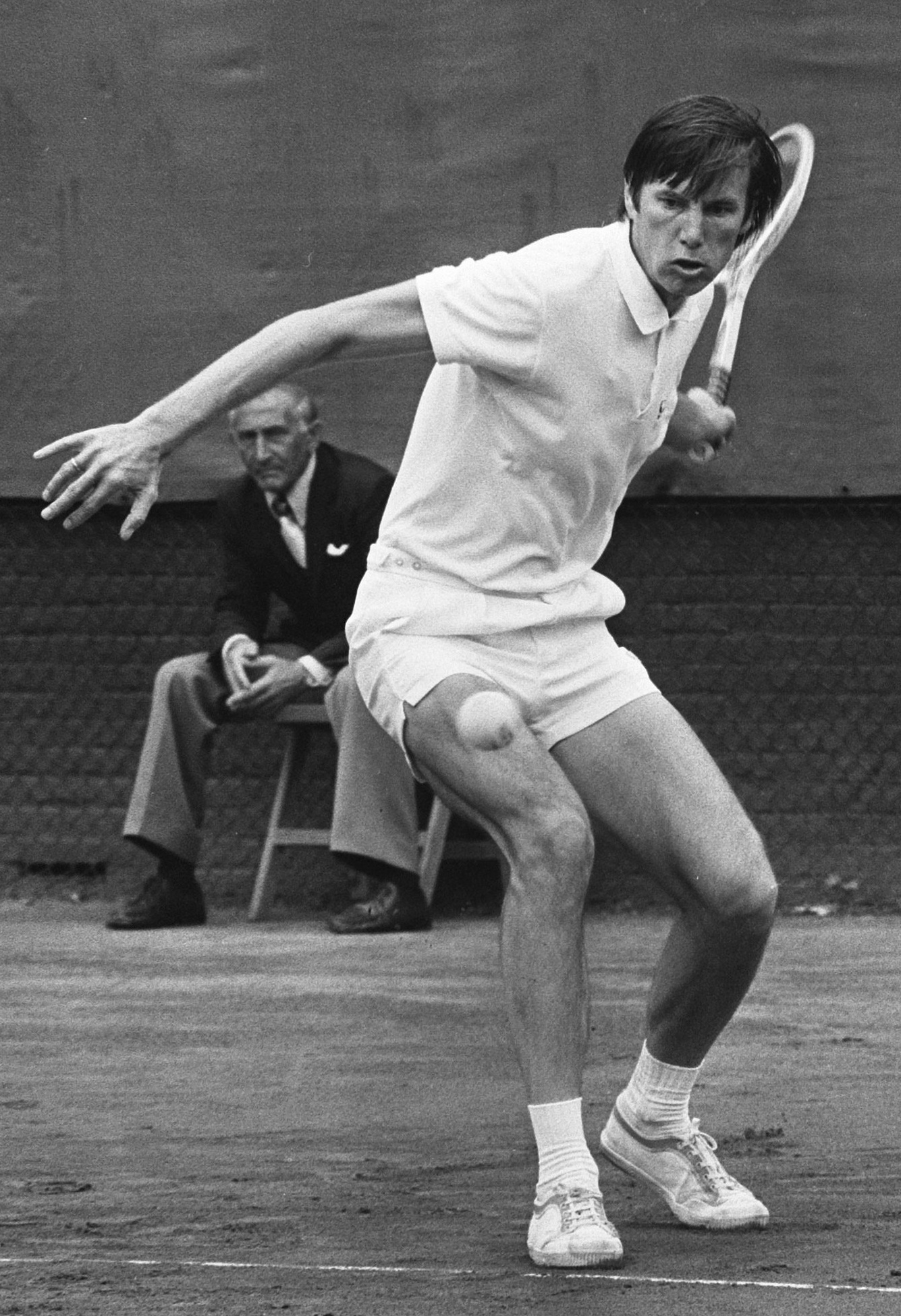
- Pilić at the 1975 Dutch Open
- Country (sports): Yugoslavia
- Born: 27 August 1939 Split, Banovina of Croatia, Kingdom of Yugoslavia
- Died: 23 September 2025 (aged 86) Rijeka, Croatia
- Height: 1.91 m (6 ft 3 in)
- Turned pro: 1968 (amateur tour from 1960)
- Retired: 1978
- Plays: Left-handed (one-handed backhand)

Singles
- Career record: 270–201
- Career titles: 9
- Highest ranking: No. 6 (1968, Lance Tingay)

Grand Slam singles results
- Australian Open: 3R (1970)
- French Open: F (1973)
- Wimbledon: SF (1967)
- US Open: QF (1973)

Other tournaments
- Professional majors
- US Pro: QF (1968)
- Wembley Pro: QF (1968)
- French Pro: QF (1968)

Doubles
- Career record: 143–134 (Open era)
- Career titles: 6

Grand Slam doubles results
- Australian Open: QF (1970)
- French Open: 4R (1969, 1976–77)
- Wimbledon: F (1962)
- US Open: W (1970)
Medal record
Representing Yugoslavia
Tennis
Mediterranean Games
Gold medal – first place	1963 Naples	Doubles
Bronze medal – third place	1963 Naples	Singles
Universiade
Gold medal – first place	1961 Sofia	Doubles
Silver medal – second place	1961 Sofia	Singles

Nikola Pilić (27 August 1939 – 23 September 2025) was a Croatian professional tennis player who competed for SFR Yugoslavia. He was the coach of the Croatian, West German and Serbian national tennis teams, with whom he won several Davis Cup titles. He participated in the founding of the Association of Tennis Professionals (ATP) and the professionalization of tennis.

Pilić was one of the Handsome Eight. Pilić was ranked world No. 6 in January 1968 and world No. 7 for 1967 by Lance Tingay of The Daily Telegraph.

== Early life ==
Pilić was born in Split, then in the Banovina of Croatia of the Kingdom of Yugoslavia, on 27 August 1939, to Krsto Pilić and Danica Tomić-Ferić.

The youngster took up tennis during the summer of 1952. Thirteen years of age at this point, he began practicing on the Firule tennis club clay courts in parallel to studying shipbuilding at the streamlined high school in Split. Upon graduating, he attempted to enroll at a community college (viša škola) in Zagreb, but due to not meeting the entrance criteria, he ended up in Novi Sad where he studied government administration (viša upravna škola).

== Tennis career ==
In 1964 he won the Moscow International Championships against countryman Boro Jovanović in five sets. Pilic reached the semifinals of Wimbledon in 1967, beating Roy Emerson. Then open tennis arrived and Pilić was one of the Handsome Eight, a group of players signed by Lamar Hunt in 1968 for the newly formed professional World Championship Tennis (WCT) group.

In 1970, Pilić won the Bristol Open or West of England Championships defeating Tom Okker in a long match, Graham Stilwell, Marty Riessen, John Newcombe in a close match, and Rod Laver in the final.

Also that season, Pilić won the men's doubles title at the US Open with his French partner Pierre Barthès by defeating the Australians John Newcombe and Rod Laver in four sets. His best singles performance at a Grand Slam tournament came in 1973 when he reached the final of the French Open, losing to Ilie Năstase in straight sets.

Pilić was the catalyst to the 1973 Wimbledon boycott. In May 1973, the Yugoslav tennis federation alleged that Pilić had refused to represent them in a Davis Cup tie against New Zealand earlier that month. Pilić denied the charge, but was suspended by the federation, and the suspension was upheld by the ILTF, albeit decreased from nine months to one month, meaning that he could not enter the Wimbledon Championships. In protest at the suspension, 81 of Pilić's fellow professionals, organized into the Association of Tennis Professionals (ATP), and including 13 of the 16 seeds, withdrew from the 1973 Wimbledon Championships.

== Post-playing ==
After retiring from playing tennis professionally, Pilić began coaching and became the first captain to win the Davis Cup trophy for three nations: Germany in 1988, 1989 and 1993, Croatia in 2005 and Serbia in 2010. He worked with the Serbia Davis Cup team in the adviser role starting in 2007, and won the Davis Cup title in 2010.

He ran a tennis academy in Oberschleißheim near Munich where he resided. Players such as Michael Stich, Novak Djokovic, Ernests Gulbis and Anastasija Sevastova developed and came through Pilić's academy.

== Personal life and death ==
In 1970, Pilić married Serbian actress Milica "Mija" Adamović. The couple had a child in 1971, daughter Danijela. Their second child, son Niko, was born in 1975.

In 2020, he was awarded the Golden Medal of Merits of Republic of Serbia.

Pilić died in Rijeka, Croatia, on 23 September 2025, at the age of 86.

A month after his death, in mid-November 2025, a ceremony was held in Pilić's honor in Bologna, attended by Ivan Ljubičić, Novak Djokovic, and Boris Becker, the players with whom Pilić won the Davis Cup.

== Grand Slam finals ==
=== Singles: 1 (1 runner-up) ===
Result	Year	Championship	Surface	Opponent	Score
Loss	1973	French Open	Clay	(Romania) Ilie Năstase	3–6, 3–6, 0–6

=== Doubles: 2 (1 title, 1 runner-up) ===
Result	Year	Championship	Surface	Partner	Opponents	Score
Loss	1962	Wimbledon	Grass	(Socialist Federal Republic of Yugoslavia) Boro Jovanović	(Australia) Bob Hewitt (Australia) Fred Stolle	2–6, 7–5, 2–6, 4–6
Win	1970	US Open	Grass	(France) Pierre Barthès	(Australia) Roy Emerson (Australia) Rod Laver	6–3, 7–6, 4–6, 7–6

== Grand Slam singles performance timeline ==
Key
W	F	SF	QF	#R	RR	Q#	DNQ	A	NH

(W) winner; (F) finalist; (SF) semifinalist; (QF) quarterfinalist; (#R) rounds 4, 3, 2, 1; (RR) round-robin stage; (Q#) qualification round; (DNQ) did not qualify; (A) absent; (NH) not held; (SR) strike rate (events won / competed); (W–L) win–loss record.

Tournament	1960	1961	1962	1963	1964	1965	1966	1967	1968	1969	1970	1971	1972	1973	1974	1975	1976	1977		1978	SR
Australian Open	A	A	2R	A	A	A	A	A	A	A	3R	2R	A	A	A	A	A	A	A	A	0 / 3
French Open	A	4R	2R	3R	4R	3R	A	A	A	2R	A	1R	A	F	A	3R	A	1R		2R	0 / 11
Wimbledon	2R	3R	2R	1R	2R	A	1R	SF	1R	1R	2R	3R	A	A	3R	1R	4R	3R		A	0 / 15
US Open	A	A	1R	A	A	1R	A	3R	4R	3R	4R	4R	4R	QF	A	A	A	A		A	0 / 9
Strike rate	0 / 1	0 / 2	0 / 4	0 / 2	0 / 2	0 / 2	0 / 1	0 / 2	0 / 2	0 / 3	0 / 3	0 / 4	0 / 1	0 / 2	0 / 1	0 / 2	0 / 1	0 / 2		0 / 1	0 / 38

Note: The Australian Open was held twice in 1977, in January and December.
