= Alberto Arilla =

Spanish tennis player (1937–2021)

- Country (sports): Spain
- Born: 24 December 1937 Barcelona, Spain
- Died: 5 September 2021 (aged 83)

Grand Slam singles results
- French Open: 4R (1965)
- Wimbledon: 1R (1958, 1961, 1962, 1963)

Alberto Arilla (24 December 1937 – 5 September 2021) was a Spanish tennis player. He usually partnered with his younger brother José Luis, Manuel Santana or Andrés Gimeno in Davis Cup competition, in which he played a total of 8 matches.

Arilla was born in Barcelona.
