= Frank Froehling =

American tennis player (1942–2020)

- Full name: Frank Arthur Froehling III
- Country (sports): United States
- Born: May 19, 1942 San Diego, California, United States
- Died: January 23, 2020 (aged 77)
- Height: 6 ft 3 in (1.91 m)
- Turned pro: 1968 (amateur from 1958)
- Retired: 1973
- Plays: Right-handed

Singles
- Career record: 442-284
- Career titles: 28
- Highest ranking: No. 6 (1963, Lance Tingay)

Grand Slam singles results
- French Open: SF (1971)
- Wimbledon: QF (1963)
- US Open: F (1963)

Doubles

Grand Slam doubles results
- US Open: F (1965)

Mixed doubles

Grand Slam mixed doubles results
- French Open: SF (1973)
- Wimbledon: SF (1964)
- US Open: F (1962, 1965)

Frank Arthur Froehling III (May 19, 1942 – January 23, 2020) was an American tennis player.

During his college career at Trinity University Froehling recorded 46–5 in singles matches and won nine singles titles.

He was runner-up at U.S. National Tennis Championships in 1963 (where he beat Roy Emerson before losing to Rafael Osuna).

That year Froehling was ranked world No. 6 by Lance Tingay of The Daily Telegraph. Froehling was ranked in the top ten U.S. players on five occasions, reaching U.S. No. 2 in 1962 and No. 3 in 1963.

In 1966 Froehling won the Eastern Clay Court Championships defeating Herb Fitzgibbon in the final in a close five set match.

In 1971 Froehling reached the French Open semifinals (beating Arthur Ashe before losing to Ilie Năstase).

Froehling won a critical match for the U.S. in the 1971 Davis Cup final against Rumania, coming from two sets down to edge Ion Tiriac in a long fifth set. The U.S. won the Davis Cup final three matches to two. Froehling had won a demonstration match against Clark Graebner, who held a strong head-to-head advantage over Froehling, to qualify for the Davis Cup singles assignment.

== Grand Slam finals ==
=== Singles (1 runner–up) ===
Result	Year	Championship	Surface	Opponent	Score
Loss	1963	U.S. Championships	Grass	(Mexico) Rafael Osuna	5–7, 4–6, 2–6

=== Doubles (1 runner-up) ===
Result	Year	Championship	Surface	Partner	Opponents	Score
Loss	1965	U.S. Championships	Grass	(United States) Charles Pasarell	(Australia) Roy Emerson (Australia) Fred Stolle	4–6, 12–10, 5–7, 3–6

=== Mixed Doubles: (2 runner-ups) ===
Result	Year	Championship	Surface	Partner	Opponents	Score
Loss	1962	U.S. Championships	Grass	(Australia) Lesley Turner	(Australia) Margaret Smith (Australia) Fred Stolle	5–7, 2–6
Loss	1965	U.S. Championships	Grass	(Australia) Judy Tegart	(Australia) Margaret Smith (Australia) Fred Stolle	2–6, 2–6
