= 1962 French Championships – Men's singles =

Men's singles
- 1962 French Championships

Final
- Champion: (Australia) Rod Laver
- Runner-up: (Australia) Roy Emerson
- Score: 3–6, 2–6, 6–3, 9–7, 6–2

Details
- Draw: 116
- Seeds: 16

Events
Singles	men	women
Doubles	men	women
- French Championships

First-seeded Rod Laver defeated second seed Roy Emerson 3–6, 2–6, 6–3, 9–7, 6–2 in the final to win the men's singles tennis title at the 1962 French Championships. Laver saved a match point en route to the title, in the quarterfinals against Martin Mulligan.

== Seeds ==
The seeded players are listed below. Rod Laver is the champion; others show the round in which they were eliminated.

1. (Australia) Rod Laver (champion)
2. (Australia) Roy Emerson (final)
3. (Spain) Manuel Santana (semifinals)
4. (Italy) Nicola Pietrangeli (quarterfinals)
5. (Australia) Neale Fraser (semifinals)
6. (United States) Whitney Reed (third round)
7. (Socialist Federal Republic of Yugoslavia) Boro Jovanović (fourth round)
8. (Australia) Warren Jacques (second round)
9. (Sweden) Jan-Erik Lundqvist (third round)
10. (India) Ramanathan Krishnan (quarterfinals)
11. (France) Pierre Darmon (quarterfinals)
12. (United Kingdom) Michael Sangster (second round)
13. (West Germany) Ingo Buding (second round)
14. (United Kingdom) Billy Knight (fourth round)
15. (West Germany) Wilhelm Bungert (fourth round)
16. (South Africa) Gordon Forbes (second round)

== Draw ==
=== Key ===
- Q = Qualifier
- WC = Wild card
- LL = Lucky loser
- r = Retired

=== Finals ===
Quarterfinals
1	(Australia) Rod Laver	6	3	2	10	6
(Australia) Martin Mulligan	4	6	6	8	2
4	(Italy) Nicola Pietrangeli	6	3	9	1
5	(Australia) Neale Fraser	4	6	11	6
11	(France) Pierre Darmon	4	2	3
3	(Spain) Manuel Santana	6	6	6
10	(India) Ramanathan Krishnan	6	1	6	2	0
2	(Australia) Roy Emerson	4	6	3	6	6

Semifinals
1	(Australia) Rod Laver	3	6	6	3	7
5	(Australia) Neale Fraser	6	3	2	6	5
3	(Spain) Manuel Santana	4	6	1	6	3
2	(Australia) Roy Emerson	6	3	6	2	6

Final
1	(Australia) Rod Laver	3	2	6	9	6
2	(Australia) Roy Emerson	6	6	3	7	2

=== Earlier rounds ===
==== Section 1 ====
First round
(Australia) Hillebrand
(Italy) Jacobini

Second round
1	(Australia) Laver	6	6	6
(Italy) Pirro	4	0	2
(Poland) Gasiorek	6	6	4	2	2
(United Kingdom) Pickard	2	2	6	6	6
16	(South Africa) Forbes	6	3	3	6	5
(Brazil) Koch	4	6	6	4	7
(Austria) Legenstein
(Italy) Jacobini

Third round
1	(Australia) Laver	6	9	4	6
(United Kingdom) Pickard	2	7	6	1
(Brazil) Koch	4	3	6	6	1
(Italy) Jacobini	6	6	4	4	6

Fourth round
1	(Australia) Laver	4	6	7	6
(Italy) Jacobini	6	3	5	1

==== Section 2 ====
First round
(Spain) Couder
8	(Australia) Jacques
(Hungary) Katona
(United Kingdom) Mills
(West Germany) Elschenbroich	3	1	2
(France) Renavand	6	6	6
(France) Duxin	1	4	0
(Australia) Mulligan	6	6	6
9	(Sweden) Lundqvist	8	6	6
(New Zealand) Crookenden	6	3	3
(France) Viron	6	3	6	2	1
(Brazil) Fernandes	2	6	4	6	6
(South Africa) Sanders	5	1	2
(Australia) Stolle	7	6	6
(France) Bresson	2	1	1
(United States) Douglas	6	6	6

Second round
8	(Australia) Jacques	9	7	6	3	0r
(United Kingdom) Mills	7	9	3	6	3
(France) Renavand	1	7	5
(Australia) Mulligan	6	9	7
9	(Sweden) Lundqvist	6	6	6
(Brazil) Fernandes	2	4	1
(Australia) Stolle	6	6	6
(United States) Douglas	2	4	2

Third round
(United Kingdom) Mills	1	0	4
(Australia) Mulligan	6	6	6
9	(Sweden) Lundqvist	6	4	0	11
(Australia) Stolle	2	6	6	13

Fourth round
(Australia) Mulligan	6	6	6
(Australia) Stolle	3	2	3

==== Section 3 ====
First round
4	(Italy) Pietrangeli	6	7	8
(United States) Fox	1	5	6
(Australia) Clayton	2	4	0
(France) Boutboul	6	6	6
(Australia) Woodcock	1	3	6	6	2
(South Africa) Segal	6	6	3	4	6
(Italy) Tacchini	1	6	3	6	3
(Ecuador) Zuleta	6	2	6	1	6
13	(West Germany) Buding	6	7	3	7
(Australia) Geraghty	3	5	6	5
(South Africa) Drysdale	6	3	3	1
(Australia) Hughes	3	6	6	6
(France) Barclay	6	7	1	3	1
(Romania) Țiriac	2	5	6	6	6
(India) Ali	3	6	2	2
(Australia) Newcombe	6	3	6	6

Second round
4	(Italy) Pietrangeli	7	6	4	6
(France) Boutboul	5	0	6	1
(South Africa) Segal	4	6	6	7
(Ecuador) Zuleta	6	3	4	5
13	(West Germany) Buding	3	2	1
(Australia) Hughes	6	6	6
(Romania) Țiriac	7	5	6	3
(Australia) Newcombe	5	7	8	6

Third round
4	(Italy) Pietrangeli	6	6	6
(South Africa) Segal	3	3	4
(Australia) Hughes	8	6	6
(Australia) Newcombe	6	3	3

Fourth round
4	(Italy) Pietrangeli	6	0	6	6
(Australia) Hughes	2	6	0	3

==== Section 4 ====
First round
5	(Australia) Fraser	6	6	6
(Italy) Guercilena	3	1	1
(United Kingdom) Cox	6	1	2
(Socialist Federal Republic of Yugoslavia) Pilić	8	6	6
(United Kingdom) Taylor	0	1	1
(France) Pilet	6	6	6
(India) Mukerjea	4	3	6	2
(Australia) Pares	6	6	2	6
12	(United Kingdom) Sangster
(Hungary) Szikszay
(United States) Frost
(West Germany) Kuhnke
(Romania) Năstase	1	3	1
(Australia) Phillips-Moore	6	6	6
(Venezuela) Pimentel	6	3	r
(Belgium) Brichant	4	6

Second round
5	(Australia) Fraser	6	6	6	2	7
(Socialist Federal Republic of Yugoslavia) Pilić	8	4	4	6	5
(France) Pilet	6	6	3	6
(Australia) Pares	4	1	6	2
12	(United Kingdom) Sangster	6	4	2	3
(West Germany) Kuhnke	2	6	6	6
(Australia) Phillips-Moore	6	6	6
(Belgium) Brichant	1	2	2

Third round
5	(Australia) Fraser	7	3	6	8
(France) Pilet	5	6	3	6
(West Germany) Kuhnke	4	1	3
(Australia) Phillips-Moore	6	6	6

Fourth round
5	(Australia) Fraser	6	3	6	6
(Australia) Phillips-Moore	3	6	1	2

==== Section 5 ====
First round
(Colombia) Álvarez	1	1	7
(Australia) Fraser	6	6	9
(Belgium) Drossart	7	4	6	4	5
(Tunisia) Belkhodja	5	6	3	6	7
(United States) Nelly	3	6	1	0
(United Kingdom) Hann	6	4	6	6
(France) Pellizza	3	4	0
11	(France) Darmon	6	6	6
(South Africa) Diepraam	3	3	1
(Italy) Merlo	6	6	6
(Argentina) Soriano	2	6	6	2	3
(Australia) Hewitt	6	2	4	6	6
(New Zealand) Hawkes	1	4	2
(Chile) Rodríguez	6	6	6
(France) Jauffret	3	8	4	4
6	(United States) Reed	6	6	6	6

Second round
(Australia) Fraser	2	6	6	6
(Tunisia) Belkhodja	6	4	1	1
(United Kingdom) Hann	6	0	1	2
11	(France) Darmon	4	6	6	6
(Italy) Merlo	6	8	3	6
(Australia) Hewitt	4	6	6	4
(Chile) Rodríguez	6	2	6	4
6	(United States) Reed	4	6	8	6

Third round
(Australia) Fraser	3	2	1
11	(France) Darmon	6	6	6
(Italy) Merlo	6	6	6
6	(United States) Reed	4	4	4

Fourth round
11	(France) Darmon	6	6	6
(Italy) Merlo	3	3	4

==== Section 6 ====
First round
(Belgium) De Gronckel
(Czechoslovakia) Javorský
(India) Lall	6	4	6	6
(Australia) Lane	8	6	3	8
(Spain) Gisbert
(Brazil) Barnes
(Hungary) Zentai
14	(United Kingdom) Knight
(France) Barthes	7	4	6	4
(United States) Froehling	9	6	3	6
(Socialist Federal Republic of Yugoslavia) Nikolic	2	4	2
(Ecuador) Olvera	6	6	6
(France) Mey	4	6	1	0	r
(France) Jauffret	6	4	6	3
(Socialist Federal Republic of Yugoslavia) Jaksic	2	1	0
3	(Spain) Santana	6	6	6

Second round
(Czechoslovakia) Javorský	1	6	6	4	6
(Australia) Lane	6	4	2	6	1
(Brazil) Barnes	3	7	4	6	2
14	(United Kingdom) Knight	6	5	6	4	6
(United States) Froehling	3	8	6
(Ecuador) Olvera	6	10	8
(France) Jauffret	1	2	2
3	(Spain) Santana	6	6	6

Third round
(Czechoslovakia) Javorský	6	0	2	0
14	(United Kingdom) Knight	4	6	6	6
(Ecuador) Olvera	3	1	1
3	(Spain) Santana	6	6	6

Fourth round
14	(United Kingdom) Knight	5	0	3
3	(Spain) Santana	7	6	6

==== Section 7 ====
First round
(United Kingdom) Drobný
(France) Jalabert
(Poland) Licis	6	3	1
(United States) Rubinoff	8	6	6
(Australia) Fletcher	4	6	5	7	2
(West Germany) Ecklebe	6	1	7	5	6
(Chile) Apey	0	2	0
10	(India) Krishnan	6	6	6
(Switzerland) Lemann	3	2	2
(France) Grinda	6	6	6
(Belgium) Despiegelaere	0	1	1
(Australia) Davidson	6	6	6
(Australia) Howe	7	6	2	8	4
(Spain) Arilla	9	1	6	6	6
(Australia) Holland	0	4	4
7	(Socialist Federal Republic of Yugoslavia) Jovanović	6	6	6

Second round
(France) Jalabert	4	6	8	3	3
(United States) Rubinoff	6	2	6	6	6
(West Germany) Ecklebe	5	3	2
10	(India) Krishnan	7	6	6
(France) Grinda	6	7	9
(Australia) Davidson	1	5	7
(Spain) Arilla	1	4	6	6	1
7	(Socialist Federal Republic of Yugoslavia) Jovanović	6	6	3	4	6

Third round
(United States) Rubinoff	3	4	1
10	(India) Krishnan	6	6	6
(France) Grinda	6	6	3	0	4
7	(Socialist Federal Republic of Yugoslavia) Jovanović	0	3	6	6	6

Fourth round
10	(India) Krishnan	6	6	6
7	(Socialist Federal Republic of Yugoslavia) Jovanović	4	2	2

==== Section 8 ====
First round
(United Kingdom) Matthews	3	4	2
(Chile) Aguirre	6	6	6

Second round
(Chile) Aguirre	4	4	6	2
(Hungary) Gulyás	6	6	4	6
(Brazil) Mandarino	6	6	6	1	5
15	(West Germany) Bungert	8	4	4	6	7
(United Kingdom) Barrett	6	2	4	3
(Mexico) Llamas	4	6	6	6
(Sweden) Hallberg	3	1	0
2	(Australia) Emerson	6	6	6

Third round
(Hungary) Gulyás	6	6	3	5	5
15	(West Germany) Bungert	3	0	6	7	7
(Mexico) Llamas	5	3	3
2	(Australia) Emerson	7	6	6

Fourth round
15	(West Germany) Bungert	8	4	6	0	2
2	(Australia) Emerson	6	6	4	6	6

Preceded by 1962 Australian Championships – Men's singles	Grand Slam men's singles	Succeeded by 1962 Wimbledon Championships – Men's singles
