= 1958 French Championships – Men's singles =

Men's singles
- 1958 French Championships

Final
- Champion: (Australia) Mervyn Rose
- Runner-up: (Chile) Luis Ayala
- Score: 6–3, 6–4, 6–4

Details
- Draw: 80
- Seeds: 16

Events
| Singles | men | women |
| Doubles | men | women |
| ← 1957 · | French Championships | · 1959 → |

Third-seeded Mervyn Rose defeated Luis Ayala 6–3, 6–4, 6–4 in the final to win the men's singles tennis title at the 1958 French Championships.

== Seeds ==
The seeded players are listed below. Mervyn Rose is the champion; others show the round in which they were eliminated.

1. (Australia) Ashley Cooper (semifinals)
2. (Australia) Neale Fraser (quarterfinals)
3. (Australia) Mervyn Rose (champion)
4. (United States) Budge Patty (fourth round)
5. (Chile) Luis Ayala (final)
6. (United Arab Republic) Jaroslav Drobný (fourth round)
7. (Belgium) Jacques Brichant (semifinals)
8. (Italy) Giuseppe Merlo (quarterfinals)
9. (United Kingdom) Robert Keith Wilson (second round)
10. (Italy) Orlando Sirola (fourth round)
11. (France) Pierre Darmon (quarterfinals)
12. (Italy) Nicola Pietrangeli (fourth round)
13. (France) Robert Haillet (quarterfinals)
14. (France) Paul Rémy (fourth round)
15. (Denmark) Kurt Nielsen (second round)
16. (Spain) Andrés Gimeno (fourth round)

== Draw ==
=== Key ===
- Q = Qualifier
- WC = Wild card
- LL = Lucky loser
- r = Retired

=== Finals ===
Quarterfinals
1 | (Australia) Ashley Cooper | 7 | 6 | 7 | 6 | 6
8 | (Italy) Giuseppe Merlo | 9 | 2 | 9 | 3 | 2
13 | (France) Robert Haillet | 0 | 5 | 4
5 | (Chile) Luis Ayala | 6 | 7 | 6
11 | (France) Pierre Darmon | 4 | 10 | 3 | 1
3 | (Australia) Mervyn Rose | 6 | 8 | 6 | 6
7 | (Belgium) Jacques Brichant | 5 | 5 | 7 | 6 | 6
2 | (Australia) Neale Fraser | 7 | 7 | 5 | 0 | 3

Semifinals
1 | (Australia) Ashley Cooper | 11 | 6 | 4 | 2 | 5
5 | (Chile) Luis Ayala | 9 | 4 | 6 | 6 | 7
3 | (Australia) Mervyn Rose | 10 | 6 | 6
7 | (Belgium) Jacques Brichant | 8 | 1 | 3

Final
5 | (Chile) Luis Ayala | 3 | 4 | 4
3 | (Australia) Mervyn Rose | 6 | 6 | 6

=== Earlier rounds ===
==== Section 1 ====
First round

Second round
1 | (Australia) Cooper | 3 | 6 | 6 | 6
(Poland) Radzio | 6 | 3 | 3 | 0
(Socialist Federal Republic of Yugoslavia) Keretic | 4 | 4 | 4
(Mexico) Palafox | 6 | 6 | 6
16 | (Spain) Gimeno | 6 | 3 | 8 | 6
(France) Bresson | 0 | 6 | 6 | 1
(United Kingdom) Knight | 6 | 6 | 6
(Colombia) Álvarez | 1 | 1 | 2

Third round
1 | (Australia) Cooper | 6 | 7 | 6
(Mexico) Palafox | 1 | 5 | 1
16 | (Spain) Gimeno | 7 | 6 | 4 | 6 | 6
(United Kingdom) Knight | 9 | 4 | 6 | 4 | 3

Fourth round
1 | (Australia) Cooper | 7 | 6 | 6
16 | (Spain) Gimeno | 5 | 1 | 4

==== Section 2 ====
First round

Second round
8 | (Italy) Merlo | 6 | 9 | 6
(Hungary) Ádám-Stolpa | 3 | 7 | 2
(France) Renavand | 3 | 2 | 3
(West Germany) Bungert | 6 | 6 | 6
9 | (United Kingdom) Wilson | 3 | 4 | 4
(Hungary) Jancsó | 6 | 6 | 6
(Sweden) Lundqvist
(India) Kumar

Third round
8 | (Italy) Merlo | 4 | 6 | 2 | 6 | 6
(West Germany) Bungert | 6 | 1 | 6 | 4 | 3
(Hungary) Jancsó | 6 | 6 | 4 | 5 | 6
(India) Kumar | 0 | 4 | 6 | 7 | 2

Fourth round
8 | (Italy) Merlo | 3 | 6 | 7 | 6
(Hungary) Jancsó | 6 | 1 | 5 | 3

==== Section 3 ====
First round

Second round
4 | (United States) Patty | 6 | 6 | 6
(France) Destremau | 0 | 2 | 3
(Czechoslovakia) Javorský | 6 | 6 | 6
(Spain) Martínez | 2 | 4 | 4
13 | (France) Haillet | 6 | 5 | 6 | 7
(Australia) Laver | 4 | 7 | 3 | 5
(West Germany) Huber | 1 | 2 | 3
(United Kingdom) Pickard | 6 | 6 | 6

Third round
4 | (United States) Patty | 6 | 6 | 6
(Czechoslovakia) Javorský | 1 | 2 | 3
13 | (France) Haillet | 6 | 6
(United Kingdom) Pickard | 1 | 0 | r

Fourth round
4 | (United States) Patty | 7 | 5 | 8 | 6 | 5
13 | (France) Haillet | 5 | 7 | 10 | 4 | 7

==== Section 4 ====
First round
5 | (Chile) Ayala | 6 | 6 | 6
(Austria) Legenstein | 0 | 2 | 4
(India) Krishnan | 6 | 9 | 8
(Chile) Aguirre | 0 | 7 | 6
(United Kingdom) Paish | 3 | 3 | 2
(Italy) Maggi | 6 | 6 | 6
(United States) Perry | 1 | 6 | 6 | 6
(France) Perreau-Saussine | 6 | 1 | 4 | 2
12 | (Italy) Pietrangeli
(Switzerland) Blondel
(Chile) Achondo
(Denmark) Ulrich
(Sweden) Schmidt
(Switzerland) Froesch
(Brazil) Ribeiro | 7 | 6 | 2 | 6
(Poland) Piatek | 5 | 1 | 6 | 4

Second round
5 | (Chile) Ayala | 6 | 6 | 4 | 4 | 6
(India) Krishnan | 1 | 3 | 6 | 6 | 3
(Italy) Maggi | 6 | 6 | 3 | 6
(United States) Perry | 2 | 4 | 6 | 1
12 | (Italy) Pietrangeli | 6 | 6 | 6
(Chile) Achondo | 1 | 3 | 3
(Sweden) Schmidt | 6 | 6 | 5 | 6
(Brazil) Ribeiro | 4 | 4 | 7 | 4

Third round
5 | (Chile) Ayala | 6 | 6 | 6
(Italy) Maggi | 3 | 2 | 0
12 | (Italy) Pietrangeli | 6 | 1 | 6 | 6
(Sweden) Schmidt | 3 | 6 | 1 | 4

Fourth round
5 | (Chile) Ayala | 6 | 6 | 6 | 6
12 | (Italy) Pietrangeli | 2 | 1 | 8 | 1

==== Section 5 ====
First round
(Chile) Rodríguez | 6 | 4 | 6 | 8
(New Zealand) Nicholls | 3 | 6 | 3 | 6
(Australia) Mark | 6 | 6 | 6
(France) Jalabert | 3 | 4 | 2
(Cuba) Garrido | 3 | 6 | 4 | 3
(United Kingdom) Mills | 6 | 2 | 6 | 6
(Brazil) Fernandes | 6 | 2 | 3
11 | (France) Darmon | 3 | 6 | 6
(Romania) Viziru | 6 | 6 | 1 | 2 | 2
(Mexico) Llamas | 4 | 2 | 6 | 6 | 6
(France) Pilet | 6 | 6 | 9
(Poland) Licis | 2 | 3 | 7
(Socialist Federal Republic of Yugoslavia) Petrovic | 3 | 0 | 0
(South Africa) Segal | 6 | 6 | 6
(United States) Frost | 4 | 0 | 2
6 | (United Arab Republic) Drobný | 6 | 6 | 6

Second round
(Chile) Rodríguez | 4 | 1 | 3
(Australia) Mark | 6 | 6 | 6
(United Kingdom) Mills | 2 | 0 | 0
11 | (France) Darmon | 6 | 6 | 6
(Mexico) Llamas | 6 | 6 | 2 | 6
(France) Pilet | 4 | 2 | 6 | 2
(South Africa) Segal | 1 | 1 | 4
6 | (United Arab Republic) Drobný | 6 | 6 | 6

Third round
(Australia) Mark | 3 | 2 | 5
11 | (France) Darmon | 6 | 6 | 7
(Mexico) Llamas | 6 | 4 | 1 | 2
6 | (United Arab Republic) Drobný | 3 | 6 | 6 | 6

Fourth round
11 | (France) Darmon | 6 | 8 | 1 | 8
6 | (United Arab Republic) Drobný | 3 | 6 | 6 | 6

==== Section 6 ====
First round

Second round
(Mexico) Osuna | 1 | 4 | 1
(Australia) Candy | 6 | 6 | 6
(Brazil) Barnes | 1 | 1 | 4
14 | (France) Rémy | 6 | 6 | 6
(France) Vaubrun | 4 | 1 | 4
(France) Molinari | 6 | 6 | 6
(Tunisia) Belkhodja | 3 | 4 | 2
3 | (Australia) Rose | 6 | 6 | 6

Third round
(Australia) Candy | 6 | 5 | 6 | 2
14 | (France) Rémy | 3 | 7 | 8 | 6
(France) Molinari | 10 | 2 | 4
3 | (Australia) Rose | 12 | 6 | 6

Fourth round
14 | (France) Rémy | 6 | 4 | 6 | 2
3 | (Australia) Rose | 4 | 6 | 8 | 6

==== Section 7 ====
First round

Second round
(Australia) Howe | 1 | 4 | 6
(France) Grinda | 6 | 6 | 8
(France) Nys | 1 | 6 | 3 | 2
10 | (Italy) Sirola | 6 | 2 | 6 | 6
(Australia) Woodcock | 6 | 4 | 4
(United States) Quillian | 4 | 6 | 1 | r
(Denmark) Ulrich
7 | (Belgium) Brichant

Third round
(France) Grinda | 6 | 7 | 6 | 2 | 2
10 | (Italy) Sirola | 4 | 9 | 4 | 6 | 6
(Australia) Woodcock | 2 | 3 | 7 | 5
7 | (Belgium) Brichant | 6 | 6 | 5 | 7

Fourth round
10 | (Italy) Sirola | 4 | 3 | 5
7 | (Belgium) Brichant | 6 | 6 | 7

==== Section 8 ====
First round

Second round
(South Africa) Hurry | 8 | 2 | 2
(Venezuela) Pimentel | 10 | 6 | 6
(Hungary) Gulyás | 6 | 6 | 6
15 | (Denmark) Nielsen | 3 | 4 | 4
(New Zealand) Gerrard | 3 | 4 | 2
(Mexico) Contreras | 6 | 6 | 6
(Spain) Arilla | 4 | 3 | 2
2 | (Australia) Fraser | 6 | 6 | 6

Third round
(Venezuela) Pimentel | 4 | 6 | 6 | 1 | 4
(Hungary) Gulyás | 6 | 3 | 4 | 6 | 6
(Mexico) Contreras | 4 | 5 | 4
2 | (Australia) Fraser | 6 | 7 | 6

Fourth round
(Hungary) Gulyás | 4 | 6 | 0 | 3
2 | (Australia) Fraser | 6 | 1 | 6 | 6

| Preceded by 1958 Australian Championships – Men's singles | Grand Slam men's singles | Succeeded by 1958 Wimbledon Championships – Men's singles |
