= 1964 French Championships – Men's singles =

Men's singles
- 1964 French Championships

Final
- Champion: (Spain) Manuel Santana
- Runner-up: (Italy) Nicola Pietrangeli
- Score: 6–3, 6–1, 4–6, 7–5

Details
- Draw: 100
- Seeds: 16

Events
Singles	men	women
Doubles	men	women
← 1963 ·	French Championships	· 1965 →

Third-seeded Manuel Santana defeated Nicola Pietrangeli 6–3, 6–1, 4–6, 7–5 in the final to win the men's singles tennis title at the 1964 French Championships.

== Seeds ==
The seeded players are listed below. Manuel Santana is the champion; others show the round in which they were eliminated.

1. (Australia) Roy Emerson (quarterfinals)
2. (France) Pierre Darmon (semifinals)
3. (Spain) Manuel Santana (champion)
4. (Sweden) Jan-Erik Lundqvist (semifinals)
5. (Mexico) Rafael Osuna (fourth round)
6. (Australia) Fred Stolle (fourth round)
7. (Australia) Martin Mulligan (fourth round)
8. (Italy) Nicola Pietrangeli (final)
9. (United Kingdom) Michael Sangster (third round)
10. (United States) Eugene Scott (quarterfinals)
11. (Australia) Tony Roche (second round)
12. (South Africa) Cliff Drysdale (quarterfinals)
13. (Australia) John Newcombe (second round)
14. (United Kingdom) Robert Keith Wilson (third round)
15. (Australia) Ken Fletcher (fourth round)
16. (Socialist Federal Republic of Yugoslavia) Nikola Pilić (fourth round)

== Draw ==
=== Key ===
- Q = Qualifier
- WC = Wild card
- LL = Lucky loser
- r = Retired

=== Finals ===
Quarterfinals
1	(Australia) Roy Emerson	1	3	3
8	(Italy) Nicola Pietrangeli	6	6	6
4	(Sweden) Jan-Erik Lundqvist	6	6	3	6
12	(South Africa) Cliff Drysdale	4	4	6	1
(Brazil) Ronald Barnes	4	3	3
3	(Spain) Manuel Santana	6	6	6
10	(United States) Eugene Scott	3	2	0
2	(France) Pierre Darmon	6	6	6

Semifinals
8	(Italy) Nicola Pietrangeli	4	6	6	6
4	(Sweden) Jan-Erik Lundqvist	6	3	4	4
3	(Spain) Manuel Santana	8	6	3	2	6
2	(France) Pierre Darmon	6	4	6	6	4

Final
8	(Italy) Nicola Pietrangeli	3	1	6	5
3	(Spain) Manuel Santana	6	6	4	7

=== Earlier rounds ===
==== Section 1 ====
First round

Second round
1	(Australia) Emerson	8	6	6
(Italy) Maggi	6	3	2
(France) Pilet	7	2	1	3
(Venezuela) Pimentel	5	6	6	6
16	(Socialist Federal Republic of Yugoslavia) Pilić	6	10	8
(Australia) Bowrey	3	8	6
(United States) McManus
(Italy) Gaudenzi

Third round
1	(Australia) Emerson	6	6	6
(Venezuela) Pimentel	0	3	2
16	(Socialist Federal Republic of Yugoslavia) Pilić	6	6	6
(Italy) Gaudenzi	0	3	3

Fourth round
1	(Australia) Emerson	4	6	6	9
16	(Socialist Federal Republic of Yugoslavia) Pilić	6	0	0	7

==== Section 2 ====
First round
(Poland) Rybarczyk	4	3	0
(Japan) Ishiguro	6	6	6
(France) Pierre Barthès
(Chile) Aguirre

Second round
Solomon
8	(Italy) Pietrangeli
(Greece) Kalogeropoulos	6	2	6	5	9
(United States) Perry	3	6	2	7	11
9	(United Kingdom) Sangster	6	7	9
(Australia) Howe	4	5	7
(Japan) Ishiguro	4	9	3	3
(France) Pierre Barthès	6	7	6	6

Third round
8	(Italy) Pietrangeli	6	6	7
(United States) Perry	2	0	5
9	(United Kingdom) Sangster	3	6	2
(France) Pierre Barthès	6	8	6

Fourth round
8	(Italy) Pietrangeli	4	6	6	6
(France) Pierre Barthès	6	2	0	2

==== Section 3 ====
First round
4	(Sweden) Lundqvist	6	6	6
(South Africa) Moore	2	1	3
(Australia) Tobin	3	6	3	6	3
(Belgium) Drossart	6	1	6	4	6
(Ecuador) Zuleta	6	9	4	4
(Tunisia) Belkhodja	8	7	6	6
(United Kingdom) Stilwell	0	1	3
(Socialist Federal Republic of Yugoslavia) Jovanović	6	6	6
13	(Australia) Newcombe	6	6	6
(Rhodesia) Bey	1	1	3
(United States) Werksman	3	6	3	2
(Argentina) Soriano	6	1	6	6
(South Africa) Zeeman	1	10	1	2
(France) Barclay	6	8	6	6
(Canada) Carpenter
(United Kingdom) Knight

Second round
4	(Sweden) Lundqvist	6	6	6
(Belgium) Drossart	0	2	1
(Tunisia) Belkhodja	2	3	2
(Socialist Federal Republic of Yugoslavia) Jovanović	6	6	6
13	(Australia) Newcombe	5	6	6	6	0
(Argentina) Soriano	7	2	3	8	6
(France) Barclay	6	6	4	6
(Canada) Carpenter	0	1	6	3

Third round
4	(Sweden) Lundqvist	6	6	11	6
(Socialist Federal Republic of Yugoslavia) Jovanović	4	8	9	2
(Argentina) Soriano	6	4	4	6
(France) Barclay	4	6	6	8

Fourth round
4	(Sweden) Lundqvist	6	6	6
(France) Barclay	1	2	3

==== Section 4 ====
First round
5	(Mexico) Osuna	7	6	7
(Italy) Tacchini	5	0	5
(France) Duxin	6	1	5	6	1
(Denmark) Ulrich	3	6	7	4	6
(Poland) Gasiorek	3	5	6	4
(West Germany) Stuck	6	7	4	6
(United States) Fisher	6	2	2	3
(United Kingdom) Drobný	3	6	6	6
12	(South Africa) Drysdale	6	6	0	6
(Japan) Konishi	0	3	6	1
(Italy) Majoli	6	2	7	6	0
(France) Renavand	4	6	5	8	6
(Australia) Lane
(Spain) Couder
(Australia) Stephens	6	6	3	0	1
(France) Jauffret	1	3	6	6	6

Second round
5	(Mexico) Osuna	6	6	8
(Denmark) Ulrich	4	3	6
(West Germany) Stuck	6	7	6
(United Kingdom) Drobný	2	5	1
12	(South Africa) Drysdale	6	6	6
(France) Renavand	1	2	4
(Spain) Couder	2	1	6	3
(France) Jauffret	6	6	2	6

Third round
5	(Mexico) Osuna	10	6	6
(West Germany) Stuck	8	3	4
12	(South Africa) Drysdale	6	6	5	10
(France) Jauffret	4	0	7	8

Fourth round
5	(Mexico) Osuna	4	10	6	4	3
12	(South Africa) Drysdale	6	8	2	6	6

==== Section 5 ====
First round
(Austria) Pokorny
(Australia) Davidson
(United States) Senkowski	5	3	2
(Hungary) Komáromi	7	6	6
(New Zealand) Gerrard	6	3	3	7
11	(Australia) Roche	2	6	6	9
(United Kingdom) Taylor
(Brazil) Barnes
(United States) Richey	1	2	6	1
(Hungary) Gulyás	6	6	1	6
(South Africa) McMillan	6	1	4	4
(Brazil) Koch	2	6	6	6
(Hungary) Varga
(West Germany) Buding
(Czechoslovakia) Holeček	1	4	5
6	(Australia) Stolle	6	6	7

Second round
(Australia) Davidson
(Hungary) Komáromi
11	(Australia) Roche	6	5	5	1
(Brazil) Barnes	4	7	7	6
(Hungary) Gulyás	9	6	6
(Brazil) Koch	7	2	1
(West Germany) Buding	6	3	1	5
6	(Australia) Stolle	4	6	6	7

Third round
(Hungary) Komáromi	2	0	0
(Brazil) Barnes	6	6	6
(Hungary) Gulyás	3	6	1	4
6	(Australia) Stolle	6	4	6	6

Fourth round
(Brazil) Barnes	7	6	2	6	8
6	(Australia) Stolle	9	4	6	4	6

==== Section 6 ====
First round
(Morocco) Chaldi	1	0	0
(Australia) Hewitt	6	6	6
(Colombia) Álvarez	6	2	3	6	2
(South Africa) Diepraam	1	6	6	4	6
(France) Contet	4	0	2
(South Africa) Brebnor	6	6	6
(Belgium) De Gronckel
14	(United Kingdom) Wilson
(Italy) Merlo	6	3	6	5	1
(Poland) Licis	2	6	2	7	6
(Argentina) Aubone	6	4	6	2
(France) Grinda	8	6	1	6
(Chile) Rodríguez
(Czechoslovakia) Koudelka
(Austria) Hainka	1	3	1
3	(Spain) Santana	6	6	6

Second round
(Australia) Hewitt	6	6	6
(South Africa) Diepraam	3	4	3
(South Africa) Brebnor	4	4	1
14	(United Kingdom) Wilson	6	6	6
(Poland) Licis	6	5	6	2	3
(France) Grinda	4	7	4	6	6
(Czechoslovakia) Koudelka	2	1	1
3	(Spain) Santana	6	6	6

Third round
(Australia) Hewitt	7	6	6
14	(United Kingdom) Wilson	5	3	0
(France) Grinda	3	2	2
3	(Spain) Santana	6	6	6

Fourth round
(Australia) Hewitt	6	4	2	2
3	(Spain) Santana	3	6	6	6

==== Section 7 ====
First round
(West Germany) Kuhnke	2	6	7	5
(Mexico) Palafox	6	3	9	7
(Canada) Godbout	4	6	3
(Hungary) Szikszay	6	8	6

Second round
(Mexico) Palafox	6	3	6	7
(Hungary) Szikszay	0	6	1	5
(New Zealand) McKenzie	4	8	6	4	7
10	(United States) Scott	6	6	1	6	9
(France) Leclercq	1	2	2
(Brazil) Mandarino	6	6	6
(France) Bresson	8	6	2	0	2
7	(Australia) Mulligan	6	4	6	6	6

Third round
(Mexico) Palafox	4	9	3
10	(United States) Scott	6	11	6
(Brazil) Mandarino	6	6	6	4	1
7	(Australia) Mulligan	2	8	2	6	6

Fourth round
10	(United States) Scott	3	6	6	1	8
7	(Australia) Mulligan	6	1	2	6	6

==== Section 8 ====
First round

Second round
(Japan) Watanabe
(Spain) Arilla
(Chile) Pinto Bravo	3	3	0
15	(Australia) Fletcher	6	6	6
(West Germany) Kreinberg
(France) Fremiot
(France) Montrenaud	3	1	4
2	(France) Darmon	6	6	6

Third round
(Spain) Arilla	7	8	6	3	3
15	(Australia) Fletcher	5	10	3	6	6
(France) Fremiot	0	2	2
2	(France) Darmon	6	6	6

Fourth round
15	(Australia) Fletcher	6	0	2	2
2	(France) Darmon	4	6	6	6

Preceded by 1964 Australian Championships – Men's singles	Grand Slam men's singles	Succeeded by 1964 Wimbledon Championships – Men's singles
