= 1961 Wimbledon Championships – Men's singles =

Men's singles
- 1961 Wimbledon Championships

Final
- Champion: (Australia) Rod Laver
- Runner-up: (United States) Chuck McKinley
- Score: 6–3, 6–1, 6–4

Details
- Draw: 128 (10Q)
- Seeds: 8

Events
Singles	men	women		boys	girls
Doubles	men	women	mixed	boys	girls
- Wimbledon Championships

Rod Laver defeated Chuck McKinley in the final, 6–3, 6–1, 6–4 to win the gentlemen's singles tennis title at the 1961 Wimbledon Championships. Neale Fraser was the defending champion, but lost in the fourth round to Bobby Wilson.

== Seeds ==
1. (Australia) Neale Fraser (fourth round)
2. (Australia) Rod Laver (champion)
3. (Italy) Nicola Pietrangeli (third round)
4. (Australia) Roy Emerson (quarterfinals)
5. (Spain) Manuel Santana (second round)
6. (Chile) Luis Ayala (quarterfinals)
7. (India) Ramanathan Krishnan (semifinals)
8. (United States) Chuck McKinley (final)

Click on the seed number of a player to go to their draw section.

== Draw ==
Key

- Q = Qualifier
- WC = Wild card
- LL = Lucky loser
- Alt = Alternate
- ITF = ITF entry
- PR = Protected ranking
- SR = Special ranking
- SE = Special exempt
- JE = Junior exempt
- JR = Junior Accelerator Programme entrant
- CO = College Accelerator Programme entrant
- NG = Next Gen Accelerator Program entrant
- w/o = Walkover
- r = Retired
- d = Defaulted

=== Finals ===
Quarterfinals
2	(Australia) Rod Laver	6	6	6
6	(Chile) Luis Ayala	1	3	2
4	(Australia) Roy Emerson	1	4	4
7	(India) Ramanathan Krishnan	6	6	6
(United Kingdom) Mike Sangster	6	6	6
(Venezuela) Isaías Pimentel	2	2	4
8	(United States) Chuck McKinley	6	6	4	6
(United Kingdom) Bobby Wilson	4	4	6	4

Semifinals
2	(Australia) Rod Laver	6	8	6
7	(India) Ramanathan Krishnan	2	6	2
(United Kingdom) Mike Sangster	4	4	6
8	(United States) Chuck McKinley	6	6	8

Final
2	(Australia) Rod Laver	6	6	6
8	(United States) Chuck McKinley	3	1	4

=== Top half ===
==== Section 1 ====
First round
2	(Australia) Rod Laver	6	6	6
(Soviet Union) Toomas Leius	4	1	1
(Socialist Federal Republic of Yugoslavia) Boro Jovanović	7	3	8
(France) Pierre Darmon	9	6	10
(West Germany) Wilhelm Bungert	5	8	7	6
(Italy) Giuseppe Merlo	7	6	5	4
(Australia) Alan Lane	3	6	4	4
(South Africa) Keith Diepraam	6	2	6	6
(Belgium) Jacques Brichant	6	3	6	6
(Poland) Władysław Skonecki	2	6	2	2
(Spain) Alberto Arilla	6	6	3	6	2
(Colombia) William Álvarez	4	8	6	4	6
(United States) Ronnie Holmberg	7	7	6
(Argentina) Enrique Morea	5	5	3
(Australia) Bob Hewitt	6	6	6
(Sweden) Staffan Stockenberg	3	2	4

Second round
2	(Australia) R Laver	8	2	6	4	6
(France) P Darmon	6	6	3	6	4
(West Germany) W Bungert	10	11	6	6
(South Africa) K Diepraam	12	9	0	4
(Belgium) J Brichant	2	6	6	7	6
(Colombia) W Álvarez	6	1	0	9	2
(United States) R Holmberg	8	6	6	2
(Australia) R Hewitt	10	8	2	6

Third round
2	(Australia) R Laver	6	6	8	4	6
(West Germany) W Bungert	3	1	10	6	3
(Belgium) J Brichant	2	3	4
(Australia) R Hewitt	6	6	6

Fourth round
2	(Australia) R Laver	6	6	6
(Australia) R Hewitt	4	4	2

==== Section 2 ====
First round
6	(Chile) Luis Ayala	6	6	6
(South Africa) Robin Sanders	3	2	2
(Netherlands) Pieter van Eijsden	2	9	4
(Czechoslovakia) Jiří Javorský	6	11	6
(Mexico) Mario Llamas	6	9	1	10	6
(Brazil) Ronnie Barnes	3	7	6	12	4
(United States) Frank Froehling	6	4	6	6
(United Kingdom) John Barrett	2	6	2	3
(United States) Bill Bond	6	12	6
(Austria) Ladislav Legenstein	4	10	2
(Hungary) István Gulyás	3	6	6	0	6
(New Zealand) Mark Otway	6	4	0	6	4
(United Kingdom) Billy Knight	7	9	9
(Norway) Thorvald Moe	5	7	7
(India) Premjit Lall	15	6	6
(United Kingdom) Julian Coni	13	1	0

Second round
6	(Chile) L Ayala	7	6	6
(Czechoslovakia) J Javorský	5	4	2
(Mexico) M Llamas	6	2	0	3
(United States) F Froehling	1	6	6	6
(United States) W Bond	6	6	6
(Hungary) I Gulyás	1	1	4
(United Kingdom) W Knight	6	8	8
(India) P Lall	3	6	6

Third round
6	(Chile) L Ayala	6	7	6
(United States) F Froehling	2	5	4
(United States) W Bond	10	7	6	7	0
(United Kingdom) W Knight	12	5	2	9	6

Fourth round
6	(Chile) L Ayala	9	6	6
(United Kingdom) W Knight	7	4	2

==== Section 3 ====
First round
4	(Australia) Roy Emerson	6	6	6
(India) Naresh Kumar	2	1	3
(United States) Crawford Henry	4	6	6	6
(United Kingdom) Michael Hann	6	2	4	4
(United Kingdom) John Ward	2	8	6	4	4
(United States) Gardnar Mulloy	6	6	1	6	6
(Australia) John Hillebrand	0	4	6	1
(United States) Jon Douglas	6	6	3	6
Q	(United States) Gene Scott	4	6	4	4
(United Kingdom) Reg Bennett	6	4	6	6
(Tunisia) Mustapha Belkhodja	6	4	11	6	6
Q	(United Kingdom) Trevor Adamson	2	6	13	2	4
(South Africa) Rod Mandelstam	10	6	6	4	3
(Australia) Warren Woodcock	12	3	4	6	6
(United Kingdom) Roger Taylor	6	6	10
(Cuba) Orlando Garrido	4	4	8

Second round
4	(Australia) R Emerson	6	6	6
(United States) C Henry	2	4	4
(United States) G Mulloy	2	2	6	1
(United States) J Douglas	6	6	4	6
(United Kingdom) R Bennett	2	7	6	3
(Tunisia) M Belkhodja	6	9	4	6
(Australia) W Woodcock	1	2	6	1
(United Kingdom) R Taylor	6	6	3	6

Third round
4	(Australia) R Emerson	6	6	5	6
(United States) J Douglas	3	0	7	4
(Tunisia) M Belkhodja	10	1	4	3
(United Kingdom) R Taylor	8	6	6	6

Fourth round
4	(Australia) R Emerson	6	6	6
(United Kingdom) R Taylor	3	1	1

==== Section 4 ====
First round
7	(India) Ramanathan Krishnan	6	6	6
(France) François Jauffret	0	4	1
(South Africa) Julie Mayer	6	5	6	3	5
(United States) Marty Riessen	3	7	4	6	7
(Italy) Orlando Sirola	6	6	6
(Canada) François Godbout	3	4	3
(Australia) Ken Fletcher	6	6	6
(Sweden) Ulf Schmidt	4	4	2
(West Germany) Dieter Ecklebe	2	2	7
(Mexico) Antonio Palafox	6	6	9
(United Kingdom) Alan Mills	5	6	4	5
(Japan) Osamu Ishiguro	7	4	6	7
(United Kingdom) Tony Pickard	6	6	6
(France) Jacques Renavand	2	4	4
(Austria) Franz Saiko	6	6	6
Q	(Mexico) Gabino Palafox	4	0	2

Second round
7	(India) R Krishnan	6	6	11
(United States) M Riessen	3	2	9
(Italy) O Sirola	6	0	3	7	6
(Australia) K Fletcher	4	6	6	5	0
(Mexico) A Palafox	6	6	6	6
(Japan) O Ishiguro	2	3	8	3
(United Kingdom) A Pickard	6	11	3	6
(Austria) F Saiko	4	9	6	2

Third round
7	(India) R Krishnan	6	3	6	6
(Italy) O Sirola	4	6	3	1
(Mexico) A Palafox	6	6	6
(United Kingdom) A Pickard	3	3	2

Fourth round
7	(India) R Krishnan	4	6	6	6
(Mexico) A Palafox	6	1	3	1

=== Bottom half ===
==== Section 5 ====
First round
(Australia) Neil Gibson	3	6	3	7	6
(Australia) Geoffrey Pares	6	3	6	5	8
(United Kingdom) Mike Sangster	6	6	6
(Canada) Robert Bédard	3	2	4
(Australia) John Newcombe	8	4	6	6	4
(Sweden) Jan-Erik Lundqvist	10	6	3	2	6
(Chile) Patricio Rodríguez	6	1	0	3
(United States) Dennis Ralston	3	6	6	6
(United States) John Lesch	4	1	1
(Australia) Bob Howe	6	6	6
(Mexico) Esteban Reyes Jr.	1	6	3	6	2
(Federation of Rhodesia and Nyasaland) Adrian Bey	6	4	6	4	6
(Soviet Union) Sergei Likhachev	6	2	3	0
(South Africa) Abe Segal	1	6	6	6
(Netherlands) Willem Maris	2	0	2
5	(Spain) Manuel Santana	6	6	6

Second round
(Australia) G Pares	3	6	3	3
(United Kingdom) M Sangster	6	4	6	6
(Sweden) J-E Lundqvist	4	2	6	14
(United States) D Ralston	6	6	3	16
(Australia) R Howe	4	8	11	4
(Federation of Rhodesia and Nyasaland) A Bey	6	10	9	6
(South Africa) A Segal	6	6	12
5	(Spain) M Santana	4	4	10

Third round
(United Kingdom) M Sangster	6	4	6	6	6
(United States) D Ralston	8	6	3	3	4
(Federation of Rhodesia and Nyasaland) A Bey	3	4	4
(South Africa) A Segal	6	6	6

Fourth round
(United Kingdom) M Sangster	8	8	6
(South Africa) A Segal	6	6	4

==== Section 6 ====
First round
(United States) Bobby Siska	6	3	2	8	5
(Socialist Federal Republic of Yugoslavia) Nikola Pilić	4	6	6	6	7
(Austria) Franz Hainka	6	6	6
(Belgium) Philippe Washer	0	4	4
(France) Gérard Pilet	1	2	6	4
(Venezuela) Isaías Pimentel	6	6	3	6
(Australia) Will Coghlan	4	6	6	6
(West Germany) Christian Kuhnke	6	4	4	3
(United Kingdom) Norman Kitovitz	1	2	3
(United States) Chris Crawford	6	6	6
(United States) Malcolm Fox	6	9	6
LL	(South Africa) Frew McMillan	4	7	4
Q	(Brazil) José Edison Mandarino	3	6	1	6	3
(Australia) Barry Phillips-Moore	6	3	6	4	6
(India) Akhtar Ali	4	2	1
3	(Italy) Nicola Pietrangeli	6	6	6

Second round
(Socialist Federal Republic of Yugoslavia) N Pilić	7	4	6	8
(Austria) F Hainka	5	6	3	6
(Venezuela) I Pimentel	6	3	6	11
(Australia) W Coghlan	4	6	3	9
(United States) C Crawford	6	6	6
(United States) M Fox	2	2	2
(Australia) B Phillips-Moore	3	4	6	3
3	(Italy) N Pietrangeli	6	6	1	6

Third round
(Socialist Federal Republic of Yugoslavia) N Pilić	6	5	3	6	5
(Venezuela) I Pimentel	4	7	6	1	7
(United States) C Crawford	2	6	6	6
3	(Italy) N Pietrangeli	6	3	4	4

Fourth round
(Venezuela) I Pimentel	6	6	12
(United States) C Crawford	4	2	10

==== Section 7 ====
First round
Q	(Australia) Greg Hughes	2	5	0
(France) Jean-Claude Barclay	6	7	6
Q	(France) Daniel Contet	4	2	3
(United States) Donald Dell	6	6	6
(Australia) Warren Jacques	6	6	3	7
(Denmark) Jørgen Ulrich	3	2	6	5
Q	(Sweden) Ingemar Ingvarsson	2	4	4
(West Germany) Ingo Buding	6	6	6
(Poland) Wiesław Gąsiorek	7	6	6
(Norway) Finn-Dag Jagge	5	2	4
(United Kingdom) Geoffrey Paish	5	6	6	2	6
(United Kingdom) Geoff Ward	7	2	3	6	3
(South Africa) Bertie Gaertner	5	6	3	6	7
(Finland) Reino Nyyssönen	7	3	6	2	5
(Italy) Sergio Tacchini	2	2	6	4
8	(United States) Chuck McKinley	6	6	4	6

Second round
(France) J-C Barclay	3	4	2
(United States) D Dell	6	6	6
(Australia) W Jacques	7	6	6
(West Germany) I Buding	5	0	4
(Poland) W Gąsiorek	6	6	4	4	6
(United Kingdom) G Paish	2	1	6	6	2
(South Africa) A Gaertner	2	1	3
8	(United States) C McKinley	6	6	6

Third round
(United States) D Dell	8	4	6	7
(Australia) W Jacques	6	6	8	9
(Poland) W Gąsiorek	3	6	0	2
8	(United States) C McKinley	6	4	6	6

Fourth round
(Australia) W Jacques	6	1	5
8	(United States) C McKinley	8	6	7

==== Section 8 ====
First round
(United States) Jack Frost	6	6	6
(West Germany) Wolfgang Stuck	4	2	2
(Australia) Bob Mark	10	6	2	6
(New Zealand) Lew Gerrard	8	3	6	1
Q	(United Kingdom) Roy Dixon	2	3	3
(Brazil) Carlos Fernandes	6	6	6
(Argentina) Eduardo Soriano	2	6	7	14	3
(United Kingdom) Bobby Wilson	6	4	5	16	6
(India) Jaidip Mukerjea	3	4	6	3
(Australia) Fred Stolle	6	6	3	6
Q	(United Kingdom) Humphrey Truman	5	1	1
(Australia) Martin Mulligan	7	6	6
Q	(West Germany) Harald Elschenbroich	2	4	4
(United States) Whitney Reed	6	6	6
(United States) Rudy Hernando	3	1	1
1	(Australia) Neale Fraser	6	6	6

Second round
(United States) J Frost	6	6	6
(Australia) R Mark	4	4	4
(Brazil) C Fernandes	3	6	4
(United Kingdom) R Wilson	6	8	6
(Australia) F Stolle	1	4	0^{r}
(Australia) M Mulligan	6	6	1
(United States) W Reed	7	4	6	1	5
1	(Australia) N Fraser	5	6	4	6	7

Third round
(United States) J Frost	2	4	4
(United Kingdom) R Wilson	6	6	6
(Australia) M Mulligan	2	6	2	1
1	(Australia) N Fraser	6	3	6	6

Fourth round
(United Kingdom) R Wilson	1	6	13	9
1	(Australia) N Fraser	6	0	11	7

Preceded by 1961 French Championships	Grand Slams; Men's singles	Succeeded by 1961 U.S. Championships
