= 1961 French Championships – Men's singles =

Men's singles
- 1961 French Championships

Final
- Champion: (Spain) Manuel Santana
- Runner-up: (Italy) Nicola Pietrangeli
- Score: 4–6, 6–1, 3–6, 6–0, 6–2

Details
- Draw: 81
- Seeds: 16

Events
Singles	men	women
Doubles	men	women
- French Championships

Sixth-seeded Manuel Santana defeated Nicola Pietrangeli 4–6, 6–1, 3–6, 6–0, 6–2 in the final to win the men's singles tennis title at the 1961 French Championships. Santana became the first Spaniard to win a Grand Slam tournament singles title.

== Seeds ==
The seeded players are listed below. Manuel Santana is the champion; others show the round in which they were eliminated.

1. (Italy) Nicola Pietrangeli (final)
2. (Australia) Rod Laver (semifinals)
3. (Australia) Roy Emerson (quarterfinals)
4. (Sweden) Jan-Erik Lundqvist (semifinals)
5. (France) Pierre Darmon (third round)
6. (Spain) Manuel Santana (champion)
7. (United States) Ron Holmberg (quarterfinals)
8. (United Kingdom) Robert Wilson (fourth round)
9. (Australia) Robert Mark (second round)
10. (Belgium) Jacques Brichant (fourth round)
11. (Sweden) Ulf Schmidt (first round)
12. (Australia) Bob Hewitt (fourth round)
13. (Mexico) Mario Llamas (fourth round)
14. (Italy) Orlando Sirola (third round)
15. (Brazil) Ronald Barnes (fourth round)
16. (New Zealand) Lew Gerrard (second round)

== Draw ==
=== Key ===
- Q = Qualifier
- WC = Wild card
- LL = Lucky loser
- r = Retired

=== Finals ===
Quarterfinals
1	(Italy) Nicola Pietrangeli	6	6	6	6
(France) Gérard Pilet	4	8	3	1
4	(Sweden) Jan-Erik Lundqvist	6	6	6
(Brazil) Carlos Fernandes	4	4	3
6	(Spain) Manuel Santana	9	6	6
3	(Australia) Roy Emerson	7	2	2
7	(United States) Ron Holmberg	4	0	6	3
2	(Australia) Rod Laver	6	6	3	6

Semifinals
1	(Italy) Nicola Pietrangeli	6	6	6
4	(Sweden) Jan-Erik Lundqvist	4	4	4
6	(Spain) Manuel Santana	3	6	4	6	6
2	(Australia) Rod Laver	6	2	6	4	0

Final
1	(Italy) Nicola Pietrangeli	6	1	6	0	2
6	(Spain) Manuel Santana	4	6	3	6	6

=== Earlier rounds ===
==== Section 1 ====
First round

Second round
1	(Italy) Pietrangeli	6	6	6
(France) Contet	2	3	4
(Denmark) Ulrich
(Australia) Newcombe
16	(New Zealand) Gerrard	3	6	4	2
(Tunisia) Belkhodja	6	4	6	6
(Socialist Federal Republic of Yugoslavia) Pilić	6	4	4	6	6
(Australia) Gibson	2	6	6	3	1

Third round
1	(Italy) Pietrangeli	6	6	6
(Australia) Newcombe	2	2	4
(Tunisia) Belkhodja	4	6	1	2
(Socialist Federal Republic of Yugoslavia) Pilić	6	1	6	6

Fourth round
1	(Italy) Pietrangeli	6	6	6	8
(Socialist Federal Republic of Yugoslavia) Pilić	4	8	3	6

==== Section 2 ====
First round

Second round
8	(United Kingdom) Wilson	6	6	6
(Argentina) Morea	4	2	2
(Brazil) Mandarino	7	3	4	6
(France) Jauffret	5	6	6	8
9	(Australia) Mark	3	6	6	2
(Poland) Skonecki	6	3	8	6
(United States) Henry	6	4	6	3
(France) Pilet	1	6	8	6

Third round
8	(United Kingdom) Wilson	6	6	6
(France) Jauffret	2	3	3
(Poland) Skonecki	2	2	6
(France) Pilet	6	6	8

Fourth round
8	(United Kingdom) Wilson	6	5	1
(France) Pilet	8	7	6

==== Section 3 ====
First round

Second round
4	(Sweden) Lundqvist
(France) Grandet
(South Africa) Gaertner	6	4	4	4
(United Kingdom) Barrett	2	6	6	6
13	(Mexico) Llamas	6	6	6
(Poland) Licis	4	2	3
(West Germany) Buding	6	6	4	6
(France) Boutboul	3	3	6	1

Third round
4	(Sweden) Lundqvist	6	6	6
(United Kingdom) Barrett	3	1	3
13	(Mexico) Llamas	6	6	6
(West Germany) Buding	3	3	3

Fourth round
4	(Sweden) Lundqvist	6	3	8	6
13	(Mexico) Llamas	4	6	6	3

==== Section 4 ====
First round
5	(France) Darmon	6	6	6
(Canada) Godbout	2	2	2
(United Kingdom) Pickard	6	6	5	1	6
(West Germany) Ecklebe	3	1	7	6	3
(Brazil) Fernandes	6	6	6
(France) Bresson	4	4	2
(Chile) Rodríguez	6	3	6	2	2
(Australia) Howe	4	6	4	6	6
12	(Australia) Hewitt	3	6	6	6
(West Germany) Kuhnke	6	2	4	3
(Socialist Federal Republic of Yugoslavia) Plećević	1	5	0
(South Africa) Mayer	6	7	6
(New Zealand) Otway	4	6	6	6
(India) Mukerjea	6	0	3	2
(Australia) Mulligan	0	4	6	7	6
(Poland) Gasiorek	6	6	4	5	4

Second round
5	(France) Darmon	6	6	6
(United Kingdom) Pickard	1	3	2
(Brazil) Fernandes	7	6	6
(Australia) Howe	5	3	2
12	(Australia) Hewitt	3	3	6	7	6
(South Africa) Mayer	6	6	2	5	3
(New Zealand) Otway	5	4	5
(Australia) Mulligan	7	6	7

Third round
5	(France) Darmon	3	3	2
(Brazil) Fernandes	6	6	6
12	(Australia) Hewitt	6	3	6	6
(Australia) Mulligan	3	6	1	2

Fourth round
(Brazil) Fernandes	9	2	6	6
12	(Australia) Hewitt	7	6	2	2

==== Section 5 ====
First round
(Socialist Federal Republic of Yugoslavia) Jovanović	6	2	6	6	6
(West Germany) Bungert	8	6	0	4	4
(Australia) Stolle	4	5	2
(France) Molinari	6	7	5	r
(India) Lall	4	10	3
(United Kingdom) Sangster	6	12	6
(Venezuela) Pimentel	6	6	6
11	(Sweden) Schmidt	3	1	0
(South Africa) Sanders	4	3	4
(Colombia) Álvarez	6	6	6
(Italy) Tacchini	6	2	5	6	6
(France) Renavand	4	6	7	4	0
(Cuba) Garrido
(Hungary) Gulyás
(Federation of Rhodesia and Nyasaland) Bey	2	6	1	3
6	(Spain) Santana	6	1	6	6

Second round
(Socialist Federal Republic of Yugoslavia) Jovanović	2	9	2
(Australia) Stolle	6	11	6
(United Kingdom) Sangster	6	6	0	6
(Venezuela) Pimentel	3	4	6	4
(Colombia) Álvarez	7	6	6	6
(Italy) Tacchini	5	8	1	4
(Hungary) Gulyás	3	1	3
6	(Spain) Santana	6	6	6

Third round
(Australia) Stolle	1	3	3
(United Kingdom) Sangster	6	6	6
(Colombia) Álvarez	4	1	3
6	(Spain) Santana	6	6	6

Fourth round
(United Kingdom) Sangster	3	4	3
6	(Spain) Santana	6	6	6

==== Section 6 ====
First round
(Canada) Swann	1	0	7
(Australia) Phillips-Moore	6	6	9

Second round
(Australia) Phillips-Moore	6	7	7
(France) Duxin	4	5	5
(Denmark) Ulrich
14	(Italy) Sirola
(United Kingdom) Coni	3	3	2
(France) Barclay	6	6	6
(United Kingdom) Hann	4	4	2
3	(Australia) Emerson	6	6	6

Third round
(Australia) Phillips-Moore	6	6	6
14	(Italy) Sirola	3	3	0
(France) Barclay	5	1	0
3	(Australia) Emerson	7	6	6

Fourth round
(Australia) Phillips-Moore	2	6	3	2
3	(Australia) Emerson	6	4	6	6

==== Section 7 ====
First round

Second round
(South Africa) Segal	6	6	6
(Italy) Gaudenzi	2	3	3
(France) Jalabert	3	1	6	2
10	(Belgium) Brichant	6	6	0	6
(Morocco) Lahcen Chaldi	6	6	2	9
(Socialist Federal Republic of Yugoslavia) Presecki	3	2	6	7
(France) Jauffret	3	8	4
7	(United States) Holmberg	6	10	6

Third round
(South Africa) Segal	3	1	3
10	(Belgium) Brichant	6	6	6
(Morocco) Lahcen Chaldi	6	1	0	3
7	(United States) Holmberg	3	6	6	6

Fourth round
10	(Belgium) Brichant	6	6	4	3
7	(United States) Holmberg	2	8	6	6

==== Section 8 ====
First round

Second round
(Australia) Fletcher	6	6	6
(France) Grinda	3	2	4
(Czechoslovakia) Javorský	4	1	0
15	(Brazil) Barnes	6	6	6
(United Kingdom) Mills	2	3	4
(Argentina) Soriano	6	6	6
(India) Ali	2	2	2
2	(Australia) Laver	6	6	6

Third round
(Australia) Fletcher	3	2	5
15	(Brazil) Barnes	6	6	7
(Argentina) Soriano	2	3	8
2	(Australia) Laver	6	6	10

Fourth round
15	(Brazil) Barnes	3	6	2	3
2	(Australia) Laver	6	4	6	6

Preceded by 1961 Australian Championships – Men's singles	Grand Slam men's singles	Succeeded by 1961 Wimbledon Championships – Men's singles
