= 1963 French Championships – Men's singles =

Men's singles
- 1963 French Championships

Final
- Champion: (Australia) Roy Emerson
- Runner-up: (France) Pierre Darmon
- Score: 3–6, 6–1, 6–4, 6–4

Details
- Draw: 104
- Seeds: 16

Events
Singles	men	women
Doubles	men	women
- French Championships

First-seeded Roy Emerson defeated Pierre Darmon 3–6, 6–1, 6–4, 6–4 in the final to win the men's singles tennis title at the 1963 French Championships.

== Seeds ==
The seeded players are listed below. Roy Emerson is the champion; others show the round in which they were eliminated.

1. (Australia) Roy Emerson (champion)
2. (Spain) Manuel Santana (semifinals)
3. (France) Pierre Darmon (final)
4. (Australia) Ken Fletcher (quarterfinals)
5. (Sweden) Jan-Erik Lundqvist (second round)
6. (Australia) Bob Hewitt (fourth round)
7. (India) Ramanathan Krishnan (second round)
8. (United Kingdom) Billy Knight (fourth round)
9. (Italy) Nicola Pietrangeli (quarterfinals)
10. (Australia) Martin Mulligan (third round)
11. (Australia) Tony Roche (first round)
12. (Australia) Fred Stolle (second round)
13. (West Germany) Wilhelm Bungert (second round)
14. (Socialist Federal Republic of Yugoslavia) Nikola Pilić (third round)
15. (Hungary) István Gulyás (third round)
16. (West Germany) Christian Kuhnke (fourth round)

== Draw ==
=== Key ===
- Q = Qualifier
- WC = Wild card
- LL = Lucky loser
- r = Retired

=== Finals ===
Quarterfinals
1	(Australia) Roy Emerson	6	4	6	6	6
9	(Italy) Nicola Pietrangeli	8	6	1	3	4
4	(Australia) Ken Fletcher	6	3	8	3
(United Kingdom) Michael Sangster	8	6	6	6
(United Kingdom) Robert Keith Wilson	3	4	3
3	(France) Pierre Darmon	6	6	6
(France) Jean-Claude Barclay	6	2	0	6	3
2	(Spain) Manuel Santana	1	6	6	2	6

Semifinals
1	(Australia) Roy Emerson	8	6	6
(United Kingdom) Michael Sangster	6	3	4
3	(France) Pierre Darmon	6	4	2	9	6
2	(Spain) Manuel Santana	3	6	6	7	2

Final
1	(Australia) Roy Emerson	3	6	6	6
3	(France) Pierre Darmon	6	1	4	4

=== Earlier rounds ===
==== Section 1 ====
First round

Second round
1	(Australia) Emerson	6	6	6
(Spain) Arilla	4	4	0
(Tunisia) Belkhodja	6	6	6
(Australia) Newcombe	4	2	2
16	(West Germany) Kuhnke	6	6	6
(United States) Hoogs	4	4	1
(Australia) Hillebrand	6	4	6	2	6
(United Kingdom) Drobný	3	6	3	6	8

Third round
1	(Australia) Emerson	6	6	6
(Tunisia) Belkhodja	2	4	1
16	(West Germany) Kuhnke	6	6	7
(United Kingdom) Drobný	3	0	5

Fourth round
1	(Australia) Emerson	5	6	6	4	6
16	(West Germany) Kuhnke	7	3	2	6	4

==== Section 2 ====
First round
(Australia) Keller	1	2	1
(Brazil) Koch	6	6	6
(France) Matton	2	2	2
(Italy) Gaudenzi	6	6	6
(West Germany) Stuck	6	6	6
(South Africa) Zeeman	1	1	1

Second round
8	(United Kingdom) Knight	1	7	4	6	6
(South Africa) Forbes	6	5	6	4	0
(France) Barthès	6	6	6
(Hungary) Szikszay	2	3	3
9	(Italy) Pietrangeli	10	6	6
(Brazil) Koch	8	3	0
(Italy) Gaudenzi	6	2	3	4
(West Germany) Stuck	3	6	6	6

Third round
8	(United Kingdom) Knight	2	6	7	6
(France) Barthès	6	1	5	2
9	(Italy) Pietrangeli	6	2	6	10
(West Germany) Stuck	3	6	2	8

Fourth round
8	(United Kingdom) Knight	7	2	4	6	2
9	(Italy) Pietrangeli	5	6	6	2	6

==== Section 3 ====
First round
4	(Australia) Fletcher
(Ecuador) Zuleta
(Brazil) Mandarino	7	7	6
(Chile) Aguirre	5	5	4
(France) Bresson	6	2	2	6	6
(Netherlands) Maris	3	6	6	3	3
(Chile) Rodríguez	6	6	6
(Socialist Federal Republic of Yugoslavia) Jovanović	4	0	3
13	(West Germany) Bungert	1	6	7	2	8
(Belgium) Drossart	6	2	5	6	6
(France) Renavand	6	5	2	9	6
(Australia) Holland	2	7	6	7	1
(Australia) Woodcock	2	6	6	6
(Italy) Tacchini	6	4	1	2
(France) Beust	6	4	7	6
(France) Montrenaud	0	6	5	4

Second round
4	(Australia) Fletcher	7	2	6	6
(Brazil) Mandarino	5	6	4	1
(France) Bresson	1	3	6	6
(Chile) Rodríguez	6	6	4	8
13	(West Germany) Bungert	4	2	7	8	4
(France) Renavand	6	6	5	6	6
(Australia) Woodcock	2	3	6	3
(France) Beust	6	6	2	6

Third round
4	(Australia) Fletcher	6	7	0	2	6
(Chile) Rodríguez	1	5	6	6	2
(France) Renavand	6	7	3	0	6
(France) Beust	3	5	6	6	1

Fourth round
4	(Australia) Fletcher	6	6	6	4	6
(France) Renavand	3	1	8	6	4

==== Section 4 ====
First round
5	(Sweden) Lundqvist
(Italy) Pirro
(Australia) Jacques	2	2	3
(United Kingdom) Taylor	6	6	6
(South Africa) McMillan	2	6	1
(Federation of Rhodesia and Nyasaland) Bey	6	8	6
(Czechoslovakia) Javorský	6	7	6
(France) Grinda	2	5	3
12	(Australia) Stolle
(France) Abdesselam
(Switzerland) Sturdza	2	2	9	6	4
(United Kingdom) Sangster	6	6	7	2	6
(France) Jauffret	4	6	3	6	6
(United Kingdom) Hann	6	4	6	3	2
(United States) Vincent	9	2	1
(Spain) Couder	11	6	6

Second round
5	(Sweden) Lundqvist
(United Kingdom) Taylor
(Federation of Rhodesia and Nyasaland) Bey	2	1	4
(Czechoslovakia) Javorský	6	6	6
12	(Australia) Stolle	6	4	3	1
(United Kingdom) Sangster	1	6	6	6
(France) Jauffret	7	4	4
(Spain) Couder	9	6	6

Third round
(United Kingdom) Taylor	3	6	6	11
(Czechoslovakia) Javorský	6	8	3	13
(United Kingdom) Sangster	6	2	0	6	6
(Spain) Couder	3	6	6	2	1

Fourth round
(Czechoslovakia) Javorský	9	4	8	2	2
(United Kingdom) Sangster	7	6	6	6	6

==== Section 5 ====
First round
(New Zealand) Crookenden	6	6	6
(Italy) Merlo	2	2	4
(West Germany) Kreinberg	7	6	6	8
11	(Australia) Roche	9	2	4	6
(Poland) Licis	5	1	1
(Australia) Howe	7	6	6
(France) Boutboul	4	4	6
(United Kingdom) Wilson	6	6	8
(South Africa) Drysdale	9	6	11
(Federation of Rhodesia and Nyasaland) Salomon	7	3	9
(Romania) Țiriac	6	6	6
(France) Leclercq	4	3	2
(France) Jauffret	7	4	3	4
(Belgium) Brichant	5	6	6	6
(France) Bouteleux
6	(Australia) Hewitt

Second round
(New Zealand) Crookenden	1	1	4
(West Germany) Kreinberg	6	6	6
(Australia) Howe	2	1	0
(United Kingdom) Wilson	6	6	6
(South Africa) Drysdale	7	6	1	6
(Romania) Țiriac	9	1	6	8
(Belgium) Brichant	6	6	3	2
6	(Australia) Hewitt	8	4	6	6

Third round
(West Germany) Kreinberg	2	0	3
(United Kingdom) Wilson	6	6	6
(Romania) Țiriac	6	1	2	5
6	(Australia) Hewitt	2	6	6	7

Fourth round
(United Kingdom) Wilson	6	6	6
6	(Australia) Hewitt	1	2	4

==== Section 6 ====
First round
(Brazil) Fernandes	5	5	2
(France) Duxin	7	7	6
(Australia) Lane	4	6	8	7
(West Germany) Ecklebe	6	2	6	5
(Spain) Arilla	5	6	6	6	6
(South Africa) Diepraam	7	8	2	4	1
(Chile) Pinto Bravo	3	2	8
14	(Socialist Federal Republic of Yugoslavia) Pilić	6	6	10
(United States) Rubinoff	1	6	0	r
(France) Contet	6	8	1
(Australia) Fraser	6	6	6
(France) Rinderknech	4	2	2
(Federation of Rhodesia and Nyasaland) Black	3	2	2
(South Africa) Segal	6	6	6
(Socialist Federal Republic of Yugoslavia) Jelic
3	(France) Darmon

Second round
(France) Duxin	3	6	6	3	3
(Australia) Lane	6	4	4	6	6
(Spain) Arilla	3	4	2
14	(Socialist Federal Republic of Yugoslavia) Pilić	6	6	6
(France) Contet	1	11	6	7
(Australia) Fraser	6	9	3	5
(South Africa) Segal	3	2	1
3	(France) Darmon	6	6	6

Third round
(Australia) Lane	3	6	6	6
14	(Socialist Federal Republic of Yugoslavia) Pilić	6	2	2	2
(France) Contet	2	4	3
3	(France) Darmon	6	6	6

Fourth round
(Australia) Lane	7	5	2	4
3	(France) Darmon	5	7	6	6

==== Section 7 ====
First round
(France) Barclay
(Socialist Federal Republic of Yugoslavia) Presecki
(Italy) Maggi	4	2	6	6	6
(United States) Fisher	6	6	3	2	3
(Colombia) Álvarez	6	6	6
(Czechoslovakia) Strobl	3	1	2

Second round
(France) Barclay	6	7	6	6
(Italy) Maggi	1	9	1	4
(Colombia) Álvarez	7	4^{d}
10	(Australia) Mulligan	5	4
(Brazil) Barnes	9	9	7
(France) Destremau	7	7	5
(United Kingdom) Pickard
7	(India) Krishnan	w/o

Third round
(France) Barclay	6	5	6	6
10	(Australia) Mulligan	1	7	1	4
(Brazil) Barnes	7	6	6
(United Kingdom) Pickard	5	1	2

Fourth round
(France) Barclay	6	2	6	6
(Brazil) Barnes	4	6	3	3

==== Section 8 ====
First round

Second round
(West Germany) Buding
(Australia) Davidson
(Romania) Mărmureanu	1	3	6	3
15	(Hungary) Gulyás	6	6	3	6
(France) Jalabert	5	6	0	2
(New Zealand) McKenzie	7	1	6	6
(Argentina) Soriano	5	4	4
2	(Spain) Santana	7	6	6

Third round
(Australia) Davidson	6	6	2	11
15	(Hungary) Gulyás	4	2	6	9
(New Zealand) McKenzie	4	10	2
2	(Spain) Santana	6	12	6

Fourth round
(Australia) Davidson	0	4	4
2	(Spain) Santana	6	6	6

Preceded by 1963 Australian Championships – Men's singles	Grand Slam men's singles	Succeeded by 1963 Wimbledon Championships – Men's singles
