= Julie Mayer (tennis) =

South African tennis player

- Full name: Julius Mayer
- Country (sports): South Africa

Grand Slam singles results
- French Open: 2R (1961)
- Wimbledon: 1R (1956, 1961)
Medal record
Maccabiah Games
Gold medal – first place	1957 Israel	Men's doubles
Silver medal – second place	1957 Israel	Men's singles

Julius Mayer, known as Julie Mayer, was a South African tennis player.

Mayer was a nephew of South African Davis Cup representative Syd Levy.

Nicknamed "Big Julie", Mayer represented South Africa in both the Davis Cup and Maccabiah Games. He won a gold medal in doubles at the 1957 Maccabiah Games partnering Abe Segal, to whom he lost the singles final. In 1961, Mayer was a member of the South Africa Davis Cup team which faced Romania in Bucharest and he defeated a young Ion Țiriac in a five–set match. He held a match point against Bob Hewitt in his second round loss at the 1961 French Championships and was runner–up to Gordon Forbes at that year's South African Championship.

Mayer, a University of the Witwatersrand law graduate, ended up immigrating to Sydney, Australia.
