= Tony Pickard =

British tennis player and coach

- Full name: John Anthony Pickard
- Country (sports): United Kingdom
- Born: 13 September 1934 (age 91) Ripley

Singles
- Career record: 254-187
- Career titles: 19

Grand Slam singles results
- Australian Open: 1R (1954)
- French Open: 3R (1958, 1962, 1963)
- Wimbledon: 3R (1961, 1963, 1964)
- US Open: 2R (1959)

Grand Slam doubles results
- Australian Open: QF (1954)
- Wimbledon: QF (1961)

Grand Slam mixed doubles results
- Australian Open: 1R (1954)
- Wimbledon: 3R (1956, 1962)

John Anthony Pickard (born 13 September 1934) is a British former tennis player turned coach. He is best known as the longtime coach of former world No. 1 Stefan Edberg.

== Career ==
Pickard won the 1959 Newport Casino Invitational tournament on grass with long best-of-five sets match wins against Noel Brown, Donald Dell, and Ron Holmberg in the final.

Pickard won the 1961 British Covered Court Championships in London defeating Manuel Santana in the final. He also won the 1962 London Hard Court Championships on clay at The Hurlingham Club defeating Roger Becker and Warren Jacques in the last two rounds.

Pickard captained the Great Britain Davis Cup team led by Tim Henman, and was Greg Rusedski's coach in 1997–98. He has also coached Anne Keothavong.
