= Fred Stolle =

Australian tennis player (1938–2025)

Fred Stolle AO
- Full name: Frederick Sydney Stolle
- Country (sports): Australia
- Residence: Aventura, Florida, US
- Born: 8 October 1938 Hornsby, New South Wales, Australia
- Died: 5 March 2025 (aged 86) Palm Desert, California, U.S.
- Height: 6 ft 3 in (1.91 m)
- Turned pro: 1966 (amateur from 1958)
- Retired: 1978
- Plays: Right-handed (one-handed backhand)
- Int. Tennis HoF: 1985 (member page)

Singles
- Career record: 860–442 (66.0%)
- Career titles: 39
- Highest ranking: No. 1 (1966, World Tennis)

Grand Slam singles results
- Australian Open: F (1964, 1965)
- French Open: W (1965)
- Wimbledon: F (1963, 1964, 1965)
- US Open: W (1966)

Other tournaments
- Professional majors
- US Pro: SF (1967)
- Wembley Pro: 1R (1967)
- French Pro: SF (1967)

Doubles
- Career record: 189–101
- Highest ranking: No. 1 (1964)

Grand Slam doubles results
- Australian Open: W (1963, 1964, 1966)
- French Open: W (1965, 1968)
- Wimbledon: W (1962, 1964)
- US Open: W (1965, 1966, 1969)

Grand Slam mixed doubles results
- Australian Open: W (1962, 1969)
- French Open: F (1962, 1963, 1964)
- Wimbledon: W (1961, 1964, 1969)
- US Open: W (1962, 1965)

Frederick Sydney Stolle, AO (8 October 1938 – 5 March 2025) was an Australian amateur world No. 1 tennis player and commentator. He was born in Hornsby, New South Wales, Australia. He was the father of former Australian Davis Cup player Sandon Stolle.

== Career ==
Stolle is notable for being the only male player in history to have lost his first five Grand Slam singles finals, all but one were to Roy Emerson, the fifth of which he led by two sets to love. However, Stolle went on to win two Grand Slam tournament singles titles, the 1965 French Championships and the 1966 US Championships. At Wimbledon and the Australian Championships he finished as runner-up in these tournaments and losing to compatriot Roy Emerson on no fewer than five occasions. World Tennis magazine ranked Stolle world No. 1 amateur in 1966.

Stolle won ten Grand Slam doubles titles, partnering with compatriots Bob Hewitt (4 titles), Roy Emerson (4 titles), and Ken Rosewall (2 titles). In addition Stolle won 7 Grand Slam mixed doubles titles.

As a member of the Australian Davis Cup team Stolle won the Davis Cup title in 1964, 1965 and 1966. In 1964 Stolle and Emerson were briefly suspended from the Australian Davis Cup team for going on an overseas tour in defiance of a Lawn Tennis Association of Australia order to remain in Australia until April.

Stolle turned professional in 1966, and as a professional, won two singles and 13 doubles titles. He earned about US$500,000 in career prize money.

Stolle coached Vitas Gerulaitis from 1977 until 1983.

== Later life and death ==
For many years, Stolle did television commentary for ESPN and other tennis broadcasts. He provided commentary on Grand Slam tennis tournaments for Australia's Fox Sports and the Nine Network.

Stolle died from cancer in Palm Desert, California, on 5 March 2025, at the age of 86.

== Honours ==
For his contribution to the tennis sport Stolle was inducted into the International Tennis Hall of Fame in 1985. In 1988 he was inducted into the Sport Australia Hall of Fame. He received an Australian Sports Medal in 2000 and was made an Officer of the Order of Australia in 2005. In 2020, Stolle was awarded the ITF Philippe Chatrier Award, for his contribution to tennis both during his career and post-retirement.

== Grand Slam finals ==
=== Singles: 8 (2 titles / 6 runners-up) ===
Result	Year	Championship	Surface	Opponent	Score
Loss	1963	Wimbledon	Grass	(United States) Chuck McKinley	7–9, 1–6, 4–6
Loss	1964	Australian Championships	Grass	(Australia) Roy Emerson	3–6, 4–6, 2–6
Loss	1964	Wimbledon	Grass	(Australia) Roy Emerson	1–6, 10–12, 6–4, 3–6
Loss	1964	U.S. Championships	Grass	(Australia) Roy Emerson	4–6, 2–6, 4–6
Loss	1965	Australian Championships	Grass	(Australia) Roy Emerson	9–7, 6–2, 4–6, 5–7, 1–6
Win	1965	French Championships	Clay	(Australia) Tony Roche	3–6, 6–0, 6–2, 6–3
Loss	1965	Wimbledon	Grass	(Australia) Roy Emerson	2–6, 4–6, 4–6
Win	1966	U.S. Championships	Grass	(Australia) John Newcombe	4–6, 12–10, 6–3, 6–4

=== Doubles: 16 (10 titles / 6 runners-up) ===
Result	Year	Championship	Surface	Partner	Opponents	Score
Loss	1961	Wimbledon	Grass	(Australia) Bob Hewitt	(Australia) Roy Emerson (Australia) Neale Fraser	4–6, 8–6, 4–6, 8–6, 6–8
Loss	1962	Australian Championships	Grass	(Australia) Bob Hewitt	(Australia) Roy Emerson (Australia) Neale Fraser	6–4, 6–4, 1–6, 4–6, 9–11
Win	1962	Wimbledon	Grass	(Australia) Bob Hewitt	(Socialist Federal Republic of Yugoslavia) Boro Jovanović (Socialist Federal Republic of Yugoslavia) Nikola Pilić	6–2, 5–7, 6–2, 6–4
Win	1963	Australian Championships	Grass	(Australia) Bob Hewitt	(Australia) Ken Fletcher (Australia) John Newcombe	6–2, 3–6, 6–3, 3–6, 6–3
Win	1964	Australian Championships	Grass	(Australia) Bob Hewitt	(Australia) Roy Emerson (Australia) Ken Fletcher	6–4, 7–5, 3–6, 4–6, 14–12
Win	1964	Wimbledon	Grass	(Australia) Bob Hewitt	(Australia) Roy Emerson (Australia) Ken Fletcher	7–5, 11–9, 6–4
Loss	1965	Australian Championships	Grass	(Australia) Roy Emerson	(Australia) John Newcombe (Australia) Tony Roche	6–3, 6–4, 11–13, 3–6, 4–6
Win	1965	French Championships	Clay	(Australia) Roy Emerson	(Australia) Ken Fletcher (Australia) Bob Hewitt	6–8, 6–3, 8–6, 6–2
Win	1965	U.S. Championships	Grass	(Australia) Roy Emerson	(United States) Frank Froehling (United States) Charles Pasarell	6–4, 10–12, 7–5, 6–3
Win	1966	Australian Championships	Grass	(Australia) Roy Emerson	(Australia) John Newcombe (Australia) Tony Roche	7–9, 6–3, 6–8, 14–12, 12–10
Win	1966	US Championships	Grass	(Australia) Roy Emerson	(United States) Clark Graebner (United States) Dennis Ralston	6–4, 6–4, 6–4
↓ Open Era ↓
Win	1968	French Open	Clay	(Australia) Ken Rosewall	(Australia) Roy Emerson (Australia) Rod Laver	6–3, 6–4, 6–3
Loss	1968	Wimbledon	Grass	(Australia) Ken Rosewall	(Australia) John Newcombe (Australia) Tony Roche	6–3, 6–8, 7–5, 12–14, 3–6
Loss	1969	Australian Open	Grass	(Australia) Ken Rosewall	(Australia) Rod Laver (Australia) Roy Emerson	4–6, 4–6
Win	1969	US Open	Grass	(Australia) Ken Rosewall	(United States) Charles Pasarell (United States) Dennis Ralston	2–6, 7–5, 13–11, 6–3
Loss	1970	Wimbledon	Grass	(Australia) Ken Rosewall	(Australia) John Newcombe (Australia) Tony Roche	8–10, 3–6, 1–6

=== Mixed doubles: 11 (6 titles / 5 runners-up) ===
Result	Year	Championship	Surface	Partner	Opponents	Score
Win	1961	Wimbledon	Grass	(Australia) Lesley Turner	(West Germany) Edda Buding (Australia) Bob Howe	11–9, 6–2
Win	1962	Australian Championships	Grass	(Australia) Lesley Turner	(United States) Darlene Hard (United Kingdom) Roger Taylor	6–3, 9–4
Loss	1962	French Championships	Clay	(Australia) Lesley Turner	(South Africa) Renée Schuurman (Australia) Bob Howe	6–3, 4–6, 4–6
Win	1962	U.S. Championships	Grass	(Australia) Margaret Smith	(United States) Frank Froehling (Australia) Lesley Turner	7–5, 6–2
Loss	1963	Australian Championships	Grass	(Australia) Lesley Turner	(Australia) Margaret Smith (Australia) Ken Fletcher	5–7, 7–5, 4–6
Loss	1963	French Championships	Clay	(Australia) Lesley Turner	(Australia) Margaret Smith (Australia) Ken Fletcher	1–6, 2–6
Loss	1964	French Championships	Clay	(Australia) Lesley Turner	(Australia) Margaret Smith (Australia) Ken Fletcher	3–6, 6–4, 6–8
Win	1964	Wimbledon	Grass	(Australia) Lesley Turner	(Australia) Margaret Smith (Australia) Ken Fletcher	6–4, 6–4
Win	1965	U.S. Championships	Grass	(Australia) Margaret Smith	(United States) Frank Froehling (Australia) Judy Tegart	6–2, 6–2
↓ Open Era ↓
Win	1969	Wimbledon	Grass	(United Kingdom) Ann Haydon-Jones	(Australia) Judy Tegart (Australia) Tony Roche	6–2, 6–3
Loss	1975	US Open	Clay	(United States) Billie Jean King	(United States) Rosemary Casals (United States) Richard Stockton	3–6, 6–7

== Open Era finals ==
=== Doubles: 22 (10 titles / 12 runner-ups) ===
Result	W-L	Date	Tournament	Surface	Partner	Opponents	Score
Win	1–0	Jun 1968	French Open, Paris	Clay	(Australia) Ken Rosewall	(Australia) Roy Emerson (Australia) Rod Laver	6–3, 6–4, 6–3
Loss	1–1	Jul 1968	Wimbledon, London	Grass	(Australia) Ken Rosewall	(Australia) John Newcombe (Australia) Tony Roche	6–3, 6–8, 7–5, 12–14, 3–6
Win	2–1	Sep 1968	Los Angeles, US	Hard	(Australia) Ken Rosewall	(South Africa) Cliff Drysdale (United Kingdom) Roger Taylor	7–5, 6–1
Loss	2–2	Jan 1969	Hobart, Australia	Grass	(Australia) Tony Roche	(Australia) Mal Anderson (United Kingdom) Roger Taylor	5–7, 3–6, 6–4, 6–1, 4–6
Loss	2–3	Jan 1969	Australian Open, Melbourne	Grass	(Australia) Ken Rosewall	(Australia) Roy Emerson (Australia) Rod Laver	4–6, 4–6
Win	3–3	Sep 1969	US Open, New York	Grass	(Australia) Ken Rosewall	(United States) Charlie Pasarell (United States) Dennis Ralston	2–6, 7–5, 13–11, 6–3
Loss	3–4	Apr 1970	Dallas WCT, US	Carpet	(Australia) Ken Rosewall	(Australia) Roy Emerson (Australia) Warren Jacques	4–6, 8–6, 4–6
Loss	3–5	Jul 1970	Wimbledon, London	Grass	(Australia) Ken Rosewall	(Australia) John Newcombe (Australia) Tony Roche	8–10, 3–6, 1–6
Loss	3–6	Aug 1970	Toronto, Canada	Clay	(South Africa) Cliff Drysdale	(Australia) Bill Bowrey (United States) Marty Riessen	3–6, 2–6
Loss	3–7	Oct 1971	Berkeley, US	Hard	(Australia) Ken Rosewall	(Australia) Roy Emerson (Australia) Rod Laver	3–6, 3–6
Win	4–7	Nov 1971	Bologna WCT, Italy	Carpet	(Australia) Ken Rosewall	(South Africa) Robert Maud (South Africa) Frew McMillan	6–7, 6–2, 6–3, 6–3
Loss	4–8	Apr 1972	Houston WCT, US	Clay	(Australia) Ken Rosewall	(Australia) Roy Emerson (Australia) Rod Laver	3–6, 3–6
Win	5–8	Jul 1972	Bretton Woods, US	Hard	(Australia) John Alexander	(Socialist Federal Republic of Yugoslavia) Nikola Pilić (United States) Cliff Richey	7–6, 7–6
Loss	5–9	Aug 1972	Fort Worth, US	Hard	(Australia) Ken Rosewall	(Netherlands) Tom Okker (United States) Marty Riessen	2–6, 2–6
Win	6–9	Oct 1972	Vancouver WCT, Canada	Outdoor	(Australia) John Newcombe	(South Africa) Cliff Drysdale (Australia) Allan Stone	7–6, 6–0
Win	7–9	Dec 1972	Johannesburg-2, South Africa	Hard	(Australia) John Newcombe	(Australia) Terry Addison (Australia) Bob Carmichael	6–3, 6–4
Loss	7–10	Feb 1973	Milan WCT, Italy	Carpet	(Australia) Ken Rosewall	(Netherlands) Tom Okker (United States) Marty Riessen	3–6, 3–6
Win	8–10	Mar 1973	Chicago WCT, US	Carpet	(Australia) Ken Rosewall	(Egypt) Ismail El Shafei (New Zealand) Brian Fairlie	6–7, 6–4, 6–2
Win	9–10	Apr 1973	Cleveland WCT, US	Carpet	(Australia) Ken Rosewall	(Egypt) Ismail El Shafei (New Zealand) Brian Fairlie	6–2, 6–3
Loss	9–11	May 1973	Las Vegas, US	Hard	(Australia) Ken Rosewall	(United States) Brian Gottfried (Australia) Dick Stockton	7–6, 4–6, 4–6
Win	10–11	Jul 1973	Bretton Woods, US	Clay	(Australia) Rod Laver	(Australia) Bob Carmichael (South Africa) Frew McMillan	7–6, 4–6, 7–5
Loss	10–12	Nov 1982	Baltimore, US	Carpet	(India) Vijay Amritraj	(India) Anand Amritraj (United States) Tony Giammalva	5–7, 2–6

== Performance timeline ==
Key
W	F	SF	QF	#R	RR	Q#	DNQ	A	NH

(W) winner; (F) finalist; (SF) semifinalist; (QF) quarterfinalist; (#R) rounds 4, 3, 2, 1; (RR) round-robin stage; (Q#) qualification round; (DNQ) did not qualify; (A) absent; (NH) not held; (SR) strike rate (events won / competed); (W–L) win–loss record.

=== Singles ===
	1958	1959	1960	1961	1962	1963	1964	1965	1966	1967	1968	1969	1970	1971	1972	1973	1974	1975	1976	1977		1978	SR	W–L	Win %
Grand Slam tournaments																							2 / 41	102–39	72.3
Australian Open	1R	A	1R	SF	QF	SF	F	F	SF	A	A	QF	A	3R	A	A	A	A	A	A	A	A	0 / 10	23–10	69.7
French Open	A	A	2R	3R	4R	2R	4R	W	QF	A	2R	QF	A	A	A	A	A	A	A	A		A	1 / 9	23–8	74.2
Wimbledon	A	A	1R	2R	3R	F	F	F	2R	A	4R	4R	1R	4R	A	A	A	A	A	A		1R	0 / 12	31–12	72.1
US Open	A	A	A	A	2R	A	F	2R	W	A	2R	QF	3R	A	QF	A	A	1R	A	2R		A	1 / 10	25–9	73.5
Pro Slam tournaments																							0 / 3	4–3	57.1
U.S. Pro	A	A	A	A	A	A	A	A	A	SF	Not a Major												0 / 1	2–1	66.7
French Pro	A	A	A	A	A	A	A	A	A	SF	Not a Major												0 / 1	2–1	66.7
Wembley Pro	A	A	A	A	A	A	A	A	A	1R	Not a Major												0 / 1	0–1	0.0
Win–loss	0–1		0–3	6–3	8–4	9–3	19–4	18–3	15–3	4–3	4–3	13–4	1–2	4–2	4–1			0–1		1–1		0–1	2 / 41	106–42	71.6

Note: The Australian Open was held twice in 1977, in January and December.
