= Geoff Hughes =

Australian tennis player

- Country (sports): Australia
- Born: 1939
- Turned pro: 1961
- Retired: 1962
- Plays: Right-handed

Singles
- Career record: 2-1
- Career titles: 1

Grand Slam singles results
- French Open: QF (1962)

Geoffrey J. Hughes (born 1939) is a former Australian tennis player who became active in 1961 until he retired in 1962.

== Career ==
He reached the quarter-finals at the 1962 French Championships, he played the qualifications with John Newcombe in men's singles in 8–6, 6–3, 6–3 then with Italian Nicola Pietrangeli (2–6, 6–0, 0–6, 3–6). Hughes also played at the Queen's Club Championships such as cities in Brussels, Monte Carlo, Rome, in Germany and Pays-Bas. He also played the titles with Noel Holland in August 1961 at Le Touquet, France and finals with Barry Phillips-Moore in 1961 and 1962.
