= Carlos Fernandes (tennis) =

Brazilian tennis player

- Full name: Carlos Alberto "Lele" Fernandes
- Country (sports): Brazil
- Born: 6 February 1936 (age 89); São Paulo, Brazil
- Turned pro: 1955 (amateur tour)
- Retired: 1970

Singles
- Career record: 200–159
- Career titles: 7

Grand Slam singles results
- French Open: QF (1961)
- Wimbledon: 2R (1959, 1960, 1961, 1964)

Carlos Alberto Fernandes (born 6 February 1936) is a retired Brazilian tennis player. He had a good all-round game with excellent passing shots and moved fast around the court. Fernandes had a reputation for being a charismatic ladies man. He later became a coach.

== Career ==
He made his Grand Slam debut at Wimbledon 1957, losing in the opening round to Jorgen Ulrich. At Roland Garros in 1958, Fernandes lost in round one to Pierre Darmon. At Wimbledon he lost in round one to Butch Buchholz. At 1959 French Open, Fernandes lost in round three to Jacques Brichant. At Wimbledon he lost in round two to Neale Fraser. At French Open 1960, Fernandes lost in round three to Bobby Wilson and at Wimbledon lost in round two to Wolfgang Stuck. At 1961 French Open, Fernandes achieved his best Grand Slam singles result by beating Pierre Darmon and Bob Hewitt before losing to Jan-Erik Lundqvist in the quarter-finals. He lost in round two of Wimbledon to Wilson. At Roland Garros 1962, Fernandes lost to Lundqvist in round two. At Wimbledon he lost in round one to Neale Fraser's brother John. At 1963 French Open he lost in round one to Christian Duxin. In round one of Wimbledon he led a young Arthur Ashe by two sets to 0, but lost in five sets. At Wimbledon 1964 he lost in round two to Gene Scott. An ankle injury in 1964 took its toll and Fernandes played less after that.

As Open tennis arrived, Fernandes was reaching the end of his career. He lost in round one of 1968 French Open to Bernard Montrenaud. At Wimbledon he lost in round one to Mike Sangster.
