= Geoffrey Pares =

Australian tennis player

- Country (sports): Australia

Singles

Grand Slam singles results
- Australian Open: 3R (1962)
- French Open: 2R (1962)
- Wimbledon: 2R (1961, 1962)

Geoffrey Pares is a former Australian tennis player who competed 1959–1967.
