= Patricio Rodríguez =

Chilean tennis player (1938–2020)

Pato Rodríguez
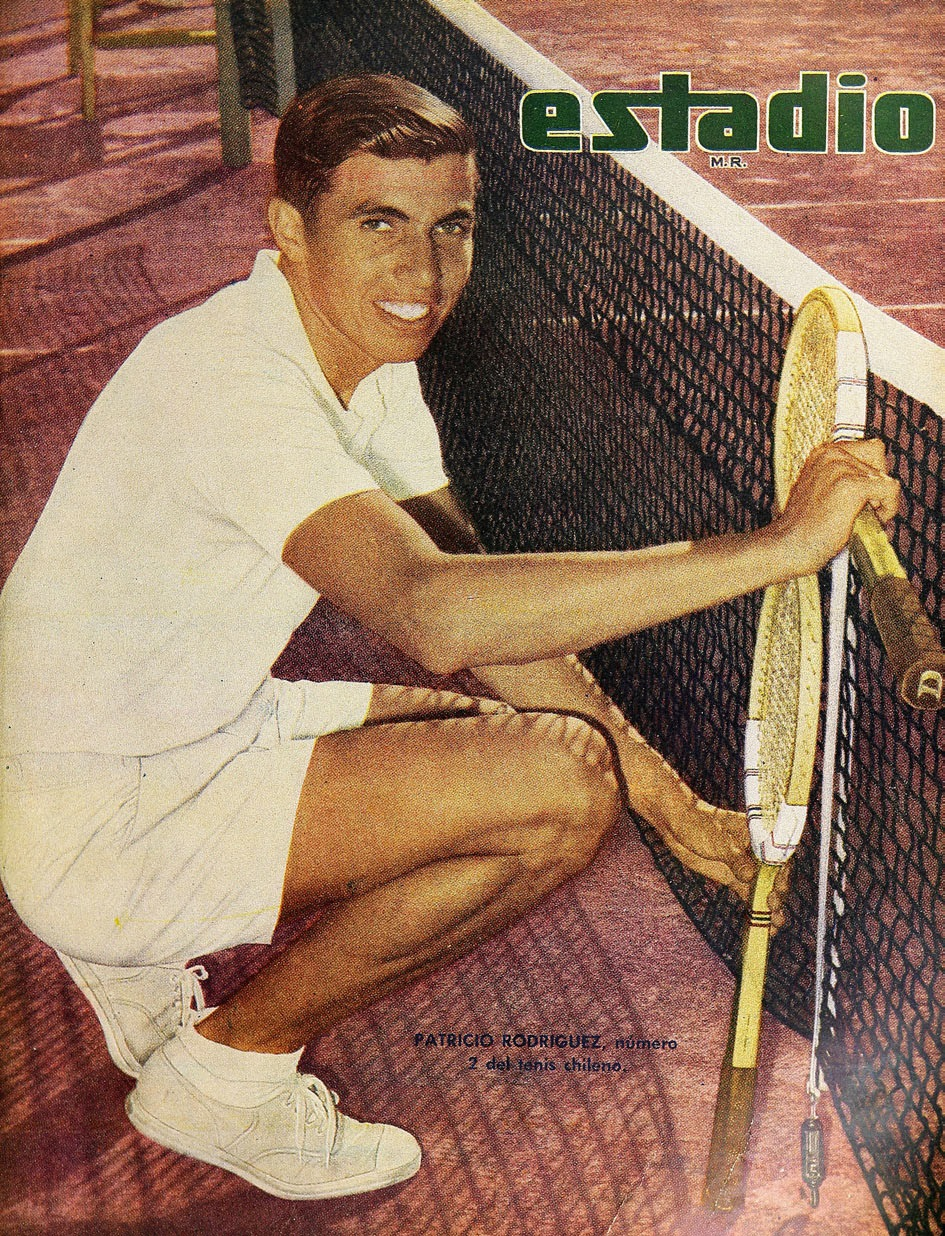
- Full name: Patricio Rodríguez
- Country (sports): Chile
- Born: 20 December 1938 Santiago, Chile
- Died: 26 June 2020 (age 82) Santiago, Chile
- Turned pro: 1956 (amateur)
- Retired: 1979

Singles
- Career record: 346–331
- Career titles: 25

Grand Slam singles results
- Australian Open: 2R (1966)
- French Open: 3R (1960), (1963)
- Wimbledon: 2R (1959)
- US Open: 3R (1964 )

Doubles
- Career titles: 2

Patricio (Pato) Rodríguez (20 December 1938 — 23 June 2020) was a professional tennis player from Chile. He was active from 1956 until 1979 and won 25 career singles titles. In addition he won 2 doubles titles.

== Career ==
Rodríguez was born in Santiago, Chile. In 1956 he played his first tournament at the South American Championships. In 1959 he won his first title at the Bad Neuenahr Open at Bad Neuenahr-Ahrweiler, Germany.

He also played in tennis Grand Slams and competed for his country in the Davis Cup in the 1960s and the 1970s. In 1970 he won the last of his 23 career singles titles at Pörtschach Championships. In 1970 he won his final singles title at the Pörtschach Championships. In 1979 he played his last singles event at the Vina Del Mar tournament at Valparaíso, Chile.

He also won two ATP doubles titles.

== Career finals ==
=== Singles titles (25) ===
(incomplete roll)

Result	No.	Date	Tournament	Location	Surface	Opponent	Score
Win	1.	Aug 1959	Bad Neuenahr Open	Bad Neuenahr-Ahrweiler	Clay	(West Germany) Ernst Buchholz	6–2, 7–5, 6–3
Win	2.	Jul 1960	Bremen Clay Courts	Bremen	Clay	(Colombia) Bill Álvarez	6–3, 6–0, 6–3.
Win	3.	Jul 1961	Bad Reichenhall Clay Courts	Bad Reichenhall	Clay	(Australia) Alan E.G. Bailey	6–2, 4–6, 2–6, 6–1, 6–0.
Win	4.	Jun 1961	Worcestershire Championships	Malvern	Grass	(Venezuela) Isaías Pimentel	6–2, 7–5, 6–3.
Win	5.	Jun 1961	Ulster Grass Court Championships	Belfast	Grass	(Republic of Ireland) Peter Jackson	6–3, 5–7, 6–3.
Win	6.	Aug 1961	Bagneres de Bigorre Tournament	Bagneres de Bigorre	Clay	(Tunisia) Bernard Boutboul	4–6, 2–6, 6–2, 6–3, 6–0.
Win	7.	Aug 1961	USSR International Championships	Moscow	Clay	(Soviet Union) Toomas Leius	0–6, 5–7, 6–3, 6–4, 6–4.
Win	8.	Jul 1962	Sporting Club de Lyon	Lyon	Clay	(Australia) Alan Lane	6–1, 6–1.
Win	9.	Aug 1962	Adelboden International	Adelboden	Clay	(Brazil) Jorge Paulo Lemann	2–6, 3–6, 10–8, 6–3, 6–4.
Win	10.	Mar 1963	Kingston International Invitation	Kingston	Clay	(United Kingdom) Michael Sangster	4–6, 7–5, 6–3.
Win	11.	Aug 1963	Bavarian International Championships	Munich	Clay	(Socialist Federal Republic of Yugoslavia) Nikola Pilić	1–6, 4–6, 7–5, 9–7, 6–2.
Win	12.	Nov 1964	Chilean National Championships	Santiago	Clay	(Argentina) Roberto Aubone	4–6, 7-5, 6-3.
Win	13.	Jul 1965	Gstaad International	Gstaad	Clay	(Brazil) Thomaz Koch	2–6, 6–3, 6–2, 6–2.
Win	14.	Aug 1965	Évian-les-Bains International	Évian-les-Bains	Clay	(Ecuador) Eduardo Zuleta	8–6, 6–2.
Win	15.	Sep 1965	Czech International Championships	Bratislava	Clay	(Hungary) Istvan Gulyas	6–3, 6–3, 6–4.
Win	16.	Jul 1966	Tournoi International d'Enghien	Enghien	Clay	(France) Bernard Montrenaud	6–3, 7–5.
Win	17.	Oct 1966	Torneo Fiestas Patrias	Valparaiso	Clay	(Chile) Jaime Pinto Bravo	6–1, 6–1, 6–1.
Win	18.	Dec 1966	Chile International Championships	Valparaiso	Clay	(Chile) Jaime Pinto Bravo	6–4, 3–6, 6–2, 6–4.
Win	19.	Aug 1967	Tournoi d'Arcachon	Arcachon	Clay	(Australia) John Cottrill	6–0, 6–4.
Win	25.	Aug 1970	Pörtschach Championships	Pörtschach am Wörthersee	Clay	(Chile) Jaime Pinto Bravo	6–3, 3–6, 6–1.

=== Doubles titles (2) ===
Result	No.	Date	Tournament	Surface	Partner	Opponents	Score
Win	1.	Jun 1968	Barcelona, Spain	Clay	(Brazil) Carlos Fernandes	(Brazil) Thomaz Koch (Brazil) José Edison Mandarino	6–2, 3–6, 3–6, 6–1, 6–4
Win	2.	Oct 1969	Barcelona, Spain	Clay	(Spain) Manuel Orantes	(Australia) Terry Addison (Australia) Ray Keldie	8–10, 6–3, 6–1, 5–7, 6–2
