= Mustapha Belkhodja =

Tunisian tennis player

- Country (sports): Tunisia
- Born: 16 April 1938 (age 87)
- Plays: Right-handed

Singles

Grand Slam singles results
- French Open: 3R (1961, 1963)
- Wimbledon: 3R (1961)
- US Open: 2R (1962)
Medal record
All-Africa Games
Gold medal – first place	1965 Brazzaville	Singles

Mustapha Belkhodja (born 16 April 1938) is a Tunisian former tennis player.

Belkhodja was the boys' singles champion at the 1956 French Championships and had to beat Rod Laver to win the title. In 1961 he reached the men's singles third round of the Wimbledon Championships, defeating two British players en route. He registered career wins over Clark Graebner (in 1962) and John Newcombe (in 1963).
