= Jacques Brichant =

Belgian tennis player (1930–2011)

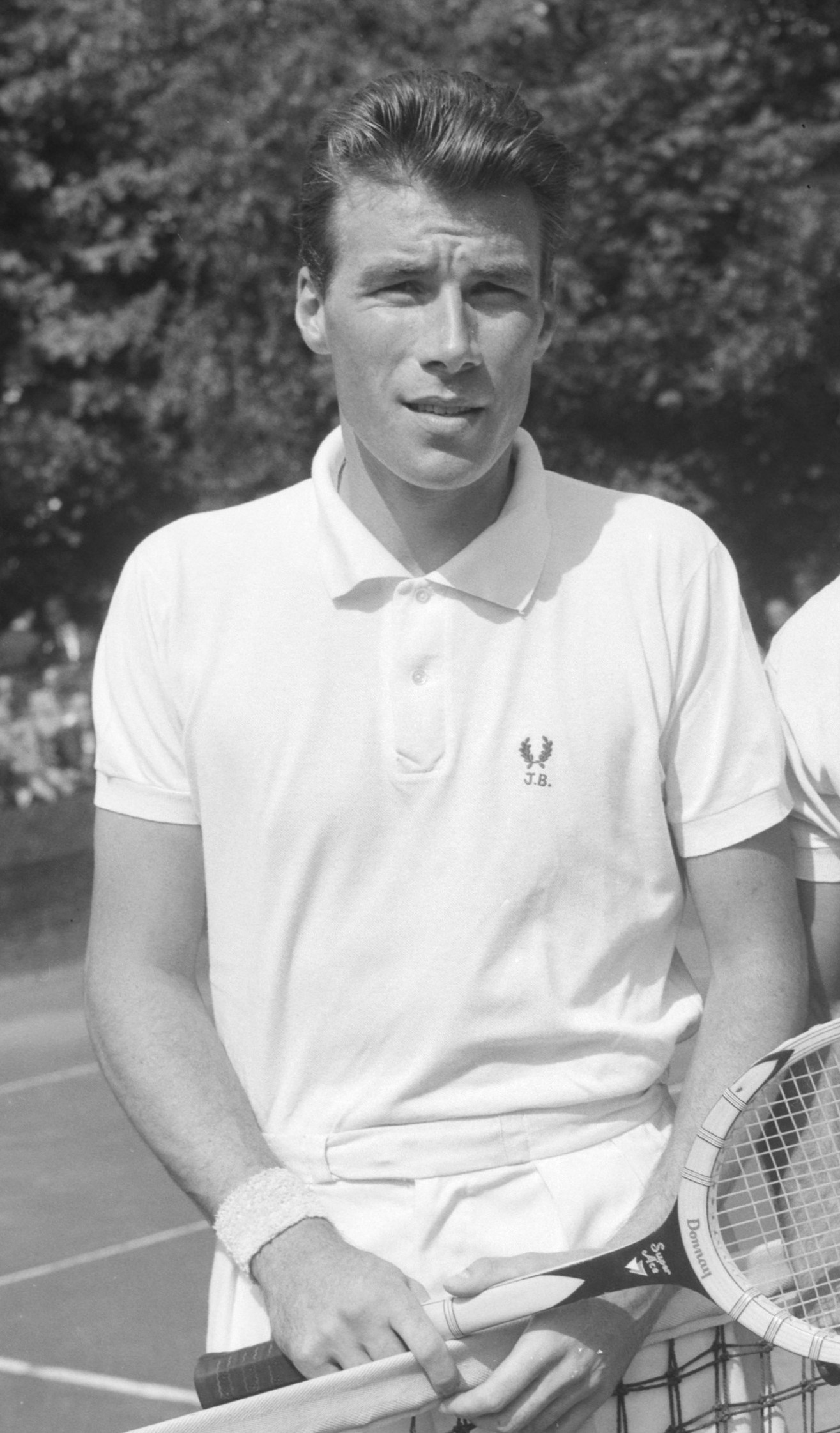
- Jacques Brichant in 1959
- Country (sports): Belgium
- Born: 28 March 1930 Mont-sur-Marchienne, Belgium
- Died: 9 March 2011 (aged 80)
- Turned pro: 1947 (amateur tour)
- Retired: 1968
- Plays: Right-handed (one-handed backhand)

Singles
- Career record: 384–163
- Career titles: 54
- Highest ranking: 9 (1957)

Grand Slam singles results
- French Open: SF (1958)
- Wimbledon: 4R (1952, 1953, 1954)
- US Open: 3R (1952)

Doubles

Grand Slam doubles results
- Wimbledon: SF (1953)

Grand Slam mixed doubles results
- Wimbledon: 3R (1952)

Jacques "Jacky" Brichant (28 March 1930 – 9 March 2011) was a Belgian tennis player. He was ranked world No. 9 for 1957. Brichant was a clay court specialist and won many clay court tournaments in Europe.

Brichant has played the most Davis Cup ties for his country. Brichant reached the semi-finals of the French Championships in singles in 1958 which he lost to eventual champion Mervyn Rose. Additionally he reached the French quarter-finals three times (1956, 1957, 1959). He won the national Belgian title 10 times.

In 1950 he was the runner-up at the All England Plate event, a tennis competition held at the Wimbledon Championships consisting of players who were defeated in the first or second rounds of the singles competition.

Brichant won the 1957 Monte Carlo Championships on clay defeating Hugh Stewart in the semifinal and Paul Rémy in the final. He also won the 1957 South of France Championships at Nice on clay defeating Pierre Darmon in the semifinal and Bobby Wilson in a long five set final. In 1960 he won the Biarritz International Championships against Jean-Noël Grinda.
