= Bobby Wilson (tennis) =

British tennis player (1935–2020)

- Full name: Robert Keith Wilson
- Country (sports): United Kingdom
- Residence: Finchley, Middlesex, England
- Born: 22 November 1935; Hendon, Middlesex, England
- Died: 21 September 2020 (aged 84)
- Turned pro: 1952 (amateur)
- Retired: 1975
- Plays: Right-handed (one-handed backhand)

Singles
- Career record: 670–257 (72.2%)
- Career titles: 56

Grand Slam singles results
- Australian Open: 3R (1968)
- French Open: QF (1963)
- Wimbledon: QF (1958, 1959, 1961, 1963)
- US Open: QF (1960, 1963)

Doubles
- Career record: 9–10

Grand Slam doubles results
- Wimbledon: F (1960)

Robert Keith Wilson (22 November 1935 – 21 September 2020) was an English tennis player. Wilson reached the quarterfinals of Wimbledon four times, Forest Hills twice, and Roland Garros once during the late 1950s and early 1960s. He was also a prominent Great Britain Davis Cup team member.

== Grand Slam tournaments ==
Wilson was a champion junior player, winning the 1951 British Junior Championship at age 15. He was runner-up the following two years as well as doubles champion partnering Billy Knight. While still a junior Wilson won a senior level singles match at Wimbledon in 1952, then he lost to eventual runner-up Jaroslav Drobný in the second round; the following year, he reached the third round, where he lost to eventual quarterfinalist Sven Davidson in five sets.

Wilson first reached a major quarterfinal in 1958, at Wimbledon. Unseeded, he reached the round without dropping a set, setting up a meeting against No. 1 seed Ashley Cooper. The champion Australian took the first two sets handily before Wilson levelled the match at two sets apiece. The deciding set was closely contested with eventual champion Cooper prevailing 7–5. Wilson, seeded No. 4, reached the same stage the following summer but went out without much of a stir to Roy Emerson in straight sets.

1960 saw Wilson, the No. 8 seed, reach the quarterfinals at the U.S. Nationals in his fourth appearance at Forest Hills. He then met No. 2 seed Rod Laver. Despite hanging close in the opening set, Wilson went down easily in three straight sets. Wilson reached the quarterfinals again at Wimbledon the following summer. He barely survived his first round match versus Argentine Eduardo Soriano, coming back from two sets to one down to prevail, 6–2, 4–6, 5–7, 16–14, 6–3. Two rounds later, Wilson scored perhaps the biggest match victory of his career, dispatching No. 1 seed Neale Fraser 1–6, 6–0, 13–11, 9–7. The following round, however, proved once again to be a roadblock for Wilson as he went out to No. 8 seed Chuck McKinley in four sets.

1963 proved to be Wilson's best year as he reached the quarterfinals at Roland Garros, Wimbledon, and Forest Hills. In Paris, Wilson, as he often did when he went far into tournaments, breezed through the first four rounds, including a round of 16 win over No. 6 seed Bob Hewitt. However, he went out rather easily in the next round, this time to French champion and No. 3 seed Pierre Darmon. A month later, again unseeded, Wilson made it to the quarterfinals, but was easily beaten by the No. 4 seed Chuck McKinley. His success for the year saw him seeded No. 6 at Forest Hills and he reached the quarterfinals. His opponent this time, however, was not a big name, unseeded Frank Froehling. Taking the first two sets, Wilson looked primed to reach his first major semifinal, but he lost the next two sets. Froehling took the deciding set too, however, by a score of 9 games to 7, saving a match point to do so.

Even when past his prime, Wilson continued to compete at Wimbledon, often in doubles. He took eventual finalist Wilhelm Bungert to 7–9 in the fifth set of their fourth round encounter in 1967 and in 1969 reached the fourth round, for the last time, in both singles and doubles. His final Wimbledon was in 1977, where aged 41 he played in the mixed doubles and lost in the first round; he played just in the doubles draw from 1971 onward. Overall he played in 124 matches at Wimbledon winning 77 and losing 47. In 1975 he played his last tournament at the Northumberland Championships.

His other career singles highlights include winning the Palace Hotel Covered Courts Championships six times (1957–60, 1962, 1967), the Cumberland Hard Court Championships six times (1956, 1958, 1960, 1965, 1968–69), the British Covered Court Championships four times (1959, 1962–63, 1965), the German International Covered Court Championships three times (1961–62, 1964), the North of England Championships three times (1953–54, 1956), the French Covered Court Championships two times (1964–65), and the Irish Championships two times (1963–64). Single tournament wins came at the Scottish Championships (1954), the Welsh Championships (1959), the Midland Counties Championships (1960), the Scandinavian Covered Court Championships (1966), Coupe Albert Canet (1965), the Essex Championships (1967).

== Davis Cup ==
Between 1955 and 1968, Wilson participated in 34 ties for the British Davis Cup team. He compiled a record of 40 wins versus 20 losses and had a better record in doubles (25–8) than singles (16–12). The most successful year was 1963 when the British team won the Europe Zone, defeating Sweden in the final, to reach the Inter-Zonal semifinal against the United States.

== Grand Slam finals ==
=== Doubles (1 runner-up) ===
Result	Year	Championship	Surface	Partner	Opponents	Score
Loss	1960	Wimbledon	Grass	(United Kingdom) Mike Davies	(United States) Dennis Ralston (Mexico) Rafael Osuna	5–7, 3–6, 8–10

== Junior Grand Slam titles ==
=== Singles: 1 ===
Result	Year	Championship	Surface	Opponent	Score
Win	1952	Wimbledon	Grass	(South Africa) Trevor Fancutt	6–3, 6–3

== Post-playing career ==
Wilson coached locally in his post-tour days. He was still doing so in 2018 at the age of 82.

== Personal ==
He was one of many signatories in a letter to The Times on 17 July 1958 opposing "the policy of apartheid" in international sport and defending "the principle of racial equality which is embodied in the Declaration of the Olympic Games".

In 1964, Wilson published a book titled My Side of the Net. As of 1981, Wilson was a resident of Finchley, north London, where he also lived as a boy.
