= Abe Segal =

South African tennis player

- Full name: Alan Abraham Segal
- Country (sports): South Africa
- Born: 23 October 1930 Johannesburg, South Africa
- Died: 4 April 2016 (aged 85) Cape Town, South Africa
- Plays: Left-handed (one-handed backhand)

Grand Slam singles results
- Australian Open: 2R (1954)
- French Open: 3R (1955, 1957, 1961, 1962)
- Wimbledon: QF (1964)
- US Open: 4R (1956)

Grand Slam doubles results
- Australian Open: QF (1954)
- French Open: F (1958, 1963)
- Wimbledon: SF (1963)

Grand Slam mixed doubles results
- Australian Open: QF (1964)
- Wimbledon: QF (1964)

Team competitions
- Davis Cup: F^{Eu} (1965)

Alan Abraham Segal (23 October 1930 – 4 April 2016) was a South African tennis player.

== Early life and career ==
He was born in Johannesburg, South Africa, and was Jewish.

During the 1950s and 1960s, he was the doubles partner of Gordon Forbes. Together, they were considered one of the better doubles teams in the world.

He was critical of South Africa's policy of apartheid. Alex Metreveli and István Gulyás both refused to compete in the 1964 Wimbledon against Segal, a white South African, because of apartheid. In response, black tennis player Arthur Ashe said he would play Segal any time because he did not think politics had a place in sports. Weeks later, Segal played Ashe in Illinois, beating him. This prompted the International Lawn Tennis Federation to pass a resolution prohibiting racial discrimination and withdrawing from a tournament except for "health or bereavement" reasons.

In 1951, he won the singles title at the Irish Open, defeating Guy Jackson in the final in straight sets.

He played for the South African Davis Cup team in 19 ties in the years 1955, 1957, 1959, and 1961 to 1965, and he compiled a record of 24 wins and 14 losses.

After retiring from tennis, Segal took up painting. In 2008 he published a memoir titled Hey Big Boy!.

Segal died of cancer on 4 April 2016 at the age of 85.

== Grand Slam finals ==
=== Doubles (2 runner-ups) ===
Result	Year	Championship	Surface	Partner	Opponents	Score
Loss	1958	French Championships	Clay	(Australia) Robert Howe	(Australia) Ashley Cooper (Australia) Neale Fraser	6–3, 6–8, 3–6, 5–7
Loss	1963	French Championships	Clay	(South Africa) Gordon Forbes	(Australia) Roy Emerson (Spain) Manuel Santana	2–6, 4–6, 4–6

== See also ==
- List of select Jewish tennis players
