= José Edison Mandarino =

Brazilian tennis player

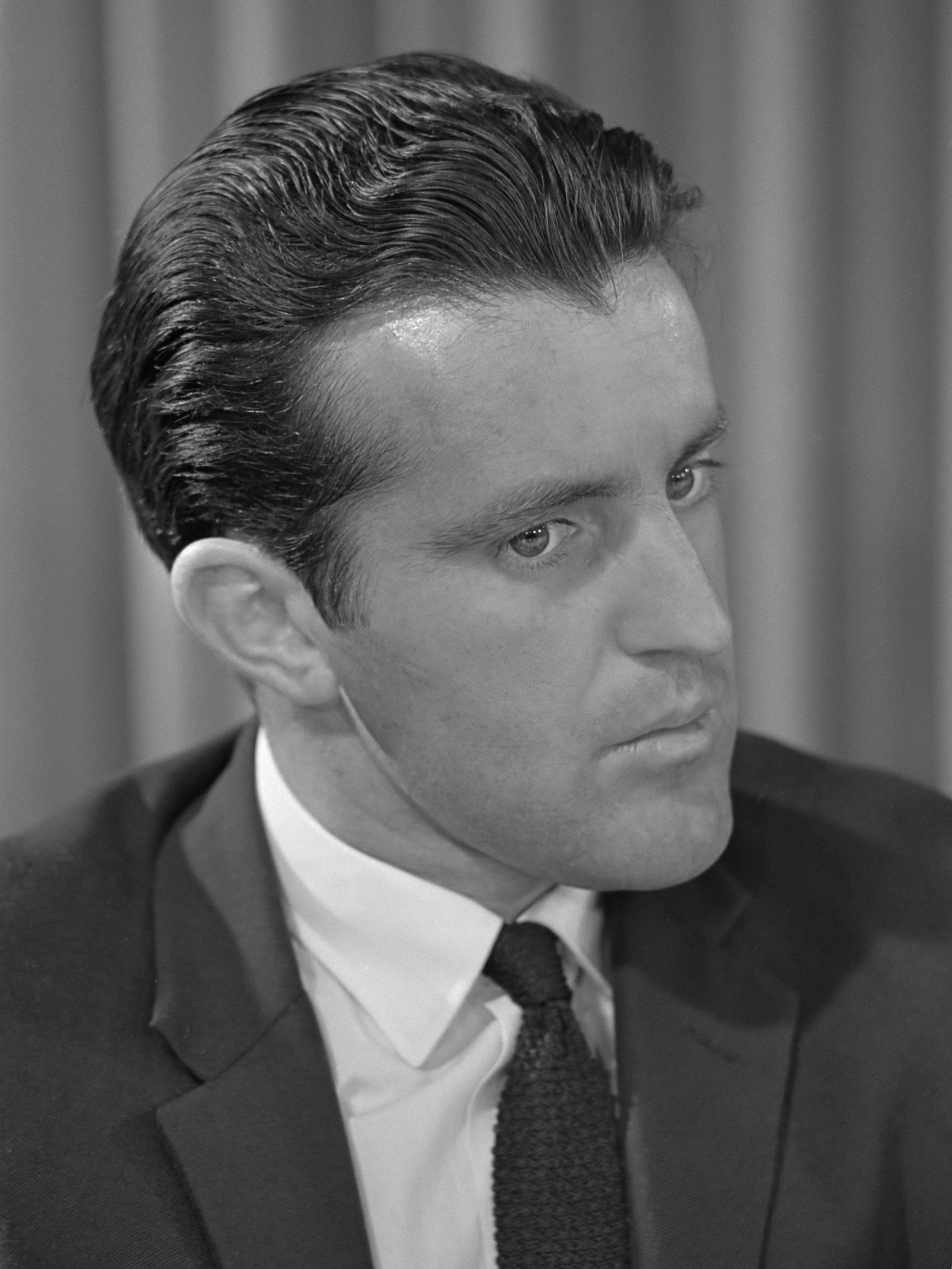
- Mandarino in 1968
- Country (sports): Brazil
- Born: March 26, 1941 (age 85) Jaguarão, Brazil
- Height: 5 ft 8 in (173 cm)

Singles
- Career record: 90–111
- Highest ranking: No. 81 (June 2, 1975)

Grand Slam singles results
- French Open: 3R (1960, 1964, 1965, 1966, 1968)
- Wimbledon: 3R (1967, 1968, 1970)
- US Open: 1R (1962)

Doubles
- Career record: 50–55
- Career titles: 2
- Highest ranking: No. 120 (December 12, 1976)

José Edison Mandarino (born March 26, 1941) is a former tennis player from Brazil.

Mandarino was born in Jaguarão. He reached the junior finals of the 1959 French Championships, defeated by German Ingo Buding. He played 109 matches for Brazil in the Davis Cup and is considered one of the players with the most appearances in this event. He won 68 (41 at singles and 27 at doubles) and lost 41 (31 at singles and 10 at doubles). In doubles, he played with Thomaz Koch as well as Carlos Fernandes.

After his successful career as a player, he coached the Spanish Davis Cup team.

Mandarino achieved a career-high singles ranking of world No. 81 which he reached on June 2, 1975 after losing to Anatoli Volkov at the French Open. This ranking was achieved at the end of his career with the start of the open era. However he was one of the top world players before an official ranking came out.

== Open Era career finals ==
=== Doubles: (2 titles / 2 runner-ups) ===
Result	W/L	Date	Tournament	Surface	Partner	Opponents	Score
Loss	0–1	Jun 1968	Barcelona, Spain	Clay	(Brazil) Thomaz Koch	(Brazil) Carlos Fernandes (Chile) Patricio Rodríguez	2–6, 6–3, 6–3, 1–6, 4–6
Win	1–1	Feb 1971	Caracas, Venezuela	Clay	(Brazil) Thomaz Koch	(United Kingdom) Gerald Battrick (United Kingdom) Peter Curtis	6–4, 3–6, 6–7, 6–4, 7–6
Loss	1–2	Jul 1973	Kitzbühel, Austria	Clay	(Argentina) Tito Vázquez	(United States) Jim McManus (Mexico) Raúl Ramírez	2–6, 2–6, 3–6
Win	2–2	Apr 1976	Madrid, Spain	Clay	(Brazil) Carlos Kirmayr	(United States) John Andrews (Australia) Colin Dibley	7–6, 4–6, 8–6
