= Jan-Erik Lundqvist =

Swedish tennis player

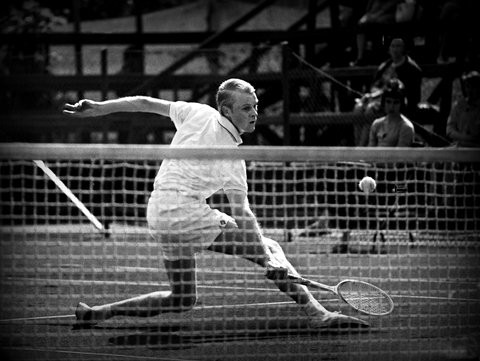
- Jan-Erik Lundqvist
- Country (sports): Sweden
- Residence: Stockholm, Sweden
- Born: 14 April 1937 (age 89) Stockholm, Sweden
- Height: 1.91 m (6 ft 3 in)
- Turned pro: 1952 (amateur tour)
- Retired: 1977
- Plays: Right-handed (one-handed backhand)

Singles
- Career titles: 52
- Highest ranking: No. 3 (1964, Lance Tingay)

Grand Slam singles results
- Australian Open: 3R (1959)
- French Open: SF (1961, 1964)
- Wimbledon: 4R (1960, 1963)
- US Open: 3R (1962)

Doubles

Grand Slam doubles results
- Australian Open: QF (1959)
- Wimbledon: 3R (1960)

Grand Slam mixed doubles results
- Wimbledon: 2R (1960, 1963)

Team competitions
- Davis Cup: F (1962, 1964)

Jan-Erik Lundqvist (born 14 April 1937) is a Swedish former international tennis player. During the entire 1960s he was Sweden's best tennis player.

At the height of his career, he won at least 35 international titles and played 91 Davis Cup-matches from 1957 to 1970.

Lundqvist was ranked among the 10 best amateur players (rankings made by leading tennis journalist Lance Tingay at the Daily Telegraph) in the world during most of the 1960s, reaching as high as world No. 3 in 1964.

Lundqvist declined professional offers from Jack Kramer in 1960 and 1965.

== Davis Cup anchor ==
The Swedish Davis Cup team with Lundqvist as anchor reached the Inter-Zonal final against Mexico in 1962 and Australia in 1964. Lundqvist is the most successful Davis Cup single player Sweden has ever had with his 47 wins.

== 35 international titles in 46 finals ==
In 1964 he won, among other titles, Italian Open and was ranked number 3 in the world after Roy Emerson and Fred Stolle.

In 1965 Lundqvist was appointed the best indoor player in the world after winning the National Indoor Championships (now the U.S. National Indoor Tennis Championships), French Open Indoors (1962, 1963, 1966), German Open Indoors, and Scandinavian Indoor Championships (1960, 1963, 1967, 1970).

Other major championships that Lundqvist won was the British Hard Court Championships in 1965 and 1967, the Pacific Coast Championships in 1962, the South American Outdoor Championships (nowadays the ATP Buenos Aires) in 1962 and the Swedish Open in 1963.

== Grand Slam tournaments ==
Lundqvist reached the semi-finals twice (1961 and 1964) at the French Open. Both times he lost to the Italian player Nicola Pietrangeli.

During 1958-1965 the official documentations say that Lundqvist participated 7 times in the French Open, 6 times in The Championships, Wimbledon, 1 time in US Open (tennis) and 1 time in Australian Open.

== Tennis career ==
As a tennis player, Jan-Erik was known for hitting the ball a long distance in front of the body. He could hit hard sliced and totally unreachable stop balls. He had his best successes on clay and indoor courts. He had in his strongest form in the beginning of the 1960s with few superiors on clay, defeating players such as Manuel Santana, Nicola Pietrangeli, Fred Stolle, Roy Emerson and Neale Fraser.

== See also ==
- List of Sweden Davis Cup team representatives
