= William Álvarez (tennis) =

Colombian-born Spanish tennis player and coach (1934–2022)

- Country (sports): Colombia
- Born: 15 December 1934; Medellín, Colombia
- Died: 23 January 2022 (aged 87); Barcelona, Spain
- Height: 5 ft 10 in (178 cm)

Singles

Grand Slam singles results
- French Open: 3R (1961)
- Wimbledon: 2R (1958, 1961)

William Álvarez (15 December 1934 – 23 January 2022) was a Colombian-born Spanish tennis coach and former professional player. He relocated to Spain in the 1970s and became a world acclaimed coach.

Born in Medellín, Álvarez was an eight-time Colombian national champion and a member of the country's Davis Cup team, debuting in 1959. Álvarez, who is known by his nickname of Pato, made the third round of the 1961 French Championships. In 1963 he missed out on an opportunity to make another Roland Garros third round when he was defaulted during his second round match for arguing with the umpire, while a set up against Martin Mulligan. He died on 23 January 2022, at the age of 87.
