= Gérard Pilet =

French tennis player

- Full name: Gérard Pilet
- Country (sports): France
- Born: 15 September 1933; Asnières-sur-Seine, France
- Died: 8 May 2011 (aged 77); France
- Turned pro: 1950 (amateur tour)
- Retired: 1971

Singles

Grand Slam singles results
- French Open: QF (1961)
- Wimbledon: 2R (1962)
- US Open: 2R (1962)

Gérard Pilet (15 September 1933 – 8 May 2011) was a French tennis player. He played Davis Cup for France and had a long career lasting from 1950 to 1970. He made his debut at Roland Garros in 1951 and lost in round two to Gil de Kermadec. He lost early in 1952 and 1953. In 1953, Pilet made his debut at Wimbledon and lost in round one to Felicisimo Ampon. Pilet lost early at Roland Garros in 1955, 1957, 1958 and 1959. In 1960 he lost in the last 16 to Nicola Pietrangeli. In 1961 Pietrangeli beat him in the quarter-finals. At Wimbledon 1961 Pilet lost in round one. Pilet lost in round three of Roland Garros in 1962, round two of Wimbledon and round two of U. S. championships. He lost early at Roland Garros in 1964, 1965 and 1966. As the open era arrived, Pilet's career was drawing to a close. He lost in round two of 1968 French Open to Thomas Koch.
