= Martin Mulligan =

Australian tennis player

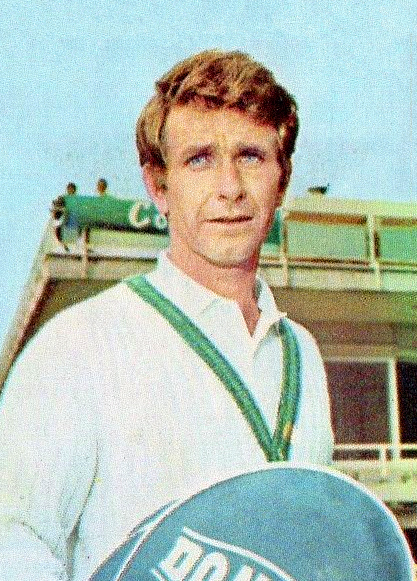
- Full name: Martin Frederick Mulligan
- Country (sports): Australia; Italy (1968-1975)
- Residence: San Francisco, United States
- Born: 18 October 1940 (age 86) Marrickville, New South Wales, Australia
- Turned pro: 1968 (amateur from 1956)
- Retired: 1975
- Plays: Right-handed (one-handed backhand)

Singles
- Career record: 737-317 (69.92%)
- Career titles: 74
- Highest ranking: No. 4 (1967, Lance Tingay)

Grand Slam singles results
- Australian Open: SF (1964)
- French Open: QF (1959, 1962, 1970)
- Wimbledon: F (1962)
- US Open: 2R (1966)

Grand Slam doubles results
- Australian Open: F (1961)

Grand Slam mixed doubles results
- Australian Open: F (1960)

Martin "Marty" Mulligan (born 18 October 1940) is a former tennis player from Australia. He is best known for reaching the men's singles final at Wimbledon in 1962, where he was defeated by fellow Australian Rod Laver.

== Personal life ==
Mulligan was born in the Sydney suburb of Marrickville. His maternal grandparents were Italian, from Orsago, Treviso, Veneto. They moved to Australia in 1900.

== Tennis career ==
=== Juniors ===
In 1958, he won the boys' singles title at the Australian Championships as well as the Boys' Doubles (with Bob Hewitt).

=== Career ===
He was runner-up in the men's doubles at the Australian Championships in 1961. In 1962, he was in the finals of the Dutch Open in Hilversum, and he won the men's singles title at the Italian Championships three times in 1963, 1965 and 1967. He won singles titles in 1967 and 1968 at the Swedish Open in Bastad and the Austrian Open at Kitzbuhel (1967). Mulligan won the 1970 Japan Championships. He was ranked in the world's top 10 in 1962, 1963, 1965 and 1967, reaching as high as world no. 4 in the latter year. Mulligan won 1960 U.S. Claycourts doubles (with Hewitt) and the 1962 German doubles (with Hewitt). Mulligan was a member of the 1968 Italian Davis Cup team, playing a total of 11 matches. Mulligan was ranked no. 1 in Italy between 1968 and 1971. He was the coach of Italian Davis Cup team for 10 years and was the first non-Italian to receive the Golden Racquet Award by the Italian Tennis Federation.

== Grand Slam finals ==
=== Singles (1 runner–up) ===
Result	Year	Championship	Surface	Opponent	Score
Loss	1962	Wimbledon	Grass	(Australia) Rod Laver	2–6, 2–6, 1–6

=== Doubles (1 runner-up) ===
Result	Year	Championship	Surface	Partner	Opponents	Score
Loss	1961	Australian Championships	Grass	(Australia) Roy Emerson	(Australia) Rod Laver (Australia) Bob Mark	3–6, 5–7, 6–3, 11–9, 2–6
