= Wilhelm Bungert =

German tennis player (born 1939)

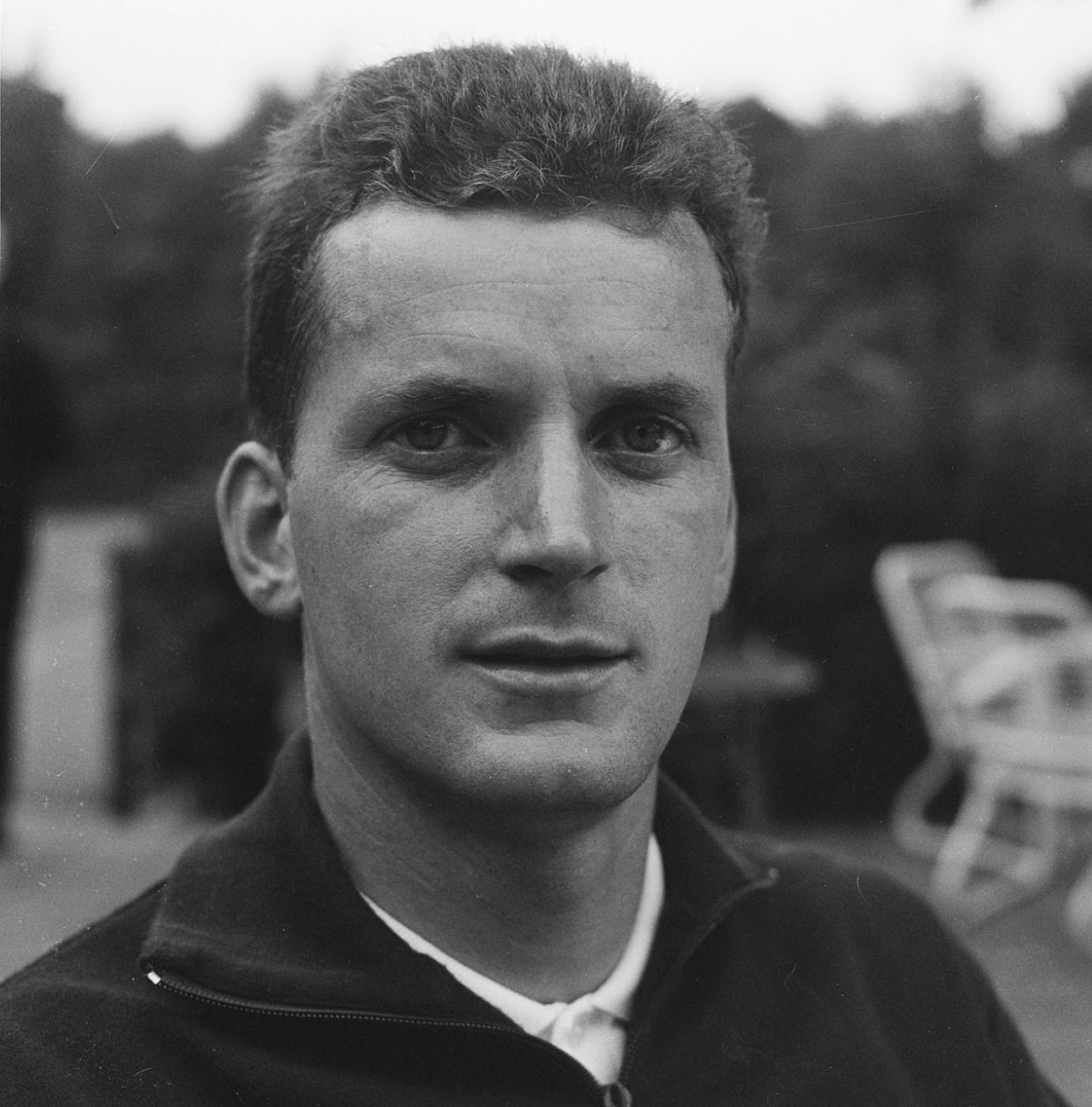
- Full name: Wilhelm Paul Bungert
- Country (sports): West Germany
- Residence: Düsseldorf, Germany
- Born: 1 April 1939 (age 86) Mannheim, Germany
- Height: 1.88 m (6 ft 2 in)
- Turned pro: 1957 (amateur tour)
- Retired: 1972
- Plays: Right-handed (one-handed backhand)

Singles
- Career record: 54–32
- Highest ranking: No. 4 (1964, Lance Tingay)

Grand Slam singles results
- Australian Open: QF (1962)
- French Open: 4R (1962)
- Wimbledon: F (1967)
- US Open: 4R (1966)

Doubles
- Career record: 8–9

Grand Slam doubles results
- Australian Open: 2R (1962)
- French Open: F (1962)
- Wimbledon: QF (1964)

Grand Slam mixed doubles results
- Australian Open: SF (1962)
- Wimbledon: QF (1963)

Team competitions
- Davis Cup: F (1970^{Ch})

Wilhelm Paul Bungert (born 1 April 1939) is a former German tennis player best known for reaching the 1967 Wimbledon final. He participated in the 1970 Davis Cup final as a player and in the 1985 Davis Cup final as team captain.

== Tennis career ==
In 1962 the right-handed Bungert reached the quarterfinals of the International Australian Championships, the doubles finals of the International French Championships and the International Tennis Tournament of Monte Carlo.

Bungert was ranked as high as World No. 4 for 1964 by Lance Tingay of The Daily Telegraph.

After reaching the semifinals in 1963 (beating Roy Emerson before losing to Chuck McKinley) and 1964 (losing to Emerson), the unseeded Bungert was the second German player (thirty years after Gottfried von Cramm) to reach the Wimbledon men’s finals in 1967 when he beat Roger Taylor in five sets. Bungert's victories in the quarterfinal and round of 16 had also been five-set affairs. However, he lost the final in straight sets against the Australian John Newcombe.

In 1970 he (with Christian Kuhnke) was part of the German Davis Cup team which lost the finals against the U.S. 0–5. In July of the same year he won his only career singles title in Düsseldorf.

In the eighties Bungert was captain of the German Davis Cup team (Boris Becker and Michael Westphal) which lost the finals against Sweden 2–3. Nikola Pilić became his successor as captain.

Today, Bungert owns a tennis and golf center in Hilden. Adidas named one of their tennis shoes after him and have been producing pairs up until (at least) October 2005. PUMA also named a tennis shoe after him, though exact production dates are unknown.

== Grand Slam finals ==
=== Singles (1 runner-up) ===
| Result | Year | Championship | Surface | Opponent | Score |
|---|---|---|---|---|---|
| Loss | 1967 | Wimbledon | Grass | (Australia) John Newcombe | 2–6, 1–6, 1–6 |

=== Doubles (1 runner–up) ===
| Result | Year | Championship | Surface | Partner | Opponents | Score |
|---|---|---|---|---|---|---|
| Loss | 1962 | French Championships | Clay | (West Germany) Christian Kuhnke | (Australia) Roy Emerson (Australia) Neale Fraser | 3–6, 4–6, 5–7 |

== Career finals ==
- Singles titles (1): 1970 Düsseldorf
- Doubles titles (1): 1968 Kitzbuehel (w/Jurgen Fassbender)
- Singles finalist (3) 1967 Wimbledon, 1968 Kitzbuehel, 1968 Düsseldorf
