= Billy Knight (tennis) =

British tennis player (1935–2026)

- Full name: William Arthur Knight
- Country (sports): United Kingdom
- Born: 12 November 1935 Northampton, England
- Died: 16 April 2026 (aged 90)
- Turned pro: 1951 (amateur)
- Retired: 1971
- Plays: Left-handed (one-handed backhand)

Singles
- Career record: 509–225
- Career titles: 47

Grand Slam singles results
- Australian Open: 2R (1954, 1957)
- French Open: QF (1959)
- Wimbledon: 4R (1957, 1959, 1961, 1964)
- US Open: 4R (1958, 1962)

Doubles
- Career record: 1–1

Grand Slam doubles results
- Australian Open: SF (1957)

Grand Slam mixed doubles results
- Australian Open: F (1957)
- French Open: W (1959)

Team competitions
- Davis Cup: SF (1963)

William Arthur Knight (12 November 1935 – 16 April 2026) was a British tennis player who competed on the amateur tour in the 1950s and 1960s. He was active from 1951 to 1968 and won 47 career singles titles. a quarter finalist at the French Championships in 1959 and a clay court specialist where most of his titles came, but also won titles on grass and wood indoor courts. His biggest wins were winning the British Hard Court Championships (1958, 1963–1964), British Covered Court Championships (1960), and German International Championships (1959).

== Early years ==
Knight was born on 12 November 1935 in Northampton, England, where his parents owned a furniture store. At Northampton Grammar School he was intellectually curious, pursuing interests in the history of Hinduism, Greek philosophy and Javanese art.

== Tennis career ==
=== Juniors ===
Before focusing on tennis Knight also played table tennis and won the English singles title in 1951. As a tennis junior he won both the 1953 Wimbledon and 1954 Australian Championships Boys' Singles tournaments.

=== Amateur tour ===
Knight played and won his first tournament at the Bude Open in 1951. Knight's best slam performance was reaching the quarter-finals of the 1959 French Championships. He won the mixed doubles at the same tournament, partnering Yola Ramírez.

His biggest international singles highlights include winning the Cannes Gallia Club Championship in 1958, the German International Championships in Hamburg in 1959, the French Riviera Championships in Menton in 1959, the Austrian International Championships in Pörtschach in 1960, the International Championships of Barcelona in 1960, the Yugoslavian International Championships in 1964. He won his final singles title at the Klum Carlton International in St. Moritz, Switzerland in 1968. He played his final singles tournament in 1971 at the Cumberland Hard Court Championships.

His best wins at British tournaments include winning the Scottish Championships in 1953, the Welsh Covered Court Championships in 1953, the London Hard Court Championships in 1955, British Hard Court Championships in 1958 and from 1963 to 1964, the British Covered Court Championships in 1960, the Midland Counties Championships in 1965, the North of England Hard Court Championships from 1966 to 1967.

Knight was a frequent member of the British Davis Cup team between 1955 and 1964, reaching the Inter-Zonal group in 1963.

== Later years and death ==
After retiring from playing, Knight continued running the family furniture store while doing some coaching. He died on 16 April 2026, at the age of 90.

== Grand Slam finals ==
=== Mixed doubles: 2 (1 title, 1 runner-up) ===
Result	Year	Championship	Surface	Partner	Opponents	Score
Loss	1957	Australian Championships	Grass	(Australia) Jill Langley	(Australia) Fay Muller (Australia) Mal Anderson	5–7, 6–3, 1–6
Win	1959	French Championships	Clay	(Mexico) Yola Ramírez	(Australia) Rod Laver (South Africa) Renée Schuurman	6–4, 6–4

== Junior Grand Slam titles ==
=== Singles: 2 ===
Result	Year	Tournament	Surface	Opponent	Score
Win	1953	Wimbledon	Grass	(India) Ramanathan Krishnan	7–5, 6–4
Win	1954	Australian Open	Grass	(Australia) Roy Emerson	6–3, 6–1
