= Mike Sangster =

British tennis player

- Full name: Mike John Sangster
- Country (sports): United Kingdom
- Born: 11 September 1940 Kingskerswell, Devon, England
- Died: 30 April 1985 (aged 44) Torquay, Devon, England
- Turned pro: 1956 (amateur tour)
- Retired: 1969
- Plays: Right-handed (one-handed backhand)

Singles
- Highest ranking: No. 7 (1961, Ned Potter)

Grand Slam singles results
- Australian Open: QF (1961, 1964)
- French Open: SF (1963)
- Wimbledon: SF (1961)
- US Open: SF (1961)

Doubles

Grand Slam doubles results
- Australian Open: QF (1964)
- Wimbledon: QF (1961, 1963)
- US Open: F (1964)

Mixed doubles

Grand Slam mixed doubles results
- Australian Open: F (1964)
- Wimbledon: QF (1962)

Team competitions
- Davis Cup: SF (1963)

Mike Sangster (11 September 1940 – 30 April 1985) was a British No. 1 tennis player of the 1960s. He reached at least the quarter-final stage of each of the four Grand Slams, getting to the semi-finals of the 1963 French Open, 1961 Wimbledon and the 1961 US Open. Sangster was ranked world amateur No. 7 in 1961 by Ned Potter.

== Early life ==
Mike Sangster was born in Kingskerswell, Devon on 11 September 1940. On 30 May 1943, he escaped being killed by German bombs when his sister decided not to take him to Sunday School. Twenty-one children and their three Sunday School teachers died when the church was bombed. He attended Torquay Boys' Grammar School. As a teenager he played football for Torquay United and was offered a contract by West Ham United, before turning to tennis.

== Tennis career ==
Mike Sangster made his first Wimbledon appearance aged 17 in 1958 and quickly rose to become British No. 1. He was immensely popular with the British public throughout the 1960s. He was renowned for his massive serve and for being a snappy dresser on court.

In 1961, Sangster became the first Briton in almost a quarter of a century to reach the Wimbledon Men's Singles Semi-finals (the previous being Bunny Austin in 1938). Sangster was beaten by the eighth seeded American, Chuck McKinley, in straight sets. The only other Britons to have reached the Wimbledon semis since have been Roger Taylor, Tim Henman and Andy Murray. He also lost in the semifinals of the 1961 U.S. Championships to Rod Laver. In 1963, aged 22, Sangster reached the semi-finals of the French Tennis Championships where he lost to eventual champion Roy Emerson in straight sets.

In 1964, Sangster's Australian coach, George Worthington, died. The death of his coach and mentor seemed to undermine Sangster's resolve.

While Sangster never reached a Grand Slam final, he is one of only three British men since Fred Perry (the others being Tim Henman and Andy Murray) to have reached the semi-finals of three different Grand Slam events – Wimbledon in 1961, the US National Tennis Championships in 1961 and the French Championships in 1963.

=== Serve ===
Sangster was renowned for his fast serve. His fastest serve was recorded at 154 miles per hour in 1963. This compares with the current world record of 155 mph set by Andy Roddick in a Davis Cup match against Russia in 2004. Although it was considered by many to be a world record at the time, Sangster's record remains unofficial since it was not timed with precise modern technology (Similarly, Bill Tilden had a serve timed unofficially at 163.6 mph in 1931). To return his serve, players had to retreat to the back of the court. In one match at the US Open, Rod Laver retreated so far back that he became entangled with the backstop netting.

=== Davis Cup ===
Sangster holds the record for the most matches played for Great Britain in the Davis Cup. He played 65 matches from 1960 to 1968, winning 43 of them.

== Later life and death ==
In later years, Sangster ran a chain of sporting goods stores in southwestern England. In 1972 he married Pauline Goodrich and they had two children. Mike Sangster collapsed and died of a heart attack on 30 April 1985 while playing golf at the Petitor Golf Course in St Marychurch. He was 44 years old.

== Grand Slam finals ==
=== Doubles (1 runner-up) ===
Result	Year	Championship	Surface	Partner	Opponents	Score
Loss	1964	U.S. Championships	Grass	(United Kingdom) Graham Stilwell	(United States) Chuck McKinley (United States) Dennis Ralston	3–6, 2–6, 4–6

=== Mixed doubles (1 runner-up) ===
Result	Year	Championship	Surface	Partner	Opponents	Score
Loss	1964	Australian Championships	Grass	(Australia) Jan Lehane	(Australia) Margaret Smith (Australia) Ken Fletcher	2–6, 3–6
