= 1997 Welsh International Open =

Tennis tournament

- Date: May 13 – May 18
- Edition: 2nd
- Category: Tier IV
- Surface: Clay / Outdoor
- Location: Cardiff, Wales

Champions

Singles
- (Spain) Virginia Ruano-Pascual

Doubles
- (United States) Debbie Graham / (Australia) Kerry-Anne Guse
← 1996 ·	Welsh International Open	· 1998 →

The 1997 Welsh International Open was a women's tennis tournament played on outdoor clay courts in Cardiff in Wales that was part of Tier IV of the 1997 WTA Tour. The tournament was held from May 13 through May 18, 1997.

== Winners ==
=== Women's singles ===
(Spain) Virginia Ruano-Pascual defeated (France) Alexia Dechaume-Balleret 6–1, 3–6, 6–2

- It was Ruano-Pascual's only title of the year and the 1st of her career.

=== Women's doubles ===
(United States) Debbie Graham / (Australia) Kerry-Anne Guse defeated (United Kingdom) Julie Pullin / (United Kingdom) Lorna Woodroffe 6–3, 6–4

- It was Graham's only title of the year and the 5th of her career. It was Guse's 2nd title of the year and the 5th of her career.
