= 1975 WCT International =

- Date: 6–12 February
- Edition: 3rd
- Category: WCT circuit
- Draw: 32S / 16D
- Prize money: $60,000
- Surface: Carpet / indoor
- Location: Bologna, Italy

Champions

Singles
- (Sweden) Björn Borg

Doubles
- (Italy) Paolo Bertolucci / (Italy) Adriano Panatta
← 1974 ·	Bologna Indoor	· 1978 →

The 1975 WCT International, also known as the Bologna Open or Bologna WCT, was a men's tennis tournament played on indoor carpet courts that was part of the Green Group of the 1975 World Championship Tennis circuit and took place in Bologna, Italy. It was the third edition of the tournament and was held from 6 February through 12 February 1975. Second-seeded Björn Borg won the singles title and earned $12,000 first prize money.

== Finals ==
=== Singles ===
(Sweden) Björn Borg defeated (United States) Arthur Ashe 7–6^{(7–4)}, 4–6, 7–6^{(7–4)}

- It was Borg's 2nd singles title of the year and the 10th of his career.

=== Doubles ===
(Italy) Paolo Bertolucci / (Italy) Adriano Panatta defeated (United States) Arthur Ashe / (Netherlands) Tom Okker 6–3, 3–6, 6–3
