= 1997 Welsh International Open – Singles =

Singles
- 1997 Welsh International Open
- 1996 Champion: (Belgium) Dominique Van Roost

Final
- Champion: (Spain) Virginia Ruano-Pascual
- Runner-up: (France) Alexia Dechaume-Balleret
- Score: 6–1, 3–6, 6–2

Events
Singles	Doubles
← 1996 ·	Welsh International Open	· 1998 →

Dominique Van Roost was the defending champion but lost in the quarterfinals to Rita Grande.

Virginia Ruano-Pascual won in the final 6–1, 3–6, 6–2 against Alexia Dechaume-Balleret.

== Seeds ==
A champion seed is indicated in bold text while text in italics indicates the round in which that seed was eliminated.

1. (Belgium) Dominique Van Roost (quarterfinals)
2. (Sweden) Åsa Carlsson (quarterfinals)
3. (Netherlands) Miriam Oremans (second round)
4. (Czech Republic) Petra Langrová (quarterfinals)
5. (France) Sarah Pitkowski (semifinals)
6. (Australia) Annabel Ellwood (first round)
7. (Czech Republic) Denisa Chládková (first round)
8. (Japan) Yuka Yoshida (first round)

== Draw ==
=== Key ===
- Q = Qualifier
- WC = Wild card
- LL = Lucky loser
- Alt = Alternate
- SE = Special exempt
- PR = Protected ranking
- ITF = ITF entry
- JE = Junior exempt
- w/o = Walkover
- r = Retired
- d = Defaulted
- SR = Special ranking

First round
1	(Belgium) **D Van Roost**	**6**	**6**
(United States) M Tu	3	3
Q	(Germany) V Martinek	1	6
(Slovakia) **R Zrubáková**	**6**	**7**
(Italy) **R Grande**	**7**	**6**
(Australia) K-A Guse	5	2
(Spain) **C Torrens Valero**	3	**6**	**6**
7	(Czech Republic) D Chládková	**6**	4	1
4	(Czech Republic) **P Langrová**	**6**	**6**
Q	(Mexico) A Gavaldón	3	3
(Austria) **S Dopfer**	**6**	**6**
WC	(United Kingdom) S Smith	2	2
(Italy) S Cecchini	4	2
(United States) **A Grossman**	**6**	**6**
(Spain) **V Ruano-Pascual**	3	**7**	**7**
6	(Australia) A Ellwood	**6**	6	6
8	(Japan) Y Yoshida	**7**	3	2
(Romania) **C Cristea**	5	**6**	**6**
(Czech Republic) L Richterová	5	0
(France) **A D-Balleret**	**7**	**6**
(Italy) **F Lubiani**	1	**6**	**7**
Q	(Switzerland) E Gagliardi	**6**	2	6
(Austria) M Maruska	4	**6**	3
3	(Netherlands) **M Oremans**	**6**	2	**6**
5	(France) **S Pitkowski**	**6**	**6**
(Spain) G León García	3	2
(United States) **T Whitlinger-Jones**	**6**	**6**
Q	(Spain) L Pena	0	0
(Germany) **P Begerow**	**6**	**6**
(United States) J Watanabe	3	2
WC	(United Kingdom) J Pullin	4	1
2	(Sweden) **Å Carlsson**	**6**	**6**

Second round
1	(Belgium) **D Van Roost**	**7**	**7**
(Slovakia) R Zrubáková	5	5
(Italy) **R Grande**	**6**	**6**
(Spain) C Torrens Valero	3	2
4	(Czech Republic) **P Langrová**	**6**	**6**
(Austria) S Dopfer	3	4
(United States) A Grossman	0	0
(Spain) **V Ruano-Pascual**	**6**	**6**
(Romania) C Cristea	4	4
(France) **A D-Balleret**	**6**	**6**
(Italy) **F Lubiani**	**7**	**6**
3	(Netherlands) M Oremans	5	2
5	(France) **S Pitkowski**	3	**6**	**7**
(United States) T Whitlinger-Jones	**6**	0	5
(Germany) P Begerow	3	4
2	(Sweden) **Å Carlsson**	**6**	**6**

Quarterfinals
1	(Belgium) D Van Roost	**6**	2	5
(Italy) **R Grande**	1	**6**	**7**
4	(Czech Republic) P Langrová	4	2
(Spain) **V Ruano-Pascual**	**6**	**6**
(France) **A D-Balleret**	2	**6**	**6**
(Italy) F Lubiani	**6**	4	2
5	(France) **S Pitkowski**	**7**	**6**
2	(Sweden) Å Carlsson	5	4

Semifinals
(Italy) R Grande	3	**6**	4
(Spain) **V Ruano-Pascual**	**6**	3	**6**
(France) **A D-Balleret**	**6**	**6**
5	(France) S Pitkowski	3	4

Final
(Spain) **V Ruano-Pascual**	**6**	3	**6**
(France) A D-Balleret	1	**6**	2
