= 1974 Astor Cup – Doubles =

Tennis tournament event

Doubles
- 1974 Astor Cup

Final
- Champion: (Sweden) Ove Nils Bengtson (Sweden) Björn Borg
- Runner-up: (United States) Arthur Ashe (United States) Roscoe Tanner
- Score: 6–4, 5–7, 4–6, 7–6, 6–2

Details
- Draw: 16
- Seeds: 4

Events
Singles	Doubles
← 1971 ·	Bologna Indoor	· 1975 →

The 1973 Astor Cup – Doubles was an event of the 1974 Astor Cup men's tennis tournament that was played in Bologna in Italy from 11 February until 17 February 1974. Ken Rosewall and Fred Stolle were the defending doubles champions, but did not compete in this edition. Unseeded Ove Nils Bengtson and Björn Borg won the doubles title, defeating fourth-seeded Arthur Ashe and Roscoe Tanner in the final, 6–4, 5–7, 4–6, 7–6, 6–2.

== Seeds ==
1. (Argentina) Guillermo Vilas / (Argentina) Tito Vázquez (first round, withdrew)
2. (Czechoslovakia) Jan Kodeš / (Czechoslovakia) Vladimír Zedník (quarterfinals)
3. (United States) Eddie Dibbs / (United States) Harold Solomon (quarterfinals)
4. (United States) Arthur Ashe / (United States) Roscoe Tanner (final)

== Draw ==
=== Key ===
- Q = Qualifier
- WC = Wild card
- LL = Lucky loser
- Alt = Alternate
- ITF = ITF entry
- PR = Protected ranking
- SR = Special ranking
- SE = Special exempt
- JE = Junior exempt
- JR = Junior Accelerator Programme entrant
- CO = College Accelerator Programme entrant
- NG = Next Gen Accelerator Program entrant
- w/o = Walkover
- r = Retired
- d = Defaulted

First Round
2	(Czechoslovakia) Jan Kodeš (Czech Republic) Vladimír Zedník	7	6
(South Africa) Raymond Moore (New Zealand) Onny Parun	6	4
(United States) Paul Gerken (Pakistan) Haroon Rahim	3	6	6
(Italy) Adriano Panatta (Romania) Ion Țiriac	6	4	4
(Spain) Juan Gisbert Sr. (United Kingdom) Roger Taylor	7	7
(United Kingdom) Mark Cox (Japan) Jun Kamiwazumi	5	5
(Italy) Corrado Barazzutti (Italy) Ezio Di Matteo	4	4
4	(United States) Arthur Ashe (United States) Roscoe Tanner	6	6
(United Kingdom) Gerald Battrick (United Kingdom) Graham Stilwell	6	4
(Spain) Antonio Muñoz (Italy) Tonino Zugarelli	3	1^{r}
(Sweden) Björn Borg (Sweden) Ove Bengtson	6	7
(Italy) Vincenzo Franchitti (Italy) Pietro Marzano	4	5
(United States) Tom Edlefsen (United States) Tom Leonard	6	7
(Australia) Colin Dibley (Australia) Rod Laver	4	6
1	(Argentina) Guillermo Vilas (Argentina) Tito Vázquez
3	(United States) Eddie Dibbs (United States) Harold Solomon	w/o

Quarterfinals
2	(Czechoslovakia) Jan Kodeš (Czechoslovakia) Vladimír Zedník	7	5	2
(United States) Paul Gerken (Pakistan) Haroon Rahim	6	7	6
(Spain) Juan Gisbert Sr. (United Kingdom) Roger Taylor	6	5
4	(United States) Arthur Ashe (United States) Roscoe Tanner	7	7
(United Kingdom) Gerald Battrick (United Kingdom) Graham Stilwell	1	3
(Sweden) Björn Borg (Sweden) Ove Bengtson	6	6
(United States) Tom Edlefsen (United States) Tom Leonard	6	6
3	(United States) Eddie Dibbs (United States) Harold Solomon	0	4

Semifinals
(United States) Paul Gerken (Pakistan) Haroon Rahim	3	4
4	(United States) Arthur Ashe (United States) Roscoe Tanner	6	6
(Sweden) Björn Borg (Sweden) Ove Bengtson	6	1	6
(United States) Tom Edlefsen (United States) Tom Leonard	2	6	3

Final
4	(United States) Arthur Ashe (United States) Roscoe Tanner	4	7	6	6	2
(Sweden) Björn Borg (Sweden) Ove Bengtson	6	5	4	7	6
