= 1995 Rover British Clay Court Championships – Singles =

Singles
- 1995 Rover British Clay Court Championships

Final
- Champion: (Czech Republic) Ludmila Richterová
- Runner-up: (Canada) Patricia Hy-Boulais
- Score: 6–7, 6–4, 6–3

Details
- Draw: 32
- Seeds: 8

Events
Singles	Doubles
← 1994 ·	British Hard Court Championships	· 1996 →

Ludmila Richterová won in the final 6–7, 6–4, 6–3 against Patricia Hy-Boulais.

== Seeds ==
A champion seed is indicated in bold text while text in italics indicates the round in which that seed was eliminated.

1. (Japan) Mana Endo (first round)
2. (United States) Chanda Rubin (quarterfinals)
3. n/a
4. (Romania) Ruxandra Dragomir (second round)
5. (Poland) Katarzyna Nowak (first round)
6. (United States) Patty Fendick (second round)
7. (Sweden) Åsa Carlsson (semifinals)
8. n/a

== Draw ==
=== Key ===
- Q = Qualifier
- WC = Wild card
- LL = Lucky loser
- Alt = Alternate
- SE = Special exempt
- PR = Protected ranking
- ITF = ITF entry
- JE = Junior exempt
- w/o = Walkover
- r = Retired
- d = Defaulted
- SR = Special ranking

First round
1	(Japan) M Endo	5	2
(United States) **D Graham**	**7**	**6**
(Hong Kong) M Tang	2	2
(Canada) **P Hy-Boulais**	**6**	**6**
(Czech Republic) **P Langrová**	**6**	**7**
(Argentina) P Tarabini	2	5
(Sweden) **M Strandlund**	**6**	**6**
5	(Poland) K Nowak	2	2
4	(Romania) **R Dragomir**	**7**	**6**
(Austria) B Reinstadler	6	0
(Austria) B Schett	6	0
(Czech Republic) **R Bobková**	**7**	**6**
WC	(United Kingdom) **M Miller**	**7**	**6**
(Germany) S Frankl	5	2
Q	(United States) **L Lee**	4	**6**	**6**
LL	(Australia) A Ellwood	**6**	2	2
7	(Sweden) **Å Carlsson**	**6**	**6**
Q	(Australia) K-A Guse	2	2
(Poland) M Grzybowska	6	4
(Japan) **A Sugiyama**	**7**	**6**
LL	(United Kingdom) **K Cross**	**6**	**6**
LL	(Argentina) M-J Gaidano	4	4
Q	(Belgium) **E Callens**	**6**	**6**
LL	(United Kingdom) L Jelfs	1	4
6	(United States) **P Fendick**	**6**	**7**
(Austria) S Dopfer	0	6
Q	(Australia) K Sharpe	3	4
(Czech Republic) **L Richterová**	**6**	**6**
(France) A Fusai	**6**	4	6
WC	(United Kingdom) **C Wood**	2	**6**	**7**
(Slovenia) T Križan	3	2
2	(United States) **C Rubin**	**6**	**6**

Second round
(United States) D Graham	**7**	3	1
(Canada) **P Hy-Boulais**	5	**6**	**6**
(Czech Republic) **P Langrová**	**6**	4	**6**
(Sweden) M Strandlund	3	**6**	3
4	(Romania) R Dragomir	**6**	3	4
(Czech Republic) **R Bobková**	1	**6**	**6**
WC	(United Kingdom) M Miller	1	2
Q	(United States) **L Lee**	**6**	**6**
7	(Sweden) **Å Carlsson**	**6**	3	**6**
(Japan) A Sugiyama	4	**6**	4
LL	(United Kingdom) K Cross	1	2
Q	(Belgium) **E Callens**	**6**	**6**
6	(United States) P Fendick	3	4
(Czech Republic) **L Richterová**	**6**	**6**
WC	(United Kingdom) C Wood	2	1
2	(United States) **C Rubin**	**6**	**6**

Quarterfinals
(Canada) **P Hy-Boulais**	**6**	**6**
(Czech Republic) P Langrová	4	2
(Czech Republic) R Bobková	3	5
Q	(United States) **L Lee**	**6**	**7**
7	(Sweden) **Å Carlsson**	**6**	**7**
Q	(Belgium) E Callens	1	5
(Czech Republic) **L Richterová**	3	**6**	**7**
2	(United States) C Rubin	**6**	3	5

Semifinals
(Canada) **P Hy-Boulais**	**7**	**6**
Q	(United States) L Lee	5	2
7	(Sweden) Å Carlsson	2	4
(Czech Republic) **L Richterová**	**6**	**6**

Final
(Canada) Patricia Hy-Boulais	**7**	4	3
(Czech Republic) **Ludmila Richterová**	6	**6**	**6**
