= 1975 British Hard Court Championships =

- Date: 12–18 May
- Edition: 46th
- Category: Grand Prix (B class)
- Draw: 64S/32D
- Surface: Clay / outdoor
- Location: Bournemouth, England
- Venue: The West Hants Club

Champions

Men's singles
- (Spain) Manuel Orantes

Women's singles
- (United States) Janet Newberry

Men's doubles
- (Spain) Juan Gisbert / (Spain) Manuel Orantes

Women's doubles
- (United Kingdom) Lesley Charles / (United Kingdom) Sue Mappin
← 1974 ·	British Hard Court Championships	· 1976 →

The 1975 British Hard Court Championships, also known by its sponsored name Coca-Cola British Hard Court Championships, was a combined men's and women's tennis tournament played on outdoor clay courts at The West Hants Club in Bournemouth, England. The men's event was part of the Grand Prix circuit and categorized as B class. The women's event was part of the ILTF Independent Tour. It was the 46th edition of the tournament and was held from 12 May through 18 May 1975. Manuel Orantes and Janet Newberry won the singles titles.

== Finals ==
=== Men's singles ===
(Spain) Manuel Orantes defeated (France) Patrick Proisy 6–3, 4–6, 6–2, 7–5

=== Women's singles ===
(United States) Janet Newberry defeated (United States) Terry Holladay 7–9, 7–5, 6–3

=== Men's doubles ===
(Spain) Juan Gisbert / (Spain) Manuel Orantes defeated (Australia) Syd Ball / (Australia) Dick Crealy 8–6, 6–3

=== Women's doubles ===
(United Kingdom) Lesley Charles / (United Kingdom) Sue Mappin defeated (South Africa) Linky Boshoff / (South Africa) Greer Stevens 6–3, 6–3
