= 1997 Welsh International Open – Doubles =

Doubles
- 1997 Welsh International Open
- 1996 Champions: (United States) Katrina Adams (South Africa) Mariaan de Swardt

Final
- Champions: (United States) Debbie Graham (Australia) Kerry-Anne Guse
- Runners-up: (United Kingdom) Julie Pullin (United Kingdom) Lorna Woodroffe
- Score: 6–3, 6–4

Events
Singles	Doubles
← 1996 ·	Welsh International Open	· 1998 →

Katrina Adams and Mariaan de Swardt were the defending champions but did not compete that year.

Debbie Graham and Kerry-Anne Guse won in the final 6–3, 6–4 against Julie Pullin and Lorna Woodroffe.

== Seeds ==
Champion seeds are indicated in bold text while text in italics indicates the round in which those seeds were eliminated.

1. (United States) **Debbie Graham** / (Australia) **Kerry-Anne Guse (champions)**
2. (United States) Ann Grossman / (United States) Tami Whitlinger-Jones (quarterfinals)
3. (Japan) Miho Saeki / (Japan) Yuka Yoshida (quarterfinals)
4. (Canada) Sonya Jeyaseelan / (Chinese Taipei) Janet Lee (quarterfinals)

== Draw ==
=== Key ===
- Q = Qualifier
- WC = Wild card
- LL = Lucky loser
- Alt = Alternate
- SE = Special exempt
- PR = Protected ranking
- ITF = ITF entry
- JE = Junior exempt
- w/o = Walkover
- r = Retired
- d = Defaulted
- SR = Special ranking

First round
1	(United States) **D Graham** (Australia) **K-A Guse**	**6**	**6**
Q	(Belarus) O Barabanschikova (Czech Republic) L Richterová	2	0
(Italy) **S Cecchini** (Spain) **V Ruano-Pascual**	**6**	**6**
(Germany) V Martinek (France) S Pitkowski	1	2
4	(Canada) **S Jeyaseelan** (Chinese Taipei) **J Lee**	**6**	**6**
(United States) R Jensen (United States) L Lee	3	0
(Australia) **A Ellwood** (Croatia) **M Murić**	**6**	**6**
(United States) E deLone (Australia) N Pratt	3	4
(Czech Republic) **P Langrová** (Slovakia) **R Zrubáková**	4	**7**	**7**
(United Kingdom) S-A Siddall (United Kingdom) A Wainwright	**6**	5	5
(Romania) C Cristea (Australia) D Jones	0	2
3	(Japan) **M Saeki** (Japan) **Y Yoshida**	**6**	**6**
(United Kingdom) **J Pullin** (United Kingdom) **L Woodroffe**	3	**6**	**7**
(Australia) C Barclay (United Kingdom) C Wood	**6**	4	6
(United Kingdom) S Smith (United States) M Tu	4	1
2	(United States) **A Grossman** (United States) **T Whitlinger-Jones**	**6**	**6**

Quarterfinals
1	(United States) **D Graham** (Australia) **K-A Guse**	**6**	**6**
(Italy) S Cecchini (Spain) V Ruano-Pascual	2	2
4	(Canada) S Jeyaseelan (Chinese Taipei) J Lee	5	4
(Australia) **A Ellwood** (Croatia) **M Murić**	**7**	**6**
(Czech Republic) **P Langrová** (Slovakia) **R Zrubáková**	3	**5**
3	(Japan) M Saeki (Japan) Y Yoshida	**6**	1	r
(United Kingdom) **J Pullin** (United Kingdom) **L Woodroffe**	**6**	**6**
2	(United States) A Grossman (United States) T Whitlinger-Jones	2	3

Semifinals
1	(United States) **D Graham** (Australia) **K-A Guse**	**6**	**7**
(Australia) A Ellwood (Croatia) M Murić	3	6
(Czech Republic) P Langrová (Slovakia) R Zrubáková	5	2
(United Kingdom) **J Pullin** (United Kingdom) **L Woodroffe**	**7**	**6**

Final
1	(United States) **Debbie Graham** (Australia) **Kerry-Anne Guse**	**6**	**6**
(United Kingdom) Julie Pullin (United Kingdom) Lorna Woodroffe	3	4
