= 1996 Rover British Clay Court Championships – Singles =

Singles
- 1996 Rover British Clay Court Championships
- 1995 Champion: (Czech Republic) Ludmila Richterová

Final
- Champion: (Belgium) Dominique Van Roost
- Runner-up: (Belgium) Laurence Courtois
- Score: 6–4, 6–2

Details
- Draw: 32
- Seeds: 8

Events
Singles	Doubles
- Rover British Clay Court Championships

Ludmila Richterová was the defending champion but did not compete that year.

Dominique Van Roost won in the final 6–4, 6–2 against Laurence Courtois.

== Seeds ==
A champion seed is indicated in bold text while text in italics indicates the round in which that seed was eliminated.

1. (Belgium) Sabine Appelmans (first round)
2. (South Africa) Mariaan de Swardt (quarterfinals)
3. (Netherlands) Miriam Oremans (quarterfinals)
4. (Belgium) Laurence Courtois (final)
5. (Belgium) **Dominique Van Roost (champion)**
6. (Japan) Naoko Kijimuta (quarterfinals)
7. (Canada) Patricia Hy-Boulais (semifinals)
8. (France) Alexandra Fusai (quarterfinals)

== Draw ==
Key

- Q = Qualifier
- WC = Wild card
- LL = Lucky loser
- Alt = Alternate
- ITF = ITF entry
- PR = Protected ranking
- SR = Special ranking
- SE = Special exempt
- JE = Junior exempt
- JR = Junior Accelerator Programme entrant
- CO = College Accelerator Programme entrant
- NG = Next Gen Accelerator Program entrant
- w/o = Walkover
- r = Retired
- d = Defaulted

First round
1	(Belgium) S Appelmans	4	5
(Slovakia) **H Nagyová**	**6**	**7**
Q	(Venezuela) **M Mazzotta**	**6**	**6**
(Argentina) M-J Gaidano	1	3
WC	(United Kingdom) C Taylor	1	2
(United States) **M Tu**	**6**	**6**
(Austria) P Schwarz	3	**6**	4
6	(Japan) **N Kijimuta**	**6**	3	**6**
4	(Belgium) **L Courtois**	3	**6**	**6**
(United States) K Adams	**6**	3	3
(Italy) A Serra Zanetti	0	3
Q	(Australia) **K Radford**	**6**	**6**
(Germany) V Martinek	1	4
LL	(Czech Republic) **L Varmužová**	**6**	**6**
LL	(Russia) J Lutrova	**7**	0	2
8	(France) **A Fusai**	6	**6**	**6**
5	(Belgium) **D Van Roost**	**6**	**6**
(Russia) N Egorova	1	3
LL	(France) L Ghirardi	0	4
(Argentina) **P Suárez**	**6**	**6**
LL	(Canada) **S Jeyaseelan**	**7**	**7**
Q	(Argentina) M Paz	5	5
(United States) A Miller	3	1
3	(Netherlands) **M Oremans**	**6**	**6**
7	(Canada) **P Hy-Boulais**	**6**	3	**6**
(United States) E deLone	3	**6**	2
(Austria) B Reinstadler	6	3
(Belgium) **E Callens**	**7**	**6**
Q	(Luxembourg) A Kremer	2	4
(France) **S Pitkowski**	**6**	**6**
WC	(United Kingdom) C Wood	2	2
2	(South Africa) **M de Swardt**	**6**	**6**

Second round
(Slovakia) **H Nagyová**	**6**	**6**
Q	(Venezuela) M Mazzotta	2	3
(United States) M Tu	1	2
6	(Japan) **N Kijimuta**	**6**	**6**
4	(Belgium) **L Courtois**	**6**	**6**
Q	(Australia) K Radford	2	4
LL	(Czech Republic) L Varmužová	3	**7**	3
8	(France) **A Fusai**	**6**	6	**6**
5	(Belgium) **D Van Roost**	**6**	**6**
(Argentina) P Suárez	0	1
LL	(Canada) S Jeyaseelan	0	2
3	(Netherlands) **M Oremans**	**6**	**6**
7	(Canada) **P Hy-Boulais**	**6**	**6**
(Belgium) E Callens	3	1
(France) S Pitkowski	3	2
2	(South Africa) **M de Swardt**	**6**	**6**

Quarterfinals
(Slovakia) **H Nagyová**	**7**	**7**
6	(Japan) N Kijimuta	6	5
4	(Belgium) **L Courtois**	**6**	**6**
8	(France) A Fusai	1	3
5	(Belgium) **D Van Roost**	**6**	**6**
3	(Netherlands) M Oremans	3	3
7	(Canada) **P Hy-Boulais**	**6**	**6**
2	(South Africa) M de Swardt	3	3

Semifinals
(Slovakia) H Nagyová	4	**6**	4
4	(Belgium) **L Courtois**	**6**	3	**6**
5	(Belgium) **D Van Roost**	**6**	**7**
7	(Canada) P Hy-Boulais	2	6

Final
4	(Belgium) Laurence Courtois	4	2
5	(Belgium) **D Van Roost**	**6**	**6**
