= 1974 Astor Cup – Singles =

Tennis tournament event

Singles
- 1974 Astor Cup

Final
- Champion: (United States) Arthur Ashe
- Runner-up: (United Kingdom) Mark Cox
- Score: 6–4, 7–5

Details
- Draw: 32
- Seeds: 8

Events
Singles	Doubles
← 1971 ·	Bologna Indoor	· 1975 →

The 1973 Astor Cup – Singles was an event of the 1974 Astor Cup men's tennis tournament that was played in Bologna in Italy from 11 February until 17 February 1974. First-seeded Rod Laver was the defending champion, but lost in the quarterfinals. Third-seeded Arthur Ashe won the singles title, defeating seventh-seeded Mark Cox in the final, 6–4, 7–5.

== Seeds ==
1. (Australia) Rod Laver (quarterfinals)
2. (Czech Republic) Jan Kodeš (second round)
3. (United States) Arthur Ashe (champion)
4. (Italy) Adriano Panatta (quarterfinals)
5. (United Kingdom) Roger Taylor (semifinals)
6. (Sweden) Björn Borg (first round)
7. (United Kingdom) Mark Cox (final)
8. (United States) Roscoe Tanner (first round)

== Draw ==
=== Key ===
- Q = Qualifier
- WC = Wild card
- LL = Lucky loser
- Alt = Alternate
- ITF = ITF entry
- PR = Protected ranking
- SR = Special ranking
- SE = Special exempt
- JE = Junior exempt
- JR = Junior Accelerator Programme entrant
- CO = College Accelerator Programme entrant
- NG = Next Gen Accelerator Program entrant
- w/o = Walkover
- r = Retired
- d = Defaulted

=== Finals ===
Semifinals
(Romania) Ion Țiriac	3	4
7	(United Kingdom) Mark Cox	6	6
3	(United States) Arthur Ashe	6	4	6
5	(United Kingdom) Roger Taylor	0	6	2

Final
7	(United Kingdom) Mark Cox	4	5
3	(United States) Arthur Ashe	6	7

=== Top half ===
First Round
2	(Czechoslovakia) Jan Kodeš	6	6
(United Kingdom) Gerald Battrick	2	3
(United States) Harold Solomon	1	3
(Australia) Colin Dibley	6	6
(Japan) Jun Kamiwazumi	2	3
(Sweden) Ove Bengtson	6	6
(Romania) Ion Țiriac	7^{7}	6
8	(United States) Roscoe Tanner	6^{5}	3
7	(United Kingdom) Mark Cox	6	6
(Italy) Ezio Di Matteo	4	3
(Pakistan) Haroon Rahim	2	6^{5}
(Spain) Juan Gisbert Sr.	6	7^{7}
(Italy) Corrado Barazzutti	5	6	6
(Italy) Pietro Marzano	7	4	3
(Czechoslovakia) Vladimír Zedník	6	3	6^{3}
4	(Italy) Adriano Panatta	3	6	7^{7}

Second Round
2	(Czechoslovakia) Jan Kodeš	6	3	4
(Australia) Colin Dibley	3	6	6
(Sweden) Ove Bengtson	3	1
(Romania) Ion Țiriac	6	6
7	(United Kingdom) Mark Cox	6	6
(Spain) Juan Gisbert Sr.	2	3
(Italy) Corrado Barazzutti	4	7^{7}	5
4	(Italy) Adriano Panatta	6	6^{5}	7

Quarterfinals
(Australia) Colin Dibley	4	6	5
(Romania) Ion Țiriac	6	3	7
7	(United Kingdom) Mark Cox	6	6
4	(Italy) Adriano Panatta	1	4

Semifinals
(Romania) Ion Țiriac	3	4
7	(United Kingdom) Mark Cox	6	6

=== Bottom half ===
First Round
3	(United States) Arthur Ashe	6	6
(United States) Tom Leonard	4	2
(Argentina) Guillermo Vilas
(New Zealand) Onny Parun	w/o
(United Kingdom) Graham Stilwell	4	7^{7}	6
(United States) Paul Gerken	6	6^{5}	4
(Italy) Vincenzo Franchitti	6	6
6	(Sweden) Björn Borg	3	4
5	(United Kingdom) Roger Taylor	6	6
(United States) Tom Edlefsen	2	3
(South Africa) Raymond Moore	6	6
(Spain) Antonio Muñoz	1	3
(Argentina) Tito Vázquez	3	0
(United States) Eddie Dibbs	6	6
(Italy) Tonino Zugarelli	2	6	5
1	(Australia) Rod Laver	6	4	7

Second Round
3	(United States) Arthur Ashe	6	6
(New Zealand) Onny Parun	4	4
(United Kingdom) Graham Stilwell	6^{4}	6	6
(Italy) Vincenzo Franchitti	7^{7}	1	2
5	(United Kingdom) Roger Taylor	7	3	6
(South Africa) Raymond Moore	5	6	2
(United States) Eddie Dibbs	4	6^{3}
1	(Australia) Rod Laver	6	7^{7}

Quarterfinals
3	(United States) Arthur Ashe	6	6
(United Kingdom) Graham Stilwell	4	4
5	(United Kingdom) Roger Taylor	7	6
1	(Australia) Rod Laver	5	1

Semifinals
3	(United States) Arthur Ashe	6	4	6
5	(United Kingdom) Roger Taylor	0	6	2
