= 1975 WCT International – Singles =

Tennis tournament event

Singles
- 1975 WCT International

Final
- Champion: (Sweden) Björn Borg
- Runner-up: (United States) Arthur Ashe
- Score: 7–6^{(7–4)}, 4–6, 7–6^{(7–4)}

Details
- Draw: 32
- Seeds: 8

Events
| Singles | Doubles |
| ← 1974 · | Bologna Indoor | · 1976 → |

The 1973 WCT International – Singles was an event of the 1975 WCT International men's tennis tournament that was played in Bologna in Italy from 6 February through 12 February 1975. Arthur Ashe was the defending champion. Second-seeded Björn Borg won the singles title, defeating first-seeded Arthur Ashe in the final, 7–6^{(7–4)}, 4–6, 7–6^{(7–4)}.

== Seeds ==
1. (United States) Arthur Ashe (final)
2. (Sweden) Björn Borg (champion)
3. (Netherlands) Tom Okker (semifinals)
4. (Australia) Kim Warwick (second round)
5. (New Zealand) Onny Parun (quarterfinals)
6. (Italy) Adriano Panatta (quarterfinals)
7. (Australia) Bob Giltinan (quarterfinals)
8. (Australia) Syd Ball (first round)

== Draw ==
=== Key ===
- Q = Qualifier
- WC = Wild card
- LL = Lucky loser
- Alt = Alternate
- ITF = ITF entry
- PR = Protected ranking
- SR = Special ranking
- SE = Special exempt
- JE = Junior exempt
- JR = Junior Accelerator Programme entrant
- CO = College Accelerator Programme entrant
- NG = Next Gen Accelerator Program entrant
- w/o = Walkover
- r = Retired
- d = Defaulted

=== Finals ===
Semifinals
2 | (Sweden) Björn Borg | 6 | 6
3 | (Netherlands) Tom Okker | 4 | 2
(South Africa) Bob Hewitt | 2 | 4
1 | (United States) Arthur Ashe | 6 | 6

Final
2 | (Sweden) Björn Borg | 7^{7} | 4 | 7^{7}
1 | (United States) Arthur Ashe | 6^{4} | 6 | 6^{4}

=== Top half ===
First Round
2 | (Sweden) Björn Borg | 6 | 6
(Italy) Piero Toci | 3 | 2
(Italy) Massimo Di Domenico | 6 | 0 | 6^{5}
(Italy) Vincenzo Franchitti | 2 | 6 | 7^{7}
(United States) Steve Krulevitz | 6^{5} | 2
(United States) Dick Dell | 7^{7} | 6
(Socialist Federal Republic of Yugoslavia) Nikola Pilić | 6 | 1 | 7^{7}
8 | (Australia) Syd Ball | 3 | 6 | 6^{5}
7 | (Australia) Bob Giltinan | 7^{7} | 6
(Spain) José Higueras | 6^{3} | 3
(South Africa) Frew McMillan | 0 | 6 | 6
(United Kingdom) John Lloyd | 6 | 4 | 4
(France) Patrice Dominguez | 7^{7} | 6
(Italy) Tonino Zugarelli | 6^{2} | 3
(United Kingdom) Buster Mottram | 7^{7} | 1 | 2
3 | (Netherlands) Tom Okker | 6^{4} | 6 | 6

Second Round
2 | (Sweden) Björn Borg | 6 | 6
(Italy) Vincenzo Franchitti | 2 | 3
(United States) Dick Dell | 4 | 6 | 4
(Socialist Federal Republic of Yugoslavia) Nikola Pilić | 6 | 4 | 6
7 | (Australia) Bob Giltinan | 6 | 6
(South Africa) Frew McMillan | 3 | 2
(France) Patrice Dominguez | 4 | 7 | 6^{6}
3 | (Netherlands) Tom Okker | 6 | 5 | 7^{8}

Quarterfinals
2 | (Sweden) Björn Borg | 6 | 6
(Socialist Federal Republic of Yugoslavia) Nikola Pilić | 4 | 3
7 | (Australia) Bob Giltinan | 3 | 2
3 | (Netherlands) Tom Okker | 6 | 6

Semifinals
2 | (Sweden) Björn Borg | 6 | 6
3 | (Netherlands) Tom Okker | 4 | 2

=== Bottom half ===
First Round
4 | (Australia) Kim Warwick | 6 | 6
(Hungary) Balázs Taróczy | 0 | 2
(South Africa) Bob Hewitt | 7 | 4 | 7^{7}
(Austria) Hans Kary | 5 | 6 | 6^{5}
(Italy) Ezio Di Matteo | 3 | 4
(Australia) Dick Crealy | 6 | 6
(Socialist Federal Republic of Yugoslavia) Željko Franulović | 2 | 2
6 | (Italy) Adriano Panatta | 6 | 6
5 | (New Zealand) Onny Parun | 6 | 7
(United States) Sherwood Stewart | 3 | 5
(Italy) Paolo Bertolucci | 6 | 6
(United States) Fred McNair | 4 | 4
(West Germany) Hans-Jürgen Pohmann | 6 | 6
(Italy) Fabrizio Matteoli | 0 | 2
(Italy) Corrado Barazzutti | 6 | 6^{5} | 2
1 | (United States) Arthur Ashe | 3 | 7^{7} | 6

Second Round
4 | (Australia) Kim Warwick | 3 | 2
(South Africa) Bob Hewitt | 6 | 6
(Australia) Dick Crealy | 3 | 6^{4}
6 | (Italy) Adriano Panatta | 6 | 7^{7}
5 | (New Zealand) Onny Parun | 3 | 6 | 6
(Italy) Paolo Bertolucci | 6 | 3 | 1
(West Germany) Hans-Jürgen Pohmann | 4 | 6 | 1
1 | (United States) Arthur Ashe | 6 | 3 | 6

Quarterfinals
(South Africa) Bob Hewitt | 7^{7} | 3 | 6
6 | (Italy) Adriano Panatta | 6^{5} | 6 | 1
5 | (New Zealand) Onny Parun | 2 | 4
1 | (United States) Arthur Ashe | 6 | 6

Semifinals
(South Africa) Bob Hewitt | 2 | 4
1 | (United States) Arthur Ashe | 6 | 6
