= 1969 British Hard Court Championships =

- Date: 28 April – 3 May
- Edition: 40th
- Category: ILTF
- Draw: 32S/16D
- Surface: Clay / outdoor
- Location: Bournemouth, England
- Venue: The West Hants Club

Champions

Men's singles
- (Australia) John Newcombe

Women's singles
- (Australia) Margaret Court

Men's doubles
- (South Africa) Bob Hewitt / (South Africa) Frew McMillan

Women's doubles
- (Australia) Margaret Court / (Australia) Judy Tegart

Mixed doubles
- (United Kingdom) Virginia Wade / (South Africa) Bob Maud
← 1968 ·	British Hard Court Championships	· 1970 →

The 1969 British Hard Court Championships was a combined men's and women's tennis tournament played on outdoor clay courts at The West Hants Club in Bournemouth in England. It was the 40th edition of the tournament and the second edition in the Open Era of tennis. The tournament was held from 28 April through 3 May 1969. John Newcombe, seeded first, and Margaret Court won the first open singles titles while the men's team of Bob Hewitt and Frew McMillan and the women's team of Margaret Court and Judy Tegart won the doubles titles. The poor state of the courts led to a protest by a number of players. The tournament made a financial loss due to higher expenses compared to the previous edition and poor weather during the final two days.

== Finals ==
=== Men's singles ===
(Australia) John Newcombe defeated (South Africa) Bob Hewitt 6–8, 6–3, 5–7, 6–4, 6–4

=== Women's singles ===
(Australia) Margaret Court defeated (United Kingdom) Winnie Shaw 5–7, 6–4, 6–4

=== Men's doubles ===
(South Africa) Bob Hewitt / (South Africa) Frew McMillan defeated (France) Jean-Claude Barclay / (United Kingdom) Robert Wilson 6–4, 6–2, 2–6, 9–7

=== Women's doubles ===
(Australia) Margaret Court / (Australia) Judy Tegart defeated (Netherlands) Ada Bakker / (Netherlands) Marijke Schaar 6–1, 6–4

=== Mixed doubles ===
(United Kingdom) Virginia Wade / (South Africa) Bob Maud defeated (Australia) Fay Toyne-Moore / (Australia) Jimmy Moore 6–2, 6–2
