= 1995 Rover British Clay Court Championships =

- Date: 15–20 May
- Edition: 9th
- Category: Tier IV
- Draw: 32S / 16D
- Prize money: $107,500
- Surface: Clay / outdoor
- Location: Bournemouth, England
- Venue: West Hants Tennis Club

Champions

Singles
- (Czech Republic) Ludmila Richterová

Doubles
- (South Africa) Mariaan de Swardt / (Romania) Ruxandra Dragomir
← 1983 ·	British Hard Court Championships	· 1996 →

The 1995 Rover British Clay Court Championships was a women's tennis tournament played on outdoor clay courts at West Hants Tennis Club in Bournemouth in the United Kingdom that was part of the Tier IV category of the 1995 WTA Tour. It was the ninth edition of the tournament and was held from 15 to 20 May 1995. Unseeded Ludmila Richterová won the singles title.

== Finals ==
=== Singles ===
(Czech Republic) Ludmila Richterová defeated (Canada) Patricia Hy-Boulais 6–7, 6–4, 6–3

- It was Richterova's only title of the year and the 1st of her career.

=== Doubles ===
(South Africa) Mariaan de Swardt / (Romania) Ruxandra Dragomir defeated (Australia) Kerry-Anne Guse / (Canada) Patricia Hy-Boulais 6–3, 7–5

- It was de Swardt's only title of the year and the 1st of her career. It was Dragomir's only title of the year and the 2nd of her career.
