= 1978 Italian Indoor Open =

- Date: 20–26 November
- Edition: 4th
- Category: Grand Prix
- Draw: 32S / 16D
- Prize money: $50,000
- Surface: Carpet / indoor
- Location: Bologna, Italy

Champions

Singles
- (United States) Peter Fleming

Doubles
- (United States) Peter Fleming / (United States) John McEnroe
← 1975 ·	Bologna Indoor	· 1979 →

The 1978 Italian Indoor Open, also known as the Bologna Open or Bologna WCT, was a men's tennis tournament played on indoor carpet courts that was part of the 1978 Colgate-Palmolive Grand Prix circuit and took place in Bologna, Italy. It was the fourth edition of the tournament and was held from 20 November through 26 November 1978. Fifth-seeded Peter Fleming won the singles title and earned $8,600 first prize money.

== Finals ==
=== Singles ===
(United States) Peter Fleming defeated (Italy) Adriano Panatta 6–2, 7–6^{(7–5)}

- It was Fleming's only singles title of the year and the first of his career.

=== Doubles ===
(United States) Peter Fleming / (United States) John McEnroe defeated (France) Jean-Louis Haillet / (Italy) Antonio Zugarelli 6–1, 6–4
