= 1996 Rover British Clay Court Championships – Doubles =

Doubles
- 1996 Rover British Clay Court Championships
- 1995 Champions: (South Africa) Mariaan de Swardt; (Romania) Ruxandra Dragomir

Final
- Champions: (United States) Katrina Adams; (South Africa) Mariaan de Swardt
- Runners-up: (Belgium) Els Callens; (Belgium) Laurence Courtois
- Score: 6–0, 6–4

Details
- Draw: 16
- Seeds: 4

Events
Singles	Doubles
← 1995 ·	Rover British Clay Court Championships

Mariaan de Swardt and Ruxandra Dragomir were the defending champions but only de Swardt competed that year with Katrina Adams.

Adams and de Swardt won in the final 6–0, 6–4 against Els Callens and Laurence Courtois.

== Seeds ==
Champion seeds are indicated in bold text while text in italics indicates the round in which those seeds were eliminated.

1. (United States) **Katrina Adams** / (South Africa) **Mariaan de Swardt (champions)**
2. (Canada) Jill Hetherington / (Australia) Kristine Radford (first round)
3. (Belgium) Els Callens / (Belgium) Laurence Courtois (final)
4. (Australia) Kerry-Anne Guse / (Canada) Patricia Hy-Boulais (semifinals)

== Draw ==
=== Key ===
- Q = Qualifier
- WC = Wild card
- LL = Lucky loser
- Alt = Alternate
- ITF = ITF entry
- PR = Protected ranking
- SR = Special ranking
- SE = Special exempt
- JE = Junior exempt
- JR = Junior Accelerator Programme entrant
- CO = College Accelerator Programme entrant
- NG = Next Gen Accelerator Program entrant
- w/o = Walkover
- r = Retired
- d = Defaulted

First round

Quarterfinals

Semifinals

Final

1
- (United States) K Adams
- (South Africa) M de Swardt
**6**
**6**

WC
- (United Kingdom) C Taylor
- (United Kingdom) J Wood
3
2

1
- (United States) K Adams
- (South Africa) M de Swardt
**7**
**6**

- (United Kingdom) V Lake
- (Germany) V Martinek
5
2

- (Belgium) S Appelmans
- (Netherlands) M Oremans
6
3

- (Belgium) S Appelmans
- (Netherlands) M Oremans
**7**
**6**

1
- (United States) K Adams
- (South Africa) M de Swardt
5
**6**
**6**

4
- (Australia) K-A Guse
- (Canada) P Hy-Boulais
**6**
1
**6**

4
- (Australia) K-A Guse
- (Canada) P Hy-Boulais
**7**
3
0

LL
- (United Kingdom) L Ahl
- (United Kingdom) J Ward
3
**6**
4

4
- (Australia) K-A Guse
- (Canada) P Hy-Boulais
**6**
**6**

- (Russia) J Lutrova
- (Australia) T Morton-Rodgers
**6**
**7**

- (Russia) J Lutrova
- (Australia) T Morton-Rodgers
4
1

Q
- (United Kingdom) J Pullin
- (United Kingdom) L Woodroffe
4
6

1
- (United States) Katrina Adams
- (South Africa) Mariaan de Swardt
**6**
**6**

- (France) L Ghirardi
- (Belgium) D Van Roost
1
5

3
- (Belgium) Els Callens
- (Belgium) Laurence Courtois
0
4

- (Argentina) L Montalvo
- (Argentina) P Suárez
**6**
**7**

- (Argentina) L Montalvo
- (Argentina) P Suárez
**6**
4
2

- (Japan) N Kijimuta
- (United Kingdom) C Wood
3
5

3
- (Belgium) E Callens
- (Belgium) L Courtois
4
**6**
**6**

3
- (Belgium) E Callens
- (Belgium) L Courtois
**6**
**7**

3
- (Belgium) E Callens
- (Belgium) L Courtois
3
**7**
**7**

- (Slovakia) H Nagyová
- (Argentina) M Paz
**7**
2
2

- (Canada) S Jeyaseelan
- (Canada) R Simpson
**6**
5
6

- (United Kingdom) S-A Siddall
- (United Kingdom) A Wainwright
6
**6**
**6**

- (United Kingdom) S-A Siddall
- (United Kingdom) A Wainwright
2
3

- (Canada) S Jeyaseelan
- (Canada) R Simpson
**7**
**6**

- (Canada) S Jeyaseelan
- (Canada) R Simpson
**6**
**6**

2
- (Canada) J Hetherington
- (Australia) K Radford
5
2
