= 1995 Rover British Clay Court Championships – Doubles =

Doubles
- 1995 Rover British Clay Court Championships

Final
- Champions: (South Africa) Mariaan de Swardt; (Romania) Ruxandra Dragomir
- Runners-up: (Australia) Kerry-Anne Guse; (Canada) Patricia Hy-Boulais
- Score: 6–3, 7–5

Details
- Draw: 16
- Seeds: 4

Events
Singles	Doubles
← 1994 ·	British Hard Court Championships	· 1996 →

Mariaan de Swardt and Ruxandra Dragomir won in the final 6–3, 7–5 against Kerry-Anne Guse and Patricia Hy-Boulais.

== Seeds ==
Champion seeds are indicated in bold text while text in italics indicates the round in which those seeds were eliminated.

1. (Italy) Laura Golarsa / (Netherlands) Caroline Vis (quarterfinals)
2. (United States) Debbie Graham / (Canada) Jill Hetherington (quarterfinals)
3. (Sweden) Åsa Carlsson / (United States) Patty Fendick (quarterfinals)
4. (Sweden) Maria Lindström / (Sweden) Maria Strandlund (quarterfinals)

== Draw ==
=== Key ===
- Q = Qualifier
- WC = Wild card
- LL = Lucky loser
- Alt = Alternate
- SE = Special exempt
- PR = Protected ranking
- ITF = ITF entry
- JE = Junior exempt
- w/o = Walkover
- r = Retired
- d = Defaulted
- SR = Special ranking

First round

Quarterfinals

Semifinals

Final

1
- (Italy) L Golarsa
- (Netherlands) C Vis
**6**
**6**

Q
- (United Kingdom) S-A Siddall
- (United Kingdom) A Wainwright
3
1

1
- (Italy) L Golarsa
- (Netherlands) C Vis
**6**
0
1

- (United Kingdom) J Durie
- (United Kingdom) C Wood
4
**7**
**6**

- (United Kingdom) J Durie
- (United Kingdom) C Wood
2
**6**
**6**

- (South Africa) L Horn
- (United States) L Lee
**6**
5
2

- (United Kingdom) J Durie
- (United Kingdom) C Wood
3
2

3
- (Sweden) Å Carlsson
- (United States) P Fendick
3
**6**
**6**

- (South Africa) M de Swardt
- (Romania) R Dragomir
**6**
**6**

- (Czech Republic) P Langrová
- (Czech Republic) L Richterová
**6**
3
4

3
- (Sweden) Å Carlsson
- (United States) P Fendick
**6**
4
2

WC
- (United Kingdom) J Pullin
- (United Kingdom) L Woodroffe
5
5

- (South Africa) M de Swardt
- (Romania) R Dragomir
2
**6**
**6**

- (South Africa) M de Swardt
- (Romania) R Dragomir
**7**
**7**

- (South Africa) Mariaan de Swardt
- (Romania) Ruxandra Dragomir
**6**
**7**

- (Czech Republic) R Bobková
- (South Africa) J Kruger

- (Australia) Kerry-Anne Guse
- (Canada) Patricia Hy-Boulais
3
5

- (Australia) K-A Guse
- (Canada) P Hy-Boulais
**w/o**

- (Australia) K-A Guse
- (Canada) P Hy-Boulais
**6**
6
**7**

- (Australia) K Godridge
- (Australia) K Sharpe
1
**6**
6

4
- (Sweden) M Lindström
- (Sweden) M Strandlund
3
**7**
6

4
- (Sweden) M Lindström
- (Sweden) M Strandlund
**6**
2
**7**

- (Australia) K-A Guse
- (Canada) P Hy-Boulais
**6**
5
**6**

- (Japan) M Endo
- (Japan) A Sugiyama
0
**6**
6

- (United States) C Rubin
- (United States) J Steven
3
**7**
2

- (United States) C Rubin
- (United States) J Steven
**6**
3
**7**

- (United States) C Rubin
- (United States) J Steven
**6**
**6**

LL
- (Australia) A Ellwood
- (Austria) B Schett
4
3

2
- (United States) D Graham
- (Canada) J Hetherington
2
3

2
- (United States) D Graham
- (Canada) J Hetherington
**6**
**6**
