= 1973 British Hard Court Championships =

- Date: 7–12 May
- Edition: 44th
- Category: Grand Prix (B/C class)
- Draw: 64S / 32D (men); 32S / 16D (women)
- Surface: Clay / outdoor
- Location: Bournemouth, England
- Venue: The West Hants Club

Champions

Men's singles
- (Italy) Adriano Panatta

Women's singles
- (United Kingdom) Virginia Wade

Men's doubles
- (Spain) Juan Gisbert / (Romania) Ilie Năstase

Women's doubles
- (Australia) Patricia Coleman / (Australia) Wendy Turnbull

Mixed doubles
- (United Kingdom) Virginia Wade / (South Africa) Frew McMillan
← 1972 ·	British Hard Court Championships	· 1974 →

The 1973 British Hard Court Championships, also known by its sponsored name Rothmans British Hard Court Championships, was a combined men's and women's tennis tournament played on outdoor clay courts at The West Hants Club in Bournemouth, England. The event was part of the Grand Prix circuit and the event was categorized as B class for the men and C class for the women. The tournament was held from 7 May through 12 May 1973. Adriano Panatta and Virginia Wade won the singles titles.

== Finals ==
=== Men's singles ===
(Italy) Adriano Panatta defeated (Romania) Ilie Năstase 6–8, 7–5, 6–3, 8–6

=== Women's singles ===
(United Kingdom) Virginia Wade defeated (Australia) Evonne Goolagong 6–4, 6–4

=== Men's doubles ===
(Spain) Juan Gisbert / (South Africa) Ilie Năstase defeated (Italy) Adriano Panatta / (Romania) Ion Țiriac 6–4, 8–6

=== Women's doubles ===
(Australia) Patricia Coleman / (Australia) Wendy Turnbull defeated (Australia) Evonne Goolagong / (Australia) Janet Young 7–5, 7–5

=== Mixed doubles ===
(United Kingdom) Virginia Wade / (South Africa) Frew McMillan defeated (South Africa) Bernard Mitton / (South Africa) Ilana Kloss 6–2, 6–3
