= ATP Bologna =

The ATP Bologna can refer to two men's professional tennis tournaments held in Bologna, Italy:

- the ATP Bologna Indoor, an indoor carpet court event held from 1978 to 1981
- the ATP Bologna Outdoor, an outdoor clay court event held from 1985 to 1998
