= 1971 British Hard Court Championships =

- Date: 16–22 May
- Edition: 42nd
- Category: Grand Prix (B class)
- Draw: 32S / 16D
- Surface: Clay / outdoor
- Location: Bournemouth, England
- Venue: The West Hants Club

Champions

Men's singles
- (United Kingdom) Gerald Battrick

Women's singles
- (Australia) Margaret Court

Men's doubles
- (Australia) Bill Bowrey / (Australia) Owen Davidson

Women's doubles
- (United States) Mary–Ann Curtis / (France) Françoise Dürr
← 1970 ·	British Hard Court Championships	· 1972 →

The 1971 British Hard Court Championships was a combined men's and women's tennis tournament played on outdoor clay courts at The West Hants Club in Bournemouth, England. The event was part of the 1971 Pepsi-Cola Grand Prix and categorized as B class. The tournament was held from 16 to 22 May 1971. Gerald Battrick and Margaret Court won the singles titles.

== Finals ==
=== Men's singles ===
(United Kingdom) Gerald Battrick defeated (Socialist Federal Republic of Yugoslavia) Željko Franulović 6–3, 6–2, 5–7, 6–0

=== Women's singles ===
(Australia) Margaret Court defeated (Australia) Evonne Goolagong 7–5, 6–1

=== Men's doubles ===
(Australia) Bill Bowrey / (Australia) Owen Davidson defeated (Chile) Patricio Cornejo / (Chile) Jaime Fillol 8–6, 6–2, 3–6, 4–6, 6–4

=== Women's doubles ===
(United States) Mary–Ann Curtis / (France) Françoise Dürr defeated (Australia) Margaret Court / (Australia) Evonne Goolagong 6–3, 5–7, 6–4
