= 1970 British Hard Court Championships =

- Date: 27 April – 2 May
- Edition: 41st
- Category: Grand Prix (Class 2)
- Draw: 32S/16D
- Surface: Clay / outdoor
- Location: Bournemouth, England
- Venue: West Hants Tennis Club

Champions

Men's singles
- (United Kingdom) Mark Cox

Women's singles
- (Australia) Margaret Court

Men's doubles
- (Netherlands) Tom Okker / (Australia) Tony Roche

Women's doubles
- (Australia) Margaret Court / (Australia) Judy Tegart

Mixed doubles
- (United States) Billie Jean King / (South Africa) Bob Hewitt
← 1969 ·	British Hard Court Championships	· 1971 →

The 1970 British Hard Court Championships, also known by its sponsored name Rothmans Open Hard Court Championships of Great Britain, was a combined men's and women's tennis tournament played on outdoor clay courts at the West Hants Tennis Club in Bournemouth in the United Kingdom. The men's events were part of the 1970 Pepsi-Cola Grand Prix circuit and categorized as Class 2. It was the 41st edition of the tournament and was held from 27 April to 2 May 1970. Mark Cox and Margaret Court won the singles titles. Cox won £2,000 first-prize money while Court, who successfully defended her 1969 title, received £1,000 for her singles win.

== Finals ==
=== Men's singles ===
(United Kingdom) Mark Cox defeated (South Africa) Bob Hewitt 6–1, 6–2, 6–3

=== Women's singles ===
(Australia) Margaret Court defeated (United Kingdom) Virginia Wade 6–2, 6–3

=== Men's doubles ===
(Netherlands) Tom Okker / (Australia) Tony Roche defeated (Australia) William Bowrey / (Australia) Owen Davidson 2–6, 6–4, 6–4, 6–4

=== Women's doubles ===
(Australia) Margaret Court / (Australia) Judy Tegart defeated (United States) Rosie Casals / (United States) Billie Jean King 6–2, 6–8, 7–5

=== Mixed doubles ===
(United States) Billie Jean King / (South Africa) Bob Hewitt defeated (United Kingdom) Virginia Wade / (South Africa) Bob Maud 6–2, 6–2
