= 1968 British Hard Court Championships – Men's singles =

Men's singles
- 1968 British Hard Court Championships

Final
- Champion: (Australia) Ken Rosewall
- Runner-up: (Australia) Rod Laver
- Score: 3–6, 6–2, 6–0, 6–3

Details
- Draw: 32
- Seeds: 8

Events
Singles	men	women
Doubles	men	women
- British Hard Court Championships

Jan-Erik Lundqvist was the defending champion, but did not compete in the 1968 edition of the tournament. Ken Rosewall became the first men's singles winner of an Open Era tennis tournament after defeating Rod Laver in the final.

== Seeds ==
1. (Australia) Rod Laver (finals)
2. (Australia) Ken Rosewall (champion)
3. (Spain) Andrés Gimeno (semifinals)
4. (United States) Pancho Gonzales (second round)
5. (Australia) Roy Emerson (quarterfinals)
6. (Australia) Fred Stolle (quarterfinals)
7. (Australia) Owen Davidson (quarterfinals)
8. (United Kingdom) Robert Wilson (quarterfinals)

== Draw ==
Key

- Q = Qualifier
- WC = Wild card
- LL = Lucky loser
- Alt = Alternate
- ITF = ITF entry
- PR = Protected ranking
- SR = Special ranking
- SE = Special exempt
- JE = Junior exempt
- JR = Junior Accelerator Programme entrant
- CO = College Accelerator Programme entrant
- NG = Next Gen Accelerator Program entrant
- w/o = Walkover
- r = Retired
- d = Defaulted

=== Finals ===
Semifinals
1	(Australia) Rod Laver	6	6	6
(United Kingdom) Mark Cox	4	1	0
3	(Spain) Andrés Gimeno	2	1	3
2	(Australia) Ken Rosewall	6	6	6

Final
1	(Australia) Rod Laver	6	2	0	3
2	(Australia) Ken Rosewall	3	6	6	6

=== Top half ===
First round
1	(Australia) R Laver	6	6	6
Q	(South Africa) R Krog	1	2	2
(Canada) K Carpenter	2	5	1
(United Kingdom) J Barrett	6	7	6
8	(United Kingdom) R Wilson	4	8	13	12
(United Kingdom) G Battrick	6	6	11	10
(United Kingdom) P Hutchins	6	0	r
13	(United Kingdom) J Ward	3	1
4	(United States) P Gonzales	6	6	6
(United Kingdom) C Iles	2	1	1
(South Africa) M Baleson	2	1	6
(United Kingdom) M Cox	6	6	8
5	(Australia) R Emerson	6	8	6
(Australia) J Moore	1	6	4
(United Kingdom) T Pickard	0	2	3
(United Kingdom) DJ Lloyd	6	6	6

Second round
1	(Australia) R Laver	8	6	6
(United Kingdom) J Barrett	6	0	2
8	(United Kingdom) R Wilson	6	6	6
(United Kingdom) J Ward	3	2	4
4	(United States) P Gonzales	6	2	6	3	3
(United Kingdom) M Cox	0	6	4	6	6
5	(Australia) R Emerson	6	6	1	6
(United Kingdom) D Lloyd	1	4	6	3

Quarterfinals
1	(Australia) R Laver	6	8	6
8	(United Kingdom) R Wilson	2	6	2
(United Kingdom) M Cox	6	6	7
5	(Australia) R Emerson	0	1	5

Semifinals
1	(Australia) R Laver	6	6	6
(United Kingdom) M Cox	4	1	0

=== Bottom half ===
First round
(United Kingdom) K Wooldridge	6	6	6
(United Kingdom) E Beards	4	2	1
(United Kingdom) P Curtis	7	4	12	1
6	(Australia) F Stolle	5	6	14	6
(United Kingdom) J Paish	3	4	1
(Chile) L Ayala	6	6	6
WC	(United Kingdom) S Matthews	6	4	1	2
3	(Spain) A Gimeno	4	6	6	6
6	(Australia) R Howe	6	6	6
(United Kingdom) J. P. R. Williams	3	3	1
(United Kingdom) J Clifton	2	3	6	6
7	(Australia) O Davidson	6	6	4	8
(Australia) J Bartlett	3	2	0
(South Africa) G Gardner	6	6	6
(United Kingdom) G Bluett	3	2	4
2	(Australia) K Rosewall	6	6	6

Second round
(United Kingdom) K Wooldridge	6	7	7	2	0
6	(Australia) F Stolle	8	5	5	6	6
(Chile) L Ayala	1	0	0
3	(Spain) A Gimeno	6	6	6
(Australia) R Howe	4	3	2
7	(Australia) O Davidson	6	6	6
(South Africa) G Gardner	0	2	4
2	(Australia) K Rosewall	6	6	6

Quarterfinals
6	(Australia) F Stolle	2	1	0
3	(Spain) A Gimeno	6	6	6
7	(Australia) O Davidson	3	5	3
2	(Australia) K Rosewall	6	7	6

Semifinals
3	(Spain) A Gimeno	2	1	3
2	(Australia) K Rosewall	6	6	6
