= 1980 Italian Indoor Open =

- Date: 17–23 November
- Edition: 6th
- Category: Grand Prix
- Draw: 32S / 16D
- Prize money: $75,000
- Surface: Carpet / indoor
- Location: Bologna, Italy

Champions

Singles
- (Czechoslovakia) Tomáš Šmíd

Doubles
- (Hungary) Balázs Taróczy / (United States) Butch Walts
← 1979 ·	Bologna Indoor	· 1981 →

The 1980 Italian Indoor Open, also known as the Bologna Open or Bologna Indoor, was a men's tennis tournament played on indoor carpet courts that was part of the 1980 Volvo Grand Prix circuit and took place in Bologna, Italy. It was the sixth edition of the tournament and was held from 17 November through 23 November 1980. Fifth-seeded Tomáš Šmíd won the singles title.

== Finals ==
=== Singles ===
(Czechoslovakia) Tomáš Šmíd defeated (Italy) Paolo Bertolucci 6–3, 6–2

- It was Šmíd's 2nd and last singles title of the year and the 4th of his career.

=== Doubles ===
(Hungary) Balázs Taróczy / (United States) Butch Walts defeated (United States) Steve Denton / (Australia) Paul McNamee 2–6, 6–3, 6–0
