= 1979 Italian Indoor Open =

- Date: 19–25 November
- Edition: 5th
- Category: Grand Prix
- Draw: 32S / 16D
- Prize money: $75,000
- Surface: Carpet / indoor
- Location: Bologna, Italy

Champions

Singles
- (United States) Butch Walts

Doubles
- (United States) Peter Fleming / (United States) John McEnroe
← 1978 ·	Bologna Indoor	· 1980 →

The 1979 Italian Indoor Open, also known as the Bologna Open or Bologna Indoor, was a men's tennis tournament played on indoor carpet courts that was part of the 1979 Colgate-Palmolive Grand Prix circuit and took place in Bologna, Italy. It was the fifth edition of the tournament and was held from 19 November through 25 November 1979. Fourth-seeded Butch Walts won the singles title.

== Finals ==
=== Singles ===
(United States) Butch Walts defeated (Italy) Gianni Ocleppo 6–3, 6–2

- It was Walts' 2nd and last singles title of the year and the 4th and last of his career.

=== Doubles ===
(United States) Peter Fleming / (United States) John McEnroe defeated (United States) Fritz Buehning / (United States) Ferdi Taygan 6–1, 6–1
