= 1972 British Hard Court Championships =

- Date: 8–13 May
- Edition: 43rd
- Category: Grand Prix (C class)
- Draw: 32S / 16D
- Surface: Clay / outdoor
- Location: Bournemouth, England
- Venue: The West Hants Club

Champions

Men's singles
- (South Africa) Bob Hewitt

Women's singles
- (Australia) Evonne Goolagong

Men's doubles
- (South Africa) Bob Hewitt / (South Africa) Frew McMillan

Women's doubles
- (United States) Mary–Ann Curtis / (France) Françoise Dürr
← 1971 ·	British Hard Court Championships	· 1973 →

The 1972 British Hard Court Championships, also known by its sponsored name Rothmans British Hard Court Championships, was a combined men's and women's tennis tournament played on outdoor clay courts at The West Hants Club in Bournemouth, England. The event was part of the Grand Prix circuit and categorized as B class. The tournament was held from 8 to 13 May 1972. Bob Hewitt and Evonne Goolagong won the singles titles.

== Finals ==
=== Men's singles ===
(South Africa) Bob Hewitt defeated (France) Pierre Barthès 6–2, 6–4, 6–3

=== Women's singles ===
(Australia) Evonne Goolagong defeated (West Germany) Helga Niessen Masthoff 6–0, 6–4

=== Men's doubles ===
(South Africa) Bob Hewitt / (South Africa) Frew McMillan defeated (Romania) Ilie Năstase / (Romania) Ion Țiriac 8–6, 6–2, 3–6, 4–6, 6–4

=== Women's doubles ===
(Australia) Evonne Goolagong / (Australia) Helen Gourlay defeated (South Africa) Brenda Kirk / (Netherlands) Betty Stöve 7–5, 6–1
