= 1974 Astor Cup =

- Date: 11–17 February
- Edition: 2nd
- Category: WCT circuit
- Draw: 32S / 16D
- Prize money: $50,000
- Surface: Carpet / indoor
- Location: Bologna, Italy

Champions

Singles
- (United States) Arthur Ashe

Doubles
- (Sweden) Ove Nils Bengtson / (Sweden) Björn Borg
- Bologna Indoor

The 1974 Astor Cup, also known as the Bologna Open or Bologna WCT, was a men's tennis tournament played on indoor carpet courts that was part of the Green Group of the 1974 World Championship Tennis circuit and took place in Bologna, Italy. It was the second edition of the tournament and was held from 11 February through 17 February 1974. Third-seeded Arthur Ashe won the singles title and earned $10,000 first prize money.

== Finals ==
=== Singles ===
(United States) Arthur Ashe defeated (United Kingdom) Mark Cox 6–4, 7–5

=== Doubles ===
(Sweden) Ove Nils Bengtson / (Sweden) Björn Borg defeated (United States) Arthur Ashe / (United States) Roscoe Tanner 6–4, 5–7, 4–6, 7–6, 6–2
