= 1975 WCT International – Doubles =

Tennis tournament event

Doubles
- 1975 WCT International

Final
- Champion: (Italy) Paolo Bertolucci (Italy) Adriano Panatta
- Runner-up: (United States) Arthur Ashe (Netherlands) Tom Okker
- Score: 76–3, 3–6, 6–3

Details
- Draw: 16
- Seeds: 4

Events
Singles	Doubles
- Bologna Indoor

The 1975 WCT International – Doubles was an event of the 1975 WCT International men's tennis tournament that was played in Bologna in Italy from 6 February through 12 February 1975. Ove Nils Bengtson and Björn Borg were the defending doubles champions but did not compete together in this edition. First-seeded Paolo Bertolucci and Adriano Panatta won the title, defeating unseeded Arthur Ashe and Tom Okker in the final, 6–3, 3–6, 6–3.

== Seeds ==
1. (Italy) Paolo Bertolucci / (Italy) Adriano Panatta (champions)
2. (South Africa) Bob Hewitt / (South Africa) Frew McMillan (semifinals)
3. (Austria) Hans Kary / (United States) Fred McNair (semifinals)
4. (United Kingdom) Buster Mottram / (Germany) Hans-Jürgen Pohmann (quarterfinals)

== Draw ==
Key

- Q = Qualifier
- WC = Wild card
- LL = Lucky loser
- Alt = Alternate
- ITF = ITF entry
- PR = Protected ranking
- SR = Special ranking
- SE = Special exempt
- JE = Junior exempt
- JR = Junior Accelerator Programme entrant
- CO = College Accelerator Programme entrant
- NG = Next Gen Accelerator Program entrant
- w/o = Walkover
- r = Retired
- d = Defaulted

First Round
1	(Italy) Paolo Bertolucci (Italy) Adriano Panatta	6	6
(United States) Steve Krulevitz (United Kingdom) John Lloyd	1	4
(Italy) Massimo Di Domenico (Italy) Fabrizio Matteoli	2	2
(Australia) Dick Crealy (New Zealand) Onny Parun	6	6
(France) Patrice Dominguez (Australia) Kim Warwick	6	6
(Socialist Federal Republic of Yugoslavia) Željko Franulović (Socialist Federal Republic of Yugoslavia) Nikola Pilić	3	2
(Spain) José Higueras (Hungary) Balázs Taróczy	4	4
3	(Austria) Hans Kary (United States) Fred McNair	6	6
4	(United Kingdom) Buster Mottram (West Germany) Hans-Jürgen Pohmann	6	6	6
(Australia) Syd Ball (Australia) Bob Giltinan	7	2	3
(United States) Arthur Ashe (Netherlands) Tom Okker	6	6
(Italy) Ezio Di Matteo (Italy) Piero Toci	4	1
(Italy) Corrado Barazzutti (Italy) Tonino Zugarelli	5	6	6^{1}
(Sweden) Björn Borg (Italy) Vincenzo Franchitti	7	2	7^{7}
(United States) Dick Dell (United States) Sherwood Stewart	2	2
2	(South Africa) Bob Hewitt (South Africa) Frew McMillan	6	6

Quarterfinals
1	(Italy) Paolo Bertolucci (Italy) Adriano Panatta	7^{7}	6
(Australia) Dick Crealy (New Zealand) Onny Parun	6^{2}	0
(France) Patrice Dominguez (Australia) Kim Warwick	1	6	6^{2}
3	(Austria) Hans Kary (United States) Fred McNair	6	1	7^{7}
4	(United Kingdom) Buster Mottram (West Germany) Hans-Jürgen Pohmann	6^{6}	2
(United States) Arthur Ashe (Netherlands) Tom Okker	7^{8}	6
(Sweden) Björn Borg (Italy) Vincenzo Franchitti	6	4	1
2	(South Africa) Bob Hewitt (South Africa) Frew McMillan	4	6	6

Semifinals
1	(Italy) Paolo Bertolucci (Italy) Adriano Panatta	6^{6}	6	7^{7}
3	(Austria) Hans Kary (United States) Fred McNair	7^{8}	2	6^{4}
(United States) Arthur Ashe (Netherlands) Tom Okker	6	3	6
2	(South Africa) Bob Hewitt (South Africa) Frew McMillan	3	6	3

Final
1	(Italy) Paolo Bertolucci (Italy) Adriano Panatta	6	3	6
(United States) Arthur Ashe (Netherlands) Tom Okker	3	6	3
