= 1968 British Hard Court Championships =

- Date: 22–27 April
- Edition: 39th
- Category: ILTF
- Draw: 32S / 16D
- Surface: Clay / outdoor
- Location: Bournemouth, England
- Venue: The West Hants Club
- Attendance: ~30,000

Champions

Men's singles
- (Australia) Ken Rosewall

Women's singles
- (United Kingdom) Virginia Wade

Men's doubles
- (Australia) Roy Emerson / (Australia) Rod Laver

Women's doubles
- (United Kingdom) Christine Truman Janes/Nell Truman

Mixed doubles
- (United Kingdom) Virginia Wade / (Australia) Bob Howe
- British Hard Court Championships

The 1968 British Hard Court Championships was a combined men's and women's tennis tournament played on outdoor clay courts at The West Hants Club in Bournemouth in England. It was the first tournament in the Open Era of tennis. The tournament was held from 22 April to 27 April 1968. Ken Rosewall and Virginia Wade won the first open singles titles while the men's team of Roy Emerson and Rod Laver and the women's team of Christine Truman Janes and Nell Truman won the first open doubles titles.

== First tournament of the Open Era ==
The 1968 British Hard Court Championships (BHCC) holds the distinction of being the first Open Era tennis tournament. Prior to this tournament professional players were banned by the International Lawn Tennis Federation (ILTF) from competing in tournaments, including the Grand Slams, which were organized by the ILTF and its national organizations. Although all players, amateurs and professionals, were allowed to compete at the 1968 BHCC the players who were part of the World Championship Tennis (WCT) circuit did not participate. Players from the rival National Tennis League (NTL) did enter and in the men's singles event made up the first six seeds.

The tournament started on 22 April at 1:43 p.m., when John Clifton served and won the first point of the Open Era. Clifton lost his first-round match to Owen Davidson who thus became the first winner of an Open Era tennis match. Ken Rosewall won the men's singles title, taking home $2,400, while runner-up Rod Laver received $1,200. Their final was suspended in the second set due to rain and was finished the following day. Virginia Wade won the women's singles title, defeating Winnie Shaw in the final, but did not take home the winner's prize of $720 as she was still an amateur at the time of the tournament. She subsequently became the first amateur to win a title in the Open Era. Christine Janes and her sister Nell Truman became the first winners of an open tennis event by winning the women's doubles title.

The tournament was considered a success and attracted almost 30,000 visitors. Much of the public attention focused on the young British player Mark Cox, who made tennis history by becoming the first amateur player to beat a professional, when he defeated 39-year-old American Pancho Gonzales in five sets in a second-round match that lasted two and a quarter hours.

== Finals ==
=== Men's singles ===
(Australia) Ken Rosewall defeated (Australia) Rod Laver 3–6, 6–2, 6–0, 6–3

=== Women's singles ===
(United Kingdom) Virginia Wade defeated (United Kingdom) Winnie Shaw 6–4, 6–1

=== Men's doubles ===
(Australia) Roy Emerson / (Australia) Rod Laver defeated (Spain) Andrés Gimeno / (United States) Pancho Gonzales 8–6, 4–6, 6–3, 6–2

=== Women's doubles ===
(United Kingdom) Christine Truman Janes / (United Kingdom) Nell Truman defeated (Australia) Fay Toyne-Moore / (South Africa) Anette du Plooy 6–4, 6–3

=== Mixed doubles ===
(United Kingdom) Virginia Wade / (Australia) Bob Howe defeated (Australia) Fay Toyne-Moore / (Australia) Jimmy Moore 6–4, 6–3

== See also ==
- Laver–Rosewall rivalry
