= 1974 British Hard Court Championships =

- Date: 20 – 26 May
- Edition: 45th
- Category: Grand Prix (B class)
- Draw: 50S / 24D (men)
- Surface: Clay / outdoor
- Location: Bournemouth, England
- Venue: The West Hants Club

Champions

Men's singles
- (Romania) Ilie Năstase

Women's singles
- (United Kingdom) Virginia Wade

Men's doubles
- (Spain) Juan Gisbert / (Romania) Ilie Năstase

Women's doubles
- (United States) Julie Heldman / (United Kingdom) Virginia Wade
- British Hard Court Championships

The 1974 British Hard Court Championships, also known by its sponsored name Rothmans British Hard Court Championships, was a combined men's and women's tennis tournament played on outdoor clay courts at The West Hants Club in Bournemouth, England. The men's event was part of the Grand Prix circuit and categorized as B class. The tournament was held from 20 May through 26 May 1974. Ilie Năstase and Virginia Wade won the singles titles.

== Finals ==
=== Men's singles ===
(Romania) Ilie Năstase defeated (Italy) Paolo Bertolucci 6–1, 6–3, 6–2

=== Women's singles ===
(United Kingdom) Virginia Wade defeated (United States) Julie Heldman 6–1, 3–6, 6–1

=== Men's doubles ===
(Spain) Juan Gisbert / (Romania) Ilie Năstase defeated (Italy) Corrado Barazzutti / (Italy) Paolo Bertolucci 6–4, 6–2, 6–0

=== Women's doubles ===
(United States) Julie Heldman / (United Kingdom) Virginia Wade defeated (United States) Patti Hogan / (United States) Sharon Walsh 6–2, 6–2
