= Janet Newberry =

American tennis player

- Full name: Janet Newberry-Howe
- Country (sports): United States
- Residence: St Petersburg, Florida
- Born: August 6, 1953 (age 73) Los Angeles, California
- Height: 5 ft 7 in (1.70 m)
- Turned pro: 1971
- Retired: 1985 (doubles) 1980 (singles)
- Plays: Right-handed

Singles
- Career titles: 2
- Highest ranking: No. 17

Grand Slam singles results
- Australian Open: QF (1974, 1979)
- French Open: SF (1975, 1977)
- Wimbledon: 3R (1973, 1975, 1978)
- US Open: 4R (1976)

Doubles
- Career titles: 6

Grand Slam doubles results
- Australian Open: 2R (1974)
- French Open: 2R (1975, 1977)
- Wimbledon: QF (1984)
- US Open: 2R (1973, 1974)

Grand Slam mixed doubles results
- Wimbledon: F (1973)
- US Open: QF (1971, 1973)

Janet Newberry (born August 6, 1953) is an American former professional tennis player who was active in the 1970s. She is also known by her former married name Janet Newberry-Wright and Janet Wright. She reached the semifinals of the French Open in 1975 and 1977 and the final of the 1973 Wimbledon Championships mixed doubles.

== Personal life ==
Janet Newberry is a stepdaughter of lawyer Edward A. Turville, a former Davis Cup Captain, President of the USTA and a founder of the Florida Lawn Tennis Association in 1949 who served as its first president for five years. Janet married Frank I. Wright, a horse trainer at Belmont Park, television horse racing commentator for CBS and ESPN and World War II veteran, in 1981 and went by the name Janet Newberry-Wright. After Wright's death in 1991, she married Ralph Howe, the national grass court 60 & over singles champion, court tennis champion, Yale intercollegiate squash champion, North American singles squash champion, in 1997 and now is known as Janet Newberry-Howe.

== Career ==
In 1968, Newberry won the USLTA 16-and-under championship.

In 1974, she played for the Boston Lobsters of the World Team Tennis league. In 1975, she won the British Hardcourt Championship in Bournemouth, reached the semifinals of the French Open, and played for the United States Federation Cup team in doubles, partnering Julie Heldman.

In 1976, Newberry beat Martina Navratilova in the first round of the US Open in three sets. Navratilova said, "I still consider that loss the worst of my career, at least in the way I responded to it on and off the court." Newberry was reported as saying that she had never seen anyone so distraught, and she helped Navratilova calm down afterwards.

In 1977, Newberry won the Italian Open after defeating Renáta Tomanová in the final in straight sets, and reached the semifinals of the French Open.

In 1984, Newberry achieved her best Grand Slam women's doubles result, reaching the quarterfinals at Wimbledon partnering Renee Blount, losing to Kathy Jordan and Anne Smith in straight sets.

Newberry's highest world ranking in singles was world No. 17.

== Later ==
Newberry was manager of British women's national training. She later worked for the Women's Tennis Association.

In 2004, she opened an antique shop in St Petersburg, Florida based on her collection of tennis memorabilia.

== WTA Tour finals ==
=== Singles (2 titles, 3 runners-up) ===
Legend
Grand Slam	0
WTA Championships	0
Tier I	0
Tier II	0
Tier III	0
Tier IV & V	0

Result	W/L	Date	Tournament	Surface	Opponent	Score
Loss	0–1	Mar 1973	Virginia Slims of Richmond, US	Clay (i)	(Australia) Margaret Court	2–6, 1–6
Loss	0–2	Jun 1973	Kent Championships, UK	Grass	(Australia) Dianne Fromholtz	5–6, 6–0, 1–6
Win	1–2	May 1975	British Hard Court Championships, UK	Clay	(United States) Terry Holladay	7–9, 7–5, 6–3
Win	2–2	May 1977	Italian Open, Italy	Clay	(Czechoslovakia) Renáta Tomanová	6–3, 7–6^{(7–5)}
Loss	2–3	Oct 1977	Borinquen Classic, Puerto Rico	Hard	(United States) Billie Jean King	1–6, 3–6

=== Doubles 4 (3–1) ===
Legend
Grand Slam	0
WTA Championships	0
Tier I	0
Tier II	0
Tier III	0
Tier IV & V	0

Titles by surface
Hard	0
Clay	0
Grass	1
Carpet	1

Result	W/L	Date	Tournament	Surface	Partner	Opponents	Score
Win	1–0	Mar 1973	Tucson, US	Hard	(United States) Pam Teeguarden	(Australia) Karen Krantzcke (Netherlands) Betty Stöve	3–6, 7–6, 7–5
Loss	1–1	Feb 1977	Detroit, US	Carpet	(United States) JoAnne Russell	(United States) Martina Navratilova (Netherlands) Betty Stöve	6–4, 2–6, 4–6
Win	2–1	Jun 1978	Chichester, UK	Grass	(United States) Pam Shriver	(United Kingdom) Michelle Tyler (South Africa) Yvonne Vermaak	3–6, 6–3, 6–4
Win	3–1	Jan 1979	Houston, US	Carpet	(United States) Martina Navratilova	(United States) Pam Shriver (Netherlands) Betty Stöve	4–6, 6–4, 6–2

=== Mixed doubles 1 ===
Legend
Grand Slam	0
WTA Championships	0
Tier I	0
Tier II	0
Tier III	0
Tier IV & V	0

Titles by surface
Hard	0
Clay	0
Grass	0
Carpet	0

Result	No.	Date	Tournament	Surface	Partner	Opponents	Score
Loss	1.	Jul 1973	Wimbledon, UK	Grass	(Mexico) Raúl Ramírez	(Australia) Owen Davidson (United States) Billie Jean King	3–6, 2–6
