= 1976 British Hard Court Championships =

Tennis tournament

- Date: 10–16 May
- Edition: 47th
- Category: Grand Prix
- Draw: 64S/32D
- Prize money: $75,000
- Surface: Clay / outdoor
- Location: Bournemouth, England

Champions

Men's singles
- (Poland) Wojciech Fibak

Women's singles
- (West Germany) Helga Masthoff

Men's doubles
- (Poland) Wojciech Fibak / (United States) Fred McNair

Women's doubles
- (South Africa) Linky Boshoff / (South Africa) Ilana Kloss

Mixed doubles
- (South Africa) Linky Boshoff / (United Kingdom) Colin Dowdeswell
- British Hard Court Championships

The 1976 British Hard Court Championships, also known by its sponsored name Coca-Cola British Hard Court Championships, was a combined men's and women's tennis tournament played on outdoor clay courts in Bournemouth, England. The men's event was part of the 1976 Commercial Union Assurance Grand Prix. The tournament was held from 10 May through 16 May 1976. Wojciech Fibak and Helga Masthoff won the singles titles.

== Finals ==
=== Men's singles ===
(Poland) Wojciech Fibak defeated (Spain) Manuel Orantes 6–2, 7–9, 6–2, 6–2

=== Women's singles ===
(West Germany) Helga Masthoff defeated (United Kingdom) Sue Barker 5–7, 6–3, 6–3

=== Men's doubles ===
(Poland) Wojciech Fibak / (United States) Fred McNair defeated (Spain) Juan Gisbert, Sr. / (Spain) Manuel Orantes 4–6, 7–5, 7–5

=== Women's doubles ===
(South Africa) Linky Boshoff / (South Africa) Ilana Kloss defeated (United Kingdom) Lesley Charles / (United Kingdom) Sue Mappin 6–3, 6–2

=== Mixed doubles ===
(South Africa) Linky Boshoff / (United Kingdom) Colin Dowdeswell defeated (South Africa) Ilana Kloss / (South Africa) Byron Bertram 6–8, 8–6, 6–1
