= Alexia Dechaume-Balleret =

French tennis player (born 1970)

- Country (sports): France
- Born: 3 May 1970 (age 56)
- Retired: 2000
- Plays: Right-handed
- Prize money: US$949,605

Singles
- Career record: 234–229
- Career titles: 0
- Highest ranking: No. 46 (17 August 1992)

Grand Slam singles results
- Australian Open: 3R (1991, 1992)
- French Open: 4R (1994)
- Wimbledon: 3R (1990)
- US Open: 3R (1994)

Doubles
- Career record: 165–173
- Career titles: 6
- Highest ranking: No. 22 (22 March 1993)

Grand Slam doubles results
- Australian Open: 3R (1989)
- French Open: 2R (1990, 91, 92, 1994, 95, 96, 1998)
- Wimbledon: 3R (1988, 1996)
- US Open: 3R (1996)

Alexia Dechaume-Balleret (born 3 May 1970) is a former professional tennis player from France.

== Career ==
In her career, she reached three finals on the WTA Tour: at Taranto in 1990, she lost to Raffaella Reggi, and in New York in 1991, she lost to Brenda Schultz-McCarthy at Schenectady, both Tier V tournaments. At the Tier IV event in Cardiff in 1997, she lost to Virginia Ruano Pascual in the final, in three sets.

Her best Grand Slam performance was the fourth round at the 1994 French Open. As a wildcard entrant and the world No. 197, she beat Emanuela Zardo, Wiltrud Probst and Marzia Grossi, then lost to third seed Conchita Martínez, 1–6, 2–6.

She achieved more notable success in doubles, winning six titles, four with Florencia Labat, and ranking as high as No. 22 in the WTA rankings. On 17 August 1992, she reached her career-high singles ranking of world No. 46.

She retired after a first-round defeat at the hands of Emmanuelle Gagliardi, at the 2000 Australian Open.

On 16 December 2008, Alexia Dechaume was named coach of the French Fed Cup team by the French Tennis Federation.

== Personal life ==
Dechaume-Balleret is married to Bernard Balleret. Her stepson is Benjamin Balleret.

== WTA career finals ==
=== Singles: 3 (3 runner-ups) ===
Legend
Grand Slam
Tier I
Tier II
Tier III
Tier IV & V

| Result | W–L | Date | Tournament | Surface | Opponent | Score |
|---|---|---|---|---|---|---|
| Loss | 0–1 | May 1990 | Ilva Trophy, Italy | Clay | (Italy) Raffaella Reggi | 6–3, 0–6, 2–6 |
| Loss | 0–2 | Aug 1991 | Schenectady Open, U.S. | Hard | (Netherlands) Brenda Schultz | 6–7^{(5–7)}, 2–6 |
| Loss | 0–3 | May 1997 | Welsh International Open, UK | Clay | (Spain) Virginia Ruano Pascual | 1–6, 6–3, 2–6 |

=== Doubles: 11 (6 titles, 5 runner-ups) ===
Legend
| Grand Slam | 0 |
| Tier I | 0 |
| Tier II | 0 |
| Tier III | 1 |
| Tier IV & V | 5 |

Finals by surface
| Hard | 2 |
| Clay | 4 |
| Grass | 0 |
| Carpet | 0 |

| Result | W–L | Date | Tournament | Surface | Partner | Opponents | Score |
|---|---|---|---|---|---|---|---|
| Win | 1–0 | Sep 1988 | Clarins Open, France | Clay | (France) Emmanuelle Derly | (Australia) Louise Field (France) Nathalie Herreman | 6–0, 6–2 |
| Loss | 1–1 | Sep 1990 | Clarins Open, France | Clay | (France) Nathalie Herreman | (Australia) Kristin Godridge (Australia) Kirrily Sharpe | 6–4, 3–6, 1–6 |
| Win | 2–1 | May 1991 | Ilva Trophy, Italy | Clay | (Argentina) Florencia Labat | (Italy) Laura Golarsa (United States) Ann Grossman | 6–2, 7–5 |
| Loss | 2–2 | Sep 1991 | Clarins Open, France | Clay | (France) Julie Halard | (Czechoslovakia) Petra Langrová (Czechoslovakia) Radomira Zrubáková | 4–6, 4–6 |
| Win | 3–2 | Jul 1992 | Gastein Ladies, Austria | Clay | (Argentina) Florencia Labat | (South Africa) Amanda Coetzer (Germany) Wiltrud Probst | 6–3, 6–3 |
| Win | 4–2 | Jul 1992 | San Marino Open | Clay | (Argentina) Florencia Labat | (Italy) Sandra Cecchini (Italy) Laura Garrone | 7–6^{(8–6)}, 7–5 |
| Win | 5–2 | Aug 1992 | Schenectady Open, U.S. | Hard | (Argentina) Florencia Labat | (United States) Ginger Helgeson (United States) Shannan McCarthy | 6–3, 1–6, 6–2 |
| Loss | 5–3 | Aug 1995 | San Diego Open, U.S. | Hard | (France) Sandrine Testud | (United States) Gigi Fernández (Belarus) Natalia Zvereva | 2–6, 1–6 |
| Loss | 5–4 | May 1996 | Bol Ladies Open, Croatia | Clay | (France) Alexandra Fusai | (Argentina) Laura Montalvo (Argentina) Paola Suárez | 7–6, 3–6, 4–6 |
| Win | 6–4 | Apr 1997 | Tokyo Championships, Japan | Hard | (Japan) Rika Hiraki | (Australia) Kerry-Anne Guse (United States) Corina Morariu | 6–4, 6–2 |
| Loss | 6–5 | Jan 1999 | Hobart International, Australia | Hard | (France) Émilie Loit | (South Africa) Mariaan de Swardt (Ukraine) Elena Tatarkova | 1–6, 2–6 |

== ITF Circuit finals ==
$100,000 tournaments
$75,000 tournaments
$50,000 tournaments
$25,000 tournaments
$10,000 tournaments

=== Singles: 2 (1–1) ===
| Result | No. | Date | Tournament | Surface | Opponent | Score |
|---|---|---|---|---|---|---|
| Win | 1. | 21 March 1988 | ITF Bayonne, France | Hard | (France) Nathalie Guerrée-Spitzer | 6–3, 3–6, 7–5 |
| Loss | 1. | 17 May 1998 | ITF Porto, Portugal | Clay | (Israel) Anna Smashnova | 2–6, 2–6 |

=== Doubles: 1 (1–0) ===
| Result | No. | Date | Tournament | Surface | Partner | Opponents | Score |
|---|---|---|---|---|---|---|---|
| Win | 1. | 26 February 1990 | ITF Wels, Austria | Clay | (France) Pascale Paradis | (Czechoslovakia) Hana Fukárková (Czechoslovakia) Denisa Krajčovičová | 6–3, 6–2 |

== Head-to-head records against other players in the top 10 ==
- Lindsay Davenport 0–1
- Dominique Monami 0–1
- Arantxa Sánchez Vicario 0–1
- Serena Williams 1–0
- Anna Kournikova 0–2
- Karina Habšudová 1–0
- Steffi Graf 0–2
- Amélie Mauresmo 1–1
- Martina Navratilova 0–3
- Jana Novotná 0–3
- Iva Majoli 0–1
- Venus Williams 0–2
