= 1996 Rover British Clay Court Championships =

- Date: 14–19 May
- Edition: 2nd
- Category: Tier IV
- Draw: 32S / 16D
- Prize money: $107,500
- Surface: Clay / outdoor
- Location: Cardiff, Wales

Champions

Singles
- (Belgium) Dominique Van Roost

Doubles
- (United States) Katrina Adams / (South Africa) Mariaan de Swardt
← 1995 ·	British Hard Court Championships

The 1996 Rover British Clay Court Championships was a women's tennis tournament played on outdoor clay courts in Cardiff in Wales that was part of the Tier IV category of the 1996 WTA Tour. It was the second edition of the tournament and was held from 14 May until 19 May 1996. Fifth-seeded Dominique Van Roost won the singles title.

== Finals ==
=== Singles ===
(Belgium) Dominique Van Roost defeated (Belgium) Laurence Courtois 6–4, 6–2

- It was Van Roost's only singles title of the year and the 1st of her career.

=== Doubles ===
(United States) Katrina Adams / (South Africa) Mariaan de Swardt defeated (Belgium) Els Callens / (Belgium) Laurence Courtois 6–0, 6–4

- It was Adams' 2nd and last doubles title of the year and the 19th of her career. It was de Swardt's only doubles title of the year and the 2nd of her career.
