= British Hard Court Championships =

Defunct tennis tournament
- Event name: British Hard Court Championships (1968–70, 1978, 1980–83); Rothmans British Hard Court Championships (1971–74); Coca-Cola British Hard Court Championships (1975–76); Men: Bournemouth International/Samsung Open (1996–99); Women: Rover British Clay Court Championships (1995–96)
- Tour: ILTF (1968–70); Grand Prix circuit (1970–76, 1978, 1980–83); ATP World Series (1996–99); WTA Tour (1968, 1971–76, 1995–96)
- Founded: 1924
- Abolished: 1999
- Location: Torquay (1924–26); Bournemouth (1927–83, 1995–99); Cardiff (1996, women)
- Surface: Clay

The British Hard Court Championships was a Grand Prix tennis and WTA Tour affiliated tennis tournament, played in the Open Era from 1968 to 1983 and again (albeit not named as such) from 1995 to 1999.

== History ==
As an amateur tournament, the inaugural edition was held in 1924 in Torquay, moving to the West Hants Tennis Club in Bournemouth, England in 1927. The tournament remained there until 1983, although the 1977 and 1979 editions were cancelled due to lack of sponsorship.

At that time, the tournament was played outdoors on red shale, (Note: In Britain, shale courts were usually referred to as 'hard' in order to distinguish them from grass, which was termed a 'soft' surface.) which is similar to European clay but with a grittier, looser surface, thus leading to faster play. When the tournament became a fixture of the Open Era in 1968 (see below), many professional competitors from overseas, unused to the playing conditions, complained that the shale courts were wet and slippery. By the mid-1970s, however, the event had become a destination for several top European and South American clay courters: winners of the men's singles championship during those years include Ilie Năstase, Adriano Panatta, Manuel Orantes, Victor Pecci and José Higueras. This did not prevent it from being cancelled indefinitely in 1984, which the organisers explained was due to the lack of a sponsor and the withdrawal of television coverage.

In 1995, the event was revived at Bournemouth as a women's WTA tournament but was only played there that one time; the final edition the following year was held in Cardiff, Wales. A men's ATP World Series tournament was then staged at the West Hants Club on American green clay from 1996 to 1999, before being relocated to indoor hard courts in Brighton for the 2000 edition (see Brighton International).

Bournemouth was once one of the world's major tournaments, second only to Wimbledon in England and on the same level as Monte Carlo, Rome and Hamburg. In the pre-war era, it was regarded as the most important event outside the four Grand Slams. Fred Perry is the record holder with five consecutive titles, from 1932 through to 1936.

== Start of Open Era ==
The Championships hold the distinction of being the first tennis tournament to be held in the Open Era, taking place in April 1968. It started on 22 April at 1:43 p.m. when John Clifton served and won the first point. Ken Rosewall won the men's singles title, taking home $2,400, while runner-up Rod Laver received $1,200. Virginia Wade won the women's singles title, defeating Winnie Shaw in the final, but did not take home the winner's prize of $720 as she was still an amateur at the time of the tournament. She thus became the first amateur to win a title in the Open Era. Christine Janes and her sister Nell Truman became the first winners of an open tennis event by winning the women's doubles title.

The tournament was considered a success and attracted almost 30,000 visitors. The young British player Mark Cox went down in tennis history, when at the second round of the championships he became the first amateur player to beat a professional, after defeating the American Pancho Gonzales in five sets in two and a quarter hours.

== Results ==
=== Men's singles ===
Year	Champion	Runner-up	Score
1924	(Australia) Randolph Lycett	(Netherlands) Christiaan van Lennep	6–1, 3–6, 6–4, 6–3
1925	(South Africa) Patrick Spence	(United Kingdom) Charles Kingsley	6–1, 6–4, 9–7
1926	(France) Jacques Brugnon	(United Kingdom) Bunny Austin	7–5, 4–6, 3–6, 8–6, 6–3
1927	(France) René Lacoste	(South Africa) Patrick Spence	6–1, 6–2, 6–2
1928	(France) René Lacoste	(South Africa) Patrick Spence	6–2, 6–2, 6–2
1929	(United Kingdom) Bunny Austin	(South Africa) Louis Raymond	6–3, 6–2, 1–6, 6–4
1930	(United Kingdom) Harry Lee	(United Kingdom) Eric Peters	6–3, 2–6, 6–4, 6–4
1931	(France) Christian Boussus	(United Kingdom) Pat Hughes	8–6, 6–4, 4–6, 6–2
1932	(United Kingdom) Fred Perry	(Republic of Ireland) George Lyttleton Rogers	4–6, 7–9, 6–3, 6–0, 6–2
1933	(United Kingdom) Fred Perry	(United Kingdom) Bunny Austin	2–6, 7–5, 7–5, 6–2
1934	(United Kingdom) Fred Perry	(Australia) Jack Crawford	8–6, 7–5, 6–1
1935	(United Kingdom) Fred Perry	(United Kingdom) Bunny Austin	0–6, 6–4, 3–6, 6–2, 6–0
1936	(United Kingdom) Fred Perry	(United Kingdom) Bunny Austin	6–2, 8–6, 6–3
1937	(United Kingdom) Bunny Austin	(United Kingdom) Harry Lee	6–2, 6–2, 6–0
1938	(Taiwan) Kho Sin-Kie	(United Kingdom) Bunny Austin	6–4, 6–4, 3–6, 6–3
1939	(Taiwan) Kho Sin-Kie	(Taiwan) Choy Wai-Chuen	7–5, 6–1, 6–4
1940–1945	Not held (WW2)		
1946	(Australia) Jack E. Harper	(United Kingdom) Derrick W. Barton	7–5, 6–2, 6–1
1947	(South Africa) Eric Sturgess	(Poland) Ignacy Tłoczyński	11–9, 6–1, 6–4
1948	(South Africa) Eric Sturgess	(Poland) Ignacy Tłoczyński	6–2, 6–3, 6–1
1949	(Spain) Pedro Masip	(France) Henri Cochet	6–3, 4–6, 6–2, 9–7
1950	(Egypt) Jaroslav Drobný	(Australia) Geoff Brown	7–5, 6–0, 6–4
1951	(Egypt) Jaroslav Drobný	(Philippines) Felicisimo Ampon	6–4, 6–2, 6–0
1952	(Egypt) Jaroslav Drobný	(Australia) Frank Sedgman	6–2, 6–4, 1–6, 6–4
1953	(Argentina) Enrique Morea	(Philippines) Felicisimo Ampon	6–3, 6–2, 6–1
1954	(United Kingdom) Tony Mottram	(United Kingdom) Geoffrey Paish	6–4, 6–3, 7–5
1955	(Sweden) Sven Davidson	(United Kingdom) Roger Becker	11–9, 6–3, 6–1
1956	(United States) Budge Patty	(United States) Ham Richardson	1–6, 6–3, 6–3, 6–3
1957	(Egypt) Jaroslav Drobný	(Australia) Lew Hoad	6–4, 6–4, 6–4
1958	(United Kingdom) William Knight	(Italy) Giuseppe Merlo	5–7, 6–0, 6–2, 6–3
1959	(New Zealand) Lew Gerrard	(United Kingdom) William Knight	3–6, 2–6, 6–2, 7–5, 9–7
1960	(United Kingdom) Mike Davies	(United Kingdom) William Knight	6–2, 4–6, 6–2, 6–1
1961	(Australia) Roy Emerson	(Australia) Rod Laver	8–6, 6–4, 6–0
1962	(Australia) Rod Laver	(New Zealand) Ian Crookenden	6–3, 6–3, 6–3
1963	(United Kingdom) William Knight	(Australia) Martin Mulligan	5–7, 6–3, 6–1, 6–3
1964	(United Kingdom) William Knight	(South Africa) Cliff Drysdale	6–3, 1–6, 6–1, 5–7, 7–5
1965	(Sweden) Jan-Erik Lundqvist	(South Africa) Cliff Drysdale	3–6, 6–4, 8–6, 6–1
1966	(Australia) Ken Fletcher	(Netherlands) Tom Okker	7–5, 6–4
1967	(Sweden) Jan-Erik Lundqvist	(Australia) Bob Hewitt	6–1, 6–8, 6–3, 6–2
↓ Open era ↓
1968	(Australia) Ken Rosewall	(Australia) Rod Laver	3–6, 6–2, 6–0, 6–3
1969	(Australia) John Newcombe	(South Africa) Bob Hewitt	6–8, 6–3, 5–7, 6–4, 6–4
1970	(United Kingdom) Mark Cox	(South Africa) Bob Hewitt	6–1, 6–2, 6–3
1971	(United Kingdom) Gerald Battrick	(Socialist Federal Republic of Yugoslavia) Željko Franulović	6–3, 6–2, 5–7, 6–0
1972	(South Africa) Bob Hewitt	(France) Pierre Barthès	6–2, 6–4, 6–3
1973	(Italy) Adriano Panatta	(Romania) Ilie Năstase	6–8, 7–5, 6–3
1974	(Romania) Ilie Năstase	(Italy) Paolo Bertolucci	6–1, 6–3, 6–2
1975	(Spain) Manuel Orantes	(France) Patrick Proisy	6–3, 4–6, 6–2, 7–5
1976	(Poland) Wojciech Fibak	(Spain) Manuel Orantes	6–2, 7–9, 6–2, 6–2
1977	Not held		
1978	(Spain) José Higueras	(Italy) Paolo Bertolucci	6–2, 6–1, 6–3
1979	Not held		
1980	(Spain) Ángel Giménez	(Israel) Shlomo Glickstein	3–6, 6–3, 6–3
1981	(Paraguay) Víctor Pecci	(Hungary) Balázs Taróczy	6–3, 6–4
1982	(Spain) Manuel Orantes	(Spain) Ángel Giménez	6–2, 6–0
1983	(Spain) José Higueras	(Czechoslovakia) Tomáš Šmíd	2–6, 7–6, 7–5
1984–1995	Not held		
1996	(Spain) Albert Costa	(Germany) Marc-Kevin Goellner	6–7, 6–2, 6–2
1997	(Spain) Félix Mantilla	(Spain) Carlos Moyá	6–2, 6–2
1998	(Spain) Félix Mantilla	(Spain) Albert Costa	6–3, 7–5
1999	(Romania) Adrian Voinea	(Austria) Stefan Koubek	1–6, 7–5, 7–6

=== Women's singles ===
Year	Champion	Runner-up	Score
1924	(United States) Elizabeth Ryan	(United Kingdom) Geraldine Beamish	6–2, 6–2
1925	(United States) Elizabeth Ryan	(United Kingdom) Joan Fry	6–2, 6–2
1926	(United Kingdom) Joan Fry	(United Kingdom) Phoebe Holcroft Watson	6–1, 7–9, 6–1
1927	(United Kingdom) Betty Nuthall	(United Kingdom) Edith Clarke	8–6, 6–2
1928	(United Kingdom) Elsie Goldsack	(United Kingdom) Joan Ridley	8–6, 6–3
1929	(South Africa) Bobby Heine	(United Kingdom) Joan Ridley	6–4, 3–6, 8–6
1930	(United Kingdom) Joan Fry	(United Kingdom) Madge List	6–1, 2–6, 6–2
1931	(France) Simonne Mathieu	(United Kingdom) Mary Heeley	6–4, 6–4
1932	(France) Simonne Mathieu	(United Kingdom) Dorothy Round	6–1, 6–2
1933	(United Kingdom) Dorothy Round	(United States) Helen Jacobs	3–6, 6–2, 6–3
1934	(United Kingdom) Dorothy Round	(United Kingdom) Peggy Scriven	6–2, 2–6, 8–6
1935	(United Kingdom) Kay Stammers	(United Kingdom) Peggy Scriven	6–2, 6–2
1936	(United Kingdom) Kay Stammers	(Chile) Anita Lizana	7–5, 7–5
1937	(Chile) Anita Lizana	(United Kingdom) Peggy Scriven	7–5, 6–3
1938	(United Kingdom) Peggy Scriven	(Australia) Nancye Wynne	7–5, 6–2
1939	(United Kingdom) Kay Stammers	(Chile) Anita Ellis	6–3, 6–3
1940–1945	Not held		
1946	(United Kingdom) Jean Bostock	(United Kingdom) Kay Menzies	6–3, 6–4
1947	(Australia) Nancye Bolton	(United Kingdom) Joan Curry	7–5, 6–3
1948	(United Kingdom) Betty Hilton	(United Kingdom) Pamela Bocquet	6–1, 6–4
1949	(United Kingdom) Joan Curry	(United Kingdom) Jean Quertier	3–6, 7–5, 7–5
1950	(United Kingdom) Joan Curry	(Argentina) Mary Terán de Weiss	8–6, 8–6
1951	(United States) Doris Hart	(United Kingdom) Jean Walker-Smith	6–4, 8–6
1952	(United States) Doris Hart	(United States) Shirley Fry	6–4, 6–3
1953	(United States) Doris Hart	(United States) Shirley Fry	6–3, 4–6, 6–4
1954	(United States) Doris Hart	(United Kingdom) Joy Mottram	6–1, 6–3
1955	(United Kingdom) Angela Mortimer	(United Kingdom) Angela Buxton	6–1, 6–1
1956	(United Kingdom) Angela Mortimer	(United Kingdom) Shirley Bloomer	7–5, 5–7, 6–1
1957	(United Kingdom) Shirley Bloomer	(United Kingdom) Patricia Ward	3–6, 6–3, 6–2
1958	(United Kingdom) Shirley Bloomer	(United Kingdom) Ann Haydon	6–4, 6–4
1959	(United Kingdom) Angela Mortimer	(United Kingdom) Christine Truman	6–4, 2–6, 6–4
1960	(United Kingdom) Christine Truman	(United Kingdom) Ann Haydon	6–2, 6–2
1961	(United Kingdom) Angela Mortimer	(United Kingdom) Deidre Catt	6–2, 6–3
1962	(South Africa) Renée Schuurman	(United Kingdom) Angela Mortimer	5–7, 6–2, 6–4
1963	(United Kingdom) Ann Haydon-Jones	(Argentina) Norma Baylon	6–0, 1–6, 9–7
1964	(United Kingdom) Ann Haydon-Jones	(Australia) Jan Lehane	6–2, 12–10
1965	(United Kingdom) Ann Haydon-Jones	(South Africa) Annette Van Zyl	7–5, 6–1
1966	(United Kingdom) Ann Haydon-Jones	(United Kingdom) Virginia Wade	6–3, 6–1
1967	(United Kingdom) Virginia Wade	(United Kingdom) Ann Haydon-Jones	6–1, 10–8
↓ Open era ↓
1968	(United Kingdom) Virginia Wade	(United Kingdom) Winnie Shaw	6–4, 6–1
1969	(Australia) Margaret Court	(United Kingdom) Winnie Shaw	5–7, 6–4, 6–4
1970	(Australia) Margaret Court	(United Kingdom) Virginia Wade	6–2, 6–3
1971	(Australia) Margaret Court	(Australia) Evonne Goolagong	7–5, 6–1
1972	(Australia) Evonne Goolagong	(West Germany) Helga Niessen Masthoff	6–0, 6–4
1973	(United Kingdom) Virginia Wade	(Australia) Evonne Goolagong	6–4, 6–4
1974	(United Kingdom) Virginia Wade	(United States) Julie Heldman	6–1, 3–6, 6–1
1975	(United States) Janet Newberry	(United States) Terry Holladay	7–9, 7–5, 6–3
1976	(West Germany) Helga Masthoff	(United Kingdom) Sue Barker	5–7, 6–3, 6–3
1977–1994	Not held		
1995	(Czech Republic) Ludmila Richterová	(Canada) Patricia Hy-Boulais	6–7, 6–4, 6–3
1996	(Belgium) Dominique Van Roost	(Belgium) Laurence Courtois	6–4, 6–2

=== Men's doubles ===
Year	Champion	Runner-up	Score
1968	(Australia) Roy Emerson (Australia) Rod Laver	(Spain) Andrés Gimeno (United States) Pancho Gonzales	8–6, 4–6, 6–3, 6–2
1969	(South Africa) Bob Hewitt (South Africa) Frew McMillan	(France) Jean-Claude Barclay (United Kingdom) Bobby Wilson	6–4, 6–2, 2–6, 9–7
1970	(Netherlands) Tom Okker (Australia) Tony Roche	(Australia) William Bowrey (Australia) Owen Davidson	2–6, 6–4, 6–4, 6–4
1971	(Australia) William Bowrey (Australia) Owen Davidson	(Chile) Patricio Cornejo (Chile) Jaime Fillol	8–6, 6–2, 3–6, 4–6, 6–3
1972	(South Africa) Bob Hewitt (South Africa) Frew McMillan	(Romania) Ilie Năstase (Romania) Ion Țiriac	7–5, 6–2
1973	(Spain) Juan Gisbert Sr. (Romania) Ilie Năstase	(Italy) Adriano Panatta (Romania) Ion Țiriac	6–4, 8–6
1974	(Spain) Juan Gisbert Sr. (Romania) Ilie Năstase	(Italy) Corrado Barazzutti (Italy) Paolo Bertolucci	6–4, 6–2, 6–0
1975	(Spain) Juan Gisbert Sr. (Spain) Manuel Orantes	(Australia) Syd Ball (Australia) Dick Crealy	8–6, 6–3
1976	(Poland) Wojciech Fibak (United States) Fred McNair	(Spain) Juan Gisbert Sr. (Spain) Manuel Orantes	4–6, 7–5, 7–5
1977	Not held		
1978	(Netherlands) Louk Sanders (Netherlands) Rolf Thung	(Australia) David Carter (Australia) Rod Frawley	6–3, 6–4
1979	Not held		
1980	(South Africa) Eddie Edwards (United States) Craig Edwards	(United Kingdom) Andrew Jarrett (United Kingdom) Jonathan Smith	6–3, 6–7, 8–6
1981	(Argentina) Ricardo Cano (Paraguay) Víctor Pecci	(United Kingdom) Buster Mottram (Czechoslovakia) Tomáš Šmíd	6–4, 3–6, 6–3
1982	(Australia) Paul McNamee (United Kingdom) Buster Mottram	(France) Henri Leconte (Romania) Ilie Năstase	3–6, 7–6, 6–3
1983	(Czechoslovakia) Tomáš Šmíd (United States) Sherwood Stewart	(Switzerland) Heinz Günthardt (Hungary) Balázs Taróczy	7–6, 7–5

=== Women's doubles ===
Year	Champion	Runner-up	Score
1968	(United Kingdom) Christine Truman Janes (United Kingdom) Nell Truman	(Australia) Fay Toyne-Moore (South Africa) Annette du Plooy	6–4, 6–3
1969	(Australia) Margaret Court (Australia) Judy Tegart	(Netherlands) Ada Bakker (Netherlands) Marijke Schaar	6–1, 6–4
1970	(Australia) Margaret Court (Australia) Judy Tegart	(United States) Rosie Casals (United States) Billie Jean King	6–2, 6–8, 7–5
1971	(United States) Mary-Ann Eisel (France) Françoise Dürr	(Australia) Margaret Court (Australia) Evonne Goolagong	6–3, 5–7, 6–4
1972	(Australia) Evonne Goolagong (Australia) Helen Gourlay	(South Africa) Brenda Kirk (Netherlands) Betty Stöve	7–5, 6–1
1973	(Australia) Patricia Coleman (Australia) Wendy Turnbull	(Australia) Evonne Goolagong (Australia) Janet Young	7–5, 7–5
1974	(United States) Julie Heldman (United Kingdom) Virginia Wade	(United States) Patti Hogan (United States) Sharon Walsh	6–2, 6–2
1975	(United Kingdom) Lesley Charles (United Kingdom) Sue Mappin	(South Africa) Delina Ann Boshoff (South Africa) Greer Stevens	6–3, 6–3
1976	(South Africa) Delina Ann Boshoff (South Africa) Ilana Kloss	(United Kingdom) Lesley Charles (United Kingdom) Sue Mappin	6–3, 6–2
1977–1994	Not held		
1995	(South Africa) Mariaan de Swardt (Romania) Ruxandra Dragomir	(Australia) Kerry-Anne Guse (Canada) Patricia Hy-Boulais	6–3, 7–5
1996	(United States) Katrina Adams (South Africa) Mariaan de Swardt	(Belgium) Els Callens (Belgium) Laurence Courtois	6–0, 6–4

== Records ==
=== Men's singles ===
- Most titles: (United Kingdom) Fred Perry, 5
- Most consecutive titles: (United Kingdom) Fred Perry, 5
- Most finals: (United Kingdom) Bunny Austin, 7
- Most consecutive finals: (United Kingdom) Fred Perry, 5
- Most matches played: (United Kingdom) William Knight, 55
- Most matches won: (United Kingdom) William Knight, 44
- Most consecutive match wins: (United Kingdom) Fred Perry, 25
- Most editions played: (United Kingdom) Tony Pickard, 16
- Best match winning %: (Republic of China (1912–1949)) Kho Sin-Kie 100.00%
- Longest final: (Australia) John Newcombe v (South Africa) Bob Hewitt, result: 6–8, 6–3, 5–7, 6–4, 6–4, 55 games, 1969
- Shortest final: (Spain) Manuel Orantes v (Spain) Ángel Giménez, result: 6–2, 6–0, 14 games, 1982
- Title with the fewest games lost: (Australia) Ken Fletcher, 21, 1966
- Oldest champion: (Australia) Randolph Lycett, 37y 7m and 26d, 1924
- Youngest champion: (New Zealand) Lew Gerrard, 21y 0m and 15d, 1959

Source:The Tennis Base.

== See also ==
- British Covered Court Championships
- Category:National and multi-national tennis tournaments
