= Patricia Hy-Boulais =

Canadian tennis player

- Country (sports): Hong Kong (1986-88); Canada (1988-98)
- Residence: Toronto, Ontario, Canada
- Born: 22 August 1965 (age 61) Phnom Penh, Kingdom of Cambodia
- Height: 1.63 m (5 ft 4 in)
- Turned pro: 12 October 1986
- Retired: 1998
- Plays: Right-handed
- Prize money: $1,011,116
- Official website: patriciahy.com

Singles
- Career record: 151–183
- Career titles: 1 WTA, 4 ITF
- Highest ranking: No. 28 (8 March 1993)

Grand Slam singles results
- Australian Open: 2R (1987, 1991–1993, 1997)
- French Open: 4R (1992)
- Wimbledon: 4R (1996, 1997)
- US Open: QF (1992)

Other tournaments
- Olympic Games: 2R (1992, 1996)

Doubles
- Career record: 13–20
- Career titles: 1 WTA, 5 ITF
- Highest ranking: No. 36 (30 March 1987)

Grand Slam doubles results
- Australian Open: SF (1987)
- French Open: 2R (1985, 1993, 1997, 1998)
- Wimbledon: 2R (1996)
- US Open: QF (1996)

Other doubles tournaments
- Olympic Games: QF (1996)

Grand Slam mixed doubles results
- Australian Open: 1R (1988)
- French Open: 2R (1996)
- Wimbledon: 1R (1985, 1987, 1988, 1989, 1995, 1996, 1997)

Patricia Hy-Boulais (born 22 August 1965) is a former tennis player. She turned professional on 12 October 1986. Early in her career she represented Hong Kong (since the beginning until the end of the 1987 season). She became a citizen of Canada in 1991. However, she represented Canada since the beginning of the 1988 season. Her best performance at a Grand Slam came when she got to the quarter-finals of the 1992 US Open, defeating Eva Švíglerová, Judith Wiesner, Jennifer Capriati and Helena Suková before losing to eventual champion Monica Seles.

After Hy-Boulais did it in 1992, Canada did not have another woman to survive into the second week at the French Open until Aleksandra Wozniak did it in 2009.

Hy-Boulais represented her new country at the 1996 Summer Olympics in Atlanta, Georgia, where she was eliminated in the second round by the number one seed Monica Seles. Hy-Boulais reached her highest ranking in the WTA Tour on 8 March 1993, when she became the number 28 of the world.

Hy-Boulais's daughter Isabelle is a top Canadian tennis prospect.

== Personal life ==
Patricia Hy-Boulais had an athletic family. Her father was a tennis player for Cambodia and served as the team captain. He also has competed in the Davis Cup for Cambodia. Her mother was a national badminton champion for Cambodia.

== WTA finals ==
=== Singles (1 title, 1 runner-up) ===
Legend
Grand Slam Title (0)
WTA Championship (0)
Tier I (0)
Tier II (0)
Tier III (0)
Tier IV (1)
VS (1)

No.	Result	Date	Tournament	Tier	Surface	Opponent	Score
1.	Win	Oct 1986	Taipei, Taiwan	VS	Carpet	(Argentina) Adriana Villagrán-Reami	6–7^{(8–6)}, 6–2, 6–3
2.	Loss	May 1995	Bournemouth, Great Britain	Tier IV	Clay	(Czech Republic) Ludmila Richterová	7–6^{(12–10)}, 4–6, 3–6

=== Doubles (1 title, 2 runner-ups) ===
Legend
Grand Slam Title (0)
WTA Championship (0)
Tier I (0)
Tier II (0)
Tier III (0)
Tier IV (1)
VS (0)

No.	Result	Date	Tournament	Tier	Surface	Partner	Opponents	Score
1.	Loss	Feb 1993	Indian Wells, United States	Tier II	Hard	(United States) Ann Grossman	(Australia) Rennae Stubbs (Czech Republic) Helena Suková	3–6, 4–6
2.	Win	Jan 1994	Auckland, New Zealand	Tier IV	Hard	(Argentina) Mercedes Paz	(Australia) Jenny Byrne (Australia) Julie Richardson	6–4, 7–6^{(7–3)}
3.	Loss	May 1995	Bournemouth, Great Britain	Tier IV	Clay	(Australia) Kerry-Anne Guse	(South Africa) Mariaan De Swardt (Romania) Ruxandra Dragomir	3–6, 5–7

== ITF finals ==
$25,000 tournaments
$10,000 tournaments

=== Singles (4-2) ===
Result	No.	Date	Tournament	Surface	Opponent	Score
Loss	1.	10 January 1983	San Antonio, United States	Hard	(United Kingdom) Amanda Brown	4–6, 6–4, 4–6
Win	2.	17 January 1983	Miami, United States	Hard	(United Kingdom) Kate Brasher	6–3, 6–3
Win	3.	12 November 1984	Telford, United Kingdom	Hard	(United States) Holly Danforth	6–2, 6–4
Win	4.	26 September 1986	Detroit, United States	Hard	(Japan) Nana Smith	6–2, 6–2
Win	5.	25 September 1989	Chicago, United States	Hard	(United States) Linda Wild	6–4, 6–3
Loss	6.	26 February 1990	Key Biscayne, United States	Hard	(United States) Luanne Spadea	1–6, 6–4, 4–6

=== Doubles (5-1) ===
Result	No.	Date	Tournament	Surface	Partner	Opponents	Score
Win	1.	12 November 1984	Peterborough, United Kingdom	Hard	(Netherlands) Marianne van der Torre	(United Kingdom) Glynis Coles-Bond (United Kingdom) Denise Parnell	6–2, 0–6, 6–1
Win	2.	26 November 1984	Darlington, United Kingdom	Hard	(Netherlands) Marianne van der Torre	(United Kingdom) Cathy Drury (United Kingdom) Ellinore Lightbody	6–1, 6–4
Win	3.	4 March 1985	Curitiba, Brazil	Clay	(Netherlands) Karin van Essen	(Czechoslovakia) Lea Plchová (Switzerland) Monica Weber	6–3, 6–4
Loss	4.	8 September 1986	Lisbon, Portugal	Clay	(Mexico) Claudia Hernández	(Spain) María José Llorca (Spain) Ninoska Souto	1–6, 6–4, 4–6
Win	5.	18 September 1986	Murcia, Spain	Clay	(Finland) Anne Aallonen	(Mexico) Lucila Becerra (Mexico) Maluca Llamas	7–6, 6–3
Win	6.	25 September 1988	Chicago, United States	Hard	(United States) Mary Lou Daniels	(United States) Kathy Foxworth (United States) Jane Thomas	6–4, 6–2
