= Welsh International Open =

Defunct tennis tournament
- Event name: Welsh International Open
- Tour: WTA Tour
- Founded: 1997
- Abolished: 1997
- Editions: 1
- Location: Cardiff, Wales
- Surface: Clay / outdoors

The Welsh International Open is a defunct WTA Tour affiliated tennis tournament played in 1997, 12–18 May. It was held in Cardiff in Wales and was played on outdoor clay courts.

== Results ==
=== Singles ===
Year	Champions	Runners-up	Score
1997	(Spain) Virginia Ruano Pascual	(France) Alexia Dechaume-Balleret	6–1, 3–6, 6–2

=== Doubles ===
Year	Champions	Runners-up	Score
1997	(United States) Debbie Graham (Australia) Kerry-Anne Guse	(United Kingdom) Julie Pullin (United Kingdom) Lorna Woodroffe	6–3, 6–4
