= Ludmila Richterová =

Czech tennis player

- Country (sports): Czech Republic
- Born: 7 March 1977 (age 48) Košice, Czechoslovakia
- Turned pro: 1992
- Retired: 2003
- Plays: Right–handed
- Prize money: $316,919

Singles
- Career record: 157–141
- Career titles: 1 WTA, 7 ITF
- Highest ranking: No. 62 (18 March 1996)

Grand Slam singles results
- Australian Open: 3R (1996)
- French Open: 3R (1994)
- Wimbledon: 1R (1994, 1995, 1996, 1997)
- US Open: 2R (1997)

Doubles
- Career record: 74–77
- Career titles: 0 WTA, 4 ITF
- Highest ranking: No. 141 (6 March 2000)

Ludmila Richterová (born 7 March 1977) is a Czech former tennis player. She reached her highest ranking, world No. 62, on 18 March 1996, and won one WTA Tour title, the 1995 Rover British Clay Court Championships in Bournemouth, England, by beating Patricia Hy-Boulais in three sets. In her career, Richterová defeated players such as Barbara Schett, Alexandra Fusai, Chanda Rubin, Conchita Martínez, Anna Smashnova, Ruxandra Dragomir, Anabel Medina Garrigues and Flavia Pennetta.

== WTA career finals ==
=== Singles (1–1) ===
Winner — Legend
Grand Slam tournaments (0–0)
WTA Tour Championships (0–0)
Premier Mandatory & Premier 5 (0–0)
Premier (0–0)
International (1–1)

Result	W/L	Date	Tournament	Surface	Opponent	Score
Loss	0–1	May 1995	Prague, Czech Republic	Clay	(France) Julie Halard	4–6, 4–6
Win	1–1	May 1995	Bournemouth, United Kingdom	Clay	(Canada) Patricia Hy-Boulais	6–7^{(10–12)}, 6–4, 6–3

== ITF finals ==
=== Singles (7-0) ===
$25,000 tournaments
$10,000 tournaments

Result	No.	Date	Tournament	Surface	Opponent	Score
Win	1.	25 April 1993	Nottingham, United Kingdom	Hard	(France) Laurence Bois	6–2, 7–5
Win	2.	2 May 1993	Bath, United Kingdom	Hard	(Germany) Michaela Seibold	6–2, 6–7, 6-3
Win	3.	6 September 1993	Klagenfurt, Austria	Clay	(Czech Republic) Eva Martincová	6–2, 6–2
Win	4.	5 December 1993	Le Havre, France	Clay	(Netherlands) Petra Kamstra	6–7, 6–3, 6–4
Win	5.	6 February 1994	Coburg, Germany	Carpet (i)	(Belgium) Nancy Feber	7–6^{(5)}, 6–2
Win	6.	8 November 1999	Stupava, Slovakia	Hard (i)	(Slovakia) Zuzana Váleková	6–3, 6–1
Win	7.	8 June 2003	Hilton Head, United States	Hard	(South Africa) Nicole Rencken	6–1, 6–0

=== Doubles (4–4) ===
Result	No.	Date	Tournament	Surface	Partner	Opponents	Score
Win	1.	29 November 1993	Le Havre, France	Clay (i)	(Czech Republic) Lenka Němečková	(Greece) Christína Papadáki (United States) Julie Steven	6–1, 7–6^{(2)}
Win	2.	24 October 1994	Poitiers, France	Hard (i)	(Czech Republic) Helena Vildová	(Serbia and Montenegro) Tatjana Ječmenica (Bulgaria) Svetlana Krivencheva	7–6, 6–1
Loss	3.	21 June 1999	Vaihingen, Germany	Clay	(Czech Republic) Radka Pelikánová	(Austria) Patricia Wartusch (Germany) Jasmin Wöhr	1–6, 6–7^{(6)}
Loss	4.	11 July 1999	Darmstadt, Germany	Clay	(Czech Republic) Monika Maštalířová	(Hungary) Petra Mandula (Belarus) Tatiana Poutchek	3–6, 1–6
Win	5.	26 July 1999	Pamplona, Spain	Hard	(Japan) Hiroko Mochizuki	(Tunisia) Selima Sfar (United Kingdom) Joanne Ward	2–6, 6–4, 6–3
Loss	6.	27 February 2000	Buchen, Germany	Carpet (i)	(Germany) Magdalena Kučerová	(Hungary) Adrienn Hegedűs (Netherlands) Maaike Koutstaal	4–6, 2–6
Loss	7.	25 June 2000	Sopot, Poland	Clay	(Germany) Marketa Kochta	(Czech Republic) Milena Nekvapilová (Czech Republic) Hana Šromová	3–6, 2–6
Win	8.	13 April 2003	Mumbai, India	Hard	(Russia) Julia Efremova	(Uzbekistan) Akgul Amanmuradova (Malaysia) Khoo Chin-bee	7–5, 7–5
