= Adriano Panatta =

Italian tennis player (born 1950)

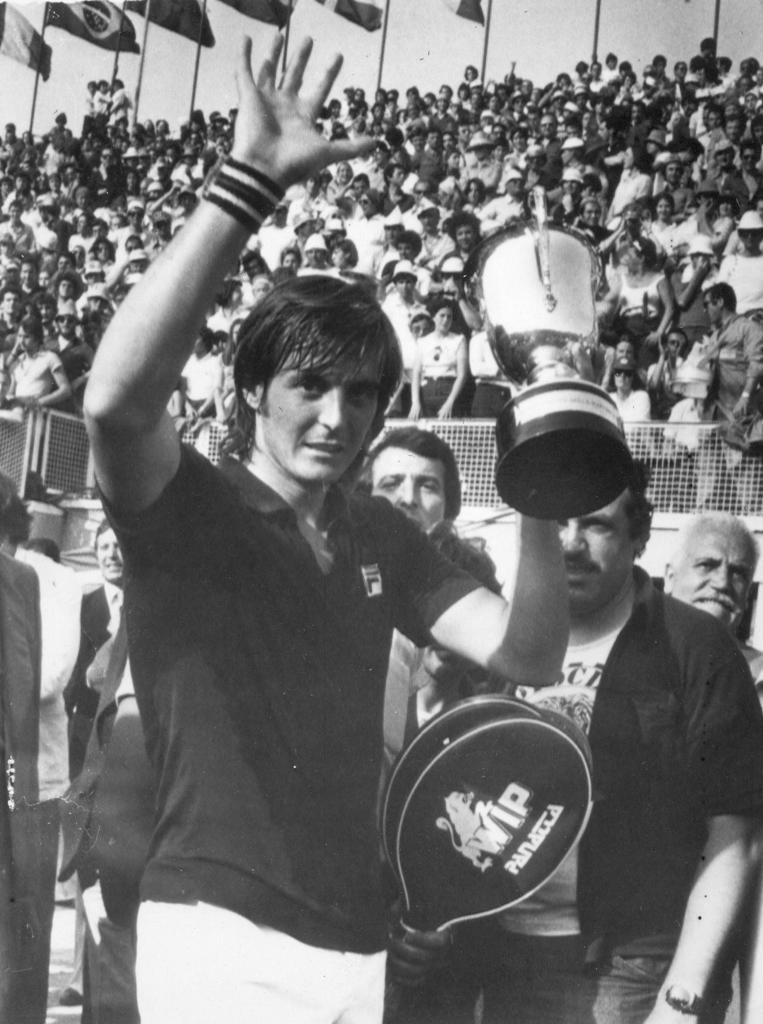
- Adriano Panatta (1976)
- Country (sports): Italy
- Born: 9 July 1950 (age 76) Rome, Italy
- Height: 1.83 m (6 ft 0 in)
- Turned pro: 1969 (amateur from 1968)
- Retired: 1983
- Plays: Right-handed (one-handed backhand)
- Prize money: $776,187

Singles
- Career record: 408–245 (62.5%)
- Career titles: 10
- Highest ranking: No. 4 (24 August 1976)

Grand Slam singles results
- Australian Open: 1R (1969)
- French Open: W (1976)
- Wimbledon: QF (1979)
- US Open: 4R (1978)

Other tournaments
- Tour Finals: RR (1975)
- WCT Finals: QF (1977)

Doubles
- Career record: 233–152 (60.5%)
- Career titles: 18
- Highest ranking: No. 15 (24 March 1980)

Team competitions
- Davis Cup: W (1976)
Medal record
Representing Italy
Mediterranean Games
Bronze medal – third place	1971 İzmir	Doubles

Adriano Panatta (born 9 July 1950) is an Italian former professional tennis player. He won the 1976 French Open, becoming the first Italian man in the Open Era to win a major singles title. That year, Panatta also led Italy to the Davis Cup crown, and he reached his career-high ranking of world No. 4 in men's singles by the Association of Tennis Professionals. Panatta was the only player ever to defeat Björn Borg at the French Open, doing so twice.

From 2018 to 2021, he was a regular guest of the RAI sport broadcast Quelli che... il Calcio.

== Career ==
Panatta was born in Rome. His father was the caretaker of the Tennis Club Parioli, and as a youngster he learned to play the game on the club's clay courts. He became a successful European junior player before turning professional.

In his early career, Panatta won top-level professional titles at Bournemouth in 1973, Florence in 1974, Kitzbühel and Stockholm in 1975.

The pinnacle of his career arrived at the 1976 French Open. In the first round he saved a match point against Czechoslovak player Pavel Hutka. Pannata would meet 2-time defending champion Björn Borg in the quarterfinals, in a rematch of last year’s semifinals which Borg won in 4 sets. This time Pannata was the victor in 4 sets. In the final he beat Harold Solomon in four sets. Panatta relied on "his strong serve and his soccer goalkeeper's reflexes at the net" (he served 10 aces). Pannata would become the only man to beat Borg en route to the French Open title. In the same year he also won the Italian Open, having saved 11 match points in his first round match against the Australian Kim Warwick, and beating Guillermo Vilas in the final in four sets. He finished off 1976 by helping Italy capture its first-ever Davis Cup title, winning two singles and a doubles rubber in the final against Chile. He reached his career-high singles ranking of world No. 4 that year. Panatta remained the highest-ranking Italian tennis player in history until February 2024, when Jannik Sinner became No. 3; Sinner went on to rank No. 1.

Panatta is the only player to have defeated Björn Borg at the French Open, whose win-loss record is 49–2. He achieved this feat twice – in the fourth round in 1973 and the quarterfinals in 1976, the latter en route to the title. Pannata’s win over Borg at the 1976 French Open was his 6th victory over Borg and Pannata lead their head-to-head meetings 6–5, though Borg would win their last 5 encounters, ending their rivalry at Pannata 6-10 Borg.

In 1977, Panatta won the World Championship Tennis in Houston, where he defeated Jimmy Connors and Vitas Gerulaitis. He followed this up with another title in Tokyo in 1978.

Panatta was less successful on fast surfaces, especially on grass. His best performance at Wimbledon was in 1979, when he was beaten in the quarter-finals by Pat DuPré in five sets. In an interview many years later, Panatta remarked that it was the only match in his career he "regretted losing", and that he threw it away by playing a "bit cocky" and repeatedly losing concentration.

After the 1976 Davis Cup triumph, Panatta helped Italy reach the Davis Cup final on three further occasions – in 1977, 1979 and 1980. The team lost to Australia in 1977, the United States in 1979, and to Czechoslovakia in 1980. Overall, Panatta compiled a 64–36 Davis Cup record (55–17 on clay).

His final career singles title came in 1980 at Florence. He retired from the professional tour in 1983.

== Other sport ventures ==
After his retirement, Panatta has served as captain of Italy's Davis Cup team, and as tournament director of the Rome Masters.

Panatta also competed in offshore powerboat racing, most specifically in Class 1 World Powerboat Championship. His most successful season was in 1990, where he and his co-driver Antonio Gioffredi would have been world champion had the title not been revoked after the tragic accident that claimed the life of reigning champion Stefano Casiraghi, husband of Caroline, Princess of Hanover.

From 1992 until 2002, Panatta also competed as a rally driver. In 1992 he took part to a World Rally Championship, the Sanremo Rally, in a Peugeot 309 GTI. Panatta's navigator was Enrico Riccardi. They retired after an accident.

== Private life ==
Panatta is an atheist. His younger brother is fellow tennis player Claudio Panatta.

== Grand Slam finals ==
=== Singles (1 title) ===
Result	Year	Championship	Surface	Opponent	Score
Win	1976	French Open	Clay	(United States) Harold Solomon	6–1, 6–4, 4–6, 7–6

== Career finals ==
=== Singles: 26 (10–16) ===
Result	W/L	Date	Tournament	Surface	Opponent	Score
Win	1–0	Aug 1971	Senigallia, Italy	Clay	(Italy) Martin Mulligan	6–3, 7–5, 6–1
Loss	1–1	Jun 1972	Hamburg, Germany	Clay	(Spain) Manuel Orantes	3–6, 8–9, 0–6
Loss	1–2	Jul 1972	Gstaad, Switzerland	Clay	(Spain) Andrés Gimeno	5–7, 8–9, 4–6
Loss	1–3	Apr 1973	Valencia, Spain	Clay	(Spain) Manuel Orantes	4–6, 4–6, 3–6
Loss	1–4	Apr 1973	Barcelona, Spain	Clay	(Romania) Ilie Năstase	1–6, 6–3, 1–6, 2–6
Loss	1–5	Apr 1973	Nice, France	Clay	(Spain) Manuel Orantes	6–7, 7–5, 6–4, 6–7, 10–12
Loss	1–6	Apr 1973	Madrid, Spain	Clay	(Romania) Ilie Năstase	3–6, 6–7, 7–5, 1–6
Loss	1–7	May 1973	Florence, Italy	Clay	(Romania) Ilie Năstase	3–6, 6–3, 6–0, 6–7, 4–6
Win	2–7	May 1973	Bournemouth, UK	Clay	(Romania) Ilie Năstase	6–8, 7–5, 6–3, 8–6
Win	3–7	May 1974	Florence, Italy	Clay	(Italy) Paolo Bertolucci	6–3, 6–1
Loss	3–8	Jul 1974	Båstad, Sweden	Clay	(Sweden) Björn Borg	3–6, 0–6, 7–6, 3–6
Win	4–8	Jul 1975	Kitzbühel, Austria	Clay	(Czechoslovakia) Jan Kodeš	2–6, 6–2, 7–5, 6–4
Loss	4–9	Oct 1975	Madrid, Spain	Clay	(Czechoslovakia) Jan Kodeš	2–6, 6–3, 6–7, 2–6
Loss	4–10	Oct 1975	Barcelona, Spain	Clay	(Sweden) Björn Borg	6–1, 6–7, 3–6, 2–6
Win	5–10	Nov 1975	Stockholm, Sweden	Hard (i)	(United States) Jimmy Connors	4–6, 6–3, 7–5
Loss	5–11	Nov 1975	Buenos Aires, Argentina	Clay	(Argentina) Guillermo Vilas	6–2, 2–6, 6–4
Win	6–11	May 1976	Rome, Italy	Clay	(Argentina) Guillermo Vilas	2–6, 7–6, 6–2, 7–6
Win	7–11	Jun 1976	French Open, Paris	Clay	(United States) Harold Solomon	6–1, 6–4, 4–6, 7–6
Loss	7–12	Jul 1976	Gstaad, Switzerland	Clay	(Mexico) Raúl Ramírez	5–7, 7–6, 1–6, 3–6
Win	8–12	Apr 1977	Houston WCT, U.S.	Clay	(United States) Vitas Gerulaitis	7–6, 6–7, 6–1
Loss	8–13	May 1978	Rome, Italy	Clay	(Sweden) Björn Borg	6–1, 3–6, 1–6, 6–4, 3–6
Win	9–13	Oct 1978	Tokyo Outdoor, Japan	Clay	(United States) Pat DuPré	6–3, 6–3
Loss	9–14	Nov 1978	Bologna Indoor, Italy	Carpet (i)	(United States) Peter Fleming	2–6, 6–7
Win	10–14	May 1980	Florence, Italy	Clay	(Mexico) Raúl Ramírez	6–2, 2–6, 6–4
Loss	10–15	Sep 1980	Geneva, Switzerland	Clay	(Hungary) Balázs Taróczy	3–6, 2–6
Loss	10–16	Nov 1980	Paris Indoor, France	Hard (i)	(United States) Brian Gottfried	6–4, 3–6, 1–6, 6–7

=== Doubles: 28 (18–10) ===
Result	W/L	Date	Tournament	Surface	Partner	Opponents	Score
Win	1–0	May 1973	Florence. Italy	Clay	(Italy) Paolo Bertolucci	(Spain) Juan Gisbert (Romania) Ilie Năstase	6–3, 6–4
Win	2–0	Mar 1974	São Paulo WCT, Brazil	Carpet (i)	(Romania) Ion Țiriac	(Sweden) Ove Nils Bengtson (Sweden) Björn Borg	7-5, 3-6, 6-3
Win	3–0	May 1974	Florence, Italy	Clay	(Italy) Paolo Bertolucci	(Hungary) Róbert Machán (Hungary) Balázs Taróczy	6–3, 3–6, 6–4
Win	4–0	Jul 1974	Båstad, Sweden	Clay	(Italy) Paolo Bertolucci	(Sweden) Ove Nils Bengtson (Sweden) Björn Borg	3–6, 6–2, 6–4
Loss	4–1	Feb 1975	Richmond WCT, U.S.	Carpet	(Italy) Paolo Bertolucci	(Austria) Hans Kary (United States) Fred McNair	6–7^{(6–8)}, 7–5, 6–7^{(6–8)}
Win	5–1	Feb 1975	Bologna Indoor, Italy	Carpet (i)	(Italy) Paolo Bertolucci	(United States) Arthur Ashe (Netherlands) Tom Okker	6–3, 3–6, 6–3
Loss	5–2	Feb 1975	Barcelona WCT, Spain	Carpet (i)	(Italy) Paolo Bertolucci	(United States) Arthur Ashe (Netherlands) Tom Okker	5–7, 1–6
Win	6–2	Mar 1975	London WCT, UK	Carpet (i)	(Italy) Paolo Bertolucci	(West Germany) Jürgen Fassbender (West Germany) Hans-Jürgen Pohmann	6–3, 6–4
Win	7–2	Jul 1975	Kitzbühel, Austria	Clay	(Italy) Paolo Bertolucci	(France) Patrice Dominguez (France) François Jauffret	6–2, 6–2, 7–6
Win	8–2	Nov 1975	Buenos Aires, Argentina	Clay	(Italy) Paolo Bertolucci	(West Germany) Jürgen Fassbender (West Germany) Hans-Jürgen Pohmann	7–6, 6–7, 6–4
Loss	8–3	Apr 1976	Stockholm, Sweden	Carpet (i)	(Netherlands) Tom Okker	(Soviet Union) Alex Metreveli (Romania) Ilie Năstase	4–6, 5–7
Loss	8–4	Jul 1976	Gstaad, Switzerland	Clay	(Italy) Paolo Bertolucci	(West Germany) Jürgen Fassbender (West Germany) Hans-Jürgen Pohmann	5–7, 3–6, 3–6
Loss	8–5	Feb 1977	Mexico City WCT, Mexico	Hard	(Romania) Ilie Năstase	(Poland) Wojtek Fibak (Netherlands) Tom Okker	2–6, 3–6
Win	9–5	Mar 1977	St. Louis WCT, U.S.	Carpet (i)	(Romania) Ilie Năstase	(India) Vijay Amritraj (United States) Dick Stockton	6–4, 3–6, 7–6
Win	10–5	Apr 1977	London WCT, UK	Carpet (i)	(Romania) Ilie Năstase	(United Kingdom) Mark Cox (United States) Eddie Dibbs	7–6, 6–7, 6–3
Win	11–5	Apr 1977	Houston WCT, U.S.	Clay	(Romania) Ilie Năstase	(Australia) John Alexander (Australia) Phil Dent	6–3, 6–4
Loss	11–6	Apr 1977	Charlotte WCT, U.S.	Clay	(Italy) Corrado Barazzutti	(Netherlands) Tom Okker (Australia) Ken Rosewall	1–6, 6–3, 6–7
Loss	11–7	May 1977	Masters Doubles WCT, Kansas City	Carpet (i)	(United States) Vitas Gerulaitis	(India) Vijay Amritraj (United States) Dick Stockton	6–7, 6–7, 6–4, 3–6
Win	12–7	May 1978	Florence, Italy	Clay	(Italy) Corrado Barazzutti	(Australia) Mark Edmondson (Australia) John Marks	6–3, 6–7, 6–3
Loss	12–8	Apr 1979	Las Vegas, U.S.	Hard	(Mexico) Raúl Ramírez	(United States) Marty Riessen (United States) Sherwood Stewart	6–4, 4–6, 6–7
Win	13–8	May 1979	Florence, Italy	Clay	(Italy) Paolo Bertolucci	(Czechoslovakia) Ivan Lendl (Czechoslovakia) Pavel Složil	6–4, 6–3
Win	14–8	Oct 1979	Barcelona, Spain	Clay	(Italy) Paolo Bertolucci	(Brazil) Carlos Kirmayr (Brazil) Cássio Motta	6–4, 6–3
Win	15–8	Apr 1980	Monte Carlo, Monaco	Clay	(Italy) Paolo Bertolucci	(United States) Vitas Gerulaitis (United States) John McEnroe	6–2, 5–7, 6–3
Loss	15–9	May 1980	Florence, Italy	Clay	(Italy) Paolo Bertolucci	(United States) Gene Mayer (Mexico) Raúl Ramírez	1–6, 4–6
Win	16–9	Nov 1980	Paris Indoor, France	Hard (i)	(Italy) Paolo Bertolucci	(United States) Brian Gottfried (South Africa) Raymond Moore	6–4, 6–4
Win	17–9	Mar 1981	Nancy, France	Carpet (i)	(Romania) Ilie Năstase	(United Kingdom) John Feaver (Czechoslovakia) Jiří Hřebec	6–4, 2–6, 6–4
Loss	17–10	May 1981	Florence, Italy	Clay	(Italy) Paolo Bertolucci	(Mexico) Raúl Ramírez (Czechoslovakia) Pavel Složil	3–6, 6–3, 3–6
Win	18–10	May 1982	Florence, Italy	Clay	(Italy) Paolo Bertolucci	(United States) Sammy Giammalva Jr. (United States) Tony Giammalva	7–6, 6–1

== Singles performance timeline ==
Key
W	F	SF	QF	#R	RR	Q#	DNQ	A	NH

(W) winner; (F) finalist; (SF) semifinalist; (QF) quarterfinalist; (#R) rounds 4, 3, 2, 1; (RR) round-robin stage; (Q#) qualification round; (DNQ) did not qualify; (A) absent; (NH) not held; (SR) strike rate (events won / competed); (W–L) win–loss record.

Tournament	1969	1970	1971	1972	1973	1974	1975	1976	1977	1978	1979	1980	1981	1982	1983	SR	W–L
Grand Slam tournaments
Australian Open	1R	A	A	A	A	A	A	A	A	A	A	A	A	A	A	0 / 1	0–1
French Open	1R	4R	3R	QF	SF	2R	SF	W	QF	2R	3R	1R	2R	2R	A	1 / 14	34–13
Wimbledon	Q1	1R	3R	3R	A	3R	3R	3R	2R	A	QF	3R	A	A	A	0 / 9	17–9
US Open	A	A	A	1R	3R	A	A	2R	3R	4R	1R	A	3R	A	A	0 / 7	10–7
Win–loss	0–2	3–2	4–2	5–3	7–2	2–2	7–2	10–2	7–3	4–2	6–3	2–2	3–2	1–1	0–0	1 / 31	61–30
Other
Italian Open	2R	2R	2R	1R	2R	1R	3R	W	QF	F	QF	2R	QF	1R	1R	1 / 15	27–14
Ranking
Year-end ranking	–	–	–	–	14	34	14	7	23	23	29	34	39	76			

== See also ==
- Tennis in Italy
