= The West Hants Club =

Recreation club in Bournemouth, Dorset, England

Coordinates: 50.7372°N 1.8871°W

The West Hants Club (often known simply as West Hants) is a sports and fitness club situated in Bournemouth, Dorset in the south of England. The club is primarily a tennis club but also incorporates a gym, swimming pool and squash and racquetball courts.

West Hants was opened in 1926 and two years later the club began hosting the British Hard Court Championships, an event that was held there for 55 years until 1983. The 1968 British Hard Court Championships was the first 'open' tournament of the so-called Open Era, where both professionals and amateurs could compete.

Between 1996 and 2000, the Bournemouth International men's singles and doubles events were played at the club.

== Major tennis tournaments ==
=== British Hard Court Championships ===
In 1928, two years after the formation of the club, West Hants hosted the British Hard Court Championships. The event attracted a host of notable names over the 55 years it was held, including Virginia Wade, Rod Laver, Fred Perry, Ken Rosewall, Ann Jones, Ilie Năstase, Evonne Goolagong and many more.

The club is also notable for having held the first 'open' event of tennis' Open Era, a tournament that admitted both amateurs and professionals to compete. The Hardcourt Championships was one of 12 to be granted a privileged status as the host of professional tennis.

=== Bournemouth International ===
West Hants hosted the men's tournaments at the Bournemouth International from 1996 to 1999, the only British event held on clay. The tournament was won by Albert Costa in 1996 and Félix Mantilla in 1997 and 1998. Adrian Voinea emerged victorious in 1999 before the tournament relocated to Brighton and was staged on hard courts. Greg Rusedski was the most successful British player when he reached the semi-finals in 1997 losing to Carlos Moyá.
