= Bologna Indoor =

Defunct tennis tournament
- Event name: WCT Bologna (1971–75); Bologna Indoor (1978–81)
- Tour: WCT circuit (1971–75); Grand Prix circuit (1978–81)
- Founded: 1971
- Abolished: 1981
- Editions: 7
- Surface: Carpet

The Bologna Indoor is a defunct WCT and Grand Prix affiliated men's tennis tournament played from 1971 to 1981. It was held in Bologna in Italy and played on indoor carpet courts.

== Results ==
=== Singles ===
| Year | Champions | Runners-up | Score |
|---|---|---|---|
| 1971 | (Australia) Rod Laver | (United States) Arthur Ashe | 6–3, 6–4, 6–4 |
| 1972 - 1973 | Not held | | |
| 1974 | (United States) Arthur Ashe | (United Kingdom) Mark Cox | 6–4, 7–5 |
| 1975 | (Sweden) Björn Borg | (United States) Arthur Ashe | 7–6, 4–6, 7–6 |
| 1976 - 1977 | Not held | | |
| 1978 | (United States) Peter Fleming | (Italy) Adriano Panatta | 6–2, 7–6^{(5)} |
| 1979 | (United States) Butch Walts | (Italy) Gianni Ocleppo | 6–3, 6–2 |
| 1980 | (Czechoslovakia) Tomáš Šmíd | (Italy) Paolo Bertolucci | 7–5, 6–2 |
| 1981 | (United States) Sandy Mayer | (Romania) Ilie Năstase | 7–5, 6–3 |

=== Doubles ===
| Year | Champions | Runners-up | Score |
|---|---|---|---|
| 1971 | (Australia) Ken Rosewall (Australia) Fred Stolle | (South Africa) Bob Maud (South Africa) Frew McMillan | 6–7, 6–2, 6–3, 6–3 |
| 1972 - 1973 | Not held | | |
| 1974 | (Sweden) Ove Nils Bengtson (Sweden) Björn Borg | (United States) Arthur Ashe (United States) Roscoe Tanner | 6–4, 5–7, 4–6, 7–6, 6–2 |
| 1975 | (Italy) Paolo Bertolucci (Italy) Adriano Panatta | (United States) Arthur Ashe (Netherlands) Tom Okker | 6–3, 3–6, 6–3 |
| 1976 - 1977 | Not held | | |
| 1978 | (United States) Peter Fleming (United States) John McEnroe | (France) Jean-Louis Haillet (Italy) Antonio Zugarelli | 6–1, 6–4 |
| 1979 | (United States) Peter Fleming (United States) John McEnroe | (United States) Fritz Buehning (United States) Ferdi Taygan | 6–1, 6–1 |
| 1980 | (Hungary) Balázs Taróczy (United States) Butch Walts | (United States) Steve Denton (Australia) Paul McNamee | 2–6, 6–3, 6–0 |
| 1981 | (United States) Sammy Giammalva Jr. (France) Henri Leconte | (Czechoslovakia) Tomáš Šmíd (Hungary) Balázs Taróczy | 7–6, 6–4 |

== See also ==
- Bologna Outdoor
