= 1960 Wimbledon Championships – Men's doubles =

Men's doubles
- 1960 Wimbledon Championships

Final
- Champions: (Mexico) Rafael Osuna (United States) Dennis Ralston
- Runners-up: (United Kingdom) Mike Davies (United Kingdom) Bobby Wilson
- Score: 7–5, 6–3, 10–8

Details
- Draw: 64 (5Q)
- Seeds: 4

Events
Singles	men	women		boys	girls
Doubles	men	women	mixed	boys	girls
← 1959 ·	Wimbledon Championships	· 1961 →

Roy Emerson and Neale Fraser were the defending champions, but lost in the quarterfinals to Mike Davies and Bobby Wilson.

Rafael Osuna and Dennis Ralston defeated Davies and Wilson in the final, 7–5, 6–3, 10–8 to win the gentlemen's doubles tennis title at the 1960 Wimbledon Championship.

== Seeds ==
1. (Australia) Roy Emerson / (Australia) Neale Fraser (quarterfinals)
2. (Australia) Rod Laver / (Australia) Bob Mark (semifinals)
3. (Spain) José Luis Arilla / (Spain) Andrés Gimeno (first round)
4. (Italy) Nicola Pietrangeli / (Italy) Orlando Sirola (second round)

Click on the seed number of a player to go to their draw section.

== Draw ==
Key

- Q = Qualifier
- WC = Wild card
- LL = Lucky loser
- Alt = Alternate
- ITF = ITF entry
- PR = Protected ranking
- SR = Special ranking
- SE = Special exempt
- JE = Junior exempt
- JR = Junior Accelerator Programme entrant
- CO = College Accelerator Programme entrant
- NG = Next Gen Accelerator Program entrant
- w/o = Walkover
- r = Retired
- d = Defaulted

=== Finals ===
Quarterfinals
2	(Australia) Rod Laver (Australia) Bob Mark	6	3	6	6
(Spain) Juan Manuel Couder (Spain) Manuel Santana	4	6	2	2
(Mexico) Rafael Osuna (United States) Dennis Ralston	6	6	6
(South Africa) Bertie Gaertner (South Africa) Ian Vermaak	4	4	2
(Australia) Bob Hewitt (Australia) Martin Mulligan	7	5	11	6
(United States) Ronnie Holmberg (United States) Barry MacKay	5	7	9	4
(United Kingdom) Mike Davies (United Kingdom) Bobby Wilson	6	6	3	4	6
1	(Australia) Roy Emerson (Australia) Neale Fraser	3	4	6	6	3

Semifinals
2	(Australia) Rod Laver (Australia) Bob Mark	6	8	13	6	9
(Mexico) Rafael Osuna (United States) Dennis Ralston	4	10	15	4	11
(Australia) Bob Hewitt (Australia) Martin Mulligan	6	3	2	4
(United Kingdom) Mike Davies (United Kingdom) Bobby Wilson	3	6	6	6

Final
(Mexico) Rafael Osuna (United States) Dennis Ralston	7	6	10
(United Kingdom) Mike Davies (United Kingdom) Bobby Wilson	5	3	8

=== Top half ===
==== Section 1 ====
First round
2	(Australia) Rod Laver (Australia) Bob Mark	6	6	6
(Mexico) Alfonso Ochoa (Mexico) Antonio Palafox	3	2	4
(Chile) Ernesto Aguirre (Chile) Patricio Rodríguez	3	10	4	7	11
Q	(United Kingdom) Trevor Adamson (United Kingdom) Charlie Applewhaite	6	8	6	5	9
(France) Jean-Noël Grinda (France) Jean-Claude Molinari	6	6	6
(South Africa) Keith Diepraam (South Africa) Robin Sanders	3	2	4
(Norway) Thorvald Moe (Norway) Finn Søhol	6	6	6
(Netherlands) Pieter van Eijsden (Netherlands) Willem Maris	4	4	3
(United States) Butch Buchholz (United States) Chuck McKinley	6	6	3	5	6
(India) Ramanathan Krishnan (India) Naresh Kumar	2	4	6	7	3
(France) Pierre Darmon (France) Christian Duxin	6	0	7	2
(United Kingdom) Billy Knight (United Kingdom) Mike Sangster	8	6	5	6
(West Germany) Christian Kuhnke (West Germany) Wolfgang Stuck	5	4	6	4
(Spain) Juan Manuel Couder (Spain) Manuel Santana	7	6	4	6
Q	(United Kingdom) Julian Coni (United Kingdom) Freddie Field	10	6	6
(Socialist Federal Republic of Yugoslavia) Boro Jovanović (Socialist Federal Republic of Yugoslavia) Ivko Plećević	8	2	2

Second round
2	(Australia) R Laver (Australia) R Mark	6	6	7
(Chile) E Aguirre (Chile) P Rodríguez	4	1	5
(France) J-N Grinda (France) J-C Molinari	14	4	6	8	6
(Norway) T Moe (Norway) F Søhol	12	6	3	10	4
(United States) E Buchholz (United States) C McKinley	6	6	7
(United Kingdom) W Knight (United Kingdom) M Sangster	4	4	5
(Spain) JM Couder (Spain) M Santana	6	6	6
Q	(United Kingdom) J Coni (United Kingdom) F Field	3	1	3

Third round
2	(Australia) R Laver (Australia) R Mark	6	6	7
(France) J-N Grinda (France) J-C Molinari	2	2	5
(United States) E Buchholz (United States) C McKinley	w/o
(Spain) JM Couder (Spain) M Santana

Quarterfinals
2	(Australia) R Laver (Australia) R Mark	6	3	6	6
(Spain) JM Couder (Spain) M Santana	4	6	2	2

==== Section 2 ====
First round
4	(Italy) Nicola Pietrangeli (Italy) Orlando Sirola	6	6	6
(West Germany) Ingo Buding (Finland) Reino Nyyssönen	3	4	1
(Mexico) Rafael Osuna (United States) Dennis Ralston	6	6	9	5	16
Q	(United Kingdom) Gerry Oakley (United Kingdom) Humphrey Truman	3	4	11	7	14
(Brazil) Ronnie Barnes (Brazil) Carlos Fernandes	10	7	3	6	7
(Sweden) Jan-Erik Lundqvist (Sweden) Ulf Schmidt	12	5	6	4	9
(Australia) Bob Howe (South Africa) Abe Segal	6	6	6
(Soviet Union) Toomas Leius (Soviet Union) Mikhail Mozer	1	4	1
(United Kingdom) Roger Becker (United Kingdom) Tony Pickard	0	20	2	6	6
(New Zealand) Lew Gerrard (New Zealand) Mark Otway	6	18	6	3	4
(United States) Frank Froehling (United States) Bobby Siska	4	6	6	6
(France) Jean Borotra (France) Jacques Mey	6	3	4	4
(United States) Hugh Ditzler (United States) Clifton Mayne	3	1	1
(South Africa) Bertie Gaertner (South Africa) Ian Vermaak	6	6	6
(United States) John Cranston (United States) Jon Douglas	6	6	11
(Argentina) Roberto Aubone (Poland) Wiesław Gąsiorek	3	4	9

Second round
4	(Italy) N Pietrangeli (Italy) O Sirola	6	6	6	3	0
(Mexico) R Osuna (United States) D Ralston	4	8	4	6	6
(Sweden) J-E Lundqvist (Sweden) U Schmidt	6	6	6
(Australia) R Howe (South Africa) A Segal	4	4	4
(United Kingdom) R Becker (United Kingdom) A Pickard	6	4	4	9	6
(United States) F Froehling (United States) R Siska	3	6	6	7	3
(South Africa) A Gaertner (South Africa) I Vermaak	2	6	6	3	8
(United States) J Cranston (United States) J Douglas	6	3	4	6	6

Third round
(Mexico) R Osuna (United States) D Ralston	6	6	6
(Sweden) J-E Lundqvist (Sweden) U Schmidt	4	4	4
(United Kingdom) R Becker (United Kingdom) A Pickard	6	5	4	3
(South Africa) A Gaertner (South Africa) I Vermaak	4	7	6	6

Quarterfinals
(Mexico) R Osuna (United States) D Ralston	6	6	6
(South Africa) A Gaertner (South Africa) I Vermaak	4	4	2

=== Bottom half ===
==== Section 3 ====
First round
(United States) Pablo Eisenberg (United States) Herbie Flam	w/o
(Australia) Bob Hewitt (Australia) Martin Mulligan
(Denmark) Kurt Nielsen (Denmark) Jørgen Ulrich	0	4	4
(Federation of Rhodesia and Nyasaland) Adrian Bey (Australia) Neville Nette	6	6	6
(South Africa) John Hammill (South Africa) Rod Mandelstam	6	3	6	6
(Australia) Will Coghlan (Australia) Adrian Quist	2	6	2	4
(United States) Malcolm Fox (United States) Butch Krikorian	6	4	4	0
Q	(Australia) Alan Bailey (South Africa) David Samaai	4	6	6	6
(Republic of Ireland) Joe Hackett (Republic of Ireland) Guy Jackson	4	0	4
(United States) Ronnie Holmberg (United States) Barry MacKay	6	6	6
(United States) Jack Frost (South Africa) Gaetan Koenig	2	6	6	11
(France) Daniel Contet (France) Robert Haillet	6	1	0	9
(Belgium) Jacques Brichant (Australia) Warren Woodcock	6	6	6
(Austria) Franz Hainka (Austria) Franz Saiko	2	4	1
(Mexico) Francisco Contreras (Mexico) Mario Llamas	11	15	6
3	(Spain) José Luis Arilla (Spain) Andrés Gimeno	9	13	3

Second round
(Australia) R Hewitt (Australia) M Mulligan	6	1	6	6
(Federation of Rhodesia and Nyasaland) A Bey (Australia) N Nette	4	6	2	3
(South Africa) J Hammill (South Africa) R Mandelstam	12	6	6
Q	(Australia) A Bailey (South Africa) D Samaai	10	3	2
(United States) R Holmberg (United States) B MacKay	6	7	6
(United States) J Frost (South Africa) G Koenig	3	5	2
(Belgium) J Brichant (Australia) W Woodcock	3	1	6	6	4
(Mexico) F Contreras (Mexico) M Llamas	6	6	2	4	6

Third round
(Australia) R Hewitt (Australia) M Mulligan	7	7	6	3	6
(South Africa) J Hammill (South Africa) R Mandelstam	5	9	2	6	3
(United States) R Holmberg (United States) B MacKay	4	8	10	4	6
(Mexico) F Contreras (Mexico) M Llamas	6	6	8	6	3

Quarterfinals
(Australia) R Hewitt (Australia) M Mulligan	7	5	11	6
(United States) R Holmberg (United States) B MacKay	5	7	9	4

==== Section 4 ====
First round
(United States) Gardnar Mulloy (United States) Budge Patty	7	14	6	6	2
(Chile) Luis Ayala (Australia) Don Candy	5	16	4	8	6
Q	(India) Jaidip Mukerjea (India) Arcot Udaykumar	6	6	7	4	6
(United Kingdom) Geoffrey Paish (United Kingdom) Geoff Ward	4	4	9	6	4
(Italy) Alberto Lazzarino (Italy) Sergio Tacchini	6	4	3	8	4
(West Germany) Wilhelm Bungert (West Germany) Dieter Ecklebe	4	6	6	6	6
(United Kingdom) Mike Davies (United Kingdom) Bobby Wilson	6	7	6
(United Kingdom) Peter Moys (United Kingdom) John Ward	1	5	2
(United Kingdom) John Barrett (United Kingdom) Alan Mills	6	8	9	0^{r}
(Australia) John Pearce (Australia) Fred Stolle	8	6	11	0
(United Kingdom) Michael Hann (United Kingdom) Ivor Warwick	4	3	10	6	6
(Hungary) István Gulyás (Czechoslovakia) Jiří Javorský	6	6	8	3	4
(Austria) Ladislav Legenstein (Denmark) Torben Ulrich	6	9	6
(New Zealand) John McDonald (Australia) John O'Brien	3	7	3
(Australia) Alan Lane (Australia) Barry Phillips-Moore	2	4	11	2
1	(Australia) Roy Emerson (Australia) Neale Fraser	6	6	9	6

Second round
(Chile) L Ayala (Australia) D Candy	5	6	6	7
Q	(India) J Mukerjea (India) A Udaykumar	7	0	4	5
(West Germany) W Bungert (West Germany) D Ecklebe	4	4	8	6	6
(United Kingdom) M Davies (United Kingdom) R Wilson	6	6	6	4	8
(Australia) J Pearce (Australia) F Stolle	10	6	6
(United Kingdom) M Hann (United Kingdom) I Warwick	8	1	2
(Austria) L Legenstein (Denmark) T Ulrich	2	5	0
1	(Australia) R Emerson (Australia) N Fraser	6	7	6

Third round
(Chile) L Ayala (Australia) D Candy	1	6	4	4
(United Kingdom) M Davies (United Kingdom) R Wilson	6	3	6	6
(Australia) J Pearce (Australia) F Stolle	3	8	2
1	(Australia) R Emerson (Australia) N Fraser	6	10	6

Quarterfinals
(United Kingdom) M Davies (United Kingdom) R Wilson	6	6	3	4	6
1	(Australia) R Emerson (Australia) N Fraser	3	4	6	6	3
