= 1960 in tennis =

This page covers all the important events in the sport of tennis in 1960. It provides the results of notable tournaments throughout the year on both the men's and women's ILTF tennis circuits.

== Australian Open ==
Category	Champion(s)	Finalist(s)	Score
Men's singles	(Australia) Rod Laver	(Australia) Neale Fraser	5–7, 3–6, 6–3, 8–6, 8–6
Women's singles	(Australia) Margaret Smith	(Australia) Jan Lehane	7–5, 6–2
Men's doubles	(Australia) Rod Laver (Australia) Bob Mark	(Australia) Roy Emerson (Australia) Neale Fraser	1–6, 6–2, 6–4, 6–4
Women's doubles	(Brazil) Maria Bueno (United Kingdom) Christine Truman	(Australia) Lorraine Robinson (Australia) Margaret Smith	6–2, 5–7, 6–2
Mixed doubles	(Australia) Jan Lehane (South Africa) Trevor Fancutt	(Australia) Mary Carter Reitano (Australia) Bob Mark	6–2, 7–5

== French Open ==
Category	Champion(s)	Finalist(s)	Score
Men's singles	(Italy) Nicola Pietrangeli	(Chile) Luis Ayala	3–6, 6–3, 6–4, 4–6, 6–3
Women's singles	(United States) Darlene Hard	(Mexico) Yola Ramírez	6–3, 6–4
Men's doubles	(Australia) Roy Emerson (Australia) Neale Fraser	(Spain) José Luis Arilla (Spain) Andrés Gimeno	6–2, 8–10, 7–5, 6–4
Women's doubles	(Brazil) Maria Bueno (United States) Darlene Hard	(United Kingdom) Pat Ward Hales (United Kingdom) Ann Haydon	6–2, 7–5
Mixed doubles	(Brazil) Maria Bueno (Australia) Bob Howe	(United Kingdom) Ann Haydon (Australia) Roy Emerson	1–6, 6–1, 6–2

== Wimbledon ==
Category	Champion(s)	Finalist(s)	Score
Men's singles	(Australia) Neale Fraser	(Australia) Rod Laver	6–4, 3–6, 9–7, 7–5
Women's singles	(Brazil) Maria Bueno	(South Africa) Sandra Reynolds	8–6, 6–0
Men's doubles	(Mexico) Rafael Osuna (United States) Dennis Ralston	(United Kingdom) Mike Davies (United Kingdom) Bobby Wilson	7–5, 6–3, 10–8
Women's doubles	(Brazil) Maria Bueno (United States) Darlene Hard	(South Africa) Sandra Reynolds (South Africa) Renée Schuurman	6–4, 6–0
Mixed doubles	(Australia) Rod Laver (United States) Darlene Hard	(Australia) Robert Howe (Brazil) Maria Bueno	13–11, 3–6, 8–6

== US Open ==
Category	Champion(s)	Finalist(s)	Score
Men's singles	(Australia) Neale Fraser	(Australia) Rod Laver	6–4, 6–4, 9–7
Women's singles	(United States) Darlene Hard	(Brazil) Maria Bueno	6–4, 10–12, 6–4
Men's doubles	(Australia) Neale Fraser (Australia) Roy Emerson	(Australia) Rod Laver (Australia) Bob Mark	9–7, 6–2, 6–4
Women's doubles	(Brazil) Maria Bueno (United States) Darlene Hard	(United Kingdom) Ann Haydon (United Kingdom) Deidre Catt	6–1, 6–1
Mixed doubles	(United States) Margaret Osborne duPont (Australia) Neale Fraser	(Brazil) Maria Bueno (Mexico) Antonio Palafox	6–3, 6–2
