= 1960 Wimbledon Championships – Mixed doubles =

Mixed doubles
- 1960 Wimbledon Championships

Final
- Champions: (Australia) Rod Laver (United States) Darlene Hard
- Runners-up: (Australia) Bob Howe (Brazil) Maria Bueno
- Score: 13–11, 3–6, 8–6

Details
- Draw: 80 (5Q)
- Seeds: 4

Events
Singles	men	women		boys	girls
Doubles	men	women	mixed	boys	girls
← 1959 ·	Wimbledon Championships	· 1961 →

Rod Laver and Darlene Hard successfully defended their title, defeating Bob Howe and Maria Bueno in the final, 13–11, 3–6, 8–6 to win the mixed doubles tennis title at the 1960 Wimbledon Championships.

== Seeds ==
1. (Australia) Rod Laver / (United States) Darlene Hard (champions)
2. (Australia) Bob Howe / (Brazil) Maria Bueno (final)
3. (Australia) Roy Emerson / (United Kingdom) Ann Haydon (third round)
4. (Australia) Bob Hewitt / (Australia) Jan Lehane (fourth round)

Click on the seed number of a player to go to their draw section.

== Draw ==
Key

- Q = Qualifier
- WC = Wild card
- LL = Lucky loser
- Alt = Alternate
- ITF = ITF entry
- PR = Protected ranking
- SR = Special ranking
- SE = Special exempt
- JE = Junior exempt
- JR = Junior Accelerator Programme entrant
- CO = College Accelerator Programme entrant
- NG = Next Gen Accelerator Program entrant
- w/o = Walkover
- r = Retired
- d = Defaulted

=== Finals ===
Quarterfinals
1	(Australia) Rod Laver (United States) Darlene Hard	6	7
(Mexico) Antonio Palafox (Italy) Lea Pericoli	4	5
(Australia) Bob Mark (United States) Janet Hopps	6	9
(United Kingdom) John Barrett (United Kingdom) Billie Woodgate	4	7
(United States) Dennis Ralston (United States) Karen Hantze	6	4	7
(Czechoslovakia) Jiří Javorský (Czechoslovakia) Věra Pužejová	2	6	9
(United States) Gardnar Mulloy (United Kingdom) Rita Bentley	7	2
2	(Australia) Bob Howe (Brazil) Maria Bueno	9	6

Semifinals
1	(Australia) Rod Laver (United States) Darlene Hard	4	6	6
(Australia) Bob Mark (United States) Janet Hopps	6	1	2
(Czechoslovakia) Jiří Javorský (Czechoslovakia) Věra Pužejová	1	6	4
2	(Australia) Bob Howe (Brazil) Maria Bueno	6	2	6

Final
1	(Australia) Rod Laver (United States) Darlene Hard	13	3	8
2	(Australia) Bob Howe (Brazil) Maria Bueno	11	6	6

=== Top half ===
==== Section 1 ====
First round

Second round
1	(Australia) Rod Laver (United States) Darlene Hard	6	6
(New Zealand) Lew Gerrard (New Zealand) Ruia Morrison	1	1
(Denmark) Jan Leschly (Hungary) Márta Peterdy-Wolf	w/o
(Denmark) Kurt Nielsen (Denmark) Lisa Kaae Sørensen
(United Kingdom) Geoff Ward (United Kingdom) Rosemary Deloford	2	2
(Australia) Martin Mulligan (Australia) Mary Hawton	6	6
(United Kingdom) Howard Walton (Australia) Norma Marsh	2	2
(South Africa) Bertie Gaertner (South Africa) Renée Schuurman	6	6

Third round
1	(Australia) R Laver (United States) D Hard	6	6
(Denmark) K Nielsen (Denmark) L Kaae Sørensen	2	3
(Australia) M Mulligan (Australia) M Hawton	1	4
(South Africa) A Gaertner (South Africa) R Schuurman	6	6

Fourth round
1	(Australia) R Laver (United States) D Hard	6	6	6
(South Africa) A Gaertner (South Africa) R Schuurman	2	8	4

==== Section 2 ====
First round

Second round
(United Kingdom) Tony Pickard (United Kingdom) Sheila Armstrong	7	3
(Mexico) Antonio Palafox (Italy) Lea Pericoli	9	6
(United Kingdom) Roger Becker (United States) Dorothy Knode	6	7
(United Kingdom) Julian Coni (United Kingdom) Honor Clarke	1	5
(France) Philippe Chatrier (France) Susan Chatrier	6	6
(Sweden) Staffan Stockenberg (Sweden) Gudrun Rosin	4	3
(Australia) John Pearce (France) Aline Nenot	w/o
(United States) Jack Bryan (United States) Laura Bryan

Third round
(Mexico) A Palafox (Italy) L Pericoli	6	4	7
(United Kingdom) R Becker (United States) D Knode	1	6	5
(France) P Chatrier (France) S Chatrier	6	6
(United States) J Bryan (United States) L Bryan	1	2

Fourth round
(Mexico) A Palafox (Italy) L Pericoli	6	6
(France) P Chatrier (France) S Chatrier	1	0

==== Section 3 ====
First round

Second round
3	(Australia) Roy Emerson (United Kingdom) Ann Haydon	6	14
(Australia) Alan Lane (Belgium) Christiane Mercelis	1	12
(Australia) Bob Mark (United States) Janet Hopps	6	6
(United Kingdom) Mike Sangster (United Kingdom) Elaine Shenton	2	3
(United States) Pablo Eisenberg (United Kingdom) Gem Hoahing	w/o
Q	(United Kingdom) Jimmy Upton (United Kingdom) Ruth Illingworth
(United Kingdom) Geoffrey Paish (United Kingdom) Anne Shilcock	6	6
(Brazil) Ronnie Barnes (United States) Gloria Butler	0	1

Third round
3	(Australia) R Emerson (United Kingdom) A Haydon	2	7
(Australia) R Mark (United States) J Hopps	6	9
(United Kingdom) J Upton (United Kingdom) R Illingworth	4	3
(United Kingdom) G Paish (United Kingdom) A Shilcock	6	6

Fourth round
(Australia) R Mark (United States) J Hopps	10	6
(United Kingdom) G Paish (United Kingdom) A Shilcock	8	1

==== Section 4 ====
First round
(South Africa) Gaetan Koenig (United Kingdom) Honor Durose	5	5
(Soviet Union) Toomas Leius (Soviet Union) Irina Ryazanova	7	7
(United Kingdom) Humphrey Truman (United Kingdom) Christine Truman	6	6
(France) Jean Borotra (France) Florence de la Courtie	1	3
(United Kingdom) John Barrett (United Kingdom) Billie Woodgate	6	6
(New Zealand) Brian Woolf (South Africa) Margaret Hunt	3	3
(Spain) Jaime Bartrolí (Spain) Carmen Coronado	2	5
(New Zealand) Mark Otway (United Kingdom) Georgie Cox	6	7
Q	(New Zealand) Grantley Judge (United Kingdom) Carol Webb	6	6
Q	(New Zealand) John McDonald (United Kingdom) Judy Tee	2	3
(Austria) Franz Hainka (Austria) Edda Herdy	6	2	4
(United Kingdom) Lawrie Strong (United Kingdom) Pat Wheeler	4	6	6
(India) Naresh Kumar (Austria) Sonja Pachta	6	6	4
(Australia) Neville Nette (United Kingdom) Pat Hird	3	8	6
(South Africa) Abe Segal (South Africa) Heather Segal
(Switzerland) Heinz Grimm (Switzerland) Ruth Kaufmann	w/o

Second round
(Soviet Union) T Leius (Soviet Union) I Ryazanova	5	5
(United Kingdom) H Truman (United Kingdom) C Truman	7	7
(United Kingdom) J Barrett (United Kingdom) R Woodgate	4	6	6
(New Zealand) M Otway (United Kingdom) G Cox	6	2	4
(New Zealand) G Judge (United Kingdom) C Webb	2	7	0
(United Kingdom) L Strong (United Kingdom) P Wheeler	6	5	6
(Australia) N Nette (United Kingdom) P Hird	2	7	6
(South Africa) A Segal (South Africa) H Segal	6	5	3

Third round
(United Kingdom) H Truman (United Kingdom) C Truman	3	4
(United Kingdom) J Barrett (United Kingdom) R Woodgate	6	6
(United Kingdom) L Strong (United Kingdom) P Wheeler	6	6
(Australia) N Nette (United Kingdom) P Hird	1	3

Fourth round
(United Kingdom) J Barrett (United Kingdom) R Woodgate	6	6
(United Kingdom) L Strong (United Kingdom) P Wheeler	2	4

=== Bottom half ===
==== Section 5 ====
First round
(South Africa) Basil Wheeler (Australia) Dawn Thomas	2	4
(Chile) Luis Ayala (Chile) Maria Ayala	6	6
(West Germany) Ingo Buding (West Germany) Edda Buding	2	4
(South Africa) John Hammill (South Africa) Marlene Gerson	6	6
(South Africa) Rod Mandelstam (South Africa) Meryl Hammill	3	4
(Mexico) Alfonso Ochoa (Mexico) Yola Ramírez	6	6
Q	(United Kingdom) Mark Cox (United Kingdom) Frances Walton	7	4
(Soviet Union) Mikhail Mozer (Soviet Union) Anna Dmitrieva	9	6
LL	(New Zealand) Robert Clarke (United Kingdom) Bobbie Wilson	2	6	9
(Denmark) Jørgen Ulrich (West Germany) Mrs Ulrich	6	4	7
(United States) Bill Davis (United Kingdom) Sheila Bramley	2	0
(Australia) Alan Bailey (United Kingdom) Caroline Yates-Bell	6	6
(United Kingdom) Colin Hannam (United Kingdom) Deidre Catt	4	2
(South Africa) David Samaai (United Kingdom) Viola White	6	6
(United States) Dennis Ralston (United States) Karen Hantze
(United Kingdom) Alan Mills (United Kingdom) Jill Mills	w/o

Second round
(Chile) L Ayala (Chile) M Ayala	7	6
(South Africa) J Hammill (South Africa) M Gerson	5	1
(Mexico) A Ochoa (Mexico) Y Ramírez	8	6	1
(Soviet Union) M Mozer (Soviet Union) A Dmitrieva	10	3	6
(New Zealand) R Clarke (United Kingdom) B Wilson	6	3
(Australia) A Bailey (United Kingdom) C Yates-Bell	8	6
(South Africa) D Samaai (United Kingdom) V White	2	3
(United States) D Ralston (United States) K Hantze	6	6

Third round
(Chile) L Ayala (Chile) M Ayala	6	2	6
(Soviet Union) M Mozer (Soviet Union) A Dmitrieva	3	6	4
(Australia) A Bailey (United Kingdom) C Yates-Bell	3	7
(United States) D Ralston (United States) K Hantze	6	9

Fourth round
(Chile) L Ayala (Chile) M Ayala	w/o
(United States) D Ralston (United States) K Hantze

==== Section 6 ====
First round

Second round
(Lebanon) Karim Fawaz (Lebanon) Vera Mattar	0	0
(Mexico) Rafael Osuna (United States) Sally Moore	6	6
(United Kingdom) Gerry Oakley (United Kingdom) Pat Hales	6	7	5
(Czechoslovakia) Jiří Javorský (Czechoslovakia) Věra Pužejová	2	9	7
(Colombia) William Álvarez (United States) Pat Stewart	6	2	6
(Spain) Emilio Martínez (Spain) Ana María Estalella	2	6	0
(Brazil) Carlos Fernandes (Australia) Margaret Hellyer	3	6	4
4	(Australia) Bob Hewitt (Australia) Jan Lehane	6	3	6

Third round
(Mexico) R Osuna (United States) S Moore	7	8	3
(Czechoslovakia) J Javorský (Czechoslovakia) V Pužejová	5	10	6
(Colombia) W Álvarez (United States) P Stewart	1	3
4	(Australia) R Hewitt (Australia) J Lehane	6	6

Fourth round
(Czechoslovakia) J Javorský (Czechoslovakia) V Pužejová	6	2	6
4	(Australia) R Hewitt (Australia) J Lehane	2	6	4

==== Section 7 ====
First round

Second round
(Norway) Thorvald Moe (Norway) Tone Schirmer	5	5
(Italy) Alberto Lazzarino (Italy) Silvana Lazzarino	7	7
(United States) Gardnar Mulloy (United Kingdom) Rita Bentley	6	2	6
(Australia) John Hillebrand (United Kingdom) Jenny Trewby	4	6	1
(Australia) Fred Stolle (South Africa) Bernice Vukovich	6	6
(Sweden) Jan-Erik Lundqvist (Sweden) Katarina Frendelius	4	2
(Mexico) Francisco Contreras (Australia) Genevieve O'Brien	9	5
(South Africa) Dicken Rigby (South Africa) Lynne Hutchings	11	7

Third round
(Italy) A Lazzarino (Italy) S Lazzarino	3	6	2
(United States) G Mulloy (United Kingdom) R Bentley	6	4	6
(Australia) F Stolle (South Africa) B Vukovich	3	6	6
(South Africa) D Rigby (South Africa) L Hutchings	6	4	0

Fourth round
(United States) G Mulloy (United Kingdom) R Bentley	9	6	6
(Australia) F Stolle (South Africa) B Vukovich	11	1	4

==== Section 8 ====
First round

Second round
Q	(United Kingdom) Dennis Hughes (United Kingdom) Penny Burrell	6	6	0
(United Kingdom) Freddie Field (United Kingdom) Hazel Cheadle	8	4	6
(India) Arcot Udaykumar (United Kingdom) Pauline Roberts	6	6
(New Zealand) Richard Hawkes (United Kingdom) Jenny Young	3	4
(United Kingdom) Billy Knight (United Kingdom) Shirley Brasher
(South Africa) Ian Vermaak (South Africa) Sandra Reynolds	w/o
(Australia) Barry Geraghty (United Kingdom) Robin Blakelock	2	2
2	(Australia) Bob Howe (Brazil) Maria Bueno	6	6

Third round
(United Kingdom) F Field (United Kingdom) H Cheadle	1	2
(India) A Udaykumar (United Kingdom) P Roberts	6	6
(United Kingdom) W Knight (United Kingdom) S Brasher	4	4
2	(Australia) R Howe (Brazil) M Bueno	6	6

Fourth round
(India) A Udaykumar (United Kingdom) P Roberts	4	3
2	(Australia) R Howe (Brazil) M Bueno	6	6
