= 1960 French Championships – Men's singles =

Men's singles
- 1960 French Championships

Final
- Champion: (Italy) Nicola Pietrangeli
- Runner-up: (Chile) Luis Ayala
- Score: 3–6, 6–3, 6–4, 4–6, 6–3

Details
- Draw: 86
- Seeds: 16

Events
Singles	men	women
Doubles	men	women
← 1959 ·	French Championships	· 1961 →

Sixth-seeded Nicola Pietrangeli defeated Luis Ayala 3–6, 6–3, 6–4, 4–6, 6–3 in the final to win the men's singles tennis title at the 1960 French Championships.

== Seeds ==
The seeded players are listed below. Nicola Pietrangeli is the champion; others show the round in which they were eliminated.

1. (United States) Barry MacKay (quarterfinals)
2. (Australia) Neale Fraser (quarterfinals)
3. (Spain) Andrés Gimeno (quarterfinals)
4. (Australia) Rod Laver (third round)
5. (Chile) Luis Ayala (final)
6. (Italy) Nicola Pietrangeli (champion)
7. (United Kingdom) Mike Davies (second round)
8. (Australia) Roy Emerson (third round)
9. (France) Pierre Darmon (fourth round)
10. (France) Robert Haillet (semifinals)
11. (South Africa) Ian Vermaak (second round)
12. (Italy) Giuseppe Merlo (fourth round)
13. (Belgium) Jacques Brichant (fourth round)
14. (Sweden) Jan-Erik Lundqvist (second round)
15. (United Kingdom) Billy Knight (fourth round)
16. (United Kingdom) Robert Keith Wilson (fourth round)

== Draw ==
=== Key ===
- Q = Qualifier
- WC = Wild card
- LL = Lucky loser
- r = Retired

=== Finals ===
Quarterfinals
1	(United States) Barry MacKay	3	5	2
(Italy) Orlando Sirola	6	7	6
(Spain) Manuel Santana	1	5	2
5	(Chile) Luis Ayala	6	7	6
6	(Italy) Nicola Pietrangeli	6	6	3	6
3	(Spain) Andrés Gimeno	3	1	6	2
10	(France) Robert Haillet	6	6	8	6
2	(Australia) Neale Fraser	4	2	10	5^{r}

Semifinals
(Italy) Orlando Sirola	4	0	2
5	(Chile) Luis Ayala	6	6	6
6	(Italy) Nicola Pietrangeli	6	7	7
10	(France) Robert Haillet	4	5	5

Final
5	(Chile) Luis Ayala	6	3	4	6	3
6	(Italy) Nicola Pietrangeli	3	6	6	4	6

=== Earlier rounds ===
==== Section 1 ====
First round

Second round
1	(United States) MacKay	8	6	6
(Poland) Gasiorek	6	1	4
(West Germany) Scholl
(France) Boutboul
16	(United Kingdom) Wilson
(Austria) Legenstein
(Brazil) Fernandes	6	6	4	6
(Sweden) Schmidt	4	3	6	2

Third round
1	(United States) MacKay	2	6	6	7
(France) Boutboul	6	2	1	5
16	(United Kingdom) Wilson	6	1	6	4	6
(Brazil) Fernandes	3	6	1	6	2

Fourth round
1	(United States) MacKay	9	3	6	6
16	(United Kingdom) Wilson	7	6	4	4

==== Section 2 ====
First round

Second round
8	(Australia) Emerson	6	1	6	6
(Spain) Arilla	0	6	2	0
(Denmark) Ulrich
(Italy) Sirola
9	(France) Darmon	6	6	6
(Brazil) Ribeiro	2	2	2
(Chile) Rodríguez	6	6	5	6
(West Germany) Ecklebe	2	1	7	2

Third round
8	(Australia) Emerson	6	5	6	5
(Italy) Sirola	3	7	8	7
9	(France) Darmon	6	6	6
(Chile) Rodríguez	4	2	2

Fourth round
(Italy) Sirola	6	4	4	6	6
9	(France) Darmon	3	6	6	2	4

==== Section 3 ====
First round
(United Kingdom) Drobný	6	6	6
(Socialist Federal Republic of Yugoslavia) Jovanović	1	2	4
(Italy) Maggi
(Colombia) Álvarez
(Australia) Howe	1	4	3
(Mexico) Contreras	6	6	6

Second round
4	(Australia) Laver	2	6	6	6	8
(Poland) Licis	6	8	4	3	6
(Spain) Santana	7	4	3	6	6
(West Germany) Kuhnke	5	6	6	1	4
13	(Belgium) Brichant	6	6	7
(United Kingdom) Drobný	3	2	5
(Colombia) Álvarez	6	2	2	6	2
(Mexico) Contreras	0	6	6	2	6

Third round
4	(Australia) Laver	1	6	4	7	3
(Spain) Santana	6	4	6	5	6
13	(Belgium) Brichant	6	6	3	2	6
(Mexico) Contreras	1	2	6	6	0

Fourth round
(Spain) Santana	6	6	6
13	(Belgium) Brichant	2	4	4

==== Section 4 ====
First round
5	(Chile) Ayala	6	6	4	6
(South Africa) Koenig	2	4	6	3
(Australia) Pearce	5	0	5
(Argentina) Soriano	7	6	7
(Belgium) Froment
(Hungary) Ádám-Stolpa
(Czechoslovakia) Javorský	6	4	4	6	6
(Australia) Woodcock	3	6	6	3	1
12	(Italy) Merlo	6	6	6
(Netherlands) van Eijsden	2	2	1
(Australia) Stolle
(Venezuela) Pimentel
(Mexico) Palafox	2	1	6	6	3
(France) Grinda	6	6	3	4	6
(France) Jalabert	6	6	2	4	6
(Australia) Phillips-Moore	4	2	6	6	1

Second round
5	(Chile) Ayala	6	7	6
(Argentina) Soriano	3	5	4
(Hungary) Ádám-Stolpa
(Czechoslovakia) Javorský
12	(Italy) Merlo	6	7	9
(Australia) Stolle	4	5	7
(France) Grinda	6	6	6
(France) Jalabert	3	4	4

Third round
5	(Chile) Ayala	4	6	6	6
(Czechoslovakia) Javorský	6	3	1	1
12	(Italy) Merlo	6	6	6
(France) Grinda	4	2	4

Fourth round
5	(Chile) Ayala	8	9	4	6
12	(Italy) Merlo	6	7	6	3

==== Section 5 ====
First round
(Argentina) Aubone	7	2	4
(Australia) Hewitt	9	6	6
(West Germany) Buding	6	6	6
(Soviet Union) Mozer	2	2	0
11	(South Africa) Vermaak	1	10	6	6	6
(United Kingdom) Sangster	6	12	1	3	1
(Australia) O'Brien	5	2	4
(France) Pilet	7	6	6
(Mexico) Llamas	6	6	7
(France) Chevret	2	3	5
(New Zealand) Otway	6	2	5
(United States) Patty	8	6	7
(Australia) Mulligan	6	6	6
(Monaco) Borghini	1	2	3
(France) Bresson	2	6	4	3
6	(Italy) Pietrangeli	6	3	6	6

Second round
(Australia) Hewitt	8	4	3
(West Germany) Buding	10	6	6
11	(South Africa) Vermaak	1	3	0
(France) Pilet	6	6	6
(Mexico) Llamas	7	6	6
(United States) Patty	5	2	2
(Australia) Mulligan	1	5	6	2
6	(Italy) Pietrangeli	6	7	2	6

Third round
(West Germany) Buding	8	1	6	12	5
(France) Pilet	6	6	4	14	7
(Mexico) Llamas	4	3	2
6	(Italy) Pietrangeli	6	6	6

Fourth round
(France) Pilet	2	2	3
6	(Italy) Pietrangeli	6	6	6

==== Section 6 ====
First round
(France) Molinari	6	6	6
(Soviet Union) Likhachev	2	0	2
(South Africa) Mandelstam	5	6	6	8	3
(New Zealand) Gerrard	7	2	0	10	6
(United States) Frost	6	2	4	6
(Australia) Candy	1	6	6	8

Second round
(France) Molinari	1	6	6	3
(New Zealand) Gerrard	6	8	4	6
(Australia) Candy	6	6	0
14	(Sweden) Lundqvist	4	2	0^{r}
(Denmark) Nielsen	2	3	2
(Brazil) Mandarino	6	6	6
(Poland) Skonecki
3	(Spain) Gimeno

Third round
(New Zealand) Gerrard	1	2	2
(Australia) Candy	6	6	6
(Brazil) Mandarino	7	6	1	1
3	(Spain) Gimeno	9	3	6	6

Fourth round
(Australia) Candy	2	3	4
3	(Spain) Gimeno	6	6	6

==== Section 7 ====
First round

Second round
(Australia) Mark	6	6	3	2	3
(Brazil) Barnes	4	2	6	6	6
(South Africa) Segal	4	2	3
10	(France) Haillet	6	6	6
(Italy) Tacchini	7	1	4	2
(West Germany) Stuck	5	6	6	6
(Austria) Hainka
7	(United Kingdom) Davies

Third round
(Brazil) Barnes	1	0	4
10	(France) Haillet	6	6	6
(West Germany) Stuck
(Austria) Hainka

Fourth round
10	(France) Haillet	6	6	6
(West Germany) Stuck	4	2	0

==== Section 8 ====
First round

Second round
(Denmark) Ulrich	6	6	6
(Chile) Aguirre	4	2	4
(West Germany) Bungert	8	2	3	2
15	(United Kingdom) Knight	6	6	6	6
(Hungary) Gulyás	7	6	6
(United Kingdom) Barrett	5	2	0
(Spain) Couder	1	6	2	6	1
2	(Australia) Fraser	6	2	6	4	6

Third round
(Denmark) Ulrich	0	3	6	1
15	(United Kingdom) Knight	6	6	4	6
(Hungary) Gulyás	2	0	10
2	(Australia) Fraser	6	6	12

Fourth round
15	(United Kingdom) Knight	1	6	6	3	0
2	(Australia) Fraser	6	1	4	6	6

Preceded by 1960 Australian Championships – Men's singles	Grand Slam men's singles	Succeeded by 1960 Wimbledon Championships – Men's singles
