= 1960 Wimbledon Championships – Men's singles =

Men's singles
- 1960 Wimbledon Championships

Final
- Champion: (Australia) Neale Fraser
- Runner-up: (Australia) Rod Laver
- Score: 6–4, 3–6, 9–7, 7–5

Details
- Draw: 128 (10Q)
- Seeds: 8

Events
Singles	men	women		boys	girls
Doubles	men	women	mixed	boys	girls
← 1959 ·	Wimbledon Championships	· 1961 →

Neale Fraser defeated Rod Laver in the final, 6–4, 3–6, 9–7, 7–5, to win the gentlemen's singles tennis title at the 1960 Wimbledon Championships. Alex Olmedo was the defending champion, but was ineligible to compete after turning professional.

== Seeds ==
1. (Australia) Neale Fraser (champion)
2. (United States) Barry MacKay (quarterfinals)
3. (Australia) Rod Laver (final)
4. (Chile) Luis Ayala (quarterfinals)
5. (Italy) Nicola Pietrangeli (semifinals)
6. (Australia) Roy Emerson (quarterfinals)
7. (India) Ramanathan Krishnan (semifinals)
8. (United States) Butch Buchholz (quarterfinals)

Click on the seed number of a player to go to their draw section.

== Draw ==
Key

- Q = Qualifier
- WC = Wild card
- LL = Lucky loser
- Alt = Alternate
- ITF = ITF entry
- PR = Protected ranking
- SR = Special ranking
- SE = Special exempt
- JE = Junior exempt
- JR = Junior Accelerator Programme entrant
- CO = College Accelerator Programme entrant
- NG = Next Gen Accelerator Program entrant
- w/o = Walkover
- r = Retired
- d = Defaulted

=== Finals ===
Quarterfinals
2	(United States) Barry MacKay	14	2	6	4
5	(Italy) Nicola Pietrangeli	16	6	3	6
3	(Australia) Rod Laver	6	5	6	6
6	(Australia) Roy Emerson	4	7	4	4
7	(India) Ramanathan Krishnan	7	10	6
4	(Chile) Luis Ayala	5	8	2
8	(United States) Butch Buchholz	6	3	6	15^{r}
1	(Australia) Neale Fraser	4	6	4	15

Semifinals
5	(Italy) Nicola Pietrangeli	6	3	10	2	4
3	(Australia) Rod Laver	4	6	8	6	6
7	(India) Ramanathan Krishnan	3	2	2
1	(Australia) Neale Fraser	6	6	6

Final
3	(Australia) Rod Laver	4	6	7	5
1	(Australia) Neale Fraser	6	3	9	7

=== Top half ===
==== Section 1 ====
First round
2	(United States) Barry MacKay	6	6	7
(Spain) José Luis Arilla	2	4	5
(Federation of Rhodesia and Nyasaland) Adrian Bey	6	6	6
(United States) Pablo Eisenberg	4	4	4
(Sweden) Ulf Schmidt	6	6	6
(Republic of Ireland) Guy Jackson	1	2	2
(Norway) Finn Søhol	2	5	4
(France) Jean-Claude Molinari	6	7	6
(Colombia) William Álvarez	4	6	4	4
(United Kingdom) Geoffrey Paish	6	3	6	6
(South Africa) Gaetan Koenig	1	2	3
(Denmark) Jørgen Ulrich	6	6	6
(Mexico) Rafael Osuna	6	6	6
(Netherlands) Pieter van Eijsden	1	3	4
(New Zealand) Lew Gerrard	6	6	6
(Socialist Federal Republic of Yugoslavia) Ivko Plećević	2	0	2

Second round
2	(United States) B MacKay	6	8	6
(Federation of Rhodesia and Nyasaland) A Bey	2	6	4
(Sweden) U Schmidt	4	6	7	6
(France) J-C Molinari	6	4	5	2
(United Kingdom) G Paish	5	6	1	3
(Denmark) J Ulrich	7	3	6	6
(Mexico) R Osuna	6	8	6
(New Zealand) L Gerrard	4	6	2

Third round
2	(United States) B MacKay	6	6	11
(Sweden) U Schmidt	4	3	9
(Denmark) J Ulrich	9	7	4	6
(Mexico) R Osuna	7	5	6	1

Fourth round
2	(United States) B MacKay	6	6	8
(Denmark) J Ulrich	2	2	6

==== Section 2 ====
First round
5	(Italy) Nicola Pietrangeli	6	9	6
(United States) Budge Patty	3	7	3
(Australia) Martin Mulligan	6	6	6
(India) Jaidip Mukerjea	3	4	2
(United Kingdom) Bobby Wilson	6	6	6
(Brazil) Ronnie Barnes	2	3	3
(Poland) Andrzej Licis	9	1	6	6	4
(Chile) Patricio Rodríguez	11	6	1	1	6
(Hungary) István Gulyás	6	6	6
(Argentina) Roberto Aubone	3	3	4
(West Germany) Wilhelm Bungert	5	13	6	6
Q	(Australia) John O'Brien	7	11	4	4
(United Kingdom) Colin Baxter	2	4	1
(United States) Jack Frost	6	6	6
(Mexico) Alfonso Ochoa	6	1	4	1
(Finland) Reino Nyyssönen	3	6	6	6

Second round
5	(Italy) N Pietrangeli	6	6	9
(Australia) M Mulligan	1	4	7
(United Kingdom) R Wilson	6	6	7
(Chile) P Rodríguez	2	0	5
(Hungary) I Gulyás	11	6	6
(West Germany) W Bungert	9	4	3
(United States) J Frost	6	6	6	8
(Finland) R Nyyssönen	3	3	8	6

Third round
5	(Italy) N Pietrangeli	6	4	13	6	6
(United Kingdom) R Wilson	2	6	11	8	3
(Hungary) I Gulyás	5	4	4
(United States) J Frost	7	6	6

Fourth round
5	(Italy) N Pietrangeli	6	6	6
(United States) J Frost	4	1	2

==== Section 3 ====
First round
3	(Australia) Rod Laver	6	6	6
(United Kingdom) Geoff Ward	3	0	2
(Australia) Neville Nette	3	4	6	4
(United States) Herbie Flam	6	6	2	6
(Austria) Franz Saiko	3	6	4	4
(Australia) Alan Lane	6	1	6	6
(Spain) Manuel Santana	6	6	6
(Sweden) Staffan Stockenberg	2	3	2
(Australia) Fred Stolle	6	4	3
(France) Pierre Darmon	8	6	6
(United States) Chuck McKinley	7	6	6	6
Q	(India) Arcot Udaykumar	9	0	2	2
(United Arab Republic) Fathi Ali	1	2	1
Q	(New Zealand) John McDonald	6	6	6
(United Kingdom) Mike Sangster	6	6	6
(United Kingdom) Gerry Oakley	4	4	4

Second round
3	(Australia) R Laver	6	6	6
(United States) H Flam	2	2	2
(Australia) A Lane	3	7	12	4	6
(Spain) M Santana	6	5	10	6	8
(France) P Darmon	6	6	3	4	6
(United States) C McKinley	4	2	6	6	1
Q	(New Zealand) J McDonald	4	3	6	5
(United Kingdom) M Sangster	6	6	2	7

Third round
3	(Australia) R Laver	3	6	6	6
(Spain) M Santana	6	1	4	4
(France) P Darmon	6	8	6
(United Kingdom) M Sangster	1	6	2

Fourth round
3	(Australia) R Laver	6	2	6	8
(France) P Darmon	2	6	1	6

==== Section 4 ====
First round
6	(Australia) Roy Emerson	6	6	6
(Denmark) Torben Ulrich	1	4	4
(Czechoslovakia) Jiří Javorský	7	6	4	6	6
(Soviet Union) Mikhail Mozer	9	3	6	2	3
(West Germany) Christian Kuhnke	8	3	6	5
Q	(Socialist Federal Republic of Yugoslavia) Nikola Pilić	10	6	0	7
(United States) Jon Douglas	7	5	7	4	2
(New Zealand) Mark Otway	5	7	5	6	6
(South Africa) Abe Segal	9	6	4	3
(United Kingdom) Roger Becker	11	3	6	6
(Italy) Giuseppe Merlo	6	6	6
(Belgium) Jacques Brichant	3	4	3
(Australia) Warren Woodcock	6	6	6
(United Kingdom) Michael Hann	2	2	2
(Australia) Barry Phillips-Moore	5	6	5	6	1
(Mexico) Mario Llamas	7	2	7	3	6

Second round
6	(Australia) R Emerson	4	1	6	6	6
(Czechoslovakia) J Javorský	6	6	1	0	3
Q	(Socialist Federal Republic of Yugoslavia) N Pilić	6	3	2
(New Zealand) M Otway	8	6	6
(United Kingdom) R Becker	4	3	9	6	6
(Italy) G Merlo	6	6	7	3	2
(Australia) W Woodcock	3	5	2
(Mexico) M Llamas	6	7	6

Third round
6	(Australia) R Emerson	13	4	6	7
(New Zealand) M Otway	11	6	3	5
(United Kingdom) R Becker	2	4	6	6
(Mexico) M Llamas	6	6	4	8

Fourth round
6	(Australia) R Emerson	2	6	6	9
(Mexico) M Llamas	6	0	2	7

=== Bottom half ===
==== Section 5 ====
First round
(South Africa) Rod Mandelstam	6	6	6
Q	(United Kingdom) Charlie Applewhaite	3	0	2
(South Africa) Ian Vermaak	4	8	6	6
(United States) Frank Froehling	6	6	3	4
(Australia) Bob Hewitt	6	6	6
(New Zealand) Brian Woolf	4	4	4
(France) Robert Haillet	6	6	2	3	7
Q	(United Kingdom) Roger Taylor	4	4	6	6	5
(West Germany) Wolfgang Stuck	3	7	6	6
(United Kingdom) Jaroslav Drobný	6	5	1	2
(Austria) Ladislav Legenstein	6	5	6	4	3
(Brazil) Carlos Fernandes	4	7	3	6	6
(United States) Butch Krikorian	3	2	6
(Spain) Andrés Gimeno	6	6	8
Q	(Australia) John Hillebrand	4	3	6	6	1
7	(India) Ramanathan Krishnan	6	6	2	3	6

Second round
(South Africa) R Mandelstam	7	3	5	5
(South Africa) I Vermaak	5	6	7	7
(Australia) R Hewitt	9	6	6
(France) R Haillet	7	3	4
(West Germany) W Stuck	7	6	7
(Brazil) C Fernandes	5	1	5
(Spain) A Gimeno	6	3	0	6	3
7	(India) R Krishnan	2	6	6	2	6

Third round
(South Africa) I Vermaak	6	6	3	6
(Australia) R Hewitt	4	4	6	1
(West Germany) W Stuck	0	1	1
7	(India) R Krishnan	6	6	6

Fourth round
(South Africa) I Vermaak	6	6	0	7	2
7	(India) R Krishnan	3	8	6	5	6

==== Section 6 ====
First round
(Sweden) Jan-Erik Lundqvist	2	1	6	6	6
(Australia) Bob Howe	6	6	3	3	3
(Norway) Thorvald Moe	3	2	4
(United States) Dennis Ralston	6	6	6
(United States) Ronnie Holmberg	6	6	3	8
(Denmark) Kurt Nielsen	4	8	6	10
(Mexico) Antonio Palafox	3	12	2	5
(United Kingdom) Billy Knight	6	10	6	7
(Australia) Will Coghlan	6	4	6	6	5
(United Kingdom) Alan Mills	4	6	3	8	7
LL	(Socialist Federal Republic of Yugoslavia) Vladimir Presečki	2	1	3
(Australia) John Pearce	6	6	6
(United Kingdom) John Ward	1	6	5	6	6
(Italy) Sergio Tacchini	6	4	7	4	8
Q	(South Africa) Robin Sanders	7	2	6
4	(Chile) Luis Ayala	9	6	8

Second round
(Sweden) J-E Lundqvist	6	6	9
(United States) D Ralston	4	1	7
(Denmark) K Nielsen	2	6	2	11	6
(United Kingdom) W Knight	6	4	6	9	3
(United Kingdom) A Mills	3	6	10	6
(Australia) J Pearce	6	0	8	3
(Italy) S Tacchini	1	1	3
4	(Chile) L Ayala	6	6	6

Third round
(Sweden) J-E Lundqvist	13	6	4	4	9
(Denmark) K Nielsen	11	1	6	6	7
(United Kingdom) A Mills	7^{r}
4	(Chile) L Ayala	8

Fourth round
(Sweden) J-E Lundqvist	11	6	1	8	4
4	(Chile) L Ayala	9	0	6	10	6

==== Section 7 ====
First round
(United Arab Republic) Mohamed Badreldin-Sayed	3	2	4
(France) Jean-Noël Grinda	6	6	6
(United States) Hugh Ditzler	3	3	6	3
(United States) Malcolm Fox	6	6	3	6
(Mexico) Francisco Contreras	5	6	6	6
(Denmark) Jan Leschly	7	4	3	2
Q	(Sweden) Christer Holm	4	0	4
(South Africa) Bertie Gaertner	6	6	6
(India) Naresh Kumar	0	2	1
(Australia) Bob Mark	6	6	6
(United States) Clifton Mayne	6	7	4	5
(Socialist Federal Republic of Yugoslavia) Boro Jovanović	8	5	6	7
(United Kingdom) John Barrett	2	4	1
(United States) John Cranston	6	6	6
(Spain) Juan Manuel Couder	3	7	6	2
8	(United States) Butch Buchholz	6	9	2	6

Second round
(France) J-N Grinda	6	6	6
(United States) M Fox	0	1	2
(Mexico) F Contreras	1	6	2
(South Africa) A Gaertner	6	8	6
(Australia) R Mark	8	6	6
(Socialist Federal Republic of Yugoslavia) B Jovanović	6	3	0
(United States) J Cranston	4	3	1
8	(United States) E Buchholz	6	6	6

Third round
(France) J-N Grinda	3	6	6	4
(South Africa) A Gaertner	6	3	8	6
(Australia) R Mark	4	13	5
8	(United States) E Buchholz	6	15	7

Fourth round
(South Africa) A Gaertner	2	4	5
8	(United States) E Buchholz	6	6	7

==== Section 8 ====
First round
(United States) Gardnar Mulloy	7	6	15	6
(United Kingdom) Tony Pickard	5	4	17	3
(United Kingdom) Mike Davies	6	6	6	6
Q	(United Kingdom) Peter Moys	4	8	4	2
(United States) Bobby Siska	6	3	1	1
(Australia) Don Candy	2	6	6	6
(West Germany) Ingo Buding	6	6	1	1
(Italy) Orlando Sirola	0	8	6	6
(Poland) Wiesław Gąsiorek	2	3	4
(Soviet Union) Toomas Leius	6	6	6
(South Africa) John Hammill	6	3	11	6	8
(West Germany) Dieter Ecklebe	2	6	13	3	10
(Netherlands) Willem Maris	6	6	2	6
(Brazil) José Edison Mandarino	4	3	6	4
(Austria) Franz Hainka	2	0	4
1	(Australia) Neale Fraser	6	6	6

Second round
(United States) G Mulloy	6	6	6
(United Kingdom) M Davies	3	3	4
(Australia) D Candy	4	8	6	6	7
(Italy) O Sirola	6	10	4	4	5
(Soviet Union) T Leius	4	8	9	6
(West Germany) D Ecklebe	6	6	7	4
(Netherlands) W Maris	2	3	2
1	(Australia) N Fraser	6	6	6

Third round
(United States) G Mulloy	4	5	6	2
(Australia) D Candy	6	7	3	6
(Soviet Union) T Leius	4	1	8	3
1	(Australia) N Fraser	6	6	6	6

Fourth round
(Australia) D Candy	2	3	2
1	(Australia) N Fraser	6	6	6

Preceded by 1960 French Championships	Grand Slams; Men's Singles	Succeeded by 1960 U.S. Championships
