= 1959 French Championships – Men's singles =

Men's singles
- 1959 French Championships

Final
- Champion: (Italy) Nicola Pietrangeli
- Runner-up: (South Africa) Ian Vermaak
- Score: 3–6, 6–3, 6–4, 6–1

Details
- Draw: 86
- Seeds: 16

Events
Singles	men	women
Doubles	men	women
- French Championships

Third-seeded Nicola Pietrangeli defeated Ian Vermaak 3–6, 6–3, 6–4, 6–1 in the final to win the men's singles tennis title at the 1959 French Championships.

== Seeds ==
The seeded players are listed below. Nicola Pietrangeli is the champion; others show the round in which they were eliminated.

1. (Chile) Luis Ayala (semifinals)
2. (Australia) Neale Fraser (semifinals)
3. (Italy) Nicola Pietrangeli (champion)
4. (South Africa) Ian Vermaak (final)
5. (Belgium) Jacques Brichant (quarterfinals)
6. (France) Pierre Darmon (first round)
7. (United States) Jon Douglas (third round)
8. (United States) Budge Patty (third round)
9. (Australia) Roy Emerson (quarterfinals)
10. (United Arab Republic) Jaroslav Drobný (fourth round)
11. (United Kingdom) Billy Knight (quarterfinals)
12. (Italy) Orlando Sirola (third round)
13. (Australia) Rod Laver (third round)
14. (Australia) Martin Mulligan (quarterfinals)
15. (New Zealand) Lew Gerrard (fourth round)
16. (Italy) Giuseppe Merlo (fourth round)

== Draw ==
=== Key ===
- Q = Qualifier
- WC = Wild card
- LL = Lucky loser
- r = Retired

=== Finals ===
Quarterfinals
1	(Chile) Luis Ayala	1	6	6	6
9	(Australia) Roy Emerson	6	4	4	3
(South Africa) Ian Vermaak	4	2	6	6	6
5	(Belgium) Jacques Brichant	6	6	4	3	4
11	(United Kingdom) Billy Knight	1	2	1
3	(Italy) Nicola Pietrangeli	6	6	6
(Australia) Martin Mulligan	4	6	1
2	(Australia) Neale Fraser	6	8	6

Semifinals
1	(Chile) Luis Ayala	2	1	4
(South Africa) Ian Vermaak	6	6	6
3	(Italy) Nicola Pietrangeli	7	6	7
2	(Australia) Neale Fraser	5	3	5

Final
(South Africa) Ian Vermaak	6	3	4	1
3	(Italy) Nicola Pietrangeli	3	6	6	6

=== Earlier rounds ===
==== Section 1 ====
First round

Second round
1	(Chile) Ayala
(Denmark) Hojberg
(New Zealand) Otway	5	7	6	7	6
(Morocco) Lahcen Chaldi	7	9	2	5	1
16	(Italy) Merlo	6	6	6
(Australia) Candy	1	2	2
(Australia) Fletcher	10	5	4
(France) Grinda	12	7	6

Third round
1	(Chile) Ayala	6	6	6
(New Zealand) Otway	4	4	3
16	(Italy) Merlo	4	8	6	6
(France) Grinda	6	6	1	2

Fourth round
1	(Chile) Ayala	6	4	2	6	6
16	(Italy) Merlo	2	6	6	2	3

==== Section 2 ====
First round

Second round
8	(United States) Patty	6	6	6
(India) Kumar	0	4	2
(Sweden) Lundqvist	6	6	6
(Chile) Achondo	1	4	3
9	(Australia) Emerson	6	6	6
(New Zealand) Woolf	3	2	4
(Australia) Kendall	3	3	4
(France) Molinari	6	6	6

Third round
8	(United States) Patty	6	6	1	2
(Sweden) Lundqvist	0	8	6	6
9	(Australia) Emerson	6	4	4	6	6
(France) Molinari	4	6	6	3	4

Fourth round
(Sweden) Lundqvist	4	6	5	2
9	(Australia) Emerson	6	4	7	6

==== Section 3 ====
First round
(Netherlands) van Eijsden	2	1	2
(South Africa) Weedon	6	6	6
(United States) Frost	6	6	6
(Czechoslovakia) Schonborn	3	2	4
(France) Viron	6	6	2	1
(Austria) Legenstein	8	4	6	6

Second round
(France) Haillet	6	6	6
(France) Matton	1	0	2
(South Africa) Vermaak	6	6	6
(France) Renavand	3	2	4
13	(Australia) Laver	6	4	6	8
(South Africa) Weedon	2	6	1	6
(United States) Frost	5	6	3	2
(Austria) Legenstein	7	4	6	6

Third round
(France) Haillet	2	6	4	6	2
(South Africa) Vermaak	6	1	6	3	6
13	(Australia) Laver	4	6	6	5	4
(Austria) Legenstein	6	4	2	7	6

Fourth round
(South Africa) Vermaak	6	6	6
(Austria) Legenstein	1	3	3

==== Section 4 ====
First round
5	(Belgium) Brichant	6	6	6
(France) De Kermadec	1	2	3
(France) Deniau	6	4	1	6	3
(Hungary) Ádám-Stolpa	1	6	6	4	6
(South Africa) Segal	7	6	2	6
(South Africa) Mandelstam	5	1	6	3
(Brazil) Fernandes	7	6	2	6
(Australia) Hewitt	5	1	6	3
12	(Italy) Sirola	6	6	6
(United Kingdom) Pickard	1	4	4
(Brazil) Mandarino	6	6	2	3	6
(Netherlands) Maris	2	0	6	6	8
(Sweden) Johansson	6	6	2	1	2
(Germany) Ecklebe	0	3	6	6	6
(Australia) Jacques	1	4	4
(Denmark) Nielsen	6	6	6

Second round
5	(Belgium) Brichant	6	8	6
(Hungary) Ádám-Stolpa	3	6	2
(South Africa) Segal	7	4	6	3
(Brazil) Fernandes	9	6	3	6
12	(Italy) Sirola	5	7	11	6
(Netherlands) Maris	7	5	9	4
(Germany) Ecklebe	2	3	4
(Denmark) Nielsen	6	6	6

Third round
5	(Belgium) Brichant	8	7	6
(Brazil) Fernandes	6	5	3
12	(Italy) Sirola	2	3	4
(Denmark) Nielsen	6	6	6

Fourth round
5	(Belgium) Brichant	6	6	6
(Denmark) Nielsen	0	1	4

==== Section 5 ====
First round
(Australia) Mark	6	6	3	3	6
(France) Jalabert	1	2	6	6	1
(Mexico) Contreras	6	8	6
(Socialist Federal Republic of Yugoslavia) Nikolic	4	6	3
(Chile) Rodríguez	6	3	6	0	6
(France) Perreau-Saussine	3	6	4	6	4
(Poland) Licis
11	(United Kingdom) Knight
(Socialist Federal Republic of Yugoslavia) Panajotovic	6	7	7	5
(France) Lasry	0	9	9	7
(Germany) Bungert	7	6	10	6	2
(Brazil) Barnes	5	3	12	8	6
(Chile) Aguirre	0	2	4
(Hungary) Jancsó	6	6	6
(Czechoslovakia) Javorský	6	4	2	6	11
6	(France) Darmon	4	6	6	3	9

Second round
(Australia) Mark	3	6	2	1
(Mexico) Contreras	6	4	6	6
(Chile) Rodríguez	6	2	1
11	(United Kingdom) Knight	8	6	6
(France) Lasry	6	2	4	3
(Brazil) Barnes	3	6	6	6
(Hungary) Jancsó	3	2	6	2
(Czechoslovakia) Javorský	6	6	4	6

Third round
(Mexico) Contreras	1	2	6	6	2
11	(United Kingdom) Knight	6	6	4	2	6
(Brazil) Barnes	0	6	9	5
(Czechoslovakia) Javorský	6	3	11	7

Fourth round
11	(United Kingdom) Knight	6	7	3	6
(Czechoslovakia) Javorský	4	5	6	1

==== Section 6 ====
First round
(Socialist Federal Republic of Yugoslavia) Jovanović
(Colombia) Álvarez
(France) Bresson	6	3	2	0	r
(Denmark) Ulrich	1	6	6	2
(Australia) Woodcock	6	6	6
(France) Vincent	2	1	2

Second round
(Colombia) Álvarez	11	5	6	5	0
(Denmark) Ulrich	9	7	4	7	6
(Australia) Woodcock	6	6	6	6	3
(South Africa) Forbes	8	3	0	8	6
(Spain) Couder	2	6	8	6
(South Africa) Fancutt	6	4	6	1
(Mexico) Llamas	3	6	5	2
3	(Italy) Pietrangeli	6	3	7	6

Third round
(Denmark) Ulrich	3	8	6	6	6
(South Africa) Forbes	6	10	2	1	1
(Spain) Couder	3	2	2
3	(Italy) Pietrangeli	6	6	6

Fourth round
(Denmark) Ulrich	5	3	4
3	(Italy) Pietrangeli	7	6	6

==== Section 7 ====
First round

Second round
(Sweden) Schmidt	6	3	4
(Poland) Skonecki	8	6	6
(France) Grandet	0	3	6
10	(United Arab Republic) Drobný	6	6	8
(Socialist Federal Republic of Yugoslavia) Keretic	1	5	1
(Australia) Mulligan	6	7	6
(Colombia) Salas
7	(United States) Douglas

Third round
(Poland) Skonecki	5	1	3
10	(United Arab Republic) Drobný	7	6	6
(Australia) Mulligan	2	6	6	6
7	(United States) Douglas	6	3	3	1

Fourth round
10	(United Arab Republic) Drobný	4	6	4	3
(Australia) Mulligan	6	3	6	6

==== Section 8 ====
First round

Second round
(France) Pilet	6	2	2	6	6
(Mexico) Palafox	2	6	6	3	0
(France) Nys	4	3	2
15	(New Zealand) Gerrard	6	6	6
(Australia) Gorman	3	4	6	4
(United Kingdom) Mills	6	6	4	6
(Hungary) Gulyás
2	(Australia) Fraser

Third round
(France) Pilet	6	6	6	3	4
15	(New Zealand) Gerrard	1	4	4	6	6
(United Kingdom) Mills	4	6	8
2	(Australia) Fraser	6	8	10

Fourth round
15	(New Zealand) Gerrard	3	0	0
2	(Australia) Fraser	6	6	6

Preceded by 1959 Australian Championships – Men's singles	Grand Slam men's singles	Succeeded by 1959 Wimbledon Championships – Men's singles
