= Turkey Open =

Defunct tennis tournament
- Tour: ILTF Asian Circuit (1942–73); Grand Prix tennis circuit(1975)
- Founded: 1942
- Abolished: 1975
- Location: Istanbul, Turkey
- Surface: Clay

The Turkey Open originally known as the Turkey International Championships also known as the Istanbul International Championships is a defunct tennis tournament that was played on outdoor clay courts, Istanbul, Turkey. The event was part of the men's amateur tennis tour (1947–1967) with the advent of the Open Era it was part of the non-aligned tour circuit of the ITF, between 1968 and 1973. In 1975 the final year it was staged it became part of the Grand Prix tennis circuit.

== History ==
The Turkey Open was originally established on 10 July 1942 as the Turkey International Championships and also called the Istanbul International Championships until 1967. From 1942 until 1973 the event was part of the ILTF Asian Circuit, no event was staged in 1974 however in its final year 1975 it was very briefly a part of the men's Grand Prix tennis circuit. The event was played on outdoor clay courts. The tournament featured both singles and doubles play.

== Past finals ==
Past singles champions have included:

=== Men's singles ===
Year	Champions	Runners-up	Score
1942	(Germany) Engelbert Koch	(Austria) Kurt Egert	4–6, 6–2, 6–2, 7–5
1947	(Czechoslovakia) Vojtech Vadika	(Turkey) Fehmi Kizil	2–6, 6–2, 0–6, 6–3, 6–4
1948	(Argentina) Heraldo Weiss	(Austria) Hans Redl	1–6, 1–6, 6–4, 6–0, 6–4
1949	(Australia) Jack Harper	(West Germany) Gottfried von Cramm	6–4, 4–6, 4–6, 9–7, 6–2
1950	(Italy) Gianni Cucelli	(United States) Fred Kovaleski	7–5, 6–2, 2–6, 2–1, ret.
1951	(Philippines) Felicisimo Ampon	(Italy) Gianni Cucelli	6–2, 6–1, 9–7
1952	(United States) Budge Patty	(Brazil) Armando Vieira	8–6, 6–2, 6–3
1953	(France) Paul Rémy	(Italy) Giuseppe Merlo	6–4, 6–4, 4–6, 2–6, 6–4
1954	(Poland) Władysław Skonecki	(Italy) Orlando Sirola	1–6, 4–6, 6–2, 6–3, 6–0
1955	(Sweden) Sven Davidson	(Australia) Mervyn Rose	8–6, 6–0, 4–6, 6–1
1956	(Sweden) Sven Davidson	(United States) Budge Patty	11–9, 8–6, 6–1
1957	(Chile) Luis Ayala	(Mexico) Francisco Contreras	4–6, 6–4, 6–4
1958	(Chile) Luis Ayala	(Mexico) Francisco Contreras	6–2, 6–3, 6–4
1959	(Chile) Luis Ayala	(South Africa) Raymond Weedon	6–4, 6–0, 6–2
1960	(South Africa) Ian Vermaak	(Denmark) Jørgen Ulrich	6–4, 6–1, 11-9
1961	(South Africa) Bob Hewitt	(Australia) Ken Fletcher	6–3, 6–3, 9–7
1962	(Australia) Roy Emerson	(Australia) Neale Fraser	3–6, 6–0, 6–3, 6–3
1963	(Australia) Roy Emerson	(United Kingdom) Mike Sangster	8–10, 6–2, 6–2, 6–1
1964	(Brazil) Ron Barnes	(United States) Allen Fox	7–5, 6–4, 4–6, 6–2
1965	(Brazil) Ron Barnes	(South Africa) Cliff Drysdale	6–0, 6–4, 5–7, 1–6, 6–4
1966	(South Africa) Frew McMillan	(Brazil) Ron Barnes	7–5, 7–5, 6–2
1967	(Brazil) José Edison Mandarino	(Brazil) Thomaz Koch	6–4, 6–4, 6–2
Open era
1968	(United Kingdom) Mark Cox	(Chile) Patricio Rodríguez	6–3, 6–3, 2–6, 6–4
1969	(South Africa) Bob Hewitt	(South Africa) Robert Maud	6-3 8-6 6-1
1970	(South Africa) Bob Hewitt	(Socialist Federal Republic of Yugoslavia) Željko Franulović	2–6, 3–6, 6–2, 7–5, 6–4
1971	(Romania) Ilie Năstase	(South Africa) Andrew Pattison	6–4, 6–4, 11-9
1972	(Spain) Juan Gisbert Sr.	(South Africa) Byron Bertram	6–1, 6–1, 7–5
1973	(Romania) Ilie Năstase	(Spain) Juan Gisbert Sr.	6–2, 3–6, 6–3, 6–2
1974	Not held		
1975	(Rhodesia) Colin Dowdeswell	(United States) Ferdi Taygan	6–1, 6–4, 6–2

=== Doubles ===
Year	Champion	Runner-up	Score
1975	(Australia) Colin Dibley (Brazil) Thomaz Koch	(Rhodesia) Colin Dowdeswell (United Kingdom) John Feaver	6–2, 6–2, 6–2

== See also ==
- Istanbul Open
- Category:National and multi-national tennis tournaments

== Sources ==
- Tennis Base Turkey Open: Tournament Roll of Honour
- Singles draw
- Doubles draw
- ITF archives
