= Bertie Gaertner =

South African tennis player (1939–1996)

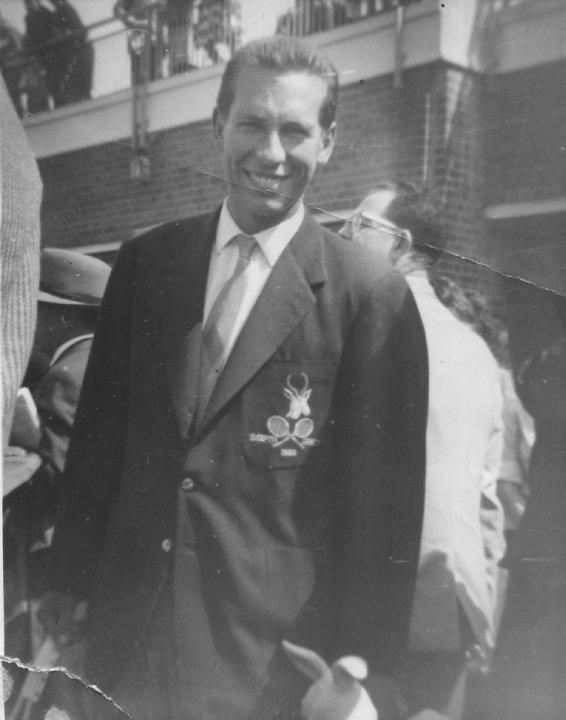
- Full name: Albert Gaertner
- Country (sports): South Africa
- Born: 9 March 1939 Egypt
- Died: 9 August 1996 (aged 57)

Singles

Grand Slam singles results
- French Open: 2R (1961)
- Wimbledon: 4R (1960)

Doubles

Grand Slam doubles results
- French Open: 3R (1960, 1961)
- Wimbledon: QF (1960)

Grand Slam mixed doubles results
- French Open: QF (1961)
- Wimbledon: QF (1958)

Albert "Bertie" Gaertner (9 March 1939 – 9 August 1996) was a South African tennis player.

== Biography ==
Born in Egypt, Gaertner was the son of a German father and had mixed English and Turkish ancestry on his mother's side. He moved to Cape Town at some time during the 1950s.

Gaertner won the Hoylake Open Championship singles title in 1960. He was a Wimbledon quarter-finalist in both the men's and mixed doubles events while competing on tour. His best singles performance was a run to the fourth round of the 1960 Wimbledon Championships. He featured on the South Africa Davis Cup team during the early 1960s, registering a singles win over Ion Țiriac in 1960, then helping them to the Europe Zone quarter-finals the following year.

Later in life, Gaertner and wife Meg resided for many years at "The Old Barn" in Great Haseley, Oxfordshire.

== See also ==
- List of South Africa Davis Cup team representatives
