= 1962 Davis Cup =

1962 edition of the Davis Cup

Details
- Duration: 31 March – 28 December 1962
- Edition: 51st
- Teams: 42

Champion
- Winning nation: Australia

The 1962 Davis Cup was the 51st edition of the Davis Cup, the most important tournament between national teams in men's tennis. 28 teams entered the Europe Zone, 8 teams entered the Eastern Zone, and 5 teams entered the America Zone. Iran and the Soviet Union made their first appearances in the tournament.

Mexico defeated Yugoslavia in the America Zone final, India defeated the Philippines in the Eastern Zone final, and Sweden defeated Italy in the Europe Zone final. In the Inter-Zonal Zone, Mexico defeated Sweden in the semifinal, and then defeated India in the final. Mexico were then defeated by the defending champions Australia in the Challenge Round. The final was played at the Milton Courts in Brisbane, Australia on 26–28 December. It was Mexico's first appearance in a Davis Cup final.

== America Zone ==
=== Draw ===
Quarterfinals; 13–15 July
Cleveland, OH, United States (clay)
United States	5
Canada	0
Mexico
bye
bye
Caribbean/West Indies
bye
Yugoslavia

Semifinals; 4–8 August
Mexico City, Mexico (clay)
United States	2
Mexico	3
Port of Spain, Trinidad and Tobago (clay)
Caribbean/West Indies	1
Yugoslavia	4

Final; 17–19 August
Mexico City, Mexico (clay)
Mexico	4
Yugoslavia	1

=== Final ===
Mexico vs. Yugoslavia

Mexico
4
Centro Deportivo Chapultepec, Mexico City, Mexico
17–19 August 1962
Clay

Yugoslavia
1

			1	2	3	4	5
1	(Mexico) (Socialist Federal Republic of Yugoslavia)	Antonio Palafox; Boro Jovanović	6; 4	1; 6	6; 3	6; 3
2	(Mexico) (Socialist Federal Republic of Yugoslavia)	Rafael Osuna; Nikola Pilić	6; 4	6; 4	6; 2
3	(Mexico) (Socialist Federal Republic of Yugoslavia)	Rafael Osuna / Antonio Palafox; Boro Jovanović / Nikola Pilić	6; 4	2; 6	6; 3	7; 5
4	(Mexico) (Socialist Federal Republic of Yugoslavia)	Francisco Contreras; Nikola Pilić	2; 6	2; 6	7; 9
5	(Mexico) (Socialist Federal Republic of Yugoslavia)	Mario Llamas; Vladimir Presečki	6; 0	6; 1	6; 1

== Eastern Zone ==
=== Draw ===
Quarterfinals; 17 March–8 April
Lahore, Pakistan
India	5
Pakistan	0
Tehran, Iran
Iran	3
Malaya	2
Seoul, South Korea
South Korea	0
Japan	5
Colombo, Ceylon (clay)
Ceylon	0
Philippines	4

Semifinals; 13–16 April
Jaipur, India
India	4
Iran	0
Manila, Philippines
Japan	2
Philippines	3

Final; 4–6 May
New Delhi, India
India	5
Philippines	0

=== Final ===
India vs. Philippines

India
5
New Delhi, India
4–6 May 1962

Philippines
0

			1	2	3	4	5
1	(India) (Philippines)	Jaidip Mukerjea; Juan-Johnson José	9; 11	7; 5	6; 0	6; 4
2	(India) (Philippines)	Ramanathan Krishnan; Felicisimo Ampon	6; 1	8; 6	6; 1
3	(India) (Philippines)	Premjit Lall / Jaidip Mukerjea; Raymundo Deyro / Juan-Johnson José	6; 4	3; 6	9; 7	6; 1
4	(India) (Philippines)	Premjit Lall; Juan-Johnson José	6; 3	6; 1	6; 0
5	(India) (Philippines)	Jaidip Mukerjea; Felicisimo Ampon	6; 1	6; 3	3; 6	6; 1

== Europe Zone ==
=== Draw ===
First Round; 4–7 May
Italy
bye
Netherlands	0
Soviet Union	5
Hungary	5
Luxembourg	0
Denmark	4
New Zealand	1
Norway	0
Poland	5
Monaco	0
Brazil	5
Ireland	1
Austria	4
bye
Great Britain
France
bye
Switzerland	0
South Africa	4
Spain	2
West Germany	3
Romania	4
Israel	1
Lebanon	1
Finland	4
Czechoslovakia	4
Egypt	1
Belgium	4
Chile	1
bye
Sweden

Second Round; 18–21 May
Florence, Italy (clay)
Italy	5
Soviet Union	0
Budapest, Hungary (clay)
Hungary	5
Denmark	0
Warsaw, Poland
Poland	0
Brazil	3
Vienna, Austria (clay)
Austria	1
Great Britain	4
Paris, France (clay)
France	2
South Africa	3
Hanover, West Germany
West Germany	5
Romania	0
Helsinki, Finland
Finland	0
Czechoslovakia	5
Brussels, Belgium (clay)
Belgium	0
Sweden	5

Quarterfinals; 14–17 June
Brescia, Italy (clay)
Italy	4
Hungary	1
Eastbourne, England (grass)
Brazil	1
Great Britain	4
West Berlin
South Africa	3
West Germany	2
Stockholm, Sweden (clay)
Czechoslovakia	0
Sweden	5

Semifinals; 13–15 July
Milan, Italy (clay)
Italy	5
Great Britain	0
Båstad, Sweden (clay)
South Africa	1
Sweden	4

Final; 27–29 July
Båstad, Sweden (clay)
Italy	1
Sweden	4

=== Final ===
Sweden vs. Italy

Sweden
4
Båstad Tennis Stadium, Båstad, Sweden
27–29 July 1962
Clay

Italy
1

			1	2	3	4	5
1	(Sweden) (Italy)	Ulf Schmidt; Fausto Gardini	3; 6	6; 3	5; 7	3; 6
2	(Sweden) (Italy)	Jan-Erik Lundqvist; Nicola Pietrangeli	6; 2	6; 4	6; 1
3	(Sweden) (Italy)	Jan-Erik Lundqvist / Ulf Schmidt; Nicola Pietrangeli / Orlando Sirola	6; 1	3; 6	6; 8	6; 4	9; 7
4	(Sweden) (Italy)	Jan-Erik Lundqvist; Fausto Gardini	6; 0	6; 2	6; 1
5	(Sweden) (Italy)	Ulf Schmidt; Nicola Pietrangeli	6; 1	8; 6	6; 3

== Inter-Zonal Zone ==
=== Draw ===
Semifinals; 26–28 October
EAS	India
bye
Mexico City, Mexico (clay)
AME	Mexico	3
EUR	Sweden	2

Final; 3–5 December
Madras, India
EAS	India	0
AME	Mexico	5

=== Semifinals ===
Mexico vs. Sweden

Mexico
3
Centro Deportivo Chapultepec, Mexico City, Mexico
26–28 October 1962
Clay

Sweden
2

			1	2	3	4	5
1	(Mexico) (Sweden)	Antonio Palafox; Jan-Erik Lundqvist	6; 8	6; 1	6; 8	4; 6
2	(Mexico) (Sweden)	Rafael Osuna; Ulf Schmidt	6; 3	16; 14	1; 6	6; 2
3	(Mexico) (Sweden)	Rafael Osuna / Antonio Palafox; Jan-Erik Lundqvist / Ulf Schmidt	6; 8	7; 5	12; 10	6; 1
4	(Mexico) (Sweden)	Antonio Palafox; Ulf Schmidt	9; 11	6; 3	3; 6	6; 1	1; 6
5	(Mexico) (Sweden)	Rafael Osuna; Jan-Erik Lundqvist	3; 6	6; 4	6; 3	1; 6	6; 3

=== Final ===
India vs. Mexico

India
0
Madras, India
3–5 December 1962

Mexico
5

			1	2	3	4	5
1	(India) (Mexico)	Jaidip Mukerjea; Antonio Palafox	7; 9	2; 6	2; 6
2	(India) (Mexico)	Ramanathan Krishnan; Rafael Osuna	6; 8	6; 2	5; 7	8; 6	4; 6
3	(India) (Mexico)	Premjit Lall / Jaidip Mukerjea; Rafael Osuna / Antonio Palafox	8; 10	10; 12	4; 6
4	(India) (Mexico)	Premjit Lall; Mario Llamas	2; 6	2; 6	3; 6
5	(India) (Mexico)	Akhtar Ali; Francisco Contreras	4; 6	6; 2	7; 5	4; 6	3; 6

== Challenge Round ==
Australia vs. Mexico

Australia
5
Milton Courts, Brisbane, Australia
26–28 December 1962
Grass

Mexico
0

			1	2	3	4	5
1	(Australia) (Mexico)	Rod Laver; Rafael Osuna	6; 2	6; 1	7; 5
2	(Australia) (Mexico)	Neale Fraser; Antonio Palafox	7; 9	6; 2	6; 4	11; 9
3	(Australia) (Mexico)	Roy Emerson / Rod Laver; Rafael Osuna / Antonio Palafox	7; 5	6; 2	6; 4
4	(Australia) (Mexico)	Neale Fraser; Rafael Osuna	3; 6	11; 9	6; 1	3; 6	6; 4
5	(Australia) (Mexico)	Rod Laver; Antonio Palafox	6; 1	4; 6	6; 4	8; 6
