= Wolfgang Stuck =

West German tennis player (1939–2022)

- Country (sports): West Germany
- Born: 22 March 1939
- Died: 2 February 2022 (aged 82)
- Plays: Right-handed

Singles

Grand Slam singles results
- French Open: 4R (1960)
- Wimbledon: 3R (1960)

Wolfgang Stuck (22 March 1939 – 2 February 2022) was a German tennis player.

Stuck, one of the best clay court players of his time, was a member of LTTC Rot-Weiß in Berlin. He won West Germany's national outdoor championships back to back in 1959 and 1960, then claimed the indoor title in 1963. His career included a fourth round appearance at the 1960 French Championships and he registered multiple wins over the world's top amateur player Neale Fraser. He played Davis Cup for West Germany in 1960 and 1964.

== See also ==
- List of Germany Davis Cup team representatives
