= Sergio Tacchini =

Italian fashion designer

- Country (sports): Italy
- Born: 2 September 1938 (age 87)

Singles
- Career record: 7–17

Grand Slam singles results
- Australian Open: 2R (1961)
- French Open: 2R (1960, 1961)
- Wimbledon: 2R (1960, 1962, 1965)
- US Open: 3R (1966)

Doubles
- Career record: 1–2

Grand Slam doubles results
- Australian Open: 1R (1961)
- Wimbledon: 2R (1963)

Mixed doubles

Grand Slam mixed doubles results
- Wimbledon: 2R (1966)

Team competitions
- Davis Cup: F (1960^{Ch}, 1961^{Ch})

Sergio Tacchini (Italian: [ˈsɛrdʒo takˈkiːni]; born 2 September 1938) is an Italian former professional tennis player and fashion designer of sportswear. The sportswear firm bearing his name is located in Bellinzago Novarese, Novara, Italy.

== Tennis career ==
Sergio Tacchini became a professional tennis player at age 17 by entering the Tennis Club of Milan in 1955. In 1960 he won the title of the Italian Champion over Nicola Pietrangeli. He also competed in the Davis Cup, counting five victories in singles and one in doubles in a total of fifteen matches. He took another two Italian titles in doubles, with Pietrangeli as his partner, in 1967 and 1968.

== Business ==
Sergio Tacchini
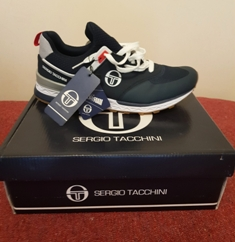
- Sergio Tacchini sneakers
- Formerly: Sandys S.p.A.
- Industry: Footwear; Apparel
- Founded: 1966; 60 years ago
- Number of locations: Over 100 (2011)
- Owner: Billy Ngok (from 2008)
- Website: sergiotacchini.com

In 1966, Sergio Tacchini founded Sandys S.p.A. which was to be renamed after Tacchini himself a few years later. The initial idea was to experiment with colours and fabrics to create elegant and stylish tenniswear, at a time when white dominated the players' clothes. However the project expanded to other sports such as ski, fitness, golf and sailing, as well as leisure wear. The mid-eighties saw Sergio Tacchini issue the "Dallas" tracksuit.

The firm went into bankruptcy in 2007 and was purchased in 2008 by Hong Kong Chinese businessman Billy Ngok, owner of Hembly International and associate of American businessman Ronald Burkle. In 2011, the firm's annual revenue was reported to be "less than €50 million (US$71 million)." A report at the time of the firm's purchase said the price was EUR27m (US$42.3m), and that Ngok "planned to open 120 shops in mainland China in the next three years." A 2011 report said the firm had "more than 100 Tacchini stores worldwide."

=== Sponsorships ===
Many athletes joined the Sergio Tacchini brand over the years. Most of them were well-known tennis players from the 1970s and 1980s such as Jimmy Connors, Vitas Gerulaitis, Ilie Năstase, Mats Wilander, John McEnroe, Martina Navratilova, Sergi Bruguera, Pat Cash, Gabriela Sabatini, Pete Sampras, and Martina Hingis. Goran Ivanišević was sponsored by the firm when he won Wimbledon in 2001 and Novak Djokovic was sponsored when he won the Australian Open for the second time, and Wimbledon, in 2011. The firm has also sponsored the 1983 Italian basketball team in the European Cup, the skiers Pirmin Zurbriggen and Marc Girardelli, Formula 1 drivers such as Ayrton Senna and Carlos Reutemann and the golfer Ian Woosnam.

In the 1980s, Tacchini and Fila led in tennis sponsorship, but in the late 1980s and early 1990s, Nike and Adidas moved into, and took the lead in, sponsoring the top athletes in the sport.

At present, sponsored athletes include sailor Karine Fauconnier (Transat Jacques Vabre and Single-Handed Trans-Atlantic Race) and English cricketer Ian Bell.

Djokovic signed a 10-year deal with Tacchini in November 2009. At the time of signing, he was fourth in the ATP rankings and had won only one Grand Slam title. In 2011, he became the world No. 1 and winner of 48 of 49 matches on the professional tour. Under the terms of the deal, Djokovic receives "incentive bonuses linked to tournament wins and end-of-year rankings, ... a share of all Tacchini revenue from sales in China, and [a share of] worldwide revenue from Djokovic-branded Tacchini products." After his Wimbledon victory, he travelled with Ngok and Burkle to Serbia to discuss plans for investment, including a Tacchini plant, in the Niš area. Tacchini, however, "fell behind on the payments in 2011 as Djokovic's success triggered significant bonuses". Their association ended in May 2012.. Currently, the brand is a sponsor of the ATP Monte-Carlo Masters.

==== Individually sponsored cricket players ====
- (India) Sachin Tendulkar

==== Individually sponsored tennis players ====
===== Present =====
- (Australia) Thomas Bosancic
- (Bosnia and Herzegovina) Mirza Bašić
- (Czech Republic) Barbora Strýcová
- (Luxembourg) Gilles Müller
- (Netherlands) Igor Sijsling
- (Romania) Victor Hănescu
- (Russia) Ekaterina Makarova
- (Slovakia) Martin Kližan
- (Spain) Daniel Gimeno-Traver

===== Past =====
- (Argentina) Gabriela Sabatini
- (Argentina) David Nalbandian
- (Australia) Pat Cash
- (Belgium) Steve Darcis
- (Belgium) Olivier Rochus
- (Croatia) Ivo Karlović
- (Croatia) Goran Ivanišević
- (Italy) Flavia Pennetta
- (Italy) Roberta Vinci
- (Romania) Adrian Ungur
- (Romania) Marius Copil
- (Russia) Igor Andreev
- (Russia) Dinara Safina
- (Serbia) Novak Djokovic
- (Spain) Sergi Bruguera
- (Spain) Tommy Robredo
- (Spain) Juan Carlos Ferrero
- (Sweden) Robert Lindstedt
- (Switzerland) Martina Hingis
- (United States) Pete Sampras
- (United States) John McEnroe
- (United States) Jimmy Connors
- (United States) Martina Navratilova
- (Romania) Ilie Năstase
- (New Zealand) Onny Parun
- (Sweden) Mats Wilander

==== F1 Competition ====
- (Brazil) Ayrton Senna
- (Argentina) Carlos Reutemann

== See also ==
- Fred Perry
- Lacoste
