= John W. Frost =

American tennis player and scholar (born 1934)

John "Jack" Frost
- Country (sports): United States
- Born: 23 October 1934 (age 91) Monterey, California, U.S.
- Turned pro: 1950 (amateur tour)
- Retired: 1968

Singles
- Career record: 305–151
- Career titles: 20

Grand Slam singles results
- French Open: 2R (1959)
- Wimbledon: 4R (1960)
- US Open: 4R (1954, 1961)

Grand Slam doubles results
- Wimbledon: 2R (1958, 1960)

Grand Slam mixed doubles results
- Wimbledon: 3R (1959)

John W. Frost (born October 23, 1934) is an American scholar and former touring tennis player.

== Tennis career ==
In 1949, Frost won the U.S. National Boys' (15-and-under) Championships at Kalamazoo, Michigan and the U.S. National Juniors' (18-and-under) three years later(1952). Following his win, he was awarded a spot on the four-man U.S. Davis Cup team to play against Canada. In the Fall he entered Stanford University, and in his senior year, 1956, he played in the final of the NCAA Singles Championship, losing to Alex Olmedo of U.S.C. A decade later he was inducted into the Stanford Athletics' Hall of Fame.

Following military service, Frost played the international tennis circuit between 1958 and 1963, competing in six Wimbledon Championships and getting out to the 4th round in 1960, before losing to Nicola Pietrangeli. He won the Irish and Wiesbaden (including the mixed doubles with Maria Bueno) and was in the finals of the South African, the Canadian, the Norwegian and the Good Neighbor. During the course of his career he had singles wins in major grass court tournaments over all-time greats Rod Laver, Roy Emerson and Vic Seixas and over numerous international Davis-Cup mainstays on various surfaces: Luis Ayala, Thomaz Koch, Mario Llamas, Antonio Palafox, Giuseppe Merlo, Istvan Gulyas, Bob Mark, Frew McMillan, Christian Kuhnke, Bob Hewitt, Gordon Forbes, Warren Woodcock, Billy Knight, Ron Holmberg, Dennis Ralston, Barry Mackay,"Jack Douglas" and Tom Brown.

Frost beat Whitney Reed at Newport on grass in 1961, the year in which Reed achieved the number one ranking in the U.S., and in 1954 he defeated Straight Clark at Forest Hills in one of the longest matches played there in the pre-open era.

Frost participated in the winning of several major doubles titles: Southampton (with Giammalva over Richardson and Holmberg), Puerto Rico (with Richardson over Contreras and Llamas), and a semi-final win with John Cranston over Laver and Neale Fraser at the Irish Championships. A top 10 player in the United States in 1961, Frost was also ranked number 1 in Northern California in that year. He was subsequently inducted into the Northern California Tennis Hall of Fame.

In 1964 Frost conducted a four-month good-will tennis program in Ghana on behalf of the U.S. Government and did another one in India in 1990.

Jack is retired and lives in Palm Desert, CA.

== Academic ==
Frost received a B.A. from Stanford University, an M.A. from the Monterey Institute of Foreign Studies, and a Ph.D. from the University of California, Santa Barbara (June 15, 1974). Simultaneously, through a series of National Defense Foreign Language grants, he was able to become proficient in Arabic and Swahili and eventually was awarded a Fulbright Fellowship to cover a year abroad, some four months of it to be spent in Khartoum (Sudan). Later he participated in writing an academic history of the British in the Sudan. and contributed a review to the journal of the American Historical Association. More recently he published a specialized history of the Monterey Peninsula.
