= 1960 Wimbledon Championships – Girls' singles =

Girls' singles
- 1960 Wimbledon Championships

Final
- Champion: (United States) Karen Hantze
- Runner-up: (South Africa) Lynne Hutchings
- Score: 6–4, 6–4

Details
- Draw: 15

Events
Singles	men	women		boys	girls
Doubles	men	women	mixed	boys	girls
← 1959 ·	Wimbledon Championships	· 1961 →

Karen Hantze defeated Lynne Hutchings in the final, 6–4, 6–4 to win the girls' singles tennis title at the 1960 Wimbledon Championships.

== Draw ==
=== Key ===
- Q = Qualifier
- WC = Wild card
- LL = Lucky loser
- Alt = Alternate
- SE = Special exempt
- PR = Protected ranking
- ITF = ITF entry
- JE = Junior exempt
- w/o = Walkover
- r = Retired
- d = Defaulted
- SR = Special ranking

=== Draw ===
First round
(South Africa) Lynne Hutchings	6	6
(France) Françoise Dürr	4	4
(Netherlands) Marjan Moritz	6	6
(Austria) R Leyrer	2	1
(United Kingdom) Robin Blakelock	6	6
(Switzerland) S Barrenscheen	0	2
(Socialist Federal Republic of Yugoslavia) M Matejić	4	6	6
(British Guiana) J Franker	6	1	2
(Republic of Ireland) Geraldine Houlihan	2	6	6
(West Germany) Heidi Schildknecht	6	4	4
(Finland) Leena Ahonen	2	0
(Belgium) Micheline Ruquois	6	6
(Norway) Liv Christiansen	5	3
(Denmark) Birgit Grage	7	6

Quarterfinals
(South Africa) Lynne Hutchings	6	6
(Netherlands) Marjan Moritz	2	0
(United Kingdom) Robin Blakelock	6	6
(Socialist Federal Republic of Yugoslavia) M Matejić	2	3
(West Germany) Heidi Schildknecht	6	0
(Belgium) Micheline Ruquois	8	6
(Denmark) Birgit Grage	1	0
(United States) Karen Hantze	6	6

Semifinals
(South Africa) Lynne Hutchings	6	6
(United Kingdom) Robin Blakelock	1	1
(Belgium) Micheline Ruquois	0	0
(United States) Karen Hantze	6	6

Final
(South Africa) Lynne Hutchings	4	4
(United States) Karen Hantze	6	6
