= 1960 Wimbledon Championships – Boys' singles =

Boys' singles
- 1960 Wimbledon Championships

Final
- Champion: (South Africa) Rod Mandelstam
- Runner-up: (India) Jaidip Mukerjea
- Score: 1–6, 8–6, 6–4

Events
Singles	men	women		boys	girls
Doubles	men	women	mixed	boys	girls
← 1959 ·	Wimbledon Championships	· 1961 →

Rod Mandelstam defeated Jaidip Mukerjea in the final, 1–6, 8–6, 6–4 to win the boys' singles tennis title at the 1960 Wimbledon Championships.

== Draw ==
=== Key ===
- Q = Qualifier
- WC = Wild card
- LL = Lucky loser
- Alt = Alternate
- SE = Special exempt
- PR = Protected ranking
- ITF = ITF entry
- JE = Junior exempt
- w/o = Walkover
- r = Retired
- d = Defaulted
- SR = Special ranking

=== Finals ===
Semifinals
(India) Jaidip Mukerjea	6	6
(United States) Frank Froehling	2	2
(France) Christian Duxin	6	5	3
(South Africa) Rod Mandelstam	2	7	6

Final
(India) Jaidip Mukerjea	6	6	4
(South Africa) Rod Mandelstam	1	8	6

=== Top half ===
First round
(United States) Frank Froehling	6	6
(Belgium) Eric Drossart	1	4
(United Kingdom) Roddy Hancock	6	6
(Portugal) R Leitão	2	1
(Socialist Federal Republic of Yugoslavia) D Kovač	6	6
(Colombia) Sergio Correa	1	2
(Lebanon) S Zeydan	1	3
(Austria) Ernst Blanke	6	6

Second round
(India) Jaidip Mukerjea	6	6
(Netherlands) Evert Schneider	2	2
(United Arab Republic) MM Ali	0	0
(Spain) Juan Gisbert	6	6
(United States) F Froehling	6	6
(United Kingdom) R Hancock	3	3
(Socialist Federal Republic of Yugoslavia) D Kovač	6	5	6
(Austria) E Blanke	4	7	4

Quarterfinals
(India) J Mukerjea	6	6
(Spain) J Gisbert	2	4
(United States) F Froehling	6	6
(Socialist Federal Republic of Yugoslavia) D Kovač	0	1

Semifinals
(India) J Mukerjea	6	6
(United States) F Froehling	2	2

=== Bottom half ===
First round
(Poland) Tadeusz Nowicki	2	6	6
(Finland) Pekka Petersen-Dyggve	6	1	2
(Switzerland) U Schafer	w/o
(Myanmar) V Pe Win
(Monaco) Patrick Landau	2	1
(Republic of Ireland) John Murray	6	6

Second round
(Poland) T Nowicki	6	6
(Myanmar) V Pe Win	1	2
(Republic of Ireland) J Murray	2	2
(France) Christian Duxin	6	6
(Denmark) Peter Prochownik	6	1	7
(Norway) T Bryhn	2	6	9
(West Germany) H Plönes	0	2
(South Africa) Rod Mandelstam	6	6

Quarterfinals
(Poland) T Nowicki	1	2
(France) C Duxin	6	6
(Norway) T Bryhn	2	4
(South Africa) R Mandelstam	6	6

Semifinals
(France) C Duxin	6	5	3
(South Africa) R Mandelstam	2	7	6
