= Dieter Ecklebe =

German tennis player

- Country (sports): West Germany
- Born: 16 October 1939 (age 85); Holzminden, Germany
- Plays: Right-handed

Singles

Grand Slam singles results
- French Open: 2R (1959, 1960, 1962)
- Wimbledon: 2R (1960)
- US Open: 2R (1962, 1963)

Dieter Ecklebe (born 16 October 1939) is a German former tennis player.

Born in Holzminden, Lower Saxony, Ecklebe was first called into the West Germany Davis Cup team in 1959, featuring in a tie against Brazil. He appeared in two further ties in 1961.

Ecklebe had a win over Ken Fletcher in the first round of the 1962 French Championships.

In 1964 he was the West German national singles champion.

== See also ==
- List of Germany Davis Cup team representatives
