= Roberto Aubone =

Argentine tennis player (born 1939)

- Country (sports): Argentina
- Born: 1 April 1939

Singles

Grand Slam singles results
- French Open: 1R (1960, 1964)
- Wimbledon: 1R (1960)
- US Open: 2R (1959)

Roberto Aubone (born 1 April 1939) is an Argentine former professional tennis player.

Aubone, known as "Cacho", competed in the Davis Cup for Argentina between 1960 and 1968. He featured in a total of nine ties, from which he won six singles and six doubles rubbers. In 1966, while partnering Eduardo Soriano, he had a doubles win over Mexico's Rafael Osuna and Marcelo Lara, with the match decided 14–12 in the fifth set.

== See also ==
- List of Argentina Davis Cup team representatives
