= John Hammill (tennis) =

- Country (sports): South Africa
- Born: 25 August 1941 (age 84) Boksburg, South Africa

Singles

Grand Slam singles results
- Wimbledon: 1R (1959, 1960)
- US Open: 1R (1960, 1961, 1969)

John Hammill (born 25 August 1941) is a South African-American former professional tennis player.

Hammill, now a U.S. citizen, was born in the mining town of Boksburg, outside Johannesburg. He featured at the Wimbledon Championships in 1959 and 1960, losing his first round match both times in five sets. His father Jack taught him the game and also coached Rod Mandelstam, one of his teammates at the University of Miami, where he played from 1961 to 1964. As a junior in 1963 he earned All-American honors for singles and doubles. In 1979 he was appointed head coach of the team and remained for 16 seasons, amassing 13 NCAA tournament appearances.
