= Mikhail Mozer =

Soviet-Ukrainian tennis player (1935–1993)

- Mozer in 1959
- Country (sports): Soviet Union
- Born: 22 June 1935; Mukačevo, Czechoslovakia
- Died: 28 October 1993 (aged 58)

Singles

Grand Slam singles results
- French Open: 1R (1960)
- Wimbledon: 1R (1960, 1963)

Mikhail Ivanovich Mozer (Russian: Михаил Иванович Мозер; 22 June 1935 – 28 October 1993) was a Ukrainian tennis player who competed for the Soviet Union.

== Career ==
Mozer won the Soviet Championships in both 1959 and 1960. He was unbeaten in Davis Cup competition, winning all four of his singles rubbers, which were all played in 1963 ties, against Finland and Chile. The Ukrainian twice competed at Wimbledon. In the 1960 tournament he lost a five set opening round match to Jiří Javorský and at the same event three years later he again exited in the first round, losing to Rafael Osuna. His only other appearance in a Grand Slam tournament was at the 1960 French Championships, where he was unable to get past Ingo Buding in the opening round.

His daughter is Russian pair skating coach Nina Mozer.
