= Ian Vermaak =

South African tennis player (1933–2025)

- Full name: Ian C. Vermaak
- Country (sports): South Africa
- Born: 28 March 1933; Empangeni, Natal, South Africa
- Died: 21 January 2025 (aged 91)
- Turned pro: 1953 (amateur tour)
- Retired: 1960 (brief periods of activity afterwards)
- Plays: Right-handed (1-handed backhand)

Singles
- Career record: 169-86
- Career titles: 16
- Highest ranking: No. 10 (1959, Lance Tingay)

Grand Slam singles results
- French Open: F (1959)
- Wimbledon: 4R (1960)

Doubles

Grand Slam doubles results
- Wimbledon: QF (1960)

Mixed doubles

Grand Slam mixed doubles results
- Wimbledon: 4R (1959)

Team competitions
- Davis Cup: QF (1959^{(EU)})

Ian Clyde Vermaak (28 March 1933 – 21 January 2025) was a tennis player competing for South Africa.

== Biography ==
As the No. 4 seed he finished runner-up to Nicola Pietrangeli in the singles final of the French Championships at Roland-Garros in 1959, after having reached earlier in the season the Hamburg International German Tennis Championships final, losing to William Knight.

His best result at the Wimbledon Championships was in 1960 when he reached the fourth round in the singles event which he lost in five sets to Ramanathan Krishnan.

Vermaak competed for the South African Davis Cup team in six ties between 1953 and 1960 and compiled a record of five wins and seven losses.

In 1956 he won the singles title of the South African Championships, defeating Torsten Johansson in the final in five sets.

In 1959 he defeated Ron Holmberg in a long quarterfinal match and his countryman Ray Weedon in the final of the 71st Southampton Grass Court Championships on Long Island, New York.

In 1960 he won the Turkish International Championships defeating Fred Stolle in the quarterfinal in five sets, thrice-defending Luis Ayala in the semifinal, and Jorgen Ulrich in the final.

Vermaak was ranked World No. 10 by Lance Tingay of The Daily Telegraph in 1959.

Vermaak died in January 2025, at the age of 91.

== Grand Slam finals ==
=== Singles: (1 runner-up) ===
Result	Year	Championship	Surface	Opponent	Score
Loss	1959	French Championships	Clay	(Italy) Nicola Pietrangeli	3–6, 6–3, 6–4, 6–1
