= Rod Mandelstam =

South African tennis player (born 1942)

- Country (sports): South Africa
- Residence: South Miami, Florida, U.S.
- Born: 8 April 1942 (age 83) Boksburg, South Africa
- Turned pro: 1957(amateur tour)
- Retired: 1974
- College: University of Miami

Singles
- Career record: 80–77(5–8 per ATP)
- Career titles: 3

Grand Slam singles results
- French Open: 1R (1959, 1960)
- Wimbledon: 2R (1959, 1960)
- US Open: 3R (1962)

Doubles

Grand Slam doubles results
- Wimbledon: 3R (1959, 1960)
- US Open: 1R (1973)

Mixed doubles

Grand Slam mixed doubles results
- Wimbledon: 1R (1960)
Medal record
Maccabiah Games
Gold medal – first place	1961 Israel	Mixed Doubles
Silver medal – second place	1961 Israel	Men's Doubles

Alan Rodney 'Rod' Mandelstam (born 8 April 1942) is a former South African tennis player. Mandelstam won the 1960 Wimbledon Boys' Singles title. At the 1961 Maccabiah Games in Israel he won a gold medal in mixed doubles, and a silver medal in men's doubles.

Mandelstam played collegiate tennis for the Miami Hurricanes at the University of Miami, where he was inducted into the University of Miami Hall of Fame.

== Tennis career ==
Mandelstam won the 1960 Wimbledon Boys' Singles title by beating Jaidip Mukerjea in the final. He attended college in the United States at the University of Miami, where he was a member of the university's tennis team and he earned All-American honours for three years from 1962 to 64. Mandelstam was inducted into the University of Miami Hall of Fame in 1990.

At the 1961 Maccabiah Games in Israel he won a gold medal in mixed doubles with Marlene Gerson, and a silver medal in men's doubles, playing with Julie Mayers and against American gold medal winners Dick Savitt and Mike Franks.

Mandelstam competed internationally and won four tournaments between 1962 and 1970. He also participated at the French Open, the Wimbledon Championships, and the US Open. His best result at a Grand Slam tournament was reaching the third round at the 1962 US Open.

== Junior Grand Slam titles ==
=== Singles: 1 ===
Result	Year	Tournament	Surface	Opponent	Score
Win	1960	Wimbledon	Grass	(India) Jaidip Mukerjea	6–1, 6–8, 4–6
