= John O'Brien (tennis) =

Australian tennis player

- Country (sports): Australia
- Born: 6 July 1932 (age 94)
- Plays: Right-handed

Grand Slam singles results
- Australian Open: 2R (1966)
- French Open: 1R (1956, 1960)
- Wimbledon: 4R (1956)

Grand Slam doubles results
- Australian Open: QF (1959)
- Last updated on: 18 December 2014.

John O'Brien (born 6 July 1932) is an Australian tennis player active during the 1950s and 1960s. O'Brien was also one of the 18 hostages in the 2014 Sydney hostage crisis.

== Tennis career ==
O'Brien played the first of ten Australian Championships in 1951. As a singles player, he made eight appearances in the Round of 32 and two in the Round of 64.

In 1956 O'Brien appeared at the French Championships finishing in the first round, however he followed this up with a Round of 16 performance at Wimbledon where he was defeated by eventual champion Lew Hoad. He returned to Roland Garros and Wimbledon in 1960, though he was eliminated in the Round of 128.

O'Brien remained active into his eighties, and was as of December 2014 ranked tenth in the world for players over 80 years old.
