= 1960 Wimbledon Championships =

- Date: 20 June – 2 July
- Edition: 74th
- Category: Grand Slam
- Surface: Grass
- Location: Church Road; SW19, Wimbledon, London, United Kingdom
- Venue: All England Lawn Tennis and Croquet Club

Champions

Men's singles
- (Australia) Neale Fraser

Women's singles
- (Brazil) Maria Bueno

Men's doubles
- (Mexico) Rafael Osuna / (United States) Dennis Ralston

Women's doubles
- (Brazil) Maria Bueno / (United States) Darlene Hard

Mixed doubles
- (Australia) Rod Laver / (United States) Darlene Hard

Boys' singles
- (South Africa) Rod Mandelstam

Girls' singles
- (United States) Karen Hantze
- Wimbledon Championships

The 1960 Wimbledon Championships took place on the outdoor grass courts at the All England Lawn Tennis and Croquet Club in Wimbledon, London, United Kingdom. The tournament ran from Monday 20 June until Saturday 2 July 1960. It was the 74th staging of the Wimbledon Championships, and the third Grand Slam tennis event of 1960. Neale Fraser and Maria Bueno won the singles titles.

== Champions ==
=== Seniors ===
==== Men's singles ====
(Australia) Neale Fraser defeated (Australia) Rod Laver, 6–4, 3–6, 9–7, 7–5

==== Women's singles ====
(Brazil) Maria Bueno defeated (South Africa) Sandra Reynolds, 8–6, 6–0

==== Men's doubles ====
(Mexico) Rafael Osuna / (United States) Dennis Ralston defeated (United Kingdom) Mike Davies / (United Kingdom) Bobby Wilson, 7–5, 6–3, 10–8

==== Women's doubles ====
(Brazil) Maria Bueno / (United States) Darlene Hard defeated (South Africa) Sandra Reynolds / (South Africa) Renée Schuurman, 6–4, 6–0

==== Mixed doubles ====
(Australia) Rod Laver / (United States) Darlene Hard defeated (Australia) Robert Howe / (Brazil) Maria Bueno, 13–11, 3–6, 8–6

=== Juniors ===
==== Boys' singles ====
(South Africa) Rod Mandelstam defeated (India) Jaidip Mukerjea, 1–6, 8–6, 6–4

==== Girls' singles ====
(United States) Karen Hantze defeated (South Africa) Lynne Hutchings, 6–4, 6–4

Preceded by 1960 French Championships	Grand Slams	Succeeded by 1960 U.S. National Championships
