= Torben Ulrich =

Danish tennis player (1928–2023)

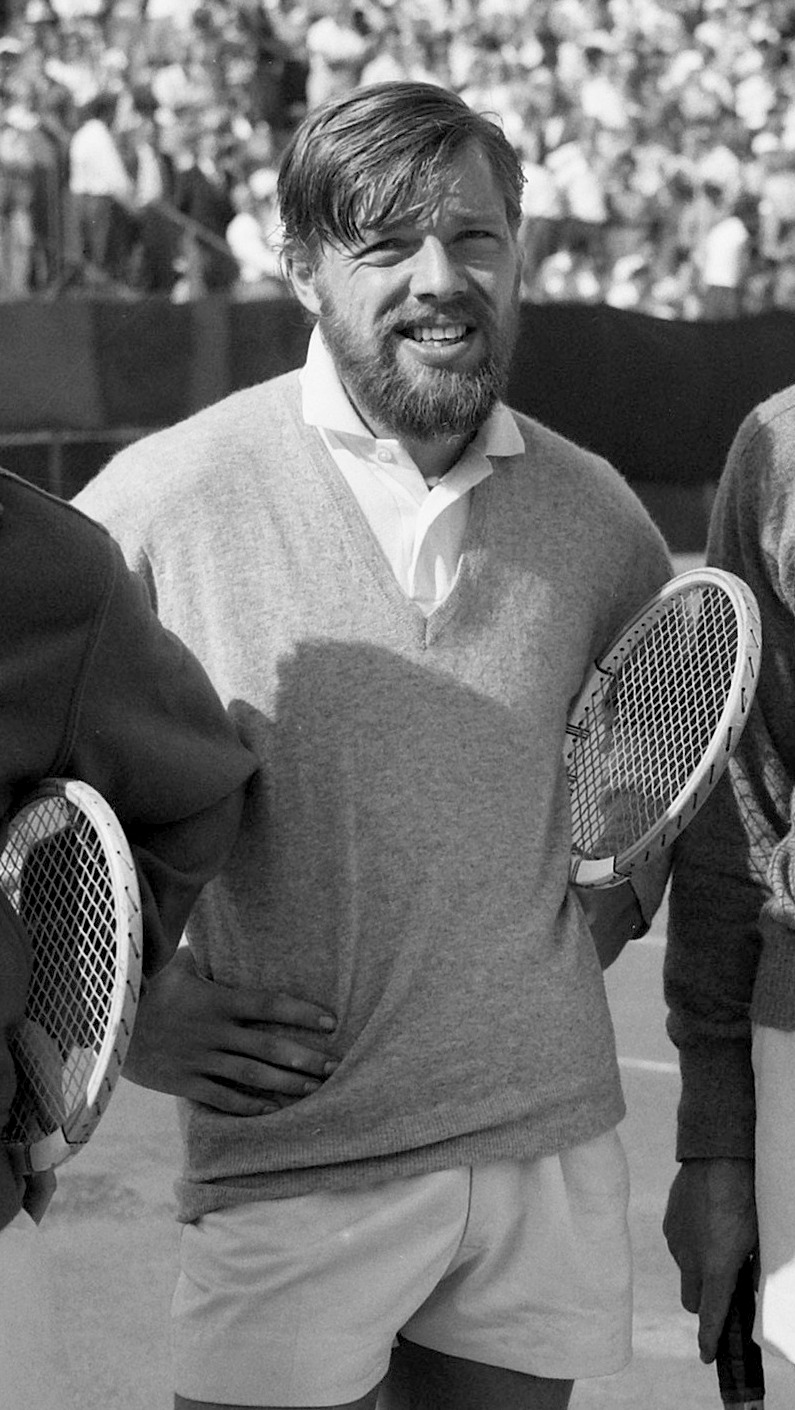
- Ulrich in 1957
- Full name: Torben Ulrich
- Country (sports): Denmark
- Born: 4 October 1928 Frederiksberg, Denmark
- Died: 20 December 2023 (aged 95)
- Height: 1.80 m (5 ft 11 in)
- Plays: Left-handed
- Official website: torbenulrich.com

Singles
- Career record: 97–145
- Career titles: 3
- Highest ranking: No. 96 (15 October 1973)

Grand Slam singles results
- Australian Open: 1R (1971)
- French Open: 4R (1959)
- Wimbledon: 4R (1959)
- US Open: 4R (1953, 1956, 1964, 1968)

Doubles
- Career record: 38–87
- Career titles: 0

Grand Slam doubles results
- Australian Open: 2R (1971)
- French Open: QF (1968)
- Wimbledon: SF (1959)
- US Open: 2R (1968, 1972, 1973, 1975)

Torben Ulrich (4 October 1928 – 20 December 2023) was a Danish writer, musician, filmmaker, and professional tennis player. He was the father of Metallica drummer Lars Ulrich.

== Biography ==
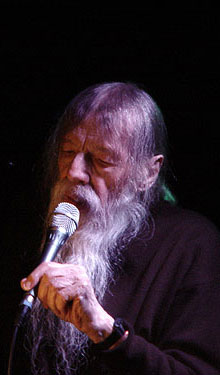
Ulrich in 2009

Ulrich was born on 4 October 1928 in Copenhagen, the son of Ulla (née Meyer) and tennis player Einer Ulrich. His mother was Jewish, and his family was persecuted during World War II. Torben played on the international tennis tour from the late 1940s into the 1970s, and on the international Tennis Grand Masters tour in the 1970s and 1980s. Torben won the Antwerp International singles title in 1951 and again in 1956 when he defeated Jacques Brichant in the final. He won the Stuttgart Open tournament in 1953 on red clay. He became a professional tennis player when he signed a contract with the World Championship Tennis promoters in early 1969 at 40 years old. In 1976 he was the top-ranked senior player in the world. Ulrich played more than 100 Davis Cup matches for Denmark. In 1977, at a month shy of 49, he became one of the oldest player in Davis Cup history.

Ulrich apprenticed at Reuters news agency in Copenhagen in the late 1940s and began writing for Danish jazz magazines. In the 1950s, he wrote primarily on music for the Danish newspapers Information and Politiken, wrote for contemporary jazz music trade journals, and was co-editor (with Gustava Brandt and Bengt Janus) of the literary magazine Bazar. In the 1960s he had a weekly music column and wrote jazz reviews and roving reports on assorted cultural themes (with illustrator Klaus Albrectsen) for the Danish daily newspaper BT. In the 1970s he contributed to the music periodical M.M. and in the 1980s and 1990s returned to Information writing on music, film, athletics, and culture. In 2003 an anthology of his writings from the 1940s to the 2000s, Jazz, Bold & Buddhisme, edited by Lars Movin, was published (in Danish) by Informations Forlag. Two books of his thin columns of poetry-like texts (in English) were published by Forlaget Bebop: Terninger, Tonefald: 12 Lines, 36 Off-Lines (2005) and Stilhedens Cymbaler (2007).

In the 1950s, Ulrich had a New Orleans-type jazz band, playing clarinet. In the 2000s, he was invited to use his voice and texts with the Copenhagen free-jazz trio Clinch (Claus Bøje on drums, Peter Friis Nielsen on bass guitar, Christer Irgens-Møller/keyboards); they released the 2006 album Dice, Done (also with Lotte Anker (saxophone) and Steffen Poulsen (electronica)). In 2005 he founded the collaborative improvised music group Instead Of, composed of Lori Goldston, cello; Angelina Baldoz, trumpet and flutes; Jaison Scott, drums; and Ulrich on voice/texts and "bag of tricks", releasing in 2007 the album Live on Sonarchy. In 2007 he began recording with Danish pianist Søren Kjærgaard, releasing three albums over the next six years: Suddenly, Sound: 21 songlines for piano, drainpipe, etc. (2009), Alphabet, Peaceful, Diminished: 29 Proposals from the Towers of Babble (2010), and Meridiana: Lines Toward a Non-local Alchemy (2014). In 2021, at the age of 92, Ulrich released the jazz record Oakland moments: cello, voice, reuniting (rejoicing), which featured him playing alongside cellist Lori Goldston.

Ulrich began painting in 1971 when the Lions Club of Copenhagen asked a variety of politicians, actors, writers and others to make "a blue elephant" for a charity exhibit to benefit a senior center in Denmark. Instead, he explored what the imprint of the tennis ball might be, and in subsequent years created several series of works, "Imprints of Practice" and "Exsamplings of Play", using played tennis balls, skipped rope, and racquet frame and grip, primarily on rice paper. The works have been exhibited in Copenhagen, Paris, Dublin, New York, Los Angeles, Houston, and Seattle, among other places.

Ulrich appeared in two Jørgen Leth films: Motion Picture (1969) and Moments of Play (1986). He co-directed (with Gil de Kermadec) and appeared in The Ball and The Wall (1988) and co-directed (with Rick New and Molly Martin) and appeared in Body & Being: Before the Wall (2002).

In 2011, Ulrich began development with choreographer-dancer Beth Graczyk and composer-musician Angelina Baldoz on the dance project "Cacophony for 8 Players", which premiered in 2014 in Seattle. Ulrich was the director of and a performer in the work.

In 1986, he received the Gerlev Prize from Gerlev Idrætshøjskole in Denmark for athletico-cultural contributions. In 2006, he received an award from Klara Karolines Fond, "for his inspiration to artists of many kinds and for his views on athletics, art and existence". In 2013, the Ulrich family received the Davis Cup Award.

Ulrich died on 20 December 2023, at the age of 95.

== Singles performance timeline ==
Key
W	F	SF	QF	#R	RR	Q#	P#	DNQ	A	Z#	PO	G	S	B	NMS	NTI	P	NH

(W) winner; (F) finalist; (SF) semifinalist; (QF) quarterfinalist; (#R) rounds 4, 3, 2, 1; (RR) round-robin stage; (Q#) qualification round; (P#) preliminary round; (DNQ) did not qualify; (A) absent; (Z#) Davis/Fed Cup Zonal Group (with number indication) or (PO) play-off; (G) gold, (S) silver or (B) bronze Olympic/Paralympic medal; (NMS) not a Masters tournament; (NTI) not a Tier I tournament; (P) postponed; (NH) not held; (SR) strike rate (events won / competed); (W–L) win–loss record.

The following lists main draw appearances for Grand Slam tournaments only.

Tournament	1948	1949	1950	1951	1952	1953	1954	1955	1956	1957	1958	1959	1960	1961	1962	1963	1964	1965	1966	1967	1968	1969	1970	1971	1972	1973	1974	W–L
Grand slam tournaments
Australian Championships/Open	A	A	A	A	A	A	A	A	A	A	A	A	A	A	A	A	A	A	A	A	A	A	A	1R	A	A	A	0–1
French Championships/Open	2R	A	A	1R	1R	A	A	A	2R^{1}	3R^{1}	1R	4R	2R^{1}	2R^{1}	A	A	2R	1R	2R	3R	2R	1R	A	A	P1	2R	A	11–16
Wimbledon Championships	1R	A	2R	3R	3R	3R	2R	A	3R	1R	3R	4R	1R	A	A	A	3R	2R	2R	1R	3R	1R	3R	1R	2R	A	A	24–20
U.S. National Championships/Open	A	A	A	A	A	4R	A	A	4R	A	A	A	A	A	A	A	4R	A	A	1R	4R	3R	A	A	1R	1R	1R	14–9
Win–loss	1–2	0–0	1–1	2–2	2–2	5–2	1–1	0–0	5–3	1–2	2–2	6–2	0–2	0–1	0–0	0–0	6–3	1–2	2–2	2–3	6–3	2–3	2–1	0–2	1–2	1–2	0–1	49–46

Note: ^{1} First round bye

== See also ==
- List of Denmark Davis Cup team representatives
