= 1960 French Championships (tennis) =

- Date: 17–29 May 1960
- Edition: 59
- Category: 30th Grand Slam (ITF)
- Surface: Clay
- Location: Paris (XVI^{e}), France
- Venue: Stade Roland Garros

Champions

Men's singles
- (Italy) Nicola Pietrangeli

Women's singles
- (United States) Darlene Hard

Men's doubles
- (Australia) Roy Emerson / (Australia) Neale Fraser

Women's doubles
- (Brazil) Maria Bueno / (United States) Darlene Hard

Mixed doubles
- (Brazil) Maria Bueno / (Australia) Bob Howe
- French Championships

The 1960 French Championships (now known as the French Open) was a tennis tournament that took place on the outdoor clay courts at the Stade Roland-Garros in Paris, France. The tournament ran from 17 May until 29 May. It was the 59th staging of the French Championships, and the second Grand Slam tennis event of 1960. Nicola Pietrangeli and Darlene Hard won the singles titles.

== Finals ==
=== Men's singles ===
(Italy) Nicola Pietrangeli defeated (Chile) Luis Ayala 3–6, 6–3, 6–4, 4–6, 6–3

=== Women's singles ===
(United States) Darlene Hard defeated (Mexico) Yola Ramírez 6–3, 6–4

=== Men's doubles ===
(Australia) Roy Emerson / (Australia) Neale Fraser defeated (Spain) José Luis Arilla / (Spain) Andrés Gimeno 6–2, 8–10, 7–5, 6–4

=== Women's doubles ===
(Brazil) Maria Bueno / (United States) Darlene Hard defeated (United Kingdom) Pat Ward Hales / (United Kingdom) Ann Haydon 6–2, 7–5

=== Mixed doubles ===
(Brazil) Maria Bueno / (Australia) Bob Howe defeated (United Kingdom) Ann Haydon / (Australia) Roy Emerson 1–6, 6–1, 6–2

Preceded by 1960 Australian Championships	Grand Slams	Succeeded by 1960 Wimbledon Championships
