= Mario Llamas =

Mexican tennis player (1928–2014)

- Country (sports): Mexico
- Born: 30 March 1928 Mexico City
- Died: 17 June 2014 (aged 86) Mexico

Singles
- Career record: 237–122
- Career titles: 16

Grand Slam singles results
- French Open: 4R (1961)
- Wimbledon: 4R (1960)
- US Open: 2R (1956)

Team competitions
- Davis Cup: F^{Ch} (1962)
Medal record
Pan American Games
Gold medal – first place	1955 Mexico City	Men's doubles
Silver medal – second place	1963 Sao Paulo	Men's singles

Mario Llamas (30 March 1928 – 17 June 2014) was a tennis player from Mexico.

== Career ==
Llamas was a regular fixture on the Mexico Davis Cup team, appearing in a total of 21 ties during his career. He won 21 of his 44 rubbers, 15 of them in singles. In the 1962 Davis Cup, Llamas was a member of the team that finished as the runner-up. Although he did not play in the final against Australia, he took part in the America Zone and Inter-Zone finals. He had a win over Rod Laver in a 1959 Davis Cup match.

At the 1960 Wimbledon Championships he had wins over Barry Phillips-Moore, Warren Woodcock and Roger Becker, before losing in the round of 16 to Roy Emerson. He also made the fourth round of the 1961 French Championships, where he was seeded 13th.

Llamas was a gold medalist in the men's doubles at the 1955 Pan American Games, with Gustavo Palafox as his partner. In the 1963 Pan American Games he took home a silver medal in the singles, after losing to gold medal playoff to Ronald Barnes.

his other career singles highlights include winning the Pan American Championships on clay courts at Centro Deportivo Chapultepec, Mexico City three times (1958–59, 1963).

Llamas died on 17 June 2014 at the age of 86.
