= Jørgen Ulrich =

Danish tennis player (1935–2010)

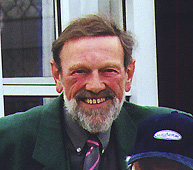
- Country (sports): Denmark
- Born: 21 August 1935 Hellerup, Denmark
- Died: 22 July 2010 (aged 74) Greece
- Turned pro: 1941 (amateur tour)
- Retired: 1973
- Plays: Right-handed

Singles
- Career record: 294–196 (28–31 per ATP)

Grand Slam singles results
- French Open: 3R (1957, 1960)
- Wimbledon: 4R (1959, 1960, 1964)
- US Open: 2R (1962)

Doubles
- Career record: 6–9
- Career titles: 0

Grand Slam doubles results
- Wimbledon: QF (1966)

Jørgen Ulrich (21 August 1935 – 22 July 2010) was a Danish tennis player.

== Career ==
Ulrich was a regular member of the Danish Davis Cup team for 1953 to 1972 and played a total of 54 matches in 22 ties for his country. His first Davis Cup appearance was in the 1955 Europe Zone second round tie against South Africa, in which he won his first match against Abe Segal and lost his second against Gordon Forbes. His last Davis Cup appearance was during the 1971 Europe Zone A, 5–0 first round defeat to the Soviet Union.

Ulrich has participated in the Wimbledon Championship 21 times, with his last appearance in 1972. He reached the fourth round in singles at Wimbledon on three occasions and in doubles, partnering Jan Leschly, he reached the quarterfinals in 1966.

On the amateur circuit he won several tournaments, including the German Indoor Championships singles in 1957 and 1971, the French Covered Court Championships singles in 1960 and 1961 and the Scandinavian Indoor Championships singles in 1964 as well as the doubles on four occasions, twice each with Kurt Nielsen and Jan Leschly.

== Personal life ==
Ulrich is, by seven years, the younger brother of the former professional tennis player, musician and artist Torben Ulrich, the son of the tennis player Einer Ulrich, and uncle to Metallica drummer Lars Ulrich. Ulrich, who was also a qualified lawyer, died while on holiday in Greece on 22 July 2010.

== See also ==
- List of Denmark Davis Cup team representatives
