= Mike Davies (tennis) =

Welsh professional tennis player, entrepreneur and administrator (1936–2015)

- Full name: Michael Grenfell Davies
- Country (sports): Great Britain
- Residence: Sarasota, Florida
- Born: 9 January 1936 Swansea, Wales
- Died: 2 November 2015 (aged 79) Sarasota, Florida
- Height: 1.83 m (6 ft 0 in)
- Turned pro: 1960 (amateur from 1953)
- Retired: 1969
- Plays: Right-handed (one-handed backhand)
- Int. Tennis HoF: 2012 (member page)

Singles
- Career record: 302-199 (60.2%)
- Career titles: 34

Grand Slam singles results
- Australian Open: 2R (1954, 1957)
- French Open: 3R (1956, 1957)
- Wimbledon: 4R (1954)
- US Open: 2R (1957, 1958)

Other tournaments
- Professional majors
- US Pro: QF (1966, 1967)
- Wembley Pro: SF (1966)
- French Pro: QF (1962, 1966, 1967)

Grand Slam doubles results
- Australian Open: SF (1957)
- Wimbledon: F (1960)

Grand Slam mixed doubles results
- Wimbledon: 3R (1954)

Michael Grenfell "Mike" Davies (9 January 1936 – 2 November 2015) was a Welsh professional tennis player, entrepreneur and administrator. He had a 60-year career in the tennis business, first as an amateur and professional tennis player, including a period as the number one ranked player in Great Britain and a member of the British Davis Cup team, then as an entrepreneur and one of the pioneers of the professional game.

== Playing career ==
Davies was born in Swansea, Wales. He took up tennis at the age of 11, and was discovered by Fred Perry and Dan Maskell. He played on the British Davis Cup team with Bobby Wilson, Billy Knight and Roger Becker.

In 1952 Davies went to Australia for the first of three winter visits to work with Harry Hopman, the Australian Davis Cup Coach, and Australian players like Lew Hoad, Ken Rosewall, Roy Emerson, Fred Stolle. It was there that Davies developed his game.

From 1958 to 1960 Davies was ranked number 1 in Great Britain. He played on the Davis Cup team for Great Britain from 1956 to 1960 and had a 15/8 match record. In 1960 he reached the final of the men's doubles at Wimbledon with Bobby Wilson; the last time a British male reached the final of Wimbledon's men's singles or men's doubles until 2012.

After that doubles final, in 1960, he was invited to turn professional with Jack Kramer for a two-year guarantee of £4,500-a-year. He joined a select group of players considered to be the best in the world such as Pancho Gonzales, Tony Trabert, Lew Hoad, Ken Rosewall and Pancho Segura.

Since international tennis at this time was an amateur sport, Davies' professional status put him at odds with the ruling tennis body, the International Tennis Federation (ITF), and his membership of the All-England Club at Wimbledon was cancelled, and he became ineligible to ever play Davis Cup or any of the Grand Slams again. As well as playing he was elected to the board of the first Players' Association that was formed by this select group of approximately 12–15 players and found himself leading the charge to promote professional tennis and to fight for open tennis. Soon Davies found himself doubling up as the tour's spokesman and selling the upcoming events and taking the first steps towards a flourishing career in the promotion of tennis as a business. This first Players Association (IPTPA) was the forerunner of what is now the Association of Tennis Professionals (ATP), of which Davies was to become executive director in 1982.

In 1961 Davies published two books: one a teaching book, and the other a biography called Tennis Rebel (Stanley Paul, London).

Davies retired in 1967, one year before Wimbledon finally allowed professionals to play. However, he did come out of retirement to play in the first Open at Wimbledon. He had missed 28 Grand Slam events during the ban.

== Grand Slam finals ==
=== Doubles (1 runner-up) ===
Result	Year	Championship	Surface	Partner	Opponents	Score
Loss	1960	Wimbledon	Grass	(United Kingdom) Bobby Wilson	(United States) Dennis Ralston (Mexico) Rafael Osuna	5–7, 3–6, 8–10

== Entrepreneurial career ==
=== WCT ===
In 1967 Lamar Hunt co-founded World Championship Tennis (WCT) with his nephew, Al G. Hill Jr. and, in 1968, they hired Davies as the executive director with the task of building WCT into a major force. They had eight contracted players and promoted them as The Handsome Eight: Dennis Ralston, Butch Buchholz, Pierre Barthès, John Newcombe, Tony Roche, Nikki Pilic, Roger Taylor and Cliff Drysdale. WCT guaranteed each a certain amount of money for a certain number of weeks of play each year. After a couple of years, WCT bought the contracts of the other professional players at the time, including Rod Laver, Ken Rosewall, Roy Emerson, Andrés Gimeno and signed former amateurs Arthur Ashe and Stan Smith to professional contracts.

In 1970, Davies put together the plans for the first million-dollar tour: 20 tournaments throughout the world, played in 20 cities, 32 players under contract, each receiving $50,000. The eight with the best record would qualify for the WCT finals in Dallas. Davies ran the Dallas-based WCT as executive director for 13 years.

During his time with WCT Davies was responsible for the following innovations and rule changes in the game:

- first professional circuit to incorporate the tie-breaker
- first to insist on coloured clothing on the players
- introduction of a coloured tennis ball (first orange, then yellow) in 1972
- Davies created the 30 seconds between points and the 90 seconds between games
- first to place chairs on the court for the players during change-overs
- first to have a player representative and a trainer travel with the players to each tournament
- overrule by the umpire and experimented with electronic line calling in 1972
- first to complete a television deal with a major network (NBC) for its World Championship of Tennis Series, culminating in the Dallas finals
- first to syndicate tournaments in the U.S.
- first to sign a contract (with ESPN) before the network came on the air

=== ATP ===
In 1981 Davies left WCT after 13 years and joined his lifelong friend Butch Buchholz as marketing director of the Association of Tennis Professionals (ATP). One year later, when Buchholz left the ATP, Davies took over as executive director. The ATP was almost bankrupt at the time, and when Davies left after three years they had over $1 million in assets. He helped consolidate the players' pension plan and created more jobs for players with bigger draws and more tournaments and bigger prize money.

=== MITPC ===
Davies also served on the Men's Pro Council and was chairman of this committee which administered the Men's Professional Circuit, before the ATP.

=== ITF ===
In 1987 Davies joined the International Tennis Federation (ITF) and later moved back to London as general manager and marketing director. He was made a full member of the All England Lawn Tennis and Croquet Club at Wimbledon in 1990–30 years after they had withdrawn his membership. During these years Davies almost tripled the Sponsorship and International Television revenue for the ITF, and created the Grand Slam Committee which now oversees the four Grand Slam events

=== Grand Slam Cup ===
Davies also created the Grand Slam Cup which was first played in Munich Germany in 1990. This event was for the 16 players who had the best record in the four Grand Slam events. The prize money was $6 million, with $2 million going to the winner of the event. Still the highest prize money per player ever. In 1994 Davies negotiated the largest tennis Television contract which was between German TV, the German Tennis Federation and the ITF for a five-year deal for $200 million.

== Retirement and death ==
Davies retired in 1995 and moved back to the United States. In 1997, he and Butch Buchholz, took over control of the Pilot Pen Tennis tournament in Connecticut. The tournament is played the week before the US Open in August and is owned by the USTA.

Davies has been inducted in 2012 to the International Tennis Hall of Fame for his role in the transformation of the sport into a world-wide concern. Davies died in Sarasota, Florida on 2 November 2015 from mesothelioma at the age of 79.
