= Antonio Palafox =

Mexican tennis player (born 1936)

- Full name: Antonio R. Palafox
- Country (sports): Mexico
- Born: 28 April 1936 (age 90) Guadalajara, Mexico

Singles
- Career record: 267–158
- Career titles: 14

Grand Slam singles results
- French Open: 3R (1958, 1964)
- Wimbledon: 4R (1961, 1963)
- US Open: QF (1965)

Grand Slam doubles results
- Wimbledon: W (1963)
- US Open: W (1962)

Grand Slam mixed doubles results
- Wimbledon: QF (1960)
- US Open: F (1960)

Team competitions
- Davis Cup: F^{Ch} (1962)
Medal record
Representing Mexico
Tennis
Pan American Games
Gold medal – first place	1959 Chicago	Men's doubles

Antonio Palafox (born 28 April 1936) is a Mexican male former tennis player. He and compatriot Rafael Osuna won the doubles at the U.S. Open in 1962 and at Wimbledon in 1963. He is remembered along with Rafael Osuna, Francisco "Pancho" Contreras and Mario Llamas for guiding Mexico to the final of the Davis Cup in 1962.

Palafox won the 1958 Mexican Championships defeating Pancho Contreras in the final and he won the Mexican title again in 1963 defeating Rafael Osuna in the final.

Also in 1958 Palafox won the Southern Championships defeating Frank Willett, the defending champion, in the final.

Palafox won the Eastern Clay Court Championships in 1970 at Port Washington, N.Y. beating Sandy Mayer in the semifinal and Otokar Merunka in three straight sets in the final. He defended his title the following year defeating Steve Ross in the final in three straight sets.

He is a former coach of John McEnroe, and taught him to put yourself in an advantageous positions and putting your opponent in difficult positions.

== Grand Slam finals ==
=== Doubles (2 titles, 2 runners-up) ===
Result	Year	Championship	Surface	Partner	Opponents	Score
Loss	1961	U.S. National Championships	Grass	(Mexico) Rafael Osuna	(United States) Chuck McKinley (United States) Dennis Ralston	3–6, 4–6, 6–2, 11–13
Win	1962	U.S. National Championships	Grass	(Mexico) Rafael Osuna	(United States) Chuck McKinley (United States) Dennis Ralston	6–4, 10–12, 1–6, 9–7, 6–3
Win	1963	Wimbledon	Grass	(Mexico) Rafael Osuna	(France) Jean-Claude Barclay (France) Pierre Darmon	4–6, 6–2, 6–2, 6–2
Loss	1963	U.S. National Championships	Grass	(Mexico) Rafael Osuna	(United States) Chuck McKinley (United States) Dennis Ralston	7–9, 6–4, 7–5, 3–6, 9–11

=== Mixed Doubles (1 runner-up) ===
Result	Year	Championship	Surface	Partner	Opponents	Score
Loss	1960	U.S. National Championships	Grass	(Brazil) Maria Bueno	(United States) Margaret Osborne duPont (Australia) Neale Fraser	3–6, 2–6
