= Roger Becker =

British tennis player (1934–2017)

- Country (sports): United Kingdom
- Born: 6 February 1934 Croydon, England
- Died: 6 November 2017 (aged 83)

Grand Slam singles results
- Australian Open: 3R (1955)
- French Open: 4R (1956)
- Wimbledon: 3R (1954, 1960)
- US Open: 3R (1954)

Other tournaments
- Professional majors
- Wembley Pro: PR (1964)

Grand Slam doubles results
- Australian Open: 2R (1955)
- Wimbledon: SF (1957)

Grand Slam mixed doubles results
- Wimbledon: 4R (1955, 1958)

Roger Becker (6 February 1934 – 6 November 2017) was a British tennis player. Becker also played cricket, football and golf before pursuing tennis competitively in 1949.

In 1952, Becker played in the Davis Cup when he was aged 18, the youngest British player at the time to play in the tournament. His record stood until 2005, when it was broken by 17-year=old Andy Murray. Becker later served as Paul Hutchins' coach for a time.
