= José Luis Arilla =

Spanish tennis player (born 1941)

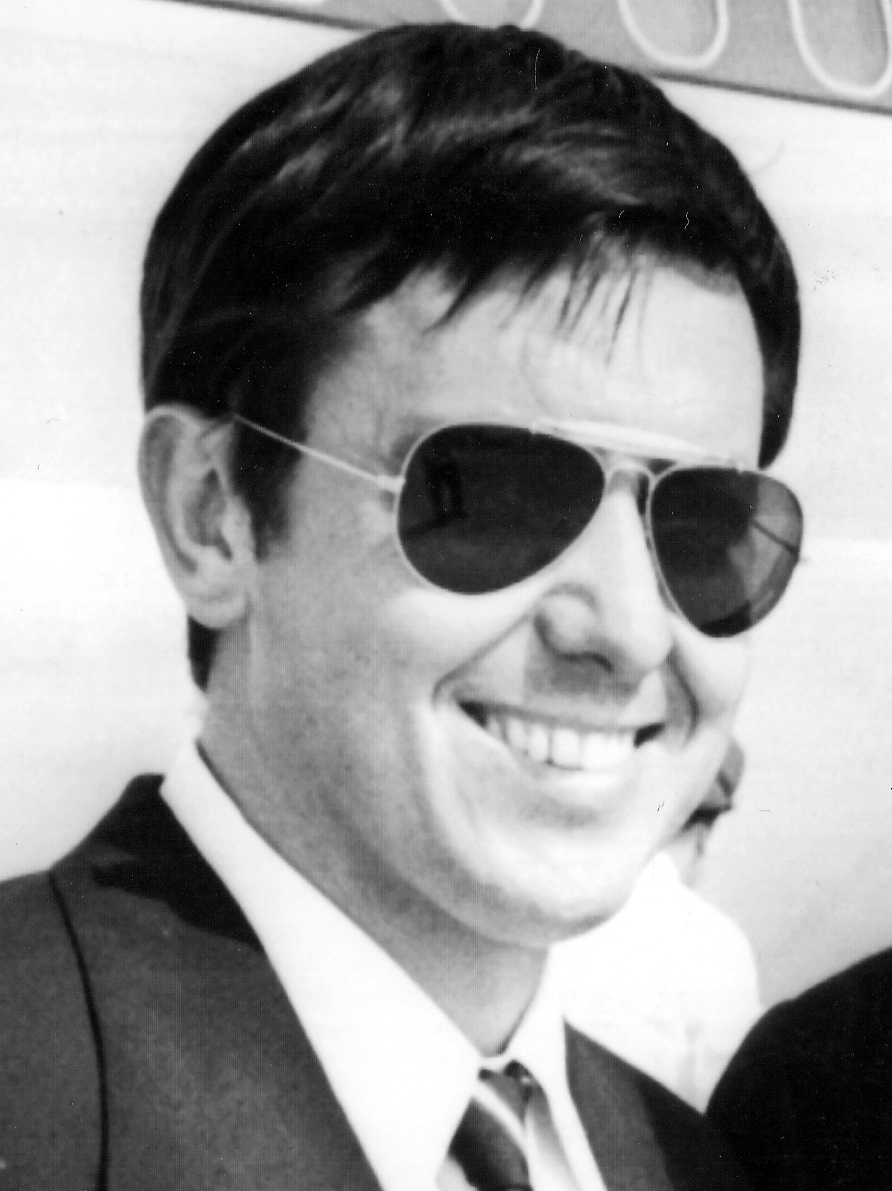
- Country (sports): Spain
- Born: 5 March 1941 (age 84); Barcelona, Spain

Singles
- Career record: 13–24

Grand Slam singles results
- French Open: 3R (1964)
- Wimbledon: 4R (1963, 1964)
- US Open: 3R (1964)

Doubles
- Career record: 14–13

Grand Slam doubles results
- French Open: F (1960)

José Luis Arilla (born 5 March 1941) is a Spanish former tennis player. He was the partner of Manuel Santana in Davis Cup matches. He only played 16 matches in the Open Era, and his best result in those times were the quarters of the 1968 Torneo Godó.

== Grand Slam finals ==
=== Doubles (1 runner-up) ===
Result	Year	Championship	Surface	Partner	Opponents	Score
Loss	1960	French Championships	Clay	(Spain) Andrés Gimeno	(Australia) Roy Emerson (Australia) Neale Fraser	2–6, 10–8, 5–7, 4–6
