= Nicola Pietrangeli =

Italian tennis player (1933–2025)

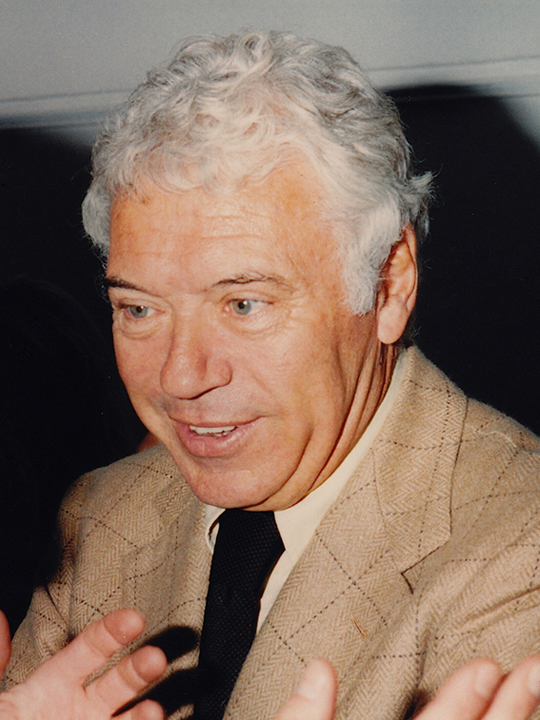
- Pietrangeli in 1996
- Full name: Nicola Chirinsky Pietrangeli
- Country (sports): Italy
- Born: 11 September 1933 Tunis, French protectorate of Tunisia
- Died: 1 December 2025 (aged 92) Rome, Italy
- Height: 1.78 m (5 ft 10 in)
- Turned pro: 1968 (amateur from 1953)
- Retired: 1973
- Plays: Right-handed (one-handed backhand)
- Int. Tennis HoF: 1986 (member page)

Singles
- Career record: 687–278 (71.4%)
- Career titles: 44
- Highest ranking: No. 3 (1959, Lance Tingay)

Grand Slam singles results
- Australian Open: QF (1957)
- French Open: W (1959, 1960)
- Wimbledon: SF (1960)
- US Open: 3R (1955, 1965)

Doubles
- Career record: 21–20
- Career titles: 8

Grand Slam doubles results
- French Open: W (1959)
- Wimbledon: F (1956)

Grand Slam mixed doubles results
- French Open: W (1958)
- Wimbledon: 3R (1955, 1959)

Team competitions
- Davis Cup: F (1960^{Ch}, 1961^{Ch})
Medal record
Representing Italy
Mediterranean Games
Gold medal – first place	1963 Naples	Singles
Bronze medal – third place	1963 Naples	Doubles

Nicola Chirinsky Pietrangeli (Italian pronunciation: [niˈkɔːla pjeˈtrandʒeli]; born Chirinsky; 11 September 1933 – 1 December 2025) was an Italian tennis player. He won two singles titles at the French Championships and is considered by many to be one of Italy's greatest tennis champions.

== Early life ==
Nicola Chirinsky was born 11 September 1933 in Tunis, then a French colony, to Giulio Pietrangeli, also born in Tunis but of Italian parents from Abruzzo and Anna Chirinskaya (née von Yourgens), a Russian noble mother. At the time of his birth, his mother was married to a Russian count, and he only acquired the surname Pietrangeli upon her marriage to his father, who was interned as a political prisoner during the Allied invasion of Tunisia in World War II. He started playing tennis during that period, until his father was expelled in 1946 and the family settled in Rome, Italy. There, Pietrangeli, a native French and Russian speaker, learned Italian.

== Career ==
Pietrangeli made his international debut at the 1952 Italian Open, losing in four sets to Jacques Peten. He appeared in four men's singles finals at Roland Garros – winning the title in 1959 and 1960, and finishing runner-up in 1961 and 1964. He also won the Roland Garros men's doubles title in 1959 (together with Orlando Sirola), and the mixed doubles in 1958. At Wimbledon, Pietrangeli was a single semifinalist in 1960, when he lost to Rod Laver in 5 sets. He won the Italian Open in 1957 and 1961 and was ranked World No. 3 by Lance Tingay of The Daily Telegraph in 1959 and 1960 and also by Ned Potter in 1961.

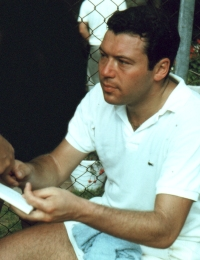
Pietrangeli in 1964

Pietrangeli represented Italy in the Davis Cup between 1954 and 1972. He played in a record 164 Davis Cup rubbers, winning a record 120. He was a player on the Italian teams which reached the Davis Cup final in 1960 and 1961. Both finals were played on grass tennis courts in Australia, and the Italians were not able to overcome the strong Australian team which included Laver, Roy Emerson, and Neale Fraser.

After retiring as a player, Pietrangeli became Italy's Davis Cup team captain and guided them to winning their first-ever Davis Cup in 1976.

Pietrangeli was inducted in the International Tennis Hall of Fame in 1986. On his 73rd birthday, the old tennis stadium in Foro Italico of Rome was named in his honour. He is among the very few tennis players to have received such an honour while still living (others include Laver and Margaret Court).

=== Other ventures ===
Pietrangeli was a supporter of S.S. Lazio and also played in the team in his youth. He also played a supporting role in the movie There Was a Castle with Forty Dogs in 1990.

== Personal life and death ==
Pietrangeli was an Eastern Orthodox Christian like his Russian mother. He had three children with his first wife, Susanna, who later left him for another man. He had a long relationship with the Italian journalist and TV presenter Licia Colò, 28 years younger than he was.

Pietrangeli died in Rome on 1 December 2025, at the age of 92, as announced by the Italian Tennis and Padel Federation. He had experienced declining health after sustaining a hip fracture in December 2024.

== Grand Slam finals ==
=== Singles (2 titles, 2 runners-up) ===
Result	Year	Championship	Surface	Opponent	Score
Win	1959	French Championships	Clay	(South Africa) Ian Vermaak	3–6, 6–3, 6–4, 6–1
Win	1960	French Championships	Clay	(Chile) Luis Ayala	3–6, 6–3, 6–4, 4–6, 6–3
Loss	1961	French Championships	Clay	(Spain) Manuel Santana	6–4, 1–6, 6–3, 0–6, 2–6
Loss	1964	French Championships	Clay	(Spain) Manuel Santana	3–6, 1–6, 6–4, 5–7

=== Doubles (1 title, 2 runners-up) ===
Result	Year	Championship	Surface	Partner	Opponents	Score
Loss	1955	French Championships	Clay	(Italy) Orlando Sirola	(United States) Vic Seixas (United States) Tony Trabert	1–6, 6–4, 2–6, 4–6
Loss	1956	Wimbledon Championships	Grass	(Italy) Orlando Sirola	(Australia) Lew Hoad (Australia) Ken Rosewall	5–7, 2–6, 1–6
Win	1959	French Championships	Clay	(Italy) Orlando Sirola	(Australia) Roy Emerson (Australia) Neale Fraser	6–3, 6–2, 14–12

=== Mixed doubles (1 title) ===
Result	Year	Championship	Surface	Partner	Opponents	Score
Win	1958	French Championships	Clay	(United Kingdom) Shirley Bloomer	(Australia) Lorraine Coghlan (Australia) Bob Howe	8–6, 6–2

== Performance timeline ==
Key
W	F	SF	QF	#R	RR	Q#	DNQ	A	NH

(W) winner; (F) finalist; (SF) semifinalist; (QF) quarterfinalist; (#R) rounds 4, 3, 2, 1; (RR) round-robin stage; (Q#) qualification round; (DNQ) did not qualify; (A) absent; (NH) not held; (SR) strike rate (events won / competed); (W–L) win–loss record.

Tournament	Amateur career														Open career						Career SR	Career W–L	Career Win%
Tournament	'54	'55	'56	'57	'58	'59	'60	'61	'62	'63	'64	'65	'66	'67	'68	'69	'70	'71	'72	'73	Career SR	Career W–L	Career Win%
Grand Slam tournaments
Australian Open	A	A	A	QF	A	A	A	A	A	A	A	A	A	A	A	A	A	A	A	A	0 / 1	2–1	67%
French Open	3R	3R	QF	1R	4R	W	W	F	QF	QF	F	4R	3R	3R	1R	1R	3R	3R	3R	1R	2 / 20	50–17	75%
Wimbledon	2R	QF	4R	1R	4R	1R	SF	3R	3R	3R	2R	4R	1R	2R	1R	1R	1R	A	3R	1R	0 / 19	29–18	62%
US Open	A	3R	A	A	A	A	A	A	1R	A	2R	3R	A	A	A	A	A	A	A	A	0 / 4	5–3	63%
Career																					2 / 44	86–39	69%

== See also ==
- Walk of Fame of Italian sport
