= Francisco Contreras (tennis) =

Mexican tennis player (1934–2022)

- Full name: Francisco Contreras Serrano
- Country (sports): Mexico
- Born: 16 June 1934; Mexico City
- Died: 12 July 2022 (aged 88)
- Plays: Right-handed

Singles
- Career record: 197-145
- Career titles: 3

Grand Slam singles results
- French Open: 4R (1957)
- Wimbledon: 2R (1957, 1958, 1960)
- US Open: 4R (1956)
Medal record
Pan American Games
Gold medal – first place	1963 São Paulo	Mixed doubles
Silver medal – second place	1959 Chicago	Mixed doubles
Silver medal – second place	1959 Chicago	Men's doubles
Bronze medal – third place	1963 São Paulo	Men's singles
Central American and Caribbean Games
Gold medal – first place	1959 Caracas	Men's doubles
Silver medal – second place	1959 Caracas	Men's singles

Francisco Contreras Serrano (16 June 1934 – 12 July 2022), also known as Pancho Contreras, was a Mexican tennis player. He both played for and captained the Mexico Davis Cup team.

== Biography ==
Born in Mexico City in 1934, Contreras completed his studies in California, attending Modesto Junior College. Along with his Modesto teammate Joaquín Reyes, he went on to play college tennis for the University of Southern California and the pair combined to win the 1955 NCAA doubles championships. He won the NCAA doubles championship again in 1956, this time partnering Peruvian player Alex Olmedo.

Contreras reached the round of 16 at both the 1956 U.S. National Championships and the 1957 French Championships. At the 1958 Wimbledon Championships, he partnered with Rosie Reyes to make the semifinals of the mixed doubles. He won a men's doubles gold medal at the 1959 Central American and Caribbean Games and was a mixed-doubles gold medalist at 1963 Pan American Games, partnering Yola Ramírez.

=== Davis Cup ===
Contreras debuted for Mexico's Davis Cup team in 1953 and played his 12th and final tie during the nation's historic run to the 1962 Davis Cup final. He was team captain for Mexico in the 1962 campaign, which included a win over the United States. In order to rest players, he featured in two dead rubber singles matches, against Yugoslavia and India, en route to the final. In the final against Australia in Brisbane, he remained on the sidelines, as the home side were victorious 5–0.

== See also ==
- List of Mexico Davis Cup team representatives
