= 1952 Davis Cup Europe Zone =

International tennis competition

Details
- Duration: 1 May 1952 – 28 July 1952
- Teams: 21
- Categories: 1952 Davis Cup Europe Zone; 1952 Davis Cup America Zone

Champion
- Winning nation: Italy; Qualified for: 1952 Davis Cup; Inter-Zonal Finals

The Europe Zone was one of the two regional zones of the 1952 Davis Cup.

23 teams entered the Europe Zone, with the winner going on to compete in the Inter-Zonal Zone against the winners of the America Zone and Eastern Zone. Italy defeated Belgium in the final and progressed to the Inter-Zonal Zone.

== Draw ==
First Round; 1–11 May
West Germany
bye
Brazil
bye
Denmark
bye
Monaco	4
Ireland	1
Italy
bye
Luxembourg	0
Egypt	5
Great Britain
bye
Yugoslavia	3
Finland	2
Norway	0
France	5
bye
Netherlands
Turkey	1
Switzerland	4
bye
Argentina
Austria	1
Chile	4
bye
Sweden
Israel
Hungary	w/o
bye
Belgium

Second Round; 16–19 May
Düsseldorf, West Germany
West Germany	3
Brazil	2
Monte Carlo, Monaco (clay)
Denmark	5
Monaco	0
Rome, Italy (clay)
Italy	5
Egypt	0
Belgrade, Yugoslavia (clay)
Great Britain	3
Yugoslavia	2
Paris, France (clay)
France	4
Netherlands	1
Lausanne, Switzerland
Switzerland	0
Argentina	5
Solna, Sweden (clay)
Chile	0
Sweden	5
Brussels, Belgium
Hungary	1
Belgium	4

Quarterfinals; 13–16 June
Copenhagen, Denmark (clay)
West Germany	1
Denmark	4
Bologna, Italy (clay)
Italy	4
Great Britain	1
Paris, France (clay)
France	3
Argentina	2
Brussels, Belgium (clay)
Sweden	2
Belgium	3

Semifinals; 11–14 July
Milan, Italy (clay)
Denmark	1
Italy	4
Paris, France (clay)
France	2
Belgium	3

Final; 25–28 July
Milan, Italy (clay)
Italy	3
Belgium	1

== First round ==
=== Monaco vs. Ireland ===
Monaco
4
Monte Carlo, Monaco
1–4 May 1952

Ireland
1

			1	2	3	4	5
1	(Monaco) (Republic of Ireland)	Georges Pasquier; Cyril Kemp	5; 7	4; 6	6; 8
2	(Monaco) (Republic of Ireland)	Aleco Noghès; Joseph Hackett	9; 11	8; 10	6; 3	6; 4	8; 6
3	(Monaco) (Republic of Ireland)	Aleco Noghès / Georges Pasquier; Joseph Hackett / Cyril Kemp	6; 1	6; 2	2; 6	6; 2
4	(Monaco) (Republic of Ireland)	Georges Pasquier; Joseph Hackett	4; 6	6; 2	6; 4	4; 6	6; 3
5	(Monaco) (Republic of Ireland)	Aleco Noghès; Cyril Kemp	6; 4	6; 4	6; 4

=== Luxembourg vs. Egypt ===
Luxembourg
0
Mondorf-les-Bains, Luxembourg
1–4 May 1952

Egypt
5

			1	2	3	4	5
1	(Luxembourg) (Egypt)	Paul Decker; Adel Ismail	1; 6	1; 6	0; 6
2	(Luxembourg) (Egypt)	Géza Wertheim; Adli El Shafei	1; 6	3; 6	2; 6
3	(Luxembourg) (Egypt)	Victor Klees / Géza Wertheim; Marcel Coen / Adli El Shafei	2; 6	2; 6	2; 6
4	(Luxembourg) (Egypt)	Paul Decker; Adli El Shafei	0; 6	0; 6	1; 6
5	(Luxembourg) (Egypt)	Géza Wertheim; Marcel Coen	2; 6	6; 0	2; 6	2; 6

=== Finland vs. Yugoslavia ===
Finland
2
Helsinki, Finland
8–10 May 1952

Yugoslavia
3

			1	2	3	4	5
1	(Finland) (Socialist Federal Republic of Yugoslavia)	Sakari Salo; Vladimir Petrović	6; 8	1; 6	7; 5	6; 4	7; 5
2	(Finland) (Socialist Federal Republic of Yugoslavia)	Pentti Forsman; Josip Palada	2; 6	1; 6	0; 6
3	(Finland) (Socialist Federal Republic of Yugoslavia)	Pentti Forsman / Sakari Salo; Josip Palada / Vladimir Petrović	7; 5	3; 6	2; 6	3; 6
4	(Finland) (Socialist Federal Republic of Yugoslavia)	Pentti Forsman; Vladimir Petrović	6; 2	4; 6	6; 8	3; 6
5	(Finland) (Socialist Federal Republic of Yugoslavia)	Sakari Salo; Ivko Plećević	6; 0	6; 1	6; 0

=== Norway vs. France ===
Norway
0
Oslo, Norway
9–11 May 1952
Clay

France
5

			1	2	3	4	5
1	(Norway) (France)	Sverre Lie; Paul Rémy	4; 6	3; 6	3; 6
2	(Norway) (France)	Nils-Erik Hessen; Bernard Destremau	1; 6	4; 6	3; 6
3	(Norway) (France)	Nils-Erik Hessen / Sverre Lie; Robert Abdesselam / Paul Rémy	1; 6	3; 6	2; 6
4	(Norway) (France)	Nils-Erik Hessen; Robert Haillet	1; 6	3; 6	3; 6
5	(Norway) (France)	Sverre Lie; Bernard Destremau	4; 6	6; 8	0; 6

=== Turkey vs. Switzerland ===
Turkey
1
Istanbul, Turkey
3–5 May 1952

Switzerland
4

			1	2	3	4	5
1	(Turkey) (Switzerland)	Nazmi Bari; Jost Spitzer	2; 6	0; 6	6; 8
2	(Turkey) (Switzerland)	Fehmi Kızıl; Erwin Balestra	6; 4	4; 6	2; 6	6; 4	4; 6
3	(Turkey) (Switzerland)	Nazmi Bari / Behbut Cevanşir; Jean-Pierre Blondel / Paul Blondel	4; 6	2; 6	7; 5	2; 6
4	(Turkey) (Switzerland)	Behbut Cevanşir; Paul Blondel	3; 6	2; 6	3; 6
5	(Turkey) (Switzerland)	Nazmi Bari; Erwin Balestra	6; 2	3; 6	6; 3	7; 5

=== Austria vs. Chile ===
Austria
1
Vienna, Austria
2–4 May 1952

Chile
4

			1	2	3	4	5
1	(Austria) (Chile)	Gustav Specht; Ricardo Balbiers	0; 6	2; 6	3; 6
2	(Austria) (Chile)	Alfred Huber; Luis Ayala	5; 7	10; 12	5; 7
3	(Austria) (Chile)	Alfred Huber / Hans Redl; Luis Ayala / Carlos San Hueza	2; 6	7; 5	6; 2	6; 4
4	(Austria) (Chile)	Hans Redl; Ricardo Balbiers	4; 6	6; 3	3; 6	6; 1	1; 6
5	(Austria) (Chile)	Gustav Specht; Luis Ayala	1; 6	2; 6	1; 6

== Second round ==
=== West Germany vs. Brazil ===
West Germany
3
Düsseldorf, West Germany
16–18 May 1952

Brazil
2

			1	2	3	4	5
1	(West Germany) (Brazil)	Ernst Buchholz; Eugenio Saller	4; 6	6; 3	6; 3	6; 4
2	(West Germany) (Brazil)	Gottfried von Cramm; Armando Vieira	8; 10	2; 6	8; 6	6; 3	1; 6
3	(West Germany) (Brazil)	Gottfried von Cramm / Rolf Göpfert; Eugenio Saller / Armando Vieira	6; 3	7; 5	6; 3
4	(West Germany) (Brazil)	Gottfried von Cramm; Eugenio Saller	6; 2	6; 2	6; 4
5	(West Germany) (Brazil)	Ernst Buchholz; Armando Vieira	8; 10	7; 5	3; 6	4; 6

=== Monaco vs. Denmark ===
Monaco
0
Monte Carlo, Monaco
16–19 May 1952
Clay

Denmark
5

			1	2	3	4	5
1	(Monaco) (Denmark)	Georges Pasquier; Kurt Nielsen	0; 6	2; 6	3; 6
2	(Monaco) (Denmark)	Aleco Noghès; Torben Ulrich	2; 6	2; 6	4; 6
3	(Monaco) (Denmark)	Aleco Noghès / Georges Pasquier; Kurt Nielsen / Torben Ulrich	6; 3	3; 6	6; 1	2; 6	1; 6
4	(Monaco) (Denmark)	Aleco Noghès; Kurt Nielsen	2; 6	3; 6	4; 6
5	(Monaco) (Denmark)	Georges Pasquier; Torben Ulrich	6; 0	2; 6	1; 6	6; 3	0; 6

=== Italy vs. Egypt ===
Italy
5
Foro Italico, Rome, Italy
16–18 May 1952
Clay

Egypt
0

			1	2	3	4	5
1	(Italy) (Egypt)	Rolando del Bello; Marcel Coen	6; 1	7; 5	6; 1
2	(Italy) (Egypt)	Fausto Gardini; Adli El Shafei	6; 0	6; 3	6; 3
3	(Italy) (Egypt)	Marcello del Bello / Giovanni Cucelli; Marcel Coen / Adli El Shafei	6; 2	6; 3	6; 2
4	(Italy) (Egypt)	Fausto Gardini; Marcel Coen	6; 0	6; 1	6; 1
5	(Italy) (Egypt)	Rolando del Bello; Adli El Shafei	7; 5	7; 5	2; 6	7; 5

=== Yugoslavia vs. Great Britain ===
Yugoslavia
2
Belgrade, Yugoslavia
17–19 May 1952
Clay

Great Britain
3

			1	2	3	4	5
1	(Socialist Federal Republic of Yugoslavia) (United Kingdom)	Vladimir Petrović; Tony Mottram	6; 8	1; 6	2; 6
2	(Socialist Federal Republic of Yugoslavia) (United Kingdom)	Josip Palada; Geoffrey Paish	9; 7	6; 8	6; 3	7; 5
3	(Socialist Federal Republic of Yugoslavia) (United Kingdom)	Stefan Laslo / Josip Palada; Colin Gregory / Tony Mottram	4; 6	6; 1	11; 9	2; 6	2; 6
4	(Socialist Federal Republic of Yugoslavia) (United Kingdom)	Vladimir Petrović; Roger Becker	6; 1	2; 6	4; 6	6; 2	6; 1
5	(Socialist Federal Republic of Yugoslavia) (United Kingdom)	Josip Palada; Tony Mottram	3; 6	5; 7	2; 6

=== France vs. Netherlands ===
France
4
Stade Roland Garros, Paris, France
16–18 May 1952
Clay

Netherlands
1

			1	2	3	4	5
1	(France) (Netherlands)	Bernard Destremau; Hubert Wilton	3; 6	6; 8	6; 1	2; 6
2	(France) (Netherlands)	Paul Rémy; Hans van Swol	6; 1	6; 2	1; 6	6; 3
3	(France) (Netherlands)	Robert Abdesselam / Paul Rémy; Ivo Rinkel / Hans van Swol	6; 1	6; 4	6; 3
4	(France) (Netherlands)	Bernard Destremau; Hans van Swol	5; 7	7; 5	6; 1	7; 5
5	(France) (Netherlands)	Robert Haillet; Hubert Wilton	6; 2	3; 6	6; 2	6; 3

=== Switzerland vs. Argentina ===
Switzerland
0
Lausanne, Switzerland
17–19 May 1952

Argentina
5

			1	2	3	4	5
1	(Switzerland) (Argentina)	Jost Spitzer; Enrique Morea	2; 6	2; 6	3; 6
2	(Switzerland) (Argentina)	Max Albrecht; Alejo Russell	2; 6	6; 2	1; 6	2; 6
3	(Switzerland) (Argentina)	Jean-Pierre Blondel / Paul Blondel; Enrique Morea / Alejo Russell	3; 6	2; 6	4; 6
4	(Switzerland) (Argentina)	Paul Blondel; Salvador Soriano	2; 6	2; 6	2; 6
5	(Switzerland) (Argentina)	Jost Spitzer; Alejo Russell	2; 6	3; 6	8; 6	1; 6

=== Sweden vs. Chile ===
Sweden
5
Solna Tennisstadion, Solna, Sweden
16–18 May 1952
Clay

Chile
0

			1	2	3	4	5
1	(Sweden) (Chile)	Sven Davidson; Luis Ayala	4; 6	3; 6	7; 5	8; 6	6; 1
2	(Sweden) (Chile)	Torsten Johansson; Ricardo Balbiers	6; 4	7; 5	6; 4
3	(Sweden) (Chile)	Torsten Johansson / Nils Rohlsson; Luis Ayala / Ricardo Balbiers	6; 3	2; 6	6; 3	4; 6	6; 4
4	(Sweden) (Chile)	Torsten Johansson; Luis Ayala	3; 6	6; 2	6; 4	6; 2
5	(Sweden) (Chile)	Åke Eliaeson; Ricardo Balbiers	6; 2	3; 6	6; 3	3; 6	6; 4

=== Belgium vs. Hungary ===
Belgium
4
Brussels, Belgium
16–18 May 1952

Hungary
1

			1	2	3	4	5
1	(Belgium) (Hungary)	Jacques Brichant; András Ádám-Stolpa	3; 6	5; 7	8; 6	6; 2	5; 7
2	(Belgium) (Hungary)	Philippe Washer; József Asbóth	6; 2	6; 0	6; 4
3	(Belgium) (Hungary)	Jacques Brichant / Philippe Washer; András Ádám-Stolpa / József Asbóth	6; 3	6; 4	6; 4
4	(Belgium) (Hungary)	Philippe Washer; András Ádám-Stolpa	6; 4	6; 2	6; 0
5	(Belgium) (Hungary)	Jacques Brichant; József Asbóth	3; 6	7; 5	6; 4	6; 0

== Quarterfinals ==
=== Denmark vs. West Germany ===
Denmark
4
Copenhagen, Denmark
13–15 June 1952
Clay

West Germany
1

			1	2	3	4	5
1	(Denmark) (West Germany)	Kurt Nielsen; Ernst Buchholz	7; 5	6; 2	6; 4
2	(Denmark) (West Germany)	Torben Ulrich; Horst Hermann	1; 6	3; 6	2; 6
3	(Denmark) (West Germany)	Kurt Nielsen / Torben Ulrich; Rolf Göpfert / Horst Hermann	7; 9	14; 16	8; 6	6; 3	6; 3
4	(Denmark) (West Germany)	Torben Ulrich; Ernst Buchholz	6; 3	6; 3	6; 0
5	(Denmark) (West Germany)	Kurt Nielsen; Horst Hermann	6; 3	6; 3	6; 2

=== Italy vs. Great Britain ===
Italy
4
Bologna, Italy
13–15 June 1952
Clay

Great Britain
1

			1	2	3	4	5
1	(Italy) (United Kingdom)	Rolando del Bello; Tony Mottram	8; 6	6; 2	6; 2
2	(Italy) (United Kingdom)	Fausto Gardini; Geoffrey Paish	6; 2	6; 3	6; 3
3	(Italy) (United Kingdom)	Marcello del Bello / Giovanni Cucelli; Tony Mottram / Geoffrey Paish	3; 6	1; 6	8; 6	2; 6
4	(Italy) (United Kingdom)	Fausto Gardini; Tony Mottram	4; 6	4; 6	6; 3	6; 1	6; 0
5	(Italy) (United Kingdom)	Rolando del Bello; Geoffrey Paish	6; 3	6; 4	6; 2

=== France vs. Argentina ===
France
3
Stade Roland Garros, Paris, France
13–15 June 1952
Clay

Argentina
2

			1	2	3	4	5
1	(France) (Argentina)	Bernard Destremau; Enrique Morea	2; 6	2; 6	2; 6
2	(France) (Argentina)	Paul Rémy; Alejo Russell	6; 4	7; 5	6; 3
3	(France) (Argentina)	Robert Abdesselam / Paul Rémy; Enrique Morea / Alejo Russell	6; 2	6; 4	6; 4
4	(France) (Argentina)	Bernard Destremau; Alejo Russell	5; 7	6; 3	6; 3	6; 4
5	(France) (Argentina)	Paul Rémy; Enrique Morea	4; 6	5; 7	3; 6

=== Belgium vs. Sweden ===
Belgium
3
Royal Léopold Club, Brussels, Belgium
14–16 June 1952
Clay

Sweden
2

			1	2	3	4	5
1	(Belgium) (Sweden)	Philippe Washer; Torsten Johansson	1; 6	6; 3	7; 5	6; 4
2	(Belgium) (Sweden)	Jacques Brichant; Sven Davidson	6; 4	8; 6	7; 5
3	(Belgium) (Sweden)	Jacques Brichant / Philippe Washer; Torsten Johansson / Nils Rohlsson	3; 6	6; 2	6; 1	7; 5
4	(Belgium) (Sweden)	Jacques Brichant; Torsten Johansson	1; 6	3; 6	2; 6
5	(Belgium) (Sweden)	Philippe Washer; Sven Davidson	6; 1	7; 5	5; 7			retired

== Semifinals ==
=== Italy vs. Denmark ===
Italy
4
Milan, Italy
11–13 July 1952
Clay

Denmark
1

			1	2	3	4	5
1	(Italy) (Denmark)	Rolando del Bello; Torben Ulrich	6; 4	6; 4	6; 3
2	(Italy) (Denmark)	Fausto Gardini; Kurt Nielsen	8; 6	6; 4	6; 4
3	(Italy) (Denmark)	Marcello del Bello / Giovanni Cucelli; Kurt Nielsen / Torben Ulrich	8; 6	6; 4	2; 6	4; 6	6; 0
4	(Italy) (Denmark)	Fausto Gardini; Torben Ulrich	6; 0	6; 4	7; 5
5	(Italy) (Denmark)	Rolando del Bello; Kurt Nielsen	3; 6	1; 6	4; 6

=== France vs. Belgium ===
France
2
Stade Roland Garros, Paris, France
12–14 July 1952
Clay

Belgium
3

			1	2	3	4	5
1	(France) (Belgium)	Paul Rémy; Jacques Brichant	3; 6	3; 6	10; 8	6; 4	6; 1
2	(France) (Belgium)	Robert Abdesselam; Philippe Washer	5; 7	1; 6	3; 6
3	(France) (Belgium)	Marcel Bernard / Paul Rémy; Jacques Brichant / Philippe Washer	6; 1	6; 2	1; 6	4; 6	6; 1
4	(France) (Belgium)	Paul Rémy; Philippe Washer	0; 6	0; 6	3; 6
5	(France) (Belgium)	Robert Abdesselam; Jacques Brichant	6; 8	8; 6	13; 15	1; 6

== Final ==
=== Italy vs. Belgium ===
Italy
3
Milan, Italy
25–28 July 1952
Clay

Belgium
1

			1	2	3	4	5
1	(Italy) (Belgium)	Rolando del Bello; Jacques Brichant	7; 5	1; 6	5; 7	6; 0	4; 6
2	(Italy) (Belgium)	Fausto Gardini; Philippe Washer	8; 6	6; 1	3; 6	2; 6	6; 4
3	(Italy) (Belgium)	Marcello del Bello / Giovanni Cucelli; Jacques Brichant / Philippe Washer	6; 3	6; 1	5; 7	3; 6	6; 3
4	(Italy) (Belgium)	Fausto Gardini; Jacques Brichant	4; 6	6; 1	0; 6	6; 2	6; 2
5	(Italy) (Belgium)	Rolando del Bello; Philippe Washer	3; 3					not completed
