= 1964 Davis Cup Europe Zone =

International tennis competition

The Europe Zone was one of the three regional zones of the 1964 Davis Cup.

32 teams entered the Europe Zone, with the winner going on to compete in the Inter-Zonal Zone against the winners of the America Zone and Eastern Zone. With the increase in entries, the previous year's semifinalists were no longer granted byes into the second round, however seeding was still put in place to ensure that these countries could not meet before the semifinals.

Sweden defeated France in the final and progressed to the Inter-Zonal Zone.

== Draw ==
First Round; 28 April–3 May
Great Britain	5
Austria	0
Ireland	3
Switzerland	2
Yugoslavia	3
Luxembourg	0
Turkey	0
Argentina	5
South Africa	w/o
Poland
Portugal	1
Norway	4
France	5
Bulgaria	0
Hungary	2
Netherlands	3
Morocco	1
Soviet Union	4
Belgium	0
West Germany	5
Denmark	5
Finland	0
Brazil	1
Spain	4
Israel	1
Rhodesia	4
Egypt	1
Italy	4
Czechoslovakia	w/o
Romania
Greece	1
Sweden	4

Second Round; 10–18 May
Eastbourne, England (grass)
Great Britain	5
Ireland	0
Belgrade, Yugoslavia
Yugoslavia	5
Argentina	0
Oslo, Norway (clay)
South Africa	5
Norway	0
Paris, France (clay)
France	5
Netherlands	0
Düsseldorf, West Germany
Soviet Union	1
West Germany	4
Copenhagen, Denmark (clay)
Denmark	3
Spain	2
Genoa, Italy (clay)
Rhodesia	0
Italy	5
Prague, Czechoslovakia (clay)
Czechoslovakia	0
Sweden	5

Quarterfinals; 11–14 June
Manchester, England (grass)
Great Britain	3
Yugoslavia	2
Paris, France (clay)
South Africa	2
France	3
Munich, West Germany (clay)
West Germany	4
Denmark	1
Turin, Italy (clay)
Italy	1
Sweden	3

Semifinals; 16–19 July
Bristol, England (grass)
Great Britain	2
France	3
Båstad, Sweden (clay)
West Germany	2
Sweden	3

Final; 31 July–3 August
Båstad, Sweden (clay)
France	1
Sweden	4

== First round ==
=== Great Britain vs. Austria ===
Great Britain
5
Tally Ho! Lawn Tennis Club, Birmingham, England
30 April–2 May 1964
Clay

Austria
0

			1	2	3	4	5
1	(United Kingdom) (Austria)	Billy Knight; Detlef Herdy	6; 0	6; 4	6; 1
2	(United Kingdom) (Austria)	Roger Taylor; Ernst Blanke	6; 2	6; 2	6; 4
3	(United Kingdom) (Austria)	Alan Mills / Mike Sangster; Detlef Herdy / Peter Pokorny	6; 2	6; 3	3; 6	3; 6	7; 5
4	(United Kingdom) (Austria)	Roger Taylor; Peter Pokorny	5; 7	7; 5	6; 3	6; 2
5	(United Kingdom) (Austria)	Billy Knight; Ernst Blanke	6; 0	6; 0	6; 2

=== Ireland vs. Switzerland ===
Ireland
3
Dublin, Ireland
1–3 May 1964

Switzerland
2

			1	2	3	4	5
1	(Republic of Ireland) (Switzerland)	Peter Jackson; Dimitri Sturdza	15; 17	6; 4	3; 6	6; 4	2; 6
2	(Republic of Ireland) (Switzerland)	Derek Arthurs; Jurg Siegrist	7; 5	6; 4	7; 5
3	(Republic of Ireland) (Switzerland)	Derek Arthurs / Guy Jackson; Dimitri Sturdza / Matthias Werren	3; 6	5; 7	5; 7
4	(Republic of Ireland) (Switzerland)	Peter Jackson; Jurg Siegrist	6; 3	6; 4	6; 4
5	(Republic of Ireland) (Switzerland)	Derek Arthurs; Dimitri Sturdza	3; 6	6; 4	4; 6	7; 5	6; 3

=== Yugoslavia vs. Luxembourg ===
Yugoslavia
3
Belgrade, Yugoslavia
28–30 April 1964

Luxembourg
0

			1	2	3	4	5
1	(Socialist Federal Republic of Yugoslavia) (Luxembourg)	Boro Jovanović; Frank Baden	6; 2	6; 0	6; 4
2	(Socialist Federal Republic of Yugoslavia) (Luxembourg)	Nikola Pilić; Joseph Offenheim	6; 1	6; 0	6; 1
3	(Socialist Federal Republic of Yugoslavia) (Luxembourg)	Boro Jovanović / Nikola Pilić; Frank Baden / Joseph Offenheim	6; 1	6; 0	6; 4
4	(Socialist Federal Republic of Yugoslavia) (Luxembourg)	Boro Jovanović; Joseph Offenheim						not played
5	(Socialist Federal Republic of Yugoslavia) (Luxembourg)	Nikola Pilić; Frank Baden						not played

=== Turkey vs. Argentina ===
Turkey
0
Istanbul, Turkey
1–3 May 1964

Argentina
5

			1	2	3	4	5
1	(Turkey) (Argentina)	Nazmi Bari; Eduardo Soriano	4; 6	1; 6	3; 6
2	(Turkey) (Argentina)	Ziya Kipkizilorenli; Roberto Aubone	0; 6	1; 6	2; 6
3	(Turkey) (Argentina)	Engin Balas / Nazmi Bari; Roberto Aubone / Eduardo Soriano	0; 6	2; 6	2; 6
4	(Turkey) (Argentina)	Ziya Kipkizilorenli; Eduardo Soriano	1; 6	0; 6	0; 6
5	(Turkey) (Argentina)	Nazmi Bari; Roberto Aubone	2; 6	4; 6

=== Norway vs. Portugal ===
Norway
4
Oslo, Norway
1–3 May 1964
Clay

Portugal
1

			1	2	3	4	5
1	(Norway) (Portugal)	Gunnar Høst Sjøwall; David Cohen	6; 4	6; 2	6; 1
2	(Norway) (Portugal)	Finn Søhol; Alfredo Vaz Pinto	2; 6	3; 6	2; 6
3	(Norway) (Portugal)	Jarl Bibow / Finn-Dag Jagge; João Roquette / Alfredo Vaz Pinto	6; 0	6; 3	6; 3
4	(Norway) (Portugal)	Gunnar Høst Sjøwall; Alfredo Vaz Pinto	9; 11	8; 6	7; 5	7; 5
5	(Norway) (Portugal)	Finn Søhol; David Cohen	3; 6	6; 2	6; 3	6; 3

=== France vs. Bulgaria ===
France
5
Club de Tennis Dijon, Dijon, France
1–3 May 1964
Clay

Bulgaria
0

			1	2	3	4	5
1	(France) (Bulgaria)	Pierre Darmon; Nikolai Chuparov	6; 0	6; 1	6; 0
2	(France) (Bulgaria)	Pierre Barthès; Rangel Rangelov	6; 0	6; 2	6; 0
3	(France) (Bulgaria)	Patrice Beust / Daniel Contet; Nikolai Chuparov / Rangel Rangelov	6; 3	6; 4	6; 4
4	(France) (Bulgaria)	Pierre Darmon; Rangel Rangelov	6; 4	6; 3	6; 3
5	(France) (Bulgaria)	Pierre Barthès; Nikolai Chuparov	6; 1	6; 1	6; 3

=== Netherlands vs. Hungary ===
Netherlands
3
The Hague, Netherlands
1–3 May 1964
Clay

Hungary
2

			1	2	3	4	5
1	(Netherlands) (Hungary)	Tom Okker; István Gulyás	3; 6	1; 6	3; 6
2	(Netherlands) (Hungary)	Jan Hajer; András Szikszay	2; 6	4; 6	9; 7	8; 6	6; 2
3	(Netherlands) (Hungary)	Jan Hajer / Tom Okker; István Gulyás / András Szikszay	6; 3	1; 6	2; 6	9; 7	6; 1
4	(Netherlands) (Hungary)	Tom Okker; András Szikszay	6; 4	3; 6	6; 3	6; 3
5	(Netherlands) (Hungary)	Jan Hajer; István Gulyás	2; 6	2; 6	1; 6

=== Morocco vs. Soviet Union ===
Morocco
1
Casablanca, Morocco
1–3 May 1964

Soviet Union
4

			1	2	3	4	5
1	(Morocco) (Soviet Union)	Lahcen Chadli; Toomas Leius	2; 6	6; 8	4; 6
2	(Morocco) (Soviet Union)	Mohammed-Haibabi Bouchaib; Alex Metreveli	7; 5	2; 6	8; 6	6; 1
3	(Morocco) (Soviet Union)	Mohammed-Haibabi Bouchaib / Lahcen Chadli; Toomas Leius / Sergei Likhachev	3; 6	3; 6	1; 6
4	(Morocco) (Soviet Union)	Lahcen Chadli; Alex Metreveli	6; 8	1; 6	6; 4	4; 6
5	(Morocco) (Soviet Union)	Mohammed-Haibabi Bouchaib; Toomas Leius	0; 6	6; 2	2; 6	4; 6

=== Belgium vs. West Germany ===
Belgium
0
Brussels, Belgium
1–3 May 1964

West Germany
5

			1	2	3	4	5
1	(Belgium) (West Germany)	Claude De Gronckel; Ingo Buding	6; 4	6; 3	4; 6	4; 6	1; 6
2	(Belgium) (West Germany)	Eric Drossart; Christian Kuhnke	4; 6	4; 6	6; 1	3; 6
3	(Belgium) (West Germany)	Jacques Brichant / Eric Drossart; Wilhelm Bungert / Wolfgang Stuck	4; 6	4; 6	2; 6
4	(Belgium) (West Germany)	Claude De Gronckel; Wilhelm Bungert	6; 2	4; 6	5; 7	4; 6
5	(Belgium) (West Germany)	Eric Drossart; Ingo Buding	10; 8	3; 6	9; 11	2; 6

=== Denmark vs. Finland ===
Denmark
5
Copenhagen, Denmark
1–3 May 1964
Clay

Finland
0

			1	2	3	4	5
1	(Denmark) (Finland)	Jørgen Ulrich; Heikki Hedman	5; 7	6; 4	6; 4	7; 5
2	(Denmark) (Finland)	Torben Ulrich; Reino Nyyssönen	6; 1	4; 6	3; 6	8; 6	6; 4
3	(Denmark) (Finland)	Jan Leschly / Jørgen Ulrich; Reino Nyyssönen / Pekka Säilä	6; 0	6; 2	2; 6	6; 1
4	(Denmark) (Finland)	Jørgen Ulrich; Reino Nyyssönen	7; 5	6; 4	6; 3
5	(Denmark) (Finland)	Torben Ulrich; Heikki Hedman	6; 1	6; 3	6; 2

=== Spain vs. Brazil ===
Spain
4
Real Club de Tenis, Barcelona, Spain
1–3 May 1964
Clay

Brazil
1

			1	2	3	4	5
1	(Spain) (Brazil)	Juan Manuel Couder; Thomaz Koch	4; 6	6; 8	2; 6
2	(Spain) (Brazil)	Manuel Santana; Ronald Barnes	6; 1	6; 0	7; 5
3	(Spain) (Brazil)	José Luis Arilla / Manuel Santana; Ronald Barnes / Thomaz Koch	6; 4	7; 5	4; 6	7; 5
4	(Spain) (Brazil)	Manuel Santana; Thomaz Koch	6; 4	6; 3	6; 1
5	(Spain) (Brazil)	Juan Manuel Couder; Ronald Barnes	6; 1	9; 7	7; 5

=== Israel vs. Rhodesia ===
Israel
1
Tel Aviv, Israel
1–3 May 1964
Hard

Rhodesia
4

			1	2	3	4	5
1	(Israel) (Rhodesia)	Gabriel Dubitzky; Frank Saloman	3; 6	1; 6	0; 6
2	(Israel) (Rhodesia)	Eleazar Davidman; Adrian Bey	6; 2	3; 6	0; 6	3; 6
3	(Israel) (Rhodesia)	Eleazar Davidman / Gabriel Dubitzky; Adrian Bey / Frank Saloman	4; 6	8; 10	5; 7
4	(Israel) (Rhodesia)	Eleazar Davidman; Frank Saloman	6; 1	5; 7	6; 4	1; 6	6; 3
5	(Israel) (Rhodesia)	David Asz; Adrian Bey	2; 6	1; 6	1; 6

=== Italy vs. Egypt ===
Italy
4
Bari, Italy
1–3 May 1964
Clay

Egypt
1

			1	2	3	4	5
1	(Italy) (Egypt)	Sergio Tacchini; Fathi Mohammed-Ali	6; 2	6; 2	6; 1
2	(Italy) (Egypt)	Nicola Pietrangeli; Mabrouk Mohammed-Ali	6; 4	7; 5	6; 2
3	(Italy) (Egypt)	Nicola Pietrangeli / Sergio Tacchini; Fathi Mohammed-Ali / Mabrouk Mohammed-Ali	6; 2	6; 3	6; 2
4	(Italy) (Egypt)	Sergio Tacchini; Mabrouk Mohammed-Ali	7; 5	4; 6	4; 6	6; 3	3; 6
5	(Italy) (Egypt)	Giordano Maioli; Fathi Mohammed-Ali	6; 2	6; 3	6; 2

=== Greece vs. Sweden ===
Greece
1
Athens, Greece
28–30 April 1964
Clay

Sweden
4

			1	2	3	4	5
1	(Greece) (Sweden)	Nicholas Kalogeropoulos; Ulf Schmidt	6; 8	2; 6	3; 6
2	(Greece) (Sweden)	Nikolaos Kalyvas; Jan-Erik Lundqvist	2; 6	5; 7	0; 6
3	(Greece) (Sweden)	Nicholas Kalogeropoulos / Nikolaos Kalyvas; Jan-Erik Lundqvist / Ulf Schmidt	3; 6	3; 6	3; 6
4	(Greece) (Sweden)	Nicholas Kalogeropoulos; Bo Holmström	6; 2	6; 4	6; 2
5	(Greece) (Sweden)	Nikolaos Kalyvas; Ulf Schmidt	4; 6	6; 1	6; 3	3; 6	0; 6

== Second round ==
=== Great Britain vs. Ireland ===
Great Britain
5
Devonshire Park Lawn Tennis Club, Eastbourne, England
14–16 May 1964
Grass

Ireland
0

			1	2	3	4	5
1	(United Kingdom) (Republic of Ireland)	Mike Sangster; Derek Arthurs	6; 2	6; 2	6; 2
2	(United Kingdom) (Republic of Ireland)	Billy Knight; Peter Jackson	6; 0	6; 0	6; 1
3	(United Kingdom) (Republic of Ireland)	Billy Knight / Mike Sangster; Derek Arthurs / Michael Hickey	6; 3	6; 4	6; 2
4	(United Kingdom) (Republic of Ireland)	Billy Knight; Derek Arthurs	6; 1	6; 2	3; 6	6; 1
5	(United Kingdom) (Republic of Ireland)	Mike Sangster; Peter Jackson	6; 2	6; 4	6; 2

=== Yugoslavia vs. Argentina ===
Yugoslavia
5
Belgrade, Yugoslavia
14–16 May 1964

Argentina
0

			1	2	3	4	5
1	(Socialist Federal Republic of Yugoslavia) (Argentina)	Boro Jovanović; Eduardo Soriano	3; 6	6; 4	6; 1	6; 3
2	(Socialist Federal Republic of Yugoslavia) (Argentina)	Nikola Pilić; Roberto Aubone	6; 3	6; 1	6; 2
3	(Socialist Federal Republic of Yugoslavia) (Argentina)	Boro Jovanović / Nikola Pilić; Roberto Aubone / Eduardo Soriano	7; 5	4; 6	5; 7	6; 3	7; 5
4	(Socialist Federal Republic of Yugoslavia) (Argentina)	Boro Jovanović; Roberto Aubone	6; 1	6; 1	6; 3
5	(Socialist Federal Republic of Yugoslavia) (Argentina)	Nikola Pilić; Eduardo Soriano	6; 4	6; 4	7; 5

=== Norway vs. South Africa ===
Norway
0
Oslo, Norway
13–15 May 1964
Clay

South Africa
5

			1	2	3	4	5
1	(Norway) (South Africa)	Finn-Dag Jagge; Keith Diepraam	1; 6	2; 6	3; 6
2	(Norway) (South Africa)	Sjur Lars Galtung-Hansen; Cliff Drysdale	3; 6	0; 6	2; 6
3	(Norway) (South Africa)	Sjur Lars Galtung-Hansen / Finn-Dag Jagge; Keith Diepraam / Cliff Drysdale	1; 6	4; 6	8; 10
4	(Norway) (South Africa)	Sjur Lars Galtung-Hansen; Keith Diepraam	2; 6	4; 6	2; 6
5	(Norway) (South Africa)	Finn-Dag Jagge; Cliff Drysdale	3; 6	2; 6	2; 6

=== France vs. Netherlands ===
France
5
Stade Roland Garros, Paris, France
15–17 May 1964
Clay

Netherlands
0

			1	2	3	4	5
1	(France) (Netherlands)	Pierre Darmon; Jan Hajer	7; 5	6; 0	6; 2
2	(France) (Netherlands)	Pierre Barthès; Tom Okker	6; 1	6; 4	7; 5
3	(France) (Netherlands)	Daniel Contet / Pierre Darmon; Jan Hajer / Tom Okker	6; 3	13; 11	3; 6	6; 3
4	(France) (Netherlands)	Pierre Darmon; Tom Okker	6; 3	4; 6	6; 1	6; 1
5	(France) (Netherlands)	Pierre Barthès; Jan Hajer	6; 3	6; 1	6; 1

=== West Germany vs. Soviet Union ===
West Germany
4
Düsseldorf, West Germany
16–18 May 1964

Soviet Union
1

			1	2	3	4	5
1	(West Germany) (Soviet Union)	Ingo Buding; Toomas Leius	6; 2	6; 3	2; 6	6; 4
2	(West Germany) (Soviet Union)	Christian Kuhnke; Alex Metreveli	6; 3	6; 4	6; 2
3	(West Germany) (Soviet Union)	Wilhelm Bungert / Christian Kuhnke; Toomas Leius / Sergei Likhachev	6; 4	3; 6	3; 6	3; 6
4	(West Germany) (Soviet Union)	Christian Kuhnke; Toomas Leius	9; 7	6; 4	6; 3
5	(West Germany) (Soviet Union)	Ingo Buding; Alex Metreveli	9; 7	11; 9	6; 0

=== Denmark vs. Spain ===
Denmark
3
Copenhagen, Denmark
10–12 May 1964
Clay

Spain
2

			1	2	3	4	5
1	(Denmark) (Spain)	Jørgen Ulrich; Manuel Santana	0; 6	1; 6	2; 6
2	(Denmark) (Spain)	Jan Leschly; Juan Manuel Couder	1; 6	6; 8	6; 3	6; 2	6; 4
3	(Denmark) (Spain)	Jan Leschly / Jørgen Ulrich; José Luis Arilla / Manuel Santana	6; 3	4; 6	6; 4	6; 4
4	(Denmark) (Spain)	Jørgen Ulrich; Juan Manuel Couder	6; 4	5; 7	6; 4	6; 2
5	(Denmark) (Spain)	Jan Leschly; Manuel Santana	2; 6	1; 6	2; 6

=== Italy vs. Rhodesia ===
Italy
5
Genoa, Italy
15–17 May 1964
Clay

Rhodesia
0

			1	2	3	4	5
1	(Italy) (Rhodesia)	Giuseppe Merlo; Frank Saloman	6; 2	0; 6	7; 5	4; 6	7; 5
2	(Italy) (Rhodesia)	Nicola Pietrangeli; Adrian Bey	6; 2	6; 2	6; 1
3	(Italy) (Rhodesia)	Giordano Maioli / Nicola Pietrangeli; Adrian Bey / Frank Saloman	4; 6	9; 7	6; 2	3; 6	7; 5
4	(Italy) (Rhodesia)	Nicola Pietrangeli; Frank Saloman	6; 2	6; 1	6; 3
5	(Italy) (Rhodesia)	Giuseppe Merlo; Adrian Bey	6; 2	6; 3	6; 2

=== Czechoslovakia vs. Sweden ===
Czechoslovakia
0
Prague, Czechoslovakia
15–17 May 1964
Clay

Sweden
5

			1	2	3	4	5
1	(Czechoslovakia) (Sweden)	Štěpán Koudelka; Jan-Erik Lundqvist	5; 7	4; 6	0; 6
2	(Czechoslovakia) (Sweden)	Milan Holeček; Ulf Schmidt	2; 6	4; 6	4; 6
3	(Czechoslovakia) (Sweden)	Milan Holeček / Štěpán Koudelka; Jan-Erik Lundqvist / Ulf Schmidt	3; 6	11; 13	3; 6
4	(Czechoslovakia) (Sweden)	Milan Holeček; Jan-Erik Lundqvist	3; 6	3; 6	4; 6
5	(Czechoslovakia) (Sweden)	Štěpán Koudelka; Ulf Schmidt	6; 3	3; 6	2; 6	4; 6

== Quarterfinals ==
=== Great Britain vs. Yugoslavia ===
Great Britain
3
Northern Lawn Tennis Club, Manchester, England
11–13 June 1964
Grass

Yugoslavia
2

			1	2	3	4	5
1	(United Kingdom) (Socialist Federal Republic of Yugoslavia)	Mike Sangster; Boro Jovanović	6; 2	6; 4	6; 3
2	(United Kingdom) (Socialist Federal Republic of Yugoslavia)	Bobby Wilson; Nikola Pilić	6; 8	8; 6	3; 6	3; 6
3	(United Kingdom) (Socialist Federal Republic of Yugoslavia)	Mike Sangster / Bobby Wilson; Boro Jovanović / Nikola Pilić	6; 2	4; 6	6; 3	6; 2
4	(United Kingdom) (Socialist Federal Republic of Yugoslavia)	Mike Sangster; Nikola Pilić	14; 16	11; 9	3; 6	4; 6
5	(United Kingdom) (Socialist Federal Republic of Yugoslavia)	Bobby Wilson; Boro Jovanović	6; 4	7; 5	0; 6	3; 6	6; 2

=== France vs. South Africa ===
France
3
Stade Roland Garros, Paris, France
12–14 June 1964
Clay

South Africa
2

			1	2	3	4	5
1	(France) (South Africa)	Pierre Darmon; Keith Diepraam	2; 6	10; 8	6; 3	7; 9	1; 6
2	(France) (South Africa)	Pierre Barthès; Abe Segal	6; 3	8; 6	6; 8	4; 6	4; 6
3	(France) (South Africa)	Jean-Noël Grinda / François Jauffret; Keith Diepraam / Abe Segal	9; 7	6; 4	6; 2
4	(France) (South Africa)	Pierre Barthès; Keith Diepraam	6; 2	0; 6	6; 2	3; 6	6; 2
5	(France) (South Africa)	Pierre Darmon; Abe Segal	6; 2	6; 1	6; 2

=== West Germany vs. Denmark ===
West Germany
4
Munich, West Germany
12–14 June 1964
Clay

Denmark
1

			1	2	3	4	5
1	(West Germany) (Denmark)	Wilhelm Bungert; Jan Leschly	6; 1	3; 6	11; 9	6; 2
2	(West Germany) (Denmark)	Christian Kuhnke; Jørgen Ulrich	6; 2	6; 4	3; 6	6; 2
3	(West Germany) (Denmark)	Christian Kuhnke / Wolfgang Stuck; Jan Leschly / Jørgen Ulrich	3; 6	3; 6	6; 1	3; 6
4	(West Germany) (Denmark)	Wilhelm Bungert; Jørgen Ulrich	6; 4	3; 6	6; 4	6; 3
5	(West Germany) (Denmark)	Christian Kuhnke; Jan Leschly	7; 5	4; 6	6; 3	6; 4

=== Italy vs. Sweden ===
Italy
1
Turin, Italy
12–14 June 1964
Clay

Sweden
3

			1	2	3	4	5
1	(Italy) (Sweden)	Sergio Tacchini; Jan-Erik Lundqvist	3; 6	1; 6	3; 6
2	(Italy) (Sweden)	Nicola Pietrangeli; Ulf Schmidt	6; 3	6; 4	6; 1
3	(Italy) (Sweden)	Giordano Maioli / Nicola Pietrangeli; Jan-Erik Lundqvist / Ulf Schmidt	4; 6	5; 7	8; 10
4	(Italy) (Sweden)	Sergio Tacchini; Ulf Schmidt	2; 6	2; 6	6; 3	3; 6
5	(Italy) (Sweden)	Nicola Pietrangeli; Jan-Erik Lundqvist						not played

== Semifinals ==
=== Great Britain vs. France ===
Great Britain
2
Bristol Lawn Tennis Club, Bristol, England
16–18 July 1964
Grass

France
3

			1	2	3	4	5
1	(United Kingdom) (France)	Mike Sangster; Pierre Barthès	6; 3	10; 8	13; 11
2	(United Kingdom) (France)	Billy Knight; Pierre Darmon	6; 0	5; 7	2; 6	8; 6	5; 7
3	(United Kingdom) (France)	Mike Sangster / Bobby Wilson; Jean-Noël Grinda / François Jauffret	6; 4	6; 8	10; 8	6; 4
4	(United Kingdom) (France)	Mike Sangster; Pierre Darmon	10; 8	6; 3	4; 6	6; 8	2; 6
5	(United Kingdom) (France)	Billy Knight; Pierre Barthès	4; 6	4; 6	1; 6

=== Sweden vs. West Germany ===
Sweden
3
Båstad Tennis Stadium, Båstad, Sweden
17–19 July 1964
Clay

West Germany
2

			1	2	3	4	5
1	(Sweden) (West Germany)	Ulf Schmidt; Wilhelm Bungert	4; 6	1; 6	1; 6
2	(Sweden) (West Germany)	Jan-Erik Lundqvist; Christian Kuhnke	6; 4	6; 4	6; 3
3	(Sweden) (West Germany)	Jan-Erik Lundqvist / Ulf Schmidt; Wilhelm Bungert / Christian Kuhnke	6; 2	3; 6	1; 6	6; 2	2; 6
4	(Sweden) (West Germany)	Ulf Schmidt; Christian Kuhnke	3; 6	6; 4	6; 1	6; 4
5	(Sweden) (West Germany)	Jan-Erik Lundqvist; Wilhelm Bungert	3; 6	6; 3	8; 6	7; 5

== Final ==
=== Sweden vs. France ===
Sweden
4
Båstad Tennis Stadium, Båstad, Sweden
31 July–3 August 1964
Clay

France
1

			1	2	3	4	5
1	(Sweden) (France)	Ulf Schmidt; Pierre Darmon	9; 7	8; 6	4; 6	4; 6	1; 6
2	(Sweden) (France)	Jan-Erik Lundqvist; Pierre Barthès	6; 8	6; 1	6; 3	7; 5
3	(Sweden) (France)	Jan-Erik Lundqvist / Ulf Schmidt; Jean-Noël Grinda / François Jauffret	6; 4	9; 7	8; 6
4	(Sweden) (France)	Jan-Erik Lundqvist; Pierre Darmon	3; 6	7; 5	6; 4	6; 1
5	(Sweden) (France)	Ulf Schmidt; Pierre Barthès	6; 2	6; 4	6; 8	6; 2
