= 1953 Davis Cup Europe Zone =

International tennis competition

Details
- Duration: 24 April 1953 – 20 July 1953
- Teams: 24
- Categories: 1953 Davis Cup Europe Zone; 1953 Davis Cup America Zone

Champion
- Winning nation: Belgium; Qualified for: 1953 Davis Cup; Inter-Zonal Finals

The Europe Zone was one of the three regional zones of the 1953 Davis Cup.

24 teams entered the Europe Zone, with the winner going on to compete in the Inter-Zonal Zone against the winners of the America Zone and Eastern Zone. Belgium defeated Denmark in the final and progressed to the Inter-Zonal Zone.

== Draw ==
First Round; 24 April–5 May
West Germany
bye
South Africa	w/o
Monaco
France
bye
Yugoslavia	5
Switzerland	0
Denmark
bye
Egypt	1
Austria	4
Philippines
bye
Finland	4
Ireland	1
Spain	5
Israel	0
bye
Sweden
Netherlands	5
Ceylon	0
bye
Italy
Luxembourg	0
Norway	5
bye
Great Britain
Brazil
Hungary	w/o
bye
Belgium

Second Round; 13–19 May
West Berlin
West Germany	3
South Africa	2
Zagreb, Yugoslavia
France	4
Yugoslavia	1
Vienna, Austria (clay)
Denmark	5
Austria	0
Helsinki, Finland
Philippines	5
Finland	0
Barcelona, Spain (clay)
Spain	0
Sweden	5
Scheveningen, Netherlands (clay)
Netherlands	0
Italy	5
Oslo, Norway (clay)
Norway	0
Great Britain	5
Budapest, Hungary
Hungary	0
Belgium	5

Quarterfinals; 10–14 June
Paris, France (clay)
West Germany	1
France	4
Copenhagen, Denmark (clay)
Denmark	4
Philippines	1
Turin, Italy (clay)
Sweden	1
Italy	4
Brussels, Belgium (clay)
Great Britain	1
Belgium	4

Semifinals; 10–13 July
Paris, France (clay)
France	1
Denmark	4
Brussels, Belgium
Italy	2
Belgium	3

Final; 18–20 July
Copenhagen, Denmark (clay)
Denmark	2
Belgium	3

== First round ==
=== Yugoslavia vs. Switzerland ===
Yugoslavia
5
Novi Sad, Yugoslavia
2–4 May 1953

Switzerland
0

			1	2	3	4	5
1	(Socialist Federal Republic of Yugoslavia) (Switzerland)	Josip Palada; Erwin Balestra	6; 1	1; 6	6; 2	6; 4
2	(Socialist Federal Republic of Yugoslavia) (Switzerland)	Vladimir Petrović; Max Albrecht	1; 6	6; 1	6; 4	6; 2
3	(Socialist Federal Republic of Yugoslavia) (Switzerland)	Josip Palada / Vladimir Petrović; Jean-Pierre Blondel / Paul Blondel	3; 6	6; 4	7; 5	6; 4
4	(Socialist Federal Republic of Yugoslavia) (Switzerland)	Ilija Panajotović; Erwin Balestra	8; 10	6; 2	6; 2	6; 4
5	(Socialist Federal Republic of Yugoslavia) (Switzerland)	Petko Milojković; Jean-Pierre Blondel	1; 6	6; 3	4; 6			retired

=== Egypt vs. Austria ===
Egypt
1
Cairo, Egypt
24–26 April 1953

Austria
4

			1	2	3	4	5
1	(Egypt) (Austria)	Marcel Coen; Alfred Huber	2; 6	1; 6	6; 2	6; 1	6; 3
2	(Egypt) (Austria)	Adli El Shafei; Hans Redl	1; 6	2; 6	6; 1	6; 2	9; 11
3	(Egypt) (Austria)	Marcel Coen / Adli El Shafei; Alfred Huber / Hans Redl	6; 3	5; 7	1; 6	3; 6
4	(Egypt) (Austria)	Adli El Shafei; Alfred Huber	6; 3	5; 7	1; 6	3; 6
5	(Egypt) (Austria)	Marcel Coen; Hans Redl	6; 2	2; 6	4; 6	6; 3	1; 6

=== Finland vs. Ireland ===
Finland
4
Helsinki, Finland
3–5 May 1953

Ireland
1

			1	2	3	4	5
1	(Finland) (Republic of Ireland)	Pentti Forsman; Joseph Hackett	7; 5	6; 3	2; 6	1; 6	1; 6
2	(Finland) (Republic of Ireland)	Sakari Salo; Guy Jackson	6; 1	6; 2	6; 3
3	(Finland) (Republic of Ireland)	Pentti Forsman / Sakari Salo; Joseph Hackett / Guy Jackson	7; 5	6; 4	6; 4
4	(Finland) (Republic of Ireland)	Pentti Forsman; Guy Jackson	6; 2	7; 5	4; 6	3; 6	7; 5
5	(Finland) (Republic of Ireland)	Sakari Salo; Joseph Hackett	6; 3	6; 4	6; 0

=== Spain vs. Israel ===
Spain
5
Barcelona, Spain
2–4 May 1953
Clay

Israel
0

			1	2	3	4	5
1	(Spain) (Israel)	José María Draper; Arie Avidan-Weiss	2; 6	5; 7	6; 2	6; 2	6; 3
2	(Spain) (Israel)	Carlos Ferrer; Mordechai Apel	6; 1	6; 1	6; 0
3	(Spain) (Israel)	José María Draper / Fernando Olózaga; Mordechai Apel / Arie Avidan-Weiss	6; 1	6; 3	8; 6
4	(Spain) (Israel)	Emilio Martínez del Rey; Gabriel Dubitzky	6; 4	6; 1	9; 7
5	(Spain) (Israel)	Carlos Ferrer; Arie Avidan-Weiss	6; 3	6; 0	6; 3

=== Netherlands vs. Ceylon ===
Netherlands
5
Scheveningen, Netherlands
1–3 May 1953
Clay

Ceylon
0

			1	2	3	4	5
1	(Netherlands) (Dominion of Ceylon)	Hans van Swol; Doug Scharenguivel	6; 3	6; 2	6; 2
2	(Netherlands) (Dominion of Ceylon)	Hubert Wilton; Percy Ernst	6; 2	6; 2	5; 7	6; 3
3	(Netherlands) (Dominion of Ceylon)	Hans van Swol / Hubert Wilton; Donald Fonseca / Doug Scharenguivel	6; 2	7; 5	6; 3
4	(Netherlands) (Dominion of Ceylon)	Hubert Wilton; Doug Scharenguivel	3; 6	1; 6	7; 5	6; 1	7; 5
5	(Netherlands) (Dominion of Ceylon)	Hans van Swol; Percy Ernst	6; 4	6; 0	6; 3

=== Luxembourg vs. Norway ===
Luxembourg
0
Mondorf-les-Bains, Luxembourg
1–3 May 1953
Clay

Norway
5

			1	2	3	4	5
1	(Luxembourg) (Norway)	Gaston Wampach; Nils-Erik Hessen	2; 6	6; 4	6; 3	8; 10	3; 6
2	(Luxembourg) (Norway)	Géza Wertheim; Rolf Pape	3; 6	2; 6	1; 6
3	(Luxembourg) (Norway)	Gaston Wampach / Géza Wertheim; Nils-Erik Hessen / Rolf Pape	1; 6	13; 15	3; 6
4	(Luxembourg) (Norway)	Géza Wertheim; Finn Søhol	3; 6	4; 6	1; 6
5	(Luxembourg) (Norway)	Gaston Wampach; Rolf Pape	3; 6	4; 6	2; 6

== Second round ==
=== West Germany vs. South Africa ===
West Germany
3
West Berlin
15–17 May 1953

South Africa
2

			1	2	3	4	5
1	(West Germany) (South Africa)	Engelbert Koch; Ian Vermaak	6; 8	6; 3	6; 4	6; 2
2	(West Germany) (South Africa)	Gottfried von Cramm; Russell Seymour	6; 1	6; 2	7; 5
3	(West Germany) (South Africa)	Rolf Göpfert / Horst Hermann; Russell Seymour / Bryan Woodroffe	6; 3	6; 3	2; 6	4; 6	5; 7
4	(West Germany) (South Africa)	Gottfried von Cramm; Ian Vermaak	6; 1	6; 3	6; 1
5	(West Germany) (South Africa)	Engelbert Koch; Russell Seymour	4; 6	6; 4	4; 6	4; 6

=== Yugoslavia vs. France ===
Yugoslavia
1
Zagreb, Yugoslavia
15–17 May 1953

France
4

			1	2	3	4	5
1	(Socialist Federal Republic of Yugoslavia) (France)	Josip Palada; Paul Rémy	2; 6	2; 6	8; 6	4; 6
2	(Socialist Federal Republic of Yugoslavia) (France)	Vladimir Petrović; Robert Haillet	3; 6	9; 7	4; 6	8; 6	6; 8
3	(Socialist Federal Republic of Yugoslavia) (France)	Petko Milojković / Vladimir Petrović; Marcel Bernard / Paul Rémy	2; 6	4; 6	7; 9
4	(Socialist Federal Republic of Yugoslavia) (France)	Vladimir Petrović; Robert Abdesselam	8; 6	6; 2	6; 1
5	(Socialist Federal Republic of Yugoslavia) (France)	Ilija Panajotović; Robert Haillet	6; 3	2; 6	4; 6	1; 6

=== Austria vs. Denmark ===
Austria
0
Vienna, Austria
13–15 May 1953
Clay

Denmark
5

			1	2	3	4	5
1	(Austria) (Denmark)	Hans Redl; Kurt Nielsen	1; 6	1; 6	2; 6
2	(Austria) (Denmark)	Alfred Huber; Torben Ulrich	6; 3	5; 7	3; 6	4; 6
3	(Austria) (Denmark)	Alfred Huber / Hans Redl; Kurt Nielsen / Torben Ulrich	4; 6	6; 3	6; 4	4; 6	1; 6
4	(Austria) (Denmark)	Hans Redl; Torben Ulrich	4; 6	3; 6	6; 2	4; 6
5	(Austria) (Denmark)	Alfred Huber; Kurt Nielsen	5; 7	1; 6	8; 10

=== Finland vs. Philippines ===
Finland
0
Helsinki, Finland
15–17 May 1953

Philippines
5

			1	2	3	4	5
1	(Finland) (Philippines)	Pentti Forsman; Raymundo Deyro	3; 6	2; 6	6; 4	0; 6
2	(Finland) (Philippines)	Sakari Salo; Felicisimo Ampon	0; 6	2; 6	1; 6
3	(Finland) (Philippines)	Pentti Forsman / Sakari Salo; Felicisimo Ampon / Raymundo Deyro	3; 6	0; 6	2; 6
4	(Finland) (Philippines)	Sakari Salo; Raymundo Deyro	3; 6	2; 6	6; 3	6; 3	6; 8
5	(Finland) (Philippines)	Pentti Forsman; Felicisimo Ampon	2; 6	0; 6	0; 6

=== Spain vs. Sweden ===
Spain
0
Real Club de Tenis Barcelona, Barcelona, Spain
14–17 May 1953
Clay

Sweden
5

			1	2	3	4	5
1	(Spain) (Sweden)	José María Draper; Lennart Bergelin	3; 6	1; 6	4; 6
2	(Spain) (Sweden)	Carlos Ferrer; Sven Davidson	4; 6	6; 2	6; 3	1; 6	1; 6
3	(Spain) (Sweden)	José María Draper / Fernando Olózaga; Sven Davidson / Torsten Johansson	2; 6	0; 6	2; 6
4	(Spain) (Sweden)	Emilio Martínez del Rey; Sven Davidson	4; 6	8; 10	5; 7
5	(Spain) (Sweden)	Carlos Ferrer; Lennart Bergelin	2; 6	1; 6	6; 4	2; 6

=== Netherlands vs. Italy ===
Netherlands
0
Scheveningen, Netherlands
14–16 May 1953
Clay

Italy
5

			1	2	3	4	5
1	(Netherlands) (Italy)	Hubert Wilton; Giuseppe Merlo	3; 6	2; 6	1; 6
2	(Netherlands) (Italy)	Hans van Swol; Rolando del Bello	4; 6	6; 1	3; 6	6; 3	1; 6
3	(Netherlands) (Italy)	Hans van Swol / Hubert Wilton; Marcello del Bello / Orlando Sirola	2; 6	5; 7	1; 6
4	(Netherlands) (Italy)	Boebi van Meegeren; Rolando del Bello	6; 4	1; 6	2; 6	3; 6
5	(Netherlands) (Italy)	Hans van Swol; Giuseppe Merlo	6; 0	6; 2	5; 7	4; 6	5; 7

=== Norway vs. Great Britain ===
Norway
0
Oslo, Norway
17–19 May 1953
Clay

Great Britain
5

			1	2	3	4	5
1	(Norway) (United Kingdom)	Rolf Pape; Geoffrey Paish	6; 4	0; 6	3; 6	2; 6
2	(Norway) (United Kingdom)	Sverre Lie; Tony Mottram	3; 6	2; 6	1; 6
3	(Norway) (United Kingdom)	Nils-Erik Hessen / Rolf Pape; Tony Mottram / Geoffrey Paish	5; 7	0; 6	3; 6
4	(Norway) (United Kingdom)	Rolf Pape; Tony Mottram	2; 6	3; 6	1; 6
5	(Norway) (United Kingdom)	Nils-Erik Hessen; Gerald Oakley	4; 6	2; 6	0; 6

=== Hungary vs. Belgium ===
Hungary
0
Budapest, Hungary
14–16 May 1953

Belgium
5

			1	2	3	4	5
1	(Hungary) (Belgium)	József Asbóth; Jacques Brichant	2; 6	3; 6	6; 4	8; 10
2	(Hungary) (Belgium)	Antal Jancsó; Philippe Washer	2; 6	6; 3	1; 6	1; 6
3	(Hungary) (Belgium)	Zoltán Katona / Dezső Vad; Jacques Brichant / Philippe Washer	2; 6	2; 6	4; 6
4	(Hungary) (Belgium)	József Asbóth; Philippe Washer	6; 4	9; 11	4; 6	3; 6
5	(Hungary) (Belgium)	Antal Jancsó; Jacques Brichant	4; 6	2; 6	2; 6

== Quarterfinals ==
=== France vs. West Germany ===
France
4
Stade Roland Garros, Paris, France
12–14 June 1953
Clay

West Germany
1

			1	2	3	4	5
1	(France) (West Germany)	Paul Rémy; Gottfried von Cramm	4; 6	0; 6	4; 6
2	(France) (West Germany)	Robert Haillet; Engelbert Koch	6; 1	6; 3	6; 1
3	(France) (West Germany)	Jean Ducos de la Haille / Paul Rémy; Gottfried von Cramm / Rolf Göpfert	2; 6	6; 4	3; 6	6; 2	6; 4
4	(France) (West Germany)	Robert Haillet; Gottfried von Cramm	1; 6	2; 6	6; 1	7; 5	6; 4
5	(France) (West Germany)	Paul Rémy; Engelbert Koch	6; 2	6; 4	6; 2

=== Denmark vs. Philippines ===
Denmark
4
Copenhagen, Denmark
10–12 June 1953
Clay

Philippines
1

			1	2	3	4	5
1	(Denmark) (Philippines)	Torben Ulrich; Raymundo Deyro	6; 3	6; 2	6; 4
2	(Denmark) (Philippines)	Kurt Nielsen; Felicisimo Ampon	8; 6	6; 3	8; 6
3	(Denmark) (Philippines)	Kurt Nielsen / Torben Ulrich; Felicisimo Ampon / Raymundo Deyro	6; 3	6; 8	6; 3	8; 6
4	(Denmark) (Philippines)	Torben Ulrich; Felicisimo Ampon	4; 6	2; 6	3; 6
5	(Denmark) (Philippines)	Kurt Nielsen; Raymundo Deyro	6; 2	6; 3	6; 4

=== Italy vs. Sweden ===
Italy
4
Turin, Italy
12–14 June 1953
Clay

Sweden
1

			1	2	3	4	5
1	(Italy) (Sweden)	Fausto Gardini; Lennart Bergelin	7; 9	1; 6	6; 2	7; 5	6; 3
2	(Italy) (Sweden)	Giuseppe Merlo; Sven Davidson	4; 6	6; 3	6; 3	7; 5
3	(Italy) (Sweden)	Marcello del Bello / Giovanni Cucelli; Lennart Bergelin / Sven Davidson	6; 2	1; 6	6; 2	6; 3
4	(Italy) (Sweden)	Orlando Sirola; Sven Davidson	3; 6	6; 3	7; 5	3; 6	4; 6
5	(Italy) (Sweden)	Giuseppe Merlo; Staffan Stockenberg	6; 4	6; 0	6; 2

=== Belgium vs. Great Britain ===
Belgium
4
Brussels, Belgium
12–14 June 1953
Clay

Great Britain
1

			1	2	3	4	5
1	(Belgium) (United Kingdom)	Philippe Washer; Tony Mottram	7; 5	6; 4	7; 5
2	(Belgium) (United Kingdom)	Jacques Brichant; Geoffrey Paish	6; 4	4; 6	6; 2	6; 1
3	(Belgium) (United Kingdom)	Jacques Brichant / Philippe Washer; Tony Mottram / Geoffrey Paish	8; 6	1; 6	2; 6	4; 6
4	(Belgium) (United Kingdom)	Jacques Brichant; Tony Mottram	7; 5	6; 4	6; 0
5	(Belgium) (United Kingdom)	Philippe Washer; Geoffrey Paish	6; 2	6; 2	6; 2

== Semifinals ==
=== France vs. Denmark ===
France
1
Stade Roland Garros, Paris, France
10–13 July 1953
Clay

Denmark
4

			1	2	3	4	5
1	(France) (Denmark)	Robert Haillet; Kurt Nielsen	6; 3	2; 6	4; 6	2; 6
2	(France) (Denmark)	Paul Rémy; Torben Ulrich	2; 6	6; 1	6; 1	6; 2
3	(France) (Denmark)	Jean Ducos de la Haille / Paul Rémy; Kurt Nielsen / Torben Ulrich	6; 0	3; 6	6; 3	3; 6	6; 8
4	(France) (Denmark)	Robert Haillet; Torben Ulrich	4; 6	2; 6	7; 5	4; 6
5	(France) (Denmark)	Paul Rémy; Kurt Nielsen	10; 12	6; 1	6; 0	0; 6	4; 6

=== Belgium vs. Italy ===
Belgium
3
Brussels, Belgium
10–13 July 1953

Italy
2

			1	2	3	4	5
1	(Belgium) (Italy)	Philippe Washer; Fausto Gardini	6; 4	14; 16	2; 6	6; 4	6; 3
2	(Belgium) (Italy)	Jacques Brichant; Giuseppe Merlo	6; 4	1; 6	6; 4	4; 6	8; 10
3	(Belgium) (Italy)	Jacques Brichant / Philippe Washer; Marcello del Bello / Giovanni Cucelli	3; 6	6; 2	5; 7	1; 6
4	(Belgium) (Italy)	Philippe Washer; Giuseppe Merlo	6; 2	6; 2	6; 4
5	(Belgium) (Italy)	Jacques Brichant; Fausto Gardini	6; 2	7; 5	4; 6	9; 7

== Final ==
=== Denmark vs. Belgium ===
Denmark
2
Copenhagen, Denmark
18–20 July 1953
Clay

Belgium
3

			1	2	3	4	5
1	(Denmark) (Belgium)	Kurt Nielsen; Jacques Brichant	6; 1	7; 5	3; 6	3; 6	6; 3
2	(Denmark) (Belgium)	Torben Ulrich; Philippe Washer	6; 4	4; 6	5; 7	1; 6
3	(Denmark) (Belgium)	Kurt Nielsen / Torben Ulrich; Jacques Brichant / Philippe Washer	6; 4	6; 3	7; 9	1; 6	4; 6
4	(Denmark) (Belgium)	Torben Ulrich; Jacques Brichant	5; 7	7; 5	3; 6	3; 6
5	(Denmark) (Belgium)	Kurt Nielsen; Philippe Washer	8; 6	6; 8	6; 2	6; 4
