= 1964 Davis Cup America Zone =

Subzone of Davis Cup

The America Zone was one of the three regional zones of the 1964 Davis Cup.

7 teams entered the America Zone, with the winner going on to compete in the Inter-Zonal Zone against the winners of the Eastern Zone and Europe Zone. Australia defeated Chile in the final and progressed to the Inter-Zonal Zone.

== Draw ==
Quarterfinals; 17–20 July
Chile
bye
Venezuela
Caribbean/West Indies	w/o
Mexico City, Mexico (clay)
Mexico	3
New Zealand	1
Montreal, Canada (clay)
Canada	0
Australia	5

Semifinals; 29–31 May; 1–3 August
Bridgetown, Barbados
Chile	3
Caribbean/West Indies	2
Mexico City, Mexico (clay)
Mexico	1
Australia	4

Final; 14–16 August
Minneapolis, MN, United States (hard)
Chile	0
Australia	5

== Quarterfinals ==
=== Mexico vs. New Zealand ===
Mexico
3
Centro Deportivo Chapultepec, Mexico City, Mexico
18–20 July 1964
Clay

New Zealand
1

			1	2	3	4	5
1	(Mexico) (New Zealand)	Antonio Palafox; Lew Gerrard	6; 2	8; 6	6; 4
2	(Mexico) (New Zealand)	Rafael Osuna; Ian Crookenden	6; 2	10; 8	5; 7	6; 4
3	(Mexico) (New Zealand)	Rafael Osuna / Antonio Palafox; Ian Crookenden / Lew Gerrard	7; 5	7; 5	4; 6	6; 4
4	(Mexico) (New Zealand)	Vicente Zarazúa; Ian Crookenden	4; 6	4; 6	6; 3	6; 8
5	(Mexico) (New Zealand)	Joaquín Loyo Mayo; Lew Gerrard	6; 4	6; 4	4; 6	3; 6		not completed

=== Canada vs. Australia ===
Canada
0
Mount Royal Tennis Club, Montreal, Canada
17–19 July 1964
Clay

Australia
5

			1	2	3	4	5
1	(Canada) (Australia)	Keith Carpenter; Roy Emerson	2; 6	1; 6	2; 6
2	(Canada) (Australia)	François Godbout; John Newcombe	3; 6	3; 6	6; 4	5; 7
3	(Canada) (Australia)	Keith Carpenter / François Godbout; Roy Emerson / Tony Roche	2; 6	2; 6	2; 6
4	(Canada) (Australia)	François Godbout; Tony Roche	2; 6	1; 6	1; 6
5	(Canada) (Australia)	Reider Getz; John Newcombe	3; 6	0; 6	4; 6

== Semifinals ==
=== Caribbean/West Indies vs. Chile ===
Caribbean/West Indies
2
Bridgetown, Barbados
29–31 May 1964

Chile
3

			1	2	3	4	5
1	(Cricket West Indies) (Chile)	David Tate; Patricio Rodríguez	4; 6	2; 6	5; 7
2	(Cricket West Indies) (Chile)	Richard Russell; Ernesto Aguirre	7; 5	6; 4	3; 6	9; 7
3	(Cricket West Indies) (Chile)	Alan Price / Richard Russell; Ernesto Aguirre / Patricio Rodríguez	2; 6	6; 4	7; 5	6; 4
4	(Cricket West Indies) (Chile)	Richard Russell; Patricio Rodríguez	2; 6	6; 1	5; 7	1; 6
5	(Cricket West Indies) (Chile)	David Tate; Ernesto Aguirre	3; 6	11; 9	6; 1	2; 6	4; 6

=== Mexico vs. Australia ===
Mexico
1
Centro Deportivo Chapultepec, Mexico City, Mexico
1–3 August 1964
Clay

Australia
4

			1	2	3	4	5
1	(Mexico) (Australia)	Rafael Osuna; Fred Stolle	6; 2	7; 5	6; 4
2	(Mexico) (Australia)	Antonio Palafox; Roy Emerson	6; 8	3; 6	3; 6
3	(Mexico) (Australia)	Rafael Osuna / Antonio Palafox; Roy Emerson / Fred Stolle	16; 18	9; 7	9; 7	4; 6	8; 10
4	(Mexico) (Australia)	Antonio Palafox; Fred Stolle	3; 6	2; 6	4; 6
5	(Mexico) (Australia)	Rafael Osuna; Roy Emerson	3; 6	4; 6	9; 11

== Final ==
=== Australia vs. Chile ===
Australia
5
Nicollet Tennis Club, Minneapolis, MN, United States
14–16 August 1964
Hard

Chile
0

			1	2	3	4	5
1	(Australia) (Chile)	Fred Stolle; Patricio Cornejo	6; 1	6; 0	6; 0
2	(Australia) (Chile)	Roy Emerson; Patricio Rodríguez	6; 3	6; 2	8; 6
3	(Australia) (Chile)	Roy Emerson / Fred Stolle; Ernesto Aguirre / Patricio Rodríguez	6; 4	6; 4	6; 4
4	(Australia) (Chile)	John Newcombe; Ernesto Aguirre	6; 2	6; 2	6; 4
5	(Australia) (Chile)	Fred Stolle; Patricio Rodríguez	6; 0	6; 4	6; 4
