= 1950 Davis Cup Europe Zone =

International tennis competition

Details
- Duration: 7 April 1950 – 30 July 1950
- Teams: 22
- Categories: 1950 Davis Cup Europe Zone; 1950 Davis Cup America Zone

Champion
- Winning nation: Italy; Qualified for: 1950 Davis Cup; Inter-Zonal Final

The Europe Zone was one of the two regional zones of the 1950 Davis Cup.

22 teams entered the Europe Zone, with the winner going on to compete in the Inter-Zonal Final against the winner of the America Zone. Sweden defeated Denmark in the final, and went on to face Australia in the Inter-Zonal Final.

== Draw ==
First Round; 7 April–9 May
Poland
bye
Israel
bye
Ireland
bye
Monaco
bye
Peru
bye
Philippines	5
Pakistan	0
Norway	w/o
Hungary
Netherlands	1
Sweden	4
Belgium	4
Finland	1
Yugoslavia	5
Austria	0
Great Britain	2
Italy	3
bye
Luxembourg
bye
Denmark
bye
Egypt
bye
France
bye
Switzerland

Second Round; 18–22 May
Warsaw, Poland
Poland	5
Israel	0
Dublin, Ireland (grass)
Ireland	5
Monaco	0
Peru
Philippines	w/o
Oslo, Norway (clay)
Norway	0
Sweden	5
Zagreb, Yugoslavia
Belgium	3
Yugoslavia	2
Mondorf-les-Bains, Luxembourg
Italy	5
Luxembourg	0
Copenhagen, Denmark (clay)
Denmark	3
Egypt	0
Paris, France (clay)
France	4
Switzerland	0

Quarterfinals; 8–18 June
Warsaw, Poland
Poland	3
Ireland	2
Solna, Sweden (clay)
Philippines	0
Sweden	5
Brussels, Belgium
Belgium	2
Italy	3
Copenhagen, Denmark (clay)
Denmark	3
France	2

Semifinals; 13–16 July
Båstad, Sweden (clay)
Poland	0
Sweden	5
Copenhagen, Denmark (clay)
Italy	1
Denmark	4

Final; 28–30 July
Båstad, Sweden (clay)
Sweden	4
Denmark	0

== First round ==
=== Philippines vs. Pakistan ===
Philippines
5
Manila, Philippines
7–9 April 1950

Pakistan
0

			1	2	3	4	5
1	(Philippines) (Pakistan)	Raymundo Deyro; Khan-Iftikhar Ahmed	6; 2	6; 0	6; 3
2	(Philippines) (Pakistan)	Felicisimo Ampon; Mahmoud Alam	6; 0	6; 1	6; 0
3	(Philippines) (Pakistan)	Felicisimo Ampon / César Carmona; Khan-Iftikhar Ahmed / Mahmoud Alam	6; 3	6; 1	6; 1
4	(Philippines) (Pakistan)	Raymundo Deyro; Mahmoud Alam	6; 0	6; 2	6; 0
5	(Philippines) (Pakistan)	Felicisimo Ampon; Khan-Iftikhar Ahmed	6; 0	6; 4	6; 0

=== Netherlands vs. Sweden ===
Netherlands
1
Mets Banen, Scheveningen, Netherlands
5–7 May 1950
Clay

Sweden
4

			1	2	3	4	5
1	(Netherlands) (Sweden)	John Linck; Lennart Bergelin	3; 6	2; 6	1; 6
2	(Netherlands) (Sweden)	Boebi van Meegeren; Torsten Johansson	1; 6	2; 6	4; 6
3	(Netherlands) (Sweden)	Ivo Rinkel / Hans van Swol; Lennart Bergelin / Torsten Johansson	6; 3	5; 7	2; 6	8; 6	6; 1
4	(Netherlands) (Sweden)	Boebi van Meegeren; Lennart Bergelin	1; 6	2; 6	2; 6
5	(Netherlands) (Sweden)	John Linck; Torsten Johansson	2; 6	2; 6	4; 6

=== Belgium vs. Finland ===
Belgium
4
Brussels, Belgium
5–7 May 1950

Finland
1

			1	2	3	4	5
1	(Belgium) (Finland)	Philippe Washer; Pentti Forsman	6; 2	6; 0	6; 2
2	(Belgium) (Finland)	Jacques Brichant; Sakari Salo	6; 4	8; 6	6; 4
3	(Belgium) (Finland)	Jacques Brichant / Philippe Washer; Pentti Forsman / Sakari Salo	6; 4	6; 2	6; 3
4	(Belgium) (Finland)	Jacques Peten; Sakari Salo	1; 6	1; 6	6; 4	6; 2	3; 6
5	(Belgium) (Finland)	Jacques Brichant; Pentti Forsman	8; 6	6; 2	7; 5

=== Yugoslavia vs. Austria ===
Yugoslavia
5
Zagreb, Yugoslavia
5–7 May 1950

Austria
0

			1	2	3	4	5
1	(Socialist Federal Republic of Yugoslavia) (Austria)	Josip Palada; Hans Redl	6; 3	6; 2	6; 2
2	(Socialist Federal Republic of Yugoslavia) (Austria)	Milan Branović; Alfred Huber	6; 2	6; 1	6; 4
3	(Socialist Federal Republic of Yugoslavia) (Austria)	Petko Milojković / Josip Palada; Alfred Huber / Hans Redl	7; 5	6; 1	7; 5
4	(Socialist Federal Republic of Yugoslavia) (Austria)	Josip Palada; Alfred Huber	7; 5	6; 4	6; 4
5	(Socialist Federal Republic of Yugoslavia) (Austria)	Milan Branović; Hans Redl	8; 6	6; 1	6; 2

=== Great Britain vs. Italy ===
Great Britain
2
Devonshire Park Lawn Tennis Club, Eastbourne, England
6–9 May 1950
Grass

Italy
3

			1	2	3	4	5
1	(United Kingdom) (Italy)	Tony Mottram; Giovanni Cucelli	7; 5	3; 6	5; 7	4; 6
2	(United Kingdom) (Italy)	Geoffrey Paish; Marcello del Bello	6; 4	4; 6	6; 3	4; 6	6; 3
3	(United Kingdom) (Italy)	Tony Mottram / Geoffrey Paish; Marcello del Bello / Giovanni Cucelli	7; 9	2; 6	4; 6
4	(United Kingdom) (Italy)	Tony Mottram; Marcello del Bello	6; 3	6; 3	8; 6
5	(United Kingdom) (Italy)	Geoffrey Paish; Giovanni Cucelli	6; 1	2; 6	4; 6	6; 8

== Second round ==
=== Poland vs. Israel ===
Poland
5
Warsaw, Poland
19–21 May 1950

Israel
0

			1	2	3	4	5
1	(Poland) (Israel)	Władysław Skonecki; Arie Avidan-Weiss	6; 3	6; 2	6; 4
2	(Poland) (Israel)	Józef Piątek; Jacob Buntmann	4; 6	6; 0	8; 6	6; 1
3	(Poland) (Israel)	Józef Piątek / Władysław Skonecki; Arie Avidan-Weiss / Yehuda Finkelkraut	7; 5	6; 3	6; 4
4	(Poland) (Israel)	Władysław Skonecki; Jacob Buntmann	6; 2	6; 0	6; 2
5	(Poland) (Israel)	Józef Piątek; Arie Avidan-Weiss	6; 1	6; 0	4; 6	4; 6	6; 2

=== Ireland vs. Monaco ===
Ireland
5
Fitzwilliam Lawn Tennis Club, Dublin, Ireland
18–20 May 1950
Grass

Monaco
0

			1	2	3	4	5
1	(Republic of Ireland) (Monaco)	Cyril Kemp; Georges Pasquier	6; 3	6; 2	6; 2
2	(Republic of Ireland) (Monaco)	Matthew Murphy; Aleco Noghès	6; 3	2; 6	6; 3	6; 2
3	(Republic of Ireland) (Monaco)	Joseph Hackett / Matthew Murphy; Aleco Noghès / Georges Pasquier	6; 3	7; 5	7; 5
4	(Republic of Ireland) (Monaco)	Matthew Murphy; Georges Pasquier	6; 0	7; 5	4; 6	6; 1
5	(Republic of Ireland) (Monaco)	Joseph Hackett; Aleco Noghès	8; 6	11; 9	6; 3

=== Norway vs. Sweden ===
Norway
0
Oslo Tennis Club, Oslo, Norway
19–21 May 1950
Clay

Sweden
5

			1	2	3	4	5
1	(Norway) (Sweden)	Thorgny Haanes; Lennart Bergelin	1; 6	2; 6	3; 6
2	(Norway) (Sweden)	Nils-Erik Hessen; Torsten Johansson	5; 7	2; 6	6; 3	6; 8
3	(Norway) (Sweden)	Thorgny Haanes / Nils-Erik Hessen; Lennart Bergelin / Sven Davidson	1; 6	1; 6	2; 6
4	(Norway) (Sweden)	Thorgny Haanes; Torsten Johansson	2; 6	3; 6	6; 8
5	(Norway) (Sweden)	Nils-Erik Hessen; Sven Davidson	3; 6	3; 6	4; 6

=== Yugoslavia vs. Belgium ===
Yugoslavia
2
Zagreb, Yugoslavia
19–21 May 1950

Belgium
3

			1	2	3	4	5
1	(Socialist Federal Republic of Yugoslavia) (Belgium)	Dragutin Mitić; Philippe Washer	6; 3	6; 4	4; 6	6; 3
2	(Socialist Federal Republic of Yugoslavia) (Belgium)	Milan Branović; Jacques Brichant	4; 6	2; 6	4; 6
3	(Socialist Federal Republic of Yugoslavia) (Belgium)	Dragutin Mitić / Josip Palada; Jacques Brichant / Philippe Washer	4; 6	4; 6	7; 5	6; 3	4; 6
4	(Socialist Federal Republic of Yugoslavia) (Belgium)	Dragutin Mitić; Jacques Brichant	7; 5	6; 1	6; 3
5	(Socialist Federal Republic of Yugoslavia) (Belgium)	Milan Branović; Philippe Washer	4; 6	1; 6	1; 6

=== Luxembourg vs. Italy ===
Luxembourg
0
Mondorf-les-Bains, Luxembourg
20–22 May 1950

Italy
5

			1	2	3	4	5
1	(Luxembourg) (Italy)	Gaston Wampach; Giovanni Cucelli	2; 6	2; 6	1; 6
2	(Luxembourg) (Italy)	Géza Wertheim; Rolando del Bello	1; 6	2; 6	2; 6
3	(Luxembourg) (Italy)	Gaston Wampach / Géza Wertheim; Marcello del Bello / Giovanni Cucelli	0; 6	2; 6	1; 6
4	(Luxembourg) (Italy)	Géza Wertheim; Marcello del Bello	3; 6	0; 6	2; 6
5	(Luxembourg) (Italy)	Gaston Wampach; Rolando del Bello	1; 6	5; 7	4; 6

=== Denmark vs. Egypt ===
Denmark
3
Copenhagen, Denmark
19–21 May 1950
Clay

Egypt
0

			1	2	3	4	5
1	(Denmark) (Egypt)	Torben Ulrich; Marcel Coen	6; 1	6; 0	6; 0
2	(Denmark) (Egypt)	Kurt Nielsen; Adli El Shafei	6; 4	3; 6	8; 6	6; 1
3	(Denmark) (Egypt)	Kurt Nielsen / Torben Ulrich; Marcel Coen / Adli El Shafei	2; 6	9; 7	6; 4	6; 3
4	(Denmark) (Egypt)	Kurt Nielsen; Marcel Coen						not played
5	(Denmark) (Egypt)	Torben Ulrich; Adli El Shafei						not played

=== France vs. Switzerland ===
France
4
Stade Roland Garros, Paris, France
19–21 May 1950
Clay

Switzerland
0

			1	2	3	4	5
1	(France) (Switzerland)	Jacques Thomas; Georges Grange	6; 0	6; 1	7; 5
2	(France) (Switzerland)	Bernard Destremau; Max Albrecht	6; 1	6; 2	6; 1
3	(France) (Switzerland)	Robert Abdesselam / Paul Rémy; Jean-Pierre Blondel / René Buser	6; 3	6; 4	8; 6
4	(France) (Switzerland)	Bernard Destremau; Georges Grange	6; 2	6; 3	8; 6
5	(France) (Switzerland)	Jacques Thomas; Max Albrecht	7; 5	6; 4	1; 6	0; 1		not completed

== Quarterfinals ==
=== Poland vs. Ireland ===
Poland
3
Warsaw, Poland
8–10 June 1950

Ireland
2

			1	2	3	4	5
1	(Poland) (Republic of Ireland)	Władysław Skonecki; Matthew Murphy	9; 7	6; 3	6; 2
2	(Poland) (Republic of Ireland)	Józef Piątek; Cyril Kemp	6; 1	6; 1	9; 7
3	(Poland) (Republic of Ireland)	Jan Chytrowski / Władysław Skonecki; Joseph Hackett / Matthew Murphy	8; 10	10; 8	14; 12	5; 7	1; 6
4	(Poland) (Republic of Ireland)	Józef Piątek; Matthew Murphy	6; 0	2; 6	3; 6	2; 6
5	(Poland) (Republic of Ireland)	Władysław Skonecki; Cyril Kemp	6; 3	6; 2	6; 0

=== Sweden vs. Philippines ===
Sweden
5
Solna Tennisstadion, Solna, Sweden
16–18 June 1950
Clay

Philippines
0

			1	2	3	4	5
1	(Sweden) (Philippines)	Lennart Bergelin; Felicisimo Ampon	6; 4	4; 6	6; 1	6; 2
2	(Sweden) (Philippines)	Torsten Johansson; Raymundo Deyro	6; 2	3; 6	6; 2	6; 3
3	(Sweden) (Philippines)	Lennart Bergelin / Sven Davidson; Felicisimo Ampon / César Carmona	6; 2	6; 3	6; 3
4	(Sweden) (Philippines)	Sven Davidson; Raymundo Deyro	6; 1	6; 0	6; 1
5	(Sweden) (Philippines)	Torsten Johansson; Felicisimo Ampon	6; 8	8; 10	6; 4	6; 1	6; 1

=== Belgium vs. Italy ===
Belgium
2
Brussels, Belgium
16–18 June 1950

Italy
3

			1	2	3	4	5
1	(Belgium) (Italy)	Philippe Washer; Giovanni Cucelli	6; 2	11; 9	6; 4
2	(Belgium) (Italy)	Jacques Brichant; Rolando del Bello	4; 6	1; 6	3; 6
3	(Belgium) (Italy)	Jacques Brichant / Philippe Washer; Rolando del Bello / Giovanni Cucelli	6; 4	2; 6	2; 6	6; 8
4	(Belgium) (Italy)	Philippe Washer; Rolando del Bello	6; 4	6; 1	6; 1
5	(Belgium) (Italy)	Jacques Brichant; Giovanni Cucelli	2; 6	7; 5	4; 6	2; 6

=== Denmark vs. France ===
Denmark
3
Copenhagen, Denmark
16–18 June 1950
Clay

France
2

			1	2	3	4	5
1	(Denmark) (France)	Kurt Nielsen; Marcel Bernard	6; 3	4; 6	6; 1	6; 2
2	(Denmark) (France)	Torben Ulrich; Bernard Destremau	9; 7	4; 6	0; 6	4; 6
3	(Denmark) (France)	Kurt Nielsen / Torben Ulrich; Paul Rémy / Jacques Thomas	7; 5	6; 4	12; 10
4	(Denmark) (France)	Kurt Nielsen; Bernard Destremau	6; 2	3; 6	6; 4	6; 3
5	(Denmark) (France)	Torben Ulrich; Marcel Bernard	3; 6	4; 6	0; 6

== Semifinals ==
=== Sweden vs. Poland ===
Sweden
5
Båstad Tennis Stadium, Båstad, Sweden
13–15 July 1950
Clay

Poland
0

			1	2	3	4	5
1	(Sweden) (Poland)	Torsten Johansson; Józef Piątek	6; 1	6; 1	6; 3
2	(Sweden) (Poland)	Lennart Bergelin; Władysław Skonecki	6; 2	6; 2	1; 6	6; 1
3	(Sweden) (Poland)	Sven Davidson / Torsten Johansson; Józef Piątek / Władysław Skonecki	6; 4	6; 0	7; 5
4	(Sweden) (Poland)	Torsten Johansson; Władysław Skonecki	6; 3	6; 3	6; 3
5	(Sweden) (Poland)	Sven Davidson; Józef Piątek	6; 0	6; 2	6; 2

=== Denmark vs. Italy ===
Denmark
4
Copenhagen, Denmark
14–16 July 1950
Clay

Italy
1

			1	2	3	4	5
1	(Denmark) (Italy)	Torben Ulrich; Rolando del Bello	6; 0	6; 2	6; 2
2	(Denmark) (Italy)	Kurt Nielsen; Giovanni Cucelli	6; 3	7; 5	0; 6	0; 6	6; 4
3	(Denmark) (Italy)	Kurt Nielsen / Torben Ulrich; Marcello del Bello / Giovanni Cucelli	2; 6	4; 6	2; 6
4	(Denmark) (Italy)	Kurt Nielsen; Rolando del Bello	6; 3	7; 5	6; 4
5	(Denmark) (Italy)	Torben Ulrich; Giovanni Cucelli	3; 6	6; 2	6; 2	6; 3

== Final ==
=== Sweden vs. Denmark ===
Sweden
4
Båstad Tennis Stadium, Båstad, Sweden
28–30 July 1950
Clay

Denmark
0

			1	2	3	4	5
1	(Sweden) (Denmark)	Torsten Johansson; Torben Ulrich	6; 1	4; 6	6; 3	6; 1
2	(Sweden) (Denmark)	Sven Davidson; Kurt Nielsen	7; 5	3; 6	6; 2	6; 4
3	(Sweden) (Denmark)	Lennart Bergelin / Sven Davidson; Kurt Nielsen / Torben Ulrich	6; 2	6; 2	6; 2
4	(Sweden) (Denmark)	Torsten Johansson; Kurt Nielsen	3; 6	7; 5	6; 0	4; 6	6; 2
5	(Sweden) (Denmark)	Lennart Bergelin; Torben Ulrich	6; 0	6; 2				not completed
