= 1964 Davis Cup Eastern Zone =

International tennis competition

The Eastern Zone was one of the three regional zones of the 1964 Davis Cup.

10 teams entered the Eastern Zone, with the winner going on to compete in the Inter-Zonal Zone against the winners of the America Zone and Europe Zone. With the increase in entries, the Eastern Zone was split into two sub-zones, with the winner of each sub-zone playing to determine which team moved to the Inter-Zonal Zone.

The Philippines defeated Japan in the Zone A final, and India defeated South Vietnam in the Zone B final. In the Inter-Zonal final the Philippines defeated India and progressed to the Inter-Zonal Zone.

== Zone A ==
=== Draw ===
Semifinals; 3–5 April
Manila, Philippines
Philippines	4
South Korea	1
bye
Japan

Final; 10–12 April
Manila, Philippines
Philippines	5
Japan	0

=== Semifinals ===
==== Philippines vs. South Korea ====
Philippines
4
Manila, Philippines
3–5 April 1964

South Korea
1

			1	2	3	4	5
1	(Philippines) (South Korea)	Felicisimo Ampon; Im Chung-yang	6; 1	6; 2	6; 0
2	(Philippines) (South Korea)	Juan-Johnson José; Kim Doo-hwan	6; 0	6; 4	6; 3
3	(Philippines) (South Korea)	Samuel Ang / Daniel José; Im Chung-yang / Kim Doo-hwan	6; 4	6; 1	7; 5
4	(Philippines) (South Korea)	Samuel Ang; Kim Doo-hwan	6; 4	6; 1	6; 4
5	(Philippines) (South Korea)	Daniel José; Im Chung-yang	6; 2	4; 6	3; 6	6; 2	3; 6

=== Final ===
==== Philippines vs. Japan ====
Philippines
5
Manila, Philippines
10–12 April 1964

Japan
0

			1	2	3	4	5
1	(Philippines) (Japan)	Felicisimo Ampon; Osamu Ishiguro	2; 6	6; 0	6; 2	6; 4
2	(Philippines) (Japan)	Juan-Johnson José; Koji Watanabe	6; 3	5; 7	6; 3	6; 3
3	(Philippines) (Japan)	Raymundo Deyro / Juan-Johnson José; Osamu Ishiguro / Koji Watanabe	7; 5	6; 2	6; 3
4	(Philippines) (Japan)	Felicisimo Ampon; Koji Watanabe	6; 2	6; 4	3; 6	4; 6	6; 0
5	(Philippines) (Japan)	Raymundo Deyro; Osamu Ishiguro	6; 1	6; 1	6; 4

== Zone B ==
=== Draw ===
Quarterfinals; 29 February–2 March
Pakistan
bye
Hyderabad, India
India	5
Ceylon	0
Kuala Lumpur, Malaysia
Malaysia	0
South Vietnam	5
Burma
Iran	w/o

Semifinals; 13–15 March; 3–5 April
Lahore, Pakistan
Pakistan	0
India	4
Tehran, Iran
South Vietnam	3
Iran	2

Final; 17–19 April
Saigon, South Vietnam
India	5
South Vietnam	0

=== Quarterfinals ===
==== India vs. Ceylon ====
India
5
Hyderabad, India
29 February–2 March 1964

Ceylon
0

			1	2	3	4	5
1	(India) (Dominion of Ceylon)	Jaidip Mukerjea; Lassantha Fernando	6; 2	6; 2	6; 2
2	(India) (Dominion of Ceylon)	Premjit Lall; Bernard Pinto	6; 1	6; 3	6; 3
3	(India) (Dominion of Ceylon)	Premjit Lall / Shiv Prakash Misra; Lassantha Fernando / Bernard Pinto	6; 4	3; 6	6; 4	6; 3
4	(India) (Dominion of Ceylon)	Premjit Lall; Lassantha Fernando	6; 1	6; 4	6; 3
5	(India) (Dominion of Ceylon)	Shiv Prakash Misra; Bernard Pinto	6; 4	6; 2	6; 4

==== Malaysia vs. South Vietnam ====
Malaysia
0
Kuala Lumpur, Malaysia
29 February–2 March 1964

South Vietnam
5

			1	2	3	4	5
1	(Malaysia) (South Vietnam)	Sultan-Aman Azman; Lưu Hoàng Đức	2; 6	5; 7	6; 4	6; 3	4; 6
2	(Malaysia) (South Vietnam)	Song-Kean Tan; Võ Văn Bảy	4; 6	1; 6	6; 3	3; 6
3	(Malaysia) (South Vietnam)	Sultan-Aman Azman / Sharin Osman; Lưu Hoàng Đức / Võ Văn Bảy	7; 9	6; 8	5; 7
4	(Malaysia) (South Vietnam)	Song-Kean Tan; Lưu Hoàng Đức	2; 6	1; 6	6; 8
5	(Malaysia) (South Vietnam)	Sultan-Aman Azman; Võ Văn Bảy	2; 6	3; 6	2; 6

=== Semifinals ===
==== Pakistan vs. India ====
Pakistan
0
Lahore, Pakistan
13–15 March 1964

India
4

			1	2	3	4	5
1	(Pakistan) (India)	Zulfiqar Rahim; Akhtar Ali	3; 6	4; 6	4; 6
2	(Pakistan) (India)	Munir Pirzada; Premjit Lall	0; 6	2; 6	5; 7
3	(Pakistan) (India)	Azim Inayat / Munir Pirzada; Akhtar Ali / Premjit Lall	4; 6	2; 6	4; 6
4	(Pakistan) (India)	Zulfiqar Rahim; Shiv Prakash Misra	4; 6	6; 3	7; 9	11; 13
5	(Pakistan) (India)	Munawar Iqbal; Akhtar Ali	3; 6	5; 7	3; 3			not completed

==== Iran vs. South Vietnam ====
Iran
3
Tehran, Iran
3–5 April 1964

South Vietnam
2

			1	2	3	4	5
1	(Iran) (South Vietnam)	Taghi Akbari; Võ Văn Bảy	6; 2	6; 1	4; 6	6; 3
2	(Iran) (South Vietnam)	Reza Akbari; Lưu Hoàng Đức	10; 12	4; 6	0; 6
3	(Iran) (South Vietnam)	Reza Akbari / Taghi Akbari; Lưu Hoàng Đức / Võ Văn Bảy	6; 2	4; 6	2; 6	5; 7
4	(Iran) (South Vietnam)	Reza Akbari; Võ Văn Bảy	3; 6	2; 6	1; 6
5	(Iran) (South Vietnam)	Taghi Akbari; Lưu Hoàng Đức	6; 3	7; 5	6; 1

=== Final ===
==== South Vietnam vs. India ====
South Vietnam
0
Saigon, South Vietnam
17–19 April 1964

India
5

			1	2	3	4	5
1	(South Vietnam) (India)	Lưu Hoàng Đức; Premjit Lall	5; 7	4; 6	3; 6
2	(South Vietnam) (India)	Võ Văn Bảy; Jaidip Mukerjea	5; 7	4; 6	6; 4	6; 4	3; 6
3	(South Vietnam) (India)	Lưu Hoàng Đức / Võ Văn Bảy; Premjit Lall / Jaidip Mukerjea	6; 4	4; 6	3; 6	4; 6
4	(South Vietnam) (India)	Lưu Hoàng Đức; Jaidip Mukerjea	3; 6	1; 6	4; 6
5	(South Vietnam) (India)	Võ Văn Bảy; Premjit Lall	4; 6	4; 6	3; 6

== Eastern Inter-Zonal Final ==
=== Philippines vs. India ===
Philippines
3
Manila, Philippines
24–26 April 1964

India
2

			1	2	3	4	5
1	(Philippines) (India)	Juan-Johnson José; Jaidip Mukerjea	5; 7	6; 3	3; 6	2; 6
2	(Philippines) (India)	Felicisimo Ampon; Premjit Lall	6; 0	6; 3	7; 5
3	(Philippines) (India)	Raymundo Deyro / Juan-Johnson José; Premjit Lall / Jaidip Mukerjea	3; 6	6; 1	6; 3	2; 6	7; 9
4	(Philippines) (India)	Felicisimo Ampon; Jaidip Mukerjea	6; 4	6; 1	6; 1
5	(Philippines) (India)	Juan-Johnson José; Premjit Lall	6; 4	8; 6	3; 6	6; 4
