= Tilburg International =

Defunct tennis tournament
- Tour: ILTF World Circuit (1968–69) men (1968–72) women ILTF Independent Circuit (1970–79) men (1973–79) women
- Founded: 1968; 57 years ago
- Abolished: 1979; 46 years ago
- Location: Tilburg, Netherlands
- Venue: TC Tilburg
- Surface: Clay / outdoor

The Tilburg International was a men's and women's open international clay court tennis tournament was founded in 1968. Tournament was first played at the Tennis Club Tilburg, Tilburg, Netherlands. It was played annually till 1979.

== History ==
The tournament was established in 1968 at the Tennis Club Tilburg, Tilburg, Netherlands. the event was usually held in July, but was moved to September towards the end of its run in 1979 when it was discontinued. The tournament was part of the ILTF World Circuit from 1968 to 1969 for men, and till 1972 for women. It was then part of the ILTF Independent Circuit from 1970 to 1979 for men and women from 1973 to 1979.

== Finals ==
Notes: Where a runner up is not shown or the score sections have been blanked.

=== Men's singles ===
(incomplete roll)

Year	Winners	Runners-up	Score
1968	(Czechoslovakia) Jan Kukal	(France) Michel Leclercq	7–5, 6–2.
↓ Open era ↓
1970	(Netherlands) Jan Hajer	(Australia) Martin Mulligan	6–3, 3–6, 6–4.
1971	(West Germany) Christian Kuhnke	(Egypt) Ismail El Shafei	4–6, 6–2, 6–3.
1973	(Japan) Toshiro Sakai	(Hungary) Péter Szőke	6–4, 4–6, 6–3.
1979	(France) Patrick Proisy	(United Kingdom) Mark Cox	6–1, 6–4

=== Women's singles ===
(incomplete roll)

Year	Winners	Runners-up	Score
1968	(Belgium) Christiane Mercelis	(France) Maylis Burel	6–4, 8–6
↓ Open era ↓
1969	(West Germany) Almut Sturm	(Netherlands) Marijke Schaar	7–5, 6–4.
1970	(Netherlands) Marijke Schaar	(Netherlands) Tine Zwaan	6–4, 9–7
