= 1953 Davis Cup America Zone =

Regional zone of the 1953 davis cup

The America Zone was one of the three regional zones of the 1953 Davis Cup.

6 teams entered the America Zone, with the winner going on to compete in the Inter-Zonal Zone against the winners of the Eastern Zone and Europe Zone. The United States defeated Canada in the final and progressed to the Inter-Zonal Zone.

== Draw ==
Quarterfinals; 11–20 July
Vancouver, Canada (grass)
Japan	0
United States	5
Caribbean/West Indies
bye
bye
Cuba
Montreal, Canada (grass)
Mexico	2
Canada	3

Semifinals; 25 July–10 August
Kingston, Jamaica (grass)
United States	5
Caribbean/West Indies	0
Montreal, Canada (grass)
Cuba	2
Canada	3

Final; 14–16 September
Montreal, Canada (grass)
United States	5
Canada	0

== Quarterfinals ==
=== United States vs. Japan ===
United States
5
Vancouver Lawn Tennis Club, Vancouver, Canada
11–13 July 1953
Grass

Japan
0

			1	2	3	4	5
1	(United States) (Japan)	Tony Trabert; Kosei Kamo	4; 6	1; 6	6; 1	6; 2	6; 2
2	(United States) (Japan)	Ham Richardson; Atsushi Miyagi	6; 0	6; 3	8; 6
3	(United States) (Japan)	Tom Brown / Tony Trabert; Kosei Kamo / Atsushi Miyagi	6; 2	6; 2	3; 6	6; 3
4	(United States) (Japan)	Tom Brown; Masanobu Kimura	6; 2	6; 0	6; 1
5	(United States) (Japan)	Ham Richardson; Kosei Kamo	0; 6	6; 2	6; 1	6; 2

=== Canada vs. Mexico ===
Canada
3
Mount Royal Tennis Club, Montreal, Canada
18–20 July 1953
Grass

Mexico
2

			1	2	3	4	5
1	(Canada) (Mexico)	Henri Rochon; Mario Llamas	6; 2	6; 3	6; 4
2	(Canada) (Mexico)	Lorne Main; Francisco Contreras	9; 11	8; 6	6; 3	8; 6
3	(Canada) (Mexico)	Robert Bédard / Henri Rochon; Francisco Contreras / Mario Llamas	2; 6	4; 6	6; 2	2; 6
4	(Canada) (Mexico)	Lorne Main; Mario Llamas	6; 2	6; 3	6; 3
5	(Canada) (Mexico)	Henri Rochon; Francisco Contreras	4; 6	4; 6	5; 7

== Semifinals ==
=== Caribbean/West Indies vs. United States ===
Caribbean/West Indies
0
St. Andrew Club, Kingston, Jamaica
25–27 July 1953
Grass

United States
5

			1	2	3	4	5
1	(Cricket West Indies) (United States)	Ronald Cooper; Tut Bartzen	1; 6	2; 6	2; 6
2	(Cricket West Indies) (United States)	Ian McDonald; Gardnar Mulloy	1; 6	3; 6	0; 6
3	(Cricket West Indies) (United States)	Edward Aris / Ian McDonald; Gardnar Mulloy / Bob Perry	2; 6	2; 6	3; 6
4	(Cricket West Indies) (United States)	Ian McDonald; Tut Bartzen	3; 6	1; 6	3; 6
5	(Cricket West Indies) (United States)	Ronald Cooper; Bob Perry	2; 6	2; 6	3; 6

=== Canada vs. Cuba ===
Canada
3
Mount Royal Tennis Club, Montreal, Canada
8–10 August 1953
Grass

Cuba
2

			1	2	3	4	5
1	(Canada) (Cuba)	Henri Rochon; Reynaldo Garrido	6; 2	6; 1	6; 4
2	(Canada) (Cuba)	Lorne Main; Orlando Garrido	6; 2	5; 7	6; 3	6; 2
3	(Canada) (Cuba)	Lorne Main / Paul Willey; Orlando Garrido / Reynaldo Garrido	6; 3	6; 4	6; 2
4	(Canada) (Cuba)	Paul Willey; Reynaldo Garrido	3; 6	4; 6	6; 3	9; 11
5	(Canada) (Cuba)	Robert Bédard; Orlando Garrido	7; 9	6; 2	3; 6	2; 6

== Final ==
=== Canada vs. United States ===
Canada
0
Mount Royal Tennis Club, Montreal, Canada
14–16 September 1953
Grass

United States
5

			1	2	3	4	5
1	(Canada) (United States)	Henri Rochon; Tony Trabert	2; 6	3; 6	6; 8
2	(Canada) (United States)	Lorne Main; Vic Seixas	1; 6	1; 6	4; 6
3	(Canada) (United States)	Lorne Main / Paul Willey; Vic Seixas / Tony Trabert	6; 3	2; 6	3; 6	2; 6
4	(Canada) (United States)	Paul Willey; Straight Clark	5; 7	2; 6	0; 6
5	(Canada) (United States)	Robert Bédard; Tut Bartzen	4; 6	5; 7	6; 1	0; 6
