= Pasi Virtanen =

Finnish tennis coach and former professional player

- Country (sports): Finland
- Born: 24 November 1964 (age 60); Hyvinkää, Finland
- Height: 6 ft 2 in (188 cm)
- Prize money: $12,433

Singles
- Highest ranking: No. 302 (17 Jun 1985)

Doubles
- Highest ranking: No. 259 (23 Dec 1985)

Pasi Virtanen (born 24 November 1964) is a Finnish tennis coach and former professional player.

Virtanen turned professional in 1985, the same year he was Finland's national outdoor singles champion. He competed as high up as the ATP Challenger Tour and from 1991 to 1993 played for the Finland Davis Cup team.

Since the 1990s he has worked as a tennis coach and was based in Estonia for several years. He is a former coach of Estonia's Jürgen Zopp. His four children all play tennis, including professional player Otto Virtanen, who he coaches.

== ATP Challenger finals ==
=== Doubles: 1 (0–1) ===
| Result | No. | Date | Tournament | Surface | Partner | Opponents | Score |
|---|---|---|---|---|---|---|---|
| Loss | 1. | Nov 1987 | Helsinki, Finland | Carpet | (Sweden) Nicklas Utgren | (United States) Peter Palandjian (United States) Bud Schultz | 6–7, 4–6 |

== See also ==
- List of Finland Davis Cup team representatives
