= List of Finland Davis Cup team representatives =

This is a list of tennis players who have represented the Finland Davis Cup team in an official Davis Cup match. Finland have taken part in the competition since 1928.

== Players ==
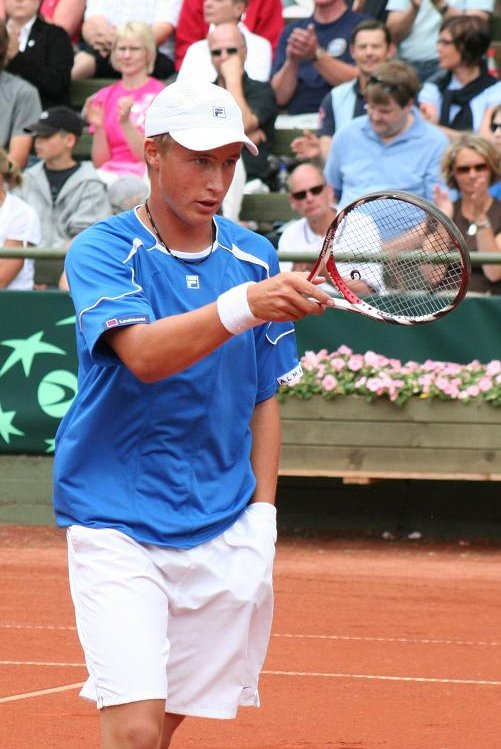
Henri Kontinen

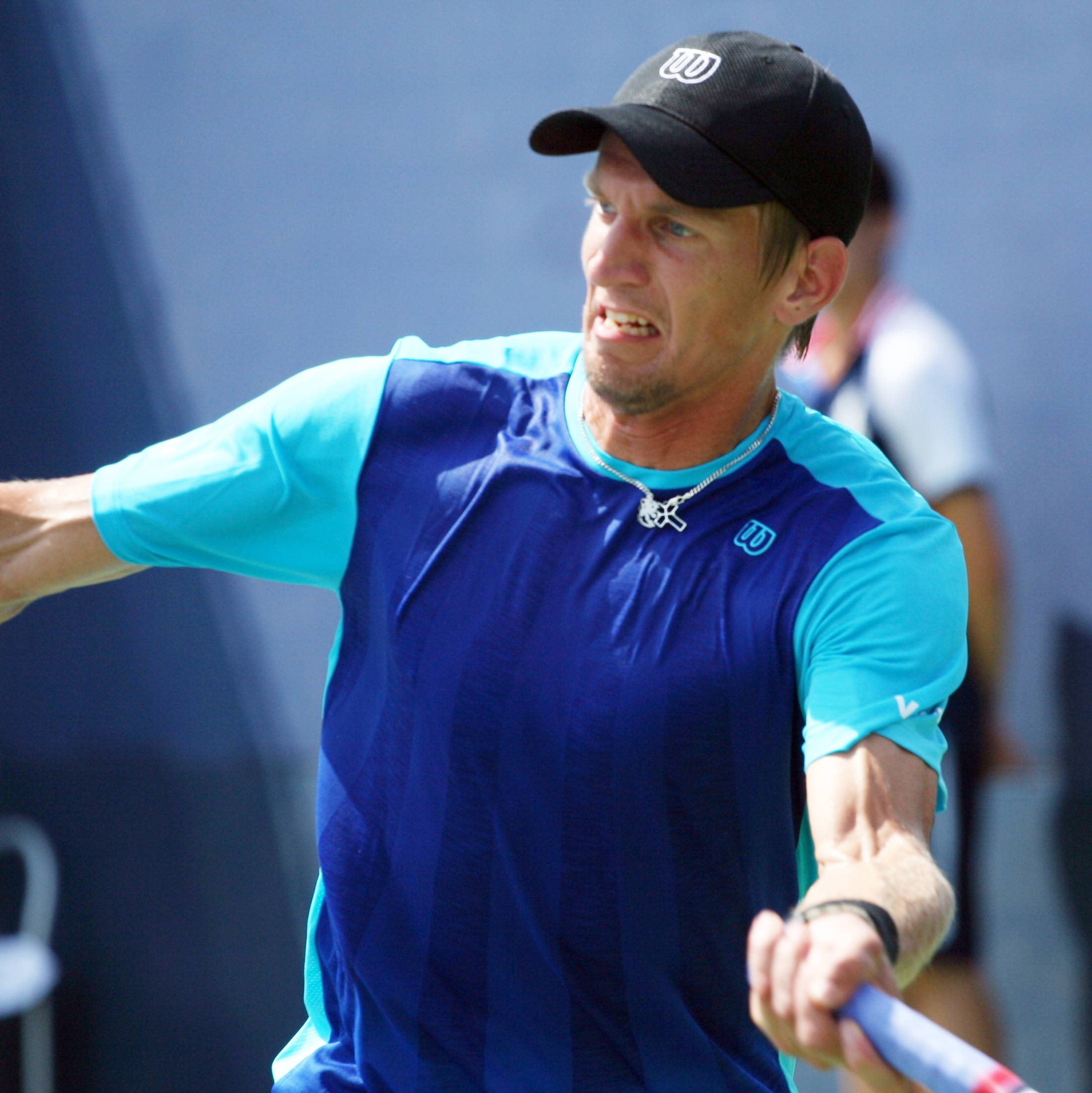
Jarkko Nieminen

As of 6 May 2020

Player	W-L (Total)	W-L (Singles)	W-L (Doubles)	Ties	Debut	Years played
Kimmo Alkio	3–6	2–3	1–3	6	1981	5
George Berner	12–18	10–10	2–8	15	1969	12
Joakim Berner	1–1	1–0	0–1	2	1980	2
Ali Biaudet	0–3	0–2	0–1	1	1932	1
Pentti Forsman	2–13	1–9	1–4	5	1950	4
Arne Grahn	5–13	4–8	1–5	6	1928	5
Runar Granholm	1–3	1–2	0–1	3	1928	3
Bo Grotenfelt	2–15	1–10	1–5	7	1928	6
Heikki Hedman	1–8	0–6	1–2	5	1958	4
Mika Hedman	1–0	0–0	1–0	1	1987	1
Harri Heliövaara	15–19	9–14	6–5	18	2008	11
Mikko Horsma	0–2	0–0	0–2	2	1975	2
Kimmo Hurme	1–0	1–0	0–0	1	1989	1
Tapio Jokinen	0–3	0–3	0–0	2	1960	2
Tarmo Jokinen	1–1	1–1	0–0	1	1968	1
Lassi Ketola	0–1	0–0	0–1	1	2004	1
Tuomas Ketola	28–34	16–22	12–12	31	1993	15
Lauri Kiiski	2–2	0–1	2–1	4	2002	3
Matti Kinnunen	0–4	0–1	0–3	4	1958	4
Henri Kontinen	21–10	6–4	15–6	21	2008	12
Micke Kontinen	2–8	2–7	0–1	8	2011	4
Lars-Henrik Krause	0–3	0–2	0–1	2	1954	2
Henri Laaksonen	1–0	1–0	0–0	1	2009	1
Tommi Lenho	3–2	3–0	0–2	4	1994	4
Curt Lincoln	0–1	0–0	0–1	1	1954	1
Alexander Lindholm	0–1	0–0	0–1	1	1993	1
Ville Liukko	19–13	12–8	7–5	15	1994	7
Jukka Narakka	1–1	0–0	1–1	2	1974	1
Jarkko Nieminen	63–27	48–11	15–16	35	1999	18
Timo Nieminen	2–13	2–12	0–1	12	2002	7
Patrik Niklas-Salminen	4–4	2–3	2–1	6	2016	5
Tapio Nurminen	1–5	1–5	0–0	5	1994	5
Reino Nyyssönen	10–17	7–12	3–5	10	1955	8
Janne Ojala	0–2	0–2	0–0	2	2003	2
Leo Palin	20–18	15–9	5–9	15	1977	9
Veli Paloheimo	15–16	11–11	4–5	12	1986	6
Juho Paukku	2–13	2–11	0–2	10	2004	7
Pekka Petersen-Dyggve	3–4	2–4	1–0	3	1963	2
Herkko Pöllänen	1–3	1–2	0–0	3	2012	3
Olli Rahnasto	26–25	17–12	9–13	24	1982	14
Aki Rahunen	6–4	6–4	0–0	5	1990	3
Emil Ruusuvuori	5–5	5–4	0–1	5	2017	3
Pekka Säilä	9–27	7–16	2–11	15	1962	13
Sakari Salo	17–29	13–16	4–13	17	1950	13
Henrik Sillanpää	0–2	0–2	0–0	2	2015	1
Sten Stahle	0–2	0–2	0–0	1	1965	1
Rauno Suominen	1–7	1–4	0–3	4	1965	4
Kristian Tammivuori	0–1	0–1	0–0-	1	1978	1
Kim Tiilikainen	9–6	9–5	0–1	9	1995	5
Matti Timonen	15–20	12–15	3–5	15	1972	11
Reijo Tuomola	1–0	0–0	1–0	1	1979	1
Eero Vasa	0–3	0–3	0–0	3	2016	2
Otto Virtanen	1–1	1–1	0–0	1	2020	1
Pasi Virtanen	0–3	0–1	0–2	3	1991	3
