= Derek Arthurs =

Irish tennis player (1940–2008)

- Full name: Derek John Michael Arthurs
- Country (sports): (Republic of Ireland) Ireland
- Born: 23 March 1940 Belfast, Northern Ireland
- Died: 7 June 2008 (aged 68)
- Plays: Right-handed

Singles
- Career record: 3–5 (Davis Cup)

Doubles
- Career record: 1–5 (Davis Cup)

Grand Slam mixed doubles results
- Wimbledon: 2R (1964)

Derek John Michael Arthurs (23 March 1940 – 7 June 2008) was an Irish tennis player.

An Irish junior champion, Arthurs was active on the tennis tour during the 1960s. He combined his early career with engineering studies at Queens University in his native Belfast and represented Ireland at the 1961 Summer Universiade in Sofia. In 1962, Arthurs debuted for Ireland in the Davis Cup, playing a tie against Austria. His best performance came in the 1964 Davis Cup when he had a five set win over Switzerland's Dimitri Sturdza in a deciding fifth rubber. This set up a second round tie against Great Britain at Eastbourne which they lost heavily.

Arthurs was also an Irish international representative in squash.

Immigrating to Australia in 1966, Arthurs coached his adoptive country in badminton while based in Adelaide, before settling in Melbourne. He was the father of Australian tennis player Wayne Arthurs.

== See also ==
- List of Ireland Davis Cup team representatives
