= 1952 Davis Cup America Zone =

Regional zone of the 1952 Davis Cup

The America Zone was one of the two regional zones of the 1952 Davis Cup.

5 teams entered the America Zone, with the winner going on to compete in the Inter-Zonal Zone against the winners of the Europe Zone and Eastern Zone. The United States defeated Canada in the final and progressed to the Inter-Zonal Zone.

== Draw ==
Quarterfinals; 25–27 July
Cincinnati, OH, United States (grass)
Japan	0
United States	5
Cuba
bye
bye
Mexico
bye
Canada

Semifinals; 1–3 August
Havana, Cuba
United States	5
Cuba	0
Montreal, Canada (grass)
Mexico	0
Canada	5

Final; 8–10 August
Montreal, Canada (grass)
United States	4
Canada	1

== Quarterfinals ==
=== United States vs. Japan ===
United States
5
Cincinnati Tennis Club, Cincinnati, OH, United States
25–27 July 1952
Grass

Japan
0

			1	2	3	4	5
1	(United States) (Japan)	Art Larsen; Jiro Kumamaru	6; 2	3; 6	6; 3	6; 2
2	(United States) (Japan)	Vic Seixas; Atsushi Miyagi	6; 3	6; 1	6; 0
3	(United States) (Japan)	Gardnar Mulloy / Bill Talbert; Jiro Kumamaru / Fumiteru Nakano	6; 2	3; 6	6; 3	6; 2
4	(United States) (Japan)	Vic Seixas; Fumiteru Nakano	6; 2	6; 1	6; 2
5	(United States) (Japan)	Art Larsen; Atsushi Miyagi	6; 1	3; 6	6; 1	5; 7	6; 3

== Semifinals ==
=== Cuba vs. United States ===
Cuba
0
Velado Tennis Club, Havana, Cuba
1–3 August 1952

United States
5

			1	2	3	4	5
1	(Cuba) (United States)	Juan Weiss; Hugh Stewart	5; 7	0; 6	4; 6
2	(Cuba) (United States)	Orlando Garrido; Tut Bartzen	0; 6	2; 6	1; 6
3	(Cuba) (United States)	José Agüero / Juan Weiss; Gardnar Mulloy / Hugh Stewart	0; 6	4; 6	2; 6
4	(Cuba) (United States)	Reynaldo Garrido; Tut Bartzen	2; 6	1; 6	0; 6
5	(Cuba) (United States)	Orlando Garrido; Hugh Stewart	8; 10	3; 6	0; 6

=== Canada vs. Mexico ===
Canada
5
Mount Royal Tennis Club, Montreal, Canada
1–3 August 1952
Grass

Mexico
0

			1	2	3	4	5
1	(Canada) (Mexico)	Lorne Main; Pedro Vega	6; 2	6; 0	6; 2
2	(Canada) (Mexico)	Brendan Macken; Mario Llamas	3; 6	4; 6	6; 1	6; 1	6; 4
3	(Canada) (Mexico)	Lorne Main / Henri Rochon; Manuel Galeana / Mario Llamas	6; 3	6; 2	6; 4
4	(Canada) (Mexico)	Brendan Macken; Manuel Galeana	6; 2	6; 3	6; 4
5	(Canada) (Mexico)	Lorne Main; Mario Llamas	6; 4	3; 6	6; 8	6; 4	6; 1

== Final ==
=== Canada vs. United States ===
Canada
1
Mount Royal Tennis Club, Montreal, Canada
8–10 August 1952
Grass

United States
4

			1	2	3	4	5
1	(Canada) (United States)	Henri Rochon; Herbie Flam	2; 6	6; 8	2; 6
2	(Canada) (United States)	Lorne Main; Vic Seixas	2; 6	3; 6	4; 6
3	(Canada) (United States)	Brendan Macken / Lorne Main; Herbie Flam / Vic Seixas	3; 6	6; 3	3; 6	4; 6
4	(Canada) (United States)	Lorne Main; Herbie Flam	2; 6	2; 6	3; 6
5	(Canada) (United States)	Brendan Macken; Bob Perry	6; 3	11; 13	6; 4	6; 4
