= Åke Eliaeson =

Swedish tennis player

- Country (sports): Sweden
- Born: 26 May 1923
- Died: 24 January 2015 (aged 91); Lidingö, Sweden
- Turned pro: 1941(amateur tour)
- Retired: 1967
- Plays: Right–handed

Singles
- Career titles: 2(amateur tour)

Grand Slam singles results
- US Open: 1R (1950)

Hans Ivar Åke Eliaeson (26 May 1923 – 24 January 2015) was a Swedish tennis player.

== Tennis career ==
Eliaeson represented the Swedish Davis Cup team in the 1952 Europe Zone second round tie against Chile. He played the last singles rubber in Sweden's 5–0 victory.

Eliaeson played in one Grand Slam tournament, the 1950 US Open, where he lost to Sam Match. Eliaeson won two amateur tournament titles, in 1951 at the Helsinki indoor event and in 1952 in Bad Schwartau, Germany.

== See also ==
- List of Sweden Davis Cup team representatives
