= Luxembourg Tennis Federation =

Tennis governing body

Fédération Luxembourgeoise de Tennis
- Sport: Tennis
- Jurisdiction: National
- Abbreviation: (FLT)
- Founded: May 14, 1946
- Affiliation: International Tennis Federation
- Regional affiliation: Tennis Europe
- Headquarters: Bvd Hubert Clement, Esch-sur-Alzette
- President: Claude Lamberty

Official website
- www.flt.lu
- (Luxembourg)

The Luxembourg Tennis Federation (French: Fédération Luxembourgeoise de Tennis) is the tennis governing body in Luxembourg and responsible for the development of the game in the country.

== Tennis in Luxembourg ==
Tennis is a popular sport, as it is across western Europe. There are 53 tennis clubs in the country, the oldest of which (TC Diekirch) was founded in 1902. The governing body is the Luxembourg Tennis Federation. The Luxembourg Open was held in Luxembourg (Kockelscheuer) until 2021, and was ranked as a WTA International tournament on the WTA Tour.

Luxembourgers have had little success in professional tennis. Gilles Müller, considered the best men's player the country has ever produced, reached the quarter-finals of the 2008 U.S. Open and the 2017 Wimbledon Championships, has two ATP Titles and has a career high ranking of 21st. Women's players that have reached the top fifty include Anne Kremer (18th), Karin Kschwendt (37th) and Claudine Schaul (41st).

== List of presidents ==
- Alex Servais (1946–1948)
- Georges Reuter (1949–1962)
- Géza Wertheim (1963–1965)
- Frantz Think (1966–1968)
- Josy Dunkel (1969–1972)
- Georges Weyrich (1973–1978)
- Georges Logelin (1979–1986)
- Michel Wolter (1987–1993)
- Paul Helminger (1994–2003)
- Yves Kemp (2003 - 2013)
- Claude Lamberty (2013 - )
