= 1950 Davis Cup America Zone =

International tennis competition

The America Zone was one of the two regional zones of the 1950 Davis Cup.

4 teams entered the America Zone, with the winner going on to compete in the Inter-Zonal Final against the winner of the Europe Zone. Australia defeated Mexico in the final, and went on to face Sweden in the Inter-Zonal Final.

== Draw ==
Semifinals; 7–16 July
Montreal, Canada (grass)
Australia	5
Canada	0
Havana, Cuba
Cuba	0
Mexico	5

Final; 28–30 July
Mexico City, Mexico (clay)
Australia	4
Mexico	1

== Semifinals ==
=== Canada vs. Australia ===
Canada
0
Mount Royal Tennis Club, Montreal, Canada
14–16 July 1950
Grass

Australia
5

			1	2	3	4	5
1	(Canada) (Australia)	Brendan Macken; Frank Sedgman	5; 7	2; 6	1; 6
2	(Canada) (Australia)	Lorne Main; Ken McGregor	1; 6	2; 6	5; 7
3	(Canada) (Australia)	George Robinson / Henri Rochon; John Bromwich / Frank Sedgman	2; 6	4; 6	4; 6
4	(Canada) (Australia)	Lorne Main; Frank Sedgman	1; 6	2; 6	3; 6
5	(Canada) (Australia)	Brendan Macken; Ken McGregor	4; 6	4; 6	4; 6

=== Cuba vs. Mexico ===
Cuba
0
Havana, Cuba
7–9 July 1950

Mexico
5

			1	2	3	4	5
1	(Cuba) (Mexico)	Juan Weiss; Anselmo Puente	7; 5	5; 7	6; 1	1; 6	5; 7
2	(Cuba) (Mexico)	José Agüero; Gustavo Palafox	6; 1	2; 6	1; 6	3; 6
3	(Cuba) (Mexico)	José Agüero / Juan Weiss; Alfredo Millet / Gustavo Palafox	1; 6	4; 6	7; 9
4	(Cuba) (Mexico)	Joffre Etcheverry; Rafael Ortega	5; 7	2; 6	6; 2	4; 6
5	(Cuba) (Mexico)	Orlando Garrido; Alfredo Millet	1; 6	2; 6	3; 6

== Final ==
=== Mexico vs. Australia ===
Mexico
1
Centro Deportivo Chapultepec, Mexico City, Mexico
28–30 July 1950
Clay

Australia
4

			1	2	3	4	5
1	(Mexico) (Australia)	Armando Vega; Frank Sedgman	6; 2	4; 6	2; 6	6; 4	2; 6
2	(Mexico) (Australia)	Gustavo Palafox; Ken McGregor	6; 4	6; 4	6; 8	3; 6	6; 3
3	(Mexico) (Australia)	Gustavo Palafox / Armando Vega; John Bromwich / Frank Sedgman	4; 6	5; 7	2; 6
4	(Mexico) (Australia)	Gustavo Palafox; Frank Sedgman	4; 6	4; 6	2; 6
5	(Mexico) (Australia)	Armando Vega; John Bromwich	6; 3	0; 6	2; 6	2; 6
