= Pentti Forsman =

Finnish tennis player (1917–2006)

- Country (sports): Finland
- Born: 1 August 1917 Turku, Finland
- Died: 24 January 2006 (aged 88) Espoo, Finland
- Turned pro: 1938 (amateur tour)
- Retired: 1955

Grand Slam singles results
- Wimbledon: 2R (1949)

Grand Slam doubles results
- Wimbledon: 1R (1949)

Pentti Gunnar Forsman (1 August 1917 – 24 January 2006) was a tennis player from Finland.

== Tennis career ==
Forsman represented Finland from 1950 to 1953 in the Davis Cup competition. He made his Davis Cup debut during the 1950 Europe Zone first round tie against Belgium. During his Davis Cup career, Forsman played in ten Davis Cup singles rubbers and in five doubles rubbers, with one victory in each.

Forsman participated at the 1949 Wimbledon Championships playing in the singles and doubles, teaming up with Sakari Salo in the doubles.

== See also ==
- List of Finland Davis Cup team representatives
