= Ernesto Aguirre (tennis) =

Chilean tennis player

- Country (sports): Chile

Singles

Grand Slam singles results
- French Open: 2R (1960, 1962, 1966)
- Wimbledon: 1R (1957, 1958)
- US Open: 2R (1964)

Ernesto Aguirre is a Chilean former tennis player.

Aguirre, a football player in his youth, was a member of the Chile Davis Cup team from 1959 to 1967, featuring in a total of 15 ties. He won four singles and seven doubles rubbers. His appearances included an America Zone final against the ultimate champions Australia in 1964. He featured in the singles second round of the French Championships on three occasions and played mixed doubles on tour with Virginia Wade, including at Wimbledon.

== See also ==
- List of Chile Davis Cup team representatives
