= 1953 Davis Cup =

1953 edition of the Davis Cup

Details
- Duration: 24 April – 31 December 1953
- Edition: 42nd
- Teams: 30

Champion
- Winning nation: Australia

The 1953 Davis Cup was the 42nd edition of the Davis Cup, the most important tournament between national teams in men's tennis. 24 teams entered the Europe Zone, 6 teams entered the America Zone, and India was the sole competitor in the Eastern Zone. This year saw the first appearances in the competition of both Ceylon and a team representing the West Indies. For the first time play took place on the African continent, when the first-round Europe Zone tie between Egypt and Austria was held in Cairo.

The United States defeated Canada in the America Zone final, and Belgium defeated Denmark in the Europe Zone final. In the Inter-Zonal Zone, Belgium defeated India in the semifinal, and then lost to the United States in the final. In the Challenge Round the United States were defeated by the defending champions Australia. The final was played at Kooyong Stadium in Melbourne, Australia on 28–31 December.

== America Zone ==
=== Draw ===
Quarterfinals; 11–20 July
Vancouver, Canada (grass)
Japan	0
United States	5
Caribbean/West Indies
bye
bye
Cuba
Montreal, Canada (grass)
Mexico	2
Canada	3

Semifinals; 25 July–10 August
Kingston, Jamaica (grass)
United States	5
Caribbean/West Indies	0
Montreal, Canada (grass)
Cuba	2
Canada	3

Final; 14–16 September
Montreal, Canada (grass)
United States	5
Canada	0

=== Final ===
Canada vs. United States

Canada
0
Mount Royal Tennis Club, Montreal, Canada
14–16 September 1953
Grass

United States
5

			1	2	3	4	5
1	(Canada) (United States)	Henri Rochon; Tony Trabert	2; 6	3; 6	6; 8
2	(Canada) (United States)	Lorne Main; Vic Seixas	1; 6	1; 6	4; 6
3	(Canada) (United States)	Lorne Main / Paul Willey; Vic Seixas / Tony Trabert	6; 3	2; 6	3; 6	2; 6
4	(Canada) (United States)	Paul Willey; Straight Clark	5; 7	2; 6	0; 6
5	(Canada) (United States)	Robert Bédard; Tut Bartzen	4; 6	5; 7	6; 1	0; 6

== Europe Zone ==
=== Draw ===
First Round; 24 April–5 May
West Germany
bye
South Africa	w/o
Monaco
France
bye
Yugoslavia	5
Switzerland	0
Denmark
bye
Egypt	1
Austria	4
Philippines
bye
Finland	4
Ireland	1
Spain	5
Israel	0
bye
Sweden
Netherlands	5
Ceylon	0
bye
Italy
Luxembourg	0
Norway	5
bye
Great Britain
Brazil
Hungary	w/o
bye
Belgium

Second Round; 13–19 May
West Berlin
West Germany	3
South Africa	2
Zagreb, Yugoslavia
France	4
Yugoslavia	1
Vienna, Austria (clay)
Denmark	5
Austria	0
Helsinki, Finland
Philippines	5
Finland	0
Barcelona, Spain (clay)
Spain	0
Sweden	5
Scheveningen, Netherlands (clay)
Netherlands	0
Italy	5
Oslo, Norway (clay)
Norway	0
Great Britain	5
Budapest, Hungary
Hungary	0
Belgium	5

Quarterfinals; 10–14 June
Paris, France (clay)
West Germany	1
France	4
Copenhagen, Denmark (clay)
Denmark	4
Philippines	1
Turin, Italy (clay)
Sweden	1
Italy	4
Brussels, Belgium (clay)
Great Britain	1
Belgium	4

Semifinals; 10–13 July
Paris, France (clay)
France	1
Denmark	4
Brussels, Belgium
Italy	2
Belgium	3

Final; 18–20 July
Copenhagen, Denmark (clay)
Denmark	2
Belgium	3

=== Final ===
Denmark vs. Belgium

Denmark
2
Copenhagen, Denmark
18–20 July 1953
Clay

Belgium
3

			1	2	3	4	5
1	(Denmark) (Belgium)	Kurt Nielsen; Jacques Brichant	6; 1	7; 5	3; 6	3; 6	6; 3
2	(Denmark) (Belgium)	Torben Ulrich; Philippe Washer	6; 4	4; 6	5; 7	1; 6
3	(Denmark) (Belgium)	Kurt Nielsen / Torben Ulrich; Jacques Brichant / Philippe Washer	6; 4	6; 3	7; 9	1; 6	4; 6
4	(Denmark) (Belgium)	Torben Ulrich; Jacques Brichant	5; 7	7; 5	3; 6	3; 6
5	(Denmark) (Belgium)	Kurt Nielsen; Philippe Washer	8; 6	6; 8	6; 2	6; 4

== Inter-Zonal Zone ==
=== Draw ===
Semifinals; 3–5 December
Perth, Australia (grass)
EUR	Belgium	5
EAS	India	0
bye
AME	United States

Final; 17–19 December
Brisbane, Australia (grass)
EUR	Belgium	1
AME	United States	4

=== Semifinals ===
Belgium vs. India

Belgium
5
Perth, Australia
3–5 December 1953
Grass

India
0

			1	2	3	4	5
1	(Belgium) (India)	Philippe Washer; Sumant Misra	6; 3	6; 4	6; 3
2	(Belgium) (India)	Jacques Brichant; Ramanathan Krishnan	3; 6	3; 6	6; 4	6; 3	6; 0
3	(Belgium) (India)	Jacques Brichant / Philippe Washer; Ramanathan Krishnan / Sumant Misra	6; 8	6; 3	7; 5	7; 5
4	(Belgium) (India)	Philippe Washer; Ramanathan Krishnan	6; 1	6; 1	6; 1
5	(Belgium) (India)	Jacques Brichant; Sumant Misra	6; 4	4; 6	7; 5	6; 4

=== Final ===
United States vs. Belgium

United States
4
Milton Courts, Brisbane, Australia
17–19 December 1953
Grass

Belgium
1

			1	2	3	4	5
1	(United States) (Belgium)	Tony Trabert; Philippe Washer	6; 4	6; 2	6; 4
2	(United States) (Belgium)	Vic Seixas; Jacques Brichant	3; 6	9; 11	6; 2	1; 6
3	(United States) (Belgium)	Bill Talbert / Tony Trabert; Jacques Brichant / Philippe Washer	6; 3	6; 2	4; 6	9; 7
4	(United States) (Belgium)	Tony Trabert; Jacques Brichant	6; 4	6; 3	6; 1
5	(United States) (Belgium)	Vic Seixas; Philippe Washer	6; 2	7; 5	8; 6

== Challenge Round ==
Australia vs. United States

Australia
3
Kooyong Stadium, Melbourne, Australia
28–31 December 1953
Grass

United States
2

			1	2	3	4	5
1	(Australia) (United States)	Lew Hoad; Vic Seixas	6; 4	6; 2	6; 3
2	(Australia) (United States)	Ken Rosewall; Tony Trabert	3; 6	4; 6	4; 6
3	(Australia) (United States)	Rex Hartwig / Lew Hoad; Vic Seixas / Tony Trabert	2; 6	4; 6	4; 6
4	(Australia) (United States)	Lew Hoad; Tony Trabert	13; 11	6; 3	2; 6	3; 6	7; 5
5	(Australia) (United States)	Ken Rosewall; Vic Seixas	6; 2	2; 6	6; 3	6; 4
