= Jan Hajer =

Dutch tennis player (1942–2002)

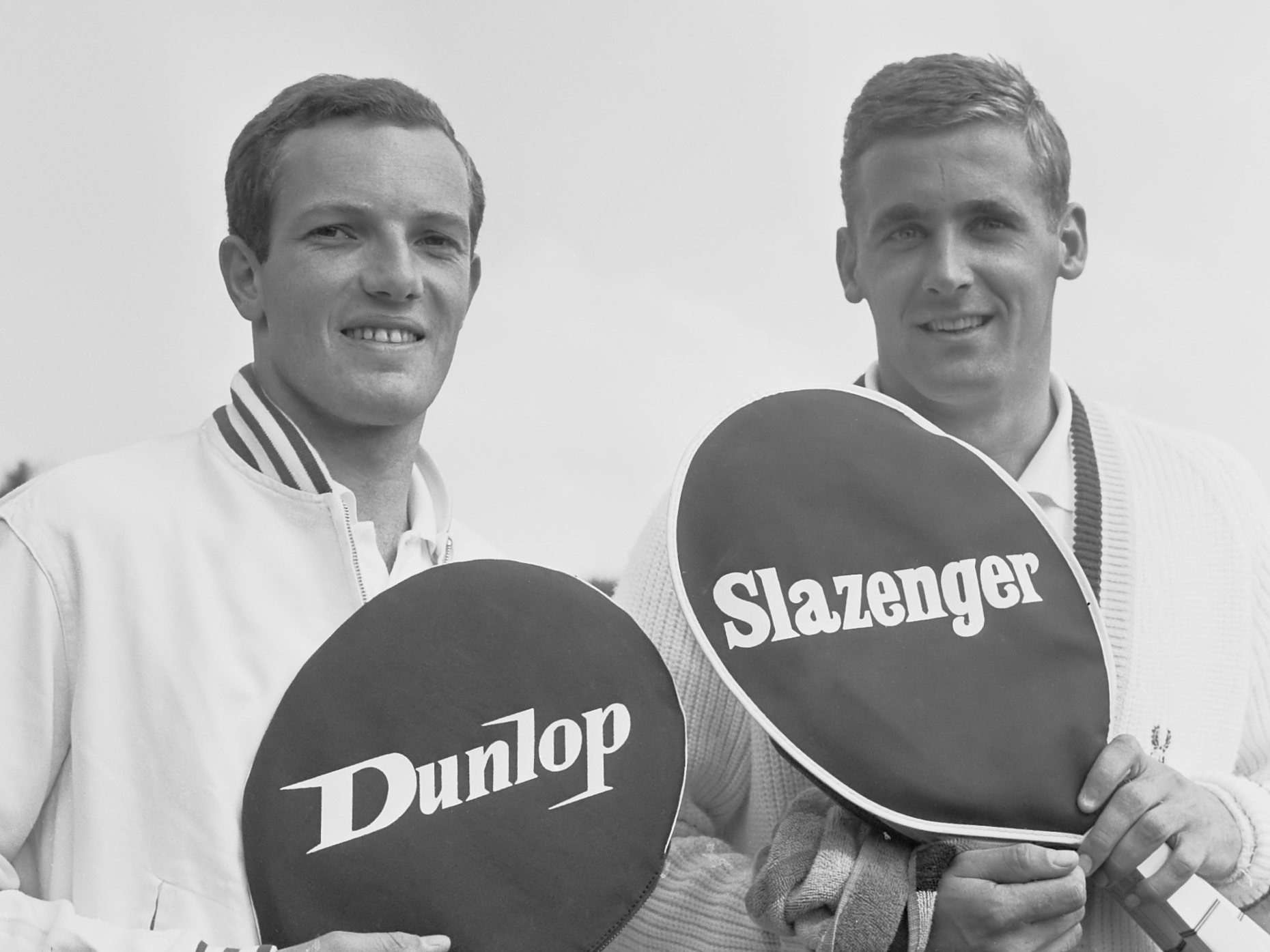
- Jan Hajer (r) with Tom Okker
- Country (sports): Netherlands
- Born: 31 March 1942; The Hague
- Died: 27 August 2002; Breda

Singles

Grand Slam singles results
- Australian Open: 1965 (R64)
- Wimbledon: 1967 (R64)
- US Open: 1963 (R64)

Doubles

Grand Slam doubles results
- Australian Open: 1965 (QF)

Jan Hajer (The Hague, 31 March 1942 - Breda, 27 August 2002) was a Dutch tennis player. He was the national champion in 1963. He represented the Netherlands in the Davis-Cup between 1964 and 1968.

== Biography ==
Hajer was a contemporary of Tom Okker who overshadowed Hajer's career. The two were teammates in the Haarlem Lawn Tennis Club.

Hajer won the 1963 national championships, succeeding Willem Maris who was Dutch national champion in 1962. In 1964 Jan Hajer lost the final against Tom Okker. Later Hajer and Okker represented the Netherlands in the Davis Cup team. Hajer played 18 singles matches in seven Davis Cup ties, scoring 5 victories and 13 losses. His most famous win was over Cliff Drysdale in the 1967 Davis Cup.

Hajer participated in Wimbledon three times. In 1967 he reached the second round which he lost in five sets to Jaidip Mukerjea. Hajer and Okker competed in doubles events in South Africa, Philippines and Australia.
