= Nazmi Bari =

Turkish tennis player

- Country (sports): Turkey
- Born: 13 November 1929
- Died: 20 September 2008 (aged 78)

Singles

Grand Slam singles results
- US Open: 1R (1963)

Nazmi Bari (13 November 1929 – 20 September 2008) was a Turkish national tennis player.
