= Géza Wertheim =

Luxembourgish tennis player and bobsledder

Géza Wertheim (3 July 1910 – 10 August 1979) was a Luxembourgish tennis player and bobsledder.

He made thirty appearances for Luxembourg in the Davis Cup between 1947 and 1957, losing all thirty. He later became President of the Luxembourg Tennis Federation.

He also competed for Luxembourg in the two-man bobsleigh at the 1936 Winter Olympics in Garmisch-Partenkirchen, where the team of Wertheim and Raoul Weckbecker, finished last of twenty-two.

Sporting positions
Preceded by Georges Reuter	President of the FLT; 1963 – 1965	Succeeded by Frantz Think
