= 1964 Davis Cup =

1964 edition of the Davis Cup

Details
- Duration: 29 February – 28 September 1964
- Edition: 53rd
- Teams: 46

Champion
- Winning nation: Australia

The 1964 Davis Cup was the 53rd edition of the Davis Cup, the most important tournament between national teams in men's tennis. 32 teams entered the Europe Zone, 10 teams entered the Eastern Zone, and 7 teams entered the America Zone. Bulgaria and South Vietnam made their first appearances in the tournament.

Due to the increase in the number of entries, a number of changes were made for this year's tournament. In the Eastern Zone the participating countries were split into two sub-zones, with the winner of each sub-zone playing to determine which team moved to the Inter-Zonal Zone. In the Europe Zone the previous year's semifinalists were no longer granted byes into the second round, however seeding was still in place to ensure that these countries could not meet before the semifinals.

Australia defeated Chile in the America Zone final, the Philippines defeated India in the Eastern Inter-Zonal final, and Sweden defeated France in the Europe Zone final. In the Inter-Zonal Zone, Sweden defeated the Philippines in the semifinal, and were then defeated by Australia in the final. Australia defeated the defending champions the United States in the Challenge Round. The final was played at the Harold Clark Courts in Cleveland, Ohio, United States on 25–28 September.

== America Zone ==
=== Draw ===
Quarterfinals; 17–20 July
Chile
bye
Venezuela
Caribbean/West Indies	w/o
Mexico City, Mexico (clay)
Mexico	3
New Zealand	1
Montreal, Canada (clay)
Canada	0
Australia	5

Semifinals; May–August
Bridgetown, Barbados
Chile	3
Caribbean/West Indies	2
Mexico City, Mexico (clay)
Mexico	1
Australia	4

Final; 14–16 August
Minneapolis, MN, United States (hard)
Chile	0
Australia	5

=== Final ===
Australia vs. Chile

Australia
5
Nicollet Tennis Club, Minneapolis, MN, United States
14–16 August 1964
Hard

Chile
0

			1	2	3	4	5
1	(Australia) (Chile)	Fred Stolle; Patricio Cornejo	6; 1	6; 0	6; 0
2	(Australia) (Chile)	Roy Emerson; Patricio Rodríguez	6; 3	6; 2	8; 6
3	(Australia) (Chile)	Roy Emerson / Fred Stolle; Ernesto Aguirre / Patricio Rodríguez	6; 4	6; 4	6; 4
4	(Australia) (Chile)	John Newcombe; Ernesto Aguirre	6; 2	6; 2	6; 4
5	(Australia) (Chile)	Fred Stolle; Patricio Rodríguez	6; 0	6; 4	6; 4

== Eastern Zone ==
=== Zone A ===
Semifinals; 3–5 April
Manila, Philippines
Philippines	4
South Korea	1
bye
Japan

Final; 10–12 April
Manila, Philippines
Philippines	5
Japan	0

=== Zone B ===
Quarterfinals; 29 February–2 March
Pakistan
bye
Hyderabad, India
India	5
Ceylon	0
Kuala Lumpur, Malaysia
Malaysia	0
South Vietnam	5
Burma
Iran	w/o

Semifinals; 13–15 March; 3–5 April
Lahore, Pakistan
Pakistan	0
India	4
Tehran, Iran
South Vietnam	3
Iran	2

Final; 17–19 April
Saigon, South Vietnam
India	5
South Vietnam	0

=== Eastern Inter-Zonal Final ===
Philippines vs. India

Philippines
3
Manila, Philippines
24–26 April 1964

India
2

			1	2	3	4	5
1	(Philippines) (India)	Juan-Johnson José; Jaidip Mukerjea	5; 7	6; 3	3; 6	2; 6
2	(Philippines) (India)	Felicisimo Ampon; Premjit Lall	6; 0	6; 3	7; 5
3	(Philippines) (India)	Raymundo Deyro / Juan-Johnson José; Premjit Lall / Jaidip Mukerjea	3; 6	6; 1	6; 3	2; 6	7; 9
4	(Philippines) (India)	Felicisimo Ampon; Jaidip Mukerjea	6; 4	6; 1	6; 1
5	(Philippines) (India)	Juan-Johnson José; Premjit Lall	6; 4	8; 6	3; 6	6; 4

== Europe Zone ==
=== Draw ===
First Round; 28 April–3 May
Great Britain	5
Austria	0
Ireland	3
Switzerland	2
Yugoslavia	3
Luxembourg	0
Turkey	0
Argentina	5
South Africa	w/o
Poland
Portugal	1
Norway	4
France	5
Bulgaria	0
Hungary	2
Netherlands	3
Morocco	1
Soviet Union	4
Belgium	0
West Germany	5
Denmark	5
Finland	0
Brazil	1
Spain	4
Israel	1
Rhodesia	4
Egypt	1
Italy	4
Czechoslovakia	w/o
Romania
Greece	1
Sweden	4

Second Round; 10–18 May
Eastbourne, England (grass)
Great Britain	5
Ireland	0
Belgrade, Yugoslavia
Yugoslavia	5
Argentina	0
Oslo, Norway (clay)
South Africa	5
Norway	0
Paris, France (clay)
France	5
Netherlands	0
Düsseldorf, West Germany
Soviet Union	1
West Germany	4
Copenhagen, Denmark (clay)
Denmark	3
Spain	2
Genoa, Italy (clay)
Rhodesia	0
Italy	5
Prague, Czechoslovakia (clay)
Czechoslovakia	0
Sweden	5

Quarterfinals; 11–14 June
Manchester, England (grass)
Great Britain	3
Yugoslavia	2
Paris, France (clay)
South Africa	2
France	3
Munich, West Germany (clay)
West Germany	4
Denmark	1
Turin, Italy (clay)
Italy	1
Sweden	3

Semifinals; 16–19 July
Bristol, England (grass)
Great Britain	2
France	3
Båstad, Sweden (clay)
West Germany	2
Sweden	3

Final; 31 July–3 August
Båstad, Sweden (clay)
France	1
Sweden	4

=== Final ===
Sweden vs. France

Sweden
4
Båstad Tennis Stadium, Båstad, Sweden
31 July–3 August 1964
Clay

France
1

			1	2	3	4	5
1	(Sweden) (France)	Ulf Schmidt; Pierre Darmon	9; 7	8; 6	4; 6	4; 6	1; 6
2	(Sweden) (France)	Jan-Erik Lundqvist; Pierre Barthès	6; 8	6; 1	6; 3	7; 5
3	(Sweden) (France)	Jan-Erik Lundqvist / Ulf Schmidt; Jean-Noël Grinda / François Jauffret	6; 4	9; 7	8; 6
4	(Sweden) (France)	Jan-Erik Lundqvist; Pierre Darmon	3; 6	7; 5	6; 4	6; 1
5	(Sweden) (France)	Ulf Schmidt; Pierre Barthès	6; 2	6; 4	6; 8	6; 2

== Inter-Zonal Zone ==
=== Draw ===
Semifinals; 16–18 August
AME	Australia
bye
Båstad, Sweden (clay)
EAS	Philippines	0
EUR	Sweden	5

Final; 29–31 August
Båstad, Sweden (clay)
AME	Australia	5
EUR	Sweden	0

=== Semifinals ===
Sweden vs. Philippines

Sweden
5
Båstad Tennis Stadium, Båstad, Sweden
16–18 August 1964
Clay

Philippines
0

			1	2	3	4	5
1	(Sweden) (Philippines)	Ulf Schmidt; Felicisimo Ampon	6; 0	6; 1	6; 2
2	(Sweden) (Philippines)	Jan-Erik Lundqvist; Juan-Johnson José	6; 1	3; 6	6; 1	6; 0
3	(Sweden) (Philippines)	Jan-Erik Lundqvist / Ulf Schmidt; Raymundo Deyro / Juan-Johnson José	6; 3	5; 7	6; 3	6; 3
4	(Sweden) (Philippines)	Jan-Erik Lundqvist; Felicisimo Ampon	6; 1	6; 1	6; 4
5	(Sweden) (Philippines)	Ulf Schmidt; Juan-Johnson José	6; 2	6; 1	6; 2

=== Final ===
Sweden vs. Australia

Sweden
0
Båstad Tennis Stadium, Båstad, Sweden
29–31 August 1964
Clay

Australia
5

			1	2	3	4	5
1	(Sweden) (Australia)	Jan-Erik Lundqvist; Roy Emerson	6; 2	6; 4	3; 6	2; 6	5; 7
2	(Sweden) (Australia)	Ulf Schmidt; Fred Stolle	4; 6	3; 6	8; 10
3	(Sweden) (Australia)	Jan-Erik Lundqvist / Ulf Schmidt; Roy Emerson / Fred Stolle	2; 6	1; 6	0; 6
4	(Sweden) (Australia)	Ulf Schmidt; Roy Emerson	6; 3	4; 6	3; 6	2; 6
5	(Sweden) (Australia)	Jan-Erik Lundqvist; Fred Stolle	7; 5	4; 6	0; 6	3; 6

== Challenge Round ==
United States vs. Australia

United States
2
Harold Clark Courts, Cleveland, OH, United States
25–28 September 1964
Clay

Australia
3

			1	2	3	4	5
1	(United States) (Australia)	Chuck McKinley; Fred Stolle	6; 1	9; 7	4; 6	6; 2
2	(United States) (Australia)	Dennis Ralston; Roy Emerson	3; 6	4; 6	2; 6
3	(United States) (Australia)	Chuck McKinley / Dennis Ralston; Roy Emerson / Fred Stolle	6; 4	4; 6	4; 6	6; 3	6; 4
4	(United States) (Australia)	Dennis Ralston; Fred Stolle	5; 7	3; 6	6; 3	11; 9	4; 6
5	(United States) (Australia)	Chuck McKinley; Roy Emerson	6; 3	2; 6	4; 6	4; 6
