= Sakari Salo =

Finnish tennis player (1919–2011)

- Country (sports): Finland
- Born: 21 December 1919 Helsinki, Finland
- Died: 13 December 2011 (aged 91) Espoo, Finland
- Turned pro: 1939 (amateur tour)
- Retired: 1967

Grand Slam singles results
- Wimbledon: 1R (1949, 1952)

Grand Slam doubles results
- Wimbledon: 1R (1949, 1952)

Grand Slam mixed doubles results
- Wimbledon: 3R (1952)
Medal record
Men's bandy
Representing Finland
Olympic Games (demonstration sport)
Bronze medal – third place	1952 Oslo	Team

Sakari Salo (21 December 1919 – 13 December 2011) was a tennis and bandy player from Finland.

== Tennis career ==
Salo represented Finland from 1950 to 1963 in the Davis Cup competition. He made his Davis Cup debut during the 1950 Europe Zone first round tie against Belgium. During his Davis Cup career, Salo played in twenty-nine Davis Cup singles rubbers, winning thirteen, and in seventeen doubles rubbers, with four victories.

Salo participated at the 1952 Wimbledon Championships playing in the singles, doubles and mixed doubles. In the mixed doubles, he partnered with his wife Thelma Salo, and reached the third round.

== Bandy career ==
Salo represented Finland at the 1952 Winter Olympics in Oslo when bandy was held as a demonstration sport. He won a bronze medal as a member of the Finnish team.

== See also ==
- List of Finland Davis Cup team representatives
