= Italy Davis Cup team results (1950–1969) =

This is a list of all Italy Davis Cup team results in the period between 1950 and 1979. They played a total of 78 Davis Cup ties.

In this period Italy were Challenge Round finalists (second place) in 1960, Inter-Zonal finalists (third place) in 1952, 1955, and 1958, and Inter-Zonal semifinalists (fourth place) in 1956 and 1959.

== 1950s ==
=== 1950 ===
1950 Davis Cup Europe Zone First Round

Great Britain
2
Devonshire Park Lawn Tennis Club, Eastbourne, England
6–9 May 1950
Grass

Italy
3

			1	2	3	4	5
1	(United Kingdom) (Italy)	Tony Mottram; Giovanni Cucelli	7; 5	3; 6	5; 7	4; 6
2	(United Kingdom) (Italy)	Geoffrey Paish; Marcello del Bello	6; 4	4; 6	6; 3	4; 6	6; 3
3	(United Kingdom) (Italy)	Tony Mottram / Geoffrey Paish; Marcello del Bello / Giovanni Cucelli	7; 9	2; 6	4; 6
4	(United Kingdom) (Italy)	Tony Mottram; Marcello del Bello	6; 3	6; 3	8; 6
5	(United Kingdom) (Italy)	Geoffrey Paish; Giovanni Cucelli	6; 1	2; 6	4; 6	6; 8

1950 Davis Cup Europe Zone Second Round

Luxembourg
0
Mondorf-les-Bains, Luxembourg
20–22 May 1950

Italy
5

			1	2	3	4	5
1	(Luxembourg) (Italy)	Gaston Wampach; Giovanni Cucelli	2; 6	2; 6	1; 6
2	(Luxembourg) (Italy)	Géza Wertheim; Rolando del Bello	1; 6	2; 6	2; 6
3	(Luxembourg) (Italy)	Gaston Wampach / Géza Wertheim; Marcello del Bello / Giovanni Cucelli	0; 6	2; 6	1; 6
4	(Luxembourg) (Italy)	Géza Wertheim; Marcello del Bello	3; 6	0; 6	2; 6
5	(Luxembourg) (Italy)	Gaston Wampach; Rolando del Bello	1; 6	5; 7	4; 6

1950 Davis Cup Europe Zone Quarterfinals

Belgium
2
Brussels, Belgium
16–18 June 1950

Italy
3

			1	2	3	4	5
1	(Belgium) (Italy)	Philippe Washer; Giovanni Cucelli	6; 2	11; 9	6; 4
2	(Belgium) (Italy)	Jacques Brichant; Rolando del Bello	4; 6	1; 6	3; 6
3	(Belgium) (Italy)	Jacques Brichant / Philippe Washer; Rolando del Bello / Giovanni Cucelli	6; 4	2; 6	2; 6	6; 8
4	(Belgium) (Italy)	Philippe Washer; Rolando del Bello	6; 4	6; 1	6; 1
5	(Belgium) (Italy)	Jacques Brichant; Giovanni Cucelli	2; 6	7; 5	4; 6	2; 6

1950 Davis Cup Europe Zone Semifinals

Denmark
4
Copenhagen, Denmark
14–16 July 1950
Clay

Italy
1

			1	2	3	4	5
1	(Denmark) (Italy)	Torben Ulrich; Rolando del Bello	6; 0	6; 2	6; 2
2	(Denmark) (Italy)	Kurt Nielsen; Giovanni Cucelli	6; 3	7; 5	0; 6	0; 6	6; 4
3	(Denmark) (Italy)	Kurt Nielsen / Torben Ulrich; Marcello del Bello / Giovanni Cucelli	2; 6	4; 6	2; 6
4	(Denmark) (Italy)	Kurt Nielsen; Rolando del Bello	6; 3	7; 5	6; 4
5	(Denmark) (Italy)	Torben Ulrich; Giovanni Cucelli	3; 6	6; 2	6; 2	6; 3

=== 1951 ===
1951 Davis Cup Europe Zone Second Round

Italy
3
Milan, Italy
18–21 May 1951
Clay

South Africa
2

			1	2	3	4	5
1	(Italy) (South Africa)	Giovanni Cucelli; Sydney Levy	9; 11	6; 0	6; 4	7; 5
2	(Italy) (South Africa)	Rolando del Bello; Eric Sturgess	3; 6	1; 6	5; 7
3	(Italy) (South Africa)	Marcello del Bello / Giovanni Cucelli; Leon Norgarb / Eric Sturgess	13; 11	6; 4	6; 4
4	(Italy) (South Africa)	Rolando del Bello; Sydney Levy	6; 4	6; 3	6; 2
5	(Italy) (South Africa)	Giovanni Cucelli; Eric Sturgess	3; 6	2; 6	6; 4	7; 9

1951 Davis Cup Europe Zone Quarterfinals

Italy
5
Milan, Italy
17–19 June 1951
Clay

Poland
0

			1	2	3	4	5
1	(Italy) (Poland)	Giovanni Cucelli; Józef Piątek	8; 6	6; 0	6; 2
2	(Italy) (Poland)	Rolando del Bello; Jan Radzio	7; 9	6; 3	7; 5	6; 1
3	(Italy) (Poland)	Marcello del Bello / Giovanni Cucelli; Jan Chytrowski / Józef Piątek	6; 2	6; 3	6; 2
4	(Italy) (Poland)	Rolando del Bello; Józef Piątek	6; 4	6; 0	1; 6	6; 2
5	(Italy) (Poland)	Giuseppe Merlo; Jan Radzio	6; 1	6; 1	6; 2

1951 Davis Cup Europe Zone Semifinals

West Germany
3
Munich, West Germany
13–17 July 1951

Italy
2

			1	2	3	4	5
1	(West Germany) (Italy)	Ernst Buchholz; Rolando del Bello	2; 6	6; 1	8; 6	1; 6	4; 6
2	(West Germany) (Italy)	Gottfried von Cramm; Giovanni Cucelli	6; 2	4; 6	8; 6	7; 5
3	(West Germany) (Italy)	Gottfried von Cramm / Rolf Göpfert; Marcello del Bello / Giovanni Cucelli	6; 4	6; 2	4; 6	9; 7
4	(West Germany) (Italy)	Ernst Buchholz; Giovanni Cucelli	2; 6	3; 6	4; 6
5	(West Germany) (Italy)	Gottfried von Cramm; Rolando del Bello	7; 5	6; 4	4; 6	6; 4

=== 1952 ===
1952 Davis Cup Europe Zone Second Round

Italy
5
Foro Italico, Rome, Italy
16–18 May 1952
Clay

Egypt
0

			1	2	3	4	5
1	(Italy) (Egypt)	Rolando del Bello; Marcel Coen	6; 1	7; 5	6; 1
2	(Italy) (Egypt)	Fausto Gardini; Adli El Shafei	6; 0	6; 3	6; 3
3	(Italy) (Egypt)	Marcello del Bello / Giovanni Cucelli; Marcel Coen / Adli El Shafei	6; 2	6; 3	6; 2
4	(Italy) (Egypt)	Fausto Gardini; Marcel Coen	6; 0	6; 1	6; 1
5	(Italy) (Egypt)	Rolando del Bello; Adli El Shafei	7; 5	7; 5	2; 6	7; 5

1952 Davis Cup Europe Zone Quarterfinals

Italy
4
Bologna, Italy
13–15 June 1952
Clay

Great Britain
1

			1	2	3	4	5
1	(Italy) (United Kingdom)	Rolando del Bello; Tony Mottram	8; 6	6; 2	6; 2
2	(Italy) (United Kingdom)	Fausto Gardini; Geoffrey Paish	6; 2	6; 3	6; 3
3	(Italy) (United Kingdom)	Marcello del Bello / Giovanni Cucelli; Tony Mottram / Geoffrey Paish	3; 6	1; 6	8; 6	2; 6
4	(Italy) (United Kingdom)	Fausto Gardini; Tony Mottram	4; 6	4; 6	6; 3	6; 1	6; 0
5	(Italy) (United Kingdom)	Rolando del Bello; Geoffrey Paish	6; 3	6; 4	6; 2

1952 Davis Cup Europe Zone Semifinals

Italy
4
Milan, Italy
11–13 July 1952
Clay

Denmark
1

			1	2	3	4	5
1	(Italy) (Denmark)	Rolando del Bello; Torben Ulrich	6; 4	6; 4	6; 3
2	(Italy) (Denmark)	Fausto Gardini; Kurt Nielsen	8; 6	6; 4	6; 4
3	(Italy) (Denmark)	Marcello del Bello / Giovanni Cucelli; Kurt Nielsen / Torben Ulrich	8; 6	6; 4	2; 6	4; 6	6; 0
4	(Italy) (Denmark)	Fausto Gardini; Torben Ulrich	6; 0	6; 4	7; 5
5	(Italy) (Denmark)	Rolando del Bello; Kurt Nielsen	3; 6	1; 6	4; 6

1952 Davis Cup Europe Zone Final

Italy
3
Milan, Italy
25–28 July 1952
Clay

Belgium
1

			1	2	3	4	5
1	(Italy) (Belgium)	Rolando del Bello; Jacques Brichant	7; 5	1; 6	5; 7	6; 0	4; 6
2	(Italy) (Belgium)	Fausto Gardini; Philippe Washer	8; 6	6; 1	3; 6	2; 6	6; 4
3	(Italy) (Belgium)	Marcello del Bello / Giovanni Cucelli; Jacques Brichant / Philippe Washer	6; 3	6; 1	5; 7	3; 6	6; 3
4	(Italy) (Belgium)	Fausto Gardini; Jacques Brichant	4; 6	6; 1	0; 6	6; 2	6; 2
5	(Italy) (Belgium)	Rolando del Bello; Philippe Washer	3; 3					not completed

1952 Davis Cup Inter-Zonal Zone Semifinals

Italy
3
Milton Courts, Brisbane, Australia
11–13 December 1952
Grass

India
2

			1	2	3	4	5
1	(Italy) (India)	Fausto Gardini; Naresh Kumar	6; 1	5; 7	7; 5	6; 2
2	(Italy) (India)	Rolando del Bello; Sumant Misra	5; 7	4; 6	1; 6
3	(Italy) (India)	Marcello del Bello / Giovanni Cucelli; Naresh Kumar / Sumant Misra	1; 6	1; 6	6; 2	6; 2	13; 11
4	(Italy) (India)	Fausto Gardini; Sumant Misra	8; 6	8; 6	1; 6	6; 4
5	(Italy) (India)	Rolando del Bello; Naresh Kumar	2; 6	6; 8	6; 4	3; 6

1952 Davis Cup Inter-Zonal Zone Final

United States
5
White City Stadium, Sydney, Australia
18–20 December 1952
Grass

Italy
0

			1	2	3	4	5
1	(United States) (Italy)	Vic Seixas; Fausto Gardini	5; 7	3; 6	6; 3	8; 6	6; 3
2	(United States) (Italy)	Tony Trabert; Giovanni Cucelli	6; 3	6; 1	6; 3
3	(United States) (Italy)	Vic Seixas / Tony Trabert; Marcello del Bello / Giovanni Cucelli	6; 4	6; 3	6; 2
4	(United States) (Italy)	Ham Richardson; Rolando del Bello	7; 5	6; 3	5; 7	6; 3
5	(United States) (Italy)	Tony Trabert; Fausto Gardini	6; 3	5; 7	7; 5	6; 3

=== 1953 ===
1953 Davis Cup Europe Zone Second Round

Netherlands
0
Scheveningen, Netherlands
14–16 May 1953
Clay

Italy
5

			1	2	3	4	5
1	(Netherlands) (Italy)	Hubert Wilton; Giuseppe Merlo	3; 6	2; 6	1; 6
2	(Netherlands) (Italy)	Hans van Swol; Rolando del Bello	4; 6	6; 1	3; 6	6; 3	1; 6
3	(Netherlands) (Italy)	Hans van Swol / Hubert Wilton; Marcello del Bello / Orlando Sirola	2; 6	5; 7	1; 6
4	(Netherlands) (Italy)	Boebi van Meegeren; Rolando del Bello	6; 4	1; 6	2; 6	3; 6
5	(Netherlands) (Italy)	Hans van Swol; Giuseppe Merlo	6; 0	6; 2	5; 7	4; 6	5; 7

1953 Davis Cup Europe Zone Quarterfinals

Italy
4
Turin, Italy
12–14 June 1953
Clay

Sweden
1

			1	2	3	4	5
1	(Italy) (Sweden)	Fausto Gardini; Lennart Bergelin	7; 9	1; 6	6; 2	7; 5	6; 3
2	(Italy) (Sweden)	Giuseppe Merlo; Sven Davidson	4; 6	6; 3	6; 3	7; 5
3	(Italy) (Sweden)	Marcello del Bello / Giovanni Cucelli; Lennart Bergelin / Sven Davidson	6; 2	1; 6	6; 2	6; 3
4	(Italy) (Sweden)	Orlando Sirola; Sven Davidson	3; 6	6; 3	7; 5	3; 6	4; 6
5	(Italy) (Sweden)	Giuseppe Merlo; Staffan Stockenberg	6; 4	6; 0	6; 2

1953 Davis Cup Europe Zone Semifinals

Belgium
3
Brussels, Belgium
10–13 July 1953

Italy
2

			1	2	3	4	5
1	(Belgium) (Italy)	Philippe Washer; Fausto Gardini	6; 4	14; 16	2; 6	6; 4	6; 3
2	(Belgium) (Italy)	Jacques Brichant; Giuseppe Merlo	6; 4	1; 6	6; 4	4; 6	8; 10
3	(Belgium) (Italy)	Jacques Brichant / Philippe Washer; Marcello del Bello / Giovanni Cucelli	3; 6	6; 2	5; 7	1; 6
4	(Belgium) (Italy)	Philippe Washer; Giuseppe Merlo	6; 2	6; 2	6; 4
5	(Belgium) (Italy)	Jacques Brichant; Fausto Gardini	6; 2	7; 5	4; 6	9; 7

=== 1954 ===
1954 Davis Cup Europe Zone Second Round

Spain
0
Real Club de la Puerta de Hierro, Madrid, Spain
15–17 May 1954
Clay

Italy
5

			1	2	3	4	5
1	(Spain) (Italy)	Carlos Ferrer; Orlando Sirola	1; 6	6; 8	5; 7
2	(Spain) (Italy)	Emilio Martínez del Rey; Marcello del Bello	2; 6	5; 7	3; 6
3	(Spain) (Italy)	Jaime Bartroli / Carlos Ferrer; Marcello del Bello / Giovanni Cucelli	3; 6	3; 6	7; 5	4; 6
4	(Spain) (Italy)	Carlos Ferrer; Nicola Pietrangeli	4; 6	3; 6	6; 2	2; 6
5	(Spain) (Italy)	Emilio Martínez del Rey; Orlando Sirola	2; 6	6; 4	4; 6	4; 6

1954 Davis Cup Europe Zone Quarterfinals

Sweden
5
Solna Tennisstadion, Solna, Sweden
10–12 June 1954
Clay

Italy
0

			1	2	3	4	5
1	(Sweden) (Italy)	Sven Davidson; Marcello del Bello	6; 1	6; 2	6; 2
2	(Sweden) (Italy)	Lennart Bergelin; Nicola Pietrangeli	7; 5	6; 1	3; 6	6; 4
3	(Sweden) (Italy)	Lennart Bergelin / Sven Davidson; Marcello del Bello / Giovanni Cucelli	4; 6	7; 5	2; 6	6; 4	6; 3
4	(Sweden) (Italy)	Sven Davidson; Nicola Pietrangeli	6; 4	2; 6	6; 4	6; 1
5	(Sweden) (Italy)	Lennart Bergelin; Orlando Sirola	6; 2	6; 3	2; 6	6; 1

=== 1955 ===
1955 Davis Cup Europe Zone Second Round

West Germany
0
Munich, West Germany
14–17 May

Italy
5

			1	2	3	4	5
1	(West Germany) (Italy)	Christoph Biederlack; Fausto Gardini	2; 6	0; 6	1; 6
2	(West Germany) (Italy)	Rupert Huber; Giuseppe Merlo	2; 6	3; 6	3; 6
3	(West Germany) (Italy)	Ernst Buchholz / Horst Hermann; Nicola Pietrangeli / Orlando Sirola	1; 6	4; 6	6; 2	6; 8
4	(West Germany) (Italy)	Rupert Huber; Fausto Gardini	0; 6	3; 6	3; 6
5	(West Germany) (Italy)	Christoph Biederlack; Giuseppe Merlo	1; 6	6; 8	1; 6

1955 Davis Cup Europe Zone Quarterfinals

Denmark
0
Copenhagen, Denmark
10–12 June
Clay

Italy
5

			1	2	3	4	5
1	(Denmark) (Italy)	Kurt Nielsen; Fausto Gardini	2; 6	3; 6	1; 6
2	(Denmark) (Italy)	Torben Ulrich; Giuseppe Merlo	3; 6	4; 6	6; 3	0; 6
3	(Denmark) (Italy)	Kurt Nielsen / Torben Ulrich; Nicola Pietrangeli / Orlando Sirola	14; 16	3; 6	1; 6
4	(Denmark) (Italy)	Kurt Nielsen; Giuseppe Merlo	0; 6	6; 4	2; 6	6; 4	5; 7
5	(Denmark) (Italy)	Jørgen Ulrich; Nicola Pietrangeli	4; 6	2; 6	3; 6

1955 Davis Cup Europe Zone Semifinals

Great Britain
0
Edgbaston Lawn Tennis Club, Birmingham, England
14–16 July
Grass

Italy
5

			1	2	3	4	5
1	(United Kingdom) (Italy)	Billy Knight; Fausto Gardini	9; 7	2; 6	4; 6	1; 6
2	(United Kingdom) (Italy)	Roger Becker; Nicola Pietrangeli	3; 6	9; 7	4; 6	6; 8
3	(United Kingdom) (Italy)	Mike Davies / Bobby Wilson; Nicola Pietrangeli / Orlando Sirola	6; 4	9; 11	6; 8	3; 6
4	(United Kingdom) (Italy)	Billy Knight; Nicola Pietrangeli	6; 3	6; 4	4; 6	3; 6	4; 6
5	(United Kingdom) (Italy)	Roger Becker; Orlando Sirola	8; 10	2; 6	5; 7

1955 Davis Cup Europe Zone Final

Italy
4
Milan, Italy
29–31 July
Clay

Sweden
1

			1	2	3	4	5
1	(Italy) (Sweden)	Fausto Gardini; Sven Davidson	6; 4	0; 6	3; 6	6; 1	6; 3
2	(Italy) (Sweden)	Giuseppe Merlo; Lennart Bergelin	6; 1	6; 8	6; 8	8; 6	6; 1
3	(Italy) (Sweden)	Nicola Pietrangeli / Orlando Sirola; Sven Davidson / Torsten Johansson	6; 3	6; 4	2; 6	2; 6	6; 1
4	(Italy) (Sweden)	Orlando Sirola; Sven Davidson	2; 6	6; 8	4; 6
5	(Italy) (Sweden)	Fausto Gardini; Staffan Stockenberg	6; 4	6; 1	6; 4

1955 Davis Cup Inter-Zonal Zone Final

Australia
5
Germantown Cricket Club, Philadelphia, PA, United States
14–16 August
Grass

Italy
0

			1	2	3	4	5
1	(Australia) (Italy)	Lew Hoad; Fausto Gardini	6; 3	6; 2	6; 0
2	(Australia) (Italy)	Ken Rosewall; Nicola Pietrangeli	8; 6	3; 6	6; 1	6; 4
3	(Australia) (Italy)	Rex Hartwig / Lew Hoad; Nicola Pietrangeli / Orlando Sirola	7; 5	13; 11	7; 5
4	(Australia) (Italy)	Ken Rosewall; Orlando Sirola	6; 4	4; 6	6; 1	6; 4
5	(Australia) (Italy)	Lew Hoad; Nicola Pietrangeli	9; 7	6; 2	6; 3

=== 1956 ===
1956 Davis Cup Europe Zone Second Round

Poland
0
Warsaw, Poland
12–14 May 1956

Italy
5

			1	2	3	4	5
1	(Poland) (Italy)	Władysław Skonecki; Giuseppe Merlo	0; 6	2; 6	3; 6
2	(Poland) (Italy)	Andrzej Licis; Nicola Pietrangeli	4; 6	4; 6	5; 7
3	(Poland) (Italy)	Józef Piątek / Jan Radzio; Nicola Pietrangeli / Orlando Sirola	3; 6	2; 6	4; 6
4	(Poland) (Italy)	Andrzej Licis; Giuseppe Merlo	3; 6	3; 6	5; 7
5	(Poland) (Italy)	Władysław Skonecki; Nicola Pietrangeli	2; 6	2; 6	1; 6

1956 Davis Cup Europe Zone Quarterfinals

Italy
4
Bologna, Italy
2-4 June 1956
Clay

Denmark
1

			1	2	3	4	5
1	(Italy) (Denmark)	Giuseppe Merlo; Kurt Nielsen	7; 9	6; 1	3; 6	4; 6
2	(Italy) (Denmark)	Nicola Pietrangeli; Torben Ulrich	4; 6	6; 2	6; 1	6; 0
3	(Italy) (Denmark)	Nicola Pietrangeli / Orlando Sirola; Kurt Nielsen / Torben Ulrich	6; 4	6; 2	3; 6	6; 3
4	(Italy) (Denmark)	Giuseppe Merlo; Torben Ulrich	6; 0	6; 4	6; 2
5	(Italy) (Denmark)	Nicola Pietrangeli; Kurt Nielsen	8; 6	6; 4	4; 6	2; 6	6; 4

1956 Davis Cup Europe Zone Semifinals

France
2
Stade Roland Garros, Paris, France
15–17 July 1956
Clay

Italy
3

			1	2	3	4	5
1	(France) (Italy)	Pierre Darmon; Nicola Pietrangeli	3; 6	6; 3	6; 3	2; 6	6; 3
2	(France) (Italy)	Paul Rémy; Giuseppe Merlo	7; 5	6; 8	6; 2	6; 2
3	(France) (Italy)	Marcel Bernard / Paul Rémy; Nicola Pietrangeli / Orlando Sirola	2; 6	2; 6	6; 2	1; 6
4	(France) (Italy)	Pierre Darmon; Giuseppe Merlo	3; 6	6; 4	7; 9	4; 6
5	(France) (Italy)	Paul Rémy; Nicola Pietrangeli	3; 6	6; 8	2; 6

1956 Davis Cup Europe Zone Final

Sweden
0
Båstad Tennis Stadium, Båstad, Sweden
20–22 July 1956
Clay

Italy
5

			1	2	3	4	5
1	(Sweden) (Italy)	Sven Davidson; Nicola Pietrangeli	4; 6	6; 3	1; 6	4; 6
2	(Sweden) (Italy)	Ulf Schmidt; Giuseppe Merlo	7; 5	2; 6	5; 7	1; 6
3	(Sweden) (Italy)	Sven Davidson / Torsten Johansson; Nicola Pietrangeli / Orlando Sirola	4; 6	7; 5	2; 6	3; 6
4	(Sweden) (Italy)	Torsten Johansson; Orlando Sirola	4; 6	6; 1	2; 6	1; 6
5	(Sweden) (Italy)	Ulf Schmidt; Nicola Pietrangeli	5; 7	3; 6	6; 1	3; 6

1956 Davis Cup Inter-Zonal Zone Semifinals

United States
4
West Side Tennis Club, Forest Hills, NY, United States
29 September–1 October 1956
Grass

Italy
1

			1	2	3	4	5
1	(United States) (Italy)	Ham Richardson; Nicola Pietrangeli	6; 3	6; 2	6; 3
2	(United States) (Italy)	Vic Seixas; Orlando Sirola	6; 3	11; 9	6; 4
3	(United States) (Italy)	Ham Richardson / Vic Seixas; Nicola Pietrangeli / Orlando Sirola	1; 6	6; 3	6; 4	6; 2
4	(United States) (Italy)	Michael Green; Nicola Pietrangeli	6; 3	4; 6	3; 6	4; 6
5	(United States) (Italy)	Sam Giammalva; Orlando Sirola	12; 10	6; 3	6; 2

=== 1957 ===
1957 Davis Cup Europe Zone Second Round

Netherlands
0
Scheveningen, Netherlands
18–20 May 1957
Clay

Italy
5

			1	2	3	4	5
1	(Netherlands) (Italy)	Fred Dehnert; Giuseppe Merlo	2; 6	1; 6	1; 6
2	(Netherlands) (Italy)	Hans van Dalsum; Nicola Pietrangeli	1; 6	1; 6	1; 6
3	(Netherlands) (Italy)	Hans van Dalsum / Fred Dehnert; Nicola Pietrangeli / Orlando Sirola	8; 6	2; 6	8; 10	3; 6
4	(Netherlands) (Italy)	Hans van Dalsum; Giuseppe Merlo	8; 6	2; 6	8; 10	3; 6
5	(Netherlands) (Italy)	Fred Dehnert; Orlando Sirola	4; 6	4; 6	7; 9

1957 Davis Cup Europe Zone Quarterfinals

Italy
4
Palermo, Italy
7–9 June 1957
Clay

Poland
1

			1	2	3	4	5
1	(Italy) (Poland)	Giuseppe Merlo; Andrzej Licis	6; 1	6; 4	6; 0
2	(Italy) (Poland)	Nicola Pietrangeli; Władysław Skonecki	7; 5	4; 6	7; 5	6; 1
3	(Italy) (Poland)	Nicola Pietrangeli / Orlando Sirola; Józef Piątek / Władysław Skonecki	6; 2	9; 7	6; 2
4	(Italy) (Poland)	Antonio Maggi; Władysław Skonecki	6; 4	6; 0	6; 4
5	(Italy) (Poland)	Orlando Sirola; Andrzej Licis	4; 6	7; 9	0; 6

1957 Davis Cup Europe Zone Semifinals

Italy
3
Milan Tennis Club, Milan, Italy
19–21 July 1957
Clay

Sweden
1

			1	2	3	4	5
1	(Italy) (Sweden)	Giuseppe Merlo; Ulf Schmidt	6; 0	6; 0	6; 3
2	(Italy) (Sweden)	Nicola Pietrangeli; Sven Davidson	6; 4	0; 6	1; 6	1; 6
3	(Italy) (Sweden)	Nicola Pietrangeli / Orlando Sirola; Sven Davidson / Ulf Schmidt	6; 4	6; 4	6; 4
4	(Italy) (Sweden)	Nicola Pietrangeli; Ulf Schmidt	7; 9	8; 6	6; 2	6; 2
5	(Italy) (Sweden)	Giuseppe Merlo; Sven Davidson						not played

1957 Davis Cup Europe Zone Final

Belgium
3
Brussels, Belgium
2–5 August 1957

Italy
2

			1	2	3	4	5
1	(Belgium) (Italy)	Jacques Brichant; Nicola Pietrangeli	4; 6	4; 6	3; 6
2	(Belgium) (Italy)	Philippe Washer; Giuseppe Merlo	6; 2	8; 6	6; 2
3	(Belgium) (Italy)	Jacques Brichant / Philippe Washer; Nicola Pietrangeli / Orlando Sirola	3; 6	2; 6	5; 7
4	(Belgium) (Italy)	Jacques Brichant; Giuseppe Merlo	6; 8	7; 5	6; 8	7; 5	6; 1
5	(Belgium) (Italy)	Philippe Washer; Nicola Pietrangeli	6; 4	3; 6	6; 8	7; 5	6; 2

=== 1958 ===
1958 Davis Cup Europe Zone Second Round

Italy
3
Florence, Italy
15–18 May 1958
Clay

India
2

			1	2	3	4	5
1	(Italy) (India)	Nicola Pietrangeli; Naresh Kumar	8; 6	8; 6	10; 8
2	(Italy) (India)	Orlando Sirola; Ramanathan Krishnan	2; 6	7; 5	6; 3	6; 3
3	(Italy) (India)	Nicola Pietrangeli / Orlando Sirola; Ramanathan Krishnan / Naresh Kumar	1; 6	9; 7	4; 6	6; 2	6; 3
4	(Italy) (India)	Orlando Sirola; Naresh Kumar	7; 5	5; 7	6; 3	4; 6	4; 6
5	(Italy) (India)	Antonio Maggi; Ramanathan Krishnan	0; 6	6; 2	4; 6	2; 6

1958 Davis Cup Europe Zone Quarterfinals

Denmark
0
Copenhagen, Denmark
5–7 June 1958
Clay

Italy
5

			1	2	3	4	5
1	(Denmark) (Italy)	Kurt Nielsen; Orlando Sirola	2; 6	6; 4	5; 7	14; 12	5; 7
2	(Denmark) (Italy)	Torben Ulrich; Nicola Pietrangeli	2; 6	3; 6	1; 6
3	(Denmark) (Italy)	Kurt Nielsen / Torben Ulrich; Nicola Pietrangeli / Orlando Sirola	2; 6	6; 2	3; 6	2; 6
4	(Denmark) (Italy)	Torben Ulrich; Orlando Sirola	8; 6	3; 6	4; 6	6; 3	3; 6
5	(Denmark) (Italy)	Kurt Nielsen; Nicola Pietrangeli	1; 6	6; 3	4; 6	4; 6

1958 Davis Cup Europe Zone Semifinals

Poland
1
Warsaw, Poland
18–20 July 1958

Italy
4

			1	2	3	4	5
1	(Poland) (Italy)	Władysław Skonecki; Nicola Pietrangeli	3; 6	2; 6	6; 4	1; 6
2	(Poland) (Italy)	Andrzej Licis; Orlando Sirola	4; 6	6; 3	4; 6	3; 6
3	(Poland) (Italy)	Józef Piątek / Jan Radzio; Nicola Pietrangeli / Orlando Sirola	3; 6	1; 6	1; 6
4	(Poland) (Italy)	Andrzej Licis; Nicola Pietrangeli	6; 4	6; 2	6; 1
5	(Poland) (Italy)	Władysław Skonecki; Orlando Sirola	6; 1	6; 3	0; 6	2; 6	2; 6

1958 Davis Cup Europe Zone Final

Italy
4
Milan, Italy
1–3 August 1958
Clay

Great Britain
1

			1	2	3	4	5
1	(Italy) (United Kingdom)	Nicola Pietrangeli; Mike Davies	4; 6	3; 6	1; 6
2	(Italy) (United Kingdom)	Orlando Sirola; Billy Knight	6; 3	7; 5	6; 3
3	(Italy) (United Kingdom)	Nicola Pietrangeli / Orlando Sirola; Mike Davies / Billy Knight	6; 3	5; 7	6; 4	4; 6	9; 7
4	(Italy) (United Kingdom)	Nicola Pietrangeli; Billy Knight	4; 6	6; 3	6; 4	6; 1
5	(Italy) (United Kingdom)	Orlando Sirola; Mike Davies	6; 3	6; 2	6; 2

1958 Davis Cup Inter-Zonal Zone Semifinals

Philippines
0
Sydney, Australia
6–8 December 1958
Grass

Italy
5

			1	2	3	4	5
1	(Philippines) (Italy)	Raymundo Deyro; Orlando Sirola	6; 8	3; 6	4; 6
2	(Philippines) (Italy)	Felicisimo Ampon; Nicola Pietrangeli	2; 6	2; 6	5; 7
3	(Philippines) (Italy)	Miguel Dungo / Juan-Johnson José; Nicola Pietrangeli / Orlando Sirola	3; 6	3; 6	5; 7
4	(Philippines) (Italy)	Miguel Dungo; Nicola Pietrangeli	2; 6	2; 6	2; 6
5	(Philippines) (Italy)	Juan-Johnson Jose; Giuseppe Merlo	2; 6	5; 7	1; 6

1958 Davis Cup Inter-Zonal Zone Final

United States
5
Royal King's Park Tennis Club, Perth, Australia
19–21 December 1958
Grass

Italy
0

			1	2	3	4	5
1	(United States) (Italy)	Alex Olmedo; Nicola Pietrangeli	5; 7	10; 8	6; 0	6; 1
2	(United States) (Italy)	Ham Richardson; Orlando Sirola	6; 4	6; 2	7; 5
3	(United States) (Italy)	Alex Olmedo / Ham Richardson; Nicola Pietrangeli / Orlando Sirola	7; 9	6; 4	13; 11	7; 5
4	(United States) (Italy)	Barry MacKay; Nicola Pietrangeli	6; 4	3; 6	5; 7	8; 6	8; 6
5	(United States) (Italy)	Alex Olmedo; Orlando Sirola	20; 18	6; 1	6; 4

=== 1959 ===
1959 Davis Cup Europe Zone Second Round

Belgium
1
Brussels, Belgium
16–18 May 1959

Italy
4

			1	2	3	4	5
1	(Belgium) (Italy)	Jacques Brichant; Nicola Pietrangeli	4; 6	8; 6	6; 1	1; 6	2; 6
2	(Belgium) (Italy)	Jean-Pierre Froment; Orlando Sirola	2; 6	2; 6	3; 6
3	(Belgium) (Italy)	Jacques Brichant / Philippe Washer; Nicola Pietrangeli / Orlando Sirola	2; 6	3; 6	4; 6
4	(Belgium) (Italy)	Jean-Pierre Froment; Sergio Tacchini	3; 6	6; 0	4; 6	6; 8
5	(Belgium) (Italy)	Jacques Brichant; Orlando Sirola	5; 7	6; 3	7; 5	10; 12	7; 5

1959 Davis Cup Europe Zone Quarterfinals

Italy
4
Florence, Italy
12–14 June 1959
Clay

South Africa
1

			1	2	3	4	5
1	(Italy) (South Africa)	Orlando Sirola; Ian Vermaak	6; 4	6; 3	6; 4
2	(Italy) (South Africa)	Nicola Pietrangeli; Gordon Forbes	7; 5	6; 2	6; 4
3	(Italy) (South Africa)	Nicola Pietrangeli / Orlando Sirola; Gordon Forbes / Abe Segal	6; 4	6; 3	14; 12
4	(Italy) (South Africa)	Orlando Sirola; Abe Segal	3; 6	8; 10	6; 4	4; 6
5	(Italy) (South Africa)	Giuseppe Merlo; Ian Vermaak	6; 4	6; 2	6; 4

1959 Davis Cup Europe Zone Semifinals

Italy
4
Sanremo, Italy
10–12 July 1959
Clay

France
1

			1	2	3	4	5
1	(Italy) (France)	Nicola Pietrangeli; Robert Haillet	6; 4	6; 2	6; 1
2	(Italy) (France)	Orlando Sirola; Pierre Darmon	6; 1	6; 1	3; 6	8; 6
3	(Italy) (France)	Nicola Pietrangeli / Orlando Sirola; Pierre Darmon / Jean-Noël Grinda	6; 3	6; 2	7; 5
4	(Italy) (France)	Giuseppe Merlo; Gérard Pilet	1; 6	6; 4	3; 6	4; 6
5	(Italy) (France)	Nicola Pietrangeli; Pierre Darmon	3; 6	6; 4	9; 7	6; 1

1959 Davis Cup Europe Zone Final

Italy
4
Milan Tennis Club, Milan, Italy
24–27 July 1959
Clay

Spain
1

			1	2	3	4	5
1	(Italy) (Spain)	Orlando Sirola; Juan Manuel Couder	2	8; 6	7; 6	2; 5	6; 6
2	(Italy) (Spain)	Nicola Pietrangeli; Andrés Gimeno	8; 6	6; 3	6; 3
3	(Italy) (Spain)	Nicola Pietrangeli / Orlando Sirola; Juan Manuel Couder / Andrés Gimeno	6; 4	8; 6	6; 4
4	(Italy) (Spain)	Sergio Tacchini; Andrés Gimeno	4; 6	1; 6	1; 6
5	(Italy) (Spain)	Nicola Pietrangeli; Juan Manuel Couder	6; 8	4; 6	6; 2	6; 0	6; 4

1959 Davis Cup Inter-Zonal Zone Semifinals

Australia
4
Germantown Cricket Club, Philadelphia, PA, United States
7–10 August 1959
Grass

Italy
1

			1	2	3	4	5
1	(Australia) (Italy)	Rod Laver; Nicola Pietrangeli	6; 4	2; 6	6; 3	6; 3
2	(Australia) (Italy)	Neale Fraser; Orlando Sirola	19; 17	1; 6	6; 3	6; 4
3	(Australia) (Italy)	Roy Emerson / Neale Fraser; Nicola Pietrangeli / Orlando Sirola	3; 6	11; 9	6; 3	9; 7
4	(Australia) (Italy)	Rod Laver; Orlando Sirola	4; 6	6; 4	6; 0	6; 3
5	(Australia) (Italy)	Roy Emerson; Nicola Pietrangeli	4; 6	0; 6	4; 6

== 1960s ==
=== 1960 ===
1960 Davis Cup Europe Zone Second Round

Hungary
2
Budapest, Hungary
13–15 May 1960

Italy
3

			1	2	3	4	5
1	(Hungary) (Italy)	András Ádám-Stolpa; Orlando Sirola	6; 2	2; 6	6; 8	6; 2	6; 1
2	(Hungary) (Italy)	István Gulyás; Nicola Pietrangeli	6; 1	2; 6	4; 6	4; 6
3	(Hungary) (Italy)	István Gulyás / András Szikszay; Nicola Pietrangeli / Orlando Sirola	6; 1	3; 6	3; 6	3; 6
4	(Hungary) (Italy)	András Ádám-Stolpa; Nicola Pietrangeli	2; 6	6; 3	2; 6	4; 6
5	(Hungary) (Italy)	István Gulyás; Sergio Tacchini	6; 3	6; 2	4; 6	5; 7	6; 3

1960 Davis Cup Europe Zone Quarterfinals

Italy
3
Turin, Italy
10–12 June 1960
Clay

Chile
2

			1	2	3	4	5
1	(Italy) (Chile)	Orlando Sirola; Luis Ayala	4; 6	6; 3	3; 6	2; 6
2	(Italy) (Chile)	Nicola Pietrangeli; Patricio Rodríguez	6; 1	6; 4	6; 1
3	(Italy) (Chile)	Nicola Pietrangeli / Orlando Sirola; Ernesto Aguirre / Luis Ayala	6; 1	6; 3	8; 6
4	(Italy) (Chile)	Nicola Pietrangeli; Luis Ayala	4; 6	1; 6	1; 6
5	(Italy) (Chile)	Orlando Sirola; Patricio Rodríguez	6; 0	7; 5	6; 3

1960 Davis Cup Europe Zone Semifinals

Great Britain
1
No. 1 Court, All England Club, Wimbledon, England
15–17 July 1960
Grass

Italy
4

			1	2	3	4	5
1	(United Kingdom) (Italy)	Bobby Wilson; Nicola Pietrangeli	4; 6	3; 6	6; 4	5; 7
2	(United Kingdom) (Italy)	Mike Davies; Orlando Sirola	7; 9	5; 7	6; 1	6; 2	4; 6
3	(United Kingdom) (Italy)	Mike Davies / Bobby Wilson; Nicola Pietrangeli / Orlando Sirola	4; 6	6; 3	6; 8	3; 6
4	(United Kingdom) (Italy)	Bobby Wilson; Sergio Tacchini	3; 6	6; 3	8; 6	6; 2
5	(United Kingdom) (Italy)	Mike Davies; Nicola Pietrangeli	4; 6	3; 6	4; 6

1960 Davis Cup Europe Zone Final

Sweden
2
Båstad Tennis Stadium, Båstad, Sweden
29–31 July 1960
Clay

Italy
3

			1	2	3	4	5
1	(Sweden) (Italy)	Jan-Erik Lundqvist; Orlando Sirola	6; 4	4; 6	6; 3	6; 3
2	(Sweden) (Italy)	Ulf Schmidt; Nicola Pietrangeli	1; 6	4; 6	6; 4	4; 6
3	(Sweden) (Italy)	Jan-Erik Lundqvist / Ulf Schmidt; Nicola Pietrangeli / Orlando Sirola	16; 14	7; 5	2; 6	3; 6	2; 6
4	(Sweden) (Italy)	Ulf Schmidt; Orlando Sirola	4; 6	2; 6	1; 6
5	(Sweden) (Italy)	Jan-Erik Lundqvist; Sergio Tacchini	6; 2	6; 1	6; 1

1960 Davis Cup Inter-Zonal Zone Final

Italy
3
Royal King's Park, Perth, Australia
9–12 December 1960
Grass

United States
2

			1	2	3	4	5
1	(Italy) (United States)	Orlando Sirola; Butch Buchholz	8; 6	5; 7	9; 11	2; 6
2	(Italy) (United States)	Nicola Pietrangeli; Barry MacKay	6; 8	6; 3	10; 8	6; 8	11; 13
3	(Italy) (United States)	Nicola Pietrangeli / Orlando Sirola; Butch Buchholz / Chuck McKinley	3; 6	10; 8	6; 4	13; 11
4	(Italy) (United States)	Nicola Pietrangeli; Butch Buchholz	6; 1	6; 2	6; 8	3; 6	6; 4
5	(Italy) (United States)	Orlando Sirola; Barry MacKay	9; 7	6; 3	8; 6

1960 Davis Cup Challenge Round

Australia
4
White City Stadium, Sydney, Australia
26–28 December 1960
Grass

Italy
1

			1	2	3	4	5
1	(Australia) (Italy)	Neale Fraser; Orlando Sirola	4; 6	6; 3	6; 3	6; 3
2	(Australia) (Italy)	Rod Laver; Nicola Pietrangeli	8; 6	6; 4	6; 3
3	(Australia) (Italy)	Roy Emerson / Neale Fraser; Nicola Pietrangeli / Orlando Sirola	10; 8	5; 7	6; 2	6; 4
4	(Australia) (Italy)	Rod Laver; Orlando Sirola	9; 7	6; 2	6; 3
5	(Australia) (Italy)	Neale Fraser; Nicola Pietrangeli	9; 11	3; 6	6; 1	2; 6

=== 1961 ===
1961 Davis Cup Europe Zone Second round

Belgium
2
Brussels, Belgium
2–4 June 1961
Clay

Italy
3

			1	2	3	4	5
1	(Belgium) (Italy)	Jacques Brichant; Nicola Pietrangeli	2; 6	2; 6	6; 0	6; 1	6; 1
2	(Belgium) (Italy)	Eric Drossart; Orlando Sirola	6; 2	4; 6	5; 7	2; 6
3	(Belgium) (Italy)	Jacques Brichant / Jean-Claude Van der Borght; Nicola Pietrangeli / Orlando Sirola	5; 7	4; 6	3; 6
4	(Belgium) (Italy)	Eric Drossart; Nicola Pietrangeli	3; 6	2; 6	5; 7
5	(Belgium) (Italy)	Jacques Brichant; Orlando Sirola	6; 1	7; 5	6; 0

1961 Davis Cup Europe Zone Quarterfinals

West Germany
2
Munich, West Germany
16–19 June 1961
Clay

Italy
3

			1	2	3	4	5
1	(West Germany) (Italy)	Christian Kuhnke; Nicola Pietrangeli	1; 6	6; 3	4; 6	6; 2	1; 6
2	(West Germany) (Italy)	Wilhelm Bungert; Orlando Sirola	6; 4	6; 3	7; 5
3	(West Germany) (Italy)	Wilhelm Bungert / Christian Kuhnke; Nicola Pietrangeli / Orlando Sirola	6; 2	5; 7	6; 3	2; 6	1; 6
4	(West Germany) (Italy)	Christian Kuhnke; Orlando Sirola	9; 7	6; 3	3; 6	11; 9
5	(West Germany) (Italy)	Wilhelm Bungert; Nicola Pietrangeli	5; 7	11; 9	0; 6	6; 3	4; 6

1961 Davis Cup Europe Zone Semifinals

France
1
Stade Roland Garros, Paris, France
21–23 July 1961
Clay

Italy
4

			1	2	3	4	5
1	(France) (Italy)	Pierre Darmon; Nicola Pietrangeli	7; 5	0; 6	4; 6	6; 3	2; 6
2	(France) (Italy)	Gérard Pilet; Fausto Gardini	6; 2	3; 6	2; 6	3; 6
3	(France) (Italy)	Pierre Darmon / Jean-Noël Grinda; Nicola Pietrangeli / Orlando Sirola	6; 4	3; 6	4; 6	5; 7
4	(France) (Italy)	Jacques Renavand; Giuseppe Merlo	6; 3	0; 6	4; 6	7; 5	6; 3
5	(France) (Italy)	Jean-Noël Grinda; Fausto Gardini	8; 10	2; 6	5; 7

1961 Davis Cup Europe Zone Final

Italy
4
Milan, Italy
4–6 August 1961
Clay

Sweden
1

			1	2	3	4	5
1	(Italy) (Sweden)	Fausto Gardini; Ulf Schmidt	6; 4	4; 6	1; 6	6; 3	6; 1
2	(Italy) (Sweden)	Nicola Pietrangeli; Jan-Erik Lundqvist	2; 6	5; 7	6; 1	4; 6
3	(Italy) (Sweden)	Nicola Pietrangeli / Orlando Sirola; Thomas Hallberg / Jan-Erik Lundqvist	6; 3	3; 6	6; 3	6; 1
4	(Italy) (Sweden)	Nicola Pietrangeli; Ulf Schmidt	6; 3	6; 2	3; 6	6; 3
5	(Italy) (Sweden)	Fausto Gardini; Thomas Hallberg	6; 2	6; 1	6; 0

1961 Davis Cup Inter-Zonal Zone Final

Italy
4
Foro Italico, Rome, Italy
13–16 October 1961
Clay

United States
1

			1	2	3	4	5
1	(Italy) (United States)	Fausto Gardini; Jon Douglas	6; 4	6; 4	5; 7	8; 10	0; 6
2	(Italy) (United States)	Nicola Pietrangeli; Whitney Reed	2; 6	6; 8	6; 4	6; 4	6; 4
3	(Italy) (United States)	Nicola Pietrangeli / Orlando Sirola; Donald Dell / Whitney Reed	6; 4	3; 6	6; 3	6; 2
4	(Italy) (United States)	Nicola Pietrangeli; Jon Douglas	9; 7	6; 3	6; 2
5	(Italy) (United States)	Fausto Gardini; Whitney Reed	3; 6	7; 5	3; 6	8; 6	6; 4

1961 Davis Cup Challenge Round

Australia
5
Kooyong Stadium, Melbourne, Australia
26–28 December 1961
Grass

Italy
0

			1	2	3	4	5
1	(Australia) (Italy)	Roy Emerson; Nicola Pietrangeli	8; 6	6; 4	6; 0
2	(Australia) (Italy)	Rod Laver; Orlando Sirola	6; 1	6; 4	6; 3
3	(Australia) (Italy)	Roy Emerson / Neale Fraser; Nicola Pietrangeli / Orlando Sirola	6; 2	6; 3	6; 4
4	(Australia) (Italy)	Rod Laver; Nicola Pietrangeli	6; 3	3; 6	4; 6	6; 3	8; 6
5	(Australia) (Italy)	Roy Emerson; Orlando Sirola	6; 3	6; 3	4; 6	6; 2

=== 1962 ===
1962 Davis Cup Europe Zone Second round

Italy
5
Florence, Italy
18–20 May 1962
Clay

Soviet Union
0

			1	2	3	4	5
1	(Italy) (Soviet Union)	Nicola Pietrangeli; Toomas Leius	6; 4	1; 6	6; 3	6; 1
2	(Italy) (Soviet Union)	Fausto Gardini; Sergei Likhachev	6; 0	6; 2	6; 3
3	(Italy) (Soviet Union)	Nicola Pietrangeli / Orlando Sirola; Toomas Leius / Sergei Likhachev	7; 5	6; 2	6; 3
4	(Italy) (Soviet Union)	Nicola Pietrangeli; Sergei Likhachev	0; 6	8; 6	8; 6	6; 1
5	(Italy) (Soviet Union)	Fausto Gardini; Toomas Leius	6; 4	2; 6	6; 3	6; 3

1962 Davis Cup Europe Zone Quarterfinals

Italy
4
Brescia, Italy
15–17 June 1962
Clay

Hungary
1

			1	2	3	4	5
1	(Italy) (Hungary)	Fausto Gardini; Zoltán Katona	6; 1	6; 3	6; 1
2	(Italy) (Hungary)	Nicola Pietrangeli; István Gulyás	6; 1	4; 6	3; 6	2; 6
3	(Italy) (Hungary)	Nicola Pietrangeli / Orlando Sirola; István Gulyás / András Szikszay	1; 6	6; 2	6; 1	4; 6	6; 3
4	(Italy) (Hungary)	Nicola Pietrangeli; Zoltán Katona	6; 0	6; 2	6; 3
5	(Italy) (Hungary)	Fausto Gardini; István Gulyás	6; 1	2; 6	6; 3	6; 2

1962 Davis Cup Europe Zone Semifinals

Italy
5
Milan, Italy
13–15 July 1962
Clay

Great Britain
0

			1	2	3	4	5
1	(Italy) (United Kingdom)	Nicola Pietrangeli; Mike Sangster	6; 3	4; 6	7; 5	8; 6
2	(Italy) (United Kingdom)	Fausto Gardini; Billy Knight	6; 1	6; 8	6; 3	6; 1
3	(Italy) (United Kingdom)	Nicola Pietrangeli / Orlando Sirola; Billy Knight / Tony Pickard	6; 3	6; 4	6; 8	6; 3
4	(Italy) (United Kingdom)	Nicola Pietrangeli; Tony Pickard	8; 6	6; 0	6; 1
5	(Italy) (United Kingdom)	Fausto Gardini; Mike Sangster	6; 1	6; 3	6; 0

1962 Davis Cup Europe Zone Final

Sweden
4
Båstad Tennis Stadium, Båstad, Sweden
27–29 July 1962
Clay

Italy
1

			1	2	3	4	5
1	(Sweden) (Italy)	Ulf Schmidt; Fausto Gardini	3; 6	6; 3	5; 7	3; 6
2	(Sweden) (Italy)	Jan-Erik Lundqvist; Nicola Pietrangeli	6; 2	6; 4	6; 1
3	(Sweden) (Italy)	Jan-Erik Lundqvist / Ulf Schmidt; Nicola Pietrangeli / Orlando Sirola	6; 1	3; 6	6; 8	6; 4	9; 7
4	(Sweden) (Italy)	Jan-Erik Lundqvist; Fausto Gardini	6; 0	6; 2	6; 1
5	(Sweden) (Italy)	Ulf Schmidt; Nicola Pietrangeli	6; 1	8; 6	6; 3

=== 1963 ===
1963 Davis Cup Europe Zone Second round

Spain
4
Real Club de Tenis, Barcelona, Spain
31 May–4 June 1963
Clay

Italy
1

			1	2	3	4	5
1	(Spain) (Italy)	Manuel Santana; Nicola Pietrangeli	4; 6	4; 6	6; 3	6; 8
2	(Spain) (Italy)	Juan Manuel Couder; Fausto Gardini	9; 7	7; 5	6; 1
3	(Spain) (Italy)	José Luis Arilla / Manuel Santana; Nicola Pietrangeli / Orlando Sirola	7; 5	6; 4	6; 1
4	(Spain) (Italy)	Manuel Santana; Fausto Gardini	6; 1	6; 1	10; 8
5	(Spain) (Italy)	Juan Manuel Couder; Nicola Pietrangeli	3; 6	6; 3	6; 3	6; 3

=== 1964 ===
1964 Davis Cup Europe Zone First round

Italy
4
Bari, Italy
1–3 May 1964
Clay

Egypt
1

			1	2	3	4	5
1	(Italy) (Egypt)	Sergio Tacchini; Fathi Mohammed-Ali	6; 2	6; 2	6; 1
2	(Italy) (Egypt)	Nicola Pietrangeli; Mabrouk Mohammed-Ali	6; 4	7; 5	6; 2
3	(Italy) (Egypt)	Nicola Pietrangeli / Sergio Tacchini; Fathi Mohammed-Ali / Mabrouk Mohammed-Ali	6; 2	6; 3	6; 2
4	(Italy) (Egypt)	Sergio Tacchini; Mabrouk Mohammed-Ali	7; 5	4; 6	4; 6	6; 3	3; 6
5	(Italy) (Egypt)	Giordano Maioli; Fathi Mohammed-Ali	6; 2	6; 3	6; 2

1964 Davis Cup Europe Zone Second round

Italy
5
Genoa, Italy
15–17 May 1964
Clay

Rhodesia
0

			1	2	3	4	5
1	(Italy) (Rhodesia)	Giuseppe Merlo; Frank Saloman	6; 2	0; 6	7; 5	4; 6	7; 5
2	(Italy) (Rhodesia)	Nicola Pietrangeli; Adrian Bey	6; 2	6; 2	6; 1
3	(Italy) (Rhodesia)	Giordano Maioli / Nicola Pietrangeli; Adrian Bey / Frank Saloman	4; 6	9; 7	6; 2	3; 6	7; 5
4	(Italy) (Rhodesia)	Nicola Pietrangeli; Frank Saloman	6; 2	6; 1	6; 3
5	(Italy) (Rhodesia)	Giuseppe Merlo; Adrian Bey	6; 2	6; 3	6; 2

1964 Davis Cup Europe Zone Quarterfinals

Italy
1
Turin, Italy
12–14 June 1964
Clay

Sweden
3

			1	2	3	4	5
1	(Italy) (Sweden)	Sergio Tacchini; Jan-Erik Lundqvist	3; 6	1; 6	3; 6
2	(Italy) (Sweden)	Nicola Pietrangeli; Ulf Schmidt	6; 3	6; 4	6; 1
3	(Italy) (Sweden)	Giordano Maioli / Nicola Pietrangeli; Jan-Erik Lundqvist / Ulf Schmidt	4; 6	5; 7	8; 10
4	(Italy) (Sweden)	Sergio Tacchini; Ulf Schmidt	2; 6	2; 6	6; 3	3; 6
5	(Italy) (Sweden)	Nicola Pietrangeli; Jan-Erik Lundqvist						not played

=== 1965 ===
1965 Davis Cup Europe Zone First round

Italy
5
Pescara, Italy
30 April–2 May 1965
Clay

Portugal
0

			1	2	3	4	5
1	(Italy) (Portugal)	Giordano Maioli; João Roquette	6; 0	6; 3	6; 0
2	(Italy) (Portugal)	Nicola Pietrangeli; Alfredo Vaz Pinto	6; 3	6; 2	6; 1
3	(Italy) (Portugal)	Giordano Maioli / Nicola Pietrangeli; João Lagos / Alfredo Vaz Pinto	6; 2	6; 3	6; 2
4	(Italy) (Portugal)	Nicola Pietrangeli; João Roquette	6; 1	6; 0	6; 0
5	(Italy) (Portugal)	Giordano Maioli; Alfredo Vaz Pinto	6; 2	6; 3	6; 2

1965 Davis Cup Europe Zone Second round

Italy
3
Milan, Italy
14–16 May 1965
Clay

Brazil
2

			1	2	3	4	5
1	(Italy) (Brazil)	Nicola Pietrangeli; Ronald Barnes	6; 4	9; 7	6; 3
2	(Italy) (Brazil)	Giuseppe Merlo; Thomaz Koch	6; 4	6; 2	6; 4
3	(Italy) (Brazil)	Giordano Maioli / Nicola Pietrangeli; Ronald Barnes / José Edison Mandarino	2; 6	4; 6	5; 7
4	(Italy) (Brazil)	Nicola Pietrangeli; Thomaz Koch	7; 5	6; 3	6; 2
5	(Italy) (Brazil)	Giuseppe Merlo; Ronald Barnes	4; 6	7; 9	6; 2	3; 6

1965 Davis Cup Europe Zone Quarterfinals

Czechoslovakia
3
Prague, Czechoslovakia
11–13 June 1965
Clay

Italy
2

			1	2	3	4	5
1	(Czechoslovakia) (Italy)	Milan Holeček; Giuseppe Merlo	6; 4	5; 7	8; 6	6; 1
2	(Czechoslovakia) (Italy)	Jiří Javorský; Nicola Pietrangeli	3; 6	4; 6	6; 2	4; 6
3	(Czechoslovakia) (Italy)	Milan Holeček / Jiří Javorský; Nicola Pietrangeli / Sergio Tacchini	2; 6	6; 4	7; 5	6; 4
4	(Czechoslovakia) (Italy)	Jiří Javorský; Giuseppe Merlo	1; 6	6; 4	8; 6	6; 3
5	(Czechoslovakia) (Italy)	Milan Holeček; Nicola Pietrangeli	2; 6	2; 6	2; 6

=== 1966 ===
1966 Davis Cup Europe Zone B First round

Italy
4
Bologna, Italy
28–30 April 1966
Clay

Soviet Union
1

			1	2	3	4	5
1	(Italy) (Soviet Union)	Nicola Pietrangeli; Toomas Leius	6; 1	6; 3	6; 1
2	(Italy) (Soviet Union)	Sergio Tacchini; Alexander Ivanov	5; 7	6; 4	6; 4	6; 2
3	(Italy) (Soviet Union)	Giordano Maioli / Gaetano Di Maso; Toomas Leius / Sergei Likhachev	5; 7	0; 6	3; 6
4	(Italy) (Soviet Union)	Sergio Tacchini; Toomas Leius	6; 1	6; 3	6; 2
5	(Italy) (Soviet Union)	Nicola Pietrangeli; Alexander Ivanov	6; 3	6; 1	6; 4

1966 Davis Cup Europe Zone B Quarterfinals

Italy
2
Foro Italico, Rome, Italy
10–12 June 1966
Clay

South Africa
3

			1	2	3	4	5
1	(Italy) (South Africa)	Sergio Tacchini; Cliff Drysdale	1; 6	6; 1	6; 4	6; 4
2	(Italy) (South Africa)	Nicola Pietrangeli; Keith Diepraam	6; 2	6; 3	1; 6	6; 3
3	(Italy) (South Africa)	Giordano Maioli / Gaetano Di Maso; Keith Diepraam / Frew McMillan	6; 3	11; 9	3; 6	4; 6	4; 6
4	(Italy) (South Africa)	Nicola Pietrangeli; Cliff Drysdale	3; 6	3; 6	6; 4	6; 2	2; 6
5	(Italy) (South Africa)	Sergio Tacchini; Keith Diepraam	4; 6	5; 7	3; 6

=== 1967 ===
1967 Davis Cup Europe Zone B First round

Italy
5
Verona, Italy
4–6 May 1967
Clay

Austria
0

			1	2	3	4	5
1	(Italy) (Austria)	Nicola Pietrangeli; Peter Pokorny	6; 0	6; 3	6; 1
2	(Italy) (Austria)	Giordano Maioli; Dieter Schultheiss	6; 0	6; 1	6; 2
3	(Italy) (Austria)	Vittorio Crotta / Giordano Maioli; Herbert Holzer / Peter Pokorny	7; 5	7; 5	7; 5
4	(Italy) (Austria)	Giordano Maioli; Peter Pokorny	6; 3	6; 0	6; 1
5	(Italy) (Austria)	Nicola Pietrangeli; Dieter Schultheiss	8; 6	4; 6	6; 1	7; 5

1967 Davis Cup Europe Zone B Quarterfinals

Italy
5
Piacenza, Italy
19–21 May 1967
Clay

Luxembourg
0

			1	2	3	4	5
1	(Italy) (Luxembourg)	Nicola Pietrangeli; Frank Baden	6; 1	6; 3	6; 3
2	(Italy) (Luxembourg)	Giordano Maioli; Thierry Brasseur	6; 1	6; 0	6; 2
3	(Italy) (Luxembourg)	Vittorio Crotta / Giordano Maioli; Frank Baden / Thierry Brasseur	6; 2	6; 3	6; 3
4	(Italy) (Luxembourg)	Nicola Pietrangeli; Thierry Brasseur	6; 2	6; 2	6; 0
5	(Italy) (Luxembourg)	Giordano Maioli; Frank Baden	6; 2	6; 1	6; 4

1967 Davis Cup Europe Zone B Semifinals

Italy
1
Naples, Italy
8–10 June 1967
Clay

Brazil
3

			1	2	3	4	5
1	(Italy) (Brazil)	Nicola Pietrangeli; José Edison Mandarino	6; 2	7; 9	4; 6	3; 6
2	(Italy) (Brazil)	Giordano Maioli; Thomaz Koch	0; 6	3; 6	5; 7
3	(Italy) (Brazil)	Vittorio Crotta / Giordano Maioli; Thomaz Koch / José Edison Mandarino	3; 6	4; 6	2; 6
4	(Italy) (Brazil)	Nicola Pietrangeli; Thomaz Koch	5; 7	2; 6	6; 4	6; 0	6; 0
5	(Italy) (Brazil)	Giordano Maioli; José Edison Mandarino	1; 6	1; 6	6; 4	6; 4	5; 5	not completed

=== 1968 ===
1968 Davis Cup Europe Zone A First round

Italy
5
Cagliari, Italy
2–4 May 1968
Clay

Hungary
0

			1	2	3	4	5
1	(Italy) (Hungary)	Martin Mulligan; István Gulyás	6; 4	3; 6	6; 3	2; 6	7; 5
2	(Italy) (Hungary)	Nicola Pietrangeli; Péter Szőke	6; 3	6; 2	6; 1
3	(Italy) (Hungary)	Martin Mulligan / Nicola Pietrangeli; István Gulyás / András Szikszay	7; 5	9; 7	2; 6	11; 9
4	(Italy) (Hungary)	Nicola Pietrangeli; István Gulyás	6; 4	6; 2	2; 6	1; 6	7; 5
5	(Italy) (Hungary)	Martin Mulligan; Péter Szőke	4; 6	7; 5	6; 4	6; 1

1968 Davis Cup Europe Zone A Quarterfinals

Italy
5
Biella, Italy
23–25 May 1968
Clay

Monaco
0

			1	2	3	4	5
1	(Italy) (Monaco)	Nicola Pietrangeli; André Vatrican	6; 1	6; 2	6; 1
2	(Italy) (Monaco)	Martin Mulligan; Francis Truchi	6; 0	6; 0	6; 1
3	(Italy) (Monaco)	Eugenio Castigliano / Ezio Di Matteo; Alain Manigley / Francis Truchi	6; 3	6; 1	6; 3
4	(Italy) (Monaco)	Martin Mulligan; Alain Manigley	6; 0	6; 0	6; 0
5	(Italy) (Monaco)	Eugenio Castigliano; Francis Truchi	6; 2	6; 2	6; 1

1968 Davis Cup Europe Zone A Semifinals

Italy
3
Reggio Emilia, Italy
13–16 June 1968
Clay

Soviet Union
2

			1	2	3	4	5
1	(Italy) (Soviet Union)	Nicola Pietrangeli; Toomas Leius	6; 4	4; 6	6; 1	6; 2
2	(Italy) (Soviet Union)	Martin Mulligan; Alex Metreveli	3; 6	1; 6	3; 6
3	(Italy) (Soviet Union)	Martin Mulligan / Nicola Pietrangeli; Sergei Likhachev / Alex Metreveli	6; 3	4; 6	6; 2	6; 4
4	(Italy) (Soviet Union)	Nicola Pietrangeli; Alex Metreveli	0; 6	0; 6	1; 6
5	(Italy) (Soviet Union)	Martin Mulligan; Toomas Leius	6; 2	6; 4	7; 5

1968 Davis Cup Europe Zone A Final

Spain
3
Real Club de Tenis, Barcelona, Spain
19–21 July 1968
Clay

Italy
2

			1	2	3	4	5
1	(Spain) (Italy)	Juan Gisbert; Martin Mulligan	6; 4	2; 6	6; 2	6; 4
2	(Spain) (Italy)	Manuel Santana; Nicola Pietrangeli	6; 3	3; 6	4; 6	6; 4	6; 2
3	(Spain) (Italy)	José Luis Arilla / Manuel Orantes; Martin Mulligan / Nicola Pietrangeli	5; 7	2; 6	6; 3	3; 6
4	(Spain) (Italy)	Juan Gisbert; Nicola Pietrangeli	8; 6	6; 4	6; 2
5	(Spain) (Italy)	Manuel Orantes; Martin Mulligan	6; 4	6; 4	5; 7	3; 6	4; 4

=== 1969 ===
1969 Davis Cup Europe Zone A First Round

Italy
4
Genoa, Italy
9–11 May 1969
Clay

Belgium
1

			1	2	3	4	5
1	(Italy) (Belgium)	Nicola Pietrangeli; Patrick Hombergen	6; 3	6; 2	6; 3
2	(Italy) (Belgium)	Eugenio Castigliano; Eric Drossart	6; 4	4; 6	6; 4	5; 7	6; 1
3	(Italy) (Belgium)	Vittorio Crotta / Pietro Marzano; Eric Drossart / Patrick Hombergen	2; 6	3; 6	5; 7
4	(Italy) (Belgium)	Nicola Pietrangeli; Eric Drossart	7; 5	6; 4	7; 9	6; 4
5	(Italy) (Belgium)	Eugenio Castigliano; Patrick Hombergen	3; 6	6; 3	6; 4	6; 4

1969 Davis Cup Europe Zone A Quarterfinals

Italy
5
Barletta, Italy
23–25 May 1969
Clay

Austria
0

			1	2	3	4	5
1	(Italy) (Austria)	Nicola Pietrangeli; Detlef Herdy	6; 1	8; 6	6; 3
2	(Italy) (Austria)	Eugenio Castigliano; Ernst Blanke	1; 6	6; 3	3; 6	4; 4		retired
3	(Italy) (Austria)	Vittorio Crotta / Pietro Marzano; Detlef Herdy / Hans Kary	6; 2	6; 2	6; 4
4	(Italy) (Austria)	Nicola Pietrangeli; Ernst Blanke	3; 6	7; 5	6; 2	1; 6	8; 6
5	(Italy) (Austria)	Eugenio Castigliano; Dieter Schultheiss	3; 6	6; 1	6; 2	6; 1

1969 Davis Cup Europe Zone A Semifinals

Soviet Union
5
Moscow, Soviet Union
13–15 June 1969

Italy
0

			1	2	3	4	5
1	(Soviet Union) (Italy)	Toomas Leius; Nicola Pietrangeli	6; 4	6; 4	6; 8	6; 3
2	(Soviet Union) (Italy)	Alex Metreveli; Eugenio Castigliano	6; 1	6; 2	6; 3
3	(Soviet Union) (Italy)	Sergei Likhachev / Alex Metreveli; Vittorio Crotta / Pietro Marzano	7; 5	6; 4	8; 6
4	(Soviet Union) (Italy)	Alex Metreveli; Nicola Pietrangeli	6; 2	6; 2	6; 2
5	(Soviet Union) (Italy)	Toomas Leius; Eugenio Castigliano	4; 6	3; 6	6; 4	7; 5	6; 2

== See also ==
- Italy Davis Cup team results (1922–1949)
- Italy Davis Cup team results (1970–1999)
- Italy Davis Cup team results (2000–present)
