= 1961 Davis Cup Europe Zone =

International tennis competition

The Europe Zone was one of the three regional zones of the 1961 Davis Cup.

28 teams entered the Europe Zone, with the winner going on to compete in the Inter-Zonal Zone against the winners of the America Zone and Eastern Zone. Italy defeated Sweden in the final and progressed to the Inter-Zonal Zone.

== Draw ==
First Round; 27 April–7 May
Italy
bye
Belgium	3
Chile	2
Switzerland	2
Netherlands	3
Czechoslovakia	2
West Germany	3
Ireland	0
Poland	5
Monaco	3
Luxembourg	2
Egypt	0
Brazil	5
bye
France
Great Britain
bye
Austria	5
Norway	0
Turkey	1
Finland	4
Romania	0
South Africa	5
Yugoslavia	1
Spain	3
Israel	0
New Zealand	5
Denmark	2
Hungary	3
bye
Sweden

Second Round; 1–5 June
Brussels, Belgium (clay)
Italy	3
Belgium	2
Scheveningen, Netherlands (clay)
Netherlands	0
West Germany	5
Warsaw, Poland
Poland	4
Monaco	1
Paris, France (clay)
Brazil	1
France	4
Vienna, Austria (clay)
Great Britain	3
Austria	2
Helsinki, Finland
Finland	1
South Africa	4
Madrid, Spain (clay)
Spain	3
New Zealand	2
Budapest, Hungary (clay)
Hungary	2
Sweden	3

Quarterfinals; 10–19 June
Munich, West Germany (clay)
Italy	3
West Germany	2
Warsaw, Poland
Poland	0
France	5
Birmingham, England (grass)
Great Britain	4
South Africa	1
Madrid, Spain (clay)
Spain	1
Sweden	4

Semifinals; 21–23 July
Paris, France (clay)
Italy	4
France	1
Båstad, Sweden (clay)
Great Britain	1
Sweden	4

Final; 4–6 August
Milan, Italy (clay)
Italy	4
Sweden	1

== First round ==
=== Belgium vs. Chile ===
Belgium
3
Brussels, Belgium
5–7 May 1961

Chile
2

			1	2	3	4	5
1	(Belgium) (Chile)	Jacques Brichant; Patricio Apey	6; 4	6; 1	6; 1
2	(Belgium) (Chile)	Jean-Claude Van der Borght; Patricio Rodríguez	2; 6	3; 6	3; 6
3	(Belgium) (Chile)	Jacques Brichant / Philippe Washer; Ernesto Aguirre / Patricio Rodríguez	7; 5	7; 5	4; 6	6; 4
4	(Belgium) (Chile)	Jean-Claude Van der Borght; Patricio Apey	4; 6	6; 8	2; 6
5	(Belgium) (Chile)	Jacques Brichant; Patricio Rodríguez	6; 1	7; 9	8; 6	6; 1

=== Switzerland vs. Netherlands ===
Switzerland
2
Lucerne, Switzerland
5–7 May 1961

Netherlands
3

			1	2	3	4	5
1	(Switzerland) (Netherlands)	Heinz Grimm; Willem Maris	3; 6	1; 6	2; 6
2	(Switzerland) (Netherlands)	Martin Froesch; Pieter van Eijsden	7; 5	6; 2	6; 4
3	(Switzerland) (Netherlands)	Heinz Grimm / Ernst Schori; Pieter van Eijsden / Willem Maris	9; 11	3; 6	7; 9
4	(Switzerland) (Netherlands)	Martin Froesch; Willem Maris	6; 3	6; 1	6; 3
5	(Switzerland) (Netherlands)	Heinz Grimm; Pieter van Eijsden	7; 5	4; 6	3; 6	2; 6

=== Czechoslovakia vs. West Germany ===
Czechoslovakia
2
Prague, Czechoslovakia
4–6 May 1961

West Germany
3

			1	2	3	4	5
1	(Czechoslovakia) (West Germany)	Pavel Korda; Wilhelm Bungert	3; 6	8; 10	6; 2	6; 3	5; 7
2	(Czechoslovakia) (West Germany)	Jiří Javorský; Christian Kuhnke	6; 3	7; 5	5; 7	2; 6	3; 6
3	(Czechoslovakia) (West Germany)	Jiří Javorský / Jiří Parma; Wilhelm Bungert / Christian Kuhnke	6; 8	6; 3	6; 1	3; 6	4; 6
4	(Czechoslovakia) (West Germany)	Pavel Korda; Christian Kuhnke	6; 2	6; 2	6; 1
5	(Czechoslovakia) (West Germany)	Jiří Javorský; Dieter Ecklebe	6; 4	2; 6	2; 6	6; 4	6; 3

=== Ireland vs. Poland ===
Ireland
0
Dublin, Ireland
5–7 May 1961

Poland
5

			1	2	3	4	5
1	(Republic of Ireland) (Poland)	James Buckley; Władysław Skonecki	4; 6	6; 4	4; 6	4; 6
2	(Republic of Ireland) (Poland)	Peter Jackson; Wiesław Gąsiorek	3; 6	7; 5	6; 3	6; 8	4; 6
3	(Republic of Ireland) (Poland)	Vivian Gotto / Joseph Hackett; Wiesław Gąsiorek / Władysław Skonecki	3; 6	6; 3	3; 6	6; 4	3; 6
4	(Republic of Ireland) (Poland)	James Buckley; Wiesław Gąsiorek	4; 6	4; 6	3; 6
5	(Republic of Ireland) (Poland)	Peter Jackson; Józef Orlikowski	4; 6	3; 6	6; 8

=== Monaco vs. Luxembourg ===
Monaco
3
Monte Carlo, Monaco
29 April–1 May 1961

Luxembourg
2

			1	2	3	4	5
1	(Monaco) (Luxembourg)	Roland Borghini; Joseph Offenheim	6; 4	6; 0	6; 2
2	(Monaco) (Luxembourg)	Georges Pasquier; Frank Baden	5; 7	2; 6	3; 6
3	(Monaco) (Luxembourg)	Roland Borghini / Georges Pasquier; Joseph Offenheim / Gaston Wampach	6; 4	6; 8	3; 6	6; 3	6; 2
4	(Monaco) (Luxembourg)	Roland Borghini; Frank Baden	9; 7	1; 6	3; 6	2; 6
5	(Monaco) (Luxembourg)	Georges Pasquier; Joseph Offenheim	6; 2	6; 1	6; 2

=== Egypt vs. Brazil ===
Egypt
0
Cairo, Egypt
5–7 May 1961

Brazil
5

			1	2	3	4	5
1	(Egypt) (Brazil)	Ibrahim Badreldin-Sayed; Carlos Alberto Fernandes	1; 6	6; 3	4; 6	3; 6
2	(Egypt) (Brazil)	Fathi Mohammed-Ali; José Edison Mandarino	2; 6	1; 6	3; 6
3	(Egypt) (Brazil)	Ibrahim Badreldin-Sayed / Fathi Mohammed-Ali; Carlos Alberto Fernandes / José Edison Mandarino	3; 6	3; 6	3; 6
4	(Egypt) (Brazil)	Fathi Mohammed-Ali; Carlos Alberto Fernandes	8; 6	1; 6	0; 6	1; 6
5	(Egypt) (Brazil)	Ibrahim Badreldin-Sayed; José Edison Mandarino	2; 6	2; 6	2; 6

=== Austria vs. Norway ===
Austria
5
Vienna, Austria
5–7 May 1961
Clay

Norway
0

			1	2	3	4	5
1	(Austria) (Norway)	Franz Saiko; Finn-Dag Jagge	6; 4	6; 1	6; 1
2	(Austria) (Norway)	Ladislav Legenstein; Thorvald Moe	6; 4	6; 3	6; 2
3	(Austria) (Norway)	Ladislav Legenstein / Franz Saiko; Finn-Dag Jagge / Thorvald Moe	6; 3	6; 1	6; 1
4	(Austria) (Norway)	Franz Saiko; Thorvald Moe	6; 4	6; 1	6; 3
5	(Austria) (Norway)	Franz Hainka; Finn-Dag Jagge	6; 4	6; 1	6; 2

=== Turkey vs. Finland ===
Turkey
1
Istanbul, Turkey
5–7 May 1961

Finland
4

			1	2	3	4	5
1	(Turkey) (Finland)	Nazmi Bari; Sakari Salo	6; 3	3; 6	4; 6	4; 6
2	(Turkey) (Finland)	Engin Balas; Reino Nyyssönen	2; 6	1; 6	0; 6
3	(Turkey) (Finland)	Engin Balas / Nazmi Bari; Reino Nyyssönen / Sakari Salo	1; 6	10; 12	1; 6
4	(Turkey) (Finland)	Engin Balas; Matti Kinnunen	6; 3	6; 3	6; 2
5	(Turkey) (Finland)	Ziya Kipkizilorenli; Reino Nyyssönen	6; 4	3; 6	0; 6	1; 6

=== Romania vs. South Africa ===
Romania
0
Bucharest, Romania
5–7 May 1961
Clay

South Africa
5

			1	2	3	4	5
1	(Romania) (South Africa)	Ion Țiriac; Julius Mayer	0; 6	6; 3	2; 6	14; 12	0; 6
2	(Romania) (South Africa)	Gheorghe Viziru; Abe Segal	1; 6	5; 7	4; 6
3	(Romania) (South Africa)	Ion Țiriac / Gheorghe Viziru; Albert Gaertner / Abe Segal	2; 6	2; 6	2; 6
4	(Romania) (South Africa)	Gheorghe Viziru; Julius Mayer	10; 8	5; 7	6; 3	5; 7	0; 6
5	(Romania) (South Africa)	Ion Țiriac; Albert Gaertner	1; 6	6; 2	6; 1	3; 6	5; 7

=== Yugoslavia vs. Spain ===
Yugoslavia
1
Split, Yugoslavia
5–7 May 1961

Spain
3

			1	2	3	4	5
1	(Socialist Federal Republic of Yugoslavia) (Spain)	Vladimir Presečki; Emilio Martínez del Rey	8; 6	3; 6	9; 7	6; 0
2	(Socialist Federal Republic of Yugoslavia) (Spain)	Boro Jovanović; Manuel Santana	3; 6	6; 8	1; 6
3	(Socialist Federal Republic of Yugoslavia) (Spain)	Boro Jovanović / Nikola Pilić; Alberto Arilla / Manuel Santana	3; 6	5; 7	5; 7
4	(Socialist Federal Republic of Yugoslavia) (Spain)	Vladimir Presečki; Manuel Santana	3; 6	2; 6	1; 6
5	(Socialist Federal Republic of Yugoslavia) (Spain)	Boro Jovanović; Emilio Martínez del Rey						not played

=== Israel vs. New Zealand ===
Israel
0
Tel Aviv, Israel
27–29 April 1961
Hard

New Zealand
5

			1	2	3	4	5
1	(Israel) (New Zealand)	Gabriel Dubitzky; Mark Otway	2; 6	6; 8	0; 6
2	(Israel) (New Zealand)	Eleazar Davidman; Lew Gerrard	1; 6	1; 6	6; 3	4; 6
3	(Israel) (New Zealand)	Eleazar Davidman / Gabriel Dubitzky; Lew Gerrard / Mark Otway	3; 6	2; 6	3; 6
4	(Israel) (New Zealand)	Eleazar Davidman; Mark Otway	4; 6	2; 6	6; 8
5	(Israel) (New Zealand)	Gabriel Dubitzky; Lew Gerrard	2; 6	6; 4	0; 6	1; 6

=== Denmark vs. Hungary ===
Denmark
2
Aarhus, Denmark
5–7 May 1961
Clay

Hungary
3

			1	2	3	4	5
1	(Denmark) (Hungary)	Jan Leschly; Zoltán Katona	6; 4	5; 7	5; 7	4; 6
2	(Denmark) (Hungary)	Jørgen Ulrich; István Gulyás	5; 7	2; 6	6; 3	6; 2	6; 4
3	(Denmark) (Hungary)	Jørgen Ulrich / Torben Ulrich; István Gulyás / András Szikszay	2; 6	2; 6	6; 4	9; 9		retired
4	(Denmark) (Hungary)	Jørgen Ulrich; Zoltán Katona	6; 3	6; 0	6; 1
5	(Denmark) (Hungary)	Jan Leschly; István Gulyás	5; 7	6; 4	4; 6	4; 6

== Second round ==
=== Belgium vs. Italy ===
Belgium
2
Brussels, Belgium
2–4 June 1961
Clay

Italy
3

			1	2	3	4	5
1	(Belgium) (Italy)	Jacques Brichant; Nicola Pietrangeli	2; 6	2; 6	6; 0	6; 1	6; 1
2	(Belgium) (Italy)	Eric Drossart; Orlando Sirola	6; 2	4; 6	5; 7	2; 6
3	(Belgium) (Italy)	Jacques Brichant / Jean-Claude Van der Borght; Nicola Pietrangeli / Orlando Sirola	5; 7	4; 6	3; 6
4	(Belgium) (Italy)	Eric Drossart; Nicola Pietrangeli	3; 6	2; 6	5; 7
5	(Belgium) (Italy)	Jacques Brichant; Orlando Sirola	6; 1	7; 5	6; 0

=== Netherlands vs. West Germany ===
Netherlands
0
Scheveningen, Netherlands
2–4 June 1961
Clay

West Germany
5

			1	2	3	4	5
1	(Netherlands) (West Germany)	Willem Maris; Christian Kuhnke	3; 6	1; 6	5; 7
2	(Netherlands) (West Germany)	Pieter van Eijsden; Wilhelm Bungert	2; 6	4; 6	4; 6
3	(Netherlands) (West Germany)	Pieter van Eijsden / Willem Maris; Wilhelm Bungert / Christian Kuhnke	5; 7	2; 6	6; 3	6; 8
4	(Netherlands) (West Germany)	Pieter van Eijsden; Dieter Ecklebe	2; 6	3; 6	1; 6
5	(Netherlands) (West Germany)	Willem Maris; Ingo Buding	3; 6	6; 4	0; 6	6; 3	3; 6

=== Poland vs. Monaco ===
Poland
4
Warsaw, Poland
2–4 June 1961

Monaco
1

			1	2	3	4	5
1	(Poland) (Monaco)	Władysław Skonecki; Roland Borghini	6; 8	6; 3	6; 4	6; 2
2	(Poland) (Monaco)	Wiesław Gąsiorek; Adrien Viviani	6; 4	6; 1	6; 2
3	(Poland) (Monaco)	Wiesław Nowicki / Józef Orlikowski; Roland Borghini / Adrien Viviani	6; 2	6; 1	1; 6	3; 6	6; 1
4	(Poland) (Monaco)	Józef Orlikowski; Roland Borghini	8; 10	6; 3	6; 2	6; 8	4; 6
5	(Poland) (Monaco)	Wiesław Nowicki; Adrien Viviani	6; 4	6; 4	6; 2

=== France vs. Brazil ===
France
4
Stade Roland Garros, Paris, France
2–4 June 1961
Clay

Brazil
1

			1	2	3	4	5
1	(France) (Brazil)	Pierre Darmon; Ronald Barnes	1; 6	6; 0	6; 4	6; 1
2	(France) (Brazil)	Gérard Pilet; Carlos Alberto Fernandes	6; 4	6; 1	6; 1
3	(France) (Brazil)	Daniel Contet / Jacques Renavand; Ronald Barnes / Carlos Alberto Fernandes	4; 6	3; 6	6; 4	9; 7	3; 6
4	(France) (Brazil)	Gérard Pilet; Ronald Barnes	6; 1	6; 4	4; 6	2; 6	6; 4
5	(France) (Brazil)	Pierre Darmon; José Edison Mandarino	5; 7	6; 1	9; 7	3; 3		retired

=== Austria vs. Great Britain ===
Austria
2
Vienna, Austria
1–3 June 1961
Clay

Great Britain
3

			1	2	3	4	5
1	(Austria) (United Kingdom)	Ladislav Legenstein; Mike Sangster	5; 7	3; 6	3; 6
2	(Austria) (United Kingdom)	Franz Saiko; Bobby Wilson	6; 2	9; 7	4; 6	6; 2
3	(Austria) (United Kingdom)	Franz Hainka / Ladislav Legenstein; Mike Sangster / Bobby Wilson	6; 4	10; 12	3; 6	5; 7
4	(Austria) (United Kingdom)	Ladislav Legenstein; Bobby Wilson	4; 6	4; 6	4; 6
5	(Austria) (United Kingdom)	Franz Saiko; Alan Mills	6; 0	6; 0	6; 3

=== Finland vs. South Africa ===
Finland
1
Helsinki, Finland
1–3 June 1961

South Africa
4

			1	2	3	4	5
1	(Finland) (South Africa)	Reino Nyyssönen; Julius Mayer	1; 6	7; 5	6; 1	6; 0
2	(Finland) (South Africa)	Sakari Salo; Abe Segal	1; 6	2; 6	3; 6
3	(Finland) (South Africa)	Reino Nyyssönen / Sakari Salo; Albert Gaertner / Abe Segal	2; 6	0; 6	1; 6
4	(Finland) (South Africa)	Sakari Salo; Julius Mayer	1; 6	2; 6	3; 6
5	(Finland) (South Africa)	Reino Nyyssönen; Abe Segal	2; 6	3; 6	4; 6

=== Spain vs. New Zealand ===
Spain
3
Real Madrid Club de Tenis, Madrid, Spain
2–4 June 1961
Clay

New Zealand
2

			1	2	3	4	5
1	(Spain) (New Zealand)	Emilio Martínez del Rey; Lew Gerrard	3; 6	4; 6	2; 6
2	(Spain) (New Zealand)	Manuel Santana; Mark Otway	6; 3	6; 1	6; 3
3	(Spain) (New Zealand)	Alberto Arilla / Manuel Santana; Lew Gerrard / Mark Otway	9; 7	6; 4	6; 3
4	(Spain) (New Zealand)	Emilio Martínez del Rey; Mark Otway	4; 6	3; 6	6; 8
5	(Spain) (New Zealand)	Manuel Santana; Lew Gerrard	6; 1	6; 4	6; 2

=== Hungary vs. Sweden ===
Hungary
2
Budapest, Hungary
2–5 June 1961
Clay

Sweden
3

			1	2	3	4	5
1	(Hungary) (Sweden)	Zoltán Katona; Ulf Schmidt	3; 6	3; 6	2; 6
2	(Hungary) (Sweden)	István Gulyás; Jan-Erik Lundqvist	6; 0	5; 7	6; 4	4; 6	4; 6
3	(Hungary) (Sweden)	István Gulyás / András Szikszay; Jan-Erik Lundqvist / Ulf Schmidt	6; 4	7; 5	6; 3
4	(Hungary) (Sweden)	István Gulyás; Ulf Schmidt	2; 6	3; 6	3; 6
5	(Hungary) (Sweden)	Zoltán Katona; Jan-Erik Lundqvist	8; 6	2; 6	6; 4			retired

== Quarterfinals ==
=== West Germany vs. Italy ===
West Germany
2
Munich, West Germany
16–19 June 1961
Clay

Italy
3

			1	2	3	4	5
1	(West Germany) (Italy)	Christian Kuhnke; Nicola Pietrangeli	1; 6	6; 3	4; 6	6; 2	1; 6
2	(West Germany) (Italy)	Wilhelm Bungert; Orlando Sirola	6; 4	6; 3	7; 5
3	(West Germany) (Italy)	Wilhelm Bungert / Christian Kuhnke; Nicola Pietrangeli / Orlando Sirola	6; 2	5; 7	6; 3	2; 6	1; 6
4	(West Germany) (Italy)	Christian Kuhnke; Orlando Sirola	9; 7	6; 3	3; 6	11; 9
5	(West Germany) (Italy)	Wilhelm Bungert; Nicola Pietrangeli	5; 7	11; 9	0; 6	6; 3	4; 6

=== Poland vs. France ===
Poland
0
Warsaw, Poland
10–12 June 1961

France
5

			1	2	3	4	5
1	(Poland) (France)	Wiesław Gąsiorek; Pierre Darmon	4; 6	7; 9	0; 6
2	(Poland) (France)	Władysław Skonecki; Gérard Pilet	1; 6	4; 6	6; 3	4; 6
3	(Poland) (France)	Józef Orlikowski / Władysław Skonecki; Pierre Darmon / Jacques Renavand	3; 6	4; 6	3; 6
4	(Poland) (France)	Wiesław Gąsiorek; Jacques Renavand	4; 6	2; 6	6; 1	1; 6
5	(Poland) (France)	Józef Orlikowski; Daniel Contet	6; 3	5; 7	6; 4	6; 8	3; 6

=== Great Britain vs. South Africa ===
Great Britain
4
Priory Lawn Tennis Club, Birmingham, England
15–17 June 1961
Grass

South Africa
1

			1	2	3	4	5
1	(United Kingdom) (South Africa)	Mike Sangster; Julius Mayer	6; 3	6; 2	6; 4
2	(United Kingdom) (South Africa)	Bobby Wilson; Abe Segal	6; 4	6; 4	6; 4
3	(United Kingdom) (South Africa)	Mike Sangster / Bobby Wilson; Albert Gaertner / Abe Segal	9; 11	4; 6	5; 7
4	(United Kingdom) (South Africa)	Bobby Wilson; Julius Mayer	6; 3	6; 3	6; 2
5	(United Kingdom) (South Africa)	Mike Sangster; Abe Segal	6; 1	13; 15	6; 2	10; 8

=== Spain vs. Sweden ===
Spain
1
Real Madrid Club de Tenis, Madrid, Spain
16–18 June 1961
Clay

Sweden
4

			1	2	3	4	5
1	(Spain) (Sweden)	Alberto Arilla; Ulf Schmidt	0; 6	2; 6	2; 6
2	(Spain) (Sweden)	Manuel Santana; Jan-Erik Lundqvist	3; 6	4; 6	6; 2	6; 2	6; 2
3	(Spain) (Sweden)	Alberto Arilla / Manuel Santana; Sven Davidson / Ulf Schmidt	2; 6	3; 6	2; 6
4	(Spain) (Sweden)	Alberto Arilla; Jan-Erik Lundqvist	7; 9	4; 6	4; 6
5	(Spain) (Sweden)	Emilio Martínez del Rey; Ulf Schmidt	2; 6	6; 4	5; 7	2; 6

== Semifinals ==
=== France vs. Italy ===
France
1
Stade Roland Garros, Paris, France
21–23 July 1961
Clay

Italy
4

			1	2	3	4	5
1	(France) (Italy)	Pierre Darmon; Nicola Pietrangeli	7; 5	0; 6	4; 6	6; 3	2; 6
2	(France) (Italy)	Gérard Pilet; Fausto Gardini	6; 2	3; 6	2; 6	3; 6
3	(France) (Italy)	Pierre Darmon / Jean-Noël Grinda; Nicola Pietrangeli / Orlando Sirola	6; 4	3; 6	4; 6	5; 7
4	(France) (Italy)	Jacques Renavand; Giuseppe Merlo	6; 3	0; 6	4; 6	7; 5	6; 3
5	(France) (Italy)	Jean-Noël Grinda; Fausto Gardini	8; 10	2; 6	5; 7

=== Sweden vs. Great Britain ===
Sweden
4
Båstad Tennis Stadium, Båstad, Sweden
21–23 July 1961
Clay

Great Britain
1

			1	2	3	4	5
1	(Sweden) (United Kingdom)	Jan-Erik Lundqvist; Bobby Wilson	6; 4	6; 3	5; 7	6; 4
2	(Sweden) (United Kingdom)	Ulf Schmidt; Mike Sangster	6; 2	6; 4	8; 6
3	(Sweden) (United Kingdom)	Jan-Erik Lundqvist / Ulf Schmidt; Tony Pickard / Bobby Wilson	3; 6	6; 3	1; 6	6; 8
4	(Sweden) (United Kingdom)	Ulf Schmidt; Bobby Wilson	9; 7	6; 0	6; 4
5	(Sweden) (United Kingdom)	Jan-Erik Lundqvist; Mike Sangster	6; 4	6; 4	6; 2

== Final ==
=== Italy vs. Sweden ===
Italy
4
Milan, Italy
4–6 August 1961
Clay

Sweden
1

			1	2	3	4	5
1	(Italy) (Sweden)	Fausto Gardini; Ulf Schmidt	6; 4	4; 6	1; 6	6; 3	6; 1
2	(Italy) (Sweden)	Nicola Pietrangeli; Jan-Erik Lundqvist	2; 6	5; 7	6; 1	4; 6
3	(Italy) (Sweden)	Nicola Pietrangeli / Orlando Sirola; Thomas Hallberg / Jan-Erik Lundqvist	6; 3	3; 6	6; 3	6; 1
4	(Italy) (Sweden)	Nicola Pietrangeli; Ulf Schmidt	6; 3	6; 2	3; 6	6; 3
5	(Italy) (Sweden)	Fausto Gardini; Thomas Hallberg	6; 2	6; 1	6; 0
