= 1962 Davis Cup Europe Zone =

International tennis competition

The Europe Zone was one of the three regional zones of the 1962 Davis Cup.

28 teams entered the Europe Zone, with the winner going on to compete in the Inter-Zonal Zone against the winners of the America Zone and Eastern Zone. Sweden defeated Italy in the final and progressed to the Inter-Zonal Zone.

== Draw ==
First Round; 4–7 May
Italy
bye
Netherlands	0
Soviet Union	5
Hungary	5
Luxembourg	0
Denmark	4
New Zealand	1
Norway	0
Poland	5
Monaco	0
Brazil	5
Ireland	1
Austria	4
bye
Great Britain
France
bye
Switzerland	0
South Africa	4
Spain	2
West Germany	3
Romania	4
Israel	1
Lebanon	1
Finland	4
Czechoslovakia	4
Egypt	1
Belgium	4
Chile	1
bye
Sweden

Second Round; 18–21 May
Florence, Italy (clay)
Italy	5
Soviet Union	0
Budapest, Hungary (clay)
Hungary	5
Denmark	0
Warsaw, Poland
Poland	0
Brazil	3
Vienna, Austria (clay)
Austria	1
Great Britain	4
Paris, France (clay)
France	2
South Africa	3
Hanover, West Germany
West Germany	5
Romania	0
Helsinki, Finland
Finland	0
Czechoslovakia	5
Brussels, Belgium (clay)
Belgium	0
Sweden	5

Quarterfinals; 14–17 June
Brescia, Italy (clay)
Italy	4
Hungary	1
Eastbourne, England (grass)
Brazil	1
Great Britain	4
West Berlin
South Africa	3
West Germany	2
Stockholm, Sweden (clay)
Czechoslovakia	0
Sweden	5

Semifinals; 13–15 July
Milan, Italy (clay)
Italy	5
Great Britain	0
Båstad, Sweden (clay)
South Africa	1
Sweden	4

Final; 27–29 July
Båstad, Sweden (clay)
Italy	1
Sweden	4

== First round ==
=== Netherlands vs. Soviet Union ===
Netherlands
0
Scheveningen, Netherlands
5–7 May 1962
Clay

Soviet Union
5

			1	2	3	4	5
1	(Netherlands) (Soviet Union)	Willem Maris; Toomas Leius	1; 6	1; 6	2; 6
2	(Netherlands) (Soviet Union)	Evert Schneider; Sergei Likhachev	3; 6	1; 6	6; 4	4; 6
3	(Netherlands) (Soviet Union)	Willem Maris / Evert Schneider; Toomas Leius / Sergei Likhachev	1; 6	5; 7	2; 6
4	(Netherlands) (Soviet Union)	Pieter van Eijsden; Sergei Likhachev	1; 6	1; 6	1; 6
5	(Netherlands) (Soviet Union)	Evert Schneider; Rudolf Sivokhin	5; 7	5; 7	2; 6

=== Hungary vs. Luxembourg ===
Hungary
5
Budapest, Hungary
4–6 May 1962

Luxembourg
0

			1	2	3	4	5
1	(Hungary) (Luxembourg)	Zoltán Katona; Jean Neuman	6; 0	6; 2	6; 3
2	(Hungary) (Luxembourg)	István Gulyás; Joseph Offenheim	6; 3	6; 1	6; 1
3	(Hungary) (Luxembourg)	István Gulyás / András Szikszay; Joseph Offenheim / Gaston Wampach	6; 1	6; 1	6; 3
4	(Hungary) (Luxembourg)	István Gulyás; Jean Neuman	6; 1	6; 2	6; 3
5	(Hungary) (Luxembourg)	Zoltán Katona; Joseph Offenheim	6; 1	6; 2	6; 2

=== Denmark vs. New Zealand ===
Denmark
4
Copenhagen, Denmark
4–6 May 1962
Clay

New Zealand
1

			1	2	3	4	5
1	(Denmark) (New Zealand)	Jan Leschly; John Souter	6; 2	7; 5	6; 4
2	(Denmark) (New Zealand)	Jørgen Ulrich; Ian Crookenden	6; 2	1; 6	10; 8	2; 6	10; 8
3	(Denmark) (New Zealand)	Jan Leschly / Jørgen Ulrich; Ian Crookenden / John Souter	8; 6	6; 3	6; 4
4	(Denmark) (New Zealand)	Jan Leschly; Ian Crookenden	6; 2	3; 6	8; 6	6; 0
5	(Denmark) (New Zealand)	Carl-Edvard Hedelund; John Souter	3; 6	2; 6	6; 4	0; 6

=== Norway vs. Poland ===
Norway
0
Oslo, Norway
4–7 May 1962
Clay

Poland
5

			1	2	3	4	5
1	(Norway) (Poland)	Per Hegna; Władysław Skonecki	3; 6	1; 6	0; 6
2	(Norway) (Poland)	Finn Søhol; Wiesław Gąsiorek	2; 6	6; 3	2; 6	2; 6
3	(Norway) (Poland)	Sjur Lars Galtung-Hansen / Finn Søhol; Wiesław Gąsiorek / Józef Orlikowski	4; 6	4; 6	1; 6
4	(Norway) (Poland)	Per Hegna; Wiesław Gąsiorek	2; 6	6; 4	1; 6	4; 6
5	(Norway) (Poland)	Finn Søhol; Józef Orlikowski	6; 1	6; 2	3; 6	3; 6	4; 6

=== Monaco vs. Brazil ===
Monaco
0
Monte Carlo, Monaco
4–6 May 1962

Brazil
5

			1	2	3	4	5
1	(Monaco) (Brazil)	Adrien Viviani; José Edison Mandarino	0; 6	1; 6	0; 6
2	(Monaco) (Brazil)	Roland Borghini; Carlos Alberto Fernandes	4; 6	2; 6	2; 6
3	(Monaco) (Brazil)	Roland Borghini / René Ruzic; Thomaz Koch / José Edison Mandarino	0; 6	2; 6	3; 6
4	(Monaco) (Brazil)	Adrien Viviani; Carlos Alberto Fernandes	1; 6	2; 6	3; 6
5	(Monaco) (Brazil)	Roland Borghini; Thomaz Koch	5; 7	3; 6	1; 6

=== Ireland vs. Austria ===
Ireland
1
Fitzwilliam Lawn Tennis Club, Dublin, Ireland
4–6 May 1962
Grass

Austria
4

			1	2	3	4	5
1	(Republic of Ireland) (Austria)	Peter Jackson; Franz Saiko	5; 7	2; 6	1; 6
2	(Republic of Ireland) (Austria)	Robin Condy; Ladislav Legenstein	0; 6	2; 6	2; 6
3	(Republic of Ireland) (Austria)	Derek Arthurs / Michael Hickey; Detlef Herdy / Ladislav Legenstein	3; 6	3; 6	7; 9
4	(Republic of Ireland) (Austria)	Derek Arthurs; Franz Saiko	1; 6	2; 6
5	(Republic of Ireland) (Austria)	Peter Jackson; Detlef Herdy	6; 4	1; 6	6; 4

=== Switzerland vs. South Africa ===
Switzerland
0
Lausanne, Switzerland
4–6 May 1962

South Africa
4

			1	2	3	4	5
1	(Switzerland) (South Africa)	Martin Froesch; Abe Segal	2; 6	1; 6	3; 6
2	(Switzerland) (South Africa)	Jorge Paulo Lemann; Gordon Forbes	3; 6	7; 5	6; 3	5; 7	1; 6
3	(Switzerland) (South Africa)	Paul Blondel / Bruno Spielmann; Gordon Forbes / Abe Segal	3; 6	1; 6	2; 6
4	(Switzerland) (South Africa)	Jorge Paulo Lemann; Cliff Drysdale	9; 11	2; 6	4; 6
5	(Switzerland) (South Africa)	Martin Froesch; Gordon Forbes						not played

=== Spain vs. West Germany ===
Spain
2
Real Madrid Club de Tenis, Madrid, Spain
4–6 May 1962
Clay

West Germany
3

			1	2	3	4	5
1	(Spain) (West Germany)	Manuel Santana; Ingo Buding	6; 3	1; 6	2; 6	6; 2	5; 7
2	(Spain) (West Germany)	Juan Manuel Couder; Wilhelm Bungert	1; 6	6; 4	6; 2	4; 6	7; 5
3	(Spain) (West Germany)	José Luis Arilla / Manuel Santana; Wilhelm Bungert / Christian Kuhnke	7; 9	4; 6	6; 3	9; 11
4	(Spain) (West Germany)	Manuel Santana; Wilhelm Bungert	2; 6	5; 7	3; 6
5	(Spain) (West Germany)	Juan Manuel Couder; Ingo Buding	6; 4	6; 3	6; 2

=== Romania vs. Israel ===
Romania
4
Bucharest, Romania
4–6 May 1962
Clay

Israel
1

			1	2	3	4	5
1	(Romania) (Israel)	Ion Țiriac; Eleazar Davidman	6; 0	6; 3	6; 3
2	(Romania) (Israel)	Constantin Năstase; Gabriel Dubitzky	6; 0	6; 1	6; 1
3	(Romania) (Israel)	Petre Mărmureanu / Ion Țiriac; Eleazar Davidman / Gabriel Dubitzky	6; 4	6; 1	6; 4
4	(Romania) (Israel)	Constantin Năstase; Eleazar Davidman	6; 4	6; 1	1; 6	3; 6	4; 6
5	(Romania) (Israel)	Ion Țiriac; Gabriel Dubitzky	6; 3	6; 1	6; 1

=== Lebanon vs. Finland ===
Lebanon
1
Alumni Club, Beirut, Lebanon
4–6 May 1962
Clay

Finland
4

			1	2	3	4	5
1	(Lebanon) (Finland)	Édouard Samuel; Reino Nyyssönen	1; 6	0; 6	2; 6
2	(Lebanon) (Finland)	Karim Fawaz; Sakari Salo	6; 4	6; 3	7; 5
3	(Lebanon) (Finland)	Karim Fawaz / Édouard Samuel; Reino Nyyssönen / Sakari Salo	2; 6	7; 5	6; 8	7; 9
4	(Lebanon) (Finland)	Édouard Samuel; Sakari Salo	8; 6	2; 6	2; 6	1; 6
5	(Lebanon) (Finland)	Karim Fawaz; Reino Nyyssönen	6; 3	4; 6	1; 6	0; 6

=== Czechoslovakia vs. Egypt ===
Czechoslovakia
4
Prague, Czechoslovakia
4–6 May 1962

Egypt
1

			1	2	3	4	5
1	(Czechoslovakia) (Egypt)	Petr Štrobl; Kamel Moubarek	6; 1	6; 4	4; 6	3; 6	6; 4
2	(Czechoslovakia) (Egypt)	Jiří Javorský; Fathi Mohammed-Ali	6; 3	6; 2	6; 4
3	(Czechoslovakia) (Egypt)	Jiří Javorský / Petr Štrobl; Ibrahim Badreldin-Sayed / Fathi Mohammed-Ali	6; 2	3; 6	6; 0	6; 3
4	(Czechoslovakia) (Egypt)	Petr Štrobl; Fathi Mohammed-Ali	4; 6	4; 6	2; 6
5	(Czechoslovakia) (Egypt)	Pavel Korda; Kamel Moubarek	6; 2	6; 1	6; 2

=== Belgium vs. Chile ===
Belgium
4
Brussels, Belgium
4–6 May 1962

Chile
1

			1	2	3	4	5
1	(Belgium) (Chile)	Eric Drossart; Patricio Apey	7; 5	6; 2	6; 2
2	(Belgium) (Chile)	Jacques Brichant; Patricio Rodríguez	6; 0	7; 5	6; 4
3	(Belgium) (Chile)	Jacques Brichant / Eric Drossart; Ernesto Aguirre / Patricio Rodríguez	4; 6	3; 6	6; 3	6; 0	6; 2
4	(Belgium) (Chile)	Claude De Gronckel; Patricio Apey	3; 6	5; 7	6; 4	7; 9
5	(Belgium) (Chile)	Eric Drossart; Patricio Rodríguez	6; 4	4; 6	7; 5	2; 6	6; 2

== Second round ==
=== Italy vs. Soviet Union ===
Italy
5
Florence, Italy
18–20 May 1962
Clay

Soviet Union
0

			1	2	3	4	5
1	(Italy) (Soviet Union)	Nicola Pietrangeli; Toomas Leius	6; 4	1; 6	6; 3	6; 1
2	(Italy) (Soviet Union)	Fausto Gardini; Sergei Likhachev	6; 0	6; 2	6; 3
3	(Italy) (Soviet Union)	Nicola Pietrangeli / Orlando Sirola; Toomas Leius / Sergei Likhachev	7; 5	6; 2	6; 3
4	(Italy) (Soviet Union)	Nicola Pietrangeli; Sergei Likhachev	0; 6	8; 6	8; 6	6; 1
5	(Italy) (Soviet Union)	Fausto Gardini; Toomas Leius	6; 4	2; 6	6; 3	6; 3

=== Hungary vs. Denmark ===
Hungary
5
Budapest, Hungary
18–20 May 1962
Clay

Denmark
0

			1	2	3	4	5
1	(Hungary) (Denmark)	András Szikszay; Carl-Edvard Hedelund	6; 2	7; 5	6; 4
2	(Hungary) (Denmark)	István Gulyás; Thorkild Larsen	6; 3	6; 0	6; 2
3	(Hungary) (Denmark)	István Gulyás / András Szikszay; Carl-Edvard Hedelund / Thorkild Larsen	6; 3	6; 2	6; 2
4	(Hungary) (Denmark)	András Szikszay; Thorkild Larsen	6; 2	6; 4	6; 4
5	(Hungary) (Denmark)	István Gulyás; Carl-Edvard Hedelund	6; 0	6; 3	6; 4

=== Poland vs. Brazil ===
Poland
0
Warsaw, Poland
18–20 May 1962

Brazil
3

			1	2	3	4	5
1	(Poland) (Brazil)	Władysław Skonecki; Carlos Alberto Fernandes	4; 6	6; 2	6; 8	4; 6
2	(Poland) (Brazil)	Wiesław Gąsiorek; José Edison Mandarino	5; 7	2; 6	2; 6
3	(Poland) (Brazil)	Wiesław Biełanowicz / Wiesław Nowicki; Ronald Barnes / Carlos Alberto Fernandes	3; 6	2; 6	3; 6
4	(Poland) (Brazil)	Wiesław Gąsiorek; Carlos Alberto Fernandes						not played
5	(Poland) (Brazil)	Władysław Skonecki; José Edison Mandarino						not played

=== Austria vs. Great Britain ===
Austria
1
Vienna, Austria
19–21 May 1962
Clay

Great Britain
4

			1	2	3	4	5
1	(Austria) (United Kingdom)	Ladislav Legenstein; Billy Knight	0; 6	6; 3	2; 6	3; 6
2	(Austria) (United Kingdom)	Franz Saiko; Mike Sangster	6; 3	3; 6	2; 6	6; 4	6; 3
3	(Austria) (United Kingdom)	Ladislav Legenstein / Franz Saiko; Billy Knight / Tony Pickard	0; 6	2; 6	6; 3	6; 4	0; 6
4	(Austria) (United Kingdom)	Franz Saiko; Billy Knight	2; 6	4; 6	7; 9
5	(Austria) (United Kingdom)	Detlef Herdy; Mike Sangster	8; 10	4; 6	6; 3	5; 7

=== France vs. South Africa ===
France
2
Stade Roland Garros, Paris, France
18–20 May 1962
Clay

South Africa
3

			1	2	3	4	5
1	(France) (South Africa)	Gérard Pilet; Cliff Drysdale	5; 7	6; 2	3; 6	10; 12
2	(France) (South Africa)	Pierre Darmon; Gordon Forbes	6; 3	6; 1	6; 2
3	(France) (South Africa)	Jean-Claude Barclay / Jacques Renavand; Gordon Forbes / Abe Segal	4; 6	1; 6	3; 6
4	(France) (South Africa)	Pierre Darmon; Cliff Drysdale	6; 4	7; 5	6; 2
5	(France) (South Africa)	Gérard Pilet; Gordon Forbes	1; 6	1; 6	7; 9

=== West Germany vs. Romania ===
West Germany
5
Hanover, West Germany
18–20 May 1962

Romania
0

			1	2	3	4	5
1	(West Germany) (Romania)	Wilhelm Bungert; Constantin Năstase	6; 1	8; 6	6; 2
2	(West Germany) (Romania)	Ingo Buding; Ion Țiriac	6; 4	6; 0	6; 3
3	(West Germany) (Romania)	Wilhelm Bungert / Christian Kuhnke; Constantin Năstase / Ion Țiriac	6; 0	6; 3	6; 4
4	(West Germany) (Romania)	Wilhelm Bungert; Ion Țiriac	6; 1	6; 2	6; 2
5	(West Germany) (Romania)	Ingo Buding; Constantin Năstase	6; 2	6; 2	6; 1

=== Finland vs. Czechoslovakia ===
Finland
0
Helsinki, Finland
18–20 May 1962

Czechoslovakia
5

			1	2	3	4	5
1	(Finland) (Czechoslovakia)	Reino Nyyssönen; Jiří Javorský	6; 8	2; 6	4; 6
2	(Finland) (Czechoslovakia)	Pekka Säilä; Pavel Korda	0; 6	7; 9	4; 6
3	(Finland) (Czechoslovakia)	Reino Nyyssönen / Sakari Salo; Jiří Javorský / Petr Štrobl	0; 6	6; 3	6; 8	4; 6
4	(Finland) (Czechoslovakia)	Pekka Säilä; Petr Štrobl	2; 6	3; 6	3; 6
5	(Finland) (Czechoslovakia)	Reino Nyyssönen; Pavel Korda	6; 4	6; 4	4; 6	1; 6	3; 6

=== Belgium vs. Sweden ===
Belgium
0
Royal Léopold Club, Brussels, Belgium
18–20 May 1962
Clay

Sweden
5

			1	2	3	4	5
1	(Belgium) (Sweden)	Jacques Brichant; Jan-Erik Lundqvist	6; 2	3; 6	4; 6	3; 6
2	(Belgium) (Sweden)	Eric Drossart; Ulf Schmidt	2; 6	4; 6	1; 6
3	(Belgium) (Sweden)	Jacques Brichant / Eric Drossart; Jan-Erik Lundqvist / Ulf Schmidt	0; 6	3; 6	1; 6
4	(Belgium) (Sweden)	Jacques Brichant; Ulf Schmidt	2; 6	6; 4	4; 6	2; 6
5	(Belgium) (Sweden)	Eric Drossart; Jan-Erik Lundqvist	1; 6	2; 6	2; 6

== Quarterfinals ==
=== Italy vs. Hungary ===
Italy
4
Brescia, Italy
15–17 June 1962
Clay

Hungary
1

			1	2	3	4	5
1	(Italy) (Hungary)	Fausto Gardini; Zoltán Katona	6; 1	6; 3	6; 1
2	(Italy) (Hungary)	Nicola Pietrangeli; István Gulyás	6; 1	4; 6	3; 6	2; 6
3	(Italy) (Hungary)	Nicola Pietrangeli / Orlando Sirola; István Gulyás / András Szikszay	1; 6	6; 2	6; 1	4; 6	6; 3
4	(Italy) (Hungary)	Nicola Pietrangeli; Zoltán Katona	6; 0	6; 2	6; 3
5	(Italy) (Hungary)	Fausto Gardini; István Gulyás	6; 1	2; 6	6; 3	6; 2

=== Great Britain vs. Brazil ===
Great Britain
4
Devonshire Park Lawn Tennis Club, Eastbourne, England
14–16 June 1962
Grass

Brazil
1

			1	2	3	4	5
1	(United Kingdom) (Brazil)	Mike Sangster; Carlos Alberto Fernandes	6; 4	6; 4	6; 4
2	(United Kingdom) (Brazil)	Billy Knight; Thomaz Koch	6; 3	6; 3	6; 1
3	(United Kingdom) (Brazil)	Billy Knight / Tony Pickard; Ronald Barnes / José Edison Mandarino	17; 19	6; 1	4; 6	7; 9
4	(United Kingdom) (Brazil)	Billy Knight; Carlos Alberto Fernandes	10; 8	6; 3	3; 6	7; 5
5	(United Kingdom) (Brazil)	Mike Sangster; José Edison Mandarino	4; 6	6; 3	6; 3	2; 6	7; 5

=== West Germany vs. South Africa ===
West Germany
2
West Berlin
15–17 June 1962

South Africa
3

			1	2	3	4	5
1	(West Germany) (South Africa)	Ingo Buding; Cliff Drysdale	4; 6	7; 5	6; 4	9; 11	6; 3
2	(West Germany) (South Africa)	Wilhelm Bungert; Gordon Forbes	6; 3	6; 8	4; 6	6; 3	6; 4
3	(West Germany) (South Africa)	Wilhelm Bungert / Christian Kuhnke; Gordon Forbes / Abe Segal	6; 4	4; 6	2; 6	6; 3	3; 6
4	(West Germany) (South Africa)	Ingo Buding; Gordon Forbes	3; 6	2; 6	7; 5	4; 6
5	(West Germany) (South Africa)	Wilhelm Bungert; Cliff Drysdale	2; 6	6; 0	6; 8	2; 6

=== Sweden vs. Czechoslovakia ===
Sweden
5
Kungliga tennishallen, Stockholm, Sweden
15–17 June 1962
Clay

Czechoslovakia
0

			1	2	3	4	5
1	(Sweden) (Czechoslovakia)	Ulf Schmidt; Pavel Korda	6; 2	6; 4	6; 2
2	(Sweden) (Czechoslovakia)	Jan-Erik Lundqvist; Jiří Javorský	6; 0	10; 8	6; 2
3	(Sweden) (Czechoslovakia)	Jan-Erik Lundqvist / Ulf Schmidt; Jiří Javorský / Petr Štrobl	8; 6	6; 3	6; 0
4	(Sweden) (Czechoslovakia)	Jan-Erik Lundqvist; Pavel Korda	6; 2	6; 0	6; 4
5	(Sweden) (Czechoslovakia)	Ulf Schmidt; Jiří Javorský	6; 4	3; 6	6; 3	6; 2

== Semifinals ==
=== Italy vs. Great Britain ===
Italy
5
Milan, Italy
13–15 July 1962
Clay

Great Britain
0

			1	2	3	4	5
1	(Italy) (United Kingdom)	Nicola Pietrangeli; Mike Sangster	6; 3	4; 6	7; 5	8; 6
2	(Italy) (United Kingdom)	Fausto Gardini; Billy Knight	6; 1	6; 8	6; 3	6; 1
3	(Italy) (United Kingdom)	Nicola Pietrangeli / Orlando Sirola; Billy Knight / Tony Pickard	6; 3	6; 4	6; 8	6; 3
4	(Italy) (United Kingdom)	Nicola Pietrangeli; Tony Pickard	8; 6	6; 0	6; 1
5	(Italy) (United Kingdom)	Fausto Gardini; Mike Sangster	6; 1	6; 3	6; 0

=== Sweden vs. South Africa ===
Sweden
4
Båstad Tennis Stadium, Båstad, Sweden
13–15 July 1962
Clay

South Africa
1

			1	2	3	4	5
1	(Sweden) (South Africa)	Ulf Schmidt; Cliff Drysdale	3; 6	2; 6	6; 3	3; 6
2	(Sweden) (South Africa)	Jan-Erik Lundqvist; Gordon Forbes	6; 2	6; 4	6; 1
3	(Sweden) (South Africa)	Jan-Erik Lundqvist / Ulf Schmidt; Cliff Drysdale / Abe Segal	6; 4	6; 2	9; 7
4	(Sweden) (South Africa)	Ulf Schmidt; Abe Segal	11; 9	6; 4	6; 1
5	(Sweden) (South Africa)	Jan-Erik Lundqvist; Cliff Drysdale	6; 4	6; 4	6; 2

== Final ==
=== Sweden vs. Italy ===
Sweden
4
Båstad Tennis Stadium, Båstad, Sweden
27–29 July 1962
Clay

Italy
1

			1	2	3	4	5
1	(Sweden) (Italy)	Ulf Schmidt; Fausto Gardini	3; 6	6; 3	5; 7	3; 6
2	(Sweden) (Italy)	Jan-Erik Lundqvist; Nicola Pietrangeli	6; 2	6; 4	6; 1
3	(Sweden) (Italy)	Jan-Erik Lundqvist / Ulf Schmidt; Nicola Pietrangeli / Orlando Sirola	6; 1	3; 6	6; 8	6; 4	9; 7
4	(Sweden) (Italy)	Jan-Erik Lundqvist; Fausto Gardini	6; 0	6; 2	6; 1
5	(Sweden) (Italy)	Ulf Schmidt; Nicola Pietrangeli	6; 1	8; 6	6; 3
