= 1961 Davis Cup America Zone =

International tennis competition

The America Zone was one of the three regional zones of the 1961 Davis Cup.

7 teams entered the America Zone, with the winner going on to compete in the Inter-Zonal Zone against the winners of the Eastern Zone and Europe Zone. The United States defeated Mexico in the final and progressed to the Inter-Zonal Zone.

== Draw ==
Quarterfinals; 29 April–1 May; 27–29 May; 28–31 July
Morocco
bye
Quebec City, Canada (clay)
Canada	2
Mexico	3
Guayaquil, Ecuador (clay)
Ecuador	5
Colombia	0
Bridgetown, Barbados (grass)
Caribbean/West Indies	0
United States	5

Semifinals; 15–17 July; 4–6 August
Casablanca, Morocco
Morocco	0
Mexico	5
St. Louis, MO, United States (clay)
Ecuador	0
United States	5

Final; 18–20 August
Cleveland, OH, United States (clay)
Mexico	2
United States	3

== Quarterfinals ==
=== Canada vs. Mexico ===
Canada
2
Civil Employees Tennis Club, Quebec City, Canada
28–31 July 1961
Clay

Mexico
3

			1	2	3	4	5
1	(Canada) (Mexico)	Robert Bédard; Mario Llamas	8; 6	6; 4	6; 0
2	(Canada) (Mexico)	François Godbout; Antonio Palafox	4; 6	6; 2	1; 6	1; 6
3	(Canada) (Mexico)	Robert Bédard / François Godbout; Rafael Osuna / Antonio Palafox	12; 10	7; 9	6; 8	4; 6
4	(Canada) (Mexico)	François Godbout; Mario Llamas	0; 6	3; 6	1; 6
5	(Canada) (Mexico)	Robert Bédard; Rafael Osuna	5; 7	6; 3	6; 1	6; 2

=== Ecuador vs. Colombia ===
Ecuador
5
Guayaquil Tennis Club, Guayaquil, Ecuador
29 April–1 May 1961
Clay

Colombia
0

			1	2	3	4	5
1	(Ecuador) (Colombia)	Miguel Olvera; William Álvarez	3; 6	6; 2	6; 3	2; 6	7; 5
2	(Ecuador) (Colombia)	Eduardo Zuleta; José Alejandro Cortes	6; 2	6; 3	6; 3
3	(Ecuador) (Colombia)	Miguel Olvera / Eduardo Zuleta; William Álvarez / José Alejandro Cortes	6; 3	6; 3	10; 8
4	(Ecuador) (Colombia)	Eduardo Zuleta; William Álvarez	6; 0	6; 8	3; 6	7; 5	6; 4
5	(Ecuador) (Colombia)	Miguel Olvera; José Alejandro Cortes	6; 4	4; 6	6; 0	6; 0

=== Caribbean/West Indies vs. United States ===
Caribbean/West Indies
0
Bridgetown, Barbados
27–29 May 1961
Grass

United States
5

			1	2	3	4	5
1	(Cricket West Indies) (United States)	Ian McDonald; Christopher Crawford	1; 6	3; 6	2; 6
2	(Cricket West Indies) (United States)	Peter Valdez; Jon Douglas	2; 6	1; 6	2; 6
3	(Cricket West Indies) (United States)	Ian McDonald / Peter Philips; Jon Douglas / Hugh Stewart	3; 6	3; 6	7; 5	3; 6
4	(Cricket West Indies) (United States)	Peter Philips; Christopher Crawford	0; 6	0; 6	2; 6
5	(Cricket West Indies) (United States)	Peter Valdez; Jon Douglas	2; 6	0; 6	1; 6

== Semifinals ==
=== Morocco vs. Mexico ===
Morocco
0
Casablanca, Morocco
4–6 August 1961

Mexico
5

			1	2	3	4	5
1	(Morocco) (Mexico)	Ahmed Douglas; Antonio Palafox	0; 6	2; 6	1; 6
2	(Morocco) (Mexico)	Lahcen Chadli; Francisco Contreras	3; 6	4; 6	3; 6
3	(Morocco) (Mexico)	Lahcen Chadli / Maurice Cohen; Rafael Osuna / Antonio Palafox	2; 6	2; 6	1; 6
4	(Morocco) (Mexico)	Ahmed Douglas; Mario Llamas	1; 6	0; 6	0; 6
5	(Morocco) (Mexico)	Lahcen Chadli; Rafael Osuna	1; 6	5; 7	5; 7

=== United States vs. Ecuador ===
United States
5
Triple A Club, St. Louis, MO, United States
15–17 July 1961
Clay

Ecuador
0

			1	2	3	4	5
1	(United States) (Ecuador)	Chuck McKinley; Miguel Olvera	6; 4	1; 6	6; 4	6; 2
2	(United States) (Ecuador)	Tut Bartzen; Eduardo Zuleta	6; 0	6; 1	6; 1
3	(United States) (Ecuador)	Chuck McKinley / Dennis Ralston; Miguel Olvera / Eduardo Zuleta	6; 1	6; 2	7; 5
4	(United States) (Ecuador)	Chuck McKinley; Eduardo Zuleta	6; 4	6; 4	1; 6	7; 5
5	(United States) (Ecuador)	Dennis Ralston; Miguel Olvera	6; 2	6; 4	6; 2

== Final ==
=== United States vs. Mexico ===
United States
3
Cleveland Skating Club, Cleveland, OH, United States
18–20 August 1961
Clay

Mexico
2

			1	2	3	4	5
1	(United States) (Mexico)	Chuck McKinley; Rafael Osuna	3; 6	3; 6	3; 6
2	(United States) (Mexico)	Tut Bartzen; Mario Llamas	4; 6	6; 4	6; 4	6; 4
3	(United States) (Mexico)	Chuck McKinley / Dennis Ralston; Rafael Osuna / Antonio Palafox	4; 6	6; 2	4; 6	3; 6
4	(United States) (Mexico)	Chuck McKinley; Mario Llamas	6; 4	7; 5	10; 8
5	(United States) (Mexico)	Tut Bartzen; Rafael Osuna	6; 3	6; 3	7; 5
