= 1961 Davis Cup Eastern Zone =

International tennis competition

The Eastern Zone was one of the three regional zones of the 1961 Davis Cup.

7 teams entered the Eastern Zone, with the winner going on to compete in the Inter-Zonal Zone against the winners of the America Zone and Europe Zone. India defeated Japan in the final and progressed to the Inter-Zonal Zone.

== Draw ==
Quarterfinals; 18–28 March
Philippines
bye
Japan	w/o
South Korea
Colombo, Ceylon (clay)
Ceylon	2
Thailand	3
Bandung, Indonesia
Indonesia	1
India	4

Semifinals; 1–24 April
Tokyo, Japan
Philippines	2
Japan	3
Lucknow, India
Thailand	0
India	5

Final; 6–8 May
New Delhi, India
Japan	1
India	4

== Quarterfinals ==
=== Ceylon vs. Thailand ===
Ceylon
2
Ceylon Lawn Tennis Association, Colombo, Ceylon
18–20 March 1961
Clay

Thailand
3

			1	2	3	4	5
1	(Dominion of Ceylon) (Thailand)	Gamini Perera; Sutiraphan Karalak	2; 6	2; 6	4; 6
2	(Dominion of Ceylon) (Thailand)	Bernard Pinto; Seri Charuchinda	6; 0	6; 3	6; 0
3	(Dominion of Ceylon) (Thailand)	Rupert Ferdinands / Bernard Pinto; Seri Charuchinda / Sutiraphan Karalak	6; 2	6; 2	2; 6	8; 6
4	(Dominion of Ceylon) (Thailand)	Bernard Pinto; Sutiraphan Karalak	4; 6	6; 1	3; 6	1; 6
5	(Dominion of Ceylon) (Thailand)	Gamini Perera; Seri Charuchinda	6; 4	4; 6	6; 8	7; 9

=== Indonesia vs. India ===
Indonesia
1
Bandung, Indonesia
26–28 March 1961

India
4

			1	2	3	4	5
1	(Indonesia) (India)	Liep Tjiauw Tan; Jaidip Mukerjea	6; 2	6; 1	2; 6	6; 4
2	(Indonesia) (India)	Itjas Sumarno; Ramanathan Krishnan	2; 6	1; 6	1; 6
3	(Indonesia) (India)	Kong-Loen Sie / Sutarjo Sugiarto; Ramanathan Krishnan / Premjit Lall	2; 6	4; 6	0; 6
4	(Indonesia) (India)	Itjas Sumarno; Jaidip Mukerjea	2; 6	1; 6	1; 6
5	(Indonesia) (India)	Sutarjo Sugiarto; Premjit Lall	2; 6	1; 6	6; 8

== Semifinals ==
=== Japan vs. Philippines ===
Japan
3
Tokyo, Japan
22–24 April 1961

Philippines
2

			1	2	3	4	5
1	(Japan) (Philippines)	Atsushi Miyagi; Raymundo Deyro	4; 6	5; 7	5; 7
2	(Japan) (Philippines)	Osamu Ishiguro; Juan-Johnson José	3; 6	2; 6	3; 6
3	(Japan) (Philippines)	Atsushi Miyagi / Masao Nagasaki; Eduardo Dungo / Juan-Johnson José	8; 6	6; 3	6; 1
4	(Japan) (Philippines)	Atsushi Miyagi; Juan-Johnson José	6; 2	1; 6	6; 1	3; 6	6; 4
5	(Japan) (Philippines)	Osamu Ishiguro; Raymundo Deyro	6; 4	6; 2	6; 4

=== India vs. Thailand ===
India
5
Lucknow, India
1–3 April 1961

Thailand
0

			1	2	3	4	5
1	(India) (Thailand)	Jaidip Mukerjea; Sutiraphan Karalak	6; 4	6; 3	6; 4
2	(India) (Thailand)	Ramanathan Krishnan; Seri Charuchinda	6; 0	6; 3	6; 1
3	(India) (Thailand)	Ramanathan Krishnan / Premjit Lall; Seri Charuchinda / Sutiraphan Karalak	6; 0	6; 2	6; 1
4	(India) (Thailand)	Jaidip Mukerjea; Seri Charuchinda	6; 1	3; 6	6; 1	7; 5
5	(India) (Thailand)	Premjit Lall; Sutiraphan Karalak	6; 1	7; 5	6; 2

== Final ==
=== India vs. Japan ===
India
4
New Delhi, India
6–8 May 1961

Japan
1

			1	2	3	4	5
1	(India) (Japan)	Jaidip Mukerjea; Atsushi Miyagi	2; 6	7; 9	6; 2	2; 6
2	(India) (Japan)	Ramanathan Krishnan; Osamu Ishiguro	4; 6	6; 3	6; 3	6; 3
3	(India) (Japan)	Ramanathan Krishnan / Premjit Lall; Atsushi Miyagi / Masao Nagasaki	6; 4	6; 3	6; 4
4	(India) (Japan)	Ramanathan Krishnan; Atsushi Miyagi	6; 4	6; 1	6; 4
5	(India) (Japan)	Akhtar Ali; Osamu Ishiguro	4; 6	6; 4	6; 0	2; 6	6; 4
