= Thomas Hallberg =

Swedish tennis player

- Country (sports): Sweden
- Residence: Stockholm, Sweden
- Born: 1 August 1940 (age 84); Stockholm, Sweden
- Plays: Right-handed

Singles
- Career record: 0–4
- Career titles: 0

Grand Slam singles results
- French Open: 2R (1962)
- US Open: 1R (1962, 1963, 1964)

Doubles
- Career record: 0–1
- Career titles: 0

Mixed doubles

Grand Slam mixed doubles results
- Wimbledon: 2R (1963)

Dag Thomas Hallberg (born 1 August 1940) is a former tennis player and administrator from Sweden.

== Tennis career ==
Hallberg represented Sweden in the 1961 Europe Zone final against Italy. In the doubles rubber he partnered with Jan-Erik Lundqvist and lost in four sets to Nicola Pietrangeli and Orlando Sirola. In the final singles rubber, he played against Fausto Gardini and lost in straight sets.

Hallberg made his Grand Slam debut in 1962 at the French Open and after receiving a bye in the first round, lost in the second round to Roy Emerson. He also played at the 1962, 1963 and 1964 US Opens, losing in the first round on each occasion.

Hallberg's one tournament victory was at the 1962 Kassel Open in Germany when he beat the Hungarian player, Istvan Sikorski, 6–2, 6–1 in the final.

Hallberg joined the International Tennis Federation in 1984 as director of men's tennis before becoming director of the Davis Cup, a position he held until his retirement in 2000.

== See also ==
- List of Sweden Davis Cup team representatives
