= Jon Douglas =

American tennis and football player (1936–2010)

Jack Douglas
- Full name: Jon Alexander Douglas
- Country (sports): United States
- Born: September 10, 1936; Hot Springs, Arkansas, US
- Died: July 27, 2010 (aged 73); Brentwood, California, US
- Height: 5 ft 10 in (178 cm)

Singles

Grand Slam singles results
- French Open: 3R (1959)
- Wimbledon: 3R (1961)
- US Open: QF (1961)

Doubles

Grand Slam doubles results
- Wimbledon: QF (1962)

Jon Alexander "Jack" Douglas (September 10, 1936 – July 27, 2010) was an amateur American tennis player and college football quarterback.

== Early life ==
Douglas was born in Hot Springs, Arkansas, the only child of Dortha and Gordon Douglas. In 1944 he and his family moved to Santa Monica, California. He graduated from Santa Monica High School, where he played football, tennis, and basketball.

== College sports ==
He attended Stanford University, where he was Stanford's first All-American in tennis in 1957, and earned the honor again in 1958, when he was runner-up in both singles and doubles competition at the NCAA Men's Tennis Championship.

Douglas was also a quarterback on Stanford's football team. He played backup to John Brodie for two years, and when Brodie graduated, became the starter for the 1957 season, leading the team to a 6–4 record.

In 1996, he was inducted into the Intercollegiate Tennis Hall of Fame in Athens, Georgia.

== Tennis career ==
After graduating from Stanford, Douglas entered top-level competitive amateur tennis. From 1960 to 1962, he was in the top ten of U.S. players. He won the Pacific Southwest Championships in 1961, defeating Roy Emerson in three sets, and reached the quarterfinals in the 1961 U.S. National Championships, losing to Mike Sangster. He won the singles title at the inaugural Philadelphia Invitational Indoor Tennis Championship in 1962, defeating Ronald Holmberg in the final in five sets.

Following his service in the U.S. Marine Corps Douglas played on the U.S. Davis Cup team in 1961 and 1962. He scored the only point for the U.S. by defeating Fausto Gardini in five sets, as they lost the 1961 Davis Cup finals to host country Italy.

== After tennis ==
Following his tennis career, Douglas founded the Jon Douglas Real Estate Company in Southern California. He was inducted into the Intercollegiate Tennis Association Hall of Fame in 1996, and became a member of the Stanford Athletic Hall of Fame in 1958. In 1995, the Jon Douglas Company merged with Prudential to form the Prudential Jon Douglas Company and that company was acquired by Coldwell Banker in September 1997.
