= Fathi Ali =

Egyptian tennis player

- Full name: Fathi Mohammed Ali
- Country (sports): Egypt
- Residence: Dreieich, Germany
- Born: 25 July 1940 (age 84); Cairo, Kingdom of Egypt
- Plays: Right-handed (one-handed backhand)

Singles

Grand Slam singles results
- Wimbledon: 1R (1960)
- US Open: 1R (1963)

Doubles

Grand Slam doubles results
- Wimbledon: Q1 (1962, 1963)

Team competitions
- Davis Cup: 8–18
Medal record
Mediterranean Games
Silver medal – second place	1963 Naples	Doubles
- Last updated on: 9 April 2020.

Fathi Mohammed Ali (born 25 July 1940) is an Egyptian former tennis player.

A silver medalist at the 1963 Mediterranean Games, he is now a tennis coach based in Dreieich, Germany. In the past, he coached the Davis Cup teams of Libya (in two stints: 1968–1973 and 1978–1980) and Kuwait (1973–1978).
