= 1961 Davis Cup =

1961 edition of the Davis Cup

Details
- Duration: 18 March – 28 December 1961
- Edition: 50th
- Teams: 42

Champion
- Winning nation: Australia

The 1961 Davis Cup was the 50th edition of the Davis Cup, the most important tournament between national teams in men's tennis. 28 teams entered the Europe Zone, 7 teams entered the Americas Zone, and 7 teams entered the Eastern Zone. Ecuador, Indonesia and Morocco made their first appearances in the tournament.

The United States defeated Mexico in the America Zone final, India defeated Japan in the Eastern Zone final, and Italy defeated Sweden in the Europe Zone final. In the Inter-Zonal Zone, the United States defeated India in the semifinal, and then Italy defeated the United States in the final. In the Challenge Round Italy were defeated by the defending champions Australia. The final was played at Kooyong Stadium in Melbourne, Australia on 26–28 December.

== America Zone ==
=== Draw ===
Quarterfinals; 29 April–1 May; 27–29 May; 28–31 July
Morocco
bye
Quebec City, Canada (clay)
Canada	2
Mexico	3
Guayaquil, Ecuador (clay)
Ecuador	5
Colombia	0
Bridgetown, Barbados (grass)
Caribbean/West Indies	0
United States	5

Semifinals; 15–17 July; 4–6 August
Casablanca, Morocco
Morocco	0
Mexico	5
St. Louis, MO, United States (clay)
Ecuador	0
United States	5

Final; 18–20 August
Cleveland, OH, United States (clay)
Mexico	2
United States	3

=== Final ===
United States vs. Mexico

United States
3
Cleveland Skating Club, Cleveland, OH, United States
18–20 August 1961
Clay

Mexico
2

			1	2	3	4	5
1	(United States) (Mexico)	Chuck McKinley; Rafael Osuna	3; 6	3; 6	3; 6
2	(United States) (Mexico)	Tut Bartzen; Mario Llamas	4; 6	6; 4	6; 4	6; 4
3	(United States) (Mexico)	Chuck McKinley / Dennis Ralston; Rafael Osuna / Antonio Palafox	4; 6	6; 2	4; 6	3; 6
4	(United States) (Mexico)	Chuck McKinley; Mario Llamas	6; 4	7; 5	10; 8
5	(United States) (Mexico)	Tut Bartzen; Rafael Osuna	6; 3	6; 3	7; 5

== Eastern Zone ==
=== Draw ===
Quarterfinals; 18–28 March
Philippines
bye
Japan	w/o
South Korea
Colombo, Ceylon (clay)
Ceylon	2
Thailand	3
Bandung, Indonesia
Indonesia	1
India	4

Semifinals; 1–24 April
Tokyo, Japan
Philippines	2
Japan	3
Lucknow, India
Thailand	0
India	5

Final; 6–8 May
New Delhi, India
Japan	1
India	4

=== Final ===
India vs. Japan

India
4
New Delhi, India
6–8 May 1961

Japan
1

			1	2	3	4	5
1	(India) (Japan)	Jaidip Mukerjea; Atsushi Miyagi	2; 6	7; 9	6; 2	2; 6
2	(India) (Japan)	Ramanathan Krishnan; Osamu Ishiguro	4; 6	6; 3	6; 3	6; 3
3	(India) (Japan)	Ramanathan Krishnan / Premjit Lall; Atsushi Miyagi / Masao Nagasaki	6; 4	6; 3	6; 4
4	(India) (Japan)	Ramanathan Krishnan; Atsushi Miyagi	6; 4	6; 1	6; 4
5	(India) (Japan)	Akhtar Ali; Osamu Ishiguro	4; 6	6; 4	6; 0	2; 6	6; 4

== Europe Zone ==
=== Draw ===
First Round; 27 April–7 May
Italy
bye
Belgium	3
Chile	2
Switzerland	2
Netherlands	3
Czechoslovakia	2
West Germany	3
Ireland	0
Poland	5
Monaco	3
Luxembourg	2
Egypt	0
Brazil	5
bye
France
Great Britain
bye
Austria	5
Norway	0
Turkey	1
Finland	4
Romania	0
South Africa	5
Yugoslavia	1
Spain	3
Israel	0
New Zealand	5
Denmark	2
Hungary	3
bye
Sweden

Second Round; 1–4 June
Brussels, Belgium (clay)
Italy	3
Belgium	2
Scheveningen, Netherlands (clay)
Netherlands	0
West Germany	5
Warsaw, Poland
Poland	4
Monaco	1
Paris, France (clay)
Brazil	1
France	4
Vienna, Austria (clay)
Great Britain	3
Austria	2
Helsinki, Finland
Finland	1
South Africa	4
Madrid, Spain (clay)
Spain	3
New Zealand	2
Budapest, Hungary (clay)
Hungary	2
Sweden	3

Quarterfinals; 10–19 June
Munich, West Germany (clay)
Italy	3
West Germany	2
Warsaw, Poland
Poland	0
France	5
Birmingham, England (grass)
Great Britain	4
South Africa	1
Madrid, Spain (clay)
Spain	1
Sweden	4

Semifinals; 21–23 July
Paris, France (clay)
Italy	4
France	1
Båstad, Sweden (clay)
Great Britain	1
Sweden	4

Final; 4–6 August
Milan, Italy (clay)
Italy	4
Sweden	1

=== Final ===
Italy vs. Sweden

Italy
4
Milan, Italy
4–6 August 1961
Clay

Sweden
1

			1	2	3	4	5
1	(Italy) (Sweden)	Fausto Gardini; Ulf Schmidt	6	4; 4	1; 6	6; 6	6; 3
2	(Italy) (Sweden)	Nicola Pietrangeli; Jan-Erik Lundqvist	2; 6	5; 7	6; 1	4; 6
3	(Italy) (Sweden)	Nicola Pietrangeli / Orlando Sirola; Thomas Hallberg / Jan-Erik Lundqvist	6; 3	3; 6	6; 3	6; 1
4	(Italy) (Sweden)	Nicola Pietrangeli; Ulf Schmidt	6; 3	6; 2	3; 6	6; 3
5	(Italy) (Sweden)	Fausto Gardini; Thomas Hallberg	6; 2	6; 1	6; 0

== Inter-Zonal Zone ==
=== Draw ===
Semifinals; 30 September–2 October
EUR	Italy
bye
New Delhi, India
AME	United States	3
EAS	India	2

Final; 13–16 October
Rome, Italy (clay)
EUR	Italy	4
AME	United States	1

=== Semifinals ===
India vs. United States

India
2
National Sports Club, New Delhi, India
30 September–2 October 1961

United States
3

			1	2	3	4	5
1	(India) (United States)	Jaidip Mukerjea; Chuck McKinley	4; 6	4; 6	7; 9
2	(India) (United States)	Ramanathan Krishnan; Whitney Reed	6; 4	6; 1	7; 5
3	(India) (United States)	Ramanathan Krishnan / Premjit Lall; Donald Dell / Chuck McKinley	7; 5	0; 6	3; 6	2; 6
4	(India) (United States)	Jaidip Mukerjea; Whitney Reed	2; 6	3; 6	3; 6
5	(India) (United States)	Ramanathan Krishnan; Chuck McKinley	6; 3	4; 6	1; 6	6; 3	6; 4

=== Final ===
Italy vs. United States

Italy
4
Foro Italico, Rome, Italy
13–16 October 1961
Clay

United States
1

			1	2	3	4	5
1	(Italy) (United States)	Fausto Gardini; Jon Douglas	6; 4	6; 4	5; 7	8; 10	0; 6
2	(Italy) (United States)	Nicola Pietrangeli; Whitney Reed	2; 6	6; 8	6; 4	6; 4	6; 4
3	(Italy) (United States)	Nicola Pietrangeli / Orlando Sirola; Donald Dell / Whitney Reed	6; 4	3; 6	6; 3	6; 2
4	(Italy) (United States)	Nicola Pietrangeli; Jon Douglas	9; 7	6; 3	6; 2
5	(Italy) (United States)	Fausto Gardini; Whitney Reed	3; 6	7; 5	3; 6	8; 6	6; 4

== Challenge Round ==
Australia vs. Italy

Australia
5
Kooyong Stadium, Melbourne, Australia
26–28 December 1961
Grass

Italy
0

			1	2	3	4	5
1	(Australia) (Italy)	Roy Emerson; Nicola Pietrangeli	8; 6	6; 4	6; 0
2	(Australia) (Italy)	Rod Laver; Orlando Sirola	6; 1	6; 4	6; 3
3	(Australia) (Italy)	Roy Emerson / Neale Fraser; Nicola Pietrangeli / Orlando Sirola	6; 2	6; 3	6; 4
4	(Australia) (Italy)	Rod Laver; Nicola Pietrangeli	6; 3	3; 6	4; 6	6; 3	8; 6
5	(Australia) (Italy)	Roy Emerson; Orlando Sirola	6; 3	6; 3	4; 6	6; 2
