= Orlando Sirola =

Italian tennis player

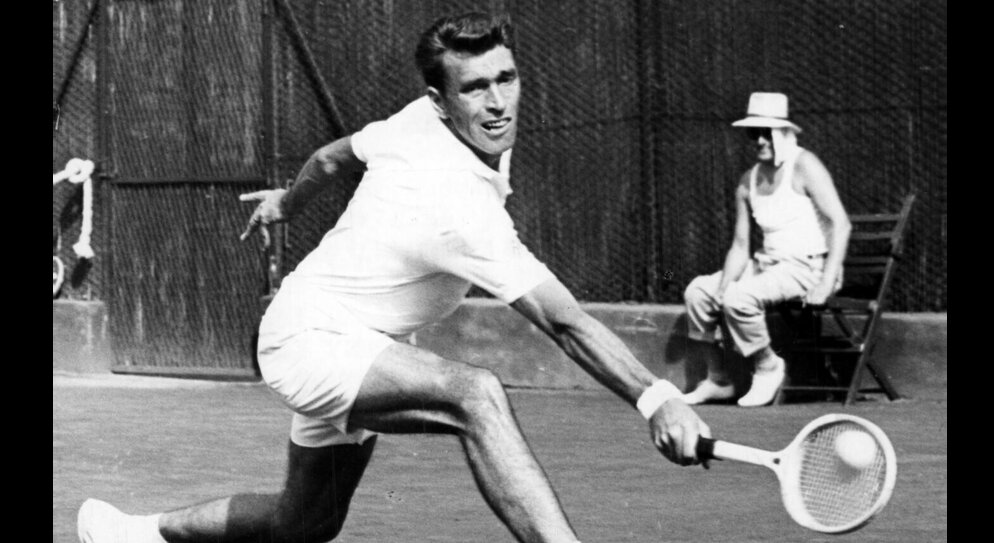
- Country (sports): Italy
- Born: 30 April 1928 Fiume, Kingdom of Italy
- Died: 13 November 1995 (aged 67) Bologna, Italy
- Turned pro: 1952 (amateur tour)
- Retired: 1963
- Plays: Right-handed (one-handed backhand)

Singles
- Career titles: 6

Grand Slam singles results
- French Open: SF (1960)
- Wimbledon: 4R (1959, 1962)

Doubles
- Career titles: 6

Grand Slam doubles results
- French Open: W (1959)
- Wimbledon: F (1956)

Mixed doubles

Grand Slam mixed doubles results
- Wimbledon: QF (1955)

Team competitions
- Davis Cup: F (1960^{Ch}, 1961^{Ch})

Orlando Sirola (30 April 1928 – 13 November 1995) was an Italian tennis player.

== Biography ==
Sirola was born in Fiume, today the Croatian city of Rijeka. He only began playing tennis at the age of 22.

In 1958 he won the singles title at the Bavarian Tennis Championships in Munich after a five-set victory in the final against Luis Ayala.

Sirola's best result in a Grand Slam singles event was at Roland Garros in 1960, where he beat #1 seed, Barry MacKay in the Quarterfinals to reach the Semifinals. He also won the Roland Garros doubles title in 1959, partnering Nicola Pietrangeli. He was a member of the Italian teams which finished runners-up to Australia in the Davis Cup in 1960 and 1961.

== Grand Slam finals ==
=== Doubles (1 title, 2 runners-up) ===
Result	Year	Championship	Surface	Partner	Opponents	Score
Loss	1955	French Championships	Clay	(Italy) Nicola Pietrangeli	(United States) Vic Seixas (United States) Tony Trabert	1–6, 6–4, 2–6, 4–6
Loss	1956	Wimbledon	Grass	(Italy) Nicola Pietrangeli	(Australia) Lew Hoad (Australia) Ken Rosewall	5–7, 2–6, 1–6
Win	1959	French Championships	Clay	(Italy) Nicola Pietrangeli	(Australia) Roy Emerson (Australia) Neale Fraser	6–3, 6–2, 14–12
