= Fausto Gardini =

Italian tennis player

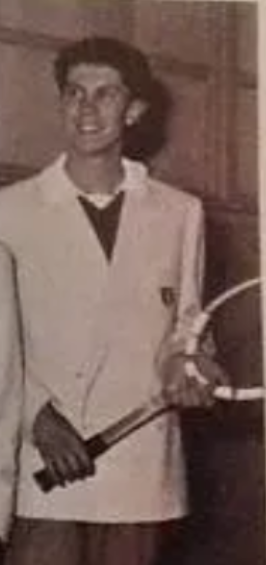
- Full name: Fausto Gardini
- Country (sports): Italy
- Born: 8 March 1930; Milan, Italy
- Died: 17 September 2008 (aged 78); Forte dei Marmi, Italy
- Turned pro: 1949 (amateur tour)
- Retired: 1965

Singles

Grand Slam singles results
- Australian Open: 2R (1953)
- French Open: QF (1953)
- Wimbledon: 4R (1951)

Team competitions
- Davis Cup: F (1961^{Ch})

Fausto Gardini (8 March 1930 – 17 September 2008) was an Italian tennis player. He was an Italian Davis Cup player and later captain. Gardini had long arms and legs, was renowned for keeping the ball in play and was very determined. "I could not help but admire Gardini because he always tried" said Ken Rosewall. This is how William McHale described Gardini "A stringy, expressive, cavorting clown, Gardini uses the crowd as his personal cheering section". Gardini made his Grand Slam debut at Roland Garros in 1949, where he lost in round three to Eric Sturgess. At Roland Garros in 1951, Gardini lost in the last 16 to Dick Savitt. At Wimbledon Gardini beat Gardnar Mulloy before losing to Frank Sedgman in the last 16. At Roland Garros in 1952, Gardini beat 17 year old Ken Rosewall and Tony Mottram before losing to Jaroslav Drobny in the last 16. At Wimbledon he lost to Straight Clark in round three. At the 1953 Australian championships, Gardini lost in round two to Ian Ayre. At Roland Garros, Gardini reached the quarter finals before losing to Drobny. At Wimbledon he lost in round one to Istvan Sikorski. The highlight of Gardini's career was when he won the title at Rome in 1955, beating Herbert Flam, Enrique Morea and Giuseppe Merlo. In the final Merlo led by two sets to one and had two championship points in the fourth set, but suffered from cramps and was forced to retire at 6–6 in the fourth set. After that, Gardini played less and concentrated on running his family's bakery business. By the early 1960s he was playing mainly in Italian tournaments and Davis Cup.
