= 1960 Davis Cup America Zone =

International tennis competition

The America Zone was one of the three regional zones of the 1960 Davis Cup.

6 teams entered the America Zone, with 3 teams each competing in the North & Central America Zone and South America Zone. The winner of each sub-zone would play against each other to determine who moved to the Inter-Zonal Zone to compete against the winners of the Eastern Zone and Europe Zone.

The United States defeated Mexico in the North & Central America Zone final, and Venezuela defeated New Zealand in the South America Zone final. In the Americas Inter-Zonal Final, the United States defeated Venezuela and progressed to the Inter-Zonal Zone.

== North & Central America Zone ==
=== Draw ===
Semifinals; 15–17 July
Mexico
bye
Quebec City, Canada (clay)
Canada	0
United States	5

Final; 6–9 August
Mexico City, Mexico (clay)
Mexico	2
United States	3

=== Semifinals ===
==== Canada vs. United States ====
Canada
0
Civil Employees Tennis Club, Quebec City, Canada
15–17 July 1960
Clay

United States
5

			1	2	3	4	5
1	(Canada) (United States)	Robert Bédard; Tut Bartzen	7; 5	6; 4	0; 6	2; 6	2; 6
2	(Canada) (United States)	Don Fontana; Barry MacKay	1; 6	3; 6	2; 6
3	(Canada) (United States)	Robert Bédard / Don Fontana; Butch Buchholz / Chuck McKinley	12; 14	3; 6	2; 6
4	(Canada) (United States)	Robert Bédard; Barry MacKay	3; 6	3; 6	6; 3	3; 6
5	(Canada) (United States)	François Godbout; Tut Bartzen	1; 6	1; 6	3; 6

=== Final ===
==== Mexico vs. United States ====
Mexico
2
Centro Deportivo Chapultepec, Mexico City, Mexico
6–9 August 1960
Clay

United States
3

			1	2	3	4	5
1	(Mexico) (United States)	Rafael Osuna; Barry MacKay	3; 6	8; 6	6; 4	6; 4
2	(Mexico) (United States)	Mario Llamas; Butch Buchholz	6; 4	5; 7	6; 8	5; 7
3	(Mexico) (United States)	Rafael Osuna / Antonio Palafox; Butch Buchholz / Chuck McKinley	6; 2	4; 6	9; 7	4; 6	5; 7
4	(Mexico) (United States)	Mario Llamas; Barry MacKay	2; 6	4; 6	6; 1	10; 12
5	(Mexico) (United States)	Esteban Reyes Jr. Chuck McKinley	2; 1					retired

== South America Zone ==
=== Draw ===
Semifinals; 16–18 July
Venezuela
bye
Port of Spain, Trinidad and Tobago (clay)
Caribbean/West Indies	0
New Zealand	5

Final; 22–24 July
Caracas, Venezuela
Venezuela	3
New Zealand	2

=== Semifinals ===
==== Caribbean/West Indies vs. New Zealand ====
Caribbean/West Indies
0
Port of Spain, Trinidad and Tobago
16–18 July 1960
Clay

New Zealand
5

			1	2	3	4	5
1	(Cricket West Indies) (New Zealand)	Peter Valdez; Mark Otway	0; 6	0; 6	0; 6
2	(Cricket West Indies) (New Zealand)	Alan Price; Lew Gerrard	6; 8	2; 6	3; 6
3	(Cricket West Indies) (New Zealand)	Alan Price / Peter Valdez; Lew Gerrard / Mark Otway	4; 6	2; 6	2; 6
4	(Cricket West Indies) (New Zealand)	Alan Price; Mark Otway	6; 8	7; 5	6; 0	3; 6	2; 6
5	(Cricket West Indies) (New Zealand)	Peter Valdez; Lew Gerrard	1; 6	1; 6	2; 6

=== Final ===
==== Venezuela vs. New Zealand ====
Venezuela
3
Caracas, Venezuela
22–24 July 1960

New Zealand
2

			1	2	3	4	5
1	(Venezuela) (New Zealand)	Marcos Gambus; Lew Gerrard	6; 4	6; 1	0; 6	1; 6	0; 6
2	(Venezuela) (New Zealand)	Isaías Pimentel; Mark Otway	6; 4	6; 8	6; 1	7; 5
3	(Venezuela) (New Zealand)	Marcos Gambus / Isaías Pimentel; Lew Gerrard / Mark Otway	6; 4	6; 3	3; 6	8; 6
4	(Venezuela) (New Zealand)	Isaías Pimentel; Lew Gerrard	6; 3	6; 4	6; 2
5	(Venezuela) (New Zealand)	Saturnino Cordoba; Mark Otway	2; 6	0; 6	1; 6

== Americas Inter-Zonal Final ==
=== United States vs. Venezuela ===
United States
5
Cleveland Skating Club, Cleveland, OH, United States
16–18 September 1960
Clay

Venezuela
0

			1	2	3	4	5
1	(United States) (Venezuela)	Tut Bartzen; Isaías Pimentel	6; 0	6; 1	6; 1
2	(United States) (Venezuela)	Barry MacKay; Marcos Gambus	6; 1	6; 1	6; 0
3	(United States) (Venezuela)	Butch Buchholz / Chuck McKinley; Marcos Gambus / Isaías Pimentel	4; 6	1; 6	5; 7
4	(United States) (Venezuela)	Tut Bartzen; Marcos Gambus	6; 1	6; 0	6; 0
5	(United States) (Venezuela)	Barry MacKay; Isaías Pimentel	6; 3	6; 3	6; 3
