= 1963 Davis Cup America Zone =

International tennis competition

The America Zone was one of the three regional zones of the 1963 Davis Cup.

7 teams entered the America Zone, with the winner going on to compete in the Inter-Zonal Zone against the winners of the Eastern Zone and Europe Zone. The United States defeated Venezuela in the final and progressed to the Inter-Zonal Zone.

== Draw ==
Quarterfinals; 13–17 June; 26–28 July
Venezuela
bye
Guayaquil, Ecuador (clay)
Ecuador	3
Caribbean/West Indies	2
Tehran, Iran
Iran	0
United States	5
Vancouver, Canada (hard)
Canada	1
Mexico	4

Semifinals; 28–30 July; 16–18 August
Caracas, Venezuela (hard)
Venezuela	3
Ecuador	1
Los Angeles, CA, United States (hard)
United States	4
Mexico	1

Final; 13–15 September
Denver, CO, United States (hard)
Venezuela	0
United States	5

== Quarterfinals ==
=== Ecuador vs. Caribbean/West Indies ===
Ecuador
3
Guayaquil Tennis Club, Guayaquil, Ecuador
15–17 June 1963
Clay

Caribbean/West Indies
2

			1	2	3	4	5
1	(Ecuador) (Cricket West Indies)	Pancho Guzmán; Lance Lumsden	6; 1	6; 3	6; 3
2	(Ecuador) (Cricket West Indies)	Eduardo Zuleta; Peter Valdez	6; 4	6; 3	6; 1
3	(Ecuador) (Cricket West Indies)	Pancho Guzmán / Eduardo Zuleta; Lance Lumsden / Peter Valdez	4; 6	6; 3	4; 6	5; 7
4	(Ecuador) (Cricket West Indies)	Eduardo Zuleta; Lance Lumsden	6; 1	6; 4	6; 1
5	(Ecuador) (Cricket West Indies)	Pancho Guzmán; Peter Valdez	4; 6	5; 7	7; 9

=== Iran vs. United States ===
Iran
0
Imperial Tennis Club, Tehran, Iran
13–16 June 1963

United States
5

			1	2	3	4	5
1	(Iran) (United States)	Reza Akbari; Gene Scott	4; 6	1; 6	0; 6
2	(Iran) (United States)	Taghi Akbari; Allen Fox	2; 6	2; 6	2; 6
3	(Iran) (United States)	Reza Akbari / Taghi Akbari; Donald Dell / Gene Scott	0; 6	1; 6	4; 6
4	(Iran) (United States)	Reza Akbari; Allen Fox	1; 6	0; 6	1; 6
5	(Iran) (United States)	Taghi Akbari; Donald Dell	3; 6	4; 6	4; 6

=== Canada vs. Mexico ===
Canada
1
Vancouver Lawn Tennis Club, Vancouver, Canada
26–28 July 1963
Hard

Mexico
4

			1	2	3	4	5
1	(Canada) (Mexico)	François Godbout; Rafael Osuna	3; 6	1; 6	2; 6
2	(Canada) (Mexico)	Henry Fauquier; Antonio Palafox	7; 9	4; 6	1; 6
3	(Canada) (Mexico)	Keith Carpenter / Henry Fauquier; Rafael Osuna / Antonio Palafox	3; 6	5; 7	4; 6
4	(Canada) (Mexico)	François Godbout; Antonio Palafox	3; 6	3; 6	1; 6
5	(Canada) (Mexico)	Keith Carpenter; Juan Arredondo	6; 2	6; 3	3; 6	1; 6	6; 3

== Semifinals ==
=== Venezuela vs. Ecuador ===
Venezuela
3
Altamira Tennis Club, Caracas, Venezuela
28–30 July 1963
Hard

Ecuador
1

			1	2	3	4	5
1	(Venezuela) (Ecuador)	Juan Notz; Eduardo Zuleta	3; 6	3; 6	4; 6
2	(Venezuela) (Ecuador)	Isaías Pimentel; Pancho Guzmán	6; 2	6; 1	6; 0
3	(Venezuela) (Ecuador)	Juan Notz / Isaías Pimentel; Pancho Guzmán / Eduardo Zuleta	6; 3	6; 4	6; 2
4	(Venezuela) (Ecuador)	Isaías Pimentel; Eduardo Zuleta	6; 3	6; 2	6; 1
5	(Venezuela) (Ecuador)	Juan Notz; Pancho Guzmán	6; 0	3; 6	3; 6	7; 5		not completed

=== United States vs. Mexico ===
United States
4
Los Angeles Tennis Club, Los Angeles, CA, United States
16–18 August 1963
Hard

Mexico
1

			1	2	3	4	5
1	(United States) (Mexico)	Chuck McKinley; Rafael Osuna	2; 6	6; 3	2; 6	6; 2	3; 6
2	(United States) (Mexico)	Dennis Ralston; Antonio Palafox	6; 1	6; 4	3; 6	6; 3
3	(United States) (Mexico)	Chuck McKinley / Dennis Ralston; Rafael Osuna / Antonio Palafox	6; 1	6; 3	8; 6
4	(United States) (Mexico)	Dennis Ralston; Rafael Osuna	6; 1	6; 3	7; 5
5	(United States) (Mexico)	Chuck McKinley; Antonio Palafox	6; 4	6; 4	4; 6	6; 3

== Final ==
=== United States vs. Venezuela ===
United States
5
Cherry Hills Country Club, Denver, CO, United States
13–15 September 1963
Hard

Venezuela
0

			1	2	3	4	5
1	(United States) (Venezuela)	Dennis Ralston; Orlando Bracamonte	6; 2	6; 1	6; 2
2	(United States) (Venezuela)	Marty Riessen; Isaías Pimentel	8; 6	6; 4	6; 4
3	(United States) (Venezuela)	Dennis Ralston / Marty Riessen; Orlando Bracamonte / Isaías Pimentel	7; 5	8; 6	6; 3
4	(United States) (Venezuela)	Arthur Ashe; Orlando Bracamonte	6; 1	6; 1	6; 0
5	(United States) (Venezuela)	Dennis Ralston; Isaías Pimentel	18; 16	9; 7	6; 4
