= 1963 Davis Cup Europe Zone =

Tennis tournament regional zone

The Europe Zone was one of the three regional zones of the 1963 Davis Cup.

32 teams entered the Europe Zone, with the winner going on to compete in the Inter-Zonal Zone against the winners of the America Zone and Eastern Zone. Great Britain defeated Sweden in the final and progressed to the Inter-Zonal Zone.

== Draw ==
Preliminary round 12–22 April
Istanbul, Turkey
Turkey | 1
Israel | 4
Estoril, Portugal (clay)
Portugal | 3
Luxembourg | 2
Beirut, Lebanon (clay)
Lebanon | 0
Egypt | 5
Dublin, Ireland
Ireland | 2
Greece | 3

Semifinals

Final

First Round; 3–5 May
Sweden
bye
Rhodesia | 4
Netherlands | 1
Yugoslavia | 5
Monaco | 0
Austria | 5
Israel | 0
South Africa
bye
Romania | 5
Switzerland | 0
Denmark | 4
Czechoslovakia | 1
Norway | 5
Portugal | 0
Egypt | 0
Chile | 5
Soviet Union | 5
Finland | 0
Hungary | 2
Belgium | 3
bye
Great Britain
Greece | 2
Brazil | 3
Poland | 0
France | 5
Spain | 3
West Germany | 2
bye
Italy

Second Round; 24 May–4 June
Stockholm, Sweden (clay)
Sweden | 3
Rhodesia | 2
Zagreb, Yugoslavia
Yugoslavia | 5
Austria | 0
Bucharest, Romania (clay)
South Africa | 3
Romania | 2
Copenhagen, Denmark (clay)
Denmark | 4
Norway | 1
Moscow, Soviet Union
Chile | 1
Soviet Union | 4
Brussels, Belgium (clay)
Belgium | 0
Great Britain | 5
Paris, France (clay)
Brazil | 1
France | 4
Barcelona, Spain (clay)
Spain | 4
Italy | 1

Quarterfinals; 13–16 June
Stockholm, Sweden (clay)
Sweden | 4
Yugoslavia | 1
Copenhagen, Denmark (clay)
South Africa | 4
Denmark | 1
Eastbourne, England (grass)
Soviet Union | 1
Great Britain | 4
Barcelona, Spain (clay)
France | 1
Spain | 4

Semifinals; 18–21 July
Båstad, Sweden (clay)
Sweden | 5
South Africa | 0
Bristol, England (grass)
Great Britain | 4
Spain | 1

Final; 1–5 August
Wimbledon, England (grass)
Sweden | 2
Great Britain | 3

== Preliminary round ==
=== Turkey vs. Israel ===
Turkey
1
Istanbul, Turkey
19–21 April 1963

Israel
4

| | | | 1 | 2 | 3 | 4 | 5 |
|---|---|---|---|---|---|---|---|
| 1 | (Turkey) (Israel) | Ziya Kipkizilorenli; Eleazar Davidman | 2; 6 | 1; 6 | 1; 6 |
| 2 | (Turkey) (Israel) | Nazmi Bari; Gabriel Dubitzky | 3; 6 | 6; 2 | 6; 1 | 6; 1 |
| 3 | (Turkey) (Israel) | Engin Balas / Nazmi Bari; Eleazar Davidman / Gabriel Dubitzky | 2; 6 | 3; 6 | 3; 6 |
| 4 | (Turkey) (Israel) | Ziya Kipkizilorenli; Gabriel Dubitzky | 5; 7 | 6; 8 | 6; 8 |
| 5 | (Turkey) (Israel) | Nazmi Bari; Eleazar Davidman | 3; 6 | 6; 1 | 4; 6 | 6; 3 | 3; 6 |

=== Portugal vs. Luxembourg ===
Portugal
3
Clube de Ténis do Estoril, Estoril, Portugal
12–15 April 1963
Clay

Luxembourg
2

| | | | 1 | 2 | 3 | 4 | 5 |
|---|---|---|---|---|---|---|---|
| 1 | (Portugal) (Luxembourg) | David Cohen; Joseph Offenheim | 6; 0 | 6; 4 | 4; 6 | 6; 3 |
| 2 | (Portugal) (Luxembourg) | Alfredo Vaz Pinto; Frank Baden | 6; 4 | 2; 6 | 7; 5 | 7; 5 |
| 3 | (Portugal) (Luxembourg) | Antonio Azevedo Gomes / Manuel Dinis; Frank Baden / Gaston Wampach | 5; 7 | 5; 7 | 5; 7 |
| 4 | (Portugal) (Luxembourg) | David Cohen; Frank Baden | 3; 6 | 4; 6 | 2; 6 |
| 5 | (Portugal) (Luxembourg) | Alfredo Vaz Pinto; Joseph Offenheim | 6; 2 | 6; 0 | 6; 1 |

=== Lebanon vs. Egypt ===
Lebanon
0
Yarzeh Club, Beirut, Lebanon
13–15 April 1963
Clay

Egypt
5

| | | | 1 | 2 | 3 | 4 | 5 |
|---|---|---|---|---|---|---|---|
| 1 | (Lebanon) (Egypt) | Édouard Samuel; Saeed Mohammed-Mabrouk | 1; 6 | 2; 6 | 4; 6 |
| 2 | (Lebanon) (Egypt) | Karim Fawaz; Fathi Mohammed-Ali | 6; 1 | 1; 6 | 2; 6 | 2; 6 |
| 3 | (Lebanon) (Egypt) | Elie Attieh / Karim Fawaz; Fathi Mohammed-Ali / Saeed Mohammed-Mabrouk | 1; 6 | 2; 6 | 0; 6 |
| 4 | (Lebanon) (Egypt) | Édouard Samuel; Fathi Mohammed-Ali | 0; 6 | 2; 6 | 4; 6 |
| 5 | (Lebanon) (Egypt) | Karim Fawaz; Saeed Mohammed-Mabrouk | 0; 6 | 3; 6 | 6; 2 | 1; 6 |

=== Ireland vs. Greece ===
Ireland
2
Dublin, Ireland
19–22 April 1922

Greece
3

| | | | 1 | 2 | 3 | 4 | 5 |
|---|---|---|---|---|---|---|---|
| 1 | (Republic of Ireland) (Greece) | Derek Arthurs; Nicholas Kalogeropoulos | 6; 1 | 5; 7 | 4; 6 | 6; 4 | 4; 6 |
| 2 | (Republic of Ireland) (Greece) | Peter Jackson; Nikolaos Kalyvas | 2; 6 | 5; 7 | 6; 4 | 1; 6 |
| 3 | (Republic of Ireland) (Greece) | Derek Arthurs / Michael Hickey; Nicholas Kalogeropoulos / Dimitrios Kanellopoulos | 3; 6 | 6; 2 | 6; 3 | 3; 6 | 6; 1 |
| 4 | (Republic of Ireland) (Greece) | Derek Arthurs; Nikolaos Kalyvas | 6; 4 | 3; 6 | 1; 6 | 6; 2 | 6; 3 |
| 5 | (Republic of Ireland) (Greece) | Michael Hickey; Nicholas Kalogeropoulos | 0; 6 | 3; 6 | 2; 6 |

== First round ==
=== Netherlands vs. Rhodesia ===
Netherlands
1
Scheveningen, Netherlands
3–5 May 1963
Clay

Rhodesia
4

| | | | 1 | 2 | 3 | 4 | 5 |
|---|---|---|---|---|---|---|---|
| 1 | (Netherlands) (Southern Rhodesia) | Pieter van Eijsden; Adrian Bey | 3; 6 | 9; 7 | 6; 3 | 6; 3 |
| 2 | (Netherlands) (Southern Rhodesia) | Willem Maris; Frank Saloman | 3; 6 | 1; 6 | 3; 6 |
| 3 | (Netherlands) (Southern Rhodesia) | Pieter van Eijsden / Willem Maris; Adrian Bey / Frank Saloman | 3; 6 | 3; 6 | 3; 6 |
| 4 | (Netherlands) (Southern Rhodesia) | Willem Maris; Adrian Bey | 6; 3 | 6; 3 | 6; 8 | 4; 6 | 4; 6 |
| 5 | (Netherlands) (Southern Rhodesia) | Pieter van Eijsden; Frank Saloman | 6; 3 | 3; 6 | 6; 1 | 3; 6 | 3; 6 |

=== Yugoslavia vs. Monaco ===
Yugoslavia
5
Split, Yugoslavia
3–5 May 1963

Monaco
0

| | | | 1 | 2 | 3 | 4 | 5 |
|---|---|---|---|---|---|---|---|
| 1 | (Socialist Federal Republic of Yugoslavia) (Monaco) | Nikola Pilić; Roland Borghini | 6; 2 | 6; 2 | 7; 5 |
| 2 | (Socialist Federal Republic of Yugoslavia) (Monaco) | Boro Jovanović; Adrien Viviani | 6; 1 | 6; 1 | 6; 1 |
| 3 | (Socialist Federal Republic of Yugoslavia) (Monaco) | Boro Jovanović / Nikola Pilić; Roland Borghini / Adrien Viviani | 6; 2 | 6; 4 | 6; 2 |
| 4 | (Socialist Federal Republic of Yugoslavia) (Monaco) | Srdjan Jelić; Roland Borghini | 6; 2 | 5; 7 | 6; 2 | 6; 3 |
| 5 | (Socialist Federal Republic of Yugoslavia) (Monaco) | Vladimir Presečki; Adrien Viviani | 6; 3 | 6; 3 | 6; 3 |

=== Austria vs. Israel ===
Austria
5
Vienna, Austria
3–5 May 1963

Israel
0

| | | | 1 | 2 | 3 | 4 | 5 |
|---|---|---|---|---|---|---|---|
| 1 | (Austria) (Israel) | Franz Hainka; Gabriel Dubitzky | 6; 2 | 6; 0 | 6; 0 |
| 2 | (Austria) (Israel) | Detlef Herdy; Eleazar Davidman | 6; 1 | 3; 6 | 6; 2 | 4; 6 | 6; 2 |
| 3 | (Austria) (Israel) | Detlef Herdy / Peter Pokorny; Eleazar Davidman / Gabriel Dubitzky | 0; 6 | 6; 3 | 10; 8 | 6; 1 |
| 4 | (Austria) (Israel) | Peter Pokorny; Gabriel Dubitzky | 6; 4 | 6; 1 | 6; 2 |
| 5 | (Austria) (Israel) | Franz Hainka; Eleazar Davidman | 6; 4 | 6; 1 | 6; 3 |

=== Romania vs. Switzerland ===
Romania
5
Bucharest, Romania
3–5 May 1963
Clay

Switzerland
0

| | | | 1 | 2 | 3 | 4 | 5 |
|---|---|---|---|---|---|---|---|
| 1 | (Romania) (Switzerland) | Ion Țiriac; Paul Blondel | 6; 1 | 6; 1 | 6; 1 |
| 2 | (Romania) (Switzerland) | Alexandru Bardan; Bruno Schweizer | 3; 6 | 4; 6 | 6; 3 | 6; 3 | 6; 0 |
| 3 | (Romania) (Switzerland) | Petre Mărmureanu / Ion Țiriac; Bernard Auberson / Paul Blondel | 6; 2 | 7; 5 | 6; 3 |
| 4 | (Romania) (Switzerland) | Ion Țiriac; Bruno Schweizer | 6; 3 | 6; 4 | 6; 1 |
| 5 | (Romania) (Switzerland) | Alexandru Bardan; Paul Blondel | 6; 2 | 6; 2 | 6; 2 |

=== Denmark vs. Czechoslovakia ===
Denmark
4
Copenhagen, Denmark
3–5 May 1963
Clay

Czechoslovakia
1

| | | | 1 | 2 | 3 | 4 | 5 |
|---|---|---|---|---|---|---|---|
| 1 | (Denmark) (Czechoslovakia) | Jørgen Ulrich; Jiří Javorský | 6; 4 | 6; 1 | 8; 6 |
| 2 | (Denmark) (Czechoslovakia) | Jan Leschly; Petr Štrobl | 6; 2 | 6; 4 | 6; 1 |
| 3 | (Denmark) (Czechoslovakia) | Jan Leschly / Jørgen Ulrich; Jiří Javorský / Petr Štrobl | 4; 6 | 4; 6 | 4; 6 |
| 4 | (Denmark) (Czechoslovakia) | Jørgen Ulrich; Petr Štrobl | 6; 1 | 6; 3 | 6; 3 |
| 5 | (Denmark) (Czechoslovakia) | Jan Leschly; Štěpán Koudelka | 9; 7 | 6; 1 | 6; 2 |

=== Portugal vs. Norway ===
Portugal
0
Clube de Ténis do Estoril, Estoril, Portugal
3–5 May 1963
Clay

Norway
5

| | | | 1 | 2 | 3 | 4 | 5 |
|---|---|---|---|---|---|---|---|
| 1 | (Portugal) (Norway) | Antonio Azevedo Gomes; Gunnar Høst Sjøwall | 3; 6 | 6; 4 | 4; 6 | 3; 6 |
| 2 | (Portugal) (Norway) | Alfredo Vaz Pinto; Finn Søhol | 5; 7 | 4; 6 | 3; 6 |
| 3 | (Portugal) (Norway) | Manuel Dinis / João Roquette; Per Hegna / Gunnar Høst Sjøwall | 9; 7 | 0; 6 | 2; 6 | 2; 6 |
| 4 | (Portugal) (Norway) | Alfredo Vaz Pinto; Gunnar Høst Sjøwall | 4; 6 | 4; 6 | 4; 6 |
| 5 | (Portugal) (Norway) | Antonio Azevedo Gomes; Finn Søhol | 3; 6 | 6; 8 | 2; 6 |

=== Egypt vs. Chile ===
Egypt
0
Cairo, Egypt
3–5 May 1963

Chile
5

| | | | 1 | 2 | 3 | 4 | 5 |
|---|---|---|---|---|---|---|---|---|
| 1 | (Egypt) (Chile) | Ismail El Shafei; Ernesto Aguirre | 1; 6 | 4; 6 | 6; 2 | 6; 3 | 6; 8 |
| 2 | (Egypt) (Chile) | Fathi Mohammed-Ali; Patricio Rodríguez | 3; 6 | 4; 6 | 4; 6 |
| 3 | (Egypt) (Chile) | Ismail El Shafei / Fathi Mohammed-Ali; Ernesto Aguirre / Jaime Pinto Bravo | 4; 6 | 2; 6 | 1; 6 |
| 4 | (Egypt) (Chile) | Ismail El Shafei; Patricio Rodríguez | 0; 6 | 2; 6 | 2; 6 |
| 5 | (Egypt) (Chile) | Fathi Mohammed-Ali; Ernesto Aguirre | 2; 6 | 2; 6 | | | | retired |

=== Finland vs. Soviet Union ===
Finland
0
Helsinki, Finland
3–5 May 1963

Soviet Union
5

| | | | 1 | 2 | 3 | 4 | 5 |
|---|---|---|---|---|---|---|---|
| 1 | (Finland) (Soviet Union) | Pekka Petersen-Dyggve; Mikhail Mozer | 3; 6 | 1; 6 | 4; 6 |
| 2 | (Finland) (Soviet Union) | Tapio Jokinen; Toomas Leius | 0; 6 | 3; 6 | 2; 6 |
| 3 | (Finland) (Soviet Union) | Matti Kinnunen / Sakari Salo; Toomas Leius / Sergei Likhachev | 1; 6 | 4; 6 | 0; 6 |
| 4 | (Finland) (Soviet Union) | Pekka Petersen-Dyggve; Toomas Leius | 5; 7 | 0; 6 | 2; 6 |
| 5 | (Finland) (Soviet Union) | Tapio Jokinen; Mikhail Mozer | 4; 6 | 4; 6 | 2; 6 |

=== Hungary vs. Belgium ===
Hungary
2
Budapest, Hungary
3–5 May 1963

Belgium
3

| | | | 1 | 2 | 3 | 4 | 5 |
|---|---|---|---|---|---|---|---|
| 1 | (Hungary) (Belgium) | István Gulyás; Jacques Brichant | 6; 2 | 6; 1 | 6; 2 |
| 2 | (Hungary) (Belgium) | Ferenc Komáromy; Eric Drossart | 6; 8 | 7; 9 | 4; 6 |
| 3 | (Hungary) (Belgium) | István Gulyás / András Szikszay; Jacques Brichant / Eric Drossart | 1; 6 | 3; 6 | 6; 1 | 3; 6 |
| 4 | (Hungary) (Belgium) | Ferenc Komáromy; Jacques Brichant | 3; 6 | 6; 8 | 2; 6 |
| 5 | (Hungary) (Belgium) | István Gulyás; Eric Drossart | 6; 0 | 6; 2 | 6; 1 |

=== Greece vs. Brazil ===
Greece
2
Athens, Greece
3–5 May 1963

Brazil
3

| | | | 1 | 2 | 3 | 4 | 5 |
|---|---|---|---|---|---|---|---|---|
| 1 | (Greece) (Brazil) | Nikolaos Kalyvas; José Edison Mandarino | 1; 6 | 7; 9 | 1; 6 |
| 2 | (Greece) (Brazil) | Nicholas Kalogeropoulos; Ronald Barnes | 6; 4 | 0; 6 | 5; 7 | 2; 6 |
| 3 | (Greece) (Brazil) | Nicholas Kalogeropoulos / Nikolaos Kalyvas; Ronald Barnes / José Edison Mandarino | | | | | | w/o |
| 4 | (Greece) (Brazil) | Nikolaos Kalyvas; Ronald Barnes | 4; 6 | 6; 1 | 6; 3 | 1; 6 | 6; 4 |
| 5 | (Greece) (Brazil) | Nicholas Kalogeropoulos; José Edison Mandarino | 1; 6 | 1; 6 | 3; 6 |

=== France vs. Poland ===
France
5
Stade Roland Garros, Paris, France
3–5 May 1963
Clay

Poland
0

| | | | 1 | 2 | 3 | 4 | 5 |
|---|---|---|---|---|---|---|---|
| 1 | (France) (Poland) | Jean-Claude Barclay; Wiesław Biełanowicz | 6; 1 | 6; 0 | 6; 2 |
| 2 | (France) (Poland) | Pierre Darmon; Stanisław Szczukiewicz | 6; 0 | 6; 1 | 6; 1 |
| 3 | (France) (Poland) | Patrice Beust / Daniel Contet; Wiesław Biełanowicz / Stanisław Szczukiewicz | 6; 2 | 6; 3 | 6; 2 |
| 4 | (France) (Poland) | Jean-Claude Barclay; Stanisław Szczukiewicz | 6; 4 | 6; 2 | 6; 3 |
| 5 | (France) (Poland) | Pierre Darmon; Wiesław Biełanowicz | 6; 0 | 6; 3 | 6; 1 |

=== West Germany vs. Spain ===
West Germany
2
Cologne, West Germany
3–5 May 1963

Spain
3

| | | | 1 | 2 | 3 | 4 | 5 |
|---|---|---|---|---|---|---|---|
| 1 | (West Germany) (Spain) | Wilhelm Bungert; Manuel Santana | 7; 9 | 6; 8 | 3; 6 |
| 2 | (West Germany) (Spain) | Christian Kuhnke; Juan Manuel Couder | 6; 4 | 6; 4 | 8; 6 |
| 3 | (West Germany) (Spain) | Wilhelm Bungert / Christian Kuhnke; Alberto Arilla / José Luis Arilla | 6; 0 | 6; 4 | 3; 6 | 6; 3 |
| 4 | (West Germany) (Spain) | Christian Kuhnke; Manuel Santana | 2; 6 | 4; 6 | 0; 6 |
| 5 | (West Germany) (Spain) | Wilhelm Bungert; Juan Manuel Couder | 6; 3 | 6; 4 | 3; 6 | 5; 7 | 3; 6 |

== Second round ==
=== Sweden vs. Rhodesia ===
Sweden
3
Kungliga tennishallen, Stockholm, Sweden
29–31 May 1963
Clay

Rhodesia
2

| | | | 1 | 2 | 3 | 4 | 5 |
|---|---|---|---|---|---|---|---|
| 1 | (Sweden) (Southern Rhodesia) | Jan-Erik Lundqvist; Adrian Bey | 6; 3 | 5; 7 | 6; 0 | 5; 7 | 5; 7 |
| 2 | (Sweden) (Southern Rhodesia) | Ulf Schmidt; Frank Saloman | 6; 3 | 6; 1 | 6; 2 |
| 3 | (Sweden) (Southern Rhodesia) | Jan-Erik Lundqvist / Ulf Schmidt; Adrian Bey / Frank Saloman | 6; 3 | 9; 7 | 6; 1 |
| 4 | (Sweden) (Southern Rhodesia) | Ulf Schmidt; Adrian Bey | 6; 4 | 6; 0 | 6; 4 |
| 5 | (Sweden) (Southern Rhodesia) | Jan-Erik Lundqvist; Frank Saloman | 6; 1 | 1; 6 | 2; 6 | 2; 6 |

=== Yugoslavia vs. Austria ===
Yugoslavia
5
Zagreb, Yugoslavia
31 May–2 June 1963

Austria
0

| | | | 1 | 2 | 3 | 4 | 5 |
|---|---|---|---|---|---|---|---|
| 1 | (Socialist Federal Republic of Yugoslavia) (Austria) | Nikola Pilić; Detlef Herdy | 6; 3 | 6; 3 | 6; 2 |
| 2 | (Socialist Federal Republic of Yugoslavia) (Austria) | Boro Jovanović; Franz Hainka | 6; 3 | 6; 3 | 6; 2 |
| 3 | (Socialist Federal Republic of Yugoslavia) (Austria) | Boro Jovanović / Nikola Pilić; Detlef Herdy / Peter Pokorny | 6; 2 | 7; 5 | 6; 4 |
| 4 | (Socialist Federal Republic of Yugoslavia) (Austria) | Vladimir Presečki; Detlef Herdy | 6; 2 | 2; 6 | 4; 6 | 6; 3 | 7; 5 |
| 5 | (Socialist Federal Republic of Yugoslavia) (Austria) | Srdjan Jelić; Dieter Schultheiss | 6; 4 | 7; 5 | 6; 4 |

=== Romania vs. South Africa ===
Romania
2
Bucharest, Romania
31 May–2 June 1963
Clay

South Africa
3

| | | | 1 | 2 | 3 | 4 | 5 |
|---|---|---|---|---|---|---|---|
| 1 | (Romania) (South Africa) | Ion Țiriac; Gordon Forbes | 6; 4 | 5; 7 | 7; 5 | 6; 4 |
| 2 | (Romania) (South Africa) | Alexandru Bardan; Abe Segal | 4; 6 | 3; 6 | 4; 6 |
| 3 | (Romania) (South Africa) | Alexandru Bardan / Ion Țiriac; Gordon Forbes / Abe Segal | 2; 6 | 9; 7 | 2; 6 | 2; 6 |
| 4 | (Romania) (South Africa) | Alexandru Bardan; Gordon Forbes | 2; 6 | 4; 6 | 0; 6 |
| 5 | (Romania) (South Africa) | Ion Țiriac; Abe Segal | 6; 1 | 13; 11 | 6; 3 |

=== Denmark vs. Norway ===
Denmark
4
Copenhagen, Denmark
24–26 May 1963
Clay

Norway
1

| | | | 1 | 2 | 3 | 4 | 5 |
|---|---|---|---|---|---|---|---|
| 1 | (Denmark) (Norway) | Jørgen Ulrich; Per Hegna | 7; 5 | 2; 6 | 6; 2 | 6; 3 |
| 2 | (Denmark) (Norway) | Jan Leschly; Gunnar Høst Sjøwall | 6; 3 | 6; 2 | 6; 3 |
| 3 | (Denmark) (Norway) | Jan Leschly / Jørgen Ulrich; Per Hegna / Gunnar Høst Sjøwall | 11; 9 | 6; 2 | 6; 4 |
| 4 | (Denmark) (Norway) | Jørgen Ulrich; Gunnar Høst Sjøwall | 2; 6 | 2; 6 | 4; 6 |
| 5 | (Denmark) (Norway) | Carl-Edvard Hedelund; Per Hegna | 6; 1 | 6; 3 | 6; 4 |

=== Soviet Union vs. Chile ===
Soviet Union
4
Moscow, Soviet Union
31 May–2 June 1963

Chile
1

| | | | 1 | 2 | 3 | 4 | 5 |
|---|---|---|---|---|---|---|---|
| 1 | (Soviet Union) (Chile) | Toomas Leius; Patricio Rodríguez | 7; 9 | 0; 6 | 7; 9 |
| 2 | (Soviet Union) (Chile) | Mikhail Mozer; Ernesto Aguirre | 7; 9 | 3; 6 | 6; 2 | 6; 4 | 6; 4 |
| 3 | (Soviet Union) (Chile) | Toomas Leius / Sergei Likhachev; Ernesto Aguirre / Patricio Rodríguez | 4; 6 | 6; 0 | 1; 6 | 7; 5 | 6; 2 |
| 4 | (Soviet Union) (Chile) | Toomas Leius; Ernesto Aguirre | 6; 3 | 6; 3 | 6; 4 |
| 5 | (Soviet Union) (Chile) | Mikhail Mozer; Jaime Pinto Bravo | 3; 6 | 6; 1 | 7; 5 | 6; 4 |

=== Belgium vs. Great Britain ===
Belgium
0
Brussels, Belgium
28–30 May 1963
Clay

Great Britain
5

| | | | 1 | 2 | 3 | 4 | 5 |
|---|---|---|---|---|---|---|---|
| 1 | (Belgium) (United Kingdom) | Jacques Brichant; Billy Knight | 3; 6 | 2; 6 | 8; 6 | 2; 6 |
| 2 | (Belgium) (United Kingdom) | Eric Drossart; Mike Sangster | 6; 8 | 5; 7 | 4; 6 |
| 3 | (Belgium) (United Kingdom) | Jacques Brichant / Eric Drossart; Tony Pickard / Bobby Wilson | 8; 6 | 6; 2 | 3; 6 | 5; 7 | 9; 11 |
| 4 | (Belgium) (United Kingdom) | Eric Drossart; Billy Knight | 0; 6 | 3; 6 | 6; 3 | 4; 6 |
| 5 | (Belgium) (United Kingdom) | Jacques Brichant; Mike Sangster | 6; 4 | 4; 6 | 1; 6 | 2; 6 |

=== France vs. Brazil ===
France
4
Stade Roland Garros, Paris, France
1–3 June 1963
Clay

Brazil
1

| | | | 1 | 2 | 3 | 4 | 5 |
|---|---|---|---|---|---|---|---|
| 1 | (France) (Brazil) | Pierre Darmon; José Edison Mandarino | 6; 4 | 6; 2 | 6; 4 |
| 2 | (France) (Brazil) | Jean-Claude Barclay; Ronald Barnes | 3; 6 | 6; 8 | 2; 6 |
| 3 | (France) (Brazil) | Patrice Beust / Daniel Contet; Ronald Barnes / Carlos Alberto Fernandes | 2; 6 | 12; 10 | 6; 2 | 6; 2 |
| 4 | (France) (Brazil) | Jean-Claude Barclay; José Edison Mandarino | 3; 6 | 6; 2 | 6; 0 | 6; 4 |
| 5 | (France) (Brazil) | Pierre Darmon; Ronald Barnes | 6; 3 | 6; 4 | 6; 1 |

=== Spain vs. Italy ===
Spain
4
Real Club de Tenis, Barcelona, Spain
31 May–4 June 1963
Clay

Italy
1

| | | | 1 | 2 | 3 | 4 | 5 |
|---|---|---|---|---|---|---|---|
| 1 | (Spain) (Italy) | Manuel Santana; Nicola Pietrangeli | 4; 6 | 4; 6 | 6; 3 | 6; 8 |
| 2 | (Spain) (Italy) | Juan Manuel Couder; Fausto Gardini | 9; 7 | 7; 5 | 6; 1 |
| 3 | (Spain) (Italy) | José Luis Arilla / Manuel Santana; Nicola Pietrangeli / Orlando Sirola | 7; 5 | 6; 4 | 6; 1 |
| 4 | (Spain) (Italy) | Manuel Santana; Fausto Gardini | 6; 1 | 6; 1 | 10; 8 |
| 5 | (Spain) (Italy) | Juan Manuel Couder; Nicola Pietrangeli | 3; 6 | 6; 3 | 6; 3 | 6; 3 |

== Quarterfinals ==
=== Sweden vs. Yugoslavia ===
Sweden
4
Kungliga tennishallen, Stockholm, Sweden
14–16 June 1963
Clay

Yugoslavia
1

| | | | 1 | 2 | 3 | 4 | 5 |
|---|---|---|---|---|---|---|---|
| 1 | (Sweden) (Socialist Federal Republic of Yugoslavia) | Ulf Schmidt; Nikola Pilić | 3; 6 | 6; 1 | 6; 2 | 6; 1 |
| 2 | (Sweden) (Socialist Federal Republic of Yugoslavia) | Jan-Erik Lundqvist; Boro Jovanović | 6; 0 | 5; 7 | 6; 2 | 6; 4 |
| 3 | (Sweden) (Socialist Federal Republic of Yugoslavia) | Jan-Erik Lundqvist / Ulf Schmidt; Boro Jovanović / Nikola Pilić | 6; 2 | 3; 6 | 6; 4 | 6; 1 |
| 4 | (Sweden) (Socialist Federal Republic of Yugoslavia) | Jan-Erik Lundqvist; Nikola Pilić | 6; 3 | 4; 6 | 13; 11 | 6; 3 |
| 5 | (Sweden) (Socialist Federal Republic of Yugoslavia) | Ulf Schmidt; Boro Jovanović | 6; 2 | 4; 6 | 5; 7 | 5; 7 |

=== Denmark vs. South Africa ===
Denmark
1
Copenhagen, Denmark
14–16 June 1963
Clay

South Africa
4

| | | | 1 | 2 | 3 | 4 | 5 |
|---|---|---|---|---|---|---|---|
| 1 | (Denmark) (South Africa) | Carl-Edvard Hedelund; Cliff Drysdale | 1; 6 | 2; 6 | 0; 6 |
| 2 | (Denmark) (South Africa) | Jørgen Ulrich; Gordon Forbes | 2; 6 | 2; 6 | 4; 6 |
| 3 | (Denmark) (South Africa) | Carl-Edvard Hedelund / Jørgen Ulrich; Gordon Forbes / Abe Segal | 8; 10 | 2; 6 | 4; 6 |
| 4 | (Denmark) (South Africa) | Jørgen Ulrich; Abe Segal | 6; 3 | 9; 7 | 3; 6 | 6; 3 |
| 5 | (Denmark) (South Africa) | Carl-Edvard Hedelund; Gordon Forbes | 2; 6 | 4; 6 | 5; 7 |

=== Great Britain vs. Soviet Union ===
Great Britain
4
Devonshire Park Lawn Tennis Club, Eastbourne, England
13–15 June 1963
Grass

Soviet Union
1

| | | | 1 | 2 | 3 | 4 | 5 |
|---|---|---|---|---|---|---|---|
| 1 | (United Kingdom) (Soviet Union) | Mike Sangster; Alex Metreveli | 6; 4 | 6; 3 | 6; 3 |
| 2 | (United Kingdom) (Soviet Union) | Bobby Wilson; Toomas Leius | 7; 5 | 4; 6 | 8; 10 | 4; 6 |
| 3 | (United Kingdom) (Soviet Union) | Billy Knight / Mike Sangster; Toomas Leius / Sergei Likhachev | 6; 2 | 6; 3 | 4; 6 | 15; 13 |
| 4 | (United Kingdom) (Soviet Union) | Bobby Wilson; Alex Metreveli | 7; 5 | 8; 6 | 6; 2 |
| 5 | (United Kingdom) (Soviet Union) | Mike Sangster; Toomas Leius | 6; 4 | 6; 4 | 6; 3 |

=== Spain vs. France ===
Spain
4
Real Club de Tenis, Barcelona, Spain
14–16 June 1963
Clay

France
1

| | | | 1 | 2 | 3 | 4 | 5 |
|---|---|---|---|---|---|---|---|
| 1 | (Spain) (France) | Manuel Santana; Jean-Claude Barclay | 6; 1 | 6; 2 | 6; 2 |
| 2 | (Spain) (France) | Juan Manuel Couder; Pierre Darmon | 4; 6 | 2; 6 | 0; 6 |
| 3 | (Spain) (France) | José Luis Arilla / Manuel Santana; Patrice Beust / Daniel Contet | 7; 5 | 6; 2 | 6; 2 |
| 4 | (Spain) (France) | Manuel Santana; Pierre Darmon | 6; 3 | 6; 4 | 10; 8 |
| 5 | (Spain) (France) | Juan Manuel Couder; Jean-Claude Barclay | 6; 2 | 6; 1 | 6; 1 |

== Semifinals ==
=== Sweden vs. South Africa ===
Sweden
5
Båstad Tennis Stadium, Båstad, Sweden
19–21 July 1963
Clay

South Africa
0

| | | | 1 | 2 | 3 | 4 | 5 |
|---|---|---|---|---|---|---|---|
| 1 | (Sweden) (South Africa) | Jan-Erik Lundqvist; Cliff Drysdale | 3; 6 | 3; 6 | 6; 0 | 6; 3 | 6; 0 |
| 2 | (Sweden) (South Africa) | Ulf Schmidt; Gordon Forbes | 6; 4 | 6; 4 | 3; 6 | 6; 4 |
| 3 | (Sweden) (South Africa) | Jan-Erik Lundqvist / Ulf Schmidt; Gordon Forbes / Abe Segal | 8; 6 | 5; 7 | 7; 5 | 6; 3 |
| 4 | (Sweden) (South Africa) | Jan-Erik Lundqvist; Gordon Forbes | 6; 2 | 6; 3 | 6; 2 |
| 5 | (Sweden) (South Africa) | Ulf Schmidt; Cliff Drysdale | 6; 2 | 3; 6 | 7; 5 | 6; 0 |

=== Great Britain vs. Spain ===
Great Britain
4
Bristol Lawn Tennis Club, Bristol, England
18–20 July 1963
Grass

Spain
1

| | | | 1 | 2 | 3 | 4 | 5 |
|---|---|---|---|---|---|---|---|
| 1 | (United Kingdom) (Spain) | Mike Sangster; José Luis Arilla | 6; 2 | 6; 4 | 6; 4 |
| 2 | (United Kingdom) (Spain) | Bobby Wilson; Manuel Santana | 4; 6 | 4; 6 | 8; 6 | 6; 2 | 5; 7 |
| 3 | (United Kingdom) (Spain) | Mike Sangster / Bobby Wilson; José Luis Arilla / Manuel Santana | 8; 10 | 7; 5 | 9; 7 | 4; 6 | 6; 1 |
| 4 | (United Kingdom) (Spain) | Bobby Wilson; José Luis Arilla | 6; 4 | 7; 5 | 6; 3 |
| 5 | (United Kingdom) (Spain) | Mike Sangster; Manuel Santana | 6; 4 | 7; 5 | 3; 6 | 4; 6 | 7; 5 |

== Final ==
=== Great Britain vs. Sweden ===
Great Britain
3
No. 1 Court, All England Club, Wimbledon, England
1–5 August 1963
Grass

Sweden
2

| | | | 1 | 2 | 3 | 4 | 5 |
|---|---|---|---|---|---|---|---|
| 1 | (United Kingdom) (Sweden) | Mike Sangster; Jan-Erik Lundqvist | 3; 6 | 6; 2 | 4; 6 | 12; 10 | 9; 7 |
| 2 | (United Kingdom) (Sweden) | Bobby Wilson; Ulf Schmidt | 4; 6 | 6; 4 | 4; 6 | 6; 4 | 4; 6 |
| 3 | (United Kingdom) (Sweden) | Mike Sangster / Bobby Wilson; Jan-Erik Lundqvist / Ulf Schmidt | 22; 20 | 6; 4 | 6; 3 |
| 4 | (United Kingdom) (Sweden) | Bobby Wilson; Jan-Erik Lundqvist | 6; 3 | 6; 2 | 2; 6 | 2; 6 | 1; 6 |
| 5 | (United Kingdom) (Sweden) | Mike Sangster; Ulf Schmidt | 7; 5 | 6; 2 | 9; 11 | 3; 6 | 6; 3 |
