= 1960 Davis Cup Europe Zone =

International tennis competition

Details
- Duration: 22 April 1960 – 31 July 1960
- Teams: 28
- Categories: 1960 Davis Cup America Zone; 1960 Davis Cup Eastern Zone; 1960 Davis Cup Europe Zone

Champion
- Winning nation: Italy; Qualified for: 1960 Davis Cup; Inter-Zonal Finals

The Europe Zone was one of the three regional zones of the 1960 Davis Cup.

28 teams entered the Europe Zone, with the winner going on to compete in the Inter-Zonal Zone against the winners of the America Zone and Eastern Zone. Italy defeated Sweden in the final and progressed to the Inter-Zonal Zone.

== Draw ==
First Round; 22 April–2 May
Italy
bye
Hungary	5
Ireland	0
Luxembourg	2
Monaco	3
Israel	1
Chile	4
Switzerland	2
Belgium	3
Brazil	w/o
Turkey
Norway	2
Netherlands	3
bye
Great Britain
France
bye
Finland	0
Argentina	5
Denmark	3
Yugoslavia	2
Egypt	1
Austria	4
West Germany	3
Czechoslovakia	2
Romania	2
Poland	3
Sweden	5
South Africa	0
bye
Spain

Second Round; 13–15 May
Budapest, Hungary
Italy	3
Hungary	2
Monte Carlo, Monaco
Monaco	2
Chile	3
Brussels, Belgium
Belgium	3
Brazil	2
Scheveningen, Netherlands (clay)
Netherlands	0
Great Britain	5
Paris, France (clay)
France	5
Argentina	0
Vienna, Austria (clay)
Denmark	3
Austria	2
Warsaw, Poland
West Germany	4
Poland	1
Stockholm, Sweden (clay)
Sweden	3
Spain	2

Quarterfinals; 10–12 June
Turin, Italy (clay)
Italy	3
Chile	2
Scarborough, England (grass)
Belgium	0
Great Britain	5
Paris, France (clay)
France	5
Denmark	0
Düsseldorf, West Germany (clay)
West Germany	1
Sweden	4

Semifinals; 15–17 July
Wimbledon, England (grass)
Italy	4
Great Britain	1
Båstad, Sweden (clay)
France	2
Sweden	3

Final; 29–31 July
Båstad, Sweden (clay)
Italy	3
Sweden	2

== First round ==
=== Hungary vs. Ireland ===
Hungary
5
Budapest, Hungary
28–30 April 1960

Ireland
0

			1	2	3	4	5
1	(Hungary) (Republic of Ireland)	András Ádám-Stolpa; Guy Jackson	6; 3	6; 0	6; 3
2	(Hungary) (Republic of Ireland)	István Gulyás; Joseph Hackett	6; 2	6; 2	6; 1
3	(Hungary) (Republic of Ireland)	István Gulyás / András Szikszay; Joseph Hackett / Guy Jackson	7; 5	6; 2	6; 2
4	(Hungary) (Republic of Ireland)	István Gulyás; Guy Jackson	6; 2	6; 3	2; 6	6; 3
5	(Hungary) (Republic of Ireland)	Ferenc Komáromy; Joseph Hackett	6; 1	6; 2	7; 5

=== Luxembourg v Monaco ===
Luxembourg
2
Mondorf-les-Bains, Luxembourg
30 April–2 May 1960

Monaco
3

			1	2	3	4	5
1	(Luxembourg) (Monaco)	Joseph Offenheim; Roland Borghini	6; 2	1; 6	4; 6	3; 6
2	(Luxembourg) (Monaco)	Frank Baden; Georges Pasquier	6; 4	6; 1	7; 5
3	(Luxembourg) (Monaco)	Frank Baden / Gaston Wampach; Roland Borghini / Georges Pasquier	6; 2	3; 6	4; 6	7; 5	6; 2
4	(Luxembourg) (Monaco)	Joseph Offenheim; Georges Pasquier	1; 6	1; 6	1; 6
5	(Luxembourg) (Monaco)	Frank Baden; Roland Borghini	2; 6	2; 6	3; 6

=== Israel vs. Chile ===
Israel
1
Tel Aviv, Israel
29 April–1 May 1960
Hard

Chile
4

			1	2	3	4	5
1	(Israel) (Chile)	Eleazar Davidman; Patricio Rodríguez	9; 7	4; 6	6; 4	6; 2
2	(Israel) (Chile)	Arie Avidan-Weiss; Luis Ayala	1; 6	1; 6	2; 6
3	(Israel) (Chile)	Arie Avidan-Weiss / Eleazar Davidman; Ernesto Aguirre / Luis Ayala	2; 6	1; 6	0; 6
4	(Israel) (Chile)	Arie Avidan-Weiss; Patricio Rodríguez	6; 2	5; 7	0; 6	5; 7
5	(Israel) (Chile)	Eleazar Davidman; Luis Ayala	2; 6	1; 6	1; 6

=== Switzerland vs. Belgium ===
Switzerland
2
Geneva, Switzerland
29 April–1 May 1960

Belgium
3

			1	2	3	4	5
1	(Switzerland) (Belgium)	Paul Blondel; Jacques Brichant	2; 6	2; 6	1; 6
2	(Switzerland) (Belgium)	Heinz Grimm; Jean-Pierre Froment	3; 6	6; 2	6; 4	6; 2
3	(Switzerland) (Belgium)	Heinz Grimm / Ernst Schori; Jacques Brichant / Philippe Washer	2; 6	0; 6	2; 6
4	(Switzerland) (Belgium)	Paul Blondel; Jean-Pierre Froment	3; 6	6; 2	6; 4	1; 6	7; 5
5	(Switzerland) (Belgium)	Heinz Grimm; Jacques Brichant	1; 6	3; 6	0; 6

=== Norway vs. Netherlands ===
Norway
2
Oslo, Norway
29 April–1 May 1960
Clay

Netherlands
3

			1	2	3	4	5
1	(Norway) (Netherlands)	Gunnar Høst Sjøwall; Willem Maris	3; 6	2; 6	4; 6
2	(Norway) (Netherlands)	Thorvald Moe; Pieter van Eijsden	6; 4	1; 6	4; 6	4; 6
3	(Norway) (Netherlands)	Finn-Dag Jagge / Thorvald Moe; Hans van Dalsum / Willem Maris	6; 1	6; 4	8; 6
4	(Norway) (Netherlands)	Thorvald Moe; Willem Maris	6; 4	8; 6	6; 0
5	(Norway) (Netherlands)	Gunnar Høst Sjøwall; Pieter van Eijsden	2; 6	6; 4	6; 3	3; 6	3; 6

=== Finland vs. Argentina ===
Finland
0
Helsinki, Finland
29 April–1 May 1960

Argentina
5

			1	2	3	4	5
1	(Finland) (Argentina)	Reino Nyyssönen; Eduardo Soriano	4; 6	5; 7	4; 6
2	(Finland) (Argentina)	Sakari Salo; Roberto Aubone	7; 9	5; 7	6; 4	3; 6
3	(Finland) (Argentina)	Matti Kinnunen / Sakari Salo; Roberto Aubone / Eduardo Soriano	2; 6	4; 6	3; 6
4	(Finland) (Argentina)	Sakari Salo; Eduardo Soriano	5; 7	8; 6	6; 8	4; 6
5	(Finland) (Argentina)	Tapio Jokinen; Roberto Aubone	3; 6	4; 6	3; 6

=== Denmark vs. Yugoslavia ===
Denmark
3
Copenhagen, Denmark
29 April–1 May 1960
Clay

Yugoslavia
2

			1	2	3	4	5
1	(Denmark) (Socialist Federal Republic of Yugoslavia)	Kurt Nielsen; Boro Jovanović	6; 1	1; 6	1; 6	4; 6
2	(Denmark) (Socialist Federal Republic of Yugoslavia)	Jørgen Ulrich; Ilija Panajotović	7; 5	5; 7	6; 1	6; 1
3	(Denmark) (Socialist Federal Republic of Yugoslavia)	Jørgen Ulrich / Torben Ulrich; Boro Jovanović / Ilija Panajotović	6; 4	4; 6	6; 1	5; 7	7; 5
4	(Denmark) (Socialist Federal Republic of Yugoslavia)	Jørgen Ulrich; Boro Jovanović	5; 7	6; 3	4; 6	6; 0	9; 7
5	(Denmark) (Socialist Federal Republic of Yugoslavia)	Kurt Nielsen; Ilija Panajotović	4; 6	2; 6	6; 3	6; 2	4; 6

=== Egypt vs. Austria ===
Egypt
1
Cairo, Egypt
29 April–1 May 1960

Austria
4

			1	2	3	4	5
1	(Egypt) (Austria)	Fathi Mohammed-Ali; Franz Saiko	2; 6	1; 6	6; 3	3; 6
2	(Egypt) (Austria)	Ibrahim Badreldin-Sayed; Ladislav Legenstein	6; 8	3; 6	7; 5	5; 7
3	(Egypt) (Austria)	Fathi Mohammed-Ali / Nabil Hassan; Franz Hainka / Ladislav Legenstein	1; 6	5; 7	3; 6
4	(Egypt) (Austria)	Ibrahim Badreldin-Sayed; Franz Hainka	6; 3	2; 6	6; 1	7; 5
5	(Egypt) (Austria)	Fathi Mohammed-Ali; Ladislav Legenstein	10; 8	3; 6	1; 6	4; 5		retired

=== West Germany vs. Czechoslovakia ===
West Germany
3
Hanover, West Germany
29 April–1 May 1960

Czechoslovakia
2

			1	2	3	4	5
1	(West Germany) (Czechoslovakia)	Christian Kuhnke; Pavel Korda	6; 4	5; 7	6; 4	1; 6	2; 6
2	(West Germany) (Czechoslovakia)	Wolfgang Stuck; Jiří Javorský	5; 7	6; 8	1; 6
3	(West Germany) (Czechoslovakia)	Christian Kuhnke / Wolfgang Stuck; Jiří Javorský / Pavel Korda	6; 4	3; 6	6; 2	6; 2
4	(West Germany) (Czechoslovakia)	Wolfgang Stuck; Pavel Korda	6; 4	6; 0	6; 1
5	(West Germany) (Czechoslovakia)	Christian Kuhnke; Jiří Javorský	6; 3	6; 2	6; 4

=== Romania vs. Poland ===
Romania
2
Bucharest, Romania
22–24 April 1960
Clay

Poland
3

			1	2	3	4	5
1	(Romania) (Poland)	Gheorghe Viziru; Wiesław Gąsiorek	6; 3	3; 6	6; 4	2; 6	6; 3
2	(Romania) (Poland)	Ion Țiriac; Władysław Skonecki	5; 7	4; 6	7; 5	3; 6
3	(Romania) (Poland)	Ștefan Georgescu / Ion Țiriac; Wiesław Gąsiorek / Józef Piątek	7; 5	2; 6	4; 6	3; 6
4	(Romania) (Poland)	Gheorghe Viziru; Władysław Skonecki	6; 1	6; 2	8; 6
5	(Romania) (Poland)	Ion Țiriac; Wiesław Gąsiorek	6; 4	4; 6	6; 8	3; 6

=== Sweden vs. South Africa ===
Sweden
5
Kungliga tennishallen, Stockholm, Sweden
29 April–1 May 1960
Clay

South Africa
0

			1	2	3	4	5
1	(Sweden) (South Africa)	Ulf Schmidt; Ian Vermaak	6; 0	6; 8	6; 4	8; 6
2	(Sweden) (South Africa)	Jan-Erik Lundqvist; Gaetan Koenig	6; 1	6; 2	6; 4
3	(Sweden) (South Africa)	Jan-Erik Lundqvist / Ulf Schmidt; Albert Gaertner / Ian Vermaak	6; 4	6; 2	6; 3
4	(Sweden) (South Africa)	Jan-Erik Lundqvist; Albert Gaertner	6; 2	6; 8	3; 6	6; 4	6; 1
5	(Sweden) (South Africa)	Ulf Schmidt; Gaetan Koenig	6; 2	2; 6	6; 3	6; 2

== Second round ==
=== Hungary vs. Italy ===
Hungary
2
Budapest, Hungary
13–15 May 1960

Italy
3

			1	2	3	4	5
1	(Hungary) (Italy)	András Ádám-Stolpa; Orlando Sirola	6; 2	2; 6	6; 8	6; 2	6; 1
2	(Hungary) (Italy)	István Gulyás; Nicola Pietrangeli	6; 1	2; 6	4; 6	4; 6
3	(Hungary) (Italy)	István Gulyás / András Szikszay; Nicola Pietrangeli / Orlando Sirola	6; 1	3; 6	3; 6	3; 6
4	(Hungary) (Italy)	András Ádám-Stolpa; Nicola Pietrangeli	2; 6	6; 3	2; 6	4; 6
5	(Hungary) (Italy)	István Gulyás; Sergio Tacchini	6; 3	6; 2	4; 6	5; 7	6; 3

=== Monaco vs. Chile ===
Monaco
2
Monte Carlo, Monaco
13–15 May 1960

Chile
3

			1	2	3	4	5
1	(Monaco) (Chile)	Roland Borghini; Luis Ayala	0; 6	2; 6	1; 6
2	(Monaco) (Chile)	Georges Pasquier; Patricio Rodríguez	1; 6	1; 6	6; 3	4; 6
3	(Monaco) (Chile)	Roland Borghini / Adrien Viviani; Ernesto Aguirre / Luis Ayala	3; 6	2; 6	3; 6
4	(Monaco) (Chile)	Roland Borghini; Patricio Rodríguez	6; 2	6; 2	6; 1
5	(Monaco) (Chile)	Adrien Viviani; Ernesto Aguirre	6; 1	6; 0				retired

=== Belgium vs. Brazil ===
Belgium
3
Brussels, Belgium
13–15 May 1960

Brazil
2

			1	2	3	4	5
1	(Belgium) (Brazil)	Claude De Gronckel; Carlos Alberto Fernandes	3; 6	0; 6	6; 8
2	(Belgium) (Brazil)	Jacques Brichant; Ronald Barnes	6; 2	6; 3	5; 7	6; 1
3	(Belgium) (Brazil)	Jacques Brichant / Philippe Washer; Ronald Barnes / Carlos Alberto Fernandes	6; 3	6; 2	4; 6	9; 7
4	(Belgium) (Brazil)	Jacques Brichant; Carlos Alberto Fernandes	6; 1	6; 4	6; 3
5	(Belgium) (Brazil)	Claude De Gronckel; Ronald Barnes	5; 7	0; 6	8; 10

=== Netherlands vs. Great Britain ===
Netherlands
0
Scheveningen, Netherlands
13–15 May 1960
Clay

Great Britain
5

			1	2	3	4	5
1	(Netherlands) (United Kingdom)	Willem Maris; Billy Knight	0; 6	4; 6	3; 6
2	(Netherlands) (United Kingdom)	Pieter van Eijsden; Mike Davies	7; 9	4; 6	2; 6
3	(Netherlands) (United Kingdom)	Pieter van Eijsden / Willem Maris; Mike Davies / Billy Knight	2; 6	2; 6	2; 6
4	(Netherlands) (United Kingdom)	Pieter van Eijsden; Roger Becker	1; 6	0; 6	3; 6
5	(Netherlands) (United Kingdom)	Willem Maris; Mike Sangster	2; 6	3; 6	3; 6

=== France vs. Argentina ===
France
5
Stade Roland Garros, Paris, France
13–15 May 1960
Clay

Argentina
0

			1	2	3	4	5
1	(France) (Argentina)	Robert Haillet; Eduardo Soriano	6; 3	6; 1	5; 7	6; 2
2	(France) (Argentina)	Gérard Pilet; Roberto Aubone	6; 0	6; 2	6; 3
3	(France) (Argentina)	Jean-Noël Grinda / Jean-Claude Molinari; Roberto Aubone / Eduardo Soriano	6; 2	9; 11	15; 13	6; 1
4	(France) (Argentina)	Robert Haillet; Roberto Aubone	6; 2	6; 1	6; 1
5	(France) (Argentina)	Gérard Pilet; Eduardo Soriano	6; 4	6; 2	6; 2

=== Austria vs. Denmark ===
Austria
2
Vienna, Austria
13–15 May 1960
Clay

Denmark
3

			1	2	3	4	5
1	(Austria) (Denmark)	Franz Saiko; Kurt Nielsen	6; 1	1; 6	4; 6	4; 6
2	(Austria) (Denmark)	Ladislav Legenstein; Jørgen Ulrich	6; 4	4; 6	3; 6	6; 1	3; 6
3	(Austria) (Denmark)	Franz Hainka / Ladislav Legenstein; Jørgen Ulrich / Torben Ulrich	1; 6	3; 6	6; 0	6; 1	7; 5
4	(Austria) (Denmark)	Franz Saiko; Jørgen Ulrich	3; 6	0; 6	2; 6
5	(Austria) (Denmark)	Ladislav Legenstein; Kurt Nielsen	6; 4	6; 4	6; 3

=== Poland vs. West Germany ===
Poland
1
Warsaw, Poland
13–15 May 1960

West Germany
4

			1	2	3	4	5
1	(Poland) (West Germany)	Władysław Skonecki; Wolfgang Stuck	6; 8	1; 6	4; 6
2	(Poland) (West Germany)	Wiesław Gąsiorek; Christian Kuhnke	5; 7	1; 6	7; 5	3; 6
3	(Poland) (West Germany)	Wiesław Gąsiorek / Józef Piątek; Christian Kuhnke / Wolfgang Stuck	1; 6	5; 7	4; 6
4	(Poland) (West Germany)	Andrzej Licis; Wilhelm Bungert	2; 6	4; 6	6; 3	6; 4	6; 2
5	(Poland) (West Germany)	Wiesław Gąsiorek; Wolfgang Stuck	3; 6	5; 7	3; 6

=== Sweden vs. Spain ===
Sweden
3
Kungliga tennishallen, Stockholm, Sweden
13–15 May 1960
Clay

Spain
2

			1	2	3	4	5
1	(Sweden) (Spain)	Jan-Erik Lundqvist; Andrés Gimeno	2; 6	6; 4	3; 6	2; 6
2	(Sweden) (Spain)	Ulf Schmidt; Manuel Santana	6; 2	6; 4	4; 6	3; 6	6; 2
3	(Sweden) (Spain)	Jan-Erik Lundqvist / Ulf Schmidt; José Luis Arilla / Andrés Gimeno	6; 4	7; 5	6; 4
4	(Sweden) (Spain)	Jan-Erik Lundqvist; Manuel Santana	9; 7	6; 4	6; 3
5	(Sweden) (Spain)	Ulf Schmidt; Andrés Gimeno	5; 7	3; 6	2; 6

== Quarterfinals ==
=== Italy vs. Chile ===
Italy
3
Turin, Italy
10–12 June 1960
Clay

Chile
2

			1	2	3	4	5
1	(Italy) (Chile)	Orlando Sirola; Luis Ayala	4; 6	6; 3	3; 6	2; 6
2	(Italy) (Chile)	Nicola Pietrangeli; Patricio Rodríguez	6; 1	6; 4	6; 1
3	(Italy) (Chile)	Nicola Pietrangeli / Orlando Sirola; Ernesto Aguirre / Luis Ayala	6; 1	6; 3	8; 6
4	(Italy) (Chile)	Nicola Pietrangeli; Luis Ayala	4; 6	1; 6	1; 6
5	(Italy) (Chile)	Orlando Sirola; Patricio Rodríguez	6; 0	7; 5	6; 3

=== Great Britain vs. Belgium ===
Great Britain
5
Yorkshire Lawn Tennis Club, Scarborough, England
10–12 June 1960
Grass

Belgium
0

			1	2	3	4	5
1	(United Kingdom) (Belgium)	Billy Knight; Eric Drossart	6; 0	6; 2	6; 1
2	(United Kingdom) (Belgium)	Mike Davies; Jacques Brichant	3; 6	9; 7	6; 1	8; 6
3	(United Kingdom) (Belgium)	Mike Davies / Bobby Wilson; Jacques Brichant / Eric Drossart	6; 1	6; 3	6; 4
4	(United Kingdom) (Belgium)	Bobby Wilson; Eric Drossart	6; 2	6; 1	6; 2
5	(United Kingdom) (Belgium)	Billy Knight; Jacques Brichant	6; 4	6; 2	6; 2

=== France vs. Denmark ===
France
5
Stade Roland Garros, Paris, France
10–12 June 1960
Clay

Denmark
0

			1	2	3	4	5
1	(France) (Denmark)	Pierre Darmon; Kurt Nielsen	6; 1	6; 2	6; 3
2	(France) (Denmark)	Robert Haillet; Jørgen Ulrich	10; 8	6; 2	2; 6	6; 3
3	(France) (Denmark)	Jean-Noël Grinda / Jean-Claude Molinari; Kurt Nielsen / Jørgen Ulrich	6; 3	9; 7	7; 5
4	(France) (Denmark)	Jean-Noël Grinda; Jan Leschly	6; 2	6; 3	0; 6	6; 3
5	(France) (Denmark)	Robert Haillet; Kurt Nielsen	6; 1	10; 8	6; 8	6; 1

=== West Germany vs. Sweden ===
West Germany
1
Rochusclub, Düsseldorf, West Germany
10–12 June 1960
Clay

Sweden
4

			1	2	3	4	5
1	(West Germany) (Sweden)	Christian Kuhnke; Ulf Schmidt	6; 3	6; 4	6; 4
2	(West Germany) (Sweden)	Wolfgang Stuck; Jan-Erik Lundqvist	6; 8	1; 6	2; 6
3	(West Germany) (Sweden)	Christian Kuhnke / Wolfgang Stuck; Jan-Erik Lundqvist / Ulf Schmidt	3; 6	3; 6	7; 5	7; 9
4	(West Germany) (Sweden)	Christian Kuhnke; Jan-Erik Lundqvist	3; 6	6; 8	4; 6
5	(West Germany) (Sweden)	Wolfgang Stuck; Ulf Schmidt	5; 7	2; 6	0; 6

== Semifinals ==
=== Great Britain vs. Italy ===
Great Britain
1
No. 1 Court, All England Club, Wimbledon, England
15–17 July 1960
Grass

Italy
4

			1	2	3	4	5
1	(United Kingdom) (Italy)	Bobby Wilson; Nicola Pietrangeli	4; 6	3; 6	6; 4	5; 7
2	(United Kingdom) (Italy)	Mike Davies; Orlando Sirola	7; 9	5; 7	6; 1	6; 2	4; 6
3	(United Kingdom) (Italy)	Mike Davies / Bobby Wilson; Nicola Pietrangeli / Orlando Sirola	4; 6	6; 3	6; 8	3; 6
4	(United Kingdom) (Italy)	Bobby Wilson; Sergio Tacchini	3; 6	6; 3	8; 6	6; 2
5	(United Kingdom) (Italy)	Mike Davies; Nicola Pietrangeli	4; 6	3; 6	4; 6

=== Sweden vs. France ===
Sweden
3
Båstad Tennis Stadium, Båstad, Sweden
15–17 July 1960
Clay

France
2

			1	2	3	4	5
1	(Sweden) (France)	Jan-Erik Lundqvist; Pierre Darmon	6; 0	6; 3	6; 1
2	(Sweden) (France)	Sven Davidson; Robert Haillet	4; 6	3; 6	6; 2	6; 2	6; 3
3	(Sweden) (France)	Jan-Erik Lundqvist / Ulf Schmidt; Jean-Noël Grinda / Jean-Claude Molinari	2; 6	6; 4	6; 4	6; 2
4	(Sweden) (France)	Sven Davidson; Pierre Darmon	2; 6	8; 6	7; 9	4; 6
5	(Sweden) (France)	Torsten Johansson; Robert Haillet	7; 9	3; 6	1; 6

== Final ==
=== Sweden vs. Italy ===
Sweden
2
Båstad Tennis Stadium, Båstad, Sweden
29–31 July 1960
Clay

Italy
3

			1	2	3	4	5
1	(Sweden) (Italy)	Jan-Erik Lundqvist; Orlando Sirola	6; 4	4; 6	6; 3	6; 3
2	(Sweden) (Italy)	Ulf Schmidt; Nicola Pietrangeli	1; 6	4; 6	6; 4	4; 6
3	(Sweden) (Italy)	Jan-Erik Lundqvist / Ulf Schmidt; Nicola Pietrangeli / Orlando Sirola	16; 14	7; 5	2; 6	3; 6	2; 6
4	(Sweden) (Italy)	Ulf Schmidt; Orlando Sirola	4; 6	2; 6	1; 6
5	(Sweden) (Italy)	Jan-Erik Lundqvist; Sergio Tacchini	6; 2	6; 1	6; 1
