= 1960 Davis Cup Eastern Zone =

International tennis competition

The Eastern Zone was one of the three regional zones of the 1960 Davis Cup.

6 teams entered the Eastern Zone, with the winner going on to compete in the Inter-Zonal Zone against the winners of the America Zone and Europe Zone. The Philippines defeated India in the final and progressed to the Inter-Zonal Zone.

== Draw ==
Quarterfinals; 4–6 April
Philippines
bye
Tokyo, Japan
Japan	5
South Korea	0
Colombo, Ceylon (clay)
India	5
Ceylon	0
bye
Thailand

Semifinals; 22–24 April
Manila, Philippines
Philippines	3
Japan	2
Bangkok, Thailand
India	5
Thailand	0

Final; 27–29 May
Manila, Philippines
Philippines	3
India	0

== Quarterfinals ==
=== Japan vs. South Korea ===
Japan
5
Tokyo, Japan
4–6 April 1960

South Korea
0

			1	2	3	4	5
1	(Japan) (South Korea)	Osamu Ishiguro; Lee Sang-yun	6; 1	6; 2	6; 4
2	(Japan) (South Korea)	Yuzuru Furuta; Um Hwa-yong	6; 2	6; 2	6; 3
3	(Japan) (South Korea)	Akira Ichiyama / Masao Nagasaki; Kim Ke-hwan / Lee Sang-yun	3; 6	6; 4	6; 1	6; 3
4	(Japan) (South Korea)	Yuzuru Furuta; Lee Sang-yun	6; 2	7; 5	6; 4
5	(Japan) (South Korea)	Osamu Ishiguro; Um Hwa-yong	6; 2	6; 2	6; 4

=== Ceylon vs. India ===
Ceylon
0
Ceylon Lawn Tennis Association, Colombo, Ceylon
4–6 April 1960
Clay

India
5

			1	2	3	4	5
1	(Dominion of Ceylon) (India)	David Nevins-Selvadurai; Ramanathan Krishnan	0; 6	0; 6	1; 6
2	(Dominion of Ceylon) (India)	Bernard Pinto; Naresh Kumar	2; 6	3; 6	3; 6
3	(Dominion of Ceylon) (India)	Rupert Ferdinands / Bernard Pinto; Ramanathan Krishnan / Naresh Kumar	3; 6	4; 6	1; 6
4	(Dominion of Ceylon) (India)	Bernard Pinto; Ramanathan Krishnan	3; 6	2; 6	2; 6
5	(Dominion of Ceylon) (India)	David Nevins-Selvadurai; Naresh Kumar	1; 6	2; 6	0; 6

== Semifinals ==
=== Philippines vs. Japan ===
Philippines
3
Manila, Philippines
22–24 April 1960

Japan
2

			1	2	3	4	5
1	(Philippines) (Japan)	Raymundo Deyro; Masao Nagasaki	6; 1	6; 1	6; 4
2	(Philippines) (Japan)	Juan-Johnson José; Osamu Ishiguro	6; 4	3; 6	4; 6	6; 0	3; 6
3	(Philippines) (Japan)	Raymundo Deyro / Juan-Johnson José; Osamu Ishiguro / Masao Nagasaki	6; 2	7; 5	6; 1
4	(Philippines) (Japan)	Juan-Johnson José; Masao Nagasaki	0; 6	1; 6	9; 7	6; 4	6; 0
5	(Philippines) (Japan)	Eduardo Dungo; Osamu Ishiguro	1; 6	4; 6	4; 6

=== Thailand vs. India ===
Thailand
0
Bangkok, Thailand
22–24 April 1960

India
5

			1	2	3	4	5
1	(Thailand) (India)	Sutiraphan Karalak; Jaidip Mukerjea	9; 11	6; 0	2; 6	6; 3	3; 6
2	(Thailand) (India)	Seri Charuchinda; Naresh Kumar	3; 6	2; 6	4; 6
3	(Thailand) (India)	Sutiraphan Karalak / Kravi Sudasna; Naresh Kumar / Jaidip Mukerjea	4; 6	2; 6	6; 3	3; 6
4	(Thailand) (India)	Sutiraphan Karalak; Naresh Kumar	10; 8	3; 6	0; 6	6; 4	2; 6
5	(Thailand) (India)	Seri Charuchinda; Jaidip Mukerjea	1; 6	3; 6	7; 5	2; 6

== Final ==
=== Philippines vs. India ===
Philippines
3
Manila, Philippines
27–29 May 1960

India
0

			1	2	3	4	5
1	(Philippines) (India)	Raymundo Deyro; Naresh Kumar	6; 0	6; 1	6; 1
2	(Philippines) (India)	Felicisimo Ampon; Ramanathan Krishnan	6; 3	8; 6	6; 1
3	(Philippines) (India)	Eduardo Dungo / Juan-Johnson José; Ramanathan Krishnan / Naresh Kumar	6; 2	6; 2	6; 2
4	(Philippines) (India)	Felicisimo Ampon; Naresh Kumar						not played
5	(Philippines) (India)	Raymundo Deyro; Ramanathan Krishnan						not played
