= Israel Autumn International Championships =

Defunct tennis tournament
- Tour: ILTF World Circuit (1955–1972)
- Founded: 1955; 71 years ago
- Abolished: 1972; 54 years ago
- Location: Tel Aviv, Israel
- Surface: Clay / outdoor

The Israel Autumn International Championships was a tennis tournament held in Israel. Also known as the Israel Autumn International Invitation.

In the same era, there was also the Israel Spring International Championships, held typically in April.

The autumn tournament was held typically in October.

== Past finals ==
=== Men's singles ===
Year	Winners	Runners-up	Score
↓ ILTF World Circuit ↓
1955	(Israel) Eleazar Davidman	(Israel) Arie Avidan-Weiss	6–3, 1–6, 6–3, 6–2
1956	(Israel) Eleazar Davidman	(Israel) Arie Avidan-Weiss	6–4, 4–1 rtd.
1958	(Israel) Gabriel Dubitsky	(Israel) David Asz	3–6, 7–5, 6–4, 6–2
1959	(Israel) Eleazar Davidman	(Turkey) Nazmi Bari	6–0, 6–1, 6–0
1960	(Israel) Eleazar Davidman	(Israel) Gabriel Dubitsky	6–3, 6–4, 4–6, 6–2
1961	(United States) Gabriel Dubitsky	(Israel) Ya'acov Brokmann	6–3, 6–3
1962	(Israel) Eleazar Davidman	(Australia) John Hillebrand	6–1, 2–6, 4–6, 6–3, 6–1
1963	(United States) Chuck McKinley	(United States) Frank Froehling	6–4, 6–4
1964	(Australia) Martin Mulligan	(Israel) Eleazar Davidman	6–4, 6–4, 6–1
1965	(Greece) Nicky Kalogeropoulos	(Chile) Patricio Rodríguez	6–4, 6–2, 5–7, 6–4
1966	(United States) Bill Hoogs Jr.	(Israel) Eleazar Davidman	7–5, 6–4
1967	(Greece) Nicky Kalogeropoulos	(Israel) Eleazar Davidman	4–6, 6–4, 6–1, 6–4
↓ Open era ↓
1968	(Romania) Petre Mărmureanu	(Greece) Nicky Kalogeropoulos	2–6, 6–2, 6–3, 6–3
1969	(Czechoslovakia) Jan Kukal	(Romania) Petre Mărmureanu	6–3, 6–2, 6–1
↓ ILTF Independent Circuit ↓
1970	(Romania) Petre Mărmureanu	(Israel) Josef Stabholz	6–1, 6–2
1971	(Rhodesia) Hank Irvine	(Australia) Andrew Rae	6–1, 6–2, 7–5
1972	(Australia) Syd Ball	(Australia) John Bartlett	7–6, 7–6, 1–6, 6–4

== See also ==
- Category:National and multi-national tennis tournaments
