= 1963 Davis Cup Eastern Zone =

International tennis competition

The Eastern Zone was one of the three regional zones of the 1963 Davis Cup.

9 teams entered the Eastern Zone, with the winner going on to compete in the Inter-Zonal Zone against the winners of the America Zone and Europe Zone. India defeated Japan in the final and progressed to the Inter-Zonal Zone.

== Draw ==
First Round; 17–19 March
Colombo, Ceylon (clay)
Ceylon	0
Pakistan	4

Quarterfinals; 27 March–7 April
Poona, India
Pakistan	1
India	4
Kuala Lumpur, Malaya
Malaya	3
Burma	2
Fukuoka, Japan
Japan	5
South Korea	0
Manila, Philippines
New Zealand	1
Philippines	3

Semifinals; 19–22 April
Kuala Lumpur, Malaya
India	4
Malaya	0
Tokyo, Japan
Japan	4
Philippines	1

Final; 4–6 May
Tokyo, Japan
India	3
Japan	2

== First round ==
=== Ceylon vs. Pakistan ===
Ceylon
0
Ceylon Lawn Tennis Association, Colombo, Ceylon
17–19 March 1963
Clay

Pakistan
4

			1	2	3	4	5
1	(Dominion of Ceylon) (Pakistan)	Raja Praesody; Munir Pirzada	1; 6	3; 6	4; 6
2	(Dominion of Ceylon) (Pakistan)	Gamini Perera; Sheikh Qutubuddin	4; 6	4; 6	1; 6
3	(Dominion of Ceylon) (Pakistan)	Senaka Kumara / Bernard Pinto; Khan-Iftikhar Ahmed / Munir Pirzada	7; 9	7; 5	7; 9	4; 6
4	(Dominion of Ceylon) (Pakistan)	Raja Praesody; Zulfiqar Rahim	1; 6	6; 3	1; 6	6; 2	4; 6
5	(Dominion of Ceylon) (Pakistan)	Gamini Perera; Munir Pirzada	1; 6	3; 6				not completed

== Quarterfinals ==
=== India vs. Pakistan ===
India
4
Poona, India
31 March–2 April 1963

Pakistan
1

			1	2	3	4	5
1	(India) (Pakistan)	Ramanathan Krishnan; Sheikh Qutubuddin	6; 0	6; 3	6; 0
2	(India) (Pakistan)	Jaidip Mukerjea; Munir Pirzada	6; 3	6; 4	6; 2
3	(India) (Pakistan)	Akhtar Ali / Jaidip Mukerjea; Khan-Iftikhar Ahmed / Munir Pirzada	3; 6	5; 7	6; 3	6; 4	6; 2
4	(India) (Pakistan)	Jaidip Mukerjea; Sheikh Qutubuddin	6; 2	6; 3	6; 4
5	(India) (Pakistan)	Akhtar Ali; Zulfiqar Rahim	8; 6	2; 6	6; 1	5; 7	3; 6

=== Malaya vs. Burma ===
Malaya
3
Kuala Lumpur, Malaya
27–30 March 1963

Burma
2

			1	2	3	4	5
1	(Federation of Malaya) (Myanmar)	Sultan-Aman Azman; Joe Ba Maung	4; 6	6; 1	6; 3	6; 1
2	(Federation of Malaya) (Myanmar)	Yoke-Yen Kwok; Than Lwin	4; 6	2; 6	2; 6
3	(Federation of Malaya) (Myanmar)	Sultan-Aman Azman / Yoke-Yen Kwok; Joe Ba Maung / Than Lwin	16; 14	6; 0	3; 6	1; 6	6; 4
4	(Federation of Malaya) (Myanmar)	Sultan-Aman Azman; Than Lwin	6; 0	6; 2	6; 2
5	(Federation of Malaya) (Myanmar)	Yoke-Yen Kwok; Joe Ba Maung	4; 6	5; 7	2; 6

=== Japan vs. South Korea ===
Japan
5
Fukuoka, Japan
5–7 April 1963

South Korea
0

			1	2	3	4	5
1	(Japan) (South Korea)	Osamu Ishiguro; Lee Sang-yun	6; 2	1; 6	6; 3	6; 2
2	(Japan) (South Korea)	Koji Watanabe; Kim Doo-hwan	6; 3	6; 2	7; 5
3	(Japan) (South Korea)	Michio Fujii / Atsushi Miyagi; Lee Sang-yun / Park Do-sung	3; 6	6; 0	6; 2	6; 1
4	(Japan) (South Korea)	Osamu Ishiguro; Kim Doo-hwan	6; 2	6; 2	6; 0
5	(Japan) (South Korea)	Koji Watanabe; Lee Sang-yun	6; 4	2; 6	6; 3	6; 2

=== Philippines vs. New Zealand ===
Philippines
3
Manila, Philippines
29–31 March 1963

New Zealand
1

			1	2	3	4	5
1	(Philippines) (New Zealand)	Juan-Johnson José; Lew Gerrard	2; 6	6; 3	6; 3	9; 7
2	(Philippines) (New Zealand)	Felicisimo Ampon; Ian Crookenden	4; 6	6; 4	1; 6	6; 4	6; 1
3	(Philippines) (New Zealand)	Raymundo Deyro / Juan-Johnson José; Lew Gerrard / Jeff Robson	4; 6	3; 6	6; 3	3; 6
4	(Philippines) (New Zealand)	Felicisimo Ampon; Lew Gerrard	6; 1	4; 6	6; 3	6; 4
5	(Philippines) (New Zealand)	Juan-Johnson José; Ian Crookenden						not played

== Semifinals ==
=== Malaya vs. India ===
Malaya
0
Kuala Lumpur, Malaya
19–22 April 1963

India
4

			1	2	3	4	5
1	(Federation of Malaya) (India)	Sultan-Aman Azman; Ramanathan Krishnan	1; 6	1; 6	0; 6
2	(Federation of Malaya) (India)	Billy Yap; Jaidip Mukerjea	1; 6	0; 6	2; 6
3	(Federation of Malaya) (India)	Sultan-Aman Azman / Yoke-Yen Kwok; Akhtar Ali / Jaidip Mukerjea	4; 6	2; 6	4; 6
4	(Federation of Malaya) (India)	Sultan-Aman Azman; Jaidip Mukerjea	2; 6	2; 6	3; 6
5	(Federation of Malaya) (India)	Billy Yap; Akhtar Ali	3; 6	2; 6				not completed

=== Japan vs. Philippines ===
Japan
4
Tokyo, Japan
19–22 April 1963

Philippines
1

			1	2	3	4	5
1	(Japan) (Philippines)	Atsushi Miyagi; Juan-Johnson José	3; 6	6; 1	6; 2	7; 5
2	(Japan) (Philippines)	Osamu Ishiguro; Felicisimo Ampon	6; 3	6; 0	3; 6	6; 3
3	(Japan) (Philippines)	Michio Fujii / Atsushi Miyagi; Eduardo Dungo / Juan-Johnson José	6; 4	3; 6	7; 5	8; 6
4	(Japan) (Philippines)	Osamu Ishiguro; Juan-Johnson José	6; 0	2; 6	1; 6	8; 10
5	(Japan) (Philippines)	Atsushi Miyagi; Felicisimo Ampon	2; 6	6; 3	6; 4	8; 6

== Final ==
=== Japan vs. India ===
Japan
2
Tokyo, Japan
3–7 May 1963

India
3

			1	2	3	4	5
1	(Japan) (India)	Atsushi Miyagi; Ramanathan Krishnan	5; 7	6; 4	0; 6	0; 6
2	(Japan) (India)	Osamu Ishiguro; Jaidip Mukerjea	6; 2	6; 3	6; 2
3	(Japan) (India)	Michio Fujii / Atsushi Miyagi; Premjit Lall / Jaidip Mukerjea	6; 4	3; 6	2; 6	5; 7
4	(Japan) (India)	Osamu Ishiguro; Ramanathan Krishnan	2; 6	5; 7
5	(Japan) (India)	Atsushi Miyagi; Jaidip Mukerjea	6; 3	6; 2	3; 6	7; 5
