= Israel Spring International Championships =

Defunct tennis tournament
- Tour: ILTF World Circuit (1956–1972)
- Founded: 1956; 70 years ago
- Abolished: 1978; 48 years ago
- Location: Tel Aviv, Israel
- Venue: Maccabi Tennis Club
- Surface: Clay / outdoor

The Israel Spring International Championships was a men's and women's clay court tennis tournament founded in 1956.

Also known as the Tel Aviv Spring Meeting the tournament was played at the Maccabi Tennis Club, Tel Aviv, Israel, usually in April, until 1978.

The Israel Autumn International Championships was another event held in Israel during the same era, typically in October.

Eleazar Davidman won most men's singles tites (3).

== Finals ==
=== Men's singles ===
(incomplete roll)

Year	Winners	Runners-up	Score
↓ ILTF World Circuit ↓
1956	(Socialist Federal Republic of Yugoslavia) Vladimir Petrović	(Israel) Arie Avidan-Weiss	6–1, 3–6, 4–6, 6–3, 6–1.
1957	(Israel) Arie Avidan-Weiss	(Israel) Eleazar Davidman	3–6, 6–4, 6–3, 2–6, 6–4.
1958	(Israel) Arie Avidan-Weiss (2)	(Israel) Eleazar Davidman	6–1, 6–4, 6–1.
1959	(Israel) Eleazar Davidman	(Israel) Gabriel Dubitzky	6–3, 6–1, 2–6, 6–4.
1960	(Israel) Eleazar Davidman (2)	(Israel) Arie Avidan-Weiss	6–1, 3–6, 4–6, 6–2, 6–2.
1961	(United States) Donald Dell	(United States) Myron Franks	13–11, 6–4, 6–3.
1962	(Australia) Alan Lane	(Israel) Eleazar Davidman	6–1, 6–1, 9–7.
1963	(Israel) Eleazar Davidman (3)	(Israel) Gabriel Dubitzky	6–4, 6–4, 7–5.
1964	(Australia) Alan Lane (2)	(Israel) Eleazar Davidman	6–4, 6–3, 6–2.
1965	(United States) Allen E. Fox	(United States) Donald Dell	6–4, 8–6, 7–5.
1966	(Romania) Günther Bosch	(Romania) Constantin Popovici	6–1, 6–4.
1967	(New Zealand) Ron McKenzie	(South Africa) Jackie Saul	6–4, 3–6, 0–6, 8–6, 6–2.
1968	(Australia) Ian Fletcher	(Israel) Eleazar Davidman	6–4, 8–6, 6–4.
↓ Open era ↓
1969	(United States) Bill Tym	(Israel) Eleazar Davidman	6–4, 6–4, 6–4.
↓ ILTF Independent Circuit ↓
1970	(West Germany) Uwe Gottschalk	(South Africa) Julian Krinsky	1–6, 7–5, 6–4, 6–1.
1972	(Australia) Ian Fletcher (2)	(Romania) Petre Mărmureanu	6–4, 6–4.
1973	(Romania) Ionel Sânteiu	(Australia) Paul Kronk	4–6, 7–5, 6–2, 5–7, 6–3.
1974	(Australia) Bob Rheinberger	(United States) Lee Tomlinson	6–3, 6–7, 6–2.
1976	(Rhodesia) Colin Dowdeswell	(Canada) Réjean Genois	6–2, 6–0.
1978	(West Germany) Ulrich Marten	(Israel) Shlomo Glickstein	6–3, 3–6, 6–2.

=== Women's singles ===
(incomplete roll)

Year	Winners	Runners-up	Score
↓ ILTF World Circuit ↓
1956	(Israel) Bracha Singer Jeremitsky	(Belgium) Colette Holvoet	6–4, 8–6
1957	(Belgium) Colette Holvoet	(Israel) Rita Fichman	6–1, 6–4
1958	(Belgium) Colette Holvoet (2)	(Israel) Palma Winkler	6–2, 6–1
1959	(Israel) Edna Deutsch	(Israel) Palma Winkler	6–4, 7–5
1960	(Israel) Edna Porat	(Israel) Leora Zuravsky	6–1, 3–6, 6–2
1961	(Israel) Tova Epstein	(Israel) Leora Zuravsky	7–5, 6–2
1963	(Israel) Tova Epstein (2)	(Israel) Leora Zuravsky	5–7, 6–2, 6–0
1964	(Israel) Tova Epstein (3)	(Israel) Magda Werzberger	7–5, 6–0
1965	(Israel) Tova Epstein (4)	(Israel) Mara Cohen Mintz	6–3, 6–2
1967	(South Africa) Annette Van Zyl	(South Africa) Laura Rossouw	6–3, 6–2
1968	(South Africa) Laura Rossouw	(United States) Nadine Netter	6–2, 6–0
↓ Open era ↓
1969	(United States) Alice Tym	(Israel) Tova Epstein	6–4, 6–1
1970	(Romania) Judith Dibar	(Australia) Helen Amos	6–2, 6–0
1971	(West Germany) Kora Schediwy	(Czechoslovakia) Alena Palmeová	3–6, 6–3, 6–4
1972	(Australia) Vicki Lancaster-Kerr	(Australia) Mandy Morgan	7–5, 6–3
↓ ILTF Independent Circuit ↓
1973	(Israel) Paulina Peisachov	(West Germany) Kora Schediwy	7–6, 6–3
1974	(New Zealand) Judy Chaloner	(Australia) Norma Eastburn	6–2, 6–1

== See also ==
- Israel Autumn International Championships
- Category:National and multi-national tennis tournaments
