= Marcos Gambus =

Venezuelan tennis player

- Country (sports): Venezuela
- Born: 12 February 1934; Tucupita, Venezuela

Singles

Grand Slam singles results
- US Open: 1R (1960)
Medal record
Central American and Caribbean Games
Silver medal – second place	1962 Kingston	Men's doubles

Marcos Gambus (born 12 February 1934) is a Venezuelan former tennis player.

Born in Tucupita, Gambus represented Venezuela at the 1955 Pan American Games in Mexico City.

Gambus featured in three Davis Cup ties for Venezuela during his career, between 1958 and 1960. Two of those ties were against the United States and he lost all of these rubbers in straight sets. He fared better when Venezuela played against New Zealand in 1960, with a win partnering Isaías Pimentel in the doubles, which was preceded by a five-set singles loss to Lew Gerrard.

In his only grand slam main draw appearance, Gambus fell in the first round of the 1960 U.S. National Championships to Gerald Moss.

Gambus was a men's doubles silver medalist at the 1962 Central American and Caribbean Games, with Juan Notz as his partner.
