= Juan Notz =

Venezuelan tennis player (born 1939)

- Country (sports): Venezuela
- Born: 21 October 1939 (age 85); Caracas, Venezuela

Singles

Grand Slam singles results
- US Open: 1R (1959)
Medal record
Central American and Caribbean Games
Silver medal – second place	1962 Kingston	Men's doubles
Bronze medal – third place	1959 Caracas	Mixed doubles

Juan Notz (born 21 October 1939) is a Venezuelan former tennis player.

Notz made his only Davis Cup appearance for Venezuela in his birth city of Caracas, against Ecuador in 1963. He lost the opening rubber of the tie to Eduardo Zuleta, before teaming up with Isaías Pimentel in the doubles to defeat Zuleta and Pancho Guzmán. In the reverse singles he won a dead rubber over Guzman in four sets.

A two-time doubles medalist at the Central American and Caribbean Games, Notz also represented Venezuela in two editions of the Pan American Games, in 1959 and 1963.
