= 1960 Davis Cup =

1960 edition of the Davis Cup

Details
- Duration: 4 April – 28 December 1960
- Edition: 49th
- Teams: 40

Champion
- Winning nation: Australia

The 1960 Davis Cup was the 49th edition of the Davis Cup, the most important tournament between national teams in men's tennis. 28 teams entered the Europe Zone, 6 teams entered the America Zone, and 6 teams entered the Eastern Zone. South Korea made its first appearance in the tournament.

The United States defeated Venezuela in the Americas Inter-Zonal final, the Philippines defeated India in the Eastern Zone final, and Italy defeated Sweden in the Europe Zone final. In the Inter-Zonal Zone, the United States defeated the Philippines in the semifinal, and then Italy defeated the United States in the final. In the Challenge Round Italy were defeated by the defending champions Australia. The final was played at White City Stadium in Sydney on 26–28 December. It was Italy's first appearance in a Davis Cup final, and it was the first final not to feature the United States since 1936.

== America Zone ==
=== North & Central America Zone ===
Semifinals; 15–17 July
Mexico
bye
Quebec City, Canada (clay)
Canada	0
United States	5

Final; 6–9 August
Mexico City, Mexico (clay)
Mexico	2
United States	3

=== South America Zone ===
Semifinals; 16–18 July
Venezuela
bye
Port of Spain, Trinidad and Tobago (clay)
Caribbean/West Indies	0
New Zealand	5

Final; 22–24 July
Caracas, Venezuela
Venezuela	3
New Zealand	2

=== Americas Inter-Zonal Final ===
United States vs. Venezuela

United States
5
Cleveland Skating Club, Cleveland, OH, United States
16–18 September 1960
Clay

Venezuela
0

			1	2	3	4	5
1	(United States) (Venezuela)	Tut Bartzen; Isaías Pimentel	6; 0	6; 1	6; 1
2	(United States) (Venezuela)	Barry MacKay; Marcos Gambus	6; 1	6; 1	6; 0
3	(United States) (Venezuela)	Butch Buchholz / Chuck McKinley; Marcos Gambus / Isaías Pimentel	4; 6	1; 6	5; 7
4	(United States) (Venezuela)	Tut Bartzen; Marcos Gambus	6; 1	6; 0	6; 0
5	(United States) (Venezuela)	Barry MacKay; Isaías Pimentel	6; 3	6; 3	6; 3

== Eastern Zone ==
=== Draw ===
Quarterfinals; 4–6 April
Philippines
bye
Tokyo, Japan
Japan	5
South Korea	0
Colombo, Ceylon (clay)
India	5
Ceylon	0
bye
Thailand

Semifinals; 22–24 April
Manila, Philippines
Philippines	3
Japan	2
Bangkok, Thailand
India	5
Thailand	0

Final; 27–29 May
Manila, Philippines
Philippines	3
India	0

=== Final ===
Philippines vs. India

Philippines
3
Manila, Philippines
27–29 May 1960

India
0

			1	2	3	4	5
1	(Philippines) (India)	Raymundo Deyro; Naresh Kumar	6; 0	6; 1	6; 1
2	(Philippines) (India)	Felicisimo Ampon; Ramanathan Krishnan	6; 3	8; 6	6; 1
3	(Philippines) (India)	Eduardo Dungo / Juan-Johnson José; Ramanathan Krishnan / Naresh Kumar	6; 2	6; 2	6; 2
4	(Philippines) (India)	Felicisimo Ampon; Naresh Kumar						not played
5	(Philippines) (India)	Raymundo Deyro; Ramanathan Krishnan						not played

== Europe Zone ==
=== Draw ===
First Round; 22 April–2 May
Italy
bye
Hungary	5
Ireland	0
Luxembourg	2
Monaco	3
Israel	1
Chile	4
Switzerland	2
Belgium	3
Brazil	w/o
Turkey
Norway	2
Netherlands	3
bye
Great Britain
France
bye
Finland	0
Argentina	5
Denmark	3
Yugoslavia	2
Egypt	1
Austria	4
West Germany	3
Czechoslovakia	2
Romania	2
Poland	3
Sweden	5
South Africa	0
bye
Spain

Second Round; 13–15 May
Budapest, Hungary
Italy	3
Hungary	2
Monte Carlo, Monaco
Monaco	2
Chile	3
Brussels, Belgium
Belgium	3
Brazil	2
Scheveningen, Netherlands (clay)
Netherlands	0
Great Britain	5
Paris, France (clay)
France	5
Argentina	0
Vienna, Austria (clay)
Denmark	3
Austria	2
Warsaw, Poland
West Germany	4
Poland	1
Stockholm, Sweden (clay)
Sweden	3
Spain	2

Quarterfinals; 10–12 June
Turin, Italy (clay)
Italy	3
Chile	2
Scarborough, England (grass)
Belgium	0
Great Britain	5
Paris, France (clay)
France	5
Denmark	0
Düsseldorf, West Germany (clay)
West Germany	1
Sweden	4

Semifinals; 15–17 July
Wimbledon, England (grass)
Italy	4
Great Britain	1
Båstad, Sweden (clay)
France	2
Sweden	3

Final; 29–31 July
Båstad, Sweden (clay)
Italy	3
Sweden	2

=== Final ===
Sweden vs. Italy

Sweden
2
Båstad Tennis Stadium, Båstad, Sweden
29–31 July 1960
Clay

Italy
3

			1	2	3	4	5
1	(Sweden) (Italy)	Jan-Erik Lundqvist; Orlando Sirola	6; 4	4; 6	6; 3	6; 3
2	(Sweden) (Italy)	Ulf Schmidt; Nicola Pietrangeli	1; 6	4; 6	6; 4	4; 6
3	(Sweden) (Italy)	Jan-Erik Lundqvist / Ulf Schmidt; Nicola Pietrangeli / Orlando Sirola	16; 14	7; 5	2; 6	3; 6	2; 6
4	(Sweden) (Italy)	Ulf Schmidt; Orlando Sirola	4; 6	2; 6	1; 6
5	(Sweden) (Italy)	Jan-Erik Lundqvist; Sergio Tacchini	6; 2	6; 1	6; 1

== Inter-Zonal Zone ==
=== Draw ===
Semifinals; 22–24 November
EUR	Italy
bye
Brisbane, Australia (grass)
AME	United States	5
EAS	Philippines	0

Final; 9–12 December
Perth, Australia (grass)
EUR	Italy	3
AME	United States	2

=== Semifinals ===
Philippines vs. United States

Philippines
0
Milton Courts, Brisbane, Australia
22–24 November 1960
Grass

United States
5

			1	2	3	4	5
1	(Philippines) (United States)	Eduardo Dungo; Barry MacKay	1; 6	2; 6	0; 6
2	(Philippines) (United States)	Juan-Johnson José; Butch Buchholz	7; 5	1; 6	0; 6	2; 6
3	(Philippines) (United States)	Eduardo Dungo / Juan-Johnson José; Chuck McKinley / Dennis Ralston	3; 6	3; 6	3; 6
4	(Philippines) (United States)	Raymundo Deyro; Dennis Ralston	2; 6	0; 6	5; 7
5	(Philippines) (United States)	Felicisimo Ampon; Chuck McKinley	3; 6	4; 6	2; 6

=== Final ===
Italy vs. United States

Italy
3
Royal King's Park, Perth, Australia
9–12 December 1960
Grass

United States
2

			1	2	3	4	5
1	(Italy) (United States)	Orlando Sirola; Butch Buchholz	8; 6	5; 7	9; 11	2; 6
2	(Italy) (United States)	Nicola Pietrangeli; Barry MacKay	6; 8	6; 3	10; 8	6; 8	11; 13
3	(Italy) (United States)	Nicola Pietrangeli / Orlando Sirola; Butch Buchholz / Chuck McKinley	3; 6	10; 8	6; 4	13; 11
4	(Italy) (United States)	Nicola Pietrangeli; Butch Buchholz	6; 1	6; 2	6; 8	3; 6	6; 4
5	(Italy) (United States)	Orlando Sirola; Barry MacKay (tennis)	9; 7	6; 3	8; 6

== Challenge Round ==
Australia vs. Italy

Australia
4
White City Stadium, Sydney, Australia
26–28 December 1960
Grass

Italy
1

			1	2	3	4	5
1	(Australia) (Italy)	Neale Fraser; Orlando Sirola	4; 6	6; 3	6; 3	6; 3
2	(Australia) (Italy)	Rod Laver; Nicola Pietrangeli	8; 6	6; 4	6; 3
3	(Australia) (Italy)	Roy Emerson / Neale Fraser; Nicola Pietrangeli / Orlando Sirola	10; 8	5; 7	6; 2	6; 4
4	(Australia) (Italy)	Rod Laver; Orlando Sirola	9; 7	6; 2	6; 3
5	(Australia) (Italy)	Neale Fraser; Nicola Pietrangeli	9; 11	3; 6	6; 1	2; 6
