= 1963 Davis Cup =

1963 edition of the Davis Cup

Details
- Duration: 17 March – 28 December 1963
- Edition: 52nd
- Teams: 49

Champion
- Winning nation: United States

The 1963 Davis Cup was the 52nd edition of the Davis Cup, the most important tournament between national teams in men's tennis. 32 teams entered the Europe Zone, 9 teams entered the Eastern Zone, and 7 teams entered the America Zone. Rhodesia made its first appearance in the tournament.

The United States defeated Venezuela in the America Zone final, India defeated Japan in the Eastern Zone final, and Great Britain defeated Sweden in the Europe Zone final. In the Inter-Zonal Zone, the United States defeated Great Britain in the semifinal, and then defeated India in the final. The United States then defeated the defending champions Australia in the Challenge Round, ending Australia's four-year title run. The final was played at Memorial Drive Park in Adelaide, Australia on 26–28 December.

== America Zone ==
=== Draw ===
Quarterfinals; 13–17 June; 26–28 July
Venezuela
bye
Guayaquil, Ecuador (clay)
Ecuador	3
Caribbean/West Indies	2
Tehran, Iran
Iran	0
United States	5
Vancouver, Canada (hard)
Canada	1
Mexico	4

Semifinals; 28–30 July; 16–18 August
Caracas, Venezuela (hard)
Venezuela	3
Ecuador	1
Los Angeles, CA, United States (hard)
United States	4
Mexico	1

Final; 13–15 September
Denver, CO, United States (hard)
Venezuela	0
United States	5

=== Final ===
United States vs. Venezuela

United States
5
Cherry Hills Country Club, Denver, CO, United States
13–15 September 1963
Hard

Venezuela
0

			1	2	3	4	5
1	(United States) (Venezuela)	Dennis Ralston; Orlando Bracamonte	6; 2	6; 1	6; 2
2	(United States) (Venezuela)	Marty Riessen; Isaías Pimentel	8; 6	6; 4	6; 4
3	(United States) (Venezuela)	Dennis Ralston / Marty Riessen; Orlando Bracamonte / Isaías Pimentel	7; 5	8; 6	6; 3
4	(United States) (Venezuela)	Arthur Ashe; Orlando Bracamonte	6; 1	6; 1	6; 0
5	(United States) (Venezuela)	Dennis Ralston; Isaías Pimentel	18; 16	9; 7	6; 4

== Eastern Zone ==
=== Draw ===
First Round; 17–19 March
Colombo, a (clay) is
Ceylon	0
Pakistan	4

Quarterfinals; 27 March–7 April
Poona, India
Pakistan	1
India	4
Kuala Lumpur, Malaya
Malaya	3
Burma	2
Fukuoka, Japan
Japan	5
South Korea	0
Manila, Philippines
New Zealand	1
Philippines	3

Semifinals; 19–22 April
Kuala Lumpur, Malaya
India	4
Malaya	0
Tokyo, Japan
Japan	4
Philippines	1

Final; 4–6 May
Tokyo, Japan
India	3
Japan	2

=== Final ===
Japan vs. India

Japan
2
Tokyo, Japan
3–7 May 1963

India
3

			1	2	3	4	5
1	(Japan) (India)	Atsushi Miyagi; Ramanathan Krishnan	5; 7	6; 4	0; 6	0; 6
2	(Japan) (India)	Osamu Ishiguro; Jaidip Mukerjea	6; 2	6; 3	6; 2
3	(Japan) (India)	Michio Fujii / Atsushi Miyagi; Premjit Lall / Jaidip Mukerjea	6; 4	3; 6	2; 6	5; 7
4	(Japan) (India)	Osamu Ishiguro; Ramanathan Krishnan	2; 6	5; 7
5	(Japan) (India)	Atsushi Miyagi; Jaidip Mukerjea	6; 3	6; 2	3; 6	7; 5

== Europe Zone ==
=== Draw ===
Preliminary Round; 12–22 April
Istanbul, Turkey
Turkey	1
Israel	4
Estoril, Portugal (clay)
Portugal	3
Luxembourg	2
Beirut, Lebanon (clay)
Lebanon	0
Egypt	5
Dublin, Ireland
Ireland	2
Greece	3

Semifinals

Final

First Round; 3–5 May
Sweden
bye
Rhodesia	4
Netherlands	1
Yugoslavia	5
Monaco	0
Austria	5
Israel	0
South Africa
bye
Romania	5
Switzerland	0
Denmark	4
Czechoslovakia	1
Norway	5
Portugal	0
Egypt	0
Chile	5
Soviet Union	5
Finland	0
Hungary	2
Belgium	3
bye
Great Britain
Greece	2
Brazil	3
Poland	0
France	5
Spain	3
West Germany	2
bye
Italy

Second Round; 24 May–4 June
Stockholm, Sweden (clay)
Sweden	3
Rhodesia	2
Zagreb, Yugoslavia
Yugoslavia	5
Austria	0
Bucharest, Romania (clay)
South Africa	3
Romania	2
Copenhagen, Denmark (clay)
Denmark	4
Norway	1
Moscow, Soviet Union
Chile	1
Soviet Union	4
Brussels, Belgium (clay)
Belgium	0
Great Britain	5
Paris, France (clay)
Brazil	1
France	4
Barcelona, Spain (clay)
Spain	4
Italy	1

Quarterfinals; 13–16 June
Stockholm, Sweden (clay)
Sweden	4
Yugoslavia	1
Copenhagen, Denmark (clay)
South Africa	4
Denmark	1
Eastbourne, England (grass)
Soviet Union	1
Great Britain	4
Barcelona, Spain (clay)
France	1
Spain	4

Semifinals; 18–21 July
Båstad, Sweden (clay)
Sweden	5
South Africa	0
Bristol, England (grass)
Great Britain	4
Spain	1

Final; 1–5 August
Wimbledon, England (grass)
Sweden	2
Great Britain	3

=== Final ===
Great Britain vs. Sweden

Great Britain
3
No. 1 Court, All England Club, Wimbledon, England
1–5 August 1963
Grass

Sweden
2

			1	2	3	4	5
1	(United Kingdom) (Sweden)	Mike Sangster; Jan-Erik Lundqvist	3; 6	6; 2	4; 6	12; 10	9; 7
2	(United Kingdom) (Sweden)	Bobby Wilson; Ulf Schmidt	4; 6	6; 4	4; 6	6; 4	4; 6
3	(United Kingdom) (Sweden)	Mike Sangster / Bobby Wilson; Jan-Erik Lundqvist / Ulf Schmidt	22; 20	6; 4	6; 3
4	(United Kingdom) (Sweden)	Bobby Wilson; Jan-Erik Lundqvist	6; 3	6; 2	2; 6	2; 6	1; 6
5	(United Kingdom) (Sweden)	Mike Sangster; Ulf Schmidt	7; 5	6; 2	9; 11	3; 6	6; 3

== Inter-Zonal Zone ==
=== Draw ===
Semifinals; 26–28 September
EAS	India
bye
Bournemouth, England (clay)
AME	United States	5
EUR	Great Britain	0

Final; 2–4 November
Bombay, India
EAS	India	0
AME	United States	5

=== Semifinals ===
Great Britain vs. United States

Great Britain
0
West Hants Lawn Tennis Club, Bournemouth, England
26–28 September 1963
Clay

United States
5

			1	2	3	4	5
1	(United Kingdom) (United States)	Mike Sangster; Chuck McKinley	5; 7	2; 6	5; 7
2	(United Kingdom) (United States)	Billy Knight; Frank Froehling	6; 4	6; 8	4; 6	4; 6
3	(United Kingdom) (United States)	Mike Sangster / Bobby Wilson; Chuck McKinley / Dennis Ralston	4; 6	8; 6	7; 9	2; 6
4	(United Kingdom) (United States)	Billy Knight; Chuck McKinley	6; 8	2; 6	3; 6
5	(United Kingdom) (United States)	Mike Sangster; Frank Froehling	1; 6	6; 4	0; 6	4; 6

=== Final ===
India vs. United States

India
0
Cricket Club of India, Bombay, India
2–4 November 1963

United States
5

			1	2	3	4	5
1	(India) (United States)	Premjit Lall; Chuck McKinley	4; 6	3; 6	0; 6
2	(India) (United States)	Ramanathan Krishnan; Dennis Ralston	4; 6	1; 6	11; 13
3	(India) (United States)	Premjit Lall / Jaidip Mukerjea; Chuck McKinley / Dennis Ralston	8; 6	3; 6	10; 12	4; 6
4	(India) (United States)	Premjit Lall; Marty Riessen	3; 6	6; 2	0; 6	1; 6
5	(India) (United States)	Ramanathan Krishnan; Chuck McKinley	8; 10	8; 6	2; 6	6; 2	0; 6

== Challenge Round ==
Australia vs. United States

Australia
2
Memorial Drive Park, Adelaide, Australia
26–28 December 1963
Grass

United States
3

			1	2	3	4	5
1	(Australia) (United States)	John Newcombe; Dennis Ralston	4; 6	1; 6	6; 3	6; 4	5; 7
2	(Australia) (United States)	Roy Emerson; Chuck McKinley	6; 3	3; 6	7; 5	7; 5
3	(Australia) (United States)	Roy Emerson / Neale Fraser; Chuck McKinley / Dennis Ralston	3; 6	6; 4	9; 11	9; 11
4	(Australia) (United States)	Roy Emerson; Dennis Ralston	6; 2	6; 3	3; 6	6; 2
5	(Australia) (United States)	John Newcombe; Chuck McKinley	12; 10	2; 6	7; 9	2; 6
