= Eleazar Davidman =

Israeli tennis player

- Native name: אלעזר דודמן
- Country (sports): Israel
- Residence: Israel
- Born: 9 December 1936
- Died: October 2007 (aged 70)

Singles
- Career record: 0–0

Grand Slam singles results
- Australian Open: 2R (1964)
- French Open: 1R (1965)
- Wimbledon: 1R (1966)
- US Open: 2R (1964)

Doubles
- Career record: 0–0

Grand Slam doubles results
- Australian Open: 2R (1964)

Eleazar Davidman (also Elazar Davidman, Hebrew: אלעזר דודמן; 9 December 1936 – October 2007) was a Jewish Israeli tennis player.

== Tennis career ==
Davidman competed in men's singles and men's doubles in tennis for Israel at the 1953 Maccabiah Games. He competed for Israel in men's singles at the 1961 Maccabiah Games, defeating American Sidney Schwartz in the third round.

Starting in 1956 Davidman played 39 matches for the Israel Davis Cup team in Davis Cup competition, going 12–20 in singles and 5–12 in doubles, over the course of 17 ties. He was Israel's top tennis player beginning in that year, and their first international-level player.

In 1964 he competed in the Australian Open, making it to the second round in both singles and in doubles, with Lưu Hoàng Đức of South Vietnam.

== See also ==
- Sports in Israel
