= Isaías Pimentel =

Venezuelan tennis player (1933–2017)

Iyo Pimentel
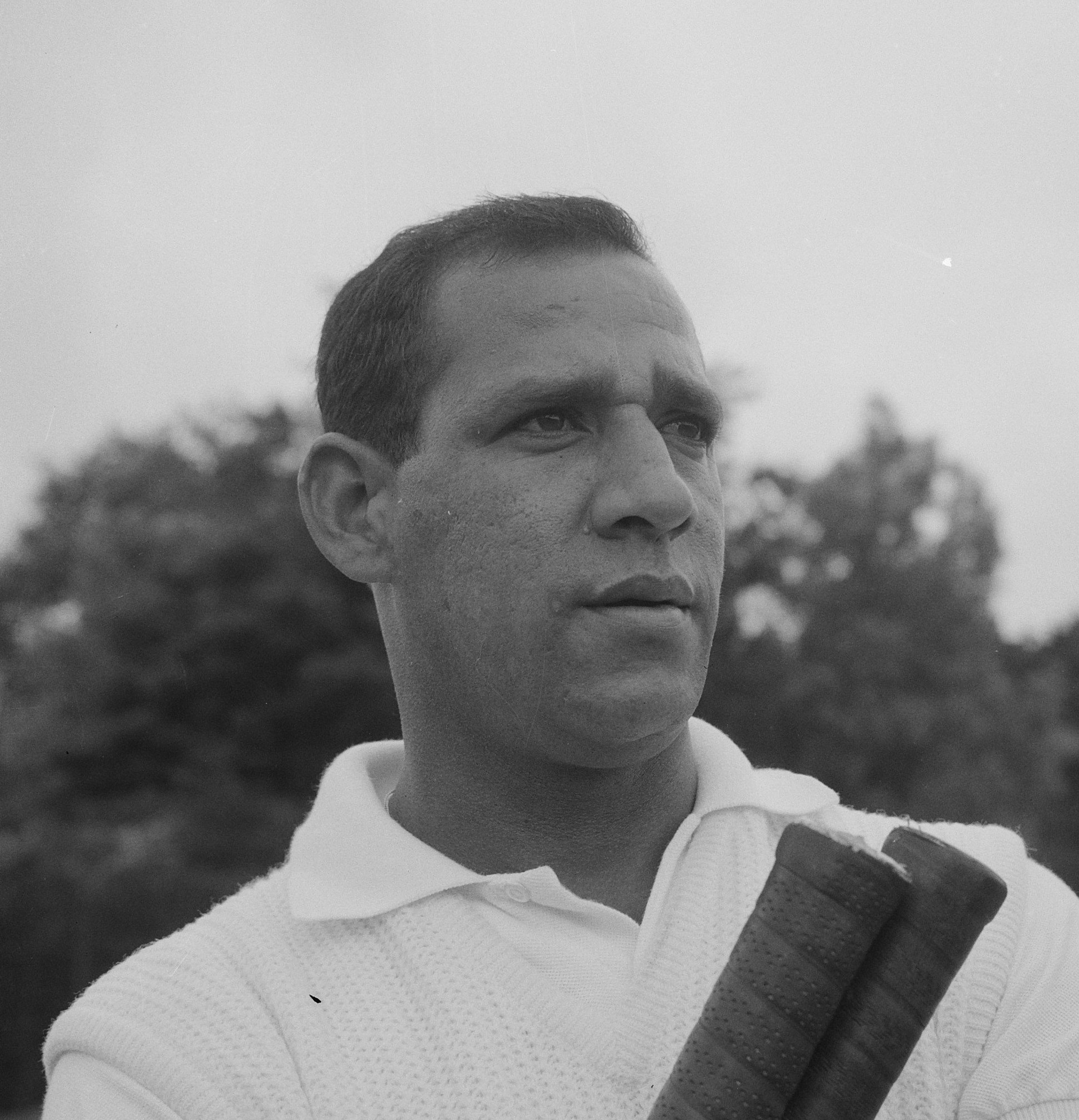
- Pimentel in 1965
- Full name: Isaías S. Pimentel
- Country (sports): Venezuela
- Born: 16 February 1933 Curaçao
- Died: 26 June 2017 (aged 84)
- Turned pro: 1952 (amateur tour)
- Retired: 1974

Singles
- Career record: 218–171
- Career titles: 6

Grand Slam singles results
- French Open: 3R (1958, 1964)
- Wimbledon: QF (1961)
- US Open: 3R (1960)

Doubles
- Career record: 0–0

Grand Slam doubles results
- Wimbledon: 1R (1955, 1956, 1957, 1958, 1961, 1962, 1964, 1965)

Grand Slam mixed doubles results
- Wimbledon: 4R (1957)

Team competitions
- Davis Cup: F^{Am} (1960, 1963)

Isaías "Iyo" S. Pimentel (16 February 1933 – 26 June 2017) was a Curaçaoan-born Venezuelan tennis player. An international player, he was a quarter finalist in singles at the 1961 Wimbledon Championships. He was active from 1952 to 1974, and won 6 career singles titles.

== Biography ==
Born on the Dutch island of Curaçao, on 16 February 1933, Pimentel was three times Curaçaoan champion. He played his first senior tournament at the Colombian International in 1952. In 1955, whilst on tour in Great Britain he won his first singles title at the Worcestershire Championships on grass against Arsenio Motolko. In 1956 he won the singles title at the Santander International in Spain against Juan Manuel Couder. In 1958, he won the singles title at the Hoylake and West Kirby Open in England against Roy Stilwell.

In 1965, he won the singles title at the Campeonato Bolivariano (Bolivian Championships) against Miguel Olvera. In 1971, he won his final singles title at the Centro Italiano-Venezolano Championship against Ismael Sauce. He played his final tournament at the Caribbean Cup where he was beaten in the quarter finals. In addition he was a finalist at the East of Ireland Championships in 1957, the Real Madrid International in 1958, the Hollywood Beach Invitation in 1958, the Chile International in 1962, Oostende in 1962, and the Santpoort International in 1965. He also competed in the Davis Cup, representing Venezuela, a number of times, from 1957 to 1966.

Pimentel died on 26 June 2017, aged 84, in Willemstad.
