= 1973 Australian Open – Women's singles =

Women's singles
- 1973 Australian Open

Final
- Champion: (Australia) Margaret Court
- Runner-up: (Australia) Evonne Goolagong
- Score: 6–4, 7–5

Details
- Draw: 48
- Seeds: 12

Events
Singles	men	women		boys	girls
Doubles	men	women	mixed	boys	girls
WC Singles	men	women	quad
WC Doubles	men	women	quad
Legends	men	women	mixed
- Australian Open

Margaret Court defeated Evonne Goolagong in the final, 6–4, 7–5 to win the women's singles tennis title at the 1973 Australian Open. It was her eleventh Australian Open singles title and 22nd major singles title overall. Court did not lose a set during the tournament.

Virginia Wade was the defending champion, but she lost to Kazuko Sawamatsu in the quarterfinals.

== Seeds ==
The seeded players are listed below. Margaret Court is the champion; others show the round in which they were eliminated.

1. (Australia) Margaret Court (champion)
2. (Australia) Evonne Goolagong (finalist)
3. (United Kingdom) Virginia Wade (quarterfinals)
4. (Australia) Kerry Melville (semifinals)
5. (Australia) Patricia Coleman (second round)
6. (Japan) Kazuko Sawamatsu (semifinals)
7. (Australia) Kerry Harris (quarterfinals)
8. (Australia) Karen Krantzcke (quarterfinals)
9. (Soviet Union) Eugenia Birioukova (third round)
10. (Australia) Barbara Hawcroft (third round)
11. (Australia) Marilyn Tesch (third round)
12. (Australia) Janet Young (second round)

== Draw ==
=== Key ===
- Q = Qualifier
- WC = Wild card
- LL = Lucky loser
- r = Retired

=== Finals ===
Quarterfinals
1	(Australia) Margaret Court	6	6
8	(Australia) Karen Krantzcke	4	3
(Australia) Dianne Fromholtz	1	3
4	(Australia) Kerry Melville	6	6
3	(United Kingdom) Virginia Wade	6	1	4
6	(Japan) Kazuko Sawamatsu	0	6	6
7	(Australia) Kerry Harris	4	3
2	(Australia) Evonne Goolagong	6	6

Semifinals
1	(Australia) Margaret Court	6	6
4	(Australia) Kerry Melville	1	0
6	(Japan) Kazuko Sawamatsu	4	3
2	(Australia) Evonne Goolagong	6	6

Finals
1	(Australia) Margaret Court	6	7
2	(Australia) Evonne Goolagong	4	5

=== Earlier rounds ===
==== Section 1 ====
First round
(France) N Fuchs	5	6	6
(Australia) L Mansfield	7	2	1
(Australia) B Dart	6	6
(Australia) K Walker	4	3
Q	(Australia) H Worland	6	7
(Australia) D James	2	5
(South Korea) Lee D-h	6	7
(Australia) P Whytcross	4	5

Second round
1	(Australia) M Court	6	6
(France) N Fuchs	0	0
(Australia) B Dart	2	6	6
(Australia) K Hogarth	6	3	2
9	(Soviet Union) E Birioukova	6	6
Q	(Australia) H Worland	0	1
(South Korea) Lee D-h	3	5
8	(Australia) K Krantzcke	6	7

Third round
1	(Australia) M Court	6	6
(Australia) B Dart	0	0
9	(Soviet Union) E Birioukova	1	5
8	(Australia) K Krantzcke	6	7

Quarterfinals
1	(Australia) M Court	6	6
8	(Australia) K Krantzcke	4	3

==== Section 2 ====
First round
(Australia) D Fromholtz	6	6
LL	(Australia) H Young	1	2
(Australia) W Turnbull	6	5	6
LL	(Australia) K Williams	0	7	3
(Australia) M Whitely	6	6
(South Korea) Lee S-o	4	4
(Australia) C Doerner	6	6
(Australia) L Walker	2	1

Second round
5	(Australia) P Coleman	2	1
(Australia) D Fromholtz	6	6
(Australia) W Turnbull
12	(Australia) J Young	w/o
(United Kingdom) G Coles	6	6
(Australia) M Whitely	2	1
(Australia) C Doerner	4	2
4	(Australia) K Melville	6	6

Third round
(Australia) D Fromholtz	6	6
(Australia) W Turnbull	3	2
(United Kingdom) G Coles	1	2
4	(Australia) K Melville	6	6

Quarterfinals
(Australia) D Fromholtz	1	3
4	(Australia) K Melville	6	6

==== Section 3 ====
First round
(Australia) C Matison	7	6
(Australia) K Wilkinson	5	1
LL	(France) M Proisy	6	6
(Denmark) D Ekner	4	4
(Australia) M Pratt	7	2	6
(Rhodesia) J Walker	6	6	4
(United Kingdom) L Blachford	7	6
(Australia) S Irvine	6	3

Second round
3	(United Kingdom) V Wade	6	6
(Australia) C Matison	0	0
LL	(France) M Proisy	1	2
(Australia) L Bowrey	6	6
11	(Australia) M Tesch	6	7
(Australia) M Pratt	2	6
(United Kingdom) L Blachford	3	6	1
6	(Japan) K Sawamatsu	6	2	6

Third round
3	(United Kingdom) V Wade	6	6
(Australia) L Bowrey	1	1
11	(Australia) M Tesch	3	2
6	(Japan) K Sawamatsu	6	6

Quarterfinals
3	(United Kingdom) V Wade	6	1	4
6	(Japan) K Sawamatsu	0	6	6

==== Section 4 ====
First round
(Belgium) M Van Haver	6	6
(Japan) K Nomura	1	2
(Australia) M Morgan	6	6
(Australia) J Whyte	3	1
(United Kingdom) L Charles	7	5	6
(Australia) C O'Neil	6	7	2
(South Korea) Yang J-s	6	6
(Australia) H Crozier	2	4

Second round
7	(Australia) K Harris	6	6
(Belgium) M Van Haver	2	4
(Australia) M Morgan	1	6	2
10	(Australia) B Hawcroft	6	1	6
(Belgium) M Gurdal	6	3	2
(United Kingdom) L Charles	3	6	6
(South Korea) Yang J-s	3	1
2	(Australia) E Goolagong	6	6

Third round
7	(Australia) K Harris	6	6
10	(Australia) B Hawcroft	0	2
(United Kingdom) L Charles	7	4	2
2	(Australia) E Goolagong	6	6	6

Quarterfinals
7	(Australia) K Harris	4	3
2	(Australia) E Goolagong	6	6

Preceded by 1972 US Open – Women's singles	Grand Slam women's singles	Succeeded by 1973 French Open – Women's singles
