= 1972 Australian Open – Women's singles =

Women's singles
- 1972 Australian Open

Final
- Champion: (United Kingdom) Virginia Wade
- Runner-up: (Australia) Evonne Goolagong
- Score: 6–4, 6–4

Details
- Draw: 32
- Seeds: 8

Events
Singles	men	women		boys	girls
Doubles	men	women	mixed	boys	girls
- Australian Open

Virginia Wade defeated Evonne Goolagong in the final, 6–4, 6–4 to win the women's singles tennis title at the 1972 Australian Open. It was her second major singles title. Wade was making her tournament debut.

Margaret Court was the three-time reigning champion, but did not compete this year due to pregnancy.

== Seeds ==
A champion seed is indicated in bold text while text in italics indicates the round in which that seed was eliminated.

1. (Australia) Evonne Goolagong (final)
2. (United Kingdom) **Virginia Wade (champion)**
3. (France) Gail Chanfreau (quarterfinals)
4. (Australia) Helen Gourlay (semifinals)
5. (Soviet Union) Olga Morozova (quarterfinals)
6. (Australia) Kerry Harris (semifinals)
7. (Australia) Karen Krantzcke (second round)
8. (Australia) Barbara Hawcroft (quarterfinals)

== Draw ==
Key

- Q = Qualifier
- WC = Wild card
- LL = Lucky loser
- Alt = Alternate
- ITF = ITF entry
- PR = Protected ranking
- SR = Special ranking
- SE = Special exempt
- JE = Junior exempt
- JR = Junior Accelerator Programme entrant
- CO = College Accelerator Programme entrant
- NG = Next Gen Accelerator Program entrant
- w/o = Walkover
- r = Retired
- d = Defaulted

=== Finals ===
Quarterfinals
1	(Australia) **Evonne Goolagong**	**6**	3	**6**
8	(Australia) Barbara Hawcroft	1	**6**	1
4	(Australia) **Helen Gourlay**	**6**	**6**
5	(Soviet Union) Olga Morozova	1	2
6	(Australia) **Kerry Harris**	**6**	**7**
3	(France) Gail Chanfreau	3	6
(Australia) Patricia Coleman	2	2
2	(United Kingdom) **Virginia Wade**	**6**	**6**

Semifinals
1	(Australia) **Evonne Goolagong**	**6**	**7**
4	(Australia) Helen Gourlay	2	6
6	(Australia) Kerry Harris	6	**6**	0
2	(United Kingdom) **Virginia Wade**	**7**	2	**6**

Finals
1	(Australia) Evonne Goolagong	4	4
2	(United Kingdom) **Virginia Wade**	**6**	**6**

==== Section 1 ====
First round
1	(Australia) **E Goolagong**	**6**	**6**
(Australia) H Worland	0	1
(Australia) **J Whyte**	**6**	**6**
(Australia) A Coleman	4	2
(United States) **M Schallau**	**6**	**6**
(Australia) K Wilkinson	1	2
(Australia) D James	5	1
8	(Australia) **B Hawcroft**	**7**	**6**
4	(Australia) **H Gourlay**	**6**	**6**
(Australia) P Billing	1	2
(Australia) M Morgan	4	2
(Australia) **M Tesch**	**6**	**6**
(Australia) R Knobel	2	4
(Australia) **S Irvine**	**6**	**6**
(Australia) K Williams	0	1
5	(Soviet Union) **O Morozova**	**6**	**6**

Second round
1	(Australia) **E Goolagong**	**6**	**6**
(Australia) J Whyte	3	1
(United States) M Schallau	**7**	5	3
8	(Australia) **B Hawcroft**	5	**7**	**6**
4	(Australia) **H Gourlay**	**6**	**7**
(Australia) M Tesch	3	6
(Australia) S Irvine	5	**6**	1
5	(Soviet Union) **O Morozova**	**7**	4	**6**

Quarterfinals
1	(Australia) **E Goolagong**	**6**	3	**6**
8	(Australia) B Hawcroft	1	**6**	1
4	(Australia) **H Gourlay**	**6**	**6**
5	(Soviet Union) O Morozova	1	2

Semifinals
1	(Australia) **E Goolagong**	**6**	**7**
4	(Australia) H Gourlay	2	6

==== Section 2 ====
First round
6	(Australia) **K Harris**	**6**	**6**
(Australia) C Matison	3	2
(Australia) S Hole	0	4
(Australia) **W Turnbull**	**6**	**6**
(Australia) **J Young**	**6**	**6**
(United States) A Lebedeff	0	1
(Australia) B Dart	2	1
3	(France) **G Chanfreau**	**6**	**6**
7	(Australia) **K Krantzcke**	**6**	**6**
(Australia) P Whytcross	2	0
(Australia) **P Coleman**	**6**	**6**
(Australia) M Pratt	3	3
(Australia) **J Harris**	**6**	5	**6**
(Australia) P King	3	**7**	1
(Australia) C Norquay	3	1
2	(United Kingdom) **V Wade**	**6**	**6**

Second round
6	(Australia) **K Harris**	**6**	**7**
(Australia) W Turnbull	1	6
(Australia) J Young	5	**6**	1
3	(France) **G Chanfreau**	**7**	4	**6**
7	(Australia) K Krantzcke	6	**7**	1
(Australia) **P Coleman**	**7**	5	**6**
(Australia) J Harris	1	0
(United Kingdom) **V Wade**	**6**	**6**

Quarterfinals
6	(Australia) **K Harris**	**6**	**7**
3	(France) G Chanfreau	3	6
(Australia) **P Coleman**	2	2
2	(United Kingdom) **V Wade**	**6**	**6**

Semifinals
6	(Australia) K Harris	6	**6**	0
2	(United Kingdom) **V Wade**	**7**	2	**6**

Preceded by 1971 US Open – Women's singles	Grand Slam women's singles	Succeeded by 1972 French Open – Women's singles
