= 1973 Australian Open – Women's doubles =

Women's doubles
- 1973 Australian Open

Final
- Champions: (Australia) Margaret Court (United Kingdom) Virginia Wade
- Runners-up: (Australia) Kerry Harris (Australia) Kerry Melville
- Score: 6–4, 6–4

Details
- Draw: 22
- Seeds: 4

Events
Singles	men	women		boys	girls
Doubles	men	women	mixed	boys	girls
WC Singles	men	women	quad
WC Doubles	men	women	quad
Legends	men	women	mixed
- Australian Open

Helen Gourlay and Kerry Harris were the reigning champions. Gourlay did not compete. Harris and Kerry Melville reached the final, where they were defeated by Margaret Court and Virginia Wade.

== Seeds ==
1. (Australia) Margaret Court / (United Kingdom) Virginia Wade (champions)
2. (Australia) Evonne Goolagong / (Australia) Janet Young (semifinals)
3. (Australia) Kerry Harris / (Australia) Kerry Melville (final)
4. (Soviet Union) Eugenia Birioukova / (Australia) Karen Krantzcke (quarterfinals)

== Draw ==
Key

- Q = Qualifier
- WC = Wild card
- LL = Lucky loser
- Alt = Alternate
- ITF = ITF entry
- PR = Protected ranking
- SR = Special ranking
- SE = Special exempt
- JE = Junior exempt
- JR = Junior Accelerator Programme entrant
- CO = College Accelerator Programme entrant
- NG = Next Gen Accelerator Program entrant
- w/o = Walkover
- r = Retired
- d = Defaulted

=== Finals ===
Semifinals
1	(Australia) Margaret Court (United Kingdom) Virginia Wade	6	6
(Australia) Cynthia Doerner (Australia) Sally Irvine	1	3
3	(Australia) Kerry Harris (Australia) Kerry Melville	6	6
2	(Australia) Evonne Goolagong (Australia) Janet Young	2	4

Final
1	(Australia) Margaret Court (United Kingdom) Virginia Wade	6	6
3	(Australia) Kerry Harris (Australia) Kerry Melville	4	4

=== Top half ===
First round
(Australia) M Morgan (Australia) P Whytcross	6	6
(China) J Lin (Australia) P Southcombe	0	0
(Australia) K Wilkinson (Australia) K Williams	4	6	6
(Australia) P Ahern (Australia) B Dale	6	2	4
(Australia) K Hogarth (Australia) M Tesch	7	6
(United Kingdom) L Blachford (France) M Proisy	5	2

Second round
1	(Australia) M Court (United Kingdom) V Wade	6	6
(Australia) C Matison (Australia) H Young	3	1
(Australia) M Morgan (Australia) P Whytcross	w/o
(Australia) B Heavey (Australia) M Whitely
(Australia) C Doerner (Australia) S Irvine	6	6
(Australia) K Wilkinson (Australia) K Williams	0	2
(Australia) K Hogarth (Australia) M Tesch	4	3
4	(Soviet Union) E Birioukova (Australia) K Krantzcke	6	6

Quarterfinals
1	(Australia) M Court (United Kingdom) V Wade	6	6
(Australia) M Morgan (Australia) P Whytcross	1	1
(Australia) C Doerner (Australia) S Irvine	6	6
4	(Soviet Union) E Birioukova (Australia) K Krantzcke	4	1

Semifinals
1	(Australia) M Court (United Kingdom) V Wade	6	6
(Australia) C Doerner (Australia) S Irvine	1	3

=== Bottom half ===
First round
(Australia) D James (Australia) L Mansfield	2	3
(Australia) P Coleman (Australia) W Turnbull	6	6
(Denmark) D Ekner (France) N Fuchs	6	6
(South Korea) S-o Lee (South Korea) J-s Yang	2	3
(Belgium) M Gurdal (Belgium) M Van Haver	6	6
(Australia) J Glynn (Australia) M Liddle	2	2

Second round
3	(Australia) K Harris (Australia) K Melville	6	6
(Australia) M Arnott (Australia) S Arnott	1	1
(Australia) P Coleman (Australia) W Turnbull	6	6
(Australia) B Hawcroft (Japan) K Sawamatsu	1	4
(United Kingdom) L Charles (United Kingdom) G Coles	6	6
(Denmark) D Ekner (France) N Fuchs	4	3
(Belgium) M Gurdal (Belgium) M Van Haver	4	0
2	(Australia) E Goolagong (Australia) J Young	6	6

Quarterfinals
3	(Australia) K Harris (Australia) K Melville	6	6
(Australia) P Coleman (Australia) W Turnbull	1	1
(United Kingdom) L Charles (United Kingdom) G Coles	2	4
2	(Australia) E Goolagong (Australia) J Young	6	6

Semifinals
3	(Australia) K Harris (Australia) K Melville	6	6
2	(Australia) E Goolagong (Australia) J Young	2	4
