= 1974 Federation Cup (tennis) =

International women's tennis competition

Details
- Duration: 13 – 19 May
- Edition: 12th

Champion
- Winning nation: Australia

The 1974 Federation Cup was the 12th edition of the most important competition between national teams in women's tennis. 29 nations participated in the tournament, which was held at the Naples Tennis Club in Naples, Italy, from 13–19 May. Australia defended their title, defeating United States in the final, in what was the fifth final featuring both United States and Australia.

== Participating teams ==
Participating Teams
Argentina	Australia	Austria	Belgium	Canada	Chile	Denmark	France
Great Britain	Indonesia	Ireland	Israel	Italy	Japan	Luxembourg	
Netherlands	New Zealand	Norway	Philippines	Poland	Romania	South Africa	
Spain	Sudan	Sweden	Switzerland	United States	West Germany	Yugoslavia	

== Draw ==
All ties were played at the Naples Tennis Club in Naples, Italy, on clay courts.|}

First Round
Italy	3
Belgium	0
Indonesia	1
Israel	2
Great Britain	3
Ireland	0
Chile	1
Norway	2
Yugoslavia	w/o
Switzerland
Sudan	w/o
South Africa
Romania	2
Argentina	1
Denmark	1
Sweden	2
New Zealand	0
Spain	3
Canada	0
West Germany	3
Netherlands	1
France	2
Philippines	0
Austria	3
Luxembourg	0
Poland	3

Second Round
Australia	2
Japan	0
Italy	3
Israel	0
Great Britain	3
Norway	0
Switzerland	0
South Africa	3
Romania	2
Sweden	1
Spain	0
West Germany	2
France	2
Austria	0
Poland	0
United States	3

Quarterfinals
Australia	3
Italy	0
Great Britain	2
South Africa	1
Romania	0
West Germany	3
France	0
United States	3

Semifinals
Australia	3
Great Britain	0
West Germany	1
United States	2

Final
Australia	2
United States	1

=== First round ===
==== Italy vs. Belgium ====
Italy
3
Naples Tennis Club, Naples, Italy
May 1974
Red clay (outdoor)

Belgium
0

			1	2	3
1	(Italy) (Belgium)	Lea Pericoli; Michele Gurdal	6; 3	6; 4
2	(Italy) (Belgium)	Monique Di Maso; Monique Van Haver	7; 5	6; 4
3	(Italy) (Belgium)	Lucia Bassi / Daniela Marzano; Michele Gurdal / Monique Van Haver	17; 15	6; 1

- This match currently holds the record for the most games in a Fed Cup doubles set (pre-tiebreak).

==== Indonesia vs. Israel ====
Indonesia
1
Naples Tennis Club, Naples, Italy
May 1974
Red clay (outdoor)

Israel
2

			1	2	3
1	(Indonesia) (Israel)	Lany Kaligis; Paulina Peisachov	2; 6	6; 3	7; 9
2	(Indonesia) (Israel)	Lita Sugiarto; Janine Strauss	6; 2	4; 6	5; 7
3	(Indonesia) (Israel)	Lany Kaligis / Lita Sugiarto; Paulina Peisachov / Janine Strauss	6; 1	6; 1

==== Great Britain vs. Ireland ====
Great Britain
3
Naples Tennis Club, Naples, Italy
May 1974
Red clay (outdoor)

Ireland
0

			1	2	3
1	(United Kingdom) (Republic of Ireland)	Virginia Wade; Geraldine Barniville	6; 1	6; 0
2	(United Kingdom) (Republic of Ireland)	Glynis Coles; Helen Lennon	6; 2	6; 3
3	(United Kingdom) (Republic of Ireland)	Glynis Coles / Virginia Wade; Geraldine Barniville / Helen Lennon	6; 3	6; 1

==== Chile vs. Norway ====
Chile
1
Naples Tennis Club, Naples, Italy
May 1974
Red clay (outdoor)

Norway
2

			1	2	3
1	(Chile) (Norway)	Ana María Arias; Ellen Grindvold	3; 6	6; 2	1; 6
2	(Chile) (Norway)	Michelle Rodríguez; Kirsten Robsahm	6; 1	6; 3
3	(Chile) (Norway)	Michelle Rodríguez / Ana María Arias; Ellen Grindvold / Kirsten Robsahm	4; 6	3; 6

==== Romania vs. Argentina ====
Romania
2
Naples Tennis Club, Naples, Italy
May 1974
Red clay (outdoor)

Argentina
1

			1	2	3
1	(Romania) (Argentina)	Virginia Ruzici; Raquel Giscafré	3; 6	6; 8
2	(Romania) (Argentina)	Mariana Simionescu; Beatriz Araujo	6; 1	6; 3
3	(Romania) (Argentina)	Virginia Ruzici / Mariana Simionescu; Raquel Giscafré / Elvira Weisenberger	6; 2	3; 6	6; 2

==== Denmark vs. Sweden ====
Denmark
1
Naples Tennis Club, Naples, Italy
May 1974
Red clay (outdoor)

Sweden
2

			1	2	3
1	(Denmark) (Sweden)	Anne-Mette Sorensen; Christina Sandberg	6; 4	4; 6	6; 0
2	(Denmark) (Sweden)	Helle Sparre; Margareta Forsgårdh	2; 6	5; 7
3	(Denmark) (Sweden)	Dorte Ekner / Anne-Mette Sorensen; Christina Sandberg / Mimmi Wikstedt	4; 6	4; 6

==== New Zealand vs. Spain ====
New Zealand
0
Naples Tennis Club, Naples, Italy
May 1974
Red clay (outdoor)

Spain
3

			1	2	3
1	(New Zealand) (Spain)	Robyn Hunt; Carmen Perea	0; 6	2; 6
2	(New Zealand) (Spain)	Beverley Billington; Vicky Baldovinos	2; 6	5; 7
3	(New Zealand) (Spain)	Robyn Hunt / Beverley Billington; Ana María Estalella Manso / Carmen Mandarino	4; 6	4; 6

==== Canada vs. West Germany ====
Canada
0
Naples Tennis Club, Naples, Italy
May 1974
Red clay (outdoor)

West Germany
3

			1	2	3
1	(Canada) (West Germany)	Andrée Martin; Helga Masthoff	3; 6	2; 6
2	(Canada) (West Germany)	Jane O'Hara; Helga Hösl	0; 6	1; 6
3	(Canada) (West Germany)	Andrée Martin / Jane O'Hara; Katja Ebbinghaus / Helga Masthoff	3; 6	1; 6

==== Netherlands vs. France ====
Netherlands
1
Naples Tennis Club, Naples, Italy
May 1974
Red clay (outdoor)

France
2

			1	2	3
1	(Netherlands) (France)	Marijke Schaar; Gail Benedetti	3; 6	6; 1	6; 8
2	(Netherlands) (France)	Elly Appel; Odile de Roubin	4; 6	2; 6
3	(Netherlands) (France)	Ada Bakker / Marijke Schaar; Odile de Roubin / Florence Guédy	6; 4	2; 6	6; 4

==== Philippines vs. Austria ====
Philippines
0
Naples Tennis Club, Naples, Italy
May 1974
Red clay (outdoor)

Austria
3

			1	2	3
1	(Philippines) (Austria)	Marissa Sanchez; Maria Hollingsworth	4; 6	3; 6
2	(Philippines) (Austria)	Cleopatra López; Veronika Buche	2; 6	1; 6
3	(Philippines) (Austria)	Gladys Imperial / Marissa Sanchez; Veronika Buche / Maria Hollingsworth	6; 8	4; 6

==== Luxembourg vs. Poland ====
Luxembourg
0
Naples Tennis Club, Naples, Italy
May 1974
Red clay (outdoor)

Poland
3

			1	2	3
1	(Luxembourg) (Poland)	Josiane Graas; Barbara Kral	0; 6	1; 6
2	(Luxembourg) (Poland)	Monique Krecke; Elżbieta Slesicka	0; 6	3; 6
3	(Luxembourg) (Poland)	Josiane Graas / Monique Krecke; Barbara Kral / Elżbieta Slesicka	1; 6	1; 6

=== Second round ===
==== Australia vs. Japan ====
Australia
2
Naples Tennis Club, Naples, Italy
May 1974
Red clay (outdoor)

Japan
0

			1	2	3
1	(Australia) (Japan)	Evonne Goolagong; Kazuko Sawamatsu	6; 2	6; 2
2	(Australia) (Japan)	Dianne Fromholtz; Hideko Goto	6; 4	6; 1
3	(Australia) (Japan)					not played

==== Italy vs. Israel ====
Italy
3
Naples Tennis Club, Naples, Italy
May 1974
Red clay (outdoor)

Israel
0

			1	2	3
1	(Italy) (Israel)	Lea Pericoli; Paulina Peisachov	6; 3	6; 2
2	(Italy) (Israel)	Monique Di Maso; Janine Strauss	6; 0	6; 1
3	(Italy) (Israel)	Lucia Bassi / Daniela Marzano; Paulina Peisachov / Janine Strauss	6; 2	6; 2

==== Great Britain vs. Norway ====
Great Britain
3
Naples Tennis Club, Naples, Italy
May 1974
Red clay (outdoor)

Norway
0

			1	2	3
1	(United Kingdom) (Norway)	Virginia Wade; Ellen Grindvold	6; 4	6; 3
2	(United Kingdom) (Norway)	Glynis Coles; Bente Kjolstad	6; 3	6; 1
3	(United Kingdom) (Norway)	Glynis Coles / Virginia Wade; Ellen Grindvold / Kirsten Robsahm	6; 2	6; 1

==== Switzerland vs. South Africa ====
Switzerland
0
Naples Tennis Club, Naples, Italy
May 1974
Red clay (outdoor)

South Africa
3

			1	2	3
1	(Switzerland) (South Africa)	Marianne Kindler; Patricia Walkden	1; 6	3; 6
2	(Switzerland) (South Africa)	Susi Eichenberger; Ilana Kloss	3; 6	0; 6
3	(Switzerland) (South Africa)	Susi Eichenberger / Annina von Planta; Linky Boshoff / Ilana Kloss	1; 6	4; 6

==== Romania vs. Sweden ====
Romania
2
Naples Tennis Club, Naples, Italy
May 1974
Red clay (outdoor)

Sweden
1

			1	2	3
1	(Romania) (Sweden)	Virginia Ruzici; Christina Sandberg	6; 8	4; 6
2	(Romania) (Sweden)	Mariana Simionescu; Margareta Forsgårdh	7; 5	4; 6	6; 3
3	(Romania) (Sweden)	Virginia Ruzici / Mariana Simionescu; Christina Sandberg / Mimmi Wikstedt	7; 5	6; 4

==== Spain vs. West Germany ====
Spain
2
Naples Tennis Club, Naples, Italy
May 1974
Red clay (outdoor)

West Germany
0

			1	2	3
1	(Spain) (West Germany)	Carmen Perea; Helga Masthoff	6; 4	1; 6	2; 6
2	(Spain) (West Germany)	Vicky Baldovinos; Katja Ebbinghaus	5; 7	4; 6
3	(Spain) (West Germany)					not played

==== France vs. Austria ====
France
2
Naples Tennis Club, Naples, Italy
May 1974
Red clay (outdoor)

Austria
0

			1	2	3
1	(France) (Austria)	Gail Benedetti; Maria Hollingsworth	6; 1	6; 0
2	(France) (Austria)	Odile de Roubin; Veronika Buche	3; 6	6; 1	6; 2
3	(France) (Austria)					not played

==== Poland vs. United States ====
Poland
0
Naples Tennis Club, Naples, Italy
May 1974
Red clay (outdoor)

United States
3

			1	2	3
1	(Poland) (United States)	Barbara Kral; Julie Heldman	3; 6	2; 6
2	(Poland) (United States)	Elżbieta Slesicka; Jeanne Evert	6; 8	1; 6
3	(Poland) (United States)	Barbara Kral / Elżbieta Slesicka; Julie Heldman / Sharon Walsh	6; 4	1; 6	3; 6

=== Quarterfinals ===
==== Australia vs. Italy ====
Australia
3
Naples Tennis Club, Naples, Italy
May 1974
Red clay (outdoor)

Italy
0

			1	2	3
1	(Australia) (Italy)	Evonne Goolagong; Lea Pericoli	6; 2	6; 0
2	(Australia) (Italy)	Dianne Fromholtz; Monique Di Maso	7; 5	6; 1
3	(Australia) (Italy)	Evonne Goolagong / Janet Young; Lucia Bassi / Lea Pericoli	6; 1	6; 3

==== Great Britain vs. South Africa ====
Great Britain
2
Naples Tennis Club, Naples, Italy
May 1974
Red clay (outdoor)

South Africa
1

			1	2	3
1	(United Kingdom) (South Africa)	Virginia Wade; Patricia Walkden	6; 8	6; 1	6; 1
2	(United Kingdom) (South Africa)	Glynis Coles; Ilana Kloss	4; 6	6; 4	1; 6
3	(United Kingdom) (South Africa)	Glynis Coles / Virginia Wade; Linky Boshoff / Ilana Kloss	6; 3	8; 6

==== Romania vs. West Germany ====
Romania
0
Naples Tennis Club, Naples, Italy
May 1974
Red clay (outdoor)

West Germany
3

			1	2	3
1	(Romania) (West Germany)	Virginia Ruzici; Helga Masthoff	3; 6	2; 6
2	(Romania) (West Germany)	Mariana Simionescu; Helga Hösl	3; 6	3; 6
3	(Romania) (West Germany)	Judith Gohn / Virginia Ruzici; Katja Ebbinghaus / Helga Masthoff	3; 6	6; 1	3; 6

==== France vs. United States ====
France
0
Naples Tennis Club, Naples, Italy
May 1974
Red clay (outdoor)

United States
3

			1	2	3
1	(France) (United States)	Gail Benedetti; Julie Heldman	2; 6	2; 6
2	(France) (United States)	Odile de Roubin; Jeanne Evert	3; 6	4; 6
3	(France) (United States)	Gail Benedetti / Florence Guédy; Julie Heldman / Sharon Walsh	3; 6	1; 6

=== Semifinals ===
==== Australia vs. Great Britain ====
Australia
3
Naples Tennis Club, Naples, Italy
May 1974
Red clay (outdoor)

Great Britain
0

			1	2	3
1	(Australia) (United Kingdom)	Evonne Goolagong; Virginia Wade	6; 4	6; 2
2	(Australia) (United Kingdom)	Dianne Fromholtz; Glynis Coles	6; 3	2; 6	6; 2
3	(Australia) (United Kingdom)	Evonne Goolagong / Janet Young; Sue Barker / Virginia Wade	6; 0	6; 2

==== West Germany vs. United States ====
West Germany
1
Naples Tennis Club, Naples, Italy
May 1974
Red clay (outdoor)

United States
2

			1	2	3
1	(West Germany) (United States)	Helga Masthoff; Julie Heldman	6; 2	6; 3
2	(West Germany) (United States)	Helga Hösl; Jeanne Evert	4; 6	3; 6
3	(West Germany) (United States)	Katja Ebbinghaus / Helga Masthoff; Julie Heldman / Sharon Walsh	6; 3	4; 6	1; 6

=== Final ===
==== Australia vs. United States ====
Australia
2
Naples Tennis Club, Naples, Italy
19 May 1974
Red clay (outdoor)

United States
1

			1	2	3
1	(Australia) (United States)	Evonne Goolagong; Julie Heldman	6; 1	7; 5
2	(Australia) (United States)	Dianne Fromholtz; Jeanne Evert	6; 2	5; 7	4; 6
3	(Australia) (United States)	Evonne Goolagong / Janet Young; Julie Heldman / Sharon Walsh	7; 5	8; 6

== Consolation Round ==
Teams which lost in the first or second round of the main draw went on to play in the Consolation Round.

=== Draw ===
Consolation first round
Luxembourg	0
Austria	2
Philippines	0
Sweden	3
Switzerland	0
Poland	3

Consolation second round
Israel	1
Norway	2
New Zealand	0
Argentina	3
Spain	1
Indonesia	2
Belgium	3
Austria	0
Sweden	1
Poland	2
Chile	1
Japan	2
Denmark	0
Canada	3
Ireland	1
Netherlands	2

Consolation Quarterfinals
Norway	0
Argentina	3
Indonesia	1
Belgium	2
Poland	1
Japan	2
Canada	0
Netherlands	3

Consolation Semifinals
Argentina	2
Belgium	0
Japan	3
Netherlands	0

Consolation final
Argentina	1
Japan	2

=== First round ===
==== Luxembourg vs. Austria ====
Luxembourg
0
Naples Tennis Club, Naples, Italy
May 1974
Red clay (outdoor)

Austria
2

			1	2	3
1	(Luxembourg) (Austria)	Josiane Graas; Maria Hollingsworth	2; 6	1; 6
2	(Luxembourg) (Austria)	Monique Krecke; Veronika Buche	2; 6	0; 6
3	(Luxembourg) (Austria)

==== Philippines vs. Sweden ====
Philippines
0
Naples Tennis Club, Naples, Italy
May 1974
Red clay (outdoor)

Sweden
3

			1	2	3
1	(Philippines) (Sweden)	Marissa Sanchez; Christina Sandberg	3; 6	0; 6
2	(Philippines) (Sweden)	Cleopatra López; Margareta Forsgårdh	1; 6	1; 6
3	(Philippines) (Sweden)	Gladys Imperial / Marissa Sanchez; Christina Sandberg / Mimmi Wikstedt	1; 6	2; 6

==== Switzerland vs. Poland ====
Switzerland
0
Naples Tennis Club, Naples, Italy
May 1974
Red clay (outdoor)

Poland
3

			1	2	3
1	(Switzerland) (Poland)	Marianne Kindler; Barbara Kral	2; 6	1; 6
2	(Switzerland) (Poland)	Susi Eichenberger; Elżbieta Slesicka	6; 8	2; 6
3	(Switzerland) (Poland)	Susi Eichenberger / Annina von Planta; Małgorzata Rejdych / Elżbieta Slesicka	3; 6	2; 6

=== Second round ===
==== Israel vs. Norway ====
Israel
1
Naples Tennis Club, Naples, Italy
May 1974
Red clay (outdoor)

Norway
2

			1	2	3
1	(Israel) (Norway)	Paulina Peisachov; Ellen Grindvold	6; 4	6; 0
2	(Israel) (Norway)	Janine Strauss; Bente Kjolstad	2; 6	1; 6
3	(Israel) (Norway)	Paulina Peisachov / Janine Strauss; Ellen Grindvold / Bente Kjolstad	2; 6	0; 6

==== New Zealand vs. Argentina ====
New Zealand
0
Naples Tennis Club, Naples, Italy
May 1974
Red clay (outdoor)

Argentina
3

			1	2	3
1	(New Zealand) (Argentina)	Robyn Hunt; Raquel Giscafré	1; 6	0; 6
2	(New Zealand) (Argentina)	Judy Chaloner; Elvira Weisenberger	1; 6	3; 6
3	(New Zealand) (Argentina)	Judy Chaloner / Beverley Billington; Beatriz Araujo / Raquel Giscafré	2; 6	3; 6

==== Spain vs. Indonesia ====
Spain
1
Naples Tennis Club, Naples, Italy
May 1974
Red clay (outdoor)

Indonesia
2

			1	2	3
1	(Spain) (Indonesia)	Carmen Perea; Lany Kaligis	8; 6	4; 6	1; 0	retired
2	(Spain) (Indonesia)	Vicky Baldovinos; Lita Sugiarto	6; 8	4; 6
3	(Spain) (Indonesia)	Ana María Estalella Manso / Carmen Mandarino; Lany Kaligis / Lita Sugiarto	4; 6	1; 6

==== Belgium vs. Austria ====
Belgium
3
Naples Tennis Club, Naples, Italy
May 1974
Red clay (outdoor)

Austria
0

			1	2	3
1	(Belgium) (Austria)	Michele Gurdal; Maria Hollingsworth	6; 2	6; 1
2	(Belgium) (Austria)	Monique Van Haver; Veronika Buche	6; 1	6; 1
3	(Belgium) (Austria)	Michele Gurdal / Monique Van Haver; Veronika Buche / Maria Hollingsworth	6; 0	6; 1

==== Sweden vs. Poland ====
Sweden
1
Naples Tennis Club, Naples, Italy
May 1974
Red clay (outdoor)

Poland
2

			1	2	3
1	(Sweden) (Poland)	Christina Sandberg; Barbara Kral	1; 6	1; 6
2	(Sweden) (Poland)	Margareta Forsgårdh; Elżbieta Slesicka	7; 5	3; 6	3; 6
3	(Sweden) (Poland)	Helena Anliot / Mimmi Wikstedt; Małgorzata Rejdych / Elżbieta Slesicka	6; 4	6; 4

==== Chile vs. Japan ====
Chile
1
Naples Tennis Club, Naples, Italy
May 1974
Red clay (outdoor)

Japan
2

			1	2	3
1	(Chile) (Japan)	Ana María Arias; Kazuko Sawamatsu	4; 6	1; 6
2	(Chile) (Japan)	Michelle Rodríguez; Hideko Goto	8; 6	7; 5
3	(Chile) (Japan)	Michelle Rodríguez / Ana María Arias; Kayoko Fukuoka / Kazuko Sawamatsu	0; 6	2; 6

==== Denmark vs. Canada ====
Denmark
0
Naples Tennis Club, Naples, Italy
May 1974
Red clay (outdoor)

Canada
3

			1	2	3
1	(Denmark) (Canada)	Anne-Mette Sorensen; Andrée Martin	4; 6	4; 6
2	(Denmark) (Canada)	Helle Sparre; Jane O'Hara	4; 6	1; 6
3	(Denmark) (Canada)	Dorte Ekner / Mari-Ann Klougart; Andrée Martin / Jane O'Hara	2; 6	3; 6

==== Ireland vs. Netherlands ====
Ireland
1
Naples Tennis Club, Naples, Italy
May 1974
Red clay (outdoor)

Netherlands
2

			1	2	3
1	(Republic of Ireland) (Netherlands)	Geraldine Barniville; Marijke Schaar	6; 4	9; 7
2	(Republic of Ireland) (Netherlands)	Helen Lennon; Elly Appel	1; 6	3; 6
3	(Republic of Ireland) (Netherlands)	Geraldine Barniville / Helen Lennon; Ada Bakker / Marijke Schaar	1; 6	0; 6

=== Quarterfinals ===
==== Norway vs. Argentina ====
Norway
0
Naples Tennis Club, Naples, Italy
May 1974
Red clay (outdoor)

Argentina
3

			1	2	3
1	(Norway) (Argentina)	Ellen Grindvold; Raquel Giscafré	1; 6	3; 6
2	(Norway) (Argentina)	Bente Kjolstad; Beatriz Araujo	1; 6	0; 6
3	(Norway) (Argentina)	Ellen Grindvold / Kirsten Robsahm; Beatriz Araujo / Raquel Giscafré	4; 6	4; 6

==== Indonesia vs. Belgium ====
Indonesia
1
Naples Tennis Club, Naples, Italy
May 1974
Red clay (outdoor)

Belgium
2

			1	2	3
1	(Indonesia) (Belgium)	Lany Kaligis; Michele Gurdal	1; 6	0; 6
2	(Indonesia) (Belgium)	Lita Sugiarto; Monique Van Haver	6; 3	6; 3
3	(Indonesia) (Belgium)	Lany Kaligis / Lita Sugiarto; Michele Gurdal / Monique Van Haver	3; 6	3; 6

==== Poland vs. Japan ====
Poland
1
Naples Tennis Club, Naples, Italy
May 1974
Red clay (outdoor)

Japan
2

			1	2	3
1	(Poland) (Japan)	Barbara Kral; Kazuko Sawamatsu	0; 6	3; 6
2	(Poland) (Japan)	Elżbieta Slesicka; Hideko Goto	6; 2	6; 4
3	(Poland) (Japan)	Barbara Kral / Elżbieta Slesicka; Kayoko Fukuoka / Kazuko Sawamatsu	0; 6	1; 6

==== Canada vs. Netherlands ====
Canada
0
Naples Tennis Club, Naples, Italy
May 1974
Red clay (outdoor)

Netherlands
3

			1	2	3
1	(Canada) (Netherlands)	Andrée Martin; Marijke Schaar	3; 6	3; 6
2	(Canada) (Netherlands)	Jane O'Hara; Elly Appel	6; 1	0; 6	3; 6
3	(Canada) (Netherlands)	Andrée Martin / Jane O'Hara; Ada Bakker / Nora Lauteslager	1; 6	2; 6

=== Semifinals ===
==== Argentina vs. Belgium ====
Argentina
2
Naples Tennis Club, Naples, Italy
May 1974
Red clay (outdoor)

Belgium
0

			1	2	3
1	(Argentina) (Belgium)	Raquel Giscafré; Michele Gurdal	6; 3	6; 2
2	(Argentina) (Belgium)	Elvira Weisenberger; Monique Van Haver	7; 3	6; 2
3	(Argentina) (Belgium)

==== Japan vs. Netherlands ====
Japan
3
Naples Tennis Club, Naples, Italy
May 1974
Red clay (outdoor)

Netherlands
0

			1	2	3
1	(Japan) (Netherlands)	Kazuko Sawamatsu; Marijke Schaar	6; 4	3; 6	6; 1
2	(Japan) (Netherlands)	Hideko Goto; Elly Appel	6; 3	6; 3
3	(Japan) (Netherlands)	Kayoko Fukuoka / Kazuko Sawamatsu; Ada Bakker / Marijke Schaar	6; 4	6; 1

=== Final ===
==== Argentina vs. Japan ====
Argentina
1
Naples Tennis Club, Naples, Italy
May 1974
Red clay (outdoor)

Japan
2

			1	2	3
1	(Argentina) (Japan)	Raquel Giscafré; Kazuko Sawamatsu	6; 1	6; 3
2	(Argentina) (Japan)	Elvira Weisenberger; Hideko Goto	6; 8	8; 6	3; 6
3	(Argentina) (Japan)	Raquel Giscafré / Elvira Weisenberger; Kayoko Fukuoka / Kazuko Sawamatsu	3; 6	2; 6
