= 1970 Australian Open – Women's singles =

Women's singles
- 1970 Australian Open

Final
- Champion: (Australia) Margaret Court
- Runner-up: (Australia) Kerry Melville
- Score: 6–3, 6–1

Details
- Draw: 43
- Seeds: 8

Events
| Singles | men | women | | boys | girls |
| Doubles | men | women | mixed | boys | girls |
- Australian Open

Defending champion Margaret Court defeated Kerry Melville in the final, 6–3, 6–1 to win the women's singles tennis title at the 1970 Australian Open. It was her ninth Australian Open singles title and 17th major singles title overall. It was also the first step in an eventual Calendar Grand Slam for Court, the first in women's singles in the Open Era. Court did not lose a set during the tournament.

== Seeds ==
All seeds receive a bye into the second round.

1. (Australia) Margaret Court (champion)
2. (Australia) Kerry Melville (final)
3. (United Kingdom) Winnie Shaw (semifinals)
4. (Australia) Karen Krantzcke (semifinals)
5. (Australia) Judy Dalton (quarterfinals)
6. (Sweden) Christina Sandberg (quarterfinals)
7. (Australia) Lesley Hunt (quarterfinals)
8. (Australia) Kerry Harris (third round)

== Draw ==
Key

- Q = Qualifier
- WC = Wild card
- LL = Lucky loser
- Alt = Alternate
- ITF = ITF entry
- PR = Protected ranking
- SR = Special ranking
- SE = Special exempt
- JE = Junior exempt
- JR = Junior Accelerator Programme entrant
- CO = College Accelerator Programme entrant
- NG = Next Gen Accelerator Program entrant
- w/o = Walkover
- r = Retired
- d = Defaulted

=== Finals ===
Quarterfinals
1 | (Australia) Margaret Court | 6 | 6
(Australia) Evonne Goolagong | 3 | 1
4 | (Australia) Karen Krantzcke | 8 | 11
5 | (Australia) Judy Dalton | 6 | 9
7 | (Australia) Lesley Hunt | 4 | 3
3 | (United Kingdom) Winnie Shaw | 6 | 6
6 | (Sweden) Christina Sandberg | 0 | 2
2 | (Australia) Kerry Melville | 6 | 6

Semifinals
1 | (Australia) Margaret Court | 6 | 6
4 | (Australia) Karen Krantzcke | 1 | 3
3 | (United Kingdom) Winnie Shaw | 6 | 4
2 | (Australia) Kerry Melville | 8 | 6

Final
1 | (Australia) Margaret Court | 6 | 6
2 | (Australia) Kerry Melville | 3 | 1

=== Top half ===
==== Section 1 ====
First round
(Australia) C Langsford | 6 | 6
(Australia) S Irvine | 3 | 2
(Australia) C Cooper | 0 | 3
(Australia) H Amos | 6 | 6
(Australia) N Marsh | 6 | 7
(Australia) S Thomson | 2 | 5

Second round
1 | (Australia) M Court | 6 | 6
(Australia) C Langsford | 0 | 0
(Australia) H Kayser | 4 | 6 | 5
(Australia) K Wilkinson | 6 | 3 | 7
8 | (Australia) K Harris | 6 | 8
(Australia) H Amos | 3 | 6
(Australia) E Goolagong | 6 | 6
(Australia) N Marsh | 4 | 4

Third round
1 | (Australia) M Court | 6 | 6
(Australia) K Wilkinson | 0 | 1
8 | (Australia) K Harris | 8 | 0
(Australia) E Goolagong | 10 | 6

Quarterfinals
1 | (Australia) M Court | 6 | 6
(Australia) E Goolagong | 3 | 1

==== Section 2 ====
First round
(Australia) T Van Haren | 1 | 1
(Australia) V Lancaster | 6 | 6
(Australia) S Walsham | 7 | 6
(Australia) J Harris | 5 | 4

Second round
4 | (Australia) K Krantzcke | 6 | 6
(Australia) V Lancaster | 3 | 2
(Indonesia) L Liem | 6 | 6
(Australia) J Gohl | 3 | 3
5 | (Australia) J Dalton | 6 | 6
(Australia) S Walsham | 3 | 2
(Indonesia) L Kaligis | 6 | 6
(Australia) J Whyte | 4 | 3

Third round
4 | (Australia) K Krantzcke | 6 | 6
(Indonesia) L Liem | 1 | 4
5 | (Australia) J Dalton | 6 | 6
(Indonesia) L Kaligis | 1 | 3

Quarterfinals
4 | (Australia) K Krantzcke | 8 | 11
5 | (Australia) J Dalton | 6 | 9

=== Bottom half ===
==== Section 3 ====
First round
(Australia) S Hole | 6 | 6
(Australia) L Cameron | 3 | 0
(Australia) C Norquay | 6 | 3 | 6
(Australia) M Morgan | 3 | 6 | 3
(Australia) N Eastburn | 6 | 4 | 3
(Australia) C Sieler | 4 | 6 | 6

Second round
(Australia) S Hole | 2 | 3
(Australia) J Young | 6 | 6
(Australia) C Norquay | 0 | 2
7 | (Australia) L Hunt | 6 | 6
(Australia) W Turnbull | 4 | 2
(Australia) W Gilchrist | 6 | 6
(Australia) C Sieler | 1 | 3
3 | (United Kingdom) W Shaw | 6 | 6

Third round
(Australia) J Young | 6 | 3
7 | (Australia) L Hunt | 8 | 6
(Australia) W Gilchrist | 1 | 3
3 | (United Kingdom) W Shaw | 6 | 6

Quarterfinals
7 | (Australia) L Hunt | 6 | 6
3 | (United Kingdom) W Shaw | 4 | 3

==== Section 4 ====
First round
(Australia) V Caulley
(Australia) E Allan | w/o
(Australia) K Hogarth | 5 | 9
(Australia) H Sheedy | 7 | 11
(Australia) J Fallis | 6 | 3 | 3
(Australia) A Avis | 1 | 6 | 6

Second round
(Australia) V Caulley | 1 | 0
(Australia) J O'Neill | 6 | 6
(Australia) H Sheedy | 0 | 3
6 | (Sweden) C Sandberg | 6 | 6
(Australia) S Alexander | 6 | 8
(Australia) M Tesch | 4 | 6
(Australia) A Avis | 3 | 2
2 | (Australia) K Melville | 6 | 6

Third round
(Australia) J O'Neill | 6 | 5
6 | (Sweden) C Sandberg | 8 | 7
(Australia) S Alexander | 0 | 2
2 | (Australia) K Melville | 6 | 6

Quarterfinals
6 | (Sweden) C Sandberg | 0 | 2
2 | (Australia) K Melville | 6 | 6

| Preceded by 1969 US Open – Women's singles | Grand Slam women's singles | Succeeded by 1970 French Open – Women's singles |
