= 1970 Australian Open – Women's doubles =

Women's doubles
- 1970 Australian Open

Final
- Champions: (Australia) Margaret Court (Australia) Judy Dalton
- Runners-up: (Australia) Karen Krantzcke (Australia) Kerry Melville
- Score: 6–1, 6–3

Details
- Draw: 18
- Seeds: 4

Events
Singles	men	women		boys	girls
Doubles	men	women	mixed	boys	girls
- Australian Open

Margaret Court and Judy Dalton defeated Karen Krantzcke and Kerry Melville 6–1, 6–3 in the final to win the women's doubles title at the 1970 Australian Open.

== Seeds ==
All seeds receive a bye into the second round.

1. (Australia) Margaret Court / (Australia) Judy Dalton (champion)
2. (Australia) Karen Krantzcke / (Australia) Kerry Melville (final)
3. (Australia) Kerry Harris / (United Kingdom) Winnie Shaw (semifinals)
4. (Australia) Jan O'Neill / (Sweden) Christina Sandberg (quarterfinals)

== Draw ==
Key

- Q = Qualifier
- WC = Wild card
- LL = Lucky loser
- Alt = Alternate
- ITF = ITF entry
- PR = Protected ranking
- SR = Special ranking
- SE = Special exempt
- JE = Junior exempt
- JR = Junior Accelerator Programme entrant
- CO = College Accelerator Programme entrant
- NG = Next Gen Accelerator Program entrant
- w/o = Walkover
- r = Retired
- d = Defaulted

=== Finals ===
Semifinals
1	(Australia) Margaret Court (Australia) Judy Dalton	6	6
(Australia) Wendy Gilchrist (Australia) Lesley Hunt	4	2
3	(Australia) Kerry Harris (United Kingdom) Winnie Shaw	10	6	6
2	(Australia) Karen Krantzcke (Australia) Kerry Melville	12	4	8

Final
1	(Australia) Margaret Court (Australia) Judy Dalton	6	6
2	(Australia) Karen Krantzcke (Australia) Kerry Melville	1	3

=== Top half ===
First round
(Australia) L Mansfield (Australia) H Sheedy	3	3
(Australia) J Harris (Australia) K Wilkinson	6	6
(Australia) N Marsh (Australia) C Zeeman	w/o
(Australia) R Davis (Australia) J Whyte

Second round
1	(Australia) M Court (Australia) J Dalton	6	6
(Australia) C Cooper (Australia) N Eastburn	1	2
(Australia) J Harris (Australia) K Wilkinson	3	2
(Australia) K Hogarth (Australia) M Tesch	6	6
(Australia) W Gilchrist (Australia) L Hunt	9	7
(Australia) N Marsh (Australia) C Zeeman	7	5
(Australia) A Coleman (Australia) C Matison	0	0
4	(Australia) J O'Neill (Sweden) C Sandberg	6	6

Quarterfinals
1	(Australia) M Court (Australia) J Dalton	6	6
(Australia) K Hogarth (Australia) M Tesch	3	1
(Australia) W Gilchrist (Australia) L Hunt	8	2	7
4	(Australia) J O'Neill (Sweden) C Sandberg	6	6	5

Semifinals
1	(Australia) M Court (Australia) J Dalton	6	6
(Australia) W Gilchrist (Australia) L Hunt	4	2

=== Bottom half ===
First round

Second round
3	(Australia) K Harris (United Kingdom) W Shaw	6	6
(Australia) C King (Australia) M Starr	2	1
(Australia) H Amos (Australia) S Hole	6	6	1
(Indonesia) L Kaligis (Indonesia) L Liem	4	8	6
(Australia) S Alexander (Australia) S Walsham	6	6
(Australia) V Lancaster (Australia) B Murphy	3	3
(Australia) E Allan (Australia) C Langsford	4	4
2	(Australia) K Krantzcke (Australia) K Melville	6	6

Quarterfinals
3	(Australia) K Harris (United Kingdom) W Shaw	6	6
(Indonesia) L Kaligis (Indonesia) L Liem	0	3
(Australia) S Alexander (Australia) S Walsham	1	1
2	(Australia) K Krantzcke (Australia) K Melville	6	6

Semifinals
3	(Australia) K Harris (United Kingdom) W Shaw	10	6	6
2	(Australia) K Krantzcke (Australia) K Melville	12	4	8
