= 1980 Federation Cup (tennis) =

International women's tennis competition

Details
- Duration: 19–25 May
- Edition: 18th

Champion
- Winning nation: United States

The 1980 Federation Cup was the 18th edition of the most important competition between national teams in women's tennis. The tournament was held at the Rot-Weiss Tennis Club in West Berlin from 19 to 25 May. The United States won their fifth consecutive title, defeating Australia in their tenth and record eighth consecutive final. The US did not drop a single match during the tournament.

== Participating teams ==
Participating teams
Argentina	Australia	Austria	Belgium	Canada	Chinese Taipei	Czechoslovakia	Denmark
France	Great Britain	Hungary	Indonesia	Ireland	Israel	Italy	Japan
Luxembourg	Mexico	Netherlands	New Zealand	Netherlands	Poland	Romania	South Korea
Soviet Union	Spain	Sweden	Switzerland	Thailand	United States	West Germany	Yugoslavia

== Draw ==
All ties were played at the Rot-Weiss Tennis Club in West Berlin, on clay courts. |}

First Round
United States	3
Poland	0
New Zealand	2
Mexico	0
Belgium	0
Italy	3
South Korea	0
Soviet Union	3
Switzerland	3
Denmark	0
Ireland	0
Romania	3
Canada	1
Yugoslavia	2
Hungary	0
Czechoslovakia	3
Great Britain	3
Israel	0
Argentina	2
Netherlands	1
Luxembourg	0
Spain	3
Austria	0
West Germany	3
France	1
Sweden	2
Japan	3
Thailand	0
Chinese Taipei	0
Indonesia	3
Norway	0
Australia	3

Second Round
United States	3
New Zealand	0
Italy	1
Soviet Union	2
Switzerland	1
Romania	2
Yugoslavia	0
Czechoslovakia	3
Great Britain	2
Argentina	1
Spain	1
West Germany	2
Sweden	2
Japan	1
Indonesia	0
Australia	3

Quarterfinals
United States	3
Soviet Union	0
Romania	1
Czechoslovakia	2
Great Britain	0
West Germany	3
Sweden	1
Australia	2

Semifinals
United States	3
Czechoslovakia	0
West Germany	1
Australia	2

Final
United States	3
Australia	0

1st Round losing teams play in Consolation rounds

=== First round ===
==== United States vs. Poland ====
United States
3
Rot-Weiss Tennis Club, West Berlin
May 1980
Red clay (outdoor)

Poland
0

			1	2	3
1	(United States) (Poland)	Kathy Jordan; Iwona Kuczyńska	6; 0	6; 1
2	(United States) (Poland)	Tracy Austin; Małgorzata Sieradzka	6; 1	6; 1
3	(United States) (Poland)	Rosemary Casals / Kathy Jordan; Dorota Dziekońska / Iwona Kuczyńska	6; 3	4; 6	6; 3

==== New Zealand vs. Mexico ====
New Zealand
2
Rot-Weiss Tennis Club, West Berlin
May 1980
Red clay (outdoor)

Mexico
0

			1	2	3
1	(New Zealand) (Mexico)	Brenda Perry; Alejandra Vallejo	7; 6	6; 2
2	(New Zealand) (Mexico)	Judy Chaloner; Maluca Llamas	7; 6	6; 0
3	(New Zealand) (Mexico)					not played

==== Belgium vs. Italy ====
Belgium
0
Rot-Weiss Tennis Club, West Berlin
May 1980
Red clay (outdoor)

Italy
3

			1	2	3
1	(Belgium) (Italy)	Monique Van Haver; Daniela Marzano	1; 6	2; 6
2	(Belgium) (Italy)	Michele Gurdal; Sabina Simmonds	6; 4	5; 7	7; 9
3	(Belgium) (Italy)	Michele Gurdal / Nicole Mabille; Daniela Marzano / Sabina Simmonds	5; 7	5; 7

==== South Korea vs. Soviet Union ====
South Korea
1
Rot-Weiss Tennis Club, West Berlin
May 1980
Red clay (outdoor)

Soviet Union
2

			1	2	3
1	(South Korea) (Soviet Union)	Kim Soo-ok; Olga Zaitseva	6; 4	6; 4
2	(South Korea) (Soviet Union)	Lee Duk-hee; Olga Morozova	3; 6	1; 6
3	(South Korea) (Soviet Union)	Kim Soo-ok / Lee Duk-hee; Olga Morozova / Olga Zaitseva	6; 1	4; 6	1; 6

==== Switzerland vs. Denmark ====
Switzerland
3
Rot-Weiss Tennis Club, West Berlin
May 1980
Red clay (outdoor)

Denmark
0

			1	2	3
1	(Switzerland) (Denmark)	Christiane Jolissaint; Anne-Mette Sorensen	7; 5	6; 4
2	(Switzerland) (Denmark)	Petra Delhees; Dorte Ekner	6; 3	6; 3
3	(Switzerland) (Denmark)	Petra Delhees / Christiane Jolissaint; Dorte Ekner / Birgitte Hermansen	6; 3	5; 7	6; 4

==== Ireland vs. Romania ====
Ireland
0
Rot-Weiss Tennis Club, West Berlin
May 1980
Red clay (outdoor)

Romania
3

			1	2	3
1	(Republic of Ireland) (Romania)	Caitríona Ruane; Lucia Romanov	1; 6	1; 6
2	(Republic of Ireland) (Romania)	Bernadette Davy; Virginia Ruzici	1; 6	0; 6
3	(Republic of Ireland) (Romania)	Bernadette Davy / Helen Lennon; Florența Mihai / Lucia Romanov	2; 6	1; 6

==== Canada vs. Yugoslavia ====
Canada
1
Rot-Weiss Tennis Club, West Berlin
May 1980
Red clay (outdoor)

Yugoslavia
2

			1	2	3
1	(Canada) (Socialist Federal Republic of Yugoslavia)	Nina Bland; Renata Šašak	7; 5	1; 6	3; 6
2	(Canada) (Socialist Federal Republic of Yugoslavia)	Marjorie Blackwood; Mima Jaušovec	2; 6	2; 6
3	(Canada) (Socialist Federal Republic of Yugoslavia)	Marjorie Blackwood / Karen Dewis; Mima Jaušovec / Renata Šašak	3; 6	6; 4	6; 4

==== Hungary vs. Czechoslovakia ====
Hungary
0
Rot-Weiss Tennis Club, West Berlin
May 1980
Red clay (outdoor)

Czechoslovakia
3

			1	2	3
1	(Hungary) (Czechoslovakia)	Éva Rózsavölgyi; Renáta Tomanová	4; 6	6; 7
2	(Hungary) (Czechoslovakia)	Judit Szörényi; Hana Mandlíková	3; 6	1; 6
3	(Hungary) (Czechoslovakia)	Éva Rózsavölgyi / Judit Szörényi; Yvona Brzáková / Iva Budařová	5; 7	3; 6

==== Great Britain vs. Israel ====
Great Britain
3
Rot-Weiss Tennis Club, West Berlin
May 1980
Red clay (outdoor)

Israel
0

			1	2	3
1	(United Kingdom) (Israel)	Glynis Coles; Hagit Zubary	6; 1	6; 1
2	(United Kingdom) (Israel)	Sue Barker; Paulina Peled	4; 6	7; 6	6; 1
3	(United Kingdom) (Israel)	Sue Barker / Glynis Coles; Orly Bialistozky / Paulina Peled	6; 2	6; 3

==== Argentina vs. Netherlands ====
Argentina
2
Rot-Weiss Tennis Club, West Berlin
May 1980
Red clay (outdoor)

Netherlands
1

			1	2	3
1	(Argentina) (Netherlands)	Claudia Casabianca; Elly Appel	6; 3	6; 2
2	(Argentina) (Netherlands)	Ivanna Madruga Ossès; Marcella Mesker	7; 5	6; 1
3	(Argentina) (Netherlands)	Liliana Giussani / Adriana Villagrán Reami; Marcella Mesker / Elly Appel	1; 6	5; 7

==== Luxembourg vs. Spain ====
Luxembourg
0
Rot-Weiss Tennis Club, West Berlin
May 1980
Red clay (outdoor)

Spain
3

			1	2	3
1	(Luxembourg) (Spain)	Monique Krecke; Mónica Álvarez de Mon	2; 6	2; 6
2	(Luxembourg) (Spain)	Rita Krombach; Carmen Perea	0; 6	4; 6
3	(Luxembourg) (Spain)	Rita Krombach / Nadine Schmit; Isabel Moure / Betona Pellón Fernández	4; 6	3; 6

==== Austria vs. West Germany ====
Austria
0
Rot-Weiss Tennis Club, West Berlin
May 1980
Red clay (outdoor)

West Germany
3

			1	2	3
1	(Austria) (West Germany)	Andrea Pesak; Bettina Bunge	6; 3	2; 6	1; 6
2	(Austria) (West Germany)	Maria Geyer; Sylvia Hanika	1; 6	2; 6
3	(Austria) (West Germany)	Maria Geyer / Andrea Pesak; Bettina Bunge / Sylvia Hanika	4; 6	6; 4	3; 6

==== France vs. Sweden ====
France
1
Rot-Weiss Tennis Club, West Berlin
May 1980
Red clay (outdoor)

Sweden
2

			1	2	3
1	(France) (Sweden)	Frédérique Thibault; Lena Sandin	7; 6	3; 6	4; 6
2	(France) (Sweden)	Brigitte Simon; Nina Bohm	6; 4	6; 3
3	(France) (Sweden)	Gail Benedetti / Frédérique Thibault; Helena Anliot / Nina Bohm	6; 1	3; 6	0; 6

==== Japan vs. Thailand ====
Japan
3
Rot-Weiss Tennis Club, West Berlin
May 1980
Red clay (outdoor)

Thailand
0

			1	2	3
1	(Japan) (Thailand)	Kiyoko Nomura; Chongrak Sri-Ud	6; 0	6; 0
2	(Japan) (Thailand)	Naoko Sato; Suthasini Sirikaya	6; 1	6; 3
3	(Japan) (Thailand)	Kiyoko Nomura / Naoko Sato; Chalada Wattana / Suthasini Sirikaya	6; 3	5; 7	6; 3

==== Chinese Taipei vs. Indonesia ====
Chinese Taipei
0
Rot-Weiss Tennis Club, West Berlin
May 1980
Red clay (outdoor)

Indonesia
3

			1	2	3
1	(Chinese Taipei) (Indonesia)	Ho Chiu-mei; Yolanda Soemarno	4; 6	4; 6
2	(Chinese Taipei) (Indonesia)	Wen Hsiu-tsuan; Lita Sugiarto	5; 7	1; 6
3	(Chinese Taipei) (Indonesia)	Hsieh Li-chuan / Wen Hsiu-tsuan; Loanita Rachman / Lita Sugiarto	3; 6	1; 6

==== Norway vs. Australia ====
Norway
0
Rot-Weiss Tennis Club, West Berlin
May 1980
Red clay (outdoor)

Australia
3

			1	2	3
1	(Norway) (Australia)	Astrid Sunde; Dianne Fromholtz	0; 6	1; 6
2	(Norway) (Australia)	Ellen Grindvold; Wendy Turnbull	3; 6	2; 6
3	(Norway) (Australia)	Ellen Grindvold / Astrid Sunde; Dianne Fromholtz / Wendy Turnbull	1; 6	2; 6

=== Second round ===
==== United States vs. New Zealand ====
United States
3
Rot-Weiss Tennis Club, West Berlin
May 1980
Red clay (outdoors)

New Zealand
0

			1	2	3
1	(United States) (New Zealand)	Chris Evert Lloyd; Brenda Perry	6; 1	1; 0		retired
2	(United States) (New Zealand)	Tracy Austin; Judy Chaloner	6; 1	6; 1
3	(United States) (New Zealand)	Rosemary Casals / Kathy Jordan; Judy Chaloner / Chris Newton	6; 2	7; 5

==== Italy vs. Soviet Union ====
Italy
1
Rot-Weiss Tennis Club, West Berlin
May 1980
Red clay (outdoor)

Soviet Union
2

			1	2	3
1	(Italy) (Soviet Union)	Daniela Marzano; Olga Zaitseva	6; 3	6; 3
2	(Italy) (Soviet Union)	Sabina Simmonds; Olga Morozova	4; 6	2; 6
3	(Italy) (Soviet Union)	Daniela Marzano / Sabina Simmonds; Julia Kashevarova / Olga Zaitseva	5; 7	6; 3	7; 9

==== Switzerland vs. Romania ====
Switzerland
1
Rot-Weiss Tennis Club, West Berlin
May 1980
Red clay (outdoor)

Romania
2

			1	2	3
1	(Switzerland) (Romania)	Christiane Jolissaint; Lucia Romanov	1; 6	4; 6
2	(Switzerland) (Romania)	Petra Delhees; Virginia Ruzici	0; 6	3; 6
3	(Switzerland) (Romania)	Petra Delhees / Christiane Jolissaint; Florența Mihai / Virginia Ruzici	7; 6	6; 1

==== Yugoslavia vs. Czechoslovakia ====
Yugoslavia
0
Rot-Weiss Tennis Club, West Berlin
May 1980
Red clay (outdoor)

Czechoslovakia
3

			1	2	3
1	(Socialist Federal Republic of Yugoslavia) (Czechoslovakia)	Renata Šašak; Renáta Tomanová	3; 6	2; 6
2	(Socialist Federal Republic of Yugoslavia) (Czechoslovakia)	Mima Jaušovec; Hana Mandlíková	3; 6	4; 6
3	(Socialist Federal Republic of Yugoslavia) (Czechoslovakia)	Mima Jaušovec / Renata Šašak; Yvona Brzáková / Iva Budařová	6; 7	6; 1	1; 6

==== Great Britain vs. Argentina ====
Great Britain
2
Rot-Weiss Tennis Club, West Berlin
May 1980
Red clay (outdoor)

Argentina
1

			1	2	3
1	(United Kingdom) (Argentina)	Sue Barker; Adriana Villagrán Reami	5; 7	7; 6	6; 2
2	(United Kingdom) (Argentina)	Virginia Wade; Ivanna Madruga Ossès	5; 7	5; 7
3	(United Kingdom) (Argentina)	Sue Barker / Virginia Wade; Ivanna Madruga Ossès / Adriana Villagrán Reami	6; 7	6; 2	6; 4

==== Spain vs. West Germany ====
Spain
1
Rot-Weiss Tennis Club, West Berlin
May 1980
Red clay (outdoor)

West Germany
2

			1	2	3
1	(Spain) (West Germany)	Mónica Álvarez de Mon; Bettina Bunge	4; 6	2; 6
2	(Spain) (West Germany)	Carmen Perea; Sylvia Hanika	6; 4	6; 3
3	(Spain) (West Germany)	Betona Pellón Fernández / Carmen Perea; Bettina Bunge / Sylvia Hanika	3; 6	2; 6

==== Sweden vs. Japan ====
Sweden
2
Rot-Weiss Tennis Club, West Berlin
May 1980
Red clay (outdoor)

Japan
1

			1	2	3
1	(Sweden) (Japan)	Lena Sandin; Kiyoko Nomura	6; 3	6; 7	6; 8
2	(Sweden) (Japan)	Nina Bohm; Naoko Sato	6; 3	3; 6	6; 4
3	(Sweden) (Japan)	Helena Anliot / Nina Bohm; Kiyoko Nomura / Naoko Sato	6; 3	6; 4

==== Indonesia vs. Australia ====
Indonesia
0
Rot-Weiss Tennis Club, West Berlin
May 1980
Red clay (outdoor)

Australia
3

			1	2	3
1	(Indonesia) (Australia)	Loanita Rachman; Dianne Fromholtz	2; 6	0; 6
2	(Indonesia) (Australia)	Lita Sugiarto; Wendy Turnbull	4; 6	6; 4	4; 6
3	(Indonesia) (Australia)	Lita Sugiarto / Yolanda Soemarno; Dianne Fromholtz / Susan Leo	2; 6	2; 6

=== Quarterfinals ===
==== United States vs. Soviet Union ====
United States
3
Rot-Weiss Tennis Club, West Berlin
May 1980
Red clay (outdoors)

Soviet Union
0

			1	2	3
1	(United States) (Soviet Union)	Chris Evert Lloyd; Olga Zaitseva	6; 0	6; 2
2	(United States) (Soviet Union)	Tracy Austin; Olga Morozova	6; 0	6; 1
3	(United States) (Soviet Union)	Rosemary Casals / Kathy Jordan; Julia Salnikova / Olga Zaitseva	6; 4	6; 1

==== Romania vs. Czechoslovakia ====
Romania
1
Rot-Weiss Tennis Club, West Berlin
May 1980
Red clay (outdoor)

Czechoslovakia
2

			1	2	3
1	(Romania) (Czechoslovakia)	Lucia Romanov; Renáta Tomanová	1; 6	4; 6
2	(Romania) (Czechoslovakia)	Virginia Ruzici; Hana Mandlíková	2; 6	6; 2	6; 2
3	(Romania) (Czechoslovakia)	Florența Mihai / Virginia Ruzici; Hana Mandlíková / Renáta Tomanová	6; 7	6; 3	4; 6

==== Great Britain vs. West Germany ====
Great Britain
0
Rot-Weiss Tennis Club, West Berlin
May 1980
Red clay (outdoor)

West Germany
3

			1	2	3
1	(United Kingdom) (West Germany)	Sue Barker; Bettina Bunge	2; 6	0; 6
2	(United Kingdom) (West Germany)	Virginia Wade; Sylvia Hanika	6; 4	1; 6	5; 7
3	(United Kingdom) (West Germany)	Sue Barker / Glynis Coles; Bettina Bunge / Sylvia Hanika	3; 6	3; 6

==== Sweden vs. Australia ====
Sweden
1
Rot-Weiss Tennis Club, West Berlin
May 1980
Red clay (outdoors)

Australia
2

			1	2	3
1	(Sweden) (Australia)	Lena Sandin; Dianne Fromholtz	6; 2	6; 3
2	(Sweden) (Australia)	Nina Bohm; Wendy Turnbull	1; 3	3; 2
3	(Sweden) (Australia)	Helena Anliot / Nina Bohm; Dianne Fromholtz / Wendy Turnbull	3; 6	2; 6

=== Semifinals ===
==== United States vs. Czechoslovakia ====
United States
3
Rot-Weiss Tennis Club, West Berlin
May 1980
Red clay (outdoors)

Czechoslovakia
0

			1	2	3
1	(United States) (Czechoslovakia)	Chris Evert Lloyd; Renáta Tomanová	6; 1	6; 3
2	(United States) (Czechoslovakia)	Tracy Austin; Hana Mandlíková	6; 3	4; 6	6; 2
3	(United States) (Czechoslovakia)	Rosemary Casals / Kathy Jordan; Iva Budařová / Renáta Tomanová	6; 3	6; 0

==== West Germany vs. Australia ====
West Germany
1
Rot-Weiss Tennis Club, West Berlin
May 1980
Red clay (outdoors)

Australia
2

			1	2	3
1	(West Germany) (Australia)	Bettina Bunge; Dianne Fromholtz	6; 1	6; 4
2	(West Germany) (Australia)	Sylvia Hanika; Wendy Turnbull	6; 3	4; 6	5; 7
3	(West Germany) (Australia)	Bettina Bunge / Sylvia Hanika; Dianne Fromholtz / Wendy Turnbull	4; 6	2; 6

=== Final ===
==== United States vs. Australia ====
United States
3
Rot-Weiss Tennis Club, West Berlin
25 May 1980
Red clay (outdoors)

Australia
0

			1	2	3
1	(United States) (Australia)	Chris Evert Lloyd; Dianne Fromholtz	4; 6	6; 1	6; 1
2	(United States) (Australia)	Tracy Austin; Wendy Turnbull	6; 3	6; 2
3	(United States) (Australia)	Rosemary Casals / Kathy Jordan; Dianne Fromholtz / Susan Leo	2; 6	6; 4	6; 4

1980 Federation Cup Champions
(United States)
United States
Ninth title

== Consolation rounds ==
=== Draw ===
Consolation first round
Netherlands	2
Austria	1
Norway	0
Hungary	3
Canada	2
Mexico	0
Chinese Taipei	0
Poland	3
Thailand	3
Luxembourg	0
Ireland	0
South Korea	3
Belgium	3
Israel	0
Denmark	0
France	3

Consolation quarterfinals
Netherlands	2
Hungary	1
Canada	2
Poland	0
Thailand	0
South Korea	3
Belgium	0
France	2

Consolation semifinals
Netherlands	1
Canada	2
South Korea	1
France	2

Consolation final
Canada	2
France	0

=== First round ===
==== Netherlands vs. Austria ====
Netherlands
2
Rot-Weiss Tennis Club, West Berlin
May 1980
Red clay (outdoor)

Austria
1

			1	2	3
1	(Netherlands) (Austria)	Marcella Mesker; Maria Geyer	6; 7	6; 3	2; 6
2	(Netherlands) (Austria)	Nanette Schutte; Andrea Pesak	6; 0	7; 5
3	(Netherlands) (Austria)	Karin Moos / Elly Appel; Maria Geyer / Andrea Pesak	6; 1	6; 3

==== Norway vs. Hungary ====
Norway
0
Rot-Weiss Tennis Club, West Berlin
May 1980
Red clay (outdoor)

Hungary
3

			1	2	3
1	(Norway) (Hungary)	Ellen Grindvold; Judit Szörényi	0; 6	1; 6
2	(Norway) (Hungary)	Astrid Sunde; Éva Rózsavölgyi	7; 5	1; 6	3; 6
3	(Norway) (Hungary)	Ellen Grindvold / Astrid Sunde; Anna Németh / Éva Rózsavölgyi	0; 6	5; 7

==== Canada vs. Mexico ====
Canada
2
Rot-Weiss Tennis Club, West Berlin
May 1980
Red clay (outdoor)

Mexico
0

			1	2	3
1	(Canada) (Mexico)	Marjorie Blackwood; Maluca Llamas	6; 2	6; 4
2	(Canada) (Mexico)	Karen Dewis; Alejandra Vallejo	6; 1	6; 4
3	(Canada) (Mexico)					not played

==== Chinese Taipei vs. Poland ====
Chinese Taipei
0
Rot-Weiss Tennis Club, West Berlin
May 1980
Red clay (outdoor)

Poland
3

			1	2	3
1	(Chinese Taipei) (Poland)	Wen Hsiu-tsuan; Małgorzata Sieradzka	4; 6	0; 6
2	(Chinese Taipei) (Poland)	Hsieh Li-chuan; Dorota Dziekońska	3; 6	2; 6
3	(Chinese Taipei) (Poland)	Hsieh Li-chuan / Wen Hsiu-tsuan; Dorota Dziekońska / Iwona Kuczyńska	3; 6	3; 6

==== Thailand vs. Luxembourg ====
Thailand
3
Rot-Weiss Tennis Club, West Berlin
May 1980
Red clay (outdoor)

Luxembourg
0

			1	2	3
1	(Thailand) (Luxembourg)	Suthasini Sirikaya; Rita Krombach	6; 3	6; 2
2	(Thailand) (Luxembourg)	Chalada Wattana; Monique Krecke	6; 3	6; 1
3	(Thailand) (Luxembourg)	Chalada Wattana / Chongrak Sri-Ud; Rita Krombach / Nadine Schmit	6; 3	3; 6	6; 2

==== Ireland vs. South Korea ====
Ireland
0
Rot-Weiss Tennis Club, West Berlin
May 1980
Red clay (outdoor)

South Korea
3

			1	2	3
1	(Republic of Ireland) (South Korea)	Helen Lennon; Lee Duk-hee	1; 6	0; 6
2	(Republic of Ireland) (South Korea)	Bernadette Davy; Kim Soon-ok	2; 6	0; 6
3	(Republic of Ireland) (South Korea)	Helen Lennon / Caitríona Ruane; Kim Soon-ok / Lee Duk-hee	0; 6	0; 6

==== Belgium vs. Israel ====
Belgium
0
Rot-Weiss Tennis Club, West Berlin
May 1980
Red clay (outdoor)

Israel
3

			1	2	3
1	(Belgium) (Israel)	Michele Gurdal; Paulina Peled	6; 1	6; 4
2	(Belgium) (Israel)	Monique Van Haver; Hagit Zubary	7; 6	6; 3
3	(Belgium) (Israel)	Michele Gurdal / Monique Van Haver; Orly Bialistozky / Paulina Peled	6; 2	6; 3

==== Denmark vs. France ====
Denmark
0
Rot-Weiss Tennis Club, West Berlin
May 1980
Red clay (outdoor)

France
3

			1	2	3
1	(Denmark) (France)	Dorte Ekner; Gail Benedetti	3; 6	0; 6
2	(Denmark) (France)	Anne-Mette Sorensen; Brigitte Simon	3; 6	2; 6
3	(Denmark) (France)	Dorte Ekner / Anne-Mette Sorensen; Gail Benedetti / Brigitte Simon	3; 6	5; 7

=== Quarterfinals ===
==== Netherlands vs. Hungary ====
Netherlands
2
Rot-Weiss Tennis Club, West Berlin
May 1980
Red clay (outdoor)

Hungary
1

			1	2	3
1	(Netherlands) (Hungary)	Elly Appel; Judit Szörényi	6; 3	6; 1
2	(Netherlands) (Hungary)	Karin Moos; Éva Rózsavölgyi	2; 6	7; 5	1; 6
3	(Netherlands) (Hungary)	Marcella Mesker / Nanette Schutte; Éva Rózsavölgyi / Judit Szörényi	3; 6	6; 2	6; 1

==== Canada vs. Poland ====
Canada
2
Rot-Weiss Tennis Club, West Berlin
May 1980
Red clay (outdoor)

Poland
0

			1	2	3
1	(Canada) (Poland)	Marjorie Blackwood; Dorota Dziekońska	6; 3	6; 1
2	(Canada) (Poland)	Wendy Barlow; Iwona Kuczyńska	1; 6	6; 4	6; 3
3	(Canada) (Poland)

==== Thailand vs. South Korea ====
Thailand
0
Rot-Weiss Tennis Club, West Berlin
May 1980
Red clay (outdoor)

South Korea
3

			1	2	3
1	(Thailand) (South Korea)	Suthasini Sirikaya; Lee Duk-hee	0; 6	0; 6
2	(Thailand) (South Korea)	Chalada Wattana; Kim Soon-ok	4; 6	1; 6
3	(Thailand) (South Korea)	Chalada Wattana / Suthasini Sirikaya; Kim Soon-ok / Lee Duk-hee	4; 6	2; 6

==== Belgium vs. France ====
Belgium
0
Rot-Weiss Tennis Club, West Berlin
May 1980
Red clay (outdoor)

France
2

			1	2	3
1	(Belgium) (France)	Michele Gurdal; Gail Benedetti	3; 6	7; 6	3; 6
2	(Belgium) (France)	Monique Van Haver; Brigitte Simon	4; 6	1; 6
3	(Belgium) (France)

=== Semifinals ===
==== Netherlands vs. Canada ====
Netherlands
1
Rot-Weiss Tennis Club, West Berlin
May 1980
Red clay (outdoor)

Canada
2

			1	2	3
1	(Netherlands) (Canada)	Nanette Schutte; Wendy Barlow	7; 6	6; 3
2	(Netherlands) (Canada)	Elly Appel; Marjorie Blackwood	3; 6	7; 6	6; 8
3	(Netherlands) (Canada)	Marcella Mesker / Elly Appel; Wendy Barlow / Marjorie Blackwood	6; 7	2; 6

==== South Korea vs. France ====
South Korea
1
Rot-Weiss Tennis Club, West Berlin
May 1980
Red clay (outdoor)

France
2

			1	2	3
1	(South Korea) (France)	Kim Soon-ok; Brigitte Simon	5; 7	6; 4	4; 6
2	(South Korea) (France)	Lee Duk-hee; Gail Benedetti	4; 6	6; 3	6; 3
3	(South Korea) (France)	Kim Soon-ok / Lee Duk-hee; Gail Benedetti / Frédérique Thibault	6; 3	0; 6	2; 6

=== Final ===
==== Canada vs. France ====
Canada
2
Rot-Weiss Tennis Club, West Berlin
May 1980
Red clay (outdoor)

France
0

			1	2	3
1	(Canada) (France)	Nina Bland; Frédérique Thibault	7; 6	4; 2		retired
2	(Canada) (France)	Marjorie Blackwood; Gail Benedetti	6; 3	6; 2
3	(Canada) (France)
