= 1971 Wimbledon Championships – Women's singles qualifying =

Women's singles qualifying
- 1971 Wimbledon Championships

Events
| Singles | men | women | | boys | girls |
| Doubles | men | women | mixed | boys | girls |
| WC Singles | men | women | quad |
| WC Doubles | men | women | quad |
| Legends | men | women | seniors |

Qualification
| Singles | men | women |
| Doubles | men | women | mixed |
- Wimbledon Championships

Players who neither had high enough rankings nor received wild cards to enter the main draw of the annual Wimbledon Tennis Championships participated in a qualifying tournament held one week before the event.

== Qualifiers ==
1. (United States) Becky Vest
2. (United Kingdom) Glynis Coles
3. (Australia) Vicki Lancaster
4. (Australia) Anne Coleman
5. (South Africa) Daphne Botha
6. (Rhodesia) Sally Hudson-Beck
7. (United States) Patty Ann Reese

== Qualifying draw ==
Key

- Q = Qualifier
- WC = Wild card
- LL = Lucky loser
- Alt = Alternate
- ITF = ITF entry
- PR = Protected ranking
- SR = Special ranking
- SE = Special exempt
- JE = Junior exempt
- JR = Junior Accelerator Programme entrant
- CO = College Accelerator Programme entrant
- NG = Next Gen Accelerator Program entrant
- w/o = Walkover
- r = Retired
- d = Defaulted

=== First qualifier ===
First round
1 | (United States) Becky Vest | 6 | 6
8 | (Sweden) Madelaine Pegel | 2 | 1
4 | (United Kingdom) Sandra Okin | 6 | 6
5 | (Brazil) G. Schroeder | 1 | 2
2 | (United States) Pam Austin | 6 | 6
7 | (Spain) E. Bevavides | 0 | 2
3 | (United Kingdom) Jenny Helliar | 6 | 7
6 | (Italy) Monica Giorgi | 3 | 5

Second round
(United States) Becky Vest | 6 | 6
(United Kingdom) Sandra Okin | 3 | 0
(United States) Pam Austin | 3 | 6 | 6
(United Kingdom) Jenny Helliar | 6 | 0 | 4

Qualifying competition
(United States) Becky Vest | 6 | 6
(United States) Pam Austin | 3 | 2

=== Second qualifier ===
First round
1 | (United Kingdom) Glynis Coles | 6 | 7
8 | (United Kingdom) Diane Riste | 2 | 5
4 | (Australia) Sue Hole | 6 | 6
5 | (United Kingdom) Janet Ward | 2 | 2
2 | (United Kingdom) Penny Moor | 7 | 1 | 6
7 | (Germany) Edda Buding | 5 | 6 | 1
3 | (Japan) Yaeko Matsuda | 2 | 6 | 6
6 | (Australia) Kerry Wilkinson | 6 | 1 | 2

Second round
(United Kingdom) Glynis Coles | 6 | 6
(Australia) Sue Hole | 2 | 4
(United Kingdom) Penny Moor | 6 | 8
(Japan) Yaeko Matsuda | 2 | 6

Qualifying competition
(United Kingdom) Glynis Coles | 6 | 7
(United Kingdom) Penny Moor | 4 | 5

=== Third qualifier ===
First round
1 | (Australia) Vicki Lancaster | 6 | 6
8 | (Austria) Maria Hollingsworth | 2 | 2
4 | (United States) Maricaye Christenson | 6 | 6
5 | (United Kingdom) Mary McAnally | 3 | 4
2 | (United States) Stephanie Grant | 1 | 7 | 6
7 | (France) Nathalie Fuchs | 6 | 5 | 2
3 | (United Kingdom) Judy Congdon | 9 | 6
6 | (Sweden) A. Nydens | 8 | 4

Second round
(Australia) Vicki Lancaster | 6 | 6
(United States) Maricaye Christenson | 4 | 1
(United States) Stephanie Grant | 4 | 6 | 6
(United Kingdom) Judy Congdon | 6 | 3 | 3

Qualifying competition
(Australia) Vicki Lancaster | 6 | 6
(United States) Stephanie Grant | 2 | 4

=== Fourth qualifier ===
First round
1 | (Australia) Anne Coleman | 4 | 6 | 6
8 | (United Kingdom) Lesley Charles | 6 | 4 | 3
4 | (Japan) Junko Sawamatsu | 6 | 8
5 | (South Africa) Sharon Van Brandis | 0 | 6
2 | (New Zealand) Cynthia Fleming | 7 | 6
7 | (United Kingdom) Jean Fyfe | 5 | 3
3 | (Spain) Carmen Mandarino | 6 | 6
6 | (United States) Wendy Appleby | 4 | 2

Second round
(Australia) Anne Coleman | 7 | 6
(Japan) Junko Sawamatsu | 5 | 1
(New Zealand) Cynthia Fleming | 6 | 6
(Spain) Carmen Mandarino | 2 | 1

Qualifying competition
(Australia) Anne Coleman | 6 | 6
(New Zealand) Cynthia Fleming | 3 | 4

=== Fifth qualifier ===
First round
1 | (South Africa) Daphne Botha | 6 | 7
8 | (India) Nirupama Mankad | 4 | 5
4 | (United Kingdom) Jane Poynder | 9 | 6
5 | (United States) A.A. Valentine | 8 | 0
2 | (Austria) Sonia Pachta | 6 | 6
7 | (Australia) Marilyn Tesch | 1 | 1
3 | (United States) Mary Struthers | 6 | 4 | 6
6 | (Spain) Carmen Bustamante | 3 | 6 | 2

Second round
(South Africa) Daphne Botha | 7 | 7 | 6
(United Kingdom) Jane Poynder | 9 | 5 | 4
(Austria) Sonia Pachta | 7 | 6
(United States) Mary Struthers | 5 | 0

Qualifying competition
(South Africa) Daphne Botha | 6 | 4 | 6
(Austria) Sonia Pachta | 3 | 6 | 1

=== Sixth qualifier ===
First round
1 | (Rhodesia) Sally Hudson-Beck | 7 | 6
8 | (United Kingdom) Frances Taylor | 5 | 4
4 | (United States) Tam O'Shaughnessy | 6 | 6
5 | (South Africa) Julie Koudelka | 0 | 2
2 | (United States) Patty Cody | 6 | 6
7 | (United Kingdom) Penny Hardgrave | 3 | 4
3 | (Australia) Barbara Walsh | 6 | 6
6 | (Italy) Daniela Porzio | 0 | 2

Second round
(Rhodesia) Sally Hudson-Beck | 6 | 1 | 6
(United States) Tam O'Shaughnessy | 4 | 6 | 2
(United States) Patty Cody | 7 | 3 | 6
(Australia) Barbara Walsh | 5 | 6 | 4

Qualifying competition
(Rhodesia) Sally Hudson-Beck | 6 | 9
(United States) Patty Cody | 4 | 7

=== Seventh qualifier ===
First round
1 | (United States) Patty Ann Reese | 7 | 6 | 6
8 | (United Kingdom) Wendy Slaughter | 9 | 2 | 4
4 | (United Kingdom) Lindsay Blachford | 7 | 6
5 | (Spain) Anna Marie Estalella | 5 | 2
2 | (United Kingdom) Wendy Hall | 7 | 9
7 | (Australia) J.L. Harris | 5 | 7
3 | (United States) Cynthia-Ann Thomas | 6 | 6
6 | (United States) Shari Barman | 0 | 0

Second round
(United States) Patty Ann Reese | 6 | 2 | 6
(United Kingdom) Lindsay Blachford | 1 | 6 | 4
(United Kingdom) Wendy Hall | 9 | 6
(United States) Cynthia-Ann Thomas | 8 | 1

Qualifying competition
(United States) Patty Ann Reese | 6 | 6
(United Kingdom) Wendy Hall | 3 | 4
