= 1972 Australian Open – Women's doubles =

Women's doubles
- 1972 Australian Open

Final
- Champions: (Australia) Helen Gourlay (Australia) Kerry Harris
- Runners-up: (Australia) Patricia Coleman (Australia) Karen Krantzcke
- Score: 6–0, 6–4

Details
- Draw: 12
- Seeds: 4

Events
Singles	men	women		boys	girls
Doubles	men	women	mixed	boys	girls
- Australian Open

In 1972, Margaret Court and Evonne Goolagong were the Australian Open's reigning women's doubles champions, but Court chose not to defend her title. Goolagong competed with Virginia Wade instead, losing in the semi-finals to Patricia Coleman and Karen Krantzcke. The final saw Coleman and Krantzcke beaten by Helen Gourlay and Kerry Harris 6–0, 6–4..

== Seeds ==
Champion seeds are indicated in bold text while text in italics indicates the round in which those seeds were eliminated. All four seeded teams received byes into the quarterfinals.

1. (Australia) Evonne Goolagong / (United Kingdom) Virginia Wade (semifinals)
2. (France) Gail Chanfreau / (Soviet Union) Olga Morozova (semifinals)
3. (Australia) **Helen Gourlay** / (Australia) **Kerry Harris (champions)**
4. (Australia) Patricia Coleman / (Australia) Karen Krantzcke (final)

== Draw ==
Key

- Q = Qualifier
- WC = Wild card
- LL = Lucky loser
- Alt = Alternate
- ITF = ITF entry
- PR = Protected ranking
- SR = Special ranking
- SE = Special exempt
- JE = Junior exempt
- JR = Junior Accelerator Programme entrant
- CO = College Accelerator Programme entrant
- NG = Next Gen Accelerator Program entrant
- w/o = Walkover
- r = Retired
- d = Defaulted

First round

Quarterfinals

Semifinals

Final

1
- (Australia) **E Goolagong**
- (United Kingdom) **V Wade**
w/o

- (Australia) **R Knobel**
- (Australia) **M Tesch**
**7**
7
**6**

- (Australia) R Knobel
- (Australia) M Tesch

- (Australia) S Hole
- (Australia) J Young
5
**9**
0

1
- (Australia) E Goolagong
- (United Kingdom) V Wade
**6**
4
4

4
- (Australia) **P Coleman**
- (Australia) **K Krantzcke**
2
**6**
**6**

4
- (Australia) **P Coleman**
- (Australia) **K Krantzcke**
**6**
**6**

- (Australia) D James
- (Australia) K Williams
3
4

- (Australia) A Coleman
- (Australia) C Matison
4
4

- (Australia) **A Coleman**
- (Australia) **C Matison**
**6**
**6**

4
- (Australia) Patricia Coleman
- (Australia) Karen Krantzcke
0
4

- (Australia) **B Hawcroft**
- (Australia) **W Turnbull**
**6**
**6**

3
- (Australia) **Helen Gourlay**
- (Australia) **Kerry Harris**
**6**
**6**

- (Australia) P Billing
- (Australia) J Whyte
1
3

- (Australia) B Hawcroft
- (Australia) W Turnbull
2
1

3
- (Australia) **H Gourlay**
- (Australia) **K Harris**
**6**
**6**

3
- (Australia) **H Gourlay**
- (Australia) **K Harris**
**6**
**6**

- (United States) **A Lebedeff**
- (United States) **M Schallau**
**6**
**6**

2
- (France) G Chanfreau
- (Soviet Union) O Morozova
2
2

- (Australia) L Mansfield
- (Australia) C Norquay
2
0

- (United States) A Lebedeff
- (United States) M Schallau
3
2

2
- (France) **G Chanfreau**
- (Soviet Union) **O Morozova**
**6**
**6**
