= 1970 Australian Open – Men's doubles =

Men's doubles
- 1970 Australian Open

Final
- Champions: (United States) Bob Lutz (United States) Stan Smith
- Runners-up: (Australia) John Alexander (Australia) Phil Dent
- Score: 6–3, 8–6, 6–3

Details
- Draw: 24
- Seeds: 8

Events
Singles	men	women		boys	girls
Doubles	men	women	mixed	boys	girls
- Australian Open

Bob Lutz and Stan Smith defeated John Alexander and Phil Dent 6–3, 8–6, 6–3 in the final to win the men's doubles title at the 1970 Australian Open.

== Seeds ==
All seeds receive a bye into the second round.

1. (Australia) John Newcombe / (Socialist Federal Republic of Yugoslavia) Nikola Pilić (quarterfinals)
2. (United States) Bob Lutz / (United States) Stan Smith (champions)
3. (United States) Arthur Ashe / (United States) Dennis Ralston (second round)
4. (Australia) Dick Crealy / (Australia) Allan Stone (semifinals)
5. (Netherlands) Tom Okker / (United Kingdom) Roger Taylor (second round)
6. (Australia) Mal Anderson / (Australia) Tony Roche (second round)
7. (Australia) William Bowrey / (Australia) Ray Ruffels (second round)
8. (Australia) John Alexander / (Australia) Phil Dent (final)

== Draw ==
Key

- Q = Qualifier
- WC = Wild card
- LL = Lucky loser
- Alt = Alternate
- ITF = ITF entry
- PR = Protected ranking
- SR = Special ranking
- SE = Special exempt
- JE = Junior exempt
- JR = Junior Accelerator Programme entrant
- CO = College Accelerator Programme entrant
- NG = Next Gen Accelerator Program entrant
- w/o = Walkover
- r = Retired
- d = Defaulted

=== Finals ===
Semifinals
8	(Australia) John Alexander (Australia) Phil Dent	9	6	6	6
(Australia) Syd Ball (Australia) Bob Giltinan	11	3	4	2
4	(Australia) Dick Crealy (Australia) Allan Stone	4	4	4
2	(United States) Bob Lutz (United States) Stan Smith	6	6	6

Final
8	(Australia) John Alexander (Australia) Phil Dent	3	6	3
2	(United States) Bob Lutz (United States) Stan Smith	6	8	6

=== Section 1 ===
First round
(United Kingdom) G Battrick (United States) L Schloss	7	10
(Australia) J Brown (Australia) A Hammond	5	8
(United States) T Gorman (United States) J McManus	1	9	6
(Australia) K Coombes (Australia) G Pollard	6	7	4
(Australia) S Ball (Australia) B Giltinan
(France) B Paul (Switzerland) M Werren	w/o
(Australia) B Carmichael (Australia) R Keldie	6	6
(France) P Loizeau (Australia) A Shapter	2	2

Second round
1	(Australia) J Newcombe (Socialist Federal Republic of Yugoslavia) N Pilić	6	6
(United Kingdom) G Battrick (United States) L Schloss	3	4
(United States) T Gorman (United States) J McManus	9	3
8	(Australia) J Alexander (Australia) P Dent	11	6
3	(United States) A Ashe (United States) D Ralston	7	6	4
(Australia) S Ball (Australia) B Giltinan	9	4	6
(Australia) B Carmichael (Australia) R Keldie
6	(Australia) M Anderson (Australia) T Roche	w/o

Quarterfinals
1	(Australia) J Newcombe (Socialist Federal Republic of Yugoslavia) N Pilić	4	9
8	(Australia) J Alexander (Australia) P Dent	6	11
(Australia) S Ball (Australia) B Giltinan	16	6	6
(Australia) B Carmichael (Australia) R Keldie	18	1	2

Semifinals
8	(Australia) J Alexander (Australia) P Dent	9	6	6	6
(Australia) S Ball (Australia) B Giltinan	11	3	4	2

=== Section 2 ===
First round
(United States) N Neely (United States) D Dell	1	8	7
(Czechoslovakia) J Kukal (Czechoslovakia) V Zednik	6	6	9
(Australia) J Bartlett (Australia) G Masters
(Greece) E Argyriou (Belgium) Pieter Verstraeten	w/o
(Australia) A Gardiner (Australia) F Sedgman	w/o
(Australia) J Cooper (Australia) B Phillips-Moore
(Australia) C Dibley (Australia) P Doerner	9	6
(Indonesia) S Sugiarto (Indonesia) G Widjojo	7	2

Second round
4	(Australia) D Crealy (Australia) A Stone	5	6	6
(Czechoslovakia) J Kukal (Czechoslovakia) V Zednik	7	3	4
(Australia) J Bartlett (Australia) G Masters	13	7
5	(Netherlands) T Okker (United Kingdom) R Taylor	11	5
7	(Australia) W Bowrey (Australia) R Ruffels	15	3
(Australia) J Cooper (Australia) B Phillips-Moore	17	6
(Australia) C Dibley (Australia) P Doerner	8	4
2	(United States) B Lutz (United States) S Smith	10	6

Quarterfinals
4	(Australia) D Crealy (Australia) A Stone	5	6	6
(Australia) J Bartlett (Australia) G Masters	7	3	4
(Australia) J Cooper (Australia) B Phillips-Moore	3	4
2	(United States) B Lutz (United States) S Smith	6	6

Semifinals
4	(Australia) D Crealy (Australia) A Stone	4	4	4
2	(United States) B Lutz (United States) S Smith	6	6	6
