= Anne Coleman (tennis) =

Australian tennis player

- Country (sports): Australia

Singles

Grand Slam singles results
- Australian Open: 1R (1971, 1972)
- Wimbledon: 1R (1971)

Doubles

Grand Slam doubles results
- Australian Open: QF (1972)

Anne Coleman is an Australian former professional tennis player.

Coleman, a Western Australian junior champion, was ranked amongst the top 10 juniors in the country. She qualified for the singles main draw of the 1971 Wimbledon Championships and was a women's doubles quarter-finalist at the 1972 Australian Open (with Christine Matison). She is of no relation to her contemporary Patricia Coleman.
