= 1972 Australian Open – Men's doubles =

Men's doubles
- 1972 Australian Open

Final
- Champions: (Australia) Owen Davidson (Australia) Ken Rosewall
- Runners-up: (Australia) Ross Case (Australia) Geoff Masters
- Score: 3–6, 7–6, 6–2

Details
- Draw: 23
- Seeds: 8

Events
Singles	men	women		boys	girls
Doubles	men	women	mixed	boys	girls
- Australian Open

John Newcombe and Tony Roche were the defending champions.

== Seeds ==
1. (Australia) John Newcombe / (Australia) Tony Roche (semifinals)
2. (Australia) Owen Davidson / (Australia) Ken Rosewall (champion)
3. (Australia) John Alexander / (Australia) Mal Anderson (second round)
4. (Australia) John Cooper / (Australia) Colin Dibley (quarterfinals)
5. (Australia) Dick Crealy / (Australia) Allan Stone (semifinals)
6. (Australia) Bill Lloyd / (Australia) Bob Rheinberger (second round)
7. (Australia) Neale Fraser / (Soviet Union) Aleksandre Metreweli (second round)
8. (Australia) Syd Ball / (Australia) John Bartlett (quarterfinals)

== Draw ==
Key

- Q = Qualifier
- WC = Wild card
- LL = Lucky loser
- Alt = Alternate
- ITF = ITF entry
- PR = Protected ranking
- SR = Special ranking
- SE = Special exempt
- JE = Junior exempt
- JR = Junior Accelerator Programme entrant
- CO = College Accelerator Programme entrant
- NG = Next Gen Accelerator Program entrant
- w/o = Walkover
- r = Retired
- d = Defaulted

=== Finals ===
Semifinals
1	(Australia) John Newcombe (Australia) Tony Roche	7	4	2r
(Australia) Ross Case (Australia) Geoff Masters	5	6	2
5	(Australia) Dick Crealy (Australia) Allan Stone	4	6
2	(Australia) Owen Davidson (Australia) Ken Rosewall	6	7

Final
(Australia) Ross Case (Australia) Geoff Masters	6	6	2
2	(Australia) Owen Davidson (Australia) Ken Rosewall	3	7	6

=== Top half ===
First round
(Australia) M Cocks (Australia) J James	6	0	2
(Australia) E Ewert (Australia) M Rose	4	6	6
(Australia) R Case (Australia) G Masters	7	6
(Australia) R Frawley (Australia) C Letcher	6	3
(Australia) A Haswell (Australia) M Phillips
(Japan) J Kuki (Japan) K Tanabe	w/o

Second round
1	(Australia) J Newcombe (Australia) T Roche	6	6
(Australia) P Fitzgerald (Australia) K Jorgenson	4	3
(Australia) E Ewert (Australia) M Rose	2	4
8	(Australia) S Ball (Australia) J Bartlett	6	6
6	(Australia) W Lloyd (Australia) B Rheinberger
(Australia) R Case (Australia) G Masters	w/o
(Japan) J Kuki (Japan) K Tanabe	3	7	4
4	(Australia) J Cooper (Australia) C Dibley	6	6	6

Quarterfinals
1	(Australia) J Newcombe (Australia) T Roche	7	6
8	(Australia) S Ball (Australia) J Bartlett	6	3
(Australia) R Case (Australia) G Masters	6	6
4	(Australia) J Cooper (Australia) C Dibley	3	1

Semifinals
1	(Australia) J Newcombe (Australia) T Roche	7	4	2r
(Australia) R Case (Australia) G Masters	5	6	2

=== Bottom half ===
First round
(France) P Dominguez (France) P Proisy	6	6
(Australia) G Thomson (Czechoslovakia) J Zigmund	2	3
(Australia) I Fletcher (Australia) B Phillips-Moore	6	7
(Australia) J Hillebrand (Australia) C Stubs	1	6
(Australia) B Giltinan (Australia) G Perkins	4	6	6
(Australia) A Gardiner (Australia) A Hammond	6	4	4
(France) J-P Meyer (France) W N'Godrella	3	6	6
(Australia) A McDonald (Australia) K Warwick	6	3	4

Second round
3	(Australia) J Alexander (Australia) M Anderson	7	6	5
(France) P Dominguez (France) P Proisy	5	7	7
(Australia) I Fletcher (Australia) B Phillips-Moore	7	3	5
5	(Australia) D Crealy (Australia) A Stone	6	6	7
7	(Australia) N Fraser (Soviet Union) A Metreweli	7	4	4
(Australia) B Giltinan (Australia) G Perkins	6	6	6
(France) J-P Meyer (France) W N'Godrella	4	4
2	(Australia) O Davidson (Australia) K Rosewall	6	6

Quarterfinals
(France) P Dominguez (France) P Proisy	6	6
5	(Australia) D Crealy (Australia) A Stone	7	7
(Australia) B Giltinan (Australia) G Perkins	2	7	4
2	(Australia) O Davidson (Australia) K Rosewall	6	6	6

Semifinals
5	(Australia) D Crealy (Australia) A Stone	4	6
2	(Australia) O Davidson (Australia) K Rosewall	6	7
