= Mashonaland Championships =

Defunct tennis tournament
- Tour: ILTF World Circuit (1950–1972); ILTF Independent Circuit (1973–1979)
- Founded: 1949; 76 years ago
- Abolished: 1979; 46 years ago
- Location: Salisbury, Rhodesia
- Surface: Clay / outdoor

The Mashonaland Championships was a combined men's and women's tennis tournament founded in 1949 as the Mashonaland Lawn Tennis Championships. The tournament was played Salisbury, Mashonaland, Rhodesia, and ran annually until 1979 when it was discontinued as part of the ILTF Independent Circuit.

== History ==
In 1949 the first Mashonaland Championships were founded. The tournament was organised by the Mashonaland Lawn Tennis Board and affiliated to the Rhodesia Lawn Tennis Association. The event was played annually on outdoor clay courts. It initially ran annually as part of the ILTF African Circuit, a regional sub circuit of the ILTF World Circuit from 1949 to 1969 for men, then 1972 for women before it then became part of the ILTF Independent Circuit (those events not part of the men's ILTF Grand Prix Circuit or women's Virginia Slims Circuit until 1979 when it was abolished.

== Finals ==
=== Men's singles ===
(incomplete roll)

| Year | Champions | Runners-up | Score |
|---|---|---|---|
↓ ILTF World Circuit ↓
| 1959 | (Southern Rhodesia) Don Black | (Kenya) Yashvin Shretta | 6–4, 6–3. |
| 1964 | (Southern Rhodesia) Don Black (2) | (South Africa) Cliff Drysdale | 6–4, 3–6, 6–2. |
| 1967 | (United States) Jim McManus | (India) Ramanathan Krishnan | 6–4, 3–6, 6–4. |
↓ Open Era ↓
| 1969 | (Rhodesia) Andrew Pattison | (Rhodesia) Hank Irvine | 6–3, 5–7, 6–4. |
↓ ILTF Independent Circuit ↓
| 1970 | (Rhodesia) Hank Irvine | (Rhodesia) Adrian Bey | 6–4, 6–4. |
| 1971 | (Rhodesia) Andrew Pattison | (Jamaica) Richard Russell | 6–2, 6–2. |

=== Women's singles ===
(incomplete roll)

| Year | Champions | Runners-up | Score |
|---|---|---|---|
↓ ILTF World Circuit ↓
| 1966 | (Rhodesia) Pat Walkden | (Netherlands) Gertruida Walhof | 6–4, 4–6, 7–5 |
| 1967 | (Rhodesia) Pat Walkden (2) | (United Kingdom) Frances Maclennan | 6–1, 6–0 |
| 1969 | (Rhodesia) Deidre Allan | (New Zealand) Beverley Billington | 6–3, 6–3 |
↓ Open Era ↓
| 1970 | (Rhodesia) Deidre Allan (2) | (Rhodesia) Jenny Waggott | 6–2, 4–6, 6–4 |
| 1971 | (Rhodesia) Karen Irvine | (South Africa) Maryna Godwin | 6–4, 1–6, 6–2 |
| 1972 | (South Africa) Marianna Brummer | (Rhodesia) Sally Hudson-Beck | 7–5, 4–6, 6–2 |
↓ ILTF Independent Circuit ↓
| 1973 | (Rhodesia) Sally Hudson-Beck | (Kenya) Deidre Paterson | 6–3, 2–6, 6–3 |
