= 1972 Australian Open – Men's singles =

Men's singles
- 1972 Australian Open

Final
- Champion: (Australia) Ken Rosewall
- Runner-up: (Australia) Mal Anderson
- Score: 7–6^{(7–2)}, 6–3, 7–5

Details
- Draw: 50
- Seeds: 12

Events
Singles	men	women		boys	girls
Doubles	men	women	mixed	boys	girls
- Australian Open

Defending champion Ken Rosewall defeated Mal Anderson in the final, 7–6^{(7–2)}, 6–3, 7–5 to win the men's singles tennis title at the 1972 Australian Open. It was his eighth and last Grand Slam tournament singles title, and at 37 years, 2 months and 1 day old, he became the oldest major champion in men's singles in the Open Era, a record that still stands.

== Seeds ==
The seeded players are listed below. Ken Rosewall is the champion; others show the round in which they were eliminated.

1. (Australia) John Newcombe (quarterfinals)
2. (Australia) Ken Rosewall (champion)
3. (Australia) John Alexander (third round)
4. (Soviet Union) Alex Metreveli (semifinals)
5. (Australia) Owen Davidson (second round)
6. (Australia) Tony Roche (withdrew before the tournament began)
7. (Australia) Colin Dibley (third round)
8. (Australia) Mal Anderson (finals)
9. (Australia) Dick Crealy (quarterfinals)
10. (Australia) Allan Stone (semifinals)
11. (Australia) John Cooper (quarterfinals)
12. (Australia) Geoff Masters (second round)

== Draw ==
=== Key ===
- Q = Qualifier
- WC = Wild card
- LL = Lucky loser
- r = Retired

=== Final eight ===
Quarterfinals
1	(Australia) John Newcombe	6	3	4	6	7
8	(Australia) Mal Anderson	2	6	6	3	9
11	(Australia) John Cooper	2	6	4	2
4	(Soviet Union) Alex Metreveli	6	3	6	6
(Australia) Barry Phillips-Moore	6	5	6	3
10	(Australia) Allan Stone	4	7	7	6
9	(Australia) Dick Crealy	3	1	3
2	(Australia) Ken Rosewall	6	6	6

Semifinals
8	(Australia) Mal Anderson	6	7	7
4	(Soviet Union) Alex Metreveli	2	6	6
10	(Australia) Allan Stone	6	1	6	2
2	(Australia) Ken Rosewall	7	6	3	6

Final
8	(Australia) Mal Anderson	6	3	5
2	(Australia) Ken Rosewall	7	6	7

=== Section 1 ===
First round
(Australia) J Bartlett	7	6	6
(Australia) W Durham	6	2	3
(Australia) A McDonald	6	6	6
(Australia) S Myers	2	4	4
(Australia) A Hammond	3	3	4
(Australia) N Fraser	6	6	6
(France) W N'Godrella	6	7	3	6
(Australia) W Coghlan	3	6	6	3

Second round
1	(Australia) J Newcombe	6	7	6
(Australia) J Bartlett	2	6	3
(Australia) A McDonald	6	4	3	2
(France) P Dominguez	4	6	6	6
12	(Australia) G Masters	5	5	2
(Australia) N Fraser	7	7	6
(France) W N'Godrella	4	6	1	3
8	(Australia) M Anderson	6	3	6	6

Third round
1	(Australia) J Newcombe	6	6	6
(France) P Dominguez	1	3	1
(Australia) N Fraser	2	3	1
8	(Australia) M Anderson	6	6	6

Quarterfinals
1	(Australia) J Newcombe	6	3	4	6	7
8	(Australia) M Anderson	2	6	6	3	9

=== Section 2 ===
First round
(Australia) R Casey	1	0	3
(Australia) F Sedgman	6	6	6
(Australia) R Case	6	6	6
(Australia) C Stubs	1	3	1
(Australia) B Lloyd	w/o
(Australia) J Stephens
(Australia) M Phillips	4	4	4
(Japan) K Tanabe	6	6	6

Second round
5	(Australia) O Davidson	3	6	1	5
(Australia) F Sedgman	6	1	6	7
(France) P Proisy	6	3	4	2
11	(Australia) J Cooper	4	6	6	6
(Australia) R Case	6	3	6	7
(Australia) J Stephens	4	6	2	5
(Japan) K Tanabe	3	2	2
4	(Soviet Union) A Metreveli	6	6	6

Third round
(Australia) F Sedgman	6	3	1	3
11	(Australia) J Cooper	3	6	6	6
(Australia) R Case	2	6	4	2
4	(Soviet Union) A Metreveli	6	3	6	6

Quarterfinals
11	(Australia) J Cooper	2	6	4	2
4	(Soviet Union) A Metreveli	6	3	6	6

=== Section 3 ===
First round
(Australia) R Rheinberger	w/o
(Australia) I Fletcher
(Australia) S Ball	3	7	5	5
(Australia) J James	6	5	7	7
(Australia) R Frawley	3	1	1
(Australia) B Phillips-Moore	6	6	6
(Australia) A Gardiner	6	2	6
(Australia) K Warwick	7	6	7
(Australia) G Thomson	4	6	5	6
(Australia) M Cocks	6	4	7	7
(Czechoslovakia) J Zigmund	3	7	6	4	6
(Canada) D McCormick	6	6	4	6	2

Second round
3	(Australia) J Alexander	6	7	6
(Australia) I Fletcher	3	5	4
(Australia) J James	3	6	3
(Australia) B Phillips-Moore	6	7	6
10	(Australia) A Stone	7	7	6
(Australia) K Warwick	5	5	3
(Australia) M Cocks	6	7	4	1	6
(Czechoslovakia) J Zigmund	4	5	6	6	1

Third round
3	(Australia) J Alexander	3	6	6	6	3
(Australia) B Phillips-Moore	6	1	7	1	6
10	(Australia) A Stone	6	6	6
(Australia) M Cocks	1	2	3

Quarterfinals
(Australia) B Phillips-Moore	6	5	6	3
10	(Australia) A Stone	4	7	7	6

=== Section 4 ===
First round
(Australia) P Kronk	5	3	1
(Australia) M Rose	7	6	6
(Australia) B Giltinan	6	3	7	6
(Australia) K Hancock	1	6	5	4
(Australia) C Letcher	6	0	6	6
(Australia) G Perkins	1	6	1	4
(Japan) J Kuki
(Australia) A Haswell	w/o

Second round
7	(Australia) C Dibley	6	6	7
(Australia) M Rose	1	4	6
(Australia) B Giltinan	6	5	1	6	11
9	(Australia) D Crealy	1	7	6	4	13
(France) J-P Meyer	6	2	7	6	8
(Australia) C Letcher	4	6	6	7	6
(Japan) J Kuki	3	2	1
2	(Australia) K Rosewall	6	6	6

Third round
7	(Australia) C Dibley	4	6	3
9	(Australia) D Crealy	6	7	6
(France) J-P Meyer	3	1	3
2	(Australia) K Rosewall	6	6	6

Quarterfinals
9	(Australia) D Crealy	3	1	3
2	(Australia) K Rosewall	6	6	6

Preceded by 1971 U.S. Open	Grand Slam men's singles	Succeeded by 1972 French Open
