= Lee Soon-oh =

South Korean tennis player

- Country (sports): South Korea
- Born: 4 October 1953 (age 71)

Singles

Grand Slam singles results
- Australian Open: 1R (1973)
- French Open: Q3 (1973)

Doubles

Grand Slam doubles results
- Australian Open: 1R (1973)

Lee Soon-oh (born 4 October 1953) is a South Korean former professional tennis player.

Lee, an All-Korea singles champion, was active on tour in the 1970s. In 1972 she won the Hong Kong Hardcourt mixed doubles title (with Colin Dibley). She appeared in singles and doubles main draws at the 1973 Australian Open. In 1974 she won two medals for South Korea at the Asian Games in Tehran, a gold in the team event and silver in women's doubles. She featured in six Federation Cup ties for South Korea during her career, all as a doubles specialist.
