= Sue Alexander (tennis) =

Australian tennis player

- Full name: Susan Joy Alexander
- Country (sports): Australia

Singles

Grand Slam singles results
- Australian Open: 3R (1970)
- Wimbledon: 2R (1967, 1970, 1971)

Doubles

Grand Slam doubles results
- Australian Open: QF (1970)
- Wimbledon: 2R (1967)

Susan Joy Alexander is an Australian former professional tennis player.

Raised in Sydney, Australia, Alexander is an elder sister of tennis player John Alexander and began competing on tour during the 1960s. She featured in the singles second round at Wimbledon on three occasions and made the mixed doubles round of 16 with her brother in 1967. Her best Australian Open performance came in 1970 when she made the third round of the singles and was a quarter-finalist in women's doubles.
