= 1970 Australian Open – Men's singles =

Men's singles
- 1970 Australian Open

Final
- Champion: (United States) Arthur Ashe
- Runner-up: (Australia) Dick Crealy
- Score: 6–4, 9–7, 6–2

Details
- Draw: 48
- Seeds: 16

Events
Singles	men	women		boys	girls
Doubles	men	women	mixed	boys	girls
- Australian Open

Arthur Ashe defeated Dick Crealy in the final, 6–4, 9–7, 6–2 to win the men's singles tennis title at the 1970 Australian Open. It was his second major singles title.

Rod Laver was the reigning champion, but chose not to compete this year. The first round was best-of-three sets, and the rest of the tournament was best-of-five.

== Seeds ==
All seeds receive a bye into the second round.

1. (Australia) Tony Roche (quarterfinals)
2. (Australia) John Newcombe (quarterfinals)
3. (Netherlands) Tom Okker (quarterfinals)
4. (United States) Arthur Ashe (champion)
5. (United States) Stan Smith (third round)
6. (United States) Dennis Ralston (semifinals)
7. (Socialist Federal Republic of Yugoslavia) Nikola Pilić (third round)
8. (United Kingdom) Roger Taylor (semifinals)
9. (United States) Robert Lutz (third round)
10. (Australia) Ray Ruffels (quarterfinals)
11. (Australia) Allan Stone (third round)
12. (Australia) Dick Crealy (final)
13. (Australia) William Bowrey (third round)
14. (Australia) John Alexander (third round)
15. (United Kingdom) Gerald Battrick (third round)
16. (Australia) Bob Carmichael (second round)

== Draw ==
Key

- Q = Qualifier
- WC = Wild card
- LL = Lucky loser
- Alt = Alternate
- ITF = ITF entry
- PR = Protected ranking
- SR = Special ranking
- SE = Special exempt
- JE = Junior exempt
- JR = Junior Accelerator Programme entrant
- CO = College Accelerator Programme entrant
- NG = Next Gen Accelerator Program entrant
- w/o = Walkover
- r = Retired
- d = Defaulted

=== Final eight ===
Quarterfinals
1	(Australia) Tony Roche	7	5	5
8	(United Kingdom) Roger Taylor	9	7	7
3	(Netherlands) Tom Okker	1	6	6	5	3
12	(Australia) Dick Crealy	6	3	4	7	6
10	(Australia) Ray Ruffels	8	3	4	2
4	(United States) Arthur Ashe	6	6	6	6
6	(United States) Dennis Ralston	19	20	4	6
2	(Australia) John Newcombe	17	18	6	3

Semifinals
8	(United Kingdom) Roger Taylor	4	11	3	6	6
12	(Australia) Dick Crealy	6	9	6	4	8
4	(United States) Arthur Ashe	6	8	6	2
6	(United States) Dennis Ralston	3	10	3	1	r

Final
12	(Australia) Dick Crealy	4	7	2
4	(United States) Arthur Ashe	6	9	6

=== Section 1 ===
First round
(Australia) J Cooper
(United Kingdom) R Wilson	w/o
(Czechoslovakia) J Kukal	6	12
(Australia) A Hammond	4	10
(Australia) G Pollard	5	4
(United States) L Schloss	7	6
(Australia) M Anderson	w/o
(Switzerland) M Werren

Second round
1	(Australia) T Roche	8	11	6
(Australia) J Cooper	6	9	4
(Czechoslovakia) J Kukal	6	3	6	0	4
15	(United Kingdom) G Battrick	2	6	2	6	6
8	(United Kingdom) R Taylor	6	6	6
(United States) L Schloss	4	3	4
(Switzerland) M Werren	1	3	1
9	(United States) R Lutz	6	6	6

Third round
1	(Australia) T Roche	6	6	6
15	(United Kingdom) G Battrick	2	2	4
8	(United Kingdom) R Taylor	1	2	6	12	6
9	(United States) R Lutz	6	6	4	10	3

Quarterfinals
1	(Australia) T Roche	7	5	5
8	(United Kingdom) R Taylor	9	7	7

=== Section 2 ===
First round
(Australia) A McDonald	5	4
(United States) K Stuart	7	6
(Australia) A Shapter	6	4
(Australia) R Keldie	8	6
(Australia) A Gardiner
(Jamaica) R Russell	w/o
(Australia) P Doerner	7	6	4
(Australia) J Brown	9	0	6

Second round
3	(Netherlands) T Okker	6	6	7
(United States) K Stuart	4	2	5
(Australia) R Keldie	3	1	r
14	(Australia) J Alexander	6	2
12	(Australia) D Crealy	6	10	12
(Australia) A Gardiner	4	8	10
(Australia) J Brown	1	6	4
5	(United States) S Smith	6	8	6

Third round
3	(Netherlands) T Okker	7	10	10	4	6
14	(Australia) J Alexander	5	8	12	6	4
12	(Australia) D Crealy	6	6	14
5	(United States) S Smith	4	4	12

Quarterfinals
3	(Netherlands) T Okker	1	6	6	5	3
12	(Australia) D Crealy	6	3	4	7	6

=== Section 3 ===
First round
(United States) T Gorman	6	6
(Australia) S Ball	1	1
(Australia) B Phillips-Moore	6	8	6
(Australia) C Dibley	3	10	4
(Australia) F Sedgman	6	3	6
(France) B Paul	4	6	3
(Australia) G Masters	6	7
(Australia) K Coombes	4	5

Second round
7	(Socialist Federal Republic of Yugoslavia) N Pilić	6	13	9	3	6
(United States) T Gorman	3	11	11	6	1
(Australia) B Phillips-Moore	6	4	6	5
10	(Australia) R Ruffels	8	6	1	7
13	(Australia) W Bowrey	6	1	6	4	7
(Australia) F Sedgman	2	6	3	6	5
(Australia) G Masters	15	2	3
4	(United States) A Ashe	17	6	6

Third round
7	(Socialist Federal Republic of Yugoslavia) N Pilić	5	4	7	5
10	(Australia) R Ruffels	7	6	5	7
13	(Australia) W Bowrey	3	7	4
4	(United States) A Ashe	6	9	6

Quarterfinals
10	(Australia) R Ruffels	8	3	4	2
4	(United States) A Ashe	6	6	6	6

=== Section 4 ===
First round
(Australia) J Bartlett	19	3	2
(Czechoslovakia) V Zedník	17	6	6
(United States) J McManus	6	7	3
(Australia) B Giltinan	4	9	6
(Australia) P Dent	6	6
(Australia) R Brent	4	3
(Australia) I Bidmeade	w/o
(United States) E Neely

Second round
6	(United States) D Ralston	6	6	4	6
(Czechoslovakia) V Zedník	3	3	6	4
(Australia) B Giltinan	5	3	6	1
11	(Australia) A Stone	7	6	3	6
16	(Australia) B Carmichael	1	r
(Australia) P Dent	2
(United States) E Neely	1	5	1
2	(Australia) J Newcombe	6	7	6

Third round
6	(United States) D Ralston	6	6	6
11	(Australia) A Stone	2	3	2
(Australia) P Dent	2	3	3
2	(Australia) J Newcombe	6	6	6

Quarterfinals
6	(United States) D Ralston	19	20	4	6
2	(Australia) J Newcombe	17	18	6	3

Preceded by 1969 U.S. Open – Men's singles	Grand Slam men's singles	Succeeded by 1970 French Open – Men's singles
