= 1972 Australian Open =

- Date: 26 December 1971 – 3 January 1972
- Edition: 60th
- Category: Grand Slam (ITF)
- Surface: Grass
- Location: Melbourne, Australia
- Venue: Kooyong Lawn Tennis Club

Champions

Men's singles
- (Australia) Ken Rosewall

Women's singles
- (United Kingdom) Virginia Wade

Men's doubles
- (Australia) Owen Davidson / (Australia) Ken Rosewall

Women's doubles
- (Australia) Kerry Harris / (Australia) Helen Gourlay
- Australian Open

The 1972 Australian Open was a tennis tournament played on grass courts at the Kooyong Lawn Tennis Club in Melbourne in Australia and was held from 26 December 1971 to 3 January 1972. It was the 60th edition of the Australian Open and the first Grand Slam of the year.

== Finals ==
=== Men's singles ===
(Australia) Ken Rosewall defeated (Australia) Malcolm Anderson 7–6^{(7–2)}, 6–3, 7–5

- It was Rosewall's 16th career Grand Slam title (his 8th in singles) and his 6th Australian title.

=== Women's singles ===
(United Kingdom) Virginia Wade defeated (Australia) Evonne Goolagong 6–4, 6–4

- It was Wade's 2nd career Grand Slam title and her 1st Australian title.

=== Men's doubles ===
(Australia) Owen Davidson / (Australia) Ken Rosewall defeated (Australia) Ross Case / (Australia) Geoff Masters 3–6, 7–6, 6–3

- It was Davidson's 1st career Grand Slam title and his only Australian title. It was Rosewall's 17th career Grand Slam title and his 7th and last Australian title.

=== Women's doubles ===
(Australia) Helen Gourlay / (Australia) Kerry Harris defeated (Australia) Patricia Coleman / (Australia) Karen Krantzcke 6–0, 6–4

- It was Gourlay's 1st career Grand Slam title and her 1st Australian title. It was Harris' only career Grand Slam title and her only Australian title.

=== Mixed doubles ===
Competition not held between 1970 and 1986.

Preceded by 1971 US Open	Grand Slams	Succeeded by 1972 French Open
