= Kerry Wilkinson (tennis) =

Australian tennis player

- Country (sports): Australia

Singles

Grand Slam singles results
- Australian Open: 3R (1970)
- French Open: 2R (1966)
- Wimbledon: Q1 (1971)

Doubles

Grand Slam doubles results
- Australian Open: (1970, 1973)

Kerry Wilkinson is an Australian former professional tennis player.

Wilkinson's best performance in a grand slam tournament was a third round appearance at the 1970 Australian Open, where she was beaten by the top seed and eventual champion Margaret Court.
