= Christina Sandberg =

Swedish former tennis player (born 1948)

- Country (sports): Sweden
- Born: 11 January 1948 (age 77); Borås, Sweden

Singles
- Career record: 30–28

Grand Slam singles results
- Australian Open: QF (1970)
- French Open: 3R (1970)
- Wimbledon: 4R (1970)
- US Open: 3R (1970)

Doubles
- Career record: 13–20

Christina Sandberg (born 11 January 1948) is a former professional tennis player from Sweden. She reached the quarterfinals of the 1970 Australian Open in both the singles and doubles. She played for Sweden in the Federation Cup in 25 matches, and she notably defeated Virginia Wade in the first round of the 1968 Wimbledon Championships.

== Federation Cup ==
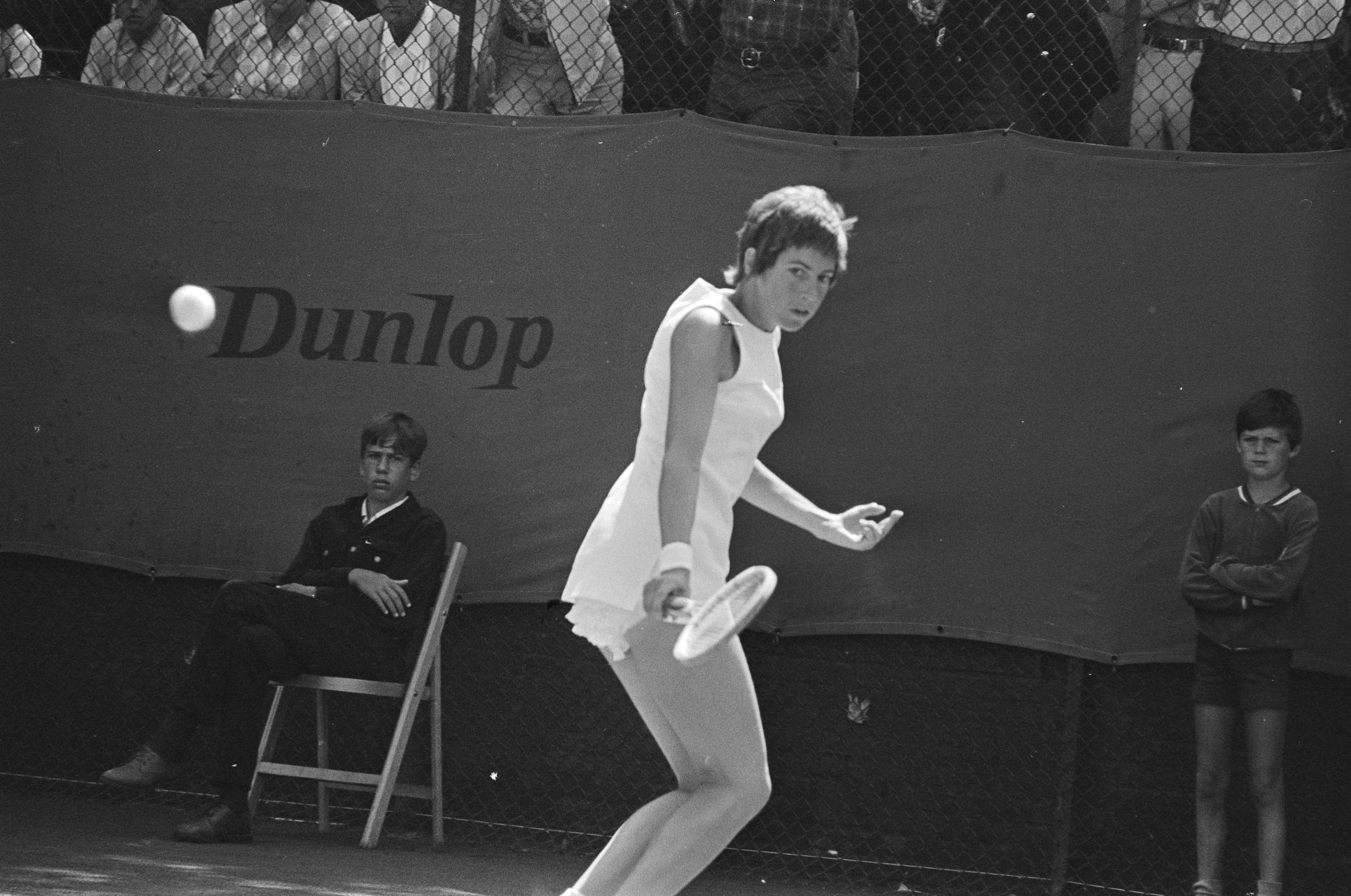
Christina Sandberg at the 1971 Dutch Open

Sandberg first played for Sweden in the Federation Cup on 10 May 1966 in Turin against Italy, beating Jacqueline Morales 7–9, 6–3, 6–2. She played her last Federation Cup match in May 1974 against Poland in Naples, losing to Barbara Kral 6–1, 6–1.

All together, she played 16 singles, winning 9, and 9 doubles, winning 5.

== Swedish Open ==
Sandberg became the first Swedish player to win the Swedish Open twice running when she won it in 1965 and 1966.
