= Kerry Ballard =

Australian tennis player

- Country (sports): Australia
- Born: 16 December 1949 (age 75)

Singles

Grand Slam singles results
- Australian Open: 2R (1968, 1973)
- Wimbledon: Q2 (1973)

Doubles

Grand Slam doubles results
- Australian Open: QF (1970)

Kerry Ballard (born Kerry Hogarth; 16 December 1949) is an Australian former professional tennis player.

Ballard, a NSW junior state champion, grew up in the north of Sydney. She was a women's doubles quarter-finalist at the 1970 Australian Open and twice played in the second round of the singles.

Active on the ITF senior circuit, Ballard is regarded as the world's top player over the age of 70 and was named Australian Senior Tennis Player of the Year in 2020.
