= Monique Van Haver =

Belgian tennis player

- Country (sports): Belgium
- Born: 31 August 1948 (age 76)

Singles

Grand Slam singles results
- Australian Open: 2R (1973, 1975)
- French Open: 1R (1969, 1974, 1976)

Doubles

Grand Slam doubles results
- Australian Open: 2R (1973)
- French Open: QF (1976)
- Wimbledon: 2R (1974, 1975)

Monique Van Haver (born 31 August 1948) is a Belgian former professional tennis player.

== Biography ==
Van Haver was a regular member of the Belgium Federation Cup team throughout the 1970s. She featured in a total of 30 ties during her career, with a 22/28 overall win–loss record from 50 matches.

Her doubles partnership with Michèle Gurdal resulted in 11 Federation Cup wins and is Belgium's most successful. The pair made the women's doubles quarter-finals together at the 1976 French Open.

Following her retirement, Van Haver worked as a tennis coach around Brussels.
