= Barbara Hawcroft =

Australian tennis player

- Country (sports): Australia
- Born: 13 October 1950 (age 74); Brisbane, Australia

Singles

Grand Slam singles results
- Australian Open: QF (1972)
- Wimbledon: 3R (1971, 1972)
- US Open: 2R (1972)

Doubles

Grand Slam doubles results
- Australian Open: QF (1971, 1972)
- Wimbledon: 2R (1971)
- US Open: 1R (1972)

Grand Slam mixed doubles results
- Wimbledon: 3R (1971)
- US Open: 1R (1972)

Barbara Hawcroft (born 13 October 1950) is an Australian former professional tennis player. She is the younger sister of squash player Marion Jackman.

Hawcroft was a quarter-finalist at the 1972 Australian Open and twice reached the third round at Wimbledon.
