= Anthony Hammond (tennis) =

Australian tennis player

- Country (sports): Australia
- Born: 16 March 1950 (age 75)

Singles
- Career record: 9–18

Grand Slam singles results
- Australian Open: 1R (1967, 1968, 1969, 1970, 1971, 1972)
- French Open: Q2 (1969)
- Wimbledon: Q2 (1969)

Doubles
- Career record: 0–6

Grand Slam doubles results
- Australian Open: 2R (1974)
- French Open: 3R (1969)
- Wimbledon: 1R (1970)

Anthony Hammond (born 16 March 1950) is an Australian former professional tennis player.

Hammond, a native of Perth, was a state Linton Cup representative and made the quarter-finals of the Western Australian Open in 1969. He featured in the singles main draw at six editions of the Australian Open without going past the first round. After leaving the tour he was head tennis pro at the Middletown Tennis Club in Ohio.
