= Ellen Grindvold =

Norwegian basketball and tennis player

Personal information
- Born: July 30, 1946 (age 80)

Ellen Louise Grindvold (born July 30, 1946) is a former Norwegian female basketball and professional tennis player. She played for the Norwegian Fed Cup team in 1983.
