= 1970 Australian Open =

- Date: 19–27 January 1970
- Edition: 58th
- Category: Grand Slam (ITF)
- Surface: Grass
- Location: Sydney, Australia
- Venue: White City Tennis Club

Champions

Men's singles
- (United States) Arthur Ashe

Women's singles
- (Australia) Margaret Court

Men's doubles
- (United States) Bob Lutz / (United States) Stan Smith

Women's doubles
- (Australia) Margaret Court / (Australia) Judy Tegart-Dalton
- Australian Open

The 1970 Australian Open was a tennis tournament played on Grass courts at the White City Stadium in Sydney, Australia from 19 to 27 January. It was the 58th edition of the Australian Open, the 16th held in Sydney, and the first Grand Slam of the year. Margaret Smith Court's win in the singles was the first step towards her achieving a Grand Slam.

== Tournament ==
Encouraged by Rod Laver's 1969 Grand Slam, Margaret Court successfully began her own Grand Slam campaign at the White City Stadium in Sydney, winning the Australian Open title without dropping a single set. She defeated fellow Australian Kerry Melville in the final 6–1, 6–3. Although the advent of the Open Era meant tournaments were now open to all tennis players the 1970 Australian Open men's competition was depleted by the absence of the world class players Rod Laver, Ken Rosewall, Andrés Gimeno, Pancho Gonzales, Roy Emerson and Fred Stolle. All these professional players were signed to the National Tennis League and were banned from entering the Australian Open because the financial guarantees were deemed unsatisfactory. The men's draw still had its memorable matches, not least in the quarterfinal when Dennis Ralston defeated local hero John Newcombe 19–17, 20–18, 4–6, 6–3 in the longest match (in games) in Australian Open history. The men's singles final between American Arthur Ashe and Australian Dick Crealy resulted in with Ashe winning his first and only Australian Open title in straight sets 6–4, 9–7, 6–2. The result was particularly rewarding for Ashe as he had lost in the 1966 and 1967 finals. Ashe was the first non-Australian to win the title since Alex Olmedo beat Neale Fraser in 1959.

== Seniors ==
=== Men's singles ===
(United States) Arthur Ashe defeated (Australia) Dick Crealy, 6–4, 9–7, 6–2.

• It was Ashe's 2nd career Grand Slam singles title and his 1st and only title at the Australian Open.

=== Women's singles ===
(Australia) Margaret Court defeated (Australia) Kerry Melville, 6–1, 6–3.

• It was Court's 17th career Grand Slam singles title, her 4th during the Open Era and her 9th title at the Australian Open.

=== Men's doubles ===
(United States) Robert Lutz / (United States) Stan Smith defeated (Australia) John Alexander / (Australia) Phil Dent, 8–6, 6–3, 6–4.

• It was Lutz' 2nd career Grand Slam doubles title and his 1st and only title at the Australian Open.
• It was Smith's 2nd career Grand Slam doubles title and his 1st and only title at the Australian Open.

=== Women's doubles ===
(Australia) Margaret Court / (Australia) Judy Tegart-Dalton defeated (Australia) Karen Krantzcke / (Australia) Kerry Melville, 6–1, 6–3.

• It was Court's 13th career Grand Slam doubles title, her 4th during the Open Era and her 6th title at the Australian Open.
• It was Tegart-Dalton's 6th career Grand Slam doubles title, her 3rd during the Open Era and her 4th and last title at the Australian Open.

=== Mixed doubles ===
No competition between 1970 and 1986.

== Prize money ==
Event		W	F	SF	QF	3R	2R	1R
Singles	Men	A$3,400	A$2,000	A$600	A$200	A$60	A$30	–
Singles	Women	A$700	A$300	A$150	A$60	A$30	–	–

Preceded by 1969 US Open	Grand Slams	Succeeded by 1970 French Open
