= Sally Hudson-Beck =

- Country (sports): Rhodesia
- Born: 30 October 1953 (age 71) Salisbury, Rhodesia

Singles

Grand Slam singles results
- Wimbledon: 1R (1971, 1972)

Doubles

Grand Slam doubles results
- Wimbledon: 3R (1972)
- US Open: 1R (1972)

Grand Slam mixed doubles results
- Wimbledon: 1R (1972)
- US Open: 1R (1972)

Sally Hudson-Beck (born 30 October 1953) is a Zimbabwean former professional tennis player.

Hudson-Beck, born in Salisbury, began playing tennis aged nine and was coached by ex-tour player Adrian Bey. Her father was the chief pilot of Air Rhodesia. She became Rhodesia's national champion in 1971 and the following year featured in three Federation Cup ties for her country, including one against the United States. A two-time singles main draw participant at Wimbledon, Hudson-Beck toured on a South African passport due to a travel ban on Rhodesians.
