= Sally Irvine =

Australian tennis player

- Country (sports): Australia

Singles

Grand Slam singles results
- Australian Open: 2R (1972)

Doubles

Grand Slam doubles results
- Australian Open: SF (1973)

Sally Irvine is an Australian former professional tennis player.

Irvine, coached by Don Tregonning, was an Australian Open girls' doubles champion. She made the women's doubles semi-finals of the 1973 Australian Open, partnering Cynthia Doerner.
