= Janet Young (tennis) =

Australian tennis player

- Full name: Janet Anne Young (married name Langford)
- Country (sports): Australia
- Born: 22 October 1951 (age 75) Melbourne, Australia

Grand Slam singles results
- Australian Open: 3R (1970, 1974)
- French Open: 2R (1973)
- Wimbledon: 4R (1973)
- US Open: 2R (1969, 1973, 1974)

Doubles
- Career titles: 3 WTA

Grand Slam doubles results
- Australian Open: SF (1973, 1974, 1977)
- French Open: 2R (1969, 1973)
- Wimbledon: SF (1973)
- US Open: SF (1973)
Medal record
Representing Australia
Summer Universiade
Silver medal – second place	1970 Turin	Mixed doubles
Bronze medal – third place	1973 Moscow	Mixed doubles

Janet Anne Young (born 22 October 1951) is a former professional tennis player from Australia.

== Biography ==
=== Professional tennis ===
Young competed on the WTA Tour in the 1970s and won a total of three doubles titles, all of which came partnering Evonne Goolagong. The pair were finalists in eight tournaments across the 1973 season and semi-finalists at the Australian Open, Wimbledon Championships and US Open.

As a singles player, Young won the Queensland Open and South Australian Championships in 1973, both non-tour events. At the 1973 Wimbledon Championships, she won through to the fourth round, where she faced Chris Evert. She took Evert to a third set, which she lost 6–8, having led 4–0.

Young was a doubles player in Australia's winning Federation Cup teams in 1973 and 1974. Teaming with Evonne Goolagong, they remained unbeaten and only dropped one set across both campaigns.

In addition to her performances with Goolagong, Young also reached Grand Slam doubles semi-finals with Lesley Hunt (at the 1974 Australian Open) and Kym Ruddell (at the 1977 Australian Open).

=== Later career ===
Young has a doctorate in sports psychology and works as a senior lecturer in the College of Sport & Exercise Science at Melbourne's Victoria University. She served on the board of Tennis Australia from 2008 to 2016.

== WTA Tour finals ==
=== Doubles (3–5) ===
Result	W–L	Date	Tournament	Partner	Opponents	Score
Loss	0–1	Mar 1973	Fort Lauderdale, U.S.	(Australia) Evonne Goolagong	(France) Gail Sherriff Chanfreau (United Kingdom) Virginia Wade	6–4, 3–6, 2–6
Win	1–1	Mar 1973	Dallas, U.S.	(Australia) Evonne Goolagong	(France) Gail Sherriff Chanfreau (United Kingdom) Virginia Wade	6–3, 6–2
Loss	1–2	Mar 1973	Boston, U.S.	(Australia) Evonne Goolagong	(Soviet Union) Marina Kroschina (Soviet Union) Olga Morozova	2–6, 4–6
Loss	1–3	Apr 1973	St. Petersburg, U.S.	(Australia) Evonne Goolagong	(United States) Chris Evert (United States) Jeanne Evert	2–6, 6–7
Loss	1–4	May 1973	Bournemouth, Great Britain	(Australia) Evonne Goolagong	(Australia) Patricia Coleman (Australia) Wendy Turnbull	5–7, 5–7
Win	2–4	Jul 1973	Düsseldorf, West Germany	(Australia) Evonne Goolagong	(West Germany) Helga Masthoff (West Germany) Heide Orth	Shared
Loss	2–5	Aug 1973	Cincinnati, U.S.	(Australia) Evonne Goolagong	(South Africa) Ilana Kloss (South Africa) Pat Walkden	6–7, 6–3, 2–6
Win	3–5	Sep 1973	Charlotte, U.S.	(Australia) Evonne Goolagong	(South Africa) Ilana Kloss (Czechoslovakia) Martina Navratilova	6–2, 6–0

== See also ==
- List of Australia Fed Cup team representatives
