= Dorte Ekner =

Danish tennis player

- Country (sports): Denmark
- Born: 2 May 1951 (age 73)

Singles

Grand Slam singles results
- Australian Open: QF (1978)

Doubles

Grand Slam doubles results
- Australian Open: 2R (1973)

Dorte Ekner (born 2 May 1951) is a Danish former professional tennis player.

A three-time national singles champion, Ekner represented Denmark in 15 Federation Cup ties between 1973 and 1982, for wins in four singles and five doubles rubbers.

Ekner became the first Danish woman to reach the quarter-finals of a grand slam tournament during her run at the 1978 Australian Open. Competing as a main draw qualifier, Ekner defeated the sixth-seeded Cynthia Doerner and West German Heidi Eisterlehner, before falling in the quarter-finals to eventual champion Chris O'Neil.
