= Janine Whyte =

Australian tennis player

- Country (sports): Australia

Singles

Grand Slam singles results
- Australian Open: 2R (1970, 1972)
- Wimbledon: Q2 (1972)

Doubles

Grand Slam doubles results
- Australian Open: 2R (1968)

Janine Whyte is an Australian former professional tennis player.

Whyte won a girls' doubles title at the 1971 Australian Open (with Patricia Edwards). She twice played in the women's singles second round at the Australian Open, including in the 1972 tournament when she lost to Evonne Goolagong.
