= Kerry Harris =

Australian tennis player

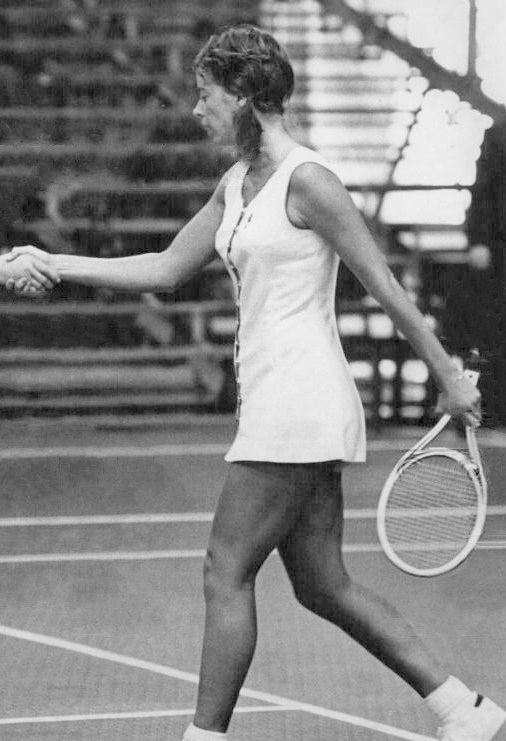
- Harris in 1969
- Country (sports): Australia
- Residence: Perth, Western Australia
- Born: 19 September 1949 (age 77) Melbourne, Australia
- Height: 5 ft 8 in (173 cm)
- Turned pro: 1968
- Retired: 1975
- Plays: Right-handed (single-handed backhand)

Singles
- Career titles: 2

Grand Slam singles results
- Australian Open: SF (1972), QF (1973), 3R (1970)
- French Open: 3R (1968)
- Wimbledon: 4R (1969, 1972) 3R (1973, 1974)
- US Open: 3R (1971)

Doubles
- Career titles: 14

Grand Slam doubles results
- Australian Open: W (1972) F (1973, 1974) SF (1970, 1971, 1975) QF (1968, 1969)
- French Open: F (1971) QF (1972)
- Wimbledon: QF (1969)
- US Open: QF (1970, 1971, 1972, 1973)

Grand Slam mixed doubles results
- US Open: QF (1971)

Kerry Harris (born 19 September 1949) is an Australian former professional tennis player, active from 1967 to 1975, who reached the semi-final of the 1972 Australian Open, and reached four Grand Slam doubles finals, of which she won one, in the 1972 Australian Open.

== Career ==
Kerry’s early years were spent under the guidance of John Hildebrand (Snr), before being coached by Harry Hopman and trained by Stan Nicholes. In 1968, the first year of the open era, she was selected to be part of the Lawn Tennis Association of Australia’s Touring Team with Harry Hopman as manager. Merv Rose was Kerry’s coach in the later years of her career.

Kerry first reached a Grand Slam final in the 1971 French Open Women's Doubles, partnering Helen Gourlay, They lost in two sets to defending champions Francoise Durr and Gail Chanfreau.

Kerry won the final of the 1972 Australian Open Women's Doubles, partnering Helen Gourlay, beating Patricia Coleman-Clegg and Karen Krantzcke. In the women’s singles, seeded number 6, she reached the semifinals, losing to eventual champion Virginia Wade in three sets.

Kerry represented Australia in the 1973 Bonne Bell Cup Team against the USA played in Sydney. When the WTA was formed in 1973 she was a Foundation Member.

She reached the women’s doubles final of the 1973 Australian Open and the 1974 Australian Open partnering Kerry Melville on both occasions. In 1973, Margaret Court and Virginia Wade won the final, and in 1974, Evonne Goolagong and Peggy Michel won.

Kerry had wins in her career over Margaret Court, Evonne Goolagong, Nancy Richey, Kerry Melville, Judy Dalton, Wendy Turnbull, Betty Stöve and Francoise Durr. She was described as an athletic player, with a very powerful serve and volley game. She was praised for her good temperament on and off the court.

After her tennis career ended, she became a tennis coach.

== Grand Slam finals ==
=== Doubles (1 title, 3 runner-ups) ===
Result	Year	Championship	Surface	Partner	Opponents	Score
Loss	1971	French Open	Clay	(Australia) Helen Gourlay	(France) Françoise Dürr (France) Gail Chanfreau	4–6, 1–6
Win	1972	Australian Open	Grass	(Australia) Helen Gourlay	(Australia) Patricia Coleman (Australia) Karen Krantzcke	6–0, 6–4
Loss	1973	Australian Open	Grass	(Australia) Kerry Melville	(Australia) Margaret Court (United Kingdom) Virginia Wade	4–6, 4–6
Loss	1974	Australian Open	Grass	(Australia) Kerry Melville	(Australia) Evonne Goolagong (United States) Peggy Michel	5–7, 3–6
