= Sue Hole =

Australian tennis player

- Country (sports): Australia

Singles

Grand Slam singles results
- Australian Open: 3R (1966)
- French Open: 1R (1967)
- Wimbledon: Q3 (1972)

Doubles

Grand Slam doubles results
- Australian Open: 2R (1970)
- French Open: 1R (1967)
- Wimbledon: 3R (1972)

Sue Hole is an Australian former professional tennis player.

Active in the 1960s and 1970s, Hole competed in overseas tournaments during her career, including the French Open and Wimbledon. She featured in the singles third round of the 1966 Australian Championships.
