= Marilyn Tesch =

Australian tennis player

- Country (sports): Australia

Singles

Grand Slam singles results
- Australian Open: 3R (1973)
- French Open: 1R (1973)

Doubles

Grand Slam doubles results
- Australian Open: QF (1970, 1972)
- Wimbledon: 2R (1973)

Grand Slam mixed doubles results
- Wimbledon: 4R (1973)
- US Open: 1R (1973)

Marilyn Tesch is an Australian former professional tennis player.

A native of Bundaberg, Queensland, Tesch was a two-time Australian Open doubles quarter-finalist. She also made the mixed doubles fourth round at Wimbledon in 1973 with Anand Amritraj, where they lost in three sets to Jimmy Connors and Chris Evert. Her best singles result at grand slam level was a third round appearance at the 1973 Australian Open.

Tesch, who is now known by her married name Rasmussen, was runner-up to Evonne Goolagong at the 1970 Australian Hard Court Championships. In 1978 she had the distinction of winning both of New Zealand's national titles.
