= Michèle Gurdal =

Belgian tennis player

- Country (sports): Belgium
- Born: 30 November 1952 (age 72)
- Turned pro: 1973
- Retired: 1985

Singles
- Career record: 24–47
- Career titles: 1

Grand Slam singles results
- Australian Open: QF (1979)
- French Open: 1R (1981)
- Wimbledon: 4R (1975)
- US Open: 1R (1975–1978)

Doubles
- Career record: 21–37

Michèle Gurdal (born 30 November 1952) is a Belgian professional tennis player who was most prominent in the 1970s. She represented Belgium in the Federation Cup every year between 1972 and 1980. Gurdal won one singles title on the WTA Tour, the 1976 Swiss Open.

== Career finals ==
=== Singles (1 title) ===
Result	W/L	Date	Tournament	Surface	Opponent	Score
Win	1–0	Jul 1976	Gstaad, Switzerland	Clay	(France) Gail Sherriff	4–6, 6–2, 6–3
