= Patricia Coleman =

Australian tennis player

- Full name: Patricia Coleman-Gregg
- Country (sports): Australia
- Born: 13 May 1953 (age 72) Tottenham, Australia

Singles

Grand Slam singles results
- Australian Open: QF (1972)
- French Open: 2R (1973)
- Wimbledon: 2R (1972, 1973)

Doubles

Grand Slam doubles results
- Australian Open: F (1971)

Patricia Coleman (born 13 May 1953) is an Australian former tennis player. She played in the Australian Open singles from 1971 to 1974. In 1972 she reached the final of the doubles event at the Australian Open with Karen Krantzcke.

== Grand Slam finals ==
=== Doubles (1 runner-up) ===
| Result | Year | Championship | Surface | Partner | Opponents | Score |
|---|---|---|---|---|---|---|
| Loss | 1972 | Australian Open | Grass | (Australia) Karen Krantzcke | (Australia) Helen Gourlay Cawley (Australia) Kerry Harris | 0–6, 4–6 |
