= 1970 French Open – Men's doubles =

Men's doubles
- 1970 French Open

Final
- Champion: (Romania) Ilie Năstase (Romania) Ion Țiriac
- Runner-up: (United States) Arthur Ashe (United States) Charlie Pasarell
- Score: 6–2, 6–4, 6–3

Details
- Draw: 72
- Seeds: 8

Events
Singles	men	women		boys	girls
Doubles	men	women	mixed	boys	girls
WC Singles	men	women	quad
WC Doubles	men	women	quad
Legends	−45	45+	women
← 1969 ·	French Open	· 1971 →

John Newcombe and Tony Roche were the defending champions but both players chose not to participate.

Ilie Năstase and Ion Țiriac won in the final 6–2, 6–4, 6–3 against Arthur Ashe and Charlie Pasarell.

== Seeds ==
1. (Romania) Ilie Năstase / (Romania) Ion Țiriac (champions)
2. (United States) Arthur Ashe / (United States) Charlie Pasarell (final)
3. (Czechoslovakia) Jan Kodeš / (Czechoslovakia) Jan Kukal (third round)
4. (United States) Jim McManus / (United States) Jim Osborne (fourth round)
5. (Australia) Dick Crealy / (Australia) Allan Stone (semifinals)
6. (Soviet Union) Sergei Likhachev / (Soviet Union) Alex Metreveli (fourth round)
7. (South Africa) Bob Hewitt / (Australia) Robert Howe (third round, retired)
8. (Australia) John Alexander / (Australia) Phil Dent (third round)

== Draw ==
=== Key ===
- Q = Qualifier
- WC = Wild card
- LL = Lucky loser
- Alt = Alternate
- ITF = ITF entry
- PR = Protected ranking
- SR = Special ranking
- SE = Special exempt
- JE = Junior exempt
- JR = Junior Accelerator Programme entrant
- CO = College Accelerator Programme entrant
- NG = Next Gen Accelerator Program entrant
- w/o = Walkover
- r = Retired
- d = Defaulted

=== Finals ===
Quarterfinals
2	(United States) Arthur Ashe (United States) Charlie Pasarell	6	4	6	6
(United Kingdom) Gerald Battrick (United Kingdom) David Lloyd	2	6	3	2
(France) Georges Goven (France) François Jauffret	2	6	7	6
(Socialist Federal Republic of Yugoslavia) Željko Franulović (Mexico) Joaquín Loyo Mayo	6	3	5	4
5	(Australia) Dick Crealy (Australia) Allan Stone	6	8	7
(Chile) Patricio Cornejo (Chile) Jaime Fillol	4	6	5
(France) Jean-Claude Barclay (France) Daniel Contet	1	8	1	4
1	(Romania) Ilie Năstase (Romania) Ion Țiriac	6	6	6	6

Semifinals
2	(United States) Arthur Ashe (United States) Charlie Pasarell	6	6	4	6
(France) Georges Goven (France) François Jauffret	4	3	6	2
5	(Australia) Dick Crealy (Australia) Allan Stone	4	7	7	3
1	(Romania) Ilie Năstase (Romania) Ion Țiriac	6	5	9	6

Final
2	(United States) Arthur Ashe (United States) Charlie Pasarell	2	4	3
1	(Romania) Ilie Năstase (Romania) Ion Țiriac	6	6	6

=== Top half ===
==== Section 1 ====
First round

Second round
2	(United States) A Ashe (United States) C Pasarell	6	6	4	6
(Hungary) P Szőke (Hungary) G Varga	4	4	6	3
(South Africa) W Freer (South Africa) F McDonald	2	2	3
(Belgium) E Drossart (Belgium) P Hombergen	6	6	6
(Australia) R Keldie (Australia) R Ruffels	w/o
(Spain) JL Arilla (Ecuador) P Guzmán
(France) P Dominguez (France) J-P Meyer	6	3	5	4
(Hungary) I Gulyás (Greece) N Kalogeropoulos	4	6	7	6

Third round
2	(United States) A Ashe (United States) C Pasarell	9	6	5	3	6
(Belgium) E Drossart (Belgium) P Hombergen	7	4	7	6	3
(Australia) R Keldie (Australia) R Ruffels	6	7	3	1	7
(Hungary) I Gulyás (Greece) N Kalogeropoulos	3	5	6	6	5

Fourth round
2	(United States) A Ashe (United States) C Pasarell	6	6	6
(Australia) R Keldie (Australia) R Ruffels	1	2	2

==== Section 2 ====
First round

Second round
7	(South Africa) B Hewitt (Australia) B Howe	6	6	6
(United States) N Perry (Ecuador) E Zuleta	0	3	1
(West Germany) I Buding (West Germany) H-J Plötz	6	6	6
(France) G Deniau (France) J-P Loth	4	2	4
(France) J-B Chanfreau (France) J-L Rouyer	4	2	8	4
(Poland) W Gąsiorek (Socialist Federal Republic of Yugoslavia) N Špear	6	6	6	6
(United Kingdom) G Battrick (United Kingdom) D Lloyd	14	4	6	6
(Italy) P Marzano (Italy) A Panatta	12	6	1	2

Third round
7	(South Africa) B Hewitt (Australia) B Howe	2	2	7^{r}
(West Germany) I Buding (West Germany) H-J Plötz	6	6	7
(Poland) W Gąsiorek (Socialist Federal Republic of Yugoslavia) N Špear	4	2	5
(United Kingdom) G Battrick (United Kingdom) D Lloyd	6	6	7

Fourth round
(West Germany) I Buding (West Germany) H-J Plötz	6	6	4	4
(United Kingdom) G Battrick (United Kingdom) D Lloyd	8	4	6	6

==== Section 3 ====
First round

Second round
3	(Czechoslovakia) J Kodeš (Czechoslovakia) J Kukal	w/o
(Australia) R Howes (Australia) B Rheinberger
(Australia) T Addison (Australia) B Carmichael	6	6	6
(Bolivia) E Gorostiaga (United States) F Ponte	1	3	1
(France) G Goven (France) F Jauffret	w/o
(United States) D Bohrnstedt (United States) R Fisher
(South Africa) K Diepraam (South Africa) R Krog	6	4	1	3
(United States) D O'Bryant (Australia) B Phillips-Moore	4	6	6	6

Third round
3	(Czechoslovakia) J Kodeš (Czechoslovakia) J Kukal	14	8	2
(Australia) T Addison (Australia) B Carmichael	16	10	6
(France) G Goven (France) F Jauffret	6	7	6
(United States) D O'Bryant (Australia) B Phillips-Moore	2	5	3

Fourth round
(Australia) T Addison (Australia) B Carmichael	1	8	9	4	4
(France) G Goven (France) F Jauffret	6	6	7	6	6

==== Section 4 ====
First round
(Socialist Federal Republic of Yugoslavia) Ž Franulović (Mexico) J Loyo Mayo	8	3	6	6	6
(Australia) C Dibley (Australia) P Doerner	10	6	2	4	1
(United States) R Barth (United States) T Gorman	w/o
(France) C Duxin (France) J-N Grinda
(Rhodesia) A Pattison (South Africa) T Ryan	1	6	6	6
(Indonesia) S Sugiarto (Indonesia) A Wijono	6	2	1	2
(France) J Lovera (France) J Thamin	4	4	4
(Italy) F Bartoni (Italy) E Castigliano	6	6	6

Second round
6	(Soviet Union) S Likhachev (Soviet Union) A Metreveli	7	6	6
(Morocco) L Chadli (Morocco) A Laroussi	5	1	1
(France) J-P Courcol (France) B Paul	3	6	2	6	6
(Hungary) S Baranyi (Hungary) R Machán	6	4	6	2	4
(Socialist Federal Republic of Yugoslavia) Ž Franulović (Mexico) J Loyo Mayo	6	1	8	9
(United States) R Barth (United States) T Gorman	3	6	6	7
(Rhodesia) A Pattison (South Africa) T Ryan	6	6	6	6
(Italy) F Bartoni (Italy) E Castigliano	2	0	8	3

Third round
6	(Soviet Union) S Likhachev (Soviet Union) A Metreveli	6	6	6
(France) J-P Courcol (France) B Paul	4	1	4
(Socialist Federal Republic of Yugoslavia) Ž Franulović (Mexico) J Loyo Mayo	1	6	6	7
(Rhodesia) A Pattison (South Africa) T Ryan	6	3	2	5

Fourth round
6	(Soviet Union) S Likhachev (Soviet Union) A Metreveli	4	3	3
(Socialist Federal Republic of Yugoslavia) Ž Franulović (Mexico) J Loyo Mayo	6	6	6

=== Bottom half ===
==== Section 5 ====
First round
(Socialist Federal Republic of Yugoslavia) B Jovanović (New Zealand) O Parun
(Australia) J Bartlett (Australia) G Masters	w/o
(Italy) V Franchitti (Italy) R Lombardi	5	2	7	4
(France) P Beust (France) W N'Godrella	7	6	5	6
(Colombia) W Álvarez (Brazil) JE Mandarino	7	6	5	6
(France) F Battegay (France) P Joly	5	1	7	1
(Jamaica) L Lumsden (Jamaica) R Russell	6	6	6	6
(United States) B MacKay (United States) C Richey	3	4	8	3

Second round
(Australia) J Bartlett (Australia) G Masters	6	6	6
(France) P Beust (France) W N'Godrella	1	4	3
(Colombia) W Álvarez (Brazil) JE Mandarino	6	6	4	6
(Jamaica) L Lumsden (Jamaica) R Russell	2	4	6	1
(Venezuela) A Plaza (United States) R Trappenberg	w/o
(Czechoslovakia) F Pála (Czechoslovakia) V Zedník
(Poland) T Nowicki (Poland) M Rybarczyk	10	3	0
5	(Australia) D Crealy (Australia) A Stone	12	6	6

Third round
(Australia) J Bartlett (Australia) G Masters	6	6	6
(Colombia) W Álvarez (Brazil) JE Mandarino	3	4	3
(Venezuela) A Plaza (United States) R Trappenberg	2	2	0
5	(Australia) D Crealy (Australia) A Stone	6	6	6

Fourth round
(Australia) J Bartlett (Australia) G Masters	4	5	5
5	(Australia) D Crealy (Australia) A Stone	6	7	7

==== Section 6 ====
First round

Second round
(West Germany) J Fassbender (West Germany) H-J Pohmann	5	1	3
(Chile) P Cornejo (Chile) J Fillol	7	6	6
(France) D Charlet (France) É Loliée	1	4	2
(Australia) L Hoad (South Africa) A Segal	6	6	6
(Italy) M Di Domenico (Italy) E Di Matteo	7	3	5	9	4
(France) A Bouteleux (France) M Leclercq	5	6	7	7	6
(Czechoslovakia) Š Koudelka (Australia) A McDonald
4	(United States) J McManus (United States) J Osborne	w/o

Third round
(Chile) P Cornejo (Chile) J Fillol	6	7	7
(Australia) L Hoad (South Africa) A Segal	3	5	5
(France) A Bouteleux (France) M Leclercq	4	3	5
4	(United States) J McManus (United States) J Osborne	6	6	7

Fourth round
(Chile) P Cornejo (Chile) J Fillol	6	6	6
4	(United States) J McManus (United States) J Osborne	4	2	3

==== Section 7 ====
First round

Second round
(United Kingdom) J Barrett (United Kingdom) S Matthews	5	4	2
(Spain) A Muñoz (Spain) M Orantes	7	6	6
(Soviet Union) T Kakulia (Soviet Union) A Volkov	5	3	2
(France) J-C Barclay (France) D Contet	7	6	6
(Australia) I Fletcher (Romania) P Mărmureanu	6	6	6
(France) P Darmon (United States) D Dell	3	2	3
(United States) B Seewagen (United States) C Steele
8	(Australia) J Alexander (Australia) P Dent	w/o

Third round
(Spain) A Muñoz (Spain) M Orantes	2	2	4
(France) J-C Barclay (France) D Contet	6	6	6
(Australia) I Fletcher (Romania) P Mărmureanu	7	9	5	6
8	(Australia) J Alexander (Australia) P Dent	5	7	7	2

Fourth round
(France) J-C Barclay (France) D Contet	10	6	3	6
(Australia) I Fletcher (Romania) P Mărmureanu	8	3	6	4

==== Section 8 ====
First round

Second round
(Australia) K Coombes (Australia) K Fletcher
(France) B Montrenaud (France) P Proisy	w/o
(South Africa) J Krinsky (South Africa) D Schroder
(Italy) M Mulligan (Italy) N Pietrangeli	w/o
(Japan) J Kuki (Japan) I Watanabe	2	4	7	4
(Chile) JR Pinto Bravo (Chile) P Rodríguez	6	6	5	6
(Australia) R Case (Australia) A Gardiner
1	(Romania) I Năstase (Romania) I Țiriac	w/o

Third round
(France) B Montrenaud (France) P Proisy	5	3	6	6	3
(Italy) M Mulligan (Italy) N Pietrangeli	7	6	2	4	6
(Chile) JR Pinto Bravo (Chile) P Rodríguez	3	1	6	5
1	(Romania) I Năstase (Romania) I Țiriac	6	6	0	7

Fourth round
(Italy) M Mulligan (Italy) N Pietrangeli	2	4	6
1	(Romania) I Năstase (Romania) I Țiriac	6	6	8
