= 1969 French Open – Men's singles qualifying =

Men's singles qualifying
- 1969 French Open

Events
Singles	men	women		boys	girls
Doubles	men	women	mixed	boys	girls
WC Singles	men	women	quad
WC Doubles	men	women	quad
Legends	−45	45+	women
← 1968 ·	French Open	· 1970 →

Players who neither had high enough rankings nor received wild cards to enter the main draw of the annual French Open Tennis Championships participated in a qualifying tournament held in the week before the event.

== Qualifiers ==
1. (West Germany) Jürgen Fassbender
2. (Italy) Sergio Palmieri
3. (Australia) John Bartlett
4. (Australia) Geoff Masters
5. (Poland) Andrzej Licis
6. (Italy) Piero Toci
7. (United Kingdom) John Barrett
8. (United States) Zan Guerry
9. (United States) Mike Estep
10. (Italy) Massimo Di Domenico
11. (France) Patrick Proisy
12. (Italy) Adriano Panatta
13. (United States) Tom Gorman
14. (United Kingdom) Stanley Matthews
15. (France) François Pierson
16. (France) Bernard Detroye

== Qualifying draw ==
=== Key ===
- Q = Qualifier
- WC = Wild card
- LL = Lucky loser
- Alt = Alternate
- ITF = ITF entry
- PR = Protected ranking
- SR = Special ranking
- SE = Special exempt
- JE = Junior exempt
- JR = Junior Accelerator Programme entrant
- CO = College Accelerator Programme entrant
- NG = Next Gen Accelerator Program entrant
- w/o = Walkover
- r = Retired
- d = Defaulted

=== First qualifier ===
First round

Second round
(West Germany) Jürgen Fassbender	8	5	6	6
(France) Pierre Loizeau	6	7	4	4
(Australia) Max Senior	6	6	6	3	1
(France) Jean-Pierre Olivier	1	8	4	6	6

Qualifying competition
(West Germany) Jürgen Fassbender	4	6	8	7	6
(France) Jean-Pierre Olivier	6	1	10	5	2

=== Second qualifier ===
First round
1	(Italy) Sergio Palmieri	6	9	6
8	(France) Michel Bergès	1	7	3
4	(United States) Dick Dell	6	6	6
5	(France) Paul Desq	1	2	3
3	(Canada) J. Cates	0	0	1
6	(France) Gérard Pilet	6	6	6

Second round
(Italy) Sergio Palmieri	1	6	1	6	6
(United States) Dick Dell	6	4	6	4	1
(France) Jean-Paul Meyer	6	6	5	6
(France) Gérard Pilet	2	2	7	4

Qualifying competition
(Italy) Sergio Palmieri	5	6	6	6
(France) Jean-Paul Meyer	7	1	3	4

=== Third qualifier ===
First round
1	(Australia) John Bartlett	6	6	4	9
8	(France) Jacques Thamin	3	2	6	7
2	(Australia) Peter Doerner	6	6	6
7	(Brazil) Luis-Felipe Tavares	4	0	4
3	(Belgium) Eric Sheridan	4	1	4
6	(France) François Matheu	6	6	6

Second round
(Australia) John Bartlett	6	6	6	6
(Morocco) Mohammed-Haibabi Bouchaib	3	2	8	2
(Australia) Peter Doerner	5	6	3	5
(France) François Matheu	7	3	6	7

Qualifying competition
(Australia) John Bartlett	6	6	7
(France) François Matheu	3	1	5

=== Fourth qualifier ===
First round
1	(Italy) Luigi Pirro	7	0	3
8	(France) Patrice Dominguez	9	6	6
2	(Australia) Eugene McCabe	9	1	5
7	(France) Thierry Bernasconi	11	6	7
3	(Australia) Geoff Masters	6	6	6
6	(Uruguay) Eduardo Argon	1	0	3

Second round
(France) Patrice Dominguez	7	6	6
(France) Bernard Boutboul	5	4	4
(France) Thierry Bernasconi	1	6	4	1
(Australia) Geoff Masters	6	3	6	6

Qualifying competition
(France) Patrice Dominguez	2	3	1
(Australia) Geoff Masters	6	6	6

=== Fifth qualifier ===
First round
1	(Iran) Shirzad Akbari	0	3	1
8	(France) Christian Duxin	6	6	6
2	(Finland) Sten Stahle	0	2	3
7	(Poland) Andrzej Licis	6	6	6

Second round
(France) Christian Duxin	6	6	6
(France) Sampiero Gavini	3	4	3
(Poland) Andrzej Licis	8	6	6
(France) Patrice Duhamel	6	1	2

Qualifying competition
(France) Christian Duxin	6	5	6	5	0
(Poland) Andrzej Licis	4	7	1	7	6

=== Sixth qualifier ===
First round

Second round
(Italy) Piero Toci	7	2	6	6
(France) Philippe Fremoit	5	6	4	1
(Australia) Anthony Hammond	6	8	1	6	2
(France) Pierre Joly	8	6	6	4	6

Qualifying competition
(Italy) Piero Toci	4	6	8	6
(France) Pierre Joly	6	4	6	2

=== Seventh qualifier ===
First round
1	(Japan) Junzo Kawamori	6	6	3	6
8	(France) Henri Pellizza	3	4	6	2

Second round
(Japan) Junzo Kawamori	6	6	3	4	2
(France) François Battegay	2	4	6	6	6
(United Kingdom) John Barrett
(France) Jean-Claude Fauvet	w/o

Qualifying competition
(France) François Battegay	3	1	1
(United Kingdom) John Barrett	6	6	6

=== Eighth qualifier ===
First round
1	(Italy) Franco Bartoni	6	3	6	6
8	(France) Éric Loliée	1	6	1	3

Second round
(Italy) Franco Bartoni	1	6	7	4	4
(United States) Zan Guerry	6	4	5	6	6
(Australia) Syd Ball	6	1	2	7	6
(Belgium) Christian Janssens	1	6	6	5	3

Qualifying competition
(United States) Zan Guerry	6	3	10	8
(Australia) Syd Ball	2	6	8	6

=== Ninth qualifier ===
First round
1	(Australia) Gavin Hogben	6	6	8
8	(France) Bertrand Dufour	1	1	6
4	(United States) Mike Estep	6	6	6
5	(France) Patrick Béraud	1	0	1

Second round
(Australia) Gavin Hogben	1	9	9	2
(United States) Mike Estep	6	7	11	6
(Iran) Issa Khodaei	2	2	3
(France) Jean-Baptiste Chanfreau	6	6	6

Qualifying competition
(United States) Mike Estep	4	5
(France) Jean-Baptiste Chanfreau	6	2^{r}

=== Tenth qualifier ===
First round
1	(Bolivia) Eduardo Gorostiaga	6	6	6
8	(France) Paul Jalabert	1	2	1

Second round
(Bolivia) Eduardo Gorostiaga	5	4	6	6	2
(France) Alain Bresson	7	6	4	3	6
(Italy) Massimo Di Domenico	6	6	7
(Mexico) Jorge Ramirez	3	1	5

Qualifying competition
(France) Alain Bresson	4	3	1
(Italy) Massimo Di Domenico	6	6	6

=== Eleventh qualifier ===
First round
2	(Soviet Union) Erwin Lange	3	6	3	7	6
7	(France) Jean-Louis Thiebaut	6	2	6	5	3
3	(Argentina) Raúl Peralta	4	3	4
6	(France) Patrick Proisy	6	6	6

Second round
(France) Wanaro N'Godrella	6	6	6
(France) Jean-Noël Grinda	2	1	3
(Soviet Union) Erwin Lange	3	2	3
(France) Patrick Proisy	6	6	6

Qualifying competition
(France) Wanaro N'Godrella	5	6	6	1
(France) Patrick Proisy	7	4	8	6

=== Twelfth qualifier ===
First round
1	(Australia) John Gardner	5	7	7	6
8	(France) Jean Mazzella	7	5	5	1
4	(Italy) Adriano Panatta	6	3	6	6
5	(France) Didier Charlet	3	6	1	2
2	(Spain) Antonio Muñoz	0	6	6	6
7	(France) Alain Benoît-Levy	6	2	2	3

Second round
(Australia) John Gardner	7	8	4
(Italy) Adriano Panatta	9	10	6
(Spain) Antonio Muñoz	4	6	6	6
(France) Georges Deniau	6	3	0	1

Qualifying competition
(Italy) Adriano Panatta	6	6	4	2	6
(Spain) Antonio Muñoz	3	4	6	6	4

=== Thirteenth qualifier ===
First round
4	(United Kingdom) John Clifton	6	4	0	6
5	(France) Yves Christiaen	3	6	6	8

Second round
(United States) Tom Gorman
(France) Yves Christiaen	w/o
(Australia) Alvin Gardiner	9	6	6
(France) Marc Isambert	7	1	3

Qualifying competition
(United States) Tom Gorman	6	6	4	6
(Australia) Alvin Gardiner	2	2	6	4

=== Fourteenth qualifier ===
First round
1	(Australia) -. Ross	6	6	1	4	3
8	(France) Daniel Moreau	2	3	6	6	6
2	(United Kingdom) Stanley Matthews	6	6	6
7	(France) Jean-Louis Auget	1	4	1
3	(Japan) Keishiro Yanagi	10	8	6
6	(France) Alain Cassaigne	8	6	1

Second round
(France) Daniel Moreau	6	6	6
(Belgium) Robert Goethals	3	2	2
(United Kingdom) Stanley Matthews	6	8	3	6
(Japan) Keishiro Yanagi	2	6	6	0

Qualifying competition
(France) Daniel Moreau	3	4	5
(United Kingdom) Stanley Matthews	6	6	7

=== Fifteenth qualifier ===
First round

Second round
(France) François Pierson	6	6	13
(France) Éric Derasse	1	4	11
(France) Alain Bouteleux	6	5	6	6
(South Africa) Mel Baleson	3	7	3	4

Qualifying competition
(France) François Pierson	0	2	6	6	6
(France) Alain Bouteleux	6	6	2	3	3

=== Sixteenth qualifier ===
First round

Second round
(France) Bernard Detroye
(France) Jean-Pierre Bombardier	w/o
(Iran) Reza Akbari
(France) Marc Boulle	w/o

Qualifying competition
(France) Bernard Detroye	2	6	6	6
(Iran) Reza Akbari	6	4	2	2
