= 1969 Wimbledon Championships – Men's singles qualifying =

Men's singles qualifying
- 1969 Wimbledon Championships

Events
Singles	men	women		boys	girls
Doubles	men	women	mixed	boys	girls
WC Singles	men	women	quad
WC Doubles	men	women	quad
Legends	men	women	seniors

Qualification
Singles	men	women
Doubles	men	women	mixed
- Wimbledon Championships

Players who neither had high enough rankings nor received wild cards to enter the main draw of the annual Wimbledon Tennis Championships participated in a qualifying tournament held one week before the event. Several players withdrew from the main draw after qualifying had commenced, leading to the highest ranked players who lost in the final qualifying round to be entered into the main draw as lucky losers.

== Qualifiers ==
1. (Australia) Allan McDonald
2. (South Africa) Rayno Seegers
3. (United Kingdom) John Paish
4. (United States) William Higgins
5. (United States) Erik van Dillen
6. (United Kingdom) John Clifton
7. (Australia) John Bartlett
8. (Czechoslovakia) Štěpán Koudelka
9. (United States) Chauncey Steele
10. (South Africa) Julian Krinsky

== Lucky losers ==
1. (Australia) Barry Geraghty
2. (Austria) Peter Pokorny
3. (Ecuador) Eduardo Zuleta
4. (Poland) Tadeusz Nowicki
5. (Japan) Keishiro Yanagi

== Qualifying draw ==
Key

- Q = Qualifier
- WC = Wild card
- LL = Lucky loser
- Alt = Alternate
- ITF = ITF entry
- PR = Protected ranking
- SR = Special ranking
- SE = Special exempt
- JE = Junior exempt
- JR = Junior Accelerator Programme entrant
- CO = College Accelerator Programme entrant
- NG = Next Gen Accelerator Program entrant
- w/o = Walkover
- r = Retired
- d = Defaulted

=== First qualifier ===
First round
1	(United States) Tom Mozur	6	4	6	8
8	(Pakistan) Munawar Iqbal	4	6	3	6
4	(South Africa) Mel Baleson	5	7	6	6
5	(Australia) Jim Moore	7	5	3	4
2	(Australia) Allan McDonald	6	6	6
7	(Finland) George Berner	3	0	3
3	(Australia) Peter Avery	4	6	6	7
6	(United Kingdom) John De Mendoza	6	4	2	5

Second round
(United States) Tom Mozur	3	6	5	6	6
(South Africa) Mel Baleson	6	4	7	3	3
(Australia) Allan McDonald	6	6	6
(Australia) Peter Avery	3	4	1

Qualifying competition
(United States) Tom Mozur	3	2	3
(Australia) Allan McDonald	6	6	6

=== Second qualifier ===
First round
1	(Poland) Tadeusz Nowicki	8	6	6
8	(Australia) Ian Fletcher	6	4	4
4	(France) Patrick Proisy	6	6	6
5	(Netherlands) Jan Hordijk	3	2	2
2	(South Africa) Rayno Seegers	6	6	6
7	(New Zealand) Jeff Simpson	2	3	2
3	(Australia) Alvin Gardiner	6	8	4	6
6	(United Kingdom) Geoffrey Bluett	3	6	6	1

Second round
(Poland) Tadeusz Nowicki	6	6	3	2	6
(France) Patrick Proisy	3	2	6	6	3
(South Africa) Rayno Seegers	6	6	6
(Australia) Alvin Gardiner	4	4	4

Qualifying competition
(Poland) Tadeusz Nowicki	2	3	4
(South Africa) Rayno Seegers	6	6	6

=== Third qualifier ===
First round
1	(Canada) Donald McCormick	7	6	6	6
8	(United States) Thomas Karp	9	2	1	4
4	(Bolivia) Eduardo Gorostiaga	3	6	6	4	6
5	(Norway) Frithjof Prydz	6	2	3	6	1
2	(Australia) Anthony Hammond	1	7	6	6
7	(Italy) Franco Bartoni	6	5	1	0
3	(United Kingdom) John Paish	6	6	8
6	(Japan) Osamu Ishiguro	2	4	6

Second round
(Canada) Donald McCormick	6	5	6	7
(Bolivia) Eduardo Gorostiaga	4	7	1	5
(Australia) Anthony Hammond	6	3	6	4
(United Kingdom) John Paish	8	6	4	6

Qualifying competition
(Canada) Donald McCormick	5	2	2
(United Kingdom) John Paish	7	6	6

=== Fourth qualifier ===
First round
1	(United States) William Higgins	5	2	6	6	8
8	(United States) George Taylor	7	6	1	1	6
4	(Australia) Peter Doerner	4	6	7	6
5	(Poland) Mieczysław Rybarczyk	6	4	5	1
2	(Japan) Keishiro Yanagi	6	4	6	6
7	(France) Bernard Montrenaud	0	6	3	3
3	(United States) Donald Lutz	6	6	3	12	6
6	(Socialist Federal Republic of Yugoslavia) Zlatko Ivančić	3	8	6	10	3

Second round
(United States) William Higgins	6	3	6	6
(Australia) Peter Doerner	2	6	1	3
(Japan) Keishiro Yanagi	6	2	6	4	7
(United States) Donald Lutz	2	6	2	6	5

Qualifying competition
(United States) William Higgins	6	9	1	6	6
(Japan) Keishiro Yanagi	1	11	6	2	2

=== Fifth qualifier ===
First round
1	(South Africa) Derek Schroder	6	4	6	6
8	(Canada) Tony Bardsley	4	6	4	2
4	(India) Jasjit Singh	6	6	6
5	(Colombia) Iván Molina	4	4	3
2	(United States) Erik van Dillen	6	6	6
7	(Australia) Syd Ball	1	2	2
3	(Argentina) Raúl Peralta	6	4	6	6
6	(Switzerland) Matthias Werren	3	6	3	2

Second round
(South Africa) Derek Schroder	6	6	6
(India) Jasjit Singh	2	3	4
(United States) Erik van Dillen	6	6	6
(Argentina) Raúl Peralta	2	3	2

Qualifying competition
(South Africa) Derek Schroder	7	3	3	3
(United States) Erik van Dillen	5	6	6	6

=== Sixth qualifier ===
First round
1	(United Kingdom) John Clifton	6	7	6
8	(Rhodesia) Hank Irvine	3	5	3
4	(Australia) Max Senior	6	4	1	7	6
5	(South Africa) Dennis Matthews	2	6	6	5	2
2	(Austria) Peter Pokorny	8	6	1	7
7	(South Africa) Rauty Krog	6	3	6	5
3	(United States) Dick Dell	1	7	11	4	6
6	(Japan) Junzo Kawamori	6	5	9	6	3

Second round
(United Kingdom) John Clifton	6	6	6
(Australia) Max Senior	2	3	1
(Austria) Peter Pokorny	8	6	6
(United States) Dick Dell	6	3	3

Qualifying competition
(United Kingdom) John Clifton	6	6	6
(Austria) Peter Pokorny	3	4	3

=== Seventh qualifier ===
First round
1	(Australia) John Bartlett	6	6	6
8	(Jamaica) Lance Lumsden	3	4	2
4	(Sweden) Hans Nerell	6	6	2	3
5	(United Kingdom) Lindsay Murphy	2	4	6	0^{r}
2	(Australia) Geoff Masters	6	6	6	6
7	(South Africa) Byron Bertram	3	2	8	4
3	(New Zealand) Richard Hawkes	6	9	2	3
6	(United Kingdom) Clay Iles	4	7	6	0^{r}

Second round
(Australia) John Bartlett	6	6	6
(Sweden) Hans Nerell	4	3	1
(Australia) Geoff Masters
(New Zealand) Richard Hawkes	w/o

Qualifying competition
(Australia) John Bartlett	6	6	7
(Australia) Geoff Masters	3	3	5

=== Eighth qualifier ===
First round
1	(Czechoslovakia) Štěpán Koudelka	6	6	5	6
8	(Italy) Adriano Panatta	0	4	7	4
4	(France) Bernard Paul	6	6	6
5	(United States) William Tym	4	2	4
2	(Australia) Barry Geraghty	6	6	5	4	13
7	(Italy) Massimo Di Domenico	4	4	7	6	11
3	(Sweden) Martin Carlstein	6	6	7	6	6
6	(France) Jean-Baptiste Chanfreau	4	3	9	8	3

Second round
(Czechoslovakia) Štěpán Koudelka	6	8	6
(France) Bernard Paul	2	6	4
(Australia) Barry Geraghty	4	12	6	11
(Sweden) Martin Carlstein	6	10	4	9

Qualifying competition
(Czechoslovakia) Štěpán Koudelka	6	6	7
(Australia) Barry Geraghty	3	3	5

=== Ninth qualifier ===
First round
1	(United States) Chauncey Steele	6	6	6
8	(Greece) Periclis Gavrilidis	0	0	4
4	(Australia) John Gardner	6	6	10
5	(France) Pierre Loizeau	1	4	8
2	(Ecuador) Eduardo Zuleta	3	7	4	6	6
7	(Argentina) Roberto Aubone	6	5	6	1	3
3	(United Kingdom) Colin McHugo	6	6	3	7	6
6	(France) Wanaro N'Godrella	4	4	6	9	4

Second round
(United States) Chauncey Steele	6	6	2	6
(Australia) John Gardner	3	2	6	4
(Ecuador) Eduardo Zuleta	7	6	1	6
(United Kingdom) Colin McHugo	5	4	6	2

Qualifying competition
(United States) Chauncey Steele	7	6	6
(Ecuador) Eduardo Zuleta	5	1	2

=== Tenth qualifier ===
First round
1	(Canada) Robert Puddicombe	6	6	5	6
8	(France) Jacques Thamin	2	2	7	2
4	(United Kingdom) Simon Partridge	8	6	6
5	(Australia) Graham Primrose	6	4	3
2	(Argentina) Lito Álvarez	7	4	3
7	(South Africa) Julian Krinsky	9	6	6
3	(South Africa) Frank McDonald	2	1	6	9	6
6	(Chile) Jaime Rene Pinto Bravo	6	6	3	7	3

Second round
(Canada) Robert Puddicombe	6	11	6
(United Kingdom) Simon Partridge	3	9	4
(South Africa) Julian Krinsky	6	6	6
(South Africa) Frank McDonald	2	2	4

Qualifying competition
(Canada) Robert Puddicombe	6	6	7	1
(South Africa) Julian Krinsky	3	8	9	6
