= 1970 Wimbledon Championships – Men's singles qualifying =

Men's singles qualifying
- 1970 Wimbledon Championships

Events
Singles	men	women		boys	girls
Doubles	men	women	mixed	boys	girls
WC Singles	men	women	quad
WC Doubles	men	women	quad
Legends	men	women	seniors

Qualification
Singles	men	women
Doubles	men	women	mixed
- Wimbledon Championships

Players who neither had high enough rankings nor received wild cards to enter the main draw of the annual Wimbledon Tennis Championships participated in a qualifying tournament held one week before the event. One players withdrew from the main draw after qualifying had commenced, leading to the highest ranked players who lost in the final qualifying round, Eduardo Zuleta, to be entered into the main draw as a lucky loser.

== Qualifiers ==
1. (United Kingdom) Stephen Warboys
2. (South Africa) Rauty Krog
3. (United Kingdom) John Paish
4. (Australia) Peter Doerner
5. (Australia) Colin Dibley
6. (Zimbabwe) Roger Dowdeswell
7. (United Kingdom) Peter Curtis
8. (Australia) John Bartlett
9. (Australia) Syd Ball
10. (Australia) Allan McDonald

== Lucky losers ==
1. (Ecuador) Eduardo Zuleta

== Qualifying draw ==
Key

- Q = Qualifier
- WC = Wild card
- LL = Lucky loser
- Alt = Alternate
- ITF = ITF entry
- PR = Protected ranking
- SR = Special ranking
- SE = Special exempt
- JE = Junior exempt
- JR = Junior Accelerator Programme entrant
- CO = College Accelerator Programme entrant
- NG = Next Gen Accelerator Program entrant
- w/o = Walkover
- r = Retired
- d = Defaulted

=== First qualifier ===
First round
1	(Australia) Alvin Gardiner	15	6	6
8	(United Kingdom) Paul Hutchins	13	2	4
4	(New Zealand) Richard Hawkes	8	6	4	5	6
5	(France) Patrice Dominguez	6	2	6	7	0
2	(United Kingdom) Stephen Warboys	10	9	7	6
7	(Netherlands) Pieter Soeters	12	7	5	4
3	(Venezuela) Humphrey Hose	6	6	6
6	(South Africa) Rayno Seegers	4	2	4

Second round
(Australia) Alvin Gardiner	5	6	6	6
(New Zealand) Richard Hawkes	7	4	2	4
(United Kingdom) Stephen Warboys	6	6	6
(Venezuela) Humphrey Hose	4	2	4

Qualifying competition
(Australia) Alvin Gardiner	15	1	6	6	3
(United Kingdom) Stephen Warboys	17	6	4	4	6

=== Second qualifier ===
First round
1	(Italy) Massimo Di Domenico	6	4	4	6	6
8	(Pakistan) Munawar Iqbal	4	6	6	4	4
4	(South Africa) Rauty Krog	6	7	6
5	(United Kingdom) John Barrett	3	5	3
2	(United Kingdom) Mike Collins	2	2	3
7	(Poland) Tadeusz Nowicki	6	6	6
3	(Australia) Geoff Masters	6	5	6	6
6	(United States) Felix Ponte	4	7	3	2

Second round
(Italy) Massimo Di Domenico	4	1	5
(South Africa) Rauty Krog	6	6	7
(Poland) Tadeusz Nowicki	11	12	6
(Australia) Geoff Masters	9	10	4

Qualifying competition
(South Africa) Rauty Krog	6	7	4	6
(Poland) Tadeusz Nowicki	1	5	6	4

=== Third qualifier ===
First round
1	(Japan) Jun Kuki	6	3	2	6	6
8	(South Africa) Lewis Sylvester	4	6	6	2	1
4	(United Kingdom) John Paish	6	2	8	6
5	(Italy) Ezio Di Matteo	1	6	6	2
2	(France) Thierry Bernasconi	6	6	8
7	(Australia) Anthony Hammond	1	3	6
3	(United States) Ken Stuart	7	6	4	6	6
6	(United Kingdom) Graeme Notman	5	1	6	8	2

Second round
(Japan) Jun Kuki	1	2	4
(United Kingdom) John Paish	6	6	6
(France) Thierry Bernasconi	8	4	4	7	4
(United States) Ken Stuart	6	6	6	5	6

Qualifying competition
(United Kingdom) John Paish	6	6	2	6
(United States) Ken Stuart	4	1	6	1

=== Fourth qualifier ===
First round
1	(Australia) Peter Doerner	6	6	6
8	(Bolivia) Eduardo Gorostiaga	3	1	2
4	(Australia) Jim Moore	9	6	6
5	(Australia) Ian Bidmeade	7	3	4
2	(South Africa) William Freer	6	7	2	6
7	(Australia) Lindsay Straney	4	5	6	4
3	(France) Wanaro N'Godrella	4	8	6	6
6	(United Kingdom) Colin McHugo	6	6	3	4

Second round
(Australia) Peter Doerner	6	7	6
(Australia) Jim Moore	3	5	4
(South Africa) William Freer	9	3	4	11	4
(France) Wanaro N'Godrella	7	6	6	9	6

Qualifying competition
(Australia) Peter Doerner	9	6	7
(France) Wanaro N'Godrella	7	4	5

=== Fifth qualifier ===
First round
1	(Socialist Federal Republic of Yugoslavia) Zlatko Ivančić	5	6	9	12	6
8	(Australia) Karl Coombes	7	4	7	14	3
4	(South Africa) Abe Segal	6	7	6
5	(New Zealand) Jeff Simpson	4	5	3
2	(Australia) Colin Dibley	6	6	4	6
7	(Venezuela) Jorge Andrew	4	1	6	1
3	(Italy) Franco Bartoni	6	6	6
6	(Australia) William Joiner	4	4	0

Second round
(Socialist Federal Republic of Yugoslavia) Zlatko Ivančić	4	2	4
(South Africa) Abe Segal	6	6	6
(Australia) Colin Dibley	6	6	6
(Italy) Franco Bartoni	4	1	4

Qualifying competition
(South Africa) Abe Segal	7	6	3	7
(Australia) Colin Dibley	9	3	6	9

=== Sixth qualifier ===
First round
1	(Indonesia) Sutarjo Sugiarto	6	2	6	6	6
8	(United Kingdom) Geoffrey Bluett	8	6	2	3	0
4	(United States) Dick R. Bohrnstedt	6	6	6
5	(Italy) Pietro Marzano	3	3	2
2	(Australia) Greg Perkins	3	6	2	6	6
7	(West Germany) Hans-Jürgen Pohmann	6	0	6	3	2
3	(Zimbabwe) Roger Dowdeswell	6	6	6
6	(Portugal) Raúl Peralta	4	2	2

Second round
(Indonesia) Sutarjo Sugiarto	1	2	2
(United States) Dick R. Bohrnstedt	6	6	6
(Australia) Greg Perkins	6	7	3	3
(Zimbabwe) Roger Dowdeswell	0	9	6	6

Qualifying competition
(United States) Dick R. Bohrnstedt	6	3	5	4
(Zimbabwe) Roger Dowdeswell	2	6	7	6

=== Seventh qualifier ===
First round
1	(Australia) Ross Case	2	6	6	6
8	(Poland) Wiesław Gąsiorek	6	3	2	4
4	(United States) Dan O'Bryant	6	6	6
5	(France) Jean Lovera	4	4	4
2	(United Kingdom) Peter Curtis	8	6	6
7	(Czechoslovakia) Jiří Hřebec	6	3	2
3	(South Africa) Frank McDonald	4	6	3	7	8
6	(Finland) Sten Stahle	6	4	6	5	6

Second round
(Australia) Ross Case	4	4	6
(United States) Dan O'Bryant	6	6	8
(United Kingdom) Peter Curtis	6	6	6
(South Africa) Frank McDonald	1	2	0

Qualifying competition
(United States) Dan O'Bryant	6	3	4	1
(United Kingdom) Peter Curtis	4	6	6	6

=== Eighth qualifier ===
First round
1	(Australia) Graham Primrose	12	6	6
8	(United Kingdom) Clay Iles	10	2	2
4	(United States) Stephen Fiske	6	3	6	6
5	(South Africa) Mel Baleson	4	6	3	4
2	(Poland) Mieczysław Rybarczyk	6	3	1	6	7
7	(Netherlands) Fred Hemmes	3	6	6	1	5
3	(Australia) John Bartlett	6	6	6
6	(Indonesia) Atet Wijono	1	3	1

Second round
(Australia) Graham Primrose	3	9	4
(United States) Stephen Fiske	6	11	6
(Poland) Mieczysław Rybarczyk	4	0	6
(Australia) John Bartlett	6	6	8

Qualifying competition
(United States) Stephen Fiske	4	4	4
(Australia) John Bartlett	6	6	6

=== Ninth qualifier ===
First round
1	(Australia) Syd Ball	7	6	6
8	(United Kingdom) Keith Wooldridge	5	2	3
4	(France) Jean-Paul Meyer	6	3	4	6	6
5	(New Zealand) Ian Beverley	4	6	6	3	4
2	(Australia) Kim Warwick	6	6	4	6
7	(United Kingdom) Simon Partridge	4	4	6	3
3	(Jamaica) Lance Lumsden	3	3	6	6	6
6	(Australia) Bob Rheinberger	6	6	3	0	0

Second round
(Australia) Syd Ball	6	6	6
(France) Jean-Paul Meyer	3	4	3
(Australia) Kim Warwick	7	12	4
(Jamaica) Lance Lumsden	9	14	6

Qualifying competition
(Australia) Syd Ball	6	6	6
(Jamaica) Lance Lumsden	1	4	4

=== Tenth qualifier ===
First round
1	(Ecuador) Eduardo Zuleta	7	6	6
8	(United Kingdom) David Segal	5	3	2
4	(South Africa) Dennis Matthews	6	6	3	3	8
5	(South Africa) Anthony Fawcett	2	2	6	6	6
2	(Australia) Allan McDonald	8	6	4	7
7	(Canada) Tony Bardsley	6	4	6	5
3	(United Kingdom) Ken Weatherley	2	6	11
6	(United Kingdom) John De Mendoza	6	4	9^{r}

Second round
(Ecuador) Eduardo Zuleta	6	2	6	7	6
(South Africa) Dennis Matthews	3	6	2	9	3
(Australia) Allan McDonald	1	6	10	6
(United Kingdom) Ken Weatherley	6	2	8	4

Qualifying competition
(Ecuador) Eduardo Zuleta	5	8	5
(Australia) Allan McDonald	7	10	7
