= 1969 French Open – Men's doubles =

Men's doubles
- 1969 French Open

Final
- Champion: (Australia) John Newcombe (Australia) Tony Roche
- Runner-up: (Australia) Roy Emerson (Australia) Rod Laver
- Score: 4–6, 6–1, 3–6, 6–4, 6–4

Details
- Draw: 83
- Seeds: 16

Events
Singles	men	women		boys	girls
Doubles	men	women	mixed	boys	girls
WC Singles	men	women	quad
WC Doubles	men	women	quad
Legends	−45	45+	women
← 1968 ·	French Open	· 1970 →

Ken Rosewall and Fred Stolle were the defending champions but lost in the quarterfinals to Ilie Năstase and Ion Țiriac.

John Newcombe and Tony Roche won in the final 4–6, 6–1, 3–6, 6–4, 6–4 against Roy Emerson and Rod Laver.

== Seeds ==
1. (Australia) John Newcombe / (Australia) Tony Roche (champions)
2. (Australia) Ken Rosewall / (Australia) Fred Stolle (quarterfinals)
3. (Australia) Roy Emerson / (Australia) Rod Laver (final)
4. (South Africa) Bob Hewitt / (South Africa) Frew McMillan (quarterfinals)
5. (Netherlands) Tom Okker / (United States) Marty Riessen (semifinals)
6. (United States) Alex Olmedo / (United States) Stan Smith (fourth round)
7. (Romania) Ilie Năstase / (Romania) Ion Țiriac (semifinals)
8. (Spain) Andrés Gimeno / (Spain) Manuel Santana (fourth round)
9. (United States) Arthur Ashe / (United States) Charlie Pasarell (quarterfinals)
10. (United States) Ron Holmberg / (United States) Dennis Ralston (second round)
11. (Australia) Bill Bowrey / (Australia) Ray Ruffels (quarterfinals)
12. (Australia) John Alexander / (Australia) Phil Dent (second round)
13. (France) Pierre Barthès / (Socialist Federal Republic of Yugoslavia) Nikola Pilić (fourth round)
14. (Soviet Union) Tomas Lejus / (Soviet Union) Alex Metreveli (fourth round)
15. (United States) Butch Buchholz / (South Africa) Raymond Moore (second round)
16. (South Africa) Cliff Drysdale / (United Kingdom) Roger Taylor (withdrew)

== Draw ==
=== Key ===
- Q = Qualifier
- WC = Wild card
- LL = Lucky loser
- Alt = Alternate
- ITF = ITF entry
- PR = Protected ranking
- SR = Special ranking
- SE = Special exempt
- JE = Junior exempt
- JR = Junior Accelerator Programme entrant
- CO = College Accelerator Programme entrant
- NG = Next Gen Accelerator Program entrant
- w/o = Walkover
- r = Retired
- d = Defaulted

=== Finals ===
Quarterfinals
2	(Australia) Ken Rosewall (Australia) Fred Stolle	4	1	5
7	(Romania) Ilie Năstase (Romania) Ion Țiriac	6	6	7
3	(Australia) Roy Emerson (Australia) Rod Laver	1	6	6	6
11	(Australia) Bill Bowrey (Australia) Ray Ruffels	6	3	3	2
5	(Netherlands) Tom Okker (United States) Marty Riessen	7	6	7
4	(South Africa) Bob Hewitt (South Africa) Frew McMillan	5	3	5
9	(United States) Arthur Ashe (United States) Charlie Pasarell	4	6	4	3
1	(Australia) John Newcombe (Australia) Tony Roche	6	4	6	6

Semifinals
7	(Romania) Ilie Năstase (Romania) Ion Țiriac	1	2	2
3	(Australia) Roy Emerson (Australia) Rod Laver	6	6	6
5	(Netherlands) Tom Okker (United States) Marty Riessen	4	5	5
1	(Australia) John Newcombe (Australia) Tony Roche	6	7	7

Final
3	(Australia) Roy Emerson (Australia) Rod Laver	6	1	6	4	4
1	(Australia) John Newcombe (Australia) Tony Roche	4	6	3	6	6

=== Top half ===
==== Section 1 ====
First round

Second round
2	(Australia) K Rosewall (Australia) F Stolle	6	6	6
(Iran) MH Akbari (Iran) T Akbari	2	1	0
(United States) T Edlefsen (United States) T Gorman
(France) A Bouteleux (France) M Leclercq	w/o
15	(United States) B Buchholz (South Africa) R Moore	5	6	6	4	5
(Italy) F Bartoni (Italy) E Castigliano	7	0	4	6	7
(New Zealand) O Parun (Australia) B Phillips-Moore	2	8	1
(Spain) JL Arilla (Spain) M Orantes	6	10	6

Third round
2	(Australia) K Rosewall (Australia) F Stolle	6	6	6
(France) A Bouteleux (France) M Leclercq	1	1	2
(Italy) F Bartoni (Italy) E Castigliano	2	4	2
(Spain) JL Arilla (Spain) M Orantes	6	6	6

Fourth round
2	(Australia) K Rosewall (Australia) F Stolle	6	6	6
(Spain) JL Arilla (Spain) M Orantes	4	1	3

==== Section 2 ====
First round

Second round
7	(Romania) I Năstase (Romania) I Țiriac	6	6	6
(France) P Joly (France) F Pierson	3	2	1
(France) J-P Courcol (France) B Paul	6	4	6	4	6
(Japan) J Kawamori (Japan) K Watanabe	3	6	2	6	2
10	(United States) R Holmberg (United States) D Ralston	9	3	4	4
(West Germany) H-J Plötz (West Germany) H-J Pohmann	7	6	6	6
(Italy) M Mulligan (Italy) N Pietrangeli	7	6	6
(United Kingdom) J Barrett (United Kingdom) D Lloyd	5	2	4

Third round
7	(Romania) I Năstase (Romania) I Țiriac	6	6	6
(France) J-P Courcol (France) B Paul	4	2	2
(West Germany) H-J Plötz (West Germany) H-J Pohmann	6	9	6
(Italy) M Mulligan (Italy) N Pietrangeli	4	7	0

Fourth round
7	(Romania) I Năstase (Romania) I Țiriac	6	9	10
(West Germany) H-J Plötz (West Germany) H-J Pohmann	3	7	8

==== Section 3 ====
First round
(France) J-C Barclay (South Africa) T Ryan	3	6	6	6
(Australia) J Bartlett (Australia) G Masters	6	1	2	1
(United States) M Estep (United States) Z Guerry	3	8	0	6	6
(West Germany) I Buding (West Germany) J Fassbender	6	6	6	4	3

Second round
3	(Australia) R Emerson (Australia) R Laver	6	6	6
(France) P Fremoit (Belgium) C Janssens	2	3	4
(Socialist Federal Republic of Yugoslavia) Ž Franulović (Socialist Federal Republic of Yugoslavia) B Jovanović	8	6	6
(Australia) P Doerner (Australia) J Gardner	6	4	3
14	(Soviet Union) T Lejus (Soviet Union) A Metreveli	6	9	6
(New Zealand) J McDonald (Australia) J Moore	2	7	2
(France) J-C Barclay (South Africa) T Ryan	7	6	6
(United States) M Estep (United States) Z Guerry	5	2	2

Third round
3	(Australia) R Emerson (Australia) R Laver	w/o
(Socialist Federal Republic of Yugoslavia) Ž Franulović (Socialist Federal Republic of Yugoslavia) B Jovanović
14	(Soviet Union) T Lejus (Soviet Union) A Metreveli	6	9	2	3	6
(France) J-C Barclay (South Africa) T Ryan	2	7	6	6	3

Fourth round
3	(Australia) R Emerson (Australia) R Laver	6	6	6
14	(Soviet Union) T Lejus (Soviet Union) A Metreveli	1	2	2

==== Section 4 ====
First round
6	(United States) A Olmedo (United States) S Smith	w/o
(France) JL Auget (France) P Loizeau
(Australia) B Howe (South Africa) A Segal	6	6	6
(Soviet Union) A Ivanov (Soviet Union) V Palman	3	2	4
(Australia) B Carmichael (United Arab Republic) I El Shafei	6	6	6
(Italy) M Di Domenico (Italy) A Panatta	2	2	2
(United Kingdom) S Matthews (United Kingdom) K Wooldridge
(France) P Dominguez (France) P Proisy	w/o
11	(Australia) B Bowrey (Australia) R Ruffels	6	6	6
(France) F Battegay (France) T Bernasconi	4	4	3
(France) C Duxin (France) J-P Olivier	w/o
(Italy) S Palmieri (Italy) Luigi Pirro
(Czechoslovakia) J Kodeš (Czechoslovakia) J Kukal	w/o
(Australia) S Ball (Australia) B Giltinan
(United States) D Dell (India) J Mukerjea
(France) J-P Meyer (France) J Thamin	w/o

Second round
6	(United States) A Olmedo (United States) S Smith	6	6	6
(Australia) B Howe (South Africa) A Segal	1	3	1
(Australia) B Carmichael (United Arab Republic) I El Shafei	6	6	2	6
(France) P Dominguez (France) P Proisy	4	3	6	3
11	(Australia) B Bowrey (Australia) R Ruffels	6	6	6
(France) C Duxin (France) J-P Olivier	1	3	1
(Czechoslovakia) J Kodeš (Czechoslovakia) J Kukal	6	6	6
(France) J-P Meyer (France) J Thamin	3	4	1

Third round
6	(United States) A Olmedo (United States) S Smith	0	6	12	9
(Australia) B Carmichael (United Arab Republic) I El Shafei	6	1	10	7
11	(Australia) B Bowrey (Australia) R Ruffels	3	6	9	6
(Czechoslovakia) J Kodeš (Czechoslovakia) J Kukal	6	3	7	4

Fourth round
6	(United States) A Olmedo (United States) S Smith	6	4	6	9
11	(Australia) B Bowrey (Australia) R Ruffels	8	6	3	11

=== Bottom half ===
==== Section 5 ====
First round
(France) A Bresson (France) F Matheu	3	10	6	6
(Switzerland) D Sturdza (Italy) S Tacchini	6	12	3	8
(Iran) I Khodaei (Jamaica) L Lumsden
(South Africa) B Maud (United States) C Richey	w/o
(Italy) E Di Matteo (Italy) P Toci	4	1	0
(Colombia) W Álvarez (Colombia) J Velasco	6	6	6
(France) R Haillet (France) B Montrenaud
12	(Australia) J Alexander (Australia) P Dent	w/o
(Canada) M Belkin (Ecuador) P Guzmán
(Belgium) E Drossart (Belgium) P Hombergen	w/o
(Australia) E McCabe (Finland) S Stahle
(France) D Contet (France) F Jauffret	w/o
(Argentina) R Peralta (Brazil) LF Tavares
(Italy) G Di Maso (Colombia) I Molina	w/o
(Italy) V Crotta (Italy) P Marzano	4	4	2
5	(Netherlands) T Okker (United States) M Riessen	6	6	6

Second round
(Switzerland) D Sturdza (Italy) S Tacchini	5	1	2
(South Africa) B Maud (United States) C Richey	7	6	6
(Colombia) W Álvarez (Colombia) J Velasco	3	5	9	6	6
12	(Australia) J Alexander (Australia) P Dent	6	7	7	1	4
(Belgium) E Drossart (Belgium) P Hombergen	6	2^{r}
(France) D Contet (France) F Jauffret	3	5
(Italy) G Di Maso (Colombia) I Molina	1	0	2
5	(Netherlands) T Okker (United States) M Riessen	6	6	6

Third round
(South Africa) B Maud (United States) C Richey	6	6	8
(Colombia) W Álvarez (Colombia) J Velasco	2	2	6
(France) D Contet (France) F Jauffret	3	1	0
5	(Netherlands) T Okker (United States) M Riessen	6	6	6

Fourth round
(South Africa) B Maud (United States) C Richey	6	8	3	4
5	(Netherlands) T Okker (United States) M Riessen	3	10	6	6

==== Section 6 ====
First round
(Socialist Federal Republic of Yugoslavia) N Špear (Japan) K Yanagi
(France) Alain Cassaigne (France) É Derasse	w/o

Second round
(France) A Cassaigne (France) É Derasse
(Italy) G Merlo (Chile) P Rodríguez	w/o
(Poland) W Gasiorek (Czechoslovakia) Š Koudelka	2	4	5
13	(France) P Barthès (Socialist Federal Republic of Yugoslavia) N Pilić	6	6	7
(France) G Goven (France) W N'Godrella	6	4	9	4	1
(Hungary) I Gulyás (Greece) N Kalogeropoulos	4	6	7	6	6
(Bolivia) E Gorostiaga (Republic of Ireland) M Hickey	3	2	2
4	(South Africa) B Hewitt (South Africa) F McMillan	6	6	6

Third round
(Italy) G Merlo (Chile) P Rodríguez	1	1	2
13	(France) P Barthès (Socialist Federal Republic of Yugoslavia) N Pilić	6	6	6
(Hungary) I Gulyás (Greece) N Kalogeropoulos	7	1	1
4	(South Africa) B Hewitt (South Africa) F McMillan	9	6	6

Fourth round
13	(France) P Barthès (Socialist Federal Republic of Yugoslavia) N Pilić	0	0	4
4	(South Africa) B Hewitt (South Africa) F McMillan	6	6	6

==== Section 7 ====
First round

Second round
(Romania) S Dron (Romania) P Mărmureanu	3	2	2
(Australia) D Crealy (Australia) A Stone	6	6	6
(Australia) G Hogben (Australia) Ross
9	(United States) A Ashe (United States) C Pasarell	w/o
(France) P Darmon (France) G Deniau	2	4	1
(United States) D Dell (India) P Lall	6	6	6
(Poland) T Nowicki (Poland) M Rybarczyk	0	0	7
8	(Spain) A Gimeno (Spain) M Santana	6	6	9

Third round
(Australia) D Crealy (Australia) A Stone	6	4	4
9	(United States) A Ashe (United States) C Pasarell	8	6	6
(United States) D Dell (India) P Lall	2	0	3
8	(Spain) A Gimeno (Spain) M Santana	6	6	6

Fourth round
9	(United States) A Ashe (United States) C Pasarell	w/o
8	(Spain) A Gimeno (Spain) M Santana

==== Section 8 ====
First round

Second round
(Czechoslovakia) M Holeček (Czechoslovakia) V Zedník	6	6	6
(Spain) A Muñoz (Sweden) H Nerell	4	3	3
(Australia) A Gardiner (Australia) A Hammond	w/o
16	(South Africa) C Drysdale (United Kingdom) R Taylor
(France) P Beust (France) J-L Rouyer	6	6	6
(Chile) L Ayala (Denmark) T Ulrich	3	4	4
(Socialist Federal Republic of Yugoslavia) Z Ivančić (Socialist Federal Republic of Yugoslavia) D Štolcer	1	0	1
1	(Australia) J Newcombe (Australia) T Roche	6	6	6

Third round
(Czechoslovakia) M Holeček (Czechoslovakia) V Zedník	6	6	11	6
(Australia) A Gardiner (Australia) A Hammond	4	2	13	4
(France) P Beust (France) J-L Rouyer	4	3	6	3
1	(Australia) J Newcombe (Australia) T Roche	6	6	2	6

Fourth round
(Czechoslovakia) M Holeček (Czechoslovakia) V Zedník	2	0	4
1	(Australia) J Newcombe (Australia) T Roche	6	6	6
