= 1969 French Open – Men's singles =

Men's singles
- 1969 French Open

Final
- Champion: (Australia) Rod Laver
- Runner-up: (Australia) Ken Rosewall
- Score: 6–4, 6–3, 6–4

Details
- Draw: 128
- Seeds: 16

Events
Singles	men	women		boys	girls
Doubles	men	women	mixed	boys	girls
WC Singles	men	women	quad
WC Doubles	men	women	quad
Legends	−45	45+	women
← 1968 ·	French Open	· 1970 →

Rod Laver defeated defending champion Ken Rosewall in a rematch of the previous year's final, 6–4, 6–3, 6–4 to win the men's singles tennis title at the 1969 French Open. It was his second French title and ninth Grand Slam tournament singles title overall. It was the second leg of his eventual second Grand Slam, which remains the only Grand Slam achieved in men's singles tennis in the Open Era.

== Seeds ==
The seeded players are listed below. Rod Laver is the champion; others show the round in which they were eliminated.

1. (Australia) Rod Laver (champion)
2. (Australia) Tony Roche (semifinals)
3. (Australia) Ken Rosewall (final)
4. (Australia) John Newcombe (quarterfinals)
5. (Netherlands) Tom Okker (semifinals)
6. (United States) Arthur Ashe (fourth round)
7. (Australia) Roy Emerson (fourth round)
8. (Spain) Andrés Gimeno (quarterfinals)
9. (Spain) Manuel Santana (fourth round)
10. (Socialist Federal Republic of Yugoslavia) Željko Franulović (quarterfinals)
11. (United States) Marty Riessen (second round)
12. (United Arab Republic) Ismail El Shafei (third round)
13. (Czechoslovakia) Jan Kodeš (fourth round)
14. (South Africa) Bob Hewitt (third round)
15. (United States) Earl Butch Buchholz (second round)
16. (United States) Stan Smith (fourth round)

== Draw ==
=== Key ===
- Q = Qualifier
- WC = Wild card
- LL = Lucky loser
- r = Retired

=== Finals ===
Quarterfinals
2	(Australia) Tony Roche	4	7	6	4	6
10	(Socialist Federal Republic of Yugoslavia) Željko Franulović	6	5	0	6	1
3	(Australia) Ken Rosewall	12	4	7	6
(Australia) Fred Stolle	10	6	5	2
5	(Netherlands) Tom Okker	5	6	4	6	6
4	(Australia) John Newcombe	7	2	6	2	2
8	(Spain) Andrés Gimeno	6	3	4	3
1	(Australia) Rod Laver	3	6	6	6

Semifinals
2	(Australia) Tony Roche	5	2	2
3	(Australia) Ken Rosewall	7	6	6
5	(Netherlands) Tom Okker	6	0	2	4
1	(Australia) Rod Laver	4	6	6	6

Final
3	(Australia) Ken Rosewall	4	3	4
1	(Australia) Rod Laver	6	6	6

=== Top half ===
==== Section 1 ====
First round
2	(Australia) T Roche
(India) C Mukerjea	w/o
(West Germany) HJ Pohmann	6	6	6
Q	(Italy) A Panatta	2	2	3
(United Kingdom) K Wooldridge	3	4	2
(Socialist Federal Republic of Yugoslavia) N Pilić	6	6	6
(Iran) MH Akbari	4	4	0
(Australia) A Stone	6	6	6
15	(United States) EB Buchholz	6	6	6
(Italy) G Di Maso	1	0	2
(Poland) W Gąsiorek	4	6	1	6	6
(France) D Contet	6	4	6	2	2
(Australia) P Dent	0	7	3	6	7
(Iran) T Akbari	6	5	6	3	5
(Czechoslovakia) Š Koudelka	6	7	7
Q	(West Germany) J Fassbender	4	5	5

Second round
2	(Australia) T Roche	7	6	6
(West Germany) HJ Pohmann	5	2	1
(Socialist Federal Republic of Yugoslavia) N Pilić	6	7	3	3	4
(Australia) A Stone	4	5	6	6	6
15	(United States) EB Buchholz	1	0	4
(Poland) W Gąsiorek	6	6	6
(Australia) P Dent	6	0	6	0
(Czechoslovakia) Š Koudelka	1	6	8	6

Third round
2	(Australia) T Roche	6	6	6
(Australia) A Stone	3	4	4
(Poland) W Gąsiorek	6	6	6
(Czechoslovakia) Š Koudelka	2	1	3

Fourth round
2	(Australia) T Roche	6	8	6
(Poland) W Gąsiorek	4	6	2

==== Section 2 ====
First round
7	(Australia) R Emerson	3	6	5	6	6
(South Africa) R Moore	6	2	7	0	3
(Poland) T Nowicki
(Ecuador) P Guzmán	w/o
(Italy) E Castigliano	1	4	3
Q	(Italy) M Di Domenico	6	6	6
Q	(Australia) J Bartlett	6	1	6	5	6
(Colombia) I Molina	4	6	3	7	4
10	(Socialist Federal Republic of Yugoslavia) Z Franulović	6	6	6
Q	(France) B Detroye	1	3	2
(Sweden) H Nerell	6	6	3	6
(Australia) R Ruffels	0	1	6	4
Q	(France) P Proisy	6	1	7	5	2
(United States) D Ralston	1	6	5	7	6
(Soviet Union) T Leius	5	2	7	5
(Chile) P Rodríguez	7	6	5	7

Second round
7	(Australia) R Emerson	6	6	6
(Poland) T Nowicki	3	2	2
Q	(Italy) M Di Domenico	5	6	6	6
Q	(Australia) J Bartlett	7	4	4	4
10	(Socialist Federal Republic of Yugoslavia) Z Franulović	6	6	6
(Sweden) H Nerell	0	2	0
(United States) D Ralston	6	6	0	0	6
(Chile) P Rodríguez	2	4	6	6	4

Third round
7	(Australia) R Emerson	6	4	6	6
Q	(Italy) M Di Domenico	2	6	1	4
10	(Socialist Federal Republic of Yugoslavia) Z Franulović	6	6	6
(United States) D Ralston	2	0	1

Fourth round
7	(Australia) R Emerson	6	3	0	2
10	(Socialist Federal Republic of Yugoslavia) Z Franulović	1	6	6	6

==== Section 3 ====
First round
3	(Australia) K Rosewall	7	6	6
(France) M Leclercq	5	4	2
(Czechoslovakia) M Holeček
(United Kingdom) R Taylor	w/o
(United States) T Edlefsen	6	6	4	2
(France) F Jauffret	2	8	6	6
(Soviet Union) V Palman	3	4	4
(Australia) M Mulligan	6	6	6
14	(South Africa) B Hewitt	8	6	6
(United States) R Holmberg	6	2	4
Q	(Australia) G Masters	4	3	2
(France) JC Barclay	6	6	6
Q	(Italy) P Toci	3	6	6	6	6
(Italy) G Merlo	6	4	4	8	4
(Hungary) I Gulyás	6	5	6	8
Q	(United States) T Gorman	3	7	1	6

Second round
3	(Australia) K Rosewall	6	6	6
(Czechoslovakia) M Holeček	0	3	1
(France) F Jauffret	0	7	6	2
(Australia) M Mulligan	6	9	4	6
14	(South Africa) B Hewitt	6	6	6
(France) JC Barclay	4	4	2
Q	(Italy) P Toci	4	6	3
(Hungary) I Gulyás	6	8	6

Third round
3	(Australia) K Rosewall	4	6	6	6
(Australia) M Mulligan	6	2	2	1
14	(South Africa) B Hewitt	9	0	6	5
(Hungary) I Gulyás	11	6	0	7

Fourth round
3	(Australia) K Rosewall	6	6	6
(Hungary) I Gulyás	1	2	1

==== Section 4 ====
First round
6	(United States) A Ashe	6	6	6
(Canada) H Fauquier	2	0	3
(France) J-P Courcol	5	7	6	6
(Italy) E Di Matteo	7	5	1	0
(France) JL Rouyer	6	6	6
(South Africa) A Segal	2	2	2
Q	(France) F Pierson	1	2	2
(Australia) B Phillips-Moore	6	6	6
11	(United States) M Riessen	6	6	6
(France) B Montrenaud	4	0	0
(Australia) F Stolle	6	6	6
(Belgium) C De Gronckel	4	0	3
(Austria) P Pokorny	6	8	3	5
Q	(Italy) S Palmieri	3	10	6	7
(Czechoslovakia) J Kukal	6	8	0
(France) R Haillet	1	6	15	r.

Second round
6	(United States) A Ashe	6	2	4	6	6
(France) J-P Courcol	2	6	6	3	2
(France) JL Rouyer	6	4	4	4
(Australia) B Phillips-Moore	3	6	6	6
11	(United States) M Riessen	2	6	8	2	3
(Australia) F Stolle	6	4	6	6	6
Q	(Italy) S Palmieri	2	2	1
(Czechoslovakia) J Kukal	6	6	6

Third round
6	(United States) A Ashe	6	6	6
(Australia) B Phillips-Moore	4	3	1
(Australia) F Stolle	2	6	6	6
(Czechoslovakia) J Kukal	6	1	3	4

Fourth round
6	(United States) A Ashe	2	0	4
(Australia) F Stolle	6	6	6

=== Bottom half ===
==== Section 5 ====
First round
(United Kingdom) D Lloyd	2	3	1
(United States) C Richey	6	6	6
Q	(United States) M Estep	2	3	1
(Chile) L Ayala	6	6	6
(Soviet Union) A Ivanov	0	3	4
(Czechoslovakia) V Zednik	6	6	6
Q	(United Kingdom) J Barrett	4	4	5
12	(United Arab Republic) I El Shafei	6	6	7
Q	(United Kingdom) S Matthews	6	0	0	6	8
(Romania) I Năstase	3	6	6	4	6
(Canada) M Belkin	6	7	0	r.
(France) G Goven	4	5	3
(France) P Barthès	6	6	8
(Spain) JL Arilla	4	4	6
(France) B Paul	3	2	0
5	(Netherlands) T Okker	6	6	6

Second round
(United States) C Richey	6	6	8	9
(Chile) L Ayala	4	3	10	7
(Czechoslovakia) V Zednik	0	1	2
12	(United Arab Republic) I El Shafei	6	6	6
Q	(United Kingdom) S Matthews	6	8	3	1
(France) G Goven	8	6	6	6
(France) P Barthès	3	0	4
5	(Netherlands) T Okker	6	6	6

Third round
(United States) C Richey	6	7	6	6
12	(United Arab Republic) I El Shafei	2	5	8	1
(France) G Goven	2	2	5
5	(Netherlands) T Okker	6	6	7

Fourth round
(United States) C Richey	7	3	3
5	(Netherlands) T Okker	9	6	6

==== Section 6 ====
First round
(France) P Beust	6	6	6	6
(Poland) M Rybarczyk	2	0	8	1
(Socialist Federal Republic of Yugoslavia) Z Ivančić	2	0	0
(South Africa) R Maud	6	6	6
Q	(Poland) A Licis	7	3	3
(Australia) R Howe	9	6	6
(Belgium) E Drossart	1	3	3
13	(Czechoslovakia) J Kodeš	6	6	6
(Spain) M Orantes	4	6	6	6
(Denmark) T Ulrich	6	2	3	3
(West Germany) HJ Plötz	0	6	6	2	6
Q	(United States) Z Guerry	6	2	1	6	8
(Australia) W Bowrey	6	8	6
(Italy) V Crotta	4	6	1
(United States) C Pasarell	1	2	5
4	(Australia) J Newcombe	6	6	7

Second round
(France) P Beust	3	4	1
(South Africa) R Maud	6	6	6
(Australia) R Howe	0	2	6
13	(Czechoslovakia) J Kodeš	6	6	8
(Spain) M Orantes	6	6	6
Q	(United States) Z Guerry	1	3	3
(Australia) W Bowrey	3	2	2
4	(Australia) J Newcombe	6	6	6

Third round
(South Africa) R Maud	2	6	9	3
13	(Czechoslovakia) J Kodeš	6	4	11	6
(Spain) M Orantes	4	3	6	3
4	(Australia) J Newcombe	6	6	4	6

Fourth round
13	(Czechoslovakia) J Kodeš	1	4	6	10	9
4	(Australia) J Newcombe	6	6	0	8	11

==== Section 7 ====
First round
(United States) A Olmedo	7	4	0
(Australia) B Carmichael	9	6	6
(South Africa) F McMillan	6	6	6
(New Zealand) O Parun	3	4	4
(Romania) I Țiriac	6	7	6
(Greece) N Kalogeropoulos	2	5	0
(South Africa) C Drysdale	7	4	2	0
9	(Spain) M Santana	5	6	6	6
(Colombia) W Álvarez
(Jamaica) L Lumsden	w/o
(Romania) P Mărmureanu	6	6	6
(Italy) N Pietrangeli	3	3	2
(West Germany) I Buding	6	6	6
(Australia) A Gardiner	3	0	4
(Socialist Federal Republic of Yugoslavia) N Špear	w/o
8	(Spain) A Gimeno

Second round
(Australia) B Carmichael	6	6	6
(South Africa) F McMillan	3	1	2
(Romania) I Țiriac	3	5	3
9	(Spain) M Santana	6	7	6
(Colombia) W Álvarez	6	3	5	6
(Romania) P Mărmureanu	3	6	7	8
(West Germany) I Buding	1	3	6
8	(Spain) A Gimeno	6	6	8

Third round
(Australia) B Carmichael	2	2	1
9	(Spain) M Santana	6	6	6
(Romania) P Mărmureanu	4	1	0
8	(Spain) A Gimeno	6	6	6

Fourth round
9	(Spain) M Santana	6	6	4	4	0
8	(Spain) A Gimeno	4	2	6	6	1

==== Section 8 ====
First round
(Romania) S Dron	6	4	4	4
(India) P Lall	4	6	6	6
(Soviet Union) A Metreveli	6	4	7	4	4
(South Africa) T Ryan	4	6	5	6	6
(Belgium) P Hombergen	6	8	4	4	8
(Australia) J Alexander	2	6	6	6	6
(Socialist Federal Republic of Yugoslavia) B Jovanović	6	6	4	5	4
16	(United States) S Smith	3	3	6	7	6
(Republic of Ireland) M Hickey	1	3	2
(Italy) P Marzano	6	6	6
(Socialist Federal Republic of Yugoslavia) D Stolcer	6	2	1
(Colombia) J Velasco Sr.	8	6	6
(Switzerland) D Sturdza	4	6	5	2
(Australia) D Crealy	6	4	7	6
(Japan) K Watanabe	1	1	1
1	(Australia) R Laver	6	6	6

Second round
(India) P Lall	6	6	6
(South Africa) T Ryan	1	2	3
(Belgium) P Hombergen	3	1	2
16	(United States) S Smith	6	6	6
(Italy) P Marzano	6	6	6
(Colombia) J Velasco Sr.	3	4	4
(Australia) D Crealy	6	9	2	2	4
1	(Australia) R Laver	3	7	6	6	6

Third round
(India) P Lall	6	3	1	6	0
16	(United States) S Smith	3	6	6	4	6
(Italy) P Marzano	1	0	6
1	(Australia) R Laver	6	6	8

Fourth round
16	(United States) S Smith	4	2	4
1	(Australia) R Laver	6	6	6

== See also ==
- Laver-Rosewall rivalry

Preceded by 1969 Australian Open – Men's singles	Grand Slam men's singles	Succeeded by 1969 Wimbledon Championships – Men's singles
