= 1971 Italian Open – Men's singles =

Men's singles
- 1971 Italian Open

Final
- Champion: (Australia) Rod Laver
- Runner-up: (Czechoslovakia) Jan Kodeš
- Score: 4–6, 6–3, 7–5, 6–4

Details
- Draw: 48
- Seeds: 8

Events
Singles	men	women
Doubles	men	women
← 1970 ·	Italian Open	· 1972 →

The 1971 Italian Open – Men's singles was an event of the 1971 Italian Open tennis tournament and was played at the Foro Italico in Rome, Italy from 3 May through 10 May 1971. Ilie Năstase was the defending champion but did not compete in this edition. Fourth-seeded Rod Laver claimed the singles title, defeating Jan Kodeš in the final, 4–6, 6–3, 7–5, 6–4.

== Seeds ==
1. (Australia) John Newcombe (quarterfinals)
2. (United States) Arthur Ashe (semifinals)
3. (South Africa) Cliff Drysdale (quarterfinals)
4. (Australia) Rod Laver (champion)
5. (United States) Stan Smith (quarterfinals)
6. (Netherlands) Tom Okker (semifinals)
7. (Australia) Roy Emerson (quarterfinals)
8. (Australia) Tony Roche (third round)

== Draw ==
=== Key ===
- Q = Qualifier
- WC = Wild card
- LL = Lucky loser
- Alt = Alternate
- ITF = ITF entry
- PR = Protected ranking
- SR = Special ranking
- SE = Special exempt
- JE = Junior exempt
- JR = Junior Accelerator Programme entrant
- CO = College Accelerator Programme entrant
- NG = Next Gen Accelerator Program entrant
- w/o = Walkover
- r = Retired
- d = Defaulted

=== Finals ===
Quarterfinals
2	(United States) Arthur Ashe	6	3	6
7	(Australia) Roy Emerson	4	6	4
4	(Australia) Rod Laver	6	2	6
5	(United States) Stan Smith	1	6	2
6	(Netherlands) Tom Okker	6	6
3	(South Africa) Cliff Drysdale	3	4
(Czechoslovakia) Jan Kodeš	2	6	7
1	(Australia) John Newcombe	6	1	5

Semifinals
2	(United States) Arthur Ashe	3	2	1
4	(Australia) Rod Laver	6	6	6
6	(Netherlands) Tom Okker	6	3	5	4
(Czechoslovakia) Jan Kodeš	4	6	7	6

Final
4	(Australia) Rod Laver	7	6	6
(Czechoslovakia) Jan Kodeš	5	3	3

=== Top half ===
==== Section 1 ====
First round
(Italy) A Panatta	6	6	6
(Australia) B Bowrey	1	7	4
(United Kingdom) R Taylor	6	6
(Australia) P Dent	2	3
(Socialist Federal Republic of Yugoslavia) N Pilić	7	6
(Australia) R Ruffels	6	4
(Australia) O Davidson	6	5	1
(Socialist Federal Republic of Yugoslavia) B Jovanović	4	7	6

Second round
2	(United States) A Ashe	7	6
(Italy) A Panatta	5	4
(New Zealand) B Fairlie	1	6	3
(United Kingdom) R Taylor	6	0	6
7	(Australia) R Emerson	2	6	6
(Socialist Federal Republic of Yugoslavia) N Pilić	6	4	3
(United States) D Ralston	7	5	6
(Socialist Federal Republic of Yugoslavia) B Jovanović	5	7	3

Third round
2	(United States) A Ashe	6	6
(United Kingdom) R Taylor	3	2
7	(Australia) R Emerson	6	3	6
(United States) D Ralston	4	6	4

Quarterfinals
2	(United States) A Ashe	6	3	6
7	(Australia) R Emerson	4	6	4

==== Section 2 ====
First round
(Denmark) T Ulrich	6	4	4
(United States) T Gorman	2	6	6
(Australia) A Stone	2	2
(Italy) E di Matteo	6	6
(United States) R Barth	6	1	6
(Italy) F Bartoni	1	6	4
(Australia) J Alexander	4	6	3
(Italy) A Zugarelli	6	1	6

Second round
4	(Australia) R Laver	6	3	6
(United States) T Gorman	1	6	4
(United States) M Riessen	5	6	3
(Italy) E di Matteo	7	3	6
5	(United States) S Smith	3	6	6
(United States) R Barth	6	3	1
(United States) C Pasarell	4	4
(Italy) A Zugarelli	6	6

Third round
4	(Australia) R Laver	6	6
(Italy) E di Matteo	4	1
5	(United States) S Smith	4	6	6
(Italy) A Zugarelli	6	2	2

Quarterfinals
4	(Australia) R Laver	6	2	6
5	(United States) S Smith	1	6	2

=== Bottom half ===
==== Section 3 ====
First round
(Egypt) I El Shafei	6	6
(Australia) D Crealy	4	2
(United Kingdom) M Cox	4	6	6
(Denmark) J Leschly	6	3	4
(Italy) N Pietrangeli	6	6
(Italy) C Barazzutti	4	4
(Italy) P Toci	4	6
(South Africa) B Maud	6	7

Second round
(Egypt) I El Shafei	7	2	2
(Socialist Federal Republic of Yugoslavia) Ž Franulović	6	6	6
(United Kingdom) M Cox	3	5
6	(Netherlands) T Okker	6	7
(Italy) N Pietrangeli	5	r
(Spain) A Gimeno	7
(South Africa) B Maud	2	7	1
3	(South Africa) C Drysdale	6	5	6

Third round
(Socialist Federal Republic of Yugoslavia) Ž Franulović	7	4	1
6	(Netherlands) T Okker	5	6	6
(Spain) A Gimeno	3	6	3
3	(South Africa) C Drysdale	6	3	6

Quarterfinals
6	(Netherlands) T Okker	6	6
3	(South Africa) C Drysdale	3	4

==== Section 4 ====
First round
(Australia) F Stolle	6	6
(Italy) S Palmieri	1	2
(Italy) M di Domenico	6	6
(South Africa) F McMillan	3	4
(United Kingdom) G Stilwell	4	2
(Italy) G Majoli	6	6
(Australia) B Carmichael	6	1	3
(Italy) V Franchitti	4	6	6

Second round
(Australia) F Stolle	3	3
(Czechoslovakia) J Kodeš	6	6
(Italy) M di Domenico	2	3
8	(Australia) T Roche	6	6
(Italy) G Majoli	2	7	4
(United States) B Lutz	6	6	6
(Italy) V Franchitti	4	7	5
1	(Australia) J Newcombe	6	6	7

Third round
(Czechoslovakia) J Kodeš	6	5	7
8	(Australia) T Roche	4	7	6
(United States) B Lutz	3	1
1	(Australia) J Newcombe	6	6

Quarterfinals
(Czechoslovakia) J Kodeš	2	6	7
1	(Australia) J Newcombe	6	1	5
