= 1971 Italian Open – Men's doubles =

Men's doubles
- 1971 Italian Open

Final
- Champion: (Australia) John Newcombe (Australia) Tony Roche
- Runner-up: (Spain) Andrés Gimeno (United Kingdom) Roger Taylor
- Score: 6–4, 6–4

Details
- Draw: 24
- Seeds: 4

Events
Singles	men	women
Doubles	men	women
← 1970 ·	Italian Open	· 1972 →

The 1971 Italian Open – Men's doubles was an event of the 1971 Italian Open tennis tournament and was played at the Foro Italico in Rome, Italy from 3 May through 10 May 1971. The draw comprised 24 teams, four of them were seeded. Ilie Năstase and Ion Țiriac were the defending doubles champions but did not compete in this edition. First-seeded John Newcombe and Tony Roche won the doubles title, defeating unseeded Andrés Gimeno and Roger Taylor in the final, 6–4, 6–4.

== Seeds ==
1. (Australia) John Newcombe / (Australia) Tony Roche (champions)
2. (Netherlands) Tom Okker / (United States) Marty Riessen (second round)
3. (United States) Arthur Ashe / (United States) Dennis Ralston (quarterfinals)
4. (Australia) Roy Emerson / (Australia) Rod Laver (semifinals)

== Draw ==
=== Key ===
- Q = Qualifier
- WC = Wild card
- LL = Lucky loser
- Alt = Alternate
- ITF = ITF entry
- PR = Protected ranking
- SR = Special ranking
- SE = Special exempt
- JE = Junior exempt
- JR = Junior Accelerator Programme entrant
- CO = College Accelerator Programme entrant
- NG = Next Gen Accelerator Program entrant
- w/o = Walkover
- r = Retired
- d = Defaulted

=== Finals ===
Semifinals
(Spain) Andrés Gimeno (United Kingdom) Roger Taylor	6	6	7
(Australia) Bob Carmichael (Australia) Ray Ruffels	3	7	6
4	(Australia) Roy Emerson (Australia) Rod Laver	2	6	4
1	(Australia) John Newcombe (Australia) Tony Roche	6	2	6

Final
(Spain) Andrés Gimeno (United Kingdom) Roger Taylor	4	4
1	(Australia) John Newcombe (Australia) Tony Roche	6	6

=== Top half ===
First Round
3	(United States) Arthur Ashe (United States) Dennis Ralston	6	7
(Italy) Ezio Di Matteo (Italy) Tonino Zugarelli	4	6
(South Africa) Cliff Drysdale (Socialist Federal Republic of Yugoslavia) Nikola Pilić	6	7
(Egypt) Ismail El Shafei (New Zealand) Brian Fairlie	4	5
(Australia) Bob Carmichael (Australia) Ray Ruffels	7	2	6
(United States) Bob Lutz (United States) Charlie Pasarell	6	6	2
(Italy) Massimo Di Domenico (Italy) Adriano Panatta	3	6	6
(Australia) John Alexander (Australia) Phil Dent	6	3	3

Second Round
2	(Netherlands) Tom Okker (United States) Marty Riessen	3	4
(Italy) Franco Bartoni (Italy) Piero Toci	6	6
(Spain) Andrés Gimeno (United Kingdom) Roger Taylor	2	7	6
(Australia) Dick Crealy (Australia) Allan Stone	6	5	4
3	(United States) Arthur Ashe (United States) Dennis Ralston	6	3	7
(South Africa) Cliff Drysdale (Socialist Federal Republic of Yugoslavia) Nikola Pilić	1	6	6
(Australia) Bob Carmichael (Australia) Ray Ruffels	6	3	6
(Italy) Massimo Di Domenico (Italy) Adriano Panatta	3	6	1

Quarterfinals
(Italy) Franco Bartoni (Italy) Piero Toci	4	2
(Spain) Andrés Gimeno (United Kingdom) Roger Taylor	6	6
3	(United States) Arthur Ashe (United States) Dennis Ralston	5	6
(Australia) Bob Carmichael (Australia) Ray Ruffels	7	7

Semifinals
(Spain) Andrés Gimeno (United Kingdom) Roger Taylor	6	6	7
(Australia) Bob Carmichael (Australia) Ray Ruffels	3	7	6

=== Bottom half ===
First Round
(Socialist Federal Republic of Yugoslavia) Boro Jovanović (Australia) Fred Stolle	6	6
(Italy) Corrado Barazzutti (Italy) Vincenzo Franchitti	3	2
(Italy) Giordano Maioli (Italy) Nicola Pietrangeli	7	7
(United Kingdom) Mark Cox (United Kingdom) Graham Stilwell	5	6
(United States) Tom Gorman (United States) Stan Smith	6	6
(South Africa) Frew McMillan (South Africa) Bob Maud	3	3
(Denmark) Jan Leschly (Italy) Sergio Palmieri	2	3
4	(Australia) Roy Emerson (Australia) Rod Laver	6	6

Second Round
(Socialist Federal Republic of Yugoslavia) Boro Jovanović (Australia) Fred Stolle	w/o
(Italy) Giordano Maioli (Italy) Nicola Pietrangeli
(United States) Tom Gorman (United States) Stan Smith	2	4
4	(Australia) Roy Emerson (Australia) Rod Laver	6	6
(Australia) Bill Bowrey (Australia) Owen Davidson	6	5	6
(Socialist Federal Republic of Yugoslavia) Željko Franulović (Czechoslovakia) Jan Kodeš	2	7	4
(United States) Roy Barth (Denmark) Torben Ulrich	1	3
1	(Australia) John Newcombe (Australia) Tony Roche	6	6

Quarterfinals
(Socialist Federal Republic of Yugoslavia) Boro Jovanović (Australia) Fred Stolle	3	3
4	(Australia) Roy Emerson (Australia) Rod Laver	6	6
(Australia) Bill Bowrey (Australia) Owen Davidson	2	6	4
1	(Australia) John Newcombe (Australia) Tony Roche	6	3	6

Semifinals
4	(Australia) Roy Emerson (Australia) Rod Laver	2	6	4
1	(Australia) John Newcombe (Australia) Tony Roche	6	2	6
