= 1969 South African Open – Men's singles =

Men's singles
- 1969 South African Open

Final
- Champion: (Australia) Rod Laver
- Runner-up: (Netherlands) Tom Okker
- Score: 6–3, 10–8, 6–3

Details
- Draw: 96

Events
Singles	men	women
Doubles	men	women
- South African Open

The 1969 South African Open – Men's singles was an event of the 1969 South African Open tennis tournament and was played on outdoor hard courts at Ellis Park in Johannesburg, South Africa from 1 April until 12 April 1969. The draw consisted of 96 players and was played in a best-of-five sets format. Tom Okker was the reigning singles champion. Rod Laver won the singles title by defeating Tom Okker in the final, 6–3, 10–8, 6–3.

== Draw ==
Key

- Q = Qualifier
- WC = Wild card
- LL = Lucky loser
- Alt = Alternate
- ITF = ITF entry
- PR = Protected ranking
- SR = Special ranking
- SE = Special exempt
- JE = Junior exempt
- JR = Junior Accelerator Programme entrant
- CO = College Accelerator Programme entrant
- NG = Next Gen Accelerator Program entrant
- w/o = Walkover
- r = Retired
- d = Defaulted

=== Finals ===
Quarterfinals
(Australia) Rod Laver	6	6	6
(South Africa) Bob Hewitt	2	4	2
(United States) Pancho Gonzales	6	6	8	4	5
(South Africa) Cliff Drysdale	3	3	10	6	7
(Australia) Tony Roche	6	11	6
(South Africa) Ray Moore	3	9	3
(United States) Cliff Richey	6	3	4	6
(Netherlands) Tom Okker	3	6	6	8

Semifinals
(Australia) Rod Laver	6	1	6	6
(South Africa) Cliff Drysdale	1	6	1	2
(Australia) Tony Roche
(Netherlands) Tom Okker	w/o

Final
(Australia) Rod Laver	6	10	6
(Netherlands) Tom Okker	3	8	3

=== Top half ===
==== Section 1 ====
First Round
(South Africa) Rauty Krog	6	10	6
(South Africa) L. Badenhorst	1	8	2
(South Africa) Steve Le Roux	6	6	6
(South Africa) Nick Pretorius	4	4	4
(South Africa) Errol Sapire	6	6	6
(South Africa) Jannie De Villiers	2	2	2
(Rhodesia) Hank Irvine	6	10	6
(South Africa) John Bryant	1	8	2

Second Round
(Australia) Rod Laver	7	6	6
(South Africa) Rauty Krog	5	3	4
(South Africa) Steve Le Roux	7	4	6	3
(South Africa) Alfred Schwartz	9	6	3	6
(South Africa) Julian Krinsky	6	6	6
(South Africa) Errol Sapire	2	2	3
(Rhodesia) Hank Irvine	4	6	8	6
(South Africa) Frew McMillan	6	0	10	8

Third Round
(Australia) Rod Laver	6	6	3	6
(South Africa) Alfred Schwartz	0	3	6	1
(South Africa) Julian Krinsky	4	1	2
(South Africa) Frew McMillan	6	6	6

Fourth Round
(Australia) Rod Laver	6	6	6
(South Africa) Frew McMillan	2	4	2

==== Section 2 ====
First Round
(South Africa) Mel Baleson	6	6	6
(South Africa) Robert Morrison	4	4	4
(South Africa) Terry Rosenberg	7	6	6
(South Africa) Frank Weigelt	5	3	0
(New Zealand) Jeff Simpson	6	3	6	6
(South Africa) Lewis Sylvester	1	6	3	2
(South Africa) Peter Tudhope	6	6	6
(Australia) Alvin Gardiner	2	2	2

Second Round
(Spain) Andrés Gimeno	6	6	6
(South Africa) Mel Baleson	1	3	1
(South Africa) Terry Rosenberg	5	3	3
(South Africa) Derek Schroder	7	6	6
(South Africa) Peter Mors	6	6	4	6
(New Zealand) Jeff Simpson	2	3	6	4
(South Africa) Peter Tudhope	3	2	2
(South Africa) Bob Hewitt	6	6	6

Third Round
(Spain) Andrés Gimeno	6	6	6
(South Africa) Derek Schroder	4	2	3
(South Africa) Peter Mors	4	4	1
(South Africa) Bob Hewitt	6	6	6

Fourth Round
(Spain) Andrés Gimeno	3	4	2
(South Africa) Bob Hewitt	6	6	6

==== Section 3 ====
First Round
(South Africa) Gerrie Nel	6	6	6
(South Africa) Anthony Newnham	0	2	3
(South Africa) Lennart Ploughmann	1	6	6	3	6
(South Africa) M. Senior	6	3	3	6	3
(South Africa) George Rudman	6	6	6
(South Africa) Les Bowring	3	1	1
(South Africa) Quentin Pretorius	6	6	6
(Portugal) Alfredo Vaz-Pinto	4	4	4

Second Round
(United States) Pancho Gonzales	6	6	6
(South Africa) Gerrie Nel	0	1	2
(South Africa) Lennart Ploughmann	6	6	3	2	5
(South Africa) Albert Gaertner	4	4	6	6	7
(South Africa) Jack Saul	6	6	3	6
(South Africa) George Rudman	2	3	6	3
(South Africa) Quentin Pretorius	1	1	2
(Australia) Fred Stolle	6	6	6

Third Round
(United States) Pancho Gonzales	6	6	6
(South Africa) Albert Gaertner	4	4	1
(South Africa) Jack Saul	1	2	1
(Australia) Fred Stolle	6	6	6

Fourth Round
(United States) Pancho Gonzales	2	6	6	12	11
(Australia) Fred Stolle	6	3	4	14	9

==== Section 4 ====
First Round
(South Africa) Dennis Breetzke	6	3	4	6	6
(United States) Arnold Saul	1	6	6	4	2
(South Africa) Jeff Sacks	9	6	17
(South Africa) Stan Myerson	7	1	15
(South Africa) Sidney Gordon	6	7	6
(South Africa) Colin Zeeman	2	5	3
(Rhodesia) Roger Dowdeswell	6	6	6
(South Africa) John De St. Croix	4	1	3

Second Round
(South Africa) Bob Maud	6	6	6
(South Africa) Dennis Breetzke	0	2	3
(South Africa) Jeff Sacks	6	4	3	8
(Australia) John Brown	4	6	6	10
(South Africa) Keith Brebnor	6	6	6
(South Africa) Sidney Gordon	4	3	2
(Rhodesia) Roger Dowdeswell	4	1	2
(South Africa) Cliff Drysdale	6	6	6

Third Round
(South Africa) Bob Maud	6	6	0
(Australia) John Brown	1	2	0^{r}
(South Africa) Keith Brebnor	3	4	6
(South Africa) Cliff Drysdale	6	6	8

Fourth Round
(South Africa) Bob Maud	7	2	6	4	5
(South Africa) Cliff Drysdale	5	6	2	6	7

=== Bottom half ===
==== Section 5 ====
First Round
(South Africa) Kenny Smith	6	6	6
(South Africa) Ian Douglas Cunningham	4	2	3
(Australia) Syd Ball	6	2	6	6
(South Africa) Jeremie Malan	2	6	2	3
(South Africa) Abe Segal	6	6	6
(South Africa) Basil Wheeler	3	0	4
(South Africa) Ricky Buwalda	6	2	7	6
(Socialist Federal Republic of Yugoslavia) Tony Bowles	2	6	5	1

Second Round
(Australia) Tony Roche	6	6	6
(South Africa) Kenny Smith	2	4	2
(Australia) Syd Ball	6	1	1	2
(Zimbabwe) Andrew Pattison	3	6	6	6
(Australia) Barry Phillips-Moore	6	2	5	3
(South Africa) Abe Segal	3	6	7	6
(South Africa) Ricky Buwalda	3	4	3
(Australia) Bob Carmichael	6	6	6

Third Round
(Australia) Tony Roche	5	6	8	6
(Rhodesia) Andrew Pattison	7	3	6	2
(South Africa) Abe Segal	6	3	4	8
(Australia) Bob Carmichael	4	6	6	10

Fourth Round
(Australia) Tony Roche	7	6	7
(Australia) Bob Carmichael	5	3	5

==== Section 6 ====
First Round
(South Africa) John Yuill	7	5	6	2	6
(Australia) Anthony Hammond	5	7	3	6	0
(South Africa) Dennis Matthews	6	6	6
(South Africa) Mike Styles	3	3	3
(Australia) Peter Doerner	11	6	6
(South Africa) Paul Hartopp	9	4	3
(South Africa) Peter Gray	6	6	2	13
(South Africa) Brian Copley	2	2	6	11

Second Round
(United States) Dennis Ralston	6	6	6
(South Africa) John Yuill	2	4	4
(South Africa) Dennis Matthews	10	6	6	0	0
(South Africa) Terry Ryan	12	2	4	6	6
(South Africa) Keith Diepraam	6	8	6
(Australia) Peter Doerner	2	6	3
(South Africa) Peter Gray	2	2	4
(South Africa) Ray Moore	6	6	6

Third Round
(United States) Dennis Ralston	6	5	6	6
(South Africa) Terry Ryan	3	7	3	1
(South Africa) Keith Diepraam	3	2	7	4
(South Africa) Ray Moore	6	6	5	6

Fourth Round
(United States) Dennis Ralston	2	6	6	1
(South Africa) Ray Moore	6	4	8	6

==== Section 7 ====
First Round
(South Africa) Rohan Summers	6	6	6
(Portugal) R. De Sa Pessoa	1	1	0
(South Africa) Louis Gordon	6	6	6
(South Africa) Jan Botha	3	3	2
(South Africa) Andre Van der Merwe	6	6	6	6
(South Africa) Theo Du Plessis	3	8	4	0
(South Africa) Bokkie Niemand	6	9	6
(South Africa) Stephanus Reinach	3	7	0

Second Round
(United States) Cliff Richey	6	6	7
(South Africa) Rohan Summers	0	2	5
(South Africa) Louis Gordon	3	4	3
(South Africa) Clive Brebnor	6	6	6
(South Africa) Graydon Garner	6	6	1	6
(South Africa) Andre Van der Merwe	1	1	6	1
(South Africa) Bokkie Niemand	3	2	4
(Australia) Roy Emerson	6	6	6

Third Round
(United States) Cliff Richey	3	6	6	6
(South Africa) Clive Brebnor	6	3	1	3
(South Africa) Graydon Garner	4	0	4
(Australia) Roy Emerson	6	6	6

Fourth Round
(United States) Cliff Richey	6	6	3	6
(Australia) Roy Emerson	3	4	6	3

==== Section 8 ====
First Round
(South Africa) Gordon Forbes	7	6	6
(Australia) Alan McDonald	5	3	3
(South Africa) Byron Bertram	6	7	6
(South Africa) Jeremy Smith	3	5	2
(New Zealand) Richard Hawkes	10	6	6
(South Africa) Rayno Seegers	8	4	2
(South Africa) Bill Freer	8	6	6
(South Africa) Frank Briscoe	6	2	3

Second Round
(Australia) Dick Crealy	7	5	4	6	6
(South Africa) Gordon Forbes	5	7	6	4	1
(South Africa) Byron Bertram	2	6	3	5
(Australia) Allan Stone	6	3	6	7
(France) Jacques Thamin	1	3	0
(New Zealand) Richard Hawkes	6	6	6
(South Africa) Bill Freer	2	0	0
(Netherlands) Tom Okker	6	6	6

Third Round
(Australia) Dick Crealy	6	6	6
(Australia) Allan Stone	1	4	2
(New Zealand) Richard Hawkes	4	3	0
(Netherlands) Tom Okker	6	6	6

Fourth Round
(Australia) Dick Crealy	5	7	0
(Netherlands) Tom Okker	7	9	6
