= 1968 French Open – Men's singles qualifying =

Men's singles qualifying
- 1968 French Open

Events
Singles	men	women		boys	girls
Doubles	men	women	mixed	boys	girls
WC Singles	men	women	quad
WC Doubles	men	women	quad
Legends	−45	45+	women
French Open	· 1969 →

Players who neither had high enough rankings nor received wild cards to enter the main draw of the annual French Open Tennis Championships participated in a qualifying tournament held in the week before the event.

== Qualifiers ==
1. (France) Bernard Detroye
2. (France) Bernard Boutboul
3. (France) Patrick Proisy
4. (France) Pierre Joly
5. (Canada) Frank Tutvin
6. (United Kingdom) David Lloyd
7. (France) Jacques Thamin
8. (France) Yves Christiaen

== Qualifying draw ==
=== Key ===
- Q = Qualifier
- WC = Wild card
- LL = Lucky loser
- Alt = Alternate
- ITF = ITF entry
- PR = Protected ranking
- SR = Special ranking
- SE = Special exempt
- JE = Junior exempt
- JR = Junior Accelerator Programme entrant
- CO = College Accelerator Programme entrant
- NG = Next Gen Accelerator Program entrant
- w/o = Walkover
- r = Retired
- d = Defaulted

=== First qualifier ===
First round
1	(Argentina) Raúl Peralta	w/o
8	(France) Jean-Pierre Bombardier
4	(Australia) Doug Smith	w/o
5	(France) Jean-Louis Auget
2	(France) Michel Hervy
7	(United States) Gary Kesl	w/o
3	(France) Bernard Detroye
6	(Australia) Grant Kerr	w/o

Second round
(France) Jean-Pierre Bombardier	6	6	6
(France) Jean-Louis Auget	1	3	1
(France) Michel Hervy	4	2	2
(France) Bernard Detroye	6	6	6

Qualifying competition
(France) Jean-Pierre Bombardier	3	5^{r}
(France) Bernard Detroye	6	1

=== Second qualifier ===
First round
1	(Colombia) Gustavo Castillo	w/o
8	(France) Thierry Bernasconi
4	(Mexico) Jaime Subirats	w/o
5	(France) Bernard Boutboul
2	(France) Bertrand Dufour	3	3	6	11	1^{r}
7	(France) Patrice Duhamel	6	6	4	9	5
3	(France) Éric Derasse
6	(Australia) Brian White	w/o

Second round
(France) Thierry Bernasconi	6	1	0	2
(France) Bernard Boutboul	4	6	6	6
(France) Patrice Duhamel	5	6	6	6
(France) Éric Derasse	7	3	4	2

Qualifying competition
(France) Bernard Boutboul	6	6	6
(France) Patrice Duhamel	1	4	1

=== Third qualifier ===
First round
1	(United States) Eugene Cantin	1	1	6
8	(France) Alain Cassaigne	6	6	8
4	(Italy) Massimo Di Domenico	w/o
5	(France) François Matheu
2	(France) Pierre Loizeau	6	6	6
7	(Australia) Eugene McCabe	4	1	3
3	(France) Patrick Proisy
6	(Algeria) M. Mannoubi	w/o

Second round
(France) Alain Cassaigne	4	5	0
(France) François Matheu	6	7	6
(France) Pierre Loizeau	5	1	1
(France) Patrick Proisy	7	6	6

Qualifying competition
(France) François Matheu	0	2	4
(France) Patrick Proisy	6	6	6

=== Fourth qualifier ===
First round
1	(Australia) Lindsay Straney	w/o
8	(France) Pierre Joly
4	(Colombia) Francisco Castillo
5	(France) Jean-Claude Fauvet	w/o
2	(France) Paul Desq	w/o
7	(United States) John Norgauer
3	(France) Marc Boulle
6	(Australia) Ian Fletcher	w/o

Second round
(France) Pierre Joly	4	6	6	9
(Colombia) Francisco Castillo	6	4	3	7
(United States) John Norgauer	4	3	4
(France) Marc Boulle	6	6	6

Qualifying competition
(France) Pierre Joly	4	4	6	6	6
(France) Marc Boulle	6	6	2	3	4

=== Fifth qualifier ===
First round
1	(Peru) Tomás González
8	(Uruguay) Eduardo Argon	w/o
4	(Canada) Frank Tutvin	6	6	6
5	(France) François Battegay	2	3	2
2	(France) Denis Grozdanovitch	6	6	6
7	(France) Jean-Louis Coindet	2	2	4
3	(France) Jean-Pierre Cartier
6	(Colombia) Álvaro Peña	w/o

Second round
(Peru) Tomás González	2	5	2
(Canada) Frank Tutvin	6	7	6
(France) Denis Grozdanovitch	3	4	6	5
(France) Jean-Pierre Cartier	6	6	4	7

Qualifying competition
(Canada) Frank Tutvin	7	6	7
(France) Jean-Pierre Cartier	5	3	5

=== Sixth qualifier ===
First round
1	(Australia) R. Sutton	3	0	0
8	(France) Alain Bouteleux	6	6	6
4	(Canada) Peter Burwash	w/o
5	(France) Marc Ungerer
2	(France) Michel Bergès
7	(Italy) Piero Toci	w/o
3	(France) Sampiero Gavini	w/o
6	(United Kingdom) David Lloyd

Second round
(France) Alain Bouteleux	6	6	3	4	1
(France) Marc Ungerer	2	4	6	6	6
(France) Michel Bergès	3	6	6	5	4
(United Kingdom) David Lloyd	6	3	4	7	6

Qualifying competition
(France) Marc Ungerer	1	5^{r}
(United Kingdom) David Lloyd	6	6

=== Seventh qualifier ===
First round
1	(Australia) Jim Moore	w/o
8	(France) Jacques Thamin
4	(South Africa) Quentin Pretorius	w/o
5	(France) Henri Pellizza
2	(France) Wanaro N'Godrella
7	(France) Jean-Noël Grinda	w/o
3	(France) Paul Jalabert
6	(Brazil) Fernando Gentil	w/o

Second round
(France) Jacques Thamin	7	6	6
(France) Henri Pellizza	5	4	0
(France) Wanaro N'Godrella
(France) Paul Jalabert	w/o

Qualifying competition
(France) Jacques Thamin	6	6	6
(France) Wanaro N'Godrella	1	4	3

=== Eighth qualifier ===
First round
1	(Peru) Alfredo Acuna	w/o
8	(France) Bruno Vallée
4	(Morocco) Mousthacine Taibi	2	4	6	3
5	(France) Jean-Paul Meyer	6	6	2	6
2	(France) Pierre Rinderknecht	w/o
7	(France) Patrick Béraud
3	(France) Philippe Pimpaneau	0	2	3
6	(France) Yves Christiaen	6	6	6

Second round
(France) Bruno Vallée	6	3	4	8	4
(France) Jean-Paul Meyer	2	6	6	6	6
(France) Patrick Béraud	2	1	0
(France) Yves Christiaen	6	6	6

Qualifying competition
(France) Jean-Paul Meyer	3	2	3
(France) Yves Christiaen	6	6	6
