= 1970 French Open – Men's singles =

Men's singles
- 1970 French Open

Final
- Champion: (Czechoslovakia) Jan Kodeš
- Runner-up: (Socialist Federal Republic of Yugoslavia) Željko Franulović
- Score: 6–2, 6–4, 6–0

Details
- Draw: 128
- Seeds: 16

Events
Singles	men	women		boys	girls
Doubles	men	women	mixed	boys	girls
WC Singles	men	women	quad
WC Doubles	men	women	quad
Legends	−45	45+	women
- French Open

Jan Kodeš defeated Željko Franulović in the final, 6–2, 6–4, 6–0 to win the men's singles tennis title at the 1970 French Open. It was his first major singles title, becoming the first Czechoslovak to win a singles major.

Rod Laver was the reigning champion, but did not compete this year.

== Seeds ==
The seeded players are listed below. Jan Kodeš is the champion; others show the round in which they were eliminated.

1. (Romania) Ilie Năstase (quarterfinals)
2. (United States) Stan Smith (first round)
3. (Spain) Manuel Santana (fourth round)
4. (United States) Arthur Ashe (quarterfinals)
5. (Socialist Federal Republic of Yugoslavia) Željko Franulović (final)
6. (South Africa) Bob Hewitt (second round)
7. (Czechoslovakia) Jan Kodeš (champion)
8. (United States) Cliff Richey (semifinals)
9. (Soviet Union) Alex Metreveli (fourth round)
10. (Romania) Ion Țiriac (fourth round)
11. (France) François Jauffret (quarterfinals)
12. (Australia) Lew Hoad (fourth round)
13. (Spain) Manuel Orantes (fourth round)
14. (France) Georges Goven (semifinals)
15. (Australia) Ray Ruffels (third round)
16. (Australia) Dick Crealy (fourth round)

== Draw ==
=== Key ===
- Q = Qualifier
- WC = Wild card
- LL = Lucky loser
- r = Retired

=== Finals ===
Quarterfinals
(Italy) Martin Mulligan	1	3	5
7	(Czechoslovakia) Jan Kodeš	6	6	7
14	(France) Georges Goven	8	6	6	6
11	(France) François Jauffret	6	8	2	1
5	(Socialist Federal Republic of Yugoslavia) Željko Franulović	6	3	10	4	6
4	(United States) Arthur Ashe	3	6	8	6	3
8	(United States) Cliff Richey	7	9	4	6
1	(Romania) Ilie Năstase	5	7	6	3

Semifinals
7	(Czechoslovakia) Jan Kodeš	2	6	5	6	6
14	(France) Georges Goven	6	2	7	2	3
5	(Socialist Federal Republic of Yugoslavia) Željko Franulović	6	4	1	7	7
8	(United States) Cliff Richey	4	6	6	5	5

Final
7	(Czechoslovakia) Jan Kodeš	6	6	6
5	(Socialist Federal Republic of Yugoslavia) Željko Franulović	2	4	0

=== Top half ===
==== Section 1 ====
First round
2	(United States) S Smith	w/o
Q	(France) JP Meyer
(Hungary) P Szőke	4	6	5	6	6
(Socialist Federal Republic of Yugoslavia) B Jovanović	6	4	7	4	3
(Chile) J Fillol Sr.	3	7	2	6	6
(Italy) S Palmieri	6	5	6	0	3
(Switzerland) D Sturdza	2	1	2
(Australia) T Addison	6	6	6
15	(Australia) R Ruffels	6	6	6
Q	(France) P Joly	2	2	2
(Chile) P Cornejo	6	6	1	3	6
(South Africa) K Diepraam	3	3	6	6	2
(Ecuador) P Guzmán	w/o
(United States) T Gorman
(United States) B Seewagen	7	0	1
(Italy) M Mulligan	9	6	6

Second round
Q	(France) JP Meyer	1	2	4
(Hungary) P Szőke	6	6	6
(Chile) J Fillol Sr.	3	1	6	6	10
(Australia) T Addison	6	6	3	4	8
15	(Australia) R Ruffels	7	6	6
(Chile) P Cornejo	5	4	2
(United States) T Gorman	4	3	3
(Italy) M Mulligan	6	6	6

Third round
(Hungary) P Szőke	2	3	9
(Chile) J Fillol Sr.	6	6	11
15	(Australia) R Ruffels	9	3	6	0
(Italy) M Mulligan	11	6	1	6

Round four
(Chile) J Fillol Sr.	4	7	6	5	6
(Italy) M Mulligan	6	5	3	7	8

==== Section 2 ====
First round
7	(Czechoslovakia) J Kodeš	6	6	6
(France) JB Chanfreau	0	1	3
Q	(Australia) R Howe	6	8	6	8
(United States) J Osborne	1	10	2	6
(Austria) H Kary
(New Zealand) O Parun	w/o
(Czechoslovakia) Š Koudelka	6	6	6
Q	(United States) D O'Bryant	1	1	2
10	(Romania) I Țiriac	6	6	6
(France) J-P Courcol	1	0	4
(Italy) E Di Matteo	3	6	6	6
(South Africa) A Segal	6	0	1	1
(Australia) B Carmichael	6	3	3	6	6
(India) J Mukerjea	4	6	6	3	2
Q	(France) F Matheu	3	2	7	4
(United Kingdom) G Battrick	6	6	5	6

Second round
7	(Czechoslovakia) J Kodeš	6	6	6
Q	(Australia) R Howe	4	1	2
(Austria) H Kary	w/o
(Czechoslovakia) Š Koudelka
10	(Romania) I Țiriac	6	2	7	6
(Italy) E Di Matteo	4	6	5	1
(Australia) B Carmichael	3	2	4
(United Kingdom) G Battrick	6	6	6

Third round
7	(Czechoslovakia) J Kodeš	6	6	6
(Czechoslovakia) Š Koudelka	0	1	2
10	(Romania) I Țiriac	6	9	6
(United Kingdom) G Battrick	2	7	3

Round four
7	(Czechoslovakia) J Kodeš	4	7	4	6	6
10	(Romania) I Țiriac	6	5	6	2	2

==== Section 3 ====
First round
3	(Spain) M Santana	6	6	6
(France) D Contet	2	1	1
(Australia) P Kronk	4	2	3
(United States) J McManus	6	6	6
(West Germany) J Fassbender	3	7	3	5
(United States) B MacKay	6	5	6	7
(Belgium) C De Gronckel	4	1	1
(Hungary) S Baranyi	6	6	6
14	(France) G Goven	6	6	6
(Australia) C Dibley	2	3	2
(West Germany) H-J Plötz	6	5	6	3	6
(United Kingdom) S Matthews	2	7	2	6	3
(Romania) P Mărmureanu	6	6	6
(Australia) R Keldie	3	3	2
(Sweden) H Zahr	4	3	4
(West Germany) I Buding	6	6	6

Second round
3	(Spain) M Santana	6	6	7
(United States) J McManus	1	2	5
(United States) B MacKay	2	6	10	2	1
(Hungary) S Baranyi	6	2	8	6	6
14	(France) G Goven	6	6	6
(West Germany) H-J Plötz	3	2	0
(Romania) P Mărmureanu	7	13	6
(West Germany) I Buding	5	11	2

Third round
3	(Spain) M Santana	2	6	6	6
(Hungary) S Baranyi	6	3	4	3
14	(France) G Goven	7	8	6
(Romania) P Mărmureanu	5	6	3

Round four
3	(Spain) M Santana	6	4	3	6	0
14	(France) G Goven	3	6	6	1	6

==== Section 4 ====
First round
6	(South Africa) B Hewitt	6	7	6
(United Kingdom) D Lloyd	2	5	3
(Italy) P Marzano	4	6	2	5
(Czechoslovakia) V Zednik	6	4	6	7
(Australia) B Phillips-Moore	6	6	6
Q	(France) W N'Godrella	1	0	3
(Italy) A Panatta	2	4	6	6	6
(Australia) J Alexander	6	6	3	2	4
11	(France) F Jauffret	7	6	6
(Japan) K Watanabe	5	3	1
(Soviet Union) A Volkov	4	4	7
(France) P Beust	6	6	9
LL	(Australia) G Perkins	6	6	4	3	5
(South Africa) T Ryan	2	2	6	6	7
(Australia) P Dent
(Spain) JL Arilla	w/o

Second round
6	(South Africa) B Hewitt	8	3	4	8	4
(Czechoslovakia) V Zednik	6	6	6	6	6
(Australia) B Phillips-Moore	5	6	0	6	10
(Italy) A Panatta	7	1	6	2	12
11	(France) F Jauffret	6	1	6	6
(France) P Beust	2	6	1	1
(South Africa) T Ryan	1	2	3
(Australia) P Dent	6	6	6

Third round
(Czechoslovakia) V Zednik	4	7	6	3	r.
(Italy) A Panatta	6	9	3	4
11	(France) F Jauffret	6	5	7	6
(Australia) P Dent	1	7	5	3

Round four
(Italy) A Panatta	3	4	0
11	(France) F Jauffret	6	6	6

=== Bottom half ===
==== Section 5 ====
First round
(Colombia) W Álvarez	6	3	2	1
(Czechoslovakia) J Kukal	4	6	6	6
(France) JL Rouyer	7	4	2	7	6
(Chile) J Pinto Bravo	5	6	6	5	4
Q	(France) C Duxin	4	6	2	0
(United States) C Pasarell	6	3	6	6
(West Germany) H Elschenbroich	6	3	6	3	5
12	(Australia) L Hoad	2	6	4	6	7
(West Germany) K Meiler	w/o
(Soviet Union) T Kakoulia
(Australia) J Bartlett	6	2	2	6	3
(Mexico) J Loyo-Mayo	3	6	6	3	6
(Australia) P Doerner	6	4	6	3
(Poland) W Gasiorek	8	6	2	6
(United States) R Barth	3	4	3
5	(Socialist Federal Republic of Yugoslavia) Z Franulović	6	6	6

Second round
(Czechoslovakia) J Kukal	6	6	1	4
(France) JL Rouyer	2	8	6	6
(United States) C Pasarell	4	6	4	4
12	(Australia) L Hoad	6	3	6	6
(Soviet Union) T Kakoulia	6	2	6	0	4
(Mexico) J Loyo-Mayo	3	6	2	6	6
(Poland) W Gasiorek	1	2	6	8	7
5	(Socialist Federal Republic of Yugoslavia) Z Franulović	6	6	4	6	9

Third round
(France) JL Rouyer	4	5	4
12	(Australia) L Hoad	6	7	6
(Mexico) J Loyo-Mayo	1	2	2
5	(Socialist Federal Republic of Yugoslavia) Z Franulović	6	6	6

Round four
12	(Australia) L Hoad	3	3	4
5	(Socialist Federal Republic of Yugoslavia) Z Franulović	6	6	6

==== Section 6 ====
First round
Q	(South Africa) J Krinsky	5	9	3	6	4
(France) B Montrenaud	7	7	6	1	6
(Australia) A Stone	7	6	6
(Rhodesia) A Pattison	5	4	3
(Spain) J Gisbert Sr	6	6	5	1	6
(France) JC Barclay	3	3	7	6	1
(Brazil) J Mandarino	3	7	2	1
13	(Spain) M Orantes	6	5	6	6
(Italy) N Pietrangeli	5	6	6	6
(Soviet Union) S Likhachev	7	1	3	1
Q	(France) J Lovera	0	0	4
(Belgium) P Hombergen	6	6	6
(United Kingdom) K Wooldridge	6	2	9
Q	(South Africa) W Freer	8	6	11
(Poland) M Rybarczyk	0	2	0
4	(United States) A Ashe	6	6	6

Second round
(France) B Montrenaud	4	12	6	3	2
(Australia) A Stone	6	10	2	6	6
(Spain) J Gisbert Sr	2	4	3
13	(Spain) M Orantes	6	6	6
(Italy) N Pietrangeli	1	6	6	6
(Belgium) P Hombergen	6	1	3	2
Q	(South Africa) W Freer	1	0	3
4	(United States) A Ashe	6	6	6

Third round
(Australia) A Stone	3	3	0
13	(Spain) M Orantes	6	6	6
(Italy) N Pietrangeli	6	4	4
4	(United States) A Ashe	8	6	6

Round four
13	(Spain) M Orantes	6	4	2	2
4	(United States) A Ashe	3	6	6	6

==== Section 7 ====
First round
(Poland) T Nowicki	6	6	6
(Greece) N Kalogeropoulos	3	3	4
(Czechoslovakia) F Pála	6	7	6
(South Africa) R Seegers	1	5	2
(Australia) G Masters	6	3	3	6	6
(Austria) P Pokorny	1	6	6	2	1
(Italy) M Di Domenico	4	1	6
9	(Soviet Union) A Metreveli	6	6	8
Q	(Ecuador) E Zuleta	6	8	6
(Portugal) R Peralta	3	6	3
(Chile) P Rodríguez	6	7	2	6
(Italy) F Bartoni	2	5	6	3
(South Africa) D Schroder	6	6	6
LL	(Australia) R Rheinberger	2	4	0
Q	(France) J Thamin	0	1	4
8	(United States) C Richey	6	6	6

Second round
(Poland) T Nowicki	1	2	1
(Czechoslovakia) F Pála	6	6	6
(Australia) G Masters	5	3	2
9	(Soviet Union) A Metreveli	7	6	6
Q	(Ecuador) E Zuleta	2	6	3
(Chile) P Rodríguez	6	8	6
(South Africa) D Schroder	2	2	4
8	(United States) C Richey	6	6	6

Third round
(Czechoslovakia) F Pála	4	2	9	6	1
9	(Soviet Union) A Metreveli	6	6	7	4	6
(Chile) P Rodríguez	2	2	0
8	(United States) C Richey	6	6	6

Round four
9	(Soviet Union) A Metreveli	6	4	6
8	(United States) C Richey	8	6	8

==== Section 8 ====
First round
(Italy) E Castigliano	1	4	6	2
(Socialist Federal Republic of Yugoslavia) N Špear	6	6	3	6
Q	(France) J-F Caujolle	3	7	0
(Belgium) E Drossart	6	9	6
Q	(Japan) J Kuki	4	6	3	3
(Hungary) I Gulyás	6	2	6	6
(Spain) A Muñoz	2	6	4	4
16	(Australia) D Crealy	6	3	6	6
Q	(Jamaica) R Russell	3	7	4	6	4
(West Germany) HJ Pohmann	6	5	6	3	6
Q	(Hungary) R Machán	6	1	2	4
(France) M Leclercq	4	6	6	6
(Australia) I Fletcher	5	6	6	1	6
(Hungary) G Varga	7	2	1	6	4
(France) P Proisy	5	3	2
1	(Romania) I Năstase	7	6	6

Second round
(Socialist Federal Republic of Yugoslavia) N Špear	6	6	6
(Belgium) E Drossart	2	4	2
(Hungary) I Gulyás	7	1	7	8	3
16	(Australia) D Crealy	9	6	5	6	6
(West Germany) HJ Pohmann	3	6	2	3
(France) M Leclercq	6	2	6	6
(Australia) I Fletcher	0	1	0
1	(Romania) I Năstase	6	6	6

Third round
(Socialist Federal Republic of Yugoslavia) N Špear	4	6	1	1
16	(Australia) D Crealy	6	1	6	6
(France) M Leclercq	2	1	4
1	(Romania) I Năstase	6	6	6

Round four
16	(Australia) D Crealy	4	3	4
1	(Romania) I Năstase	6	6	6

Preceded by 1970 Australian Open – Men's singles	Grand Slam men's singles	Succeeded by 1970 Wimbledon Championships – Men's singles
