= 1969 South African Open (tennis) =

- Date: 1–12 April
- Edition: 66th
- Category: Independent
- Draw: 128S / 64D
- Prize money: $30,000
- Surface: Hard / outdoor
- Location: Johannesburg, South Africa
- Venue: Ellis Park Tennis Stadium

Champions

Men's singles
- (Australia) Rod Laver

Women's singles
- (United States) Billie Jean King

Men's doubles
- (United States) Pancho Gonzales / (South Africa) Ray Moore

Women's doubles
- (France) Françoise Dürr / (United Kingdom) Ann Jones

Mixed doubles
- (Netherlands) Tom Okker / (South Africa) Annette Van Zyl
- South African Open

The 1969 South African Open was an independent combined men's and women's tennis tournament played on outdoor hard courts at Ellis Park in Johannesburg, South Africa. It was the 66th edition of the tournament and was held from 1 April through 12 April 1969. Rod Laver won the singles title in the men's division, while Billie Jean King won the singles titles in the women's.

== Finals ==
=== Men's singles ===
(Australia) Rod Laver defeated (Netherlands) Tom Okker 6–3, 10–8, 6–3

=== Women's singles ===
(United States) Billie Jean King defeated (United States) Nancy Richey 6–3, 6–4

=== Men's doubles ===
(United States) Pancho Gonzales / (South Africa) Ray Moore defeated (South Africa) Bob Hewitt / (South Africa) Frew McMillan 6–3, 4–6, 6–1, 6–3

=== Women's doubles ===
(France) Françoise Dürr / (United Kingdom) Ann Jones defeated (United States) Nancy Richey / (United Kingdom) Virginia Wade 6–2, 3–6, 6–4

=== Mixed doubles ===
(Netherlands) Tom Okker / (South Africa) Annette Van Zyl defeated (South Africa) Bob Maud / (United Kingdom) Virginia Wade 8–6, 5–7, 6–4
