= Felix Ponte =

Peruvian-American tennis player

- Country (sports): Peru
- Height: 5 ft 5 in (165 cm)

Singles
- Career record: 2–14
- Highest ranking: No. 174 (Sep 27, 1974)

Grand Slam singles results
- Australian Open: 1R (1974)
- Wimbledon: Q1 (1970)
- US Open: 2R (1965)

Doubles
- Career record: 3–12

Grand Slam doubles results
- French Open: 2R (1970)
- US Open: 2R (1973)

Felix Ponte is a Peruvian-American former professional tennis player.

Raised in Lima, Ponte was a top ranked Peruvian junior and attended high school in Chicago.

After being drafted into the U.S. Army he was stationed at Dugway Proving Ground and during this time met Brigham Young University head coach Wayne Pearce, who recruited him to the team,. His quickness on court earned him the nickname "The Cat" from his BYU teammates and he was with the squad from 1970 to 1972.

Ponte featured on the professional tennis tour in the 1970s and registered a best singles world ranking of 174.
