= Danny O'Bryant =

American tennis player

- Country (sports): United States
- Height: 6 ft 3 in (191 cm)

Singles
- Career record: 6–22

Grand Slam singles results
- French Open: 1R (1970)
- Wimbledon: Q3 (1970)
- US Open: 2R (1968)

Doubles
- Career record: 2–5

Grand Slam doubles results
- French Open: 3R (1970)
- US Open: 1R (1972)

Danny O'Bryant is an American former professional tennis player.

A native of Texas, O'Bryant attended Sabinal High School and was a three-time UIL Class A singles champion, as well as an All-Star state high school basketball player.

O'Bryant played varsity tennis for Trinity University, earning All-American honors in 1969 after reaching the NCAA singles quarter-finals and doubles semi-finals. Graduating that year, he then turned professional and during his time on tour made the main draw of the French Open. He had a career win over Australian Davis Cup player Dick Crealy.
