= 1971 Italian Open (tennis) =

- Date: 3–10 May
- Edition: 28th
- Category: WCT / Non-tour
- Surface: Clay court / outdoor
- Location: Rome, Italy
- Venue: Foro Italico

Champions

Men's singles
- (Australia) Rod Laver

Women's singles
- (United Kingdom) Virginia Wade

Men's doubles
- (Australia) John Newcombe / (Australia) Tony Roche

Women's doubles
- (United Kingdom) Virginia Wade / (West Germany) Helga Masthoff
| ← 1970 · | Italian Open | · 1972 → |

The 1971 Italian Open was a combined men's and women's tennis tournament that was played by men on outdoor clay courts at the Foro Italico in Rome, Italy. The men's tournament was part of the World Championship Tennis circuit while the women's tournament was a non-tour event, i.e. not part of the Grand Prix or Virginia Slims circuit. The tournament was held from 3 May through 10 May 1971. The singles titles were won by Rod Laver and Virginia Wade.

== Finals ==
=== Men's singles ===
(Australia) Rod Laver defeated (Czechoslovakia) Jan Kodeš 7–5, 6–3, 6–3

=== Women's singles ===
(United Kingdom) Virginia Wade defeated (West Germany) Helga Masthoff 6–4, 6–4

=== Men's doubles ===
(Australia) John Newcombe / (Australia) Tony Roche defeated (Spain) Andrés Gimeno / (United Kingdom) Roger Taylor 6–4, 6–4

=== Women's doubles ===
(United Kingdom) Virginia Wade / (West Germany) Helga Masthoff defeated (Australia) Lesley Turner Bowrey / (Australia) Helen Gourlay 5–7, 6–2, 6–2
