= Erwin Lange =

German politician (1914–1991)

Member of the Bundestag
- In office 7 September 1949 – 1980

Member of the European Parliament
- In office 21 January 1970 – 23 July 1984
- Constituency: Germany

Personal details
- Born: 10 May 1914 Essen, German Empire
- Died: 30 October 1991 (aged 77) Essen, Germany
- Party: Social Democratic Party
- Occupation: Typesetter, printing works manager, politician

Erwin Lange (10 May 1914 – 30 October 1991) was a German politician of the Social Democratic Party (SPD). He was a member of the Bundestag from 1949 to 1980 and in the European Parliament from 1970 to 1984. In the European Parliament he chaired the economic committee and the budget committee. In 1937 a Nazi court convicted him of preparing high treason.

== Early life ==
Lange was born in Essen and was a Protestant. He left Mittelschule and started a commercial apprenticeship in 1930, then switched in 1931 to an apprenticeship as a typesetter. He joined the socialist youth movement in 1928 and the trade union movement in 1930.

== Persecution and war ==
Lange was arrested by the Nazi authorities in 1936 for political reasons. In 1937 he was convicted of preparing to commit high treason and sentenced to three and a half years in a penitentiary (Zuchthaus) and three years' loss of civil honour rights. After the sentence he did labour on moorland, was held in protective custody and was placed under police supervision. He is among the members profiled in Olaf Ihlau's 1969 study of the Rote Kämpfer (Red Fighters), a council communist resistance group broken up by the Gestapo in 1936–37.

In autumn 1942 Lange was conscripted into the punishment unit 999 and sent to Africa. He was taken prisoner by American forces in 1943 and released in 1946.

== Political career ==
After the war Lange passed the master's examination in his trade in 1947 and became manager of a printing company in Essen. In the SPD he belonged to the Essen sub-district (Unterbezirk) and chaired the Niederrhein Bezirk.

=== Member of the Bundestag ===
Lange was elected to the first Bundestag at the 1949 federal election and sat through the eighth legislative term, which ended in 1980. Until 1969 he was on the executive committee of the SPD parliamentary group.

=== Member of the European Parliament ===
Lange sat in the European Parliament from 21 January 1970 to 23 July 1984. He chaired the economic committee until 1975 and then the budget committee. From 17 July 1979 to 23 July 1984 he was a member of the Socialist Group in the first directly elected Parliament, and from 20 July 1979 he chaired the Committee on Budgets. On 11 April 1983 he joined the delegation for relations with the United States.

== Death ==
Lange died in Essen on 30 October 1991.
