= Bernard Paul (tennis) =

French tennis player (born 1944)

- Country (sports): France
- Born: 13 April 1944 (age 81)

Singles
- Career record: 10–23

Grand Slam singles results
- Australian Open: 1R (1970)
- French Open: 1R (1965, 66, 67, 68, 69, 71)
- Wimbledon: 1R (1966)

Doubles
- Career record: 13–17

Grand Slam doubles results
- French Open: 3R (1969, 1970)
- Wimbledon: 2R (1967)

Bernard Paul (born 13 April 1944) is a French former professional tennis player.

Active in the 1960s and 1970s, Paul was ranked amongst the French top-10 at his peak. His best results in grand slam tournaments came in doubles, twice reaching the men's doubles third round at Roland Garros.
