= Mieczysław Rybarczyk =

Polish tennis player

- Country (sports): Poland
- Born: 1 September 1941 Warsaw, General Government
- Died: 29 July 1983 (aged 41) Vienna, Austria

Singles
- Career record: 0–5
- Highest ranking: No. 273 (3 June 1974)

Grand Slam singles results
- French Open: 1R (1964, 1969, 1970, 1973)
- Wimbledon: Q2 (1970)

Doubles
- Career record: 0–4

Grand Slam doubles results
- French Open: 2R (1969, 1970)
- Wimbledon: 2R (1969)

Grand Slam mixed doubles results
- French Open: 1R (1969, 1970)

Mieczysław Rybarczyk (1 September 1941 – 29 July 1983) was a Polish professional tennis player.

Born in Warsaw, Rybarczyk was a member of the Poland Davis Cup team between 1965 and 1970, winning four singles and one doubles rubber. He won two singles rubbers in Poland's 3–2 triumph against Hungary in 1969, when he got the better of István Gulyás and Péter Szőke.

Rybarczyk played in the main draws of both the French Open and Wimbledon during his career. This includes a first round loss to Arthur Ashe at the 1970 French Open.

== See also ==
- List of Poland Davis Cup team representatives
