= Eduardo Gorostiaga =

Bolivian tennis player

- Full name: Eduardo Gorostiaga Alcoreza
- Country (sports): Bolivia
- Born: 22 May 1945 (age 81) La Paz, Bolivia
- Turned pro: 1969 (amateur from 1963)
- Retired: 1980

Singles
- Career record: 51–95
- Career titles: 3
- Highest ranking: No. 288 (12 December 1976)

Grand Slam singles results
- French Open: Q3 (1970)
- Wimbledon: Q2 (1969)

Doubles
- Career record: 2–11

Grand Slam doubles results
- French Open: 2R (1968, 1969, 1970)
- Wimbledon: 1R (1973)

Grand Slam mixed doubles results
- French Open: 2R (1970)

Eduardo Gorostiaga Alcoreza (Note: In this Spanish name, the first or paternal surname is Gorostiaga and the second or maternal family name is Alcoreza.) (born 22 May 1945) is a Bolivian former professional tennis player.

Born in La Paz, Gorostiaga goes by his nickname "Pacho" and is the son of national champion Issac, who was later an influential tennis administrator.

Gorostiaga, who competed on the international tour in the 1960s and 1970s, was along with his sometimes doubles teammate Ramiro Benavides one of the two pre-eminent Bolivian players of this era. Despite this he only appeared in one Davis Cup tie for Bolivia, against Brazil in São Paulo in the 1975 tournament.

During his career he featured in the main draws of the French Open and Wimbledon.

His career singles titles highlights include winning the Bolivian National Championships in 1964, the Suvretta T.C. International in St. Moritz in 1968 and the Mediterranean T.C. International held in Nice in 1969.
