= Petre Mărmureanu =

Romanian-American tennis player

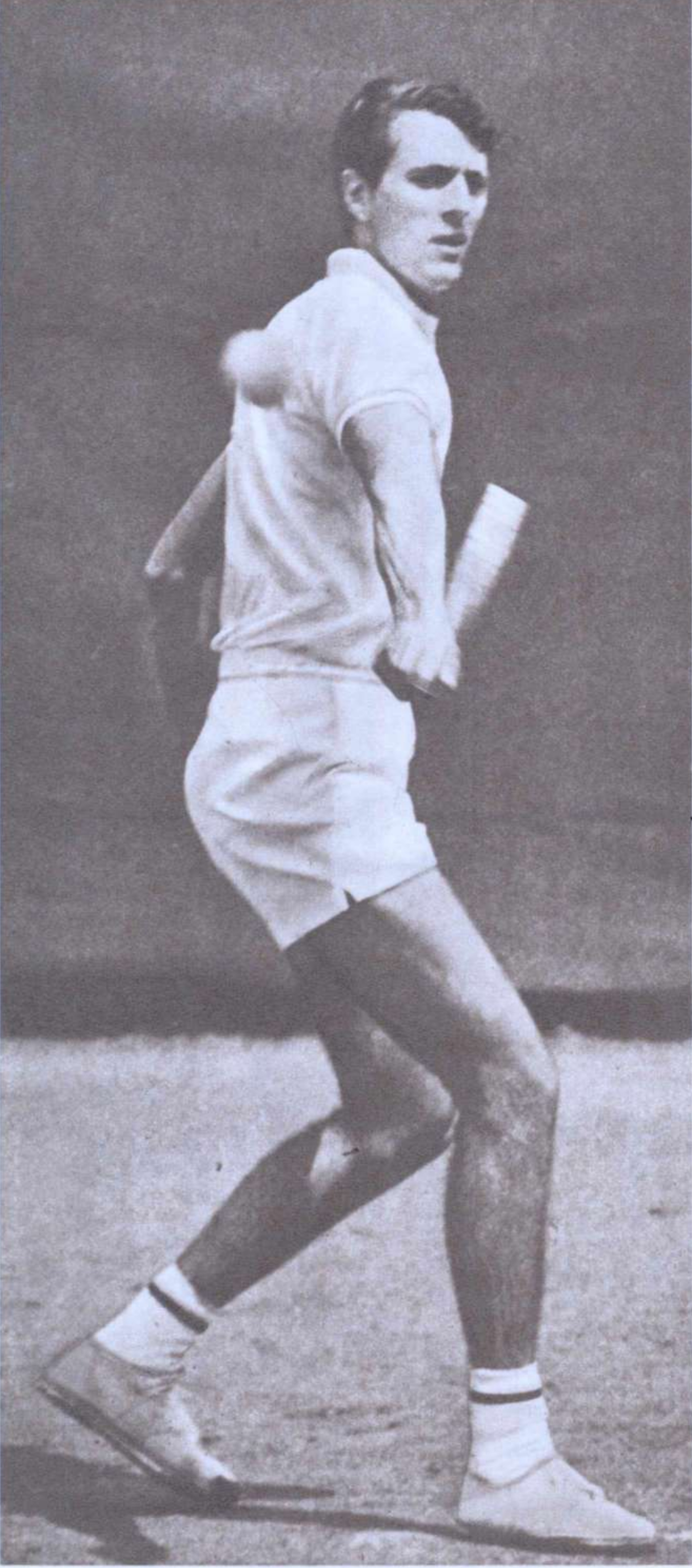
- Country (sports): Romania
- Born: 20 June 1941 (age 84)

Singles
- Career record: 13–15

Grand Slam singles results
- French Open: 3R (1968, 1969, 1970)
- Wimbledon: 1R (1970, 1971, 1972)
- US Open: 2R (1969)

Doubles
- Career record: 5–9

Grand Slam doubles results
- French Open: QF (1972)
- Wimbledon: 1R (1971, 1972)
- US Open: 1R (1969)
Medal record
Representing Romania
Summer Universiade
Bronze medal – third place	1965 Budapest	Men's doubles

Petre Mărmureanu (born 20 June 1941) is a Romanian-American former professional tennis player.

Mărmureanu played for the Romania Davis Cup team in 1962 and 1963, then from 1969 to 1972. His second stint in the team included three runner-up finishes, where he was the team's reserve to the preferred combination of Ilie Năstase and Ion Țiriac. He made the singles third round of the French Open on three occasions and was a men's doubles quarter-finalist in 1972 with Barry Phillips-Moore.

In 1975 he defected to the United States and later served as a coach on the U.S. Federation Cup team.

== See also ==
- List of Romania Davis Cup team representatives
