= Eugenio Castigliano =

Italian tennis player

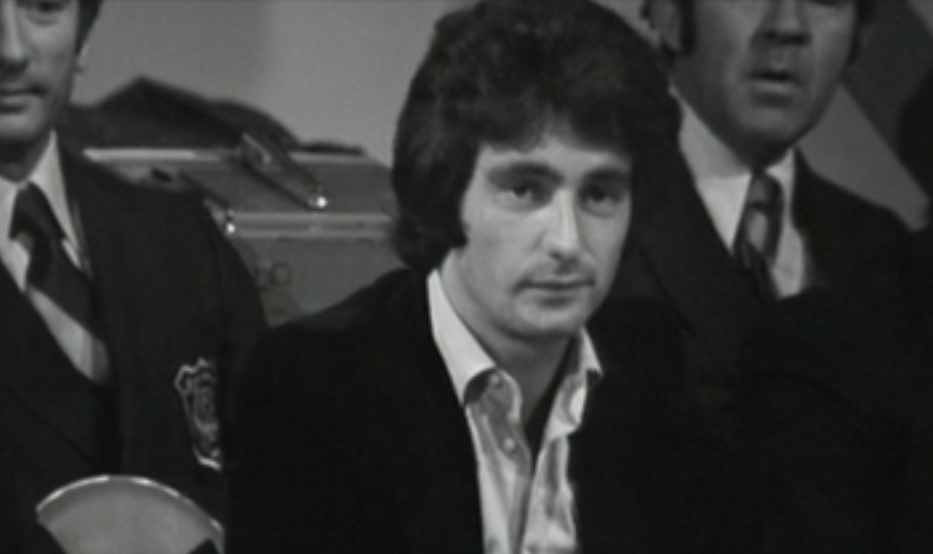
- Country (sports): Italy
- Born: 6 February 1946 Rome, Italy
- Died: 2 April 2012 (aged 66)

Singles
- Career record: 13–18

Grand Slam singles results
- French Open: 1R (1969, 1970)
- Wimbledon: 1R (1969)

Doubles
- Career record: 3–9

Grand Slam doubles results
- French Open: 3R (1969)

Eugenio Castigliano (6 February 1946 – 2 April 2012) was an Italian professional tennis player.

Castigliano, a native of Rome who was active in the 1960s and 1970s, featured in main draws at the French Open and Wimbledon. He made the round of 16 at the 1968 Italian Open, which included a five set win over Georges Goven. At the 1968 Summer Olympics in Mexico City he featured in the demonstration event for tennis. He was a Davis Cup representative for Italy in 1968 and 1969, registering five singles wins.

== See also ==
- List of Italy Davis Cup team representatives
