= Michel Leclercq (tennis) =

French tennis player

- Country (sports): France
- Born: 12 October 1940 (age 84)
- Plays: Left-handed

Singles

Grand Slam singles results
- French Open: 3R (1970)
- Wimbledon: 2R (1965, 1967)

Michel Leclercq (born 12 October 1940) is a French former professional tennis player.

A left-handed player from Beauvais, Leclercq began touring in the 1960s and made regular appearances at the French Championships. In the 1967 French Championships he played in the longest set in Roland Garros history, which he lost 19–21 to Gaetano Di Maso. He reached the third round of the 1970 French Open, with wins over Róbert Machán and Hans-Jürgen Pohmann, before falling to top seed Ilie Năstase. During his career he also competed at Wimbledon and was a Davis Cup squad member for France.
