= Julian Krinsky =

South African tennis player

- Country (sports): South Africa

Singles
- Career record: 13–13

Grand Slam singles results
- French Open: 1R (1970)
- Wimbledon: 1R (1969)
Medal record
Maccabiah Games
Silver medal – second place	1969 Tel Aviv	Men's tennis doubles
Bronze medal – third place	1969 Tel Aviv	Men's tennis singles
Bronze medal – third place	1973 Tel Aviv	Men's tennis doubles
Silver medal – second place	1981 Tel Aviv	Men's squash singles

Julian Krinsky is an American, former South African, professional tennis and squash player. He won medals in tennis at the 1969 Maccabiah Games and the 1973 Maccabiah Games in Israel, and competed at the French Open and Wimbledon. He won a silver medal for the United States in squash in the 1981 Maccabiah Games.

== Biography ==
Originally from Johannesburg, Krinsky immigrated to the United States in 1977 and is a resident of Philadelphia, Pennsylvania. Krinsky was active on tour in the 1960s and 1970s.

A Jewish athlete, Krinsky won two medals for South Africa in tennis at the 1969 Maccabiah Games in Tel Aviv, Israel, including a bronze for singles, where he lost to American Allen Fox in the semi-finals, and a silver medal in doubles. He featured in the singles main draws of the 1969 Wimbledon Championships and 1970 French Open. He won a bronze medal in doubles at the 1973 Maccabiah Games.

He won a silver medal for the United States in squash in the 1981 Maccabiah Games.

He previously ran the Julian Krinsky Camps and Programs.
