= Ezio Di Matteo =

Italian tennis player

- Full name: Ezio Di Matteo
- Country (sports): Italy
- Born: 2 November 1948 (age 77)

Singles
- Career record: 19–36
- Career titles: 0

Grand Slam singles results
- French Open: 2R (1970)
- Wimbledon: 2R (1971)

Doubles
- Career record: 13–35
- Career titles: 0

Grand Slam doubles results
- French Open: 2R (1970, 1971, 1972, 1973)
- Wimbledon: 2R (1970)

Ezio Di Matteo (born 2 November 1948) is a former professional tennis player from Italy.

== Biography ==
Di Matteo featured in two Davis Cup matches for Italy, the first in 1968, against Monaco in Biella. He played the doubles rubber, which he and partner Eugenio Castigliano won in straight sets to secure the tie for Italy. His other appearance came against Bulgaria in 1971, on clay courts at Perugia. On this occasion he played a reverse singles and completed a whitewash for Italy by beating Bozhidar Pampoulov.

In Grand Slam competition he competed several times at both the French Open and Wimbledon Championships. His best results on tour were at Senigallia in 1971, when he made the singles quarter-finals and was a finalist in the doubles, with Antonio Zugarelli. He won the Tennis Napoli Cup in 1975.

== Grand Prix career finals ==
=== Doubles: 1 (0–1) ===
Result	W–L	Date	Tournament	Surface	Partner	Opponents	Score
Loss	0–1	Aug 1971	Senigallia, Italy	Clay	(Italy) Antonio Zugarelli	(Indonesia) Atet Wijono (Indonesia) Gondo Widjojo	5–7, 6–3, 5–7

== See also ==
- List of Italy Davis Cup team representatives
