= John Bartlett (tennis) =

Australian tennis player

- Country (sports): Australia
- Residence: Brighton, Victoria, Australia
- Born: 17 March 1948 (age 78) Woonona, NSW, Australia
- Height: 1.88 m (6 ft 2 in)
- Plays: Right-handed

Singles
- Career record: 28–91
- Career titles: 0
- Highest ranking: No. 93 (15 October 1973)

Grand Slam singles results
- Australian Open: 2R (1972, 1974)
- French Open: 2R (1969)
- Wimbledon: 1R (1969, 1970, 1971, 1972)
- US Open: 1R (1974)

Doubles
- Career record: 28–76
- Career titles: 1
- Highest ranking: No. 38 (12 Aug 1996)

Grand Slam doubles results
- Australian Open: QF (1972)
- French Open: 4R (1970)
- Wimbledon: 2R (1975)
- US Open: 2R (1976)

Grand Slam mixed doubles results
- Wimbledon: 4R (1970)

John Bartlett (born John David Bartlett; 17 March 1948) is an Australian former tennis player who was a Davis Cup member and top ten player, in Australia in the 1970s.

== Career ==
His career highlights include winning the "All Japan Indoors" in 1969 and the Egyptian Open Doubles with John Marks and twice qualifying for the ATP World Doubles Finals. He also has wins over many top players including Arthur Ashe. Bartlett, a right-handed player, was an original member of the ATP and in the 1970s an action photo of him playing was included in the International Hall Of Fame in Newport, Rhode Island. Bartlett was also the first Yonex contract Professional. After retiring from his tennis career, Bartlett has involved himself in the following ventures;

Bartlett headed up a program for the ATP in 1979 to introduce prize money into the qualifying events in Europe. Partnered by his wife, they organised over $100,000 in prize money by switching the qualifying events to other towns 50 km away. This has led to many ATP tournaments being formed. John Bartlett was also the SE Asian Manager and Australian director for Penn Racquet Sports. Bartlett developed and distributed his own tennis ball "The Bartlett Tennis Ball" before encountering political difficulties with Tennis Australia. Bartlett currently is working as tennis analyst for SEN Sports Radio Melbourne and also headed up their live commentary team for the 2011 Australian Open.

== Career finals ==
=== Doubles (1 win) ===
Result	W/L	Date	Tournament	Surface	Partner	Opponents	Score
Win	1–0	Mar 1977	Cairo, Egypt	Clay	(Australia) John Marks	(United States) Pat DuPré (United Kingdom) Chris Lewis	7–5, 6–1, 6–3

== Junior Grand Slam titles ==
=== Doubles: 1 ===
Result	Year	Championship	Surface	Partner	Opponents	Score
Win	1967	Australian Open	Grass	(Sweden) Sven Ginman	(Australia) Dave Wright (Australia) Ian Fletcher	6–3, 6–5
