= Franco Bartoni =

Italian tennis player

- Country (sports): Italy
- Born: 4 October 1948 Rome, Italy
- Died: 13 August 2005 (aged 56) Rome, Italy

Singles
- Career record: 4–9

Grand Slam singles results
- French Open: 1R (1970, 1971)
- Wimbledon: Q2 (1970, 1971)

Doubles
- Career record: 6–10

Grand Slam doubles results
- French Open: 3R (1969)
- Wimbledon: 1R (1971)

Grand Slam mixed doubles results
- Wimbledon: 3R (1971)
Medal record
Representing Italy
Summer Universiade
Bronze medal – third place	1970 Turin	Men's singles

Franco Bartoni (4 October 1948 – 13 August 2005) was an Italian tennis administrator and former professional player.

== Biography ==
Born in Rome, Bartoni competed on the professional tour in the late 1960s and early 1970s. He was a member of Italy's Davis Cup squad in 1970 and was a singles bronze medalist at that year's University Games in Turin.

When his playing career ended he moved into tennis administration and headed the Italian Tennis Federation from 1976 to 1978. He served as the tournament director of several tournaments during his career, including the Italian Open.

Bartoni spent the final years of his life in San Marino and was in Rome when he died in 2005 following an unsuccessful operative procedure, at the age of 56.
