= Jean-Paul Meyer =

French tennis player

- Country (sports): France
- Born: 1 January 1950 (age 75)

Singles
- Career record: 17–27

Grand Slam singles results
- Australian Open: 3R (1972)
- French Open: 2R (1970, 1971)
- Wimbledon: 1R (1972)

Doubles
- Career record: 7–19

Grand Slam doubles results
- Australian Open: 2R (1972, 1974)
- French Open: 3R (1973, 1974)

Jean-Paul Meyer (born 1 January 1950) is a French former professional tennis player.

Meyer, runner-up at the French juniors in 1968, was active on tour through to the mid-1970s. He reached the round of 16 at the 1972 Australian Open, where he was beaten by eventual champion Ken Rosewall.
