= Lance Lumsden =

Jamaican tennis player

- Full name: Lancelot Lumsden
- Country (sports): Caribbean/West Indies; Jamaica
- Born: 30 October 1939 Buff Bay, Jamaica
- Died: 18 June 2011 (aged 71) Kingston, Jamaica
- Plays: Right-handed

Singles
- Career record: 1–11

Grand Slam singles results
- Australian Open: 2R (1967)
- French Open: 1R (1968)
- Wimbledon: 1R (1966, 1968)
- US Open: 1R (1966)

Lancelot Lumsden (30 October 1939 – 18 June 2011) was a Jamaican professional tennis player.

== Biography ==
Born in Buff Bay, Lumsden played collegiate tennis in the United States at Southern Illinois University Carbondale in the early 1960s. He went on to compete on the international circuit and featured in the main draws of all four grand slam tournaments, which included a match up against number one seed Rod Laver at the 1968 French Open.

Lumsden was a Davis Cup representative for the Caribbean/West Indies and appeared in a total of seven ties. Four of those came against the United States and he twice faced Arthur Ashe in singles. His most famous win came against Ashe in doubles, when the Caribbean/West Indies hosted the Americans in Kingston in 1966. He and Richard Russell teamed up to defeat Ashe and Charlie Pasarell in five sets. This was one of only two Davis Cup doubles rubbers which Ashe ever played and his only loss.

For much of his life post tennis he lived in the Austrian capital Vienna. He was in a relationship and lived with Austrian TV announcer and journalist Chris Lohner for 15 years, starting 1978. Lumsden was the editor of the Austrian pop music magazine Music Man. At the time of his death in 2011 he was living back in Jamaica. His son Robin Lumsden is a lawyer in Austria.
