= Peter Doerner =

Australian tennis player

- Country (sports): Australia
- Born: 17 November 1950 (age 74); Sydney, Australia

Singles
- Career record: 10-24

Grand Slam singles results
- Australian Open: 1R (1970, 1975)
- French Open: 1R (1970)
- Wimbledon: 2R (1971)
- US Open: 1R (1972)

Doubles
- Career record: 11-20

Grand Slam doubles results
- Australian Open: QF (1971, 1975)
- French Open: 2R (1969)
- Wimbledon: 1R (1970, 1971, 1972, 1975)
- US Open: 1R (1972, 1973, 1974)

Peter Doerner (born 17 November 1950) is an Australian former professional tennis player.

Born in Sydney, Doerner played on the professional tour during the 1970s and featured in the main draw of all four grand slam tournaments. He was a two-time Australian Open quarter-finalist in doubles.

Doerner married tennis player Cynthia Sieler in 1972.
