= 1980 Crossley Carpets Tournament =

- Date: 8–14 June
- Edition: 10th
- Category: Colgate Series (AA)
- Draw: 56S / 28D
- Prize money: $100,000
- Surface: Grass
- Location: Chichester, England
- Venue: Oaklands Park

Champions

Singles
- (United States) Chris Evert-Lloyd

Doubles
- (United States) Pam Shriver / (Netherlands) Betty Stöve
← 1979 ·	Chichester Tennis Tournament

The 1980 Crossley Carpets Tournament, also known as the Chichester Tournament, was a women's tennis tournament played on outdoor grass courts at Oaklands Park in Chichester in England. The event was part of the AA (Note: Tournaments with prize money for the women of at least $100,000.) category of the Colgate Series that was part of the 1980 WTA Tour. It was the tenth and last edition of the tournament and was held from 8 June until 14 June 1980. First-seeded Chris Evert-Lloyd won the singles title and earned $20,000 first-prize money.

== Finals ==
=== Singles ===
(United States) Chris Evert-Lloyd defeated (Australia) Evonne Goolagong Cawley 6–3, 6–7^{(4–7)}, 7–5

- It was Evert-Lloyd's 3rd singles title of the year and the 96th of her career.

=== Doubles ===
(United States) Pam Shriver / (Netherlands) Betty Stöve defeated (United States) Rosie Casals / (Australia) Wendy Turnbull 6–4, 7–5

== Prize money ==
Event	W	F	SF	QF	Round of 16	Round of 32	Round of 64
Singles	$20,000	$10,000	$4,800	$2,050	$1,000	$550	$250
