= 1976 Virginia Slims of Chicago =

- Date: January 26–31
- Edition: 5th
- Category: Virginia Slims circuit
- Draw: 32S
- Prize money: $75,000
- Surface: Carpet (Sporteze) / indoor
- Location: Chicago, Illinois, US
- Venue: International Amphitheatre

Champions

Singles
- (Australia) Evonne Goolagong Cawley

Doubles
- (Soviet Union) Olga Morozova / (United Kingdom) Virginia Wade
- Virginia Slims of Chicago

The 1976 Virginia Slims of Chicago was a women's tennis tournament played on indoor carpet courts at the International Amphitheatre in Chicago, Illinois in the United States that was part of the 1976 Virginia Slims World Championship Series. It was the fifth edition of the tournament and was held from January 26 through January 31, 1976. Third-seeded Evonne Goolagong Cawley won the singles title and earned $15,000 first-prize money.

== Finals ==
=== Singles ===
(Australia) Evonne Goolagong Cawley defeated (United Kingdom) Virginia Wade 3–6, 6–4, 6–2

- It was Goolagong's 1st singles title of the year and the 63rd of her career.

=== Doubles ===
(Soviet Union) Olga Morozova / (United Kingdom) Virginia Wade defeated (Australia) Evonne Goolagong Cawley / (Czechoslovakia) Martina Navratilova 6–7^{(4–5)}, 6–4, 6–4

== Prize money ==
Event	W	F	SF	QF	Round of 16	Round of 32
Singles	$15,000	$8,000	$4,275	$1,900	$1,100	$550
