= Evonne Goolagong Cawley career statistics =

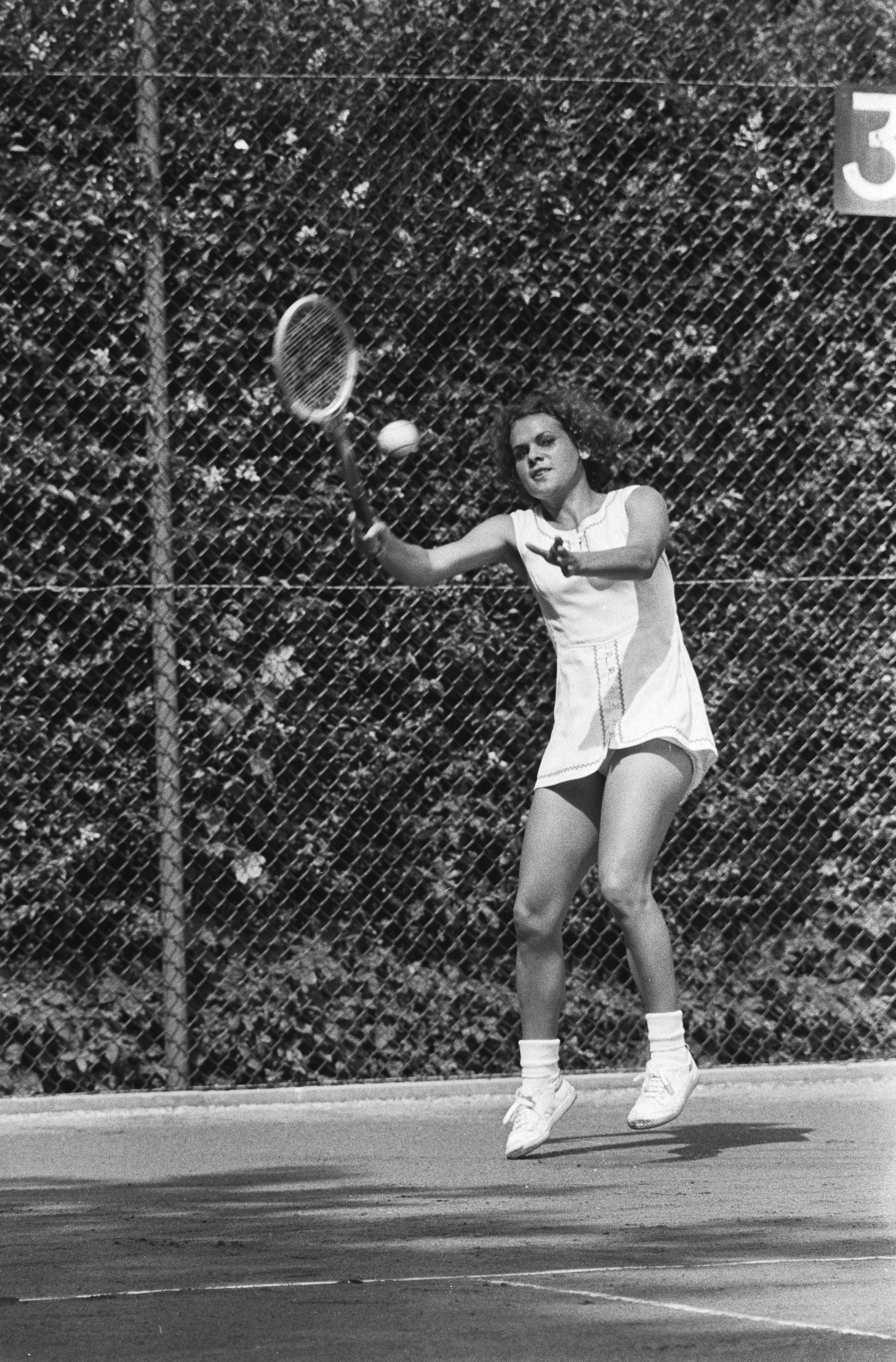
Evonne Goolagong at the 1971 Dutch Open.

This is a list of the main career statistics of former Australian tennis player Evonne Goolagong Cawley. During her career, which lasted from 1967 to 1983, Goolagong won seven singles titles at a Grand Slam event and was a runner-up in 11 occasions. In addition, she won five Grand Slam doubles titles, partnering Margaret Court, Peggy Michel and Helen Gourlay, as well as one mixed doubles title with Kim Warwick. In total she won 84 singles titles, 53 doubles titles and 6 mixed doubles titles. She achieved the No. 1 singles ranking for a two-week period in April–May 1976, although this was only officially recognized in 2007. (Note: Due to an oversight some of her tournament records in 1976 were not properly transferred to a computer, which meant that Goolagong did not receive the No. 1 ranking at the time. The mistake was acknowledged by the Women's Tennis Association (WTA) in December 2007 and after correcting the records she retroactively received the No. 1 ranking.) She was a member of the Australian Federation Cup teams that won the cup in 1971, 1973 and 1974.

== Major finals ==
=== Grand Slam finals ===
==== Singles: 18 finals (7 titles, 11 runners-up) ====
Result	Year	Championship	Surface	Opponent	Score
Loss	1971	Australian Open	Grass	(Australia) Margaret Court	6–2, 6–7^{(0–7)}, 5–7
Win	1971	French Open	Clay	(Australia) Helen Gourlay	6–3, 7–5
Win	1971	Wimbledon	Grass	(Australia) Margaret Court	6–4, 6–1
Loss	1972	Australian Open	Grass	(United Kingdom) Virginia Wade	4–6, 4–6
Loss	1972	French Open	Clay	(United States) Billie Jean King	3–6, 3–6
Loss	1972	Wimbledon	Grass	(United States) Billie Jean King	3–6, 3–6
Loss	1973	Australian Open	Grass	(Australia) Margaret Court	4–6, 5–7
Loss	1973	US Open	Grass	(Australia) Margaret Court	6–7^{(2–7)}, 7–5, 2–6
Win	1974	Australian Open	Grass	(United States) Chris Evert	7–6^{(7–5)}, 4–6, 6–0
Loss	1974	US Open	Grass	(United States) Billie Jean King	6–3, 3–6, 5–7
Win	1975	Australian Open (2)	Grass	(Czechoslovakia) Martina Navratilova	6–3, 6–2
Loss	1975	Wimbledon	Grass	(United States) Billie Jean King	0–6, 1–6
Loss	1975	US Open	Clay	(United States) Chris Evert	7–5, 4–6, 2–6
Win	1976	Australian Open (3)	Grass	(Czechoslovakia) Renáta Tomanová	6–2, 6–2
Loss	1976	Wimbledon	Grass	(United States) Chris Evert	3–6, 6–4, 6–8
Loss	1976	US Open	Clay	(United States) Chris Evert	3–6, 0–6
Win	1977	Australian Open^{(Dec)} (4)	Grass	(Australia) Helen Gourlay	6–3, 6–0
Win	1980	Wimbledon (2)	Grass	(United States) Chris Evert	6–1, 7–6^{(7–4)}

==== Doubles: 6 finals (5 titles, 1 runner-up) ====
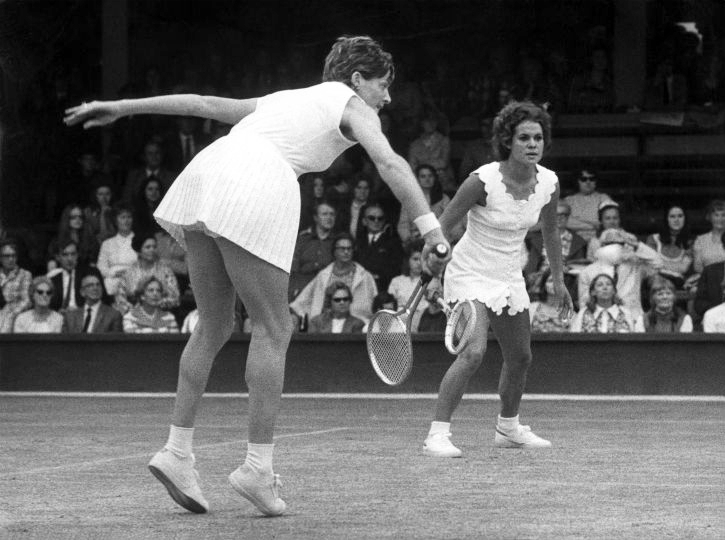
Evonne Goolagong (right) partnering Margaret Court in a doubles semifinal at the 1971 Wimbledon Championships.

Result	Year	Championship	Surface	Partner	Opponents	Score
Win	1971	Australian Open	Grass	(Australia) Margaret Court	(Australia) Jill Emmerson (Australia) Lesley Hunt	6–0, 6–0
Loss	1971	Wimbledon	Grass	(Australia) Margaret Court	(United States) Rosemary Casals (United States) Billie Jean King	3–6, 2–6
Win	1974	Australian Open (2)	Grass	(United States) Peggy Michel	(Australia) Kerry Harris (Australia) Kerry Melville	7–5 6–3
Win	1974	Wimbledon	Grass	(United States) Peggy Michel	(Australia) Helen Gourlay (Australia) Karen Krantzcke	2–6, 6–4, 6–3
Win	1975	Australian Open (3)	Grass	(United States) Peggy Michel	(Australia) Margaret Court (Soviet Union) Olga Morozova	7–6, 7–6
Win	1976	Australian Open (4)	Grass	(Australia) Helen Gourlay	(Czechoslovakia) Renáta Tomanová (Australia) Lesley Turner Bowrey	8–1
Win	1977	Australian Open [Dec.] (5)	Grass	(Australia) Helen Gourlay	(United States) Mona Guerrant (Australia) Kerry Melville Reid	Shared – rained out

Note: The shared women's doubles title at the Australian Open in 1977 (December) isn't traditionally counted in Goolagong's win total because the finals were never played. Evonne Cawley is occasionally credited incorrectly with winning the 1977 Ladies Doubles event at Wimbledon, due to the confusion regarding the married name of her compatriot Helen Gourlay who in fact took the trophy. Both women were listed in tournaments as Mrs. R. Cawley (Goolagong was Mrs. R.A.Cawley and Gourlay Mrs. R.L.Cawley). Goolagong Cawley did not participate at Wimbledon 1977.

==== Mixed doubles: 2 finals (1 title, 1 runner-up) ====
Result	Year	Championship	Surface	Partner	Opponents	Score
Win	1972	French Open	Clay	(Australia) Kim Warwick	(France) Françoise Dürr (France) Jean-Claude Barclay	6–2, 6–4
Loss	1972	Wimbledon	Grass	(Australia) Kim Warwick	(United States) Rosemary Casals (Romania) Ilie Năstase	4–6, 4–6

=== Year-End Championships finals ===
==== Singles: 3 finals (2 titles, 1 runner-up) ====
Result	Year	Championship	Surface	Opponent	Score
Win	1974	Los Angeles, US	Carpet (i)	(United States) Chris Evert	6–3, 6–4
Win	1976	Los Angeles, US	Carpet (i)	(United States) Chris Evert	6–3, 5–7, 6–3
Loss	1978	Oakland, US	Carpet (i)	(United States) Martina Navratilova	6–7^{(0–5)}, 4–6

== Grand Slam singles tournament timeline ==
Key
W	F	SF	QF	#R	RR	Q#	DNQ	A	NH

(W) winner; (F) finalist; (SF) semifinalist; (QF) quarterfinalist; (#R) rounds 4, 3, 2, 1; (RR) round-robin stage; (Q#) qualification round; (DNQ) did not qualify; (A) absent; (NH) not held; (SR) strike rate (events won / competed); (W–L) win–loss record.

Tournament	1967	1968	1969	1970	1971	1972	1973	1974	1975	1976	1977		1978	1979	1980	1981	1982	1983	SR	W–L	Win %
Australian Open	3R	3R	2R	QF	F	F	F	W	W	W	A	W	A	A	2R	QF	2R	A	4 / 14	41–10	80.4
French Open	A	A	A	A	W	F	SF	A	A	A	A		A	A	A	A	A	3R	1 / 4	16–3	84.2
Wimbledon	A	A	A	2R	W	F	SF	QF	F	F	A		SF	SF	W	A	2R	A	2 / 11	49–9	84.5
US Open	A	A	A	A	A	3R	F	F	F	F	A		A	QF	A	A	A	A	0 / 6	26–6	81.3
Win–loss	2–1	2–1	1–1	3–2	16–1	15–4	18–4	14–2	15–2	16–2	5–0		4–1	9–2	7–1	2–1	1–2	2–1	7 / 35	132–28	82.5
Year-end ranking	–	–	–	–	–	–	–	–	5	2	–		3	4	5	–	17	37			

Note: The Australian Open was held twice in '77, in January and December. Goolagong won the December edition. She was seeded #4 for the 1980 US Open Championships, but withdrew from the tournament before play began.

== Career titles (Open Era) ==
The Open Era began on 22 April 1968.

=== Singles (84 titles) ===
Result	No.	Date	Tournament	Surface	Opponent	Score
Win	1.	Sep 1968	Sydney, Australia	Clay	(Australia) Wendy Gilchrist	6–1, 6–3
Win	2.	Jun 1969	Grafton, Australia	Hard	(Australia) Patricia Edwards	7–5, 6–3
Win	3.	Aug 1969	Sydney, Australia	Clay	(Australia) Pat Coleman	1–6, 6–4, 6–0
Win	4.	Oct 1969	Canberra, Australia	Grass	(Australia) Pat Coleman	6–4, 6–1
Win	5.	Dec 1969	Manly, Australia	Grass	(Australia) Wendy Gilchrist	6–2, 4–6, 6–2
Win	6.	Feb 1970	Newcastle, Australia	Clay	(Australia) Karen Krantzcke	6–1, 5–7, 6–3
Win	7.	Mar 1970	Southport, UK	Clay	(United Kingdom) Joyce Williams	6–2, 6–3
Win	8.	Apr 1970	Hampstead, UK	Clay	(United Kingdom) Jill Cooper	6–2, 9–7
Win	9.	Jul 1970	Newport, Wales	Grass	(United States) Patti Hogan	6–0, 8–6
Win	10.	Jul 1970	Hoylake, UK	Grass	(Australia) Kerry Melville	2–6, 6–2, 6–1
Win	11.	Jul 1970	Leicester, UK	Grass	(United States) Patti Hogan	6–2, 6–2
Win	12.	Aug 1970	Munich, West Germany	Clay	(Australia) Karen Krantzcke	6–2, 6–1
Win	13.	Aug 1970	Innbruck, Austria	Clay	(Austria) Sonja Pachta	7–5, 6–0
Win	14.	Oct 1970	Coogee, Australia		(Australia) Anne Coleman	6–2, 6–0
Win	15.	Nov 1970	Toowoomba, Australia	Clay	(Australia) Marilyn Tesch	6–3, 7–5
Win	16.	Nov 1970	Brisbane, Australia	Grass	(United States) Kristien Kemmer	6–3, 6–2
Win	17.	Jan 1971	Melbourne, Australia	Grass	(Australia) Margaret Court	7–6^{(5–3)}, 7–6^{(5–2)}
Win	18.	Feb 1971	Tamworth, Australia	Clay	(United States) Patti Hogan	6–1, 6–4
Win	19.	Feb 1971	Christchurch, New Zealand	Grass	(Netherlands) Betty Stöve	6–1, 6–4
Win	20.	Apr 1971	Sutton, United Kingdom	Grass	(United Kingdom) Joyce Williams	7–5, 2–6, 6–3
Win	21.	May 1971	Guildford, UK	Clay	(United Kingdom) Jill Cooper	6–4, 6–3
Win	22.	May 1971	French Open, Paris, France	Clay	(Australia) Helen Gourlay	6–3, 7–5
Win	23.	Jun 1971	Wimbledon, London, UK	Grass	(Australia) Margaret Court	6–4, 6–1
Win	24.	Jul 1971	Leicester, UK	Grass	(United States) Patti Hogan	6–2, 6–4
Win	25.	Jul 1971	Hilversum, Netherlands	Clay	(Sweden) Christina Sandberg	8–6, 6–3
Win	26.	Nov 1971	Edinburgh, United Kingdom	Carpet	(France) Françoise Dürr	6–0, 6–4
Win	27.	Nov 1971	Torquay, United Kingdom	Carpet	(France) Françoise Dürr	6–1, 6–0
Win	28.	Dec 1971	Brisbane, Australia	Grass	(Australia) Helen Gourlay	6–2, 7–6^{(7–2)}
Win	29.	Dec 1971	Brisbane, Australia	Clay	(United States) Mona Schallau	6–1, 6–1
Win	30.	Jan 1972	Sydney, Australia	Grass	(United Kingdom) Virginia Wade	6–1, 7–6^{(7–4)}
Win	31.	Jan 1972	Adelaide, Australia	Grass	(Soviet Union) Olga Morozova	7–6^{(7–3)}, 6–3
Win	32.	Jan 1972	Perth, Australia	Grass	(Soviet Union) Olga Morozova	6–2, 7–5
Win	33.	Mar 1972	Johannesburg, South Africa	Hard	(United Kingdom) Virginia Wade	4–6, 6–3, 6–0
Win	34.	May 1972	Bournemouth, UK	Clay	(West Germany) Helga Masthoff	6–0, 6–4
Win	35.	May 1972	Guildford, UK	Clay	(United Kingdom) Joyce Williams	7–5, 6–2
Win	36.	Jul 1972	Dublin, Ireland	Grass	(South Africa) Pat Pretorius	2–6, 6–1, 6–2
Win	37.	Jul 1972	Hoylake, United Kingdom	Grass	(Netherlands) Betty Stöve	Title Shared
Win	38.	Aug 1972	Toronto, Canada	Clay	(United Kingdom) Virginia Wade	6–1, 6–3
Win	39.	Nov 1972	Melbourne, Australia	Clay	(Australia) Patricia Coleman	6–7^{(5–7)}, 6–2, 6–2
Win	40.	Nov 1972	Brisbane, Australia	Grass	(United Kingdom) Glynis Coles	6–0, 7–5
Win	41.	Dec 1972	Adelaide, Australia	Grass	(Australia) Kerry Harris	6–1, 6–2
Win	42.	Jan 1973	Auckland, New Zealand	Grass	(New Zealand) Marilyn Pryde	6–0, 6–1
Win	43.	Mar 1973	Hingham, United States	Carpet	(United Kingdom) Virginia Wade	6–4, 6–4
Win	44.	May 1973	Lee-on-Solent, UK	Clay	(South Africa) Pat Pretorius	6–3, 6–2
Win	45.	Jun 1973	Rome, Italy	Clay	(United States) Chris Evert	7–6^{(8–6)}, 6–0
Win	46.	Jul 1973	Bratislava, Czechoslovakia	Clay	(Czechoslovakia) Renáta Tomanová	6–3, 6–3
Win	47.	Aug 1973	Cincinnati, U.S.	Clay	(United States) Chris Evert	6–2, 7–5
Win	48.	Aug 1973	Toronto, Canada	Clay	(West Germany) Helga Masthoff	7–6^{(7–2)}, 6–4
Win	49.	Sep 1973	Charlotte, U.S.	Clay	(Soviet Union) Eugenia Birioukova	6–2, 6–0
Win	50.	Oct 1973	Tokyo, Japan	Clay	(West Germany) Helga Masthoff	7–6, 6–3
Win	51.	Dec 1973	Perth, Australia	Grass	(Australia) Kerry Harris	7–5, 6–1
Win	52.	Dec 1973	Australian Open, Melbourne	Grass	(United States) Chris Evert	7–6^{(7–5)}, 4–6, 6–0
Win	53.	Jan 1974	Auckland, New Zealand	Grass	(United States) Ann Kiyomura	6–3, 6–1
Win	54.	Sep 1974	Denver, U.S.	Carpet	(United States) Chris Evert	7–5, 3–6, 6–4
Win	55.	Oct 1974	Virginia Slims Championships, U.S.	Carpet (i)	(United States) Chris Evert	6–3, 6–4
Win	56.	Nov 1974	Victoria, Australia	Hard	(Australia) Cynthia Doerner	6–1, 6–2
Win	57.	Dec 1974	Sydney, Australia	Grass	(Australia) Margaret Court	6–3, 7–5
Win	58.	Dec 1974	Australian Open, Melbourne	Grass	(Czechoslovakia) Martina Navratilova	6–3, 6–2
Win	59.	Jan 1975	Auckland, New Zealand	Grass	(United Kingdom) Linda Mottram	6–2, 7–5
Win	60.	Feb 1975	Detroit, U.S.	Carpet (i)	(Australia) Margaret Court	6–3, 3–6, 6–3
Win	61.	Dec 1975	Sydney, Australia	Grass	(United Kingdom) Sue Barker	6–2, 6–4
Win	62.	Dec 1975	Australian Open, Melbourne	Grass	(Czechoslovakia) Renáta Tomanová	6–2, 6–2
Win	63.	Jan 1976	Chicago, U.S.	Carpet (i)	(United Kingdom) Virginia Wade	3–6, 6–4, 6–2
Win	64.	Feb 1976	Akron, U.S.	Carpet (i)	(United Kingdom) Virginia Wade	6–2, 3–6, 6–2
Win	65.	Mar 1976	Dallas, U.S.	Carpet (i)	(United States) Martina Navratilova	6–1, 6–1
Win	66.	Mar 1976	Boston, U.S.	Carpet (i)	(United Kingdom) Virginia Wade	6–2, 6–0
Win	67.	Mar 1976	Philadelphia, U.S.	Carpet (i)	(United States) Chris Evert	6–3, 7–6^{(5–3)}
Win	68.	Apr 1976	Virginia Slims Championships, U.S.	Carpet (i)	(United States) Chris Evert	6–3, 5–7, 6–3
Win	69.	Oct 1976	Hilton Head Island, U.S.	Clay	(United Kingdom) Virginia Wade	6–3, 6–4
Win	70.	Nov 1977	Sydney, Australia	Grass	(Australia) Kerry Reid	6–1, 6–3
Win	71.	Nov 1977	Melbourne, Australia	Grass	(Australia) Wendy Turnbull	6–4, 6–1
Win	72.	Dec 1977	Sydney, Australia	Grass	(United Kingdom) Sue Barker	6–2, 6–3
Win	73.	Dec 1977	Australian Open, Melbourne	Grass	(Australia) Helen Gourlay Cawley	6–3, 6–0
Win	74.	Jan 1978	Hollywood, U.S.	Carpet (i)	(Australia) Wendy Turnbull	6–2, 6–3
Win	75.	Mar 1978	Dallas, U.S.	Carpet (i)	(United States) Tracy Austin	4–6, 6–0, 6–2
Win	76.	Mar 1978	Boston, U.S.	Carpet (i)	(United States) Chris Evert	4–6, 6–1, 6–4
Win	77.	May 1978	Surbiton, UK	Grass	(United Kingdom) Winnie Wooldridge	6–1, 6–1
Win	78.	Jun 1978	Beckenham, UK	Grass	(United States) Laura duPont	6–4, 6–2
Win	79.	Jun 1978	Chichester, UK	Grass	(United States) Pam Teeguarden	6–4, 6–4
Win	80.	Jun 1979	Beckenham, UK	Grass	(United States) Pam Shriver	6–3, 6–2
Win	81.	Jun 1979	Chichester, UK	Grass	(United Kingdom) Sue Barker	6–1, 6–4
Win	82.	Oct 1979	Minneapolis, U.S.	Carpet (i)	(Australia) Dianne Fromholtz	6–3, 6–4
Win	83.	Oct 1979	Tampa, U.S.	Hard	(United Kingdom) Virginia Wade	6–0, 6–3
Win	84.	Jun 1980	Wimbledon, London, UK	Grass	(United States) Chris Evert-Lloyd	6–1, 7–6^{(7–4)}

=== Doubles (53 titles) ===
No.	Date	Tournament	Location	Surface	Partner	Opponents	Score
1.	Jun 1969	North Coast Championships	Grafton, Australia	Grass	(Australia) Patricia Edwards	(United States) Jane Albert (Kenya) Jane Davies	6–4, 7–5
2.	Aug 1969	Metropolitan Hardcourt Championships	Sydney, Australia	Clay	(Australia) Patricia Edwards	(Australia) Sue Alexander (Australia) Norma Marsh	6–3, 2–6, 6–2
3.	Oct 1969	Metropolitan Grass Championships	Strathfield, Australia	Grass	(Australia) Patricia Edwards	(Australia) Jill Emmerson (Australia) Pat Brien	6–1, 6–1
4.	Jul 1970	Midland Open	Leicester, UK	Grass	(Australia) Patricia Edwards	(Australia) Judy Dalton (Australia) Kerry Melville	7–5, 5–7, 6–3
5.	Aug 1970	South Tyrolean Championships	Innsbruck, Austria	Clay	(Australia) Patricia Edwards	(South Africa) Daphne Botha (South Africa) Brenda Kirk	6–3, 6–0
6.	Oct 1970	Eastern Suburbs Open	Coogee Beach, Australia	Grass	(Australia) Patricia Edwards	(Australia) Anne Coleman (Australia) Sue Hole	6–2, 6–1
7.	Oct 1970	Strathfield Tournament	Strathfield, Australia	Grass	(Australia) Patricia Edwards	(Australia) Sue Hole (South Africa) Norma Marsh	6–3, 6–3
8.	Nov 1970	Australian Hard Court Championships	Toowoomba, Australia	Clay	(Australia) Patricia Edwards	(Australia) Anne Coleman (South Africa) Marilyn Tesch	7–6, 6–4
9.	Jan 1971	Western Australian Championships	Perth, Australia	Grass	(Australia) Margaret Court	(United Kingdom) Winnie Shaw (United Kingdom) Virginia Wade	6–4, 7–5
10.	Mar 1971	Benson & Hedges Open	Auckland, New Zealand	Grass	(Australia) Margaret Court	(United Kingdom) Winnie Shaw (Australia) Lesley Turner	7–6, 6–0
11.	Mar 1971	Australian Open	Melbourne, Australia	Grass	(Australia) Margaret Court	(Australia) Lesley Hunt (Australia) Jill Emmerson	6–0, 6–0
12.	Apr 1971	Natal Open Championships	Durban, South Africa	Hard	(Australia) Margaret Court	(Australia) Kerry Harris (Australia) Winnie Shaw	3–6, 6–3, 6–3
13.	Apr 1971	South African Open	Johannesburg, South Africa	Hard	(Australia) Margaret Court	(South Africa) Brenda Kirk (South Africa) Laura Rossouw	6–3, 6–2
14.	Apr 1971	Rothmans Sutton	Sutton, UK	Grass	(United Kingdom) Joyce Williams	(United Kingdom) Shirley Brasher (United States) Margaret Cooper	6–4, 6–2
15.	Jul 1971	Midland Open	Leicester, UK	Grass	(Australia) Judy Dalton	(Australia) Barbara Hawcroft (United States) Patti Hogan	8–6, 6–4
16.	Oct 1971	Edinburgh Cup	Edinburgh, Scotland	Carpet (i)	(United States) Julie Heldman	(United States) Patti Hogan (United Kingdom) Nell Truman	6–3, 6–0
17.	Nov 1971	Dewar Cup Torquay	Torquay, UK	Carpet (i)	(United States) Julie Heldman	(France) Françoise Dürr (United Kingdom) Virginia Wade	7–6, 6–4
18.	Nov 1971	Dewar Cup London	London, UK	Carpet (i)	(United States) Julie Heldman	(France) Françoise Dürr (United Kingdom) Virginia Wade	7–5, 6–4
19.	Jan 1972	Sydney International	Sydney, Australia	Grass	(Australia) Patricia Edwards	(Australia) Lesley Bowrey (United Kingdom) Virginia Wade	6–1, 6–2
20.	Jan 1972	South Australian Open	Adelaide, Australia	Grass	(Soviet Union) Olga Morozova	(Australia) Kerry Hogarth (Australia) Marilyn Tesch	6–3, 6–0
21.	Feb 1972	Western Australian Open	Perth, Australia	Grass	(Australia) Pat Hawcroft	(Soviet Union) Olga Morozova (Australia) Janet Young	3–6, 6–4, 6–3
22.	Apr 1972	South African Open	Johannesburg, South Africa	Hard	(Australia) Helen Gourlay	(United Kingdom) Winnie Shaw (United Kingdom) Joyce Williams	6–1, 6–4
23.	May 1972	British Hard Court Championships	Bournemouth, UK	Clay	(Australia) Helen Gourlay	(South Africa) Brenda Kirk (Netherlands) Betty Stöve	7–5, 6–1
24.	May 1972	Surrey Hard Court Championships	Guilford, UK	Clay	(Australia) Helen Gourlay	(United Kingdom) Winnie Shaw (United Kingdom) Joyce Williams	6–1, 6–2
25.	Aug 1972	Cincinnati Masters	Cincinnati, US	Clay	(Australia) Margaret Court	(South Africa) Brenda Kirk (South Africa) Pat Walkden	6–4, 6–1
26.	Aug 1972	U.S. Women's Clay Court Championships	Indianapolis, US	Clay	(Australia) Leslie Hunt	(Australia) Margaret Court (United States) Pam Teeguarden	6–2, 6–1
27.	Aug 1972	Canadian Open	Toronto, Canada	Clay	(Australia) Margaret Court	(South Africa) Brenda Kirk (South Africa) Pat Walkden	3–6, 6–3, 7–5
28.	Nov 1972	Australian Hard Court Championships	Melbourne, Australia	Clay	(Australia) Janet Young	(Australia) Pat Coleman (Australia) Sally Irvine	2–6, 6–4, 6–3
29.	Dec 1972	New South Wales Open	Sydney, Australia	Grass	(Australia) Patricia Edwards	(Australia) Lesley Turner (United Kingdom) Virginia Wade	6–1, 6–2
30.	Jan 1973	New Zealand Open	Auckland, New Zealand	Grass	(Australia) Janet Young	(Australia) Pat Coleman (Australia) Marilyn Tesch	6–1, 6–3
31.	Mar 1973	Maureen Connolly Brinker Memorial	Dallas, US	Carpet (i)	(Australia) Janet Young	(France) Gail Chanfreau (Australia) Virginia Wade	6–3, 6–2
32.	May 1973	Mercedes Benz Open	Lee-on-Solent, UK	Grass	(Australia) Janet Young	(United Kingdom) Jackie Fayter (Australia) Peggy Michel	6–1, 6–2
33.	Aug 1973	Canadian Open	Toronto, Canada	Clay	(United States) Peggy Michel	(France) Gail Chanfreau (Czech Republic) Martina Navratilova	6–3, 6–2
34.	Sep 1973	Four Roses Classic	Charlotte, US	Carpet (i)	(Australia) Janet Young	(South Africa) Ilana Kloss (Czech Republic) Martina Navratilova	6–2, 6–0
35.	Jan 1974	Australian Open	Melbourne, Australia	Grass	(United States) Peggy Michel	(Australia) Kerry Harris (Australia) Kerry Melville	7–5, 6–3
36.	Jan 1974	New Zealand Open	Auckland, New Zealand	Grass	(Australia) Janet Young	(United States) Peggy Michel (Australia) Wendy Turnbull	6–1, 7–6
37.	Apr 1974	Virginia Slims of Sarasota	Sarasota, US	Clay	(United States) Chris Evert	(United States) Tory Fretz (United States) Ceci Martinez	6–2, 6–2
38.	Jul 1974	Wimbledon	Wimbledon, UK	Grass	(United States) Peggy Michel	(Australia) Helen Gourlay (Australia) Karen Krantzcke	2–6, 6–3, 6–4
39.	Nov 1974	World Invitational Doubles	Hilton Head, US	Clay	(United Kingdom) Virginia Wade	(United States) Chris Evert (United States) Billie Jean King	3–6, 6–4, 6–4
40.	Dec 1974	Queensland Open	Brisbane, Australia	Grass	(United States) Peggy Michel	(Australia) Vicki Lancaster (United States) Ceci Martinez	6–1, 6–2
41.	Dec 1974	South Australian Open	Adelaide, Australia	Grass	(United States) Peggy Michel	(Czech Republic) Martina Navratilova (Japan) Kazuko Sawamatsu	6–3, 4–6, 7–5
42.	Dec 1974	Sydney International	Sydney, Australia	Grass	(United States) Peggy Michel	(Soviet Union) Olga Morozova (Czech Republic) Martina Navratilova	6–7, 6–4, 6–1
43.	Jan 1975	Australian Open	Melbourne, Australia	Grass	(United States) Peggy Michel	(Australia) Margaret Court (Soviet Union) Olga Morozova	7–6, 7–6
44.	Jan 1975	New Zealand Open	Auckland, New Zealand	Grass	(United States) Wendy Turnbull	(United States) Laura Dupont (United States) Ceci Martinez	6–3, 4–6, 6–4
45.	Mar 1975	Virginia Slims of Philadelphia	Philadelphia, US	Indoor (i)	(Netherlands) Betty Stöve	(United States) Rosie Casals (United States) Billie Jean King	4–6, 6–4, 7–6
46.	Apr 1975	Family Circle Cup	Amelia Island, US	Clay	(United Kingdom) Virginia Wade	(United States) Rosie Casals (Soviet Union) Olga Morozova	4–6, 6–4, 6–2
47.	Dec 1975	Sydney International	Sydney, Australia	Grass	(Australia) Helen Gourlay	(Germany) Heidi Eisterlehner (Germany) Helga Masthoff	6–3, 4–6, 6–3
48.	Jan 1976	Australian Open	Melbourne, Australia	Grass	(Australia) Helen Gourlay	(Australia) Lesley Bowrey (Czech Republic) Renáta Tomanová	8–1^{ɪ}
49.	Oct 1976	World Invitational Hilton Head	Hilton Head, US	Clay	(United Kingdom) Sue Barker	(Czech Republic) Martina Navratilova (United Kingdom) Virginia Wade	6–4, 4–6, 6–3
50.	Sep 1977	World Invitational Hilton Head	Hilton Head, US	Clay	(Australia) Kerry Reid	(Australia) Dianne Fromholtz (United Kingdom) Virginia Wade	6–2, 3–6, 6–4
51.	Nov 1977	Toyota Classic	Melbourne, Australia	Grass	(Netherlands) Betty Stöve	(United States) Patricia Bostrom (Australia) Kym Ruddell	6–3, 6–0
52.	Dec 1977	Sydney International	Sydney, Australia	Grass	(Australia) Helen Gourlay	(United States) Mona Guerrant (Australia) Kerry Reid	6–0, 6–0
53.	Feb 1978	Virginia Slims of Chicago	Chicago, US	Carpet (i)	(Netherlands) Betty Stöve	(United States) Rosie Casals (Australia) JoAnne Russell	6–1, 6–4

^{ɪ} Due to bad weather, the 1976 Australian Open doubles final was played over one pro set.
Most titles w/ doubles partners:

- 10 w/ Patricia Edwards
- 7 w/ Margaret Court
- 7 w/ Peggy Michel
- 6 w/ Helen Gourlay
- 6 w/ Janet Young

=== Mixed doubles (6 titles) ===
- 5 November 1970 – Australian Hardcourt Championships (w/Bob Giltinan) defeated Patricia Edwards and Ross Case 6–2, 7–5
- 4 June 1972 – French Open (w/Kim Warwick) defeated Françoise Dürr and Jean-Claude Barclay 6–2 6–4
- 14 January 1973 – New Zealand Open (w/Ross Case) defeated Janet Young and Dick Crealy 6–1, 6–3
- 27 November 1973 – South African Open (w/Jürgen Fassbender) defeated Ilana Kloss and Bernard Mitton 6–3 6–2
- 19 January 1974 – New Zealand Hard Court Championships (w/Russell Simpson) defeated Sue Barker and John Lloyd 6–3, 6–4
- 11 October 1980 – Hilton Head, South Carolina, World Couples Championships (w/Stan Smith) defeated Andrea Jaeger and Dick Stockton 7–5 6–4

== Federation Cup ==
Goolagong played in 26 ties in the then-named Federation Cup between 1970 and 1982. Of the seven years she played, the Australian team won in three: 1971, 1973 and 1974. She accumulated a total of 35 wins over her career, which ties with Margaret Court and Dianne Balestrat as the third-most ever from an Australian. She holds a 22–3 singles record and a 13–2 record in doubles.

=== Wins (3) ===
Edition	Team	Round	Opponents	Result
1971 Federation Cup	Margaret Court; Evonne Goolagong; Lesley Hunt			
1971 Federation Cup	Margaret Court; Evonne Goolagong; Lesley Hunt	QF	(Socialist Federal Republic of Yugoslavia) Yugoslavia	Win (w/o)
1971 Federation Cup	Margaret Court; Evonne Goolagong; Lesley Hunt	SF	France	Win (3–0)
1971 Federation Cup	Margaret Court; Evonne Goolagong; Lesley Hunt	F	(United Kingdom) Great Britain	Win (3–0)
1973 Federation Cup	Patricia Coleman; Evonne Goolagong; Janet Young			
1973 Federation Cup	Patricia Coleman; Evonne Goolagong; Janet Young	QF	Indonesia	Win (3–0)
1973 Federation Cup	Patricia Coleman; Evonne Goolagong; Janet Young	SF	West Germany	Win (3–0)
1973 Federation Cup	Patricia Coleman; Evonne Goolagong; Janet Young	F	South Africa	Win (3–0)
1974 Federation Cup	Dianne Fromholtz; Evonne Goolagong; Janet Young			
1974 Federation Cup	Dianne Fromholtz; Evonne Goolagong; Janet Young	QF	Italy	Win (3–0)
1974 Federation Cup	Dianne Fromholtz; Evonne Goolagong; Janet Young	SF	(United Kingdom) Great Britain	Win (3–0)
1974 Federation Cup	Dianne Fromholtz; Evonne Goolagong; Janet Young	F	United States	Win (2–1)

== Tournament results ==
(Championship wins in bold)

1966 (Won 0 of 2 tournaments)

- New South Wales Open, Sydney AUS: 3RD Lost Gail Sheriff 2–6 3–6
- South Australian Championships, Adelaide AUS: 3RD Lost Nancy Richey 1–6 0–6

1967 (Won 0 of 6 tournaments)

- Manly, Australia: Quarter Final Lost Betty Stöve 5–7 ?–?
- Australian Championships, Adelaide: 3RD Lost Kerry Melville 0–6 2–6
- Sydney Metro, AUS: Quarter Final Lost Karen Krantzke 6–2 2–6 2–6
- Queensland Grass Courts, Brisbane AUS: TBD
- New South Wales Open, Sydney AUS: TBD
- Victorian Championships, Melbourne AUS: TBD

1968 (Won 1 of 7 tournaments)

- Manly, AUS: 2RD Lost Blackman 5–7 5–7
- Australian Championships, Melbourne AUS: 3RD Lost Margaret Court 3–6 1–6
- New South Wales Hardcourt Championships, Woliongong AUS: Final Lost Fenton 6–4 4–6 5–7
- **Sydney Metropolitan Hardcourt Championships, AUS: Champion. F d. Wendy Gilchrist 6–1 6–3**
- Queensland Hardcourt Championships, Brisbane AUS: TBD
- Australian Hardcourt Championships: Final Lost Karen Krantzke 1–6 1–6
- Queensland Grass Championships, Brisbane AUS: Quarter Final Lost Lesley Bowrey 5–7 2–6

1969 (Won 2 of 11 tournaments)

- Tasmanian Championships, Hobart AUS: Quarter Final Lost Lesley Bowrey 3–6 2–6
- Victorian Championships, Melbourne AUS: 2RD Lost Helen Gourlay 4–6 4–6
- New South Wales Open, Sydney AUS: 2RD Lost Ann Jones 2–6 1–6
- Australian Open Championships, Melbourne AUS: 2RD Lost Billie Jean King 3–6 1–6
- **New South Wales Hardcourt Championships, Cowra AUS: Champion. F d. Wendy Gilchrist 6–4 6–2**
- Sydney Metro, AUS: Final Lost Patricia Coleman 6–1 4–6 0–6
- **National Capital Championships, Canberra AUS: Champion. F d. Patricia Coleman 6–4 6–1**
- Metropolitan Grass Court Championships, Sydney AUS: Final Lost Karen Krantzcke 3–6 4–6
- Australian Hardcourt Championships, Sydney AUS: Quarter Final Lost Christina Sandberg 6–2 6–8 4–6
- Queensland Hardcourt Championships, Toowoomba, AUS: Final Lost Christina Sandberg 6–3 2–6 2–6
- Queensland Grass Championships, Brisbane AUS: Quarter Final Lost Kerry Harris 5–7 2–6

1970 (Won 15 of 33 tournaments)

- **Manly Seaside Cup, Sydney AUS: Champion. Final d. Karen Krantzcke 6–2 4–6 6–1**
- Victorian Championships, Melbourne AUS: 1RD Lost Kerry Melville 1–6 0–6
- Tasmanian Championships, Hobart AUS: 2RD Lost Lesley Hunt 4–6 0–6
- **New South Wales Hardcourt Championships, Newcastle AUS: Champion. F d. Karen Krantzcke 6–1 5–7 6–3**
- Australian Open Championships, Melbourne AUS: Quarter Final Lost Margaret Court 6–3 6–1
- Dunlop Open, Sydney AUS: 1RD Lost Françoise Dürr 2–6 3–6
- **Southport, UK: Champion. F d. Joyce Williams 6–2 6–3**
- Stalybridge, UK: Final Lost Joyce Williams 5–7 8–6 3–6
- Poole En Tout Cas, Dorset UK: Final Lost Joyce Williams 2–6 0–6
- **Cumberland (or Hampstead?), UK: Champion. Final d. Jill Cooper 6–2 9–7**
- Sutton, UK: 3RD Lost Ann Jones 6–4 3–6 4–6
- British Hardcourt Championships, Bournemouth UK: Final Lost Margaret Court 1–6 4–6
- Surrey Hardcourt Championships, Guildford UK: Quarter Final Lost Gail Chanfreau 1–6 4–6
- Bio-Strath London Hardcourt Championships, Hurlingham UK: Semi Final Lost Ann Jones 6–3 3–6 5–7
- Surbiton, UK: Quarter Final Lost Joyce Williams 7–9 4–6
- Rothman's Northern Championships, Manchester UK: 3RD Lost Kristy Pigeon 2–6 6–1 2–6
- Rothman's Kent Championships, Beckenham UK: Quarter Final Lost Patti Hogan 2–6 0–6
- Queen's Club, London UK: 1RD Lost Townsend 2–6 6–1 5–7
- Wimbledon Championships, London UK: 2RD Lost Jane Bartkowitz 4–6 0–6
- **Wimbledon All England Plate Trophy, London UK: Champion. F d. Lita Liem 6–2 6–1**
- **Welsh Open Championships, Newport UK: Champion. F d. Patti Hogan 6–0 8–6**
- **Hoylake, UK: Champion. F d. Kerry Melville 2–6 6–2 6–1**
- **Green Shield Midland Open, Leicester UK: Champion. F d. Patti Hogan 6–2 6–2**
- Dutch Open Championships, Hilversum NED: Quarter Final Lost Margaret Court 2–6 2–6
- **Bavarian Open, Munich GER: Champion. F d. Karen Krantzcke 6–2 6–1**
- German Open Championships, Hamburg: Final Lost Helga Niessen 3–6 3–6
- Kitzbühel, AUT: Final Lost Helga Niessen 5–7 3–6
- **Eastern Suburb Hardcourt Championships, AUS: Champion. F d. Ann Coleman 6–2 6–0**
- **Sydney Metro Grass Court Championships, AUS: Champion. F d. Patricia Coleman 6–3 6–1**
- **Queensland Hardcourt Championships, AUS: Champion. F d. Patti Ann Reese 6–3 3–6 6–4**
- **Australian Hardcourt Championships, Toowoomba: Champion. F d. Marilyn Tesch 6–3 7–5**
- **Queensland Grass Court Championships, Brisbane AUS: Champion. F d. Kristien Kemmer 6–3 6–2**
- **Metro Hard Court Championships, Sydney AUS: Champion. F d. Ann Coleman**

1971 (Won 12 of 29 tournaments)

- Western Australia Championships, Perth: 2RD Lost Betty Stöve 6–8 2–6
- New South Wales Open Championships, Sydney AUS: 2RD Lost Betty Stöve 4–6 6–3 5–7
- **Victorian Championships, Australia: Champion. F d. Margaret Court 7–6 7–6**
- **New Zealand Championships, Auckland: Champion. F d. Betty Stöve 6–1 6–4**
- Benson & Hedges Championships, Auckland, NZ: Final lost Margaret Court 6–3 6–7 2–6
- **New South Wales Hardcourt Championships, Tamworth AUS: Champion. F d. Patti Hogan 6–1 6–4**
- Australian Open, Melbourne: Final lost Margaret Court 6–2 6–7 5–7
- Natal Open Championships, Durban RSA: Quarter Final Lost Orth 6–2 5–7 4–6
- South Africa Open, Johannesburg: Final lost Margaret Court 3–6 1–6
- **Rothman's Championships, Sutton UK: Champion. F d. Joyce Williams 7–5 2–6 6–3**
- **Rothman's Surrey Hardcourt Championships, Guildford UK: Champion. F d. Jill Cooper 6–4 6–3**
- Bio-Strath London Hardcourt Championships, Hurlingham UK: 3RD Lost Judy Dalton (3 sets)
- British Hard Court Championships, Bournemouth: Final lost Margaret Court 5–7 1–6
- **French Open Championships, Paris: Champion. F d. Helen Gourlay 6–3 7–5**
- JP Four-Woman Round robin Championship, Nottingham UK: Final Lost Margaret Court 4–6 0–6
- **Wimbledon, UK: Champion. F d. Margaret Court 6–4 6–1**
- Carroll's Irish Open, Dublin: Final lost Margaret Court 3–6 6–2 3–6
- North of England Championships, Hoylake: Quarter Final Lost Patti Hogan 0–6 6–4 2–6
- **Green Shield Midland Championships, Leicester UK: Champion. F d. Patti Hogan 6–2 6–4**
- **Dutch Open Championships, Hilversum: Champion. F d. Christina Sandberg 8–6 6–3**
- Rothman's Canadian Open Championships, Toronto: Final Lost Françoise Dürr 4–6 2–6
- **Dewar Cup, Edinburgh UK: Champion. F d. Françoise Dürr 6–0 6–3**
- Dewar Cup, Billingham UK: Semi Final Lost Julie Heldman 0–6 7–5
- Embassy British Indoor Championships, London: Semi Final Lost Françoise Dürr 4–6 4–6
- Dewar Cup, Aberavon UK: Final Lost Virginia Wade 6–7 3–6
- Dewar Cup, Torquay UK: Final Lost Françoise Dürr 6–1 4–6 3–6
- Dewar Cup Championships, London UK: Semi Final Final Julie Heldman 0–6 6–0 1–6
- **Queensland Grass Court Championships, AUS: Champion. F d. Helen Gourlay 6–2 7–6**
- **Australian Hardcourt Championships, Brisbane AUS: Champion. F d. Mona Schallau 1–6 1–6**

1972 (Won 13 of 23 tournaments)

- Australian Open Championships, Melbourne: Final Lost Virginia Wade 4–6 4–6
- **New South Wales Open, Sydney AUS: Champion. F d. Virginia Wade 6–1 7–6**
- **South Australia Championships, Adelaide AUS: Champion. F d. Olga Morozova 7–6 6–3**
- **Western Australia Championships, Perth AUS: Champion. F d. Olga Morozova 6–2 7–5**
- **New South Wales Hardcourt Championships, Sydney AUS: Champion. TBD**
- Maureen Connolly International (Virginia Slims), Dallas TX USA: Semi Final Lost Billie Jean King 6–1 3–6 4–6
- **South African Open, Johannesburg: Champion. F d. Virginia Wade 4–6 6–3 6–0**
- **Rothman's British Hardcourt Championships, Bournemouth UK: Champion. F d. Helga Masthoff 6–0 6–4**
- **Rothman's Surrey Hardcourt Championships, Guildford UK: Champion. F d. Joyce Williams 7–5 6–2**
- French Open Championships, Paris FRA: Final Lost Billie Jean King 3–6 3–6
- JP Four-Woman Round Robin Championship, Nottingham UK: Group d. Rosie Casals 6–3 7–5 / Lost Virginia Wade 7–6 4–6 5–7
- WD & HO Wills Cup, Bristol UK: Semi Final Lost Kerry Melville 8–9 6–2 2–6
- Wimbledon Championships, London UK: Final Lost Billie Jean King 3–6 3–6
- **Carroll's Irish Open, Dublin IRE: Champion. Final d. Pat Pretorius 2–6 6–1 6–2**
- **Rothman's North of England Championships, Hoylake UK: Champion. F not played. Title split with Betty Stöve**
- Western Open Championships, Cincinnati OH USA: Final Lost Margaret Court 6–3 2–6 5–7
- US Clay Court Championships, Indianapolis IN USA: Final Lost Chris Evert 6–7 1–6
- **Rothman's Canadian Open Championships, Toronto CAN: Champion. F d. Virginia Wade 6–3 6–1**
- US Open Championships, New York USA: 3RD Lost Pam Teeguarden 5–7 1–6
- **Australian Hardcourt Championships, Melbourne AUS: Champion. F d. Patricia Coleman 6–7 6–2 6–2**
- **Queensland Grass Court Championships, Brisbane AUS: Champion. F d. Glynis Coles 6–0 7–5**
- Western Australia Championships, Perth AUS: Final Lost Margaret Court 3–6 2–6
- **South Australia Championships, Adelaide AUS: Champion. F d. Kerry Harris 6–1 6–2**

1973 (Won 13 of 29 Tournaments)

- Australian Open Championships, Melbourne. Final Lost Margaret Court 6–4 7–5
- New South Wales Grass Court Championships, Sydney AUS: Final Lost Margaret Court 6–4 3–6 8–10
- **New Zealand Championships, Christchurch: Champion. F d. Janet Young 7–6 6–2**
- **Auckland Championships, NZ: Champion. F d. Marilyn Pryde 6–0 6–1**
- **New South Wales Hardcourt Championships, Sydney AUS: Champion. F d. Dianne Fromholtz**
- S & H Green Stamp Classic, Ft. Lauderdale, Florida USA: Semi Final Lost Virginia Wade 6–7 3–6
- Maureen Connolly International (Virginia Slims), Dallas TX USA: Final Lost Virginia Wade 4–6 1–6
- **US Women's Indoor Championships, Hingham MA: Champion. F d. Virginia Wade 6–4 6–4**
- Akron Open, Ohio USA: 1RD Lost Marita Redondo 3–6 5–7
- Sarasota Open, Florida USA: Final Lost Chris Evert 3–6 2–6
- Miami Beach Women's Pros, Florida USA: Final Lost Chris Evert 6–3 3–6 2–6
- St Petersburg Masters, Florida USA: Final Lost Chris Evert 2–6 6–0 4–6
- British Hard Court Championships, Bournemouth UK: Final Lost Virginia Wade 4–6 4–6
- French Open Championships, Paris FRA: Semi Final Lost Margaret Court 3–6 6–7
- **Italian Open Championships, Rome ITA: Champion. F d. Chris Evert 7–6 6–0**
- **Mercedes Benz Open, Lee-On-Solent UK: Champion. F d. Pat Pretorius 6–3 6–2**
- Rothman's Championships, Queen's Club London UK: Final Lost Olga Morozova 2–6 3–6
- Wimbledon Championships, London UK: Semi Final Lost Billie Jean King 3–6 7–5 3–6
- Düsseldorf Open, GER: Final Lost Helga Masthoff 4–6 4–6
- **Head Austrian Open Championships, Kitzbühel: Champion. F not played. Title split with Olga Morozova**
- **Czech International Championships, Prague: Champion. F d. Renáta Tomanová 6–3 6–3**
- **Western Championships, Cincinnati OH USA: Champion. F d. Chris Evert 6–2 7–5**
- **Canadian Open Championships: Champion. F d. Helga Masthoff 7–6 6–4**
- US Open Championships, New York USA: Final Lost Margaret Court 5–7 7–5 2–6
- **Four Roses Classic, Charlotte NC USA: Champion. F d. Eugenia Birioukova 6–2 6–0**
- Osaka Open, Japan. TBD
- **Japan Open, Tokyo. Champion. F d. Helga Masthoff 7–6 6–3**
- South African Open, Johannesburg. Final Lost Chris Evert 6–3 6–3
- **West Australia Championships, Perth: Champion. F d. Kerry Harris 7–5 6–1**

1974 (Won 7 of 18 tournaments)

- **Australian Open Championships, Melbourne: Champion. F d. Chris Evert 7–6 4–6 6–0**
- New South Wales Open, Sydney AUS: Final Lost Karen Krantzcke 2–6 3–6
- **New Zealand Grass Court Championships, Auckland. Champion. F d. Ann Kiyomura 6–2 6–1**
- **New Zealand Hardcourt Championships, Whangerei: Champion. F d. Margaret Michel 6–4 6–4**
- Virginia Slims Sarasota, Florida USA: Final Lost Chris Evert 6–4 6–0
- Virginia Slims St. Petersburg, Florida USA: Semi Final Lost Kerry Melville 5–7 4–6
- Virginia Slims Philadelphia, Pennsylvania USA: 2RD Lost Helen Gourlay 3–6 6–3 6–7
- Family Circle Cup, Hilton Head SC USA: Semi Final Lost Kerry Melville 3–6 6–3 6–4
- Wimbledon Championships, London UK: Quarter Final Lost Kerry Melville 7–9 6–1 2–6
- US Open Championships, New York USA: Final Lost Billie Jean King 6–3 3–6 5–7
- **Virginia Slims Denver, Colorado USA: Champion. F d. Chris Evert 7–5 3–6 6–4**
- Virginia Slims Houston, Texas USA: Final Defaulted Chris Evert
- Virginia Slime Philadelphia, Pennsylvania USA: 1RD Lost Wendy Overton
- **Virginia Slims Championships, Los Angeles CA USA: Champion. Final d. Chris Evert 6–3 6–4**
- World Invitational Classic, Hilton Head USA: Semi Final Lost Chris Evert 6–2 6–1
- **Queensland Grass Court Championships, AUS: Champion. F d. Pam Doerner 6–1 6–2**
- South Australia Championships, Adelaide AUS: Semi Final Lost Olga Morozova 2–6 6–3 6–8
- **New South Wales Championships, Sydney AUS: Champion. F d. Margaret Court 6–3 7–5**

1975 (Won 4 of 19 tournaments)

- **Australian Open, Melbourne AUS: Champion. F d. Martina Navratilova 6–3 6–2**
- **New Zealand Open, Auckland: Champion. F d. Linda Mottram 6–2 7–5**
- Virginia Slims Chicago, Illinois USA: Quarter Final Lost Wendy Overton 3–6 4–6
- **Virginia Slims Detroit, Michigan USA: Champion. F d. Margaret Court 6–3 3–6 6–3**
- Virginia Slims Boston, Massachusetts USA: Final Lost Martina Navratilova 2–6 6–4 3–6
- Virginia Slims Houston, Texas USA: Semi Final Lost Chris Evert 6–4 4–6 6–7
- Virginia Slims Dallas, Texas USA: Semi Final Lost Martina Navratilova 6–3 3–6 2–6
- Virginia Slims Philadelphia, Pennsylvania USA: Quarter Final Lost Virginia Wade 4–6 0–6
- Virginia Slims Championships, Los Angeles CA USA: Semi Final Lost Chris Evert 1–6 4–6 / 4th place Lost Virginia Wade 5–8
- L'eggs Four Women World Series, Austin TX USA: Semi Final Lost Billie Jean King / 3rd place d. Olga Morozova 2‐6 6‐3 6‐3
- Family Circle Cup, Amelia Island USA: Semi Final Lost Chris Evert 1–6 1–6
- Wimbledon Championships, London UK: Final Lost Billie Jean King 0–6 1–6
- US Open Championships, New York NY: Final Lost Chris Evert 7–5 4–6 2–6
- World Invitational Classic, Hilton Head Island USA: Final Lost Chris Evert 1–6 1–6
- US Indoor Championships, Charlotte NC USA: Final Lost Martina Navratilova 6–4 2–6 5–7
- French Indoor Championships, Paris. Quarter Final Lost Sue Barker 2–6 5–7
- Dewar Cup, London UK: Final Lost Virginia Wade 3–6 2–6
- Dewar Cup, Perth AUS: Final Lost Virginia Wade 3–6 1–6
- **New South Wales Open, Sydney AUS: Champion. F d. Sue Barker 6–2 6–4**

1976 (Won 8 of 14 tournaments)

- **Australian Open, Melbourne AUS: Champion. F d. Renáta Tomanová 6–3 6–2**
- L'eggs World Series, Austin TX USA: Final Lost Chris Evert 3–6 2–6
- **Virginia Slims Chicago, Illinois USA: Champion. F d. Virginia Wade 3–6 6–4 6–2**
- **Virginia Slims Akron, Ohio USA: Champion. F d. Virginia Wade 6–2 3–6 6–2**
- Virginia Slims Sarasota, Florida USA: Final Lost Chris Evert 3–6 0–6
- Virginia Slims San Francisco, California USA: Final Lost Chris Evert 5–7 6–7
- **Virginia Slims Dallas, Texas USA: Champion. F d. Martina Navratilova 6–1 6–1**
- **Virginia Slims Boston, Massachusetts USA: Champion. F d. Virginia Wade 6–2 6–0**
- **Virginia Slims Philadelphia, Pennsylvania USA: Champion. F d. Chris Evert 6–3 7–6**
- **Virginia Slims Championships, Los Angeles CA USA: Champion. F d. Chris Evert 6–3 5–7 6–3**
- Wimbledon, London UK: Final Lost Chris Evert 3–6 6–4 6–8
- US Open, New York USA: Final Lost Chris Evert 3–6 0–6
- **World Invitational Tennis Classic, Hilton Head Island USA. Champion. F d. Virginia Wade 6–3 6–4**
- Colgate New South Wales Championships, Sydney AUS: Quarter Final Lost Dianne Fromholtz

1977 (Won 4 of 6 tournaments)

- Player's Canadian Open, Toronto QB: First Round Lost Katja Ebbinghaus 4–6 7–5 4–6
- World Invitational Tennis Classic, Hilton Head, USA: Final Lost Virginia Wade 3–6 7–6 3–6 / 3rd place d. Kerry Reid 6–4 7–6
- **Colgate International, Sydney AUS: Champion. F d. Kerry Melville Reid 6–1 6–3**
- **Toyota Classic, Melbourne AUS: Champion. F d. Wendy Turnbull 6–4 6–1**
- **Marlboro New South Wales Open, Sydney AUS: Champion. F d. Sue Barker 6–2 6–3**
- **Australian Open, Melbourne: Champion. F d. Helen Gourlay Cawley 6–3 6–0**

1978 (Won 6 of 12 tournaments)

- **Virginia Slims Hollywood, Florida USA: Champion. F d. Wendy Turnbull 6–2 6–3**
- Virginia Slims Chicago, Illinois USA: Final Lost Martina Navratilova 7–6 2–6 2–6
- Virginia Slims Detroit, Michigan USA: Quarter Final Lost Dianne Fromholtz 2–6 1–6
- Virginia Slims Kansas, Missouri USA: Quarter Final Lost Billie Jean King 2–6 3–6
- **Virginia Slims Dallas, Texas USA: Champion. F d. Tracy Austin 4–6 6–0 6–2**
- **Virginia Slims Boston, Massachusetts USA: Champion. F d. Chris Evert 4–6 6–1 6–4**
- Virginia Slims Championships, Oakland CA USA: Final Lost Martina Navratilova 7–6 6–4
- **Surrey Grass Court Championship, Surbiton UK: Champion. F d. Winnie Wooldridge 6–1 6–1**
- **Kent Championships, Beckenham UK: Champion. F d. Laura duPont 6–4 6–2**
- **Keith Prowse International, Chichester UK: Champion. F d. Pam Teeguarden 6–4 6–4**
- Wimbledon, London UK: Semi Final Lost Martina Navratilova 6–2 4–6 4–6
- Emeron Cup, Tokyo Japan: Group Lost Martina Navratilova 3–6 2–6 / Lost Virginia Wade 6–7 4–6

Goolagong entered both the Virginia Slims Seattle and the Florida Federal tournaments, but withdrew before any matches were played.

1979 (Won 4 of 13 tournaments)

- Family Circle Cup, Amelia Island, USA: Semi Final Lost Tracy Austin 0–6 1–6
- Italian Open, Rome, Italy: Semi Final Lost Sylvia Hanika 5–7 6–3 5–7
- German Open, W Berlin: Semi Final Lost Regina Maršíková 2–6 6–3 3–6
- **Crossley Carpets Trophy, Chichester, UK: Champion. F d. Sue Barker 6–1 6–4**
- **Kentish Times Championships, Beckenham, UK: Champion. F d. Pam Shriver 6–3 6–2**
- Wimbledon, UK: Semi Final Lost Chris Evert 3–6 2–6
- US Clay Court Championships, Indianapolis: Final Lost Christ Evert 4–6 3–6
- US Open Championships, New York: Quarter Final Lost Chris Evert 5–7 2–6
- Toray Sillook Open, Tokyo, Japan: Final Lost Billie Jean King 4–6 5–7
- Davison's Tennis Classic (Virginia Slims), Atlanta USA: Semi Final Lost Martina Navratilova 1–6 3–6
- **US Indoor Championships, Minneapolis USA: Champion. F d. Dianne Fromholtz 6–3 6–4**
- **Florida Federal Open, Tampa USA: Champion. F d. Virginia Wade 6–0 6–3**
- Toyota Classic, Melbourne AUS: Defaulted R16 Mimi Wikstedt (not contested)

1980 (Won 1 of 15 tournaments)

- Virginia Slims Washington, D.C., USA: Group Lost Martina Navratilova 3–6 2–6 / d. Regina Maršíková 6–1 6–1 / Lost Wendy Turnbull 1–2 (retired)
- Virginia Slims Kansas City, Missouri USA: Quarter Final Lost Greer Stevens 6–7 1–6
- Virginia Slims Chicago, Illinois USA: R16 Lost Sylvia Hanika 4–6 7–6 4–6
- Avon Championships California, Oakland USA: Final Lost Martina Navratilova 1–6 6–7
- Virginia Slims Detroit, Michigan USA: Final lost Billie Jean King 3–6 0–6
- Virginia Slims Dallas, Texas USA: Final Lost Martina Navratilova 3–6 2–6
- Avon Boston, Massachusetts, USA: 1RD Lost JoAnne Russell 6–4 5–7 1–6
- Avon Championship Finals, New York USA: Semi Final lost Martina Navratilova 2–6 6–3 0–6
- Clairol Crown, Carlsbad CA USA: Semi Final lost Tracy Austin 4–6 3–6 / 3rd place d. Billie Jean King 6–0 6–3
- Crossley Carpets Championships, Chichester UK: Final lost Chris Evert 3–6 7–6 5–7
- **Wimbledon, UK: Champion F d. Chris Evert 6–1 7–6**
- US Clay Court Championships, Indianapolis: Semi Final lost Andrea Jaeger 4–6 2–6
- Player's Canadian Open Championships, Toronto QB. Quarter Final Lost Kathy Jordan 6–7 0–6
- Lion Cup Japan: Group Lost Chris Evert 3–6 3–6 / Lost Tracy Austin 4–6 0–6
- Australian Open, Melbourne: R32 Lost Mima Jaušovec 2–6 6–4 4–6

1981 (Won 0 of 3 tournaments)

- Perth Championships, Australia: R16 Lost Jane Preyer 3–6 3–6
- Sydney Open, Australia: Quarter Final Lost Chris Evert 2–6 0–6
- Australian Open, Melbourne: Quarter Final Lost Martina Navratilova 3–6 1–6

1982 (Won 0 of 9 tournaments)

- Citizen Cup, Amelia Island FL USA: Semi Final Lost Chris Evert 7–5 1–6 4–6 / 3rd place d. Hana Mandlíková 6–2 6–2
- Family Circle Cup, Hilton Head SC USA: 1RD Lost JoAnne Russell 6–4 2–6 0–1 (retired)
- Dow Classic, Edgbaston UK: R64 Lost Pam Teeguarden 4–6 6–2 3–6
- Wimbledon, UK: R64 Lost Zina Garrison 4–6 2–6
- Australian Indoor Championships, Sydney: Group Lost Chris Evert 3–6 1–6 / Lost Andrea Jaeger 4–6 1–6 / d. Sylvia Hanika 6–3 6–4
- Australian Challenge International, Perth: 1RD Lost Andrea Jaeger 1–6 3–6
- Brisbane Championships, Australia: R64 Lost Sue Barker 1–6 3–6
- Sydney Open, Australia: Final lost Martina Navratilova 2–6 6–3 1–6
- Australian Open, Melbourne: R32 Lost Candy Reynolds 6–2 4–6 5–7

1983 (Won 0 of 8 tournaments)

- Marco Island Championships, Florida USA: R32 Lost Leigh Thompson 0–6 5–7
- Virginia Slims Championships, New York USA: Group Lost Pam Shriver 1–6 3–6
- Family Circle Cup, Hilton Head SC USA: R32 Lost Zina Garrison 5–7 3–6
- Ponte Vedra Beach Championships, Florida USA: R16 Lost Raffaella Reggi 3–6 3–6
- Italian Open, Rome: R32 Lost Christine Jolissaint 4–6 2–6
- Swiss Open, Lugano: Quarter Final abandoned v Bettina Bunge
- French Open, Paris: R32 Lost Chris Evert 2–6 2–6
- Dow Classic, Edgbaston UK: R16 Lost Anne White 2–6 5–7

1985 (Won 0 of 1 tournament)

- Australian Indoor Championships, Sydney: 1RD lost Amanda Tobin-Evans 3–6 2–6

== Rivalries ==
Every Grand Slam singles champion from 1962 to 1986 was an active player at some point during Goolagong-Cawley's career. Of these eighteen other players (excluding Evonne herself), she never played a competitive singles match against either Maria Bueno or Karen Hantze-Susman. Of the other sixteen, she scored at least one victory over all these opponents throughout her career, with the exception of Ann Haydon-Jones. Jones won all three of their competitive matches from 1969 to 1971.

Head to head statistics of main rivals

- Billie Jean King: Grand Slam Wins 1 – Losses 6. Total Career Wins 4 – Losses 13^.
- Chris Evert: Grand Slam Wins 4 – Losses 6. Total Career Wins 13 – Losses 26.
  1972 Wimbledon SF W 4–6, 6–3, 6–4
  1972 Bonnie Belle Cup F L 3–6, 6–4, 0–6
  1972 Indianapolis, Indiana F L 6–7, 1–6
  1973 Sarasota, Florida F L 3–6, 2–6
  1973 Miami Beach, Florida F L 6–3, 3–6, 2–6
  1973 St. Petersburg, Florida F L 2–6, 6–0, 4–6
  1973 Italian Open F W 7–6, 6–0
  1973 Bonnie Belle Cup RR W 6–4, 6–3
  1973 Cincinnati, Ohio F W 6–2, 7–5
  1973 Johannesburg, South Africa F L 3–6, 3–6
  1974 Australian Open F W 7–6, 4–6, 6–0
  1974 Sarasota F L 4–6, 0–6
  1974 U.S. Open SF W 6–0, 6–7, 6–3
  1974 Denver F W 7–5, 3–6, 6–4
  1974 Virginia Slims Championships F W 6–3, 6–4
  1974 Hilton Head, South Carolina SF L 2–6, 1–6
  1975 Boston, Massachusetts SF W 2–6, 6–4, 6–2
  1975 Houston, Texas SF L 6–4, 4–6, 6–7
  1975 Virginia Slims Championships SF L 1–6, 4–6
  1975 Amelia Island, Florida SF L 1–6, 1–6
  1975 U.S. Open F L 7–5, 4–6, 2–6
  1975 Hilton Head, South Carolina F L 1–6, 1–6
  1976 Austin, Texas F L 5–7, 1–6
  1976 Sarasota, Florida F L 3–6, 0–6
  1976 San Francisco F L 5–7, 6–7
  1976 Philadelphia F W 6–3, 7–6
  1976 Slims Championships/L.A. F W 6–3, 5–7, 6–3
  1976 Wimbledon F L 3–6, 6–4, 6–8
  1976 U.S. Open F L 3–6, 0–6
  1978 Boston F W 4–6, 6–1, 6–4
  1979 Wimbledon SF L 3–6, 2–6
  1979 Indianapolis F L 4–6, 3–6
  1979 U.S. Open QF L 5–7, 2–6
  1980 Chichester, England F L 3–6, 7–6, 5–7
  1980 Wimbledon F W 6–1, 7–6
  1980 Tokyo Lion (Emerson) Cup SF L 4–6, 0–6
  1981 Sydney, Australia QF L 2–6, 0–6
  1982 Palm Beach Gardens SF L 7–5, 1–6, 4–6
  1983 French Open 3R L 2–6, 2–6
- Virginia Wade: Grand Slam Wins 5 – Losses 1. Total Career Wins 30 – Losses 10.
- Martina Navratilova: Grand Slam Wins 2 – Losses 2. Total Career Wins 12 – Losses 15.
  1973 Hingham, Massachusetts, USA 1R W 6–4 6–4
  1973 Sarasota, Florida, USA 1R W 6–2 6–1
  1973 French Open QF W 7–6 6–4
  1973 Bratislava, Czechoslovakia SF W 6–3 7–5
  1973 Charlotte, N.C., USA SF W 6–2 6–3
  1975 Australian Open F W 6–3 6–2
  1975 Detroit, USA SF W 7–6 6–3
  1975 Boston, USA F L 2–6 6–4 3–6
  1975 Dallas, USA SF L 6–3 3–6 2–6
  1975 Federation Cup F L 3–6 4–6
  1975 Charlotte, N.C., USA F L 6–4 2–6 5–7
  1976 Chicago, USA SF W 7–6 6–2
  1976 Sarasota, Florida, USA SF W 6–4 6–1
  1976 Dallas, USA F W 6–1 6–1
  1976 Virginia Slims Championships RR W 6–4 7–5
  1978 Chicago, USA F L 7–6 2–6 2–6
  1978 Boston, USA SF W 7–6 7–6
  1978 Virginia Slims Championships F L 6–7 4–6
  1978 Wimbledon SF L 6–2 4–6 4–6
  1978 Tokyo, Japan 1R L 3–6 2–6
  1979 Atlanta, USA SF L 1–6 3–6
  1980 Colgate Series Championships RR L 3–6 2–6
  1980 Oakland, California, USA F L 1–6 6–7
  1980 Dallas, USA F L 3–6 2–6
  1980 Avon Championships SF L 2–6 6–3 0–6
  1981 Australian Open QF L 3–6 1–6
  1982 Sydney, Australia F L 0–6 6–3 1–6
- Rosie Casals: Grand Slam Wins 2 – Losses 0. Total Career Wins 12 – Losses 1.
- Margaret Court: Grand Slam Wins 2 – Losses 6. Total Career Wins 4 – Losses 16^.
- Tracy Austin: Grand Slam Wins 1 – Losses 0. Total Career Wins 4 – Losses 4.
- Sue Barker: Grand Slam Wins 1 – Losses 0. Total Career Wins 7 – Losses 2.
- Wendy Turnbull: Grand Slam Wins 1 – Losses 0. Total Career Wins 5 – Losses 0.
- Françoise Dürr: Grand Slam Wins 2 – Losses 0. Total Career Wins 3 – Losses 0.
- Helen Gourlay: Grand Slam Wins 4 – Losses 0. Total Career Wins 5 – Losses 0^.
- Andrea Jaeger: Grand Slam Wins 0 - Losses 0. Total Career Wins 1 - Losses 3.
- ^Incomplete data available.
