= International Amphitheatre =

Arena in Chicago, Illinois, United States

- A postcard of the venue from 1953
- Interactive map of International Amphitheatre
- Address: 4220 South Halsted Street; Chicago, Illinois 60609; United States
- Coordinates: 41°48′58″N 87°38′46″W
- Owner: Union Stock Yard and Transit Company (until 1983)
- Capacity: 9,000

Construction
- Opened: December 1, 1934
- Closed: 1999
- Demolished: August 3, 1999 (began)
- Cost: $1.5 million ($36.1 million in 2025 dollars)
- Architect: Abraham Epstein

Tenants
- Chicago American Gears (NBL/PBLA) (1944–1948); Chicago Packers (NBA) (1961–1962); Chicago Majors (ABL) (1961–1963); Chicago Bulls (NBA) (1966–1967); Chicago Cougars (WHA) (1972–1975); Chicago Sting (NASL) (1976); Loyola Ramblers basketball (NCAA D-I) (1987–1989)

The International Amphitheatre was an indoor arena located in Chicago, Illinois, United States, that opened in 1934 and was demolished in 1999. It was located on the west side of Halsted Street, at 42nd Street, on the city's south side, in the Canaryville neighborhood, adjacent to the Union Stock Yards.

== History ==
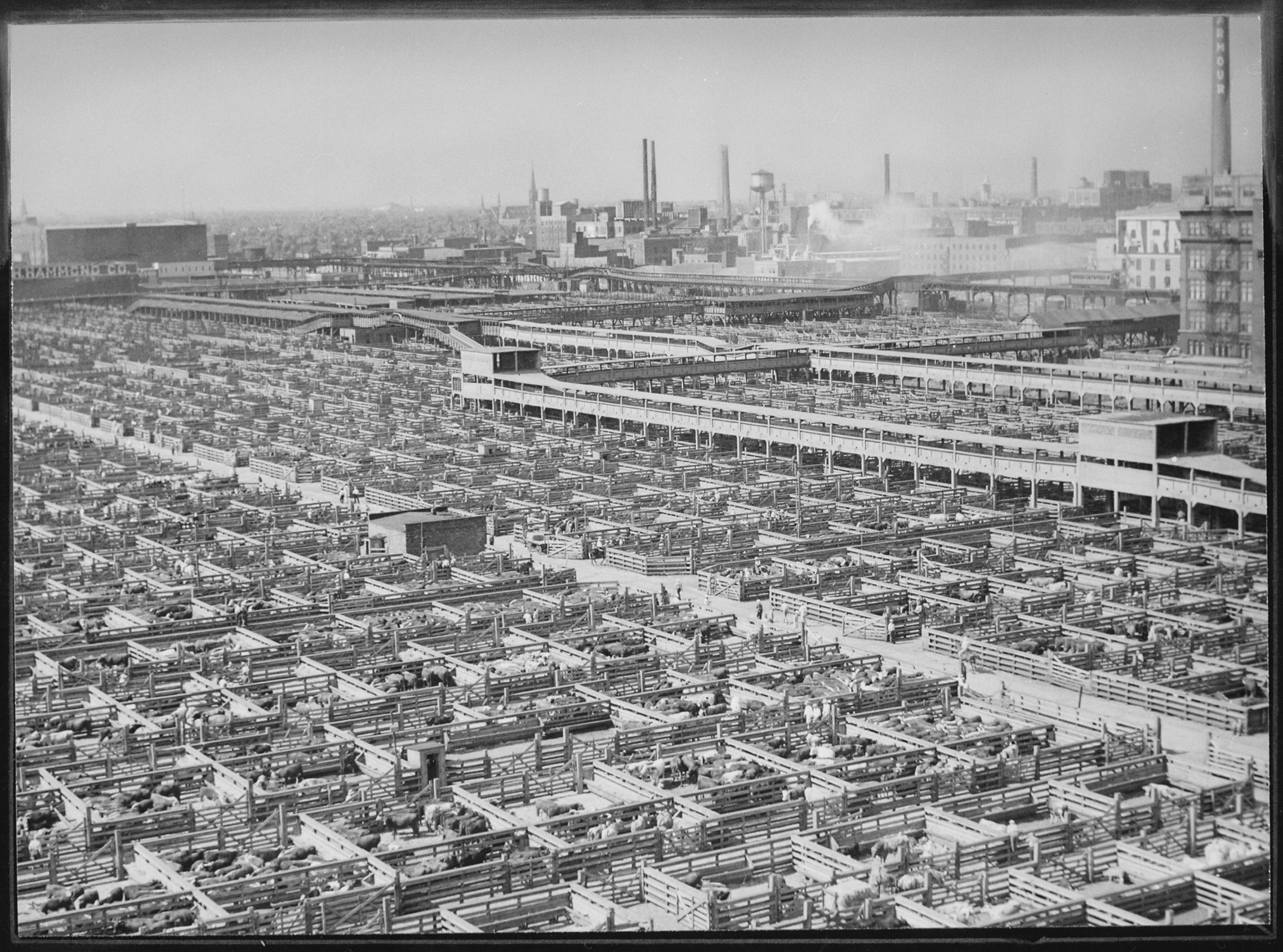
The Amphitheatre was adjacent to the Union Stock Yards

The Amphitheatre opened on November 30, 1934. It was built for $1.5 million by the Stock Yard company principally to host the International Livestock Exhibition. The arena replaced Dexter Park, a horse track that stood on the site for over 50 years until destroyed by fire in 1934. The completion of the Amphitheatre ushered in an era where Chicago reigned as a convention capital. In an era before air conditioning and space for press and broadcast media were commonplace, the International Amphitheatre was among the first arenas to be equipped with these innovations.

The Stock Yards closed in 1971, but the Amphitheatre continued to host rock concerts, college basketball, local high school playoff games, circuses, religious gatherings, and other events. However, the loss of conventions and trade shows to the modern and conveniently located McCormick Place convention center in the 1960s and 1970s, started the Amphitheatre's decline, which increased as other convention and concert venues in the area drew events away. By the 1980s, the venue struggled to compete with such facilities as Chicago Stadium, the Rosemont Horizon, the Arie Crown Theater, the Alpine Valley Music Theatre, the Holiday Star Theatre, the UIC Pavilion, and the renovated Chicago Theatre.

In the late 1970s, developer Harry Chaddick proposed replacing the Amphitheatre with a shopping center, but these plans ended when Mayor Michael Bilandic revoked his support after residents and political leaders in the Canaryville and Bridgeport neighborhoods complained that such a development would lead to intense vehicular traffic as well as attract residents from nearby Chicago Housing Authority projects.

After an automobile swap show in 1983, the venue closed. It was sold to new owners for $250,000 and sat dormant. For the next three years, plans were floated to convert it into a sound stage. But on November 28, 1987, the International Amphitheatre reopened with a game by the Loyola Ramblers college basketball team, who became full-time tenants after repairs and improvements were made. A further $5 million renovation was planned, and it was intended that Loyola basketball would remain tenants for at least five years. However, in 1989, Loyola moved to the Rosemont Horizon after the team drew as few as 500 spectators to its games at the Amphitheatre.

The sprawling venue was difficult to maintain and struggled to attract enough events to pay for its upkeep. After passing through the hands of multiple owners, including the city, demolition commenced in August of 1999. An Aramark Uniform Services plant is located on the site once occupied by the Amphitheatre. Part of the former convention hall extension still remains standing and is occupied by Lakeshore Beverage.

== Events and tenants ==
The North American International Livestock Exposition was held at the arena until several years after the Union Stock Yards closed in July 1971, when it relocated to Louisville, Kentucky.

=== Presidential nominating conventions ===
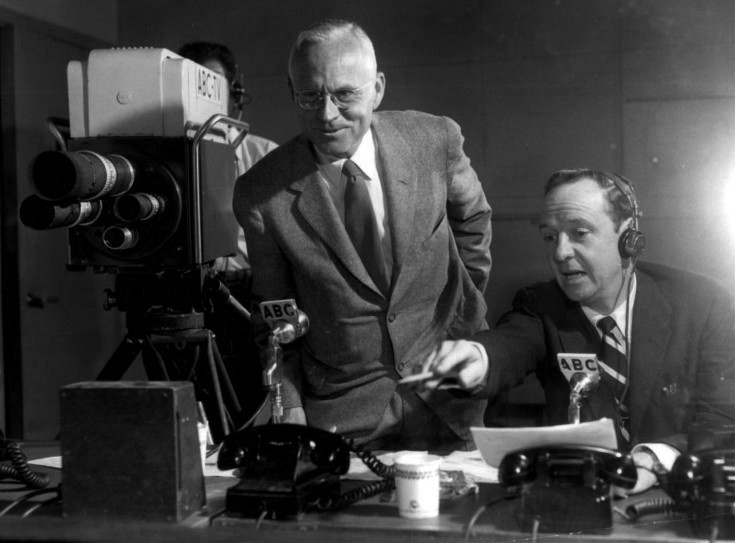
John Daly and Quincy Howe providing CBS' coverage of the 1952 political conventions

The Amphitheatre hosted several national American presidential nominating conventions, with an overall record of 1-4:

- 1952 Republican National Convention (nominated Dwight D. Eisenhower for President and Richard M. Nixon for Vice President; ticket won)
- 1952 Democratic National Convention (nominated Adlai E. Stevenson for President and John J. Sparkman for Vice President; ticket lost)
- 1956 Democratic National Convention (nominated Adlai E. Stevenson for President and Estes Kefauver for Vice President; ticket lost)
- 1960 Republican National Convention (nominated Richard M. Nixon for President and Henry Cabot Lodge Jr. for Vice President; ticket lost)
- 1968 Democratic National Convention (nominated Hubert H. Humphrey for President and Edmund S. Muskie for Vice President; ticket lost)

The 1952 Republican National Convention had the distinction of being the first political convention broadcast live by television coast to coast, with special studio facilities provided for all the major networks.

The 1968 Democratic National Convention was one of the most tumultuous political conventions in American history, noted for anti-war protests.

=== Sports ===
Televised boxing and wrestling were held at the venue for decades, making it well-known across the United States. It was home to Chicago's wrestling scene into the 1980s, and in 1981, Joe Frazier's final boxing match was at the Amphitheatre.

The arena seated 9,000 for sports and was the first home of the Chicago Packers of the NBA in 1961–62, before becoming the Chicago Zephyrs and moving to the Chicago Coliseum for their second season. It was also the home of the Chicago Bulls during their inaugural season in 1966–67. The team played once time at the Chicago Coliseum, a playoff game in their first season, as no other arena was available for a date with the St. Louis Hawks. The Bulls moved permanently to Chicago Stadium, where they remained until 1994, when they relocated to the United Center.

The Amphitheatre was also the primary home of the Chicago Cougars of the WHA from 1972 to 1975. It was originally intended to be a temporary home for the Cougars, but the permanent solution, the Rosemont Horizon, was not completed until 1980, five years after the team folded and a year after the WHA ceased operation.

TNT Motorsports started their 1989 Monster Truck Challenge point season with five shows at the Amphitheatre between April 23 and 25. Grave Digger driven by Dennis Anderson won 4 of the 5 shows. The event was known for several accidents with trucks hitting the wall by the tunnel. USA-1 hit on consecutive races during the first show and Stomper hit the wall on the fourth show.

The Chicago Public League 1991 tournament at the Amphitheatre, won by Marshall High School, was featured in the documentary film Hoop Dreams.

=== Concerts and entertainment ===
Notable performers at the venue included The Rolling Stones, Frank Sinatra, Led Zeppelin, The Who, Pink Floyd, AC/DC, Black Sabbath, Rush, Santana, Selena, Ike & Tina Turner, Grateful Dead, Van Halen, Aerosmith, and The Jackson 5. The Amphitheatre is noted as the site of one of Elvis Presley’s most notable concerts, when the singer wore his legendary gold lamé suit for the first time, in 1957. On September 5, 1964, and August 12, 1966, The Beatles performed at the Amphitheatre. The 1966 show was the first show of what proved to be their last tour.

== Gallery ==
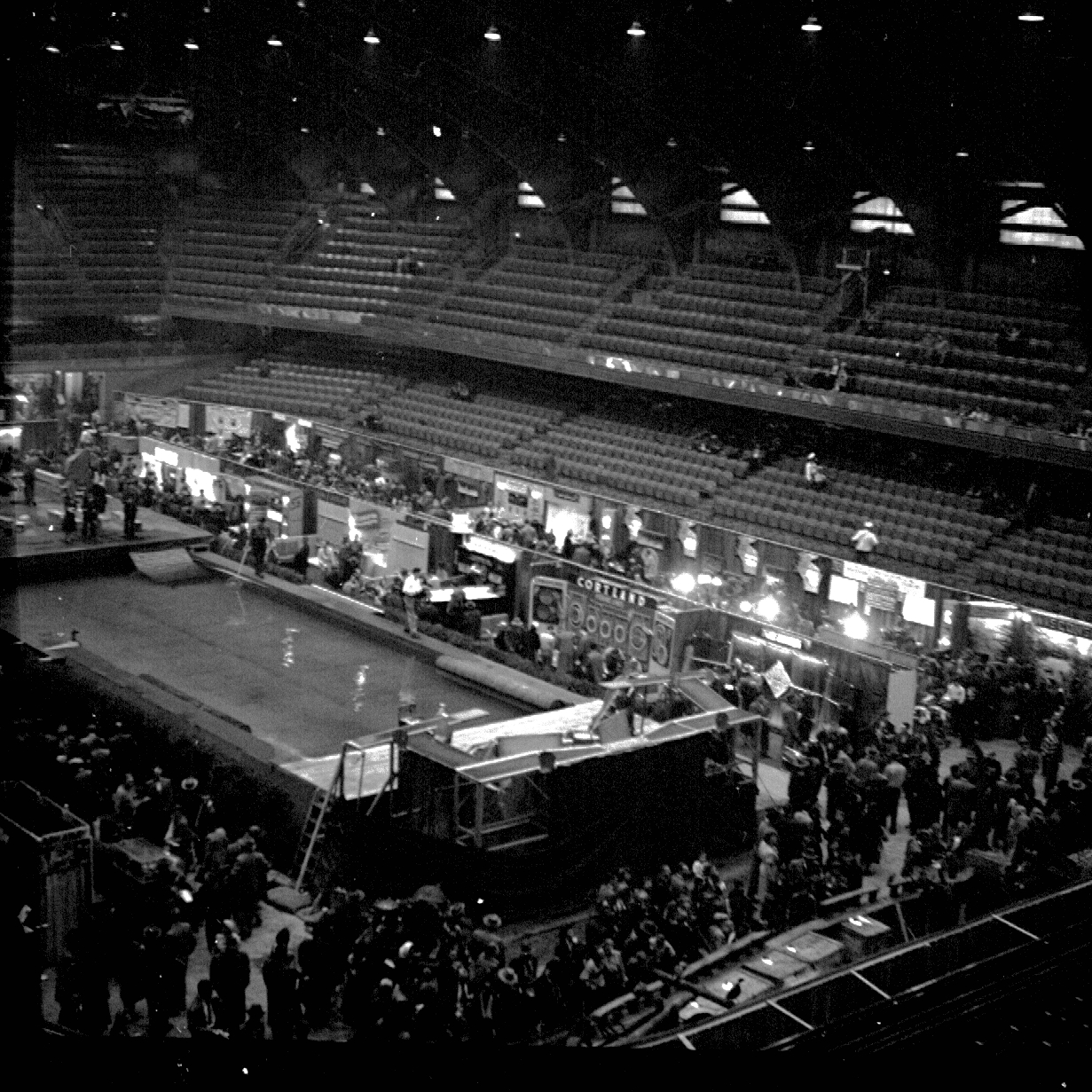
Arena in 1948

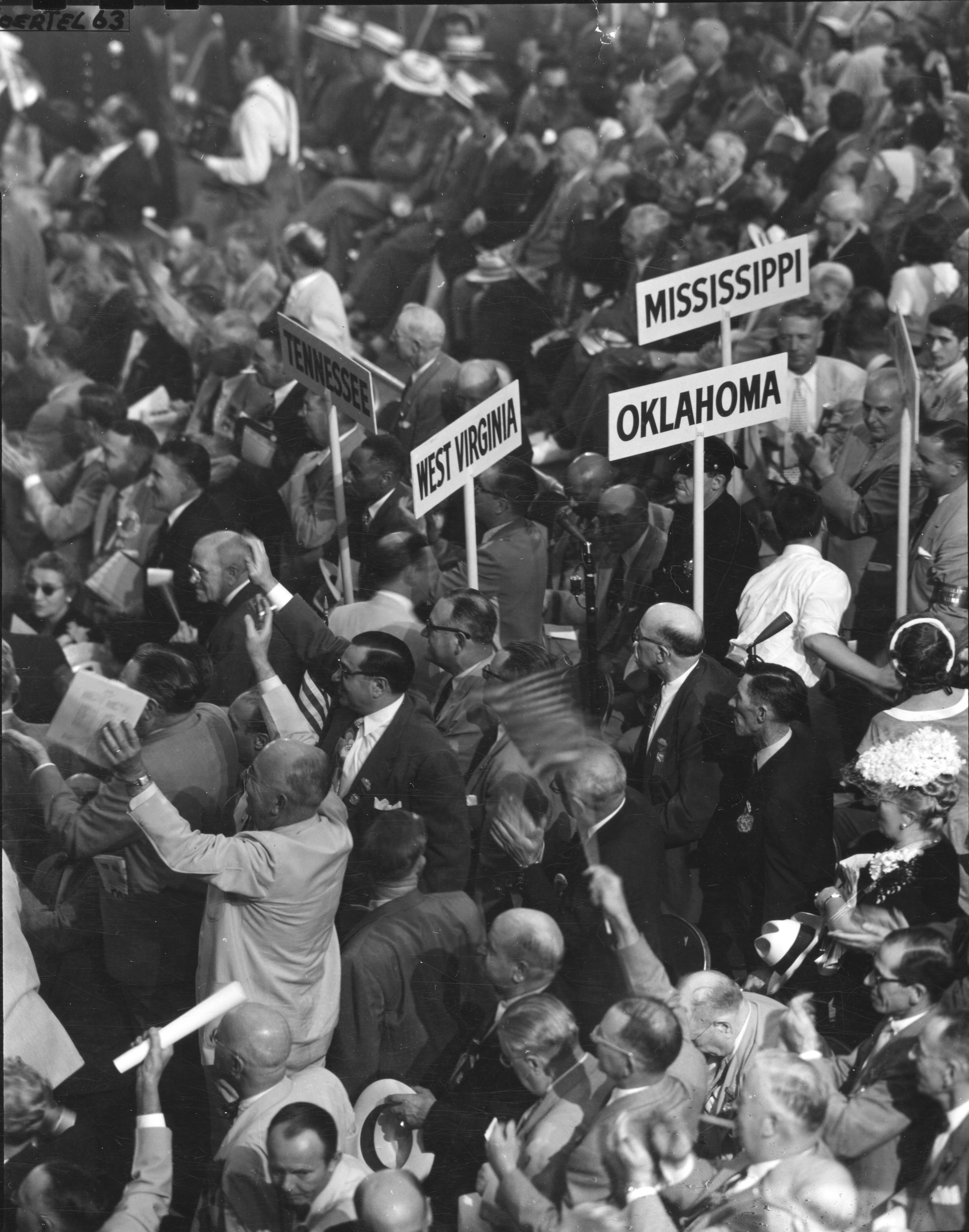
1952 Republican National Convention

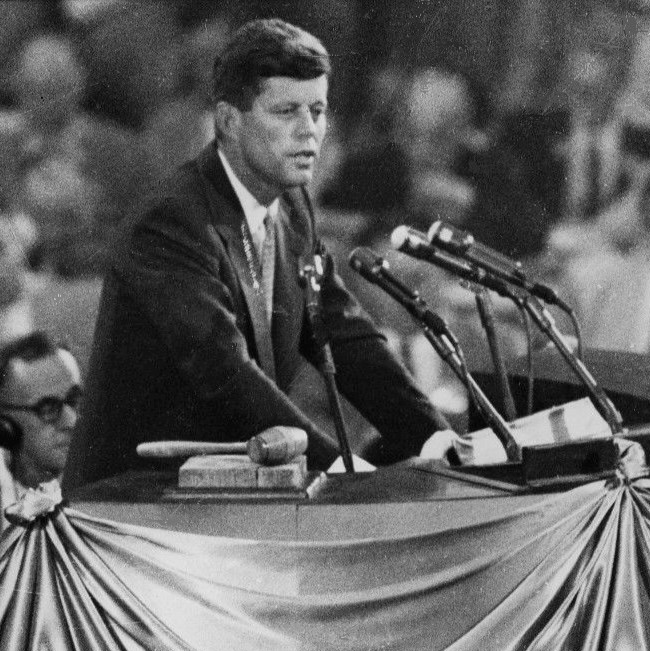
John F. Kennedy nominates Adlai Stevenson at the 1956 Democratic National Convention

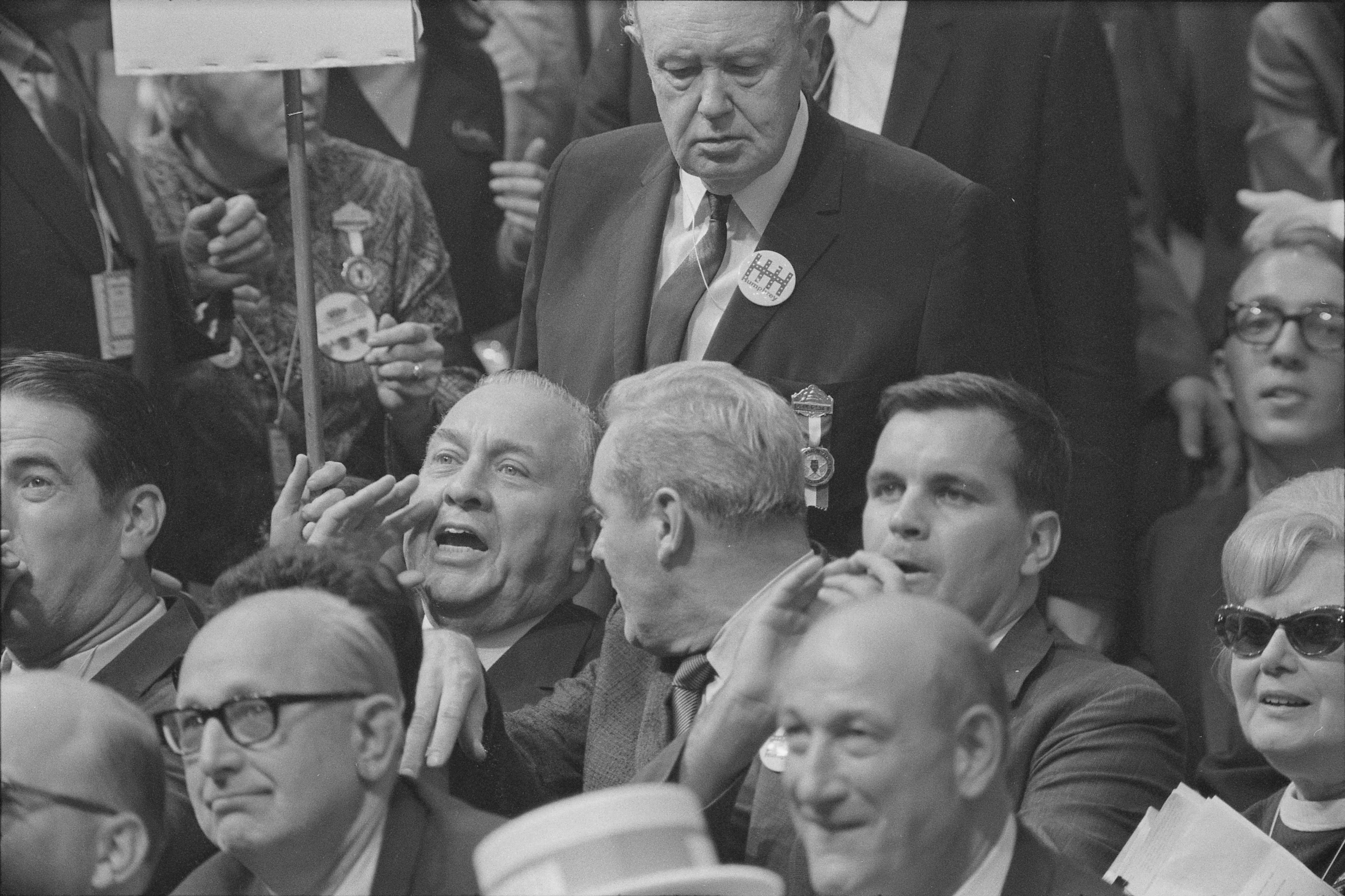
Illinois delegates (including Richard M. Daley and Richard J. Daley) during the 1968 Democratic National Convention

== See also ==
- Logistics of the 1952 Democratic and Republican National Conventions

Events and tenants
| Preceded by first arena | Home of the Chicago Packers; 1961–1962 | Succeeded by Chicago Coliseum |
| Preceded by first arena | Home of the Chicago Bulls; 1966–1967 | Succeeded by Chicago Stadium |
