= Ford City Mall =

Defunct mall in Chicago, Illinois, U.S.

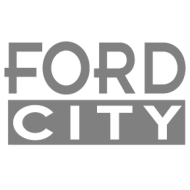

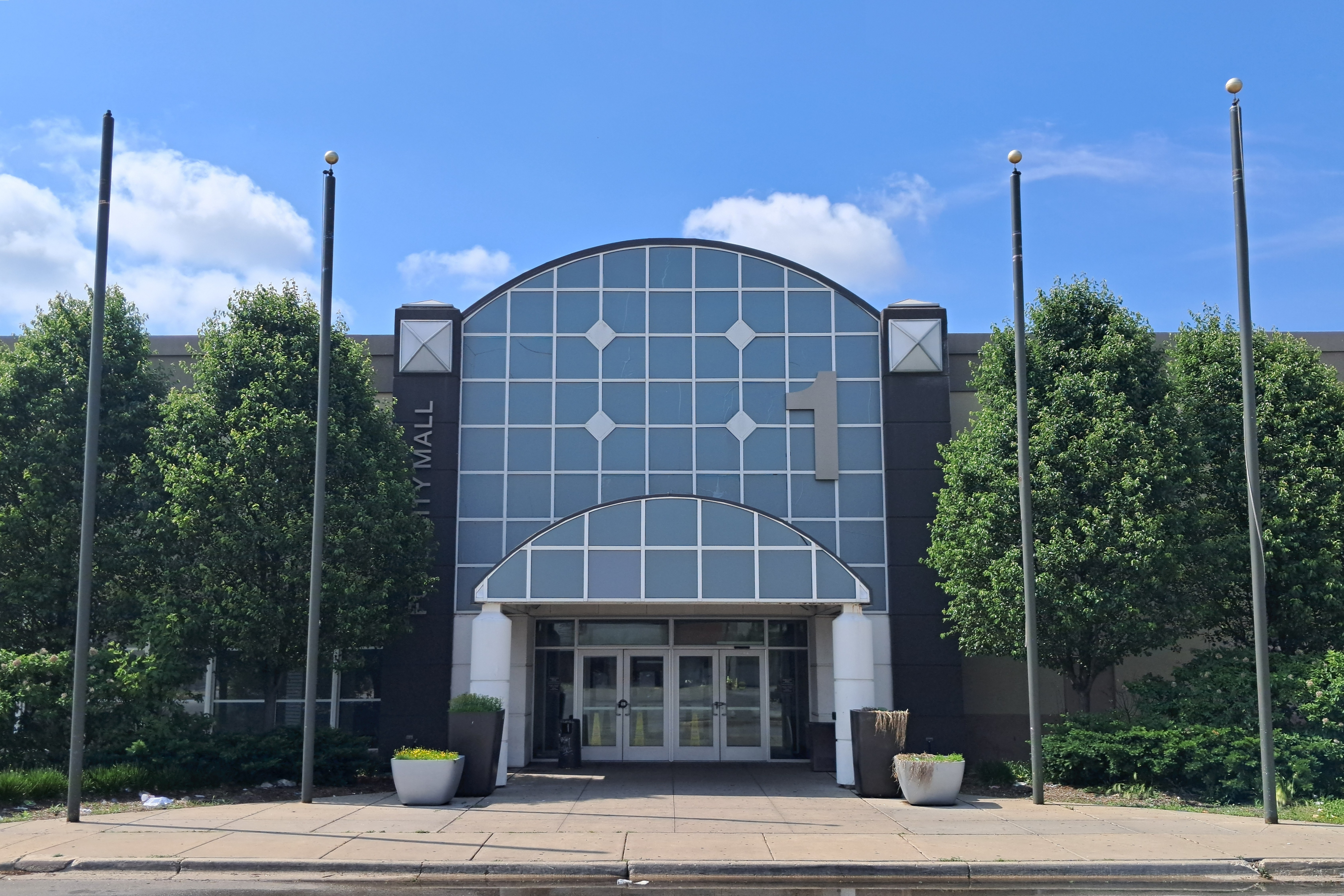
- Main entrance (June 2026)
- Location: Chicago, Illinois, United States
- Coordinates: 41.7556265°N 87.7369237°W
- Opened: 1965; 61 years ago
- Closed: June 22, 2026; 4 months ago
- Developer: Harry Chaddick
- Manager: Namdar Realty Group
- Owner: Namdar Realty Group
- Num. of stores: 135 (approx 63 as of Feb 2025)
- Num. of anchor tenants: 3 (3 closed, 1 demolished)
- Floor area: 1,258,480 square feet (116,916.6 m^{2})
- Floors: 1 with basement (2 in former JCPenney and Carson's)
- Public transit: CTA; Pace
- Website: shopfordcity.com Website no longer maintained (outdated)

Ford City Mall is a defunct mall located on the Southwest Side of Chicago in the West Lawn neighborhood at 76th Street and Cicero Avenue. Opened in 1965, Ford City was the largest shopping mall in Chicago outside of downtown. At its peak, the mall had over 135 stores and 3 anchors. There are several outparcels including a 14-screen AMC Theatres, built off the southeast corner in 1990. Ford City Mall is managed by Namdar Realty Group.

== History ==
Construction started in 1942 to build the Dodge Chicago Plant, a defense plant. Approximately 17,000 workers were employed. This caused the southwest side of the city to become more populated as more people were moving there for work. By October, Building No. 1 was finished. Testing of aircraft engines to be used for the B-29 bomber began. By the spring of 1943, 10 buildings, made of steel, concrete and wood, had been constructed. The building covered approximately 6,000,000 square feet (560,000 m^{2}). The largest building was Building No. 4. It covered 62 acres (250,000 m^{2}), and it was built out of reinforced concrete. The plant contained 7,000 miles (11,000 km) of underground piping and 15 miles (24 km) of cables and wires for water and power.

By December 1945, the plant was left vacant due to the end of World War II; the government attempted to sell it without success. It was later retrofitted for automobile production for Tucker Corporation and then Ford Motor Company. A portion of the plant northwest of the mall became the headquarters of Tootsie Roll Industries.

The building remained a white elephant until the Korean War, when it was reopened to build airplane engines for the war effort, under contract from Ford Motor Company. The Ford company modernized everything inside the building, employing nearly 12,000 people. The building closed again in 1959.

In 1961, the government sold it to Harry F Chaddick, who along with other investors planned to develop a shopping center. Some buildings were torn down to make room for parking lots. The buildings that remained were remodeled to attract retail tenants.

Developers divided the building into a separate portion for the mall. The mall opened in 1965 as Ford City.

The mall consists of two halves - a strip mall on the north and enclosed mall to the south. The strip mall portion is connected to the enclosed mall by a tunnel called "The Connection". It utilizes the basement between the severed halves of the buildings directly below the parking lot. The Connection was originally called Peacock Alley from the early 1970s through the 1980s. Wieboldt's occupied the western-facing space until 1987 when Carson Pirie Scott moved in. A new southern-facing space occupied by Montgomery Ward was built in 1975, lasting until that chain's bankruptcy. That space has since been demolished. JCPenney occupies the eastern facing space. Turn Style had anchored the east end of the strip mall portion until the store was sold and converted to Venture and then to Sears until they closed the store in August 2010. The strip mall was occupied by a General Cinema 3-screen theater (converted to 5 screens in 1987) at its west end until the new AMC theaters were built in 1990, and also included a bowling alley and stores including John M. Smyth Furniture. In the late 1970s, a Farrell's Ice Cream Parlour was located in an offset adjacent to the theaters.

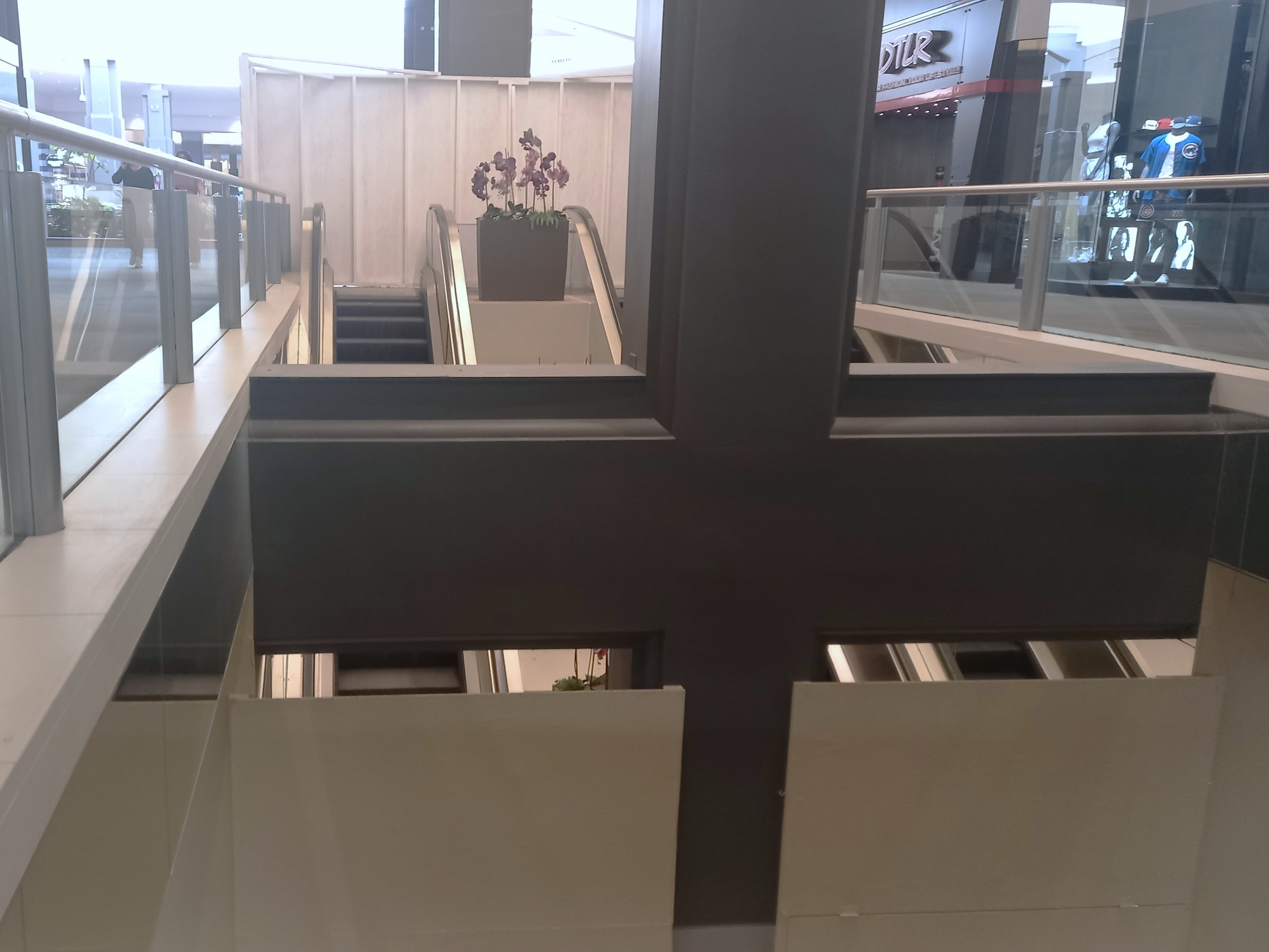
Ford City Mall Connection entrance in May 2025

An additional facility, a strip mall called Ford City East, was built in 1981 at 76th Street and Pulaski Road, just south of Richard J. Daley College; for several years, it included additional movie theaters.

Until February 2008, the mall was managed by General Growth Properties Inc. for a private investment company.

In 2009-2010, Ford City Mall began a multimillion-dollar long term capital redevelopment program undertaking North Mall infrastructure work, Cicero Avenue frontage and North Mall parking lot resurfacing. During this time new tenants such as Conway (later Fallas), U.S. Cellular, Rodeo, Amici, Star Diamond Jewelers, GNC, She Bar, Eldorado Fine Jewelers, Avon, China Max, Sprint, and other stores opened for business at Ford City Mall. In early 2011, for the second phase of the long term capital redevelopment plan, the Cicero Avenue pylon signs were refurbished, giving tenants the ability to gain maximum store signage exposure along heavily trafficked Cicero Avenue.

As part of the 2011 capital redevelopment program, Ford City Mall is in the process of demolishing several small outparcel buildings and a former vacant anchor store, leading the way to future development options under discussion at this time.

In the summer of 2012, Ford City Mall closed part of The Connection and moved all retailers upstairs.

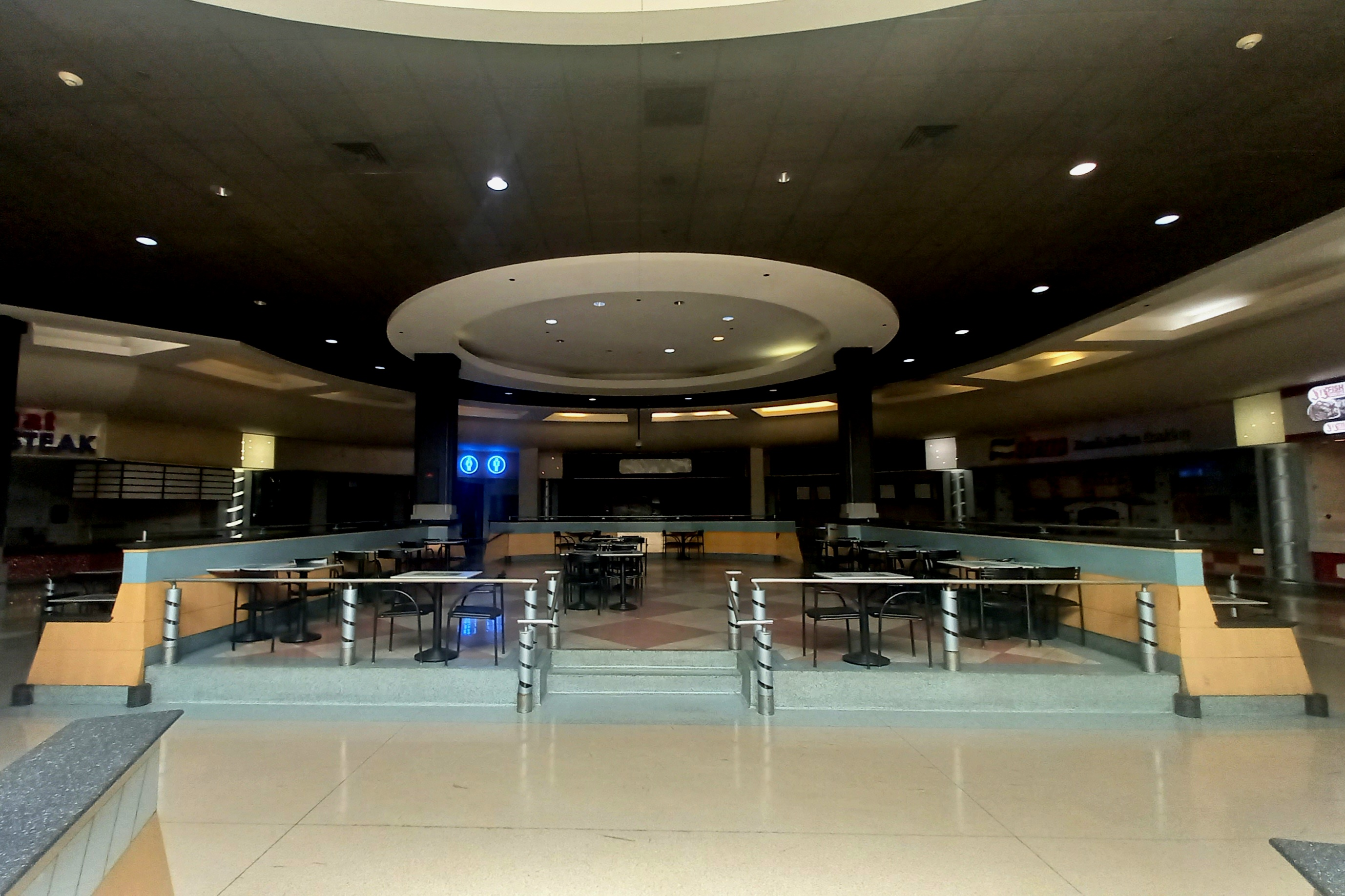
Food court inside Ford City Mall

Ford City's renovation began in 2016. Plans include renovating inside the mall with corridor seating, new lighting and flooring and a newly remodeled food court. Both the Carson's and JCPenney were remodeled. A Five Below located in the North Mall portion opened in September 2016. In addition, there will be several outparcels to be constructed near the southern end of the mall as well as a new CTA transit center to be opened in 2017. An outlot building that houses a Chipotle Mexican Grill and a Mattress Firm opened in 2017. An H&M store opened on August 9, 2018.

On April 18, 2018, Carson's parent company The Bon-Ton Stores, announced that they will close all Carson's locations, including the Ford City location as a result of their bankruptcy. The store closed on August 29, 2018.

In 2020, a Chick-fil-A restaurant opened on the former site of a Firestone Auto Care center at the southwest corner of the parking lot.

In the 2020s, Toys Outlet, a discount retailer that sells toys, opened inside the former Sears. The discount store utilized the entirety of the former Sears space.

=== Closure and future redevelopment ===
In July 2025, a $150 million plan was proposed to redevelop the existing site into a warehouse complex. Construction is tentatively scheduled to begin in the fall of 2026, and operations will commence in 2028. A rezoning permit has been submitted, but the sale of the mall has not been made.

On April 14, 2026, the City of Chicago filed a motion seeking to shut down the mall due to structural deteriorations and a defective fire sprinkler system. In response to the filing, JCPenney announced on April 23 that it would close its location within the mall in 1–2 months. On the same day, Judge Leonard Murray ruled that the mall may continue to open in the interim, after the fire suppression system was fixed several days earlier. A later court hearing on May 15 concluded with a court order to close the mall by June 22. The mall permanently closed one day ahead of the deadline on June 21, 2026.

== Transportation ==
=== Canceled Orange Line extension ===
The original plan for the Orange Line was for the terminus to be at Ford City, but due to no federal funding, the city decided to end the line at Midway Airport, with a layout allowing for future expansion. In 2008, the Chicago Transit Authority undertook an Alternatives Analysis for the Orange Line extension to Ford City and determined that the cost of the project stood at an estimated $200 million. On August 12, 2009, the CTA approved the extension plans, but they were later canceled.

=== Bus routes ===
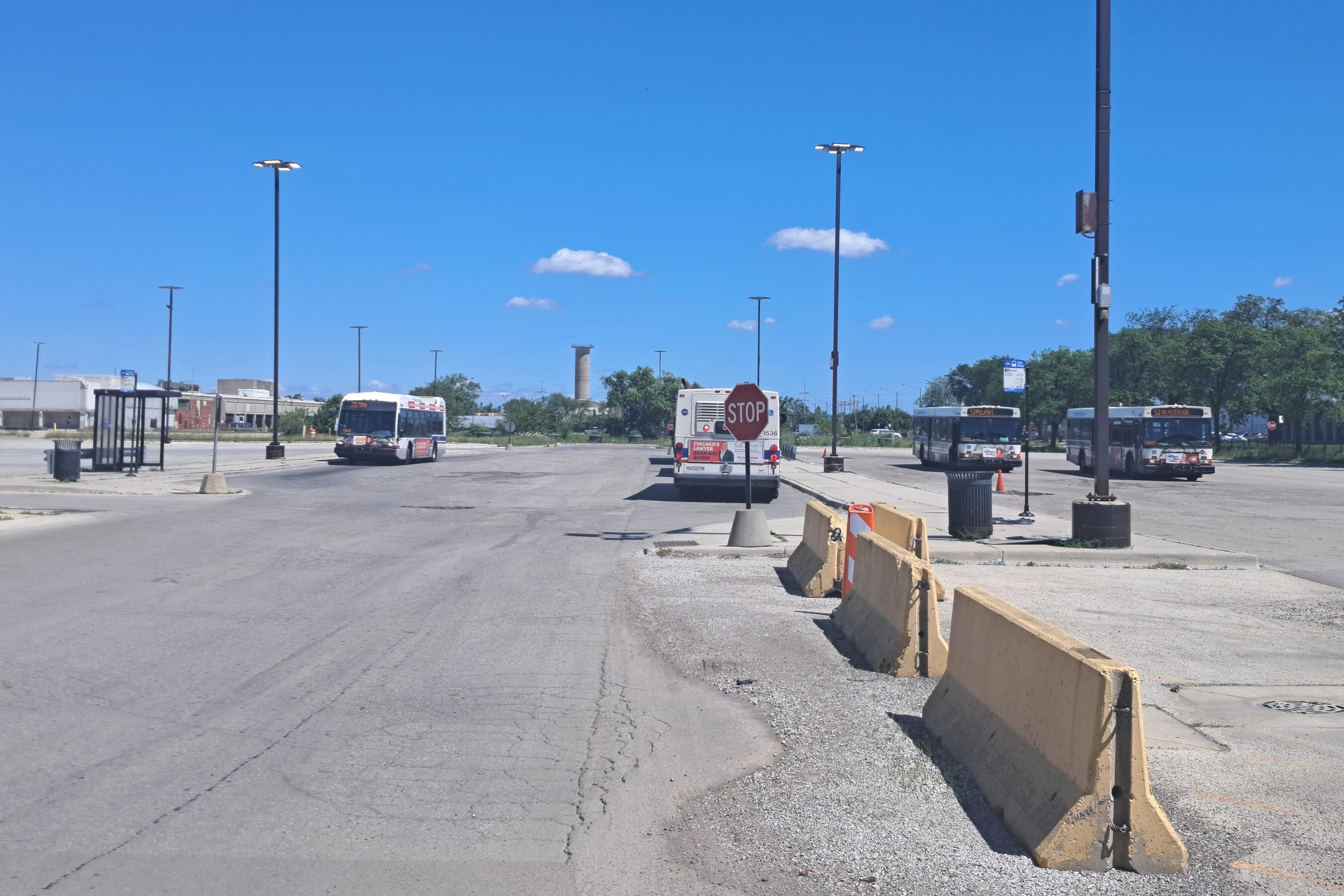
Bus stop at Ford City Mall

CTA

- 53 Pulaski
- 54B South Cicero
- 67 67th/69th/71st
- 79 79th

Pace

- 379 Midway/Orland Park
- 383 South Cicero
- 384 Narragansett/Ridgeland
- 385 87th/111th/127th
- 390 Midway CTA/UPS Hodgkins
