= 1978 Keith Prowse International =

- Date: 12–16 June
- Edition: 8th
- Category: Colgate Series (A)
- Draw: 32S / 16D
- Prize money: $35,000
- Surface: Grass
- Location: Chichester, England
- Venue: Oaklands Park

Champions

Singles
- (Australia) Evonne Goolagong Cawley

Doubles
- (United States) Pam Shriver / (United States) Janet Wright
← 1977 ·	Chichester Tennis Tournament	· 1979 →

The 1978 Keith Prowse International, also known as the Chichester International, was a women's tennis tournament played on outdoor grass courts at Oaklands Park in Chichester in England. The event was part of the A (Note: Tournaments with prize money for the women of at least $35,000.) category of the 1978 Colgate Series. It was the eighth edition of the tournament and was held from 12 June through 16 June 1978. First-seeded Evonne Goolagong Cawley won the singles title and earned $6,000 first-prize money.

== Finals ==
=== Singles ===
(Australia) Evonne Goolagong Cawley defeated (United States) Pam Teeguarden 6–4, 6–4

- It was Goolagong Cawley's 6th singles title of the year and the 79th of her career.

=== Doubles ===
(United States) Pam Shriver / (United States) Janet Newberry defeated (United Kingdom) Michelle Tyler / (South Africa) Yvonne Vermaak 3–6, 6–3, 6–4

== Prize money ==
Event	W	F	SF	QF	Round of 16	Round of 32
Singles	$6,000	$3,000	$1,800	$900	$600	$325
