= 1979 Crossley Carpets Trophy =

- Date: 11–17 June
- Edition: 9th
- Category: Colgate Series (AA)
- Draw: 32S / 16D
- Prize money: $75,000
- Surface: Grass
- Location: Chichester, England
- Venue: Oaklands Park

Champions

Singles
- (Australia) Evonne Goolagong Cawley

Doubles
- (South Africa) Greer Stevens / (Australia) Wendy Turnbull
← 1978 ·	Chichester Tennis Tournament	· 1980 →

The 1979 Crossley Carpets Trophy, also known as the Chichester International, was a women's tennis tournament played on outdoor grass courts at Oaklands Park in Chichester in England. The event was part of the AA (Note: Tournaments with prize money for the women of at least $75,000.) category of the 1979 Colgate Series. It was the ninth edition of the tournament and was held from 11 June through 17 June 1979. Fifth-seeded Evonne Goolagong Cawley won her second consecutive singles title at the event and earned $14,000 first-prize money.

== Finals ==
=== Singles ===
(Australia) Evonne Goolagong Cawley defeated (United Kingdom) Sue Barker 6–1, 6–4

- It was Goolagong Cawley's 2nd singles title of the year and the 81st of her career.

=== Doubles ===
(South Africa) Greer Stevens / (Australia) Wendy Turnbull defeated (United States) Billie Jean King / (United States) Martina Navratilova 6–3, 1–6, 7–5

== Prize money ==
Event	W	F	SF	QF	Round of 16	Round of 32
Singles	$14,000	$7,000	$3,400	$1,800	$900	$450
