= Harry Chaddick =

American businessman (1902–1994)

- Born: Harry Francis Chaddick; August 27, 1902; Chicago, IL, U.S.
- Died: May 30, 1994 (aged 91); Deerfield, Illinois
- Resting place: Evanston, Illinois
- Occupations: Philanthropist, transportation specialist, zoning director, real estate developer
- Spouse: Elaine Chaddick (m. 1955)
- Children: Camille Hatzenbuehler

Harry Francis Chaddick (August 27, 1902 – May 30, 1994) was a multimillionaire philanthropist, real estate developer, and former Director of Zoning of Chicago, Illinois. Chaddick was born and grew up in the West Side of Chicago, Illinois.

== Career ==
Chaddick started his career as a stock boy, then worked as an assistant pharmacist in a Chicago drug store.

=== Shipping ===
In 1924, at age 22, he bought a used Ford truck for $350 and entered the shipping business. He built and expanded his business, using innovative methods such as "piggyback" transportation, integrating rail shipping and truck shipping. Also, he was the first to use two-way radios in his trucks. Throughout the 1930s and 40s, Chaddick built his business into one of America's largest motor freight companies. He served on national trucking and transportation associations, and negotiated with regional and local unions, including the Teamsters Union; Chaddick negotiated with Jimmy Hoffa, who was representing Local 299 in Detroit. Chaddick also established a comprehensive truck terminal system on the West Side of Chicago. In 1954, Chaddick sold his trucking companies, and by 1957, he had mostly divested from all shipping businesses.

During World War II, because of his expertise in shipping, Chaddick received an appointment to oversee the transportation of men and materials to North Africa.

=== Zoning ===
Chaddick's work in zoning began in Chicago in the late 1940s and early 1950s. In 1948, Mayor Martin H. Kennelly tasked Chaddick to settle disagreements and draw up a new ordinance for where to place truck terminals in the city. After this engagement went favorably, Chaddick was appointed to positions in charge of zoning. Chaddick was Chicago's Director of Zoning under Mayor Kennelly and Mayor Richard Daley. In this position, Chaddick produced the city's first Comprehensive Zoning Ordinance in 1957. This was seen as a major step toward modernization, and it encouraged retail and high-rise development. Over the following decade, Chaddick and fellow city zoning officials refined and revised the laws.

=== Real estate development ===
Chaddick directed real estate development through his corporation First American Realty, in Chicago and in Palm Springs, California. As the head of First American Realty, he orchestrated the transformation of vacant real estate, an old World War II aircraft engine plant into Ford City Mall. He also developed the Brickyard shopping center, Forest Park Mall, and Addison Mall. In Palm Springs, California, Tennis Club Hotel of Palm Springs, the Palm Springs Country Club and the residential neighborhood Andreas Hills.

In 1987, Lexington Development Corp. of Arlington Heights bought First American Realty, the affiliated Harry F. Chaddick Realty, and the industrial, residential, and retail properties from Chaddick. Chaddick maintained the consultant firm of Harry F. Chaddick Associates, but this 1987 sale was seen as Chaddick's move toward retirement.

In 1988, Chaddick was inducted into the Chicago Board of Realtors Hall of Fame.

== Later life ==
Chaddick met his wife, Elaine, in a Chicago nightclub, and they married in 1955. Elaine played a crucial part in Chaddick's success in business, entertaining and planning events that brought together Chicago's business and political elites. The couple's high-profile friends included Mayor Richard Daley and Jay McMullen, husband of Mayor Jane Byrne.

=== Elaine Chaddick's kidnapping ===
As Chaddick's success spread to his developments in Palm Springs, Elaine began to spend more time there. On May 8, 1979, Elaine was kidnapped from the Chaddicks' Palm Springs home, and held for $1 million ransom. She was held in the desert, east of Joshua Tree National Park, for three days. During the ransom exchange, Elaine heard gunshots – shots exchanged between a kidnapper on a motorcycle and police in a helicopter, during a 10-mile chase. She walked through the desert until she came to a car, where her husband waited with the Federal Bureau of Investigation. These events inspired the 2008 book Night of the Full Moon, by Herb Clough, the former FBI agent in charge of Chaddick's kidnapping case. A feature film, Do It Or Die, based on that book, premiered at the Palm Springs International Film Festival in January 2017.

=== Philanthropy ===
The Chaddicks began to focus on philanthropy in the 1980s and 1990s. They established the Harry F. Chaddick and Elaine Chaddick Foundation in 1986, to fund medical, scientific, educational, and religious organizations. The Chaddicks' endowments fund the Chaddick Institute of Urban Development at DePaul University. Harry Chaddick also contributed to the establishment of The Salvation Army's social service center on Chicago's South Side.

Harry Chaddick wrote and published Chaddick! Success Against the Odds: The Autobiography of Harry F. Chaddick in 1990.

In 1996, DePaul University Special Collections and Archives obtained The Harry F. Chaddick Papers, including documents related to Chaddick's work in zoning and retail shopping development in Chicago, as well as other papers, photographs, and biographical information about Chaddick.

Chaddick died in hospice care at Whitehall of Deerfield on May 30, 1994, aged 91.
