= Patricia Edwards =

Australian tennis player

- Country (sports): Australia

Singles

Grand Slam singles results
- Australian Open: 2R (1968, 1971)
- Wimbledon: 1R (1970)

Doubles

Grand Slam doubles results
- Australian Open: 2R (1968)
- Wimbledon: 3R (1970)

Patricia A. Edwards is a retired Australian tennis player. She won the girls' double title in the Australian Championship (now the Australian Open) twice, in 1969 and 1971.

== Biography ==
Edwards' father, tennis coach Vic Edwards, was also Evonne Goolagong's coach. Edwards and Goolagong trained together and were doubles partners in international competitions in 1970 and 1971, including at Wimbledon in 1970.

In 1973 Edwards married Errol Hill at St Mary's Cathedral, Sydney.
