= Chichester International =

Women's tennis tournament in England

Defunct tennis tournament
- Event name: Chichester International (1970–71); Rothmans Championships (1972–75); Rose's Lime Juice International (1976); Chichester International (1977–78); Crossley Carpets Trophy (1979–80)
- Tour: WTA Tour (1978–80)
- Founded: 1970
- Abolished: 1980
- Editions: 11
- Location: Chichester, England
- Surface: Grass / outdoor

The Chichester International (Chichester, England) was a women's professional tennis tournament and part of the WTA Tour. The tournament was first held in 1970, and the final edition was held in 1980. It was held in the beginning of June and played on outdoor grass courts as a preparation to the Wimbledon Championships.

Evonne Goolagong Cawley won the tournament twice, in 1978 and 1979, and was the only multiple winner in the singles event.

== Event names ==
Official

- 1970–1980: Chichester International

Sponsored

- 1972–1975: Rothmans Championships
- 1976: Rose's Lime Juice International
- 1978: Keith Prowse International
- 1979–1980: Crossley Carpets Trophy

== Finals ==
=== Singles ===
Year	Champion	Runner-up	Score
1970	(United Kingdom) Ann Haydon-Jones	(United Kingdom) Joyce Barclay-Williams	6–4, 6–4
1971	(Australia) Judy Dalton	(United States) Janet Newberry	6–1, 6–4
1972	(Australia) Karen Krantzcke (Netherlands) Betty Stöve	shared title and prize (no final due to rain)	
1973	(Australia) Dianne Fromholtz	(South Africa) Brigitte Cuypers	6–1, 6–0
1974	(Israel) Paulina Peisachov	(United Kingdom) Sue Barker	6–2, 6–2
1975	(South Africa) Greer Stevens	(United States) Terry Holladay	6–7, 6–4, 6–3
1976	(South Africa) Marise Kruger	(United States) Bunny Bruning	6–2, 6–2
1977	Due to rain the tournament was cancelled after the third round.		
1978	(Australia) Evonne Goolagong Cawley	(United States) Pam Teeguarden	6–4, 6–4
1979	(Australia) Evonne Goolagong Cawley	(United Kingdom) Sue Barker	6–1, 6–4
1980	(United States) Chris Evert-Lloyd	(Australia) Evonne Goolagong Cawley	6–3, 6–7^{(4–7)}, 7–5

=== Doubles ===
Year	Champion	Runners-up	Score
1973	(United States) Julie Heldman (United States) Ann Kiyomura	(United Kingdom) Jackie Fayter (United States) Peggy Michel	7–5, 6–3
1974	(United States) Carrie Meyer (South Africa) Rowena Whitehouse	(Australia) Chris O'Neil (Australia) Jenny Walker	6–1, 6–3
1975	(Australia) Judy Dalton (Australia) Karen Krantzcke	(United States) Patti Hogan (South Africa) Greer Stevens	4–6, 6–1, 6–4
1976	(South Africa) Marise Kruger (South Africa) Elizabeth Vlotman	(United Kingdom) Corinne Molesworth (Japan) Naoko Satō	6–2, 6–1
1977	Due to rain the tournament was cancelled after the third round.		
1978	(United States) Janet Newberry (United States) Pam Shriver	(United Kingdom) Michelle Tyler (South Africa) Yvonne Vermaak	3–6, 6–3, 6–4
1979	(South Africa) Greer Stevens (Australia) Wendy Turnbull	(United States) Billie Jean King (Czechoslovakia) Martina Navratilova	6–3, 1–6, 7–5
1980	(United States) Pam Shriver (Netherlands) Betty Stöve	(United States) Rosie Casals (Australia) Wendy Turnbull	6–4, 7–5
