= 1971 Wimbledon Championships – Men's singles qualifying =

Men's singles qualifying
- 1971 Wimbledon Championships

Events
Singles	men	women		boys	girls
Doubles	men	women	mixed	boys	girls
WC Singles	men	women	quad
WC Doubles	men	women	quad
Legends	men	women	seniors

Qualification
Singles	men	women
Doubles	men	women	mixed
- Wimbledon Championships

Players who neither had high enough rankings nor received wild cards to enter the main draw of the annual Wimbledon Tennis Championships participated in a qualifying tournament held one week before the event. One player withdrew from the main draw after qualifying had commenced, leading to the highest ranked player who lost in the final qualifying round, Bob Howe, to be entered into the main draw as a lucky loser.

== Qualifiers ==
1. (West Germany) Karl Meiler
2. (West Germany) Hans-Joachim Plötz
3. (Czechoslovakia) Jiří Hřebec
4. (United Kingdom) John Feaver
5. (France) Wanaro N'Godrella
6. (United States) Butch Seewagen
7. (Australia) Peter Doerner
8. (New Zealand) Jeff Simpson
9. (South Africa) Pat Cramer
10. (Italy) Ezio Di Matteo
11. (India) Anand Amritraj
12. (United Kingdom) John de Mendoza

== Lucky losers ==
1. (Australia) Bob Howe

== Qualifying draw ==
Key

- Q = Qualifier
- WC = Wild card
- LL = Lucky loser
- Alt = Alternate
- ITF = ITF entry
- PR = Protected ranking
- SR = Special ranking
- SE = Special exempt
- JE = Junior exempt
- JR = Junior Accelerator Programme entrant
- CO = College Accelerator Programme entrant
- NG = Next Gen Accelerator Program entrant
- w/o = Walkover
- r = Retired
- d = Defaulted

=== First qualifier ===
First round
1	(United Kingdom) Chris Bovett	6	6	6
8	(France) Jean-Paul Meyer	0	1	3
4	(Ecuador) Eduardo Zuleta	6	6	8
5	(United Kingdom) Stuart Creed	3	0	6
2	(South Africa) William Freer	9	6	6
7	(Italy) Massimo Di Domenico	8	3	2
3	(West Germany) Karl Meiler	5	6	6	6
6	(Australia) Richard Howes	7	4	3	3

Second round
(United Kingdom) Chris Bovett	6	6	8
(Ecuador) Eduardo Zuleta	1	2	6
(South Africa) William Freer	3	4	4
(West Germany) Karl Meiler	6	6	6

Qualifying competition
(United Kingdom) Chris Bovett	3	1	4
(West Germany) Karl Meiler	6	6	6

=== Second qualifier ===
First round
1	(West Germany) Hans-Joachim Plötz	4	4	7	6	6
8	(Pakistan) Munawar Iqbal	6	6	5	3	4
4	(Italy) Franco Bartoni	6	6	6
5	(United Kingdom) Graeme Notman	1	1	2
2	(Australia) Alvin Gardiner	5	6	6	9
7	(United Kingdom) John Lloyd	7	3	4	7
3	(Australia) Andrew Rae	2	6	4	6	6
6	(Indonesia) Gondo Widjojo	6	3	6	4	4

Second round
(West Germany) Hans-Joachim Plötz	6	6	6
(Italy) Franco Bartoni	2	4	3
(Australia) Alvin Gardiner	6	6	6
(Australia) Andrew Rae	4	3	4

Qualifying competition
(West Germany) Hans-Joachim Plötz	8	6	6	6
(Australia) Alvin Gardiner	9	3	4	4

=== Third qualifier ===
First round
1	(South Africa) Abe Segal	6	6	6
8	(United Kingdom) Robin Drysdale	3	4	4
4	(Czechoslovakia) Jiří Hřebec	7	8	2	9
5	(United States) Tom Brown	5	6	6	7
2	(Australia) Adi Kourim	6	4	6	6
7	(United Kingdom) Ross Walker	4	6	2	4
3	(Australia) Geoffrey Twist	8	6	7	6	6
6	(France) Pierre Joly	9	4	9	3	2

Second round
(South Africa) Abe Segal	3	2	5
(Czechoslovakia) Jiří Hřebec	6	6	7
(Australia) Adi Kourim	7	2	2
(Australia) Geoffrey Twist	9	6	6

Qualifying competition
(Czechoslovakia) Jiří Hřebec	6	6	6
(Australia) Geoffrey Twist	4	1	0

=== Fourth qualifier ===
First round
1	(United Kingdom) John Feaver	1	6	6	9
8	(Pakistan) Saeed Meer	6	4	3	8
4	(United Kingdom) Mike Collins	6	6	6
5	(United States) Mark Elliott	0	2	1
2	(Socialist Federal Republic of Yugoslavia) Zlatko Ivančić	6	6	3	6
7	(Australia) William Durham	1	2	6	3
3	(Australia) Jim Moore	6	6	6
6	(Australia) Alan Haswell	3	4	4

Second round
(United Kingdom) John Feaver	6	7	5	6
(United Kingdom) Mike Collins	4	5	7	3
(Socialist Federal Republic of Yugoslavia) Zlatko Ivančić	6	6	4	6
(Australia) Jim Moore	3	3	6	1

Qualifying competition
(United Kingdom) John Feaver	3	6	6	7
(Socialist Federal Republic of Yugoslavia) Zlatko Ivančić	6	3	3	5

=== Fifth qualifier ===
First round
1	(United Kingdom) Paul Hutchins	5	6	6	6
8	(Italy) Vincenzo Franchitti	7	2	4	2
4	(France) Wanaro N'Godrella	6	6	6
5	(Australia) Paul Kronk	2	3	4
2	(Australia) Graeme Thomson	6	6	7
7	(Denmark) Tom Christensen	3	3	5
3	(Australia) Greg Perkins	5	6	6	6
6	(United Kingdom) Simon Partridge	7	4	4	0

Second round
(United Kingdom) Paul Hutchins	3	8	6	4
(France) Wanaro N'Godrella	6	9	0	6
(Australia) Graeme Thomson	6	2	3	3
(Australia) Greg Perkins	3	6	6	6

Qualifying competition
(France) Wanaro N'Godrella	6	6	3	6
(Australia) Greg Perkins	4	2	6	4

=== Sixth qualifier ===
First round
1	(Chile) Jaime Rene Pinto Bravo	6	6	6	6
8	(Australia) Anthony Hammond	3	8	1	1
4	(Australia) Bob Rheinberger	6	4	3	6	6
5	(Japan) Junzo Kawamori	3	6	6	3	4
2	(France) Thierry Bernasconi	4	2	6	6	6
7	(United Kingdom) Lindsay Murphy	6	6	2	3	3
3	(United States) Butch Seewagen	6	6	1	6
6	(Australia) John James	4	3	6	4

Second round
(Chile) Jaime Rene Pinto Bravo	7	6	6
(Australia) Bob Rheinberger	5	3	4
(France) Thierry Bernasconi	4	7	6	1	2
(United States) Butch Seewagen	6	5	3	6	6

Qualifying competition
(Chile) Jaime Rene Pinto Bravo	3	6	6	6	6
(United States) Butch Seewagen	6	8	1	3	8

=== Seventh qualifier ===
First round
1	(Australia) Peter Doerner	5	9	3	8	7
8	(Netherlands) Jan Hordijk	7	8	6	6	5
4	(United Kingdom) Ken Weatherley	5	7	7	9	6
5	(Australia) William Lloyd	7	5	9	8	1
2	(Jamaica) Richard Russell	9	6	2	4	9
7	(New Zealand) Ian Beverley	7	4	6	6	7
3	(Italy) Corrado Barazzutti	6	6	6
6	(Indonesia) Atet Wijono	4	2	3

Second round
(Australia) Peter Doerner	6	4	6	2	8
(United Kingdom) Ken Weatherley	2	6	2	6	6
(Jamaica) Richard Russell	6	6	6
(Italy) Corrado Barazzutti	1	2	4

Qualifying competition
(Australia) Peter Doerner	6	5	6	6
(Jamaica) Richard Russell	4	7	2	4

=== Eighth qualifier ===
First round
1	(New Zealand) Jeff Simpson	3	6	6	1	6
8	(United Kingdom) Keith Wooldridge	6	4	2	6	1
4	(Spain) José Guerrero	3	6	6	6
5	(India) Gaurav Misra	6	3	2	3
2	(Japan) Koji Watanabe	3	6	6	4	12
7	(Brazil) Joaquim Rasgado	6	1	4	6	10
3	(United Kingdom) Mark Farrell	6	6	6
6	(Italy) Piero Toci	1	2	1

Second round
(New Zealand) Jeff Simpson	7	4	7	8	6
(Spain) José Guerrero	5	6	5	9	2
(Japan) Koji Watanabe	5	6	3	7	3
(United Kingdom) Mark Farrell	7	3	6	5	6

Qualifying competition
(New Zealand) Jeff Simpson	8	8	6
(United Kingdom) Mark Farrell	6	6	4

=== Ninth qualifier ===
First round
1	(United States) William Higgins	6	6	6
8	(Netherlands) Fred Hemmes	1	2	4
4	(Australia) Bob Howe	4	9	6	7
5	(Pakistan) Mohammed Arif Ilahi	6	7	4	5
2	(United Kingdom) Colin McHugo	2	1	6	6	6
7	(United States) Robert Stock	6	6	3	4	4
3	(South Africa) Pat Cramer	3	6	6	9
6	(West Germany) Frank Falderbaum	6	1	4	7

Second round
(United States) William Higgins	2	3	4
(Australia) Bob Howe	6	6	6
(United Kingdom) Colin McHugo	1	4	4
(South Africa) Pat Cramer	6	6	6

Qualifying competition
(Australia) Bob Howe	6	1	6	4
(South Africa) Pat Cramer	3	6	8	6

=== Tenth qualifier ===
First round
1	(Italy) Ezio Di Matteo	6	6	6
8	(India) Vijay Amritraj	4	3	2
4	(United Kingdom) Stephen Warboys	6	6	3	7
5	(Japan) Jun Kamiwazumi	2	4	6	5
2	(Australia) Rod Frawley	6	6	6
7	(Brazil) Luis C Moreira	2	2	4
3	(New Zealand) Anthony Parun	6	6	4	6
6	(Zimbabwe) Sheridan Towers	4	1	6	3

Second round
(Italy) Ezio Di Matteo	3	7	6	3	6
(United Kingdom) Stephen Warboys	6	5	3	6	3
(Australia) Rod Frawley	2	5	5
(New Zealand) Anthony Parun	6	7	7

Qualifying competition
(Italy) Ezio Di Matteo	6	6	6
(New Zealand) Anthony Parun	4	3	3

=== Eleventh qualifier ===
First round
1	(Australia) Cliff Letcher	7	9	3	6
8	(South Africa) Frank Briscoe	5	7	6	4
4	(India) Anand Amritraj	6	6	6
5	(France) Jacques Thamin	3	0	2
2	(Japan) Kenichi Hirai	4	6	4	6	6
7	(United States) Larry Collins	6	2	6	4	1
3	(Australia) John Manderson	6	6	6
6	(United Kingdom) Geoffrey Bluett	3	4	4

Second round
(Australia) Cliff Letcher	6	2	3	6	4
(India) Anand Amritraj	3	6	6	2	6
(Japan) Kenichi Hirai	6	6	8	6
(Australia) John Manderson	4	4	9	3

Qualifying competition
(India) Anand Amritraj	6	6	6
(Japan) Kenichi Hirai	2	4	2

=== Twelfth qualifier ===
First round
1	(United Kingdom) John de Mendoza	6	6	6
8	(France) Patrice Dominguez	2	0	2
4	(Italy) Antonio Zugarelli	6	8	6
5	(Japan) Takeshi Koura	4	6	4
2	(Zimbabwe) Desmond McKenzie	3	6	6	8
7	(Soviet Union) Aleksandr Bogomolov	6	4	2	6
3	(United States) Robert Kreiss	2	6	6	7
6	(India) Jayakumar Royappa	6	4	3	5

Second round
(United Kingdom) John de Mendoza	6	6	6
(Italy) Antonio Zugarelli	4	1	4
(Zimbabwe) Desmond McKenzie	7	4	4	3
(United States) Robert Kreiss	5	6	6	6

Qualifying competition
(United Kingdom) John de Mendoza	6	6	8
(United States) Robert Kreiss	4	3	6
