= Rothmans Connaught Hard Court Championships =

Connaught Hard Court Championships

Defunct tennis tournament
- Tour: ILTF
- Founded: 1951; 75 years ago
- Abolished: 1974; 52 years ago
- Location: Chingford, Essex, England.
- Venue: Connaught Lawn Tennis Club (f.1885)
- Surface: Clay- outdoors

The Rothmans Connaught Hard Court Championships also known simply as the Connaught Hard Courts was a combined men's and women's clay court tennis tournament founded in 1951. The championships were organised by the Connaught Lawn Tennis Club, Chingford, Essex, England. The tournament ran until 1974.

== History ==
The Connaught Hard Court Championships, were established in 1951 as an open tournament held at the Connaught Lawn Tennis Club (f.1885), Chingford, Essex, England. The tournament was continually staged until 1974. The tournament was sponsored by the tobacco company Rothmans International from 1971 to 1974.

Notable winners of the men's singles title included; Tony Mottram, Jack Arkinstall, Torben Ulrich, Sven Davidson, Lew Hoad, Rod Laver, Jaroslav Drobný, and Owen Davidson. Previous winners of women's singles title included; Doris Hart, Angela Mortimer, Christine Truman, Norma Baylon, Ann Haydon Jones, Virginia Wade, and Dianne Fromholtz.

== Finals ==
=== Men's singles ===
(Incomplete roll)

Year	Champions	Runners-up	Score
↓ ILTF Circuit ↓
1951	(United Kingdom) Tony Mottram	(United Kingdom) John Horn	6-0, 6-3
1952	(United Kingdom) Tony Mottram (2)	(Poland) Ignacy Tloczynski	2-6, 6-1, 6-3
1953	(Australia) Jack Arkinstall	(Rhodesia) Don Black	6-3, 6-0
1954	(Denmark) Torben Ulrich	(United Kingdom) Bobby Wilson	6-2, 1-6, 6-0
1955	(Sweden) Sven Davidson	(United Kingdom) Mike Davies	6-4, 6-1
1956	(Australia) Lew Hoad	(United Kingdom) Bobby Wilson	6-2, 6-1
1957	(Egypt) Jaroslav Drobný	(United Kingdom) Mike Davies	6-4, 6-3
1958	(United Kingdom) Roger Becker	(United Kingdom) Mike Davies	4-6, 6-4, 6-3
1959	(United Kingdom) Roger Becker (2)	(United Kingdom) Bobby Wilson	7-5, 2-6, 6-4
1960	(United Kingdom) Bobby Wilson	(United Kingdom) Roger Becker	6-4, 6-4
1961	(United Kingdom) Bobby Wilson (2)	(United Kingdom) Alan Mills	8-6, 6-1
1962	(Australia) Rod Laver	(Australia) Martin Mulligan	4-6, 6-4, 6-4
1963	(United Kingdom) Bobby Wilson (3)	(United Kingdom) Mike Sangster	8-6, 6-4, 6-2
1964	(United Kingdom) Bobby Wilson (4)	(United Kingdom) Mike Sangster	6-2, 6-3
1965	(United Kingdom) Bobby Wilson (5)	(United Kingdom) Mark Cox	6-2, 8-6
1966	(United Kingdom) Bobby Wilson (6)	(United Kingdom) Alan Mills	6-2, 6-2
1967	(Sweden) Birger Folke	(Sweden) Lars Ölander	6-3, 2-6, 14-12
1968	(United Kingdom) Paul Hutchins	(United Kingdom) Bobby Wilson	6-2, 1-6, 6-1
↓ Open era ↓
1969	(Australia) Allan Stone	(Australia) John Cooper	6-4, 6-2
1972	(Rhodesia) Hank Irvine	(United Kingdom) John Clifton	6-2, 6-2
1973	(Australia) Owen Davidson	(United Kingdom) Colin Dowdeswell	3-6, 9-8, 6-1

=== Women's singles ===
(Incomplete roll)

Year	Champions	Runners-up	Score
↓ ILTF Circuit ↓
1951	(United Kingdom) Kay Tuckey	(United Kingdom) Joy Gannon Mottram	6-4, 6-4
1952	(United Kingdom) Jean Walker-Smith	(United Kingdom) Joy Gannon Mottram	1-6, 9-7, 6-4
1953	(United States) Doris Hart	(United States) Shirley Fry	6-3, 4-6, 6-4
1954	(United Kingdom) Leonie Thorn Brighton	(United Kingdom) Jenny Middleton	7-5, 6-3
1955	(United Kingdom) Angela Mortimer	(United Kingdom) Elaine Watson	6-1, 6-0
1956	(United Kingdom) Angela Mortimer (2)	(United Kingdom) Jenny Middleton	6-3, 6-1
1957	(United Kingdom) Christine Truman	(United Kingdom) Elaine Shenton	6-3, 6-3
1958	(United Kingdom) Christine Truman (2)	(United Kingdom) Ann Haydon	6-3, 8-6
1959	(United Kingdom) Angela Mortimer (3)	(United Kingdom) Christine Truman	6-3, 7-5
1960	(United Kingdom) Angela Mortimer (4)	(United Kingdom) Christine Truman	6-1, 4-6, 6-4
1961	(United Kingdom) Angela Mortimer (5)	(West Germany) Edda Buding	6-3, 6-3
1962	(United Kingdom) Angela Mortimer (6)	(United Kingdom) Christine Truman	6-2, 6-4
1963	(Argentina) Norma Baylon	(United Kingdom) Christine Truman	divide title
1964	(Argentina) Norma Baylon (2)	(United Kingdom) Christine Truman	3-6, 6-2, 6-4
1965	(United Kingdom) Elizabeth Starkie	(United Kingdom) Christine Truman	8-6, 6-3
1966	(United Kingdom) Ann Haydon Jones	(United Kingdom) Virginia Wade	6-4, 6-3
1967	(United Kingdom) Virginia Wade	(Rhodesia) Pat Walkden	6-0, 9-7
1968	(Australia) Faye Toyne Moore	(United Kingdom) Virginia Wade	6-4, 8-6
↓ Open era ↓
1969	(United Kingdom) Corinne Molesworth	(United Kingdom) Shirley Bloomer Brasher	3-6, 6-2, 6-4
1972	(Australia) Cynthia Sieler	(United States) Wendy Appleby	7-5, 7-5
1973	(Australia) Dianne Fromholtz	(South Africa) Ilana Kloss	6-1, 3-6, 6-4

== Tournament records ==
- Most men's singles titles: (United Kingdom) Bobby Wilson (6)
- Most men's singles finals: (United Kingdom) Bobby Wilson (8)
- Most women's singles titles: (United Kingdom) Angela Mortimer (6)
- Most women's singles finals: (United Kingdom) Christine Truman (8)
