= Barbara Downs =

American tennis player

- Country (sports): United States
- Born: March 4, 1954 (age 71); Berkeley, California
- Plays: Right-handed

Singles

Grand Slam singles results
- French Open: 1R (1972, 1973)
- Wimbledon: 1R (1973, 1974, 1975)
- US Open: 3R (1972)

Doubles

Grand Slam doubles results
- French Open: 1R (1973)
- US Open: 2R (1972)

Barbara Downs (born March 4, 1954) is an American former professional tennis player.

Downs grew up in Alamo, California and competed on the professional tour in the 1970s. She made the round of 16 at the 1972 US Open (beaten by Virginia Wade) and also made main draw appearances at Wimbledon. In 1973 she was picked for the season-ending Virginia Slims Championships. She took part in the inaugural World TeamTennis season in 1974, playing for the Chicago Aces and San Francisco Golden Gaters.
