= 1972 US Open – Men's doubles =

Men's doubles
- 1972 US Open

Final
- Champions: (South Africa) Cliff Drysdale (United Kingdom) Roger Taylor
- Runners-up: (Australia) Owen Davidson (Australia) John Newcombe
- Score: 6–4, 7–6, 6–3

Details
- Draw: 64
- Seeds: 8

Events
Singles	men	women		boys	girls
Doubles	men	women	mixed	boys	girls
WC Singles	men	women	quad
WC Doubles	men	women	quad
Legends	men	women	mixed
← 1971 ·	US Open	· 1973 →

John Newcombe and Roger Taylor were the defending US Open men's doubles champions, but did not defend their title as a team.

Sixth-seeded Cliff Drysdale and Roger Taylor won the title by defeating unseeded Owen Davidson and John Newcombe 6–4, 7–6, 6–3 in the final.

== Seeds ==
1. (Netherlands) Tom Okker / (United States) Marty Riessen (third round)
2. (South Africa) Bob Hewitt / (South Africa) Frew McMillan (first round)
3. (Australia) Roy Emerson / (Australia) Rod Laver (third round, withdrew)
4. (United States) Arthur Ashe / (United States) Bob Lutz (first round)
5. (United States) Stan Smith / (United States) Erik van Dillen (semifinals)
6. (South Africa) Cliff Drysdale / (United Kingdom) Roger Taylor (champions)
7. (Romania) Ilie Năstase / (Spain) Manuel Orantes (semifinals)
8. (Australia) Ken Rosewall / (Australia) Fred Stolle (third round)

== Draw ==
=== Key ===
- Q = Qualifier
- WC = Wild card
- LL = Lucky loser
- Alt = Alternate
- ITF = ITF entry
- PR = Protected ranking
- SR = Special ranking
- SE = Special exempt
- JE = Junior exempt
- JR = Junior Accelerator Programme entrant
- CO = College Accelerator Programme entrant
- NG = Next Gen Accelerator Program entrant
- w/o = Walkover
- r = Retired
- d = Defaulted

=== Finals ===
Quarterfinals
(United States) Clark Graebner (Australia) Mal Anderson	7	6	1	5
5	(United States) Stan Smith (United States) Erik van Dillen	6	7	6	7
(Australia) Owen Davidson (Australia) John Newcombe	3	6	6	3	6
(Australia) John Alexander (Australia) Phil Dent	6	4	4	6	1
6	(South Africa) Cliff Drysdale (United Kingdom) Roger Taylor	6	6	7
(Spain) Andrés Gimeno (Spain) Antonio Munoz	3	4	6
7	(Romania) Ilie Năstase (Spain) Manuel Orantes	7	6	6	7
(United States) Robert McKinley (United States) Dick Stockton	5	7	3	6

Semifinals
5	(United States) Stan Smith (United States) Erik van Dillen	3	2	5
(Australia) Owen Davidson (Australia) John Newcombe	6	6	7
6	(South Africa) Cliff Drysdale (United Kingdom) Roger Taylor	6	6	6
7	(Romania) Ilie Năstase (Spain) Manuel Orantes	4	4	2

Final
(Australia) Owen Davidson (Australia) John Newcombe	4	6	3
6	(South Africa) Cliff Drysdale (United Kingdom) Roger Taylor	6	7	6

=== Top half ===
==== Section 1 ====
First round
1	(Netherlands) T Okker (United States) M Riessen	6	6	6
(France) P Dominguez (France) P Proisy	3	4	1
(Sweden) O Bengtson (Sweden) B Borg	6	4	5
(United Kingdom) J Paish (Rhodesia) A Pattison	7	6	7
(United States) J McManus (United States) J Osborne	6	5	3
(United States) H Fitzgibbon (Mexico) T Palafox	7	7	6
(Australia) M Anderson (United States) C Graebner	6	6	6
(United States) J Borowiak (Pakistan) H Rahim	3	4	4
5	(United States) S Smith (United States) E van Dillen	6	7	6
(Australia) I Fletcher (Australia) B Phillips-Moore	3	6	3
(United States) P Gerken (United States) B Gottfried	6	6	6	6
(United Kingdom) G Battrick (United States) C Richey	4	7	3	4
(United States) E Dibbs (United States) D Ralston	6	6	5	7	6
(Venezuela) H Hose (Chile) JR Pinto Bravo	7	2	7	5	4
(United States) P Gonzales (Denmark) T Ulrich	2	6	7	6
(Soviet Union) T Kakulia (Soviet Union) V Korotkov	6	3	6	2

Second round
1	(Netherlands) T Okker (United States) M Riessen	7	6	7
(United Kingdom) J Paish (Rhodesia) A Pattison	6	4	6
(United States) H Fitzgibbon (Mexico) T Palafox	6	6	6	6
(Australia) M Anderson (United States) C Graebner	7	7	2	7
5	(United States) S Smith (United States) E van Dillen	6	6	6
(United States) P Gerken (United States) B Gottfried	3	3	3
(United States) E Dibbs (United States) D Ralston	4	6	6	6	7
(United States) P Gonzales (Denmark) T Ulrich	6	7	4	4	6

Third round
1	(Netherlands) T Okker (United States) M Riessen	7	1	5	5
(Australia) M Anderson (United States) C Graebner	6	6	7	7
5	(United States) S Smith (United States) E van Dillen	6	6	6
(United States) E Dibbs (United States) D Ralston	3	4	2

Quarterfinals
(Australia) M Anderson (United States) C Graebner	7	6	1	5
5	(United States) S Smith (United States) E van Dillen	6	7	6	7

==== Section 2 ====
First round
4	(United States) A Ashe (United States) B Lutz	6	4	7	3	6
(Australia) R Case (Australia) G Masters	3	6	6	6	7
(Czechoslovakia) J Kodeš (Czechoslovakia) J Kukal	6	3	4
(United States) F Froehling (United States) C Pasarell	7	6	6
(Australia) O Davidson (Australia) J Newcombe	6	6	6
(India) A Amritraj (India) V Amritraj	3	4	4
(Australia) T Addison (Australia) B Carmichael	6	6	6
(United Kingdom) S Matthews (United Kingdom) S Warboys	1	4	4
8	(Australia) K Rosewall (Australia) F Stolle	6	6	6
Alt	(United States) K McMillan (United States) P Walthall	3	2	2
(United States) S Giammalva (United States) D Savitt	6	6	4	6
(United States) V Seixas (United States) T Trabert	4	4	6	3
(United States) R Reid (South Africa) T Ryan	6	6	5	3	2
(France) J-B Chanfreau (France) G Goven	4	4	7	6	6
(United States) J Gorsuch (United States) C McKinley	5	4	5
(Australia) J Alexander (Australia) P Dent	7	6	7

Second round
(Australia) R Case (Australia) G Masters	6	6	3	6
(United States) F Froehling (United States) C Pasarell	4	3	6	3
(Australia) O Davidson (Australia) J Newcombe	2	6	6	6
(Australia) T Addison (Australia) B Carmichael	6	3	4	4
8	(Australia) K Rosewall (Australia) F Stolle	6	7	6
(United States) S Giammalva (United States) D Savitt	4	6	1
(France) J-B Chanfreau (France) G Goven	6	6	4	6
(Australia) J Alexander (Australia) P Dent	3	7	6	7

Third round
(Australia) R Case (Australia) G Masters	6	4	3	4
(Australia) O Davidson (Australia) J Newcombe	3	6	6	6
8	(Australia) K Rosewall (Australia) F Stolle	4	4	7	7	6
(Australia) J Alexander (Australia) P Dent	6	6	6	6	7

Quarterfinals
(Australia) O Davidson (Australia) J Newcombe	3	6	6	3	6
(Australia) J Alexander (Australia) P Dent	6	4	4	6	1

=== Bottom half ===
==== Section 3 ====
First round
(United States) V Gerulaitis (United States) E Scott	4	4	6	6	6
(France) W N'Godrella (France) J-L Rouyer	6	6	4	1	0
(South Africa) B Maud (India) S Menon	6	7	6	4
(Colombia) I Molina (Colombia) J Velasco	7	6	7	6
(United States) P DuPré (United States) S Krulevitz	6	7	6	6	6
(Chile) P Cornejo (Chile) J Fillol	7	6	7	4	7
(United States) D Dell (United States) B Seewagen	6	2	7	2	4
6	(South Africa) C Drysdale (United Kingdom) R Taylor	3	6	6	6	6
(Spain) A Gimeno (Spain) A Muñoz	5	6	6	6	6
(United Kingdom) M Cox (United Kingdom) G Stilwell	7	3	3	7	4
(United States) J Austin (United States) S Mayer	2	5	7	6	7
(United States) R Barth (United States) T Leonard	6	7	6	2	6
(United States) M Machette (Mexico) R Ramírez	7	7	6
(United States) S Mott (United States) B Teacher	6	6	1
(Japan) J Kuki (United States) S Turner	1	4	4
3	(Australia) R Emerson (Australia) R Laver	6	6	6

Second round
(United States) V Gerulaitis (United States) E Scott	6	6	6	6
(Colombia) I Molina (Colombia) J Velasco	3	2	7	4
(Chile) P Cornejo (Chile) J Fillol	6	3	6	3
6	(South Africa) C Drysdale (United Kingdom) R Taylor	7	6	3	6
(Spain) A Gimeno (Spain) A Muñoz	6	6	6	4	6
(United States) J Austin (United States) S Mayer	4	2	7	6	3
(United States) M Machette (Mexico) R Ramírez	7	4	6	4	3
3	(Australia) R Emerson (Australia) R Laver	6	6	4	6	6

Third round
(United States) V Gerulaitis (United States) E Scott	4	4	6
6	(South Africa) C Drysdale (United Kingdom) R Taylor	6	6	7
(Spain) A Gimeno (Spain) A Muñoz	w/o
3	(Australia) R Emerson (Australia) R Laver

Quarterfinals
6	(South Africa) C Drysdale (United Kingdom) R Taylor	6	6	7
(Spain) A Gimeno (Spain) A Muñoz	3	4	6

==== Section 4 ====
First round
(Socialist Federal Republic of Yugoslavia) N Pilić (Australia) A Stone	2	7	6	3
(Egypt) I El Shafei (New Zealand) B Fairlie	6	6	7	6
(United States) W Higgins (United States) D O'Bryant	5	7	4	6	2
(United States) M Estep (United States) C Owens	7	6	6	6	6
(Japan) J Kamiwazumi (Japan) T Sakai	6	3	4
(New Zealand) O Parun (New Zealand) J Simpson	7	6	6
(West Germany) J Fassbender (West Germany) H-J Pohmann	3	5	3
7	(Romania) I Năstase (Spain) M Orantes	6	7	6
(United States) A Olmedo (United States) R Tanner	5	3	7	7	6
(United States) R McKinley (United States) D Stockton	7	6	5	6	7
(United States) B Brown (Australia) P Doernerr	3	3	2
(South Africa) P Cramer (Rhodesia) H Irvine	6	6	6
(South Africa) R Moore (South Africa) D Schroder	3	2	4
(United States) J Connors (United States) T Gorman	6	6	6
(Australia) J Cooper (Australia) C Dibley	6	7	6
2	(South Africa) B Hewitt (South Africa) F McMillan	4	5	4

Second round
(Egypt) I El Shafei (New Zealand) B Fairlie	4	6	6	2
(United States) M Estep (United States) C Owens	6	3	7	6
(New Zealand) O Parun (New Zealand) J Simpson	7	6	3	3
7	(Romania) I Năstase (Spain) M Orantes	6	7	6	6
(United States) R McKinley (United States) D Stockton	6	6	6	6	6
(South Africa) P Cramer (Rhodesia) H Irvine	4	7	7	3	3
(United States) J Connors (United States) T Gorman	6	6	6	6
(Australia) J Cooper (Australia) C Dibley	2	4	7	2

Third round
(United States) M Estep (United States) C Owens	6	3	5	2
7	(Romania) I Năstase (Spain) M Orantes	4	6	7	6
(United States) R McKinley (United States) D Stockton	6	2	6	2	6
(United States) J Connors (United States) T Gorman	3	6	4	6	1

Quarterfinals
7	(Romania) I Năstase (Spain) M Orantes	7	6	6	7
(United States) R McKinley (United States) D Stockton	5	7	3	6
