= 1971 Wimbledon Championships – Men's doubles =

Men's doubles
- 1971 Wimbledon Championships

Final
- Champions: (Australia) Roy Emerson (Australia) Rod Laver
- Runners-up: (United States) Arthur Ashe (United States) Dennis Ralston
- Score: 4–6, 9–7, 6–8, 6–4, 6–4

Details
- Draw: 64 (4 Q )
- Seeds: 4

Events
Singles	men	women		boys	girls
Doubles	men	women	mixed	boys	girls
← 1970 ·	Wimbledon Championships	· 1972 →

John Newcombe and Tony Roche were the defending champions, but lost in the first round to Cliff Drysdale and Nikola Pilić.

Roy Emerson and Rod Laver defeated Arthur Ashe and Dennis Ralston in the final, 4–6, 9–7, 6–8, 6–4, 6–4 to win the gentlemen's doubles title at the 1971 Wimbledon Championships.

This was the first edition to be played with a 12-point tie-break, which would occur at 8-all in any set but the decider.

== Seeds ==
1. (Australia) John Newcombe / (Australia) Tony Roche (first round)
2. (Australia) Ken Rosewall / (Australia) Fred Stolle (quarterfinals)
3. (South Africa) Bob Hewitt / (South Africa) Frew McMillan (first round)
4. (Romania) Ilie Năstase / (Romania) Ion Țiriac (quarterfinals)

Click on the seed number of a player to go to their draw section.

== Draw ==
=== Key ===
- Q = Qualifier
- WC = Wild card
- LL = Lucky loser
- Alt = Alternate
- ITF = ITF entry
- PR = Protected ranking
- SR = Special ranking
- SE = Special exempt
- JE = Junior exempt
- JR = Junior Accelerator Programme entrant
- CO = College Accelerator Programme entrant
- NG = Next Gen Accelerator Program entrant
- w/o = Walkover
- r = Retired
- d = Defaulted

=== Finals ===
Quarterfinals
(Australia) Bill Bowrey (Australia) Owen Davidson	3	5	3
(Australia) Roy Emerson (Australia) Rod Laver	6	7	6
4	(Romania) Ilie Năstase (Romania) Ion Țiriac	6	3	6	7	2
(Australia) John Alexander (Australia) Phil Dent	8	6	3	5	6
(Socialist Federal Republic of Yugoslavia) Željko Franulović (South Africa) Bob Maud	8	6	4	1
(United States) Clark Graebner (Brazil) Thomaz Koch	9	4	6	6
(United States) Arthur Ashe (United States) Dennis Ralston	7	6	2	6
2	(Australia) Ken Rosewall (Australia) Fred Stolle	5	3	6	1

Semifinals
(Australia) Roy Emerson (Australia) Rod Laver	6	3	6	6
(Australia) John Alexander (Australia) Phil Dent	4	6	3	4
(United States) Clark Graebner (Brazil) Thomaz Koch	9	3	6	4
(United States) Arthur Ashe (United States) Dennis Ralston	8	6	8	6

Final
(Australia) Roy Emerson (Australia) Rod Laver	4	9	6	6	6
(United States) Arthur Ashe (United States) Dennis Ralston	6	7	8	4	4

=== Top half ===
==== Section 1 ====
First round
1	(Australia) J Newcombe (Australia) A Roche	6	7	5	3
(South Africa) C Drysdale (Socialist Federal Republic of Yugoslavia) N Pilić	2	9	7	6
(Australia) J Cooper (Australia) C Dibley	6	6	6
(Italy) M di Domenico (Italy) A Panatta	3	2	1
(United Kingdom) P Hutchins (United Kingdom) S Matthews
Q	(South Africa) P Cramer (Australia) P Doerner	w/o
(Australia) W Bowrey (Australia) O Davidson	7	4	6	6
(Czechoslovakia) J Kodeš (Czechoslovakia) J Kukal	5	6	4	1
(Australia) R Emerson (Australia) R Laver	6	6	9
(Greece) N Kalogeropoulos (Chile) J Pinto Bravo	3	3	7
(Hungary) I Gulyás (Chile) P Rodríguez	2	4	4
(France) P Barthès (France) J-B Chanfreau	6	6	6
(India) P Lall (India) J Mukerjea	6	6	8	6
Q	(Jamaica) R Russell (United Kingdom) S Warboys	3	1	9	2
Q	(Australia) J Bartlett (Australia) G Perkins	8	4	6	6	3
(Australia) R Case (Soviet Union) A Metreveli	9	6	3	4	6

Second round
(South Africa) C Drysdale (Socialist Federal Republic of Yugoslavia) N Pilić	8	6	3	6	7
(Australia) J Cooper (Australia) C Dibley	9	4	6	2	5
(United Kingdom) P Hutchins (United Kingdom) S Matthews	8	6	1
(Australia) W Bowrey (Australia) O Davidson	9	8	6
(Australia) R Emerson (Australia) R Laver	6	6	6
(France) P Barthès (France) J-B Chanfreau	4	4	3
(India) P Lall (India) J Mukerjea	9	3	4	3
(Australia) R Case (Soviet Union) A Metreveli	8	6	6	6

Third round
(South Africa) C Drysdale (Socialist Federal Republic of Yugoslavia) N Pilić	2	9	6	7	3
(Australia) W Bowrey (Australia) O Davidson	6	8	3	9	6
(Australia) R Emerson (Australia) R Laver	6	9	6
(Australia) R Case (Soviet Union) A Metreveli	3	8	3

Quarterfinals
(Australia) W Bowrey (Australia) O Davidson	3	5	3
(Australia) R Emerson (Australia) R Laver	6	7	6

==== Section 2 ====
First round
4	(Romania) I Năstase (Romania) I Țiriac	9	6	6
(United States) F Froehling (Australia) R Keldie	7	1	3
(France) G Goven (France) P Proisy	1	9	6	9
(Australia) K Fletcher (South Africa) A Segal	6	8	4	7
(Chile) P Cornejo (Chile) J Fillol	6	6	6
(United Kingdom) A Mills (United Kingdom) R Wilson	2	4	3
(Japan) K Watanabe (Japan) K Yanagi	6	3	7	8	5
(Colombia) W Álvarez (Brazil) JE Mandarino	3	6	5	9	7
(United Kingdom) J Clifton (United Kingdom) J Paish	3	7	6	1
(Rhodesia) H Irvine (Rhodesia) A Pattison	6	9	4	6
(Australia) A McDonald (Australia) K Warwick	3	4	6	6	6
(Australia) T Addison (Czechoslovakia) M Holeček	6	6	3	4	3
(France) F Jauffret (France) J-L Rouyer	8	3	4	4
(Australia) J Alexander (Australia) P Dent	6	6	6	6
(United States) T Brown (United States) E Scott	6	6	2	2
(Australia) R Carmichael (Australia) R Ruffels	8	3	6	6

Second round
4	(Romania) I Năstase (Romania) I Țiriac	6	6	6
(France) G Goven (France) P Proisy	2	3	4
(Chile) P Cornejo (Chile) J Fillol	6	6	6
(Colombia) W Álvarez (Brazil) JE Mandarino	4	0	2
(Rhodesia) H Irvine (Rhodesia) A Pattison	9	6	6
(Australia) A McDonald (Australia) K Warwick	8	4	2
(Australia) J Alexander (Australia) P Dent	6	6	8	9
(Australia) R Carmichael (Australia) R Ruffels	4	4	9	8

Third round
4	(Romania) I Năstase (Romania) I Țiriac	7	7	6
(Chile) P Cornejo (Chile) J Fillol	5	5	3
(Rhodesia) H Irvine (Rhodesia) A Pattison	4	4	4
(Australia) J Alexander (Australia) P Dent	6	6	6

Quarterfinals
4	(Romania) I Năstase (Romania) I Țiriac	6	3	6	7	2
(Australia) J Alexander (Australia) P Dent	8	6	3	5	6

=== Bottom half ===
==== Section 3 ====
First round
(Australia) R Howe (Australia) F Sedgman	6	8	6	9
(Romania) P Mărmureanu (Switzerland) D Sturdza	3	9	1	7
(United Arab Republic) I El Shafei (New Zealand) B Fairlie	6	3	4	9	17
(Socialist Federal Republic of Yugoslavia) Z Franulović (South Africa) R Maud	4	6	6	7	19
(France) J-C Barclay (France) D Contet	8	6	9	6
(United States) D Dell (United States) J McManus	9	0	8	2
(Australia) R Crealy (Australia) A Stone	8	9	3	2
(Denmark) J Leschly (South Africa) R Moore	9	7	6	6
(West Germany) J Fassbender (West Germany) H-J Pohmann	4	4	8
(Australia) I Fletcher (Australia) B Phillips-Moore	6	6	9
(United States) T Gorman (United States) C Richey	6	3	6	6
Q	(South Africa) B Bertram (South Africa) W Freer	8	6	4	8
(Austria) H Kary (Austria) P Pokorny	1	3	3
(Netherlands) T Okker (United States) M Riessen	6	6	6
(United States) C Graebner (Brazil) T Koch	7	3	8	6
3	(South Africa) R Hewitt (South Africa) F McMillan	5	6	6	3

Second round
(Australia) R Howe (Australia) F Sedgman	4	9	3	2
(Socialist Federal Republic of Yugoslavia) Z Franulović (South Africa) R Maud	6	8	6	6
(France) J-C Barclay (France) D Contet	5	9	1	9	3
(Denmark) J Leschly (South Africa) R Moore	7	8	6	7	6
(Australia) I Fletcher (Australia) B Phillips-Moore	6	3	9	6
Q	(South Africa) B Bertram (South Africa) W Freer	2	6	8	2
(Netherlands) T Okker (United States) M Riessen	2	6	7	6	3
(United States) C Graebner (Brazil) T Koch	6	1	9	4	6

Third round
(Socialist Federal Republic of Yugoslavia) Z Franulović (South Africa) R Maud	6	6	4	9
(Denmark) J Leschly (South Africa) R Moore	3	4	6	8
(Australia) I Fletcher (Australia) B Phillips-Moore	2	6	2
(United States) C Graebner (Brazil) T Koch	6	8	6

Quarterfinals
(Socialist Federal Republic of Yugoslavia) Z Franulović (South Africa) R Maud	8	6	4	1
(United States) C Graebner (Brazil) T Koch	9	4	6	6

==== Section 4 ====
First round
(United States) R Lutz (United States) C Pasarell	6	6	6
(United States) R Barth (Denmark) T Ulrich	4	4	3
(New Zealand) O Parun (Socialist Federal Republic of Yugoslavia) N Špear	4	4	2
(United States) S Smith (United States) E van Dillen	6	6	6
(United States) A Ashe (United States) D Ralston	6	6	6
(South Africa) T Ryan (South Africa) D Schroder	4	4	4
(Hungary) S Baranyi (Hungary) P Szőke	9	7	9	5	12
(Australia) S Ball (Australia) G Masters	8	9	7	7	10
(Italy) F Bartoni (Italy) P Toci	4	3	3
(United Kingdom) M Cox (United Kingdom) G Stilwell	6	6	6
(Spain) A Gimeno (United Kingdom) R Taylor	6	6	6
(United Kingdom) G Battrick (United Kingdom) P Curtis	4	4	3
(United States) J Connors (United States) R Gonzales	w/o
(Czechoslovakia) F Pála (Czechoslovakia) V Zedník
(Spain) A Muñoz (Spain) M Orantes	1	2	4
2	(Australia) K Rosewall (Australia) F Stolle	6	6	6

Second round
(United States) R Lutz (United States) C Pasarell	1	4	4
(United States) S Smith (United States) E van Dillen	6	6	6
(United States) A Ashe (United States) D Ralston	6	6	6
(Hungary) S Baranyi (Hungary) P Szőke	3	1	3
(United Kingdom) M Cox (United Kingdom) G Stilwell	6	4	6	6
(Spain) A Gimeno (United Kingdom) R Taylor	4	6	3	4
(Czechoslovakia) F Pála (Czechoslovakia) V Zedník	4	4	7
2	(Australia) K Rosewall (Australia) F Stolle	6	6	9

Third round
(United States) S Smith (United States) E van Dillen	4	8	8
(United States) A Ashe (United States) D Ralston	6	9	9
(United Kingdom) M Cox (United Kingdom) G Stilwell	3	0	4
(Australia) K Rosewall (Australia) F Stolle	6	6	6

Quarterfinals
(United States) A Ashe (United States) D Ralston	7	6	2	6
2	(Australia) K Rosewall (Australia) F Stolle	5	3	6	1
