= 1971 Wimbledon Championships – Boys' singles =

Boys' singles
- 1971 Wimbledon Championships

Final
- Champion: (United States) Robert Kreiss
- Runner-up: (United Kingdom) Stephen Warboys
- Score: 2–6, 6–4, 6–3

Events
Singles	men	women		boys	girls
Doubles	men	women	mixed	boys	girls
← 1970 ·	Wimbledon Championships	· 1972 →

Robert Kreiss defeated Stephen Warboys in the final, 2–6, 6–4, 6–3 to win the boys' singles tennis title at the 1971 Wimbledon Championships.

== Draw ==
=== Key ===
- Q = Qualifier
- WC = Wild card
- LL = Lucky loser
- Alt = Alternate
- SE = Special exempt
- PR = Protected ranking
- ITF = ITF entry
- JE = Junior exempt
- w/o = Walkover
- r = Retired
- d = Defaulted
- SR = Special ranking

=== Finals ===
Semifinals
(Brazil) Joaquim Rasgado	3	4
(United States) Robert Kreiss	6	6
(India) Vijay Amritraj	3	7
(United Kingdom) Stephen Warboys	6	9

Final
(United States) Robert Kreiss	2	6	6
(United Kingdom) Stephen Warboys	6	4	3

=== Top half ===
First round
(Sweden) Björn Borg	1	6	2
(Brazil) Joaquim Rasgado	6	3	6
(Lebanon) R Haddad	0	1
(West Germany) Lutz Jelitto	6	6
(United Arab Emirates) AA Ibrahim	4	4
(France) Jean-François Caujolle	6	6
(Belgium) D Frere	4	0
(United States) Robert Kreiss	6	6
(Monaco) Bernard Balleret	0	7	4
(Czechoslovakia) Ivan Jankovský	6	5	6
(Sudan) S Talaat	7	1
(Netherlands) M Ruys	9	6

Second round
(Australia) Bill Durham	6	7
(Austria) D Koller	2	5
(Brazil) J Rasgado	6	6
(West Germany) L Jelitto	4	4
(France) J-F Caujolle	5	4
(United States) R Kreiss	7	6
(Czechoslovakia) I Jankovský	6	7
(Netherlands) M Ruys	3	5

Quarterfinals
(Australia) W Durham	3	6	5
(Brazil) J Rasgado	6	4	7
(United States) R Kreiss	7	6	6
(Czechoslovakia) I Jankovský	9	2	1

Semifinals
(Brazil) J Rasgado	3	4
(United States) R Kreiss	6	6

=== Bottom half ===
First round
(Spain) José Moreno	6	6
(Soviet Union) Aleksandr Bogomolov	2	2
(Hungary) Balázs Taróczy	6	6
(Italy) Corrado Barazzutti	1	0
(Mexico) Emilio Montaño	6	4
(India) Vijay Amritraj	8	6
(Republic of Ireland) K Menton	7	6
(Norway) S Skouen	5	1
(Jamaica) Compton Russell	6	6
(Denmark) N Rathlev	2	4

Second round
(Spain) J Moreno	6	6
(Hungary) B Taróczy	4	4
(India) V Amritraj	6	6
(Republic of Ireland) K Menton	1	2
(Jamaica) C Russell	6	6
(Switzerland) A Hufschmied	1	3
(United Kingdom) Stephen Warboys	6	6
(Socialist Federal Republic of Yugoslavia) Igor Košak	1	2

Quarterfinals
(Spain) J Moreno	4	0
(India) V Amritraj	6	6
(Jamaica) C Russell	4	9	2
(United Kingdom) S Warboys	6	8	6

Semifinals
(India) V Amritraj	3	7
(United Kingdom) S Warboys	6	9
