= 1971 Wimbledon Championships – Mixed doubles =

Mixed doubles
- 1971 Wimbledon Championships

Final
- Champions: (Australia) Owen Davidson (United States) Billie Jean King
- Runners-up: (United States) Marty Riessen (Australia) Margaret Court
- Score: 3–6, 6–2, 15–13

Details
- Draw: 80 (3 Q )
- Seeds: 4

Events
Singles	men	women		boys	girls
Doubles	men	women	mixed	boys	girls
← 1970 ·	Wimbledon Championships	· 1972 →

In the mixed doubles games of the 1971 Wimbledon Championships, Ilie Năstase and Rosie Casals were the defending champions, but lost in the semifinals to Owen Davidson and Billie Jean King.

Davidson and King defeated Marty Riessen and Margaret Court in the final, 3–6, 6–2, 15–13 to win the mixed doubles tennis title at the 1971 Wimbledon Championships.

Nirupama Mankad became the first Indian woman in the open era to play the main draw (and ultimately win a match) at a Grand Slam event.

== Seeds ==
1. (United States) Marty Riessen / (Australia) Margaret Court (final)
2. (Romania) Ilie Năstase / (United States) Rosie Casals (semifinals)
3. (Australia) Owen Davidson / (United States) Billie Jean King (champions)
4. (South Africa) Frew McMillan / (Australia) Judy Dalton (semifinals)

Click on the seed number of a player to go to their draw section.

== Draw ==
=== Key ===
- Q = Qualifier
- WC = Wild card
- LL = Lucky loser
- Alt = Alternate
- SE = Special exempt
- PR = Protected ranking
- ITF = ITF entry
- JE = Junior exempt
- w/o = Walkover
- r = Retired
- d = Defaulted
- SR = Special ranking

=== Finals ===
Quarterfinals
1	(United States) Marty Riessen (Australia) Margaret Court	6	6
Q	(United States) Larry Collins (United States) Wendy Appleby	3	2
4	(South Africa) Frew McMillan (Australia) Judy Dalton	7	6
(Brazil) Thomaz Koch (Uruguay) Fiorella Bonicelli	5	2
(South Africa) Bob Maud (Netherlands) Betty Stöve	8	7
3	(Australia) Owen Davidson (United States) Billie Jean King	9	9
(Rhodesia) Hank Irvine (Australia) Helen Gourlay	3	2
2	(Romania) Ilie Năstase (United States) Rosie Casals	6	6

Semifinals
1	(United States) Marty Riessen (Australia) Margaret Court	7	6
4	(South Africa) Frew McMillan (Australia) Judy Dalton	5	3
3	(Australia) Owen Davidson (United States) Billie Jean King	6	6
2	(Romania) Ilie Năstase (United States) Rosie Casals	4	1

Final
1	(United States) Marty Riessen (Australia) Margaret Court	6	2	13
3	(Australia) Owen Davidson (United States) Billie Jean King	3	6	15

=== Top half ===
==== Section 1 ====
First round

Second round
1	(United States) M Riessen (Australia) M Court	6	6
(Romania) S Dron (United Kingdom) M Greenwood	3	1
(Spain) A Muñoz (Spain) C Bustamante	1	0
(Italy) F Bartoni (Italy) M Giorgi	6	6
(Australia) G Masters (Australia) B Hawcroft	3	6	6
(United Kingdom) G Battrick (United Kingdom) C Camp	6	3	3
Q	(Australia) A Hammond (Australia) S Hole	3	4
(Australia) J Alexander (Australia) S Alexander	6	6

Third round
1	(United States) M Riessen (Australia) M Court	6	6
(Italy) F Bartoni (Italy) M Giorgi	3	1
(Australia) G Masters (Australia) B Hawcroft	7	5	4
(Australia) J Alexander (Australia) S Alexander	5	7	6

Fourth round
1	(United States) M Riessen (Australia) M Court	7	6
(Australia) J Alexander (Australia) S Alexander	5	2

==== Section 2 ====
First round

Second round
(Pakistan) M Iqbal (United Kingdom) J Fayter	2	3
(Australia) J Bartlett (Canada) J O'Hara	6	6
(New Zealand) O Parun (New Zealand) C Fleming	7	4	5
(United States) D Dell (Sweden) I Bentzer	5	6	7
(Austria) H Kary (Austria) M Hollingsworth	4	4
(South Africa) A Segal (Australia) L Robinson	6	6
(United Kingdom) P Curtis (Soviet Union) Z Jansone
Q	(United States) L Collins (United States) W Appleby	w/o

Third round
(Australia) J Bartlett (Canada) J O'Hara	6	1	7
(United States) D Dell (Sweden) I Bentzer	3	6	9
(South Africa) A Segal (Australia) L Robinson
Q	(United States) L Collins (United States) W Appleby	w/o

Fourth round
(United States) D Dell (Sweden) I Bentzer	3	6	6
Q	(United States) L Collins (United States) W Appleby	6	1	8

==== Section 3 ====
First round

Second round
4	(South Africa) F McMillan (Australia) J Dalton	6	6
(Japan) T Koura (Japan) K Sawamatsu	2	2
(United Kingdom) S Matthews (United Kingdom) E James	2	1
(South Africa) R Hewitt (Australia) E Goolagong	6	6
(South Africa) T Ryan (United States) P Austin	5	6
(United Kingdom) J Paish (United Kingdom) S Holdsworth	7	8
(Austria) P Pokorny (Austria) S Pachta	2	5
(United Kingdom) P Hutchins (United Kingdom) L Beaven	6	7

Third round
4	(South Africa) F McMillan (Australia) J Dalton	6	6
(South Africa) R Hewitt (Australia) E Goolagong	1	3
(United Kingdom) J Paish (United Kingdom) S Holdsworth	6	6
(United Kingdom) P Hutchins (United Kingdom) L Beaven	1	4

Fourth round
4	(South Africa) F McMillan (Australia) J Dalton	6	6
(United Kingdom) J Paish (United Kingdom) S Holdsworth	1	1

==== Section 4 ====
First round
Q	(India) A Amritraj (India) N Mankad	6	7
(United Arab Republic) I El Shafei (Italy) L Pericoli	4	5
(Chile) J Pinto Bravo (Argentina) AM Arias	6	6
(United States) R Perry (United States) T Fretz	4	3
(United Kingdom) J Clifton (United Kingdom) A Cowie	1	3
(Brazil) T Koch (Uruguay) F Bonicelli	6	6
(South Africa) C Drysdale (South Africa) J Drysdale	6	5	6
(Japan) J Kamiwazumi (Japan) Y Matsuda	3	7	4
(South Africa) D Schroder (South Africa) L Rossouw	9	4	4
(United Kingdom) J Drobný (United Kingdom) J Williams	7	6	6
(Australia) R Crealy (Australia) K Harris	6	6
(Rhodesia) A Pattison (South Africa) D Botha	3	1
(United States) F Froehling (Australia) W Gilchrist	7	7
(Brazil) JE Mandarino (Spain) C Mandarino	5	5
(Colombia) I Molina (Argentina) R Giscafré	3	6	3
(United Kingdom) S Warboys (United States) PA Reese	6	3	6

Second round
Q	(India) A Amritraj (India) N Mankad	6	2	1
(Chile) J Pinto Bravo (Argentina) AM Arias	4	6	6
(Brazil) T Koch (Uruguay) F Bonicelli	6	7
(South Africa) C Drysdale (South Africa) J Drysdale	1	5
(United Kingdom) J Drobný (United Kingdom) J Williams	3	8
(Australia) R Crealy (Australia) K Harris	6	9
(United States) F Froehling (Australia) W Gilchrist	3	3^{r}
(United Kingdom) S Warboys (United States) PA Reese	6	3

Third round
(Chile) J Pinto Bravo (Argentina) AM Arias	1	4
(Brazil) T Koch (Uruguay) F Bonicelli	6	6
(Australia) R Crealy (Australia) K Harris	4	6	6
(United Kingdom) S Warboys (United States) PA Reese	6	1	2

Fourth round
(Brazil) T Koch (Uruguay) F Bonicelli	7	6
(Australia) R Crealy (Australia) K Harris	5	3

=== Bottom half ===
==== Section 5 ====
First round
(Australia) J Moore (Australia) F Moore	6	4	6
(United Kingdom) R Wilson (United Kingdom) S Brasher	4	6	8
(United States) F Schroeder (United States) J Newberry	2	1
(Australia) C Dibley (Australia) K Melville	6	6
(Australia) R Ruffels (Australia) L Hunt	5	6	6
(Hungary) S Baranyi (Czechoslovakia) M Holubová	7	1	1
(United States) J McManus (United States) P Teeguarden	6	6
(Czechoslovakia) Š Koudelka (South Africa) J Koudelka	1	4
(New Zealand) J McDonald (United Kingdom) R Bentley	2	1
(Soviet Union) A Metreveli (Soviet Union) O Morozova	6	6
(Greece) N Kalogeropoulos (Greece) C-A Kalogeropoulos	7	3	1
(South Africa) B Bertram (South Africa) E Emmanuel	5	6	6
(Denmark) T Ulrich (United States) J Heldman	7	6
(Soviet Union) A Bogomolov (Soviet Union) M Kroschina	5	4
(Chile) P Rodríguez (Chile) M Rodríguez	4	2
(South Africa) R Maud (Netherlands) B Stöve	6	6

Second round
(United Kingdom) R Wilson (United Kingdom) S Brasher	8	2
(Australia) C Dibley (Australia) K Melville	9	6
(Australia) R Ruffels (Australia) L Hunt	3	5
(United States) J McManus (United States) P Teeguarden	6	7
(Soviet Union) A Metreveli (Soviet Union) O Morozova	6	6
(South Africa) B Bertram (South Africa) E Emmanuel	2	4
(Denmark) T Ulrich (United States) J Heldman	6	2	3
(South Africa) R Maud (Netherlands) B Stöve	4	6	6

Third round
(Australia) C Dibley (Australia) K Melville	6	6
(United States) J McManus (United States) P Teeguarden	3	3
(Soviet Union) A Metreveli (Soviet Union) O Morozova	6	3	4
(South Africa) R Maud (Netherlands) B Stöve	3	6	6

Fourth round
(Australia) C Dibley (Australia) K Melville	4	8
(South Africa) R Maud (Netherlands) B Stöve	6	9

==== Section 6 ====
First round

Second round
(Italy) S Palmieri (Netherlands) G Walhof	9	7
(United Kingdom) A Mills (United Kingdom) J Mills	8	5
(Australia) A McDonald (United States) P Hogan	6	3	6
(Australia) W Bowrey (Australia) L Bowrey	3	6	3
(United Kingdom) R Taylor (United Kingdom) F Taylor	8	5	1
(Australia) R Howe (United Kingdom) V Wade	6	7	6
(United States) M Elliott (United States) G Hansen	3	4
3	(Australia) O Davidson (United States) BJ King	6	6

Third round
(Italy) S Palmieri (Netherlands) G Walhof	2	8
(Australia) A McDonald (United States) P Hogan	6	9
(Australia) R Howe (United Kingdom) V Wade	1	1
3	(Australia) O Davidson (United States) BJ King	6	6

Fourth round
(Australia) A McDonald (United States) P Hogan	4	2
3	(Australia) O Davidson (United States) BJ King	6	6

==== Section 7 ====
First round

Second round
(Rhodesia) H Irvine (Australia) H Gourlay	w/o
(United States) R Lutz (United States) N Gunter
(United States) G Seewagen (United States) K Pigeon	6	6
(United Kingdom) H Truman (United Kingdom) C Janes	0	4
(Sweden) B Folke (Sweden) C Sandberg	w/o
(West Germany) J Fassbender (West Germany) H Orth
(Australia) R Keldie (United Kingdom) W Shaw	6	6
(Australia) B Phillips-Moore (Australia) A Phillips-Moore	3	3

Third round
(Rhodesia) H Irvine (Australia) H Gourlay	6	6
(United States) G Seewagen (United States) K Pigeon	3	4
(Sweden) B Folke (Sweden) C Sandberg	6	3	4
(Australia) R Keldie (United Kingdom) W Shaw	3	6	6

Fourth round
(Rhodesia) H Irvine (Australia) H Gourlay	3	7	6
(Australia) R Keldie (United Kingdom) W Shaw	6	5	2

==== Section 8 ====
First round

Second round
(United States) T Gorman (United States) V Ziegenfuss	6	6
(United Kingdom) C McHugo (United Kingdom) W Hall	2	2
(United States) R Barth (United States) D Carter-Triolo
(South Africa) P Cramer (South Africa) S van Brandis	w/o
(Spain) M Orantes (Spain) AM Estalella	6	6
(Hungary) P Szőke (Hungary) É Szabó	3	4
(France) P Barthès (France) F Dürr	2	1
2	(Romania) I Năstase (United States) R Casals	6	6

Third round
(United States) T Gorman (United States) V Ziegenfuss	w/o
(South Africa) P Cramer (South Africa) S van Brandis
(Spain) M Orantes (Spain) AM Estalella
2	(Romania) I Năstase (United States) R Casals	w/o

Fourth round
(United States) T Gorman (United States) V Ziegenfuss
2	(Romania) I Năstase (United States) R Casals	w/o
