= 1972 US Open – Mixed doubles =

Mixed doubles
- 1972 US Open

Final
- Champions: (United States) Marty Riessen (Australia) Margaret Court
- Runners-up: (Romania) Ilie Năstase (United States) Rosemary Casals
- Score: 6–3, 7–5

Details
- Draw: 51
- Seeds: 6

Events
| Singles | men | women | | boys | girls |
| Doubles | men | women | mixed | boys | girls |
| WC Singles | men | women | quad |
| WC Doubles | men | women | quad |
| Legends | men | women | mixed |
| ← 1971 · | US Open | · 1973 → |

Owen Davidson and Billie Jean King were the defending champions but lost in the semifinals to Ilie Năstase and Rosemary Casals.

Marty Riessen and Margaret Court won in the final 6–3, 7–5 against Ilie Năstase and Rosemary Casals.

== Seeds ==
1. (Romania) Ilie Năstase / (United States) Rosie Casals (final)
2. (United States) Marty Riessen / (Australia) Margaret Court (champions)
3. (Australia) Owen Davidson / (United States) Billie Jean King (semifinals)
4. (South Africa) Frew McMillan / (United Kingdom) Virginia Wade (first round)
5. (South Africa) Bob Maud / (Netherlands) Betty Stöve (quarterfinals)
6. (United States) Dennis Ralston / (France) Françoise Dürr (third round)

== Draw ==
=== Key ===
- Q = Qualifier
- WC = Wild card
- LL = Lucky loser
- Alt = Alternate
- SE = Special exempt
- PR = Protected ranking
- ITF = ITF entry
- JE = Junior exempt
- w/o = Walkover
- r = Retired
- d = Defaulted
- SR = Special ranking

=== Finals ===
Quarterfinals
1 | (Romania) Ilie Năstase (United States) Rosie Casals | 6 | 6
(United States) Jeff Borowiak (United States) Pam Teeguarden | 3 | 3
3 | (Australia) Owen Davidson (United States) Billie Jean King | 6 | 6
5 | (South Africa) Bob Maud (Netherlands) Betty Stöve | 3 | 4
(Australia) Bob Carmichael (Australia) Lesley Hunt | 6 | 7
(South Africa) Pat Cramer (South Africa) Patricia Pretorius | 3 | 6
(United States) Jimmy Connors (United States) Chris Evert | 4 | 4
2 | (United States) Marty Riessen (Australia) Margaret Court | 6 | 6

Semifinals
1 | (Romania) Ilie Năstase (United States) Rosie Casals | 4 | 6 | 7
3 | (Australia) Owen Davidson (United States) Billie Jean King | 6 | 4 | 6
(Australia) Bob Carmichael (Australia) Lesley Hunt | 7 | 3 | 3
2 | (United States) Marty Riessen (Australia) Margaret Court | 6 | 6 | 6

Final
1 | (Romania) Ilie Năstase (United States) Rosie Casals | 3 | 5
2 | (United States) Marty Riessen (Australia) Margaret Court | 6 | 7

=== Top half ===
==== Section 1 ====
First round
(Soviet Union) V Korotkov (Soviet Union) M Kroschina | 6 | 7
(Australia) R Case (Republic of Ireland) S Minford | 3 | 5

Second round
1 | (Romania) I Năstase (United States) R Casals | w/o
(United States) D Birchmore (United States) P Bostrom
(India) V Amritraj (United Kingdom) P Moor | 6 | 4 | 2
(Australia) B Howe (United States) Sandy Stap | 3 | 6 | 6
(United States) H Richardson (United States) A Kiyomura | 3 | 4
(United States) V Gerulaitis (United States) C Graebner | 6 | 6
(United States) J Borowiak (United States) P Teeguarden | 4 | 6 | 6
(Soviet Union) V Korotkov (Soviet Union) M Kroschina | 6 | 3 | 4

Third round
1 | (Romania) I Năstase (United States) R Casals | 6 | 6
(Australia) B Howe (United States) Sandy Stap | 2 | 2
(United States) V Gerulaitis (United States) C Graebner | 5 | 6
(United States) J Borowiak (United States) P Teeguarden | 7 | 7

Quarterfinals
1 | (Romania) I Năstase (United States) R Casals | 6 | 6
(United States) J Borowiak (United States) P Teeguarden | 3 | 3

==== Section 2 ====
First round
3 | (Australia) O Davidson (United States) BJ King | 7 | 6
(Australia) E Ewert (Australia) K Harris | 6 | 0
(Australia) C Dibley (Australia) K Krantzcke | 6 | 6
(United States) P Talbert (United States) B Smith | 3 | 2
(Australia) R Keldie (Australia) C Doerner | 7 | 4 | 1
(Australia) I Fletcher (United States) M Schallau | 5 | 6 | 6
(Pakistan) S Meer (United Kingdom) C Molesworth | 6 | 6
(United States) T Ware (Rhodesia) S Hudson-Beck | 2 | 3
5 | (South Africa) B Maud (Netherlands) B Stöve | 5 | 7 | 6
(France) J-B Chanfreau (United States) M Redondo | 7 | 6 | 4
(United States) G Mulloy (United States) A Gibson | 6 | 4 | 3
(United States) E Scott (United States) C Martinez | 4 | 6 | 6
(South Africa) D Schroder (South Africa) L Rossouw | 6 | 6 | 6
(United States) S Siegel (United States) W Appleby | 7 | 4 | 1
(Soviet Union) T Kakulia (Soviet Union) O Morozova | 6 | 6
(Australia) M Anderson (Australia) B Hawcroft | 2 | 4

Second round
3 | (Australia) O Davidson (United States) BJ King | 6 | 7
(Australia) C Dibley (Australia) K Krantzcke | 0 | 6
(Australia) I Fletcher (United States) M Schallau | 6 | 6
(Pakistan) S Meer (United Kingdom) C Molesworth | 3 | 2
5 | (South Africa) B Maud (Netherlands) B Stöve | 6 | 6
(United States) E Scott (United States) C Martinez | 3 | 0
(South Africa) D Schroder (South Africa) L Rossouw | 4 | 4
(Soviet Union) T Kakulia (Soviet Union) O Morozova | 6 | 6

Third round
3 | (Australia) O Davidson (United States) BJ King | 6 | 6
(Australia) I Fletcher (United States) M Schallau | 3 | 1
5 | (South Africa) B Maud (Netherlands) B Stöve | 6 | 6
(Soviet Union) T Kakulia (Soviet Union) O Morozova | 1 | 4

Quarterfinals
3 | (Australia) O Davidson (United States) BJ King | 6 | 6
5 | (South Africa) B Maud (Netherlands) B Stöve | 3 | 4

=== Bottom half ===
==== Section 3 ====
First round
(Australia) B Carmichael (Australia) L Hunt | 6 | 6
(United States) J McManus (United States) W Overton | 3 | 3
(Australia) G Masters (United States) K Blake | 6 | 3 | 6
(United States) B Brown (United States) M Cooper | 4 | 6 | 3
(Mexico) T Palafox (United States) M Aschner | 3 | 2
(New Zealand) J Simpson (United Kingdom) L Beaven | 6 | 6
(Jamaica) R Russell (Canada) V Berner | 3 | 4
6 | (United States) D Ralston (France) F Dürr | 6 | 6
(Australia) W Durham (United States) S Stap | 5 | 2
(Australia) T Addison (United States) J Evert | 7 | 6
(India) A Amritraj (South Africa) B Kirk | 1 | 2
(United States) D Dell (United States) V Ziegenfuss | 6 | 6
(United States) M Machette (United States) S Walsh | 6 | 7
(United Kingdom) P Curtis (United States) L Tuero | 1 | 5
(South Africa) P Cramer (South Africa) P Pretorius | 7 | 7
4 | (South Africa) F McMillan (United Kingdom) V Wade | 6 | 6

Second round
(Australia) B Carmichael (Australia) L Hunt | 6 | 6
(Australia) G Masters (United States) K Blake | 4 | 1
(New Zealand) J Simpson (United Kingdom) L Beaven | 2 | 4
6 | (United States) D Ralston (France) F Dürr | 6 | 6
(Australia) T Addison (United States) J Evert | 6 | 4 | 6
(United States) D Dell (United States) V Ziegenfuss | 4 | 6 | 4
(United States) M Machette (United States) S Walsh | 6 | 4
(South Africa) P Cramer (South Africa) P Pretorius | 7 | 6

Third round
(Australia) B Carmichael (Australia) L Hunt | 6 | 6
6 | (United States) D Ralston (France) F Dürr | 4 | 3
(Australia) T Addison (United States) J Evert | 2 | 5
(South Africa) P Cramer (South Africa) P Pretorius | 6 | 7

Quarterfinals
(Australia) B Carmichael (Australia) L Hunt | 6 | 7
(South Africa) P Cramer (South Africa) P Pretorius | 3 | 6

==== Section 4 ====
First round
(Colombia) J Velasco (Ecuador) ME Guzmán | 5 | 6 | 3
(Rhodesia) A Pattison (Rhodesia) D Pattison | 7 | 2 | 6
(United States) J Connors (United States) C Evert | 6 | 6
(United Kingdom) S Warboys (Australia) W Gilchrist | 1 | 4

Second round
(Rhodesia) A Pattison (Rhodesia) D Pattison | 2 | 2
(United States) J Connors (United States) C Evert | 6 | 6
(Colombia) I Molina (United States) K Kemmer | 5 | 6 | 7
(France) P Dominguez (France) N Fuchs | 7 | 4 | 6
(Australia) F Stolle (United Kingdom) A Jones | w/o
(Chile) P Cornejo (Colombia) I Fernández de Soto
(United States) W Higgins (South Africa) E Emmanuel | 3 | 4
2 | (United States) M Riessen (Australia) M Court | 6 | 6

Third round
(United States) J Connors (United States) C Evert | w/o
(Colombia) I Molina (United States) K Kemmer
(Australia) F Stolle (United Kingdom) A Jones
2 | (United States) M Riessen (Australia) M Court | w/o

Quarterfinals
(United States) J Connors (United States) C Evert | 4 | 4
2 | (United States) M Riessen (Australia) M Court | 6 | 6
