= Joaquim Rasgado =

Brazilian tennis player

- Full name: Joaquim Rasgado Jr.
- Country (sports): Brazil
- Born: 24 March 1953 (age 71)
- College: University of Miami

Singles
- Career record: 2–7
- Highest ranking: No. 183 (Dec 12, 1976)

Grand Slam singles results
- Wimbledon: Q1 (1971)
- US Open: 1R (1975)

Joaquim Rasgado Jr. (born 24 March 1953), also known as Joe Rasgado, is a Brazilian former professional tennis player active on tour in the 1970s.

A native of Rio de Janeiro, Rasgado had a win over Björn Borg in the junior singles draw at the 1971 Wimbledon Championships, going on to reach the semi-finals.

Rasgado played collegiate tennis for the University of Miami and twice earned All-American honors (1974 & 1975).

As a qualifier at the 1975 US Open, Rasgado came up against the 14th seeded Vitas Gerulaitis in the opening round and managed to win the first set, before tiring and going down in three.

Rasgado was inducted into the University of Miami Sports Hall of Fame in 1991.
