= 1972 US Open – Women's doubles =

Women's doubles
- 1972 US Open

Final
- Champion: (France) Françoise Dürr (Netherlands) Betty Stöve
- Runner-up: (Australia) Margaret Court (United Kingdom) Virginia Wade
- Score: 6–3, 1–6, 6–3

Details
- Draw: 32
- Seeds: 4

Events
Singles	men	women		boys	girls
Doubles	men	women	mixed	boys	girls
WC Singles	men	women	quad
WC Doubles	men	women	quad
Legends	men	women	mixed
← 1971 ·	US Open	· 1973 →

Rosemary Casals and Judy Dalton were the reigning champions but Judy Dalton did not compete this year. Rosemary Casals teamed up with Billie Jean King and lost in semifinals to Françoise Dürr and Betty Stöve.

Françoise Dürr and Betty Stöve won the title by defeating Margaret Court and Virginia Wade 6–3, 1–6, 6–3 in the final.

== Seeds ==
1. (United States) Rosie Casals / (United States) Billie Jean King (semifinals)
2. (Australia) Margaret Court / (United Kingdom) Virginia Wade (final)
3. (Australia) Evonne Goolagong / (Australia) Lesley Hunt (semifinals)
4. (France) Françoise Dürr / (Netherlands) Betty Stöve (champions)

== Draw ==
=== Key ===
- Q = Qualifier
- WC = Wild card
- LL = Lucky loser
- Alt = Alternate
- ITF = ITF entry
- PR = Protected ranking
- SR = Special ranking
- SE = Special exempt
- JE = Junior exempt
- JR = Junior Accelerator Programme entrant
- CO = College Accelerator Programme entrant
- NG = Next Gen Accelerator Program entrant
- w/o = Walkover
- r = Retired
- d = Defaulted

=== Finals ===
Semifinals
2	(Australia) Margaret Court (United Kingdom) Virginia Wade	7	7
3	(Australia) Evonne Goolagong (Australia) Lesley Hunt	6	5
4	(France) Françoise Dürr (Netherlands) Betty Stöve	7	3	6
1	(United States) Rosie Casals (United States) Billie Jean King	6	6	4

Final
2	(Australia) Margaret Court (United Kingdom) Virginia Wade	3	6	3
4	(France) Françoise Dürr (Netherlands) Betty Stöve	6	1	6

=== Top half ===
First round
2	(Australia) M Court (United Kingdom) V Wade	6	6
(Australia) B Hawcroft (Sweden) C Sandberg	1	1
(Rhodesia) S Hudson-Beck (Republic of Ireland) S Minford	2	5
(United States) B Garcia (United States) J Heldman	6	7
(United States) Jill Schwikert (United States) Joy Schwikert	2	3
(United States) W Overton (United States) V Ziegenfuss	6	6
(United States) M Redondo (United States) L Tenney	1	3
(United States) C Evert (United States) J Evert	6	6
3	(Australia) E Goolagong (Australia) L Hunt	6	6
(United States) J Metcalf (Sweden) M Pegel	1	0
(United States) W Appleby (United States) T O'Shaughnessy	6	7	3
(United States) K Blake (United Kingdom) J Cooper	7	5	6
(United States) M Aschner (United States) P Austin	1	1
(Australia) K Harris (Australia) K Melville	6	6
(Australia) W Gilchrist (United States) S Walsh	6	5	6
(United States) P Bostrom (United States) A Lebedeff	2	7	3

Second round
2	(Australia) M Court (United Kingdom) V Wade	6	6
(United States) B Garcia (United States) J Heldman	0	1
(United States) W Overton (United States) V Ziegenfuss	6	6
(United States) C Evert (United States) J Evert	4	1
3	(Australia) E Goolagong (Australia) L Hunt	6	6
(United States) K Blake (United Kingdom) J Cooper	0	1
(Australia) K Harris (Australia) K Melville	6	6
(Australia) W Gilchrist (United States) S Walsh	4	2

Quarterfinals
2	(Australia) M Court (United Kingdom) V Wade	6	6
(United States) W Overton (United States) V Ziegenfuss	4	3
3	(Australia) E Goolagong (Australia) L Hunt	6	7
(Australia) K Harris (Australia) K Melville	2	5

Semifinals
2	(Australia) M Court (United Kingdom) V Wade	7	7
3	(Australia) E Goolagong (Australia) L Hunt	6	5

=== Bottom half ===
First round
(United States) L Fleming (United States) A Kiyomura	6	7	6
(Australia) C Doerner (Rhodesia) D Pattison	7	6	3
(South Africa) B Kirk (South Africa) P Pretorius	6	6
(United Kingdom) L Beaven (United Kingdom) V Burton	4	4
(United States) M Cooper (United States) B Downs	6	6
(Soviet Union) M Kroschina (United States) L Tuero	4	3
(Australia) H Gourlay (Australia) K Krantzcke
4	(France) F Dürr (Netherlands) B Stöve	w/o
(France) N Fuchs (Chile) AM Pinto Bravo	0	1
(South Africa) E Emmanuel (United States) C Martinez	6	6
(United States) P Hogan (Soviet Union) O Morozova	5	6	7
(United States) J Anthony (United States) P Teeguarden	7	3	5
(Uruguay) F Bonicelli (Colombia) I Fernández de Soto	6	6
(United States) L duPont (United States) M Schallau	4	3
(United States) M Louie (South Africa) L Rossouw	1	0
1	(United States) R Casals (United States) BJ King	6	6

Second round
(United States) L Fleming (United States) A Kiyomura	4	6
(South Africa) B Kirk (South Africa) P Pretorius	6	7
(United States) M Cooper (United States) B Downs	5	4
4	(France) F Dürr (Netherlands) B Stöve	7	6
(South Africa) E Emmanuel (United States) C Martinez	2	4
(United States) P Hogan (Soviet Union) O Morozova	6	6
(Uruguay) F Bonicelli (Colombia) I Fernández de Soto	6	4
1	(United States) R Casals (United States) BJ King	7	6

Quarterfinals
(South Africa) B Kirk (South Africa) P Pretorius	5	5
4	(France) F Dürr (Netherlands) B Stöve	7	7
(United States) P Hogan (Soviet Union) O Morozova	6	3	2
1	(United States) R Casals (United States) BJ King	4	6	6

Semifinals
4	(France) F Dürr (Netherlands) B Stöve	7	3	6
1	(United States) R Casals (United States) BJ King	6	6	4
