= Wendy Appleby =

American tennis player

- Country (sports): United States
- Born: April 30, 1952 (age 72)

Singles

Grand Slam singles results
- Wimbledon: 1R (1972)
- US Open: 2R (1972)

Doubles

Grand Slam doubles results
- Wimbledon: 2R (1972)
- US Open: 1R (1972)

Grand Slam mixed doubles results
- Wimbledon: QF (1971)
- US Open: 1R (1972)

Wendy Appleby (born April 30, 1952) is an American former professional tennis player.

Appleby, from Los Angeles, was active on the professional tour in the 1970s. She reached the mixed doubles quarter-finals of the 1971 Wimbledon Championships, as a qualifying pairing with Larry Collins.

Following her tennis career she was a police officer in Oakland for 27 years.
