= 1972 US Open – Women's singles =

Tennis tournament held in 1972

Women's singles
- 1972 US Open

Final
- Champion: (United States) Billie Jean King
- Runner-up: (Australia) Kerry Melville
- Score: 6–3, 7–5

Details
- Draw: 80
- Seeds: 9

Events
Singles	men	women		boys	girls
Doubles	men	women	mixed	boys	girls
WC Singles	men	women	quad
WC Doubles	men	women	quad
Legends	men	women	mixed
← 1971 ·	US Open	· 1973 →

Defending champion Billie Jean King defeated Kerry Melville in the final, 6–3, 7–5 to win the women's singles tennis title at the 1972 US Open. It was her third US Open singles title and ninth major singles title overall. For the second consecutive year and third time in her career, King did not lose a set during the tournament.

== Seeds ==
The seeded players are listed below. Billie Jean King is the champion; others show the round in which they were eliminated.

1. (United States) Billie Jean King (champion)
2. (Australia) Evonne Goolagong (third round)
3. (United States) Chris Evert (semifinalist)
4. (United States) Rosie Casals (quarterfinalist)
5. (Australia) Margaret Court (semifinalist)
6. (United States) Nancy Richey Gunter (first round)
7. (France) Françoise Dürr (third round)
8. (United Kingdom) Virginia Wade (quarterfinalist)
9. (Australia) Kerry Melville (finalist)

== Draw ==
=== Key ===
- Q = Qualifier
- WC = Wild card
- LL = Lucky loser
- r = Retired

=== Final eight ===
Quarterfinals
1	(United States) Billie Jean King	6	7
8	(United Kingdom) Virginia Wade	2	5
4	(United States) Rosie Casals	4	6	4
5	(Australia) Margaret Court	6	4	6
(Soviet Union) Olga Morozova	6	3	6
3	(United States) Chris Evert	3	6	7
9	(Australia) Kerry Melville	6	6
(United States) Pam Teeguarden	0	2

Semifinals
1	(United States) Billie Jean King	6	6
5	(Australia) Margaret Court	4	4
3	(United States) Chris Evert	4	2
9	(Australia) Kerry Melville	6	6

Finals
1	(United States) Billie Jean King	6	7
9	(Australia) Kerry Melville	3	5

=== Earlier rounds ===
==== Section 1 ====
First round
1	(United States) King	6	6
(United States) Hogan	3	2
(South Africa) Emmanuel	7	4	6
(United States) Tuero	6	6	3
(United States) Walsh	7	3	6
(Indonesia) Liem	6	6	3
(United States) Stap	4	6	6
(United States) Beattie	6	4	3
8	(United Kingdom) Wade	6	6
(Colombia) Fernández-De Soto	4	3
(United States) Anthony	2	6	6
(United States) Newberry	6	2	3
(United States) Downs	6	6
(United Kingdom) Molesworth	2	4
(Republic of Ireland) Minford	6	6
(United States) Austin	1	1

Second round
1	(United States) King	6	6
(South Africa) Emmanuel	1	3
(United States) Walsh	7	3	6
(United States) Stap	5	6	4
8	(United Kingdom) Wade	6	7
(United States) Anthony	4	5
(United States) Downs	6	7
(Republic of Ireland) Minford	4	6

Third round
1	(United States) King	6	6
(United States) Walsh	4	4
8	(United Kingdom) Wade	6	6
(United States) Downs	3	2

Quarterfinals
1	(United States) King	6	7
8	(United Kingdom) Wade	2	5

==== Section 2 ====
First round
4	(United States) Casals	6	6
(France) Fuchs	1	2
(United States) Ziegenfuss	6	3	6
(Australia) Doerner	1	6	0
(Uruguay) Bonicelli	6	6
(Canada) Berner	3	4
(Australia) Gilchrist	6	6
(Ecuador) Guzmán	0	3
5	(Australia) Court	6	6
(United States) Metcalf	2	1
(Australia) Hawcroft	6	6
(Chile) Pinto Bravo	3	4
(United States) Appleby	6	6
(United Kingdom) Moor	3	3
(Australia) Hunt	6	6
(United States) Evert	2	1

Second round
4	(United States) Casals	6	6
(United States) Ziegenfuss	3	4
(Uruguay) Bonicelli	6	7
(Australia) Gilchrist	2	6
5	(Australia) Court	6	6
(Australia) Hawcroft	0	0
(United States) Appleby	1	0
(Australia) Hunt	6	6

Third round
4	(United States) Casals	6	6
(Uruguay) Bonicelli	0	4
5	(Australia) Court	6	6
(Australia) Hunt	2	1

Quarterfinals
4	(United States) Casals	4	6	4
5	(Australia) Court	6	4	6

==== Section 3 ====
First round
(United States) Overton	6	1	6
(Italy) Nasuelli	1	6	2
(Netherlands) Stöve	3	6	6
(United States) Fleming	6	0	1
(Soviet Union) Morozova	6	5	6
(United States) Kemmer	3	7	0
(Japan) Sawamatsu	6	4	6
6	(United States) Richey Gunter	4	6	3
(United States) Heldman	4	6	6
(United States) Blake	6	4	3
(United States) duPont	6	6
(United States) Alvarez	1	2
(United States) Redondo	6	6
(United States) O'Shaughnessy	1	3
3	(United States) Evert	6	6
(United States) Tenney	1	1

Second round
(United States) Overton	2	2
(Netherlands) Stöve	6	6
(Soviet Union) Morozova	6	6
(Japan) Sawamatsu	4	4
(United States) Heldman	6	7
(United States) duPont	3	6
(United States) Redondo	1	2
3	(United States) Evert	6	6

Third round
(Netherlands) Stöve	3	5
(Soviet Union) Morozova	6	7
(United States) Heldman	1	2
3	(United States) Evert	6	6

Quarterfinals
(Soviet Union) Morozova	6	3	6
3	(United States) Evert	3	6	7

==== Section 4 ====
First round
(United States) Martinez	6	6
(Italy) Vido	0	4
9	(Australia) Melville	6	6
(Soviet Union) Kroschina	2	4
(United States) Pigeon	6	6
(United States) Vinton	1	1
7	(France) Dürr	6	6
(United States) Garcia	4	1
(United States) Teeguarden	6	6
(Sweden) Sandberg	2	4
(United States) Schallau	6	6
(Australia) Gourlay	4	3
(Australia) Krantzcke	6	6
(United Kingdom) Beaven	2	2
2	(Australia) Goolagong	6	6
(South Africa) Kirk	2	2

Second round
(United States) Martinez	4	2
9	(Australia) Melville	6	6
(United States) Pigeon	7	1	4
7	(France) Dürr	6	6	6
(United States) Teeguarden	6	6
(United States) Schallau	4	4
(Australia) Krantzcke	3	5
2	(Australia) Goolagong	6	7

Third round
9	(Australia) Melville	1	6	6
7	(France) Dürr	6	0	2
(United States) Teeguarden	7	6
2	(Australia) Goolagong	5	1

Quarterfinals
9	(Australia) Melville	6	6
(United States) Teeguarden	0	2

Preceded by 1972 Wimbledon Championships – Women's singles	Grand Slam women's singles	Succeeded by 1973 Australian Open – Women's singles
