= 1971 Wimbledon Championships – Girls' singles =

Girls' singles
- 1971 Wimbledon Championships

Final
- Champion: (Soviet Union) Marina Kroschina
- Runner-up: (Republic of Ireland) Sue Minford
- Score: 6–4, 6–4

Details
- Draw: 21

Events
Singles	men	women		boys	girls
Doubles	men	women	mixed	boys	girls
← 1970 ·	Wimbledon Championships	· 1972 →

Marina Kroschina defeated Sue Minford in the final, 6–4, 6–4 to win the girls' singles tennis title at the 1971 Wimbledon Championships.

== Draw ==
=== Key ===
- Q = Qualifier
- WC = Wild card
- LL = Lucky loser
- Alt = Alternate
- SE = Special exempt
- PR = Protected ranking
- ITF = ITF entry
- JE = Junior exempt
- w/o = Walkover
- r = Retired
- d = Defaulted
- SR = Special ranking

=== Finals ===
Semifinals
(Italy) Rosalba Vido	4	2
(Republic of Ireland) Sue Minford	6	6
(United States) Eliza Pande	6	0	3
(Soviet Union) Marina Kroschina	4	6	6

Final
(Republic of Ireland) Sue Minford	4	4
(Soviet Union) Marina Kroschina	6	6

=== Top half ===
First round
(Sweden) I Larsson	3	1
(Republic of Ireland) Sue Minford	6	6
(Spain) Vicky Baldovinos	3	7	11
(Greece) A Koutsouris	6	5	9
(Rhodesia) Sally Hudson-Beck	6	6
(Malaysia) R Menon	0	0

Second round
(Switzerland) Susi Eichenberger	2	1
(United Kingdom) Glynis Coles	6	6
(Brazil) G Schroeder	4	0
(Italy) Rosalba Vido	6	6
(Austria) A Clementschitsch	0	1
(Republic of Ireland) S Minford	6	6
(Spain) V Baldovinos	2	7
(Rhodesia) S Hudson-Beck	6	9

Quarterfinals
(United Kingdom) G Coles	6	1	5
(Italy) R Vido	2	6	7
(Republic of Ireland) S Minford	6	6
(Rhodesia) S Hudson-Beck	2	1

Semifinals
(Italy) R Vido	4	2
(Republic of Ireland) S Minford	6	6

=== Bottom half ===
First round
(United States) Eliza Pande	6	6
(Netherlands) D Falkenburg	2	1
(Belgium) M de Witte	6	6
(Norway) E Steenfeldt Foss	3	2

Second round
(United States) E Pande	6	6
(Belgium) M de Witte	3	4
(Czechoslovakia) Renáta Tomanová	6	6
(Monaco) D Garros	1	0
(West Germany) B Portscheller	2	1
(Soviet Union) Marina Kroschina	6	6
(Socialist Federal Republic of Yugoslavia) Mima Jaušovec	6	6
(Denmark) AG Quist	0	2

Quarterfinals
(United States) E Pande	6	7
(Czechoslovakia) R Tomanová	2	5
(Soviet Union) M Kroschina	6	6
(Socialist Federal Republic of Yugoslavia) M Jaušovec	2	1

Semifinals
(United States) E Pande	6	0	3
(Soviet Union) M Kroschina	4	6	6
