= Hank Irvine =

Rhodesian-born American tennis player

- Full name: Douglas Irvine
- Country (sports): Rhodesia
- Born: September 1, 1943 (age 82) Bulawayo, Southern Rhodesia

Singles
- Career record: 12–18

Grand Slam singles results
- Wimbledon: 3R (1971)
- US Open: 1R (1971)

Doubles
- Career record: 6–15

Grand Slam doubles results
- Wimbledon: 3R (1971)
- US Open: 2R (1970, 1971, 1972)

Grand Slam mixed doubles results
- Wimbledon: SF (1970)
- US Open: QF (1971)

Douglas "Hank" Irvine (born September 1, 1943) is a Rhodesian born American former professional tennis player.

== Biography ==
Born in Bulawayo, Irvine was a student of Prince Edward School in Salisbury and played a variety of sports early in life. He was a world ranked squash player and also represented Rhodesia in field hockey. A school teacher by profession, he played in two Davis Cup ties for Rhodesia, against Sweden in 1968 and Spain in 1969.

While competing on the professional tour in the early 1970s he made several appearances at Wimbledon and the US Open. He was a mixed doubles semi-finalist at the 1970 Wimbledon Championships, partnering Helen Gourlay of Australia. As a singles player he made the Wimbledon third round in 1971 and played a center court match at Wimbledon the following year against top seed and eventual champion Stan Smith. In 1974 he won the singles title at the Rothmans Connaught Hard Court Championships played on clay at Chingford, Essex, England against John Clifton.

Irvine, who became an American citizen, had a noted career in platform tennis after leaving the professional tour and is a member of the sport's hall of fame.

== See also ==
- List of Rhodesia Davis Cup team representatives
