= Juan Herrera (tennis) =

Spanish tennis player (born 1952)

- Country (sports): Spain
- Born: 1952; Murcia, Spain
- Plays: Right-handed (one-handed backhand)

Singles
- Career record: 5–15
- Career titles: 0
- Highest ranking: No. 180 (1 May 1974)

Grand Slam singles results
- Wimbledon: Q3 (1972)
- French Open Junior: W (1970)
- Wimbledon Junior: QF (1970)

Doubles
- Career record: 1–4
- Career titles: 0
- Last updated on: 22 March 2020.

Juan Herrera Gil (born 1952) is a retired tennis player from Spain.

== Tennis career ==
=== Juniors ===
As a junior, he won the French Open Boys' Singles title in 1970. In the final, he defeated Jacques Thamin in three sets.

=== Pro tour ===
As a professional, his best result came in 1971 at the Concurso Internacional de Puerta de Hierro in Madrid, where he won two matches before losing to Ion Țiriac 7–9 4–6 in the third round. The Romanian, a former world No. 8, would go on to win the title.
