= Compton Russell =

Jamaican tennis player

- Country (sports): Jamaica; Caribbean/West Indies
- College: UCLA Bruins

Singles
- Career record: 1–11 (Davis Cup & Grand Prix)

Doubles
- Career record: 0–2 (Davis Cup & Grand Prix)

Compton Russell is a Jamaican former professional tennis player.

Russell, a Wimbledon junior quarter-finalist, played collegiate tennis for the UCLA Bruins. He was a Davis Cup representative for the combined Caribbean team, appearing in 1971, 1972 and 1981.

From a tennis family, Russell is a cousin of tennis player Richard Russell. His brother Greg was an assistant coach at Harvard and another brother Norman played collegiate tennis for Eastern Kentucky University.
