= 1971 Wimbledon Championships – Men's singles =

Men's singles
- 1971 Wimbledon Championships

Final
- Champion: (Australia) John Newcombe
- Runner-up: (United States) Stan Smith
- Score: 6–3, 5–7, 2–6, 6–4, 6–4

Details
- Draw: 128 (12 Q )
- Seeds: 8

Events
Singles	men	women		boys	girls
Doubles	men	women	mixed	boys	girls
← 1970 ·	Wimbledon Championships	· 1972 →

Defending champion John Newcombe defeated Stan Smith in the final, 6–3, 5–7, 2–6, 6–4, 6–4 to win the gentlemen's singles tennis title at the 1971 Wimbledon Championships. It was his third Wimbledon singles title and fourth major singles title overall.

== Seeds ==
1. (Australia) Rod Laver (quarterfinals)
2. (Australia) John Newcombe (champion)
3. (Australia) Ken Rosewall (semifinals)
4. (United States) Stan Smith (final)
5. (United States) Arthur Ashe (third round)
6. (United States) Cliff Richey (quarterfinals)
7. (Romania) Ilie Năstase (second round)
8. (South Africa) Cliff Drysdale (first round)

Click on the seed number of a player to go to their draw section.

== Draw ==
=== Key ===
- Q = Qualifier
- WC = Wild card
- LL = Lucky loser
- Alt = Alternate
- ITF = ITF entry
- PR = Protected ranking
- SR = Special ranking
- SE = Special exempt
- JE = Junior exempt
- JR = Junior Accelerator Programme entrant
- CO = College Accelerator Programme entrant
- NG = Next Gen Accelerator Program entrant
- w/o = Walkover
- r = Retired
- d = Defaulted

=== Finals ===
Quarterfinals
1	(Australia) Rod Laver	7	6	3
(United States) Tom Gorman	9	8	6
4	(United States) Stan Smith	8	6	6
(New Zealand) Onny Parun	6	3	4
6	(United States) Cliff Richey	8	7	4	7	5
3	(Australia) Ken Rosewall	6	5	6	9	7
(Australia) Colin Dibley	1	2	3
2	(Australia) John Newcombe	6	6	6

Semifinals
(United States) Tom Gorman	3	6	2
4	(United States) Stan Smith	6	8	6
3	(Australia) Ken Rosewall	1	1	3
2	(Australia) John Newcombe	6	6	6

Final
4	(United States) Stan Smith	3	7	6	4	4
2	(Australia) John Newcombe	6	5	2	6	6

=== Top half ===
==== Section 1 ====
First round
1	(Australia) Rod Laver	6	6	6
LL	(Australia) Bob Howe	2	0	1
(South Africa) Ray Moore	6	3	8	6	9
(Australia) Allan Stone	1	6	9	4	7
(United States) Clark Graebner	6	6	6
(Australia) Allan McDonald	4	2	2
(Hungary) István Gulyás	2	4	8	2
(Socialist Federal Republic of Yugoslavia) Željko Franulović	6	6	6	6
(Netherlands) Tom Okker	6	6	6
(Czechoslovakia) Jan Kodeš	3	3	3
(United States) Gene Scott	6	6	3	0	3
(Australia) Ray Ruffels	4	4	6	6	6
(Socialist Federal Republic of Yugoslavia) Nikola Pilić	6	9	5	6
(South Africa) Terry Ryan	3	8	7	4
Q	(South Africa) Pat Cramer	9	9	3	2	7
(Greece) Nicholas Kalogeropoulos	8	8	6	6	9

Second round
1	(Australia) R Laver	6	6	6	7
(South Africa) R Moore	8	3	2	5
(United States) C Graebner	6	6	6
(Socialist Federal Republic of Yugoslavia) Ž Franulović	3	1	1
(Netherlands) T Okker	8	6	6	6
(Australia) R Ruffels	9	4	3	4
(Socialist Federal Republic of Yugoslavia) N Pilić	6	6	3	4	6
(Greece) N Kalogeropoulos	2	2	6	6	1

Third round
1	(Australia) R Laver	9	6	7
(United States) C Graebner	8	2	5
(Netherlands) T Okker	3	6	6	8
(Socialist Federal Republic of Yugoslavia) N Pilić	6	3	4	6

Fourth round
1	(Australia) R Laver	7	6	2	7
(Netherlands) T Okker	5	1	6	5

==== Section 2 ====
First round
8	(South Africa) Cliff Drysdale	6	8	3	4	5
(United States) Tom Gorman	2	6	6	6	7
Q	(Italy) Ezio Di Matteo	6	6	8
(United Kingdom) Peter Curtis	4	3	6
(Romania) Ion Țiriac	9	6	6
Q	(India) Anand Amritraj	8	3	1
(New Zealand) Brian Fairlie	8	9	6
(United States) Roy Barth	6	8	4
(Denmark) Jørgen Ulrich	1	6	4	6	6
(Czechoslovakia) Štěpán Koudelka	6	1	6	4	4
(Australia) Ross Case	6	7	7
Q	(New Zealand) Jeff Simpson	4	5	5
(South Africa) Derek Schroder	1	3	6	4
(Rhodesia) Hank Irvine	6	6	3	6
Q	(France) Wanaro N'Godrella	3	8	7
(Australia) Terry Addison	6	9	9

Second round
(United States) T Gorman	2	6	6	6
Q	(Italy) E di Matteo	6	2	2	1
(Romania) I Țiriac	6	6	7	8
(New Zealand) B Fairlie	3	3	9	6
(Denmark) J Ulrich	3	6	7	3	1
(Australia) R Case	6	2	5	6	6
(Rhodesia) H Irvine	6	8	6
(Australia) T Addison	2	6	4

Third round
(United States) T Gorman	6	6	7
(Romania) I Țiriac	4	3	5
(Australia) R Case	6	6	6
(Rhodesia) H Irvine	3	4	3

Fourth round
(United States) T Gorman	6	8	6
(Australia) R Case	3	6	4

==== Section 3 ====
First round
4	(United States) Stan Smith	6	6	6
(France) Michel Leclercq	2	4	3
(Spain) Andrés Gimeno	3	6	4	4
(United Kingdom) John Paish	6	1	6	6
(West Germany) Jürgen Fassbender	4	4	9	9	5
(Sweden) Ove Bengtson	6	6	7	7	7
(Rhodesia) Andrew Pattison	6	6	6
(Japan) Jun Kuki	2	1	0
(United States) Bob Lutz	8	8	4	6	12
(United States) Frank Froehling	6	9	6	2	10
(Romania) Petre Mărmureanu	2	1	2
(United Kingdom) John Clifton	6	6	6
Q	(Australia) Peter Doerner	6	6	3	6
(Japan) Keishiro Yanagi	2	2	6	0
(Australia) Roy Emerson	6	6	6
(Czechoslovakia) Milan Holeček	4	4	4

Second round
4	(United States) S Smith	6	6	6
(United Kingdom) J Paish	1	4	4
(Sweden) O Bengtson	6	6	4	7	3
(Rhodesia) A Pattison	4	4	6	9	6
(United States) R Lutz	6	6	6
(United Kingdom) J Clifton	3	1	4
Q	(Australia) P Doerner	6	2	6	1
(Australia) R Emerson	4	6	8	6

Third round
4	(United States) S Smith	6	6	7
(Rhodesia) A Pattison	3	4	5
(United States) R Lutz	9	3	8	8
(Australia) R Emerson	8	6	9	9

Fourth round
4	(United States) S Smith	2	6	6	9
(Australia) R Emerson	6	1	3	7

==== Section 4 ====
First round
5	(United States) Arthur Ashe	3	6	6	7
(United States) Erik van Dillen	6	3	4	5
(West Germany) Harald Elschenbroich	6	5	3	1
(France) Patrick Proisy	3	7	6	6
(Australia) John Alexander	6	6	6
(Australia) Bill Bowrey	0	2	2
(United States) Marty Riessen	9	6	8
(United States) Jim McManus	8	4	6
(United States) Pancho Gonzales	6	6	6	4	6
(Spain) Manuel Orantes	3	4	8	6	2
(France) Pierre Barthès	6	8	6	9
Q	(West Germany) Karl Meiler	4	9	3	7
(New Zealand) Onny Parun	6	2	6	6
(France) Jean-Loup Rouyer	2	6	2	3
Q	(West Germany) Hans-Joachim Plötz	6	6	7
(Czechoslovakia) František Pála	1	4	5

Second round
5	(United States) A Ashe	6	6	6
(France) P Proisy	4	4	4
(Australia) J Alexander	8	2	3
(United States) M Riessen	9	6	6
(United States) R Gonzales	5	9	6	3	4
(France) P Barthès	7	8	3	6	6
(New Zealand) O Parun	6	6	6
Q	(West Germany) H-J Plötz	0	2	2

Third round
5	(United States) A Ashe	1	8	9	4
(United States) M Riessen	6	9	8	6
(France) P Barthès	2	6	7	1
(New Zealand) O Parun	6	4	9	6

Fourth round
(United States) M Riessen	8	3	6	3
(New Zealand) O Parun	9	6	3	6

=== Bottom half ===
==== Section 5 ====
First round
(France) Daniel Contet	4	6	3	6	3
(South Africa) Bob Maud	6	4	6	2	6
(Czechoslovakia) Jan Kukal	6	3	2	1
(Australia) Frank Sedgman	3	6	6	6
(France) François Jauffret	6	6	3	4	2
(United States) Jeff Borowiak	4	2	6	6	6
(Australia) Barry Phillips-Moore	6	8	8
(United Kingdom) Stanley Matthews	3	6	6
(Australia) Tony Roche	7	6	6	8
(United States) Charlie Pasarell	9	4	8	9
(Italy) Adriano Panatta	6	3	6	6
Q	(United States) Butch Seewagen	3	6	3	4
(Mexico) Marcelo Lara	1	3	4
(United Kingdom) Roger Taylor	6	6	6
(Australia) Dick Crealy	3	7	6	3
6	(United States) Cliff Richey	6	9	2	6

Second round
(South Africa) R Maud	4	7	4	6	4
(Australia) F Sedgman	6	5	6	2	6
(United States) J Borowiak	6	9	8
(Australia) B Phillips-Moore	2	7	6
(United States) C Pasarell	3	3	6	3
(Italy) A Panatta	6	6	3	6
(United Kingdom) R Taylor	2	6	6	4	9
6	(United States) C Richey	6	3	2	6	11

Third round
(Australia) F Sedgman	2	6	3	4
(United States) J Borowiak	6	4	6	6
(Italy) A Panatta	2	2	4
6	(United States) C Richey	6	6	6

Fourth round
(United States) J Borowiak	4	6	4	4
6	(United States) C Richey	6	4	6	6

==== Section 6 ====
First round
(Australia) Fred Stolle	6	3	9	4	6
(Australia) Kim Warwick	4	6	7	6	3
(Hungary) Péter Szőke	5	2	2
(Brazil) Thomaz Koch	7	6	6
(South Africa) Frew McMillan	6	6	6
(Japan) Toshiro Sakai	4	2	1
(Denmark) Jan Leschly	6	3	3	3
(Australia) Owen Davidson	3	6	6	6
Q	(United Kingdom) John de Mendoza	9	3	3	4
(France) Jean-Baptiste Chanfreau	8	6	6	6
(Chile) Jaime Fillol	6	5	4	6	6
(United Arab Republic) Ismail El Shafei	4	7	6	0	2
(Australia) Bob Carmichael
(United States) Jimmy Connors	w/o
(Belgium) Patrick Hombergen	3	3	1
3	(Australia) Ken Rosewall	6	6	6

Second round
(Australia) F Stolle	6	6	6
(Brazil) T Koch	3	4	4
(South Africa) F McMillan	7	6	1	4
(Australia) O Davidson	9	3	6	6
(France) J-B Chanfreau	8	3	8
(Chile) J Fillol	9	6	9
(Australia) R Carmichael	7	6	4	6	2
3	(Australia) K Rosewall	9	2	6	3	6

Third round
(Australia) F Stolle	9	6	6
(Australia) O Davidson	8	1	2
(Chile) J Fillol	3	1	4
3	(Australia) K Rosewall	6	6	6

Fourth round
(Australia) F Stolle	4	5	9	4
3	(Australia) K Rosewall	6	7	7	6

==== Section 7 ====
First round
(Australia) Colin Dibley	7	6	6
(Austria) Hans Kary	5	2	2
(United Kingdom) Graham Stilwell	8	6	1	7
(France) Jean-Claude Barclay	6	0	6	5
(United States) Dennis Ralston	8	6	6
(Denmark) Torben Ulrich	6	3	2
(Australia) Geoff Masters	7	6	6
(Socialist Federal Republic of Yugoslavia) Nikola Špear	5	0	2
(Hungary) Szabolcs Baranyi	6	1	4	2
(Mexico) Joaquín Loyo Mayo	1	6	6	6
(Czechoslovakia) Vladimír Zedník	3	6	2	0
(South Africa) Byron Bertram	6	3	6	6
(Chile) Patricio Cornejo	4	2	4
(France) Georges Goven	6	6	6
(Australia) Ray Keldie	6	1	3	6	8
7	(Romania) Ilie Năstase	1	6	6	4	10

Second round
(Australia) C Dibley	2	6	3	9	6
(United Kingdom) G Stilwell	6	3	6	8	4
(United States) D Ralston	6	6	5	9
(Australia) G Masters	1	4	7	7
(Mexico) J Loyo Mayo	9	6	6
(South Africa) B Bertram	8	3	2
(France) G Goven	6	6	6
7	(Romania) I Năstase	4	4	2

Third round
(Australia) C Dibley	3	8	6	6	10
(United States) D Ralston	6	9	3	0	8
(Mexico) J Loyo Mayo	4	9	6	4	6
(France) G Goven	6	7	4	6	4

Fourth round
(Australia) C Dibley	6	8	6
(Mexico) J Loyo Mayo	3	6	3

==== Section 8 ====
First round
(Australia) Phil Dent	6	5	6	7
(India) Premjit Lall	4	7	4	5
(Soviet Union) Alex Metreveli	6	6	6
(India) Jaidip Mukerjea	2	4	4
(Brazil) José Edison Mandarino	6	8	6	6
(Spain) Antonio Muñoz	4	9	4	2
Q	(United Kingdom) John Feaver	5	2	2
Q	(Czechoslovakia) Jiří Hřebec	7	6	6
(Australia) Syd Ball	6	7	6	1	5
(United States) Allen Fox	2	9	1	6	7
(United Kingdom) Gerald Battrick	2	6	6	6
(Australia) John Bartlett	6	4	3	1
(Australia) Ian Fletcher	8	7	1	6
(United Kingdom) Mark Cox	6	5	6	4
(South Africa) Bob Hewitt	4	3	5
2	(Australia) John Newcombe	6	6	7

Second round
(Australia) P Dent	7	3	4
(Soviet Union) A Metreveli	9	6	6
(Brazil) JE Mandarino	4	4	3
Q	(Czechoslovakia) J Hřebec	6	6	6
(United States) A Fox	4	2	2
(United Kingdom) G Battrick	6	6	6
(Australia) I Fletcher	5	4	2
2	(Australia) J Newcombe	7	6	6

Third round
(Soviet Union) A Metreveli	6	7	6
Q	(Czechoslovakia) J Hřebec	4	5	4
(United Kingdom) G Battrick	4	4	4
2	(Australia) J Newcombe	6	6	6

Fourth round
(Soviet Union) A Metreveli	8	3	6	3
2	(Australia) J Newcombe	9	6	4	6

Preceded by 1971 French Open	Grand Slams; Men's singles	Succeeded by 1971 U.S. Open
