= 1971 Wimbledon Championships =

- Date: 21 June – 3 July
- Edition: 85th
- Category: Grand Slam
- Prize money: £37,790
- Surface: Grass
- Location: Church Road; SW19, Wimbledon, London, United Kingdom
- Venue: All England Lawn Tennis and Croquet Club

Champions

Men's singles
- (Australia) John Newcombe

Women's singles
- (Australia) Evonne Goolagong

Men's doubles
- (Australia) Roy Emerson / (Australia) Rod Laver

Women's doubles
- (United States) Rosie Casals / (United States) Billie Jean King

Mixed doubles
- (Australia) Owen Davidson / (United States) Billie Jean King

Boys' singles
- (United States) Robert Kreiss

Girls' singles
- (Soviet Union) Marina Kroschina
- Wimbledon Championships

The 1971 Wimbledon Championships was a tennis tournament that took place on the outdoor grass courts at the All England Lawn Tennis and Croquet Club in Wimbledon, London, United Kingdom. The tournament was held from Monday 21 June until Saturday 3 July 1971. It was the 85th staging of the Wimbledon Championships, and the third Grand Slam tennis event of 1971. John Newcombe and Evonne Goolagong won the singles titles.

The championships introduced the tie-break system for the first time in 1971, with the break being played when the games reached 8-8 in a set, other than the fifth set for the men's events and the third for the women's and mixed events. The 8-8 tie-break remained in place until the 1979 championships, when it was reduced to 6-6.

== Prize money ==
The total prize money for the 1971 championships was £37,790. The winner of the men's title earned £3,750 while the women's singles champion earned £1,800.

Event	W	F	SF	QF	Round of 16	Round of 32	Round of 64	Round of 128
Men's singles	£3,750	£2,250	£750	£415	£225	£150	£95	£75
Women's singles	£1,800	£1,000	£450	£265	£150	£115	£75	£55
Men's doubles *	£750	£450	£300	£150	£0	£0	£0	—N/a
Women's doubles *	£450	£300	£150	£75	£0	£0	£0	—N/a
Mixed doubles *	£375	£265	£130	£75	£0	£0	£0	£0

_{* per team}

== Champions ==
=== Seniors ===
==== Men's singles ====
(Australia) John Newcombe defeated (United States) Stan Smith, 6–3, 5–7, 2–6, 6–4, 6–4

- It was Newcombe's 4th career Grand Slam title (his 2nd in the Open Era), and his 3rd (and last) Wimbledon title.

==== Women's singles ====
(Australia) Evonne Goolagong defeated (Australia) Margaret Court, 6–4, 6–1

- It was Goolagong's 2nd career Grand Slam title, and her 1st Wimbledon title.

==== Men's doubles ====
(Australia) 'Roy Emerson / (Australia) Rod Laver defeated (United States) Arthur Ashe / (United States) Dennis Ralston, 4–6, 9–7, 6–8, 6–4, 6–4

==== Women's doubles ====
(United States) Rosie Casals / (United States) Billie Jean King defeated (Australia) Margaret Court / (Australia) Evonne Goolagong, 6–3, 6–2

==== Mixed doubles ====
(Australia) Owen Davidson / (United States) Billie Jean King defeated (United States) Marty Riessen / (Australia) Margaret Court, 3–6, 6–2, 15–13

=== Juniors ===
==== Boys' singles ====
(United States) Robert Kreiss defeated (United Kingdom) Stephen Warboys, 2–6, 6–4, 6–3

==== Girls' singles ====
(Soviet Union) Marina Kroschina defeated (Republic of Ireland) Sue Minford, 6–4, 6–4

== Singles seeds ==
=== Men's singles ===
1. (Australia) Rod Laver (quarterfinals, lost to Tom Gorman)
2. (Australia) John Newcombe (champion)
3. (Australia) Ken Rosewall (semifinals, lost to John Newcombe)
4. (United States) Stan Smith (final, lost to John Newcombe)
5. (United States) Arthur Ashe (third round, lost to Marty Riessen)
6. (United States) Cliff Richey (quarterfinals, lost to Ken Rosewall)
7. (Romania) Ilie Năstase (second round, lost to Georges Goven)
8. (South Africa) Cliff Drysdale (first round, lost to Tom Gorman)

=== Women's singles ===
1. (Australia) Margaret Court (final, lost to Evonne Goolagong)
2. (United States) Billie Jean King (semifinals, lost to Evonne Goolagong)
3. (Australia) Evonne Goolagong (champion)
4. (United States) Rosie Casals (second round, lost to Kerry Melville)
5. (United Kingdom) Virginia Wade (fourth round, lost to Judy Dalton)
6. (United States) Nancy Richey (quarterfinals, lost to Evonne Goolagong)
7. (France) Françoise Dürr (quarterfinals, lost to Billie Jean King)
8. (West Germany) Helga Masthoff (third round, lost to Lesley Bowrey)

Preceded by 1971 French Open	Grand Slams	Succeeded by 1971 US Open
