= 1972 US Open (tennis) =

- Date: 28 August – 10 September
- Edition: 92nd
- Category: Grand Slam (ITF)
- Surface: Grass
- Location: Forest Hills, Queens, New York, United States
- Venue: West Side Tennis Club

Champions

Men's singles
- (Romania) Ilie Năstase

Women's singles
- (United States) Billie Jean King

Men's doubles
- (South Africa) Cliff Drysdale / (United Kingdom) Roger Taylor

Women's doubles
- (France) Françoise Dürr / (Netherlands) Betty Stöve

Mixed doubles
- (Australia) Margaret Court / (United States) Marty Riessen
- US Open

The 1972 US Open was a tennis tournament that took place on the outdoor grass courts at the West Side Tennis Club in Forest Hills, Queens, in New York City, New York. The tournament ran from 28 August until 10 September. It was the 92nd staging of the US Open, and the fourth Grand Slam tennis event of 1972. Ilie Năstase and Billie Jean King won the singles titles.

== Finals ==
=== Men's singles ===
(Romania) Ilie Năstase defeated (United States) Arthur Ashe, 3–6, 6–3, 6–7^{(1–5)}, 6–4, 6–3

- This was the first of Nastase's two career Grand Slam titles, and his only US Open title.

=== Women's singles ===
(United States) Billie Jean King defeated (Australia) Kerry Melville, 6–3, 7–5

- This was the ninth of King's twelve career Grand Slam titles, her fifth during the Open Era, and the third of her four US Open titles.

=== Men's doubles ===
(South Africa) Cliff Drysdale / (United Kingdom) Roger Taylor defeated (Australia) Owen Davidson / (Australia) John Newcombe, 6–4, 7–6, 6–3

=== Women's doubles ===
(France) Françoise Dürr / (Netherlands) Betty Stöve defeated (Australia) Margaret Court / (United Kingdom) Virginia Wade, 6–3, 1–6, 6–3

=== Mixed doubles ===
(Australia) Margaret Court / (United States) Marty Riessen defeated (United States) Rosemary Casals / (Romania) Ilie Năstase, 6–3, 7–5

== Top 10 seeds ==
=== Men's singles ===
1.	Stan Smith (USA)	lost to	6 Arthur Ashe (USA)	QF
2.	Ken Rosewall (AUS))	lost to	Mark Cox (GBR)	2nd
3.	Rod Laver (AUS)	lost to	12 Cliff Richey (USA)	R16
4.	Ilie Năstase (ROU)	defeated	6 Arthur Ashe (USA)	W
5.	John Newcombe (AUS)	lost to	Fred Stolle (AUS)	3rd
6.	Arthur Ashe (USA)	lost to	4 Ilie Năstase (ROU)	F
7.	Tom Okker (NED)	lost to	Roscoe Tanner (USA)	3rd
8.	Jan Kodeš (TCH)	lost to	Sandy Mayer (USA)	2nd
9.	Marty Riessen (USA)	lost to	Frew McMillan (RSA)	3rd
10.	Manuel Orantes (ESP))	lost to	John Cooper (AUS)	3rd

Preceded by 1972 Wimbledon Championships	Grand Slams	Succeeded by 1973 Australian Open
