= Robert Kreiss =

American tennis player

- Country (sports): United States
- Born: 30 April 1953 (age 71); Los Angeles, California, United States

Singles
- Career record: 28–64
- Highest ranking: No. 84 (3 June 1974)

Grand Slam singles results
- French Open: 1R (1974, 1975)
- Wimbledon: 1R (1974, 1975)
- US Open: 2R (1974)

Doubles
- Career record: 19–47

Grand Slam doubles results
- French Open: 2R (1974)
- Wimbledon: 1R (1975)
- US Open: 2R (1973)

Robert Irwin 'Bob' Kreiss (born 30 April 1953) is a former American tennis player who won the Wimbledon Boys' Singles tournament in 1971.

== Tennis career ==
Kreiss won the 1971 Wimbledon Boys' Singles title by beating Stephen Warboys in the final. He attended UCLA, where he played tennis for UCLA Bruins and earned All-American honors on three occasions, in 1970, 1972 and 1973.

Kreiss competed internationally and participated at the French Open, the Wimbledon Championship and the US Open. His best result at a Grand Slam tournament was reaching the second round at the 1974 US Open. During the 1974 Grand Prix season, Kreiss managed to reach two quarterfinals, at the U.S. National Indoor Tennis Championships in Salisbury, Maryland and at the Irish Open in Dublin. In 1975 he reached the quarterfinals at the Cincinnati Open.

== Junior Grand Slam titles ==
=== Singles: 1 ===
Result	Year	Championship	Surface	Opponent	Score
Win	1971	Wimbledon	Grass	(United Kingdom) Stephen Warboys	2–6, 6–4, 6–3
