= Sue Minford =

Irish tennis player

- Full name: Susan Minford
- Country (sports): Ireland
- Born: 3 December 1954 (age 70)
- Plays: Right-handed

Singles
- Career titles: 1

Grand Slam singles results
- Wimbledon: 2R (1971)
- US Open: 2R (1972)

Doubles

Grand Slam doubles results
- Wimbledon: 3R (1972)
- US Open: 1R (1972)

Grand Slam mixed doubles results
- Wimbledon: 1R (1972, 1973)
- US Open: 1R (1972)

Susan Minford (born 3 December 1954) is an Irish former professional tennis player. She was active on ILTF World Circuit from 1969 to 1973 and contested four career singles finals, and won one title.

== Career ==
Minford comes from Northern Ireland and was associated with the Windsor club in Belfast. She was particularly successful on clay courts.

Active on tour in the late 1960s early 1970s, she was a Wimbledon junior runner-up and played two years of Federation Cup tennis for Ireland. Her Federation Cup career included a win over West German Katja Ebbinghaus in 1972.

He career highlights include winning the Ulster Hard Court Championships in 1970 against Dorothy Armstrong. She was also a losing finalist at the Framlingham Open in 1969 to Britains Marjorie Love, the Lee-on-Solent Open in 1970 to Uruguayan international Fiorella Bonicelli and the Merseyside Open in 1973 to Australian player Wendy Turnbull.
