= John Clifton (tennis) =

British tennis player

- Country (sports): (United Kingdom) Great Britain
- Residence: Plymouth, England.
- Born: 19 February 1946 (age 80) Leeds, England
- Plays: Right-handed

Singles
- Career record: 5–18
- Career titles: 0
- Highest ranking: No. 243 (3 June 1974)

Grand Slam singles results
- French Open: 1R (1971)
- Wimbledon: 2R (1971)
- US Open: 1R (1971)

Doubles
- Career record: 8–15
- Career titles: 0

Grand Slam doubles results
- Wimbledon: 3R (1973)
- US Open: 1R (1971)

John Clifton (born 19 February 1946) is a British former professional tennis player. He was born in England and grew up in Scotland.

Clifton became the first player to start a match and win a point in the open era of tennis when he played Owen Davidson in the first round of the British Hard Court Championships in Bournemouth played on 22 April 1968. Clifton lost the match in four sets.

With partner John Paish, Clifton was a doubles runner-up at Newport in 1971.

He made the second round of the singles at the 1971 Wimbledon Championships and the third round of the men's doubles at the 1973 Wimbledon Championships (with Stanley Matthews).

Clifton played a tie for the Great Britain Davis Cup team in 1970, against Austria. He took part in singles rubbers against Peter Pokorny and Hans Kary, but was unable to win either.

== Grand Prix career finals ==
=== Doubles: 1 (0–1) ===
Result	W-L	Date	Tournament	Surface	Partner	Opponent	Score
Loss	0–1	Jul 1971	Newport, UK	Grass	(United Kingdom) John Paish	(Australia) Ken Rosewall (United Kingdom) Roger Taylor	5–7, 6–3, 2–6
