= Stephen Warboys =

British tennis player

- Country (sports): United Kingdom
- Born: 25 October 1953 (age 72)
- Retired: 1976
- Plays: Right-handed

Singles
- Highest ranking: No. 73 (23 August 1973)

Grand Slam singles results
- Wimbledon: 2R (1976)
- US Open: 1R (1972)

Doubles

Grand Slam doubles results
- Wimbledon: 3R (1973)

Grand Slam mixed doubles results
- Wimbledon: 3R (1971, 1976)

Stephen Warboys (born 25 October 1953) is a retired right-handed British tennis player. Warboys was a runner up at Junior Wimbledon in 1971.

== Early life ==
Stephen Warboys was the son of Jack and Averil Warboys. His father was a former tennis player who later operated the Warboys Construction Company: Warboys grew up in Chingford, living in a neighbourhood built by his father's company. He attended a local private school until the age of 11, after which he received private tuition at home.

== Junior Grand Slam finals ==
=== Singles: 1 ===
Result	Year	Championship	Surface	Opponent	Score
Loss	1971	Wimbledon	Grass	(United States) Robert Kreiss	6–2, 4–6, 3–6
