= 1968 Australian Championships – Mixed doubles =

Mixed doubles
- 1968 Australian Championships

Final
- Champions: (United States) Billie Jean King (Australia) Dick Crealy
- Runners-up: (Australia) Margaret Court (Australia) Allan Stone
- Score: Walkover

Details
- Draw: 24
- Seeds: 8

Events
Singles	men	women
Doubles	men	women	mixed
- Australian Championships

Lesley Turner and Owen Davidson were the defending champions but only Turner competed that year with Bill Bowrey.

Turner and Bowrey lost in the semifinals to Margaret Court and Allan Stone.

Billie Jean King and Dick Crealy won the final on a walkover against Court and Stone.

== Seeds ==
Champion seeds are indicated in bold text while text in italics indicates the round in which those seeds were eliminated. The top and bottom two seeded teams received byes into the second round.

1. (Australia) Lesley Turner / (Australia) Bill Bowrey (semifinals)
2. (United States) **Billie Jean King** / (Australia) **Dick Crealy (champions)**
3. (Australia) Karen Krantzcke / (Australia) Ray Ruffels (semifinals)
4. (Australia) Margaret Court / (Australia) Allan Stone (final)
5. (Australia) Judy Tegart / (Australia) Terry Addison (quarterfinals)
6. (United States) Kathleen Harter / (Australia) Ray Keldie (first round)
7. (United States) Rosemary Casals / (Australia) Warren Jacques (quarterfinals)
8. (United States) Mary-Ann Eisel / (United Kingdom) Peter Curtis (quarterfinals)

== Draw ==
Key

- Q = Qualifier
- WC = Wild card
- LL = Lucky loser
- Alt = Alternate
- ITF = ITF entry
- PR = Protected ranking
- SR = Special ranking
- SE = Special exempt
- JE = Junior exempt
- JR = Junior Accelerator Programme entrant
- CO = College Accelerator Programme entrant
- NG = Next Gen Accelerator Program entrant
- w/o = Walkover
- r = Retired
- d = Defaulted

=== Final ===
Final
4	(Australia) Margaret Court (Australia) Allan Stone
2	(United States) **Billie Jean King** (Australia) **Dick Crealy**	w/o

=== Top half ===
First round
4	(Australia) **M Court** (Australia) **A Stone**	**6**	**6**
(Australia) H Amos (Canada) M Belkin	3	2
(Indonesia) L Kaligis (Indonesia) G Widjojo
(Australia) **G Sherriff** (Australia) **R Wilson**	w/o
(Australia) D Whitely (Australia) H Ladyman	3	5
(Australia) **K Melville** (Australia) **D Allen**	**6**	**7**
(Netherlands) A Bakker (Australia) R Layton	2	3
5	(Australia) **J Tegart** (Australia) **T Addison**	**6**	**6**

Second round
1	(Australia) **L Turner** (Australia) **W Bowrey**	**6**	4	**6**
(Australia) S Stephen (Australia) R Coulthard	2	**6**	3
(Australia) C Sherriff (Australia) M Guse	2	4
8	(United States) **M A Eisel** (United Kingdom) **P Curtis**	**6**	**6**
4	(Australia) **M Court** (Australia) **A Stone**	**6**	**6**
(Australia) G Sherriff (Australia) R Wilson	4	0
(Australia) K Melville (Australia) D Allen	3	2
5	(Australia) **J Tegart** (Australia) **T Addison**	**6**	**6**

Quarterfinals
1	(Australia) **L Turner** (Australia) **W Bowrey**	3	**6**	**6**
8	(United States) M A Eisel (United Kingdom) P Curtis	**6**	3	1
4	(Australia) **M Court** (Australia) **A Stone**	1	**7**	**6**
5	(Australia) J Tegart (Australia) T Addison	**6**	5	3

Semifinals
1	(Australia) L Turner (Australia) W Bowrey	4	**6**	3
4	(Australia) **M Court** (Australia) **A Stone**	**6**	3	**6**

=== Bottom half ===
First round
6	(United States) K Harter (Australia) R Keldie
(Australia) **H Fraser** (Australia) **J Fraser**	w/o
(Australia) H Gourlay (Australia) G Pollard	5	3
(Mexico) **E Subirats** (Australia) **B Phillips-Moore**	**7**	**6**
(Australia) **K Dening** (United Kingdom) **G Stilwell**	**6**	**6**
(Indonesia) L Liem (Indonesia) S Sugiarto	3	2
(Australia) S Hole (Australia) R Campbell
3	(Australia) **K Krantzcke** (Australia) **R Ruffels**	w/o

Second round
(Australia) H Fraser (Australia) J Fraser
(Mexico) **E Subirats** (Australia) **B Phillips-Moore**	w/o
(Australia) K Dening (United Kingdom) G Stilwell	4	3
3	(Australia) **K Krantzcke** (Australia) **R Ruffels**	**6**	**6**
7	(United States) **R Casals** (Australia) **W Jacques**	w/o
(France) Y Boy (Republic of Ireland) P Mockler
(Netherlands) A Suurbeek (Australia) B Geraghty	1	1
2	(United States) **B J King** (Australia) **D Crealy**	**6**	**6**

Quarterfinals
(Mexico) E Subirats (Australia) B Phillips-Moore
3	(Australia) **K Krantzcke** (Australia) **R Ruffels**	w/o
7	(United States) R Casals (Australia) W Jacques	1	7
2	(United States) **B J King** (Australia) **D Crealy**	**6**	**9**

Semifinals
3	(Australia) K Krantzcke (Australia) R Ruffels	2	7
2	(United States) **B J King** (Australia) **D Crealy**	**6**	**9**
