= 1968 Australian Championships – Men's doubles =

Men's doubles
- 1968 Australian Championships
- 1967 Champions: (Australia) John Newcombe (Australia) Tony Roche

Final
- Champions: (Australia) Dick Crealy (Australia) Allan Stone
- Runners-up: (Australia) Terry Addison (Australia) Ray Keldie
- Score: 10–8, 6–4, 6–3

Details
- Draw: 28
- Seeds: 8

Events
Singles	men	women
Doubles	men	women	mixed
- Australian Championships

John Newcombe and Tony Roche were the defending champions but did not compete that year.

Dick Crealy and Allan Stone won in the final 10–8, 6–4, 6–3 against Terry Addison and Ray Keldie.

== Seeds ==
Champion seeds are indicated in bold text while text in italics indicates the round in which those seeds were eliminated. The top two seeded teams received byes into the second round.

1. (Australia) William Bowrey / (Australia) Ray Ruffels (semifinals)
2. (United Kingdom) Peter Curtis / (United Kingdom) Graham Stilwell (quarterfinals)
3. (Spain) Juan Gisbert Sr. / (Spain) Manuel Orantes (semifinals)
4. (Australia) **Dick Crealy** / (Australia) **Allan Stone (champions)**
5. (Australia) Terry Addison / (Australia) Ray Keldie (final)
6. (Australia) John Fraser / (Australia) Neale Fraser (quarterfinals)
7. (Canada) Mike Belkin / (Australia) Geoff Pollard (second round)
8. (Australia) Will Coghlan / (Australia) Colin Stubs (first round)

== Draw ==
Key

- Q = Qualifier
- WC = Wild card
- LL = Lucky loser
- Alt = Alternate
- ITF = ITF entry
- PR = Protected ranking
- SR = Special ranking
- SE = Special exempt
- JE = Junior exempt
- JR = Junior Accelerator Programme entrant
- CO = College Accelerator Programme entrant
- NG = Next Gen Accelerator Program entrant
- w/o = Walkover
- r = Retired
- d = Defaulted

=== Final ===
Final
4	(Australia) **Dick Crealy** (Australia) **Allan Stone**	**10**	**6**	**6**
5	(Australia) Terry Addison (Australia) Ray Keldie	8	4	3

=== Top half ===
First round
(Japan) **J Kamiwazumi** (Japan) **T Sakai**	**6**	**6**	**6**
(Australia) R Campbell (Australia) G Dunn	1	1	2
(Australia) **P Oatey** (Australia) **B Phillips-Moore**	1	**8**	5	**9**	**6**
8	(Australia) W Coghlan (Australia) C Stubs	**6**	6	**7**	7	2
4	(Australia) **D Crealy** (Australia) **A Stone**	**6**	**9**	**6**
(Australia) D Reid (Australia) W Reid	1	7	4
(Indonesia) S Sugiarto (Indonesia) G Widjojo	**6**	7	4	**6**	6
(Hong Kong) **I Fletcher** (Australia) **D Smith**	4	**9**	**6**	3	**8**
(Australia) **J Blizzard** (Australia) **R Sherriff**	**6**	4	**6**	**6**
(Belgium) C Janssens (Republic of Ireland) P Mockler	3	**6**	3	3
(Australia) R Coulthard (Australia) H Ladyman	7	0	13
6	(Australia) **J Fraser** (Australia) **N Fraser**	**9**	**6**	**15**

Second round
1	(Australia) **W Bowrey** (Australia) **R Ruffels**	**7**	**6**	**6**
(Australia) J Brown (Australia) B Kearney	5	3	2
(Japan) J Kamiwazumi (Japan) T Sakai
(Australia) **P Oatey** (Australia) **B Phillips-Moore**	w/o
4	(Australia) **D Crealy** (Australia) **A Stone**	w/o
(Hong Kong) I Fletcher (Australia) D Smith
(Australia) J Blizzard (Australia) R Sherriff	4	2	2
6	(Australia) **J Fraser** (Australia) **N Fraser**	**6**	**6**	**6**

Quarterfinals
1	(Australia) **W Bowrey** (Australia) **R Ruffels**	**6**	**6**	**10**
(Australia) P Oatey (Australia) B Phillips-Moore	3	3	8
4	(Australia) **D Crealy** (Australia) **A Stone**	**6**	**6**	**6**
6	(Australia) J Fraser (Australia) N Fraser	2	4	1

Semifinals
1	(Australia) W Bowrey (Australia) R Ruffels	4	**7**	5	10
4	(Australia) **D Crealy** (Australia) **A Stone**	**6**	5	**7**	**12**

=== Bottom half ===
First round
7	(Canada) **M Belkin** (Australia) **G Pollard**	3	**6**	**6**	**6**
(Australia) G Hogben (Australia) M Pettman	**6**	3	4	2
(Australia) **R Case** (Australia) **A Gardiner**	**6**	**6**	**6**
(Australia) R Layton (Australia) R Wilson	3	2	4
(Australia) W Jacques (Australia) C Mason	**6**	16	**9**	15	0r
(Australia) **P Avery** (Australia) **M Senior**	4	**18**	7	**17**	2
(Australia) B Geraghty (Australia) G Teagle	4	1	2
3	(Spain) **J Gisbert Sr.** (Spain) **M Orantes**	**6**	**6**	**6**
5	(Australia) **T Addison** (Australia) **R Keldie**	**6**	**6**	**6**
(Australia) R Brent (Australia) M Guse	3	2	3
(Japan) H Ogata (Japan) T Tsujimoto	4	2	4
(Australia) **A Ryan** (Australia) **B Tobin**	**6**	**6**	**6**

Second round
7	(Canada) M Belkin (Australia) G Pollard	5	5	**7**	5
(Australia) **R Case** (Australia) **A Gardiner**	**7**	**7**	5	**7**
(Australia) P Avery (Australia) M Senior	5	4	7
3	(Spain) **J Gisbert Sr.** (Spain) **M Orantes**	**7**	**6**	**9**
5	(Australia) **T Addison** (Australia) **R Keldie**	**6**	**6**	**10**
(Australia) A Ryan (Australia) B Tobin	3	3	8
(Australia) B Connor (Australia) P Richardson	**6**	2	3	2
2	(United Kingdom) **P Curtis** (United Kingdom) **G Stilwell**	3	**6**	**6**	**6**

Quarterfinals
(Australia) R Case (Australia) A Gardiner	6	**7**	**6**	4	3
3	(Spain) **J Gisbert Sr.** (Spain) **M Orantes**	**8**	5	2	**6**	**6**
5	(Australia) **T Addison** (Australia) **R Keldie**	3	**6**	**9**	**13**
2	(United Kingdom) P Curtis (United Kingdom) G Stilwell	**6**	2	7	11

Semifinals
3	(Spain) J Gisbert Sr. (Spain) M Orantes	**6**	3	**6**	8	6
5	(Australia) **T Addison** (Australia) **R Keldie**	3	**6**	3	**10**	**8**
