= ACT Open =

ACT Championships ACT Open

Defunct tennis tournament
- Tour: ILTF Circuit
- Founded: 1929; 96 years ago
- Abolished: 1978; 47 years ago
- Location: Canberra, Australian Capital Territory, Australia
- Venue: Manuka Tennis Courts (1942-69); Canberra Tennis Centre (1970-2008)
- Surface: Hard

The ACT Open formally known as the Australian Capital Territory Open was a combined men's and women's hard court tennis tournament founded in 1929 as the ACT Championships or Australian Capital Territory Championships. The tournament was organised by the Canberra Lawn Tennis Association and first played at the Manuka Tennis Courts, Canberra, Australian Capital Territory, Australia It ran annually until 1968 as part of the ILTF Circuit, then part of the ILTF Independent Tour until 1977 when it was downgraded.

== History ==
The Australian Capital Territory Championships the most important tennis championship held in the Australian Capital Territory, was inaugurated in 1929. However, the finals were not played. In 1930 the first open women's singles event was held along with the first men's singles final. The venue for the tournament for many years was the Canberra Lawn Tennis Association courts in the Manuka area of Canberra. The event was originally played on outdoor hard cement tennis courts.

With the onset of open tennis in 1968 this tournaments status began to decline. In 1969 following the start of the open era it became part of the ILTF Independent Tour (tournaments not aligned to the Grand Prix Circuit or WCT Circuit until 1977. In 1970 the tournament was moved from Manuka to the new Canberra Tennis Centre at Lyneham. In 1978 downgraded to a Satellite tournament. The tournament was not held from 1982 to 1984, and 1999 to 2003. It continued until 2006. Today the men's tournament has survived in one form or another and is known as the Canberra Tennis International, and women's event is known as the ACT Clay Court International.

The tournament was sponsored from 1970 until at least 1980 by Ampol, Patra Foods and W.D. and H.O. Wills.

== Finals ==
=== Men's singles ===
Year	Champion	Runner-up	Score
1930	(Australia) Stanley Gee	(Australia) Roy Ayliffe	6-1, 6-1, 7-9, 6-4
1931	(Australia) Roy Ayliffe	(Australia) Sidney Bell	3-6, 6-0, 8-6
1932	(Australia) A. Murray	(Australia) Sidney Bell	6-4, 7-5
1933	(Australia) Stanley Gee	(Australia) James Nish	7-9, 7-5, 6-3
1934	(Australia) David Chrystal	(Australia) G. Fry	6-2, 4-6, 6-2
1935	(Australia) David Chrystal	(Australia) Reginald Bennett	6-1, 6-2
1936	(Australia) David Chrystal	(Australia) Bill Sidwell	6-2, 6-1
1937	(Australia) Reginald Bennett	(Australia) Sidney Bell	7-5, 6-1
1938	(Australia) David Thompson	(Australia) Fred Bennett	6-1, 6-2
1939	(Australia) Reginald Bennett	(Australia) Jim Bennett	2-6, 6-1, 11-9
1940-45	No competition		
1946	(Australia) Aubrey Brogan	(Australia) Kevin Taylor	6-2, 6-2
1947	(Australia) Reginald Bennett	(Australia) Frank Pryor	6-3, 6-3
1948	(Australia) Kevin Johnstone	(Australia) Max Anderson	6-4, 6-4
1949	(Australia) William Wallace	(Australia) Reginald Bennett	6-2, 8-6
1950	(Australia) William Wallace	(Australia) Roy Felan	6-2, 4-6, 8-6
1951	(Australia) Bill Sidwell	(Australia) William Wallace	6-4, 6-1
1952	(Australia) Don Candy	(Australia) John O'Brien	6-2, 6-2
1953	(Australia) George Worthington	(Australia) Keith Pepper	6-2 6-2
1954	(Australia) Warren Woodcock	(Australia) Graham Regan	6-0, 6-1
1955	(Australia) Roy Emerson	(Australia) Warren Woodcock	6-0, 6-4
1956	(Australia) Barry Phillips-Moore	(Australia) Neil Gibson	6-2, 6-0
1957	(Australia) Warren Woodcock	(Australia) Ken Binns	6-4, 7-5
1958	(Australia) Roy Emerson	(Spain) Andres Gimeno	6-3, 10-8
1959	(Australia) Neale Fraser	(Australia) Bob Hewitt	6-2, 6-2
1960	(Australia) Neale Fraser	(Australia) Bob Hewitt	6-1, 6-4
1961	(Australia) Bob Hewitt	(Australia) John Newcombe	6-0, 1-6, 6-2
1962	(Australia) Geoff Pollard	(Australia) Michael Callaghan	1-6, 6-1, 6-1
1963	(Australia) John Newcombe	(Australia) Fred Stolle	6-3, 6-4
1964	(Australia) Geoff Pollard	(Australia) Dick Crealy	4-6, 6-1, 6-3
1965	(Australia) Bill Bowrey	(Australia) Geoff Pollard	6-4, 5-7, 6-4
1966	(Australia) Doug Kelso	(Australia) Bruce Larkham	6-0, 3-6, 9-7
1967	(Australia) Bruce Larkham	(Australia) Warren Jacques	6-1, 6-1
1968	(Australia) Ray Ruffels	(Australia) Dick Crealy	6-2, 6-2
1969	(Australia) John Alexander	(Australia) Bruce Larkham	6-1, 6-4
1970	(Australia) Bruce Larkham	(Australia) Geoff Pollard	5-7, 6-3, 7-5
1971	(Australia) Bruce Larkham	(Australia) Howard Humphries	6-7, 7-5, 6-2
1972	(Australia) Bruce Larkham	(Australia) Trevor Allan	7-6, 6-2
1973	(Australia) Bruce Larkham	(Australia) Michael Kenny	6-3, 6-3
1974	(Australia) Chris Kachel	(Australia) Michael Kenny	7-6, 6-3
1975	(Australia) Peter Hawking	(Australia) Phil Martin	6-4, 6-2
1976	Abandoned due to rain		
1977	(Australia) Phil Martin	(Australia) Graham Wurtz	7-5, 6-3
1978	(Australia) Pat Serret	(Australia) Brett Edwards	6-3, 2-6, 6-4
1979	(Australia) Eddie Myers	(Australia) Phil Martin	6-4, 6-2
1980	(Australia) Brett Edwards	(Australia) Phil Martin	6-2, 6-4
1981	(Australia) Charlie Fancutt	(Australia) Terry Rocavert	6-4, 6-3
