= Oatey =

Oatey is a surname. Notable people with this surname include:

- Jack Oatey (1920–1994), Australian rules footballer and coach
- Peter Oatey (born 1946), Australian rules footballer and tennis player
- Robert Oatey (1942–2019), Australian rules footballer

== Other uses ==
- Jack Oatey Medal, a football medal in Australia

== See also ==
- Oatley
