= Peter Oatey =

South Australian sportsman (born 1946)

Personal information
- Full name: Peter Edward Oatey
- Born: 22 September 1946 (age 80); Adelaide
- Original team: Kings College
- Position: Rover

Playing career^{1}
Years	Club	Games (Goals)
1965–1972	Norwood	120 (110)
- ^{1} Playing statistics correct to the end of 1972.

Career highlights
- South Australian Football Hall of Fame inductee

Peter E. Oatey (born 22 September 1946) is a former South Australian sportsman who played both Australian rules football and tennis. He appeared in two Australian Championships and played for the Norwood Football Club in the South Australian National Football League (SANFL).

Oatey played 120 SANFL games with Norwood, from 1965 to 1972. Early in his career he was a half forward flanker but he later appeared mostly as a rover. He is the son of Jack Oatey and brother of Robert Oatey, both South Australian Football Hall of Fame inductees.

He partnered Ian Bidmeade in the 1967 Australian Championship doubles but they were eliminated in the opening round, by Americans Jim McManus and Jim Osborne.

In the 1968 Australian Championships he had more success, reaching the quarter-finals of the doubles with his partner Barry Phillips-Moore. They defeated eighth seeds Will Coghlan and Colin Stubs in the opening round, in five sets. In the next round they had a walkover win over the Japanese pair, Jun Kamiwazumi and Toshiro Sakai. Their quarterfinal encounter with the number one seeds, William Bowrey and Ray Ruffels, proved too much and they exited in straight sets.

Oatey also competed in the singles draw and again encountered Will Coghlan in the first round, this time losing in four sets. Had Oatey won he would have met his own doubles partner, Phillips-Moore, in the second round.
