= Christian Janssens =

Belgian tennis player

- Country (sports): Belgium

Grand Slam singles results
- Australian Open: 1R (1968)
- French Open: Q2 (1969)

Grand Slam doubles results
- Australian Open: 1R (1968)
- French Open: 2R (1969)

Christian Janssens is a Belgian former professional tennis player.

Janssens featured in the singles main draw of the 1968 Australian Championships, where he fell in the first round to Geoff Pollard. He competed in the men's doubles at the 1969 French Open and played a second round match against famed Australian players Roy Emerson and Rod Laver.
