= Bilbao International =

Defunct tennis tournament
- Event name: Marlboro Bilbao International (1972)
- Tour: ILTF World Circuit
- Sponsor: Marlboro
- Founded: 1912
- Abolished: 1973
- Editions: 13 (known)
- Location: Getxo; Bilbao; Spain
- Venue: Campo de Jolaseta (1912); Real Club Jolaseta (1946-1973)
- Surface: Cement (1912) / outdoor Clay / outdoor (1946-1973)

The Bilbao International was an ILTF affiliated clay court tennis tournament founded as the Bilbao International Open. Also known as the Trofeo Martin-Balzola from the 1950s onward it was first played at the Campo de Jolaseta, in September 1912 before stopping. In 1946 the event was revived and held annually at the Real Club Jolaseta, Getxo, Bilbao, Spain until 1973 when it was discontinued.

== History ==
In 1903 the Sociedad Campos de Sport de Jolaseta begins operating the land of the Sociedad de Neguri, which had the magnificent social foresight to reserve part of its property for sporting activities. The grounds included two concrete tennis courts among its facilities.

The inaugural Torneo Internacional de Bilbao in September 1912 was held at the Campo de Jolaseta was a rare international event in Northern Spain before World War I, won by Friedrich Wilhelm Rahe. Campos de Sport de Jolaseta existed as an informal venue run on leased land.

Following 1912, international tennis in Spain was halted by World War I, subsequent regional instability, and later the Spanish Civil War (1936–1939) and World War II (1939–1945).

In March, 1933, 35 founding members of the Sociedad Campos de Sport de Jolaseta and formed the Sociedad Deportiva Jolaseta from a sporting and regulatory standpoint. The tennis courts were upgraded to host international championships.

Following the formalization in 1933 and the granting of the royal prefix in 1943 (Real Club Jolaseta), the club organized its first major official international open in August 1946 as a formally constituted club after WWII, this counted as the 2nd edition relative to the pioneer 1912 event played on the same site.

The event ran annually until 1973 when the final edition of the tournament was held in Guecho (Getxo) and was officially named the Trofeo Martín Balzola (often rendered in international references as the Martin Balzola International).

The 1973 tournament was named in honor of Martín Balzola, a prominent Basque industrialist and key benefactor of tennis in the Biscay region, that was won by François Jauffret on August 13, 1973.

== Finals ==
=== Mens singles ===
Included:
(incomplete roll)

Year	Winner	Runner-Up	Score
1912	(German Empire) Friedrich Wilhelm Rahe	(Austria-Hungary) Ludwig von Salm	6–4, 8–6, 6–3
1946	(Spain) Pedro Masip	(Italy) Francesco Romanoni	6–4, 6–4, 6–3
1948	(Spain) Pedro Masip (2)	(Australia) Jack Harper	6–1, 6–4, 6–4
1957	(Australia) Jack Arkinstall	(United Kingdom) Tony Pickard	9–7, 6–3, 6–3
1960	(Spain) Manuel Santana	(Spain) Antonio Martínez Daniel	6–3, 4–6, 6–3, 6–1
1961	(Spain) Manuel Santana (2)	(Australia) Barry Phillips-Moore	6–0, 9–7, 3–6, 6–0
1964	(Spain) Manuel Santana (3)	(South Africa) Cliff Drysdale	4–6, 6–1, 7–5, 8–6
1965	(South Africa) Frew McMillan	(Chile) Jaime Pinto Bravo	7–5, 4–6, 8–6, 6–3
1968	(Australia) Bill Bowrey	(United States) Allen Fox	6–4, 6–3, 6–4
1969	(Spain) Juan Gisbert Sr.	(Czechoslovakia) Štěpán Koudelka	6–3, 6–2, 6–1
1970	(Australia) Geoff Masters	(Spain) Juan Manuel Couder	4–6, 6–2, 8–6, 3–6, 7–5
1972	(Greece) Nicky Kalogeropoulos	(Argentina) Julián Ganzábal	6–4, 7–5, 6–4
1973	(France) François Jauffret	(Australia) Barry Phillips-Moore	7–6, 6–7, 6–3, 6–3

=== Womens singles ===
(incomplete roll)

Year	Winners	Runners-Up	Score
1969	(South Africa) Joan Wilshere	(Spain) Elisa Gisbert	6–0, 9–7
1970	(Australia) Sue Alexander	(Australia) Sandra Walsham	8–6, 6–2

=== Mixed doubles ===
(incomplete roll)

Year	Winners	Runners-Up	Score
1957	(United Kingdom) Pat Ward (United Kingdom) Billy Knight	(Argentina) María Weiss (United Kingdom) Tony Pickard	6–4, 6–1
1969	(South Africa) Joan Wilshere (Bolivia) Eduardo Gorostiaga	(Spain) Elisa Gisbert (Spain) Jorge Gisbert	6–2, 6–2
