= 1968 Australian Championships – Men's singles =

Men's singles
- 1968 Australian Championships

Final
- Champion: (Australia) Bill Bowrey
- Runner-up: (Spain) Juan Gisbert Sr.
- Score: 7–5, 2–6, 9–7, 6–4

Details
- Draw: 62

Events
Singles	men	women
Doubles	men	women	mixed
- Australian Championships

First-seeded Bill Bowrey won in the final 7–5, 2–6, 9–7, 6–4 against Juan Gisbert Sr. to win the men's singles tennis title at the 1968 Australian Championships. Roy Emerson was the defending champion but did not compete that year.

This was the last Australian Open to be played exclusively by amateur players. The following year, the Australian Open would enter the Open Era and offer prize money to its competitors, whether amateurs or professionals.

== Seeds ==
A champion seed is indicated in bold text while text in italics indicates the round in which that seed was eliminated. The joint first seeds received a bye to the second round.

1. (Australia) **Bill Bowrey (champion)** / (Spain) Juan Gisbert Sr. (final)
2. n/a
3. (Australia) Ray Ruffels (semifinals) / (Spain) Manuel Orantes (quarterfinals)
4. n/a
5. (United Kingdom) Graham Stilwell (second round) / (Australia) Barry Phillips-Moore (semifinals)
6. n/a
7. (Australia) Dick Crealy (quarterfinals) / (Canada) Mike Belkin (quarterfinals)
8. n/a
9. (United Kingdom) Peter Curtis (first round) / (Australia) Allan Stone (third round)
10. n/a
11. (Indonesia) Sutarjo Sugiarto (second round) / n/a
12. n/a
13. (Australia) Phil Dent (quarterfinals) / (Indonesia) Gondo Widjojo (first round)
14. n/a
15. (Australia) Ray Keldie (third round) / (Japan) Jun Kamiwazumi (second round)
16. n/a

== Draw ==
Key

- Q = Qualifier
- WC = Wild card
- LL = Lucky loser
- Alt = Alternate
- ITF = ITF entry
- PR = Protected ranking
- SR = Special ranking
- SE = Special exempt
- JE = Junior exempt
- JR = Junior Accelerator Programme entrant
- CO = College Accelerator Programme entrant
- NG = Next Gen Accelerator Program entrant
- w/o = Walkover
- r = Retired
- d = Defaulted

=== Finals ===
Quarterfinals
1	(Australia) **Bill Bowrey**	**16**	**6**	**6**
7	(Canada) Mike Belkin	14	3	3
3	(Spain) Manuel Orantes	1	**6**	3	**6**	1
5	(Australia) **Barry Phillips-Moore**	**6**	4	**6**	4	**6**
13	(Australia) Phil Dent	**6**	2	1	**6**	0
3	(Australia) **Ray Ruffels**	1	**6**	**6**	3	**6**
7	(Australia) Dick Crealy	8	**6**	2	3
1	(Spain) **Juan Gisbert Sr.**	**10**	3	**6**	**6**

Semifinals
1	(Australia) **Bill Bowrey**	**10**	**6**	**7**
5	(Australia) Barry Phillips-Moore	8	4	5
3	(Australia) Ray Ruffels	8	**6**	2	2
1	(Spain) **Juan Gisbert Sr.**	**10**	3	**6**	**6**

Final
1	(Australia) **Bill Bowrey**	**7**	2	**9**	**6**
1	(Spain) Juan Gisbert Sr.	5	**6**	7	4

=== Main draw ===
==== Section 1 ====
First round
(Australia) **R Coulthard**	**12**	**7**	4	**7**
(Australia) M Senior	10	5	**6**	5
(Australia) E McCabe	3	2	4
(Australia) **J Brown**	**6**	**6**	**6**
(Australia) **R Case**	**6**	3	**6**	**7**
13	(Poland) G Widjojo	4	**6**	3	5
9	(Australia) **A Stone**	**6**	**6**	**6**
(Australia) R Layton	4	2	1
(Australia) B Kearney	4	1	5
(Australia) **W Jacques**	**6**	**6**	**7**
(Australia) M Pettman	4	1	2
(Japan) **T Tsujimoto**	**6**	**6**	**6**
(Australia) M Marchment	2	**6**	4	7
7	(Canada) **M Belkin**	**6**	3	**6**	**9**

Second round
1	(Australia) **B Bowrey**	**6**	**6**	**8**
(Australia) R Coulthard	4	0	6
(Australia) J Brown	**6**	**8**	3	5	0^{r}
(Australia) **R Case**	4	6	**6**	**7**	1
9	(Australia) **A Stone**	**8**	4	**6**	**6**
(Australia) W Jacques	6	**6**	2	3
(Australia) M Pettman	1	3	2
7	(Canada) **M Belkin**	**6**	**6**	**6**

Third round
1	(Australia) **B Bowrey**	w/o
(Australia) R Case
9	(Australia) A Stone	8	**6**	3	4
7	(Canada) **M Belkin**	**10**	1	**6**	**6**

Quarterfinals
1	(Australia) **B Bowrey**	**16**	**6**	**6**
7	(Canada) M Belkin	14	3	3

==== Section 2 ====
First round
3	(Spain) **M Orantes**	**6**	**6**	**6**
(Australia) L Weatherhog	4	0	2
(Australia) **M Guse**	**6**	**6**	**6**
(Australia) J May	1	2	2
(Australia) **N Fraser**	**6**	**6**	**6**
(Australia) R Harvey	1	1	0
(Australia) H Nielson	2	5	4
LL	(Australia) **B Lloyd**	**6**	**7**	**6**
15	(Japan) **J Kamiwazumi**	**8**	**6**	**6**
(Australia) B Connor	6	4	2
(Australia) **G Pollard**	**6**	**6**	**6**
(Belgium) C Janssens	4	2	4
(Australia) **W Coghlan**	**6**	**6**	9	**6**
(Australia) P Oatey	0	2	**11**	3
(Australia) T Dawson	3	0	3
5	(Australia) **B Phillips-Moore**	**6**	**6**	**6**

Second round
3	(Spain) **M Orantes**	**6**	**7**	**6**
(Australia) M Guse	2	5	4
(Australia) **N Fraser**	**6**	3	**8**	4	**6**
LL	(Australia) B Lloyd	4	**6**	6	**6**	3
15	(Japan) J Kamiwazumi	2	2	1
(Australia) **G Pollard**	**6**	**6**	**6**
(Australia) W Coghlan	2	4	**6**	**7**	2^{r}
5	(Australia) **B Phillips-Moore**	**6**	**6**	3	5	**4**

Third round
3	(Spain) **M Orantes**	4	4	**6**	**6**	**6**
(Australia) N Fraser	**6**	**6**	3	4	4
(Australia) G Pollard	4	4	**6**	3
5	(Australia) **B Phillips-Moore**	**6**	**6**	3	**6**

Quarterfinals
3	(Spain) M Orantes	1	**6**	3	**6**	1
5	(Australia) **B Phillips-Moore**	**6**	4	**6**	4	**6**

==== Section 3 ====
First round
5	(United Kingdom) **G Stilwell**	**6**	**6**	**6**
(Australia) G Hogben	2	3	1
(Australia) **J Fraser**	**11**	**6**	**6**
(Australia) N Higgins	9	4	4
(Australia) B Giltinan	6	**6**	4	**6**	2
(Australia) **C Stubs**	**8**	2	**6**	4	**6**
(Australia) H Ladyman	1	1	3
13	(Australia) **P Dent**	**6**	**6**	**6**
11	(Indonesia) **S Sugiarto**	**6**	1	**6**	**6**
(Australia) R Campbell	1	**6**	3	2
(Australia) **R Wilson**	**6**	**6**	**8**
(Australia) G Teagle	0	1	6
(Australia) J James	**7**	5	**6**	3	4
(Australia) **D Smith**	5	**7**	4	**6**	**6**
(Australia) R Sellick	1	1	0
3	(Australia) **R Ruffels**	**6**	**6**	**6**

Second round
5	(United Kingdom) G Stilwell	3	6	**7**	**6**	2
(Australia) **J Fraser**	**6**	**8**	5	4	**6**
(Australia) C Stubs	10	**6**	**6**	4	4
13	(Australia) **P Dent**	**12**	4	2	**6**	**6**
11	(Indonesia) S Sugiarto	1	8	2
(Australia) **R Wilson**	**6**	**10**	**6**
(Australia) D Smith	3	3	0	r
3	(Australia) **R Ruffels**	**6**	**6**	3

Third round
(Australia) J Fraser	15	**6**	1	4
13	(Australia) **P Dent**	**17**	3	**6**	**6**
(Australia) R Wilson	2	2	1
3	(Australia) **R Ruffels**	**6**	**6**	**6**

Quarterfinals
13	(Australia) P Dent	**6**	2	1	**6**	0
3	(Australia) **R Ruffels**	1	**6**	**6**	3	**6**

==== Section 4 ====
First round
7	(Australia) **D Crealy**	**6**	**6**	**6**
(Australia) O Worley	4	1	2
(Hong Kong) **I Fletcher**	**6**	**6**	**6**
(Australia) S Ball	3	4	2
(Australia) **T Addison**	**6**	**6**	**6**
(Republic of Ireland) P Mockler	1	1	0
(Japan) **T Sakai**	2	4	**6**	**7**	**6**
9	(United Kingdom) P Curtis	**6**	**6**	4	5	1
15	(Australia) **R Keldie**	**6**	**6**	**6**
(Australia) J Blizzard	3	3	3
(Australia) **B Geraghty**	**6**	**6**	**6**
(Australia) A Hammond	2	3	3
(Australia) **R Brent**	**6**	**6**	**6**
(Australia) G Dunn	1	0	0

Second round
7	(Australia) **D Crealy**	**6**	**6**	**6**
(Hong Kong) I Fletcher	4	4	4
(Australia) **T Addison**	**6**	**6**	**6**
(Japan) T Sakai	0	4	3
15	(Australia) **R Keldie**	4	5	**6**	**9**	**6**
(Australia) B Geraghty	**6**	**7**	3	7	0
(Australia) R Brent	4	**7**	4	**6**	4
1	(Spain) **J Gisbert Sr.**	**6**	5	**6**	4	**6**

Third round
7	(Australia) **D Crealy**	**9**	**6**	5	**6**
(Australia) T Addison	7	4	**7**	1
15	(Australia) R Keldie	**6**	5	2	3
1	(Spain) **J Gisbert Sr.**	3	**7**	**6**	**6**

Quarterfinals
7	(Australia) D Crealy	8	**6**	2	3
1	(Spain) **J Gisbert Sr.**	**10**	3	**6**	**6**

Preceded by 1967 U.S. National Championships	Grand Slam men's singles	Succeeded by 1968 French Open
