= Mike Belkin =

Canadian tennis player (born 1945)

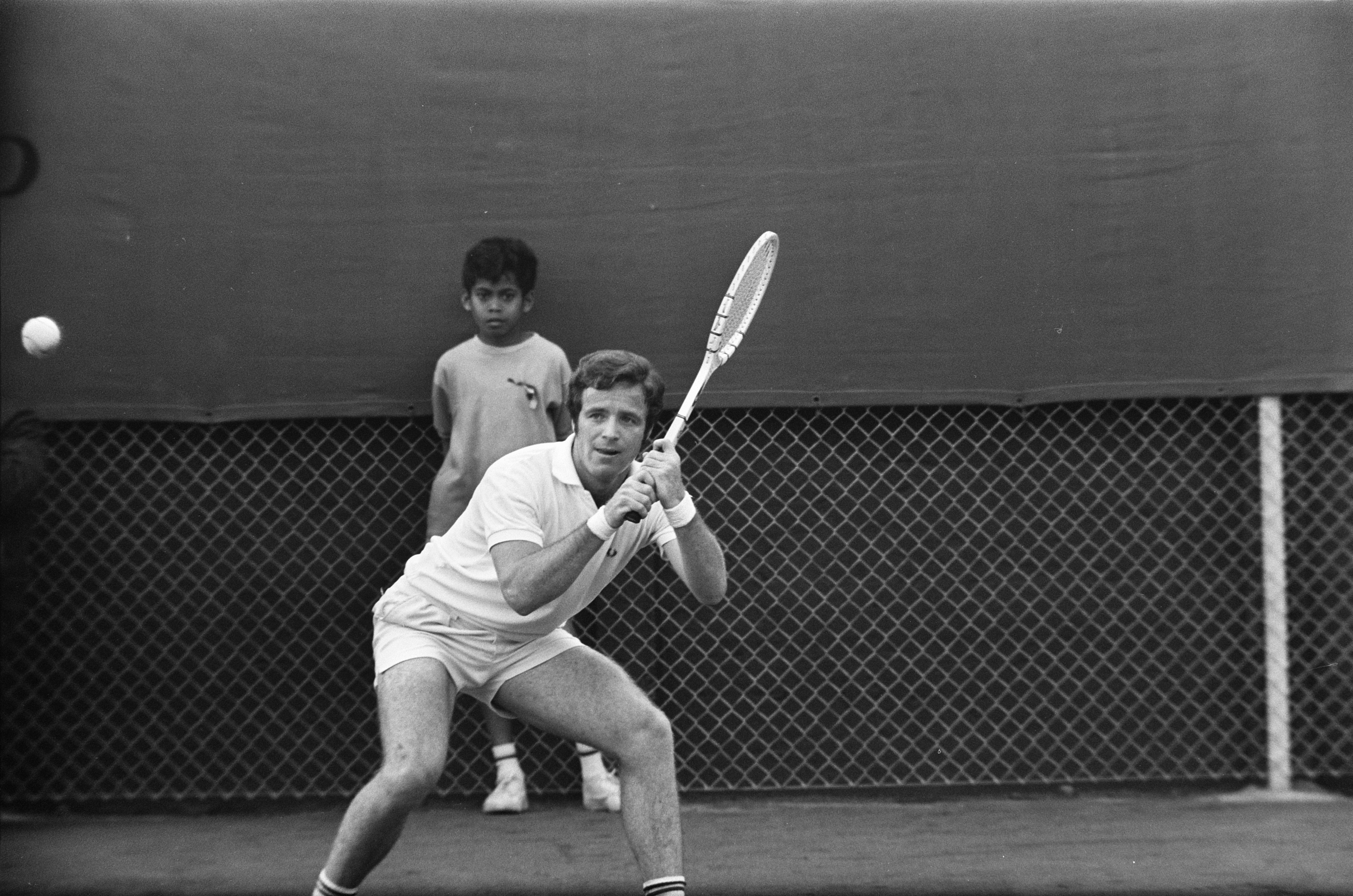
- Full name: Michael I. Belkin
- Country (sports): Canada
- Born: 29 June 1945 (age 80) Montreal, Canada
- Turned pro: 1969 (amateur tour from 1961)
- Retired: 1975
- Plays: Right-handed (two-handed backhand)

Singles
- Career record: 283-157
- Career titles: 17

Grand Slam singles results
- Australian Open: QF (1968)
- French Open: 1R (1966, 1969)
- Wimbledon: 3R (1964)
- US Open: 2R (1964, 1969)

Doubles

Grand Slam doubles results
- Australian Open: 2R (1968)

Michael I. Belkin (born June 29, 1945) is a former Canadian No. 1 tennis player.

Canada's top-ranked player five times between 1966 and 1972, Belkin had a career 17–12 Davis Cup record, including a 14–7 record in singles.

The right-handed Belkin attained a career-high singles ranking of no. 7 world amateur during the early 1960s. He joined the fledgling professional tour in the later half of his playing career, compiling a 36–36 career singles win–loss record. He reached the quarter-finals at the 1968 Australian Championships, which he lost to top seed William Bowrey. He also reached the third round in singles in his inaugural Wimbledon.

Belkin won ILTF tournaments at the Western Championships at Indianapolis in 1967 and at the St. Petersburg Masters Invitational in 1968 and 1971. He won the Detroit Invitation in 1965 and 1967 and the Buffalo Indoor in 1973.

Belkin's other results included semi-finals appearances in 1969 at both the Cincinnati Masters event and Canadian Open.

== Youth, junior, and college tennis ==
Belkin was one of Canada's early tennis phenoms, with his parents moving to Miami Beach when he was 12 for the sake of his tennis. He won the United States National Boys' (15 and under) singles championship, and won the prestigious Orange Bowl boys and junior (18 and under) singles titles, coincidentally played in Miami Beach, in 1960 and 1961 respectively.

While still a student at Miami Beach Senior High School, the right-handed Belkin was Florida men's champion. He was also U.S. National Junior Champion (18 and under) champion, according to a March 1963 Sports Illustrated article. Belkin was an excellent clay court player without any tournament experience on grass. His game was built around a baseline game with both a solid forehand and two-handed backhand. At that time, the 17-year-old Belkin was 3 months into revising his game to include serve and volley technique.

Belkin was a top-ranking collegiate player attending the University of Miami. He reached the finals of the 1965 NCAA individual championships where he lost to Arthur Ashe.

== Senior amateur tennis ==
=== 1961 ===
As a 16-year-old, Belkin lost to Briton Roger Taylor in straight sets in the opening round of the 1961 U.S. Championships. He again lost in the first round at the 1962 U.S. Championship, this time in five sets, to American James Farrin. And the year after, for a third consecutive time, Belkin lost in the first round of the same tournament, this time in straight sets to Norman Perry.

=== 1962 ===
At the U.S. Clay Court Championships in 1962, Belkin defeated U.S. No. 1 Whitney Reed in the first round and Bob Perry in the second round before losing to Billy Lenoir in the third round.

Belkin won the Blue and Gray Invitation in Montgomery, Alabama at the Montgomery Country Club in June 1962, defeating Norman Perry in a close final.

In November 1962 Belkin, at age 17, won the Florida State Tennis Championship, defeating US No. 1 Frank Froehling in the semifinal and Gardnar Mulloy in the final. This would be his first tournament win against a strong field.

=== 1964 ===
In 1964, Belkin played at the Wimbledon Championship for the first time, and fared well given his lack of experience on grass. He defeated Claude De Gronckel in the first round, and Cliff Drysdale in the second, both in four sets, before falling to Bob Hewitt in the third, in straight sets. At the 1964 U.S. Championships later that summer, Belkin defeated Rodney Susman in the first round before falling to Cliff Richey in the second in five sets.

=== 1965 ===
In April 1965, Belkin defeated Richey on clay in the semifinal of the ILTF St. Petersburg Masters Invitational in three straight sets but lost the final to Ramanathan Krishnan in four sets.

Belkin won the Detroit Invitation, a strong field tournament, in early July 1965, defeating the USTA No. 3 Arthur Ashe in the quarterfinal, Dick Savitt in the semifinal, and the USTA No. 2 Chuck McKinley in the final.

=== 1966 ===
Having not competed in singles in any main draws of grand slam tournaments in 1965, Belkin played in two in 1966. At Roland Garros he lost in the first round, to Pancho Guzmán in four sets. At Wimbledon, Belkin reached the second round. He defeated Australian Jim Moore in straight sets before falling to that year's eventual champion, Manuel Santana.

In July 1966 Belkin won the Quebec Open, defeating seven-time winner of the event Robert Bédard in the marathon five-set final. "Bédard started strongly but the toil of the three-and-a-half hour final began to show in the final set when cramps completely immobilized him". In 1967 he again did not compete in a grand slam event.

=== 1967 ===
In early July 1967, Belkin won the Detroit Invitation tournament for the second time, defeating Ron Holmberg in the semifinal and Chuck McKinley in the final.

Belkin won the ILTF Western Championships in Indianapolis on clay in July 1967, defeating twice-defending champion and USTA No. 3 Cliff Richey in the semifinal and Guzman in the final.

Belkin also defeated Richey in the quarterfinal of the U.S. Men's Clay Court Championships in Milwaukee, but lost to Marty Riessen in the semifinal.

=== 1968 ===
At the 1968 Australian Championships, in addition to reaching the quarterfinals in singles, a run which saw victories over M. Marchment, Max Pettman, and Allan Stone before his loss to the eventual champion Bill Bowrey, Belkin reached the second round in doubles, partnering Geoff Pollard.

Belkin won the 1968 ILTF St. Petersburg Masters Invitational on clay in April, defeating Mike Sangster in the quarterfinal, Bowrey in the semifinal, and Jaime Fillol in the final.

== Professional tour tennis ==
=== 1969 ===
Belkin played the 1969 French Open, but was forced to abandon his match against Georges Goven despite leading by two sets. He and partner Pancho Guzmán withdrew from their first round doubles match.

In the summer, Belkin played the Cincinnati Championships, defeating Phil Dent and Stan Smith in the later rounds to reach the semi-finals. In doubles, he and partner Luis Ayala lost in the second round, to Arthur Ashe and Charlie Pasarell.

The following week Belkin played U.S. Clay Court Championships, reaching the quarters in both singles and doubles. In singles he defeated Franklin Robbins, Goven, and Jim Osborne before falling to Ashe in three sets. In doubles he played with Bob Carmichael.

Two weeks later, Belkin played the Canadian Open, reaching the semis in singles, where he lost a four-setter to the eventual champion Richey and the quarters in doubles, partnering compatriot Vic Rollins. Later in August, at the second ever U.S. Open, Belkin lost to Marty Riessen in the second round in singles, and the first round in doubles, partnering Frank Tutvin.

=== 1970 ===
Belkin played the main draw of only four professional circuit events in 1970, Cincinnati, the U.S. Clay Court Championships, Canadian Open, and U.S. Open, playing doubles in only the latter two events.

At Cincinnati, Belkin was soundly beaten by Jeff Borowiak in the first round. The following week in Indianapolis, he defeated Jean-Baptiste Chanfreau and G. Turner Howard before losing in three sets to Croat Željko Franulović.

In Toronto, Belkin had a bye into the second round where he lost handily to Andrés Gimeno. At Forest Hills, he also lost his first match in straight sets, in the first round to Frenchman player Pierre Barthès. In doubles at both tournaments, Belkin and partner John Sharpe lost in the first round.

=== 1971 ===
More active on the tour in 1971, Belkin competed in main draws in a total of 11 events, all Pepsi-Cola Grand Prix events but one, but not in any grand slam tournaments. In mid-February he played the New York Grand Prix, losing in the first round in singles, to Manuel Orantes and doubles, partnering Richard Russell. The following week he competed in the Salisbury Grand Prix (in Salisbury, Maryland), and again lost handily in the first round in singles to Joaquín Loyo-Mayo. In doubles, he and partner Tom Edlefsen reached the second round.

The following week, Belkin played the Macon Outdoor and did even better. Having a first round bye, he beat Jan Kodeš before falling to Tom Gorman. In doubles, he and partner Nikola Špear won two matches to reach the quarter-finals, where they lost to Kodeš and Željko Franulović. The following week at the Hampton Grand Prix, Belkin lost in the first round in both singles and doubles, falling in singles to Ion Țiriac and in doubles partnering Edlefsen for a second time.

In April, Belkin won the ILTF St. Petersburg Masters Invitational on clay for a second time, defeating Harald Elschenbroich in the final.

Belkin reached the semi-finals of the Houston Outdoor, losing in five sets in that round to Clark Graebner. His next action was in July, at the Washington Star International, a WCT event. He scored easy wins over Roscoe Tanner and Patricio Cornejo before losing to Andrés Gimeno. In doubles, Belkin and Richard Russell reached the second round. The following week in singles, Belkin reached the semi-finals of the Tanglewood Grand Prix, losing to Franulovic. In the quarters he defeated rookie tour player Jimmy Connors.

One week later Belkin reached the third round of the Cincinnati Outdoor, beating Rudy Hernando and Brian Gottfried before succumbing to Jaime Fillol. In doubles, he again partnered Russell and the tandem reached the second round. The following week Belkin competed at the Canadian Open, losing in the first round in singles to Ray Ruffels, and in doubles partnering once again John Sharpe. he week after he lost to Ruffels again in Canada, and nearly by the identical score, at the Toronto WCT event. Belkin played one final time in 1971, singles at the Sacramento Outdoor, losing again in the first round, this time to Raymond Moore by default.

=== 1972 ===
Belkin played four American winter indoor events. In early February, he lost handily in singles in the first round in Omaha and Kansas City in consecutive weeks, both times to Ilie Năstase. At the later tournament he also played doubles, with he and partner Tom Edlefsen losing in the second round. Two weeks later, Belkin reached the second round in singles in Salisbury, defeating Milan Holeček before falling to Roscoe Tanner. In doubles, he and partner Hans Kary lost in the first round. The following week at the New York Indoor, Belkin lost in the first round to Alejandro Olmedo.

Belkin saw his next main draw action in August. At the Tanglewood Grand Prix, he lost to Dick Stockton. The following week at the U.S. Clay Court Championships, on Belkin's strongest surface, clay, he beat Jun Kuki and Adriano Panatta before falling to Bob Hewitt in the round of 16. The following week in Montreal he lost however in the first round, to Onny Parun. In doubles he and partner Eddie Dibbs reached the quarter-finals, losing there to the famous doubles team of Hewitt and Frew McMillan. Two weeks later at the U.S. Open, Belkin was level with Cliff Drysdale in the first set 5 games when he retired from the match. Belkin was entered one more main draw, in mid-September, the Montreal WCT, but withdraw from his first round match in both singles and doubles (partnering compatriot Richard Legendre).

=== 1973 ===
Belkin opened 1973 playing four indoor events in the U.S., winning one of them. He lost in the first round to Herb Fitzgibbon in singles and in doubles partnering Nicholas Kalogeropoulos at the Baltimore Indoor in early January. Two weeks later at the Birmingham Indoor, Belkin reached the second round in singles, beating Szabolcs Baranyi before losing to Jürgen Fassbender. In doubles, he and partner Gavorielle Marcu lost in the first round. The following week, Belkin lost in the first round at the Omaha Indoor to Baranyi.

Belkin won the 1973 Buffalo Indoor Tennis Championships in February, defeating Clark Graebner, a four-time champion at the event, in the semifinal and John Paish in the close final.

The final events Belkin played this year were ones held in Canada. In middle February, at the Calgary Indoor, Belkin defeated Hans Kary in three sets before falling to Paul Gerken. In doubles he and partner Pat Cramer lost in the opening round. In August at the Canadian Open, Belkin beat Adriano Panatta in the first round and lost to Iván Molina in the second. In October, Belkin appeared at the Quebec Grand Prix, losing in the first round to Haroon Rahim. In doubles, he and partner, veteran Quebecer Robert Bédard, lost in the first round to Onny Parun and Raymond Moore.

Belkin entered the first computer rankings, on September 13 at No. 145. Two weeks later, with the next rankings released, he stood at No. 128, his career high. In the final rankings released for the year, on December 14, Belkin was No. 161.

=== 1974, 1975 ===
Belkin played one event in 1974, the U.S. Pro Tennis Championships, where he lost in the first round to Guillermo Vilas 2–6, 2–6. On December 12, his singles ranking stood at World No. 318.

In 1975, Belkin competed in two events, also only in singles, both in Florida, his home state. These would be his last tour events to appear in. In early February, he lost in the first round to Jeff Borowiak at the St. Petersburg WCT. Two weeks later at the Boca Raton Grand Prix he completed his touring career with his best result in years, reaching the quarter-finals. He defeated Rolf Thung and Jan Kodeš before losing to Jürgen Fassbender. This saw his next ranking on March 5 rise to World No. 208. His final ranking, released on December 15 saw him rated at No. 222.

== Davis Cup ==
Belkin first played Davis Cup for Canada in 1966 in two ties as Canada advanced to the Europe Group quarterfinals. Against Finland in the first round, Belkin won the second rubber over Rauno Suominen. He also won a dead rubber as Canada defeated the Finns 4–1. In the next round however, Canada went up a strong French team at Roland Garros stadium. Belkin lost the opening rubber to François Jauffret. Belkin also lost the final, dead, rubber in 5 sets to Pierre Darmon as Canada was swept 0–5.

The following year Belkin defeated Mike Sangster in the opening rubber against Great Britain in Europe Group first round action, played in Bournemouth on clay. Britain won the next four rubbers however, including the doubles 12–10 in the fifth, with Roger Taylor and Bobby Wilson overcoming Belkin and Keith Carpenter. In the doubles match, Belkin and Carpenter won the first two sets and led 5–2 in the third set before missing a winning volley and giving the British team a chance to recover.

In 1968, Canada again fell at the first hurdle, losing the first round of North and Central America Semifinal action against Mexico. Played in Mexico City on clay, Mexico swept Canada 5–0. Belkin lost the second rubber to Joaquín Loyo-Mayo. He again partnered Carpenter in the doubles, a match lost in straight sets.

The following year Canada defeated the Netherlands 3–2 in the first round of Europe Group, with Belkin winning all 3 rubbers. In a tie played in Scheveningen, first he defeated Niklaus Fleury in the second rubber. He and Harry Fauquier then won the doubles rubber in four sets. Then, in the deciding fifth rubber, Belkin beat Jan Horduk. In the next round, Canada faced the Soviet Union, in Moscow, and lost 1–4. Belkin took the only rubber off the Soviets when he beat Toomas Leius. In a fifth, dead, rubber, Belkin retired down 2 sets to Alex Metreveli.

In 1970, Canada won two ties before succumbing to Brazil in the Americas Inter-Zone final. To reach that final they first beat the Caribbean and then New Zealand in the North and Central American Group. They swept the Caribbean in early June in Winnipeg on clay, with Belkin defeating Lance Lumsden in five sets in the 2nd rubber and teaming with John Sharpe to win the doubles in straight sets. A week later they beat New Zealand 3–2 in at the same venue. Belkin lost the first rubber to Brian Fairlie in straight sets. He then teamed with Sharpe to win the doubles. Belkin then won the deciding rubber over Onny Parun. Against Brazil in São Paulo, Belkin leveled the tie at a win apiece when Belkin beat José Edison Mandarino. He and Sharpe however lost the doubles tie in 5 sets, despite being up 2 sets to 1. Belkin then beat Thomaz Koch in four sets to again level the tie. John Sharpe was trounced by Mandarino in the final however.

In 1971, Canada lost its only tie of the year, 2–3 to Mexico in Mexico City. Belkin won the second rubber over Loyo-Mayo in four sets, to level the tie. He and Sharpe lost the doubles, however, in four sets, to give the Mexicans the lead. Belkin won the fourth rubber over Marcelo Lara to, again, level the tie at 2-2. In the decider, Sharpe, facing Loyo-Mayo, won the first set but proceeded to lose the next three to lose. The following year saw the same foe and exactly the same result, a 2–3 loss, this time at a tie held in Vancouver (at Jericho Tennis Club). Belkin again beat Loyo-Mayo, this time in rubber 1 and in five sets. Canada again lost the doubles rubber, as Belkin and Dale Power lost in four sets. Loyo-Mayo then defeated Anthony Bardsley in straight sets to give the win to Mexico. Belkin beat Raúl Ramírez in a dead, fifth rubber.

Belkin concluded his Davis Cup career retiring from rubber 1 against Iván Molina of Colombia, having lost the first set 7–9. Canada lost the North and Central America Group preliminary round tie 1–4. Belkin's career Davis Cup win-loss stands at 14 and 7 in singles and 3 and 5 in doubles, with all matches played outdoors on clay.

== Honours ==
Belkin was inducted into the Canadian Tennis Hall of Fame in 1994.

== Post-tour career ==
As of 2006, Belkin was tennis director at the Sonesta Beach Resort on Key Biscayne, Florida.
