= Championship Tennis =

1968 Canadian sports television series

- Genre: Sports
- Presented by: Alex Trebek
- Country of origin: Canada
- Original language: English
- No. of seasons: 1
- No. of episodes: 16

Production
- Producer: Ronald Corey
- Production location: Quebec City

Original release
- Network: CBC Television
- Release: 7 September – 28 December 1968

Championship Tennis is a Canadian sports television series that aired on CBC Television in 1968.

== Premise ==
Episodes consisted of round-robin tennis tournaments among amateur players from six nations. Games were edited and condensed to fit a one-hour time slot.

Colour commentary was provided by Robert Bédard with Bob McDevitt providing other play commentary. Alex Trebek was the series host.

The first episode featured a match between Ramanathan Krishnan (India) and Mike Belkin (Canada). Belkin faced Manuel Santana (Spain) on 19 October. Thomaz Koch (Brazil) and Tom Okker (Netherlands) competed in the 7 December 1968 episode.

== Production ==
The series was recorded in Quebec City at the Civil Employees Tennis Club (club de tennis des employs civils).

== Scheduling ==
This hour-long series was broadcast Saturdays at 1 p.m. from 7 September to 28 December 1968.
