= Perth Indoor Tennis Classic =

Defunct tennis tournament
- Tour: Grand Prix circuit
- Founded: 1975
- Abolished: 1977
- Editions: 3
- Location: Perth, Western Australia, Australia
- Venue: Perth Entertainment Centre
- Surface: Hard / indoor

The Perth Indoor Tennis Classic was a men's tennis tournament played in Perth, Western Australia founded in 1975 as the Hitachi-Datsun Indoor Tennis Classic (for sponsorship reasons).

In 1976 the carmaker Nissan and brand (Datsun) withdrew its sponsorship of the event and the event became known as the Hitachi West Coast Classic until 1977 when it was discontinued. The event was part of the Grand Prix tennis circuit and was usually played at the end of October annually on indoor hard courts at the Perth Entertainment Centre.

== Finals ==
=== Singles ===
Year	Champion	Runner-up	Score
1975	(United States) Harold Solomon	(United States) Sandy Mayer	6–2, 7–6, 7–5
1976	(Australia) Ray Ruffels	(Australia) Phil Dent	6–0, 4–6, 2–6, 6–3, 6–2
1977	(United States) Vitas Gerulaitis	(Australia) Geoff Masters	6–3, 6–4, 6–2

=== Doubles ===
Year	Champions	Runners-up	Score
1975	(United States) Brian Gottfried (Mexico) Raúl Ramírez	(Australia) Ross Case (Australia) Geoff Masters	2–6, 6–4, 6–4, 6–0
1976	(United States) Dick Stockton (United States) Roscoe Tanner	(Australia) Bob Carmichael (Egypt) Ismail El Shafei	6–7, 6–1, 6–2
1977	(Australia) Ray Ruffels (Australia) Allan Stone	(United States) Nick Saviano (United States) John Whitlinger	6–2, 6–1

== Sources ==
- ATP Tour results archive
