= Benson & Hedges Classic =

Defunct tennis tournament
- Tour: Grand Prix circuit
- Founded: 1973
- Abolished: 1974
- Editions: 2
- Location: Christchurch, New Zealand
- Surface: Hard / indoor

The Benson & Hedges Classic is a defunct tennis tournament that was played on the Grand Prix tennis circuit from 1973 to 1974. The event was held in Christchurch, New Zealand at the Cowles Stadium. This had a wood floor overlain with carpet for tennis events. The tournament venue was shifted from Wilding Park to Cowles Stadium during the 1973 tournament due to rain.

== Past finals ==
=== Singles ===
Year	Champions	Runners-up	Score
1973	(Australia) Fred Stolle	(United States) Brian Gottfried	7–6, 6–4, 6–1
1974	(United States) Roscoe Tanner	(Australia) Ray Ruffels	6–4, 6–2

=== Doubles ===
Year	Champions	Runners-up	Score
1973	(India) Anand Amritraj (United States) Fred McNair	(Germany) Jürgen Fassbender (New Zealand) Jeff Simpson	W/O
1974	(Egypt) Ismail El Shafei (United States) Roscoe Tanner	(Australia) Syd Ball (Australia) Ray Ruffels	W/O
