= Oatley =

Oatley may refer to:

== People ==
- Bob Oatley (1928–2016), Australian businessman, winemaker and yachtsman
- Charles Oatley (1904–1996), British electrical engineer
- George Oatley (1863–1950), English architect
- Jacqui Oatley (born 1974), English broadcaster
- James Oatley (c. 1769–1839), Colonial Australian landowner
- Keith Oatley (born 1939), novelist and psychologist
- Kristy Oatley (born 1978), Australian equestrian
- Lyndal Oatley (born 1980), Australian equestrian
- Michael Oatley (born 1935), British intelligence officer
- Neil Oatley (born 1954), British automotive engineer
- Thomas Oatley, Anglican Archdeacon of Lewes, England, c. 1486

== Places in Australia ==
- Oatley, New South Wales, an estuarine suburb of Sydney
  - Oatley railway station
  - Oatley Park, New South Wales, a reserve
  - Oatley Pleasure Grounds, a bush park
- Oatley Bay, on Sydney's Georges River estuary

== See also ==
- Oatly, a Swedish food company
- Oatey
