= Jack Oatey =

Australian rules footballer, born 1920

Jack Oatey AM

Personal information
- Nickname: Caleb
- Born: 29 August 1920; Semaphore, South Australia
- Died: 26 February 1994 (aged 73); Adelaide, South Australia
- Original team: Norwood (SANFL)
- Height: 5 ft 6 in (168 cm)
- Weight: 12 st 8 lb (80 kg)
- Position: Rover

Playing career^{1}
Years	Club	Games (Goals)
1940–43, 1945–52	Norwood (SANFL)	181 (233)
1944	South Melbourne (VFL)	5 (4)
Total		186 (237)

Coaching career
Years	Club	Games (W–L–D)
1945–56	Norwood (SANFL)	229 (148–80–1)
1957–60	West Adelaide (SANFL)	87 (59–28–0)
1962–82	Sturt (SANFL)	470 (314–152–4)
Total		786 (521–260–5)
- ^{1} Playing statistics correct to the end of 1952.

Career highlights
- Club: 4x Norwood Best & Fairest 1940-42, 1945; Norwood-North Adelaide Premiership Player 1943; Norwood Captain 1945-52; 3x Norwood Premiership Captain 1946, 1948, 1950; Coach: 3x Norwood Premiership Coach 1946, 1948, 1950; 7x Sturt Premiership Coach 1966-70, 1974, 1976; Representative: 7 State games for South Australia (Captain: 1949-50); South Australian State Coach 1950, 1959; Honours: Norwood Football Club Life Member; Sturt Football Club Life Member 1971; Order of Australia (AM) for services to the sport of Australian football 1978; SANFL Life Member 1981; Jack Oatey Medal (SANFL Grand Final BoG) named in honour 1981; Only person to coach over 500 wins in elite Australian rules football (521); Norwood Football Club Hall of Fame Member; Norwood Football Club Team of the Century - Rover; Sturt Football Club Hall of Fame Member; Sturt Football Club Team of the Century - Coach; Australian Football Hall of Fame Inaugural Inductee 1996, Legend status 2021; South Australian Football Hall of Fame Inaugural Inductee 2002

Jack Oatey AM (29 August 1920 – 26 February 1994) was an Australian rules football player and coach.

== Playing career ==
Oatey played 181 games for Norwood between 1940 and 1952 and acted as playing-coach from 1945 to 1952.

While on service for World War II in 1944, he played 5 games for South Melbourne.

== Coaching career ==
Following his retirement from playing in 1952, Oatey remained the coach of Norwood until 1956. In 1957, Oatey moved to West Adelaide where he coached until 1960, reaching the finals each year but never winning the premiership. He came closest in 1958, when down by 3 with 90 seconds to go, a set shot hit the post, allowing Port Adelaide to hold on for a 2 point win. Not involved in coaching at any team in 1961, Oatey saw the Bloods win the SANFL premiership, convincing him to return to the league. He went to Sturt, coaching there from 1962 to 1982, and leading the league team to seven SANFL Premierships (a record at the time) including the famous five in a row from 1966 to 1970.

A long-standing coaching rival to Port Adelaide's Fos Williams, Sturt defeated Port Adelaide four times in Grand Finals under Oatey's tutelage.

Through his time at Sturt, Oatey was one of the early instigators of the greater use of handball as an attacking option, which is often apocryphally attributed to the VFL's Ron Barassi, particularly within Victoria. It was a major contributor to Sturt's success through the 1960s. He also encouraged the use of the checkside punt for wide-angle goalkicking, and he was known for encouraging skills development and team play.

He was inducted into the Australian Football Hall of Fame in its inaugural year of 1996. Overall, Oatey coached 37 seasons in the SANFL, winning ten premierships, (Note: three with Norwood, seven with Sturt) reaching seventeen grand finals (Note: six with Norwood, two with West Adelaide and nine with Sturt) and reaching the finals on 33 occasions. His ten premierships is still the record for the most premierships by one coach in elite Australian rules football.

== Accolades ==
Jack Oatey is the only person in elite Australian rules football history to coach over 500 wins. He coached Norwood, West Adelaide and Sturt to a total of 521 wins and five draws from a record 786 matches (Note: 153 of these were as playing coach for Norwood) for an overall success rate of 66.6%. He coached a record ten premierships.

Oatey was awarded Life Membership of the Norwood Football Club, was awarded Life Membership of the Sturt Football Club in 1971 and SANFL Life Membership in 1981.

In 1981 the SANFL inaugurated the Jack Oatey Medal to be awarded to the best player in the SANFL grand final, the first time an SANFL award was named for a still-active coach.

In the 1978 Queen's Birthday Honours, Oatey was appointed Member of the Order of Australia (AM) for services to the sport of Australian football.

Jack Oatey was an inaugural inductee into the Australian Football Hall of Fame in 1996 and was elevated to Legend status in 2021, becoming only the second Legend to have played and coached his entire career in the SANFL. In 2002, he was one of 113 inaugural inductees into the South Australian Football Hall of Fame.

A stand was named after him at the Adelaide Oval in 2014.

Sampson Hosking said of Jack Oatey in 1950 that

I have great respect for him as a coach. He's the best defensive captain I've ever seen.

== Family ==
Oatey's eldest son, Robert Oatey, also played for and coached Norwood and later became a highly respected television commentator for Channel 7 and Channel 10's SANFL coverage in the 1980s, teaming with Bruce McAvaney, Ian Day, Peter Marker and Graham Campbell. Jack's youngest son, Peter, was both a Norwood footballer and tennis player.
