= 1968 Australian Championships – Women's singles =

Women's singles
- 1968 Australian Championships

Final
- Champion: (United States) Billie Jean King
- Runner-up: (Australia) Margaret Court
- Score: 6–1, 6–2

Details
- Draw: 62
- Seeds: 14

Events
Singles	men	women
Doubles	men	women	mixed
- Australian Championships

Billie Jean King defeated Margaret Court in the final, 6–1, 6–2 to win the women's singles tennis title at the 1968 Australian Championships. It was her first Australian Championships singles title. Nancy Richey was the reigning champion, but did not compete that year.

== Seeds ==
The joint first seeds received a bye into the second round.

1. (Australia) Lesley Turner (semifinals)
1. (United States) Billie Jean King (champion)
3. (United States) Rosie Casals (quarterfinals)
3. (Australia) Judy Tegart (semifinals)
5. (Australia) Kerry Melville (third round)
5. (United States) Kathleen Harter (quarterfinals)
7. (United States) Mary-Ann Eisel (third round)
7. (Australia) Margaret Court (final)
9. (Mexico) Elena Subirats (second round)
9. (Australia) Karen Krantzcke (quarterfinals)
11. (Netherlands) Ada Bakker (first round)
11. (Australia) Gail Sherriff (third round)
13. (Australia) Helen Gourlay (first round)
13. (Australia) Lorraine Robinson (withdrew)

Click on the seed number of a player to go to their draw section.

== Draw ==
Key

- Q = Qualifier
- WC = Wild card
- LL = Lucky loser
- Alt = Alternate
- ITF = ITF entry
- PR = Protected ranking
- SR = Special ranking
- SE = Special exempt
- JE = Junior exempt
- JR = Junior Accelerator Programme entrant
- CO = College Accelerator Programme entrant
- NG = Next Gen Accelerator Program entrant
- w/o = Walkover
- r = Retired
- d = Defaulted

=== Finals ===
Quarterfinals
1	(Australia) Lesley Turner	3	6	6
5	(United States) Kathleen Harter	6	2	2
7	(Australia) Margaret Court	6	6
3	(United States) Rosie Casals	0	2
3	(Australia) Judy Tegart	4	10	6
9	(Australia) Karen Krantzcke	6	8	3
(Netherlands) Astrid Suurbeek	1	2
1	(United States) Billie Jean King	6	6

Semifinals
1	(Australia) Lesley Turner	3	2
7	(Australia) Margaret Court	6	6
3	(Australia) Judy Tegart	6	1	2
1	(United States) Billie Jean King	4	6	6

Final
7	(Australia) Margaret Court	1	2
1	(United States) Billie Jean King	6	6

=== Top half ===
==== Section 1 ====
First round
(Australia) Dorothy Whitely	6	6
(Romania) Judith Dibar	2	4
(Australia) Kay Williams	3	2
(Netherlands) Eva de Jong	6	6
(Australia) Kerry Hogarth
13	(Australia) Lorraine Robinson	w/o
(Australia) Valerie Caulley	3	4
(Australia) L Griffiths	6	6
(Australia) Sue Hole	0	1
(Indonesia) Lita Liem	6	6
(Australia) Beryl Jenkins	6	4	10
(Australia) Wendy Gilchrist	2	6	8
(Australia) Loris Butterfield	1	3
5	(United States) Kathleen Harter	6	6

Second round
1	(Australia) Lesley Turner	6	6
(Australia) D Whitely	3	1
(Netherlands) E de Jong	6	6
(Australia) K Hogarth	2	2
(Australia) L Griffiths	5	6	4
(Indonesia) L Liem	7	3	6
(Australia) B Jenkins	2	7	4
5	(United States) K Harter	6	5	6

Third round
1	(Australia) L Turner	6	6
(Netherlands) E de Jong	0	1
(Indonesia) L Liem	2	3
5	(United States) K Harter	6	6

Quarterfinals
1	(Australia) L Turner	3	6	6
5	(United States) K Harter	6	2	2

==== Section 2 ====
First round
7	(Australia) Margaret Court	6	6
(Australia) Kerry Harris	3	0
(Australia) Cynthia Sieler	5	8	6
(United States) Geri Shepard	7	6	4
(Australia) Marilyn Tesch	6	6
(Australia) Helen Sheedy	3	1
(Australia) Evonne Goolagong	6	6
11	(Netherlands) Ada Bakker	4	0
11	(Australia) Gail Sherriff	6	6
(Australia) S Washbourne	1	1
(Australia) S Stephen	4	4
(Australia) Lexie Kenny	6	6
(Australia) Lynette Mansfield	2	1
(Australia) Lynne Nette	6	6
(Australia) Carol Sherriff	2	1
3	(United States) Rosie Casals	6	6

Second round
7	(Australia) M Court	6	6
(Australia) C Sieler	3	2
(Australia) M Tesch	3	2
(Australia) E Goolagong	6	6
11	(Australia) G Sherriff	9	6
(Australia) L Kenny	7	1
(Australia) L Nette	2	4
3	(United States) R Casals	6	6

Third round
7	(Australia) M Court	6	6
(Australia) E Goolagong	3	1
11	(Australia) G Sherriff	1	0
3	(United States) R Casals	6	6

Quarterfinals
7	(Australia) M Court	6	6
3	(United States) R Casals	0	2

=== Bottom half ===
==== Section 3 ====
First round
3	(Australia) Judy Tegart	6	6
(Australia) Janine Whyte	0	3
(Netherlands) Judith Salomé	6	8
(Australia) Helen O'Connor	2	6
(United States) Joan Johnson	0	1
(Indonesia) Lany Kaligis	6	6
(Australia) Patricia Edwards	3	7	6
(Australia) Heather McKechnie	6	5	1
9	(Australia) Karen Krantzcke	6	6
(Australia) Ann Jenkins	4	0
(Australia) Beverley Rae	6	2	6
(Australia) Janet Young	3	6	3
(Australia) Caroline Cooper	w/o
(Australia) Kaye Dening
(Australia) Kerry Wilkinson	4	1
7	(United States) Mary-Ann Eisel	6	6

Second round
3	(Australia) J Tegart	6	6
(Netherlands) J Salomé	1	1
(Indonesia) L Kaligis	10	2	6
(Australia) P Edwards	8	6	3
9	(Australia) K Krantzcke	6	6
(Australia) B Rae	4	4
(Australia) K Dening	6	4	3
7	(United States) M-A Eisel	3	6	6

Third round
3	(Australia) J Tegart	6	6
(Indonesia) L Kaligis	3	4
9	(Australia) K Krantzcke	6	6
7	(United States) M-A Eisel	2	3

Quarterfinals
3	(Australia) J Tegart	4	10	6
9	(Australia) K Krantzcke	6	8	3

==== Section 4 ====
First round
5	(Australia) Kerry Melville	6	8
(Australia) Alison McKenzie	4	6
(Australia) Sue Hastings	4	2
(Australia) Barbara Hawcroft	6	6
(Netherlands) Astrid Suurbeek	8	3	6
(Australia) Margaret Starr	6	6	1
(Australia) E Staples	3	4
9	(Mexico) Elena Subirats	6	6
13	(Australia) Helen Gourlay	3	6	5
(Australia) Lesley Hunt	6	3	7
(France) Yveline Boy	6	6
(Australia) Janine Murdoch	2	0
(Australia) Helen Amos
(Australia) D Brennan	w/o

Second round
5	(Australia) K Melville	6	7
(Australia) B Hawcroft	2	5
(Netherlands) A Suurbeek	6	5	6
9	(Mexico) E Subirats	3	7	4
(Australia) L Hunt	6	6
(France) Y Boy	1	3
(Australia) H Amos	0	2
1	(United States) Billie Jean King	6	6

Third round
5	(Australia) K Melville	6	3
(Netherlands) A Suurbeek	8	6
(Australia) L Hunt	3	4
1	(United States) BJ King	6	6

Quarterfinals
(Netherlands) A Suurbeek	1	2
1	(United States) BJ King	6	6

Preceded by 1967 U.S. National Championships – Women's singles	Grand Slam women's singles	Succeeded by 1968 French Open – Women's singles
