= Elena Subirats =

Mexican tennis player

- Full name: Elena Subirats Simon
- Country (sports): Mexico
- Born: 30 December 1947
- Died: 28 March 2018 (aged 70)

Singles

Grand Slam singles results
- Australian Open: 2R (1968)
- French Open: QF (1968)
- Wimbledon: 1R (1968)
- US Open: 3R (1967)

Doubles

Grand Slam doubles results
- Australian Open: 2R (1968)
- French Open: 2R (1964, 1965, 1967, 1968)
- Wimbledon: 2R (1968)
- US Open: 1R (1966, 1971)

Grand Slam mixed doubles results
- Australian Open: QF (1968)
- French Open: 3R (1964)
- Wimbledon: 4R (1965)
- US Open: QF (1965)

Elena Subirats Simon (30 December 1947 – 28 March 2018) was a Mexican professional tennis player.

Raised in Mexico City, Subirats was a singles gold medalist for her country at the 1966 Central American and Caribbean Games and 1967 Pan American Games.

Subirats reached the singles quarterfinals of the 1968 French Open, beating fourth seed Rosie Casals en route.

From 1968 to 1973, she was a member of the Mexico Federation Cup team playing in 16 rubbers with seven singles and two doubles wins.

Subirats' brother Jaime was also a tennis player.
