= 1968 Australian Championships =

- Date: 19–29 January 1968
- Edition: 56th
- Category: Grand Slam (ITF)
- Surface: Grass
- Location: Melbourne, Australia
- Venue: Kooyong Lawn Tennis Club

Champions

Men's singles
- (Australia) William Bowrey

Women's singles
- (United States) Billie Jean King

Men's doubles
- (Australia) Dick Crealy / (Australia) Allan Stone

Women's doubles
- (Australia) Karen Krantzcke / (Australia) Kerry Melville

Mixed doubles
- (Australia) Dick Crealy / (United States) Billie Jean King

Boys' singles
- (Australia) Phil Dent

Girls' singles
- (Australia) Lesley Hunt
- Australian Championships

The 1968 Australian Championships was a tennis tournament that took place in the outdoor Kooyong Stadium in Melbourne, Australia from 19 to 29 January. It was the 56th edition of the Australian Championships (now known as Australian Open), the 16th held in Melbourne, and the first Grand Slam tournament of the year. It was also the last Grand Slam tournament to be restricted to amateurs. The singles titles were won by Australian William Bowrey and American Billie Jean King.

== Seniors ==
=== Men's singles ===
(Australia) William Bowrey defeated (Spain) Juan Gisbert Sr. 7–5, 2–6, 9–7, 6–4
It was Bowrey's only Grand Slam title.

=== Women's singles ===
(United States) Billie Jean King defeated (Australia) Margaret Court 6–1, 6–2
It was King's 13th Grand Slam title.

=== Men's doubles ===
(Australia) Dick Crealy / (Australia) Allan Stone defeated (Australia) Terry Addison / (Australia) Ray Keldie 10–8, 6–4, 6–3
It was Crealy's 1st Grand Slam title. It was Stone's 1st Grand Slam title.

=== Women's doubles ===
(Australia) Karen Krantzcke / (Australia) Kerry Melville defeated (Australia) Judy Tegart / (Australia) Lesley Turner 6–4, 3–6, 6–2
It was Krantzcke's only Grand Slam title. It was Melville's 1st Grand Slam title.

=== Mixed doubles ===
(Australia) Dick Crealy / (United States) Billie Jean King defeated (Australia) Allan Stone / (Australia) Margaret Court by walkover
It was Crealy's 2nd Grand Slam title. It was King's 14th Grand Slam title.

== Juniors ==
=== Boys' singles ===
(Australia) Phil Dent

=== Girls' singles ===
(Australia) Lesley Hunt

Preceded by 1967 U.S. National Championships	Grand Slams	Succeeded by 1968 French Open
