= Geoff Pollard =

Australian tennis player

- Full name: Geoffrey Neil Pollard
- Country (sports): Australia
- Born: 18 January 1944 (age 81); Sydney, NSW, Australia
- Plays: Left-handed

Singles

Grand Slam singles results
- Australian Open: 3R (1968)
- Wimbledon: Q1 (1975)

Doubles

Grand Slam doubles results
- Australian Open: 2R (1968, 1971)

Grand Slam mixed doubles results
- Australian Open: 1R (1968)
Medal record
Universiade
Gold medal – first place	1967 Tokyo	Mixed doubles
Silver medal – second place	1970 Turin	Mixed doubles

Geoffrey Neil Pollard, AM (born 18 January 1944) is an Australian sports administrator and former professional tennis player. He was awarded a Member of the Order of Australia in the 1989 Australia Day Honours list.

== Biography ==
A left-handed player from Sydney, Pollard was active as a player in the 1960s and 1970s. He lost to John Newcombe in the junior singles final of the 1961 Australian Championships and earned selection on Australia's Junior Davis Cup team. In 1962 he was runner-up to Tony Roche in the 18s and under Orange Bowl tournament.

Pollard, a University of Sydney science graduate, partnered with Kaye Dening to win a mixed doubles gold medal at the 1967 Summer Universiade in Tokyo. He won through to the singles third round of the 1968 Australian Championships, where he was eliminated by the fifth-seed Barry Phillips-Moore.

During the 1980s, Pollard served as President of the New South Wales Lawn Tennis Association and was on the Board of Directors for the Australian Institute of Sport. He was also a senior lecturer in statistics at Macquarie University.

From 1989 to 2010 he was President of Tennis Australia.
