= Peter Marker =

Australian rules footballer

Personal information
- Full name: Peter Marker
- Born: 21 March 1949 (age 77); Adelaide, South Australia
- Original team: Rostrevor College
- Position: Half-forward / Centre

Playing career^{1}
Years	Club	Games (Goals)
1967–1978	Glenelg (SANFL)	239 (170)
- ^{1} Playing statistics correct to the end of 1978.

Career highlights
- SANFL debut with Glenelg in 1967; Glenelg Football Club Captain 1971-76; Glenelg Best & Fairest 1971; Glenelg Premiership Captain 1973; 15 State games for South Australia (Captain: 10 games – 1971-73, 1975); Glenelg Football Club Player Life Member; SANFL Player Life Member; South Australian Football Hall of Fame Inaugural Inductee 2002

Peter Marker (born 21 March 1949) is a former Australian rules footballer who played with and captained Glenelg in the SANFL during the late 1960s and 1970s, captaining the Tigers to the 1973 SANFL premiership, in what was the last SANFL Grand Final played at Adelaide Oval until the return of the premiership deciding game in 2014, some 41 years later.

== Playing career ==
=== Glenelg Tigers ===
Mostly playing as a centreman or across half-forward, Marker started his career at Glenelg in 1967. He was appointed captain in 1971 by coach Neil Kerley and went on to win Glenelg's 'Best & fairest' award in the same year. Marker remained Glenelg's captain until the end of the 1977 season in a stint which included the 1973 SANFL premiership over North Adelaide. Although he never won a Magarey Medal he finished a single vote shy in both 1971 and 1975.

=== South Australia ===
Marker was a regular South Australian football representative and captained them in 10 of his 15 interstate games. He featured in the 1969 Adelaide Carnival, the 1972 Perth Carnival and the 1975 Knockout Carnival, the last two as captain.

== Media career ==
Following his retirement from football, Peter Marker moved into the media where he became a highly respected and regarded sports presenter and football commentator firstly for Channel 9 then Channel 7 and finally Channel 10 in Adelaide. Marker was a regular voice for South Australian football during the 1980s working alongside Ian Day, Robert Oatey, Bruce McAvaney, Rick Keegan and Graham Campbell.

During this time he called a number of SANFL Grand Final's, including Glenelg's 1985 and 1986 premierships and their 1981, 1982 and 1987 Grand Final losses, as well as hosting various Magarey Medal presentations.

Peter Marker was also member of the Network Ten television coverage of the 1988 Summer Olympics in Seoul, South Korea. During the mid-1990s he was also a Ch.10 commentator for televised Adelaide 36ers home games at the Clipsal Powerhouse in the National Basketball League (NBL) alongside Mark Aiston.

In 2002 he was one of the 113 inaugural inductees into the South Australian Football Hall of Fame.
