= Robert Oatey =

Australian rules footballer and coach (1942–2019)

Personal information
- Full name: Robert Reginald Oatey
- Born: 16 August 1942
- Died: 17 September 2019 (aged 77); Adelaide, South Australia
- Position: Rover

Playing career^{1}
Years	Club	Games (Goals)
1961–1973	Norwood	232 (365)
1974–1978	Sturt	69 (67)
Total		301 (432)

Representative team honours
Years	Team	Games (Goals)
	South Australia	9 (?)

Coaching career
Years	Club	Games (W–L–D)
1968–1973	Norwood	126 (51–71–4)
- ^{1} Playing statistics correct to the end of 1978.

Career highlights
- Norwood best and fairest: 1967, 1968, 1971 & 1972; Norwood leading goalkicker: 1967, 1968 & 1969; Magarey Medal runner up: 1968; Norwood captain: 1968 to 1973; Sturt premiership player: 1974; Norwood Team of the Century; South Australian Football Hall of Fame inductee

Robert Reginald Oatey OAM (16 August 1942 – 17 September 2019) was an Australian rules footballer who played with Norwood and Sturt in the South Australian National Football League (SANFL). He was a member of the South Australian Football Hall of Fame.

== Early life ==
Oatey, the son of South Australian football great Jack Oatey, captained the first eighteen at Norwood Boy's High School winning the Hone Medal for Fairest and Best in the High School competition in 1959 and 1960. In 1960 Robert was invited to join the Norwood thirds (U19) for 4 games as a Reserve after playing for his school. He then played in the SANFL second semi and Grand Final which Norwood won by defeating North Adelaide FC 13 goals to one with Robert winning the prize of $10 as best player on the ground.

== SANFL career ==
A rover, Oatey kicked a goal with his first kick in league football for Norwood, in the 1961 season. He was amongst Norwood's best players in the loss to West Adelaide in the 1961 SANFL Grand Final.

Oatey won Norwood's best and fairest award for the first time in 1967 and was also the club's leading goalkicker. The following season he began a six-year tenure as Norwood's captain-coach, during which time he played his best football. He was runner up to Barrie Robran in the 1968 Magarey Medal count, in his first year as coach, a season when Norwood finished last on the ladder. He won another club best and fairest that year, then again in 1971 and 1972. Under Oatey, Norwood improved to fifth in 1970 and were fourth in both 1972 and 1973, but he would be replaced as coach by former North Adelaide player Bob Hammond in 1974.

From 1974 to 1978, Oatey played for Sturt, which were coached by his father. He was a Sturt premiership player in 1974, when the club defeated Glenelg in the grand final.

His nine interstate appearances for South Australia includes games at the 1966 Hobart and 1969 Adelaide Carnivals.

While at Norwood, Oatey played with his brother Peter, who also played tennis at the Australian Championships in the 1960s.

Following his retirement from playing, Robert Oatey became a television commentator for SANFL games, working with Adelaide's Channel 7 and Channel 9 alongside others such as Bruce McAvaney, Ian Day, Peter Marker, Rick Keegan and Graham Campbell.

== Honours ==
In 2000, Oatey was named as a forward pocket in Norwood's Team of the Century.

Oatey was an inaugural inductee into the South Australian Football Hall of Fame in 2002.

He received the Medal of the Order of Australia (OAM) in 2008, for his "service to Australian Rules football as a coach and as a contributor to the development of younger players."
