= Juan Gisbert Sr. =

Spanish tennis player (born 1942)

- Full name: Juan Gisbert Ortiga
- Country (sports): Spain
- Residence: Barcelona, Spain
- Born: 5 April 1942 (age 84) Barcelona, Spain
- Turned pro: 1968 (amateur tour from 1956)
- Retired: 1976
- Plays: Right-handed (one-handed backhand)

Singles
- Career record: 445-304
- Career titles: 14
- Highest ranking: No. 14 (1967, World's Top 20)

Grand Slam singles results
- Australian Open: F (1968)
- French Open: 4R (1966)
- Wimbledon: 2R (1963, 1972)
- US Open: 2R (1974)

Other tournaments
- Olympic Games: QF (1968, demonstration)

Doubles
- Career record: 218–71 (Open era)
- Career titles: 21

Grand Slam doubles results
- Australian Open: SF (1968)
- French Open: SF (1975, 1976)
- Wimbledon: QF (1972)
- US Open: 3R (1975)

Other doubles tournaments
- Tour Finals: W (1975)
- Olympic Games: F (1968, demonstration)
Medal record
Summer Universiade
Gold medal – first place	1967 Tokyo	Doubles
Mediterranean Games
Gold medal – first place	1971 İzmir	Doubles
Silver medal – second place	1967 Tunis	Singles
Silver medal – second place	1967 Tunis	Doubles
Silver medal – second place	1971 İzmir	Singles

Juan Gisbert Sr. (born 5 April 1942) is a retired Spanish professional tennis. He was ranked world No. 14 in 1967. He was active from 1956 to 1976 and won 14 career singles titles.

He won one ATP singles title (plus several others) and reached the finals at the Australian Championships in 1968 and Cincinnati in 1971.

In June 1965 he won the Conde de Godo Championships (currently Barcelona Open) in Barcelona on clay at the Réal Tennis Club defeating Manuel Santana, Rafael Osuna, and Martin Mulligan in best-of -five set matches.

Gisbert won the 1971 ATP Bavarian International Tennis Championships at Munich on clay defeating Mulligan, Christian Kuhnke, and Péter Szőke in the final.

== Grand Slam finals ==
=== Singles: (1 runner-up) ===
Result	Year	Championship	Surface	Opponent	Score
Loss	1968	Australian Championships	Grass	(Australia) Bill Bowrey	7–5, 2–6, 9–7, 6–4

== Grand Slam tournament performance timeline ==
Key
W	F	SF	QF	#R	RR	Q#	DNQ	A	NH

(W) winner; (F) finalist; (SF) semifinalist; (QF) quarterfinalist; (#R) rounds 4, 3, 2, 1; (RR) round-robin stage; (Q#) qualification round; (DNQ) did not qualify; (A) absent; (NH) not held; (SR) strike rate (events won / competed); (W–L) win–loss record.

=== Singles ===
Tournament	1962	1963	1964	1965	1966	1967	1968	1969	1970	1971	1972	1973	1974	1975	1976	SR
Australian Open	A	A	A	QF	A	A	F	A	A	A	A	A	A	A	A	0 / 2
French Open	1R	A	A	1R	4R	A	1R	A	2R	1R	2R	A	1R	1R	A	0 / 9
Wimbledon	1R	2R	A	1R	A	A	A	A	A	A	2R	A	A	A	A	0 / 4
US Open	A	A	A	A	A	A	A	A	A	A	A	A	2R	1R	1R	0 / 3
Strike rate	0 / 2	0 / 1	0 / 0	0 / 3	0 / 1	0 / 0	0 / 2	0 / 0	0 / 1	0 / 1	0 / 2	0 / 0	0 / 2	0 / 2	0 / 1	0 / 18

== Open Era career finals ==
=== Singles (1 title, 6 runner-ups) ===
Result	No.	Date	Tournament	Surface	Opponent	Score
Loss	1.	1968	Australian Championships	Grass	(Australia) Bill Bowrey	5–7, 6–2, 7–9, 4–6
Loss	2.	1971	Cincinnati, U.S.	Clay	(United States) Stan Smith	6–7, 3–6
Loss	3.	1972	New York City	Carpet (i)	(United States) Stan Smith	6–4, 5–7, 4–6, 1–6
Loss	4.	1974	Tokyo WCT, Japan	Hard	(Australia) Rod Laver	7–5, 2–6, 0–6
Loss	5.	1974	Cedar Grove, U.S.	Clay	(Romania) Ilie Năstase	4–6, 6–7
Win	1.	1975	Shreveport, U.S.	Clay	(Poland) Wojciech Fibak	6–3, 5–7, 6–1
Loss	6.	1975	Barcelona, Spain	Clay	(Romania) Ilie Năstase	1–6, 5–7, 2–6

=== Doubles (21 titles, 17 runner-ups) ===
Result	No.	Date	Tournament	Surface	Partner	Opponents	Score
Win	1.	1971	New York, U.S.	Carpet (i)	(Spain) Manuel Orantes	(United States) Jimmy Connors (Pakistan) Haroon Rahim	7–6, 6–2
Win	2.	1971	Salisbury, U.S.	Carpet (i)	(Spain) Manuel Orantes	(United States) Clark Graebner (Brazil) Thomaz Koch	6–3, 4–6, 7–6
Win	3.	1971	Barcelona WCT, Spain	Clay	(Socialist Federal Republic of Yugoslavia) Željko Franulović	(South Africa) Cliff Drysdale (Spain) Andrés Gimeno	7–6, 6–2, 7–6
Loss	1.	1972	Salisbury, U.S.	Carpet (i)	(Czechoslovakia) Vladimír Zedník	(Spain) Andrés Gimeno (Spain) Manuel Orantes	4–6, 3–6
Win	4.	1972	Brussels, Belgium	Clay	(Spain) Manuel Orantes	(Chile) Patricio Cornejo (Chile) Jaime Fillol	9–7, 6–3
Win	5.	1972	Eastbourne, England	Grass	(Spain) Manuel Orantes	(Greece) Nicholas Kalogeropoulos (Rhodesia) Andrew Pattison	8–6, 6–2
Win	6.	1972	Barcelona, Spain	Clay	(Spain) Manuel Orantes	(South Africa) Frew McMillan (Romania) Ilie Năstase	6–3, 3–6, 6–4
Loss	2.	1972	Paris Indoor, France	Hard (i)	(Spain) Andrés Gimeno	(France) Pierre Barthès (France) François Jauffret	3–6, 2–6
Win	7.	1973	Roanoke, U.S.	Carpet (i)	(United States) Jimmy Connors	(Australia) Ian Fletcher (United States) Butch Seewagen	6–0, 7–6
Loss	3.	1973	Omaha, U.S.	Carpet (i)	(United States) Jimmy Connors	(United States) William Brown (United States) Mike Estep	DEF
Loss	4.	1973	Des Moines, U.S.	Carpet (i)	(Romania) Ion Țiriac	(Czechoslovakia) Jiří Hřebec (Czechoslovakia) Jan Kukal	6–4, 6–7, 1–6
Loss	5.	1973	Salisbury, U.S.	Carpet (i)	(West Germany) Jürgen Fassbender	(United States) Clark Graebner (Romania) Ilie Năstase	6–2, 4–6, 3–6
Win	8.	1973	Barcelona, Spain	Clay	(Spain) Manuel Orantes	(United States) Mike Estep (Romania) Ion Țiriac	6–4, 7–6
Win	9.	1973	Monte Carlo, Monaco	Clay	(Romania) Ilie Năstase	(France) Georges Goven (France) Patrick Proisy	6–2, 6–2, 6–2
Loss	6.	1973	Florence, Italy	Clay	(Romania) Ilie Năstase	(Italy) Paolo Bertolucci (Italy) Adriano Panatta	3–6, 4–6
Win	10.	1973	Paris, France	Hard (i)	(Romania) Ilie Năstase	(United States) Arthur Ashe (United States) Roscoe Tanner	6–2, 4–6, 7–5
Loss	7.	1974	Tokyo WCT, Japan	Hard	(United Kingdom) Roger Taylor	(South Africa) Raymond Moore (New Zealand) Onny Parun	6–4, 2–6, 4–6
Win	11.	1974	Bournemouth, England	Clay	(Romania) Ilie Năstase	(Italy) Corrado Barazzutti (Italy) Paolo Bertolucci	6–4, 6–2, 6–0
Loss	8.	1974	Rome, Italy	Clay	(Romania) Ilie Năstase	(United States) Brian Gottfried (Mexico) Raúl Ramírez	3–6, 2–6, 3–6
Win	12.	1974	Barcelona, Spain	Clay	(Romania) Ilie Năstase	(Spain) Manuel Orantes (Argentina) Guillermo Vilas	3–6, 6–0, 6–2
Loss	9.	1975	Roanoke, U.S.	Carpet (i)	(Romania) Ion Țiriac	(United States) Vitas Gerulaitis (United States) Sandy Mayer	6–7, 6–1, 3–6
Win	13.	1975	Boca Raton, U.S.	Hard	(United States) Clark Graebner	(West Germany) Jürgen Fassbender (Romania) Ion Țiriac	6–2, 6–1
Win	14.	1975	Shreveport, U.S.		(United States) William Brown	(Hungary) János Benyik (Hungary) Róbert Machán	6–4, 6–4
Win	15.	1975	Bournemouth, UK	Clay	(Spain) Manuel Orantes	(Australia) Syd Ball (Australia) Dick Crealy	8–6, 6–3
Win	16.	1975	Hamburg, West Germany	Clay	(Spain) Manuel Orantes	(Poland) Wojciech Fibak (Czechoslovakia) Jan Kodeš	6–3, 7–6
Loss	10.	1975	Båstad, Sweden	Clay	(Spain) Manuel Orantes	(Sweden) Björn Borg (Sweden) Ove Nils Bengtson	6–7, 5–7
Win	17.	1975	Indianapolis, U.S.	Clay	(Spain) Manuel Orantes	(Poland) Wojciech Fibak (West Germany) Hans-Jürgen Pohmann	7–5, 6–0
Loss	11.	1975	Madrid, Spain	Clay	(Spain) Manuel Orantes	(Czechoslovakia) Jan Kodeš (Romania) Ilie Năstase	6–7, 6–4, 7–9
Win	18.	1975	Tehran, Iran	Clay	(Spain) Manuel Orantes	(South Africa) Bob Hewitt (South Africa) Frew McMillan	7–5, 6–7, 6–1, 6–4
Loss	12.	1975	Tokyo, Japan	Clay	(Spain) Manuel Orantes	(United States) Brian Gottfried (Mexico) Raúl Ramírez	6–7, 4–6
Win	19.	1975	Calcutta, India	Carpet (i)	(Spain) Manuel Orantes	(India) Anand Amritraj (India) Vijay Amritraj	1–6, 6–4, 6–3
Win	20.	1976	Valencia, Spain	Clay	(Spain) Manuel Orantes	(Italy) Corrado Barazzutti (Italy) Antonio Zugarelli	6–1, 6–4
Win	21.	1976	Munich, West Germany	Clay	(Spain) Manuel Orantes	(West Germany) Jürgen Fassbender (West Germany) Hans-Jürgen Pohmann	1–6, 6–3, 6–2, 2–3, ret.
Loss	13.	1976	Bournemouth, England	Clay	(Spain) Manuel Orantes	(Poland) Wojciech Fibak (United States) Fred McNair	6–4, 5–7, 5–7
Loss	14.	1976	Båstad, Sweden	Clay	(Poland) Wojciech Fibak	(United States) Fred McNair (United States) Sherwood Stewart	3–6, 4–6
Loss	15.	1976	Montreal, Canada	Hard	(Spain) Manuel Orantes	(South Africa) Bob Hewitt (Mexico) Raúl Ramírez	2–6, 1–6
Loss	16.	1976	Tehran, Iran	Clay	(Spain) Manuel Orantes	(Poland) Wojciech Fibak (Mexico) Raúl Ramírez	5–7, 1–6
Loss	17.	1976	Johannesburg, South Africa	Hard	(United States) Stan Smith	(United States) Brian Gottfried (United States) Sherwood Stewart	6–1, 1–6, 2–6, 6–7
