= Allan Stone =

Australian tennis player

- Full name: Allan James Stone
- Country (sports): Australia
- Born: 14 October 1945 (age 81) Launceston, Australia
- Turned pro: 1968 (amateur from 1963)
- Retired: 1978
- Plays: Right-handed

Singles
- Career record: 165–197 (Open era)
- Career titles: 11
- Highest ranking: No. 36 (21 October 1975)

Grand Slam singles results
- Australian Open: SF (1972)
- French Open: 3R (1968, 1969, 1970)
- Wimbledon: 3R (1977, 1978)
- US Open: 4R (1973)

Doubles
- Career record: 396-356
- Career titles: 15
- Highest ranking: No. 12 (23 August 1977)

Grand Slam doubles results
- Australian Open: W (1968, 1977)
- French Open: SF (1970)
- Wimbledon: F (1975)
- US Open: SF (1976)

Grand Slam mixed doubles results
- Australian Open: F (1968)
- Wimbledon: F (1975)

Allan James Stone (born 14 October 1945) is a former tennis player from Australia. He played amateur and professional tennis in the 1960s and 1970s. He was ranked as high as world No. 36 in singles and world No. 12 in doubles on the ATP rankings.

After his playing career, Stone became a sports commentator.

== Singles ==
In singles, he was finalist at the 1969 Cincinnati Open, losing the final to Cliff Richey in straight sets.

In 1970, he won the Western Australian Championships in Perth defeating Tom Gorman, Richard Russell, and Phil Dent in the final.

In 1971, he won the Washington Open defeating Eddie Dibbs in the final.

In 1972, he made the semifinal of the Australian Open singles, where he was defeated by that year's champion, Ken Rosewall.

Stone was selected to play Davis Cup for Australia and participated in five Davis Cup ties. His Davis Cup win-loss record is 6–0.

== Doubles ==
Stone found the majority of his success on the doubles court. He won 15 doubles titles during his career, including the Australian Open in 1977 and the Australian Championships (the predecessor to the Australian Open) in 1968.

He reached the semifinals of the 1974 Australian Open alongside partner American Steve Turner. He made the doubles final at Wimbledon in 1975 alongside Colin Dowdeswell, and won the US National Doubles Championship in 1969 with Dick Crealy.

=== 1969 US Open ===
There is some confusion over the 1969 US Open Championship title, which is held by Stone and Dick Crealy conjointly with Ken Rosewall and Fred Stolle.

The era of Open Tennis commenced in 1968, and at that time Boston was the home of the U.S. National Doubles Championship. However, the agents of some contract professionals demanded guaranteed prize money which could not be covered by the tournament. Accordingly, contract professionals boycotted the tournament, with many playing instead at Forest Hills, which was won by Rosewall and Stolle. Crealy and Stone won the doubles in Boston in 1969 as professionals, defeating Charlie Pasarell and Bill Bowrey.

In 1971, the USTA and Association of Tennis Professionals decided to combine the winners of both tournaments to make the Grand Slam tournament. This was not an issue for the winners of 1968 as both tournaments were won by Smith and Lutz. Crealy and Stone were asked if they would agree to share the 1969 title with Rosewall and Stolle - they readily agreed, especially as the latter were two of the great Australian players and because "tennis was played with much goodwill in those days."

== Personal ==
Born in Launceston, Tasmania, Stone moved to Victoria at a young age and played amateur tennis for the Warburton Tennis Club where he was coached by Mary Morton.

He attended Caulfield Grammar School and completed a Commerce Degree at the University of Melbourne.

== Grand Slam performance timeline ==
Key
W	F	SF	QF	#R	RR	Q#	DNQ	A	NH

(W) winner; (F) finalist; (SF) semifinalist; (QF) quarterfinalist; (#R) rounds 4, 3, 2, 1; (RR) round-robin stage; (Q#) qualification round; (DNQ) did not qualify; (A) absent; (NH) not held; (SR) strike rate (events won / competed); (W–L) win–loss record.

=== Singles ===
Tournament	1963	1964	1965	1966	1967	1968	1969	1970	1971	1972	1973	1974	1975	1976	1977		1978	W–L	Win %
Australian Open	1R	A	2R	2R	3R	3R	3R	3R	1R	SF	3R	3R	3R	2R	1R	3R	3R	0–0	–
French Open	A	A	A	2R	2R	3R	3R	3R	3R	A	1R	A	A	A	A		A	0–0	–
Wimbledon	A	A	A	2R	1R	1R	1R	2R	1R	A	A	A	1R	2R	3R		3R	0–0	–
US Open	A	A	A	1R	A	3R	2R	2R	2R	3R	4R	1R	2R	3R	A		A	0–0	–
Win–loss	0–1	0–0	1–1	3–4														0–0	–

Source: World Tennis

=== Doubles ===
Tournament	1965	1966	1967	1968	1969	1970	1971	1972	1973	1974	1975	1976	1977		1978	W–L	Win %
Australian Open	1R	2R	QF	W	QF	SF	2R	SF	QF	QF	F	1R	1R	W	QF	0–0	–
French Open	A	A	A	1R	3R	SF	4R	A	1R	A	A	A	A		A	0–0	–
Wimbledon	A	A	A	A	QF	1R	1R	A	A	A	F	3R	2R		1R	0–0	–
US Open	A	A	A	2R	QF	2R	3R	1R	3R	3R	2R	SF	A		A	0–0	–
Win–loss	0–1	1–1	2–1													0–0	–

Source: World Tennis

== Career finals ==
=== Singles: 9 (3 titles / 6 runner-ups) ===
Result	W-L	Date	Tournament	Surface	Opponent	Score
Win	1–0	1967	Kuala Lumpur, Malaysia			
Loss	1–1	1968	Adelaide, Australia	Grass	(Australia) Bill Bowrey	4–6, 3–6, 6–4, 4–6
Win	2–1	1968	Nairobi, Kenya	Clay	(Spain) Juan Manuel Couder	6–3, 7–5
Loss	2–2	1969	Cincinnati Open, US	Clay	(United States) Cliff Richey	1–6, 2–6
Win	3–2	1969	Connaught, London	Clay	(Australia) John Cooper	6–4, 6–2
Loss	3–3	1969	Brisbane, Australia	Grass	(Australia) Ray Ruffels	6-8, 6–4, 3–6, 3-6
Loss	3–4	1971	Auckland, New Zealand	Hard	(Australia) Bob Carmichael	6–7, 6–7, 3–6
Loss	3–5	1975	Baltimore, US	Carpet	(United States) Brian Gottfried	6–3, 2–6, 3–6
Loss	3–6	1975	La Costa WCT, US	Hard	(Australia) Rod Laver	2–6, 2–6

Source: ATP

=== Doubles: 34 (15 titles / 19 runner-ups) ===
Result	W-L	Date	Tournament	Surface	Partner	Opponents	Score
Win	1–0	Jan 1968	Australian Championships, Melbourne	Grass	(Australia) Dick Crealy	(Australia) Terry Addison (Australia) Ray Keldie	10–8, 6–4, 6–3
Loss	1–1	May 1968	Rome, Italy	Clay	(Greece) Nicholas Kalogeropoulos	(Netherlands) Tom Okker (United States) Marty Riessen	3–6, 4–6, 2–6
Win	2–1	Jan 1969	Victorian Open, Australia	Grass	(Australia) Dick Crealy	(Australia) Ray Ruffels (Australia) Bill Bowrey	9–7, 6–4, 6–4
Loss	2–2	Jul 1969	Indianapolis, US	Clay	(Australia) Dick Crealy	(Australia) Bill Bowrey (United States) Clark Graebner	4–6, 6–4, 4–6
Win	3–2	Aug 1969	US National Championships, Boston	Grass	(Australia) Dick Crealy	(Australia) Bill Bowrey (United States) Charlie Pasarell	9–11, 6–3, 7–5
Win	4–2	Jul 1970	Båstad, Sweden	Clay	(Australia) Dick Crealy	(Socialist Federal Republic of Yugoslavia) Željko Franulović (Czechoslovakia) Jan Kodeš	6–2, 2–6, 12–12, ret.
Loss	4–3	May 1971	Hamburg, Germany	Clay	(Australia) Dick Crealy	(Australia) John Alexander (Spain) Andrés Gimeno	4–6, 5–7, 9–7, 4–6
Loss	4–4	Oct 1972	Vancouver WCT, Canada	Carpet	(South Africa) Cliff Drysdale	(Australia) Bill Bowrey (United States) Clark Graebner	6–7, 0–6
Win	5–4	Jan 1973	Auckland, New Zealand	Grass	(Australia) Brian Fairlie	(Australia) Dick Crealy (Australia) Bob Carmichael	7–6, 4–6, 7–6, 6–2
Loss	5–5	Jan 1973	La Costa WCT, US	Hard	(Socialist Federal Republic of Yugoslavia) Nikola Pilić	(Australia) Roy Emerson (Australia) Rod Laver	7–6, 3–6, 4–6
Win	6–5	Apr 1973	Munich WCT, Germany	Carpet	(Socialist Federal Republic of Yugoslavia) Nikola Pilić	(South Africa) Cliff Drysdale (United States) Cliff Richey	7–5, 5–7, 6–4
Loss	6–6	Apr 1973	Johannesburg WCT, South Africa	Hard	(South Africa) Frew McMillan	(United States) Bob Lutz (United States) Stan Smith	1–6, 4–6, 4–6
Loss	6–7	Apr 1973	Gothenburg WCT, Sweden	Carpet	(Socialist Federal Republic of Yugoslavia) Nikola Pilić	(Australia) Roy Emerson (Australia) Rod Laver	7–6, 4–6, 1–6
Win	7–7	Jul 1973	Dutch Open, Netherlands	Grass	(Colombia) Ivan Molina	(Spain) Antonio Munoz (Spain) Andres Gimeno	4-6, 7–6, 6-4
Win	8–7	Aug 1973	Merion, US	Grass	(Australia) Colin Dibley	(United States) John Austin (United States) Fred McNair	7–6, 6–3
Loss	8–8	Oct 1973	Tokyo Outdoor, Japan	Hard	(Australia) Colin Dibley	(Australia) Mal Anderson (Australia) Ken Rosewall	5–7, 5–7
Loss	8–9	Nov 1973	Jakarta, Indonesia	Hard	(Australia) John Newcombe	(United States) Mike Estep (Australia) Ian Fletcher	5–7, 4–6
Win	9–9	Feb 1974	Richmond WCT, US	Carpet	(Socialist Federal Republic of Yugoslavia) Nikola Pilić	(Australia) John Alexander (Australia) Phil Dent	6–3, 3–6, 7–6
Win	10–9	Oct 1974	Melbourne, Australia	Grass	(United States) Raz Reid	(United States) Mike Estep (Australia) Paul Kronk	7–6, 6–4
Loss	10–10	Jan 1975	Australian Open, Melbourne	Grass	(Australia) Bob Carmichael	(Australia) John Alexander (Australia) Phil Dent	3–6, 6–7
Win	11–10	Feb 1975	Dayton Indoor, US	Carpet	(Australia) Ray Ruffels	(United States) Paul Gerken (United States) Brian Gottfried	7–6, 7–5
Loss	11–11	Apr 1975	Denver WCT, US	Carpet	(Australia) Bob Carmichael	(Australia) Roy Emerson (Australia) Rod Laver	2–6, 6–3, 5–7
Loss	11–12	Jul 1975	Wimbledon, London	Grass	(Rhodesia) Colin Dowdeswell	(United States) Vitas Gerulaitis (United States) Sandy Mayer	5–7, 6–8, 4–6
Loss	11–13	Sep 1975	San Francisco, US	Carpet	(Australia) Kim Warwick	(United States) Fred McNair (United States) Sherwood Stewart	2–6, 6–7
Loss	11–14	Apr 1976	São Paulo WCT, Brazil	Carpet	(United States) Charlie Pasarell	(Australia) Ross Case (Australia) Geoff Masters	5–7, 1–6
Loss	11–15	Apr 1976	Houston WCT, US	Clay	(United States) Charlie Pasarell	(Australia) Rod Laver (Australia) Ken Rosewall	4–6, 2–6
Win	12–15	Aug 1976	US Pro Championships, US	Clay	(Australia) Ray Ruffels	(United States) Mike Cahill (United States) John Whitlinger	3–6, 6–3, 7–6
Loss	12–16	Sep 1976	Woodlands Doubles, US	Hard	(Australia) Phil Dent	(United States) Brian Gottfried (Mexico) Raúl Ramírez	1–6, 4–6, 7–5, 6–7
Win	13–16	Oct 1976	Maui, US	Hard	(South Africa) Raymond Moore	(United States) Dick Stockton (United States) Roscoe Tanner	6–7, 6–3, 6–4
Loss	13–17	Mar 1977	La Costa, US	Hard	(Australia) Ray Ruffels	(South Africa) Bob Hewitt (South Africa) Frew McMillan	4–6, 2–6
Win	14–17	Oct 1977	Perth, Australia	Hard	(Australia) Ray Ruffels	(United States) Nick Saviano (United States) John Whitlinger	6–2, 6–1
Loss	14–18	Dec 1977	Sydney Outdoor, Australia	Grass	(Australia) Ray Ruffels	(Australia) John Alexander (Australia) Phil Dent	6–7, 6–2, 3–6
Win	15–18	Dec 1977	Australian Open-2, Melbourne	Grass	(Australia) Ray Ruffels	(Australia) John Alexander (Australia) Phil Dent	7–6, 7–6
Loss	15–19	Oct 1978	Brisbane, Australia	Grass	(Australia) Syd Ball	(Australia) John Alexander (Australia) Phil Dent	3–6, 6–7

Source: ATP

== Post-playing career ==
Stone is a sports commentator. He is one of the longest-serving television commentators on the Australian Open, first joining Seven Sport broadcasts in the 1970s and providing analysis alongside fellow legendary commentators Mike Williamson, Garry Wilkinson and Peter Landy.

== See also ==
- List of Caulfield Grammar School people
