= Dick Crealy =

Australian tennis player

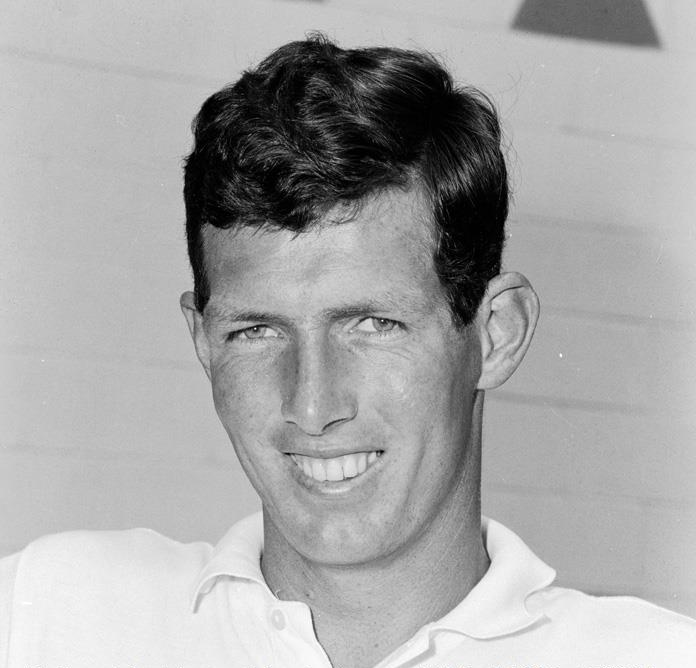
- Full name: Richard D. Crealy
- Country (sports): Australia
- Residence: Sydney, Australia
- Born: 18 September 1944 (age 82) Sydney, Australia
- Turned pro: 1969 (amateur tour from 1963)
- Retired: 1981
- Plays: Right-handed (one-handed backhand)

Singles
- Career record: 274–277 (Open era)
- Career titles: 5
- Highest ranking: No. 21 (7 September 1970)

Grand Slam singles results
- Australian Open: F (1970)
- French Open: 4R (1970)
- Wimbledon: 3R (1967, 1969, 1974)
- US Open: 2R (1969, 1973, 1978)

Doubles
- Career record: 262–240 (Open era)
- Career titles: 6

Grand Slam doubles results
- Australian Open: W (1968)
- French Open: W (1974)
- Wimbledon: SF (1975)
- US Open: W (1969)

Grand Slam mixed doubles results
- Australian Open: W (1968)
- French Open: QF (1971, 1974)
- US Open: QF (1969)

Richard (Dick) Crealy (born 18 September 1944) is an Australian former tennis player most notable for reaching the final of the Australian Open in 1970, being a member of the 1970 Australian Davis Cup Team, and winning four Grand Slam titles in doubles.

== Tennis career ==
Crealy was born in Sydney in 1944. In 1968 he achieved his first Grand Slam title at the Australian Open with his fellow countryman and teammate Allan Stone in doubles. He also won the mixed doubles with Billie Jean King. At the 1970 Australian Open Crealy beat Stan Smith in straight sets by "matching Smith's serving and volleying power at every turn". He lost the final to Arthur Ashe in straight sets, played in a light drizzle, making the grass surface slippery.

Crealy won the Men's Doubles at the 1974 French Open with Onny Parun over Stan Smith and Bob Lutz. In 1970, Crealy had his most successful season, reaching No. 5 on the Grand Prix rankings. In this year, he reached the singles final at the Australian Open, where he lost to American player Arthur Ashe, as well as the quarter-finals of the French Open. He also won the Swedish Open in Båstad and represented Australia in the Davis Cup with a 4–2 singles record and 2–0 doubles record. In 1974, he won another Grand Slam Title in doubles, combining with New Zealander Onny Parun in the French Open.

Crealy retired from the ATP Tour in 1978, but continued having success for many years on the Veteran's Tour, playing in many of the "Legends" tournaments at the Australian Open. He also still plays Pro-Ams, often supporting The Starlight Foundation in its annual tournament in Sydney.

Dick Crealy is a Life Member of the Australian Davis Cup Foundation.

=== 1969 US Open ===
There is some confusion over the 1969 US Open Championship title, which is held by Crealy and Allan Stone conjointly with Ken Rosewall and Fred Stolle.

The era of Open Tennis commenced in 1968, and at that time Boston was the home of the US National Doubles championship. However, the agents of some contract professionals demanded guaranteed prize money which could not be covered by the tournament. Accordingly, contract professionals boycotted the tournament, with many playing instead at Forest Hills, which was won by Rosewall and Stolle. Crealy and Stone won the Doubles in Boston in 1969 as professionals, defeating Charlie Pasarell and Bill Bowrey.

In 1971, the USTA and Association of Tennis Professionals decided to combine the winners of both tournaments to make the Grand Slam tournament. This was not an issue for the winners of 1968 as both tournaments were won by Smith and Lutz. Crealy and Stone were asked if they would agree to share the 1969 title with Rosewall and Stolle - they agreed, as the latter were two of the great Australian players and because "tennis was played with much goodwill in those days."

== Grand Slam finals ==
=== Singles (1 runner-up) ===
Result	Year	Championship	Surface	Opponent	Score
Loss	1970	Australian Open	Grass	(United States) Arthur Ashe	4–6, 7–9, 2–6

=== Doubles (2 titles) ===
Result	Year	Championship	Surface	Partner	Opponents	Score
Win	1968	Australian Championships	Grass	(Australia) Allan Stone	(Australia) Terry Addison (Australia) Ray Keldie	10–8, 6–4, 6–3
Win	1974	French Open	Grass	(New Zealand) Onny Parun	(United States) Robert Lutz (United States) Stan Smith	6–3, 6–2, 3–6, 5–7, 6–1

=== Mixed doubles (1 title) ===
Result	Year	Championship	Surface	Partner	Opponents	Score
Win	1968	Australian Championships	Grass	(United States) Billie Jean King	(Australia) Margaret Court (Australia) Allan Stone	walkover

== Grand Slam tournament performance timeline ==
Key
W	F	SF	QF	#R	RR	Q#	DNQ	A	NH

(W) winner; (F) finalist; (SF) semifinalist; (QF) quarterfinalist; (#R) rounds 4, 3, 2, 1; (RR) round-robin stage; (Q#) qualification round; (DNQ) did not qualify; (A) absent; (NH) not held; (SR) strike rate (events won / competed); (W–L) win–loss record.

=== Singles ===
Tournament	1963	1964	1965	1966	1967	1968	1969	1970	1971	1972	1973	1974	1975	1976	1977		1978	1979	1980	SR
Australian Open	2R	2R	A	1R	2R	QF	2R	F	2R	QF	1R	3R	SF	QF	3R	2R	2R	A	Q3	0 / 16
French Open	A	A	A	A	1R	3R	2R	4R	2R	1R	1R	2R	1R	1R	1R		1R	1R	A	0 / 13
Wimbledon	A	A	A	1R	3R	2R	3R	2R	1R	2R	A	3R	2R	1R	1R		1R	A	A	0 / 12
US Open	A	A	A	A	A	A	2R	1R	A	A	2R	1R	A	1R	A		2R	A	A	0 / 6
Strike rate	0 / 1	0 / 1	0 / 0	0 / 2	0 / 3	0 / 3	0 / 4	0 / 4	0 / 3	0 / 3	0 / 3	0 / 4	0 / 3	0 / 4	0 / 4		0 / 4	0 / 1	0 / 0	0 / 47

Note: The Australian Open was held twice in 1977, in January and December.

Source: World Tennis

== Open Era finals ==
=== Singles: 5 (2 titles / 3 runner-ups) ===
Grand Slam (0–1)
Tennis Masters Cup (0–0)
ATP Tour (2–2)

Result	W/L	Date	Tournament	Surface	Opponent	Score
Loss	0–1	Jan 1970	Australian Open	Grass	(United States) Arthur Ashe	4–6, 7–9, 2–6
Win	1–1	Jul 1970	Båstad, Sweden	Clay	(France) Georges Goven	6–3, 6–1, 6–1
Loss	1–2	Jul 1972	Kitzbühel, Austria	Clay	(Australia) Colin Dibley	1–6, 3–6, 4–6
Loss	1–3	Jun 1973	Manchester, United Kingdom	Grass	(United States) Sherwood Stewart	3–6, 4–6
Win	2–3	Mar 1975	Nice, France	Clay	(Colombia) Iván Molina	7–6, 6–4, 6–3

Source: ATP

=== Doubles: 21 (8 titles / 13 runner-ups) ===
Result	W/L	Date	Tournament	Surface	Partner	Opponents	Score
Win	1–0	Jan 1968	Australian Championships	Grass	(Australia) Allan Stone	(Australia) Terry Addison (Australia) Ray Keldie	10–8, 6–4, 6–3
Win	2–0	Aug 1969	US National Championships	Grass	(Australia) Allan Stone	(Australia) Bill Bowrey (United States) Charlie Pasarell	9–11, 6–3, 7–5
Win	3–0	Jan 1969	Victorian Open, Australia	Grass	(Australia) Allan Stone	(Australia) Ray Ruffels (Australia) Bill Bowrey	9–7, 6–4, 6–4
Loss	3–1	Jul 1969	Indianapolis, U.S.	Clay	(Australia) Allan Stone	(Australia) Bill Bowrey (United States) Clark Graebner	4–6, 6–4, 4–6
Win	4–1	Jul 1970	Båstad, Sweden	Clay	(Australia) Allan Stone	(Socialist Federal Republic of Yugoslavia) Željko Franulović (Czechoslovakia) Jan Kodeš	6–2, 2–6, 12–12, ret.
Win	5–1	Oct 1970	Phoenix, U.S.	Hard	(Australia) Ray Ruffels	(Czechoslovakia) Jan Kodeš (United States) Charlie Pasarell	7–6, 6–3
Loss	5–2	May 1971	Hamburg, Germany	Clay	(Australia) Allan Stone	(Australia) John Alexander (Spain) Andrés Gimeno	4–6, 5–7, 9–7, 4–6
Loss	5–3	Jul 1973	Washington, D.C., US	Clay	(Rhodesia) Andrew Pattison	(Australia) Ross Case (Australia) Geoff Masters	6–2, 1–6, 4–6
Win	6–3	Feb 1974	Hempstead WCT, U.S.	Hard	(United States) Jeff Borowiak	(Australia) Ross Case (Australia) Geoff Masters	6–7, 6–4, 6–4
Win	7–3	Jun 1974	French Open	Grass	(New Zealand) Onny Parun	(United States) Robert Lutz (United States) Stan Smith	6–3, 6–2, 3–6, 5–7, 6–1
Loss	7–4	Sep 1974	Cedar Grove, U.S.	Hard	(United States) Bob Tanis	(United States) Steve Siegel (Australia) Kim Warwick	6–4, 2–6, 1–6
Loss	7–5	Nov 1974	Bombay, India	Clay	(New Zealand) Onny Parun	(India) Anand Amritraj (India) Vijay Amritraj	4–6, 6–7
Win	8–5	Jan 1975	Baltimore, U.S.	Carpet (i)	(Australia) Ray Ruffels	(Egypt) Ismail El Shafei (South Africa) Frew McMillan	6–4, 6–3
Loss	8–6	May 1975	Bournemouth, UK	Clay	(Australia) Syd Ball	(Spain) Juan Gisbert (Spain) Manuel Orantes	6–8, 3–6
Loss	8–7	Aug 1975	South Orange, U.S.	Clay	(United Kingdom) John Lloyd	(United States) Jimmy Connors (Romania) Ilie Năstase	6–7, 5–7
Loss	8–8	Feb 1976	Rome WCT, Italy	Carpet (i)	(South Africa) Frew McMillan	(United States) Bob Lutz (United States) Stan Smith	7–6, 3–6, 4–6
Loss	8–9	May 1976	Hamburg, West Germany	Clay	(Australia) Kim Warwick	(United States) Fred McNair (United States) Sherwood Stewart	6–7, 6–7, 6–7
Loss	8–10	Sep 1976	Hamilton, Bermuda	Clay	(Australia) Ray Ruffels	(United States) Mike Cahill (United States) John Whitlinger	4–6, 6–4, 6–7^{(6–8)}
Loss	8–11	Aug 1977	Indianapolis, U.S.	Clay	(Australia) Cliff Letcher	(Chile) Patricio Cornejo (Chile) Jaime Fillol	7–6, 4–6, 3–6
Loss	8–12	Jul 1979	Kitzbühel, Austria	Clay	(Italy) Tonino Zugarelli	(Socialist Federal Republic of Yugoslavia) Željko Franulović (Switzerland) Heinz Günthardt	2–6, 4–6
Loss	8–13	Jan 1980	Perth, Australia	Grass	(Australia) Dale Collings	(Australia) Syd Ball (Australia) Cliff Letcher	3–6, 4–6

Source: ATP
