= Ray Keldie =

Australian tennis player

- Country (sports): Australia
- Born: 17 January 1946 (age 80)

Singles
- Career record: 70–102
- Career titles: 6
- Highest ranking: No. 113 (27 September 1974)

Grand Slam singles results
- Australian Open: 3R (1968)
- French Open: 1R (1968, 1970, 1974)
- Wimbledon: 3R (1973)
- US Open: 3R (1966, 1967)

Doubles
- Career record: 65–60
- Career titles: 0

Grand Slam doubles results
- Australian Open: F (1968)

Ray Keldie (born 17 January 1946) is a former tennis player from Australia. He competed in the Australian Open 8 times, the French Open 4 times, Italian Open 4 times, Wimbledon 9 times, US Open 7 times, Queens Club 4 times from 1965 to 1975.

In 1972, he won the Northumberland Championships at Newcastle defeating Premjit Lall in the final.

== Grand Slam finals ==
=== Doubles: (1 runner-up) ===
Result	Year	Championship	Surface	Partner	Opponents	Score
Lost	1968	Australian Championships	Grass	(Australia) Terry Addison	(Australia) Dick Crealy (Australia) Allan Stone	8–10, 4–6, 3–6

== Open Era career finals ==
=== Doubles: (2 runner-ups) ===
Result	W–L	Date	Tournament	Surface	Partner	Opponents	Score
Loss	0–1	May 1969	Barcelona, Spain	Clay	(Australia) Terry Addison	(Spain) Manuel Orantes (Chile) Patricio Rodríguez	10–8, 3–6, 1–6, 7–5, 2–6
Loss	0–2	Oct 1969	Berkeley, US	Hard	(Australia) Terry Addison	(Brazil) Thomaz Koch (United States) Stan Smith	1–6, 3–6
