= Terry Addison =

Australian tennis player

- Country (sports): Australia
- Born: 11 January 1946 (age 80) Wondai, Queensland
- Height: 5 ft 11 in (180 cm)

Singles
- Career record: 65–115
- Highest ranking: No. 100 (16 October 1973)

Grand Slam singles results
- Australian Open: 3R (1968)
- French Open: 2R (1970, 1971)
- Wimbledon: 3R (1968, 1969, 1970)
- US Open: 3R (1967, 1969)

Doubles
- Career record: 82–79

Grand Slam doubles results
- Australian Open: F (1968)

Terry Addison (born 11 January 1946) is an Australian former international tennis player. He competed in the Australian Open three times, from 1967 to 1969. He was born in Wondai, Queensland.

== Grand Slam finals ==
=== Doubles: (1 runner-up) ===
| Result | Year | Championship | Surface | Partner | Opponents | Score |
|---|---|---|---|---|---|---|
| Loss | 1968 | Australian Championships | Grass | (Australia) Ray Keldie | (Australia) Dick Crealy (Australia) Allan Stone | 8–10, 4–6, 3–6 |

== Open Era career finals ==
=== Doubles: 8 (1 title / 7 runner-ups) ===
| Result | W–L | Date | Tournament | Surface | Partner | Opponents | Score |
|---|---|---|---|---|---|---|---|
| Loss | 0–1 | May 1969 | Barcelona, Spain | Clay | (Australia) Ray Keldie | (Spain) Manuel Orantes (Chile) Patricio Rodríguez | 10–8, 3–6, 1–6, 7–5, 2–6 |
| Loss | 0–2 | Oct 1969 | Berkeley, US | Hard | (Australia) Ray Keldie | (Brazil) Thomaz Koch (United States) Stan Smith | 1–6, 3–6 |
| Win | 1–2 | Mar 1970 | Macon, US | Carpet | (Australia) Bob Carmichael | (Romania) Ilie Năstase (Romania) Ion Țiriac | 14–16, 6–4, 8–6 |
| Loss | 1–3 | Apr 1972 | Quebec WCT, Canada | Hard (i) | (Australia) John Alexander | (Australia) Bob Carmichael (Australia) Ray Ruffels | 6–4, 3–6, 5–7 |
| Loss | 1–4 | Dec 1972 | Johannesburg, South Africa | Hard | (Australia) Bob Carmichael | (Australia) John Newcombe (Australia) Fred Stolle | 3–6, 4–6 |
| Loss | 1–5 | Jan 1973 | Miami, US | Hard | (Australia) Colin Dibley | (Australia) Roy Emerson (Australia) Rod Laver | 4–6, 4–6 |
| Loss | 1–6 | Feb 1973 | Richmond, US | Carpet | (Australia) Colin Dibley | (Australia) Roy Emerson (Australia) Rod Laver | 6–3, 3–6, 4–6 |
| Loss | 1–7 | Apr 1973 | St. Louis WCT, US | Carpet | (Australia) Colin Dibley | (Sweden) Ove Nils Bengtson (United States) Jim McManus | 2–6, 5–7 |
