= Ray Ruffels =

Australian tennis player and coach

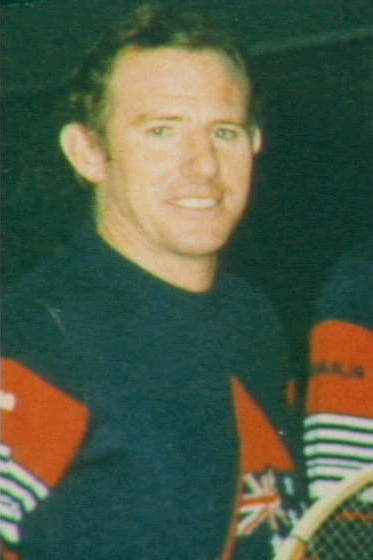
- AIS Head Tennis Coach Ray Ruffels in 1981
- Full name: Raymond Owen Ruffels
- Country (sports): Australia
- Born: 23 March 1946 (age 80) Sydney, Australia
- Turned pro: 1968 (amateur from 1964)
- Retired: 1980
- Plays: Left-handed (one-handed backhand)

Singles
- Career record: 246–204
- Career titles: 5
- Highest ranking: No. 27 (12 December 1976)

Grand Slam singles results
- Australian Open: SF (1968, 1969, 1976)
- French Open: 4R (1968)
- Wimbledon: QF (1967)
- US Open: 4R (1966)

Doubles
- Career record: 220–137
- Career titles: 16

Grand Slam doubles results
- Australian Open: W (1977)

Grand Slam mixed doubles results
- Wimbledon: F (1978)
- US Open: F (1978)

Raymond Owen "Ray" Ruffels (born 23 March 1946) is an Australian former professional tennis player and coach. During his career he won 5 singles and 16 doubles titles.

== Playing career ==
Ruffels was an Australian Open semi-finalist in 1968, 1969 and 1976, and a quarter-finalist in 1970 and 1977. In 1978, partnering with Billie Jean King in mixed doubles competition, Ruffels reached the final at Wimbledon and the US Open. Ruffels beat newly crowned US Open champion Stan Smith at the Wembley tournament in 1971. He had two wins over Ken Rosewall and one over John Newcombe in ATP events. He won five open era ATP singles titles at Hobart in 1968, Brisbane in 1969, Haverford in 1970, Auckland in 1972 and Perth indoors in 1976.

He was a member of the Australian Davis Cup team in 1968, 1969, 1970, and 1977.

== Career finals ==
=== Singles: 9 (5 titles / 4 runner-ups) ===
| Result | W–L | Date | Tournament | Surface | Opponent | Score |
|---|---|---|---|---|---|---|
| Loss | 0–1 | Jan 1968 | Perth, Australia | Grass | (Australia) Bill Bowrey | 8–6, 9–11, 2–6, 19-17, 4–6 |
| Win | 1–1 | Jan 1968 | Hobart, Australia | Grass | (United Kingdom) Graham Stilwell | 3–6, 6–8, 7–5, 7-5, 6–2 |
| Win | 2–1 | Dec 1969 | Brisbane, Australia | Grass | (Australia) Allan Stone | 8–6, 4–6, 6–3, 6-3 |
| Win | 3–1 | Aug 1970 | Haverford, US | Grass | (Chile) Jaime Fillol | 6–2, 7–6, 6–3 |
| Win | 4–1 | Dec 1971 | Auckland, New Zealand | Grass | (Australia) John Alexander | 6–4, 6–4, 7–6^{(5–3)} |
| Loss | 4–2 | Aug 1972 | Cleveland, US | Carpet | (United Kingdom) Mark Cox | 3–6, 6–4, 6–4, 3–6, 4–6 |
| Loss | 4–3 | Oct 1974 | Christchurch, New Zealand | Hard (i) | (United States) Roscoe Tanner | 4–6, 2–6 |
| Win | 5–3 | Oct 1976 | Perth, Australia | Carpet | (Australia) Phil Dent | 6–0, 4–6, 2–6, 6–3, 6–2 |
| Loss | 5–4 | Nov 1976 | Manila, Philippines | Clay | (New Zealand) Brian Fairlie | 5–7, 7–6, 6–7 |

Source: ATP

=== Doubles: 23 (16 titles / 7 runner-ups) ===
| Result | W–L | Date | Tournament | Surface | Partner | Opponents | Score |
|---|---|---|---|---|---|---|---|
| Win | 1–0 | Aug 1970 | Merion, US | Hard | (Australia) Bill Bowrey | (United States) Jim McManus (United States) Jim Osborne | 3–6, 6–2, 7–5 |
| Win | 2–0 | Oct 1970 | Phoenix, US | Hard | (Australia) Dick Crealy | (Czechoslovakia) Jan Kodeš (United States) Charlie Pasarell | 7–6, 6–3 |
| Win | 3–0 | Nov 1970 | Buenos Aires, Argentina | Clay | (Australia) Bob Carmichael | (Socialist Federal Republic of Yugoslavia) Željko Franulović (Czechoslovakia) Jan Kodeš | 7–5, 6–2, 5–7, 6–7, 6–3 |
| Win | 4–0 | Mar 1971 | Auckland, New Zealand | Grass | (Australia) Bob Carmichael | (New Zealand) Brian Fairlie (South Africa) Raymond Moore | 6–3, 6–7, 6–4, 4–6, 6–3 |
| Loss | 4–1 | May 1971 | Tehran WCT, Iran | Clay | (Australia) Bob Carmichael | (Australia) John Newcombe (Australia) Tony Roche | 4–6, 7–6, 1–6 |
| Loss | 4–2 | Jul 1971 | Washington WCT, US | Clay | (Australia) Bob Carmichael | (Netherlands) Tom Okker (United States) Marty Riessen | 6–7, 2–6 |
| Win | 5–2 | Feb 1972 | Toronto WCT, Canada | Carpet | (Australia) Bob Carmichael | (Australia) Roy Emerson (Australia) Rod Laver | 6–4, 4–6, 6–4 |
| Win | 6–2 | Apr 1972 | Quebec WCT, Canada | Indoor | (Australia) Bob Carmichael | (Australia) John Alexander (Australia) Terry Addison | 4–6, 6–3, 7–5 |
| Loss | 6–3 | Oct 1974 | Christchurch, New Zealand | | (Australia) Syd Ball | (Egypt) Ismail El Shafei (United States) Roscoe Tanner | W/O |
| Win | 7–3 | Jan 1975 | Auckland, New Zealand | Grass | (Australia) Bob Carmichael | (New Zealand) Brian Fairlie (New Zealand) Onny Parun | 7–6, RET. |
| Win | 8–3 | Jan 1975 | Baltimore WCT, US | Carpet | (Australia) Dick Crealy | (Egypt) Ismail El Shafei (South Africa) Frew McMillan | 6–4, 6–3 |
| Win | 9–3 | Feb 1975 | Dayton Indoor, US | Carpet | (Australia) Allan Stone | (United States) Paul Gerken (United States) Brian Gottfried | 7–6, 7–5 |
| Loss | 9–4 | Mar 1975 | Orlando WCT, US | Hard | (Australia) Colin Dibley | (United States) Brian Gottfried (Mexico) Raúl Ramírez | 4–6, 4–6 |
| Win | 10–4 | Apr 1975 | St. Louis, US | Clay | (Australia) Colin Dibley | (Australia) Ross Case (Australia) Geoff Masters | 6–4, 6–4 |
| Win | 11–4 | Feb 1976 | Dayton, US | Carpet | (United States) Sherwood Stewart | (Chile) Jaime Fillol (United States) Charlie Pasarell | 6–2, 3–6, 7–5 |
| Win | 12–4 | Mar 1976 | Little Rock, US | Carpet | (Australia) Syd Ball | (Paraguay) Giuliano Pecci (Pakistan) Haroon Rahim | 6–3, 6–7, 6–3 |
| Win | 13–4 | Aug 1976 | Boston, US | Clay | (Australia) Allan Stone | (United States) Mike Cahill (United States) John Whitlinger | 3–6, 6–3, 7–6 |
| Loss | 13–5 | Sep 1976 | Bermuda | Clay | (Australia) Dick Crealy | (United States) Mike Cahill (United States) John Whitlinger | 4–6, 6–4, 6–7 |
| Win | 14–5 | Nov 1976 | Bangalore, India | Clay | (Australia) Bob Carmichael | (India) Chiradip Mukerjea (India) Bhanu Nunna | 6–2, 7–6 |
| Loss | 14–6 | Mar 1977 | La Costa WCT, US | Hard | (Australia) Allan Stone | (South Africa) Bob Hewitt (South Africa) Frew McMillan | 4–6, 2–6 |
| Win | 15–6 | Oct 1977 | Perth, Australia | Hard | (Australia) Allan Stone | (United States) Nick Saviano (United States) John Whitlinger | 6–2, 6–1 |
| Loss | 15–7 | Dec 1977 | Sydney Outdoor, Australia | Grass | (Australia) Allan Stone | (Australia) John Alexander (Australia) Phil Dent | 6–7, 6–2, 3–6 |
| Win | 16–7 | Dec 1977 | Australian Open, Melbourne | Grass | (Australia) Allan Stone | (Australia) John Alexander (Australia) Phil Dent | 7–6, 7–6 |

Source: ATP

== Coaching career ==
Ruffels was appointed head national tennis coach of Tennis Australia in 1980. He was appointed the inaugural Head Coach of the Australian Institute of Sport (AIS) tennis program in 1981. He held this position until his retirement in January 1990. Whilst at the AIS, Ruffels coached many young players that would have successful professional careers including: Pat Cash, Wally Masur, Darren Cahill, Todd Woodbridge, Richard Fromberg, Simon Youl and Johan Anderson. After leaving the AIS, he coached Todd Woodbridge and Mark Woodforde, who as a doubles team won many major titles including the gold medal at the 1996 Atlanta Olympics.

In 2009, he returned to Australia to work at the AIS after being a national coach for the United States Tennis Association player development program in California.

In November 2016, he was awarded The President's Spirit of Tennis by Tennis Australia.

== Personal ==
Ruffels married professional tennis player Anna-Maria Fernandez and they have two children, Ryan and Gabriela; both have taken up golf as a career.
