= Bill Bowrey =

Australian tennis player

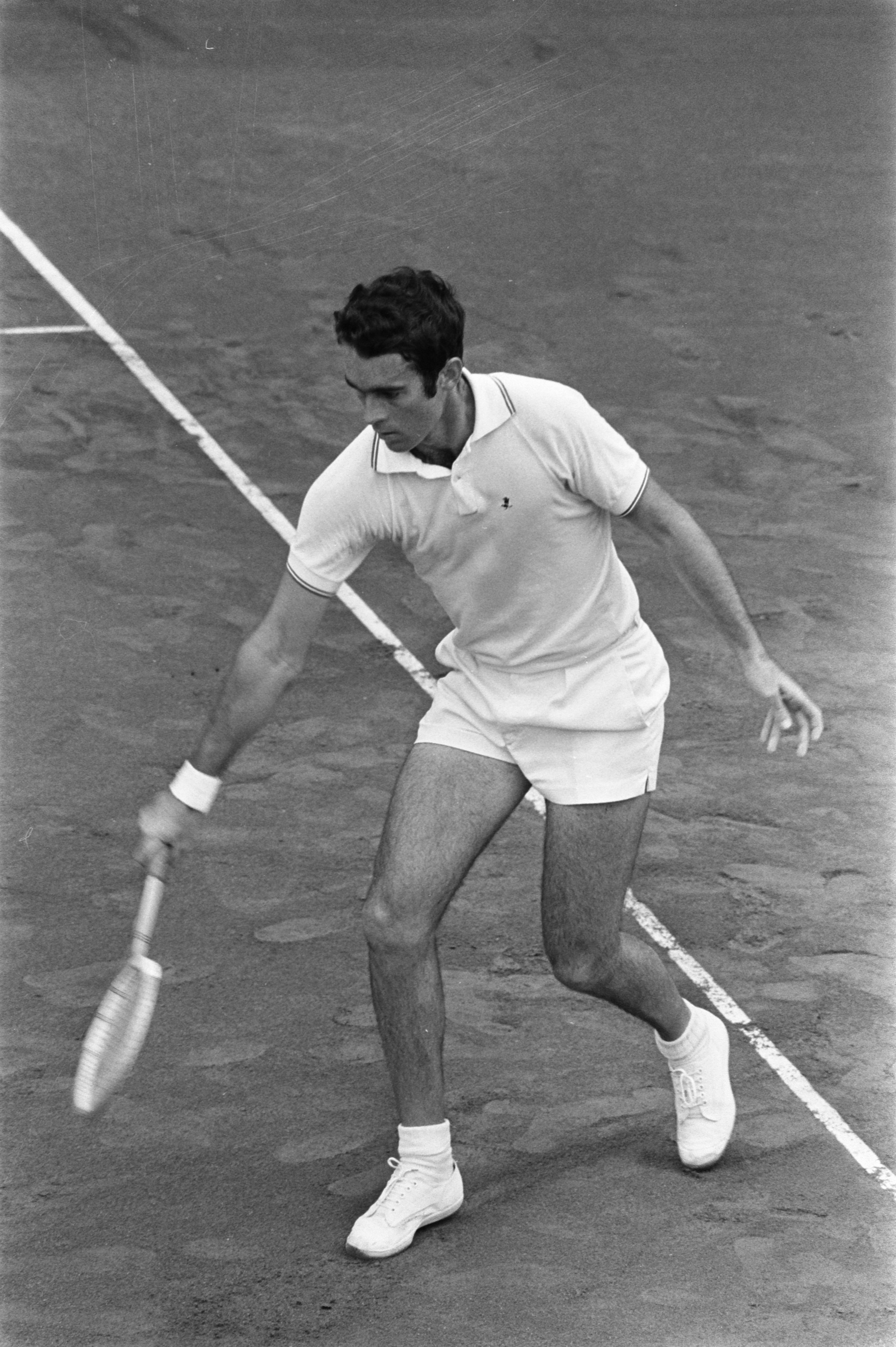
- Bill Bowrey at the 1970 Dutch Open
- Full name: William Walter Bowrey
- Country (sports): Australia
- Residence: Victoria, Australia
- Born: 25 December 1943 (age 82) Sydney, Australia
- Turned pro: 1968 (amateur from 1962)
- Retired: 1975
- Plays: Right-handed (1-handed backhand)

Singles
- Career record: 450–274
- Career titles: 21
- Highest ranking: No. 8 (1967, The New York Times)

Grand Slam singles results
- Australian Open: W (1968)
- French Open: 3R (1965, 1971)
- Wimbledon: 4R (1966)
- US Open: QF (1966)

Doubles
- Career record: 89–60
- Career titles: 5

Grand Slam doubles results
- Australian Open: F (1967)
- French Open: QF (1969, 1971)
- Wimbledon: F (1966)
- US Open: F (1967)

Grand Slam mixed doubles results
- Australian Open: F (1966)

William Bowrey (born 25 December 1943) is a former Australian tennis player. He was ranked world No. 8 in 1967.

Bowrey was born in Sydney, Australia and is best remembered as the last amateur to win the Australian Championships in 1968 before the tournament opened itself to professional tennis players in 1969.

== Biography ==
Bowrey reached the quarterfinal of the Australian (international amateur) Championships in 1965 (losing to John Newcombe), 1966 (losing to Roy Emerson) and 1967 (losing to Emerson) and the US Open quarters in 1966 (losing to Manuel Santana).

In 1966 he won the Sydney Metropolitan Grass Court Championships defeating Phil Dent, Dick Crealy, and Tony Roche in the final.

He won the 1967 Newport Casino Invitational title defeating Ray Moore, Tom Gorman, and Owen Davidson in the final.

At the 1967 US Open doubles, Bowrey and partner Owen Davidson lost the final to Newcombe and Roche in four sets.

Bowrey was ranked world No. 8 in 1967 by the New York Times.

At the end of 1967, Newcombe and Roche had signed professional contracts. Emerson, Santana and other European stars decided not to play in the 1968 Australian Championships (Emerson would turn pro on April 1, 1968), and Arthur Ashe, Clark Graebner, Stan Smith and Cliff Richey did not make the trip to Melbourne for the Australian Championships. Manuel Orantes and Juan Gisbert, who had played with Santana on the Spanish Davis Cup team in the Davis Cup Challenge Round in Australia at the end of 1967, decided to stay on and play at Melbourne. This reduced the quality of the field lined up for the 1968 Australian championships, which were held at Melbourne's historic Kooyong Lawn Tennis Club. Bowrey was the top seed. He defeated Mike Belkin in the quarterfinal and Barry Phillips-Moore in the semi-final. In the final Bowrey met Gisbert, ranked world No. 14, winning in four sets. A month after his Australian triumph Bowrey married the Australian women's player Lesley Turner, herself also a major champion, winner of the 1963 French Championships.

The game went open in April that year and in May Bowrey won the Atlanta Invitation defeating Ron Holmberg in the final. In August 1968 he won the Bilbao International tournament against Allen Fox.

At the first Open Wimbledon Bowrey lost in the second round to Andrés Gimeno. Defending his Australian title the following year Bowrey defeated Pancho Gonzales in the third round to reach the quarterfinals where he lost a two sets to love lead against Ray Ruffels.

Bowrey represented Australia in two Davis Cup rounds, the first against the U.S. in the World Group Final in December 1968, where he lost to Clark Graebner in five sets and defeated Arthur Ashe in four sets. The second in the North & Central America draw in May 1969 versus Mexico, where he won against Joaquín Loyo-Mayo and lost to Rafael Osuna.

Bowrey was also involved in one of the longest matches in tennis history at Wimbledon in 1970 against Patricio Cornejo that consumed nearly four hours and took 84 games.

In January 1970 Bowrey signed a professional contract with WCT, which meant that he was no longer a national professional and was now ineligible to play in the Davis Cup. Later that year Bowrey with partner Marty Riessen won the Rogers Cup (formerly Canadian Open) in two sets against Fred Stolle and Cliff Drysdale. He also won the Rome ATP World Tour Masters – Doubles that year with Owen Davidson.

Bowrey had married fellow tennis professional Lesley Turner in 1968 and went into semi-retirement in 1972 at the age of just 28, becoming a coach. After their playing careers were over, Bowrey and his wife Lesley became the lead match-play commentators at Wimbledon on the All-England Club's radio station and Internet Web site "Radio Wimbledon."

In February 1974, Bowrey won the New South Wales Hardcourt Championships, defeating Mark Edmondson in the semi-final and Stolle in the final in a close match.

== Grand Slam finals ==
=== Singles (1 title) ===
Result	Year	Championship	Surface	Opponent	Score
Win	1968	Australian Championships	Grass	(Spain) Juan Gisbert Sr.	7–5, 2–6, 9–7, 6–4

=== Doubles (3 runners-up) ===
Result	Year	Championship	Surface	Partner	Opponents	Score
Loss	1966	Wimbledon	Grass	(Australia) Owen Davidson	(Australia) Ken Fletcher (Australia) John Newcombe	3–6, 4–6, 6–3, 3–6
Loss	1967	Australian Championships	Grass	(Australia) Owen Davidson	(Australia) John Newcombe (Australia) Tony Roche	6–3, 3–6, 5–7, 8–6, 6–8
Loss	1967	U.S. Championships	Grass	(Australia) Owen Davidson	(Australia) John Newcombe (Australia) Tony Roche	8–6, 7–9, 3–6, 3–6

== Open Era career finals ==
=== Doubles: 6 (4 titles / 2 runner-ups) ===
Result	W/L	Date	Tournament	Surface	Partner	Opponents	Score
Loss	0–1	Apr 1970	Rome, Italy	Clay	(Australia) Owen Davidson	(Romania) Ilie Năstase (Romania) Ion Țiriac	6–0, 8–10, 3–6, 8–6, 1–6
Win	1–1	Aug 1970	Hilversum, Netherlands	Hard	(Australia) Owen Davidson	(Australia) John Alexander (Australia) Phil Dent	6–3, 6–4, 6–2
Win	2–1	Aug 1970	Toronto, Canada	Clay	(United States) Marty Riessen	(South Africa) Cliff Drysdale (Australia) Fred Stolle	6–3, 6–2
Win	3–1	Aug 1970	Merion, US	Hard	(Australia) Ray Ruffels	(United States) Jim McManus (United States) Jim Osborne	3–6, 6–2, 7–5
Win	4–1	May 1971	Bournemouth, UK	Clay	(Australia) Owen Davidson	(Chile) Patricio Cornejo (Chile) Jaime Fillol	8–6, 6–2, 3–6, 4–6, 6–3
Loss	4–2	Oct 1971	Wembley, UK	Carpet	(Australia) Owen Davidson	(South Africa) Bob Hewitt (South Africa) Frew McMillan	5–7, 7–9, 2–6

== Grand Slam tournament performance timeline ==
Key
W	F	SF	QF	#R	RR	Q#	DNQ	A	NH

(W) winner; (F) finalist; (SF) semifinalist; (QF) quarterfinalist; (#R) rounds 4, 3, 2, 1; (RR) round-robin stage; (Q#) qualification round; (DNQ) did not qualify; (A) absent; (NH) not held; (SR) strike rate (events won / competed); (W–L) win–loss record.

=== Singles ===
Tournament	1962	1963	1964	1965	1966	1967	1968	1969	1970	1971	1972	1973	1974	1975	1976	1977	SR
Australian Open	2R	2R	3R	QF	QF	QF	W	QF	3R	1R	A	1R	A	2R	A	A	1 / 12
French Open	A	A	2R	3R	1R	2R	A	2R	A	3R	A	A	A	A	A	A	0 / 5
Wimbledon	2R	A	1R	1R	4R	3R	2R	3R	2R	1R	A	A	A	A	A	Q2	0 / 9
US Open	A	A	4R	A	QF	4R	A	3R	3R	3R	A	A	A	A	A	A	0 / 6
Strike rate	0 / 2	0 / 1	0 / 3	0 / 3	0 / 4	0 / 4	1 / 2	0 / 4	0 / 3	0 / 4	0 / 0	0 / 1	0 / 0	0 / 1	0 / 0	0 / 0	1 / 32
