= Barry Phillips-Moore =

Australian tennis player (1928–2023)

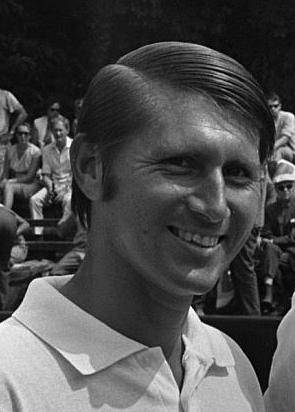
- Phillips-Moore in 1970
- Country (sports): Australian
- Born: 9 June 1938 Adelaide, Australia
- Died: 29 June 2023 (aged 85)
- Height: 1.73 m (5 ft 8 in)
- Turned pro: 1968 (amateur tour from 1954)
- Retired: 1980
- Plays: Left-handed (one-handed backhand)

Singles
- Highest ranking: No. 20 (10 June 1968)

Grand Slam singles results
- Australian Open: SF (1961, 1968)
- French Open: 4R (1961, 1962)
- Wimbledon: 3R (1972)
- US Open: 2R (1973, 1976)

Doubles
- Career record: 76–171 (Open Era)
- Career titles: 1 (Open era)

Grand Slam doubles results
- Australian Open: QF (1956, 1957, 1963, 1964, 1968, 1970, 1971, 1974)
- French Open: QF (1972)
- Wimbledon: 3R (1961, 1971)
- US Open: 3R (1974)

Grand Slam mixed doubles results
- Australian Open: QF (1957, 1963, 1968)
- Wimbledon: 2R (1971)

Barry Phillips-Moore (9 June 1938 – 29 June 2023) was an Australian tennis player of the 1950s, 1960s, and 1970s.

In singles, Phillips-Moore twice reached the semifinals of the Australian Championships, in 1961 and 1968. In doubles, he was a quarterfinalist at Australian Championships / Australian Open eight times and the French Open once, in 1972.

Phillips-Moore won the singles title at the 1968 ATP Auckland Open, defeating Onny Parun in a five-set final and in 1971 he won ATP Stuttgart Open defeating István Gulyás in the final.

In the mid-1970s he was the earliest adopted of the double-strung spaghetti tennis racquet in professional tennis.

After his active playing career he became a tennis coach for several players including Paul McNamee, Peter McNamara, Harold Solomon, Eddie Dibbs and Mark Woodforde.

Phillips-Moore died on 29 June 2023, at the age of 85.

== Career singles titles ==
No.	Date	Tournament	Surface	Opponent	Score
1.	Feb 1968	Auckland, New Zealand.		(New Zealand) Onny Parun	6–3, 6–8, 1–6, 6–3, 6–2
2.	Jul 1969	Montana-Vermala, Switzerland		(Czechoslovakia) Štěpán Koudelka	6–1, 6–2, 7–5

== Open Era career finals ==
=== Doubles (1 title) ===
Result	W/L	Date	Tournament	Surface	Partner	Opponents	Score
Win	1–0	Feb 1975	Little Rock, United States	Carpet	(Mexico) Marcello Lara	(United States) Jeff Austin (United States) Charles Owens	6–4, 6–3

=== Singles (1 runner-up) ===
Result	W/L	Date	Tournament	Surface	Opponent	Score
Loss	0–1	Jul 1974	Hilversum, Netherlands	Clay	(Argentina) Guillermo Vilas	4–6, 2–6, 6–1, 3–6
