= 1968 French Open – Men's doubles =

Men's doubles
- 1968 French Open

Final
- Champions: (Australia) Ken Rosewall (Australia) Fred Stolle
- Runners-up: (Australia) Roy Emerson (Australia) Rod Laver
- Score: 6–3, 6–4, 6–3

Details
- Draw: 60
- Seeds: 8

Events
Singles	men	women		boys	girls
Doubles	men	women	mixed	boys	girls
WC Singles	men	women	quad
WC Doubles	men	women	quad
Legends	−45	45+	women
← 1967 ·	French Open	· 1969 →

Ken Rosewall and Fred Stolle defeated Roy Emerson and Rod Laver 6–3, 6–4, 6–3 in the final to win the men's doubles title at the 1968 French Open tennis tournament. John Newcombe and Tony Roche were the defending champions but chose not to defend their title.

== Seeds ==
1. (Australia) Rod Laver / (Australia) Roy Emerson (final)
2. (Australia) Ken Rosewall / (Australia) Fred Stolle (champions)
3. (South Africa) Bob Hewitt / (South Africa) Frew McMillan (semifinals)
4. (Spain) Andrés Gimeno / (United States) Richard Pancho Gonzales (quarterfinals)
5. (Romania) Ilie Năstase / (Romania) Ion Țiriac (semifinals)
6. (Australia) Owen Davidson / (United Kingdom) Michael Sangster (third round)
7. (Brazil) Thomaz Koch / (Brazil) José Edison Mandarino (quarterfinals)
8. (Australia) John Alexander / (Australia) Dick Crealy (second round)

== Draw ==
=== Key ===
- Q = Qualifier
- WC = Wild card
- LL = Lucky loser
- Alt = Alternate
- ITF = ITF entry
- PR = Protected ranking
- SR = Special ranking
- SE = Special exempt
- JE = Junior exempt
- JR = Junior Accelerator Programme entrant
- CO = College Accelerator Programme entrant
- NG = Next Gen Accelerator Program entrant
- w/o = Walkover
- r = Retired
- d = Defaulted

=== Finals ===
Quarterfinals
2	(Australia) Ken Rosewall (Australia) Fred Stolle	7	6	6
7	(Brazil) Thomaz Koch (Brazil) José Edison Mandarino	5	4	3
3	(South Africa) Bob Hewitt (South Africa) Frew McMillan	6	6	6
(United Kingdom) Gerald Battrick (United Kingdom) Paul Hutchins	1	2	1
5	(Romania) Ilie Năstase (Romania) Ion Țiriac	6	6	10
4	(Spain) Andrés Gimeno (United States) Pancho Gonzales	3	2	8
(West Germany) Ingo Buding (Denmark) Torben Ulrich	0	3	4
1	(Australia) Roy Emerson (Australia) Rod Laver	6	6	6

Semifinals
2	(Australia) Ken Rosewall (Australia) Fred Stolle	6	6	6
3	(South Africa) Bob Hewitt (South Africa) Frew McMillan	2	3	4
5	(Romania) Ilie Năstase (Romania) Ion Țiriac	6	13	4	3
1	(Australia) Roy Emerson (Australia) Rod Laver	2	15	6	6

Final
2	(Australia) Ken Rosewall (Australia) Fred Stolle	6	6	6
1	(Australia) Roy Emerson (Australia) Rod Laver	3	4	3

=== Top half ===
==== Section 1 ====
First round
(Czechoslovakia) M Holeček (Czechoslovakia) J Kukal	6	6	6
(France) B de Troye (France) F Matheu	2	2	4
(France) A Bouteleux (France) M Leclercq	6	6	8
(Brazil) C Fernandes (Brazil) F Gentil	3	1	6
7	(Brazil) T Koch (Brazil) J Mandarino	w/o
(France) B Montrenaud (France) J Rouyer
(Australia) B Carmichael (Australia) C Stubs	w/o
(France) B Boutboul (France) Michel Berges
(Australia) T Addison (Australia) R Ruffels	w/o
(Australia) J Cooper (Australia) R Keldie
(France) P Darmon (France) F Jauffret	6	6	6
(United States) T Edlefsen (Canada) F Tutvin	4	1	4

Second round
2	(Australia) K Rosewall (Australia) F Stolle	6	6	6
(France) P Rinderknecht (France) J Vincent	0	0	2
(Czechoslovakia) M Holeček (Czechoslovakia) J Kukal	6	6	6
(France) A Bouteleux (France) M Leclercq	4	4	4
7	(Brazil) T Koch (Brazil) J Mandarino	6	6	13
(Australia) B Carmichael (Australia) C Stubs	1	0	11
(Australia) T Addison (Australia) R Ruffels	6	6	14
(France) P Darmon (France) F Jauffret	3	4	12

Third round
2	(Australia) K Rosewall (Australia) F Stolle'	6	6	5	4	6
(Czechoslovakia) M Holeček (Czechoslovakia) J Kukal	3	4	7	6	1
7	(Brazil) T Koch (Brazil) J Mandarino	6	6	6
(Australia) T Addison (Australia) R Ruffels	3	0	4

Quarterfinals
2	(Australia) K Rosewall (Australia) F Stolle	7	6	6
7	(Brazil) T Koch (Brazil) J Mandarino	5	4	3

==== Section 2 ====
First round
3	(South Africa) B Hewitt (South Africa) F McMillan	6	6	6
(France) J Fauvet (France) D Grozdanovitch	2	1	2
(South Africa) T Ryan (South Africa) R Summers	3	3	9	3
(Poland) W Gąsiorek (Poland) B Lewandowski	6	6	7	6
(France) P Beust (France) D Contet	6	6	5	7
(Australia) R Hawkes (New Zealand) O Parun	1	4	7	5
(France) R Haillet (France) J Borotra	0	1	0
(Belgium) C De Gronckel (New Zealand) B Fairlie	6	6	6
6	(Australia) O Davidson (United Kingdom) M Sangster	3	8	6	6
(Greece) N Kalogeropoulos (Australia) A Stone	6	6	2	4
(France) J Chaban-Delmas (France) H Pellizza	5	3	6	3
(Bolivia) E Gorostiaga (South Africa) Q Pretorius	7	6	2	6
(United States) H Fitzgibbon (United States) A Fox
(Australia) C Dibley (Jamaica) L Lumsden	w/o
(United Kingdom) G Battrick (United Kingdom) P Hutchins	w/o
(France) J Courcol (France) B Paul

Second round
3	(South Africa) B Hewitt (South Africa) F McMillan	6	6	6
(Poland) W Gąsiorek (Poland) B Lewandowski	2	3	0
(France) P Beust (France) D Contet	7	3	4	6	4
(Belgium) C De Gronckel (New Zealand) B Fairlie'	5	6	6	2	6
6	(Australia) O Davidson (United Kingdom) M Sangster	6	6	6
(Bolivia) E Gorostiaga (South Africa) Q Pretorius	1	1	2
(Australia) C Dibley (Jamaica) L Lumsden	4	7	10	2
(United Kingdom) G Battrick (United Kingdom) P Hutchins	6	9	8	6

Third round
3	(South Africa) B Hewitt (South Africa) F McMillan	6	6	7
(Belgium) C De Gronckel (New Zealand) B Fairlie	1	1	5
6	(Australia) O Davidson (United Kingdom) M Sangster	2	4	6	6
(United Kingdom) G Battrick (United Kingdom) P Hutchins	6	6	1	8

Quarterfinals
3	(South Africa) B Hewitt (South Africa) F McMillan	6	6	6
(United Kingdom) G Battrick (United Kingdom) P Hutchins	1	2	1

=== Bottom half ===
==== Section 3 ====
First round
(Hungary) I Gulyás (Hungary) F Komaromi	w/o
(France) P Joly (France) J Molinari
(Italy) G Di Maso (Italy) S Palmieri	1	2	3
(Australia) P Dent (Australia) B Giltinan	6	6	6
(France) J Chanfreau (France) W N'Godrella	0	6	6	6	6
(France) J Meyer (France) É Derasse	6	4	3	8	3
(United States) N Perry (Ecuador) E Zuleta	1	0	2
5	(Romania) I Năstase (Romania) I Țiriac	6	6	6
(France) J Barclay (France) G Goven	6	4	6	6
(United Kingdom) J Barrett (United Kingdom) D Lloyd	3	6	1	4
(France) C Duxin (France) P Proisy	4	3	4
(Australia) B Phillips-Moore (United States) C Richey	6	6	6
(Socialist Federal Republic of Yugoslavia) Ž Franulović (Socialist Federal Republic of Yugoslavia) B Jovanović	6	6	3	8
(Romania) S Dron (Romania) P Mărmureanu	4	2	6	6
(Belgium) E Drossart (Belgium) P Hombergen	5	2	3
4	(Spain) A Gimeno (United States) R Gonzales	7	6	6

Second round
(Hungary) I Gulyás (Hungary) F Komaromi	6	6	6	6	3
(Australia) P Dent (Australia) B Giltinan	8	3	8	4	6
(France) J Chanfreau (France) W N'Godrella	2	1	5
5	(Romania) I Năstase (Romania) I Țiriac	6	6	7
(France) J Barclay (France) G Goven	9	6	6
(Australia) B Phillips-Moore (United States) C Richey	7	3	3
(Socialist Federal Republic of Yugoslavia) Ž Franulović (Socialist Federal Republic of Yugoslavia) B Jovanović	4	3	4
4	(Spain) A Gimeno (United States) R Gonzales	6	6	6

Third round
(Australia) P Dent (Australia) B Giltinan	6	2	3	2
5	(Romania) I Năstase (Romania) I Țiriac	4	6	6	6
(France) J Barclay (France) G Goven	4	7	4	5
4	(Spain) A Gimeno (United States) R Gonzales	6	5	6	7

Quarterfinals
5	(Romania) I Năstase (Romania) I Țiriac	6	6	10
4	(Spain) A Gimeno (United States) R Gonzales	3	2	8

==== Section 4 ====
First round
(Peru) A Acuna (Peru) T González	6	1	6	4	0
(France) T Bernasconi (France) J Thamin	2	6	3	6	6
(Colombia) P Castillo (Colombia) Á Peña	3	4	1
(South Africa) R Moore (South Africa) B Maud	6	6	6
(France) P Pimpaneau (France) B Vallée	6	0	2	3
(West Germany) I Buding (Denmark) T Ulrich	4	6	6	6
(France) B Dufour (France) J Cartier	2	1	2
8	(Australia) J Alexander (Australia) D Crealy	6	6	6
(Australia) J Moore (Socialist Federal Republic of Yugoslavia) N Špear	6	6	6
(France) G Deniau (France) J Auget	3	1	4
(Chile) P Cornejo (Chile) J Pinto Bravo	6	7	5	3
(United Kingdom) M Cox (United Kingdom) B Wilson	8	5	7	6

Second round
(France) T Bernasconi (France) J Thamin	1	3	8
(South Africa) R Moore (South Africa) B Maud	6	6	10
(West Germany) I Buding (Denmark) T Ulrich	1	7	6	8
8	(Australia) J Alexander (Australia) D Crealy	6	5	3	6
(Australia) J Moore (Socialist Federal Republic of Yugoslavia) N Špear	5	5	6	1
(United Kingdom) M Cox (United Kingdom) B Wilson	7	7	1	6
(France) M Boulle (Chile) P Rodríguez	1	1	5
1	(Australia) R Emerson (Australia) R Laver	6	6	7

Third round
(South Africa) R Moore (South Africa) B Maud	6	3	2	6	1
(West Germany) I Buding (Denmark) T Ulrich	4	6	6	3	6
(United Kingdom) M Cox (United Kingdom) B Wilson	3	3	7
1	(Australia) R Emerson (Australia) R Laver	6	6	9

Quarterfinals
(West Germany) I Buding (Denmark) T Ulrich	0	3	4
1	(Australia) R Emerson (Australia) R Laver	6	6	6
