= 1968 French Open – Mixed doubles =

Mixed doubles
- 1968 French Open

Final
- Champion: (France) Jean-Claude Barclay (France) Françoise Dürr
- Runner-up: (Australia) Owen Davidson (United States) Billie Jean King

Details
- Draw: 56
- Seeds: 8

Events
Singles	men	women		boys	girls
Doubles	men	women	mixed	boys	girls
WC Singles	men	women	quad
WC Doubles	men	women	quad
Legends	−45	45+	women
- French Open

Owen Davidson and Billie Jean King were the defending champions, but lost to Jean-Claude Barclay and Françoise Dürr in the final, 6–1, 6–4.

== Seeds ==
1. (Australia) Owen Davidson / (United States) Billie Jean King (final)
2. (Romania) Ion Țiriac / (United Kingdom) Ann Jones (quarterfinals)
3. (South Africa) Frew McMillan / (South Africa) Annette Du Plooy (semifinals)
4. (South Africa) Bob Hewitt / (United States) Rosemary Casals (semifinals)
5. (United States) Cliff Richey / (United States) Nancy Richey (quarterfinals, retired)
6. (Australia) Ray Ruffels / (Australia) Karen Krantzcke (second round)
7. (France) Jean-Claude Barclay / (France) Françoise Dürr (champions)
8. (France) Pierre Darmon / (France) Rosie Darmon (quarterfinals)

Click on the seed number of a player to go to their draw section.

== Draw ==
Key

- Q = Qualifier
- WC = Wild card
- LL = Lucky loser
- Alt = Alternate
- ITF = ITF entry
- PR = Protected ranking
- SR = Special ranking
- SE = Special exempt
- JE = Junior exempt
- JR = Junior Accelerator Programme entrant
- CO = College Accelerator Programme entrant
- NG = Next Gen Accelerator Program entrant
- w/o = Walkover
- r = Retired
- d = Defaulted

=== Finals ===
Semifinals
7	(France) Jean-Claude Barclay (France) Françoise Dürr	6	6
3	(South Africa) Frew McMillan (South Africa) Annette Du Plooy	1	1
4	(South Africa) Bob Hewitt (United States) Rosemary Casals	7	3	1
1	(Australia) Owen Davidson (United States) Billie Jean King	5	6	6

Final
7	(France) Jean-Claude Barclay (France) Françoise Dürr	6	6
1	(Australia) Owen Davidson (United States) Billie Jean King	1	4

=== Top half ===
==== Section 1 ====
First round
7	(France) JC Barclay (France) F Dürr	6	6
(France) JL Auget (Argentina) R Giscafré	1	2
(France) P Proisy (France) M Cristiani	4	6	7
(South Africa) R Summers (South Africa) L Rossouw	6	4	5
(Italy) G Di Maso (France) M Salfati	6	6
(Peru) A Acuna (Peru) V Cáceres	3	3
(Australia) T Addison (Australia) K Melville	w/o
(Brazil) C Fernandes (Brazil) S Petersen

Second round
2	(Romania) I Țiriac (United Kingdom) A Jones	w/o
(Australia) B Phillips-Moore (Australia) A Phillips-Moore
(South Africa) Q Pretorius (South Africa) P Walkden	6	6
(France) A Bouteleux (France) D Bouteleux	3	1
7	(France) JC Barclay (France) F Dürr	6	6
(France) P Proisy (France) M Cristiani	4	3
(Italy) G Di Maso (France) M Salfati	6	6
(Australia) T Addison (Australia) K Melville	2	3

Third round
2	(Romania) I Țiriac (United Kingdom) A Jones	6	6
(South Africa) Q Pretorius (South Africa) P Walkden	1	2
7	(France) JC Barclay (France) F Dürr	6	6
(Italy) G Di Maso (France) M Salfati	0	0

Quarterfinals
2	(Romania) I Țiriac (United Kingdom) A Jones	6	5	0
7	(France) JC Barclay (France) F Dürr	4	7	6

==== Section 2 ====
First round
3	(South Africa) F McMillan (South Africa) A Du Plooy	w/o
(Hungary) F Komáromi (Hungary) É Szabó
(France) JL Rouyer (Australia) C Sherriff	6	6
(France) JP Cartier (France) S Le Besnerais	1	3
(Australia) B Giltinan (Australia) L Hunt	6	1	3
(Chile) P Cornejo (Australia) H Gourlay	3	6	6
(Australia) C Stubs (South Africa) J Lieffrig	11	8	5
(Socialist Federal Republic of Yugoslavia) N Špear (United States) J Heldman	9	10	7
6	(Australia) R Ruffels (Australia) K Krantzcke	w/o
(Poland) B Lewandowski (Sweden) C Sandberg
(France) J-B Chanfreau (Australia) G Sherriff	6	6
(Bolivia) E Gorostiaga (Sweden) I Löfdahl	3	2
(France) G Deniau (France) S Chatrier
(France) R Colin (Egypt) B Abbas	w/o
(Australia) A Stone (Sweden) E Lundquist	w/o
(France) J Chaban-Delmas (France) C Spinoza

Second round
3	(South Africa) F McMillan (South Africa) A Du Plooy	6	11
(France) JL Rouyer (Australia) C Sherriff	4	9
(Chile) P Cornejo (Australia) H Gourlay	w/o
(Socialist Federal Republic of Yugoslavia) N Špear (United States) J Heldman
6	(Australia) R Ruffels (Australia) K Krantzcke	5	7
(France) J-B Chanfreau (Australia) G Sherriff	7	9
(France) R Colin (Egypt) B Abbas	4	4
(Australia) A Stone (Sweden) E Lundquist	6	6

Third round
3	(South Africa) F McMillan (South Africa) A Du Plooy	w/o
(Chile) P Cornejo (Australia) H Gourlay
(France) J-B Chanfreau (Australia) G Sherriff	3
(Australia) A Stone (Sweden) E Lundquist	3^{r}

Quarterfinals
3	(South Africa) F McMillan (South Africa) A Du Plooy	11	7
(France) J-B Chanfreau (Australia) G Sherriff	9	5

=== Bottom half ===
==== Section 3 ====
First round
(France) J Borotra (France) M Galtier	1	0
(Mexico) J Subirats (Mexico) E Subirats	6	6
(Australia) C Dibley (South Africa) E Emmanuel
(Australia) P Dent (Australia) K Harris	w/o
(France) R Haillet (France) F De La Courtie-Billat	w/o
(Ecuador) E Zuleta (Ecuador) M Zuleta
(Australia) B Carmichael (Sweden) U Sandulf
5	(United States) C Richey (United States) N Richey	w/o
(France) C Duxin (France) N Niox-Château	w/o
(Soviet Union) V Kazakevich (Soviet Union) E Isopaitis
(France) M Boulle (Chile) M Rodríguez	6	1	1
(West Germany) I Buding (West Germany) E Buding	1	6	6
(Brazil) F Gentil (Brazil) MC Borba-Dias	2	3
(France) W N'Godrella (France) A-M Rouchon	6	6
(Romania) S Dron (Switzerland) A-M Studer
4	(South Africa) B Hewitt (United States) R Casals	w/o

Second round
(Mexico) J Subirats (Mexico) E Subirats
(Australia) P Dent (Australia) K Harris	w/o
(France) R Haillet (France) F De La Courtie-Billat	2	3
5	(United States) C Richey (United States) N Richey	6	6
(France) C Duxin (France) N Niox-Château	w/o
(West Germany) I Buding (West Germany) E Buding
(France) W N'Godrella (France) A-M Rouchon	1	2
4	(South Africa) B Hewitt (United States) R Casals	6	6

Third round
(Australia) P Dent (Australia) K Harris	2	5
5	(United States) C Richey (United States) N Richey	6	7
(France) C Duxin (France) N Niox-Château	1	2
4	(South Africa) B Hewitt (United States) R Casals	6	6

Quarterfinals
5	(United States) C Richey (United States) N Richey	4	1^{r}
4	(South Africa) B Hewitt (United States) R Casals	6	4

==== Section 4 ====
First round
(Romania) P Mărmureanu (Soviet Union) O Morozova	6	7	6
(South Africa) R Moore (South Africa) M Godwin	3	9	8
(France) B Vallée (France) É Terras	w/o
(New Zealand) B Fairlie (South Africa) G Dove
(Australia) J Moore (Australia) F Moore	w/o
(Poland) W Gąsiorek (France) O de Roubin
(Hungary) P Szőke (Mexico) P Montaño
8	(France) P Darmon (France) R Darmon	w/o

Second round
(South Africa) R Moore (South Africa) M Godwin	6	6
(France) B Vallée (France) É Terras	2	1
(Australia) J Moore (Australia) F Moore	4	3
8	(France) P Darmon (France) R Darmon	6	6
(Italy) S Palmieri (Belgium) I Loeys
(Greece) N Kalogeropoulos (Greece) C-A Kalogeropoulos	w/o
(South Africa) T Ryan (Colombia) P Palacios
1	(Australia) O Davidson (United States) BJ King	w/o

Third round
(South Africa) R Moore (South Africa) M Godwin
8	(France) P Darmon (France) R Darmon	w/o
(Greece) N Kalogeropoulos (Greece) C-A Kalogeropoulos	1	1
1	(Australia) O Davidson (United States) BJ King	6	6

Quarterfinals
8	(France) P Darmon (France) R Darmon	2	5
1	(Australia) O Davidson (United States) BJ King	6	7
