= 1968 French Open – Men's singles =

Men's singles
- 1968 French Open

Final
- Champion: (Australia) Ken Rosewall
- Runner-up: (Australia) Rod Laver
- Score: 6–3, 6–1, 2–6, 6–2

Details
- Draw: 135 (8 Q )
- Seeds: 16

Events
Singles	men	women		boys	girls
Doubles	men	women	mixed	boys	girls
← 1967 ·	French Open	· 1969 →

Ken Rosewall defeated Rod Laver in the final, 6–3, 6–1, 2–6, 6–2 to win the men's singles tennis title at the 1968 French Open. It was Rosewall's second French title and fifth Grand Slam tournament title overall. This was the first Grand Slam tournament to be open to professional players, marking a period in tennis history known as the Open Era. Rosewall and Laver, who had not appeared in a Grand Slam tournament since 1956 and 1962 respectively, were among those no longer barred from entering.

Roy Emerson was the defending champion, but lost in the quarterfinals to Pancho Gonzales.

Missing from the tournament were WCT's "Handsome Eight" and top amateurs Manuel Santana, Arthur Ashe, Clark Graebner and Tom Okker.

This was the first major appearance of future champion and world No. 1 Ilie Năstase.

== Seeds ==
1. (Australia) Rod Laver (final)
2. (Australia) Ken Rosewall (champion)
3. (Spain) Andrés Gimeno (semifinals)
4. (Australia) Roy Emerson (quarterfinals)
5. (United States) Pancho Gonzales (semifinals)
6. (Australia) Fred Stolle (second round)
7. (Australia) Lew Hoad (first round, withdrew)
8. (South Africa) Bob Hewitt (third round)
9. (Romania) Ion Țiriac (quarterfinals)
10. (West Germany) Wilhelm Bungert (first round, withdrew)
11. (Italy) Nicola Pietrangeli (first round, withdrew)
12. (Hungary) István Gulyás (fourth round)
13. (United States) Cliff Richey (fourth round)
14. (Australia) Ray Ruffels (fourth round)
15. (Czechoslovakia) Jan Kodeš (first round, withdrew)
16. (Soviet Union) Alex Metreveli (first round, withdrew)

Click on the seed number of a player to go to their draw section.

== Draw ==
=== Key ===
- Q = Qualifier
- WC = Wild card
- LL = Lucky loser
- Alt = Alternate
- ITF = ITF entry
- PR = Protected ranking
- SR = Special ranking
- SE = Special exempt
- JE = Junior exempt
- JR = Junior Accelerator Programme entrant
- CO = College Accelerator Programme entrant
- NG = Next Gen Accelerator Program entrant
- w/o = Walkover
- r = Retired
- d = Defaulted

=== Finals ===
Quarterfinals
2	(Australia) Ken Rosewall	8	6	3	6
(Brazil) Thomaz Koch	6	2	6	3
(Socialist Federal Republic of Yugoslavia) Boro Jovanović	4	0	2
3	(Spain) Andrés Gimeno	6	6	6
5	(United States) Pancho Gonzales	7	6	3	4	6
4	(Australia) Roy Emerson	5	3	6	6	4
9	(Romania) Ion Țiriac	6	6	3	3	0
1	(Australia) Rod Laver	4	4	6	6	6

Semifinals
2	(Australia) Ken Rosewall	3	6	7	3	6
3	(Spain) Andrés Gimeno	6	3	5	6	3
5	(United States) Pancho Gonzales	3	3	1
1	(Australia) Rod Laver	6	6	6

Final
2	(Australia) Ken Rosewall	6	6	2	6
1	(Australia) Rod Laver	3	1	6	2

=== Top half ===
==== Section 1 ====
First round
2	(Australia) K Rosewall	10	6	6
(United States) T Edlefsen	8	1	1
(Australia) C Stubs	6	6	1	6	6
(France) J-C Barclay	4	8	6	2	2
(Australia) B Geraghty	w/o
(Chile) J Pinto Bravo
(France) J-B Chanfreau	4	3	5
(Brazil) JE Mandarino	6	6	7
15	(Czechoslovakia) J Kodeš	w/o
(Brazil) F Gentil
(Poland) T Nowicki	w/o
(United Kingdom) P Hutchins
(Italy) S Tacchini	w/o
(United States) H Fitzgibbon
Q	(France) P Proisy
(India) R Krishnan	w/o

Second round
2	(Australia) K Rosewall	6	6	6
(Australia) C Stubs	1	1	0
(Chile) J Pinto Bravo	3	6	3	9
(Brazil) JE Mandarino	6	4	6	11
(Brazil) F Gentil	2	0	0
(United Kingdom) P Hutchins	6	6	6
(United States) H Fitzgibbon	6	7	6
Q	(France) P Proisy	3	5	3

Third round
2	(Australia) K Rosewall	6	6	6
(Brazil) JE Mandarino	2	4	2
(United Kingdom) P Hutchins	3	3	3
(United States) H Fitzgibbon	6	6	6

Fourth round
2	(Australia) K Rosewall	6	4	7	6
(United States) H Fitzgibbon	1	6	5	4

==== Section 2 ====
First round
7	(Australia) L Hoad	w/o
(Poland) W Gąsiorek
(South Africa) R Summers	6	4	6
(France) M Leclercq	8	6	8
(France) F Jauffret	8	6	6
(United Kingdom) J Barrett	6	4	2
(Ecuador) F Guzmán	w/o
(Czechoslovakia) J Kukal
10	(West Germany) W Bungert	w/o
Q	(France) Y Christiaen
(South Africa) T Ryan
(Philippines) A Marcial	w/o
(India) J Mukerjea	w/o
(France) G Pilet
(Socialist Federal Republic of Yugoslavia) Z Ivančić	w/o
(Brazil) T Koch

Second round
(Poland) W Gąsiorek	2	6	10	6	6
(France) M Leclercq	6	2	12	2	2
(France) F Jauffret	3	6	6	8
(Czechoslovakia) J Kukal	6	4	0	6
Q	(France) Y Christiaen	6	6	4	2	1
(South Africa) T Ryan	3	4	6	6	6
(France) G Pilet	4	2	5
(Brazil) T Koch	6	6	7

Third round
(Poland) W Gąsiorek	7	7	2	0	2
(France) F Jauffret	5	5	6	6	6
(South Africa) T Ryan	4	1	2
(Brazil) T Koch	6	6	6

Fourth round
(France) F Jauffret	1	1	1
(Brazil) T Koch	6	6	6

==== Section 3 ====
First round
3	(Spain) A Gimeno
(Philippines) E Cruz	w/o
(Romania) S Dron
(France) P Jauffret	w/o
Q	(France) P Joly	4	4	0
(West Germany) I Buding	6	6	6
(Czechoslovakia) P Štrobl
(Colombia) I Molina	w/o
14	(Australia) R Ruffels
(Soviet Union) V Kazakevitch	w/o
(Hungary) F Komáromi	4	2	6	3
(South Africa) F McMillan	6	6	3	6
(France) D Contet	0	0	0
(Socialist Federal Republic of Yugoslavia) N Špear	6	6	6
(Chile) P Cornejo
(Austria) D Herdy	w/o

Second round
3	(Spain) A Gimeno	5	6	6	6
(Romania) S Dron	7	1	3	2
(West Germany) I Buding
(Czechoslovakia) P Štrobl	w/o
14	(Australia) R Ruffels	5	7	6	8
(South Africa) F McMillan	7	5	4	6
(Socialist Federal Republic of Yugoslavia) N Špear	4	6	3	2
(Chile) P Cornejo	6	3	6	6

Third round
3	(Spain) A Gimeno	6	6	6
(West Germany) I Buding	3	4	3
14	(Australia) R Ruffels	6	6	6
(Chile) P Cornejo	4	2	2

Fourth round
3	(Spain) A Gimeno	6	6	6
14	(Australia) R Ruffels	4	4	3

==== Section 4 ====
Preliminary round
(Belgium) E Drossart	7	6	2	7
(Australia) J Bartlett	5	2	6	5
(Switzerland) D Sturdza	6	4	9	6
(Italy) G Di Maso	2	6	7	2
(Brazil) C Fernandes	10	4	6	6
Q	(France) B Boutboul	8	6	3	1
(France) B Montrenaud	3	6	6	8
(Australia) P Dent	6	4	3	6

First round
6	(Australia) F Stolle	3	7	6	3	6
(France) C Duxin	6	5	3	6	4
(Socialist Federal Republic of Yugoslavia) B Jovanović	6	6	6
Q	(United Kingdom) D Lloyd	1	0	1
(Romania) I Năstase	6	6	6
(France) J-P Olivier	2	1	2
(United Kingdom) M Sangster	7	6	6	6	0
(Australia) D Crealy	9	3	4	8	6
11	(Italy) N Pietrangeli	w/o
(United Kingdom) G Battrick
(France) J-P Courcol
(Bolivia) E Gorostiaga	w/o
(Belgium) E Drossart	6	4	4	1
(Switzerland) D Sturdza	3	6	6	6
(Brazil) C Fernandes	2	9	1
(France) B Montrenaud	6	11	6

Second round
6	(Australia) F Stolle	3	0	3
(Socialist Federal Republic of Yugoslavia) B Jovanović	6	6	6
(Romania) I Năstase	6	6	5	2
(Australia) D Crealy	4	8	7	6
(United Kingdom) G Battrick	6	10	6
(France) J-P Courcol	4	8	1
(Switzerland) D Sturdza	3	6	6	3	7
(France) B Montrenaud	6	4	3	6	5

Third round
(Socialist Federal Republic of Yugoslavia) B Jovanović	9	6	6	6	6
(Australia) D Crealy	7	8	2	8	2
(United Kingdom) G Battrick	6	6	6	6
(Switzerland) D Sturdza	4	4	8	3

Fourth round
(Socialist Federal Republic of Yugoslavia) B Jovanović	6	6	6
(United Kingdom) G Battrick	1	1	4

=== Bottom half ===
==== Section 5 ====
Preliminary round
(Hungary) P Szőke	6	6	3	1	5
(Ecuador) E Zuleta	2	2	6	6	7
(Jamaica) R Russell	3	2	0
(New Zealand) R Hawkes	6	6	6
(Australia) C Dibley	0	2	6	2
(France) B Paul	6	6	2	6

First round
(Ecuador) E Zuleta	3	4	6	7	6
(New Zealand) R Hawkes	6	6	3	5	0
(France) B Paul	1	1	1
(United Kingdom) M Cox	6	6	6
(Italy) M Gilardelli	w/o
(Denmark) T Ulrich
Q	(Canada) F Tutvin	2	1	4
12	(Hungary) I Gulyás	6	6	6
(Belgium) C De Gronckel
(Chile) P Rodríguez	w/o
(United States) N Perry	2	8	1	1
(France) P Darmon	6	6	6	6
(Australia) B Giltinan
(Soviet Union) S Likhachev	w/o
(Australia) R Keldie	2	0	6	3
5	(United States) R Gonzales	6	6	3	6

Second round
(Ecuador) E Zuleta	0	1	8	3
(United Kingdom) M Cox	6	6	6	6
(Denmark) T Ulrich	2	1	1
12	(Hungary) I Gulyás	6	6	6
(Belgium) C De Gronckel	5	0	1
(France) P Darmon	7	6	6
(Australia) B Giltinan	1	0	3
5	(United States) R Gonzales	6	6	6

Third round
(United Kingdom) M Cox	6	6	2	2
12	(Hungary) I Gulyás	3	8	6	6
(France) P Darmon	6	1	10	6
5	(United States) R Gonzales	1	6	12	8

Fourth round
12	(Hungary) I Gulyás	4	2	2
5	(United States) R Gonzales	6	6	6

==== Section 6 ====
First round
(Austria) P Pokorny	w/o
(Australia) A Stone
(France) Joseph Mateo	w/o
(Poland) B Lewandowski
(France) G Goven
(Italy) G Merlo	w/o
(Colombia) J Velasco	w/o
13	(United States) C Richey
(Italy) S Palmieri	7	4	4
(South Africa) R Maud	9	6	6
(New Zealand) B Fairlie	6	6	6
Q	(France) B de Troye	3	1	1
(France) P Beust	3	1	3
(Australia) B Phillips-Moore	6	6	6
(New Zealand) O Parun	7	1	2	2
4	(Australia) R Emerson	5	6	6	6

Second round
(Australia) A Stone	7	6	6
(Poland) B Lewandowski	5	1	0
(France) G Goven	3	3	6	9	4
13	(United States) C Richey	6	6	4	7	6
(South Africa) R Maud	6	4	3	7	6
(New Zealand) B Fairlie	2	6	6	5	3
(Australia) B Phillips-Moore	10	1	1
4	(Australia) R Emerson	12	6	6

Third round
(Australia) A Stone	5	3	5
13	(United States) C Richey	7	6	7
(South Africa) R Maud	1	3	7	3
4	(Australia) R Emerson	6	6	5	6

Fourth round
13	(United States) C Richey	6	4	6	9
4	(Australia) R Emerson	0	6	8	11

==== Section 7 ====
First round
(United States) M Riessen	w/o
(South Africa) R Moore
(Czechoslovakia) M Holeček	6	2	6	6
(Australia) T Addison	1	6	1	4
(Spain) M Orantes	w/o
(France) J-L Rouyer
(France) G Deniau	1	1	1
9	(Romania) I Țiriac	6	6	6
(Australia) J Moore	5	6	1	6	3
(South Africa) A Segal	7	3	6	1	6
(Spain) J Gisbert	w/o
(Socialist Federal Republic of Yugoslavia) Z Franulović
(Australia) A Cooper
(Japan) I Watanabe	w/o
Q	(France) J Thamin	1	5	0
8	(South Africa) R Hewitt	6	7	6

Second round
(South Africa) R Moore	11	1	6	7	3
(Czechoslovakia) M Holeček	9	6	2	9	6
(France) J-L Rouyer	1	2	1
9	(Romania) I Țiriac	6	6	6
(South Africa) A Segal	w/o
(Socialist Federal Republic of Yugoslavia) Z Franulović
(Australia) A Cooper	w/o
8	(South Africa) R Hewitt

Third round
(Czechoslovakia) M Holeček	6	6	5	2
9	(Romania) I Țiriac	3	8	7	6
(Socialist Federal Republic of Yugoslavia) Z Franulović	6	8	2	5	6
8	(South Africa) R Hewitt	2	6	6	7	4

Fourth round
9	(Romania) I Țiriac	6	6	6
(Socialist Federal Republic of Yugoslavia) Z Franulović	4	3	2

==== Section 8 ====
First round
(United Kingdom) R Wilson	6	3
(France) J-C Molinari	4	1^{r}
(Australia) R Carmichael	4	6	6	6
(Belgium) P Hombergen	6	3	1	0
(United States) A Fox	6	6	6
(Peru) A Acuña	2	1	0
(Australia) J Alexander
16	(Soviet Union) A Metreveli	w/o
(Colombia) Á Peña	4	1	1
(Sweden) L Ölander	6	6	6
(Romania) P Mărmureanu
(Colombia) W Álvarez	w/o
(Australia) R Howe	6	4	4	4
(Greece) N Kalogeropoulos	3	6	6	6
(Jamaica) L Lumsden	1	1	4
1	(Australia) R Laver	6	6	6

Second round
(United Kingdom) R Wilson	4	3	3
(Australia) R Carmichael	6	6	6
(United States) A Fox	6	3	6	9	6^{r}
(Australia) J Alexander	4	6	3	11	6
(Sweden) L Ölander	4	5	2
(Romania) P Mărmureanu	6	7	6
(Greece) N Kalogeropoulos	2	6	4	1
1	(Australia) R Laver	6	4	6	6

Third round
(Australia) R Carmichael	6	6	2	2	6
(Australia) J Alexander	3	1	6	6	3
(Romania) P Mărmureanu	2	0	7
1	(Australia) R Laver	6	6	9

Fourth round
(Australia) R Carmichael	0	1	1
1	(Australia) R Laver	6	6	6

Preceded by 1968 Australian Championships – Men's singles	Grand Slam men's singles	Succeeded by 1968 Wimbledon Championships – Men's singles
