= 1966 French Championships – Men's singles =

Men's singles
- 1966 French Championships

Final
- Champion: (Australia) Tony Roche
- Runner-up: (Hungary) István Gulyás
- Score: 6–1, 6–4, 7–5

Details
- Draw: 120
- Seeds: 16

Events
Singles	men	women
Doubles	men	women
← 1965 ·	French Championships	· 1967 →

Third-seeded Tony Roche defeated István Gulyás 6–1, 6–4, 7–5 in the final to win the men's singles tennis title at the 1966 French Championships.

== Seeds ==
The seeded players are listed below. Tony Roche is the champion; others show the round in which they were eliminated.

1. (Australia) Fred Stolle (quarterfinals)
2. (Australia) Roy Emerson (quarterfinals)
3. (Australia) Tony Roche (champion)
4. (Italy) Nicola Pietrangeli (third round)
5. (Australia) John Newcombe (third round)
6. (United States) Dennis Ralston (fourth round)
7. (United States) Cliff Richey (third round)
8. (South Africa) Cliff Drysdale (semifinals)
9. (France) Pierre Darmon (fourth round)
10. (France) François Jauffret (semifinals)
11. (Australia) Martin Mulligan (third round)
12. (Brazil) Thomaz Koch (third round)
13. (United Kingdom) Michael Sangster (second round)
14. (Spain) Juan Gisbert (fourth round)
15. (India) Jaidip Mukerjea (fourth round)
16. (Netherlands) Tom Okker (fourth round)

== Draw ==
=== Key ===
- Q = Qualifier
- WC = Wild card
- LL = Lucky loser
- r = Retired

=== Finals ===
Quarterfinals
1	(Australia) Fred Stolle	6	4	2	9
8	(South Africa) Cliff Drysdale	1	6	6	11
(Australia) Ken Fletcher	5	2	3
(Hungary) István Gulyás	7	6	6
(Soviet Union) Alexander Metreveli	7	3	1	5
3	(Australia) Tony Roche	5	6	6	7
10	(France) François Jauffret	1	6	6	4	6
2	(Australia) Roy Emerson	6	3	4	6	4

Semifinals
8	(South Africa) Cliff Drysdale	4	6	9	2	3
(Hungary) István Gulyás	6	2	7	6	6
3	(Australia) Tony Roche	6	6	6
10	(France) François Jauffret	3	4	4

Final
(Hungary) István Gulyás	1	4	5
3	(Australia) Tony Roche	6	6	7

=== Earlier rounds ===
==== Section 1 ====
First round
16	(Netherlands) Okker	6	6	6
(Morocco) Bouchaib	1	4	0
(Chile) Aguirre	4	2	6	6	6
(Spain) Gisbert	6	6	2	2	1
(India) Misra
(United States) McManus
(France) Leclercq	14	1	1	0
(Japan) Watanabe	12	6	6	6

Second round
1	(Australia) Stolle	6	6	6
(France) Loliée	0	1	1
(United States) Tym	5	4	4
(Brazil) Mandarino	7	6	6
16	(Netherlands) Okker	6	6	7
(Chile) Aguirre	4	1	5
(United States) McManus	11	4	10	6
(Japan) Watanabe	9	6	8	4

Third round
1	(Australia) Stolle	6	6	6
(Brazil) Mandarino	1	2	4
16	(Netherlands) Okker	9	6	6
(United States) McManus	7	1	1

Fourth round
1	(Australia) Stolle	2	5	6	6	6
16	(Netherlands) Okker	6	7	4	2	1

==== Section 2 ====
First round
8	(South Africa) Drysdale	6	6	6
(Chile) Rodríguez	4	2	4
(Australia) Cottrill	6	2	2
(Italy) Majoli	8	6	6
(France) Montrenaud	8	3	1
(Romania) Năstase	10	6	6
(Czechoslovakia) Kodeš	1	4	6	6	6
(Socialist Federal Republic of Yugoslavia) Franulović	6	6	3	2	1
9	(France) Darmon	4	7	6	6
(Soviet Union) Korotkov	6	5	1	1
(India) Venkatesan	4	1	4
(Chile) Pinto Bravo	6	6	6
(Australia) Stone
(United States) Riessen	r
(South Africa) Diepraam	6	4	6	6
(France) Courcol	1	6	3	0

Second round
8	(South Africa) Drysdale	3	6	6	5	7
(Italy) Majoli	6	2	4	7	5
(Romania) Năstase	6	5	5	6	6
(Czechoslovakia) Kodeš	3	7	7	4	1
9	(France) Darmon	6	6	4	6
(Chile) Pinto Bravo	2	3	6	1
(Australia) Stone	4	6	3	6	5
(South Africa) Diepraam	6	4	6	0	7

Third round
8	(South Africa) Drysdale	3	6	6	6
(Romania) Năstase	6	4	4	2
9	(France) Darmon	6	6	6
(South Africa) Diepraam	1	4	0

Fourth round
8	(South Africa) Drysdale	6	6	6
9	(France) Darmon	3	4	4

==== Section 3 ====
First round
4	(Italy) Pietrangeli	6	6	6
(United States) Higgins	0	0	4
(South Africa) Maud
(United States) Hoogs
(Poland) Gasiorek	8	0	3	5
(Australia) Fletcher	6	6	6	7
(France) Bouteleux
(Hungary) Komaromi
13	(United Kingdom) Sangster	9	6	6
(Italy) Bologna	7	3	1
(Ecuador) Zuleta	6	6	6
(Japan) Watanabe	1	3	4
(Denmark) Ulrich	6	6	8
(Czechoslovakia) Koudelka	1	3	6
(West Germany) Buding	6	6	6
(Australia) Ruffels	4	3	2

Second round
4	(Italy) Pietrangeli	6	6	3	4	6
(South Africa) Maud	0	3	6	6	3
(Australia) Fletcher	6	6	6
(France) Bouteleux	1	3	4
13	(United Kingdom) Sangster	6	1	4	2
(Ecuador) Zuleta	4	6	6	6
(Denmark) Ulrich	3	2	8
(West Germany) Buding	6	6	10

Third round
4	(Italy) Pietrangeli	6	0	1	2
(Australia) Fletcher	4	6	6	6
(Ecuador) Zuleta	3	4	3
(West Germany) Buding	6	6	6

Fourth round
(Australia) Fletcher	6	7	9
(West Germany) Buding	4	5	7

==== Section 4 ====
First round
5	(Australia) Newcombe	6	6	6
(United Kingdom) Matthews	3	1	3
(Belgium) De Gronckel
(Spain) Arilla
(United States) Graebner	6	6	6
(Romania) Mărmureanu	2	3	4
(Italy) Palmieri	3	2	2
(France) Contet	6	6	6
12	(Brazil) Koch	6	6	6
(Italy) Gaudenzi	3	2	3
(Canada) Puddicombe	5	4	2
(Czechoslovakia) Pála	7	6	6
(Ecuador) Olvera	6	4	6	6
(France) Beust	3	6	2	4
(Australia) Howe	5	3	4
(Hungary) Gulyás	7	6	6

Second round
5	(Australia) Newcombe	6	5	6	6
(Belgium) De Gronckel	0	7	0	3
(United States) Graebner	6	6	7	8
(France) Contet	3	3	9	6
12	(Brazil) Koch	6	6	6
(Czechoslovakia) Pála	1	3	1
(Ecuador) Olvera	1	5	0
(Hungary) Gulyás	6	7	6

Third round
5	(Australia) Newcombe	4	6	6	2
(United States) Graebner	6	2	8	6
12	(Brazil) Koch	4	5	6	3
(Hungary) Gulyás	6	7	3	6

Fourth round
(United States) Graebner	2	6	4	2
(Hungary) Gulyás	6	3	6	6

==== Section 5 ====
First round
(Colombia) Álvarez	6	6	6
(South Africa) Moore	3	3	3
(United Kingdom) Taylor	8	4	3	6
(Soviet Union) Metreveli	6	6	6	8
(Canada) Fauquier	8	6	3	6
(Australia) Moore	6	1	6	1
(Belgium) Drossart
11	(Australia) Mulligan
(Italy) Crotta	4	6	4	3
(Spain) Couder	6	2	6	6
(India) Lall
(Czechoslovakia) Javorský
(France) Pilet	3	6	6	6	6
(Japan) Ishiguro	6	8	4	2	2
(France) Paul	6	3	0
6	(United States) Ralston	8	6	6

Second round
(Colombia) Álvarez	0	2	4
(Soviet Union) Metreveli	6	6	6
(Canada) Fauquier	8	2	6	2
11	(Australia) Mulligan	10	6	4	6
(Spain) Couder	9	6	4	6
(Czechoslovakia) Javorský	7	3	6	1
(France) Pilet	6	2	2
6	(United States) Ralston	8	6	6

Third round
(Soviet Union) Metreveli	3	6	6	6
11	(Australia) Mulligan	6	1	3	3
(Spain) Couder	3	11	5	1
6	(United States) Ralston	6	9	7	6

Fourth round
(Soviet Union) Metreveli	8	2	6	6
6	(United States) Ralston	6	6	1	3

==== Section 6 ====
First round
(Italy) Di Maso	2	4	6	6	6
(United States) Holmberg	6	6	4	0	1
(France) Goven	6	6	6
(Canada) Carpenter	1	1	2
(Australia) Bowrey	5	6	1	4
(South Africa) McMillan	7	1	6	6
(Japan) Yanagi	6	4	7	2
14	(Spain) Gisbert	8	6	5	6
(Argentina) Peralta
(Greece) Kalogeropoulos
(France) Chanfreau	6	1	3	0
(Brazil) Barnes	4	6	6	6
(South Africa) Van Lingen	3	3	1
(Italy) Merlo	6	6	6
(Poland) Licis	5	6	1	6	0r
3	(Australia) Roche	7	4	6	4	2

Second round
(Italy) Di Maso	6	4	7
(France) Goven	8	6	9
(South Africa) McMillan	6	2	3	2
14	(Spain) Gisbert	4	6	6	6
(Argentina) Peralta	5	2	2
(Brazil) Barnes	7	6	6
(Italy) Merlo	4	4	2
3	(Australia) Roche	6	6	6

Third round
(France) Goven	6	1	6	7	4
14	(Spain) Gisbert	8	6	2	5	6
(Brazil) Barnes	2	6	0	5
3	(Australia) Roche	6	3	6	7

Fourth round
14	(Spain) Gisbert	4	1	2
3	(Australia) Roche	6	6	6

==== Section 7 ====
First round
(Romania) Țiriac	6	6	6
(United Kingdom) Wilson	3	4	4
(France) Jauffret	0	3	7	6	5
(Australia) Davidson	6	6	5	4	7
(Colombia) Molina	6	1	2	9
(South Africa) Segal	1	6	6	11
(Japan) Konishi	6	6	2	1	5
10	(France) Jauffret	3	3	6	6	7
(Belgium) Hombergen	3	3	1
(Socialist Federal Republic of Yugoslavia) Špear	6	6	6
(France) Barclay
(Hungary) Szikszay
(France) Jalabert	4	0	r
(Soviet Union) Likhachev	6	6
(United Kingdom) Stilwell	3	3	4
7	(United States) Richey	6	6	6

Second round
(Romania) Țiriac	6	6	5	7
(Australia) Davidson	4	4	7	5
(South Africa) Segal	4	3	2
10	(France) Jauffret	6	6	6
(Socialist Federal Republic of Yugoslavia) Špear	6	6	6
(France) Barclay	3	2	2
(Soviet Union) Likhachev	2	3	5
7	(United States) Richey	6	6	7

Third round
(Romania) Țiriac	7	4	4	4
10	(France) Jauffret	5	6	6	6
(Socialist Federal Republic of Yugoslavia) Špear	6	7	6	6
7	(United States) Richey	8	5	0	0

Fourth round
10	(France) Jauffret	6	3	6	6
(Socialist Federal Republic of Yugoslavia) Špear	3	6	4	2

==== Section 8 ====
First round
(Sweden) Johansson	6	6	1	4	2
(South Africa) Ryan	3	2	6	6	6
(Ecuador) Guzmán	6	1	6	6
(Canada) Belkin	4	6	3	0
(Italy) Tacchini	9	6	7	1	1
(West Germany) Elschenbroich	7	3	9	6	6
(Australia) Carmichael	3	1	6	4
15	(India) Mukerjea	6	6	3	6

Second round
(South Africa) Ryan	1	8	3
(Ecuador) Guzmán	6	10	6
(West Germany) Elschenbroich	6	4	5
15	(India) Mukerjea	8	6	7
(South Africa) Zeeman	1	0	3
(United States) Sack	6	6	6
(France) Boutboul	3	7	5
2	(Australia) Emerson	6	9	7

Third round
(Ecuador) Guzmán	7	6	5	3
15	(India) Mukerjea	9	4	7	6
(United States) Sack	1	3	2
2	(Australia) Emerson	6	6	6

Fourth round
15	(India) Mukerjea	4	3	1
2	(Australia) Emerson	6	6	6

Preceded by 1966 Australian Championships – Men's singles	Grand Slam men's singles	Succeeded by 1966 Wimbledon Championships – Men's singles
