= 1965 French Championships – Men's singles =

Men's singles
- 1965 French Championships

Final
- Champion: (Australia) Fred Stolle
- Runner-up: (Australia) Tony Roche
- Score: 3–6, 6–0, 6–2, 6–3

Details
- Draw: 120
- Seeds: 16

Events
| Singles | men | women |
| Doubles | men | women |
| ← 1964 · | French Championships | · 1966 → |

Fourth-seeded Fred Stolle defeated Tony Roche 3–6, 6–0, 6–2, 6–3 in the final to win the men's singles tennis title at the 1965 French Championships.

== Seeds ==
The seeded players are listed below. Fred Stolle is the champion; others show the round in which they were eliminated.

1. (Spain) Manuel Santana (second round)
2. (Australia) Roy Emerson (semifinals)
3. (Italy) Nicola Pietrangeli (fourth round)
4. (Australia) Fred Stolle (champion)
5. (France) Pierre Darmon (fourth round)
6. (Australia) Martin Mulligan (third round)
7. (Australia) Neale Fraser (second round)
8. (South Africa) Cliff Drysdale (semifinals)
9. (India) Ramanathan Krishnan (fourth round)
10. (South Africa) Keith Diepraam (second round)
11. (United States) Frank A. Froehling (second round)
12. (Australia) John Newcombe (quarterfinals)
13. (Hungary) István Gulyás (second round)
14. (Australia) Tony Roche (final)
15. (India) Jaidip Mukerjea (fourth round)
16. (United Kingdom) Michael Sangster (second round)

== Draw ==
=== Key ===
- Q = Qualifier
- WC = Wild card
- LL = Lucky loser
- r = Retired

=== Finals ===
Quarterfinals
(Soviet Union) Toomas Leius
8 | (South Africa) Cliff Drysdale | w/o
4 | (Australia) Fred Stolle | 6 | 7 | 11
12 | (Australia) John Newcombe | 1 | 5 | 9
(West Germany) Ingo Buding | 4 | 6 | 5 | 6 | 3
14 | (Australia) Tony Roche | 6 | 4 | 7 | 0 | 6
(France) Pierre Barthès | 4 | 4 | 4
2 | (Australia) Roy Emerson | 6 | 6 | 6

Semifinals
8 | (South Africa) Cliff Drysdale | 8 | 4 | 1 | 6 | 4
4 | (Australia) Fred Stolle | 6 | 6 | 6 | 4 | 6
14 | (Australia) Tony Roche | 6 | 6 | 3 | 6
2 | (Australia) Roy Emerson | 1 | 4 | 6 | 0

Final
4 | (Australia) Fred Stolle | 3 | 6 | 6 | 6
14 | (Australia) Tony Roche | 6 | 0 | 2 | 3

=== Earlier rounds ===
==== Section 1 ====
First round
16 | (United Kingdom) Sangster
(Hungary) Ádám-Stolpa
(Japan) Ishiguro | 4 | 6 | 3 | 4
(Soviet Union) Leius | 6 | 3 | 6 | 6
(Belgium) Hombergen | 6 | 1 | 2 | 3
(Socialist Federal Republic of Yugoslavia) Pilić | 2 | 6 | 6 | 6
(Chile) Pabst | 6 | 5 | 2 | 3
(Australia) Carmichael | 4 | 7 | 6 | 6

Second round
1 | (Spain) Santana
(Ecuador) Guzmán
(United States) Hoogs | 5 | 6 | 5 | 6 | 6
(Australia) Stone | 7 | 3 | 7 | 3 | 0
16 | (United Kingdom) Sangster | 3 | 2 | 1
(Soviet Union) Leius | 6 | 6 | 6
(Socialist Federal Republic of Yugoslavia) Pilić | 6 | 7 | 6 | 6
(Australia) Carmichael | 3 | 9 | 1 | 4

Third round
(Ecuador) Guzmán
(United States) Hoogs
(Soviet Union) Leius | 6 | 6 | 4 | 11
(Socialist Federal Republic of Yugoslavia) Pilić | 4 | 4 | 6 | 9

Fourth round
(United States) Hoogs | 3 | 3 | 6 | 10 | 7
(Soviet Union) Leius | 6 | 6 | 4 | 8 | 9

==== Section 2 ====
First round
(Chile) Aguirre | 2 | 4 | 5
8 | (South Africa) Drysdale | 6 | 6 | 7
(Australia) Stubs | 1 | 0 | 2
(Socialist Federal Republic of Yugoslavia) Jovanović | 6 | 6 | 6
(India) Lall | 0 | 7 | 3
(Japan) Konishi | 6 | 9 | 6
(United Kingdom) Taylor | 6 | 6 | 1 | 9
(Czechoslovakia) Holeček | 2 | 8 | 6 | 11
(United States) Werksman | 2 | 4 | 3
9 | (India) Krishnan | 6 | 6 | 6
(United Kingdom) Drobný | 5 | 1 | 1
(Italy) Palmieri | 7 | 6 | 6
(West Germany) Pawlik | 9 | 5 | 0
(Brazil) Koch | 11 | 7 | 6
(Australia) Sharpe | 5 | 4 | 3
(Poland) Gasiorek | 7 | 6 | 6

Second round
8 | (South Africa) Drysdale | 6 | 6 | 6
(Socialist Federal Republic of Yugoslavia) Jovanović | 2 | 1 | 1
(Japan) Konishi | 8 | 6 | 3 | 6
(Czechoslovakia) Holeček | 6 | 2 | 6 | 4
9 | (India) Krishnan | 6 | 6 | 6
(Italy) Palmieri | 3 | 1 | 1
(Brazil) Koch | 5 | 1 | 1
(Poland) Gasiorek | 7 | 6 | 6

Third round
8 | (South Africa) Drysdale | 6 | 6 | 7
(Japan) Konishi | 3 | 1 | 5
9 | (India) Krishnan | 6 | 6 | 6
(Poland) Gasiorek | 3 | 1 | 3

Fourth round
8 | (South Africa) Drysdale | 6 | 6 | 6
9 | (India) Krishnan | 2 | 2 | 0

==== Section 3 ====
First round
(Ecuador) Zuleta | 1 | 3 | 4
4 | (Australia) Stolle | 6 | 6 | 6
(France) Paul | 5 | 1 | 2
(Chile) Cornejo | 7 | 6 | 6
(Japan) Watanabe | 3 | 2 | 6 | 2
(Netherlands) Okker | 6 | 6 | 3 | 6
(France) Montrenaud | 4 | 4 | 3
(United States) Richey | 6 | 6 | 6
(Mexico) Zarazua | 5 | 2 | 1
13 | (Hungary) Gulyás | 7 | 6 | 6
(West Germany) Kuhnke | 3 | 4 | 3
(Spain) Arilla | 6 | 6 | 6
(Poland) Licis | 4 | 2 | 5
(Australia) Bowrey | 6 | 6 | 7
(Socialist Federal Republic of Yugoslavia) Špear
(Italy) Merlo

Second round
4 | (Australia) Stolle | 6 | 6 | 6
(Chile) Cornejo | 3 | 3 | 1
(Netherlands) Okker | 9 | 6 | 2 | 4 | 1
(United States) Richey | 7 | 3 | 6 | 6 | 6
13 | (Hungary) Gulyás | 4 | 4 | 6 | 6 | 4
(Spain) Arilla | 6 | 6 | 3 | 1 | 6
(Australia) Bowrey | 3 | 6 | 7 | 3 | 6
(Italy) Merlo | 6 | 4 | 5 | 6 | 3

Third round
4 | (Australia) Stolle | 6 | 4 | 6 | 6
(United States) Richey | 4 | 6 | 0 | 3
(Spain) Arilla | 8 | 1 | 6 | 6
(Australia) Bowrey | 6 | 6 | 0 | 4

Fourth round
4 | (Australia) Stolle | 7 | 6 | 3 | 6 | 6
(Spain) Arilla | 9 | 2 | 6 | 4 | 3

==== Section 4 ====
First round
(West Germany) Kreinberg | 1 | 5 | 2
5 | (France) Darmon | 6 | 7 | 6
(Denmark) Ulrich | 3 | 6 | 4 | 5
(Soviet Union) Metreveli | 6 | 2 | 6 | 7
(India) Misra | 0 | 8 | 4 | 3
(Australia) Howe | 6 | 6 | 6 | 6
(United Kingdom) Wooldridge | 1 | 1 | 6 | 4
(Greece) Kalogeropoulos | 6 | 6 | 4 | 6
(France) Duxin | 4 | 2 | 4
12 | (Australia) Newcombe | 6 | 6 | 6
(Venezuela) Pimentel | 6 | 0 | 0 | 6
(Italy) Bologna | 2 | 6 | 6 | 8
(Japan) Watanabe | 5 | 3 | 2
(France) Grinda | 7 | 6 | 6
(Spain) Gisbert | 0 | 6 | 6 | 4 | 4
(Colombia) Álvarez | 6 | 4 | 4 | 6 | 6

Second round
5 | (France) Darmon | 6 | 6 | 6
(Soviet Union) Metreveli | 4 | 3 | 1
(Australia) Howe | 7 | 3 | 6 | 2 | 6
(Greece) Kalogeropoulos | 5 | 6 | 2 | 6 | 8
12 | (Australia) Newcombe | 11 | 7 | 6
(Italy) Bologna | 9 | 5 | 2
(France) Grinda | 6 | 6 | 0 | 6
(Colombia) Álvarez | 3 | 4 | 6 | 4

Third round
5 | (France) Darmon | 6 | 4 | 6 | 2 | 7
(Greece) Kalogeropoulos | 2 | 6 | 2 | 6 | 5
12 | (Australia) Newcombe | 4 | 6 | 6 | 6
(France) Grinda | 6 | 4 | 1 | 2

Fourth round
5 | (France) Darmon | 3 | 8 | 0 | 3
12 | (Australia) Newcombe | 6 | 6 | 6 | 6

==== Section 5 ====
First round
(France) Bresson | 6 | 5 | 4
(Australia) Fletcher | 8 | 7 | 6
(Hungary) Komáromi | 3 | 4 | 4
(Belgium) De Gronckel | 6 | 6 | 6
(Chile) Pinto Bravo | 6 | 6 | 3 | 6 | 1
(France) Barclay | 0 | 8 | 6 | 1 | 6
(Japan) Fujii | 5 | 0 | 1
11 | (United States) Froehling | 7 | 6 | 6
(Australia) Kelso | 1 | 6 | 1
(West Germany) Buding | 6 | 8 | 6
(France) Pilet | 6 | 3 | 8 | 6 | 3
(Switzerland) Sturdza | 3 | 6 | 10 | 2 | 6
(South Africa) Sanders | 6 | 7 | 2 | 8 | 1
(New Zealand) Gerrard | 0 | 5 | 6 | 10 | 6
(Israel) Davidman
6 | (Australia) Mulligan

Second round
(Australia) Fletcher | 6 | 6 | 6 | 6
(Belgium) De Gronckel | 3 | 8 | 1 | 0
(France) Barclay | 5 | 2 | 6 | 6 | 7
11 | (United States) Froehling | 7 | 6 | 1 | 2 | 5
(West Germany) Buding | 6 | 6 | 8
(Switzerland) Sturdza | 1 | 3 | 6
(New Zealand) Gerrard | 6 | 1 | 3 | 2
6 | (Australia) Mulligan | 1 | 6 | 6 | 6

Third round
(Australia) Fletcher | 4 | 7 | 8 | 6
(France) Barclay | 6 | 5 | 6 | 1
(West Germany) Buding | 6 | 2 | 5 | 6 | 6
6 | (Australia) Mulligan | 4 | 6 | 7 | 3 | 4

Fourth round
(Australia) Fletcher | 6 | 5 | 8 | 3
(West Germany) Buding | 4 | 7 | 10 | 6

==== Section 6 ====
First round
(South Africa) Maud | 4 | 1 | 2
(Brazil) Mandarino | 6 | 6 | 6
(Belgium) Drossart | 1 | 1 | 6 | 1
(United States) Dell | 6 | 6 | 3 | 6
(South Africa) Moore | 0 | 4 | 1
(France) Jauffret | 6 | 6 | 6
(Hungary) Szikszai | 4 | 5 | 6 | 5
14 | (Australia) Roche | 6 | 7 | 4 | 7
(Australia) Ruffels | 7 | 7 | 5 | 6 | 2
(Rhodesia) Dowdeswell | 5 | 9 | 7 | 2 | 6
(Chile) Rodríguez | 6 | 10 | 3 | 5 | 2
(Czechoslovakia) Javorský | 4 | 8 | 6 | 7 | 6
(South Africa) Zeeman | 2 | 4 | 3
(France) Contet | 6 | 6 | 6
(France) Jalabert | 2 | 6 | 0 | 5
3 | (Italy) Pietrangeli | 6 | 3 | 6 | 7

Second round
(Brazil) Mandarino | 6 | 6 | 6
(United States) Dell | 1 | 1 | 3
(France) Jauffret | 1 | 0 | 7 | 4
14 | (Australia) Roche | 6 | 6 | 5 | 6
(Rhodesia) Dowdeswell | 4 | 4 | 4
(Czechoslovakia) Javorský | 6 | 6 | 6
(France) Contet | 4 | 5 | 1
3 | (Italy) Pietrangeli | 6 | 7 | 6

Third round
(Brazil) Mandarino | 2 | 2 | 4
14 | (Australia) Roche | 6 | 6 | 6
(Czechoslovakia) Javorský | 3 | 0 | 6 | 6 | 3
3 | (Italy) Pietrangeli | 6 | 6 | 0 | 1 | 6

Fourth round
14 | (Australia) Roche | 4 | 7 | 10 | 6
3 | (Italy) Pietrangeli | 6 | 5 | 8 | 3

==== Section 7 ====
First round
(Australia) Davidson | 4 | 3 | 5
(Romania) Țiriac | 6 | 6 | 7
(Italy) Majoli
(France) Leclercq
(Czechoslovakia) Koudelka | 3 | 3 | 1
10 | (South Africa) Diepraam | 6 | 6 | 6
(Morocco) Lahcen Chaldi | 2 | 0 | 3
(France) Barthès | 6 | 6 | 6
(West Germany) Elschenbroich | 0 | 7 | 9 | 1 | 6
(South Africa) Hewitt | 6 | 5 | 7 | 6 | 8
(Rhodesia) Stilwell
(France) Vallée
(Poland) Orlikowski | 1 | 4 | 1
7 | (Australia) Fraser | 6 | 6 | 6
(Italy) Tacchini | 4 | 6 | 3 | 6
(Mexico) Osuna | 6 | 1 | 6 | 8

Second round
(Romania) Țiriac | 6 | 8 | 6 | 6
(France) Leclercq | 3 | 10 | 4 | 0
10 | (South Africa) Diepraam | 3 | 4 | 5
(France) Barthes | 6 | 6 | 7
(South Africa) Hewitt | 6 | 6 | 6
(France) Vallée | 1 | 3 | 3
7 | (Australia) Fraser | 2 | 6 | 6 | 3 | 6
(Mexico) Osuna | 6 | 3 | 4 | 6 | 8

Third round
(Romania) Țiriac | 5 | 3 | 2
(France) Barthès | 7 | 6 | 6
(South Africa) Hewitt | 6 | 6 | 6
(Mexico) Osuna | 4 | 3 | 2

Fourth round
(France) Barthès | 6 | 4 | 6 | 6
(South Africa) Hewitt | 3 | 6 | 4 | 3

==== Section 8 ====
First round
(Tunisia) Belkhodja | 3 | 3 | 6 | 6 | 4
(South Africa) McMillan | 6 | 6 | 1 | 1 | 6
(United States) Lenoir | 1 | 2 | 0
(Spain) Couder | 6 | 6 | 6
(Australia) Cooper | 5 | 2 | 2
15 | (India) Mukerjea | 7 | 6 | 6
(United Kingdom) Stilwell | 2 | 6 | 6 | 6 | 3
(Brazil) Barnes | 6 | 4 | 8 | 4 | 6

Second round
(South Africa) McMillan | 6 | 4 | 6 | 6 | 3
(Spain) Couder | 8 | 6 | 3 | 3 | 6
15 | (India) Mukerjea | 7 | 6 | 6 | 6
(Brazil) Barnes | 5 | 4 | 8 | 4
(United States) Fox | 6 | 2 | 2 | 2
(United Kingdom) Knight | 0 | 6 | 6 | 6
(Italy) Di Maso | 2 | 1 | 0
2 | (Australia) Emerson | 6 | 6 | 6

Third round
(Spain) Couder | 4 | 6 | 4 | 2
15 | (India) Mukerjea | 6 | 2 | 6 | 6
(United Kingdom) Knight | 8 | 6 | 6
2 | (Australia) Emerson | 10 | 8 | 8

Fourth round
15 | (India) Mukerjea | 6 | 4 | 3 | 2
2 | (Australia) Emerson | 4 | 6 | 6 | 6

| Preceded by 1965 Australian Championships – Men's singles | Grand Slam men's singles | Succeeded by 1965 Wimbledon Championships – Men's singles |
