= 1967 French Championships – Men's singles =

Men's singles
- 1967 French Championships

Final
- Champion: (Australia) Roy Emerson
- Runner-up: (Australia) Tony Roche
- Score: 6–1, 6–4, 2–6, 6–2

Details
- Draw: 124
- Seeds: 16

Events
Singles	men	women
Doubles	men	women
- French Championships

In the last French Championships edition before Open Era that started in 1968, first-seeded Roy Emerson defeated Tony Roche 6–1, 6–4, 2–6, 6–2 in the final to win the men's singles tennis title at the 1967 French Championships.

Emerson became the first man in history to win a Double Career Grand Slam. This would be equalled by Rod Laver at the 1969 US Open, by Novak Djokovic at the 2021 French Open, and by Rafael Nadal at the 2022 Australian Open.

== Seeds ==
The seeded players are listed below. Roy Emerson is the champion; others show the round in which they were eliminated.

1. (Australia) Roy Emerson (champion)
2. (Australia) Tony Roche (final)
3. (Australia) John Newcombe (fourth round)
4. (Italy) Nicola Pietrangeli (third round)
5. (Hungary) István Gulyás (semifinals)
6. (Australia) Martin Mulligan (fourth round)
7. (Soviet Union) Alexander Metreveli (third round)
8. (France) Pierre Darmon (quarterfinals)
9. (South Africa) Bob Hewitt (fourth round)
10. (South Africa) Cliff Drysdale (quarterfinals)
11. (Netherlands) Tom Okker (quarterfinals)
12. (Australia) Bill Bowrey (second round)
13. (Australia) Owen Davidson (quarterfinals)
14. (Socialist Federal Republic of Yugoslavia) Nikola Pilić (semifinals)
15. (Czechoslovakia) Jan Kodeš (fourth round)
16. (India) Jaidip Mukerjea (first round)

== Draw ==
=== Key ===
- Q = Qualifier
- WC = Wild card
- LL = Lucky loser
- r = Retired

=== Finals ===
Quarterfinals
1	(Australia) Roy Emerson	6	6	6
8	(France) Pierre Darmon	0	4	4
13	(Australia) Owen Davidson	7	3	3	0
5	(Hungary) István Gulyás	5	6	6	6
11	(Netherlands) Tom Okker	3	9	2
14	(Socialist Federal Republic of Yugoslavia) Nikola Pilić	6	11	6
10	(South Africa) Cliff Drysdale	6	6	3	2	4
2	(Australia) Tony Roche	2	2	6	6	6

Semifinals
1	(Australia) Roy Emerson	6	6	6
5	(Hungary) István Gulyás	3	4	2
14	(Socialist Federal Republic of Yugoslavia) Nikola Pilić	6	3	4	6	4
2	(Australia) Tony Roche	3	6	6	2	6

Final
1	(Australia) Roy Emerson	6	6	2	6
2	(Australia) Tony Roche	1	4	6	2

=== Earlier rounds ===
==== Section 1 ====
First round
(Brazil) Gentil
(Poland) Licis
(France) Béraud	6	1	5	1
(Socialist Federal Republic of Yugoslavia) Jovanović	2	6	7	6
16	(India) Mukerjea	6	4	1
(South Africa) McMillan	8	6	6
(Spain) Gisbert	6	4	6	6
(France) Courcol	4	6	2	4
(Italy) Merlo	3	6	2	6
(Soviet Union) Egorov	6	2	6	8
(Canada) Puddicombe
(West Germany) Weinmann

Second round
1	(Australia) Emerson	7	2	6	6
(Colombia) Molina	5	6	4	1
(Brazil) Gentil	1	2	2
(Socialist Federal Republic of Yugoslavia) Jovanović	6	6	6
(South Africa) McMillan	7	8	6	5	6
(Spain) Gisbert	9	6	3	7	4
(Soviet Union) Egorov	6	6	5	4	6
(Canada) Puddicombe	4	4	7	6	4

Third round
1	(Australia) Emerson	6	6	6	6
(Socialist Federal Republic of Yugoslavia) Jovanović	8	4	3	1
(South Africa) McMillan	7	2	7
(Soviet Union) Egorov	9	6	9

Fourth round
1	(Australia) Emerson	6	6	6
(Soviet Union) Egorov	3	2	2

==== Section 2 ====
First round
8	(France) Darmon	6	6	6
(India) Venkatesan	2	0	1
(United States) Tym	5	6	4	4
(Japan) Mori	7	4	6	6
(West Germany) Gottschalk
(Australia) Ruffels
(Italy) Majoli	6	7	7
(South Africa) Moore	2	5	5
9	(South Africa) Hewitt	6	6	6
(Ecuador) Zuleta	1	0	3
(France) Chanfreau	9	6	0	6
(Poland) Nowicki	7	4	6	4
(Greece) Kalogeropoulos	6	6	6
(Italy) Bartoni	2	2	2
(Hungary) Baranyi	1	5	6
(Australia) Stone	6	7	8

Second round
8	(France) Darmon	6	6	6
(Japan) Mori	3	0	3
(Australia) Ruffels	0	6	6	2	7
(Italy) Majoli	6	2	4	6	5
9	(South Africa) Hewitt	6	6	6
(France) Chanfreau	2	1	1
(Greece) Kalogeropoulos	5	6	6	6
(Australia) Stone	7	1	4	2

Third round
8	(France) Darmon	6	6	8
(Australia) Ruffels	3	2	6
9	(South Africa) Hewitt	6	6	4	6	6
(Greece) Kalogeropoulos	8	2	6	1	2

Fourth round
8	(France) Darmon	6	6	6
9	(South Africa) Hewitt	2	3	0

==== Section 3 ====
First round
4	(Italy) Pietrangeli
(Australia) Candy
(France) Jauffret
(Belgium) Drossart
(Japan) Konishi	6	6	10
(Australia) Carmichael	4	4	8
(Canada) Carpenter	8	3	3	3
(Poland) Gasiorek	6	6	6	6
13	(Australia) Davidson
(Sweden) Folke
(Italy) Di Maso	6	21	3	2	6
(France) Leclercq	2	19	6	6	3
(Socialist Federal Republic of Yugoslavia) Franulović
(Spain) Couder
(United Kingdom) Curtis	2	6	9	4
(Chile) Cornejo	6	4	11	6

Second round
4	(Italy) Pietrangeli	6	7	5	6
(Belgium) Drossart	3	5	7	2
(Japan) Konishi	4	5	2
(Poland) Gasiorek	6	7	6
13	(Australia) Davidson	1	6	6	6
(Italy) Di Maso	6	2	1	2
(Spain) Couder	4	2	3
(Chile) Cornejo	6	6	6

Third round
4	(Italy) Pietrangeli	3	5	3
(Poland) Gasiorek	6	7	6
13	(Australia) Davidson	8	1	7	4	6
(Chile) Cornejo	6	6	5	6	3

Fourth round
(Poland) Gasiorek	7	6	6	4	2
13	(Australia) Davidson	5	0	8	6	6

==== Section 4 ====
First round
5	(Hungary) Gulyás	6	6	6
(Australia) Cooper	1	0	4
(Chile) Rodríguez	6	6	6
(Italy) Mennella	3	4	4
(France) Goven	4	8	6	4
(West Germany) Elschenbroich	6	10	4	6
(United Kingdom) Hutchins	4	4	1
(Japan) Yanagi	6	6	6
12	(Australia) Bowrey	7	6	6
(Japan) Watanabe	5	0	4
(Italy) Crotta	6	6	6	0	4
(Soviet Union) Ivanov	4	1	8	6	6
(Sweden) Bengtson
(Socialist Federal Republic of Yugoslavia) Špear
(France) Rouyer	6	6	6
(United Kingdom) Battrick	2	4	4

Second round
5	(Hungary) Gulyás	6	6	6
(Chile) Rodríguez	3	0	4
(West Germany) Elschenbroich	6	6	6
(Japan) Yanagi	3	4	1
12	(Australia) Bowrey	2	6	2	4
(Soviet Union) Ivanov	6	3	6	6
(Socialist Federal Republic of Yugoslavia) Špear	6	6	6
(France) Rouyer	3	4	2

Third round
5	(Hungary) Gulyás	6	6	6
(West Germany) Elschenbroich	1	3	2
(Soviet Union) Ivanov	6	3	1	4
(Socialist Federal Republic of Yugoslavia) Špear	4	6	6	6

Fourth round
5	(Hungary) Gulyás	4	6	6	6
(Socialist Federal Republic of Yugoslavia) Špear	6	2	3	3

==== Section 5 ====
First round
(United Kingdom) Stilwell	3	6	7	6
(Australia) Cottrill	6	1	5	3
(Sweden) Andersson
(Soviet Union) Likhachev
(Australia) Stubs	1	6	6	2	6
(France) Paul	6	2	3	6	3
(Chile) Aguirre	2	3	4
11	(Netherlands) Okker	6	6	6
(Australia) Keldie	3	2	1
(France) Jauffret	6	6	6
(Australia) Crealy	6	4	1	2
(Czechoslovakia) Koudelka	3	6	6	6
(United Kingdom) Matthews	2	7	6	6
(Romania) Mărmureanu	6	5	4	4
(France) Loliée	1	1	2
6	(Australia) Mulligan	6	6	6

Second round
(United Kingdom) Stilwell	6	6	4	4	4
(Soviet Union) Likhachev	2	4	6	6	6
(Australia) Stubs	1	2	1
11	(Netherlands) Okker	6	6	6
(France) Jauffret	6	1	6	6
(Czechoslovakia) Koudelka	0	6	1	3
(United Kingdom) Matthews	2	5	4
6	(Australia) Mulligan	6	7	6

Third round
(Soviet Union) Likhachev	3	2	1
11	(Netherlands) Okker	6	6	6
(France) Jauffret	4	3	6	4
6	(Australia) Mulligan	6	6	4	6

Fourth round
11	(Netherlands) Okker	6	7	6
6	(Australia) Mulligan	4	5	2

==== Section 6 ====
First round
(India) Krishnan	6	6	8
(Australia) Brown	2	4	6
(Poland) Lewandowski	4	3	6	4
(Czechoslovakia) Kukal	6	6	4	6
(Hungary) Szőke
(France) Barclay
(Italy) Bologna	2	2	3
14	(Socialist Federal Republic of Yugoslavia) Pilić	6	6	6
(West Germany) Plötz
(Belgium) De Gronckel
(Italy) Tacchini
(Romania) Țiriac
(Japan) Kobayashi	4	6	6	3	1
(France) Montrenaud	6	4	1	6	6
(Italy) Palmieri	6	2	0	4
3	(Australia) Newcombe	2	6	6	6

Second round
(India) Krishnan	8	6	6
(Czechoslovakia) Kukal	6	2	3
(Hungary) Szőke	1	2	3
14	(Socialist Federal Republic of Yugoslavia) Pilić	6	6	6
(Belgium) De Gronckel	2	3	2
(Romania) Țiriac	6	6	6
(France) Montrenaud	5	3	4
3	(Australia) Newcombe	7	6	6

Third round
(India) Krishnan	3	6	1
14	(Socialist Federal Republic of Yugoslavia) Pilić	6	8	6
(Romania) Țiriac	3	6	2	6	3
3	(Australia) Newcombe	6	3	6	4	6

Fourth round
14	(Socialist Federal Republic of Yugoslavia) Pilić	6	6	6
3	(Australia) Newcombe	4	3	2

==== Section 7 ====
First round
(United Kingdom) Clifton	12	6	9	6
(Belgium) Hombergen	14	4	7	1
(France) Beust	7	6	2	8	2
(Australia) Fletcher	5	3	6	10	6
(United Kingdom) Barrett	2	4	7	6	5
(Hungary) Komáromi	6	6	5	4	7
(Italy) Gilardelli	2	5	4
10	(South Africa) Drysdale	6	7	6
(India) Lall	7	2	3	3
(Czechoslovakia) Holeček	5	6	6	6
(Brazil) Barnes	7	8	6
(Japan) Watanabe	5	6	3
(Colombia) Álvarez	6	2	3	4
(Hungary) Szikszay	3	6	6	6
(Sweden) Ölander	5	2	5
7	(Soviet Union) Metreveli	7	6	7

Second round
(United Kingdom) Clifton	0	2	4
(Australia) Fletcher	6	6	6
(Hungary) Komáromi	7	6	6	4
10	(South Africa) Drysdale	9	8	4	6
(Czechoslovakia) Holeček	7	6	6	4	9
(Brazil) Barnes	5	4	8	6	7
(Hungary) Szikszay	1	6	1	2
7	(Soviet Union) Metreveli	6	4	6	6

Third round
(Australia) Fletcher	5	6	0	5
10	(South Africa) Drysdale	7	1	6	7
(Czechoslovakia) Holeček	6	6	6
7	(Soviet Union) Metreveli	2	4	3

Fourth round
10	(South Africa) Drysdale	6	6	6
(Czechoslovakia) Holeček	4	3	3

==== Section 8 ====
First round
(Ecuador) Guzmán
(France) Contet
(Romania) Năstase	7	0	7	6
(Australia) Howe	5	6	5	4
(West Germany) Buding	6	6	7
(Chile) Pinto Bravo	4	2	5
(South Africa) Maud	1	2	1
15	(Czechoslovakia) Kodeš	6	6	6
(South Africa) Summers	5	1	0
(Denmark) Ulrich	7	6	6
(Monaco) Landau	3	2	3
(Socialist Federal Republic of Yugoslavia) Mincek	6	6	6

Second round
(France) Contet	6	6	4	1	3
(Romania) Năstase	4	2	6	6	6
(West Germany) Buding	7	3	3
15	(Czechoslovakia) Kodeš	9	6	6
(Denmark) Ulrich	1	8	6	6
(Socialist Federal Republic of Yugoslavia) Mincek	6	6	0	2
(Japan) Koura	3	2	3
2	(Australia) Roche	6	6	6

Third round
(Romania) Năstase	4	5	3
15	(Czechoslovakia) Kodeš	6	7	6
(Denmark) Ulrich	3	2	4
2	(Australia) Roche	6	6	6

Fourth round
15	(Czechoslovakia) Kodeš	4	2	10	6	4
2	(Australia) Roche	6	6	8	2	6

Preceded by 1967 Australian Championships – Men's singles	Grand Slam men's singles	Succeeded by 1967 Wimbledon Championships – Men's singles
