= 1967 Wimbledon Championships – Men's singles =

Men's singles
- 1967 Wimbledon Championships

Final
- Champion: (Australia) John Newcombe
- Runner-up: (West Germany) Wilhelm Bungert
- Score: 6–3, 6–1, 6–1

Details
- Draw: 128 (10 Q )
- Seeds: 8

Events
Singles	men	women		boys	girls
Doubles	men	women	mixed	boys	girls
← 1966 ·	Wimbledon Championships	· 1968 →

John Newcombe defeated Wilhelm Bungert in the final, 6–3, 6–1, 6–1 to win the gentlemen's singles tennis title at the 1967 Wimbledon Championships. Manuel Santana was the defending champion, but lost in the first round to Charlie Pasarell.

== Seeds ==
1. (Spain) Manuel Santana (first round)
2. (Australia) Roy Emerson (fourth round)
3. (Australia) John Newcombe (champion)
4. (Australia) Tony Roche (second round)
5. (South Africa) Cliff Drysdale (fourth round)
6. (Australia) Ken Fletcher (quarterfinals)
7. (Denmark) Jan Leschly (second round)
8. (Australia) Bill Bowrey (third round)

Click on the seed number of a player to go to their draw section.

== Draw ==
=== Key ===
- Q = Qualifier
- WC = Wild card
- LL = Lucky loser
- Alt = Alternate
- ITF = ITF entry
- PR = Protected ranking
- SR = Special ranking
- SE = Special exempt
- JE = Junior exempt
- JR = Junior Accelerator Programme entrant
- CO = College Accelerator Programme entrant
- NG = Next Gen Accelerator Program entrant
- w/o = Walkover
- r = Retired
- d = Defaulted

=== Finals ===
Quarterfinals
(Brazil) Thomaz Koch	4	6	6	1	3
(West Germany) Wilhelm Bungert	6	4	4	6	6
(Australia) Ray Ruffels	4	6	4
(United Kingdom) Roger Taylor	6	8	6
6	(Australia) Ken Fletcher	4	2	4
3	(Australia) John Newcombe	6	6	6
(Australia) John Cooper	12	10	4	2
(Socialist Federal Republic of Yugoslavia) Nikola Pilić	14	8	6	6

Semifinals
(West Germany) Wilhelm Bungert	6	6	2	6	6
(United Kingdom) Roger Taylor	4	8	6	4	4
3	(Australia) John Newcombe	9	4	6	6
(Socialist Federal Republic of Yugoslavia) Nikola Pilić	7	6	3	4

Final
(West Germany) Wilhelm Bungert	3	1	1
3	(Australia) John Newcombe	6	6	6

=== Top half ===
==== Section 1 ====
First round
1	(Spain) Manuel Santana	8	3	6	6
(United States) Charlie Pasarell	10	6	2	8
Q	(South Africa) Graydon Garner	6	4	4
(South Africa) Bob Hewitt	8	6	6
(Japan) Keishiro Yanagi	6	6	8
(Poland) Wiesław Gąsiorek	4	1	6
Q	(Canada) Frank Tutvin	3	6	6	6
(Italy) Sergio Tacchini	6	1	3	4
(Brazil) Thomaz Koch	6	13	6
(Czechoslovakia) Jan Kukal	4	11	4
(Sweden) Lars Ölander	6	5	3	6	2
(Hungary) István Gulyás	4	7	6	4	6
(United Kingdom) John Barrett	6	4	1	6	8
(France) Bernard Montrenaud	3	6	6	3	6
(Australia) Colin Stubs	1	5	6	7	6
(Denmark) Torben Ulrich	6	7	2	5	2

Second round
(United States) C Pasarell	6	6	6	6
(South Africa) R Hewitt	3	8	2	4
(Japan) K Yanagi	1	7	6	4
Q	(Canada) F Tutvin	6	9	2	6
(Brazil) T Koch	6	6	6
(Hungary) I Gulyás	2	2	2
(United Kingdom) J Barrett	10	5	0
(Australia) C Stubs	12	7	6

Third round
(United States) C Pasarell	6	6	6
Q	(Canada) F Tutvin	1	3	1
(Brazil) T Koch	6	6	6
(Australia) C Stubs	1	3	2

Fourth round
(United States) C Pasarell	4	6	6	4	6
(Brazil) T Koch	6	4	3	6	8

==== Section 2 ====
First round
8	(Australia) Bill Bowrey	8	6	6
(France) Patrice Beust	6	4	3
(Soviet Union) Toomas Leius	6	6	6
(Poland) Andrzej Licis	3	2	4
(United Kingdom) John Clifton	4	4	3
(United Kingdom) Bobby Wilson	6	6	6
(Australia) Bob Carmichael	6	6	6
(South Africa) Frew McMillan	2	3	4
(Socialist Federal Republic of Yugoslavia) Boro Jovanović	4	4	5
(South Africa) Abe Segal	6	6	7
(United States) Donald Dell	4	10	3	5
(United States) Gene Scott	6	8	6	7
(United States) Frank Froehling	6	6	6
(Switzerland) Dimitri Sturdza	4	4	2
Q	(Australia) Ray Wilson	6	6	5
(West Germany) Wilhelm Bungert	8	8	7

Second round
8	(Australia) W Bowrey	4	13	6	6
(Soviet Union) T Leius	6	11	2	2
(United Kingdom) R Wilson	6	8	4	6	6
(Australia) R Carmichael	3	10	6	4	4
(South Africa) A Segal	6	4	6	6
(United States) E Scott	4	6	4	3
(United States) F Froehling	8	3	6	6	5
(West Germany) W Bungert	10	6	1	3	7

Third round
8	(Australia) W Bowrey	6	5	6	3	2
(United Kingdom) R Wilson	4	7	4	6	6
(South Africa) A Segal	2	6	2	3
(West Germany) W Bungert	6	3	6	6

Fourth round
(United Kingdom) R Wilson	6	7	1	5	7
(West Germany) W Bungert	1	5	6	7	9

==== Section 3 ====
First round
4	(Australia) Tony Roche	4	6	6	8
(Czechoslovakia) Jan Kodeš	6	1	2	6
(United States) Cliff Richey	6	6	6
(Brazil) Ronnie Barnes	2	4	2
(Hungary) András Szikszay	1	7	4
(West Germany) Ingo Buding	6	9	6
(Australia) Ray Ruffels	6	9	6
(United Kingdom) Gerald Battrick	1	7	4
(Belgium) Patrick Hombergen	2	5	0
(Japan) Koji Watanabe	6	7	6
(Italy) Gaetano Di Maso	2	1	4
(Romania) Ion Țiriac	6	6	6
(Australia) John Cottrill	6	2	7	6
(Socialist Federal Republic of Yugoslavia) Željko Franulović	4	6	5	4
LL	(Australia) Graham Primrose	3	8	6	3
(France) Daniel Contet	6	10	4	6

Second round
4	(Australia) A Roche	6	6	17	12	3
(United States) C Richey	3	3	19	14	6
(West Germany) I Buding	2	2	5
(Australia) R Ruffels	6	6	7
(Japan) K Watanabe	5	4	7
(Romania) I Țiriac	7	6	9
(Australia) J Cottrill	3	6	1
(France) D Contet	6	8	6

Third round
(United States) C Richey	4	2	4
(Australia) R Ruffels	6	6	6
(Romania) I Țiriac	6	6	6
(France) D Contet	4	1	2

Fourth round
(Australia) R Ruffels	9	6	6
(Romania) I Țiriac	7	3	4

==== Section 4 ====
First round
5	(South Africa) Cliff Drysdale	8	6	6
(United Kingdom) Stanley Matthews	6	3	4
Q	(South Africa) Rohan Summers	2	4	5
(United Kingdom) Graham Stilwell	6	6	7
(Australia) Bob Howe	6	7	9	2
(Netherlands) Jan Hajer	8	5	11	6
(Australia) Ronald McKenzie	6	2	6	6	3
(India) Jaidip Mukerjea	2	6	4	8	6
Q	(United States) Chauncey Steele	1	2	1
(United Kingdom) Roger Taylor	6	6	6
(Australia) Martin Mulligan	6	10	6
(Soviet Union) Vladimir Korotkov	2	8	1
Q	(United Kingdom) Clay Iles	4	6	5	5
(Finland) Pekka Säilä	6	4	7	7
Q	(Japan) Ryoichi Mori	6	2	1	7
(Chile) Patricio Cornejo	4	6	6	9

Second round
5	(South Africa) C Drysdale	6	6	6
(United Kingdom) G Stilwell	1	2	3
(Netherlands) J Hajer	6	8	0	1	3
(India) J Mukerjea	3	6	6	6	6
(United Kingdom) R Taylor	6	6	6
(Australia) M Mulligan	1	2	4
(Finland) P Säilä	5	11	6	11	6
(Chile) P Cornejo	7	9	4	13	4

Third round
5	(South Africa) C Drysdale	6	6	6
(India) J Mukerjea	3	4	3
(United Kingdom) R Taylor	6	6	6
(Finland) P Säilä	2	1	3

Fourth round
5	(South Africa) C Drysdale	6	9	4	6	4
(United Kingdom) R Taylor	3	11	6	4	6

=== Bottom half ===
==== Section 5 ====
First round
(United States) Vic Seixas	6	6	3	6
(Denmark) Jørgen Ulrich	3	4	6	3
(Italy) Giordano Maioli	6	6	6
(Czechoslovakia) Jiří Javorský	2	1	4
(United States) John Pickens	3	5	6	3
(West Germany) Hans-Joachim Plötz	6	7	3	6
(United States) Bob Lutz	12	9	6	4
Q	(New Zealand) Onny Parun	14	11	3	6
(Australia) Terry Addison	5	6	2
(United Kingdom) Mike Sangster	7	8	6
(India) Premjit Lall	6	6	6
(Ecuador) Pancho Guzmán	1	4	0
(Australia) Owen Davidson	8	7	6
(South Africa) Ray Moore	6	5	4
(United States) Bill Hoogs	0	3	6
6	(Australia) Ken Fletcher	6	6	8

Second round
(United States) V Seixas	1	6	9	2	2
(Italy) G Maioli	6	2	7	6	6
(West Germany) H-J Plötz	7	14	9
Q	(New Zealand) O Parun	5	12	7
(United Kingdom) M Sangster	6	6	9	16
(India) P Lall	8	4	7	14
(Australia) O Davidson	5	2	1
6	(Australia) K Fletcher	7	6	6

Third round
(Italy) G Maioli	4	5	6	3
(West Germany) H-J Plötz	6	7	3	6
(United Kingdom) M Sangster	10	9	3
6	(Australia) K Fletcher	12	11	6

Fourth round
(West Germany) H-J Plötz	1	6	3	0
6	(Australia) K Fletcher	6	3	6	6

==== Section 6 ====
First round
(Chile) Patricio Rodríguez	4	6	4	4
(Sweden) Ove Bengtson	6	3	6	6
(United States) Clark Graebner	6	6	6
(Socialist Federal Republic of Yugoslavia) Nikola Špear	3	1	1
(West Germany) Bernd Weinmann	4	4	6	1
(Brazil) José Edison Mandarino	6	6	4	6
(Netherlands) Tom Okker	6	6	6
(United Kingdom) Keith Wooldridge	0	1	2
(Mexico) Rafael Osuna	6	11	12
(Japan) Ichizo Konishi	4	9	10
(United States) Stan Smith	10	6	6
(Spain) José María Gisbert	8	4	4
(Soviet Union) Alex Metreveli	6	8	3	6	4
(New Zealand) Brian Fairlie	1	6	6	8	6
(France) François Jauffret	2	8	3
3	(Australia) John Newcombe	6	10	6

Second round
(Sweden) O Bengtson	1	4	3
(United States) C Graebner	6	6	6
(Brazil) JE Mandarino	6	0	6	4	6
(Netherlands) T Okker	1	6	4	6	4
(Mexico) R Osuna	4	5	3
(United States) S Smith	6	7	6
(New Zealand) B Fairlie	4	4	2
3	(Australia) J Newcombe	6	6	6

Third round
(United States) C Graebner	6	6	11
(Brazil) JE Mandarino	3	3	9
(United States) S Smith	4	6	4	3
3	(Australia) J Newcombe	6	4	6	6

Fourth round
(United States) C Graebner	15	3	4
3	(Australia) J Newcombe	17	6	6

==== Section 7 ====
First round
(Australia) Dick Crealy	6	2	6	6
(Jamaica) Richard Russell	3	6	3	4
(Italy) Nicola Pietrangeli	6	6	4	4	6
(United Kingdom) Mark Cox	4	4	6	6	4
(Czechoslovakia) Milan Holeček	6	4	6	3	4
(France) Jean-Baptiste Chanfreau	2	6	1	6	6
(Soviet Union) Sergei Likhachev	6	6	6
Q	(Iran) Taghi Akbari	3	3	0
(Australia) John Cooper	6	6	0	6
(West Germany) Harald Elschenbroich	2	4	6	4
(France) Michel Leclercq	4	4	6	13	6
(Chile) Jaime Pinto Bravo	6	6	4	11	4
(India) Ramanathan Krishnan	6	4	3	6
(United States) Marty Riessen	4	6	6	8
(Spain) José Luis Arilla	3	2	1
7	(Denmark) Jan Leschly	6	6	6

Second round
(Australia) R Crealy	8	6	6
(Italy) N Pietrangeli	6	3	4
(France) J-B Chanfreau	4	4	3
(Soviet Union) S Likhachev	6	6	6
(Australia) J Cooper	4	6	6	6
(France) M Leclercq	6	4	3	4
(United States) M Riessen	1	6	3	6	6
7	(Denmark) J Leschly	6	3	6	1	4

Third round
(Australia) R Crealy	8	4	2
(Soviet Union) S Likhachev	10	6	6
(Australia) J Cooper	11	6	11	8
(United States) M Riessen	9	3	13	6

Fourth round
(Soviet Union) S Likhachev	4	3	1
(Australia) J Cooper	6	6	6

==== Section 8 ====
First round
(United Kingdom) Paul Hutchins	4	4	1
(France) Pierre Darmon	6	6	6
(Greece) Nicholas Kalogeropoulos	6	7	6
(Hungary) Péter Szőke	2	5	4
(Socialist Federal Republic of Yugoslavia) Nikola Pilić	6	14	7	6
(United States) Jim McManus	8	12	5	2
(Australia) Ray Keldie	4	9	0
Q	(India) Shyam Minotra	6	11	6
(South Africa) Bob Maud	3	2	6	6	6
(United States) Jim Osborne	6	6	3	2	4
(Australia) Allan Stone	1	3	3
(South Africa) Jack Saul	6	6	6
(United Kingdom) Peter Curtis	6	6	6
(Romania) Ilie Năstase	4	4	2
(Canada) Keith Carpenter	3	3	2
2	(Australia) Roy Emerson	6	6	6

Second round
(France) P Darmon	7	6	5	6
(Greece) N Kalogeropoulos	5	2	7	3
(Socialist Federal Republic of Yugoslavia) N Pilić	6	6	6
Q	(India) S Minotra	3	2	1
(South Africa) R Maud	6	6	6
(South Africa) J Saul	4	4	4
(United Kingdom) P Curtis	5	3	4
2	(Australia) R Emerson	7	6	6

Third round
(France) P Darmon	2	8	2	3
(Socialist Federal Republic of Yugoslavia) N Pilić	6	6	6	6
(South Africa) R Maud	3	7	4
2	(Australia) R Emerson	6	9	6

Fourth round
(Socialist Federal Republic of Yugoslavia) N Pilić	6	5	6	6
2	(Australia) R Emerson	4	7	3	4

Preceded by 1967 French Championships	Grand Slams; Men's Singles	Succeeded by 1967 U.S. Championships
