= 1965 Wimbledon Championships – Boys' singles =

Boys' singles
- 1965 Wimbledon Championships

Final
- Champion: (Soviet Union) Vladimir Korotkov
- Runner-up: (France) Georges Goven
- Score: 6–2, 3–6, 6–2

Events
Singles	men	women		boys	girls
Doubles	men	women	mixed	boys	girls
- Wimbledon Championships

Vladimir Korotkov defeated Georges Goven in the final, 6–2, 3–6, 6–2 to win the boys' singles tennis title at the 1965 Wimbledon Championships.

== Draw ==
Key

- Q = Qualifier
- WC = Wild card
- LL = Lucky loser
- Alt = Alternate
- ITF = ITF entry
- PR = Protected ranking
- SR = Special ranking
- SE = Special exempt
- JE = Junior exempt
- JR = Junior Accelerator Programme entrant
- CO = College Accelerator Programme entrant
- NG = Next Gen Accelerator Program entrant
- w/o = Walkover
- r = Retired
- d = Defaulted

=== Finals ===
Semifinals
(Soviet Union) Vladimir Korotkov	10	4	6
(West Germany) Hans-Jürgen Pohmann	8	6	3
(France) Georges Goven	6	6
(Poland) Bronisław Lewandowski	3	2

Final
(Soviet Union) Vladimir Korotkov	6	3	6
(France) Georges Goven	2	6	2

=== Top half ===
First round
(West Germany) Hans-Jürgen Pohmann	6	6
(Republic of Ireland) Desmond Early	1	1

Second round
(Belgium) Bernard Mignot	0	6	1
(Socialist Federal Republic of Yugoslavia) Željko Franulović	6	3	6
(Soviet Union) Vladimir Korotkov	6	6
(Netherlands) Richard Kasten	4	3
(Denmark) Michael Bernhoft	5	10	3
(Rhodesia) Sheridan Towers	7	8	6
(Sudan) A Talaat	1	1
(West Germany) H-J Pohmann	6	6

Quarterfinals
(Socialist Federal Republic of Yugoslavia) Ž Franulović	3	4
(Soviet Union) V Korotkov	6	6
(Rhodesia) S Towers	7	4	1
(West Germany) H-J Pohmann	5	6	6

Semifinals
(Soviet Union) V Korotkov	10	4	6
(West Germany) H-J Pohmann	8	6	3

=== Bottom half ===
First round
(Spain) Juan Guerrero	4	7	2
(France) Georges Goven	6	5	6

Second round
(France) G Goven	6	5	6
(Hungary) Péter Szőke	4	7	2
(Pakistan) Haroon Rahim	7	6
(Switzerland) Marcel Künzler	5	4
(Poland) Bronisław Lewandowski	6	6
(Norway) A Henriksen	1	2
(United Kingdom) David Lloyd	8	10
(Austria) Fritz Kolbinger	6	8

Quarterfinals
(France) G Goven	4	6	6
(Pakistan) H Rahim	6	4	1
(Poland) B Lewandowski	6	1	9
(United Kingdom) D Lloyd	2	6	7

Semifinals
(France) G Goven	6	6
(Poland) B Lewandowski	3	2
