= 1965 Wimbledon Championships – Girls' singles =

Girls' singles
- 1965 Wimbledon Championships

Final
- Champion: (Soviet Union) Olga Morozova
- Runner-up: (Argentina) Raquel Giscafré
- Score: 6–3, 6–3

Details
- Draw: 15

Events
Singles	men	women		boys	girls
Doubles	men	women	mixed	boys	girls
← 1964 ·	Wimbledon Championships	· 1966 →

Olga Morozova defeated Raquel Giscafré in the final, 6–3, 6–3 to win the girls' singles tennis title at the 1965 Wimbledon Championships.

== Draw ==
=== Key ===
- Q = Qualifier
- WC = Wild card
- LL = Lucky loser
- Alt = Alternate
- SE = Special exempt
- PR = Protected ranking
- ITF = ITF entry
- JE = Junior exempt
- w/o = Walkover
- r = Retired
- d = Defaulted
- SR = Special ranking

=== Draw ===
First round
(Austria) G Vyplasil	6	5	10
(Netherlands) Ada Bakker	2	7	8
(Rhodesia) Fiona Morris	6	6
(Switzerland) H Nyfeler	0	2
(West Germany) Katja Burgemeister	2	6	6
(India) Nirupama Vasant	6	4	2
(Soviet Union) Olga Morozova	8	6
(Denmark) Mari-Ann Bloch Jørgensen	6	4
(Republic of Ireland) C O'Donovan	0	0
(Belgium) Ingrid Loeys	6	6
(Sudan) MT Talaat	0	1
(Norway) Mona Smith	6	6
(United Kingdom) Janice Townsend	6	6	3
(Argentina) Raquel Giscafré	8	4	6

Quarterfinals
(Austria) G Vyplasil	6	7
(Rhodesia) Fiona Morris	1	5
(West Germany) Katja Burgemeister	3	6	5
(Soviet Union) Olga Morozova	6	3	7
(Belgium) Ingrid Loeys	6	6
(Norway) Mona Smith	0	0
(Argentina) Raquel Giscafré	6	6
(Jamaica) S Leyden	4	3

Semifinals
(Austria) G Vyplasil	4	0
(Soviet Union) Olga Morozova	6	6
(Belgium) Ingrid Loeys	5	6
(Argentina) Raquel Giscafré	7	8

Final
(Soviet Union) Olga Morozova	6	6
(Argentina) Raquel Giscafré	3	3
