= 1968 French Open =

- Date: 27 May – 9 June 1968
- Edition: 67
- Category: Grand Slam tournament
- Prize money: £26,150
- Surface: Clay
- Location: Paris (XVI^{e}), France
- Venue: Stade Roland Garros

Champions

Men's singles
- (Australia) Ken Rosewall

Women's singles
- (United States) Nancy Richey

Men's doubles
- (Australia) Ken Rosewall / (Australia) Fred Stolle

Women's doubles
- (France) Françoise Dürr / (United Kingdom) Ann Haydon-Jones

Mixed doubles
- (France) Françoise Dürr / (France) Jean-Claude Barclay

Boys' singles
- (Australia) Phil Dent

Girls' singles
- (Australia) Lesley Hunt
- French Open

The 1968 French Open was a tennis tournament that took place on the outdoor clay courts at the Stade Roland Garros in Paris, France. The tournament was held from Monday 27 May until Sunday 9 June 1968. It was the 67th edition of the French Open, the 38th to be open to foreign competitors, and the second major of the year.

This was the first Grand Slam that allowed professional players to compete and the first Grand Slam tournament in the Open Era. Ken Rosewall and Nancy Richey won the single titles.

The 72nd staging of the tournament went ahead, despite the French General Strike of 1968 which began on 2 May of that year.

== Finals ==
=== Seniors ===
==== Men's singles ====
(Australia) Ken Rosewall defeated (Australia) Rod Laver, 6–3, 6–1, 2–6, 6–2

- It was Rosewall's 5th career Grand Slam title and his 2nd French Open title.

==== Women's singles ====
(United States) Nancy Richey defeated (United Kingdom) Ann Haydon-Jones, 5–7, 6–4, 6–1

- It was Richey's 2nd and last career Grand Slam title and her only French Open title.

==== Men's doubles ====
(Australia) Ken Rosewall / (Australia) Fred Stolle defeated (Australia) Roy Emerson / (Australia) Rod Laver, 6–3, 6–4, 6–3

- It was Rosewall's 12th career Grand Slam title and his 4th and last French Open title. It was Stolle's 14th career Grand Slam title and his 3rd and last French Open title.

==== Women's doubles ====
(France) Françoise Dürr / (United Kingdom) Ann Haydon-Jones defeated (United States) Rosemary Casals / (United States) Billie Jean King, 7–5, 4–6, 6–4

- It was Dürr's 3rd career Grand Slam title and her 3rd French Open title. It was Haydon-Jones' 4th career Grand Slam title and her 4th French Open title.

==== Mixed doubles ====
(France) Françoise Dürr / (France) Jean-Claude Barclay defeated (United States) Billie Jean King / (Australia) Owen Davidson, 6–1, 6–4

- It was Durr's 4th career Grand Slam title and her 4th French Open title. It was Barclay's 1st career Grand Slam title and his 1st French Open title.

=== Juniors ===
==== Boys' singles ====
(Australia) Phil Dent defeated (Australia) John Alexander, 6–3, 3–6, 7–5

==== Girls' singles ====
(Australia) Lesley Hunt defeated (Soviet Union) Eugenia Isopaitis, 6–4, 6–2

Preceded by 1968 Australian Championships	Grand Slams	Succeeded by 1968 Wimbledon Championships
