= Jacques Thamin =

French tennis player

- Full name: Jacques Thamin
- Country (sports): France
- Born: 23 May 1952 (age 73) Cairo, Egypt
- Plays: Right-handed

Singles
- Career record: 6–20
- Career titles: 0
- Highest ranking: No. 137 (15 October 1973)

Grand Slam singles results
- Australian Open: 1R (1974)
- French Open: 1R (1968, 1970)

Doubles
- Career record: 11–25
- Career titles: 1

Grand Slam doubles results
- Australian Open: 1R (1977)
- French Open: 2R (1968, 1969, 1977, 1979)

Jacques Thamin (born 23 May 1952) is a former professional tennis player from France.

== Biography ==
Thamin was runner-up in the juniors event at the 1968 Wimbledon Championships, to Australian John Alexander. He also played in the men's singles draw, just days after his 16th birthday.

During the 1970s he competed professionally on the tennis circuit. He made the quarter-finals of a Grand Prix tournament in Madrid in 1973, with wins over Steve Faulk, Antonio Muñoz and Wanaro N'Godrella. In the quarter-final he won the first set against Ilie Năstase, before losing in three. He was runner-up at the Stuttgart Open in 1974, before the event was part of the Grand Prix circuit. His only Grand Prix final was in the doubles at Paris in 1977, which he and partner Christophe Roger-Vasselin won, aided by the controversial spaghetti racquets. He was a regular competitor at the French Open, mostly in doubles, and also appeared twice at the Australian Open.

== Grand Prix career finals ==
=== Doubles: 1 (1–0) ===
Result	W/L	Date	Tournament	Surface	Partner	Opponents	Score
Win	1–0	Sep 1977	Paris, France	Clay	(France) Christophe Roger-Vasselin	(Romania) Ilie Năstase (Romania) Ion Țiriac	6–2, 4–6, 6–3
