= Claude De Gronckel =

Belgian tennis player

- Country (sports): Belgium
- Born: 21 May 1943 (age 82); Brussels, Belgium
- Turned pro: 1956 (amateur tour)
- Plays: Right-handed

Singles
- Career record: 0–7

Grand Slam singles results
- Australian Open: 2R (1967)
- French Open: 2R (1965, 1966, 1967, 1968)
- Wimbledon: 2R (1965)
- US Open: 2R (1966)

Doubles
- Career record: 3–6

Grand Slam doubles results
- Australian Open: 2R (1967)
- French Open: 3R (1968)
- Wimbledon: 3R (1967)

Grand Slam mixed doubles results
- Australian Open: 2R (1967)
- Wimbledon: 2R (1965, 1967, 1968)

Claude De Gronckel (born 21 May 1943) is a former tennis player from Belgium who was active in the 1950s and 1960s.

== Tennis career ==
De Gronckel participated in the 1959 and 1961 Wimbledon boys' singles events, losing in the second round and semifinals, respectively.

De Gronckel was a regular member of the Belgium Davis Cup team throughout the 1960s, making his debut in 1960 against Brazil during the Europe Zone second round tie. During his Davis Cup career, he played 6 singles and 4 doubles matches without scoring any victories.

== See also ==
- List of Belgium Davis Cup team representatives
