= Fernando Gentil =

Brazilian tennis player

- Full name: Fernando Bunker Gentil
- Country (sports): Brazil
- Born: 11 March 1950 (age 75); Brazil

Singles
- Career record: 1–8
- Highest ranking: No. 222 (15 December 1975)

Grand Slam singles results
- French Open: 2R (1967, 1968)

Doubles
- Career record: 3–8

Grand Slam doubles results
- French Open: 2R (1975)
- US Open: 1R (1975)

Grand Slam mixed doubles results
- French Open: 1R (1968)

Fernando Bunker Gentil (born 11 March 1950) is a Brazilian former professional tennis player.

== Biography ==
Gentil was born in 1950, to a São Paulo surgeon and an American mother. His grandfather on his mother's side was diplomat Ellsworth Bunker, who was the U.S. Ambassador to South Vietnam from 1967 to 1973.

As a teenager, Gentil competed in the main draw of the French Open and twice reached the second round, both times with a walkover, including over Jan Kodeš in 1968. He left the tour to attend the University of Southern California and played collegiate tennis for the Trojans, before graduating with an MBA degree in 1974.

Gentil appeared in two Davis Cup ties for Brazil. He won each of his matches, a doubles rubber against Peru in 1976 and a singles rubber against Uruguay's Hugo Roverano in 1978.

His first wife Cláudia is the daughter of Wimbledon champion Bob Falkenburg. He remarried in 1984 to banker Elizabeth Marie Christiansen.

== See also ==
- List of Brazil Davis Cup team representatives
