= Nikola Špear =

Yugoslav tennis player (1944–2017)

- Country (sports): (Socialist Federal Republic of Yugoslavia) Yugoslavia
- Born: 22 February 1944 Subotica, Kingdom of Hungary
- Died: 2 December 2017 (aged 73) Subotica, Serbia
- Turned pro: 1965
- Retired: 1981
- Plays: Right-handed

Singles
- Career record: 116–172
- Career titles: 0
- Highest ranking: No. 68 (11 July 1977)

Grand Slam singles results
- Australian Open: 1R (1975)
- French Open: 4R (1966, 1967)
- Wimbledon: 2R (1970)
- US Open: 2R (1975)

Doubles
- Career record: 53–99
- Career titles: 0
- Highest ranking: No. 115 (1 March 1976)

Grand Slam doubles results
- Australian Open: 1R (1975)
- French Open: 3R (1970, 1971)
- Wimbledon: 3R (1968)
- US Open: 1R (1969, 1971, 1976)

Grand Slam mixed doubles results
- French Open: 2R (1968)
- Wimbledon: 3R (1970)

Team competitions
- Davis Cup: F^{Eu} (1970)

Nikola "Nikki" Špear (Serbian Cyrillic: Никола Шпеар; 22 February 1944 – 2 December 2017), often spelled Nicola Spear in English-language media, was a Serbian tennis player and coach who represented Yugoslavia in his playing career.

== Professional career ==
Špear won the senior championship of Yugoslavia 1968, 1972, 1973 and 1975.

Between 1969 and 1975, he represented Yugoslavia in the Davis Cup, compiling a 5–9 record in singles and 3–4 in doubles, for an overall 8–13 record across seven ties.

Following his playing career, Špear worked as a tennis coach, leading the Denmark Davis Cup team, the German Fed Cup team, and the FR Yugoslavia Davis Cup team.

In addition to his coaching career, he also organised tennis events in his hometown of Subotica.

== Career finals ==
=== Singles: 3 (3 runner-ups) ===
| Legend Grand Slam (0–0) Tennis Masters Cup (0–0) ATP Tour (0–3) | Finals by surface Hard (0–1) Clay (0–2) Grass (0–0) | Finals by setting Outdoor (0–2) Indoor (0–1) |

| Result | W–L | Date | Tournament | Surface | Opponent | Score |
|---|---|---|---|---|---|---|
| Loss | 0–1 | Mar 1970 | Barranquilla, Colombia | Clay | (Socialist Federal Republic of Yugoslavia) Željko Franulović | 7–9, 3–6, 3–6 |
| Loss | 0–2 | Mar 1971 | Pensacola, United States | Hard (i) | (Czechoslovakia) Milan Holeček | 6–4, 3–6, 3–6 |
| Loss | 0–3 | Feb 1975 | Algiers, Algeria | Clay | (Sweden) Birger Andersson | 7–5, 6–2, 0–6, 1–6, 2–6 |

=== Doubles: 1 (1 runner-up) ===
| Legend Grand Slam (0–0) Tennis Masters Cup (0–0) ATP Tour (0–1) | Finals by surface Hard (0–0) Clay (0–1) Grass (0–0) | Finals by setting Outdoor (0–1) Indoor (0–0) |

| Result | W–L | Date | Tournament | Surface | Partner | Opponents | Score |
|---|---|---|---|---|---|---|---|
| Loss | 0–1 | May 1977 | Munich, Germany | Clay | (United States) John Whitlinger | (Czechoslovakia) František Pála (Hungary) Balázs Taróczy | 3–6, 4–6 |

== Singles performance timeline ==
Key
| W | F | SF | QF | #R | RR | Q# | P# | DNQ | A | Z# | PO | G | S | B | NMS | NTI | P | NH |

(W) winner; (F) finalist; (SF) semifinalist; (QF) quarterfinalist; (#R) rounds 4, 3, 2, 1; (RR) round-robin stage; (Q#) qualification round; (P#) preliminary round; (DNQ) did not qualify; (A) absent; (Z#) Davis/Fed Cup Zonal Group (with number indication) or (PO) play-off; (G) gold, (S) silver or (B) bronze Olympic/Paralympic medal; (NMS) not a Masters tournament; (NTI) not a Tier I tournament; (P) postponed; (NH) not held; (SR) strike rate (events won / competed); (W–L) win–loss record.

| Tournament | 1965 | 1966 | 1967 | 1968 | 1969 | 1970 | 1971 | 1972 | 1973 | 1974 | 1975 | 1976 | 1977 | 1978 | 1979 | 1980 | 1981 | SR | W–L | Win % |
|---|---|---|---|---|---|---|---|---|---|---|---|---|---|---|---|---|---|---|---|---|
Grand Slam tournaments
| Australian Open | A | A | A | A | A | A | A | A | A | A | 1R | A | A | A | A | A | A | 0 / 1 | 0–1 | 0% |
| French Open | 1R | 4R | 4R | 2R | 1R | 3R | 2R | P2 | 1R | Q1 | 2R | 1R | 1R | 1R | 1R | A | A | 0 / 13 | 10–11 | 48% |
| Wimbledon | A | A | 1R | 1R | 1R | 2R | 1R | 1R | A | A | 1R | 1R | A | A | A | A | A | 0 / 8 | 1–8 | 11% |
| US Open | A | A | A | A | A | A | 1R | A | A | 1R | 2R | 1R | 1R | A | A | A | A | 0 / 5 | 1–5 | 17% |
| Win–loss | 0–0 | 3–1 | 2–2 | 1–2 | 0–1 | 3–2 | 1–3 | 0–1 | 0–1 | 0–1 | 2–4 | 0–3 | 0–2 | 0–1 | 0–1 | 0–0 | 0–0 | 0 / 28 | 12–25 | 32% |
National representation
| Davis Cup | A | A | A | A | QF^{Eu} | F^{Eu} | A | 1R^{Eu} | A | A | QF^{Eu} | A | A | A | A | A | A | 0 / 4 | 5–9 | 36% |
| Win–loss | 0–0 | 0–0 | 0–0 | 0–0 | 0–2 | 4–4 | 0–0 | 0–2 | 0–0 | 0–0 | 1–1 | 0–0 | 0–0 | 0–0 | 0–0 | 0–0 | 0–0 | 0 / 4 | 5–9 | 36% |
Career statistics
| | 1965 | 1966 | 1967 | 1968 | 1969 | 1970 | 1971 | 1972 | 1973 | 1974 | 1975 | 1976 | 1977 | 1978 | 1979 | 1980 | 1981 | Career | | |
| Tournaments | 1 | 1 | 2 | 3 | 5 | 13 | 15 | 11 | 13 | 13 | 25 | 16 | 19 | 4 | 3 | 2 | 0 | 146 | | |
| Titles / Finals | 0 / 0 | 0 / 0 | 0 / 0 | 0 / 0 | 0 / 0 | 0 / 0 | 0 / 0 | 0 / 0 | 0 / 0 | 0 / 0 | 0 / 0 | 0 / 0 | 0 / 0 | 0 / 0 | 0 / 0 | 0 / 0 | 0 / 0 | 0 / 0 | | |
| Overall win–loss | 0–0 | 3–1 | 2–2 | 1–3 | 2–3 | 14–13 | 4–15 | 3–10 | 5–12 | 2–12 | 16–25 | 5–16 | 15–19 | 1–4 | 1–3 | 0–2 | 0–0 | 70–144 | | |
| Win % | – | 75% | 50% | 25% | 40% | 52% | 21% | 23% | 29% | 14% | 39% | 24% | 44% | 20% | 25% | 0% | – | 35% | | |
| Year-end ranking | N/A | | | | | | | | 124 | 153 | 92 | 151 | 122 | 357 | 312 | 383 | N/A | No. 78 | | |

== Records ==
| Year | Record | Players matched |
|---|---|---|
| 1968 | Triple bagel win (6–0, 6–0, 6–0) | At least 17 players |
