= Ingrid Palmieri =

Belgian tennis player

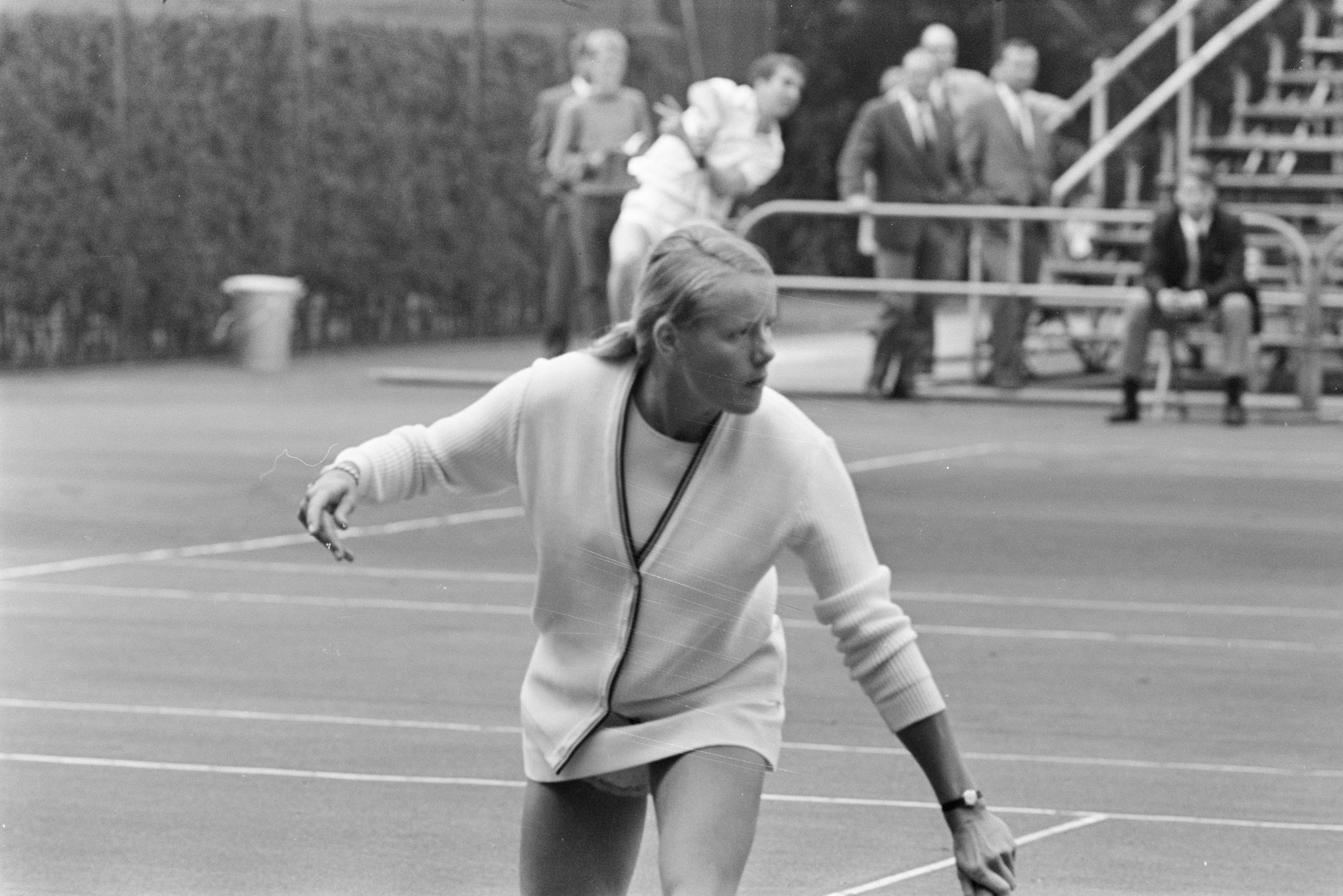
- Full name: Ingrid Palmieri (Loeys)
- Country (sports): Belgium
- Born: 12 January 1948 (age 77)
- Plays: Left-handed

Singles

Grand Slam singles results
- French Open: 2R (1968, 1969)
- Wimbledon: 2R (1967, 1969)

Doubles

Grand Slam doubles results
- French Open: 1R (1967, 1968)
- Wimbledon: 1R (1967, 1968, 1969)

Ingrid Palmieri (born 12 January 1948) is a Belgian former professional tennis player. She originally competed as Ingrid Loeys, before her marriage to Italian tennis player Sergio Palmieri.

Palmieri, a left-handed player, was Belgian youth champion (18s) in 1966 and represented the Belgium Federation Cup team from 1967 to 1970. She competed in the main draws of the French Open and Wimbledon during her career.
