= Paul Hutchins =

British tennis player (1945–2019)

- Full name: Paul Raymond Hutchins
- Country (sports): (United Kingdom) Great Britain
- Residence: Wimbledon, London, England
- Born: 5 April 1945; Bristol, England
- Died: 14 March 2019 (aged 73)
- Turned pro: 1968 (amateur tour from 1962)
- Retired: 1973
- Plays: Right-handed (one-handed backhand)

Singles

Grand Slam singles results
- French Open: 3R (1968)
- Wimbledon: 1R (1966, 1967, 1968, 1969, 1972)
- US Open: 3R (1968)

Doubles

Grand Slam doubles results
- French Open: QF (1968)
- Wimbledon: 3R (1968)
- US Open: 2R (1968)

Mixed doubles

Grand Slam mixed doubles results
- Wimbledon: 3R (1971, 1973)

Team competitions
- Davis Cup: SF^{Eu} (1968)

Paul Raymond Hutchins MBE (5 April 1945 – 14 March 2019) was a British tennis player and Davis Cup player.

He was the longest serving British Davis Cup captain, being in charge for 31 matches and 13 years, including the 1978 final.

== Biography ==
Born in Bristol, Hutchins was educated at Millfield School.

Hutchins was a Davis Cup player and Captain for Great Britain from 1975 to 1987. In 1968, he made the third round of the men's singles at the French Open and the US Open, and the quarterfinals of the men's doubles at the French, partnering Gerald Battrick.

Hutchins largely stopped playing at the age of 25 due to injury, though he did play a few matches in 1972 & 1973.

He had four children, the most noteworthy being Ross, a former ATP Pro.
