= István Gulyás =

Hungarian tennis player

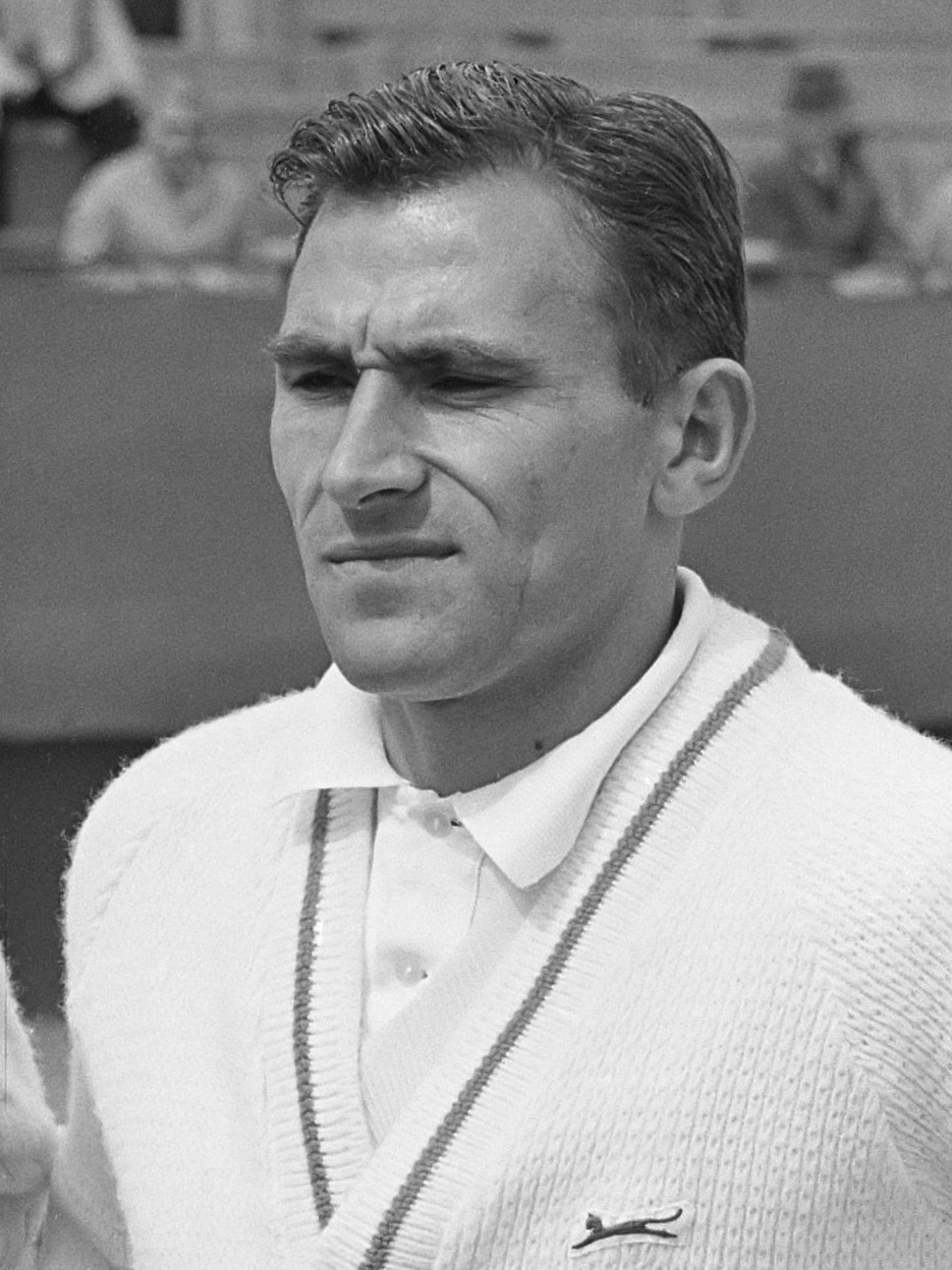
- István Gulyás in 1964
- Country (sports): Hungary
- Born: 13 October 1931; Pécs, Hungary
- Died: 31 July 2000 (aged 68); Budapest, Hungary
- Turned pro: 1968 (amateur from 1954)
- Retired: 1973
- Plays: Right-handed (one-handed backhand)

Singles
- Career titles: 20
- Highest ranking: No. 8 (1966, Lance Tingay)

Grand Slam singles results
- French Open: F (1966)
- Wimbledon: 3R (1960)
- US Open: 4R (1963)

Doubles

Grand Slam doubles results
- Wimbledon: 2R (1955, 1961, 1963)

Grand Slam mixed doubles results
- Wimbledon: 3R (1955, 1959)

István Gulyás (Hungarian: Gulyás István; 14 October 1931 – 31 July 2000) was a Hungarian tennis player. He was the second Hungarian man to reach a major singles final, after Jozsef Asboth in 1947. Gulyás was defeated in the 1966 French Championships final to Tony Roche in three sets, after permitting the match to be delayed by a day for Roche to recover from an ankle injury. He was ranked inside the world's Top 10 on multiple occasions, and Lance Tingay of The Daily Telegraph ranked Gulyás as the world No. 8 in 1966. He holds the record for the most Hungarian National Championship titles with 15.

== Grand Slam finals ==
=== Singles: 1 (0-1) ===
Result	Year	Championship	Surface	Opponent	Score
Loss	1966	French Championships	Clay	(Australia) Tony Roche	1–6, 4–6, 5–7

== Grand Slam tournament performance timeline ==
Key
W	F	SF	QF	#R	RR	Q#	DNQ	A	NH

(W) winner; (F) finalist; (SF) semifinalist; (QF) quarterfinalist; (#R) rounds 4, 3, 2, 1; (RR) round-robin stage; (Q#) qualification round; (DNQ) did not qualify; (A) absent; (NH) not held; (SR) strike rate (events won / competed); (W–L) win–loss record.

=== Singles ===
Tournament	1955	1956	1957	1958	1959	1960	1961	1962	1963	1964	1965	1966	1967	1968	1969	1970	1971	1972	1973	SR
Australian Open	A	A	A	A	A	A	A	A	A	A	A	A	A	A	A	A	A	A	A	0 / 0
French Open	1R	A	A	4R	A	3R	2R	3R	3R	3R	2R	F	SF	4R	4R	2R	QF	1R	1R	0 / 15
Wimbledon	2R	A	A	1R	1R	3R	2R	1R	2R	2R	1R	1R	2R	1R	1R	1R	1R	1R	1R	0 / 17
US Open	A	A	A	A	A	A	A	A	4R	A	A	A	A	A	A	A	A	A	A	0 / 1
Strike rate	0 / 2	0 / 0	0 / 0	0 / 2	0 / 1	0 / 2	0 / 2	0 / 2	0 / 3	0 / 2	0 / 2	0 / 2	0 / 1	0 / 2	0 / 2	0 / 2	0 / 2	0 / 2	0 / 2	0 / 33
