= Sever Dron =

Romanian tennis player and coach

- Full name: Sever Constantin Dron
- Country (sports): Romania
- Born: 25 June 1944 (age 81) Găieşti, Romania

Singles
- Career record: 1–11

Grand Slam singles results
- French Open: 2R (1968)
- US Open: 1R (1969)

Doubles
- Career record: 4–9

Grand Slam doubles results
- French Open: 3R (1971)
- US Open: 1R (1969)

Sever Constantin Dron (born 25 June 1944) is a former professional tennis player and current coach.

After winning several junior national championships, he played for the Romanian Davis Cup team in 1969 and 1971, along Ilie Nastase and Ion Tiriac, among others.

A graduate of the Bucharest Sports Academy in 1966, he defected to France in 1972, requesting political asylum. There he became a coach, training among others, Virginia Ruzici, Henri Leconte and Julie Halard.

In 1989, he became a French citizen.

He is the founder of "Institut du Tennis Sever Dron" in France and "Tenis Club 2000 – Academia Sever Dron" in Romania.

== Awards and honors ==
- Honorary citizen of Melun, France
- Silver and bronze medals by the French Tennis Federation

== Book ==
- Sever Dron, Am ales să fiu "nimeni" (I chose to be "nobody"), Pandora M, Bucharest, 2013
