= Bronisław Lewandowski =

Polish tennis player

- Country (sports): Poland
- Born: 31 August 1947
- Died: 11 February 1998 (aged 50) Warsaw, Poland

Singles
- Career record: 0–3

Grand Slam singles results
- French Open: 2R (1968)

Doubles
- Career record: 1–2

Grand Slam doubles results
- French Open: 2R (1968)
- Wimbledon: 1R (1968)

Bronisław Lewandowski (31 August 1947 - 11 February 1998) was a Polish professional tennis player.

Lewandowski, a Wimbledon junior semi-finalist, played in two Davis Cup ties for Poland during his career. He won a singles and doubles rubber in Poland's 5–0 win over Israel in 1967 and then in 1968 lost his two singles rubbers against Belgium, with both going to a fifth set.

His career was ended prematurely due to health concerns. He later captained Poland's Davis Cup team and was serving in that role when he died of heart failure in 1998, at the age of 50.

== See also ==
- List of Poland Davis Cup team representatives
