= Bob Maud =

South African tennis player

- Country (sports): South Africa
- Born: 12 August 1946 Johannesburg, Transvaal, Union of South Africa
- Died: 15 March 2006 (aged 59) Krugersdorp, Gauteng, South Africa
- Height: 1.81 m (5 ft 11 in)
- Plays: Right

Singles
- Career titles: 3

Grand Slam singles results
- Australian Open: 1R (1971)
- French Open: 3R (1968, 1969)
- Wimbledon: 3R (1967)
- US Open: 2R (1972)

Doubles
- Career titles: 0

Grand Slam doubles results
- Australian Open: 1R (1971)
- French Open: QF (1971)
- Wimbledon: QF (1971)
- US Open: 3R (1971)

Grand Slam mixed doubles results
- Wimbledon: QF (1966, 1967, 1970)
- US Open: F (1971)

Robert Roy Maud (12 August 1946 – 15 March 2006) was a South African tennis player.

Maud made his Davis Cup debut at the age of 18, and was a member of the squad that gained South Africa's only Davis Cup triumph in 1974. He was 5’11 and three quarters and He was ranked in the Top 10 in South Africa for 10 successive years, and partnered Betty Stöve to the 1971 US Open mixed doubles final against Billie Jean King and Owen Davidson (3–6, 5–7).

In July 1968 he won the singles title at the Dutch Open in Hilversum after defeating István Gulyás in the final in five sets.

== Grand Slam finals ==
=== Mixed doubles ===
Result	Year	Championship	Surface	Partner	Opponents	Score
Loss	1971	US Open	Grass	(Netherlands) Betty Stöve	(United States) Billie Jean King (Australia) Owen Davidson	3–6, 5–7
