= Gaetano Di Maso =

Italian tennis player (born 1945)

- Country (sports): Italy
- Born: 9 March 1945 (age 80); Naples, Italy

Singles
- Career record: 4–9

Grand Slam singles results
- French Open: 2R (1965, 1966, 1967)
- Wimbledon: 1R (1966, 1967, 1968)

Gaetano Di Maso (born 9 March 1945) is an Italian former professional tennis player.

Born in Naples, Di Maso competed on the international tour in the 1960s and played Davis Cup tennis for Italy.

During his career he featured in a total of two Davis Cup ties, both in 1966, as the doubles partner of Giordano Maioli against the Soviet Union and South Africa. He played in the second round at Roland Garros on three occasions, including in 1966 after coming from two sets down for a first round win over Ron Holmberg. In 1968 he won through to the third round of the Italian Open.

Di Maso married French tennis player Monique Salfati.

== See also ==
- List of Italy Davis Cup team representatives
