= Georges Deniau =

French tennis player turned coach (born 1932)

- Born: 25 December 1932 (age 92); Paris, France
- Height: 1.85 m (6 ft 1 in)
- Plays: Right-handed

Georges Deniau (born 25 December 1932) is a French tennis player turned coach.

== Biography ==
Georges Deniau started playing tennis in Argelès-Gazost and began competing in 1945 at the PAC (Rueil). As a player, he reached the 3rd round of the Roland-Garros singles in 1955 and 1956. During the Open Era, he played in the 1st round in 1968 against Ion Țiriac and participated in the doubles tournament annually until 1972.

After being ranked in the 1st series for 6 years, he became a coach starting in 1961 and won the French professional championship title in 1962.

He ran a tennis school at an altitude of 1600m in Flaine in the Alps. He notably worked with the France Davis Cup team in the early 1970s, and the Switzerland Davis Cup team in the 1980s, where he later served as national technical director for 5 years, leading the team to the final in the 1992 Davis Cup. As a player coach, he notably coached Guy Forget and Jakob Hlasek.

He also published several technical works, wrote articles, and was responsible for the technical pages of Tennis Magazine from 1976. In 2011, he released From the Musketeers to Federer, a work in which he recounts his encounters with great players in history, from Henri Cochet to Roger Federer.

== Publications ==
- Tennis total, La Jeune Parque, 1970
- Tennis – la technique, la tactique, l'entraînement (Tennis – technique, tactics, training), Robert Laffont, 1974 ISBN 2221051556
- How to Win in 15 Tennis Lessons, Mengès, 1982 ISBN 2856201555
- From the Musketeers to Federer, Edilac, 2011 ISBN 2-915351-15-5
