= Sergio Palmieri =

Italian tennis player

- Country (sports): Italy
- Born: 28 November 1945 (age 80) Rome, Italy

Singles
- Career record: 5–17

Grand Slam singles results
- French Open: 2R (1965, 1969)

Doubles
- Career record: 0–9

Grand Slam doubles results
- French Open: 2R (1971)

Grand Slam mixed doubles results
- Wimbledon: 3R (1971)

Sergio Palmieri (born 28 November 1945) is an Italian former professional tennis player. He was later John McEnroe's agent.

Born in Rome, Palmieri featured on the professional tour in the 1960s and 1970s.

Palmieri twice made the second round at Roland Garros, which included a win in 1965 over former tournament champion Jaroslav Drobný. His best performance on the Grand Prix circuit was a quarter-final appearance at the Senigallia Open in 1971.
