= Nicholas Kalogeropoulos =

Greek tennis player (born 1945)

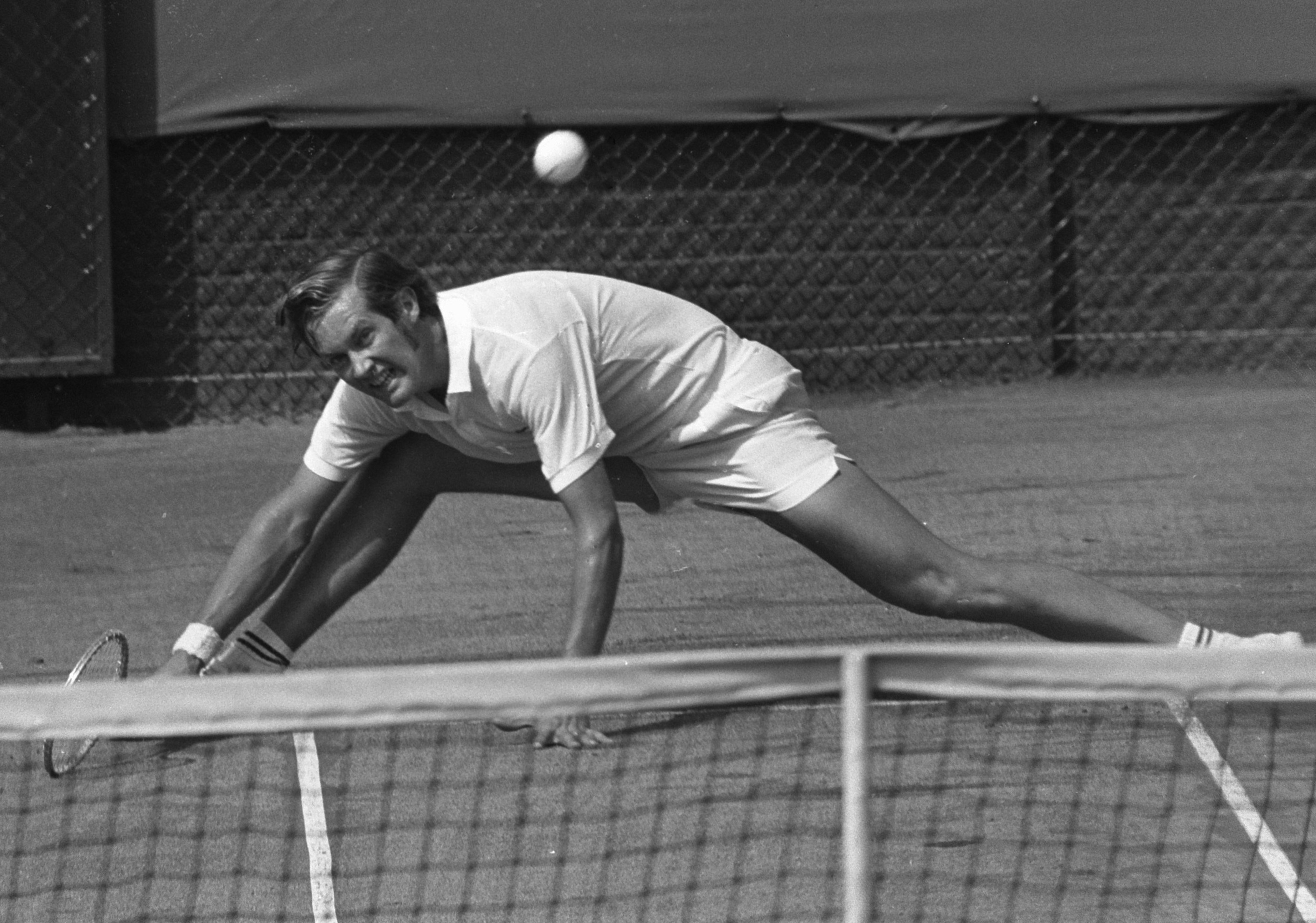
- Nicholas Kalogeropoulos in 1970
- Country (sports): Greece
- Residence: San Jose, Costa Rica
- Born: 18 February 1945 (age 81) Costa Rica
- Turned pro: 1968 (amateur from 1960)
- Retired: 1978
- Plays: Right-handed

Singles
- Career record: 52–70
- Career titles: 0
- Highest ranking: No. 108 (26 September 1973)

Grand Slam singles results
- French Open: 3R (1967)
- Wimbledon: 4R (1964)

Doubles
- Career record: 34-48
- Career titles: 0

Grand Slam doubles results
- French Open: 3R (1969, 1970)
- Wimbledon: 2R (1970, 1972)
Medal record
Mediterranean Games
Bronze medal – third place	1971 İzmir	Singles

Nicholas Kalogeropoulos (Greek: Νικόλαος Καλογερόπουλος; born 18 February 1945), also known as Nicky Kalo, is a retired Greek tennis player who won a bronze medal at the 1971 Mediterranean Games. In doubles, he finished as runner-up at the 1968 Italian Open. He was ranked as the best Greek player from 1962–74 and was a member of the Greek Davis Cup team from 1963–81.

Kalogeropoulos was born to Greek parents in Costa Rica, where he started training in tennis and spent many years of his life. In 1962, he won the junior Wimbledon and French Championships. In 1966, he married fellow tennis player Carol-Ann Prosen. He retired in 1978.

== Career finals ==
=== Doubles (3 runner-ups) ===
Result	W/L	Date	Tournament	Surface	Partner	Opponents	Score
Loss	0–1	May 1968	Rome, Italy	Clay	(Australia) Allan Stone	(Netherlands) Tom Okker (United States) Marty Riessen	3–6, 4–6, 2–6
Loss	0–2	Jun 1972	Eastbourne, England	Grass	(Rhodesia) Andrew Pattison	(Spain) Juan Gisbert Sr. (Spain) Manuel Orantes	6–8, 3–6
Loss	0–3	Feb 1974	Birmingham, US	Hard	(Colombia) Iván Molina	(Australia) Ian Fletcher (United States) Sandy Mayer	6–4, 6–7, 1–6
