= Jean-Claude Barclay =

French former tennis player (born 1942)

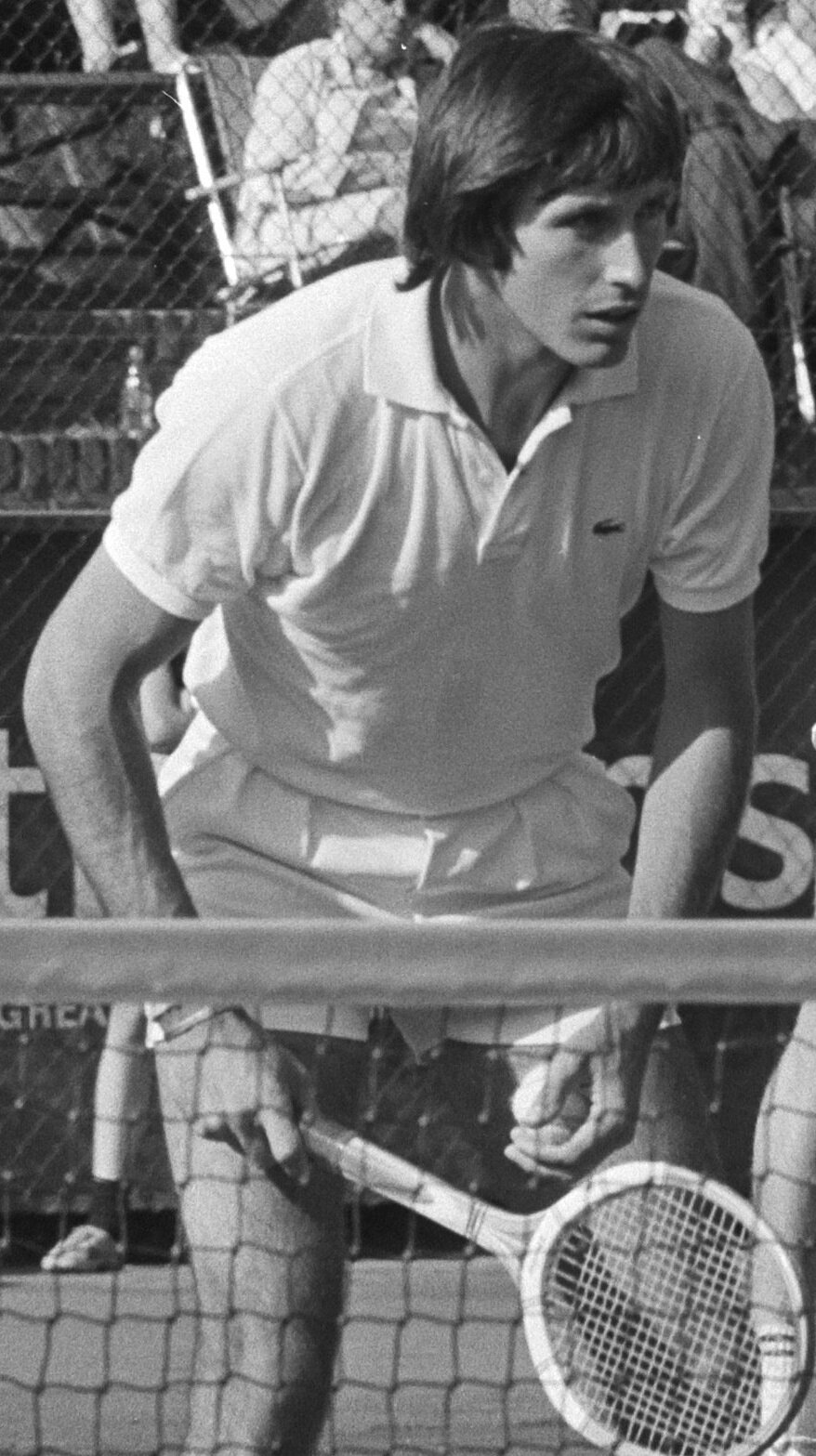
- Jean-Claude Barclay (1971)
- Country (sports): France
- Born: 30 December 1942 (age 83) Paris, France
- Plays: Right-handed

Singles
- Career record: 14–33

Grand Slam singles results
- French Open: QF (1963)
- Wimbledon: 2R (1961, 1965, 1970)
- US Open: 1R (1965)

Doubles
- Career record: 21–25

Grand Slam doubles results
- French Open: QF (1970)
- Wimbledon: F (1963)

Grand Slam mixed doubles results
- French Open: W (1968, 1971, 1973)
- Wimbledon: QF (1965)

Jean-Claude Barclay (born 30 December 1942) is a former French international tennis player. He competed in the Davis Cup a number of times, from 1962 to 1963.

He won the mixed doubles title at the French Open in 1968, 1971 and 1973 together with his partner Françoise Dürr.

== Grand Slam finals ==
=== Doubles (1 runner-up) ===
Result	Year	Championship	Surface	Partner	Opponents	Score
Loss	1963	Wimbledon	Grass	(France) Pierre Darmon	(Mexico) Antonio Palafox (Mexico) Rafael Osuna	6–4, 2–6, 2–6, 2–6

=== Mixed doubles (3 titles, 3 runner-ups) ===
Result	Year	Championship	Surface	Partner	Opponents	Score
Win	1968	French Open	Clay	(France) Françoise Dürr	(United States) Billie Jean King (Australia) Owen Davidson	6–1, 6–4
Loss	1969	French Open	Clay	(France) Françoise Dürr	(Australia) Margaret Court (United States) Marty Riessen	3–6, 2–6
Loss	1970	French Open	Clay	(France) Françoise Dürr	(United States) Billie Jean King (South Africa) Bob Hewitt	6–3, 4–6, 2–6
Win	1971	French Open	Clay	(France) Françoise Dürr	(United Kingdom) Winnie Shaw (Soviet Union) Toomas Leius	6–2, 6–4
Loss	1972	French Open	Clay	(France) Françoise Dürr	(Australia) Evonne Goolagong (Australia) Kim Warwick	2–6, 4–6
Win	1973	French Open	Clay	(France) Françoise Dürr	(Netherlands) Betty Stöve (France) Patrice Dominguez	6–1, 6–4
