= Wiesław Gąsiorek =

Polish tennis player

- Country (sports): Poland
- Born: 13 January 1936; Poznań, Poland
- Died: 4 February 2002 (aged 66)

Singles
- Career record: 18–17

Grand Slam singles results
- French Open: 4R (1967, 1969)
- Wimbledon: 3R (1961)
- US Open: 2R (1962)

Doubles
- Career record: 4–9

Wiesław Gąsiorek (13 January 1936 – 4 February 2002) was a professional tennis player from Poland. He competed in the Davis Cup a number of times, from 1959 to 1972.
