= 1966 Australian Championships – Men's doubles =

Men's doubles
- 1966 Australian Championships
- 1965 Champions: (Australia) John Newcombe (Australia) Tony Roche

Final
- Champions: (Australia) Roy Emerson (Australia) Fred Stolle
- Runners-up: (Australia) John Newcombe (Australia) Tony Roche
- Score: 7–9, 6–3, 6–8, 14–12, 12–10

Details
- Draw: 32
- Seeds: 8

Events
Singles	men	women
Doubles	men	women
- Australian Championships

Roy Emerson and Fred Stolle defeated John Newcombe and Tony Roche in the final 7–9, 6–3, 6–8, 14–12, 12–10, to win the men's doubles tennis title at the 1966 Australian Championships. Newcombe and Roche were the defending champions.

== Seeds ==
Champion seeds are indicated in bold text while text in italics indicates the round in which those seeds were eliminated.

1. (Australia) John Newcombe / (Australia) Tony Roche (final)
2. (United States) Clark Graebner / (United States) Marty Riessen (quarterfinals)
3. (Australia) **Roy Emerson** / (Australia) **Fred Stolle (champions)**
4. (United States) ~~Arthur Ashe~~ / (United States) ~~Cliff Richey~~ (Richey withdrew due to his studies)
5. (Australia) Bill Bowrey / (Australia) Owen Davidson (semifinals)
6. (New Zealand) Lew Gerrard / (United Kingdom) Roger Taylor (second round)
7. (Australia) John Cottrill / (Australia) Ray Ruffels (semifinals)
8. (United States) Herb Fitzgibbon / (United States) Jim McManus (quarterfinals)

== Draw ==
Key

- Q = Qualifier
- WC = Wild card
- LL = Lucky loser
- Alt = Alternate
- ITF = ITF entry
- PR = Protected ranking
- SR = Special ranking
- SE = Special exempt
- JE = Junior exempt
- JR = Junior Accelerator Programme entrant
- CO = College Accelerator Programme entrant
- NG = Next Gen Accelerator Program entrant
- w/o = Walkover
- r = Retired
- d = Defaulted

=== Final ===
Final

1
- (Australia) John Newcombe
- (Australia) Tony Roche
**9**
3
**8**
12
10

3
- (Australia) **Roy Emerson**
- (Australia) **Fred Stolle**
7
**6**
6
**14**
**12**

=== Top half ===
First round

Second round

Quarterfinals

Semifinals

1
- (Australia) **J Newcombe**
- (Australia) **T Roche**
**6**
**6**
**9**

- (Australia) T Musgrave
- (Australia) J Walker
3
4
7

1
- (Australia) **J Newcombe**
- (Australia) **T Roche**
**6**
**6**
**6**

- (Indonesia) G Soenhoew
- (Indonesia) S Sugiarto
3
1
3

- (Australia) B Bowman
- (Australia) A Lane
2
2
4

- (Australia) **B Bowman**
- (Australia) **A Lane**
**6**
**6**
**6**

1
- (Australia) **J Newcombe**
- (Australia) **T Roche**
3
**6**
**6**
**6**

- (Australia) **J Cooper**
- (Australia) **A Stone**
**6**
**6**
**6**

8
- (United States) H Fitzgibbon
- (United States) J McManus
**6**
4
4
2

- (Australia) C Farr
- (Australia) D Farr
3
3
2

- (Australia) J Cooper
- (Australia) A Stone
4
4
2

- (Argentina) A Harms
- (Australia) G Pollard
0
2
1

8
- (United States) **H Fitzgibbon**
- (United States) **J McManus**
**6**
**6**
**6**

8
- (United States) **H Fitzgibbon**
- (United States) **J McManus**
**6**
**6**
**6**

1
- (Australia) **J Newcombe**
- (Australia) **T Roche**
**6**
**9**
**12**

7
- (Australia) **J Cottrill**
- (Australia) **R Ruffels**
**11**
**9**
**6**

7
- (Australia) J Cottrill
- (Australia) R Ruffels
4
7
10

- (Australia) B Geraghty
- (Australia) M Holland
9
7
4

7
- (Australia) **J Cottrill**
- (Australia) **R Ruffels**
8
**7**
**6**
7
**6**

- (Australia) J Stanbury
- (Australia) R White
6
6
6

- (Netherlands) T Okker
- (Chile) P Rodríguez
**10**
5
3
**9**
4

- (Netherlands) **T Okker**
- (Chile) **P Rodríguez**
**8**
**8**
**8**

7
- (Australia) **J Cottrill**
- (Australia) **R Ruffels**
9
4
**6**
**7**
**6**

- (Sweden) **L Bergelin**
- (Australia) **D Crealy**
**6**
**7**
**6**

- (Sweden) L Bergelin
- (Australia) D Crealy
**11**
**6**
1
5
4

- (Australia) A Bashford
- (Australia) B Gulley
3
5
2

- (Sweden) **L Bergelin**
- (Australia) **D Crealy**
**6**
**6**
5
**6**

- (Israel) Y Shalem
- (Australia) K Williams

- (United States) A Ashe
- (United States) G MacCall
2
3
**7**
1

- (United States) **A Ashe**
- (United States) **G MacCall**
w.
o.

=== Bottom half ===
First round

Second round

Quarterfinals

Semifinals

3
- (Australia) **R Emerson**
- (Australia) **F Stolle**
**9**
**6**
**13**

- (Australia) J Brown
- (Jamaica) R Russell
7
3
11

3
- (Australia) **R Emerson**
- (Australia) **F Stolle**
**6**
**6**
**6**

- (Australia) G Primrose
- (Australia) R Sherriff
3
4
**9**
8

- (Australia) B Phillips-Moore
- (Australia) E Russo
3
2
2

- (Australia) **B Phillips-Moore**
- (Australia) **E Russo**
**6**
**6**
7
**10**

3
- (Australia) **R Emerson**
- (Australia) **F Stolle**
**6**
**6**
**6**

- (Australia) **W Coghlan**
- (Australia) **C Stubs**
**6**
**8**
**6**

- (Australia) W Coghlan
- (Australia) C Stubs
2
3
3

- (Argentina) J Ganzábal
- (Argentina) D Harms
2
6
2

- (Australia) **W Coghlan**
- (Australia) **C Stubs**
**6**
3
**8**
**11**

- (Australia) N Brent
- (Australia) R Brent
4
3
3

6
- (New Zealand) L Gerrard
- (United Kingdom) R Taylor
4
**6**
6
9

6
- (New Zealand) **L Gerrard**
- (United Kingdom) **R Taylor**
**6**
**6**
**6**

3
- (Australia) **R Emerson**
- (Australia) **F Stolle**
7
**6**
**6**
**6**

5
- (Australia) **B Bowrey**
- (Australia) **O Davidson**
**6**
**6**
**6**

5
- (Australia) B Bowrey
- (Australia) O Davidson
**9**
4
4
2

- (Australia) K Coombes
- (Australia) G Hogben
4
3
4

5
- (Australia) **B Bowrey**
- (Australia) **O Davidson**
**6**
**7**
**6**

- (Belgium) M De Ville
- (Spain) J Gisbert
**6**
2
**6**
3
2

- (Rhodesia) R Dowdeswell
- (United Kingdom) T Phillips
2
5
4

- (Rhodesia) **R Dowdeswell**
- (United Kingdom) **T Phillips**
4
**6**
3
**6**
**6**

5
- (Australia) **B Bowrey**
- (Australia) **O Davidson**
**6**
3
**7**
**10**

- (Australia) **W Jacques**
- (Australia) **J Pearce**
4
**6**
**6**
**7**

2
- (United States) C Graebner
- (United States) M Riessen
4
**6**
5
8

- (Australia) A Bailey
- (Australia) R Brien
**6**
3
1
5

- (Australia) W Jacques
- (Australia) J Pearce
4
4
4

- (Australia) J Christopherson
- (Australia) R Wilson
4
5
4

2
- (United States) **C Graebner**
- (United States) **M Riessen**
**6**
**6**
**6**

2
- (United States) **C Graebner**
- (United States) **M Riessen**
**6**
**7**
**6**
