= 1965 Australian Championships – Men's singles =

Men's singles
- 1965 Australian Championships

Final
- Champion: (Australia) Roy Emerson
- Runner-up: (Australia) Fred Stolle
- Score: 7–9, 2–6, 6–4, 7–5, 6–1

Details
- Draw: 56
- Seeds: 16

Events
Singles	men	women
Doubles	men	women
- Australian Championships

First-seeded Roy Emerson defeated Fred Stolle 7–9, 2–6, 6–4, 7–5, 6–1 in the final to win the men's singles tennis title at the 1965 Australian Championships.

== Seeds ==
The seeded players are listed below. Roy Emerson is the champion; others show the round in which they were eliminated.

1. (Australia) Roy Emerson (champion)
2. (Australia) Fred Stolle (finalist)
3. (Australia) John Newcombe (semifinals)
4. (Australia) Tony Roche (semifinals)
5. (France) Pierre Darmon (quarterfinals)
6. (France) Pierre Barthès (third round)
7. (New Zealand) Lew Gerrard (third round)
8. (Netherlands) Tom Okker (second round)
9. (Australia) Owen Davidson (quarterfinals)
10. (Australia) Bill Bowrey (quarterfinals)
11. (Australia) Barry Phillips-Moore (third round)
12. (Australia) Warren Jacques (first round)
13. (United Kingdom) Graham Stilwell (second round)
14. (Japan) Osamu Ishiguro (third round)
15. (France) François Jauffret (third round)
16. (Netherlands) Jan Hajer (first round)

== Draw ==
=== Key ===
- Q = Qualifier
- WC = Wild card
- LL = Lucky loser
- r = Retired

=== Finals ===
Quarterfinals
1	(Australia) Roy Emerson	6	6	6
(Spain) Juan Gisbert	3	3	1
3	(Australia) John Newcombe	6	4	2	6	6
10	(Australia) Bill Bowrey	2	6	6	3	4
5	(France) Pierre Darmon	8	2	3	0
4	(Australia) Tony Roche	6	6	6	6
9	(Australia) Owen Davidson	6	0	0	3
2	(Australia) Fred Stolle	3	6	6	6

Semifinals
1	(Australia) Roy Emerson	7	6	6
3	(Australia) John Newcombe	5	4	1
4	(Australia) Tony Roche	4	6	7
2	(Australia) Fred Stolle	6	8	9

Final
1	(Australia) Roy Emerson	7	2	6	7	6
2	(Australia) Fred Stolle	9	6	4	5	1

=== Earlier rounds ===
==== Section 1 ====
First round
(Australia) Barclay	6	7	6
(United Kingdom) Matheson	2	5	2
(United Kingdom) Wooldridge	6	6	6
(Australia) Sherriff	3	4	3
15	(France) Jauffret	6	6	6
(Australia) Richards	4	4	3
11	(Australia) Phillips-Moore	6	6	6
(Australia) Reid	3	1	0
(Australia) Cottrill	6	6	6
(United Kingdom) Bovett	2	1	0
(Spain) Gisbert	6	6	6
(Australia) Keller	4	3	1

Second round
1	(Australia) Emerson	6	6	6
(Australia) Barclay	0	0	1
(United Kingdom) Wooldridge	1	3	2
15	(France) Jauffret	6	6	6
11	(Australia) Phillips-Moore	6	6	6
(Australia) Cottrill	2	0	0
(Spain) Gisbert	4	6	6	6
8	(Netherlands) Okker	6	3	1	3

Third round
1	(Australia) Emerson	6	6	6
15	(France) Jauffret	4	2	1
11	(Australia) Phillips-Moore	6	4	6	5	5
(Spain) Gisbert	4	6	1	7	7

Quarterfinals
1	(Australia) Emerson	6	6	6
(Spain) Gisbert	3	3	1

==== Section 2 ====
First round
(Australia) Fraser	6	6	4	6
(Australia) Asai	0	2	6	3
(France) Goven	6	6	6
(Australia) Beers	1	3	2
13	(United Kingdom) Stilwell	4	9	7	6
(Australia) Walker	6	7	5	4
10	(Australia) Bowrey	6	6	9
(Japan) Watanabe	2	2	7
(Australia) Coghlan	4	6	6	6
(Australia) Penberthy	6	3	3	3
(Australia) Bowman	6	6	6
(Australia) Senior	4	4	3

Second round
3	(Australia) Newcombe	7	6	6	6
(Australia) Fraser	9	4	2	4
(France) Goven	6	6	3	6	6
13	(United Kingdom) Stilwell	2	3	6	8	3
10	(Australia) Bowrey	6	6	6	6
(Australia) Coghlan	3	3	8	0
(Australia) Bowman	8	2	6
6	(France) Barthès	10	6	8

Third round
3	(Australia) Newcombe	6	6	6
(France) Goven	4	2	2
10	(Australia) Bowrey	6	6	10
6	(France) Barthès	4	2	8

Quarterfinals
3	(Australia) Newcombe	6	4	2	6	6
10	(Australia) Bowrey	2	6	6	3	4

==== Section 3 ====
First round
(South Africa) Zeeman	4	7	4	6	9
(Australia) Musgrave	6	5	6	4	7
(Australia) Stephens	6	7	6	6
(Japan) Motoi	4	9	3	4
(Australia) McKenzie	2	6	6	3	12
12	(Australia) Jacques	6	4	4	6	10
(Australia) Stone	8	6	3	9
16	(Netherlands) Hajer	6	2	6	7
(Sweden) Holm	6	8	9
(Australia) Pollard	3	6	7
(Australia) Russo	7	4	6	6
(Australia) Broom	5	6	3	4

Second round
5	(France) Darmon	6	8	6
(South Africa) Zeeman	1	6	1
(Australia) Stephens	6	6	6
(Australia) McKenzie	2	1	2
(Australia) Stone	7	3	3
(Sweden) Holm	9	6	6
(Australia) Russo	4	3	3
4	(Australia) Roche	6	6	6

Third round
5	(France) Darmon	6	7	6
(Australia) Stephens	2	5	4
(Sweden) Holm	6	4	2
4	(Australia) Roche	8	6	6

Quarterfinals
5	(France) Darmon	8	2	3	0
4	(Australia) Roche	6	6	6	6

==== Section 4 ====
First round
(Australia) Pearce	4	6	6	6
(Japan) Konishi	6	2	3	0
(Australia) Hillebrand	6	7	6	6
(Australia) Keldie	3	9	3	4
9	(Australia) Davidson	7	6	6
(Chile) Pabst	5	2	4
14	(Japan) Ishiguro	6	9	6
(Australia) Stubs	4	7	2
(France) Grinda	6	6	6
(Australia) Kearney	4	4	1
(Australia) Sharpe	3
(Australia) Holland	2	r

Second round
7	(New Zealand) Gerrard	6	6	6
(Australia) Pearce	1	4	0
(Australia) Hillebrand	2	1	2
9	(Australia) Davidson	6	6	6
14	(Japan) Ishiguro	7	6	6	4	6
(France) Grinda	9	4	2	6	4
(Australia) Sharpe	2	2	1
2	(Australia) Stolle	6	6	6

Third round
7	(New Zealand) Gerrard	4	8	6
9	(Australia) Davidson	6	10	8
14	(Japan) Ishiguro	2	2	4
2	(Australia) Stolle	6	6	6

Quarterfinals
9	(Australia) Davidson	6	0	0	3
2	(Australia) Stolle	3	6	6	6

Preceded by 1964 U.S. National Championships	Grand Slam men's singles	Succeeded by 1965 French Championships
