= 1964 Australian Championships – Men's singles =

Men's singles
- 1964 Australian Championships

Final
- Champion: (Australia) Roy Emerson
- Runner-up: (Australia) Fred Stolle
- Score: 6–3, 6–4, 6-2

Details
- Draw: 48
- Seeds: 12

Events
Singles	men	women
Doubles	men	women
- Australian Championships

First-seeded Roy Emerson defeated Fred Stolle 6–3, 6–4, 6–2 in the final to win the men's singles tennis title at the 1964 Australian Championships.

== Seeds ==
The seeded players are listed below. Roy Emerson is the champion; others show the round in which they were eliminated.

1. (Australia) Roy Emerson (champion)
2. (Australia) Fred Stolle (finalist)
3. (Australia) John Newcombe (quarterfinals)
4. (Australia) Ken Fletcher (semifinals)
5. (Australia) Bob Hewitt (third round)
6. (Australia) Martin Mulligan (semifinals)
7. (Australia) Tony Roche (quarterfinals)
8. (Australia) Owen Davidson (quarterfinals)
9. (United Kingdom) Mike Sangster (quarterfinals)
10. (United Kingdom) Roger Taylor (third round)
11. (United States) Eugene Scott (second round)
12. (United Kingdom) Graham Stilwell (third round)

== Draw ==
=== Key ===
- Q = Qualifier
- WC = Wild card
- LL = Lucky loser
- r = Retired

=== Finals ===
Quarterfinals
1	(Australia) Roy Emerson	7	6	6
7	(Australia) Tony Roche	5	2	2
3	(Australia) John Newcombe	6	4	3	8	6
6	(Australia) Martin Mulligan	3	6	6	6	8
9	(United Kingdom) Mike Sangster	15	6	0	1
4	(Australia) Ken Fletcher	17	4	6	6
8	(Australia) Owen Davidson	6	5	3	2
2	(Australia) Fred Stolle	1	7	6	6

Semifinals
1	(Australia) Roy Emerson	6	9	6
6	(Australia) Martin Mulligan	2	7	4
4	(Australia) Ken Fletcher	4	6	3	6	3
2	(Australia) Fred Stolle	6	3	6	3	6

Final
1	(Australia) Roy Emerson	6	6	6
2	(Australia) Fred Stolle	3	4	2

=== Earlier rounds ===
==== Section 1 ====
First round
(Australia) Crealy	3	4	10	7	9
(Australia) Cooper	6	6	8	5	7
(Australia) Zelinski
(Australia) Waugh	w/o
(Israel) Davidman	6	6	6
(United Kingdom) Bovett	0	0	2
(Australia) Jacques
(Australia) Bullock	w/o

Second round
1	(Australia) Emerson	6	6	6
(Australia) Crealy	4	2	1
(Australia) Bowman	9	6	6	6
(Australia) Zelinski	11	1	2	1
7	(Australia) Roche	6	6	6
(Israel) Davidman	2	4	4
12	(United Kingdom) Stilwell	4	6	10	6	6
(Australia) Jacques	6	8	8	2	3

Third round
1	(Australia) Emerson	6	7	6
(Australia) Bowman	4	5	4
7	(Australia) Roche	6	4	4	6	6
12	(United Kingdom) Stilwell	2	6	6	3	2

Quarterfinals
1	(Australia) Emerson	7	6	6
7	(Australia) Roche	5	2	2

==== Section 2 ====
First round
(Australia) Baulch
(Australia) O'Brien	w/o
(Australia) Geraghty	6	6	6
(Australia) Beers	2	2	3
(Australia) Coghlan	4	7	1	6	6
(Australia) Guse	6	5	6	3	1
(Australia) Cruth
(Australia) Shepherd	w/o

Second round
3	(Australia) Newcombe	10	6	6
(Australia) Baulch	8	4	0
(Jamaica) Russell	4	5	4
(Australia) Geraghty	6	7	6
6	(Australia) Mulligan	6	7	4	6
(Australia) Coghlan	2	5	6	3
10	(United Kingdom) Taylor	6	7	6
(Australia) Cruth	1	5	2

Third round
3	(Australia) Newcombe	6	6
(Australia) Geraghty	1	4
6	(Australia) Mulligan	6	16	4	6
10	(United Kingdom) Taylor	4	14	6	2

Quarterfinals
3	(Australia) Newcombe	6	4	3	8	6
6	(Australia) Mulligan	3	6	6	6	8

==== Section 3 ====
First round
(Australia) Ruffels	6	8	6
(Australia) Bothwell	3	6	1
(Australia) Decker	6	6	6
(Australia) Walker	2	1	2
(Australia) Lockington
(Australia) Jardine	w/o
(Australia) Sherriff	6	6	6
(Australia) Morrell	1	0	3

Second round
(Australia) Ruffels	4	4	6	2
9	(United Kingdom) Sangster	6	6	3	6
(Australia) Decker	1	4	3
5	(Australia) Hewitt	6	6	6
(Australia) Lockington	0	1	0
(Australia) Bowrey	6	6	6
(Australia) Sherriff	6	3	4	4
4	(Australia) Fletcher	3	6	6	6

Third round
9	(United Kingdom) Sangster	6	16	8	4	6
5	(Australia) Hewitt	8	14	6	6	4
(Australia) Bowrey	3	4	4
4	(Australia) Fletcher	6	6	6

Quarterfinals
9	(United Kingdom) Sangster	15	6	0	1
4	(Australia) Fletcher	17	4	6	6

==== Section 4 ====
First round
(Australia) Phillips-Moore	6	6	6
(United Kingdom) Matthews	3	2	4
(Australia) Clayton	6	7	10
(Australia) Moore	2	5	8
(Australia) Sherriff	7	6	6	8
(South Vietnam) Luu	9	4	4	6
(Australia) Brien	6	5	6	11
(Australia) Richards	3	7	4	9

Second round
(Australia) Phillips-Moore	8	6	6
11	(United States) Scott	6	4	2
(Australia) Clayton	6	2	3
8	(Australia) Davidson	8	6	6
(Australia) Sherriff
(Australia) Sharpe	w/o
(Australia) Brien	3	6	4	2
2	(Australia) Stolle	6	4	6	6

Third round
(Australia) Phillips-Moore	0	6	4	6	4
8	(Australia) Davidson	6	4	6	4	6
(Australia) Sherriff	3	3	2
2	(Australia) Stolle	6	6	6

Quarterfinals
8	(Australia) Davidson	6	5	3	2
2	(Australia) Stolle	1	7	6	6

Preceded by 1963 U.S. National Championships	Grand Slam men's singles	Succeeded by 1964 French Championships
