= 1966 in tennis =

This page covers all the important events in the sport of tennis in 1966. It provides the results of notable tournaments throughout the year on both the men's and women's ILTF tennis circuits.

== Australian Open ==
Category	Champion(s)	Finalist(s)	Score
Men's singles	(Australia) Roy Emerson	(United States) Arthur Ashe	6–4, 6–8, 6–2, 6–3
Women's singles	(Australia) Margaret Smith	(United States) Nancy Richey	walkover
Men's doubles	(Australia) Roy Emerson (Australia) Fred Stolle	(Australia) John Newcombe (Australia) Tony Roche	7–9, 6–3, 6–8, 14–12, 12–10
Women's doubles	(United States) Carole Graebner (United States) Nancy Richey	(Australia) Margaret Smith (Australia) Lesley Turner	6–4, 7–5
Mixed doubles	(Australia) Judy Tegart (Australia) Tony Roche	(Australia) Robyn Ebbern (Australia) Bill Bowrey	6–1, 6–3

== French Open ==
Category	Champion(s)	Finalist(s)	Score
Men's singles	(Australia) Tony Roche	(Hungary) István Gulyás	6–1, 6–4, 7–5
Women's singles	(United Kingdom) Ann Jones	(United States) Nancy Richey	6–3, 6–1
Men's doubles	(United States) Clark Graebner (United States) Dennis Ralston	(Romania) Ilie Năstase (Romania) Ion Țiriac	6–3, 6–3, 6–0
Women's doubles	(Australia) Margaret Smith (Australia) Judy Tegart	(Australia) Jill Blackman (Australia) Fay Toyne	4–6, 6–1, 6–1
Mixed doubles	(South Africa) Annette Van Zyl (South Africa) Frew McMillan	(United Kingdom) Ann Jones (United States) Clark Graebner	1–6, 6–3, 6–2

== Wimbledon ==
Category	Champion(s)	Finalist(s)	Score
Men's singles	(Spain) Manuel Santana	(United States) Dennis Ralston	6–4, 11–9, 6–4
Women's singles	(United States) Billie Jean King	(Brazil) Maria Bueno	6–3, 3–6, 6–1
Men's doubles	(Australia) Ken Fletcher (Australia) John Newcombe	(Australia) Bill Bowrey (Australia) Owen Davidson	6–3, 6–4, 3–6, 6–3
Women's doubles	(Brazil) Maria Bueno (United States) Nancy Richey	(Australia) Margaret Smith (Australia) Judy Tegart	6–3, 4–6, 6–4
Mixed doubles	(Australia) Ken Fletcher (Australia) Margaret Smith	(United States) Dennis Ralston (United States) Billie Jean King	4–6, 6–3, 6–3

== US Open ==
Category	Champion(s)	Finalist(s)	Score
Men's singles	(Australia) Fred Stolle	(Australia) John Newcombe	4–6, 12–10, 6–3, 6–4
Women's singles	(Brazil) Maria Bueno	(United States) Nancy Richey	6–3, 6–1
Men's doubles	(Australia) Roy Emerson (Australia) Fred Stolle	(United States) Clark Graebner (United States) Dennis Ralston	6–4, 6–4, 6–4
Women's doubles	(Brazil) Maria Bueno (United States) Nancy Richey	(United States) Rosie Casals (United States) Billie Jean King	6–3, 6–4
Mixed doubles	(United States) Donna Floyd-Fales (Australia) Owen Davidson	(United States) Carol Hanks Aucamp (United States) Ed Rubinoff	6–1, 6–3
