= 1961 Australian Championships – Men's singles =

Men's singles
- 1961 Australian Championships

Final
- Champion: (Australia) Roy Emerson
- Runner-up: (Australia) Rod Laver
- Score: 1–6, 6–3, 7–5, 6–4

Details
- Draw: 44
- Seeds: 12

Events
Singles	men	women
Doubles	men	women
- Australian Championships

Second-seeded Roy Emerson defeated Rod Laver 1–6, 6–3, 7–5, 6–4 in the final to win the men's singles tennis title at the 1961 Australian Championships.

== Seeds ==
The seeded players are listed below. Roy Emerson is the champion; others show the round in which they were eliminated.

1. (Australia) Rod Laver (finalist)
2. (Australia) Roy Emerson (champion)
3. (Australia) Bob Mark (third round)
4. (Australia) Bob Hewitt (third round)
5. (United Kingdom) Mike Sangster (quarterfinals)
6. (West Germany) Christian Kuhnke (quarterfinals)
7. (Australia) Bob Howe (third round)
8. (Australia) Fred Stolle (semifinals)
9. (Australia) Wayne Reid (third round)
10. (Australia) Ken Fletcher (quarterfinals)
11. (Italy) Sergio Tacchini (second round)
12. (Australia) Barry Phillips-Moore (semifinals)

== Draw ==
=== Key ===
- Q = Qualifier
- WC = Wild card
- LL = Lucky loser
- r = Retired

=== Finals ===
Quarterfinals
1	(Australia) Rod Laver	6	2
10	(Australia) Ken Fletcher	2	4^{r}
12	(Australia) Barry Phillips-Moore	5	6	6	6
6	(West Germany) Christian Kuhnke	7	3	2	3
5	(United Kingdom) Mike Sangster	3	4	3
8	(Australia) Fred Stolle	6	6	6
(Australia) John Pearce	1	2	3
2	(Australia) Roy Emerson	6	6	6

Semifinals
1	(Australia) Rod Laver	6	6	6
12	(Australia) Barry Phillips-Moore	2	2	4
8	(Australia) Fred Stolle	6	2	5
2	(Australia) Roy Emerson	8	6	7

Final
1	(Australia) Rod Laver	6	3	5	4
2	(Australia) Roy Emerson	1	6	7	6

=== Earlier rounds ===
==== Section 1 ====
First round

Second round
1	(Australia) Laver	6	6	6
(Australia) O'Kane	2	3	0
(Malaysia) Tan	1	2	1
(Australia) Coghlan	6	6	6
10	(Australia) Fletcher	6	6	3	6
(Australia) Ryan	3	2	6	1
(Australia) Shapter	6	8	8	4	6
(Australia) Hearnden	3	10	6	6	1

Third round
1	(Australia) Laver	6	6	9
(Australia) Coghlan	4	1	7
10	(Australia) Fletcher	6	6	6
(Australia) Shapter	3	2	3

Quarterfinals
1	(Australia) Laver	6	2
10	(Australia) Fletcher	2	4^{r}

==== Section 2 ====
First round
(Australia) Nette	6	6	6
(Australia) Pearson	3	0	1
12	(Australia) Phillips-Moore	6	3	6	6
(Australia) French	2	6	2	3
4	(Australia) Hewitt	6	7	6
(Australia) Fraser	1	5	1
(United Kingdom) Hann	6	2	6	7
(Australia) Pares	1	6	2	5
(Australia) Hughes	6	6	8	6
(Australia) Johnson	2	3	10	1
6	(West Germany) Kuhnke	6	1	6	6
(Australia) McPherson	4	6	3	0

Second round
7	(Australia) Howe	6	6	7
(Australia) Potter	1	4	5
(Australia) Nette	5	2	2
12	(Australia) Phillips-Moore	7	6	6
4	(Australia) Hewitt	6	6	0	7
(United Kingdom) Hann	4	4	6	5
(Australia) Hughes	6	6	4
6	(West Germany) Kuhnke	8	8	6

Third round
7	(Australia) Howe	2	9	6	6
12	(Australia) Phillips-Moore	6	11	3	8
4	(Australia) Hewitt	1	4	6	3
6	(West Germany) Kuhnke	6	6	1	6

Quarterfinals
12	(Australia) Phillips-Moore	5	6	6	6
6	(West Germany) Kuhnke	7	3	2	3

==== Section 3 ====
First round
5	(United Kingdom) Sangster	6	6	6
(Australia) McKenzie	2	2	2
(Australia) Stubs	6	6	8
(Malaysia) Azman	0	1	6
(Australia) Mulligan	6	6	6
(Australia) Graham-Jones	3	2	2
3	(Australia) Mark	6	6	6
(Australia) Hillebrand	1	4	0
11	(Italy) Tacchini	6	6	6
(Australia) Millen	1	1	0
(Australia) Tobin	6	6	6
(Australia) Shepherd	3	3	2

Second round
5	(United Kingdom) Sangster	3	10	6	2	6
(Australia) Stubs	6	8	4	6	2
(Australia) Mulligan	3	3	4
3	(Australia) Mark	6	6	6
11	(Italy) Tacchini	5	2	5
(Australia) Tobin	7	6	7
(Australia) Reid	13	4	3
8	(Australia) Stolle	15	6	6

Third round
5	(United Kingdom) Sangster
3	(Australia) Mark	w/o
(Australia) Tobin	3	3	3
8	(Australia) Stolle	6	6	6

Quarterfinals
5	(United Kingdom) Sangster	3	4	3
8	(Australia) Stolle	6	6	6

==== Section 4 ====
First round

Second round
(Australia) Pearce	6	6	6
(Australia) Gibson	4	3	4
(Australia) Holland	7	1	3
9	(Australia) Reid	9	6	6
(Australia) Kearney	4	6	6	6
(Australia) Stephens	6	4	2	0
(Australia) Hicks	1	1	2
2	(Australia) Emerson	6	6	6

Third round
(Australia) Pearce	6	6	6
9	(Australia) Reid	2	2	0
(Australia) Kearney	1	2	7
2	(Australia) Emerson	6	6	9

Quarterfinals
(Australia) Pearce	1	2	3
2	(Australia) Emerson	6	6	6

Preceded by 1960 U.S. National Championships	Grand Slam men's singles	Succeeded by 1961 French Championships
