= 1960 Australian Championships – Men's singles =

Men's singles
- 1960 Australian Championships

Final
- Champion: (Australia) Rod Laver
- Runner-up: (Australia) Neale Fraser
- Score: 5–7, 3–6, 6–3, 8–6, 8–6

Details
- Draw: 32
- Seeds: 8

Events
Singles	men	women
Doubles	men	women
- Australian Championships

Third-seeded Rod Laver defeated top seed Neale Fraser 5–7, 3–6, 6–3, 8–6, 8–6 in the final to win the men's singles tennis title at the 1960 Australian Championships. Laver saved a championship point in the fourth set.

== Seeds ==
The seeded players are listed below. Rod Laver is the champion; others show the round in which they were eliminated.

1. (Australia) Neale Fraser (finalist)
2. (Australia) Roy Emerson (semifinals)
3. (Australia) Rod Laver (champion)
4. (Australia) Bob Mark (quarterfinals)
5. (Australia) Martin Mulligan (quarterfinals)
6. (Australia) Bob Hewitt (semifinals)
7. (Australia) Bob Howe (second round)
8. (South Africa) Trevor Fancutt (second round)

== Draw ==
=== Key ===
- Q = Qualifier
- WC = Wild card
- LL = Lucky loser
- r = Retired

=== Finals ===
Quarterfinals
1	(Australia) Neale Fraser	4	7	6	6	6
(Australia) John Pearce	6	5	3	8	2
4	(Australia) Bob Mark	10	2	1
6	(Australia) Bob Hewitt	12	6	6
(Australia) Ken Fletcher	3	6	6	4
3	(Australia) Rod Laver	6	8	4	6
5	(Australia) Martin Mulligan	4	1
2	(Australia) Roy Emerson	6	6

Semifinals
1	(Australia) Neale Fraser	8	6	11
6	(Australia) Bob Hewitt	6	4	9
3	(Australia) Rod Laver	4	6	9	3	7
2	(Australia) Roy Emerson	6	1	7	6	5

Final
1	(Australia) Neale Fraser	7	6	3	6	6
3	(Australia) Rod Laver	5	3	6	8	8

=== Earlier rounds ===
==== Section 1 ====
First round
1	(Australia) Fraser	6	6	6
(Australia) Knox	2	2	0
(Australia) Hughes	8	2	6	6	6
(Australia) Stolle	10	6	4	2	3
8	(South Africa) Fancutt	3	6	6	4	6
(Australia) Shapter	6	1	2	6	3
(Australia) Pearce	6	6	6
(Australia) Moore	2	2	0
4	(Australia) Mark	6	6	6
(Australia) Newcombe	1	2	2
(Australia) Tobin	7	6	3	4	6
(Australia) Gibson	5	1	6	6	4
6	(Australia) Hewitt	4	6	6	6
(Australia) McPherson	6	4	2	2
(Australia) Gorman	6	3	6	9
(Australia) Pares	4	6	3	7

Second round
1	(Australia) Fraser	6	6	6
(Australia) Hughes	2	2	2
8	(South Africa) Fancutt	2	3	2
(Australia) Pearce	6	6	6
4	(Australia) Mark	6	6	6
(Australia) Tobin	2	2	1
6	(Australia) Hewitt	6	2	8	6
(Australia) Gorman	4	6	6	1

Quarterfinals
1	(Australia) Fraser	4	7	6	6	6
(Australia) Pearce	6	5	3	8	2
4	(Australia) Mark	12	6	6
6	(Australia) Hewitt	10	2	1

Semifinals
1	(Australia) Fraser	8	6	11
6	(Australia) Hewitt	6	4	9

==== Section 2 ====
First round
(Australia) Fletcher	6	6	3	6	6
(Australia) Lane	8	3	6	3	1
7	(Australia) Howe	6	6	6
(Australia) Graham-Jones	1	4	3
(Australia) Jacques	6	5	6	6
(Australia) Baulch	1	7	0	1
3	(Australia) Laver	6	6	6
(Australia) Stubs	2	0	1
(Australia) Shepherd	8	6	3	6	6
(Australia) Fraser	10	0	6	1	3
5	(Australia) Mulligan	6	6	6
(Australia) Patterson	0	0	0
(Australia) Coghlan	6	6	6
(Australia) Pearson	4	4	4
2	(Australia) Emerson	6	6	6
(Australia) O'Brien	2	2	2

Second round
(Australia) Fletcher	6	7	6
7	(Australia) Howe	2	5	0
(Australia) Jacques	9	3	3
3	(Australia) Laver	11	6	6
(Australia) Shepherd	5	6	5	6	8
5	(Australia) Mulligan	7	3	7	2	10
(Australia) Coghlan	0	3	3
2	(Australia) Emerson	6	6	6

Quarterfinals
(Australia) Fletcher	3	6	6	4
3	(Australia) Laver	6	8	4	6
5	(Australia) Mulligan	4	1
2	(Australia) Emerson	6	6

Semifinals
3	(Australia) Laver	4	6	9	3	7
2	(Australia) Emerson	6	1	7	6	5

Preceded by 1959 U.S. National Championships	Grand Slam men's singles	Succeeded by 1960 French Championships
