= Rob Kilderry =

Australian tennis player

Robert Kilderry
- Country (sports): Australia
- Born: 6 June 1941
- Turned pro: 1960
- Retired: 1970
- Plays: Right-handed

Singles
- Career record: 3-2
- Career titles: 1

Grand Slam singles results
- Australian Open: 3R (1962)
- Last updated on: 31 October 2016.

Robert Kilderry (born 6 June 1941) is a former Australian amateur tennis player. He reached the third round of the 1962 Australian Championships in the men's singles. He is the father of Paul Kilderry.
