= Frederick Sherriff =

Frederick Sherriff may refer to:

- Frederick Sherriff (fencer)
- Frederick Sherriff (tennis)
