= 1962 Australian Championships – Men's singles =

Men's singles
- 1962 Australian Championships

Final
- Champion: (Australia) Rod Laver
- Runner-up: (Australia) Roy Emerson
- Score: 8–6, 0–6, 6–4, 6–4

Details
- Draw: 48
- Seeds: 15

Events
| Singles | men | women |
| Doubles | men | women |
- Australian Championships

First-seeded Rod Laver defeated Roy Emerson 8–6, 0–6, 6–4, 6–4 in the final to win the men's singles tennis title at the 1962 Australian Championships.

== Seeds ==
The seeded players are listed below. Rod Laver is the champion; others show the round in which they were eliminated.

1. (Australia) Rod Laver (champion)
2. (Australia) Roy Emerson (finalist)
3. (Australia) Neale Fraser (semifinals)
4. (Australia) Bob Hewitt (semifinals)
5. (Australia) Fred Stolle (quarterfinals)
6. (Australia) Ken Fletcher (third round)
7. (Australia) John Newcombe (quarterfinals)
8. (Australia) John Fraser (second round)
9. (Socialist Federal Republic of Yugoslavia) Boro Jovanović (second round)
10. (West Germany) Wilhelm Bungert (quarterfinals)
11. (Socialist Federal Republic of Yugoslavia) Nikola Pilić (second round)
12. (India) Premjit Lall (third round)
13. (India) Jaidip Mukerjea (third round)
14. (West Germany) Ingo Buding (second round)
15. (United Kingdom) Roger Taylor (third round)

== Draw ==
=== Key ===
- Q = Qualifier
- WC = Wild card
- LL = Lucky loser
- r = Retired

=== Finals ===
Quarterfinals
1 | (Australia) Rod Laver | 6 | 9 | 6
(Australia) Owen Davidson | 4 | 7 | 4
4 | (Australia) Bob Hewitt | 8 | 6 | 4 | 6
10 | (West Germany) Wilhelm Bungert | 6 | 2 | 6 | 4
5 | (Australia) Fred Stolle | 2 | 6 | 2 | 3
3 | (Australia) Neale Fraser | 6 | 4 | 6 | 6
7 | (Australia) John Newcombe | 9 | 1 | 2 | 2
2 | (Australia) Roy Emerson | 7 | 6 | 6 | 6

Semifinals
1 | (Australia) Rod Laver | 6 | 4 | 6 | 7
4 | (Australia) Bob Hewitt | 1 | 6 | 4 | 5
3 | (Australia) Neale Fraser | 4 | 3 | 1
2 | (Australia) Roy Emerson | 6 | 6 | 6

Final
1 | (Australia) Rod Laver | 8 | 0 | 6 | 6
2 | (Australia) Roy Emerson | 6 | 6 | 4 | 4

=== Earlier rounds ===
==== Section 1 ====
First round
(Australia) Sherriff | 6 | 8 | 6
(Australia) Hession | 2 | 6 | 2
(Australia) Pares | 6 | 6 | 7
(Australia) Kendall | 4 | 4 | 5
(Australia) Brent | 6 | 6 | 8
(Australia) McManus | 4 | 4 | 6
(Australia) Davidson | 6 | 3 | 7 | 6
(Australia) Anderson | 2 | 6 | 5 | 3

Second round
1 | (Australia) Laver | 8 | 6 | 6
(Australia) Sherriff | 6 | 2 | 4
(Australia) Woodcock | 3 | 4 | 2
(Australia) Pares | 6 | 6 | 6
8 | (Australia) Fraser | 6 | 6 | 8 | 7 | 1
(Australia) Brent | 3 | 2 | 10 | 9 | 6
11 | (Socialist Federal Republic of Yugoslavia) Pilić | 6 | 2 | 5
(Australia) Davidson | 8 | 6 | 7

Third round
1 | (Australia) Laver | 10 | 18 | 7 | 7
(Australia) Pares | 8 | 16 | 9 | 5
(Australia) Brent | 3 | 3 | 2
(Australia) Davidson | 6 | 6 | 6

Quarterfinals
1 | (Australia) Laver | 6 | 9 | 6
(Australia) Davidson | 4 | 7 | 4

==== Section 2 ====
First round
(Australia) Shapter | 6 | 14 | 8
(Australia) Figg | 2 | 12 | 6
(Australia) Lane | 6 | 6 | 6
(New Zealand) McDonald | 4 | 3 | 4
(Australia) Clayton | 6 | 6 | 6
(Australia) French | 3 | 2 | 1
(Australia) Coghlan | 6 | 6 | 4 | 6
(Australia) Sherriff | 2 | 0 | 6 | 2

Second round
4 | (Australia) Hewitt | 8 | 7 | 6
(Australia) Shapter | 6 | 5 | 2
14 | (West Germany) Buding | 2 | 6 | 9 | 2
(Australia) Lane | 6 | 8 | 7 | 6
6 | (Australia) Fletcher | 6 | 6 | 13
(Australia) Clayton | 0 | 2 | 11
10 | (West Germany) Bungert | 6 | 6 | 6
(Australia) Coghlan | 4 | 2 | 1

Third round
4 | (Australia) Hewitt | 3 | 6 | 7 | 6
(Australia) Lane | 6 | 3 | 5 | 1
6 | (Australia) Fletcher | 6 | 3 | 5 | 6 | 8
10 | (West Germany) Bungert | 3 | 6 | 7 | 4 | 10

Quarterfinals
4 | (Australia) Hewitt | 8 | 6 | 4 | 6
10 | (West Germany) Bungert | 6 | 2 | 6 | 4

==== Section 3 ====
First round
(Australia) Kilderry | 6 | 7 | 6
(Australia) Kelso | 4 | 5 | 2
(Australia) Hay | 6 | 6 | 6
(Sri Lanka) Kumara | 2 | 2 | 1
(Australia) Bowrey | 6 | 6 | 6
(Australia) Moore | 3 | 2 | 3
(Australia) Geraghty | 6 | 4 | 6 | 6
(Australia) Christopherson | 0 | 6 | 3 | 3

Second round
(Australia) Kilderry | 7 | 6 | 6
9 | (Socialist Federal Republic of Yugoslavia) Jovanović | 5 | 0 | 0
(Australia) Hay | 3 | 2 | 3
5 | (Australia) Stolle | 6 | 6 | 6
(Australia) Bowrey | 2 | 3 | 6 | 4
15 | (United Kingdom) Taylor | 6 | 6 | 4 | 6
(Australia) Geraghty | 4 | 2 | 9 | 6 | 6
3 | (Australia) Fraser | 6 | 6 | 7 | 2 | 8

Third round
(Australia) Kilderry | 3 | 2 | 4 | 8
5 | (Australia) Stolle | 6 | 6 | 6 | 10
15 | (United Kingdom) Taylor | 1 | 4 | 8
3 | (Australia) Fraser | 6 | 6 | 10

Quarterfinals
5 | (Australia) Stolle | 2 | 6 | 2 | 3
3 | (Australia) Fraser | 6 | 4 | 6 | 6

==== Section 4 ====
First round
(Australia) Shepherd | 6 | 1 | 6 | 6
(Australia) McPherson | 4 | 6 | 4 | 4
(Australia) Keller | 6 | 6 | 6
(Canada) Thomson | 1 | 0 | 0
(Australia) Callaghan | 6 | 6 | 6
(Australia) O'Shea | 0 | 1 | 2
(Australia) O'Brien | 2 | 6 | 6 | 12
(Australia) Knox | 6 | 2 | 2 | 10

Second round
(Australia) Shepherd | 6 | 7 | 3 | 4 | 1
12 | (India) Lall | 3 | 5 | 6 | 6 | 6
(Australia) Keller | 2 | 2 | 8
7 | (Australia) Newcombe | 6 | 6 | 10
(Australia) Callaghan | 6 | 1 | 3 | 3
13 | (India) Mukerjea | 4 | 6 | 6 | 6
(Australia) O'Brien | 3 | 3 | 1
2 | (Australia) Emerson | 6 | 6 | 6

Third round
12 | (India) Lall | 3 | 4 | 8
7 | (Australia) Newcombe | 6 | 6 | 10
13 | (India) Mukerjea | 2 | 4 | 3
2 | (Australia) Emerson | 6 | 6 | 6

Quarterfinals
7 | (Australia) Newcombe | 9 | 1 | 2 | 2
2 | (Australia) Emerson | 7 | 6 | 6 | 6

| Preceded by 1961 U.S. National Championships | Grand Slam men's singles | Succeeded by 1962 French Championships |
