= Peter Keller (tennis) =

Australian tennis player

- Born: 19 October 1944 (age 80); Clunes, Victoria, Australia
- Tennis career
- Country (sports): Australia
- Residence: Ballarat, Victoria, Australia

Singles

Grand Slam singles results
- Australian Open: First round (1962); Second round (1962, 1965)

Peter Keller (born 19 October 1944 in Clunes, Victoria) is a former Australian professional tennis player. He reached the first with J. Thomson and second round with John Newcombe at the 1962 Australian Championships in the men's singles and again in 1965 with Juan Gisbert Sr. He was ranked as Australian number two in the 1970s. He became active between early to late 1960s.

Keller was still competing at age 73, finishing second to Camina Borda in the Super-Senior World Individual Championships 70s in 2017 despite having undergone quintuple bypass heart surgery earlier that year.

Keller is in the Ballarat Sports Hall of Fame.
