= 1962 Australian Championships – Women's singles =

Women's singles
- 1962 Australian Championships

Final
- Champion: (Australia) Margaret Smith
- Runner-up: (Australia) Jan Lehane
- Score: 6–0, 6–2

Details
- Draw: 48
- Seeds: 16

Events
Singles	men	women
Doubles	men	women
- Australian Championships

First-seeded Margaret Smith defeated Jan Lehane 6–0, 6–2 in the final to win the women's singles tennis title at the 1962 Australian Championships.

== Seeds ==
The seeded players are listed below. Margaret Smith is the champion; others show the round in which they were eliminated.

1. (Australia) Margaret Smith (champion)
2. (United States) Darlene Hard (quarterfinals)
3. (Mexico) Yola Ramírez (semifinals)
4. (Australia) Lesley Turner (quarterfinals)
5. (Australia) Jan Lehane (finalist)
6. (Australia) Mary Reitano (semifinals)
7. (Australia) Robyn Ebbern (third round)
8. (Australia) Madonna Schacht (third round)
9. (Australia) Judy Tegart (quarterfinals)
10. (Australia) Mary Bevis Hawton (third round)
11. (Australia) Lorraine Coghlan (third round)
12. (Australia) Norma Marsh (quarterfinals)
13. (Australia) Jill Blackman (third round)
14. (Australia) Fay Toyne (third round)
15. (Australia) Beverley Rae (third round)
16. (Australia) Dorothy Whitely (second round)

== Draw ==
=== Key ===
- Q = Qualifier
- WC = Wild card
- LL = Lucky loser
- r = Retired

=== Finals ===
Quarterfinals
1	(Australia) Margaret Smith	6	7
9	(Australia) Judy Tegart	2	5
3	(Mexico) Yola Ramírez	5	6	6
12	(Australia) Norma Marsh	7	0	3
6	(Australia) Mary Reitano	6	1	6
4	(Australia) Lesley Turner	1	6	2
5	(Australia) Jan Lehane	7	6
2	(United States) Darlene Hard	5	4

Semifinals
1	(Australia) Margaret Smith	6	6
3	(Mexico) Yola Ramírez	2	1
6	(Australia) Mary Reitano	2	6	4
5	(Australia) Jan Lehane	6	2	6

Finals
1	(Australia) Margaret Smith	6	6
5	(Australia) Jan Lehane	0	2

=== Earlier rounds ===
==== Section 1 ====
First round
(Australia) Robinson	6	6
(Australia) McClenaughan	4	3
(Australia) Fenton	6	6
(Australia) Wrench	1	4
(Australia) Thiele	6	6
(Australia) Sherriff	4	1
(Australia) Bellamy	7	6	6
(Australia) Paterson	9	2	4

Second round
1	(Australia) Smith	6	6
(Australia) Robinson	0	2
16	(Australia) Whitely	6	5
(Australia) Fenton	8	7
7	(Australia) Ebbern	6	6
(Australia) Thiele	2	4
9	(Australia) Tegart	6	6
(Australia) Bellamy	4	2

Third round
1	(Australia) Smith	6	6
(Australia) Fenton	1	1
7	(Australia) Ebbern	5	4
9	(Australia) Tegart	7	6

Quarterfinals
1	(Australia) Smith	6	7
9	(Australia) Tegart	2	5

==== Section 2 ====
First round
(Australia) McLean	6	6
(Australia) Thomas	3	3
(Australia) Hopman	8	6
(Australia) Easy	6	3
(Australia) Harris	6	4	6
(Australia) Gibson	3	6	4
(Australia) Ross	6	6
(Australia) Sherriff	3	1

Second round
3	(Mexico) Ramírez	6	6
(Australia) McLean	0	1
13	(Australia) Blackman	6	6
(Australia) Hopman	2	2
8	(Australia) Schacht	6	6
(Australia) Harris	1	3
12	(Australia) Marsh	6	6
(Australia) Ross	4	2

Third round
3	(Mexico) Ramírez	8	6
13	(Australia) Blackman	6	2
8	(Australia) Schacht	6	3	8
12	(Australia) Marsh	4	6	10

Quarterfinals
3	(Mexico) Ramírez	5	6	6
12	(Australia) Marsh	7	0	3

==== Section 3 ====
First round
(Australia) Starr	6	6
(New Zealand) Melrose	1	1
(Australia) Newman	5	6	6
(Australia) Don	7	4	3
(United Kingdom) Trewby	6	6
(Australia) Schofield	0	2
(Australia) Plummer	6	7
(Australia) Pinch	3	5

Second round
(Australia) Starr	7	4
11	(Australia) Coghlan	9	6
(Australia) Newman	3	6	4
6	(Australia) Reitano	6	4	6
(United Kingdom) Trewby	6	3	3
14	(Australia) Toyne	2	6	6
(Australia) Plummer	0	0
4	(Australia) Turner	6	6

Third round
11	(Australia) Coghlan	3	1
6	(Australia) Reitano	6	6
14	(Australia) Toyne	7	1	3
4	(Australia) Turner	5	6	6

Quarterfinals
6	(Australia) Reitano	6	1	6
4	(Australia) Turner	1	6	2

==== Section 4 ====
First round
(Australia) Dening	6	6
(Australia) Craig	4	4
(Australia) Wicks	6	6
(Australia) Blackburne	1	1
(Australia) Plaisted	6	6
(Australia) O'Neill	4	4
(Australia) Toohey	6	6
(Australia) Searston	3	2

Second round
(Australia) Dening	4	6	3
10	(Australia) Hawton	6	0	6
(Australia) Wicks	6	1
5	(Australia) Lehane	8	6
(Australia) Plaisted	3	3
15	(Australia) Rae	6	6
(Australia) Toohey	0	3
2	(United States) Hard	6	6

Third round
10	(Australia) Hawton	0	1
5	(Australia) Lehane	6	6
15	(Australia) Rae	3	2
2	(United States) Hard	6	6

Quarterfinals
5	(Australia) Lehane	7	6
2	(United States) Hard	5	4

Preceded by 1961 U.S. National Championships – Women's singles	Grand Slam women's singles	Succeeded by 1962 French Championships – Women's singles
