= 1961 Australian Championships =

Tennis tournament

- Date: 20–30 January 1961
- Edition: 49th
- Category: Grand Slam (ITF)
- Surface: Grass
- Location: Melbourne, Australia
- Venue: Kooyong Lawn Tennis Club

Champions

Men's singles
- (Australia) Roy Emerson

Women's singles
- (Australia) Margaret Smith

Men's doubles
- (Australia) Rod Laver / (Australia) Bob Mark

Women's doubles
- (Australia) Margaret Smith / (Australia) Mary Carter Reitano

Mixed doubles
- (Australia) Jan Lehane / (Australia) Bob Hewitt
- Australian Championships

The 1961 Australian Championships was a tennis tournament that took place on outdoor grass courts at the Kooyong Lawn Tennis Club, Melbourne, Australia from 20 to 30 January. It was the 49th edition of the Australian Championships (now known as the Australian Open), the 14th held in Melbourne, and the first Grand Slam tournament of the year. The singles titles were taken by Roy Emerson and Margaret Smith.

== Finals ==
=== Men's singles ===
(Australia) Roy Emerson defeated (Australia) Rod Laver 1–6, 6–3, 7–5, 6–4

=== Women's singles ===
(Australia) Margaret Smith defeated (Australia) Jan Lehane 6–1, 6–4

=== Men's doubles ===
(Australia) Rod Laver / (Australia) Bob Mark defeated (Australia) Roy Emerson / (Australia) Marty Mulligan 6–3, 7–5, 3–6, 9–11, 6–2

=== Women's doubles ===
(Australia) Mary Carter Reitano / (Australia) Margaret Smith defeated (Australia) Mary Bevis Hawton / (Australia) Jan Lehane, 6–4, 3–6, 7–5

=== Mixed doubles ===
(Australia) Jan Lehane / (Australia) Bob Hewitt defeated (Australia) Mary Carter Reitano / (Australia) John Pearce, 9–7, 6–2

Preceded by 1960 U.S. National Championships	Grand Slams	Succeeded by 1961 French Championships
