= Brian Tobin (tennis) =

Australian tennis official (1930–2024)

Brian Tobin AM
- Full name: Brian Reginald Tobin
- Born: 5 December 1930 Perth, Western Australia, Australia
- Died: 22 April 2024 (aged 93)
- Int. Tennis HoF: 2003 (member page)

Singles
- Career record: 4–6

Grand Slam singles results
- Australian Open: 4R (1957, 1960, 1961)
- French Open: 1R (1964)

Doubles
- Career record: 1–3

Grand Slam doubles results
- Australian Open: SF (1963)

Brian Reginald Tobin AM (5 December 1930 – 22 April 2024) was an Australian tennis player and executive who was the president of the International Tennis Federation from 1991 to 1999. He was awarded the Order of Australia in 1986 and the Olympic Order in 1999. Apart from awards, he was inducted into the International Tennis Hall of Fame in 2003 and the Australian Tennis Hall of Fame in 2004.

== Early life and education ==
Tobin was born on 5 December 1930 in Perth, Western Australia. As a teenager, Tobin played Australian rules football before switching to tennis. He attended Christian Brothers' College, Perth for his post-secondary education.

== Career ==
As a tennis player, Tobin appeared at his first Grand Slam tournament during the 1949 Australian Championships. During the 1950s and 1960s, he played in multiple Australian Championships in singles and doubles events. Outside of Australia, Tobin participated at the 1964 French Championships where he lost in the first round.

Apart from playing tennis, Tobin was the captain of the Australian team that won the 1964 Federation Cup. He began his executive career as a member of Tennis Australia in 1965. "As President of the Lawn Tennis Association of Australia (now Tennis Australia) from 1977-1989, Brian Tobin played a pivotal role in developing the state-of-the-art Melbourne Park complex, site of the Australian Open". He later became president of the International Tennis Federation from 1991 to 1999.

== Death ==
Tobin died on 22 April 2024, at the age of 93.

== Awards and honours ==
Tobin was appointed a Member of the Order of Australia (AM) in the 1986 Australia Day Honours, "for service to tennis, particularly in the field of administration"; he was additionally awarded the Olympic Order in 1999. Tobin was first inducted into the Sport Australia Hall of Fame in 1991. Subsequent hall of fame inductions for Tobin were the International Tennis Hall of Fame in 2003 and the Australian Tennis Hall of Fame in 2004.
