= Australian Tennis Hall of Fame =

Bronze busts honouring Australian tennis players

The Australian Tennis Hall of Fame was established in 1993 by Tennis Australia under the leadership of then-president Geoff Pollard. Described by Tennis Australia as "one of the highest honours Australian tennis players can receive", inductees are recognised by the production of a bronze bust by local sculptor Barbara McLean, that is later displayed in Garden Square at Melbourne Park.

The two inaugural inductees were Rod Laver and Margaret Court, recognised in a 1993 ceremony. As of 2024, there are 47 individuals inducted. Inductions take place at the Rod Laver Arena; they are celebrated at a Hall of Fame Ball, which takes place each year on the eve of the Australian Open men's singles final.

== Inductees ==
Key
†	posthumous induction
‡	tennis administrator
*	also an inductee of the International Tennis Hall of Fame

Australian Tennis Hall of Fame inductees
Year	Image	Name	Notes	Ref(s)
1993	Rod Laver playing a backhand stroke	Rod Laver *	One of two inaugural members of the Hall of Fame. Winner of eleven singles and nine doubles majors titles, including two Grand Slams (1962 and 1969). Also represented Australia in the Davis Cup from 1958 to 1962, and again in 1973, helping Australia to four tournament wins.	
1993	Margaret Court in 1964	Margaret Court *	One of two inaugural members of the Hall of Fame. Winner of 24 singles and 40 doubles majors titles. Represented Australia in the Federation Cup from 1963 to 1965, and again from 1968 to 1970, also captaining the team on three occasions.	
1994	Roy Emerson at the net	Roy Emerson *	Winner of 12 singles and 16 doubles majors titles. Also represented Australia in the Davis Cup from 1959 to 1967.	
1994	Evonne Goolagong Cawley holding a trophy	Evonne Goolagong Cawley *	Second female player to be inducted. Winner of seven singles and six doubles majors titles. Represented Australia in the Federation Cup in 1970, from 1972 to 1976 and again in 1982. Non-playing captain of the Federation Cup team from 2002 to 2004.	
1994	Neale Fraser in 1972	Neale Fraser *	Winner of three singles and sixteen doubles majors titles. Also represented Australia in the Davis Cup from 1955 to 1963. Captained the team from 1970 to 1993, including four titles.	
1995	Lew Hoad in 1953	Lew Hoad †*	Winner of four singles and nine doubles majors titles. Also represented Australia in the Davis Cup from 1952 to 1956, including four victories in the tournament.	
1995	Ken Rosewall in 1970	Ken Rosewall *	Winner of eight singles and ten doubles majors titles. Also represented Australia in the Davis Cup from 1953 to 1956, in 1973 and in 1975, including four victories in the tournament.	
1996	Frank Sedgeman c. 1954	Frank Sedgman *	Winner of five singles and seventeen doubles majors titles. Also represented Australia in the Davis Cup from 1949 to 1952, including three victories in the tournament.	
1996	John Bromwich in 1944	John Bromwich *	Winner of two singles and seventeen doubles majors titles. Also represented Australia in the Davis Cup seven times between 1937 and 1950, including two victories in 1939 and 1950.	
1996	Norman Brookes in 1919	Norman Brookes * †	Winner of three singles and four doubles majors titles. Also represented Australia in the Davis Cup seven times between 1905 and 1920, including two victories in 1939 and 1950.	
1996	Ashley Cooper in 1958	Ashley Cooper *	Winner of four singles and four doubles majors titles. Also represented Australia in the Davis Cup twice, in 1957 and 1958, winning both tournaments.	
1996	Harry Hopman in the 1930s	Harry Hopman †*	Winner of seven doubles majors titles. Also represented Australia in the Davis Cup five times from 1928 to 1939, captaining the team in 1938 and 1939. Also non-playing captain of the team from 1950 to 1969. The Hopman Cup is named after him.	
1997	–	Fred Stolle *	Winner of two singles and fifteen doubles majors titles. Also represented Australia in the Davis Cup three times from 1964 to 1966, winning each time.	
1997	Jack Crawford in the 1930s	Jack Crawford †*	Winner of six singles and eleven doubles majors titles. Also represented Australia in the Davis Cup eight times from 1928 to 1937.	
1997		Gerald Patterson †*	Winner of three singles and six doubles majors titles. Also represented Australia in the Davis Cup six times from 1919 to 1928, and as a non-playing captain in 1946.	
1998		John Newcombe *	Winner of seven singles and nineteen doubles majors titles. Also represented Australia in the Davis Cup eight times from 1963 to 1976, and as a non-playing captain between 1994 and 2000.	
1998	John Roche in 1969	Tony Roche *	Winner of one singles and fifteen doubles majors titles. Also represented Australia in the Davis Cup eight times from 1964 to 1978, and as a coach between 1994 and 2000.	
1998	Lesley Turner Bowrey in 1964	Lesley Turner Bowrey *	The third female player to be inducted. Winner of two singles and eleven doubles majors titles. Also represented Australia in the Federation Cup four times from 1963 to 1967, and as a non-playing captain between 1994 and 2000.	
1998	Adrian Quist in the 1930s	Adrian Quist †*	Winner of three singles and fourteen doubles majors titles, including ten consecutive Australian Open men's doubles titles. Also represented Australia in the Davis Cup nine times from 1933 to 1948.	
2000		Ken McGregor *	Winner of one singles and eight doubles majors titles. Also represented Australia in the Davis Cup three times from 1950 to 1952.	
2001	Mal Anderson in 1972	Mal Anderson *	Winner of one singles and three doubles majors titles. Also represented Australia in the Davis Cup four times, in 1957, 1958, 1972 and 1973, winning twice.	
2001	Nancye Wynne Bolton in 1938	Nancye Wynne Bolton *	The fourth female player to be inducted. Winner of six singles and fourteen doubles majors titles, all at the Australian Open.	
2002	Mervyn Rose	Mervyn Rose *	Winner of two singles and five doubles majors titles. Also represented Australia in the Davis Cup six times between 1950 and 1957.	
2002	Thelma Coyne Long in 1932	Thelma Coyne Long *	The fifth female player to be inducted. Winner of two singles and seventeen doubles majors titles.	
2003	Pat Cash in 2015	Pat Cash	Winner of Wimbledon in 1987. Also represented Australia in the Davis Cup from 1983 to 1990.	
2004	–	Brian Tobin * ‡	President of the International Tennis Federation from 1991 to 1999, President of Tennis Australia from 1977 to 1989 and Federation Cup captain between 1964 and 1967.	
2006	Daphne Akhurst in 1925	Daphne Akhurst †*	The sixth female player to be inducted. Winner of five singles and nine doubles majors titles, all at the Australian Open.	
2007	–	Mark Edmondson	Winner of one singles and five doubles majors titles. Also represented Australia in the Davis Cup eight times between 1977 and 1985.	
2008	Pat Rafter in 2015	Patrick Rafter *	Winner of two singles and one doubles majors titles. Also represented Australia in the Davis Cup eight times between 1994 and 2001, captaining the team since 2011.	
2009	–	Wendy Turnbull	The seventh female player to be inducted. Winner of four doubles and five mixed doubles majors titles. Also represented Australia at the Fed Cup between 1977 and 1988, captaining the team between 1985 and 1993.	
2010	Todd Woodbridge in 2004	Todd Woodbridge *	Winner of 22 doubles majors titles. Also represented Australia in the Davis Cup 14 times between 1991 and 2005.	
2010	Mark Woodforde in 2010	Mark Woodforde *	Winner of 17 doubles majors titles. Also represented Australia in the Davis Cup ten times between 1988 and 2000.	
2011	Owen Davidson in 1988	Owen Davidson *	Winner of 12 doubles majors titles, including a mixed doubles Grand Slam in 1967.	
2012	Ken Fletcher in 1965	Ken Fletcher †	Winner of 12 doubles majors titles, including a mixed doubles Grand Slam in 1963.	
2013	–	Judy Dalton	The eighth female player to be inducted. Winner of eight doubles majors titles. Also represented Australia at the Federation Cup between 1965 and 1970.	
2014		Kerry Reid	The ninth female player to be inducted. Winner of one singles and two doubles majors titles. Also represented Australia at the Federation Cup between 1967 and 1979, winning in 1968.	
2015	David Hall in 2000	David Hall *	First wheelchair player to be inducted. Winner of six Paralympic medals, nine-time winner of the Australian Open, eight-time winner of the US Open, seven-time winner of the British Open and eight-time winner of the Japan Open.	
2016	Rex Hartwig	Rex Hartwig	Winner of four doubles majors titles. Also represented Australia at the Davis Cup between 1953 and 1955.	
2017	–	Beryl Penrose	The tenth female player to be inducted. Winner of one singles and three doubles majors titles, all at the Australian Championships.	
2018	–	Jan Lehane	Australian Open girls' singles champion 1958-59; women's singles finalist 1960-63; winner of the 1960-61 mixed doubles titles.	
2019	Dianne Fromholtz	Dianne Fromholtz	Former world number 4 (1979), winner of 8 WTA Tour singles titles, finalist at 1977 Australian Open. Winner of 1977 Australian Open women's doubles title.	
2020	–	John Fitzgerald	Winner of 30 doubles titles, including seven Grand Slam men's doubles titles; ranked number 1 in doubles July 1991. Winner of two Grand Slam mixed doubles titles. Represented Australia in Davis Cup and was a member of the 1983 and 1986 championship teams. After retirement, captained Australia's Davis Cup team 2001-10, leading the team to the 2003 title.	
2021	–	Mary Carter Reitano	Winner of the 1956, 1959 (singles), 1961 (women's doubles) Australian Championships titles.	
2022		Margaret Molesworth	Winner of the inaugural women's singles title at the 1922 Australasian Championships and won again in 1923. winner of Women's doubles in 1930, 1933, 1934.	
2022	Joan Hartigan in 1935	Joan Hartigan	Winner of the 1933, 1934 and 1936 (singles), Australian Championships titles.	
2023	Anderson in 1922	James Anderson (tennis)	Winner of the 1922, 1924 and 1925 (singles) and 1924 (doubles) Australian Championships titles. Also won 1922 (doubles) Wimbledon and 1919 Davis Cup.	
2024	Hewitt in 2005	Lleyton Hewitt	Winner of the 2001 (singles) US Open and 2002 Wimbledon titles. Also won 1999 and 2002 Davis Cup.	
2025		Esna Boyd	Winner of 1927 (singles); 1922, 1923, 1926 and 1928 (doubles); and 1922, 1926 and 1927 (mixed doubles) Australian Championships.	

== See also ==
- International Tennis Hall of Fame
