= Robert Brien =

Australian tennis player

- Full name: Robert C. Brien
- Country (sports): Australia
- Born: 26 October 1944 (age 81) Sydney, Australia
- College: Mississippi State University (1964–1967)

Singles

Grand Slam singles results
- Australian Open: 2R (1964, 1966)
- US Open: 1R (1964, 1971)

Doubles

Grand Slam doubles results
- Australian Open: 2R (1962, 1963)

Robert C. Brien (born 26 October 1944 in Sydney) was a tennis player in the 1960s and 1970s.

== Tennis career ==
In 1963 Brien, with John Cottrill, won the Australian Championships Boys Doubles Championship.

As a 19-year-old who had been in the United States for four months, Brien reached the final at the Cincinnati Open in 1964 before losing to Herb Fitzgibbon.

According to an article in the 5 July 1964, edition of The Cincinnati Enquirer, Brien had defeated Neale Fraser, Owen Davidson, Tony Roche and Bill Lenoir.

Brien played collegiate tennis at Mississippi State University. He was an All-American in 1966 and 1967. Brien finished his collegiate tennis career with a 67–1 career winning record.

In 1981 Brien was inducted into the Mississippi State University Sports Hall of Fame.

Brien was inducted into the Mississippi Sports Hall of Fame in 1985.
