= Frederick Sherriff (tennis) =

Australian tennis player (born 1943)

Fred Sherriff
- Country (sports): Australia
- Born: 10 July 1943 (age 82) Ulmarra, New South Wales, Australia
- Turned pro: 1960
- Retired: 1969

Singles
- Career record: 36-11

Grand Slam singles results
- Australian Open: 2R (1962, 1964)
- US Open: 1R (1964)

Frederick Sherriff (born 10 July 1943) is a former Australian tennis player who reached the first and second round in the 1962 Australian Championships in men's singles. He was defeated by Rod Laver. He played in the 1964 U.S. National Championships with William Higgins in the 64th round.
