= 1966 Australian Championships =

- Date: 21–31 January 1966
- Edition: 54th
- Category: Grand Slam (ITF)
- Surface: Grass
- Location: Sydney, Australia
- Venue: White City Tennis Club

Champions

Men's singles
- (Australia) Roy Emerson

Women's singles
- (Australia) Margaret Smith

Men's doubles
- (Australia) Fred Stolle / (Australia) Roy Emerson

Women's doubles
- (United States) Carole Caldwell Graebner / (United States) Nancy Richey

Mixed doubles
- (Australia) Judy Tegart / (Australia) Tony Roche
- Australian Championships

The 1966 Australian Championships was a tennis tournament that took place on outdoor Grass courts at the White City Tennis Club, Sydney, Australia from 21 to 31 January. It was the 54th edition of the Australian Championships (now known as the Australian Open), the 15th held in Sydney, and the first Grand Slam tournament of the year. The singles titles were won by Australians Roy Emerson and Margaret Smith.

== Champions ==
=== Men's singles ===
(Australia) Roy Emerson defeated (United States) Arthur Ashe 6–4, 6–8, 6–2, 6–3

=== Women's singles ===
(Australia) Margaret Smith defeated (United States) Nancy Richey walkover

=== Men's doubles ===
(Australia) Roy Emerson / (Australia) Fred Stolle defeated (Australia) John Newcombe / (Australia) Tony Roche, 7–9, 6–3, 6–8, 14–12, 12–10

=== Women's doubles ===
(United States) Carole Graebner / (United States) Nancy Richey defeated (Australia) Margaret Smith / (Australia) Lesley Turner, 6–4, 7–5

=== Mixed doubles ===
(Australia) Judy Tegart / (Australia) Tony Roche defeated (Australia) Robyn Ebbern / (Australia) Bill Bowrey, 6–1, 6–3

Preceded by 1965 U.S. National Championships	Grand Slams	Succeeded by 1966 French Championships
