= Roger Dowdeswell =

Rhodesian tennis player (born 1944)

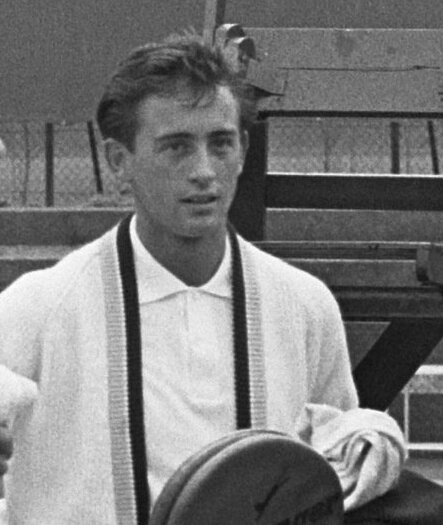
- Roger Dowdeswell (1965)
- Country (sports): Rhodesia
- Born: 16 February 1944 (age 81); Nairobi, Kenya Colony
- Plays: Right-handed

Singles
- Career record: 12-34
- Career titles: 0
- Highest ranking: No. 64 (20 Dec 1974)

Grand Slam singles results
- Australian Open: 2R (1966)
- French Open: 2R (1965)
- Wimbledon: 2R (1965)
- US Open: 2R (1974)

Roger Dowdeswell (born 16 February 1944) is a former professional tennis player from Zimbabwe. He is the elder brother of Colin Dowdeswell.

== Playing career ==
Dowdeswell made the second round of all four Grand Slam tournaments during his career. He played Davis Cup tennis for Rhodesia in 1965, against Yugoslavia. In his singles rubbers he lost to Boro Jovanović and Niki Pilic, the same two that would beat he and Roy Stilwell in the doubles.

== Coaching ==
Dowdeswell, who is now the Tennis Director of the Manhattan Plaza Racquet Club, has coached the American and New Zealand junior Davis Cup teams.
