= Ian Barclay =

Australian tennis coach

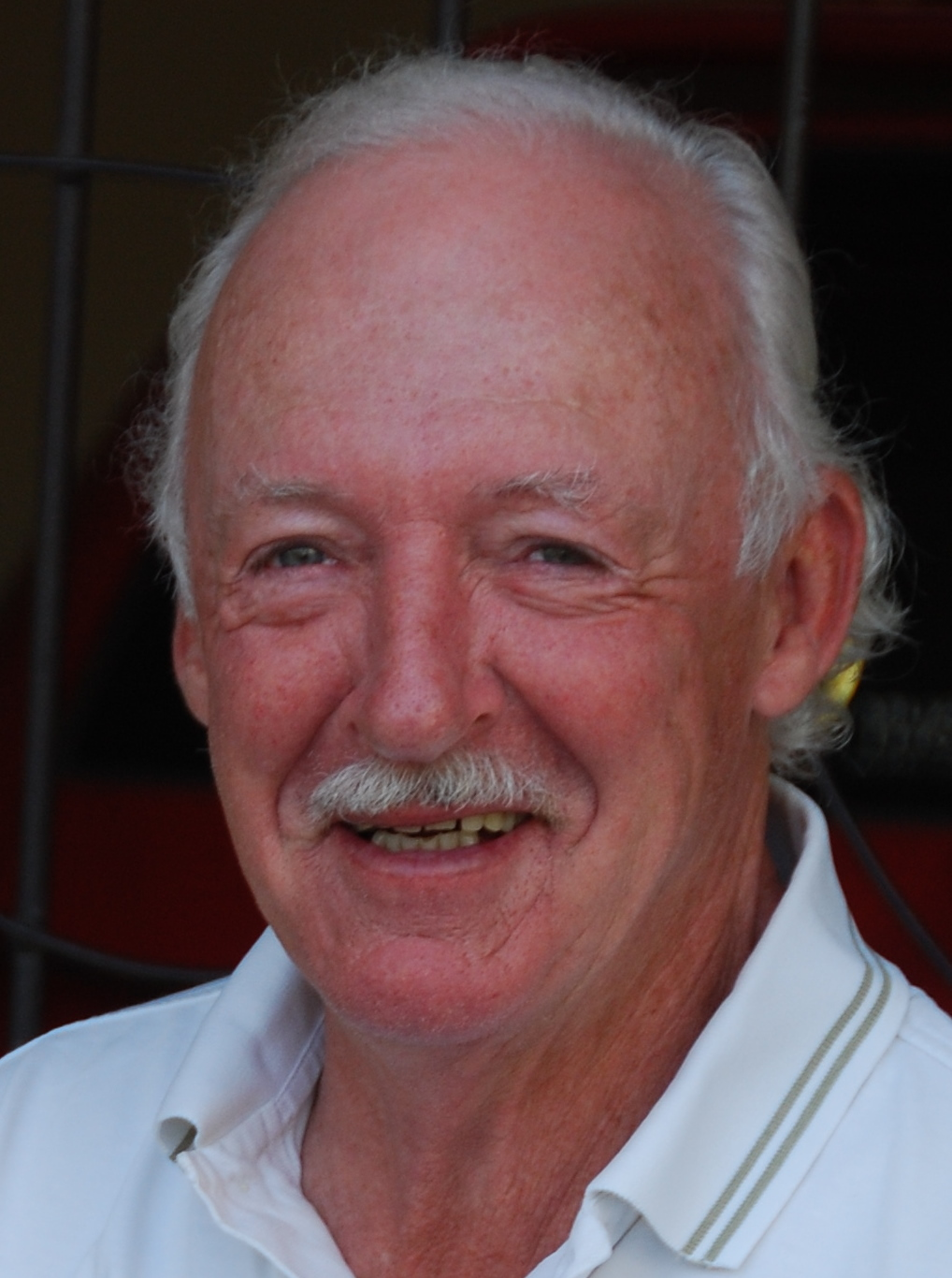
- Ian Barclay
- Born: Ian Barclay; 2 December 1938 (age 87); Melbourne, Victoria, Australia
- Occupation: Tennis Coach
- Years active: 1960–present

Ian Barclay (born 2 December 1938) is a Melbourne-based tennis coach.

Barclay was born in Melbourne, Australia. He coached a number of Victorian and Australian Junior Champions, singles and doubles, most notably Pat Cash.

He went on to be the National Junior Coach for the Lawn Tennis Association, where he remained for nine years before returning to Australia. As of 2010 he was still coaching and involved with junior development programs with Tennis Australia.

== Coaching Highlights ==
| Year | Player | Tournament | S/D | Surface | Opponent in Final | Score in Final |
|---|---|---|---|---|---|---|
| 1987 | (Australia) Pat Cash | The Championships, Wimbledon | S | Grass | (Czech Republic) Ivan Lendl | 7–6, 6–2, 7–5 |
