= Graham Primrose =

Australian tennis player

- Country (sports): Australia
- Born: 22 February 1939 (age 86)
- Plays: Left-handed

Singles

Grand Slam singles results
- Australian Open: 1R (1966)
- Wimbledon: 1R (1966, 1967)

Graham Primrose (born 22 February 1939) is an Australian former tennis player.

Primrose, raised in Sydney, was born with a foot disability which left him unable to walk for eight years.

A left-handed player, Primrose was active on the international tour in the 1960s. Much of his tennis was played in Britain and he married local tennis player Robin Lloyd. He won the Scottish Championships in 1967, Essex Championships in 1969 and twice featured in the singles main draw at Wimbledon.

Primrose played collegiate tennis for Mississippi State University, winning the SEC title at No. 1 singles in 1964. He was head coach for a season in 1969 and then in 1971 became coach of Jacksonville State University in Alabama.
