= 1966 Australian Championships – Women's singles =

Women's singles
- 1966 Australian Championships

Final
- Champion: (Australia) Margaret Smith
- Runner-up: (United States) Nancy Richey
- Score: w/o

Details
- Draw: 48
- Seeds: 12

Events
Singles	men	women
Doubles	men	women
- Australian Championships

Top-seeded Margaret Smith won the women's singles tennis title at the 1966 Australian Championships after Nancy Richey withdrew from the final. This is the only walkover in a Ladies Singles Final of a Grand Slam tournament and was Smith's 7th straight Australian Open title.

== Seeds ==
The seeded players are listed below. Margaret Smith is the champion; others show the round in which they were eliminated.

1. (Australia) Margaret Smith (champion)
2. (United States) Nancy Richey (finalist)
3. (Australia) Lesley Turner (third round)
4. (United States) Carole Caldwell Graebner (semifinals)
5. (Australia) Judy Tegart (quarterfinals)
6. (Australia) Gail Sherriff (third round)
7. (Australia) Jan Lehane (second round)
8. (Australia) Madonna Schacht (quarterfinals)
9. (Australia) Robyn Ebbern (third round)
10. (Australia) Joan Gibson (quarterfinals)
11. (Australia) Karen Krantzcke (third round)
12. (Australia) Kerry Melville (semifinals)

== Draw ==
=== Key ===
- Q = Qualifier
- WC = Wild card
- LL = Lucky loser
- r = Retired

=== Finals ===
Quarterfinals
1	(Australia) Margaret Smith	6	6
8	(Australia) Madonna Schacht	1	3
5	(Australia) Judy Tegart	3	3
4	(United States) Carole Caldwell Graebner	6	6
10	(Australia) Joan Gibson	2	6	4
12	(Australia) Kerry Melville	6	3	6
(Australia) Helen Amos	2	3
2	(United States) Nancy Richey	6	6

Semifinals
1	(Australia) Margaret Smith	6	6
4	(United States) Carole Caldwell Graebner	2	4
12	(Australia) Kerry Melville	2	6
2	(United States) Nancy Richey	6	8

Finals
1	(Australia) Margaret Smith	W
2	(United States) Nancy Richey	L w/o

=== Earlier rounds ===
==== Section 1 ====
First round

Second round
1	(Australia) Smith	6	6
(Australia) Kenny	3	1
(Australia) Marsh	3	1
(Australia) Jenkins	6	6
(Australia) Hunt	6	3	0
(Australia) Gourlay	1	6	6
(Australia) Malfroy	0	1
8	(Australia) Schacht	6	6

Third round
1	(Australia) Smith	6	11
(Australia) Jenkins	1	9
(Australia) Gourlay	2	3
8	(Australia) Schacht	6	6

Quarterfinals
1	(Australia) Smith	6	6
8	(Australia) Schacht	1	3

==== Section 2 ====
First round
5	(Australia) Tegart	6	6
(Australia) Olsson	0	2
(Australia) Sherriff	6	6
(Australia) Begbie	2	4
(Australia) Fenton	6	6
(Argentina) Giscafré	1	3
11	(Australia) Krantzcke	6	6
(Australia) Mackay	2	2
9	(Australia) Ebbern	6	6
(Australia) Alexander	2	2
(Australia) Walsham	6	6
(Australia) Brennan	2	4
(Australia) Dening	6	6
(Australia) Cooper	2	0
4	(United States) Caldwell Graebner	6	6
(Australia) Jones	2	1

Second round
5	(Australia) Tegart	6	6
(Australia) Sherriff	2	2
(Australia) Fenton	4	1
11	(Australia) Krantzcke	6	6
9	(Australia) Ebbern	4	6	6
(Australia) Walsham	6	2	2
(Australia) Dening	3	1
4	(United States) Caldwell Graebner	6	6

Third round
5	(Australia) Tegart	6	8
11	(Australia) Krantzcke	4	6
9	(Australia) Ebbern	1	4
4	(United States) Caldwell Graebner	6	6

Quarterfinals
5	(Australia) Tegart	3	3
4	(United States) Caldwell Graebner	6	6

==== Section 3 ====
First round
3	(Australia) Turner	6	6
(Australia) Kynaston	2	3
(Australia) Don	6	3	6
(Australia) Davies	3	6	2
(Australia) Eastburn	7	5	7
(Australia) Van Haren	5	7	5
10	(Australia) Gibson	6	4	6
(Australia) Martin	1	6	1
12	(Australia) Melville	6	6
Q	(Australia) Wicks	4	0
Q	(Australia) Smith	4	6	6
(Australia) Langsford	6	3	2
(West Germany) Pfannenberg	6	4	6
(France) Boulle	4	6	4
6	(Australia) Sherriff	6	6
Q	(Australia) Born	3	3

Second round
3	(Australia) Turner	6	6
(Australia) Don	1	3
(Australia) Eastburn	2	3
10	(Australia) Gibson	6	6
12	(Australia) Melville	6	6
Q	(Australia) Smith	0	2
(West Germany) Pfannenberg	1	1
6	(Australia) Sherriff	6	6

Third round
3	(Australia) Turner	6	1
10	(Australia) Gibson	8	6
12	(Australia) Melville	13	4	6
6	(Australia) Sherriff	11	6	0

Quarterfinals
10	(Australia) Gibson	2	6	4
12	(Australia) Melville	6	3	6

==== Section 4 ====
First round

Second round
7	(Australia) Lehane	w/o
Q	(Australia) Hole
(Australia) Amos	6	6	6
(France) Salfati	8	0	4
(Australia) Turner	12	4	6
(Australia) Starr	10	6	4
(Australia) Dunn	3	3
2	(United States) Richey	6	6

Third round
Q	(Australia) Hole	2	4
(Australia) Amos	6	6
(Australia) Turner	1	0
2	(United States) Richey	6	6

Quarterfinals
(Australia) Amos	2	3
2	(United States) Richey	6	6

Preceded by 1965 U.S. National Championships – Women's singles	Grand Slam women's singles	Succeeded by 1966 French Championships – Women's singles
