= John Cottrill =

Australian tennis player

- Full name: John Arthur Cottrill
- Country (sports): Australia
- Born: 18 November 1945 (age 80)

Grand Slam singles results
- Australian Open: 3R (1963, 1966, 1967)
- French Open: 1R (1966)
- Wimbledon: 2R (1967)

Grand Slam doubles results
- Australian Open: QF (1967)

Grand Slam mixed doubles results
- Australian Open: SF (1966)
- Wimbledon: QF (1967)

John Arthur Cottrill (born 18 November 1945) is an Australian former professional tennis player.

Cottrill, a New South Wales junior hard court champion from Sydney, was a member of Australia's Davis Cup squad for a 1965 tie against Spain. He took Roy Emerson to five sets in the semi-finals of the 1966 Australian Hard Court Championships. In 1967, his final year on tour, he was married to tennis player Joan Gibson and partnered with her to make the mixed doubles quarter-finals at Wimbledon. They had a son born in 1969.
