= 1966 Australian Championships – Men's singles =

Men's singles
- 1966 Australian Championships

Final
- Champion: (Australia) Roy Emerson
- Runner-up: (United States) Arthur Ashe
- Score: 6–4, 6–8, 6–2, 6–3

Details
- Draw: 64
- Seeds: 16

Events
Singles	men	women
Doubles	men	women
- Australian Championships

First-seeded Roy Emerson defeated Arthur Ashe 6–4, 6–8, 6–2, 6–3 in the final to win the men's singles tennis title at the 1966 Australian Championships.

== Seeds ==
The seeded players are listed below. Roy Emerson is the champion; others show the round in which they were eliminated.

1. (Australia) Roy Emerson (champion)
2. (United States) Arthur Ashe (finalist)
3. (Australia) Fred Stolle (semifinals)
4. (United States) Clark Graebner (quarterfinals)
5. (Australia) John Newcombe (semifinals)
6. n/a
7. (Australia) Tony Roche (quarterfinals)
8. (United States) Marty Riessen (third round)
9. (Australia) Bill Bowrey (quarterfinals)
10. (Netherlands) Tom Okker (third round)
11. (Australia) Owen Davidson (third round)
12. (Australia) Ken Fletcher (first round)
13. (Australia) John Cottrill (third round)
14. (United States) Herb Fitzgibbon (third round)
15. (Australia) Ray Ruffels (third round)
16. (United Kingdom) Roger Taylor (third round)

== Draw ==
=== Key ===
- Q = Qualifier
- WC = Wild card
- LL = Lucky loser
- r = Retired

=== Final eight ===
Quarterfinals
1	(Australia) Roy Emerson	9	4	4	7	9
9	(Australia) Bill Bowrey	7	6	6	5	7
5	(Australia) John Newcombe	2	6	6	7
4	(United States) Clark Graebner	6	1	3	5
3	(Australia) Fred Stolle	6	7	7
(New Zealand) Lew Gerrard	2	5	5
7	(Australia) Tony Roche	12	4	3
2	(United States) Arthur Ashe	14	6	6

Semifinals
1	(Australia) Roy Emerson	4	6	6	6
5	(Australia) John Newcombe	6	2	1	2
3	(Australia) Fred Stolle	4	6	3	8
2	(United States) Arthur Ashe	6	1	6	10

Final
1	(Australia) Roy Emerson	6	6	6	6
2	(United States) Arthur Ashe	4	8	2	3

=== Earlier rounds ===
==== Section 1 ====
First round
1	(Australia) Emerson	5	6	6	6
(Australia) Brown	7	4	4	1
(Australia) Sherriff
(United Kingdom) Bovett	w/o
(Australia) Stone	6	6	6
(Argentina) Harms	2	1	2
14	(United States) Fitzgibbon	6	6	6
(Australia) Holland	0	3	3
9	(Australia) Bowrey
(Australia) Richards	w/o
(Australia) Cooper	6	4	6	8	6
(Sweden) Bergelin	3	6	3	10	3
(Argentina) Ganzábal	3	4	6	6	6
Q	(Australia) Robin White	6	6	1	3	4
8	(United States) Riessen	6	6	6
(Australia) Wilson	1	3	2

Second round
1	(Australia) Emerson	7	6	6
(Australia) Sherriff	5	3	1
(Australia) Stone	8	1	4
14	(United States) Fitzgibbon	10	6	6
9	(Australia) Bowrey	7	6	6	6
(Australia) Cooper	5	2	8	2
(Argentina) Ganzábal	4	4	0
8	(United States) Riessen	6	6	6

Third round
1	(Australia) Emerson	12	6	6
14	(United States) Fitzgibbon	10	4	4
9	(Australia) Bowrey	6	4	10	6
8	(United States) Riessen	4	6	8	2

Quarterfinals
1	(Australia) Emerson	9	4	4	7	9
9	(Australia) Bowrey	7	6	6	5	7

==== Section 2 ====
First round
5	(Australia) Newcombe	6	6	6
(Sweden) Zahr	3	1	0
(Jamaica) Russell	6	6	6
Q	(Australia) Chopra	0	0	0
(Chile) Rodríguez	4	4	7	6	6
(Australia) Layton	6	6	5	3	4
16	(United Kingdom) Taylor	6	7	8
(Australia) Primrose	0	5	6
11	(Australia) Davidson	6	6	7
(Australia) Colette	0	1	5
(Rhodesia) Dowdeswell	2	7	7	6
Q	(Australia) Musgrave	6	5	5	3
(Australia) Lane
Q	(Australia) Williams	w/o
4	(United States) Graebner	6	6	7
Q	(Indonesia) Sugiarto	2	4	5

Second round
5	(Australia) Newcombe	6	6	6
(Jamaica) Russell	2	3	4
(Chile) Rodríguez	3	10	4
16	(United Kingdom) Taylor	6	12	6
11	(Australia) Davidson	6	6	6
(Rhodesia) Dowdeswell	3	2	3
(Australia) Lane	9	5	4	6	3
4	(United States) Graebner	7	7	6	1	6

Third round
5	(Australia) Newcombe	6	6	9
16	(United Kingdom) Taylor	2	4	7
11	(Australia) Davidson	6	3	2	3
4	(United States) Graebner	4	6	6	6

Quarterfinals
5	(Australia) Newcombe	2	6	6	7
4	(United States) Graebner	6	1	3	5

==== Section 3 ====
First round
3	(Australia) Stolle	6	6	6
Q	(Australia) Gulley	1	1	1
(Australia) Brien	6	1	8	12
(Australia) Russo	3	6	6	10
(Australia) Jacques	7	9	15
(Australia) Bowman	5	7	13
(Australia) O'Brien
12	(Australia) Fletcher	w/o
13	(Australia) Cottrill	6	3	6	6
(New Zealand) Fairlie	3	6	3	4
(Australia) Lloyd	6	6	6
(Australia) Pollard	4	3	2
(United Kingdom) Phillips	6	1	5	10	6
(Australia) Bailey	0	6	7	8	1
(New Zealand) Gerrard	6	6	6
(Australia) Walker	4	3	2

Second round
3	(Australia) Stolle	10	6	7
(Australia) Brien	8	3	5
(Australia) Jacques
(Australia) O'Brien	w/o
13	(Australia) Cottrill	3	6	8	8	6
(Australia) Lloyd	6	2	6	10	2
(United Kingdom) Phillips	3	5	2
(New Zealand) Gerrard	6	7	6

Third round
3	(Australia) Stolle	6	6	10
(Australia) Jacques	2	1	8
13	(Australia) Cottrill	3	6	1	7	4
(New Zealand) Gerrard	6	4	6	5	6

Quarterfinals
3	(Australia) Stolle	6	7	7
(New Zealand) Gerrard	2	5	5

==== Section 4 ====
First round
7	(Australia) Roche	6	6	6
(Australia) Bashford	3	0	2
(Spain) Gisbert	3	6	6	6
(Australia) Coghlan	6	4	3	4
(United States) McManus	5	3	6	6	6
(Australia) Brent	7	6	3	2	4
10	(Netherlands) Okker	6	6	6
(Australia) McCumstie	2	3	4
15	(Australia) Ruffels
(Australia) Stanbury	w/o
(Australia) Phillips-Moore	6	6	6
Q	(Australia) Hogben	3	3	1
(Australia) Stubs	6	6	6
(Belgium) De Ville	0	3	3
2	(United States) Ashe	6	6	6
(Australia) Crealy	3	3	4

Second round
7	(Australia) Roche	11	7	7
(Spain) Gisbert	9	5	5
(United States) McManus	2	8	4	4
10	(Netherlands) Okker	6	6	6	6
15	(Australia) Ruffels	6	8	6
(Australia) Phillips-Moore	3	6	3
(Australia) Stubs	4	9	4	4
2	(United States) Ashe	6	7	6	6

Third round
7	(Australia) Roche	20	6	3	8
10	(Netherlands) Okker	18	2	6	6
15	(Australia) Ruffels	6	5	4
2	(United States) Ashe	8	7	6

Quarterfinals
7	(Australia) Roche	12	4	3
2	(United States) Ashe	14	6	6

Preceded by 1965 U.S. National Championships	Grand Slam men's singles	Succeeded by 1966 French Championships
