= George Russell MacCall =

American tennis layer

George Russell MacCall (May 7, 1918 – December 24, 2008) was an American tennis player, tennis promoter and a former US Davis Cup captain. He is the founder of the MacCall Youth Tennis Foundation and a three-time Wimbledon finalist.

== Early life and education ==
MacCall was born and raised in Kearny, New Jersey. He started playing tennis at the age of 10.

In 1935, he attended Scarborough Prep School in New York. He transferred to Bucknell University in 1937, after graduating from the University of Virginia, in 1936. MacCall took additional courses at Upsala College, UCLA, and UNLV.

== Career ==
George MacCall was the captain of the U.S. Davis Cup from 1965 to 1967. Later, he promoted tennis by organizing celebrity tennis events featuring Bill Cosby and Charlton Heston and organized tennis matches between Pancho Gonzales and Rod Laver in New York and Los Angeles. He also organized the National Tennis League with reputed tennis players Laver, Gonzalez, Ken Rosewall, Roy Emerson, Fred Stolle, Rosie Casals, and Billie Jean King to name a few. He sold the league to Lamar Hunt in 1970.

MacCall served as a tennis consultant and later as a sports director at the Sands. In 1992, he was hired by UNLV to construct the Frack and Vicki Fertitta Tennis Complex. He was also the co-chair of the search committee designated to find UNLV's first tennis coach.

MacCall served as the first commissioner of World TeamTennis, featuring the likes of Arthur Ashe, Marty Riessen, and Dennis Ralston.

== Recognition ==
George MacCall won the 1959 USTA National Public Parks Open Men's Doubles Championship, the 1960-62 USTA Hard Court Men's 35 and Over Doubles Championship and the 1964 USTA Men's Hard Court 45 and Over Doubles Championship. He was a three-time Wimbledon finalist in the 45 and Over Doubles competition.

He was the 2006 inductee- Southern Nevada Sports Hall of Fame.

== Philanthropy ==
MacCall founded the MacCall Youth Tennis Foundation in 1988. The foundation provides tennis opportunities for children of all income level, arranging professional instructors and equipment for them.6 MacCall has provided free tennis lessons to above 20,000 children in Las Vegas, through the foundation.

== Personal life ==
MacCall was married to Mary Withington and has two daughters, Robin and Polly. His wife died in 2006.
