= Bob Hewitt =

South African convicted rapist and professional tennis player

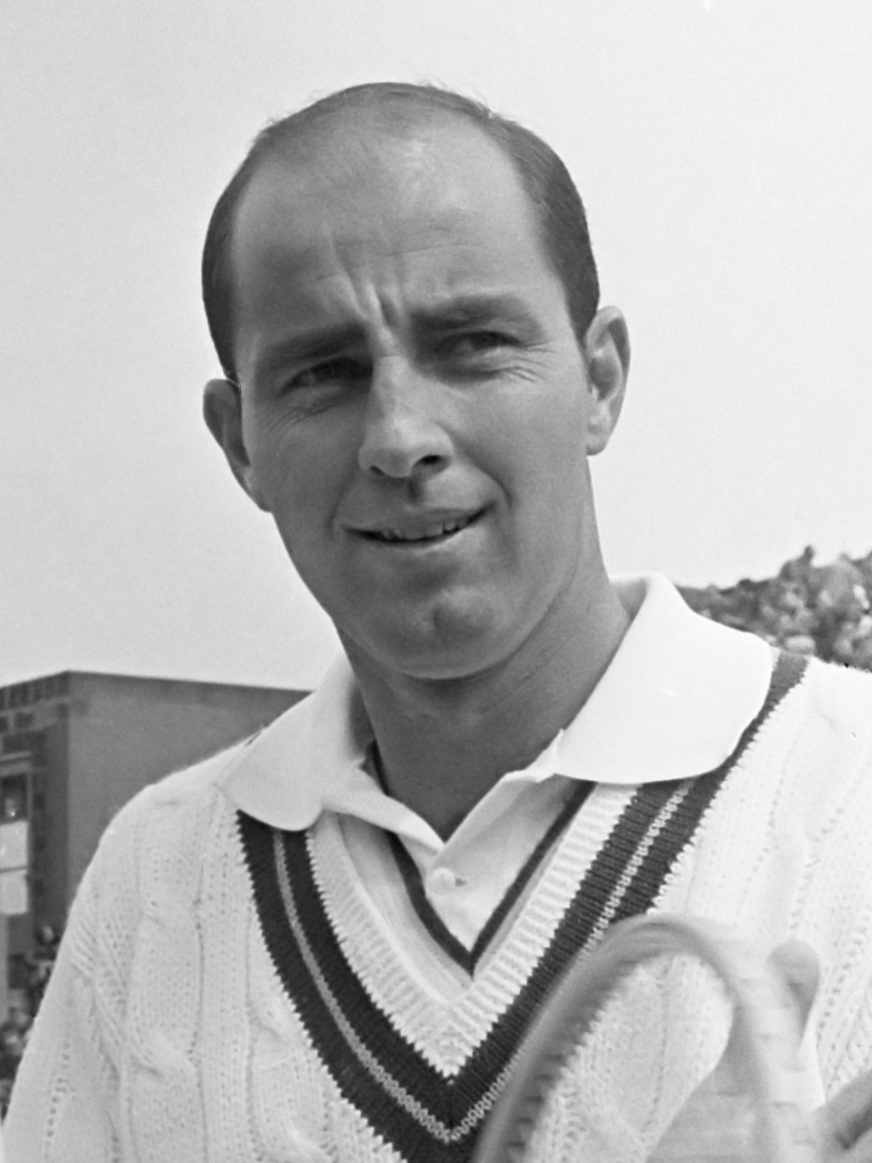
- Bob Hewitt (1967)
- Full name: Robert Anthony John Hewitt
- Country (sports): Australia; South Africa
- Residence: Eastern Cape, South Africa
- Born: 12 January 1940 (age 86) Dubbo, New South Wales, Australia
- Height: 6 ft 3 in (1.91 m)
- Turned pro: 1970 (amateur from 1958)
- Retired: 1983
- Plays: Right-handed (one-handed backhand)
- Prize money: $613,837 (Open era)
- Int. Tennis HoF: 1992; Suspended in 2012; Expelled in 2016

Singles
- Career record: 243–170 (Open era)
- Career titles: 7
- Highest ranking: No. 6 (1967, Lance Tingay)

Grand Slam singles results
- Australian Open: SF (1960, 1962, 1963)
- French Open: 4R (1961, 1963, 1964, 1965, 1967)
- Wimbledon: QF (1962, 1964, 1966)
- US Open: QF (1967)

Other tournaments
- Tour Finals: RR (1972)

Doubles
- Career record: 481–124
- Career titles: 65
- Highest ranking: No. 1 (1 March 1976)

Grand Slam doubles results
- Australian Open: W (1963, 1964)
- French Open: W (1972)
- Wimbledon: W (1962, 1964, 1967, 1972, 1978)
- US Open: W (1977)

Other doubles tournaments
- Tour Finals: W (1977)

Mixed doubles
- Career titles: 6

Grand Slam mixed doubles results
- Australian Open: W (1961)
- French Open: W (1970, 1979)
- Wimbledon: W (1977, 1979)
- US Open: W (1979)

Team competitions
- Davis Cup: W (1974)

Robert Anthony John Hewitt (born 12 January 1940) is a former professional tennis player from Australia. In 1967, after marrying a South African, he became a South African citizen. He has won 15 major titles and a career Grand Slam in both men's and mixed doubles.

In 2015, he was convicted of rape and sexual assault of girls he was coaching in the 1980s and 1990s; Hewitt was sentenced to six years in jail, and was subsequently expelled from the International Tennis Hall of Fame.

== Early life ==
Hewitt was born and grew up in Dubbo, Australia, 400 kilometres west of Sydney. In the 1970s, he and his South African wife Dalaille (née Nicholas) moved to Johannesburg, South Africa. He is now a South African citizen.

== Career ==
Hewitt's most significant accomplishment was winning all Grand Slam doubles titles, both in men's and mixed doubles (US Open, Wimbledon, Australian Open and French Open), and being central to South Africa's only Davis Cup title in 1974. This victory was controversial, as India boycotted the final on the orders of their government due to South Africa's apartheid policies and their effect on the ethnic Indian community of the country.

Hewitt achieved seven titles in singles and 65 in doubles. He was ranked world No. 6 in 1967 by Lance Tingay of The Daily Telegraph. In 1992, he was inducted into the International Tennis Hall of Fame, but he was suspended from the Hall in 2012 and expelled in 2016 after his convictions of rape and sexual assault.

== Grand Slam finals ==
=== Doubles (9 titles, 4 runner-ups) ===
Result	Year	Championship	Surface	Partner	Opponents	Score
Loss	1961	Wimbledon	Grass	(Australia) Fred Stolle	(Australia) Roy Emerson (Australia) Neale Fraser	4–6, 8–6, 4–6, 8–6, 6–8
Loss	1962	Australian Championships	Grass	(Australia) Fred Stolle	(Australia) Roy Emerson (Australia) Neale Fraser	6–4, 6–4, 1–6, 4–6, 9–11
Win	1962	Wimbledon	Grass	(Australia) Fred Stolle	(Socialist Federal Republic of Yugoslavia) Boro Jovanović (Socialist Federal Republic of Yugoslavia) Nikola Pilić	6–2, 5–7, 6–2, 6–4
Win	1963	Australian Championships	Grass	(Australia) Fred Stolle	(Australia) Ken Fletcher (Australia) John Newcombe	6–2, 3–6, 6–3, 3–6, 6–3
Win	1964	Australian Championships	Grass	(Australia) Fred Stolle	(Australia) Roy Emerson (Australia) Ken Fletcher	6–4, 7–5, 3–6, 4–6, 14–12
Win	1964	Wimbledon (2)	Grass	(Australia) Fred Stolle	(Australia) Roy Emerson (Australia) Ken Fletcher	7–5, 11–9, 6–4
Loss	1965	French Championships	Clay	(Australia) Ken Fletcher	(Australia) Roy Emerson (Australia) Fred Stolle	8–6, 3–6, 6–8, 2–6
Loss	1965	Wimbledon	Grass	(Australia) Ken Fletcher	(Australia) John Newcombe (Australia) Tony Roche	5–7, 3–6, 4–6
Win	1967	Wimbledon (3)	Grass	(South Africa) Frew McMillan	(Australia) Roy Emerson (Australia) Ken Fletcher	6–2, 6–3, 6–4
Win	1972	French Open	Clay	(South Africa) Frew McMillan	(Chile) Patricio Cornejo (Chile) Jaime Fillol	6–3, 8–6, 3–6, 6–1
Win	1972	Wimbledon (4)	Grass	(South Africa) Frew McMillan	(United States) Stan Smith (United States) Erik van Dillen	6–2, 6–2, 9–7
Win	1977	US Open	Hard	(South Africa) Frew McMillan	(United States) Brian Gottfried (Mexico) Raúl Ramírez	6–4, 6–0
Winner	1978	Wimbledon (5)	Grass	(South Africa) Frew McMillan	(United States) Peter Fleming (United States) John McEnroe	6–1, 6–4, 6–2

=== Mixed doubles (6 titles, 1 runner-up) ===
Result	Year	Championship	Surface	Partner	Opponents	Score
Win	1961	Australian Championships	Grass	(Australia) Jan Lehane O'Neill	(Australia) Mary Carter Reitano (Australia) John Pearce	9–7, 6–2
Loss	1963	Wimbledon	Grass	(United States) Darlene Hard	(Australia) Margaret Court (Australia) Ken Fletcher	9–11, 4–6
Win	1970	French Open	Clay	(United States) Billie Jean King	(France) Françoise Dürr (France) Jean-Claude Barclay	3–6, 6–4, 6–2
Win	1977	Wimbledon	Grass	(South Africa) Greer Stevens	(Netherlands) Betty Stöve (South Africa) Frew McMillan	3–6, 7–5, 6–4
Win	1979	French Open (2)	Clay	(Australia) Wendy Turnbull	(Romania) Virginia Ruzici (Romania) Ion Țiriac	6–3, 2–6, 6–3
Win	1979	Wimbledon (2)	Grass	(South Africa) Greer Stevens	(Netherlands) Betty Stöve (South Africa) Frew McMillan	7–5, 7–6^{(9–7)}
Win	1979	US Open	Hard	(South Africa) Greer Stevens	(Netherlands) Betty Stöve (South Africa) Frew McMillan	6–3, 7–5

== Open Era finals ==
=== Doubles: 80 (55 titles / 25 runner-ups) ===
Result	W-L	Year	Tournament	Surface	Partner	Opponents	Score
Win	1.	1970	Washington, D.C., US	Hard	(South Africa) Frew McMillan	(Romania) Ilie Năstase (Romania) Ion Țiriac	7–5, 6–0
Loss	1.	1970	Cincinnati, US	Clay	(South Africa) Frew McMillan	(Romania) Ilie Năstase (Romania) Ion Țiriac	3–6, 4–6
Win	2.	1970	Hamburg, Germany	Clay	(South Africa) Frew McMillan	(Netherlands) Tom Okker (Socialist Federal Republic of Yugoslavia) Nikola Pilić	6–3, 7–5, 6–2
Win	3.	1972	Bournemouth, UK	Clay	(South Africa) Frew McMillan	(Romania) Ilie Năstase (Romania) Ion Țiriac	7–5, 6–2
Win	4.	1972	French Open, Paris	Clay	(South Africa) Frew McMillan	(Chile) Patricio Cornejo (Chile) Jaime Fillol	6–3, 8–6, 3–6, 6–1
Loss	2.	1972	Hamburg, Germany	Clay	(Romania) Ion Țiriac	(Czechoslovakia) Jan Kodeš (Romania) Ilie Năstase	6–4, 0–6, 6–3, 2–6, 2–6
Win	5.	1972	Bristol, UK	Grass	(South Africa) Frew McMillan	(United States) Clark Graebner (Australia) Lew Hoad	6–3, 6–2
Win	6.	1972	Wimbledon, London	Grass	(South Africa) Frew McMillan	(United States) Stan Smith (United States) Erik van Dillen	6–2, 6–2, 9–7
Win	7.	1972	Tanglewood, US	Clay	(Rhodesia) Andrew Pattison	(United States) Jim McManus (United States) Jim Osborne	6–4, 6–4
Win	8.	1972	Cincinnati, US	Clay	(South Africa) Frew McMillan	(United States) Paul Gerken (Venezuela) Humphrey Hose	7–6, 6–4
Win	9.	1972	Indianapolis, US	Clay	(South Africa) Frew McMillan	(Chile) Patricio Cornejo (Chile) Jaime Fillol	6–2, 6–3
Win	10.	1972	Albany, US	Carpet	(South Africa) Frew McMillan	(Sweden) Ove Nils Bengtson (Sweden) Björn Borg	6–4, 6–2
Loss	3.	1974	Little Rock, US	Carpet	(United States) Vitas Gerulaitis	(West Germany) Jürgen Fassbender (West Germany) Karl Meiler	0–6, 2–6
Win	11.	1974	Washington WCT, US	Carpet	(South Africa) Frew McMillan	(Netherlands) Tom Okker (United States) Marty Riessen	7–6, 6–3
Win	12.	1974	Rotterdam, Netherlands	Carpet	(South Africa) Frew McMillan	(France) Pierre Barthès (Romania) Ilie Năstase	3–6, 6–4, 6–3
Win	13.	1974	Munich WCT, Germany	Carpet	(South Africa) Frew McMillan	(France) Pierre Barthès (Romania) Ilie Năstase	6–2, 7–6
Win	14.	1974	Johannesburg WCT, South Africa	Hard	(South Africa) Frew McMillan	(United States) Jim McManus (Rhodesia) Andrew Pattison	6–2, 6–4, 7–6
Win	15.	1974	World Doubles WCT, Montreal	Carpet	(South Africa) Frew McMillan	(Australia) Owen Davidson (Australia) John Newcombe	6–2, 6–7, 6–1, 6–2
Loss	4.	1974	Vienna, Austria	Hard (i)	(South Africa) Frew McMillan	(South Africa) Raymond Moore (Rhodesia) Andrew Pattison	4–6, 7–5, 4–6
Loss	5.	1974	Stockholm, Sweden	Hard (i)	(South Africa) Frew McMillan	(Netherlands) Tom Okker (United States) Marty Riessen	6–2, 3–6, 4–6
Win	16.	1974	Johannesburg, South Africa	Hard	(South Africa) Frew McMillan	(Netherlands) Tom Okker (United States) Marty Riessen	7–6, 6–4, 6–3
Win	17.	1975	Rotterdam WCT, Netherlands	Carpet	(South Africa) Frew McMillan	(Spain) José Higueras (Hungary) Balázs Taróczy	6–2, 6–2
Win	18.	1975	Munich WCT, Germany	Carpet	(South Africa) Frew McMillan	(Italy) Corrado Barazzutti (Italy) Antonio Zugarelli	6–3, 6–4
Win	19.	1975	Monte Carlo WCT, Monaco	Clay	(South Africa) Frew McMillan	(United States) Arthur Ashe (Netherlands) Tom Okker	6–3, 6–2
Loss	6.	1975	Johannesburg WCT, South Africa	Hard	(South Africa) Frew McMillan	(United States) Arthur Ashe (Netherlands) Tom Okker	3–6, 2–6
Loss	7.	1975	Tehran, Iran	Clay	(South Africa) Frew McMillan	(Spain) Juan Gisbert (Spain) Manuel Orantes	5–7, 7–6, 1–6, 4–6
Win	20.	1975	Stockholm, Sweden	Hard (i)	(South Africa) Frew McMillan	(United States) Charlie Pasarell (United States) Roscoe Tanner	3–6, 6–3, 6–4
Win	21.	1976	Columbus WCT, US	Carpet	(South Africa) Frew McMillan	(United States) Arthur Ashe (Netherlands) Tom Okker	7–6, 6–4
Win	22.	1976	Baltimore WCT, US	Carpet	(South Africa) Frew McMillan	(Romania) Ilie Năstase (United States) Cliff Richey	3–6, 7–6, 6–4
Loss	8.	1976	Philadelphia WCT, US	Carpet	(South Africa) Frew McMillan	(Australia) Rod Laver (United States) Dennis Ralston	6–7, 6–7
Win	23.	1976	Montreal, Canada	Hard	(Mexico) Raúl Ramírez	(Spain) Juan Gisbert (Spain) Manuel Orantes	6–2, 6–1
Loss	9.	1976	San Francisco, US	Carpet	(United States) Brian Gottfried	(United States) Dick Stockton (United States) Roscoe Tanner	3–6, 4–6
Loss	10.	1976	Madrid, Spain	Clay	(South Africa) Frew McMillan	(Poland) Wojtek Fibak (Mexico) Raúl Ramírez	6–4, 5–7, 3–6
Loss	11.	1976	Barcelona, Spain	Clay	(South Africa) Frew McMillan	(United States) Brian Gottfried (Mexico) Raúl Ramírez	6–7, 4–6
Win	24.	1976	Vienna, Austria	Hard (i)	(South Africa) Frew McMillan	(United States) Brian Gottfried (Mexico) Raúl Ramírez	6–4, 4–0 RET
Win	25.	1976	Cologne, Germany	Carpet	(South Africa) Frew McMillan	(Rhodesia) Colin Dowdeswell (United States) Mike Estep	6–1, 3–6, 7–6
Win	26.	1976	Stockholm, Sweden	Hard (i)	(South Africa) Frew McMillan	(Netherlands) Tom Okker (United States) Marty Riessen	6–4, 4–6, 6–4
Win	27.	1977	Philadelphia WCT, US	Carpet	(South Africa) Frew McMillan	(Poland) Wojtek Fibak (Netherlands) Tom Okker	6–1, 1–6, 6–3
Loss	12.	1977	Little Rock, US	Carpet	(South Africa) Frew McMillan	(Australia) Colin Dibley (Pakistan) Haroon Rahim	7–6, 3–6, 3–6
Win	28.	1977	Springfield, US	Carpet	(South Africa) Frew McMillan	(Romania) Ion Țiriac (Argentina) Guillermo Vilas	7–6, 6–2
Win	29.	1977	San Jose, US	Hard	(South Africa) Frew McMillan	(United States) Tom Gorman (Australia) Geoff Masters	6–2, 6–3
Win	30.	1977	Palm Springs, US	Hard	(South Africa) Frew McMillan	(United States) Marty Riessen (United States) Roscoe Tanner	7–6, 7–6
Win	31.	1977	Johannesburg, South Africa	Hard	(South Africa) Frew McMillan	(United States) Charlie Pasarell (United States) Erik van Dillen	6–2, 6–0
Win	32.	1977	La Costa, US	Hard	(South Africa) Frew McMillan	(Australia) Ray Ruffels (Australia) Allan Stone	6–4, 6–2
Win	33.	1977	Los Angeles PSW, US	Carpet	(South Africa) Frew McMillan	(United States) Robert Lutz (United States) Stan Smith	6–3, 6–4
Win	34.	1977	Jackson, US	Carpet	(South Africa) Frew McMillan	(Australia) Phil Dent (Australia) Ken Rosewall	6–2, 7–6
Loss	13.	1977	Las Vegas, US	Hard	(Mexico) Raúl Ramírez	(United States) Robert Lutz (United States) Stan Smith	3–6, 6–3, 4–6
Win	35.	1977	Hamburg, Germany	Clay	(West Germany) Karl Meiler	(Australia) Phil Dent (Australia) Kim Warwick	3–6, 6–3, 6–4, 6–4
Loss	14.	1977	Gstaad, Switzerland	Clay	(Rhodesia) Colin Dowdeswell	(West Germany) Jürgen Fassbender (West Germany) Karl Meiler	4–6, 6–7
Loss	15.	1977	Cincinnati, US	Clay	(United States) Roscoe Tanner	(Australia) John Alexander (Australia) Phil Dent	3–6, 6–7
Win	36.	1977	Montreal, Canada	Hard	(Mexico) Raúl Ramírez	(United States) Fred McNair (United States) Sherwood Stewart	6–4, 3–6, 6–2
Win	37.	1977	US Open, New York City	Clay	(South Africa) Frew McMillan	(United States) Brian Gottfried (Mexico) Raúl Ramírez	6–4, 6–0
Loss	16.	1977	Tehran, Iran	Clay	(South Africa) Frew McMillan	(Romania) Ion Țiriac (Argentina) Guillermo Vilas	6–1, 1–6, 4–6
Win	38.	1977	Madrid, Spain	Clay	(South Africa) Frew McMillan	(Spain) Antonio Muñoz (Spain) Manuel Orantes	6–7, 7–6, 6–3, 6–1
Loss	17.	1977	Barcelona, Spain	Clay	(South Africa) Frew McMillan	(Poland) Wojtek Fibak (Czechoslovakia) Jan Kodeš	0–6, 4–6
Win	39.	1977	Vienna, Austria	Hard (i)	(South Africa) Frew McMillan	(Poland) Wojtek Fibak (Czechoslovakia) Jan Kodeš	6–4, 6–3
Win	40.	1977	Cologne, Germany	Carpet	(South Africa) Frew McMillan	(United States) Fred McNair (United States) Sherwood Stewart	6–3, 7–5
Win	41.	1978	Masters, New York City	Carpet	(South Africa) Frew McMillan	(United States) Bob Lutz (United States) Stan Smith	7–5, 7–6, 6–3
Win	42.	1978	Philadelphia WCT, US	Carpet	(South Africa) Frew McMillan	(United States) Vitas Gerulaitis (United States) Sandy Mayer	6–4, 6–4
Win	43.	1978	Richmond WCT, US	Carpet	(South Africa) Frew McMillan	(United States) Vitas Gerulaitis (United States) Sandy Mayer	6–3, 7–5
Win	44.	1978	St. Louis WCT, US	Carpet	(South Africa) Frew McMillan	(Poland) Wojtek Fibak (Netherlands) Tom Okker	6–3, 6–2
Loss	18.	1978	Palm Springs, US	Hard	(South Africa) Frew McMillan	(South Africa) Raymond Moore (United States) Roscoe Tanner	4–6, 4–6
Win	45.	1978	Denver, US	Carpet	(South Africa) Frew McMillan	(United States) Fred McNair (United States) Sherwood Stewart	6–3, 6–2
Win	46.	1978	Johannesburg, South Africa	Hard	(South Africa) Frew McMillan	(Australia) Colin Dibley (Australia) Geoff Masters	7–5, 7–6
Loss	19.	1978	Las Vegas, US	Hard	(Mexico) Raúl Ramírez	(Chile) Álvaro Fillol (Chile) Jaime Fillol	3–6, 6–7
Win	47.	1978	London/Queen's Club, UK	Grass	(South Africa) Frew McMillan	(United States) Fred McNair (Mexico) Raúl Ramírez	6–2, 7–5
Win	48.	1978	Wimbledon, London	Grass	(South Africa) Frew McMillan	(United States) Peter Fleming (United States) John McEnroe	6–1, 6–4, 6–2
Loss	20.	1978	Gstaad, Switzerland	Clay	(Australia) Kim Warwick	(Australia) Mark Edmondson (Netherlands) Tom Okker	4–6, 6–1, 1–6, 4–6
Win	49.	1978	Washington, D.C., US	Clay	(United States) Arthur Ashe	(United States) Fred McNair (Mexico) Raúl Ramírez	6–3, 6–4
Loss	21.	1978	Vienna, Austria	Hard (i)	(South Africa) Frew McMillan	(Paraguay) Víctor Pecci (Hungary) Balázs Taróczy	3–6, 7–6, 4–6
Loss	22.	1978	Cologne, Germany	Hard (i)	(South Africa) Frew McMillan	(United States) Peter Fleming (United States) John McEnroe	3–6, 2–6
Loss	23.	1978	Johannesburg, South Africa	Hard	(South Africa) Frew McMillan	(United States) Peter Fleming (South Africa) Raymond Moore	3–6, 6–7
Win	50.	1979	Båstad, Sweden	Clay	(Switzerland) Heinz Günthardt	(Australia) Mark Edmondson (Australia) John Marks	6–2, 6–2
Loss	24.	1979	Toronto, Canada	Hard	(Switzerland) Heinz Günthardt	(United States) Peter Fleming (United States) John McEnroe	7–6, 6–7, 1–6
Win	51.	1979	Basel, Switzerland	Hard (i)	(South Africa) Frew McMillan	(United States) Brian Gottfried (Mexico) Raúl Ramírez	6–3, 6–4
Win	52.	1979	Vienna, Austria	Hard (i)	(South Africa) Frew McMillan	(United States) Brian Gottfried (Mexico) Raúl Ramírez	6–4, 3–6, 6–1
Win	53.	1979	Johannesburg, South Africa	Hard	(South Africa) Frew McMillan	(United States) Mike Cahill (United Kingdom) Buster Mottram	1–6, 6–1, 6–4
Win	54.	1980	Johannesburg, South Africa	Hard	(South Africa) Frew McMillan	(Zimbabwe Rhodesia) Colin Dowdeswell (Switzerland) Heinz Günthardt	6–4, 6–3
Win	55.	1980	Munich, Germany	Clay	(Switzerland) Heinz Günthardt	(Australia) David Carter (New Zealand) Chris Lewis	7–6, 6–1
Loss	25.	1980	Basel, Switzerland	Hard (i)	(South Africa) Frew McMillan	(South Africa) Kevin Curren (United States) Steve Denton	7–6, 4–6, 4–6

== Allegations and conviction of sexual assault and rape ==
Bob Hewitt
- Born: Robert Anthony John Hewitt
- Status: Paroled
- Convictions: 23 March 2015 (guilty plea)
- Criminal charges: Child grooming Sexual activity with a minor
- Penalty: 6 years imprisonment (served 3 years 6 months and 22 days)

In 2011, a six-month investigation by The Boston Globe disclosed allegations from one adult woman who was coached as a girl by Hewitt's assistant coach. The investigation was prompted by the revelations of a former student in March 2011, who claimed that, beginning in the 1970s, Hewitt abused or harassed her when she was as young as 10 years old. Interviews with contemporaries in the United States and South Africa indicated that there had been no rumours about misconduct by Hewitt at the time of the alleged events. The South African Tennis Union investigated after 1992, but no legal action was taken against Hewitt.

The Boston Globe's investigation and report of the victim prompted the request and was followed up by a letter signed by his alleged victim asking for his removal from the Hall of Fame. A November 2011 investigative piece by Mary Carillo of HBO's Real Sports with Bryant Gumbel includes interviews with the alleged victim and others who claim that Hewitt abused them. Hewitt did not agree to be interviewed for the piece.

In May 2012, Hewitt's one-time mixed doubles partner Billie Jean King spoke to the Washingtonian, saying "I don't feel good about Bob Hewitt. I played mixed with him. We won the French Open together in 1970. I'm not happy. I am very upset." On 15 November 2012, after months of investigation, Hewitt lost his place in the International Tennis Hall of Fame: "His legacy ceases to exist in the Hall of Fame", said Mark Stenning, executive director of the International Tennis Hall of Fame. "As of today, his plaque will be removed from the Hall of Fame. His name will be removed from our website and all other materials, and from the perspective of the Hall of Fame, he is suspended from the Hall of Fame." On 6 April 2016, Hewitt was officially expelled from the Tennis Hall of Fame.

=== Conviction ===
Hewitt was charged in June 2014 with rape of two underage students in the 1980s and 1990s, and went on trial in 2015. On 23 March 2015, Hewitt was found guilty of two counts of rape and one of sexual assault of minors by the South Gauteng High Court in South Africa, and was sentenced in May to an effective six years in jail. One of his victims was 13 in 1980 when Hewitt, who was her tennis coach, raped her. Heather Crowe Conner of West Newbury was a 14-year-old in 1975 when Hewitt began raping her. Another victim was 12 in 1982 when Hewitt assaulted her during a tennis lesson.

Hewitt was released on parole in April 2020. At the time Hewitt had served three years, six months and 22 days of his six-year sentence.
