= John Pearce (tennis) =

Australian tennis player (1923–1992)

- Full name: John J. Pearce
- Country (sports): Australia
- Born: 13 May 1923; Sydney, Australia
- Died: 1992 (aged 68–69); Scotland
- Plays: Right-handed

Singles

Grand Slam singles results
- Australian Open: QF (1960, 1961)
- French Open: 1R (1960)
- Wimbledon: 2R (1960)

Doubles

Grand Slam doubles results
- Australian Open: SF (1961)
- Wimbledon: 3R (1960)

Mixed doubles

Grand Slam mixed doubles results
- Australian Open: F (1961)
- Wimbledon: 2R (1960)

John J. Pearce (13 May 1923 – 1992) was an Australian amateur tennis player who competed in the mid-20th century. He reached the quarterfinals of the Australian Championships in 1960 and 1961.

Pearce died in Scotland in 1992.

== Grand Slam tournament finals ==
=== Mixed doubles (1 runner-up) ===
Result	Year	Championship	Surface	Partner	Opponents	Score
Loss	1961	Australian Championships	Grass	(Australia) Mary Carter Reitano	(Australia) Jan Lehane (Australia) Bob Hewitt	7–9, 2–6
