= 1962 Australian Championships =

- Date: 5–15 January 1962
- Edition: 50th
- Category: Grand Slam (ITF)
- Surface: Grass
- Location: Sydney, Australia
- Venue: White City Tennis Club

Champions

Men's singles
- (Australia) Rod Laver

Women's singles
- (Australia) Margaret Smith

Men's doubles
- (Australia) Roy Emerson / (Australia) Neale Fraser

Women's doubles
- (Australia) Margaret Smith / (Australia) Robyn Ebbern

Mixed doubles
- (Australia) Lesley Turner / (Australia) Fred Stolle
- Australian Championships

The 1962 Australian Championships was a tennis tournament that took place on outdoor Grass courts at the White City Tennis Club, Sydney, Australia from 5 January to 15 January. It was the 50th edition of the Australian Championships (now known as the Australian Open), the 14th held in Sydney, and the first Grand Slam tournament of the year. The singles titles were taken by Rod Laver and Margaret Smith. Laver's win was the first step towards his first Grand Slam.

== Champions ==
=== Men's singles ===
(Australia) Rod Laver defeated (Australia) Roy Emerson 8–6, 0–6, 6–4, 6–4

=== Women's singles ===
(Australia) Margaret Smith defeated (Australia) Jan Lehane 6–0, 6–2

=== Men's doubles ===
(Australia) Roy Emerson / (Australia) Neale Fraser defeated (Australia) Bob Hewitt / (Australia) Fred Stolle 4–6, 4–6, 6–1, 6–4, 11–9

=== Women's doubles ===
(Australia) Robyn Ebbern / (Australia) Margaret Smith defeated (United States) Darlene Hard / (Australia) Mary Carter Reitano 6–4, 6–4

=== Mixed doubles ===
(Australia) Lesley Turner / (Australia) Fred Stolle defeated (United States) Darlene Hard / (United Kingdom) Roger Taylor 6–3, 9–7

Preceded by 1961 U.S. National Championships	Grand Slams	Succeeded by 1962 French Championships
