= Jim Shepherd =

Australian tennis player

- Full name: James Shepherd
- Country (sports): Australia
- Born: c. 1940; Australia
- Turned pro: 1962
- Retired: 1968
- Plays: Right-handed

Singles
- Career record: 19
- Career titles: 6

Grand Slam singles results
- Australian Open: 1R, 2R (1960, 1961, 1962, 1964)
- Wimbledon: 1R (1962)

James Shepherd (born 1940) is a former Australian professional tennis player.

== Career ==
In 1962, he was defeated by Premjit Lall in the second round at the Australian Championships in men's singles. He also defeated Peter McPherson in the first round by the third section In the same year he reached the first with Jimmy Tattersall and second round with Roger Taylor at the 1962 Wimbledon Championships. In 1964 he reached the second round again with Gary Cruth at the Australian Open. In 1968 Shepherd made his last match with John Newcombe at the Pacific Coast Professionals before he retired.
