= Warren Jacques =

Australian tennis player (1938–2025)

- Country (sports): Australia
- Born: 10 March 1938 Sydney, New South Wales, Australia
- Died: 15 August 2025 (aged 87) Sydney, New South Wales, Australia

Grand Slam singles results
- Australian Open: 3R (1966)
- French Open: 2R (1962)
- Wimbledon: 4R (1961)
- US Open: 1R (1968)

Grand Slam doubles results
- Australian Open: SF (1967)

Warren Jacques (10 March 1938 – 15 August 2025) was an Australian tennis coach and player.

== Biography ==
Jacques, a native of Sydney, was active on the international tour in the 1960s. He reached the fourth round of the 1961 Wimbledon Championships, beating Jørgen Ulrich, Ingo Buding and Donald Dell en route. His title wins included the Welsh Championships in 1963.

During the 1980s, while working in Dallas, Jacques was the tour coach of Texas-based players Kevin Curren, Steve Denton and Bill Scanlon. He guided both Curren and Scanlon to the world's top 10, while Denton made it as high as 12 under Jacques. In 1987 he was appointed captain of the Great Britain Davis Cup team and stayed in the position for three Davis Cup campaigns.

Jacques died in Sydney on 15 August 2025, at the age of 87.
