= 1966 Davis Cup America Zone =

International tennis competition

The America Zone was one of the three regional zones of the 1966 Davis Cup.

6 teams entered the America Zone, with the winner going on to compete in the Inter-Zonal Zone against the winners of the Eastern Zone and Europe Zone. The United States defeated Mexico in the final and progressed to the Inter-Zonal Zone.

== Draw ==
Quarterfinals; 8 April–3 May
Mexico
bye
Buenos Aires, Argentina (clay)
Argentina	3
Chile	2
Caracas, Venezuela (hard)
Venezuela	2
Caribbean/West Indies	3
bye
United States

Semifinals; 19–30 May
Mexico City, Mexico (clay)
Mexico	4
Argentina	1
Kingston, Jamaica
Caribbean/West Indies	1
United States	4

Final; 13–15 August
Cleveland, OH, United States (hard)
Mexico	0
United States	5

== Quarterfinals ==
=== Argentina vs. Chile ===
Argentina
3
Buenos Aires Lawn Tennis Club, Buenos Aires, Argentina
8–10 April 1966
Clay

Chile
2

			1	2	3	4	5
1	(Argentina) (Chile)	Eduardo Soriano; Patricio Rodríguez	6; 1	5; 7	4; 6	3; 6
2	(Argentina) (Chile)	Roberto Aubone; Patricio Cornejo	8; 6	6; 1	3; 6	5; 7	6; 2
3	(Argentina) (Chile)	Roberto Aubone / Eduardo Soriano; Omar Pabst / Patricio Rodríguez	3; 6	5; 7	6; 2	7; 5	6; 2
4	(Argentina) (Chile)	Eduardo Soriano; Patricio Cornejo	6; 2	9; 7	6; 2
5	(Argentina) (Chile)	Roberto Aubone; Patricio Rodríguez	1; 6	1; 6	0; 6

=== Venezuela vs. Caribbean/West Indies ===
Venezuela
2
Caracas, Venezuela
1–3 May 1966
Hard

Caribbean/West Indies
3

			1	2	3	4	5
1	(Venezuela) (Cricket West Indies)	Humphrey Hose; Richard Russell	6; 4	3; 6	7; 5	6; 8	0; 6
2	(Venezuela) (Cricket West Indies)	Isaías Pimentel; Lance Lumsden	7; 5	6; 0	6; 2
3	(Venezuela) (Cricket West Indies)	Eduardo Álvarez / Isaías Pimentel; Lance Lumsden / Richard Russell	5; 7	6; 2	5; 7	6; 4	6; 3
4	(Venezuela) (Cricket West Indies)	Humphrey Hose; Lance Lumsden	4; 6	7; 9	6; 1	0; 6
5	(Venezuela) (Cricket West Indies)	Isaías Pimentel; Richard Russell	4; 6	7; 9	6; 1	6; 2	6; 8

== Semifinals ==
=== Mexico vs. Argentina ===
Mexico
4
Centro Deportivo Chapultepec, Mexico City, Mexico
28–30 May 1966
Clay

Argentina
1

			1	2	3	4	5
1	(Mexico) (Argentina)	Rafael Osuna; Roberto Aubone	6; 2	6; 2	7; 5
2	(Mexico) (Argentina)	Luis-Augusto García; Eduardo Soriano	6; 2	6; 3	6; 1
3	(Mexico) (Argentina)	Marcello Lara / Rafael Osuna; Roberto Aubone / Eduardo Soriano	5; 7	6; 3	10; 12	8; 6	12; 14
4	(Mexico) (Argentina)	Luis-Augusto García; Roberto Aubone	6; 2	6; 4	6; 3
5	(Mexico) (Argentina)	Rafael Osuna; Eduardo Soriano	9; 7	4; 6	14; 12	4; 6	7; 5

=== Caribbean/West Indies vs. United States ===
Caribbean/West Indies
1
St. Andrew Club, Kingston, Jamaica
19–21 May 1966

United States
4

			1	2	3	4	5
1	(Cricket West Indies) (United States)	Lance Lumsden; Arthur Ashe	0; 6	1; 6	2; 6
2	(Cricket West Indies) (United States)	Richard Russell; Cliff Richey	2; 6	4; 6	0; 6
3	(Cricket West Indies) (United States)	Lance Lumsden / Richard Russell; Arthur Ashe / Charlie Pasarell	6; 4	7; 9	14; 12	4; 6	6; 4
4	(Cricket West Indies) (United States)	Lance Lumsden; Cliff Richey	3; 6	3; 6	2; 6
5	(Cricket West Indies) (United States)	Richard Russell; Arthur Ashe	6; 8	4; 6	6; 8

== Final ==
=== United States vs. Mexico ===
United States
5
Harold Clark Courts, Cleveland, OH, United States
13–15 August 1966
Hard

Mexico
0

			1	2	3	4	5
1	(United States) (Mexico)	Clark Graebner; Joaquín Loyo Mayo	6; 0	4; 6	6; 1	3; 6	6; 3
2	(United States) (Mexico)	Dennis Ralston; Rafael Osuna	6; 4	2; 6	7; 5	6; 1
3	(United States) (Mexico)	Clark Graebner / Dennis Ralston; Joaquín Loyo Mayo / Rafael Osuna	6; 1	6; 4	6; 0
4	(United States) (Mexico)	Cliff Richey; Marcello Lara	11; 13	6; 0	12; 10	6; 4
5	(United States) (Mexico)	Clark Graebner; Rafael Osuna	6; 3	6; 4	6; 4
