= 1965 Davis Cup Europe Zone =

International tennis competition

The Europe Zone was one of the three regional zones of the 1965 Davis Cup.

32 teams entered the Europe Zone, with the winner going on to compete in the Inter-Zonal Zone against the winners of the America Zone and Eastern Zone. Spain defeated South Africa in the final and progressed to the Inter-Zonal Zone.

== Draw ==
First Round; 28 April–3 May
Sweden	4
Poland	1
Czechoslovakia	w/o
Monaco
Italy	5
Portugal	0
Hungary	2
Brazil	3
West Germany	5
Switzerland	0
Turkey	2
Luxembourg	3
Spain	5
Greece	0
Belgium	1
Chile	3
Egypt
Norway	w/o
Netherlands	0
South Africa	4
Ireland	0
Denmark	3
Israel	1
Great Britain	4
Rhodesia	w/o
Soviet Union
Morocco	0
Yugoslavia	5
Finland	1
Austria	4
bye
France

Second Round; 13–16 May
Stockholm, Sweden (clay)
Sweden	2
Czechoslovakia	3
Milan, Italy (clay)
Italy	3
Brazil	2
Wiesbaden, West Germany
West Germany	5
Luxembourg	0
Barcelona, Spain (clay)
Spain	5
Chile	0
Oslo, Norway (clay)
Norway	0
South Africa	5
Copenhagen, Denmark (clay)
Denmark	1
Great Britain	3
Zagreb, Yugoslavia
Rhodesia	0
Yugoslavia	5
Vienna, Austria
Austria	0
France	5

Quarterfinals; 10–13 June
Prague, Czechoslovakia (clay)
Czechoslovakia	3
Italy	2
Barcelona, Spain (clay)
West Germany	1
Spain	4
Eastbourne, England (grass)
South Africa	3
Great Britain	2
Paris, France (clay)
Yugoslavia	0
France	5

Semifinals; 16–18 July
Prague, Czechoslovakia (clay)
Czechoslovakia	1
Spain	4
Paris, France (clay)
South Africa	4
France	1

Final; 30 July–1 August
Barcelona, Spain (clay)
Spain	4
South Africa	1

== First round ==
=== Sweden vs. Poland ===
Sweden
4
Kungliga tennishallen, Stockholm, Sweden
30 April–2 May 1965
Clay

Poland
1

			1	2	3	4	5
1	(Sweden) (Poland)	Jan-Erik Lundqvist; Tadeusz Nowicki	6; 1	6; 1	6; 0
2	(Sweden) (Poland)	Lars Ölander; Wiesław Gąsiorek	3; 6	7; 9	3; 6
3	(Sweden) (Poland)	Lennart Bergelin / Jan-Erik Lundqvist; Tadeusz Nowicki / Mieczysław Rybarczyk	7; 5	4; 6	2; 6	6; 1	6; 3
4	(Sweden) (Poland)	Lars Ölander; Wiesław Nowicki	6; 4	0; 6	6; 2	9; 7
5	(Sweden) (Poland)	Jan-Erik Lundqvist; Wiesław Gąsiorek	6; 3	6; 1	3; 6	8; 6

=== Italy vs. Portugal ===
Italy
5
Pescara, Italy
30 April–2 May 1965
Clay

Portugal
0

			1	2	3	4	5
1	(Italy) (Portugal)	Giordano Maioli; João Roquette	6; 0	6; 3	6; 0
2	(Italy) (Portugal)	Nicola Pietrangeli; Alfredo Vaz Pinto	6; 3	6; 2	6; 1
3	(Italy) (Portugal)	Giordano Maioli / Nicola Pietrangeli; João Lagos / Alfredo Vaz Pinto	6; 2	6; 3	6; 2
4	(Italy) (Portugal)	Nicola Pietrangeli; João Roquette	6; 1	6; 0	6; 0
5	(Italy) (Portugal)	Giordano Maioli; Alfredo Vaz Pinto	6; 2	6; 3	6; 2

=== Hungary vs. Brazil ===
Hungary
2
Budapest, Hungary
30 April–2 May 1965

Brazil
3

			1	2	3	4	5
1	(Hungary) (Brazil)	István Gulyás; Ronald Barnes	6; 3	6; 0	6; 2
2	(Hungary) (Brazil)	Attila Korpás; Thomaz Koch	3; 6	2; 6	6; 8
3	(Hungary) (Brazil)	István Gulyás / András Szikszay; Ronald Barnes / Thomaz Koch	5; 7	8; 6	1; 6	2; 6
4	(Hungary) (Brazil)	Attila Korpás; Ronald Barnes	6; 8	6; 8	5; 7
5	(Hungary) (Brazil)	István Gulyás; Thomaz Koch	3; 6	5; 7	6; 4	6; 4	6; 1

=== West Germany vs. Switzerland ===
West Germany
5
Essen, West Germany
30 April–2 May 1965

Switzerland
0

			1	2	3	4	5
1	(West Germany) (Switzerland)	Ingo Buding; Theodor Stalder	6; 1	6; 0	6; 3
2	(West Germany) (Switzerland)	Wilhelm Bungert; Dimitri Sturdza	6; 3	4; 6	7; 9	7; 5	7; 5
3	(West Germany) (Switzerland)	Harald Elschenbroich / Christian Kuhnke; Dimitri Sturdza / Matthias Werren	10; 8	6; 2	6; 4
4	(West Germany) (Switzerland)	Wilhelm Bungert; Theodor Stalder	6; 2	2; 6	7; 5	3; 6	6; 2
5	(West Germany) (Switzerland)	Ingo Buding; Dimitri Sturdza	6; 4	6; 4	3; 6	6; 1

=== Luxembourg vs. Turkey ===
Luxembourg
3
Mondorf-les-Bains, Luxembourg
30 April–3 May 1965

Turkey
2

			1	2	3	4	5
1	(Luxembourg) (Turkey)	Frank Baden; Ziya Kipkizilorenli	7; 5	6; 1	6; 4
2	(Luxembourg) (Turkey)	Thierry Brasseur; Nazmi Bari	3; 6	0; 6	5; 7
3	(Luxembourg) (Turkey)	Frank Baden / Jean Neuman; Engin Balas / Nazmi Bari	2; 6	6; 4	7; 9	6; 4	2; 6
4	(Luxembourg) (Turkey)	Frank Baden; Nazmi Bari	6; 4	7; 5	6; 2
5	(Luxembourg) (Turkey)	Thierry Brasseur; Ziya Kipkizilorenli	3; 6	6; 2	4; 6	8; 6	6; 2

=== Spain vs. Greece ===
Spain
5
Real Club de Tenis, Barcelona, Spain
30 April–2 May 1965
Clay

Greece
0

			1	2	3	4	5
1	(Spain) (Greece)	José Luis Arilla; Nikolaos Kalyvas	6; 2	6; 1	6; 1
2	(Spain) (Greece)	Manuel Santana; Nicholas Kalogeropoulos	6; 2	6; 0	6; 4
3	(Spain) (Greece)	José Luis Arilla / Manuel Santana; Periclis Gavrilidis / Nicholas Kalogeropoulos	6; 1	6; 2	6; 2
4	(Spain) (Greece)	Juan Manuel Couder; Nikolaos Kalyvas	6; 1	6; 1	6; 4
5	(Spain) (Greece)	José Luis Arilla; Nicholas Kalogeropoulos	6; 3	6; 2	6; 2

=== Belgium vs. Chile ===
Belgium
1
Brussels, Belgium
30 April–2 May 1965

Chile
3

			1	2	3	4	5
1	(Belgium) (Chile)	Eric Drossart; Jaime Pinto Bravo	3; 6	4; 6	6; 3	1; 6
2	(Belgium) (Chile)	Jacques Brichant; Ernesto Aguirre	4; 6	6; 3	3; 6	1; 6
3	(Belgium) (Chile)	Eric Drossart / Claude De Gronckel; Ernesto Aguirre / Omar Pabst	6; 2	4; 6	9; 11	5; 7
4	(Belgium) (Chile)	Eric Drossart; Ernesto Aguirre	6; 2	6; 4	6; 2
5	(Belgium) (Chile)	Jacques Brichant; Jaime Pinto Bravo	8; 6	8; 6	3; 5			not completed

=== Netherlands vs. South Africa ===
Netherlands
0
Scheveningen, Netherlands
30 April–2 May 1965
Clay

South Africa
4

			1	2	3	4	5
1	(Netherlands) (South Africa)	Jan Hajer; Cliff Drysdale	0; 6	2; 6	1; 6
2	(Netherlands) (South Africa)	Tom Okker; Keith Diepraam	5; 7	4; 6	3; 6
3	(Netherlands) (South Africa)	Pieter van Eijsden / Tom Okker; Keith Diepraam / Cliff Drysdale	2; 6	2; 6	2; 6
4	(Netherlands) (South Africa)	Tom Okker; Cliff Drysdale	2; 6	1; 6	2; 6
5	(Netherlands) (South Africa)	Jan Hajer; Keith Diepraam	6; 1	4; 6	6; 4	7; 9	3; 3	not completed

=== Ireland vs. Denmark ===
Ireland
0
Dublin, Ireland
30 April–2 May 1965

Denmark
3

			1	2	3	4	5
1	(Republic of Ireland) (Denmark)	Peter Jackson; Torben Ulrich	1; 6	1; 6	1; 6
2	(Republic of Ireland) (Denmark)	Derek Arthurs; Jørgen Ulrich	3; 6	1; 6	1; 6
3	(Republic of Ireland) (Denmark)	Derek Arthurs / Michael Hickey; Jørgen Ulrich / Torben Ulrich	3; 6	1; 6	4; 6
4	(Republic of Ireland) (Denmark)	Derek Arthurs; Torben Ulrich						not played
5	(Republic of Ireland) (Denmark)	Peter Jackson; Jørgen Ulrich						not played

=== Great Britain vs. Israel ===
Great Britain
4
Chandos Lawn Tennis Club, London, England
28–30 April 1965
Clay

Israel
1

			1	2	3	4	5
1	(United Kingdom) (Israel)	Roger Taylor; Oded Shay	6; 1	6; 0	6; 1
2	(United Kingdom) (Israel)	Mike Sangster; Eleazar Davidman	6; 3	6; 2	5; 7	5; 7	4; 6
3	(United Kingdom) (Israel)	Mike Sangster / Bobby Wilson; David Asz / Eleazar Davidman	6; 1	6; 1	6; 3
4	(United Kingdom) (Israel)	Mike Sangster; Oded Shay	6; 1	6; 1	6; 0
5	(United Kingdom) (Israel)	Roger Taylor; Eleazar Davidman	6; 1	8; 6	7; 5

=== Yugoslavia vs. Morocco ===
Yugoslavia
5
Zagreb, Yugoslavia
28–30 April 1965

Morocco
0

			1	2	3	4	5
1	(Socialist Federal Republic of Yugoslavia) (Morocco)	Nikola Pilić; Lahcen Chadli	6; 1	6; 3	4; 6	6; 4
2	(Socialist Federal Republic of Yugoslavia) (Morocco)	Boro Jovanović; Mohammed-Haibabi Bouchaib	6; 2	6; 1	6; 0
3	(Socialist Federal Republic of Yugoslavia) (Morocco)	Boro Jovanović / Nikola Pilić; Mohammed-Haibabi Bouchaib / Ali Laroussi	6; 2	6; 4	6; 1
4	(Socialist Federal Republic of Yugoslavia) (Morocco)	Nikola Pilić; Mohammed-Haibabi Bouchaib	6; 2	6; 4	6; 1
5	(Socialist Federal Republic of Yugoslavia) (Morocco)	Boro Jovanović; Lahcen Chadli	6; 1	6; 4

=== Finland vs. Austria ===
Finland
1
Helsinki, Finland
30 April–2 May 1965

Austria
4

			1	2	3	4	5
1	(Finland) (Austria)	Pekka Säilä; Georg Pazderka	6; 4	3; 6	2; 6	6; 3	6; 4
2	(Finland) (Austria)	Sten Ståhle; Norbert Klatil	1; 6	4; 6	6; 2	0; 6
3	(Finland) (Austria)	Pekka Säilä / Rauno Suominen; Norbert Klatil / Georg Pazderka	0; 6	1; 6	7; 9
4	(Finland) (Austria)	Sten Ståhle; Georg Pazderka	2; 6	6; 4	2; 6	1; 6
5	(Finland) (Austria)	Pekka Säilä; Norbert Klatil	0; 6	4; 6	3; 6

== Second round ==
=== Sweden vs. Czechoslovakia ===
Sweden
2
Kungliga tennishallen, Stockholm, Sweden
14–16 May 1965
Clay

Czechoslovakia
3

			1	2	3	4	5
1	(Sweden) (Czechoslovakia)	Jan-Erik Lundqvist; Milan Holeček	6; 4	10; 8	6; 2
2	(Sweden) (Czechoslovakia)	Lars Ölander; Jiří Javorský	4; 6	4; 6	3; 6
3	(Sweden) (Czechoslovakia)	Jan-Erik Lundqvist / Lars Ölander; Jiří Javorský / Štěpán Koudelka	6; 4	3; 6	4; 6	5; 7
4	(Sweden) (Czechoslovakia)	Jan-Erik Lundqvist; Jiří Javorský	6; 4	6; 2	6; 3
5	(Sweden) (Czechoslovakia)	Lars Ölander; Milan Holeček	0; 6	1; 6	4; 6

=== Italy vs. Brazil ===
Italy
3
Milan, Italy
14–16 May 1965
Clay

Brazil
2

			1	2	3	4	5
1	(Italy) (Brazil)	Nicola Pietrangeli; Ronald Barnes	6; 4	9; 7	6; 3
2	(Italy) (Brazil)	Giuseppe Merlo; Thomaz Koch	6; 4	6; 2	6; 4
3	(Italy) (Brazil)	Giordano Maioli / Nicola Pietrangeli; Ronald Barnes / José Edison Mandarino	2; 6	4; 6	5; 7
4	(Italy) (Brazil)	Nicola Pietrangeli; Thomaz Koch	7; 5	6; 3	6; 2
5	(Italy) (Brazil)	Giuseppe Merlo; Ronald Barnes	4; 6	7; 9	6; 2	3; 6

=== West Germany vs. Luxembourg ===
West Germany
5
Wiesbaden, West Germany
14–16 May 1965

Luxembourg
0

			1	2	3	4	5
1	(West Germany) (Luxembourg)	Wilhelm Bungert; Thierry Brasseur	6; 0	6; 4	6; 1
2	(West Germany) (Luxembourg)	Christian Kuhnke; Frank Baden	6; 3	6; 0	6; 0
3	(West Germany) (Luxembourg)	Ingo Buding / Harald Elschenbroich; Frank Baden / Thierry Brasseur	6; 3	6; 2	6; 2
4	(West Germany) (Luxembourg)	Christian Kuhnke; Thierry Brasseur	6; 1	6; 1	6; 0
5	(West Germany) (Luxembourg)	Wilhelm Bungert; Frank Baden	7; 5	6; 4	4; 6	6; 3

=== Spain vs. Chile ===
Spain
5
Real Club de Tenis, Barcelona, Spain
14–16 May 1965
Clay

Chile
0

			1	2	3	4	5
1	(Spain) (Chile)	Juan Manuel Couder; Jaime Pinto Bravo	6; 2	6; 3	6; 3
2	(Spain) (Chile)	José Luis Arilla; Omar Pabst	6; 3	6; 1	6; 3
3	(Spain) (Chile)	José Luis Arilla / Juan Manuel Couder; Ernesto Aguirre / Jaime Pinto Bravo	6; 3	6; 4	6; 1
4	(Spain) (Chile)	Juan Manuel Couder; Patricio Cornejo	6; 3	6; 2	9; 7
5	(Spain) (Chile)	Juan Gisbert; Ernesto Aguirre	6; 3	6; 2	6; 1

=== Norway vs. South Africa ===
Norway
0
Oslo, Norway
14–16 May 1965
Clay

South Africa
5

			1	2	3	4	5
1	(Norway) (South Africa)	Gunnar Høst Sjøwall; Keith Diepraam	4; 6	1; 6	4; 6
2	(Norway) (South Africa)	Finn-Dag Jagge; Cliff Drysdale	1; 6	0; 6	1; 6
3	(Norway) (South Africa)	Jarl Bibow / Finn-Dag Jagge; Keith Diepraam / Cliff Drysdale	1; 6	6; 3	1; 6	3; 6
4	(Norway) (South Africa)	Nils Elvik; Bob Maud	1; 6	0; 6	1; 6
5	(Norway) (South Africa)	Finn-Dag Jagge; Keith Diepraam	2; 6	2; 6	0; 6

=== Denmark vs. Great Britain ===
Denmark
1
Copenhagen, Denmark
14–16 May 1965
Clay

Great Britain
3

			1	2	3	4	5
1	(Denmark) (United Kingdom)	Torben Ulrich; Roger Taylor	6; 4	6; 3	6; 3
2	(Denmark) (United Kingdom)	Jørgen Ulrich; Mike Sangster	7; 5	6; 8	0; 6	6; 4	5; 7
3	(Denmark) (United Kingdom)	Jørgen Ulrich / Torben Ulrich; Mike Sangster / Bobby Wilson	8; 10	0; 6	3; 6
4	(Denmark) (United Kingdom)	Torben Ulrich; Mike Sangster	11; 9	4; 6	4; 6	4; 6
5	(Denmark) (United Kingdom)	Jørgen Ulrich; Roger Taylor	8; 6	6; 5				not completed

=== Yugoslavia vs. Rhodesia ===
Yugoslavia
5
Zagreb, Yugoslavia
13–15 May 1965

Rhodesia
0

			1	2	3	4	5
1	(Socialist Federal Republic of Yugoslavia) (Rhodesia)	Nikola Pilić; Roy Stilwell	6; 0	3; 6	6; 4	6; 1
2	(Socialist Federal Republic of Yugoslavia) (Rhodesia)	Boro Jovanović; Roger Dowdeswell	6; 0	6; 1	7; 5
3	(Socialist Federal Republic of Yugoslavia) (Rhodesia)	Boro Jovanović / Nikola Pilić; Roger Dowdeswell / Roy Stilwell	3; 6	7; 5	7; 5	6; 1
4	(Socialist Federal Republic of Yugoslavia) (Rhodesia)	Boro Jovanović; Roy Stilwell	8; 6	6; 1	6; 1
5	(Socialist Federal Republic of Yugoslavia) (Rhodesia)	Nikola Pilić; Roger Dowdeswell	7; 5	10; 8	6; 0

=== Austria vs. France ===
Austria
0
Vienna, Austria
14–16 May 1965

France
5

			1	2	3	4	5
1	(Austria) (France)	Norbert Klatil; Pierre Darmon	6; 4	1; 6	1; 6	5; 7
2	(Austria) (France)	Georg Pazderka; Pierre Barthès	1; 6	0; 6	1; 6
3	(Austria) (France)	Georg Pazderka / Peter Pokorny; Pierre Barthès / François Jauffret	6; 4	3; 6	6; 3	2; 6	2; 6
4	(Austria) (France)	Norbert Klatil; Pierre Barthès	4; 6	2; 6	7; 9
5	(Austria) (France)	Georg Pazderka; Pierre Darmon	1; 6	0; 6	0; 6

== Quarterfinals ==
=== Czechoslovakia vs. Italy ===
Czechoslovakia
3
Prague, Czechoslovakia
11–13 June 1965
Clay

Italy
2

			1	2	3	4	5
1	(Czechoslovakia) (Italy)	Milan Holeček; Giuseppe Merlo	6; 4	5; 7	8; 6	6; 1
2	(Czechoslovakia) (Italy)	Jiří Javorský; Nicola Pietrangeli	3; 6	4; 6	6; 2	4; 6
3	(Czechoslovakia) (Italy)	Milan Holeček / Jiří Javorský; Nicola Pietrangeli / Sergio Tacchini	2; 6	6; 4	7; 5	6; 4
4	(Czechoslovakia) (Italy)	Jiří Javorský; Giuseppe Merlo	1; 6	6; 4	8; 6	6; 3
5	(Czechoslovakia) (Italy)	Milan Holeček; Nicola Pietrangeli	2; 6	2; 6	2; 6

=== Spain vs. West Germany ===
Spain
4
Real Club de Tenis, Barcelona, Spain
11–13 June 1965
Clay

West Germany
1

			1	2	3	4	5
1	(Spain) (West Germany)	Juan Gisbert; Ingo Buding	3; 6	5; 7	6; 1	4; 6
2	(Spain) (West Germany)	Manuel Santana; Wilhelm Bungert	6; 2	6; 3	6; 3
3	(Spain) (West Germany)	José Luis Arilla / Manuel Santana; Wilhelm Bungert / Christian Kuhnke	6; 2	2; 6	6; 3	6; 1
4	(Spain) (West Germany)	Manuel Santana; Ingo Buding	6; 2	6; 4	6; 3
5	(Spain) (West Germany)	Juan Gisbert; Wilhelm Bungert	2; 6	2; 6	6; 0	7; 5	6; 1

=== Great Britain vs. South Africa ===
Great Britain
2
Devonshire Park Lawn Tennis Club, Eastbourne, England
10–12 June 1965
Grass

South Africa
3

			1	2	3	4	5
1	(United Kingdom) (South Africa)	Mike Sangster; Keith Diepraam	6; 4	5; 7	3; 6	6; 2	7; 9
2	(United Kingdom) (South Africa)	Roger Taylor; Cliff Drysdale	1; 6	2; 6	5; 7
3	(United Kingdom) (South Africa)	Mike Sangster / Bobby Wilson; Keith Diepraam / Abe Segal	8; 6	6; 3	3; 6	4; 6	6; 3
4	(United Kingdom) (South Africa)	Mike Sangster; Cliff Drysdale	4; 6	6; 4	0; 6	3; 6
5	(United Kingdom) (South Africa)	Roger Taylor; Keith Diepraam	7; 5	3; 6	6; 4	6; 2

=== France vs. Yugoslavia ===
France
5
Stade Roland Garros, Paris, France
11–13 June 1965
Clay

Yugoslavia
0

			1	2	3	4	5
1	(France) (Socialist Federal Republic of Yugoslavia)	Pierre Barthès; Boro Jovanović	6; 3	7; 9	7; 5	6; 1
2	(France) (Socialist Federal Republic of Yugoslavia)	Pierre Darmon; Nikola Pilić	6; 4	6; 4	4; 6	3; 6	7; 5
3	(France) (Socialist Federal Republic of Yugoslavia)	Pierre Barthès / François Jauffret; Boro Jovanović / Nikola Pilić	6; 3	6; 2	6; 4
4	(France) (Socialist Federal Republic of Yugoslavia)	Pierre Darmon; Boro Jovanović	6; 4	6; 2	2; 6	6; 2
5	(France) (Socialist Federal Republic of Yugoslavia)	Pierre Barthès; Nikola Pilić	9; 7	2; 6	6; 3	7; 5

== Semifinals ==
=== Czechoslovakia vs. Spain ===
Czechoslovakia
1
Prague, Czechoslovakia
16–18 July 1965
Clay

Spain
4

			1	2	3	4	5
1	(Czechoslovakia) (Spain)	Milan Holeček; Juan Gisbert	3; 6	1; 6	4; 6
2	(Czechoslovakia) (Spain)	Jiří Javorský; Manuel Santana	3; 6	4; 6	4; 6
3	(Czechoslovakia) (Spain)	Milan Holeček / Jiří Javorský; José Luis Arilla / Manuel Santana	2; 6	2; 6	3; 6
4	(Czechoslovakia) (Spain)	Jiří Javorský; Juan Gisbert	4; 6	6; 2	4; 6	6; 2	7; 5
5	(Czechoslovakia) (Spain)	Milan Holeček; Manuel Santana	1; 6	4; 6	4; 6

=== France vs. South Africa ===
France
1
Stade Roland Garros, Paris, France
16–18 July 1965
Clay

South Africa
4

			1	2	3	4	5
1	(France) (South Africa)	Pierre Barthès; Cliff Drysdale	4; 6	2; 6	2; 6
2	(France) (South Africa)	Pierre Darmon; Keith Diepraam	7; 9	6; 2	6; 4	4; 6	6; 4
3	(France) (South Africa)	Pierre Barthès / François Jauffret; Keith Diepraam / Frew McMillan	0; 6	6; 2	1; 6	5; 7
4	(France) (South Africa)	Pierre Barthès; Keith Diepraam	2; 6	3; 6	6; 2	6; 4	6; 8
5	(France) (South Africa)	Pierre Darmon; Cliff Drysdale	6; 0	3; 6	1; 6	2; 6

== Final ==
=== Spain vs. South Africa ===
Spain
4
Real Club de Tenis, Barcelona, Spain
30 July–1 August 1965
Clay

South Africa
1

			1	2	3	4	5
1	(Spain) (South Africa)	Manuel Santana; Cliff Drysdale	6; 3	6; 3	6; 2
2	(Spain) (South Africa)	Juan Gisbert; Keith Diepraam	6; 2	6; 1	3; 6	3; 6	6; 2
3	(Spain) (South Africa)	José Luis Arilla / Manuel Santana; Keith Diepraam / Frew McMillan	9; 7	4; 6	6; 3	6; 2
4	(Spain) (South Africa)	Juan Gisbert; Cliff Drysdale	2; 6	6; 4	3; 6	2; 6
5	(Spain) (South Africa)	Manuel Santana; Keith Diepraam	6; 1	6; 3	6; 3
