= 1965 Davis Cup America Zone =

International tennis competition

The America Zone was one of the three regional zones of the 1965 Davis Cup.

5 teams entered the America Zone, with the winner going on to compete in the Inter-Zonal Zone against the winners of the Eastern Zone and Europe Zone. The United States defeated Mexico in the final and progressed to the Inter-Zonal Zone.

== Draw ==
Quarterfinals; 8–10 July
Nassau, Bahamas
New Zealand	4
Caribbean/West Indies	0
Mexico
bye
bye
Canada
bye
United States

Semifinals; 5–7 June; 17–20 July
Mexico City, Mexico (clay)
New Zealand	0
Mexico	5
Bakersfield, CA, United States (hard)
Canada	0
United States	5

Final; 31 July–2 August
Dallas, TX, United States (hard)
Mexico	1
United States	4

== Quarterfinals ==
=== Caribbean/West Indies vs. New Zealand ===
Caribbean/West Indies
0
Nassau, Bahamas
8–10 July 1965

New Zealand
4

			1	2	3	4	5
1	(Cricket West Indies) (New Zealand)	Peter Valdez; Ian Crookenden	2; 6	3; 6	2; 6
2	(Cricket West Indies) (New Zealand)	Richard Russell; Lew Gerrard	2; 6	3; 6	1; 6
3	(Cricket West Indies) (New Zealand)	Alan Price / Richard Russell; Ian Crookenden / Lew Gerrard	3; 6	4; 6	6; 3	1; 6
4	(Cricket West Indies) (New Zealand)	Richard Russell; Ian Crookenden	6; 3	6; 8	2; 6	6; 3	2; 6
5	(Cricket West Indies) (New Zealand)	Peter Valdez; Lew Gerrard						not played

== Semifinals ==
=== Mexico vs. New Zealand ===
Mexico
5
Centro Deportivo Chapultepec, Mexico City, Mexico
17–20 July 1965
Clay

New Zealand
0

			1	2	3	4	5
1	(Mexico) (New Zealand)	Rafael Osuna; Lew Gerrard	6; 2	6; 3	6; 3
2	(Mexico) (New Zealand)	Antonio Palafox; Ian Crookenden	3; 6	6; 2	6; 1	6; 1
3	(Mexico) (New Zealand)	Rafael Osuna / Antonio Palafox; Ian Crookenden / Lew Gerrard	6; 4	6; 4	6; 2
4	(Mexico) (New Zealand)	Rafael Osuna; Ian Crookenden	1; 6	6; 2	7; 9	6; 4	6; 2
5	(Mexico) (New Zealand)	Antonio Palafox; Lew Gerrard	6; 2	3; 6	8; 6	6; 3

=== United States vs. Canada ===
United States
5
Bakersfield Racquet Club, Bakersfield, CA, United States
5–7 June 1965
Hard

Canada
0

			1	2	3	4	5
1	(United States) (Canada)	Gene Scott; Henry Fauquier	6; 3	6; 2	4; 6	6; 4
2	(United States) (Canada)	Arthur Ashe; Keith Carpenter	6; 3	6; 3	6; 1
3	(United States) (Canada)	Chuck McKinley / Marty Riessen; Keith Carpenter / Henry Fauquier	9; 7	6; 2	6; 3
4	(United States) (Canada)	Gene Scott; Keith Carpenter	6; 3	7; 5	7; 5
5	(United States) (Canada)	Arthur Ashe; Henry Fauquier	6; 4	6; 0	6; 4

== Final ==
=== United States vs. Mexico ===
United States
4
Samuell Grand Park, Dallas, TX, United States
31 July–2 August 1965
Hard

Mexico
1

			1	2	3	4	5
1	(United States) (Mexico)	Arthur Ashe; Rafael Osuna	6; 2	6; 3	9; 7
2	(United States) (Mexico)	Dennis Ralston; Antonio Palafox	6; 2	6; 3	6; 2
3	(United States) (Mexico)	Dennis Ralston / Ham Richardson; Rafael Osuna / Antonio Palafox	6; 8	4; 6	5; 7
4	(United States) (Mexico)	Arthur Ashe; Antonio Palafox	6; 1	6; 4	6; 4
5	(United States) (Mexico)	Dennis Ralston; Rafael Osuna	6; 0	6; 2	6; 4
