= Eduardo Álvarez =

Eduardo Álvarez may refer to:

- Eduardo Álvarez (tennis) (born 1950), Venezuelan tennis player
- Eduardo Álvarez Aznar (born 1984), Spanish equestrian
- Eddy Alvarez (born 1990), American baseball infielder
- Eduardo Alvarez (Oz), fictional character
