= 1966 Davis Cup Europe Zone =

International tennis competition

The Europe Zone was one of the three regional zones of the 1966 Davis Cup.

32 teams entered the Europe Zone in total. For this year's tournament the Europe Zone was split into two sub-zones, with the winners of each sub-zone going on to compete in the Inter-Zonal Zone against the winners of the America Zone and Eastern Zone.

Brazil defeated France in the Zone A final, and West Germany defeated South Africa in the Zone B final, resulting in both Brazil and West Germany progressing to the Inter-Zonal Zone.

== Zone A ==
=== Draw ===
First Round; 29 April–2 May
Paris, France (clay)
France	4
Romania	1
Helsinki, Finland (clay)
Finland	1
Canada	4
Bratislava, Czechoslovakia (clay)
Czechoslovakia	5
Austria	0
Lisbon, Portugal (clay)
Portugal	2
Israel	3
Szczecin, Poland (clay)
Poland	3
Sweden	2
Istanbul, Turkey
Turkey	0
Egypt	5
Barcelona, Spain (clay)
Spain	4
Yugoslavia	1
Copenhagen, Denmark (clay)
Denmark	0
Brazil	5

Quarterfinals; 13–17 May
Paris, France (clay)
France	5
Canada	0
Prague, Czechoslovakia (clay)
Czechoslovakia	5
Israel	0
Warsaw, Poland
Poland	4
Egypt	1
Barcelona, Spain (clay)
Spain	2
Brazil	3

Semifinals; 10–12 June
Paris, France (clay)
France	4
Czechoslovakia	1
Warsaw, Poland
Poland	1
Brazil	4

Final; 15–17 July
Paris, France (clay)
France	1
Brazil	4

=== First round ===
==== France vs. Romania ====
France
4
Stade Roland Garros, Paris, France
29 April–1 May 1966
Clay

Romania
1

			1	2	3	4	5
1	(France) (Romania)	François Jauffret; Ion Țiriac	6; 4	6; 4	6; 1
2	(France) (Romania)	Pierre Darmon; Ilie Năstase	6; 1	6; 2	6; 2
3	(France) (Romania)	Patrice Beust / Daniel Contet; Ilie Năstase / Ion Țiriac	6; 4	2; 6	3; 6	6; 0	6; 2
4	(France) (Romania)	Pierre Darmon; Ion Țiriac	6; 3	0; 6	3; 6	3; 6
5	(France) (Romania)	François Jauffret; Ilie Năstase	6; 1	6; 3	8; 6

==== Finland vs. Canada ====
Finland
1
Helsinki, Finland
29 April–1 May 1966
Clay

Canada
4

			1	2	3	4	5
1	(Finland) (Canada)	Pekka Säilä; Henry Fauquier	6; 3	6; 8	3; 6	0; 6
2	(Finland) (Canada)	Rauno Suominen; Mike Belkin	1; 6	3; 6	6; 1	3; 6
3	(Finland) (Canada)	Pekka Säilä / Rauno Suominen; Keith Carpenter / Henry Fauquier	7; 9	8; 6	0; 6	4; 6
4	(Finland) (Canada)	Rauno Suominen; Robert Puddicombe	3; 6	6; 3	8; 6	6; 1
5	(Finland) (Canada)	Pekka Säilä; Mike Belkin	3; 6	0; 6	4; 6

==== Czechoslovakia vs. Austria ====
Czechoslovakia
5
Bratislava, Czechoslovakia
29 April–1 May 1966
Clay

Austria
0

			1	2	3	4	5
1	(Czechoslovakia) (Austria)	Jan Kodeš; Ernst Blanke	4; 6	3; 6	6; 4	6; 4	6; 2
2	(Czechoslovakia) (Austria)	Jiří Javorský; Peter Pokorny	6; 3	3; 6	6; 4	6; 4
3	(Czechoslovakia) (Austria)	Jiří Javorský / Jan Kodeš; Ernst Blanke / Peter Pokorny	1; 6	6; 1	4; 6	6; 2	6; 4
4	(Czechoslovakia) (Austria)	Jan Kodeš; Peter Pokorny	2; 6	6; 4	8; 6	6; 3
5	(Czechoslovakia) (Austria)	Jiří Javorský; Ernst Blanke	6; 1	6; 0	6; 3

==== Portugal vs. Israel ====
Portugal
2
Estádio Nacional, Lisbon, Portugal
29 April–1 May 1966
Clay

Israel
3

			1	2	3	4	5
1	(Portugal) (Israel)	Alfredo Vaz Pinto; Eleazar Davidman	1; 6	7; 5	6; 2	0; 6	4; 6
2	(Portugal) (Israel)	João Lagos; Yehoshua Shalem	6; 4	6; 2	6; 1
3	(Portugal) (Israel)	João Lagos / João Roquette; Eleazar Davidman / Josef Stabholz	3; 6	6; 3	6; 2	3; 6	5; 7
4	(Portugal) (Israel)	Alfredo Vaz Pinto; Yehoshua Shalem	6; 0	6; 1	6; 1
5	(Portugal) (Israel)	João Lagos; Eleazar Davidman	5; 7	3; 6	3; 6

==== Poland vs. Sweden ====
Poland
3
Szczecin, Poland
29 April–1 May 1966
Clay

Sweden
2

			1	2	3	4	5
1	(Poland) (Sweden)	Piotr Jamroz; Christer Holm	12; 10	6; 4	6; 4
2	(Poland) (Sweden)	Wiesław Gąsiorek; Bo Holmström	10; 8	6; 3	6; 0
3	(Poland) (Sweden)	Wiesław Gąsiorek / Wiesław Nowicki; Bo Holmström / Lars Ölander	7; 9	6; 4	6; 2	9; 7
4	(Poland) (Sweden)	Piotr Jamroz; Bo Holmström	1; 6	0; 6	1; 6
5	(Poland) (Sweden)	Wiesław Gąsiorek; Christer Holm	3; 6	3; 6	0; 6

==== Turkey vs. Egypt ====
Turkey
0
Istanbul, Turkey
29 April–1 May 1966

Egypt
5

			1	2	3	4	5
1	(Turkey) (Egypt)	Suzan Gürel; Moataz El Sonbol	6; 3	1; 6	1; 6	5; 7
2	(Turkey) (Egypt)	Tahsin Gürsoy; Fathi Mohammed-Ali	1; 6	2; 6	1; 6
3	(Turkey) (Egypt)	Demir Ataş / Tahsin Gürsoy; Fathi Mohammed-Ali / Shukry Moubarek	1; 6	2; 6	3; 6
4	(Turkey) (Egypt)	Demir Ataş; Moataz El Sonbol	1; 6	1; 6	2; 6
5	(Turkey) (Egypt)	Enis Berki; Fathi Mohammed-Ali	1; 6	2; 6	0; 6

==== Spain vs. Yugoslavia ====
Spain
4
Real Club de Tenis, Barcelona, Spain
29 April–1 May 1966
Clay

Yugoslavia
1

			1	2	3	4	5
1	(Spain) (Socialist Federal Republic of Yugoslavia)	Juan Gisbert; Nikola Pilić	4; 6	3; 6	6; 1	5; 7
2	(Spain) (Socialist Federal Republic of Yugoslavia)	Manuel Santana; Boro Jovanović	6; 3	6; 3	6; 3
3	(Spain) (Socialist Federal Republic of Yugoslavia)	José Luis Arilla / Manuel Santana; Boro Jovanović / Nikola Pilić	4; 6	6; 2	7; 5	6; 4
4	(Spain) (Socialist Federal Republic of Yugoslavia)	Juan Gisbert; Boro Jovanović	6; 0	6; 4	6; 3
5	(Spain) (Socialist Federal Republic of Yugoslavia)	Manuel Santana; Nikola Pilić	6; 1	6; 3	1; 6	6; 2

==== Denmark vs. Brazil ====
Denmark
0
Copenhagen, Denmark
30 April–2 May 1966
Clay

Brazil
5

			1	2	3	4	5
1	(Denmark) (Brazil)	Torben Ulrich; José Edison Mandarino	4; 6	1; 6	1; 6
2	(Denmark) (Brazil)	Jan Leschly; Thomaz Koch	6; 8	3; 6	0; 6
3	(Denmark) (Brazil)	Jan Leschly / Torben Ulrich; Thomaz Koch / José Edison Mandarino	6; 4	1; 6	3; 6	3; 6
4	(Denmark) (Brazil)	Jan Leschly; José Edison Mandarino	2; 6	4; 6	6; 8
5	(Denmark) (Brazil)	Carl-Edvard Hedelund; Luis Felipe Tavares	6; 8	2; 6	4; 6

=== Quarterfinals ===
==== France vs. Canada ====
France
5
Stade Roland Garros, Paris, France
13–15 May 1966
Clay

Canada
0

			1	2	3	4	5
1	(France) (Canada)	François Jauffret; Mike Belkin	6; 1	4; 6	6; 3	6; 4
2	(France) (Canada)	Pierre Darmon; Henry Fauquier	6; 4	6; 2	6; 3
3	(France) (Canada)	Patrice Beust / Daniel Contet; Keith Carpenter / Henry Fauquier	6; 4	9; 7	6; 3
4	(France) (Canada)	François Jauffret; Henry Fauquier	6; 2	6; 2	1; 6	0; 6	6; 0
5	(France) (Canada)	Pierre Darmon; Mike Belkin	6; 8	1; 6	7; 5	6; 0	6; 1

==== Czechoslovakia vs. Israel ====
Czechoslovakia
5
Prague, Czechoslovakia
13–15 May 1966
Clay

Israel
0

			1	2	3	4	5
1	(Czechoslovakia) (Israel)	Jan Kodeš; Josef Stabholz	6; 1	6; 1	6; 3
2	(Czechoslovakia) (Israel)	Jiří Javorský; Yehoshua Shalem	6; 0	6; 0	6; 0
3	(Czechoslovakia) (Israel)	Jiří Javorský / Jan Kodeš; Yehoshua Shalem / Josef Stabholz	6; 1	6; 1	6; 2
4	(Czechoslovakia) (Israel)	František Pála; Josef Stabholz	6; 2	6; 0	6; 2
5	(Czechoslovakia) (Israel)	Jan Kodeš; Yehoshua Shalem	6; 3	7; 5	6; 0

==== Poland vs. Egypt ====
Poland
4
Warsaw, Poland
13–15 May 1966
Clay

Egypt
1

			1	2	3	4	5
1	(Poland) (Egypt)	Wiesław Gąsiorek; Moataz El Sonbol	8; 6	7; 5	6; 0
2	(Poland) (Egypt)	Piotr Jamroz; Fathi Mohammed-Ali	6; 4	3; 6	0; 6	3; 6
3	(Poland) (Egypt)	Wiesław Gąsiorek / Tadeusz Nowicki; Moataz El Sonbol / Fathi Mohammed-Ali	6; 3	6; 2	8; 6
4	(Poland) (Egypt)	Piotr Jamroz; Moataz El Sonbol	6; 4	6; 4	6; 8	6; 3
5	(Poland) (Egypt)	Wiesław Gąsiorek; Fathi Mohammed-Ali	6; 4	6; 1	6; 2

==== Spain vs. Brazil ====
Spain
2
Real Club de Tenis, Barcelona, Spain
14–17 May 1966
Clay

Brazil
3

			1	2	3	4	5
1	(Spain) (Brazil)	Juan Gisbert; Thomaz Koch	3; 6	6; 4	6; 1	6; 4
2	(Spain) (Brazil)	Manuel Santana; José Edison Mandarino	7; 5	7; 5	6; 4
3	(Spain) (Brazil)	José Luis Arilla / Juan Gisbert; Thomaz Koch / José Edison Mandarino	6; 3	2; 6	5; 7	7; 5	4; 6
4	(Spain) (Brazil)	Manuel Santana; Thomaz Koch	5; 7	2; 6	1; 6
5	(Spain) (Brazil)	Juan Gisbert; José Edison Mandarino	5; 7	6; 3	11; 9	6; 8	6; 8

=== Semifinals ===
==== France vs. Czechoslovakia ====
France
4
Stade Roland Garros, Paris, France
10–12 June 1966
Clay

Czechoslovakia
1

			1	2	3	4	5
1	(France) (Czechoslovakia)	François Jauffret; Jiří Javorský	14; 12	1; 6	6; 2	6; 1
2	(France) (Czechoslovakia)	Pierre Darmon; Jan Kodeš	4; 6	6; 4	6; 0	10; 8
3	(France) (Czechoslovakia)	Patrice Beust / Daniel Contet; Jiří Javorský / Jan Kodeš	10; 8	7; 5	3; 6	4; 6	2; 6
4	(France) (Czechoslovakia)	François Jauffret; Jan Kodeš	3; 6	1; 6	6; 3	6; 4	6; 4
5	(France) (Czechoslovakia)	Pierre Darmon; Jiří Javorský	6; 2	6; 4	6; 0

==== Poland vs. Brazil ====
Poland
1
Warsaw, Poland
10–12 June 1966

Brazil
4

			1	2	3	4	5
1	(Poland) (Brazil)	Tadeusz Nowicki; José Edison Mandarino	2; 6	2; 6	3; 6
2	(Poland) (Brazil)	Wiesław Gąsiorek; Thomaz Koch	9; 7	6; 1	7; 5
3	(Poland) (Brazil)	Wiesław Gąsiorek / Tadeusz Nowicki; Thomaz Koch / José Edison Mandarino	1; 6	8; 10	5; 7
4	(Poland) (Brazil)	Tadeusz Nowicki; Thomaz Koch	3; 6	4; 6	1; 6
5	(Poland) (Brazil)	Wiesław Gąsiorek; José Edison Mandarino	2; 6	1; 6	2; 6

=== Final ===
==== France vs. Brazil ====
France
1
Stade Roland Garros, Paris, France
15–17 July 1966
Clay

Brazil
4

			1	2	3	4	5
1	(France) (Brazil)	Pierre Darmon; José Edison Mandarino	6; 3	3; 6	2; 6	1; 6
2	(France) (Brazil)	François Jauffret; Thomaz Koch	6; 2	1; 6	3; 6	2; 6
3	(France) (Brazil)	Patrice Beust / Daniel Contet; Thomaz Koch / José Edison Mandarino	6; 3	4; 6	7; 5	3; 6	4; 6
4	(France) (Brazil)	François Jauffret; José Edison Mandarino	4; 6	1; 6	7; 5	2; 6
5	(France) (Brazil)	Pierre Darmon; Thomaz Koch	6; 4	9; 7	6; 2

== Zone B ==
=== Draw ===
First Round; 22 April–2 May
Mondorf-les-Bains, Luxembourg
Luxembourg	0
Switzerland	5
Freiburg, West Germany (clay)
West Germany	5
Norway	0
Budapest, Hungary
Hungary	4
Greece	1
London, England (clay)
Great Britain	4
New Zealand	1
Bologna, Italy (clay)
Italy	4
Soviet Union	1
Monte Carlo, Monaco
Monaco	1
Morocco	4
Scheveningen, Netherlands (clay)
Netherlands	5
Ireland	0
Brussels, Belgium
Belgium	0
South Africa	5

Quarterfinals; 13–16 May
Lugano, Switzerland
Switzerland	1
West Germany	4
Budapest, Hungary (clay)
Hungary	2
Great Britain	3
Italy	w/o
Morocco
Scheveningen, Netherlands (clay)
Netherlands	1
South Africa	4

Semifinals; 10–12 June
Hanover, West Germany (clay)
West Germany	3
Great Britain	2
Rome, Italy (clay)
Italy	2
South Africa	3

Final; 15–18 July
Munich, West Germany
West Germany	3
South Africa	2

=== First round ===
==== Luxembourg vs. Switzerland ====
Luxembourg
0
Mondorf-les-Bains, Luxembourg
30 April–2 May 1966

Switzerland
5

			1	2	3	4	5
1	(Luxembourg) (Switzerland)	Thierry Brasseur; Dimitri Sturdza	0; 6	1; 6	3; 6
2	(Luxembourg) (Switzerland)	Jean Neuman; Theodor Stalder	5; 7	6; 0	4; 6	1; 6
3	(Luxembourg) (Switzerland)	Frank Baden / Thierry Brasseur; Dimitri Sturdza / Matthias Werren	3; 6	3; 6	3; 6
4	(Luxembourg) (Switzerland)	Thierry Brasseur; Theodor Stalder	1; 6	3; 6	2; 6
5	(Luxembourg) (Switzerland)	Jean Neuman; Dimitri Sturdza	1; 6	4; 6	4; 6

==== West Germany vs. Norway ====
West Germany
5
Freiburg, West Germany
29 April–1 May 1966
Clay

Norway
0

			1	2	3	4	5
1	(West Germany) (Norway)	Wilhelm Bungert; Gunnar Høst Sjøwall	4; 6	6; 0	6; 3	4; 6	6; 2
2	(West Germany) (Norway)	Ingo Buding; Nils Elvik	6; 1	6; 1	6; 0
3	(West Germany) (Norway)	Ingo Buding / Harald Elschenbroich; Nils Elvik / Finn-Dag Jagge	6; 2	7; 5	6; 0
4	(West Germany) (Norway)	Wilhelm Bungert; Nils Elvik	6; 2	6; 1	6; 1
5	(West Germany) (Norway)	Ingo Buding; Gunnar Høst Sjøwall	6; 0	6; 3	6; 0

==== Hungary vs. Greece ====
Hungary
4
Budapest, Hungary
29 April–1 May 1966

Greece
1

			1	2	3	4	5
1	(Hungary) (Greece)	András Szikszay; Nicholas Kalogeropoulos	6; 2	1; 6	6; 3	2; 6	2; 6
2	(Hungary) (Greece)	István Gulyás; Nikolaos Kalyvas	6; 1	6; 2	6; 0
3	(Hungary) (Greece)	István Gulyás / András Szikszay; Periclis Gavrilidis / Nicholas Kalogeropoulos	6; 4	5; 7	6; 4	6; 4
4	(Hungary) (Greece)	István Gulyás; Nicholas Kalogeropoulos	3; 6	9; 7	6; 3	9; 7
5	(Hungary) (Greece)	András Szikszay; Nikolaos Kalyvas	6; 1	6; 0	6; 2

==== Great Britain vs. New Zealand ====
Great Britain
4
Queen's Club, London, England
28–30 April 1966
Clay

New Zealand
1

			1	2	3	4	5
1	(United Kingdom) (New Zealand)	Roger Taylor; Brian Fairlie	7; 5	8; 6	6; 2
2	(United Kingdom) (New Zealand)	Mike Sangster; Lew Gerrard	6; 4	6; 2	6; 2
3	(United Kingdom) (New Zealand)	Mike Sangster / Bobby Wilson; Brian Fairlie / Lew Gerrard	6; 1	6; 0	6; 4
4	(United Kingdom) (New Zealand)	Mike Sangster; Brian Fairlie	3; 6	7; 5	2; 6			retired
5	(United Kingdom) (New Zealand)	Roger Taylor; Lew Gerrard	6; 2	6; 3	2; 6	6; 1

==== Italy vs. Soviet Union ====
Italy
4
Bologna, Italy
28–30 April 1966
Clay

Soviet Union
1

			1	2	3	4	5
1	(Italy) (Soviet Union)	Nicola Pietrangeli; Toomas Leius	6; 1	6; 3	6; 1
2	(Italy) (Soviet Union)	Sergio Tacchini; Alexander Ivanov	5; 7	6; 4	6; 4	6; 2
3	(Italy) (Soviet Union)	Giordano Maioli / Gaetano Di Maso; Toomas Leius / Sergei Likhachev	5; 7	0; 6	3; 6
4	(Italy) (Soviet Union)	Sergio Tacchini; Toomas Leius	6; 1	6; 3	6; 2
5	(Italy) (Soviet Union)	Nicola Pietrangeli; Alexander Ivanov	6; 3	6; 1	6; 4

==== Monaco vs. Morocco ====
Monaco
1
Monte Carlo, Monaco
22–24 April 1966

Morocco
4

			1	2	3	4	5
1	(Monaco) (Morocco)	Patrick Landau; Mohammed-Haibabi Bouchaib	2; 6	3; 6	3; 6
2	(Monaco) (Morocco)	Adrien Viviani; Lahcen Chadli	2; 6	0; 6	2; 6
3	(Monaco) (Morocco)	Patrick Landau / Francis Truchi; Ahmed Ben Ali / Ali Laroussi	6; 2	6; 3	6; 4
4	(Monaco) (Morocco)	Patrick Landau; Lahcen Chadli	4; 6	6; 8	1; 6
5	(Monaco) (Morocco)	Adrien Viviani; Mohammed-Haibabi Bouchaib	5; 7	2; 6	2; 6

==== Netherlands vs. Ireland ====
Netherlands
5
Scheveningen, Netherlands
29 April–1 May 1966
Clay

Ireland
0

			1	2	3	4	5
1	(Netherlands) (Republic of Ireland)	Tom Okker; Peter Jackson	6; 0	6; 4	6; 1
2	(Netherlands) (Republic of Ireland)	Jan Hajer; Michael Hickey	6; 2	6; 1	6; 1
3	(Netherlands) (Republic of Ireland)	Pieter van Eijsden / Tom Okker; Derek Arthurs / Peter Jackson	6; 3	6; 2	6; 3
4	(Netherlands) (Republic of Ireland)	Tom Okker; Michael Hickey	6; 3	6; 4	6; 2
5	(Netherlands) (Republic of Ireland)	Jan Hajer; Peter Jackson	6; 0	6; 1	6; 0

==== Belgium vs. South Africa ====
Belgium
0
Brussels, Belgium
29 April–1 May 1966

South Africa
5

			1	2	3	4	5
1	(Belgium) (South Africa)	Patrick Hombergen; Cliff Drysdale	4; 6	1; 6	4; 6
2	(Belgium) (South Africa)	Eric Drossart; Keith Diepraam	6; 2	2; 6	6; 2	6; 8	3; 6
3	(Belgium) (South Africa)	Claude De Gronckel / Patrick Hombergen; Keith Diepraam / Frew McMillan	1; 6	6; 8	5; 7
4	(Belgium) (South Africa)	Patrick Hombergen; Keith Diepraam	12; 10	4; 6	6; 4	1; 6	3; 6
5	(Belgium) (South Africa)	Claude De Gronckel; Cliff Drysdale	0; 6	2; 6	3; 6

=== Quarterfinals ===
==== Switzerland vs. West Germany ====
Switzerland
1
Lugano, Switzerland
13–15 May 1966

West Germany
4

			1	2	3	4	5
1	(Switzerland) (West Germany)	Dimitri Sturdza; Ingo Buding	2; 6	3; 6	1; 6
2	(Switzerland) (West Germany)	Theodor Stalder; Wilhelm Bungert	2; 6	2; 6	1; 6
3	(Switzerland) (West Germany)	Dimitri Sturdza / Matthias Werren; Ingo Buding / Harald Elschenbroich	2; 6	6; 3	3; 6	8; 10
4	(Switzerland) (West Germany)	Dimitri Sturdza; Wilhelm Bungert	4; 6	6; 3	2; 6	7; 5	6; 4
5	(Switzerland) (West Germany)	Theodor Stalder; Ingo Buding	2; 6	2; 6	2; 6

==== Hungary vs. Great Britain ====
Hungary
2
Budapest, Hungary
14–16 May 1966
Clay

Great Britain
3

			1	2	3	4	5
1	(Hungary) (United Kingdom)	István Gulyás; Mike Sangster	4; 6	6; 3	6; 4	2; 6	7; 5
2	(Hungary) (United Kingdom)	András Szikszay; Roger Taylor	4; 6	2; 6	6; 2	2; 6
3	(Hungary) (United Kingdom)	István Gulyás / András Szikszay; Mike Sangster / Bobby Wilson	2; 6	4; 6	13; 11	4; 6
4	(Hungary) (United Kingdom)	András Szikszay; Mike Sangster	6; 1	6; 2	3; 6	6; 3
5	(Hungary) (United Kingdom)	István Gulyás; Roger Taylor	18; 16	3; 6	1; 6	4; 6

==== Netherlands vs. South Africa ====
Netherlands
1
Scheveningen, Netherlands
13–15 May 1966
Clay

South Africa
4

			1	2	3	4	5
1	(Netherlands) (South Africa)	Jan Hajer; Keith Diepraam	6; 4	2; 6	0; 6	4; 6
2	(Netherlands) (South Africa)	Tom Okker; Cliff Drysdale	3; 6	4; 6	6; 4	2; 6
3	(Netherlands) (South Africa)	Jan Hajer / Tom Okker; Keith Diepraam / Frew McMillan	5; 7	6; 8	1; 6
4	(Netherlands) (South Africa)	Tom Okker; Keith Diepraam	6; 3	6; 2	8; 6
5	(Netherlands) (South Africa)	Jan Hajer; Cliff Drysdale	2; 6	1; 6	0; 6

=== Semifinals ===
==== West Germany vs. Great Britain ====
West Germany
3
Hanover, West Germany
10–12 June 1966
Clay

Great Britain
2

			1	2	3	4	5
1	(West Germany) (United Kingdom)	Ingo Buding; Mike Sangster	6; 1	6; 4	3; 6	6; 3
2	(West Germany) (United Kingdom)	Wilhelm Bungert; Roger Taylor	6; 1	2; 6	13; 11	6; 4
3	(West Germany) (United Kingdom)	Ingo Buding / Wilhelm Bungert; Mike Sangster / Bobby Wilson	6; 0	8; 10	1; 6	5; 7
4	(West Germany) (United Kingdom)	Wilhelm Bungert; Mike Sangster	6; 3	6; 3	12; 10
5	(West Germany) (United Kingdom)	Ingo Buding; Roger Taylor	2; 6	6; 3	2; 6	1; 1		retired

==== Italy vs. South Africa ====
Italy
2
Foro Italico, Rome, Italy
10–12 June 1966
Clay

South Africa
3

			1	2	3	4	5
1	(Italy) (South Africa)	Sergio Tacchini; Cliff Drysdale	1; 6	6; 1	6; 4	6; 4
2	(Italy) (South Africa)	Nicola Pietrangeli; Keith Diepraam	6; 2	6; 3	1; 6	6; 3
3	(Italy) (South Africa)	Giordano Maioli / Gaetano Di Maso; Keith Diepraam / Frew McMillan	6; 3	11; 9	3; 6	4; 6	4; 6
4	(Italy) (South Africa)	Nicola Pietrangeli; Cliff Drysdale	3; 6	3; 6	6; 4	6; 2	2; 6
5	(Italy) (South Africa)	Sergio Tacchini; Keith Diepraam	4; 6	5; 7	3; 6

=== Final ===
==== West Germany vs. South Africa ====
West Germany
3
Munich, West Germany
15–18 July 1966

South Africa
2

			1	2	3	4	5
1	(West Germany) (South Africa)	Wilhelm Bungert; Cliff Drysdale	6; 3	0; 6	8; 6	6; 4
2	(West Germany) (South Africa)	Ingo Buding; Keith Diepraam	6; 2	6; 1	1; 6	6; 4
3	(West Germany) (South Africa)	Ingo Buding / Harald Elschenbroich; Keith Diepraam / Frew McMillan	1; 6	7; 5	6; 1	5; 7	5; 7
4	(West Germany) (South Africa)	Wilhelm Bungert; Keith Diepraam	12; 10	6; 2	6; 3
5	(West Germany) (South Africa)	Ingo Buding; Cliff Drysdale	4; 6	9; 7	5; 7	0; 6
