= 1965 Davis Cup Eastern Zone =

International tennis competition

The Eastern Zone was one of the three regional zones of the 1965 Davis Cup.

9 teams entered the Eastern Zone, competing across 2 sub-zones. The winner of each sub-zone would play against each other to determine who would compete in the Inter-Zonal Zone against the winners of the America Zone and Europe Zone.

Japan defeated South Korea in the Zone A final, and India defeated South Vietnam in the Zone B final. In the Inter-Zonal final India defeated Japan and progressed to the Inter-Zonal Zone.

== Zone A ==
=== Draw ===
Semifinals; 23–25 April
Tokyo, Japan
Philippines	0
Japan	5
bye
South Korea

Final; 1–3 May
Seoul, South Korea
Japan	5
South Korea	0

=== Semifinals ===
==== Japan vs. Philippines ====
Japan
5
Tokyo, Japan
23–25 April 1965

Philippines
0

			1	2	3	4	5
1	(Japan) (Philippines)	Ichizō Konishi; Augusto Villanueva	9; 7	6; 2	6; 0
2	(Japan) (Philippines)	Osamu Ishiguro; Samuel Ang	10; 8	6; 2	6; 4
3	(Japan) (Philippines)	Osamu Ishiguro / Koji Watanabe; Samuel Ang / Alfredo Cruz	2; 6	6; 3	3; 6	7; 5	6; 0
4	(Japan) (Philippines)	Ichizō Konishi; Delfin Contreras	6; 0	6; 1	6; 2
5	(Japan) (Philippines)	Koji Watanabe; Augusto Villanueva	8; 6	6; 1	6; 2

=== Final ===
==== South Korea vs. Japan ====
South Korea
0
Seoul, South Korea
1–3 May 1965

Japan
5

			1	2	3	4	5
1	(South Korea) (Japan)	Im Chung-yang; Osamu Ishiguro	1; 6	5; 7	3; 6
2	(South Korea) (Japan)	Chung Yong-ho; Koji Watanabe	0; 6	0; 6	4; 6
3	(South Korea) (Japan)	Chung Yong-ho / Im Chung-yang; Mitsuru Motoi / Koji Watanabe	2; 6	3; 6	4; 6
4	(South Korea) (Japan)	Kim Doo-hwan; Mitsuru Motoi	7; 5	3; 6	3; 6	3; 6
5	(South Korea) (Japan)	Baek Se-hyun; Koji Watanabe	0; 6	0; 6	2; 6

== Zone B ==
=== Draw ===
Quarterfinals; 19 February–1 March
Ceylon
bye
Abadan, Iran
India	5
Iran	0
Kuala Lumpur, Malaysia (grass)
South Vietnam	4
Pakistan	1
bye
Malaysia

Semifinals; 13–29 March
Colombo, Ceylon (clay)
Ceylon	0
India	5
Saigon, South Vietnam
South Vietnam	5
Malaysia	0

Final; 10–12 April
Vijayawada, India
India	4
South Vietnam	0

=== Quarterfinals ===
==== Iran vs. India ====
Iran
0
Abadan, Iran
19–21 February 1965

India
5

			1	2	3	4	5
1	(Iran) (India)	Taghi Akbari; Jaidip Mukerjea	6; 2	3; 6	3; 6	3; 6
2	(Iran) (India)	Nematollah Nemati; Premjit Lall	2; 6	2; 6	2; 6
3	(Iran) (India)	Taghi Akbari / Nematollah Nemati; Premjit Lall / Jaidip Mukerjea	4; 6	1; 6	2; 6
4	(Iran) (India)	Issa Khodaei; Shiv Prakash Misra	0; 6	0; 6	2; 6
5	(Iran) (India)	Taghi Akbari; Premjit Lall	3; 6	0; 6	4; 6

==== Pakistan vs. South Vietnam ====
Pakistan
1
Kuala Lumpur, Malaysia
27 February–1 March 1965
Grass

South Vietnam
4

			1	2	3	4	5
1	(Pakistan) (South Vietnam)	Haroon Rahim; Võ Văn Bảy	3; 6	3; 6	7; 5	7; 5	6; 1
2	(Pakistan) (South Vietnam)	Munawar Iqbal; Lưu Hoàng Đức	5; 7	1; 6	4; 6
3	(Pakistan) (South Vietnam)	Azim Inayat / Haroon Rahim; Lưu Hoàng Đức / Võ Văn Bảy	5; 7	5; 7	1; 6
4	(Pakistan) (South Vietnam)	Munawar Iqbal; Võ Văn Bảy	3; 6	1; 6	3; 6
5	(Pakistan) (South Vietnam)	Haroon Rahim; Lưu Hoàng Đức	2; 6	4; 6	2; 6

=== Semifinals ===
==== Ceylon vs. India ====
Ceylon
0
Ceylon Lawn Tennis Association, Colombo, Ceylon
27–29 March 1965
Clay

India
5

			1	2	3	4	5
1	(Dominion of Ceylon) (India)	Gamini Perera; Jaidip Mukerjea	3; 6	3; 6	3; 6
2	(Dominion of Ceylon) (India)	Bernard Pinto; Premjit Lall	2; 6	2; 6	1; 6
3	(Dominion of Ceylon) (India)	Gamini Perera / Bernard Pinto; Premjit Lall / Jaidip Mukerjea	4; 6	2; 6	2; 6
4	(Dominion of Ceylon) (India)	Bernard Pinto; Ravi Venkatesan	0; 6	6; 2	0; 6	1; 6
5	(Dominion of Ceylon) (India)	Gamini Perera; Shiv Prakash Misra	1; 6	3; 6	4; 6

==== South Vietnam vs. Malaysia ====
South Vietnam
5
Saigon, South Vietnam
13–15 March 1965

Malaysia
0

			1	2	3	4	5
1	(South Vietnam) (Malaysia)	Lưu Hoàng Đức; Sultan-Aman Azman	6; 1	7; 5	6; 2
2	(South Vietnam) (Malaysia)	Võ Văn Bảy; Sharin Osman	6; 2	6; 3	6; 3
3	(South Vietnam) (Malaysia)	Võ Văn Bảy / Võ Văn Thành; Sultan-Aman Azman / Yoke-Yen Kwok	6; 3	6; 2	6; 1
4	(South Vietnam) (Malaysia)	Võ Văn Thành; Sultan-Aman Azman	6; 0	6; 1	6; 0
5	(South Vietnam) (Malaysia)	Lưu Hoàng Đức; Sharin Osman	6; 2	6; 2	6; 1

=== Final ===
==== India vs. South Vietnam ====
India
4
Vijayawada, India
10–12 April 1965

South Vietnam
0

			1	2	3	4	5
1	(India) (South Vietnam)	Premjit Lall; Võ Văn Thành	6; 3	6; 3	6; 1
2	(India) (South Vietnam)	Jaidip Mukerjea; Lưu Hoàng Đức	6; 1	6; 2	6; 0
3	(India) (South Vietnam)	Premjit Lall / Jaidip Mukerjea; Lưu Hoàng Đức / Võ Văn Thành	6; 1	6; 4	3; 6	8; 6
4	(India) (South Vietnam)	Ravi Venkatesan; Lưu Hoàng Đức	6; 2	6; 3	6; 8	6; 3
5	(India) (South Vietnam)	Shiv Prakash Misra; Võ Văn Thành	6; 2	6; 4	0; 1			not completed

== Eastern Inter-Zonal Final ==
=== Japan vs. India ===
Japan
1
Tokyo, Japan
1–3 October 1965

India
4

			1	2	3	4	5
1	(Japan) (India)	Koji Watanabe; Jaidip Mukerjea	0; 6	4; 6	5; 7
2	(Japan) (India)	Osamu Ishiguro; Ramanathan Krishnan	4; 6	4; 6	2; 6
3	(Japan) (India)	Osamu Ishiguro / Koji Watanabe; Ramanathan Krishnan / Jaidip Mukerjea	6; 3	6; 4	2; 6	6; 4
4	(Japan) (India)	Koji Watanabe; Ramanathan Krishnan	6; 8	2; 6	7; 9
5	(Japan) (India)	Osamu Ishiguro; Jaidip Mukerjea	7; 5	7; 5	2; 6	6; 8	4; 6
