= 1966 Davis Cup Eastern Zone =

International tennis competition

The Eastern Zone was one of the three regional zones of the 1966 Davis Cup.

8 teams entered the Eastern Zone, competing across 2 sub-zones. The winner of each sub-zones would play against each other to determine who would compete in the Inter-Zonal Zone against the winners of the America Zone and Europe Zone.

Japan defeated the Philippines in the Zone A final, and India defeated Ceylon in the Zone B final. In the Inter-Zonal final India defeated Japan and progressed to the Inter-Zonal Zone.

== Zone A ==
=== Draw ===
Semifinals; 17–19 April
Seoul, South Korea
Philippines	3
South Korea	2
bye
Japan

Final; 30 April–2 May
Manila, Philippines
Philippines	2
Japan	3

=== Semifinals ===
==== South Korea vs. Philippines ====
South Korea
2
Seoul, South Korea
17–19 April 1966

Philippines
3

			1	2	3	4	5
1	(South Korea) (Philippines)	Kim Doo-hwan; Felicisimo Ampon	6; 3	4; 6	3; 6	1; 6
2	(South Korea) (Philippines)	Im Chung-yang; Raymundo Deyro	6; 2	6; 4	7; 5
3	(South Korea) (Philippines)	Im Chung-yang / Kim Doo-hwan; Samuel Ang / Augusto Villanueva	3; 6	7; 5	2; 6	6; 4	1; 6
4	(South Korea) (Philippines)	Im Chung-yang; Felicisimo Ampon	2; 6	2; 6	3; 6
5	(South Korea) (Philippines)	Kim Doo-hwan; Raymundo Deyro	7; 9	6; 4	6; 3	6; 4

=== Final ===
==== Philippines vs. Japan ====
Philippines
2
Manila, Philippines
30 April–2 May 1966

Japan
3

			1	2	3	4	5
1	(Philippines) (Japan)	Felicisimo Ampon; Koji Watanabe	5; 7	4; 6	3; 6
2	(Philippines) (Japan)	Raymundo Deyro; Osamu Ishiguro	6; 4	1; 6	2; 6	6; 1	6; 1
3	(Philippines) (Japan)	Samuel Ang / Eduardo Cruz; Osamu Ishiguro / Koji Watanabe	1; 6	2; 6	5; 7
4	(Philippines) (Japan)	Raymundo Deyro; Koji Watanabe	2; 6	4; 6	2; 6
5	(Philippines) (Japan)	Felicisimo Ampon; Osamu Ishiguro	6; 4	6; 3	6; 1

== Zone B ==
=== Draw ===
Quarterfinals
Ceylon	w/o
South Vietnam
Malaysia
bye
bye
Iran
bye
India

Semifinals; 19 March–19 April
Kuala Lumpur, Malaysia
Ceylon	4
Malaysia	1
Ahmedabad, India
Iran	0
India	5

Final; 7–9 May
Madras, India
Ceylon	0
India	5

=== Semifinals ===
==== Malaysia vs. Ceylon ====
Malaysia
1
Kuala Lumpur, Malaysia
17–19 April 1966

Ceylon
4

			1	2	3	4	5
1	(Malaysia) (Dominion of Ceylon)	Sultan-Aman Azman; Senaka Kumara	2; 6	2; 6	2; 6
2	(Malaysia) (Dominion of Ceylon)	Billy Yap; Bernard Pinto	3; 6	3; 6	4; 6
3	(Malaysia) (Dominion of Ceylon)	Sultan-Aman Azman / Moses Tay; Senaka Kumara / Bernard Pinto	6; 2	10; 12	3; 6	6; 4	7; 9
4	(Malaysia) (Dominion of Ceylon)	Billy Yap; Senaka Kumara	4; 6	6; 2	1; 6	3; 6
5	(Malaysia) (Dominion of Ceylon)	Sultan-Aman Azman; Gamini Perera	6; 1	2; 6	1; 6	6; 4	6; 1

==== India vs. Iran ====
India
5
Ahmedabad, India
19–21 March 1966

Iran
0

			1	2	3	4	5
1	(India) (Iran)	Shiv Prakash Misra; Taghi Akbari	6; 2	3; 6	6; 3	6; 4
2	(India) (Iran)	Premjit Lall; Nematollah Nemati	6; 2	6; 3	6; 1
3	(India) (Iran)	Premjit Lall / Shiv Prakash Misra; Taghi Akbari / Nematollah Nemati	6; 2	6; 4	6; 4
4	(India) (Iran)	Shiv Prakash Misra; Nematollah Nemati	7; 5	6; 0	6; 0
5	(India) (Iran)	Ravi Venkatesan; Ezzatollah Nemati	6; 1	6; 1	6; 0

=== Final ===
==== India vs. Ceylon ====
India
5
Madras, India
7–9 May 1966

Ceylon
0

			1	2	3	4	5
1	(India) (Dominion of Ceylon)	Premjit Lall; Senaka Kumara	6; 2	6; 4	6; 4
2	(India) (Dominion of Ceylon)	Shiv Prakash Misra; Bernard Pinto	9; 7	6; 2	6; 2
3	(India) (Dominion of Ceylon)	Premjit Lall / Shiv Prakash Misra; Senaka Kumara / Bernard Pinto	6; 3	6; 2	6; 2
4	(India) (Dominion of Ceylon)	Ravi Venkatesan; Gamini Perera	6; 1	4; 6	6; 1	6; 3
5	(India) (Dominion of Ceylon)	Shiv Prakash Misra; Senaka Kumara	6; 4	6; 3	6; 3

== Eastern Inter-Zonal Final ==
=== Japan vs. India ===
Japan
1
Tokyo, Japan
30 September–3 October 1966

India
4

			1	2	3	4	5
1	(Japan) (India)	Osamu Ishiguro; Ramanathan Krishnan	3; 6	6; 2	2; 6	8; 10
2	(Japan) (India)	Koji Watanabe; Premjit Lall	6; 3	4; 6	6; 3	3; 6	9; 7
3	(Japan) (India)	Osamu Ishiguro / Koji Watanabe; Ramanathan Krishnan / Premjit Lall	2; 6	3; 6	3; 6
4	(Japan) (India)	Osamu Ishiguro; Premjit Lall	6; 2	6; 8	5; 7	8; 10
5	(Japan) (India)	Koji Watanabe; Ramanathan Krishnan	2; 6	5; 7	0; 6
