= Lars Ölander =

Swedish tennis player (1942–2020)

- Country (sports): Sweden
- Residence: Stockholm, Sweden
- Born: 29 June 1942; Stockholm, Sweden
- Died: 5 August 2020 (aged 78)
- Plays: Right-handed

Singles
- Career record: 3–7
- Career titles: 0

Grand Slam singles results
- French Open: 2R (1968)
- Wimbledon: 1R (1967)

Doubles
- Career record: 0–3
- Career titles: 0

Grand Slam doubles results
- Wimbledon: 1R (1968)

Mixed doubles

Grand Slam mixed doubles results
- Wimbledon: 2R (1968)

Lars Gösta Ölander (29 June 1942 – 5 August 2020) was a former tennis player from Sweden.

== Career ==
Ölander represented his country in the Davis Cup competition and in the 1965 Europe Zone first-round tie against Poland he played the second singles rubber against Wieslaw Gasiorek, losing in straight sets and in the reverse singles he beat Wieslaw Nowicki in four sets. Sweden won the first-round tie, but lost, 2–3 in the second round, to Czechoslovakia with Ölander playing in both the singles and doubles. In 1966, once again against Poland in the first round, he played the doubles rubber with Bo Holmström, losing in four sets to Gasiorek and Nowicki.

Ölander won the Swedish National Championships in 1967, beating Sven Davidson in the final. He also made his Grand Slam debut in 1967 at the French Championship, losing in the first round to Alex Metreveli. Ölander's last tour match was at the 1971 Stockholm Open where, after receiving a bye in the first round, he lost in the second round to Jan Kodeš.

After his playing career, Ölander continued as an administrator in Swedish tennis and was chairman of the Swedish Tennis Association from 1983 to 1988.

== See also ==
- List of Sweden Davis Cup team representatives
