= Bo Holmström (tennis) =

Swedish tennis player

- Country (sports): Sweden
- Residence: Täby, Sweden
- Born: 15 May 1943 (age 81)
- Retired: 1976
- Plays: Right-handed

Singles
- Career record: 2–8
- Career titles: 0
- Highest ranking: 137 (26 November 1973)

Grand Slam singles results
- Wimbledon: 1R (1965)

Doubles
- Career record: 2–5
- Career titles: 0

Grand Slam doubles results
- Wimbledon: 2R (1966)

Bo Eddie Holmström (born 15 May 1943) is a Swedish former tennis player.

== Career ==
Holmström made his debut for Sweden in the Davis Cup competition during 1964 Europe Zone first-round tie against Greece, losing his singles match against Nicky Kalogeropoulos. In the 1966 first round, against Poland, Holmström played both the singles and the doubles rubbers. In his first singles rubber he lost to Wieslaw Gasiorek while beating Piotr Jamroz in the second. In the doubles he teamed up with Lars Ölander, losing to Gasiorek and Wieslaw Nowicki.

In Grand Slam tennis, Holmström, as a lucky loser, qualified for the 1965 Wimbledon Championships losing in the first round to the Australian, Bob Howe.

== See also ==
- List of Sweden Davis Cup team representatives
