= List of Sweden Davis Cup team representatives =

This is a list of tennis players who have represented the Sweden Davis Cup team in an official Davis Cup match. Sweden have taken part in the competition since 1925.

== Players ==
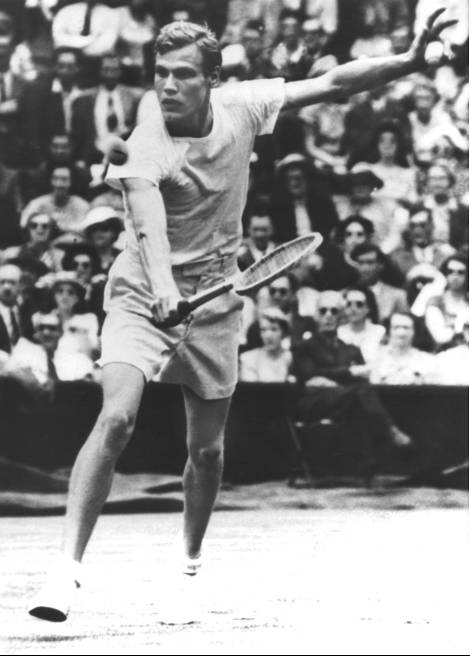
Lennart Bergelin

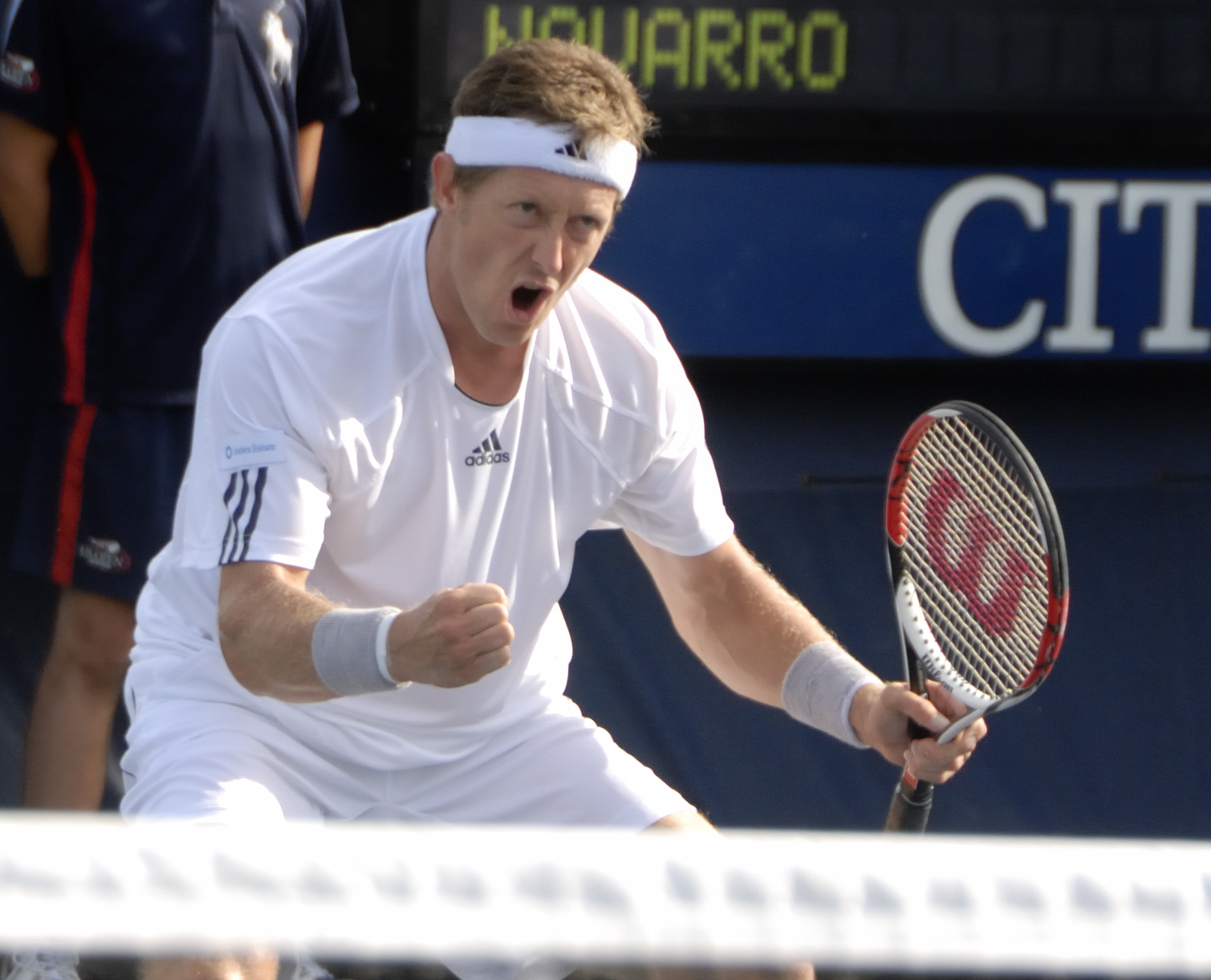
Jonas Björkman

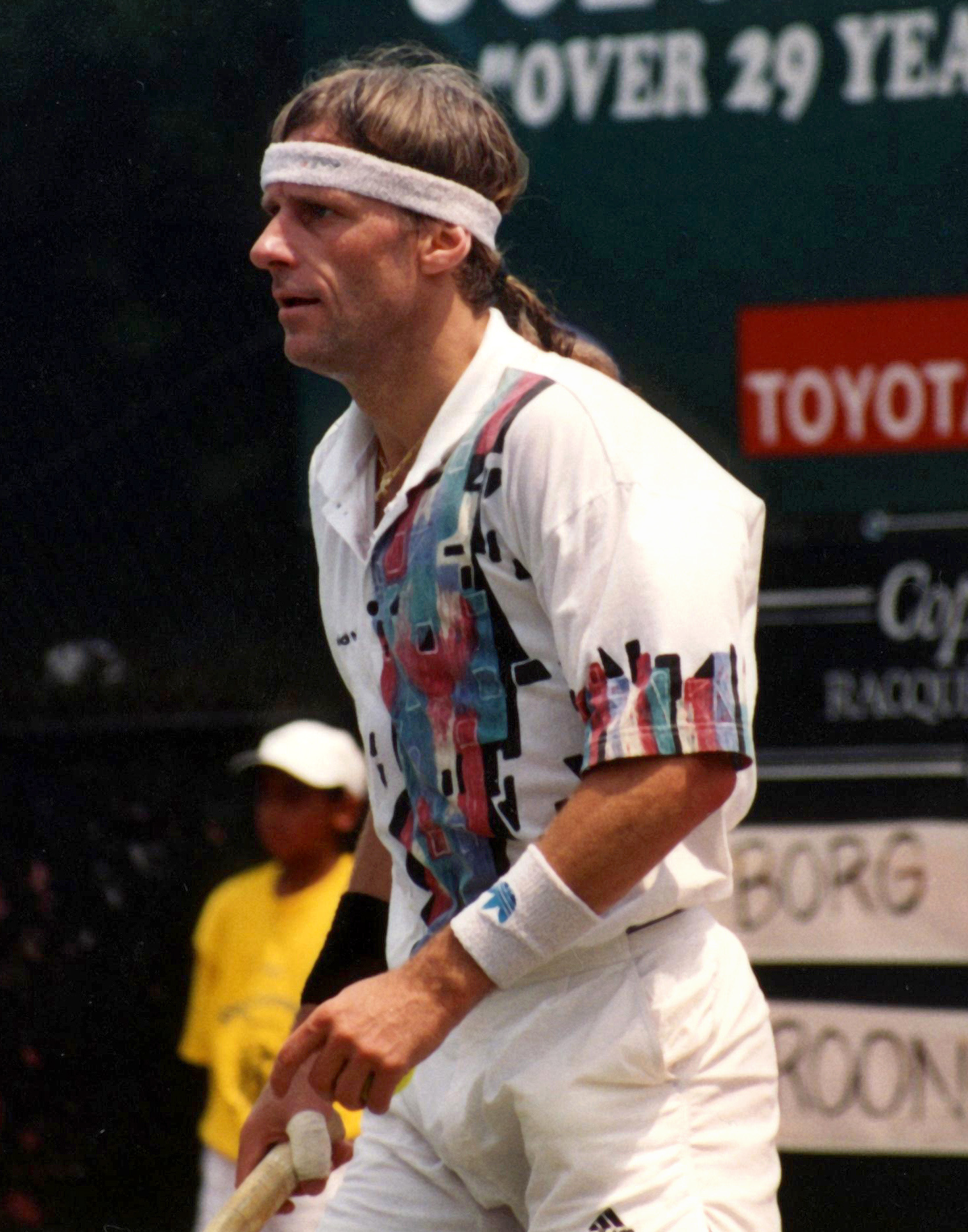
Björn Borg

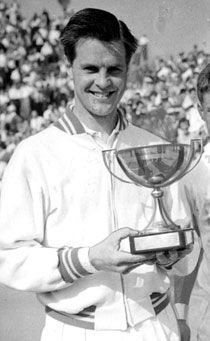
Sven Davidson

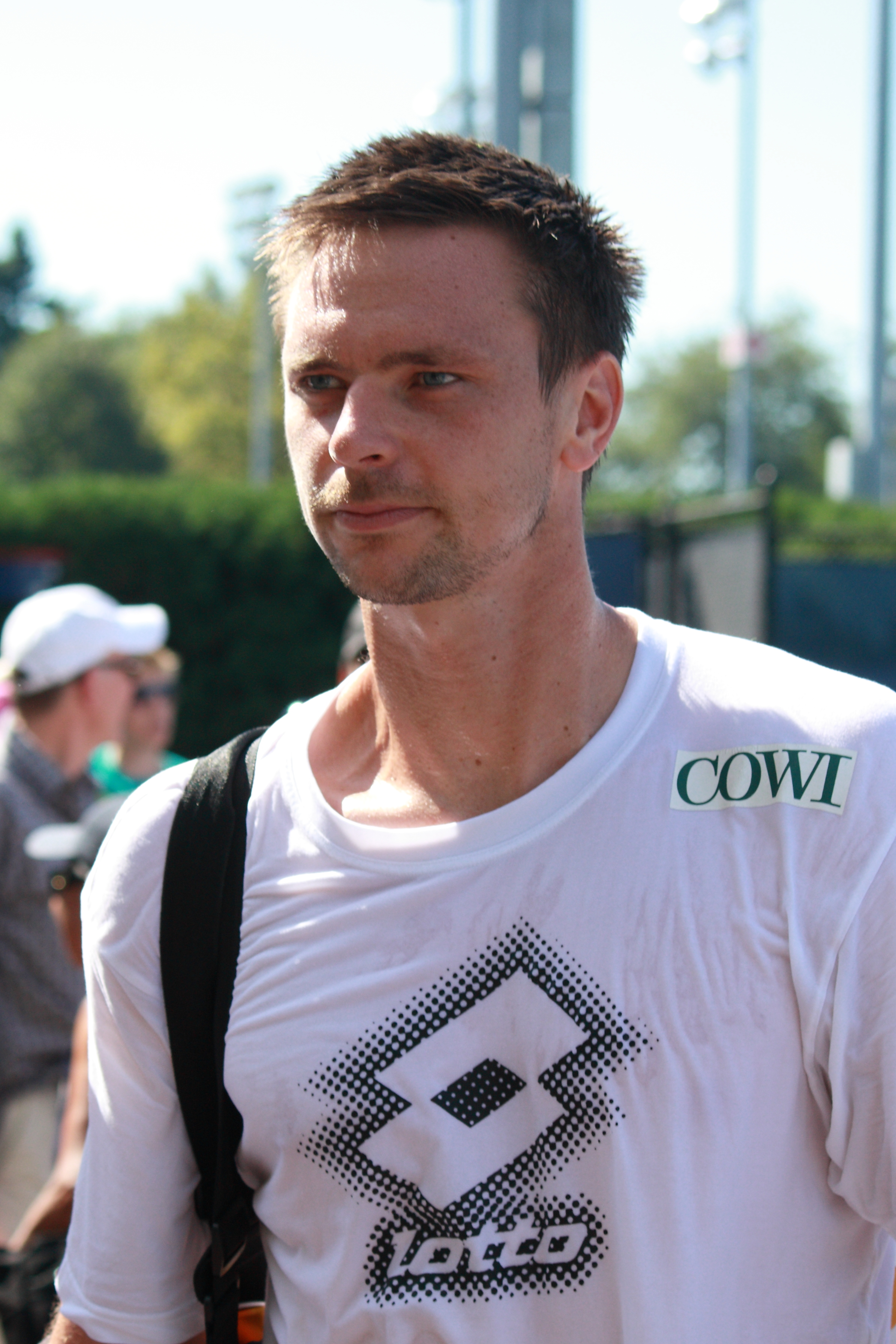
Robin Söderling

As of December 2021

| Player | W-L (Total) | W-L (Singles) | W-L (Doubles) | Ties | Debut |
|---|---|---|---|---|---|
| Birger Andersson | 5–7 | 5–7 | 0–0 | 6 | 1975 |
| Jan Apell | 6–0 | 0–0 | 6–0 | 6 | 1994 |
| Isak Arvidsson | 2–11 | 2–8 | 0–3 | 7 | 2013 |
| Simon Aspelin | 6–8 | 0–2 | 6–6 | 12 | 2001 |
| Bengt Axelsson | 1–0 | 1–0 | 0–0 | 1 | 1956 |
| Ove Bengtson | 22–28 | 7–14 | 15–14 | 29 | 1967 |
| Lennart Bergelin | 62–26 | 43–17 | 19–9 | 36 | 1946 |
| Rikard Bergh | 1–0 | 0–0 | 1–0 | 1 | 1991 |
| Christian Bergström | 4–0 | 3–0 | 1–0 | 2 | 1991 |
| Jonas Björkman | 39–25 | 18–11 | 21–14 | 36 | 1994 |
| Björn Borg | 45–11 | 37–3 | 8–8 | 21 | 1972 |
| Johan Brunström | 9–7 | 0–1 | 9–6 | 15 | 2012 |
| Kent Carlsson | 4–1 | 4–1 | 0–0 | 4 | 1986 |
| Martin Carlstein | 1–0 | 0–0 | 1–0 | 1 | 1969 |
| Sven Davidson | 62–23 | 39–14 | 23–9 | 36 | 1950 |
| Stefan Edberg | 47–23 | 35–15 | 12–8 | 35 | 1984 |
| Ervin Eleskovic | 0–1 | 0–1 | 0–0 | 1 | 2011 |
| Åke Eliaeson | 1–0 | 1–0 | 0–0 | 1 | 1952 |
| Thomas Enqvist | 15–11 | 15–10 | 0–1 | 15 | 1995 |
| Markus Eriksson | 11–12 | 7–9 | 4–3 | 14 | 2012 |
| Borje Fornstedt | 0–1 | 0–1 | 0–0 | 1 | 1948 |
| Ingvar Garell | 2–5 | 1–5 | 1–0 | 3 | 1926 |
| André Göransson | 1–2 | 0–0 | 1–2 | 4 | 2019 |
| Jan Gunnarsson | 2–3 | 0–1 | 2–2 | 5 | 1985 |
| Magnus Gustafsson | 10–4 | 10–4 | 0–0 | 9 | 1991 |
| Thomas Hallberg | 0–2 | 0–1 | 0–1 | 1 | 1961 |
| Per Hjertquist | 3–2 | 3–1 | 0–1 | 4 | 1979 |
| Christer Holm | 1–1 | 1–1 | 0–0 | 1 | 1966 |
| Henrik Holm | 2–4 | 0–3 | 2–1 | 4 | 1993 |
| Bo Holmström | 1–3 | 1–2 | 0–1 | 2 | 1964 |
| Morgan Hultman | 1–3 | 1–3 | 0–0 | 2 | 1939 |
| Anders Järryd | 36–17 | 16–3 | 20–14 | 35 | 1981 |
| Joachim Johansson | 3–5 | 2–5 | 1–0 | 6 | 2003 |
| Leif Johansson | 2–4 | 2–4 | 0–0 | 3 | 1974 |
| Kjell Johansson | 13–11 | 13–11 | 0–0 | 13 | 1973 |
| Torsten Johansson | 51–21 | 33–13 | 18–8 | 32 | 1946 |
| Thomas Johansson | 18–16 | 17–13 | 1–3 | 17 | 1998 |
| Sigurd Karlborg | 0–2 | 0–2 | 0–0 | 1 | 1937 |
| Nicklas Kulti | 19–5 | 5–3 | 14–2 | 19 | 1991 |
| Magnus Larsson | 13–6 | 12–4 | 1–2 | 12 | 1992 |
| Christian Lindell | 4–3 | 4–3 | 0–0 | 4 | 2014 |
| Robert Lindstedt | 16–9 | 0–3 | 16–6 | 24 | 2007 |
| Peter Lundgren | 1–1 | 0–0 | 1–1 | 2 | 1990 |
| Jan-Erik Lundqvist | 64–27 | 47–16 | 17–11 | 35 | 1957 |
| Sune Malmstroem | 8–12 | 7–7 | 1–5 | 7 | 1925 |
| Stig Mårtensson | 0–2 | 0–2 | 0–0 | 1 | 1937 |
| Jonathan Mridha | 1–1 | 1–1 | 0–0 | 1 | 2018 |
| Henning Muller | 0–2 | 0–0 | 0–2 | 2 | 1927 |
| Hans Nerell | 5–7 | 2–5 | 3–2 | 6 | 1968 |
| Jan Norbäck | 2–1 | 1–0 | 1–1 | 2 | 1977 |
| Rolf Norberg | 6–5 | 4–2 | 2–3 | 6 | 1973 |
| Magnus Norman | 7–6 | 7–6 | 0–0 | 7 | 1998 |
| Joakim Nyström | 7–3 | 4–3 | 3–0 | 7 | 1982 |
| Lars Ölander | 1–5 | 1–3 | 0–2 | 3 | 1965 |
| Curt Östberg | 6–11 | 3–7 | 3–4 | 7 | 1929 |
| Douglas Palm | 1–0 | 0–0 | 1–0 | 1 | 1977 |
| Mikael Pernfors | 3–3 | 3–3 | 0–0 | 4 | 1986 |
| Filip Prpic | 0–2 | 0–2 | 0–0 | 1 | 2012 |
| Harry Ramberg | 1–5 | 1–3 | 0–2 | 2 | 1930 |
| Nils Rohlsson | 5–5 | 1–3 | 4–2 | 6 | 1938 |
| Patrik Rosenholm | 1–1 | 1–1 | 0–0 | 1 | 2017 |
| Michael Ryderstedt | 0–6 | 0–5 | 0–1 | 3 | 2011 |
| Ulf Schmidt | 66–36 | 44–25 | 22–11 | 38 | 1955 |
| Karl Schröder | 17–9 | 11–6 | 6–3 | 9 | 1935 |
| Andreas Siljeström | 1–2 | 0–0 | 1–2 | 3 | 2017 |
| Fred Simonsson | 0–2 | 0–0 | 0–2 | 2 | 2015 |
| Hans Simonsson | 6–3 | 0–0 | 6–3 | 9 | 1980 |
| Stefan Simonsson | 2–5 | 2–3 | 0–2 | 3 | 1979 |
| Robin Söderling | 14–4 | 13–3 | 1–1 | 10 | 2004 |
| John Söderström | 0–3 | 0–2 | 0–1 | 1 | 1930 |
| Staffan Stockenberg | 0–2 | 0–2 | 0–0 | 2 | 1953 |
| Henrik Sundström | 8–2 | 8–2 | 0–0 | 5 | 1983 |
| Jonas Svensson | 7–2 | 7–2 | 0–0 | 5 | 1989 |
| Tenny Svensson | 1–2 | 0–1 | 1–1 | 3 | 1978 |
| Mikael Tillström | 7–3 | 2–3 | 5–0 | 5 | 1997 |
| Andreas Vinciguerra | 3–12 | 3–12 | 0–0 | 9 | 2000 |
| Carl-Erik von Braun | 0–3 | 0–2 | 0–1 | 1 | 1925 |
| Marcus Wallenberg | 3–9 | 3–5 | 0–4 | 4 | 1925 |
| Charles Wennergren | 0–1 | 0–0 | 0–1 | 1 | 1928 |
| Mats Wilander | 43–18 | 36–16 | 7–2 | 27 | 1981 |
| Daniel Windahl | 0–2 | 0–2 | 0–0 | 1 | 2016 |
| Elias Ymer | 10–13 | 10–13 | 0–0 | 15 | 2013 |
| Mikael Ymer | 12–6 | 12–6 | 0–0 | 11 | 2015 |
| Håkan Zahr | 0–1 | 0–1 | 0–0 | 1 | 1971 |
