= Christer Holm =

Swedish tennis player

- Country (sports): Sweden
- Residence: Täby, Sweden
- Born: 21 September 1940 (age 84)
- Plays: Right-handed

Singles
- Career record: 2–3
- Career titles: 0

Grand Slam singles results
- Australian Open: 3R (1965)
- Wimbledon: 1R (1960)

Doubles
- Career record: 0–3
- Career titles: 0

Grand Slam doubles results
- Australian Open: 3R (1965)

Mixed doubles

Christer Gunnar Holm (born 21 September 1940) is a former tennis player from Sweden.

== Career ==
Holm represented Sweden in the Davis Cup competition during 1966 Europe Zone first-round tie against Poland. He played both singles rubbers, losing to Piotr Jamroz in the first rubber and beating Wieslaw Gasiorek in the last.

In Grand Slam tennis, Holm qualified for the 1960 Wimbledon Championships losing in the first round. At the 1965 Australian Open he reached the third round before losing to Tony Roche.

Holm is the father of former ATP professional players, Henrik Holm and Nils Holm.

== See also ==
- List of Sweden Davis Cup team representatives
