= Rauno Suominen =

Finnish tennis player and coach (1939–2018)

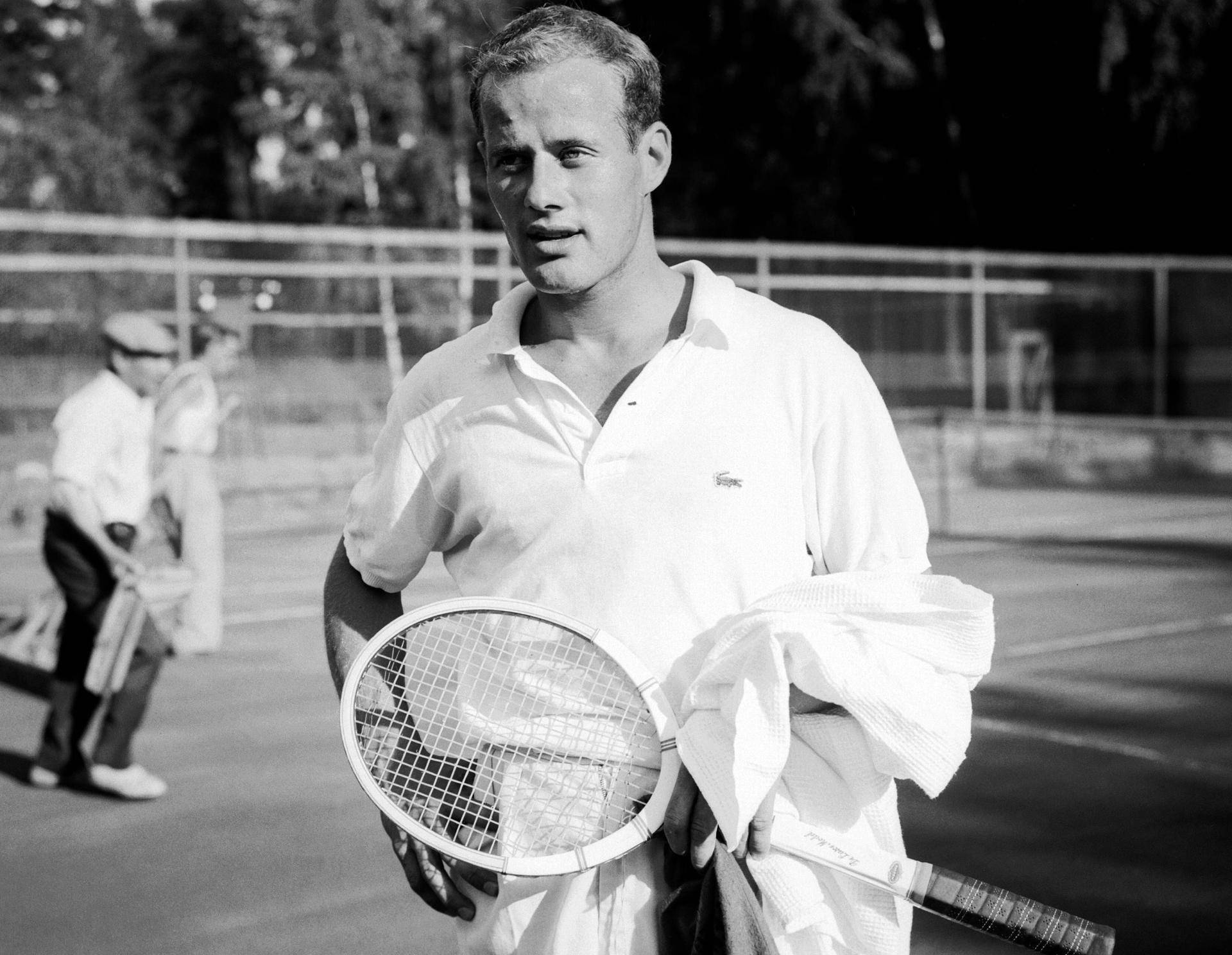
- Rauno Suominen in 1963
- Country (sports): Finland
- Born: 20 April 1939
- Died: 6 July 2018 (aged 79); Melbourne, Australia
- Turned pro: 1965 (amateur tour)
- Retired: 1975
- Plays: Right-handed

Rauno Suominen (20 April 1939 – 6 July 2018) was a Finnish tennis player and coach.

== Career ==
Suominen represented the Finland Davis Cup team in four Davis Cup ties, from 1965 to 1972. His first match was the 1965 Europe Zone first round tie against Austria. During his Davis Cup career, he won one of the five singles match and was on the losing side in all 3 doubles matches that he played.

Suominen served as national coach for the Finland Tennis Association from 1971 to 1972 and 1977 to 1979. He relocated to the United States in 1972 to become Head Professional at the Four Seasons Racquet Club in Williamsville from 1972 to 1976 and again from 1979 to 1980. In 1993, he began working as an independent pro in Salt Lake City. Suominen died of motor neuron disease in 2018.

== See also ==
- List of Finland Davis Cup team representatives
