= Eduardo Álvarez (tennis) =

Venezuelan tennis player (born 1950)

- Country (sports): Venezuela
- Born: 28 August 1950 (age 74); Caracas, Venezuela
Medal record
Central American and Caribbean Games
Bronze medal – third place	1966 San Juan	Mixed doubles

Eduardo Álvarez (born 28 August 1950) is a Venezuelan former tennis player.

Álvarez, who was born in Caracas, made his only appearance for the Venezuela Davis Cup team in a 1966 American Zone quarter-final tie against the Caribbean/West Indies. He was called upon in the doubles and teamed up with Isaías Pimentel to beat the Jamaican pairing of Lance Lumsden and Richard Russell in five sets.

At the 1966 Central American and Caribbean Games in San Juan, Álvarez won a bronze medal for Venezuela in the mixed doubles event, partnering Beatriz Raytler.
