= 1965 Davis Cup =

1965 edition of the Davis Cup

Details
- Duration: 19 February – 29 December 1965
- Edition: 54th
- Teams: 43

Champion
- Winning nation: Australia

The 1965 Davis Cup was the 54th edition of the Davis Cup, the most important tournament between national teams in men's tennis. 31 teams entered the Europe Zone, 9 teams entered the Eastern Zone, and 5 teams entered the America Zone.

The United States defeated Mexico in the America Zone final, India defeated Japan in the Eastern Inter-Zonal final, and Spain defeated South Africa in the Europe Zone final. In the Inter-Zonal Zone, Spain defeated the United States in the semifinal, and then defeated India in the final. Spain were then defeated by the defending champions Australia in the Challenge Round. The final was played at White City Stadium in Sydney, Australia on 27–29 December.

== America Zone ==
=== Draw ===
Quarterfinals; 8–10 July
Nassau, Bahamas
New Zealand | 4
Caribbean/West Indies | 0
Mexico
bye
bye
Canada
bye
United States

Semifinals; June–July
Mexico City, Mexico (clay)
New Zealand | 0
Mexico | 5
Bakersfield, CA, United States (hard)
Canada | 0
United States | 5

Final; 31 July–2 August
Dallas, TX, United States (hard)
Mexico | 1
United States | 4

=== Final ===
United States vs. Mexico

United States
4
Samuell Grand Park, Dallas, TX, United States
31 July–2 August 1965
Hard

Mexico
1

| | | | 1 | 2 | 3 | 4 | 5 |
|---|---|---|---|---|---|---|---|
| 1 | (United States) (Mexico) | Arthur Ashe; Rafael Osuna | 6; 2 | 6; 3 | 9; 7 |
| 2 | (United States) (Mexico) | Dennis Ralston; Antonio Palafox | 6; 2 | 6; 3 | 6; 2 |
| 3 | (United States) (Mexico) | Dennis Ralston / Ham Richardson; Rafael Osuna / Antonio Palafox | 6; 8 | 4; 6 | 5; 7 |
| 4 | (United States) (Mexico) | Arthur Ashe; Antonio Palafox | 6; 1 | 6; 4 | 6; 4 |
| 5 | (United States) (Mexico) | Dennis Ralston; Rafael Osuna | 6; 0 | 6; 2 | 6; 4 |

== Eastern Zone ==
=== Zone A ===
Semifinals; 23–25 April
Tokyo, Japan
Philippines | 0
Japan | 5
bye
South Korea

Final; 1–3 May
Seoul, South Korea
Japan | 5
South Korea | 0

=== Zone B ===
Quarterfinals; 19 February–1 March
Ceylon
bye
Abadan, Iran
India | 5
Iran | 0
Kuala Lumpur, Malaysia (grass)
South Vietnam | 4
Pakistan | 1
bye
Malaysia

Semifinals; 13–29 March
Colombo, Ceylon (clay)
Ceylon | 0
India | 5
Saigon, South Vietnam
South Vietnam | 5
Malaysia | 0

Final; 10–12 April
Vijayawada, India
India | 4
South Vietnam | 0

=== Eastern Inter-Zonal Final ===
Japan vs. India

Japan
1
Tokyo, Japan
1–3 October 1965

India
4

| | | | 1 | 2 | 3 | 4 | 5 |
|---|---|---|---|---|---|---|---|
| 1 | (Japan) (India) | Koji Watanabe; Jaidip Mukerjea | 0; 6 | 4; 6 | 5; 7 |
| 2 | (Japan) (India) | Osamu Ishiguro; Ramanathan Krishnan | 4; 6 | 4; 6 | 2; 6 |
| 3 | (Japan) (India) | Osamu Ishiguro / Koji Watanabe; Ramanathan Krishnan / Jaidip Mukerjea | 6; 3 | 6; 4 | 2; 6 | 6; 4 |
| 4 | (Japan) (India) | Koji Watanabe; Ramanathan Krishnan | 6; 8 | 2; 6 | 7; 9 |
| 5 | (Japan) (India) | Osamu Ishiguro; Jaidip Mukerjea | 7; 5 | 7; 5 | 2; 6 | 6; 8 | 4; 6 |

== Europe Zone ==
=== Draw ===
First Round; 28 April–3 May
Sweden | 4
Poland | 1
Czechoslovakia | w/o
Monaco
Italy | 5
Portugal | 0
Hungary | 2
Brazil | 3
West Germany | 5
Switzerland | 0
Turkey | 2
Luxembourg | 3
Spain | 5
Greece | 0
Belgium | 1
Chile | 3
Egypt
Norway | w/o
Netherlands | 0
South Africa | 4
Ireland | 0
Denmark | 3
Israel | 1
Great Britain | 4
Rhodesia | w/o
Soviet Union
Morocco | 0
Yugoslavia | 5
Finland | 1
Austria | 4
bye
France

Second Round; 13–16 May
Stockholm, Sweden (clay)
Sweden | 2
Czechoslovakia | 3
Milan, Italy (clay)
Italy | 3
Brazil | 2
Wiesbaden, West Germany
West Germany | 5
Luxembourg | 0
Barcelona, Spain (clay)
Spain | 5
Chile | 0
Oslo, Norway (clay)
Norway | 0
South Africa | 5
Copenhagen, Denmark (clay)
Denmark | 1
Great Britain | 3
Zagreb, Yugoslavia
Rhodesia | 0
Yugoslavia | 5
Vienna, Austria
Austria | 0
France | 5

Quarterfinals; 10–13 June
Prague, Czechoslovakia (clay)
Czechoslovakia | 3
Italy | 2
Barcelona, Spain (clay)
West Germany | 1
Spain | 4
Eastbourne, England (grass)
South Africa | 3
Great Britain | 2
Paris, France (clay)
Yugoslavia | 0
France | 5

Semifinals; 16–18 July
Prague, Czechoslovakia (clay)
Czechoslovakia | 1
Spain | 4
Paris, France (clay)
South Africa | 4
France | 1

Final; 30 July–1 August
Barcelona, Spain (clay)
Spain | 4
South Africa | 1

=== Final ===
Spain vs. South Africa

Spain
4
Real Club de Tenis, Barcelona, Spain
30 July–1 August 1965
Clay

South Africa
1

| | | | 1 | 2 | 3 | 4 | 5 |
|---|---|---|---|---|---|---|---|
| 1 | (Spain) (South Africa) | Manuel Santana; Cliff Drysdale | 6; 3 | 6; 3 | 6; 2 |
| 2 | (Spain) (South Africa) | Juan Gisbert; Keith Diepraam | 6; 2 | 6; 1 | 3; 6 | 3; 6 | 6; 2 |
| 3 | (Spain) (South Africa) | José Luis Arilla / Manuel Santana; Keith Diepraam / Frew McMillan | 9; 7 | 4; 6 | 6; 3 | 6; 2 |
| 4 | (Spain) (South Africa) | Juan Gisbert; Cliff Drysdale | 2; 6 | 6; 4 | 3; 6 | 2; 6 |
| 5 | (Spain) (South Africa) | Manuel Santana; Keith Diepraam | 6; 1 | 6; 3 | 6; 3 |

== Inter-Zonal Zone ==
=== Draw ===
Semifinals; 17–19 August
EAS | India
bye
Barcelona, Spain (clay)
AME | United States | 1
EUR | Spain | 4

Final; 5–7 November
Barcelona, Spain (clay)
EAS | India | 2
EUR | Spain | 3

=== Semifinals ===
Spain vs. United States

Spain
4
Real Club de Tenis, Barcelona, Spain
17–19 August 1965
Clay

United States
1

| | | | 1 | 2 | 3 | 4 | 5 |
|---|---|---|---|---|---|---|---|
| 1 | (Spain) (United States) | Juan Gisbert; Dennis Ralston | 3; 6 | 8; 6 | 6; 1 | 6; 3 |
| 2 | (Spain) (United States) | Manuel Santana; Frank Froehling | 6; 1 | 6; 4 | 6; 4 |
| 3 | (Spain) (United States) | José Luis Arilla / Manuel Santana; Clark Graebner / Dennis Ralston | 4; 6 | 3; 6 | 6; 3 | 6; 4 | 11; 9 |
| 4 | (Spain) (United States) | Juan Gisbert; Frank Froehling | 6; 3 | 3; 6 | 6; 4 | 2; 6 | 6; 3 |
| 5 | (Spain) (United States) | Juan Manuel Couder; Dennis Ralston | 6; 4 | 4; 6 | 3; 6 | 3; 6 |

=== Final ===
Spain vs. India

Spain
3
Real Club de Tenis, Barcelona, Spain
5–7 November 1965
Clay

India
2

| | | | 1 | 2 | 3 | 4 | 5 |
|---|---|---|---|---|---|---|---|
| 1 | (Spain) (India) | Juan Gisbert; Ramanathan Krishnan | 2; 6 | 0; 6 | 1; 6 |
| 2 | (Spain) (India) | Manuel Santana; Jaidip Mukerjea | 6; 0 | 6; 4 | 6; 4 |
| 3 | (Spain) (India) | José Luis Arilla / Manuel Santana; Premjit Lall / Jaidip Mukerjea | 8; 6 | 6; 2 | 10; 8 |
| 4 | (Spain) (India) | Manuel Santana; Ramanathan Krishnan | 6; 3 | 6; 3 | 6; 3 |
| 5 | (Spain) (India) | Juan Gisbert; Jaidip Mukerjea | 6; 4 | 5; 7 | 2; 6 | 6; 3 | 4; 6 |

== Challenge Round ==
Australia vs. Spain

Australia
4
White City Stadium, Sydney, Australia
27–29 December 1965
Grass

Spain
1

| | | | 1 | 2 | 3 | 4 | 5 |
|---|---|---|---|---|---|---|---|
| 1 | (Australia) (Spain) | Fred Stolle; Manuel Santana | 10; 12 | 3; 6 | 6; 1 | 6; 4 | 7; 5 |
| 2 | (Australia) (Spain) | Roy Emerson; Juan Gisbert | 6; 3 | 6; 2 | 6; 2 |
| 3 | (Australia) (Spain) | John Newcombe / Tony Roche; José Luis Arilla / Manuel Santana | 6; 3 | 4; 6 | 7; 5 | 6; 2 |
| 4 | (Australia) (Spain) | Roy Emerson; Manuel Santana | 6; 2 | 3; 6 | 4; 6 | 13; 15 |
| 5 | (Australia) (Spain) | Fred Stolle; Juan Gisbert | 6; 2 | 6; 4 | 8; 6 |
