= Italy Davis Cup team results (1970–1999) =

The following article details all results for the Italy Davis Cup team in the period between 1970 and 1999. It only includes ties in the Davis Cup; it does not include ties from the World Team Cup. They played a total of 74 Davis Cup ties.

In this period, Italy were Davis Cup champions in 1976, finalists on four occasions (1977, 1979, 1980 and 1998) and they reached the semifinals twice (consecutively in 1996 and 1997).

Italy reached the quarterfinals on 8 occasions and survived the World Group Playoff 6 times. They maintained World Group status for all nineteen editions of the Davis Cup since its creation in 1981 in this period.

== 1970s ==
=== 1970 ===
1970 Davis Cup Europe Zone B First Round

Italy
2
Turin, Italy
7–11 May 1970
Clay

Czechoslovakia
3

			1	2	3	4	5
1	(Italy) (Czechoslovakia)	Massimo Di Domenico; Jan Kodeš	3; 6	6; 1	6; 3	4; 6	4; 6
2	(Italy) (Czechoslovakia)	Adriano Panatta; Jan Kukal	8; 6	6; 3	6; 3
3	(Italy) (Czechoslovakia)	Massimo Di Domenico / Adriano Panatta; Jan Kodeš / Jan Kukal	6; 4	2; 6	6; 2	3; 6	6; 3
4	(Italy) (Czechoslovakia)	Massimo Di Domenico; Jan Kukal	9; 7	4; 6	5; 7	7; 9
5	(Italy) (Czechoslovakia)	Adriano Panatta; Jan Kodeš	3; 6	2; 6	2; 6

=== 1971 ===
1971 Davis Cup Europe Zone B First Round

Italy
5
Perugia, Italy
30 April–2 May 1971
Clay

Bulgaria
0

			1	2	3	4	5
1	(Italy) (Bulgaria)	Massimo Di Domenico; Bozhidar Pampoulov	3; 6	6; 2	6; 1	6; 3
2	(Italy) (Bulgaria)	Adriano Panatta; Ljuben Genov	6; 1	6; 3	6; 3
3	(Italy) (Bulgaria)	Massimo Di Domenico / Adriano Panatta; Bozhidar Pampoulov / Matei Pampoulov	6; 4	6; 4	6; 4
4	(Italy) (Bulgaria)	Antonio Zugarelli; Ljuben Genov	6; 4	6; 2	6; 3
5	(Italy) (Bulgaria)	Ezio Di Matteo; Bozhidar Pampoulov	6; 3	6; 3	6; 1

1971 Davis Cup Europe Zone B Quarterfinals

Yugoslavia
3
Zagreb, Yugoslavia
14–16 May 1971

Italy
2

			1	2	3	4	5
1	(Socialist Federal Republic of Yugoslavia) (Italy)	Željko Franulović; Nicola Pietrangeli	7; 5	8; 6	6; 1
2	(Socialist Federal Republic of Yugoslavia) (Italy)	Boro Jovanović; Adriano Panatta	6; 0	3; 6	4; 6	6; 3	6; 2
3	(Socialist Federal Republic of Yugoslavia) (Italy)	Željko Franulović / Boro Jovanović; Massimo Di Domenico / Adriano Panatta	3; 6	6; 0	4; 6	7; 5	6; 3
4	(Socialist Federal Republic of Yugoslavia) (Italy)	Boro Jovanović; Nicola Pietrangeli	2; 6	2; 6	1; 6
5	(Socialist Federal Republic of Yugoslavia) (Italy)	Zlatko Ivančić; Antonio Zugarelli	4; 6	3; 6	2; 6

=== 1972 ===
1972 Davis Cup Europe Zone A First Round

Italy
5
Reggio Calabria, Italy
5–7 May 1972
Clay

Austria
0

			1	2	3	4	5
1	(Italy) (Austria)	Corrado Barazzutti; Ernst Blanke	6; 2	0; 6	6; 1	6; 3
2	(Italy) (Austria)	Paolo Bertolucci; Hans Kary	6; 3	6; 1	6; 3
3	(Italy) (Austria)	Adriano Panatta / Nicola Pietrangeli; Ernst Blanke / Rudolf Hoskowetz	6; 3	6; 4	6; 4
4	(Italy) (Austria)	Corrado Barazzutti; Hans Kary	6; 8	6; 4	4; 6	6; 3	6; 4
5	(Italy) (Austria)	Paolo Bertolucci; Rudolf Hoskowetz	6; 4	6; 2	6; 3

1972 Davis Cup Europe Zone A Quarterfinals

Italy
4
San Benedetto del Tronto, Italy
20–22 May 1972
Clay

Netherlands
1

			1	2	3	4	5
1	(Italy) (Netherlands)	Adriano Panatta; Jan Hordijk	10; 8	6; 2	6; 3
2	(Italy) (Netherlands)	Paolo Bertolucci; Fred Hemmes	6; 0	6; 4	2; 6	6; 3
3	(Italy) (Netherlands)	Adriano Panatta / Nicola Pietrangeli; Fred Hemmes / Jan Hordijk	3; 6	6; 1	6; 4	6; 2
4	(Italy) (Netherlands)	Paolo Bertolucci; Jan Hordijk	6; 1	6; 8	6; 1	5; 7	6; 8
5	(Italy) (Netherlands)	Adriano Panatta; Fred Hemmes	6; 1	6; 1	6; 1

1972 Davis Cup Europe Zone A Semifinals

Romania
4
Bucharest, Romania
16–18 June 1972
Clay

Italy
1

			1	2	3	4	5
1	(Romania) (Italy)	Ilie Năstase; Corrado Barazzutti	7; 5	6; 2	6; 0
2	(Romania) (Italy)	Ion Țiriac; Adriano Panatta	8; 6	7; 5	0; 6	6; 3
3	(Romania) (Italy)	Ilie Năstase / Ion Țiriac; Adriano Panatta / Nicola Pietrangeli	6; 2	9; 7	6; 4
4	(Romania) (Italy)	Petre Mărmureanu; Corrado Barazzutti	4; 6	5; 7	2; 6
5	(Romania) (Italy)	Ilie Năstase; Adriano Panatta	4; 6	6; 0	6; 3	6; 1

=== 1973 ===
1973 Davis Cup Europe Zone B Quarterfinals

Italy
5
Reggio Emilia, Italy
18–20 May 1973
Clay

Bulgaria
0

			1	2	3	4	5
1	(Italy) (Bulgaria)	Paolo Bertolucci; Bozhidar Pampoulov	8; 6	6; 1	6; 4
2	(Italy) (Bulgaria)	Adriano Panatta; Ljuben Genov	6; 1	6; 2	6; 3
3	(Italy) (Bulgaria)	Paolo Bertolucci / Adriano Panatta; Bozhidar Pampoulov / Matei Pampoulov	6; 2	7; 5	6; 4
4	(Italy) (Bulgaria)	Paolo Bertolucci; Ljuben Genov	6; 3	6; 3	6; 3
5	(Italy) (Bulgaria)	Adriano Panatta; Bozhidar Pampoulov	6; 4	3; 6	6; 3	6; 3

1973 Davis Cup Europe Zone B Semifinals

Italy
3
Turin, Italy
20–22 July 1973
Clay

Spain
2

			1	2	3	4	5
1	(Italy) (Spain)	Corrado Barazzutti; Manuel Santana	7; 5	1; 6	6; 4	6; 4
2	(Italy) (Spain)	Antonio Zugarelli; José Higueras	7; 5	6; 3	6; 2
3	(Italy) (Spain)	Giordano Maioli / Pietro Marzano; Juan Gisbert / José Higueras	3; 6	1; 6	6; 4	4; 6
4	(Italy) (Spain)	Corrado Barazzutti; José Higueras	6; 4	6; 3	6; 1
5	(Italy) (Spain)	Antonio Zugarelli; Manuel Santana	6; 2	3; 6	3; 6	2; 6

1973 Davis Cup Europe Zone B Final

Czechoslovakia
4
Prague, Czechoslovakia
3–5 August 1973
Clay

Italy
1

			1	2	3	4	5
1	(Czechoslovakia) (Italy)	Jan Kodeš; Corrado Barazzutti	5; 7	6; 3	4; 6	6; 2	1; 6
2	(Czechoslovakia) (Italy)	Jiří Hřebec; Antonio Zugarelli	12; 10	6; 1	6; 1
3	(Czechoslovakia) (Italy)	Jan Kodeš / František Pála; Giordano Majoli / Pietro Marzano	6; 2	8; 6	6; 4
4	(Czechoslovakia) (Italy)	Jiří Hřebec; Corrado Barazzutti	9; 7	6; 1	6; 4
5	(Czechoslovakia) (Italy)	Jan Kodeš; Antonio Zugarelli	6; 1	6; 3	0; 6	6; 2

=== 1974 ===
1974 Davis Cup Europe Zone A Semifinals

Sweden
2
Båstad Tennis Stadium, Båstad, Sweden
19–21 July 1974
Clay

Italy
3

			1	2	3	4	5
1	(Sweden) (Italy)	Björn Borg; Paolo Bertolucci	7; 5	6; 1	6; 0
2	(Sweden) (Italy)	Leif Johansson; Adriano Panatta	6; 8	1; 6	6; 4	1; 6
3	(Sweden) (Italy)	Ove Bengtson / Björn Borg; Paolo Bertolucci / Adriano Panatta	1; 6	7; 5	5; 7	4; 6
4	(Sweden) (Italy)	Leif Johansson; Paolo Bertolucci	6; 3	3; 6	7; 5	5; 7	6; 8
5	(Sweden) (Italy)	Björn Borg; Adriano Panatta	6; 4	4; 6	9; 7	6; 3

1974 Davis Cup Europe Zone A Final

Italy
3
Mestre, Italy
2–4 August 1974
Clay

Romania
2

			1	2	3	4	5
1	(Italy) (Romania)	Corrado Barazzutti; Ilie Năstase	7; 9	0; 6	1; 6
2	(Italy) (Romania)	Adriano Panatta; Ion Țiriac	6; 1	6; 3	6; 2
3	(Italy) (Romania)	Paolo Bertolucci / Adriano Panatta; Ilie Năstase / Ion Țiriac	6; 4	8; 6	6; 8	4; 6	6; 2
4	(Italy) (Romania)	Corrado Barazzutti; Ion Țiriac	6; 3	6; 0	6; 0
5	(Italy) (Romania)	Adriano Panatta; Ilie Năstase	0; 6	0; 6	5; 7

1974 Davis Cup Semifinal

South Africa
4
Ellis Park, Johannesburg, South Africa
3–5 October 1974 (Note: The South Africa vs. Italy tie was originally scheduled to be played from 22 September, but was postponed due to disagreements over the venue: Italy originally refused to travel to South Africa, while South Africa rejected Italy's request to play the match in Rome. The match eventually went ahead in South Africa on 3 October.)

Italy
1

			1	2	3	4	5
1	(South Africa) (Italy)	Bob Hewitt; Antonio Zugarelli	4; 6	6; 0	9; 7	4; 6	6; 1
2	(South Africa) (Italy)	Ray Moore; Adriano Panatta	4; 6	6; 4	6; 3	6; 4
3	(South Africa) (Italy)	Bob Hewitt / Frew McMillan; Paolo Bertolucci / Adriano Panatta	7; 5	6; 4	10; 8
4	(South Africa) (Italy)	Ray Moore; Antonio Zugarelli	6; 3	7; 5	6; 3
5	(South Africa) (Italy)	Bob Hewitt; Adriano Panatta	3; 6	6; 8	2; 6

=== 1975 ===
1975 Davis Cup Europe Zone B Semifinals

France
3
Stade Roland Garros, Paris, France
20–22 June 1975
Clay

Italy
2

			1	2	3	4	5
1	(France) (Italy)	François Jauffret; Adriano Panatta	6; 1	6; 4	8; 6
2	(France) (Italy)	Patrice Dominguez; Corrado Barazzutti	6; 4	0; 6	1; 6	3; 6
3	(France) (Italy)	Patrice Dominguez / François Jauffret; Paolo Bertolucci / Adriano Panatta	1; 6	4; 6	1; 6
4	(France) (Italy)	Patrice Dominguez; Adriano Panatta	6; 3	1; 6	7; 5	6; 3
5	(France) (Italy)	François Jauffret; Corrado Barazzutti	6; 2	4; 6	6; 3	3; 6	6; 3

=== 1976 ===
1976 Davis Cup Europe Zone B Quarterfinals

Italy
5
Bologna, Italy
21–23 May 1976
Clay

Yugoslavia
0

			1	2	3	4	5
1	(Italy) (Socialist Federal Republic of Yugoslavia)	Corrado Barazzutti; Željko Franulović	6; 1	7; 5	6; 4
2	(Italy) (Socialist Federal Republic of Yugoslavia)	Adriano Panatta; Nikola Pilić	6; 3	6; 4	6; 3
3	(Italy) (Socialist Federal Republic of Yugoslavia)	Paolo Bertolucci / Adriano Panatta; Željko Franulović / Nikola Pilić	6; 2	9; 7	7; 5
4	(Italy) (Socialist Federal Republic of Yugoslavia)	Adriano Panatta; Željko Franulović	6; 1	6; 1	6; 3
5	(Italy) (Socialist Federal Republic of Yugoslavia)	Corrado Barazzutti; Nikola Pilić	6; 0	6; 4	6; 4

1976 Davis Cup Europe Zone B Semifinals

Italy
4
Foro Italico, Rome, Italy
16–18 July 1976
Clay

Sweden
0

			1	2	3	4	5
1	(Italy) (Sweden)	Adriano Panatta; Rolf Norberg	6; 2	6; 2	7; 5
2	(Italy) (Sweden)	Corrado Barazzutti; Kjell Johansson	6; 2	6; 4	3; 6	3; 6	6; 2
3	(Italy) (Sweden)	Paolo Bertolucci / Adriano Panatta; Ove Bengtson / Rolf Norberg	7; 5	6; 2	7; 5
4	(Italy) (Sweden)	Antonio Zugarelli; Kjell Johansson	7; 5	5; 7	8; 6	4; 6	8; 6
5	(Italy) (Sweden)	Corrado Barazzutti; Rolf Norberg	6; 4	2; 6				not completed

1976 Davis Cup Europe Zone B Final

Great Britain
1
No. 1 Court, All England Club, Wimbledon, United Kingdom
5–7 August 1976
Grass

Italy
4

			1	2	3	4	5
1	(United Kingdom) (Italy)	Roger Taylor; Antonio Zugarelli	1; 6	5; 7	6; 3	1; 6
2	(United Kingdom) (Italy)	John Lloyd; Adriano Panatta	7; 5	3; 6	3; 6	6; 2	4; 6
3	(United Kingdom) (Italy)	David Lloyd / John Lloyd; Paolo Bertolucci / Adriano Panatta	6; 8	3; 6	6; 3	18; 16	6; 2
4	(United Kingdom) (Italy)	Roger Taylor; Adriano Panatta	6; 3	2; 6	4; 6	4; 6
5	(United Kingdom) (Italy)	John Lloyd; Antonio Zugarelli	6; 4	8; 6	1; 6	1; 6	1; 6

1976 Davis Cup Semifinals

Italy
3
Foro Italico, Rome, Italy
24–27 September 1976
Clay

Australia
2

			1	2	3	4	5
1	(Italy) (Australia)	Corrado Barazzutti; John Newcombe	7; 5	6; 1	6; 4
2	(Italy) (Australia)	Adriano Panatta; John Alexander	5; 7	3; 6	4; 6
3	(Italy) (Australia)	Paolo Bertolucci / Adriano Panatta; John Newcombe / Tony Roche	6; 3	6; 4	6; 3
4	(Italy) (Australia)	Corrado Barazzutti; John Alexander	2; 6	2; 6	7; 5	6; 4	2; 6
5	(Italy) (Australia)	Adriano Panatta; John Newcombe	5; 7	8; 6	6; 4	6; 2

1976 Davis Cup Final

Chile
1
Estadio Nacional, Santiago, Chile
17–19 December 1976
Clay

Italy
4

			1	2	3	4	5
1	(Chile) (Italy)	Jaime Fillol; Corrado Barazzutti	5; 7	6; 4	5; 7	1; 6
2	(Chile) (Italy)	Patricio Cornejo; Adriano Panatta	3; 6	1; 6	3; 6
3	(Chile) (Italy)	Patricio Cornejo / Jaime Fillol; Paolo Bertolucci / Adriano Panatta	6; 3	2; 6	7; 9	3; 6
4	(Chile) (Italy)	Jaime Fillol; Adriano Panatta	6; 8	4; 6	6; 3	8; 10
5	(Chile) (Italy)	Belus Prajoux; Tonino Zugarelli	6; 4	6; 3	6; 2

=== 1977 ===
1977 Davis Cup Europe Zone B Semifinals

Sweden
1
Båstad Tennis Stadium, Båstad, Sweden
23–25 July 1977
Clay

Italy
4

			1	2	3	4	5
1	(Sweden) (Italy)	Birger Andersson; Adriano Panatta	5; 7	4; 6	4; 6
2	(Sweden) (Italy)	Rolf Norberg; Corrado Barazzutti	3; 6	1; 6	2; 6
3	(Sweden) (Italy)	Jan Norbäck / Rolf Norberg; Paolo Bertolucci / Adriano Panatta	3; 6	3; 6	6; 3	4; 6
4	(Sweden) (Italy)	Jan Norbäck; Antonio Zugarelli	6; 1	3; 6	6; 2	6; 2
5	(Sweden) (Italy)	Birger Andersson; Corrado Barazzutti	6; 4	2; 6	1; 6	3; 6

1977 Davis Cup Europe Zone B Final

Spain
2
Barcelona, Spain
15–17 July 1977

Italy
3

			1	2	3	4	5
1	(Spain) (Italy)	José Higueras; Corrado Barazzutti	6; 4	6; 4	6; 3
2	(Spain) (Italy)	Manuel Orantes; Adriano Panatta	4; 6	6; 3	3; 6	1; 6
3	(Spain) (Italy)	José Higueras / Antonio Muñoz; Paolo Bertolucci / Adriano Panatta	4; 6	5; 7	4; 6
4	(Spain) (Italy)	Manuel Orantes; Corrado Barazzutti	5; 7	5; 7	1; 6
5	(Spain) (Italy)	Javier Soler; Adriano Panatta	6; 1	6; 0

1977 Davis Cup Semifinals

Italy
4
Foro Italico, Rome, Italy
14–16 September 1977
Clay

France
1

			1	2	3	4	5
1	(Italy) (France)	Adriano Panatta; Patrice Dominguez	6; 4	4; 6	6; 4	3; 6	6; 3
2	(Italy) (France)	Corrado Barazzutti; François Jauffret	6; 4	2; 6	2; 6	6; 2	6; 1
3	(Italy) (France)	Paolo Bertolucci / Adriano Panatta; Patrice Dominguez / François Jauffret	6; 1	3; 6	9; 7	6; 1
4	(Italy) (France)	Adriano Panatta; François Jauffret	6; 2	6; 1
5	(Italy) (France)	Corrado Barazzutti; Patrice Dominguez	2; 6	6; 0	6; 8

1977 Davis Cup Final

Australia
3
White City Stadium, Sydney, Australia
2–4 December 1977
Grass

Italy
1

			1	2	3	4	5
1	(Australia) (Italy)	Tony Roche; Adriano Panatta	6; 3	6; 4	6; 4
2	(Australia) (Italy)	John Alexander; Corrado Barazzutti	6; 2	8; 6	4; 6	6; 2
3	(Australia) (Italy)	John Alexander / Phil Dent; Paolo Bertolucci / Adriano Panatta	4; 6	4; 6	5; 7
4	(Australia) (Italy)	John Alexander; Adriano Panatta	6; 4	4; 6	2; 6	8; 6	11; 9
5	(Australia) (Italy)	Tony Roche; Corrado Barazzutti	12; 12					not completed

=== 1978 ===
1978 Davis Cup Europe Zone B Semifinals

Hungary
4
Budapest, Hungary
13–15 July 1978

Italy
1

			1	2	3	4	5
1	(Hungary) (Italy)	Péter Szőke; Corrado Barazzutti	6; 2	1; 6	5; 7	3; 6
2	(Hungary) (Italy)	Balázs Taróczy; Adriano Panatta	6; 4	6; 3	11; 9
3	(Hungary) (Italy)	Péter Szőke / Balázs Taróczy; Paolo Bertolucci / Adriano Panatta	6; 3	6; 2	6; 4
4	(Hungary) (Italy)	Péter Szőke; Adriano Panatta	6; 3	3; 6	6; 0	8; 6
5	(Hungary) (Italy)	Balázs Taróczy; Corrado Barazzutti	6; 3	6; 4	6; 4

=== 1979 ===
1979 Davis Cup Europe Zone A Qualifying round

Italy
5
Palermo, Italy
16–18 March 1979
Clay

Denmark
0

			1	2	3	4	5
1	(Italy) (Denmark)	Adriano Panatta; Michael Mortensen	6; 2	6; 0	6; 2
2	(Italy) (Denmark)	Corrado Barazzutti; Carl-Edvard Hedelund	6; 1	6; 1	6; 2
3	(Italy) (Denmark)	Paolo Bertolucci / Adriano Panatta; Carl-Edvard Hedelund / Michael Mortensen	6; 0	6; 8	6; 2	6; 2
4	(Italy) (Denmark)	Corrado Barazzutti; Michael Mortensen	6; 1	6; 1
5	(Italy) (Denmark)	Adriano Panatta; Carl-Edvard Hedelund	6; 0	6; 3	6; 1

1979 Davis Cup Europe Zone A Quarterfinals

Poland
1
Warsaw, Poland
15–17 June 1979

Italy
4

			1	2	3	4	5
1	(Poland) (Italy)	Wojciech Fibak; Adriano Panatta	6; 2	6; 0	2; 6	6; 4
2	(Poland) (Italy)	Henryk Drzymalski; Corrado Barazzutti	3; 6	2; 6	1; 6
3	(Poland) (Italy)	Wojciech Fibak / Tadeusz Nowicki; Corrado Barazzutti / Adriano Panatta	1; 6	6; 4	12; 14	2; 6
4	(Poland) (Italy)	Wojciech Fibak; Corrado Barazzutti	5; 7	7; 5	6; 3	4; 6	2; 6
5	(Poland) (Italy)	Henryk Drzymalski; Adriano Panatta	2; 6	1; 6

1979 Davis Cup Europe Zone A Semifinals

Italy
3
Foro Italico, Rome, Italy
13–15 July 1979
Clay

Hungary
2

			1	2	3	4	5
1	(Italy) (Hungary)	Adriano Panatta; Péter Szőke	6; 2	6; 0	6; 3
2	(Italy) (Hungary)	Corrado Barazzutti; Balázs Taróczy	9; 7	6; 2	3; 6	7; 5
3	(Italy) (Hungary)	Paolo Bertolucci / Adriano Panatta; Péter Szőke / Balázs Taróczy	3; 6	6; 3	0; 6	6; 8
4	(Italy) (Hungary)	Corrado Barazzutti; Péter Szőke	6; 4	6; 1	6; 1
5	(Italy) (Hungary)	Antonio Zugarelli; Balázs Taróczy	4; 6	3; 6

1979 Davis Cup Europe Zone A Final

Italy
4
Foro Italico, Rome, Italy
14–16 September 1979
Clay

Great Britain
1

			1	2	3	4	5
1	(Italy) (United Kingdom)	Adriano Panatta; Buster Mottram	0; 6	4; 6	4; 6
2	(Italy) (United Kingdom)	Corrado Barazzutti; John Lloyd	6; 1	6; 4	6; 4
3	(Italy) (United Kingdom)	Corrado Barazzutti / Antonio Zugarelli; Mark Cox / David Lloyd	7; 5	10; 8	6; 1
4	(Italy) (United Kingdom)	Adriano Panatta; John Lloyd	6; 3	6; 2	6; 3
5	(Italy) (United Kingdom)	Corrado Barazzutti; Buster Mottram	8; 6	7; 5

1979 Davis Cup Semifinals

Italy
4
Foro Italico, Rome, Italy
5–7 October 1979
Clay

Czechoslovakia
1

			1	2	3	4	5
1	(Italy) (Czechoslovakia)	Corrado Barazzutti; Tomáš Šmíd	1; 6	6; 3	1; 6	6; 3	5; 7
2	(Italy) (Czechoslovakia)	Adriano Panatta; Ivan Lendl	6; 4	1; 6	6; 0	6; 0
3	(Italy) (Czechoslovakia)	Paolo Bertolucci / Adriano Panatta; Jan Kodeš / Tomáš Šmíd	6; 8	6; 2	6; 1	6; 2
4	(Italy) (Czechoslovakia)	Corrado Barazzutti; Ivan Lendl	4; 6	6; 1	6; 2	3; 6	7; 5
5	(Italy) (Czechoslovakia)	Adriano Panatta; Tomáš Šmíd	6; 3	6; 2

1979 Davis Cup Final

United States
5
Civic Auditorium, San Francisco, United States
14–16 December 1979
Carpet (indoors)

Italy
0

			1	2	3	4	5
1	(United States) (Italy)	Vitas Gerulaitis; Corrado Barazzutti	6; 2	3; 2				retired
2	(United States) (Italy)	John McEnroe; Adriano Panatta	6; 2	6; 3	6; 4
3	(United States) (Italy)	Bob Lutz / Stan Smith; Paolo Bertolucci / Adriano Panatta	6; 4	12; 10	6; 2
4	(United States) (Italy)	John McEnroe; Antonio Zugarelli	6; 4	6; 3	6; 1
5	(United States) (Italy)	Vitas Gerulaitis; Adriano Panatta	6; 1	6; 3	6; 3

== 1980s ==
=== 1980 ===
1980 Davis Cup Europe Zone Semifinals

Italy
5
Turin, Italy
13–15 June 1980
Clay

Switzerland
0

			1	2	3	4	5
1	(Italy) (Switzerland)	Corrado Barazzutti; Heinz Günthardt	6; 4	6; 1	6; 4
2	(Italy) (Switzerland)	Adriano Panatta; Roland Stadler	6; 4	10; 8	6; 1
3	(Italy) (Switzerland)	Paolo Bertolucci / Adriano Panatta; Heinz Günthardt / Markus Günthardt	7; 9	10; 8	1; 6	6; 4	6; 2
4	(Italy) (Switzerland)	Corrado Barazzutti; Roland Stadler	6; 3	6; 4
5	(Italy) (Switzerland)	Gianni Ocleppo; Ivan Dupasquier	6; 0	6; 3

1980 Davis Cup Europe Zone Final

Italy
4
Foro Italico, Rome, Italy
11–13 July 1980
Clay

Sweden
1

			1	2	3	4	5
1	(Italy) (Sweden)	Corrado Barazzutti; Kjell Johansson	6; 3	6; 3	6; 2
2	(Italy) (Sweden)	Adriano Panatta; Stefan Simonsson	6; 8	6; 1	2; 6	6; 4	4; 6
3	(Italy) (Sweden)	Paolo Bertolucci / Adriano Panatta; Hans Simonsson / Stefan Simonsson	6; 2	6; 3	7; 5
4	(Italy) (Sweden)	Adriano Panatta; Kjell Johansson	3; 6	6; 3	6; 4	1; 6	6; 4
5	(Italy) (Sweden)	Corrado Barazzutti; Stefan Simonsson	8; 6	6; 1

1980 Davis Cup Semifinals

Italy
3
Foro Italico, Rome, Italy
19–21 September 1980
Clay

Australia
2

			1	2	3	4	5
1	(Italy) (Australia)	Adriano Panatta; Paul McNamee	5; 7	6; 4	6; 0	6; 4
2	(Italy) (Australia)	Corrado Barazzutti; Peter McNamara	8; 10	6; 1	4; 6	2; 6
3	(Italy) (Australia)	Paolo Bertolucci / Adriano Panatta; Peter McNamara / Paul McNamee	2; 6	9; 7	9; 7	2; 6	6; 4
4	(Italy) (Australia)	Adriano Panatta; Peter McNamara	6; 1	7; 5	6; 4
5	(Italy) (Australia)	Corrado Barazzutti; Rod Frawley	6; 2	4; 6	6; 8

1980 Davis Cup Final

Czechoslovakia
4
Sportovní hala, Prague, Czechoslovakia
5–7 December 1980
Carpet (indoors)

Italy
1

			1	2	3	4	5
1	(Czechoslovakia) (Italy)	Tomáš Šmíd; Adriano Panatta	3; 6	3; 6	6; 3	6; 4	6; 4
2	(Czechoslovakia) (Italy)	Ivan Lendl; Corrado Barazzutti	4; 6	6; 1	6; 1	6; 2
3	(Czechoslovakia) (Italy)	Ivan Lendl / Tomáš Šmíd; Paolo Bertolucci / Adriano Panatta	3; 6	6; 3	3; 6	6; 3	6; 4
4	(Czechoslovakia) (Italy)	Tomáš Šmíd; Corrado Barazzutti	6; 3	3; 6	2; 6
5	(Czechoslovakia) (Italy)	Ivan Lendl; Gianni Ocleppo	6; 3	6; 3

=== 1981 ===
1981 Davis Cup World Group First Round

Great Britain
3
Brighton Centre, Brighton, United Kingdom
6–8 March 1981
Carpet (indoors)

Italy
2

			1	2	3	4	5
1	(United Kingdom) (Italy)	Buster Mottram; Adriano Panatta	9; 7	3; 6	6; 3	6; 4
2	(United Kingdom) (Italy)	Richard Lewis; Corrado Barazzutti	4; 6	6; 1	8; 6	7; 9	4; 6
3	(United Kingdom) (Italy)	Andrew Jarrett / Jonathan Smith; Paolo Bertolucci / Adriano Panatta	6; 1	3; 6	6; 3	3; 6	7; 5
4	(United Kingdom) (Italy)	Richard Lewis; Adriano Panatta	4; 6	2; 6	4; 6
5	(United Kingdom) (Italy)	Buster Mottram; Corrado Barazzutti	6; 3	6; 2	6; 2

1981 Davis Cup World Group Play-off

Italy
4
Sanremo, Italy
2–4 October 1981
Clay

South Korea
1

			1	2	3	4	5
1	(Italy) (South Korea)	Corrado Barazzutti; Lee Woo-ryong	6; 0	6; 2	6; 3
2	(Italy) (South Korea)	Adriano Panatta; Kim Choon-ho	6; 4	6; 4	7; 5
3	(Italy) (South Korea)	Paolo Bertolucci / Adriano Panatta; Kim Choon-ho / Song Dong-wook	6; 2	7; 5	6; 4
4	(Italy) (South Korea)	Corrado Barazzutti; Kim Choon-ho	6; 2	6; 8	2; 6	6; 2	1; 6
5	(Italy) (South Korea)	Gianni Ocleppo; Jeon Chang-dae	6; 3	8; 10	6; 3	6; 4

=== 1982 ===
1982 Davis Cup World Group First Round

Italy
3
Foro Italico, Rome, Italy
5–7 March 1982
Clay

Great Britain
2

			1	2	3	4	5
1	(Italy) (United Kingdom)	Adriano Panatta; Buster Mottram	7; 5	5; 7	3; 6	4; 6
2	(Italy) (United Kingdom)	Corrado Barazzutti; Richard Lewis	11; 9	6; 1	6; 1
3	(Italy) (United Kingdom)	Paolo Bertolucci / Adriano Panatta; Andrew Jarrett / Jonathan Smith	6; 4	6; 3	6; 3
4	(Italy) (United Kingdom)	Corrado Barazzutti; Buster Mottram	4; 6	3; 6	5; 7
5	(Italy) (United Kingdom)	Adriano Panatta; Richard Lewis	8; 6	6; 4	6; 2

1982 Davis Cup World Group Quarterfinals

Italy
2
Cervia, Italy
9–11 July 1982
Clay

New Zealand
3

			1	2	3	4	5
1	(Italy) (New Zealand)	Corrado Barazzutti; Chris Lewis	6; 3	1; 6	4; 6	3; 6
2	(Italy) (New Zealand)	Adriano Panatta; Russell Simpson	6; 4	3; 6	7; 5	4; 6	2; 6
3	(Italy) (New Zealand)	Paolo Bertolucci / Adriano Panatta; Chris Lewis / Russell Simpson	6; 4	6; 4	3; 6	13; 11
4	(Italy) (New Zealand)	Adriano Panatta; Chris Lewis	4; 6	3; 6	2; 6
5	(Italy) (New Zealand)	Corrado Barazzutti; Bruce Derlin	6; 2	6; 3

=== 1983 ===
1983 Davis Cup World Group First Round

Italy
3
Reggio Calabria, Italy
4–6 March 1983
Clay

Ireland
2

			1	2	3	4	5
1	(Italy) (Republic of Ireland)	Claudio Panatta; Sean Sorensen	6; 1	4; 6	4; 6	1; 6
2	(Italy) (Republic of Ireland)	Corrado Barazzutti; Matt Doyle	6; 4	6; 3	6; 1
3	(Italy) (Republic of Ireland)	Paolo Bertolucci / Adriano Panatta; Matt Doyle / Sean Sorensen	3; 6	6; 2	6; 2	6; 4
4	(Italy) (Republic of Ireland)	Claudio Panatta; Matt Doyle	6; 1	3; 6	4; 6	4; 6
5	(Italy) (Republic of Ireland)	Corrado Barazzutti; Sean Sorensen	6; 0	6; 3	6; 3

1983 Davis Cup World Group Quarterfinals

Italy
0
Foro Italico, Rome, Italy
8–10 July 1983
Clay

Argentina
5

			1	2	3	4	5
1	(Italy) (Argentina)	Adriano Panatta; Guillermo Vilas	2; 6	2; 6	1; 6
2	(Italy) (Argentina)	Corrado Barazzutti; José Luis Clerc	10; 12	2; 6	9; 7	6; 3	4; 6
3	(Italy) (Argentina)	Paolo Bertolucci / Adriano Panatta; José Luis Clerc / Guillermo Vilas	5; 7	3; 6	4; 6
4	(Italy) (Argentina)	Corrado Barazzutti; Guillermo Vilas	3; 6	1; 6
5	(Italy) (Argentina)	Francesco Cancellotti; Roberto Argüello	5; 7	4; 6

=== 1984 ===
1984 Davis Cup World Group First Round

Great Britain
2
Racquet Centre, Telford, United Kingdom
24–26 February 1984
Carpet (indoors)

Italy
3

			1	2	3	4	5
1	(United Kingdom) (Italy)	Colin Dowdeswell; Gianni Ocleppo	6; 1	2; 6	7; 9	2; 6
2	(United Kingdom) (Italy)	John Lloyd; Corrado Barazzutti	6; 4	3; 6	6; 2	6; 3
3	(United Kingdom) (Italy)	Colin Dowdeswell / John Lloyd; Gianni Ocleppo / Claudio Panatta	11; 9	6; 4	3; 6	3; 6	6; 3
4	(United Kingdom) (Italy)	John Lloyd; Gianni Ocleppo	6; 2	2; 6	3; 6	3; 6
5	(United Kingdom) (Italy)	Colin Dowdeswell; Corrado Barazzutti	1; 6	6; 0	3; 6	5; 7

1984 Davis Cup World Group Quarterfinals

Australia
5
Milton Courts, Brisbane, Australia
13–15 July 1984
Grass

Italy
0

			1	2	3	4	5
1	(Australia) (Italy)	John Fitzgerald; Gianni Ocleppo	6; 3	6; 1	4; 6	6; 1
2	(Australia) (Italy)	Pat Cash; Claudio Panatta	6; 3	3; 6	6; 3	6; 4
3	(Australia) (Italy)	Mark Edmondson / Paul McNamee; Gianni Ocleppo / Claudio Panatta	3; 6	7; 5	6; 4	6; 3
4	(Australia) (Italy)	John Fitzgerald; Claudio Panatta	6; 4	8; 10	6; 2
5	(Australia) (Italy)	Pat Cash; Gianni Ocleppo	9; 7	6; 4

=== 1985 ===
1985 Davis Cup World Group First Round

India
3
Calcutta, India
8–10 March 1985
Grass

Italy
2

			1	2	3	4	5
1	(India) (Italy)	Ramesh Krishnan; Francesco Cancellotti	6; 3	11; 9	4; 6	3; 6	6; 4
2	(India) (Italy)	Vijay Amritraj; Claudio Panatta	6; 1	6; 4	5; 7	3; 6	6; 3
3	(India) (Italy)	Anand Amritraj / Sashi Menon; Gianni Ocleppo / Claudio Panatta	3; 6	3; 6	7; 9
4	(India) (Italy)	Vijay Amritraj; Francesco Cancellotti	5; 7	6; 4	6; 3	8; 6
5	(India) (Italy)	Ramesh Krishnan; Claudio Panatta	8; 6	4; 6	1; 6

1985 Davis Cup World Group Playoff

Italy
3
Tennis Club Cagliari, Cagliari, Italy
4–6 October 1985
Clay

Chile
1

			1	2	3	4	5
1	(Italy) (Chile)	Claudio Panatta; José Antonio Fernández	6; 2	7; 5	6; 1
2	(Italy) (Chile)	Francesco Cancellotti; Ricardo Acuña	3; 6	2; 6	6; 4	6; 2	5; 7
3	(Italy) (Chile)	Gianni Ocleppo / Claudio Panatta; Ricardo Acuña / Juan Pablo Queirolo	6; 4	6; 2	6; 4
4	(Italy) (Chile)	Francesco Cancellotti; José Antonio Fernández	6; 1	7; 5	6; 2
5	(Italy) (Chile)	Claudio Panatta; Ricardo Acuña						not played

=== 1986 ===
1986 Davis Cup World Group First Round

Italy
4
Palermo, Italy
7–9 March 1986
Clay

Paraguay
1

			1	2	3	4	5
1	(Italy) (Paraguay)	Francesco Cancellotti; Hugo Chapacú	6; 4	6; 3	6; 1
2	(Italy) (Paraguay)	Claudio Panatta; Víctor Pecci	4; 6	11; 9	9; 7	10; 8
3	(Italy) (Paraguay)	Gianni Ocleppo / Claudio Panatta; Francisco González / Víctor Pecci	6; 4	1; 6	4; 6	5; 7
4	(Italy) (Paraguay)	Claudio Panatta; Hugo Chapacú	6; 3	7; 5	6; 3
5	(Italy) (Paraguay)	Francesco Cancellotti; Víctor Pecci	5; 7	1; 0				retired

1986 Davis Cup World Group Quarterfinals

Sweden
5
Båstad Tennis Stadium, Båstad, Sweden
18–20 July 1986
Clay

Italy
0

			1	2	3	4	5
1	(Sweden) (Italy)	Mats Wilander; Paolo Canè	6; 8	6; 2	6; 3	6; 4
2	(Sweden) (Italy)	Joakim Nyström; Claudio Panatta	6; 2	6; 3	6; 1
3	(Sweden) (Italy)	Joakim Nyström / Mats Wilander; Paolo Canè / Claudio Panatta	6; 4	7; 5	6; 2
4	(Sweden) (Italy)	Stefan Edberg; Paolo Canè	6; 3	2; 6	6; 0
5	(Sweden) (Italy)	Mats Wilander; Claudio Panatta	6; 4	6; 3

=== 1987 ===
1987 Davis Cup World Group First Round

Italy
2
Tennis Club Prato, Prato, Italy
13–15 March 1987
Clay

Sweden
3

			1	2	3	4	5
1	(Italy) (Sweden)	Paolo Canè; Mikael Pernfors	1; 6	6; 2	6; 3	6; 4
2	(Italy) (Sweden)	Simone Colombo; Mats Wilander	2; 6	3; 6	0; 6
3	(Italy) (Sweden)	Paolo Canè / Simone Colombo; Anders Järryd / Mats Wilander	1; 6	2; 6	2; 6
4	(Italy) (Sweden)	Simone Colombo; Anders Järryd	3; 6	4; 6	6; 4	5; 7
5	(Italy) (Sweden)	Paolo Canè; Mats Wilander	6; 3	2; 6	7; 5

1987 Davis Cup World Group Playoff

South Korea
2
Seoul, South Korea
24–26 July 1987
Hard

Italy
3

			1	2	3	4	5
1	(South Korea) (Italy)	Song Dong-wook; Paolo Canè	10; 8	3; 6	6; 4	6; 4
2	(South Korea) (Italy)	Yoo Jin-sun; Claudio Panatta	6; 2	4; 6	4; 6	9; 7	10; 12
3	(South Korea) (Italy)	Song Dong-wook / Yoo Jin-sun; Paolo Canè / Simone Colombo	2; 6	4; 6	4; 6
4	(South Korea) (Italy)	Song Dong-wook; Claudio Panatta	6; 1	6; 8	3; 6	6; 2	6; 2
5	(South Korea) (Italy)	Kim Bong-soo; Paolo Canè	3; 6	1; 6	6; 8

=== 1988 ===
1988 Davis Cup World Group First Round

Italy
4
Palermo, Italy
5–7 February 1988
Clay

Israel
1

			1	2	3	4	5
1	(Italy) (Israel)	Francesco Cancellotti; Gilad Bloom	6; 1	6; 2	6; 8	6; 4
2	(Italy) (Israel)	Paolo Canè; Amos Mansdorf	7; 5	6; 3	6; 2
3	(Italy) (Israel)	Paolo Canè / Diego Nargiso; Amos Mansdorf / Shahar Perkiss	5; 7	3; 6	4; 6
4	(Italy) (Israel)	Paolo Canè; Gilad Bloom	4; 6	6; 1	6; 1	6; 0
5	(Italy) (Israel)	Francesco Cancellotti; Amos Mansdorf	6; 4	6; 2

1988 Davis Cup World Group Quarterfinals

Yugoslavia
4
Belgrade, Yugoslavia
8–10 April 1988
Carpet (indoors)

Italy
1

			1	2	3	4	5
1	(Socialist Federal Republic of Yugoslavia) (Italy)	Bruno Orešar; Paolo Canè	1; 6	1; 6	3; 6
2	(Socialist Federal Republic of Yugoslavia) (Italy)	Slobodan Živojinović; Francesco Cancellotti	6; 4	9; 7	6; 3
3	(Socialist Federal Republic of Yugoslavia) (Italy)	Goran Prpić / Slobodan Živojinović; Paolo Canè / Simone Colombo	6; 4	6; 2	3; 6	6; 3
4	(Socialist Federal Republic of Yugoslavia) (Italy)	Bruno Orešar; Francesco Cancellotti	5; 7	3; 6	6; 3	6; 1	7; 5
5	(Socialist Federal Republic of Yugoslavia) (Italy)	Slobodan Živojinović; Paolo Canè	6; 4	6; 4

=== 1989 ===
1989 Davis Cup World Group Quarterfinals

Sweden
4
Baltiska Hallen, Malmö, Sweden
3–5 February 1989
Carpet (indoors)

Italy
1

			1	2	3	4	5
1	(Sweden) (Italy)	Jonas Svensson; Massimiliano Narducci	4; 6	6; 3	6; 1	4; 6	6; 3
2	(Sweden) (Italy)	Mikael Pernfors; Omar Camporese	5; 7	3; 6	2; 6
3	(Sweden) (Italy)	Jan Gunnarsson / Anders Järryd; Omar Camporese / Diego Nargiso	7^{8} 6^{6}	7; 5	6; 4
4	(Sweden) (Italy)	Mikael Pernfors; Massimiliano Narducci	6; 3	6; 4	4; 6	6^{2} 7^{7}	6; 3
5	(Sweden) (Italy)	Jonas Svensson; Omar Camporese	6; 3	3; 6	6; 3

1989 Davis Cup World Group Playoff

Denmark
1
Aarhus Idrætspark, Aarhus, Denmark
21–23 July 1989
Carpet (indoors)

Italy
4

			1	2	3	4	5
1	(Denmark) (Italy)	Michael Tauson; Diego Nargiso	6; 4	4; 6	1; 6	3; 6
2	(Denmark) (Italy)	Morten Christensen; Omar Camporese	6; 4	4; 6	6; 3	2; 6	6; 8
3	(Denmark) (Italy)	Peter Flintsø / Michael Mortensen; Omar Camporese / Diego Nargiso	5; 7	6^{3} 7^{7}	4; 6
4	(Denmark) (Italy)	Peter Flintsø; Omar Camporese	6^{2} 7^{7}	1; 6
5	(Denmark) (Italy)	Morten Christensen; Claudio Pistolesi	6; 4	7; 5

== 1990s ==
=== 1990 ===
1990 Davis Cup World Group First Round

Italy
3
Tennis Club Cagliari, Cagliari, Italy
2–5 February 1990
Clay

Sweden
2

			1	2	3	4	5
1	(Italy) (Sweden)	Paolo Canè; Jonas Svensson	3; 6	2; 6	6; 3	6; 3	6; 1
2	(Italy) (Sweden)	Omar Camporese; Mats Wilander	4; 6	4; 6	7; 5	7^{7} 6^{1}	4; 6
3	(Italy) (Sweden)	Paolo Canè / Diego Nargiso; Jan Gunnarsson / Anders Järryd	7; 5	6; 1	7; 5
4	(Italy) (Sweden)	Omar Camporese; Jonas Svensson	7^{7} 6^{2}	1; 6	3; 6	1; 6
5	(Italy) (Sweden)	Paolo Canè; Mats Wilander	6; 4	3; 6	4; 6	7; 5	7; 5

1990 Davis Cup World Group Quarterfinals

Austria
5
Ferry-Dusika-Hallenstadion, Vienna, Austria
30 March–1 April 1990
Clay (indoors)

Italy
0

			1	2	3	4	5
1	(Austria) (Italy)	Horst Skoff; Diego Nargiso	6; 0	6; 0	6; 2
2	(Austria) (Italy)	Thomas Muster; Paolo Canè	7; 5	7; 5	1; 6	4; 6	6; 3
3	(Austria) (Italy)	Alex Antonitsch / Thomas Muster; Paolo Canè / Diego Nargiso	7^{7} 6^{4}	1; 6	6; 2	6; 2
4	(Austria) (Italy)	Horst Skoff; Claudio Pistolesi	6; 4	6; 1
5	(Austria) (Italy)	Thomas Muster; Diego Nargiso	6; 3	6; 2

=== 1991 ===
1991 Davis Cup World Group First Round

Germany
3
Westfalenhallen, Dortmund, Germany
1–3 February 1991
Carpet (indoors)

Italy
2

			1	2	3	4	5
1	(Germany) (Italy)	Boris Becker; Paolo Canè	3; 6	6; 1	6; 4	6; 4
2	(Germany) (Italy)	Michael Stich; Omar Camporese	6^{2} 7^{7}	1; 6	3; 6
3	(Germany) (Italy)	Boris Becker / Eric Jelen; Omar Camporese / Diego Nargiso	6; 4	4; 6	6^{6} 7^{8}	6; 4	3; 6
4	(Germany) (Italy)	Boris Becker; Omar Camporese	3; 6	4; 6	6; 3	6; 4	6; 3
5	(Germany) (Italy)	Michael Stich; Paolo Canè	7^{7} 6^{4}	6^{1} 7^{7}	7; 5	6; 1

1991 Davis Cup World Group Playoff

Italy
4
Bari Tennis Club, Bari, Italy
20–22 September 1991
Clay

Denmark
1

			1	2	3	4	5
1	(Italy) (Denmark)	Omar Camporese; Frederik Fetterlein	6; 3	3; 6	2; 6	4; 6
2	(Italy) (Denmark)	Claudio Pistolesi; Michael Tauson	6; 1	6; 2	7^{7} 6^{4}
3	(Italy) (Denmark)	Omar Camporese / Diego Nargiso; Frederik Fetterlein / Michael Tauson	6; 3	6; 3	6; 4
4	(Italy) (Denmark)	Omar Camporese; Michael Tauson	7^{7} 6^{5}	6; 1	6; 2
5	(Italy) (Denmark)	Claudio Pistolesi; Frederik Fetterlein	7^{7} 6^{3}	6; 3

=== 1992 ===
1992 Davis Cup World Group First Round

Italy
4
Palasport, Bolzano, Italy
31 January–2 February 1992
Carpet (indoors)

Spain
1

			1	2	3	4	5
1	(Italy) (Spain)	Omar Camporese; Sergi Bruguera	6; 4	6; 1	4; 6	6; 1
2	(Italy) (Spain)	Cristiano Caratti; Emilio Sánchez	6^{3} 7^{7}	6; 4	6; 3	5; 7	5; 7
3	(Italy) (Spain)	Omar Camporese / Diego Nargiso; Sergio Casal / Emilio Sánchez	7^{7} 6^{4}	6; 3	6; 4
4	(Italy) (Spain)	Omar Camporese; Emilio Sánchez	6; 0	6; 2	6; 4
5	(Italy) (Spain)	Cristiano Caratti; Sergi Bruguera	6; 4	6^{8} 7^{10}	6; 1

1992 Davis Cup World Group Quarterfinals

Brazil
3
Tennis Park, Maceió, Brazil
27–29 March 1992
Clay

Italy
1

			1	2	3	4	5
1	(Brazil) (Italy)	Luiz Mattar; Omar Camporese	3; 6	7; 5	4; 6	7^{11} 6^{9}	4; 6
2	(Brazil) (Italy)	Jaime Oncins; Paolo Canè	7^{7} 6^{4}	4; 6	5; 7	7; 5	6; 3
3	(Brazil) (Italy)	Cássio Motta / Fernando Roese; Omar Camporese / Diego Nargiso	6; 1	6; 2	5; 7	3; 6	6; 3
4	(Brazil) (Italy)	Jaime Oncins; Stefano Pescosolido	6; 4	6; 3	3; 6	1; 0		retired
5	(Brazil) (Italy)	Luiz Mattar; Paolo Canè						not played

=== 1993 ===
1993 Davis Cup World Group First Round

Italy
4
Palasport Modena, Modena, Italy
26–28 March 1993
Carpet (indoors)

Brazil
1

			1	2	3	4	5
1	(Italy) (Brazil)	Diego Nargiso; Jaime Oncins	7; 5	6; 2	6; 3
2	(Italy) (Brazil)	Omar Camporese; Luiz Mattar	7^{7} 6^{4}	4; 6	6; 2	6; 1
3	(Italy) (Brazil)	Omar Camporese / Diego Nargiso; Cássio Motta / Fernando Roese	7^{9} 6^{7}	3; 6	4; 6	6; 3	10; 8
4	(Italy) (Brazil)	Omar Camporese; Jaime Oncins	4; 6	6; 3	3; 6
5	(Italy) (Brazil)	Diego Nargiso; Cássio Motta	6; 1	6; 2

1993 Davis Cup World Group Quarterfinals

Italy
2
Florence Tennis Club, Florence, Italy
16–18 July 1993
Clay

Australia
3

			1	2	3	4	5
1	(Italy) (Australia)	Renzo Furlan; Richard Fromberg	6^{5} 7^{7}	6^{3} 7^{7}	4; 6
2	(Italy) (Australia)	Stefano Pescosolido; Mark Woodforde	6; 3	7; 5	5; 7	6; 4
3	(Italy) (Australia)	Paolo Canè / Diego Nargiso; Todd Woodbridge / Mark Woodforde	7^{8} 6^{6}	6^{5} 7^{7}	2; 6	3; 6
4	(Italy) (Australia)	Paolo Canè; Mark Woodforde	6; 2	1; 6	7; 5	6; 4
5	(Italy) (Australia)	Stefano Pescosolido; Richard Fromberg	6^{3} 7^{7}	1; 6	4; 6

=== 1994 ===
1994 Davis Cup World Group First Round

Spain
4
Club de Campo Villa de Madrid, Madrid, Spain
25–27 March 1994
Clay

Italy
1

			1	2	3	4	5
1	(Spain) (Italy)	Sergi Bruguera; Andrea Gaudenzi	6; 3	7; 5	6; 1
2	(Spain) (Italy)	Carlos Costa; Stefano Pescosolido	6; 4	6; 4	1; 6	4; 6	2; 6
3	(Spain) (Italy)	Sergi Bruguera / Tomás Carbonell; Paolo Canè / Diego Nargiso	6; 3	3; 6	6; 1	6; 1
4	(Spain) (Italy)	Sergi Bruguera; Stefano Pescosolido	6; 4	1; 6	0; 6	6; 2	6; 3
5	(Spain) (Italy)	Alberto Berasategui; Andrea Gaudenzi	7; 5	6; 3

1994 Davis Cup World Group Playoff

Hungary
1
Romai Tennis Academy, Budapest, Hungary
23–25 September 1994
Clay

Italy
4

			1	2	3	4	5
1	(Hungary) (Italy)	József Krocskó; Andrea Gaudenzi	2; 6	6; 4	3; 6	3; 6
2	(Hungary) (Italy)	Sándor Noszály; Renzo Furlan	6^{6} 7^{8}	2; 6	7^{7} 6^{5}	1; 6
3	(Hungary) (Italy)	Gábor Köves / László Markovits; Cristian Brandi / Stefano Pescosolido	2; 6	6; 4	4; 6	7^{7} 6^{5}	7; 9
4	(Hungary) (Italy)	Sándor Noszály; Andrea Gaudenzi	1; 6	3; 6
5	(Hungary) (Italy)	József Krocskó; Renzo Furlan	2; 6	7; 5	6; 1

=== 1995 ===
1995 Davis Cup World Group First Round

Italy
4
Tennis Club Napoli, Naples, Italy
3–5 February 1995
Clay

Czech Republic
1

			1	2	3	4	5
1	(Italy) (Czech Republic)	Andrea Gaudenzi; Daniel Vacek	6^{5} 7^{7}	4; 6	6; 1	6^{4} 7^{7}
2	(Italy) (Czech Republic)	Renzo Furlan; Ctislav Doseděl	4; 6	7^{7} 6^{3}	6; 4	6; 4
3	(Italy) (Czech Republic)	Cristian Brandi / Stefano Pescosolido; Martin Damm / Cyril Suk	6; 2	1; 6	7^{7} 6^{3}	7^{7} 6^{2}
4	(Italy) (Czech Republic)	Andrea Gaudenzi; Ctislav Doseděl	6; 3	6; 2	4; 6	6; 2
5	(Italy) (Czech Republic)	Renzo Furlan; Daniel Vacek	3; 6	7^{8} 6^{6}	6; 2

1995 Davis Cup World Group Quarterfinals

Italy
0
Tennis Club Palermo, Palermo, Italy
31 March–2 April 1995
Clay

United States
5

			1	2	3	4	5
1	(Italy) (United States)	Andrea Gaudenzi; Andre Agassi	4; 6	4; 6	1; 6
2	(Italy) (United States)	Renzo Furlan; Pete Sampras	6^{3} 7^{7}	3; 6	0; 6
3	(Italy) (United States)	Cristian Brandi / Stefano Pescosolido; Jared Palmer / Richey Reneberg	1; 6	7^{7} 6^{2}	4; 6	3; 6
4	(Italy) (United States)	Andrea Gaudenzi; Pete Sampras	3; 6	6; 1	3; 6
5	(Italy) (United States)	Renzo Furlan; Jared Palmer	4; 6	3; 6

=== 1996 ===
1996 Davis Cup World Group First Round

Italy
3
Foro Italico, Rome, Italy
9–11 February 1996
Clay

Russia
2

			1	2	3	4	5
1	(Italy) (Russia)	Andrea Gaudenzi; Andrei Chesnokov	2; 6	6^{5} 7^{7}	7^{7} 6^{5}	6; 3	6; 1
2	(Italy) (Russia)	Renzo Furlan; Yevgeny Kafelnikov	3; 6	7; 5	4; 6	3; 6
3	(Italy) (Russia)	Andrea Gaudenzi / Diego Nargiso; Yevgeny Kafelnikov / Andrei Olhovskiy	6; 4	2; 6	5; 7	7^{7} 6^{4}	6; 4
4	(Italy) (Russia)	Andrea Gaudenzi; Yevgeny Kafelnikov	3; 6	6; 3	6^{4} 7^{7}	5; 7
5	(Italy) (Russia)	Renzo Furlan; Andrei Chesnokov	6; 0	3; 6	6; 3	7; 5

1996 Davis Cup World Group Quarterfinals

Italy
4
Foro Italico, Rome, Italy
5–7 April 1996
Clay

South Africa
1

			1	2	3	4	5
1	(Italy) (South Africa)	Renzo Furlan; Marcos Ondruska	4; 6	4; 6	4; 6
2	(Italy) (South Africa)	Andrea Gaudenzi; Wayne Ferreira	5; 7	6; 3	2; 6	7; 5	6; 1
3	(Italy) (South Africa)	Andrea Gaudenzi / Diego Nargiso; Ellis Ferreira / Wayne Ferreira	5; 7	3; 6	6; 3	7^{9} 6^{7}	6; 2
4	(Italy) (South Africa)	Renzo Furlan; Wayne Ferreira	3; 6	6; 0	7^{7} 6^{4}	6; 2
5	(Italy) (South Africa)	Andrea Gaudenzi; Marcos Ondruska	6; 1	1; 1				retired

1996 Davis Cup World Group Semifinals

France
3
Palais des Sports de Beaulieu, Nantes, France
20–22 September 1996
Carpet (indoors)

Italy
2

			1	2	3	4	5
1	(France) (Italy)	Cédric Pioline; Andrea Gaudenzi	7; 5	1; 6	6^{4} 7^{7}	3; 6
2	(France) (Italy)	Arnaud Boetsch; Renzo Furlan	5; 7	6; 1	3; 6	6^{5} 7^{7}
3	(France) (Italy)	Guy Forget / Guillaume Raoux; Andrea Gaudenzi / Diego Nargiso	6; 3	6; 4	6; 2
4	(France) (Italy)	Cédric Pioline; Renzo Furlan	6; 3	2; 6	6; 2	6; 4
5	(France) (Italy)	Arnaud Boetsch; Andrea Gaudenzi	6; 4	6; 2	7^{10} 6^{8}

=== 1997 ===
1997 Davis Cup World Group First Round

Italy
4
Foro Italico, Rome, Italy
7–9 February 1997
Clay

Mexico
1

			1	2	3	4	5
1	(Italy) (Mexico)	Omar Camporese; Alejandro Hernández	2; 6	6; 0	6; 4	7; 5
2	(Italy) (Mexico)	Renzo Furlan; Luis Herrera	3; 6	6; 1	6; 2	6; 1
3	(Italy) (Mexico)	Diego Nargiso / Stefano Pescosolido; Alejandro Hernández / Leonardo Lavalle	6; 1	4; 6	7^{9} 6^{7}	6; 3
4	(Italy) (Mexico)	Renzo Furlan; Alejandro Hernández	6; 2	6; 3
5	(Italy) (Mexico)	Omar Camporese; Luis Herrera	6; 2	3; 6	4; 6

1997 Davis Cup World Group Quarterfinals

Italy
4
Palazzo dello Sport, Pesaro, Italy
4–6 April 1997
Carpet (indoors)

Spain
1

			1	2	3	4	5
1	(Italy) (Spain)	Omar Camporese; Carlos Moyá	6^{8} 7^{10}	6^{4} 7^{7}	6; 1	6; 3	6; 3
2	(Italy) (Spain)	Renzo Furlan; Albert Costa	4; 6	6; 3	4; 6	6; 4	6; 1
3	(Italy) (Spain)	Omar Camporese / Diego Nargiso; Francisco Roig / Javier Sánchez	5; 7	7^{7} 6^{0}	6; 2	7^{7} 6^{5}
4	(Italy) (Spain)	Marzio Martelli; Carlos Moyá	6^{5} 7^{7}	6; 4	3; 6
5	(Italy) (Spain)	Omar Camporese; Albert Costa	6; 2	3; 6	6; 4

1997 Davis Cup World Group Semifinals

Sweden
4
Himmelstalundshallen, Norrköping, Sweden
19–21 September 1997
Carpet (indoors)

Italy
1

			1	2	3	4	5
1	(Sweden) (Italy)	Jonas Björkman; Omar Camporese	6^{5} 7^{7}	6; 3	6; 2	3; 6	6; 3
2	(Sweden) (Italy)	Thomas Enqvist; Renzo Furlan	6; 3	3; 6	4; 6	6; 3	3; 6
3	(Sweden) (Italy)	Jonas Björkman / Nicklas Kulti; Omar Camporese / Diego Nargiso	6; 1	6; 1	6; 2
4	(Sweden) (Italy)	Jonas Björkman; Renzo Furlan	4; 6	6; 4	6; 0	6; 4
5	(Sweden) (Italy)	Thomas Enqvist; Omar Camporese	6; 3	6^{5} 7^{7}	6; 3

=== 1998 ===
1998 Davis Cup World Group First Round

Italy
4
Centro Sportivo Valletta Cambiaso, Genova, Italy
3–5 April 1998
Clay

India
1

			1	2	3	4	5
1	(Italy) (India)	Andrea Gaudenzi; Srinath Prahlad	6; 0	6; 2	1; 6	6; 2
2	(Italy) (India)	Davide Sanguinetti; Mahesh Bhupathi	4; 6	4; 6	4; 6
3	(Italy) (India)	Andrea Gaudenzi / Diego Nargiso; Mahesh Bhupathi / Fazaluddin Syed	6; 3	6; 4	3; 6	6; 3
4	(Italy) (India)	Andrea Gaudenzi; Mahesh Bhupathi	6; 1	7^{7} 6^{3}	6; 1
5	(Italy) (India)	Davide Sanguinetti; Srinath Prahlad	6; 2	6; 3

1998 Davis Cup World Group Quarterfinals

Italy
5
Tennis Club Prato, Prato, Italy
17–19 July 1998
Clay

Zimbabwe
0

			1	2	3	4	5
1	(Italy) (Zimbabwe)	Andrea Gaudenzi; Wayne Black	6; 3	6; 3	6; 4
2	(Italy) (Zimbabwe)	Davide Sanguinetti; Byron Black	6; 3	6; 3	6; 0
3	(Italy) (Zimbabwe)	Andrea Gaudenzi / Diego Nargiso; Byron Black / Wayne Black	1; 6	7; 5	7; 5	6; 3
4	(Italy) (Zimbabwe)	Diego Nargiso; Genius Chidzikwe	6; 0	6; 2
5	(Italy) (Zimbabwe)	Davide Sanguinetti; Wayne Black	6; 4	3; 6	6; 3

1998 Davis Cup World Group Semifinals

United States
1
Wisconsin Center Arena, Milwaukee, WI, United States
25–27 September 1998
Hard (indoors)

Italy
4

			1	2	3	4	5
1	(United States) (Italy)	Jan-Michael Gambill; Andrea Gaudenzi	2; 6	6; 0	6^{0} 7^{7}	6^{4} 7^{7}
2	(United States) (Italy)	Todd Martin; Davide Sanguinetti	6^{0} 7^{7}	3; 6	6^{8} 7^{10}
3	(United States) (Italy)	Justin Gimelstob / Todd Martin; Andrea Gaudenzi / Diego Nargiso	4; 6	6^{3} 7^{7}	7; 5	6; 2	3; 6
4	(United States) (Italy)	Justin Gimelstob; Gianluca Pozzi	6^{4} 7^{7}	5; 7
5	(United States) (Italy)	Jan-Michael Gambill; Davide Sanguinetti	4; 6	6; 3	6; 3

1998 Davis Cup World Group Final

Italy
1
Forum di Assago, Milan, Italy
4–6 December 1998
Clay (indoors)

Sweden
4

			1	2	3	4	5
1	(Italy) (Sweden)	Andrea Gaudenzi; Magnus Norman	7^{11} 6^{9}	6^{0} 7^{7}	6; 4	3; 6	6; 6	retired
2	(Italy) (Sweden)	Davide Sanguinetti; Magnus Gustafsson	1; 6	4; 6	0; 6
3	(Italy) (Sweden)	Diego Nargiso / Davide Sanguinetti; Jonas Björkman / Nicklas Kulti	6^{1} 7^{7}	1; 6	3; 6
4	(Italy) (Sweden)	Gianluca Pozzi; Magnus Gustafsson	4; 6	2; 6
5	(Italy) (Sweden)	Diego Nargiso; Magnus Norman	6; 2	6; 3

=== 1999 ===
1999 Davis Cup World Group First Round

Switzerland
3
Patinoire du Littoral, Neuchâtel, Switzerland
2–4 April 1999
Carpet (indoors)

Italy
2

			1	2	3	4	5
1	(Switzerland) (Italy)	Marc Rosset; Gianluca Pozzi	7^{7} 6^{2}	6; 4	7^{7} 6^{0}
2	(Switzerland) (Italy)	Roger Federer; Davide Sanguinetti	6; 4	6^{3} 7^{7}	6; 3	6; 4
3	(Switzerland) (Italy)	Lorenzo Manta / Marc Rosset; Stefano Pescosolido / Laurence Tieleman	7^{7} 6^{4}	4; 6	7; 5	6; 3
4	(Switzerland) (Italy)	Ivo Heuberger; Davide Sanguinetti	3; 6	6; 3	6^{8} 7^{10}
5	(Switzerland) (Italy)	Roger Federer; Gianluca Pozzi	4; 6	6^{4} 7^{7}

1999 Davis Cup World Group Playoff

Italy
3
Torres Tennis Sassari, Sassari, Italy
24–26 September 1999
Clay

Finland
2

			1	2	3	4	5
1	(Italy) (Finland)	Andrea Gaudenzi; Jarkko Nieminen	6; 2	6; 3	7; 5
2	(Italy) (Finland)	Davide Sanguinetti; Ville Liukko	3; 6	6; 1	6^{2} 7^{7}	6; 4	3; 6
3	(Italy) (Finland)	Andrea Gaudenzi / Diego Nargiso; Tuomas Ketola / Ville Liukko	6; 1	4; 6	4; 6	6; 4	2; 6
4	(Italy) (Finland)	Andrea Gaudenzi; Ville Liukko	6; 3	6^{5} 7^{7}	2; 6	6; 1	6; 3
5	(Italy) (Finland)	Davide Sanguinetti; Tuomas Ketola	6; 2	6; 2	1; 6	6; 1

== See also ==
- Italy Davis Cup team results (1922–1949)
- Italy Davis Cup team results (1950–1969)
- Italy Davis Cup team results (2000–present)
