= 1972 Davis Cup Europe Zone =

International tennis competition

The Europe Zone was one of the three regional zones of the 1972 Davis Cup.

33 teams entered the Europe Zone, competing across 2 sub-zones. The winners of each sub-zone went on to compete in the Inter-Zonal Zone against the winners of the Americas Zone and Eastern Zone.

Romania defeated the Soviet Union in the Zone A final, and Spain defeated Czechoslovakia in the Zone B final, resulting in both Romania and Spain progressing to the Inter-Zonal Zone.

== Zone A ==
=== Draw ===
Preliminary round 21–23 April
Tel Aviv, Israel (hard)
Israel	1
Iran	4

First Round; 1–13 May
Bucharest, Romania (clay)
Romania	5
Switzerland	0
Tehran, Iran
Iran	4
Egypt	1
Reggio Calabria, Italy (clay)
Italy	5
Austria	0
Scheveningen, Netherlands (clay)
Netherlands	5
Norway	0
Helsinki, Finland (clay)
Finland	2
Denmark	3
Warsaw, Poland
Poland	3
Yugoslavia	1
Beirut, Lebanon (clay)
Lebanon	0
Morocco	5
Tbilisi, Soviet Union
Soviet Union	3
Hungary	2

Quarterfinals; 18–22 May
Bucharest, Romania (clay)
Romania	5
Iran	0
San Benedetto del Tronto, Italy (clay)
Italy	4
Netherlands	1
Copenhagen, Denmark (clay)
Denmark	0
Poland	5
Casablanca, Morocco
Morocco	0
Soviet Union	5

Semifinals; 9–18 June
Bucharest, Romania (clay)
Romania	4
Italy	1
Warsaw, Poland
Poland	0
Soviet Union	4

Final; 21–23 July
Tbilisi, Soviet Union
Romania	3
Soviet Union	2

=== Preliminary round ===
Israel vs. Iran

Israel
1
Tel Aviv, Israel
21–23 April 1972
Hard

Iran
4

			1	2	3	4	5
1	(Israel) (Iran)	Josef Stabholz; Hussain Akbari	2; 6	4; 6	7; 9
2	(Israel) (Iran)	Yehoshua Shalem; Taghi Akbari	1; 6	1; 6	4; 6
3	(Israel) (Iran)	Josef Stabholz / Yair Wertheimer; Hussain Akbari / Nematollah Nemati	6; 2	6; 3	2; 6	6; 3
4	(Israel) (Iran)	Yehoshua Shalem; Hussain Akbari	5; 7	9; 7	5; 7	6; 2	3; 6
5	(Israel) (Iran)	Josef Stabholz; Taghi Akbari	3; 6	2; 6	0; 6

=== First round ===
Romania vs. Switzerland

Romania
5
Bucharest, Romania
5–7 May 1972
Clay

Switzerland
0

			1	2	3	4	5
1	(Romania) (Switzerland)	Ion Țiriac; Matthias Werren	6; 1	6; 2	6; 2
2	(Romania) (Switzerland)	Ilie Năstase; Michel Burgener	6; 1	6; 2	6; 2
3	(Romania) (Switzerland)	Ilie Năstase / Ion Țiriac; Freddy Blatter / Matthias Werren	6; 0	6; 4	4; 6	6; 1
4	(Romania) (Switzerland)	Petre Mărmureanu; Freddy Blatter	6; 2	6; 2	6; 1
5	(Romania) (Switzerland)	Ion Țiriac; Michel Burgener	6; 3	6; 2	2; 6	6; 0

Iran vs. Egypt

Iran
4
Tehran, Iran
11–13 May 1972

Egypt
1

			1	2	3	4	5
1	(Iran) (Egypt)	Taghi Akbari; Ibrahim Mahmoud	6; 1	6; 4	10; 8
2	(Iran) (Egypt)	Hussain Akbari; Aly El Dawoudi	6; 3	6; 3	6; 4
3	(Iran) (Egypt)	Taghi Akbari / Issa Khodaei; Aly El Dawoudi / Ibrahim Mahmoud	6; 4	6; 2	4; 6	8; 6
4	(Iran) (Egypt)	Taghi Akbari; Aly El Dawoudi	8; 6	4; 6	6; 8	8; 6	3; 6
5	(Iran) (Egypt)	Hussain Akbari; Ibrahim Mahmoud	4; 6	7; 5	6; 3	6; 0

Italy vs. Austria

Italy
5
Reggio Calabria, Italy
5–7 May 1972
Clay

Austria
0

			1	2	3	4	5
1	(Italy) (Austria)	Corrado Barazzutti; Ernst Blanke	6; 2	0; 6	6; 1	6; 3
2	(Italy) (Austria)	Paolo Bertolucci; Hans Kary	6; 3	6; 1	6; 3
3	(Italy) (Austria)	Adriano Panatta / Nicola Pietrangeli; Ernst Blanke / Rudolf Hoskowetz	6; 3	6; 4	6; 4
4	(Italy) (Austria)	Corrado Barazzutti; Hans Kary	6; 8	6; 4	4; 6	6; 3	6; 4
5	(Italy) (Austria)	Paolo Bertolucci; Rudolf Hoskowetz	6; 4	6; 2	6; 3

Netherlands vs. Norway

Netherlands
5
Scheveningen, Netherlands
5–7 May 1972
Clay

Norway
0

			1	2	3	4	5
1	(Netherlands) (Norway)	Fred Hemmes; Jon-Erik Ross	6; 1	10; 8	6; 2
2	(Netherlands) (Norway)	Jan Hordijk; Frithjof Prydz	6; 0	6; 1	6; 0
3	(Netherlands) (Norway)	Fred Hemmes / Jan Hordijk; Finn Dag Jagge / Jon-Erik Ross	6; 1	6; 3	6; 3
4	(Netherlands) (Norway)	Fred Hemmes; Frithjof Prydz	6; 0	6; 2	6; 4
5	(Netherlands) (Norway)	Jan Hordijk; Jon-Erik Ross	6; 1	7; 5	6; 1

Finland vs. Denmark

Finland
2
Helsinki, Finland
5–7 May 1972
Clay

Denmark
3

			1	2	3	4	5
1	(Finland) (Denmark)	Pekka Säilä; Tom Christensen	6; 1	6; 3	6; 4
2	(Finland) (Denmark)	Matti Timonen; Carl-Edvard Hedelund	1; 6	2; 6	4; 6
3	(Finland) (Denmark)	Pekka Säilä / Matti Timonen; Tom Christensen / Knud-Erik Nielsen	2; 6	13; 11	4; 6	3; 6
4	(Finland) (Denmark)	Rauno Suominen; Tom Christensen	7; 9	1; 6	2; 6
5	(Finland) (Denmark)	Pekka Säilä; Carl-Edvard Hedelund	8; 6	6; 0	10; 8

Poland vs. Yugoslavia

Poland
3
Warsaw, Poland
4–7 May 1972

Yugoslavia
1

			1	2	3	4	5
1	(Poland) (Socialist Federal Republic of Yugoslavia)	Tadeusz Nowicki; Nikola Špear	4; 6	6; 3	6; 2	6; 2
2	(Poland) (Socialist Federal Republic of Yugoslavia)	Wieslaw Gasiorek; Boro Jovanović	3; 6	4; 6	3; 6
3	(Poland) (Socialist Federal Republic of Yugoslavia)	Wieslaw Gasiorek / Tadeusz Nowicki; Boro Jovanović / Nikola Špear	6; 4	7; 9	6; 2	6; 3
4	(Poland) (Socialist Federal Republic of Yugoslavia)	Wieslaw Gasiorek; Nikola Špear	6; 2	7; 5	5; 7	6; 4
5	(Poland) (Socialist Federal Republic of Yugoslavia)	Tadeusz Nowicki; Boro Jovanović	3; 6	3; 6				not completed

Lebanon vs. Morocco

Lebanon
0
Yarzeh Club, Beirut, Lebanon
1–3 May 1972
Clay

Morocco
5

			1	2	3	4	5
1	(Lebanon) (Morocco)	Khoder Issa; Omar Laimina	6; 2	6; 3	3; 6	4; 6	9; 11
2	(Lebanon) (Morocco)	Samir El Khoury; Ahmed Ben Omar	3; 6	0; 6	4; 6
3	(Lebanon) (Morocco)	Najdo Abou Hassoun / Samir El Khoury; Mohammed-Haibabi Bouchaib / Omar Laimina	6; 3	8; 10	3; 6	2; 6
4	(Lebanon) (Morocco)	Khoder Issa; Mohammed-Chinois El Achraoui	6; 1	5; 7	1; 6	2; 6
5	(Lebanon) (Morocco)	Samir El Khoury; Omar Laimina	0; 6	3; 6	4; 6

Soviet Union vs. Hungary

Soviet Union
3
Tbilisi, Soviet Union
5–8 May 1972

Hungary
2

			1	2	3	4	5
1	(Soviet Union) (Hungary)	Vladimir Korotkov; Péter Szőke	6; 4	3; 6	2; 6	1; 6
2	(Soviet Union) (Hungary)	Alex Metreveli; Szabolcs Baranyi	6; 3	2; 6	6; 4	6; 0
3	(Soviet Union) (Hungary)	Sergei Likhachev / Alex Metreveli; Szabolcs Baranyi / Péter Szőke	6; 3	6; 4	10; 8
4	(Soviet Union) (Hungary)	Vladimir Korotkov; Szabolcs Baranyi	2; 6	2; 6	2; 6
5	(Soviet Union) (Hungary)	Alex Metreveli; Péter Szőke	6; 3	6; 3	6; 1

=== Quarterfinals ===
Romania vs. Iran

Romania
5
Bucharest, Romania
18–20 May 1972
Clay

Iran
0

			1	2	3	4	5
1	(Romania) (Iran)	Ilie Năstase; Taghi Akbari	6; 1	6; 1	6; 3
2	(Romania) (Iran)	Ion Țiriac; Hussain Akbari	6; 2	6; 3	6; 3
3	(Romania) (Iran)	Ilie Năstase / Ion Țiriac; Shirzad Akbari / Issa Khodaei	6; 1	6; 4	7; 5
4	(Romania) (Iran)	Toma Ovici; Hussain Akbari	6; 3	6; 3	6; 1
5	(Romania) (Iran)	Ion Țiriac; Taghi Akbari	6; 2	4; 6	5; 7	6; 3	6; 1

Italy vs. Netherlands

Italy
4
San Benedetto del Tronto, Italy
20–22 May 1972
Clay

Netherlands
1

			1	2	3	4	5
1	(Italy) (Netherlands)	Adriano Panatta; Jan Hordijk	10; 8	6; 2	6; 3
2	(Italy) (Netherlands)	Paolo Bertolucci; Fred Hemmes	6; 0	6; 4	2; 6	6; 3
3	(Italy) (Netherlands)	Adriano Panatta / Nicola Pietrangeli; Fred Hemmes / Jan Hordijk	3; 6	6; 1	6; 4	6; 2
4	(Italy) (Netherlands)	Paolo Bertolucci; Jan Hordijk	6; 1	6; 8	6; 1	5; 7	6; 8
5	(Italy) (Netherlands)	Adriano Panatta; Fred Hemmes	6; 1	6; 1	6; 1

Denmark vs. Poland

Denmark
0
Copenhagen, Denmark
19–21 May 1972
Clay

Poland
5

			1	2	3	4	5
1	(Denmark) (Poland)	Carl-Edvard Hedelund; Wieslaw Gasiorek	4; 6	4; 6	2; 6
2	(Denmark) (Poland)	Knud-Erik Nielsen; Tadeusz Nowicki	1; 6	3; 6	4; 6
3	(Denmark) (Poland)	Knud-Erik Nielsen / Henrik Nørkjær; Wojciech Fibak / Tadeusz Nowicki	2; 6	5; 7	5; 7
4	(Denmark) (Poland)	Knud-Erik Nielsen; Wieslaw Gasiorek	4; 6	1; 6	4; 6
5	(Denmark) (Poland)	Carl-Edvard Hedelund; Tadeusz Nowicki	1; 6	1; 6	2; 6

Morocco vs. Soviet Union

Morocco
0
Casablanca, Morocco
19–21 May 1972

Soviet Union
5

			1	2	3	4	5
1	(Morocco) (Soviet Union)	Omar Laimina; Alex Metreveli	3; 6	6; 3	0; 6	2; 6
2	(Morocco) (Soviet Union)	Ahmed Ben Omar; Vladimir Korotkov	0; 6	0; 6	2; 6
3	(Morocco) (Soviet Union)	Mohammed-Haibabi Bouchaib / Omar Laimina; Sergei Likhachev / Alex Metreveli	2; 6	2; 6	5; 7
4	(Morocco) (Soviet Union)	Omar Laimina; Vladimir Korotkov	6; 3	1; 6	2; 6	4; 6
5	(Morocco) (Soviet Union)	Abdullah Zamjaoui; Alex Metreveli	4; 6	5; 7	0; 6

=== Semifinals ===
Romania vs. Italy

Romania
4
Bucharest, Romania
16–18 June 1972
Clay

Italy
1

			1	2	3	4	5
1	(Romania) (Italy)	Ilie Năstase; Corrado Barazzutti	7; 5	6; 2	6; 0
2	(Romania) (Italy)	Ion Țiriac; Adriano Panatta	8; 6	7; 5	0; 6	6; 3
3	(Romania) (Italy)	Ilie Năstase / Ion Țiriac; Adriano Panatta / Nicola Pietrangeli	6; 2	9; 7	6; 4
4	(Romania) (Italy)	Petre Mărmureanu; Corrado Barazzutti	4; 6	5; 7	2; 6
5	(Romania) (Italy)	Ilie Năstase; Adriano Panatta	4; 6	6; 0	6; 3	6; 1

Poland vs. Soviet Union

Poland
0
Warsaw, Poland
9–11 June 1972

Soviet Union
4

			1	2	3	4	5
1	(Poland) (Soviet Union)	Tadeusz Nowicki; Alex Metreveli	3; 6	3; 6	3; 6
2	(Poland) (Soviet Union)	Wieslaw Gasiorek; Teimuraz Kakulia	6; 8	7; 5	3; 6	6; 2	1; 6
3	(Poland) (Soviet Union)	Wieslaw Gasiorek / Tadeusz Nowicki; Sergei Likhachev / Alex Metreveli	5; 7	4; 6	6; 4	7; 9
4	(Poland) (Soviet Union)	Wieslaw Gasiorek; Alex Metreveli	6; 4	5; 7	5; 7	6; 8
5	(Poland) (Soviet Union)	Tadeusz Nowicki; Teimuraz Kakulia						not played

=== Final ===
Soviet Union vs. Romania

Soviet Union
2
Tbilisi, Soviet Union
21–23 July 1972

Romania
3

			1	2	3	4	5
1	(Soviet Union) (Romania)	Alex Metreveli; Ilie Năstase	4; 6	0; 6	4; 6
2	(Soviet Union) (Romania)	Teimuraz Kakulia; Ion Țiriac	6; 4	7; 5	6; 1
3	(Soviet Union) (Romania)	Sergei Likhachev / Alex Metreveli; Ilie Năstase / Ion Țiriac	2; 6	4; 6	3; 6
4	(Soviet Union) (Romania)	Alex Metreveli; Ion Țiriac	2; 6	6; 4	1; 6	6; 4	6; 3
5	(Soviet Union) (Romania)	Teimuraz Kakulia; Ilie Năstase	2; 6	2; 6	3; 6

== Zone B ==
=== Draw ===
First Round; 28 April–7 May
Brussels, Belgium (clay)
Czechoslovakia	3
Belgium	2
Båstad, Sweden (clay)
Sweden	4
New Zealand	1
Athens, Greece
Greece	0
West Germany	5
Cork, Ireland
Ireland	5
Turkey	0
Paris, France (clay)
France	4
Great Britain	1
Sofia, Bulgaria
Bulgaria	0
Spain	5
Monte Carlo, Monaco
Monaco	3
Luxembourg	2
Portugal	w/o
South Africa

Quarterfinals; 19–22 May
Prague, Czechoslovakia (clay)
Czechoslovakia	3
Sweden	1
West Berlin
West Germany	5
Ireland	0
Paris, France (clay)
France	2
Spain	3
Monte Carlo, Monaco (clay)
Monaco	3
Portugal	2

Semifinals; 14–18 June
Düsseldorf, West Germany (clay)
Czechoslovakia	3
West Germany	2
Avilés, Spain
Spain	5
Monaco	0

Final; 21–24 July
Barcelona, Spain (clay)
Czechoslovakia	2
Spain	3

=== First round ===
Belgium vs. Czechoslovakia

Belgium
2
Brussels, Belgium
5–7 May 1972
Clay

Czechoslovakia
3

			1	2	3	4	5
1	(Belgium) (Czechoslovakia)	Bernard Mignot; Jan Kodeš	2; 6	2; 6	4; 6
2	(Belgium) (Czechoslovakia)	Patrick Hombergen; František Pála	6; 2	3; 6	6; 3	3; 6	8; 10
3	(Belgium) (Czechoslovakia)	Eric Drossart / Patrick Hombergen; Jiří Hřebec / Jan Kukal	6; 3	10; 8	6; 4
4	(Belgium) (Czechoslovakia)	Patrick Hombergen; Jan Kodeš	8; 10	2; 6	2; 6
5	(Belgium) (Czechoslovakia)	Bernard Mignot; František Pála	6; 3	6; 4	7; 5

Sweden vs. New Zealand

Sweden
4
Båstad Tennis Stadium, Båstad, Sweden
5–7 May 1972
Clay

New Zealand
1

			1	2	3	4	5
1	(Sweden) (New Zealand)	Björn Borg; Onny Parun	4; 6	3; 6	6; 3	6; 4	6; 4
2	(Sweden) (New Zealand)	Ove Bengtson; Jeff Simpson	9; 7	6; 1	3; 6	6; 3
3	(Sweden) (New Zealand)	Ove Bengtson / Björn Borg; Onny Parun / Jeff Simpson	6; 8	3; 6	7; 9
4	(Sweden) (New Zealand)	Ove Bengtson; Onny Parun	6; 4	16; 14	13; 11
5	(Sweden) (New Zealand)	Björn Borg; Jeff Simpson	9; 7	6; 4	5; 7	6; 1

Greece vs. West Germany

Greece
0
Athens, Greece
5–7 May 1972

West Germany
5

			1	2	3	4	5
1	(Greece) (West Germany)	Nicholas Kalogeropoulos; Harald Elschenbroich	7; 5	4; 6	4; 6	2; 6
2	(Greece) (West Germany)	Periclis Gavrilidis; Christian Kuhnke	0; 6	5; 7	4; 6
3	(Greece) (West Germany)	Periclis Gavrilidis / Nicholas Kalogeropoulos; Jürgen Fassbender / Hans-Jürgen Pohmann	3; 6	2; 6	4; 6
4	(Greece) (West Germany)	Periclis Gavrilidis; Harald Elschenbroich	2; 6	1; 6	0; 6
5	(Greece) (West Germany)	Nicholas Kalogeropoulos; Christian Kuhnke	6; 3	6; 8	1; 6	4; 6

Ireland vs. Turkey

Ireland
5
Rushbrooke Lawn Tennis Club, Cork, Ireland
5–7 May 1972

Turkey
0

			1	2	3	4	5
1	(Republic of Ireland) (Turkey)	Peter Jackson; Beyazıt Anbar	4; 6	6; 2	6; 2	6; 3
2	(Republic of Ireland) (Turkey)	Michael Hickey; Bülent Altınkaya	6; 3	6; 3	11; 9
3	(Republic of Ireland) (Turkey)	William Brown / Michael Hickey; Bülent Altınkaya / Tahsin Gürsoy	6; 2	6; 4	6; 0
4	(Republic of Ireland) (Turkey)	Kenneth Reid; Beyazıt Anbar	6; 4	9; 7	7; 5
5	(Republic of Ireland) (Turkey)	Peter Jackson; Bülent Altınkaya	8; 6	8; 6	3; 6	6; 0

France vs. Great Britain

France
4
Stade Roland Garros, Paris, France
5–7 May 1972
Clay

Great Britain
1

			1	2	3	4	5
1	(France) (United Kingdom)	Patrick Proisy; David Lloyd	6; 1	6; 3	6; 2
2	(France) (United Kingdom)	Pierre Barthès; John Paish	6; 0	6; 1	6; 4
3	(France) (United Kingdom)	Pierre Barthès / Georges Goven; David Lloyd / John Paish	3; 6	6; 4	1; 6	3; 6
4	(France) (United Kingdom)	Pierre Barthès; David Lloyd	6; 0	6; 3	6; 1
5	(France) (United Kingdom)	Patrick Proisy; John Paish	6; 1	6; 0	6; 4

Bulgaria vs. Spain

Bulgaria
0
Sofia, Bulgaria
5–7 May 1972

Spain
5

			1	2	3	4	5
1	(Bulgaria) (Spain)	Ljuben Genov; Andrés Gimeno	3; 6	2; 6	1; 6
2	(Bulgaria) (Spain)	Bozhidar Pampoulov; Manuel Orantes	4; 6	2; 6	2; 6
3	(Bulgaria) (Spain)	Bozhidar Pampoulov / Matei Pampoulov; Andrés Gimeno / Juan Gisbert	4; 6	4; 6	5; 7
4	(Bulgaria) (Spain)	Bozhidar Pampoulov; Andrés Gimeno	0; 6	2; 6	5; 7
5	(Bulgaria) (Spain)	Ljuben Genov; Antonio Muñoz	4; 6	1; 6	3; 6

Monaco vs. Luxembourg

Monaco
3
Monte Carlo, Monaco
28–30 April 1972

Luxembourg
2

			1	2	3	4	5
1	(Monaco) (Luxembourg)	Patrick Landau; Jean Neuman	8; 6	6; 2	6; 3
2	(Monaco) (Luxembourg)	Francis Truchi; Frank Baden	6; 4	5; 7	3; 6	3; 6
3	(Monaco) (Luxembourg)	Patrick Landau / Francis Truchi; Georges Logelin / Jean Neuman	6; 3	6; 2	4; 6	6; 1
4	(Monaco) (Luxembourg)	Patrick Landau; Frank Baden	4; 6	1; 6	6; 2	6; 4	4; 6
5	(Monaco) (Luxembourg)	Francis Truchi; Jean Neuman	6; 1	6; 3	6; 3

=== Quarterfinals ===
Czechoslovakia vs. Sweden

Czechoslovakia
3
Štvanice Stadium, Prague, Czechoslovakia
19–21 May 1972
Clay

Sweden
1

			1	2	3	4	5
1	(Czechoslovakia) (Sweden)	Jan Kodeš; Björn Borg	6; 2	6; 3	7; 5
2	(Czechoslovakia) (Sweden)	František Pála; Ove Bengtson	8; 6	2; 6	0; 6	3; 6
3	(Czechoslovakia) (Sweden)	Jan Kodeš / Jan Kukal; Ove Bengtson / Björn Borg	8; 6	6; 4	6; 3
4	(Czechoslovakia) (Sweden)	František Pála; Björn Borg	6; 4	6; 4	6; 4
5	(Czechoslovakia) (Sweden)	Jan Kodeš; Ove Bengtson	4; 6	2; 1				not completed

West Germany vs. Ireland

West Germany
5
West Berlin
20–22 May 1972

Ireland
0

			1	2	3	4	5
1	(West Germany) (Republic of Ireland)	Christian Kuhnke; Michael Hickey	6; 3	6; 3	6; 0
2	(West Germany) (Republic of Ireland)	Harald Elschenbroich; Kenneth Reid	6; 2	6; 0	6; 0
3	(West Germany) (Republic of Ireland)	Jürgen Fassbender / Hans-Jürgen Pohmann; William Brown / Michael Hickey	6; 3	6; 3	6; 3
4	(West Germany) (Republic of Ireland)	Christian Kuhnke; Peter Jackson	6; 2	6; 0	6; 3
5	(West Germany) (Republic of Ireland)	Harald Elschenbroich; Michael Hickey	6; 2	6; 0	6; 2

France vs. Spain

France
2
Stade Roland Garros, Paris, France
19–21 May 1972
Clay

Spain
3

			1	2	3	4	5
1	(France) (Spain)	Pierre Barthès; Andrés Gimeno	7; 5	4; 6	7; 5	3; 6	3; 6
2	(France) (Spain)	Patrick Proisy; Manuel Orantes	0; 6	3; 6	3; 6
3	(France) (Spain)	Pierre Barthès / Patrick Proisy; Juan Gisbert / Manuel Orantes	4; 6	6; 8	4; 6
4	(France) (Spain)	Patrice Dominguez; Antonio Muñoz	6; 2	9; 7	6; 3
5	(France) (Spain)	Patrick Proisy; Andrés Gimeno	6; 2	6; 2	9; 11	6; 3

Monaco vs. Portugal

Monaco
3
Monte Carlo, Monaco
20–22 May 1972
Clay

Portugal
2

			1	2	3	4	5
1	(Monaco) (Portugal)	Francis Truchi; Raúl Peralta	6; 4	1; 6	4; 6	4; 6
2	(Monaco) (Portugal)	Patrick Landau; Alfredo Vaz Pinto	6; 3	5; 7	6; 1	5; 7	6; 3
3	(Monaco) (Portugal)	Patrick Landau / Francis Truchi; Raúl Peralta / José Vilela	6; 3	3; 6	6; 3	3; 6	6; 3
4	(Monaco) (Portugal)	Francis Truchi; Alfredo Vaz Pinto	6; 1	6; 3	1; 6	6; 4
5	(Monaco) (Portugal)	Bernard Balleret; José Vilela	2; 6	6; 2	0; 6	4; 6

=== Semifinals ===
West Germany vs. Czechoslovakia

West Germany
2
Düsseldorf, West Germany
16–18 June 1972
Clay

Czechoslovakia
3

			1	2	3	4	5
1	(West Germany) (Czechoslovakia)	Harald Elschenbroich; František Pála	6; 3	6; 4	4; 6	6; 4
2	(West Germany) (Czechoslovakia)	Jürgen Fassbender; Jan Kodeš	6; 3	3; 6	2; 6	8; 10
3	(West Germany) (Czechoslovakia)	Jürgen Fassbender / Hans-Jürgen Pohmann; Jan Kodeš / Jan Kukal	6; 4	3; 6	6; 3	2; 6	17; 19
4	(West Germany) (Czechoslovakia)	Harald Elschenbroich; Jan Kodeš	4; 6	6; 4	2; 6	6; 1	6; 8
5	(West Germany) (Czechoslovakia)	Jürgen Fassbender; František Pála	6; 4	6; 4	6; 2

Spain vs. Monaco

Spain
5
Club de Tenis Avilés, Avilés, Spain
14–16 June 1972

Monaco
0

			1	2	3	4	5
1	(Spain) (Monaco)	Manuel Orantes; Francis Truchi	6; 0	6; 1	6; 0
2	(Spain) (Monaco)	Andrés Gimeno; Patrick Landau	6; 3	6; 2	6; 2
3	(Spain) (Monaco)	Juan Gisbert / Manuel Orantes; Patrick Landau / Francis Truchi	6; 0	6; 2	6; 0
4	(Spain) (Monaco)	Antonio Muñoz; Patrick Landau	6; 1	7; 5	6; 1
5	(Spain) (Monaco)	Juan Gisbert; Bernard Balleret	6; 1	6; 2	6; 0

=== Final ===
Spain vs. Czechoslovakia

Spain
3
Barcelona, Spain
21–24 July 1972
Clay

Czechoslovakia
2

			1	2	3	4	5
1	(Spain) (Czechoslovakia)	Juan Gisbert; Jan Kodeš	8; 6	6; 4	5; 7	0; 6	6; 4
2	(Spain) (Czechoslovakia)	Manuel Orantes; František Pála	5; 7	4; 6	6; 0	7; 5	4; 6
3	(Spain) (Czechoslovakia)	Juan Gisbert / Manuel Orantes; Jan Kodeš / Jan Kukal	10; 12	6; 2	7; 5	6; 4
4	(Spain) (Czechoslovakia)	Juan Gisbert; František Pála	6; 3	6; 3	4; 6	6; 0
5	(Spain) (Czechoslovakia)	Antonio Muñoz; Jiří Hřebec	4; 6	0; 6	3; 6
