= 1971 Davis Cup Europe Zone =

International tennis competition

The Europe Zone was one of the three regional zones of the 1971 Davis Cup.

30 teams entered the Europe Zone, competing across 2 sub-zones. The winners of each sub-zone went on to compete in the Inter-Zonal Zone against the winners of the Americas Zone and Eastern Zone.

Czechoslovakia defeated Romania in the Zone A final, and West Germany defeated Spain in the Zone B final, resulting in both Czechoslovakia and Romania progressing to the Inter-Zonal Zone.

== Zone A ==
=== Draw ===
First round 30 April–9 May
Spain
bye
Switzerland
bye
Båstad, Sweden (clay)
Sweden	0
France	5
Helsinki, Finland
Finland	5
Ireland	0
Cairo, Egypt (clay)
Egypt	1
Czechoslovakia	4
Lisbon, Portugal (clay)
Portugal	4
Turkey	1
Athens, Greece
Greece	1
Belgium	3
Copenhagen, Denmark (clay)
Denmark	0
Soviet Union	5

Quarterfinals; 13–16 May
Basel, Switzerland
Spain	4
Switzerland	0
Paris, France (clay)
France	3
Finland	0
Prague, Czechoslovakia (clay)
Czechoslovakia	5
Portugal	0
Brussels, Belgium
Belgium	1
Soviet Union	4

Semifinals; 11–13 June
Barcelona, Spain
Spain	4
France	1
Prague, Czechoslovakia (clay)
Czechoslovakia	4
Soviet Union	1

Final; 16–18 July
Prague, Czechoslovakia (clay)
Spain	2
Czechoslovakia	3

=== First round ===
Sweden vs. France

Sweden
0
Båstad Tennis Stadium, Båstad, Sweden
7–9 May 1971
Clay

France
5

			1	2	3	4	5
1	(Sweden) (France)	Ove Bengtson; Patrick Proisy	3; 6	2; 6	3; 6
2	(Sweden) (France)	Håkan Zahr; Pierre Barthès	1; 6	4; 6	1; 6
3	(Sweden) (France)	Ove Bengtson / Hans Nerell; Pierre Barthès / François Jauffret	6; 3	13; 15	6; 8	5; 7
4	(Sweden) (France)	Hans Nerell; Patrick Proisy	2; 6	3; 6	1; 6
5	(Sweden) (France)	Ove Bengtson; Pierre Barthès	3; 6	3; 6	6; 4	6; 3	3; 6

Finland vs. Ireland

Finland
5
Helsinki, Finland
7–9 May 1971

Ireland
0

			1	2	3	4	5
1	(Finland) (Republic of Ireland)	George Berner; William Brown	6; 1	6; 4	6; 3
2	(Finland) (Republic of Ireland)	Pekka Säilä; Michael Hickey	6; 3	6; 2	6; 8	6; 2
3	(Finland) (Republic of Ireland)	George Berner / Pekka Säilä; Michael Hickey / Peter Jackson	6; 4	4; 6	13; 11	6; 0
4	(Finland) (Republic of Ireland)	George Berner; Michael Hickey	6; 3	6; 1	6; 2
5	(Finland) (Republic of Ireland)	Pekka Säilä; William Brown	6; 3	6; 1	6; 0

Egypt vs. Czechoslovakia

Egypt
1
Cairo, Egypt
30 April–2 May 1971
Clay

Czechoslovakia
4

			1	2	3	4	5
1	(Egypt) (Czechoslovakia)	Ibrahim Mahmoud; Jan Kodeš	2; 6	4; 6	1; 6
2	(Egypt) (Czechoslovakia)	Moataz El Sonbol; František Pála	2; 6	1; 6	5; 7
3	(Egypt) (Czechoslovakia)	Aly El Dawoudi / Ibrahim Mahmoud; Jan Kukal / Vladimír Zedník	3; 6	4; 6	2; 6
4	(Egypt) (Czechoslovakia)	Ibrahim Mahmoud; František Pála	4; 6	2; 6	3; 6
5	(Egypt) (Czechoslovakia)	Moataz El Sonbol; Vladimír Zedník	7; 5	6; 3	6; 4

Portugal vs. Turkey

Portugal
4
Lisbon, Portugal
1–3 May 1971
Clay

Turkey
1

			1	2	3	4	5
1	(Portugal) (Turkey)	Alfredo Vaz Pinto; Remzi Aydın	6; 3	6; 0	6; 0
2	(Portugal) (Turkey)	Raúl Peralta; Tahsin Gürsoy	6; 3	6; 3	6; 0
3	(Portugal) (Turkey)	Raúl Peralta / Alfredo Vaz Pinto; Remzi Aydın / Tahsin Gürsoy	7; 5	6; 3	6; 0
4	(Portugal) (Turkey)	José Vilela; Beyazıt Anbar	6; 0	6; 3	6; 4
5	(Portugal) (Turkey)	Olivio Silva; Remzi Aydın	7; 5	6; 4	2; 6	3; 6	2; 6

Greece vs. Belgium

Greece
1
Athens, Greece
30 April–2 May 1971

Belgium
3

			1	2	3	4	5
1	(Greece) (Belgium)	Nicholas Kalogeropoulos; Eric Drossart	6; 2	2; 6	6; 4	4; 6	6; 3
2	(Greece) (Belgium)	Periclis Gavrilidis; Patrick Hombergen	1; 6	2; 6	6; 3	3; 6
3	(Greece) (Belgium)	Periclis Gavrilidis / Nicholas Kalogeropoulos; Eric Drossart / Patrick Hombergen	5; 7	3; 6	3; 6
4	(Greece) (Belgium)	Periclis Gavrilidis; Eric Drossart	4; 6	4; 6	1; 6
5	(Greece) (Belgium)	Nicholas Kalogeropoulos; Patrick Hombergen	6; 3	4; 6	2; 6	6; 3	6; 6	not completed

Denmark vs. Soviet Union

Denmark
0
Copenhagen, Denmark
7–9 May 1971
Clay

Soviet Union
5

			1	2	3	4	5
1	(Denmark) (Soviet Union)	Jørgen Ulrich; Vladimir Korotkov	3; 6	2; 6	0; 6
2	(Denmark) (Soviet Union)	Jan Leschly; Alex Metreveli	4; 6	3; 6	2; 6
3	(Denmark) (Soviet Union)	Jan Leschly / Jørgen Ulrich; Sergei Likhachev / Alex Metreveli	0; 6	4; 6	4; 6
4	(Denmark) (Soviet Union)	Jørgen Ulrich; Alex Metreveli	2; 6	1; 6	2; 6
5	(Denmark) (Soviet Union)	Jan Leschly; Vladimir Korotkov	7; 9	6; 3	0; 6	3; 6

=== Quarterfinals ===
Switzerland vs. Spain

Switzerland
0
Basel, Switzerland
14–16 May 1971

Spain
4

			1	2	3	4	5
1	(Switzerland) (Spain)	Matthias Werren; Manuel Orantes	1; 6	1; 6	4; 6
2	(Switzerland) (Spain)	Dimitri Sturdza; Juan Gisbert	2; 6	4; 6	3; 6
3	(Switzerland) (Spain)	Leonardo Manta / Matthias Werren; Juan Gisbert / Manuel Orantes	4; 6	7; 9	2; 6
4	(Switzerland) (Spain)	Dimitri Sturdza; Manuel Orantes	5; 7	7; 9	9; 7	6; 8
5	(Switzerland) (Spain)	Matthias Werren; Antonio Muñoz	21; 23	1; 3				not completed

France vs. Finland

France
3
Stade Roland Garros, Paris, France
14–16 May 1971
Clay

Finland
0

			1	2	3	4	5
1	(France) (Finland)	François Jauffret; George Berner	7; 5	6; 2	6; 2
2	(France) (Finland)	Patrick Proisy; Pekka Säilä	6; 4	6; 0	6; 2
3	(France) (Finland)	Patrice Dominguez / Patrick Proisy; George Berner / Pekka Säilä	6; 4	7; 5	7; 5
4	(France) (Finland)	Patrick Proisy; George Berner	6; 3	6; 3	4; 6	3; 0		not completed
5	(France) (Finland)	François Jauffret; Pekka Säilä						not played

Czechoslovakia vs. Portugal

Czechoslovakia
5
Prague, Czechoslovakia
13–15 May 1971
Clay

Portugal
0

			1	2	3	4	5
1	(Czechoslovakia) (Portugal)	František Pála; Alfredo Vaz Pinto	6; 1	6; 1	6; 1
2	(Czechoslovakia) (Portugal)	Jan Kodeš; Raúl Peralta	8; 6	6; 0	6; 2
3	(Czechoslovakia) (Portugal)	Jan Kodeš / Jan Kukal; Raúl Peralta / Alfredo Vaz Pinto	6; 0	6; 2	6; 1
4	(Czechoslovakia) (Portugal)	Jan Kukal; Alfredo Vaz Pinto	6; 2	6; 0	6; 2
5	(Czechoslovakia) (Portugal)	František Pála; Raúl Peralta	6; 1	6; 2	6; 1

Belgium vs. Soviet Union

Belgium
1
Brussels, Belgium
14–16 May 1971

Soviet Union
4

			1	2	3	4	5
1	(Belgium) (Soviet Union)	Eric Drossart; Alex Metreveli	3; 6	2; 6	2; 6
2	(Belgium) (Soviet Union)	Patrick Hombergen; Vladimir Korotkov	6; 3	6; 3	6; 1
3	(Belgium) (Soviet Union)	Eric Drossart / Patrick Hombergen; Sergei Likhachev / Alex Metreveli	5; 7	6; 4	11; 13	3; 6
4	(Belgium) (Soviet Union)	Patrick Hombergen; Alex Metreveli	0; 6	2; 6	0; 6
5	(Belgium) (Soviet Union)	Eric Drossart; Vladimir Korotkov	6; 3	3; 6	7; 5	7; 9	6; 8

=== Semifinals ===
Spain vs. France

Spain
4
Barcelona, Spain
11–13 June 1971

France
1

			1	2	3	4	5
1	(Spain) (France)	Juan Gisbert; François Jauffret	2; 6	3; 6	2; 6
2	(Spain) (France)	Manuel Orantes; Patrick Proisy	6; 1	6; 2	6; 3
3	(Spain) (France)	Juan Gisbert / Manuel Orantes; Pierre Barthès / François Jauffret	6; 3	4; 6	6; 3	6; 2
4	(Spain) (France)	Manuel Orantes; François Jauffret	6; 4	7; 9	6; 4	5; 7	7; 5
5	(Spain) (France)	Juan Gisbert; Patrick Proisy	6; 2	6; 3	6; 4

Czechoslovakia vs. Soviet Union

Czechoslovakia
4
Prague, Czechoslovakia
11–13 June 1971
Clay

Soviet Union
1

			1	2	3	4	5
1	(Czechoslovakia) (Soviet Union)	Jan Kodeš; Alex Metreveli	5; 7	6; 3	6; 4	5; 7	3; 6
2	(Czechoslovakia) (Soviet Union)	František Pála; Vladimir Korotkov	6; 3	6; 4	7; 5
3	(Czechoslovakia) (Soviet Union)	Jan Kodeš / Jan Kukal; Sergei Likhachev / Alex Metreveli	3; 6	6; 4	2; 6	7; 5	6; 3
4	(Czechoslovakia) (Soviet Union)	Jan Kodeš; Vladimir Korotkov	6; 0	6; 3	7; 5
5	(Czechoslovakia) (Soviet Union)	František Pála; Alex Metreveli	6; 0	6; 4	2; 0			retired

=== Final ===
Czechoslovakia vs. Spain

Czechoslovakia
3
Prague, Czechoslovakia
16–18 July 1971
Clay

Spain
2

			1	2	3	4	5
1	(Czechoslovakia) (Spain)	František Pála; Manuel Orantes	6; 2	4; 6	2; 6	5; 7
2	(Czechoslovakia) (Spain)	Jan Kodeš; Juan Gisbert	6; 3	4; 6	9; 7	7; 5
3	(Czechoslovakia) (Spain)	Jan Kodeš / Jan Kukal; Juan Gisbert / Manuel Orantes	4; 6	9; 11	4; 6
4	(Czechoslovakia) (Spain)	František Pála; Juan Gisbert	6; 0	6; 1	6; 1
5	(Czechoslovakia) (Spain)	Jan Kodeš; Manuel Orantes	7; 5	4; 6	7; 5	6; 4

== Zone B ==
=== Draw ===
First round 28 April–8 May
West Germany
bye
Austria
bye
Budapest, Hungary
Hungary	5
Poland	0
Mondorf-les-Bains, Luxembourg
Luxembourg	5
Monaco	0
Tel Aviv, Israel (hard)
Israel	4
Norway	1
Bucharest, Romania (clay)
Romania	5
Netherlands	0
Perugia, Italy (clay)
Italy	5
Bulgaria	0
Zagreb, Yugoslavia (clay)
Great Britain	0
Yugoslavia	3

Quarterfinals; 14–16 May
Augsburg, West Germany
West Germany	4
Austria	1
Budapest, Hungary
Hungary	5
Luxembourg	0
Tel Aviv, Israel (hard)
Israel	0
Romania	5
Zagreb, Yugoslavia
Italy	2
Yugoslavia	3

Semifinals; 10–14 June
Munich, West Germany
West Germany	4
Hungary	1
Bucharest, Romania (clay)
Romania	4
Yugoslavia	1

Final; 16–18 July
Bucharest, Romania (clay)
West Germany	0
Romania	5

=== First round ===
Hungary vs. Poland

Hungary
5
Budapest, Hungary
30 April–2 May 1971

Poland
0

			1	2	3	4	5
1	(Hungary) (Poland)	István Gulyás; Tadeusz Nowicki	6; 3	6; 3	2; 6	6; 3
2	(Hungary) (Poland)	Szabolcs Baranyi; Wiesław Gąsiorek	1; 6	6; 3	6; 1	6; 4
3	(Hungary) (Poland)	Szabolcs Baranyi / Róbert Machán; Jacek Niedźwiedzki / Tadeusz Nowicki	6; 4	6; 4	6; 2
4	(Hungary) (Poland)	Szabolcs Baranyi; Tadeusz Nowicki	6; 4	6; 4	6; 0
5	(Hungary) (Poland)	István Gulyás; Wiesław Gąsiorek	6; 4	9; 7	6; 0

Luxembourg vs. Monaco

Luxembourg
5
Mondorf-les-Bains, Luxembourg
30 April–2 May 1971

Monaco
0

			1	2	3	4	5
1	(Luxembourg) (Monaco)	Frank Baden; Francis Truchi	6; 1	6; 4	7; 5
2	(Luxembourg) (Monaco)	Thierry Brasseur; Adrien Viviani	6; 3	7; 5	6; 4
3	(Luxembourg) (Monaco)	Frank Baden / Thierry Brasseur; Bernard Balleret / Francis Truchi	6; 2	6; 3	7; 5
4	(Luxembourg) (Monaco)	Frank Baden; Adrien Viviani	6; 4	3; 6	9; 7	6; 3
5	(Luxembourg) (Monaco)	Thierry Brasseur; Francis Truchi	6; 4	9; 7	6; 2

Israel vs. Norway

Israel
4
Tel Aviv, Israel
6–8 May 1971
Hard

Norway
1

			1	2	3	4	5
1	(Israel) (Norway)	Josef Stabholz; Erik Melander	3; 6	6; 4	6; 4	6; 0
2	(Israel) (Norway)	Yehoshua Shalem; Jon-Erik Ross	10; 12	6; 4	6; 3	6; 0
3	(Israel) (Norway)	Eleazar Davidman / Ian Froman; Erik Melander / Frithjof Prydz	7; 5	4; 6	3; 6	4; 6
4	(Israel) (Norway)	Yehoshua Shalem; Erik Melander	6; 1	5; 7	6; 1			retired
5	(Israel) (Norway)	Josef Stabholz; Jon-Erik Ross	7; 5	3; 6	6; 2	1; 6	6; 1

Romania vs. Netherlands

Romania
5
Bucharest, Romania
30 April–2 May 1971
Clay

Netherlands
0

			1	2	3	4	5
1	(Romania) (Netherlands)	Ion Țiriac; Fred Hemmes	7; 5	6; 1	6; 3
2	(Romania) (Netherlands)	Ilie Năstase; Jan Hordijk	6; 2	6; 2	6; 3
3	(Romania) (Netherlands)	Ilie Năstase / Ion Țiriac; Fred Hemmes / Jan Hordijk	6; 2	6; 2	6; 3
4	(Romania) (Netherlands)	Ion Țiriac; Jan Hordijk	6; 1	6; 1	6; 1
5	(Romania) (Netherlands)	Ilie Năstase; Fred Hemmes	6; 0	6; 2	6; 4

Italy vs. Bulgaria

Italy
5
Perugia, Italy
30 April–2 May 1971
Clay

Bulgaria
0

			1	2	3	4	5
1	(Italy) (Bulgaria)	Massimo Di Domenico; Bozhidar Pampoulov	3; 6	6; 2	6; 1	6; 3
2	(Italy) (Bulgaria)	Adriano Panatta; Ljuben Genov	6; 1	6; 3	6; 3
3	(Italy) (Bulgaria)	Massimo Di Domenico / Adriano Panatta; Bozhidar Pampoulov / Matei Pampoulov	6; 4	6; 4	6; 4
4	(Italy) (Bulgaria)	Antonio Zugarelli; Ljuben Genov	6; 4	6; 2	6; 3
5	(Italy) (Bulgaria)	Ezio Di Matteo; Bozhidar Pampoulov	6; 3	6; 3	6; 1

Yugoslavia vs. Great Britain

Yugoslavia
3
Zagreb, Yugoslavia
28–30 April 1971
Clay

Great Britain
0

			1	2	3	4	5
1	(Socialist Federal Republic of Yugoslavia) (United Kingdom)	Željko Franulović; Gerald Battrick	6; 2	6; 2	6; 0
2	(Socialist Federal Republic of Yugoslavia) (United Kingdom)	Boro Jovanović; Stanley Matthews	6; 2	6; 4	9; 11	2; 6	6; 4
3	(Socialist Federal Republic of Yugoslavia) (United Kingdom)	Željko Franulović / Boro Jovanović; Gerald Battrick / Stanley Matthews	7; 5	5; 7	0; 6	7; 5	6; 0
4	(Socialist Federal Republic of Yugoslavia) (United Kingdom)	Boro Jovanović; Gerald Battrick						not played
5	(Socialist Federal Republic of Yugoslavia) (United Kingdom)	Željko Franulović; Stanley Matthews						not played

=== Quarterfinals ===
West Germany vs. Austria

West Germany
4
Augsburg, West Germany
14–16 May 1971

Austria
1

			1	2	3	4	5
1	(West Germany) (Austria)	Wilhelm Bungert; Peter Pokorny	5; 7	1; 6	7; 5	8; 6	6; 2
2	(West Germany) (Austria)	Christian Kuhnke; Hans Kary	6; 4	6; 2	0; 6	0; 6	5; 7
3	(West Germany) (Austria)	Jürgen Fassbender / Hans-Jürgen Pohmann; Ernst Blanke / Rudolf Hoskowetz	6; 2	6; 4	6; 3
4	(West Germany) (Austria)	Christian Kuhnke; Peter Pokorny	6; 3	6; 1	6; 4
5	(West Germany) (Austria)	Wilhelm Bungert; Hans Kary	6; 3	3; 6	6; 3	2; 6	7; 5

Hungary vs. Luxembourg

Hungary
5
Budapest, Hungary
14–16 May 1971

Luxembourg
0

			1	2	3	4	5
1	(Hungary) (Luxembourg)	Szabolcs Baranyi; Georges Logelin	6; 2	6; 1	6; 2
2	(Hungary) (Luxembourg)	István Gulyás; Joseph Offenheim	6; 3	6; 2	6; 0
3	(Hungary) (Luxembourg)	Szabolcs Baranyi / Róbert Machán; Georges Logelin / Joseph Offenheim	6; 2	6; 2	6; 1
4	(Hungary) (Luxembourg)	István Gulyás; Georges Logelin	6; 2	6; 1	6; 1
5	(Hungary) (Luxembourg)	Szabolcs Baranyi; Joseph Offenheim	6; 1	6; 1	6; 1

Israel vs. Romania

Israel
0
Tel Aviv, Israel
14–16 May 1971
Hard

Romania
5

			1	2	3	4	5
1	(Israel) (Romania)	Josef Stabholz; Ion Țiriac	0; 6	0; 6	0; 6
2	(Israel) (Romania)	Yehoshua Shalem; Ilie Năstase	1; 6	2; 6	3; 6
3	(Israel) (Romania)	Ian Froman / Josef Stabholz; Sever Dron / Ion Țiriac	2; 6	2; 6	3; 6
4	(Israel) (Romania)	Yehoshua Shalem; Ion Țiriac	2; 6	0; 6	3; 6
5	(Israel) (Romania)	Josef Stabholz; Ilie Năstase	0; 6	0; 6	1; 6

Yugoslavia vs. Italy

Yugoslavia
3
Zagreb, Yugoslavia
14–16 May 1971

Italy
2

			1	2	3	4	5
1	(Socialist Federal Republic of Yugoslavia) (Italy)	Željko Franulović; Nicola Pietrangeli	7; 5	8; 6	6; 1
2	(Socialist Federal Republic of Yugoslavia) (Italy)	Boro Jovanović; Adriano Panatta	6; 0	3; 6	4; 6	6; 3	6; 2
3	(Socialist Federal Republic of Yugoslavia) (Italy)	Željko Franulović / Boro Jovanović; Massimo Di Domenico / Adriano Panatta	3; 6	6; 0	4; 6	7; 5	6; 3
4	(Socialist Federal Republic of Yugoslavia) (Italy)	Boro Jovanović; Nicola Pietrangeli	2; 6	2; 6	1; 6
5	(Socialist Federal Republic of Yugoslavia) (Italy)	Zlatko Ivančić; Antonio Zugarelli	4; 6	3; 6	2; 6

=== Semifinals ===
West Germany vs. Hungary

West Germany
4
Munich, West Germany
10–12 June 1971

Hungary
1

			1	2	3	4	5
1	(West Germany) (Hungary)	Christian Kuhnke; István Gulyás	3; 6	6; 4	6; 2	2; 6	6; 3
2	(West Germany) (Hungary)	Wilhelm Bungert; Szabolcs Baranyi	5; 7	6; 3	6; 3	6; 3
3	(West Germany) (Hungary)	Jürgen Fassbender / Hans-Jürgen Pohmann; Szabolcs Baranyi / Péter Szőke	5; 7	6; 3	6; 2	4; 6	6; 4
4	(West Germany) (Hungary)	Wilhelm Bungert; István Gulyás	6; 3	6; 4	7; 5
5	(West Germany) (Hungary)	Christian Kuhnke; Szabolcs Baranyi	1; 6	8; 10	2; 6

Romania vs. Yugoslavia

Romania
4
Bucharest, Romania
11–14 June 1971
Clay

Yugoslavia
1

			1	2	3	4	5
1	(Romania) (Socialist Federal Republic of Yugoslavia)	Ilie Năstase; Željko Franulović	7; 5	6; 2	6; 3
2	(Romania) (Socialist Federal Republic of Yugoslavia)	Ion Țiriac; Boro Jovanović	6; 4	7; 5	2; 6	6; 4
3	(Romania) (Socialist Federal Republic of Yugoslavia)	Ilie Năstase / Ion Țiriac; Željko Franulović / Boro Jovanović	6; 0	6; 4	9; 7
4	(Romania) (Socialist Federal Republic of Yugoslavia)	Ion Țiriac; Željko Franulović	4; 6	0; 6	6; 4	3; 6
5	(Romania) (Socialist Federal Republic of Yugoslavia)	Ilie Năstase; Boro Jovanović	4; 6	6; 4				retired

=== Final ===
Romania vs. West Germany

Romania
5
Bucharest, Romania
16–18 July 1971
Clay

West Germany
0

			1	2	3	4	5
1	(Romania) (West Germany)	Ion Țiriac; Christian Kuhnke	6; 2	3; 6	6; 2	7; 5
2	(Romania) (West Germany)	Ilie Năstase; Wilhelm Bungert	6; 2	6; 3	6; 2
3	(Romania) (West Germany)	Ilie Năstase / Ion Țiriac; Jürgen Fassbender / Hans-Jürgen Pohmann	8; 6	6; 4	6; 4
4	(Romania) (West Germany)	Ilie Năstase; Christian Kuhnke	6; 0	6; 4	6; 4
5	(Romania) (West Germany)	Petre Mărmureanu; Wilhelm Bungert	6; 1	7; 5	6; 1
