= Fred Hemmes =

Fred Hemmes may refer to:

- Fred Hemmes Sr. (born 1950), Dutch tennis player
- Fred Hemmes Jr. (born 1981), his son, also a Dutch tennis player
