= Patrick Landau =

Monegasque tennis player

- Country (sports): Monaco
- Born: September 5, 1945; Monaco
- Died: October 3, 2007 (aged 62); Monaco
- Plays: right-handed

Patrick Landau (5 September 1945 – 3 October 2007) was a tennis player from Monaco. During his career, Landau competed at Roland Garros and at the Davis Cup.

== Early life and family ==
Landau's paternal aunt was the Russian ballet dancer Alice Nikitina.

== Career ==
Landau studied at Brigham Young University, where he trained at the BYU Cougars.

Landau competed in the Davis Cup during several years between 1966 and 1972.

He also played in Roland Garros versus Zdravko Mincek.
