= Carl-Edvard Hedelund =

Danish tennis player

- Country (sports): Denmark
- Born: 14 March 1941 (age 84)
- Plays: Right-handed

Singles
- Career record: 0–3

Grand Slam singles results
- Wimbledon: Q1 (1963)
- US Open: 1R (1963)

Grand Slam mixed doubles results
- Wimbledon: 3R (1963)

Carl-Edvard Hedelund (born 14 March 1941) is a former tennis player from Denmark.

== Tennis career ==
Hedelund participated at the 1959 Wimbledon boys' singles event, losing in the first round to eventual winner, Toomas Leius.

Hedelund represented the Denmark Davis Cup team during the 1960s and 1970s, making his debut in the 1962 Europe Zone first round tie against New Zealand. His last Davis Cup appearance was seventeen years later, in 1979 against Italy. During his Davis Cup career, he won 3 of the 19 singles matches and 1 of the 6 doubles matches that he played.

During 1963, Hedelund made his only appearance in the singles main draw of a Grand Slam tournament, when he lost in the first round of the US Open to Lee Fentress. At the 1963 Wimbledon Championships, he and Pia Balling reached the third round in the Mixed Doubles.

== See also ==
- List of Denmark Davis Cup team representatives
