= Bozhidar Pampoulov =

Bulgarian tennis player

- Country (sports): Bulgaria
- Born: 29 April 1949 (age 77) Plovdiv, Bulgaria
- Plays: Left-handed

Singles
- Career record: 2–4
- Highest ranking: No. 358 (4 January 1982)

Grand Slam singles results
- French Open: Q2 (1975)
- Wimbledon: Q1 (1973)

Doubles
- Career record: 1–3
- Highest ranking: No. 520 (26 November 1984)

Grand Slam doubles results
- Wimbledon: 1R (1973)
Medal record
Representing Bulgaria
Summer Universiade
Silver medal – second place	1973 Moscow	Doubles
Bronze medal – third place	1977 Sofia	Doubles

Bozhidar Pampoulov (Bulgarian: Божидар Пампулов; born 29 April 1949) is a Bulgarian former professional tennis player.

== Biography ==
Born in Plovdiv, Pampoulov was a regular member of the Bulgaria Davis Cup team from 1967 to 1982, featuring in 17 Davis Cup ties. He played most of his doubles rubbers with his twin brother Matei, who he would partner in tournaments throughout his career. They went 5–9 in Davis Cup doubles matches together, a Bulgarian record for wins.

Pampoulov made appearances in the qualifying draws for the French Open and Wimbledon during the 1970s.

At 31 years old, he made his ATP debut at the 1980 Sofia Open. He was also a quarterfinalist at the Sofia Open in the next 1981 edition, which was his best performance in a Grand Prix tournament.

Both his son Luben and niece Elena were professional tennis players.
