= Båstad Tennis Stadium =

Tennis stadium in Båstad, Sweden

Coordinates: 56°26′05″N 12°50′18″E

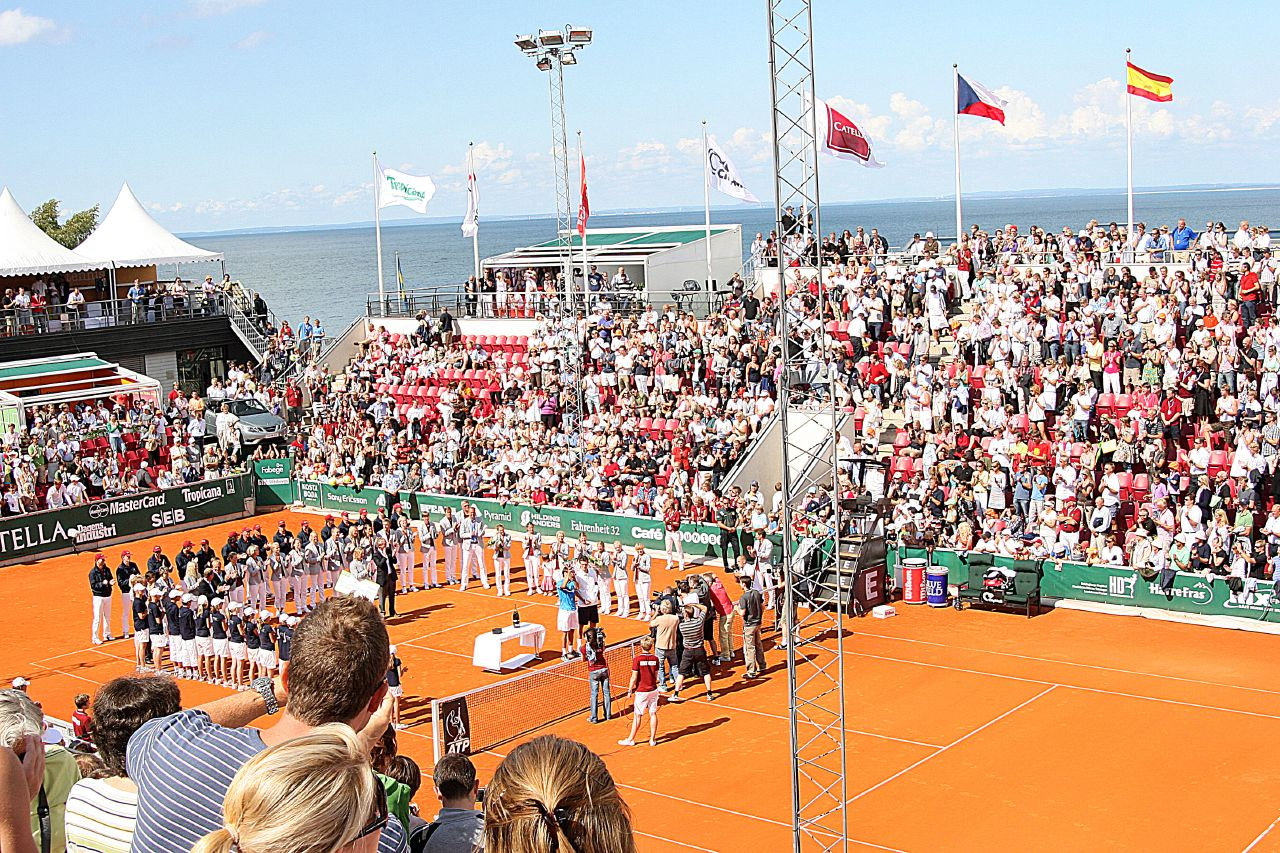
- Bastad Tennis Stadium during the Swedish Open in July 2008
- Interactive map of Båstad Tennis Stadium
- Location: Båstad; Sweden
- Owner: Båstad Municipality
- Capacity: 5,000 (tennis)
- Surface: Clay

Construction
- Opened: 1907

Tenants
- Swedish Open (men's and women's) (Tennis) (1996–present)

The Båstad Tennis Stadium (Swedish: Båstads tennisstadion) is a tennis complex in Båstad, Sweden. Since its opening, the venue has been the host of the annual men's 250 series tournament, the Swedish Open. Since 2009, the venue has hosted the women's tournament. Båstad Tennis Stadium has a capacity of 5,000.

The history of the Båstad Tennis Stadium can be traced back to 1907, when the first tennis courts at what is known as Båstad Tennis Stadium were built. In 2001, the Båstad Tennis Stadium was renovated.
