= Fred Hemmes Sr. =

Dutch tennis player

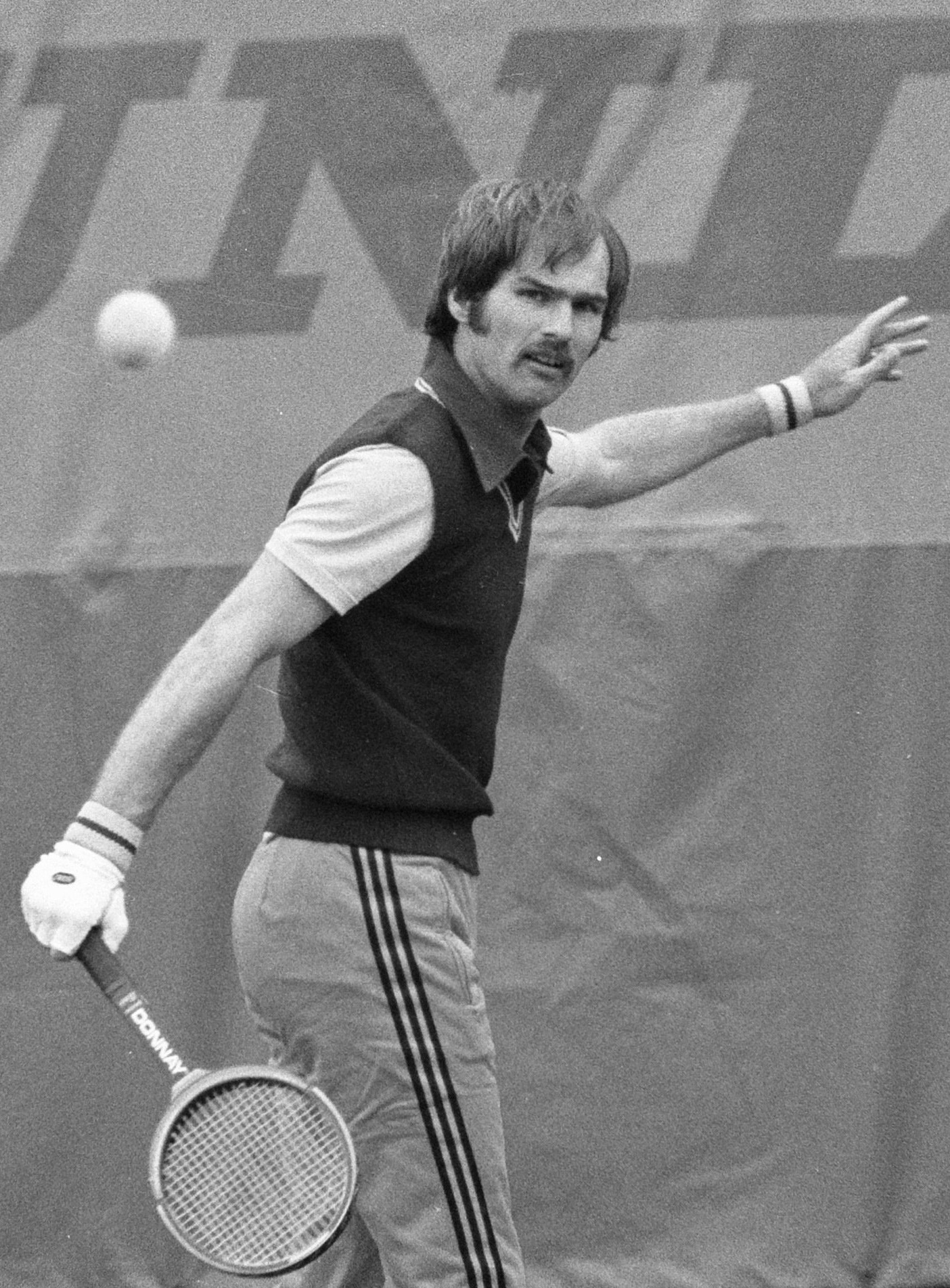
- Fred Hemmes in 1977
- Country (sports): Netherlands
- Born: 14 June 1950 (age 74); The Hague, Netherlands

Singles
- Career record: 4–10
- Career titles: 0
- Highest ranking: No. 264 (12 Dec 1976)

Doubles

Grand Slam doubles results
- Wimbledon: 1R (1973)

Mixed doubles

Grand Slam mixed doubles results
- Wimbledon: 2R (1973)

Fred Hemmes Sr. (born 14 June 1950) is a former professional tennis player from the Netherlands. His son, Fred Hemmes Jr., also had a career as a tennis player.

== Career ==
Hemmes played Davis Cup tennis for the Netherlands from 1971 to 1977. He featured in eight ties and won seven of his 18 matches, four in singles and three in doubles. His matches included singles rubbers against Björn Borg and Ilie Năstase.

The Dutchman appeared in both the men's doubles and mixed doubles main draws at the 1973 Wimbledon Championships, partnering Jan Hordijk and Tine Zwaan respectively. He also took part in the 1974 Wimbledon mixed doubles, with Nora Lauteslager.

He had his best performance on tour in the 1976 Dutch Open, where, despite entering the tournament as a lucky loser, he was able to defeat top seed Wojtek Fibak in the opening round.
