= 1969 Wimbledon Championships – Women's singles qualifying =

Women's singles qualifying
- 1969 Wimbledon Championships

Events
Singles	men	women		boys	girls
Doubles	men	women	mixed	boys	girls
WC Singles	men	women	quad
WC Doubles	men	women	quad
Legends	men	women	seniors

Qualification
Singles	men	women
Doubles	men	women	mixed
- Wimbledon Championships

Players who neither had high enough rankings nor received wild cards to enter the main draw of the annual Wimbledon Tennis Championships participated in a qualifying tournament held one week before the event.

== Qualifiers ==
1. (United Kingdom) Elizabeth Ernest
2. (United States) Julie Anthony
3. (South Africa) Julie Wilshere
4. (United Kingdom) Wendy Hall
5. (Indonesia) Lita Liem Sugiarto
6. (United States) Pam Teeguarden
7. (Indonesia) Lany Kaligis
8. (United Kingdom) Marian Boundy

== Lucky losers ==
1. (Netherlands) Tine Zwaan

== Qualifying draw ==
Key

- Q = Qualifier
- WC = Wild card
- LL = Lucky loser
- Alt = Alternate
- ITF = ITF entry
- PR = Protected ranking
- SR = Special ranking
- SE = Special exempt
- JE = Junior exempt
- JR = Junior Accelerator Programme entrant
- CO = College Accelerator Programme entrant
- NG = Next Gen Accelerator Program entrant
- w/o = Walkover
- r = Retired
- d = Defaulted

=== First qualifier ===
First round
1	(South Africa) Gillian Dove	6	6
8	(United Kingdom) Jean Fyfe	4	4
4	(United Kingdom) Diane Bridger	6	8
5	(Argentina) Ana Cavadini	1	6
2	(United Kingdom) Elizabeth Ernest	6	6
7	(United Kingdom) Penny Hardgrave	4	4
3	(Belgium) Monique Van Haver	3	6	6
6	(United Kingdom) Jackie Pallister	6	4	0

Second round
(South Africa) Gillian Dove	9	6
(United Kingdom) Diane Bridger	7	3
(United Kingdom) Elizabeth Ernest	6	6
(Belgium) Monique Van Haver	2	1

Qualifying competition
(South Africa) Gillian Dove	4	4
(United Kingdom) Elizabeth Ernest	6	6

=== Second qualifier ===
First round
1	(United States) Julie Anthony	6	6
8	(Australia) Sue Hole	0	2
4	(United Kingdom) Ruth Illingworth	6	6
5	(New Zealand) Beverley Vercoe	3	4
2	(Sweden) Madelaine Pegel	6	7
7	(United Kingdom) Dianne Oakley	3	5
3	(United Kingdom) Mary McAnally	6	6
6	(Canada) Andrée Martin	4	4

Second round
(United States) Julie Anthony	6	3	6
(United Kingdom) Ruth Illingworth	1	6	3
(Sweden) Madelaine Pegel	6	3	6
(United Kingdom) Mary McAnally	1	6	3

Qualifying competition
(United States) Julie Anthony	6	6
(Sweden) Madelaine Pegel	1	2

=== Third qualifier ===
First round
1	(United Kingdom) Jane Poynder	6	6
8	(France) P. Proisy	1	0
4	(United Kingdom) J.N. Rickson	8	7
5	(United Kingdom) L. Wellerman	6	5
2	(South Africa) Julie Wilshere	3	6	6
7	(United States) Maricaye Christenson	6	3	4
3	(United Kingdom) Veronica Burton	6	6
6	(Canada) Janice Tindle	4	4

Second round
(United Kingdom) Jane Poynder	6	6
(United Kingdom) J.N. Rickson	4	4
(South Africa) Julie Wilshere	0	8	8
(United Kingdom) Veronica Burton	6	6	6

Qualifying competition
(United Kingdom) Jane Poynder	4	1
(South Africa) Julie Wilshere	6	6

=== Fourth qualifier ===
First round
1	(United Kingdom) Wendy Hall	6	6
8	(Spain) María-José Aubet	4	4
4	(United Kingdom) Jenny Helliar	6	6
5	(United Kingdom) Marilyn Bevan	1	3
2	(Netherlands) Elsie Veentjer	7	6
7	(United Kingdom) J.E. McFarlane	5	3
3	(United States) Judy Dixon	6	3	8
6	(Japan) Yaeko Matsuda	1	6	6

Second round
(United Kingdom) Wendy Hall	6	7
(United Kingdom) Jenny Helliar	4	5
(Netherlands) Elsie Veentjer	6	6
(United States) Judy Dixon	1	1

Qualifying competition
(United Kingdom) Wendy Hall	6	6
(Netherlands) Elsie Veentjer	2	4

=== Fifth qualifier ===
First round
1	(United Kingdom) Lindsey Beaven	6	6
8	(France) Odile de Roubin	2	1
4	(United Kingdom) Binnie Orchard	1	6	6
5	(United States) Julie Davenport	6	3	4
2	(Indonesia) Lita Liem Sugiarto	6	6
7	(New Zealand) Cynthia Fleming	0	2
3	(United Kingdom) M.E. Headifen	6	3	6
6	(Canada) Jane O'Hara	2	6	3

Second round
(United Kingdom) Lindsey Beaven	6	6
(United Kingdom) Binnie Orchard	3	1
(Indonesia) Lita Liem Sugiarto	6	6
(United Kingdom) M.E. Headifen	2	1

Qualifying competition
(United Kingdom) Lindsey Beaven	4	2
(Indonesia) Lita Liem Sugiarto	6	6

=== Sixth qualifier ===
First round
1	(United States) Pam Teeguarden	6	6
8	(United Kingdom) Sue Morgan	0	0
4	(Japan) Kimiyo Hatanaka	8	6
5	(Sweden) U. Standulf	6	1
2	(Switzerland) Anne-Marie Studer	6	6
7	(United Kingdom) Janet Ward	2	2
3	(United Kingdom) Lorna Cawthorn	6	6
6	(United States) Roylee Bailey	1	1

Second round
(United States) Pam Teeguarden	6	3	7
(Japan) Kimiyo Hatanaka	2	6	5
(Switzerland) Anne-Marie Studer	7	6
(United Kingdom) Lorna Cawthorn	5	4

Qualifying competition
(United States) Pam Teeguarden	6	6
(Switzerland) Anne-Marie Studer	1	3

=== Seventh qualifier ===
First round
1	(Indonesia) Lany Kaligis	6	4	6
8	(United Kingdom) Margaret Lee	3	6	4
4	(Soviet Union) Zaiga Jansone	8	6
5	(France) Maylis Burel	6	4
2	(Sweden) Margareta Strandberg	6	6
7	(United Kingdom) Anthea Rigby	3	3
3	(United States) J. Evans	6	6
6	(United Kingdom) Sue Mappin	3	2

Second round
(Indonesia) Lany Kaligis	9	6
(Soviet Union) Zaiga Jansone	7	2
(Sweden) Margareta Strandberg	6	6
(United States) J. Evans	3	3

Qualifying competition
(Indonesia) Lany Kaligis	6	6
(Sweden) Margareta Strandberg	1	3

=== Eighth qualifier ===
First round
1	(United Kingdom) Marian Boundy	9	2	6
8	(United States) Dorothy Head Knode	7	6	3
4	(United Kingdom) Carolyn Camp	2	6	6
5	(Finland) Kastehelmi Vihko	6	1	2
2	(Netherlands) Tine Zwaan	6	6
7	(Norway) E. Grundvold	2	3
3	(United Kingdom) Sandra Okin	9	1	6
6	(Japan) Junko Sawamatsu	7	6	3

Second round
(United Kingdom) Marian Boundy	7	6
(United Kingdom) Carolyn Camp	5	1
(Netherlands) Tine Zwaan	6	4	8
(United Kingdom) Sandra Okin	3	6	6

Qualifying competition
(United Kingdom) Marian Boundy	7	6
(Netherlands) Tine Zwaan	5	2
