= John Newcombe career statistics =

Newcombe at Wimbledon

The career of Australian former tennis player John Newcombe started in 1960 and lasted until his official retirement in 1981. During his career he won 7 singles titles at Grand Slam championships as well as 17 doubles and 2 mixed doubles titles. He played as an amateur from 1960 until January 1968 when he joined Lamar Hunt's World Championship Tennis (WCT) professional circuit. During the Open Era of tennis which started in April 1968 he won 41 singles and 33 doubles titles. He competed in 15 ties for the Australian Davis Cup team between 1963 and 1976 and was a member of the Davis Cup winning team in 1964, 1965, 1966, 1967 and 1973. Newcombe reached the No. 1 ranking in singles on June 3, 1974, and held that position for 8 weeks.

== Grand Slam finals ==
=== Singles: 10 (7 titles / 3 runner-ups) ===
Result	Year	Championship	Surface	Opponent	Score
Loss	1966	U.S. Championships	Grass	(Australia) Fred Stolle	6–4, 10–12, 3–6, 4–6
Win	1967	Wimbledon	Grass	(West Germany) Wilhelm Bungert	6–2, 6–1, 6–1
Win	1967	U.S. Championships	Grass	(United States) Clark Graebner	6–4, 6–4, 8–6
↓ Open Era ↓
Loss	1969	Wimbledon	Grass	(Australia) Rod Laver	4–6, 7–5, 4–6, 4–6
Win	1970	Wimbledon	Grass	(Australia) Ken Rosewall	5–7, 6–3, 6–2, 3–6, 6–1
Win	1971	Wimbledon	Grass	(United States) Stan Smith	6–3, 5–7, 2–6, 6–4, 6–4
Win	1973	Australian Open	Grass	(New Zealand) Onny Parun	6–3, 6–7, 7–5, 6–1
Win	1973	US Open	Grass	(Czechoslovakia) Jan Kodeš	6–4, 1–6, 4–6, 6–2, 6–3
Win	1975	Australian Open	Grass	(United States) Jimmy Connors	7–5, 3–6, 6–4, 7–6
Loss	1976	Australian Open	Grass	(Australia) Mark Edmondson	7–6, 3–6, 6–7, 1–6

=== Doubles : 21 (17 titles / 4 runner-ups) ===
Result	Year	Championship	Partner	Opponents	Score
Loss	1963	Australian Championships	(Australia) Ken Fletcher	(Australia) Bob Hewitt (Australia) Fred Stolle	2–6, 6–3, 3–6, 6–3, 3–6
Loss	1964	French Championships	(Australia) Tony Roche	(Australia) Roy Emerson (Australia) Ken Fletcher	5–7, 3–6, 6–3, 5–7
Win	1965	Australian Championships	(Australia) Tony Roche	(Australia) Roy Emerson (Australia) Fred Stolle	3–6, 4–6, 13–11, 6–3, 6–4
Win	1965	Wimbledon	(Australia) Tony Roche	(Australia) Ken Fletcher (South Africa) Bob Hewitt	7–5, 6–3, 6–4
Loss	1966	Australian Championships (2)	(Australia) Tony Roche	(Australia) Roy Emerson (Australia) Fred Stolle	9–7, 3–6, 8–6, 12–14, 10–12
Win	1966	Wimbledon (2)	(Australia) Ken Fletcher	(Australia) Bill Bowrey (Australia) Owen Davidson	6–3, 6–4, 3–6, 6–3
Win	1967	Australian Championships (2)	(Australia) Tony Roche	(Australia) Bill Bowrey (Australia) Owen Davidson	3–6, 6–3, 7–5, 6–8, 8–6
Win	1967	French Championships	(Australia) Tony Roche	(Australia) Roy Emerson (Australia) Ken Fletcher	6–3, 9–7, 12–10
Win	1967	U.S. Championships	(Australia) Tony Roche	(Australia) Bill Bowrey (Australia) Owen Davidson	6–8, 9–7, 6–3, 6–3
↓ Open Era ↓
Win	1968	Wimbledon (3)	(Australia) Tony Roche	(Australia) Ken Fletcher (Australia) Ken Rosewall	3–6, 8–6, 5–7, 14–12, 6–3
Win	1969	French Open (2)	(Australia) Tony Roche	(Australia) Roy Emerson (Australia) Rod Laver	4–6, 6–1, 3–6, 6–4, 6–4
Win	1969	Wimbledon (4)	(Australia) Tony Roche	(Netherlands) Tom Okker (United States) Marty Riessen	7–5, 11–9, 6–3
Win	1970	Wimbledon (5)	(Australia) Tony Roche	(Australia) Ken Rosewall (Australia) Fred Stolle	10–8, 6–3, 6–1
Win	1971	Australian Open (3)	(Australia) Tony Roche	(Netherlands) Tom Okker (United States) Marty Riessen	6–2, 7–6
Win	1971	US Open (2)	(United Kingdom) Roger Taylor	(United States) Stan Smith (United States) Erik van Dillen	6–7, 6–3, 7–6, 4–6, (5–3)*
Loss	1972	US Open	(Australia) Owen Davidson	(South Africa) Cliff Drysdale (United Kingdom) Roger Taylor	4–6, 6–7, 3–6
Win	1973	Australian Open (4)	(Australia) Mal Anderson	(United States) John Alexander (Australia) Phil Dent	6–3, 6–4, 7–6
Win	1973	US Open (3)	(Australia) Owen Davidson	(Australia) Rod Laver (Australia) Ken Rosewall	7–5, 2–6, 7–5, 7–5
Win	1973	French Open (3)	(Netherlands) Tom Okker	(United States) Jimmy Connors (Romania) Ilie Năstase	6–1, 3–6, 6–3, 5–7, 6–4
Win	1974	Wimbledon (6)	(Australia) Tony Roche	(United States) Bob Lutz (United States) Stan Smith	8–6, 6–4, 6–4
Win	1976	Australian Open (5)	(Australia) Tony Roche	(Australia) Ross Case (Australia) Geoff Masters	7–6, 6–4

- A sudden-death tie-break instead of fifth set

=== Mixed doubles: 3 (2 titles / 1 runner-up) ===
Result	Year	Championship	Partner	Opponents	Score
Win	1964	US Championships	(Australia) Margaret Court	(Australia) Judy Tegart (United States) Ed Rubinoff	10–8, 4–6, 6–3
Win	1965	Australian Championships	(Australia) Margaret Court	(Australia) Robyn Ebbern (Australia) Owen Davidson	Shared championship (Final not played)
Loss	1965	French Championships	(Brazil) Maria Bueno	(Australia) Margaret Court (Australia) Ken Fletcher	4–6, 4–6

== Open Era finals ==
=== Singles: 71 (41 titles / 30 runner-ups) ===
Result	W-L	Date	Tournament	Surface	Opponent	Score
Loss	0–1	Feb 1968	New Orleans WCT, US	Carpet (i)	(South Africa) Cliff Drysdale	28–31
Win	1–1	Apr 1968	Bakersfield WCT, US	Carpet (i)	(South Africa) Cliff Drysdale	31–12, 31–22
Win	2–1	Apr 1968	Evansville WCT, US	Carpet (i)	(Socialist Federal Republic of Yugoslavia) Nikola Pilić	31–17, 31–17
Loss	2–2	May 1968	Minneapolis WCT, US	Carpet (i)	(United States) Dennis Ralston	26–31, 31–19, 4–5
Loss	2–3	Jun 1968 (Note: The final was postponed due to rain and as the players had to leave for England to play tournaments, including Wimbledon, it was rescheduled and played on 10 September.)	Boston, US	Grass	(Australia) Rod Laver	4–6, 4–6, 7–9
Loss	2–4	Jul 1968	Paris-2, France	Clay	(Australia) Rod Laver	2–6, 2–6, 3–6
Win	3–4	Aug 1968	Cannes WCT, US	Hard (i)	(United States) Marty Riessen	7–5, 6–2
Win	4–4	Aug 1968	Hamburg, Germany	Clay	(South Africa) Cliff Drysdale	6–3, 6–2, 6–4
Win	5–4	Sep 1968	Pretoria WCT, South Africa	Hard	(Australia) Tony Roche	11–9, 4–6, 6–3
Win	6–4	Oct 1968	Durban WCT, South Africa	Hard	(Australia) Tony Roche	6–3, 6–4
Win	7–4	Oct 1968	East London WCT, South Africa	Hard	(South Africa) Cliff Drysdale	10–6
Win	8–4	Oct 1968	Kimberley WCT, South Africa	Hard	(Australia) Tony Roche	10–6
Loss	8–5	Nov 1968	Vienna WCT, Austria	Hard (i)	(Australia) Tony Roche	4–6, 5–7
Loss	8–6	Nov 1968	Wembley-3, UK	Hard (i)	(Australia) Ken Rosewall	4–6, 6–4, 5–7, 4–6
Loss	8–7	Apr 1969	Monte Carlo, Monaco	Clay	(Netherlands) Tom Okker	10–8, 1–6, 5–7, 3–6
Win	9–7	Apr 1969	Rome, Italy	Clay	(Australia) Tony Roche	6–3, 4–6, 6–2, 5–7, 6–3
Win	10–7	May 1969	Bournemouth, UK	Clay	(South Africa) Bob Hewitt	6–8, 6–3, 5–7, 6–4, 6–4
Loss	10–8	Jun 1969	Queen's Club, London	Grass	(Australia) Fred Stolle	3–6, 20–22
Loss	10–9	Jul 1969	Wimbledon, London	Grass	(Australia) Rod Laver	4–6, 7–5, 4–6, 4–6
Loss	10–10	Jul 1969	Boston, US	Hard	(Australia) Rod Laver	5–7, 2–6, 6–4, 1–6
Loss	10–11	Sep 1969	Atlanta, US	Hard	(United States) Butch Buchholz	4–6, 7–5, 4–6, 7–5, 2–6
Loss	10–12	Jan 1970	Australian Pro	Hard	(Australia) Tony Roche	7–5, 5–7, 5–7
Win	11–12	Jan 1970	Melbourne, Australia	Grass	(Australia) Tony Roche	6–4, 6–4, 4–6, ret.
Loss	11–13	Feb 1970	Corpus Christi WCT, US	Hard	(Australia) Ken Rosewall	2–6, 0–6
Win	12–13	Jun 1970	Casablanca WCT, Morocco	Clay	(Spain) Andrés Gimeno	6–4, 6–4, 6–4
Loss	12–14	Jun 1970	Queen's Club, London	Grass	(Australia) Rod Laver	4–6, 3–6
Win	13–14	Jul 1970	Wimbledon, London	Grass	(Australia) Ken Rosewall	5–7, 6–3, 6–2, 3–6, 6–1
Loss	13–15	Jul 1970	Newport, UK	Grass	(Australia) Ken Rosewall	4–6, 4–6
Win	14–15	Jul 1970	Hoylake, UK	Grass	(Australia) Owen Davidson	4–6, 9–7, 6–4
Loss	14–16	Aug 1970	Louisville, US	Clay	(Australia) Rod Laver	3–6, 3–6
Loss	14–17	Sep 1970	Los Angeles, US	Hard	(Australia) Rod Laver	6–4, 4–6, 6–7^{(5–7)}
Loss	14–18	Oct 1970	Midland WCT, US	Carpet	(United Kingdom) Roger Taylor	6–2, 6–7, 1–6
Win	15–18	Feb 1971	Philadelphia WCT, US	Carpet (i)	(Australia) Rod Laver	7–6^{(7–5)}, 7–6^{(7–1)}, 6–4
Win	16–18	Mar 1971	Chicago WCT, US	Carpet (i)	(United States) Arthur Ashe	4–6, 7–6, 6–2, 6–3
Win	17–18	May 1971	Dallas WCT, US	Carpet (i)	(United States) Arthur Ashe	7–6, 6–4
Loss	17–19	Jun 1971	Queen's Club, London	Grass	(United States) Stan Smith	6–8, 3–6
Win	18–19	Jul 1971	Wimbledon, London	Grass	(United States) Stan Smith	6–3, 5–7, 2–6, 6–4, 6–4
Win	19–19	Jul 1971	Gstaad, Switzerland	Clay	(Netherlands) Tom Okker	6–2, 5–7, 1–6, 7–5, 6–3
Win	20–19	Aug 1971	Toronto WCT, Canada	Clay	(Netherlands) Tom Okker	7–6, 3–6, 6–2, 7–6
Loss	20–20	Aug 1971	Hilton Head, US	Clay	(Australia) Rod Laver	2–6, 4–6
Loss	20–21	Mar 1972	Hilton Head WCT, US	Clay	(Australia) Ken Rosewall	5–7, 3–6
Win	21–21	May 1972	Las Vegas WCT, US	Hard	(South Africa) Cliff Drysdale	6–3, 6–4
Win	22–21	Jul 1972	St. Louis WCT, US	Hard	(Socialist Federal Republic of Yugoslavia) Nikola Pilić	6–3, 6–3
Win	23–21	Aug 1972	Fort Worth WCT, US	Hard	(Australia) Ken Rosewall	5–7, 1–6, 7–5, 6–4, 6–4
Win	24–21	Oct 1972	Alamo WCT, US	Hard	(South Africa) Cliff Drysdale	6–1, 6–1, 7–5
Win	25–21	Oct 1972	Vancouver WCT, Canada	Carpet (i)	(United States) Marty Riessen	6–7^{(5–7)}, 7–6^{(7–5)}, 7–6^{(14–12)}, 7–5
Win	26–21	Nov 1972	Gothenburg WCT, Sweden	Carpet (i)	(Australia) Roy Emerson	6–0, 6–3, 6–1
Win	27–21	Dec 1972	Johannesburg, South Africa	Hard	(Australia) John Alexander	6–1, 7–6
Win	28–21	Jan 1973	Australian Open, Melbourne	Grass	(New Zealand) Onny Parun	6–3, 6–7, 7–5, 6–1
Loss	28–22	Aug 1973	Louisville, US	Clay	(Spain) Manuel Orantes	6–3, 3–6, 4–6
Win	29–22	Sep 1973	US Open, New York	Grass	(Czechoslovakia) Jan Kodeš	6–4, 1–6, 4–6, 6–2, 6–3
Win	30–22	Sep 1973	Colombia, US	Carpet (i)	(United States) Dick Stockton	6–4, 6–3
Loss	30–23	Sep 1973	Chicago, US	Hard (i)	(Netherlands) Tom Okker	6–3, 6–7, 3–6
Loss	30–24	Oct 1973	Tokyo, Japan	Clay	(Australia) Ken Rosewall	1–6, 4–6
Loss	30–25	Oct 1973	Tehran, Iran	Clay	(Mexico) Raúl Ramírez	7–6, 1–6, 5–7, 3–6
Win	31–25	Nov 1973	Jakarta, Indonesia	Hard	(Australia) Ross Case	7–6, 7–6, 6–3
Loss	31–26	Nov 1973	Sydney Indoor, Australia	Hard (i)	(Australia) Rod Laver	6–3, 5–7, 3–6, 6–3, 4–6
Win	32–26	Feb 1974	St. Petersburg WCT, US	Carpet (i)	(Soviet Union) Alex Metreveli	6–0, 7–6^{(7–3)}
Loss	32–27	Feb 1974	Hempstead WCT, US	Carpet (i)	(United States) Stan Smith	4–6, 6–3, 3–6
Win	33–27	Mar 1974	La Costa WCT, US	Hard	(United States) Stan Smith	6–2, 4–6, 6–4
Win	34–27	Mar 1974	Tucson, US	Hard	(United States) Arthur Ashe	6–3, 7–6
Win	35–27	Apr 1974	New Orleans WCT, US	Carpet (i)	(United States) Jeff Borowiak	6–4, 6–2
Win	36–27	Apr 1974	Orlando WCT, US	Hard	(Chile) Jaime Fillol	6–2, 3–6, 6–3
Win	37–27	May 1974	Dallas WCT, US	Carpet (i)	(Sweden) Björn Borg	4–6, 6–3, 6–3, 6–2
Win	38–27	Oct 1974	Maui, US	Hard	(United States) Roscoe Tanner	7–6, 7–6
Win	39–27	Oct 1974	Tokyo, Japan	Clay	(Australia) Ken Rosewall	3–6, 6–2, 6–3
Win	40–27	Oct 1974	Sydney Indoor, Australia	Hard (i)	(United States) Cliff Richey	6–4, 6–3, 6–4
Win	41–27	Jan 1975	Australian Open, Melbourne	Grass	(United States) Jimmy Connors	7–5, 3–6, 6–4, 7–6^{(9–7)}
Loss	41–28	Jan 1976	Australian Open, Melbourne	Grass	(Australia) Mark Edmondson	7–6, 3–6, 6–7, 1–6
Loss	41–29	Feb 1978	Richmond WCT, US	Carpet (i)	(United States) Vitas Gerulaitis	3–6, 4–6
Loss	41–30	Apr 1978	Guadalajara, Mexico	Clay	(United States) Gene Mayer	3–6, 4–6

Source: ATP

=== Doubles: 55 (33 titles / 22 runner-ups) ===
Result	W-L	Date	Tournament	Surface	Partner	Opponents	Score
Win	1–0	Jul 1968	Wimbledon, London	Grass	(Australia) Tony Roche	(Australia) Ken Rosewall (Australia) Fred Stolle	3–6, 8–6, 5–7, 14–12, 6–3
Win	2–0	Jul 1968	Gstaad, Switzerland	Clay	(United States) Dennis Ralston	(Australia) Mal Anderson (Netherlands) Tom Okker	8–10, 12–10, 12–14, 6–3, 6–3
Loss	2–1	Aug 1968	Hamburg, Germany	Clay	(Australia) Tony Roche	(Netherlands) Tom Okker (United States) Marty Riessen	4–6, 4–6, 5–7
Loss	2–2	Feb 1969	Philadelphia WCT, US	Carpet (i)	(Australia) Tony Roche	(Netherlands) Tom Okker (United States) Marty Riessen	6–8, 4–6
Win	3–2	Apr 1969	Monte Carlo, Monaco	Clay	(Australia) Owen Davidson	(United States) Pancho Gonzales (United States) Dennis Ralston	7–5, 11–13, 6–2, 6–1
Win	4–2	Jun 1969	French Open, Paris	Clay	(Australia) Tony Roche	(Australia) Roy Emerson (Australia) Rod Laver	4–6, 6–1, 3–6, 6–4, 6–4
Win	5–2	Jul 1969	Wimbledon, London	Grass	(Australia) Tony Roche	(Netherlands) Tom Okker (United States) Marty Riessen	7–5, 11–9, 6–3
Win	6–2	Aug 1969	Toronto, Canada	Clay	(United States) Ron Holmberg	(United States) Butch Buchholz (South Africa) Raymond Moore	6–3, 6–4
Win	7–2	Jun 1970	St. Louis WCT, US	Carpet (i)	(Spain) Andrés Gimeno	(Australia) Roy Emerson (Australia) Rod Laver	6–4, 6–0
Win	8–2	Jul 1970	Wimbledon, London	Grass	(Australia) Tony Roche	(Australia) Ken Rosewall (Australia) Fred Stolle	10–8, 6–3, 6–1
Win	9–2	Aug 1970	Louisville, US	Hard	(Australia) Tony Roche	(Australia) Roy Emerson (Australia) Rod Laver	8–6, 5–7, 6–4
Win	10–2	Mar 1971	Australian Open, Melbourne	Grass	(Australia) Tony Roche	(Netherlands) Tom Okker (United States) Marty Riessen	6–2, 7–6
Loss	10–3	Mar 1971	Chicago WCT, US	Carpet (i)	(Australia) Tony Roche	(Netherlands) Tom Okker (United States) Marty Riessen	6–7, 6–4, 6–7
Win	11–3	Apr 1971	Miami WCT, US	Hard	(Australia) Tony Roche	(Australia) Roy Emerson (Australia) Rod Laver	7–6, 7–6
Win	12–3	May 1971	Rome, Italy	Clay	(Australia) Tony Roche	(Spain) Andrés Gimeno (United Kingdom) Roger Taylor	6–4, 6–4
Win	13–3	May 1971	Tehran WCT, Iran	Clay	(Australia) Tony Roche	(Australia) Bob Carmichael (Australia) Ray Ruffels	6–4, 6–7, 6–1
Loss	13–4	Jul 1971	Gstaad, Switzerland	Clay	(Netherlands) Tom Okker	(Australia) John Alexander (Australia) Phil Dent	7–5, 3–6, 4–6
Win	14–4	Sep 1971	US Open, New York	Grass	(United Kingdom) Roger Taylor	(United States) Stan Smith (United States) Erik van Dillen	6–7, 6–3, 7–6, 4–6, 7–6
Loss	14–5	Feb 1972	Richmond WCT, US	Carpet (i)	(Australia) Tony Roche	(Netherlands) Tom Okker (United States) Marty Riessen	6–7, 6–7
Loss	14–6	Feb 1972	Philadelphia WCT, US	Carpet (i)	(Australia) Tony Roche	(United States) Arthur Ashe (United States) Robert Lutz	3–6, 7–6, 3–6
Loss	14–7	Apr 1972	Charlotte WCT, US	Clay	(Australia) Tony Roche	(Netherlands) Tom Okker (United States) Marty Riessen	4–6, 6–4, 6–7
Loss	14–8	May 1972	Las Vegas WCT, US	Hard	(Australia) Tony Roche	(Australia) Roy Emerson (Australia) Rod Laver	def.
Win	15–8	Jul 1972	St. Louis WCT, US	Carpet (i)	(Australia) Tony Roche	(Australia) John Alexander (Australia) Phil Dent	7–6, 6–2
Loss	15–9	Jul 1972	Washington WCT, US	Clay	(Australia) Tony Roche	(Netherlands) Tom Okker (United States) Marty Riessen	6–3, 3–6, 2–6
Win	16–9	Aug 1972	Boston WCT, US	Hard	(Australia) Tony Roche	(United States) Arthur Ashe (United States) Robert Lutz	6–3, 1–6, 7–6
Loss	16–10	Sep 1972	US Open, New York	Grass	(Australia) Owen Davidson	(South Africa) Cliff Drysdale (United Kingdom) Roger Taylor	4–6, 6–7, 4–6
Win	17–10	Oct 1972	Vancouver WCT, Canada	Hard	(Australia) Fred Stolle	(South Africa) Cliff Drysdale (Australia) Allan Stone	7–6, 6–0
Win	18–10	Nov 1972	Rotterdam WCT, Netherlands	Carpet (i)	(Australia) Roy Emerson	(United States) Arthur Ashe (United States) Robert Lutz	6–2, 6–3
Win	19–10	Dec 1972	Johannesburg, South Africa	Hard	(Australia) Fred Stolle	(Australia) Terry Addison (Australia) Bob Carmichael	6–3, 6–4
Win	20–10	Jan 1973	Australian Open, Melbourne	Hard	(Australia) Mal Anderson	(Australia) John Alexander (Australia) Phil Dent	6–3, 6–4, 7–6
Win	21–10	Jun 1973	French Open, Paris	Clay	(Netherlands) Tom Okker	(United States) Jimmy Connors (Romania) Ilie Năstase	6–1, 3–6, 6–3, 5–7, 6–4
Win	22–10	Jun 1973	Rome Masters, Italy	Clay	(Netherlands) Tom Okker	(Australia) Ross Case (Australia) Geoff Masters	6–2, 6–3, 6–4
Loss	22–11	Aug 1973	Louisville, US	Clay	(United States) Clark Graebner	(Spain) Manuel Orantes (Romania) Ion Țiriac	6–0, 4–6, 3–6
Loss	22–12	Aug 1973	Toronto, Canada	Hard	(Australia) Owen Davidson	(Australia) Rod Laver (Australia) Ken Rosewall	5–7, 6–7
Win	23–12	Sep 1973	US Open, New York	Grass	(Australia) Owen Davidson	(Australia) Rod Laver (Australia) Ken Rosewall	7–5, 2–6, 7–5, 7–5
Win	24–12	Sep 1973	Chicago, US	Carpet (i)	(Australia) Owen Davidson	(United Kingdom) Gerald Battrick (United Kingdom) Graham Stilwell	6–7, 7–6, 7–6
Loss	24–13	Oct 1973	Fort Worth, US	Hard	(Australia) Owen Davidson	(United States) Brian Gottfried (United States) Dick Stockton	6–7, 4–6
Win	25–13	Oct 1973	Tehran, Iran	Clay	(Australia) Rod Laver	(Australia) Ross Case (Australia) Geoff Masters	7–6, 6–2
Loss	25–14	Nov 1973	Jakarta, Indonesia	Hard	(Australia) Allan Stone	(United States) Mike Estep (Australia) Ian Fletcher	5–7, 4–6
Win	26–14	Nov 1973	Sydney Indoor, Australia	Hard (i)	(Australia) Rod Laver	(Australia) Mal Anderson (Australia) Ken Rosewall	7–6, 6–2
Win	27–14	Feb 1974	St. Petersburg WCT, US	Hard	(Australia) Owen Davidson	(United States) Clark Graebner (United States) Charlie Pasarell	4–6, 6–3, 6–4
Loss	27–15	Apr 1974	New Orleans WCT, US	Carpet (i)	(Australia) Owen Davidson	(United States) Robert Lutz (United States) Stan Smith	6–4, 4–6, 6–7
Win	28–15	Apr 1974	Orlando WCT, US	Hard	(Australia) Owen Davidson	(United States) Brian Gottfried (United States) Dick Stockton	7–6, 6–3
Loss	28–16	Apr 1974	Charlotte, US	Clay	(Australia) Owen Davidson	(United Kingdom) Buster Mottram (Mexico) Raúl Ramírez	3–6, 6–1, 3–6
Loss	28–17	May 1974	World Doubles WCT, Montreal	Carpet (i)	(Australia) Owen Davidson	(South Africa) Bob Hewitt (South Africa) Frew McMillan	2–6, 7–6, 1–6, 2–6
Loss	28–18	May 1974	Las Vegas, US	Hard	(South Africa) Frew McMillan	(Australia) Roy Emerson (Australia) Rod Laver	7–6, 4–6, 4–6
Win	29–18	Jul 1974	Wimbledon, London	Grass	(Australia) Tony Roche	(United States) Robert Lutz (United States) Stan Smith	8–6, 6–4, 6–4
Loss	29–19	Oct 1974	Maui, US	Hard	(Australia) Owen Davidson	(United States) Dick Stockton (United States) Roscoe Tanner	3–6, 6–7
Loss	29–20	Oct 1974	Sydney Indoor, Australia	Hard (i)	(Australia) Tony Roche	(Australia) Ross Case (Australia) Geoff Masters	4–6, 4–6
Win	30–20	Jan 1976	Australian Open, Melbourne	Grass	(Australia) Tony Roche	(Australia) Ross Case (Australia) Geoff Masters	7–6, 6–4
Win	31–20	Apr 1976	Charlotte WCT, US	Carpet (i)	(Australia) Tony Roche	(United States) Vitas Gerulaitis (United States) Gene Mayer	6–3, 7–5
Loss	31–21	May 1976	Rome Masters, Italy	Clay	(Australia) Geoff Masters	(United States) Brian Gottfried (Mexico) Raúl Ramírez	6–7, 7–5, 3–6, 6–3, 3–6
Win	32–21	Oct 1977	Sydney Indoor, Australia	Hard (i)	(Australia) Tony Roche	(Australia) Ross Case (Australia) Geoff Masters	6–7, 6–3, 6–1
Loss	32–22	Mar 1978	Memphis, US	Carpet (i)	(Australia) Phil Dent	(United States) Brian Gottfried (Mexico) Raúl Ramírez	6–3, 6–7, 2–6
Win	33–22	Oct 1978	Sydney Indoor, Australia	Hard (i)	(Australia) Tony Roche	(Australia) Mark Edmondson (Australia) John Marks	6–4, 6–3

Source: ATP

== Grand Slam tournament performance timeline ==
Key
W	F	SF	QF	#R	RR	Q#	DNQ	A	NH

(W) winner; (F) finalist; (SF) semifinalist; (QF) quarterfinalist; (#R) rounds 4, 3, 2, 1; (RR) round-robin stage; (Q#) qualification round; (DNQ) did not qualify; (A) absent; (NH) not held; (SR) strike rate (events won / competed); (W–L) win–loss record.

=== Singles ===
Tournament	1960	1961	1962	1963	1964	1965	1966	1967	1968	1969	1970	1971	1972	1973	1974	1975	1976	1977		1978	SR	W–L	Win %
Australian Open	1R	A	QF	QF	QF	SF	SF	SF	A	QF	QF	3R	QF	W	QF	W	F	A	QF	A	1 / 1	46–14	76.7
French Open	A	3R	3R	2R	2R	QF	3R	4R	A	QF	A	A	A	1R	A	A	1R	A		A	1 / 7	16–10	61.5
Wimbledon	A	1R	2R	1R	1R	4R	3R	W	4R	F	W	W	A	A	QF	A	3R	A		4R	2 / 12	45–11	80.4
US Open	A	A	A	4R	3R	A	F	W	QF	SF	SF	1R	3R	W	SF	A	A	A		A	0 / 6	45–9	83.3
Win–loss	0–1	0–2	5–3	5–4	5–4	10–3	14–4	20–2	7–2	18–4	13–2	8–2	4–2	12–1	12–3	6–0	7–3	3–1		3–1	4 / 26	152–44	77.6

=== Doubles ===
Tournament	1960	1961	1962	1963	1964	1965	1966	1967	1968	1969	1970	1971	1972	1973	1974	1975	1976	1977		1978	SR
Australian Open		A	SF	F	SF	W	F	W	A	SF	QF	W	SF	W	SF	SF	W	A	QF	A	3 / 15
French Open	A				F			W	A	W				W				A		A	3 /
Wimbledon	A	SF	1R	QF	QF	W	W	QF	W	W	W	1R	A	A	W	A	1R	1R		3R	6 / 15
US Open	A	A	A			A		W	QF	QF	2R	W	F	W	SF	A	A	1R		2R	3 /

Source: World Tennis
