= 1970 Wimbledon Championships – Men's singles =

Men's singles
- 1970 Wimbledon Championships

Final
- Champion: (Australia) John Newcombe
- Runner-up: (Australia) Ken Rosewall
- Score: 5–7, 6–3, 6–2, 3–6, 6–1

Details
- Draw: 128 (10 Q )
- Seeds: 16

Events
Singles	men	women		boys	girls
Doubles	men	women	mixed	boys	girls
← 1969 ·	Wimbledon Championships	· 1971 →

John Newcombe defeated Ken Rosewall in the final, 5–7, 6–3, 6–2, 3–6, 6–1 to win the gentlemen's singles tennis title at the 1970 Wimbledon Championships. It was his second Wimbledon singles title and his third major singles title overall. Rosewall was attempting to complete the career Grand Slam.

Rod Laver was the two-time defending champion, but lost in the fourth round to Roger Taylor.

== Seeds ==
1. (Australia) Rod Laver (fourth round)
2. (Australia) John Newcombe (champion)
3. (United States) Arthur Ashe (fourth round)
4. (Australia) Tony Roche (quarterfinals)
5. (Australia) Ken Rosewall (final)
6. (Socialist Federal Republic of Yugoslavia) Željko Franulović (third round)
7. (United States) Stan Smith (fourth round)
8. (Romania) Ilie Năstase (fourth round)
9. (United States) Clark Graebner (quarterfinals)
10. (Australia) Roy Emerson (quarterfinals)
11. (Netherlands) Tom Okker (second round)
12. (South Africa) Cliff Drysdale (third round)
13. (Czechoslovakia) Jan Kodeš (first round)
14. (Spain) Andrés Gimeno (semifinals)
15. (United States) Dennis Ralston (fourth round)
16. (United Kingdom) Roger Taylor (semifinals)

Click on the seed number of a player to go to their draw section.

== Draw ==
=== Key ===
- Q = Qualifier
- WC = Wild card
- LL = Lucky loser
- Alt = Alternate
- ITF = ITF entry
- PR = Protected ranking
- SR = Special ranking
- SE = Special exempt
- JE = Junior exempt
- JR = Junior Accelerator Programme entrant
- CO = College Accelerator Programme entrant
- NG = Next Gen Accelerator Program entrant
- w/o = Walkover
- r = Retired
- d = Defaulted

=== Finals ===
Quarterfinals
16	(United Kingdom) Roger Taylor	6	11	12
9	(United States) Clark Graebner	3	9	10
4	(Australia) Tony Roche	8	1	6	2
5	(Australia) Ken Rosewall	10	6	4	6
(Australia) Bob Carmichael	1	2	4
14	(Spain) Andrés Gimeno	6	6	6
10	(Australia) Roy Emerson	1	7	6	2	9
2	(Australia) John Newcombe	6	5	3	6	11

Semifinals
16	(United Kingdom) Roger Taylor	3	6	3	3
5	(Australia) Ken Rosewall	6	4	6	6
14	(Spain) Andrés Gimeno	3	6	0
2	(Australia) John Newcombe	6	8	6

Final
5	(Australia) Ken Rosewall	7	3	2	6	1
2	(Australia) John Newcombe	5	6	6	3	6

=== Top half ===
==== Section 1 ====
First round
1	(Australia) Rod Laver	6	6	6
(United States) Butch Seewagen	2	0	2
(Austria) Hans Kary	5	6	3	4
(Australia) John Alexander	7	3	6	6
(United States) Herb Fitzgibbon	6	6	7	4
(Australia) Bob Giltinan	8	8	5	6
(South Africa) Frew McMillan	7	6	11
(France) Jean-Loup Rouyer	5	4	9
16	(United Kingdom) Roger Taylor	1	6	8	3	6
(New Zealand) Brian Fairlie	6	3	6	6	4
(Pakistan) Haroon Rahim	w/o
(India) Jaidip Mukerjea
Q	(United Kingdom) John Paish	2	2	6	5
(Czechoslovakia) Milan Holeček	6	6	4	7
(Spain) Antonio Muñoz	4	5	3
(United States) Charlie Pasarell	6	7	6

Second round
1	(Australia) R Laver	6	6	6
(Australia) J Alexander	1	3	3
(Australia) R Giltinan	6	7	4	1	2
(South Africa) F McMillan	3	5	6	6	6
16	(United Kingdom) R Taylor	3	6	6	6
(India) J Mukherjea	6	3	2	4
(Czechoslovakia) M Holeček	1	2	4
(United States) C Pasarell	6	6	6

Third round
1	(Australia) R Laver	6	3	6	6
(South Africa) F McMillan	2	6	0	2
16	(United Kingdom) R Taylor	8	17	6
(United States) C Pasarell	6	15	4

Fourth round
1	(Australia) R Laver	6	4	2	1
16	(United Kingdom) R Taylor	4	6	6	6

==== Section 2 ====
First round
8	(Romania) Ilie Năstase	6	6	7	8
(New Zealand) Onny Parun	8	0	5	6
(Hungary) István Gulyás	2	8	4	4
(United States) Cliff Richey	6	6	6	6
(South Africa) Terry Ryan	9	6	3	6
Q	(Australia) Peter Doerner	7	4	6	3
(Hungary) Szabolcs Baranyi	5	3	2
(Czechoslovakia) Štěpán Koudelka	7	6	6
9	(United States) Clark Graebner	6	6	3	6
(West Germany) Harald Elschenbroich	3	2	6	1
(Soviet Union) Sergei Likhachev	6	2	4
(Romania) Ion Țiriac	8	6	6
(South Africa) Derek Schroder	6	6	6
(Ecuador) Pancho Guzmán	2	2	0
(Argentina) Guillermo Vilas	1	2	4
(India) Premjit Lall	6	6	6

Second round
8	(Romania) I Năstase	7	1	2	6	6
(United States) C Richey	5	6	6	4	3
(South Africa) T Ryan	4	6	6	3	6
(Czechoslovakia) Š Koudelka	6	2	4	6	3
9	(United States) C Graebner	4	14	6	0
(Romania) I Țiriac	6	12	2	0^{r}
(South Africa) D Schroder	4	4	9	2
(India) P Lall	6	6	7	6

Third round
8	(Romania) I Năstase	6	6	6	4	6
(South Africa) T Ryan	3	1	8	6	1
9	(United States) C Graebner	6	6	6
(India) P Lall	0	2	1

Fourth round
8	(Romania) I Năstase	3	0	6	3
9	(United States) C Graebner	6	6	4	6

==== Section 3 ====
First round
4	(Australia) Tony Roche	6	6	6
(South Africa) Bob Maud	1	4	2
Q	(Rhodesia) Roger Dowdeswell	7	1	6	1	5
(Australia) Ray Ruffels	5	6	3	6	7
(Rhodesia) Andrew Pattison	8	6	4	3	6
(United States) Erik van Dillen	6	1	6	6	3
(Rhodesia) Hank Irvine	2	6	3	4
(United Kingdom) Mark Cox	6	4	6	6
13	(Czechoslovakia) Jan Kodeš	2	5	6	6	5
(Soviet Union) Alex Metreveli	6	7	3	2	7
(Czechoslovakia) František Pála	4	4	2
(Brazil) José Edison Mandarino	6	6	6
(United States) Gene Scott	8	6	14
Q	(South Africa) Rauty Krog	6	2	12
(United States) Jim McManus	0	2	2
(United States) Marty Riessen	6	6	6

Second round
4	(Australia) A Roche	6	6	6
(Australia) R Ruffels	4	3	2
(Rhodesia) A Pattison	3	4	7
(United Kingdom) M Cox	6	6	9
(Soviet Union) A Metreveli	7	4	4	4
(Brazil) JE Mandarino	5	6	6	6
(United States) E Scott	4	2	3
(United States) M Riessen	6	6	6

Third round
4	(Australia) A Roche	6	9	6
(United Kingdom) M Cox	2	7	3
(Brazil) JE Mandarino	6	5	5	1
(United States) M Riessen	4	7	7	6

Fourth round
4	(Australia) A Roche	6	8	6	6
(United States) M Riessen	4	10	4	2

==== Section 4 ====
First round
5	(Australia) Ken Rosewall	6	7	6
Q	(Australia) Colin Dibley	3	5	4
(France) Patrick Proisy	8	10	3	4
(France) Jean-Claude Barclay	6	12	6	6
(Chile) Patricio Cornejo	8	4	18	5	6
(Australia) Bill Bowrey	6	6	16	7	8
(Australia) Terry Addison	3	10	12	6
(Australia) Barry Phillips-Moore	6	8	10	3
12	(South Africa) Cliff Drysdale	7	9	8	3	6
(Australia) Fred Stolle	5	11	6	6	3
(Socialist Federal Republic of Yugoslavia) Nikola Špear	6	6	6
(Iran) Taghi Akbari	2	3	3
(United States) Tom Gorman	6	8	7
(France) Jean-Baptiste Chanfreau	2	6	5
Q	(United Kingdom) Peter Curtis	6	6	1	6
(United States) Jim Osborne	3	3	6	4

Second round
5	(Australia) K Rosewall	6	6	6
(France) J-C Barclay	2	1	3
(Australia) W Bowrey	8	1	3	6	3
(Australia) T Addison	6	6	6	4	6
12	(South Africa) C Drysdale	6	6	6
(Socialist Federal Republic of Yugoslavia) N Špear	4	4	4
(United States) T Gorman	6	4	6	6
Q	(United Kingdom) P Curtis	2	6	4	1

Third round
5	(Australia) K Rosewall	6	6	6
(Australia) T Addison	2	4	0
12	(South Africa) C Drysdale	3	3	2
(United States) T Gorman	6	6	6

Fourth round
5	(Australia) K Rosewall	6	6	3	7
(United States) T Gorman	2	2	6	5

=== Bottom half ===
==== Section 5 ====
First round
(United States) Bob Lutz	4	6	6	6
(France) Georges Goven	6	3	3	4
(Belgium) Patrick Hombergen	2	3	2
(Australia) Phil Dent	6	6	6
(South Africa) Bob Hewitt	6	6	6
(France) Daniel Contet	2	3	4
(Denmark) Jørgen Ulrich	9	6	1	3
11	(Netherlands) Tom Okker	11	4	6	6
(Australia) Bob Carmichael	3	10	6	6
(United States) Chauncey Steele	6	8	3	1
(Australia) Dick Crealy	6	6	6
LL	(Ecuador) Eduardo Zuleta	3	2	2
(South Africa) Keith Diepraam	7	13	6
(Jamaica) Richard Russell	5	11	2
(United Kingdom) David Lloyd	2	4	4
6	(Socialist Federal Republic of Yugoslavia) Željko Franulović	6	6	6

Second round
(United States) R Lutz	6	6	6
(Australia) P Dent	2	1	2
(South Africa) R Hewitt	6	6	6
11	(Netherlands) T Okker	3	4	3
(Australia) R Carmichael	4	6	6	3	6
(Australia) R Crealy	6	3	4	6	3
(South Africa) K Diepraam	3	4	6	1
6	(Socialist Federal Republic of Yugoslavia) Z Franulović	6	6	2	6

Third round
(United States) R Lutz	6	7	5	7	3
(South Africa) R Hewitt	1	5	7	9	6
(Australia) R Carmichael	6	6	6
6	(Socialist Federal Republic of Yugoslavia) Z Franulović	3	2	0

Fourth round
(South Africa) R Hewitt	4	7	2
(Australia) R Carmichael	6	9	6

==== Section 6 ====
First round
(Romania) Petre Mărmureanu	2	5	4
(Denmark) Torben Ulrich	6	7	6
(Japan) Koji Watanabe	5	3	6	3
(West Germany) Ingo Buding	7	6	4	6
(United Kingdom) Bobby Wilson	3	4	2
(Australia) Allan Stone	6	6	6
(France) Pierre Barthès	6	1	4	2
14	(Spain) Andrés Gimeno	4	6	6	6
(United Kingdom) Stanley Matthews	4	10	6
(United Arab Republic) Ismail El Shafei	6	12	8
(Switzerland) Dimitri Sturdza	4	4	9	4
(Australia) Lew Hoad	6	6	7	6
(Socialist Federal Republic of Yugoslavia) Nikola Pilić	4	6	6	4	6
(United Kingdom) Gerald Battrick	6	1	1	6	3
(United Kingdom) Graham Stilwell	3	2	1
3	(United States) Arthur Ashe	6	6	6

Second round
(Denmark) T Ulrich	6	6	6
(West Germany) I Buding	2	3	3
(Australia) A Stone	5	6	3	4
14	(Spain) A Gimeno	7	4	6	6
(United Arab Republic) I El Shafei	6	6	4	4	6
(Australia) L Hoad	3	3	6	6	1
(Socialist Federal Republic of Yugoslavia) N Pilić	7	13	4	3
3	(United States) A Ashe	9	11	6	6

Third round
(Denmark) T Ulrich	6	1	2	2
14	(Spain) A Gimeno	4	6	6	6
(United Arab Republic) I El Shafei	3	1	6	0
3	(United States) A Ashe	6	6	2	6

Fourth round
14	(Spain) A Gimeno	7	7	6
3	(United States) A Ashe	5	5	2

==== Section 7 ====
First round
Q	(Australia) John Bartlett	7	2	4	4
(South Africa) Jack Saul	5	6	6	6
(South Africa) Byron Bertram	6	1	6	6
(France) François Jauffret	4	6	3	3
(Soviet Union) Toomas Leius	3	4	9
(Denmark) Jan Leschly	6	6	11
(Soviet Union) Anatoli Volkov	4	2	0
10	(Australia) Roy Emerson	6	6	6
Q	(Australia) Syd Ball	2	2	9	4
(Spain) Manuel Orantes	6	6	7	6
(France) Bernard Montrenaud	2	5	9	6	5
(Czechoslovakia) Jan Kukal	6	7	7	3	7
(West Germany) Hans-Joachim Plötz	6	6	6
Q	(United Kingdom) Stephen Warboys	4	4	4
(Chile) Jaime Fillol	5	6	3	4
7	(United States) Stan Smith	7	2	6	6

Second round
(South Africa) J Saul	3	1	4
(South Africa) B Bertram	6	6	6
(Denmark) J Leschly	3	3	4
10	(Australia) R Emerson	6	6	6
(Spain) M Orantes	3	11	6	6
(Czechoslovakia) J Kukal	6	9	3	4
(West Germany) H-J Plötz	2	2	4
7	(United States) S Smith	6	6	6

Third round
(South Africa) B Bertram	10	0	3	1
10	(Australia) R Emerson	8	6	6	6
(Spain) M Orantes	6	3	6	3
7	(United States) S Smith	4	6	8	6

Fourth round
10	(Australia) R Emerson	2	6	6	6
7	(United States) S Smith	6	3	4	2

==== Section 8 ====
First round
(Australia) Martin Mulligan	5	1	6
(Mexico) Joaquín Loyo Mayo	7	6	8
Q	(Australia) Allan McDonald	7	10	3	4	4
(Soviet Union) Vladimir Korotkov	5	8	6	6	6
(United Kingdom) John Clifton	4	2	3
(Australia) Ian Fletcher	6	6	6
(Italy) Nicola Pietrangeli	w/o
15	(United States) Dennis Ralston
(Italy) Adriano Panatta	1	3	7	6
(Australia) Owen Davidson	6	6	5	8
(South Africa) Ray Moore	9	4	6	1
(United States) Ronnie Holmberg	11	6	2	6
(Australia) Ray Keldie	6	2	3	1
(Greece) Nicholas Kalogeropoulos	4	6	6	6
(United States) Roy Barth	2	3	4
2	(Australia) John Newcombe	6	6	6

Second round
(Mexico) J Loyo Mayo	3	6	6	2	6
(Soviet Union) V Korotkov	6	1	2	6	4
(Australia) I Fletcher	6	3	5	2
15	(United States) D Ralston	4	6	7	6
(Australia) O Davidson	6	6	6
(United States) R Holmberg	4	4	2
(Greece) N Kalogeropoulos	1	2	1
2	(Australia) J Newcombe	6	6	6

Third round
(Mexico) J Loyo Mayo	0	0	1
15	(United States) D Ralston	6	6	6
(Australia) O Davidson	7	3	5
2	(Australia) J Newcombe	9	6	7

Fourth round
15	(United States) D Ralston	12	7	2
2	(Australia) J Newcombe	14	9	6

Preceded by 1970 French Open	Grand Slams; Men's singles	Succeeded by 1970 U.S. Open
