= 1969 Wimbledon Championships – Mixed doubles =

Mixed doubles
- 1969 Wimbledon Championships

Final
- Champions: (Australia) Fred Stolle (United Kingdom) Ann Jones
- Runners-up: (Australia) Tony Roche (Australia) Judy Tegart
- Score: 6–2, 6–3

Details
- Draw: 80 (4Q)
- Seeds: 4

Events
Singles	men	women		boys	girls
Doubles	men	women	mixed	boys	girls
- Wimbledon Championships

Ken Fletcher and Margaret Court were the defending champions, but lost in the semifinals to Fred Stolle and Ann Jones.

Stolle and Jones defeated Tony Roche and Judy Tegart in the final, 6–2, 6–3 to win the mixed doubles tennis title at the 1969 Wimbledon Championships.

== Seeds ==
1. (Australia) Ken Fletcher / (Australia) Margaret Court (semifinals)
2. (Australia) John Newcombe / (United States) Billie Jean King (quarterfinals)
3. (Australia) Tony Roche / (Australia) Judy Tegart (final)
4. (Australia) Fred Stolle / (United Kingdom) Ann Jones (champions)

Click on the seed number of a player to go to their draw section.

== Draw ==
Key

- Q = Qualifier
- WC = Wild card
- LL = Lucky loser
- Alt = Alternate
- ITF = ITF entry
- PR = Protected ranking
- SR = Special ranking
- SE = Special exempt
- JE = Junior exempt
- JR = Junior Accelerator Programme entrant
- CO = College Accelerator Programme entrant
- NG = Next Gen Accelerator Program entrant
- w/o = Walkover
- r = Retired
- d = Defaulted

=== Finals ===
Quarterfinals
1	(Australia) Ken Fletcher (Australia) Margaret Court	6	6
(Japan) Koji Watanabe (Japan) Kazuko Sawamatsu	1	1
4	(Australia) Fred Stolle (United Kingdom) Ann Jones	6	7	6
(United States) Marty Riessen (United States) Rosie Casals	4	9	4
(Australia) Owen Davidson (Netherlands) Betty Stöve	2	1
3	(Australia) Tony Roche (Australia) Judy Tegart	6	6
(Australia) Ray Ruffels (Australia) Karen Krantzcke	7	6	6
2	(Australia) John Newcombe (United States) Billie Jean King	9	3	4

Semifinals
1	(Australia) Ken Fletcher (Australia) Margaret Court	9	9
4	(Australia) Fred Stolle (United Kingdom) Ann Jones	11	11
3	(Australia) Tony Roche (Australia) Judy Tegart	6	7
(Australia) Ray Ruffels (Australia) Karen Krantzcke	4	5

Final
4	(Australia) Fred Stolle (United Kingdom) Ann Jones	6	6
3	(Australia) Tony Roche (Australia) Judy Tegart	2	3

=== Top half ===
==== Section 1 ====
First round

Second round
1	(Australia) K Fletcher (Australia) M Court	6	6
(France) G Goven (Netherlands) J Salomé	2	1
(Republic of Ireland) M Hickey (Australia) L Hunt	4	7	4
(West Germany) H-J Plötz (South Africa) L Rossouw	6	5	6
(South Africa) F McMillan (Rhodesia) P Walkden	6	6
(United Arab Republic) I El Shafei (Sweden) E Lundquist	2	2
(United States) S Smith (United States) C Martinez	2	6	6
(United Kingdom) G Stilwell (United Kingdom) E Truman	6	3	3

Third round
1	(Australia) K Fletcher (Australia) M Court	6	6
(West Germany) H-J Plötz (South Africa) L Rossouw	4	3
(South Africa) F McMillan (Rhodesia) P Walkden	6	6
(United States) S Smith (United States) C Martinez	1	3

Fourth round
1	(Australia) K Fletcher (Australia) M Court	6	6
(South Africa) F McMillan (Rhodesia) P Walkden	3	3

==== Section 2 ====
First round

Second round
(United Kingdom) M Sangster (United Kingdom) J Helliar	4	4
(Japan) K Watanabe (Japan) K Sawamatsu	6	6
(Brazil) T Koch (Brazil) S Petersen	6	4
(Brazil) JE Mandarino (Spain) C Mandarino	8	6
(Soviet Union) S Likhachev (Soviet Union) Z Jansone	6	6
(South Africa) R Moore (South Africa) G Dove	1	2
(United States) R Perry (United States) T Fretz	6	4	5
(South Africa) D Schroder (South Africa) B Kirk	3	6	7

Third round
(Japan) K Watanabe (Japan) K Sawamatsu	7	6
(Brazil) JE Mandarino (Spain) C Mandarino	5	3
(Soviet Union) S Likhachev (Soviet Union) Z Jansone	2	6	7
(South Africa) D Schroder (South Africa) B Kirk	6	2	5

Fourth round
(Japan) K Watanabe (Japan) K Sawamatsu	11	6
(Soviet Union) S Likhachev (Soviet Union) Z Jansone	9	3

==== Section 3 ====
First round

Second round
4	(Australia) F Stolle (United Kingdom) A Jones	6	6
(United States) G Graebner (United States) C Graebner	4	4
(Sweden) O Bengtson (Sweden) C Sandberg	2	6	6
(New Zealand) O Parun (New Zealand) C Fleming	6	1	4
Q	(South Africa) B Bertram (South Africa) A van Deventer	0	5
(Denmark) T Ulrich (United States) J Heldman	6	7
(New Zealand) J McDonald (United States) M Aschner	2	2
(Australia) W Bowrey (Australia) L Bowrey	6	6

Third round
4	(Australia) F Stolle (United Kingdom) A Jones	6	6
(Sweden) O Bengtson (Sweden) C Sandberg	2	4
(Denmark) T Ulrich (United States) J Heldman	3	1
(Australia) W Bowrey (Australia) L Bowrey	6	6

Fourth round
4	(Australia) F Stolle (United Kingdom) A Jones	6	6
(Australia) W Bowrey (Australia) L Bowrey	4	4

==== Section 4 ====
First round
(South Africa) T Ryan (South Africa) W Tomlinson	4	6	1
(Australia) I Fletcher (Australia) W Gilchrist	6	2	6
(United Kingdom) D Lloyd (France) C Spinoza	5	6	3
(United Kingdom) J Barrett (United Kingdom) S Holdsworth	7	4	6
(Australia) R Carmichael (Australia) K Harris	6	3	6
Q	(Sweden) H Nerell (Sweden) M Strandberg	3	6	4
(France) J-C Barclay (France) F Dürr	2	3
(Australia) R Howe (United Kingdom) J Williams	6	6
(Netherlands) T Okker (United Kingdom) V Wade	3	6	2
(United States) M Riessen (United States) R Casals	6	2	6
(United States) R Dell (United States) V Ziegenfuss	6	6
(Greece) N Kalogeropoulos (Greece) C-A Kalogeropoulos	2	2
(South Africa) B Anstey (United Kingdom) S Okin	3	6	6
(South Africa) G Forbes (South Africa) V Forbes	6	3	4
Q	(Austria) P Pokorny (Australia) H Amos
(Australia) G Primrose (United Kingdom) R Lloyd	w/o

Second round
(Australia) I Fletcher (Australia) W Gilchrist	6	2	4
(United Kingdom) J Barrett (United Kingdom) S Holdsworth	4	6	6
(Australia) R Carmichael (Australia) K Harris	6	11
(Australia) R Howe (United Kingdom) J Williams	4	9
(United States) M Riessen (United States) R Casals	6	6
(United States) R Dell (United States) V Ziegenfuss	2	2
(South Africa) B Anstey (United Kingdom) S Okin	4	6	3
(Australia) G Primrose (United Kingdom) R Lloyd	6	3	6

Third round
(United Kingdom) J Barrett (United Kingdom) S Holdsworth	5	6
(Australia) R Carmichael (Australia) K Harris	7	8
(United States) M Riessen (United States) R Casals	6	6
(Australia) G Primrose (United Kingdom) R Lloyd	3	1

Fourth round
(Australia) R Carmichael (Australia) K Harris	3	3
(United States) M Riessen (United States) R Casals	6	6

=== Bottom half ===
==== Section 5 ====
First round
(South Africa) R Krog (South Africa) M Proctor	6	3	2
(United States) T Gorman (United States) P Hogan	3	6	6
(United States) C Richey (United States) N Richey
(United Kingdom) G Battrick (United Kingdom) W Shaw	w/o
(United States) T Karp (United States) BA Grubb	5	3
(Australia) J Moore (Australia) F Moore	7	6
(United States) Bob Lutz (United States) M Michel	w/o
(United States) T Mozur (United States) L Tuero
(United Kingdom) A Mills (United Kingdom) J Mills	6	6
(Australia) J Gardner (Argentina) G Moran	1	3
(Australia) O Davidson (Netherlands) B Stöve	6	6
(United Kingdom) M Cox (United Kingdom) A Cox	2	3
(Chile) J Pinto Bravo (Argentina) AM Arias	6	3	1
(United Kingdom) R Taylor (United Kingdom) F Taylor	3	6	6
(Czechoslovakia) V Zedník (Netherlands) A Bakker	2	4
(Australia) R Keldie (Canada) F Urban	6	6

Second round
(United States) T Gorman (United States) P Hogan	7	4	5
(United Kingdom) G Battrick (United Kingdom) W Shaw	5	6	7
(Australia) J Moore (Australia) F Moore	w/o
(United States) Bob Lutz (United States) M Michel
(United Kingdom) A Mills (United Kingdom) J Mills	2	1
(Australia) O Davidson (Netherlands) B Stöve	6	6
(United Kingdom) R Taylor (United Kingdom) F Taylor	6	6
(Australia) R Keldie (Canada) F Urban	4	3

Third round
(United Kingdom) G Battrick (United Kingdom) W Shaw	6	6
(Australia) J Moore (Australia) F Moore	2	4
(Australia) O Davidson (Netherlands) B Stöve	6	2	6
(United Kingdom) R Taylor (United Kingdom) F Taylor	3	6	2

Fourth round
(United Kingdom) G Battrick (United Kingdom) W Shaw	5	3
(Australia) O Davidson (Netherlands) B Stöve	7	6

==== Section 6 ====
First round

Second round
(United States) A Neely (United States) J Anthony	7	4
(Soviet Union) A Metreveli (Soviet Union) O Morozova	9	6
(Socialist Federal Republic of Yugoslavia) N Pilić (Australia) K Melville	6	6
(United Kingdom) H Truman (United Kingdom) C Janes	3	4
(United Kingdom) K Wooldridge (Finland) B Lindström	4	7
(New Zealand) B Fairlie (United States) K Pigeon	6	9
(Australia) P Dent (United Kingdom) J Townsend	4	1
3	(Australia) A Roche (Australia) J Tegart	6	6

Third round
(Soviet Union) A Metreveli (Soviet Union) O Morozova	2	4
(Socialist Federal Republic of Yugoslavia) N Pilić (Australia) K Melville	6	6
(New Zealand) B Fairlie (United States) K Pigeon	1	2
3	(Australia) A Roche (Australia) J Tegart	6	6

Fourth round
(Socialist Federal Republic of Yugoslavia) N Pilić (Australia) K Melville	11	2
3	(Australia) A Roche (Australia) J Tegart	13	6

==== Section 7 ====
First round

Second round
Q	(United Kingdom) S Matthews (United Kingdom) E Ernest	0	2
(Australia) A Stone (Australia) H Gourlay	6	6
(United Kingdom) J Clifton (United Kingdom) A Soady	w/o
(Colombia) W Álvarez (France) É Terras
(Soviet Union) V Korotkov (Soviet Union) M Chuvirina	6	6
(United States) D Dell (United States) J Bartkowicz	1	2
(South Africa) R Maud (South Africa) E Emmanuel	4	5
(Australia) R Ruffels (Australia) K Krantzcke	6	7

Third round
(Australia) A Stone (Australia) H Gourlay	6	3	6
(United Kingdom) J Clifton (United Kingdom) A Soady	3	6	3
(Soviet Union) V Korotkov (Soviet Union) M Chuvirina	4	3
(Australia) R Ruffels (Australia) K Krantzcke	6	6

Fourth round
(Australia) A Stone (Australia) H Gourlay	1	5
(Australia) R Ruffels (Australia) K Krantzcke	6	7

==== Section 8 ====
First round

Second round
(United Kingdom) C McHugo (United Kingdom) W Hall	w/o
(Chile) P Rodríguez (Australia) C Sherriff
(France) J-B Chanfreau (France) G Chanfreau	6	6
(United Kingdom) P Hutchins (United Kingdom) S Brasher	3	3
(Australia) B Geraghty (United States) D Carter	2	5
(Australia) A McDonald (Australia) J Young	6	7
(United Kingdom) P Curtis (United States) M-A Curtis	3	1
2	(Australia) J Newcombe (United States) BJ King	6	6

Third round
(United Kingdom) C McHugo (United Kingdom) W Hall	2	6	7
(France) J-B Chanfreau (France) G Chanfreau	6	2	5
(Australia) A McDonald (Australia) J Young	2	1
2	(Australia) J Newcombe (United States) BJ King	6	6

Fourth round
(United Kingdom) C McHugo (United Kingdom) W Hall	2	2
2	(Australia) J Newcombe (United States) BJ King	6	6
