= 1969 Wimbledon Championships – Men's doubles =

Men's doubles
- 1969 Wimbledon Championships

Final
- Champions: (Australia) John Newcombe (Australia) Tony Roche
- Runners-up: (Netherlands) Tom Okker (United States) Marty Riessen
- Score: 7–5, 11-9, 6–3

Details
- Draw: 64 (4 Q )
- Seeds: 8

Events
Singles	men	women		boys	girls
Doubles	men	women	mixed	boys	girls
← 1968 ·	Wimbledon Championships	· 1970 →

John Newcombe and Tony Roche successfully defended their title, defeating Tom Okker and Marty Riessen in the final, 7–5, 11–9, 6–3 to win the gentlemen's doubles title at the 1969 Wimbledon Championships.

== Seeds ==
1. (Australia) John Newcombe / (Australia) Tony Roche (champions)
2. (Australia) Roy Emerson / (Australia) Rod Laver (semifinals)
3. (Australia) Ken Rosewall / (Australia) Fred Stolle (third round)
4. (United States) Bob Lutz / (United States) Stan Smith (quarterfinals)
5. (South Africa) Bob Hewitt / (South Africa) Frew McMillan (semifinals)
6. (Netherlands) Tom Okker / (United States) Marty Riessen (final)
7. (South Africa) Cliff Drysdale / (United Kingdom) Roger Taylor (quarterfinals)
8. (United States) Arthur Ashe / (United States) Charlie Pasarell (third round)

Click on the seed number of a player to go to their draw section.

== Draw ==
=== Key ===
- Q = Qualifier
- WC = Wild card
- LL = Lucky loser
- Alt = Alternate
- ITF = ITF entry
- PR = Protected ranking
- SR = Special ranking
- SE = Special exempt
- JE = Junior exempt
- JR = Junior Accelerator Programme entrant
- CO = College Accelerator Programme entrant
- NG = Next Gen Accelerator Program entrant
- w/o = Walkover
- r = Retired
- d = Defaulted

=== Finals ===
Quarterfinals
1	(Australia) John Newcombe (Australia) Tony Roche	6	6	6
(France) Daniel Contet (France) François Jauffret	1	4	2
4	(United States) Bob Lutz (United States) Stan Smith	3	6	2	6	18
5	(South Africa) Bob Hewitt (South Africa) Frew McMillan	6	3	6	3	20
6	(Netherlands) Tom Okker (United States) Marty Riessen	7	6	6
(Australia) Dick Crealy (Australia) Allan Stone	5	4	4
7	(South Africa) Cliff Drysdale (United Kingdom) Roger Taylor	6	4	2
2	(Australia) Roy Emerson (Australia) Rod Laver	8	6	6

Semifinals
1	(Australia) John Newcombe (Australia) Tony Roche	3	6	14	6
5	(South Africa) Bob Hewitt (South Africa) Frew McMillan	6	3	12	2
6	(Netherlands) Tom Okker (United States) Marty Riessen	6	3	6	6
2	(Australia) Roy Emerson (Australia) Rod Laver	3	6	3	4

Final
1	(Australia) John Newcombe (Australia) Tony Roche	7	11	6
6	(Netherlands) Tom Okker (United States) Marty Riessen	5	9	3

=== Top half ===
==== Section 1 ====
First round
1	(Australia) J Newcombe (Australia) A Roche	9	11	6
(United Kingdom) M Cox (United Kingdom) P Curtis	7	9	2
(United States) T Edlefsen (Belgium) P Hombergen	w/o
(United Kingdom) R Becker (United Kingdom) A Mills
(Greece) N Kalogeropoulos (United States) G Mulloy	3	6	4
(Japan) J Kawamori (Japan) K Watanabe	6	8	6
Q	(Australia) J Brown (Australia) I Fletcher	4	6	6	8	1
(Spain) M Orantes (United States) V Seixas	6	3	2	10	6
8	(United States) A Ashe (United States) C Pasarell	6	8	7
(United States) T Gorman (United States) A Neely	4	6	5
(Chile) J Pinto Bravo (Chile) P Rodríguez	3	4	3
(Brazil) T Koch (Brazil) JE Mandarino	6	6	6
(France) D Contet (France) F Jauffret	6	6	9
(Soviet Union) S Likhachev (Soviet Union) A Metreveli	3	4	7
(Australia) J Alexander (Australia) P Dent	6	3	6	6
Q	(United Kingdom) S Matthews (United Kingdom) J Paish	3	6	3	3

Second round
1	(Australia) J Newcombe (Australia) A Roche	6	10	6
(United Kingdom) R Becker (United Kingdom) A Mills	2	8	2
(Japan) J Kawamori (Japan) K Watanabe	4	3	5
(Spain) M Orantes (United States) V Seixas	6	6	7
8	(United States) A Ashe (United States) C Pasarell	1	2	8	7	6
(Brazil) T Koch (Brazil) JE Mandarino	6	6	6	5	2
(France) D Contet (France) F Jauffret	9	25	7
(Australia) J Alexander (Australia) P Dent	7	23	5

Third round
1	(Australia) J Newcombe (Australia) A Roche	6	6	6
(Spain) M Orantes (United States) V Seixas	3	4	2
8	(United States) A Ashe (United States) C Pasarell	6	4	2	6	4
(France) D Contet (France) F Jauffret	4	6	6	3	6

Quarterfinals
1	(Australia) J Newcombe (Australia) A Roche	6	6	6
(France) D Contet (France) F Jauffret	1	4	2

==== Section 2 ====
First round
4	(United States) R Lutz (United States) S Smith	16	16	6	6
(Australia) T Addison (Australia) R Keldie	14	8	3	4
(Chile) L Ayala (Socialist Federal Republic of Yugoslavia) Ž Franulović	w/o
(Poland) T Nowicki (Poland) M Rybarczyk
(New Zealand) B Fairlie (New Zealand) O Parun	6	6	6
(Australia) S Ball (Australia) R Giltinan	2	4	2
(Australia) J Cooper (Australia) B Phillips-Moore	6	6	6
(United Kingdom) G Battrick (United Kingdom) P Hutchins	4	2	4
5	(South Africa) R Hewitt (South Africa) F McMillan	6	6	7
Q	(United States) T Mozur (United States) C Steele	2	4	5
(France) P Beust (France) J-B Chanfreau	6	4	4
(Australia) O Davidson (United States) D Ralston	8	6	6
(Czechoslovakia) J Kodeš (Czechoslovakia) J Kukal	4	5	20	6	9
(France) P Darmon (France) J-L Rouyer	6	7	18	4	7
(India) P Lall (India) J Mukerjea	4	4	4
(United States) G Graebner (United States) E Scott	6	6	6

Second round
4	(United States) R Lutz (United States) S Smith	6	9	6
(Poland) T Nowicki (Poland) M Rybarczyk	1	7	4
(New Zealand) B Fairlie (New Zealand) O Parun	3	6	7	6
(Australia) J Cooper (Australia) B Phillips-Moore	6	4	5	1
5	(South Africa) R Hewitt (South Africa) F McMillan	6	4	9	6
(Australia) O Davidson (United States) D Ralston	2	6	7	4
(Czechoslovakia) J Kodeš (Czechoslovakia) J Kukal	9	2	6	5
(United States) G Graebner (United States) E Scott	11	6	4	7

Third round
4	(United States) R Lutz (United States) S Smith	8	11	3	20
(New Zealand) B Fairlie (New Zealand) O Parun	6	9	6	18
5	(South Africa) R Hewitt (South Africa) F McMillan	4	6	6	6
(United States) C Graebner (United States) E Scott	6	3	1	1

Quarterfinals
4	(United States) R Lutz (United States) S Smith	3	6	2	6	18
5	(South Africa) R Hewitt (South Africa) F McMillan	6	3	6	3	20

=== Bottom half ===
==== Section 3 ====
First round
(Australia) W Bowrey (Australia) R Ruffels	4	8	6	6
(Australia) R Carmichael (United Arab Republic) I El Shafei	6	6	3	4
(France) P Barthès (Socialist Federal Republic of Yugoslavia) N Pilić	9	6	6
(United States) D Dell (United States) R Dell	7	3	2
(Denmark) J Leschly (Denmark) J Ulrich	3	12	13	6
(Sweden) O Bengtson (Sweden) M Carlstein	6	10	11	1
(Chile) P Cornejo (Chile) J Fillol	2	7	0
6	(Netherlands) T Okker (United States) M Riessen	6	9	6
(France) G Goven (France) W N'Godrella	6	6	6
Q	(Jamaica) L Lumsden (Jamaica) R Russell	2	4	2
(Australia) R Crealy (Australia) A Stone	18	9	6
(Czechoslovakia) M Holeček (Czechoslovakia) V Zedník	16	7	4
(France) J-P Courcol (France) B Paul	10	1	3	3
(United States) R Barth (United States) A Olmedo	8	6	6	6
(Australia) R Howe (South Africa) A Segal	3	5	0
3	(Australia) K Rosewall (Australia) F Stolle	6	7	6

Second round
(Australia) W Bowrey (Australia) R Ruffels	4	7	6	6
(France) P Barthès (Socialist Federal Republic of Yugoslavia) N Pilić	6	5	3	4
(Denmark) J Leschly (Denmark) J Ulrich	6	6	3	4	4
6	(Netherlands) T Okker (United States) M Riessen	1	4	6	6	6
(France) G Goven (France) W N'Godrella	3	2	7
(Australia) R Crealy (Australia) A Stone	6	6	9
(United States) R Barth (United States) A Olmedo	4	3	2
3	(Australia) K Rosewall (Australia) F Stolle	6	6	6

Third round
(Australia) W Bowrey (Australia) R Ruffels	6	3	2
6	(Netherlands) T Okker (United States) M Riessen	8	6	6
(Australia) R Crealy (Australia) A Stone	12	6	6
3	(Australia) K Rosewall (Australia) F Stolle	10	1	4

Quarterfinals
6	(Netherlands) T Okker (United States) M Riessen	7	6	6
(Australia) R Crealy (Australia) A Stone	5	4	4

==== Section 4 ====
First round
(United Kingdom) J Clifton (United Kingdom) D Lloyd	0	7	8	7	10
(West Germany) I Buding (United Kingdom) M Sangster	6	9	6	5	8
(France) J-C Barclay (United Kingdom) R Wilson	6	3	6	6
(Soviet Union) V Korotkov (Soviet Union) T Leius	1	6	4	3
(West Germany) H-J Plötz (West Germany) H-J Pohmann	8	3	2
(South Africa) R Maud (United States) C Richey	10	6	6
(South Africa) R Krog (South Africa) T Ryan	3	1	4
7	(South Africa) C Drysdale (United Kingdom) R Taylor	6	6	6
(United States) E Buchholz (South Africa) R Moore	6	6	5	4	6
(Australia) M Anderson (United States) R Holmberg	3	0	7	6	4
(Australia) K Fletcher (Spain) A Gimeno	2	6	7	6
(United States) R Gonzales (United States) J McManus	6	3	5	4
(Romania) I Năstase (Romania) I Țiriac	w/o
(United Kingdom) G Stilwell (United Kingdom) K Wooldridge
(Australia) M Mulligan (Italy) N Pietrangeli	w/o
2	(Australia) R Emerson (Australia) R Laver

Second round
(United Kingdom) J Clifton (United Kingdom) D Lloyd	3	2	3
(France) J-C Barclay (United Kingdom) R Wilson	6	6	6
(South Africa) R Maud (United States) C Richey	8	6	0	6	13
7	(South Africa) C Drysdale (United Kingdom) R Taylor	10	4	6	4	15
(United States) E Buchholz (South Africa) R Moore
(Australia) K Fletcher (Spain) A Gimeno	w/o
(United Kingdom) G Stilwell (United Kingdom) K Wooldridge	1	0	2
2	(Australia) R Emerson (United Kingdom) R Laver	6	6	6

Third round
(France) J-C Barclay (United Kingdom) R Wilson	12	2	3
7	(South Africa) C Drysdale (United Kingdom) R Taylor	14	6	6
(United States) E Buchholz (South Africa) R Moore	4	2	2
2	' (Australia) R Emerson (Australia) R Laver	6	6	6

Quarterfinals
7	(South Africa) C Drysdale (United Kingdom) R Taylor	6	4	2
2	(Australia) R Emerson (Australia) R Laver	8	6	6
