= 1970 Wimbledon Championships – Men's doubles =

Men's doubles
- 1970 Wimbledon Championships

Final
- Champions: (Australia) John Newcombe (Australia) Tony Roche
- Runners-up: (Australia) Ken Rosewall (Australia) Fred Stolle
- Score: 10–8, 6–3, 6–1

Details
- Draw: 64 (4Q)
- Seeds: 8

Events
Singles	men	women		boys	girls
Doubles	men	women	mixed	boys	girls
- Wimbledon Championships

John Newcombe and Tony Roche successfully defended their title, defeating Ken Rosewall and Fred Stolle in the final, 10–8, 6–3, 6–1 to win the gentlemen's doubles title at the 1970 Wimbledon Championships.

== Seeds ==
1. (Australia) John Newcombe / (Australia) Tony Roche (champions)
2. (Netherlands) Tom Okker / (United States) Marty Riessen (quarterfinals)
3. (Australia) Roy Emerson / (Australia) Rod Laver (quarterfinals)
4. (South Africa) Bob Hewitt / (South Africa) Frew McMillan (semifinals)
5. (United States) Bob Lutz / (United States) Stan Smith (third round)
6. (Australia) Ken Rosewall / (Australia) Fred Stolle (final)
7. (South Africa) Cliff Drysdale / (United Kingdom) Roger Taylor (third round)
8. (Australia) Bill Bowrey / (Australia) Owen Davidson (third round)

Click on the seed number of a player to go to their draw section.

== Draw ==
Key

- Q = Qualifier
- WC = Wild card
- LL = Lucky loser
- Alt = Alternate
- ITF = ITF entry
- PR = Protected ranking
- SR = Special ranking
- SE = Special exempt
- JE = Junior exempt
- JR = Junior Accelerator Programme entrant
- CO = College Accelerator Programme entrant
- NG = Next Gen Accelerator Program entrant
- w/o = Walkover
- r = Retired
- d = Defaulted

=== Finals ===
Quarterfinals
1	(Australia) John Newcombe (Australia) Tony Roche	6	6	6
(Australia) Terry Addison (Australia) Bob Carmichael	4	4	4
4	(South Africa) Bob Hewitt (South Africa) Frew McMillan	6	4	6	4	10
(United Kingdom) Mark Cox (United Kingdom) Graham Stilwell	3	6	4	6	8
6	(Australia) Ken Rosewall (Australia) Fred Stolle	6	6	13
3	(Australia) Roy Emerson (Australia) Rod Laver	4	4	11
(Romania) Ilie Năstase (Romania) Ion Țiriac	6	6	10
2	(Netherlands) Tom Okker (United States) Marty Riessen	4	4	8

Semifinals
1	(Australia) John Newcombe (Australia) Tony Roche	7	8	5	5	6
4	(South Africa) Bob Hewitt (South Africa) Frew McMillan	5	6	7	7	4
6	(Australia) Ken Rosewall (Australia) Fred Stolle	6	3	10	0	6
(Romania) Ilie Năstase (Romania) Ion Țiriac	4	6	8	6	3

Final
1	(Australia) John Newcombe (Australia) Tony Roche	10	6	6
6	(Australia) Ken Rosewall (Australia) Fred Stolle	8	3	1

=== Top half ===
==== Section 1 ====
First round
1	(Australia) J Newcombe (Australia) A Roche	13	5	8	8
(United Kingdom) G Battrick (United Kingdom) P Curtis	11	7	6	6
(Soviet Union) S Likhachev (Soviet Union) A Metreveli	8	8	6
Q	(Australia) R Case (Australia) A Gardiner	6	6	4
(Australia) J Bartlett (Australia) G Masters	6	3	7	4	2
(Jamaica) L Lumsden (Jamaica) R Russell	4	6	5	6	6
(New Zealand) B Fairlie (New Zealand) O Parun	6	6	6
Q	(South Africa) M Baleson (Rhodesia) A Fawcett	3	4	2
8	(Australia) W Bowrey (Australia) O Davidson	6	6	3	6
(Australia) R Crealy (Australia) A Stone	4	4	6	3
(Colombia) W Álvarez (Brazil) JE Mandarino	6	6	6	2	9
(United Arab Republic) I El Shafei (Denmark) T Ulrich	2	8	4	6	7
(South Africa) R Maud (United Kingdom) R Wilson	2	4	4
(Australia) T Addison (Australia) R Carmichael	6	6	6
(Australia) L Hoad (South Africa) A Segal	2	6	6	6
(United States) D Dell (Australia) R Howe	6	4	2	1

Second round
1	(Australia) J Newcombe (Australia) A Roche	6	6	7
(Soviet Union) S Likhachev (Soviet Union) A Metreveli	4	4	5
(Jamaica) L Lumsden (Jamaica) R Russell	9	4	6	3
(New Zealand) B Fairlie (New Zealand) O Parun	11	6	4	6
8	(Australia) W Bowrey (Australia) O Davidson	6	6	6
(Colombia) W Álvarez (Brazil) JE Mandarino	1	0	3
(Australia) T Addison (Australia) R Carmichael	4	9	1	6	6
(Australia) L Hoad (South Africa) A Segal	6	7	6	4	2

Third round
1	(Australia) J Newcombe (Australia) A Roche	6	6	6
(New Zealand) B Fairlie (New Zealand) O Parun	2	2	2
8	(Australia) W Bowrey (Australia) O Davidson	5	3	3
(Australia) T Addison (Australia) R Carmichael	7	6	6

Quarterfinals
1	(Australia) J Newcombe (Australia) A Roche	6	6	6
(Australia) T Addison (Australia) R Carmichael	4	4	4

==== Section 2 ====
First round
4	(South Africa) R Hewitt (South Africa) F McMillan	6	6	6
(United Kingdom) P Hutchins (United Kingdom) S Matthews	3	2	4
(France) B Montrenaud (France) P Proisy	w/o
(Spain) A Muñoz (Spain) M Orantes
(Soviet Union) V Korotkov (Soviet Union) A Volkov	6	6	3	9
(South Africa) G Forbes (United Kingdom) A Mills	3	4	6	7
(Rhodesia) A Pattison (South Africa) T Ryan	13	6	3
(Australia) J Alexander (Australia) P Dent	15	6	6
5	(United States) R Lutz (United States) S Smith	8	6	14
(United Kingdom) J Clifton (United Kingdom) D Lloyd	6	2	12
(France) J-B Chanfreau (France) J-L Rouyer	3	4	4
(Greece) N Kalogeropoulos (Australia) R Keldie	6	6	6
(Chile) P Cornejo (Chile) J Fillol	3	7	2	6	7
(Socialist Federal Republic of Yugoslavia) Ž Franulović (Mexico) J Loyo Mayo	6	5	6	3	5
(United Kingdom) M Cox (United Kingdom) G Stilwell	8	6	6
(India) P Lall (India) J Mukerjea	6	1	2

Second round
4	(South Africa) R Hewitt (South Africa) F McMillan	6	6	6
(Spain) A Muñoz (Spain) M Orantes	1	3	4
(Soviet Union) V Korotkov (Soviet Union) A Volkov	6	7	1	4
(Australia) J Alexander (Australia) P Dent	4	9	6	6
5	(United States) R Lutz (United States) S Smith	6	4	13	6
(Greece) N Kalogeropoulos (Australia) R Keldie	3	6	11	4
(Chile) P Cornejo (Chile) J Fillol	4	7	4
(United Kingdom) M Cox (United Kingdom) G Stilwell	6	9	6

Third round
4	(South Africa) R Hewitt (South Africa) F McMillan	6	7	6
(Australia) J Alexander (Australia) P Dent	2	5	3
5	(United States) R Lutz (United States) S Smith	11	3	4	14
(United Kingdom) M Cox (United Kingdom) G Stilwell	9	6	6	16

Quarterfinals
4	(South Africa) R Hewitt (South Africa) F McMillan	6	4	6	4	10
(United Kingdom) M Cox (United Kingdom) G Stilwell	3	6	4	6	8

=== Bottom half ===
==== Section 3 ====
First round
(West Germany) I Buding (West Germany) H-J Plötz
(France) G Goven (France) F Jauffret	w/o
(France) P Barthès (Socialist Federal Republic of Yugoslavia) N Pilić	9	7	6	6
(Australia) S Ball (Australia) R Giltinan	11	5	3	4
(United Kingdom) J Barrett (United Kingdom) K Wooldridge	3	3	8
Q	(Soviet Union) T Leius (Soviet Union) V Palman	6	6	10
(United States) C Richey (Australia) R Ruffels	3	2	6	1
6	(Australia) K Rosewall (Australia) F Stolle	6	6	4	6
(Italy) M di Domenico (Italy) E di Matteo	3	6	6	6	6
(Belgium) E Drossart (Belgium) P Hombergen	6	2	8	2	3
(United States) A Ashe (United States) D Ralston	1	6	3	6	6
(France) J-C Barclay (France) D Contet	6	4	6	3	3
(Chile) J Pinto Bravo (Chile) P Rodríguez	6	6	6	8	6
(Australia) A Hammond (Australia) A McDonald	8	4	4	10	4
(Austria) H Kary (Austria) P Pokorny	4	3	3
3	(Australia) R Emerson (Australia) R Laver	6	6	6

Second round
(West Germany) I Buding (West Germany) H-J Plötz	8	3	10	3
(France) P Barthès (Socialist Federal Republic of Yugoslavia) N Pilić	6	6	12	6
Q	(Soviet Union) T Leius (Soviet Union) V Palman	4	4	1
6	(Australia) K Rosewall (Australia) F Stolle	6	6	6
(Italy) M di Domenico (Italy) E di Matteo	4	1	4
(United States) A Ashe (United States) D Ralston	6	6	6
(Chile) J Pinto Bravo (Chile) P Rodríguez	7	13	3
3	(Australia) R Emerson (Australia) R Laver	9	15	6

Third round
(France) P Barthès (Socialist Federal Republic of Yugoslavia) N Pilić	6	5	6	1	4
6	(Australia) K Rosewall (Australia) F Stolle	3	7	4	6	6
(United States) A Ashe (United States) D Ralston	5	3	10
3	(Australia) R Emerson (Australia) R Laver	7	6	12

Quarterfinals
6	(Australia) K Rosewall (Australia) F Stolle	6	6	13
3	(Australia) R Emerson (Australia) R Laver	4	4	11

==== Section 4 ====
First round
(Romania) I Năstase (Romania) I Țiriac	6	6	6
(South Africa) K Diepraam (South Africa) R Krog	4	2	3
(United States) G Seewagen (United States) C Steele	4	6	12	6	6
(Australia) C Dibley (Australia) P Doerner	6	8	10	3	4
(Denmark) J Leschly (Denmark) J Ulrich	2	6	6	5	10
(United States) R Holmberg (South Africa) R Moore	6	4	4	7	8
(Czechoslovakia) J Kodeš (Czechoslovakia) J Kukal	3	3	7
7	(South Africa) C Drysdale (United Kingdom) R Taylor	6	6	9
(United States) C Pasarell (United States) E van Dillen	6	7	7
(United States) R Barth (United States) T Gorman	4	5	5
(United States) J McManus (United States) J Osborne	5	6	7	7	11
Q	(Rhodesia) R Dowdeswell (Rhodesia) H Irvine	7	4	9	5	9
(United States) C Graebner (United States) E Scott	6	10	6	6
(Poland) T Nowicki (Poland) M Rybarczyk	3	12	3	3
(Japan) J Kuki (Japan) K Watanabe	3	0	3
2	(Netherlands) T Okker (United States) M Riessen	6	6	6

Second round
(Romania) I Năstase (Romania) I Țiriac	6	6	3	9
(United States) G Seewagen (United States) C Steele	3	4	6	7
(Denmark) J Leschly (Denmark) J Ulrich	7	13	3
7	(South Africa) C Drysdale (United Kingdom) R Taylor	9	15	6
(United States) C Pasarell (United States) E van Dillen	11	9	6
(United States) J McManus (United States) J Osborne	9	7	1
(United States) C Graebner (United States) E Scott	6	4	6	2	2
2	(Netherlands) T Okker (United States) M Riessen	2	6	4	6	6

Third round
(Romania) I Năstase (Romania) I Țiriac	6	6	6
7	(South Africa) C Drysdale (United Kingdom) R Taylor	4	3	3
(United States) C Pasarell (United States) E van Dillen	3	2	8	4
2	(Netherlands) T Okker (United States) M Riessen	6	6	6	6

Quarterfinals
(Romania) I Năstase (Romania) I Țiriac	6	6	10
2	(Netherlands) T Okker (United States) M Riessen	4	4	8
