= 1970 Wimbledon Championships – Boys' singles =

Boys' singles
- 1970 Wimbledon Championships

Final
- Champion: (South Africa) Byron Bertram
- Runner-up: (West Germany) Frank Gebert
- Score: 6–0, 6–3

Events
Singles	men	women		boys	girls
Doubles	men	women	mixed	boys	girls
← 1969 ·	Wimbledon Championships	· 1971 →

Byron Bertram successfully defended his title, defeating Frank Gebert in the final, 6–0, 6–3 to win the boys' singles tennis title at the 1970 Wimbledon Championships.

== Draw ==
=== Key ===
- Q = Qualifier
- WC = Wild card
- LL = Lucky loser
- Alt = Alternate
- SE = Special exempt
- PR = Protected ranking
- ITF = ITF entry
- JE = Junior exempt
- w/o = Walkover
- r = Retired
- d = Defaulted
- SR = Special ranking

=== Finals ===
Semifinals
(United Kingdom) Stephen Warboys	3	3
(West Germany) Frank Gebert	6	6
(South Africa) Byron Bertram	6	6
(Australia) Kim Warwick	4	2

Final
(West Germany) Frank Gebert	0	3
(South Africa) Byron Bertram	6	6

=== Top half ===
First round
(Switzerland) P Ormen	6	2	3
(Denmark) C Larsen	4	6	6
(Pakistan) A Farooq	0	2
(United Kingdom) Stephen Warboys	6	6
(Sweden) Rolf Norberg	6	3	5
(Czechoslovakia) Radovan Cižek	4	6	7
(West Germany) Frank Gebert	6	6
(Republic of Ireland) W Campbell	0	3
(Portugal) L Hegren	w/o
(Belgium) D Frere
(Finland) Matti Timonen	2	4
(Spain) Juan Herrera	6	6
(United Arab Emirates) AA Ibrahim	1	3
(Austria) Gerhard Wimmer	6	6

Second round
(Sudan) Samir Farid	1	6	4
(Denmark) C Larsen	6	3	6
(United Kingdom) S Warboys	6	6
(Czechoslovakia) R Cižek	1	3
(West Germany) F Gebert	6	6
(Belgium) D Frere	1	2
(Spain) J Herrera	6	7
(Austria) G Wimmer	0	5

Quarterfinals
(Denmark) C Larsen	1	3
(United Kingdom) S Warboys	6	6
(West Germany) F Gebert	6	3	6
(Spain) J Herrera	4	6	3

Semifinals
(United Kingdom) S Warboys	3	3
(West Germany) F Gebert	6	6

=== Bottom half ===
First round
(France) Jean-François Caujolle	1	0
(South Africa) Byron Bertram	6	6
(Netherlands) A Constandse	6	6
(Socialist Federal Republic of Yugoslavia) Dragan Stojović	4	0
(Norway) E Eckhoff	2	0
(Argentina) Guillermo Vilas	6	6
(India) Sashi Menon	6	6
(Monaco) E Vanderpol	1	4
(Indonesia) Atet Wijono	2	3
(Australia) Kim Warwick	6	6
(Hungary) Balázs Taróczy
(Brazil) O Diva	w/o
(Soviet Union) A Rudj	1	1
(Poland) Wojciech Fibak	6	6

Second round
(South Africa) B Bertram	6	6
(Netherlands) A Constandse	1	2
(Argentina) G Vilas	6	9	7
(India) S Menon	1	11	5
(Australia) K Warwick	6	8
(Hungary) B Taróczy	3	6
(Poland) W Fibak	7	8
(Jamaica) Compton Russell	5	6

Quarterfinals
(South Africa) B Bertram	8	6
(Argentina) G Vilas	6	3
(Australia) K Warwick	6	6
(Poland) W Fibak	3	4

Semifinals
(South Africa) B Bertram	6	6
(Australia) K Warwick	4	2
