= Joan Koudelka =

South African tennis player (born 1948)

- Full name: Joan Mary Koudelka
- Country (sports): South Africa
- Born: 14 March 1948 (age 77)

Singles

Grand Slam singles results
- French Open: 1R (1971)
- Wimbledon: 2R (1969)

Doubles

Grand Slam doubles results
- Wimbledon: 1R (1969)

Grand Slam mixed doubles results
- Wimbledon: 2R (1970)

Joan Mary Koudelka (born 14 March 1948) is a South African former professional tennis player. She originally competed under her maiden name Joan Wilshere, before marrying Czech tennis player Štěpán Koudelka.

Koudelka had a win over her countrywoman Brenda Kirk to make the second round of the 1969 Wimbledon Championships. She qualified for her only French Open main draw in 1971 and was beaten in the first round by Evonne Goolagong, who went on to win the title.
