= 1969 Wimbledon Championships – Men's singles =

Men's singles
- 1969 Wimbledon Championships

Final
- Champion: (Australia) Rod Laver
- Runner-up: (Australia) John Newcombe
- Score: 6–4, 5–7, 6–4, 6–4

Details
- Draw: 128 (10Q)
- Seeds: 16

Events
Singles	men	women		boys	girls
Doubles	men	women	mixed	boys	girls
- Wimbledon Championships

Defending champion Rod Laver defeated John Newcombe in the final, 6–4, 5–7, 6–4, 6–4 to win the gentlemen's singles tennis title at the 1969 Wimbledon Championships. It was his fourth Wimbledon singles title and tenth Grand Slam tournament singles title overall. It was the third leg of an eventual second Grand Slam for Laver, which remains the only Grand Slam achieved in men's singles tennis in the Open Era.

== Seeds ==
1. (Australia) Rod Laver (champion)
2. (Australia) Tony Roche (semifinals)
3. (Netherlands) Tom Okker (quarterfinals)
4. (Australia) Ken Rosewall (third round)
5. (United States) Arthur Ashe (semifinals)
6. (Australia) John Newcombe (final)
7. (United States) Clark Graebner (quarterfinals)
8. (South Africa) Cliff Drysdale (quarterfinals)
9. (Australia) Roy Emerson (fourth round)
10. (Spain) Andrés Gimeno (fourth round)
11. (Australia) Fred Stolle (fourth round)
12. (United States) Pancho Gonzales (fourth round)
13. (South Africa) Raymond Moore (first round)
14. (South Africa) Bob Hewitt (first round)
15. (United States) Dennis Ralston (fourth round)
16. (United States) Stan Smith (fourth round)

Click on the seed number of a player to go to their draw section.

== Draw ==
Key

- Q = Qualifier
- WC = Wild card
- LL = Lucky loser
- Alt = Alternate
- ITF = ITF entry
- PR = Protected ranking
- SR = Special ranking
- SE = Special exempt
- JE = Junior exempt
- JR = Junior Accelerator Programme entrant
- CO = College Accelerator Programme entrant
- NG = Next Gen Accelerator Program entrant
- w/o = Walkover
- r = Retired
- d = Defaulted

=== Finals ===
Quarterfinals
1	(Australia) Rod Laver	6	6	6
8	(South Africa) Cliff Drysdale	4	2	3
(United States) Robert Lutz	4	2	6	5
5	(United States) Arthur Ashe	6	6	4	7
6	(Australia) John Newcombe	8	3	6	7
3	(Netherlands) Tom Okker	6	6	1	5
7	(United States) Clark Graebner	6	6	3	4	9
2	(Australia) Tony Roche	4	4	6	6	11

Semifinals
1	(Australia) Rod Laver	2	6	9	6
5	(United States) Arthur Ashe	6	2	7	0
6	(Australia) John Newcombe	3	6	14	6
2	(Australia) Tony Roche	6	1	12	4

Final
1	(Australia) Rod Laver	6	5	6	6
6	(Australia) John Newcombe	4	7	4	4

=== Top half ===
==== Section 1 ====
First round
1	(Australia) Rod Laver	6	6	6
(Italy) Nicola Pietrangeli	1	2	2
Q	(United States) Chauncey Steele	4	12	8	6
(India) Premjit Lall	6	10	10	8
(Denmark) Jan Leschly	6	7	6
(Australia) Ken Fletcher	4	5	2
(France) Jean-Loup Rouyer	6	5	6	5	6
LL	(Australia) Barry Geraghty	2	7	4	7	3
16	(United States) Stan Smith	20	6	9	4	6
(Australia) Allan Stone	22	4	7	6	3
(United Kingdom) David Lloyd	8	6	7
(Hungary) István Gulyás	6	4	5
(United States) Donald Dell	3	6	2	1
(Australia) Bill Bowrey	6	3	6	6
(Brazil) Thomaz Koch	8	3	7	3	4
(France) Georges Goven	6	6	5	6	6

Second round
1	(Australia) R Laver	3	4	6	6	6
(India) P Lall	6	6	3	0	0
(Denmark) J Leschly	6	22	6
(France) J-L Rouyer	4	20	4
16	(United States) S Smith	6	7	6
(United Kingdom) D Lloyd	3	5	1
(Australia) W Bowrey	8	6	6
(France) G Goven	6	4	3

Third round
1	(Australia) R Laver	6	6	6
(Denmark) J Leschly	3	3	3
16	(United States) S Smith	3	9	6	6
(Australia) W Bowrey	6	7	3	4

Fourth round
1	(Australia) R Laver	6	6	7	3	6
16	(United States) S Smith	4	2	9	6	3

==== Section 2 ====
First round
8	(South Africa) Cliff Drysdale	7	7	9
(Belgium) Patrick Hombergen	5	5	7
(Australia) Owen Davidson	6	6	6
Q	(United Kingdom) John Paish	1	2	3
(Australia) Barry Phillips-Moore	5	4	6	1
(Romania) Ion Țiriac	7	6	4	6
(United Kingdom) Mark Cox	7	6	6
(Spain) Manuel Orantes	5	4	3
9	(Australia) Roy Emerson	6	6	6
LL	(Austria) Peter Pokorny	1	1	1
Q	(United Kingdom) John Clifton	4	6	4	6	5
(United Kingdom) Stanley Matthews	6	3	6	2	7
(Soviet Union) Vladimir Korotkov	6	6	8
(United Kingdom) Mike Sangster	4	3	6
(Greece) Nicholas Kalogeropoulos	6	6	6
(Chile) Jaime Fillol	2	2	4

Second round
8	(South Africa) C Drysdale	6	6	11	6
(Australia) O Davidson	4	4	13	2
(Romania) I Țiriac	6	8	7	10
(United Kingdom) M Cox	2	10	9	12
9	(Australia) R Emerson	6	6	6
(United Kingdom) S Matthews	3	1	2
(Soviet Union) V Korotkov	6	4	3	6	3
(Greece) N Kalogeropoulos	2	6	6	3	6

Third round
8	(South Africa) C Drysdale	6	11	6
(United Kingdom) M Cox	2	9	4
9	(Australia) R Emerson	7	6	6
(Greece) N Kalogeropoulos	5	3	2

Fourth round
8	(South Africa) C Drysdale	6	6	0	6	9
9	(Australia) R Emerson	4	8	6	3	7

==== Section 3 ====
First round
4	(Australia) Ken Rosewall	6	6	6
(Poland) Wiesław Gąsiorek	1	1	2
(United Kingdom) Roger Taylor	6	13	6
(United States) Vic Seixas	4	11	2
(United States) Bob Lutz	6	6	6
Q	(Czechoslovakia) Štěpán Koudelka	1	1	0
(Czechoslovakia) Jan Kodeš	6	3	5	6	6
(Chile) Patricio Cornejo	3	6	7	3	1
13	(South Africa) Ray Moore	3	2	11	4
(Australia) John Alexander	6	6	9	6
(South Africa) Gordon Forbes	4	6	3
(New Zealand) Onny Parun	6	8	6
Q	(Australia) Allan McDonald	5	5	6
(France) Jean-Pierre Courcol	7	7	8
(Australia) Terry Addison	9	6	6
LL	(Ecuador) Eduardo Zuleta	7	3	3

Second round
4	(Australia) K Rosewall	6	6	8
(United Kingdom) R Taylor	1	4	6
(United States) R Lutz	2	4	6	6	7
(Czechoslovakia) J Kodeš	6	6	1	2	5
(Australia) J Alexander	7	6	6
(New Zealand) O Parun	5	4	3
(France) J-P Courcol	3	2	6	5
(Australia) T Addison	6	6	3	7

Third round
4	(Australia) K Rosewall	6	9	3	2
(United States) R Lutz	8	7	6	6
(Australia) J Alexander	6	8	13	3	6
(Australia) T Addison	3	10	11	6	3

Fourth round
(United States) R Lutz	9	4	3	6	6
(Australia) J Alexander	7	6	6	4	4

==== Section 4 ====
First round
5	(United States) Arthur Ashe	1	11	6	7
(United States) Marty Riessen	6	9	3	5
(Denmark) Torben Ulrich	6	4	4	7
(South Africa) Terry Ryan	4	6	6	9
(United Kingdom) Graham Stilwell	6	3	8	4	6
(United Kingdom) Keith Wooldridge	2	6	6	6	1
(United Kingdom) Alan Mills	6	2	6	5	12
(West Germany) Ingo Buding	2	6	4	7	14
12	(United States) Pancho Gonzales	22	1	16	6	11
(United States) Charlie Pasarell	24	6	14	3	9
(United Kingdom) John Barrett	4	4	2
(Sweden) Ove Bengtson	6	6	6
(United States) Tom Edlefsen	6	3	9	6
(United States) Roy Barth	3	6	7	3
(Australia) Ray Keldie	12	4	6	6
(Soviet Union) Sergei Likhachev	10	6	4	4

Second round
5	(United States) A Ashe	3	4	6	6	6
(South Africa) T Ryan	6	6	3	2	2
(United Kingdom) G Stilwell	6	6	6
(West Germany) I Buding	3	2	4
12	(United States) R Gonzales	6	6	6
(Sweden) O Bengtson	4	3	3
(United States) T Edlefsen	8	6	4	5	6
(Australia) R Keldie	6	3	6	7	4

Third round
5	(United States) A Ashe	6	1	6	13	12
(United Kingdom) G Stilwell	2	6	2	15	10
12	(United States) R Gonzales	6	6	6
(United States) T Edlefsen	4	3	2

Fourth round
5	(United States) A Ashe	7	4	6	6
12	(United States) R Gonzales	5	6	3	3

=== Bottom half ===
==== Section 5 ====
First round
(United Kingdom) Gerald Battrick	6	3	4	6	6
LL	(Poland) Tadeusz Nowicki	4	6	6	4	4
(Czechoslovakia) Milan Holeček	6	5	11	6
Q	(United States) Erik van Dillen	3	7	9	4
(South Africa) Bob Maud	6	6	6
LL	(Japan) Keishiro Yanagi	4	1	2
(United Kingdom) Paul Hutchins	4	8	4
11	(Australia) Fred Stolle	6	10	6
(France) Daniel Contet	4	9	8	4
(Australia) Mal Anderson	6	11	6	6
(Denmark) Jørgen Ulrich	1	4	6	4
(Australia) John Cooper	6	6	1	6
(New Zealand) Brian Fairlie	6	8	6
(Chile) Patricio Rodríguez	2	6	3
(Socialist Federal Republic of Yugoslavia) Nikola Pilić	10	4	6	5
6	(Australia) John Newcombe	12	6	4	7

Second round
(United Kingdom) G Battrick	3	7	1	6	3
(Czechoslovakia) M Holeček	6	5	6	4	6
(South Africa) R Maud	17	6	0	5
11	(Australia) F Stolle	19	2	6	7
(Australia) M Anderson	13	8	6
(Australia) J Cooper	11	6	4
(New Zealand) B Fairlie	5	4	4
6	(Australia) J Newcombe	7	6	6

Third round
(Czechoslovakia) M Holeček	2	4	2
11	(Australia) F Stolle	6	6	6
(Australia) M Anderson	2	3	1
6	(Australia) J Newcombe	6	6	6

Fourth round
11	(Australia) F Stolle	4	5	6	3
6	(Australia) J Newcombe	6	7	3	6

==== Section 6 ====
First round
Q	(United States) Billy Higgins	4	2	4
(United Kingdom) Bobby Wilson	6	6	6
(Socialist Federal Republic of Yugoslavia) Željko Franulović	7	6	6	7	10
(Soviet Union) Toomas Leius	5	8	3	9	8
(Australia) Bob Carmichael	5	6	7	6
(Brazil) José Edison Mandarino	7	1	5	4
(United States) Cliff Richey	0	6	6	6	9
14	(South Africa) Bob Hewitt	6	4	8	2	7
Q	(South Africa) Rayno Seegers	5	3	1
(Australia) Dick Crealy	7	6	6
(Jamaica) Richard Russell	4	14	5	6	6
(Switzerland) Dimitri Sturdza	6	12	7	3	4
(United States) Ronnie Holmberg	8	4	6	2	7
(United States) Alex Olmedo	6	6	4	6	5
(United Arab Republic) Ismail El Shafei	3	8	4
3	(Netherlands) Tom Okker	6	10	6

Second round
(United Kingdom) R Wilson	6	3	7	5	6
(Socialist Federal Republic of Yugoslavia) Z Franulović	4	6	5	7	0
(Australia) B Carmichael	2	6	7	6
(United States) C Richey	6	4	5	4
(Australia) D Crealy	9	6	6
(Jamaica) R Russell	7	4	4
(United States) R Holmberg	6	6	1	4	2
3	(Netherlands) T Okker	3	2	6	6	6

Third round
(United Kingdom) R Wilson	6	6	15
(Australia) B Carmichael	1	4	13
(Australia) D Crealy	6	3	2	4
3	(Netherlands) T Okker	4	6	6	6

Fourth round
(United Kingdom) R Wilson	9	4	2
3	(Netherlands) T Okker	11	6	6

==== Section 7 ====
First round
(Australia) Phil Dent	6	6	6
(Ecuador) Pancho Guzmán	4	2	3
(Australia) Bob Giltinan	9	6	11	6	2
(France) François Jauffret	11	2	13	2	6
(Socialist Federal Republic of Yugoslavia) Nikola Špear	4	1	1
(Soviet Union) Alex Metreveli	6	6	6
(South Africa) Frew McMillan	3	4	6	1
10	(Spain) Andrés Gimeno	6	6	3	6
(United States) Gene Scott	16	4	4
(France) Pierre Barthès	18	6	6
(United States) Tom Gorman	3	6	3	8	4
(Romania) Ilie Năstase	6	4	6	6	6
(Australia) John Brown	9	6	7
Q	(Australia) John Bartlett	7	2	5
(Australia) Ray Ruffels	4	6	3
7	(United States) Clark Graebner	6	8	6

Second round
(Australia) P Dent	6	6	6	2	6
(France) F Jauffret	4	8	4	6	4
(Soviet Union) A Metreveli	3	6	1	6	3
10	(Spain) A Gimeno	6	3	6	3	6
(France) P Barthès	2	4	6	3
(Romania) I Năstase	6	6	3	6
(Australia) J Brown	2	0^{r}
7	(United States) C Graebner	6	3

Third round
(Australia) P Dent	6	8	3	4	4
10	(Spain) A Gimeno	2	6	6	6	6
(Romania) I Năstase	5	6	4
7	(United States) C Graebner	7	8	6

Fourth round
10	(Spain) A Gimeno	9	5^{r}
7	(United States) C Graebner	7	6

==== Section 8 ====
First round
(United States) Jim McManus	2	6	6	4	6
(United States) Butch Buchholz	6	4	1	6	8
(Chile) Luis Ayala	6	6	12
(Australia) Bob Howe	4	2	10
(Czechoslovakia) Jan Kukal	16	6	8
Q	(South Africa) Julian Krinsky	14	3	6
(India) Jaidip Mukerjea	2	6	5
15	(United States) Dennis Ralston	6	8	7
(West Germany) Hans-Joachim Plötz	6	3	6	6
(United Kingdom) Peter Curtis	2	6	4	1
(Japan) Koji Watanabe	6	7	6
(France) Patrice Beust	3	5	3
(South Africa) Abe Segal	6	6	6
(Italy) Eugenio Castigliano	2	1	3
(France) Jean-Claude Barclay	5	6	3	2
2	(Australia) Tony Roche	7	4	6	6

Second round
(United States) E Buchholz	8	6	6
(Chile) L Ayala	6	2	4
(Czechoslovakia) J Kukal	5	2	4
15	(United States) D Ralston	7	6	6
(West Germany) H-J Plötz	9	3	9	9
(Japan) K Watanabe	7	6	7	7
(South Africa) A Segal	1	2	0
2	(Australia) A Roche	6	6	6

Third round
(United States) E Buchholz	4	2	5
15	(United States) D Ralston	6	6	7
(West Germany) H-J Plötz	1	7	4
2	(Australia) A Roche	6	9	6

Fourth round
15	(United States) D Ralston	3	6	5	10	2
2	(Australia) A Roche	6	4	7	8	6

Preceded by 1969 French Open	Grand Slams; Men's Singles	Succeeded by 1969 U.S. Open
