= 1969 Wimbledon Championships – Boys' singles =

Boys' singles
- 1969 Wimbledon Championships

Final
- Champion: (South Africa) Byron Bertram
- Runner-up: (Australia) John Alexander
- Score: 7–5, 5–7, 6–4

Events
Singles	men	women		boys	girls
Doubles	men	women	mixed	boys	girls
← 1968 ·	Wimbledon Championships	· 1970 →

Byron Bertram defeated the defending champion John Alexander in the final, 7–5, 5–7, 6–4 to win the boys' singles tennis title at the 1969 Wimbledon Championships.

== Draw ==
=== Key ===
- Q = Qualifier
- WC = Wild card
- LL = Lucky loser
- Alt = Alternate
- SE = Special exempt
- PR = Protected ranking
- ITF = ITF entry
- JE = Junior exempt
- w/o = Walkover
- r = Retired
- d = Defaulted
- SR = Special ranking

=== Finals ===
Semifinals
(India) Anand Amritraj	4	3
(Australia) John Alexander	6	6
(South Africa) Byron Bertram	9	6	6
(Sweden) Kjell Johansson	7	8	4

Final
(Australia) John Alexander	5	7	4
(South Africa) Byron Bertram	7	5	6

=== Top half ===
First round
(India) Anand Amritraj	3
(Greece) G Okalidis	0^{r}
(Belgium) Robert Van Malder	3	4
(Poland) Jacek Niedźwiedzki	6	6
(Norway) T Torkildsen	1	0
(Czechoslovakia) Jan Písecký	6	6
(United States) Dick Stockton	6	6
(Austria) E Walter	0	1
(Australia) John Alexander
(Venezuela) Jorge Andrew	w/o
(Netherlands) Paul van Min	8	6	7
(Switzerland) Rolf Spitzer	10	4	5

Second round
(Denmark) J Steen-Hansen	3	1
(France) Jacques Thamin	6	6
(India) A Amritraj	6	6
(Poland) J Niedźwiedzki	3	3
(Czechoslovakia) J Písecký	7	2	4
(United States) R Stockton	5	6	6
(Australia) J Alexander	6	6
(Netherlands) P van Min	3	1

Quarterfinals
(France) J Thamin	1	4
(India) A Amritraj	6	6
(United States) R Stockton	4	6
(Australia) J Alexander	6	8

Semifinals
(India) A Amritraj	4	3
(Australia) J Alexander	6	6

=== Bottom half ===
First round
(United Kingdom) Stephen Warboys	6	6
(Republic of Ireland) D Hill	1	4
(South Africa) Byron Bertram	6	6
(West Germany) Frank Gebert	4	2
(Mexico) Emilio Montaño	4	3
(Brazil) AA Pereira	6	6
(Sudan) Samir Farid	1	1
(Argentina) Guillermo Vilas	6	6
(Spain) Antonio Muñoz	6	6
(Uganda) Eustace Kigongo	1	3

Second round
(United Kingdom) S Warboys	8	4
(South Africa) B Bertram	10	6
(Brazil) AA Pereira	2	4
(Argentina) G Vilas	6	6
(Spain) A Muñoz	6	3	5
(Soviet Union) Viktor Kazakevitch	4	6	7
(Socialist Federal Republic of Yugoslavia) Alexander Nigrinović	10	1
(Sweden) Kjell Johansson	12	6

Quarterfinals
(South Africa) B Bertram	6	6
(Argentina) G Vilas	4	2
(Soviet Union) V Kazakevitch	6	2	2
(Sweden) K Johansson	1	6	6

Semifinals
(South Africa) B Bertram	9	6	6
(Sweden) K Johansson	7	8	4
