= 1970 Wimbledon Championships – Girls' singles =

Girls' singles
- 1970 Wimbledon Championships

Final
- Champion: (United States) Sharon Walsh
- Runner-up: (Soviet Union) Marina Kroschina
- Score: 8–6, 6–4

Details
- Draw: 23

Events
Singles	men	women		boys	girls
Doubles	men	women	mixed	boys	girls
← 1969 ·	Wimbledon Championships	· 1971 →

Sharon Walsh defeated Marina Kroschina in the final, 8–6, 6–4 to win the girls' singles tennis title at the 1970 Wimbledon Championships.

== Draw ==
=== Key ===
- Q = Qualifier
- WC = Wild card
- LL = Lucky loser
- Alt = Alternate
- SE = Special exempt
- PR = Protected ranking
- ITF = ITF entry
- JE = Junior exempt
- w/o = Walkover
- r = Retired
- d = Defaulted
- SR = Special ranking

=== Finals ===
Semifinals
(Soviet Union) Marina Kroschina	3	6	6
(United Kingdom) Lindsay Blachford	6	3	1
(United States) Sharon Walsh	6	6
(Republic of Ireland) Sue Minford	2	1

Final
(Soviet Union) Marina Kroschina	6	4
(United States) Sharon Walsh	8	6

=== Top half ===
First round
(Hungary) B Klein	0	1
(Argentina) Beatriz Araujo	6	6
(Sweden) I Larsson	3	6	2
(West Germany) H Reetmeyer	6	1	6
(United Kingdom) Lindsay Blachford	6	6
(Austria) M Huegl	4	2
(France) Sylvie Pruvot	9	4	4
(Italy) Rosalba Vido	7	6	6

Second round
(Canada) T Savard	1	1
(Australia) Pat Edwards	6	6
(Norway) K Hansen	2	0
(Soviet Union) Marina Kroschina	6	6
(Argentina) B Araujo	6	6
(West Germany) H Reetmeyer	3	0
(United Kingdom) L Blachford	8	6
(Italy) R Vido	6	3

Quarterfinals
(Australia) P Edwards	9	2	4
(Soviet Union) M Kroschina	7	6	6
(Argentina) B Araujo	2	2
(United Kingdom) L Blachford	6	6

Semifinals
(Soviet Union) Marina Kroschina	3	6	6
(United Kingdom) L Blachford	6	3	1

=== Bottom half ===
First round
(Denmark) L Solbeck	2	1
(Netherlands) D Falkenburg	6	6
(Poland) J Rozala	6	6
(Switzerland) M Stoll	3	2
(United States) Sharon Walsh	6	6
(Czechoslovakia) M Kočišková	2	0

Second round
(Netherlands) D Falkenburg	6	6
(Poland) J Rozala	4	0
(United States) S Walsh	6	6
(Monaco) L Vanderpol	0	0
(Belgium) Monique Gurdal	2	2
(Republic of Ireland) Sue Minford	6	6
(New Zealand) Marilyn Pryde	0	0
(Socialist Federal Republic of Yugoslavia) V Husnjak	6	6

Quarterfinals
(Netherlands) D Falkenburg	2	2
(United States) S Walsh	6	6
(Republic of Ireland) S Minford	3	6	6
(Socialist Federal Republic of Yugoslavia) V Husnjak	6	4	1

Semifinals
(United States) S Walsh	6	6
(Republic of Ireland) S Minford	2	1
