= 1969 Wimbledon Championships =

- Date: 23 June – 5 July
- Edition: 83rd
- Category: Grand Slam
- Prize money: £33,370
- Surface: Grass
- Location: Church Road; SW19, Wimbledon, London, United Kingdom
- Venue: All England Lawn Tennis and Croquet Club

Champions

Men's singles
- (Australia) Rod Laver

Women's singles
- (United Kingdom) Ann Jones

Men's doubles
- (Australia) John Newcombe / (Australia) Tony Roche

Women's doubles
- (Australia) Margaret Court / (Australia) Judy Tegart

Mixed doubles
- (Australia) Fred Stolle / (United Kingdom) Ann Jones

Boys' singles
- (South Africa) Byron Bertram

Girls' singles
- (Japan) Kazuko Sawamatsu
← 1968 ·	Wimbledon Championships	· 1970 →

The 1969 Wimbledon Championships was a combined men's and women's tennis tournament that was played on outdoor grass courts. It was the second edition of the Wimbledon Championships in the Open Era and the 83rd since its formation. It was held at the All England Lawn Tennis and Croquet Club at Wimbledon, London from Monday 23 June until Saturday 5 July 1969. Ann Jones became the first British champion of the open era, the first victor since 1961; Britain would have to wait 8 years, until the 1977 tournament to see another British winner in the singles competition – Virginia Wade. Rod Laver won the men's singles title, his fourth Wimbledon crown after 1961, 1962 and 1968, and went on to win his second Grand Slam after 1962.

41-year-old Pancho Gonzales beat Charlie Pasarell in a first-round men's singles match by a score of 22–24, 1–6, 16–14, 6–3, 11–9. At 112 games and 5 hours 20 minutes it was by far the longest match of the time. The match led to the introduction of the tiebreak in tennis. The 112-game record lasted 41 years until the Isner–Mahut match at the 2010 Wimbledon Championships.

== Prize money ==
The total prize money for 1969 championships was £33,370. The winner of the men's title earned £3,000 while the women's singles champion earned £1.500.

Event	W	F	SF	QF	Round of 16	Round of 32	Round of 64	Round of 128
Men's singles	£3,000	£1,500	£800	£450	£175	£125	£80	£50
Women's singles	£1,500	£750	£350	£200	£125	£90	£70	£50
Men's doubles *	£1,000	£600	£400	£200	£0	£0	£0	—
Women's doubles*	£600	£400	£200	£100	£0	£0	£0	—
Mixed doubles*	£500	£350	£175	£100	£0	£0	£0	£0

_{* per team}

== Champions ==
=== Seniors ===
==== Men's singles ====
(Australia) Rod Laver defeated (Australia) John Newcombe, 6–4, 5–7, 6–4, 6–4

==== Women's singles ====
(United Kingdom) Ann Jones defeated (United States) Billie Jean King, 3–6, 6–3, 6–2

==== Men's doubles ====
(Australia) John Newcombe / (Australia) Tony Roche defeated (Netherlands) Tom Okker / (United States) Marty Riessen, 7–5, 11–9, 6–3

==== Women's doubles ====
(Australia) Margaret Court / (Australia) Judy Tegart defeated (United States) Patti Hogan / (United States) Peggy Michel, 9–7, 6–2

==== Mixed doubles ====
(Australia) Fred Stolle / (United Kingdom) Ann Jones defeated (Australia) Tony Roche / (Australia) Judy Tegart, 6–2, 6–3

=== Juniors ===
==== Boys' singles ====
(South Africa) Byron Bertram defeated (Australia) John Alexander, 7–5, 5–7, 6–4

==== Girls' singles ====
(Japan) Kazuko Sawamatsu defeated (South Africa) Brenda Kirk, 6–1, 1–6, 7–5

== Singles seeds ==
=== Men's singles ===
1. (Australia) Rod Laver (champion)
2. (Australia) Tony Roche (semifinals, lost to John Newcombe)
3. (Netherlands) Tom Okker (quarterfinals, lost to John Newcombe)
4. (Australia) Ken Rosewall (third round, lost to Bob Lutz)
5. (United States) Arthur Ashe (semifinals, lost to Rod Laver)
6. (Australia) John Newcombe (final, lost to Rod Laver)
7. (United States) Clark Graebner (third round, lost to Bob Hewitt)
8. (South Africa) Cliff Drysdale (quarterfinals, lost to Rod Laver)
9. (Australia) Roy Emerson (fourth round, lost to Cliff Drysdale)
10. (Spain) Andrés Gimeno (fourth round, lost to Clark Graebner)
11. (Australia) Fred Stolle (fourth round, lost to John Newcombe)
12. (United States) Pancho Gonzales (fourth round, lost to Arthur Ashe)
13. (South Africa) Ray Moore (first round, lost to John Alexander)
14. (South Africa) Bob Hewitt (first round, lost to Cliff Richey)
15. (United States) Dennis Ralston (fourth round, lost to Tony Roche)
16. (United States) Stan Smith (first round, lost to Allan Stone)

=== Women's singles ===
1. (Australia) Margaret Court (semifinals, lost to Ann Jones)
2. (United States) Billie Jean King (final, lost to Ann Jones)
3. (United Kingdom) Virginia Wade (third round, lost to Pat Walkden)
4. (United Kingdom) Ann Jones (champion)
5. (United States) Nancy Richey (quarterfinals, lost to Ann Jones)
6. (Australia) Kerry Melville (second round, lost to Rosemary Casals)
7. (United States) Julie Heldman (quarterfinals, lost to Margaret Court)
8. (Australia) Judy Tegart (quarterfinals, lost to Billie Jean King)

Preceded by 1969 French Open	Grand Slams	Succeeded by 1969 US Open
