= 1969 Wimbledon Championships – Women's singles =

Women's singles
- 1969 Wimbledon Championships

Final
- Champion: (United Kingdom) Ann Jones
- Runner-up: (United States) Billie Jean King
- Score: 3–6, 6–3, 6–2

Details
- Draw: 96 (8 Q )
- Seeds: 8

Events
Singles	men	women		boys	girls
Doubles	men	women	mixed	boys	girls
← 1968 ·	Wimbledon Championships	· 1970 →

Ann Jones defeated three-time defending champion Billie Jean King in the final, 3–6, 6–3, 6–2 to win the ladies' singles tennis title at the 1969 Wimbledon Championships. It was her first Wimbledon singles title, and her third and last major singles title overall.

== Seeds ==
1. (Australia) Margaret Court (semifinals)
2. (United States) Billie Jean King (final)
3. (United Kingdom) Virginia Wade (third round)
4. (United Kingdom) Ann Jones (champion)
5. (United States) Nancy Richey (quarterfinals)
6. (Australia) Kerry Melville (second round)
7. (United States) Julie Heldman (quarterfinals)
8. (Australia) Judy Tegart (quarterfinals)

Click on the seed number of a player to go to their draw section.

== Draw ==
=== Key ===
- Q = Qualifier
- WC = Wild card
- LL = Lucky loser
- Alt = Alternate
- ITF = ITF entry
- PR = Protected ranking
- SR = Special ranking
- SE = Special exempt
- JE = Junior exempt
- JR = Junior Accelerator Programme entrant
- CO = College Accelerator Programme entrant
- NG = Next Gen Accelerator Program entrant
- w/o = Walkover
- r = Retired
- d = Defaulted

=== Finals ===
Quarterfinals
1	(Australia) Margaret Court	4	6	6
7	(United States) Julie Heldman	6	3	3
4	(United Kingdom) Ann Jones	6	7
5	(United States) Nancy Richey	2	5
(United States) Rosemary Casals	3	9	7
(Australia) Lesley Bowrey	6	7	5
8	(Australia) Judy Tegart	6	5	6
2	(United States) Billie Jean King	4	7	8

Semifinals
1	(Australia) Margaret Court	12	3	2
4	(United Kingdom) Ann Jones	10	6	6
(United States) Rosemary Casals	1	0
2	(United States) Billie Jean King	6	6

Final
4	(United Kingdom) Ann Jones	3	6	6
2	(United States) Billie Jean King	6	3	2

=== Top half ===
==== Section 1 ====
First round

Second round
1	(Australia) M Court	6	6
(United States) BA Grubb	4	0
(Australia) H Gourlay	4	6	6
(Netherlands) B Stöve	6	3	4
(Czechoslovakia) A Palmeová	3	8	7
(France) C Spinoza	6	6	5
(United Kingdom) C Janes	6	5	6
(South Africa) E Emmanuel	3	7	1

Third round
1	(Australia) M Court	6	6
(Australia) H Gourlay	1	0
(Czechoslovakia) A Palmeová	1	1
(United Kingdom) C Janes	6	6

Fourth round
1	(Australia) M Court	6	6
(United Kingdom) C Janes	2	0

==== Section 2 ====
First round

Second round
7	(United States) J Heldman	6	6
(United Kingdom) J Cooper	2	3
(United States) D Carter	4	6	6
(Canada) F Urban	6	2	2
(Soviet Union) O Morozova	6	6
LL	(Netherlands) T Zwaan	3	4
(South Africa) M Proctor	6	6
(Argentina) G Moran	3	0

Third round
7	(United States) J Heldman	6	6
(United States) D Carter	2	3
(Soviet Union) O Morozova	6	1	6
(South Africa) M Proctor	3	6	4

Fourth round
7	(United States) J Heldman	6	6
(Soviet Union) O Morozova	4	3

==== Section 3 ====
First round
4	(United Kingdom) A Jones	6	6
(Spain) C Mandarino	0	1
Q	(United Kingdom) M Boundy	2	0
(United Kingdom) S Tutt	6	6
(South Africa) B Kirk	3	6	4
Q	(South Africa) J Wilshere	6	2	6
(Argentina) R Giscafré	1	2
(France) R Darmon	6	6
(United Kingdom) C Molesworth	2	4
(South Africa) A van Deventer	6	6
Q	(Indonesia) L Liem	6	6
Q	(United Kingdom) W Hall	3	4
(United Kingdom) F Taylor	7	1
(Sweden) C Sandberg	9	6
(United States) M Michel	6	6
(Australia) L Hunt	1	4

Second round
4	(United Kingdom) A Jones	6	6
(United Kingdom) S Tutt	0	1
Q	(South Africa) J Wilshere	1	6	1
(France) R Darmon	6	2	6
(South Africa) A van Deventer	6	2	8
Q	(Indonesia) L Liem	0	6	6
(Sweden) C Sandberg	3	0
(United States) M Michel	6	6

Third round
4	(United Kingdom) Jones	6	6
(France) R Darmon	1	2
(South Africa) A van Deventer	4	2
(United States) M Michel	6	6

Fourth round
4	(United Kingdom) A Jones	6	9
(United States) M Michel	0	7

==== Section 4 ====
First round
5	(United States) N Richey	6	6
(Finland) B Lindström	1	1
(Australia) J Young	6	7	3
(South Africa) W Tomlinson	2	9	6
(Italy) L Bassi	1	2
(United States) J Bartkowicz	6	6
(United Kingdom) J Williams	6	6
(United Kingdom) S Holdsworth	1	1
(Ecuador) ME Guzmán	1	4
(United Kingdom) S Brasher	6	6
(Japan) K Sawamatsu	9	4
(Australia) K Krantzcke	11	6
(Netherlands) M Schaar	6	3	6
(United Kingdom) R Lloyd	4	6	4
Q	(United States) P Teeguarden	6	6
(United States) M Aschner	3	2

Second round
5	(United States) N Richey	6	6
(South Africa) W Tomlinson	3	4
(United States) J Bartkowicz	6	6
(United Kingdom) J Williams	2	0
(United Kingdom) S Brasher	1	4
(Australia) K Krantzcke	6	6
(Netherlands) M Schaar	6	4	1
Q	(United States) P Teeguarden	2	6	6

Third round
5	(United States) N Richey	6	8
(United States) J Bartkowicz	4	6
(Australia) K Krantzcke	6	6
Q	(United States) P Teeguarden	0	0

Fourth round
5	(United States) N Richey	4	6	7
(Australia) K Krantzcke	6	3	5

=== Bottom half ===
==== Section 5 ====
First round
(Australia) H Amos	6	6
(United Kingdom) A Soady	2	4
(Sweden) E Lundquist	4	9	2
(Brazil) S Petersen	6	7	6
(United States) S Grant	7	6	1
(Australia) K Harris	9	2	6
(Australia) C Sherriff	0	1
(United States) T Fretz	6	6
(France) F Dürr	6	6
(United Kingdom) J Townsend	2	3
Q	(United States) J Anthony	6	6
(Netherlands) J Salomé	1	0
(United States) V Ziegenfuss	1	5
(United States) R Casals	6	7
(South Africa) L Rossouw	0	2
6	(Australia) K Melville	6	6

Second round
(Australia) H Amos	6	3	6
(Brazil) S Petersen	4	6	4
(Australia) K Harris	6	3	7
(United States) T Fretz	4	6	5
(France) F Dürr	6	3	4
Q	(United States) J Anthony	0	6	6
(United States) R Casals	6	7
6	(Australia) K Melville	2	5

Third round
(Australia) H Amos	1	4
(Australia) K Harris	6	6
Q	(United States) J Anthony	1	3
(United States) R Casals	6	6

Fourth round
(Australia) K Harris	2	2
(United States) R Casals	6	6

==== Section 6 ====
First round
(France) G Chanfreau	6	6
(Spain) AM Estalella	0	1
(Italy) MT Riedl	3	1
(United States) M-A Curtis	6	6
(Australia) L Bowrey	6	8
Q	(United Kingdom) E Ernest	4	6
(Argentina) AM Arias	1	6	1
(Netherlands) A Suurbeek	6	4	6
(Rhodesia) P Walkden	8	6
(United States) C Martinez	6	1
Q	(Indonesia) L Kaligis	2	3
(United States) P Hogan	6	6
(Australia) F Moore	6	6
(West Germany) K Seelbach	3	3
(United States) L Tuero	4	4
3	(United Kingdom) V Wade	6	6

Second round
(France) G Chanfreau	5	2
(United States) M-A Curtis	7	6
(Australia) L Bowrey	6	6
(Netherlands) A Suurbeek	1	3
(Rhodesia) P Walkden	6	7
(United States) P Hogan	4	5
(Australia) F Moore	1	2
3	(United Kingdom) V Wade	6	6

Third round
(United States) M-A Curtis	10	4	2
(Australia) L Bowrey	8	6	6
(Rhodesia) P Walkden	7	6
3	(United Kingdom) V Wade	5	1

Fourth round
(Australia) L Bowrey	6	1	8
(Rhodesia) P Walkden	3	6	6

==== Section 7 ====
First round

Second round
(Australia) W Gilchrist	6	5	9
(Netherlands) A Bakker	3	7	7
(United Kingdom) J Congdon	1	2
(United Kingdom) E Truman	6	6
(United Kingdom) W Shaw	6	6
(Belgium) I Loeys	1	1
(Czechoslovakia) V Vopičková	1	0
8	(Australia) J Tegart	6	6

Third round
(Australia) W Gilchrist	6	4	1
(United Kingdom) E Truman	3	6	6
(United Kingdom) W Shaw	0	5
8	(Australia) J Tegart	6	7

Fourth round
(United Kingdom) E Truman	4	4
8	(Australia) J Tegart	6	6

==== Section 8 ====
First round

Second round
(Soviet Union) M Chuvirina	2	2
(United States) K Pigeon	6	6
(United States) C Graebner	1	3
(Italy) L Pericoli	6	6
(South Africa) M Brummer	6	4	7
(France) É Terras	4	6	5
(South Africa) B Vukovich	2	1
2	(United States) BJ King	6	6

Third round
(United States) K Pigeon	4	6	6
(Italy) L Pericoli	6	1	2
(South Africa) M Brummer	0	4
2	(United States) BJ King	6	6

Fourth round
(United States) K Pigeon	3	2
2	(United States) BJ King	6	6

Preceded by 1969 French Open – Women's singles	Grand Slam women's singles	Succeeded by 1969 US Open – Women's singles
