= 1969 Wimbledon Championships – Girls' singles =

Girls' singles
- 1969 Wimbledon Championships

Final
- Champion: (Japan) Kazuko Sawamatsu
- Runner-up: (South Africa) Brenda Kirk
- Score: 6–3, 1–6, 7–5

Details
- Draw: 24

Events
Singles	men	women		boys	girls
Doubles	men	women	mixed	boys	girls
← 1968 ·	Wimbledon Championships	· 1970 →

Kazuko Sawamatsu defeated Brenda Kirk in the final, 6–3, 1–6, 7–5 to win the girls' singles tennis title at the 1969 Wimbledon Championships.

== Draw ==
=== Key ===
- Q = Qualifier
- WC = Wild card
- LL = Lucky loser
- Alt = Alternate
- SE = Special exempt
- PR = Protected ranking
- ITF = ITF entry
- JE = Junior exempt
- w/o = Walkover
- r = Retired
- d = Defaulted
- SR = Special ranking

=== Finals ===
Semifinals
(Australia) Janet Young	3	3
(South Africa) Brenda Kirk	6	6
(Japan) Kazuko Sawamatsu	7	4	6
(Soviet Union) Zaiga Jansone	5	6	2

Final
(South Africa) Brenda Kirk	3	6	5
(Japan) Kazuko Sawamatsu	6	1	7

=== Top half ===
First round
(Belgium) G Leutteken	1	1
(South Africa) Brenda Kirk	6	6
(Republic of Ireland) Sue Minford	1	4
(Argentina) Beatriz Araujo	6	6
(Italy) Rosalba Vido	1	4
(United Kingdom) Veronica Burton	6	6
(Denmark) L Solbeck	6	2	8
(Switzerland) M Chessex	0	6	6

Second round
(Finland) Laila Pirilä	7	6
(Brazil) R Ferreira	5	4
(Australia) Janet Young	6	6
(France) Anne-Marie Cassaigne	0	3
(South Africa) B Kirk	6	6
(Argentina) B Araujo	3	1
(United Kingdom) V Burton	6	6
(Denmark) L Solbeck	0	2

Quarterfinals
(Finland) L Pirilä	2	1
(Australia) J Young	6	6
(South Africa) B Kirk	6	6
(United Kingdom) V Burton	1	2

Semifinals
(Australia) J Young	3	3
(South Africa) B Kirk	6	6

=== Bottom half ===
First round
(Socialist Federal Republic of Yugoslavia) Lena Dvornik	0	0
(United States) Pam Teeguarden	6	6
(Sweden) AC Dahlberg	1	0
(Japan) Kazuko Sawamatsu	6	6
(Greece) A Koutsouris	4	2
(Netherlands) Nina Blom	6	6
(Canada) Jane O'Hara	6	2	6
(Czechoslovakia) Mirka Koželuhová	1	6	3

Second round
(United States) P Teeguarden	1	2
(Japan) K Sawamatsu	6	6
(Netherlands) N Blom	6	3	6
(Canada) J O'Hara	4	6	3
(Belgium) C Vaugheluwe	0	3
(Soviet Union) Zaiga Jansone	6	6
(Norway) H Hancke	1	5
(Austria) A Joiser	6	7

Quarterfinals
(Japan) K Sawamatsu	6	6
(Netherlands) N Blom	4	0
(Soviet Union) Z Jansone	6	6
(Austria) A Joiser	1	0

Semifinals
(Japan) K Sawamatsu	7	4	6
(Soviet Union) Z Jansone	5	6	2
