= 1970 Wimbledon Championships =

- Date: 22 June – 4 July
- Edition: 84th
- Category: Grand Slam
- Prize money: £41,650
- Surface: Grass
- Location: Church Road; SW19, Wimbledon, London, United Kingdom
- Venue: All England Lawn Tennis and Croquet Club

Champions

Men's singles
- (Australia) John Newcombe

Women's singles
- (Australia) Margaret Court

Men's doubles
- (Australia) John Newcombe / (Australia) Tony Roche

Women's doubles
- (United States) Rosie Casals / (United States) Billie Jean King

Mixed doubles
- (Romania) Ilie Năstase / (United States) Rosie Casals

Boys' singles
- (South Africa) Byron Bertram

Girls' singles
- (United States) Sharon Walsh
- Wimbledon Championships

The 1970 Wimbledon Championships was a tennis tournament that took place on the outdoor grass courts at the All England Lawn Tennis and Croquet Club in Wimbledon, London, United Kingdom. The tournament was held from Monday 22 June until Saturday 4 July 1970. It was the 84th staging of the Wimbledon Championships, and the third Grand Slam tennis event of 1970.

== Prize money ==
The total prize money for 1970 championships was £41,650. The winner of the men's title earned £3,000 while the women's singles champion earned £1.500.

Event	W	F	SF	QF	Round of 16	Round of 32	Round of 64	Round of 128
Men's singles	£3,000	£1,500	£800	£450	£220	£165	£125	£100
Women's singles	£1,500	£750	£400	£225	£150	£125	£100	£75
Men's doubles *	£1,000							—N/a
Women's doubles*	£600	£400	£200	£100	£0	£0	£0	—N/a
Mixed doubles*	£500							

_{* per team}

== Champions ==
=== Seniors ===
==== Men's singles ====
(Australia) John Newcombe defeated (Australia) Ken Rosewall, 5–7, 6–3, 6–2, 3–6, 6–1

- It was Newcombe's 3rd career Grand Slam title (his 1st in the Open Era), and his 2nd Wimbledon title.

==== Women's singles ====
(Australia) Margaret Court defeated (United States) Billie Jean King, 14–12, 11–9

- It was Court's 19th career Grand Slam title, and her 3rd (and last) Wimbledon title.

==== Men's doubles ====
(Australia) John Newcombe / (Australia) Tony Roche defeated (Australia) Ken Rosewall / (Australia) Fred Stolle, 10–8, 6–3, 6–1

==== Women's doubles ====
(United States) Rosie Casals / (United States) Billie Jean King defeated (France) Françoise Dürr / (United Kingdom) Virginia Wade, 6–2, 6–3

==== Mixed doubles ====
(Romania) Ilie Năstase / (United States) Rosie Casals defeated (Soviet Union) Alex Metreveli / (Soviet Union) Olga Morozova, 6–3, 4–6, 9–7

=== Juniors ===
==== Boys' singles ====
(South Africa) Byron Bertram defeated (West Germany) Frank Gebert, 6–0, 6–3

==== Girls' singles ====
(United States) Sharon Walsh defeated (Soviet Union) Marina Kroschina, 8–6, 6–4

== Singles seeds ==
=== Men's singles ===
1. (Australia) Rod Laver (fourth round, lost to Roger Taylor)
2. (Australia) John Newcombe (champion)
3. (United States) Arthur Ashe (fourth round, lost to Andrés Gimeno)
4. (Australia) Tony Roche (quarterfinals, lost to Ken Rosewall)
5. (Australia) Ken Rosewall (final, lost to John Newcombe)
6. (Socialist Federal Republic of Yugoslavia) Željko Franulović (third round, lost to Bob Carmichael)
7. (United States) Stan Smith (fourth round, lost to Roy Emerson)
8. (Romania) Ilie Năstase (fourth round, lost to Clark Graebner)
9. (United States) Clark Graebner (quarterfinals, lost to Roger Taylor)
10. (Australia) Roy Emerson (quarterfinals, lost to John Newcombe)
11. (Netherlands) Tom Okker (second round, lost to Bob Hewitt)
12. (South Africa) Cliff Drysdale (third round, lost to Tom Gorman)
13. (Czechoslovakia) Jan Kodeš (first round, lost to Alex Metreveli)
14. (Spain) Andrés Gimeno (semifinals, lost to John Newcombe)
15. (United States) Dennis Ralston (fourth round, lost to John Newcombe)
16. (United Kingdom) Roger Taylor (semifinals, lost to Ken Rosewall)

=== Women's singles ===
1. (Australia) Margaret Court (champion)
2. (United States) Billie Jean King (final, lost to Margaret Court)
3. (United Kingdom) Virginia Wade (fourth round, lost to Ceci Martinez)
4. (Australia) Kerry Melville (fourth round, lost to Winnie Shaw)
5. (United States) Rosie Casals (semifinals, lost to Margaret Court)
6. (United States) Julie Heldman (fourth round, lost to Françoise Dürr)
7. (Australia) Karen Krantzcke (quarterfinals, lost to Billie Jean King)
8. (West Germany) Helga Niessen (quarterfinals, lost to Margaret Court)

Preceded by 1970 French Open	Grand Slams	Succeeded by 1970 US Open
