= Štěpán Koudelka =

Czech tennis player (born 1945)

- Country (sports): Czechoslovakia
- Born: 21 February 1945 (age 80); Prague, Czechoslovakia

Singles
- Career record: 12–27

Grand Slam singles results
- French Open: 3R (1969, 1970)
- Wimbledon: 2R (1970)

Doubles

Grand Slam doubles results
- Wimbledon: 1R (1964, 1967)

Štěpán Koudelka (born 21 February 1945) is a Czech former professional tennis player.

Koudelka played Davis Cup for Czechoslovakia from 1963 to 1965, before relocating permanently to West Germany in the 1970s. During his career he twice reached the third round of the French Open and also featured in the main draw at Wimbledon. He had an upset win over reigning champion Tom Okker at the Belgian Open in 1971.

His wife, Joan Wilshere, is a South African who also played on the professional tennis tour. They live together in the north-west German city of Osnabrück.

== See also ==
- List of Czechoslovakia Davis Cup team representatives
