= Terry Ryan (tennis) =

South African tennis player

- Full name: Terence Ryan
- Country (sports): South Africa
- Born: 27 April 1942 (age 82); Johannesburg, South Africa

Singles
- Career record: 38–70
- Career titles: 0
- Highest ranking: No. 100 (3 June 1974)

Grand Slam singles results
- French Open: 3R (1968, 1971)
- Wimbledon: 3R (1966, 1970)
- US Open: 2R (1966)

Doubles
- Career record: 18–48
- Career titles: 0

Grand Slam doubles results
- French Open: 4R (1971)
- Wimbledon: 2R (1968, 1972)
- US Open: 3R (1971)

Terence Ryan (born 27 April 1942) is a former professional tennis player from South Africa.

== Biography ==
=== Career ===
Born in Johannesburg, Ryan began touring in the 1960s. Ryan notably pushed Arthur Ashe to five sets when they met in second round of 1969 Wimbledon Championships. He won the first two sets, before the fifth seeded American came back to win and ultimately make the semi-finals. In 1971 he partnered with Željko Franulović to make the fourth round of the men's doubles at the French Open, then teamed up with Jimmy Connors at that year's US Open and reached the third round. His best singles results on the Grand Prix circuit were quarter-final appearances at Eastbourne in 1971 and Newport, Wales in 1973.

=== Personal life ===
Ryan was the tournament director of the Dorado Beach WCT Tournament of Champions when it featured on the World Championship Tennis tour in 1979. He settled in Puerto Rico and worked as a head tennis coach at resorts in Dorado.
