= Hans-Joachim Plötz =

German tennis player

- Full name: Hans-Joachim Plötz
- Country (sports): West Germany
- Born: 26 February 1944 (age 81); Berlin, Germany

Singles
- Career record: 39–70
- Career titles: 0
- Highest ranking: No. 65 (8 April 1975)

Grand Slam singles results
- Australian Open: 2R (1973)
- French Open: 2R (1970, 1974, 1976)
- Wimbledon: 4R (1967)

Doubles
- Career record: 20–44
- Career titles: 0

Grand Slam doubles results
- Australian Open: 2R (1973)
- French Open: 4R (1969, 1970)
- Wimbledon: 2R (1970, 1973, 1974)

Hans-Joachim "Hajo" Plötz (born 26 February 1944) is a former professional tennis player from Germany.

== Biography ==
Plötz, known as "Hajo", competed on the professional tennis circuit in the late 1960s and 1970s. He made the West German Davis Cup squad during his career but never featured in a tie.

He was one of only two Germans to make the fourth round of the 1967 Wimbledon Championships, with wins over John Pickens, Onny Parun and Giordano Maioli.

The following year he won the 1968 German National Singles Championships. His opponent in the final, Hans-Jürgen Pohmann, partnered with Plötz at the 1969 French Open, to reach the fourth round of the men's doubles. He also made the fourth round of the doubles at the 1970 French Open, this time with another countryman, Ingo Buding.

Plötz won the Stuttgart Open in 1974, with a win over France's Jacques Thamin in the final. He was a finalist at the 1974 German Open in Hamburg, a clay court tournament on the Grand Prix circuit. In the quarter-finals he came from two sets down to defeat Patrick Proisy then upset Guillermo Vilas in the semi-finals, also in five sets, before a straight sets loss in the final to American Eddie Dibbs.

In 1975 he started the year well by making the quarter-finals in Basel and semi-final in Cairo, for which he was rewarded in April with his highest ranking, 65 in the world. In the Canadian Open that year in Toronto he played as a qualifier and had a win over Björn Borg, en route to the quarter-finals.

He opened up a sports store in 1976, on Hohenzollerndamm in Berlin, a family business that is now run by his son.

== Grand Prix career finals ==
=== Singles: 1 (0–1) ===
Resul	W/L	Date	Tournament	Surface	Opponent	Score
Loss	0–1	May 1974	Hamburg, West Germany	Clay	(United States) Eddie Dibbs	2–6, 2–6, 3–6
