= Koji Watanabe =

Japanese tennis player (born 1942)

- Country (sports): Japan
- Born: 19 January 1942 (age 84) Ashiya, Hyogo, Japan
- Turned pro: 1961 (amateur tour)
- Retired: 1971

Singles
- Career record: 165-21 (88.7%)
- Career titles: 4

Grand Slam singles results
- Australian Open: 2R (1965), (1969)
- French Open: 2R (1964), (1966)
- Wimbledon: 2R (1969)

Koji Watanabe (渡邊康二, Watanabe Kōji; born 19 January 1942) is a Japanese former international tennis player. He won four career singles titles (1966–1969).

== Career ==
Watanabe played his first tournament at the Miami Invitational in 1961. He won his first title on clay at Gruneweld, West Germany in August 1966 beating compatriot Ichizo Konishi in three sets. In 1966 he claimed his second title again on clay at Ostend, Belgium defeating South African player Jackie Saul two sets to one. His third title came in 1968 at the Lowther Hard Court Championships, Barnes, London where he beat New Zealand player Onny Parun two sets to one. His fourth and final tile came in 1969 at the Athens International on clay where he defeated Australian player Geoff Masters three sets to one. He reached the finals of three other tournaments Andhra Pradesh Championships on hard courts in (1966), the Worcestershire Championships, on grass in (1967) and finally Bad Neuenahar on clay in (1969).

In Grand Slam tournaments he competed in the Australian Open two times, in 1965 and 1969., The French Open in 1964 and 1966 and at Wimbledon one time in 1969. He also served as coach for Japan's Davis Cup team (1971–1974) and as vice-chairman of the Japan Tennis Association.

He played his last tournament at the Tokyo Indoor in 1971 losing to Ian Fletcher in the semifinals.
