= Byron Bertram =

South African tennis player

- Country (sports): Republic of South Africa
- Residence: Johannesburg, South Africa
- Born: 29 October 1952 (age 72); Johannesburg, South Africa
- Height: 1.83 m (6 ft 0 in)
- Turned pro: 1970
- Retired: 1980
- Plays: Right-handed (one-handed backhand)

Singles
- Career record: 101–127
- Career titles: 0
- Highest ranking: No. 51 (26 July 1976)

Grand Slam singles results
- French Open: 2R (1976, 1977)
- Wimbledon: QF (1977)
- US Open: 1R (1976, 1980)

Doubles
- Career record: 98–100
- Career titles: 1

Team competitions
- Davis Cup: W (1974)

Byron Bertram (born 29 October 1952) is a former professional tennis player from South Africa

Bertram attended Parktown Boys' High School. During his career, he won one tour doubles title and achieved a career-high singles ranking of world No. 51 in July 1976. Bertram reached the quarterfinals of the 1977 Wimbledon Championships and defeated Stan Smith at the tournament in 1975. He also was a member of the winning South Africa Davis Cup team in 1974.

== Career finals ==
=== Doubles (1 title, 3 runner-ups) ===
Result	W/L	Date	Tournament	Surface	Partner	Opponents	Score
Loss	0–1	Feb 1974	Salisbury, U.S.	Carpet	(Rhodesia) Andrew Pattison	(United States) Jimmy Connors (South Africa) Frew McMillan	6–3, 2–6, 1–6
Loss	0–2	Mar 1974	Jackson, U.S.	Carpet (i)	(United Kingdom) John Feaver	(United States) Fred McNair (United States) Raz Reid	6–3, 3–6, 3–6
Win	1–2	Aug 1976	Louisville, U.S.	Clay	(South Africa) Pat Cramer	(United States) Stan Smith (United States) Erik van Dillen	6–3, 6–4
Loss	1–3	Jan 1978	Sarasota, U.S.	Carpet	(South Africa) Bernard Mitton	(Switzerland) Colin Dowdeswell (Australia) Geoff Masters	6–2, 3–6, 2–6

=== Singles (1 runner-up) ===
Result	W/L	Date	Tournament	Surface	Opponent	Score
Loss	0–1	Mar 1974	Calgary, Canada	Indoor	(West Germany) Karl Meiler	4–6, 6–3, 3–6
