= Graham Stilwell =

British tennis player (1945–2019)

- Full name: Graham Rodney Stilwell
- Country (sports): United Kingdom
- Born: 15 November 1945 Denham, Buckinghamshire, England
- Died: 31 January 2019 (aged 73)
- Height: 5 ft 8 in (173 cm)
- Turned pro: 1968 (amateur from 1963)
- Retired: 1975
- Plays: Right-handed (one-handed backhand)

Singles
- Career record: 72–163
- Highest ranking: No. 62 (14 June 1976)

Grand Slam singles results
- Australian Open: 3R (1964, 1967)
- French Open: 3R (1971)
- Wimbledon: 4R (1975)
- US Open: 4R (1966)

Doubles
- Career record: 93–125 (Open Era)
- Career titles: 3

Grand Slam doubles results
- Australian Open: QF (1967, 1968)
- Wimbledon: SF (1966)
- US Open: F (1964)

Team competitions
- Davis Cup: F (1969)

Graham Stilwell (15 November 1945 – 31 January 2019) was a professional tennis player from the United Kingdom. He was born in Denham, Buckinghamshire, England.

Stilwell enjoyed most of his tennis success while playing doubles. During his career he won three doubles titles, two of which were in the Open Era.

== Personal life ==
Stilwell had three children (Tiffany, Alex and Lara) in his first marriage to Robin Lockard. His second marriage to Jill Jacobs resulted in two children (Sam and Romy).

He died of a neuro-muscular disorder on 31 January 2019.

== Grand Slam finals ==
=== Doubles (1 runner-up) ===
Result	Year	Championship	Surface	Partner	Opponents	Score
Loss	1964	U.S. Championships	Grass	(United Kingdom) Mike Sangster	(United States) Chuck McKinley (United States) Dennis Ralston	3–6, 2–6, 4–6

== Career finals ==
=== Doubles (2 titles, 4 runner-ups) ===
Result	W-L	Date	Tournament	Surface	Partner	Opponents	Score
Loss	0–1	Nov 1969	Stockholm Sweden	Carpet	(Spain) Andrés Gimeno	(Australia) Roy Emerson (Australia) Rod Laver	4–6, 2–6
Loss	0–2	Feb 1973	Copenhagen, Denmark	Carpet	(United Kingdom) Mark Cox	(United States) Tom Gorman (United States) Erik van Dillen	4–6, 4–6
Win	1–2	Feb 1973	Cologne, West Germany	Carpet	(United Kingdom) Mark Cox	(Netherlands) Tom Okker (United States) Marty Riessen	7–6, 6–3
Win	2–2	Aug 1973	Columbus, U.S.	Hard	(United Kingdom) Gerald Battrick	(Australia) Colin Dibley (United States) Charlie Pasarell	6–4, 7–6
Loss	2–3	Sep 1973	Chicago, U.S.	Carpet	(United Kingdom) Gerald Battrick	(Australia) Owen Davidson (Australia) John Newcombe	7–6, 6–7, 6–7
Loss	2–4	Nov 1973	London, UK	Carpet	(United Kingdom) Gerald Battrick	(United Kingdom) Mark Cox (Australia) Owen Davidson	4–6, 6–8
