= 1969 French Open – Mixed doubles =

Tennis tournament

Mixed doubles
- 1969 French Open

Final
- Champion: (United States) Marty Riessen (Australia) Margaret Court
- Runner-up: (France) Jean-Claude Barclay (France) Françoise Dürr
- Score: 6–3, 6–2

Details
- Draw: 62
- Seeds: 8

Events
Singles	men	women		boys	girls
Doubles	men	women	mixed	boys	girls
WC Singles	men	women	quad
WC Doubles	men	women	quad
Legends	−45	45+	women
- French Open

Jean-Claude Barclay and Françoise Dürr were the defending champions but lost in the final 6–3, 6–2 against Marty Riessen and Margaret Court.

== Seeds ==
1. (Australia) John Newcombe / (United States) Billie Jean King (semifinals)
2. (Netherlands) Tom Okker / (United Kingdom) Virginia Wade (semifinals)
3. (France) Jean-Claude Barclay / (France) Françoise Dürr (final)
4. (United States) Marty Riessen / (Australia) Margaret Court (champions)
5. (Australia) Tony Roche / (United States) Rosie Casals (third round)
6. (Soviet Union) Alex Metreveli / (Soviet Union) Olga Morozova (third round)
7. (Romania) Ion Țiriac / (United Kingdom) Ann Jones (third round)
8. (United States) Cliff Richey / (United States) Nancy Richey (quarterfinals)

== Draw ==
Key

- Q = Qualifier
- WC = Wild card
- LL = Lucky loser
- Alt = Alternate
- ITF = ITF entry
- PR = Protected ranking
- SR = Special ranking
- SE = Special exempt
- JE = Junior exempt
- JR = Junior Accelerator Programme entrant
- CO = College Accelerator Programme entrant
- NG = Next Gen Accelerator Program entrant
- w/o = Walkover
- r = Retired
- d = Defaulted

=== Finals ===
Quarterfinals
2	(Netherlands) Tom Okker (United Kingdom) Virginia Wade	9	0	7
(South Africa) Frew McMillan (South Africa) Patricia Walkden	7	6	5
3	(France) Jean-Claude Barclay (France) Françoise Dürr	7	6
(Australia) Bill Bowrey (Australia) Lesley Bowrey	5	3
(Romania) Ilie Năstase (Australia) Kerry Melville	6	4	2
4	(United States) Marty Riessen (Australia) Margaret Court	3	6	6
8	(United States) Cliff Richey (United States) Nancy Richey	2	6	5
1	(Australia) John Newcombe (United States) Billie Jean King	6	4	7

Semifinals
2	(Netherlands) Tom Okker (United Kingdom) Virginia Wade	3	6
3	(France) Jean-Claude Barclay (France) Françoise Dürr	6	8
4	(United States) Marty Riessen (Australia) Margaret Court	7	6
1	(Australia) John Newcombe (United States) Billie Jean King	5	4

Final
3	(France) Jean-Claude Barclay (France) Françoise Dürr	3	2
4	(United States) Marty Riessen (Australia) Margaret Court	6	6

=== Top half ===
==== Section 1 ====
First round
(United States) Z Guerry (United States) L Tuero	4	6	4
(France) F Pierson (France) I Fraisse	6	3	6
(United States) D Dell (France) G Chanfreau	6	6
(France) F Battegay (France) A Nenot	2	2
(France) B Paul (France) É Terras	4	1
(West Germany) H-J Plötz (West Germany) K Ebbinghaus	6	6
7	(Romania) I Țiriac (United Kingdom) A Jones	w/o
(New Zealand) J McDonald (South Africa) H Segal
(West Germany) H-J Pohmann (West Germany) K Seelbach
(Italy) L Pirro (France) D Burel	w/o
(South Africa) F McMillan (South Africa) P Walkden	w/o
(Republic of Ireland) M Hickey (France) J Le Boubenec
(Greece) N Kalogeropoulos (Greece) C-A Kalogeropoulos	10	6
(Bolivia) E Gorostiaga (Argentina) A Cavadini	8	2

Second round
2	(Netherlands) T Okker (United Kingdom) V Wade	6	6
(France) F Pierson (France) I Fraisse	0	1
(United States) D Dell (France) G Chanfreau	6	6
(West Germany) H-J Plötz (West Germany) K Ebbinghaus	3	4
7	(Romania) I Țiriac (United Kingdom) A Jones	6	6
(Italy) L Pirro (France) D Burel	0	1
(South Africa) F McMillan (South Africa) P Walkden	6	6
(Greece) N Kalogeropoulos (Greece) C-A Kalogeropoulos	0	4

Third round
2	(Netherlands) T Okker (United Kingdom) V Wade	6	6
(United States) D Dell (France) G Chanfreau	3	3
7	(Romania) I Țiriac (United Kingdom) A Jones	4	6	3
(South Africa) F McMillan (South Africa) P Walkden	6	2	6

Quarterfinals
2	(Netherlands) T Okker (United Kingdom) V Wade	9	0	7
(South Africa) F McMillan (South Africa) P Walkden	7	6	5

==== Section 2 ====
First round
3	(France) J-C Barclay (France) F Dürr	6	6
(Romania) S Dron (Romania) J Dibar	2	0
(Japan) K Watanabe (Japan) K Sawamatsu	6	4	1
(Soviet Union) A Ivanov (Hungary) E Polgár	2	6	6
(Egypt) I El Shafei (Sweden) E Lundquist	6	4	6
(Argentina) R Peralta (Australia) H Gourlay	4	6	2
(France) P Joly (Australia) C Sherriff	1	4
(Soviet Union) T Leius (Soviet Union) T Kivi	6	6
6	(Soviet Union) A Metreveli (Soviet Union) O Morozova	w/o
(Australia) B Phillips-Moore (Australia) A Phillips-Moore
(Chile) P Rodríguez (France) C Spinoza	1	2
(Socialist Federal Republic of Yugoslavia) Ž Franulović (Australia) M Starr	6	6
(Australia) B Bowrey (Australia) L Bowrey	6	6
(Poland) M Rybarczyk (Poland) D Wieczorek	3	3
(Australia) A Hammond (Australia) J Young	3	1
(Australia) D Crealy (Australia) F Moore	6	6

Second round
3	(France) J-C Barclay (France) F Dürr	6	6
(Soviet Union) A Ivanov (Hungary) E Polgár	2	2
(Egypt) I El Shafei (Sweden) E Lundquist	2	6	5
(Soviet Union) T Leius (Soviet Union) T Kivi	6	1	7
6	(Soviet Union) A Metreveli (Soviet Union) O Morozova	2	6	6
(Socialist Federal Republic of Yugoslavia) Ž Franulović (Australia) M Starr	6	3	2
(Australia) B Bowrey (Australia) L Bowrey	7	6
(Australia) D Crealy (Australia) F Moore	5	2

Third round
3	(France) J-C Barclay (France) F Dürr	6	6
(Soviet Union) T Leius (Soviet Union) T Kivi	3	0
6	(Soviet Union) A Metreveli (Soviet Union) O Morozova	4	6	6
(Australia) B Bowrey (Australia) L Bowrey	6	4	8

Quarterfinals
3	(France) J-C Barclay (France) F Dürr	7	6
(Australia) B Bowrey (Australia) L Bowrey	5	3

=== Bottom half ===
==== Section 3 ====
First round
(Japan) J Kawamori (Japan) J Sawamatsu	9	0
(France) G Goven (Netherlands) J Salomé	11	6
(France) W N'Godrella (France) A-M Rouchon	3	3
(Romania) I Năstase (Australia) K Melville	6	6
(France) A Bresson (France) J Kermina	2	3
(Soviet Union) V Palman (Soviet Union) Z Jansone	6	6
(France) JL Auget (Argentina) AM Arias
5	(Australia) T Roche (United States) R Casals	w/o
(France) B Montrenaud (South Africa) L Rossouw	w/o
(United States) M Estep (United States) V Ziegenfuss
(France) D Moreau (Ecuador) ME Guzmán	1	2
(Australia) R Ruffels (Australia) K Krantzcke	6	6
(Belgium) C Janssens (Belgium) M Van Haver
(Colombia) J Velasco (France) O de Roubin	w/o
(Sweden) H Nerell (Sweden) M Strandberg
4	(United States) M Riessen (Australia) M Court	w/o

Second round
(France) G Goven (Netherlands) J Salomé	4	5
(Romania) I Năstase (Australia) K Melville	6	7
(Soviet Union) V Palman (Soviet Union) Z Jansone	4	2
5	(Australia) T Roche (United States) R Casals	6	6
(France) B Montrenaud (South Africa) L Rossouw	2	3
(Australia) R Ruffels (Australia) K Krantzcke	6	6
(Colombia) J Velasco (France) O de Roubin	1	1
4	(United States) M Riessen (Australia) M Court	6	6

Third round
(Romania) I Năstase (Australia) K Melville	6	6
5	(Australia) T Roche (United States) R Casals	3	4
(Australia) R Ruffels (Australia) K Krantzcke	5	2
4	(United States) M Riessen (Australia) M Court	7	6

Quarterfinals
(Romania) I Năstase (Australia) K Melville	6	4	2
4	(United States) M Riessen (Australia) M Court	3	6	6

==== Section 4 ====
First round
(France) G Deniau (France) F De La Courtie-Billat	4	6	6
(Spain) A Muñoz (Argentina) R Giscafré	6	2	3
(Poland) W Gąsiorek (United States) D Knode
(United States) A Olmedo (United States) J Heldman	w/o
(Japan) K Yanagi (Japan) K Hatanaka
(France) P Darmon (France) R Darmon	w/o
(Guadeloupe) M Fremiot (France) N Cazaux	2	3
8	(United States) C Richey (United States) N Richey	6	6
(Italy) G Di Maso (Italy) M Di Maso	w/o
(South Africa) T Ryan (South Africa) W Tomlinson
(France) F Matheu (France) C Rouire
(Australia) B Carmichael (Australia) L Hunt	w/o
(Australia) A Gardiner (Argentina) G Moran
(Colombia) I Molina (South Africa) J Lieffrig	w/o

Second round
(France) G Deniau (France) F De La Courtie-Billat	3	3
(United States) A Olmedo (United States) J Heldman	6	6
(France) P Darmon (France) R Darmon	5	3
8	(United States) C Richey (United States) N Richey	7	6
(Italy) G Di Maso (Italy) M Di Maso	0	0
(Australia) B Carmichael (Australia) L Hunt	6	6
(Colombia) I Molina (South Africa) J Lieffrig	0	3
1	(Australia) J Newcombe (United States) BJ King	6	6

Third round
(United States) A Olmedo (United States) J Heldman	7	1	3
8	(United States) C Richey (United States) N Richey	5	6	6
(Australia) B Carmichael (Australia) L Hunt	2	6	3
1	(Australia) J Newcombe (United States) BJ King	6	3	6

Quarterfinals
8	(United States) C Richey (United States) N Richey	2	6	5
1	(Australia) J Newcombe (United States) BJ King	6	4	7
