= 1969 in tennis =

This page covers all the important events in the sport of tennis in 1969. It provides the results of notable tournaments throughout the year on both the men's and the women's tennis circuits.

== Australian Open ==
Category	Champion(s)	Finalist(s)	Score
Men's singles	(Australia) Rod Laver	(Spain) Andrés Gimeno	6–3, 6–4, 7–5
Women's singles	(Australia) Margaret Court	(United States) Billie Jean King	6–4, 6–1
Men's doubles	(Australia) Rod Laver (Australia) Roy Emerson	(Australia) Ken Rosewall (Australia) Fred Stolle	6–4, 6–4
Women's doubles	(Australia) Margaret Court (Australia) Judy Tegart-Dalton	(United States) Rosemary Casals (United States) Billie Jean King	6–4, 6–4
Mixed doubles	(Australia) Margaret Court and (United Kingdom) Ann Haydon-Jones (United States) Marty Riessen and (Australia) Fred Stolle		(Shared title – final not played)

== French Open ==
Category	Champion(s)	Finalist(s)	Score
Men's singles	(Australia) Rod Laver	(Australia) Ken Rosewall	6–4, 6–3, 6–4
Women's singles	(Australia) Margaret Court	(United Kingdom) Ann Haydon-Jones	6–1, 4–6, 6–3
Men's doubles	(Australia) John Newcombe (Australia) Tony Roche	(Australia) Roy Emerson (Australia) Rod Laver	4–6, 6–1, 3–6, 6–4, 6–4
Women's doubles	(France) Françoise Dürr (United Kingdom) Ann Haydon-Jones	(Australia) Margaret Court (United States) Nancy Richey	6–0, 4–6, 7–5
Mixed doubles	(Australia) Margaret Court (United States) Marty Riessen	(France) Françoise Dürr (France) Jean-Claude Barclay	6–3, 6–2

== Wimbledon ==
Category	Champion(s)	Finalist(s)	Score
Men's singles	(Australia) Rod Laver	(Australia) John Newcombe	6–4, 5–7, 6–4, 6–4
Women's singles	(United Kingdom) Ann Jones	(United States) Billie Jean King	3–6, 6–3, 6–2
Men's doubles	(Australia) John Newcombe (Australia) Tony Roche	(Netherlands) Tom Okker (United States) Marty Riessen	7–5, 11–9, 6–3
Women's doubles	(Australia) Margaret Court (Australia) Judy Tegart	(United States) Patti Hogan (United States) Peggy Michel	9–7, 6–2
Mixed doubles	(Australia) Fred Stolle (United Kingdom) Ann Jones	(Australia) Tony Roche (Australia) Judy Tegart	6–2, 6–3

== US Open ==
Category	Champion(s)	Finalist(s)	Score
Men's singles	(Australia) Rod Laver	(Australia) Tony Roche	7–9, 6–1, 6–2, 6–2 (Note: It was Laver's 11th and last career Grand Slam singles title and his 2nd at the US Open.)
Women's singles	(Australia) Margaret Court	(United States) Nancy Richey	6–2, 6–2 (Note: It was Court's 16th career Grand Slam singles title and her 3rd at the US Open.)
Men's doubles	(Australia) Ken Rosewall (Australia) Fred Stolle	(United States) Charlie Pasarell (United States) Dennis Ralston	2–6, 7–5, 13–11, 6–3 (Note: It was Rosewall's 8th career Grand Slam doubles title and his 2nd and last at the US Open.) (Note: It was Stolle's 10th career Grand Slam doubles title and his 3rd at the US Open.)
Women's doubles	(France) Françoise Dürr (United States) Darlene Hard	(Australia) Margaret Court (United Kingdom) Virginia Wade	0–6, 6–3, 6–4 (Note: It was Dürr's 4th career Grand Slam doubles title and her 1st at the US Open.) (Note: It was Hard's 13th and last career Grand Slam doubles title and her 6th at the US Open.)
Mixed doubles	(Australia) Margaret Court (United States) Marty Riessen	(France) Françoise Dürr (United States) Dennis Ralston	7–5, 6–3 (Note: It was Court's 18th career Grand Slam mixed doubles title and her 6th at the US Open.) (Note: It was Riessen's 3rd career Grand Slam mixed doubles title and his 1st at the US Open.)
