= 1970 French Open – Mixed doubles =

Mixed doubles
- 1970 French Open

Final
- Champion: (South Africa) Bob Hewitt (United States) Billie Jean King
- Runner-up: (France) Jean-Claude Barclay (France) Françoise Dürr
- Score: 3–6, 6–4, 6–2

Details
- Draw: 53
- Seeds: 8

Events
| Singles | men | women | | boys | girls |
| Doubles | men | women | mixed | boys | girls |
| WC Singles | men | women | quad |
| WC Doubles | men | women | quad |
| Legends | −45 | 45+ | women |
- French Open

Marty Riessen and Margaret Court were the defending champions, but Marty Riessen did not compete this year. Margaret Court teamed up with Željko Franulović and lost in semifinals to Bob Hewitt and Billie Jean King.

Bob Hewitt and Billie Jean King won in the final 3–6, 6–4, 6–2 against Jean-Claude Barclay and Françoise Dürr.

== Seeds ==
1. (South Africa) Bob Hewitt / (United States) Billie Jean King (champions)
2. (France) Jean-Claude Barclay / (France) Françoise Dürr (final)
3. (Romania) Ilie Năstase / (United States) Rosie Casals (semifinals)
4. (Socialist Federal Republic of Yugoslavia) Željko Franulović / (Australia) Margaret Court (semifinals)
5. (Soviet Union) Alex Metreveli / (Soviet Union) Olga Morozova (quarterfinals)
6. (Romania) Ion Țiriac / (United Kingdom) Virginia Wade (quarterfinals)
7. (Australia) Ray Ruffels / (Australia) Karen Krantzcke (third round)
8. (United States) Jim McManus / (Australia) Judy Dalton (quarterfinals)

== Draw ==
Key

- Q = Qualifier
- WC = Wild card
- LL = Lucky loser
- Alt = Alternate
- ITF = ITF entry
- PR = Protected ranking
- SR = Special ranking
- SE = Special exempt
- JE = Junior exempt
- JR = Junior Accelerator Programme entrant
- CO = College Accelerator Programme entrant
- NG = Next Gen Accelerator Program entrant
- w/o = Walkover
- r = Retired
- d = Defaulted

=== Finals ===
Quarterfinals
2 | (France) Jean-Claude Barclay (France) Françoise Dürr | 7 | 4 | 6
(Australia) Bob Carmichael (France) Gail Chanfreau | 5 | 6 | 3
3 | (Romania) Ilie Năstase (United States) Rosie Casals | 6 | 6
6 | (Romania) Ion Țiriac (United Kingdom) Virginia Wade | 1 | 3
5 | (Soviet Union) Alex Metreveli (Soviet Union) Olga Morozova | 4 | 9 | 7
4 | (Socialist Federal Republic of Yugoslavia) Željko Franulović (Australia) Margaret Court | 6 | 7 | 9
8 | (United States) Jim McManus (Australia) Judy Dalton | 3 | 4
1 | (South Africa) Bob Hewitt (United States) Billie Jean King | 6 | 6

Semifinals
2 | (France) Jean-Claude Barclay (France) Françoise Dürr | 6 | 6
3 | (Romania) Ilie Năstase (United States) Rosie Casals | 4 | 4
4 | (Socialist Federal Republic of Yugoslavia) Željko Franulović (Australia) Margaret Court | 4 | 6
1 | (South Africa) Bob Hewitt (United States) Billie Jean King | 6 | 8

Final
2 | (France) Jean-Claude Barclay (France) Françoise Dürr | 6 | 4 | 2
1 | (South Africa) Bob Hewitt (United States) Billie Jean King | 3 | 6 | 6

=== Top half ===
==== Section 1 ====
First round
(Brazil) JE Mandarino (Spain) C Mandarino | 1 | 1
(Romania) P Mărmureanu (South Africa) J Lieffrig | 6 | 6
(Australia) B Carmichael (France) G Chanfreau | 6 | 6
(Japan) J Kuki (Japan) J Sawamatsu | 3 | 4
(South Africa) L Sylvester (South Africa) B Kirk
(Hungary) S Baranyi (Hungary) J Szörényi | w/o

Second round
2 | (France) J-C Barclay (France) F Dürr | 6 | 6
(Ecuador) E Zuleta (Sweden) M Pegel | 1 | 0
(Australia) G Masters (Australia) L Crooke | 6 | 6 | 6
(Hungary) G Varga (France) N Cazaux | 4 | 8 | 2
7 | (Australia) R Ruffels (Australia) K Krantzcke | 6 | 6
(Romania) P Mărmureanu (South Africa) J Lieffrig | 0 | 0
(Australia) B Carmichael (France) G Chanfreau | 6 | 6
(Hungary) S Baranyi (Hungary) J Szörényi | 0 | 4

Third round
2 | (France) J-C Barclay (France) F Dürr | 6 | 6
(Australia) G Masters (Australia) L Crooke | 0 | 1
7 | (Australia) R Ruffels (Australia) K Krantzcke | 4 | 3
(Australia) B Carmichael (France) G Chanfreau | 6 | 6

Quarterfinals
2 | (France) J-C Barclay (France) F Dürr | 7 | 4 | 6
(Australia) B Carmichael (France) G Chanfreau | 5 | 6 | 3

==== Section 2 ====
First round
3 | (Romania) I Năstase (United States) R Casals | w/o
(Australia) J Gilchrist (Australia) W Gilchrist
(Bolivia) E Gorostiaga (Brazil) S Petersen | w/o
(United States) John Bryant (South Africa) L Rossouw
(Australia) R Keldie (Australia) K Harris | w/o
(United States) C Steele (France) J Berson
(Hungary) I Gulyás (Hungary) K Borka | 6 | 1 | 6
(France) F Matheu (France) C Rouire | 4 | 6 | 3
6 | (Romania) I Țiriac (United Kingdom) V Wade | w/o
(United States) J Osborne (United States) K Osborne
(Chile) J Fillol (Uruguay) F Bonicelli | w/o
(France) J-B Chanfreau (South Africa) M Brummer
(Australia) J Alexander (Australia) L Hunt | w/o
(West Germany) I Buding (West Germany) E Buding
(France) B Paul (France) É Terras | 2 | 6 | 4
(Poland) T Nowicki (Sweden) C Sandberg | 6 | 3 | 6

Second round
3 | (Romania) I Năstase (United States) R Casals | 6 | 6
(Bolivia) E Gorostiaga (Brazil) S Petersen | 1 | 4
(Australia) R Keldie (Australia) K Harris | 7 | 4 | 4
(Hungary) I Gulyás (Hungary) K Borka | 5 | 6 | 6
6 | (Romania) I Țiriac (United Kingdom) V Wade | 6 | 6
(Chile) J Fillol (Uruguay) F Bonicelli | 4 | 4
(Australia) J Alexander (Australia) L Hunt | 5 | 7 | 5
(Poland) T Nowicki (Sweden) C Sandberg | 7 | 5 | 7

Third round
3 | (Romania) I Năstase (United States) R Casals | w/o
(Hungary) I Gulyás (Hungary) K Borka
6 | (Romania) I Țiriac (United Kingdom) V Wade | 6 | 13
(Poland) T Nowicki (Sweden) C Sandberg | 4 | 11

Quarterfinals
3 | (Romania) I Năstase (United States) R Casals | 6 | 6
6 | (Romania) I Țiriac (United Kingdom) V Wade | 1 | 3

=== Bottom half ===
==== Section 3 ====
First round
(France) P Joly (Sweden) E Lundquist
(Chile) P Cornejo (Chile) M Rodríguez | w/o
(France) F Battegay (France) C Spinoza | 5 | 3
(Australia) B Howe (South Africa) P Walkden | 7 | 6
(Hungary) P Szőke (Hungary) E Polgar | 3 | 6 | 6
(France) P Darmon (France) R Darmon | 6 | 4 | 3
(France) A Bouteleux (West Germany) E Winkens | 5 | 5
5 | (Soviet Union) A Metreveli (Soviet Union) O Morozova | 7 | 7
(France) G Deniau (France) F De La Courtie-Billat | w/o
(Australia) C Dibley (Australia) H Gourlay
(Soviet Union) T Kakulia (France) A-M Rouchon | 6 | 6
(South Africa) T Ryan (Netherlands) J Salomé | 4 | 3
(France) W N'Godrella (United States) K Harter | w/o
(South Africa) D Schroder (South Africa) W Tomlinson
(Poland) M Rybarczyk (Socialist Federal Republic of Yugoslavia) I Škulj | 0 | 3
4 | (Socialist Federal Republic of Yugoslavia) Ž Franulović (Australia) M Court | 6 | 6

Second round
(Chile) P Cornejo (Chile) M Rodríguez | w/o
(Australia) B Howe (South Africa) P Walkden
(Hungary) P Szőke (Hungary) E Polgar | 6 | 2 | 0
5 | (Soviet Union) A Metreveli (Soviet Union) O Morozova | 3 | 6 | 6
(France) G Deniau (France) F De La Courtie-Billat | 6 | 3 | 6
(Soviet Union) T Kakulia (France) A-M Rouchon | 3 | 6 | 4
(France) W N'Godrella (United States) K Harter | 1 | 3
4 | (Socialist Federal Republic of Yugoslavia) Ž Franulović (Australia) M Court | 6 | 6

Third round
(Chile) P Cornejo (Chile) M Rodríguez | 6 | 4
5 | (Soviet Union) A Metreveli (Soviet Union) O Morozova | 8 | 6
(France) G Deniau (France) F De La Courtie-Billat | 0 | 2
4 | (Socialist Federal Republic of Yugoslavia) Ž Franulović (Australia) M Court | 6 | 6

Quarterfinals
5 | (Soviet Union) A Metreveli (Soviet Union) O Morozova | 4 | 9 | 7
4 | (Socialist Federal Republic of Yugoslavia) Ž Franulović (Australia) M Court | 6 | 7 | 9

==== Section 4 ====
First round
(United States) F Ponte (France) N Niox-Château | 1 | 2
(Soviet Union) S Likhachev (Soviet Union) T Parmas | 6 | 6
(Soviet Union) A Volkov (France) D Bouteleux | 3 | 2
(Australia) T Addison (Australia) F Moore | 6 | 6

Second round
(Soviet Union) S Likhachev (Soviet Union) T Parmas | 6 | 2 | 3
(Australia) T Addison (Australia) F Moore | 2 | 6 | 6
(France) B Montrenaud (France) O de Roubin | 4 | 3
8 | (United States) J McManus (Australia) J Dalton | 6 | 6
(Japan) K Watanabe (Japan) K Sawamatsu | 6 | 6
(Chile) JR Pinto Bravo (Argentina) AM Arias | 1 | 2
(Hungary) R Machán (Hungary) É Szabó | 2 | 2
1 | (South Africa) B Hewitt (United States) BJ King | 6 | 6

Third round
(Australia) T Addison (Australia) F Moore | 6 | 1 | 2
8 | (United States) J McManus (Australia) J Dalton | 3 | 6 | 6
(Japan) K Watanabe (Japan) K Sawamatsu | 1 | 0
1 | (South Africa) B Hewitt (United States) BJ King | 6 | 6

Quarterfinals
8 | (United States) J McManus (Australia) J Dalton | 3 | 4
1 | (South Africa) B Hewitt (United States) BJ King | 6 | 6
