= 1969 Federation Cup (tennis) =

International women's tennis competition

Details
- Duration: 19 – 25 May
- Edition: 7th

Champion
- Winning nation: United States

The 1969 Federation Cup was the seventh edition of what is now known as the Fed Cup. 20 nations participated in the tournament, which was held at the Athens Tennis Club in Athens, Greece from 19 to 25 May. United States defeated Australia in the final, in what was the fourth final featuring both teams.

== Participating teams ==
Participating Teams
Australia	Belgium	Brazil	Bulgaria	Canada
Czechoslovakia	France	Great Britain	Greece	Hungary
Indonesia	Italy	Mexico	Netherlands	Poland
South Africa	Switzerland	United States	West Germany	Yugoslavia

== Draw ==
All ties were played at the Athens Tennis Club in Athens, Greece on clay courts. |}

First Round; 19 May
Indonesia	3
Greece	0
Bulgaria	0
Netherlands	3
West Germany
Brazil	w/o
Hungary	0
Canada	3

Second Round; 21–22 May
United States	3
Yugoslavia	0
Mexico	0
Italy	3
Switzerland	0
Czechoslovakia	3
Indonesia	0
Netherlands	3
West Germany	3
Canada	0
Belgium	0
Great Britain	3
South Africa	1
France	2
Poland	w/o
Australia

Quarterfinals; 23 May
United States	3
Italy	0
Czechoslovakia	1
Netherlands	2
West Germany	1
Great Britain	2
France	0
Australia	3

Semifinals; 24 May
United States	3
Netherlands	0
Great Britain	0
Australia	3

Final; 25 May
United States	2
Australia	1

=== First round ===
Indonesia vs. Greece

Indonesia
3
Athens Tennis Club, Athens, Greece
19 May 1969
Clay

Greece
0

			1	2	3
1	(Indonesia) (Greece)	Lany Kaligis; Xantippe Vassiliadou	6; 3	6; 3
2	(Indonesia) (Greece)	Lita Liem; Carol-Ann Kalgeropoulos	6; 0	6; 3
3	(Indonesia) (Greece)	Lany Kaligis / Lita Liem; Dionissia Asteri / Carol-Ann Kalgeropoulos	7; 5	6; 3

Bulgaria vs. Netherlands

Bulgaria
0
Athens Tennis Club, Athens, Greece
19 May 1969
Clay

Netherlands
3

			1	2	3
1	(Bulgaria) (Netherlands)	Lubka Radkova; Betty Stöve	2; 6	1; 6
2	(Bulgaria) (Netherlands)	Maria Chakarova; Marijke Schaar	2; 6	1; 6
3	(Bulgaria) (Netherlands)	Maria Chakarova / Lubka Radkova; Ada Bakker / Betty Stöve	2; 6	0; 6

Hungary vs. Canada

Hungary
0
Athens Tennis Club, Athens, Greece
19 May 1969
Clay

Canada
3

			1	2	3
1	(Hungary) (Canada)	Katalin Borka; Andrée Martin	6; 3	5; 7	9; 11
2	(Hungary) (Canada)	Erzsébet Polgár; Faye Urban	6; 1	6; 8	2; 6
3	(Hungary) (Canada)	Katalin Borka / Éva Szabó; Jane O'Hara / Faye Urban	1; 6	8; 10

=== Second round ===
United States vs. Yugoslavia

United States
3
Athens Tennis Club, Athens, Greece
21 May 1969
Clay

Yugoslavia
0

			1	2	3
1	(United States) (Socialist Federal Republic of Yugoslavia)	Nancy Richey; Biljana Kostić	6; 0	6; 0
2	(United States) (Socialist Federal Republic of Yugoslavia)	Julie Heldman; Irena Škulj	6; 0	6; 3
3	(United States) (Socialist Federal Republic of Yugoslavia)	Peaches Bartkowicz / Nancy Richey; Lena Dvornik / Irena Škulj	6; 1	6; 0

Mexico vs. Italy

Mexico
0
Athens Tennis Club, Athens, Greece
21 May 1969
Clay

Italy
3

			1	2	3
1	(Mexico) (Italy)	Elena Subirats; Maria Teresa Riedl	6; 4	2; 6	1; 6
2	(Mexico) (Italy)	Patricia Montaño; Lea Pericoli	0; 6	0; 6
3	(Mexico) (Italy)	Lucia Gongora / Elena Subirats; Lucia Bassi / Lea Pericoli	2; 6	3; 6

Czechoslovakia vs. Switzerland

Switzerland
0
Athens Tennis Club, Athens, Greece
21 May 1969
Clay

Czechoslovakia
3

			1	2	3
1	(Switzerland) (Czechoslovakia)	Marianne Kindler; Alena Palmeová	3; 6	0; 6
2	(Switzerland) (Czechoslovakia)	Anne-Marie Studer; Vlasta Vopičková	0; 6	7; 5	2; 6
3	(Switzerland) (Czechoslovakia)	Marianne Kindler / Anne-Marie Studer; Alena Palmeová / Vlasta Vopičková	2; 6	7; 9

Indonesia vs. Netherlands

Indonesia
0
Athens Tennis Club, Athens, Greece
21 May 1969
Clay

Netherlands
3

			1	2	3
1	(Indonesia) (Netherlands)	Lita Liem; Marijke Schaar	6; 2	3; 6	3; 6
2	(Indonesia) (Netherlands)	Lany Kaligis; Betty Stöve	2; 6	3; 6
3	(Indonesia) (Netherlands)	Lany Kaligis / Lita Liem; Marijke Schaar / Betty Stöve	6; 4	1; 6	1; 6

West Germany vs. Canada

West Germany
3
Athens Tennis Club, Athens, Greece
22 May 1969
Clay

Canada
0

			1	2	3
1	(West Germany) (Canada)	Almut Sturm; Andrée Martin	6; 2	6; 2
2	(West Germany) (Canada)	Helga Niessen; Faye Urban	6; 4	6; 1
3	(West Germany) (Canada)	Helga Niessen / Heide Schildknecht; Jane O'Hara / Faye Urban	6; 3	6; 2

Belgium vs. Great Britain

Belgium
0
Athens Tennis Club, Athens, Greece
22 May 1969
Clay

Great Britain
3

			1	2	3
1	(Belgium) (United Kingdom)	Michele Kahn; Winnie Shaw	1; 6	0; 6
2	(Belgium) (United Kingdom)	Ingrid Palmieri; Virginia Wade	2; 6	2; 6
3	(Belgium) (United Kingdom)	Christiane Mercelis / Ingrid Palmieri; Virginia Wade / Joyce Williams	4; 6	0; 6

France vs. South Africa

South Africa
1
Athens Tennis Club, Athens, Greece
22 May 1969
Clay

France
2

			1	2	3
1	(South Africa) (France)	Brenda Kirk; Gail Chanfreau	6; 4	2; 6	1; 6
2	(South Africa) (France)	Maryna Proctor; Rosie Darmon	5; 7	7; 5	6; 1
3	(South Africa) (France)	Brenda Kirk / Maryna Proctor; Gail Chanfreau / Rosie Darmon	4; 6	2; 6

=== Quarterfinals ===
United States vs. Italy

United States
3
Athens Tennis Club, Athens, Greece
23 May 1969
Clay

Italy
0

			1	2	3
1	(United States) (Italy)	Nancy Richey; Maria Teresa Riedl	6; 0	6; 0
2	(United States) (Italy)	Julie Heldman; Lea Pericoli	6; 1	6; 2
3	(United States) (Italy)	Peaches Bartkowicz / Nancy Richey; Lucia Bassi / Lea Pericoli	4; 6	8; 6	6; 0

Czechoslovakia vs. Netherlands

Czechoslovakia
1
Athens Tennis Club, Athens, Greece
23 May 1969
Clay

Netherlands
2

			1	2	3
1	(Czechoslovakia) (Netherlands)	Alena Palmeová; Betty Stöve	4; 6	1; 6
2	(Czechoslovakia) (Netherlands)	Vlasta Vopičková; Marijke Schaar	6; 3	6; 3
3	(Czechoslovakia) (Netherlands)	Alena Palmeová / Vlasta Vopičková; Ada Bakker / Betty Stöve	6; 4	5; 7	4; 6

West Germany vs. Great Britain

West Germany
1
Athens Tennis Club, Athens, Greece
23 May 1969
Clay

Great Britain
2

			1	2	3
1	(West Germany) (United Kingdom)	Almut Sturm; Winnie Shaw	4; 6	1; 6
2	(West Germany) (United Kingdom)	Helga Niessen; Virginia Wade	6; 4	6; 2
3	(West Germany) (United Kingdom)	Helga Niessen / Heide Schildknecht; Winnie Shaw / Virginia Wade	5; 7	3; 6

France vs. Australia

France
0
Athens Tennis Club, Athens, Greece
23 May 1969
Clay

Australia
3

			1	2	3
1	(France) (Australia)	Gail Chanfreau; Kerry Melville	2; 6	6; 8
2	(France) (Australia)	Rosie Darmon; Margaret Court	1; 6	1; 6
3	(France) (Australia)	Gail Chanfreau / Rosie Darmon; Margaret Court / Judy Tegart	1; 6	2; 6

=== Semifinals ===
United States vs. Netherlands

United States
3
Athens Tennis Club, Athens, Greece
24 May 1969
Clay

Netherlands
0

			1	2	3
1	(United States) (Netherlands)	Nancy Richey; Betty Stöve	7; 5	6; 2
2	(United States) (Netherlands)	Julie Heldman; Marijke Schaar	2; 6	9; 7	6; 1
3	(United States) (Netherlands)	Peaches Bartkowicz / Nancy Richey; Ada Bakker / Betty Stöve	6; 2	4; 6	6; 3

Great Britain vs. Australia

Great Britain
0
Athens Tennis Club, Athens, Greece
24 May 1969
Clay

Australia
3

			1	2	3
1	(United Kingdom) (Australia)	Winnie Shaw; Kerry Melville	3; 6	2; 6
2	(United Kingdom) (Australia)	Virginia Wade; Margaret Court	3; 6	4; 6
3	(United Kingdom) (Australia)	Virginia Wade / Joyce Williams; Margaret Court / Judy Tegart	6; 4	2; 6	3; 6

=== Final ===
Australia vs. United States

United States
2
Athens Tennis Club, Athens, Greece
25 May 1969
Clay

Australia
1

			1	2	3
1	(United States) (Australia)	Julie Heldman; Margaret Court	1; 6	6; 8
2	(United States) (Australia)	Nancy Richey; Kerry Melville	6; 4	6; 3
3	(United States) (Australia)	Peaches Bartkowicz / Nancy Richey; Margaret Court / Judy Tegart	6; 4	6; 4

== Consolation rounds ==
=== Qualifying Draw ===
Consolation Qualifying Semifinals; 23 May
Belgium	2
Canada	1
Indonesia	1
South Africa	2

Consolation Qualifying Final; 24 May
Belgium	1
South Africa	2

==== Qualifying Semifinals ====
Belgium vs. Canada

Belgium
2
Athens Tennis Club, Athens, Greece
23 May 1969
Clay

Canada
1

			1	2	3
1	(Belgium) (Canada)	Ingrid Palmieri; Andrée Martin	6; 4	6; 4
2	(Belgium) (Canada)	Michele Kahn; Jane O'Hara	6; 4	6; 3
3	(Belgium) (Canada)	Michele Kahn / Christiane Mercelis; Andrée Martin / Jane O'Hara	2; 6	1; 6

South Africa vs. Indonesia

Indonesia
2
Athens Tennis Club, Athens, Greece
23 May 1969
Clay

South Africa
1

		1	2	3
1	(Indonesia) (South Africa)
2	(Indonesia) (South Africa)
3	(Indonesia) (South Africa)

==== Qualifying Final ====
Belgium vs. South Africa

Belgium
1
Athens Tennis Club, Athens, Greece
24 May 1969
Clay

South Africa
2

			1	2	3
1	(Belgium) (South Africa)	Michele Kahn; Brenda Kirk	4; 6	6; 8
2	(Belgium) (South Africa)	Ingrid Palmieri; Maryna Proctor	7; 9	0; 6
3	(Belgium) (South Africa)	Michele Kahn / Christiane Mercelis; Brenda Kirk / Wendy Tomlinson	6; 4	5; 7	6; 1

=== Final ===
South Africa vs. Mexico

South Africa
3
Athens Tennis Club, Athens, Greece
25 May 1969
Clay

Mexico
0

		1	2	3
1	(South Africa) (Mexico)
2	(South Africa) (Mexico)
3	(South Africa) (Mexico)
