= 1969 French Open – Women's doubles =

Women's doubles
- 1969 French Open

Final
- Champion: (France) Françoise Dürr (United Kingdom) Ann Jones
- Runner-up: (Australia) Margaret Court (United States) Nancy Richey
- Score: 6–0, 4–6, 7–5

Details
- Draw: 37
- Seeds: 8

Events
Singles	men	women		boys	girls
Doubles	men	women	mixed	boys	girls
WC Singles	men	women	quad
WC Doubles	men	women	quad
Legends	−45	45+	women
- French Open

The women's doubles tournament at the 1969 French Open was held from 26 May to 8 June 1969 on the outdoor clay courts at the Stade Roland Garros in Paris, France. The third-seeded team of Françoise Dürr and Ann Jones won the title, defeating the first-seeded pair of Margaret Court and Nancy Richey in the final in three sets.

== Seeds ==
1. (Australia) Margaret Court / (United States) Nancy Richey (final)
2. (United States) Rosie Casals / (United States) Billie Jean King (quarterfinal)
3. (France) Françoise Dürr / (United Kingdom) Ann Jones (champions)
4. (Australia) Karen Krantzcke / (Australia) Kerry Melville (semifinal)
5. (United States) Peaches Bartkowicz / (United States) Julie Heldman (quarterfinal)
6. (Australia) Lesley Bowrey / (United Kingdom) Virginia Wade (quarterfinal)
7. (France) Gail Chanfreau / (France) Rosie Darmon (semifinal)
8. (South Africa) Laura Rossouw / (South Africa) Pat Walkden (quarterfinal)

== Draw ==
Key

- Q = Qualifier
- WC = Wild card
- LL = Lucky loser
- Alt = Alternate
- ITF = ITF entry
- PR = Protected ranking
- SR = Special ranking
- SE = Special exempt
- JE = Junior exempt
- JR = Junior Accelerator Programme entrant
- CO = College Accelerator Programme entrant
- NG = Next Gen Accelerator Program entrant
- w/o = Walkover
- r = Retired
- d = Defaulted

=== Finals ===
Semifinals
7	(France) Gail Chanfreau (France) Rosie Darmon	1	3
3	(France) Françoise Dürr (United Kingdom) Ann Jones	6	6
4	(Australia) Karen Krantzcke (Australia) Kerry Melville	12	3
1	(Australia) Margaret Court (United States) Nancy Richey	14	6

Final
3	(France) Françoise Dürr (United Kingdom) Ann Jones	6	4	7
1	(Australia) Margaret Court (United States) Nancy Richey	0	6	5

=== Top half ===
==== Section 1 ====
First round

Second round
(Indonesia) Lany Kaligis (Indonesia) Lita Sugiarto	4	4
2	(United States) Rosie Casals (United States) Billie Jean King	6	6
(Italy) Monica Giorgi (Italy) Lea Pericoli
(Romania) Judith Dibar (Sweden) Eva Lundqvist	W	O
(Japan) Kimiyo Yagahara (Japan) Yaeko Matsuda	1	6
7	(France) Gail Chanfreau (France) Rosie Darmon	6	8
(United States) Kristy Pigeon (United States) Linda Tuero	6	9
(France) Irene Fraisse (Australia) Janet Young	1	7

Third round
2	(United States) Rosie Casals (United States) Billie Jean King	6	6
(Romania) Judith Dibar (Sweden) Eva Lundqvist	4	2
7	(France) Gail Chanfreau (France) Rosie Darmon	6	6
(United States) Kristy Pigeon (United States) Linda Tuero	2	2

Quarterfinals
2	(United States) Rosie Casals (United States) Billie Jean King	1	5
7	(France) Gail Chanfreau (France) Rosie Darmon	6	7

==== Section 2 ====
First round
(United States) Tory Ann Fretz (France) Christiane Spinoza	6	6
(Netherlands) Judith Salomé (Poland) Danuta Wieczorek	2	1
(Sweden) Christina Sandberg (Sweden) Margareta Strandberg	W	O
(France) Odile de Roubin (France) Johanne Venturino
(Japan) Junko Sawamatsu (Japan) Kazuko Sawamatsu	6	6
(France) F De La Courtie-Billat (United States) Dorothy Knode	2	1

Second round
(United States) Julie Anthony (United States) Marilyn Aschner
3	(France) Françoise Dürr (United Kingdom) Ann Jones	W	O
(Belgium) Ingrid Palmieri (Belgium) Monique Van Haver
(South Africa) Brenda Kirk (South Africa) Wendy Tomlinson	W	O
(United States) Tory Ann Fretz (France) Christiane Spinoza	5	2
6	(Australia) Lesley Bowrey (United Kingdom) Virginia Wade	7	6
(Sweden) Christina Sandberg (Sweden) Margareta Strandberg	3	4
(Japan) Junko Sawamatsu (Japan) Kazuko Sawamatsu	6	6

Third round
3	(France) Françoise Dürr (United Kingdom) Ann Jones	6	7
(South Africa) Brenda Kirk (South Africa) Wendy Tomlinson	1	5
6	(Australia) Lesley Bowrey (United Kingdom) Virginia Wade	6	5	6
(Japan) Junko Sawamatsu (Japan) Kazuko Sawamatsu	0	7	1

Quarterfinals
3	(France) Françoise Dürr (United Kingdom) Ann Jones	5	6	6
6	(Australia) Lesley Bowrey (United Kingdom) Virginia Wade	7	2	4

=== Bottom half ===
==== Section 3 ====
First round
(Australia) Fay Moore (Australia) Carol Sherriff	6	6
(Italy) Monique Di Maso (Soviet Union) Tiiu Kivi	2	0
(Soviet Union) Olga Morozova (Soviet Union) Zaiga Jansone	W	O
(France) Nicole Cazaux (France) A-M Rouchon

Second round
(Australia) Fay Moore (Australia) Carol Sherriff	5	6	6
(Soviet Union) Olga Morozova (Soviet Union) Zaiga Jansone	7	4	4
(France) Aline Nenot (Sweden) Ulla Sandulf
5	(United States) Peaches Bartkowicz (United States) Julie Heldman	W-O
(Argentina) Raquel Giscafré (Bolivia) Ana-Carola Guzmán	2	2
(Australia) Helen Cawley (Australia) Lesley Hunt	6	6
(West Germany) Katja Ebbinghaus (West Germany) Kerstin Seelbach	3	0
4	(Australia) Karen Krantzcke (Australia) Kerry Melville	6	6

Third round
(Australia) Fay Moore (Australia) Carol Sherriff	1	5
5	(United States) Peaches Bartkowicz (United States) Julie Heldman	6	7
(Australia) Helen Cawley (Australia) Lesley Hunt	2	6
4	(Australia) Karen Krantzcke (Australia) Kerry Melville	6	8

Quarterfinals
5	(United States) Peaches Bartkowicz (United States) Julie Heldman	2	6	3
4	(Australia) Karen Krantzcke (Australia) Kerry Melville	6	1	6

==== Section 4 ====
First round

Second round
(Greece) C-A Kalogeropoulos (Hungary) Erzsébet Polgár	2	1
(France) Janine Lieffrig (France) Évelyne Terras	6	6
(Argentina) Ana María Arias (Argentina) Ana Cavadini	1	3
8	(South Africa) Laura Rossouw (South Africa) Patricia Walkden	6	6
(Hungary) Marie Neumanová (Czech Republic) Vlasta Vopičková	6	5	3
(Argentina) Graciela Morán (Australia) Margaret Starr	3	7	6
(France) Dominique Burel (France) Claudine Rouire	0	0
1	(Australia) Margaret Court (United States) Nancy Richey	6	6

Third round
(France) Janine Lieffrig (France) Évelyne Terras	1	5
8	(South Africa) Laura Rossouw (South Africa) Patricia Walkden	6	7
(Argentina) Graciela Morán (Australia) Margaret Starr	2	0
1	(Australia) Margaret Court (United States) Nancy Richey	6	6

Quarterfinals
8	(South Africa) Laura Rossouw (South Africa) Patricia Walkden	3	0
1	(Australia) Margaret Court (United States) Nancy Richey	6	6
