= 1970 French Open – Women's singles =

Tennis tournament held in 1970

Women's singles
- 1970 French Open

Final
- Champion: (Australia) Margaret Court
- Runner-up: (West Germany) Helga Niessen
- Score: 6–2, 6–4

Details
- Draw: 64
- Seeds: 8

Events
Singles	men	women		boys	girls
Doubles	men	women	mixed	boys	girls
WC Singles	men	women	quad
WC Doubles	men	women	quad
Legends	−45	45+	women
- French Open

Defending champion Margaret Court defeated Helga Niessen in the final, 6–2, 6–4 to win the women's singles tennis title at the 1970 French Open. It was her fourth French singles title, 18th major singles title overall, and the second leg of an eventual Grand Slam (the first in women's singles in the Open Era).

== Seeds ==
1. (Australia) Margaret Court (champion)
2. (United States) Billie Jean King (quarterfinals)
3. (United Kingdom) Virginia Wade (quarterfinals)
4. (United States) Julie Heldman (semifinals)
5. (Australia) Kerry Melville (first Round, withdrew)
6. (France) Françoise Dürr (third round)
7. (West Germany) Helga Niessen (final)
8. (United States) Rosie Casals (quarterfinals)

== Draw ==
Key

- Q = Qualifier
- WC = Wild card
- LL = Lucky loser
- Alt = Alternate
- ITF = ITF entry
- PR = Protected ranking
- SR = Special ranking
- SE = Special exempt
- JE = Junior exempt
- JR = Junior Accelerator Programme entrant
- CO = College Accelerator Programme entrant
- NG = Next Gen Accelerator Program entrant
- w/o = Walkover
- r = Retired
- d = Defaulted

=== Finals ===
Quarterfinals
1	(Australia) Margaret Court	7	6
8	(United States) Rosemary Casals	5	2
4	(United States) Julie Heldman	6	6
(Czechoslovakia) Vlasta Vopičková	1	3
(Australia) Karen Krantzcke	6	1	6
3	(United Kingdom) Virginia Wade	2	6	3
7	(West Germany) Helga Niessen	2	8	6
2	(United States) Billie Jean King	6	6	1

Semifinals
1	(Australia) Margaret Court	6	6
4	(United States) Julie Heldman	0	2
(Australia) Karen Krantzcke	3	1
7	(West Germany) Helga Niessen	6	6

Final
1	(Australia) Margaret Court	6	6
7	(West Germany) Helga Niessen	2	4

=== Top half ===
==== Section 1 ====
First round
1	(Australia) M Court	6	6
(Netherlands) M Schaar	1	1
(Soviet Union) O Morozova	4	6	8
(Japan) K Sawamatsu	6	0	6
(South Africa) M Brummer	15	2	0
(Sweden) E Lundquist	13	6	6
(Italy) L Pericoli	6	5	4^{r}
(Australia) L Hunt	3	7	5
(United States) K Pigeon	6	6
Q	(West Germany) E Winkens	3	3
(Netherlands) B Stöve	4	4
(Hungary) J Szörényi	6	6
(Italy) E Giorgi
(South Africa) P Walkden	w/o
(Czechoslovakia) A Palmeová	2	0
8	(United States) R Casals	6	6

Second round
1	(Australia) M Court	3	8	6
(Soviet Union) O Morozova	6	6	1
(Sweden) E Lundquist	2	2
(Australia) L Hunt	6	6
(United States) K Pigeon	6	6
(Hungary) J Szörényi	3	2
(South Africa) P Walkden	4	2
8	(United States) R Casals	6	6

Third round
1	(Australia) M Court	6	6
(Australia) L Hunt	2	1
(United States) K Pigeon	2	1
8	(United States) R Casals	6	6

Quarterfinals
1	(Australia) M Court	7	6
8	(United States) R Casals	5	2

==== Section 2 ====
First round
4	(United States) J Heldman	7	6
Q	(South Africa) J Lieffrig	5	0
(Australia) F Moore	6	7	6
(Japan) K Hatanaka	1	9	3
(South Africa) E Emmanuel	3	6	6
(United States) K Harter	6	4	4
(Australia) K Harris	6	7
(South Africa) B Kirk	4	5
(South Africa) L Rossouw	6	6
(United States) M-A Curtis	3	3
(Czechoslovakia) V Vopičková	6	6
(Sweden) I Bentzer	4	2
(Czechoslovakia) M Neumannová	4	4
Q	(Argentina) AM Arias	6	6
Q	(United States) W Overton	w/o
5	(Australia) K Melville

Second round
4	(United States) J Heldman	6	6
(Australia) F Moore	1	0
(South Africa) E Emmanuel	6	3	6
(Australia) K Harris	4	6	4
(South Africa) L Rossouw	3	1
(Czechoslovakia) V Vopičková	6	6
Q	(Argentina) AM Arias	2	7	6
Q	(United States) W Overton	6	5	4

Third round
4	(United States) J Heldman	3	9	6
(South Africa) E Emmanuel	6	7	4
(Czechoslovakia) V Vopičková	6	6
Q	(Argentina) AM Arias	4	4

Quarterfinals
4	(United States) J Heldman	6	6
(Czechoslovakia) V Vopičková	1	3

=== Bottom half ===
==== Section 3 ====
First round
6	(France) F Dürr	6	6
(United States) P Bartkowicz	0	2
Q	(Netherlands) J Salomé	3	6	0
(France) C Spinoza	6	1	6
(Australia) J Dalton	6	6
(United States) C Martinez	3	1
(Australia) K Krantzcke	8	1	6
Q	(Uruguay) F Bonicelli	6	6	3
(Hungary) É Szabó	6	3	3
(West Germany) K Ebbinghaus	2	6	6
(Sweden) C Sandberg	0	8	6
(Australia) H Gourlay	6	6	3
(Hungary) K Borka	0	0
(West Germany) H Hösl	6	6
(Australia) L Crooke	4	1
3	(United Kingdom) V Wade	6	6

Second round
6	(France) F Dürr	6	6
(France) C Spinoza	2	1
(Australia) J Dalton	4	6	0
(Australia) K Krantzcke	6	4	6
(West Germany) K Ebbinghaus	3	2
(Sweden) C Sandberg	6	6
(West Germany) H Hösl	7	8
3	(United Kingdom) V Wade	9	10

Third round
6	(France) F Dürr	6	4
(Australia) K Krantzcke	8	6
(Sweden) C Sandberg	4	7	4
3	(United Kingdom) V Wade	6	5	6

Quarterfinals
(Australia) K Krantzcke	6	1	6
3	(United Kingdom) V Wade	2	6	3

==== Section 4 ====
First round
7	(West Germany) H Niessen	7	6
(United States) P Austin	5	0
(Soviet Union) T Parmas	9	6
(Socialist Federal Republic of Yugoslavia) I Skulj	7	3
(United States) D Carter	2	4
(Indonesia) L Liem	6	6
(France) G Chanfreau	6	10
(South Africa) W Tomlinson	3	8
(France) E Terras	2	9	6
Q	(United States) P Teeguarden	6	7	2
(Sweden) J Sandulf	3	0	r
(France) O de Roubin	6	3
(Hungary) E Polgár	2	5
(United Kingdom) J Cooper	6	7
Q	(Australia) H Amos	5	3
2	(United States) BJ King	7	6

Second round
7	(West Germany) H Niessen	7	10
(Soviet Union) T Parmas	5	8
(Indonesia) L Liem	2	5
(France) G Chanfreau	6	7
(France) E Terras	6	4	1
(France) O de Roubin	3	6	6
(United Kingdom) J Cooper	2	2
2	(United States) BJ King	6	6

Third round
7	(West Germany) H Niessen	6	6
(France) G Chanfreau	3	3
(France) O de Roubin	0	0
2	(United States) BJ King	6	6

Quarterfinals
7	(West Germany) H Niessen	2	8	6
2	(United States) BJ King	6	6	1

Preceded by 1970 Australian Open – Women's singles	Grand Slam women's singles	Succeeded by 1970 Wimbledon Championships – Women's singles
