= 1970 in tennis =

This page covers all the important events in the sport of tennis in 1970. It provides the results of notable tournaments throughout the year on both the men's and the women's tennis circuits.

== Australian Open ==
| Category | Champion(s) | Finalist(s) | Score |
|---|---|---|---|
| Men's singles | (United States) Arthur Ashe | (Australia) Dick Crealy | 6–4, 9–7, 6–2. (Note: It was Ashe's 2nd career Grand Slam singles title and his 1st and only title at the Australian Open.) |
| Women's singles | (Australia) Margaret Court | (Australia) Kerry Melville | 6–1, 6–3. (Note: It was Court's 17th career Grand Slam singles title, her 4th during the Open Era and her 9th title at the Australian Open.) |
| Men's doubles | (United States) Robert Lutz (United States) Stan Smith | (Australia) John Alexander (Australia) Phil Dent | 8–6, 6–3, 6–4. (Note: It was Lutz' 2nd career Grand Slam doubles title and his 1st and only title at the Australian Open.) (Note: It was Smith's 2nd career Grand Slam doubles title and his 1st and only title at the Australian Open.) |
| Women's doubles | (Australia) Margaret Court (Australia) Judy Tegart-Dalton | (Australia) Karen Krantzcke (Australia) Kerry Melville | 6–1, 6–3. (Note: It was Court's 13th career Grand Slam doubles title, her 4th during the Open Era and her 6th title at the Australian Open.) (Note: It was Tegart-Dalton's 6th career Grand Slam doubles title, her 3rd during the Open Era and her 4th and last title at the Australian Open.) |
| Mixed doubles | No competition between 1970 and 1986. | | |

== French Open ==
| Category | Champion(s) | Finalist(s) | Score |
|---|---|---|---|
| Men's singles | (Czechoslovakia) Jan Kodeš | (Socialist Federal Republic of Yugoslavia) Željko Franulović | 6–2, 6–4, 6–0 (Note: It was Kodeš' 1st career Grand Slam singles title.) |
| Women's singles | (Australia) Margaret Court | (West Germany) Helga Niessen Masthoff | 6–2, 6–4 (Note: It was Court's 18th career Grand Slam singles title, her 5th during the Open Era and her 4th title at the French Open.) |
| Men's doubles | (Romania) Ilie Năstase (Romania) Ion Țiriac | (United States) Arthur Ashe (United States) Charlie Pasarell | 6–2, 6–4, 6–3 (Note: It was Năstase's 1st career Grand Slam doubles title and his 1st and only doubles title at the French Open.) (Note: It was Țiriac's 1st and only career Grand Slam doubles title.) |
| Women's doubles | (France) Gail Chanfreau (France) Françoise Dürr | (United States) Rosemary Casals (United States) Billie Jean King | 6–1, 3–6, 6–3 (Note: It was Chanfreau's 2nd career Grand Slam doubles title, her 1st during the Open Era and her 2nd title at the French Open.) (Note: It was Dürr's 5th career Grand Slam doubles title, her 4th during the Open Era and her 4th (consecutive) title at the French Open.) |
| Mixed doubles | (United States) Billie Jean King (South Africa) Bob Hewitt | (France) Françoise Dürr (France) Jean-Claude Barclay | 3–6, 6–4, 6–2 |

== Wimbledon ==
| Category | Champion(s) | Finalist(s) | Score |
|---|---|---|---|
| Men's singles | (Australia) John Newcombe | (Australia) Ken Rosewall | 5–7, 6–3, 6–2, 3–6, 6–1 (Note: It was Newcombe's 3rd career Grand Slam title (his 1st in the Open Era), and his 2nd Wimbledon title.) |
| Women's singles | (Australia) Margaret Court | (United States) Billie Jean King | 14–12, 11–9 (Note: It was Court's 19th career Grand Slam title, and her 3rd (and last) Wimbledon title.) |
| Men's doubles | (Australia) John Newcombe (Australia) Tony Roche | (Australia) Ken Rosewall (Australia) Fred Stolle | 10–8, 6–3, 6–1 |
| Women's doubles | (United States) Rosie Casals (United States) Billie Jean King | (France) Françoise Dürr (United Kingdom) Virginia Wade | 6–2, 6–3 |
| Mixed doubles | (Romania) Ilie Năstase (United States) Rosie Casals | (Soviet Union) Alex Metreveli (Soviet Union) Olga Morozova | 6–3, 4–6, 9–7 |

== US Open ==
| Category | Champion(s) | Finalist(s) | Score |
|---|---|---|---|
| Men's singles | (Australia) Ken Rosewall | (Australia) Tony Roche | 2–6, 6–4, 7–6^{(5–2)}, 6–3 (Note: It was Rosewall's 6th career Grand Slam singles title, his 2nd during the Open Era and his 2nd and last at the US Open.) |
| Women's singles | (Australia) Margaret Court | (United States) Rosemary Casals | 6–2, 2–6, 6–1 (Note: It was Court's 20th career Grand Slam singles title, her 7th during the Open Era and her 4th at the US Open.) (Note: With this title, Court completed the Grand Slam (winning all 4 major tournaments in one calendar year).) |
| Men's doubles | (France) Pierre Barthès (Socialist Federal Republic of Yugoslavia) Nikola Pilić | (Australia) Roy Emerson (Australia) Rod Laver | 6–3, 7–6, 4–6, 7–6 (Note: It was Barthès' 1st and only career Grand Slam doubles title.) (Note: It was Pilić's 1st and only career Grand Slam doubles title.) |
| Women's doubles | (Australia) Margaret Court (Australia) Judy Tegart-Dalton | (United States) Rosemary Casals (United Kingdom) Virginia Wade | 6–3, 6–4 (Note: It was Court's 10th career Grand Slam doubles title, her 5th during the Open Era and her 3rd at the US Open.) (Note: It was Tegart Dalton's 7th career Grand Slam doubles title, her 4th during the Open Era and her 1st at the US Open.) |
| Mixed doubles | (Australia) Margaret Court (United States) Marty Riessen | (Australia) Judy Tegart-Dalton (South Africa) Frew McMillan | 6–4, 6–4 |
