= 1970 Wimbledon Championships – Mixed doubles =

Mixed doubles
- 1970 Wimbledon Championships

Final
- Champions: (Romania) Ilie Năstase (United States) Rosie Casals
- Runners-up: (Soviet Union) Alex Metreveli (Soviet Union) Olga Morozova
- Score: 6–3, 4–6, 9–7

Details
- Draw: 80 (4Q)
- Seeds: 4

Events
Singles	men	women		boys	girls
Doubles	men	women	mixed	boys	girls
- Wimbledon Championships

Fred Stolle and Ann Jones were the reigning champions, but Jones did not compete. Stolle partnered with Evonne Goolagong, but lost in the quarterfinals to Ilie Năstase and Rosie Casals.

Năstase and Casals defeated Alex Metreveli and Olga Morozova in the final, 6–3, 4–6, 9–7 to win the mixed doubles tennis title at the 1970 Wimbledon Championships.

== Seeds ==
1. (United States) Marty Riessen / (Australia) Margaret Court (second round, withdrew)
2. (South Africa) Bob Hewitt / (United States) Billie Jean King (third round)
3. (South Africa) Frew McMillan / (Australia) Judy Dalton (semifinals)
4. (United States) Dennis Ralston / (France) Françoise Dürr (second round, withdrew)

Click on the seed number of a player to go to their draw section.

== Draw ==
Key

- Q = Qualifier
- WC = Wild card
- LL = Lucky loser
- Alt = Alternate
- ITF = ITF entry
- PR = Protected ranking
- SR = Special ranking
- SE = Special exempt
- JE = Junior exempt
- JR = Junior Accelerator Programme entrant
- CO = College Accelerator Programme entrant
- NG = Next Gen Accelerator Program entrant
- w/o = Walkover
- r = Retired
- d = Defaulted

=== Finals ===
Quarterfinals
(United Kingdom) Graham Stilwell (United Kingdom) Nell Truman	5	2
(Rhodesia) Hank Irvine (Australia) Helen Gourlay	7	6
(Soviet Union) Alex Metreveli (Soviet Union) Olga Morozova	6	5	7
(Australia) Ray Ruffels (Australia) Karen Krantzcke	4	7	5
(Chile) Jaime Fillol (United States) Kathleen Harter	1	3
3	(South Africa) Frew McMillan (Australia) Judy Dalton	6	6
(Australia) Fred Stolle (Australia) Evonne Goolagong	2	4
(Romania) Ilie Năstase (United States) Rosie Casals	6	6

Semifinals
(Rhodesia) Hank Irvine (Australia) Helen Gourlay	11	3	4
(Soviet Union) Alex Metreveli (Soviet Union) Olga Morozova	9	6	6
3	(South Africa) Frew McMillan (Australia) Judy Dalton	7	2	4
(Romania) Ilie Năstase (United States) Rosie Casals	5	6	6

Final
(Soviet Union) Alex Metreveli (Soviet Union) Olga Morozova	3	6	7
(Romania) Ilie Năstase (United States) Rosie Casals	6	4	9

=== Top half ===
==== Section 1 ====
First round

Second round
1	(United States) M Riessen (Australia) M Court
(United Kingdom) G Stilwell (United Kingdom) E Truman	w/o
(South Africa) K Diepraam (Rhodesia) P Walkden	4	10	6
(Mexico) J Loyo Mayo (Uruguay) F Bonicelli	6	8	3
(Denmark) J Ulrich (United Kingdom) S Holdsworth
(Australia) O Davidson (United Kingdom) W Shaw	w/o
(United States) R Barth (United States) V Ziegenfuss	6	6
Q	(United Kingdom) A Jones (United Kingdom) D Riste	1	2

Third round
(United Kingdom) G Stilwell (United Kingdom) E Truman	4
(South Africa) K Diepraam (Rhodesia) P Walkden	3^{r}
(Australia) O Davidson (United Kingdom) W Shaw	1	7
(United States) R Barth (United States) V Ziegenfuss	6	9

Fourth round
(United Kingdom) G Stilwell (United Kingdom) E Truman	7	2	6
(United States) R Barth (United States) V Ziegenfuss	5	6	1

==== Section 2 ====
First round

Second round
(Rhodesia) H Irvine (Australia) H Gourlay	6	5	6
Q	(Rhodesia) A Fawcett (South Africa) L McDonald	4	7	4
Q	(New Zealand) R Hawkes (New Zealand) M Pryde	w/o
(Rhodesia) A Pattison (South Africa) D Botha
(South Africa) J Saul (South Africa) L Rossouw	5	6	1
(Chile) J Pinto Bravo (Argentina) AM Arias	7	3	6
(United States) G Seewagen (United States) W Overton	6	6
(United States) D Dell (United States) S Johnson	4	1

Third round
(Rhodesia) H Irvine (Australia) H Gourlay	6	6
(New Zealand) R Hawkes (New Zealand) M Pryde	4	4
(Chile) J Pinto Bravo (Argentina) AM Arias	7	3	6
(United States) G Seewagen (United States) W Overton	5	6	1

Fourth round
(Rhodesia) H Irvine (Australia) H Gourlay	6	6
(Chile) J Pinto Bravo (Argentina) AM Arias	2	2

==== Section 3 ====
First round

Second round
4	(United States) D Ralston (France) F Dürr
(Australia) R Keldie (Australia) K Harris	w/o
(Soviet Union) V Korotkov (Soviet Union) E Isopaitis	3	6	7
(United Kingdom) P Curtis (United States) M-A Curtis	6	4	5
(Socialist Federal Republic of Yugoslavia) N Špear (Australia) L Hunt	6	7
(United Kingdom) C McHugo (United Kingdom) W Hall	1	5
(United Kingdom) D Lloyd (United Kingdom) J Williams	7	7	2
(Soviet Union) A Metreveli (Soviet Union) O Morozova	9	5	6

Third round
(Australia) R Keldie (Australia) K Harris	3	6	6
(Soviet Union) V Korotkov (Soviet Union) E Isopaitis	6	3	4
(Socialist Federal Republic of Yugoslavia) N Špear (Australia) L Hunt	3	2
(Soviet Union) A Metreveli (Soviet Union) O Morozova	6	6

Fourth round
(Australia) R Keldie (Australia) K Harris	6	3	4
(Soviet Union) A Metreveli (Soviet Union) O Morozova	4	6	6

==== Section 4 ====
First round
(Australia) R Case (Australia) P Edwards	2	1
(Australia) R Ruffels (Australia) K Krantzcke	6	6
(Australia) R Carmichael (France) G Chanfreau	w/o
(Colombia) W Álvarez (France) O de Roubin
(Japan) K Watanabe (Japan) K Sawamatsu	6	2	1
(Australia) A McDonald (United States) P Hogan	4	6	6
(Australia) R Giltinan (Ecuador) ME Guzmán	5	2
(United Kingdom) R Taylor (United Kingdom) V Wade	7	6
(West Germany) I Buding (West Germany) I Buding	7	11
(United Kingdom) G Battrick (United Kingdom) C Camp	5	9
(United States) G Mulloy (Italy) L Pericoli	6	6
(France) B Paul (France) É Terras	4	4
Q	(Pakistan) M Iqbal (United Kingdom) J Fayter	3	4
(Australia) J Bartlett (Canada) J O'Hara	6	6
(Spain) M Orantes (Spain) MC Muntanola	2	3
(United Kingdom) P Hutchins (United Kingdom) R Bentley	6	6

Second round
(Australia) R Ruffels (Australia) K Krantzcke	6	6
(Australia) R Carmichael (France) G Chanfreau	1	3
(Australia) A McDonald (United States) P Hogan	2	3
(United Kingdom) R Taylor (United Kingdom) V Wade	6	6
(West Germany) I Buding (West Germany) I Buding
(United States) G Mulloy (Italy) L Pericoli	w/o
(Australia) J Bartlett (Canada) J O'Hara	4	6	6
(United Kingdom) P Hutchins (United Kingdom) R Bentley	6	4	4

Third round
(Australia) R Ruffels (Australia) K Krantzcke	3	6	6
(United Kingdom) R Taylor (United Kingdom) V Wade	6	0	3
(United States) G Mulloy (Italy) L Pericoli	3	3
(Australia) J Bartlett (Canada) J O'Hara	6	6

Fourth round
(Australia) R Ruffels (Australia) K Krantzcke	6	8
(Australia) J Bartlett (Canada) J O'Hara	2	6

=== Bottom half ===
==== Section 5 ====
First round
(Australia) J Moore (Australia) F Moore	6	6
(United Kingdom) S Warboys (United States) BA Grubb	2	3
(Chile) P Rodríguez (Chile) M Rodríguez	w/o
(Hungary) P Szőke (Hungary) J Szörényi
(South Africa) G Forbes (South Africa) J Drysdale	2	3
(Chile) J Fillol (United States) K Harter	6	6
(Czechoslovakia) Š Koudelka (South Africa) J Wilshere	w/o
(Rhodesia) R Dowdeswell (United Kingdom) M Greenwood
(United States) T Gorman (United States) D Carter	7	6
(Italy) S Palmieri (Netherlands) G Walhof	5	3
(South Africa) T Ryan (Netherlands) J Salomé	1	2
(Jamaica) L Lumsden (United Kingdom) P Austin	6	6
(South Africa) B Anstey (United Kingdom) S Okin	2	1
(United Kingdom) A Mills (United Kingdom) J Mills	6	6
(Denmark) J Leschly (Sweden) M Pegel
(Australia) I Fletcher (Australia) W Gilchrist	w/o

Second round
(Australia) J Moore (Australia) F Moore	6	6
(Chile) P Rodríguez (Chile) M Rodríguez	4	1
(Chile) J Fillol (United States) K Harter	6	6
(Czechoslovakia) Š Koudelka (South Africa) J Wilshere	3	4
(United States) T Gorman (United States) D Carter	6	6
(Jamaica) L Lumsden (United Kingdom) P Austin	4	3
(United Kingdom) A Mills (United Kingdom) J Mills	5	6	3
(Australia) I Fletcher (Australia) W Gilchrist	7	4	6

Third round
(Australia) J Moore (Australia) F Moore	3	2
(Chile) J Fillol (United States) K Harter	6	6
(United States) T Gorman (United States) D Carter	6	6
(Australia) I Fletcher (Australia) W Gilchrist	3	4

Fourth round
(Chile) J Fillol (United States) K Harter	6	6
(United States) T Gorman (United States) D Carter	3	1

==== Section 6 ====
First round

Second round
(Austria) P Pokorny (Austria) S Pachta	4	7
(United States) G Graebner (United States) C Graebner	6	9
(South Africa) R Maud (South Africa) A du Plooy	6	6
(New Zealand) J McDonald (Australia) K Melville	2	3
(South Africa) R Seegers (South Africa) M Brummer	6	2	1
(Australia) G Masters (Australia) A Crooke	3	6	6
(United States) W Tym (United States) A Tym	1	4
3	(South Africa) F McMillan (Australia) J Dalton	6	6

Third round
(United States) G Graebner (United States) C Graebner	2	6	6
(South Africa) R Maud (South Africa) A du Plooy	6	3	4
(Australia) G Masters (Australia) A Crooke	3	4
3	(South Africa) F McMillan (Australia) J Dalton	6	6

Fourth round
(United States) G Graebner (United States) C Graebner	3	3
3	(South Africa) F McMillan (Australia) J Dalton	6	6

==== Section 7 ====
First round

Second round
(Greece) N Kalogeropoulos (Greece) C-A Kalogeropoulos	1	12
(South Africa) L Sylvester (South Africa) B Kirk	6	14
(Australia) C Dibley (Australia) H Amos	4	9	6
(United Kingdom) J Paish (United States) M Michel	6	7	3
(South Africa) M Baleson (United States) K Pigeon	1	1
(Australia) F Stolle (Australia) E Goolagong	6	6
(South Africa) D Schroder (South Africa) W Tomlinson	4	4
(Denmark) T Ulrich (United States) J Heldman	6	6

Third round
(South Africa) L Sylvester (South Africa) B Kirk	7	6
(Australia) C Dibley (Australia) H Amos	5	3
(Australia) F Stolle (Australia) E Goolagong	6	6
(Denmark) T Ulrich (United States) J Heldman	3	0

Fourth round
(South Africa) L Sylvester (South Africa) B Kirk	3	1
(Australia) F Stolle (Australia) E Goolagong	6	6

==== Section 8 ====
First round

Second round
(United Kingdom) J Clifton (United Kingdom) A Cowie	2	8
(United Kingdom) S Matthews (United Kingdom) E Ernest	6	10
(Australia) W Bowrey (Netherlands) B Stöve	6	6
(Brazil) JE Mandarino (Spain) C Mandarino	2	4
(Australia) G Primrose (United Kingdom) R Lloyd	2	4
(Romania) I Năstase (United States) R Casals	6	6
(United States) R Perry (Japan) J Sawamatsu	0	3
2	(South Africa) R Hewitt (United States) BJ King	6	6

Third round
(United Kingdom) S Matthews (United Kingdom) E Ernest	4	7
(Australia) W Bowrey (Netherlands) B Stöve	6	9
(Romania) I Năstase (United States) R Casals	5	8	6
2	(South Africa) R Hewitt (United States) BJ King	7	6	2

Fourth round
(Australia) W Bowrey (Netherlands) B Stöve	2	4
(Romania) I Năstase (United States) R Casals	6	6
