= 1970 French Open – Women's doubles =

Women's doubles
- 1970 French Open

Final
- Champion: (France) Gail Chanfreau (France) Françoise Dürr
- Runner-up: (United States) Rosie Casals (United States) Billie Jean King
- Score: 6–1, 3–6, 6–3

Details
- Draw: 41
- Seeds: 4

Events
Singles	men	women		boys	girls
Doubles	men	women	mixed	boys	girls
WC Singles	men	women	quad
WC Doubles	men	women	quad
Legends	−45	45+	women
← 1969 ·	French Open	· 1971 →

The women's doubles tournament at the 1970 French Open was held from 25 May to 7 June 1970 on the outdoor clay courts at the Stade Roland Garros in Paris, France. The fourth-seeded team of Gail Chanfreau and Françoise Dürr won the title, defeating the first-seeded pair of Rosie Casals and Billie Jean King in the final in three sets.

== Seeds ==
1. (United States) Rosie Casals / (United States) Billie Jean King (final)
2. (Australia) Margaret Court / (Australia) Judy Dalton (semifinals)
3. (France) Gail Chanfreau / (France) Françoise Dürr (champions)
4. (United States) Julie Heldman / (United Kingdom) Virginia Wade (quarterfinals)

== Draw ==
=== Key ===
- Q = Qualifier
- WC = Wild card
- LL = Lucky loser
- Alt = Alternate
- ITF = ITF entry
- PR = Protected ranking
- SR = Special ranking
- SE = Special exempt
- JE = Junior exempt
- JR = Junior Accelerator Programme entrant
- CO = College Accelerator Programme entrant
- NG = Next Gen Accelerator Program entrant
- w/o = Walkover
- r = Retired
- d = Defaulted

=== Finals ===
Semifinals
3	(France) Gail Chanfreau (France) Françoise Dürr	2	6	6
2	(Australia) Margaret Court (Australia) Judy Dalton	6	2	4
1	(United States) Rosie Casals (United States) Billie Jean King	6	7
(Australia) Helen Gourlay (South Africa) Patricia Walkden	3	5

Final
3	(France) Gail Chanfreau (France) Françoise Dürr	6	3	6
1	(United States) Rosie Casals (United States) Billie Jean King	1	6	3

=== Top half ===
==== Section 1 ====
First round

Second round
(Italy) Monica Giorgi (Italy) Lea Pericoli
2	(Australia) Margaret Court (Australia) Judy Dalton	W-O
(West Germany) Edda Buding (France) Nicole Cazaux	1	1
(Sweden) Ingrid Bentzer (Sweden) C Sandberg	6	6
(Australia) Lexie Kenny (France) C Spinoza	2	3
(Germany) Helga Hösl (West Germany) Helga Niessen	6	6
(South Africa) Esmé Emmanuel (United States) Cecilia Martinez	6	6
(France) Maylis Burel (France) Irene Fraisse	0	0

Third round
2	(Australia) Margaret Court (Australia) Judy Dalton	6	6
(Sweden) Ingrid Bentzer (Sweden) C Sandberg	0	2
(Germany) Helga Hösl (West Germany) Helga Niessen	6	6
(South Africa) Esmé Emmanuel (United States) Cecilia Martinez	1	3

Quarterfinals
2	(Australia) Margaret Court (Australia) Judy Dalton	6	6
(Germany) Helga Hösl (West Germany) Helga Niessen	0	1

==== Section 2 ====
First round
(United States) Denise Carter (United States) Kristy Pigeon	6	6
(France) Françoise Repoux (France) J Venturino	1	4
(Australia) Kerry Harris (Australia) Fay Moore	6	6
(Hungary) Éva Szabó (Hungary) Judit Szörényi	3	0
(South Africa) Brenda Kirk (South Africa) Wendy Tomlinson	6	9
(France) Michele Mizen (France) Claudine Rouire	0	7
(Australia) Lesley Hunt (Netherlands) Betty Stöve	W-O
(Greece) C-A Kalogeropoulos (France) Évelyne Terras
(France) F de la Courtie-Billat (France) A-M Rouchon	6	6
(Sweden) Madeleine Pegel (Sweden) Ulla Sandulf	3	3

Second round
(Japan) Kimiyo Yagahara (Japan) Chikako Murakami	1	4
3	(France) Gail Chanfreau (France) Françoise Dürr	6	6
(Czechoslovakia) A Palmeová (Czech Republic) Vlasta Vopičková	5
(United States) Denise Carter (United States) Kristy Pigeon	2	r
(Australia) Kerry Harris (Australia) Fay Moore	6	6
(South Africa) Brenda Kirk (South Africa) Wendy Tomlinson	2	1
(Australia) Lesley Hunt (Netherlands) Betty Stöve	6	6
(France) F de la Courtie-Billat (France) A-M Rouchon	2	1

Third round
3	(France) Gail Chanfreau (France) Françoise Dürr	6	6
(Czechoslovakia) A Palmeová (Czech Republic) Vlasta Vopičková	2	2
(Australia) Kerry Harris (Australia) Fay Moore	3	3
(Australia) Lesley Hunt (Netherlands) Betty Stöve	6	6

Quarterfinals
3	(France) Gail Chanfreau (France) Françoise Dürr	6	6
(Australia) Lesley Hunt (Netherlands) Betty Stöve	3	3

=== Bottom half ===
==== Section 3 ====
First round
(Japan) Junko Sawamatsu (Japan) Kazuko Sawamatsu	6	6
(France) A-M Cassaigne (France) Nathalie Fuchs	3	2
(United States) Peaches Bartkowicz (Australia) Karen Krantzcke	6	6
(West Germany) Katja Ebbinghaus (West Germany) Edith Winkens	2	0
(Uruguay) Fiorella Bonicelli (Brazil) Suzana Petersen	6	2	6
(France) D Bouteleux (France) Odile de Roubin	1	6	2
(Australia) Helen Gourlay (South Africa) Patricia Walkden	W-O
(Italy) A-M Nasuelli (France) N Niox-Château

Second round
(Japan) Junko Sawamatsu (Japan) Kazuko Sawamatsu	2	3
(United States) Peaches Bartkowicz (Australia) Karen Krantzcke	6	6
(Uruguay) Fiorella Bonicelli (Brazil) Suzana Petersen	2	2
(Australia) Helen Gourlay (South Africa) Patricia Walkden	6	6
(United States) Pam Austin (United Kingdom) Jill Cooper	7	4	4
(Soviet Union) Tiiu Parmas (Soviet Union) Olga Morozova	5	6	6
(Australia) Helen Amos (Netherlands) Judith Salomé	7	2
4	(United States) Julie Heldman (United Kingdom) Virginia Wade	9	6

Third round
(United States) Peaches Bartkowicz (Australia) Karen Krantzcke	4	7	4
(Australia) Helen Gourlay (South Africa) Patricia Walkden	6	5	6
(Soviet Union) Tiiu Parmas (Soviet Union) Olga Morozova	1	1
4	(United States) Julie Heldman (United Kingdom) Virginia Wade	6	6

Quarterfinals
(Australia) Helen Gourlay (South Africa) Patricia Walkden	6	2	6
4	(United States) Julie Heldman (United Kingdom) Virginia Wade	1	6	3

==== Section 4 ====
First round

Second round
(Hungary) Katalin Borka (Hungary) Erzsébet Polgár	0	3
(Argentina) Ana María Arias (France) Janine Lieffrig	6	6
(France) Jacqueline Berson (Hungary) Marie Pinterová	1	0
(South Africa) Marianna Brummer (South Africa) Laura Rossouw	6	6
(Spain) Carmen Mandarino (Chile) Michelle Rodríguez	6	2
(Indonesia) Lany Kaligis (Indonesia) Lita Sugiarto	8	6
(Canada) Stephanie Bardsley (United States) Mary-Ann Curtis
1	(United States) Rosie Casals (United States) Billie Jean King	W-O

Third round
(Argentina) Ana María Arias (France) Janine Lieffrig	6	2	3
(South Africa) Marianna Brummer (South Africa) Laura Rossouw	2	6	6
(Indonesia) Lany Kaligis (Indonesia) Lita Sugiarto	3	4
1	(United States) Rosie Casals (United States) Billie Jean King	6	6

Quarterfinals
(South Africa) Marianna Brummer (South Africa) Laura Rossouw	3	5
1	(United States) Rosie Casals (United States) Billie Jean King	6	7
