= 1969 French Open – Women's singles =

Women's singles
- 1969 French Open

Final
- Champion: (Australia) Margaret Court
- Runner-up: (United Kingdom) Ann Jones
- Score: 6–1, 4–6, 6–3

Details
- Draw: 64
- Seeds: 8

Events
Singles	men	women		boys	girls
Doubles	men	women	mixed	boys	girls
WC Singles	men	women	quad
WC Doubles	men	women	quad
Legends	−45	45+	women
- French Open

Margaret Court defeated Ann Jones in the final, 6–1, 4–6, 6–3 to win the women's singles tennis title at the 1969 French Open. It was her third French singles title and 15th major singles title overall.

Nancy Richey was the defending champion, but lost in the semifinals to Court.

== Seeds ==
The seeded players are listed below. Margaret Court is the champion; others show the round in which they were eliminated.

1. (Australia) Margaret Court (champion)
2. (United States) Billie Jean King (quarterfinals)
3. (United Kingdom) Ann Jones (finalist)
4. (United States) Nancy Richey (semifinals)
5. (United States) Julie Heldman (quarterfinals)
6. (United Kingdom) Virginia Wade (second round)
7. (France) Françoise Dürr (third round)
8. (Australia) Kerry Melville (quarterfinals)

== Draw ==
=== Key ===
- Q = Qualifier
- WC = Wild card
- LL = Lucky loser
- r = Retired

=== Finals ===
Quarterfinals
1	(Australia) Margaret Court	9	6
8	(Australia) Kerry Melville	7	1
4	(United States) Nancy Richey	6	9
5	(United States) Julie Heldman	3	7
(United States) Rosie Casals	2	0
3	(United Kingdom) Ann Jones	6	6
(Australia) Lesley Bowrey	6	6
2	(United States) Billie Jean King	3	3

Semifinals
1	(Australia) Margaret Court	6	4	7
4	(United States) Nancy Richey	3	6	5
3	(United Kingdom) Ann Jones	6	6
(Australia) Lesley Bowrey	1	2

Finals
1	(Australia) Margaret Court	6	4	6
3	(United Kingdom) Ann Jones	1	6	3

=== Earlier rounds ===
==== Section 1 ====
First round
Q	(Argentina) Arias	1	2
1	(Australia) Court	6	6
Q	(France) Cazaux	2	4
(Italy) Di Maso	6	6
(Czechoslovakia) Neumannová	2	0
(United States) Fretz	6	6
LL	(Japan) Sawamatsu	5	1
(South Africa) Walkden	7	6
(Sweden) Sandberg	6	3	4
8	(Australia) Melville	4	6	6
(Indonesia) Liem	1	1
(United States) Bartkowicz	6	6
(South Africa) Kirk	3	6
Q	(Ecuador) Guzmán	6	8
(Brazil) Petersen	w/o
(Indonesia) Kaligis

Second round
1	(Australia) Court	6	6
(Italy) Di Maso	3	1
(United States) Fretz	8	4	3
(South Africa) Walkden	6	6	6
8	(Australia) Melville	6	6
(United States) Bartkowicz	4	2
Q	(Ecuador) Guzmán	6	2	6
(Indonesia) Kaligis	1	6	4

Third round
1	(Australia) Court	6	6
(South Africa) Walkden	4	0
8	(Australia) Melville	6	6
Q	(Ecuador) Guzmán	1	3

Quarterfinals
1	(Australia) Court	9	6
8	(Australia) Melville	7	1

==== Section 2 ====
First round
(Australia) Krantzcke	9	0
4	(United States) Richey	11	6
(Italy) Pericoli	2	5
(France) Chanfreau	6	7
(Netherlands) Salomé	7	1
(Sweden) Lundquist	9	6
(France) de Roubin	6	3	2
(West Germany) Seelbach	4	6	6
Q	(Australia) Young	0	2
5	(United States) Heldman	6	6
(Australia) Hunt	4	9
(United States) Tuero	6	11
(South Africa) Segal	w/o
(Belgium) Loeys
(Greece) Kalogeropoulos	2	2
Q	(Argentina) Giscafré	6	6

Second round
4	(United States) Richey	6	6
(France) Chanfreau	4	4
(Sweden) Lundquist	5	6	6
(West Germany) Seelbach	7	0	0
5	(United States) Heldman	6	6
(United States) Tuero	3	1
(Belgium) Loeys	9	1
Q	(Argentina) Giscafré	11	6

Third round
4	(United States) Richey	6	6
(Sweden) Lundquist	3	0
5	(United States) Heldman	6	6
Q	(Argentina) Giscafré	0	0

Quarterfinals
4	(United States) Richey	6	9
5	(United States) Heldman	3	7

==== Section 3 ====
First round
(France) Terras	4	3
(Soviet Union) Morozova	6	6
(France) Darmon	1	1
(Australia) Moore	6	6
Q	(West Germany) Ebbinghaus	2	5
(United States) Casals	6	7
Q	(France) Rouchon	0	2
6	(United Kingdom) Wade	6	6
(Romania) Dibar	4	1
(Soviet Union) Kivi	6	6
(South Africa) Lieffrig	5	3
(Soviet Union) Jansone	7	6
LL	(Japan) Matsuda	0	4
Q	(United States) Ziegenfuss	6	6
(United States) Pigeon	2	0
3	(United Kingdom) Jones	6	6

Second round
(Soviet Union) Morozova	6	7
(Australia) Moore	4	5
(United States) Casals	5	6	9
6	(United Kingdom) Wade	7	3	7
(Soviet Union) Kivi	7	6
(Soviet Union) Jansone	5	4
Q	(United States) Ziegenfuss	1	2
3	(United Kingdom) Jones	6	6

Third round
(Soviet Union) Morozova	6	2	4
(United States) Casals	4	6	6
(Soviet Union) Kivi	4	0
3	(United Kingdom) Jones	6	6

Quarterfinals
(United States) Casals	2	0
3	(United Kingdom) Jones	6	6

==== Section 4 ====
First round
(Poland) Wieczorek	1	3
(Australia) Bowrey	6	6
(Belgium) Van Haver	0	0
(Japan) Sawamatsu	6	6
(South Africa) Proctor	0	3
(Australia) Gourlay	6	6
LL	(United States) Knode	4	6
7	(France) Dürr	6	8
(South Africa) Tomlinson	2	5
(Italy) Giorgi	6	7
(Hungary) Polgár	7	4
LL	(Argentina) Cavadini	9	6
(Italy) Nasuelli	2	6
(South Africa) Rossouw	6	8
(Czechoslovakia) Vopičková	3	6	5
2	(United States) King	6	3	7

Second round
(Australia) Bowrey	6	6	6
(Japan) Sawamatsu	2	8	0
(Australia) Gourlay	9	4	7
7	(France) Dürr	7	6	9
(Italy) Giorgi	6	6
LL	(Argentina) Cavadini	3	4
(South Africa) Rossouw	4	6	2
2	(United States) King	6	4	6

Third round
(Australia) Bowrey	4	6	6
7	(France) Dürr	6	1	0
(Italy) Giorgi	w/o
2	(United States) King

Quarterfinals
(Australia) Bowrey	6	6
2	(United States) King	3	3

Preceded by 1969 Australian Open – Women's singles	Grand Slam women's singles	Succeeded by 1969 Wimbledon Championships – Women's singles
