= Éva Szabó =

Hungarian tennis player (1945–2022)

- Country (sports): Hungary
- Born: 30 October 1945; Szombathely, Hungary
- Died: 7 November 2022 (aged 77)

Singles

Grand Slam singles results
- French Open: QF (1975)

Doubles

Grand Slam doubles results
- French Open: 1R (1968, 1970)
- Wimbledon: 1R (1971, 1974)
- US Open: 1R (1976)

Grand Slam mixed doubles results
- French Open: 2R (1970)
- Wimbledon: 2R (1971)

Éva Szabó (30 October 1945 – November 2022) was a Hungarian professional tennis player.

Playing for Hungary in the Fed Cup, Szabó has accumulated a win–loss record of 8–5. She played in singles at the French Open in 1975. She lost to the American Janet Newberry in the quarterfinals.

== Career finals ==
=== Singles (7–4) ===
Result	No.	Year	location	Surface	Opponent	Score
Win	1.	August 1966	Budapest, Hungary	Clay	(Hungary) Klara Bardóczy	8–6, 6–3
Win	2.	August 1967	Budapest, Hungary	Clay	(Hungary) Gyöngyi Fehér	6–3, 6–2
Loss	1	September 1968	Budapest, Hungary	Clay	(Hungary) Erzsébet Polgár	4–6, 6–8
Win	3.	July 1970	Budapest, Hungary	Clay	(Hungary) Ágnes Graczol	6–3, 6–1
Loss	2.	October 1970	Bucharest, Romania	Clay	(Romania) Judith Dibar	2–6, 1–6
Loss	3.	July 1971	Budapest, Hungary	Clay	(Hungary) Judit Szörényi	2–6, 2–6
Win	4.	September 1971	Budapest, Hungary	Clay	(Hungary) Erzsébet Széll	4–6, 6–4, 6–2
Loss	4.	August 1973	Pescara, Italy	Clay	(Soviet Union) Olga Morozova	0–6, 6–1, 7–9
Win	5.	September 1973	Budapest, Hungary	Clay	(Hungary) Beatrix Klein	6–3, 6–3
Win	6.	September 1974	Budapest, Hungary	Clay	(Hungary) Katalin Borka	6–2, 6–3
Win	7.	July 1975	Budapest, Hungary	Clay	(Czechoslovakia) Renáta Tomanová	2–6, 7–5, 6–4

=== Doubles (6–2) ===
Result	No.	Year	location	Surface	Partner	Opponents	Score
Win	1.	August 1966	Budapest, Hungary	Clay	(Hungary) Klara Bardóczy	(Hungary) Erzsébet Széll (Hungary) Gyöngyi Fehér	6–3, 4–6, 7–5
Win	2.	August 1968	Budapest, Hungary	Clay	(Hungary) Klára Jószay	(Hungary) Klara Bardóczy (Hungary) Erzsébet Széll	6–0, 6–1
Loss	1.	July 1970	Budapest, Hungary	Hard (i)	(Hungary) Judit Szörényi	(Czechoslovakia) Miloslava Holubová (Czechoslovakia) Vlasta Vopičková	5–7, 4–6
Loss	2.	August 1970	Budapest, Hungary	Clay	(Hungary) Ágnes Graczol	(Soviet Union) Eugenia Isopaitis (Socialist Federal Republic of Yugoslavia) Irena Škulj	1–6, 3–6
Win	3.	April 1974	Monaco, Monaco	Clay	(West Germany) Heide Orth	(Italy) Lea Pericoli (Italy) Daniela Porzio	6–4, 7–6
Win	4.	July 1974	Kitzbühel, Austria	Clay	(Hungary) Beatrix Klein	(Chile) Ana María Arias (West Germany) Iris Riedel-Kühn	6–1, 6–4
Win	5.	September 1974	Skopje, Yugoslavia	Clay	(Hungary) Beatrix Klein	(Uruguay) Fiorella Bonicelli (Czechoslovakia) Miloslava Holubová	6–3, 6–4
Win	6.	March 1975	Beaulieu-sur-Mer, France	Clay	(Hungary) Beatrix Klein	(Italy) Antonella Rosa (Belgium) Monique Van Haver	4–6, 6–3, 7–5
