= 1969 US Open – Women's doubles =

Women's doubles
- 1969 US Open

Final
- Champion: (France) Françoise Dürr (United States) Darlene Hard
- Runner-up: (Australia) Margaret Court (United Kingdom) Virginia Wade
- Score: 0–6, 6–3, 6–4

Details
- Draw: 32
- Seeds: 4

Events
Singles	men	women		boys	girls
Doubles	men	women	mixed	boys	girls
WC Singles	men	women	quad
WC Doubles	men	women	quad
Legends	men	women	mixed
← 1968 ·	US Open	· 1970 →

Maria Bueno and Margaret Court were the defending champions but Maria Bueno did not compete this year.

Margaret Court teamed up with Virginia Wade, and lost in the final 0–6, 6–3, 6–4 against Françoise Dürr and Darlene Hard.

== Seeds ==
1. (United States) Rosie Casals / (United States) Billie Jean King (semifinals)
2. (France) Françoise Dürr / (United States) Darlene Hard (champions)
3. (Australia) Margaret Court / (United Kingdom) Virginia Wade (final)
4. (United States) Patti Hogan / (United States) Peggy Michel (second round)

== Draw ==
=== Key ===
- Q = Qualifier
- WC = Wild card
- LL = Lucky loser
- Alt = Alternate
- SE = Special exempt
- PR = Protected ranking
- ITF = ITF entry
- JE = Junior exempt
- w/o = Walkover
- r = Retired
- d = Defaulted
- SR = Special ranking

=== Finals ===
Semifinals
1	(United States) Rosie Casals (United States) Billie Jean King	7	7
3	(Australia) Margaret Court (United Kingdom) Virginia Wade	9	9
(United States) Mary-Ann Curtis (United States) Valerie Ziegenfuss	3	6	1
2	(France) Françoise Dürr (United States) Darlene Hard	6	3	6

Final
3	(Australia) Margaret Court (United Kingdom) Virginia Wade	6	3	4
2	(France) Françoise Dürr (United States) Darlene Hard	0	6	6

=== Top half ===
First round
1	(United States) R Casals (United States) BJ King	6	6
(United States) G Hansen (United States) P Reese	3	2
(United States) S Grant (United States) P Richmond	7	9
(United States) M Gengler (United States) K Kemmer	5	7
(United States) M Kanarek (Czechoslovakia) J Volavková	2	2
(United States) C Aucamp (United States) K Susman	6	6
(United States) P Bartkowicz (United States) J Heldman	6	6
(Australia) H Amos (United States) W Overton	3	1
3	(Australia) M Court (United Kingdom) V Wade	6	6
(South Africa) B Kirk (South Africa) W Tomlinson	3	2
(Sweden) E Lundquist (United Kingdom) F Taylor	4	0
(Australia) L Bowrey (Australia) K Harris	6	6
(United States) C Capozzi (United States) P Teeguarden	2	1
(Australia) K Krantzcke (Australia) K Melville	6	6
(United States) C Graebner (United States) D Hart	8	1
(France) G Chanfreau (Australia) L Hunt	10	6

Second round
1	(United States) R Casals (United States) BJ King	6	6
(United States) S Grant (United States) P Richmond	1	1
(United States) C Aucamp (United States) K Susman	3	6	3
(United States) P Bartkowicz (United States) J Heldman	6	2	6
3	(Australia) M Court (United Kingdom) V Wade	7	4	6
(Australia) L Bowrey (Australia) K Harris	5	6	4
(Australia) K Krantzcke (Australia) K Melville	4	7	r
(France) G Chanfreau (Australia) L Hunt	6	5

Quarterfinals
1	(United States) R Casals (United States) BJ King	6	6
(United States) P Bartkowicz (United States) J Heldman	2	0
3	(Australia) M Court (United Kingdom) V Wade	7	6
(France) G Chanfreau (Australia) L Hunt	5	1

Semifinals
1	(United States) R Casals (United States) BJ King	7	7
3	(Australia) M Court (United Kingdom) V Wade	9	9

=== Bottom half ===
First round
(Argentina) AM Arias (United Kingdom) M McAnally	6	6
(Canada) J O'Hara (Canada) F Urban	2	4
(United States) E Burrer (United States) L Tuero	6	6
(United States) A Lebedeff (United States) T O'Shaughnessy	4	4
(United Kingdom) C Janes (United Kingdom) N Truman	0	3
(United States) M-A Curtis (United States) V Ziegenfuss	6	6
(United States) D Carter (United States) K Pigeon
4	(United States) P Hogan (United States) P Michel	w/o
(Argentina) A Cavadini (Australia) J Young	2	6	6
(United States) M Aschner (United States) J Davenport	6	2	2
(United States) C-A Thomas (United States) S Walsh	1	2
(United Kingdom) W Shaw (United Kingdom) J Williams	6	6
(United States) M Christenson (United States) J Dixon	1	3
(South Africa) E Emmanuel (United States) C Martinez	6	6
(United States) P Austin (United States) M Cooper	4	2
2	(France) F Dürr (United States) D Hard	6	6

Second round
(Argentina) AM Arias (United Kingdom) M McAnally	5	1
(United States) E Burrer (United States) L Tuero	7	6
(United States) M-A Curtis (United States) V Ziegenfuss	6	7
4	(United States) P Hogan (United States) P Michel	4	5
(Argentina) A Cavadini (Australia) J Young	0	5
(United Kingdom) W Shaw (United Kingdom) J Williams	6	7
(South Africa) E Emmanuel (United States) C Martinez	0	9
2	(France) F Dürr (United States) D Hard	6	11

Quarterfinals
(United States) E Burrer (United States) L Tuero	3	4
(United States) M-A Curtis (United States) V Ziegenfuss	6	6
(United Kingdom) W Shaw (United Kingdom) J Williams	6	3	1
2	(France) F Dürr (United States) D Hard	3	6	6

Semifinals
(United States) M-A Curtis (United States) V Ziegenfuss	3	6	1
2	(France) F Dürr (United States) D Hard	6	3	6
