= 1969 US Open – Mixed doubles =

Mixed doubles
- 1969 US Open

Final
- Champions: (United States) Marty Riessen (Australia) Margaret Court
- Runners-up: (United States) Dennis Ralston (France) Françoise Dürr
- Score: 7–5, 6–3

Details
- Draw: 51
- Seeds: 8

Events
Singles	men	women		boys	girls
Doubles	men	women	mixed	boys	girls
WC Singles	men	women	quad
WC Doubles	men	women	quad
Legends	men	women	mixed
← 1968 ·	US Open	· 1970 →

Second-seeded Marty Riessen and Margaret Court won the title by defeating fifth-seeded Dennis Ralston and Françoise Dürr 7–5, 6–3 in the final.

== Seeds ==
1. (Australia) Roy Emerson / (United States) Billie Jean King (third round, retired)
2. (United States) Marty Riessen / (Australia) Margaret Court (champions)
3. (Australia) Ray Ruffels / (Australia) Karen Krantzcke (second round, withdrew)
4. (Australia) Dick Crealy / (United Kingdom) Virginia Wade (quarterfinals)
5. (United States) Dennis Ralston / (France) Françoise Dürr (final)
6. (Denmark) Torben Ulrich / (United States) Julie Heldman (semifinals)
7. (Australia) John Alexander / (United States) Darlene Hard (third round)
8. (Australia) Bob Carmichael / (Australia) Kerry Harris (third round, withdrew)

== Draw ==
=== Key ===
- Q = Qualifier
- WC = Wild card
- LL = Lucky loser
- Alt = Alternate
- ITF = ITF entry
- PR = Protected ranking
- SR = Special ranking
- SE = Special exempt
- JE = Junior exempt
- JR = Junior Accelerator Programme entrant
- CO = College Accelerator Programme entrant
- NG = Next Gen Accelerator Program entrant
- w/o = Walkover
- r = Retired
- d = Defaulted

=== Finals ===
Quarterfinals
(United Kingdom) Peter Curtis (United States) Mary-Ann Curtis	w/o
(New Zealand) John McDonald (United Kingdom) Christine Janes
4	(Australia) Dick Crealy (United Kingdom) Virginia Wade	4	3
5	(United States) Dennis Ralston (France) Françoise Dürr	6	6
6	(Denmark) Torben Ulrich (United States) Julie Heldman	6	6
(United States) Vic Seixas (United States) Doris Hart	4	4
(Australia) Ken Rosewall (United States) Rosie Casals	4	3
2	(United States) Marty Riessen (Australia) Margaret Court	6	6

Semifinals
(United Kingdom) Peter Curtis (United States) Mary-Ann Curtis	1	1
5	(United States) Dennis Ralston (France) Françoise Dürr	6	6
6	(Denmark) Torben Ulrich (United States) Julie Heldman	3	2
2	(United States) Marty Riessen (Australia) Margaret Court	6	6

Final
5	(United States) Dennis Ralston (France) Françoise Dürr	5	3
2	(United States) Marty Riessen (Australia) Margaret Court	7	6

=== Top half ===
==== Section 1 ====
First round
(Japan) T Kobayashi (Japan) K Hatanaka	6	4	6
(Canada) F Tutvin (United Kingdom) M McAnally	2	6	1
(South Africa) T Ryan (South Africa) W Tomlinson	5	6
(New Zealand) J McDonald (United Kingdom) C Janes	7	8

Second round
1	(Australia) R Emerson (United States) BJ King	6	3	6
(United States) P Fishbach (United States) M Aschner	4	6	3
(United States) M Machette (United States) S Walsh	4	4
(United Kingdom) P Curtis (United States) M-A Curtis	6	6
8	(Australia) B Carmichael (Australia) K Harris	6	6
(Mexico) J Loyo Mayo (United States) P Stewart	4	0
(Japan) T Kobayashi (Japan) K Hatanaka	4	5
(New Zealand) J McDonald (United Kingdom) C Janes	6	7

Third round
1	(Australia) R Emerson (United States) BJ King	11	1^{r}
(United Kingdom) P Curtis (United States) M-A Curtis	9	1
8	(Australia) B Carmichael (Australia) K Harris
(New Zealand) J McDonald (United Kingdom) C Janes	w/o

Quarterfinals
(United Kingdom) P Curtis (United States) M-A Curtis	w/o
(New Zealand) J McDonald (United Kingdom) C Janes

==== Section 2 ====
First round
4	(Australia) D Crealy (United Kingdom) V Wade	9	6
(United States) R Susman (United States) K Susman	7	3
(United States) E Scott (United States) C Graebner	5	4
(Romania) I Năstase (Australia) K Melville	7	6
(Australia) B Howe (United Kingdom) J Williams	5	6	6
(Chile) JR Pinto Bravo (Chile) AM Arias	7	2	4
(Chile) J Fillol (United States) M Gengler	6	1	6
(United States) B Brown (United States) L Tuero	3	6	3
5	(United States) D Ralston (France) F Dürr	6	6
(United States) T Leonard (United States) E Burrer	4	2
(Australia) T Addison (Australia) L Bowrey	6	6	7
(France) G Goven (France) G Chanfreau	8	4	5
(France) P Proisy (France) M Proisy	7	6
(Chile) P Cornejo (United States) M Cardinas	5	3
(United States) P Sullivan (United States) P Hogan	6	6
(Mexico) J Subirats (Czechoslovakia) J Volavková	4	1

Second round
4	(Australia) D Crealy (United Kingdom) V Wade	6	3	6
(Romania) I Năstase (Australia) K Melville	3	6	3
(Australia) B Howe (United Kingdom) J Williams	6	6
(Chile) J Fillol (United States) M Gengler	4	4
5	(United States) D Ralston (France) F Dürr	w/o
(Australia) T Addison (Australia) L Bowrey
(France) P Proisy (France) M Proisy
(United States) P Sullivan (United States) P Hogan	w/o

Third round
4	(Australia) D Crealy (United Kingdom) V Wade	7	17	6
(Australia) B Howe (United Kingdom) J Williams	5	19	4
5	(United States) D Ralston (France) F Dürr	6	6
(United States) P Sullivan (United States) P Hogan	3	4

Quarterfinals
4	(Australia) D Crealy (United Kingdom) V Wade	4	3
5	(United States) D Ralston (France) F Dürr	6	6

=== Bottom half ===
==== Section 3 ====
First round
(Australia) M Senior (United States) J Dixon	4	6	3
(New Zealand) O Parun (Australia) H Amos	6	2	6
(Ecuador) P Guzmán (United States) P Bartkowicz
(United States) G Taylor (United States) K Kemmer	w/o
(Ecuador) M Olvera (Uruguay) F Bonicelli	2	5
(United Kingdom) G Battrick (United Kingdom) W Shaw	6	7
(United States) B Seewagen (United States) P Teeguarden	4	2
6	(Denmark) T Ulrich (United States) J Heldman	6	6
(United States) G Perry (United States) C Aucamp	3	4
(United States) V Seixas (United States) D Hart	6	6
(United States) T Gorman (United States) D Carter	6	7	7
(South Africa) R Moore (Australia) L Hunt	1	9	9
(France) J-B Chanfreau (Australia) J Young	6	2	6
(Australia) R Keldie (United States) P Michel	3	6	4
(United States) Dick Stockton (United States) Donna Stockton	4	1
3	(Australia) R Ruffels (Australia) K Krantzcke	6	6

Second round
(New Zealand) O Parun (Australia) H Amos	6	5	4
(United States) G Taylor (United States) K Kemmer	2	7	6
(United Kingdom) G Battrick (United Kingdom) W Shaw	4	2
6	(Denmark) T Ulrich (United States) J Heldman	6	6
(United States) V Seixas (United States) D Hart	6	6
(South Africa) R Moore (Australia) L Hunt	2	2
(France) J-B Chanfreau (Australia) J Young	w/o
3	(Australia) R Ruffels (Australia) K Krantzcke

Third round
(United States) G Taylor (United States) K Kemmer	1	1^{r}
6	(Denmark) T Ulrich (United States) J Heldman	6	1
(United States) V Seixas (United States) D Hart	6	5	7
(France) J-B Chanfreau (Australia) J Young	4	7	5

Quarterfinals
6	(Denmark) T Ulrich (United States) J Heldman	6	6
(United States) V Seixas (United States) D Hart	4	4

==== Section 4 ====
First round
(Australia) K Rosewall (United States) R Casals	6	6
(Romania) V Rurac (Romania) M Rurac	0	1

Second round
(Australia) K Rosewall (United States) R Casals	6	6
(United Kingdom) R Taylor (United Kingdom) F Taylor	2	4
(Ecuador) E Zuleta (Argentina) A Cavadini	2	3
7	(Australia) J Alexander (United States) D Hard	6	6
(South Africa) R Krog (South Africa) B Kirk	w/o
(United States) H Rapp (United States) P Austin
(Czechoslovakia) J Kodeš (Sweden) E Lundquist
2	(United States) M Riessen (Australia) M Court	w/o

Third round
(Australia) K Rosewall (United States) R Casals	6	4	6
7	(Australia) J Alexander (United States) D Hard	2	6	4
(South Africa) R Krog (South Africa) B Kirk
2	(United States) M Riessen (Australia) M Court	w/o

Quarterfinals
(Australia) K Rosewall (United States) R Casals	4	3
2	(United States) M Riessen (Australia) M Court	6	6
