= List of Hungary Fed Cup team representatives =

This is a list of tennis players who have represented the Hungary Fed Cup team in an official Fed Cup match. Hungary have taken part in the competition since 1963.

== Players ==
| Player | W-L (Total) | W-L (Singles) | W-L (Doubles) | Ties | Debut |
|---|---|---|---|---|---|
| Gréta Arn | 7-9 | 5-6 | 2-3 | 13 | 2008 |
| Tímea Babos | 20-9 | 11-6 | 9-3 | 17 | 2011 |
| Klara Bardoczy | 2-4 | 1-1 | 1-3 | 4 | 1963 |
| Csilla Bartos-Cserepy | 14-11 | 7-5 | 7-6 | 13 | 1981 |
| Lucia Batta | 0-1 | 0-1 | - | 1 | 2007 |
| Anna Bondár | 4-2 | 2-2 | 2-0 | 7 | 2015 |
| Katalin Borka | 0-2 | 0-1 | 0-1 | 1 | 1969 |
| Zsofia Broszmann | 2-2 | 1-1 | 1-1 | 2 | 1963 |
| Ágnes Bukta | 2-0 | 1-0 | 1-0 | 2 | 2017 |
| Virág Csurgó | 6-10 | 0-5 | 6-5 | 13 | 1988 |
| Melinda Czink | 6-6 | 4-6 | 2-0 | 10 | 2003 |
| Anna Földényi | 19-5 | 16-3 | 3-2 | 21 | 1992 |
| Dalma Gálfi | 5-8 | 2-5 | 3-3 | 13 | 2015 |
| Petra Gáspár | 1-7 | 1-5 | 0-2 | 6 | 1994 |
| Zsófia Gubacsi | 12-13 | 5-7 | 7-6 | 19 | 1998 |
| Kata Györke | 3-4 | 0-2 | 3-2 | 5 | 1992 |
| Adrienn Hegedűs | 0-2 | - | 0-2 | 2 | 1998 |
| Réka Luca Jani | 20-17 | 10-10 | 10-7 | 27 | 2010 |
| Anikó Kapros | 3-6 | 1-3 | 2-3 | 9 | 2001 |
| Beatrix Klein | 7-3 | 5-2 | 2-1 | 7 | 1975 |
| Zsuzsa Körmöczy | 1-1 | 1-1 | - | 2 | 1963 |
| Rita Kuti-Kis | 12-9 | 10-7 | 2-2 | 15 | 1994 |
| Petra Mandula | 28-8 | 11-5 | 17-3 | 24 | 1994 |
| Katalin Marosi | 15-13 | 4-5 | 11-8 | 22 | 1997 |
| Ágnes Muzamel | 5-3 | 4-2 | 1-1 | 7 | 1991 |
| Kira Nagy | 6-10 | 4-6 | 2-4 | 11 | 2002 |
| Anna Nemeth | 1-2 | 0-2 | 1-0 | 3 | 1979 |
| Virág Németh | 4-4 | 1-1 | 3-3 | 7 | 2005 |
| Andrea Noszály | 3-2 | 1-2 | 2-0 | 3 | 1989 |
| Barbara Pócza | 1-1 | 0-1 | 1-0 | 2 | 2005 |
| Erzsébet Polgár | 0-1 | 0-1 | - | 1 | 1969 |
| Andrea Ritecz | 2-3 | 1-2 | 1-1 | 3 | 1984 |
| Eva Rozsavolgyi | 6-13 | 3-4 | 3-9 | 12 | 1979 |
| Petra Schmitt | 1-2 | 1-2 | - | 3 | 1988 |
| Fanny Stollár | 7-2 | 3-2 | 4-0 | 9 | 2016 |
| Zsófia Susányi | 0-4 | 0-2 | 0-2 | 4 | 2009 |
| Éva Szabó | 8-5 | 6-1 | 2-4 | 9 | 1966 |
| Ágnes Szávay | 16-8 | 8-3 | 8-5 | 14 | 2005 |
| Erzsébet Széll | 2-2 | 2-0 | 0-2 | 3 | 1966 |
| Réka Szikszay | 14-9 | 3-7 | 11-2 | 13 | 1986 |
| Szabina Szlavikovics | 1-1 | 0-1 | 1-0 | 1 | 2014 |
| Judit Szörényi | 1-8 | 1-4 | 0-4 | 5 | 1979 |
| Andrea Temesvári | 27-20 | 13-14 | 14-6 | 27 | 1981 |
| Réka Vidáts | 3-1 | 1-0 | 2-1 | 3 | 1997 |
