= List of South Africa Fed Cup team representatives =

This is a list of tennis players who have represented the South Africa Fed Cup team in an official Fed Cup match. South Africa have taken part in the competition since 1963.

== Players ==
Player	W-L (Total)	W-L (Singles)	W-L (Doubles)	Ties	Debut
Kelly Anderson	6 – 4	1 – 2	5 – 2	8	2007
Linky Boshoff	13 – 2	5 – 1	8 – 1	11	1974
Marianna Brummer	0 – 1	0 – 1	-	1	1970
Amanda Coetzer	31 – 13	25 – 9	6 – 4	27	1992
Brigitte Cuypers	1 – 4	1 – 3	0 – 1	5	1975
Surina De Beer	5 – 4	3 – 3	2 – 1	6	2000
Mariaan de Swardt	27 – 10	13 – 6	14 – 4	29	1992
Nannie De Villiers	11 – 0	1 – 0	10 – 0	11	1998
Greta Delport	3 – 0	1 – 0	2 – 0	2	1967
Lizaan du Plessis	5 – 6	4 – 3	1 – 3	10	2005
Esmé Emmanuel	0 – 2	0 – 1	0 – 1	1	1966
Rosalyn Fairbank	1 – 2	0 – 2	1 – 0	3	1993
Natasha Fourouclas	4 – 0	1 – 0	3 – 0	3	2011
Maryna Godwin	5 – 2	3 – 1	2 – 1	2	1968
Natalie Grandin	33 – 18	15 – 13	18 – 5	36	2001
Kim Grant	1 – 2	-	1 – 2	3	2001
Ilze Hattingh	4 – 10	3 – 7	1 – 3	14	2012
Liezel Huber	9 – 3	0 – 1	9 – 2	12	1998
Margaret Hunt	4 – 2	2 – 1	2 – 1	3	1963
Mareze Joubert	1 – 0	-	1 – 0	1	2001
Brenda Kirk	17 – 10	10 – 5	7 – 5	15	1969
Lynn Kiro	1 – 2	0 – 1	1 – 1	3	2012
Ilana Kloss	12 – 5	3 – 2	9 – 3	13	1973
Joannette Kruger	9 – 11	6 – 9	3 – 2	14	1992
Madrie Le Roux	15 – 8	3 – 2	12 – 6	23	2011
Janine Lieffrig	12 – 9	3 – 4	9 – 5	14	1963
Andrea Oates	0 – 1	-	0 – 1	1	2008
Alicia Pillay	2 – 8	0 – 4	2 – 4	7	2005
Katie Poluta	2 – 2	2 – 2	-	4	2018
Christi Potgieter	3 – 4	1 – 3	2 – 1	4	2010
Elze Potgieter	0 – 6	0 – 3	0 – 3	5	2006
Tessa Price	1 – 1	-	1 – 1	2	1994
Elna Reinach	16 – 4	5 – 3	11 – 1	16	1992
Nicole Rencken	7 – 4	4 – 2	3 – 2	9	2002
Laura Rossouw	3 – 1	2 – 0	1 – 1	2	1971
Tarryn Rudman	1 – 4	0 – 3	1 – 1	3	2008
Michelle Sammons	1 – 4	-	1 – 4	7	2006
Chanelle Scheepers	17 – 6	12 – 6	5 – 0	19	2002
Renée Schuurman	3 – 3	1 – 2	2 – 1	3	1963
Chanel Simmonds	23 – 21	15 – 16	8 – 5	31	2010
Jessica Steck	4 – 3	3 – 1	1 – 2	7	1997
Greer Stevens	3 – 1	3 – 1	-	4	1977
Glenda Swan	5 – 5	2 – 3	3 – 2	5	1964
Wendy Tomlinson	0 – 2	-	0 – 2	2	1969
Minette Van Vreden	1 – 0	-	1 – 0	1	2018
Annette Van Zyl	12 – 7	8 – 3	4 – 4	11	1964
Bernice Vukovich	0 – 2	0 – 1	0 – 1	1	1965
Pat Walkden	15 – 7	7 – 5	8 – 2	12	1972
