= Marianna Brummer =

South African tennis player

- Country (sports): South Africa
- Born: 24 November 1949 (age 75)

Singles

Grand Slam singles results
- French Open: 1R (1970)
- Wimbledon: 3R (1969, 1970)

Doubles

Grand Slam doubles results
- French Open: QF (1970)
- Wimbledon: 1R (1969, 1970)

Grand Slam mixed doubles results
- Wimbledon: 2R (1970)

Marianna Brummer (born 24 November 1949) is a South African former professional tennis player.

Brummer, who comes from Pretoria, reached the third round at Wimbledon twice, including in 1969 when she was eliminated by Billie Jean King.

At the 1970 French Open she made the women's doubles quarter-finals (with Laura Rossouw) and lost in the singles first round to Eva Lundqvist, after having won a marathon first set 15–13, causing the tournament to fall behind schedule.

Brummer appeared in the Federation Cup for South Africa in 1970, for a World Group quarter-final against the United States in Freiburg, where she was beaten in a singles rubber by Peaches Bartkowicz.

== See also ==
- List of South Africa Federation Cup team representatives
