= 1969 U.S. Clay Court Championships =

Tennis tournament

- Date: July 21–27
- Edition: 1st
- Draw: 64MS / 32WS / 32D
- Prize money: $25,000
- Surface: Clay / outdoor
- Location: Indianapolis, Indiana, US
- Venue: Woodstock Country Club

Champions

Men's singles
- (Socialist Federal Republic of Yugoslavia) Željko Franulović

Women's singles
- (France) Gail Chanfreau

Men's doubles
- (Australia) Bill Bowrey / (United States) Clark Graebner

Women's doubles
- (Australia) Lesley Turner Bowrey / (France) Gail Chanfreau
- U.S. Clay Court Championships

The 1969 U.S. Clay Court Championships was a combined men's and women's tennis tournament held at the Woodstock Country Club in Indianapolis, Indiana in the United States and played on outdoor clay courts. It was the first edition of the tournament in the Open Era, and therefore the first edition to offer prize money. The tournament had been relocated to Indianapolis from its previous venue in Milwaukee, Wisconsin and was held from July 21 through July 27, 1969. The Woodstock Country Club previously hosted the tournament in 1922, 1923 and 1929. Željko Franulović and Gail Chanfreau won the singles titles and earned $5,000 and $1,000 first-prize money, respectively.

== Finals ==
=== Men's singles ===
(Socialist Federal Republic of Yugoslavia) Željko Franulović defeated (United States) Arthur Ashe 8–6, 6–3, 6–4

- It was Franulović's 3rd singles title of the year and of his career.

=== Women's singles ===
(France) Gail Chanfreau defeated (United States) Linda Tuero 7–5, 6–1

=== Men's doubles ===
(Australia) Bill Bowrey / (United States) Clark Graebner defeated (Australia) Dick Crealy / (Australia) Allan Stone 6–4, 4–6, 6–4

=== Women's doubles ===
(Australia) Lesley Turner Bowrey / (France) Gail Chanfreau defeated (United States) Emilie Burrer / (United States) Linda Tuero 6–0, 10–8
