= Emilie Burrer =

American tennis player

- Full name: Emilie Burrer Foster
- Country (sports): United States
- Born: 1947 (age 78–79)
- Plays: Right-handed

Grand Slam singles results
- US Open: 3R (1967, 1969)

Grand Slam doubles results
- US Open: QF (1966, 1969)

Grand Slam mixed doubles results
- US Open: 1R (1966, 1969)

Emilie Burrer Foster (born 1947) is an American former professional tennis player and collegiate tennis coach.

Born in 1947, Burrer is a native Texan and played collegiate tennis for Trinity University, where she won a team record four intercollegiate championships. She won consecutive singles and doubles titles in 1968 and 1969.

Burrer, a Junior Wightman Cup player, represented the United States at the 1967 Pan American Games.

During the 1960s she featured in several editions of the US Open and was a two-time doubles quarter-finalist. In 1969 she made the round of 16 of the singles, beating Carole Caldwell Graebner en route. In 1969 she was a doubles runner-up at the Western Championships in Cincinnati, partnering Pam Richmond and at the U.S. Clay Court Championships in Indianapolis, partnering Linda Tuero.

From 1979-1990, Burrer was the head coach of the Trinity University (Texas) NCAA women's tennis team. Her teams amassed a record of 259-94 (.734) and finished as national runners-up both in 1981 and 1983.

Burrer is a member of the ITA Women's Collegiate Tennis Hall of Fame.
