= Lexie Crooke =

Australian tennis player

- Full name: Alexis Ann Crooke
- Country (sports): Australia

Singles

Grand Slam singles results
- Australian Open: 2R (1966, 1967, 1968)
- French Open: 1R (1970)
- Wimbledon: 1R (1970)

Doubles

Grand Slam doubles results
- Australian Open: QF (1969)
- French Open: 2R (1970)
- Wimbledon: 2R (1970)

Grand Slam mixed doubles results
- French Open: 3R (1970)
- Wimbledon: 3R (1970)

Alexis Ann Crooke is an Australian former professional tennis player.

Crooke, a native of Queensland, won the girls' singles title at the 1967 Australian Championships, under her maiden name Lexie Kenny. She was a women's doubles quarter-finalist at the 1969 Australian Open. In 1970 she competed in the women's singles main draws of both the French Open and Wimbledon. Her husband, Ken Crooke, is a former director of the Queensland National Party.
