= Connie Capozzi =

American tennis player

- Full name: Concetta Capozzi Brown
- Country (sports): United States
- Born: May 21, 1951 (age 75)

Grand Slam singles results
- US Open: 2R (1969, 1970)

Grand Slam doubles results
- US Open: 1R (1969)

Concetta Capozzi Brown (born May 21, 1951) is an American former tennis player.

Capozzi, raised in an Italian-American family in Middletown, Ohio, was a highly ranked junior and won an Orange Bowl (14s) title in 1964. Attending Odessa Junior College, she was a national collegiate doubles champion in 1970 with Pam Farmer. She twice reached the second round in singles at the US Open, and was a quarterfinalist in singles at the 1970 Cincinnati Open.
