= 1968 Swedish Open =

- Date: July
- Edition: 21st
- Surface: Clay / Outdoor
- Location: Båstad, Sweden

Champions

Men's singles
- (Australia) Martin Mulligan

Women's singles
- (United States) Julie Heldman

Men's doubles
- (United States) Arthur Ashe / (United States) Clark Graebner

Women's doubles
- (Sweden) Eva Lundquist / (Soviet Union) Olga Morozova
- Swedish Open

The 1968 Swedish Open was a combined men's and women's tennis tournament played on outdoor clay courts held in Båstad, Sweden. It was the 21st edition of the tournament and was held in July 1968. Martin Mulligan won the singles title.

== Finals ==
=== Men's singles ===
(Australia) Martin Mulligan defeated (Romania) Ion Țiriac 8–6, 6–4, 6–4

=== Women's singles ===
(United States) Julie Heldman defeated (United States) Kathleen Harter default

=== Men's doubles ===
(United States) Arthur Ashe / (United States) Clark Graebner defeated (Spain) Manuel Santana / (Spain) Manuel Orantes 7–5, 6–1

=== Women's doubles ===
(Sweden) Eva Lundqvist / (Soviet Union) Olga Morozova defeated (United States) Julie Heldman / (United States) Kathleen Harter 6–4, 6–4
