= 1969 US Open – Women's singles =

Women's singles
- 1969 US Open

Final
- Champion: (Australia) Margaret Court
- Runner-up: (United States) Nancy Richey
- Score: 6–2, 6–2

Details
- Draw: 64
- Seeds: 8

Events
Singles	men	women		boys	girls
Doubles	men	women	mixed	boys	girls
WC Singles	men	women	quad
WC Doubles	men	women	quad
Legends	men	women	mixed
← 1968 ·	US Open	· 1970 →

Margaret Court defeated Nancy Richey in the final, 6–2, 6–2 to win the women's singles tennis title at the 1969 US Open. It was her third US singles title and 16th singles major overall. Court did not lose a set during the tournament. She would go on to win the next five majors, setting the record for most consecutive major titles in the Open Era at six.

Virginia Wade was the defending champion, but lost in the semifinals to Court.

== Seeds ==
The seeded players are listed below. Margaret Court is the champion; others show the round in which they were eliminated.

1. (United Kingdom) Ann Haydon-Jones (withdrew from the tournament before it began)
2. (Australia) Margaret Court (champion)
3. (United States) Billie Jean King (quarterfinals)
4. (United States) Julie Heldman (quarterfinals)
5. (United Kingdom) Virginia Wade (semifinals)
6. (United States) Nancy Richey (finalist)
7. (United States) Rosie Casals (semifinals)
8. (Australia) Kerry Melville (first round)

== Draw ==
=== Key ===
- Q = Qualifier
- WC = Wild card
- LL = Lucky loser
- r = Retired

=== Final eight ===
Quarterfinals
(United States) Peaches Bartkowicz	2	2
7	(United States) Rosie Casals	6	6
3	(United States) Billie Jean King	4	6
6	(United States) Nancy Richey	6	8
5	(United Kingdom) Virginia Wade	6	6
4	(United States) Julie Heldman	4	3
(Australia) Karen Krantzcke	0	7
2	(Australia) Margaret Court	6	9

Semifinals
7	(United States) Rosie Casals	5	3
6	(United States) Nancy Richey	7	6
5	(United Kingdom) Virginia Wade	5	0
2	(Australia) Margaret Court	7	6

Finals
6	(United States) Nancy Richey	2	2
2	(Australia) Margaret Court	6	6

=== Earlier rounds ===
==== Section 1 ====
First round
(United States) Bartkowicz	6	6
(United States) Lebedeff	1	0
(Uruguay) Bonicelli	6	6
(United Kingdom) Taylor	3	1
(United States) Hard	5	6	6
(Sweden) Lundquist	7	3	0
(France) Dürr	6	7
(United States) Richmond	2	5
7	(United States) Casals	6	6
(Argentina) Arias	2	4
(Australia) Bowrey	7	6
(United States) Netter	5	1
(United States) Overton	7	6
(Czechoslovakia) Volavková	3	2
(United States) Michel	8	6
(United States) Gengler	6	4

Second round
(United States) Bartkowicz	6	6
(Uruguay) Bonicelli	2	3
(United States) Hard	3	3
(France) Dürr	6	6
7	(United States) Casals	6	4	6
(Australia) Bowrey	3	6	2
(United States) Overton	4	4
(United States) Michel	6	6

Third round
(United States) Bartkowicz	6	6
(France) Dürr	4	2
7	(United States) Casals	6	6
(United States) Michel	3	1

Quarterfinals
(United States) Bartkowicz	2	2
7	(United States) Casals	6	6

==== Section 2 ====
First round
3	(United States) King	6	8
(South Africa) Kirk	2	6
(United States) Aschner	2	8	6
(United States) Austin	6	6	4
(United States) Teeguarden	6	8
(Japan) Hatanaka	3	6
(United States) Carter	6	6
(United States) Tym	4	0
6	(United States) Richey	6	6
(United States) Reese	2	1
(United Kingdom) Williams	9	6
(United States) Walsh	7	0
(United Kingdom) Shaw	6	6
(United States) Curtis	3	4
(France) Chanfreau	6	8
(United States) Pigeon	3	6

Second round
3	(United States) King	6	6
(United States) Aschner	3	4
(United States) Teeguarden	6	6	3
(United States) Carter	8	2	6
6	(United States) Richey	6	6
(United Kingdom) Williams	3	1
(United Kingdom) Shaw	6	6
(France) Chanfreau	3	1

Third round
3	(United States) King	6	6
(United States) Carter	1	3
6	(United States) Richey	3	6	6
(United Kingdom) Shaw	6	4	2

Quarterfinals
3	(United States) King	4	6
6	(United States) Richey	6	8

==== Section 3 ====
First round
(South Africa) Tomlinson	6	4	7
(United States) Hansen	3	6	5
(Australia) Hunt	6	6
(United States) Hogan	2	3
(United States) Capozzi	6	3	6
(Australia) Amos	3	6	1
5	(United Kingdom) Wade	6	6
(United States) Kemmer	1	4
(United States) Ziegenfuss	6	6
(United States) O'Shaughnessy	0	1
(United States) Tuero	7	6
(United States) Aucamp	5	3
(Canada) Urban	6	6
(United States) Susman	3	4
4	(United States) Heldman	6	3	8
(United Kingdom) Truman	4	6	6

Second round
(South Africa) Tomlinson	2	4
(Australia) Hunt	6	6
(United States) Capozzi	1	1
5	(United Kingdom) Wade	6	6
(United States) Ziegenfuss	6	8
(United States) Tuero	1	6
(Canada) Urban	1	1
4	(United States) Heldman	6	6

Third round
(Australia) Hunt	7	0
5	(United Kingdom) Wade	9	6
(United States) Ziegenfuss	2	4
4	(United States) Heldman	6	6

Quarterfinals
5	(United Kingdom) Wade	6	6
4	(United States) Heldman	4	3

==== Section 4 ====
First round
(Australia) Young	6	6
(United States) Christenson	3	4
(Australia) Krantzcke	6	6
(United States) Ornstein	3	3
(United States) Martinez	6	6
(United States) Grant	3	3
(United Kingdom) Janes	8	6
8	(Australia) Melville	6	4
(United States) Graebner	6	6
(Argentina) Cavadini	2	4
(United States) Burrer	6	6
(Australia) Harris	4	2
(United States) Grubb	6	6
(South Africa) Emmanuel	3	2
2	(Australia) Court	6	6
(Brazil) Petersen	1	0

Second round
(Australia) Young	3	3
(Australia) Krantzcke	6	6
(United States) Martinez	1	2
(United Kingdom) Janes	6	6
(United States) Graebner	3	4
(United States) Burrer	6	6
(United States) Grubb	1	0
2	(Australia) Court	6	6

Third round
(Australia) Krantzcke	7	6
(United Kingdom) Janes	5	2
(United States) Burrer	0	2
2	(Australia) Court	6	6

Quarterfinals
(Australia) Krantzcke	0	7
2	(Australia) Court	6	9

Preceded by 1969 Wimbledon Championships – Women's singles	Grand Slam women's singles	Succeeded by 1970 Australian Open – Women's singles
