= Erzsébet Széll =

Hungarian tennis player

- Country (sports): Hungary
- Born: 7 December 1945 (age 80)

Singles

Grand Slam singles results
- French Open: 3R (1967)
- Wimbledon: Q2 (1973)

Doubles

Grand Slam doubles results
- French Open: 2R (1967)

Grand Slam mixed doubles results
- French Open: 1R (1967)
Medal record
Representing Hungary
Summer Universiade
Bronze medal – third place	1965 Budapest	Women's singles

Erzsébet Széll (born 7 December 1945) is a Hungarian former professional tennis player.

A five-time national doubles champion, Széll was active on tour in the 1960s and 1970s.

Széll won a bronze medal in singles at the 1965 Summer Universiade and reached the third round of the 1967 French Championships. She played two singles and two doubles rubbers for Hungary in the Federation Cup.

== See also ==
- List of Hungary Fed Cup team representatives
