= Erzsébet Polgár =

Hungarian tennis player

- Country (sports): Hungary

Singles

Grand Slam singles results
- French Open: 1R (1967, 1969, 1970)

Doubles

Grand Slam doubles results
- French Open: 2R (1967, 1969, 1970)

Grand Slam mixed doubles results
- French Open: 2R (1969, 1970)

Erzsébet Polgár is a Hungarian former professional tennis player.

Polgár, who won national singles championships in 1964 and 1968, featured in three editions of the French Open. She competed in a Federation Cup tie for Hungary in 1969, losing her singles rubber to Canada's Faye Urban in three sets.

== See also ==
- List of Hungary Fed Cup team representatives
