= Graciela Morán =

- Country (sports): Argentina
- Born: 18 February 1948 (age 78)
- Plays: Left-handed

Grand Slam singles results
- French Open: 1R (1966)
- Wimbledon: 2R (1969)

Grand Slam doubles results
- French Open: 3R (1969)
- Wimbledon: 1R (1969)

Grand Slam mixed doubles results
- French Open: 1R (1966)
- Wimbledon: 1R (1969)

Graciela Morán (born 18 February 1948) is an Argentine former professional tennis player.

A left-handed player from Cinco Saltos, Morán appeared for the Argentina Federation Cup team in a 1966 tie against West Germany, then in 1967 represented her country at the Pan American Games, held in Winnipeg. She attained Argentina's top national ranking in 1968, winning tournaments including Mar del Plata and Río de la Plata that year.

== See also ==
- List of Argentina Fed Cup team representatives
