= 1969 US Open (tennis) =

- Date: 28 August – 9 September
- Edition: 89th
- Category: Grand Slam (ITF)
- Surface: Grass
- Location: Forest Hills, Queens; New York City, New York
- Venue: West Side Tennis Club

Champions

Men's singles
- (Australia) Rod Laver

Women's singles
- (Australia) Margaret Court

Men's doubles
- (Australia) Ken Rosewall / (Australia) Fred Stolle

Women's doubles
- (France) Françoise Dürr / (United States) Darlene Hard

Mixed doubles
- (Australia) Margaret Court / (United States) Marty Riessen
- US Open

The 1969 US Open (formerly known as U.S. National Championships) was a tennis tournament that took place on the outdoor grass courts at the West Side Tennis Club, Forest Hills in New York City, New York. The tournament ran from 28 August until 9 September. It was the 89th staging of the tournament, and the fourth Grand Slam tennis event of 1969.

It was the last year at the US Open in which sets were decided by a two-game advantage before the introduction of the tiebreak in 1970.

This championship was the first time in grand slam history that two multiple slam sets were accomplished in two different disciplines; Rod Laver won his first multiple slam set in Men's singles, and his fellow countryman Ken Rosewall won it for the first time in the Men's doubles. This would not occur again until the 2012 French Open.

== Finals ==
=== Men's singles ===
(Australia) Rod Laver defeated (Australia) Tony Roche, 7–9, 6–1, 6–2, 6–2

• It was Laver's 11th and last career Grand Slam singles title and his 2nd at the US Open.

=== Women's singles ===
(Australia) Margaret Court defeated (United States) Nancy Richey, 6–2, 6–2

• It was Court's 16th career Grand Slam singles title and her 3rd at the US Open.

=== Men's doubles ===
(Australia) Ken Rosewall / (Australia) Fred Stolle defeated (United States) Charlie Pasarell / (United States) Dennis Ralston, 2–6, 7–5, 13–11, 6–3

• It was Rosewall's 8th career Grand Slam doubles title and his 2nd and last at the US Open.
• It was Stolle's 10th career Grand Slam doubles title and his 3rd at the US Open.

=== Women's doubles ===
(France) Françoise Dürr / (United States) Darlene Hard defeated (Australia) Margaret Court / (United Kingdom) Virginia Wade, 0–6, 6–3, 6–4

• It was Dürr's 4th career Grand Slam doubles title and her 1st at the US Open.
• It was Hard's 13th and last career Grand Slam doubles title and her 6th at the US Open.

=== Mixed doubles ===
(Australia) Margaret Court / (United States) Marty Riessen defeated (France) Françoise Dürr / (United States) Dennis Ralston, 7–5, 6–3

• It was Court's 18th career Grand Slam mixed doubles title and her 6th at the US Open.
• It was Riessen's 3rd career Grand Slam mixed doubles title and his 1st at the US Open.

Preceded by 1969 Wimbledon Championships	Grand Slams	Succeeded by 1970 Australian Open
