= Tiiu Parmas =

Estonian tennis player

- Country (sports): Soviet Union
- Born: 18 December 1943 Tallinn, Estonia
- Died: 23 August 2011 (aged 67)
- Height: 1.65 m (5 ft 5 in)

Singles

Grand Slam singles results
- French Open: 3R (1969)

Doubles

Grand Slam doubles results
- French Open: 3R (1970)

Grand Slam mixed doubles results
- French Open: 3R (1969)
Medal record
Representing Soviet Union
Summer Universiade
Gold medal – first place	1970 Turin	Women's singles
Gold medal – first place	1970 Turin	Mixed doubles
Bronze medal – third place	1970 Turin	Women's doubles

Tiiu Parmas (18 December 1943 – 23 August 2011) was an Estonian tennis player. She competed under her maiden name Tiiu Kivi, until her marriage to coach Jaak Parmas in 1969.

Born in Tallinn, Parmas was the Soviet national champion in 1968 and made the singles third round of the 1969 French Open. Parmas, who was named Estonian Female Athlete of the Year in 1970, won three medals for the Soviet Union at the 1970 Summer Universiade, including gold medals for singles and mixed doubles.
