= Monique Salfati =

French former professional tennis player (born 1945)

- Country (sports): France; Italy
- Born: 18 May 1945 (age 79)

Singles

Grand Slam singles results
- Australian Open: 2R (1966)
- French Open: 2R (1968, 1969)
- Wimbledon: 3R (1965)

Doubles

Grand Slam doubles results
- Australian Open: 1R (1966)
- French Open: 1R (1966, 1968)
- Wimbledon: 2R (1967, 1968)

Monique Salfati (born 18 May 1945) is a French former professional tennis player. She was also known as Monique Di Maso during her tennis career.

Salfati, a two-time French national champion from Cannes, played Federation Cup tennis for France in 1967 and 1968, then appeared in the same tournament with Italy in 1974, following her marriage to Italian tennis player Gaetano Di Maso. She featured in a Federation Cup quarter-final for both countries.

Her best performance in a grand slam tournament was a third round appearance at the 1965 Wimbledon Championships. She had success as a junior, winning the girls' singles titles at the French Championships and Wimbledon, back to back in 1963.

== See also ==
- List of France Fed Cup team representatives
- List of Italy Fed Cup team representatives
