= Judit Szörényi =

Hungarian tennis player

- Country (sports): Hungary
- Born: 8 December 1949 (age 76) Budapest, Hungary

Grand Slam singles results
- French Open: 2R (1970, 1971)
- Wimbledon: 1R (1970)

Grand Slam doubles results
- French Open: 1R (1970)

Grand Slam mixed doubles results
- French Open: 2R (1970)

Judit Szörényi (born 8 December 1949) is a Hungarian former professional tennis player.

Szörényi won nine national championships during her career, three of them in singles. She twice won through to the singles second round of the French Open, beating Betty Stöve in 1970 and Marie Neumannová in 1971.

Later in her career, at the age of 29, she was called up to play for the Hungary Federation Cup team for the first time and featured in nine rubbers, from 1979 to 1980.

== See also ==
- List of Hungary Federation Cup team representatives
