= 1970 French Open =

- Date: 25 May – 7 June 1970
- Edition: 69
- Category: 40th Grand Slam (ITF)
- Surface: Clay
- Location: Paris (XVI^{e}), France
- Venue: Stade Roland Garros

Champions

Men's singles
- (Czechoslovakia) Jan Kodeš

Women's singles
- (Australia) Margaret Court

Men's doubles
- (Romania) Ilie Năstase / (Romania) Ion Țiriac

Women's doubles
- (France) Gail Sherriff Chanfreau / (France) Françoise Dürr

Mixed doubles
- (United States) Billie Jean King / (South Africa) Bob Hewitt
← 1969 ·	French Open	· 1971 →

The 1970 French Open was a tennis tournament that was held at the Stade Roland Garros in Paris in France from 25 May through 7 June 1970. It was the 69th edition of the French Open, the 40th to be open to foreign competitors, and the second Grand Slam of the year. Jan Kodeš and Margaret Court won the singles titles.

== Finals ==
=== Men's singles ===
(Czechoslovakia) Jan Kodeš defeated (Socialist Federal Republic of Yugoslavia) Željko Franulović, 6–2, 6–4, 6–0

• It was Kodeš' 1st career Grand Slam singles title.

=== Women's singles ===
(Australia) Margaret Court defeated (West Germany) Helga Niessen Masthoff, 6–2, 6–4

• It was Court's 18th career Grand Slam singles title, her 5th during the Open Era and her 4th title at the French Open.

=== Men's doubles ===
(Romania) Ilie Năstase / (Romania) Ion Țiriac defeated (United States) Arthur Ashe / (United States) Charlie Pasarell, 6–2, 6–4, 6–3

• It was Năstase's 1st career Grand Slam doubles title and his 1st and only doubles title at the French Open.
• It was Țiriac's 1st and only career Grand Slam doubles title.

=== Women's doubles ===
(France) Gail Chanfreau / (France) Françoise Dürr defeated (United States) Rosemary Casals / (United States) Billie Jean King, 6–1, 3–6, 6–3

• It was Chanfreau's 2nd career Grand Slam doubles title, her 1st during the Open Era and her 2nd title at the French Open.
• It was Dürr's 5th career Grand Slam doubles title, her 4th during the Open Era and her 4th (consecutive) title at the French Open.

=== Mixed doubles ===
(United States) Billie Jean King / (South Africa) Bob Hewitt defeated (France) Françoise Dürr / (France) Jean-Claude Barclay, 3–6, 6–4, 6–2

== Prize money ==
Event		W	F	SF	QF	4R	3R	2R	1R
Singles	Men	FF54,000	FF26,200	FF15,200	FF9,800	FF4,400	FF1,500	FF500	–
Singles	Women	FF16,000	FF8,000	FF4,000	FF2,000	FF1,000	–	–	–

Preceded by 1970 Australian Open	Grand Slams	Succeeded by 1970 Wimbledon Championships
