= Faye Urban =

Canadian tennis player (1945–2020)

- Country (sports): Canada
- Born: 28 October 1945
- Died: 11 November 2020 (aged 75)
- Retired: 1970

Singles
- Career titles: 1

Grand Slam singles results
- French Open: 1R (1968)
- Wimbledon: 2R (1969)
- US Open: 2R (1969)

Doubles

Grand Slam doubles results
- Wimbledon: QF (1967)
- US Open: 1R (1969)

Faye Urban (28 October 1945 – 11 November 2020) was a Canadian tennis player, the top-ranked player in Canada from 1967 to 1969.

== Life and career ==
Raised in Windsor, Ontario, she competed in three of the four Grand Slam tournaments in singles (the French Open, Wimbledon and the US Open) and two in doubles (Wimbledon and the US Open), her best results being reaching the quarterfinals of Wimbledon (1967 in doubles) and the second round of the US Open (1969 in singles). In 1969, she won the Canadian Open (then called the Canadian Championships), the last Canadian to do so for 50 years, until Bianca Andreescu defeated Serena Williams in 2019.

Urban was inducted into the Canadian Tennis Hall of Fame in 1996. She died on 11 November 2020, after battling cancer.
