= Katalin Borka =

Hungarian tennis player

- Country (sports): Hungary
- Born: 27 January 1952 (age 73)

Singles

Grand Slam singles results
- French Open: 1R (1970, 1971)

Doubles

Grand Slam doubles results
- French Open: 2R (1970)

Grand Slam mixed doubles results
- French Open: 3R (1970)

Katalin Borka (born 27 January 1952) is a Hungarian former professional tennis player.

Borka was named Hungarian Female Player of the Year in 1969 and made her only career Federation Cup appearance that year, against Canada in Athens.

A regular French Open participant in the early 1970s, Borka was Hungary's 1972 national singles champion and won a further two national titles in doubles. She represented Ú. Dózsa SC domestically.

== See also ==
- List of Hungary Federation Cup team representatives
