= Anne-Marie Rouchon =

French tennis player

- Country (sports): France
- Born: 26 January 1938 (age 87)

Singles

Grand Slam singles results
- French Open: 3R (1962)
- Wimbledon: 1R (1966)

Doubles

Grand Slam doubles results
- French Open: 2R (1965, 1966, 1970)

Grand Slam mixed doubles results
- French Open: 2R (1968, 1970)

Anne-Marie Rouchon (born 26 January 1938) is a French former professional tennis player. Before getting married in the mid-1960s she competed under her maiden name Anne-Marie Larue.

Rouchon grew up in the town of Saint-Briac-sur-Mer and trained in nearby Saint-Lunaire.

Active during the 1960s and 1970s, Rouchon featured in several editions of the French Championships (later French Open). In 1962 she had a win over 15th-seed Pilar Barril to make the third round for the only time.

Rouchon was a national coach for the French Tennis Federation.
