= Wendy Tomlinson =

South African tennis player

- Country (sports): South Africa
- Born: 18 September 1950 (age 75) Johannesburg, South Africa

Singles

Grand Slam singles results
- French Open: 1R (1969, 1970)
- Wimbledon: 2R (1969)
- US Open: 2R (1969)

Doubles

Grand Slam doubles results
- French Open: 3R (1969)
- Wimbledon: 2R (1970)
- US Open: 1R (1969)

Grand Slam mixed doubles results
- Wimbledon: 2R (1970)
- US Open: 1R (1969)

Wendy Tomlinson (born 19 September 1950) is a South African former professional tennis player.

Born in Johannesburg, Tomlinson began competing on tour in the late 1960s. She represented South Africa in the Federation Cup twice, playing doubles rubbers against Belgium in 1969 and the United States in 1970.

== See also ==
- List of South Africa Federation Cup team representatives
