= 1969 French Open =

- Date: 26 May – 8 June 1969
- Edition: 68
- Category: 39th Grand Slam (ITF)
- Surface: Clay
- Location: Paris (XVI^{e}), France
- Venue: Stade Roland Garros

Champions

Men's singles
- (Australia) Rod Laver

Women's singles
- (Australia) Margaret Court

Men's doubles
- (Australia) John Newcombe / (Australia) Tony Roche

Women's doubles
- (France) Françoise Dürr / (United Kingdom) Ann Haydon-Jones

Mixed doubles
- (Australia) Margaret Court / (United States) Marty Riessen
- French Open

The 1969 French Open was a tennis tournament that was held at the Stade Roland Garros in Paris in France from May 26 through June 8, 1969. It was the 68th edition of the French Open, the 39th to be open to foreign competitors, and the second Grand Slam of the year. Rod Laver won his second Grand Slam title of the year.

== Finals ==
=== Men's singles ===
(Australia) Rod Laver defeated (Australia) Ken Rosewall, 6–4, 6–3, 6–4

=== Women's singles ===
(Australia) Margaret Court defeated (United Kingdom) Ann Haydon-Jones, 6–1, 4–6, 6–3

=== Men's doubles ===
(Australia) John Newcombe / (Australia) Tony Roche defeated (Australia) Roy Emerson / (Australia) Rod Laver, 4–6, 6–1, 3–6, 6–4, 6–4

=== Women's doubles ===
(France) Françoise Dürr / (United Kingdom) Ann Haydon-Jones defeated (Australia) Margaret Court / (United States) Nancy Richey, 6–0, 4–6, 7–5

=== Mixed doubles ===
(Australia) Margaret Court / (United States) Marty Riessen defeated (France) Françoise Dürr / (France) Jean-Claude Barclay, 6–3, 6–2

Preceded by 1969 Australian Open	Grand Slams	Succeeded by 1969 Wimbledon Championships
