= Ana María Arias =

Chilean tennis player

- Full name: Ana María Arias Pinto Bravo
- Country (sports): Argentina; Chile
- Born: 24 July 1946 (age 79)

Singles

Grand Slam singles results
- French Open: 3R (1970)
- Wimbledon: 2R (1970)
- US Open: 1R (1969, 1972, 1974)

Doubles

Grand Slam doubles results
- French Open: 3R (1970, 1971)
- Wimbledon: 3R (1971, 1972)
- US Open: 2R (1969)

Ana María Arias Pinto Bravo (born 24 July 1946) is a former professional tennis player from Chile.

== Biography ==
Arias is originally from Argentina, which she represented when she started playing on tour in the 1960s.

She made the round of 16 at the 1970 French Open as a qualifier and was runner-up in the doubles at the 1971 Swedish Open, partnering Linda Tuero.

In the early 1970s, she married Chilean tennis player Jaime Pinto Bravo and began competing for her husband's country, including in two Federation Cup ties in 1974.

Her three children are competitive squash players, who all won medals for Chile at the 2018 South American Games.

== WTA Tour finals ==
=== Doubles (0–1) ===
Result	Date	Tournament	Tier	Surface	Partner	Opponents	Score
Loss	Jul 1971	Bastad, Sweden	Grand Prix	Clay	(United States) Linda Tuero	(West Germany) Helga Masthoff (West Germany) Heide Orth	1–6, 2–6
