= Eva Lundqvist =

Swedish former tennis player (born 1944)

- Country (sports): Sweden
- Born: 16 December 1944 (age 80)

Singles

Grand Slam singles results
- French Open: 3R (1969)
- Wimbledon: 2R (1967, 1968)
- US Open: 1R (1969)

Eva Lundqvist (born 16 December 1944) is a Swedish former tennis and squash player.

A Federation Cup player for Sweden in 1966 and 1967, Lundqvist featured in a total of three ties, including a World Group 2nd round fixture against the United States, where she faced Billie Jean King in doubles. She was a doubles winner at the 1968 Swedish Open and reached the singles third round of the 1969 French Open.

She was part of the Swedish team at the 1979 Women's World Team Squash Championships.

Lundqvist, who adopted the name Wennerström after marriage, had a daughter named Nina who played professionally.

== See also ==
- List of Sweden Fed Cup team representatives
