= Fay Toyne =

Australian tennis player

- Full name: Fay Toyne Moore
- Country (sports): Australia
- Born: 18 December 1943 (age 82) Australia

Grand Slam singles results
- Australian Open: 3R (1962)
- French Open: 4R (1965)
- Wimbledon: 4R (1968)

Grand Slam doubles results
- Australian Open: QF (1961, 1963, 1964, 1967)
- French Open: F (1966)
- Wimbledon: QF (1969)

Grand Slam mixed doubles results
- Australian Open: 2R (1963, 1964, 1967)
- Wimbledon: 4R (1967, 1968)

Fay Toyne (born 18 December 1943), also known by her married name Fay Toyne Moore, is a retired tennis player from Australia whose career spanned the 1960s.

Toyne was a doubles finalist at the 1966 French Championships. Partnering Jill Blackman they were defeated in three sets in the final by compatriots Margaret Smith and Judy Tegart.

In the singles event her best result at a Grand Slam event was twice reaching the fourth round. At the 1965 French Championships, she lost in the fourth round to Annette Van Zyl, and in the fourth round of the 1968 Wimbledon Championships, she was defeated in straight sets by first-seeded and eventual champion Billie Jean King.

In 1964, Toyne won the grass court South of England Championships in Eastbourne, defeating Lorna Cornell Cawthorn in the final in three sets. In 1966, she won a single tournament in Prague, Czechoslovakia.

== Grand Slam finals ==
=== Doubles (1 runner-up) ===
Result	Year	Championship	Surface	Partner	Opponents	Score
Loss	1966	French Championships	Clay	(Australia) Jill Blackman	(Australia) Margaret Smith (Australia) Judy Tegart	6–4, 1–6, 1–6
