= Brenda Kirk =

South African tennis player (1951–2015)

- Country (sports): South Africa
- Born: 11 January 1951 Rhodesia
- Died: 6 September 2015 (aged 64)

Singles
- Career titles: 0

Grand Slam singles results
- French Open: 1R (1969, 1970, 1971, 1972)
- Wimbledon: 3R (1971)
- US Open: 1R (1969, 1972)

Doubles
- Career titles: 2

Grand Slam doubles results
- French Open: 3R (1969, 1971)
- Wimbledon: 3R (1971, 1973)
- US Open: QF (1972)

Grand Slam mixed doubles results
- French Open: 1R (1970)
- Wimbledon: 4R (1970)
- US Open: 3R (1969)

Team competitions
- Fed Cup: W (1972)

Brenda Kirk (11 January 1951 – 6 September 2015) was a South African tennis player.

== Career ==
Her best singles result at a Grand Slam tournament was reaching the third round at the 1971 Wimbledon Championships.

In January 1971, she won the singles title of the Natal Sugar Championships. She won two doubles titles during her career; in July 1971 she won the Swiss Open partnering Laura Rossouw and in July 1972 she won the Irish Open with Pat Walkden.

She played for the South African Fed Cup team in 15 ties between 1969 and 1973 comprising a record of 17 wins and 10 losses. She was part of the South African team that won the Federation Cup in 1972 after a victory in the final over Great Britain at Ellis Park in Johannesburg, South Africa.

== Personal life ==
Kirk married Jimmy Dimitriou in 1975 and the couple had two children. They divorced and she later married Iain Bryson with whom she had one child. Kirk died in her sleep on 6 September 2015.

== Career finals ==
=== Doubles: 10 (2 titles, 8 runner-ups) ===
Result	W-L	Date	Tournament	Surface	Partner	Opponents	Score
Loss	0–1	Apr 1971	Johannesburg, South Africa	Hard	(South Africa) Laura Rossouw	(Australia) Margaret Smith (Australia) Evonne Goolagong	3–6, 2–6
Win	1–1	Jul 1971	Gstaad, Switzerland	Clay	(South Africa) Laura Rossouw	(France) Françoise Dürr (Italy) Lea Pericoli	8–6, 6–3
Loss	1–2	May 1972	Bournemouth, UK	Hard	(Netherlands) Betty Stöve	(Australia) Evonne Goolagong (Australia) Helen Gourlay	5–7, 1–6
Loss	1–3	Jun 1972	London (Queens), UK	Grass	(South Africa) Pat Walkden	(United States) Rosie Casals (United States) Billie Jean King	7–5, 0–6, 2–6
Win	2–3	Jul 1972	Dublin, Ireland	Grass	(South Africa) Pat Walkden	(Australia) Evonne Goolagong (Australia) Karen Krantzcke	6–3, 8–10, 6–2
Loss	2–4	Jul 1972	Hoylake, UK	Grass	(South Africa) Pat Walkden	(Australia) Evonne Goolagong (Australia) Helen Gourlay	Prize divided (rain)
Loss	2–5	Aug 1972	Cincinnati, US	Clay	(South Africa) Pat Walkden	(Australia) Margaret Court (Australia) Evonne Goolagong	4–6, 1–6
Loss	2–6	Aug 1972	Toronto, Canada	Clay	(South Africa) Pat Walkden	(Australia) Margaret Court (Australia) Evonne Goolagong	6–3, 3–6, 5–7
Loss	2–7	Aug 1972	Haverford (Merion), US	Grass	(South Africa) Pat Walkden	(United Kingdom) Virginia Wade (United States) Sharon Walsh	6–3, 3–6, 5–7
Loss	2–8	Nov 1972	Torquay, UK	Carpet	(United States) Sharon Walsh	(Australia) Margaret Court (United Kingdom) Virginia Wade	4–6, 4–6
