= 1971 US Open – Mixed doubles =

Mixed doubles
- 1971 US Open

Final
- Champions: (Australia) Owen Davidson (United States) Billie Jean King
- Runners-up: (South Africa) Bob Maud (Netherlands) Betty Stöve
- Score: 6–3, 7–5

Details
- Draw: 47
- Seeds: 4

Events
Singles	men	women		boys	girls
Doubles	men	women	mixed	boys	girls
WC Singles	men	women	quad
WC Doubles	men	women	quad
Legends	men	women	mixed
← 1970 ·	US Open	· 1972 →

Marty Riessen and Margaret Court were the reigning champions but both players chose not to participate.

Owen Davidson and Billie Jean King won in the final 6–3, 7–5 against Bob Maud and Betty Stöve.

== Seeds ==
1. (Australia) Owen Davidson / (United States) Billie Jean King (champions)
2. (Romania) Ilie Năstase / (United States) Rosie Casals (semifinals, withdrew)
3. (South Africa) Frew McMillan / (Australia) Judy Dalton (semifinals)
4. (United States) Dennis Ralston / (France) Françoise Dürr (withdrew)

== Draw ==
=== Key ===
- Q = Qualifier
- WC = Wild card
- LL = Lucky loser
- Alt = Alternate
- SE = Special exempt
- PR = Protected ranking
- ITF = ITF entry
- JE = Junior exempt
- w/o = Walkover
- r = Retired
- d = Defaulted
- SR = Special ranking

=== Finals ===
Quarterfinals
2	(Romania) Ilie Năstase (United States) Rosie Casals	w/o
(Mexico) Raúl Ramírez (United States) Janet Newberry
(Rhodesia) Hank Irvine (Australia) Helen Gourlay	1	6	3
(South Africa) Bob Maud (Netherlands) Betty Stöve	6	2	6
(Australia) Bob Carmichael (Australia) Kerry Harris	4	6
3	(South Africa) Frew McMillan (Australia) Judy Dalton	6	7
(United States) Ham Richardson (United States) Jeanne Arth	1	3
1	(Australia) Owen Davidson (United States) Billie Jean King	6	6

Semifinals
2	(Romania) Ilie Năstase (United States) Rosie Casals
(South Africa) Bob Maud (Netherlands) Betty Stöve	w/o
3	(South Africa) Frew McMillan (Australia) Judy Dalton	3	6	2
1	(Australia) Owen Davidson (United States) Billie Jean King	6	2	6

Final
(South Africa) Bob Maud (Netherlands) Betty Stöve	3	5
1	(Australia) Owen Davidson (United States) Billie Jean King	6	7

=== Top half ===
==== Section 1 ====
First round

Second round
2	(Romania) I Năstase (United States) R Casals	6	6
(United States) N Holmes (United States) M Cooper	3	2
(Australia) R Keldie (Canada) V Berner	4	2
(Australia) B Howe (United Kingdom) J Williams	6	6
(United States) J Connors (United States) L Tenney	w/o
(United States) M Elliott (United States) G Hansen
(Mexico) R Ramírez (United States) J Newberry	7	2	6
(United States) D Dell (United States) C Martinez	6	6	1

Third round
2	(Romania) I Năstase (United States) R Casals	6	6
(Australia) B Howe (United Kingdom) J Williams	4	2
(United States) J Connors (United States) L Tenney	4	4
(Mexico) R Ramírez (United States) J Newberry	6	6

Quarterfinals
2	(Romania) I Năstase (United States) R Casals	w/o
(Mexico) R Ramírez (United States) J Newberry

==== Section 2 ====
First round
(United States) P Fishbach (United States) M Aschner	3	4
(Czechoslovakia) M Holeček (Australia) L Hunt	6	6
(United States) F Froehling (United States) C Evert	w/o
(United States) H Hagen (United States) S Johnson
(Rhodesia) H Irvine (Australia) H Gourlay	6	7
(Rhodesia) A Pattison (West Germany) E Buding	4	6
(South Africa) B Maud (Netherlands) B Stöve	6	6
(Indonesia) A Wijono (Indonesia) L Kaligis	4	4
(Pakistan) MA Ilahi (Indonesia) L Liem	6	6
(United Kingdom) G Battrick (Canada) J O'Hara	4	4
(Jamaica) R Russell (United States) S Grant
(United States) C Parry (United States) F Footman	w/o
(United States) P Gonzales (United States) P Teeguarden	6	6
(Australia) T Addison (Czechoslovakia) A Palmeová-West	1	1

Second round
4	(United States) D Ralston (France) F Dürr
(Czechoslovakia) M Holeček (Australia) L Hunt	w/o
(United States) F Froehling (United States) C Evert	5	6	4
(Rhodesia) H Irvine (Australia) H Gourlay	7	4	6
(South Africa) B Maud (Netherlands) B Stöve	6	6
(Pakistan) MA Ilahi (Indonesia) L Liem	2	2
(United States) C Parry (United States) F Footman	1	4
(United States) P Gonzales (United States) P Teeguarden	6	6

Third round
(Czechoslovakia) M Holeček (Australia) L Hunt
(Rhodesia) H Irvine (Australia) H Gourlay	w/o
(South Africa) B Maud (Netherlands) B Stöve	6	6
(United States) P Gonzales (United States) P Teeguarden	4	2

Quarterfinals
(Rhodesia) H Irvine (Australia) H Gourlay	1	6	3
(South Africa) B Maud (Netherlands) B Stöve	6	2	6

=== Bottom half ===
==== Section 3 ====
First round
(Czechoslovakia) V Zedník (Netherlands) A Bakker	6	6
(United States) A Vincent (United States) M McLean	3	1
(Japan) K Hirai (United States) C-L Chang	6	3	4
(United Kingdom) P Curtis (United States) W Overton	3	6	6
(Mexico) J Loyo Mayo (Mexico) E Subirats	7	6
(United Kingdom) J Paish (United Kingdom) S Holdsworth	6	3
(United States) J Austin (United States) P Austin
(Australia) B Carmichael (Australia) K Harris	w/o
(Australia) A Stone (United Kingdom) W Shaw	6	6
(New Zealand) O Parun (Australia) P Faulkner	1	0
(Pakistan) H Rahim (United States) K May	6	6
(United States) E Scott (United States) M Gengler	4	2
(United States) E Baer (United States) K Kemmer	w/o
(United States) G Druliner (Argentina) G Moran
(United States) C Pasarell (United States) A May	3	2
3	(South Africa) F McMillan (Australia) J Dalton	6	6

Second round
(Czechoslovakia) V Zedník (Netherlands) A Bakker	7	6
(United Kingdom) P Curtis (United States) W Overton	5	3
(Mexico) J Loyo Mayo (Mexico) E Subirats
(Australia) B Carmichael (Australia) K Haris	w/o
(Australia) A Stone (United Kingdom) W Shaw	4	2
(Pakistan) H Rahim (United States) K May	6	6
(United States) E Baer (United States) K Kemmer	0	2
3	(South Africa) F McMillan (Australia) J Dalton	6	6

Third round
(Czechoslovakia) V Zedník (Netherlands) A Bakker	4	6	2
(Australia) B Carmichael (Australia) K Haris	6	4	6
(Pakistan) H Rahim (United States) K May	3	2
3	(South Africa) F McMillan (Australia) J Dalton	6	6

Quarterfinals
(Australia) B Carmichael (Australia) K Haris	4	6
3	(South Africa) F McMillan (Australia) J Dalton	6	7

==== Section 4 ====
First round

Second round
(United States) H Richardson (United States) J Arth	4	6	7
(United States) W Higgins (United States) C Aucamp	6	2	5
(South Africa) P Cramer (United States) L Gonnerman	6	6
(Japan) J Kuki (France) N Fuchs	0	2
(Argentina) T Vázquez (Argentina) R Giscafré	6	6
(Japan) T Sakai (Japan) J Sawamatsu	1	1
(United States) G Mulloy (United States) B Smith	1	4
1	(Australia) O Davidson (United States) BJ King	6	6

Third round
(United States) H Richardson (United States) J Arth	6	6
(South Africa) P Cramer (United States) L Gonnerman	2	0
(Argentina) T Vázquez (Argentina) R Giscafré
1	(Australia) O Davidson (United States) BJ King	w/o

Quarterfinals
(United States) H Richardson (United States) J Arth	1	3
1	(Australia) O Davidson (United States) BJ King	6	6
