= 1971 US Open – Women's doubles =

Women's doubles
- 1971 US Open

Final
- Champion: (United States) Rosemary Casals (Australia) Judy Dalton
- Runner-up: (France) Gail Chanfreau (France) Françoise Dürr
- Score: 6–3, 6–3

Details
- Draw: 32
- Seeds: 8

Events
Singles	men	women		boys	girls
Doubles	men	women	mixed	boys	girls
WC Singles	men	women	quad
WC Doubles	men	women	quad
Legends	men	women	mixed
← 1970 ·	US Open	· 1972 →

Margaret Court and Judy Dalton were the reigning champions but Margaret Court did not compete this year.

Judy Dalton teamed up with Rosemary Casals and successfully defended her title by defeating Gail Chanfreau and Françoise Dürr 6–3, 6–3 in the final.

== Seeds ==
1. (United States) Rosie Casals / (Australia) Judy Dalton (champions)
2. (France) Gail Chanfreau / (France) Françoise Dürr (final)
3. (United States) Mary-Ann Eisel / (United States) Valerie Ziegenfuss (semifinals)
4. (Australia) Kerry Melville / (United States) Nancy Richey (semifinals)
5. (United Kingdom) Winnie Shaw / (Netherlands) Betty Stöve (quarterfinals)
6. (Australia) Wendy Gilchrist / (United States) Julie Heldman (second round)
7. (United States) Patti Hogan / (United Kingdom) Joyce Williams (quarterfinals)
8. (Australia) Helen Gourlay / (Australia) Kerry Harris (quarterfinals)

== Draw ==
=== Key ===
- Q = Qualifier
- WC = Wild card
- LL = Lucky loser
- Alt = Alternate
- ITF = ITF entry
- PR = Protected ranking
- SR = Special ranking
- SE = Special exempt
- JE = Junior exempt
- JR = Junior Accelerator Programme entrant
- CO = College Accelerator Programme entrant
- NG = Next Gen Accelerator Program entrant
- w/o = Walkover
- r = Retired
- d = Defaulted

=== Finals ===
Semifinals
1	(United States) Rosie Casals (Australia) Judy Dalton	6	6
4	(Australia) Kerry Melville (United States) Nancy Richey	3	0
3	(United States) Mary-Ann Eisel (United States) Valerie Ziegenfuss	4	0
2	(France) Gail Chanfreau (France) Françoise Dürr	6	6

Final
1	(United States) Rosie Casals (Australia) Judy Dalton	6	6
2	(France) Gail Chanfreau (France) Françoise Dürr	3	3

=== Top half ===
First round
1	(United States) R Casals (Australia) J Dalton	6	6
(Argentina) R Giscafré (Mexico) E Subirats	4	1
(United States) Sandy Stap (United States) Sue Stap	4	4
(West Germany) E Buding (United States) F Footman	6	6
7	(United States) P Hogan (United Kingdom) J Williams	6	6
(Australia) P Faulkner (United Kingdom) S Holdsworth	4	2
(United States) C-L Chang (Japan) J Sawamatsu	6	0	3
(United States) P Bostrom (United States) M Louie	4	6	6
4	(Australia) K Melville (United States) N Richey	6	6
(United States) P Austin (United States) M Cooper	3	2
(United States) L duPont (United States) M Gengler	7	6
(United States) J Arth (United States) G Moran	5	4
5	(United Kingdom) W Shaw (Netherlands) B Stöve	6	3	6
(United States) J Newberry (United States) E Pande	1	6	3
(United States) P Farmer (United States) J Metcalf	2	6	1
(United States) B-A Hansen (United States) W Overton	6	4	6

Second round
1	(United States) R Casals (Australia) J Dalton	6	6
(West Germany) E Buding (United States) F Footman	2	3
7	(United States) P Hogan (United Kingdom) J Williams	6	6
(United States) P Bostrom (United States) M Louie	1	1
4	(Australia) K Melville (United States) N Richey	6	6
(United States) L duPont (United States) M Gengler	2	4
5	(United Kingdom) W Shaw (Netherlands) B Stöve	1	6	6
(United States) B-A Hansen (United States) W Overton	6	2	2

Quarterfinals
1	(United States) R Casals (Australia) J Dalton	6	6
7	(United States) P Hogan (United Kingdom) J Williams	3	4
4	(Australia) K Melville (United States) N Richey	6	5	6
5	(United Kingdom) W Shaw (Netherlands) B Stöve	2	7	1

Semifinals
1	(United States) R Casals (Australia) J Dalton	6	6
4	(Australia) K Melville (United States) N Richey	3	0

=== Bottom half ===
First round
(Australia) L Hunt (United States) K Pigeon	5	6	6
(United States) K Kemmer (United States) P Reese	7	4	3
(United States) C Aucamp (United States) S Johnson	4	0
6	(Australia) W Gilchrist (United States) J Heldman	6	6
(United States) C Martinez (Sweden) C Sandberg	6	6
(United States) N Ornstein (United States) M Schallau	3	4
(United States) G Hansen (United States) T O'Shaughnessy	4	1
3	(United States) M-A Eisel (United States) V Ziegenfuss	6	6
(United Kingdom) J Cooper (United Kingdom) C Molesworth	6	1	4
(United States) P Teeguarden (United States) L Tuero	3	6	6
(Netherlands) A Bakker (Czechoslovakia) A Palmeová-West	1	4
8	(Australia) H Gourlay (Australia) K Harris	6	6
(Canada) V Berner (Canada) J O'Hara	6	4	4
(United States) M Redondo (United States) L Tenney	4	6	6
(United States) M Aschner (United States) L Gonnerman	1	1
2	(France) G Chanfreau (France) F Dürr	6	6

Second round
(Australia) L Hunt (United States) K Pigeon	6	6
6	(Australia) W Gilchrist (United States) J Heldman	3	2
(United States) C Martinez (Sweden) C Sandberg	6	3
3	(United States) M-A Eisel (United States) V Ziegenfuss	7	6
(United States) P Teeguarden (United States) L Tuero	6	4	3
8	(Australia) H Gourlay (Australia) K Harris	1	6	6
(United States) M Redondo (United States) L Tenney	3	0
2	(France) G Chanfreau (France) F Dürr	6	6

Quarterfinals
(Australia) L Hunt (United States) K Pigeon	2	2
3	(United States) M-A Eisel (United States) V Ziegenfuss	6	6
8	(Australia) H Gourlay (Australia) K Harris	5	4
2	(France) G Chanfreau (France) F Dürr	7	6

Semifinals
3	(United States) M-A Eisel (United States) V Ziegenfuss	4	0
2	(France) G Chanfreau (France) F Dürr	6	6
