= 1970 Wimbledon Championships – Women's singles qualifying =

Women's singles qualifying
- 1970 Wimbledon Championships

Events
Singles	men	women		boys	girls
Doubles	men	women	mixed	boys	girls
WC Singles	men	women	quad
WC Doubles	men	women	quad
Legends	men	women	seniors

Qualification
Singles	men	women
Doubles	men	women	mixed
- Wimbledon Championships

Players who neither had high enough rankings nor received wild cards to enter the main draw of the annual Wimbledon Tennis Championships participated in a qualifying tournament held one week before the event.

== Qualifiers ==
1. (Japan) Chikako Murakami
2. (Australia) Sue Alexander
3. (United Kingdom) Jackie Fayter
4. (Australia) Frances Luff
5. (Canada) Jane O'Hara
6. (Australia) Sandra Walsham
7. (New Zealand) Marilyn Pryde
8. (United Kingdom) Sally Holdsworth

== Lucky losers ==
1. (United Kingdom) Marilyn Greenwood

== Qualifying draw ==
Key

- Q = Qualifier
- WC = Wild card
- LL = Lucky loser
- Alt = Alternate
- ITF = ITF entry
- PR = Protected ranking
- SR = Special ranking
- SE = Special exempt
- JE = Junior exempt
- JR = Junior Accelerator Programme entrant
- CO = College Accelerator Programme entrant
- NG = Next Gen Accelerator Program entrant
- w/o = Walkover
- r = Retired
- d = Defaulted

=== First qualifier ===
First round
1	(Japan) Chikako Murakami	2	6	6
8	(South Africa) Linda McDonald	6	4	2
4	(Australia) Adrienne Avis	4	6	6
5	(United Kingdom) Sue Huntington	6	1	2
2	(United Kingdom) Marilyn Greenwood	6	6
7	(Spain) M.C. Muntola	0	3
3	(United Kingdom) Mary McAnally	6	7
6	(United Kingdom) Ruth Illingworth	3	5

Second round
(Japan) Chikako Murakami	6	6
(Australia) Adrienne Avis	2	3
(United Kingdom) Marilyn Greenwood	6	6
(United Kingdom) Mary McAnally	2	1

Qualifying competition
(Japan) Chikako Murakami	3	6	7
(United Kingdom) Marilyn Greenwood	6	4	5

=== Second qualifier ===
First round
1	(United Kingdom) Judy Congdon	7	6
8	(United Kingdom) Jackie Pallister	5	1
4	(Austria) Sonia Pachta	6	6
5	(United Kingdom) Caroline Peerless	2	0
2	(Australia) Sue Alexander	6	6
7	(United Kingdom) Christianne George	1	2
3	(United Kingdom) Heather Allen	6	6
6	(Spain) M. Sansacana	1	2

Second round
(United Kingdom) Judy Congdon	6	6
(Austria) Sonia Pachta	4	4
(Australia) Sue Alexander	6	5	6
(United Kingdom) Heather Allen	3	7	1

Qualifying competition
(United Kingdom) Judy Congdon	6	3	0
(Australia) Sue Alexander	3	6	6

=== Third qualifier ===
First round
1	(United Kingdom) Jackie Fayter	6	6
8	(United Kingdom) Claire Colman	2	4
4	(United States) Pam Austin	6	6
5	(Austria) Maria Hollingsworth	2	3
2	(New Zealand) Robin Legge	6	2	6
7	(United Kingdom) Margaret Kennedy	1	6	2
3	(Canada) S.M. Eager	7	6	6
6	(United Kingdom) Penny Moor	9	4	4

Second round
(United Kingdom) Jackie Fayter	6	6
(United States) Pam Austin	4	4
(New Zealand) Robin Legge	6	6
(Canada) S.M. Eager	1	1

Qualifying competition
(United Kingdom) Jackie Fayter	6	6
(New Zealand) Robin Legge	3	2

=== Fourth qualifier ===
First round
1	(Australia) Frances Luff	6	6
8	(United Kingdom) Diane Bridger	3	4
4	(South Africa) S. Gouws	4	6	6
5	(Socialist Federal Republic of Yugoslavia) Irena Skulj	6	2	0
2	(United Kingdom) Penny Hardgrave	6	6
7	(United Kingdom) Lesley Charles	4	3
3	(United Kingdom) Jane Poynder	5	6	6
6	(United Kingdom) Wendy Slaughter	7	4	2

Second round
(Australia) Frances Luff	6	6
(South Africa) S. Gouws	0	2
(United Kingdom) Penny Hardgrave	6	6
(United Kingdom) Jane Poynder	1	1

Qualifying competition
(Australia) Frances Luff	6	6
(United Kingdom) Penny Hardgrave	3	2

=== Fifth qualifier ===
First round
1	(Netherlands) Judith Salomé	6	6
8	(United Kingdom) Peppy Munslow	4	0
4	(United States) P. Adams	7	9
5	(United Kingdom) Carolyn Camp	5	7
2	(Canada) Jane O'Hara	6	6
7	(United Kingdom) K Wiseman	4	2
3	(United Kingdom) Janet Ward	9	6
6	(United Kingdom) Marilyn Bevan	7	1

Second round
(Netherlands) Judith Salomé	6	6
(United States) P. Adams	2	3
(Canada) Jane O'Hara	1	6	6
(United Kingdom) Janet Ward	6	0	4

Qualifying competition
(Netherlands) Judith Salomé	6	3
(Canada) Jane O'Hara	8	6

=== Sixth qualifier ===
First round
1	(Australia) Sandra Walsham	8	7
8	(Spain) María-José Aubet	6	5
4	(Canada) Janice Tindle	6	6
5	(United Kingdom) Jean Fyfe	4	2
2	(Australia) Helen Sheedy	6	1	6
7	(United Kingdom) J.E. Grundy	1	6	4
3	(United Kingdom) Diane Riste	7	2	6
6	(India) Nirupama Mankad	5	6	3

Second round
(Australia) Sandra Walsham	3	6	6
(Canada) Janice Tindle	6	4	3
(Australia) Helen Sheedy	9	10
(United Kingdom) Diane Riste	7	8

Qualifying competition
(Australia) Sandra Walsham	6	6
(Australia) Helen Sheedy	4	2

=== Seventh qualifier ===
First round
1	(New Zealand) Marilyn Pryde	6	6
8	(United Kingdom) H.D. Merrick	3	2
4	(Australia) Helen Kayser	3	7	6
5	(United Kingdom) Jenny Helliar	6	5	4
2	(United Kingdom) Lindsay Blachford	6	6
7	(Canada) J.A. Bardsley	0	3
3	(Chile) Michelle Rodriguez	6	4	6
6	(United Kingdom) L. Wellerman	1	6	1

Second round
(New Zealand) Marilyn Pryde	6	6
(Australia) Helen Kayser	2	0
(United Kingdom) Lindsay Blachford	6	6
(Chile) Michelle Rodriguez	2	4

Qualifying competition
(New Zealand) Marilyn Pryde	6	6
(United Kingdom) Lindsay Blachford	3	1

=== Eighth qualifier ===
First round
1	(Belgium) Monique Van Haver	4	6	6
8	(United Kingdom) Lorna Cawthorn	6	3	2
4	(United Kingdom) Sandra Okin	4	6	6
5	(Sweden) Madelaine Pegel	6	1	0
2	(United Kingdom) Sally Holdsworth	6	6
7	(Australia) Barbara Walsh	2	4
3	(Japan) Junko Sawamatsu	6	6
6	(United Kingdom) Binnie Orchard	1	1

Second round
(Belgium) Monique Van Haver	6	3	7
(United Kingdom) Sandra Okin	2	6	5
(United Kingdom) Sally Holdsworth	6	6
(Japan) Junko Sawamatsu	2	3

Qualifying competition
(Belgium) Monique Van Haver	2	7
(United Kingdom) Sally Holdsworth	6	9
