= 1971 US Open – Women's singles =

Women's singles
- 1971 US Open

Final
- Champion: (United States) Billie Jean King
- Runner-up: (United States) Rosemary Casals
- Score: 6–4, 7–6^{(5–2)}

Details
- Draw: 64
- Seeds: 8

Events
| Singles | men | women | | boys | girls |
| Doubles | men | women | mixed | boys | girls |
| WC Singles | men | women | quad |
| WC Doubles | men | women | quad |
| Legends | men | women | mixed |
| ← 1970 · | US Open | · 1972 → |

Billie Jean King defeated Rosemary Casals in the final, 6–4, 7–6^{(5–2)} to win the women's singles tennis title at the 1971 US Open. It was her second US Open singles title and sixth major singles title overall. For the second time in her career, King did not lose a set during the tournament.

Margaret Court was the two-time reigning champion, but did not participate this year.

This tournament marked the first major in which future world No. 1 and 18-time major singles champion Chris Evert competed in the main draw; she lost to King in the semifinals. Evert was 16 years, 8 months and 19 days old at the time and competed in 19 consecutive US Opens until her retirement in 1989. She would make at least the semifinals in her first 16 US Opens, before being knocked out of the 1987 quarterfinals. Evert would make a seventeenth semifinal in 1988 and ending her career with only her second quarterfinal loss in 1989.

== Seeds ==
The seeded players are listed below. Billie Jean King is the champion; others show the round in which they were eliminated.

1. (United States) Billie Jean King (champion)
2. (United States) Rosemary Casals (final)
3. (United Kingdom) Virginia Wade (withdrew before the tournament began)
4. (Australia) Kerry Melville (semifinalist)
5. (France) Françoise Dürr (third round)
6. (Australia) Judy Tegart-Dalton (quarterfinalist)
7. (United States) Nancy Richey (third round)
8. (United States) Julie Heldman (third round)

== Draw ==
=== Key ===
- Q = Qualifier
- WC = Wild card
- LL = Lucky loser
- r = Retired

=== Final eight ===
Quarterfinals
1 | (United States) Billie Jean King | 6 | 7
(United States) Laura duPont | 3 | 5
(Australia) Lesley Hunt | 6 | 2 | 3
(United States) Chris Evert | 4 | 6 | 6
6 | (Australia) Judy Tegart-Dalton | 3 | 5
4 | (Australia) Kerry Melville | 6 | 7
(United Kingdom) Joyce Williams | 4 | 6 | 4
2 | (United States) Rosemary Casals | 6 | 2 | 6

Semifinals
1 | (United States) Billie Jean King | 6 | 6
(United States) Chris Evert | 3 | 2
4 | (Australia) Kerry Melville | 4 | 3
2 | (United States) Rosemary Casals | 6 | 6

Finals
1 | (United States) Billie Jean King | 6 | 7
2 | (United States) Rosemary Casals | 4 | 6

=== Earlier rounds ===
==== Section 1 ====
First round
1 | (United States) King | 6 | 6
(United States) Arth | 0 | 1
(Australia) Gourlay | 6 | 6
(United States) Kraft | 3 | 4
(United States) Austin | 6 | 0 | 6
(United States) Stap | 4 | 6 | 2
(United States) Tuero | 6 | 3 | 7
(United States) Ziegenfuss | 1 | 6 | 6
7 | (United States) Richey | 6 | 6
(United States) Martinez | 2 | 3
(Mexico) Subirats | 6 | 6
(United States) Stap | 0 | 3
(United States) duPont | 6 | 6
(United States) Footman | 3 | 1
(Sweden) Sandberg | 4 | 6 | 6
(United States) Hogan | 6 | 3 | 2

Second round
1 | (United States) King | 6 | 6
(Australia) Gourlay | 1 | 2
(United States) Austin | 2 | 2
(United States) Tuero | 6 | 6
7 | (United States) Richey | 6 | 6
(Mexico) Subirats | 3 | 1
(United States) duPont | 6 | 6
(Sweden) Sandberg | 4 | 1

Third round
1 | (United States) King | 6 | 6
(United States) Tuero | 0 | 2
7 | (United States) Richey | 6 | 2 | 4
(United States) duPont | 0 | 6 | 6

Quarterfinals
1 | (United States) King | 6 | 7
(United States) duPont | 3 | 5

==== Section 2 ====
First round
(Australia) Gilchrist | 7 | 7
(United States) Schallau | 6 | 6
(United States) Tenney | 6 | 6
(United States) Gonnerman | 1 | 3
(Australia) Hunt | 7 | 6
(Argentina) Giscafré | 5 | 0
(United States) Downs | 6 | 1 | 7
(United Kingdom) Cooper | 2 | 6 | 5
5 | (France) Dürr | 6 | 6
(United States) Aucamp | 4 | 0
(Indonesia) Liem | 6 | 6
(United States) Reese | 3 | 1
(United States) Eisel | 6 | 6
(United Kingdom) Holdsworth | 0 | 2
(United States) Evert | 6 | 6
(West Germany) Buding | 1 | 0

Second round
(Australia) Gilchrist | 7 | 6
(United States) Tenney | 5 | 4
(Australia) Hunt | 6 | 6
(United States) Downs | 1 | 2
5 | (France) Dürr | 6 | 6
(Indonesia) Liem | 0 | 2
(United States) Eisel | 6 | 6 | 1
(United States) Evert | 4 | 7 | 6

Third round
(Australia) Gilchrist | 1 | 1
(Australia) Hunt | 6 | 6
5 | (France) Dürr | 6 | 2 | 3
(United States) Evert | 2 | 6 | 6

Quarterfinals
(Australia) Hunt | 6 | 2 | 3
(United States) Evert | 4 | 6 | 6

==== Section 3 ====
First round
(France) Chanfreau | 6 | 6
(Japan) Sawamatsu | 2 | 1
(United States) Redondo | 6 | 6 | 6
(Indonesia) Kaligis | 7 | 2 | 3
(United States) Newberry | 6 | 6
(United States) Pigeon | 0 | 2
6 | (Australia) Tegart-Dalton | 6 | 6
(Canada) Berner | 0 | 1
(United States) Pande | 6 | 6
(United States) Metcalf | 3 | 3
(United States) Kemmer | 6 | 7
(United States) Graebner | 4 | 6
(United States) Teeguarden | 6 | 2 | 6
(United Kingdom) Molesworth | 4 | 6 | 3
4 | (Australia) Melville | 6 | 6
(Netherlands) Bakker | 3 | 3

Second round
(France) Chanfreau | 6 | 6
(United States) Redondo | 3 | 3
(United States) Newberry | 2 | 4
6 | (Australia) Tegart-Dalton | 6 | 6
(United States) Pande | 6 | 6
(United States) Kemmer | 2 | 4
(United States) Teeguarden | 0 | 3
4 | (Australia) Melville | 6 | 6

Third round
(France) Chanfreau | 2 | 2
6 | (Australia) Tegart-Dalton | 6 | 6
(United States) Pande | 4 | 2
4 | (Australia) Melville | 6 | 6

Quarterfinals
6 | (Australia) Tegart-Dalton | 3 | 5
4 | (Australia) Melville | 6 | 7

==== Section 4 ====
First round
(United Kingdom) Shaw | 6 | 6
(United States) Hansen | 1 | 1
(United Kingdom) Williams | 7 | 7
(United States) Stuart | 6 | 5
(United Kingdom) Truman | 6 | 6
(Canada) O'Hara | 1 | 0
8 | (United States) Heldman | 6 | 6
(United States) Gengler | 4 | 3
(Czechoslovakia) Palmeová-West | 6 | 6
(United States) Moran | 2 | 3
(Australia) Harris | 6 | 6
(United States) Johnson | 3 | 3
(United States) Overton | 6 | 6
(United States) Louie | 3 | 3
2 | (United States) Casals | 6 | 2 | 6
(Netherlands) Stöve | 3 | 6 | 3

Second round
(United Kingdom) Shaw | 4 | 7 | 4
(United Kingdom) Williams | 6 | 6 | 6
(United Kingdom) Truman | 6 | 4 | 1
8 | (United States) Heldman | 2 | 6 | 6
(Czechoslovakia) Palmeová-West | 7 | 6 | 3
(Australia) Harris | 6 | 7 | 6
(United States) Overton | 6 | 3 | 0
2 | (United States) Casals | 2 | 6 | 6

Third round
(United Kingdom) Williams | 7 | 6
8 | (United States) Heldman | 5 | 4
(Australia) Harris | 1 | 1
2 | (United States) Casals | 6 | 6

Quarterfinals
(United Kingdom) Williams | 4 | 6 | 4
2 | (United States) Casals | 6 | 2 | 6

| Preceded by 1971 Wimbledon Championships – Women's singles | Grand Slam women's singles | Succeeded by 1972 Australian Open – Women's singles |
