= 1970 US Open – Women's doubles =

Women's doubles
- 1970 US Open

Final
- Champion: (Australia) Margaret Court (Australia) Judy Dalton
- Runner-up: (United States) Rosemary Casals (United Kingdom) Virginia Wade
- Score: 6–3, 6–4

Events
Singles	men	women		boys	girls
Doubles	men	women	mixed	boys	girls
WC Singles	men	women	quad
WC Doubles	men	women	quad
Legends	men	women	mixed
← 1969 ·	US Open	· 1971 →

Françoise Dürr and Darlene Hard were the defending champions but competed this year with different partners. Françoise Dürr teamed up with Gail Chanfreau, and lost in the semifinals to Margaret Court and Judy Dalton. Darlene Hard teamed up with Peaches Bartkowicz, and lost in the quarterfinals to Françoise Dürr and Gail Chanfreau.

Margaret Court and Judy Dalton won the title by defeating Rosemary Casals and Virginia Wade 6–3, 6–4 in the final.

== Seeds ==
1. (Australia) Margaret Court / (Australia) Judy Dalton (champions)
2. (United States) Rosie Casals / (United Kingdom) Virginia Wade (final)
3. n/a
4. (France) Gail Chanfreau / (France) Françoise Dürr (semifinals)

== Draw ==
=== Key ===
- Q = Qualifier
- WC = Wild card
- LL = Lucky loser
- Alt = Alternate
- SE = Special exempt
- PR = Protected ranking
- ITF = ITF entry
- JE = Junior exempt
- w/o = Walkover
- r = Retired
- d = Defaulted
- SR = Special ranking

=== Finals ===
Semifinals
1	(Australia) Margaret Court (Australia) Judy Dalton	7	6	7
4	(France) Gail Chanfreau (France) Françoise Dürr	6	7	5
(United States) Carole Graebner (Australia) Kerry Melville	2	2
2	(United States) Rosie Casals (United Kingdom) Virginia Wade	6	6

Final
1	(Australia) Margaret Court (Australia) Judy Dalton	6	6
2	(United States) Rosie Casals (United Kingdom) Virginia Wade	3	4

=== Top half ===
First round
1	(Australia) M Court (Australia) J Dalton	6	6
(South Africa) E Emmanuel (United States) C Martinez	2	0
(United States) L Tenney (United States) L Tuero	1	3
(United States) G Hansen (United States) S Walsh	6	6
(United States) J Newberry (United States) E Pande	4	5
(United Kingdom) C Molesworth (United Kingdom) N Truman	6	7
(United States) P Bostrom (United States) F Footman	1	3
(United States) S Johnson (United States) K Kemmer	6	6
4	(France) G Chanfreau (France) F Dürr	6	6	6
(Australia) P Faulkner (United Kingdom) S Holdsworth	7	1	1
(United States) M-A Curtis (United States) V Ziegenfuss	2	6	6
(Indonesia) L Kaligis (Indonesia) L Liem	6	2	3
(Australia) H Gourlay (South Africa) P Walkden	6	3	6
(Australia) L Hunt (United States) K Pigeon	4	6	3
(United States) D Knode (United States) H Parez	2	1
(United States) P Bartkowicz (United States) D Hard	6	6

Second round
1	(Australia) M Court (Australia) J Dalton	6	6
(United States) G Hansen (United States) S Walsh	1	1
(United Kingdom) C Molesworth (United Kingdom) N Truman	4	6	4
(United States) S Johnson (United States) K Kemmer	6	2	6
4	(France) G Chanfreau (France) F Dürr	6	3	7
(United States) M-A Curtis (United States) V Ziegenfuss	3	6	5
(Australia) H Gourlay (South Africa) P Walkden	6	4
(United States) P Bartkowicz (United States) D Hard	7	6

Quarterfinals
1	(Australia) M Court (Australia) J Dalton	6	6
(United States) S Johnson (United States) K Kemmer	0	2
4	(France) G Chanfreau (France) F Dürr	6	3	7
(United States) P Bartkowicz (United States) D Hard	4	6	6

Semifinals
1	(Australia) M Court (Australia) J Dalton	7	6	7
4	(France) G Chanfreau (France) F Dürr	6	7	5

=== Bottom half ===
First round
(United States) D Carter (United States) P Teeguarden	6	6
(United States) L duPont (United States) M Gengler	4	1
(United States) P Austin (United States) M Cooper	1	3
(Australia) K Harris (United States) P Hogan	6	6
(United States) A Lebedeff (United States) T O'Shaughnessy	6	6	6
(United States) S Barman (United States) B Vest	7	4	4
(Japan) C Murakami (Canada) J O'Hara	w/o
(United States) C Capozzi (United States) P Farmer
(Soviet Union) M Kroschina (Soviet Union) O Morozova	7	4	6
(United States) P Reese (United States) S Stap	5	6	4
(Sweden) I Bentzer (Sweden) C Sandberg	6	6
(United States) B-A Hansen (United States) M Johnson	2	2
(United States) P Cody (France) C Spinoza	2	2
2	(United States) R Casals (United Kingdom) V Wade	6	6

Second round
(United States) D Carter (United States) P Teeguarden	6	4	4
(Australia) K Harris (United States) P Hogan	2	6	6
(United States) A Lebedeff (United States) T O'Shaughnessy	1	2
(United States) C Graebner (Australia) K Melville	6	6
(Japan) C Murakami (Canada) J O'Hara	1	5
(Soviet Union) M Kroschina (Soviet Union) O Morozova	6	7
(Sweden) I Bentzer (Sweden) C Sandberg	0	2
2	(United States) R Casals (United Kingdom) V Wade	6	6

Quarterfinals
(Australia) K Harris (United States) P Hogan	3	7	6
(United States) C Graebner (Australia) K Melville	6	5	7
(Soviet Union) M Kroschina (Soviet Union) O Morozova	2	1
2	(United States) R Casals (United Kingdom) V Wade	6	6

Semifinals
(United States) C Graebner (Australia) K Melville	2	2
2	(United States) R Casals (United Kingdom) V Wade	6	6
