= 1970 Wimbledon Championships – Women's doubles =

Women's doubles
- 1970 Wimbledon Championships

Final
- Champions: (United States) Rosie Casals (United States) Billie Jean King
- Runners-up: (France) Françoise Dürr (United Kingdom) Virginia Wade
- Score: 6–2, 6–3

Details
- Draw: 48 (4 Q )
- Seeds: 4

Events
Singles	men	women		boys	girls
Doubles	men	women	mixed	boys	girls
← 1969 ·	Wimbledon Championships	· 1971 →

Margaret Court and Judy Tegart (now playing under the name of Dalton) were the defending champions, but lost in the semifinals to Françoise Dürr and Virginia Wade.

Rosie Casals and Billie Jean King defeated Dürr and Wade in the final, 6–2, 6–3 to win the ladies' doubles tennis title at the 1970 Wimbledon Championships.

== Seeds ==
1. (Australia) Margaret Court / (Australia) Judy Dalton (semifinals)
2. (United States) Rosie Casals / (United States) Billie Jean King (champions)
3. (Australia) Karen Krantzcke / (Australia) Kerry Melville (semifinals)
4. (France) Françoise Dürr / (United Kingdom) Virginia Wade (finals)

Click on the seed number of a player to go to their draw section.

== Draw ==
=== Key ===
- Q = Qualifier
- WC = Wild card
- LL = Lucky loser
- Alt = Alternate
- ITF = ITF entry
- PR = Protected ranking
- SR = Special ranking
- SE = Special exempt
- JE = Junior exempt
- JR = Junior Accelerator Programme entrant
- CO = College Accelerator Programme entrant
- NG = Next Gen Accelerator Program entrant
- w/o = Walkover
- r = Retired
- d = Defaulted

=== Finals ===
Quarterfinals
1	(Australia) Margaret Court (Australia) Judy Dalton	w/o
(Australia) Helen Gourlay (Rhodesia) Pat Walkden
4	(France) Françoise Dürr (United Kingdom) Virginia Wade	6	2	6
(United Kingdom) Winnie Shaw (United Kingdom) Nell Truman	2	6	1
(France) Gail Chanfreau (Australia) Lesley Hunt	8	4
3	(Australia) Karen Krantzcke (Australia) Kerry Melville	10	6
(Japan) Junko Sawamatsu (Japan) Kazuko Sawamatsu	0	4
2	(United States) Rosie Casals (United States) Billie Jean King	6	6

Semifinals
1	(Australia) Margaret Court (Australia) Judy Dalton	4	6	3
4	(France) Françoise Dürr (United Kingdom) Virginia Wade	6	0	6
3	(Australia) Karen Krantzcke (Australia) Kerry Melville	2	6
2	(United States) Rosie Casals (United States) Billie Jean King	6	8

Final
4	(France) Françoise Dürr (United Kingdom) Virginia Wade	2	3
2	(United States) Rosie Casals (United States) Billie Jean King	6	6

=== Top half ===
==== Section 1 ====
First round

Second round
1	(Australia) M Court (Australia) J Dalton	6	6
(Austria) S Pachta (Italy) L Pericoli	0	1
(South Africa) B Kirk (South Africa) W Tomlinson	0	1
(South Africa) A du Plooy (United Kingdom) J Williams	6	6
(Netherlands) B Stöve (Netherlands) G Walhof	6	7
(Australia) A Crooke (France) C Spinoza	1	5
(Chile) M Rodríguez (France) É Terras	0	3
(Australia) H Gourlay (Rhodesia) P Walkden	6	6

Third round
1	(Australia) M Court (Australia) J Dalton	6	5	6
(South Africa) A du Plooy (United Kingdom) J Williams	0	7	3
(Netherlands) B Stöve (Netherlands) G Walhof	2	10
(Australia) H Gourlay (Rhodesia) P Walkden	6	12

Quarterfinals
1	(Australia) M Court (Australia) J Dalton	w/o
(Australia) H Gourlay (Rhodesia) P Walkden

==== Section 2 ====
First round
4	(France) F Dürr (United Kingdom) V Wade	2	6	6
(Australia) K Harris (Australia) F Moore	6	2	4
(Italy) M Giorgi (Italy) A-M Nasuelli	6	6	11
(Czechoslovakia) M Neumannová (Canada) J O'Hara	1	8	9
(United Kingdom) J Cooper (United Kingdom) C Molesworth	1	6	4
(Sweden) I Bentzer (Sweden) C Sandberg	6	4	6
(United Kingdom) A Cowie (United Kingdom) S Holdsworth	6	6
(South Africa) M Brummer (South Africa) L Rossouw	1	4
(Australia) P Edwards (Australia) E Goolagong	6	6
Q	(Australia) S Alexander (Australia) S Walsham	4	3
(Australia) H Amos (Netherlands) J Salomé	6	3	4
(New Zealand) R Legge (New Zealand) M Pryde	3	6	6
(Netherlands) A Bakker (Netherlands) M Schaar	3	0
(United Kingdom) W Shaw (United Kingdom) E Truman	6	6
(West Germany) H Niessen (West Germany) H Orth	4	6	9
(United States) D Carter (United States) P Teeguarden	6	4	7

Second round
4	(France) F Dürr (United Kingdom) V Wade	6	6
(Italy) M Giorgi (Italy) A-M Nasuelli	0	1
(Sweden) I Bentzer (Sweden) C Sandberg	7	6
(United Kingdom) A Cowie (United Kingdom) S Holdsworth	5	3
(Australia) P Edwards (Australia) E Goolagong	6	6
(New Zealand) R Legge (New Zealand) M Pryde	4	2
(United Kingdom) W Shaw (United Kingdom) E Truman	7	6
(West Germany) Helga Niessen (West Germany) H Orth	5	1

Third round
4	(France) F Dürr (United Kingdom) V Wade	6	6
(Sweden) I Bentzer (Sweden) C Sandberg	2	3
(Australia) P Edwards (Australia) E Goolagong	6	6	1
(United Kingdom) W Shaw (United Kingdom) E Truman	1	8	6

Quarterfinals
4	(France) F Dürr (United Kingdom) V Wade	6	2	6
(United Kingdom) W Shaw (United Kingdom) E Truman	2	6	1

=== Bottom half ===
==== Section 3 ====
First round
(United Kingdom) M Greenwood (Brazil) S Petersen	2	4
(France) G Chanfreau (Australia) L Hunt	6	6
(United States) J Bartkowicz (United States) V Ziegenfuss	6	9
(United Kingdom) E Ernest (United Kingdom) J Townsend	4	7
Q	(United Kingdom) W Hall (Australia) B Walsh	1	6
(United States) P Hogan (United States) M Michel	6	8
(United States) G Hansen (United States) S Walsh	3	6	6
(United States) S Johnson (United States) W Overton	6	4	3
(United States) M-A Curtis (United States) J Heldman	6	6
(South Africa) J Drysdale (South Africa) H Segal	0	1
(Argentina) AM Arias (Uruguay) F Bonicelli	9	6
Q	(Australia) A Avis (Australia) F Luff	7	3
(South Africa) E Emmanuel (United States) C Martinez	4	6
(United States) K Harter (United States) K Pigeon	6	8
(Czechoslovakia) A Palmeová (Czechoslovakia) V Vopičková	0	1
3	(Australia) K Krantzcke (Australia) K Melville	6	6

Second round
(France) G Chanfreau (Australia) L Hunt	6	2	6
(United States) J Bartkowicz (United States) V Ziegenfuss	2	6	1
(United States) P Hogan (United States) M Michel	6	6
(United States) G Hansen (United States) S Walsh	3	1
(United States) M-A Curtis (United States) J Heldman	6	6
(Argentina) AM Arias (Uruguay) F Bonicelli	1	1
(United States) K Harter (United States) K Pigeon	1	4
3	(Australia) K Krantzcke (Australia) K Melville	6	6

Third round
(France) G Chanfreau (Australia) L Hunt	6	7	6
(United States) P Hogan (United States) M Michel	3	9	1
(United States) M-A Curtis (United States) J Heldman	2	2
3	(Australia) K Krantzcke (Australia) K Melville	6	6

Quarterfinals
(France) G Chanfreau (Australia) L Hunt	8	4
3	(Australia) K Krantzcke (Australia) K Melville	10	6

==== Section 4 ====
First round

Second round
(Spain) AM Estalella (Spain) C Mandarino	6	6
Q	(Australia) H Kayser (Australia) H Sheedy	4	1
(United Kingdom) R Bentley (United Kingdom) R Lloyd	4	6	1
(Japan) J Sawamatsu (Japan) K Sawamatsu	6	1	6
(United Kingdom) L Beaven (United Kingdom) S Brasher	6	6	3
(Soviet Union) E Isopaitis (Soviet Union) O Morozova	8	3	6
(Indonesia) L Kaligis (Indonesia) L Liem	4	1
2	(United States) R Casals (United States) BJ King	6	6

Third round
(Spain) AM Estalella (Spain) C Mandarino	2	6	6
(Japan) J Sawamatsu (Japan) K Sawamatsu	6	3	8
(Soviet Union) E Isopaitis (Soviet Union) O Morozova	2	4
2	(United States) R Casals (United States) BJ King	6	6

Final
(Japan) J Sawamatsu (Japan) K Sawamatsu	0	4
2	(United States) R Casals (United States) BJ King	6	6
