= 1969 Australian Open – Women's singles =

Tennis tournament held in 1969

Women's singles
- 1969 Australian Open

Final
- Champion: (Australia) Margaret Court
- Runner-up: (United States) Billie Jean King
- Score: 6–4, 6–1

Details
- Draw: 32
- Seeds: 10

Events
Singles	men	women		boys	girls
Doubles	men	women	mixed	boys	girls
- Australian Open

Margaret Court defeated defending champion Billie Jean King in the final, 6–4, 6–1 to win the women's singles tennis title at the 1969 Australian Open. It was her eighth Australian Open title and 14th major title overall. This was the first edition of the Australian Open to be open to professional players, marking a period in tennis history known as the Open Era.

== Seeds ==
1. (United States) Billie Jean King (final)
2. (Australia) Margaret Court (champion)
3. (United Kingdom) Ann Jones (semifinals)
4. (Australia) Kerry Melville (semifinals)
5. (United States) Rosie Casals (quarterfinals)
6. (Australia) Karen Krantzcke (quarterfinals)
7. (Australia) Lesley Hunt (quarterfinals)
8. (Australia) Judy Tegart-Dalton (first round)
9. (Australia) Lesley Turner Bowrey (second round)
10. (France) Françoise Dürr (second round)

== Draw ==
Key

- Q = Qualifier
- WC = Wild card
- LL = Lucky loser
- Alt = Alternate
- ITF = ITF entry
- PR = Protected ranking
- SR = Special ranking
- SE = Special exempt
- JE = Junior exempt
- JR = Junior Accelerator Programme entrant
- CO = College Accelerator Programme entrant
- NG = Next Gen Accelerator Program entrant
- w/o = Walkover
- r = Retired
- d = Defaulted

=== Finals ===
Semifinals
1	(United States) Billie Jean King	4	6	6
3	(United Kingdom) Ann Jones	6	2	3
4	(Australia) Kerry Melville	6	2	5
2	(Australia) Margaret Court	3	6	7

Final
1	(United States) Billie Jean King	4	1
2	(Australia) Margaret Court	6	6

==== Section 1 ====
First round
1	(United States) BJ King	6	6
(Australia) F Luff	1	3
(Australia) E Goolagong	6	6
(Australia) H Kayser	3	1
6	(Australia) K Krantzcke	6	6
(Australia) L Kenny	1	2
(Australia) H Sheedy	7	6
(Indonesia) L Kaligis	5	2
3	(United Kingdom) A Jones	6	6
(Australia) P Edwards	0	2
(Australia) B Hawcroft	3	4
(Australia) K Harris	6	6
7	(Australia) L Hunt	6	6
(Australia) J Whyte	2	2
(Australia) W Gilchrist	3	5
9	(Australia) L Bowrey	6	7

Second round
1	(United States) BJ King	6	6
(Australia) E Goolagong	3	1
6	(Australia) K Krantzcke	6	6
(Australia) H Sheedy	0	1
3	(United Kingdom) A Jones	9	6
(Australia) K Harris	7	1
7	(Australia) L Hunt
9	(Australia) L Bowrey	w/o

Quarterfinals
1	(United States) BJ King	11	7
6	(Australia) K Krantzcke	9	5
3	(United Kingdom) A Jones	6	6
7	(Australia) L Hunt	3	1

Semifinals
1	(United States) BJ King	4	6	6
3	(United Kingdom) A Jones	6	2	3

==== Section 2 ====
First round
10	(France) F Dürr	7	7
(Australia) H Rush	5	5
(Australia) H Gourlay	2	7	6
8	(Australia) J Tegart	6	5	3
(Australia) K Treasure	4	2
(Australia) M Starr	6	6
(Indonesia) L Liem	2	4
4	(Australia) K Melville	6	6
(Australia) J Young	6	6
(Australia) K Wilkinson	2	1
(France) G Chanfreau	6	2	2
5	(United States) R Casals	4	6	6
(Australia) P Brand	3	6	5
(Australia) H Amos	6	4	7
(Australia) J Gohl	0	0
2	(Australia) M Court	6	6

Second round
10	(France) F Dürr	6	4	0
(Australia) H Gourlay	4	6	6
(Australia) M Starr	1	1
4	(Australia) K Melville	6	6
(Australia) J Young	3	3
5	(United States) R Casals	6	6
(Australia) H Amos	0	2
2	(Australia) M Court	6	6

Quarterfinals
(Australia) H Gourlay	6	4	6
4	(Australia) K Melville	3	6	4
5	(United States) R Casals	4	1
2	(Australia) M Court	6	6

Semifinals
4	(Australia) K Melville	6	2	5
2	(Australia) M Court	3	6	7

Preceded by 1968 US Open – Women's singles	Grand Slam women's singles	Succeeded by 1969 French Open – Women's singles
