= 1969 Australian Open – Mixed doubles =

Mixed doubles
- 1969 Australian Open

Final
- Champions: (Australia) Margaret Court (United States) Marty Riessen (United Kingdom) Ann Jones (Australia) Fred Stolle
- Runners-up: none
- Score: none

Details
- Draw: 16
- Seeds: 4

Events
Singles	men	women		boys	girls
Doubles	men	women	mixed	boys	girls
- Australian Open

Margaret Court and Marty Riessen were meant to play Ann Jones and Fred Stolle in the final to win the mixed doubles title at the 1969 Australian Open, but the final was never played. As such, the title was shared.
This would be the last mixed doubles competition held in the Australian Open tournament until the 1987.

== Seeds ==
1. (Australia) Margaret Court / (United States) Marty Riessen (final)
2. (United Kingdom) Ann Jones / (Australia) Fred Stolle (final)
3. (United States) Rosie Casals / (Australia) Tony Roche (semifinals)
4. (United States) Billie Jean King / (United Kingdom) Roger Taylor (semifinals)

== Draw ==
Key

- Q = Qualifier
- WC = Wild card
- LL = Lucky loser
- Alt = Alternate
- ITF = ITF entry
- PR = Protected ranking
- SR = Special ranking
- SE = Special exempt
- JE = Junior exempt
- JR = Junior Accelerator Programme entrant
- CO = College Accelerator Programme entrant
- NG = Next Gen Accelerator Program entrant
- w/o = Walkover
- r = Retired
- d = Defaulted

=== Finals ===
Semifinals
1	(Australia) Margaret Court (United States) Marty Riessen	7	6
4	(United States) Billie Jean King (United Kingdom) Roger Taylor	5	3
3	(United States) Rosie Casals (Australia) Tony Roche	5	6	3
2	(United Kingdom) Ann Jones (Australia) Fred Stolle	7	1	6

Final
1	(Australia) Margaret Court (United States) Marty Riessen
2	(United Kingdom) Ann Jones (Australia) Fred Stolle

=== Full draw ===
First round
1	(Australia) M Court (United States) M Riessen	6	6
(France) G Chanfreau (France) J-B Chanfreau	0	3
(Australia) J Tegart (Australia) R Keldie	w/o
(Australia) K Melville (Soviet Union) T Leius
(Australia) K Harris (South Africa) R Moore	w/o
(Australia) L Bowrey (Australia) M Anderson
(Australia) H Amos (Australia) B Giltinan	1	2
4	(United States) BJ King (United Kingdom) R Taylor	6	6
3	(United States) R Casals (Australia) T Roche	w/o
(Australia) R Brent (Australia) L Kenny
(Australia) L Hunt (Australia) T Addison	8	7
(France) F Dürr (United States) P Gonzales	6	5
(Australia) K Krantzcke (Australia) R Ruffels	w/o
(Australia) H Gourlay (Australia) D Crealy
(Australia) P Brand (Australia) H Hunt	4	2
2	(United Kingdom) A Jones (Australia) F Stolle	6	6

Quarterfinals
1	(Australia) M Court (United States) M Riessen	w/o
(Australia) J Tegart (Australia) R Keldie
(Australia) K Harris (South Africa) R Moore	3	2
4	(United States) BJ King (United Kingdom) R Taylor	6	6
3	(United States) R Casals (Australia) T Roche	3	7	6
(Australia) L Hunt (Australia) T Addison	6	5	1
(Australia) K Krantzcke (Australia) R Ruffels	6	2	4
2	(United Kingdom) A Jones (Australia) F Stolle	2	6	6

Semifinals
1	(Australia) M Court (United States) M Riessen	7	6
4	(United States) BJ King (United Kingdom) R Taylor	5	3
3	(United States) R Casals (Australia) T Roche	5	6	3
2	(United Kingdom) A Jones (Australia) F Stolle	7	1	6

Final
1	(Australia) M Court (United States) M Riessen
2	(United Kingdom) A Jones (Australia) F Stolle
