= 1969 Australian Open – Women's doubles =

Women's doubles
- 1969 Australian Open

Final
- Champions: (Australia) Margaret Court (Australia) Judy Tegart-Dalton
- Runners-up: (United States) Rosie Casals (United States) Billie Jean King
- Score: 6–4, 6–4

Details
- Draw: 16
- Seeds: 4

Events
| Singles | men | women | | boys | girls |
| Doubles | men | women | mixed | boys | girls |
- Australian Open

Margaret Court and Judy Tegart-Dalton defeated Rosie Casals and Billie Jean King 6–4, 6–4 in the final to win the women's doubles title at the 1969 Australian Open.

== Seeds ==
1. (United States) Rosie Casals / (United States) Billie Jean King (final)
2. (Australia) Margaret Court / (Australia) Judy Tegart-Dalton (champions)
3. (Australia) Karen Krantzcke / (Australia) Kerry Melville (semifinals)
4. (France) Françoise Dürr / (United Kingdom) Ann Jones (semifinals)

== Draw ==
Key

- Q = Qualifier
- WC = Wild card
- LL = Lucky loser
- Alt = Alternate
- ITF = ITF entry
- PR = Protected ranking
- SR = Special ranking
- SE = Special exempt
- JE = Junior exempt
- JR = Junior Accelerator Programme entrant
- CO = College Accelerator Programme entrant
- NG = Next Gen Accelerator Program entrant
- w/o = Walkover
- r = Retired
- d = Defaulted

=== Full draw ===
First round
1 | (United States) R Casals (United States) BJ King | w/o
(Australia) H Amos (Australia) J Gohl
(Australia) P Billing (Australia) L Butterfield | 1 | 3
(France) G Chanfreau (Australia) L Hunt | 6 | 6
(Chinese Taipei) Cho S-r (Japan) K Hatanaka | 7 | 3
(Australia) L Mansfield (Australia) H Sheedy | 9 | 6
(Australia) H Kayser (Australia) F Luff | 0 | 2
3 | (Australia) K Krantzcke (Australia) K Melville | 6 | 6
4 | (France) F Dürr (United Kingdom) A Jones | 6 | 6
(Indonesia) L Kaligis (Indonesia) L Liem | 4 | 4
(Australia) W Gilchrist (Australia) K Harris | 6 | 6
(Australia) P Brand (Australia) K Treasure | 1 | 2
(Australia) L Kenny (Australia) M Starr | w/o
(Australia) L Bowrey (Australia) H Gourlay
(Australia) S Hole (Australia) K Wilkinson | 1 | 1
2 | (Australia) M Court (Australia) J Tegart | 6 | 6

Quarterfinals
1 | (United States) R Casals (United States) BJ King | 8 | 6
(France) G Chanfreau (Australia) L Hunt | 6 | 1
(Australia) L Mansfield (Australia) H Sheedy | 1 | 5
3 | (Australia) K Krantzcke (Australia) K Melville | 6 | 7
4 | (France) F Dürr (United Kingdom) A Jones | 6 | 6
(Australia) W Gilchrist (Australia) K Harris | 2 | 0
(Australia) L Kenny (Australia) M Starr | 2 | 1
2 | (Australia) M Court (Australia) J Tegart | 6 | 6

Semifinals
1 | (United States) R Casals (United States) BJ King | 6 | 6
3 | (Australia) K Krantzcke (Australia) K Melville | 3 | 4
4 | (France) F Dürr (United Kingdom) A Jones | 4 | 5
2 | (Australia) M Court (Australia) J Tegart | 6 | 7

Final
1 | (United States) R Casals (United States) BJ King | 4 | 4
2 | (Australia) M Court (Australia) J Tegart | 6 | 6
