= 1969 Australian Open – Men's singles =

Men's singles
- 1969 Australian Open

Final
- Champion: (Australia) Rod Laver
- Runner-up: (Spain) Andrés Gimeno
- Score: 6–3, 6–4, 7–5

Details
- Draw: 48
- Seeds: 16

Events
Singles	men	women		boys	girls
Doubles	men	women	mixed	boys	girls
- Australian Open

Rod Laver defeated Andrés Gimeno in the final, 6–3, 6–4, 7–5 to win the men's singles tennis title at the 1969 Australian Open. It was his eighth Grand Slam tournament singles title, and the first step in an eventual Grand Slam for Laver. This was the first edition of the Australian Open to be open to professional players, marking a period in tennis history known as the Open Era.

Bill Bowrey was the defending champion, but lost in the quarterfinals to Ray Ruffels.

== Seeds ==
The seeded players are listed below. Rod Laver is the champion; others show the round in which they were eliminated.

1. (Australia) Rod Laver (champion)
2. (Australia) Ken Rosewall (third round)
3. (Netherlands) Tom Okker (first round)
4. (Australia) Tony Roche (semifinals)
5. (Australia) John Newcombe (quarterfinals)
6. (United States) Pancho Gonzales (third round)
7. (Australia) Fred Stolle (quarterfinals)
8. (United States) Marty Riessen (third round)
9. (Spain) Andrés Gimeno (final)
10. (Australia) Bill Bowrey (quarterfinals)
11. (Australia) Roy Emerson (third round)
12. (Australia) Ray Ruffels (semifinals)
13. (United States) Butch Buchholz (quarterfinals)
14. (Australia) Mal Anderson (third round)
15. (United Kingdom) Roger Taylor (second round)
16. (Australia) Allan Stone (third round)

== Draw ==
Key

- Q = Qualifier
- WC = Wild card
- LL = Lucky loser
- Alt = Alternate
- ITF = ITF entry
- PR = Protected ranking
- SR = Special ranking
- SE = Special exempt
- JE = Junior exempt
- JR = Junior Accelerator Programme entrant
- CO = College Accelerator Programme entrant
- NG = Next Gen Accelerator Program entrant
- w/o = Walkover
- r = Retired
- d = Defaulted

=== Final eight ===
Quarterfinals
1	(Australia) Rod Laver	6	18	6
7	(Australia) Fred Stolle	4	16	4
5	(Australia) John Newcombe	8	6	8	5	3
4	(Australia) Tony Roche	10	4	6	7	6
12	(Australia) Ray Ruffels	9	2	6	6	6
10	(Australia) Bill Bowrey	11	6	0	3	4
13	(United States) Butch Buchholz	1	2	2
9	(Spain) Andrés Gimeno	6	6	6

Semifinals
1	(Australia) Rod Laver	7	22	9	1	6
4	(Australia) Tony Roche	5	20	11	6	3
12	(Australia) Ray Ruffels	2	9	2
9	(Spain) Andrés Gimeno	6	11	6

Final
1	(Australia) Rod Laver	6	6	7
9	(Spain) Andrés Gimeno	3	4	5

=== Section 1 ===
First round

Second round
1	(Australia) R Laver	6	6	6
(Italy) M Di Domenico	2	2	3
(Australia) H Hunt	1	3	3
11	(Australia) R Emerson	6	6	6
16	(Australia) A Stone	6	11	6
(France) J-L Rouyer	1	9	4
(Australia) R Case	5	4	2
7	(Australia) F Stolle	7	6	6

Third round
1	(Australia) R Laver	6	6	3	9
11	(Australia) R Emerson	2	4	6	7
16	(Australia) A Stone	6	4	2
7	(Australia) F Stolle	8	6	6

Quarterfinals
1	(Australia) R Laver	6	18	6
7	(Australia) F Stolle	4	16	4

=== Section 2 ===
First round
5	(Australia) J Newcombe	6	5	6	6
(Australia) I Fletcher	2	7	3	4
(Australia) R Brent	6	6	4	8	6
(France) JB Chanfreau	3	8	6	6	4
(South Africa) R Moore	6	4	6	4	6
(South Africa) T Fancutt	4	6	3	6	1
(Italy) V Crotta	6	4	3	4
15	(United Kingdom) R Taylor	4	6	6	6
14	(Australia) M Anderson	9	6	6
(Australia) J Bartlett	7	2	3
(Australia) D Crealy	8	7	2	10
(Australia) A Hammond	6	5	6	8
(Australia) R Keldie	6	13
(Australia) S Ball	1	11	r
(Australia) B Phillips-Moore	3	3	4
4	(Australia) T Roche	6	6	6

Second round
5	(Australia) J Newcombe	6	7	3	6
(Australia) R Brent	2	5	6	4
(South Africa) R Moore	15	13	0	6
15	(United Kingdom) R Taylor	13	11	6	4
14	(Australia) M Anderson	6	12	6
(Australia) D Crealy	2	10	1
(Australia) R Keldie	6	0	4
4	(Australia) T Roche	8	6	6

Third round
5	(Australia) J Newcombe	6	6	6
(South Africa) R Moore	2	4	3
14	(Australia) M Anderson	6	3	4
4	(Australia) T Roche	8	6	6

Quarterfinals
5	(Australia) J Newcombe	8	6	8	5	3
4	(Australia) T Roche	10	4	6	7	6

=== Section 3 ===
First round
3	(Netherlands) T Okker
(Italy) P Marzano	w/o
(Australia) J Brown	7	12	4	3
(Soviet Union) T Leius	9	10	6	6
(Australia) A Gardiner	4	4	4
(Australia) J Alexander	6	6	6
(Indonesia) S Sugiarto	1	0	2
12	(Australia) R Ruffels	6	6	6
10	(Australia) B Bowrey	8	6	6
(Japan) K Watanabe	6	4	3
(Italy) A Panatta	0	5	1
(Australia) T Addison	6	7	6
(Australia) B Giltinan	0	2	4
(France) P Barthès	6	6	6
(Belgium) M Bolle	2	2	4
6	(United States) P Gonzales	6	6	6

Second round
(Italy) P Marzano	4	1	2
(Soviet Union) T Leius	6	6	6
(Australia) J Alexander	2	8	4
12	(Australia) R Ruffels	6	10	6
10	(Australia) B Bowrey	5	6	6	6
(Australia) T Addison	7	2	2	4
(France) P Barthès	3	3	3
6	(United States) P Gonzales	6	6	6

Third round
(Soviet Union) T Leius	2	1	3
12	(Australia) R Ruffels	6	6	6
10	(Australia) B Bowrey	6	6	11
6	(United States) P Gonzales	3	0	9

Quarterfinals
12	(Australia) R Ruffels	9	2	6	6	6
10	(Australia) B Bowrey	11	6	0	3	4

=== Section 4 ===
First round

Second round
8	(United States) M Riessen	6	6	6
(Italy) P Toci	1	2	1
(Australia) J Cooper	3	6	2	2
13	(United States) B Buchholz	6	3	6	6
9	(Spain) A Gimeno	6	6	6
(Australia) G Masters	1	2	2
(Australia) P Dent	6	2	1	4
2	(Australia) K Rosewall	3	6	6	6

Third round
8	(United States) M Riessen	6	6	5	1	4
13	(United States) B Buchholz	1	4	7	6	6
9	(Spain) A Gimeno	7	6	6
2	(Australia) K Rosewall	5	1	4

Quarterfinals
13	(United States) B Buchholz	1	2	2
9	(Spain) A Gimeno	6	6	6

Preceded by 1968 US Open – Men's singles	Grand Slam men's singles	Succeeded by 1969 French Open – Men's singles
