= 1970 French Open – Women's singles qualifying =

Women's singles qualifying
- 1970 French Open

Events
Singles	men	women		boys	girls
Doubles	men	women	mixed	boys	girls
WC Singles	men	women	quad
WC Doubles	men	women	quad
Legends	−45	45+	women
← 1969 ·	French Open	· 1971 →

Players who neither had high enough rankings nor received wild cards to enter the main draw of the annual French Open Tennis Championships participated in a qualifying tournament held in the week before the event.

== Qualifiers ==
1. (Argentina) Ana María Arias
2. (West Germany) Edith Winkens
3. (Australia) Helen Amos
4. (Uruguay) Fiorella Bonicelli
5. (Netherlands) Judith Salomé
6. (United States) Pam Teeguarden
7. (South Africa) Janine Lieffrig
8. (United States) Wendy Overton

== Qualifying draw ==
=== Key ===
- Q = Qualifier
- WC = Wild card
- LL = Lucky loser
- Alt = Alternate
- ITF = ITF entry
- PR = Protected ranking
- SR = Special ranking
- SE = Special exempt
- JE = Junior exempt
- JR = Junior Accelerator Programme entrant
- CO = College Accelerator Programme entrant
- NG = Next Gen Accelerator Program entrant
- w/o = Walkover
- r = Retired
- d = Defaulted

=== First qualifier ===
First round

Second round
(Argentina) Ana María Arias	5	15	6
(France) Michele Mizen	7	13	1
(Switzerland) Rita Felix	w/o
(France) Nicole Cazaux

Qualifying competition
(Argentina) Ana María Arias	7	6
(France) Nicole Cazaux	5	2

=== Second qualifier ===
First round
2	(West Germany) Edith Winkens	6	6
7	(Canada) Stephanie Bardsley	1	4

Second round
(Japan) Junko Sawamatsu	7	4
(France) Anne-Marie Rouchon	9	6
(West Germany) Edith Winkens	6	6
(France) Chantal Langanay	2	3

Qualifying competition
(France) Anne-Marie Rouchon	2	2
(West Germany) Edith Winkens	6	6

=== Third qualifier ===
First round
1	(Australia) Helen Amos	6	6	6
8	(France) Jacqueline Le Boubenec	1	8	2
4	(Ecuador) María Eugenia Guzmán	6	6
5	(France) Jacqueline Berson	2	1
2	(Brazil) Suzana Petersen	6	6
7	(France) Johanne Venturino	1	4
3	(Portugal) Leonora Santos	2	2
6	(France) Anne-Marie Cassaigne	6	6

Second round
(Australia) Helen Amos	3	6	6
(Ecuador) María Eugenia Guzmán	6	4	2
(Brazil) Suzana Petersen	6	6
(France) Anne-Marie Cassaigne	0	1

Qualifying competition
(Australia) Helen Amos	6	6
(Brazil) Suzana Petersen	4	3

=== Fourth qualifier ===
First round
2	(Uruguay) Fiorella Bonicelli	6	6
7	(France) Nathalie Fuchs	2	0

Second round
(France) Danièle Bouteleux	6	6
(France) Sylvie Pruvot	1	2
(Uruguay) Fiorella Bonicelli	6	7
(France) Aline Nenot	2	5

Qualifying competition
(France) Danièle Bouteleux	3	4
(Uruguay) Fiorella Bonicelli	6	6

=== Fifth qualifier ===
First round
1	(West Germany) Edda Buding	6	5	6
8	(Australia) Adrienne Avis	4	7	2

Second round
(West Germany) Edda Buding	8	6
(France) Nicole Niox-Château	6	3
(Netherlands) Judith Salomé	6	6
(France) Maylis Burel	4	3

Qualifying competition
(West Germany) Edda Buding	2	7
(Netherlands) Judith Salomé	6	9

=== Sixth qualifier ===
First round
4	(Australia) Frances Luff	1	0
5	(France) Claudine Rouire	6	6
2	(United States) Pam Teeguarden	6	6
7	(France) Irène Isse	4	3

Second round
(Japan) Chikako Murakami	3	2
(France) Claudine Rouire	6	6
(United States) Pam Teeguarden	6	6
(France) Françoise Repoux	1	2

Qualifying competition
(France) Claudine Rouire	4	4
(United States) Pam Teeguarden	6	6

=== Seventh qualifier ===
First round

Second round
(Sweden) Madeleine Pegel	4	2
(Chile) Michelle Rodríguez	6	6
(Italy) Daniela Porzio	11	3	1
(South Africa) Janine Lieffrig	9	6	6

Qualifying competition
(Chile) Michelle Rodríguez	2	3
(South Africa) Janine Lieffrig	6	6

=== Eighth qualifier ===
First round

Second round
(Indonesia) Lany Kaligis	1	4
(Italy) Anna-Maria Nasuelli	6	6
(United States) Wendy Overton
(Switzerland) Anne-Marie Studer	w/o

Qualifying competition
(Italy) Anna-Maria Nasuelli	2	2
(United States) Wendy Overton	6	6
