= 1969 Australian Open – Men's doubles =

Men's doubles
- 1969 Australian Open

Final
- Champions: (Australia) Rod Laver (Australia) Roy Emerson
- Runners-up: (Australia) Ken Rosewall (Australia) Fred Stolle
- Score: 6–4, 6–4

Details
- Draw: 24
- Seeds: 8

Events
Singles	men	women		boys	girls
Doubles	men	women	mixed	boys	girls
- Australian Open

Rod Laver and Roy Emerson defeated Ken Rosewall and Fred Stolle 6–4, 6–4 in the final to win the men's doubles title at the 1969 Australian Open. Dick Crealy and Allan Stone were the defending champions but lost in the Quarterfinals to Laver and Emerson.

== Seeds ==
1. (Australia) John Newcombe / (Australia) Tony Roche (semifinals)
2. (Australia) Ken Rosewall / (Australia) Fred Stolle (final)
3. (Australia) Rod Laver / (Australia) Roy Emerson (champions)
4. (South Africa) Raymond Moore / (United States) Marty Riessen (semifinals)
5. (Spain) Andrés Gimeno / (United States) Richard Pancho Gonzales (second round)
6. (Australia) Mal Anderson / (United Kingdom) Roger Taylor (second round)
7. (Australia) Dick Crealy / (Australia) Allan Stone (quarterfinals)
8. (Australia) Terry Addison / (Australia) Ray Keldie (quarterfinals)

== Draw ==
Key

- Q = Qualifier
- WC = Wild card
- LL = Lucky loser
- Alt = Alternate
- ITF = ITF entry
- PR = Protected ranking
- SR = Special ranking
- SE = Special exempt
- JE = Junior exempt
- JR = Junior Accelerator Programme entrant
- CO = College Accelerator Programme entrant
- NG = Next Gen Accelerator Program entrant
- w/o = Walkover
- r = Retired
- d = Defaulted

=== Finals ===
Semifinals
1	(Australia) John Newcombe (Australia) Tony Roche	2	6	3	4
3	(Australia) Rod Laver (Australia) Roy Emerson	6	1	6	6
4	(South Africa) Raymond Moore (United States) Marty Riessen	3	3	6	6	8
2	(Australia) Ken Rosewall (Australia) Fred Stolle	6	6	4	3	10

Final
3	(Australia) Rod Laver (Australia) Roy Emerson	6	6
2	(Australia) Ken Rosewall (Australia) Fred Stolle	4	4

=== Section 1 ===
First round
3	(Australia) R Laver (Australia) R Emerson	6	6	7
(Belgium) M Bolle (France) J-L Rouyer	3	3	5
(Australia) M Guse (Australia) G Olsson	8	4	6	11
(Australia) R Case (Australia) A Gardiner	6	6	4	9
(Italy) M Di Domenico (Italy) A Panatta	6	3	6	7
(Japan) J Kawamori (Japan) K Watanabe	3	6	1	5
(France) J-B Chanfreau (Italy) P Toci	4	4	0
7	(Australia) D Crealy (Australia) A Stone	6	6	6

Second round
1	(Australia) J Newcombe (Australia) T Roche	6	6	12
(Australia) J Alexander (Australia) P Dent	4	4	10
(Australia) J Bartlett (South Africa) T Fancutt	3	6	9	3
8	(Australia) T Addison (Australia) R Keldie	6	3	11	6
3	(Australia) R Laver (Australia) R Emerson	6	6	6
(Australia) M Guse (Australia) G Olsson	1	3	0
(Italy) M Di Domenico (Italy) A Panatta	6	3	2	6	4
7	(Australia) D Crealy (Australia) A Stone	4	6	6	3	6

Quarterfinals
1	(Australia) J Newcombe (Australia) T Roche	6	7	5	6	6
8	(Australia) T Addison (Australia) R Keldie	2	5	7	8	3
3	(Australia) R Laver (Australia) R Emerson	6	12	6
7	(Australia) D Crealy (Australia) A Stone	3	10	2

Semifinals
1	(Australia) J Newcombe (Australia) T Roche	2	6	3	4
3	(Australia) R Laver (Australia) R Emerson	6	1	6	6

=== Section 2 ===
First round
6	(Australia) M Anderson (United Kingdom) R Taylor	5	6	6	6
(France) P Barthès (United States) B Buchholz	7	3	2	4
(Australia) B Bowrey (Australia) R Ruffels	4	4	6	6	6
(Australia) S Ball (Australia) B Giltinan	6	6	4	1	4
(Australia) R Brent (Australia) B Phillips-Moore	6	6	6
(Australia) J Cooper (Australia) A Hammond	4	4	4
(Italy) V Crotta (Italy) P Marzano	1	1	3
4	(South Africa) R Moore (United States) M Riessen	6	6	6

Second round
6	(Australia) M Anderson (United Kingdom) R Taylor	1	6	4	2
(Australia) B Bowrey (Australia) R Ruffels	6	1	6	6
(Australia) R Brent (Australia) B Phillips-Moore	5	4	3
4	(South Africa) R Moore (United States) M Riessen	7	6	6
5	(Spain) A Gimeno (Australia) H Hunt	2	4	4
(Australia) J Brown (Soviet Union) T Leius	6	6	6
(Australia) I Fletcher (Australia) A Wall	1	1	2
2	(Australia) K Rosewall (Australia) F Stolle	6	6	6

Quarterfinals
(Australia) B Bowrey (Australia) R Ruffels	4	4	2
4	(South Africa) R Moore (United States) M Riessen	6	6	6
(Australia) J Brown (Soviet Union) T Leius	4	2	0
2	(Australia) K Rosewall (Australia) F Stolle	6	6	6

Semifinals
4	(South Africa) R Moore (United States) M Riessen	3	3	6	6	8
2	(Australia) K Rosewall (Australia) F Stolle	6	6	4	3	10
