= 1971 US Open – Men's doubles =

Men's doubles
- 1971 US Open

Final
- Champions: (Australia) John Newcombe (United Kingdom) Roger Taylor
- Runners-up: (United States) Stan Smith (United States) Erik van Dillen
- Score: 6–7, 6–3, 7–6, 4–6, [5-3]

Details
- Draw: 64
- Seeds: 8

Events
Singles	men	women		boys	girls
Doubles	men	women	mixed	boys	girls
WC Singles	men	women	quad
WC Doubles	men	women	quad
Legends	men	women	mixed
← 1970 ·	US Open	· 1972 →

Pierre Barthès and Nikola Pilić were the defending US Open men's doubles tennis champions, but did not defend their title as a team.

Seventh-seeded John Newcombe and Roger Taylor won the title by defeating sixth-seeded Stan Smith and Erik van Dillen 6–7, 6–3, 7–6, 4–6, [5-3] in the final.

== Seeds ==
1. (United States) Arthur Ashe / (United States) Dennis Ralston (third round, withdrew)
2. (Netherlands) Tom Okker / (United States) Marty Riessen (semifinals)
3. (Romania) Ilie Năstase / (Romania) Ion Țiriac (quarterfinals)
4. (Australia) Bill Bowrey / (Australia) Owen Davidson (quarterfinals)
5. (South Africa) Bob Hewitt / (South Africa) Frew McMillan (semifinals, retired)
6. (United States) Stan Smith / (United States) Erik van Dillen (final)
7. (Australia) John Newcombe / (United Kingdom) Roger Taylor (champions)
8. (Australia) John Alexander / (Australia) Phil Dent (third round)

== Draw ==
=== Key ===
- Q = Qualifier
- WC = Wild card
- LL = Lucky loser
- Alt = Alternate
- ITF = ITF entry
- PR = Protected ranking
- SR = Special ranking
- SE = Special exempt
- JE = Junior exempt
- JR = Junior Accelerator Programme entrant
- CO = College Accelerator Programme entrant
- NG = Next Gen Accelerator Program entrant
- w/o = Walkover
- r = Retired
- d = Defaulted

=== Finals ===
Quarterfinals
(Czechoslovakia) Milan Holeček (New Zealand) Onny Parun	0	3	6
7	(Australia) John Newcombe (United Kingdom) Roger Taylor	6	6	7
3	(Romania) Ilie Năstase (Romania) Ion Țiriac	7	6	3	7	3
5	(South Africa) Bob Hewitt (South Africa) Frew McMillan	5	7	6	5	6
6	(United States) Stan Smith (United States) Erik van Dillen	6	7	6
4	(Australia) Bill Bowrey (Australia) Owen Davidson	4	6	3
(United States) Jeff Borowiak (Pakistan) Haroon Rahim	3	4	1
2	(Netherlands) Tom Okker (United States) Marty Riessen	6	6	6

Semifinals
7	(Australia) John Newcombe (United Kingdom) Roger Taylor	7	6
5	(South Africa) Bob Hewitt (South Africa) Frew McMillan	6	1^{r}
6	(United States) Stan Smith (United States) Erik van Dillen	6	6	6
2	(Netherlands) Tom Okker (United States) Marty Riessen	4	2	2

Final
7	(Australia) John Newcombe (United Kingdom) Roger Taylor	6	6	7	4	[5]
6	(United States) Stan Smith (United States) Erik van Dillen	7	3	6	6	[3]

=== Top half ===
==== Section 1 ====
First round
1	(United States) A Ashe (United States) D Ralston	6	3	6	6
(United Kingdom) J Clifton (United Kingdom) J Paish	0	6	4	2
(United States) M Fishbach (United States) P Fishbach	6	6	4	7
(United States) B Brown (United States) T Ward	3	4	6	6
(United States) V Gerulaitis (United States) E Scott	7	3	6	3	6
(Czechoslovakia) F Pála (Czechoslovakia) V Zedník	6	6	0	6	3
(Czechoslovakia) M Holeček (New Zealand) O Parun	4	6	7	7
(Chile) P Cornejo (Chile) J Fillol	6	4	6	5
7	(Australia) J Newcombe (United Kingdom) R Taylor	6	7	6
(Argentina) E Álvarez (Argentina) T Vázquez	3	6	2
Alt	(Canada) P Burwash (South Africa) P Cramer	2	1	4
(United States) T Leonard (Socialist Federal Republic of Yugoslavia) N Pilić	6	6	6
(United States) B Lutz (United States) C Pasarell	6	6	6
(United States) J Parker (United States) L Parker	3	4	3
(Spain) A Muñoz (Spain) M Orantes	6	6	6
(West Germany) J Fassbender (West Germany) H-J Pohmann	4	4	2

Second round
1	(United States) A Ashe (United States) D Ralston	6	6	6
(United States) M Fishbach (United States) P Fishbach	3	0	2
(United States) V Gerulaitis (United States) E Scott	2	6	6	4	6
(Czechoslovakia) M Holeček (New Zealand) O Parun	6	3	4	6	7
7	(Australia) J Newcombe (United Kingdom) R Taylor	6	6	7
(United States) T Leonard (Socialist Federal Republic of Yugoslavia) N Pilić	3	2	6
(United States) B Lutz (United States) C Pasarell	6	6	7	6
(Spain) A Muñoz (Spain) M Orantes	3	7	5	1

Third round
1	(United States) A Ashe (United States) D Ralston
(Czechoslovakia) M Holeček (New Zealand) O Parun	w/o
7	(Australia) J Newcombe (United Kingdom) R Taylor	7	7	6
(United States) B Lutz (United States) C Pasarell	6	5	3

Quarterfinals
(Czechoslovakia) M Holeček (New Zealand) O Parun	0	3	6
7	(Australia) J Newcombe (United Kingdom) R Taylor	6	6	7

==== Section 2 ====
First round
3	(Romania) I Năstase (Romania) I Țiriac	6	6	6
(Egypt) I El Shafei (New Zealand) B Fairlie	4	4	4
(United States) G Mulloy (United States) B Talbert	4	0	3
(United States) P Gonzales (United States) R Gonzales	6	6	6
(Australia) T Addison (United States) F McNair	1	4	3
(United States) R Holmberg (United States) C Richey	6	6	6
(Australia) R Case (Australia) J Cooper	6	6	4	6	4
(United States) M Estep (United States) S Stewart	1	2	6	7	6
5	(South Africa) B Hewitt (South Africa) F McMillan	6	6	6
(Japan) J Kamiwazumi (Japan) T Sakai	4	2	2
(Indonesia) G Widjojo (Ecuador) E Zuleta	3	1	7	3
(Australia) B Carmichael (Australia) R Ruffels	6	6	6	6
(United States) J Connors (South Africa) T Ryan	7	4	6	6
(United States) P Gerken (United States) B Gottfried	6	6	3	4
(United States) S Mayer (United States) R Tanner	6	6	6	3	6
(United States) H Fitzgibbon (Mexico) A Palafox	7	4	4	6	7

Second round
3	(Romania) I Năstase (Romania) I Țiriac	6	4	6	6
(United States) P Gonzales (United States) R Gonzales	2	6	3	2
(United States) R Holmberg (United States) C Richey	6	3	7	5	3
(United States) M Estep (United States) S Stewart	3	6	6	7	6
5	(South Africa) B Hewitt (South Africa) F McMillan	6	7	7	6
(Australia) B Carmichael (Australia) R Ruffels	7	6	6	4
(United States) J Connors (South Africa) T Ryan	7	3	6	6
(United States) H Fitzgibbon (Mexico) A Palafox	6	6	3	4

Third round
3	(Romania) I Năstase (Romania) I Țiriac	7	6	6
(United States) M Estep (United States) S Stewart	6	2	4
5	(South Africa) B Hewitt (South Africa) F McMillan	6	6	6
(United States) J Connors (South Africa) T Ryan	3	1	3

Quarterfinals
3	(Romania) I Năstase (Romania) I Țiriac	7	6	3	7	3
5	(South Africa) B Hewitt (South Africa) F McMillan	5	7	6	5	6

=== Bottom half ===
==== Section 3 ====
First round
(United States) A Olmedo (United States) H Richardson	2	3	4
(Sweden) O Bengtson (Australia) R Keldie	6	6	6
(United States) D Knight (United States) L Schloss	3	4	2
(United States) T Edlefsen (United States) F Froehling	6	6	6
(Rhodesia) H Irvine (Rhodesia) A Pattison	6	5	7	6
(Japan) K Hirai (Japan) J Kuki	4	7	6	1
(Australia) J Gardner (United States) T Howard	3	3	6	6
6	(United States) S Smith (United States) E van Dillen	6	6	4	7
(United Kingdom) M Cox (United Kingdom) G Stilwell	3	7	5	3
(South Africa) B Maud (Australia) A Stone	6	6	7	6
(Japan) K Tanabe (South Africa) P van Lingen
(United States) R McKinley (United States) D Stockton	w/o
(United States) R Fisher (United States) S Pasarell
(France) P Barthès (France) G Goven	w/o
(United States) C McKinley (United States) P Walthall	0	2	1
4	(Australia) B Bowrey (Australia) O Davidson	6	6	6

Second round
(Sweden) O Bengtson (Australia) R Keldie	7	4	6	3	7
(United States) T Edlefsen (United States) F Froehling	6	6	2	6	6
(Rhodesia) H Irvine (Rhodesia) A Pattison	4	4	5
6	(United States) S Smith (United States) E van Dillen	6	6	7
(South Africa) B Maud (Australia) A Stone	6	7	6	4	7
(United States) R McKinley (United States) D Stockton	3	5	7	6	6
(France) P Barthès (France) G Goven	1	2	7	5
4	(Australia) B Bowrey (Australia) O Davidson	6	6	5	7

Third round
(Sweden) O Bengtson (Australia) R Keldie	2	7	5	1
6	(United States) S Smith (United States) E van Dillen	6	6	7	6
(South Africa) B Maud (Australia) A Stone	6	6	6	2
4	(Australia) B Bowrey (Australia) O Davidson	7	3	7	6

Quarterfinals
6	(United States) S Smith (United States) E van Dillen	6	7	6
4	(Australia) B Bowrey (Australia) O Davidson	4	6	3

==== Section 4 ====
First round
(United States) J Borowiak (Pakistan) H Rahim	6	7	5	5	6
(United States) S Giammalva (United States) D Savitt	4	5	7	7	3
(United States) W Higgins (Socialist Federal Republic of Yugoslavia) N Špear	5	4	4
(United States) J McManus (United States) J Osborne	7	6	6
(France) J-B Chanfreau (France) P Proisy	6	6	6
Alt	(United States) B Bailey (United States) A Neely	3	1	4
(United Kingdom) G Battrick (United Kingdom) P Curtis	4	1	3
8	(Australia) J Alexander (Australia) P Dent	6	6	6
(Australia) C Dibley (Australia) G Masters	6	6	3	4	7
(Mexico) J Loyo Mayo (Mexico) R Ramírez	2	4	6	6	5
(Socialist Federal Republic of Yugoslavia) Ž Franulović (Czechoslovakia) J Kodeš	4	0	6	3
(United States) D Dell (United States) B Seewagen	6	6	2	6
(United States) C Graebner (Brazil) T Koch	6	6	6	6
(Denmark) J Leschly (South Africa) R Moore	3	7	4	4
(Pakistan) MA Ilahi (Pakistan) S Meer	3	4	6
2	(Netherlands) T Okker (United States) M Riessen	6	6	7

Second round
(United States) J Borowiak (Pakistan) H Rahim	6	7	6	6
(United States) J McManus (United States) J Osborne	7	6	4	4
(France) J-B Chanfreau (France) P Proisy
8	(Australia) J Alexander (Australia) P Dent	w/o
(Australia) C Dibley (Australia) G Masters	6	7	6	6
(United States) D Dell (United States) B Seewagen	7	6	4	3
(United States) C Graebner (Brazil) T Koch	6	2	3
2	(Netherlands) T Okker (United States) M Riessen	7	6	6

Third round
(United States) J Borowiak (Pakistan) H Rahim	6	4	3	6	6
8	(Australia) J Alexander (Australia) P Dent	2	6	6	1	4
(Australia) C Dibley (Australia) G Masters	6	5	6
2	(Netherlands) T Okker (United States) M Riessen	7	7	7

Quarterfinals
(United States) J Borowiak (Pakistan) H Rahim	3	4	1
2	(Netherlands) T Okker (United States) M Riessen	6	6	6
