= Sawamatsu =

Sawamatsu (written: 沢松) is a Japanese surname. Notable people with the surname include:

- Junko Sawamatsu (沢松 順子, born 1948), Japanese tennis player
- Kazuko Sawamatsu (沢松 和子, born 1951), Japanese tennis player
- Naoko Sawamatsu (沢松 奈生子, born 1973), Japanese tennis player
