= Chikako Murakami (tennis) =

Japanese tennis player

- Native name: 村上 智佳子
- Country (sports): Japan

Grand Slam singles results
- French Open: Q2 (1970)
- Wimbledon: 2R (1970)
- US Open: 1R (1970)

Grand Slam doubles results
- French Open: 2R (1970)
- US Open: 2R (1970)

Chikako Murakami (村上 智佳子) is a Japanese former professional tennis player.

== Career ==
Murakami made her grand slam singles main draw debut as a qualifier at the 1970 Wimbledon Championships, where she advanced to the second round before being defeated by Christina Sandberg. Her only other main draw grand slam appearance was at the 1970 US Open, where she lost in the first round to Trish Faulkner. In 1971, Murakami was Japanese No. 2.

Partnering with Kimiyo Yagahara, Murakami made her grand slam doubles debut at the 1970 French Open. The pair lost in the second round to eventual champions Gail Chanfreau and Françoise Dürr. Murakami also entered the qualifying tournament for that year's singles competition, but lost in the second round and failed to make the main draw. Her final grand slam doubles appearance came at the 1970 US Open, where she partnered with Jane O'Hara and made it to the second round.
