= 1969 French Open – Women's singles qualifying =

Women's singles qualifying
- 1969 French Open

Events
Singles	men	women		boys	girls
Doubles	men	women	mixed	boys	girls
WC Singles	men	women	quad
WC Doubles	men	women	quad
Legends	−45	45+	women
French Open	· 1970 →

Players who neither had high enough rankings nor received wild cards to enter the main draw of the annual French Open Tennis Championships participated in a qualifying tournament held in the week before the event.

== Qualifiers ==
1. (West Germany) Katja Ebbinghaus
2. (France) Anne-Marie Rouchon
3. (Ecuador) María Eugenia Guzmán
4. (Argentina) Ana María Arias
5. (Argentina) Raquel Giscafré
6. (Australia) Janet Young
7. (France) Nicole Cazaux
8. (United States) Valerie Ziegenfuss

== Lucky losers ==
1. (Argentina) Ana Cavadini
2. (United States) Dorothy Head Knode
3. (Japan) Yaeko Matsuda
4. (Japan) Junko Sawamatsu

== Qualifying draw ==
=== Key ===
- Q = Qualifier
- WC = Wild card
- LL = Lucky loser
- Alt = Alternate
- ITF = ITF entry
- PR = Protected ranking
- SR = Special ranking
- SE = Special exempt
- JE = Junior exempt
- JR = Junior Accelerator Programme entrant
- CO = College Accelerator Programme entrant
- NG = Next Gen Accelerator Program entrant
- w/o = Walkover
- r = Retired
- d = Defaulted

=== First qualifier ===
First round	Qualifying competition
	(West Germany) Katja Ebbinghaus	7	7
	(Japan) Junko Sawamatsu	5	5

=== Second qualifier ===
First round	Qualifying competition
	(France) Anne-Marie Rouchon	8	6
	(United States) Dorothy Head Knode	6	3

=== Third qualifier ===
First round
(France) Johanne Venturino	1	6	6
(Sweden) Margareta Strandberg	6	1	2
(France) Françoise Repoux	2	4
(Ecuador) María Eugenia Guzmán	6	6

Qualifying competition
(France) Johanne Venturino	3	5
(Ecuador) María Eugenia Guzmán	6	7

=== Fourth qualifier ===
First round
Q	(France) Christiane Spinoza	6	6
Q	(United States) Marilyn Aschner	1	3
Q	(Argentina) Ana María Arias	6	6
Q	(Japan) Kimiyo Hatanaka	4	4

Qualifying competition
Q	(France) Christiane Spinoza	6	3	4
Q	(Argentina) Ana María Arias	4	6	6

=== Fifth qualifier ===
First round
(France) Aline Nenot	6	6
(Sweden) Ulla Sandulf	2	0
(France) Irène Isse	1	7	2
(Argentina) Raquel Giscafré	6	5	6

Qualifying competition
(France) Aline Nenot	1	1
(Argentina) Raquel Giscafré	6	6

=== Sixth qualifier ===
First round			Qualifying competition
(France) Jacqueline Le Boubenec	4	3
(Argentina) Ana Cavadini	6	6
(Argentina) Ana Cavadini	6	6	(Argentina) Ana Cavadini	7	7
			(Australia) Janet Young	9	9

=== Seventh qualifier ===
First round	Qualifying competition
	(France) Nicole Cazaux	6	6
	(Japan) Yaeko Matsuda	4	1

=== Eighth qualifier ===
First round	Qualifying competition
	(United Kingdom) Frances Taylor	w/o
	(United States) Valerie Ziegenfuss
