= Marc Bolle =

Belgian tennis player

- Country (sports): Belgium
- Born: 24 June 1949 (age 76) Ghent, Belgium

Singles

Grand Slam singles results
- Australian Open: 1R (1969)

Doubles

Grand Slam doubles results
- Australian Open: 1R (1969)

Marc Bolle (born 24 June 1949) is a Belgian former professional tennis player.

Bolle, a native of Ghent, competed in the main draw of the 1969 Australian Open and was beaten in the first round by the sixth seed Pancho Gonzales. He went on to play collegiate tennis for the University of Tennessee in the early 1970s.
