= Torneo Internazionale di Tennis Parioli =

Defunct tennis tournament
- Tour: ILTF World Circuit (1947–1969) men (1947–1972) women ILTF Independent Circuit (1970–1973) men (1973) women
- Founded: 1947; 78 years ago
- Abolished: 1973; 52 years ago
- Location: Rome, Italy
- Venue: Tennis Club Parioli
- Surface: Clay / outdoor
- Website: Tennis Club Parioli

The Torneo Internazionale di Tennis Parioli or Parioli International Tennis Tournament was a men's and women's clay court tennis tournament founded in 1947. It was the successor tournament to the 1911–1940 Roma Championships. The event was played at the Tennis Club Parioli (f.1906), Rome, Italy until 1973. This tournament was succeeded by the Parioli Challenger (1979–1993) event played at the same venue.

== Finals ==
=== Men's singles ===
(incomplete roll)

| Year | Winners | Runners-up | Score |
|---|---|---|---|
↓ ILTF World Circuit ↓
| 1947 | (Italy) Carlo Della Vida | (Italy) Guido Agazzi | 6–2, 9–7, 6–4. |
| 1950 | (Sweden) Lennart Bergelin | (Italy) Rolando Del Bello | 6–4, 6–4, 6–4. |
| 1954 | (Egypt) Jaroslav Drobný | (Italy) Gianni Cucelli | 8–10, 8–6, 6–2, 7–5. |
| 1955 | (Italy) Gianni Cucelli | (Argentina) Enrique Morea | 6–4, 6–4, 6–3. |
| 1956 | (United States) Budge Patty | (Australia) Lew Hoad | 6–2, 2–6, 6–4, 9–11, 6–4. |
| 1963 | (Australia) Roy Emerson | (United Kingdom) Mike Sangster | 4–6, 4–6, 6–4, 6–4, 6–0. |
| 1965 | (Italy) Nicola Pietrangeli | (Brazil) Ronald Barnes | 10–8, 6–3, 6–3. |
| 1966 | (Italy) Nicola Pietrangeli (2) | (Czechoslovakia) Milan Holeček | 4–6, 6–3, 6–4, 6–0. |
| 1967 | (Italy) Nicola Pietrangeli (3) | (Australia) Martin Mulligan | 0–6, 7–5, 6–4, 11–13, 6–4. |
| 1968 | (Romania) Ion Țiriac | (Romania) Ilie Năstase | 9–7, 6–3, 6–4. |
↓ Open Era ↓
| 1969 | (Australia) Martin Mulligan | (Romania) Ion Țiriac | 6–4, 6–4, 6–2. |
↓ ILTF Independent Circuit ↓
| 1970 | (Soviet Union) Vladimir Korotkov | (Italy) Massimo Di Domenico | 6–4, 6–2. |
| 1971 | (Italy) Adriano Panatta | (Australia) Martin Mulligan | 4–6, 6–4, 6–1. |
| 1972 | (Brazil) Carlos Kirmayr | (Italy) Massimo di Domenico | 4–6, 6–2, 6–4. |

=== Women's singles ===
(incomplete roll)

| Year | Winners | Runners-up | Score |
|---|---|---|---|
↓ ILTF World Circuit ↓
| 1950 | (Italy) Annalisa Bossi | (United Kingdom) Joan Curry | 1–6, 6–3, 6–3 |
| 1953 | (United States) Dorothy Head Knode | (Spain) Pilar Barril | 6–2, 6–4 |
| 1956 | (United Kingdom) Angela Buxton | (France) Jacqueline Amouretti | 6–0, 7–5 |
| 1959 | (Mexico) Yola Ramirez | (South Africa) Sandra Reynolds | 6–2, 6–8, 6–3 |
| 1961 | (Italy) Maria Teresa Riedl | (United States) Mimi Arnold | 7–9, 6–2, 6–4 |
| 1964 | (West Germany) Helga Niessen | (Australia) Karen Krantzcke | 4–6, 6–3, 6–3 |
| 1966 | (West Germany) Helga Niessen (2) | (Italy) Roberta Beltrame | 7–5, 3–6, 7–5 |
| 1967 | (Italy) Monica Giorgi | (Italy) Graziella Perna | 6–4, 6–2 |
| 1968 | (Argentina) Mabel Vrancovich | (France) Monique Lobard | 6–2, 2–3 retd. |
↓ Open Era ↓
| 1969 | (Ecuador) María Guzmán | (Argentina) Mabel Vrancovich | 2–6, 6–3, 6–3 |
| 1970 | (Brazil) Suzana Petersen | (Chile) Ana María Arias | 5–7, 6–3, 8–6 |
| 1971 | (Hungary) Marie Pinterová | (Italy) Lea Pericoli | 6–1, 4–6, 6–4 |
| 1972 | (Romania) Mariana Simionescu | (Soviet Union) Olga Morozova | 6–1, 3–6, 6–2 |
