= John Gardner (tennis) =

Australian tennis player

- Country (sports): Australia

Singles
- Career record: 98–41
- Career titles: 3

Grand Slam singles results
- French Open: Q2 (1969)
- Wimbledon: Q2 (1969)
- US Open: 2R (1971)

Doubles
- Career record: 4–12

Grand Slam doubles results
- French Open: 2R (1969)
- US Open: 2R (1973)

Grand Slam mixed doubles results
- Wimbledon: 1R (1969)

John Gardner is an Australian former professional tennis player.

== Career ==
A U.S. based player from Australia, Gardner played varsity tennis for Southern Methodist University (SMU) while studying for a business degree. He came to the U.S. from rural New South Wales.

In 1965 Gardner played his first tour tournament at the Northern Championships in Manchester. In July 1968 he won the Cheshire Tennis Championships at Brooklands. In April 1969 he won the Sabadell International against John Bartlett at Sabadell, Spain on clay. In 1970 Gardner was runner-up at the U.S. National Amateur Grass Court Championships, and was the SWC singles champion in 1972.

In 1971 he won the U.S. National Amateur Grass Court Championships against Raul Ramirez at Southampton, Long Island, New York. The same year he was a finalist to Dick Dell at the Southern Championships held Birmingham, Alabama On the professional tour he had wins over Georges Goven and Roscoe Tanner. He beat Nikola Špear in the first round of the 1971 US Open and featured in all grand slam main draws except his home tournament. He played his last tour event at the Tulsa Invitation at Tulsa, Oklahoma in 1974.

From 1973 to 1977 he served as SMU's head coach, with the team achieving three fourth-place finishes nationally.
