= 1971 US Open – Men's singles =

Men's singles
- 1971 US Open

Final
- Champion: (United States) Stan Smith
- Runner-up: (Czechoslovakia) Jan Kodeš
- Score: 3–6, 6–3, 6–2, 7–6^{(5–3)}

Details
- Draw: 128
- Seeds: 8

Events
Singles	men	women		boys	girls
Doubles	men	women	mixed	boys	girls
WC Singles	men	women	quad
WC Doubles	men	women	quad
Legends	men	women	mixed
← 1970 ·	US Open	· 1972 →

Stan Smith defeated Jan Kodeš in the final, 3–6, 6–3, 6–2, 7–6^{(5–3)} to win the men's singles tennis title at the 1971 US Open. It was his first major singles title.

Ken Rosewall was the reigning champion, but did not compete this year. Tony Roche, the previous year's runner-up, also did not compete in the tournament this year. The absence of both the previous year's finalists would not happen again at the US Open until 2017, 46 years later.

== Seeds ==
The seeded players are listed below. Stan Smith is the champion; others show the round in which they were eliminated.

1. (Australia) John Newcombe (first round)
2. (United States) Stan Smith (champion)
3. (United States) Arthur Ashe (semifinalist)
4. (Netherlands) Tom Okker (semifinalist)
5. (United States) Marty Riessen (quarterfinalist)
6. (United States) Cliff Richey (third round)
7. (United States) Clark Graebner (quarterfinalist)
8. (Romania) Ilie Năstase (third round)

== Draw ==
=== Key ===
- Q = Qualifier
- WC = Wild card
- LL = Lucky loser
- r = Retired

=== Final eight ===
Quarterfinals
(Czechoslovakia) Jan Kodeš	6	7	6
(United States) Frank Froehling	0	6	3
3	(United States) Arthur Ashe	6	6	7
(Spain) Manuel Orantes	1	2	6
7	(United States) Clark Graebner	2	3	4
4	(Netherlands) Tom Okker	6	6	6
5	(United States) Marty Riessen	6	2	6
2	(United States) Stan Smith	7	6	7

Semifinals
(Czechoslovakia) Jan Kodeš	7	3	4	6	6
3	(United States) Arthur Ashe	6	6	6	3	4
4	(Netherlands) Tom Okker	6	3	6	6	3
2	(United States) Stan Smith	7	6	3	2	6

Final
(Czechoslovakia) Jan Kodeš	6	3	2	6^{3}
2	(United States) Stan Smith	3	6	6	7^{5}

=== Section 1 ===
First round
1	(Australia) Newcombe	6	6	6	3
(Czechoslovakia) Kodeš	2	7	7	6
(United States) Howard	4	2	5
(France) Barthès	6	6	7
(United States) Seewagen	6	2	6	6
(France) Proisy	1	6	4	4
(United States) Austin	6	6	6
(United States) Burrman	3	1	1
(United States) Lutz	6	6	6
(United Kingdom) Stilwell	0	4	4
(Egypt) El Shafei	4	6	4	2
(United Kingdom) Battrick	6	2	6	6
(United States) McNair	4	6	6	6
(Czechoslovakia) Pála	6	4	4	4
(New Zealand) Parun	6	3	6	6
(United States) Stewart	3	6	2	3

Second round
(Czechoslovakia) Kodeš	2	5	6	6	6
(France) Barthès	6	7	4	4	3
(United States) Seewagen	6	3	6	6	6
(United States) Austin	2	6	7	4	2
(United States) Lutz	6	7	6
(United Kingdom) Battrick	3	5	4
(United States) McNair	4	6	6	2	4
(New Zealand) Parun	6	4	4	6	6

Third round
(Czechoslovakia) Kodeš	6	6	6
(United States) Seewagen	4	2	3
(United States) Lutz	6	6	6	3	6
(New Zealand) Parun	4	7	3	6	2

Fourth round
(Czechoslovakia) Kodeš	6	6	6
(United States) Lutz	4	2	4

=== Section 2 ===
First round
8	(Romania) Năstase	6	7	6
(Mexico) Loyo-Mayo	2	5	4
(United States) Borowiak	6	3	6	7
(United States) Guerry	3	6	1	5
(Australia) Carmichael	6	6	7	6
(Spain) Muñoz	3	7	6	4
(South Africa) Ryan	5	6	2
(United States) Stockton	7	7	6
(United States) Froehling	6	6	6
(West Germany) Fassbender	3	3	3
(South Africa) Pattison	6	7	6
(United States) Brien	3	5	1
(Australia) Cooper	6	3	6	4	6
(Australia) Masters	4	6	2	6	3
(United States) Tanner	6	6	6
(United Kingdom) Paish	4	3	0

Second round
8	(Romania) Năstase	6	6	6
(United States) Borowiak	2	4	4
(Australia) Carmichael	5	7	6	1	7
(United States) Stockton	7	6	4	6	5
(United States) Froehling	7	4	6	6	6
(South Africa) Pattison	5	6	7	3	4
(Australia) Cooper	7	6	7	5	3
(United States) Tanner	5	7	6	7	6

Third round
8	(Romania) Năstase	3	3	6
(Australia) Carmichael	6	6	7
(United States) Froehling	7	5	6	7
(United States) Tanner	6	7	3	6

Fourth round
(Australia) Carmichael	6	4	4
(United States) Froehling	7	6	6

=== Section 3 ===
First round
3	(United States) Ashe	6	6	6
(United States) Knight	3	4	1
(United States) Krulevitz	7	6	3	6	6
(United States) Estep	5	2	6	7	4
(United Kingdom) Cox	7	6	7
(Australia) Keldie	5	0	6
(Australia) Davidson	6	7	2	6
(South Africa) Maud	3	5	6	0
(Australia) Alexander	6	6	3	6
(United States) McManus	3	4	6	4
(United Kingdom) Clifton	2	2	0
(Australia) Stone	6	6	6
(West Germany) Pohmann	1	4	6
(Pakistan) Rahim	6	6	7
(United States) Gerken	6	6	3	2	6
(Australia) Ruffels	4	1	6	6	3

Second round
3	(United States) Ashe	6	6	6
(United States) Krulevitz	2	1	1
(United Kingdom) Cox	7	6	6
(Australia) Davidson	6	4	0
(Australia) Alexander	6	4
(Australia) Stone	4	1	r
(Pakistan) Rahim	2	3	6	6	6
(United States) Gerken	6	6	2	4	2

Third round
3	(United States) Ashe	7	6	6
(United Kingdom) Cox	5	2	2
(Australia) Alexander	6	4	6	6
(Pakistan) Rahim	7	6	0	4

Fourth round
3	(United States) Ashe	6	6	6	6
(Australia) Alexander	4	7	4	3

=== Section 4 ===
First round
6	(United States) Richey	6	6	7
(United States) Pasarell	4	4	5
(India) Mukerjea	6	7	7	7
(Rhodesia) Irvine	7	6	6	6
(United States) Osborne	4	7	6	6
(United States) Giammalva Sr.	6	6	3	3
(Brazil) Koch	6	7	6	7
(Chile) Cornejo	3	6	2	6
(United States) Gonzales	6	6	6	6
(United States) R. Kreiss	7	4	4	4
(United Kingdom) Matthews	6	6	7	7	6
(Jamaica) Russell	7	7	6	6	3
(Spain) Orantes	6	7	6
(Czechoslovakia) Zednik	4	5	4
(Argentina) Álvarez	3	4	7	4
(United States) Holmberg	6	6	6	6

Second round
6	(United States) Richey	7	6	6
(India) Mukerjea	5	2	3
(United States) Osborne	6	1	6	6
(Brazil) Koch	3	6	4	3
(United States) Gonzales	7	7	6
(United Kingdom) Matthews	6	6	3
(Spain) Orantes	6	6	4	6
(United States) Holmberg	4	3	6	2

Third round
6	(United States) Richey	7	4	4	4
(United States) Osborne	6	6	6	6
(United States) Gonzales	6	4	4	1
(Spain) Orantes	3	6	6	6

Fourth round
(United States) Osborne	6	2	2	3
(Spain) Orantes	2	6	6	6

=== Section 5 ===
First round
(United States) Fitzgibbon	3	7	7	6
(United States) Dell	6	5	6	4
(Japan) Kuki	6	7	3	6
(Ecuador) Zuleta	0	5	6	4
(United States) Barth	3	3	0
(South Africa) Moore	6	6	6
(Romania) Țiriac	7	4	5
(United States) Gorman	5	6	5	r
(United States) Mayer	0	7	1	0
(Chile) Fillol Sr.	6	6	6	6
(Australia) Gardner	6	3	7	1	6
(Socialist Federal Republic of Yugoslavia) Špear	4	6	6	6	2
(United States) Baer	3	3	2
(United Kingdom) Curtis	6	6	6
(South Africa) McMillan	7	4	1	3
7	(United States) Graebner	6	6	6	6

Second round
(United States) Fitzgibbon	6	6	6
(Japan) Kuki	2	2	4
(South Africa) Moore	6	6	6
(Romania) Țiriac	3	2	4
(Chile) Fillol Sr.	6	6	6
(Australia) Gardner	3	2	1
(United Kingdom) Curtis	1	4	1
7	(United States) Graebner	6	6	6

Third round
(United States) Fitzgibbon	2	6	2
(South Africa) Moore	6	7	6
(Chile) Fillol Sr.	3	2	4
7	(United States) Graebner	6	6	6

Fourth round
(South Africa) Moore	2	4	3
7	(United States) Graebner	6	6	6

=== Section 6 ===
First round
(United States) Olmedo	6	7	4	5	5
(United States) Connors	2	5	6	7	7
(Australia) Dibley	6	6	6
(United States) M. Kreiss	1	1	1
(United States) Scott	4	4	6	3
(Argentina) Vázquez	6	6	1	6
(Australia) Addison	6	1	4	2
(United Kingdom) Taylor	2	6	6	6
(United States) Gerulaitis	4	6	6	4	1
(Japan) Sakai	6	2	1	6	6
(India) Lall	6	7	6	4
(Australia) Case	7	6	7	6
(France) Chanfreau	6	1	3
(Australia) Dent	7	6	6
(Sweden) Bengtson	2	4	6	7	1
4	(Netherlands) Okker	6	6	3	6	6

Second round
(United States) Connors	4	3	4
(Australia) Dibley	6	6	6
(Argentina) Vázquez	2	1	1
(United Kingdom) Taylor	6	6	6
(Japan) Sakai	6	7	6
(Australia) Case	3	6	3
(Australia) Dent	4	3	3
4	(Netherlands) Okker	6	6	6

Third round
(Australia) Dibley	4	6	1	4
(United Kingdom) Taylor	6	3	6	6
(Japan) Sakai	1	1	1
4	(Netherlands) Okker	6	6	6

Fourth round
(United Kingdom) Taylor	4	4	6	3
4	(Netherlands) Okker	6	6	4	6

=== Section 7 ===
First round
(Australia) Brent	6	6	3	3	7
(United States) Turner	3	2	6	6	5
(Australia) Bowrey	3	6	7	6	6
(United States) Faulk	6	7	5	3	4
(United States) Parker	6	3	4	4
(United States) Neely	2	6	6	6
(France) Goven	3	1	5
(Socialist Federal Republic of Yugoslavia) Pilić	6	6	7
(United States) McKinley	6	4	2
(United States) Van Dillen	7	6	6
(Denmark) Leschly	6	6	6
(South Africa) Cramer	1	1	3
(Japan) Hirai	6	3	4
(South Africa) Hewitt	7	6	6
(United States) Gottfried	7	2	4	6	3
5	(United States) Riessen	6	6	6	2	6

Second round
(Australia) Brent	5	4	1
(Australia) Bowrey	7	6	6
(United States) Neely	6	6	3
(Socialist Federal Republic of Yugoslavia) Pilić	7	7	6
(United States) Van Dillen	3	6	3	4
(Denmark) Leschly	6	3	6	6
(South Africa) Hewitt	6	7	2	2
5	(United States) Riessen	7	6	6	6

Third round
(Australia) Bowrey	2	4	3
(Socialist Federal Republic of Yugoslavia) Pilić	6	6	6
(Denmark) Leschly	2	6	5	3
5	(United States) Riessen	6	4	7	6

Fourth round
(Socialist Federal Republic of Yugoslavia) Pilić	5	6	6
5	(United States) Riessen	7	7	7

=== Section 8 ===
First round
(United States) Edlefsen	4	2	6	5
(United States) Holmes	6	6	2	7
(United States) Pasarell	6	4	2	2
(Canada) Sharpe	3	6	6	6
(Canada) Burwash	1	0	7	4
(Czechoslovakia) Holeček	6	6	5	6
(United States) Walthall	2	1	2
(United States) Ralston	6	6	6
(Socialist Federal Republic of Yugoslavia) Franulović	6	6	6
(India) Menon	4	0	3
(United States) Leonard	6	6	6
(United States) Higgins	2	3	4
(New Zealand) Fairlie	6	7	6
(Mexico) Lara	4	5	7	r
(Mexico) Ramírez	0	2	6
2	(United States) Smith	6	6	7

Second round
(United States) Holmes	6	6	6
(Canada) Sharpe	0	4	3
(Czechoslovakia) Holeček	6	7	3	6
(United States) Ralston	3	6	6	4
(Socialist Federal Republic of Yugoslavia) Franulović	6	7	3	5	6
(United States) Leonard	4	6	6	7	7
(New Zealand) Fairlie	2	5	2
2	(United States) Smith	6	7	6

Third round
(United States) Holmes	6	3	1	0
(Czechoslovakia) Holeček	2	6	6	6
(United States) Leonard	2	3	6	3
2	(United States) Smith	6	6	4	6

Fourth round
(Czechoslovakia) Holeček	6	2	r
2	(United States) Smith	7	3

Preceded by 1971 Wimbledon Championships – Men's singles	Grand Slam men's singles	Succeeded by 1972 Australian Open – Men's singles
