= Louise Gonnerman =

American tennis player

- Country (sports): United States
- Born: March 21, 1947 (age 77)

Singles

Grand Slam singles results
- US Open: 1R (1968, 1971)

Doubles

Grand Slam doubles results
- US Open: 1R (1971)

Grand Slam mixed doubles results
- US Open: 3R (1971)

Louise Gonnerman (born March 21, 1947) is an American former professional tennis player.

Raised in River Edge, New Jersey, Gonnerman learned the game at the Oritani Field Club in Hackensack and attended River Dell Regional High School. In 1971 she won the Eastern Clay Court, Westchester, New York State Indoor Championships and New York State Championships outdoor singles titles. She reached the number ranking in the East and twice featured in the singles main draw of the US Open during her career.
