= Helen Worland =

Australian tennis player

- Country (sports): Australia
- Born: 28 April 1950 (age 75)
- Plays: Right-handed

Singles

Grand Slam singles results
- Australian Open: 2R (1969, 1970, 1973)
- Wimbledon: Q3 (1970)

Doubles

Grand Slam doubles results
- Australian Open: QF (1969)
- Wimbledon: 2R (1970)

Helen Worland (born 28 April 1950) is an Australian former professional tennis player.

Worland is originally from Canberra and was an ACT junior champion, later basing herself in Melbourne to train. She featured in the singles second round of the Australian Open three times and was a doubles quarter-finalist in 1969. Her career included a doubles main draw appearance at the 1970 Wimbledon Championships, where she also made the third qualifying round in singles. Before marrying Ian Worland in the early 1970s she competed as Helen Sheedy.
