= Eliza Pande =

American tennis player

- Full name: Eliza Pande Warde
- Country (sports): United States
- Born: January 2, 1953 (age 73)
- Plays: Right-handed

Grand Slam singles results
- Wimbledon: 3R (1971)
- US Open: 3R (1971)

Grand Slam doubles results
- Wimbledon: 1R (1971)
- US Open: 1R (1970, 1971)

Eliza Pande Warde (born January 2, 1953) is an American former tennis player.

Raised in Palo Alto, California, Pande was a Wimbledon junior semi-finalist and won the USTA national 16-and-under championships in 1969, beating Chris Evert in the final. Her other title wins include the 1970 U.S. amateur grasscourt championships and the 1971 Pennsylvania lawn tennis championships.

Pande competed briefly on the professional circuit, with third round appearances at both Wimbledon and the US Open in 1971. She went on to play varsity tennis at Stanford University, which is where she first met future husband Jock Warde, who had been one of the country's top juniors.
