= John Brown (tennis) =

Australian tennis player

- Country (sports): Australia
- Born: 12 July 1940 (age 84); Melbourne, Victoria

Singles
- Career record: 19–22

Grand Slam singles results
- Australian Open: 2R (1968, 1970)
- French Open: 1R (1967)
- Wimbledon: 2R (1969)
- US Open: 3R (1968)

Doubles
- Career record: 3–7

Grand Slam doubles results
- Australian Open: QF (1969)

John Brown (born 12 July 1940) is an Australian sports promoter and former professional tennis player.

As a tennis player, Brown competed on the international tour during the late 1960s and locally in the early 1970s. He made the singles third round of the 1968 US Open and was a doubles quarter-finalist at the 1969 Australian Open.

In the 1970s he served as tournament director of the Australian Open.

Later based in Queensland, Brown held the original license for the Brisbane Bears VFL club and was the inaugural executive chairman of the Australian Baseball League.
