= Vittorio Crotta =

Italian tennis player

- Country (sports): Italy
- Born: 12 April 1946 (age 78)

Singles
- Career record: 3–11
- Career titles: 0

Grand Slam singles results
- Australian Open: 1R (1969)
- French Open: 1R (1966, 1967, 1969)
- Wimbledon: Q3 (1968)
- US Open: –

Doubles
- Career record: 5–6
- Career titles: 0

Grand Slam doubles results
- Australian Open: 1R (1969)
- French Open: 1R (1969)
- Wimbledon: Q2 (1968)
- US Open: –
Medal record
Mediterranean Games
| Bronze medal – third place | 1967 Tunis | Doubles |
- Last updated on: 24 April 2019.

Vittorio Crotta (born 12 April 1946) is an Italian retired professional tennis player who won a bronze medal at the 1967 Mediterranean Games and represented Italy in the Davis Cup in 1967 and 1969.
