= Laurie Tenney =

American tennis player

- Full name: Laurie Tenney Fehrs
- Country (sports): United States
- Born: November 4, 1955 (age 70)

Singles

Grand Slam singles results
- French Open: 3R (1974)
- Wimbledon: 1R (1973, 1974, 1975, 1976)
- US Open: 2R (1971)

Doubles

Grand Slam doubles results
- French Open: QF (1974)
- Wimbledon: 2R (1975)
- US Open: 2R (1971)

Grand Slam mixed doubles results
- Wimbledon: 2R (1973)
- US Open: 3R (1971)

Laurie Tenney (born November 4, 1955) is an American former professional tennis player.

Tenney spent her early life in New York, then was based in Los Angeles during her career. She was the first ever winner of the Easter Bowl junior tournament and in 1970 finished runner-up to Chris Evert in the USTA 16s and under national championships. Subsequently, she competed in the main draw of the 1970 US Open, at only 14 years of age.

During the 1970s she featured on the WTA Tour and in 1973 had a win over Martina Navratilova at a tournament in Miami. She was a semi-finalist at the 1973 Atlantic City Open and a quarter-finalist at the 1974 Canadian Open.

Tenney's best grand slam performance came at the 1974 French Open, where she was a doubles quarter-finalist with Dianne Fromholtz. The pair had to withdraw from their quarter-final match, with Tenney also having her best singles run in a grand slam tournament by reaching the round of 16.

Her younger sister Robin Tenney was also a professional tennis player.

== WTA Tour finals ==
=== Doubles (0-1) ===
Result	W/L	Date	Tournament	Partner	Opponents	Score
Loss	0–1	Jul 1973	Cleveland, United States	(United States) Janice Metcalf	(South Africa) Ilana Kloss (South Africa) Pat Pretorius	6–1, 6–7, 1–6
