= Sandy Stap =

American tennis player

- Full name: Sandra Stap Clifton
- Country (sports): United States

Singles

Grand Slam singles results
- US Open: 1R (1971, 1975)

Doubles

Grand Slam doubles results
- US Open: 2R (1971, 1975)

Grand Slam mixed doubles results
- US Open: 3R (1972)
Medal record
Pan American Games
Gold medal – first place	1975 Mexico City	Women's doubles

Sandra Stap Clifton is an American former professional tennis coach and player.

Stap grew up in Deerfield, Illinois, and was coached by her father, Jake, an ex-baseball player who invented the tennis ball hopper. Her elder sister, Sue Stap, also played professional tennis.

An Orange Bowl (16s) winner in 1970, Stap spent the next decade on tour and also played varsity tennis for Trinity University, where she was a three-time All-American. She won a gold medal in women's doubles gold at the 1975 Pan American Games in Mexico City, partnering her Trinity teammate Stephanie Tolleson.

From 1980 to 1989, she was the women's head coach for Northwestern University, which included four successive undefeated Big Ten seasons and fifth-place finishes in the NCAA Championships in 1986 and 1987.
