= Ching-Ling Chang =

Taiwanese-American tennis player

- Country (sports): Chinese Taipei
- Born: October 8, 1948 (age 76)

Singles

Grand Slam singles results
- French Open: 1R (1974)

Doubles

Grand Slam doubles results
- French Open: 1R (1971)
- US Open: 1R (1971)

Grand Slam mixed doubles results
- US Open: 1R (1971)

Ching-Ling Chang (born October 8, 1948) is a Taiwanese-American former professional tennis player.

Chang was the first player to win a Federation Cup match for Chinese Taipei (Taiwan), which she achieved in her only appearance for the side in 1972. The Taiwanese, debuting in the competition, came up against Norway in Johannesburg and Chang won her singles rubber over Ellen Grindvold. She now lives in Phoenix, Arizona.
