= Marilyn Greenwood =

British tennis player

- Country (sports): United Kingdom
- Born: 4 February 1946 (age 79)
- Height: 5 ft 0 in (1.52 m)

Singles
- Career record: 38–74

Grand Slam singles results
- French Open: 1R (1971)
- Wimbledon: 2R (1970, 1971)

Marilyn Greenwood (born 4 February 1946) is a British former professional tennis player.

== Career ==
Greenwood started playing tennis at age 13. In 1963, Greenwood won her first title at the Lee-On-Solent Open. At the Surrey Championships that year, Greenwood gained international press attention for a wardrobe malfunction during her match against Margaret Lee – Greenwood's skirt fell down during a serve, in front of 2,000 spectators. The following year, she accidentally doused Wimbledon referee Michael Gibson with water during a match, having thrown her water bottle in anger after discovering sand at the bottom of the bottle.

In 1970, she won the Cardiff Open, and her final singles title came at the French Covered Court Championships in 1971, where she defeated Odile de Roubin in the final.

Greenwood made her grand slam singles main draw debut as a lucky loser at the 1970 Wimbledon Championships, having been knocked out in the final round of qualifying. She was beaten in the second round by Marianne Brummer. Greenwood was knocked out in the first round of the 1971 French Open by Christina Sandberg. At the 1971 Wimbledon Championships, she lost to Virginia Wade in the second round.

In 1972, Greenwood was the Tucson Racquet Club pro, and the first female pro in Arizona.

== Personal life ==
Greenwood married actor Alan Oppenheimer in 1984, but the couple have since divorced.
