= 1971 US Open (tennis) =

- Date: 1–12 September
- Edition: 91st
- Category: Grand Slam (ITF)
- Surface: Grass
- Location: Forest Hills, Queens, USA
- Venue: West Side Tennis Club

Champions

Men's singles
- (United States) Stan Smith

Women's singles
- (United States) Billie Jean King

Men's doubles
- (Australia) John Newcombe / (United Kingdom) Roger Taylor

Women's doubles
- (United States) Rosemary Casals / (Australia) Judy Tegart Dalton

Mixed doubles
- (United States) Billie Jean King / (Australia) Owen Davidson
- US Open

The 1971 US Open was a tennis tournament that took place on the outdoor grass courts at the West Side Tennis Club in Forest Hills, Queens, in New York City, New York. The tournament ran from 1 September until 12 September. It was the 91st staging of the US Open, and the fourth Grand Slam tennis event of 1971.

== Finals ==
=== Men's singles ===
(United States) Stan Smith defeated (Czechoslovakia) Jan Kodeš, 3–6, 6–3, 6–2, 7–6^{(5–3)}

• It was Smith's 1st career Grand Slam singles title and his 1st and only at the US Open.

=== Women's singles ===
(United States) Billie Jean King defeated (United States) Rosemary Casals, 6–4, 7–6

• It was King's 6th career Grand Slam singles title, her 2nd during the Open Era and her 2nd at the US Open.

=== Men's doubles ===
(Australia) John Newcombe / (United Kingdom) Roger Taylor defeated (United States) Stan Smith / (United States) Erik van Dillen, 6–7, 6–3, 7–6, 4–6, [5–3]

• It was Newcombe's 12th career Grand Slam doubles title, his 6th during the Open Era and his 2nd US Open and 1st of the open era.
• It was Taylor's 1st career Grand Slam doubles title.

=== Women's doubles ===
(United States) Rosemary Casals / (Australia) Judy Tegart Dalton defeated (France) Gail Chanfreau / (France) Françoise Dürr, 6–3, 6–3

• It was Casals' 6th career Grand Slam doubles title, her 4th during the Open Era and her 2nd at the US Open.
• It was Tegart Dalton's 8th and last career Grand Slam doubles title, her 5th during the Open Era and her 2nd at the US Open.

=== Mixed doubles ===
(United States) Billie Jean King / (Australia) Owen Davidson defeated (Netherlands) Betty Stöve / (South Africa) Robert Maud, 6–3, 7–5

== Seeded players ==
=== Men's singles ===
1. (Australia) John Newcombe (first round, lost to Jan Kodeš)
2. (United States) Stanley Smith (champion)
3. (United States) Arthur Ashe (semifinals, lost to Jan Kodeš)
4. (Netherlands) Tom Okker (semifinals, lost to Stanley Smith)
5. (United States) Marty Riessen (quarterfinals, lost to Stanley Smith)
6. (United States) Cliff Richey (third round, lost to Jim Osborne)
7. (United States) Clark Graebner (quarterfinals, lost to Tom Okker)
8. (Romania) Ilie Năstase (third round, lost to Bob Carmichael)

== Prize money ==
Event		W	F	SF	QF	4R	3R	2R	1R
Singles	Men	$20,000	$10,000	$5,000	$2,500	$1,250	$900	$600	$300
Singles	Women	$7,500	$3,750	$1,750	$1,250	-	$625	$400	$150

Preceded by 1971 Wimbledon Championships	Grand Slams	Succeeded by 1972 Australian Open
