= Massimo Di Domenico =

Italian tennis player

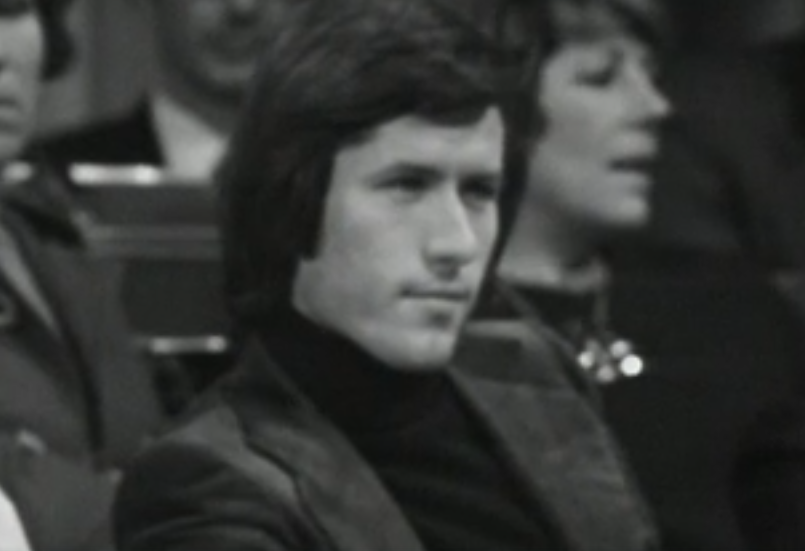
- Country (sports): Italy
- Born: 5 December 1945 (age 80)

Singles
- Career titles: 0
- Highest ranking: No. 199 (14 June 1976)

Grand Slam singles results
- Australian Open: 2R (1969)
- French Open: 3R (1969)

Doubles
- Career titles: 0

Grand Slam doubles results
- Australian Open: 2R 1969)
- Wimbledon: 2R (1970)

Massimo Di Domenico (born 5 December 1945) is a former professional tennis player from Italy who was active in the 1960s and 1970s.

His best singles result at a Grand Slam tournament was reaching the third round at the French Open in 1969, in which he lost to seventh-seeded Roy Emerson in four sets. At the Australian Open earlier that year, he had a bye in the first round and lost to first-seeded Rod Laver in the second round in straight sets. At Wimbledon, he took part in the singles qualifying event from 1969 to 1971 but did not make it to the main draw. In doubles, he reached the second round at the Australian Open in 1969 and at Wimbledon in 1970 with compatriots Adriano Panatta and Ezio Di Matteo respectively.

Di Domenico played for the Italian Davis Cup team in 1970 and 1971 and had a 3–3 win–loss record.
