= Gail Glasgow =

American tennis player

- Country (sports): United States
- Born: April 24, 1951 (age 74)

Singles

Grand Slam singles results
- Wimbledon: 3R (1970)
- US Open: 1R (1969, 1970, 1971)

Doubles

Grand Slam doubles results
- Wimbledon: 2R (1970, 1971)
- US Open: 2R (1970)

Grand Slam mixed doubles results
- Wimbledon: 3R (1973)
- US Open: 2R (1978)

Gail Glasgow (born April 24, 1951) is an American former professional tennis player. She also competed under her maiden name Gail Hansen and briefly as Gail Elliott.

Glasgow grew up in Palo Alto, California and was one of the country's top junior players in the late 1960s.

During the 1970s she played on the professional tour, with main draw appearances at Wimbledon and the US Open. She reached the third round of the 1970 Wimbledon Championships. In 1975, partnering Betty Ann Stuart, she was a doubles finalist of a WTA Tour tournament in Mission Viejo, losing the match to Chris Evert and Martina Navratilova.

== WTA Tour finals ==
=== Doubles: 1 (0-1) ===
Result	No.	Date	Tournament	Surface	Partner	Opponents	Score
Loss	1.	Sep, 1975	Mission Viejo, United States	Hard	(United States) Betty Ann Stuart	(United States) Chris Evert (Czechoslovakia) Martina Navratilova	3–6, 5–7
