= Sally Holdsworth =

British tennis player

- Country (sports): United Kingdom
- Born: 10 February 1944 (age 81)
- Turned pro: 1968 (amateur circuit 1959)
- Retired: 1972

Singles
- Career record: 97–176
- Career titles: 7

Grand Slam singles results
- French Open: 3R (1964)
- Wimbledon: 2R (1971)
- US Open: 1R (1970, 1971)

Doubles

Grand Slam doubles results
- French Open: 2R (1964, 1965)
- Wimbledon: 2R (1967, 1969, 1970, 1971)
- US Open: 1R (1970, 1971)

Grand Slam mixed doubles results
- French Open: 1R (1964, 1965)
- Wimbledon: 4R (1971)
- US Open: 3R (1970)

Sally Holdsworth (born 10 February 1944) is a British former professional tennis player.

Holdsworth, a Wimbledon junior semi-finalist, grew up in the town of Huddersfield. She began competing on the international tour in the 1960s and had her best Wimbledon performance in 1971 when she reached the round of 16 of the mixed doubles with John Paish.

Following her tennis career, Holdsworth ran a hotel in Barbados, then later served as an executive for the International Tennis Federation. In 2000 she organised the Parade of Champions which was held at Wimbledon to commemorate the club's 100th anniversary. She also established Wimbledon's Last Eight Club.
