= Helen Kayser =

Australian tennis player

- Country (sports): Australia
- Plays: Left-handed

Singles

Grand Slam singles results
- Australian Open: 2R (1970, 1971)
- Wimbledon: Q2 (1970)

Doubles

Grand Slam doubles results
- Australian Open: QF (1971)
- Wimbledon: 2R (1970)

Helen Kayser is an Australian former professional tennis player.

A left-handed player from Wollongong, Kayser was active on tour in the 1960s and 1970s.

Kayser played in the doubles main draw at Wimbledon and twice featured in the singles second round of the Australian Open, including in 1971 when she lost to Evonne Goolagong. She also made the quarter-finals of the women's doubles that year, partnering Barbara Hawcroft.
