= Lita Liem Sugiarto =

Indonesian tennis player

- Country (sports): Indonesia
- Born: 27 February 1946 (age 80)
- Retired: 1981
- Plays: Ambidextrous (forehand both sides)

Singles
- Career record: no value
- Career titles: 10 ITF

Grand Slam singles results
- Australian Open: 3R (1968, 1970)
- French Open: 3R (1974)
- Wimbledon: 3R (1972)
- US Open: 2R (1971)

Doubles
- Career record: no value
- Career titles: 16 ITF

Grand Slam doubles results
- Australian Open: QF (1970)
- French Open: 3R (1970)
- Wimbledon: QF (1971)
- US Open: 1R (1971)

Grand Slam mixed doubles results
- Australian Open: 1R (1968)
- French Open: –
- Wimbledon: –
- US Open: 2R (1971)
Medal record
Women's Tennis
Representing Indonesia
Asian Games
Gold medal – first place	1966 Bangkok	Doubles
Gold medal – first place	1966 Bangkok	Team
Gold medal – first place	1974 Tehran	Singles
Bronze medal – third place	1966 Bangkok	Singles
Bronze medal – third place	1966 Bangkok	Mixed Doubles
SEA Games
Gold medal – first place	1977 Kuala Lumpur	Team
Gold medal – first place	1977 Kuala Lumpur	Mixed Doubles
Gold medal – first place	1979 Jakarta	Singles
Gold medal – first place	1979 Jakarta	Mixed Doubles
Gold medal – first place	1979 Jakarta	Team
Gold medal – first place	1981 Manila	Team
Silver medal – second place	1977 Kuala Lumpur	Doubles
Silver medal – second place	1981 Manila	Mixed Doubles
Bronze medal – third place	1979 Jakarta	Doubles
- Last updated on: 5 May 2009.

Lita Liem Sugiarto (born 27 February 1946), sometimes known by her maiden name Lita Liem, a former Indonesian professional tennis player. She played at Grand Slam events between 1968 and 1975, in singles, doubles and mixed doubles.

In women's doubles, she and partner Lany Kaligis reached two Grand Slam quarterfinals: the Australian Open in 1970 and Wimbledon in 1971. As such, she and Kaligis were among the first Indonesians to reach the later rounds of a Grand Slam competition. Kaligis was the only partner that Sugiarto ever played with in Grand Slam doubles competition.

In singles, her best results were her third round exits from the Australian Championships in 1968, the Australian Open in 1970, Wimbledon in 1972 and the French Open in 1974.

At the 1966 Asian Games at Bangkok, she won the bronze medal in the women's singles, the gold medal in the women's doubles with Lany Kaligis, and the bronze medal in the mixed doubles with Sutarjo Sugiarto. She won the gold medal in the women's singles at the 1974 Asian Games in Tehran.

She was part of Indonesia's Fed Cup team in 1969, 1970, 1973, 1974, 1975, 1978, 1979, 1980 and 1981.

== ITF finals ==
Legend
$25,000 tournaments
$10,000 tournaments

=== Singles (10–6) ===
Result	No.	Date	Tournament	Surface	Opponent	Score
Win	1.	17 May 1964	Jakarta, Indonesia	Hard	(Indonesia) Otty Oey	6–1, 6–0
Win	2.	30 August 1964	Surabaya, Indonesia	Grass	(Indonesia) Mien Suhadi	6–2, 6–4
Loss	3.	20 April 1965	Semarang, Indonesia	Hard	(Indonesia) Mien Suhadi	6–4, 4–6, 7–9
Win	4.	1 July 1965	Jakarta, Indonesia	Hard	(Indonesia) Mien Suhadi	6–1, 6–1
Win	5.	5 September 1965	Colombo, Sri Lanka	Clay	(India) Cheri Chihyana	6–0, 6–0
Win	6.	11 September 1966	Colombo, Sri Lanka	Clay	(India) Dechu Appaiah	6–1, 6–1
Win	7.	6 August 1967	Ostend, Belgium	Clay	(Belgium) Monique Bedoret	6–3, 6–4
Win	8.	11 September 1967	Kuala Lumpur, Malaysia	Hard	(Indonesia) Lany Kaligis	6–2, 4–6, 7–5
Win	9.	15 September 1968	Penang, Malaysia	Hard	(Indonesia) Loanita Rachman	6–4, 6–2
Loss	10.	3 July 1970	Wimbledon, United Kingdom	Grass	(Australia) Evonne Goolagong	2–6, 1–6
Win	11.	10 October 1971	Hong Kong	Carpet	(New Zealand) Cecelie Fleming	6–3, 6–1
Loss	12.	29 October 1972	Jakarta, Indonesia	Hard	(Indonesia) Lany Kaligis	5–7, 7–5, 5–7
Loss	13.	21 April 1974	Kuala Lumpur, Malaysia	Hard	(Indonesia) Lany Kaligis	5–7, 6–3, 3–6
Loss	14.	22 September 1974	Colombo, Sri Lanka	Hard	(Indonesia) Lany Kaligis	5–7, 6–1, 1–6
Loss	15.	21 April 1975	Kuala Lumpur, Malaysia	Hard	(Indonesia) Lany Kaligis	2–6, 4–6
Win	16.	18 April 1976	Kuala Lumpur, Malaysia	Hard	(Thailand) Suthasini Sirikaya	6–0, 6–3

=== Doubles (16–6) ===
Result	No.	Date	Tournament	Surface	Partner	Opponents	Score
Loss	1.	30 August 1964	Surabaya, Indonesia	Grass	(Indonesia) Jooce Suwarimbo	(Indonesia) Vonny Djoa (Indonesia) Mien Suhadi	2–6, 6–4, 1–6
Loss	2.	14 February 1965	Manila, Philippines	Hard	(Indonesia) Mien Suhadi	(Philippines) Desideria Ampon (Philippines) Patricia Yngayo	3–6, 4–6
Win	3.	20 April 1965	Semarang, Indonesia	Hard	(Indonesia) Mien Suhadi	(Indonesia) Otty Oey (Indonesia) Lany Kaligis	6–2, 6–2
Win	4.	1 July 1965	Jakarta, Indonesia	Hard	(Indonesia) Mien Suhadi	(Indonesia) Lany Kaligis (Indonesia) Vonny Djoa	6–1, 6–3
Win	5.	5 September 1965	Colombo, Sri Lanka	Hard	(Indonesia) Mien Suhadi	(Sri Lanka) Sriya Gooneratne (India) Sashikala Murthy	6–4, 7–5
Win	6.	4 September 1966	Ipoh, Malaysia	Hard	(Indonesia) Mien Suhadi	(Thailand) Somsri Klumsombut (Thailand) Phanow Sudsawadsi	7–5, 6–2
Win	7.	11 September 1965	Colombo, Sri Lanka	Clay	(Indonesia) Lany Kaligis	(India) Dechu Appaiah (Sri Lanka) Sriya Gooneratne	6–2, 6–3
Win	8.	6 August 1967	Ostend, Belgium	Clay	(Indonesia) Lany Kaligis	(Belgium) Monique Bedoret (Belgium) Michele Kahn	6–4, 1–6, 6–2
Win	9.	11 September 1967	Kuala Lumpur, Malaysia	Hard	(Indonesia) Lany Kaligis	(Indonesia) Mien Suhadi (Indonesia) Yolanda Soemarno	6–2, 6–0
Win	10.	15 September 1968	Penang, Malaysia	Hard	(Indonesia) Lany Kaligis	(Indonesia) Loanita Rachman (Indonesia) Mien Suhadi	6–3, 6–2
Win	11.	1 March 1971	Jakarta, Indonesia	Hard	(Indonesia) Lany Kaligis	(Netherlands) Trudy Groenman (Netherlands) Betty Stöve	6–4, 4–6, 6–4
Loss	12.	1 September 1971	Singapore, Singapore	Hard	(Indonesia) Mien Suhadi	(South Korea) Lee Duk-hee (Chinese Taipei) Chang Ching-ling	2–6, 3–6
Loss	13.	12 September 1971	Kuala Lumpur, Malaysia	Hard	(Indonesia) Lany Kaligis	(New Zealand) Cecelie Fleming (South Korea) Lee Duk-hee	4–6, 6–2, 5–7
Win	14.	10 October 1971	Hong Kong	Carpet	(Indonesia) Lany Kaligis	(New Zealand) Cecelie Fleming (Chinese Taipei) Chang Ching-ling	6–2, 6–1
Loss	15.	1 August 1972	Hilversum, Netherlands	Clay	(Indonesia) Lany Kaligis	(Belgium) Michèle Gurdal (Netherlands) Betty Stöve	4–6, 0–6
Win	16.	18 September 1972	Singapore, Singapore	Hard	(Indonesia) Lany Kaligis	(Japan) Hideko Goto (Japan) Kimiyo Hatanaka	6–2, 6–1
Loss	17.	13 May 1973	Stuttgart, Germany	Clay	(Indonesia) Lany Kaligis	(Sweden) Christina Sandberg (Sweden) Mimmi Wikstedt	6–7, 6–7
Win	18.	21 April 1974	Kuala Lumpur, Malaysia	Hard	(Indonesia) Lany Kaligis	(Australia) Lois Raymond (Australia) Gwen Stirton	6–2, 5–7, 9–7
Win	19.	30 June 1974	Heerlen, Netherlands	Clay	(Indonesia) Lany Kaligis	(Spain) Carmen Perea (Spain) Silvia Blume	6–3, 6–4
Win	20.	22 September 1974	Colombo, Sri Lanka	Hard	(Indonesia) Lany Kaligis	(India) Susan Das (India) Nirupama Mankad	7–5, 1–6, 6–1
Win	21.	21 April 1975	Kuala Lumpur, Malaysia	Hard	(Indonesia) Lany Kaligis	(Australia) Lois Raymond (Australia) Gwen Stirton	6–2, 4–6, 6–3
Win	22.	18 April 1976	Kuala Lumpur, Malaysia	Hard	(Indonesia) Loanita Rachman	(Thailand) Chalada Wattana (Thailand) Suthasini Sirikaya	6–4, 3–6, 6–1

== Grand Slam singles performance timeline ==
Key
W	F	SF	QF	#R	RR	Q#	P#	DNQ	A	Z#	PO	G	S	B	NMS	NTI	P	NH

(W) winner; (F) finalist; (SF) semifinalist; (QF) quarterfinalist; (#R) rounds 4, 3, 2, 1; (RR) round-robin stage; (Q#) qualification round; (P#) preliminary round; (DNQ) did not qualify; (A) absent; (Z#) Davis/Fed Cup Zonal Group (with number indication) or (PO) play-off; (G) gold, (S) silver or (B) bronze Olympic/Paralympic medal; (NMS) not a Masters tournament; (NTI) not a Tier I tournament; (P) postponed; (NH) not held; (SR) strike rate (events won / competed); (W–L) win–loss record.

Tournament	1968	1969	1970	1971	1972	1973	1974	1975
Australian Open	3R	1R	3R	A	A	A	A	A
French Open	A	1R	2R	1R	P1	1R	3R	2R
Wimbledon	A	2R	1R	1R	3R	1R	A	A
US Open	A	A	1R	2R	1R	A	A	A

== Grand Slam doubles performance timeline ==
Tournament	1968	1969	1970	1971	1972	1973	1974	1975
Australian Open	2R	1R	QF	A	A	A	A	A
French Open	A	2R	3R	2R	1R	1R	2R	A
Wimbledon	A	2R	2R	QF	2R	2R	A	2R
US Open	A	A	1R	A	A	A	A	A
