= 1969 Australian Open =

- Date: 20–27 January 1969
- Edition: 57th
- Category: Grand Slam (ITF)
- Surface: Grass
- Location: Brisbane, Australia
- Venue: Milton Courts

Champions

Men's singles
- (Australia) Rod Laver

Women's singles
- (Australia) Margaret Court

Men's doubles
- (Australia) Rod Laver / (Australia) Roy Emerson

Women's doubles
- (Australia) Margaret Court / (Australia) Judy Tegart-Dalton

Mixed doubles
- (Australia) Margaret Court / (United States) Marty Riessen (United Kingdom) Ann Haydon-Jones / (Australia) Fred Stolle
| ← 1968 · | Australian Open | · 1970 → |

The 1969 Australian Open was the first Australian Open and the final Grand Slam tournament to allow both amateur and professionals. The tournament was played in Brisbane on Milton's grass courts between a men's field of 48 and a women's field of 32. It was the 57th edition of the tournament, the 7th and last one held in Brisbane, and the first Grand Slam tournament of the year.

== Tournament ==
The semi-final between Rod Laver and Tony Roche was played in 105-degree heat. That contest dragged on for more than four hours, both players putting wet cabbage leaves in their hats to help them keep cool. The Men's singles title was eventually won by Rod Laver defeating Andrés Gimeno. Margaret Court took her 8th singles title and the $1,500 prize from Billie Jean King and swept the tournament with Women's doubles and Mixed. The 1969 Australian Open was the only year in the Open era that a mixed doubles championship was staged, until resumption in 1987. Marty Riessen and Margaret Court shared the title with Fred Stolle and Ann Haydon-Jones because the final was not played due to a lack of time. It was also the last year that a junior mixed doubles championship was played, Australians Geoff Masters and Barbara Hawcroft taking the title. Laver's win was the first step towards his second Grand Slam.

== Seniors ==
=== Men's singles ===
(Australia) Rod Laver defeated (Spain) Andrés Gimeno, 6–3, 6–4, 7–5

=== Women's singles ===
(Australia) Margaret Court defeated (United States) Billie Jean King, 6–4, 6–1

=== Men's doubles ===
(Australia) Rod Laver / (Australia) Roy Emerson defeated (Australia) Ken Rosewall / (Australia) Fred Stolle, 6–4, 6–4

=== Women's doubles ===
(Australia) Margaret Court / (Australia) Judy Tegart-Dalton defeated (United States) Rosemary Casals / (United States) Billie Jean King, 6–4, 6–4

=== Mixed doubles ===
(Australia) Margaret Court / (United States) Marty Riessen and (United Kingdom) Ann Haydon-Jones / (Australia) Fred Stolle (Shared title – final not played)

| Preceded by 1968 US Open | Grand Slams | Succeeded by 1969 French Open |
