= Rod Brent =

Australian tennis player

- Country (sports): Australia

Grand Slam singles results
- Australian Open: 3R (1962)
- US Open: 2R (1971)

Rod Brent is a former Australian tennis player who was active during the 1960s and 1970s. He used to teach tennis at Cliff Street Racquet Club in New Rochelle. In the 1971 US Open, he defeated American Steve Turner in the first round in five sets, before losing to Australian Bill Bowrey in the second round.
