= Helen Amos =

Australian tennis player

- Country (sports): Australia
- Born: 30 June 1948 (age 76)
- Plays: Right-handed

Singles

Grand Slam singles results
- Australian Open: QF (1966)
- French Open: 1R (1970)
- Wimbledon: 3R (1969)
- US Open: 1R (1969)

Doubles

Grand Slam doubles results
- Australian Open: 2R (1968, 1970)
- French Open: 2R (1970)
- Wimbledon: 1R (1970)
- US Open: 1R (1969)

Helen Amos (born 30 June 1948) is an Australian former professional tennis player.

Amos, a South Australian, was a quarter-finalist at the 1966 Australian Championships.

At the 1968 US Open she was scheduled to meet Billie Jean King in the first round, for the tournament's inaugural open-era match, but got replaced at the last minute when she didn't show up in time.
