= Farel Footman =

American tennis player

- Country (sports): United States
- Height: 5 ft 9 in (175 cm)
- Plays: Right-handed

Singles

Grand Slam singles results
- US Open: 3R (1959)

Farel Footman is an American former tennis player active on tour from the 1950s to 1970s.

Footman grew up in the San Francisco Bay Area and attended Lowell High School. Footman was a number one ranked player in Northern California. In 1959, she reached the singles third round of the U.S. national championships for the only time, losing to fourth seed Darlene Hard in a three-set match.
