= Jane O'Hara =

Canadian author, journalist and tennis player

- Country (sports): Canada
- Born: 24 July 1951 (age 75)
- Plays: Right-handed

Grand Slam singles results
- Wimbledon: 1R (1970, 1971)
- US Open: 3R (1970)

Grand Slam doubles results
- Wimbledon: 2R (1969, 1971)
- US Open: 2R (1970)

Grand Slam mixed doubles results
- Wimbledon: 4R (1970)
- US Open: 1R (1971)

Jane O'Hara (born 24 July 1951) is a Canadian author, journalist and former professional tennis player.

A right-handed player from Toronto, Ontario, O'Hara appeared in 18 Federation Cup ties for Canada between 1969 and 1975. Her best grand slam performance came at the 1970 US Open, where she reached the round of 16.

O'Hara was a sports editor for the Ottawa Sun, the first woman to hold this role for a major Canadian newspaper. She was inducted into the Tennis Canada Hall of Fame in 2002.

== See also ==
- List of Canada Fed Cup team representatives
