= Junko Sawamatsu =

Japanese tennis player (born 1948)

- Country (sports): Japan
- Born: 10 April 1948 (age 78) Nishinomiya, Japan

Singles

Grand Slam singles results
- French Open: 1R (1968, 1960)

Doubles

Grand Slam doubles results
- French Open: 3R (1969)
- Wimbledon: QF (1970)
- US Open: 1R (1971)

Grand Slam mixed doubles results
- French Open: 2R (1970)
- Wimbledon: 2R (1971)
- US Open: 2R (1970)
Medal record
Representing Japan
Summer Universiade
| Silver medal – second place | 1970 Turin | Women's doubles |

Junko Sawamatsu (沢松 順子, Sawamatsu Junko; born 10 April 1948) is a retired Japanese tennis player.

== Career ==
She competed in singles in the French Open twice and in the U.S. Open once. Competing with her sister Kazuko Sawamatsu in ladies doubles, she reached the quarterfinals of Wimbledon in 1970, losing to eventual champions Rosie Casals and Billie Jean King.

She competed for the Japanese Federation Cup team in 1970 and 1971.

== Private life ==
Sawamatsu is the mother of former professional tennis player Naoko Sawamatsu, who peaked at world No.14.
