= 1971 French Open – Men's singles qualifying =

Men's singles qualifying
- 1971 French Open

Events
| Singles | men | women | | boys | girls |
| Doubles | men | women | mixed | boys | girls |
| WC Singles | men | women | quad |
| WC Doubles | men | women | quad |
| Legends | −45 | 45+ | women |

Qualification
| Singles | men | women |
- French Open

Players who neither had high enough rankings nor received wild cards to enter the main draw of the annual French Open Tennis Championships participated in a qualifying tournament held in the week before the event.

== Qualifiers ==
1. (Italy) Vincenzo Franchitti
2. (Ecuador) Eduardo Zuleta
3. (Soviet Union) Teimuraz Kakulia
4. (Socialist Federal Republic of Yugoslavia) Zlatko Ivančić
5. (France) Pierre Joly
6. (Australia) Geoff Masters
7. (Hungary) Róbert Machán
8. (South Africa) Pat Cramer
9. (West Germany) Rainer Kuhlmey
10. (Czechoslovakia) Štěpán Koudelka
11. (Hungary) Géza Varga
12. (Colombia) Iván Molina
13. (Australia) Syd Ball
14. (France) Bernard Paul
15. (Colombia) William Álvarez
16. (France) Wanaro N'Godrella
17. (Italy) Antonio Zugarelli
18. (Soviet Union) Hendrick Sepp
19. (Indonesia) Atet Wijono
20. (Italy) Corrado Barazzutti

== Lucky losers ==
1. (Netherlands) Paul van Min
2. (United Kingdom) John Paish
3. (Romania) Sever Mureșan

== Qualifying draw ==
Key

- Q = Qualifier
- WC = Wild card
- LL = Lucky loser
- Alt = Alternate
- ITF = ITF entry
- PR = Protected ranking
- SR = Special ranking
- SE = Special exempt
- JE = Junior exempt
- JR = Junior Accelerator Programme entrant
- CO = College Accelerator Programme entrant
- NG = Next Gen Accelerator Program entrant
- w/o = Walkover
- r = Retired
- d = Defaulted

=== First qualifier ===
First round
4 | (France) Bernard Detroye | 8 | 5 | 1 | 6 | 8
5 | (India) Gopala Bhupathi | 6 | 7 | 6 | 4 | 6

Second round
(Italy) Vincenzo Franchitti | 2 | 6 | 8 | 0 | 6
(France) Bernard Detroye | 6 | 3 | 6 | 6 | 1
(France) Thierry Bernasconi | 6 | 6 | 6
(United Kingdom) David Segal | 0 | 1 | 0

Qualifying competition
(Italy) Vincenzo Franchitti | 6 | 6 | 6
(France) Thierry Bernasconi | 4 | 3 | 3

=== Second qualifier ===
First round
2 | (Netherlands) Paul van Min | 5 | 6 | 6 | 6
7 | (France) Alain Cassaigne | 7 | 3 | 1 | 3

Second round
(Ecuador) Eduardo Zuleta
(France) Yves Christiaen | w/o
(Netherlands) Paul van Min | 6 | 6 | 6
(Australia) Ray Keldie | 4 | 4 | 4

Qualifying competition
(Ecuador) Eduardo Zuleta | 6 | 6 | 6
(Netherlands) Paul van Min | 3 | 4 | 2

=== Third qualifier ===
First round
4 | (Colombia) Uriel Oquendo | 6 | 6 | 6
5 | (United States) J Harris | 1 | 1 | 1

Second round
(Greece) Periclis Gavrilidis | 6 | 4 | 6 | 6
(Colombia) Uriel Oquendo | 2 | 6 | 2 | 2
(Soviet Union) Teimuraz Kakulia | 10 | 6 | 9
(France) Jean-Claude Fauvet | 8 | 4 | 7

Qualifying competition
(Greece) Periclis Gavrilidis | 2 | 2 | 6 | 7
(Soviet Union) Teimuraz Kakulia | 6 | 6 | 3 | 9

=== Fourth qualifier ===
First round

Second round
(Socialist Federal Republic of Yugoslavia) Zlatko Ivančić
(France) Christian Duxin | w/o
(Romania) Sever Mureșan | 6 | 4 | 3 | 6 | 6
(France) Gérard Pilet | 3 | 6 | 6 | 3 | 1

Qualifying competition
(Socialist Federal Republic of Yugoslavia) Zlatko Ivančić | 7 | 6 | 4 | 4
(Romania) Sever Mureșan | 9 | 4 | 6 | 5^{r}

=== Fifth qualifier ===
First round
2 | (France) Patrick Béraud | 6 | 6 | 6
7 | (United States) J Spalding | 2 | 1 | 0

Second round
(France) Pierre Joly | 13 | 6 | 9
(Belgium) Andre Thielemans | 11 | 2 | 7
(France) Patrick Béraud
(France) Philippe Fremoit | w/o

Qualifying competition
(France) Pierre Joly | 4 | 7 | 3 | 6 | 6
(France) Patrick Béraud | 6 | 5 | 6 | 0 | 1

=== Sixth qualifier ===
First round
4 | (United States) Norman Perry | 9 | 3 | 6 | 6
5 | (France) Jean-Pierre Bombardier | 7 | 6 | 4 | 3
3 | (Brazil) Octavio Piva | 5 | 5 | 6 | 6 | 6
6 | (France) Bernard Le Rays | 7 | 7 | 3 | 1 | 4

Second round
(Japan) Kenichi Hirai | 4 | 6 | 6 | 6
(United States) Norman Perry | 6 | 2 | 2 | 2
(Australia) Geoff Masters | 6 | 6 | 6
(Brazil) Octavio Piva | 3 | 2 | 4

Qualifying competition
(Japan) Kenichi Hirai | 4 | 5 | 3
(Australia) Geoff Masters | 6 | 7 | 6

=== Seventh qualifier ===
First round

Second round
(Hungary) Róbert Machán | 6 | 6 | 6
(France) Sampiero Gavini | 1 | 3 | 1
(France) Jean-Pierre Olivier
(France) Michel Bergès | w/o

Qualifying competition
(Hungary) Róbert Machán | 6 | 6 | 6
(France) Jean-Pierre Olivier | 3 | 0 | 1

=== Eighth qualifier ===
First round
3 | (United States) John Zwieg | 6 | 6 | 5 | 7
6 | (France) Christian Bimes | 4 | 3 | 7 | 5

Second round
(Japan) Takeshi Koura | 6 | 6 | 2 | 6
(France) Marc Ungerer | 3 | 3 | 6 | 1
(South Africa) Pat Cramer | 6 | 6 | 6
(United States) John Zwieg | 3 | 3 | 0

Qualifying competition
(Japan) Takeshi Koura | 1 | 1 | 3
(South Africa) Pat Cramer | 6 | 6 | 6

=== Ninth qualifier ===
First round
1 | (West Germany) Rainer Kuhlmey | 7 | 6 | 4 | 10
8 | (France) Bernard Fuzet | 5 | 2 | 6 | 8

Second round
(West Germany) Rainer Kuhlmey | 6 | 10 | 6 | 5 | 11
(South Africa) Derek Schroder | 1 | 8 | 8 | 7 | 9
(France) Alain Bouteleux | 6 | 3 | 6 | 2 | 6
(Romania) Sever Dron | 4 | 6 | 4 | 6 | 1

Qualifying competition
(West Germany) Rainer Kuhlmey | 10 | 3 | 7 | 8 | 8
(France) Alain Bouteleux | 8 | 6 | 5 | 10 | 6

=== Tenth qualifier ===
First round
4 | (France) François Matheu | 8 | 6 | 6
5 | (Canada) Lew Grinnan | 6 | 2 | 2

Second round
(Czechoslovakia) Štěpán Koudelka | 6 | 8 | 6
(France) François Matheu | 2 | 6 | 3
(United States) Butch Seewagen | 6 | 5 | 6 | 6
(France) Claude Boutard | 1 | 7 | 1 | 3

Qualifying competition
(Czechoslovakia) Štěpán Koudelka | 6 | 7 | 6
(United States) Butch Seewagen | 3 | 5 | 4

=== Eleventh qualifier ===
First round
2 | (United States) J West | 1 | 2 | 3
7 | (France) Jean-Roger Cadot | 6 | 6 | 6

Second round
(France) Alain Benoît-Levy | w/o
(Australia) Allan McDonald
(France) Jean-Roger Cadot | 4 | 2 | 3
(Hungary) Géza Varga | 6 | 6 | 6

Qualifying competition
(Australia) Allan McDonald | 6 | 5 | 3 | 3
(Hungary) Géza Varga | 3 | 7 | 6 | 6

=== Twelfth qualifier ===
First round
1 | (Pakistan) Mohammed Arif Ilahi | 6 | 8 | 0 | 3
8 | (France) Michel Géraud | 4 | 10 | 6 | 6
2 | (United States) Dan Bleckinger | 1 | 4 | 2
7 | (France) Pierre Darmon | 6 | 6 | 6

Second round
(France) Michel Géraud | 2 | 3 | 3
(Colombia) Iván Molina | 6 | 6 | 6
(France) Pierre Darmon | 2 | 3 | 2
(Belgium) Bernard Mignot | 6 | 6 | 6

Qualifying competition
(Colombia) Iván Molina | 6 | 6 | 6
(Belgium) Bernard Mignot | 3 | 2 | 1

=== Thirteenth qualifier ===
First round
1 | (Switzerland) Dimitri Sturdza | 0 | 2 | 1
8 | (Indonesia) Gondo Widjojo | 6 | 6 | 6

Second round
(Indonesia) Gondo Widjojo | 2 | 3 | 3
(Italy) Piero Toci | 6 | 6 | 6
(France) François Battegay | 7 | 4 | 1 | 5
(Australia) Syd Ball | 5 | 6 | 6 | 7

Qualifying competition
(Italy) Piero Toci | 9 | 5 | 8 | 4
(Australia) Syd Ball | 11 | 7 | 6 | 6

=== Fourteenth qualifier ===
First round

Second round
(Portugal) Raúl Peralta | 0 | 4 | 5
(Japan) Jun Kamiwazumi | 6 | 6 | 7
(France) Didier Charlet | 4 | 1 | 2
(France) Bernard Paul | 6 | 6 | 6

Qualifying competition
(Japan) Jun Kamiwazumi | 6 | 4 | 4
(France) Bernard Paul | 8 | 6 | 6

=== Fifteenth qualifier ===
First round
2 | (Brazil) Luis C Moreira | 6 | 9 | 3 | 6
7 | (France) Jean Michy | 3 | 11 | 6 | 8

Second round
(France) Éric Deblicker | 7 | 1 | 3 | 3
(Colombia) William Álvarez | 5 | 6 | 6 | 6
(France) Jean Michy | 7 | 4 | 1 | 0
(Australia) Alvin Gardiner | 5 | 6 | 6 | 6

Qualifying competition
(Colombia) William Álvarez | 7 | 3 | 2 | 6 | 6
(Australia) Alvin Gardiner | 5 | 6 | 6 | 3 | 2

=== Sixteenth qualifier ===
First round
2 | (Japan) Junzo Kawamori | 5 | 2 | 1
7 | (United States) Robert Stock | 7 | 6 | 6

Second round
(France) Patrice Duhamel | w/o
(France) Éric Loliée
(United States) Robert Stock | 5 | 2 | 4
(France) Wanaro N'Godrella | 7 | 6 | 6

Qualifying competition
(France) Éric Loliée | 1 | 3 | 1
(France) Wanaro N'Godrella | 6 | 6 | 6

=== Seventeenth qualifier ===
First round
2 | (Australia) Jim Moore | 4 | 8 | 0 | 3
7 | (France) Denis Grozdanovitch | 6 | 6 | 6 | 6

Second round
(Jamaica) Richard Russell | 3 | 6 | 6 | 6 | 3
(United Kingdom) Chris Bovett | 6 | 8 | 4 | 4 | 6
(France) Denis Grozdanovitch | 8 | 0 | 8 | 3
(Italy) Antonio Zugarelli | 10 | 6 | 6 | 6

Qualifying competition
(United Kingdom) Chris Bovett | 2 | 4 | 2
(Italy) Antonio Zugarelli | 6 | 6 | 6

=== Eighteenth qualifier ===
First round

Second round
(Italy) Roberto Lombardi | 6 | 2 | 6
(Australia) Greg Perkins | 8 | 6 | 8
(France) Armel Collinot | 5 | 3 | 6
(Soviet Union) Hendrick Sepp | 7 | 6 | 8

Qualifying competition
(Australia) Greg Perkins | 3 | 1 | 5
(Soviet Union) Hendrick Sepp | 6 | 6 | 7

=== Nineteenth qualifier ===
First round
3 | (France) Pierre Loizeau | 4 | 2 | 7
6 | (Indonesia) Atet Wijono | 6 | 6 | 9

Second round
(France) Jacques Thamin | 6 | 4 | 0
(United Kingdom) John Paish | 8 | 6 | 6
(Italy) Pietro Marzano | 2 | 3 | 6 | 4
(Indonesia) Atet Wijono | 6 | 6 | 3 | 6

Qualifying competition
(United Kingdom) John Paish | 4 | 4 | 4
(Indonesia) Atet Wijono | 6 | 6 | 6

=== Twentieth qualifier ===
First round

Second round
(France) Gérard Gay | 2 | 1 | 1
(Italy) Corrado Barazzutti | 6 | 6 | 6
(United States) Jim Ward | 2 | 0 | 0
(Australia) John Bartlett | 6 | 6 | 6

Qualifying competition
(Italy) Corrado Barazzutti | 6 | 2 | 2 | 6 | 6
(Australia) John Bartlett | 2 | 6 | 6 | 4 | 1
