= 1971 French Open – Women's singles qualifying =

Women's singles qualifying
- 1971 French Open

Events
Singles	men	women		boys	girls
Doubles	men	women	mixed	boys	girls
WC Singles	men	women	quad
WC Doubles	men	women	quad
Legends	−45	45+	women

Qualification
Singles	men	women
- French Open

Players who neither had high enough rankings nor received wild cards to enter the main draw of the annual French Open Tennis Championships participated in a qualifying tournament held in the week before the event.

== Qualifiers ==
1. (Hungary) Katalin Borka
2. (South Africa) Joan Koudelka
3. (Chile) Ana María Arias
4. (South Africa) Sharon Van Brandis
5. (Indonesia) Lany Kaligis
6. (South Africa) Daphne Botha
7. (United States) Becky Vest
8. (Colombia) Isabel Fernández de Soto
9. (France) Nathalie Fuchs
10. (Australia) Wendy Gilchrist
11. (France) Françoise Repoux
12. (Argentina) Raquel Giscafré
13. (West Germany) Katja Ebbinghaus
14. (Austria) Sonja Pachta

== Qualifying draw ==
Key

- Q = Qualifier
- WC = Wild card
- LL = Lucky loser
- Alt = Alternate
- ITF = ITF entry
- PR = Protected ranking
- SR = Special ranking
- SE = Special exempt
- JE = Junior exempt
- JR = Junior Accelerator Programme entrant
- CO = College Accelerator Programme entrant
- NG = Next Gen Accelerator Program entrant
- w/o = Walkover
- r = Retired
- d = Defaulted

=== First qualifier ===
First round			Qualifying competition
			(Hungary) Katalin Borka	6	6
			(France) Nicole Niox-Château	4	1
(France) Nicole Niox-Château	6	6	(France) Nicole Niox-Château	4	1
(United States) Shari Barman	2	3

=== Second qualifier ===
First round			Qualifying competition
			(South Africa) Janine Lieffrig	1	7
			(South Africa) Joan Koudelka	6	9
(South Africa) Joan Koudelka	6	6	(South Africa) Joan Koudelka	6	9
(France) Jacqueline Berson	0	2

=== Third qualifier ===
First round		Qualifying competition
		(Chile) Ana María Arias
		(France) Anne-Marie Rouchon	w/o
(France) Anne-Marie Rouchon		(France) Anne-Marie Rouchon	w/o
(France) Aline Nenot	w/o

=== Fourth qualifier ===
First round				Qualifying competition
				(France) Michele Mizen	w/o
				(South Africa) Sharon Van Brandis
(South Africa) Sharon Van Brandis	6	3	6	(South Africa) Sharon Van Brandis
(France) Sylvie Pruvot	0	6	4

=== Fifth qualifier ===
First round		Qualifying competition
		(Indonesia) Lany Kaligis
		(France) Chantal Langanay	w/o
(France) Chantal Langanay		(France) Chantal Langanay	w/o
(France) Maylis Burel	w/o

=== Sixth qualifier ===
First round			Qualifying competition
			(United Kingdom) Frances Taylor	3	5
			(South Africa) Daphne Botha	6	7
(South Africa) Daphne Botha	6	6	(South Africa) Daphne Botha	6	7
(Japan) Yaeko Matsuda	1	3

=== Seventh qualifier ===
First round
(United States) Becky Vest	6	7
(France) Marie-Christine Brochard	4	5
(United States) Ching-Ling Chang	6	6
(Sweden) Madeleine Pegel	3	4

Qualifying competition
(United States) Becky Vest	9	6
(United States) Ching-Ling Chang	7	0

=== Eighth qualifier ===
First round
(India) Kumarani Ranga-Rao	0	0
(Finland) Birgitta Lindström	6	6
(France) Dominique Beillan	1	0
(Colombia) Isabel Fernández de Soto	6	6

Qualifying competition
(Finland) Birgitta Lindström	5	6	3
(Colombia) Isabel Fernández de Soto	7	4	6

=== Ninth qualifier ===
First round				Qualifying competition
(France) T. Novaco	0	6	3
(Japan) Junko Sawamatsu	6	2	6
(Japan) Junko Sawamatsu	6	2	6	(Japan) Junko Sawamatsu	0	4
				(France) Nathalie Fuchs	6	6

=== Tenth qualifier ===
First round			Qualifying competition
(Austria) Maria Hollingsworth	1	3
(France) Claudine Rouire	6	6
(France) Claudine Rouire	6	6	(France) Claudine Rouire	8	1	2
			(Australia) Wendy Gilchrist	6	6	6

=== Eleventh qualifier ===
First round		Qualifying competition
(France) Irène Isse	w/o
(France) Johanne Venturino
(France) Johanne Venturino		(France) Johanne Venturino	w/o
		(France) Françoise Repoux

=== Twelfth qualifier ===
First round			Qualifying competition
(France) Jacqueline Le Boubenec	1	2
(Belgium) Michèle Gurdal	6	6
(Belgium) Michèle Gurdal	6	6	(Belgium) Michèle Gurdal	1	4
			(Argentina) Raquel Giscafré	6	6

=== Thirteenth qualifier ===
First round			Qualifying competition
(France) Florence Guédy	4	1
(West Germany) Katja Ebbinghaus	6	6
(West Germany) Katja Ebbinghaus	6	6	(West Germany) Katja Ebbinghaus	6	7
			(Chile) Michelle Rodríguez	4	5

=== Fourteenth qualifier ===
First round			Qualifying competition
(France) Anne-Marie Cassaigne	2	1
(Austria) Sonja Pachta	6	6
(Austria) Sonja Pachta	6	6	(Austria) Sonja Pachta
			(France) Nicole Bîmes	w/o
