= 1971 French Open – Mixed doubles =

Mixed doubles
- 1971 French Open

Final
- Champion: (France) Jean-Claude Barclay (France) Françoise Dürr
- Runner-up: (Soviet Union) Toomas Leius (United Kingdom) Winnie Shaw
- Score: 6–2, 6–4

Details
- Draw: 35
- Seeds: 4

Events
Singles	men	women		boys	girls
Doubles	men	women	mixed	boys	girls
WC Singles	men	women	quad
WC Doubles	men	women	quad
Legends	−45	45+	women
- French Open

Bob Hewitt and Billie Jean King were the defending champions but both players chose not to participate.

Jean-Claude Barclay and Françoise Dürr won in the final 6–2, 6–4 against Toomas Leius and Winnie Shaw.

== Seeds ==
1. (United States) Marty Riessen / (Australia) Margaret Court (withdrew)
2. (France) Jean-Claude Barclay / (France) Françoise Dürr (champions)
3. (Soviet Union) Alex Metreveli / (Soviet Union) Olga Morozova (semifinals)
4. (Australia) Bob Carmichael / (France) Gail Chanfreau (semifinals)

== Draw ==
Key

- Q = Qualifier
- WC = Wild card
- LL = Lucky loser
- Alt = Alternate
- ITF = ITF entry
- PR = Protected ranking
- SR = Special ranking
- SE = Special exempt
- JE = Junior exempt
- JR = Junior Accelerator Programme entrant
- CO = College Accelerator Programme entrant
- NG = Next Gen Accelerator Program entrant
- w/o = Walkover
- r = Retired
- d = Defaulted

=== Finals ===
Quarterfinals
2	(France) Jean-Claude Barclay (France) Françoise Dürr	6	6
(Australia) Bill Bowrey (Australia) Lesley Bowrey	2	2
3	(Soviet Union) Alex Metreveli (Soviet Union) Olga Morozova	6	6
(Australia) Dick Crealy (Australia) Lesley Hunt	3	4
(United States) Frank Froehling (Australia) Wendy Gilchrist
4	(Australia) Bob Carmichael (France) Gail Chanfreau	w/o
(Soviet Union) Toomas Leius (United Kingdom) Winnie Shaw	6	6
(France) Bernard Montrenaud (South Africa) Janine Lieffrig	0	3

Semifinals
2	(France) Jean-Claude Barclay (France) Françoise Dürr	6	9
3	(Soviet Union) Alex Metreveli (Soviet Union) Olga Morozova	3	7
4	(Australia) Bob Carmichael (France) Gail Chanfreau	9	2
(Soviet Union) Toomas Leius (United Kingdom) Winnie Shaw	11	6

Final
2	(France) Jean-Claude Barclay (France) Françoise Dürr	6	6
(Soviet Union) Toomas Leius (United Kingdom) Winnie Shaw	2	4

=== Top half ===
==== Section 1 ====
First round

Second round
2	(France) J-C Barclay (France) F Dürr	6	6
(Japan) J Kamiwazumi (Japan) Y Matsuda	2	3
(United States) B Seewagen (United States) K Pigeon
(France) D Grozdanovitch (France) F Guédy	w/o
(Australia) B Bowrey (Australia) L Bowrey	6	7
(Romania) S Mureșan (France) O de Roubin	3	5
(Soviet Union) V Egorov (France) R Darmon	6	6
(Ecuador) E Zuleta (Sweden) M Pegel	2	3

Third round
2	(France) J-C Barclay (France) F Dürr	6	6
(France) D Grozdanovitch (France) F Guédy	3	0
(Australia) B Bowrey (Australia) L Bowrey	6	6
(Soviet Union) V Egorov (France) R Darmon	2	4

Quarterfinals
2	(France) J-C Barclay (France) F Dürr	6	6
(Australia) B Bowrey (Australia) L Bowrey	2	2

==== Section 2 ====
First round
(Hungary) S Baranyi (Hungary) J Szörényi
(France) A Bouteleux (France) D Bouteleux	w/o
(Japan) T Koura (Japan) K Sawamatsu	w/o
(France) P Dominguez (Uruguay) F Bonicelli

Second round
3	(Soviet Union) A Metreveli (Soviet Union) O Morozova	6	2	6
(France) B De Troye (France) C Rouire	1	6	2
(Brazil) JE Mandarino (Spain) C Mandarino	6	6
(France) T Bernasconi (France) N Fuchs	4	0
(Australia) D Crealy (Australia) L Hunt	6	6
(France) F Battegay (United States) B Vest	3	2
(France) A Bouteleux (France) D Bouteleux	w/o
(Japan) T Koura (Japan) K Sawamatsu

Third round
3	(Soviet Union) A Metreveli (Soviet Union) O Morozova	6	6
(Brazil) JE Mandarino (Spain) C Mandarino	4	0
(Australia) D Crealy (Australia) L Hunt	6	6
(France) A Bouteleux (France) D Bouteleux	1	1

Quarterfinals
3	(Soviet Union) A Metreveli (Soviet Union) O Morozova	6	6
(Australia) D Crealy (Australia) L Hunt	3	4

=== Bottom half ===
==== Section 3 ====
First round
(France) C Boutard (United States) P Austin	w/o
(Chile) JR Pinto Bravo (Chile) AM Pinto Bravo

Second round
(France) C Boutard (United States) P Austin	w/o
(South Africa) B Bertram (South Africa) E Emmanuel
(Italy) P Marzano (Italy) D Porzio	1	3
(United States) F Froehling (Australia) W Gilchrist	6	6
(Soviet Union) P Lamp (Finland) B Lindström	6	6	3
(Colombia) J Velasco (Colombia) I Fernández de Soto	8	4	6
(Romania) S Dron (United Kingdom) M Greenwood
4	(Australia) B Carmichael (France) G Chanfreau	w/o

Third round
(France) C Boutard (United States) P Austin
(United States) F Froehling (Australia) W Gilchrist	w/o
(Colombia) J Velasco (Colombia) I Fernández de Soto
4	(Australia) B Carmichael (France) G Chanfreau	w/o

Quarterfinals
(United States) F Froehling (Australia) W Gilchrist
4	(Australia) B Carmichael (France) G Chanfreau	w/o

==== Section 4 ====
First round

Second round
(Chile) P Cornejo (Chile) M Rodríguez	6	7
(Japan) T Sakai (Japan) J Sawamatsu	3	5
(France) P Joly (United States) S Barman
(Soviet Union) T Leius (United Kingdom) W Shaw	w/o
(France) B Montrenaud (South Africa) J Lieffrig	4	6	7
(Colombia) I Molina (Argentina) R Giscafré	6	2	5
(Switzerland) D Sturdza (Austria) M Hollingsworth
1	(United States) M Riessen (Australia) M Court	w/o

Third round
(Chile) P Cornejo (Chile) M Rodríguez	6	4	4
(Soviet Union) T Leius (United Kingdom) W Shaw	2	6	6
(France) B Montrenaud (South Africa) J Lieffrig	w/o
1	(United States) M Riessen (Australia) M Court

Quarterfinals
(Soviet Union) T Leius (United Kingdom) W Shaw	6	6
(France) B Montrenaud (South Africa) J Lieffrig	0	3
