= Peeter Lamp =

Estonian tennis player and coach

- Country (sports): Soviet Union
- Born: 9 February 1944 (age 81); Tartu, Estonia
- Height: 188 cm (6 ft 2 in)

Singles

Grand Slam singles results
- French Open: 1R (1971)

Doubles

Grand Slam doubles results
- French Open: 2R (1971)

Grand Slam mixed doubles results
- French Open: 2R (1971)

Peeter Lamp (born 9 February 1944) is an Estonian tennis coach and former professional tennis player.

Born and raised in Tartu, Lamp was a two-time singles champion at the Estonian Tennis Championships and featured in main draws at the 1971 French Open. He lost in the first round of the singles to Bernard Montrenaud in five sets.

Lamp, who has captained Estonia in the Davis Cup, was the coach of Anett Kontaveit in 2013 and 2014.
