= 1971 French Open – Men's doubles =

Men's doubles
- 1971 French Open

Final
- Champion: (United States) Arthur Ashe (United States) Marty Riessen
- Runner-up: (United States) Tom Gorman (United States) Stan Smith
- Score: 6–8, 4–6, 6–3, 6–4, 11–9

Details
- Draw: 76
- Seeds: 8

Events
Singles	men	women		boys	girls
Doubles	men	women	mixed	boys	girls
WC Singles	men	women	quad
WC Doubles	men	women	quad
Legends	−45	45+	women
← 1970 ·	French Open	· 1972 →

Ilie Năstase and Ion Țiriac were the defending champions but they withdrew from the tournament.

Arthur Ashe and Marty Riessen won in the final 6–8, 4–6, 6–3, 6–4, 11–9 against Tom Gorman and Stan Smith.

== Seeds ==
1. (Romania) Ilie Năstase / (Romania) Ion Țiriac (withdrew)
2. (United States) Arthur Ashe / (United States) Marty Riessen (champions)
3. (United States) Bob Lutz / (United States) Charlie Pasarell (quarterfinals)
4. (United States) Tom Gorman / (United States) Stan Smith (final)
5. (Czechoslovakia) Jan Kodeš / (Czechoslovakia) Vladimír Zedník (third round)
6. (Australia) Dick Crealy / (Australia) Allan Stone (fourth round)
7. (Australia) John Alexander / (Australia) Phil Dent (fourth round)
8. (Soviet Union) Alex Metreveli / (United States) Cliff Richey (quarterfinals)

== Draw ==
=== Key ===
- Q = Qualifier
- WC = Wild card
- LL = Lucky loser
- Alt = Alternate
- ITF = ITF entry
- PR = Protected ranking
- SR = Special ranking
- SE = Special exempt
- JE = Junior exempt
- JR = Junior Accelerator Programme entrant
- CO = College Accelerator Programme entrant
- NG = Next Gen Accelerator Program entrant
- w/o = Walkover
- r = Retired
- d = Defaulted

=== Finals ===
Quarterfinals
2	(United States) Arthur Ashe (United States) Marty Riessen	1	7	8	6
(Chile) Patricio Cornejo (Chile) Jaime Fillol	6	5	6	3
3	(United States) Bob Lutz (United States) Charlie Pasarell	4	1	4
(New Zealand) Brian Fairlie (South Africa) Frew McMillan	6	6	6
(Australia) Bill Bowrey (South Africa) Bob Maud	9	5	2	7	4
4	(United States) Tom Gorman (United States) Stan Smith	7	7	6	5	6
8	(Soviet Union) Alex Metreveli (United States) Cliff Richey	3	2	2
(Australia) Bob Carmichael (Australia) Ray Ruffels	6	6	6

Semifinals
2	(United States) Arthur Ashe (United States) Marty Riessen	6	6	2	3	8
(New Zealand) Brian Fairlie (South Africa) Frew McMillan	3	3	6	6	6
4	(United States) Tom Gorman (United States) Stan Smith	6	6	6
(Australia) Bob Carmichael (Australia) Ray Ruffels	4	4	4

Final
2	(United States) Arthur Ashe (United States) Marty Riessen	6	4	6	6	11
4	(United States) Tom Gorman (United States) Stan Smith	8	6	3	4	9

=== Top half ===
==== Section 1 ====
First round

Second round
2	(United States) A Ashe (United States) M Riessen	w/o
(Pakistan) MA Ilahi (India) J Mukerjea
(Romania) S Dron (Romania) P Mărmureanu	6	6	6
(Italy) V Franchitti (Italy) S Palmieri	1	1	4
(Colombia) I Molina (Colombia) J Velasco	w/o
(France) A Bouteleux (France) M Leclercq
(Italy) M Di Domenico (Italy) A Panatta	6	6	6
(Colombia) W Álvarez (France) P Darmon	1	3	1

Third round
2	(United States) A Ashe (United States) M Riessen	3	8	6	6
(Romania) S Dron (Romania) P Mărmureanu	6	6	2	1
(Colombia) I Molina (Colombia) J Velasco	6	6	3	4	6
(Italy) M Di Domenico (Italy) A Panatta	4	3	6	6	4

Fourth round
2	(United States) A Ashe (United States) M Riessen	6	13	8
(Colombia) I Molina (Colombia) J Velasco	2	11	6

==== Section 2 ====
First round

Second round
7	(Australia) J Alexander (Australia) P Dent	6	6	6
(France) J-C Fauvet (France) É Loliée	2	4	3
(Soviet Union) T Lejus (Soviet Union) A Volkov	6	1	6	6	7
(France) T Bernasconi (France) P Dominguez	8	6	2	1	5
(Chile) P Cornejo (Chile) J Fillol	7	4	6	6
(Italy) E Di Matteo (Italy) A Zugarelli	5	6	2	4
(Australia) I Fletcher (Australia) B Phillips-Moore	6	6	6
(Hungary) P Szőke (Hungary) G Varga	1	3	2

Third round
7	(Australia) J Alexander (Australia) P Dent	6	6	6
(Soviet Union) T Lejus (Soviet Union) A Volkov	3	1	1
(Chile) P Cornejo (Chile) J Fillol	w/o
(Australia) I Fletcher (Australia) B Phillips-Moore

Fourth round
7	(Australia) J Alexander (Australia) P Dent	5	1	6	4
(Chile) P Cornejo (Chile) J Fillol	7	6	3	6

==== Section 3 ====
First round

Second round
3	(United States) B Lutz (United States) C Pasarell	6	6	1	6
(Australia) A Gardiner (Italy) P Marzano	1	3	6	4
(Australia) J Bartlett (Australia) G Perkins
(New Zealand) O Parun (Socialist Federal Republic of Yugoslavia) N Špear	w/o
(Denmark) J Leschly (South Africa) R Moore	6	6	6
(Belgium) E Drossart (Austria) P Pokorny	3	3	3
(Japan) K Hirai (Japan) J Kuki	6	0	3	1
(France) J-C Barclay (France) D Contet	1	6	6	6

Third round
3	(United States) B Lutz (United States) C Pasarell	3	6	6	6
(New Zealand) O Parun (Socialist Federal Republic of Yugoslavia) N Špear	6	1	3	4
(Denmark) J Leschly (South Africa) R Moore	6	3	6	10
(France) J-C Barclay (France) D Contet	4	6	4	8

Fourth round
3	(United States) B Lutz (United States) C Pasarell	6	3	10	6	6
(Denmark) J Leschly (South Africa) R Moore	8	6	8	4	4

==== Section 4 ====
First round
(Greece) N Kalogeropoulos (Chile) JR Pinto Bravo	6	6	8
(France) C Boutard (France) J-P Olivier	3	3	6
(Australia) S Ball (Australia) G Masters	6	7	6
(France) É Deblicker (France) J Thamin	3	5	1
(New Zealand) B Fairlie (South Africa) F McMillan	6	6	6
(United Kingdom) D Segal (United States) J Zwieg	0	0	0
(Australia) J Cooper (Australia) C Dibley	6	6	6
(Canada) L Grinnan (Brazil) LC Moreira	3	2	0
(Soviet Union) P Lamp (Soviet Union) H Sepp	6	6	6
(Colombia) U Oquendo (Brazil) O Piva	1	4	2
(United States) F Froehling (United States) J McManus	2	6	6	6
(United States) N Perry (Ecuador) E Zuleta	6	1	2	2

Second round
6	(Australia) D Crealy (Australia) A Stone	6	6	6
(Japan) J Kawamori (Japan) T Koura	3	3	1
(Greece) N Kalogeropoulos (Chile) JR Pinto Bravo	6	6	3	2	4
(Australia) S Ball (Australia) G Masters	4	4	6	6	6
(New Zealand) B Fairlie (South Africa) F McMillan	6	6	6
(Australia) J Cooper (Australia) C Dibley	3	2	2
(Soviet Union) P Lamp (Soviet Union) H Sepp	3	9	3
(United States) F Froehling (United States) J McManus	6	11	6

Third round
6	(Australia) D Crealy (Australia) A Stone	6	7	6
(Australia) S Ball (Australia) G Masters	4	5	2
(New Zealand) B Fairlie (South Africa) F McMillan	6	6	6
(United States) F Froehling (United States) J McManus	4	2	3

Fourth round
6	(Australia) D Crealy (Australia) A Stone	4	5	6	6	2
(New Zealand) B Fairlie (South Africa) F McMillan	6	7	2	4	6

=== Bottom half ===
==== Section 5 ====
First round
(France) J-P Bombardier (France) B De Troye	3	3	3
(Hungary) S Baranyi (Hungary) R Machán	6	6	6
(United Kingdom) C Bovett (United States) B Seewagen	2	6	8	6
(France) G Goven (France) P Proisy	6	4	6	4
(Italy) F Bartoni (Italy) P Toci	w/o
(Socialist Federal Republic of Yugoslavia) B Jovanović (South Africa) D Schroder
(France) D Charlet (France) D Grozdanovitch	4	0	4
(Socialist Federal Republic of Yugoslavia) Ž Franulović (South Africa) T Ryan	6	6	6
(France) J-P Courcol (France) B Montrenaud	6	5	6	6
(Australia) R Case (Australia) F Sedgman	2	7	3	2
(Australia) B Bowrey (South Africa) B Maud	6	8	6
(Spain) J Gisbert (Spain) J Guerrero	2	6	1

Second round
(Hungary) S Baranyi (Hungary) R Machán	3	6	5	6	6
(United Kingdom) C Bovett (United States) B Seewagen	6	1	7	3	3
(Italy) F Bartoni (Italy) P Toci	0	3	2
(Socialist Federal Republic of Yugoslavia) Ž Franulović (South Africa) T Ryan	6	6	6
(France) J-P Courcol (France) B Montrenaud	6	2	6	2
(Australia) B Bowrey (South Africa) B Maud	8	6	3	6
(Indonesia) G Widjojo (Indonesia) A Wijono	6	3	7	5
5	(Czechoslovakia) J Kodeš (Czechoslovakia) V Zedník	4	6	9	7

Third round
(Hungary) S Baranyi (Hungary) R Machán	3	4	3
(Socialist Federal Republic of Yugoslavia) Ž Franulović (South Africa) T Ryan	6	6	6
(Australia) B Bowrey (South Africa) B Maud	3	2	6	6	10
5	(Czechoslovakia) J Kodeš (Czechoslovakia) V Zedník	6	6	4	3	8

Fourth round
(Socialist Federal Republic of Yugoslavia) Ž Franulović (South Africa) T Ryan	7	3	4	2
(Australia) B Bowrey (South Africa) B Maud	5	6	6	6

==== Section 6 ====
First round

Second round
(Czechoslovakia) J Hřebec (Czechoslovakia) F Pála	5	6	11	4
(France) P Barthès (France) J-B Chanfreau	7	2	13	6
(Greece) P Gavrilidis (Soviet Union) T Kakulia	0	1	4
(Brazil) T Koch (Brazil) JE Mandarino	6	6	6
(France) J-P Meyer (France) W N'Godrella	1	3	5
(Italy) G Majoli (Italy) N Pietrangeli	6	6	7
(France) P Beust (France) B Paul	5	4	2
4	(United States) T Gorman (United States) S Smith	7	6	6

Third round
(France) P Barthès (France) J-B Chanfreau	3	6	7	0	8
(Brazil) T Koch (Brazil) JE Mandarino	6	3	5	6	6
(Italy) G Majoli (Italy) N Pietrangeli	3	6	2	10	4
4	(United States) T Gorman (United States) S Smith	6	2	6	8	6

Fourth round
(France) P Barthès (France) J-B Chanfreau	4	3	6
4	(United States) T Gorman (United States) S Smith	6	6	8

==== Section 7 ====
First round

Second round
(South Africa) B Bertram (South Africa) W Freer	8	4	6	4
(France) F Jauffret (France) J-L Rouyer	10	6	3	6
(Romania) S Mureșan (Switzerland) D Sturdza	4	2	2
(Australia) T Addison (Czechoslovakia) M Holeček	6	6	6
(Poland) W Gąsiorek (Poland) T Nowicki	w/o
(Spain) JL Arilla (Spain) A Muñoz
(Netherlands) P van Min (United States) J Ward
8	(Soviet Union) A Metreveli (United States) C Richey	w/o

Third round
(France) F Jauffret (France) J-L Rouyer	5	7	5	4
(Australia) T Addison (Czechoslovakia) M Holeček	7	5	7	6
(Poland) W Gąsiorek (Poland) T Nowicki	5	7	9	2	2
8	(Soviet Union) A Metreveli (United States) C Richey	7	5	7	6	6

Fourth round
(Australia) T Addison (Czechoslovakia) M Holeček	4	6	11	1	2
8	(Soviet Union) A Metreveli (United States) C Richey	6	2	9	6	6

==== Section 8 ====
First round

Second round
(Italy) C Barazzutti (Italy) R Lombardi	2	4	8
(Soviet Union) V Egorov (Soviet Union) V Korotkov	6	6	10
(France) F Battegay (France) P Joly	1	5	7
(Australia) B Carmichael (Australia) R Ruffels	6	7	9
(South Africa) P Cramer (Rhodesia) A Pattison	6	3	4	2
(Japan) J Kamiwazumi (Japan) T Sakai	2	6	6	6
(United States) C. Spalding (United States) K West	w/o
1	(Romania) I Năstase (Romania) I Țiriac

Third round
(Soviet Union) V Egorov (Soviet Union) V Korotkov	3	4	4
(Australia) B Carmichael (Australia) R Ruffels	6	6	6
(Japan) J Kamiwazumi (Japan) T Sakai	6	6	6
(United States) C. Spalding (United States) K West	0	2	1

Fourth round
(Australia) B Carmichael (Australia) R Ruffels	6	6	6
(Japan) J Kamiwazumi (Japan) T Sakai	3	2	2
