= José Guerrero (tennis) =

Spanish tennis player

- Country (sports): Spain

Singles
- Career record: 68-91
- Career titles: 1
- Highest ranking: No. 241 (29 July 1974)

Grand Slam singles results
- French Open: 2R (1971)

Doubles
- Career record: 3–10

Grand Slam doubles results
- French Open: 1R (1971)
Medal record
Mediterranean Games
Silver medal – second place	1971 Izmir	Men's Doubles

José Guerrero is a Spanish former professional tennis player.

In the 1968 Real Madrid International, he defeated Mike Sangster in straight sets in the third round, losing to Juan Couder in the fourth round. At the 1969 Macomber Cup, he defeated Patrick Proisy, a later finalist at the French Open, in the quarterfinal in a close match, losing the semifinal to Karl Meiler. At the Manly Seaside Championships in 1969 he defeated Colin Dibley in the second round in a close match.

In 1970 he defeated Juan Couder in five sets in the second round at the Barcelona Open Conde de Godo tournament, but lost in the next round to Manuel Santana.

Guerrero featured in the main draw of the 1971 French Open, where he was beaten in the second round by sixth seed Stan Smith.

He competed on the Grand Prix tennis circuit during the 1970s and took a set off the world's top ranked player Ilie Năstase in Madrid in 1973.
