= Kuhlmey =

Kuhlmey may refer to:

- Detachment Kuhlmey, temporary unit of the German Luftwaffe during World War II
- Kurt Kuhlmey (1913–1993), one of the most famous Stuka pilots of World War II
- Rainer Kuhlmey, retired German tennis player
