= 1971 French Open – Women's doubles =

Women's doubles
- 1971 French Open

Final
- Champion: (France) Gail Chanfreau (France) Françoise Dürr
- Runner-up: (Australia) Helen Gourlay (Australia) Kerry Harris
- Score: 6–4, 6–1

Details
- Draw: 34
- Seeds: 4

Events
Singles	men	women		boys	girls
Doubles	men	women	mixed	boys	girls
WC Singles	men	women	quad
WC Doubles	men	women	quad
Legends	−45	45+	women
← 1970 ·	French Open	· 1972 →

The women's doubles tournament at the 1971 French Open was held from 24 May to 6 June 1971 on the outdoor clay courts at the Stade Roland Garros in Paris, France. The first-seeded team of Gail Chanfreau and Françoise Dürr won the title, defeating the unseeded pair of Helen Gourlay and Kerry Harris in the final in straight sets.

== Seeds ==
1. (France) Gail Chanfreau / (France) Françoise Dürr (champions)
2. (Australia) Margaret Court / (Australia) Evonne Goolagong (semifinal)
3. (Soviet Union) Olga Morozova / (United Kingdom) Virginia Wade (third round)
4. (United States) Nancy Richey / (United States) Kerry Melville (third round)

== Draw ==
=== Key ===
- Q = Qualifier
- WC = Wild card
- LL = Lucky loser
- Alt = Alternate
- ITF = ITF entry
- PR = Protected ranking
- SR = Special ranking
- SE = Special exempt
- JE = Junior exempt
- JR = Junior Accelerator Programme entrant
- CO = College Accelerator Programme entrant
- NG = Next Gen Accelerator Program entrant
- w/o = Walkover
- r = Retired
- d = Defaulted

=== Finals ===
Semifinals
(Australia) Helen Gourlay (Australia) Kerry Harris	W	O
2	(Australia) Margaret Court (Australia) Evonne Goolagong
1	(France) Gail Chanfreau (France) Françoise Dürr	6	6
(Australia) Lesley Bowrey (Australia) Lesley Hunt	4	2

Final
(Australia) Helen Gourlay (Australia) Kerry Harris	4	1
1	(France) Gail Chanfreau (France) Françoise Dürr	6	6

=== Top half ===
==== Section 1 ====
First round

Second round
(Finland) Birgitta Lindström (Sweden) Eva Wennerström	0	0
2	(Australia) Margaret Court (Australia) Evonne Goolagong	6	6
(United Kingdom) Jill Cooper (United Kingdom) M Greenwood
(Argentina) Raquel Giscafré (Argentina) Ana María Arias	W-O
(Czechoslovakia) M Holubová (Hungary) Marie Pinterová
(Italy) Lea Pericoli (United States) Pam Teeguarden	W	O
(United States) Tory Ann Fretz (Australia) Wendy Gilchrist	4	6	5
(Uruguay) Fiorella Bonicelli (Colombia) I Fernandez-De Soto	6	3	7

Third round
2	(Australia) Margaret Court (Australia) Evonne Goolagong	6	6
(Argentina) Raquel Giscafré (Argentina) Ana María Arias	1	3
(Italy) Lea Pericoli (United States) Pam Teeguarden
(Uruguay) Fiorella Bonicelli (Colombia) I Fernandez-De Soto	W	O

Quarterfinals
2	(Australia) Margaret Court (Australia) Evonne Goolagong	W	O
(Uruguay) Fiorella Bonicelli (Colombia) I Fernandez-De Soto

==== Section 2 ====
First round
(Indonesia) Lany Kaligis (Indonesia) Lita Sugiarto	6	6
(France) Odile de Roubin (Sweden) Madeleine Pegel	3	4

Second round
(Austria) M Hollingsworth (France) N Niox-Château
3	(Soviet Union) Olga Morozova (United Kingdom) Virginia Wade	W	O
(France) A-M Cassaigne (France) Sylvie Rual	1	0
(Netherlands) Marijke Schaar (Netherlands) Gertruida Walhof	6	6
(Japan) Junko Sawamatsu (Japan) Kazuko Sawamatsu	0	2
(United States) Julie Heldman (United States) Valerie Ziegenfuss	6	6
(Indonesia) Lany Kaligis (Indonesia) Lita Sugiarto	3	9	5
(Australia) Helen Gourlay (Australia) Kerry Harris	6	7	7

Third round
3	(Soviet Union) Olga Morozova (United Kingdom) Virginia Wade
(Netherlands) Marijke Schaar (Netherlands) Gertruida Walhof	W	O
(United States) Julie Heldman (United States) Valerie Ziegenfuss	2	3
(Australia) Helen Gourlay (Australia) Kerry Harris	6	6

Quarterfinals
(Netherlands) Marijke Schaar (Netherlands) Gertruida Walhof	2	2
(Australia) Helen Gourlay (Australia) Kerry Harris	6	6

=== Bottom half ===
==== Section 3 ====
First round
(United States) Pam Austin (United States) Linda Tuero	6	6
(United States) Ching-Ling Chang (Japan) Yaeko Matsuda	2	3

Second round
(United States) Pam Austin (United States) Linda Tuero	6	4	3
(France) Rosie Darmon (France) Janine Lieffrig	3	6	6
(Spain) Carmen Mandarino (Chile) Michelle Rodríguez	1	2
(Australia) Lesley Bowrey (Australia) Lesley Hunt	6	6
(France) M-C Brochard (France) Nathalie Fuchs	3	1
(Sweden) Ingrid Bentzer (Sweden) Christina Sandberg	6	6
(Italy) A-M Nasuelli (Italy) Daniela Marzano	2	2
4	(United States) Nancy Richey (Australia) Kerry Reid	6	6

Third round
(France) Rosie Darmon (France) Janine Lieffrig	1	3
(Australia) Lesley Bowrey (Australia) Lesley Hunt	6	6
(Sweden) Ingrid Bentzer (Sweden) Christina Sandberg	3	6	6
4	(United States) Nancy Richey (Australia) Kerry Reid	6	4	0

Quarterfinals
(Australia) Lesley Bowrey (Australia) Lesley Hunt	6	8	6
(Sweden) Ingrid Bentzer (Sweden) Christina Sandberg	8	6	0

==== Section 4 ====
First round

Second round
(France) D Bouteleux (France) Claudine Rouire	1	1
(South Africa) Esmé Emmanuel (United States) Cecilia Martinez	6	6
(France) D Beillan (France) Florence Guédy	1	1
(United Kingdom) Winnie Shaw (Netherlands) Betty Stöve	6	6
(United States) Shari Barman (United States) Becky Vest	3	1
(South Africa) Brenda Kirk (South Africa) Laura Rossouw	6	6
(India) K Ranga-Rao (France) C Spinoza
1	(France) Gail Chanfreau (France) Françoise Dürr	W	O

Third round
(South Africa) Esmé Emmanuel (United States) Cecilia Martinez	3	1
(United Kingdom) Winnie Shaw (Netherlands) Betty Stöve	6	6
(South Africa) Brenda Kirk (South Africa) Laura Rossouw	0	1
1	(France) Gail Chanfreau (France) Françoise Dürr	6	6

Quarterfinals
(United Kingdom) Winnie Shaw (Netherlands) Betty Stöve	3	5
1	(France) Gail Chanfreau (France) Françoise Dürr	6	7
