= Dorothy Vest =

American tennis player

- Vest, from a 1956 newspaper
- Born: Dorothy Jean Crowe; May 10, 1919 near Brownsville, Texas, U.S.
- Died: January 7, 2013 (aged 93); Dallas, Texas, U.S.
- Occupations: Tennis player, coach
- Children: Becky Vest

Dorothy Jean Crowe Vest (May 10, 1919 – January 7, 2013) was an American tennis player and coach. From 1951 to 1981 she was Director of Tennis for the city of Jackson, Mississippi. Jackson's Dorothy Vest Tennis Center is named for her. She was inducted into the Mississippi Sports Hall of Fame in 1980.

== Early life ==
Crowe was born near Brownsville, Texas. The daughter of Carroll Crowe and Louise Austin Crowe.

== Career ==
During her sports career Vest participated in competitions which led to grand slam tennis events, and she was undefeated in mixed doubles with her partner Slew Hester. She also played in mixed doubles events with Nolan Touchstone, and women's doubles with Joan White and her own daughters. She competed in senior women's tennis events into the 1970s.

From 1951 to 1981 Dorothy Vest was Director of Tennis for the City of Jackson, where she not only coached the game but also supervised the building and operation of tennis facilities. She was director of the Mississippi State Open tennis tournament in 1956. In 1979 her family was selected for the United States Tennis Association's Ralph W. Westcott USTA Family of the Year Award, and in 1980 Dorothy Vest was inducted into the Mississippi Sports Hall of Fame. Jackson's Dorothy Vest Tennis Center is named for her. She was inducted into the Southern Tennis Hall of Fame in 1983 and the Mississippi Tennis Hall of Fame in 1990.

In retirement, Vest moved back to her hometown, Brownsville, Texas, and was active in Republican Party politics there.

== Personal life and legacy ==
Crowe married tennis coach and educator John William Vest in 1939. They had three children. Her husband died in 1981, and she died in 2013, at the age of 93, in Dallas. Her daughters Rebecca L. "Becky" Vest and Carol Ann Vest Dunn are both in the Mississippi Tennis Hall of Fame. The Mississippi Tennis Association annually gives a Dorothy Vest Award for the best male tennis player and the best female tennis player in Mississippi.
