= 1965 French Championships (tennis) =

- Date: 17–29 May 1965
- Edition: 64
- Category: 35th Grand Slam (ITF)
- Surface: Clay
- Location: Paris (XVI^{e}), France
- Venue: Stade Roland Garros

Champions

Men's singles
- (Australia) Fred Stolle

Women's singles
- (Australia) Lesley Turner

Men's doubles
- (Australia) Roy Emerson / (Australia) Fred Stolle

Women's doubles
- (Australia) Margaret Smith / (Australia) Lesley Turner

Mixed doubles
- (Australia) Margaret Smith / (Australia) Ken Fletcher
- French Championships

The 1965 French Championships (now known as the French Open) was a tennis tournament that took place on the outdoor clay courts at the Stade Roland-Garros in Paris, France. The tournament ran from 17 May until 29 May. It was the 64th staging of the French Championships, and the second Grand Slam tennis event of 1965. Fred Stolle and Lesley Turner won the singles titles.

== Finals ==
=== Men's singles ===
(Australia) Fred Stolle (AUS) defeated (Australia) Tony Roche (AUS) 3–6, 6–0, 6–2, 6–3

=== Women's singles ===
(Australia) Lesley Turner (AUS) defeated (Australia) Margaret Smith (AUS) 6–3, 6–4

=== Men's doubles ===
(Australia) Roy Emerson (AUS) / (Australia) Fred Stolle (AUS) defeated (Australia) Ken Fletcher (AUS) / (Australia) Bob Hewitt (AUS) 6–8, 6–3, 8–6, 6–2

=== Women's doubles ===
(Australia) Margaret Smith (AUS) / (Australia) Lesley Turner (AUS) defeated (France) Françoise Durr (FRA) / (France) Janine Lieffrig (FRA) 6–3, 6–1

=== Mixed doubles ===
(Australia) Margaret Smith (AUS) / (Australia) Ken Fletcher (AUS) defeated (Brazil) Maria Bueno (BRA) / (Australia) John Newcombe (AUS) 6–4, 6–4

Preceded by 1965 Australian Championships	Grand Slams	Succeeded by 1965 Wimbledon Championships
