= Theo Gorter =

Dutch tennis player (born 1956)

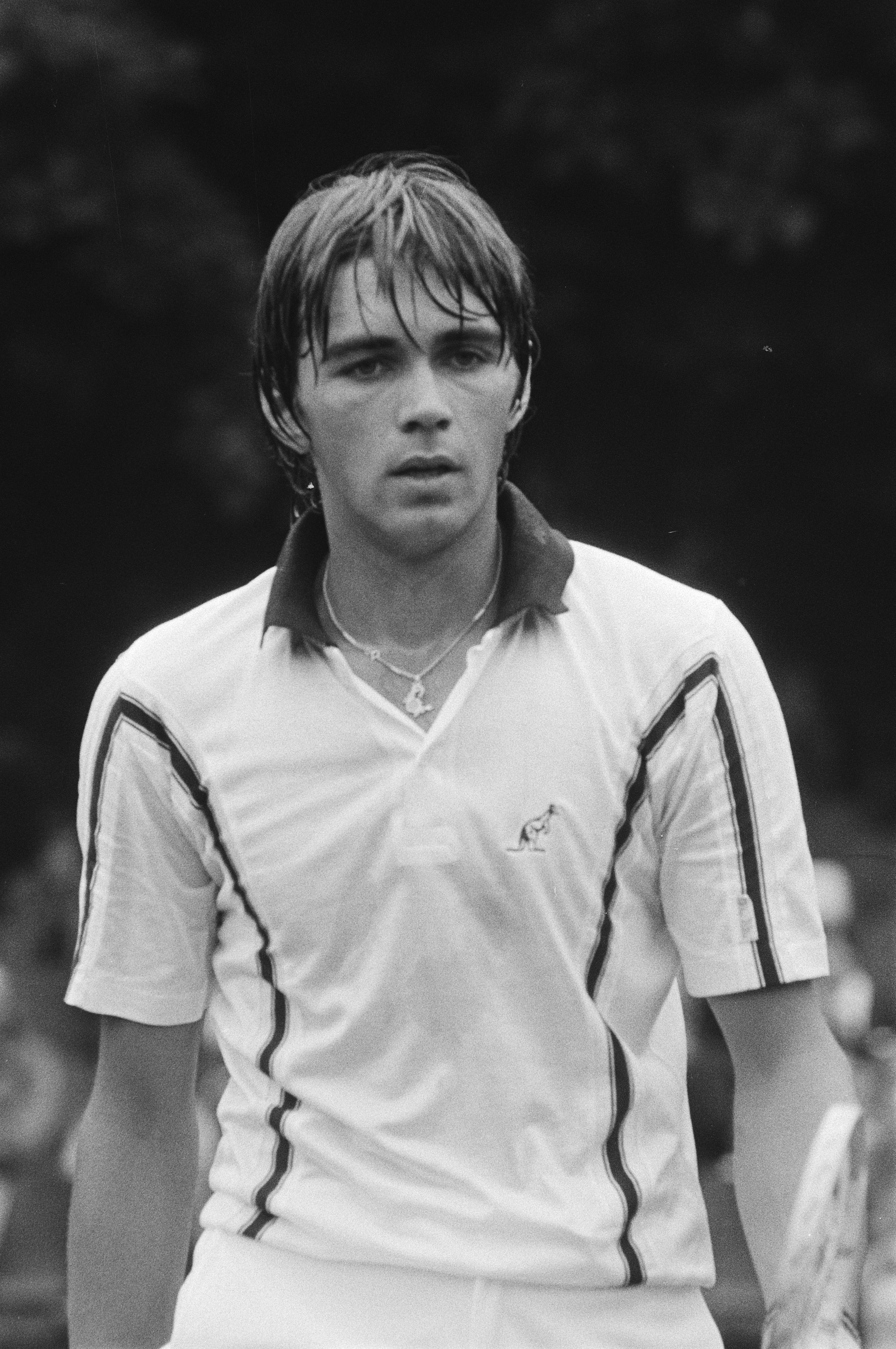
- Country (sports): Netherlands
- Born: 12 July 1956 (age 69)
- Plays: Left-handed

Singles
- Career record: 0–2
- Highest ranking: No. 392 (3 Jan 1979)

Doubles
- Career record: 2–6
- Highest ranking: No. 520 (26 Nov 1984)

Theo Gorter (born 12 July 1956) is a Dutch former professional tennis player.

A left-handed player from Amsterdam, Gorter's career almost ended when he was 18 year old, after suffering a broken tibia and crushed foot in a moped accident. His injuries kept him out of tennis for over a year.

Gorter, a three-time national doubles champion, represented the Netherlands in a 1979 Davis Cup tie against Denmark in Hilversum. He partnered with Paul van Min in the doubles rubber, which they lost in four sets to Lars Elvstrøm and Michael Mortensen, but the Netherlands still won the tie.

On the Grand Prix circuit, Gorter made the singles main draw of the Dutch Open in both 1979 and 1980.

== See also ==
- List of Netherlands Davis Cup team representatives
