= List of Netherlands Davis Cup team representatives =

This is a list of tennis players who have represented the Netherlands Davis Cup team in an official Davis Cup match. The Netherlands have taken part in the competition since 1920.

== Players ==
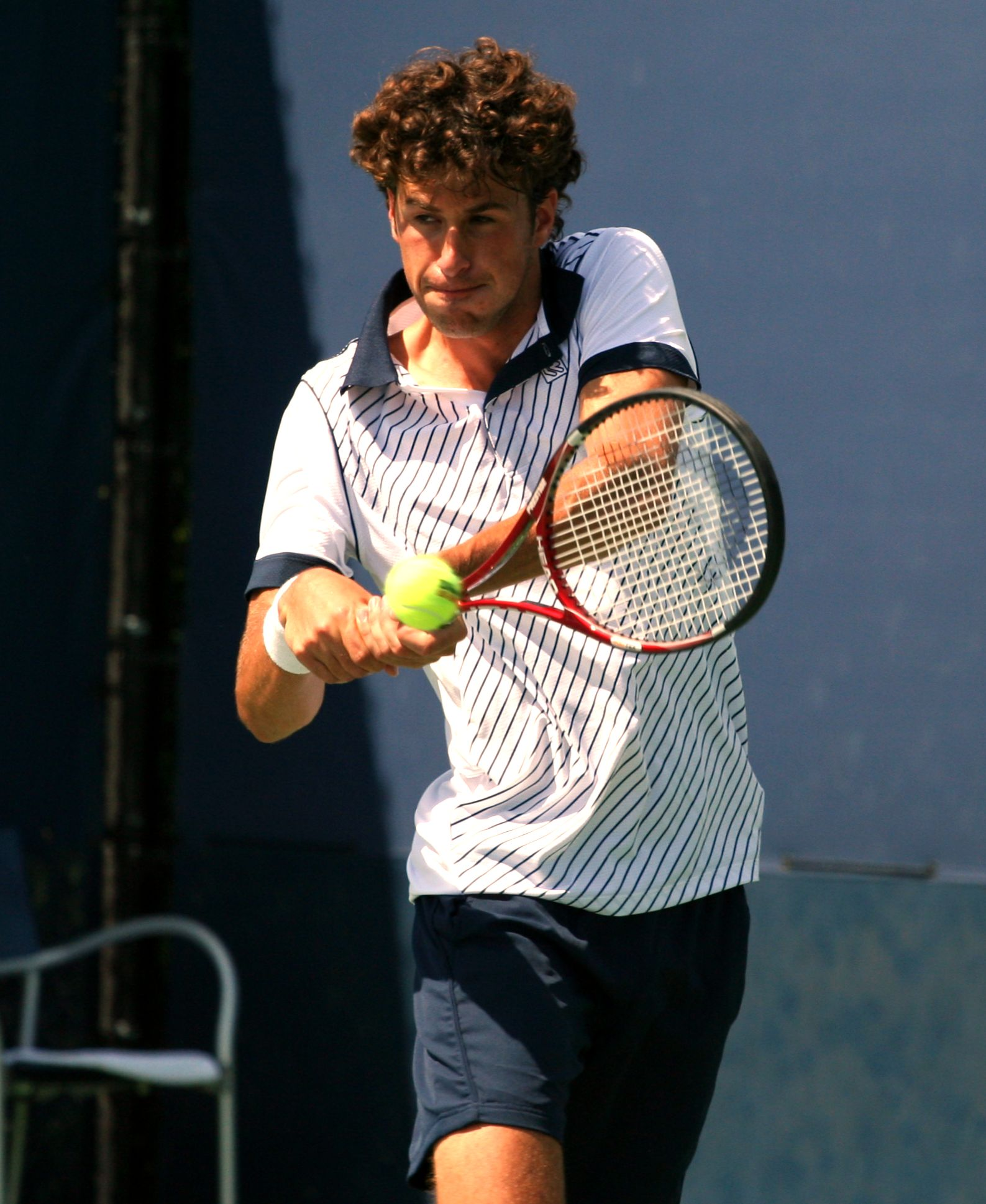
Robin Haase

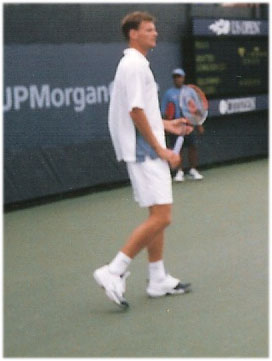
Sjeng Schalken

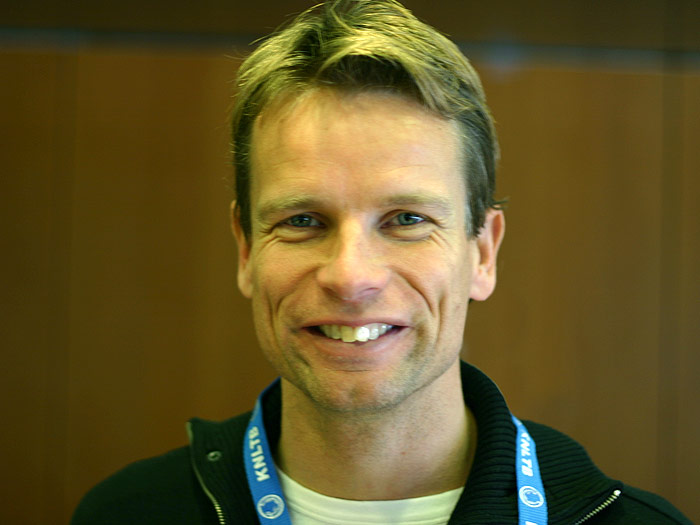
Jan Siemerink

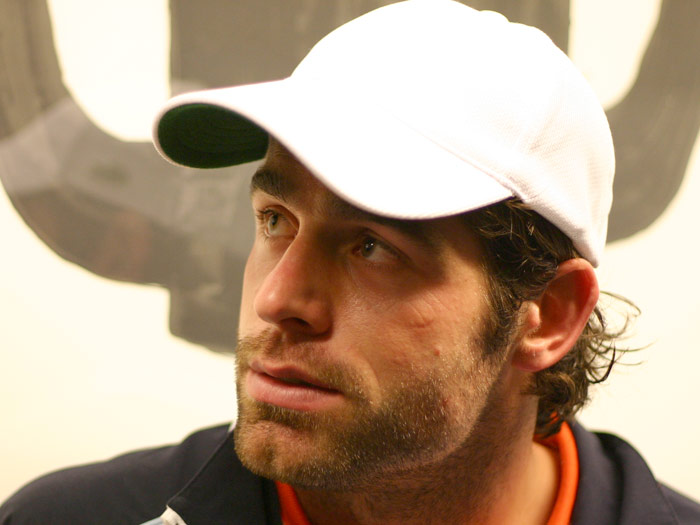
Raemon Sluiter

Player	W-L (Total)	W-L (Singles)	W-L (Doubles)	Ties	Debut
Marc Albert	1–3	0–1	1–2	3	1981
Cornelis Bryan	0–4	0–2	0–2	3	1923
Thiemo de Bakker	10–7	9–5	1–2	8	2008
Alfred Dehnert	8–10	5–7	3–3	6	1954
Arthur Diemer-Kool	25–13	13–11	12–2	15	1920
Paul Dogger	0–2	0–2	0–0	1	1988
Jacco Eltingh	10–6	2–4	8–2	11	1992
Niklaus Fleury	3–7	2–3	1–4	6	1969
Wouter Fok	3–1	1–1	2–0	2	1978
Hendrik Goris	0–1	0–1	0–0	1	1957
Theo Gorter	0–1	0–0	0–1	1	1980
Paul Haarhuis	31–18	15–8	16–10	27	1990
Robin Haase	16–9	14–5	2–4	10	2006
Jan Hajer	5–13	4–9	1–4	7	1964
Fred Hemmes Sr.	7–11	4–8	3–3	8	1971
Jan Hordijk	12–11	9–7	3–4	9	1969
Tod Hughan	4–18	1–15	3–3	8	1932
Jesse Huta Galung	5–8	3–6	2–2	8	2006
Willem Karsten	1–5	1–3	0–2	4	1934
Edwin Kempes	1–1	1–1	0–0	1	2002
Aad Knappert	0–2	0–1	0–1	1	1931
Josef Knottenbelt	2–2	2–2	0–0	2	1935
Mark Koevermans	8–7	6–3	2–4	8	1988
Ody Koopman	4–4	0–1	4–3	7	1928
Richard Krajicek	7–8	6–8	1–0	9	1991
Ludwig Krijt	2–4	2–4	0–0	3	1951
Gerard Leembruggen	0–2	0–2	0–0	1	1933
John Linck	1–6	1–6	0–0	4	1949
Willem Maris	4–17	3–10	1–7	8	1958
Matwé Middelkoop	0–1	0–1	0–0	1	2009
Tom Nijssen	8–9	6–8	2–1	7	1986
Tom Okker	15–20	10–13	5–7	13	1964
Menno Oosting	7–4	5–3	2–1	4	1985
Ivo Rinkel	7–5	0–2	7–3	10	1946
Jean-Julien Rojer	2–0	0–0	2–0	2	2012
Louk Sanders	16–16	13–12	3–4	14	1975
Sjeng Schalken	21–13	15–12	6–1	17	1996
Michiel Schapers	23–13	14–10	9–3	15	1982
Gerard Scheurleer	2–0	0–0	2–0	2	1934
Evert Schneider	0–3	0–2	0–1	1	1962
Thomas Schoorel	2–1	2–1	0–0	2	2011
Ton Sie	1–0	0–0	1–0	1	1983
Jan Siemerink	17–10	13–8	4–2	16	1991
Igor Sijsling	1–5	0–2	1–3	5	2007
Raemon Sluiter	6–11	6–10	0–1	12	2001
Pieter Soeters	0–2	0–2	0–0	1	1970
Diederik Teschmacher	0–3	0–3	0–0	2	1935
Rolf Thung	6–8	4–6	2–2	7	1974
Hendrik Timmer	43–22	32–15	11–7	26	1923
Huub van Boeckel	12–11	2–6	10–5	15	1980
Johannes Van Dalsum	6–9	3–6	3–3	7	1955
Hans Van De Weg	0–2	0–0	0–2	2	1958
Marinus Van Der Feen	0–2	0–2	0–0	1	1923
Jan Van Der Heide	0–2	0–1	0–1	1	1931
Pieter van Eijsden	6–15	4–11	2–4	10	1958
Melle van Gemerden	0–4	0–3	0–1	2	2005
Christiaan van Lennep	14–12	6–10	8–2	12	1920
John van Lottum	2–4	0–3	2–1	5	1998
Robert van Meegeren	2–8	2–7	0–1	6	1948
Paul van Min	0–1	0–0	0–1	1	1980
Dennis van Scheppingen	1–1	1–0	0–1	2	1996
Hans van Swol	18–21	8–16	10–5	16	1937
Martin Verkerk	6–5	3–4	3–1	5	2002
Rogier Wassen	0–3	0–0	0–3	3	2006
Peter Wessels	4–5	2–2	2–3	6	2005
Eric Wilborts	5–3	5–3	0–0	4	1981
Hubert Wilton	4–5	3–4	1–1	4	1947
