= Chris Bovett =

British-American tennis player (born 1945)

- Full name: Christopher Bovett
- Country (sports): Great Britain
- Born: 25 December 1945 (age 79); West Hagley, England
- Height: 5 ft 11 in (180 cm)
- Plays: Right handed

Singles

Grand Slam singles results
- Australian Open: 1R (1964, 1965, 1966)
- French Open: Q3 (1971)
- Wimbledon: Q3 (1971)
- US Open: 2R (1967)

Doubles

Grand Slam doubles results
- French Open: 2R (1971)
- US Open: 3R (1968)

Coaching awards and records
- Awards Texas Tennis Hall of Fame (2014)

Christopher Bovett (born 25 December 1945) is a British-American former professional tennis player.

Born in Worcestershire, Bovett was educated at Harrow High School. In the mid-1960s, after failing to secure special coaching from the LTA, he emigrated to Australia to work as a freelance photographer. He secured a scholarship in 1966 to Pan American College (Texas), later transferring to the University of Houston, where he met his wife Karen. He featured in main draws at the Australian and US national championships while based in both countries. A longtime resident of the Houston area, he was a 2014 inductee into the Texas Tennis Hall of Fame.
