= 1965 Wimbledon Championships =

- Date: 21 June – 3 July
- Edition: 79th
- Category: Grand Slam
- Surface: Grass
- Location: Church Road; SW19, Wimbledon, London, United Kingdom
- Venue: All England Lawn Tennis and Croquet Club
- Attendance: 275,240

Champions

Men's singles
- (Australia) Roy Emerson

Women's singles
- (Australia) Margaret Smith

Men's doubles
- (Australia) John Newcombe / (Australia) Tony Roche

Women's doubles
- (Brazil) Maria Bueno / (United States) Billie Jean King

Mixed doubles
- (Australia) Ken Fletcher / (Australia) Margaret Smith

Boys' singles
- (Soviet Union) Vladimir Korotkov

Girls' singles
- (Soviet Union) Olga Morozova
- Wimbledon Championships

The 1965 Wimbledon Championships took place on the outdoor grass courts at the All England Lawn Tennis and Croquet Club in Wimbledon, London, United Kingdom. The tournament was held from Monday 21 June until Saturday 3 July 1965. It was the 79th staging of the Wimbledon Championships, and the third Grand Slam tennis event of 1965. Roy Emerson and Margaret Smith won the singles titles.

For the first time since the introduction of seeding, no British player was seeded in either the men's or women's singles events.

== Champions ==
=== Seniors ===
==== Men's singles ====
(Australia) Roy Emerson defeated (Australia) Fred Stolle, 6–2, 6–4, 6–4

==== Women's singles ====
(Australia) Margaret Smith defeated (Brazil) Maria Bueno, 6–4, 7–5

==== Men's doubles ====
(Australia) John Newcombe / (Australia) Tony Roche defeated (Australia) Ken Fletcher / (Australia) Bob Hewitt, 7–5, 6–3, 6–4

==== Women's doubles ====
(Brazil) Maria Bueno / (United States) Billie Jean King defeated (France) Françoise Dürr / (France) Janine Lieffrig, 6–2, 7–5

==== Mixed doubles ====
(Australia) Ken Fletcher / (Australia) Margaret Smith defeated (Australia) Tony Roche / (Australia) Judy Tegart, 12–10, 6–3

=== Juniors ===
==== Boys' singles ====
(Soviet Union) Vladimir Korotkov defeated (France) Georges Goven, 6–2, 3–6, 6–3

==== Girls' singles ====
(Soviet Union) Olga Morozova defeated (Argentina) Raquel Giscafré, 6–3, 6–3

Preceded by 1965 French Championships	Grand Slams	Succeeded by 1965 U.S. National Championships
