= Françoise Dürr =

French tennis player

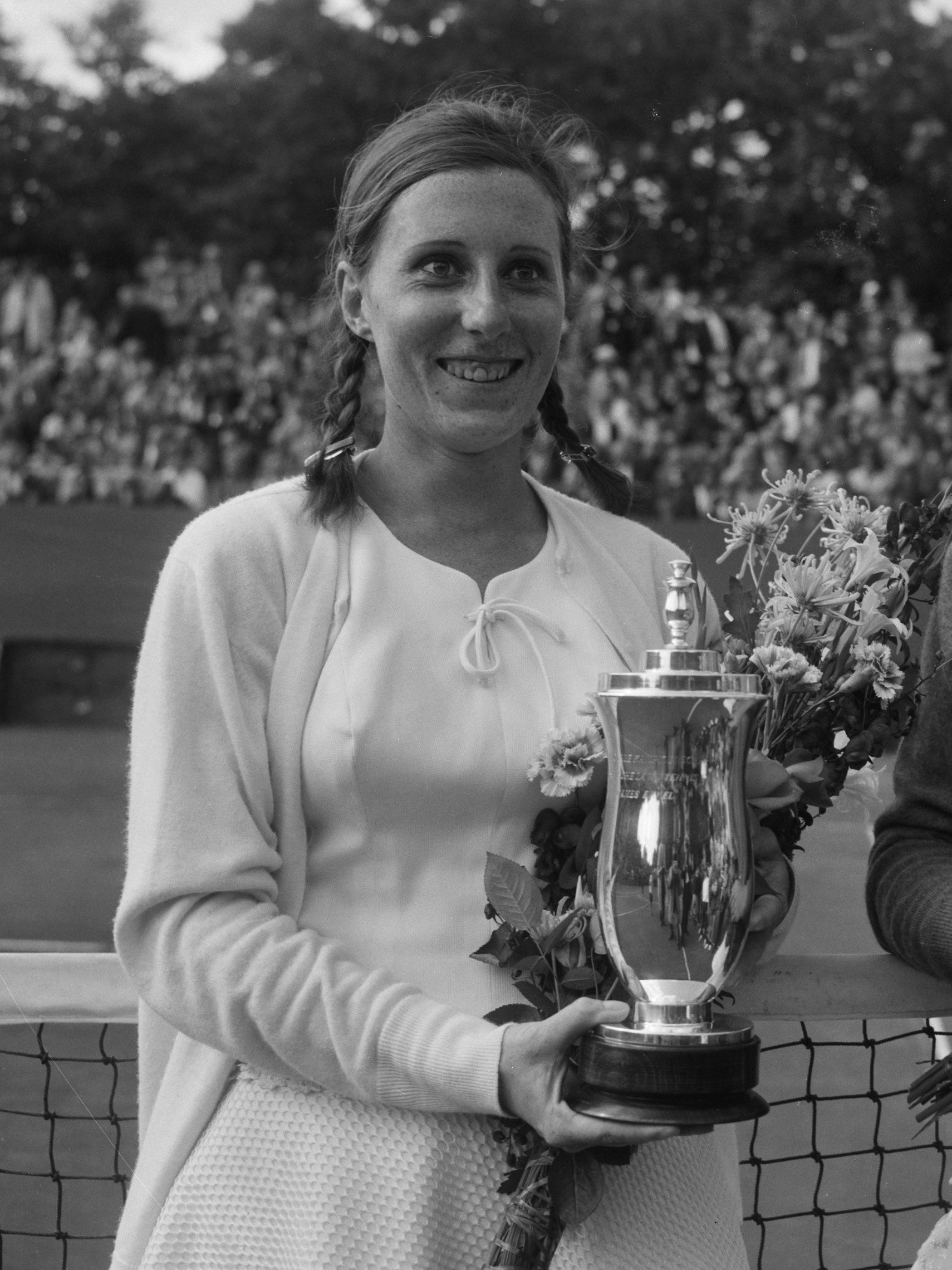
- Hilversum, Netherlands, 1965
- Country (sports): France
- Born: 25 December 1942 (age 83) Algiers, French Algeria
- Height: 1.63 m (5 ft 4 in)
- Turned pro: 1968 (start of Open era)
- Retired: 1984
- Plays: Right-handed (one-handed backhand)
- Int. Tennis HoF: 2003 (member page)

Singles
- Career record: 101–79
- Career titles: 50
- Highest ranking: No. 3 (1967)

Grand Slam singles results
- Australian Open: QF (1965, 1967)
- French Open: W (1967)
- Wimbledon: SF (1970)
- US Open: SF (1967)

Doubles
- Career record: 202–80
- Career titles: 60
- Highest ranking: No. 1 (1969)

Grand Slam doubles results
- Australian Open: SF (1969)
- French Open: W (1967, 1968, 1969, 1970, 1971)
- Wimbledon: F (1965, 1968, 1970, 1972, 1973, 1975)
- US Open: W (1969, 1972)

Other doubles tournaments
- Tour Finals: W (1979)

Mixed doubles
- Career titles: 4

Grand Slam mixed doubles results
- Australian Open: SF (1967)
- French Open: W (1968, 1971, 1973)
- Wimbledon: W (1976)
- US Open: F (1969)

Françoise Dürr (born 25 December 1942; sometimes referred to by English writers as Frankie Durr) is a retired French tennis player. She won 50 singles titles and over 60 doubles titles.

Durr played with an unorthodox backhand, which she played with an Eastern forehand grip and her index finger extended up the handle. She is also noted for having an unorthodox serve that "might not have registered on a radar gun" according to her official Tennis Hall of Fame biography.

According to Lance Tingay, Bud Collins, and the Women's Tennis Association, Dürr was ranked in the world top ten from 1965 through 1967, from 1970 through 1972, and from 1974 through 1976, reaching a career high of world No. 3 in those rankings in 1967. She finished second to Billie Jean King in prize money earnings in 1971.

Dürr reached a total of 27 Grand Slam finals – one in singles, 18 in women's doubles, and eight in mixed doubles. She won twelve of them.

== Personal life ==
Françoise Dürr married Boyd Browning, an American radio executive, in 1975 and later moved to the United States where she stayed for 10 years. Her son Nicholas was born in 1980, her daughter Jessica in 1985. In 1992 she returned to live near Paris.

== Career ==
Dürr is best known for winning the singles title at the 1967 French Championships. She defeated Maria Bueno in a quarterfinal and Lesley Turner in the final. In addition to her singles championship, Dürr won seven Grand Slam women's doubles titles and four Grand Slam mixed doubles titles. She was the runner-up in 11 Grand Slam women's doubles events and four Grand Slam mixed doubles events.

Dürr won eight doubles titles at the French Championships. The first of her record-tying five consecutive women's doubles titles was in 1967. This record is shared with Martina Navratilova and Gigi Fernández, who, like Dürr, achieved it with separate partners. Dürr teamed with Ann Haydon-Jones to win the titles in 1968 and 1969 and with Gail Sherriff Chanfreau in 1967, 1970, and 1971. She was the runner-up in women's doubles in 1965 with Janine Lieffrig, in 1973 with Betty Stöve, and in 1979 with Virginia Wade. Dürr teamed with Jean-Claude Barclay to win the mixed doubles title in 1968, 1971, and 1973. They were runners-up in 1969, 1970, and 1972. In total, Dürr reached 15 finals at the French Open, winning 9 of them.

She won two doubles titles at the US Open. She won the women's doubles title in 1969 with Darlene Hard and in 1972 with Stöve. Dürr was the runner-up in that event in 1971 with Chanfreau and in 1974 with Stöve. Dürr was the runner-up in mixed doubles in 1969, teaming with Dennis Ralston.

She won the Wimbledon mixed doubles title in 1976 with Tony Roche. She was the runner-up in women's doubles at Wimbledon in 1965 with Lieffrig, 1968 with Jones, 1970 with Wade, 1972 with Judy Tegart Dalton, and 1973 and 1975 with Stöve. Additionally, Dürr was a singles semifinalist at the Championships in 1970.

Dürr was rarely a participant at the Australian Championships and Australian Open, as she appeared there three times, in 1965, 1967, and 1969. She reached the singles quarterfinals in 1965 and 1967 and the doubles semifinals with Jones in 1969.

Dürr and Betty Stöve won the 1979 WTA Tour Championships in doubles against Sue Barker and Ann Kiyomura, beating them 7–6, 7–6 in the final. She played the French Open ladies doubles event a last time in 1984, reaching the second round and then retired from Grand Slam competition.

She played for the France Fed Cup team 14 times, finishing her career with a 31–17 record. She played 27 ties, with a 16–8 singles record and a 15–9 doubles record.

Dürr played her last official match in 1984 at the French Open, and was inducted into the International Tennis Hall of Fame in 2003 for her extraordinary career in doubles and for winning the French Championships in singles.

== Grand Slam tournament finals ==
=== Singles: 1 (title) ===
Result	Year	Championship	Surface	Opponent	Score
Win	1967	French Championships	Clay	(Australia) Lesley Turner	4–6, 6–3, 6–4

=== Doubles: 18 (7 titles, 11 runner-ups) ===
Result	Year	Championship	Surface	Partner	Opponents	Score
Loss	1965	French Championships	Clay	(France) Janine Lieffrig	(Australia) Margaret Court (Australia) Lesley Turner	3–6, 1–6
Loss	1965	Wimbledon	Grass	(France) Janine Lieffrig	(Brazil) Maria Bueno (United States) Billie Jean King	2–6, 5–7
Win	1967	French Championships	Clay	(France) Gail Chanfreau	(South Africa) Annette Van Zyl (South Africa) Pat Walkden	6–2, 6–2
Loss	1968	Wimbledon	Grass	(United Kingdom) Ann Haydon-Jones	(United States) Rosemary Casals (United States) Billie Jean King	6–3, 4–6, 5–7
Win	1968	French Open	Clay	(United Kingdom) Ann Haydon-Jones	(United States) Rosemary Casals (United States) Billie Jean King	7–5, 4–6, 6–4
Win	1969	French Open	Clay	(United Kingdom) Ann Haydon-Jones	(United States) Nancy Richey (Australia) Margaret Court	6–0, 4–6, 7–5
Win	1969	US Open	Grass	(United States) Darlene Hard	(Australia) Margaret Court (United Kingdom) Virginia Wade	0–6, 6–3, 6–4
Win	1970	French Open	Clay	(France) Gail Chanfreau	(United States) Rosemary Casals (United States) Billie Jean King	6–1, 3–6, 6–3
Loss	1970	Wimbledon	Grass	(United Kingdom) Virginia Wade	(United States) Rosemary Casals (United States) Billie Jean King	2–6, 3–6
Win	1971	French Open	Clay	(France) Gail Chanfreau	(Australia) Helen Gourlay (Australia) Kerry Harris	6–4, 6–1
Loss	1971	US Open	Grass	(France) Gail Chanfreau	(United States) Rosemary Casals (Australia) Judy Tegart	3–6, 3–6
Loss	1972	Wimbledon	Grass	(Australia) Judy Tegart	(United States) Billie Jean King (Netherlands) Betty Stöve	2–6, 6–4, 3–6
Win	1972	US Open	Grass	(Netherlands) Betty Stöve	(Australia) Margaret Court (United Kingdom) Virginia Wade	6–3, 1–6, 6–3
Loss	1973	French Open	Clay	(Netherlands) Betty Stöve	(Australia) Margaret Court (United Kingdom) Virginia Wade	2–6, 3–6
Loss	1973	Wimbledon	Grass	(Netherlands) Betty Stöve	(United States) Rosemary Casals (United States) Billie Jean King	1–6, 6–4, 5–7
Loss	1974	US Open	Grass	(Netherlands) Betty Stöve	(United States) Rosemary Casals (United States) Billie Jean King	6–7, 7–6, 4–6
Loss	1975	Wimbledon	Grass	(Netherlands) Betty Stöve	(United States) Ann Kiyomura (Japan) Kazuko Sawamatsu	5–7, 6–1, 5–7
Loss	1979	French Open	Clay	(United Kingdom) Virginia Wade	(Netherlands) Betty Stöve (Australia) Wendy Turnbull	6–2, 5–7, 4–6

=== Mixed doubles: 8 (4 titles, 4 runner-ups) ===
Result	Year	Championship	Surface	Partner	Opponents	Score
Win	1968	French Open	Clay	(France) Jean-Claude Barclay	(United States) Billie Jean King (Australia) Owen Davidson	6–1, 6–4
Loss	1969	French Open	Clay	(France) Jean-Claude Barclay	(Australia) Margaret Court (United States) Marty Riessen	3–6, 2–6
Loss	1969	US Open	Grass	(United States) Dennis Ralston	(Australia) Margaret Court (United States) Marty Riessen	4–6, 5–7
Loss	1970	French Open	Clay	(France) Jean-Claude Barclay	(United States) Billie Jean King (South Africa) Bob Hewitt	6–3, 4–6, 2–6
Win	1971	French Open	Clay	(France) Jean-Claude Barclay	(United Kingdom) Winnie Shaw (Soviet Union) Toomas Leius	6–2, 6–4
Loss	1972	French Open	Clay	(France) Jean-Claude Barclay	(Australia) Evonne Goolagong (Australia) Kim Warwick	2–6, 4–6
Win	1973	French Open	Clay	(France) Jean-Claude Barclay	(Netherlands) Betty Stöve (France) Patrice Dominguez	6–1, 6–4
Win	1976	Wimbledon	Grass	(Australia) Tony Roche	(United States) Rosemary Casals (United States) Dick Stockton	6–3, 2–6, 7–5

== Other tournaments and team competitions ==
=== 1959–1970 ===
- Junior Singles Champion of France, 1959 and 1960.
- French Singles Champion in the National (closed) Championship, 1962, 1964, 1965 and 1966.
- French National Champion in ladies doubles eight times between 1961 and 1970, with various partners.
- French National Champion five times in mixed doubles between 1964 and 1970, mainly partnered by Jean-Claude Barclay.
- Winner of the Wimbledon Ladies Plate in 1963.
- South African (East London) singles champion, 1965; other singles titles in 1965 were the Dutch Open, the Turkish in Istanbul, Saint-Moritz, Swiss Open, Caracas, Colombia and Monte Carlo.
- Dürr defeated Judy Tegart in the final to win the 1966 British Grass Court Championship at Queens Club London; other singles titles in 1966 were the Dutch Open (defended), Swiss Open (defended) and Perth, Western Australia.
- German Open singles champion, 1967; other singles titles in 1967 were the Pacific Southwest, Kitzbuehel, Canberra, New Zealand Open, Kingston and Båstad.
- Swiss Open singles champion, 1969.
- Italian Open doubles champion with Ann Jones, 1969.
- Losing finalist with Ann Jones in the 1969 Pacific Southwest Doubles Championship to King and Casals, 6–8, 8–6, 11–9.
- Italian Open doubles losing finalist with Virginia Wade 1970, winners King and Casals, 6–2, 3–6, 9–7.
- Losing finalist in the Swiss Open in Gstaad in 1970, 6–2, 5–7, 6–2 to Rosemary Casals.
- Doubles champion with Rosemary Casals in Gstaad 1970, defeated Helga Niessen and Betty Stöve, 6–2, 6–2.
- British Indoor singles champion at the Albert Hall, London, 1970.

=== 1971–1979 ===
- Winner in singles against Wimbledon and French Open champion Evonne Goolagong at the Canada Masters, 1971.
- Dürr and Casals defeated Goolagong and Bowrey 6–3, 6–3 to win the Canadian Open Doubles Championships of 1971.
- Winner against Billie Jean King in the 1971 U.S. Clay Court International Tennis Championships at Fort Lauderdale, Florida.
- Winner against Lesley Hunt in the 1971 Swiss Open in Gstaad (the last of her four Swiss Open wins).
- Winner against Billie Jean King in the 1971 Benson and Hedges New Zealand International Grass Court Championships in Christchurch.
- Winner against Billie Jean King in the 1971 Clay Court International Championship at Lake Bluff, Chicago, Illinois.
- Losing finalist to Billie Jean King in the 1971 Embassy British Indoor Championship at Wembley, London.
- Losing finalist to Rosemary Casals in the 1971 Philadelphia Indoor Singles Championship.
- Losing finalist to Virginia Wade in the 1972 USA Indoor Championship in Boston, Massachusetts.
- Losing finalist to Rosemary Casals in the 1972 Longbeach CA Singles Championship.
- Losing finalist to Rosemary Casals in the 1972 Virginia Slims Columbus Ohio Singles Championship.
- Winner against Rosemary Casals in the 1973 Virginia Slims Championship, Houston.
- Member of 1974 World Team Tennis champion Denver Racquets.
- Losing finalist in the 1975 Swedish Open in Stockholm to Virginia Wade.
- Dürr and Stöve defeated Wade and Goolagong to win the 1975 Swedish Open Doubles Championship.
- Dürr and Casals defeated Evert and Navratilova to win the 1976 Virginia Slims of Houston Doubles Championship.
- Dürr and Casals defeated Wade and Stöve to win the 1976 U.S. Indoor Doubles Championships held in Atlanta.
- Losing finalist against Chris Evert at Palm Springs in the Colgate Inaugural Singles Championships 1976. In the semifinal she had beaten Martina Navratilova (who was then ranked number 2 in the world) 6–1, 6–1; four months earlier at Wimbledon Dürr had lost to Navratilova in the fourth round of the singles having held match points.
- Dürr and Wade won the 1977 Colgate Series Championship Doubles at Palm Springs defeating Helen Gourlay-Cawley and Joanne Russell in the final.
- Dürr and Wade were runners up in the 1977 Family Circle Hiltonhead Doubles won by Casals and Evert.
- Dürr and Navratilova were runners up in the 1977 Virginia Slims of Seattle Doubles, won by Casals and Evert.
- Losing finalist with Virginia Wade in the 1978 Virginia Slims of Hollywood Doubles, won by Casals and Turnbull.
- Dürr lost in the final of the 1978 World Tennis Classic in Montreal to Caroline Stoll.
- Dürr and Stöve won the 1979 Avon Masters in New York defeating Barker and Kiyomura.
- Dürr and Stöve won the 1979 Bridgestone World Doubles Championship defeating Barker and Kiyomura.

Dürr won over 60 major doubles titles in her career with various partners and featured in many more finals and semifinals. She featured in many major singles finals and semifinals in a career spanning over 20 years. She was French No. 1 for almost all that time. Dürr was an integral member of France's Fed Cup team in 1963–1967, 1970, 1972, and 1977–1979. Her career win–loss record was 16–8 in singles and 15–9 in doubles.

Dürr, Ann Jones, Billie Jean King and Rosemary Casals were the first women to sign professional contracts and organise their own tours at the start of the open era in 1968. In 1970, Dürr had a commitment to play her French Tennis Nationals and went back to France, which prevented her from signing up with Gladys Heldman's Original 9 like Stöve too. Dürr was a founding member of the Women's Tennis Association in 1973 and became the WTA's secretary with Billie Jean King elected as president. Dürr was the first woman to play 100 events on the Virginia Slims Tour (1978). Dürr played consistently on the World Team Tennis circuit from 1974 to 1978. Dürr was the first female player to travel the tennis circuit with her dog named Topspin. The dog also became a star because she carried Dürr's racquet onto the tennis court and was the mascot for the World Team Tennis Denver Racquets.

== Career and awards after retiring from the tour ==
In 1993, Dürr was appointed the first Technical Director of Women's Tennis for the French Tennis Federation (FFT). She was the captain of the French Fed Cup team from 1993 through 1996 and the co-captain of the team with Yannick Noah in 1997 when they won the first Fed Cup for France. She retired from the FFT in February 2002.

She received the WTA Tour's Honorary Membership Award in 1988 for her contributions to the founding, development, and direction of women's professional tennis. In 2003, Dürr was inducted into the International Tennis Hall of Fame. She received the Fed Cup Award of Excellence in 2005, presented jointly by the International Tennis Federation and the International Tennis Hall of Fame. In April 2010 a French national honour was presented to Françoise Dürr in recognition of her contribution to sport and the advancement of women in sport. She received the Medal and title of Officer of the National Order of Merit (Officier de l'Ordre national du Mérite, France). In 2024 Francoise Dürr was the awarded the highest civilian honour that can be bestowed that of Legion of Honour which was presented to her by President Macron .

== Grand Slam performance timelines ==
Key
W	F	SF	QF	#R	RR	Q#	DNQ	A	NH

(W) winner; (F) finalist; (SF) semifinalist; (QF) quarterfinalist; (#R) rounds 4, 3, 2, 1; (RR) round-robin stage; (Q#) qualification round; (DNQ) did not qualify; (A) absent; (NH) not held; (SR) strike rate (events won / competed); (W–L) win–loss record.

=== Singles ===
Tournament	1960	1961	1962	1963	1964	1965	1966	1967	1968	1969	1970	1971	1972	1973	1974	1975	1976	1977		1978	1979	W–L
Australia	A	A	A	A	A	QF	A	QF	A	2R	A	A	A	A	A	A	A	A	A	A	A	6–3
France	3R	3R	4R	4R	2R	QF	QF	W	4R	3R	3R	QF	SF	SF	A	A	A	A		A	1R	40–15
Wimbledon	A	A	A	2R	2R	4R	QF	3R	QF	2R	SF	QF	QF	4R	3R	2R	4R	3R		3R	2R	35–17
U.S. Championships	A	A	3R	A	3R	QF	QF	SF	3R	3R	QF	3R	3R	1R	2R	2R	4R	1R		A	1R	28–16

Note: The Australian Open was held twice in 1977, in January and December.

=== Doubles ===
Tournament	1960	1961	1962	1963	1964	1965	1966	1967	1968	1969	1970	1971	1972	1973	1974	1975	1976	1977		1978	1979	1980	1981	1982	1983	1984	W–L
Australia	A	A	A	A	A	QF	A	QF	A	SF	A	A	A	A	A	A	A	A	A	A	A	A	A	A	A	A	5–3
France	2R	2R	QF	QF	1R	F	QF	W	W	W	W	W	SF	F	A	A	A	A		A	F	1R	2R	A	A	2R	43–12
Wimbledon	A	A	A	1R	2R	F	1R	QF	F	3R	F	SF	F	F	QF	F	QF	SF		SF	SF	A	A	A	A	A	51–17
U.S. Championships	A	A	A	A	A	A	SF	A	SF	W	SF	F	W	QF	F	SF	QF	QF		SF	1R	A	A	A	A	A	39–11

Note: The Australian Open was held twice in 1977, in January and December.

=== Mixed doubles ===
Tournament	1960	1961	1962	1963	1964	1965	1966	1967	1968	1969	1970	1971	1972	1973	1974	1975	1976	1977	1978	1979	1980	W–L
Australia	A	A	A	A	A	QF	A	SF	A	1R	NH	NH	NH	NH	NH	NH	NH	NH	NH	NH	NH	4–3
France	3R	1R	2R	1R	A	SF	QF	2R	W	F	F	W	F	W	A	A	A	A	A	QF	QF	40–10
Wimbledon	A	A	A	1R	4R	QF	SF	3R	2R	1R	2R	2R	3R	4R	SF	3R	W	3R	SF	2R	A	29–16
U.S. Championships	A	A	A	A	A	QF	2R	A	A	F	SF	2R	3R	QF	A	2R	QF	1R	QF	QF	A	20–10

Note: no mixed-doubles tournament was held at the Australian Open from 1970 to 1986

== See also ==
- Performance timelines for all female tennis players since 1978 who reached at least one Grand Slam final
