= Ton Sie =

Indonesian-born Dutch tennis player

- Country (sports): Netherlands
- Born: 8 September 1955 (age 69); Indonesia

Doubles
- Career record: 1-0 (Davis Cup)

Ton Sie (born 8 September 1955) is an Indonesian-born Dutch former professional tennis player.

Sie was born in Indonesia soon after independence and grew up in a large family, with five older brothers. He moved to the Netherlands at the age of 13 and won a junior national championship there four years later. In the late 1970s he played collegiate tennis in the United States for Santa Monica College and Arizona State University. He won the national doubles championship with Martin Koek in 1983 and made a Davis Cup appearance that year against Portugal in Estoril, where he and Michiel Schapers were victorious in a live doubles rubber to give Netherlands the tie.

== See also ==
- List of Netherlands Davis Cup team representatives
