= Becky Vest =

American tennis player

- Full name: Rebecca Louise Vest
- Country (sports): United States
- Born: April 3, 1948 (age 76)

Singles

Grand Slam singles results
- French Open: 2R (1971)
- Wimbledon: 2R (1971)
- US Open: 2R (1967)

Doubles

Grand Slam doubles results
- French Open: 2R (1971)
- US Open: 2R (1965)

Grand Slam mixed doubles results
- French Open: 2R (1971)

Rebecca Louise Vest (born April 3, 1948) is an American former professional tennis player.

Vest, a native of Jackson, Mississippi, is the daughter of tennis player Dorothy Vest and played collegiate tennis for Trinity University in Texas. She won back to back intercollegiate doubles championships with Emily Burrer 1968 and 1969. On the international tour, she had appearances at the French Open and Wimbledon.
