= Paul van Min =

Dutch tennis player

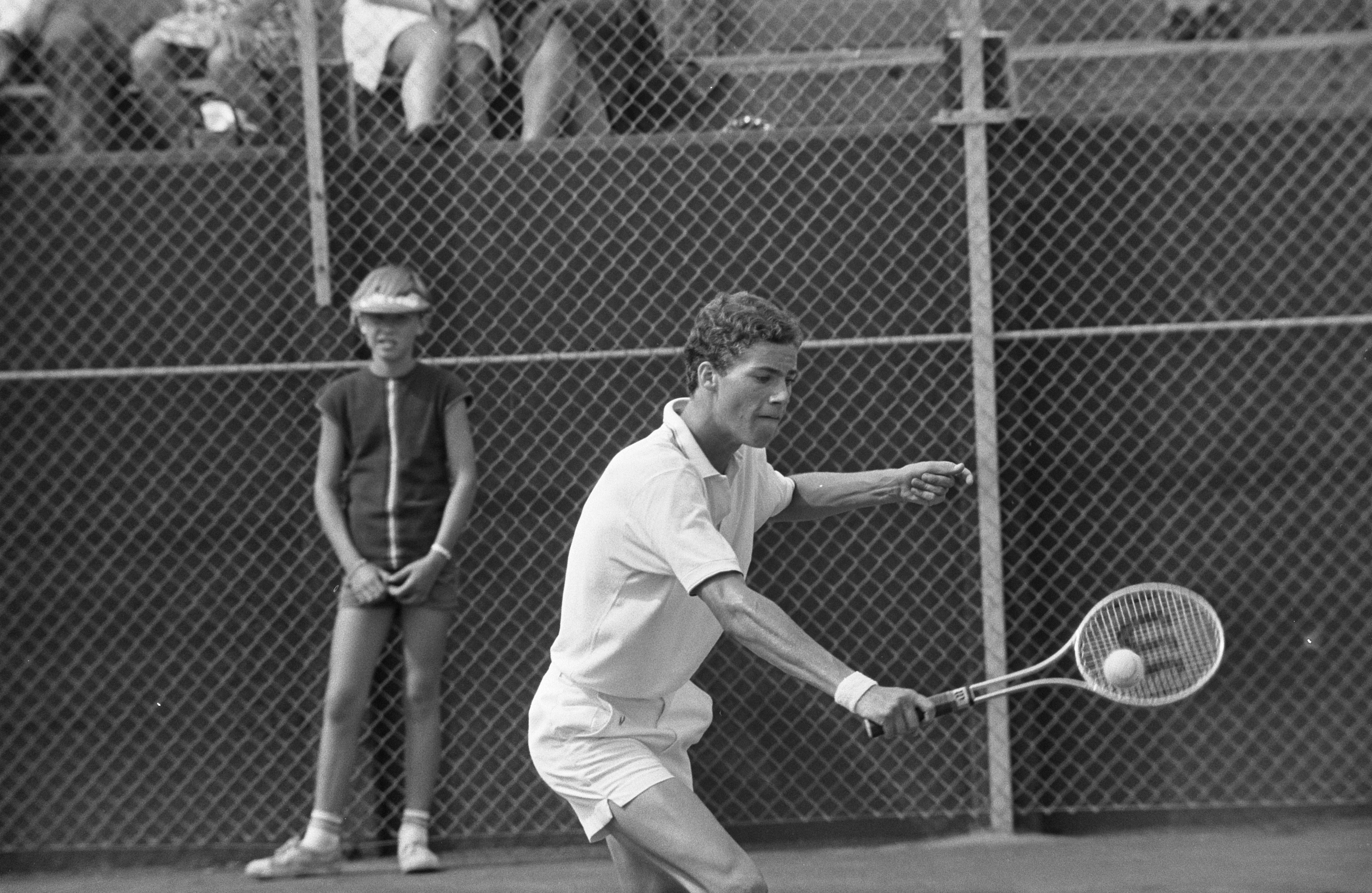
- Country (sports): Netherlands
- Born: 17 September 1951 (age 73)
- Plays: Right-handed

Singles
- Career record: 1–8
- Highest ranking: No. 263 (31 December 1978)

Grand Slam singles results
- French Open: 1R (1971)

Paul van Min (born 17 September 1951) is a Dutch former professional tennis player.

== Biography ==
A right-handed player, van Min featured in the main draw of the 1971 French Open as a lucky loser from qualifying. He lost his first round match in four sets to Peter Pokorny.

From 1972 to 1975 he played college tennis for the University of Tennessee, but returned to compete on the professional tour.

Van Min made his only Davis Cup appearance in 1980, when he partnered with Theo Gorter in the doubles rubber for a tie against Denmark in Hilversum.

Until 2019 he and his wife owned and operated Silky Oaks Lodge in Far North Queensland, having acquired the resort in 2009.

== See also ==
- List of Netherlands Davis Cup team representatives
