= Bernard Montrenaud =

French tennis player (born 1944)

- Country (sports): France
- Born: 28 March 1944 (age 81)

Singles
- Career record: 6–18

Grand Slam singles results
- French Open: 2R (1967, 1968, 1970, 1971)
- Wimbledon: 1R (1966, 1967, 1970)

Doubles
- Career record: 8–13

Grand Slam doubles results
- French Open: 3R (1970, 1973)
- Wimbledon: 1R (1966, 1967, 1970)

Grand Slam mixed doubles results
- French Open: QF (1971)
- Wimbledon: 2R (1967)

Bernard Montrenaud (born 28 March 1944) is a French former professional tennis player.

Montrenaud was a finalist at the 1969 French national championships, losing to François Jauffret.

During his career he featured in the singles second round at Roland Garros on four occasions and was a mixed doubles quarter-finalist with Janine Lieffrig in 1971. He also appeared in several editions of the Wimbledon Championships.
