= Géza Varga (tennis) =

Hungarian tennis player

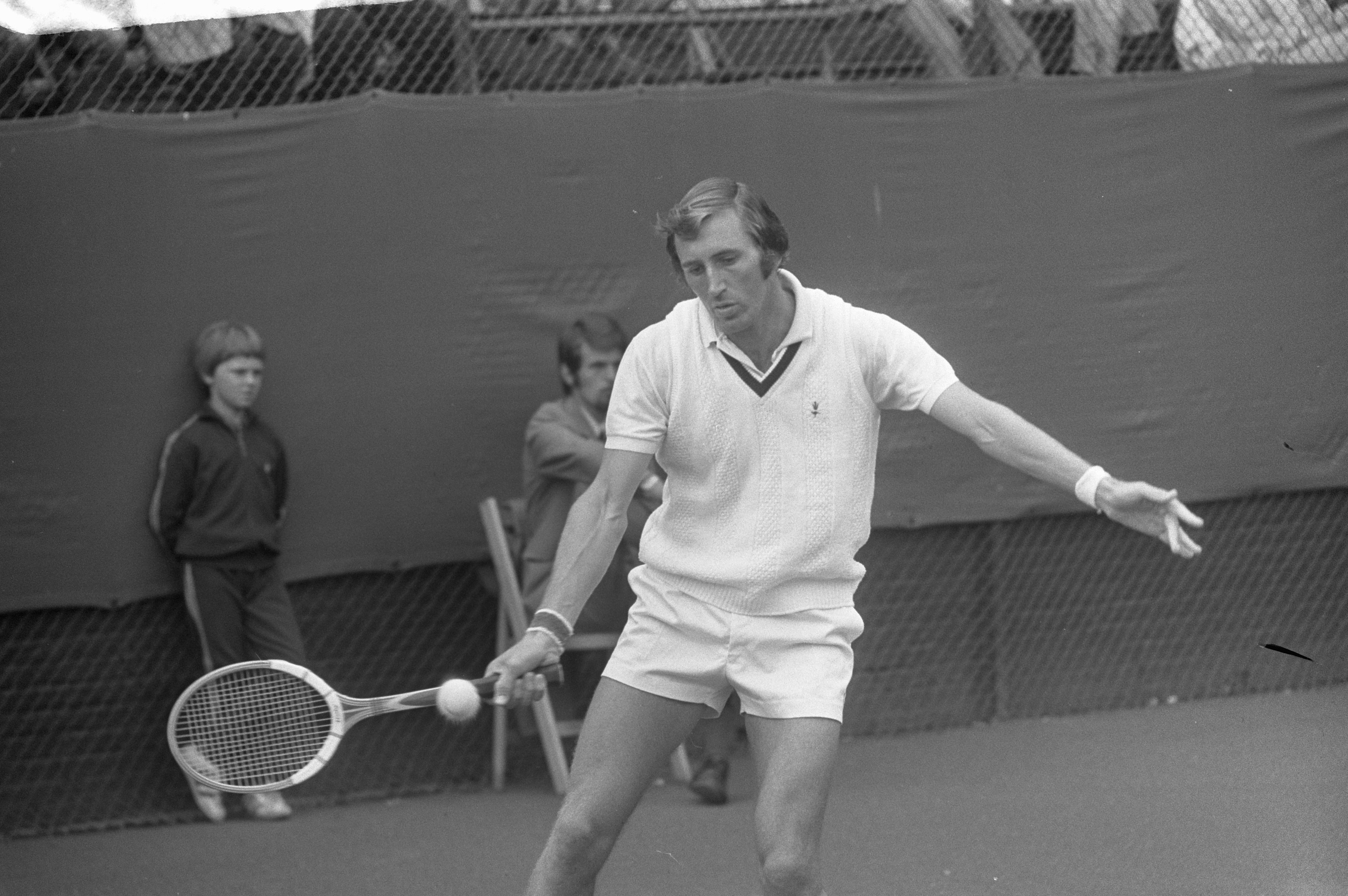
- Country (sports): Hungary
- Born: 15 November 1944 (age 81)
- Plays: Right-handed

Singles
- Career record: 11–18
- Highest ranking: No. 228 (20 December 1974)

Grand Slam singles results
- French Open: 1R (1970, 1971, 1973)

Doubles
- Career record: 0–9

Grand Slam doubles results
- Australian Open: 1R (1973)
- French Open: 2R (1970, 1971)

Géza Varga (born 15 November 1944) is a Hungarian former professional tennis player. He was the Hungarian national champion in 1982.

A right-handed player, Varga competed on the professional tour from the late 1960s through the 1970s.

Varga featured in the singles main draw of the French Open on three occasions, including in 1971 when he won a set against second seed Arthur Ashe.

His best performance on the Grand Prix circuit was a semi-final appearance at the 1972 Dutch Open.
