= Vincenzo Franchitti =

Italian tennis player

- Country (sports): Italy
- Born: 22 May 1950 (age 74)

Singles
- Career record: 13–30
- Highest ranking: No. 138 (3 June 1974)

Grand Slam singles results
- French Open: 1R (1971, 1974)

Doubles
- Career record: 6–21

Grand Slam doubles results
- French Open: 2R (1971)

Vincenzo Franchitti (born 22 May 1950) is an Italian former professional tennis player.

Franchitti competed on the international tour in the 1970s and was a two-time Florence quarter-finalist.

His best career win came against Björn Borg at the Bologna Indoor in 1974, which made him one of only two Italians to defeat the Swede during his career, along with Adriano Panatta.
