= Wendy Gilchrist =

Australian tennis player

- Full name: Wendy Gilchrist (Paish)
- Country (sports): Australia
- Born: 17 May 1950 (age 74)
- Plays: Left-handed

Singles

Grand Slam singles results
- Australian Open: 3R (1970)
- French Open: 2R (1971, 1974, 1975)
- Wimbledon: 3R (1969, 1974)
- US Open: 3R (1971)

Doubles

Grand Slam doubles results
- Australian Open: SF (1970)
- French Open: 2R (1971, 1972, 1973)
- Wimbledon: QF (1972)
- US Open: 2R (1971, 1972)

Wendy Gilchrist (born 17 May 1950) is a former professional tennis player from Australia. From 1972 she competed as Wendy Paish following her marriage to British Davis Cup player John Paish.

== Biography ==
Born in 1950, she is the daughter of tennis player Jim Gilchrist.

Gilchrist, a left-handed player, played on the professional tour in the 1970s and made it to the Virginia Slims Championships in 1972.

Her best performance in a Grand Slam tournament came at the 1970 Australian Open, where she was a semifinalist in the women's doubles with Lesley Hunt. She was a quarterfinalist in mixed doubles at the 1971 French Open and a quarterfinalist in the women's doubles at the 1972 Wimbledon Championships.
