= 1971 French Open – Men's singles =

Men's singles
- 1971 French Open

Final
- Champion: (Czechoslovakia) Jan Kodeš
- Runner-up: (Romania) Ilie Năstase
- Score: 8–6, 6–2, 2–6, 7–5

Details
- Draw: 128
- Seeds: 16

Events
Singles	men	women		boys	girls
Doubles	men	women	mixed	boys	girls
WC Singles	men	women	quad
WC Doubles	men	women	quad
Legends	−45	45+	women
← 1970 ·	French Open	· 1972 →

Defending champion Jan Kodeš defeated Ilie Năstase in the final, 8–6, 6–2, 2–6, 7–5 to win the men's singles tennis title at the 1971 French Open. It was his second major singles title.

== Seeds ==
The seeded players are listed below. Jan Kodeš is the champion; others show the round in which they were eliminated.

1. (Czechoslovakia) Jan Kodeš (champion)
2. (United States) Arthur Ashe (quarterfinals)
3. (Romania) Ilie Năstase (final)
4. (United States) Cliff Richey (fourth round)
5. (Socialist Federal Republic of Yugoslavia) Željko Franulović (semifinals)
6. (United States) Stan Smith (quarterfinals)
7. (United States) Marty Riessen (fourth round)
8. (Soviet Union) Alex Metreveli (second round)
9. (United States) Robert Lutz (fourth round)
10. (United Kingdom) Roger Taylor (first round)
11. (Spain) Manuel Orantes (first round)
12. (France) Pierre Barthès (fourth round)
13. (Romania) Ion Țiriac (first round)
14. (Socialist Federal Republic of Yugoslavia) Nikola Pilić (first round)
15. (France) Georges Goven (fourth round)
16. (Chile) Jaime Fillol Sr. (first round)

== Draw ==
=== Key ===
- Q = Qualifier
- WC = Wild card
- LL = Lucky loser
- r = Retired

=== Finals ===
Quarterfinals
2	(United States) Arthur Ashe	4	6	3	6	6
(United States) Frank Froehling	6	4	6	3	8
3	(Romania) Ilie Năstase	6	6	3	6
6	(United States) Stan Smith	1	3	6	4
5	(Socialist Federal Republic of Yugoslavia) Željko Franulović	6	6	4	6
(Hungary) István Gulyás	3	2	6	2
(France) Patrick Proisy	4	6	6	1
1	(Czechoslovakia) Jan Kodeš	6	8	1	6

Semifinals
(United States) Frank Froehling	0	6	4	3
3	(Romania) Ilie Năstase	6	2	6	6
5	(Socialist Federal Republic of Yugoslavia) Željko Franulović	4	2	5
1	(Czechoslovakia) Jan Kodeš	6	6	7

Final
3	(Romania) Ilie Năstase	6	2	6	5
1	(Czechoslovakia) Jan Kodeš	8	6	2	7

=== Top half ===
==== Section 1 ====
First round
2	(United States) A Ashe	6	6	5	6
(Hungary) G Varga	2	1	7	1
Q	(Hungary) R Machán	4	6	6	4	6
(Soviet Union) V Egorov	6	1	3	6	8
(Belgium) P Hombergen	6	6	6
(South Africa) B Bertram	2	2	3
(France) J-L Rouyer	6	2	6	7	6
Q	(Czechoslovakia) S Koudelka	1	6	1	9	4
15	(France) G Goven	6	6	6
Q	(Australia) S Ball	1	1	1
(France) D Contet	3	6	2	6	6
(Australia) I Fletcher	6	3	6	4	4
(Austria) P Pokorny	6	6	1	6
(Netherlands) P van Min	3	3	6	1
(United States) C Pasarell	0	6	2
(Italy) N Pietrangeli	6	8	6

Second round
2	(United States) A Ashe	3	6	6	7
(Soviet Union) V Egorov	6	4	0	5
(Belgium) P Hombergen	2	4	5
(France) J-L Rouyer	6	6	7
15	(France) G Goven	5	6	6	7
(France) D Contet	7	3	2	5
(Austria) P Pokorny	4	6	2	3
(Italy) N Pietrangeli	6	2	6	6

Third round
2	(United States) A Ashe	6	6	7
(France) J-L Rouyer	2	3	5
15	(France) G Goven	6	6	3	6
(Italy) N Pietrangeli	4	4	6	1

Fourth round
2	(United States) A Ashe	6	6	7
15	(France) G Goven	4	4	5

==== Section 2 ====
First round
7	(United States) M Riessen	7	6	6
(Italy) S Palmieri	5	1	1
(South Africa) R Moore	5	3	6
(Australia) J Alexander	7	6	8
(France) B Montrenaud	9	6	4	3	7
(Soviet Union) P Lamp	7	0	6	6	5
(Switzerland) D Sturdza	0	1	2
(France) J-C Barclay	6	6	6
10	(United Kingdom) R Taylor	8	2	3	7
(Australia) J Cooper	6	6	6	5^{r}
Q	(West Germany) R Kuhlmey	4	3	3
(United States) F Froehling	6	6	6
(Denmark) J Leschly	7	2	6	6
(Italy) F Bartoni	5	6	4	3
(Poland) M Rybarczyk	w/o
(Spain) J L Arilla

Second round
7	(United States) M Riessen	0	6	5	6	6
(Australia) J Alexander	6	4	7	4	3
(France) R Montrenaud	1	7	0
(France) J-C Barclay	6	9	6
(Australia) J Cooper	2	2	3
(United States) F Froehling	6	6	6
(Denmark) J Leschly	3
(Spain) J L Arilla	2^{r}

Third round
7	(United States) M Riessen	3	6	6	13
(France) J-C Barclay	6	1	3	11
(United States) F Froehling	4	6	8	7
(Denmark) J Leschly	6	3	6	5

Fourth round
7	(United States) M Riessen	6	6	3	4	2
(United States) F Froehling	1	2	6	6	6

==== Section 3 ====
First round
3	(Romania) I Năstase	6	6	6
(Brazil) T Koch	2	2	4
Q	(Soviet Union) H Sepp	1	6	7	0	0
(Hungary) S Baranyi	6	4	5	6	6
(Brazil) J Mandarino	4	8	5
(Australia) R Case	6	10	7
(Australia) R Ruffels	6	6	6
(Chile) P Rodríguez	0	4	2
14	(Socialist Federal Republic of Yugoslavia) N Pilić	w/o
(South Africa) F McMillan
(New Zealand) B Fairlie	10	6	6
(United Kingdom) J Paish	8	0	3
(Soviet Union) V Korotkov	1	6	6	6
(Australia) A Stone	6	1	3	3
(Poland) T Nowicki	6	6	6
(United States) J McManus	3	0	2

Second round
3	(Romania) I Năstase	6	6	3	6
(Hungary) S Baranyi	1	3	6	1
(Australia) R Case	1	1	0
(Australia) R Ruffels	6	6	6
(South Africa) F McMillan	6	6	6
(New Zealand) B Fairlie	2	2	2
(Soviet Union) V Korotkov	3	4	3
(Poland) T Nowicki	6	6	6

Third round
3	(Romania) I Năstase	4	6	6	6
(Australia) R Ruffels	6	2	2	2
(South Africa) F McMillan	6	1	6	2
(Poland) T Nowicki	3	6	8	6

Fourth round
3	(Romania) I Năstase	6	6	3	7
(Poland) T Nowicki	1	1	6	5

==== Section 4 ====
First round
6	(United States) S Smith	6	6	8
(Greece) N Kalogeropoulos	3	2	6
(Spain) J Guerrero	6	6	6
(South Africa) B Freer	0	3	2
(United Kingdom) G Stilwell	6	3	6	6
Q	(Italy) C Barazzutti	4	6	3	0
Q	(France) B Paul	6	6	5	6	3
(Japan) T Sakai	3	2	7	8	6
11	(Spain) M Orantes	w/o
Q	(Soviet Union) T Kakoulia
(Australia) F Sedgman	3	1	4
(France) P Dominguez	6	6	6
(Italy) A Panatta	6	6	7
(United Kingdom) S Matthews	3	3	5
Q	(France) W N'Godrella	6	4	6	7
(Austria) H Kary	3	6	4	5

Second round
6	(United States) S Smith	6	6	6
(Spain) J Guerrero	4	1	1
(United Kingdom) G Stilwell	7	12	6
(Japan) T Sakai	5	10	4
Q	(Soviet Union) T Kakoulia	6	4	2	7
(France) P Dominguez	1	6	6	9
(Italy) A Panatta	6	6	6
Q	(France) W N'Godrella	2	4	1

Third round
6	(United States) S Smith	6	6	6
(United Kingdom) G Stilwell	1	1	3
(France) P Dominguez	6	8	3	4	9
(Italy) A Panatta	4	6	6	6	7

Fourth round
6	(United States) S Smith	6	2	8	6
(France) P Dominguez	4	6	6	2

=== Bottom half ===
==== Section 5 ====
First round
(South Africa) T Ryan	6	2	6	6
(Belgium) E Drossart	2	6	4	2
Q	(Ecuador) E Zuleta
(Ecuador) P Guzmán	w/o
(India) J Mukherjea	w/o
(Australia) D Crealy
(Czechoslovakia) V Zednik	4	6	3	1
12	(France) P Barthès	6	3	6	6
(France) J-P Meyer	4	8	6	2
(Socialist Federal Republic of Yugoslavia) B Jovanović	6	6	2	0^{r}
(United States) T Gorman	2	2	8	6	6
(Rhodesia) A Pattison	6	6	6	3	4
(United Kingdom) J Clifton	4	4	4
(Spain) A Muñoz	6	6	6
(South Africa) P Cramer	2	2	6	8
5	(Socialist Federal Republic of Yugoslavia) Z Franulović	6	6	2	10

Second round
(South Africa) T Ryan	7	6	6
Q	(Ecuador) E Zuleta	5	3	3
(Australia) D Crealy	2	1	4
12	(France) P Barthès	6	6	6
(France) J-P Meyer	12	2	2	1
(United States) T Gorman	10	6	6	6
(Spain) A Muñoz	2	3	3
5	(Socialist Federal Republic of Yugoslavia) Z Franulović	6	6	6

Third round
(South Africa) T Ryan	7	1	2
12	(France) P Barthès	9	6	6
(United States) T Gorman	3	1	5
5	(Socialist Federal Republic of Yugoslavia) Z Franulović	6	6	7

Fourth round
12	(France) P Barthès	4	6	6	2	4
5	(Socialist Federal Republic of Yugoslavia) Z Franulović	6	4	4	6	6

==== Section 6 ====
First round
(Hungary) I Gulyás	4	7	11	6
(Spain) J Gisbert Sr	6	5	9	2
(Socialist Federal Republic of Yugoslavia) N Špear	6	7	6
Q	(Italy) V Franchitti	2	5	3
(Australia) B Phillips-Moore	6	6	3	3	6
(Chile) P Cornejo	1	4	6	6	1
(Australia) W Bowrey	6	6	8
13	(Romania) I Țiriac	3	2	6
Q	(France) P Joly	1	4	1
(Australia) C Dibley	6	6	6
(France) M Leclercq	6	7	6
Q	(Colombia) W Álvarez	4	5	4
(Australia) T Addison	6	4	6	7
(Hungary) P Szőke	1	6	0	5
(Italy) M Di Domenico	2	4	2
4	(United States) C Richey	6	6	6

Second round
(Hungary) I Gulyás	6	6	6
(Socialist Federal Republic of Yugoslavia) N Špear	0	3	0
(Australia) B Phillips-Moore	1	3	6	6	6
(Australia) W Bowrey	6	6	3	1	8
(Australia) C Dibley	6	6	7
(France) M Leclercq	1	3	5
(Australia) T Addison	1	2	0
4	(United States) C Richey	6	6	6

Third round
(Hungary) I Gulyás	6	6	6
(Australia) W Bowrey	2	2	2
(Australia) C Dibley	1	3	6
4	(United States) C Richey	6	6	8

Fourth round
(Hungary) I Gulyás	6	7	4	6
4	(United States) C Richey	4	5	6	2

==== Section 7 ====
First round
(Romania) P Marmureanu	6	4	6	4	8
(South Africa) R Maud	4	6	2	6	6
(Japan) J Kuki	6	6	11
(Australia) P Dent	0	3	9
(United Kingdom) G Battrick	6	6	0	6	7
(Czechoslovakia) F Pála	3	8	6	2	5
(Czechoslovakia) J Hřebec	2	4	1
9	(United States) B Lutz	6	6	6
(Colombia) J Velasco Sr.	7	6	6
(United Kingdom) D Lloyd	5	2	3
(Chile) J Pinto-Bravo	4	6	6	6
(Italy) E Di Matteo	6	2	1	2
(Soviet Union) T Leius	2	4	1
(France) P Proisy	6	6	6
Q	(Italy) T Zugarelli	1	2	5
8	(Soviet Union) A Metreveli	6	6	7

Second round
(Romania) P Marmureanu	0	3	4
(Japan) J Kuki	6	6	6
(United Kingdom) G Battrick	6	1	6	2	2
9	(United States) R Lutz	4	6	1	6	6
(Colombia) J Velasco Sr.	8	4	6	1	4
(Chile) J Pinto-Bravo	6	6	3	6	5^{r}
(France) P Proisy	6	6	7
8	(Soviet Union) A Metreveli	4	4	5

Third round
(Japan) J Kuki	1	7	7	4	4
9	(United States) R Lutz	6	5	5	6	6
(Chile) J Pinto-Bravo	1	0	3
(France) P Proisy	6	6	6

Fourth round
9	(United States) R Lutz	4	7	5
(France) P Proisy	6	9	7

==== Section 8 ====
First round
(Indonesia) A Wijono	3	1	1
(France) F Jauffret	6	6	6
Q	(Socialist Federal Republic of Yugoslavia) Z Ivančić	4	3	3
(Czechoslovakia) M Holeček	6	6	6
Q	(Colombia) I Molina	4	4	6	8	3
(France) J-B Chanfreau	6	6	2	6	6
(Soviet Union) A Volkov	6	9	6
16	(Chile) J Fillol Sr.	3	7	3
(Australia) B Carmichael	6	6	6
(France) P Beust	2	0	1
(Australia) G Masters	6	6	6
(New Zealand) O Parun	4	2	2
(France) J-P Courcol	6	4	6	6
LL	(Romania) S Mureşan	3	6	3	3
(Poland) W Gasiorek	1	1	3
1	(Czechoslovakia) J Kodeš	6	6	6

Second round
(France) F Jauffret	4	6	6	6
(Czechoslovakia) M Holeček	6	4	3	1
(France) J-B Chanfreau	6	6	6
(Soviet Union) A Volkov	3	4	2
(Australia) B Carmichael	6	4	6	6
(Australia) G Masters	2	6	3	2
(France) J-P Courcol	3	0	5
1	(Czechoslovakia) J Kodeš	6	6	7

Third round
(France) F Jauffret	6	7	6
(France) J-B Chanfreau	3	5	1
(Australia) B Carmichael	4	7	2
1	(Czechoslovakia) J Kodeš	6	9	6

Fourth round
(France) F Jauffret	6	2	7	0	4
1	(Czechoslovakia) J Kodeš	4	6	5	6	6

Preceded by 1971 Australian Open – Men's singles	Grand Slam men's singles	Succeeded by 1971 Wimbledon Championships – Men's singles
