= Rainer Kuhlmey =

German tennis player (born 1942)

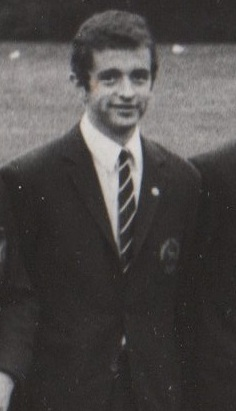
- Country (sports): Germany
- Born: 16 July 1942 (age 83) Wuppertal Germany

Singles

Grand Slam singles results
- French Open: 1R (1971)

Rainer Kuhlmey (born 16 July 1942 Wuppertal, Germany) is a retired German tennis player.

He has won several national titles including the 1973 German Tennis-Hochschulmeisterschaften, the 1970 Wesseling tournament and the 1968 German Tennis Team Championships with Eintracht Frankfurt in a 6-3 team victory versus TV Hannover and took part in several international tournaments, such as Nice, Beaulieu and Cannes Championships, notably defeating former ATP no. 36 ranked Patrice Dominguez and former ATP no. 6 ranked José Higueras at the 1970 Nice TC Mediterranee tournament.

In addition, he represented Germany as the only German player in the main draw of the 1971 French Open – Men's Singles competition at Roland Garros, Paris. Prior, he succeeded in the Qualifying Draw, winning one of the longest three consecutive matches in tennis history in a total of 14 and a half hours.

His real strength was to play doubles. Amongst other national doubles titles, most notably, he beat the former Davis Cup players Jürgen Fassbender/Karl Meiler in a spectacular doubles final of the 1969 Kassel Wilhelmshöhe tournament, partnering Dr. Rainer Janson, in two straight sets 9-7 6-4. As a result of his successes, he was nominated to the German national team against Norway in 1969.

Apart from his career in sports, he graduated in economics (Diplom-Volkswirt) at the University of Marburg. Moreover, he partnered with roulette legend Richard Jarecki, conquering roulette and Black Jack by employing sophisticated empirical methods.
