= Pam Austin =

American tennis player

- Full name: Pamela Austin
- Country (sports): United States
- Born: March 12, 1950 (age 76)
- Height: 6 ft 0 in (183 cm)
- College: UCLA

Singles

Grand Slam singles results
- French Open: 2R (1971)
- US Open: 2R (1971)

Pamela Austin (born March 12, 1950) is an American former professional tennis player.

== College career ==
Austin played college tennis at UCLA and won a Pacific-8 Conference doubles championship while she was there.

== Grand Slam singles tournament timeline ==
Key
W	F	SF	QF	#R	RR	Q#	DNQ	A	NH

(W) winner; (F) finalist; (SF) semifinalist; (QF) quarterfinalist; (#R) rounds 4, 3, 2, 1; (RR) round-robin stage; (Q#) qualification round; (DNQ) did not qualify; (A) absent; (NH) not held; (SR) strike rate (events won / competed); (W–L) win–loss record.

Tournament	1968	1969	1970	1971	1972
Australian Open	A	A	A	A	A
French Open	A	A	1R	2R	Q3
Wimbledon	A	A	A	A	A
US Open	1R	1R	1R	2R	1R

== World TeamTennis ==
Austin, along with her brother Jeff, was a member of the 1974 World TeamTennis champion Denver Racquets.

== Family life ==
Austin's younger sister Tracy was a two-time US Open champion. In addition to her brother Jeff, Austin's brothers Doug and John were also professional tennis players. She is the sister-in-law of fitness instructor and author Denise Austin, who is married to Jeff.

== See also ==
- List of female tennis players
