= Takeshi Koura =

Japanese tennis player (born 1942)

- Country (sports): Japan
- Born: 13 November 1942 (age 83) Nishinomiya, Hyōgo, Japan
- Height: 176 cm (5 ft 9 in)

Singles
- Career record: 2–6
- Highest ranking: No. 155 (15 October 1973)

Grand Slam singles results
- French Open: 2R (1967)

Doubles
- Career record: 0–2

Grand Slam doubles results
- French Open: 2R (1971)

Grand Slam mixed doubles results
- Wimbledon: 2R (1971)
Medal record
Representing Japan
Summer Universiade
Silver medal – second place	1963 Porto Alegre	Men's doubles
Silver medal – second place	1967 Tokyo	Men's doubles
Bronze medal – third place	1967 Tokyo	Mixed doubles

Takeshi Koura (小浦 猛志, Koura Takeshi; born 13 November 1942) is a Japanese former professional tennis player.

Koura was born in Nishinomiya and competed on the international circuit in the 1960s and 1970s.

While studying commerce in the 1960s he represented Japan at the University Games, where he won two silver medals and a bronze medal in doubles events.

Koura was the first Malaysian Open champion in 1964 (the event replaced the Malaya Championships). Koura played in the main draw of the 1967 French Championships and was runner up at the 1971 Tokyo Indoor.

In the early 1970s he was a member Japan's Davis Cup team, featuring in three ties as a doubles player. This included a win over Australia in Tokyo in 1971, which was the first time in 50 years the Japanese had defeated the Australians.

Koura opened up a tennis college in Osaka in the mid-1970s, which has produced players such as Kimiko Date and Yuko Hosoki. He is a former captain of the Japanese Fed Cup team.

== See also ==
- List of Japan Davis Cup team representatives
