= 1971 French Open – Women's singles =

Women's singles
- 1971 French Open

Final
- Champion: (Australia) Evonne Goolagong
- Runner-up: (Australia) Helen Gourlay
- Score: 6–3, 7–5

Details
- Draw: 64
- Seeds: 8

Events
Singles	men	women		boys	girls
Doubles	men	women	mixed	boys	girls
WC Singles	men	women	quad
WC Doubles	men	women	quad
Legends	−45	45+	women
- French Open

Evonne Goolagong defeated Helen Gourlay in the final, 6–3, 7–5 to win the women's singles tennis title at the 1971 French Open. It was her first major singles title. Goolagong did not lose a set during the tournament. She was making her tournament debut.

Margaret Court was the two-time defending champion, but was defeated in the third round by Gail Chanfreau. This marked the first time since the 1964 US Championships that Court failed to reach a major quarterfinal, a run of 19 consecutive majors. It was her earliest exit from a major since 1962 Wimbledon.

== Seeds ==
The seeded players are listed below. Evonne Goolagong is the champion; others show the round in which they were eliminated.

1. (Australia) Margaret Court (third round)
2. (United Kingdom) Virginia Wade (first round)
3. (Australia) Evonne Goolagong (champion)
4. (United States) Nancy Gunter (semifinals)
5. (West Germany) Helga Masthoff (first round)
6. (France) Françoise Dürr (quarterfinals)
7. (United States) Julie Heldman (third round)
8. (Soviet Union) Olga Morozova (second round)

== Draw ==
=== Key ===
- Q = Qualifier
- WC = Wild card
- LL = Lucky loser
- r = Retired

=== Finals ===
Quarterfinals
(France) Gail Chanfreau	4	6	3
(Australia) Helen Gourlay	6	3	6
4	(United States) Nancy Richey	6	6
(Australia) Lesley Bowrey	2	4
6	(France) Françoise Dürr	3	0
3	(Australia) Evonne Goolagong	6	6
(Netherlands) Marijke Schaar	6	6
(United States) Linda Tuero	2	3

Semifinals
(Australia) Helen Gourlay	6	6
4	(United States) Nancy Richey	2	3
3	(Australia) Evonne Goolagong	6	6
(Netherlands) Marijke Schaar	4	1

Finals
(Australia) Helen Gourlay	3	5
3	(Australia) Evonne Goolagong	6	7

=== Earlier rounds ===
==== Section 1 ====
First round
(Sweden) Wennerström	0	1
1	(Australia) Court	6	6
Q	(Argentina) Giscafré	0	2
(Australia) Melville	6	6
(United States) Teeguarden	2	2
(France) Chanfreau	6	6
Q	(Chile) Pinto Bravo	2	3
(Czechoslovakia) Palmeová-West	6	6
Q	(France) Fuchs	2	0
8	(Soviet Union) Morozova	6	6
(South Africa) Kirk	4	3
(Japan) Sawamatsu	6	6
(United Kingdom) Greenwood	2	5
(Sweden) Sandberg	6	7
(United States) Martinez	1	4
(Australia) Gourlay	6	6

Second round
1	(Australia) Court	6	6
(Australia) Melville	2	1
(France) Chanfreau	6	6
(Czechoslovakia) Palmeová-West	1	1
8	(Soviet Union) Morozova	4	3
(Japan) Sawamatsu	6	6
(Sweden) Sandberg	7	5	3
(Australia) Gourlay	5	7	6

Third round
1	(Australia) Court	3	4
(France) Chanfreau	6	6
(Japan) Sawamatsu	6	2	5
(Australia) Gourlay	3	6	7

Quarterfinals
(France) Chanfreau	4	6	3
(Australia) Gourlay	6	3	6

==== Section 2 ====
First round
Q	(Colombia) Fernández-De Soto	4	1
4	(United States) Richey	6	6
Q	(France) Repoux	1	0
(Australia) Hunt	6	6
(France) Spinoza	w/o
Q	(West Germany) Ebbinghaus
(United Kingdom) Cooper	6	1	3
(South Africa) Rossouw	3	6	6
5	(West Germany) Masthoff	w/o
(Soviet Union) Ivanova
Q	(South Africa) Botha	1	2
(United Kingdom) Shaw	6	6
(Italy) Porzio	1	3
(Australia) Bowrey	6	6
(Australia) Moore	3	6	1
(France) Bouteleux	6	4	6

Second round
4	(United States) Richey	7	6
(Australia) Hunt	5	0
Q	(West Germany) Ebbinghaus	3	6	3
(South Africa) Rossouw	6	4	6
(Soviet Union) Ivanova	3	2
(United Kingdom) Shaw	6	6
(Australia) Bowrey	6	6
(France) Bouteleux	3	1

Third round
4	(United States) Richey	7	6
(South Africa) Rossouw	5	2
(United Kingdom) Shaw	1	2
(Australia) Bowrey	6	6

Quarterfinals
4	(United States) Richey	6	6
(Australia) Bowrey	2	4

==== Section 3 ====
First round
(Indonesia) Kaligis	0	1
(Netherlands) Stöve	6	6
Q	(Hungary) Borka	2	2
(United States) Ziegenfuss	6	6
Q	(Austria) Pachta	2	7	2
(United States) Austin	6	5	6
(Czechoslovakia) Holubová	2	6
6	(France) Dürr	6	8
(United States) Fretz	7	5	6
(Italy) Pericoli	5	7	8
(Hungary) Szabó	1	6
(South Africa) Emmanuel	6	6
(France) Darmon	4	2
Q	(Australia) Gilchrist	6	6
Q	(South Africa) Koudelka	3	1
3	(Australia) Goolagong	6	6

Second round
(Netherlands) Stöve	9	6
(United States) Ziegenfuss	7	2
(United States) Austin	1	0
6	(France) Dürr	6	6
(Italy) Pericoli	6	6
(South Africa) Emmanuel	4	1
Q	(Australia) Gilchrist	1	1
3	(Australia) Goolagong	6	6

Third round
(Netherlands) Stöve	5	7	4
6	(France) Dürr	7	5	6
(Italy) Pericoli	2	2
3	(Australia) Goolagong	6	6

Quarterfinals
6	(France) Dürr	3	0
3	(Australia) Goolagong	6	6

==== Section 4 ====
First round
(Indonesia) Liem	7	4
(Netherlands) Walhof	9	6
(France) de Roubin	6	4	4
(Netherlands) Schaar	4	6	6
(Australia) Harris	2	7
Q	(United States) Vest	6	9
Q	(South Africa) Van Brandis	0	0
7	(United States) Heldman	6	6
(Uruguay) Bonicelli	4	6	4
(Italy) Nasuelli	6	3	6
(Czechoslovakia) Neumannová	5	6	7
(Hungary) Szörényi	7	4	9
(United States) Pigeon	6	4	7
(Sweden) Bentzer	4	6	9
2	(United Kingdom) Wade	5
(United States) Tuero	7

Second round
(Netherlands) Walhof	6	4	1
(Netherlands) Schaar	3	6	6
Q	(United States) Vest	2	6
7	(United States) Heldman	6	8
(Italy) Nasuelli	6	4	6
(Hungary) Szörényi	3	6	1
(Sweden) Bentzer	5	2
(United States) Tuero	7	6

Third round
(Netherlands) Schaar	4	6	6
7	(United States) Heldman	6	3	4
(Italy) Nasuelli	7	3
(United States) Tuero	9	6

Quarterfinals
(Netherlands) Schaar	6	6
(United States) Tuero	2	3

Preceded by 1971 Australian Open – Women's singles	Grand Slam women's singles	Succeeded by 1971 Wimbledon Championships – Women's singles
