= Janine Lieffrig =

French tennis player

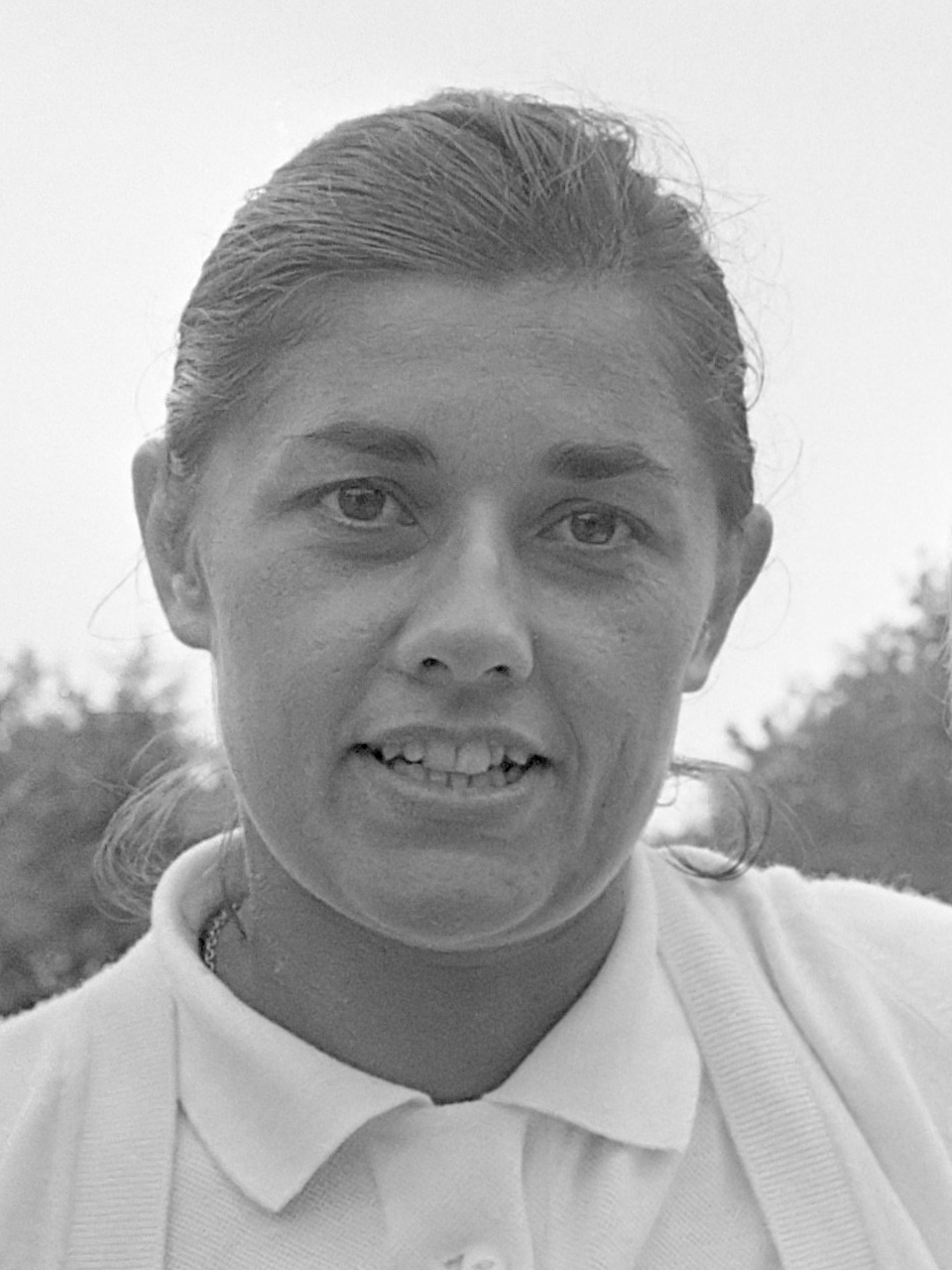
- Jeanine Lieffrig (1966)
- Country (sports): France
- Born: 12 April 1938 (age 87)
- Plays: Right-handed

Singles

Grand Slam singles results
- Australian Open: 2R (1965)
- French Open: 4R (1962, 1966)
- Wimbledon: 3R (1968)
- US Open: 3R (1962, 1963, 1964)

Doubles

Grand Slam doubles results
- Australian Open: QF (1965)
- French Open: F (1965)
- Wimbledon: F (1965)

Grand Slam mixed doubles results
- Australian Open: 3R (1965)
- French Open: QF (1964, 1966, 1971)
- Wimbledon: QF (1963)
Medal record
Representing France
Tennis
Summer Universiade
Silver medal – second place	1959 Turin	Mixed Doubles

Janine Lieffrig (born 12 April 1938) is a French former tennis player.

Lieffrig reached the doubles final at the 1965 Wimbledon Championships and the 1965 French Championships with compatriot Françoise Dürr. At the French, they were defeated in the final in straight sets by Margaret Court and Lesley Turner Bowrey, and at Wimbledon, they lost the final to Maria Bueno and Billie Jean King in straight sets.

From 1963 to 1968, she competed in five editions of the Wimbledon Championships. In the singles, her best result was reaching the third round in 1968 and in the mixed doubles she reached the quarterfinals in 1963 with Boro Jovanović. In 1965, she made it to the quarterfinals of the Australian Championships partnering Dürr.

Lieffrig played for the French Federation Cup team from 1963 to 1968 and compiled a record of 12 wins and nine losses.

She played on the seniors tour representing South Africa and became World Champion in the 70+ singles category.

== Grand Slam finals ==
=== Doubles: 2 (2 runners-up) ===
Result	Year	Championship	Surface	Partner	Opponents	Score
Loss	1965	French Championships	Clay	(France) Françoise Dürr	(Australia) Margaret Court (Australia) Lesley Turner Bowrey	3–6, 1–6
Loss	1965	Wimbledon	Grass	(France) Françoise Dürr	(Brazil) Maria Bueno (United States) Billie Jean King	2–6, 5–7
