= Sever Mureșan =

Romanian tennis player (1948–2024)

- Full name: Andrei Sever Mureșan
- Country (sports): Romania
- Born: 23 October 1948; Câmpia Turzii, Romania
- Died: 25 September 2024 (aged 75); Dijon, France

Singles
- Highest ranking: No. 297 (29 July 1974)

Grand Slam singles results
- French Open: 1R (1971)

Doubles

Grand Slam doubles results
- French Open: 2R (1971)

Sever Mureșan (23 October 1948 – 25 September 2024) was a Romanian tennis player. His highest ATP ranking was number 297 achieved on 29 July 1974. Mureșan died in Dijon, France on 25 September 2024, at the age of 75.
