= 1971 French Open =

- Date: 24 May – 6 June 1971
- Edition: 70
- Category: 41st Grand Slam (ITF)
- Surface: Clay
- Location: Paris (XVI^{e}), France
- Venue: Stade Roland Garros

Champions

Men's singles
- (Czechoslovakia) Jan Kodeš

Women's singles
- (Australia) Evonne Goolagong

Men's doubles
- (United States) Arthur Ashe / (United States) Marty Riessen

Women's doubles
- (France) Gail Sherriff Chanfreau / (France) Françoise Dürr

Mixed doubles
- (France) Françoise Dürr / (France) Jean-Claude Barclay
← 1970 ·	French Open	· 1972 →

The 1971 French Open was a tennis tournament that took place on the outdoor clay courts at the Stade Roland Garros in Paris, France. The tournament ran from 24 May until 6 June. It was the 70th staging of the French Open, and the second Grand Slam tennis event of 1971. Jan Kodeš and Evonne Goolagong won the singles titles.

== Finals ==
=== Men's singles ===
(Czechoslovakia) Jan Kodeš defeated (Romania) Ilie Năstase, 8–6, 6–2, 2–6, 7–5

• It was Kodeš' 2nd career Grand Slam singles title and his 2nd (consecutive) title at the French Open.

=== Women's singles ===
(Australia) Evonne Goolagong defeated (Australia) Helen Gourlay, 6–3, 7–5

• It was Goolagong's first career Grand Slam singles title.

=== Men's doubles ===
(United States) Arthur Ashe / (United States) Marty Riessen defeated (United States) Tom Gorman / (United States) Stan Smith, 6–8, 4–6, 6–3, 6–4, 11–9

• It was Ashe's 1st career Grand Slam doubles title and his 1st and only title at the French Open.
• It was Riessen's 1st career Grand Slam doubles title and his 1st and only title at the French Open.

=== Women's doubles ===
(France) Gail Sherriff Chanfreau / (France) Françoise Dürr defeated (Australia) Helen Gourlay / (Australia) Kerry Harris, 6–4, 6–1

• It was Chanfreau's third career Grand Slam doubles title, her second during the Open Era and her third title at the French Open.
• It was Dürr's sixth career Grand Slam doubles title, her fifth during the Open Era and her fifth (consecutive) and last title at the French Open.

=== Mixed doubles ===
(France) Françoise Dürr / (France) Jean-Claude Barclay defeated (United Kingdom) Winnie Shaw / (Soviet Union) Toomas Leius, 6–2, 6–4

• It was Dürr's 2nd career Grand Slam mixed doubles title and her 2nd title at the French Open.
• It was Barclay's 2nd career Grand Slam mixed doubles title and his 2nd title at the French Open.

Preceded by 1971 Australian Open	Grand Slams	Succeeded by 1971 Wimbledon Championships
