= 1973 WTA Tour =

Women's tennis circuit

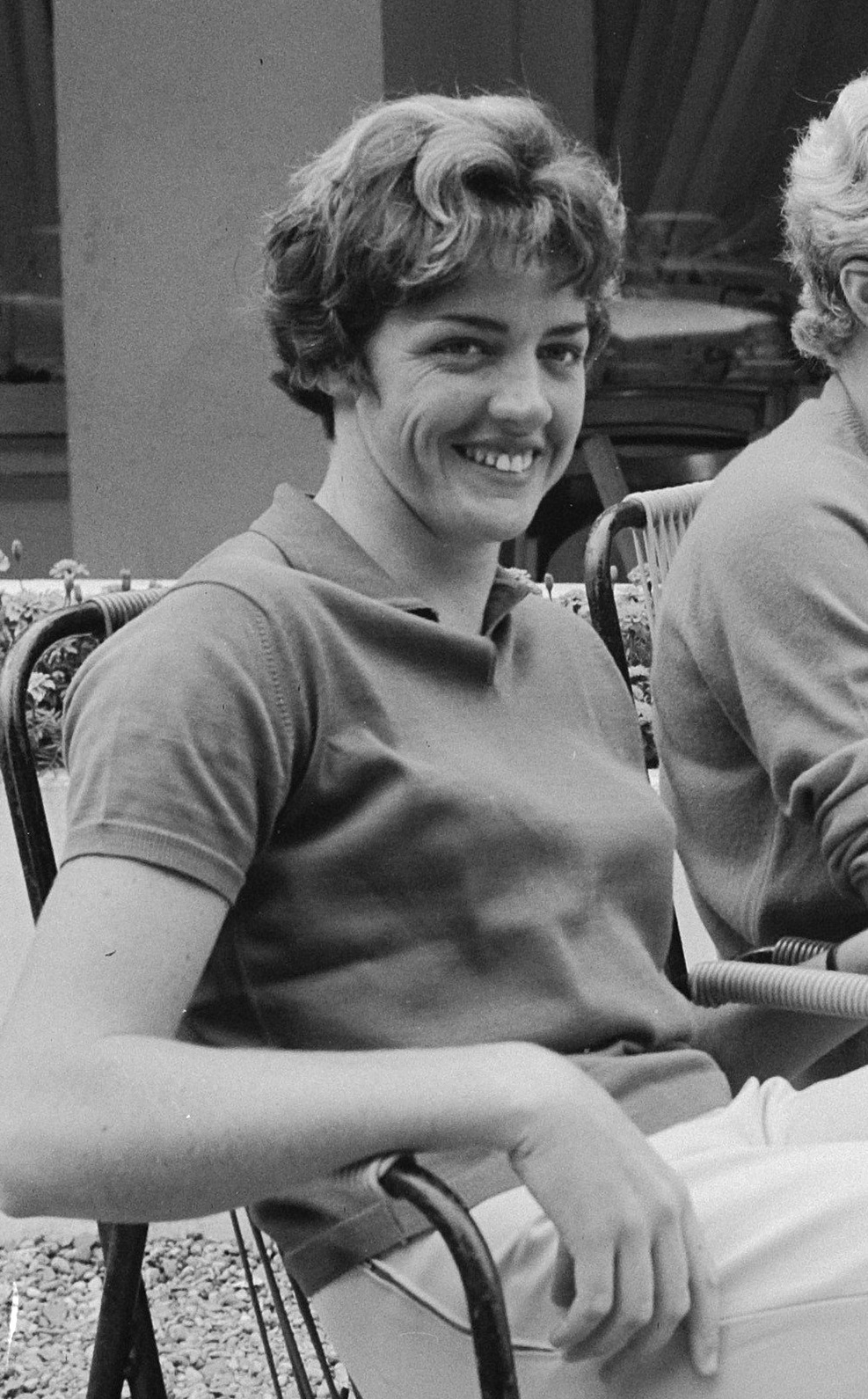
- Margaret Court (pictured in 1964) won 18 tour titles during the season.

Details
- Duration: 26 December 1972 – 26 November 1973
- Edition: 1st
- Tournaments: 65
- Categories: Grand Slam (4); Year-end championships Virginia Slims Circuit (22); Commercial Union Grand Prix (23); Non-Tour Events (13)

Achievements (singles)
- Most titles: (Australia) Margaret Court (18)
- Most finals: (Australia) Margaret Court (19)

The 1973 WTA Tour was also the first season of the WTA Tour was officially formed by Billie Jean King following a meeting held in the Gloucester Hotel in London during the week before Wimbledon. It was composed of the third annual Virginia Slims Circuit a tour of tennis tournaments for female tennis players, sponsored by Virginia Slims cigarettes. and the ILTF Commercial Union Assurance Grand Prix, a circuit of tournaments sponsored by Commercial Union Assurance Company.

== Schedule ==
This is a calendar of all events sponsored by Virginia Slims in the year 1973, with player progression documented from the quarterfinals stage. The table also includes the Grand Slam tournaments, the 1973 Virginia Slims Championships and the 1973 Federation Cup.

Key

Grand Slam tournaments
Virginia Slims championships
Virginia Slims Circuit
ILTF Commercial Union Assurance Grand Prix
ILTF
Team events

=== December (1972) ===
Week	Tournament	Champions	Runners-up	Semifinalists	Quarterfinalists
25 Dec; 1 Jan	Australian Open; Melbourne, Australia; Grand Slam (A); Grass – 64S/32D; Singles – Doubles	(Australia) Margaret Court; 6–4, 7–5	(Australia) Evonne Goolagong	(Australia) Kerry Melville (Japan) Kazuko Sawamatsu	(Australia) Karen Krantzcke (Australia) Dianne Fromholtz (United Kingdom) Virginia Wade (Australia) Kerry Harris
25 Dec; 1 Jan	Australian Open; Melbourne, Australia; Grand Slam (A); Grass – 64S/32D; Singles – Doubles	(Australia) Margaret Court (United Kingdom) Virginia Wade; 6–4, 6–4	(Australia) Kerry Harris (Australia) Kerry Melville	(Australia) Kerry Melville (Japan) Kazuko Sawamatsu	(Australia) Karen Krantzcke (Australia) Dianne Fromholtz (United Kingdom) Virginia Wade (Australia) Kerry Harris

=== January ===
Week	Tournament	Champions	Runners-up	Semifinalists	Quarterfinalists
15 Jan	British Motor Cars Invitational; San Francisco, United States; Virginia Slims; Carpet (i) – $25,000 – 16S/8D	(Australia) Margaret Court; 6–3, 6–3	(Australia) Kerry Melville	(United States) Valerie Ziegenfuss (United States) Rosie Casals	(United States) Marcie Louie (United States) Nancy Gunter (France) Françoise Dürr (United States) Wendy Overton
15 Jan	British Motor Cars Invitational; San Francisco, United States; Virginia Slims; Carpet (i) – $25,000 – 16S/8D	(Australia) Margaret Court (Australia) Lesley Hunt; 6–1, 7–5	(United States) Wendy Overton (United States) Valerie Ziegenfuss	(United States) Valerie Ziegenfuss (United States) Rosie Casals	(United States) Marcie Louie (United States) Nancy Gunter (France) Françoise Dürr (United States) Wendy Overton
22 Jan	British Motor Cars of Los Angeles; Los Angeles, United States; Virginia Slims; Carpet (i) – $25,000 – 16S/8D	(Australia) Margaret Court; 7–5, 6–7^{(1–5)}, 7–5	(United States) Nancy Gunter	3rd: (Netherlands) Betty Stöve; 4th: (United States) Rosie Casals	(Australia) Karen Krantzcke (Australia) Kerry Melville (France) Françoise Dürr (United States) Valerie Ziegenfuss
22 Jan	British Motor Cars of Los Angeles; Los Angeles, United States; Virginia Slims; Carpet (i) – $25,000 – 16S/8D	(United States) Rosie Casals (United States) Julie Heldman; Walkover	(Australia) Margaret Court (Australia) Lesley Hunt	3rd: (Netherlands) Betty Stöve; 4th: (United States) Rosie Casals	(Australia) Karen Krantzcke (Australia) Kerry Melville (France) Françoise Dürr (United States) Valerie Ziegenfuss
29 Jan	Virginia Slims of Washington; Washington, D.C., United States; Virginia Slims; Carpet (i) – $25,000 – 32S/8D	(Australia) Margaret Court; 6–1, 6–2	(Australia) Kerry Melville	3rd: (United States) Rosie Casals; 4th: (United States) Janet Newberry	(United States) Julie Heldman (Netherlands) Betty Stöve (United States) Wendy Overton (United States) Valerie Ziegenfuss
29 Jan	Virginia Slims of Washington; Washington, D.C., United States; Virginia Slims; Carpet (i) – $25,000 – 32S/8D	(United States) Rosie Casals (United States) Julie Heldman; 6–3, 6–3	(Australia) Kerry Harris (Australia) Kerry Melville	3rd: (United States) Rosie Casals; 4th: (United States) Janet Newberry	(United States) Julie Heldman (Netherlands) Betty Stöve (United States) Wendy Overton (United States) Valerie Ziegenfuss

=== February ===
Week	Tournament	Champions	Runners-up	Semifinalists	Quarterfinalists
5 Feb	Barnett Bank Classic; Miami, United States; Virginia Slims; Hard – $30,000	(Australia) Margaret Court; 4–6, 6–1, 7–5	(Australia) Kerry Melville	3rd: (United States) Rosie Casals; 4th: (Australia) Karen Krantzcke	(South Africa) Laura Rossouw (United States) Julie Heldman (United States) Valerie Ziegenfuss (Australia) Wendy Paish
5 Feb	Barnett Bank Classic; Miami, United States; Virginia Slims; Hard – $30,000	(France) Françoise Dürr (Netherlands) Betty Stöve; 4–6, 6–2, 6–3	(United States) Rosie Casals (United States) Billie Jean King	3rd: (United States) Rosie Casals; 4th: (Australia) Karen Krantzcke	(South Africa) Laura Rossouw (United States) Julie Heldman (United States) Valerie Ziegenfuss (Australia) Wendy Paish
19 Feb	Virginia Slims of Indianapolis; Indianapolis, United States; Virginia Slims; Hard (i) – $25,000	(United States) Billie Jean King; 5–7, 6–2, 6–4	(United States) Rosie Casals	3rd: (Australia) Margaret Court; 4th: (Australia) Lesley Hunt	(Australia) Kerry Harris (United Kingdom) Corinne Molesworth (United States) Pam Teeguarden (Australia) Kerry Melville
19 Feb	Virginia Slims of Indianapolis; Indianapolis, United States; Virginia Slims; Hard (i) – $25,000	(United States) Rosie Casals (United States) Billie Jean King; 7–6, 6–4	(Australia) Margaret Court (Australia) Lesley Hunt	3rd: (Australia) Margaret Court; 4th: (Australia) Lesley Hunt	(Australia) Kerry Harris (United Kingdom) Corinne Molesworth (United States) Pam Teeguarden (Australia) Kerry Melville
26 Feb	Virginia Slims of Detroit; Detroit, United States; Virginia Slims; Carpet (i) – $25,000	(Australia) Margaret Court; 7–6, 6–3	(Australia) Kerry Melville	3rd: (United States) Billie Jean King; 4th: (United States) Rosie Casals	(Australia) Lesley Hunt (United States) Julie Heldman (United States) Laura duPont (United States) Valerie Ziegenfuss
26 Feb	Virginia Slims of Detroit; Detroit, United States; Virginia Slims; Carpet (i) – $25,000	(United States) Rosie Casals (United States) Billie Jean King; 6–3, 3–6, 6–1	(Australia) Karen Krantzcke (Netherlands) Betty Stöve	3rd: (United States) Billie Jean King; 4th: (United States) Rosie Casals	(Australia) Lesley Hunt (United States) Julie Heldman (United States) Laura duPont (United States) Valerie Ziegenfuss
26 Feb	Fort Lauderdale Open; Fort Lauderdale, United States; Grand Prix (A); Clay – $20,000 – 16S/8D	(United States) Chris Evert; 6–1, 6–2	(United Kingdom) Virginia Wade	(United States) Linda Tuero (Australia) Evonne Goolagong	(Czechoslovakia) Marie Neumannová (Czechoslovakia) Martina Navratilova (United States) Jeanne Evert (United States) Patti Hogan
26 Feb	Fort Lauderdale Open; Fort Lauderdale, United States; Grand Prix (A); Clay – $20,000 – 16S/8D	(France) Gail Chanfreau (United Kingdom) Virginia Wade; 4–6, 6–3, 6–3	(Australia) Evonne Goolagong (Australia) Janet Young	(United States) Linda Tuero (Australia) Evonne Goolagong	(Czechoslovakia) Marie Neumannová (Czechoslovakia) Martina Navratilova (United States) Jeanne Evert (United States) Patti Hogan

=== March ===
Week	Tournament	Champions	Runners-up	Semifinalists	Quarterfinalists
5 Mar	Virginia Slims of Chicago; Chicago, United States; Virginia Slims; Carpet – $30,000	(Australia) Margaret Court; 6–2, 4–6, 6–4	(United States) Billie Jean King	(Australia) Kerry Melville (United States) Rosie Casals	(United States) Kristien Kemmer (United States) Pam Teeguarden (United States) Janet Newberry (United States) Julie Heldman
5 Mar	Virginia Slims of Chicago; Chicago, United States; Virginia Slims; Carpet – $30,000	(United States) Rosie Casals (United States) Billie Jean King; 6–4, 6–2	(Australia) Karen Krantzcke (Netherlands) Betty Stöve	(Australia) Kerry Melville (United States) Rosie Casals	(United States) Kristien Kemmer (United States) Pam Teeguarden (United States) Janet Newberry (United States) Julie Heldman
5 Mar	Maureen Connolly Brinker Memorial; Dallas, United States; Grand Prix (A); Hard (i) – $37,210 – 32S/16D	(United Kingdom) Virginia Wade; 6–4, 6–1	(Australia) Evonne Goolagong	(United States) Chris Evert (Japan) Kazuko Sawamatsu	(United States) Marita Redondo (United States) Linda Tuero (West Germany) Katja Ebbinghaus (United States) Sharon Walsh
5 Mar	Maureen Connolly Brinker Memorial; Dallas, United States; Grand Prix (A); Hard (i) – $37,210 – 32S/16D	(Australia) Evonne Goolagong (Australia) Janet Young; 6–3, 6–2	(France) Gail Chanfreau (United Kingdom) Virginia Wade	(United States) Chris Evert (Japan) Kazuko Sawamatsu	(United States) Marita Redondo (United States) Linda Tuero (West Germany) Katja Ebbinghaus (United States) Sharon Walsh
12 Mar	Virginia Slims of Richmond; Richmond, United States; Virginia Slims; Clay – $25,000	(Australia) Margaret Court; 6–2, 6–1	(United States) Janet Newberry	3rd: (Netherlands) Betty Stöve; 4th: (United States) Julie Heldman	(United States) Pam Teeguarden (United States) Valerie Ziegenfuss (United States) Marcie Louie (United States) Nancy Gunter
12 Mar	Virginia Slims of Richmond; Richmond, United States; Virginia Slims; Clay – $25,000	(Australia) Margaret Court (Australia) Lesley Hunt; 6–2, 7–6^{(5–4)}	(Australia) Karen Krantzcke (Netherlands) Betty Stöve	3rd: (Netherlands) Betty Stöve; 4th: (United States) Julie Heldman	(United States) Pam Teeguarden (United States) Valerie Ziegenfuss (United States) Marcie Louie (United States) Nancy Gunter
12 Mar	U.S. National Women's Indoor; Hingham, United States; Grand Prix (C); Carpet (i) – $20,000 – 16S/16D	(Australia) Evonne Goolagong; 6–4, 6–4	(United Kingdom) Virginia Wade	(Soviet Union) Olga Morozova (United States) Linda Tuero	(United Kingdom) Jackie Fayter (Czechoslovakia) Marie Neumannová (Colombia) Isabel Fernández de Soto (France) Gail Chanfreau
12 Mar	U.S. National Women's Indoor; Hingham, United States; Grand Prix (C); Carpet (i) – $20,000 – 16S/16D	(Soviet Union) Marina Kroschina (Soviet Union) Olga Morozova; 6–2, 6–4	(Australia) Evonne Goolagong (Australia) Janet Young	(Soviet Union) Olga Morozova (United States) Linda Tuero	(United Kingdom) Jackie Fayter (Czechoslovakia) Marie Neumannová (Colombia) Isabel Fernández de Soto (France) Gail Chanfreau
19 Mar	Akron Open; Akron, United States; Grand Prix (B); Carpet (i) – $25,000 – 16S/8D	(United States) Chris Evert; 6–3, 6–4	(Soviet Union) Olga Morozova	(Soviet Union) Marina Kroschina (United States) Marita Redondo	(United Kingdom) Virginia Wade (United States) Linda Tuero (Colombia) Isabel Fernández de Soto (United States) Sue Stap
19 Mar	Akron Open; Akron, United States; Grand Prix (B); Carpet (i) – $25,000 – 16S/8D	(United States) Patti Hogan (United States) Sharon Walsh; 7–5, 6–4	(Belgium) Michele Gurdal (United States) Patricia Bostrom	(Soviet Union) Marina Kroschina (United States) Marita Redondo	(United Kingdom) Virginia Wade (United States) Linda Tuero (Colombia) Isabel Fernández de Soto (United States) Sue Stap
26 Mar	Virginia Slims of Tucson; Tucson, United States; Virginia Slims; Hard – $25,000 – 32S/12D	(Australia) Kerry Melville; 6–3, 6–3	(United States) Nancy Gunter	3rd: (United States) Rosie Casals; 4th: (United States) Valerie Ziegenfuss	(South Africa) Laura Rossouw (Australia) Kerry Harris (United States) Janet Newberry (United States) Wendy Overton
26 Mar	Virginia Slims of Tucson; Tucson, United States; Virginia Slims; Hard – $25,000 – 32S/12D	(United States) Janet Newberry (United States) Pam Teeguarden; 3–6, 7–6, 7–5	(Australia) Karen Krantzcke (Netherlands) Betty Stöve	3rd: (United States) Rosie Casals; 4th: (United States) Valerie Ziegenfuss	(South Africa) Laura Rossouw (Australia) Kerry Harris (United States) Janet Newberry (United States) Wendy Overton
26 Mar	Lady Gotham Classic; New York City, United States; Grand Prix (B); Carpet (i) – $30,000 – 16S	(United States) Chris Evert; 6–0, 6–4	(West Germany) Katja Ebbinghaus	(Soviet Union) Marina Kroschina (West Germany) Helga Niessen Masthoff	(Colombia) Isabel Fernández de Soto (Japan) Kazuko Sawamatsu (United States) Linda Tuero (West Germany) Heide Orth

=== April ===
Week	Tournament	Champions	Runners-up	Semifinalists	Quarterfinalists
2 Apr	Max-Pax Coffee Classic; Philadelphia, United States; Virginia Slims; Carpet (i) – $50,000 – 16S/8D	(Australia) Margaret Court; 6–1, 6–0	(Australia) Kerry Harris	3rd: (United States) Rosie Casals; 4th: (Australia) Lesley Hunt	(United States) Valerie Ziegenfuss (United States) Janet Newberry (United States) Nancy Gunter (Australia) Kerry Melville
2 Apr	Max-Pax Coffee Classic; Philadelphia, United States; Virginia Slims; Carpet (i) – $50,000 – 16S/8D	(Australia) Margaret Court (Australia) Lesley Hunt; 6–1, 3–6, 6–2	(France) Françoise Dürr (Netherlands) Betty Stöve	3rd: (United States) Rosie Casals; 4th: (Australia) Lesley Hunt	(United States) Valerie Ziegenfuss (United States) Janet Newberry (United States) Nancy Gunter (Australia) Kerry Melville
2 Apr	First Federal of Sarasota Open; Sarasota, United States; Grand Prix (C); Clay – $20,000 – 16S/8D	(United States) Chris Evert; 6–3, 6–2	(Australia) Evonne Goolagong	(United States) Patti Hogan (West Germany) Helga Niessen Masthoff	(France) Gail Chanfreau (Czechoslovakia) Marie Neumannová (United States) Sue Stap (Netherlands) Marijke Schaar
2 Apr	First Federal of Sarasota Open; Sarasota, United States; Grand Prix (C); Clay – $20,000 – 16S/8D	(United States) Patti Hogan (United States) Sharon Walsh; 4–6, 6–0, 6–3	(Czechoslovakia) Martina Navratilova (Czechoslovakia) Marie Neumannová	(United States) Patti Hogan (West Germany) Helga Niessen Masthoff	(France) Gail Chanfreau (Czechoslovakia) Marie Neumannová (United States) Sue Stap (Netherlands) Marijke Schaar
9 Apr	Virginia Slims of Boston; Boston, United States; Virginia Slims; Carpet (i) – $25,000	(Australia) Margaret Court; 6–2, 6–4	(United States) Billie Jean King	(United States) Rosie Casals (United States) Julie Heldman	(United States) Mona Schallau (Netherlands) Betty Stöve (United States) Valerie Ziegenfuss (Australia) Kerry Melville
9 Apr	Virginia Slims of Boston; Boston, United States; Virginia Slims; Carpet (i) – $25,000	(United States) Rosie Casals (United States) Billie Jean King; 6–4, 6–2	(France) Françoise Dürr (Netherlands) Betty Stöve	(United States) Rosie Casals (United States) Julie Heldman	(United States) Mona Schallau (Netherlands) Betty Stöve (United States) Valerie Ziegenfuss (Australia) Kerry Melville
9 Apr	Miami Beach Pros; Miami Beach, United States; Grand Prix (C); Clay – $20,000–48S	(United States) Chris Evert; 3–6, 6–3, 6–2	(Australia) Evonne Goolagong	(Netherlands) Marijke Schaar (West Germany) Helga Niessen Masthoff	(Colombia) Isabel Fernández de Soto (United States) Patti Hogan (United States) Linda Tuero (Czechoslovakia) Marie Neumannová
16 Apr	Virginia Slims of Jacksonville; Jacksonville, United States; Virginia Slims; Clay – $25,000	(Australia) Margaret Court; 5–7, 6–3, 6–1	(United States) Rosie Casals	3rd: (Australia) Kerry Melville; 4th: (United States) Wendy Overton	(United States) Valerie Ziegenfuss (United States) Janet Newberry (Australia) Karen Krantzcke (United States) Billie Jean King
16 Apr	Virginia Slims of Jacksonville; Jacksonville, United States; Virginia Slims; Clay – $25,000	(United States) Rosie Casals (United States) Billie Jean King; 7–6, 5–7, 6–3	(France) Françoise Dürr (Netherlands) Betty Stöve	3rd: (Australia) Kerry Melville; 4th: (United States) Wendy Overton	(United States) Valerie Ziegenfuss (United States) Janet Newberry (Australia) Karen Krantzcke (United States) Billie Jean King
16 Apr	St. Petersburg Masters; St. Petersburg, United States; Grand Prix (C); Clay – $18,800 – 32S/16D	(United States) Chris Evert; 6–2, 0–6, 6–4	(Australia) Evonne Goolagong	(United States) Marita Redondo (Czechoslovakia) Martina Navratilova	(United States) Patti Hogan (Colombia) Isabel Fernández de Soto (West Germany) Helga Niessen Masthoff (Netherlands) Marijke Schaar
16 Apr	St. Petersburg Masters; St. Petersburg, United States; Grand Prix (C); Clay – $18,800 – 32S/16D	(United States) Chris Evert (United States) Jeanne Evert; 6–2, 7–6	(Australia) Evonne Goolagong (Australia) Janet Young	(United States) Marita Redondo (Czechoslovakia) Martina Navratilova	(United States) Patti Hogan (Colombia) Isabel Fernández de Soto (West Germany) Helga Niessen Masthoff (Netherlands) Marijke Schaar
30 Apr	Family Circle Cup; Hilton Head Island, United States; Virginia Slims; Clay – $100,000 – 16S/8D	(United States) Rosie Casals; 3–6, 6–1, 7–5	(United States) Nancy Gunter	(Australia) Kerry Melville (United States) Billie Jean King	(Australia) Margaret Court (Netherlands) Betty Stöve (United States) Laurie Fleming (United States) Wendy Overton
30 Apr	Family Circle Cup; Hilton Head Island, United States; Virginia Slims; Clay – $100,000 – 16S/8D	(France) Françoise Dürr (Netherlands) Betty Stöve; 3–6, 6–4, 6–3	(United States) Rosie Casals (United States) Billie Jean King	(Australia) Kerry Melville (United States) Billie Jean King	(Australia) Margaret Court (Netherlands) Betty Stöve (United States) Laurie Fleming (United States) Wendy Overton
30 Apr	Federation Cup; Bad Homburg, West Germany; Federation Cup; Clay – 30 teams knockout	Australia; 3–0	South Africa	Romania; West Germany	Netherlands; Great Britain; United States; Indonesia

=== May ===
Week	Tournament	Champions	Runners-up	Semifinalists	Quarterfinalists
7 May	British Hard Court Championships; Bournemouth, Great Britain; Grand Prix (C); Clay – ?S/?D/32XD	(United Kingdom) Virginia Wade; 6–4, 6–4	(Australia) Evonne Goolagong	(Australia) Dianne Fromholtz (United Kingdom) Lindsey Beaven	(United Kingdom) Veronica Burton (United Kingdom) Glynis Coles (Australia) Wendy Turnbull (Australia) Christine Matison
7 May	British Hard Court Championships; Bournemouth, Great Britain; Grand Prix (C); Clay – ?S/?D/32XD	(Australia) Patricia Coleman (Australia) Wendy Turnbull; 7–5, 7–5	(Australia) Evonne Goolagong (Australia) Janet Young	(Australia) Dianne Fromholtz (United Kingdom) Lindsey Beaven	(United Kingdom) Veronica Burton (United Kingdom) Glynis Coles (Australia) Wendy Turnbull (Australia) Christine Matison
7 May	British Hard Court Championships; Bournemouth, Great Britain; Grand Prix (C); Clay – ?S/?D/32XD	(United Kingdom) Virginia Wade (South Africa) Frew McMillan; 6–2, 6–3	(South Africa) Ilana Kloss (South Africa) Bernard Mitton	(Australia) Dianne Fromholtz (United Kingdom) Lindsey Beaven	(United Kingdom) Veronica Burton (United Kingdom) Glynis Coles (Australia) Wendy Turnbull (Australia) Christine Matison
14 May	Mercedes-Benz Open; Lee-on-Solent, United Kingdom; Non-tour event Grass; Draw	(Australia) Evonne Goolagong; 6–3, 6–2	(South Africa) Pat Pretorius		
14 May	Mercedes-Benz Open; Lee-on-Solent, United Kingdom; Non-tour event Grass; Draw	(Australia) Evonne Goolagong (Australia) Janet Young; 6–1, 6–2	(United Kingdom) Jackie Fayter (United States) Peggy Michel		
14 May	Surrey Hardcourt Championships; Guildford, United Kingdom; Non-tour event Grass; Draw	(Australia) Dianne Fromholtz; 7–5, 6–3	(Japan) Kazuko Sawamatsu		
14 May	Surrey Hardcourt Championships; Guildford, United Kingdom; Non-tour event Grass; Draw	(United States) Patti Hogan / (United States) Sharon Walsh vs (United Kingdom) Lesley Charles / (United Kingdom) Glynis Coles; Title Shared			
21 May; 28 May	French Open; Paris, France; Grand Slam (AA); Clay (red) – 64S/45Q/32D/32X; Singles – Doubles – Mixed doubles	(Australia) Margaret Court; 6–7, 7–6, 6–4	(United States) Chris Evert	(France) Françoise Dürr (Australia) Evonne Goolagong	(West Germany) Helga Masthoff (France) Odile de Roubin (Czechoslovakia) Martina Navratilova (West Germany) Katja Ebbinghaus
21 May; 28 May	French Open; Paris, France; Grand Slam (AA); Clay (red) – 64S/45Q/32D/32X; Singles – Doubles – Mixed doubles	(Australia) Margaret Court (United Kingdom) Virginia Wade; 6–2, 6–3	(France) Françoise Dürr (Netherlands) Betty Stöve	(France) Françoise Dürr (Australia) Evonne Goolagong	(West Germany) Helga Masthoff (France) Odile de Roubin (Czechoslovakia) Martina Navratilova (West Germany) Katja Ebbinghaus
21 May; 28 May	French Open; Paris, France; Grand Slam (AA); Clay (red) – 64S/45Q/32D/32X; Singles – Doubles – Mixed doubles	(France) Françoise Dürr (France) Jean-Claude Barclay; 6–1, 6–4	(Netherlands) Betty Stöve (France) Patrice Dominguez	(France) Françoise Dürr (Australia) Evonne Goolagong	(West Germany) Helga Masthoff (France) Odile de Roubin (Czechoslovakia) Martina Navratilova (West Germany) Katja Ebbinghaus

=== June ===
Week	Tournament	Champions	Runners-up	Semifinalists	Quarterfinalists
4 Jun	Italian Open; Rome, Italy; Grand Prix (A); Clay – 48S/24D	(Australia) Evonne Goolagong; 7–6^{(8–6)}, 6–0	(United States) Chris Evert	(Czechoslovakia) Vlasta Vopičková (West Germany) Helga Niessen Masthoff	(Czechoslovakia) Renáta Tomanová (United States) Kristien Kemmer (United States) Linda Tuero (West Germany) Katja Ebbinghaus
4 Jun	Italian Open; Rome, Italy; Grand Prix (A); Clay – 48S/24D	(Soviet Union) Olga Morozova (United Kingdom) Virginia Wade; 3–6, 6–2, 7–5	(Czechoslovakia) Martina Navratilova (Czechoslovakia) Renáta Tomanová	(Czechoslovakia) Vlasta Vopičková (West Germany) Helga Niessen Masthoff	(Czechoslovakia) Renáta Tomanová (United States) Kristien Kemmer (United States) Linda Tuero (West Germany) Katja Ebbinghaus
4 Jun	Rothmans Championships; Chichester, United Kingdom; Non-tour event Grass	(Australia) Dianne Fromholtz; 6–1, 6–0	(South Africa) Brigitte Cuypers		
4 Jun	Rothmans Championships; Chichester, United Kingdom; Non-tour event Grass	(United States) Julie Heldman (United States) Ann Kiyomura; 7–5, 6–3	(United Kingdom) Jackie Fayter (United States) Peggy Michel		
11 Jun	German Open; Hamburg, West Germany; Grand Prix (B); Clay – 32S/16D	(West Germany) Helga Niessen Masthoff; 6–4, 6–1	(South Africa) Pat Pretorius	(Japan) Kazuko Sawamatsu (Netherlands) Marijke Schaar	(Socialist Federal Republic of Yugoslavia) Mima Jaušovec (Uruguay) Fiorella Bonicelli (United States) Kristien Kemmer (Czechoslovakia) Renáta Tomanová
11 Jun	German Open; Hamburg, West Germany; Grand Prix (B); Clay – 32S/16D	(West Germany) Helga Niessen Masthoff (West Germany) Heide Orth; 6–1, 6–2	(United States) Kristien Kemmer (South Africa) Laura Rossouw	(Japan) Kazuko Sawamatsu (Netherlands) Marijke Schaar	(Socialist Federal Republic of Yugoslavia) Mima Jaušovec (Uruguay) Fiorella Bonicelli (United States) Kristien Kemmer (Czechoslovakia) Renáta Tomanová
11 Jun	John Player Open; Nottingham, Great Britain; Grand Prix (B); Grass – 32S/16D	(United States) Billie Jean King; 8–6, 6–4	(United Kingdom) Virginia Wade	(United States) Rosemary Casals (United States) Chris Evert	(Indonesia) Lany Kaligis (United States) Patti Hogan (United States) Pam Teeguarden (United Kingdom) Glynis Coles
11 Jun	John Player Open; Nottingham, Great Britain; Grand Prix (B); Grass – 32S/16D	(United States) Rosemary Casals (United States) Billie Jean King; 6–2, 9–7	(United States) Chris Evert (Netherlands) Betty Stöve	(United States) Rosemary Casals (United States) Chris Evert	(Indonesia) Lany Kaligis (United States) Patti Hogan (United States) Pam Teeguarden (United Kingdom) Glynis Coles
11 Jun	Green Shield Kent Championships; Beckenham, United Kingdom; Non-tour event Grass; Draw	(Australia) Dianne Fromholtz; 7–5, 0–6, 6–1	(United States) Janet Newberry		
11 Jun	Green Shield Kent Championships; Beckenham, United Kingdom; Non-tour event Grass; Draw	(Soviet Union) Marina Kroschina (Soviet Union) Olga Morozova; 8–6, 6–3	(United Kingdom) Jackie Fayter (United States) Peggy Michel		
18 Jun	Rothmans Championships; London, Great Britain; Grand Prix (C); Grass – ?S/?D	(Soviet Union) Olga Morozova; 6–2, 6–3	(Australia) Evonne Goolagong	(United States) Valerie Ziegenfuss (United States) Julie Heldman	(United States) Kristien Kemmer (United States) Marita Redondo (Australia) Kerry Melville (United States) Chris Evert
18 Jun	Rothmans Championships; London, Great Britain; Grand Prix (C); Grass – ?S/?D	(United States) Rosie Casals (United States) Billie Jean King; 4–6, 6–3, 7–5	(France) Françoise Dürr (Netherlands) Betty Stöve	(United States) Valerie Ziegenfuss (United States) Julie Heldman	(United States) Kristien Kemmer (United States) Marita Redondo (Australia) Kerry Melville (United States) Chris Evert
25 Jun; 2 Jul	Wimbledon Championships; London, Great Britain; Grand Slam (AA); Grass – 96S/50D/80X; Singles – Doubles – Mixed doubles	(United States) Billie Jean King; 6–0, 7–5	(United States) Chris Evert	(Australia) Margaret Court (Australia) Evonne Goolagong	(Soviet Union) Olga Morozova (United States) Rosie Casals (United Kingdom) Virginia Wade (Australia) Kerry Melville
25 Jun; 2 Jul	Wimbledon Championships; London, Great Britain; Grand Slam (AA); Grass – 96S/50D/80X; Singles – Doubles – Mixed doubles	(United States) Rosie Casals (United States) Billie Jean King; 6–1, 4–6, 7–5	(France) Françoise Dürr (Netherlands) Betty Stöve	(Australia) Margaret Court (Australia) Evonne Goolagong	(Soviet Union) Olga Morozova (United States) Rosie Casals (United Kingdom) Virginia Wade (Australia) Kerry Melville
25 Jun; 2 Jul	Wimbledon Championships; London, Great Britain; Grand Slam (AA); Grass – 96S/50D/80X; Singles – Doubles – Mixed doubles	(United States) Billie Jean King (Australia) Owen Davidson; 6–3, 6–2	(United States) Janet Newberry (Mexico) Raúl Ramírez	(Australia) Margaret Court (Australia) Evonne Goolagong	(Soviet Union) Olga Morozova (United States) Rosie Casals (United Kingdom) Virginia Wade (Australia) Kerry Melville

=== July ===
Week	Tournament	Champions	Runners-up	Semifinalists	Quarterfinalists
9 Jul	Düsseldorf Open; Düsseldorf, West Germany; Grand Prix (A); Clay – 26S/13D	(West Germany) Helga Niessen Masthoff; 6–4, 6–4	(Australia) Evonne Goolagong	(West Germany) Katja Ebbinghaus (Japan) Kazuko Sawamatsu	(Colombia) Isabel Fernández de Soto (Netherlands) Betty Stöve (South Africa) Pat Pretorius (United States) Pam Teeguarden
9 Jul	Düsseldorf Open; Düsseldorf, West Germany; Grand Prix (A); Clay – 26S/13D	(Australia) Evonne Goolagong / (Australia) Janet Young vs (West Germany) Helga Niessen Masthoff / (West Germany) Heide Orth; Title Shared		(West Germany) Katja Ebbinghaus (Japan) Kazuko Sawamatsu	(Colombia) Isabel Fernández de Soto (Netherlands) Betty Stöve (South Africa) Pat Pretorius (United States) Pam Teeguarden
9 Jul	Carrolls Irish Open; Dublin, Ireland; Grand Prix (B); Grass – 32S/16D	(Australia) Margaret Court; 6–2, 6–4	(United Kingdom) Virginia Wade	(Australia) Helen Gourlay (Australia) Patricia Coleman	(Republic of Ireland) Geraldine Barniville (United Kingdom) Veronica Burton (Australia) Karen Krantzcke (Australia) Wendy Turnbull
9 Jul	Carrolls Irish Open; Dublin, Ireland; Grand Prix (B); Grass – 32S/16D	(Australia) Margaret Court (United Kingdom) Virginia Wade; 8–6, 3–6, 6–4	(Australia) Helen Gourlay (Australia) Karen Krantzcke	(Australia) Helen Gourlay (Australia) Patricia Coleman	(Republic of Ireland) Geraldine Barniville (United Kingdom) Veronica Burton (Australia) Karen Krantzcke (Australia) Wendy Turnbull
9 Jul	Green Shield Welsh Championships; Newport, United States; Non-tour event Grass	(United States) Julie Heldman; 1–6, 6–1, 11–9	(Australia) Dianne Fromholtz		
9 Jul	Green Shield Welsh Championships; Newport, United States; Non-tour event Grass	(United States) Patti Hogan / (United States) Sharon Walsh vs (Australia) Dianne Fromholtz / (United States) Julie Heldman; Title Shared			
16 Jul	Rothmans North of England Championships; Hoylake, Great Britain; Grand Prix (C) ?S/?D	(United States) Patti Hogan; 11–9, 4–6, 6–4	(United States) Sharon Walsh	(United Kingdom) Virginia Wade (Australia) Karen Krantzcke	(Australia) Wendy Turnbull (United Kingdom) Veronica Burton (Australia) Dianne Fromholtz (United Kingdom) Lindsay Blachford
16 Jul	Rothmans North of England Championships; Hoylake, Great Britain; Grand Prix (C) ?S/?D	(Australia) Karen Krantzcke (United Kingdom) Virginia Wade; 5–7, 6–4, 6–1	(United States) Patti Hogan (United States) Sharon Walsh	(United Kingdom) Virginia Wade (Australia) Karen Krantzcke	(Australia) Wendy Turnbull (United Kingdom) Veronica Burton (Australia) Dianne Fromholtz (United Kingdom) Lindsay Blachford
16 Jul	Austrian Open; Kitzbühel, Austria; Non-tour event Clay	(Australia) Evonne Goolagong vs (Soviet Union) Olga Morozova; Cancelled due to rain			
23 Jul	Marie O. Clarke Memorial; Cleveland, United States; Grand Prix (B); 8S/4D	(United States) Chris Evert; 6–0, 6–0	(United States) Linda Tuero	(United States) Janice Metcalf (France) Nathalie Fuchs	(United States) Patricia Bostrom (South Africa) Pat Pretorius (Australia) Marilyn Tesch (Republic of Ireland) Susan Minford
23 Jul	Marie O. Clarke Memorial; Cleveland, United States; Grand Prix (B); 8S/4D	(South Africa) Ilana Kloss (South Africa) Pat Pretorius; 1–6, 7–6, 6–1	(United States) Janice Metcalf (United States) Laurie Tenney	(United States) Janice Metcalf (France) Nathalie Fuchs	(United States) Patricia Bostrom (South Africa) Pat Pretorius (Australia) Marilyn Tesch (Republic of Ireland) Susan Minford
30 Jul	Atlantic City Open; Atlantic City, United States; Grand Prix (B); 32S/16D	(United States) Chris Evert; 6–2, 7–5	(United States) Marita Redondo	(United States) Laurie Tenney (South Africa) Pat Pretorius	(Belgium) Michele Gurdal (United States) Sharon Walsh (France) Nathalie Fuchs (United States) Kate Latham
30 Jul	Atlantic City Open; Atlantic City, United States; Grand Prix (B); 32S/16D	(United States) Chris Evert (United States) Marita Redondo; 6–4, 6–4	(South Africa) Ilana Kloss (South Africa) Pat Pretorius	(United States) Laurie Tenney (South Africa) Pat Pretorius	(Belgium) Michele Gurdal (United States) Sharon Walsh (France) Nathalie Fuchs (United States) Kate Latham
30 Jul	Virginia Slims of Denver; Denver, United States; Virginia Slims; Hard – $30,000 – 32S/16D	(United States) Billie Jean King; 6–4, 6–2	(Netherlands) Betty Stöve	3rd: (United States) Julie Heldman; 4th: (United States) Janet Newberry	(Australia) Karen Krantzcke (United States) Pam Teeguarden (United States) Barbara Downs (United States) Rosie Casals
30 Jul	Virginia Slims of Denver; Denver, United States; Virginia Slims; Hard – $30,000 – 32S/16D	(United States) Rosie Casals & (United States) Billie Jean King vs (France) Françoise Dürr & (Netherlands) Betty Stöve; 3–2 suspended		3rd: (United States) Julie Heldman; 4th: (United States) Janet Newberry	(Australia) Karen Krantzcke (United States) Pam Teeguarden (United States) Barbara Downs (United States) Rosie Casals

=== August ===
Week	Tournament	Champions	Runners-up	Semifinalists	Quarterfinalists
6 Aug	Commerce Union Classic; Nashville, United States; Virginia Slims $30,000	(Australia) Margaret Court; 6–3, 4–6, 6–2	(United States) Billie Jean King	(United States) Rosie Casals (France) Françoise Dürr	(United States) Kathy Kuykendall (United States) Mona Schallau (United States) Janet Newberry (Netherlands) Betty Stöve
6 Aug	Commerce Union Classic; Nashville, United States; Virginia Slims $30,000	(France) Françoise Dürr (Netherlands) Betty Stöve; 6–4, 6–7, 6–1	(Australia) Karen Krantzcke (United States) Janet Newberry	(United States) Rosie Casals (France) Françoise Dürr	(United States) Kathy Kuykendall (United States) Mona Schallau (United States) Janet Newberry (Netherlands) Betty Stöve
6 Aug	Western Championships; Cincinnati, United States; Grand Prix (B); Clay – 32S/16D	(Australia) Evonne Goolagong; 6–2, 7–5	(United States) Chris Evert	(United States) Jeanne Evert (South Africa) Ilana Kloss	(South Africa) Pat Pretorius (United States) Sharon Walsh (United States) Ann Kiyomura (Colombia) Isabel Fernández de Soto
6 Aug	Western Championships; Cincinnati, United States; Grand Prix (B); Clay – 32S/16D	(South Africa) Ilana Kloss (South Africa) Pat Pretorius; 7–6, 3–6, 6–2	(Australia) Evonne Goolagong (Australia) Janet Young	(United States) Jeanne Evert (South Africa) Ilana Kloss	(South Africa) Pat Pretorius (United States) Sharon Walsh (United States) Ann Kiyomura (Colombia) Isabel Fernández de Soto
13 Aug	Jersey Shore Classic; Jersey Shore, United States; Virginia Slims $30,000	(Australia) Margaret Court; 4–6, 6–2, 6–3	(Australia) Lesley Hunt	(United States) Rosie Casals (Australia) Karen Krantzcke	(Australia) Kerry Harris (United States) Janet Newberry (United States) Tory Fretz (United States) Joy Schwikert
13 Aug	Jersey Shore Classic; Jersey Shore, United States; Virginia Slims $30,000	(France) Françoise Dürr (Netherlands) Betty Stöve; 6–4, 6–4	(United States) Julie Anthony (United States) Mona Schallau	(United States) Rosie Casals (Australia) Karen Krantzcke	(Australia) Kerry Harris (United States) Janet Newberry (United States) Tory Fretz (United States) Joy Schwikert
13 Aug	U.S. Clay Court Championships; Indianapolis, United States; Grand Prix (B); Clay – 32S/16D	(United States) Chris Evert; 6–4, 6–3	(United Kingdom) Veronica Burton	(United States) Linda Tuero (United Kingdom) Lindsey Beaven	(South Africa) Pat Pretorius (South Africa) Ilana Kloss (United States) Jeanne Evert (United States) Janet Haas
13 Aug	U.S. Clay Court Championships; Indianapolis, United States; Grand Prix (B); Clay – 32S/16D	(United States) Patti Hogan (United States) Sharon Walsh; 6–4, 6–4	(Uruguay) Fiorella Bonicelli (Colombia) Isabel Fernández de Soto	(United States) Linda Tuero (United Kingdom) Lindsey Beaven	(South Africa) Pat Pretorius (South Africa) Ilana Kloss (United States) Jeanne Evert (United States) Janet Haas
20 Aug	Virginia Slims Grass Court Championships; Newport, United States; Virginia Slims $30,000	(Australia) Margaret Court; 6–3, 6–2	(United States) Julie Heldman	3rd: (Australia) Kerry Melville; 4th: (United States) Kristien Kemmer	(Australia) Lesley Hunt (Netherlands) Betty Stöve (United States) Rosie Casals (France) Françoise Dürr
20 Aug	Virginia Slims Grass Court Championships; Newport, United States; Virginia Slims $30,000	(France) Françoise Dürr (Netherlands) Betty Stöve; 6–4, 6–3	(United States) Janet Newberry (United States) Pam Teeguarden	3rd: (Australia) Kerry Melville; 4th: (United States) Kristien Kemmer	(Australia) Lesley Hunt (Netherlands) Betty Stöve (United States) Rosie Casals (France) Françoise Dürr
20 Aug	Canadian Open; Toronto, Canada; Grand Prix (C); Clay – ?S/?D	(Australia) Evonne Goolagong; 7–6^{(7–2)}, 6–4	(West Germany) Helga Niessen Masthoff	(United States) Peggy Michel (Czechoslovakia) Martina Navratilova	(Australia) Marilyn Tesch (France) Nathalie Fuchs (Canada) Susan Stone (Canada) Janice Tindle
20 Aug	Canadian Open; Toronto, Canada; Grand Prix (C); Clay – ?S/?D	(Australia) Evonne Goolagong (United States) Peggy Michel; 6–3, 6–2	(West Germany) Helga Niessen Masthoff (Czechoslovakia) Martina Navratilova	(United States) Peggy Michel (Czechoslovakia) Martina Navratilova	(Australia) Marilyn Tesch (France) Nathalie Fuchs (Canada) Susan Stone (Canada) Janice Tindle
27 Aug; 3 Sep	US Open; New York City, United States; Grand Slam (AA); Grass – 64S/32D/32X; Singles – Doubles – Mixed doubles	(Australia) Margaret Court; 7–6, 5–7, 6–2	(Australia) Evonne Goolagong	(West Germany) Helga Masthoff (United States) Chris Evert	(United States) Julie Heldman (Australia) Kerry Melville (United States) Rosie Casals (United Kingdom) Virginia Wade
27 Aug; 3 Sep	US Open; New York City, United States; Grand Slam (AA); Grass – 64S/32D/32X; Singles – Doubles – Mixed doubles	(Australia) Margaret Court (United Kingdom) Virginia Wade; 3–6, 6–3, 7–5	(United States) Rosie Casals (United States) Billie Jean King	(West Germany) Helga Masthoff (United States) Chris Evert	(United States) Julie Heldman (Australia) Kerry Melville (United States) Rosie Casals (United Kingdom) Virginia Wade
27 Aug; 3 Sep	US Open; New York City, United States; Grand Slam (AA); Grass – 64S/32D/32X; Singles – Doubles – Mixed doubles	(United States) Billie Jean King (Australia) Owen Davidson; 6–3, 3–6, 7–6	(Australia) Margaret Court (United States) Marty Riessen	(West Germany) Helga Masthoff (United States) Chris Evert	(United States) Julie Heldman (Australia) Kerry Melville (United States) Rosie Casals (United Kingdom) Virginia Wade

=== September ===
Week	Tournament	Champions	Runners-up	Semifinalists	Quarterfinalists
10 Sep	Virginia Slims of St. Louis; St. Louis, United States; Virginia Slims; Hard – $30,000	(United States) Rosie Casals; 6–4, 6–7, 6–0	(Australia) Karen Krantzcke	(United States) Pam Teeguarden (Australia) Kerry Melville	(United States) Kristien Kemmer (Netherlands) Betty Stöve (United States) Mary Ann Beattie (Australia) Kerry Harris
10 Sep	Virginia Slims of St. Louis; St. Louis, United States; Virginia Slims; Hard – $30,000	(Australia) Karen Krantzcke (United States) Mona Schallau; 6–4, 7–6	(Netherlands) Betty Stöve (United States) Pam Teeguarden	(United States) Pam Teeguarden (Australia) Kerry Melville	(United States) Kristien Kemmer (Netherlands) Betty Stöve (United States) Mary Ann Beattie (Australia) Kerry Harris
10 Sep	Four Roses Classic; Charlotte, United States; Grand Prix (A); 30S/16D	(Australia) Evonne Goolagong; 6–2, 6–0	(Soviet Union) Eugenia Birioukova	(Japan) Kazuko Sawamatsu (Czechoslovakia) Martina Navratilova	(United Kingdom) Veronica Burton (United Kingdom) Jackie Fayter (Soviet Union) Olga Morozova (Soviet Union) Marina Kroschina
10 Sep	Four Roses Classic; Charlotte, United States; Grand Prix (A); 30S/16D	(Australia) Evonne Goolagong (Australia) Janet Young; 6–2, 6–0	(South Africa) Ilana Kloss (Czechoslovakia) Martina Navratilova	(Japan) Kazuko Sawamatsu (Czechoslovakia) Martina Navratilova	(United Kingdom) Veronica Burton (United Kingdom) Jackie Fayter (Soviet Union) Olga Morozova (Soviet Union) Marina Kroschina
10 Sep	World Invitational Sea Pines; Hilton Head Island, United States; Non-tour event Carpet	(Australia) Margaret Court; Walkover	(United States) Chris Evert		
17 Sep	Virginia Slims of Houston; Houston, United States; Virginia Slims; Carpet (i) – $30,000	(France) Françoise Dürr; 6–4, 1–6, 6–4	(United States) Rosie Casals	3rd/4th: (United States) Nancy Gunter (United States) Billie Jean King shared, match abandoned.	(United States) Robin Tenney (United States) Tory Fretz (United States) Julie Heldman (Australia) Kerry Melville
17 Sep	Virginia Slims of Houston; Houston, United States; Virginia Slims; Carpet (i) – $30,000	(United States) Mona Schallau (United States) Pam Teeguarden; 6–3, 5–7, 6–4	(France) Françoise Dürr (Netherlands) Betty Stöve	3rd/4th: (United States) Nancy Gunter (United States) Billie Jean King shared, match abandoned.	(United States) Robin Tenney (United States) Tory Fretz (United States) Julie Heldman (Australia) Kerry Melville
24 Sep	Virginia Slims of Columbus; Columbus, United States; Virginia Slims; Hard – $30,000 – 32S/16D	(United States) Chris Evert; Walkover	(Australia) Margaret Court	(United States) Julie Heldman (United States) Rosie Casals	(United States) Kathy Kuykendall (Netherlands) Betty Stöve (Australia) Lesley Hunt (United States) Laurie Fleming
24 Sep	Virginia Slims of Columbus; Columbus, United States; Virginia Slims; Hard – $30,000 – 32S/16D	(France) Françoise Dürr (Netherlands) Betty Stöve; 7–5, 7–5	(United States) Mona Schallau (United States) Pam Teeguarden	(United States) Julie Heldman (United States) Rosie Casals	(United States) Kathy Kuykendall (Netherlands) Betty Stöve (Australia) Lesley Hunt (United States) Laurie Fleming

=== October ===
Week	Tournament	Champions	Runners-up	Semifinalists	Quarterfinalists
1 Oct	Virginia Slims of Phoenix; Phoenix, United States; Virginia Slims $40,000	(United States) Billie Jean King; 6–1, 6–3	(United States) Nancy Gunter	3rd: (Australia) Kerry Melville; 4th: (United States) Rosie Casals	(Netherlands) Betty Stöve (United States) Julie Heldman (France) Françoise Dürr (United States) Kristien Kemmer
1 Oct	Virginia Slims of Phoenix; Phoenix, United States; Virginia Slims $40,000	(Australia) Kerry Harris (Australia) Kerry Melville; 6–4, 6–4	(United States) Rosie Casals (United States) Billie Jean King	3rd: (Australia) Kerry Melville; 4th: (United States) Rosie Casals	(Netherlands) Betty Stöve (United States) Julie Heldman (France) Françoise Dürr (United States) Kristien Kemmer
15 Oct	Virginia Slims Championships; Boca Raton, United States; Year-end championships Clay – $100,000 – 8S/16D; Singles	(United States) Chris Evert; 6–3, 6–3	(United States) Nancy Gunter	(France) Françoise Dürr (Australia) Kerry Melville	(United States) Janet Newberry (United Kingdom) Virginia Wade (United States) Mona Schallau (United States) Julie Heldman
15 Oct	Virginia Slims Championships; Boca Raton, United States; Year-end championships Clay – $100,000 – 8S/16D; Singles	(United States) Rosie Casals (Australia) Margaret Court; 6–2, 6–4	(France) Françoise Dürr (Netherlands) Betty Stöve	(France) Françoise Dürr (Australia) Kerry Melville	(United States) Janet Newberry (United Kingdom) Virginia Wade (United States) Mona Schallau (United States) Julie Heldman
22 Oct	Virginia Slims of Hawaii; Honolulu, United States; Virginia Slims $30,000	(United States) Billie Jean King; 6–1, 6–1	(Australia) Helen Gourlay	(United States) Marcie Louie (Australia) Kerry Melville	(United States) Patricia Bostrom (Australia) Karen Krantzcke (United States) Wendy Appleby (Australia) Kerry Harris
22 Oct	Virginia Slims of Hawaii; Honolulu, United States; Virginia Slims $30,000	(Australia) Kerry Harris (Australia) Kerry Melville; 6–3, 3–6, 6–3	(Australia) Helen Gourlay (Australia) Karen Krantzcke	(United States) Marcie Louie (Australia) Kerry Melville	(United States) Patricia Bostrom (Australia) Karen Krantzcke (United States) Wendy Appleby (Australia) Kerry Harris
22 Oct	Dewar Circuit; Aberavon, United Kingdom; Non-tour event Clay	(United Kingdom) Virginia Wade; 6–3, 6–1	(United States) Julie Heldman		
22 Oct	Dewar Circuit; Aberavon, United Kingdom; Non-tour event Clay	(United States) Marita Redondo (United Kingdom) Virginia Wade; 4–6, 6–3, 7–6	(United States) Julie Heldman (United States) Ann Kiyomura		
29 Oct	Dewar Circuit; Edinburgh, United Kingdom; Non-tour event Clay	(United Kingdom) Virginia Wade; 6–4, 3–6, 6–1	(United States) Julie Heldman		
29 Oct	Dewar Circuit; Edinburgh, United Kingdom; Non-tour event Clay	(United States) Marita Redondo (United Kingdom) Virginia Wade; 6–1, 2–6, 6–4	(United States) Julie Heldman (United States) Ann Kiyomura		

=== November ===
Week	Tournament	Champions	Runners-up	Semifinalists	Quarterfinalists
5 Nov	Dewar Circuit; Billingham, United Kingdom; Non-tour event Clay	(United Kingdom) Virginia Wade; 6–2, 6–0	(France) Nathalie Fuchs		
5 Nov	Dewar Circuit; Billingham, United Kingdom; Non-tour event Clay	(United States) Marita Redondo (United Kingdom) Virginia Wade; 6–7, 6–3, 6–2	(United Kingdom) Glynis Coles (United States) Sharon Walsh		
12 Nov	Dewar Circuit Final; London, United Kingdom; Non-tour event Clay	(United Kingdom) Virginia Wade; 6–2, 3–6, 7–5	(United States) Julie Heldman		
12 Nov	Fred Perry Japan Open; Tokyo, Japan; Non-tour event Carpet (i)	(Australia) Evonne Goolagong; 6–3, 6–4	(West Germany) Helga Niessen Masthoff		
19 Nov	South African Championships; Johannesburg, South Africa; Grand Prix (A); Hard – 60S/30D/16XD	(United States) Chris Evert; 6–3, 6–3	(Australia) Evonne Goolagong	(United States) Kristien Kemmer (United Kingdom) Virginia Wade	(South Africa) Linky Boshoff (South Africa) Pat Pretorius (United States) Julie Anthony (South Africa) Ilana Kloss
19 Nov	South African Championships; Johannesburg, South Africa; Grand Prix (A); Hard – 60S/30D/16XD	(South Africa) Linky Boshoff (South Africa) Ilana Kloss; 7–6, 2–6, 6–1	(United States) Chris Evert (United Kingdom) Virginia Wade	(United States) Kristien Kemmer (United Kingdom) Virginia Wade	(South Africa) Linky Boshoff (South Africa) Pat Pretorius (United States) Julie Anthony (South Africa) Ilana Kloss
19 Nov	South African Championships; Johannesburg, South Africa; Grand Prix (A); Hard – 60S/30D/16XD	(Australia) Evonne Goolagong (West Germany) Jürgen Fassbender; 6–3, 6–2	(South Africa) Ilana Kloss (South Africa) Bernard Mitton	(United States) Kristien Kemmer (United Kingdom) Virginia Wade	(South Africa) Linky Boshoff (South Africa) Pat Pretorius (United States) Julie Anthony (South Africa) Ilana Kloss
19 Nov	Tokyo Gunze Classic; Tokyo, Japan; Non-tour event Carpet (i)	(United States) Billie Jean King; 6–4, 6–4	(United States) Nancy Richey		

== Grand Prix points system ==
The Grand Prix tournaments were divided into four groups. Group AA consisted of the Triple Crown – the French Open, the Wimbledon Championships and the US Open – while the other tournaments were divided into Groups A, B and C by prize money and draw size. Points were allocated based on these groups and the finishing position of a player in a tournament. No points were awarded to first round losers and ties were settled by the number of tournaments played. The points allocation is listed below:

Group AA
- Champion: 100
- Runner-up: 75
- Semifinalist: 50
- Quarterfinalist: 25
- Fourth round: 12
- Third round: 6
- Second round: 3

Group A
- Champion: 60
- Runner-up: 40
- Semifinalist: 30
- Quarterfinalist: 15
- 9th – 16th: 7
- 17th – 32nd: 3
- 33rd – 64th: 1

Group B
- Champion: 40
- Runner-up: 30
- Semifinalist: 20
- 5th – 8th: 10
- 9th – 16th: 5
- 17th – 32nd: 2

Group C
- Champion: 20
- Runner-up: 15
- Semifinalist: 10
- 5th – 8th: 5
- 9th – 16th: 3
- 17th – 32nd: 1

== Statistical information ==
These tables present the number of singles (S), doubles (D), and mixed doubles (X) titles won by each player and each nation during the 1973 Virginia Slims Circuit. They also include data for the Grand Slam tournaments and the year-end championships. The table is sorted by:

1. total number of titles (a doubles title won by two players representing the same nation counts as only one win for the nation);
2. highest amount of highest category tournaments (for example, having a single Grand Slam gives preference over any kind of combination without a Grand Slam title);
3. a singles > doubles > mixed doubles hierarchy;
4. alphabetical order (by family names for players).

=== Key ===
Grand Slam tournaments
Year-end championships
Virginia Slims event

=== Titles won by player ===
Total	Player	S	D	X	S	D	S	D	S	D	X
23	Margaret Court (AUS)	● ● ●	● ● ●			●	● ● ● ● ● ● ● ● ● ● ● ● ●	● ● ●	16	7	0
13	Billie Jean King (USA)	●	●	● ●			● ● ● ●	● ● ● ● ●	5	6	2
10	Rosie Casals (USA)		●			●	● ●	● ● ● ● ● ● ●	2	8	0
8	Françoise Durr (FRA)			●			●	● ● ● ● ● ●	1	6	1
6	Betty Stöve (NED)							● ● ● ● ● ●	0	6	0
3	Virginia Wade (GBR)		● ● ●						0	3	0
3	Kerry Melville (AUS)						●	● ●	1	2	0
3	Lesley Hunt (AUS)							● ● ●	0	3	0
2	Chris Evert (USA)				●		●		2	0	0
2	Kerry Harris (AUS)							● ●	0	2	0
2	Julie Heldman (USA)							● ●	0	2	0
2	Mona Schallau (USA)							● ●	0	2	0
2	Pam Teeguarden (USA)							● ●	0	2	0
1	Karen Krantzcke (AUS)							●	0	1	0
1	Janet Newberry (USA)							●	0	1	0

=== Titles won by nation ===
Total	Nation	S	D	X	S	D	S	D	S	D	X
27	Australia (AUS)	3	3	0	0	1	14	6	17	10	0
23	United States (USA)	1	1	2	1	1	7	10	9	12	2
8	France (FRA)	0	0	1	0	0	1	6	1	6	1
6	Netherlands (NED)	0	0	0	0	0	0	6	0	6	0
3	Great Britain (GBR)	0	3	0	0	0	0	0	0	3	0

== See also ==
- 1973 World Championship Tennis circuit
- 1973 Grand Prix tennis circuit
