= 1972 ILTF Women's Tennis Circuit =

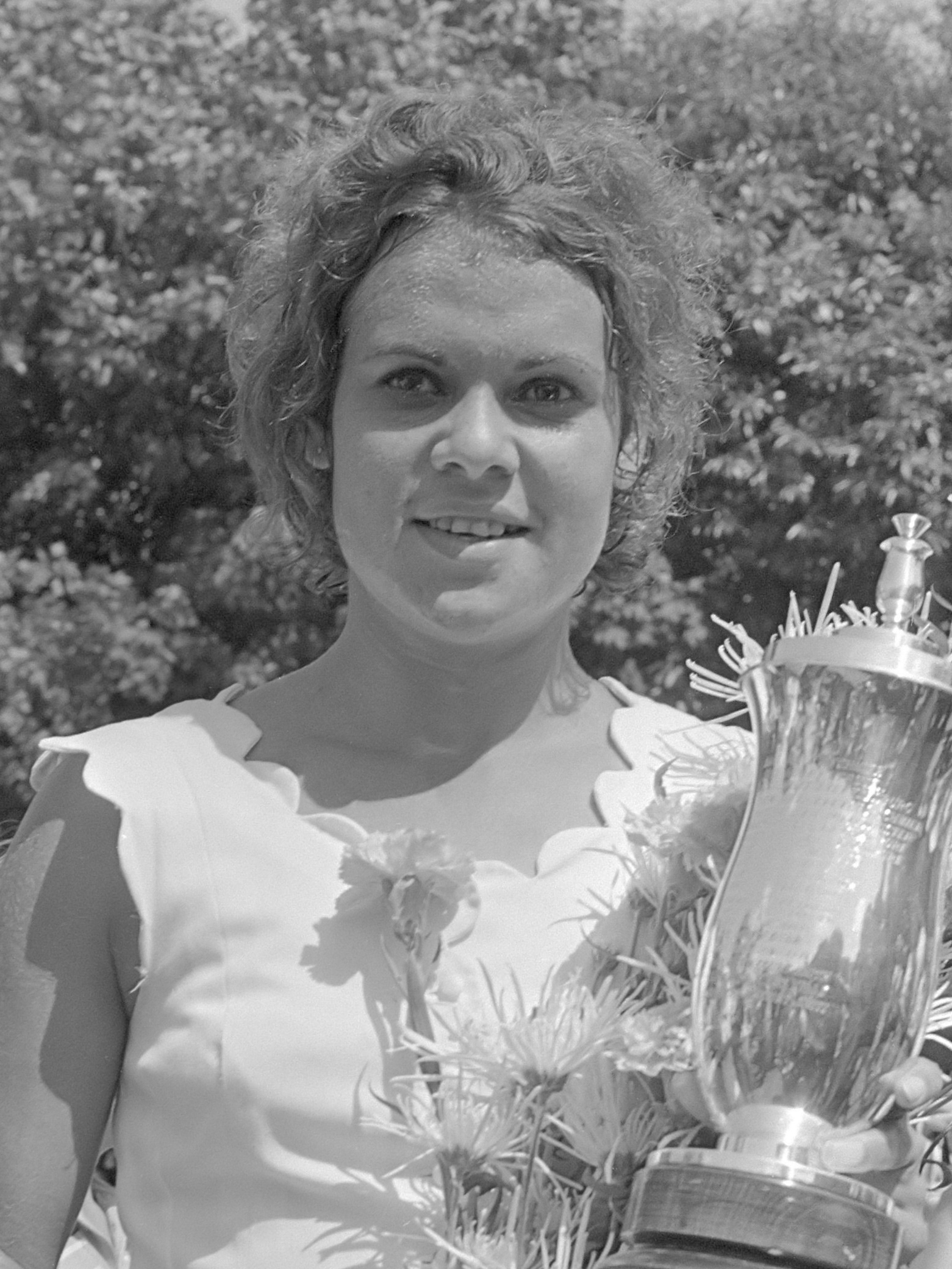
- Evonne Goolagong won 12 singles titles during the season.

Details
- Duration: 26 December 1971–18 December 1972
- Edition: 58th
- Tournaments: 161
- Categories: Grand Slam (4); Year-end championships (1); Virginia Slims Circuit (20); ILTF Women's Grand Prix (11); ILTF World Circuit (125)

Achievements (singles)
- Most titles: (Australia) Evonne Goolagong (12)
- Most finals: (Australia) Evonne Goolagong (20)

The 1972 ILTF Women's Tennis Circuit was the 58th season since the founding of the International Lawn Tennis Association and was the final season to be solely administered by the ILTF.

It was composed of the 2nd annual Virginia Slims Circuit with 20 events, a tour of tennis tournaments for female tennis players, sponsored by Virginia Slims cigarettes, but approved by the ILTF and the 2nd annual ILTF Commercial Union Women's Grand Prix circuit with 13 events which included Roland Garros and Wimbledon, and sponsored by Commercial Union insurance company and the 58th annual ILTF World Circuit with 125 events.

The following season would see the formation of the Women's Tennis Association in which the ILTF would eventually have to share responsibility for administering the worldwide tour for women something at this time it was resisting to change. In 1973 the majority of the ILTF events remain under direct administration of that organisation and continues with and independent ILTF World Circuit that offered lower prize money and ranking points of the other two circuits.

== Composition ==
=== ILTF Women's Grand Prix Circuit ===
The 1972 ILTF Women's Grand Prix Circuit.was a tennis circuit administered by the International Lawn Tennis Federation which served as a forerunner to the current Association of Tennis Professionals (ATP) World Tour and the Women's Tennis Association (WTA) Tour. The circuit consisted of two of the four modern Grand Slam tournaments including Roland Garros, Wimbledon and open tournaments recognised by the ILTF. That circuit ran from 27 March to 4 September. Evonne Goolagong won most events on this circuit with 5 titles.

=== Virginia Slims Circuit ===
Prior to the establishment of this circuit there was an inequality between the prize money purses for male and female tennis players which gave rise to complaints from a number of the leading female tennis players of the time. Nine of them, including Billie Jean King, became later known as the "Original 9" after being banned from the then existing multi-gender invitational professional events run by the influential United States Lawn Tennis Association (USLTA) due to their boycotting of the Pacific Southwest Championships. This resulted in the first Virginia Slims-sponsored event being held in September 1970 in Houston, an event which laid the groundwork for the establishment of the annual Virginia Slims Circuit the following year. The 1972 Virginia Slims Circuit consisted on 22 tournaments including the U.S. Open the circuit began on 12 January and ended on 11 October and offered $587,775 in prize money. Billie Jean King won most events on this circuit with 7 titles of her 11 titles in total she played on all three circuits and won events across all three.

=== ILTF World Circuit ===
The 1972 ILTF World Circuit tournaments consisted of 125 events, including the Australian Open that were not part of the sponsored Virginia Slims and Commercial Union Grand Prix circuits. It began 27 December 1971 with the Eastern Province Championships in Port Elizabeth, South Africa and ended on 25 December 1972 with Border Championships, East London, South Africa This years singles title leader Evonne Goolagong won 5 tournaments on this circuit her total 12 tournament wins were across two circuits, this one and the Grand Prix.

== Schedule ==
This is an incomplete calendar of all events that formed the majority of the ILTF World Circuit and the Commercial Union Assurance Company and Virginia Slims sponsored tennis circuits in the year 1972, with player progression documented from the quarterfinals stage. The table also includes the Grand Slam tournaments, the 1972 Virginia Slims Championships and the 1972 Federation Cup.

Key

Grand Slam tournaments
Virginia Slims championships
Virginia Slims Circuit
ILTF Commercial Union Grand Prix
ILTF World Circuit
Team events

=== December (1971) ===
Week	Tournament	Champions	Runners-up	Semifinalists	Quarterfinalists
27 Dec	Australian Open; Melbourne, Australia; Grand Slam; Grass – 64S/32D; Singles – Doubles	(United Kingdom) Virginia Wade; 6–4, 6–4	(Australia) Evonne Goolagong	(Australia) Helen Gourlay (Australia) Kerry Harris	(Australia) Barbara Hawcroft (Soviet Union) Olga Morozova (France) Gail Chanfreau (Australia) Patricia Coleman
27 Dec	Australian Open; Melbourne, Australia; Grand Slam; Grass – 64S/32D; Singles – Doubles	(Australia) Helen Gourlay (Australia) Kerry Harris; 6–0, 6–4	(Australia) Patricia Coleman (Australia) Karen Krantzcke	(Australia) Helen Gourlay (Australia) Kerry Harris	(Australia) Barbara Hawcroft (Soviet Union) Olga Morozova (France) Gail Chanfreau (Australia) Patricia Coleman

=== January ===
Week	Tournament	Champions	Runners-up	Semifinalists	Quarterfinalists
3 Jan	New South Wales Open; Sydney, Australia; ILTF	(Australia) Evonne Goolagong; 6–1, 7–6^{(7–4)}	(United Kingdom) Virginia Wade	(Australia) Patricia Coleman (Australia) Barbara Hawcroft	(Australia) Anne Coleman (Australia) Janet Young (Soviet Union) Olga Morozova (Australia) Marilyn Tesch
3 Jan	New South Wales Open; Sydney, Australia; ILTF	(Australia) Evonne Goolagong (Australia) Patricia Edwards; 6–1, 6–2	(Australia) Lesley Bowrey (United Kingdom) Virginia Wade	(Australia) Patricia Coleman (Australia) Barbara Hawcroft	(Australia) Anne Coleman (Australia) Janet Young (Soviet Union) Olga Morozova (Australia) Marilyn Tesch
10 Jan	British Motor Cars Invitational; San Francisco, United States; Virginia Slims; Carpet (i) – $17,000	(United States) Billie Jean King; 7–6^{(5–0)}, 7–6^{(5–2)}	(Australia) Kerry Melville	(United Kingdom) Virginia Wade (Australia) Judy Dalton	(United States) Nancy Gunter (Australia) Helen Gourlay (France) Françoise Dürr (United States) Rosie Casals
10 Jan	British Motor Cars Invitational; San Francisco, United States; Virginia Slims; Carpet (i) – $17,000	(United States) Rosie Casals (United Kingdom) Virginia Wade; 6–3, 5–7, 6–2	(Australia) Judy Dalton (France) Françoise Dürr	(United Kingdom) Virginia Wade (Australia) Judy Dalton	(United States) Nancy Gunter (Australia) Helen Gourlay (France) Françoise Dürr (United States) Rosie Casals
17 Jan	Indep. Press-Telegram Championships; Long Beach, California, United States; Virginia Slims; Carpet (i) – $17,000	(United States) Rosie Casals; 6–2, 6–7^{(4–5)}, 6–3	(France) Françoise Dürr	(Australia) Kerry Melville (United States) Billie Jean King	(Australia) Helen Gourlay (United States) Julie Heldman (United Kingdom) Virginia Wade (United States) Wendy Overton
17 Jan	Indep. Press-Telegram Championships; Long Beach, California, United States; Virginia Slims; Carpet (i) – $17,000	(United States) Rosie Casals (United Kingdom) Virginia Wade; 6–3, 5–7, 6–2	(Australia) Helen Gourlay (Australia) Karen Krantzcke	(Australia) Kerry Melville (United States) Billie Jean King	(Australia) Helen Gourlay (United States) Julie Heldman (United Kingdom) Virginia Wade (United States) Wendy Overton
17 Jan	South Australian Championships; Adelaide, Australia; ILTF	(Australia) Evonne Goolagong; 7–6^{(7–4)}, 6–3	(Soviet Union) Olga Morozova	(Australia) Janet Young (Australia) Marilyn Tesch	(Australia) Kathy Walker (Australia) Janine Whyte (Australia) Christine Matison (Australia) Barbara Hawcroft
17 Jan	South Australian Championships; Adelaide, Australia; ILTF	(Australia) Evonne Goolagong (Soviet Union) Olga Morozova; 6–3, 6–0	(Australia) Marilyn Tesch (Australia) Kerry Hogarth	(Australia) Janet Young (Australia) Marilyn Tesch	(Australia) Kathy Walker (Australia) Janine Whyte (Australia) Christine Matison (Australia) Barbara Hawcroft
24 Jan	Virginia Slims National Indoors; Boston, United States; Virginia Slims $18,000	(United Kingdom) Virginia Wade; 6–3, 7–5	(France) Françoise Dürr	(United States) Rosie Casals (United States) Wendy Overton	(Australia) Karen Krantzcke (Australia) Judy Dalton (Australia) Lesley Hunt (Australia) Kerry Melville
24 Jan	Virginia Slims National Indoors; Boston, United States; Virginia Slims $18,000	(United States) Rosie Casals (United Kingdom) Virginia Wade; 6–7, 6–0, 7–5	(Australia) Judy Dalton (France) Françoise Dürr	(United States) Rosie Casals (United States) Wendy Overton	(Australia) Karen Krantzcke (Australia) Judy Dalton (Australia) Lesley Hunt (Australia) Kerry Melville
31 Jan	Virginia Slims of Fort Lauderdale; Fort Lauderdale, United States; Virginia Slims $25,000	(United States) Chris Evert; 6–1, 6–0	(United States) Billie Jean King	(United States) Wendy Overton; N/A	(United States) Nancy Gunter; N/A; N/A; N/A
31 Jan	Virginia Slims of Fort Lauderdale; Fort Lauderdale, United States; Virginia Slims $25,000	(Australia) Judy Dalton (France) Françoise Dürr; 6–3, 6–2	(United States) Nancy Gunter (United Kingdom) Virginia Wade	(United States) Wendy Overton; N/A	(United States) Nancy Gunter; N/A; N/A; N/A
31 Jan	Western Australian Championships; Perth, Australia; ILTF	(Australia) Evonne Goolagong; 6–2, 7–5	(Soviet Union) Olga Morozova	(Australia) Patricia Coleman (Australia) Barbara Hawcroft	
31 Jan	Western Australian Championships; Perth, Australia; ILTF	(Australia) Evonne Goolagong (Australia) Barbara Hawcroft; 6–3, 6–0	(Soviet Union) Olga Morozova (Australia) Janet Young	(Australia) Patricia Coleman (Australia) Barbara Hawcroft	

=== February ===
Week	Tournament	Champions	Runners-up	Semifinalists	Quarterfinalists
14 Feb	Virginia Slims of Oklahoma City; Oklahoma City, United States; Virginia Slims $20,000	(United States) Rosie Casals; 6–4, 6–1	(United States) Valerie Ziegenfuss	(Netherlands) Betty Stöve (Australia) Judy Dalton	(United States) Billie Jean King (United States) Wendy Overton (United States) Julie Heldman (France) Françoise Dürr
14 Feb	Virginia Slims of Oklahoma City; Oklahoma City, United States; Virginia Slims $20,000	(United States) Rosie Casals (United States) Billie Jean King; 6–7^{(4–5)}, 7–6^{(5–2)}, 6–2	(Australia) Judy Dalton (France) Françoise Dürr	(Netherlands) Betty Stöve (Australia) Judy Dalton	(United States) Billie Jean King (United States) Wendy Overton (United States) Julie Heldman (France) Françoise Dürr
21 Feb	Virginia Slims of Washington, D.C. Washington, D.C., United States; Virginia Slims $18,000; Singles	(United States) Nancy Gunter; 7–6^{(5–1)}, 6–1	(United States) Chris Evert	(Australia) Kerry Melville (United States) Rosie Casals	(United States) Julie Heldman (France) Françoise Dürr (United States) Barbara Downs (United States) Wendy Overton
21 Feb	Virginia Slims of Washington, D.C. Washington, D.C., United States; Virginia Slims $18,000; Singles	(United States) Wendy Overton (United States) Valerie Ziegenfuss; 7–5, 6–2	(Australia) Judy Dalton (France) Françoise Dürr	(Australia) Kerry Melville (United States) Rosie Casals	(United States) Julie Heldman (France) Françoise Dürr (United States) Barbara Downs (United States) Wendy Overton
28 Feb	K-Mart International; Birmingham, Michigan, United States; Virginia Slims $15,000	(Australia) Kerry Melville; 6–3, 6–7^{(3–5)}, 6–4	(United States) Rosie Casals	(United States) Wendy Overton (Australia) Helen Gourlay	(United States) Julie Heldman (Netherlands) Betty Stöve (United States) Valerie Ziegenfuss (United Kingdom) Corinne Molesworth
28 Feb	K-Mart International; Birmingham, Michigan, United States; Virginia Slims $15,000	(Australia) Judy Dalton (France) Françoise Dürr; 6–1, 6–1	(United States) Rosie Casals (Australia) Kerry Melville	(United States) Wendy Overton (Australia) Helen Gourlay	(United States) Julie Heldman (Netherlands) Betty Stöve (United States) Valerie Ziegenfuss (United Kingdom) Corinne Molesworth

=== March ===
Week	Tournament	Champions	Runners-up	Semifinalists	Quarterfinalists
7 Mar	Maureen Connolly Brinker International; Dallas, United States; Virginia Slims $32,775	(United States) Nancy Gunter; 7–6^{(5–2)}, 6–1	(United States) Billie Jean King	(Australia) Evonne Goolagong (Australia) Lesley Hunt	(United States) Wendy Overton (United States) Chris Evert (United Kingdom) Nell Truman (Australia) Kerry Melville
7 Mar	Maureen Connolly Brinker International; Dallas, United States; Virginia Slims $32,775	(United States) Rosie Casals (United States) Billie Jean King; 6–3, 4–6, 7–5	(Australia) Judy Dalton (France) Françoise Dürr	(Australia) Evonne Goolagong (Australia) Lesley Hunt	(United States) Wendy Overton (United States) Chris Evert (United Kingdom) Nell Truman (Australia) Kerry Melville
21 Mar	Federation Cup; Johannesburg, South Africa; Federation Cup; Hard – 31 teams knockout	South Africa; 2–1	Great Britain	Australia; United States	Italy; West Germany; France; Netherlands
21 Mar	Virginia Slims of Richmond; Richmond, Virginia, United States; Virginia Slims; Clay – $18,000	(United States) Billie Jean King; 6–3, 6–4	(United States) Nancy Gunter	(Australia) Kerry Melville (3rd) (United States) Rosie Casals (4th)	(Australia) Wendy Gilchrist (Czechoslovakia) Marie Neumannová (United States) Janet Newberry (Indonesia) Lany Kaligis
21 Mar	Virginia Slims of Richmond; Richmond, Virginia, United States; Virginia Slims; Clay – $18,000	(United States) Rosie Casals (United States) Billie Jean King; 7–5, 7–6	(Australia) Judy Dalton (Australia) Karen Krantzcke	(Australia) Kerry Melville (3rd) (United States) Rosie Casals (4th)	(Australia) Wendy Gilchrist (Czechoslovakia) Marie Neumannová (United States) Janet Newberry (Indonesia) Lany Kaligis
27 Mar	South African Open; Johannesburg, South Africa; Grand Prix; Hard – 64S/16D	(Australia) Evonne Goolagong; 4–6, 6–3, 6–0	(United Kingdom) Virginia Wade	(South Africa) Pat Walkden (France) Gail Sherriff Chanfreau	(South Africa) Allison McMillan (Australia) Lesley Hunt (Australia) Helen Gourlay (South Africa) Winnie Shaw
27 Mar	South African Open; Johannesburg, South Africa; Grand Prix; Hard – 64S/16D	(Australia) Evonne Goolagong (Australia) Helen Gourlay; 6–1, 6–4	(South Africa) Winnie Shaw (United Kingdom) Joyce Williams	(South Africa) Pat Walkden (France) Gail Sherriff Chanfreau	(South Africa) Allison McMillan (Australia) Lesley Hunt (Australia) Helen Gourlay (South Africa) Winnie Shaw
27 Mar	Caribe Hilton Invitational; San Juan, Puerto Rico; Virginia Slims; Hard – $18,000	(United States) Nancy Gunter; 6–1, 6–3	(United States) Chris Evert	(United States) Rosie Casals (United States) Billie Jean King	(United Kingdom) Corinne Molesworth (Australia) Kerry Melville (United States) Wendy Overton (United Kingdom) Nell Truman
27 Mar	Caribe Hilton Invitational; San Juan, Puerto Rico; Virginia Slims; Hard – $18,000	(United States) Rosie Casals (United States) Billie Jean King; 6–2, 6–3	(Australia) Judy Dalton (Australia) Karen Krantzcke	(United States) Rosie Casals (United States) Billie Jean King	(United Kingdom) Corinne Molesworth (Australia) Kerry Melville (United States) Wendy Overton (United Kingdom) Nell Truman

=== April ===
Week	Tournament	Champions	Runners-up	Semifinalists	Quarterfinalists
3 Apr	Virginia Slims of Jacksonville; Jacksonville, Florida, United States; Virginia Slims $18,000	(Czechoslovakia) Marie Neumannová; 6–4, 6–3	(United States) Billie Jean King	(Indonesia) Lita Liem (Australia) Kerry Harris	(Australia) Karen Krantzcke (Australia) Judy Dalton (United Kingdom) Corinne Molesworth (Australia) Kerry Melville
3 Apr	Virginia Slims of Jacksonville; Jacksonville, Florida, United States; Virginia Slims $18,000	(Australia) Judy Dalton (Australia) Karen Krantzcke; 7–5, 6–4	(Canada) Vicki Berner (United States) Billie Jean King	(Indonesia) Lita Liem (Australia) Kerry Harris	(Australia) Karen Krantzcke (Australia) Judy Dalton (United Kingdom) Corinne Molesworth (Australia) Kerry Melville
10 Apr	Virginia Slims Masters; St. Petersburg, Florida, United States; Virginia Slims $18,000	(United States) Nancy Gunter; 6–3, 6–4	(United States) Chris Evert	(United States) Billie Jean King (Australia) Judy Dalton	(France) Françoise Dürr (Australia) Karen Krantzcke (Australia) Kerry Melville (United States) Jeanne Evert
10 Apr	Virginia Slims Masters; St. Petersburg, Florida, United States; Virginia Slims $18,000	(Australia) Karen Krantzcke (United States) Wendy Overton; 7–5, 6–4	(Australia) Judy Dalton (France) Françoise Dürr	(United States) Billie Jean King (Australia) Judy Dalton	(France) Françoise Dürr (Australia) Karen Krantzcke (Australia) Kerry Melville (United States) Jeanne Evert
17 Apr	Virginia Slims Conquistadores; Tucson, United States; Virginia Slims; Hard – $18,000	(United States) Billie Jean King; 6–0, 6–3	(France) Françoise Dürr	(United States) Rosie Casals (3rd) (Australia) Judy Dalton (4th)	(Australia) Kerry Harris (United States) Valerie Ziegenfuss (United States) Janet Newberry (Australia) Karen Krantzcke
17 Apr	Virginia Slims Conquistadores; Tucson, United States; Virginia Slims; Hard – $18,000	(Australia) Kerry Harris (Australia) Karen Krantzcke; 6–3, 6–7, 6–3	(Australia) Judy Dalton (France) Françoise Dürr	(United States) Rosie Casals (3rd) (Australia) Judy Dalton (4th)	(Australia) Kerry Harris (United States) Valerie Ziegenfuss (United States) Janet Newberry (Australia) Karen Krantzcke
24 Apr	Italian Open; Rome, Italy; Grand Prix	(United States) Linda Tuero; 6–4, 6–3	(Soviet Union) Olga Morozova	(West Germany) Helga Masthoff (France) Gail Chanfreau	(Czechoslovakia) Vlasta Vopičková (West Germany) Heide Orth (South Africa) Laura Rossouw (Czechoslovakia) Alena Palmeová
24 Apr	Italian Open; Rome, Italy; Grand Prix	(Australia) Lesley Hunt (Soviet Union) Olga Morozova; 6–3, 6–4	(France) Gail Chanfreau (Italy) Rosalba Vido	(West Germany) Helga Masthoff (France) Gail Chanfreau	(Czechoslovakia) Vlasta Vopičková (West Germany) Heide Orth (South Africa) Laura Rossouw (Czechoslovakia) Alena Palmeová

=== May ===
Week	Tournament	Champions	Runners-up	Semifinalists	Quarterfinalists
1 May	Virginia Slims of Indianapolis; Indianapolis, United States; Virginia Slims $20,000	(United States) Billie Jean King; 6–3, 6–3	(United States) Nancy Gunter	(United States) Wendy Overton (United States) Rosie Casals	(United States) Mary-Ann Eisel (France) Françoise Dürr (Australia) Judy Dalton (Australia) Karen Krantzcke
1 May	Virginia Slims of Indianapolis; Indianapolis, United States; Virginia Slims $20,000	(United States) Rosie Casals (Australia) Karen Krantzcke; 6–3, 6–2	(Australia) Judy Dalton (France) Françoise Dürr	(United States) Wendy Overton (United States) Rosie Casals	(United States) Mary-Ann Eisel (France) Françoise Dürr (Australia) Judy Dalton (Australia) Karen Krantzcke
8 May	Rothmans Hardcourt Championships; Bournemouth, United Kingdom; Grand Prix; Clay	(Australia) Evonne Goolagong; 6–0, 6–4	(West Germany) Helga Masthoff	(United States) Sharon Walsh (United Kingdom) Joyce Williams	(West Germany) Katja Ebbinghaus (Australia) Helen Gourlay (France) Gail Chanfreau (United Kingdom) Virginia Wade
8 May	Rothmans Hardcourt Championships; Bournemouth, United Kingdom; Grand Prix; Clay	(Australia) Evonne Goolagong (Australia) Helen Gourlay; 7–5, 6–1	(South Africa) Brenda Kirk (Netherlands) Betty Stöve	(United States) Sharon Walsh (United Kingdom) Joyce Williams	(West Germany) Katja Ebbinghaus (Australia) Helen Gourlay (France) Gail Chanfreau (United Kingdom) Virginia Wade
15 May	Surrey Hardcourt Championships; Guildford, United Kingdom; ILTF	(Australia) Evonne Goolagong; 7–5, 6–2	(United Kingdom) Joyce Williams	(United Kingdom) Nell Truman (Australia) Helen Gourlay	
15 May	Surrey Hardcourt Championships; Guildford, United Kingdom; ILTF	(Australia) Evonne Goolagong (Australia) Helen Gourlay; 6–2, 6–1	(United Kingdom) Winnie Shaw (United Kingdom) Joyce Williams	(United Kingdom) Nell Truman (Australia) Helen Gourlay	
May 22; 29 May	French Open; Paris, France; Grand Slam; Clay (red) – 56S/47Q/32D/32X; Singles – Doubles – Mixed doubles	(United States) Billie Jean King; 6–3, 6–3	(Australia) Evonne Goolagong	(West Germany) Helga Masthoff (France) Françoise Dürr	(West Germany) Katja Ebbinghaus (United Kingdom) Virginia Wade (Soviet Union) Olga Morozova (United Kingdom) Corinne Molesworth
May 22; 29 May	French Open; Paris, France; Grand Slam; Clay (red) – 56S/47Q/32D/32X; Singles – Doubles – Mixed doubles	(United States) Billie Jean King (Netherlands) Betty Stöve; 6–1, 6–2	(United Kingdom) Winnie Shaw (United Kingdom) Nell Truman	(West Germany) Helga Masthoff (France) Françoise Dürr	(West Germany) Katja Ebbinghaus (United Kingdom) Virginia Wade (Soviet Union) Olga Morozova (United Kingdom) Corinne Molesworth
May 22; 29 May	French Open; Paris, France; Grand Slam; Clay (red) – 56S/47Q/32D/32X; Singles – Doubles – Mixed doubles	(Australia) Evonne Goolagong (Australia) Kim Warwick; 6–2, 6–4	(France) Françoise Dürr (France) Jean-Claude Barclay	(West Germany) Helga Masthoff (France) Françoise Dürr	(West Germany) Katja Ebbinghaus (United Kingdom) Virginia Wade (Soviet Union) Olga Morozova (United Kingdom) Corinne Molesworth

=== June ===
Week	Tournament	Champions	Runners-up	Semifinalists	Quarterfinalists
5 June	German Open; Hamburg, Germany; Grand Prix; Clay	(West Germany) Helga Masthoff; 6–3, 3–6, 8–6	(United States) Linda Tuero	(Japan) Kazuko Sawamatsu (United States) Valerie Ziegenfuss	(Netherlands) Marijke Jansen (Hungary) Judit Szörényi (Czechoslovakia) Vlasta Vopičková (Germany) Edith Winkens
5 June	German Open; Hamburg, Germany; Grand Prix; Clay	(West Germany) Helga Masthoff (West Germany) Heide Orth; 6–3, 2–6, 6–0	(United States) Wendy Overton (United States) Valerie Ziegenfuss	(Japan) Kazuko Sawamatsu (United States) Valerie Ziegenfuss	(Netherlands) Marijke Jansen (Hungary) Judit Szörényi (Czechoslovakia) Vlasta Vopičková (Germany) Edith Winkens
5 June	John Player Tournament; Nottingham, United Kingdom; ILTF; Grass, Round-robin	(United States) Billie Jean King (1st)	(Australia) Evonne Goolagong (2nd)	(United States) Rosie Casals (3rd)	(United Kingdom) Virginia Wade (4th)
12 June	W. D. & H.O. Wills Open; Bristol, United Kingdom; Grand Prix; Grass; Singles – Doubles	(United States) Billie Jean King; 6–3, 6–2	(Australia) Kerry Melville	(United States) Rosie Casals (Australia) Evonne Goolagong	(South Africa) Laura Rossouw (Australia) Helen Gourlay (Netherlands) Betty Stöve (France) Françoise Dürr
12 June	W. D. & H.O. Wills Open; Bristol, United Kingdom; Grand Prix; Grass; Singles – Doubles	(Australia) Helen Gourlay (Australia) Karen Krantzcke; 6–4, 6–2	(United States) Rosie Casals (United States) Billie Jean King	(United States) Rosie Casals (Australia) Evonne Goolagong	(South Africa) Laura Rossouw (Australia) Helen Gourlay (Netherlands) Betty Stöve (France) Françoise Dürr
12 June	Wightman Cup; London, United Kingdom; Grass; Team event	United States; 5–2	Great Britain		
19 June	Rothman's Queens Club; London, United Kingdom; ILTF; Grass	(United States) Chris Evert; 6–4, 6–0	(Australia) Karen Krantzcke	(United States) Wendy Overton (Australia) Patricia Coleman	(South Africa) Esmé Emmanuel (United States) Pam Teeguarden (United States) Valerie Ziegenfuss (United Kingdom) Winnie Shaw
19 June	Rothman's Queens Club; London, United Kingdom; ILTF; Grass	(United States) Rosie Casals (United States) Billie Jean King; 5–7, 6–0, 6–2	(South Africa) Brenda Kirk (South Africa) Pat Walkden-Pretorius	(United States) Wendy Overton (Australia) Patricia Coleman	(South Africa) Esmé Emmanuel (United States) Pam Teeguarden (United States) Valerie Ziegenfuss (United Kingdom) Winnie Shaw
26 June; 3 July	Wimbledon Championships; London, Great Britain; Grand Slam; Grass – 96S/48D/80X; Singles – Doubles – Mixed doubles	(United States) Billie Jean King; 6–3, 6–3	(Australia) Evonne Goolagong	(United States) Chris Evert (United States) Rosie Casals	(France) Françoise Dürr (United States) Patti Hogan (United States) Nancy Gunter (United Kingdom) Virginia Wade
26 June; 3 July	Wimbledon Championships; London, Great Britain; Grand Slam; Grass – 96S/48D/80X; Singles – Doubles – Mixed doubles	(United States) Billie Jean King (Netherlands) Betty Stöve; 6–2, 4–6, 6–3	(Australia) Judy Dalton (France) Françoise Dürr	(United States) Chris Evert (United States) Rosie Casals	(France) Françoise Dürr (United States) Patti Hogan (United States) Nancy Gunter (United Kingdom) Virginia Wade
26 June; 3 July	Wimbledon Championships; London, Great Britain; Grand Slam; Grass – 96S/48D/80X; Singles – Doubles – Mixed doubles	(United States) Rosie Casals (Romania) Ilie Năstase; 6–4, 6–4	(Australia) Evonne Goolagong (Australia) Kim Warwick	(United States) Chris Evert (United States) Rosie Casals	(France) Françoise Dürr (United States) Patti Hogan (United States) Nancy Gunter (United Kingdom) Virginia Wade

=== July ===
Week	Tournament	Champions	Runners-up	Semifinalists	Quarterfinalists
10 July	Green Shield Welsh Championships; Newport, Wales; Grand Prix; Grass	(Australia) Kerry Melville; 6–3, 6–2	(United Kingdom) Virginia Wade	(United Kingdom) Winnie Shaw (United Kingdom) Joyce Williams	(Netherlands) Betty Stöve (United States) Patti Hogan (United States) Carole Graebner (Australia) Helen Gourlay
10 July	Green Shield Welsh Championships; Newport, Wales; Grand Prix; Grass	(Australia) Judy Dalton (Netherlands) Betty Stöve; 7–5, 6–4	(Australia) Kerry Harris (Australia) Kerry Melville	(United Kingdom) Winnie Shaw (United Kingdom) Joyce Williams	(Netherlands) Betty Stöve (United States) Patti Hogan (United States) Carole Graebner (Australia) Helen Gourlay
10 July	Carroll's Irish Open; Dublin, Ireland; Grand Prix; Grass	(Australia) Evonne Goolagong; 2–6, 6–1, 6–2	(South Africa) Pat Walkden-Pretorius	(Australia) Karen Krantzcke (Australia) Lesley Hunt	(Republic of Ireland) Sue Minford (Republic of Ireland) Geraldine Barniville (South Africa) Brenda Kirk (United States) Cecilia Martinez
10 July	Carroll's Irish Open; Dublin, Ireland; Grand Prix; Grass	(South Africa) Brenda Kirk (South Africa) Pat Walkden-Pretorius; 6–3, 8–10, 6–2	(Australia) Evonne Goolagong (Australia) Karen Krantzcke	(Australia) Karen Krantzcke (Australia) Lesley Hunt	(Republic of Ireland) Sue Minford (Republic of Ireland) Geraldine Barniville (South Africa) Brenda Kirk (United States) Cecilia Martinez
17 July	Rothmans North of England Championships; Hoylake, United Kingdom; Grand Prix; Grass	(Australia) Evonne Goolagong vs (Netherlands) Betty Stöve; Title Shared			
17 July	Rothmans North of England Championships; Hoylake, United Kingdom; Grand Prix; Grass	(Australia) Evonne Goolagong / (Australia) Helen Gourlay vs (South Africa) Brenda Kirk / (South Africa) Pat Walkden-Pretorius; Title Shared			
31 July	Virginia Slims of Columbus; Columbus, Georgia, United States; Virginia Slims $25,500	(United States) Rosie Casals; 6–7^{(2–5)}, 7–6^{(5–0)}, 6–0	(France) Françoise Dürr	(United States) Billie Jean King (United States) Valerie Ziegenfuss	(Australia) Helen Gourlay (Australia) Lesley Hunt (United States) Wendy Overton (United States) Nancy Gunter
31 July	Virginia Slims of Columbus; Columbus, Georgia, United States; Virginia Slims $25,500	(France) Françoise Dürr (Australia) Helen Gourlay; 6–4, 6–3	(Australia) Kerry Harris (Australia) Kerry Melville	(United States) Billie Jean King (United States) Valerie Ziegenfuss	(Australia) Helen Gourlay (Australia) Lesley Hunt (United States) Wendy Overton (United States) Nancy Gunter
31 July	Western Open Championships; Cincinnati, United States; Grand Prix	(Australia) Margaret Court; 3–6, 6–2, 7–5	(Australia) Evonne Goolagong	(United States) Linda Tuero (France) Nathalie Fuchs	(Colombia) Isabel Fernández de Soto (United States) Sue Stap (United States) Janice Metcalf (South Africa) Pat Walkden-Pretorius
31 July	Western Open Championships; Cincinnati, United States; Grand Prix	(Australia) Margaret Court (Australia) Evonne Goolagong; 6–4, 6–1	(South Africa) Brenda Kirk (South Africa) Pat Walkden-Pretorius	(United States) Linda Tuero (France) Nathalie Fuchs	(Colombia) Isabel Fernández de Soto (United States) Sue Stap (United States) Janice Metcalf (South Africa) Pat Walkden-Pretorius

=== August ===
Week	Tournament	Champions	Runners-up	Semifinalists	Quarterfinalists
7 Aug	U.S. Clay Court Championships; Indianapolis, United States; Grand Prix; Clay – $60,000 – 32S/16D	(United States) Chris Evert; 7–6^{(5–2)}, 6–1	(Australia) Evonne Goolagong	(Australia) Margaret Court (United States) Linda Tuero	(Australia) Lesley Hunt (South Africa) Pat Walkden (United States) Pam Teeguarden (United States) Julie Heldman
7 Aug	U.S. Clay Court Championships; Indianapolis, United States; Grand Prix; Clay – $60,000 – 32S/16D	(Australia) Evonne Goolagong (Australia) Lesley Hunt; 6–2, 6–1	(Australia) Margaret Court (United States) Pam Teeguarden	(Australia) Margaret Court (United States) Linda Tuero	(Australia) Lesley Hunt (South Africa) Pat Walkden (United States) Pam Teeguarden (United States) Julie Heldman
14 Aug	Virginia Slims of Denver; Denver, United States; Virginia Slims $25,000	(United States) Nancy Gunter; 1–6, 6–4, 6–4	(United States) Billie Jean King	(United States) Valerie Ziegenfuss (3rd) (Australia) Lesley Hunt (4th)	(United States) Julie Heldman (France) Françoise Dürr (United States) Kristy Pigeon (United States) Jana Cooper
14 Aug	Virginia Slims of Denver; Denver, United States; Virginia Slims $25,000	(France) Françoise Dürr (Australia) Lesley Hunt; 6–0, 6–3	(Australia) Helen Gourlay (Australia) Karen Krantzcke	(United States) Valerie Ziegenfuss (3rd) (Australia) Lesley Hunt (4th)	(United States) Julie Heldman (France) Françoise Dürr (United States) Kristy Pigeon (United States) Jana Cooper
14 Aug	Rothmans Canadian Open; Toronto, Canada; Grand Prix; Carpet(i) – 8S/2D	(Australia) Evonne Goolagong; 6–3, 6–1	(United Kingdom) Virginia Wade	(United States) Linda Tuero (Australia) Margaret Court	(South Africa) Pat Walkden-Pretorius (Uruguay) Fiorella Bonicelli (France) Nathalie Fuchs (United States) Andrea Martin
14 Aug	Rothmans Canadian Open; Toronto, Canada; Grand Prix; Carpet(i) – 8S/2D	(Australia) Margaret Court (Australia) Evonne Goolagong; 3–6, 6–3, 7–5	(South Africa) Brenda Kirk (South Africa) Pat Walkden-Pretorius	(United States) Linda Tuero (Australia) Margaret Court	(South Africa) Pat Walkden-Pretorius (Uruguay) Fiorella Bonicelli (France) Nathalie Fuchs (United States) Andrea Martin
21 Aug	Virginia Slims of Newport; Newport, Rhode Island, United States; Virginia Slims $18,000	(Australia) Margaret Court; 6–4, 6–1	(United States) Billie Jean King	(United States) Chris Evert (3rd) (United States) Julie Heldman (4th)	(United States) Pam Teeguarden (Australia) Kerry Melville (United States) Rosie Casals (United States) Wendy Overton
21 Aug	Virginia Slims of Newport; Newport, Rhode Island, United States; Virginia Slims $18,000	(Australia) Margaret Court (Australia) Lesley Hunt; 6–2, 6–2	(United States) Rosie Casals (United States) Billie Jean King	(United States) Chris Evert (3rd) (United States) Julie Heldman (4th)	(United States) Pam Teeguarden (Australia) Kerry Melville (United States) Rosie Casals (United States) Wendy Overton
21 Aug	Eastern Grass Court Championships; South Orange, New Jersey, United States; ILTF; Grass	(Soviet Union) Olga Morozova; 6–2, 6–7, 7–5	(Soviet Union) Marina Kroschina		
21 Aug	Eastern Grass Court Championships; South Orange, New Jersey, United States; ILTF; Grass	(Soviet Union) Marina Kroschina (Soviet Union) Olga Morozova; 6–7, 6–2, 6–2	(United States) Carole Caldwell Graebner (United States) Patti Hogan		
21 Aug	Pennsylvanian Championships; Merion, Pennsylvania, United States; ILTF	(United Kingdom) Virginia Wade; 6–4, 6–1	(United States) Carrie Fleming		
21 Aug	Pennsylvanian Championships; Merion, Pennsylvania, United States; ILTF	(United Kingdom) Virginia Wade (United States) Sharon Walsh; 7–6, 6–2	(South Africa) Brenda Kirk (South Africa) Pat Walkden-Pretorius		
28 Aug; 4 Sep	US Open; New York City, United States; Grand Slam; Grass – 64S/32D/51X; Singles – Doubles – Mixed doubles	(United States) Billie Jean King; 6–3, 7–5	(Australia) Kerry Melville	(Australia) Margaret Court (United States) Chris Evert	(United Kingdom) Virginia Wade (United States) Rosie Casals (Soviet Union) Olga Morozova (United States) Pam Teeguarden
28 Aug; 4 Sep	US Open; New York City, United States; Grand Slam; Grass – 64S/32D/51X; Singles – Doubles – Mixed doubles	(France) Françoise Dürr (Netherlands) Betty Stöve; 6–3, 1–6, 6–3	(Australia) Margaret Court (United Kingdom) Virginia Wade	(Australia) Margaret Court (United States) Chris Evert	(United Kingdom) Virginia Wade (United States) Rosie Casals (Soviet Union) Olga Morozova (United States) Pam Teeguarden
28 Aug; 4 Sep	US Open; New York City, United States; Grand Slam; Grass – 64S/32D/51X; Singles – Doubles – Mixed doubles	(Australia) Margaret Court (United States) Marty Riessen; 6–3, 7–5	(United States) Rosie Casals (Romania) Ilie Năstase	(Australia) Margaret Court (United States) Chris Evert	(United Kingdom) Virginia Wade (United States) Rosie Casals (Soviet Union) Olga Morozova (United States) Pam Teeguarden

=== September ===
Week	Tournament	Champions	Runners-up	Semifinalists	Quarterfinalists
11 Sep	Four Roses Classic; Charlotte, United States; Virginia Slims $40,000	(United States) Billie Jean King; 6–2, 6–2	(Australia) Margaret Court	(United States) Rosie Casals (United States) Nancy Gunter	(United States) Mona Schallau (Australia) Kerry Melville (France) Françoise Dürr (United States) Wendy Overton
11 Sep	Four Roses Classic; Charlotte, United States; Virginia Slims $40,000	(France) Françoise Dürr & (Netherlands) Betty Stöve vs (Australia) Margaret Court & (Australia) Lesley Hunt (Divided)		(United States) Rosie Casals (United States) Nancy Gunter	(United States) Mona Schallau (Australia) Kerry Melville (France) Françoise Dürr (United States) Wendy Overton
18 Sep	Virginia Slims Golden Gate Classic; Oakland, United States; Virginia Slims $20,000	(Australia) Margaret Court; 6–4, 6–1	(United States) Billie Jean King	(United States) Rosie Casals (3rd) (Australia) Kerry Melville (4th)	(United States) Julie Heldman (United Kingdom) Veronica Burton (Australia) Lesley Hunt (United States) Mona Schallau
18 Sep	Virginia Slims Golden Gate Classic; Oakland, United States; Virginia Slims $20,000	(United Kingdom) Ann Jones (United States) Billie Jean King; 7–5, 2–6, 7–6^{(5–4)}	(Australia) Margaret Court (Australia) Lesley Hunt	(United States) Rosie Casals (3rd) (Australia) Kerry Melville (4th)	(United States) Julie Heldman (United Kingdom) Veronica Burton (Australia) Lesley Hunt (United States) Mona Schallau
25 Sep	Virginia Slims of Phoenix; Phoenix, United States; Virginia Slims $25,000	(United States) Billie Jean King; 7–6^{(5–3)}, 6–3	(Australia) Margaret Court	(United States) Rosie Casals (3rd) (United States) Wendy Overton (4th)	(United Kingdom) Veronica Burton (Australia) Karen Krantzcke (France) Françoise Dürr (United States) Nancy Gunter
25 Sep	Virginia Slims of Phoenix; Phoenix, United States; Virginia Slims $25,000	(United States) Rosie Casals (United States) Wendy Overton; 6–4, 6–3	(France) Françoise Dürr (Netherlands) Betty Stöve	(United States) Rosie Casals (3rd) (United States) Wendy Overton (4th)	(United Kingdom) Veronica Burton (Australia) Karen Krantzcke (France) Françoise Dürr (United States) Nancy Gunter

=== October ===
Week	Tournament	Champions	Runners-up	Semifinalists	Quarterfinalists
9 Oct	Virginia Slims Championships; Boca Raton, United States; Year-end championships $100,900; Draw	(United States) Chris Evert; 7–5, 6–4	(Australia) Kerry Melville	(France) Françoise Dürr (3rd) (United States) Billie Jean King (4th)	(United States) Wendy Overton (Australia) Karen Krantzcke (United States) Jeanne Evert (Netherlands) Betty Stöve
16 Oct	Spanish International Open Championships; Barcelona, Spain; ILTF	(France) Gail Chanfreau; 6–1, 6–4	(France) Nathalie Fuchs		
16 Oct	Spanish International Open Championships; Barcelona, Spain; ILTF	(France) Gail Chanfreau (France) Nathalie Fuchs; 6–1, 6–4	(Belgium) Michele Gurdal (Belgium) Monique Van Haver		
16 Oct	Dewar Cup Billingham; Billingham, United Kingdom; ILTF	(Australia) Margaret Court; 7–5, 6–1	(United States) Julie Heldman	(South Africa) Brenda Kirk (United Kingdom) Virginia Wade	(United Kingdom) Jackie Fayter (United States) Sharon Walsh (United Kingdom) Sue Mappin (United Kingdom) Corinne Molesworth
16 Oct	Dewar Cup Billingham; Billingham, United Kingdom; ILTF	(Australia) Margaret Court (United Kingdom) Virginia Wade; 6–3, 6–2	(United States) Patti Hogan (United States) Sharon Walsh	(South Africa) Brenda Kirk (United Kingdom) Virginia Wade	(United Kingdom) Jackie Fayter (United States) Sharon Walsh (United Kingdom) Sue Mappin (United Kingdom) Corinne Molesworth
23 Oct	Dewar Cup Edinburgh; Edinburgh, United Kingdom; ILTF	(Australia) Margaret Court; 6–3, 3–6, 7–5	(United Kingdom) Virginia Wade	(South Africa) Brenda Kirk (Netherlands) Betty Stöve	(Australia) Wendy Gilchrist (United Kingdom) Corinne Molesworth (United States) Julie Heldman (United States) Sharon Walsh
23 Oct	Dewar Cup Edinburgh; Edinburgh, United Kingdom; ILTF	(Australia) Margaret Court (United Kingdom) Virginia Wade; 6–2, 6–3	(United States) Julie Heldman (Netherlands) Betty Stöve	(South Africa) Brenda Kirk (Netherlands) Betty Stöve	(Australia) Wendy Gilchrist (United Kingdom) Corinne Molesworth (United States) Julie Heldman (United States) Sharon Walsh
30 Oct	Dewar Cup Aberavon; Aberavon, United Kingdom; ILTF	(Australia) Margaret Court; 6–3, 6–4	(United Kingdom) Virginia Wade	(Netherlands) Betty Stöve (United States) Julie Heldman	(United Kingdom) Corinne Molesworth (United States) Sharon Walsh (South Africa) Brenda Kirk (Australia) Wendy Gilchrist
30 Oct	Dewar Cup Aberavon; Aberavon, United Kingdom; ILTF	(Australia) Margaret Court (United Kingdom) Virginia Wade; 6–0, 6–3	(United States) Julie Heldman (Netherlands) Betty Stöve	(Netherlands) Betty Stöve (United States) Julie Heldman	(United Kingdom) Corinne Molesworth (United States) Sharon Walsh (South Africa) Brenda Kirk (Australia) Wendy Gilchrist

=== November ===
Week	Tournament	Champions	Runners-up	Semifinalists	Quarterfinalists
6 Nov	Dewar Cup Torquay; Torquay, United Kingdom; ILTF	(Australia) Margaret Court; 2–6, 6–3, 6–1	(United Kingdom) Virginia Wade	(United States) Julie Heldman (South Africa) Brenda Kirk	(United States) Patti Hogan (United Kingdom) Corinne Molesworth (Netherlands) Betty Stöve (United States) Sharon Walsh
6 Nov	Dewar Cup Torquay; Torquay, United Kingdom; ILTF	(Australia) Margaret Court (United Kingdom) Virginia Wade; 6–4, 6–4	(South Africa) Brenda Kirk (United States) Sharon Walsh	(United States) Julie Heldman (South Africa) Brenda Kirk	(United States) Patti Hogan (United Kingdom) Corinne Molesworth (Netherlands) Betty Stöve (United States) Sharon Walsh
13 Nov	Dewar Cup Final; Nottingham, United Kingdom; ILTF	(Australia) Margaret Court; 6–1, 6–1	(United Kingdom) Virginia Wade	(Netherlands) Betty Stöve (United States) Julie Heldman	(Australia) Wendy Gilchrist (United Kingdom) Corinne Molesworth (South Africa) Brenda Kirk (United States) Sharon Walsh
20 Nov	Australian Hardcourt Championships; Melbourne, Australia; ILTF; Hard	(Australia) Evonne Goolagong; 6–7, 6–2, 6–2	(Australia) Patricia Coleman		
20 Nov	Australian Hardcourt Championships; Melbourne, Australia; ILTF; Hard	(Australia) Evonne Goolagong (Australia) Janet Young; 2–6, 6–4, 6–3	(Australia) Patricia Coleman (Australia) Sally Irvine		
27 Nov	Queensland Championships; Brisbane, Australia; ILTF	(Australia) Evonne Goolagong; 6–0, 7–5	(United Kingdom) Glynis Coles	(Australia) Barbara Hawcroft (United Kingdom) Lesley Charles	Gai Healey (Australia) Marilyn Tesch (Australia) Wendy Turnbull (Australia) Patricia Coleman
27 Nov	Queensland Championships; Brisbane, Australia; ILTF	(Australia) Janet Fallis / (Australia) Evonne Goolagong vs (Australia) Barbara Hawcroft / (Australia) Marilyn Tesch; No Contest		(Australia) Barbara Hawcroft (United Kingdom) Lesley Charles	Gai Healey (Australia) Marilyn Tesch (Australia) Wendy Turnbull (Australia) Patricia Coleman
27 Nov	Argentine Open; Buenos Aires, Argentina; ILTF; Clay	(United Kingdom) Virginia Wade; 6–4, 6–1	(Uruguay) Fiorella Bonicelli		
27 Nov	Argentine Open; Buenos Aires, Argentina; ILTF; Clay	(West Germany) Helga Masthoff (United States) Pam Teeguarden; 6–4, 6–1	(Chile) Ana María Arias (United Kingdom) Virginia Wade		

=== December ===
Week	Tournament	Champions	Runners-up	Semifinalists	Quarterfinalists
4 Dec	Western Australian Championships; Perth, Australia; ILTF	(Australia) Margaret Court; 6–3, 6–2	(Australia) Evonne Goolagong	(Australia) Lesley Hunt (Japan) Kazuko Sawamatsu	(France) Nathalie Fuchs (Australia) Christine Matison (United Kingdom) Glynis Coles (Belgium) Monique van Haver
11 Dec	South Australian Championships; Adelaide, Australia; ILTF	(Australia) Evonne Goolagong; 6–1, 6–2	(Australia) Kerry Harris		
11 Dec	South Australian Championships; Adelaide, Australia; ILTF	(Soviet Union) Eugenia Birioukova (Australia) Janet Young; 6–3, 6–2	(Australia) Evonne Goolagong (Australia) Helen Gourlay		
18 Dec	New South Wales Open; Sydney, Australia; ILTF	(Australia) Margaret Court; 6–3, 6–2	(Australia) Evonne Goolagong		
18 Dec	New South Wales Open; Sydney, Australia; ILTF	(Australia) Evonne Goolagong (United States) Melissa Edwards; 6–1, 6–2	(Australia) Lesley Turner (United Kingdom) Virginia Wade		

== Statistical information ==
These tables present the number of singles (S), doubles (D), and mixed doubles (X) titles won by each player and each nation during the 1972 Virginia Slims Circuit. They also include data for the Grand Slam tournaments and the year-end championships. The table is sorted by:

1. total number of titles (a doubles title won by two players representing the same nation counts as only one win for the nation);
2. highest amount of highest category tournaments (for example, having a single Grand Slam gives preference over any kind of combination without a Grand Slam title);
3. a singles > doubles > mixed doubles hierarchy;
4. alphabetical order (by family names for players).

Key

Grand Slam tournaments
Year-end championships
Virginia Slims event

=== Titles won by player ===
Total	Player	S	D	X	S	S	D	S	D	X
16	Billie Jean King (USA)	● ● ●	● ●			● ● ● ● ● ●	● ● ● ● ●	9	7	0
13	Rosie Casals (USA)			●		● ● ●	● ● ● ● ● ● ● ● ●	3	9	1
5	Virginia Wade (GBR)	●				●	● ● ●	2	3	0
5	Nancy Gunter (USA)					● ● ● ● ●		5	0	0
4	Françoise Durr (FRA)		●				● ● ●	0	4	0
4	Margaret Court (AUS)			●		● ●	●	2	1	1
4	Wendy Overton (USA)						● ● ● ●	0	4	0
4	Karen Krantzcke (AUS)						● ● ● ●	0	4	0
3	Betty Stöve (NED)		● ● ●					0	3	0
2	Helen Gourlay (AUS)		●				●	0	2	0
2	Kerry Harris (AUS)		●				●	0	2	0
2	Chris Evert (USA)				●	●		2	0	0
2	Judy Dalton (AUS)						● ●	0	2	0
2	Lesley Hunt (AUS)						● ●	0	2	0
2	Valerie Ziegenfuss (USA)						● ●	0	2	0
1	Evonne Goolagong (AUS)			●				0	0	1
1	Kerry Melville (AUS)					●		1	0	0
1	Marie Neumannová (TCH)					●		1	0	0
1	Ann Jones (GBR)						●	0	1	0

=== Titles won by nation ===
Total	Nation	S	D	X	S	S	D	S	D	X
35	United States (USA)	3	2	1	1	15	13	19	15	1
14	Australia (AUS)	0	1	2	0	3	8	3	9	2
6	Great Britain (GBR)	1	0	0	0	1	4	2	4	0
4	France (FRA)	0	1	0	0	0	3	0	4	0
3	Netherlands (NED)	0	3	0	0	0	0	0	3	0
1	Czechoslovakia (TCH)	0	0	0	0	1	0	1	0	0

== See also ==
- 1972 World Championship Tennis circuit
- 1972 Grand Prix tennis circuit
