= 1973 Virginia Slims of Tucson =

- Date: March 26 – April 1
- Edition: 2nd
- Category: Virginia Slims Circuit
- Draw: 32S / 12D
- Prize money: $25,000
- Surface: Hard / outdoor
- Location: Tucson, Arizona, U.S.
- Venue: Tucson Racquet Club

Champions

Singles
- (Australia) Kerry Melville

Doubles
- (United States) Janet Newberry / (United States) Pam Teeguarden
← 1972 ·	Virginia Slims of Tucson

The 1973 Virginia Slims of Tucson, also known as the Virginia Slims Conquistadores of Tucson, was a women's tennis tournament played on outdoor hardcourts at the Tucson Racquet Club in Tucson, Arizona in the United States that was part of the Virginia Slims Circuit of the 1973 WTA Tour. It was the second edition of the tournament and was held from March 26 through April 1, 1973. Second-seeded Kerry Melville won the singles title and earned $6,000 first-prize money.

== Finals ==
=== Singles ===
(Australia) Kerry Melville defeated (United States) Nancy Gunter 6–3, 6–3

=== Doubles ===
(United States) Janet Newberry / (United States) Pam Teeguarden defeated (Australia) Karen Krantzcke / (Netherlands) Betty Stöve 3–6, 7–6, 7–5

== Prize money ==
Event	W	F	3rd	4th	QF	Round of 16	Round of 32
Singles	$6,000	$3,000	$1,900	$1,600	$1,000	NA	NA
