= 1972 Virginia Slims Masters =

- Date: April 11–16
- Edition: 2nd
- Category: WT Woman's Pro Tour
- Draw: 16S / 11D
- Prize money: $18,000
- Surface: Clay (Green) / outdoor
- Location: St. Petersburg, Florida, U.S.
- Venue: Bartlett Park Tennis Center

Champions

Singles
- (United States) Nancy Gunter

Doubles
- (Australia) Karen Krantzcke / (United States) Wendy Overton
← 1971 ·	Eckerd Open	· 1973 →

The 1972 Virginia Slims Masters was a women's singles tennis tournament played on outdoor clay court at the Bartlett Park Tennis Center in St. Petersburg, Florida in the United States. The event was part of the 1972 WT Woman's Pro Tour. It was the second edition of the tournament and was held from April 11 through April 16, 1972. Second-seeded Nancy Gunter won the singles title and earned $3,400 first-prize money.

== Finals ==
=== Singles ===
(United States) Nancy Gunter defeated (United States) Chris Evert 6–3, 6–4

=== Doubles ===
(Australia) Karen Krantzcke / (United States) Wendy Overton defeated (Australia) Judy Tegart / (United States) Françoise Dürr 7–5, 6–4

== Prize money ==
Event	W	F	3rd	4th	QF	Round of 16	Round of 32
Singles	$3,400	$2,000	$1,650	$1,450	$750	$350	$100
