= 1972 Virginia Slims of Washington =

- Date: February 24–29
- Edition: 1st
- Category: WT Pro Tour
- Draw: 16S / 8D
- Prize money: $18,000
- Surface: Carpet (Sporteze) / indoor
- Location: Bethesda, Maryland, U.S.
- Venue: Linden Hill Racquet Club

Champions

Singles
- (United States) Nancy Gunter

Doubles
- (United States) Wendy Overton / (United States) Valerie Ziegenfuss
Virginia Slims of Washington	· 1973 →

The 1972 Virginia Slims of Washington was a women's tennis tournament played on indoor carpet courts at the Linden Hill Racquet Club in Bethesda, Maryland in the United States that was part of the 1972 Women's Tennis Circuit. It was the inaugural edition of the tournament and was held from February 24 through February 29, 1972. Unseeded Nancy Gunter won the singles title and earned $3,500 first-prize money.

== Finals ==
=== Singles ===
(United States) Nancy Gunter defeated (United States) Chris Evert 7–6^{(5–1)}, 6–2

=== Doubles ===
(United States) Wendy Overton / (United States) Valerie Ziegenfuss defeated (Australia) Judy Tegart / (France) Françoise Dürr 7–5, 6–2

== Prize money ==
Event	W	F	3rd	4th	QF	Round of 16
Singles	$3,500	$2,400	$1,900	$1,600	$750	$400
