= Jacksonville Open (tennis) =

Defunct tennis tournament
- Tour: ILTF Circuit
- Founded: 1961; 64 years ago
- Abolished: 1977; 48 years ago
- Location: Jacksonville, Florida, United States
- Surface: Hard (outdoor); Hard (indoor)

The Jacksonville Open also known as the Greater Jacksonville Invitation or Greater Jacksonville Open is a defunct men's and women's tennis tournament founded in 1961 as the Jacksonville Invitation originally played on outdoor hard courts later switching to indoor courts. The tournament ran until 1977.

== History ==
The Jacksonville Open tennis tournament was founded in 1961 as the Jacksonville Invitation. The tournament was part South Florida-Caribbean Circuit which was a major feature of the international tennis scene in from the 1930s to early 1970s. In 1972 it part of the 1972 USLTA Indoor Circuit. The event was held in Jacksonville, Florida and was played on indoor hard courts. Jimmy Connors won the singles title, defeating Clark Graebner in the final.

In 1970 a women's event was included in the schedule for one year only that was won by Nancy Richey. In 1972 a Jacksonsville Invitation tournament for women was established as an outdoor clay court event. It sponsorship name was the Virginia Slims of Jacksonville.

== Finals ==
=== Men's singles ===
Year	Winners	Runners-up	Score
1961	(United States) Bill Tym	(United States) Jack Bryan	6–0, 7–5, 11–9
1964	(United States) Paul Scarpa	(United States) Hank Veno	6–1, 6–1
1968	(United States) Clark Graebner	(United States) Ronald Holmberg	8–6, 6–2
1969	(Ecuador) Pancho Guzmán	(Canada) Mike Belkin	6–4, 6–2
1970	(United States) Arthur Ashe	(New Zealand) Brian Fairlie	6–3, 4–6, 6–3
1971	(United States) Tom Edlefsen	(United States) Clark Graebner	7–5, 4–6, 6–3
1972	(United States) Jimmy Connors	(United States) Clark Graebner	7–5, 6–4
1975	(South Africa) Danny Sullivan	(United States) Bill Cantrell	6–4, 5–7, 6–3
1977	(Socialist Federal Republic of Yugoslavia) Zdravko Mincek	(United States) Bill Cantrell	6–3, 6–0

=== Women's singles ===
Note: two editions were held in 1970 in March and May.

Year	Winners	Runners-up	Score
Greater Jacksonville Invitation
1969	(United States) Judy Alvarez	(United States) Wendy Overton	7–5, 2–6, 6–1
Greater Jacksonville Open
1970	(United States) Nancy Richey	(United States) Val Ziegenfuss	6–1, 6–3
Jacksonville Invitation
1970	(Colombia) Isabel Fernández de Soto	(United States) Toni Kramer	6–0, 6–2
