= 1972 Virginia Slims of Washington – Singles =

1972 tennis tournament

Singles
- 1972 Virginia Slims of Washington

Final
- Champion: (United States) Nancy Gunter
- Runner-up: (United States) Chris Evert
- Score: 7–6^{(5–1)}, 6–2

Details
- Draw: 16 (4 Q )
- Seeds: 8

Events
Singles	Doubles
Virginia Slims of Washington	· 1973 →

Unseeded Nancy Gunter won the singles title of the 1972 Virginia Slims of Washington tennis tournament, defeating second-seeded Chris Evert in the final 7–6^{(5–1)}, 6–2. The competition was played on indoor carpet courts at the Linden Hill Racquet Club in Bethesda, Maryland.

== Seeds ==
1. (United States) Billie Jean King (first round)
2. (United States) Chris Evert (final)
3. (United States) Rosie Casals (semifinals)
4. (France) Françoise Dürr (quarterfinals)
5. (Australia) Kerry Melville (semifinals)
6. (Australia) Judy Dalton (first round)
7. (United States) Wendy Overton (quarterfinals)
8. (Australia) Helen Gourlay (first round)

== Draw ==
=== Key ===
- Q = Qualifier
- WC = Wild card
- LL = Lucky loser
- Alt = Alternate
- SE = Special exempt
- PR = Protected ranking
- ITF = ITF entry
- JE = Junior exempt
- w/o = Walkover
- r = Retired
- d = Defaulted
- SR = Special ranking

First round
1	(United States) Billie Jean King	6	4	1
(United States) Julie Heldman	3	6	6
(United States) Nancy Gunter	6	6
8	(Australia) Helen Gourlay	0	2
5	(Australia) Kerry Melville	6	6
Q	(United States) Nancy Ornstein	3	2
4	(France) Françoise Dürr	6	3	6
Q	(Australia) Wendy Gilchrist	1	6	2
3	(United States) Rosie Casals	6	6
(United States) Valerie Ziegenfuss	1	4
Q	(United States) Barbara Downs	6	6
6	(Australia) Judy Dalton	1	1
7	(United States) Wendy Overton	6	7
Q	(Australia) Kerry Harris	3	6
(Australia) Karen Krantzcke	2	2
2	(United States) Chris Evert	6	6

Quarterfinals
(United States) Julie Heldman	2	3
(United States) Nancy Gunter	6	6
5	(Australia) Kerry Melville	6	6
4	(France) Françoise Dürr	1	4
3	(United States) Rosie Casals	7	6
Q	(United States) Barbara Downs	6	1
7	(United States) Wendy Overton	2	4
2	(United States) Chris Evert	6	6	1

Semifinals
(United States) Nancy Gunter	6	6
5	(Australia) Kerry Melville	4	4
3	(United States) Rosie Casals	4	3
2	(United States) Chris Evert	6	6

Final
(United States) Nancy Gunter	7	6
2	(United States) Chris Evert	6	2
