= 1972 Virginia Slims Conquistadores =

- Date: April 17–23
- Edition: 1st
- Category: Virginia Slims Pro Tour; Grand Prix Circuit
- Draw: 32S / 12D
- Prize money: $18,000
- Surface: Hard / outdoor
- Location: Tucson, Arizona, U.S.
- Venue: Tucson Racquet Club

Champions

Singles
- (United States) Billie Jean King

Doubles
- (Australia) Kerry Harris / (Australia) Karen Krantzcke
Virginia Slims of Tucson	· 1973 →

The 1972 Virginia Slims Conquistadores, also known as the Tucson Conquistadores Women's Tennis Tournament, was a women's tennis tournament played on outdoor hardcourts at the Tucson Racquet Club in Tucson, Arizona in the United States that was part of the 1972 Women's Tennis Circuit. It was the inaugural edition of the tournament and was held from April 17 through April 23, 1972. First-seeded Billie Jean King won the singles title and earned $3,400 first-prize money.

== Finals ==
=== Singles ===
(United States) Billie Jean King defeated (France) Françoise Dürr 6–0, 6–3

=== Doubles ===
(Australia) Kerry Harris / (Australia) Karen Krantzcke defeated (Australia) Judy Dalton / (France) Françoise Dürr 6–3, 6–7, 6–3

== Prize money ==
Event	W	F	3rd	4th	QF	Round of 16	Round of 32
Singles	$3,400	$2,400	$1,600	$1,300	$750	$350	$150
