= 1973 Virginia Slims of Jacksonville =

- Date: April 16–22
- Edition: 2nd
- Category: Virginia Slims circuit
- Draw: 32S / ?D
- Prize money: $25,000
- Surface: Clay (Green) / outdoor
- Location: Jacksonville, Florida, U.S.
- Venue: Deerwood Club

Champions

Singles
- (Australia) Margaret Court

Doubles
- (United States) Rosie Casals / (United States) Billie Jean King
← 1972 ·	Virginia Slims of Jacksonville

The 1973 Virginia Slims of Jacksonville, also known as the Jacksonville Invitational, was a women's tennis tournament played on outdoor clay courts at the Deerwood Club in Jacksonville, Florida in the United States that was part of the 1973 Virginia Slims World Championship Series. It was the second and last edition of the tournament and was held from April 16 through April 22, 1973. First-seeded Margaret Court won the singles title and earned $6,000 first-prize money.

== Finals ==
=== Singles ===
(Australia) Margaret Court defeated (United States) Rosie Casals 5–7, 6–3, 6–1

=== Doubles ===
(United States) Rosie Casals / (United States) Billie Jean King defeated (France) Françoise Dürr / (Netherlands) Betty Stöve 7–6, 5–7, 6–3

== Prize money ==
Event	W	F	3rd	4th	QF	Round of 16	Round of 32
Singles	$6,000	$3,000	$1,950	$1,650	?	?	?
