= 1972 Virginia Slims of Jacksonville =

- Date: April 4–9
- Edition: 1st
- Category: Virginia Slims Pro Tour; Grand Prix Circuit
- Draw: 32S / ?D
- Prize money: $18,000
- Surface: Clay (Green) / indoor
- Location: Jacksonville, Florida, U.S.
- Venue: Deerwood Club

Champions

Singles
- (Czechoslovakia) Marie Neumannová

Doubles
- (Australia) Judy Dalton / (Australia) Karen Krantzcke
Virginia Slims of Jacksonville	· 1973 →

The 1972 Virginia Slims of Jacksonville was a women's tennis tournament played on indoor clay courts at the Deerwood Club in Jacksonville, Florida in the United States that was part of the 1972 Women's Tennis Circuit. It was the inaugural edition of the tournament and was held from April 4 through April 9, 1972. Unseeded Marie Neumannová won the singles title and earned $3,400 first-prize money.

== Finals ==
=== Singles ===
(Czechoslovakia) Marie Neumannová defeated (United States) Billie Jean King 6–4, 6–3

=== Doubles ===
(Australia) Judy Dalton / (Australia) Karen Krantzcke defeated (Canada) Vicki Berner / (United States) Billie Jean King 7–5, 6–4

== Prize money ==
Event	W	F	SF	QF	Round of 16	Round of 32
Singles	$3,400	$2,200	$1,450	$750	$350	$100
