= 1973 Virginia Slims of Columbus =

- Date: September 24–30
- Edition: 2nd
- Draw: 32S / 16D
- Prize money: $30,000
- Surface: Clay / outdoor
- Location: Columbus, Georgia, U.S.
- Venue: Columbus Country Club

Champions

Singles
- (United States) Chris Evert

Doubles
- (France) Françoise Dürr / (Netherlands) Betty Stöve
← 1972 ·	Virginia Slims of Columbus

The 1973 Virginia Slims of Columbus was a women's tennis tournament played on outdoorclay courts at the Columbus Country Club in Columbus, Georgia in the United States that was part of the 1973 Virginia Slims World Championship Series. It was the second and final; edition of the tournament and was held from September 24 through September 30, 1973. Second-seeded Chris Evert won the singles title and earned $7,000 first-prize money.

== Finals ==
=== Singles ===
(United States) Chris Evert defeated (Australia) Margaret Court walkover

- It was Evert's 10th title of the year and the 21st of her career.

=== Doubles ===
(France) Françoise Dürr / (Netherlands) Betty Stöve defeated (United States) Mona Schallau / (United States) Pam Teeguarden 7–5, 7–5

== Prize money ==
Event	W	F	3rd	4th	QF	Round of 16	Round of 32
Singles	$7,000	$3,500	$1,950	$1,650	$900	$450	$225
