= 1974 Virginia Slims of Washington =

- Date: January 28 – February 3
- Edition: 3rd
- Category: Virginia Slims circuit
- Draw: 32S / 8D
- Prize money: $50,000
- Surface: Carpet (Sporteze) / indoor
- Location: Fairfax, Virginia, U.S.
- Venue: James Robinson School Field House

Champions

Singles
- (United States) Billie Jean King

Doubles
- (United States) Billie Jean King / (Netherlands) Betty Stöve
← 1973 ·	Virginia Slims of Washington	· 1975 →

The 1974 Virginia Slims of Washington was a women's tennis tournament played on indoor carpet courts at the James Robinson School Field House in Fairfax, Virginia in the United States that was part of the 1974 Virginia Slims World Championship Series. It was the third edition of the tournament and was held from January 28 through February 3, 1974. First-seeded Billie Jean King won the singles title and earned $10,000 first-prize money.

== Finals ==
=== Singles ===
(United States) Billie Jean King defeated (Australia) Kerry Melville 6–0, 6–2

=== Doubles ===
(United States) Billie Jean King / (Netherlands) Betty Stöve defeated (France) Françoise Dürr / (Australia) Kerry Harris 6–3, 6–4

== Prize money ==
Event	W	F	3rd	4th	QF	Round of 16	Round of 32
Singles	$10,000	$5,600	$3,000	$2,600	$1,400	$700	$350
