= 1972 Caribe Hilton Invitational =

Puerto Rican tennis tournament

- Date: March 27 – April 2
- Edition: 2nd
- Category: VS Circuit
- Draw: 32S / 16D
- Prize money: $18,000
- Surface: Hard / outdoor
- Location: San Juan, Puerto Rico
- Venue: Caribe Hilton Hotel

Champions

Singles
- (United States) Nancy Gunter

Doubles
- (United States) Rosemary Casals / (United States) Billie Jean King
← 1971 ·	Caribe Hilton Invitational	· 1973 →

The 1972 Caribe Hilton Invitational was a women's tennis tournament played on outdoor hard courts at the Caribe Hilton Hotel in San Juan, Puerto Rico that was part of the 1972 Women's Tennis Circuit. It was the second edition of the tournament in the open era and was held from March 27 through April 2, 1972. Third-seeded Nancy Gunter won the singles title and earned $3,500 first-prize money.

== Finals ==
=== Singles ===
(United States) Nancy Gunter defeated (United States) Chris Evert 6–1, 6–3

=== Doubles ===
(United States) Rosemary Casals / (United States) Billie Jean King defeated (Australia) Karen Krantzcke / (Australia) Judy Tegart-Dalton 6–2, 6–3
