= 1972 Virginia Slims of Indianapolis =

- Date: May 3–6
- Edition: 1st
- Category: Virginia Slims Circuit
- Draw: 16S / 8D
- Prize money: $20,000
- Surface: Carpet (Sportface) / indoor
- Location: Indianapolis, Indiana, U.S.
- Venue: Indiana State Fairgrounds Coliseum
- Attendance: ~3,000

Champions

Singles
- (United States) Billie Jean King

Doubles
- (United States) Rosemary Casals (Australia) Karen Krantzcke
Virginia Slims of Indianapolis	· 1973 →

The 1972 Virginia Slims of Indianapolis was a women's tennis tournament played on indoor carpet courts at the Indiana State Fairgrounds Coliseum in Indianapolis, Indiana in the United States that was part of the 1972 Virginia Slims Circuit. It was the inaugural edition of the tournament and was held from May 3 through May 6, 1972. The qualifying event for the singles competition took place on May 1 and May 2, 1972, at the Indianapolis Racquet Club. First-seeded Billie Jean King won the singles title and earned $4,000 first-prize money.

== Finals ==
=== Singles ===
(United States) Billie Jean King defeated (United States) Nancy Gunter 6–3, 6–3

=== Doubles ===
(United States) Rosemary Casals / (Australia) Karen Krantzcke defeated (Australia) Judy Dalton / (France) Françoise Dürr 6–3, 6–2

== Prize money ==
Event	W	F	3rd	4th	QF	Round of 16
Singles	$4,000	$2,600	$1,800	$1,500	$750	$400
