= 1973 Virginia Slims of Chicago =

- Date: March 8–11
- Edition: 2nd
- Category: Virginia Slims circuit
- Draw: 16S
- Prize money: $30,000
- Surface: Carpet (Sporteze) / indoor
- Location: Chicago, Illinois, U.S.
- Venue: Lake Shore Racquet Club

Champions

Singles
- (Australia) Margaret Court

Doubles
- (United States) Rosie Casals / (United States) Billie Jean King
- Virginia Slims of Chicago

The 1973 Virginia Slims of Chicago was a women's tennis tournament played on indoor carpet courts at the Lake Shore Racquet Club in Chicago, Illinois in the United States that was part of the 1973 Virginia Slims World Championship Series. It was the second edition of the tournament and was held from March 8 through March 11, 1973. First-seeded Margaret Court won the singles title and earned $6,500 first-prize money.

== Finals ==
=== Singles ===
(Australia) Margaret Court defeated (United States) Billie Jean King 6–2, 4–6, 6–4

=== Doubles ===
(United States) Rosie Casals / (United States) Billie Jean King defeated (Australia) Karen Krantzcke / (Netherlands) Betty Stöve 6–4, 6–2

== Prize money ==
Event	W	F	3rd	4th	QF	Round of 16
Singles	$6,500	$3,500	$1,950	$1,650	$1,000	$550
