= 1973 Barnett Bank Classic =

- Date: February 6–11
- Edition: 2nd
- Category: Virginia Slims circuit
- Draw: 32S / ?D
- Prize money: $30,000
- Surface: Hard (Softturf) / outdoor
- Location: Miami, Florida, U.S.
- Venue: Miami Jockey Club

Champions

Singles
- (Australia) Margaret Court

Doubles
- (France) Françoise Dürr / (Netherlands) Betty Stöve
← 1972 ·	Barnett Bank Classic	· 1974 →

The 1973 Barnett Bank Classic was a women's tennis tournament played on outdoor hard courts at the Miami Jockey Club in Miami, Florida in the United States that was part of the 1973 Virginia Slims World Championship Series. It was the second edition of the tournament and was held from February 6 through February 11, 1973. Second-seeded Margaret Court won the singles title and earned $7,000 first-prize money.

== Finals ==
=== Singles ===
(Australia) Margaret Court defeated (Australia) Kerry Melville 4–6, 6–1, 7–5

=== Doubles ===
(France) Françoise Dürr / (Netherlands) Betty Stöve defeated (United States) Rosie Casals / (United States) Billie Jean King 4–6, 6–2, 6–3
