= 1971 Virginia Slims Masters =

- Date: April 5–11
- Edition: 1st
- Category: WT Woman's Pro Tour
- Draw: 16S / 11D
- Prize money: $10,000
- Surface: Clay (Green) / outdoor
- Location: St. Petersburg, Florida, U.S.
- Venue: Bartlett Park Tennis Center

Champions

Singles
- (United States) Chris Evert

Doubles
- (France) Françoise Dürr / (United Kingdom) Ann Haydon-Jones
Eckerd Open	· 1972 →

The 1971 Virginia Slims Masters was a women's singles tennis tournament played on outdoor clay court at the Bartlett Park Tennis Center in St. Petersburg, Florida in the United States. The event was part of the 1971 WT Woman's Pro Tour. It was the inaugural edition of the tournament and was held from April 5 through April 11, 1971. Chris Evert won the singles title, defeating Julie Heldman. Evert was not entitled to the $2,000 first-prize money due to her amateur status.

== Finals ==
=== Singles ===
(United States) Chris Evert defeated (United States) Julie Heldman 6–1, 6–2

- It was Evert's second singles title of the year and of her career.

=== Doubles ===
(France) Françoise Dürr / (United Kingdom) Ann Haydon-Jones defeated (Australia) Judy Tegart Dalton / (United States) Julie Heldman 7–6, 3–6, 6–3

== Prize money ==
Event	W	F	SF	QF	Round of 16
Singles	$2,000	$1,200	$800	$500	$300
