= 1973 Virginia Slims of Indianapolis =

- Date: February 22–26
- Edition: 2nd
- Category: Virginia Slims Circuit
- Draw: 32S / 16D
- Prize money: $25,000
- Surface: Hard / indoor
- Location: Indianapolis, Indiana, U.S.
- Venue: Convention-Expo Center
- Attendance: ~5,000

Champions

Singles
- (United States) Billie Jean King

Doubles
- (United States) Rosemary Casals (United States) Janet Young
← 1972 ·	Virginia Slims of Indianapolis	· 1983 →

The 1973 Virginia Slims of Indianapolis was a women's tennis tournament played on indoor hardcourts at the Convention-Expo Center in Indianapolis, Indiana in the United States that was part of the 1973 Virginia Slims Circuit. It was the second edition of the tournament and was held from February 22 through February 26, 1973. Third-seeded Billie Jean King won the singles title and earned $6,000 first-prize money. In the semifinal King, coming back from a three months break, saved three match points against Margaret Court and ended Court's 12-tournament 54-match winning streak.

== Finals ==
=== Singles ===
(United States) Billie Jean King defeated (United States) Rosemary Casals 5–7, 6–2, 6–4

=== Doubles ===
(United States) Rosemary Casals / (United States) Billie Jean King defeated (Australia) Margaret Court / (Australia) Lesley Hunt 7–5, 6–4

== Prize money ==
Event	W	F	3rd	4th	QF	Round of 16
Singles	$6,000	$3,000	$1,950	$1,600	$1,000	?
