= Virginia Slims of Columbus =

Defunct tennis tournament
- Event name: Virginia Slims of Columbus
- Tour: WTA Tour
- Founded: 1972
- Abolished: 1973
- Editions: 2
- Location: Columbus, Georgia
- Surface: Clay / outdoor

The Virginia Slims of Columbus is a defunct WTA Tour affiliated women's tennis tournament played from 1972 to 1973. It was held in Columbus, Georgia in the United States and played on outdoor clay courts.

== Past finals ==
=== Singles ===
Year	Champions	Runners-up	Score
1972	(United States) Rosemary Casals	(France) Françoise Dürr	6–7^{(2–5)}, 7–6^{(5–0)}, 6–0
1973	(United States) Chris Evert	(Australia) Margaret Court	Walkover

=== Doubles ===
Year	Champions	Runners-up	Score
1972	(France) Françoise Dürr (Australia) Helen Gourlay	(Australia) Kerry Harris (Australia) Kerry Reid	6–4, 6–3
1973	(France) Françoise Dürr (Netherlands) Betty Stöve	(United States) Mona Guerrant (United States) Pam Teeguarden	7–5, 7–5
