= Virginia Slims of St. Louis =

Defunct tennis tournament
- Event name: Virginia Slims of St. Louis
- Tour: WTA Tour
- Founded: 1973
- Abolished: 1973
- Surface: Hard

The Virginia Slims of St. Louis is a defunct WTA Tour affiliated tennis tournament played in 1973. It was held in St. Louis, Missouri in the United States and played on outdoor hard courts.

== Past finals ==
=== Singles ===
Year	Champions	Runners-up	Score
1973	(United States) Rosemary Casals	(Australia) Karen Krantzcke	6–4, 6–7, 6–0

=== Doubles ===
Year	Champions	Runners-up	Score
1973	(United States) Mona Guerrant (Australia) Karen Krantzcke	(Netherlands) Betty Stöve (United States) Pam Teeguarden	6–4, 7–6
