= 1973 Virginia Slims Championships – Singles =

Singles
- 1973 Virginia Slims Championships

Final
- Champion: (United States) Chris Evert
- Runner-up: (United States) Nancy Richey
- Score: 6–3, 6–3

Details
- Draw: 8

Events
Singles	Doubles
← 1972 ·	Virginia Slims Championships	· 1974 →

Defending champion Chris Evert successfully defended her title, defeating Nancy Richey in the final, 6–3, 6–3 to win the singles tennis title at the 1973 Virginia Slims Championships.

Both the top two qualifying players, Margaret Court and Billie Jean King, withdrew from the tournament due to injury, although Court did compete (and win) in the doubles event. Fourth ranked Evonne Goolagong also defaulted.

== Seeds ==
1. (United States) Chris Evert (champion)
2. (United States) Mona Guerrant (quarterfinals)
3. (United States) Janet Newberry (quarterfinals)
4. (United States) Nancy Richey (final)
5. (Australia) Kerry Melville (semifinals)
6. (United Kingdom) Virginia Wade (quarterfinals)
7. (United States) Julie Heldman (quarterfinals)
8. (France) Françoise Dürr (semifinals)

== Draw ==
=== Key ===
- Q = Qualifier
- WC = Wild card
- LL = Lucky loser
- Alt = Alternate
- SE = Special exempt
- PR = Protected ranking
- ITF = ITF entry
- JE = Junior exempt
- w/o = Walkover
- r = Retired
- d = Defaulted
- SR = Special ranking

=== Draw ===
Quarterfinals
1	(United States) Chris Evert	6	6
7	(United States) Julie Heldman	0	1
5	(Australia) Kerry Melville	6	7
2	(United States) Mona Guerrant	3	5
4	(United States) Nancy Richey	6	5	7
6	(United Kingdom) Virginia Wade	4	7	5
8	(France) Françoise Dürr	6	6
3	(United States) Janet Newberry	2	4

Semifinals
1	(United States) Chris Evert	6	6
5	(Australia) Kerry Melville	1	2
4	(United States) Nancy Richey	6	6
8	(France) Françoise Dürr	2	1

Final
1	(United States) Chris Evert	6	6
4	(United States) Nancy Richey	3	3
