= 1973 Virginia Slims of Washington =

- Date: January 29 – February 4
- Edition: 2nd
- Category: Virginia Slims circuit
- Draw: 32S / 8D
- Prize money: $25,000
- Surface: Carpet (Sporteze) / indoor
- Location: Bethesda, Maryland, U.S.
- Venue: Linden Hill Racquet Club

Champions

Singles
- (Australia) Margaret Court

Doubles
- (United States) Rosie Casals / (United States) Julie Heldman
← 1972 ·	Virginia Slims of Washington	· 1974 →

The 1973 Virginia Slims of Washington was a women's tennis tournament played on indoor carpet courts at the Linden Hill Racquet Club in Bethesda, Maryland in the United States that was part of the 1973 Virginia Slims World Championship Series. It was the second edition of the tournament and was held from January 29 through February 4, 1973. First-seeded Margaret Court won the singles title and earned $10,000 first-prize money.

== Finals ==
=== Singles ===
(Australia) Margaret Court defeated (Australia) Kerry Melville 6–1, 6–2

=== Doubles ===
(United States) Rosie Casals / (United States) Julie Heldman defeated (Australia) Kerry Harris / (Australia) Kerry Melville 6–3, 6–3

== Prize money ==
Event	W	F	3rd	4th	QF	Round of 16	Round of 32
Singles	$6,000	$3,000	$1,950	$1,650	$1,000	$550	$175
