= Tucson Open (tennis) =

WTA tour event (1972 to 1973)

Defunct tennis tournament
- Event name: Virginia Slims Conquistadores (1972); Virginia Slims of Tucson (1973); L'EGGS World Series of Tennis Tucson (1977); Avon Futures of Tucson (1978); Tucson Open (1980)
- Tour: WTA Tour
- Founded: 1972
- Abolished: 1980
- Editions: 5
- Surface: Hard / outdoor (1972-78); Carpet / indoor (1980)

The Tucson Open is a defunct WTA Tour affiliated tennis tournament founded in 1972 as the Virginia Slims Conquistadores it ran annually with breaks until 1980. From 1972 to 1978 it's was played at the Tucson Racquet & Swim Club, Tucson, Arizona in the United States and mainly played on outdoor hard courts, except for the 1980 edition that was played on indoor carpet courts at the Tucson Convention Centre Arena.

This event was the successor women's tournament to the combined men's and women's event called the Tucson Racquet Club Invitational (1967-1971).

== Past finals ==
=== Singles ===
Year	Champions	Runners-up	Score
1972	(United States) Billie Jean King	(France) Françoise Dürr	6–0, 6–3
1973	(Australia) Kerry Reid	(United States) Nancy Richey	6–3, 6–3
1977	(United States) Chris Evert	(United States) Martina Navratilova	6–3, 7–6
1978	(South Africa) Brigitte Cuypers	(United States) Sharon Walsh	6–2, 2–6, 6-3
1980	(United States) Tracy Austin	(United States) Peanut Louie	6–2, 6-0

=== Doubles ===
Year	Champions	Runners-up	Score
1972	(Australia) Kerry Harris (Australia) Karen Krantzcke	(France) Françoise Dürr (Australia) Judy Tegart	6–3, 6–7, 6–3
1973	(United States) Janet Newberry (United States) Pam Teeguarden	(Australia) Karen Krantzcke (Netherlands) Betty Stöve	3–6, 7–6, 7–5

== Event names ==
Sponsored & Official

- Virginia Slims Conquistadores (1972)
- Virginia Slims of Tucson (1973)
- L'EGGS World Series of Tennis Tucson (1977)
- Avon Futures of Tucson (1978)
- Tucson Open (1980)

Tour

- WTA Tucson (1973-78)
- WTA Tucson Open (1980)

== Sources ==
- WTA Results Archive
