= Virginia Slims of Jacksonville =

Defunct tennis tournament
- Event name: Virginia Slims of Jacksonville
- Tour: Virginia Slims Circuit
- Founded: 1972
- Abolished: 1973
- Editions: 2
- Surface: Clay / outdoor

The Virginia Slims of Jacksonville (its sponsorship name) or Jacksonville Invitation its official name is a defunct WTA Tour affiliated women's tennis tournament played from 1972 to 1973. It was held in Jacksonville, Florida in the United States and played on outdoor clay courts.

== History ==
In 1961 the Jacksonville Invitation was established as a men's tournament played on outdoor hard courts. That tournament became known as the Jacksonville Open. This tournament was established in 1972 as the Jacksonville Invitation for women an outdoor clay court event. Virginia Slims of Jacksonville was the sponsorship name of this tournament.

This event was succeeded and replaced by the Virginia Slims of Florida.

== Past finals ==
=== Singles ===
Year	Champions	Runners-up	Score
1972	(Czechoslovakia) Marie Neumannová	(United States) Billie Jean King	6–4, 6–3
1973	(Australia) Margaret Court'	(United States) Rosemary Casals	5–7, 6–3, 6–1

=== Doubles ===
Year	Champions	Runners-up	Score
1972	(Australia) Judy Tegart (Australia) Karen Krantzcke	(Canada) Vicki Berner (United States) Billie Jean King	7–5, 6–1
1973	(United States) Rosemary Casals (United States) Billie Jean King	(France) Françoise Dürr (Netherlands) Betty Stöve	7–6, 5–7, 6–3
