= Wendy Overton =

American tennis player

- Country (sports): United States
- Born: March 31, 1947 (age 78); Glen Cove, New York, USA

Singles
- Career record: 18–28

Doubles
- Career record: 16–25
- Career titles: 5
- Highest ranking: No. 4 (1975)

Wendy Overton (born March 31, 1947) is an American former professional tennis player active in the 1970s. She is known mostly for her performance in doubles.

She began her tennis career in Florida at the age of 11. She was ranked world No. 1 in juniors and won several US National titles in both singles and doubles.

She attended Rollins College in Winter Park, Florida on an academic scholarship and was a top-ranked collegiate player from 1965 to 1969.

She participated in World TeamTennis and played for Toronto, Cleveland, and Indiana.

An arm injury ended her career.

After her retirement, she became tennis director of the Hunters Run Golf and Racket Club in Boynton Beach, Florida, a post she held for 10 years. She then became a real estate agent. She won the US Open senior event in 1997.

== WTA Tour finals ==
=== Doubles 9 (5 titles, 4 runner-ups) ===
Legend
Grand Slam	0
WTA Championships	0
Tier I	0
Tier II	0
Tier III	0
Tier IV & V	0

Titles by surface
Hard	1
Clay	2
Grass	0
Carpet	2

Result	No.	Date	Tournament	Surface	Partner	Opponents	Score
Win	1.	February 20. 1972	Washington, D.C., US	Carpet	(United States) Valerie Ziegenfuss	(Australia) Judy Tegart Dalton (France) Françoise Dürr	7–5, 6–2
Win	2.	April 11, 1972	St. Petersburg, Florida, US	Clay	(Australia) Karen Krantzcke	(Australia) Judy Tegart Dalton (France) Françoise Dürr	7–5, 6–4
Loss	3.	June 5, 1972	Hamburg, West Germany	Clay	(United States) Valerie Ziegenfuss	(West Germany) Helga Masthoff (West Germany) Heide Orth	6–3, 6–2, 0–6
Win	4.	September 25, 1972	Phoenix, Arizona, US	Hard	(United States) Rosie Casals	(France) Françoise Dürr (Netherlands) Betty Stöve	4–6, 7–5, 6–2
Loss	5.	January 15, 1973	San Francisco, California, US	Hard	(United States) Valerie Ziegenfuss	(Australia) Margaret Court (Australia) Lesley Hunt	1–6, 5–7
Win	6.	September 30, 1974	Houston, Texas, US	Carpet	(United States) Janet Newberry	(United States) Sue Stap (United Kingdom) Virginia Wade	4–6, 7–5, 6–2
Win	7.	October 13, 1975	Orlando, Florida, US	Clay	(United States) Rosie Casals	(United States) Chris Evert (Czechoslovakia) Martina Navratilova	W/O
Loss	8.	January 19, 1976	Washington, D.C., US	Hard	(United States) Mona Guerrant	(Soviet Union) Olga Morozova (United Kingdom) Virginia Wade	7–6^{(5–2)}, 6–2
Loss	9.	August 8, 1977	Indianapolis, Indiana, US	Clay	(United States) Mary Carillo	(South Africa) Linky Boshoff (South Africa) Ilana Kloss	7–5, 5–7, 3–6
