= 1974 WTA Tour =

Women's tennis circuit

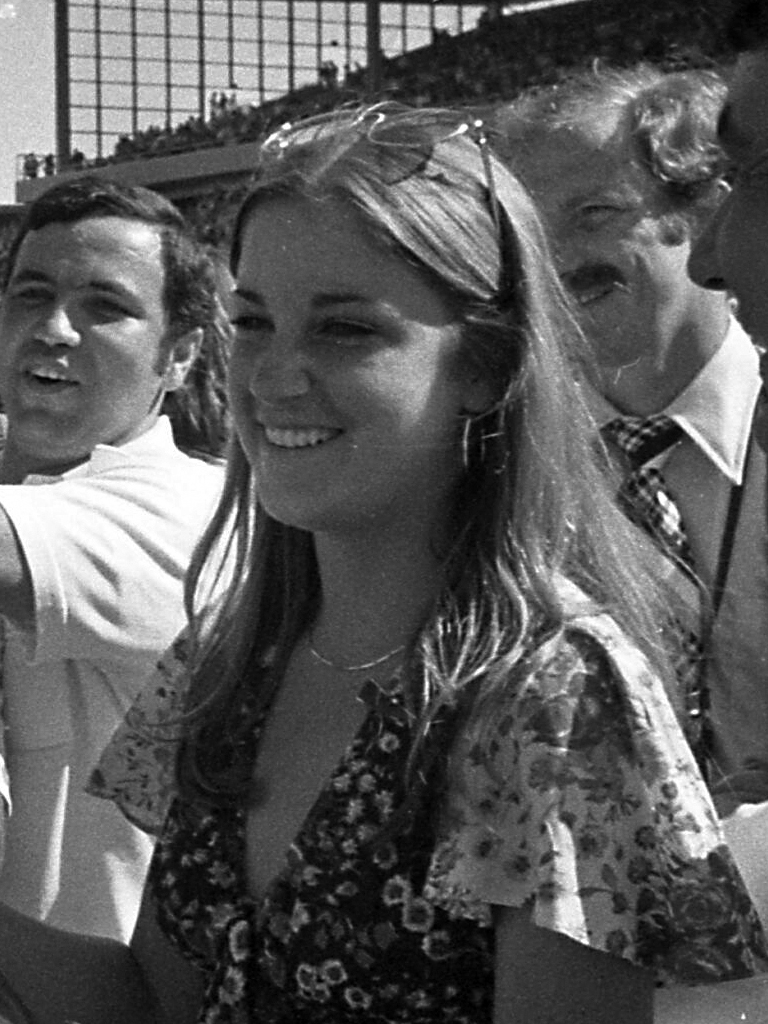
- Chris Evert won 16 tour singles titles during the season.

Details
- Duration: 26 December 1973 – 23 December 1974
- Edition: 2nd
- Tournaments: 51
- Categories: Grand Slam (4); Virginia Slims championships Virginia Slims Circuit (17); Women's International Circuit (8); Non-Tour Events (19)

Achievements (singles)
- Most titles: (United States) Chris Evert (16)
- Most finals: (United States) Chris Evert (21)
- Prize money leader: (United States) Chris Evert ($261,460)

The 1974 WTA Tour was composed of the fourth annual Virginia Slims Circuit and Women's International Grand Prix, a tour of tennis tournaments for female tennis players, sponsored by Virginia Slims cigarettes. The WTA signed their first television broadcast contract in 1974, with the broadcasting network CBS with Brent Musburger announcing.

== Schedule ==
This is a calendar of all events sponsored by Virginia Slims in the year 1974, with player progression documented from the quarterfinals stage. The table also includes the Grand Slam tournaments, the 1974 Virginia Slims Championships and the 1974 Federation Cup.

Key

Grand Slam tournaments
Virginia Slims championships
Virginia Slims Circuit
Women's International Circuit
Non-tour event
Team events

=== December (1973) ===
Week	Tournament	Champions	Runners-up	Semifinalists	Quarterfinalists
24 Dec; 31 Dec	Australian Open; Melbourne, Australia; Grand Slam; Grass – 56S/32D; Singles – Doubles	(Australia) Evonne Goolagong; 7–6^{(7–5)}, 4–6, 6–0	(United States) Chris Evert	(United States) Julie Heldman (Australia) Kerry Melville	(United States) Janet Newberry (Australia) Lesley Hunt (Australia) Judy Dalton (Australia) Karen Krantzcke
24 Dec; 31 Dec	Australian Open; Melbourne, Australia; Grand Slam; Grass – 56S/32D; Singles – Doubles	(Australia) Evonne Goolagong (United States) Peggy Michel; 7–5, 6–3	(Australia) Kerry Harris (Australia) Kerry Melville	(United States) Julie Heldman (Australia) Kerry Melville	(United States) Janet Newberry (Australia) Lesley Hunt (Australia) Judy Dalton (Australia) Karen Krantzcke

=== January ===
Week	Tournament	Champions	Runners-up	Semifinalists	Quarterfinalists
1 Jan	New South Wales Open; Sydney, Australia; Women's International Circuit; Clay	(Australia) Karen Krantzcke; 6–2, 6–3	(Australia) Evonne Goolagong		
1 Jan	New South Wales Open; Sydney, Australia; Women's International Circuit; Clay	(United States) Ann Kiyomura (Japan) Kazuko Sawamatsu; 6–3, 6–3	(Australia) Janet Fallis (Australia) Pam Whytcross		
14 Jan	Virginia Slims of San Francisco; San Francisco, United States; Virginia Slims $50,000	(United States) Billie Jean King; 7–6^{(5–2)}, 6–2	(United States) Chris Evert	(Australia) Kerry Melville (United States) Nancy Gunter	(United States) Laurie Fleming (United States) Janet Newberry (United States) Rosie Casals (United States) Wendy Overton
14 Jan	Virginia Slims of San Francisco; San Francisco, United States; Virginia Slims $50,000	(United States) Chris Evert (United States) Billie Jean King; 6–4, 6–2	(France) Françoise Dürr (Netherlands) Betty Stöve	(Australia) Kerry Melville (United States) Nancy Gunter	(United States) Laurie Fleming (United States) Janet Newberry (United States) Rosie Casals (United States) Wendy Overton
21 Jan	Virginia Slims of Mission Viejo; Mission Viejo, United States; Virginia Slims $50,000	(United States) Chris Evert; 6–3, 6–1	(United States) Billie Jean King	(Australia) Kerry Melville (United States) Nancy Gunter	(United States) Barbara Downs (France) Françoise Dürr (United States) Rosie Casals (United States) Kristien Kemmer
21 Jan	Virginia Slims of Mission Viejo; Mission Viejo, United States; Virginia Slims $50,000	(Australia) Kerry Harris (Australia) Lesley Hunt; 7–5, 6–4	(United States) Chris Evert (United States) Billie Jean King	(Australia) Kerry Melville (United States) Nancy Gunter	(United States) Barbara Downs (France) Françoise Dürr (United States) Rosie Casals (United States) Kristien Kemmer
28 Jan	Virginia Slims of Washington; Washington, D.C., United States; Virginia Slims; Carpet (i) – $50,000 – 32S / 8D	(United States) Billie Jean King; 6–0, 6–2	(Australia) Kerry Melville	(United States) Rosie Casals (Australia) Helen Gourlay	(United States) Kathy Kuykendall (France) Françoise Dürr (United States) Peaches Bartkowicz (United States) Mona Schallau
28 Jan	Virginia Slims of Washington; Washington, D.C., United States; Virginia Slims; Carpet (i) – $50,000 – 32S / 8D	(United States) Billie Jean King (Netherlands) Betty Stöve; 6–1, 6–7, 7–5	(France) Françoise Dürr (Australia) Kerry Harris	(United States) Rosie Casals (Australia) Helen Gourlay	(United States) Kathy Kuykendall (France) Françoise Dürr (United States) Peaches Bartkowicz (United States) Mona Schallau

=== February ===
Week	Tournament	Champions	Runners-up	Semifinalists	Quarterfinalists
4 Feb	S&H Tennis Classic; Fort Lauderdale, United States; Virginia Slims; Clay – $50,000– 32S / 16D	(United States) Chris Evert; Walkover	(Australia) Kerry Melville	(United States) Rosie Casals (United States) Nancy Gunter	(Netherlands) Betty Stöve (France) Françoise Dürr (Colombia) Isa Fernández (United States) Kathy Kuykendall
4 Feb	S&H Tennis Classic; Fort Lauderdale, United States; Virginia Slims; Clay – $50,000– 32S / 16D	(France) Françoise Dürr (Netherlands) Betty Stöve; 6–3, 6–2	(United States) Patti Hogan (United States) Sharon Walsh	(United States) Rosie Casals (United States) Nancy Gunter	(Netherlands) Betty Stöve (France) Françoise Dürr (Colombia) Isa Fernández (United States) Kathy Kuykendall
18 Feb	Virginia Slims of Detroit; Detroit, United States; Virginia Slims; Carpet (i) – $50,000– 32S / 16D	(United States) Billie Jean King; 6–1, 6–1	(United States) Rosie Casals	(France) Françoise Dürr (United Kingdom) Virginia Wade	(Australia) Lesley Hunt (United States) Valerie Ziegenfuss (United States) Kristien Kemmer (United States) Marcie Louie
18 Feb	Virginia Slims of Detroit; Detroit, United States; Virginia Slims; Carpet (i) – $50,000– 32S / 16D	(United States) Rosie Casals (United States) Billie Jean King; 2–6, 6–4, 7–5	(France) Françoise Dürr (Netherlands) Betty Stöve	(France) Françoise Dürr (United Kingdom) Virginia Wade	(Australia) Lesley Hunt (United States) Valerie Ziegenfuss (United States) Kristien Kemmer (United States) Marcie Louie
25 Feb	Virginia Slims of Chicago; Chicago, United States; Virginia Slims $50,000	(United Kingdom) Virginia Wade; 2–6, 6–4, 6–4	(United States) Rosie Casals	(United States) Billie Jean King (United States) Chris Evert	(United States) Laura duPont (Australia) Lesley Hunt (United States) Valerie Ziegenfuss (Netherlands) Betty Stöve
25 Feb	Virginia Slims of Chicago; Chicago, United States; Virginia Slims $50,000	(United States) Chris Evert (United States) Billie Jean King; 3–6, 6–4, 6–4	(France) Françoise Dürr (Netherlands) Betty Stöve	(United States) Billie Jean King (United States) Chris Evert	(United States) Laura duPont (Australia) Lesley Hunt (United States) Valerie Ziegenfuss (Netherlands) Betty Stöve

=== March ===
Week	Tournament	Champions	Runners-up	Semifinalists	Quarterfinalists
4 Mar	Maureen Connolly Brinker International; Dallas, United States; Virginia Slims $50,000	(United States) Chris Evert; 7–5, 6–2	(United Kingdom) Virginia Wade	(France) Françoise Dürr (United States) Nancy Gunter	(Australia) Lesley Hunt (United States) Rosie Casals (Australia) Karen Krantzcke (United States) Janet Newberry
4 Mar	Maureen Connolly Brinker International; Dallas, United States; Virginia Slims $50,000	(Colombia) Isa Fernández (Czechoslovakia) Martina Navratilova; 6–3, 3–6, 6–3	(United Kingdom) Virginia Wade (Australia) Karen Krantzcke	(France) Françoise Dürr (United States) Nancy Gunter	(Australia) Lesley Hunt (United States) Rosie Casals (Australia) Karen Krantzcke (United States) Janet Newberry
18 Mar	Akron Open; Akron, United States; Virginia Slims $50,000	(United States) Billie Jean King; 6–3, 7–5	(United States) Nancy Gunter	(Soviet Union) Olga Morozova (United States) Pam Teeguarden	(United States) Julie Heldman (United States) Rosie Casals (Czechoslovakia) Martina Navratilova (United States) Sharon Walsh
18 Mar	Akron Open; Akron, United States; Virginia Slims $50,000	(United States) Rosie Casals (United States) Billie Jean King; 6–2, 6–4	(United States) Julie Heldman (Soviet Union) Olga Morozova	(Soviet Union) Olga Morozova (United States) Pam Teeguarden	(United States) Julie Heldman (United States) Rosie Casals (Czechoslovakia) Martina Navratilova (United States) Sharon Walsh
25 Mar	S&H National Indoor Championship; New York City, United States; Virginia Slims $60,000	(United States) Billie Jean King; 6–3, 3–6, 6–2	(United States) Chris Evert	(United States) Rosie Casals (Netherlands) Betty Stöve	(United States) Julie Heldman (France) Françoise Dürr (United Kingdom) Virginia Wade (United States) Marcie Louie

=== April ===
Week	Tournament	Champions	Runners-up	Semifinalists	Quarterfinalists
8 Apr	First Federal of Sarasota Classic; Sarasota, United States; Virginia Slims $50,000	(United States) Chris Evert; 6–4, 6–0	(Australia) Evonne Goolagong	(Soviet Union) Olga Morozova (Australia) Kerry Melville	(Netherlands) Betty Stöve (United States) Julie Heldman (South Africa) Ilana Kloss (Australia) Helen Gourlay
8 Apr	First Federal of Sarasota Classic; Sarasota, United States; Virginia Slims $50,000	(United States) Chris Evert (Australia) Evonne Goolagong; 6–2, 6–2	(United States) Tory Fretz (United States) Ceci Martinez	(Soviet Union) Olga Morozova (Australia) Kerry Melville	(Netherlands) Betty Stöve (United States) Julie Heldman (South Africa) Ilana Kloss (Australia) Helen Gourlay
15 Apr	Barnett Bank Masters; St. Petersburg, United States; Virginia Slims $45,000	(United States) Chris Evert; 6–0, 6–1	(Australia) Kerry Melville	(West Germany) Helga Masthoff (Australia) Evonne Goolagong	(Australia) Karen Krantzcke (Soviet Union) Olga Morozova (Australia) Helen Gourlay (Netherlands) Betty Stöve
15 Apr	Barnett Bank Masters; St. Petersburg, United States; Virginia Slims $45,000	(Soviet Union) Olga Morozova (Netherlands) Betty Stöve; 6–4, 6–2	(United States) Chris Evert (Australia) Evonne Goolagong	(West Germany) Helga Masthoff (Australia) Evonne Goolagong	(Australia) Karen Krantzcke (Soviet Union) Olga Morozova (Australia) Helen Gourlay (Netherlands) Betty Stöve
22 Apr	Virginia Slims of Philadelphia; Philadelphia, United States; Virginia Slims $50,000; Singles – Doubles	(Soviet Union) Olga Morozova; 7–6^{(5–2)}, 6–1	(United States) Billie Jean King	(United Kingdom) Virginia Wade (United States) Rosie Casals	(United States) Janet Newberry (United Kingdom) Glynis Coles (Australia) Kerry Melville (Australia) Helen Gourlay
22 Apr	Virginia Slims of Philadelphia; Philadelphia, United States; Virginia Slims $50,000; Singles – Doubles	(United States) Rosie Casals (United States) Billie Jean King; 6–3, 7–6	(Australia) Kerry Harris (Australia) Lesley Hunt	(United Kingdom) Virginia Wade (United States) Rosie Casals	(United States) Janet Newberry (United Kingdom) Glynis Coles (Australia) Kerry Melville (Australia) Helen Gourlay
29 Apr	Family Circle Cup; Hilton Head, United States; Women's International Circuit; Clay	(United States) Chris Evert; 6–1, 6–3	(Australia) Kerry Melville	(United States) Rosie Casals (Australia) Evonne Goolagong	(Netherlands) Betty Stöve (United Kingdom) Virginia Wade (Soviet Union) Olga Morozova (Australia) Karen Krantzcke
29 Apr	Family Circle Cup; Hilton Head, United States; Women's International Circuit; Clay	(Soviet Union) Olga Morozova (United States) Rosie Casals; 6–2, 6–1	(Australia) Karen Krantzcke (Australia) Helen Gourlay	(United States) Rosie Casals (Australia) Evonne Goolagong	(Netherlands) Betty Stöve (United Kingdom) Virginia Wade (Soviet Union) Olga Morozova (Australia) Karen Krantzcke

=== May ===
Week	Tournament	Champions	Runners-up	Semifinalists	Quarterfinalists
13 May	Federation Cup; Naples, Italy; Federation Cup; Clay – 29 teams knockout	Australia; 2–1	United States	Great Britain; West Germany	Italy; South Africa; Romania; France
20 May	German Open; Hamburg, West Germany; Women's International Circuit; Clay	(West Germany) Helga Masthoff; 6–4, 5–7, 6–3	(Czechoslovakia) Martina Navratilova	(Socialist Federal Republic of Yugoslavia) Mima Jaušovec (Japan) Kazuko Sawamatsu	(Czechoslovakia) Marie Neumannová (West Germany) Katja Ebbinghaus (Denmark) Helga Hösl (Netherlands) Marijke Schaar
20 May	German Open; Hamburg, West Germany; Women's International Circuit; Clay	(Denmark) Helga Hösl (Argentina) Raquel Giscafré; 6–3, 6–2	(Czechoslovakia) Martina Navratilova (Czechoslovakia) Renáta Tomanová	(Socialist Federal Republic of Yugoslavia) Mima Jaušovec (Japan) Kazuko Sawamatsu	(Czechoslovakia) Marie Neumannová (West Germany) Katja Ebbinghaus (Denmark) Helga Hösl (Netherlands) Marijke Schaar
20 May	British Hard Court Championships; Bournemouth, United Kingdom; Non-tour event Clay	(United Kingdom) Virginia Wade; 6–1, 3–6, 6–1	(United States) Julie Heldman	(United Kingdom) Jackie Fayter (Australia) Dianne Fromholtz	(United Kingdom) Winnie Wooldridge (United Kingdom) Sue Barker (Australia) Jenny Dimond (United States) Carrie Meyer
20 May	British Hard Court Championships; Bournemouth, United Kingdom; Non-tour event Clay	(United States) Julie Heldman (United Kingdom) Virginia Wade; 6–2, 6–2	(United States) Patti Hogan (United States) Sharon Walsh	(United Kingdom) Jackie Fayter (Australia) Dianne Fromholtz	(United Kingdom) Winnie Wooldridge (United Kingdom) Sue Barker (Australia) Jenny Dimond (United States) Carrie Meyer
27 May	Italian Open; Rome, Italy; Women's International Circuit; Clay	(United States) Chris Evert; 6–3, 6–3	(Czechoslovakia) Martina Navratilova	(South Africa) Pat Pretorius (Soviet Union) Olga Morozova	(United Kingdom) Virginia Wade (West Germany) Helga Masthoff (United States) Julie Heldman (Japan) Kazuko Sawamatsu
27 May	Italian Open; Rome, Italy; Women's International Circuit; Clay	(United States) Chris Evert (Soviet Union) Olga Morozova; Walkover	(West Germany) Helga Masthoff (West Germany) Heide Orth	(South Africa) Pat Pretorius (Soviet Union) Olga Morozova	(United Kingdom) Virginia Wade (West Germany) Helga Masthoff (United States) Julie Heldman (Japan) Kazuko Sawamatsu

=== June ===
Week	Tournament	Champions	Runners-up	Semifinalists	Quarterfinalists
3 Jun; 10 Jun	French Open; Paris, France; Grand Slam; Clay – 64S/64Q/21D/23X; Singles – Doubles – Mixed doubles	(United States) Chris Evert; 6–1, 6–2	(Soviet Union) Olga Morozova	(Argentina) Raquel Giscafré (West Germany) Helga Masthoff	(West Germany) Katja Ebbinghaus (Czechoslovakia) Marie Neumannová (Czechoslovakia) Martina Navratilova (United States) Julie Heldman
3 Jun; 10 Jun	French Open; Paris, France; Grand Slam; Clay – 64S/64Q/21D/23X; Singles – Doubles – Mixed doubles	(United States) Chris Evert (Soviet Union) Olga Morozova; 6–4, 2–6, 6–1	(France) Gail Chanfreau (West Germany) Katja Ebbinghaus	(Argentina) Raquel Giscafré (West Germany) Helga Masthoff	(West Germany) Katja Ebbinghaus (Czechoslovakia) Marie Neumannová (Czechoslovakia) Martina Navratilova (United States) Julie Heldman
3 Jun; 10 Jun	French Open; Paris, France; Grand Slam; Clay – 64S/64Q/21D/23X; Singles – Doubles – Mixed doubles	(Czechoslovakia) Martina Navratilova (Colombia) Iván Molina; 6–3, 6–3	(Mexico) Rosy Darmon (Mexico) Marcelo Lara	(Argentina) Raquel Giscafré (West Germany) Helga Masthoff	(West Germany) Katja Ebbinghaus (Czechoslovakia) Marie Neumannová (Czechoslovakia) Martina Navratilova (United States) Julie Heldman
17 Jun	John Player Tournament; Eastbourne, United Kingdom; Non-tour event Grass	(United States) Chris Evert; 7–5, 6–4	(United Kingdom) Virginia Wade		
17 Jun	John Player Tournament; Eastbourne, United Kingdom; Non-tour event Grass	(Australia) Helen Gourlay (Australia) Karen Krantzcke; 6–2, 6–0	(United States) Chris Evert (Soviet Union) Olga Morozova		
24 Jun; 1 Jul	Wimbledon Championships; London, Great Britain; Grand Slam; Grass – 96S/48D/80X; Singles – Doubles – Mixed doubles	(United States) Chris Evert; 6–0, 6–4	(Soviet Union) Olga Morozova	(United Kingdom) Virginia Wade (Australia) Kerry Melville	(United States) Billie Jean King (South Africa) Linky Boshoff (Australia) Evonne Goolagong (West Germany) Helga Masthoff
24 Jun; 1 Jul	Wimbledon Championships; London, Great Britain; Grand Slam; Grass – 96S/48D/80X; Singles – Doubles – Mixed doubles	(Australia) Evonne Goolagong (United States) Peggy Michel; 2–6, 6–4, 6–3	(Australia) Helen Gourlay (Australia) Karen Krantzcke	(United Kingdom) Virginia Wade (Australia) Kerry Melville	(United States) Billie Jean King (South Africa) Linky Boshoff (Australia) Evonne Goolagong (West Germany) Helga Masthoff
24 Jun; 1 Jul	Wimbledon Championships; London, Great Britain; Grand Slam; Grass – 96S/48D/80X; Singles – Doubles – Mixed doubles	(United States) Billie Jean King (Australia) Owen Davidson; 6–3, 9–7	(United Kingdom) Lesley Charles (United Kingdom) Mark Farrell	(United Kingdom) Virginia Wade (Australia) Kerry Melville	(United States) Billie Jean King (South Africa) Linky Boshoff (Australia) Evonne Goolagong (West Germany) Helga Masthoff

=== July ===
Week	Tournament	Champions	Runners-up	Semifinalists	Quarterfinalists
8 Jul	Swiss Open Championships; Gstaad, Switzerland; Non-tour event Clay	(West Germany) Helga Schultze; 4–6, 6–4, 6–3	(Italy) Lea Pericoli		
8 Jul	Swiss Open Championships; Gstaad, Switzerland; Non-tour event Clay	(West Germany) Helga Schultze (Italy) Lea Pericoli; 6–2, 6–0	(Japan) Kayoko Fukuoka (Chile) Michelle Rodríguez		
8 Jul	Swedish Open Championships; Båstad, Sweden; Non-tour event Clay	(United Kingdom) Sue Barker; 6–1, 7–5	(Netherlands) Marijke Schaar		
8 Jul	Swedish Open Championships; Båstad, Sweden; Non-tour event Clay	(United Kingdom) Sue Barker (United Kingdom) Glynis Coles; 6–2, 6–0	(Uruguay) Fiorella Bonicelli (Italy) Anna-Maria Nasuelli		
15 Jul	Head Cup Austrian Championships; Kitzbühel, Austria; Non-tour event Clay	(Czechoslovakia) Mirka Koželuhová; 6–3, 6–0	(Socialist Federal Republic of Yugoslavia) Mima Jaušovec		
15 Jul	Head Cup Austrian Championships; Kitzbühel, Austria; Non-tour event Clay	(Hungary) Beatrix Klein (Hungary) Éva Szabó; 6–1, 6–4	(Chile) Ana María Arias (West Germany) Iris Riedel		

=== August ===
Week	Tournament	Champions	Runners-up	Semifinalists	Quarterfinalists
5 Aug	US Clay Court Championships; Indianapolis, United States; Women's International Circuit; Clay – $30,000 – 32S/16D; Singles	(United States) Chris Evert; 6–0, 6–0	(France) Gail Chanfreau	(United States) Carrie Meyer (Australia) Dianne Fromholtz	(Romania) Virginia Ruzici (Belgium) Michele Gurdal (United States) Jeanne Evert (United States) Julie Heldman
5 Aug	US Clay Court Championships; Indianapolis, United States; Women's International Circuit; Clay – $30,000 – 32S/16D; Singles	(France) Gail Chanfreau (United States) Julie Heldman; 6–3, 6–1	(United States) Chris Evert (United States) Jeanne Evert	(United States) Carrie Meyer (Australia) Dianne Fromholtz	(Romania) Virginia Ruzici (Belgium) Michele Gurdal (United States) Jeanne Evert (United States) Julie Heldman
12 Aug	Rothmans Canadian Open; Toronto, Canada; Women's International Circuit	(United States) Chris Evert; 6–0, 6–3	(United States) Julie Heldman	(United States) Jeanne Evert (Japan) Kazuko Sawamatsu	(Argentina) Raquel Giscafré (Israel) Paulina Peisachov (Romania) Virginia Ruzici (United States) Laurie Tenney
12 Aug	Rothmans Canadian Open; Toronto, Canada; Women's International Circuit	(France) Gail Chanfreau (United States) Julie Heldman; 6–3, 6–4	(United States) Chris Evert (United States) Jeanne Evert	(United States) Jeanne Evert (Japan) Kazuko Sawamatsu	(Argentina) Raquel Giscafré (Israel) Paulina Peisachov (Romania) Virginia Ruzici (United States) Laurie Tenney
19 Aug	Virginia Slims of Newport; Newport, United States; Virginia Slims; Grass – $30,000	(United States) Chris Evert; 6–4, 6–3	(United States) Betsy Nagelsen	(United States) Julie Heldman (United Kingdom) Virginia Wade	(United States) Janet Newberry (United Kingdom) Lesley Charles (Socialist Federal Republic of Yugoslavia) Mima Jaušovec (Soviet Union) Olga Morozova
19 Aug	Virginia Slims of Newport; Newport, United States; Virginia Slims; Grass – $30,000	(United Kingdom) Lesley Charles (United Kingdom) Sue Mappin; 6–2, 7–5	(France) Gail Chanfreau (United States) Julie Heldman	(United States) Julie Heldman (United Kingdom) Virginia Wade	(United States) Janet Newberry (United Kingdom) Lesley Charles (Socialist Federal Republic of Yugoslavia) Mima Jaušovec (Soviet Union) Olga Morozova
19 Aug	Medi-Quik Open; South Orange, United States; Non-tour event Clay	(United States) Pam Teeguarden; 7–5, 6–3	(Australia) Dianne Fromholtz		
19 Aug	Medi-Quik Open; South Orange, United States; Non-tour event Clay	(United States) Pam Teeguarden (United States) Ann Kiyomura; 6–2, 6–0	(United States) Kathleen Harter (United States) Marita Redondo		
26 Aug; 2 Sept	US Open; New York City, United States; Grand Slam; Clay – 64S/32D/32X; Singles – Doubles – Mixed doubles	(United States) Billie Jean King; 3–6, 6–3, 7–5	(Australia) Evonne Goolagong	(United States) Julie Heldman (United States) Chris Evert	(United States) Rosie Casals (United States) Nancy Gunter (Australia) Kerry Melville (Australia) Lesley Hunt
26 Aug; 2 Sept	US Open; New York City, United States; Grand Slam; Clay – 64S/32D/32X; Singles – Doubles – Mixed doubles	(United States) Rosie Casals (United States) Billie Jean King; 7–6, 6–7, 6–4	(France) Françoise Dürr (Netherlands) Betty Stöve	(United States) Julie Heldman (United States) Chris Evert	(United States) Rosie Casals (United States) Nancy Gunter (Australia) Kerry Melville (Australia) Lesley Hunt
26 Aug; 2 Sept	US Open; New York City, United States; Grand Slam; Clay – 64S/32D/32X; Singles – Doubles – Mixed doubles	(United States) Pam Teeguarden (Australia) Geoff Masters; 6–1, 7–6	(United States) Chris Evert (United States) Jimmy Connors	(United States) Julie Heldman (United States) Chris Evert	(United States) Rosie Casals (United States) Nancy Gunter (Australia) Kerry Melville (Australia) Lesley Hunt

=== September ===
Week	Tournament	Champions	Runners-up	Semifinalists	Quarterfinalists
16 Sep	Barnett Bank Tennis Classic; Orlando, United States; Virginia Slims; Clay – $50,000 – 32S/15D	(Czechoslovakia) Martina Navratilova; 7–6^{(5–4)}, 6–4	(United States) Julie Heldman	(United States) Billie Jean King (France) Françoise Dürr	(United States) Marcie Louie (Netherlands) Betty Stöve (Netherlands) Tine Zwaan (United States) Rosie Casals
16 Sep	Barnett Bank Tennis Classic; Orlando, United States; Virginia Slims; Clay – $50,000 – 32S/15D	(France) Françoise Dürr (Netherlands) Betty Stöve; 6–3, 6–7^{(2–5)}, 6–4	(United States) Rosie Casals (United States) Billie Jean King	(United States) Billie Jean King (France) Françoise Dürr	(United States) Marcie Louie (Netherlands) Betty Stöve (Netherlands) Tine Zwaan (United States) Rosie Casals
16 Sep	Virginia Slims of Denver; Denver, United States; Virginia Slims; Hard (i) – $50,000 – 32S/16D	(Australia) Evonne Goolagong; 7–5, 3–6, 6–4	(United States) Chris Evert	(France) Françoise Dürr (United States) Nancy Gunter	(United States) Valerie Ziegenfuss (United States) Julie Heldman (United States) Pam Teeguarden (United States) Kathy Kuykendall
16 Sep	Virginia Slims of Denver; Denver, United States; Virginia Slims; Hard (i) – $50,000 – 32S/16D	(France) Françoise Dürr (Netherlands) Betty Stöve; 6–2, 7–5	(United States) Mona Schallau (United States) Pam Teeguarden	(France) Françoise Dürr (United States) Nancy Gunter	(United States) Valerie Ziegenfuss (United States) Julie Heldman (United States) Pam Teeguarden (United States) Kathy Kuykendall
30 Sep	Virginia Slims of Houston; Houston, United States; Virginia Slims; Carpet (i) – $50,000 – – 32S/12D	(United States) Chris Evert; 6–3, 5–7, 6–1	(United Kingdom) Virginia Wade	(Australia) Evonne Goolagong (United States) Pam Teeguarden	(United States) Wendy Overton (Australia) Helen Gourlay (United States) Kate Latham (United States) Robin Tenney
30 Sep	Virginia Slims of Houston; Houston, United States; Virginia Slims; Carpet (i) – $50,000 – – 32S/12D	(United States) Janet Newberry (United States) Wendy Overton; 4–6, 7–5, 6–2	(United States) Sue Stap (United Kingdom) Virginia Wade	(Australia) Evonne Goolagong (United States) Pam Teeguarden	(United States) Wendy Overton (Australia) Helen Gourlay (United States) Kate Latham (United States) Robin Tenney

=== October ===
Week	Tournament	Champions	Runners-up	Semifinalists	Quarterfinalists
7 Oct	Virginia Slims of Phoenix; Phoenix, United States; Virginia Slims; Hard – $50,000 – 32S	(United Kingdom) Virginia Wade; 6–1, 6–2	(Australia) Helen Gourlay	(United States) Billie Jean King (Netherlands) Betty Stöve	(United States) Tory Fretz (France) Françoise Dürr (United States) Wendy Overton (United States) Kathy Kuykendall
7 Oct	Virginia Slims of Phoenix; Phoenix, United States; Virginia Slims; Hard – $50,000 – 32S	(France) Françoise Dürr (Netherlands) Betty Stöve; 6–3, 5–7, 6–3	(United States) Mona Schallau (United States) Pam Teeguarden	(United States) Billie Jean King (Netherlands) Betty Stöve	(United States) Tory Fretz (France) Françoise Dürr (United States) Wendy Overton (United States) Kathy Kuykendall
7 Oct	Melia Trophy; Madrid, Spain; Non-tour event Clay	(West Germany) Helga Masthoff; 7–5, 6–3	(Netherlands) Tine Zwaan		
7 Oct	Melia Trophy; Madrid, Spain; Non-tour event Clay	(United Kingdom) Lesley Charles (United Kingdom) Sue Mappin; 6–2 ret.	Creydt (West Germany) Helga Masthoff		
7 Oct	Japan Open; Tokyo, Japan; Non-tour event Hard	(Brazil) Maria Bueno; 3–6, 6–4, 6–3	(West Germany) Katja Ebbinghaus		
7 Oct	Japan Open; Tokyo, Japan; Non-tour event Hard	(United States) Ann Kiyomura (Japan) Kazuko Sawamatsu; 4–6, 6–4, 6–0	(Japan) Kimiyo Yagawara (Australia) Janet Young		
14 Oct	Virginia Slims Championships; Los Angeles, United States; Year-end championships Carpet (i) – $100,000 – 16S/4D	(Australia) Evonne Goolagong; 6–3, 6–4	(United States) Chris Evert	(United Kingdom) Virginia Wade (United States) Billie Jean King	(United States) Rosie Casals (Czechoslovakia) Martina Navratilova (Australia) Lesley Hunt (Australia) Helen Gourlay
14 Oct	Virginia Slims Championships; Los Angeles, United States; Year-end championships Carpet (i) – $100,000 – 16S/4D	(United States) Rosie Casals (United States) Billie Jean King; 6–1, 6–7^{(2–5)}, 7–5	(France) Françoise Dürr (Netherlands) Betty Stöve	(United Kingdom) Virginia Wade (United States) Billie Jean King	(United States) Rosie Casals (Czechoslovakia) Martina Navratilova (Australia) Lesley Hunt (Australia) Helen Gourlay
14 Oct	Melia Trophy; Barcelona, Spain; Non-tour event Clay	(France) Nathalie Fuchs; 7–5, 8–6	(United Kingdom) Glynis Coles		
21 Oct	World Invitational; Hilton Head, United States; Non-tour event Clay	(United States) Chris Evert; 6–1, 6–3	(United Kingdom) Virginia Wade	(Australia) Evonne Goolagong (United States) Billie Jean King	
28 Oct	Dewar Cup Cardiff; Cardiff, United Kingdom; Non-tour event Hard	(United States) Julie Heldman; 6–4, 6–2	(United Kingdom) Glynis Coles		
28 Oct	Dewar Cup Cardiff; Cardiff, United Kingdom; Non-tour event Hard	(United Kingdom) Lesley Charles (United Kingdom) Sue Mappin; 3–6, 6–2, 6–2	(United Kingdom) Jackie Fayter (United Kingdom) Joyce Hume		

=== November ===
Week	Tournament	Champions	Runners-up	Semifinalists	Quarterfinalists
4 Nov	Dewar Cup Edinburgh; Edinburgh, United Kingdom; Non-tour event Hard	(United Kingdom) Virginia Wade; 6–3, 4–6, 6–2	(United States) Julie Heldman		
4 Nov	Dewar Cup Edinburgh; Edinburgh, United Kingdom; Non-tour event Hard	(Socialist Federal Republic of Yugoslavia) Mima Jaušovec (Romania) Virginia Ruzici; 6–4, 4–6, 6–4	(Colombia) Isa Fernández (Argentina) Raquel Giscafré		
11 Nov	Dewar Cup Final; London, United Kingdom; Non-tour event Hard	(United Kingdom) Virginia Wade; 7–6, 6–2	(United States) Julie Heldman		
11 Nov	Dewar Cup Final; London, United Kingdom; Non-tour event Hard	(United Kingdom) Virginia Wade (United States) Sharon Walsh; 6–2, 6–7, 6–2	(United Kingdom) Lesley Charles (United Kingdom) Sue Mappin		
18 Nov	South African Open; Johannesburg, South African; Women's International Circuit	(Australia) Kerry Melville; 6–3, 7–5	(Australia) Dianne Fromholtz		
18 Nov	South American Championships; Buenos Aires, Argentina; Non-tour event Clay; Singles – Doubles	(Argentina) Raquel Giscafré; 7–5, 1–6, 6–2	(Argentina) Beatriz Araujo		
18 Nov	South American Championships; Buenos Aires, Argentina; Non-tour event Clay; Singles – Doubles	(West Germany) Katja Ebbinghaus (West Germany) Helga Masthoff; 6–0, 6–1	(Argentina) Beatriz Araujo (Argentina) Raquel Giscafré		
25 Nov	Queensland State Championships; Victoria, Australia; Non-tour event	(Australia) Evonne Goolagong; 6–1, 6–2	(Australia) Cynthia Doerner	(Belgium) Michele Gurdal (Australia) Wendy Turnbull	(Australia) Diane Eastburn (United Kingdom) Linda Mottram (United States) Cecilia Martinez (United States) Peggy Michel
25 Nov	Queensland State Championships; Victoria, Australia; Non-tour event	(Australia) Evonne Goolagong (United States) Peggy Michel; 6–1, 6–2	(Australia) Vicki Lancaster (United States) Cecilia Martinez	(Belgium) Michele Gurdal (Australia) Wendy Turnbull	(Australia) Diane Eastburn (United Kingdom) Linda Mottram (United States) Cecilia Martinez (United States) Peggy Michel
25 Nov	Tokyo Gunze Classic; Tokyo, Japan; Non-tour event	(United States) Chris Evert; 6–0, 6–2	(United States) Rosie Casals		
25 Nov	Tokyo Gunze Classic; Tokyo, Japan; Non-tour event	(United States) Rosie Casals (Australia) Lesley Hunt; 6–3, 6–4	(United States) Julie Heldman (Japan) Kazuko Sawamatsu		

=== December ===
Week	Tournament	Champions	Runners-up	Semifinalists	Quarterfinalists
2 Dec	South Australian Championships; Adelaide, Australia; Non-tour event	(Soviet Union) Olga Morozova; 7–6, 2–6, 6–2	(Australia) Evonne Goolagong		
9 Dec	Western Australian Championships; Perth, Australia; Non-tour event	(Australia) Margaret Court; 6–4, 7–5	(Soviet Union) Olga Morozova		
9 Dec	Western Australian Championships; Perth, Australia; Non-tour event	(Soviet Union) Olga Morozova (Czechoslovakia) Martina Navratilova; 6–1, 6–3	(Australia) Lesley Hunt (Japan) Kazuko Sawamatsu		
16 Dec	New South Wales Championships; Sydney, Australia; Non-tour event	(Australia) Evonne Goolagong; 6–3, 7–5	(Australia) Margaret Court		
16 Dec	New South Wales Championships; Sydney, Australia; Non-tour event	(Australia) Evonne Goolagong (United States) Peggy Michel; 6–7, 6–4, 6–1	(Soviet Union) Olga Morozova (Czechoslovakia) Martina Navratilova		

== Earnings ==
Rk	Name	Virginia Slims	Total US	Total
1	(United States) Chris Evert	$113,985	$149,985	$261,460
2	(United States) Billie Jean King	$94,950	$129,950	$173,225
3	(Australia) Evonne Goolagong	$56,580	$73,480	$130,060
4	(United Kingdom) Virginia Wade	$51,413	$55,993	$85,389
5	(United States) Rosemary Casals	$44,925	$62,375	$72,389
6	(France) Françoise Dürr	$35,588	$40,008	$41,277
7	(Netherlands) Betty Stöve	$33,813	$39,233	$40,249
8	(Australia) Kerry Melville	$26,240	$42,940	$56,022
9	(Czechoslovakia) Martina Navratilova	$24,713	$26,963	$31,392
10	(Soviet Union) Olga Morozova	$21,675	$25,775	$40,877

== Statistical information ==
These tables present the number of singles (S), doubles (D), and mixed doubles (X) titles won by each player and each nation during the 1973 Virginia Slims Circuit. They also include data for the Grand Slam tournaments and the year-end championships. The table is sorted by:

1. total number of titles (a doubles title won by two players representing the same nation counts as only one win for the nation);
2. highest amount of highest category tournaments (for example, having a single Grand Slam gives preference over any kind of combination without a Grand Slam title);
3. a singles > doubles > mixed doubles hierarchy;
4. alphabetical order (by family names for players).

=== Key ===
Grand Slam tournaments
Year-end championships
Virginia Slims event

=== Titles won by player ===
Total	Player	S	D	X	S	D	S	D	S	D	X
21	Chris Evert (USA)	● ●	●				● ● ● ● ● ● ●	● ● ●	16	5	0
14	Billie Jean King (USA)	●	●	●		●	● ● ● ● ●	● ● ● ● ● ●	6	7	1
6	Evonne Goolagong (AUS)	●	● ●		●		●	●	3	3	0
6	Betty Stöve (NED)							● ● ● ● ● ●	0	6	0
5	Rosie Casals (USA)		●			●		● ● ●	0	5	0
4	Françoise Durr (FRA)							● ● ● ●	0	4	0
3	Olga Morozova (URS)		●				●	●	1	2	0
3	Martina Navratilova (TCH)			●			●	●	1	1	1
2	Peggy Michel (USA)		● ●						0	2	0
2	Virginia Wade (GBR)						● ●		2	0	0
1	Pam Teeguarden (USA)			●					0	0	1
1	Lesley Charles (GBR)							●	0	1	0
1	Isa Fernández (COL)							●	0	1	0
1	Kerry Harris (AUS)							●	0	1	0
1	Lesley Hunt (AUS)							●	0	1	0
1	Sue Mappin (GBR)							●	0	1	0
1	Janet Newberry (USA)							●	0	1	0
1	Wendy Overton (USA)							●	0	1	0

=== Titles won by nation ===
Total	Nation	S	D	X	S	D	S	D	S	D	X
31	United States (USA)	3	4	2	0	1	12	9	15	14	2
7	Australia (AUS)	1	2	0	1	0	1	2	3	4	0
6	Netherlands (NED)	0	0	0	0	0	0	6	0	6	0
6	France (FRA)	0	0	0	0	0	0	4	0	4	0
3	Soviet Union (URS)	0	1	0	0	0	1	1	1	2	0
3	Czechoslovakia (TCH)	0	0	1	0	0	1	1	1	1	1
3	Great Britain (GBR)	0	0	0	0	0	2	1	2	1	0
1	Colombia (COL)	0	0	0	0	0	0	1	0	1	0

== See also ==
- 1974 World Team Tennis season
- 1974 Men's Grand Prix circuit
