= 1974 in tennis =

This page covers all the important events in the sport of tennis in 1974. It provides the results of notable tournaments throughout the year on both the men's and the women's tennis circuits.

== Australian Open ==
Category	Champion(s)	Finalist(s)	Score
Men's singles	(United States) Jimmy Connors	(Australia) Phil Dent	7–6^{(9–7)}, 6–4, 4–6, 6–3
Women's singles	(Australia) Evonne Goolagong	(United States) Chris Evert	7–6, 4–6, 6–0
Men's doubles	(Australia) Ross Case (Australia) Geoff Masters	(Australia) Syd Ball (Australia) Bob Giltinan	3–6, 7–6, 6–2
Women's doubles	(Australia) Evonne Goolagong (United States) Peggy Michel	(Australia) Kerry Harris (Australia) Kerry Melville	7–5, 6–3
Mixed doubles	Competition not held between 1970 and 1986.		

== French Open ==
Category	Champion(s)	Finalist(s)	Score
Men's singles	(Sweden) Björn Borg (Note: Borg became the first Swedish tennis player (male or female) to win a Grand Slam singles title in the open era. In 1957 Sven Davidsson won Sweden's first Grand Slam singles title at French Open.)	(Spain) Manuel Orantes	2–6, 6–7^{(4–7)}, 6–0, 6–1, 6–1 (Note: Borg's 1st career Grand Slam title.)
Women's singles	(United States) Chris Evert (Note: Evert's 1st career Grand Slam title.)	(Soviet Union) Olga Morozova (Note: Morozova was the first player (male or female) from the Soviet Union to reach a Grand Slam final in the Open Era.)	6–1, 6–2
Men's doubles	(Australia) Dick Crealy (New Zealand) Onny Parun	(United States) Bob Lutz (United States) Stanley Smith	6–3, 6–2, 3–6, 5–7, 6–1
Women's doubles	(United States) Chris Evert (Soviet Union) Olga Morozova	(France) Gail Sherriff Chanfreau (West Germany) Katja Burgemeister Ebbinghaus	6–4, 2–6, 6–1
Mixed doubles	(Czechoslovakia) Martina Navratilova (Colombia) Iván Molina	(Mexico) Rosie Reyes Darmon (Mexico) Marcello Lara	6–3, 6–3

== Wimbledon ==
Category	Champion(s)	Finalist(s)	Score
Men's singles	(United States) Jimmy Connors	(Australia) Ken Rosewall	6–1, 6–1, 6–4 (Note: It was Connors's 2nd career Grand Slam title, and his 1st Wimbledon title.)
Women's singles	(United States) Chris Evert	(Soviet Union) Olga Morozova	6–0, 6–4 (Note: It was Evert's 2nd career Grand Slam title, and her 1st Wimbledon title.)
Men's doubles	(Australia) John Newcombe (Australia) Tony Roche	(United States) Bob Lutz (United States) Stan Smith	8–6, 6–4, 6–4
Women's doubles	(Australia) Evonne Goolagong (United States) Peggy Michel	(Australia) Helen Gourlay (Australia) Karen Krantzcke	2–6, 6–4, 6–3
Mixed doubles	(Australia) Owen Davidson (United States) Billie Jean King	(United Kingdom) Mark Farrell (United Kingdom) Lesley Charles	6–3, 9–7

== US Open ==
Category	Champion(s)	Finalist(s)	Score
Men's singles	(United States) Jimmy Connors	(Australia) Ken Rosewall	6–1, 6–0, 6–1 (Note: It was Connors 3rd career Grand Slam title, and his 1st US Open title. Connors' victory took just over an hour.)
Women's singles	(United States) Billie Jean King	(Australia) Evonne Goolagong	3–6, 6–3, 7–5 (Note: It was King's 11th career Grand Slam title, her 7th during the Open Era, and her 4th (and last) US Open title.)
Men's doubles	(United States) Bob Lutz (United States) Stan Smith	(Chile) Patricio Cornejo (Chile) Jaime Fillol	6–3, 6–3
Women's doubles	(United States) Rosemary Casals (United States) Billie Jean King	(France) Françoise Dürr (Netherlands) Betty Stöve	7–6, 6–7, 6–4
Mixed doubles	(United States) Pam Teeguarden (Australia) Geoff Masters	(United States) Chris Evert (United States) Jimmy Connors	6–1, 7–6
