= 1974 Melia Trophy =

- Date: 7–13 October
- Edition: 3rd
- Category: Grand Prix (Group A)
- Draw: 68S / 32D
- Prize money: $75,000
- Surface: Clay / outdoor
- Location: Madrid, Spain
- Venue: Real Sociedad Hípica Española Club de Campo

Champions

Men's singles
- (Romania) Ilie Năstase

Women's singles
- (West Germany) Helga Masthoff

Men's doubles
- (France) Patrice Dominguez / (Spain) Antonio Muñoz

Women's doubles
- (United Kingdom) Lesley Charles / (United Kingdom) Sue Mappin

Mixed doubles
- (Romania) Ion Țiriac / (Romania) Virginia Ruzici
← 1973 ·	Madrid Tennis Grand Prix	· 1975 →

The 1974 Melia Trophy, also known as the Madrid Open, was a combined men's and women's tennis tournament played on outdoor clay courts at the Real Sociedad Hípica Española Club de Campo in Madrid, Spain. The men's tournament was classified as Group A category and was part of the 1974 Grand Prix circuit. It was the third edition of the tournament and was held from 7 October until 13 October 1974. Ilie Năstase and Helga Masthoff won the singles titles.

== Finals ==
=== Men's singles ===
(Romania) Ilie Năstase defeated (Sweden) Björn Borg 6–4, 5–7, 6–2, 4–6, 6–4

=== Women's singles ===
(West Germany) Helga Masthoff defeated (Netherlands) Tine Zwaan 6–2, 6–4

=== Men's doubles ===
(France) Patrice Dominguez / (Spain) Antonio Muñoz defeated (United States) Brian Gottfried / (Mexico) Raúl Ramírez 6–1, 6–3

=== Women's doubles ===
(United Kingdom) Lesley Charles / (United Kingdom) Sue Mappin defeated (West Germany) Cora Creytd / (West Germany) Helga Masthoff 6–2, ret.

=== Mixed doubles ===
(Romania) Virginia Ruzici / (Romania) Ion Țiriac defeated (United Kingdom) Mark Farrell / (United Kingdom) Lesley Charles 7–6, 4–6, 6–3
