= 1974 US Open – Mixed doubles =

Mixed doubles
- 1974 US Open

Final
- Champions: (Australia) Geoff Masters (United States) Pam Teeguarden
- Runners-up: (United States) Jimmy Connors (United States) Chris Evert
- Score: 6–1, 7–6

Details
- Draw: 32
- Seeds: 4

Events
Singles	men	women		boys	girls
Doubles	men	women	mixed	boys	girls
WC Singles	men	women	quad
WC Doubles	men	women	quad
Legends	men	women	mixed
- US Open

Owen Davidson and Billie Jean King were the defending champions but lost in the semifinals to Geoff Masters and Pam Teeguarden.

Geoff Masters and Pam Teeguarden won in the final 6–1, 7–6 against Jimmy Connors and Chris Evert. The victors got $2,000.

== Seeds ==
1. (Australia) Owen Davidson / (United States) Billie Jean King (semifinals)
2. (Soviet Union) Alex Metreveli / (United Kingdom) Virginia Wade (second round)
3. (United States) Jimmy Connors / (United States) Chris Evert (final)
4. (United Kingdom) Mark Farrell / (United Kingdom) Lesley Charles (quarterfinals)

== Draw ==
Key

- Q = Qualifier
- WC = Wild card
- LL = Lucky loser
- Alt = Alternate
- ITF = ITF entry
- PR = Protected ranking
- SR = Special ranking
- SE = Special exempt
- JE = Junior exempt
- JR = Junior Accelerator Programme entrant
- CO = College Accelerator Programme entrant
- NG = Next Gen Accelerator Program entrant
- w/o = Walkover
- r = Retired
- d = Defaulted

=== Finals ===
Semifinals
(Australia) Ray Keldie (Argentina) Raquel Giscafré	6	5
3	(United States) Jimmy Connors (United States) Chris Evert	7	7
(Australia) Geoff Masters (United States) Pam Teeguarden	7	6
1	(Australia) Owen Davidson (United States) Billie Jean King	6	4

Final
3	(United States) Jimmy Connors (United States) Chris Evert	1	6
(Australia) Geoff Masters (United States) Pam Teeguarden	6	7

=== Top half ===
First round
2	(Soviet Union) A Metreveli (United Kingdom) V Wade	w/o
(Brazil) T Koch (United States) K Pigeon
(United States) J Akindele (United Kingdom) L Beaven	0	1
(Australia) R Keldie (Argentina) R Giscafré	6	6
(United States) E Scott (United States) R Fox	7	2	7
(Mexico) R Ramírez (United States) S Hagey	6	6	5
(United States) S Messmer (United States) P Bostrom	4	6	2
(India) J Singh (United States) P Michel	6	3	6
3	(United States) J Connors (United States) C Evert	6	7
(United States) B Martin (United States) R Tenney	1	6
(India) V Amritraj (United States) K May	4	4
(United States) V Gerulaitis (United States) R Gerulaitis	6	6
(United States) R Reid (Australia) K Melville	6	6
(United States) S Segura (United States) J Evert	3	3
(Australia) P Kronk (United States) L Tenney	4	6
(Australia) R Ruffels (United States) S Stap	6	7

Second round
2	(Soviet Union) A Metreveli (United Kingdom) V Wade	6	4	2
(Australia) R Keldie (Argentina) R Giscafré	4	6	6
(United States) E Scott (United States) R Fox	6	7
(India) J Singh (United States) P Michel	2	6
3	(United States) J Connors (United States) C Evert	6	6
(United States) V Gerulaitis (United States) R Gerulaitis	3	4
(United States) R Reid (Australia) K Melville	7	3	2
(Australia) R Ruffels (United States) S Stap	5	6	6

Quarterfinals
(Australia) R Keldie (Argentina) R Giscafré	6	6
(United States) E Scott (United States) R Fox	2	3
3	(United States) J Connors (United States) C Evert	6	6
(Australia) R Ruffels (United States) S Stap	3	1

Semifinals
(Australia) R Keldie (Argentina) R Giscafré	6	5
3	(United States) J Connors (United States) C Evert	7	7

=== Bottom half ===
First round
(Australia) G Masters (United States) P Teeguarden	6	6
(Soviet Union) T Kakulia (Romania) M Simionescu	3	1
(United States) D Horwitz (United States) J Horwitz	4	2
(United States) B Seewagen (Australia) P Faulkner	6	6
(Australia) R Case (South Africa) B Cuypers	6	3	4
(United Kingdom) R Taylor (United Kingdom) F Taylor	2	6	6
(United States) H Richardson (Brazil) M Bueno	1	6
4	(United Kingdom) M Farrell (United Kingdom) L Charles	6	7
(United States) Dick Stockton (United States) Donna Stockton	6	6
(United States) P Sullivan (United States) P Hogan	4	2
(United States) S Smith (United States) M Gengler	6	6
(Australia) D Candy (Netherlands) B Stöve	4	2
(Australia) D Crealy (Australia) D Fromholtz	4	2
(United States) M Estep (Czechoslovakia) M Navratilova	6	6
(Rhodesia) H Irvine (Australia) H Gourlay	7	4	3
1	(Australia) O Davidson (United States) BJ King	6	6	6

Second round
(Australia) G Masters (United States) P Teeguarden	6	6
(United States) B Seewagen (Australia) P Faulkner	3	4
(United Kingdom) R Taylor (United Kingdom) F Taylor	3	2
4	(United Kingdom) M Farrell (United Kingdom) L Charles	6	6
(United States) Dick Stockton (United States) Donna Stockton	6	6
(United States) S Smith (United States) M Gengler	3	4
(United States) M Estep (Czechoslovakia) M Navratilova	3	7	4
1	(Australia) O Davidson (United States) BJ King	6	6	6

Quarterfinals
(Australia) G Masters (United States) P Teeguarden	3	6	7
4	(United Kingdom) M Farrell (United Kingdom) L Charles	6	4	5
(United States) Dick Stockton (United States) Donna Stockton	5	6	4
1	(Australia) O Davidson (United States) BJ King	7	4	6

Semifinals
(Australia) G Masters (United States) P Teeguarden	7	6
1	(Australia) O Davidson (United States) BJ King	6	4
