= 1974 Virginia Slims of Newport =

- Date: August 22–26
- Edition: 4th
- Draw: 62S / ?D
- Prize money: $30,000
- Surface: Grass / outdoor
- Location: Newport, Rhode Island, U.S.
- Venue: Newport Casino

Champions

Singles
- (United States) Chris Evert

Doubles
- (United Kingdom) Lesley Charles / (United Kingdom) Sue Mappin
← 1973 ·	Virginia Slims of Newport	· 1983 →

The 1974 Virginia Slims of Newport, was a women's tennis tournament played on outdoor grass courts at the Newport Casino in Newport, Rhode Island in the United States that was part of the 1974 Virginia Slims World Championship Series. It was the fourth edition of the tournament and was held from August 22 through August 26, 1974. First-seeded Chris Evert won the singles title and earned $4,500 first-prize money.

== Finals ==
=== Singles ===
(United States) Chris Evert defeated (United States) Betsy Nagelsen 6–4, 6–3

- It was Evert's 13th singles title of the year and the 36th of her career.

=== Doubles ===
(United Kingdom) Lesley Charles / (United Kingdom) Sue Mappin defeated (France) Gail Chanfreau / (United States) Julie Heldman 6–2, 7–5
