= 1975 Eastbourne Championships =

- Date: 16–21 June
- Edition: 2nd
- Category: Women's International Grand Prix
- Draw: 64S / 32D
- Prize money: £10,000 ($23,000)
- Surface: Grass / outdoor
- Location: Eastbourne, United Kingdom
- Venue: Devonshire Park
- Attendance: 11,908

Champions

Singles
- (United Kingdom) Virginia Wade

Doubles
- (United States) Julie Anthony / (Soviet Union) Olga Morozova
← 1974 ·	Eastbourne International	· 1976 →

The 1975 Eastbourne Championships was a women's tennis tournament played on outdoor grass courts at Devonshire Park in Eastbourne in the United Kingdom. The event was part of the Women's International Grand Prix circuit of the 1975 WTA Tour. It was the second edition of the tournament and was held from 16 June through 21 June 1975. Fifth-seeded Virginia Wade won the singles title and earned £1,750 ($4,025) first-prize money.

== Finals ==
=== Singles ===
(United Kingdom) Virginia Wade defeated (United States) Billie Jean King 7–5, 4–6, 6–3

=== Doubles ===
(United States) Julie Anthony / (Soviet Union) Olga Morozova defeated (Australia) Evonne Goolagong / (United States) Peggy Michel 6–2, 6–4
