= 1974 US Open – Women's doubles =

Women's doubles
- 1974 US Open

Final
- Champion: (United States) Rosemary Casals (United States) Billie Jean King
- Runner-up: (France) Françoise Dürr (Netherlands) Betty Stöve
- Score: 7–6, 6–7, 6–4

Details
- Draw: 32
- Seeds: 4

Events
Singles	men	women		boys	girls
Doubles	men	women	mixed	boys	girls
WC Singles	men	women	quad
WC Doubles	men	women	quad
Legends	men	women	mixed
← 1973 ·	US Open	· 1975 →

Margaret Court and Virginia Wade were the defending champions but only Virginia Wade competed that year with Lesley Hunt. Lesley Hunt and Virginia Wade lost in the semifinals to Rosemary Casals and Billie Jean King.

Rosemary Casals and Billie Jean King won the title by defeating Françoise Dürr and Betty Stöve 7–6, 6–7, 6–4 in the final. The winning team earned $4,500.

== Seeds ==
1. (Australia) Evonne Goolagong / (United States) Peggy Michel (semifinals)
2. (United States) Rosie Casals / (United States) Billie Jean King (champions)
3. (France) Françoise Dürr / (Netherlands) Betty Stöve (final)
4. (Australia) Helen Gourlay / (Australia) Karen Krantzcke (quarterfinals)

== Draw ==
=== Key ===
- Q = Qualifier
- WC = Wild card
- LL = Lucky loser
- Alt = Alternate
- SE = Special exempt
- PR = Protected ranking
- ITF = ITF entry
- JE = Junior exempt
- w/o = Walkover
- r = Retired
- d = Defaulted
- SR = Special ranking

=== Finals ===
Semifinals
2	(United States) Rosie Casals (United States) Billie Jean King	6	5	6
(Australia) Lesley Hunt (United Kingdom) Virginia Wade	1	7	1
3	(France) Françoise Dürr (Netherlands) Betty Stöve	6	5	6
1	(Australia) Evonne Goolagong (United States) Peggy Michel	3	7	4

Final
2	(United States) Rosie Casals (United States) Billie Jean King	7	6	6
3	(France) Françoise Dürr (Netherlands) Betty Stöve	6	7	4

=== Top half ===
First round
2	(United States) R Casals (United States) BJ King	6	6
(United Kingdom) L Beaven (United Kingdom) L Blachford	1	1
(Romania) V Ruzici (Romania) M Simionescu	6	6
(United States) B Downs (United States) K Pigeon	4	3
(Czechoslovakia) M Neumanová (United States) L Tenney	1	4
(Netherlands) E Appel (Netherlands) T Zwaan	6	6
(United States) S Greer (Japan) K Sawamatsu	3	4
(United States) P Bostrom (United States) W Overton	6	6
(United States) L duPont (United States) K Harter	4	4
(United States) TA Fretz (United States) C Martinez	6	6
(Sweden) I Bentzer (United States) J Heldman	6	2	3
(Australia) L Hunt (United Kingdom) V Wade	4	6	6
(United Kingdom) J Fayter (United States) P Hogan	7	6
(Brazil) M Bueno (United States) L Fleming	6	4
(South Africa) B Cuypers (United States) S Stap	3	3
4	(Australia) H Gourlay (Australia) K Krantzcke	6	6

Second round
2	(United States) R Casals (United States) BJ King	6	6
(Romania) V Ruzici (Romania) M Simionescu	1	3
(Netherlands) E Appel (Netherlands) T Zwaan	2	0
(United States) P Bostrom (United States) W Overton	6	6
(United States) TA Fretz (United States) C Martinez	5	4
(Australia) L Hunt (United Kingdom) V Wade	7	6
(United Kingdom) J Fayter (United States) P Hogan	3	3
4	(Australia) H Gourlay (Australia) K Krantzcke	6	6

Quarterfinals
2	(United States) R Casals (United States) BJ King	6	6
(United States) P Bostrom (United States) W Overton	4	4
(Australia) L Hunt (United Kingdom) V Wade	7	6
4	(Australia) H Gourlay (Australia) K Krantzcke	6	4

Semifinals
2	(United States) R Casals (United States) BJ King	6	5	6
(Australia) L Hunt (United Kingdom) V Wade	1	7	1

=== Bottom half ===
First round
3	(France) F Dürr (Netherlands) B Stöve	7	6
(United States) J Evert (United States) K Kuykendall	5	1
(United States) C Meyer (Denmark) H Sparre	6	4	6
(Socialist Federal Republic of Yugoslavia) M Jaušovec (United States) R Tenney	4	6	3
(Australia) P Faulkner (United States) J Haas	3	5
(United States) J Newberry (United States) S Walsh	6	7
(Argentina) R Giscafré (Czechoslovakia) M Navratilova	6	7
(Australia) C O'Neil (Australia) J Walker	4	5
(Australia) D Fromholtz (Australia) J Young	6	4
(United States) R Fox (United States) M Schallau	7	6
(West Germany) K Ebbinghaus (United States) K Latham	4	2
(United States) K May (United States) P Teeguarden	6	6
(United States) A Kiyomura (United States) B Nagelsen	3	6
(United Kingdom) L Charles (United Kingdom) S Mappin	6	7
(United States) K Kemmer (South Africa) I Kloss	1	6	4
1	(Australia) E Goolagong (United States) P Michel	6	4	6

Second round
3	(France) F Dürr (Netherlands) B Stöve	7	7
(United States) C Meyer (Denmark) H Sparre	6	6
(United States) J Newberry (United States) S Walsh	6	5	2
(Argentina) R Giscafré (Czechoslovakia) M Navratilova	4	7	6
(United States) R Fox (United States) M Schallau	6	6
(United States) K May (United States) P Teeguarden	2	3
(United Kingdom) L Charles (United Kingdom) S Mappin	3	6	4
1	(Australia) E Goolagong (United States) P Michel	6	2	6

Quarterfinals
3	(France) F Dürr (Netherlands) B Stöve	6	6
(Argentina) R Giscafré (Czechoslovakia) M Navratilova	0	2
(United States) R Fox (United States) M Schallau	6	2	2
1	(Australia) E Goolagong (United States) P Michel	4	6	6

Semifinals
3	(France) F Dürr (Netherlands) B Stöve	6	5	6
1	(Australia) E Goolagong (United States) P Michel	3	7	4
