= Luis Felipe Tavares =

Brazilian tennis player

- Country (sports): Brazil
- Born: 26 September 1949 (age 75)

Singles
- Career record: 10–16
- Highest ranking: No. 210 (20 Dec 1974)

Grand Slam singles results
- French Open: Q3 (1975)
- Wimbledon: Q1 (1972)
- US Open: 1R (1974)

Doubles
- Career record: 6–14

Grand Slam doubles results
- French Open: 1R (1969)
- Wimbledon: 3R (1972)
- US Open: 2R (1974)

Luis Felipe Tavares (born 26 September 1949) is a Brazilian former professional tennis player.

Tavares competed for the Brazil Davis Cup team from 1966 to 1976, winning four singles and one doubles rubbers. He reached the doubles third round of the 1972 Wimbledon Championships and made his only grand slam singles main draw appearance at the 1974 US Open. His sports marketing company Koch Tavares, which he founded in 1972 with Davis Cup teammate Thomaz Koch, is responsible for running events across a variety of sports.

== See also ==
- List of Brazil Davis Cup team representatives
