= 1974 US Open – Men's doubles =

Men's doubles
- 1974 US Open

Final
- Champions: (United States) Bob Lutz (United States) Stan Smith
- Runners-up: (Chile) Patricio Cornejo (Chile) Jaime Fillol
- Score: 6–3, 6–3

Details
- Draw: 51
- Seeds: 8

Events
Singles	men	women		boys	girls
Doubles	men	women	mixed	boys	girls
WC Singles	men	women	quad
WC Doubles	men	women	quad
Legends	men	women	mixed
← 1973 ·	US Open	· 1975 →

Owen Davidson and John Newcombe were the defending champions, but competed this year with different partners. Davidson teamed up with Ken Rosewall and lost in second round to Anand Amritraj and Vijay Amritraj, while Newcombe teamed up with Tony Roche and lost in semifinals to tournament runners-up Patricio Cornejo and Jaime Fillol.

Bob Lutz and Stan Smith won the title by defeating Patricio Cornejo and Jaime Fillol 6–3, 6–3 in the final.

== Seeds ==
Some seeds received a bye into the second round.

1. (Australia) John Newcombe / (Australia) Tony Roche (semifinals)
2. (United States) Bob Lutz / (United States) Stan Smith (champions)
3. (United States) Arthur Ashe / (United States) Roscoe Tanner (first round)
4. (United States) Charlie Pasarell / (United States) Erik van Dillen (first round)
5. (Australia) Owen Davidson / (Australia) Ken Rosewall (second round)
6. (Australia) John Alexander / (United States) Marty Riessen (quarterfinals)
7. (United States) Brian Gottfried / (Mexico) Raúl Ramírez (quarterfinals)
8. (Chile) Patricio Cornejo / (Chile) Jaime Fillol (final)

== Draw ==
=== Key ===
- Q = Qualifier
- WC = Wild card
- LL = Lucky loser
- Alt = Alternate
- ITF = ITF entry
- PR = Protected ranking
- SR = Special ranking
- SE = Special exempt
- JE = Junior exempt
- JR = Junior Accelerator Programme entrant
- CO = College Accelerator Programme entrant
- NG = Next Gen Accelerator Program entrant
- w/o = Walkover
- r = Retired
- d = Defaulted

=== Finals ===
Quarterfinals
1	(Australia) John Newcombe (Australia) Tony Roche	7	6	5	5	6
7	(United States) Brian Gottfried (Mexico) Raúl Ramírez	6	1	7	7	4
(United States) Clark Graebner (South Africa) Raymond Moore	6	6	7	4	3
8	(Chile) Patricio Cornejo (Chile) Jaime Fillol	7	4	5	6	6
(Australia) Ross Case (Australia) Geoff Masters	6	6	6	1
(Australia) Syd Ball (Australia) Ray Keldie	1	7	7	6
6	(Australia) John Alexander (United States) Marty Riessen	6	6	3	4	4
2	(United States) Bob Lutz (United States) Stan Smith	4	4	6	6	6

Semifinals
1	(Australia) John Newcombe (Australia) Tony Roche	7	3	6
8	(Chile) Patricio Cornejo (Chile) Jaime Fillol	6	6	7
(Australia) Syd Ball (Australia) Ray Keldie	4	4
2	(United States) Bob Lutz (United States) Stan Smith	6	6

Final
8	(Chile) Patricio Cornejo (Chile) Jaime Fillol	3	3
2	(United States) Bob Lutz (United States) Stan Smith	6	6

=== Top half ===
==== Section 1 ====
First round
(United States) K Jennings (United States) P Sullivan	3	2
(New Zealand) J Simpson (South Africa) J Yuill	6	6
(United States) P Gerken (Pakistan) H Rahim	6	6
(Czechoslovakia) J Kodeš (Czechoslovakia) V Zedník	4	4
(United States) D Dell (United States) S Stewart	6	4	7
(United Kingdom) G Battrick (Australia) R Ruffels	4	6	6

Second round
1	(Australia) J Newcombe (Australia) T Roche	6	6
(Brazil) T Koch (Brazil) LF Tavares	4	4
(Mexico) J Loyo Mayo (Australia) B Phillips-Moore	w	/	o
(Sweden) O Bengtson (Sweden) B Borg
7	(United States) B Gottfried (Mexico) R Ramírez	6	6
(New Zealand) J Simpson (South Africa) J Yuill	3	3
(United States) P Gerken (Pakistan) H Rahim	2	3
(United States) D Dell (United States) S Stewart	6	6

Third round
1	(Australia) J Newcombe (Australia) T Roche	7	7
(Mexico) J Loyo Mayo (Australia) B Phillips-Moore	6	6
7	(United States) B Gottfried (Mexico) R Ramírez	6	6
(United States) D Dell (United States) S Stewart	4	3

Quarterfinals
1	(Australia) J Newcombe (Australia) T Roche	7	6	5	5	6
7	(United States) B Gottfried (Mexico) R Ramírez	6	1	7	7	4

==== Section 2 ====
First round
3	(United States) A Ashe (United States) R Tanner	7	3	6
(United States) M Estep (United States) C Owens	6	6	7
(United States) P Fleming (United States) V Gerulaitis	6	6
(United States) J McEnroe (Mexico) A Palafox	3	3
(Australia) C Dibley (Egypt) I El Shafei	5	3
(United States) C Graebner (South Africa) R Moore	7	6
(United Kingdom) J Feaver (United States) R Reid	3	6	7
(Australia) P Doerner (Rhodesia) R Dowdeswell	6	1	6
8	(Chile) P Cornejo (Chile) J Fillol	6	7
(United States) H Bunis (United States) B Seewagen	1	6
(United States) J Connors (United States) S Segura	6	5	6
(United States) P DuPré (United States) A Neely	4	7	7
(United States) B Manson (United States) F Taygan	6	7
(United States) B Martin (United States) G Scott	4	6
(Australia) D Crealy (New Zealand) O Parun	7	1	7
(Chile) J Pinto Bravo (Chile) B Prajoux	5	6	5

Second round
(United States) M Estep (United States) C Owens	6	3	6
(United States) P Fleming (United States) V Gerulaitis	4	6	3
(United States) C Graebner (South Africa) R Moore	6	6
(United Kingdom) J Feaver (United States) R Reid	3	3
8	(Chile) P Cornejo (Chile) J Fillol	6	7
(United States) P DuPré (United States) A Neely	4	6
(United States) B Manson (United States) F Taygan	6	7
(Australia) D Crealy (New Zealand) O Parun	4	6

Third round
(United States) M Estep (United States) C Owens	6	3	5
(United States) C Graebner (South Africa) R Moore	4	6	7
8	(Chile) P Cornejo (Chile) J Fillol	6	6
(United States) B Manson (United States) F Taygan	3	2

Quarterfinals
(United States) C Graebner (South Africa) R Moore	6	6	7	4	3
8	(Chile) P Cornejo (Chile) J Fillol	7	4	5	6	6

=== Bottom half ===
==== Section 3 ====
First round
(South Africa) P Cramer (United States) R Kreiss	4	4
(United States) J Borowiak (United States) J McManus	6	6
(United States) J Austin (United States) D Bohrnstedt	2	1
(Australia) R Case (Australia) G Masters	6	6
(India) A Amritraj (India) V Amritraj	3	7	6
(United States) J Andrews (India) S Menon	6	6	4
(United States) M Machette (United States) F McNair	1	6
5	(Australia) O Davidson (Australia) K Rosewall	6	7
(United States) S Krulevitz (India) J Singh	w	/	o
(Spain) M Orantes (Argentina) G Vilas
(Australia) S Ball (Australia) R Keldie	6	7
(United States) D Crawford (United States) S Turner	2	5
(United Kingdom) M Farrell (United Kingdom) J Lloyd	6	4
(Soviet Union) T Kakulia (Australia) P Kronk	7	6
(Australia) B Carmichael (Australia) A Stone	6	6
4	(United States) C Pasarell (United States) E van Dillen	3	4

Second round
(United States) J Borowiak (United States) J McManus	3	4
(Australia) R Case (Australia) G Masters	6	6
(India) A Amritraj (India) V Amritraj	2	6	6
5	(Australia) O Davidson (Australia) K Rosewall	6	4	3
(United States) S Krulevitz (India) J Singh	1	2
(Australia) S Ball (Australia) R Keldie	6	6
(Soviet Union) T Kakulia (Australia) P Kronk	3	6	6
(Australia) B Carmichael (Australia) A Stone	6	1	7

Third round
(Australia) R Case (Australia) G Masters	6	6
(India) A Amritraj (India) V Amritraj	2	3
(Australia) S Ball (Australia) R Keldie	7	6
(Australia) B Carmichael (Australia) A Stone	6	4

Quarterfinals
(Australia) R Case (Australia) G Masters	6	6	6	1
(Australia) S Ball (Australia) R Keldie	1	7	7	6

==== Section 4 ====
First round

Second round
(Australia) I Fletcher (Australia) K Warwick	6	3
(Soviet Union) A Metreveli (United Kingdom) R Taylor	7	6
(United States) V Amaya (United States) G Hardie	6	4
6	(Australia) J Alexander (United States) M Riessen	7	6
(United States) R Barth (Venezuela) H Hose	6	7
(Chile) A Cornejo (Chile) C Feldstedt	3	5
(United States) B Teacher (United States) T Waltke	2	4
2	(United States) B Lutz (United States) S Smith	6	6

Third round
(Soviet Union) A Metreveli (United Kingdom) R Taylor	6	3	5
6	(Australia) J Alexander (United States) M Riessen	4	6	7
(United States) R Barth (Venezuela) H Hose	4	5
2	(United States) B Lutz (United States) S Smith	6	7

Quarterfinals
6	(Australia) J Alexander (United States) M Riessen	6	6	3	4	4
2	(United States) B Lutz (United States) S Smith	4	4	6	6	6
