= 1974 US Open – Women's singles =

Women's singles
- 1974 US Open

Final
- Champion: (United States) Billie Jean King
- Runner-up: (Australia) Evonne Goolagong
- Score: 3–6, 6–3, 7–5

Details
- Draw: 64
- Seeds: 8

Events
Singles	men	women		boys	girls
Doubles	men	women	mixed	boys	girls
WC Singles	men	women	quad
WC Doubles	men	women	quad
Legends	men	women	mixed
← 1973 ·	US Open	· 1975 →

Billie Jean King defeated Evonne Goolagong in the final, 3–6, 6–3, 7–5 to win the women's singles tennis title at the 1974 US Open. It was her fourth US Open singles title and eleventh major singles title overall. Goolagong was attempting to complete the career Grand Slam.

Margaret Court was the reigning champion, but did not compete this year.

Chris Evert held a 55-match winning streak before being defeated by Goolagong in the semifinals. This was an Open Era record streak length until 1984, when it was surpassed by Martina Navratilova.

This was the last edition of the tournament to be held on grass courts, as it would switch to clay the following year.

== Seeds ==
The seeded players are listed below. Billie Jean King is the champion; others show the round in which they were eliminated.

1. (United States) Chris Evert (semifinalist)
2. (United States) Billie Jean King (champion)
3. (Soviet Union) Olga Morozova (withdrew before the tournament began)
4. (Australia) Kerry Melville (quarterfinalist)
5. (Australia) Evonne Goolagong (finalist)
6. (United States) Rosie Casals (quarterfinalist)
7. (United Kingdom) Virginia Wade (second round)
8. (Australia) Lesley Hunt (quarterfinalist)

== Draw ==
=== Key ===
- Q = Qualifier
- WC = Wild card
- LL = Lucky loser
- r = Retired

=== Final eight ===
Quarterfinals
2	(United States) Billie Jean King	6	7
6	(United States) Rosie Casals	1	6
(United States) Julie Heldman	7	7
(United States) Nancy Richey Gunter	5	6
5	(Australia) Evonne Goolagong	6	7
4	(Australia) Kerry Melville	4	5
8	(Australia) Lesley Hunt	6	3
1	(United States) Chris Evert	7	6

Semifinals
2	(United States) Billie Jean King	2	6	6
(United States) Julie Heldman	6	3	1
5	(Australia) Evonne Goolagong	6	6	6
1	(United States) Chris Evert	0	7	3

Finals
2	(United States) Billie Jean King	3	6	7
5	(Australia) Evonne Goolagong	6	3	5

=== Earlier rounds ===
==== Section 1 ====
First round
2	(United States) King	6	6
(Colombia) Fernández-De Soto	2	2
(United States) Walsh	6	6
(United States) Tenney	3	3
(United States) Nagelsen	6	6	6
(Czechoslovakia) Neumannová	7	2	3
(United States) Teeguarden	6	6
(United States) Overton	3	1
6	(United States) Casals	6	6
(United States) Downs	2	2
(South Africa) Kloss	6	4	7
(United States) Newberry	2	6	5
(Romania) Simionescu	7	7
(United States) Ganz	5	6
(Australia) Fromholtz	6	6
(United States) duPont	1	2

Second round
2	(United States) King	6	6
(United States) Walsh	0	1
(United States) Nagelsen	6	6
(United States) Teeguarden	3	3
6	(United States) Casals	6	6
(South Africa) Kloss	3	4
(Romania) Simionescu	6	2	4
(Australia) Fromholtz	1	6	6

Third round
2	(United States) King	6	6
(United States) Nagelsen	4	2
6	(United States) Casals	7	6
(Australia) Fromholtz	6	2

Quarterfinals
2	(United States) King	6	7
6	(United States) Casals	1	6

==== Section 2 ====
First round
(Czechoslovakia) Navratilova	3	7	7
(United States) Fox	6	5	6
(Netherlands) Stöve	6	6
(France) Fuchs	4	2
(United States) Heldman	6	6
(United States) Louie	0	1
(Australia) Young	6	6
(United Kingdom) Fayter	2	1
7	(United Kingdom) Wade	6	6
(United States) Schallau	1	1
(United States) Kiyomura	6	6
(United States) Michel	3	0
(Australia) Faulkner	2	6	6
(Romania) Ruzici	6	3	3
(United States) Richey Gunter	6	2	6
(Australia) O'Neil	1	6	2

Second round
(Czechoslovakia) Navratilova	6	6
(Netherlands) Stöve	2	2
(United States) Heldman	2	6	6
(Australia) Young	6	3	4
7	(United Kingdom) Wade	6	6	5
(United States) Kiyomura	7	2	7
(Australia) Faulkner	6	1	3
(United States) Richey Gunter	4	6	6

Third round
(Czechoslovakia) Navratilova	4	4
(United States) Heldman	6	6
(United States) Kiyomura	2	2
(United States) Richey Gunter	6	6

Quarterfinals
(United States) Heldman	7	7
(United States) Richey Gunter	5	6

==== Section 3 ====
First round
(Israel) Peisachov	6	7
(United Kingdom) Charles	2	5
(West Germany) Ebbinghaus	6	6
(United States) Fleming	1	0
(Netherlands) Zwaan	1	6	6
(Australia) Krantzcke	6	2	3
5	(Australia) Goolagong	6	6
(United States) Evert J	3	0
(United States) Meyer	6	6
(United States) Anthony	4	2
(United States) Martinez	6	6	6
(United States) Kuykendall	7	1	4
(United States) Latham	6	6
(United States) Stap	4	2
4	(Australia) Melville	4
(Chile) Pinto Bravo	0	r

Second round
(Israel) Peisachov	6	5	5
(West Germany) Ebbinghaus	4	7	7
(Netherlands) Zwaan	1	2
5	(Australia) Goolagong	6	6
(United States) Meyer	7	6
(United States) Martinez	6	4
(United States) Latham	3	6
4	(Australia) Melville	6	7

Third round
(West Germany) Ebbinghaus	0	0
5	(Australia) Goolagong	6	6
(United States) Meyer	6	6	1
4	(Australia) Melville	7	1	6

Quarterfinals
5	(Australia) Goolagong	6	7
4	(Australia) Melville	4	5

==== Section 4 ====
First round
(France) Dürr	6	6
(United States) Haas	3	4
(United Kingdom) Mappin	6	3	6
(United States) Antonoplis	4	6	2
(Socialist Federal Republic of Yugoslavia) Jaušovec	6	6
(United States) Kemmer	4	2
8	(Australia) Hunt	6	7
(Japan) Sawamatsu	4	5
(United Kingdom) Beaven	6	4	6
(Denmark) Sparre	4	6	0
(United States) Hogan	6	6
(United States) Greer	2	0
(Australia) Gourlay	1	6	6
(Argentina) Giscafré	6	2	2
1	(United States) Evert	6	6
(France) Chanfreau	1	1

Second round
(France) Dürr	5	6
(United Kingdom) Mappin	7	7
(Socialist Federal Republic of Yugoslavia) Jaušovec	2	3
8	(Australia) Hunt	6	6
(United Kingdom) Beaven	1	2
(United States) Hogan	6	6
(Australia) Gourlay	1	1
1	(United States) Evert	6	6

Third round
(United Kingdom) Mappin	2	0
8	(Australia) Hunt	6	6
(United States) Hogan	2	2
1	(United States) Evert	6	6

Quarterfinals
8	(Australia) Hunt	6	3
1	(United States) Evert	7	6

Preceded by 1974 Wimbledon Championships – Women's singles	Grand Slam women's singles	Succeeded by 1975 Australian Open – Women's singles
