= 1974 Barnett Bank Tennis Classic =

Women's tennis tournament

- Date: September 22–26
- Edition: 1st
- Category: USLTA circuit
- Draw: 32S / 15D
- Prize money: $50,000
- Surface: Clay / outdoor
- Location: Orlando, Florida, U.S.
- Venue: Orlando Racquet Club

Champions

Singles
- (Czechoslovakia) Martina Navratilova

Doubles
- (France) Françoise Dürr / (Netherlands) Betty Stöve
- Barnett Bank Tennis Classic

The 1974 Barnett Bank Tennis Classic was a women's tennis tournament played on outdoor clay courts at the Orlando Racquet Club in Orlando, Florida in the United States. It was part of the USLTA Women's Circuit of the 1974 WTA Tour. It was the inaugural edition of the tournament and was held from September 22 through September 26, 1974. Unseeded 17-year old Martina Navratilova won the singles title after reaching her first WTA final and, as she was still an amateur, she had to hand over her $10,000 first-prize money to the Czechoslovak tennis federation.

== Finals ==
=== Singles ===
(Czechoslovakia) Martina Navratilova defeated (United States) Julie Heldman 7–6^{(5–4)}, 6–4

- It was Navratilova's first singles title of her career.

=== Doubles ===
(France) Françoise Dürr / (Netherlands) Betty Stöve defeated (United States) Rosie Casals / (United States) Billie Jean King 6–3, 6–7^{(2–5)}, 6–4

== Prize money ==
Event	W	F	3rd	4th	QF	Round of 16	Round of 32
Singles	$10,000	$5,600	$3,000	$2,600	$1,400	$700	$350
