= 1972 Virginia Slims of Newport =

- Date: August 22–26
- Edition: 2nd
- Draw: 32S / ?D
- Prize money: $18,000
- Surface: Grass / outdoor
- Location: Newport, Rhode Island, U.S.
- Venue: Newport Casino

Champions

Singles
- (Australia) Margaret Court

Doubles
- (Australia) Margaret Court / (Australia) Lesley Hunt
← 1971 ·	Virginia Slims of Newport	· 1973 →

The 1972 Virginia Slims of Newport, was a women's tennis tournament played on outdoor grass courts at the Newport Casino in Newport, Rhode Island in the United States that was part of the 1972 Virginia Slims World Championship Series. It was the second edition of the tournament and was held from August 22 through August 26, 1972. Sixth-seeded Margaret Court won the singles title and earned $3,400 first-prize money.

== Finals ==
=== Singles ===
(Australia) Margaret Court defeated (United States) Billie Jean King 6–4, 6–1

=== Doubles ===
(Australia) Margaret Court / (Australia) Lesley Hunt defeated (United States) Rosemary Casals / (United States) Billie Jean King 6–2, 6–2

== Prize money ==
Event	W	F	3rd	4th	QF	Round of 16	Round of 32
Singles	$3,400	$2,000	$1,600	$1,300	$750	$350	$150
