= 1973 Virginia Slims Grass Court Championships =

- Date: August 20–26
- Edition: 3rd
- Draw: 32S / ?D
- Prize money: $30,000
- Surface: Grass / outdoor
- Location: Newport, Rhode Island, U.S.
- Venue: Newport Casino

Champions

Singles
- (Australia) Margaret Court

Doubles
- (France) Françoise Dürr / (Netherlands) Betty Stöve
← 1972 ·	Virginia Slims of Newport	· 1974 →

The 1973 Virginia Slims Grass Court Championships, also known as the Virginia Slims of Newport, was a women's tennis tournament played on outdoor grass courts at the Newport Casino in Newport, Rhode Island in the United States that was part of the 1973 Virginia Slims World Championship Series. It was the third edition of the tournament and was held from August 20 through August 26, 1973. First-seeded Margaret Court won the singles title and earned $7,000 first-prize money.

== Finals ==
=== Singles ===
(Australia) Margaret Court defeated (United States) Julie Heldman 6–3, 6–2

=== Doubles ===
(France) Françoise Dürr / (Netherlands) Betty Stöve defeated (United States) Janet Newberry / (United States) Pam Teeguarden 6–4, 6–3

== Prize money ==
Event	W	F	3rd	4th	QF	Round of 16	Round of 32
Singles	$7,000	$3,500	$1,950	$1,650	$900	$450	$225
