= Deeside Leisure Centre =

Leisure centre in Flintshire, Wales

Coordinates: 53.2076°N 3.0267°W

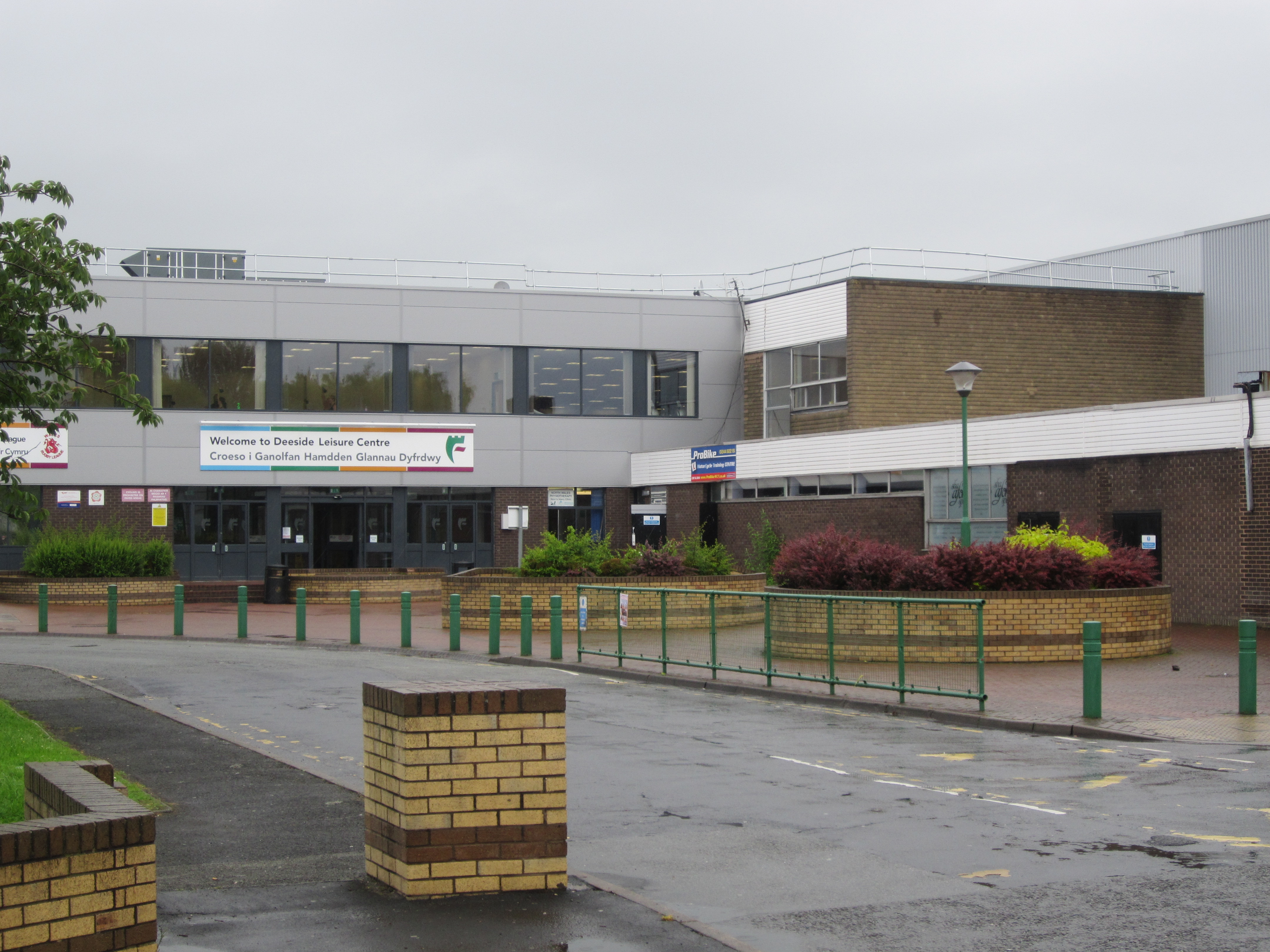
Deeside Leisure Centre

Deeside Leisure Centre is a sports centre located in Queensferry, Flintshire. Its facilities include Deeside Ice Rink (an Olympic-sized inline hockey rink), badminton courts, and squash courts.

The ice rink is the National Centre for Ice Sports in Wales and is home to the Deeside Dragons, the Flintshire Phantoms and the Deeside Demons ice hockey teams. There has also been a new indoor skate park and gym added to the Leisure Centre. The Centre was the venue for the 1974 Wightman Cup match.

== Administration ==
The Leisure Centre is run and controlled by Flintshire County Council which also governs similar leisure centres in towns such as Buckley, Mold and Connah's Quay. It offers an 'actif' membership which offers reduced admission prices over standard admission.

== Music Venue ==
As well as sports and sporting events, Deeside Leisure Centre has also been used as a venue for music events. Yes, Rush, AC/DC, Blondie and the Clash performed there in 1980; Genesis performed at the Centre in 1982; Iron Maiden performed there in 1980; and Bob Marley & The Wailers performed in 1980 as well.

== Deeside Rainbow Hospital ==
During the 2020-21 COVID-19 pandemic it was converted to the site of the Deeside Rainbow Hospital, and used as a vaccination centre.
