= 1974 Wightman Cup =

Women's Tennis Competition

Details
- Edition: 46th

Champion
- Winning nation: Great Britain

The 1974 Wightman Cup was the 46th edition of the annual women's team tennis competition between the United States and Great Britain. It was held at the Deeside Leisure Centre in Queensferry, Flintshire in Wales, United Kingdom.

Great Britain
6
Deeside Leisure Centre, Queensferry, Flintshire, Wales, United Kingdom
1974
Hard (Indoors)

United States
1

			1	2	3
1	(United Kingdom) (United States)	Virginia Wade; Julie Heldman	5; 7	9; 7	6; 4
2	(United Kingdom) (United States)	Glynis Coles; Janet Newberry	4; 6	6; 1	6; 3
3	(United Kingdom) (United States)	Sue Barker; Jeanne Evert	4; 6	6; 4	6; 1
4	(United Kingdom) (United States)	Sue Mappin / Lesley Charles; Betsy Nagelsen / Janet Newberry	4; 6	6; 2	6; 1
5	(United Kingdom) (United States)	Glynis Coles; Julie Heldman	6; 0	6; 4
6	(United Kingdom) (United States)	Virginia Wade; Janet Newberry	6; 1	6; 3
7	(United Kingdom) (United States)	Glynis Coles / Virginia Wade; Julie Heldman / Mona Schallau	5; 7	4; 6
