= 1963 Australian Championships – Women's singles =

Women's singles
- 1963 Australian Championships

Final
- Champion: (Australia) Margaret Smith
- Runner-up: (Australia) Jan Lehane
- Score: 6–2, 6–2

Details
- Draw: 39
- Seeds: 8

Events
Singles	men	women
Doubles	men	women
- Australian Championships

First-seeded Margaret Smith defeated Jan Lehane 6–2, 6–2 in the final to win the women's singles tennis title at the 1963 Australian Championships.

== Seeds ==
The seeded players are listed below. Margaret Smith is the champion; others show the round in which they were eliminated.

1. (Australia) Margaret Smith (champion)
2. (Australia) Lesley Turner (semifinals)
3. (Australia) Jan Lehane (finalist)
4. (United Kingdom) Christine Truman (second round)
5. (Australia) Robyn Ebbern (quarterfinals)
6. (United Kingdom) Elizabeth Starkie (quarterfinals)
7. (United Kingdom) Rita Bentley (quarterfinals)
8. (Australia) Madonna Schacht (quarterfinals)

== Draw ==
=== Key ===
- Q = Qualifier
- WC = Wild card
- LL = Lucky loser
- r = Retired

=== Finals ===
Quarterfinals
1	(Australia) Margaret Smith	6	6
7	(United Kingdom) Rita Bentley	1	3
(Australia) Kaye Dening	6	6
5	(Australia) Robyn Ebbern	2	4
8	(Australia) Madonna Schacht	1	4
3	(Australia) Jan Lehane	6	6
6	(United Kingdom) Elizabeth Starkie	2	6	2
2	(Australia) Lesley Turner	6	1	6

Semifinals
1	(Australia) Margaret Smith	6	6
5	(Australia) Kaye Dening	1	3
3	(Australia) Jan Lehane	5	6	6
2	(Australia) Lesley Turner	7	3	2

Finals
1	(Australia) Margaret Smith	6	6
3	(Australia) Jan Lehane	2	2

=== Earlier rounds ===
==== Section 1 ====
First round
(Australia) Ebbern	7	6
(Australia) Easy	5	3

Second round
1	(Australia) Smith	6	6
(Australia) Ebbern	0	0
(Australia) Muller	6	2
(Australia) Gibson	8	6
7	(United Kingdom) Bentley	6	6
(Australia) Schacht	2	2
(Australia) A Jenkins	6	2	8
(Australia) Marsh	4	6	6

Third round
1	(Australia) Smith	6	6
(Australia) Gibson	2	3
7	(United Kingdom) Bentley	9	6
(Australia) A Jenkins	7	1

Quarterfinals
1	(Australia) Smith	6	6
7	(United Kingdom) Bentley	1	3

==== Section 2 ====
First round
(Australia) Begbie	6	5	6
(Australia) Wicks	1	7	3
(Australia) Toohey	6	6
(Australia) Boucaut	0	2

Second round
4	(United Kingdom) Truman	w/o
(Australia) Begbie
(Australia) Dening
(Australia) Starr	w/o
5	(Australia) Ebbern	6	3	6
(Australia) Toohey	3	6	0
(Australia) Blackman	6	6
(Australia) Nette	1	1

Third round
(Australia) Begbie	6	1	3
(Australia) Dening	4	6	6
5	(Australia) Ebbern	6	6
(Australia) Blackman	2	4

Quarterfinals
(Australia) Dening	6	6
5	(Australia) Ebbern	2	4

==== Section 3 ====
First round
(Australia) McClenaughan	6	2	6
(Australia) Hart	2	6	1
(Australia) Bevis Hawton	6	6
(Australia) Paterson	2	3

Second round
(Australia) Plaisted	7	1
(Australia) Ross	9	6
(Australia) McClenaughan	3	3
8	(Australia) Schacht	6	6
(Australia) Sherriff	6	6
(Australia) Tegart	4	0
(Australia) Bevis Hawton	2	0
3	(Australia) Lehane	6	6

Third round
(Australia) Ross	3	1
8	(Australia) Schacht	6	6
(Australia) Sherriff	2	1
3	(Australia) Lehane	6	6

Quarterfinals
8	(Australia) Schacht	1	4
3	(Australia) Lehane	6	6

==== Section 4 ====
First round
(Australia) Don	6	6
(Australia) Serrurier	4	0
(Australia) Harris	6	6
(Australia) Pinch	1	2

Second round
(Australia) Newman	6	2
(Australia) Toyne	3	6	r
(Australia) Don	3	2
6	(United Kingdom) Starkie	6	6
(Australia) Thiele	w/o
(Australia) Melville
(Australia) Harris	2	3
2	(Australia) Turner	6	6

Third round
(Australia) Newman	2	6	1
6	(United Kingdom) Starkie	6	3	6
(Australia) Melville	3	0
2	(Australia) Turner	6	6

Quarterfinals
6	(United Kingdom) Starkie	2	6	2
2	(Australia) Turner	6	1	6

Preceded by 1962 U.S. National Championships – Women's singles	Grand Slam women's singles	Succeeded by 1963 French Championships – Women's singles
