= 1971 Virginia Slims Grass Court Championships =

Tennis tournament

- Date: August 24–29
- Edition: 1st
- Draw: 32S / 16D
- Prize money: $20,000
- Surface: Grass / outdoor
- Location: Newport, Rhode Island, U.S.
- Venue: Newport Casino

Champions

Singles
- (Australia) Kerry Melville

Doubles
- (Australia) Judy Dalton / (France) Françoise Dürr
Virginia Slims of Newport	· 1972 →

The 1971 Virginia Slims Grass Court Championships, also known as the Virginia Slims of Newport, was a women's tennis tournament played on outdoor grass courts at the Newport Casino in Newport, Rhode Island in the United States that was part of the 1971 Virginia Slims World Championship Series. It was the inaugural edition of the tournament and was held from August 24 through August 29, 1971. Fourth-seeded Kerry Melville won the singles title and earned $4,400 first-prize money. It is the only women's tournament to date where the singles title was decided by a sudden death nine point tiebreak.

== Finals ==
=== Singles ===
(Australia) Kerry Melville defeated (France) Françoise Dürr 6–3, 6–7^{(3–5)}, 7–6^{(5–4)}

=== Doubles ===
(Australia) Judy Dalton / (France) Françoise Dürr defeated (Australia) Kerry Harris / (Australia) Kerry Melville 6–2, 6–1

== Prize money ==
Event	W	F	3rd	4th	QF	Round of 16	Round of 32
Singles	$4,400	$2,800	$1,800	$1,500	$800	$300	$150
