= 1974 Virginia Slims of Chicago =

- Date: February 25 – March 3
- Edition: 3rd
- Category: Virginia Slims circuit
- Draw: 32S / 16D
- Prize money: $50,000
- Surface: Carpet (Sporteze) / indoor
- Location: Chicago, Illinois, US
- Venue: Lake Shore Racquet Club

Champions

Singles
- (United Kingdom) Virginia Wade

Doubles
- (United States) Chris Evert / (United States) Billie Jean King
- Virginia Slims of Chicago

The 1974 Virginia Slims of Chicago was a women's tennis tournament played on indoor carpet courts at the Lake Shore Racquet Club in Chicago, Illinois in the United States that was part of the 1974 Virginia Slims World Championship Series. It was the third edition of the tournament and was held from February 25 through March 3, 1974. Fourth-seeded Virginia Wade won the singles title and earned $10,000 first-prize money.

== Finals ==
=== Singles ===
(United Kingdom) Virginia Wade defeated (United States) Rosie Casals 2–6, 6–4, 6–4

=== Doubles ===
(United States) Chris Evert / (United States) Billie Jean King defeated (France) Françoise Dürr / (Netherlands) Betty Stöve 3–6, 6–4, 6–4

== Prize money ==
Event	W	F	SF	QF	Round of 16	Round of 32
Singles	$10,000	$5,600	$2,800	$1,400	$700	$350
