= 1974 John Player Tournament =

- Date: 17–22 June
- Edition: 1st
- Category: Women's International Circuit
- Draw: 48S / 24D
- Prize money: £9,825 ($23,520)
- Surface: Grass / outdoor
- Location: Eastbourne, United Kingdom
- Venue: Devonshire Park
- Attendance: 7,260

Champions

Singles
- (United States) Chris Evert

Doubles
- (Australia) Helen Gourlay / (Australia) Karen Krantzcke
| Eastbourne International | · 1975 → |

The 1974 John Player Tournament was a women's tennis tournament played on outdoor grass courts at Devonshire Park in Eastbourne, United Kingdom. The event was part of the Women's International circuit of the 1974 WTA Tour. It was the inaugural edition of the tournament and was held from 17 June through 22 June 1974. First-seeded Chris Evert won the singles title and earned £1,750 ($4,200) first-prize money.

== Finals ==
=== Singles ===
(United States) Chris Evert defeated (United Kingdom) Virginia Wade 7–5, 6–4

- It was Evert's 9th singles title of the year and the 32nd of her career.

=== Doubles ===
(Australia) Helen Gourlay / (Australia) Karen Krantzcke defeated (United States) Chris Evert / (Soviet Union) Olga Morozova 6–2, 6–0
