= Raz Reid =

American tennis player (born 1951)

- Full name: Grover Eugene Reid
- Country (sports): United States
- Born: August 27, 1951 (age 75) Greenville, South Carolina
- Turned pro: 1972
- Retired: 1977
- College: University of Miami

Singles
- Career record: 44–84
- Career titles: 0
- Highest ranking: No. 71 (November 6, 1974)

Grand Slam singles results
- Australian Open: 3R (1975)
- French Open: 1R (1976)
- Wimbledon: 2R (1975, 1976)
- US Open: 3R (1974)

Doubles
- Career record: 38–71
- Career titles: 2

Grand Slam doubles results
- Australian Open: 2R (1975)
- French Open: 2R (1976)
- Wimbledon: 2R (1974)
- US Open: 2R (1974, 1976)

Grand Slam mixed doubles results
- Wimbledon: QF (1977)
- US Open: 2R (1973, 1974, 1977)

Grover Eugene "Raz" Reid (born August 27, 1951) is a former professional tennis player from the United States. He was born Grover Reid Junior, but is known as Raz Reid, a nickname he has had since he was a young.

== Biography ==
=== Early years ===
Reid was a three-time South Carolina state high school champion, while at Greenville High School, in the city of his birth. He went to the University of Miami and twice earned All-American selection while playing varsity tennis, in 1971 and 1972.

=== Professional career ===
In 1972, his final year at Miami, he made he decision to delay his graduation and turned professional.

Reid made the semifinals at the 1973 International Indoor Tennis Championships, a USLTA Indoor Circuit tournament in Jackson, Mississippi. In the quarterfinals he defeated Clark Graebner. He also competed on the World Championship Tennis circuit. At a WCT tournament in Hempstead in 1974, Reid beat former French Open finalist Željko Franulović. He won two doubles titles in his career, both in the 1974 season, the first was a USLTA Indoor tournament in Jackson with Fred McNair and the second a Grand Prix event in Adelaide with Allan Stone.

His best Grand Slam singles performances were third round appearances at the 1974 US Open and 1975 Australian Open. He was eliminated at the Australian Open by Jimmy Connors, but won a set and was the only player to do so until Connors was beaten in the final by John Newcombe. He made the mixed doubles quarter-finals at the 1977 Wimbledon Championships with wife Kerry Reid and also finished runner-up in the All England Plate after a first-round elimination in the singles draw.

=== Personal life ===
Reid married Australian tennis player and Boston Lobsters teammate Kerry Melville in Greenville on April 27, 1975. He retired from professional tennis in 1977 to become Kerry's coach. After they both retired, Reid was the head tennis professional at Long Cove on Hilton Head Island for eight years. They have two daughters.

A keen fisherman, Reid holds world records in fly rod fishing and now works in the industry.

== Grand Prix career finals ==
=== Doubles: 2 (2–0) ===
Result	W-L	Year	Tournament	Surface	Partner	Opponent	Score
Win	1–0	Mar 1974	Jackson, United States	Carpet	(United States) Fred McNair	(South Africa) Byron Bertram (United Kingdom) John Feaver	3–6, 6–3, 6–3
Win	2–0	Oct 1974	Melbourne, Australia	Grass	(Australia) Allan Stone	(United States) Mike Estep (Australia) Paul Kronk	7–6, 6–4
