= 1974 US Open – Men's singles =

Men's singles
- 1974 US Open

Final
- Champion: (United States) Jimmy Connors
- Runner-up: (Australia) Ken Rosewall
- Score: 6–1, 6–0, 6–1

Details
- Draw: 128
- Seeds: 16

Events
Singles	men	women		boys	girls
Doubles	men	women	mixed	boys	girls
WC Singles	men	women	quad
WC Doubles	men	women	quad
Legends	men	women	mixed
← 1973 ·	US Open	· 1975 →

Jimmy Connors defeated Ken Rosewall in the final, 6–1, 6–0, 6–1 to win the men's singles tennis title at the 1974 US Open. It was his first US Open singles title and third major singles title overall. The final was the shortest-ever major men's singles final, both in number of games and duration, lasting only 1 hour and 18 minutes and 20 games. Rosewall remains the oldest major men's singles finalist, aged 39 years, 10 months and 6 days. Connors was the first player to win three majors in a season since Rod Laver in 1969 (he was banned from the fourth, the French Open, due to his being a member of World TeamTennis).

John Newcombe was the defending champion, but lost in the semifinals to Rosewall.

This was the last edition of the tournament to be played on grass courts; the following three years would feature clay courts, and afterwards hardcourts.

== Seeds ==
The seeded players are listed below. Jimmy Connors is the champion; others show the round in which they were eliminated.

1. (United States) Jimmy Connors (champion)
2. (Australia) John Newcombe (semifinalist)
3. (United States) Stan Smith (quarterfinalist)
4. (Sweden) Björn Borg (second round)
5. (Australia) Ken Rosewall (finalist)
6. (Netherlands) Tom Okker (fourth round)
7. (Romania) Ilie Năstase (third round)
8. (United States) Arthur Ashe (quarterfinalist)
9. (Argentina) Guillermo Vilas (fourth round)
10. (Spain) Manuel Orantes (second round)
11. (United States) Marty Riessen (fourth round)
12. (Czechoslovakia) Jan Kodeš (fourth round)
13. (Soviet Union) Alex Metreveli (quarterfinalist)
14. (United States) Dick Stockton (third round)
15. (United States) Tom Gorman (second round)
16. (Mexico) Raúl Ramírez (fourth round)

== Draw ==
=== Key ===
- Q = Qualifier
- WC = Wild card
- LL = Lucky loser
- r = Retired

=== Final eight ===
Quarterfinals
1	(United States) Jimmy Connors	3	6	6	6
13	(Soviet Union) Alex Metreveli	6	3	4	1
3	(United States) Stan Smith	6	2	6	1
(United States) Roscoe Tanner	7	6	3	6
5	(Australia) Ken Rosewall	2	6	6	6
(India) Vijay Amritraj	6	3	3	2
8	(United States) Arthur Ashe	6	3	6	6	4
2	(Australia) John Newcombe	4	6	3	7	6

Semifinals
1	(United States) Jimmy Connors	7	7	6
(United States) Roscoe Tanner	6	6	4
5	(Australia) Ken Rosewall	6	6	7	6
2	(Australia) John Newcombe	7	4	6	3

Final
1	(United States) Jimmy Connors	6	6	6
5	(Australia) Ken Rosewall	1	0	1

=== Section 1 ===
First round
1	(United States) J Connors	6	6	3	7
(United States) J Borowiak	3	4	6	5
(Australia) D Crealy	6	6	6	6
(Sweden) O N Bengtson	7	7	4	7
(Australia) J Alexander	6	6	6
(France) J-F Caujolle	1	2	0
(Australia) R Case	5	6	3	4
(Australia) B Carmichael	7	2	6	6
12	(Czechoslovakia) J Kodeš	6	6	6
(South Africa) P Cramer	4	4	2
(United States) D Dell	6	3	5	6	7
(United States) D R Bohrnstedt	4	6	7	4	6
(United Kingdom) G Battrick	6	6	6
(United States) B Manson	4	2	1
(West Germany) K Meiler	7	3	2	2
(Hungary) B Taróczy	6	6	6	6

Second round
1	(United States) J Connors	6	6	6
(Sweden) O N Bengtson	1	3	3
(Australia) J Alexander	6	7	6
(Australia) B Carmichael	4	5	3
12	(Czechoslovakia) J Kodeš	6	6	6
(United States) D Dell	4	4	2
(United Kingdom) G Battrick	6	6	3
(Hungary) B Taróczy	7	7	6

Third round
1	(United States) J Connors	6	7	6	6
(Australia) J Alexander	1	5	7	4
12	(Czechoslovakia) J Kodeš	5	4	7	7	6
(Hungary) B Taróczy	7	6	6	6	3

Fourth round
1	(United States) J Connors	7	6	5	6
12	(Czechoslovakia) J Kodeš	5	3	7	2

=== Section 2 ===
First round
6	(Netherlands) T Okker	5	6	7	6
(United States) E van Dillen	7	1	5	2
(United States) B Seewagen	3	6	6	6
(United States) H Bunis	6	3	3	4
(Australia) O Davidson	6	6	6	6
(Australia) P Kronk	7	3	2	2
(Brazil) T Koch	7	6	6
(Chile) A Cornejo	5	1	3
13	(Soviet Union) A Metreveli	6	6	6
(France) J-B Chanfreau	3	2	2
(United States) B Martin	3	2	6	3
(Czechoslovakia) V Zednik	6	6	1	6
(Czechoslovakia) J Hřebec	3	3	6	6	6
(United States) J Whitlinger	6	6	2	3	3
(United Kingdom) M Cox	6	7	3	1	7
(United States) J Austin	3	6	6	6	6

Second round
6	(Netherlands) T Okker	7	7	6
(United States) B Seewagen	6	6	2
(Australia) O Davidson	3	6	5
(Brazil) T Koch	6	7	7
13	(Soviet Union) A Metreveli	6	7	6
(Czechoslovakia) V Zednik	3	5	4
(Czechoslovakia) J Hřebec	1	2	6
(United Kingdom) M Cox	6	6	7

Third round
6	(Netherlands) T Okker	4	6	6	5	6
(Brazil) T Koch	6	2	3	7	4
13	(Soviet Union) A Metreveli	6	6	6	7	6
(United Kingdom) M Cox	7	2	7	6	3

Fourth round
6	(Netherlands) T Okker	1	3	6
13	(Soviet Union) A Metreveli	6	6	7

=== Section 3 ===
First round
3	(United States) S Smith	3	6	5	7	7
(Chile) J Fillol	6	3	7	5	6
(South Africa) F McMillan	6	6	6
(United States) J McManus	4	2	4
(West Germany) H J Pohmann	3	5	2
(United States) B Gottfried	6	7	6
(Chile) P Cornejo	7	3	3	r
(United States) B Teacher	6	6	6
10	(Spain) M Orantes	6	7	6
(Czechoslovakia) F Pála	4	5	4
(India) A Amritraj	7	6	4	6
(Rhodesia) A Pattison	6	4	6	3
(Colombia) I Molina	1	3	3
(Australia) S Ball	6	6	6
(Chile) J Pinto-Bravo	1	2	1
(France) G Goven	6	6	6

Second round
3	(United States) S Smith	6	3	7	6
(South Africa) F McMillan	1	6	6	4
(United States) B Gottfried	6	6	3	2	2
(United States) B Teacher	3	2	6	6	6
10	(Spain) M Orantes	3	4	2
(India) A Amritraj	6	6	6
(Australia) S Ball	6	7	6
(France) G Goven	3	5	3

Third round
3	(United States) S Smith	6	7	6
(United States) B Teacher	3	5	4
(India) A Amritraj	7	7	3	2	4
(Australia) S Ball	5	5	6	6	6

Fourth round
3	(United States) S Smith	6	6	6	6
(Australia) S Ball	2	3	7	3

=== Section 4 ===
First round
7	(Romania) I Năstase	6	6
(Australia) K Warwick	2	4	r
(United States) R Barth	6	6	7
(Australia) J Bartlett	1	0	5
(United Kingdom) R Taylor	7	7	6
(Australia) A Stone	6	6	3
(United States) M Estep	4	6	3	6
(United States) R Tanner	6	4	6	7
14	(United States) D Stockton	6	6	6
(United States) J Delaney	2	1	1
(United States) T Edlefsen	7	3	0	0
(United States) R Kreiss	6	6	6	6
(Socialist Federal Republic of Yugoslavia) N Špear	3	3	2
(Egypt) I El Shafei	6	6	6
(United States) S Turner	6	5	3
(Australia) I Fletcher	7	7	6

Second round
7	(Romania) Năstase	6	6	4	6	6
(United States) Barth	7	1	6	1	2
(United Kingdom) R Taylor	6	7	4	6	3
(United States) R Tanner	3	6	6	7	6
14	(United States) D Stockton	6	6	6	6
(United States) R Kreiss	7	3	3	2
(Egypt) I El Shafei	7	6	6
(Australia) I Fletcher	6	1	4

Third round
7	(Romania) I Năstase	6	7	5	4	4
(United States) R Tanner	4	6	7	6	6
14	(United States) D Stockton	6	6	3	6	4
(Egypt) I El Shafei	4	7	6	3	6

Fourth round
(United States) R Tanner	6	6	7	6	7
(Egypt) I El Shafei	3	7	5	7	6

=== Section 5 ===
First round
(United States) C Pasarell	6	6	4	6	6
(United States) P DuPré	7	3	6	2	4
(United States) S Stewart	6	5	6	0	3
(United States) G Scott	2	7	4	6	6
(Australia) R Ruffels	7	4	4	1
(United States) B Lutz	6	6	6	6
(Australia) C Dibley	4	6	1
5	(Australia) K Rosewall	6	7	6
(United States) G R Reid	6	7	6
(Japan) J Kuki	4	6	3
(Australia) B Phillips-Moore	7	2	2	1
(United States) S Mayer	5	6	6	6
(Czechoslovakia) M Holeček	7	6	5	4	r
(United States) W Brown	6	2	7	6
(Venezuela) J Andrew	2	4	4
16	(Mexico) R Ramírez	6	6	6

Second round
(United States) C Pasarell	4	6	7	6
(United States) G Scott	6	4	6	3
(United States) B Lutz	6	3	3
5	(Australia) K Rosewall	7	6	6
(United States) G R Reid	3	5	7
(United States) S Mayer	6	7	6	r
(United States) W Brown	6	6	6
16	(Mexico) R Ramírez	7	7	7

Third round
(United States) C Pasarell	1	2	6	4
5	(Australia) K Rosewall	6	6	4	6
(United States) G R Reid	1	4	6	3
16	(Mexico) R Ramírez	6	6	3	6

Fourth round
5	(Australia) K Rosewall	6	6	7	6
16	(Mexico) R Ramírez	1	7	5	3

=== Section 6 ===
First round
(Rhodesia) R Dowdeswell	6	3	6	6
(United Kingdom) M Farrell	2	6	2	4
(United States) C Owens	7	6	6
(Austria) H Kary	6	4	4
(Pakistan) H Rahim	4	4	2
(United Kingdom) J Lloyd	6	6	6
(United States) S Krulevitz	7	6	2	2	0
11	(United States) M Riessen	6	3	6	6	6
(South Africa) T Ryan	1	4	0	r
(South Africa) J Yuill	6	6	1
(United States) D Crawford	5	4	2
(Spain) J Gisbert	7	6	6
(India) V Amritraj	6	6	6	6
(Australia) S Docherty	7	1	3	2
(United States) V Amaya	4	6	3	3
4	(Sweden) B Borg	6	4	6	6

Second round
(Rhodesia) R Dowdeswell	6	2	6
(United States) C Owens	7	6	7
(United Kingdom) J Lloyd	3	4	2
11	(United States) M Riessen	6	6	6
(South Africa) J Yuill	6	6	1	7	6
(Spain) J Gisbert	2	7	6	6	3
(India) V Amritraj	6	7	3	1	6
4	(Sweden) B Borg	1	6	6	6	2

Third round
(United States) C Owens	4	3	0
11	(United States) M Riessen	6	6	6
(South Africa) J Yuill	6	6	6	7	1r
(India) V Amritraj	7	0	7	6	3

Fourth round
11	(United States) M Riessen	3	3	4
(India) V Amritraj	6	6	6

=== Section 7 ===
First round
(United States) P Gerken	6	6	7	7
(New Zealand) J Simpson	4	7	5	6
(United States) A Neely	6	6	6	4	7
(Japan) J Kamiwazumi	4	7	2	6	5
(United States) M Machette	6	6	6
(Chile) B Prajoux	4	4	2
(United States) F Taygan	3	2	7	6	3
9	(Argentina) G Vilas	6	6	6	2	6
(United States) S Messmer	3	6	3	6
(United States) F McNair	6	3	6	7
(Australia) G Masters	2	6	6	6
(Colombia) J Velasco	6	2	1	3
(United Kingdom) J Feaver	6	3	6	1
(United States) V Gerulaitis	3	6	7	6
(United States) T Waltke	3	6	2
8	(United States) A Ashe	6	7	6

Second round
(United States) P Gerken	6	6	6
(United States) A Neely	4	4	2
(United States) M Machette	3	2	1
9	(Argentina) G Vilas	6	6	6
(United States) F McNair	3	3	6
(Australia) G Masters	6	6	7
(United States) V Gerulaitis	6	5	2
8	(United States) A Ashe	7	7	6

Third round
(United States) P Gerken	4	3	1	r
9	(Argentina) G Vilas	6	6	3
(Australia) G Masters	6	2	3	3
8	(United States) A Ashe	2	6	6	6

Fourth round
9	(Argentina) G Vilas	7	4	4	5
8	(United States) A Ashe	6	6	6	7

=== Section 8 ===
First round
(United States) C Graebner	6	6	7
(Denmark) T Ulrich	3	1	5
(Spain) A Muñoz	4	6	6	7	7
(United States) J Andrews	6	7	2	6	6
(India) J Singh	1	4	2
(South Africa) R Moore	6	6	6
(United States) G Hardie	6	4	2
15	(United States) T Gorman	7	6	6
(New Zealand) O Parun	6	6	6
(United States) E Friedler	1	1	1
(Australia) T Roche	6	6	6
(Australia) J James	3	3	1
(Soviet Union) T Kakoulia	6	6	6
(Brazil) L F Tavares	2	3	3
(Bolivia) R Benavides	2	0	1
2	(Australia) J Newcombe	6	6	6

Second round
(United States) C Graebner	1	6	3	6	6
(Spain) A Muñoz	6	4	6	2	2
(South Africa) R Moore	4	6	6	6	7
15	(United States) T Gorman	6	4	7	4	5
(New Zealand) O Parun	4	4	4
(Australia) T Roche	6	6	6
(Soviet Union) T Kakoulia	6	2	2
2	(Australia) J Newcombe	7	6	6

Third round
(United States) C Graebner	1	4	3
(South Africa) R Moore	6	6	6
(Australia) T Roche	6	6	3	5
2	(Australia) J Newcombe	4	7	6	7

Fourth round
(South Africa) R Moore	3	2	5
2	(Australia) J Newcombe	6	6	7

Preceded by 1974 Wimbledon Championships – Men's singles	Grand Slam men's singles	Succeeded by 1975 Australian Open – Men's singles
