= 1963 Australian Championships =

- Date: 10-19 January 1963
- Edition: 51st
- Category: Grand Slam (ITF)
- Surface: Grass
- Location: Adelaide, Australia
- Venue: Memorial Drive

Champions

Men's singles
- (Australia) Roy Emerson

Women's singles
- (Australia) Margaret Smith

Men's doubles
- (Australia) Bob Hewitt / (Australia) Fred Stolle

Women's doubles
- (Australia) Margaret Smith / (Australia) Robyn Ebbern

Mixed doubles
- (Australia) Margaret Smith / (Australia) Ken Fletcher
- Australian Championships

The 1963 Australian Championships was a tennis tournament that took place on outdoor Grass courts at the Memorial Drive, Adelaide, Australia from 10 January to 19 January. It was the 51st edition of the Australian Championships (now known as the Australian Open), the 13th held in Adelaide, and the first Grand Slam tournament of the year.

== Champions ==
=== Men's singles ===
(Australia) Roy Emerson defeated (Australia) Ken Fletcher 6–3, 6–3, 6–1

=== Women's singles ===
(Australia) Margaret Smith defeated (Australia) Jan Lehane 6–2, 6–2

=== Men's doubles ===
(Australia) Bob Hewitt / (Australia) Fred Stolle defeated (Australia) Ken Fletcher / (Australia) John Newcombe 6–2, 1–6, 6–3, 3–6, 6–3

=== Women's doubles ===
(Australia) Robyn Ebbern / (Australia) Margaret Smith defeated (Australia) Jan Lehane / (Australia) Lesley Turner 6–1, 6–3

=== Mixed doubles ===
(Australia) Margaret Smith / (Australia) Ken Fletcher defeated (Australia) Lesley Turner / (Australia) Fred Stolle 7–5, 5–7, 6–4

Preceded by 1962 U.S. National Championships	Grand Slams	Succeeded by 1963 French Championships
