= Trish Faulkner =

Australian-American tennis player

- Full name: Patricia Faulkner (nee McClenaughan)
- Country (sports): Australia
- Born: 28 August 1945 (age 79); Sydney, Australia
- Plays: Right-handed

Singles

Grand Slam singles results
- Australian Open: 2R (1963)
- French Open: 3R (1965)
- Wimbledon: 3R (1965)
- US Open: 3R (1970)

Doubles

Grand Slam doubles results
- French Open: QF (1965)
- Wimbledon: 3R (1973)
- US Open: 1R (1970, 1971, 1974)

Patricia Faulkner (born 28 August 1945) is an Australian-American former professional tennis player.

== Biography ==
Born in Sydney, Faulkner is the daughter of St. George rugby union player Terry McClenaughan, who later served as team manager for the Wallabies. She won the girls' doubles title at the 1963 Australian Championships and was also a junior national champion in the sport of squash.

Faulkner played on the international tour in the 1960s and 1970s, featuring in all four grand slam tournaments. She was a women's doubles quarter-finalist at the 1965 French Championships, partnering Fay Toyne. Her best singles results were third round appearances, including at the 1965 Wimbledon Championships. In 1974 she beat future French Open winner Virginia Ruzici in the first round of the US Open.

While competing on tour, Faulkner permanently relocated to the United States with her British husband and was initially based in Detroit, but is now in Florida. She is a recipient of the WTA Player Service Award.
