= Tine Zwaan =

Dutch tennis player

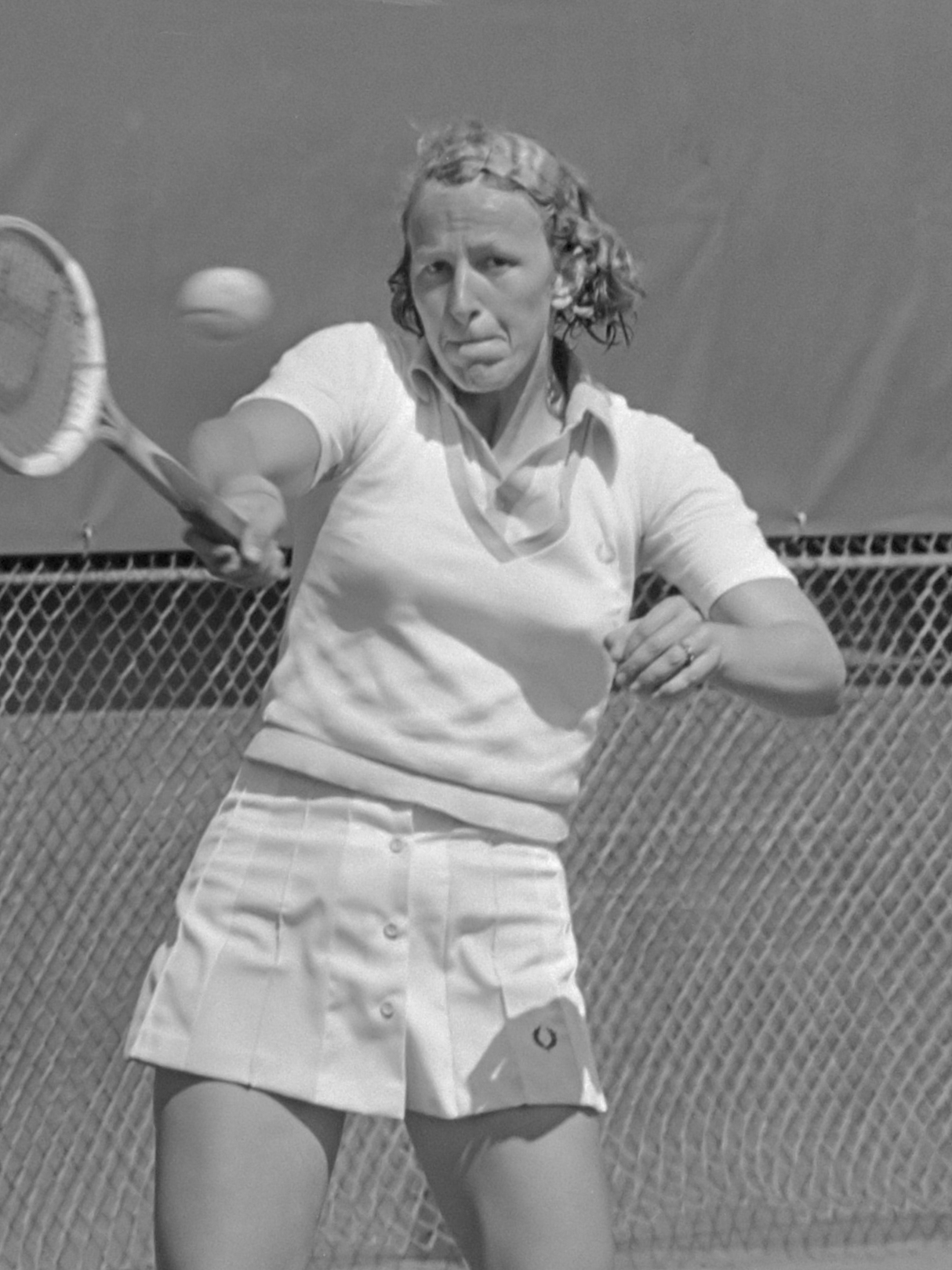
- Zwaan in 1974
- Country (sports): Netherlands
- Born: 17 June 1947 (age 78)
- Plays: Right-handed

Singles

Grand Slam singles results
- Wimbledon: 3R (1974)
- US Open: 2R (1974, 1975)

Doubles

Grand Slam doubles results
- Wimbledon: 1R (1975)
- US Open: 2R (1974)

Grand Slam mixed doubles results
- Wimbledon: 3R (1974)
Medal record
Representing Netherlands
Summer Universiade
Gold medal – first place	1970 Turin	Women's doubles

Tine Zwaan (born 17 June 1947) is a Dutch former professional tennis player.

== Biography ==
Zwaan, a 1970 Universiade doubles gold medalist, competed on the professional tour in the 1970s and represented the Netherlands in a total of nine Federation Cup ties.

In 1973, Zwaan earned a place in the end of year Virginia Slims Championships.

Her best performance at grand slam level came at the 1974 Wimbledon Championships, where she made the third round of both the singles and mixed doubles.

During her Federation Cup career she featured mostly as a doubles player and partnered with Betty Stöve to win over Denmark in the deciding doubles rubber of a World Group quarter-final in 1976, setting up a semi-final against the United States. The Dutch were beaten in all rubbers by the Americans in the semi-finals, with Zwaan featuring in doubles.

== See also ==
- List of Netherlands Fed Cup team representatives
