= Sue Mappin =

British tennis player

- Country (sports): Great Britain
- Born: 7 November 1947 (age 77); Sheffield, England
- Plays: Right-handed

Singles
- Career titles: 0

Grand Slam singles results
- Australian Open: 2R (1975)
- French Open: 3R (1977)
- Wimbledon: 2R (1973, 1974, 1975, 1976, 1978)
- US Open: 3R (1974)

Doubles
- Career titles: 6

Grand Slam doubles results
- Australian Open: QF (1975)
- French Open: SF (1977)
- Wimbledon: SF (1976, 1977)
- US Open: QF (1977)

Grand Slam mixed doubles results
- Wimbledon: 3R (1974)

Team competitions
- Wightman Cup: W (1974, 1978)

Sue Mappin (born 7 November 1947) is a former tennis player from Great Britain who was active in the 1960s and 1970s.

Mappin won the British under-21 championships in 1966.

During her career, Mappin competed at all four Grand Slam tournaments. Her best singles performance was reaching the third round at the 1974 US Open and the 1977 French Open. The second round was also her best result at the Australian Open which she achieved in 1975.

In Grand Slam doubles, Mappin made it to the semifinals on three occasions; at the French Open in 1977 and at Wimbledon in 1976 and 1977, each time with compatriot Lesley Charles.

Mappin was a member of the British team that competed in the Wightman Cup in 1974, 1976, 1977, and 1978. In all editions, she played one doubles match and compiled a 1–3 win–loss record. Her win in 1974, teaming with Lesley Charles, contributed to the victory for the British team.

In 1974, Mappin won 15 doubles titles with Charles, mainly on the British circuit. That year, she played half a season for the Indiana Loves in World TeamTennis. She won the BP New Zealand championships in 1975, defeating Evonne Goolagong in the quarterfinal and doubles partner Charles in the final.

After her retirement as a player in 1978, she joined the Lawn Tennis Association as national women's team manager. Later, she became head of the Cliff Richard Tennis Development Trust, a charity to provide tennis opportunities for children. In 2011, she received the LTWA Award from the Lawn Tennis Writers Association.
