= 1974 US Open (tennis) =

- Date: August 26 – September 8
- Edition: 94th
- Category: Grand Slam (ITF)
- Surface: Grass
- Location: Forest Hills, Queens, New York, United States
- Venue: West Side Tennis Club

Champions

Men's singles
- (United States) Jimmy Connors

Women's singles
- (United States) Billie Jean King

Men's doubles
- (United States) Bob Lutz / (United States) Stan Smith

Women's doubles
- (United States) Rosemary Casals / (United States) Billie Jean King

Mixed doubles
- (United States) Pam Teeguarden / (Australia) Geoff Masters
- US Open

The 1974 US Open was a tennis tournament that took place on the outdoor grass courts at the West Side Tennis Club in Forest Hills, Queens, in New York City in the United States. The tournament was held from August 26 until September 8, 1974. It was the 94th staging of the US Open, and the fourth Grand Slam tennis event of 1974. The girls’ championship was introduced in 1974, and it was the last year the tournament was played on grass courts. Jimmy Connors and Billie Jean King won the singles titles.

== Seniors ==
=== Men's singles ===
(United States) Jimmy Connors defeated (Australia) Ken Rosewall, 6–1, 6–0, 6–1

- It was Connors 3rd career Grand Slam title, and his 1st US Open title. Connors' victory took just over an hour.

=== Women's singles ===
(United States) Billie Jean King defeated (Australia) Evonne Goolagong, 3–6, 6–3, 7–5

- It was King's 11th career Grand Slam title, her 7th during the Open Era, and her 4th (and last) US Open title.

=== Men's doubles ===
(United States) Bob Lutz / (United States) Stan Smith defeated (Chile) Patricio Cornejo / (Chile) Jaime Fillol, 6–3, 6–3

=== Women's doubles ===
(United States) Rosemary Casals / (United States) Billie Jean King defeated (France) Françoise Dürr / (Netherlands) Betty Stöve, 7–6, 6–7, 6–4

=== Mixed doubles ===
(United States) Pam Teeguarden / (Australia) Geoff Masters defeated (United States) Chris Evert / (United States) Jimmy Connors, 6–1, 7–6

== Juniors ==
=== Boys' singles ===
(United States) Billy Martin defeated (United States) Ferdi Taygan, 6–4, 6–2

=== Girls' singles ===
(South Africa) Ilana Kloss defeated (Socialist Federal Republic of Yugoslavia) Mima Jaušovec, 6–4, 6–3

| Preceded by 1974 Wimbledon Championships | Grand Slams | Succeeded by 1975 Australian Open |
