= Mark Farrell (tennis) =

British tennis player

- Country (sports): (United Kingdom) Great Britain
- Born: 6 May 1953 Liverpool, England
- Died: 26 November 2018 (aged 65)
- Plays: Left-handed

Singles
- Career record: 11–38
- Career titles: 0
- Highest ranking: No. 120 (20 Dec 1974)

Grand Slam singles results
- Australian Open: 2R (1974)
- French Open: 1R (1975)
- Wimbledon: 2R (1976)
- US Open: 1R (1974)

Doubles
- Career record: 13–31
- Career titles: 0

Grand Slam doubles results
- Australian Open: 2R (1973)
- French Open: 1R (1973)
- Wimbledon: 2R (1973)
- US Open: 1R (1974)

Mixed doubles

Grand Slam mixed doubles results
- Wimbledon: F (1974)
- US Open: QF (1974)

Mark Farrell (6 May 1953 – 26 November 2018) was a British professional tennis player.

== Career ==
Farrell and Lesley Charles were mixed doubles finalists at the 1974 Wimbledon Championships. In 1974, he was also a losing finalist at a WCT event in London and represented Great Britain in a Davis Cup tie against Iran. He played the doubles rubber with John Lloyd, and they won. Farrell scored a win against Björn Borg at the 1973 NSW Championships. Two years later, he scored a victory over Stan Smith at Nottingham.

== Grand Slam finals ==
=== Mixed doubles: 1 (0–1) ===
Result	W/L	Year	Cha,pionship	Surface	Partner	Opponents	Score
Loss	0–1	1974	Wimbledon	Grass	(United Kingdom) Lesley Charles	(Australia) Owen Davidson (United States) Billie Jean King	3–6, 7–9

== WCT career finals ==
=== Doubles: 1 (0–1) ===
Result	W/L	Date	Tournament	Surface	Partner	Opponents	Score
Loss	0–1	Feb 1974	London, Great Britain	Hard	(United Kingdom) John Lloyd	(Sweden) Ove Nils Bengtson (Sweden) Björn Borg	6–7, 3–6
