= Lesley Charles =

British tennis player (born 1952)

- Country (sports): United Kingdom
- Born: 15 July 1952 (age 72); Worcester, England

Singles
- Career titles: 1

Grand Slam singles results
- Australian Open: 3R (1973, 1975)
- French Open: 2R (1977)
- Wimbledon: 4R (1974)
- US Open: 1R (1974, 1975, 1977)

Doubles
- Career titles: 10

Grand Slam doubles results
- Australian Open: QF (1973, 1975)
- French Open: SF (1977)
- Wimbledon: SF (1976, 1977)
- US Open: QF (1977)

Grand Slam mixed doubles results
- Wimbledon: F (1974)
- US Open: QF (1974)

Team competitions
- Wightman Cup: W (1974)

Lesley Charles (born 15 July 1952) is a former tennis player from the UK. In 1973 and 1975 she competed in the Australian Open. Charles was a Wimbledon mixed doubles runner-up in 1974, with compatriot Mark Farrell, losing in straight sets to Owen Davidson and Billie Jean King.

In 1974, Charles won 15 doubles titles with Sue Mappin, mainly on the British circuit.

== Grand Slam finals ==
=== Mixed doubles (1 runner-up) ===
Result	Year	Championship	Surface	Partner	Opponents	Score
Loss	1974	Wimbledon	Grass	(United Kingdom) Mark Farrell	(United States) Billie Jean King (Australia) Owen Davidson	3–6, 7–9
