= Peggy Michel =

American tennis player

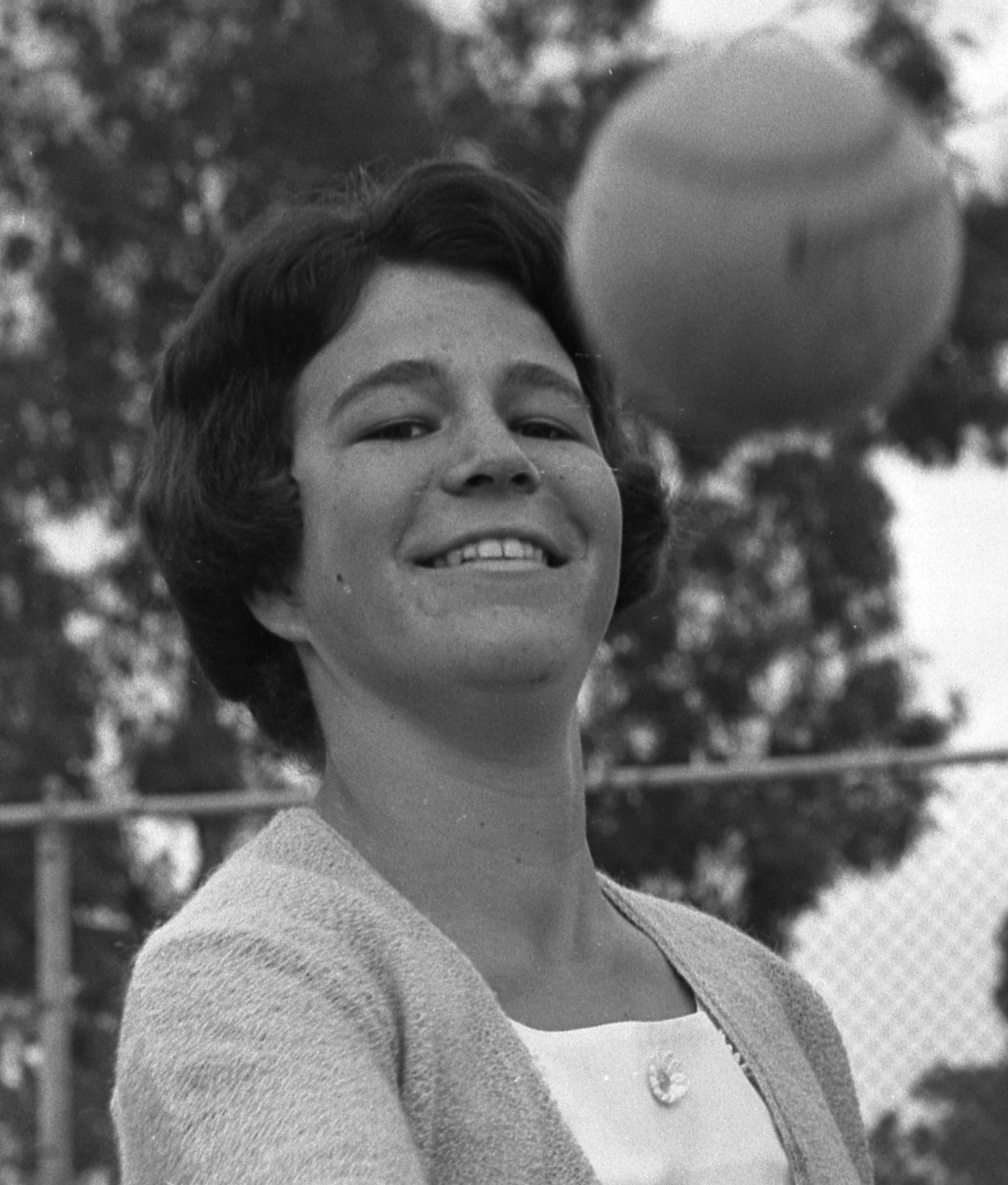
- Michel in 1965 at the Rancho Park International Junior Tennis Championships
- Full name: Margaret Michel
- Country (sports): United States
- Born: February 2, 1949 (age 77) Santa Monica, California

Singles
- Career record: 16–14

Grand Slam singles results
- Australian Open: 3R (1974, 1975)
- Wimbledon: 4R (1969, 1973)
- US Open: 3R (1969)

Doubles
- Career record: 30–10
- Career titles: 9

Grand Slam doubles results
- Australian Open: W (1974, 1975)
- Wimbledon: W (1974)
- US Open: SF (1974)

Mixed doubles

Grand Slam mixed doubles results
- Wimbledon: 2R (1969, 1970, 1973, 1976)
- US Open: SF (1968)

Margaret "Peggy" Michel (born February 2, 1949) is a former professional tennis player from the U.S. She was a doubles specialist who won three Grand Slam titles, all with Evonne Goolagong.

She was born in Santa Monica, California.

== Grand Slam finals ==
=== Doubles 4 (3–1) ===
Result	Year	Championship	Surface	Partner	Opponents	Score
Loss	1969	Wimbledon	Grass	(United States) Patti Hogan	(Australia) Margaret Court (Australia) Judy Tegart Dalton	7–9, 2–6
Win	1974	Australian Open	Grass	(Australia) Evonne Goolagong	(Australia) Kerry Melville (Australia) Kerry Harris	7–5, 6–3
Win	1974	Wimbledon	Grass	(Australia) Evonne Goolagong	(Australia) Helen Gourlay (Australia) Karen Krantzcke	2–6, 6–4, 6–3
Win	1975	Australian Open	Grass	(Australia) Evonne Goolagong	(Australia) Margaret Court (Soviet Union) Olga Morozova	7–6, 7–6

== Career finals ==
=== Doubles (9 titles) ===
Result	W–L	Date	Tournament	Surface	Partner	Opponents	Score
Win	1–0	Mar 1969	Phoenix, US	Hard	(United States) Patti Hogan	(South Africa) Esmé Emmanuel (United States) Cecilia Martinez	3–6, 6–3, 6–1
Loss	1–1	Jul 1969	Wimbledon	Grass	(United States) Patti Hogan	(Australia) Margaret Court (Australia) Judy Tegart Dalton	7–9, 2–6
Win	2–1	Jun 1970	Beckenham, UK	Grass	(United States) Patti Hogan	(Australia) Patricia Edwards (Australia) Evonne Goolagong	6–3, 6–4
Win	3–1	Aug 1973	Canadian Open, Toronto	Clay	(Australia) Evonne Goolagong	(France) Gail Chanfreau (Czech Republic) Martina Navratilova	6–3, 6–2
Win	4–1	Jan 1974	Australian Open, Melbourne	Grass	(Australia) Evonne Goolagong	(Australia) Kerry Harris (Australia) Kerry Melville	7–5, 6–3
Win	5–1	Jul 1974	Wimbledon	Grass	(Australia) Evonne Goolagong	(Australia) Helen Gourlay (Australia) Karen Krantzcke	2–6, 6–3, 6–4
Win	6–1	Dec 1974	Brisbane, Australia	Grass	(Australia) Evonne Goolagong	(Australia) Vicki Lancaster (United States) Ceci Martinez	6–1, 6–2
Win	7–1	Dec 1974	Adelaide, Australia	Grass	(Australia) Evonne Goolagong	(Czech Republic) Martina Navratilova (Japan) Kazuko Sawamatsu	6–3, 4–6, 7–5
Win	8–1	Dec 1974	Sydney, Australia	Grass	(Australia) Evonne Goolagong	(Soviet Union) Olga Morozova (Czech Republic) Martina Navratilova	6–7, 6–4, 6–1
Win	9–1	Jan 1975	Australian Open, Melbourne	Grass	(Australia) Evonne Goolagong	(Australia) Margaret Court (Soviet Union) Olga Morozova	7–6, 7–6
