= 1973 in tennis =

This page covers all the important events in the sport of tennis in 1973. It provides the results of notable tournaments throughout the year on both the men's and the women's tennis circuits.

== Australian Open ==
Category	Champion(s)	Finalist(s)	Score
Men's singles	(Australia) John Newcombe	(New Zealand) Onny Parun	6–3, 6–7, 7–5, 6–1 (Note: It was Newcombe's 5th career Grand Slam title, and his 1st Australian Open title.)
Women's singles	(Australia) Margaret Court	(Australia) Evonne Goolagong	6–4, 7–5
Men's doubles	(Australia) John Newcombe (Australia) Malcolm Anderson	(Australia) John Alexander (Australia) Phil Dent	6–3, 6–4, 7–6
Women's doubles	(Australia) Margaret Court (United Kingdom) Virginia Wade	(Australia) Kerry Harris (Australia) Kerry Melville	6–4, 6–4
Mixed doubles	Competition not held between 1970 and 1986.		

== French Open ==
Category	Champion(s)	Finalist(s)	Score
Men's singles	(Romania) Ilie Năstase (Note: Năstase did not lose a set during the entire tournament.)	(Socialist Federal Republic of Yugoslavia) Nikola Pilić	6–3, 6–3, 6–0 (Note: It was Năstase's 2nd and last career Grand Slam singles title and his 1st and only title at the French Open.)
Women's singles	(Australia) Margaret Court	(United States) Chris Evert, (Note: This was Evert's first Grand Slam singles final)	6–7, 7–6, 6–4 (Note: It was Court's 23rd career Grand Slam singles title, her 10th in the Open Era and her 5th and last title at the French Open.)
Men's doubles	(Australia) John Newcombe (Netherlands) Tom Okker	(United States) Jimmy Connors (Romania) Ilie Năstase	6–1, 3–6, 6–3, 5–7, 6–4 (Note: It was Newcombe's 14th career Grand Slam doubles title and his 3rd and last title at the French Open.) (Note: It was Okker's 1st career Grand Slam doubles title and his 1st and only title at the French Open.)
Women's doubles	(Australia) Margaret Court (United Kingdom) Virginia Wade	(France) Françoise Dürr (Netherlands) Betty Stöve	6–2, 6–3 (Note: It was Court's 17th career Grand Slam doubles title, her 8th during the Open Era and her 4th and last title at the French Open.) (Note: It was Wade's 2nd career Grand Slam doubles title and her 1st and only title at the French Open.)
Mixed doubles	(France) Françoise Dürr (France) Jean-Claude Barclay	(Netherlands) Betty Stöve (France) Patrice Dominguez	6–1, 6–4 (Note: It was Dürr's 3rd career Grand Slam mixed doubles title and her 3rd and last title at the French Open.) (Note: It was Barclay's 3rd and last career Grand Slam mixed doubles title and his 3rd title at the French Open.)

== Wimbledon ==
Category	Champion(s)	Finalist(s)	Score
Men's singles	(Czechoslovakia) Jan Kodeš	(Soviet Union) Alex Metreveli	6–1, 9–8^{(7–5)}, 6–3
Women's singles	(United States) Billie Jean King	(United States) Chris Evert	6–0, 7–5 (Note: It was King's 10th career Grand Slam title (her 6th in the Open Era), and her 5th Wimbledon title.)
Men's doubles	(United States) Jimmy Connors (Romania) Ilie Năstase	(Australia) John Cooper (Australia) Neale Fraser	3–6, 6–3, 6–4, 8–9^{(3–7)}, 6–1
Women's doubles	(United States) Rosemary Casals (United States) Billie Jean King	(France) Françoise Dürr (Netherlands) Betty Stöve	6–1, 4–6, 7–5
Mixed doubles	(Australia) Owen Davidson (United States) Billie Jean King	(Mexico) Raúl Ramírez (United States) Janet Newberry	6–3, 6–2 (Note: King became the only player to win the 'triple crown' (Singles, Doubles & Mixed Doubles) twice in the post-war era, repeating her success of 1967.)

== US Open ==
Category	Champion(s)	Finalist(s)	Score
Men's singles	(Australia) John Newcombe	(Czechoslovakia) Jan Kodeš	6–4, 1–6, 4–6, 6–2, 6–3 (Note: It was Newcombe's 6th career Grand Slam singles title, his 4th in the Open Era and his 2nd and last title at the US Open.)
Women's singles	(Australia) Margaret Court	(Australia) Evonne Goolagong	7–6, 5–7, 6–2 (Note: It was Court's 24th and last career Grand Slam singles title, her 11th in the Open Era and her 5th title at the US Open.)
Men's doubles	(Australia) Owen Davidson (Australia) John Newcombe	(Australia) Rod Laver (Australia) Ken Rosewall	7–5, 2–6, 7–5, 7–5 (Note: It was Davidson's 2nd and last career Grand Slam doubles title and his 1st and only title at the US Open.) (Note: It was Newcombe's 15th career Grand Slam doubles title, his 9th in the Open Era and his 3rd and last title at the US Open.)
Women's doubles	(Australia) Margaret Court (United Kingdom) Virginia Wade	(United States) Rosemary Casals (United States) Billie Jean King	3–6, 6–3, 7–5
Mixed doubles	(United States) Billie Jean King (Australia) Owen Davidson	(Australia) Margaret Court (United States) Marty Riessen	6–3, 3–6, 7–6
