= 1975 U.S. Clay Court Championships – Women's doubles =

Women's doubles
- 1975 U.S. Clay Court Championships

Final
- Champions: (Uruguay) Fiorella Bonicelli (Colombia) Isabel Fernández
- Runners-up: (France) Gail Chanfreau (United States) Julie Heldman
- Score: 3–6, 7–5, 6–3

Events
Singles	men	women
Doubles	men	women
← 1974 ·	U.S. Clay Court Championships	· 1976 →

Top-seeds and defending champions Gail Chanfreau and Julie Heldman made the final but lost to Fiorella Bonicelli and Isabel Fernández, who won $3,500 for their efforts.

== Seeds ==
A champion seed is indicated in bold text while text in italics indicates the round in which that seed was eliminated.

1. (France) Gail Chanfreau / (United States) Julie Heldman (final)
2. N/A
3. (Uruguay) **Fiorella Bonicelli / (Colombia) Isabel Fernández (champions)**
4. N/A

== Draw ==
=== Key ===
- Q = Qualifier
- WC = Wild card
- LL = Lucky loser
- Alt = Alternate
- SE = Special exempt
- PR = Protected ranking
- ITF = ITF entry
- JE = Junior exempt
- w/o = Walkover
- r = Retired
- d = Defaulted
- SR = Special ranking

=== Finals ===
First round
1	**(France) G Chanfreau** **(United States) J Heldman**	**6**	6	**6**
(West Germany) K Ebbinghaus (West Germany) I Riedel	4	**7**	4
**(United States) J Russell** **(United States) J Stratton**	**6**	**6**
(United States) J Anthony (United States) K May	0	0
**(United States) J Newberry** **(Australia) W Turnbull**	**6**	**6**
(France) N Fuchs (Israel) P Peisachov	1	2
**(United States) L duPont** **(United States) T Holladay**	**7**	**6**
(United Kingdom) G Coles (Netherlands) T Zwaan	6	4
(United States) M Redondo (United States) L Tenney	**6**	4	4
**(South Africa) L Boshoff** **(United States) B Nagelsen**	3	**6**	**6**
(United States) P Hogan (United States) S Walsh	2	3
3	**(Uruguay) F Bonicelli** **(Colombia) I Fernández**	**6**	**6**
**(United States) C Evert** **(United States) J Evert**	**6**	**6**
(Argentina) E Weisenberger (United States) S Mehmedbasich	4	3
**(United Kingdom) L Charles** **(United Kingdom) S Mappin**	4	**6**	**6**
(Australia) D Fromholtz (United States) M Louie	**6**	4	2

Quarterfinals
1	**(France) G Chanfreau** **(United States) J Heldman**	**6**	**6**
(United States) J Russell (United States) J Stratton	1	1
(United States) J Newberry (Australia) W Turnbull	2	3
**(United States) L duPont** **(United States) T Holladay**	**6**	**6**
(South Africa) L Boshoff (United States) B Nagelsen	6	2
3	**(Uruguay) F Bonicelli** **(Colombia) I Fernández**	**7**	**6**
**(United States) C Evert** **(United States) J Evert**	**7**	**6**
(United Kingdom) L Charles (United Kingdom) S Mappin	5	3

Semifinals
1	**(France) G Chanfreau** **(United States) J Heldman**	**6**	**6**
(United States) L duPont (United States) T Holladay	4	3
3	**(Uruguay) F Bonicelli** **(Colombia) I Fernández**	**6**	**6**
(United States) C Evert (United States) J Evert	3	3

Final
1	(France) G Chanfreau (United States) J Heldman	**6**	5	3
3	**(Uruguay) F Bonicelli** **(Colombia) I Fernández**	3	**7**	**6**
