= 1974 U.S. Clay Court Championships – Women's singles =

Women's singles
- 1974 U.S. Clay Court Championships

Final
- Champion: (United States) Chris Evert
- Runner-up: (France) Gail Chanfreau
- Score: 6–0, 6–0

Events
Singles	men	women
Doubles	men	women
← 1973 ·	U.S. Clay Court Championships	· 1975 →

Chris Evert took her third US Clay Court title in succession and $6,000 first-prize money, defeating Gail Chanfreau in the final for the loss of only 15 points.

== Seeds ==
A champion seed is indicated in bold text while text in italics indicates the round in which that seed was eliminated.

1. (United States) **Chris Evert (champion)**
2. (United States) Julie Heldman (quarterfinals)
3. (United States) Jeanne Evert (quarterfinals)
4. (Japan) Kazuko Sawamatsu (first round)
5. (United States) Terry Holladay (third round)
6. (Romania) Virginia Ruzici (quarterfinals)
7. (United States) Donna Ganz (first round)
8. (Australia) Dianne Fromholtz (semifinals)

== Draw ==
=== Key ===
- Q = Qualifier
- WC = Wild card
- LL = Lucky loser
- Alt = Alternate
- SE = Special exempt
- PR = Protected ranking
- ITF = ITF entry
- JE = Junior exempt
- w/o = Walkover
- r = Retired
- d = Defaulted
- SR = Special ranking

=== Finals ===
Quarterfinals
1	**(United States) Chris Evert**	**6**	**6**
6	(Romania) Virginia Ruzici	0	1
**(United States) Carrie Meyer**	**7**	**6**
(Belgium) Michèle Gurdal	5	3
8	**(Australia) Dianne Fromholtz**	**6**	**6**
3	(United States) Jeanne Evert	3	0
**(France) Gail Chanfreau**	**6**	**7**
2	(United States) Julie Heldman	3	5

Semifinals
1	**(United States) Chris Evert**	**6**	**6**
(United States) Carrie Meyer	1	2
8	(Australia) Dianne Fromholtz
**(France) Gail Chanfreau**	w/o

Final
1	**(United States) Chris Evert**	**6**	**6**
(France) Gail Chanfreau	0	0

=== Top half ===
==== Section 1 ====
First round

Second round
1	**(United States) C Evert**	**6**	**6**
(Denmark) H Sparre	0	0
**(United States) R Stark**	4	**7**	**6**
(United Kingdom) S Mappin	**6**	5	0
6	**(Romania) V Ruzici**	**6**	**6**
(United Kingdom) L Beaven	4	2
**(United Kingdom) P Moor**	**6**	**6**
(Australia) J Walker	2	0

Third round
1	**(United States) C Evert**	**6**	**6**
(United States) R Stark	2	2
6	**(Romania) V Ruzici**	**6**	**6**
(United Kingdom) P Moor	3	0

Quarterfinals
1	**(United States) C Evert**	**6**	**6**
6	(Romania) V Ruzici	0	1

==== Section 2 ====
First round
4	(Japan) K Sawamatsu	6	0^{r}
**(United States) P Reese**	**7**	1
**(Israel) P Peisachov**	**6**	**6**
(United States) M Struthers	4	4
**(Italy) A-M Nasuelli**	**6**	**6**
(United States) J Haas	3	3
**(United States) C Meyer**	**6**	**6**
(United Kingdom) C Colman	3	3
7	(United States) D Ganz	1	1
**(Belgium) M Gurdal**	**6**	**6**
**(United States) C Fleming**	**6**	**6**
(Denmark) A-M Sorensen	3	1
(United States) S Eastman	3	2
**(Chinese Taipei) Chang C-l**	**6**	**6**
**(Chile) AM Pinto Bravo**	**6**	**6**
(United States) S Maharaj	2	2

Second round
**(United States) P Reese**	**6**	**6**
(Israel) P Peisachov	2	3
(Italy) A-M Nasuelli	1	2
**(United States) C Meyer**	**6**	**6**
**(Belgium) M Gurdal**	**6**	**7**
(United States) C Fleming	1	5
**(Chinese Taipei) Chang C-l**	**7**	2	**6**
(Chile) AM Pinto Bravo	6	**6**	2

Third round
(United States) P Reese	2	2
**(United States) C Meyer**	**6**	**6**
**(Belgium) M Gurdal**	**6**	**6**
(Chinese Taipei) Chang C-l	3	4

Quarterfinals
**(United States) C Meyer**	**7**	**6**
(Belgium) M Gurdal	5	3

=== Bottom half ===
==== Section 3 ====
First round
(United States) P Hogan	0	4
**(United States) S Stap**	**6**	**6**
(Australia) C Doerner	2	4
**(United Kingdom) J Fayter**	**6**	**6**
(United States) M Christenson	3	1
**(Australia) C O'Neil**	**6**	**6**
(United States) Jill Schwikert	0	4
8	**(Australia) D Fromholtz**	**6**	**6**
(United States) R Tenney	4	1
**(France) N Fuchs**	**6**	**6**
(United States) S Barman	0	1
**(United Kingdom) L Charles**	**6**	**6**
(Argentina) R Giscafré
**(United States) D Gralka**	w/o
(United States) N Ornstein	2	0
3	**(United States) J Evert**	**6**	**6**

Second round
**(United States) S Stap**	**6**	**6**
(United Kingdom) J Fayter	4	0
(Australia) C O'Neil	1	2
8	**(Australia) D Fromholtz**	**6**	**6**
**(France) N Fuchs**	**6**	**6**
(United Kingdom) L Charles	4	0
(United States) D Gralka
3	**(United States) J Evert**	w/o

Third round
(United States) S Stap	4	1
8	**(Australia) D Fromholtz**	**6**	**6**
(France) N Fuchs	4	4
3	**(United States) J Evert**	**6**	**6**

Quarterfinals
8	**(Australia) D Fromholtz**	**6**	**6**
3	(United States) J Evert	3	0

==== Section 4 ====
First round

Second round
**(France) G Chanfreau**	**6**	**6**
(United States) L Tenney	4	3
(United States) S Greer	3	**6**	3
5	**(United States) T Holladay**	**6**	3	**6**
**(United Kingdom) L Blachford**	**6**	**6**
(United States) Susie Miner	1	1
(United States) Joy Schwikert	**7**	0	1
2	**(United States) J Heldman**	5	**6**	**6**

Third round
**(France) G Chanfreau**	**6**	**6**
5	(United States) T Holladay	1	2
(United Kingdom) L Blachford	2	3
2	**(United States) J Heldman**	**6**	**6**

Quarterfinals
**(France) G Chanfreau**	**6**	**7**
2	(United States) J Heldman	3	5
