= 1974 U.S. Clay Court Championships – Men's doubles =

Men's doubles
- 1974 U.S. Clay Court Championships

Final
- Champions: (United States) Jimmy Connors (Romania) Ilie Năstase
- Runners-up: (West Germany) Jürgen Fassbender (West Germany) Hans-Jürgen Pohmann
- Score: 6–7, 6–3, 6–4

Events
Singles	men	women
Doubles	men	women
← 1973 ·	U.S. Clay Court Championships	· 1975 →

Bob Carmichael and Frew McMillan were playing in World TeamTennis competition and couldn't defend their title. Jimmy Connors and Ilie Năstase won the championship and $6,000 first-prize money following victory over Jürgen Fassbender and Hans-Jürgen Pohmann in the final.

== Seeds ==
A champion seed is indicated in bold text while text in italics indicates the round in which that seed was eliminated.

1. (United States) **Jimmy Connors / (Romania) Ilie Năstase (champions)**
2. (West Germany) Jürgen Fassbender / (West Germany) Hans-Jürgen Pohmann (final)
3. (Spain) Manuel Orantes / (Argentina) Guillermo Vilas (semifinals)
4. (Australia) Dick Crealy / (New Zealand) Onny Parun (quarterfinals)
5. (United States) Brian Gottfried / (Mexico) Raúl Ramírez (quarterfinals)
6. (United States) Dick Dell / (United States) Sherwood Stewart (quarterfinals)
7. (United States) Bob Lutz / (United States) Erik van Dillen (quarterfinals)
8. (Sweden) Björn Borg / (Spain) Juan Gisbert (semifinals)

== Draw ==
=== Key ===
- Q = Qualifier
- WC = Wild card
- LL = Lucky loser
- Alt = Alternate
- SE = Special exempt
- PR = Protected ranking
- ITF = ITF entry
- JE = Junior exempt
- w/o = Walkover
- r = Retired
- d = Defaulted
- SR = Special ranking

=== Finals ===
Semifinals
1	**(United States) Jimmy Connors** **(Romania) Ilie Năstase**	**7**	**7**
3	(Spain) Manuel Orantes (Argentina) Guillermo Vilas	5	5
8	(Sweden) Björn Borg (Spain) Juan Gisbert
2	**(West Germany) Jürgen Fassbender** **(West Germany) Hans-Jürgen Pohmann**	w/o

Final
1	**(United States) Jimmy Connors** **(Romania) Ilie Năstase**	6	**6**	**6**
2	(West Germany) Jürgen Fassbender (West Germany) Hans-Jürgen Pohmann	**7**	3	4

=== Top half ===
First round
1	**(United States) J Connors** **(Romania) I Năstase**	**6**	**6**
(United States) P DuPré (United States) P Fleming	0	4
(Pakistan) H Rahim (Netherlands) R Thung	5	4
**(Australia) S Ball** **(Australia) R Keldie**	**7**	**6**
6	**(United States) D Dell** **(United States) S Stewart**	w/o
(United States) R Barth (South Africa) R Seegers
(United States) S Faulk (United States) W Higgins	**6**	4	3
**(United States) W Brown** **(United States) C DeVoe**	4	**6**	**6**
3	**(Spain) M Orantes** **(Argentina) G Vilas**	**6**	**6**
(Mexico) J Loyo Mayo (Chile) J Pinto-Bravo	1	3
(United States) M Cahill (United States) F McNair	3	2
**(United States) V Amaya** **(United States) G Hardie**	**6**	**6**
7	**(United States) B Lutz** **(United States) E van Dillen**	**6**	**6**
(Pakistan) S Meer (Peru) F Ponte	3	1
**(Japan) J Kamiwazumi** **(New Zealand) J Simpson**	**6**	**6**
(United States) B Martin (New Zealand) T Parun	2	4

Second round
1	**(United States) J Connors** **(Romania) I Năstase**	**6**	**7**
(Australia) S Ball (Australia) R Keldie	4	6
6	**(United States) D Dell** **(United States) S Stewart**	**6**	**6**
(United States) W Brown (United States) C DeVoe	0	4
3	**(Spain) M Orantes** **(Argentina) G Vilas**	**6**	**6**
(United States) V Amaya (United States) G Hardie	4	4
7	**(United States) B Lutz** **(United States) E van Dillen**	**6**	**6**
(Japan) J Kamiwazumi (New Zealand) J Simpson	1	4

Quarterfinals
1	**(United States) J Connors** **(Romania) I Năstase**	**6**	**7**
6	(United States) D Dell (United States) S Stewart	1	6
3	**(Spain) M Orantes** **(Argentina) G Vilas**	**6**	**7**
7	(United States) B Lutz (United States) E van Dillen	4	5

Semifinals
1	**(United States) J Connors** **(Romania) I Năstase**	**7**	**7**
3	(Spain) M Orantes (Argentina) G Vilas	5	5

=== Bottom half ===
First round
(United States) N Holmes (Japan) J Kuki	5	1
**(United States) J Delaney** **(United States) J Whitlinger**	**7**	**6**
(United States) J Fort (United States) K McMillan	3	4
8	**(Sweden) B Borg** **(Spain) J Gisbert Sr.**	**6**	**6**
(Rhodesia) R Dowdeswell (India) P Lall	4	4
**(United States) R Kreiss** **(Australia) P Kronk**	**6**	**6**
(Venezuela) H Hose (Chile) B Prajoux	**6**	3	4
4	**(Australia) D Crealy** **(New Zealand) O Parun**	2	**6**	**6**
(United States) Greg Brents (United States) Mike Smart	**6**	1	2
**(France) J-F Caujolle** **(Socialist Federal Republic of Yugoslavia) N Špear**	3	**6**	**6**
(United States) Steve Briggs (United States) R Evett	2	3
5	**(United States) B Gottfried** **(Mexico) R Ramírez**	**6**	**6**
(United States) N Saviano (United States) T Waltke	1	2
**(Czechoslovakia) M Holeček** **(West Germany) K Meiler**	**6**	**6**
(Mexico) M Lara (Spain) A Muñoz	1	2
2	**(West Germany) J Fassbender** **(West Germany) H-J Pohmann**	**6**	**6**

Second round
(United States) J Delaney (United States) J Whitlinger	2	**7**	3
8	**(Sweden) B Borg** **(Spain) J Gisbert Sr.**	**6**	6	**6**
(United States) R Kreiss (Australia) P Kronk	3	3
4	**(Australia) D Crealy** **(New Zealand) O Parun**	**6**	**6**
(France) J-F Caujolle (Socialist Federal Republic of Yugoslavia) N Špear	3	3
5	**(United States) B Gottfried** **(Mexico) R Ramírez**	**6**	**6**
(Czechoslovakia) M Holeček (West Germany) K Meiler	**7**	4	2
2	**(West Germany) J Fassbender** **(West Germany) H-J Pohmann**	6	**6**	**6**

Quarterfinals
8	**(Sweden) B Borg** **(Spain) J Gisbert Sr.**	**6**	6	**7**
4	(Australia) D Crealy (New Zealand) O Parun	4	**7**	5
5	(United States) B Gottfried (Mexico) R Ramírez	1	2
2	**(West Germany) J Fassbender** **(West Germany) H-J Pohmann**	**6**	**6**

Semifinals
8	(Sweden) B Borg (Spain) J Gisbert Sr.
2	**(West Germany) J Fassbender** **(West Germany) H-J Pohmann**	w/o
