= 1974 U.S. Clay Court Championships – Men's singles =

Men's singles
- 1974 U.S. Clay Court Championships

Final
- Champion: (United States) Jimmy Connors
- Runner-up: (Sweden) Björn Borg
- Score: 5–7, 6–3, 6–4

Details
- Draw: 64
- Seeds: 12

Events
Singles	men	women
Doubles	men	women
- U.S. Clay Court Championships

The 1974 U.S. Clay Court Championships – Men's singles was an event of the 1974 U.S. Clay Court Championships tennis tournament and was played on outdoor clay courts in Indianapolis, Indiana in the United States from August 5 through August 12, 1974. The draw comprised 64 players and 12 of them were seeded. Fourth-seeded Manuel Orantes was the defending champion U.S. Clay Court Championships singles champion but lost in the semifinals to Jimmy Connors. First-seeded Jimmy Connors won the title and $16,000 first-prize money by defeating third-seeded Björn Borg in the final, 5–7, 6–3, 6–4. It was their first encounter on clay courts.

== Seeds ==
A champion seed is indicated in bold text while text in italics indicates the round in which that seed was eliminated.

1. (United States) **Jimmy Connors (champion)**
2. (Romania) Ilie Năstase (quarterfinals)
3. (Sweden) Björn Borg (final)
4. (Spain) Manuel Orantes (semifinals)
5. (Mexico) Raúl Ramírez (semifinals)
6. (Argentina) Guillermo Vilas (quarterfinals)
7. (United States) Brian Gottfried (quarterfinals)
8. (New Zealand) Onny Parun (quarterfinals)
9. (West Germany) Jürgen Fassbender (second round)
10. (West Germany) Hans-Jürgen Pohmann (third round)
11. (West Germany) Karl Meiler (second round)
12. (Spain) Juan Gisbert (third round)

== Draw ==
Key

- Q = Qualifier
- WC = Wild card
- LL = Lucky loser
- Alt = Alternate
- ITF = ITF entry
- PR = Protected ranking
- SR = Special ranking
- SE = Special exempt
- JE = Junior exempt
- JR = Junior Accelerator Programme entrant
- CO = College Accelerator Programme entrant
- NG = Next Gen Accelerator Program entrant
- w/o = Walkover
- r = Retired
- d = Defaulted

=== Finals ===
Quarterfinals
1	**(United States) Jimmy Connors**	**6**	**6**
8	(New Zealand) Onny Parun	3	2
4	**(Spain) Manuel Orantes**	**6**	**6**
6	(Argentina) Guillermo Vilas	1	3
7	(United States) Brian Gottfried	4	**6**	2
3	**(Sweden) Björn Borg**	**6**	3	**6**
5	**(Mexico) Raúl Ramírez**	**7**	5
2	(Romania) Ilie Năstase	5	5^{d}

Semifinals
1	**(United States) Jimmy Connors**	**6**	**6**
4	(Spain) Manuel Orantes	4	3
3	**(Sweden) Björn Borg**	**7**	6	**6**
5	(Mexico) Raúl Ramírez	5	**7**	4

Final
1	**(United States) Jimmy Connors**	5	**6**	**6**
3	(Sweden) Björn Borg	**7**	3	4

=== Top half ===
==== Section 1 ====
First round
1	**(United States) J Connors**	**6**	**6**
(United States) P DuPré	4	4
**(Rhodesia) R Dowdeswell**	**6**	**6**
(United States) S Faulk	4	1
10	**(West Germany) H-J Pohmann**	6	**6**	**6**
(Japan) J Kuki	**7**	3	0
(Socialist Federal Republic of Yugoslavia) N Špear	2	**6**	1
**(Australia) R Keldie**	**6**	2	**6**
8	**(New Zealand) O Parun**	**6**	**6**
(Czechoslovakia) F Pála	3	2
(Australia) K Hancock	4	**6**	6
**(India) J Singh**	**6**	3	**7**
(Australia) S Ball	**6**	3	4
**(United States) M Cahill**	1	**6**	**6**
(United States) G Hardie	6	4
**(United States) W Brown**	**7**	**6**

Second round
1	**(United States) J Connors**	**6**	**6**
(Rhodesia) R Dowdeswell	1	2
10	**(West Germany) H-J Pohmann**	**6**	6	**6**
(Australia) R Keldie	3	**7**	2
8	**(New Zealand) O Parun**	**6**	**6**
(India) J Singh	4	3
**(United States) M Cahill**	**6**	**7**
(United States) W Brown	2	6

Third round
1	**(United States) J Connors**	**6**	**6**
10	(West Germany) H-J Pohmann	2	1
8	**(New Zealand) O Parun**	**6**	**7**
(United States) M Cahill	3	5

Quarterfinals
1	**(United States) J Connors**	**6**	**6**
8	(New Zealand) O Parun	3	2

==== Section 2 ====
First round
4	**(Spain) M Orantes**	**6**	**6**
(Venezuela) H Hose	2	0
(West Germany) H-J Plötz	5	5
**(Spain) A Muñoz**	**7**	**7**
**(Austria) H Kary**	3	**6**	**6**
(United States) J McManus	**6**	3	1
**(United States) B Lutz**	**6**	**6**
(United States) N Saviano	3	2
6	**(Argentina) G Vilas**	**6**	**6**
(South Africa) R Seegers	4	3
**(Mexico) J Loyo Mayo**	**6**	**6**
(Peru) F Ponte	4	4
(Italy) A Zugarelli	**6**	5	3
**(Czechoslovakia) M Holeček**	0	**7**	**6**
(United States) D Dell	**6**	4	6
**(Australia) P Kronk**	2	**6**	**7**

Second round
4	**(Spain) M Orantes**	**6**	**6**
(Spain) A Muñoz	4	4
(Austria) H Kary	1^{r}
**(United States) B Lutz**	1
6	**(Argentina) G Vilas**	**6**	2	**6**
(Mexico) J Loyo Mayo	3	**6**	0
(Czechoslovakia) M Holeček	2	4
**(Australia) P Kronk**	**6**	**6**

Third round
4	**(Spain) M Orantes**	**7**	**6**
(United States) B Lutz	5	2
6	**(Argentina) G Vilas**	**6**	**6**
(Australia) P Kronk	2	2

Quarterfinals
4	**(Spain) M Orantes**	**6**	**6**
6	(Argentina) G Vilas	1	3

=== Bottom half ===
==== Section 3 ====
First round
**(United States) E van Dillen**	**7**	**6**
(Netherlands) R Thung	6	2
(Chile) B Prajoux	3	4
11	**(West Germany) K Meiler**	**6**	**6**
(United States) R Evett	4	4
**(United States) B Teacher**	**6**	**6**
(Japan) J Kamiwazumi	1	5
7	**(United States) B Gottfried**	**6**	**7**
(United States) J Whitlinger	**6**	2	1
**(France) J-F Caujolle**	2	**6**	**6**
(United States) C Hagey	1	0
12	**(Spain) J Gisbert**	**6**	**6**
**(United States) T Waltke**	6	**6**	**6**
(United States) K McMillan	**7**	2	3
(United States) N Holmes	1	3
3	**(Sweden) B Borg**	**6**	**6**

Second round
**(United States) E van Dillen**	**6**	**6**
11	(West Germany) K Meiler	3	3
(United States) B Teacher	2	1
7	**(United States) B Gottfried**	**6**	**6**
(France) J-F Caujolle	2	1
12	**(Spain) J Gisbert**	**6**	**6**
(United States) T Waltke	0	5
3	**(Sweden) B Borg**	**6**	**7**

Third round
(United States) E van Dillen	3	2
7	**(United States) B Gottfried**	**6**	**6**
12	(Spain) J Gisbert	4	3
3	**(Sweden) B Borg**	**6**	**6**

Quarterfinals
7	(United States) B Gottfried	4	**6**	2
3	**(Sweden) B Borg**	**6**	3	**6**

==== Section 4 ====
First round
(Pakistan) H Rahim	4	3
**(United States) V Amaya**	**6**	**6**
(United States) J Delaney	4	4
9	**(West Germany) J Fassbender**	**6**	**6**
**(United States) W Higgins**	4	**7**	**6**
(India) P Lall	**6**	6	4
(United States) S Stewart	2	**6**	4
5	**(Mexico) R Ramírez**	**6**	3	**6**
(United States) R Barth	1	2
**(Chile) J Pinto-Bravo**	**6**	**6**
(United States) R Kreiss	2	1
**(Australia) D Crealy**	**6**	**6**
**(United States) F McNair**	5	**6**	**6**
(New Zealand) J Simpson	**7**	1	3
(Mexico) M Lara	3	**7**	3
2	**(Romania) I Năstase**	**6**	6	**6**

Second round
**(United States) V Amaya**	5	**6**	**6**
9	(West Germany) J Fassbender	**7**	4	3
(United States) W Higgins	3	0
5	**(Mexico) R Ramírez**	**6**	**6**
(Chile) J Pinto-Bravo	4	3
**(Australia) D Crealy**	**6**	**6**
(United States) F McNair	2	3
2	**(Romania) I Năstase**	**6**	**6**

Third round
(United States) V Amaya	6	**6**	6
5	**(Mexico) R Ramírez**	**7**	3	**7**
(Australia) D Crealy	0	4
2	**(Romania) I Năstase**	**6**	**6**

Quarterfinals
5	**(Mexico) R Ramírez**	**7**	5
2	(Romania) I Năstase	5	5^{d}

== See also ==
- Borg–Connors rivalry
