= 1975 U.S. Clay Court Championships – Women's singles =

Women's singles
- 1975 U.S. Clay Court Championships

Final
- Champion: (United States) Chris Evert
- Runner-up: (Australia) Dianne Fromholtz
- Score: 6–3, 6–4

Events
| Singles | men | women |
| Doubles | men | women |
| ← 1974 · | U.S. Clay Court Championships | · 1976 → |

Chris Evert took her fourth consecutive US Clay Court title and $10,000 first-prize money, defeating Dianne Fromholtz in the final.

== Seeds ==
A champion seed is indicated in bold text while text in italics indicates the round in which that seed was eliminated.

1. (United States) **Chris Evert (champion)**
2. (United States) Julie Heldman (quarterfinals)
3. (United States) Marcie Louie (third round)
4. (United States) Nancy Gunter (semifinals)
5. (United States) Janet Newberry (second round)
  (Argentina) ~~Raquel Giscafré~~ (withdrew)
6. (United States) Terry Holladay (third round)
7. (France) Gail Chanfreau (second round)
8. (South Africa) Linky Boshoff (second round)

== Draw ==
=== Key ===
- Q = Qualifier
- WC = Wild card
- LL = Lucky loser
- Alt = Alternate
- SE = Special exempt
- PR = Protected ranking
- ITF = ITF entry
- JE = Junior exempt
- w/o = Walkover
- r = Retired
- d = Defaulted
- SR = Special ranking

=== Finals ===
Quarterfinals
1 | **(United States) Chris Evert** | **6** | **6**
(United States) Donna Ganz | 1 | 2
4 | **(United States) Nancy Gunter** | **6** | **7**
5 | (United States) Janet Newberry | 4 | 5
(West Germany) Iris Riedel | 4 | 1
**(Australia) Dianne Fromholtz** | **6** | **6**
**(West Germany) Katja Ebbinghaus** | **7** | **6**
2 | (United States) Julie Heldman | 5 | 4

Semifinals
1 | **(United States) Chris Evert** | 6 | **7** | 4
4 | (United States) Nancy Gunter | **7** | 5 | 2^{r}
**(Australia) Dianne Fromholtz** | 6 | **6** | **6**
(West Germany) Katja Ebbinghaus | **7** | 0 | 2

Final
1 | **(United States) Chris Evert** | **6** | **6**
(Australia) Dianne Fromholtz | 3 | 4

=== Top half ===
==== Section 1 ====
First round
(United States) S Walsh | 6 | 4
**(Israel) P Peisachov** | **7** | **6**
**(United Kingdom) G Coles** | **6** | **6**
(United States) C Martinez | 3 | 3
6 | **(United States) T Holladay** | 5 | **6** | **6**
(United States) S Mehmedbasich | **7** | 2 | 1
(Australia) W Paish | 4 | 4
**(United States) D Ganz** | **6** | **6**

Second round
1 | **(United States) C Evert** | **6** | **6**
(Israel) P Peisachov | 0 | 2
Q | (Argentina) E Weisenberger | 3 | 4
**(United Kingdom) G Coles** | **6** | **6**
Q | (United States) C Reynolds | 0 | 2
6 | **(United States) T Holladay** | **6** | **6**
(United Kingdom) S Mappin | 4 | 4
**(United States) D Ganz** | **6** | **6**

Third round
1 | **(United States) C Evert** | **6** | **6**
(United Kingdom) G Coles | 2 | 0
6 | (United States) T Holladay | 3 | 3
**(United States) D Ganz** | **6** | **6**

Quarterfinals
1 | **(United States) C Evert** | **6** | **6**
(United States) D Ganz | 1 | 2

==== Section 2 ====
First round
4 | **(United States) N Gunter** | 3 | **6** | **7**
Q | (United States) L Rowley | **6** | 1 | 6
(United States) M Redondo | 4 | 1
**(United States) L duPont** | **6** | **6**
5 | **(United States) J Newberry** | **6** | **6**
(Australia) J Dimond | 1 | 1
(Brazil) M Bueno | 3 | 5
Q | **(Romania) M Simionescu** | **6** | **7**

Second round
4 | **(United States) N Gunter** | **6** | 6 | **6**
(United States) J Russell | 2 | **7** | 1
**(United States) L duPont** | **6** | **6**
Q | (United States) M McLean | 1 | 1
5 | **(United States) J Newberry** | **6** | **6**
(United States) B Bruning | 2 | 2
Q | **(Romania) M Simionescu** | **6** | **6**
(Netherlands) T Zwaan | 1 | 1

Third round
4 | **(United States) N Gunter** | **6** | **7**
(United States) L duPont | 1 | 5
5 | **(United States) J Newberry** | **7** | **6**
Q | (Romania) M Simionescu | 6 | 3

Quarterfinals
4 | **(United States) N Gunter** | **6** | **7**
5 | (United States) J Newberry | 4 | 5

=== Bottom half ===
==== Section 3 ====
First round
**(Colombia) I Fernández** | **6** | **6**
(United States) P Hogan | 2 | 3
(United States) R Tenney | 1 | 2
7 | **(France) G Chanfreau** | **6** | **6**
Q | **(United States) M Struthers** | **7** | **6**
(United States) P Teeguarden | 6 | 3
(United States) K May | 6 | 2
3 | **(United States) M Louie** | **7** | **6**

Second round
Q | **(United States) M O'Keefe** | 1 | **6** | **7**
(Colombia) I Fernández | **6** | 1 | 5
**(West Germany) I Riedel** | **7** | **7**
7 | (France) G Chanfreau | 6 | 5
**(Australia) D Fromholtz** | **7** | **6**
Q | (United States) M Struthers | 6 | 4
(Italy) A-M Nasuelli | 6 | 1^{r}
3 | **(United States) M Louie** | **7** | 4

Third round
Q | (United States) M O'Keefe | 1 | 3
**(West Germany) I Riedel** | **6** | **6**
**(Australia) D Fromholtz** | **6** | **6**
3 | (United States) M Louie | 3 | 2

Quarterfinals
(West Germany) I Riedel | 4 | 1
**(Australia) D Fromholtz** | **6** | **6**

==== Section 4 ====
First round
(Australia) C Doerner | 3 | 4
**(West Germany) K Ebbinghaus** | **6** | **6**
(France) N Fuchs | 4 | 4
Q | **(United States) S Moore** | **6** | **6**
**(United States) J Anthony** | 3 | **6** | **6**
(Uruguay) F Bonicelli | **6** | 1 | 4
(Belgium) M Gurdal | 1 | 0
2 | **(United States) J Heldman** | **6** | **6**

Second round
(United States) J Evert | 1 | 1
**(West Germany) K Ebbinghaus** | **6** | **6**
8 | (South Africa) L Boshoff | 4 | 2
Q | **(United States) S Moore** | **6** | **6**
(United States) B Nagelsen | 0 | 4
**(United States) J Anthony** | **6** | **6**
(United Kingdom) L Charles | 2 | 6
2 | **(United States) J Heldman** | **6** | **7**

Third round
**(West Germany) K Ebbinghaus** | **6** | **6**
Q | (United States) S Moore | 2 | 1
(United States) J Anthony | 3 | **6** | 5
2 | **(United States) J Heldman** | **6** | 2 | **7**

Quarterfinals
**(West Germany) K Ebbinghaus** | **7** | **6**
2 | (United States) J Heldman | 5 | 4
