= 1973 US Open – Women's doubles =

Women's doubles
- 1973 US Open

Final
- Champion: (Australia) Margaret Court (United Kingdom) Virginia Wade
- Runner-up: (United States) Rosemary Casals (United States) Billie Jean King
- Score: 3–6, 6–3, 7–5

Details
- Draw: 32
- Seeds: 4

Events
Singles	men	women		boys	girls
Doubles	men	women	mixed	boys	girls
WC Singles	men	women	quad
WC Doubles	men	women	quad
Legends	men	women	mixed
← 1972 ·	US Open	· 1974 →

Françoise Dürr and Betty Stöve were the defending champions but lost in the quarterfinals to Chris Evert and Olga Morozova.

Margaret Court and Virginia Wade won the title by defeating Rosemary Casals and Billie Jean King 3–6, 6–3, 7–5 in the final.

== Seeds ==
1. (United States) Rosie Casals / (United States) Billie Jean King (final)
2. (Australia) Margaret Court / (United Kingdom) Virginia Wade (champions)
3. (France) Françoise Dürr / (Netherlands) Betty Stöve (quarterfinals)
4. (Australia) Evonne Goolagong / (Australia) Janet Young (semifinals)

== Draw ==
=== Key ===
- Q = Qualifier
- WC = Wild card
- LL = Lucky loser
- Alt = Alternate
- SE = Special exempt
- PR = Protected ranking
- ITF = ITF entry
- JE = Junior exempt
- w/o = Walkover
- r = Retired
- d = Defaulted
- SR = Special ranking

=== Finals ===
Semifinals
2	(Australia) Margaret Court (United Kingdom) Virginia Wade	6	6
4	(Australia) Evonne Goolagong (Australia) Janet Young	0	4
(United States) Chris Evert (Soviet Union) Olga Morozova	2	1
1	(United States) Rosie Casals (United States) Billie Jean King	6	6

Final
2	(Australia) Margaret Court (United Kingdom) Virginia Wade	3	6	7
1	(United States) Rosie Casals (United States) Billie Jean King	6	3	5

=== Top half ===
First round
2	(Australia) M Court (United Kingdom) V Wade	6	6
(United States) J Metcalf (United States) J Stratton	1	0
(Australia) C Doerner (Rhodesia) D Pattison	3	4
(Australia) L Bowrey (United States) C Graebner	6	6
(Australia) K Harris (Australia) K Melville	6	7
(United States) J Evert (United States) J Haas	2	5
(United States) J Russell (United States) L Tenney	2	3
(Australia) H Gourlay (South Africa) B Kirk	6	6
4	(Australia) E Goolagong (Australia) J Young	6	6
(Soviet Union) E Birioukova (Soviet Union) M Kroschina	3	2
(United States) A Kiyomura (United States) M Redondo	7	6
(Uruguay) F Bonicelli (Colombia) I Fernández de Soto	6	3
(Australia) K Krantzcke (United States) W Overton	7	7
(United States) P Hogan (United States) S Walsh	5	6
(United States) TA Fretz (United States) J Heldman	6	6
(United States) L duPont (United States) K Kemmer	4	4

Second round
2	(Australia) M Court (United Kingdom) V Wade	6	6
(Australia) L Bowrey (United States) C Graebner	1	3
(Australia) K Harris (Australia) K Melville	6	6
(Australia) H Gourlay (South Africa) B Kirk	2	2
4	(Australia) E Goolagong (Australia) J Young	6	2	6
(United States) A Kiyomura (United States) M Redondo	0	6	0
(Australia) K Krantzcke (United States) W Overton	6	6
(United States) TA Fretz (United States) J Heldman	4	2

Quarterfinals
2	(Australia) M Court (United Kingdom) V Wade	7	6
(Australia) K Harris (Australia) K Melville	6	3
4	(Australia) E Goolagong (Australia) J Young	3	6	7
(Australia) K Krantzcke (United States) W Overton	6	4	5

Semifinals
2	(Australia) M Court (United Kingdom) V Wade	6	6
4	(Australia) E Goolagong (Australia) J Young	0	4

=== Bottom half ===
First round
(United States) J Newberry (United States) P Teeguarden	6	7
(United States) S Greer (United States) L Rupert	1	5
(United States) K Kuykendall (South Africa) L Rossouw	3	2
(United States) C Evert (Soviet Union) O Morozova	6	6
(United States) A Gibson (United States) D Hard	6	5	1
(Japan) K Fukuoka (Japan) K Sawamatsu	4	7	6
(United States) M Harper (United States) J Schwikert	1	5
3	(France) F Dürr (Netherlands) B Stöve	6	7
(United States) J Anthony (United States) M Schallau	6	6
(United Kingdom) J Fayter (Argentina) R Giscafré	1	1
(United States) C Fleming (United States) L Fleming	3	6
(United States) P Michel (United States) V Ziegenfuss	6	7
(United Kingdom) L Charles (United Kingdom) G Coles	5	2
(South Africa) I Kloss (South Africa) P Pretorius	7	6
(Australia) L Hunt (Czechoslovakia) M Navratilova	5	0
1	(United States) R Casals (United States) BJ King	7	6

Second round
(United States) J Newberry (United States) P Teeguarden	4	2
(United States) C Evert (Soviet Union) O Morozova	6	6
(Japan) K Fukuoka (Japan) K Sawamatsu	3	3
3	(France) F Dürr (Netherlands) B Stöve	6	6
(United States) J Anthony (United States) M Schallau	6	7
(United States) P Michel (United States) V Ziegenfuss	2	6
(South Africa) I Kloss (South Africa) P Pretorius	1	6	0
1	(United States) R Casals (United States) BJ King	6	2	6

Quarterfinals
(United States) C Evert (Soviet Union) O Morozova	7	5	6
3	(France) F Dürr (Netherlands) B Stöve	5	7	1
(United States) J Anthony (United States) M Schallau	7	6	1
1	(United States) R Casals (United States) BJ King	6	7	6

Semifinals
(United States) C Evert (Soviet Union) O Morozova	2	1
1	(United States) R Casals (United States) BJ King	6	6
