= 1975 U.S. Clay Court Championships – Men's singles =

Men's singles
- 1975 U.S. Clay Court Championships

Final
- Champion: (Spain) Manuel Orantes
- Runner-up: (United States) Arthur Ashe
- Score: 6–2, 6–2

Details
- Draw: 64
- Seeds: 16

Events
Singles	men	women
Doubles	men	women
- U.S. Clay Court Championships

Jimmy Connors did not defend his title, he chose to play in North Conway instead. Third-seeded Manuel Orantes won the championship for the second time and $16,000 first-prize money by defeating Arthur Ashe in the final.

== Seeds ==
A champion seed is indicated in bold text while text in italics indicates the round in which that seed was eliminated.

1. (Argentina) Guillermo Vilas (semifinals)
2. (United States) Arthur Ashe (final)
3. (Spain) **Manuel Orantes (champion)**
4. (Mexico) Raúl Ramírez (second round)
5. (New Zealand) Onny Parun (semifinals)
6. (United States) Cliff Richey (first round)
7. (United States) Brian Gottfried (first round)
8. (Chile) Jaime Fillol (quarterfinals)
9. (United States) Eddie Dibbs (quarterfinals)
10. (Italy) Adriano Panatta (third round)
11. (Spain) Juan Gisbert (quarterfinals)
12. (United States) Billy Martin (first round)
13. (South Africa) Cliff Drysdale (second round)
14. (Brazil) Thomaz Koch (third round)
15. (Italy) Paolo Bertolucci (second round)
16. (Spain) José Higueras (second round)

== Draw ==
Key

- Q = Qualifier
- WC = Wild card
- LL = Lucky loser
- Alt = Alternate
- ITF = ITF entry
- PR = Protected ranking
- SR = Special ranking
- SE = Special exempt
- JE = Junior exempt
- JR = Junior Accelerator Programme entrant
- CO = College Accelerator Programme entrant
- NG = Next Gen Accelerator Program entrant
- w/o = Walkover
- r = Retired
- d = Defaulted

=== Finals ===
Quarterfinals
1	**(Argentina) Guillermo Vilas**	**6**	**6**
9	(United States) Eddie Dibbs	4	1
3	**(Spain) Manuel Orantes**	**6**	**6**
11	(Spain) Juan Gisbert	2	2
5	**(New Zealand) Onny Parun**	4	**6**	**6**
(Colombia) Iván Molina	**6**	1	4
8	(Chile) Jaime Fillol	6	3
2	**(United States) Arthur Ashe**	**7**	**6**

Semifinals
1	(Argentina) Guillermo Vilas	4	2
3	**(Spain) Manuel Orantes**	**6**	**6**
5	(New Zealand) Onny Parun	4	6
2	**(United States) Arthur Ashe**	**6**	**7**

Final
3	**(Spain) Manuel Orantes**	**6**	**6**
2	(United States) Arthur Ashe	2	2

=== Top half ===
==== Section 1 ====
First round
1	**(Argentina) G Vilas**	**6**	**6**
(United States) J Whitlinger	3	2
(United States) K McMillan	4	3
**(Chile) P Cornejo**	**6**	**6**
16	**(Spain) J Higueras**	**6**	**6**
(United States) S Turner	3	1
**(Socialist Federal Republic of Yugoslavia) Ž Franulović**	**6**	3	**6**
(United States) V Amaya	4	**6**	3
6	(United States) C Richey	3	4
**(United States) B Teacher**	**6**	**6**
**(United States) S Krulevitz**	**6**	3	**6**
(United States) G Mayer	4	**6**	3
9	**(United States) E Dibbs**	4	**6**	**6**
(West Germany) U Pinner	**6**	1	0
**(India) S Menon**	**6**	3	**7**
(United States) M Cahill	4	**6**	6

Second round
1	**(Argentina) G Vilas**	**6**	**6**
(Chile) P Cornejo	3	3
16	(Spain) J Higueras	**6**	3	4
**(Socialist Federal Republic of Yugoslavia) Ž Franulović**	3	**6**	**6**
**(United States) B Teacher**	**6**	**6**
(United States) S Krulevitz	1	2
9	**(United States) E Dibbs**	**6**	**6**
(India) S Menon	2	4

Third round
1	**(Argentina) G Vilas**	**6**	**6**
(Socialist Federal Republic of Yugoslavia) Ž Franulović	2	3
(United States) B Teacher	**6**	2	4
9	**(United States) E Dibbs**	4	**6**	**6**

Quarterfinals
1	**(Argentina) G Vilas**	**6**	**6**
9	(United States) E Dibbs	4	1

==== Section 2 ====
First round
3	**(Spain) M Orantes**	**6**	**6**
(France) J-F Caujolle	1	2
**(United States) D Dell**	**7**	**6**
(Brazil) LF Tavares	5	1
13	**(South Africa) C Drysdale**	**6**	**7**
(United States) M Estep	1	6
(Bolivia) R Benavides	2	3
**(Australia) B Carmichael**	**6**	**6**
7	(United States) B Gottfried	3	**6**	3
**(Poland) W Fibak**	**6**	1	**6**
**(Colombia) J Velasco**	6	**6**	**6**
(Australia) S Ball	**7**	4	1
11	**(Spain) J Gisbert**	**6**	**6**
(Australia) P Kronk	4	4
**(France) D Naegelen**	**6**	**6**
(United States) N Saviano	3	4

Second round
3	**(Spain) M Orantes**	**6**	**6**
(United States) D Dell	1	2
13	(South Africa) C Drysdale	5	3
**(Australia) B Carmichael**	**7**	**6**
(Poland) W Fibak	**6**	1	4
**(Colombia) J Velasco**	4	**6**	**6**
11	**(Spain) J Gisbert**	**6**	2	**6**
(France) D Naegelen	3	**6**	2

Third round
3	**(Spain) M Orantes**	**6**	**6**
(Australia) B Carmichael	2	2
(Colombia) J Velasco	4	**6**	2
11	**(Spain) J Gisbert**	**6**	2	**6**

Quarterfinals
3	**(Spain) M Orantes**	**6**	**6**
11	(Spain) J Gisbert	2	2

=== Bottom half ===
==== Section 3 ====
First round
**(Chile) B Prajoux**	**6**	**6**
(South Africa) B Mitton	3	1
(South Africa) B Bertram	3	3
10	**(Italy) A Panatta**	**6**	**6**
(Paraguay) F González	3	6
**(United States) S Stewart**	**6**	**7**
(Spain) A Muñoz	4	**7**	2
5	**(New Zealand) O Parun**	**6**	5	**6**
**(Colombia) I Molina**	**6**	**6**
(Belgium) B Mignot	4	2
(United States) T Waltke	**6**	4	2
15	**(Italy) P Bertolucci**	2	**6**	**6**
(United States) W Brown	2	2
**(Argentina) R Cano**	**6**	**6**
(Australia) A Gardiner	**6**	5	2
4	**(Mexico) R Ramírez**	4	**7**	**6**

Second round
(Chile) B Prajoux	4	4
10	**(Italy) A Panatta**	**6**	**6**
(United States) S Stewart	4	5
5	**(New Zealand) O Parun**	**6**	**7**
**(Colombia) I Molina**	**6**	**6**
15	(Italy) P Bertolucci	3	1
**(Argentina) R Cano**	**6**	**7**
4	(Mexico) R Ramírez	3	6

Third round
10	(Italy) A Panatta	4	3
5	**(New Zealand) O Parun**	**6**	**6**
**(Colombia) I Molina**	**6**	2	**6**
(Argentina) R Cano	3	**6**	2

Quarterfinals
5	**(New Zealand) O Parun**	4	**6**	**6**
(Colombia) I Molina	**6**	1	4

==== Section 4 ====
First round
**(West Germany) H Elschenbroich**	**6**	**6**
(West Germany) H-J Pohmann	2	4
**(Austria) H Kary**	**6**	**6**
12	(United States) B Martin	4	1
**(United States) F McNair**	**6**	0	**6**
(France) J-L Haillet	3	**6**	1
(United States) J Delaney	3	2
8	**(Chile) J Fillol**	**6**	**6**
**(United States) P Fleming**	**6**	**6**
(Japan) J Kuki	4	3
(United States) H Bunis	**6**	5	1
14	**(Brazil) T Koch**	4	**7**	**6**
**(Mexico) J Loyo Mayo**	**6**	3	**6**
(Japan) J Kamiwazumi	2	**6**	1
(Mexico) M Lara	1	1
2	**(United States) A Ashe**	**6**	**6**

Second round
(West Germany) H Elschenbroich	3	2
**(Austria) H Kary**	**6**	**6**
(United States) F McNair	3	2
8	**(Chile) J Fillol**	**6**	**6**
(United States) P Fleming	4	5
14	**(Brazil) T Koch**	**6**	**7**
(Mexico) J Loyo Mayo	1	1
2	**(United States) A Ashe**	**6**	**6**

Third round
(Austria) H Kary	3	4
8	**(Chile) J Fillol**	**6**	**6**
14	(Brazil) T Koch	**6**	4	2
2	**(United States) A Ashe**	4	**6**	**6**

Quarterfinals
8	(Chile) J Fillol	6	3
2	**(United States) A Ashe**	**7**	**6**
