= 1973 US Open – Men's doubles =

Men's doubles
- 1973 US Open

Final
- Champions: (Australia) Owen Davidson (Australia) John Newcombe
- Runners-up: (Australia) Rod Laver (Australia) Ken Rosewall
- Score: 7–5, 2–6, 7–5, 7–5

Details
- Draw: 62
- Seeds: 8

Events
Singles	men	women		boys	girls
Doubles	men	women	mixed	boys	girls
WC Singles	men	women	quad
WC Doubles	men	women	quad
Legends	men	women	mixed
← 1972 ·	US Open	· 1974 →

Cliff Drysdale and Roger Taylor were the defending US Open men's doubles champions, but did not defend their title.

Third-seeded Owen Davidson and John Newcombe won the title by defeating first-seeded Rod Laver and Ken Rosewall 7–5, 2–6, 7–5, 7–5 in the final.

== Seeds ==
Some seeds received a bye into the second round.

1. (Australia) Rod Laver / (Australia) Ken Rosewall (final)
2. (Netherlands) Tom Okker / (United States) Marty Riessen (semifinals)
3. (Australia) Owen Davidson / (Australia) John Newcombe (champions)
4. (Australia) Bob Carmichael / (South Africa) Frew McMillan (quarterfinals)
5. (United States) Stan Smith / (United States) Erik van Dillen (third round)
6. N.A.
7. (Australia) John Alexander / (Australia) Phil Dent (quarterfinals)
8. (Socialist Federal Republic of Yugoslavia) Nikola Pilić / (Australia) Allan Stone (third round)

== Draw ==
=== Key ===
- Q = Qualifier
- WC = Wild card
- LL = Lucky loser
- Alt = Alternate
- ITF = ITF entry
- PR = Protected ranking
- SR = Special ranking
- SE = Special exempt
- JE = Junior exempt
- JR = Junior Accelerator Programme entrant
- CO = College Accelerator Programme entrant
- NG = Next Gen Accelerator Program entrant
- w/o = Walkover
- r = Retired
- d = Defaulted

=== Finals ===
Quarterfinals
2	(Netherlands) Tom Okker (United States) Marty Riessen	5	7	7
(India) Anand Amritraj (India) Vijay Amritraj	7	6	6
3	(Australia) Owen Davidson (Australia) John Newcombe	5	6	6
7	(Australia) John Alexander (Australia) Phil Dent	7	3	4
(United States) Tom Gorman (Mexico) Raúl Ramírez	6	7
4	(Australia) Bob Carmichael (South Africa) Frew McMillan	1	6
(Chile) Patricio Cornejo (Chile) Jaime Fillol	2	7	5
1	(Australia) Rod Laver (Australia) Ken Rosewall	6	6	7

Semifinals
2	(Netherlands) Tom Okker (United States) Marty Riessen	6	7	2	6
3	(Australia) Owen Davidson (Australia) John Newcombe	7	6	6	7
(United States) Tom Gorman (Mexico) Raúl Ramírez	3	6	6
1	(Australia) Rod Laver (Australia) Ken Rosewall	6	7	7

Final
3	(Australia) Owen Davidson (Australia) John Newcombe	7	2	7	7
1	(Australia) Rod Laver (Australia) Ken Rosewall	5	6	5	5

=== Top half ===
==== Section 1 ====
First round
(United States) P Gonzales (Japan) J Kamiwazumi	7	7
(United States) R Barth (United States) S Tidball	5	6
(Australia) R Case (Australia) G Masters	6	6
(United States) J Gorsuch (United States) N Saviano	3	2
(Pakistan) M Iqbal (Pakistan) S Meer	4	2
(United States) C Graebner (New Zealand) O Parun	6	6
(United States) T Kreiss (United States) T Waltke	3	6	3
(Australia) J Gardner (United States) G Hardie	6	4	6
(West Germany) K Meiler (West Germany) H-J Pohmann	6	4	6
(United Kingdom) M Cox (Egypt) I El Shafei	4	6	3
(India) A Amritraj (India) V Amritraj	6	6
(Bolivia) R Benavides (Chile) B Prajoux	3	2
(Sweden) O Bengtson (United States) J McManus	6	6	6
(France) J-B Chanfreau (France) G Goven	4	7	7

Second round
2	(Netherlands) T Okker (United States) M Riessen	6	6
(United States) P Gonzales (Japan) J Kamiwazumi	3	0
(Australia) R Case (Australia) G Masters	4	6	6
(United States) C Graebner (New Zealand) O Parun	6	3	7
(Australia) J Gardner (United States) G Hardie	7	4	2
(West Germany) K Meiler (West Germany) H-J Pohmann	6	6	6
(India) A Amritraj (India) V Amritraj	6	6	7
(France) J-B Chanfreau (France) G Goven	7	4	6

Third round
2	(Netherlands) T Okker (United States) M Riessen	6	6	7
(United States) C Graebner (New Zealand) O Parun	7	3	5
(West Germany) K Meiler (West Germany) H-J Pohmann	1	6
(India) A Amritraj (India) V Amritraj	6	7

Quarterfinals
2	(Netherlands) T Okker (United States) M Riessen	5	7	7
(India) A Amritraj (India) V Amritraj	7	6	6

==== Section 2 ====
First round
3	(Australia) O Davidson (Australia) J Newcombe	6	6
(Australia) P Doerner (United States) A Neely	3	2
(Australia) W Lloyd (Denmark) T Ulrich	7	7
(United Kingdom) J Feaver (United States) B Seewagen	5	5
(New Zealand) I Crookenden (United States) W Higgins	4	6
(New Zealand) J Simpson (India) J Singh	6	7
(United States) V Amaya (United States) P DuPré	6	5	2
(United States) D Dell (United States) S Stewart	2	7	6
7	(Australia) J Alexander (Australia) P Dent	7	6
(Mexico) M Lara (Mexico) J Loyo Mayo	6	4
(Czechoslovakia) J Kodeš (Czechoslovakia) V Zedník	6	6	6
(United States) S Giammalva (United States) D Savitt	3	7	4
(United Kingdom) J Lloyd (United Kingdom) C Mottram	6	6
(United States) S Krulevitz (South Africa) R Seegers	4	2
(United States) B Manson (United States) B Walts	2	4
(Sweden) B Borg (Sweden) R Norberg	6	6

Second round
3	(Australia) O Davidson (Australia) J Newcombe	6	6
(Australia) W Lloyd (Denmark) T Ulrich	3	4
(New Zealand) J Simpson (India) J Singh	4	2
(United States) D Dell (United States) S Stewart	6	6
7	(Australia) J Alexander (Australia) P Dent	6	7
(Czechoslovakia) J Kodeš (Czechoslovakia) V Zedník	4	6
(United Kingdom) J Lloyd (United Kingdom) C Mottram	6	6
(Sweden) B Borg (Sweden) R Norberg	4	0

Third round
3	(Australia) O Davidson (Australia) J Newcombe	6	6
(United States) D Dell (United States) S Stewart	4	2
7	(Australia) J Alexander (Australia) P Dent	6	3	6
(United Kingdom) J Lloyd (United Kingdom) C Mottram	2	6	1

Quarterfinals
3	(Australia) O Davidson (Australia) J Newcombe	5	6	6
7	(Australia) J Alexander (Australia) P Dent	7	3	4

=== Bottom half ===
==== Section 3 ====
First round
(United States) T Gorman (Mexico) R Ramírez	6	6
(United States) W Brown (India) S Menon	3	4
(United States) P Fishbach (South Africa) R Moore	3	4
(Australia) P Kronk (Australia) H Turnbull	6	6
(Australia) C Dibley (United States) C Pasarell	0	6
(United States) P Gerken (United States) R McKinley	6	7
(Spain) M Orantes (Romania) I Țiriac
8	(Socialist Federal Republic of Yugoslavia) N Pilić (Australia) A Stone	w/o
(United States) B Gottfried (United States) D Stockton	6	7
(Australia) D Crealy (Rhodesia) A Pattison	3	6
(United States) A Ashe (United States) R Tanner	6	7
(United States) J Austin (United States) M Estep	3	6
(Australia) J James (Australia) M Phillips	6	5	6
(United States) K Jennings (United States) P Sullivan	3	7	7
(Argentina) E Álvarez (Brazil) T Koch	5	3
4	(Australia) B Carmichael (South Africa) F McMillan	7	6

Second round
(United States) T Gorman (Mexico) R Ramírez	6	6
(Australia) P Kronk (Australia) H Turnbull	4	4
(United States) P Gerken (United States) R McKinley	6	4	6
8	(Socialist Federal Republic of Yugoslavia) N Pilić (Australia) A Stone	3	6	7
(United States) B Gottfried (United States) D Stockton	6	4	6
(United States) A Ashe (United States) R Tanner	3	6	3
(United States) K Jennings (United States) P Sullivan	0	6
4	(Australia) B Carmichael (South Africa) F McMillan	6	7

Third round
(United States) T Gorman (Mexico) R Ramírez	5	6	6
8	(Socialist Federal Republic of Yugoslavia) N Pilić (Australia) A Stone	7	3	4
(United States) B Gottfried (United States) D Stockton	6	4	2
4	(Australia) B Carmichael (South Africa) F McMillan	4	6	6

Quarterfinals
(United States) T Gorman (Mexico) R Ramírez	6	7
4	(Australia) B Carmichael (South Africa) F McMillan	1	6

==== Section 4 ====
First round
(United States) R Kreiss (United States) B Teacher	4	6	7
(United States) R Holmberg (United States) C McKinley	6	4	6
(France) W N'Godrella (South Africa) T Ryan	3	6
(Chile) P Cornejo (Chile) J Fillol	6	7
(United States) C Owens (United States) R Reid	6	4
(United Kingdom) G Battrick (United Kingdom) G Stilwell	7	6
(United States) V Gerulaitis (United States) E Scott	4	4
5	(United States) S Smith (United States) E van Dillen	6	6
(Australia) I Fletcher (Australia) K Warwick	6	6
(South Africa) P Cramer (South Africa) R Mandelstam	4	4
(Italy) C Barazzutti (Italy) A Zugarelli	3	0
(United States) K McMillan (United States) F Ponte	6	6
(United States) H Fitzgibbon (United States) H Richardson	6	7
(United States) J Holladay (United States) B Martin	3	5

Second round
(United States) R Kreiss (United States) B Teacher	6	3	2
(Chile) P Cornejo (Chile) J Fillol	4	6	6
(United Kingdom) G Battrick (United Kingdom) G Stilwell	1	5
5	(United States) S Smith (United States) E van Dillen	6	7
(Australia) I Fletcher (Australia) K Warwick	w/o
(United States) K McMillan (United States) F Ponte
(United States) H Fitzgibbon (United States) H Richardson	6	3	2
1	(Australia) R Laver (Australia) K Rosewall	4	6	6

Third round
(Chile) P Cornejo (Chile) J Fillol	7	6	7
5	(United States) S Smith (United States) E van Dillen	5	7	5
(Australia) I Fletcher (Australia) K Warwick	3	3
1	(Australia) R Laver (Australia) K Rosewall	6	6

Quarterfinals
(Chile) P Cornejo (Chile) J Fillol	2	7	5
1	(Australia) R Laver (Australia) K Rosewall	6	6	7
