= 1975 U.S. Clay Court Championships =

- Date: August 4–11
- Edition: 7th
- Category: Grand Prix (AA); Int. Grand Prix
- Draw: 64S/32D (men); 48S/16D (women)
- Prize money: $100,000 (men) $50,000 (women)
- Surface: Clay / outdoor
- Location: Indianapolis, Indiana; United States

Champions

Men's singles
- (Spain) Manuel Orantes

Women's singles
- (United States) Chris Evert

Men's doubles
- (Spain) Juan Gisbert / (Spain) Manuel Orantes

Women's doubles
- (Uruguay) Fiorella Bonicelli / (Colombia) Isabel Fernández
- U.S. Clay Court Championships

The 1975 U.S. Clay Court Championships was a combined men's and women's Grand Prix tennis tournament held in Indianapolis in the United States and played on outdoor clay courts. It was the seventh edition of the tournament and was held from August 4 through August 11, 1975. Third-seeded Manuel Orantes won the men's singles title and the accompanying $16,000 first prize money while Chris Evert won the women's singles title.

== Finals ==
=== Men's singles ===
(Spain) Manuel Orantes defeated (United States) Arthur Ashe 6–2, 6–2

- It was Orantes' 6th title of the year and the 17th of his career.

=== Women's singles ===
(United States) Chris Evert defeated (Australia) Dianne Fromholtz 6–3, 6–4

- It was Evert's 9th singles title of the year and the 48th of her career.

=== Men's doubles ===
(Spain) Juan Gisbert / (Spain) Manuel Orantes defeated (Poland) Wojciech Fibak / (West Germany) Hans-Jürgen Pohmann 7–5, 6–0

=== Women's doubles ===
(Uruguay) Fiorella Bonicelli / (Colombia) Isabel Fernández defeated (France) Gail Chanfreau / (United States) Julie Heldman 3–6, 7–5, 6–3
