= 1975 U.S. Clay Court Championships – Men's doubles =

Men's doubles
- 1975 U.S. Clay Court Championships

Final
- Champions: (Spain) Juan Gisbert (Spain) Manuel Orantes
- Runners-up: (Poland) Wojciech Fibak (West Germany) Hans-Jürgen Pohmann
- Score: 7–5, 6–0

Events
Singles	men	women
Doubles	men	women
← 1974 ·	U.S. Clay Court Championships	· 1976 →

Jimmy Connors and Ilie Năstase didn't defend their title, they played in North Conway instead. Juan Gisbert and Manuel Orantes claimed the title and $6,000 first-prize money following victory over Wojciech Fibak and Hans-Jürgen Pohmann in the final.

== Seeds ==
A champion seed is indicated in bold text while text in italics indicates the round in which that seed was eliminated.

1. (United States) Brian Gottfried / (Mexico) Raúl Ramírez (semifinals)
2. (Spain) **Juan Gisbert / (Spain) Manuel Orantes (champions)**
3. (Italy) Paolo Bertolucci / (Italy) Adriano Panatta (second round)
4. (Australia) Syd Ball / (Australia) Bob Carmichael (first round)
5. N/A
6. (Poland) Wojciech Fibak / (West Germany) Hans-Jürgen Pohmann (final)
7. (Socialist Federal Republic of Yugoslavia) Željko Franulović / (New Zealand) Onny Parun (quarterfinals)
8. N/A

== Draw ==
=== Key ===
- Q = Qualifier
- WC = Wild card
- LL = Lucky loser
- Alt = Alternate
- SE = Special exempt
- PR = Protected ranking
- ITF = ITF entry
- JE = Junior exempt
- w/o = Walkover
- r = Retired
- d = Defaulted
- SR = Special ranking

=== Finals ===
Semifinals
1	(United States) Brian Gottfried (Mexico) Raúl Ramírez	3	**7**	4
6	**(Poland) Wojciech Fibak** **(West Germany) Hans-Jürgen Pohmann**	**6**	6	**6**
(Argentina) Ricardo Cano (Chile) Belus Prajoux	5	2
2	**(Spain) Juan Gisbert** **(Spain) Manuel Orantes**	**7**	**6**

Final
6	(Poland) Wojciech Fibak (West Germany) Hans-Jürgen Pohmann	5	0
2	**(Spain) Juan Gisbert** **(Spain) Manuel Orantes**	**7**	**6**

=== Top half ===
First round
1	**(United States) B Gottfried** **(Mexico) R Ramírez**	**6**	**6**
(Brazil) T Koch (Brazil) LF Tavares	4	2
**(Austria) H Kary** **(South Africa) B Mitton**	**6**	**6**
(Japan) K Hirai (Japan) J Kamiwazumi	1	3
7	**(Socialist Federal Republic of Yugoslavia) Ž Franulović** **(New Zealand) O Parun**	**7**	**6**
(Australia) A Gardiner (New Zealand) R Simpson	5	1
(United States) P Fleming (United States) B Teacher	5	6
**(South Africa) B Bertram** **(United States) M Estep**	**7**	**7**
4	(Australia) S Ball (Australia) B Carmichael	6	4
**(United States) M Cahill** **(United States) J Whitlinger**	**7**	**6**
(France) J-F Caujolle (France) J-L Haillet	6	3
**(Japan) J Kuki** **(New Zealand) T Parun**	**7**	**6**
6	**(Poland) W Fibak** **(West Germany) H-J Pohmann**	4	**7**	**6**
(United States) J Fort (United States) K McMillan	**6**	5	2
(West Germany) H Elschenbroich (West Germany) U Pinner	1	2
**(Spain) J Higueras** **(Spain) A Muñoz**	**6**	**6**

Second round
1	**(United States) B Gottfried** **(Mexico) R Ramírez**	**7**	**7**
(Austria) H Kary (South Africa) B Mitton	5	5
7	**(Socialist Federal Republic of Yugoslavia) Ž Franulović** **(New Zealand) O Parun**	**7**	**6**
(South Africa) B Bertram (United States) M Estep	5	3
**(United States) M Cahill** **(United States) J Whitlinger**	4	**6**	**6**
(Japan) J Kuki (New Zealand) T Parun	**6**	3	3
6	**(Poland) W Fibak** **(West Germany) H-J Pohmann**	**6**	**6**
(Spain) J Higueras (Spain) A Muñoz	3	3

Quarterfinals
1	**(United States) B Gottfried** **(Mexico) R Ramírez**	**6**	**6**
7	(Socialist Federal Republic of Yugoslavia) Ž Franulović (New Zealand) O Parun	4	2
(United States) M Cahill (United States) J Whitlinger	**6**	1	4
6	**(Poland) W Fibak** **(West Germany) H-J Pohmann**	4	**6**	**6**

Semifinals
1	(United States) B Gottfried (Mexico) R Ramírez	3	**7**	4
6	**(Poland) W Fibak** **(West Germany) H-J Pohmann**	**6**	6	**6**

=== Bottom half ===
First round
(United States) J Delaney (India) S Menon	3	6
**(United States) W Brown** **(United States) S Krulevitz**	**6**	**7**
(Mexico) M Lara (Mexico) J Loyo Mayo	**6**	3	6
**(Chile) P Cornejo** **(Chile) J Fillol**	4	**6**	**7**
**(Argentina) R Cano** **(Chile) B Prajoux**	**7**	**6**
(Bolivia) R Benavides (United States) H Bunis	5	2
(United States) V Amaya (United States) D Dell	**7**	5	3
3	**(Italy) P Bertolucci** **(Italy) A Panatta**	6	**7**	**6**
(France) M Claitte (France) J Laurent	1	3
**(France) J Lovera** **(France) D Naegelen**	**6**	**6**
**(Colombia) I Molina** **(Colombia) J Velasco**	**6**	**7**
(United States) E Dibbs (South Africa) C Drysdale	4	5
**(United States) H Pfister** **(United States) N Saviano**	6	**6**	**6**
(United States) F McNair (United States) S Stewart	**7**	4	3
(United States) G Mayer (United States) T Waltke	1	2
2	**(Spain) J Gisbert** **(Spain) M Orantes**	**6**	**6**

Second round
**(United States) W Brown** **(United States) S Krulevitz**	**6**	**6**
(Chile) P Cornejo (Chile) J Fillol	3	3
**(Argentina) R Cano** **(Chile) B Prajoux**	2	**6**	**7**
3	(Italy) P Bertolucci (Italy) A Panatta	**6**	2	6
(France) J Lovera (France) D Naegelen	6	4
**(Colombia) I Molina** **(Colombia) J Velasco**	**7**	**6**
(United States) H Pfister (United States) N Saviano	2	5
2	**(Spain) J Gisbert** **(Spain) M Orantes**	**6**	**7**

Quarterfinals
(United States) W Brown (United States) S Krulevitz	4	3
**(Argentina) R Cano** **(Chile) B Prajoux**	**6**	**6**
(Colombia) I Molina (Colombia) J Velasco	1	5
2	**(Spain) J Gisbert** **(Spain) M Orantes**	**6**	**7**

Semifinals
(Argentina) R Cano (Chile) B Prajoux	5	2
2	**(Spain) J Gisbert** **(Spain) M Orantes**	**7**	**6**
