= 1973 US Open (tennis) =

- Date: 27 August – 9 September
- Edition: 93rd
- Category: Grand Slam
- Surface: Grass
- Location: Forest Hills, Queens, New York, United States
- Venue: West Side Tennis Club

Champions

Men's singles
- (Australia) John Newcombe

Women's singles
- (Australia) Margaret Court

Men's doubles
- (Australia) Owen Davidson / (Australia) John Newcombe

Women's doubles
- (Australia) Margaret Court / (United Kingdom) Virginia Wade

Mixed doubles
- (United States) Billie Jean King / (Australia) Owen Davidson
- US Open

The 1973 US Open was a tennis tournament that took place on the outdoor grass courts at the West Side Tennis Club in Forest Hills, Queens, in New York City, New York. The tournament ran from 27 August until 9 September. It was the 93rd staging of the US Open, and the fourth Grand Slam tennis event of 1973. It was the first year the boy's championship was held. The 1973 US Open was the first Grand Slam tournament to offer equal prize money to women and men.

== Seniors ==
=== Men's singles ===
(Australia) John Newcombe defeated (Czechoslovakia) Jan Kodeš, 6–4, 1–6, 4–6, 6–2, 6–3

• It was Newcombe's 6th career Grand Slam singles title, his 4th in the Open Era and his 2nd and last title at the US Open.

=== Women's singles ===
(Australia) Margaret Court defeated (Australia) Evonne Goolagong, 7–6, 5–7, 6–2

• It was Court's 24th and last career Grand Slam singles title, her 11th in the Open Era and her 5th title at the US Open.

=== Men's doubles ===
(Australia) Owen Davidson / (Australia) John Newcombe defeated (Australia) Rod Laver / (Australia) Ken Rosewall, 7–5, 2–6, 7–5, 7–5

• It was Davidson's 2nd and last career Grand Slam doubles title and his 1st and only title at the US Open.
• It was Newcombe's 15th career Grand Slam doubles title, his 9th in the Open Era and his 3rd and last title at the US Open.

=== Women's doubles ===
(Australia) Margaret Court / (United Kingdom) Virginia Wade defeated (United States) Rosemary Casals / (United States) Billie Jean King, 3–6, 6–3, 7–5

=== Mixed doubles ===
(United States) Billie Jean King / (Australia) Owen Davidson defeated (Australia) Margaret Court / (United States) Marty Riessen, 6–3, 3–6, 7–6

== Juniors ==
=== Boys' singles ===
(United States) Billy Martin defeated (Rhodesia) Colin Dowdeswell, 4–6, 6–3, 6–3

== Prize money ==
Event		W	F	SF	QF	4R	3R	2R	1R
Singles	Men	$25,000	$12,000	$5,500	$2,500	$1,250	$800	$400	$200
Singles	Women	$25,000	$12,000	$5,500	$2,500	-	$1,250	$800	$400

Total prize money for the event was $227,200.

Preceded by 1973 Wimbledon Championships	Grand Slams	Succeeded by 1974 Australian Open
