= Carrie Fleming =

American tennis player

- Country (sports): United States
- Born: October 26, 1957 (age 67)

Doubles

Grand Slam doubles results
- US Open: 1R (1973)

Grand Slam mixed doubles results
- US Open: 2R (1973)

Carrie Fleming (born October 26, 1957) is an American former professional tennis player.

Fleming, raised in Fort Lauderdale, is one of three children of tennis coach Fred Fleming. Her sister Laurie made it to the professional tour and her brother Scott was a collegiate player for North Carolina State. Growing up their family were friends with the Everts and the children all competed in the same age division as a member of the Evert clan. Fleming shared a rivalry with Jeanne Evert, who often bettered her to the top national rankings for their age group. In 1973 however she won the USTA Girls 18s National Championships and also featured that year in doubles main draws at the US Open. A four-time All-American at Trinity University, Fleming played professionally after college for one year.
