= 1974 U.S. Clay Court Championships =

- Date: August 5–12
- Edition: 6th
- Category: Grand Prix (AA); Int. Grand Prix
- Draw: 64S/32D (M); 32S/16D (W)
- Prize money: $100,000 (M) $30,000 (W)
- Surface: Clay / outdoor
- Location: Indianapolis, Indiana; United States

Champions

Men's singles
- (United States) Jimmy Connors

Women's singles
- (United States) Chris Evert

Men's doubles
- (Romania) Ilie Năstase / (United States) Jimmy Connors

Women's doubles
- (France) Gail Chanfreau / (United States) Julie Heldman
- U.S. Clay Court Championships

The 1974 U.S. Clay Court Championships was a combined men's and women's tennis tournament held in Indianapolis, Indiana in the United States and played on outdoor clay courts. It was part of the men's Grand Prix and women's International Grand Prix. It was the sixth edition of the tournament and was held from August 5 through August 12, 1974. First-seeded Jimmy Connors won the men's singles title and accompanying $16,000 prize money while Chris Evert took the women's title.

== Finals ==
=== Men's singles ===
(United States) Jimmy Connors defeated (Sweden) Björn Borg 5–7, 6–3, 6–4

- It was Connors' 11th title of the year and the 28th of his career.

=== Women's singles ===
(United States) Chris Evert defeated (France) Gail Chanfreau 6–0, 6–0

- It was Evert's 11th title of the year and the 34th of her career.

=== Men's doubles ===
(United States) Jimmy Connors / (Romania) Ilie Năstase defeated (West Germany) Jürgen Fassbender / (West Germany) Hans-Jürgen Pohmann 6–7, 6–3, 6–4

=== Women's doubles ===
(France) Gail Chanfreau / (United States) Julie Heldman defeated (United States) Chris Evert / (United States) Jeanne Evert 6–3, 6–1

== See also ==
- Borg–Connors rivalry
