= 1973 U.S. Clay Court Championships =

- Date: August 13–19
- Edition: 5th
- Category: Grand Prix (B); Int. Grand Prix
- Draw: 64S / 32D (M); 32S / 16D (W)
- Prize money: $90,000
- Surface: Clay / outdoor
- Location: Indianapolis, Indiana, United States
- Venue: Woodstock Country Club

Champions

Men's singles
- (Spain) Manuel Orantes

Women's singles
- (United States) Chris Evert

Men's doubles
- (South Africa) Frew McMillan / (Australia) Bob Carmichael

Women's doubles
- (United States) Patti Hogan / (United States) Julie Heldman
- U.S. Clay Court Championships

The 1973 U.S. Clay Court Championships was a combined men's and women's tennis tournament held at the Woodstock Country Club in Indianapolis in the United States and played on outdoor clay courts. It was part of the men's Grand Prix and women's International Grand Prix. It was the fifth edition of the tournament and was held from August 13 through August 19, 1973. Second-seeded Manuel Orantes won the men's singles title and accompanying $16,000 prize money while Chris Evert took the women's title and the $6,000 first prize.

== Finals ==
=== Men's singles ===
(Spain) Manuel Orantes defeated (France) Georges Goven 6–4, 6–1, 6–4

- It was Orantes' 4th title of the year and the 11th of his career.

=== Women's singles ===
(United States) Chris Evert defeated (United Kingdom) Veronica Burton 6–4, 6–3

- It was Evert's 9th title of the year and the 20th of her career.

=== Men's doubles ===
(South Africa) Frew McMillan / (Australia) Bob Carmichael defeated (Spain) Manuel Orantes / (Romania) Ion Țiriac 6–3, 6–4

=== Women's doubles ===
(United States) Patti Hogan / (United States) Sharon Walsh defeated (Uruguay) Fiorella Bonicelli / (Colombia) Isabel Fernández de Soto 6–4, 6–4
