= 1973 US Open – Women's singles =

Women's singles
- 1973 US Open

Final
- Champion: (Australia) Margaret Court
- Runner-up: (Australia) Evonne Goolagong
- Score: 7–6, 5–7, 6–2

Details
- Draw: 64
- Seeds: 8

Events
Singles	men	women		boys	girls
Doubles	men	women	mixed	boys	girls
WC Singles	men	women	quad
WC Doubles	men	women	quad
Legends	men	women	mixed
← 1972 ·	US Open	· 1974 →

Margaret Court defeated Evonne Goolagong in the final, 7–6, 5–7, 6–2 to win the women's singles tennis title at the 1973 US Open. It was her fifth US Open singles title and record-extending 24th and last women's singles major title, an all-time record that still stands.

Billie Jean King was the two-time defending champion, but lost in the third round to Julie Heldman.

This marked the first time a major offered equal prize money to both men and women. It would take several decades for the other three majors would follow suit, the Australian Open in 2001 and Wimbledon Championships and French Open in 2007.

== Seeds ==
The seeded players are listed below. Margaret Court is the champion; others show the round in which they were eliminated.

1. (United States) Billie Jean King (third round)
2. (Australia) Margaret Court (champion)
3. (United States) Chris Evert (semifinalist)
4. (Australia) Evonne Goolagong (runner-up)
5. (Australia) Kerry Melville (quarterfinalist)
6. (United States) Rosemary Casals (quarterfinalist)
7. (United Kingdom) Virginia Wade (quarterfinalist)
8. (Soviet Union) Olga Morozova (third round)

== Draw ==
=== Key ===
- Q = Qualifier
- WC = Wild card
- LL = Lucky loser
- r = Retired

=== Final eight ===
Quarterfinals
(United States) Julie Heldman	3	3
(West Germany) Helga Masthoff	6	6
4	(Australia) Evonne Goolagong	6	7
5	(Australia) Kerry Melville	3	5
6	(United States) Rosie Casals	1	5
3	(United States) Chris Evert	6	7
7	(United Kingdom) Virginia Wade	6	6
2	(Australia) Margaret Court	7	7

Semifinals
(West Germany) Helga Masthoff	1	6	4
4	(Australia) Evonne Goolagong	6	4	6
3	(United States) Chris Evert	5	6	2
2	(Australia) Margaret Court	7	2	6

Finals
4	(Australia) Evonne Goolagong	6	7	2
2	(Australia) Margaret Court	7	5	6

=== Earlier rounds ===
==== Section 1 ====
First round
1	(United States) King	6	6
(United States) Michel	2	3
(Australia) Krantzcke	6	6
(United States) Walsh	2	2
(United States) Metcalf	5	6	6
(Australia) Harris	7	1	4
(United States) Heldman	6	6
(United States) L Tenney	1	4
8	(Soviet Union) Morozova	6	6
(United States) Stap	3	0
(United States) Greer	6	4
(France) Dürr	7	3	r
(Australia) Bowrey	6	6
(United States) Bostrom	4	1
(West Germany) Masthoff	6	6
(United States) Louie	4	1

Second round
1	(United States) King	6	6
(Australia) Krantzcke	3	1
(United States) Metcalf	7	6	3
(United States) Heldman	6	7	6
8	(Soviet Union) Morozova	6	6
(United States) Greer	2	2
(Australia) Bowrey	6	3
(West Germany) Masthoff	7	6

Third round
1	(United States) King	6	4	1
(United States) Heldman	3	6	4
8	(Soviet Union) Morozova	7	4	2
(West Germany) Masthoff	5	6	6

Quarterfinals
(United States) Heldman	3	3
(West Germany) Masthoff	6	6

==== Section 2 ====
First round
4	(Australia) Goolagong	6	6
(United States) Downs	1	0
(United States) R Tenney	1	6	6
(United States) Hamm	6	3	3
(United States) Ziegenfuss	6	6
(United States) Fretz	3	2
(United States) Evert J	6	6
(United States) Haas	2	2
5	(Australia) Melville	2	6	7
(United States) Kiyomura	6	4	6
(South Africa) Rossouw	2	7	6
(Australia) Paish	6	5	3
(Colombia) Fernández-De Soto	6	3	7
(United States) May	3	6	6
(United States) Fleming	6	6
(United States) duPont	4	2

Second round
4	(Australia) Goolagong	6	6
(United States) R Tenney	0	3
(United States) Ziegenfuss	3	2
(United States) Evert J	6	6
5	(Australia) Melville	6	6
(South Africa) Rossouw	4	3
(Colombia) Fernández-De Soto	6	6	6
(United States) Fleming	7	2	4

Third round
4	(Australia) Goolagong	6	6
(United States) Evert J	2	1
5	(Australia) Melville	6	6
(Colombia) Fernández-De Soto	2	4

Quarterfinals
4	(Australia) Goolagong	5	7
5	(Australia) Melville	3	5

==== Section 3 ====
First round
(United States) Kemmer	7	6
(Soviet Union) Kroschina	6	2
(United States) Richey Gunter	4	7	6
(United States) Teeguarden	6	5	2
(Japan) Sawamatsu	6	6
(United States) Ornstein	2	2
6	(United States) Casals	6	6
(United States) Latham	3	3
(United States) Anthony	6	6
(United States) Hogan	4	1
(Netherlands) Stöve	6	6
(Australia) Gourlay	0	4
(United States) Redondo	6	6
(United Kingdom) Fayter	2	2
3	(United States) Evert C	6	6
(United States) Fox	3	3

Second round
(United States) Kemmer	6	6
(United States) Richey Gunter	4	3
(Japan) Sawamatsu	6	1	2
6	(United States) Casals	3	6	6
(United States) Anthony	6	1	6
(Netherlands) Stöve	3	6	4
(United States) Redondo	2	2
3	(United States) Evert C	6	6

Third round
(United States) Kemmer	3	3
6	(United States) Casals	6	6
(United States) Anthony	4	4
3	(United States) Evert C	6	6

Quarterfinals
6	(United States) Casals	1	5
3	(United States) Evert C	6	7

==== Section 4 ====
First round
(United Kingdom) Burton	5	6	6
(Czechoslovakia) Navratilova	7	1	3
(Australia) Young	7	6	6
(United States) Mehmedbasich	5	7	1
(Australia) Hunt	7	6
(United States) Shoolman	6	1
7	(United Kingdom) Wade	6	7
(United Kingdom) Coles	4	6
(South Africa) Kloss	6	6
(Soviet Union) Birioukova	4	3
(United States) O'Keefe	7	6
(United Kingdom) Beaven	6	4
(United States) Martinez	6	6
(United States) Overton	1	1
2	(Australia) Court	6	6
(South Africa) Pretorius	1	2

Second round
(United Kingdom) Burton	6	6
(Australia) Young	2	3
(Australia) Hunt	3	4
7	(United Kingdom) Wade	6	6
(South Africa) Kloss	6	6
(United States) O'Keefe	2	1
(United States) Martinez	0	1
2	(Australia) Court	6	6

Third round
(United Kingdom) Burton	1	3
7	(United Kingdom) Wade	6	6
(South Africa) Kloss	1	4
2	(Australia) Court	6	6

Quarterfinals
7	(United Kingdom) Wade	6	6
2	(Australia) Court	7	7

Preceded by 1973 Wimbledon Championships – Women's singles	Grand Slam women's singles	Succeeded by 1974 Australian Open – Women's singles
