= 1973 US Open – Men's singles =

Men's singles
- 1973 US Open

Final
- Champion: (Australia) John Newcombe
- Runner-up: (Czechoslovakia) Jan Kodeš
- Score: 6–4, 1–6, 4–6, 6–2, 6–3

Details
- Draw: 128
- Seeds: 16

Events
Singles	men	women		boys	girls
Doubles	men	women	mixed	boys	girls
WC Singles	men	women	quad
WC Doubles	men	women	quad
Legends	men	women	mixed
← 1972 ·	US Open	· 1974 →

John Newcombe defeated Jan Kodeš in the final, 6–4, 1–6, 4–6, 6–2, 6–3 to win the men's singles tennis title at the 1973 US Open. It was his second US Open singles title and sixth major singles title overall.

Ilie Năstase was the defending champion, but lost in the second round to Andrew Pattison.

== Seeds ==
The seeded players are listed below. John Newcombe is the champion; others show the round in which they were eliminated.

1. (United States) Stan Smith (semifinalist)
2. (Romania) Ilie Năstase (second round)
3. (United States) Arthur Ashe (third round)
4. (Australia) Rod Laver (third round)
5. (Australia) Ken Rosewall (semifinalist)
6. (Czechoslovakia) Jan Kodeš (finalist)
7. (Netherlands) Tom Okker (fourth round)
8. (Spain) Manuel Orantes (third round)
9. (United States) Jimmy Connors (quarterfinalist)
10. (Australia) John Newcombe (champion)
11. (United Kingdom) Roger Taylor (second round)
12. (United States) Marty Riessen (second round)
13. (United States) Tom Gorman (fourth round)
14. (Italy) Adriano Panatta (third round)
15. (Socialist Federal Republic of Yugoslavia) Nikola Pilić (quarterfinalist)
16. (United States) Cliff Richey (fourth round)

== Draw ==
=== Key ===
- Q = Qualifier
- WC = Wild card
- LL = Lucky loser
- r = Retired

=== Final eight ===
Quarterfinals
1	(United States) Stan Smith	6	6	6
(New Zealand) Onny Parun	3	3	2
15	(Socialist Federal Republic of Yugoslavia) Nikola Pilić	2	6	1	6	5
6	(Czechoslovakia) Jan Kodeš	6	4	6	3	7
5	(Australia) Ken Rosewall	6	6	6
(India) Vijay Amritraj	4	3	3
9	(United States) Jimmy Connors	4	6	6
10	(Australia) John Newcombe	6	7	7

Semifinals
1	(United States) Stan Smith	5	7	1	5
6	(Czechoslovakia) Jan Kodeš	7	6	6	7
5	(Australia) Ken Rosewall	4	6	3
10	(Australia) John Newcombe	6	7	6

Final
6	(Czechoslovakia) Jan Kodeš	4	6	6	2	3
10	(Australia) John Newcombe	6	1	4	6	6

=== Section 1 ===
First round
1	(United States) Smith	6	5
(France) Proisy	4	0	r
(United States) Martin	6	6	6
(Argentina) Vázquez	0	1	1
(West Germany) Pohmann	2	6	4
(United States) Tanner	6	7	6
(Australia) Masters	4	6	6	6	7
(United States) Graebner	6	7	1	4	5
13	(United States) Gorman	6	6	6
(United States) Dibbs	3	1	2
(Sweden) Bengtson	6	6	6
(United States) Carrington	3	4	3
(Chile) Cornejo	4	6	3
(United Kingdom) Cox	6	7	6
(Mexico) Loyo-Mayo	1	3	6	3
(United Kingdom) Feaver	6	6	4	6

Second round
1	(United States) Smith	6	6	6
(United States) Martin	3	2	1
(United States) Tanner	6	6	6
(Australia) Masters	4	4	1
13	(United States) Gorman	7	7	6
(Sweden) Bengtson	5	5	3
(United Kingdom) Cox	4	6	6	6
(United Kingdom) Feaver	6	4	2	4

Third round
1	(United States) Smith	6	7	6	6
(United States) Tanner	7	6	4	3
13	(United States) Gorman	3	7	6	6
(United Kingdom) Cox	6	5	4	4

Fourth round
1	(United States) Smith	3	7	6	6
13	(United States) Gorman	6	5	3	4

=== Section 2 ===
First round
8	(Spain) Orantes	6	6	6
(United Kingdom) Mottram	3	1	3
(Australia) Fletcher	6	6	6
(South Africa) Seegers	4	1	1
(United States) Seewagen	7	6	7
(Pakistan) Rahim	5	4	5
(Australia) Case	6	6	6
(Sweden) Norberg	4	4	3
12	(United States) Riessen	5	6	6	6
(Brazil) Koch	7	2	3	2
(New Zealand) Parun	6	6	6	3	6
(India) Singh	1	7	3	6	1
(United Kingdom) Lloyd	6	6	6	4	6
(United States) Kreiss	1	7	0	6	3
(Italy) Bertolucci	3	1	r
(New Zealand) Simpson	6	3

Second round
8	(Spain) Orantes	6	3	7	6
(Australia) Fletcher	2	6	5	3
(United States) Seewagen	2	1	1
(Australia) Case	6	6	6
12	(United States) Riessen	3	6	6
(New Zealand) Parun	6	7	7
(United Kingdom) Lloyd	3	6	3	2
(New Zealand) Simpson	6	3	6	6

Third round
8	(Spain) Orantes	1	4	6
(Australia) Case	6	6	7
(New Zealand) Parun	3	6	7	6
(New Zealand) Simpson	6	3	6	1

Fourth round
(Australia) Case	4	1	6	4
(New Zealand) Parun	6	6	4	6

=== Section 3 ===
First round
3	(United States) Ashe	7	6	7	6
(Australia) Dibley	6	7	5	2
(United States) Stewart	6	6	4	6
(United States) Higgins	3	0	6	4
(France) Chanfreau	6	6	6
(Argentina) Vilas	3	3	4
(Sweden) Borg	3	6	6	6	6
(United States) Barth	6	7	4	1	2
15	(Socialist Federal Republic of Yugoslavia) Pilić	7	6	6
(United States) Austin	6	4	2
(India) Amritraj	6	6	6
(United States) Du Pré	2	1	2
(Australia) Dent	6	6	6
(South Africa) Ryan	2	4	2
(United States) Hardie	3	7	6	6
(United States) Froehling	6	6	2	4

Second round
3	(United States) Ashe	6	6	6
(United States) Stewart	4	2	2
(France) Chanfreau	5	6	1	4
(Sweden) Borg	7	2	6	6
15	(Socialist Federal Republic of Yugoslavia) Pilić	7	5	7	6
(India) Amritraj	5	7	6	4
(Australia) Dent	6	5	6	6
(United States) Hardie	4	7	1	2

Third round
3	(United States) Ashe	7	4	4	4
(Sweden) Borg	6	6	6	6
15	(Socialist Federal Republic of Yugoslavia) Pilić	4	6	6	6
(Australia) Dent	6	3	3	1

Fourth round
(Sweden) Borg	4	7	3	4
15	(Socialist Federal Republic of Yugoslavia) Pilić	6	5	6	6

=== Section 4 ===
First round
6	(Czechoslovakia) Kodeš	6	6	6	6
(France) N'Godrella	7	2	1	4
(United States) McManus	6	6	6
(Argentina) Álvarez	3	1	2
(Australia) Crealy	6	6	6
(Czechoslovakia) Holeček	3	3	2
(South Africa) McMillan	4	2	4
(Egypt) El Shafei	6	6	6
11	(United Kingdom) Taylor	6	6	6
(Italy) Zugarelli	4	4	4
(Australia) Alexander	7	7	6
(United States) Gerulaitis	6	6	4
(Australia) Phillips-Moore	4	6	6	6
(New Zealand) Crookenden	6	3	2	1
(South Africa) Drysdale	6	6	6	6
(United States) Dell	7	1	0	3

Second round
6	(Czechoslovakia) Kodeš	7	6	6	6
(United States) McManus	5	3	7	1
(Australia) Crealy	3	5	1
(Egypt) El Shafei	6	7	6
11	(United Kingdom) Taylor	6	6	4	3	5
(Australia) Alexander	3	4	6	6	7
(Australia) Phillips-Moore	3	3	4
(South Africa) Drysdale	6	6	6

Third round
6	(Czechoslovakia) Kodeš	6	7	7
(Egypt) El Shafei	3	5	6
(Australia) Alexander	3	7	6	6
(South Africa) Drysdale	6	6	2	2

Fourth round
6	(Czechoslovakia) Kodeš	7	7	6
(Australia) Alexander	6	5	4

=== Section 5 ===
First round
(Czechoslovakia) Hřebec	6	7	6
(United States) Stockton	2	5	2
(Spain) Muñoz	6	2	6
(Mexico) Ramírez	7	6	7
(United States) Brown	3	7	4	0
(United States) Teacher	6	6	6	6
(United Kingdom) Battrick	0	6	4	6	4
16	(United States) Richey	6	2	6	3	6
(Denmark) Ulrich	4	4	2
(Czechoslovakia) Zednik	6	6	6
(Japan) Kamiwazumi	6	2	6	7
(United States) Andrews	2	6	2	6
(United States) McKinley	6	6	6
(Australia) Carmichael	4	3	2
(United Kingdom) Stilwell	3	2	2
5	(Australia) Rosewall	6	6	6

Second round
(Czechoslovakia) Hřebec	3	6	3	2	4
(Mexico) Ramírez	6	2	6	6	6
(United States) Teacher	6	3	4	6	3
16	(United States) Richey	3	6	6	3	6
(Czechoslovakia) Zednik	6	3	4	7	4
(Japan) Kamiwazumi	4	6	6	5	6
(United States) McKinley	1	3	3
5	(Australia) Rosewall	6	6	6

Third round
(Mexico) Ramírez	2	4	7	6
16	(United States) Richey	6	6	6	7
(Japan) Kamiwazumi	6	1	1
5	(Australia) Rosewall	7	6	6

Fourth round
16	(United States) Richey	3	4	3
5	(Australia) Rosewall	6	6	6

=== Section 6 ===
First round
(United States) Hagey	3	6	4
(South Africa) Moore	6	7	6
(Australia) Stone	6	6	6
(United States) Siegel	3	3	4
(United States) Edlefsen	7	3	3	6	6
(Romania) Ovici	6	6	6	2	7
(United States) Amaya	6	7	3	7	4
14	(Italy) Panatta	7	6	6	6	6
(South Africa) Cramer	7	6	6
(Chile) Prajoux	5	1	2
(United States) Scott	4	6	2
(India) Amritraj	6	7	6
(West Germany) Meiler	6	3	0
(France) Dominguez	7	6	6
(United States) Solomon	0	2	2
4	(Australia) Laver	6	6	6

Second round
(South Africa) Moore	5	1	6	6
(Australia) Stone	7	6	4	7
(Romania) Ovici	1	3	1
14	(Italy) Panatta	6	6	6
(South Africa) Cramer	6	3	7	6	5
(India) Amritraj	3	6	6	7	7
(France) Dominguez	1	3	2
4	(Australia) Laver	6	6	6

Third round
(Australia) Stone	7	6	4	6	6
14	(Italy) Panatta	5	7	6	3	4
(India) Amritraj	7	2	6	2	6
4	(Australia) Laver	6	6	4	6	4

Fourth round
(Australia) Stone	2	2	2
(India) Amritraj	6	6	6

=== Section 7 ===
First round
(France) Goven	6	3	2	6
(United States) Van Dillen	3	6	6	7
(United States) McNair	7	3	7	6	2
(United States) Pasarell	5	6	6	7	6
(Chile) Fillol Sr.	6	7	7
(United States) Estep	1	6	5
(United States) Fitzgibbon	3	3	2
9	(United States) Connors	6	6	6
(United States) Krulevitz	4	6	1	2
(France) Barthès	6	3	6	6
(United States) Gottfried	6	6	6
(Australia) Kronk	4	1	2
(United States) Mayer	6	5	6	1	r
(United States) Gerken	4	7	4	4
(United States) Gonzales	7	3	1	4
7	(Netherlands) Okker	6	6	6	6

Second round
(United States) Van Dillen	6	4	6	3
(United States) Pasarell	7	6	4	6
(Chile) Fillol Sr.	4	6	5	6
9	(United States) Connors	6	4	7	7
(France) Barthès	1	3	4
(United States) Gottfried	6	6	6
(United States) Gerken	5	3	7	6
7	(Netherlands) Okker	7	6	6	7

Third round
(United States) Pasarell	3	4	7	2
9	(United States) Connors	6	6	6	6
(United States) Gottfried	4	6	3	4
7	(Netherlands) Okker	6	3	6	6

Fourth round
9	(United States) Connors	6	6	6
7	(Netherlands) Okker	3	2	4

=== Section 8 ===
First round
(Romania) Țiriac	4	6	4	6	6
(United States) Neely	6	4	6	4	0
(United States) Borowiak	4	6	6	6
(United States) Reid	6	3	2	2
(United States) Delaney	6	6	6	7
(Colombia) Molina	7	1	4	6
(Mexico) Lara	7	3	3	7	3
10	(Australia) Newcombe	6	6	6	6	6
(Australia) Davidson	6	4
(West Germany) Fassbender	3	1	r
(Italy) Barazzutti	2	6	4
(United States) Owens	6	7	6
(Rhodesia) Pattison	7	6	6
(Australia) James	6	2	3
(Venezuela) Hose	4	4	3
2	(Romania) Năstase	6	6	6

Second round
(Romania) Țiriac	6	7	7
(United States) Borowiak	4	6	5
(United States) Delaney	6	3	3
10	(Australia) Newcombe	7	6	6
(Australia) Davidson	1	7	4	7	2
(United States) Owens	6	6	6	5	6
(Rhodesia) Pattison	6	2	6	6	6
2	(Romania) Năstase	7	6	3	4	4

Third round
(Romania) Țiriac	6	3	4
10	(Australia) Newcombe	7	6	6
(United States) Owens	3	4	2
(Rhodesia) Pattison	6	6	6

Fourth round
10	(Australia) Newcombe	6	6	7	6
(Rhodesia) Pattison	7	1	5	4

Preceded by 1973 Wimbledon Championships – Men's singles	Grand Slam men's singles	Succeeded by 1974 Australian Open – Men's singles
