= 1973 US Open – Mixed doubles =

Mixed doubles
- 1973 US Open

Final
- Champions: (Australia) Owen Davidson (United States) Billie Jean King
- Runners-up: (United States) Marty Riessen (Australia) Margaret Court
- Score: 6–3, (Note: Other sources, including The New York Times, Los Angeles Times, Chicago Tribune newspapers, and Max Robertson list the first set score as 6–4.) 3–6, 7–6

Details
- Draw: 32
- Seeds: 4

Events
Singles	men	women		boys	girls
Doubles	men	women	mixed	boys	girls
WC Singles	men	women	quad
WC Doubles	men	women	quad
Legends	men	women	mixed
← 1972 ·	US Open	· 1974 →

Marty Riessen and Margaret Court were the defending champions but lost in the final 6–3, 3–6, 7–6 against Owen Davidson and Billie Jean King.

== Seeds ==
1. (Australia) Owen Davidson / (United States) Billie Jean King (champions)
2. (United States) Marty Riessen / (Australia) Margaret Court (final)
3. (South Africa) Frew McMillan / (United States) Rosie Casals (semifinals)
4. (United States) Jimmy Connors / (United States) Chris Evert (semifinals)

== Draw ==
=== Key ===
- Q = Qualifier
- WC = Wild card
- LL = Lucky loser
- Alt = Alternate
- SE = Special exempt
- PR = Protected ranking
- ITF = ITF entry
- JE = Junior exempt
- w/o = Walkover
- r = Retired
- d = Defaulted
- SR = Special ranking

=== Finals ===
Semifinals
1	(Australia) Owen Davidson (United States) Billie Jean King	7	6
3	(South Africa) Frew McMillan (United States) Rosie Casals	5	3
4	(United States) Jimmy Connors (United States) Chris Evert	4	6
2	(United States) Marty Riessen (Australia) Margaret Court	6	7

Final
1	(Australia) Owen Davidson (United States) Billie Jean King	6	3	7
2	(United States) Marty Riessen (Australia) Margaret Court	3	6	6

=== Top half ===
First round
1	(Australia) O Davidson (United States) BJ King	6	7
(Pakistan) S Meer (Australia) M Tesch	3	5
(United States) R Reid (United States) C Fleming	6	6
(United States) S Siegel (United States) B Goldman	1	3
(India) J Singh (South Africa) I Kloss	7	6
(United States) V Gerulaitis (United States) C Graebner	5	4
(Australia) B Carmichael (Australia) L Hunt	6	6	7
(United States) J McManus (United States) K May	7	1	5
3	(South Africa) F McMillan (United States) R Casals	6	7
(Australia) D Crealy (Netherlands) B Stöve	1	5
(United States) S Smith (United States) M Gengler	6	6
(United States) B Walts (United States) S Mehmedbasich	4	4
(United States) A Ashe (United States) A Gibson	2	2
(France) J-B Chanfreau (United States) M Redondo	6	6
(Australia) R Case (Soviet Union) O Morozova	6	7
(United States) H Richardson (Soviet Union) M Kroschina	1	5

Second round
1	(Australia) O Davidson (United States) BJ King	6	6
(United States) R Reid (United States) C Fleming	1	3
(India) J Singh (South Africa) I Kloss	6	6
(Australia) B Carmichael (Australia) L Hunt	4	4
3	(South Africa) F McMillan (United States) R Casals	6	6
(United States) S Smith (United States) M Gengler	4	4
(France) J-B Chanfreau (United States) M Redondo	3	2
(Australia) R Case (Soviet Union) O Morozova	6	6

Quarterfinals
1	(Australia) O Davidson (United States) BJ King	6	6
(India) J Singh (South Africa) I Kloss	4	4
3	(South Africa) F McMillan (United States) R Casals	w/o
(Australia) R Case (Soviet Union) O Morozova

Semifinals
1	(Australia) O Davidson (United States) BJ King	7	6
3	(South Africa) F McMillan (United States) R Casals	5	3

=== Bottom half ===
First round
(France) W N'Godrella (United States) A Kiyomura
(United States) E Scott (United States) K Kemmer	w/o
(Rhodesia) H Irvine (Australia) H Gourlay	5	3
(Mexico) R Ramírez (United States) J Newberry	7	6
(United Kingdom) J Lloyd (United Kingdom) L Charles	6	4
(United Kingdom) J Feaver (United Kingdom) V Wade	7	6
(Australia) W Lloyd (United States) P Bostrom	6	4	5
4	(United States) J Connors (United States) C Evert	3	6	7
(United States) G Teeguarden (United States) P Teeguarden	4	4
(United States) W Higgins (Soviet Union) E Birioukova	6	6
(Australia) P Doerner (Australia) C Doerner	3	4
(United States) B Seewagen (France) F Dürr	6	6
(United States) Bob Weyman (United States) N Ornstein
(United States) B Manson (United States) R Tenney	w/o
(United States) J Gorsuch (United States) C Meyer	0	0
2	(United States) M Riessen (Australia) M Court	6	6

Second round
(United States) E Scott (United States) K Kemmer	6	4	6
(Mexico) R Ramírez (United States) J Newberry	2	6	7
(United Kingdom) J Feaver (United Kingdom) V Wade	6	3	4
4	(United States) J Connors (United States) C Evert	2	6	6
(United States) W Higgins (Soviet Union) E Birioukova	6	6	5
(United States) B Seewagen (France) F Dürr	7	3	7
(United States) B Manson (United States) R Tenney	0	0
2	(United States) M Riessen (Australia) M Court	6	6

Quarterfinals
(Mexico) R Ramírez (United States) J Newberry	6	3	3^{r}
4	(United States) J Connors (United States) C Evert	2	6	2
(United States) B Seewagen (France) F Dürr	1	5
2	(United States) M Riessen (Australia) M Court	6	7

Semifinals
4	(United States) J Connors (United States) C Evert	4	6
2	(United States) M Riessen (Australia) M Court	6	7

== External ==
- 1973 US Open – Doubles draws and results at the International Tennis Federation
