= Jeff Simpson =

New Zealand tennis player and coach

Jeff Simpon
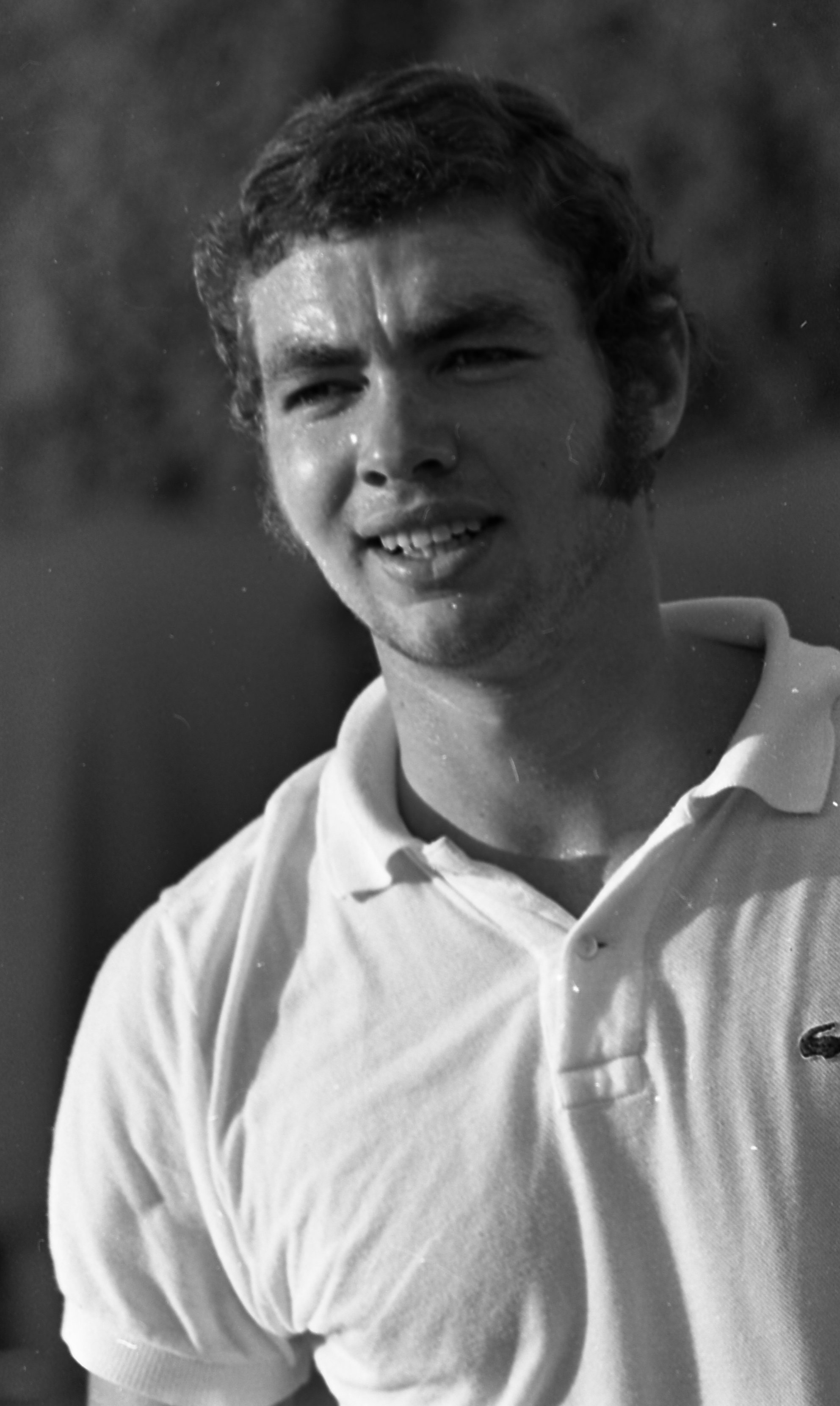
- Country (sports): New Zealand
- Residence: Auckland
- Born: 29 October 1950 (age 76) Hamilton, New Zealand
- Plays: Right-handed

Singles
- Career record: 40–79
- Career titles: 0
- Highest ranking: No. 66 (13 September 1973)

Grand Slam singles results
- Australian Open: 1R (1982)
- French Open: 1R (1974)
- Wimbledon: 3R (1973)
- US Open: 3R (1973)

Doubles
- Career record: 46–72
- Career titles: 1
- Highest ranking: No. 108 (3 January 1983)

Grand Slam doubles results
- Australian Open: 2R (1983)
- French Open: 2R (1983)
- Wimbledon: 2R (1972, 1973)
- US Open: 2R (1972, 1973, 1974)

Jeff Simpson (born 29 October 1950) is a former professional tennis player from New Zealand.

== Playing career ==
Over the course of his career, Simpson competed in five Davis Cup ties for the New Zealand team. He won a total of four rubbers, two in singles and two in doubles.

In 1973, Simpson reached the third round of both Wimbledon and the US Open. Those performances saw him reach his career best ranking of 66.

Simpson was a singles semi-finalist at Newport in 1973 and Auckland in 1975. As a doubles player he was runner-up at three Grand Prix events, in Tokyo, Christchurch and Roanoke.

== Coaching ==
Simpson was New Zealand's Davis Cup captain for 16 years, from 1984 to 1999, as well as Fed Cup captain for five years. He also coached New Zealand in the 1988 Summer Olympics and 1996 Summer Olympics.

== Personal life ==
Simpson is the elder brother of Russell Simpson, who was also a professional tennis player.

His son, Matt, competed for a while on the Futures circuit, retiring in 2013.

== Grand Prix career finals ==
=== Doubles: 4 (1 title, 3 runner-ups) ===
Result	W–L	Year	Tournament	Partner	Opponents	Score
Loss	0–1	Oct 1972	Tokyo Outdoor, Japan	(Mexico) Marcelo Lara	(United States) Dick Dell (United States) Sherwood Stewart	3–6, 2–6
Loss	0–2	Nov 1973	Christchurch, New Zealand	(West Germany) Jürgen Fassbender	(India) Anand Amritraj (United States) Fred McNair	W/O
Loss	0–3	Jan 1974	Roanoke, US	(New Zealand) Ian Crookenden	(United States) Vitas Gerulaitis (United States) Sandy Mayer	6–7, 1–6
Win	1–3	Mar 1975	Washington Indoor WCT, US	(United States) Mike Estep	(India) Anand Amritraj (India) Vijay Amritraj	7–6, 6–3

== Challenger titles ==
=== Singles: (1) ===
No.	Year	Tournament	Surface	Opponent	Score
1.	1982	Le Touquet, France	Clay	(Switzerland) Roland Stadler	6–7, 6–2, 6–1
