= Isabel Fernández de Soto =

Colombian tennis player

Isabel Fernández
- Full name: María-Isabel Fernández de Soto
- Country (sports): Colombia
- Born: 18 September 1950 (age 74)

Singles

Grand Slam singles results
- French Open: 3R (1976)
- Wimbledon: 2R (1974)
- US Open: 3R (1973)

Doubles
- Career titles: 2 WTA

Grand Slam doubles results
- French Open: QF (1971, 1972, 1973)
- Wimbledon: SF (1973)
- US Open: 2R (1972, 1976)

Grand Slam mixed doubles results
- French Open: SF (1973)
- Wimbledon: QF (1972)
- US Open: 2R (1972)

María-Isabel Fernández de Soto (born 18 September 1950) is a former professional tennis player from Colombia.

== Biography ==
Fernández, who is originally from Cali, took a tennis scholarship to the University of South Florida at the age of 19. After a year of college, she joined the international tennis circuit and became the first Colombian woman to play professionally. She made several WTA quarterfinals but was most successful on tour as a doubles player.

She represented Colombia in the 1972 Federation Cup and won five of her six singles matches.

Her two Grand Slam semifinals were both in doubles: the mixed doubles at the 1973 French Open with Jairo Velasco and women's doubles at the 1973 Wimbledon Championships with Fiorella Bonicelli.

Fernández won her first WTA title with Martina Navratilova at the 1974 Virginia Slims of Dallas. The following year, she won another title at the 1975 U.S. Clay Court Championships with Fiorella Bonicelli as her partner.

Since retiring, she has worked as a tennis coach, and she is now a tennis pro at the Sawmill club in New York.

== WTA Tour finals ==
=== Doubles (2–1) ===
Result	W–L	Date	Tournament	Partner	Opponents	Score
Loss	0–1	August 1973	Indianapolis, U.S.	(Uruguay) Fiorella Bonicelli	(United States) Patti Hogan (United States) Sharon Walsh	4–6, 4–6
Win	2–0	March 1974	Dallas, U.S.	(Czechoslovakia) Martina Navratilova	(Australia) Karen Krantzcke (United Kingdom) Virginia Wade	6–3, 3–6, 6–3
Win	2–1	August 1975	Indianapolis, U.S.	(Uruguay) Fiorella Bonicelli	(France) Gail Sherriff Chanfreau (United States) Julie Heldman	3–6, 7–5, 6–3
