= 1972 in tennis =

This page covers all the important events in the sport of tennis in 1972. It provides the results of notable tournaments throughout the year on both the men's and the women's tennis circuits.

== Australian Open ==
Category	Champion(s)	Finalist(s)	Score
Men's singles	(Australia) Ken Rosewall	(Australia) Malcolm Anderson	7–6^{(7–2)}, 6–3, 7–5 (Note: It was Rosewall's 16th career Grand Slam title (his 8th in singles) and his 6th Australian title.)
Women's singles	(United Kingdom) Virginia Wade	(Australia) Evonne Goolagong	6–4, 6–4 (Note: It was Wade's 2nd career Grand Slam title and her 1st Australian title.)
Men's doubles	(Australia) Owen Davidson (Australia) Ken Rosewall	(Australia) Ross Case (Australia) Geoff Masters	3–6, 7–6, 6–3 (Note: It was Davidson's 1st career Grand Slam title and his only Australian title. It was Rosewall's 17th career Grand Slam title and his 7th and last Australian title.)
Women's doubles	(Australia) Helen Gourlay (Australia) Kerry Harris	(Australia) Patricia Coleman (Australia) Karen Krantzcke	6–0, 6–4 (Note: It was Gourlay's 1st career Grand Slam title and her 1st Australian title. It was Harris' only career Grand Slam title and her only Australian title.)
Mixed doubles	Competition not held between 1970 and 1986.		

== French Open ==
Category	Champion(s)	Finalist(s)	Score
Men's singles	(Spain) Andrés Gimeno	(France) Patrick Proisy	4–6, 6–3, 6–1, 6–1 (Note: It was Gimeno's 1st and only career Grand Slam singles title.)
Women's singles	(United States) Billie Jean King	(Australia) Evonne Goolagong	6–3, 6–3 (Note: It was King's seventh career Grand Slam singles title, her third in the Open Era and her first and only title at the French Open.)
Men's doubles	(South Africa) Bob Hewitt (South Africa) Frew McMillan	(Chile) Patricio Cornejo (Chile) Jaime Fillol	6–3, 8–6, 3–6, 6–1 (Note: It was Hewitt's 6th career Grand Slam doubles title, his 1st in the Open Era and his 1st and only title at the French Open.) (Note: It was McMillan's 3rd career Grand Slam doubles title, his 1st in the Open Era and his 1st and only title at the French Open.)
Women's doubles	(United States) Billie Jean King (Netherlands) Betty Stöve	(United Kingdom) Winnie Shaw (United Kingdom) Nell Truman	6–1, 6–2 (Note: It was King's 10th career Grand Slam doubles title, her 4th in the Open Era and her 1st and only title at the French Open.) (Note: It was Stöve's 1st career Grand Slam doubles title and her 1st title at the French Open.)
Mixed doubles	(Australia) Evonne Goolagong (Australia) Kim Warwick	(France) Françoise Dürr (France) Jean-Claude Barclay	6–2, 6–4

== Wimbledon ==
Category	Champion(s)	Finalist(s)	Score
Men's singles	(United States) Stan Smith	(Romania) Ilie Năstase	4–6, 6–3, 6–3, 4–6, 7–5 (Note: It was Smith's 2nd (and last) career Grand Slam title, and his only Wimbledon title.)
Women's singles	(United States) Billie Jean King	(Australia) Evonne Goolagong	6–3, 6–3 (Note: It was King's 8th career Grand Slam title (her 4th in the Open Era), and her 4th Wimbledon title.)
Men's doubles	(South Africa) Bob Hewitt (South Africa) Frew McMillan	(United States) Stan Smith (United States) Erik van Dillen	6–2, 6–2, 9–7
Women's doubles	(United States) Billie Jean King (Netherlands) Betty Stöve	(France) Françoise Dürr (Australia) Judy Dalton	6–2, 4–6, 6–3
Mixed doubles	(Romania) Ilie Năstase (United States) Rosie Casals	(Australia) Kim Warwick (Australia) Evonne Goolagong	6–4, 6–4

== US Open ==
Category	Champion(s)	Finalist(s)	Score
Men's singles	(Romania) Ilie Năstase	(United States) Arthur Ashe	3–6, 6–3, 6–7^{(1–5)}, 6–4, 6–3 (Note: This was the first of Nastase's two career Grand Slam titles, and his only US Open title.)
Women's singles	(United States) Billie Jean King	(Australia) Kerry Melville	6–3, 7–5 (Note: This was the ninth of King's twelve career Grand Slam titles, her fifth during the Open Era, and the third of her four US Open titles.)
Men's doubles	(South Africa) Cliff Drysdale (United Kingdom) Roger Taylor	(Australia) Owen Davidson (Australia) John Newcombe	6–4, 7–6, 6–3
Women's doubles	(France) Françoise Dürr (Netherlands) Betty Stöve	(Australia) Margaret Court (United Kingdom) Virginia Wade	6–3, 1–6, 6–3
Mixed doubles	(Australia) Margaret Court (United States) Marty Riessen	(United States) Rosemary Casals (Romania) Ilie Năstase	6–3, 7–5
