= 1972 French Open =

- Date: 22 May – 4 June 1972
- Edition: 71
- Category: 42nd Grand Slam (ITF)
- Draw: 256S / 64D / 32X
- Surface: Clay / Outdoor
- Location: Paris (XVI^{e}), France
- Venue: Stade Roland Garros

Champions

Men's singles
- (Spain) Andrés Gimeno

Women's singles
- (United States) Billie Jean King

Men's doubles
- (South Africa) Bob Hewitt / (South Africa) Frew McMillan

Women's doubles
- (United States) Billie Jean King / (Netherlands) Betty Stöve

Mixed doubles
- (Australia) Evonne Goolagong / (Australia) Kim Warwick
← 1971 ·	French Open	· 1973 →

The 1972 French Open was a tennis tournament that took place on the outdoor clay courts at the Stade Roland Garros in Paris, France. The tournament ran from 22 May until 4 June. It was the 71st staging of the French Open, and the second Grand Slam tennis event of 1972. Andrés Gimeno and Billie Jean King won the singles titles.

== Finals ==
=== Men's singles ===
(Spain) Andrés Gimeno defeated (France) Patrick Proisy, 4–6, 6–3, 6–1, 6–1

• It was Gimeno's 1st and only career Grand Slam singles title.

=== Women's singles ===
(United States) Billie Jean King defeated (Australia) Evonne Goolagong, 6–3, 6–3

• It was King's seventh career Grand Slam singles title, her third in the Open Era and her first and only title at the French Open.

=== Men's doubles ===
(South Africa) Bob Hewitt / (South Africa) Frew McMillan defeated (Chile) Patricio Cornejo / (Chile) Jaime Fillol, 6–3, 8–6, 3–6, 6–1

• It was Hewitt's 6th career Grand Slam doubles title, his 1st in the Open Era and his 1st and only title at the French Open.
• It was McMillan's 3rd career Grand Slam doubles title, his 1st in the Open Era and his 1st and only title at the French Open.

=== Women's doubles ===
(United States) Billie Jean King / (Netherlands) Betty Stöve defeated (United Kingdom) Winnie Shaw / (United Kingdom) Nell Truman, 6–1, 6–2

• It was King's 10th career Grand Slam doubles title, her 4th in the Open Era and her 1st and only title at the French Open.
• It was Stöve's 1st career Grand Slam doubles title and her 1st title at the French Open.

=== Mixed doubles ===
(Australia) Evonne Goolagong / (Australia) Kim Warwick defeated (France) Françoise Dürr / (France) Jean-Claude Barclay, 6–2, 6–4

Preceded by 1972 Australian Open	Grand Slams	Succeeded by 1972 Wimbledon Championships
