= 1972 French Open – Mixed doubles =

Mixed doubles
- 1972 French Open

Final
- Champion: (Australia) Kim Warwick (Australia) Evonne Goolagong
- Runner-up: (France) Jean-Claude Barclay (France) Françoise Dürr
- Score: 6–2, 6–4

Details
- Draw: 32
- Seeds: 4

Events
Singles	men	women		boys	girls
Doubles	men	women	mixed	boys	girls
WC Singles	men	women	quad
WC Doubles	men	women	quad
Legends	−45	45+	women
- French Open

Jean-Claude Barclay and Françoise Dürr were the defending champions but lost in the final 6–2, 6–4 against Kim Warwick and Evonne Goolagong.

== Seeds ==
1. (France) Jean-Claude Barclay / (France) Françoise Dürr (final)
2. (South Africa) Frew McMillan / (Australia) Judy Dalton (quarterfinals)
3. (Soviet Union) Alex Metreveli / (Soviet Union) Olga Morozova (quarterfinals)
4. (United States) Clark Graebner / (United States) Billie Jean King (quarterfinals)

== Draw ==
Key

- Q = Qualifier
- WC = Wild card
- LL = Lucky loser
- Alt = Alternate
- ITF = ITF entry
- PR = Protected ranking
- SR = Special ranking
- SE = Special exempt
- JE = Junior exempt
- JR = Junior Accelerator Programme entrant
- CO = College Accelerator Programme entrant
- NG = Next Gen Accelerator Program entrant
- w/o = Walkover
- r = Retired
- d = Defaulted

=== Finals ===
Semifinals
(Australia) Kim Warwick (Australia) Evonne Goolagong	4	6	11
(Romania) Ilie Năstase (United States) Rosie Casals	6	4	9
(South Africa) Bob Hewitt (United Kingdom) Virginia Wade	4	6	4
1	(France) Jean-Claude Barclay (France) Françoise Dürr	6	3	6

Final
(Australia) Kim Warwick (Australia) Evonne Goolagong	6	6
1	(France) Jean-Claude Barclay (France) Françoise Dürr	2	4

=== Top half ===
First round
2	(South Africa) F McMillan (Australia) J Dalton	w/o
(Japan) K Hirai (Japan) Y Tanaka
(Italy) A Panatta (United States) K Kemmer	3	6	6
(France) J Thamin (France) D Beillan	6	4	1
(Australia) K Warwick (Australia) E Goolagong	6	6
(Ecuador) E Zuleta (France) J Mauroy-Toffier	1	3
(Australia) B Howe (France) R Darmon	5	10	10
(Soviet Union) T Kakulia (Soviet Union) M Chuvirina	7	8	8
3	(Soviet Union) A Metreveli (Soviet Union) O Morozova	6	6
(Chile) B Prajoux (Chile) M Rodríguez	2	1
(France) J-B Chanfreau (France) G Chanfreau	w/o
(Argentina) R Cano (Argentina) R Giscafré
(Romania) I Năstase (United States) R Casals	6	6
(France) W N'Godrella (France) A-M Rouchon	1	3
(Brazil) T Koch (United States) P Teeguarden	6	6
(France) T Bernasconi (France) O de Roubin	4	4

Second round
2	(South Africa) F McMillan (Australia) J Dalton	6	6
(Italy) A Panatta (United States) K Kemmer	3	0
(Australia) K Warwick (Australia) E Goolagong	6	6
(Australia) B Howe (France) R Darmon	1	3
3	(Soviet Union) A Metreveli (Soviet Union) O Morozova	6	6
(France) J-B Chanfreau (France) G Chanfreau	1	4
(Romania) I Năstase (United States) R Casals	6	6
(Brazil) T Koch (United States) P Teeguarden	1	1

Quarterfinals
2	(South Africa) F McMillan (Australia) J Dalton	2	5
(Australia) K Warwick (Australia) E Goolagong	6	7
3	(Soviet Union) A Metreveli (Soviet Union) O Morozova	6	1	5
(Romania) I Năstase (United States) R Casals	4	6	7

Semifinals
(Australia) K Warwick (Australia) E Goolagong	4	6	11
(Romania) I Năstase (United States) R Casals	6	4	9

=== Bottom half ===
First round
(Brazil) JE Mandarino (Spain) C Mandarino	4	4
(United States) J McManus (United Kingdom) N Truman	6	6
(Chile) JR Pinto Bravo (Chile) AM Pinto Bravo	3	3
(South Africa) B Hewitt (United Kingdom) V Wade	6	6
(Soviet Union) T Leius (Netherlands) B Stöve	7	6
(France) D Contet (France) N Fuchs	5	4
(United States) N Perry (South Africa) L Rossouw	3	2
4	(United States) C Graebner (United States) BJ King	6	6
(France) P Dominguez (Uruguay) F Bonicelli	w/o
(South Africa) P Cramer (South Africa) P Pretorius
(United States) A Olmedo (United States) M Schallau	2	3
(Soviet Union) S Likhachev (Australia) L Hunt	6	6
(Japan) J Kamiwazumi (Japan) K Sawamatsu	1	4
(Chile) P Cornejo (Colombia) I Fernández de Soto	6	6
(Romania) S Dron (Romania) E Dumitrescu
1	(France) J-C Barclay (France) F Dürr	w/o

Second round
(United States) J McManus (United Kingdom) N Truman	0	0
(South Africa) B Hewitt (United Kingdom) V Wade	6	6
(Soviet Union) T Leius (Netherlands) B Stöve	4	7
4	(United States) C Graebner (United States) BJ King	6	9
(France) P Dominguez (Uruguay) F Bonicelli	4	6	3
(Soviet Union) S Likhachev (Australia) L Hunt	6	3	6
(Chile) P Cornejo (Colombia) I Fernández de Soto	4	4
1	(France) J-C Barclay (France) F Dürr	6	6

Quarterfinals
(South Africa) B Hewitt (United Kingdom) V Wade	8	6
4	(United States) C Graebner (United States) BJ King	6	3
(Soviet Union) S Likhachev (Australia) L Hunt	6	5	3
1	(France) J-C Barclay (France) F Dürr	2	7	6

Semifinals
(South Africa) B Hewitt (United Kingdom) V Wade	4	6	4
1	(France) J-C Barclay (France) F Dürr	6	3	6
