= 1972 French Open – Women's singles =

Women's singles
- 1972 French Open

Final
- Champion: (United States) Billie Jean King
- Runner-up: (Australia) Evonne Goolagong
- Score: 6–3, 6–3

Details
- Draw: 32 (8 Q )
- Seeds: 8

Events
Singles	men	women		boys	girls
Doubles	men	women	mixed	boys	girls
WC Singles	men	women	quad
WC Doubles	men	women	quad
Legends	−45	45+	women
← 1971 ·	French Open	· 1973 →

Billie Jean King defeated defending champion Evonne Goolagong in the final, 6–3, 6–3 to win the women's singles tennis title at the 1972 French Open. It was her first French Open singles title and seventh major singles title overall, completing the career Grand Slam in singles. King did not lose a set during the tournament.

The French Lawn Tennis Federation halved the size of the draw from 64 to 32 players in an attempt to attract the top players on tour to the tournament; this change was reverted the following year as results were mixed.

== Seeds ==
The seeded players are listed below. Billie Jean King is the champion; others show the round in which they were eliminated.

1. (Australia) Evonne Goolagong (Runner-up)
2. (United States) Nancy Gunter (withdrew)
3. (United States) Billie Jean King (champion)
4. (United States) Rosemary Casals (first round)
5. (France) Françoise Dürr (semifinals)
6. (United Kingdom) Virginia Wade (quarterfinals)
7. (West Germany) Helga Niessen Masthoff (semifinals)
8. (United States) Linda Tuero (first round)

== Draw ==
=== Key ===
- Q = Qualifier
- WC = Wild card
- LL = Lucky loser
- r = Retired

=== Finals ===
Quarterfinals
1	(Australia) Evonne Goolagong	6	6
(United Kingdom) Corinne Molesworth	2	2
(Soviet Union) Olga Morozova	6	3	2
5	(France) Françoise Dürr	4	6	6
6	(United Kingdom) Virginia Wade	1	3
3	(United States) Billie Jean King	6	6
7	(West Germany) Helga Niessen Masthoff	6	8
(West Germany) Katja Ebbinghaus	3	6

Semifinals
1	(Australia) Evonne Goolagong	9	6
5	(France) Françoise Dürr	7	4
3	(United States) Billie Jean King	6	6
7	(West Germany) Helga Niessen Masthoff	4	4

Finals
1	(Australia) Evonne Goolagong	3	3
3	(United States) Billie Jean King	6	6

=== Earlier rounds ===
==== Section 1 ====
First round
(Australia) Kerry Harris	2	0
(United States) Pam Teeguarden	6	6
Q	(United States) Laura duPont	3	2
(Japan) Kazuko Sawamatsu	6	6

Second round
(United States) Teeguarden	7	8
(Japan) Sawamatsu	5	6

Third round
1	(Australia) Evonne Goolagong	6	7
(South Africa) Patricia Pretorius	2	5
(United States) Teeguarden	7	6	14
(Australia) Kerry Melville	9	4	16

Fourth round
1	(Australia) Evonne Goolagong	6	6
(Australia) Kerry Melville	2	3

==== Section 2 ====
First round
(France) Nathalie Fuchs	5	4
(United Kingdom) Corinne Molesworth	7	6
(United States) Sharon Walsh	2	6	3
Q	(Austria) Sonja Pachta	6	2	6

Second round
(United Kingdom) Molesworth	7	6	6
Q	(Austria) Pachta	9	0	4

Third round
8	(United States) Linda Tuero	3	1
(United Kingdom) Molesworth	6	6
(United Kingdom) Nell Truman	3	1
(Australia) Judy Tegart-Dalton	6	6

Fourth round
(United Kingdom) Molesworth	6	6
(Australia) Tegart-Dalton	2	2

==== Section 3 ====
First round
(Czechoslovakia) Miloslava Holubová	3	3
(Australia) Wendy Gilchrist	6	6
Q	(United States) Barbara Downs	2	0
(South Africa) Laura Rossouw	6	6

Second round
(Australia) Gilchrist	6	3	3
(South Africa) Rossouw	2	6	6

Third round
4	(United States) Casals	6	6
(South Africa) Rossouw	8	8
(Soviet Union) Olga Morozova	6	7
(Australia) Karen Krantzcke	2	5

Fourth round
(South Africa) Rossouw	2	6
(Soviet Union) Morozova	6	8

==== Section 4 ====
First round
LL	(Soviet Union) Marina Chuvirina	5	2
(Netherlands) Gertruida Walhof	7	6
(West Germany) Cora Schediwy	1	3
Q	(Hungary) Erzsébet Széll	6	6

Second round
(Netherlands) Walhof	6	6
Q	(Hungary) Széll	4	2

Third round
5	(France) Françoise Dürr	6	6
(Netherlands) Walhof	3	2
(United States) Wendy Overton	2	6	6
(Australia) Lesley Hunt	6	2	2

Fourth round
5	(France) Dürr	6	7
(United States) Overton	3	5

==== Section 5 ====
First round
(Sweden) Christina Sandberg	3	6	3
(Australia) Patricia Coleman	6	2	6
LL	(Chile) Ana María Pinto Bravo	6	2	7
Q	(United States) Mona Schallau	4	6	9

Second round
(Australia) Coleman	4	3
Q	(United States) Schallau	6	6

Third round
(Czechoslovakia) Neumannová	4	4
Q	(United States) Schallau	6	6
(Netherlands) Betty Stöve	0	1
6	(United Kingdom) Virginia Wade	6	6

Fourth round
Q	(United States) Schallau	4	7
6	(United Kingdom) Wade	6	9

==== Section 6 ====
First round
(Indonesia) Lita Liem	3	1
(West Germany) Heide Orth	6	6
(Czechoslovakia) Alena Palmeová-West	3	7	2
Q	(United States) Nancy Ornstein	6	5	6

Second round
(West Germany) Orth	6	6
Q	(United States) Ornstein	2	4

Third round
(United States) Valerie Ziegenfuss	9	3	6
(West Germany) Orth	7	6	3
(United Kingdom) Winnie Shaw	3	0
3	(United States) Billie Jean King	6	6

Fourth round
(United States) Ziegenfuss	3	1
3	(United States) King	6	6

==== Section 7 ====
First round
(France) Odile de Roubin	2	6	2
(Uruguay) Fiorella Bonicelli	6	0	6
(Sweden) Ingrid Bentzer	2	3
Q	(Colombia) Isabel Fernández de Soto	6	6

Second round
(Uruguay) Bonicelli	6	6
Q	(Colombia) Fernández de Soto	4	4

Third round
(Australia) Helen Gourlay Cawley	6	6
(Uruguay) Bonicelli	4	4
(South Africa) Brenda Kirk	2	1
7	(West Germany) Helga Niessen Masthoff	6	6

Fourth round
(Australia) Gourlay Cawley	6	3
7	(West Germany) Niessen Masthoff	8	6

==== Section 8 ====
First round
(United Kingdom) Jill Cooper	4	4
(West Germany) Katja Ebbinghaus	6	6
Q	(Belgium) Michèle Gurdal	0	0
(Czechoslovakia) Vlasta Vopičková	6	6

Second round
(West Germany) Ebbinghaus	6	3	6
(Czechoslovakia) Vopičková	4	6	4

Third round
(Netherlands) Marijke Schaar	5	5
(West Germany) Ebbinghaus	7	7
(France) Gail Chanfreau
2	(United States) Nancy Gunter	w/o

Fourth round
(West Germany) Ebbinghaus	6	4	6
(France) Chanfreau	3	6	2

Preceded by 1972 Australian Open – Women's singles	Grand Slam women's singles	Succeeded by 1972 Wimbledon Championships – Women's singles
