= 1968 Wightman Cup =

International women's tennis competition

Details
- Edition: 40th

Champion
- Winning nation: Great Britain

The 1968 Wightman Cup was the 40th edition of the annual women's team tennis competition between the United States and Great Britain. It was held at the All England Lawn Tennis and Croquet Club in London, England, United Kingdom.

Great Britain
4
All England Lawn Tennis and Croquet Club, London, England, United Kingdom
1968
Grass

United States
3

			1	2	3
1	(United Kingdom) (United States)	Christine Truman Janes; Nancy Richey	1; 6	6; 8
2	(United Kingdom) (United States)	Virginia Wade; Mary-Ann Eisel	6; 0	6; 1
3	(United Kingdom) (United States)	Winnie Shaw; Jane Bartkowicz	5; 7	6; 3	4; 6
4	(United Kingdom) (United States)	Christine Truman Janes; Mary-Ann Eisel	4; 6	3; 6
5	(United Kingdom) (United States)	Virginia Wade; Nancy Richey	6; 4	2; 6	6; 3
6	(United Kingdom) (United States)	Winnie Shaw / Virginia Wade; Mary-Ann Eisel / Nancy Richey	5; 7	6; 4	6; 3
7	(United Kingdom) (United States)	Christine Truman Janes / Nell Truman; Stephanie DeFina / Kathleen Harter	6; 3	2; 6	6; 3
