= 1972 French Open – Women's doubles =

Women's doubles
- 1972 French Open

Final
- Champion: (United States) Billie Jean King (Netherlands) Betty Stöve
- Runner-up: (United Kingdom) Winnie Shaw (United Kingdom) Nell Truman
- Score: 6–1, 6–2

Details
- Draw: 32
- Seeds: 4

Events
Singles	men	women		boys	girls
Doubles	men	women	mixed	boys	girls
WC Singles	men	women	quad
WC Doubles	men	women	quad
Legends	−45	45+	women
← 1971 ·	French Open	· 1973 →

The women's doubles tournament at the 1972 French Open was held from 22 May to 4 June 1972 on the outdoor clay courts at the Stade Roland Garros in Paris, France. The fourth-seeded team of Billie Jean King and Betty Stöve won the title, defeating the unseeded pair of Winnie Shaw and Nell Truman in the final in straight sets.

== Seeds ==
1. (Australia) Judy Dalton / (France) Françoise Dürr (semifinalists)
2. (United States) Rosie Casals / (United Kingdom) Virginia Wade (quarterfinals)
3. (South Africa) Brenda Kirk / (South Africa) Pat Pretorius (second round)
4. (United States) Billie Jean King / (Netherlands) Betty Stöve (champions)

== Draw ==
=== Key ===
- Q = Qualifier
- WC = Wild card
- LL = Lucky loser
- Alt = Alternate
- SE = Special exempt
- PR = Protected ranking
- ITF = ITF entry
- JE = Junior exempt
- w/o = Walkover
- r = Retired
- d = Defaulted
- SR = Special ranking

=== Finals ===
Semifinals
(United Kingdom) Winnie Shaw (United Kingdom) Nell Truman	6	6
(Australia) Helen Gourlay (Australia) Karen Krantzcke	3	4
4	(United States) Billie Jean King (Netherlands) Betty Stöve	4	6	6
1	(Australia) Judy Dalton (France) Françoise Dürr	6	3	1

Final
(United Kingdom) Winnie Shaw (United Kingdom) Nell Truman	1	2
1	(United States) Billie Jean King (Netherlands) Betty Stöve	6	6

=== Top half ===
First round
2	(United States) Rosie Casals (United Kingdom) Virginia Wade	6	6
(Soviet Union) Marina Chuvirina (West Germany) Cora Schediwy	2	2
(United Kingdom) Winnie Shaw (United Kingdom) Nell Truman	6	6
(France) Nathalie Fuchs (France) Florence Guédy	2	3
(West Germany) Helga Masthoff (Germany) Heide Schildknecht	6	6
(United Kingdom) Corinne Molesworth (United States) Mona Guerrant	2	3
(Australia) Wendy Gilchrist (South Africa) Laura Rossouw	W	O
(France) F De La Courtie-Billat (France) A-M Rouchon
3	(South Africa) Brenda Kirk (South Africa) Pat Pretorius	6	6
(United States) Lucinda Crosby (Uruguay) Lucia Bruce	1	1
(Uruguay) Fiorella Bonicelli (Colombia) I Fernandez-De Soto	6	10
(Sweden) Ingrid Bentzer (Sweden) Christina Sandberg	4	8
(Australia) Helen Gourlay (Australia) Karen Krantzcke	6	8
(Czechoslovakia) Miloslava Holubová (Hungary) Erzsébet Széll	2	6
(United States) Wendy Overton (United States) Valerie Ziegenfuss	6	7
(Indonesia) Lany Kaligis (Indonesia) Lita Sugiarto	2	5

Second round
2	(United States) Rosie Casals (United Kingdom) Virginia Wade	4	6	2
(United Kingdom) Winnie Shaw (United Kingdom) Nell Truman	6	1	6
(West Germany) Helga Masthoff (Germany) Heide Schildknecht	6	6
(Australia) Wendy Gilchrist (South Africa) Laura Rossouw	4	2
3	(South Africa) Brenda Kirk (South Africa) Pat Pretorius	4	3
(Uruguay) Fiorella Bonicelli (Colombia) I Fernandez-De Soto	6	6
(Australia) Helen Gourlay (Australia) Karen Krantzcke	6	10	6
(United States) Wendy Overton (United States) Valerie Ziegenfuss	3	12	4

Quarterfinals
(United Kingdom) Winnie Shaw (United Kingdom) Nell Truman	8	3	6
(West Germany) Helga Masthoff (Germany) Heide Schildknecht	6	6	4
(Uruguay) Fiorella Bonicelli (Colombia) I Fernandez-De Soto	4	1
(Australia) Helen Gourlay (Australia) Karen Krantzcke	6	6

Semifinals
(United Kingdom) Winnie Shaw (United Kingdom) Nell Truman	6	6
(Australia) Helen Gourlay (Australia) Karen Krantzcke	3	4

=== Bottom half ===
First round
(United States) Pam Teeguarden (United States) Linda Tuero	6	6
(France) M-C Brochard (France) Sylvie Rual	4	3
(Australia) Kerry Harris (Australia) Kerry Reid	7	6
(Argentina) Raquel Giscafré (Chile) Ana María Arias	5	2
(France) Gail Chanfreau (France) Rosie Darmon	W	O
(United States) Roylee Bailey (United States) Shari Barman
4	(United States) Billie Jean King (Netherlands) Betty Stöve	W	O
(United States) Julie Heldman (Spain) Carmen Mandarino
(United States) Kristien Shaw (Japan) Kazuko Sawamatsu	0	6	6
(West Germany) Katja Ebbinghaus (Netherlands) Gertruida Walhof	6	3	3
(Australia) Lesley Hunt (Soviet Union) Olga Morozova	6	6
(France) Dominique Beillan (Japan) Yuka Tanaka	3	4
(Hungary) Marie Pinterová (Czech Republic) Vlasta Vopičková	6	5	7
(France) Odile de Roubin (Chile) Michelle Rodríguez	4	7	5
1	(Australia) Judy Dalton (France) Françoise Dürr	W-O
(Romania) Eleanora Dumitrescu (Romania) Ekaterina Rosianu

Second round
(United States) Pam Teeguarden (United States) Linda Tuero	4	3
(Australia) Kerry Harris (Australia) Kerry Reid	6	6
(France) Gail Chanfreau (France) Rosie Darmon	2	2
4	(United States) Billie Jean King (Netherlands) Betty Stöve	6	6
(United States) Kristien Shaw (Japan) Kazuko Sawamatsu	3	3
(Australia) Lesley Hunt (Soviet Union) Olga Morozova	6	6
(Hungary) Marie Pinterová (Czech Republic) Vlasta Vopičková
1	(Australia) Judy Dalton (France) Françoise Dürr	W	O

Quarterfinals
(Australia) Kerry Harris (Australia) Kerry Reid	2	3
4	(United States) Billie Jean King (Netherlands) Betty Stöve	6	6
(Australia) Lesley Hunt (Soviet Union) Olga Morozova	7	2	2
1	(Australia) Judy Dalton (France) Françoise Dürr	5	6	6

Semifinals
4	(United States) Billie Jean King (Netherlands) Betty Stöve	4	6	6
1	(Australia) Judy Dalton (France) Françoise Dürr	6	3	1
