= 1968 French Covered Court Championships =

- Date: 12 –18 February
- Surface: Carpet / indoor
- Location: Paris, France
- Venue: Palais omnisports de Paris-Bercy

Champions

Men's singles
- (Czechoslovakia) Milan Holeček

Women's singles
- (United Kingdom) Nell Truman

Men's doubles
- (France) Patrice Beust / (France) Daniel Contet

Women's doubles
- (Mexico) Rosie Reyes / (France) Monique Salfati

Mixed doubles
- (United Kingdom) Gerald Battrick / (United Kingdom) Nell Truman
← 1967 ·	French Covered Court Championships	· 1969 →

The 1968 French Covered Court Championships was a tennis tournament played on indoor carpet courts. It was the last edition of the French Covered Court Championships before it was taken over by the Paris Open. It took place at the Palais omnisports de Paris-Bercy in Paris, France, and was held from 12 February through 18 February 1968.

Milan Holeček and Nell Truman won the singles titles.

== Finals ==
=== Men's singles ===
(Czechoslovakia) Milan Holeček defeated (Australia) Bob Carmichael 6–4, 10–8, 3–6, 6–3

=== Women's singles ===
(United Kingdom) Nell Truman defeated (France) Évelyne Terras 6–4, 6–1

=== Men's doubles ===
(France) Patrice Beust / (France) Daniel Contet defeated (Australia) Bob Carmichael / (United Arab Republic) Ismail El Shafei 3–6, 10–8, 6–2, 19–17

=== Women's doubles ===
(Mexico) Rosie Reyes / (France) Monique Salfati defeated (France) Janine Lieffrig / (France) Johanne Venturino 3–6, 6–0, 6–3

=== Mixed doubles ===
(United Kingdom) Gerald Battrick / (United Kingdom) Nell Truman defeated (France) Jean-Pierre Courcol / (France) Évelyne Terras 6–2, 1–6, 6–3

== See also ==
- Paris Open
