= 1968 French Covered Court Championships – Men's singles =

Men's singles
- 1968 French Covered Court Championships

Final
- Champion: (Czechoslovakia) Milan Holeček
- Runner-up: (Australia) Bob Carmichael
- Score: 6–4, 10–8, 3–6, 6–3

Events
Singles	men	women
Doubles	men	women	mixed
← 1967 ·	French Covered Court Championships	· 1969 →

Milan Holeček won the title, defeating Bob Carmichael 6–4, 10–8, 3–6, 6–3 in the final.

== Draw ==
=== Key ===
- Q = Qualifier
- WC = Wild card
- LL = Lucky loser
- Alt = Alternate
- ITF = ITF entry
- PR = Protected ranking
- SR = Special ranking
- SE = Special exempt
- JE = Junior exempt
- JR = Junior Accelerator Programme entrant
- CO = College Accelerator Programme entrant
- NG = Next Gen Accelerator Program entrant
- w/o = Walkover
- r = Retired
- d = Defaulted

=== Final ===
Semifinals
(France) Patrice Beust	6	6	1	4	2
(Czechoslovakia) Milan Holeček	4	2	6	6	6
(Australia) Bob Carmichael	2	6	6	6
(United Arab Republic) Ismail El Shafei	6	1	4	4

Final
(Czechoslovakia) Milan Holeček	6	10	3	6
(Australia) Bob Carmichael	4	8	6	3

=== Top half ===
==== Section 1 ====
First round
(France) J-P Olivier	w/o
(France) B Moreau
(United Kingdom) K Weatherley	4	6	1	6	6
(France) A Bouteleux	6	1	6	3	4
(France) P Beust	6	6	6
2	4	2
3	4	7	7	6
(France) T Bernasconi	6	6	5	5	0

Second round
(France) J-P Courcol	6	6	6
(France) J-P Olivier	1	0	2
(United Kingdom) K Weatherley	3	2	3
(United Kingdom) P Hutchins	6	6	6
(France) J-B Chanfreau	2	4	2
(France) P Beust	6	6	6
6	3	6	3	6
(France) P Darmon	2	6	2	6	4

Third round
(France) J-P Courcol	6	6	6
(United Kingdom) P Hutchins	0	1	2
(France) P Beust	6	6	6
1	3	1

Quarterfinals
(France) J-P Courcol	1	6	9	8	4
(France) P Beust	6	4	7	10	6

==== Section 2 ====
First round
(France) P Dominguez	6	4	6	6
(France) J Thamin	2	6	2	4
(United Kingdom) J Clifton	3	6	6	6
(France) P Proisy	6	2	3	3
(France) C Duxin	6	6	6
4	0	3
(France) P Joly	8	6	6
(United Kingdom) D Lloyd	6	3	2

Second round
(Belgium) E Drossart
(France) P Dominguez	w/o
(United Kingdom) J Clifton	6	3	1	8
(France) D Contet	3	6	6	10
(France) J-C Barclay
(France) C Duxin	w/o
(France) P Joly	3	0	5
(Czechoslovakia) M Holeček	6	6	7

Third round
(France) P Dominguez	2	3	2
(France) D Contet	6	6	6
(France) C Duxin	9	3	1	2
(Czechoslovakia) M Holeček	7	6	6	6

Quarterfinals
(France) D Contet	1	4	2
(Czechoslovakia) M Holeček	6	6	6

=== Bottom half ===
==== Section 3 ====
First round
(France) J-L Rouyer	3	6	6	4	6
(France) J L Thiebaut	6	2	2	6	1
(France) F Matheu	6	6	6
(France) H Pelizza	4	3	4
2	10	6	6
(France) G Pilet	6	8	3	4
(France) É Derasse	8	6	6
(United Kingdom) J de Mendoza	6	4	4

Second round
(France) M Leclercq	6	6	6
(France) J-L Rouyer	3	1	2
(France) F Matheu	5	7	15	6	4
(Greece) N Kalogeropoulos	7	5	13	8	6
(United Kingdom) J Barrett	6	6	6
4	3	1
(France) É Derasse	6	4	6	3
(Australia) B Carmichael	8	6	4	6

Third round
(France) M Leclercq	6	6	6
(Greece) N Kalogeropoulos	3	3	2
(United Kingdom) J Barrett	5	3	1
(Australia) B Carmichael	7	6	6

Quarterfinals
(France) M Leclercq	6	5	3	2
(Australia) B Carmichael	4	7	6	6

==== Section 4 ====
First round
(France) J-P Meyer	w/o
(Jamaica) L Lumsden
6	6	4	6
(France) B Dufour	3	4	6	2
(France) D Grozdanovitch	4	4	4
(France) G Goven	6	6	5^{d}
(United Kingdom) J Paish	6	7	6
(Poland) A Licis	1	5	2

Second round
(United Kingdom) G Battrick	6	6	6
(France) J-P Meyer	1	4	4
4	4	4
(Belgium) P Hombergen	6	6	6
(Czechoslovakia) F Pala	6	9	6	6
(France) D Grozdanovitch	2	11	2	1
(United Kingdom) J Paish	6	4	2
(United Arab Republic) I El Shafei	8	6	6

Third round
(United Kingdom) G Battrick	6	5	6	6
(Belgium) P Hombergen	0	7	3	2
(Czechoslovakia) F Pala	8	2	11	3
(United Arab Republic) I El Shafei	10	6	9	6

Quarterfinals
(United Kingdom) G Battrick	6	6	6	5	1
(United Arab Republic) I El Shafei	4	4	8	7	6
