= 1972 French Open – Men's doubles =

Men's doubles
- 1972 French Open

Final
- Champions: (South Africa) Bob Hewitt (South Africa) Frew McMillan
- Runners-up: (Chile) Patricio Cornejo (Chile) Jaime Fillol
- Score: 6–3, 8–6, 3–6, 6–1

Details
- Draw: 57
- Seeds: 8

Events
Singles	men	women		boys	girls
Doubles	men	women	mixed	boys	girls
WC Singles	men	women	quad
WC Doubles	men	women	quad
Legends	−45	45+	women
← 1971 ·	French Open	· 1973 →

Arthur Ashe and Marty Riessen were the defending champions but none could compete this year, as both players were banned for the Grand Prix tournaments during the dispute between the ILTF and the WCT.

Bob Hewitt and Frew McMillan won the title by defeating Patricio Cornejo and Jaime Fillol 6–3, 8–6, 3–6, 6–1 in the final.

== Seeds ==
The top seven seeds received a bye to the second round.

1. (South Africa) Bob Hewitt / (South Africa) Frew McMillan (champions)
2. (Romania) Ilie Năstase / (Romania) Ion Țiriac (second round)
3. (Soviet Union) Sergei Likhachev / (Soviet Union) Alex Metreveli (quarterfinals)
4. (United States) Jimmy Connors / (United States) Tom Gorman (semifinals)
5. (Australia) Lew Hoad / (Spain) Manuel Orantes (third round)
6. (Chile) Patricio Cornejo / (Chile) Jaime Fillol (final)
7. (Czechoslovakia) Jan Kodeš / (Czechoslovakia) Jan Kukal (semifinals)
8. (United States) Jim McManus / (United States) Jim Osborne (third round)

== Draw ==
=== Key ===
- Q = Qualifier
- WC = Wild card
- LL = Lucky loser
- Alt = Alternate
- ITF = ITF entry
- PR = Protected ranking
- SR = Special ranking
- SE = Special exempt
- JE = Junior exempt
- JR = Junior Accelerator Programme entrant
- CO = College Accelerator Programme entrant
- NG = Next Gen Accelerator Program entrant
- w/o = Walkover
- r = Retired
- d = Defaulted

=== Finals ===
Quarterfinals
(Spain) Andrés Gimeno (Spain) Antonio Muñoz	4	6	6
7	(Czechoslovakia) Jan Kodeš (Czechoslovakia) Jan Kukal	6	3	8
3	(Soviet Union) Sergei Likhachev (Soviet Union) Alex Metreveli	6	2	5
6	(Chile) Patricio Cornejo (Chile) Jaime Fillol	3	6	7
(Romania) Petre Mărmureanu (Australia) Barry Phillips-Moore	7	7	4
4	(United States) Jimmy Connors (United States) Tom Gorman	9	5	6
(Brazil) Thomaz Koch (Brazil) José Edison Mandarino	5	3
1	(South Africa) Bob Hewitt (South Africa) Frew McMillan	7	6

Semifinals
7	(Czechoslovakia) Jan Kodeš (Czechoslovakia) Jan Kukal	6	3	4
6	(Chile) Patricio Cornejo (Chile) Jaime Fillol	4	6	6
4	(United States) Jimmy Connors (United States) Tom Gorman	4	6	6
1	(South Africa) Bob Hewitt (South Africa) Frew McMillan	6	3	8

Final
6	(Chile) Patricio Cornejo (Chile) Jaime Fillol	3	6	6	1
1	(South Africa) Bob Hewitt (South Africa) Frew McMillan	6	8	3	6

=== Top half ===
==== Section 1 ====
First round
(Belgium) P Hombergen (Belgium) B Mignot	1	2
(France) É Derasse (Romania) S Dron	6	6
(Spain) A Gimeno (Spain) A Muñoz	3	5
(France) B Montrenaud (France) B Paul	6	7
(Argentina) R Cano (Argentina) G Vilas	5	5
(France) É Huet (France) P Seghers	7	7
Alt	(South Africa) R Moore (Denmark) T Ulrich	2	11
(Italy) C Barazzutti (Italy) P Bertolucci	6	13
(France) P Beust (France) D Contet	5	1
(United States) M Estep (South Africa) T Ryan	7	6
(Greece) N Kalogeropoulos (Rhodesia) A Pattison	9	6	6
(Japan) K Hirai (Japan) K Watanabe	11	1	1

Second round
2	(Romania) I Năstase (Romania) I Țiriac	1	6	9
(Belgium) P Hombergen (Belgium) B Mignot	6	3	11
(Spain) A Gimeno (Spain) A Muñoz	21	6
(Argentina) R Cano (Argentina) G Vilas	19	2
7	(Czechoslovakia) J Kodeš (Czechoslovakia) J Kukal	6	6	6
(Italy) C Barazzutti (Italy) P Bertolucci	2	8	1
(United States) M Estep (South Africa) T Ryan	6
(Greece) N Kalogeropoulos (Rhodesia) A Pattison	1	r

Third round
(Belgium) P Hombergen (Belgium) B Mignot	2	8	4
(Spain) A Gimeno (Spain) A Muñoz	6	6	6
7	(Czechoslovakia) J Kodeš (Czechoslovakia) J Kukal	6	6
(United States) M Estep (South Africa) T Ryan	1	1

Quarterfinals
(Spain) A Gimeno (Spain) A Muñoz	4	6	6
7	(Czechoslovakia) J Kodeš (Czechoslovakia) J Kukal	6	3	8

==== Section 2 ====
First round
(Poland) W Gąsiorek (Poland) T Nowicki	6	2	3
(France) JB Chanfreau (France) P Joly	2	6	6
(Australia) D Crealy (Italy) M Mulligan	w	/	o
(France) JF Caujolle (France) J Thamin
(France) P Dominguez (France) P Proisy	6	6
(Bolivia) E Gorostiaga (Ecuador) E Zuleta	1	1
(Australia) R Case (Australia) J Cooper
(France) J-C Fauvet (France) É Loliée	w	/	o
(United States) C Graebner (Pakistan) H Rahim	4	6	6
(United Kingdom) D Lloyd (Australia) K Warwick	6	4	2
(Italy) A Panatta (Italy) N Pietrangeli	6	6
(France) B Hugon (France) J-P Olivier	1	3

Second round
3	(Soviet Union) S Likhachev (Soviet Union) A Metreveli	6	6
(France) JB Chanfreau (France) P Joly	1	3
(Australia) D Crealy (Italy) M Mulligan	0	4
(France) P Dominguez (France) P Proisy	6	6
6	(Chile) P Cornejo (Chile) J Fillol	6	6
(France) J-C Fauvet (France) É Loliée	1	2
(United States) C Graebner (Pakistan) H Rahim	4	3
(Italy) A Panatta (Italy) N Pietrangeli	6	6

Third round
3	(Soviet Union) S Likhachev (Soviet Union) A Metreveli	7	6
(France) P Dominguez (France) P Proisy	5	3
6	(Chile) P Cornejo (Chile) J Fillol	3	6	6
(Italy) A Panatta (Italy) N Pietrangeli	6	3	3

Quarterfinals
3	(Soviet Union) S Likhachev (Soviet Union) A Metreveli	6	2	5
6	(Chile) P Cornejo (Chile) J Fillol	3	6	7

=== Bottom half ===
==== Section 3 ====
First round
(Chile) J Pinto Bravo (Chile) P Rodríguez	6	2	4
(Romania) P Mărmureanu (Australia) B Phillips-Moore	2	6	6
(Chile) P Apey (Chile) B Prajoux	10	6	6
(United States) A Olmedo (United States) H Solomon	8	8	0
(Soviet Union) T Kakulia (Soviet Union) V Korotkov	w	/	o
(France) F Jauffret (France) J-P Meyer
(Romania) S Mureșan (Romania) I Sânteiu	4	5
(Australia) C Dibley (Australia) G Masters	6	7
(France) A Bouteleux (France) M Leclercq	5	1
(Czechoslovakia) J Hřebec (Czechoslovakia) F Pála	7	6
(Italy) F Bartoni (Italy) P Toci	1	3
(France) P Barthès (France) W N'Godrella	6	6

Second round
(Romania) P Mărmureanu (Australia) B Phillips-Moore	6	6
(Chile) P Apey (Chile) B Prajoux	2	0
(Soviet Union) T Kakulia (Soviet Union) V Korotkov	6	1	3
5	(Australia) L Hoad (Spain) M Orantes	3	6	6
(Australia) C Dibley (Australia) G Masters	6	6
(Czechoslovakia) J Hřebec (Czechoslovakia) F Pála	1	2
(France) P Barthès (France) W N'Godrella	1	4
4	(United States) J Connors (United States) T Gorman	6	6

Third round
(Romania) P Mărmureanu (Australia) B Phillips-Moore	6	8
5	(Australia) L Hoad (Spain) M Orantes	3	6
(Australia) C Dibley (Australia) G Masters	6	3	5
4	(United States) J Connors (United States) T Gorman	4	6	7

Quarterfinals
(Romania) P Mărmureanu (Australia) B Phillips-Moore	7	7	4
4	(United States) J Connors (United States) T Gorman	9	5	6

==== Section 4 ====
First round
(Japan) J Kamiwazumi (Japan) T Sakai	4	3
(Socialist Federal Republic of Yugoslavia) B Jovanović (Czechoslovakia) V Zedník	6	6
(United Kingdom) J Barrett (France) G Deniau	1	4
(Brazil) T Koch (Brazil) JE Mandarino	6	6
(West Germany) J Fassbender (West Germany) HJ Pohmann
(Soviet Union) T Leius (United Kingdom) J Paish	w	/	o
(France) F Battegay (France) T Bernasconi	3	3
8	(United States) J McManus (United States) J Osborne	6	6
(France) B De Troye (France) P Hagelauer
(Hungary) S Baranyi (Hungary) P Szőke	w	/	o
(Australia) R Rheinberger (United States) S Turner	3	2
(France) JC Barclay (New Zealand) O Parun	6	6
(France) M Claitte (France) J Laurent	3	1
(Italy) E Di Matteo (Italy) A Zugarelli	6	6

Second round
(Socialist Federal Republic of Yugoslavia) B Jovanović (Czechoslovakia) V Zedník	3	1
(Brazil) T Koch (Brazil) JE Mandarino	6	6
(Soviet Union) T Leius (United Kingdom) J Paish	4	6
8	(United States) J McManus (United States) J Osborne	6	8
(Hungary) S Baranyi (Hungary) P Szőke	3	3
(France) JC Barclay (New Zealand) O Parun	6	6
(Italy) E Di Matteo (Italy) A Zugarelli	2	0
1	(South Africa) B Hewitt (South Africa) F McMillan	6	6

Third round
(Brazil) T Koch (Brazil) JE Mandarino	5	6	6
8	(United States) J McManus (United States) J Osborne	7	3	3
(France) JC Barclay (New Zealand) O Parun	5	1
1	(South Africa) B Hewitt (South Africa) F McMillan	7	6

Quarterfinals
(Brazil) T Koch (Brazil) JE Mandarino	5	3
1	(South Africa) B Hewitt (South Africa) F McMillan	7	6
