= Betty Stöve =

Dutch tennis player (born 1945)

- Stöve in 1966
- Full name: Betty Flippina Stöve
- ITF name: Betty Stove
- Country (sports): Netherlands
- Residence: Brasschaat, Belgium
- Born: 24 June 1945 (age 81) Rotterdam, Netherlands
- Height: 1.80 m (5 ft 11 in)
- Retired: 1983
- Plays: Right-handed
- Prize money: US$1,047,356

Singles
- Career record: 190–151
- Career titles: 1
- Highest ranking: No. 5 (3 July 1977)

Grand Slam singles results
- Australian Open: 3R (1967, 1980)
- French Open: 3R (1965, 1971, 1972, 1973, 1979)
- Wimbledon: F (1977)
- US Open: SF (1977)

Doubles
- Career record: 0–1
- Career titles: 78
- Highest ranking: No. 1

Grand Slam doubles results
- Australian Open: SF (1967)
- French Open: W (1972, 1979)
- Wimbledon: W (1972)
- US Open: W (1972, 1977, 1979)

Other doubles tournaments
- Tour Finals: W (1976, 1977, 1979)

Mixed doubles
- Career titles: 4

Grand Slam mixed doubles results
- Australian Open: —
- French Open: F (1973, 1981)
- Wimbledon: W (1978, 1981)
- US Open: W (1977, 1978)

Betty Flippina Stöve (born 24 June 1945) is a Dutch former professional tennis player. She is best known for reaching the ladies' singles final, the ladies' doubles final and the mixed doubles final during the same year at Wimbledon in 1977, but she lost in all three. She won ten major titles in women's doubles and mixed doubles.

== Career ==
Stöve began playing tennis internationally in the mid-1960s. She made her Grand Slam debut at the 1964 Wimbledon. A virus, complicated by a malfunctioning thyroid gland, forced Stöve out of tennis for an 18-month period in the late 1960s. Despite being advised that she should never play tennis again, Stöve recovered to have her best years on the circuit.

Stöve was an accomplished singles player reaching several finals on tour and attaining a singles ranking of world No. 5 in July 1977. Stöve's best grand slam singles performance was at the 1977 Wimbledon where she reached the final beating fellow doubles partner Martina Navratilova en route in the quarterfinals, and Sue Barker in the semi-finals preventing an all-England final. She lost the final in three sets to third-seeded Virginia Wade. Queen Elizabeth II attended the final. In addition she also reached the final of the doubles (with Navratilova) and the mixed doubles with Frew McMillan, but won neither of them. She is notably the last player in any Grand Slam event to earn such a record. Later that year Stöve was also a semifinalist at the 1977 US Open, losing to eventual champion Chris Evert. This time she won the women's doubles with Navratilova and the mixed doubles with McMillan. In 1978 Stove reached the semi-finals or better at nine of the singles events she contested reaching five finals but failing to win any of them. Between 1963 and 1983, she achieved an overall record of 541 wins to 395 losses with slightly more than half of her matches occurring before the Open Era. Notable players she beat in singles include Martina Navratilova, Evonne Goolagong, Sue Barker, Maria Bueno, Virginia Ruzici, Tracy Austin, Kerry Reid, Billie Jean King, and Claudia Kohde-Kilsch. One notable player she was never able to beat was Chris Evert, to whom she lost on every one of the ten occasions they played.

Stöve had her greatest success in doubles. She won ten major doubles championships, six in women's doubles and four in mixed doubles. She won two women's doubles championships with Billie Jean King and two with Wendy Turnbull. Her other two titles were won with Françoise Dürr and Martina Navratilova. All of her mixed doubles championships were with Frew McMillan. Stöve was the runner-up in 17 Grand Slam doubles tournaments, eight in women's doubles and nine in mixed doubles. She won a total of 78 doubles titles on tour and ranked World No. 1 in doubles.

She competed for the Netherlands Fed Cup team in 1966, 1969, 1970–1972, and 1976–1983.

Stöve was elected treasurer at the founding meeting of the Women's Tennis Association on June 21, 1973. At that meeting Stöve was asked by Billy Jean King to block the exit, saying: 'don't let anybody out until we have an association'.

== Post-retirement activity ==
Stöve coached Hana Mandlíková from 1980 through 1990. She also coached Kristie Boogert.

Stöve is a former member of the ITF Committee of Management, its first female member.

She served three terms as president of WTA Tour Players Association and received the WTA Tour Honorary Membership Award in November 1987.

In 1989, Stöve and Mandlíková wrote Total Tennis, a tennis instruction book. Stöve speaks six languages, and she is an accomplished photographer.

== Grand Slam tournament timelines ==
Key
W	F	SF	QF	#R	RR	Q#	DNQ	A	NH

(W) winner; (F) finalist; (SF) semifinalist; (QF) quarterfinalist; (#R) rounds 4, 3, 2, 1; (RR) round-robin stage; (Q#) qualification round; (DNQ) did not qualify; (A) absent; (NH) not held; (SR) strike rate (events won / competed); (W–L) win–loss record.

=== Singles ===
Tournament	1964	1965	1966	1967	1968	1969	1970	1971	1972	1973	1974	1975	1976	1977		1978	1979	1980	1981	1982	Career SR
Australian Open	A	A	A	3R	A	A	A	A	A	A	A	A	A	A	A	A	A	3R	2R	2R	0 / 4
French Open	A	3R	A	2R	A	A	1R	3R	1R	3R	A	A	A	A		A	3R	2R	1R	2R	0 / 10
Wimbledon	2R	1R	3R	2R	A	2R	2R	2R	4R	1R	1R	QF	4R	F		4R	4R	3R	2R	A	0 / 17
US Open	1R	A	A	A	A	A	A	1R	3R	2R	2R	2R	1R	SF		4R	2R	1R	1R	1R	0 / 13
SR	0 / 2	0 / 2	0 / 1	0 / 3	0 / 0	0 / 1	0 / 2	0 / 3	0 / 3	0 / 3	0 / 2	0 / 2	0 / 2	0 / 2		0 / 2	0 / 3	0 / 4	0 / 4	0 / 3	0 / 44
Year-end ranking												22	7	7		8	22	28	123	47	

=== Doubles ===
Tournament	1967	1968	1969	1970	1971	1972	1973	1974	1975	1976	1977		1978	1979	1980	1981	1982	1983	1984	1985	Career SR
Australian Open	SF	A	A	A	A	A	A	A	A	A	A	A	A	A	QF	QF	2R	1R	A	A	0–5
French Open	A	A	A	QF	QF	W	F	A	A	A	A		A	W	SF	3R	3R	1R	A	A	2–9
Wimbledon	A	A	3R	3R	1R	W	F	QF	F	F	F		3R	F	QF	A	2R	2R	1R	A	1–15
US Open	A	A	A	A	QF	W	QF	F	SF	QF	W		1R	W	F	3R	3R	1R	1R	1R	3–15

Note: The Australian Open was held twice in 1977, in January and December.

== Grand Slam tournament finals ==
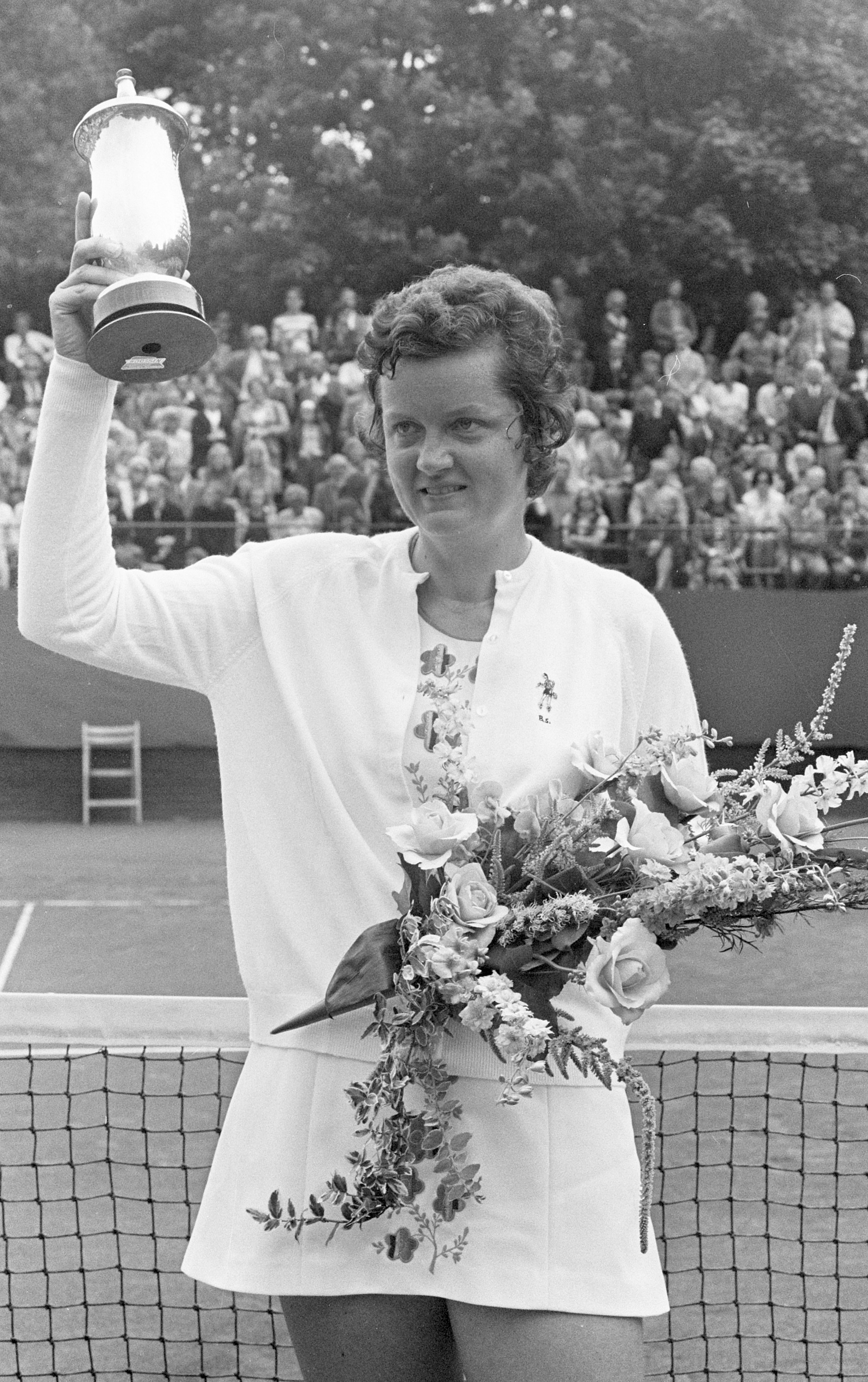
Betty Stöve in 1972

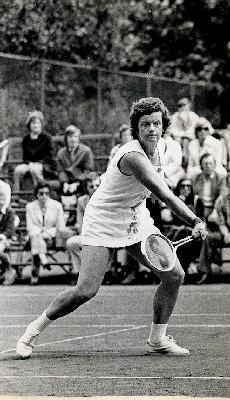
Betty Stöve in 1973

=== Singles (1 runner-up) ===
Result	Year	Championship	Surface	Opponent	Score
Loss	1977	Wimbledon	Grass	(United Kingdom) Virginia Wade	6–4, 3–6, 2–6

=== Doubles: 14 (6 titles, 8 runner-ups) ===
Result	Year	Championship	Surface	Partner	Opponents	Score
Win	1972	French Open	Clay	(United States) Billie Jean King	(United Kingdom) Winnie Shaw (United Kingdom) Nell Truman	6–1, 6–2
Win	1972	Wimbledon	Grass	(United States) Billie Jean King	(France) Françoise Dürr (Australia) Judy Tegart Dalton	6–2, 4–6, 6–3
Win	1972	US Open	Grass	(France) Françoise Dürr	(Australia) Margaret Court (United Kingdom) Virginia Wade	6–3, 1–6, 6–3
Loss	1973	French Open	Clay	(France) Françoise Dürr	(Australia) Margaret Court (United Kingdom) Virginia Wade	2–6, 3–6
Loss	1973	Wimbledon	Grass	(France) Françoise Dürr	(United States) Rosie Casals (United States) Billie Jean King	1–6, 6–4, 5–7
Loss	1974	US Open	Grass	(France) Françoise Dürr	(United States) Rosie Casals (United States) Billie Jean King	6–7, 7–6, 4–6
Loss	1975	Wimbledon	Grass	(France) Françoise Dürr	(United States) Ann Kiyomura (Japan) Kazuko Sawamatsu	5–7, 6–1, 5–7
Loss	1976	Wimbledon	Grass	(United States) Billie Jean King	(United States) Chris Evert (United States) Martina Navratilova	1–6, 6–3, 5–7
Loss	1977	Wimbledon	Grass	(United States) Martina Navratilova	(Australia) Helen Gourlay (United States) JoAnne Russell	3–6, 3–6
Win	1977	US Open (2)	Clay	(United States) Martina Navratilova	(United States) Renée Richards (United States) Betty-Ann Stuart	6–1, 7–6
Win	1979	French Open (2)	Clay	(Australia) Wendy Turnbull	(France) Françoise Dürr (United Kingdom) Virginia Wade	3–6, 7–5, 6–4
Loss	1979	Wimbledon	Grass	(Australia) Wendy Turnbull	(United States) Billie Jean King (United States) Martina Navratilova	7–5, 3–6, 2–6
Win	1979	US Open (3)	Hard	(Australia) Wendy Turnbull	(United States) Billie Jean King (United States) Martina Navratilova	6–4, 6–3
Loss	1980	US Open	Hard	(United States) Pam Shriver	(United States) Billie Jean King (United States) Martina Navratilova	6–7, 5–7

=== Mixed doubles: 13 (4 titles, 9 runners-up) ===
Result	Year	Championship	Surface	Partner	Opponents	Score
Loss	1971	US Open	Grass	(South Africa) Bob Maud	(United States) Billie Jean King (Australia) Owen Davidson	3–6, 5–7
Loss	1973	French Open	Clay	(France) Patrice Dominguez	(France) Françoise Dürr (France) Jean-Claude Barclay	1–6, 4–6
Loss	1975	Wimbledon	Grass	(Australia) Allan Stone	(Australia) Margaret Court (United States) Marty Riessen	4–6, 5–7
Loss	1976	US Open	Clay	(South Africa) Frew McMillan	(United States) Billie Jean King (Australia) Phil Dent	6–3, 2–6, 5–7
Loss	1977	Wimbledon	Grass	(South Africa) Frew McMillan	(South Africa) Greer Stevens (Australia) Bob Hewitt	6–3, 5–7, 4–6
Win	1977	US Open	Clay	(South Africa) Frew McMillan	(United States) Billie Jean King (United States) Vitas Gerulaitis	6–2, 3–6, 6–3
Win	1978	Wimbledon	Grass	(South Africa) Frew McMillan	(United States) Billie Jean King (Australia) Ray Ruffels	6–2, 6–2
Win	1978	US Open	Hard	(South Africa) Frew McMillan	(United States) Billie Jean King (Australia) Ray Ruffels	6–3, 7–6
Loss	1979	Wimbledon	Grass	(South Africa) Frew McMillan	(South Africa) Greer Stevens (Australia) Bob Hewitt	5–7, 6–7
Loss	1979	US Open	Hard	(South Africa) Frew McMillan	(South Africa) Greer Stevens (Australia) Bob Hewitt	3–6, 5–7
Loss	1980	US Open	Hard	(South Africa) Frew McMillan	(Australia) Wendy Turnbull (United States) Marty Riessen	5–7, 2–6
Loss	1981	French Open	Clay	(United States) Fred McNair	(United States) Andrea Jaeger (United States) Jimmy Arias	6–7, 4–6
Win	1981	Wimbledon	Grass	(South Africa) Frew McMillan	(United States) Tracy Austin (United States) John Austin	4–6, 7–6, 6–3

== Year-End Championships finals ==
=== Doubles: 3 (1 title, 2 runner-ups) ===
Result	Year	Championship	Surface	Partner	Opponents	Score
Loss	1973	New York City	Carpet (i)	(France) Françoise Dürr	(United States) Rosie Casals (Australia) Margaret Court	2–6, 4–6
Loss	1974	Los Angeles	Carpet (i)	(France) Françoise Dürr	(United States) Rosie Casals (United States) Billie Jean King	1–6, 7–6, 5–7
Win	1979	New York City	Carpet (i)	(France) Françoise Dürr	(United Kingdom) Sue Barker (United States) Ann Kiyomura	7–6, 7–6

== Career finals ==
=== Singles 16 (4 titles, 12 runner-ups) ===
Result	W/L	Date	Tournament	Surface	Opponent	Score
Win	1–0	Jul 1966	Bristol, UK	Grass	(Argentina) Norma Baylon	6–3, 7–5
Loss	1–1	Feb 1971	Christchurch, New Zealand	Grass	(Australia) Evonne Goolagong	1–6, 4–6
Win	2–1	Jul 1972	Hilversum, Netherlands	Clay	(Netherlands) Marijke Schaar	7–5, 6–3
Win	3–1	Jul 1973	Hilversum, Netherlands	Clay	(West Germany) Helga Masthoff	7–5, 6–2
Loss	3–2	Aug 1973	Denver, US	Hard	(United States) Billie Jean King	4–6, 2–6
Loss	3–3	Sep 1976	Atlanta, US	Carpet (i)	(United Kingdom) Virginia Wade	7–5, 5–7, 5–7
Win	4–3	Oct 1976	Tokyo, Japan	Carpet (i)	(Australia) Margaret Court	1–6, 6–4, 6–3
Loss	4–4	Dec 1976	Sydney, Australia	Grass	(United States) Martina Navratilova	5–7, 2–6
Loss	4–5	July 1977	Wimbledon	Grass	(United Kingdom) Virginia Wade	6–4, 3–6, 1–6
Loss	4–6	Oct 1977	São Paulo, Brazil	Hard	(United States) Billie Jean King	6–1, 6–4
Loss	4–7	Jan 1978	Washington, US	Carpet (i)	(Czechoslovakia) Martina Navratilova	5–7, 4–6
Loss	4–8	Feb 1978	Seattle, US	Carpet (i)	(Czechoslovakia) Martina Navratilova	1–6, 6–1, 1–6
Loss	4–9	Sept 1978	Tokyo, Japan	Carpet (i)	(United Kingdom) Virginia Wade	4–6, 6–7
Loss	4–10	Oct 1978	Brighton, UK	Carpet (i)	(Romania) Virginia Ruzici	7–5, 2–6, 5–7
Loss	4–11	Oct 1978	Stuttgart, West Germany	Hard	(United States) Tracy Austin	3–6, 3–6
Loss	4–12	Nov 1979	Stockholm, Sweden	Hard	(United States) Billie Jean King	3–6, 7–6, 5–7

(*) Note: Tokyo was a non-tour event in 1976, and some events listed above are before the inception of the WTA in June 1973.

=== Doubles 138 (78 titles, 60 runner-ups) ===
Result	W/L	Date	Tournament	Surface	Partner	Opponents	Score
Loss	0–0	Aug 1966	Hilversum, Netherlands	Clay	(Australia) Gail Sherriff	(Netherlands) Elly Krocké (South Africa) Annette Van Zyl	3–6, 6–2, 1–6
Loss	0–0	Jul 1970	Gstaad, Switzerland	Clay	(West Germany) Helga Niessen	(United States) Rosie Casals (France) Françoise Dürr	2–6, 2–6
Loss	0–0	Oct 1970	Edinburgh, UK	Hard (i)	(United States) Sharon Walsh	(France) Françoise Dürr (United States) Patti Hogan	8–10, 6–3, 9–11
Loss	0–0	Oct 1970	Aberavon, UK	Hard (i)	(France) Françoise Dürr	(United Kingdom) Ann Jones (United Kingdom) Virginia Wade	4–6, 3–6
Win	1–0	Apr 1971	Monte Carlo, Monaco	Clay	(West Germany) Katja Ebbinghaus	(Italy) Lucia Bassi (Italy) Lea Pericoli	6–4, 6–3
Win	2–0	Apr 1971	Buenos Aires, Argentina	Clay	(Soviet Union) Olga Morozova	(Argentina) Beatriz Araujo (Argentina) Ines Roget	7–5, 6–1
Win	3–0	Jul 1971	Dublin, Ireland	Grass	(Australia) Lesley Bowrey	(Australia) Margaret Court (Australia) Evonne Goolagong	7–5, 6–1
Win	4–0	Aug 1971	Hilversum, Netherlands	Clay	(Sweden) Christina Sandberg	(West Germany) Katja Ebbinghaus (Netherlands) Trudy Walhof	6–1, 6–2
Loss	4–1	Sep 1971	Louisville, US		(Australia) Kerry Melville	(France) Françoise Dürr (Australia) Judy Tegart-Dalton	6–2, 4–6, 3–6
Loss	4–2	May 1972	Bournemoutth, UK	Clay	(South Africa) Brenda Kirk	(Australia) Evonne Goolagong (Australia) Helen Gourlay	5–7, 1–6
Win	5–2	Jun 1972	French Open	Clay	(United States) Billie Jean King	(United Kingdom) Winnie Shaw (United Kingdom) Nell Truman	6–1, 6–2
Win	6–2	Jun 1972	Eastbourne, UK	Grass	(Australia) Lesley Hunt	(France) Françoise Dürr (Australia) Judy Tegart Dalton	6–4, 6–8, 6–3
Win	7–2	Jul 1972	Wimbledon	Grass	(United States) Billie Jean King	(France) Françoise Dürr (Australia) Judy Tegart Dalton	6–2, 4–6, 6–3
Win	8–2	Jul 1972	Newport, UK	Grass	(Australia) Judy Dalton	(Australia) Kerry Harris (Australia) Kerry Melville	7–5, 6–4
Win	9–2	Aug 1972	Hilversum, Netherlands	Clay	(Belgium) Michèle Gurdal	(Indonesia) Lita Liem (Indonesia) Lany Kaligis	6–4, 6–0
Win	10–2	Sep 1972	US Open	Grass	(France) Françoise Dürr	(Australia) Margaret Court (United Kingdom) Virginia Wade	6–3, 1–6, 6–3
Loss	10–3	Oct 1972	Phoenix, US	Hard	(France) Françoise Dürr	(United States) Rosie Casals (United States) Wendy Overton	6–4, 6–3
Loss	0–0	Oct 1972	Edinburgh, UK	Hard (i)	(United States) Julie Heldman	(Australia) Margaret Court (United Kingdom) Virginia Wade	2–6, 3–6
Loss	0–0	Nov 1972	Aberavon, UK	Hard (i)	(United States) Julie Heldman	(Australia) Margaret Court (United Kingdom) Virginia Wade	0–6, 3–6
Win	11–3	Feb 1973	Miami, US	Hard	(France) Françoise Dürr	(United States) Rosie Casals (United States) Billie Jean King	4–6, 6–2, 6–3
Loss	11–4	Mar 1973	Detroit, US	Carpet (i)	(Australia) Karen Krantzcke	(United States) Rosemary Casals (United States) Billie Jean King	3–6, 6–3, 1–6
Loss	11–5	Mar 1973	Chicago, US	Carpet (i)	(Australia) Karen Krantzcke	(United States) Rosemary Casals (United States) Billie Jean King	4–6, 2–6
Loss	11–6	Mar 1973	Richmond, US	Clay (i)	(Australia) Karen Krantzcke	(Australia) Margaret Court (Australia) Lesley Hunt	2–6, 6–7^{(4–5)}
Loss	11–7	Apr 1973	Tucson, US	Hard	(Australia) Karen Krantzcke	(United States) Janet Newberry (United States) Pam Teeguarden	6–3, 6–7, 5–7
Loss	11–8	Apr 1973	Philadelphia, US	Carpet (i)	(France) Françoise Dürr	(Australia) Margaret Court (Australia) Lesley Hunt	1–6, 6–3, 2–6
Loss	11–9	Apr 1973	Boston, US	Carpet (i)	(France) Françoise Dürr	(United States) Rosie Casals (United States) Billie Jean King	4–6, 2–6
Loss	11–10	Apr 1973	Jacksonville, US	Clay	(France) Françoise Dürr	(United States) Rosie Casals (United States) Billie Jean King	6–7, 7–5, 3–6
Win	12–10	May 1973	Hilton Head Island, US	Clay	(France) Françoise Dürr	(United States) Rosie Casals (United States) Billie Jean King	3–6, 6–4, 6–3
Loss	12–11	Jun 1973	French Open	Clay	(France) Françoise Dürr	(Australia) Margaret Court (United Kingdom) Virginia Wade	2–6, 3–6
Loss	12–12	Jun 1973	Nottingham, UK	Grass	(United States) Chris Evert	(United States) Rosie Casals (United States) Billie Jean King	2–6, 7–9
Loss	12–13	Jun 1973	London, UK	Grass	(France) Françoise Dürr	(United States) Rosie Casals (United States) Billie Jean King	6–4, 3–6, 5–7
Loss	12–14	Jul 1973	Wimbledon	Grass	(France) Françoise Dürr	(United States) Rosie Casals (United States) Billie Jean King	1–6, 6–4, 5–7
Win	13–14	Jul 1973	Hilversum, Netherlands	Clay	(West Germany) Helga Masthoff	(Netherlands) Trudy Walhof (South Africa) Brigitte Cuypers	6–2, 7–6
Win	14–14	Aug 1973	Nashville, US		(France) Françoise Dürr	(Australia) Karen Krantzcke (United States) Janet Newberry	6–4, 6–7, 6–1
Win	15–14	Aug 1973	Jersey Shore, US		(France) Françoise Dürr	(Australia) Julie Anthony (United States) Mona Schallau	6–4, 6–4
Win	16–14	Aug 1973	Newport, US	Grass	(France) Françoise Dürr	(United States) Janet Newberry (United States) Pam Teeguarden	6–4, 6–3
Loss	16–15	Sep 1973	St. Louis, US	Hard	(United States) Pam Teeguarden	(Australia) Karen Krantzcke (United States) Mona Schallau	4–6, 6–7
Loss	16–16	Sep 1973	Houston, US	Carpet (i)	(France) Françoise Dürr	(United States) Mona Schallau (United States) Pam Teeguarden	3–6, 7–5, 4–6
Win	17–16	Sep 1973	Columbus, US	Clay	(France) Françoise Dürr	(United States) Mona Schallau (United States) Pam Teeguarden	7–5, 7–5
Loss	17–17	Oct 1973	Boca Raton, US	Clay	(France) Françoise Dürr	(United States) Rosemary Casals (Australia) Margaret Court	2–6, 4–6
Loss	17–18	Jan 1974	San Francisco, US	Carpet (i)	(France) Françoise Dürr	(United States) Chris Evert (United States) Billie Jean King	4–6, 2–6
Win	18–18	Feb 1974	Washington D.C., US	Carpet (i)	(United States) Billie Jean King	(France) Françoise Dürr (Australia) Kerry Harris	6–3, 6–4
Win	19–18	Feb 1974	Fort Lauderdale, US	Clay	(France) Françoise Dürr	(United States) Patti Hogan (United States) Sharon Walsh	6–3, 6–2
Loss	19–19	Feb 1974	Detroit, US	Carpet (i)	(France) Françoise Dürr	(United States) Rosemary Casals (United States) Billie Jean King	6–2, 4–6, 5–7
Loss	19–20	Mar 1974	Chicago, US	Carpet (i)	(France) Françoise Dürr	(United States) Chris Evert (United States) Billie Jean King	6–3, 4–6, 4–6
Win	20–20	Apr 1974	St. Petersburg, US	Hard	(Soviet Union) Olga Morozova	(United States) Chris Evert (Australia) Evonne Goolagong	6–4, 6–2
Loss	0–0	Sep 1974	US Open	Clay	(France) Françoise Dürr	(United States) Rosie Casals (United States) Billie Jean King	6–7, 7–6, 4–6
Win	21–20	Sep 1974	Orlando, US	Clay	(France) Françoise Dürr	(United States) Rosie Casals (United States) Billie Jean King	6–3, 6–7^{(2–5)}, 6–4
Win	22–20	Sep 1974	Denver, US	Hard (i)	(France) Françoise Dürr	(United States) Mona Schallau (United States) Pam Teeguarden	6–2, 7–5
Win	23–20	Oct 1974	Phoenix, US	Hard	(France) Françoise Dürr	(United States) Mona Schallau (United States) Pam Teeguarden	6–3, 5–7, 6–3
Loss	0–0	Oct 1974	Los Angeles, US	Carpet (i)	(France) Françoise Dürr	(United States) Rosemary Casals (United States) Billie Jean King	1–6, 7–6^{(7–2)}, 5–7
Loss	23–21	Jan 1975	Sarasota, US	Carpet (i)	(United Kingdom) Virginia Wade	(United States) Chris Evert (United States) Billie Jean King	4–6, 2–6
Win	24–21	Feb 1975	Washington, US	Carpet (i)	(France) Françoise Dürr	(Australia) Helen Gourlay (Australia) Kerry Melville	6–3, 6–4
Win	25–21	Feb 1975	Akron, US	Carpet (i)	(France) Françoise Dürr	(United States) Chris Evert (Czechoslovakia) Martina Navratilova	7–5, 7–6
Loss	25–22	Feb 1975	Detroit, US	Carpet (i)	(France) Françoise Dürr	(Australia) Lesley Hunt (Czechoslovakia) Martina Navratilova	6–2, 5–7, 2–6
Win	26–22	Mar 1975	Houston, US	Carpet (i)	(France) Françoise Dürr	(Australia) Evonne Goolagong (United Kingdom) Virginia Wade	2–6, 6–3, 7–6^{(5–2)}
Win	27–22	Mar 1975	Dallas, US	Carpet (i)	(France) Françoise Dürr	(United States) Julie Anthony (United States) Mona Schallau	7–6^{(5–4)}, 6–2
Win	28–22	Apr 1975	Philadelphia, US	Carpet (i)	(Australia) Evonne Goolagong	(United States) Rosie Casals (United States) Billie Jean King	4–6, 6–4, 7–6
Loss	28–23	Jul 1975	Wimbledon	Grass	(France) Françoise Dürr	(United States) Ann Kiyomura (Japan) Kazuko Sawamatsu	5–7, 6–1, 5–7
Loss	28–24	Sep 1975	Atlanta, US	Carpet (i)	(France) Françoise Dürr	(United States) Chris Evert (Czechoslovakia) Martina Navratilova	4–6, 7–5, 2–6
Win	29–24	Sep 1975	Denver, US	Carpet (i)	(France) Françoise Dürr	(United States) Rosemary Casals (Czechoslovakia) Martina Navratilova	3–6, 6–1, 7–6
Win	30–24	Oct 1975	Phoenix, US	Hard	(France) Françoise Dürr	(United States) Rosemary Casals (Czechoslovakia) Martina Navratilova	6–7, 6–4, 6–0
Win	31–24	Nov 1975	Stockholm, Sweden	Carpet (i)	(France) Françoise Dürr	(Australia) Evonne Goolagong (United Kingdom) Virginia Wade	6–3, 6–4
Win	32–24	Nov 1975	Paris, France	Carpet (i)	(France) Françoise Dürr	(Australia) Evonne Goolagong (United Kingdom) Virginia Wade	2–6, 6–0, 6–3
Win	33–24	Nov 1975	Edinburgh/London, UK	Carpet (i)	(France) Françoise Dürr	(Australia) Evonne Goolagong (United Kingdom) Virginia Wade	6–4, 7–6
Loss	33–25	Feb 1976	Detroit, US	Carpet (i)	(United States) Karen Krantzcke	(United States) Mona Guerrant (United States) Ann Kiyomura	6–3, 6–4
Win	34–25	Feb 1976	Sarasota, Florida, US	Carpet (i)	(United States) Martina Navratilova	(United States) Mona Guerrant (United States) Ann Kiyomura	6–1, 6–0
Win	35–25	Mar 1976	San Francisco, US	Carpet (i)	(United States) Billie Jean King	(United States) Rosemary Casals (France) Françoise Dürr	6–4, 6–1
Win	36–25	Apr 1976	Philadelphia, US	Carpet (i)	(United States) Billie Jean King	(United States) Rosemary Casals (France) Françoise Dürr	6–3, 7–6^{(5–3)}
Win	37–25	Apr 1976	Osaka/Tokyo, Japan	Carpet (i)	(United States) Billie Jean King	(United States) Mona Guerrant (United States) Ann Kiyomura	6–3, 6–2
Loss	37–26	Jul 1976	Wimbledon	Grass	(United States) Billie Jean King	(United States) Chris Evert (United States) Martina Navratilova	1–6, 6–3, 5–7
Loss	37–27	Sep 1976	Atlanta, US	Carpet (i)	(United Kingdom) Virginia Wade	(United States) Rosie Casals (France) Françoise Dürr	0–6, 4–6
Win	38–27	Oct 1976	Phoenix, US	Hard	(United States) Billie Jean King	(South Africa) Linky Boshoff (South Africa) Ilana Kloss	6–2, 6–1
Loss	38–28	Oct 1976	Palm Springs, US	Hard	(United States) Billie Jean King	(United States) Chris Evert (United States) Martina Navratilova	2–6, 4–6
Win	39–28	Nov 1976	London, UK	Carpet (i)	(United Kingdom) Virginia Wade	(United States) Rosie Casals (United States) Chris Evert	6–3, 2–6, 6–3
Win	40–28	Dec 1976	Sydney, Australia	Grass	(United States) Martina Navratilova	(France) Françoise Dürr (United States) Ann Kiyomura	6–3, 7–5
Win	41–28	Dec 1976	Melbourne, Australia	Grass	(Australia) Margaret Court	(South Africa) Linky Boshoff (South Africa) Ilana Kloss	6–2, 6–4
Win	42–28	Feb 1977	Washington D.C., US	Carpet (i)	(United States) Martina Navratilova	(United States) Kristien Kemmer-Shaw (United States) Valerie Ziegenfuss	7–5, 6–2
Win	43–28	Jan 1977	Hollywood, US	Carpet (i)	(United States) Martina Navratilova	(United States) Rosemary Casals (United States) Chris Evert	6–4, 3–6, 6–4
Win	44–28	Jan 1977	Houston, US	Carpet (i)	(United States) Martina Navratilova	(United Kingdom) Sue Barker (United States) Ann Kiyomura	4–6, 6–2, 6–4
Loss	44–29	Feb 1977	Chicago, US	Carpet (i)	(Australia) Margaret Court	(United States) Rosemary Casals (United States) Chris Evert	3–6, 4–6
Loss	44–30	Feb 1977	Los Angeles, US	Carpet (i)	(United States) Martina Navratilova	(United States) Rosemary Casals (United States) Chris Evert	2–6, 4–6
Win	45–30	Feb 1977	Detroit, US	Carpet (i)	(United States) Martina Navratilova	(United States) Janet Newberry (United States) JoAnne Russell	6–3, 6–4
Win	46–30	Mar 1977	Dallas, US	Carpet (i)	(United States) Martina Navratilova	(Australia) Kerry Reid (South Africa) Greer Stevens	6–2, 6–4
Loss	46–31	Mar 1977	Philadelphia, US	Carpet (i)	(United States) Martina Navratilova	(France) Françoise Dürr (United Kingdom) Virginia Wade	4–6, 6–4, 4–6
Win	47–31	Apr 1977	Osaka/Tokyo, Japan	Carpet (i)	(United States) Martina Navratilova	(France) Françoise Dürr (United Kingdom) Virginia Wade	7–5, 6–3
Loss	47–32	Jul 1977	Wimbledon	Grass	(United States) Martina Navratilova	(Australia) Helen Gourlay Cawley (United States) JoAnne Russell	3–6, 3–6
Win	48–32	Aug 1977	Charlotte, US	Clay	(United States) Martina Navratilova	(Czechoslovakia) Regina Maršíková (United States) Pam Teeguarden	6–3, 6–4
Win	49–32	Sep 1977	US Open	Clay	(United States) Martina Navratilova	(United States) Renée Richards (United States) Betty-Ann Stuart	6–1, 7–6
Win	50–32	Oct 1977	Atlanta, US	Carpet (i)	(United States) Martina Navratilova	(South Africa) Brigitte Cuypers (South Africa) Marise Kruger	6–4, 6–2
Loss	50–33	Oct 1977	São Paulo, Brazil	Hard	(United States) Martina Navratilova	(Australia) Kerry Reid (Australia) Wendy Turnbull	3–6, 7–5, 2–6
Win	51–33	Nov 1977	Melbourne, Australia	Grass	(Australia) Evonne Goolagong	(United States) Patricia Bostrom (Australia) Kym Ruddell	6–3, 6–0
Loss	51–34	Jan 1978	Washington, US	Carpet (i)	(Australia) Wendy Turnbull	(United States) Billie Jean King (United States) Martina Navratilova	3–6, 5–7
Win	52–34	Feb 1978	Los Angeles, US	Carpet( i)	(United Kingdom) Virginia Wade	(United States) Pam Teeguarden (South Africa) Greer Stevens	6–3, 6–2
Win	53–34	Feb 1978	Chicago, US	Carpet(i)	(Australia) Evonne Goolagong	(United States) Rosie Casals (Australia) JoAnne Russell	6–1, 6–4
Loss	53–35	Mar 1978	Dallas, US	Carpet (i)	(Australia) Evonne Goolagong Cawley	(United States) Martina Navratilova (United States) Anne Smith	3–6, 6–7^{(2–5)}
Loss	53–36	Mar 1978	Boston, US	Carpet (i)	(Australia) Evonne Goolagong Cawley	(United States) Billie Jean King (Czechoslovakia) Martina Navratilova	3–6, 2–6
Win	54–36	Jun 1978	Eastbourne	Grass	(United States) Chris Evert	(United States) Billie Jean King (United States) Martina Navratilova	6–4, 6–7, 7–5
Win	55–36	Oct 1978	Phoenix, US	Hard	(United States) Tracy Austin	(United States) Martina Navratilova (United States) Anne Smith	6–4, 6–7, 6–2
Win	56–36	Oct 1978	Brighton, UK	Carpet (i)	(United Kingdom) Virginia Wade	(Socialist Federal Republic of Yugoslavia) Mima Jaušovec (United States) JoAnne Russell	6–0, 7–6
Win	57–36	Oct 1978	Filderstadt, West Germany	Carpet (i)	(United States) Tracy Austin	(South Africa) Ilana Kloss (Romania) Virginia Ruzici	6–3, 6–2
Win	58–36	Nov 1978	Kobe/Tokyo, Japan	Hard (i)	(United States) Martina Navratilova	(United States) Tracy Austin (United States) Kathy May	4–6, 7–6, 6–3
Loss	58–37	Jan 1979	Oakland, US	Carpet (i)	(United States) Tracy Austin	(United States) Rosie Casals (United States) Chris Evert	6–3, 4–6, 3–6
Loss	58–38	Jan 1979	Houston, US	Carpet (i)	(United States) Pam Shriver	(United States) Martina Navratilova (United States) Janet Newberry	6–4, 4–6, 2–6
Win	59–38	Jan 1979	Hollywood, US	Carpet (i)	(United States) Tracy Austin	(United States) Rosie Casals (Australia) Wendy Turnbull	6–2, 2–6, 6–2
Win	60–38	Feb 1979	Seattle, US	Carpet (i)	(France) Françoise Dürr	(United Kingdom) Sue Barker (United States) Ann Kiyomura	7–6^{(7–4)}, 4–6, 6–4
Win	61–38	Feb 1979	Detroit, US	Carpet (i)	(Australia) Wendy Turnbull	(United Kingdom) Sue Barker (United States) Ann Kiyomura	6–4, 7–6^{(7–5)}
Win	62–38	Mar 1979	Philadelphia, US	Carpet (i)	(France) Françoise Dürr	(United States) Renée Richards (United Kingdom) Virginia Wade	6–4, 6–2
Win	63–38	Mar 1979	New York, US	Carpet (i)	(France) Françoise Dürr	(United Kingdom) Sue Barker (United States) Ann Kiyomura	7–6^{(7–1)}, 7–6^{(7–3)}
Win	64–38	Apr 1979	Tokyo, Japan	Carpet (i)	(France) Françoise Dürr	(United Kingdom) Sue Barker (United States) Ann Kiyomura	7–5, 7–6^{(9–7)}
Loss	64–39	Apr 1979	Hilton Head Island, US	Clay	(France) Françoise Dürr	(United States) Rosie Casals (United States) Martina Navratilova	4–6, 5–7
Win	65–39	May 1979	Rome, Italy	Clay	(Australia) Wendy Turnbull	(Australia) Evonne Goolagong (Australia) Kerry Melville Reid	6–3, 6–4
Win	66–39	May 1979	French Open	Clay	(Australia) Wendy Turnbull	(France) Françoise Dürr (United Kingdom) Virginia Wade	2–6, 7–5, 6–4
Win	67–39	Jun 1979	Eastbourne, UK	Grass	(Australia) Wendy Turnbull	(South Africa) Ilana Kloss (United States) Betty Ann Stuart	6–2, 6–2
Loss	67–40	Jun 1979	Wimbledon	Grass	(Australia) Wendy Turnbull	(United States) Billie Jean King (United States) Martina Navratilova	7–5, 3–6, 2–6
Win	68–40	Aug 1979	Richmond, US	Carpet (i)	(Australia) Wendy Turnbull	(United States) Billie Jean King (United States) Martina Navratilova	6–1, 6–4
Win	69–40	Aug 1979	Mahwah, US	Hard	(United States) Tracy Austin	(Socialist Federal Republic of Yugoslavia) Mima Jaušovec (Czechoslovakia) Regina Maršíková	7–6, 2–6, 6–4
Win	70–40	Aug 1979	US Open	Hard	(Australia) Wendy Turnbull	(United States) Billie Jean King (United States) Martina Navratilova	7–5, 6–3
Win	71–40	Sep 1979	Atlanta, US	Carpet (i)	(Australia) Wendy Turnbull	(United States) Ann Kiyomura (United States) Anne Smith	6–2, 6–4
Loss	71–41	Oct 1979	Minneapolis, US	Carpet (i)	(Australia) Wendy Turnbull	(United States) Billie Jean King (United States) Martina Navratilova	4–6, 6–7
Win	72–41	Oct 1979	Phoenix, US	Hard	(Australia) Wendy Turnbull	(United States) Rosie Casals (United States) Chris Evert-Lloyd	6–4, 7–6
Win	73–41	Oct 1979	Stockholm, Sweden	Carpet (i)	(Australia) Wendy Turnbull	(United States) Billie Jean King (South Africa) Ilana Kloss	7–5, 7–6
Loss	73–42	Nov 1979	Filderstadt, West Germany	Carpet (i)	(Australia) Wendy Turnbull	(United States) Billie Jean King (United States) Martina Navratilova	3–6, 3–6
Loss	73–43	Feb 1980	Houston, US	Carpet (i)	(Australia) Wendy Turnbull	(United States) Billie Jean King (South Africa) Ilana Kloss	6–3, 1–6, 4–6
Win	74–43	Jun 1980	Chichester, UK	Grass	(United States) Pam Shriver	(United States) Rosemary Casals (Australia) Wendy Turnbull	6–4, 7–5
Loss	74–44	Jun 1980	Eastbourne, UK	Grass	(United States) Pam Shriver	(United States) Kathy Jordan (United States) Anne Smith	4–6, 1–6
Loss	74–45	Aug 1980	Mahwah, US	Hard	(United States) Pam Shriver	(United States) Martina Navratilova (United States) Candy Reynolds	6–4, 3–6, 1–6
Loss	74–46	Sep 1980	US Open	Hard	(United States) Pam Shriver	(United States) Billie Jean King (United States) Martina Navratilova	6–7^{(2–7)}, 5–7
Loss	74–47	Sep 1980	Las Vegas, US	Hard	(United States) Martina Navratilova	(United States) Kathy Jordan (United States) Anne Smith	6–2, 4–6, 3–6
Loss	74–48	Oct 1980	Brighton, UK	Carpet (i)	(United States) Martina Navratilova	(United States) Kathy Jordan (United States) Anne Smith	3–6, 5–7
Loss	74–49	Oct 1980	Stockholm, Sweden	Carpet (i)	(Czechoslovakia) Hana Mandlíková	(Socialist Federal Republic of Yugoslavia) Mima Jaušovec (Romania) Virginia Ruzici	2–6, 1–6
Win	75–49	Nov 1980	Filderstadt, West Germany	Carpet (i)	(Czechoslovakia) Hana Mandlíková	(United States) Kathy Jordan (United States) Anne Smith	6–4, 7–5
Win	76–49	Nov 1980	Amsterdam, Netherlands	Carpet (i)	(Czechoslovakia) Hana Mandlíková	(Socialist Federal Republic of Yugoslavia) Mima Jaušovec (United States) JoAnne Russell	7–6, 7–6
Win	77–49	Dec 1980	Sydney, Australia	Grass	(United States) Pam Shriver	(United States) Rosemary Casals (Australia) Wendy Turnbull	6–1, 4–6, 6–4
Win	78–49	Dec 1980	Adelaide, Australia	Grass	(United States) Pam Shriver	(United Kingdom) Sue Barker (United States) Sharon Walsh	6–4, 6–3
Loss	78–50	Feb 1981	Detroit, US	Carpet (i)	(Czechoslovakia) Hana Mandlíková	(United States) Rosie Casals (Australia) Wendy Turnbull	4–6, 2–6
Loss	78–51	Aug 1981	Mahwah, US	Hard	(United States) Candy Reynolds	(United States) Rosie Casals (Australia) Wendy Turnbull	2–6, 1–6
Loss	78–52	Mar 1983	Palm Springs, US	Hard	(Australia) Dianne Fromholtz	(United States) Kathy Jordan (United States) Ann Kiyomura	2–6, 2–6

== See also ==
- Performance timelines for all female tennis players since 1978 who reached at least one Grand Slam final

Awards
Preceded by Keetie van Oosten	Dutch Sportswoman of the Year; 1977	Succeeded by Keetie van Oosten
