= Winnie Shaw =

British tennis player (1947–1992)

- Full name: Winifred Mason Shaw
- Country (sports): United Kingdom
- Born: 18 January 1947 Glasgow, Scotland
- Died: 30 March 1992 (aged 45) Woking, England
- Turned pro: 1963 (ILTF)
- Retired: 1978
- Plays: Right-handed

Singles
- Career record: 445–219
- Career titles: 28

Grand Slam singles results
- Australian Open: SF (1970, 1971)
- French Open: 3R (1971)
- Wimbledon: QF (1970, 1971)
- US Open: 3R (1969)

Grand Slam doubles results
- Australian Open: SF (1970, 1971)
- French Open: F (1972)
- Wimbledon: SF (1972)
- US Open: SF (1966, 1967)

Grand Slam mixed doubles results
- French Open: F (1971)
- Wimbledon: 4R (1969, 1971, 1973, 1974)
- US Open: QF (1967)

Team competitions
- Wightman Cup: W (1968)

Winifred Mason Shaw (later Mrs. Wooldridge) (18 January 1947 – 30 March 1992) was a professional tennis player from Scotland whose career ran from the mid-1960s until the late 70s. In 2002, she was posthumously inducted into the Scottish Sports Hall of Fame. She was active from 1963 to 1978 and contested 56 career singles finals winning 28 titles.

== Personal life ==
Winnie Shaw was born in Glasgow on 18 January 1947, the second and youngest child of Winifred Mason, also a tennis player who was Scottish national champion in 1930 and 1933, and journalist Angus Shaw.

== Career ==
Shaw was a three-time winner of the Scottish Grass Court Championships in 1965, 1966 and 1970, three-time runner-up in the Scottish Hard Court Championships and twice runner-up in the British Hard Court Championships. At the 1970 Queen's Club Championships Shaw became the last British woman to reach the singles final at Queens until 2026. She was within three points of winning the final against Margaret Court (Court was down 2–6, 0–5 and 0–15), but lost. Shaw did, however, win the Mixed Doubles with Owen Davidson.

In Grand Slam events, Shaw's best progress was reaching the Australian Open semifinals in 1970 and 1971, and the Wimbledon quarterfinals in the same seasons.

In doubles events, Shaw reached the finals of both the mixed doubles (1971) and the ladies doubles (1972) at the French Open. She also made it to the ladies doubles semifinals at the US Open and Australian Open on two occasions each, and to the semifinal at Wimbledon in 1972, playing with another player from Scotland, Joyce Williams.

She represented Great Britain in the Wightman Cup and the Federation Cup teams between 1966 and 1972.

== Golf ==
After her marriage in 1972 she became a keen golfer. She played for Scotland in the 1982 Women's Home Internationals. Shaw reached the semi-finals of the Scottish Women's Amateur Championship in 1980 and 1982. In 1981, partnered by Belle Robertson, she won the Avia Foursomes with a score of 309, a stroke ahead of the runners-up.

== Retirement ==
She married English tennis player Keith Wooldridge in October 1972 and retired as a tennis player after the 1978 edition of Wimbledon. She died on 30 March 1992 from a brain tumour.

== Grand Slam finals ==
=== Doubles (1 runner-up) ===
Result	Year	Championship	Surface	Partner	Opponents	Score
Loss	1972	French Open	Clay	(United Kingdom) Nell Truman	(United States) Billie Jean King (Netherlands) Betty Stöve	1–6, 2–6

=== Mixed doubles (1 runner-up) ===
Result	Year	Championship	Surface	Partner	Opponents	Score
Loss	1971	French Open	Clay	(Soviet Union) Toomas Leius	(France) Françoise Dürr (France) Jean-Claude Barclay	2–6, 4–6
