= Nell Truman =

British tennis player

- Full name: Frances Ellen Truman Robinson
- Country (sports): United Kingdom
- Born: 12 December 1945 Loughton, England
- Died: 8 April 2012 (aged 66) Cambridge, England
- Retired: 1972
- Plays: Right–handed

Singles
- Career record: 9–13

Grand Slam singles results
- French Open: 1R (1972)
- Wimbledon: 4R (1969)
- US Open: 2R (1970, 1971)

Doubles
- Career record: 11–8

Grand Slam doubles results
- French Open: F (1972)
- Wimbledon: QF (1965, 1969, 1970)

Grand Slam mixed doubles results
- Wimbledon: QF (1970)

Team competitions
- Wightman Cup: W (1968)
Medal record
Representing Great Britain
Women's Tennis
Summer Universiade
Gold medal – first place	1967 Tokyo	Women's Singles
Bronze medal – third place	1967 Tokyo	Women's Doubles

Frances Ellen 'Nell' Truman Robinson (12 December 1945 – 8 April 2012), was a female tennis player from the United Kingdom active in the 1960s and early 1970s. She was mainly known for her performance as a doubles player.

== Career ==
Nell Truman was born on 12 December 1945 in Loughton, England, the youngest child of Stanley, a chartered accountant, and Aimee Truman, as well as the sister of tennis player Christine Truman. She attended Queen Anne's School in Caversham, Berkshire, and went on to read geography at St Anne's College, Oxford, where she was awarded blues in tennis and squash. She won a gold medal in the singles event at the 1967 World Student Games in Tokyo.

Her best performance at a Grand Slam tournament was reaching the final of the doubles event at the 1972 French Open. Partnering compatriot Winnie Shaw, they lost the final in straight sets to Billie Jean King and Betty Stöve. Her best Grand Slam singles performance was reaching the fourth round of the 1969 Wimbledon Championships, in which she lost to Judy Tegart.

Between 1965 and 1972, Truman played in five Wightman Cups, a team tennis competition for women between the United States and Great Britain. During the 1968 Wightman Cup, the match was tied at three all, and Nell partnered with her sister Christine in the deciding rubber. The sisters won the match, and Nell hit the winning shot to give the British team victory, their first triumph over the U.S. team since 1960.

In February 1968, she won the singles title at the French Covered Courts Championships in Paris. At the Alexandria Championships in Egypt, played in March 1968, she defeated Olga Morozova in the final to win the singles title.

In April 1968, she and her sister became the first winners of an open tennis event by winning the women's doubles title at the British Hard Court Championships in Bournemouth. In February 1971, she won the singles title at the German Indoor Tennis Championships in Bremen, defeating Heide Orth in the final in straight sets. In 1972, she joined the Virginia Slims tennis circuit.

She married Christopher Robinson, a London solicitor, on 7 October 1972 with whom she had a son and three daughters. Nell Truman died in Cambridge on 8 April 2012 as a result of a stroke.

== Grand Slam finals ==
=== Doubles (1 runner-up) ===
Result	Year	Championship	Surface	Partner	Opponents	Score
Loss	1972	French Open	Clay	(United Kingdom) Winnie Shaw	(United States) Billie Jean King (Netherlands) Betty Stöve	1–6, 2–6
