= 1971 ILTF Women's Tennis Circuit =

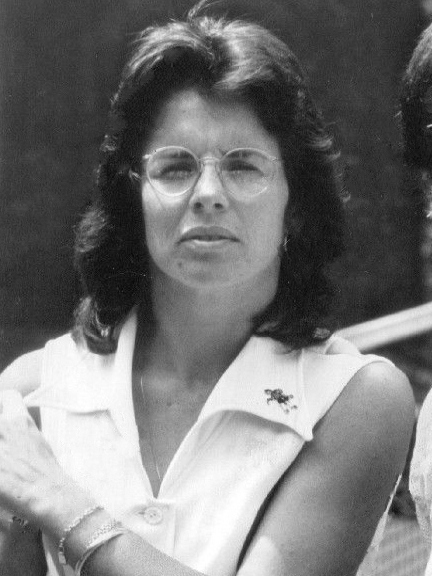
- Billie Jean King (pictured in 1973) won 17 tour titles.

Details
- Duration: 22 December 1970 – 20 December 1971
- Edition: 58th
- Tournaments: 165
- Categories: Grand Slam (4); Virginia Slims Circuit (19); ILTF Pepsi Grand Prix (17) (Note: Including three Grand Slam events.); ILTF World Circuit (125)

Achievements (singles)
- Most titles: (United States) Billie Jean King (17)
- Most finals: (United States) Billie Jean King (25)

The 1971 ILTF Women's Tennis Circuit was the 58th season since the formation of the International Lawn Tennis Federation in 1913, it consisted of a number of tennis tournaments for female tennis players.

It was composed of three circuits the first Virginia Slims Circuit with 19 events approved by the ILTF, and the first Grand Prix Circuit with 17 events under the auspices of the ILTF and the regular ILTF World Circuit, with 125 events makes up the majority of the 165 tournaments staged this year.

== Circuits ==
=== ILTF Women's Grand Prix ===
The 1971 ILTF Pepsi-Cola Women's Grand Prix was a tennis circuit administered by the International Lawn Tennis Federation. The circuit consisted of the four modern Grand Slam tournaments and open tournaments recognised by the ILTF. This article covers all tournaments that were part of that year's Women's Grand Prix.

=== Virginia Slims Circuit ===
Prior to the establishment of this circuit there was an inequality between the prize money purses for male and female tennis players which gave rise to complaints from a number of the leading female tennis players of the time. Nine of them, including Billie Jean King, became later known as the "Original 9" after being banned from the then existing multi-gender invitational professional events run by the influential United States Lawn Tennis Association (USLTA) due to their boycotting of the Pacific Southwest Championships. This resulted in the first Virginia Slims-sponsored event being held in September 1970 in Houston, an event which laid the groundwork for the establishment of the annual Virginia Slims Circuit the following year. In 1971 the total prize money available from the Virginia Slims events was $309,100 and Billie Jean King became the first female athlete in history to earn more than $100,000 in one season.

=== ILTF World Circuit ===
The worldwide ILTF World Circuit consisted of 125 events that were not part of the sponsored Virginia Slims and Grand Prix circuits they made up the majority of the 165 tournaments staged this year. This years singles title leader Billie Jean King won her 17 tournaments across all three circuits.

First tournament began on 30 December 1970 with the Western Australian Open in Perth, Australia and ended on 25 December with the Border Championships, East London, South Africa.

== Schedule ==
This is a calendar of all events sponsored by Virginia Slims in the year 1971, with player progression documented from the quarterfinals stage. The table also includes the Grand Slam tournaments and the 1971 Federation Cup.

Key

Grand Slam tournaments
Virginia Slims Circuit
ILTF Pepsi Grand Prix Circuit
ILTF World Circuit
Team events

=== December (1970) ===
Week	Tournament	Champions	Runners-up	Semifinalists	Quarterfinalists
29 Dec	Federation Cup; Perth, Australia; Federation Cup; Grass – 14 teams knockout	Australia; 3–0	Great Britain	France; United States	Yugoslavia; Netherlands; South Africa; New Zealand
29 Dec	Western Australian Open; Perth, Australia; Non-tour event	(Australia) Margaret Court; 6–1, 6–2	(United Kingdom) Virginia Wade	(France) Gail Chanfreau (Netherlands) Betty Stöve	(United Kingdom) Winnie Shaw (United States) Patti Hogan (South Africa) Laura Rossouw (Australia) Lesley Hunt
29 Dec	Western Australian Open; Perth, Australia; Non-tour event	(Australia) Margaret Court (Australia) Evonne Goolagong; 6–4, 7–5	(United Kingdom) Winnie Shaw (United Kingdom) Virginia Wade	(France) Gail Chanfreau (Netherlands) Betty Stöve	(United Kingdom) Winnie Shaw (United States) Patti Hogan (South Africa) Laura Rossouw (Australia) Lesley Hunt

=== January ===
Week	Tournament	Champions	Runners-up	Semifinalists	Quarterfinalists
4 Jan	British Motor Cars Invitational; San Francisco, United States; Virginia Slims; Hard – $15,200 – 16S/8D; Singles – Doubles	(United States) Billie Jean King; 6–3, 6–4	(United States) Rosie Casals	(United Kingdom) Ann Jones (3rd) (United States) Nancy Richey (4th)	(France) Françoise Dürr (Australia) Kerry Melville (United States) Jane Bartkowicz (United States) Mary-Ann Eisel
4 Jan	British Motor Cars Invitational; San Francisco, United States; Virginia Slims; Hard – $15,200 – 16S/8D; Singles – Doubles	(United States) Rosie Casals (United States) Billie Jean King; 6–4, 6–7, 6–1	(France) Françoise Dürr (United Kingdom) Ann Jones	(United Kingdom) Ann Jones (3rd) (United States) Nancy Richey (4th)	(France) Françoise Dürr (Australia) Kerry Melville (United States) Jane Bartkowicz (United States) Mary-Ann Eisel
4 Jan	New South Wales Open; Sydney; Non-tour event	(Australia) Margaret Court; 6–2, 6–2	(Soviet Union) Olga Morozova	(France) Gail Chanfreau (Japan) Kazuko Sawamatsu	(South Africa) Brenda Kirk (United States) Kristien Kemmer (Netherlands) Betty Stöve (United States) Patti Hogan
4 Jan	New South Wales Open; Sydney; Non-tour event	(Australia) Margaret Court (Soviet Union) Olga Morozova; 6–2, 6–0	(Australia) Helen Gourlay (Australia) Kerry Harris	(France) Gail Chanfreau (Japan) Kazuko Sawamatsu	(South Africa) Brenda Kirk (United States) Kristien Kemmer (Netherlands) Betty Stöve (United States) Patti Hogan
11 Jan	Billie Jean King Invitational; Long Beach, United States; Virginia Slims; Hard – $14,000 – 16S/8D; Singles – Doubles	(United States) Billie Jean King; 6–1, 6–2	(United States) Rosie Casals	(United Kingdom) Ann Jones (United States) Nancy Richey	(United States) Stephanie Johnson (United States) Valerie Ziegenfuss (United States) Denise Carter (United States) Mary-Ann Eisel
11 Jan	Billie Jean King Invitational; Long Beach, United States; Virginia Slims; Hard – $14,000 – 16S/8D; Singles – Doubles	(United States) Rosie Casals (United States) Billie Jean King; 7–5, 6–3	(France) Françoise Dürr (United Kingdom) Ann Jones	(United Kingdom) Ann Jones (United States) Nancy Richey	(United States) Stephanie Johnson (United States) Valerie Ziegenfuss (United States) Denise Carter (United States) Mary-Ann Eisel
18 Jan	Virginia Slims of Milwaukee; Milwaukee, United States; Virginia Slims; Hard (i) – $12,500 – 16S/8D; Singles – Doubles	(United States) Billie Jean King; 6–1, 6–2	(United States) Rosie Casals	(United Kingdom) Ann Jones (France) Françoise Dürr	(United States) Mary-Ann Eisel (Australia) Karen Krantzcke (United States) Valerie Ziegenfuss (United States) Denise Carter
18 Jan	Virginia Slims of Milwaukee; Milwaukee, United States; Virginia Slims; Hard (i) – $12,500 – 16S/8D; Singles – Doubles	(United States) Rosie Casals (United States) Billie Jean King; 6–3, 1–6, 6–2	(France) Françoise Dürr (United Kingdom) Ann Jones	(United Kingdom) Ann Jones (France) Françoise Dürr	(United States) Mary-Ann Eisel (Australia) Karen Krantzcke (United States) Valerie Ziegenfuss (United States) Denise Carter
25 Jan	Virginia Slims of Oklahoma City; Oklahoma City, United States; Virginia Slims; Hard – $12,500 – 16S/4D; Singles – Doubles	(United States) Billie Jean King; 1–6, 7–6, 6–4	(United States) Rosie Casals	(United Kingdom) Ann Jones (France) Françoise Dürr	(Australia) Kerry Melville (United States) Denise Carter (United States) Tory Fretz (United States) Mary-Ann Eisel
25 Jan	Virginia Slims of Oklahoma City; Oklahoma City, United States; Virginia Slims; Hard – $12,500 – 16S/4D; Singles – Doubles	(United States) Rosie Casals (United States) Billie Jean King; 6–7, 6–0, 7–5	(United States) Mary-Ann Eisel (United States) Valerie Ziegenfuss	(United Kingdom) Ann Jones (France) Françoise Dürr	(Australia) Kerry Melville (United States) Denise Carter (United States) Tory Fretz (United States) Mary-Ann Eisel
25 Jan	Victoria Championships; Melbourne, Australia; Non-tour event Singles	(Australia) Evonne Goolagong; 7–6, 7–6	(Australia) Margaret Court	(Japan) Kazuko Sawamatsu (United Kingdom) Winnie Shaw	(United States) Patti Hogan (Soviet Union) Olga Morozova (Netherlands) Trudy Walhof (France) Gail Chanfreau

=== February ===
Week	Tournament	Champions	Runners-up	Semifinalists	Quarterfinalists
1 Feb	Virginia Slims of Chattanooga; Chattanooga, United States; Virginia Slims; Hard (i) – $12,700 – 16S/8D	(United States) Billie Jean King; 6–4, 6–1	(United Kingdom) Ann Jones	(France) Françoise Dürr (Australia) Kerry Melville	(United States) Jane Bartkowicz (Australia) Karen Krantzcke (United States) Kristy Pigeon (United States) Rosie Casals
1 Feb	Virginia Slims of Chattanooga; Chattanooga, United States; Virginia Slims; Hard (i) – $12,700 – 16S/8D	(United States) Rosie Casals (United States) Billie Jean King; 6–4, 7–5	(France) Françoise Dürr (United Kingdom) Ann Jones	(France) Françoise Dürr (Australia) Kerry Melville	(United States) Jane Bartkowicz (Australia) Karen Krantzcke (United States) Kristy Pigeon (United States) Rosie Casals
1 Feb	BP New Zealand Championships; Christchurch, New Zealand; Non-tour event	(Australia) Evonne Goolagong; 6–1, 6–4	(Netherlands) Betty Stöve	(United States) Kathleen Harter (France) Gail Chanfreau	(South Africa) Laura Rossouw (Netherlands) Trudy Walhof (United States) Patty Ann Reese (United Kingdom) Winnie Shaw
1 Feb	BP New Zealand Championships; Christchurch, New Zealand; Non-tour event	(United States) Kathleen Harter (United Kingdom) Winnie Shaw; 6–4, 4–6, 7–5	(France) Gail Chanfreau (Australia) Evonne Goolagong	(United States) Kathleen Harter (France) Gail Chanfreau	(South Africa) Laura Rossouw (Netherlands) Trudy Walhof (United States) Patty Ann Reese (United Kingdom) Winnie Shaw
8 Feb	Philadelphia Indoor Championships; Philadelphia, United States; Virginia Slims; Hard (i) – $12,500 – 16S	(United States) Rosie Casals; 6–2, 3–6, 6–2	(France) Françoise Dürr	(United States) Billie Jean King (United Kingdom) Ann Jones	(United States) Tory Fretz (United States) Denise Carter (Australia) Kerry Melville (Australia) Judy Tegart-Dalton
8 Feb	Philadelphia Indoor Championships; Philadelphia, United States; Virginia Slims; Hard (i) – $12,500 – 16S	(United States) Rosie Casals (United States) Billie Jean King		(United States) Billie Jean King (United Kingdom) Ann Jones	(United States) Tory Fretz (United States) Denise Carter (Australia) Kerry Melville (Australia) Judy Tegart-Dalton
15 Feb	Station WLOD; Fort Lauderdale, United States; Virginia Slims; Clay – $10,000 – 16S	(France) Françoise Dürr; 6–3, 3–6, 6–3	(United States) Billie Jean King	(Australia) Kerry Melville (United States) Rosie Casals	(Australia) Judy Dalton (United Kingdom) Ann Jones (United States) Denise Carter (United States) Valerie Ziegenfuss
15 Feb	USSR Championships; Moscow, Soviet Union; Non-tour event	(Soviet Union) Olga Morozova; 6–1, 7–5	(Soviet Union) Maria Kull	(Soviet Union) Yelena Granaturova (Soviet Union) Anna Yeremeyeva	(Soviet Union) Yekaterina Kryuchkova (Soviet Union) Marina Kroschina (Soviet Union) Eugenia Birioukova (Soviet Union) Rausa Islanova
15 Feb	USSR Championships; Moscow, Soviet Union; Non-tour event	(Soviet Union) Eugenia Birioukova (Soviet Union) Marina Kroschina; 7–6, 5–7, 7–5	(Soviet Union) Yelena Granaturova (Soviet Union) Olga Morozova	(Soviet Union) Yelena Granaturova (Soviet Union) Anna Yeremeyeva	(Soviet Union) Yekaterina Kryuchkova (Soviet Union) Marina Kroschina (Soviet Union) Eugenia Birioukova (Soviet Union) Rausa Islanova
22 Feb	Virginia Slims National Indoors; Winchester, United States; Virginia Slims; Hard (i) – $12,500 – 16S/2D	(United States) Billie Jean King; 4–6, 6–2, 6–3	(United States) Rosie Casals	(United Kingdom) Ann Jones (France) Françoise Dürr	(Australia) Judy Tegart-Dalton (United States) Jane Bartkowicz (United States) Kristy Pigeon (Australia) Kerry Melville
22 Feb	Virginia Slims National Indoors; Winchester, United States; Virginia Slims; Hard (i) – $12,500 – 16S/2D	(United States) Rosie Casals (United States) Billie Jean King; 6–4, 7–5	(France) Françoise Dürr (United Kingdom) Ann Jones	(United Kingdom) Ann Jones (France) Françoise Dürr	(Australia) Judy Tegart-Dalton (United States) Jane Bartkowicz (United States) Kristy Pigeon (Australia) Kerry Melville

=== March ===
Week	Tournament	Champions	Runners-up	Semifinalists	Quarterfinalists
1 Mar	Benson & Hedges Centennial Open; Auckland, New Zealand; Non-tour event	(Australia) Margaret Court; 3–6, 7–6^{(5–1)}, 6–2	(Australia) Evonne Goolagong	(United Kingdom) Winnie Shaw (United States) Patti Hogan	(United States) Sharon Walsh (Australia) Lesley Bowrey (Australia) Lesley Hunt (New Zealand) Marilyn Pryde
1 Mar	Benson & Hedges Centennial Open; Auckland, New Zealand; Non-tour event	(Australia) Margaret Court (Australia) Evonne Goolagong; 7–6, 6–0	(Australia) Lesley Bowrey (United Kingdom) Winnie Shaw	(United Kingdom) Winnie Shaw (United States) Patti Hogan	(United States) Sharon Walsh (Australia) Lesley Bowrey (Australia) Lesley Hunt (New Zealand) Marilyn Pryde
8 Mar	Dunlop Australian Open; Sydney, Australia; Grand Slam; Grass – 30S/14D; Singles – Doubles	(Australia) Margaret Court; 2–6, 7–6, 7–5	(Australia) Evonne Goolagong	(Australia) Lesley Hunt (United Kingdom) Winnie Shaw	(Australia) Helen Gourlay (Australia) Jan O'Neill (Australia) Norma Marsh (United States) Sharon Walsh
8 Mar	Dunlop Australian Open; Sydney, Australia; Grand Slam; Grass – 30S/14D; Singles – Doubles	(Australia) Margaret Court (Australia) Evonne Goolagong; 6–0, 6–0	(Australia) Jill Emmerson (Australia) Lesley Hunt	(Australia) Lesley Hunt (United Kingdom) Winnie Shaw	(Australia) Helen Gourlay (Australia) Jan O'Neill (Australia) Norma Marsh (United States) Sharon Walsh
15 Mar	Virginia Slims US Indoors; Detroit, United States; Virginia Slims; Hard (i) – $10,000 – 8S/2D	(United States) Billie Jean King; 3–6, 6–1, 6–2	(United States) Rosie Casals	(United Kingdom) Ann Jones (United States) Mary-Ann Eisel	(United States) Valerie Ziegenfuss (United States) Tory Fretz (Australia) Wendy Gilchrist (Australia) Judy Tegart-Dalton
15 Mar	Virginia Slims US Indoors; Detroit, United States; Virginia Slims; Hard (i) – $10,000 – 8S/2D	(United States) Mary-Ann Eisel (United States) Valerie Ziegenfuss; 2–6, 6–2, 6–3	(Australia) Judy Tegart-Dalton (United States) Jane Bartkowicz	(United Kingdom) Ann Jones (United States) Mary-Ann Eisel	(United States) Valerie Ziegenfuss (United States) Tory Fretz (Australia) Wendy Gilchrist (Australia) Judy Tegart-Dalton
22 Mar	Virginia Slims of New York; New York, United States; Virginia Slims; Hard (i) – $15,600 – 20S	(United States) Rosie Casals; 6–4, 6–4	(United States) Billie Jean King	3rd: (United Kingdom) Ann Jones; 4th: (France) Françoise Dürr	(United States) Julie Heldman (Australia) Kerry Melville (United States) Cecilia Martinez (United States) Jane Bartkowicz
29 Mar	Caribe Hilton Invitational; San Juan, Puerto Rico; Virginia Slims $10,000 – 24S/11D	(United Kingdom) Ann Jones; 6–4, 6–4	(United States) Nancy Richey	(United States) Mary-Ann Eisel (United States) Jane Bartkowicz	(United States) Denise Carter (United States) Tory Fretz (Australia) Judy Tegart-Dalton (United States) Rosie Casals
29 Mar	Caribe Hilton Invitational; San Juan, Puerto Rico; Virginia Slims $10,000 – 24S/11D	(France) Françoise Dürr (United Kingdom) Ann Jones; 7–6, 6–3	(Australia) Karen Krantzcke (Australia) Kerry Melville	(United States) Mary-Ann Eisel (United States) Jane Bartkowicz	(United States) Denise Carter (United States) Tory Fretz (Australia) Judy Tegart-Dalton (United States) Rosie Casals
29 Mar	Natal Open Championships; Durban, South Africa; Non-tour event	(Australia) Margaret Court; 6–2, 6–1	(United States) Patti Hogan	(United Kingdom) Virginia Wade (West Germany) Heide Schildeknecht	(Australia) Lesley Hunt (United Kingdom) Winnie Shaw (Australia) Evonne Goolagong (West Germany) Helga Niessen Masthoff
29 Mar	Natal Open Championships; Durban, South Africa; Non-tour event	(Australia) Margaret Court (Australia) Evonne Goolagong; 3–6, 6–3, 6–3	(Australia) Kerry Harris (United Kingdom) Winnie Shaw	(United Kingdom) Virginia Wade (West Germany) Heide Schildeknecht	(Australia) Lesley Hunt (United Kingdom) Winnie Shaw (Australia) Evonne Goolagong (West Germany) Helga Niessen Masthoff

=== April ===
Week	Tournament	Champions	Runners-up	Semifinalists	Quarterfinalists
5 Apr	Virginia Slims Masters; St. Petersburg, United States; Virginia Slims; Clay – $10,000 – 16S/11D	(United States) Chris Evert; 6–1, 6–2	(United States) Julie Heldman	(United States) Billie Jean King (United States) Rosie Casals	(Australia) Karen Krantzcke (United States) Judy Alvarez (Australia) Kerry Melville (Australia) Judy Tegart-Dalton
5 Apr	Virginia Slims Masters; St. Petersburg, United States; Virginia Slims; Clay – $10,000 – 16S/11D	(France) Françoise Dürr (United Kingdom) Ann Jones; 7–6, 3–6, 6–3	(Australia) Judy Tegart-Dalton (United States) Julie Heldman	(United States) Billie Jean King (United States) Rosie Casals	(Australia) Karen Krantzcke (United States) Judy Alvarez (Australia) Kerry Melville (Australia) Judy Tegart-Dalton
5 Apr	Monte Carlo Open Championships; Monte Carlo, Monaco; Non-tour event 16S/4D	(France) Gail Chanfreau; 6–4, 4–6, 6–4	(Netherlands) Betty Stöve	(Sweden) Christina Sandberg (France) Odile de Roubin	(Italy) Lucia Bassi (Czechoslovakia) Marie Neumannová (Hungary) Katalin Borka (Italy) Lea Pericoli
5 Apr	Monte Carlo Open Championships; Monte Carlo, Monaco; Non-tour event 16S/4D	(West Germany) Katja Ebbinghaus (Netherlands) Betty Stöve; 6–4, 6–3	(Italy) Lucia Bassi (Italy) Lea Pericoli	(Sweden) Christina Sandberg (France) Odile de Roubin	(Italy) Lucia Bassi (Czechoslovakia) Marie Neumannová (Hungary) Katalin Borka (Italy) Lea Pericoli
5 Apr	South Africa Open; Johannesburg, South Africa; Non-tour event 26S/8D	(Australia) Margaret Court; 6–3, 6–1	(Australia) Evonne Goolagong	(United Kingdom) Winnie Shaw (United Kingdom) Virginia Wade	(Australia) Kerry Harris (West Germany) Helga Niessen Masthoff (South Africa) Pat Walkden (United States) Patti Hogan
5 Apr	South Africa Open; Johannesburg, South Africa; Non-tour event 26S/8D	(Australia) Margaret Court (Australia) Evonne Goolagong; 6–3, 6–2	(South Africa) Brenda Kirk (South Africa) Laura Rossouw	(United Kingdom) Winnie Shaw (United Kingdom) Virginia Wade	(Australia) Kerry Harris (West Germany) Helga Niessen Masthoff (South Africa) Pat Walkden (United States) Patti Hogan
12 Apr	Caesar's Palace World Pro Championships; Las Vegas, United States; Virginia Slims; Hard – $29,200 – 16S/10D	(United Kingdom) Ann Jones; 7–5, 6–4	(United States) Billie Jean King	(United States) Julie Heldman (Australia) Judy Dalton	(United States) Nancy Richey (France) Françoise Dürr (United States) Mary-Ann Eisel (United States) Rosie Casals
12 Apr	Caesar's Palace World Pro Championships; Las Vegas, United States; Virginia Slims; Hard – $29,200 – 16S/10D	(France) Françoise Dürr (United Kingdom) Ann Jones; 0–6, 6–2, 6–4	(United States) Rosie Casals (United States) Billie Jean King	(United States) Julie Heldman (Australia) Judy Dalton	(United States) Nancy Richey (France) Françoise Dürr (United States) Mary-Ann Eisel (United States) Rosie Casals
12 Apr	USA National Bank Open; Charlotte, North Carolina, US; Non-tour event 6S/2D	(United States) Chris Evert; 6–2, 6–0	(United States) Laura duPont	(United States) Janet Newberry (United States) Eliza Pande	(United States) Sue Stap (United States) Beverly Cansler
12 Apr	USA National Bank Open; Charlotte, North Carolina, US; Non-tour event 6S/2D	(United States) Chris Evert (United States) Sue Stap; 6–3, 1–6, 6–3	(United States) Janet Newberry (United States) Eliza Pande	(United States) Janet Newberry (United States) Eliza Pande	(United States) Sue Stap (United States) Beverly Cansler
19 Apr	Virginia Slims of San Diego; San Diego, United States; Virginia Slims; Hard – $12,500 – 16S/4D	(United States) Billie Jean King; 4–6, 7–5, 6–1	(United States) Rosie Casals	(United States) Julie Heldman (United States) Valerie Ziegenfuss	(South Africa) Esmé Emmanuel (Australia) Kerry Melville (United States) Tory Fretz (United States) Kristy Pigeon
19 Apr	Virginia Slims of San Diego; San Diego, United States; Virginia Slims; Hard – $12,500 – 16S/4D	(United States) Rosie Casals (United States) Billie Jean King; 6–7, 6–2, 6–3	(France) Françoise Dürr (Australia) Judy Tegart-Dalton	(United States) Julie Heldman (United States) Valerie Ziegenfuss	(South Africa) Esmé Emmanuel (Australia) Kerry Melville (United States) Tory Fretz (United States) Kristy Pigeon
19 Apr	Catania Open Grand Prix; Catania, Italy; Non-tour event 15S/8D	(United Kingdom) Virginia Wade; 6–0, 6–3	(France) Gail Chanfreau	(West Germany) Helga Schultze (South Africa) Laura Rossouw	(Czechoslovakia) Marie Neumannová (South Africa) Brenda Kirk (Czechoslovakia) Miloslava Holubová (United States) Pam Teeguarden
19 Apr	Catania Open Grand Prix; Catania, Italy; Non-tour event 15S/8D	(United States) Pam Teeguarden (United Kingdom) Virginia Wade; 6–4, 6–4	(France) Gail Chanfreau (West Germany) Helga Schultze	(West Germany) Helga Schultze (South Africa) Laura Rossouw	(Czechoslovakia) Marie Neumannová (South Africa) Brenda Kirk (Czechoslovakia) Miloslava Holubová (United States) Pam Teeguarden
26 Apr	Rothmans Sutton Hard Courts; Sutton, United Kingdom; Non-tour even	(Australia) Evonne Goolagong; 7–5, 2–6, 6–3	(United Kingdom) Joyce Williams	(United Kingdom) Jill Cooper (United Kingdom) Shirley Brasher	(Australia) Barbara Hawcroft (United Kingdom) Nell Truman (Republic of Ireland) Susan Minford (United Kingdom) Sally Holdsworth
26 Apr	Rothmans Sutton Hard Courts; Sutton, United Kingdom; Non-tour even	(Australia) Evonne Goolagong (United Kingdom) Joyce Williams; 6–4, 6–3	(United States) Shirley Brasher (United States) Margaret Cooper	(United Kingdom) Jill Cooper (United Kingdom) Shirley Brasher	(Australia) Barbara Hawcroft (United Kingdom) Nell Truman (Republic of Ireland) Susan Minford (United Kingdom) Sally Holdsworth
26 Apr	River Plate Championships; Buenos Aires, Argentina; Non-tour event	(Soviet Union) Olga Morozova; 6–0, 6–3	(Italy) Anna-Maria Nasuelli	(Netherlands) Betty Stöve (Argentina) Beatriz Araujo	(Argentina) Marta Fernández Ruiz (Argentina) Raquel Giscafré (Argentina) Inés Roget (Argentina) Graciela Morán
26 Apr	River Plate Championships; Buenos Aires, Argentina; Non-tour event	(Soviet Union) Olga Morozova (Netherlands) Betty Stöve; 7–5, 6–1	(Argentina) Beatriz Araujo (Argentina) Ines Roget	(Netherlands) Betty Stöve (Argentina) Beatriz Araujo	(Argentina) Marta Fernández Ruiz (Argentina) Raquel Giscafré (Argentina) Inés Roget (Argentina) Graciela Morán

=== May ===
Week	Tournament	Champions	Runners-up	Semifinalists	Quarterfinalists
3 May	Italian Open; Rome, Italy; Non-tour event	(United Kingdom) Virginia Wade; 6–4, 6–4	(West Germany) Helga Niessen Masthoff	(Germany) Helga Schultze (France) Gail Chanfreau	(Czechoslovakia) Marie Neumannová (Australia) Lesley Bowrey (Italy) Lea Pericoli (South Africa) Laura Rossouw
3 May	Italian Open; Rome, Italy; Non-tour event	(West Germany) Helga Niessen Masthoff (United Kingdom) Virginia Wade; 5–7, 6–2, 6–2	(Australia) Lesley Bowrey (Australia) Helen Gourlay	(Germany) Helga Schultze (France) Gail Chanfreau	(Czechoslovakia) Marie Neumannová (Australia) Lesley Bowrey (Italy) Lea Pericoli (South Africa) Laura Rossouw
3 May	Tulsa Claycourts; Tulsa, Oklahoma, United States; Non-tour event 10S/4D	(United States) Chris Evert; 6–0, 6–3	(United States) Mary-Ann Eisel	(United States) Laura duPont (United States) Marcie Louie	(United States) Jeanne Evert (United States) Karin Benson (United States) Kathy Kraft (United States) Sue Stap
3 May	Tulsa Claycourts; Tulsa, Oklahoma, United States; Non-tour event 10S/4D	(United States) Mary-Ann Eisel (United States) Karin Benson; 2–6, 7–5, 7–5	(United States) Chris Evert (United States) Jeanne Evert	(United States) Laura duPont (United States) Marcie Louie	(United States) Jeanne Evert (United States) Karin Benson (United States) Kathy Kraft (United States) Sue Stap
10 May	London Hard Court Championships; London, England; Grand Prix Circuit (C)	(Australia) Margaret Court; 6–0, 6–3	(France) Françoise Dürr	(France) Gail Chanfreau (United Kingdom) Virginia Wade	(United States) Julie Heldman (United Kingdom) Nell Truman (Australia) Judy Dalton (United States) Rosie Casals
10 May	London Hard Court Championships; London, England; Grand Prix Circuit (C)	(United States) Rosie Casals (United States) Billie Jean King; 6–1, 6–4	(Australia) Margaret Court (Australia) Evonne Goolagong	(France) Gail Chanfreau (United Kingdom) Virginia Wade	(United States) Julie Heldman (United Kingdom) Nell Truman (Australia) Judy Dalton (United States) Rosie Casals
17 May	British Hard Court Championships; Bournemouth, England; Grand Prix Circuit (B)	(Australia) Margaret Court; 7–5, 6–1	(Australia) Evonne Goolagong	(France) Françoise Dürr (United States) Mary–Ann Curtis	(United Kingdom) Winnie Shaw (United States) Tory Fretz (Netherlands) Betty Stöve (United States) Patti Hogan
17 May	British Hard Court Championships; Bournemouth, England; Grand Prix Circuit (B)	(United States) Mary–Ann Curtis (France) Françoise Dürr; 6–3, 5–7, 6–4	(Australia) Margaret Court (Australia) Evonne Goolagong	(France) Françoise Dürr (United States) Mary–Ann Curtis	(United Kingdom) Winnie Shaw (United States) Tory Fretz (Netherlands) Betty Stöve (United States) Patti Hogan
17 May	Grand Prix German Open; Hamburg, West Germany; Grand Prix Circuit (B)	(United States) Billie Jean King; 6–3, 6–2	(West Germany) Helga Masthoff	(West Germany) Helga Hösl (United States) Rosie Casals	(West Germany) Heide Orth (United States) Valerie Ziegenfuss (Japan) Kazuko Sawamatsu (Australia) Kerry Melville
17 May	Grand Prix German Open; Hamburg, West Germany; Grand Prix Circuit (B)	(United States) Rosie Casals (United States) Billie Jean King; 6–2, 6–1	(West Germany) Helga Masthoff (West Germany) Heide Orth	(West Germany) Helga Hösl (United States) Rosie Casals	(West Germany) Heide Orth (United States) Valerie Ziegenfuss (Japan) Kazuko Sawamatsu (Australia) Kerry Melville
24 May; 31 May	French Open; Paris, France; Grand Slam (A); Clay – 64S/44Q/32D/38X; Singles – Doubles – Mixed doubles	(Australia) Evonne Goolagong; 6–3, 7–5	(Australia) Helen Gourlay	(Netherlands) Marijke Schaar (United States) Nancy Richey	(United States) Linda Tuero (France) Françoise Dürr (Australia) Lesley Bowrey (France) Gail Chanfreau
24 May; 31 May	French Open; Paris, France; Grand Slam (A); Clay – 64S/44Q/32D/38X; Singles – Doubles – Mixed doubles	(France) Gail Chanfreau (France) Françoise Dürr; 6–4, 6–1	(Australia) Helen Gourlay (Australia) Kerry Harris	(Netherlands) Marijke Schaar (United States) Nancy Richey	(United States) Linda Tuero (France) Françoise Dürr (Australia) Lesley Bowrey (France) Gail Chanfreau
24 May; 31 May	French Open; Paris, France; Grand Slam (A); Clay – 64S/44Q/32D/38X; Singles – Doubles – Mixed doubles	(France) Jean-Claude Barclay (France) Françoise Dürr; 6–3, 6–4	(Soviet Union) Toomas Leius (United Kingdom) Winnie Shaw	(Netherlands) Marijke Schaar (United States) Nancy Richey	(United States) Linda Tuero (France) Françoise Dürr (Australia) Lesley Bowrey (France) Gail Chanfreau

=== June ===
Week	Tournament	Champions	Runners-up	Semifinalists	Quarterfinalists
7 Jun	Players Nottingham; Nottingham, United Kingdom; Non-tour event Singles – Doubles	(United States) Julie Heldman; 6–4, 7–9, 6–3	(Australia) Barbara Hawcroft	(Australia) Helen Amos (South Africa) Laura Rossouw	(South Africa) Brenda Kirk (Chile) Michelle Rodríguez (Australia) Patricia Faulkner (Sweden) Madeleine Pegel
7 Jun	Players Nottingham; Nottingham, United Kingdom; Non-tour event Singles – Doubles	(France) Françoise Dürr (United States) Julie Heldman; 6–0, 6–3	(Chile) Ana María Pinto Bravo (Argentina) Raquel Giscafré	(Australia) Helen Amos (South Africa) Laura Rossouw	(South Africa) Brenda Kirk (Chile) Michelle Rodríguez (Australia) Patricia Faulkner (Sweden) Madeleine Pegel
7 Jun	Kent Championships; Beckenham, United Kingdom; Non-tour event Singles – Doubles	(Australia) Kerry Melville; 6–0, 3–6, 9–7	(United States) Kristy Pigeon	(United States) Patti Hogan (Australia) Wendy Gilchrist	(United States) Tam O'Shaughnessy (United States) Janet Newberry (Netherlands) Betty Stöve (United Kingdom) Christine Janes
7 Jun	Kent Championships; Beckenham, United Kingdom; Non-tour event Singles – Doubles	(United Kingdom) Christine Truman (United Kingdom) Nell Truman; 6–3, 9–7	(Soviet Union) Olga Morozova (Soviet Union) Zaiga Yanzone	(United States) Patti Hogan (Australia) Wendy Gilchrist	(United States) Tam O'Shaughnessy (United States) Janet Newberry (Netherlands) Betty Stöve (United Kingdom) Christine Janes
14 Jun	Queen's Club Championships; London, England; Grand Prix Circuit (D); Grass – 64S/32D	(Australia) Margaret Court; 6–3, 3–6, 6–3	(United States) Billie Jean King	(United States) Rosie Casals (United Kingdom) Virginia Wade	(United States) Kristy Pigeon (United Kingdom) Jill Cooper (United Kingdom) Christine Janes (Australia) Helen Gourlay
14 Jun	Queen's Club Championships; London, England; Grand Prix Circuit (D); Grass – 64S/32D	(United States) Rosie Casals (United States) Billie Jean King; 6–2, 8–6	(United States) Mary–Ann Curtis (United States) Valerie Ziegenfuss	(United States) Rosie Casals (United Kingdom) Virginia Wade	(United States) Kristy Pigeon (United Kingdom) Jill Cooper (United Kingdom) Christine Janes (Australia) Helen Gourlay
21 Jun; 28 June	Wimbledon Championships; London, England; Grand Slam (A); Grass – 96S/24D/80X; Singles – Doubles – Mixed doubles	(Australia) Evonne Goolagong; 6–4, 6–1	(Australia) Margaret Court	(Australia) Judy Tegart-Dalton (United States) Billie Jean King	(United Kingdom) Winnie Shaw (Australia) Kerry Melville (United States) Nancy Richey (France) Françoise Dürr
21 Jun; 28 June	Wimbledon Championships; London, England; Grand Slam (A); Grass – 96S/24D/80X; Singles – Doubles – Mixed doubles	(United States) Rosie Casals (United States) Billie Jean King; 6–3, 6–2	(Australia) Margaret Court (Australia) Evonne Goolagong	(Australia) Judy Tegart-Dalton (United States) Billie Jean King	(United Kingdom) Winnie Shaw (Australia) Kerry Melville (United States) Nancy Richey (France) Françoise Dürr
21 Jun; 28 June	Wimbledon Championships; London, England; Grand Slam (A); Grass – 96S/24D/80X; Singles – Doubles – Mixed doubles	(Australia) Owen Davidson (United States) Billie Jean King; 3–6, 6–2, 15–13	(United States) Marty Riessen (Australia) Margaret Court	(Australia) Judy Tegart-Dalton (United States) Billie Jean King	(United Kingdom) Winnie Shaw (Australia) Kerry Melville (United States) Nancy Richey (France) Françoise Dürr

=== July ===
Week	Tournament	Champions	Runners-up	Semifinalists	Quarterfinalists
5 Jul	Swedish Open; Båstad, Sweden; Grand Prix Circuit (B); Clay – 32S/32D	(West Germany) Helga Masthoff; 4–6, 6–1, 6–3	(Sweden) Ingrid Bentzer	(Sweden) Christina Sandberg (United States) Linda Tuero	(Chile) Ana María Pinto Bravo (West Germany) Heide Orth (Sweden) Ann-Charlotte Dahlberg (France) Odile de Roubin
5 Jul	Swedish Open; Båstad, Sweden; Grand Prix Circuit (B); Clay – 32S/32D	(West Germany) Helga Masthoff (West Germany) Heide Orth; 6–2, 6–1	(Chile) Ana María Pinto Bravo (United States) Linda Tuero	(Sweden) Christina Sandberg (United States) Linda Tuero	(Chile) Ana María Pinto Bravo (West Germany) Heide Orth (Sweden) Ann-Charlotte Dahlberg (France) Odile de Roubin
5 Jul	Open Welsh Championships; Newport, Wales; Grand Prix Circuit (C); Grass – 32S/16D	(United Kingdom) Virginia Wade; 6–3, 6–4	(Australia) Judy Tegart-Dalton	(United Kingdom) Winnie Shaw (Australia) Helen Gourlay	(Australia) Kerry Harris (United Kingdom) Elizabeth James (France) Gail Chanfreau (United Kingdom) Joyce Williams
5 Jul	Open Welsh Championships; Newport, Wales; Grand Prix Circuit (C); Grass – 32S/16D	(Australia) Helen Gourlay (Australia) Kerry Harris; 6–3, 8–6	(France) Gail Chanfreau (United Kingdom) Winnie Shaw	(United Kingdom) Winnie Shaw (Australia) Helen Gourlay	(Australia) Kerry Harris (United Kingdom) Elizabeth James (France) Gail Chanfreau (United Kingdom) Joyce Williams
5 Jul	Swiss Open; Gstaad, Switzerland; Grand Prix Circuit (B); Clay – 32S/16D	(France) Françoise Dürr; 6–3, 6–3	(Australia) Lesley Hunt	(Netherlands) Marijke Schaar (Czechoslovakia) Alena Palmeová-West	(Italy) Lea Pericoli (Italy) Fiorella Bonicelli (Switzerland) Silvia Gubler (South Africa) Laura Rossouw
5 Jul	Swiss Open; Gstaad, Switzerland; Grand Prix Circuit (B); Clay – 32S/16D	(South Africa) Brenda Kirk (South Africa) Laura Rossouw; 8–6, 6–3	(France) Françoise Dürr (Italy) Lea Pericoli	(Netherlands) Marijke Schaar (Czechoslovakia) Alena Palmeová-West	(Italy) Lea Pericoli (Italy) Fiorella Bonicelli (Switzerland) Silvia Gubler (South Africa) Laura Rossouw
5 Jul	Carroll's Irish Open; Dublin, Ireland; Non-tour event	(Australia) Margaret Court; 6–3, 2–6, 6–3	(Australia) Evonne Goolagong	(Netherlands) Betty Stöve (Australia) Lesley Bowrey	(Republic of Ireland) Geraldine Barniville (Republic of Ireland) Sue Minford (United Kingdom) Veronica Burton (United States) Tam O'Shaughnessy
5 Jul	Carroll's Irish Open; Dublin, Ireland; Non-tour event	(Australia) Lesley Bowrey (Netherlands) Betty Stöve; 7–5, 6–1	(Australia) Margaret Court (Australia) Evonne Goolagong	(Netherlands) Betty Stöve (Australia) Lesley Bowrey	(Republic of Ireland) Geraldine Barniville (Republic of Ireland) Sue Minford (United Kingdom) Veronica Burton (United States) Tam O'Shaughnessy
12 Jul	North of England Championships; Hoylake, England; Grand Prix Circuit (C); Grass – 32S/16D; Singles – Doubles	(United States) Billie Jean King; 6–3, 6–3	(United States) Rosie Casals	(Australia) Margaret Court (United States) Patti Hogan	(Australia) Evonne Goolagong (Australia) Judy Tegart-Dalton (United Kingdom) Virginia Wade (United States) Julie Heldman
12 Jul	North of England Championships; Hoylake, England; Grand Prix Circuit (C); Grass – 32S/16D; Singles – Doubles	(United States) Rosie Casals (United States) Billie Jean King walkover	(Australia) Margaret Court (Australia) Evonne Goolagong	(Australia) Margaret Court (United States) Patti Hogan	(Australia) Evonne Goolagong (Australia) Judy Tegart-Dalton (United Kingdom) Virginia Wade (United States) Julie Heldman
19 Jul	Green Shield Midland Championships; Leicester, England; Non-tour event Singles – Doubles	(Australia) Evonne Goolagong; 6–2, 6–4	(United States) Patti Hogan	(Australia) Helen Gourlay (Australia) Judy Tegart-Dalton	(United States) Kristien Kemmer (Australia) Kerry Harris (Australia) Barbara Hawcroft (Australia) Fay Toyne
19 Jul	Green Shield Midland Championships; Leicester, England; Non-tour event Singles – Doubles	(Australia) Judy Tegart-Dalton (Australia) Evonne Goolagong; 8–6, 6–4	(Australia) Barbara Hawcroft (United States) Patti Hogan	(Australia) Helen Gourlay (Australia) Judy Tegart-Dalton	(United States) Kristien Kemmer (Australia) Kerry Harris (Australia) Barbara Hawcroft (Australia) Fay Toyne
19 Jul	Austrian Open; Kitzbühel, Austria; Non-tour event Singles – Doubles	(United States) Billie Jean King; 6–2, 4–6, 7–5	(South Africa) Laura Rossouw	(Germany) Helga Schultze (United States) Rosie Casals	(Germany) Heide Orth (United States) Tory Fretz (Chile) Ana María Arias (South Africa) Brenda Kirk
19 Jul	Austrian Open; Kitzbühel, Austria; Non-tour event Singles – Doubles	(United States) Rosie Casals (United States) Billie Jean King; 6–2, 6–4	(West Germany) Helga Niessen Masthoff (West Germany) Heide Orth	(Germany) Helga Schultze (United States) Rosie Casals	(Germany) Heide Orth (United States) Tory Fretz (Chile) Ana María Arias (South Africa) Brenda Kirk
26 Jul	Dutch Open Championships; Hilversum, Netherlands; Non-tour event Singles – Doubles	(Australia) Evonne Goolagong; 8–6, 6–3	(Sweden) Christina Sandberg	(West Germany) Cora Schediwy (Netherlands) Betty Stöve	(Netherlands) Trudy Waldhof (West Germany) Katja Ebbinghaus (South Africa) Brenda Kirk (Czechoslovakia) Alena Palmeová-West
26 Jul	Dutch Open Championships; Hilversum, Netherlands; Non-tour event Singles – Doubles	(Sweden) Christina Sandberg (Netherlands) Betty Stöve; 6–1, 6–2	(West Germany) Katja Ebbinghaus (Netherlands) Trudy Waldhof	(West Germany) Cora Schediwy (Netherlands) Betty Stöve	(Netherlands) Trudy Waldhof (West Germany) Katja Ebbinghaus (South Africa) Brenda Kirk (Czechoslovakia) Alena Palmeová-West

=== August ===
Week	Tournament	Champions	Runners-up	Semifinalists	Quarterfinalists
2 Aug	Virginia Slims International; Houston, United States; Virginia Slims $40,000; Singles – Doubles	(United States) Billie Jean King; 6–4, 4–6, 6–1	(Australia) Kerry Melville	3rd: (United States) Nancy Richey; 4th: (Australia) Judy Tegart-Dalton	(United States) Mary-Ann Eisel (United States) Julie Heldman (France) Françoise Dürr (United States) Rosie Casals
2 Aug	Virginia Slims International; Houston, United States; Virginia Slims $40,000; Singles – Doubles	(United States) Rosie Casals (United States) Billie Jean King; 6–3, 1–6, 6–2	(Australia) Judy Tegart-Dalton (France) Françoise Dürr	3rd: (United States) Nancy Richey; 4th: (Australia) Judy Tegart-Dalton	(United States) Mary-Ann Eisel (United States) Julie Heldman (France) Françoise Dürr (United States) Rosie Casals
2 Aug	Cincinnati Open; Cincinnati, United States; Grand Prix Circuit (C); Hard – 32S/16D	(United Kingdom) Virginia Wade; 6–3, 6–3	(United States) Linda Tuero	(France) Gail Chanfreau (Australia) Helen Gourlay	(France) Nathalie Fuchs (United Kingdom) Winnie Shaw (United States) Sue Stap (Australia) Kerry Harris
2 Aug	Cincinnati Open; Cincinnati, United States; Grand Prix Circuit (C); Hard – 32S/16D	(Australia) Helen Gourlay (Australia) Kerry Harris; 6–4, 6–4	(France) Gail Chanfreau (United Kingdom) Winnie Shaw	(France) Gail Chanfreau (Australia) Helen Gourlay	(France) Nathalie Fuchs (United Kingdom) Winnie Shaw (United States) Sue Stap (Australia) Kerry Harris
9 Aug	Women's Clay Court Championships; Indianapolis, US; Grand Prix Circuit (D); Clay – 32S/16D	(United States) Billie Jean King; 6–4, 7–5	(United States) Linda Tuero	(Australia) Helen Gourlay (France) Gail Chanfreau	(United States) Julie Heldman (United Kingdom) Winnie Shaw (Australia) Kerry Harris (Australia) Kerry Melville
9 Aug	Women's Clay Court Championships; Indianapolis, US; Grand Prix Circuit (D); Clay – 32S/16D	(Australia) Judy Dalton (United States) Billie Jean King; 6–1, 6–2	(United States) Julie Heldman (United States) Linda Tuero	(Australia) Helen Gourlay (France) Gail Chanfreau	(United States) Julie Heldman (United Kingdom) Winnie Shaw (Australia) Kerry Harris (Australia) Kerry Melville
16 Aug	Virginia Slims of Chicago; Lake Bluff, Illinois, United States; Virginia Slims; Clay – $20,000; Singles – Doubles	(France) Françoise Dürr; 6–4, 6–2	(United States) Billie Jean King	(United States) Nancy Richey (United States) Rosie Casals	(Australia) Lesley Hunt (United States) Betty Ann Hansen (Australia) Judy Tegart-Dalton (United States) Linda Tuero
16 Aug	Virginia Slims of Chicago; Lake Bluff, Illinois, United States; Virginia Slims; Clay – $20,000; Singles – Doubles	(Australia) Judy Tegart-Dalton (France) Françoise Dürr; 6–4, 7–6	(United States) Rosie Casals (United States) Billie Jean King	(United States) Nancy Richey (United States) Rosie Casals	(Australia) Lesley Hunt (United States) Betty Ann Hansen (Australia) Judy Tegart-Dalton (United States) Linda Tuero
16 Aug	Wightman Cup; Cleveland, United States; Hard (i); Team event	United States; 4–3	Great Britain		
23 Aug	Eastern Grass Court Championships; South Orange NJ, United States; Grand Prix Circuit (C); Grass – 64S/32D	(United States) Chris Evert; 6–4, 6–0	(Australia) Helen Gourlay	(United Kingdom) Winnie Shaw (Indonesia) Lita Liem	(Indonesia) Lany Kaligis (United Kingdom) Joyce Williams (United Kingdom) Virginia Wade (Australia) Lesley Bowrey
23 Aug	Eastern Grass Court Championships; South Orange NJ, United States; Grand Prix Circuit (C); Grass – 64S/32D	Cancelled		(United Kingdom) Winnie Shaw (Indonesia) Lita Liem	(Indonesia) Lany Kaligis (United Kingdom) Joyce Williams (United Kingdom) Virginia Wade (Australia) Lesley Bowrey
30 Aug	Virginia Slims of Newport; Newport, United States; Virginia Slims; Grass – $20,000; Singles – Doubles	(Australia) Kerry Melville; 6–3, 6–7^{(3–5)}, 7–6^{(5–4)}	(France) Françoise Dürr	(United States) Billie Jean King (United States) Rosie Casals	(Sweden) Christina Sandberg (Australia) Judy Tegart-Dalton (Australia) Lesley Hunt (United States) Mary-Ann Eisel
30 Aug	Virginia Slims of Newport; Newport, United States; Virginia Slims; Grass – $20,000; Singles – Doubles	(Australia) Judy Tegart-Dalton (France) Françoise Dürr; 6–2, 6–1	(Australia) Kerry Harris (Australia) Kerry Melville	(United States) Billie Jean King (United States) Rosie Casals	(Sweden) Christina Sandberg (Australia) Judy Tegart-Dalton (Australia) Lesley Hunt (United States) Mary-Ann Eisel
30 Aug; 6 Sep	US Open; New York, United States; Grand Slam (A); Grass – 64S/32D/47X; Singles – Doubles – Mixed doubles	(United States) Billie Jean King; 6–4, 7–6^{(5–2)}	(United States) Rosie Casals	(United States) Chris Evert (Australia) Kerry Melville	(United States) Laura du Pont (Australia) Lesley Hunt (Australia) Judy Tegart-Dalton (United Kingdom) Joyce Williams
30 Aug; 6 Sep	US Open; New York, United States; Grand Slam (A); Grass – 64S/32D/47X; Singles – Doubles – Mixed doubles	(United States) Rosie Casals (Australia) Judy Tegart-Dalton; 6–3, 6–3	(France) Gail Chanfreau (France) Françoise Dürr	(United States) Chris Evert (Australia) Kerry Melville	(United States) Laura du Pont (Australia) Lesley Hunt (Australia) Judy Tegart-Dalton (United Kingdom) Joyce Williams
30 Aug; 6 Sep	US Open; New York, United States; Grand Slam (A); Grass – 64S/32D/47X; Singles – Doubles – Mixed doubles	(Australia) Owen Davidson (United States) Billie Jean King; 6–3, 7–5	(South Africa) Bob Maud (Netherlands) Betty Stöve	(United States) Chris Evert (Australia) Kerry Melville	(United States) Laura du Pont (Australia) Lesley Hunt (Australia) Judy Tegart-Dalton (United Kingdom) Joyce Williams

=== September ===
Week	Tournament	Champions	Runners-up	Semifinalists	Quarterfinalists
13 Sep	Virginia Slims of Louisville; Louisville, United States; Virginia Slims $20,000; Singles – Doubles	(United States) Billie Jean King; 6–1, 4–6, 6–3	(United States) Rosie Casals	(Australia) Kerry Melville (France) Françoise Dürr	(Indonesia) Lita Liem (Czechoslovakia) Alena Palmeová-West (Australia) Helen Gourlay (United States) Margaret Cooper
13 Sep	Virginia Slims of Louisville; Louisville, United States; Virginia Slims $20,000; Singles – Doubles	(Australia) Judy Tegart-Dalton (France) Françoise Dürr; 2–6, 6–4, 6–3	(Australia) Kerry Melville (Netherlands) Betty Stöve	(Australia) Kerry Melville (France) Françoise Dürr	(Indonesia) Lita Liem (Czechoslovakia) Alena Palmeová-West (Australia) Helen Gourlay (United States) Margaret Cooper
20 Sep	Pacific Southwest Championships; Los Angeles, United States; Grand Prix Circuit (B); Carpet (i) – 32S/16D	(United States) Billie Jean King vs. (United States) Rosie Casals; 6–6 double default		(Australia) Kerry Melville (France) Françoise Dürr	(United States) Wendy Overton (Australia) Lesley Hunt (Australia) Helen Gourlay (Australia) Judy Tegart-Dalton
20 Sep	Pacific Southwest Championships; Los Angeles, United States; Grand Prix Circuit (B); Carpet (i) – 32S/16D	(United States) Rosie Casals (United States) Billie Jean King; 6–3, 6–2	(Australia) Judy Tegart-Dalton (France) Françoise Dürr	(Australia) Kerry Melville (France) Françoise Dürr	(United States) Wendy Overton (Australia) Lesley Hunt (Australia) Helen Gourlay (Australia) Judy Tegart-Dalton
27 Sep	Virginia Slims Thunderbird Classic; Phoenix, United States; Virginia Slims; Hard – $20,000 – 32S/4D; Singles – Doubles	(United States) Billie Jean King; 7–5, 6–1	(United States) Rosie Casals	(Australia) Kerry Melville (Australia) Nancy Richey Gunter	(United States) Wendy Overton (Australia) Judy Tegart-Dalton (France) Françoise Dürr (Australia) Lesley Hunt
27 Sep	Virginia Slims Thunderbird Classic; Phoenix, United States; Virginia Slims; Hard – $20,000 – 32S/4D; Singles – Doubles	(United States) Rosie Casals (United States) Billie Jean King; 6–3, 6–2	(Australia) Judy Tegart-Dalton (France) Françoise Dürr	(Australia) Kerry Melville (Australia) Nancy Richey Gunter	(United States) Wendy Overton (Australia) Judy Tegart-Dalton (France) Françoise Dürr (Australia) Lesley Hunt

=== October ===
Week	Tournament	Champions	Runners-up	Semifinalists	Quarterfinalists
11 Oct	Dewar Cup Edinburgh; Edinburgh, United Kingdom; Non-tour event Singles – Doubles	(Australia) Evonne Goolagong; 6–0, 6–3	(France) Françoise Dürr	(United Kingdom) Jackie Fayter (United Kingdom) Virginia Wade	(United Kingdom) Corinne Molesworth (United Kingdom) Winnie Shaw (United States) Patti Hogan (United States) Julie Heldman
11 Oct	Dewar Cup Edinburgh; Edinburgh, United Kingdom; Non-tour event Singles – Doubles	(Australia) Evonne Goolagong (United States) Julie Heldman; 6–3, 6–0	(United States) Patti Hogan (United Kingdom) Nell Truman	(United Kingdom) Jackie Fayter (United Kingdom) Virginia Wade	(United Kingdom) Corinne Molesworth (United Kingdom) Winnie Shaw (United States) Patti Hogan (United States) Julie Heldman
18 Oct	Dewar Cup Billingham; Billingham, United Kingdom; Non-tour event 15S/4D; Singles – Doubles	(United Kingdom) Virginia Wade; 4–6, 7–5, 6–3	(United States) Julie Heldman	(Australia) Evonne Goolagong (France) Françoise Dürr	(Netherlands) Betty Stöve (United Kingdom) Cathie Lorains (United Kingdom) Winnie Shaw (United States) Patti Hogan
18 Oct	Dewar Cup Billingham; Billingham, United Kingdom; Non-tour event 15S/4D; Singles – Doubles	(France) Françoise Dürr (United Kingdom) Virginia Wade; 6–3, 4–6, 6–2	(Australia) Evonne Goolagong (United States) Julie Heldman	(Australia) Evonne Goolagong (France) Françoise Dürr	(Netherlands) Betty Stöve (United Kingdom) Cathie Lorains (United Kingdom) Winnie Shaw (United States) Patti Hogan
25 Oct	Embassy British Indoor Championships; London, England; Grand Prix Circuit (B); Carpet – 32S/16D	(United States) Billie Jean King; 6–1, 5–7, 7–5	(France) Françoise Dürr	(United States) Rosemary Casals (Australia) Evonne Goolagong	(United States) Patti Hogan (Netherlands) Betty Stöve (United Kingdom) Virginia Wade (United Kingdom) Winnie Shaw
25 Oct	Embassy British Indoor Championships; London, England; Grand Prix Circuit (B); Carpet – 32S/16D	(France) Françoise Dürr (United Kingdom) Virginia Wade; 3–6, 7–5, 6–3	(Australia) Evonne Goolagong (United States) Julie Heldman	(United States) Rosemary Casals (Australia) Evonne Goolagong	(United States) Patti Hogan (Netherlands) Betty Stöve (United Kingdom) Virginia Wade (United Kingdom) Winnie Shaw

=== November ===
Week	Tournament	Champions	Runners-up	Semifinalists	Quarterfinalists
1 Nov	Dewar Cup Aberavon; Aberavon, United Kingdom; Non-tour event	(United Kingdom) Virginia Wade; 7–6, 6–3	(Australia) Evonne Goolagong	(United States) Julie Heldman (France) Françoise Dürr	(Australia) Wendy Gilchrist (United Kingdom) Winnie Shaw (United States) Patti Hogan (Netherlands) Betty Stöve
1 Nov	Dewar Cup Aberavon; Aberavon, United Kingdom; Non-tour event	(France) Françoise Dürr (United Kingdom) Virginia Wade; 7–5, 6–4	(Australia) Evonne Goolagong (United States) Julie Heldman	(United States) Julie Heldman (France) Françoise Dürr	(Australia) Wendy Gilchrist (United Kingdom) Winnie Shaw (United States) Patti Hogan (Netherlands) Betty Stöve
8 Nov	Dewar Cup Torquay; Torquay, United Kingdom; Non-tour event 16S/4D	(Australia) Evonne Goolagong; 6–1, 6–0	(France) Françoise Dürr	(United States) Julie Heldman (United Kingdom) Virginia Wade	(United Kingdom) Jackie Fayter (United Kingdom) Winnie Shaw (United Kingdom) Penny Moor (Netherlands) Betty Stöve
8 Nov	Dewar Cup Torquay; Torquay, United Kingdom; Non-tour event 16S/4D	(Australia) Evonne Goolagong (United States) Julie Heldman; 7–6, 6–4	(France) Françoise Dürr (United Kingdom) Virginia Wade	(United States) Julie Heldman (United Kingdom) Virginia Wade	(United Kingdom) Jackie Fayter (United Kingdom) Winnie Shaw (United Kingdom) Penny Moor (Netherlands) Betty Stöve
15 Nov	Dewar Cup Championships; London, United Kingdom; Non-tour event	(United Kingdom) Virginia Wade; 6–1, 6–3	(United States) Julie Heldman	(France) Françoise Dürr (Australia) Evonne Goolagong	(Netherlands) Betty Stöve (United Kingdom) Winnie Shaw (United Kingdom) Jackie Fayter (United States) Patti Hogan
15 Nov	Dewar Cup Championships; London, United Kingdom; Non-tour event	(Australia) Evonne Goolagong (United States) Julie Heldman; 7–5, 6–4	(France) Françoise Dürr (United Kingdom) Virginia Wade	(France) Françoise Dürr (Australia) Evonne Goolagong	(Netherlands) Betty Stöve (United Kingdom) Winnie Shaw (United Kingdom) Jackie Fayter (United States) Patti Hogan
29 Nov	Clean Air Classic; New York City, United States; Non-tour event	(United Kingdom) Virginia Wade; 6–3, 6–3	(United States) Rosie Casals		

=== December ===
Week	Tournament	Champions	Runners-up	Semifinalists	Quarterfinalists
1 Dec	Benson & Hedges International; Christchurch, New Zealand; Non-tour event Singles – Doubles	(France) Françoise Dürr; 6–3, 6–0	(United States) Billie Jean King	(United States) Rosemary Casals (Australia) Kerry Melville	(Australia) Lesley Hunt (United States) Kristien Kemmer (United States) Valerie Ziegenfuss (Australia) Judy Tegart-Dalton
1 Dec	Benson & Hedges International; Christchurch, New Zealand; Non-tour event Singles – Doubles	(United States) Rosie Casals (United States) Billie Jean King; 6–3, 9–8^{(8–6)}	(Australia) Judy Tegart-Dalton (France) Françoise Dürr	(United States) Rosemary Casals (Australia) Kerry Melville	(Australia) Lesley Hunt (United States) Kristien Kemmer (United States) Valerie Ziegenfuss (Australia) Judy Tegart-Dalton

== Awarding points system ==
=== Grand Prix Circuit ===
The Grand Prix tournaments were divided into four groups. Group A consisted of the three Grand Slam events – French Open, Wimbledon Championships and US Open – while the other tournaments were divided into Groups B, C and D by prize money and draw size. Points were allocated based on these groups and the finishing position of a player in a tournament. The points allocation is listed below:

Group A
- Champion: 40
- Runner-up: 30
- Semifinalist: 20
- Quarterfinalist: 10
- Round of 16: 5
- Round of 32: 3

Group B
- Champion: 30
- Runner-up: 20
- Semifinalist: 10
- Quarterfinalist: 5
- Round of 16: 3
- Round of 32: –

Group C
- Champion: 20
- Runner-up: 12
- Semifinalist: 6
- Quarterfinalist: 4
- Round of 16: 2
- Round of 32: –

Group D
- Champion: 15
- Runner-up: 9
- Semifinalist: 5
- Quarterfinalist: 3
- Round of 16:: –
- Round of 32: –

=== Standings and bonus pool earnings ===
A bonus pool of $50,000 was available for the top 13 points ranked players. To qualify for a share of the bonus pool the players had to participate in a minimum of nine tournaments.

Rk	Name	Tour.	Points	Bonus
1	(United States) Billie Jean King	9	181	$10,000
2	(France) Françoise Dürr	9	119	$7,500
3	(Australia) Evonne Goolagong (Note: Player did not participate in the required minimum of nine tournaments and therefore did not share in the bonus pool.)	6	116	–
4	(Australia) Margaret Court	6	106	–
5	(Australia) Helen Gourlay	12	83	$6,500
6	(United States) Rosemary Casals	8	71	–
7	(Australia) Judy Dalton	9	70	$5,250
8	(United Kingdom) Virginia Wade	10	69	$4,000
9	(United States) Linda Tuero	7	60	–
10	(Australia) Kerry Melville	7	55	–

== Top 10 World Rankings ==
The 1971 singles rankings as per Lance Tingay.

World ranking
No	Player Name
1	Evonne Goolagong (AUS)
2	Margaret Court (AUS)
3	Billie Jean King (USA)
4	Rosemary Casals (USA)
5	Kerry Melville (AUS)
6	Judy Dalton (AUS)
7	Françoise Dürr (FRA)
8	Virginia Wade (GBR)
9	Helga Masthoff (FRG)
10	Chris Evert (USA)

Under 21 world ranking
No	Player Name
1	Evonne Goolagong (AUS)
2	Chris Evert (USA)
3	Lesley Hunt (AUS)
4	Denise Carter-Triolo (USA)
5	Kristy Pigeon (USA)
6	Kazuko Sawamatsu (JPN)
7	Linda Tuero (USA)
8	Kristien Kemmer (USA)
9	Barbara Hawcroft (AUS)
10	Eliza Pande (USA)

== Prize money leaders ==
No.	Player Name	Prize money
1	Billie Jean King (USA)	$117,000
2	Françoise Dürr (FRA)	$65,000
3	Rosemary Casals (USA)	$62,000
4	Judy Dalton (AUS)	$33,876
5	Kerry Melville (AUS)	$29,767
6	Ann Jones (GBR)	$26,148
7	Margaret Court (AUS)	$26,000
8	Evonne Goolagong (AUS)	$25,000
9	Virginia Wade (GBR)	$24,000
10	Nancy Gunter (USA)	$15,300

== Statistical information ==
These tables present the number of singles (S), doubles (D), and mixed doubles (X) titles won by each player and each nation during the 1971 Virginia Slims Circuit. They also include data for the Grand Slam tournaments.

1. total number of titles (a doubles title won by two players representing the same nation counts as only one win for the nation);
2. highest amount of highest category tournaments (for example, having a single Grand Slam gives preference over any kind of combination without a Grand Slam title);
3. a singles > doubles > mixed doubles hierarchy;
4. alphabetical order (by family names for players).

=== Key ===
Grand Slam tournaments
Virginia Slims events

=== Titles won by player ===
Total	Player	S	D	X	S	D	S	D	X
38	Billie Jean King (USA)	●	●	● ●	● ● ● ● ● ● ● ● ● ● ●	● ● ● ● ● ● ● ● ● ●	17	19	2
21	Rosie Casals (USA)		● ●		● ●	● ● ● ● ● ● ● ● ● ●	2	19	0
19	Evonne Goolagong (AUS)	● ●	●				9	10	0
16	Margaret Court (AUS)	●	●				10	6	0
16	Françoise Durr (FRA)		●	●	● ●	● ● ● ● ● ●	4	12	1
6	Judy Tegart Dalton (AUS)		●			● ● ●	0	6	0
5	Chris Evert (USA)				●		4	1	0
5	Ann Haydon-Jones (GBR)				● ●	● ● ●	2	3	0
2	Gail Chanfreau (FRA)		●				1	1	0
2	Kerry Melville (AUS)				●		1	1	0
2	Mary-Ann Eisel (USA)					●	0	2	0
1	Valerie Ziegenfuss (USA)					●	0	1	0

=== Titles won by nation ===
Total	Nation	S	D	X	S	D	S	D	X
30	United States (USA)	1	2	2	14	11	15	13	2
10	France (FRA)	0	1	1	2	6	2	7	1
9	Australia (AUS)	3	2	0	1	3	4	5	0
7	Great Britain (GBR)	0	0	0	2	5	2	5	0

== See also ==
- 1971 World Championship Tennis circuit
- 1971 Grand Prix tennis circuit
