= 1971 Billie Jean King Invitational =

- Date: January 14–17
- Edition: 1st
- Prize money: $14,000
- Surface: Carpet / indoor
- Location: Long Beach, United States

Champions

Singles
- (United States) Billie Jean King

Doubles
- (United States) Billie Jean King (United States) Rosie Casals
WTA Los Angeles	· 1972 →

The 1971 Billie Jean King Invitational was a women's tennis tournament that took place in Long Beach in the United States. It was part of the 1971 Virginia Slims Circuit and began on January 14, 1971. First seeded Billie Jean King win the singles title.

== Finals ==
=== Singles ===
(United States) Billie Jean King defeated (United States) Rosie Casals 6–1, 6–2

=== Doubles ===
(United States) Billie Jean King / (United States) Rosie Casals defeated (France) Françoise Dürr / (United Kingdom) Ann Jones 7–5, 6–3
