= 1971 Virginia Slims Invitational of New York =

- Date: March 24–27
- Edition: 1st
- Category: WT Pro Tour
- Draw: 16S
- Prize money: $15,000
- Surface: Carpet / indoor
- Location: New York, United States
- Venue: 34th Street Armory
- Attendance: 4,500

Champions

Singles
- (United States) Rosie Casals
Virginia Slims of New York	· 1972 →

The 1971 Virginia Slims Invitational of New York was a women's tennis tournament that took place at the 34th Street Armory in New York in the United States. It was part of the 1971 Virginia Slims Circuit and was held from March 24 through March 27, 1971. Second-seeded Rosie Casals won the tournament and earned $5,000 first-prize money.

== Finals ==
=== Singles ===
(United States) Rosie Casals defeated (United States) Billie Jean King 6–4, 6–4

== Prize money ==
Event	W	F	3rd	4th	QF	Round of 16
Singles	$5,000	$3,000	$1,300	$1,200	$600	$300
