= 1971 Virginia Slims of Milwaukee =

- Date: January 21–24
- Edition: 1st
- Location: Milwaukee, United States

Champions

Singles
- (United States) Billie Jean King

Doubles
- (United States) Billie Jean King (United States) Rosie Casals
- Virginia Slims of Milwaukee

The Virginia Slims of Milwaukee was a women's tennis tournament that took place in Milwaukee, United States and was the only time that a professional tennis tournament took place in Milwaukee and was part of the 1971 Virginia Slims Circuit. The event took place from January 21 to 24, 1971 and saw Billie Jean King take out the singles and doubles with partner Rosie Casals.

== Finals ==
=== Singles ===
(United States) Billie Jean King defeated (United States) Rosie Casals 6–1, 6–2

=== Doubles ===
(United States) Billie Jean King / (United States) Rosie Casals defeated (France) Françoise Dürr / (United Kingdom) Ann Jones 6–3, 1–6, 6–2
