= Clean Air Classic =

Tennis tournament in New York City

Defunct tennis tournament
- Event name: Clean Air Tennis Classic
- Tour: ILTF Independent Tour (1971–72)
- Founded: 1971; 54 years ago
- Abolished: 1972; 53 years ago
- Location: New York City, United States
- Venue: Seventh Regiment Armory
- Surface: Carpet indoors

The Clean Air Classic and also known as the New York Indoor was a men's and women's open international indoor carpet court tennis tournament founded in 1971. It was organised by the USTA with the finals played at Seventh Regiment Armory, New York City, United States, until 1972. This international tournament was part of the ILTF Independent Tour, until 1972 when it was discontinued.

== History ==
On 25 March 1968 the Madison Square Garden Open Tennis Championship was established. The tournament was organised by the USTA and was played on indoor carpet courts. The first two editions were played in the standard tournament format, the 1970 and final edition was played as a round robin tournament with a 3rd and 4th place play off then a final.

In 1971 the owners of Madison Square Garden chose not to renew the tournament and the US tennis Association looked for a replacement New York Indoor event, they approached Combustion Equipment Associates Inc to sponsor a new event this led to the establishment of the Clean Air Tennis Classic tournament that would be played across three venues in Hawthorne, New Jersey and the Vanderbilt International Racquet Club, culminating in the final at the Seventh Regiment Armory.

== Finals ==
=== Men' singles (Feb) ===
(incomplete roll)

| Year | Winners | Runners-up | Score |
|---|---|---|---|
| 1971 | (Socialist Federal Republic of Yugoslavia) Zeljko Franulovic | (United States) Clark Graebner | 7-6, 4–6, 6–2. |
| 1972 | (United States) Stan Smith | (Spain) Juan Gisbert Sr. | 4-6, 7–5, 6–4, 6–1. |

=== Men' singles (Dec) ===
(incomplete roll)

| Year | Winners | Runners-up | Score |
|---|---|---|---|
| 1972 | (United States) Charlie Pasarell | (United States) Pancho Gonzales | 4–6, 6–2, 6–2. |

=== Women's singles (Dec) ===
(incomplete roll)

| Year | Winners | Runners-up | Score |
|---|---|---|---|
| 1972 | (United Kingdom) Virginia Wade | (United States) Rosie Casals | 6–3, 6–3. |
