= 1972 Clean Air Classic (II) =

- Date: December 7–10
- Edition: 2nd
- Prize money: $75,000
- Location: New York, United States
- Venue: Seventh Regiment Armory

Champions

Men's singles
- (United States) Charlie Pasarell

Women's singles
- (United Kingdom) Virginia Wade

Men's doubles
- (United States) Clark Graebner / (South Africa) Frew McMillan
← 1971 ·	Clean Air Classic	· 1973 →

The 1972 Clean Air Classic was a combined men's and women's tennis tournament with the final played at the Seventh Regiment Armory in New York in the United States. It was sanctioned by the Eastern Lawn Tennis Association but was not part of the official Men's Grand Prix or Women's Tennis Circuit. The Clean Air Classic was a replacement tournament for the earlier indoor tournament the Madison Square Garden Challenge Trophy.

It was the third edition of the tournament and second edition of the event held in 1972 the other being held from 21 to 28 February that was won by Stan Smith. This edition was held from December 7 through December 10, 1972. The tournament utilized a distinct scoring system with points instead of the common 0-15-30-40 and a game was won by the first player to reach four points. The singles titles were won by Charlie Pasarell and Virginia Wade.

== Finals ==
=== Men's singles ===
(United States) Charlie Pasarell defeated (United States) Pancho Gonzales 4–6, 6–2, 6–2

=== Men's doubles ===
(United States) Clark Graebner / (South Africa) Frew McMillan defeated (United States) Brian Gottfried / (United States) Dick Stockton 6–3, 6–2

=== Women's singles ===
(United Kingdom) Virginia Wade defeated (United States) Rosie Casals 6–3, 6–3
