= 1971 Virginia Slims National Indoors =

Tennis tournament

- Date: February 26 – March 1
- Edition: 64th
- Category: Virginia Slims circuit
- Draw: 16S / ?D
- Prize money: $12,500
- Surface: Carpet (Sporteze) / indoor
- Location: Winchester, Massachusetts, United States
- Venue: Winchester Indoor Tennis Center
- Attendance: 9,000

Champions

Singles
- (United States) Billie Jean King

Doubles
- (United States) Rosie Casals / (United States) Billie Jean King
← 1970 ·	U.S. Women's Indoor Championships	· 1973 →

The 1971 Virginia Slims National Indoors, officially named the Virginia Slims National Women's Indoor Tennis Championships and also known as the Virginia Slims of Boston, was a women's tennis tournament played on indoor carpet courts at the Winchester Indoor Tennis Center in Winchester, Massachusetts in the United States that was part of the 1971 Virginia Slims World Championship Series. It was the 64th edition of the tournament and was held from February 26 through March 1, 1971. First-seeded Billie Jean King won her fourth singles title at the event after 1966–1968, following a win in the final against Rosie Casals and earned $2,500 first-prize money.

This event replaced the earlier USTA sponsored Ladies World Invitational.

== Finals ==
=== Singles ===
(United States) Billie Jean King defeated (United States) Rosie Casals 4–6, 6–2, 6–3

=== Doubles ===
(United States) Rosie Casals / (United States) Billie Jean King defeated (France) Françoise Dürr / (United Kingdom) Ann Jones 6–4, 7–5

== Prize money ==
Event	W	F	3rd	4th	QF	Round of 16
Singles	$2,500	$1,800	$1,200	$1,000	$600	$300
