= 1971 BMC Invitational =

1971 British Motor Cars Invitational
- Date: January 6–9
- Edition: 1st
- Category: WT Women's Pro Tour
- Draw: 16S / 8D
- Prize money: $15,000
- Surface: Carpet (Sportface) / indoor
- Location: San Francisco, United States
- Venue: Civic Auditorium

Champions

Singles
- (United States) Billie Jean King

Doubles
- (United States) Billie Jean King (United States) Rosie Casals
- British Motor Cars Invitational

The 1971 BMC Invitational, also known as the British Motor Cars Invitational, was a women's tennis tournament that took place on indoor carpet courts at the Civic Auditorium in San Francisco in the United States. It was the initial tournament of the 1971 WT Women's Pro Tour and as such was the first all-female professional tournament as part of a women's tennis tour. The event was held from January 6 through January 9, 1971. The final drew an attendance of 3,100 spectators who saw first-seeded Billie Jean King win the singles title and collect $4,300 first-prize money.

== Finals ==
=== Singles ===
(United States) Billie Jean King defeated (United States) Rosie Casals 6–3, 6–4

=== Doubles ===
(United States) Billie Jean King / (United States) Rosie Casals defeated (France) Françoise Dürr / (United Kingdom) Ann Jones 6–4, 6–7, 6–1

== Prize money ==
Event	W	F	3rd	4th	QF	Round of 16
Singles	$4,300	$2,500	$1,400	$1,000	$600	$300
