= 1971 Virginia Slims Clay Court Championships =

- Date: August 19–22
- Edition: 1st
- Category: WT Pro Tour
- Draw: 16S
- Prize money: $20,000
- Surface: Clay (Green) / outdoor
- Location: Chicago, Illinois, U.S.
- Venue: Lake Bluff Bath & Tennis Club

Champions

Singles
- (France) Françoise Dürr

Doubles
- (Australia) Judy Dalton / (France) Françoise Dürr
- Virginia Slims of Chicago

The Virginia Slims Clay Court Championships, also known as the Virginia Slims of Chicago, was a women's tennis tournament played on outdoor clay courts at the Lake Bluff Bath & Tennis Club in Chicago, Illinois in the United States that was part of the 1971 WT Pro Tour. It was the inaugural edition of the tournament and was held from August 19 through August 22, 1971. Third-seeded Françoise Dürr won the singles title and earned $4,100 first-prize money.

== Finals ==
=== Singles ===
(France) Françoise Dürr defeated (United States) Billie Jean King 6–4, 6–2

=== Doubles ===
(Australia) Judy Dalton / (France) Françoise Dürr defeated (United States) Rosemary Casals / (United States) Billie Jean King 6–4, 7–6

== Prize money ==
Event	W	F	3rd	4th	QF	Round of 16
Singles	$4,100	$2,700	$1,800	$1,500	$800	$400
