= 1971 Billie Jean King Invitational – Singles =

Singles
- 1971 Billie Jean King Invitational

Final
- Champion: (United States) Billie Jean King
- Runner-up: (United States) Rosie Casals
- Score: 6–1, 6–2

Details
- Draw: 16
- Seeds: 4

Events
Singles	Doubles
WTA Los Angeles	· 1972 →

16 players played in the first edition of the Billie Jean King Invitational which would later become the LA Women's Tennis Championships. In the final it was top seed Billie Jean King who won 6–1, 6–2 against Rosie Casals who she played against in the previous week.

== Draw ==
=== Key ===
- Q = Qualifier
- WC = Wild card
- LL = Lucky loser
- Alt = Alternate
- SE = Special exempt
- PR = Protected ranking
- ITF = ITF entry
- JE = Junior exempt
- w/o = Walkover
- r = Retired
- d = Defaulted
- SR = Special ranking

First round
1	(United States) B Jean King	4	7^{5}	6
(France) F Dürr	6	6^{4}	1
(United States) S Johnson	6	6
(United States) D Hard	1	3
(United States) V Ziegenfuss	7^{5}	6
(Australia) J Tegart Dalton	6^{1}	1
(Australia) K Melville	3	2
3	(United Kingdom) A Jones	6	6
4	(United States) N Richey	6	6
(United States) K Pigeon	3	3
(United States) D Carter	6	6
(United States) B Hansen	1	4
(United States) M Ann Eisel	6	7
(United States) J Bartkowicz	4	5
2	(United States) R Casals	7^{5}	6
(Australia) K Krantzcke	6^{1}	2

Quarterfinals
1	(United States) B Jean King	6	6
(United States) S Johnson	3	4
(Australia) K Melville	1	0
3	(United Kingdom) A Jones	6	6
4	(United States) N Richey	6	6
(United States) D Carter	3	3
(United States) M Ann Eisel	4	4
2	(United States) R Casals	6	6

Semifinals
1	(United States) B Jean King	6	6
3	(United Kingdom) A Jones	2	0
4	(United States) N Richey	3	1
2	(United States) R Casals	6	6

Final
1	(United States) B Jean King	6	6
2	(United States) R Casals	1	2
