= 1971 BMC Invitational – Singles =

Singles
- 1971 BMC Invitational

Final
- Champion: (United States) Billie Jean King
- Runner-up: (United States) Rosie Casals
- Score: 6–3, 6–4

Details
- Draw: 16
- Seeds: 4

Events
Singles	Doubles
BMC Invitational	· 1972 →

The 1971 BMC Invitational – Singles was an event of the 1971 BMC Invitational women's tennis tournament and was played on indoor carpet courts at the Civic Auditorium in San Francisco, California in the United States between January 6 and January 9, 1971. The draw comprised 16 players of which 4 were seeded. First-seeded Billie Jean King won the singles title by defeating second-seeded Rosie Casals in the final, 6–3, 6–4.

Ann Jones defeated Nancy Richey 6–4, 6–4 in the third place play-off.

== Draw ==
=== Key ===
- Q = Qualifier
- WC = Wild card
- LL = Lucky loser
- Alt = Alternate
- SE = Special exempt
- PR = Protected ranking
- ITF = ITF entry
- JE = Junior exempt
- w/o = Walkover
- r = Retired
- d = Defaulted
- SR = Special ranking

First round
1	(United States) B Jean King	6	6
(South Africa) E Emmanuel	2	3
(France) F Dürr	6	7
(Australia) J Tegart Dalton	2	5
(Australia) K Melville	6	6
(United States) D Hard	2	4
4	(United Kingdom) A Jones	6	6
(United States) K Pigeon	4	3
3	(United States) N Richey	6	6
(United States) V Ziegenfuss	1	2
(United States) P Bartkowicz	6	6
(United States) D Carter-Triolo	3	4
(United States) M Ann Eisel	6	6
(United States) S Johnson	2	2
2	(United States) R Casals	6	6
(Australia) K Krantzcke	2	0

Quarterfinals
1	(United States) B Jean King	3	7	6
(France) F Dürr	6	5	1
(Australia) K Melville	3	0
4	(United Kingdom) A Jones	6	6
3	(United States) N Richey	6	4	6
(United States) P Bartkowicz	2	6	0
(United States) M Ann Eisel	2	3
2	(United States) R Casals	6	6

Semifinals
1	(United States) B Jean King	6	6
4	(United Kingdom) A Jones	0	0
3	(United States) N Richey	4	5
2	(United States) R Casals	6	7

Final
1	(United States) B Jean King	6	6
2	(United States) R Casals	3	4
