= 1971 Clean Air Classic =

- Date: February 9–14
- Edition: 1st
- Draw: 32S / 16D
- Prize money: $30,000
- Surface: Carpet / indoor
- Location: Hawthorne, New Jersey, US; New York City, New York US

Champions

Singles
- (Socialist Federal Republic of Yugoslavia) Željko Franulović

Doubles
- (Spain) Juan Gisbert, Sr. / (Spain) Manuel Orantes
Clean Air Classic	· 1972 →

The 1971 Clean Air Classic was a men's tennis tournament that took place in Hawthorne, New Jersey and New York in the United States that was part of the 1971 USLTA Indoor Circuit. It was the inaugural edition of the event and was held from February 9 through February 14, 1971. Željko Franulović won the singles titles.

== Finals ==
=== Singles ===
(Socialist Federal Republic of Yugoslavia) Željko Franulović defeated (United States) Clark Graebner 6–2, 5–7, 6–4, 7–5

=== Doubles ===
(Spain) Juan Gisbert, Sr. / (Spain) Manuel Orantes defeated (United States) Jimmy Connors / (Pakistan) Haroon Rahim 7–6, 6–2
