= Madison Square Garden Open Tennis Championship =

Defunct tennis tournament
- Event name: Madison Square Open Tennis Championship (1968-70)
- Tour: ILTF World Circuit (1968–70)
- Founded: 1968; 58 years ago
- Abolished: 1970; 56 years ago
- Location: New York City, United States
- Venue: Madison Square Garden
- Surface: Carpet indoors

The Madison Square Garden Open Tennis Championship also known as the Madison Square Garden Challenge Trophy and New York Indoor was a men's and women's open international indoor carpet court tennis tournament founded in 1968. It was organised by the USNLTA and played at Madison Square Garden, New York City, United States, until 1970. This international tournament was part of the ILTF World Circuit until 1970, when it was replaced by the Clean Air Classic.

== History ==
On 25 March 1968, the Madison Square Open Tennis Championship was established. The tournament was organised by the USLTA and was played on indoor carpet courts. The first two editions were played in the standard tournament format; the 1970 and final edition was played as a round-robin tournament with a third and fourth place play-off, then a final.

In 1971 the owners of Madison Square Garden chose not to renew the tournament and the US tennis Association looked for a replacement New York Indoor event, they approached Combustion Equipment Associates Inc to sponsor a new event, which led to the Clean Air Classic that would be played across three venues in Hawthorne, New Jersey and the Vanderbilt International Racquet Club, culminating in the final at the Seventh Regiment Armory.

== Finals ==
=== Men' singles ===
(incomplete roll)

Year	Winners	Runners-up	Score
1968	(United States) Arthur Ashe	(Australia) Roy Emerson	6-4, 6–4, 7–5.
1969	(Spain) Andrés Gimeno	(United States) Arthur Ashe	6-1, 6–2, 3–6, 6–8, 9–7.
1970	(Spain) Manuel Santana	(United States) Stan Smith	6-4, 6–2.

=== Women's singles ===
(incomplete roll)

Year	Winners	Runners-up	Score
1968	(United States) Nancy Richey	(Australia) Judy Tegart	7-5, 7–5.
