= 1972 Independent Press-Telegram Championships =

- Date: January 19–23
- Edition: 2nd
- Category: WT Pro Tour
- Draw: 16S / ?D
- Prize money: $17,000
- Surface: Carpet (Sportface) / indoor
- Location: Long Beach, California, U.S.
- Venue: Long Beach City College Gym

Champions

Singles
- (United States) Rosie Casals

Doubles
- (United States) Rosie Casals / (United Kingdom) Virginia Wade
- Virginia Slims of Los Angeles

The 1972 Independent Press-Telegram Championships was a women's tennis tournament played on indoor carpet courts at the Long Beach City College Gym in Long Beach, California in the United States that was part of the 1972 WT Pro Tour. It was the second edition of the tournament and was held from January 19 through January 13, 1972. A capacity crowd of 2,200 spectators watched second-seeded Rosie Casals win the singles title and earn $3,400 first-prize money.

== Finals ==
=== Singles ===
(United States) Rosie Casals defeated (France) Françoise Dürr 6–2, 6–7^{(4–5)}, 6–3

=== Doubles ===
(United States) Rosie Casals / (United Kingdom) Virginia Wade defeated (Australia) Helen Gourlay / (Australia) Karen Krantzcke 6–4, 5–7, 7–5

== Prize money ==
Event	W	F	3rd	4th	QF	Round of 16
Singles	$3,400	$2,200	$1,500	$1,200	$700	$350
