= 1974 French Open – Women's singles qualifying =

Women's singles qualifying
- 1974 French Open

Events
Singles	men	women		boys	girls
Doubles	men	women	mixed	boys	girls
WC Singles	men	women	quad
WC Doubles	men	women	quad
Legends	−45	45+	women
← 1973 ·	French Open	· 1975 →

Players who neither had high enough rankings nor received wild cards to enter the main draw of the annual French Open Tennis Championships participated in a qualifying tournament held in the week before the event.

== Qualifiers ==
1. (Czechoslovakia) Mirka Koželuhová
2. (Romania) Virginia Ruzici
3. (Romania) Mariana Simionescu
4. (France) Christine Gimmig
5. (Spain) Vicky Baldovinos
6. (Czechoslovakia) Regina Maršíková
7. (Chile) Ana María Arias
8. (United States) Patty Ann Reese

== Lucky losers ==
1. (United States) Daryl Gralka
2. (Italy) Antonella Rosa
3. (France) Nicole Bîmes
4. (United States) Betsy Nagelsen

== Qualifying draw ==
=== Key ===
- Q = Qualifier
- WC = Wild card
- LL = Lucky loser
- Alt = Alternate
- ITF = ITF entry
- PR = Protected ranking
- SR = Special ranking
- SE = Special exempt
- JE = Junior exempt
- JR = Junior Accelerator Programme entrant
- CO = College Accelerator Programme entrant
- NG = Next Gen Accelerator Program entrant
- w/o = Walkover
- r = Retired
- d = Defaulted

=== First qualifier ===
First round
1	(Czechoslovakia) Mirka Koželuhová	6	6
8	(France) Huguette Barat	2	1
4	(Australia) Jenny Walker
5	(Austria) Sonja Pachta	w/o
2	(Italy) Silvana Belardinelli	3	6	6
7	(France) Michele Mizen	6	3	4
3	(United States) Betsy Nagelsen	6	6
6	(Spain) Carmen Perea	1	3

Second round
(Czechoslovakia) Mirka Koželuhová
(Australia) Jenny Walker	w/o
(Italy) Silvana Belardinelli	1	4
(United States) Betsy Nagelsen	6	6

Qualifying competition
(Czechoslovakia) Mirka Koželuhová	6	6
(United States) Betsy Nagelsen	1	3

=== Second qualifier ===
First round
1	(Romania) Virginia Ruzici	6	6
8	(United States) Bunny Smith	3	4
4	(West Germany) Marketa Wallenfels	6	6
5	(Japan) Hideko Goto	3	3
2	(France) Marie-Christine Brochard
7	(Hungary) Beatrix Klein	w/o
3	(United States) Joy Schwikert
6	(West Germany) Susanne Korpas	w/o

Second round
(Romania) Virginia Ruzici	6	6
(West Germany) Marketa Wallenfels	3	1
(France) Marie-Christine Brochard	7	3	1
(United States) Joy Schwikert	6	6	6

Qualifying competition
(Romania) Virginia Ruzici	6	6
(United States) Joy Schwikert	3	1

=== Third qualifier ===
First round
1	(Japan) Naoko Sato	6	6
8	(France) Frédérique Thibault	3	3
4	(South Africa) Karin Boshoff
5	(France) Dominique Beillan	w/o
2	(United States) D. Jainer
7	(United States) K. Bluhm	w/o
3	(Romania) Mariana Simionescu	7	7
6	(France) Martine Le Rays	6	6

Second round
(Japan) Naoko Sato	6	1	6
(South Africa) Karin Boshoff	3	6	3
(United States) D. Jainer	w/o
(Romania) Mariana Simionescu

Qualifying competition
(Japan) Naoko Sato	3	1
(Romania) Mariana Simionescu	6	6

=== Fourth qualifier ===
First round
1	(United States) B. Dalzell
8	(Australia) Norma Eastburn	w/o
4	(France) Christine Gimmig
5	(United States) J. James	w/o
2	(Hungary) Erzsébet Széll	6	6
7	(Chile) Michelle Rodríguez	3	0
3	(France) Nicole Bîmes
6	(United States) R. Witeker	w/o

Second round
(United States) B. Dalzell	2	1
(France) Christine Gimmig	6	6
(Hungary) Erzsébet Széll	4	6	2
(France) Nicole Bîmes	6	4	6

Qualifying competition
(France) Christine Gimmig	0	6	6
(France) Nicole Bîmes	6	3	2

=== Fifth qualifier ===
First round
1	(France) Brigitte Simon
8	(Australia) Chris O'Neil	w/o
4	(Spain) Vicky Baldovinos
5	(Ecuador) María Eugenia Guzmán	w/o
2	(Italy) Antonella Rosa	6	6
7	(Brazil) L. Rios De Almeida	2	0
3	(Hungary) Erzsébet Polgár
6	(Italy) Monique Di Maso	w/o

Second round
(France) Brigitte Simon	w/o
(Spain) Vicky Baldovinos
(Italy) Antonella Rosa	6	1	6
(Hungary) Erzsébet Polgár	2	6	4

Qualifying competition
(Spain) Vicky Baldovinos	6	6
(Italy) Antonella Rosa	4	4

=== Sixth qualifier ===
First round
1	(France) Anne-Marie Rouchon	6	6
8	(Brazil) Vera-Lúcia Cleto	2	3
4	(Czechoslovakia) Regina Maršíková	2	6	3
5	(Austria) Maria Hollingsworth	6	3	0^{r}
2	(United States) Jill Schwikert	6	6
7	(Japan) Meiko Miyashita	3	3
3	(France) Maylis Burel
6	(Australia) Mandy Morgan	w/o

Second round
(France) Anne-Marie Rouchon	1	1
(Czechoslovakia) Regina Maršíková	6	6
(United States) Jill Schwikert	4	4
(France) Maylis Burel	6	6

Qualifying competition
(Czechoslovakia) Regina Maršíková	6	6
(France) Maylis Burel	4	3

=== Seventh qualifier ===
First round
1	(United States) Daryl Gralka	6	6
8	(France) Patricia Rime	1	4
4	(Australia) Sue Hastings	6	6
5	(Italy) Laura Falconieri	0	1
2	(France) Élisabeth Du Fresne-Girard
7	(Romania) Florența Mihai	w/o
3	(Chile) Ana María Arias
6	(Hungary) Ágnes Graczol	w/o

Second round
(United States) Daryl Gralka	6	6
(Australia) Sue Hastings	4	4
(France) Élisabeth Du Fresne-Girard	2	3
(Chile) Ana María Arias	6	6

Qualifying competition
(United States) Daryl Gralka	3	7	4
(Chile) Ana María Arias	6	6	6

=== Eighth qualifier ===
First round
1	(Sweden) Helena Anliot	6	6
8	(France) Catherine De Lorme	2	1
4	(Australia) Pam Whytcross
5	(Italy) Rosalba Vido	w/o
2	(United States) Patty Ann Reese	6	6
7	(Switzerland) Marianne Kindler	0	3
3	(Hungary) Katalin Borka
6	(Poland) Barbara Kral	w/o

Second round
(Sweden) Helena Anliot
(Australia) Pam Whytcross	w/o
(United States) Patty Ann Reese
(Hungary) Katalin Borka	w/o

Qualifying competition
(Sweden) Helena Anliot	3	1
(United States) Patty Ann Reese	6	6
