= 1973 French Open – Women's singles qualifying =

Women's singles qualifying
- 1973 French Open

Events
Singles	men	women		boys	girls
Doubles	men	women	mixed	boys	girls
WC Singles	men	women	quad
WC Doubles	men	women	quad
Legends	−45	45+	women

Qualification
Singles	men	women
- French Open

Players who neither had high enough rankings nor received wild cards to enter the main draw of the annual French Open Tennis Championships participated in a qualifying tournament held in the week before the event.

== Qualifiers ==
1. (France) Danièle Bouteleux
2. (Rhodesia) Daphne Pattison
3. (United States) Patricia Bostrom
4. (Spain) Carmen Perea
5. (Sweden) Mimmi Wikstedt
6. (Italy) Daniela Porzio
7. (France) Rosie Reyes
8. (United States) Joy Schwikert

== Lucky losers ==
1. (Chile) Carmen Ibarra

== Qualifying draw ==
Key

- Q = Qualifier
- WC = Wild card
- LL = Lucky loser
- Alt = Alternate
- ITF = ITF entry
- PR = Protected ranking
- SR = Special ranking
- SE = Special exempt
- JE = Junior exempt
- JR = Junior Accelerator Programme entrant
- CO = College Accelerator Programme entrant
- NG = Next Gen Accelerator Program entrant
- w/o = Walkover
- r = Retired
- d = Defaulted

=== First qualifier ===
First round

Second round
(France) Danièle Bouteleux
(France) Anne-Marie Rouchon	w/o
(Czechoslovakia) Mirka Koželuhová
(France) Christiane Sarrazin	w/o

Qualifying competition
(France) Danièle Bouteleux	6	4
(Czechoslovakia) Mirka Koželuhová	3	3^{r}

=== Second qualifier ===
First round

Second round
(Rhodesia) Daphne Pattison	6	6
(France) Chantal Puget	1	1
(France) Brigitte Simon	7	0	6
(Japan) Kayoko Fukuoka	5	6	4

Qualifying competition
(Rhodesia) Daphne Pattison	6	3	6
(France) Brigitte Simon	4	6	2

=== Third qualifier ===
First round
4	(Argentina) Elvira Weisenberger	6	7
5	(Mexico) Gina Díaz-Ponce	3	6
3	(West Germany) Susanne Korpas	7	6
6	(Chile) Michelle Rodríguez	5	1

Second round
(United States) Patricia Bostrom	6	6
(Argentina) Elvira Weisenberger	1	3
(France) Michele Mizen	7	6
(West Germany) Susanne Korpas	5	3

Qualifying competition
(United States) Patricia Bostrom	6	6
(France) Michele Mizen	3	0

=== Fourth qualifier ===
First round
1	(Spain) Carmen Perea	6	6
8	(Japan) Naoko Sato	4	4
4	(Costa Rica) Monica Rho	6	6
5	(France) Dominique Beillan	3	1
3	(Chile) Ana María Arias	6	7	6
6	(South Korea) Lee Mi-ok	7	5	3

Second round
(Spain) Carmen Perea	6	6
(Costa Rica) Monica Rho	4	4
(France) Anne-Marie Cassaigne	6	6
(Chile) Ana María Arias	4	4

Qualifying competition
(Spain) Carmen Perea	6	6
(France) Anne-Marie Cassaigne	3	2

=== Fifth qualifier ===
First round
2	(Japan) Hideko Goto	6	6
7	(France) Nicole Bîmes	2	1
3	(South Korea) Lee Duk-hee	6	7	7
6	(Australia) Cynthia Doerner	7	6	5

Second round
(Sweden) Mimmi Wikstedt	6	6
(Austria) Maria Hollingsworth	0	1
(Japan) Hideko Goto	6	4	6
(South Korea) Lee Duk-hee	2	6	1

Qualifying competition
(Sweden) Mimmi Wikstedt	6	0
(Japan) Hideko Goto	2	6^{r}

=== Sixth qualifier ===
First round
1	(Italy) Daniela Porzio	6	6
8	(France) Jacqueline Le Boubenec	0	3

Second round
(Italy) Daniela Porzio	4	6	6
(Belgium) Monique Van Haver	6	1	3
(France) Florence Guédy	7	6
(Brazil) Andrea Menezes	6	2

Qualifying competition
(Italy) Daniela Porzio	6	6	2
(France) Florence Guédy	1	7	1^{r}

=== Seventh qualifier ===
First round
1	(France) Rosie Reyes	6	6
8	(Hungary) Erzsébet Polgár	1	2
4	(United States) Bunny Smith	3	1
5	(Argentina) Ines Roget	6	6

Second round
(France) Rosie Reyes	6	6
(Argentina) Ines Roget	3	2
(South Korea) Lee Soon-oh	6	6	6
(France) Sylvie Pruvot	4	7	2

Qualifying competition
(France) Rosie Reyes	6	0	6
(South Korea) Lee Soon-oh	1	6	1

=== Eighth qualifier ===
First round
4	(New Zealand) Marilyn Pryde	2	6	6
5	(France) Évelyne Terras	6	4	1
2	(Chile) Carmen Ibarra	6	6
7	(Spain) Estela Benavides	3	3
3	(Mexico) Maria-Teresa Salvidea-Diaz	7	6
6	(United States) J. Ray	5	1

Second round
(United States) Joy Schwikert	6	6
(New Zealand) Marilyn Pryde	4	4
(Chile) Carmen Ibarra	6	0	7
(Mexico) Maria-Teresa Salvidea-Diaz	2	6	5

Qualifying competition
(United States) Joy Schwikert	6	4	6
(Chile) Carmen Ibarra	3	6	3
