= 1977 Federation Cup (tennis) =

International women's tennis competition

Details
- Duration: 13 – 18 June
- Edition: 15th

Champion
- Winning nation: United States

The 1977 Federation Cup was the 15th edition of the most important competition between national teams in women's tennis. The tournament was held at Devonshire Park Lawn Tennis Club in Eastbourne, United Kingdom, from 13–18 June. The United States defended their title, defeating Australia in their seventh final.

== Participating teams ==
Participating Teams
Argentina	Australia	Austria	Belgium	Brazil	Canada	Chile	Chinese Taipei
Denmark	Finland	France	Great Britain	Greece	India	Indonesia	Ireland
Israel	Japan	Luxembourg	Mexico	Netherlands	New Zealand	Norway	Portugal
South Africa	South Korea	Spain	Sweden	Switzerland	United States	Uruguay	West Germany

== Draw ==
All ties were played at Devonshire Park in Eastbourne, United Kingdom, on grass courts.|}

First Round
United States	3
Austria	0
Switzerland	2
Norway	1
Greece	3
Portugal	0
France	3
Luxembourg	0
Belgium	1
New Zealand	2
South Africa	2
Japan	1
Israel
India	w/o
Uruguay	0
Netherlands	3
Great Britain	3
Denmark	0
Mexico	1
South Korea	2
Finland	0
Sweden	3
Argentina	2
Chile	1
West Germany	3
Spain	0
Ireland	0
Canada	3
Chinese Taipei	0
Brazil	3
Indonesia	0
Australia	3

Second Round
United States	3
Switzerland	0
Greece	0
France	3
New Zealand	0
South Africa	3
Israel	0
Netherlands	3
Great Britain	3
South Korea	0
Sweden	3
Argentina	0
West Germany	3
Canada	0
Brazil	0
Australia	3

Quarterfinals
United States	3
France	0
South Africa	2
Netherlands	1
Great Britain	3
Sweden	0
West Germany	1
Australia	2

Semifinals
United States	3
South Africa	0
Great Britain	1
Australia	2

Final
United States	2
Australia	1

1st and 2nd Round losing teams play in Consolation rounds

=== First round ===
==== United States vs. Austria ====
United States
3
Devonshire Park, Eastbourne, United Kingdom
June 1977
Grass (outdoors)

Austria
0

			1	2	3
1	(United States) (Austria)	Chris Evert; Sabine Bernegger	6; 0	6; 0
2	(United States) (Austria)	Billie Jean King; Helena Wimmer	6; 2	6; 2
3	(United States) (Austria)	Rosemary Casals / Chris Evert; Sabine Bernegger / Helena Wimmer	6; 0	6; 1

==== Switzerland vs. Norway ====
Switzerland
2
Devonshire Park, Eastbourne, United Kingdom
June 1977
Grass (outdoors)

Norway
1

			1	2	3
1	(Switzerland) (Norway)	Anne-Marie Rüegg; Kirsten Robsahm	6; 4	8; 6
2	(Switzerland) (Norway)	Petra Delhees; Ellen Grindvold	6; 4	6; 2
3	(Switzerland) (Norway)	Christiane Jolissaint / Monica Simmen; Ellen Grindvold / Kirsten Robsahm	2; 6	4; 6

==== Greece vs. Portugal ====
Greece
3
Devonshire Park, Eastbourne, United Kingdom
June 1977
Grass (outdoors)

Portugal
0

			1	2	3
1	(Greece) (Portugal)	Denise Panagopoulou; Graça Cardoso	6; 3	3; 6	6; 1
2	(Greece) (Portugal)	Dionissia Asteri; Conceição Rio	6; 1	6; 3
3	(Greece) (Portugal)	Dionissia Asteri / Dionissia Kotsia; Manuel Maria Cabral Lencastre / Graça Cardoso	6; 4	6; 4

- Denise Panagopoulou, who defeated Graça Cardoso in the first rubber, holds the Fed Cup record for the youngest player at 12 years and 360 days (although players must now be aged 14 years or older).

==== France vs. Luxembourg ====
France
3
Devonshire Park, Eastbourne, United Kingdom
June 1977
Grass (outdoors)

Luxembourg
0

			1	2	3
1	(France) (Luxembourg)	Frédérique Thibault; Danielle Meunier	6; 0	6; 1
2	(France) (Luxembourg)	Françoise Dürr; Flore Wagner	6; 0	6; 1
3	(France) (Luxembourg)	Françoise Dürr / Gail Benedetti; Danielle Meunier / Flore Wagner	6; 0	6; 0

==== Belgium vs. New Zealand ====
Belgium
1
Devonshire Park, Eastbourne, United Kingdom
June 1977
Grass (outdoors)

New Zealand
2

			1	2	3
1	(Belgium) (New Zealand)	Monique Van Haver; Pauline Elliott	5; 7	4; 6
2	(Belgium) (New Zealand)	Michele Gurdal; Judy Chaloner	4; 6	6; 2	8; 6
3	(Belgium) (New Zealand)	Michele Gurdal / Monique Van Haver; Pauline Elliott / Chris Newton	4; 6	5; 7

==== South Africa vs. Japan ====
South Africa
2
Devonshire Park, Eastbourne, United Kingdom
June 1977
Grass (outdoors)

Japan
1

			1	2	3
1	(South Africa) (Japan)	Linky Boshoff; Kimiyo Yagahara	6; 0	6; 1
2	(South Africa) (Japan)	Brigitte Cuypers; Naoko Sato	4; 6	10; 8	4; 6
3	(South Africa) (Japan)	Linky Boshoff / Ilana Kloss; Kayoko Fukuoka / Naoko Cato	6; 2	6; 4

==== Uruguay vs. Netherlands ====
Uruguay
0
Devonshire Park, Eastbourne, United Kingdom
June 1977
Grass (outdoors)

Netherlands
3

			1	2	3
1	(Uruguay) (Netherlands)	Carla Guarino de Galeazzi; Elly Appel	0; 6	1; 6
2	(Uruguay) (Netherlands)	Fiorella Bonicelli; Betty Stöve	3; 6	2; 6
3	(Uruguay) (Netherlands)	Fiorella Bonicelli / Carla Guarino de Galeazzi; Betty Stöve / Elly Appel	0; 6	2; 6

==== Great Britain vs. Denmark ====
Great Britain
3
Devonshire Park, Eastbourne, United Kingdom
June 1977
Grass (outdoors)

Denmark
0

			1	2	3
1	(United Kingdom) (Denmark)	Sue Barker; Dorte Ekner	6; 3	6; 1
2	(United Kingdom) (Denmark)	Virginia Wade; Helle Sparre	6; 4	6; 2
3	(United Kingdom) (Denmark)	Sue Barker / Virginia Wade; Dorte Ekner / Helle Sparre	6; 2	6; 2

==== Mexico vs. South Korea ====
Mexico
1
Devonshire Park, Eastbourne, United Kingdom
June 1977
Grass (outdoors)

South Korea
2

			1	2	3
1	(Mexico) (South Korea)	Alina Baraldi; Choi Kyeong-mi	5; 7	1; 6
2	(Mexico) (South Korea)	Alejandra Vallejo; Lee Duk-hee	3; 6	3; 6
3	(Mexico) (South Korea)	Alina Baraldi / Alejandra Vallejo; Kim Nam-sook / Helen Park	9; 7	4; 6	7; 5

==== Finland vs. Sweden ====
Finland
0
Devonshire Park, Eastbourne, United Kingdom
June 1977
Grass (outdoors)

Sweden
3

			1	2	3
1	(Finland) (Sweden)	Laila Pirilä; Margareta Forsgårdh	6; 3	0; 6	1; 6
2	(Finland) (Sweden)	Elina Durchman; Ingrid Bentzer	3; 6	2; 6
3	(Finland) (Sweden)	Elina Durchman / Laila Pirilä; Helena Anliot / Mimmi Wikstedt	0; 6	2; 6

==== Argentina vs. Chile ====
Argentina
2
Devonshire Park, Eastbourne, United Kingdom
June 1977
Grass (outdoors)

Chile
1

			1	2	3
1	(Argentina) (Chile)	Viviana González; Leyla Musalem	6; 0	4; 6	3; 6
2	(Argentina) (Chile)	Raquel Giscafré; Silvana Urroz	6; 4	4; 6	6; 4
3	(Argentina) (Chile)	Raquel Giscafré / Elvira Weisenberger; Patricia Rivera / Silvana Urroz	6; 0	6; 2

==== West Germany vs. Spain ====
West Germany
3
Devonshire Park, Eastbourne, United Kingdom
June 1977
Grass (outdoors)

Spain
0

			1	2	3
1	(West Germany) (Spain)	Katja Ebbinghaus; Vicky Baldovinos	6; 3	6; 0
2	(West Germany) (Spain)	Helga Masthoff; Carmen Perea	6; 1	6; 8	6; 4
3	(West Germany) (Spain)	Katja Ebbinghaus / Helga Masthoff; Mónica Álvarez de Mon / Carmen Mandarino	6; 3	6; 2

==== Ireland vs. Canada ====
Ireland
0
Devonshire Park, Eastbourne, United Kingdom
June 1977
Grass (outdoors)

Canada
3

			1	2	3
1	(Republic of Ireland) (Canada)	Geraldine Barniville; Barbara Brankovska	0; 6	2; 6
2	(Republic of Ireland) (Canada)	Helen Lennon; Marjorie Blackwood	1; 6	0; 6
3	(Republic of Ireland) (Canada)	Margaret Burns / Helen Lennon; Marjorie Blackwood / Lisette Senn	2; 6	0; 6

==== Chinese Taipei vs. Brazil ====
Chinese Taipei
0
Devonshire Park, Eastbourne, United Kingdom
June 1977
Grass (outdoors)

Brazil
3

			1	2	3
1	(Chinese Taipei) (Brazil)	Ku Liu-shang; Maria Bueno	0; 6	0; 6
2	(Chinese Taipei) (Brazil)	Lee Hsiu; Patricia Medrado	1; 6	0; 6
3	(Chinese Taipei) (Brazil)	Lee Hsiu / Ku Liu-shang; Vera Lúcia Giugni / Patricia Medrado	0; 6	0; 6

==== Indonesia vs. Australia ====
Indonesia
0
Devonshire Park, Eastbourne, United Kingdom
June 1977
Grass (outdoors)

Australia
3

			1	2	3
1	(Indonesia) (Australia)	Sriningdiah Sutarniati; Dianne Fromholtz	0; 6	0; 6
2	(Indonesia) (Australia)	Yolanda Soemarno; Kerry Reid	0; 6	1; 6
3	(Indonesia) (Australia)	Elfia Nizarwan / Sriningdiah Sutarniati; Kerry Reid / Wendy Turnbull	1; 6	1; 6

=== Second round ===
==== United States vs. Switzerland ====
United States
3
Devonshire Park, Eastbourne, United Kingdom
June 1977
Grass (outdoors)

Switzerland
0

			1	2	3
1	(United States) (Switzerland)	Chris Evert; Anne-Marie Rüegg	6; 3	6; 0
2	(United States) (Switzerland)	Billie Jean King; Christiane Jolissaint	6; 0	6; 3
3	(United States) (Switzerland)	Rosemary Casals / Chris Evert; Petra Delhees / Monica Simmen	6; 0	7; 5

==== Greece vs. France ====
Greece
3
Devonshire Park, Eastbourne, United Kingdom
June 1977
Grass (outdoors)

France
0

			1	2	3
1	(Greece) (France)	Denise Panagopoulou; Brigitte Simon	0; 6	0; 6
2	(Greece) (France)	Dionissia Asteri; Françoise Dürr	1; 6	1; 6
3	(Greece) (France)	Dionissia Asteri / Dionissia Kotsia; Françoise Dürr / Gail Benedetti	2; 6	2; 6

==== New Zealand vs. South Africa ====
New Zealand
0
Devonshire Park, Eastbourne, United Kingdom
June 1977
Grass (outdoors)

South Africa
3

			1	2	3
1	(New Zealand) (South Africa)	Pauline Elliott; Greer Stevens	2; 6	1; 6
2	(New Zealand) (South Africa)	Judy Chaloner; Brigitte Cuypers	2; 6	2; 6
3	(New Zealand) (South Africa)	Pauline Elliott / Chris Newton; Linky Boshoff / Ilana Kloss	0; 6	5; 7

==== Israel vs. Netherlands ====
Israel
0
Devonshire Park, Eastbourne, United Kingdom
June 1977
Grass (outdoors)

Netherlands
3

			1	2	3
1	(Israel) (Netherlands)	Hagit Zubary; Elly Appel	1; 6	1; 6
2	(Israel) (Netherlands)	Paulina Peled; Betty Stöve	1; 6	1; 6
3	(Israel) (Netherlands)	Paulina Peled / Hagit Zubary; Betty Stöve / Elly Appel	2; 6	1; 6

==== Great Britain vs. South Korea ====
Great Britain
3
Devonshire Park, Eastbourne, United Kingdom
June 1977
Grass (outdoors)

South Korea
0

			1	2	3
1	(United Kingdom) (South Korea)	Sue Barker; Choi Kyeong-mi	6; 1	6; 3
2	(United Kingdom) (South Korea)	Virginia Wade; Lee Duk-hee	6; 1	6; 0
3	(United Kingdom) (South Korea)	Sue Barker / Virginia Wade; Choi Kyeong-mi / Lee Duk-hee	6; 1	6; 0

==== Sweden vs. Argentina ====
Sweden
3
Devonshire Park, Eastbourne, United Kingdom
June 1977
Grass (outdoors)

Argentina
0

			1	2	3
1	(Sweden) (Argentina)	Mimmi Wikstedt; Elvira Weisenberger	6; 4	6; 4
2	(Sweden) (Argentina)	Ingrid Bentzer; Raquel Giscafré	6; 0	6; 4
3	(Sweden) (Argentina)	Helena Anliot / Mimmi Wikstedt; Beatriz Araujo / Viviana González	6; 3	6; 3

==== West Germany vs. Canada ====
West Germany
3
Devonshire Park, Eastbourne, United Kingdom
June 1977
Grass (outdoors)

Canada
0

			1	2	3
1	(West Germany) (Canada)	Katja Ebbinghaus; Barbara Brankovska	6; 4	6; 4
2	(West Germany) (Canada)	Helga Masthoff; Marjorie Blackwood	6; 0	6; 4
3	(West Germany) (Canada)	Katja Ebbinghaus / Helga Masthoff; Marjorie Blackwood / Lisette Senn	6; 3	6; 3

==== Brazil vs. Australia ====
Brazil
0
Devonshire Park, Eastbourne, United Kingdom
June 1977
Grass (outdoors)

Australia
3

			1	2	3
1	(Brazil) (Australia)	Patricia Medrado; Dianne Fromholtz	8; 10	4; 6
2	(Brazil) (Australia)	Maria Bueno; Kerry Reid	1; 6	2; 6
3	(Brazil) (Australia)	Vera Lúcia Giugni / Patricia Medrado; Kerry Reid / Wendy Turnbull	2; 6	1; 6

=== Quarterfinals ===
==== United States vs. France ====
United States
3
Devonshire Park, Eastbourne, United Kingdom
June 1977
Grass (outdoors)

France
0

			1	2	3
1	(United States) (France)	Billie Jean King; Frédérique Thibault	6; 0	6; 0
2	(United States) (France)	Chris Evert; Françoise Dürr	6; 1	6; 3
3	(United States) (France)	Rosemary Casals / Chris Evert; Françoise Dürr / Gail Benedetti	6; 3	7; 5

==== South Africa vs. Netherlands ====
South Africa
2
Devonshire Park, Eastbourne, United Kingdom
June 1977
Grass (outdoors)

Netherlands
1

			1	2	3
1	(South Africa) (Netherlands)	Greer Stevens; Elly Appel	6; 0	6; 1
2	(South Africa) (Netherlands)	Brigitte Cuypers; Betty Stöve	2; 6	1; 6
3	(South Africa) (Netherlands)	Linky Boshoff / Ilana Kloss; Betty Stöve / Elly Appel	6; 1	6; 3

==== Great Britain vs. Sweden ====
Great Britain
3
Devonshire Park, Eastbourne, United Kingdom
June 1977
Grass (outdoors)

Sweden
0

			1	2	3
1	(United Kingdom) (Sweden)	Sue Barker; Mimmi Wikstedt	6; 2	6; 0
2	(United Kingdom) (Sweden)	Virginia Wade; Ingrid Bentzer	7; 5	6; 2
3	(United Kingdom) (Sweden)	Sue Barker / Virginia Wade; Helena Anliot / Mimmi Wikstedt	6; 2	5; 7	6; 3

==== West Germany vs. Australia ====
West Germany
1
Devonshire Park, Eastbourne, United Kingdom
June 1977
Grass (outdoors)

Australia
2

			1	2	3
1	(West Germany) (Australia)	Katja Ebbinghaus; Dianne Fromholtz	4; 6	6; 0	6; 4
2	(West Germany) (Australia)	Helga Masthoff; Kerry Reid	3; 6	4; 6
3	(West Germany) (Australia)	Katja Ebbinghaus / Helga Masthoff; Kerry Reid / Wendy Turnbull	6; 2	3; 6	3; 6

=== Semifinals ===
==== United States vs. South Africa ====
United States
3
Devonshire Park, Eastbourne, United Kingdom
June 1977
Grass (outdoors)

South Africa
0

			1	2	3
1	(United States) (South Africa)	Billie Jean King; Greer Stevens	6; 2	6; 0
2	(United States) (South Africa)	Chris Evert; Brigitte Cuypers	6; 1	6; 1
3	(United States) (South Africa)	Rosemary Casals / Chris Evert; Linky Boshoff / Ilana Kloss	6; 0	3; 6	9; 7

==== Great Britain vs. Australia ====
Great Britain
1
Devonshire Park, Eastbourne, United Kingdom
June 1977
Grass (outdoors)

Australia
2

			1	2	3
1	(United Kingdom) (Australia)	Sue Barker; Dianne Fromholtz	3; 6	4; 6
2	(United Kingdom) (Australia)	Virginia Wade; Kerry Reid	4; 6	4; 6
3	(United Kingdom) (Australia)	Sue Barker / Virginia Wade; Kerry Reid / Wendy Turnbull	6; 1	6; 4

=== Final ===
==== United States vs. Australia ====
United States
2
Devonshire Park Lawn Tennis Club, Eastbourne, United Kingdom
18 June 1977
Grass (outdoors)

Australia
1

			1	2	3
1	(United States) (Australia)	Billie Jean King; Dianne Fromholtz	6; 1	2; 6	6; 2
2	(United States) (Australia)	Chris Evert; Kerry Reid	7; 5	6; 3
3	(United States) (Australia)	Rosemary Casals / Chris Evert; Kerry Reid / Wendy Turnbull	3; 6	3; 6

1977 Federation Cup Champions
(United States)
United States
Sixth title

== Consolation rounds ==
=== Draw ===
Consolation first round
Italy	2
Mexico	1
Chinese Taipei	0
Uruguay	3
Indonesia	1
Norway	2
Portugal	0
Japan	3
Ireland	0
South Korea	3
Brazil	0
Canada	3
New Zealand	1
Switzerland	2

Consolation second round
Belgium	2
Spain	1
Chile	1
Argentina	2
Denmark	2
Italy	1
Uruguay	2
Norway	1
Japan	2
South Korea	1
Canada	2
Switzerland	1
Greece	0
Finland	3
Luxembourg	0
Israel	3

Consolation quarterfinals
Belgium	2
Argentina	1
Denmark	2
Uruguay	1
Japan	2
Canada	1
Finland	1
Israel	2

Consolation semifinals
Belgium	0
Denmark	3
Japan	2
Israel	0

Consolation final
Denmark	3
Japan	0

=== First round ===
==== Italy vs. Mexico ====
Italy
2
Devonshire Park, Eastbourne, United Kingdom
June 1977
Grass (outdoors)

Mexico
1

			1	2	3
1	(Italy) (Mexico)	Manuela Zoni; Alina Baraldi	4; 6	6; 3	6; 0
2	(Italy) (Mexico)	Daniela Marzano; Alejandra Vallejo	6; 2	6; 2
3	(Italy) (Mexico)	Évelyne Terras / Manuela Zoni; Alina Baraldi / Susana Rojas	4; 6	7; 9

==== Chinese Taipei vs. Uruguay ====
Chinese Taipei
0
Devonshire Park, Eastbourne, United Kingdom
June 1977
Grass (outdoors)

Uruguay
3

			1	2	3
1	(Chinese Taipei) (Uruguay)	Lee Hsiu; Carla Guarino de Galeazzi	0; 6	2; 6
2	(Chinese Taipei) (Uruguay)	Ku Liu-shang; Fiorella Bonicelli	0; 6	0; 6
3	(Chinese Taipei) (Uruguay)	Ku Liu-shang / Lee Hsiu; Fiorella Bonicelli / Carla Guarino de Galeazzi	0; 6	0; 6

==== Indonesia vs. Norway ====
Indonesia
1
Devonshire Park, Eastbourne, United Kingdom
June 1977
Grass (outdoors)

Norway
2

			1	2	3
1	(Indonesia) (Norway)	Elfia Nizarwan; Bente Kjolstad	6; 4	6; 2
2	(Indonesia) (Norway)	Yolanda Soemarno; Ellen Grindvold	4; 6	0; 6
3	(Indonesia) (Norway)	Elfia Nizarwan / Sriningdiah Sutarniati; Ellen Grindvold / Kirsten Robsahm	5; 7	3; 6

==== Portugal vs. Japan ====
Portugal
0
Devonshire Park, Eastbourne, United Kingdom
June 1977
Grass (outdoors)

Japan
3

			1	2	3
1	(Portugal) (Japan)	Graça Cardoso; Kimiyo Yagahara	0; 6	2; 6
2	(Portugal) (Japan)	Conceição Rio; Naoko Sato	3; 6	0; 6
3	(Portugal) (Japan)	Manuel Maria Cabral Lencastre / Graça Cardoso; Kayoko Fukuoka / Kimiyo Yagahara	1; 6	0; 6

==== Ireland vs. South Korea ====
Ireland
0
Devonshire Park, Eastbourne, United Kingdom
June 1977
Grass (outdoors)

South Korea
3

			1	2	3
1	(Republic of Ireland) (South Korea)	Louise Tuff; Choi Kyeong-mi	1; 6	2; 6
2	(Republic of Ireland) (South Korea)	Helen Lennon; Lee Duk-hee	1; 6	2; 6
3	(Republic of Ireland) (South Korea)	Margaret Burns / Helen Lennon; Lee Duk-hee / Helen Park	2; 6	1; 6

==== Brazil vs. Canada ====
Brazil
0
Devonshire Park, Eastbourne, United Kingdom
June 1977
Grass (outdoors)

Canada
3

			1	2	3
1	(Brazil) (Canada)	Vera Lúcia Giugni; Lisette Senn	8; 10	3; 6
2	(Brazil) (Canada)	Patricia Medrado; Marjorie Blackwood	3; 6	6; 4	1; 6
3	(Brazil) (Canada)	Vera Lúcia Giugni / Patricia Medrado; Barbara Brankovska / Lisette Senn	3; 6	2; 6

==== New Zealand vs. Switzerland ====
New Zealand
1
Devonshire Park, Eastbourne, United Kingdom
June 1977
Grass (outdoors)

Switzerland
2

			1	2	3
1	(New Zealand) (Switzerland)	Chris Newton; Anne-Marie Rüegg	3; 6	3; 6
2	(New Zealand) (Switzerland)	Judy Chaloner; Monica Simmen	7; 9	7; 5	6; 3
3	(New Zealand) (Switzerland)	Judy Chaloner / Chris Newton; Petra Delhees / Anne-Marie Rüegg	1; 6	10; 8	3; 6

=== Second round ===
==== Belgium vs. Spain ====
Belgium
2
Devonshire Park, Eastbourne, United Kingdom
June 1977
Grass (outdoors)

Spain
1

			1	2	3
1	(Belgium) (Spain)	Monique Van Haver; Vicky Baldovinos	3; 6	4; 6
2	(Belgium) (Spain)	Michele Gurdal; Carmen Perea	3; 0			retired
3	(Belgium) (Spain)	Michele Gurdal / Monique Van Haver; Vicky Baldovinos / Carmen Mandarino	8; 6	3; 6	6; 1

==== Chile vs. Argentina ====
Chile
1
Devonshire Park, Eastbourne, United Kingdom
June 1977
Grass (outdoors)

Argentina
2

			1	2	3
1	(Chile) (Argentina)	Leyla Musalem; Viviana González	6; 4	7; 5
2	(Chile) (Argentina)	Silvana Urroz; Raquel Giscafré	3; 6	6; 4	3; 6
3	(Chile) (Argentina)	Leyla Musalem / Silvana Urroz; Raquel Giscafré / Elvira Weisenberger	6; 2	4; 6	3; 6

==== Denmark vs. Italy ====
Denmark
2
Devonshire Park, Eastbourne, United Kingdom
June 1977
Grass (outdoors)

Italy
1

			1	2	3
1	(Denmark) (Italy)	Dorte Ekner; Manuela Zoni	6; 2	4; 6	6; 4
2	(Denmark) (Italy)	Helle Sparre; Daniela Marzano	6; 3	6; 4
3	(Denmark) (Italy)	Dorte Ekner / Birgitte Hermansen; Daniela Marzano / Rosalba Vido	4; 6	0; 6

==== Uruguay vs. Norway ====
Uruguay
2
Devonshire Park, Eastbourne, United Kingdom
June 1977
Grass (outdoors)

Norway
1

			1	2	3
1	(Uruguay) (Norway)	Carla Guarino de Galeazzi; Kirsten Robsahm	0; 6	0; 6
2	(Uruguay) (Norway)	Fiorella Bonicelli; Ellen Grindvold	6; 1	6; 3
3	(Uruguay) (Norway)	Fiorella Bonicelli / Carla Guarino de Galeazzi; Ellen Grindvold / Kirsten Robsahm	6; 3	6; 4

==== Japan vs. South Korea ====
Japan
2
Devonshire Park, Eastbourne, United Kingdom
June 1977
Grass (outdoors)

South Korea
1

			1	2	3
1	(Japan) (South Korea)	Kimiyo Yagahara; Lee Duk-hee	6; 2	7; 5
2	(Japan) (South Korea)	Naoko Sato; Kim Nam-sook	4; 6	4; 6
3	(Japan) (South Korea)	Kayoko Fukuoka / Kimiyo Yagahara; Lee Duk-hee / Helen Park	6; 2	6; 4

==== Canada vs. Switzerland ====
Canada
2
Devonshire Park, Eastbourne, United Kingdom
June 1977
Grass (outdoors)

Switzerland
1

			1	2	3
1	(Canada) (Switzerland)	Lisette Senn; Petra Delhees	4; 6	6; 4	4; 6
2	(Canada) (Switzerland)	Marjorie Blackwood; Monica Simmen	2; 6	6; 0	8; 6
3	(Canada) (Switzerland)	Marjorie Blackwood / Barbara Brankovska; Petra Delhees / Anne-Marie Rüegg	8; 6	4; 6	12; 10

==== Greece vs. Finland ====
Greece
0
Devonshire Park, Eastbourne, United Kingdom
June 1977
Grass (outdoors)

Finland
3

			1	2	3
1	(Greece) (Finland)	Denise Panagopoulou; Laila Pirilä	6; 3	3; 6	1; 6
2	(Greece) (Finland)	Dionissia Asteri; Elina Durchman	0; 6	2; 6
3	(Greece) (Finland)	Dionissia Asteri / Dionissia Kotsia; Elina Durchman / Laila Pirilä	1; 6	2; 6

==== Luxembourg vs. Israel ====
Luxembourg
0
Devonshire Park, Eastbourne, United Kingdom
June 1977
Grass (outdoors)

Israel
3

			1	2	3
1	(Luxembourg) (Israel)	Brigitte Lorang; Hagit Zubary	0; 6	4; 6
2	(Luxembourg) (Israel)	Flore Wagner; Paulina Peled	1; 6	1; 6
3	(Luxembourg) (Israel)	Danielle Meunier / Flore Wagner; Tamar Levin / Hagit Zubary	3; 6	1; 6

=== Quarterfinals ===
==== Belgium vs. Argentina ====
Belgium
2
Devonshire Park, Eastbourne, United Kingdom
June 1977
Grass (outdoors)

Argentina
1

			1	2	3
1	(Belgium) (Argentina)	Marianne De Crop; Elvira Weisenberger	4; 6	2; 6
2	(Belgium) (Argentina)	Michele Gurdal; Viviana González	6; 0	6; 2
3	(Belgium) (Argentina)	Michele Gurdal / Monique Van Haver; Beatriz Araujo / Elvira Weisenberger	7; 5	6; 4

==== Denmark vs. Uruguay ====
Denmark
2
Devonshire Park, Eastbourne, United Kingdom
June 1977
Grass (outdoors)

Uruguay
1

			1	2	3
1	(Denmark) (Uruguay)	Dorte Ekner; Carla Guarino de Galeazzi	6; 3	6; 1
2	(Denmark) (Uruguay)	Helle Sparre; Fiorella Bonicelli	1; 6	6; 4	0; 6
3	(Denmark) (Uruguay)	Dorte Ekner / Helle Sparre; Fiorella Bonicelli / Carla Guarino de Galeazzi	6; 2	6; 1

==== Japan vs. Canada ====
Japan
2
Devonshire Park, Eastbourne, United Kingdom
June 1977
Grass (outdoors)

Canada
1

			1	2	3
1	(Japan) (Canada)	Kimiyo Yagahara; Lisette Senn	6; 4	6; 4
2	(Japan) (Canada)	Naoko Sato; Marjorie Blackwood	2; 6	5; 7
3	(Japan) (Canada)	Kayoko Fukuoka / Kimiyo Yagahara; Marjorie Blackwood / Lisette Senn	6; 1	6; 2

==== Finland vs. Israel ====
Finland
1
Devonshire Park, Eastbourne, United Kingdom
June 1977
Grass (outdoors)

Israel
2

			1	2	3
1	(Finland) (Israel)	Laila Pirilä; Hagit Zubary	4; 6	6; 4	5; 7
2	(Finland) (Israel)	Elina Durchman; Paulina Peled	0; 6	2; 6
3	(Finland) (Israel)	Elina Durchman / Laila Pirilä; Tamar Levin / Hagit Zubary	6; 0	10; 8

=== Semifinals ===
==== Belgium vs. Denmark ====
Belgium
0
Devonshire Park, Eastbourne, United Kingdom
June 1977
Grass (outdoors)

Denmark
3

			1	2	3
1	(Belgium) (Denmark)	Monique Van Haver; Dorte Ekner	4; 6	6; 8
2	(Belgium) (Denmark)	Michele Gurdal; Helle Sparre	4; 6	3; 6
3	(Belgium) (Denmark)	Michele Gurdal / Monique Van Haver; Dorte Ekner / Helle Sparre	3; 6	4; 6

==== Japan vs. Israel ====
Japan
2
Devonshire Park, Eastbourne, United Kingdom
June 1977
Grass (outdoors)

Israel
0

			1	2	3
1	(Japan) (Israel)	Kimiyo Yagahara; Hagit Zubary	6; 2	2; 6	6; 2
2	(Japan) (Israel)	Naoko Sato; Paulina Peled	6; 1	9; 7
3	(Japan) (Israel)

=== Final ===
==== Denmark vs. Japan ====
Denmark
3
Devonshire Park, Eastbourne, United Kingdom
June 1977
Grass (outdoors)

Japan
0

			1	2	3
1	(Denmark) (Japan)	Dorte Ekner; Kimiyo Yagahara	6; 3	4; 6	9; 7
2	(Denmark) (Japan)	Helle Sparre; Naoko Sato	6; 2	6; 3
3	(Denmark) (Japan)	Dorte Ekner / Helle Sparre; Kayoko Fukuoka / Kimiyo Yagahara	3; 6	6; 0	6; 0
