= 1974 Wimbledon Championships – Women's singles qualifying =

Women's singles qualifying
- 1974 Wimbledon Championships

Events
Singles	men	women		boys	girls
Doubles	men	women	mixed	boys	girls
WC Singles	men	women	quad
WC Doubles	men	women	quad
Legends	men	women	seniors

Qualification
Singles	men	women
Doubles	men	women	mixed
- Wimbledon Championships

Players who neither had high enough rankings nor received wild cards to enter the main draw of the annual Wimbledon Tennis Championships participated in a qualifying tournament held one week before the event.

== Qualifiers ==
1. (Australia) Christine Mattison
2. (United States) Patricia Bostrom
3. (Sweden) Helena Anliot
4. (United States) Sally Greer
5. (United States) Robin Tenney
6. (Australia) Chris O'Neil
7. (Australia) Nerida Gregory
8. (Socialist Federal Republic of Yugoslavia) Mima Jaušovec

== Lucky losers ==
1. (Netherlands) Elly Appel-Vessies
2. (United States) Sue Stap
3. (Netherlands) Tine Zwaan

== Qualifying draw ==
Key

- Q = Qualifier
- WC = Wild card
- LL = Lucky loser
- Alt = Alternate
- ITF = ITF entry
- PR = Protected ranking
- SR = Special ranking
- SE = Special exempt
- JE = Junior exempt
- JR = Junior Accelerator Programme entrant
- CO = College Accelerator Programme entrant
- NG = Next Gen Accelerator Program entrant
- w/o = Walkover
- r = Retired
- d = Defaulted

=== First qualifier ===
First round
1	(Australia) Christine Mattison	6	6
8	(Australia) Nora Eastburn	1	2
4	(Japan) Kayoko Fukuoka	6	2	12
5	(United Kingdom) Judy Congdon	4	6	10
2	(United States) Janet Haas	6	6	6
7	(Denmark) Anne-Mette Sørensen	8	4	0
3	(New Zealand) Judy Connor	6	6
6	(United Kingdom) Frances Candy	3	2

Second round
(Australia) Christine Mattison	6	6
(Japan) Kayoko Fukuoka	3	1
(United States) Janet Haas	7	6
(New Zealand) Judy Connor	5	4

Qualifying competition
(Australia) Christine Mattison	6	6
(United States) Janet Haas	4	4

=== Second qualifier ===
First round
1	(United States) Patricia Bostrom	6	6
8	(Zimbabwe) S.E. Page	3	0
4	(United Kingdom) Wendy Slaughter	7	4	6
5	(Netherlands) Nora Lauteslager	5	6	4
2	(Netherlands) Elly Appel-Vessies	6	6
7	(Spain) Carmen Perea-Alcala	4	2
3	(United States) Terry Holladay	6	3	6
6	(Republic of Ireland) Sue Minford	3	6	3

Second round
(United States) Patricia Bostrom	6	7
(United Kingdom) Wendy Slaughter	1	5
(Netherlands) Elly Appel-Vessies	6	0	7
(United States) Terry Holladay	3	6	5

Qualifying competition
(United States) Patricia Bostrom	4	6	6
(Netherlands) Elly Appel-Vessies	6	1	3

=== Third qualifier ===
First round
1	(Sweden) Helena Anliot	4	7	8
8	(United States) Daryl Gralka	6	5	6
4	(United Kingdom) Nuala Dwyer	6	6
5	(Australia) Patricia Coleman	4	3
2	(Belgium) Monique Van Haver	4	7	6
7	(Indonesia) Lita Liem Sugiarto	6	5	2
3	(United States) J. Schwikert	6	2	6
6	(United Kingdom) Belinda Thompson	0	6	2

Second round
(Sweden) Helena Anliot	6	7
(United Kingdom) Nuala Dwyer	1	5
(Belgium) Monique Van Haver	7	1	6
(United States) J. Schwikert	5	6	2

Qualifying competition
(Sweden) Helena Anliot	6	6
(Belgium) Monique Van Haver	3	2

=== Fourth qualifier ===
First round
1	(United States) Sally Greer	6	6
8	(United Kingdom) Diane Riste	4	0
4	(United States) Patty Ann Reese	6	6
5	(Switzerland) Marianne Kindler	1	2
2	(Australia) Mandy Morgan	6	6
7	(Germany) Heidi Eisterlehner	3	4
3	(United States) Sue Stap	6	8	8
6	(Denmark) Helle Sparre	3	9	6

Second round
(United States) Sally Greer	6	3	6
(United States) Patty Ann Reese	2	6	4
(Australia) Mandy Morgan	9	6
(United States) Sue Stap	8	2

Qualifying competition
(United States) Sally Greer	6	6
(Australia) Mandy Morgan	4	4

=== Fifth qualifier ===
First round
1	(United States) Robin Tenney	6	5	6
8	(Italy) Anna-Maria Nasuelli	3	7	4
4	(Australia) Jenny Dimond	6	6
5	(Costa Rica) Monica Rho	0	1
2	(United States) Ceci Martinez	6	6
7	(United Kingdom) Linda Geeves	0	0
3	(South Africa) Gwynn Sammel	6	6
6	(Norway) Bente Kjolstad	3	3

Second round
(United States) Robin Tenney	4	6	6
(Australia) Jenny Dimond	6	0	0
(United States) Ceci Martinez	6	6
(South Africa) Gwynn Sammel	2	1

Qualifying competition
(United States) Robin Tenney	1	6	11
(United States) Ceci Martinez	6	3	9

=== Sixth qualifier ===
First round
1	(Australia) Chris O'Neil	6	6
8	(Australia) E.M. Worner	2	3
4	(Australia) Pam Whytcross	2	7	6
5	(United States) Susan Hagey	6	5	3
2	(United States) Nancy Ornstein	5	6	6
7	(Australia) Jenny Walker	7	4	3
3	(South Africa) L. Raymond	6	6
6	(United Kingdom) R.E. Pearson	0	2

Second round
(Australia) Chris O'Neil	6	6
(Australia) Pam Whytcross	3	3
(United States) Nancy Ornstein	6	6
(South Africa) L. Raymond	3	4

Qualifying competition
(Australia) Chris O'Neil	6	6
(United States) Nancy Ornstein	3	3

=== Seventh qualifier ===
First round
1	(Australia) Nerida Gregory	6	1	6
8	(United Kingdom) Jenny Helliar	1	6	0
4	(Argentina) Daria Kopsic	6	9
5	(United States) Tam O'Shaughnessy	3	8
2	(Australia) Diane Eastburn	5	6	6
7	(New Zealand) Beverley Vercoe	7	4	3
3	(United States) J. Schwikert	5	6	6
6	(France) Florence Guédy	7	3	3

Second round
(Australia) Nerida Gregory	6	6
(Argentina) Daria Kopsic	2	2
(Australia) Diane Eastburn	6	6
(United States) J. Schwikert	1	2

Qualifying competition
(Australia) Nerida Gregory	6	6
(Australia) Diane Eastburn	4	1

=== Eighth qualifier ===
First round
1	(Socialist Federal Republic of Yugoslavia) Mima Jaušovec	6	6
8	(United Kingdom) Binnie Blackburn	0	2
4	(Japan) Naoko Sato	9	6
5	(Australia) Gwen Stirton	7	2
2	(Netherlands) Tine Zwaan	6	6
7	(Republic of Ireland) Geraldine Barniville	3	4
3	(Finland) Laila Pirila	6	6
6	(United Kingdom) Julia Potterton	4	3

Second round
(Socialist Federal Republic of Yugoslavia) Mima Jaušovec	6	6
(Japan) Naoko Sato	4	1
(Netherlands) Tine Zwaan	6	6
(Finland) Laila Pirila	3	0

Qualifying competition
(Socialist Federal Republic of Yugoslavia) Mima Jaušovec	6	6
(Netherlands) Tine Zwaan	2	1
