= 1974 Australian Open – Women's doubles =

Women's doubles
- 1974 Australian Open

Final
- Champions: (Australia) Evonne Goolagong (United States) Peggy Michel
- Runners-up: (Australia) Kerry Harris (Australia) Kerry Melville
- Score: 7–5, 6–3

Details
- Draw: 32
- Seeds: 4

Events
Singles	men	women		boys	girls
Doubles	men	women	mixed	boys	girls
WC Singles	men	women	quad
WC Doubles	men	women	quad
Legends	men	women	mixed
- Australian Open

Margaret Court and Virginia Wade were the reigning champions. They did not compete to defend their titles.

== Seeds ==
1. (Australia) Kerry Harris / (Australia) Kerry Melville (final)
2. (Australia) Evonne Goolagong / (United States) Peggy Michel (champions)
3. (Australia) Lesley Hunt / (Australia) Janet Young (semifinals)
4. (Australia) Judy Dalton / (United States) Julie Heldman (semifinals)

== Draw ==
Key

- Q = Qualifier
- WC = Wild card
- LL = Lucky loser
- Alt = Alternate
- ITF = ITF entry
- PR = Protected ranking
- SR = Special ranking
- SE = Special exempt
- JE = Junior exempt
- JR = Junior Accelerator Programme entrant
- CO = College Accelerator Programme entrant
- NG = Next Gen Accelerator Program entrant
- w/o = Walkover
- r = Retired
- d = Defaulted

=== Finals ===
Semifinals
1	(Australia) Kerry Harris (Australia) Kerry Melville	6	6
4	(Australia) Judy Dalton (United States) Julie Heldman	3	4
3	(Australia) Lesley Hunt (Australia) Janet Young
2	(Australia) Evonne Goolagong (United States) Peggy Michel	w/o

Final
1	(Australia) Kerry Harris (Australia) Kerry Melville	5	3
2	(Australia) Evonne Goolagong (United States) Peggy Michel	7	6

=== Top half ===
First round
1	(Australia) K Harris (Australia) K Melville	w/o
(Australia) D Eastburn (Australia) N Eastburn
(Australia) K Hogarth (Australia) C Matison	7	3	1
(Australia) C O'Neil (Australia) K Ruddell	6	6	6
(United Kingdom) S Barker (United Kingdom) L Beaven	6	6
(Australia) B Dale (Japan) K Nomura	3	2
(Australia) J Fallis (Australia) L Raymond	4	3
(Sweden) H Anliot (Sweden) I Larsson	6	6
(United States) J Newberry (United States) P Teeguarden	6	7
(Australia) F Candy (United Kingdom) J Griffiths	2	5
(Australia) H Gourlay (Australia) K Krantzcke	6	6
(United Kingdom) J Fayter (Australia) M Tesch	4	0
(Australia) K Chute (Australia) V Lancaster	6	6
(Australia) W Paish (Hungary) K Szeman	1	0
(Australia) M Morgan (Australia) P Whytcross	3	3
4	(Australia) J Dalton (United States) J Heldman	6	6

Second round
1	(Australia) K Harris (Australia) K Melville	6	6
(Australia) C O'Neil (Australia) K Ruddell	2	3
(United Kingdom) S Barker (United Kingdom) L Beaven	6	6
(Sweden) H Anliot (Sweden) I Larsson	4	3
(United States) J Newberry (United States) P Teeguarden	6	5
(Australia) H Gourlay (Australia) K Krantzcke	7	7
(Australia) K Chute (Australia) V Lancaster	2	4
4	(Australia) J Dalton (United States) J Heldman	6	6

Quarterfinals
1	(Australia) K Harris (Australia) K Melville	7	7
(United Kingdom) S Barker (United Kingdom) L Beaven	5	6
(Australia) H Gourlay (Australia) K Krantzcke	3	4
4	(Australia) J Dalton (United States) J Heldman	6	6

Semifinals
1	(Australia) K Harris (Australia) K Melville	6	6
4	(Australia) J Dalton (United States) J Heldman	3	4

=== Bottom half ===
First round
3	(Australia) L Hunt (Australia) J Young	6	6
(Australia) C Cerato (Australia) G Williams	1	1
(Australia) J Glynn (Australia) M Liddle	4	2
(United States) C Hillebrand (Australia) L Nette	6	6
(United States) Ji Schwikert (United States) Jo Schwikert	7	6
(Australia) B Hawcroft (Australia) J O'Neill	6	1
(Japan) T Sade (Japan) M Yokobori	1	2
(Australia) P Coleman (Australia) W Turnbull	6	6
(United States) A Kiyomura (Japan) K Sawamatsu	6	7
(Australia) J Forbes (Australia) C Germaine	1	6
(Sweden) M Strandberg (Sweden) M Wikstedt	4	1
(Australia) J Dimond (Australia) D Fromholtz	6	6
(Netherlands) N Lauteslager (Sweden) S Lundgren	4	3
(Australia) J Walker (Australia) K Walker	6	6
(Netherlands) N Brouwer (Netherlands) A Schothurst	1	1
2	(Australia) E Goolagong (United States) P Michel	6	6

Second round
3	(Australia) L Hunt (Australia) J Young	6	6
(United States) C Hillebrand (Australia) L Nette	3	0
(United States) Ji Schwikert (United States) Jo Schwikert	7	1	10
(Australia) P Coleman (Australia) W Turnbull	6	6	8
(United States) A Kiyomura (Japan) K Sawamatsu	6	7
(Australia) J Dimond (Australia) D Fromholtz	1	6
(Australia) J Walker (Australia) K Walker	0	2
2	(Australia) E Goolagong (United States) P Michel	6	6

Quarterfinals
3	(Australia) L Hunt (Australia) J Young	6	6
(United States) Ji Schwikert (United States) Jo Schwikert	3	4
(United States) A Kiyomura (Japan) K Sawamatsu	4	4
2	(Australia) E Goolagong (United States) P Michel	6	6

Semifinals
3	(Australia) L Hunt (Australia) J Young
2	(Australia) E Goolagong (United States) P Michel	w/o
