= Schwikert =

Schwikert is the surname of the following notable people:

- Jill Schwikert (born 1954), American tennis player
- Joy Schwikert (born 1954), American tennis player, twin sister of Jill
- Tasha Schwikert (born 1984), American gymnast, daughter of Joy
