= Tournoi de La Châtaigneraie =

Defunct tennis tournament
- Tour: ILTF World Open Circuit (1968–72); ILTF Independent Circuit (1973–83)
- Founded: 1968; 58 years ago
- Abolished: 1984; 42 years ago
- Location: La Châtaigneraie, France
- Venue: Tennis Club la Chataigneraie
- Surface: Clay indoors / outdoors

The Tournoi de La Châtaigneraie or the La Chataigneraie Tournament was a men's and women's open international indoor and outdoor clay court tennis tournament founded in 1968. Also referred to in the English press as the La Châtaigneraie Covered Courts it was organised by the Tennis Club la Chataigneraie and played at La Châtaigneraie, France until 1983. The tournament was part ILTF European Circuit a sub circuit of the ILTF World Open Circuit until 1972, then became part of the ILTF Independent Circuit until 1984 when it was discontinued.

== History ==
In 1964 a French business couple purchased a 1 hectare plot of land in Montgermont in La Châtaigneraie, France and built 4 clay courts, 3 outdoors and one indoors, thus the Tennis Club de la Châtaigneraie was founded. In 1968 an international men's and women's open tennis event the Tournoi de La Châtaigneraie was established. This event was played on both indoor and outdoor clay courts early rounds where weather permitting. The tournament was staged as part of ILTF European Circuit a regional subsidiary circuit of the ILTF World Open Circuit until 1972, In 1973 it became part of the ILTF Independent Circuit, the same year a second indoor clay court was constructed. It continued to be held annual until 1984 when it was discontinued. In 1989 the club built third indoor clay court.

== Finals ==
=== Men's singles ===
(incomplete roll)

Year	Champions	Runners-up	Score
↓ ILTF World Circuit ↓
1968	(France) Michel Leclercq	(France) Alain Bouteleux	5-7, 6–1, 6–1.
↓ Open era ↓
1969	(Iran) Mohammad Hossein Akbari	(Brazil) Thomaz Koch	4–6, 6–3, 6–3.
1970	(France) Patrick Proisy	(France) Michel Leclercq	6–3, 6–4.
1971	(France) Jean Paul Meyer	(Romania) Codin Dumitrescu	6–2, 6–2.
1972	(France) Jean-Claude Barclay	(Romania) Sever Mureșan	6–2, 6–3.
↓ ILTF Independent Tour ↓
1974	(France) Jean-Claude Barclay	(France) Jean-François Caujolle	7–5, 6–4.
1979	(France) Éric Deblicker	(Sweden) Kjell Johansson	2–6, 6–3, 6–3.
1982	(Iran) Mansour Bahrami	(France) François Jauffret	4–6, 6–4, 6–1.
1983	(Monaco) Bernard Balleret	(France) Paul Torre	6–1, 6–1.
1984	(France) Herve Gauvain	(France) Paul Torre	6–4, 6–4.

=== Women's singles ===
(incomplete roll)

Year	Champions	Runners-up	Score
↓ ILTF World Circuit ↓
1968	(France) Rosie Reyes Darmon	(Spain) Maria-Jose Aubet	8–6, 6–2
↓ Open era ↓
1969	(Belgium) Ingrid Palmieri	(Argentina) Mabel Vrancovich	6–4, 2–6, 6–4
1970	(France) Gail Chanfreau	(France) Danièle Bouteleux	7–5, 7–5
1972	(France) Rosie Reyes Darmon	(France) Anne-Marie Rouchon	6–1, 6–1
↓ ILTF Independent Tour ↓
1973	(Italy) Antonella Rosa	(France) Odile de Roubin	6–4, 6–4
1974	(France) Odile de Roubin	(France) Nicole Bimes	6–2, 7–6
