= 1974 French Open – Women's singles =

Women's singles
- 1974 French Open

Final
- Champion: (United States) Chris Evert
- Runner-up: (Soviet Union) Olga Morozova
- Score: 6–1, 6–2

Details
- Draw: 64
- Seeds: 8

Events
Singles	men	women		boys	girls
Doubles	men	women	mixed	boys	girls
WC Singles	men	women	quad
WC Doubles	men	women	quad
Legends	−45	45+	women
- French Open

Chris Evert defeated Olga Morozova in the final, 6–1, 6–2 to win the women's singles tennis title at the 1974 French Open. It was her first major singles title, the first of an eventual record seven French Open women's singles titles, and the first of an eventual 18 major singles titles. Evert did not lose a set during the tournament. Evert and Morozova also won the women's doubles title together.

Margaret Court was the reigning champion, but chose not to defend her title due to her third pregnancy.

== Seeds ==
The seeded players are listed below. Chris Evert is the champion; others show the round in which they were eliminated.

1. (United States) Chris Evert (champion)
2. (United Kingdom) Virginia Wade (second round)
3. (Soviet Union) Olga Morozova (finalist)
4. (West Germany) Helga Masthoff (semifinals)
5. (South Africa) Pat Pretorius Walkden Withdrew
6. (Czechoslovakia) Martina Navrátilová (quarterfinals)
7. (Japan) Kazuko Sawamatsu (first round)
8. (United States) Julie Heldman (quarterfinals)

== Draw ==
=== Key ===
- Q = Qualifier
- WC = Wild card
- LL = Lucky loser
- r = Retired

=== Finals ===
Quarterfinals
1	(United States) Chris Evert	6	7
8	(United States) Julie Heldman	0	5
4	(West Germany) Helga Masthoff	7	6
5	(Czechoslovakia) Martina Navrátilová	6	3
(Czechoslovakia) Marie Neumannová	3	2
3	(Soviet Union) Olga Morozova	6	6
(West Germany) Katja Ebbinghaus	5	7	3
(Argentina) Raquel Giscafré	7	6	6

Semifinals
1	(United States) Chris Evert	7	6
4	(West Germany) Helga Masthoff	5	4
3	(Soviet Union) Olga Morozova	6	6
(Argentina) Raquel Giscafré	3	2

Finals
1	(United States) Chris Evert	6	6
3	(Soviet Union) Olga Morozova	1	2

=== Earlier rounds ===
==== Section 1 ====
First round
Q	(Czechoslovakia) Maršíková	1	4
1	(United States) Evert	6	6
LL	(United States) Nagelsen	3	6	2
Q	(Romania) Ruzici	6	3	6
(Italy) Di Maso	6	6	4
(Australia) Paish	3	7	6
(United Kingdom) Moor	2	2
Q	(Spain) Baldovinos	6	6
(Czechoslovakia) Palmeová-West	1	1
8	(United States) Heldman	6	6
(France) Chanfreau	1	6	6
Q	(Czechoslovakia) Koželuhová	6	2	8
Q	(Chile) Pinto Bravo	2	7	3
(United States) L Tenney	6	5	6
(Sweden) Wikstedt	3	2
(United States) Reese	6	6

Second round
1	(United States) Evert	6	6
Q	(Romania) Ruzici	2	3
(Australia) Paish	2	1
Q	(Spain) Baldovinos	6	6
8	(United States) Heldman	7	6
Q	(Czechoslovakia) Koželuhová	6	1
(United States) L Tenney	6	6	6
(United States) Reese	7	4	1

Third round
1	(United States) Evert	6	6
Q	(Spain) Baldovinos	2	2
8	(United States) Heldman	6	6
(United States) L Tenney	2	2

Quarterfinals
1	(United States) Evert	6	7
8	(United States) Heldman	0	5

==== Section 2 ====
First round
(France) Darmon	4	6
4	(West Germany) Masthoff	6	7
(Japan) Fukuoka	1	6	0
(France) Bouteleux	6	4	6
(Australia) Matison	2	6	3
Q	(Romania) Simionescu	6	2	6
(United Kingdom) Blachford	0	2
(Argentina) Weisenberger	6	6
(United States) R Tenney	4	3
5	(Czechoslovakia) Navratilova	6	6
(Belgium) Gurdal	2	2
(United Kingdom) Burton	6	6
(Italy) Pericoli	3	1
(Sweden) Sandberg	6	6
(France) de Roubin	3	6	5
(Australia) Fromholtz	6	4	7

Second round
4	(West Germany) Masthoff	6	3	6
(France) Bouteleux	1	6	1
Q	(Romania) Simionescu	5	7	5
(Argentina) Weisenberger	7	5	7
5	(Czechoslovakia) Navratilova	7	6
(United Kingdom) Burton	6	2
(Sweden) Sandberg	3	5
(Australia) Fromholtz	6	7

Third round
4	(West Germany) Masthoff	6	6
(Argentina) Weisenberger	4	1
5	(Czechoslovakia) Navratilova	6	3	6
(Australia) Fromholtz	2	6	3

Quarterfinals
4	(West Germany) Masthoff	7	6
5	(Czechoslovakia) Navratilova	6	3

==== Section 3 ====
First round
LL	(France) Bîmes	0	0
(Czechoslovakia) Neumannová	6	6
(United States) Chang	2	1
(United Kingdom) Fayter	6	6
(Netherlands) Schaar	6	3
(Italy) Nasuelli	7	6
LL	(Italy) Rosa	3	6	6
LL	(United States) Gralka	6	3	8
(Costa Rica) Rho	1	2
(Romania) Gohn	6	6
Q	(France) Gimmig	2	6	4
(United Kingdom) Molesworth	6	2	6
(United Kingdom) Beaven	2	4
(France) Guédy	6	6
(Czechoslovakia) Tomanová	4	2
3	(Soviet Union) Morozova	6	6

Second round
(Czechoslovakia) Neumannová	6	6
(United Kingdom) Fayter	3	4
(Italy) Nasuelli	6	6
LL	(United States) Gralka	2	1
(Romania) Gohn	6	6
(United Kingdom) Molesworth	0	3
(France) Guédy	1	0
3	(Soviet Union) Morozova	6	6

Third round
(Czechoslovakia) Neumannová	6	6
(Italy) Nasuelli	3	0
(Romania) Gohn	4	2
3	(Soviet Union) Morozova	6	6

Quarterfinals
(Czechoslovakia) Neumannová	3	2
3	(Soviet Union) Morozova	6	6

==== Section 4 ====
First round
(South Africa) Boshoff	6	5	5
(West Germany) Orth	3	7	7
(United States) Haas	5	0
(Indonesia) Sugiarto	7	6
(United States) Ornstein	4	5
(West Germany) Ebbinghaus	6	7
7	(Japan) Sawamatsu	6	3
(Socialist Federal Republic of Yugoslavia) Jaušovec	7	6
(Indonesia) Kaligis	7	1	3
(United Kingdom) Coles	6	6	6
(Italy) Papale	6	0
(Argentina) Giscafré	7	6
(United States) Greer	4	3
(France) Fuchs	6	6
(Belgium) Van Haver	2	2
2	(United Kingdom) Wade	6	6

Second round
(West Germany) Orth	1	5
(Indonesia) Sugiarto	6	7
(West Germany) Ebbinghaus	6	7
(Socialist Federal Republic of Yugoslavia) Jaušovec	3	6
(United Kingdom) Coles	1	6
(Argentina) Giscafré	6	7
(France) Fuchs	7	6
2	(United Kingdom) Wade	5	4

Third round
(Indonesia) Sugiarto	3	6
(West Germany) Ebbinghaus	6	7
(Argentina) Giscafré	6	6
(France) Fuchs	4	3

Quarterfinals
(West Germany) Ebbinghaus	7	6	6
(Argentina) Giscafré	5	7	3

Preceded by 1974 Australian Open – Women's singles	Grand Slam women's singles	Succeeded by 1974 Wimbledon Championships – Women's singles
