= Joy Schwikert =

American tennis player

- Country (sports): United States
- Born: May 19, 1954 (age 70)

Singles

Grand Slam singles results
- Australian Open: 1R (1974)
- French Open: Q3 (1973, 1974)
- Wimbledon: Q2 (1974)

Doubles

Grand Slam doubles results
- Australian Open: QF (1974)
- US Open: 1R (1972, 1973)

Joy Schwikert (born May 19, 1954) is an American former professional tennis player.

Raised in Las Vegas, Schwikert began competing professionally in 1972 and often toured alongside twin sister Jill, with whom she reached the doubles quarter-finals of the 1974 Australian Open.

Schwikert's eldest daughter, Tasha, was an Olympic gymnast.
