= Jill Schwikert =

American tennis player

- Country (sports): United States
- Born: May 19, 1954 (age 70)

Singles

Grand Slam singles results
- Australian Open: 2R (1974)
- French Open: Q2 (1974)
- Wimbledon: Q2 (1974)

Doubles

Grand Slam doubles results
- Australian Open: QF (1974)
- US Open: 1R (1972)

Grand Slam mixed doubles results
- Wimbledon: 2R (1974)

Jill Schwikert (born May 19, 1954) is an American former professional tennis player.

Schwikert is a native of Las Vegas and turned professional in 1972 after graduating high school. She played a lot of doubles with twin sister Joy and the pair were quarter-finalists at the 1974 Australian Open. In 1974 she also appeared in the mixed doubles main draw at Wimbledon and made the second round.

Her niece, Tasha Schwikert (daughter of Joy), is a retired Olympic gymnast.
