= Monica Rho =

Costa Rican tennis player

- Country (sports): Costa Rica
- Born: 25 October 1955 (age 69)

Singles

Grand Slam singles results
- French Open: 1R (1974)
- Wimbledon: Q1 (1973, 1974)

Doubles

Grand Slam doubles results
- French Open: 2R (1973)

Grand Slam mixed doubles results
- French Open: 2R (1974)

Monica Rho (born 25 October 1955) is a Costa Rican former professional tennis player.

She is the first Costa Rican female tennis player to compete in the Grand Slam. She played in singles at the French Open in 1974. She lost to the Romanian player Judith Dibar-Gohn in the First Round.

In 1973 French Open, her partner in Women's Doubles, Japanese Naoko Sato lost in the Second Round to the American Chris Evert and Soviet Olga Morozova.

== Career finals ==
=== Singles (0–1) ===
Result	No.	Year	Location	Surface	Opponent	Score
Loss	1.	January 1973	Lake Worth, United States	Hard	(United States) Patty Ann Reese	4–6, 1–6

=== Doubles: 3 (2–1) ===
Result	No.	Year	Tournament	Surface	Partner	Opponents	Score
Win	1.	January 1973	Lake Worth, United States	Hard	(Austria) Sabine Bernegger	(United States) Christina Kolifrath (United States) Diana Mostler	6–3, 6–1
Win	2.	February 1973	West Palm Beach, United States	Hard	(Austria) Sabine Bernegger	(United States) Bunny Smith (United States) Vicki Beggs	6–4, 6–4
Loss	1.	December 1973	Key Biscayne, United States	Hard	(United States) Bunny Smith	(Ecuador) María Eugenia Guzmán (Chile) Michelle Rodríguez	4–6, 2–6
