= Thies Röpcke =

German tennis player

- Country (sports): West Germany
- Born: 20 July 1954 (age 70)

Singles
- Career record: 1–4
- Highest ranking: No. 272 (3 June 1974)

Grand Slam singles results
- Australian Open: 1R (1974)

Thies Röpcke (born 20 July 1954) is a German former professional tennis player.

Röpcke, a national junior champion from Hamburg, was active on tour in the 1970s and reached a best singles world ranking of 272. He played an opening round match against Björn Borg at the 1974 Australian Open and took the first set in a tiebreak, then had a series of break points at 2–2 in the second set, before the Swede came back to win.
