= 1974 French Open – Women's doubles =

Women's doubles
- 1974 French Open

Final
- Champion: (United States) Chris Evert (Soviet Union) Olga Morozova
- Runner-up: (France) Gail Chanfreau (West Germany) Katja Ebbinghaus
- Score: 6–4, 2–6, 6–1

Events
Singles	men	women		boys	girls
Doubles	men	women	mixed	boys	girls
WC Singles	men	women	quad
WC Doubles	men	women	quad
Legends	−45	45+	women
← 1973 ·	French Open	· 1975 →

Margaret Court and Virginia Wade were the defending champions but both players chose not to participate.

Chris Evert and Olga Morozova won in the final 6–4, 2–6, 6–1 against Gail Chanfreau and Katja Ebbinghaus.

== Seeds ==
1. (United States) Chris Evert / (Soviet Union) Olga Morozova (champions)
2. (Czechoslovakia) Martina Navratilova / (Czechoslovakia) Renáta Tomanová (semifinals)
3. (France) Gail Chanfreau / (West Germany) Katja Ebbinghaus (final)
4. (West Germany) Helga Masthoff / (West Germany) Heide Orth (quarterfinals)

== Draw ==
=== Key ===
- Q = Qualifier
- WC = Wild card
- LL = Lucky loser
- Alt = Alternate
- SE = Special exempt
- PR = Protected ranking
- ITF = ITF entry
- JE = Junior exempt
- w/o = Walkover
- r = Retired
- d = Defaulted
- SR = Special ranking

=== Finals ===
Semifinals
2	(Czechoslovakia) Martina Navratilova (Czechoslovakia) Renáta Tomanová	4	3
3	(France) Gail Chanfreau (West Germany) Katja Ebbinghaus	6	6
(Argentina) Raquel Giscafré (Italy) Anna-Maria Nasuelli	2	1
1	(United States) Chris Evert (Soviet Union) Olga Morozova	6	6

Final
3	(France) Gail Chanfreau (West Germany) Katja Ebbinghaus	4	6	1
1	(United States) Chris Evert (Soviet Union) Olga Morozova	6	2	6

=== Top half ===
First round
(Indonesia) L Kaligis (Indonesia) L Sugiarto	6	6
(France) O de Roubin (France) C Gimmig	0	0
(Hungary) K Borka (Hungary) B Klein
(Australia) D Fromholtz (United States) L Tenney	w/o
(Costa Rica) M Rho (United States) B Smith	0	1
(Czechoslovakia) R Maršíková (Chile) M Rodríguez	6	6

Second round
2	(Czechoslovakia) M Navratilova (Czechoslovakia) R Tomanová	6	6
(Romania) V Ruzici (Romania) M Simionescu	3	2
(Spain) V Baldovinos (Argentina) E Weisenberger	2	4
(France) R Darmon (France) F Guédy	6	6
3	(France) G Chanfreau (West Germany) K Ebbinghaus	4	7	6
(Indonesia) L Kaligis (Indonesia) L Sugiarto	6	6	2
(Australia) D Fromholtz (United States) L Tenney	6	3	6
(Czechoslovakia) R Maršíková (Chile) M Rodríguez	0	6	1

Quarterfinals
2	(Czechoslovakia) M Navratilova (Czechoslovakia) R Tomanová	6	6
(France) R Darmon (France) F Guédy	2	3
3	(France) G Chanfreau (West Germany) K Ebbinghaus	w/o
(Australia) D Fromholtz (United States) L Tenney

Semifinals
2	(Czechoslovakia) M Navratilova (Czechoslovakia) R Tomanová	4	3
3	(France) G Chanfreau (West Germany) K Ebbinghaus	6	6

=== Bottom half ===
First round
(Argentina) R Giscafré (Italy) A-M Nasuelli	6	7
(Czechoslovakia) M Koželuhová (Czechoslovakia) M Neumanová	3	6
(France) N Fuchs (Belgium) M Van Haver	w/o
(United Kingdom) G Coles (Belgium) M Gurdal

Second round
(Argentina) R Giscafré (Italy) A-M Nasuelli	7	7
(France) N Fuchs (Belgium) M Van Haver	5	6
(France) D Bouteleux (France) F Thibault	1	2
4	(West Germany) H Masthoff (West Germany) H Orth	6	6
(Japan) K Fukuoka (Japan) K Sawamatsu	6	7
(Socialist Federal Republic of Yugoslavia) M Jaušovec (United States) R Tenney	4	5
(Brazil) V-L Cleto (France) A-M Rouchon
1	(United States) C Evert (Soviet Union) O Morozova	w/o

Quarterfinals
(Argentina) R Giscafré (Italy) A-M Nasuelli	1	6	6
4	(West Germany) H Masthoff (West Germany) H Orth	6	4	4
(Japan) K Fukuoka (Japan) K Sawamatsu	6	4	5
1	(United States) C Evert (Soviet Union) O Morozova	2	6	7

Semifinals
(Argentina) R Giscafré (Italy) A-M Nasuelli	2	1
1	(United States) C Evert (Soviet Union) O Morozova	6	6
