= 1974 French Open – Mixed doubles =

Mixed doubles
- 1974 French Open

Final
- Champions: (Czechoslovakia) Martina Navratilova (Colombia) Iván Molina
- Runners-up: (Mexico) Rosie Reyes Darmon (Mexico) Marcello Lara
- Score: 6–3, 6–3

Details
- Draw: 23

Events
Singles	men	women		boys	girls
Doubles	men	women	mixed	boys	girls
WC Singles	men	women	quad
WC Doubles	men	women	quad
Legends	−45	45+	women
- French Open

Martina Navratilova and Iván Molina defeated Rosie Reyes Darmon and Marcello Lara in the final, 6–3, 6–3 to win the mixed doubles tennis title at the 1974 French Open. It was the first major for both Molina and Navratilova. For Navratilova, it was the first of an eventual ten mixed doubles major titles, and the first of an eventual Open Era record 59 major titles overall.

Françoise Dürr and Jean-Claude Barclay were the defending champions, but Dürr did not compete this year. Barclay partnered Julie Heldman, but lost in the quarterfinals to Rosie Reyes Darmon and Marcello Lara.

== Seeds ==
No seeds were given for this tournament.

== Draw ==
Key

- Q = Qualifier
- WC = Wild card
- LL = Lucky loser
- Alt = Alternate
- ITF = ITF entry
- PR = Protected ranking
- SR = Special ranking
- SE = Special exempt
- JE = Junior exempt
- JR = Junior Accelerator Programme entrant
- CO = College Accelerator Programme entrant
- NG = Next Gen Accelerator Program entrant
- w/o = Walkover
- r = Retired
- d = Defaulted

=== Finals ===
Semifinals
(France) Gail Chanfreau (France) Patrice Dominguez	3	6
(Czechoslovakia) Martina Navratilova (Colombia) Iván Molina	6	7
(France) Nathalie Fuchs (France) Wanaro N'Godrella	6	6	3
(Mexico) Rosie Reyes Darmon (Mexico) Marcello Lara	7	3	6

Final
(Czechoslovakia) Martina Navratilova (Colombia) Iván Molina	6	6
(Mexico) Rosie Reyes Darmon (Mexico) Marcello Lara	3	3

=== Top half ===
First round
(Czechoslovakia) R Maršíková (Australia) D Crealy	6	6
(France) C Gimmig (France) D Grozdanovich	0	3
(France) D Bouteleux (France) A Bouteleux	6	3
(Belgium) M Van Haver (Morocco) O Laimina	7	6
(Argentina) R Giscafré (Colombia) J Velasco Sr.
(Czechoslovakia) M Navratilova (Colombia) I Molina	w/o
(Australia) D Fromholtz (United States) W Brown
(France) O de Roubin (France) JB Chanfreau	w/o

Second round
(France) G Chanfreau (France) P Dominguez	6	6
(France) J Mauroy (Ecuador) E Zuleta	3	3
(Italy) A-M Nasuelli (France) P Joly	6	6
(France) F Thibault (France) É Loliée	4	3
(Czechoslovakia) R Maršíková (Australia) D Crealy	6	7
(Belgium) M Van Haver (Morocco) O Laimina	4	5
(Czechoslovakia) M Navratilova (Colombia) I Molina	6	6
(France) O de Roubin (France) JB Chanfreau	2	2

Quarterfinals
(France) G Chanfreau (France) P Dominguez	6	6
(Italy) A-M Nasuelli (France) P Joly	0	3
(Czechoslovakia) R Maršíková (Australia) D Crealy	0	5
(Czechoslovakia) M Navratilova (Colombia) I Molina	6	7

Semifinals
(France) G Chanfreau (France) P Dominguez	3	6
(Czechoslovakia) M Navratilova (Colombia) I Molina	6	7

=== Bottom half ===
First round
(Chile) M Rodríguez (France) M Boulle	4	2
(Brazil) V-L Cleto (Brazil) T Koch	6	6
(France) F Guédy (France) T Bernasconi	2	7	3
(Czechoslovakia) R Tomanová (Czechoslovakia) J Písecký	6	6	6
(France) P Rime (France) J-P Loth	w/o
(Sweden) M Wikstedt (Poland) W Fibak

Second round
(Brazil) V-L Cleto (Brazil) T Koch	5	2
(Czechoslovakia) R Tomanová (Czechoslovakia) J Písecký	7	6
(France) P Rime (France) J-P Loth	2	2
(France) N Fuchs (France) W N'Godrella	6	6
(Mexico) R Reyes Darmon (Mexico) M Lara	w/o
(Hungary) B Klein (Hungary) J Benyik
(Costa Rica) M Rho (Czechoslovakia) J Šolc
(United States) J Heldman (France) JC Barclay	w/o

Quarterfinals
(Czechoslovakia) R Tomanová (Czechoslovakia) J Písecký	4	6
(France) N Fuchs (France) W N'Godrella	6	7
(Mexico) R Reyes Darmon (Mexico) M Lara	6	6
(United States) J Heldman (France) JC Barclay	4	3

Semifinals
(France) N Fuchs (France) W N'Godrella	6	6	3
(Mexico) R Reyes Darmon (Mexico) M Lara	7	3	6
