= Nora Blom =

Dutch tennis player

- Country (sports): Netherlands
- Born: 22 February 1951 (age 74)
- Plays: Left-handed

Singles

Grand Slam singles results
- Australian Open: 1R (1974)
- Wimbledon: Q1 (1973, 1974)

Doubles

Grand Slam doubles results
- Australian Open: 1R (1974)

Grand Slam mixed doubles results
- Wimbledon: 1R (1974)

Nora Blom (born 22 February 1951) is a Dutch former professional tennis player. While touring in the 1970s she was known by her married name Nora Lauteslager.

Blom is a descendant of tennis players Otto Blom and Arthur Diemer Kool.

A left-handed player, Blom was youth champion of the Netherlands in 1967 for the 17s and youth champion for the 20s in 1970. She made her only grand slam singles main draw appearance at the 1974 Australian Open and was beaten in the first round by seventh-seed Pam Teeguarden. In 1974 and 1975 she was a member of the Netherlands Federation Cup team, playing one singles and two doubles rubbers. She won the Dutch national doubles championships in 1977.

== See also ==
- List of Netherlands Fed Cup team representatives
