= Lindsey Beaven =

British tennis player

- Country (sports): United Kingdom
- Born: 1 January 1950 (age 75)
- Plays: Right-handed

Singles

Grand Slam singles results
- Australian Open: 1R (1974)
- French Open: 1R (1974)
- Wimbledon: 4R (1971, 1975)
- US Open: 2R (1974, 1976, 1977)

Doubles

Grand Slam doubles results
- Australian Open: QF (1974)
- Wimbledon: 2R (1970, 1972, 1974, 1975, 1976)
- US Open: 2R (1976, 1977)

Grand Slam mixed doubles results
- Wimbledon: 3R (1971)
- US Open: 2R (1972, 1975, 1976)

Lindsey Beaven (born 1 January 1950) is a British former professional tennis player.

Beaven represented Great Britain in the 1973 Wightman Cup. She twice reached the round of 16 at Wimbledon, and she was a doubles quarter-finalist at the 1974 Australian Open.

Beaven grew up in England, then moved to the United States while competing on tour in the 1970s, and she has remained in her adopted country, where she works as a therapist.
