= Daryl Gralka =

American tennis player

- Full name: Daryl Gralka Lerner
- Country (sports): United States
- Born: May 4, 1954 (age 70)

Singles

Grand Slam singles results
- French Open: 2R (1974)
- Wimbledon: Q1 (1974)

Grand Slam mixed doubles results
- Wimbledon: 2R (1974)

Daryl Gralka Lerner (born May 4, 1954) is an American former professional tennis player.

A native of Houston, Gralka was active on the professional tour in the 1970s. She featured as a lucky loser in the singles main draw of the 1974 French Open and won her first round match over Antonella Rosa.

From 1979 to 1984 she served as the women's head coach at the University of Houston.
