= 1974 Australian Open – Men's singles =

Men's singles
- 1974 Australian Open

Final
- Champion: (United States) Jimmy Connors
- Runner-up: (Australia) Phil Dent
- Score: 7–6^{(9–7)}, 6–4, 4–6, 6–3

Details
- Draw: 64
- Seeds: 16

Events
Singles	men	women		boys	girls
Doubles	men	women	mixed	boys	girls
WC Singles	men	women	quad
WC Doubles	men	women	quad
Legends	men	women	mixed
- Australian Open

Jimmy Connors defeated Phil Dent in the final, 7–6^{(9–7)}, 6–4, 4–6, 6–3 to win the men's singles tennis title at the 1974 Australian Open. It was his first major title. Connors was making his tournament debut. For the first time in the Open Era, none of the semifinalists at a major had previously won a major title.

John Newcombe was the defending champion, but lost in the quarterfinals to Ross Case.

Björn Borg competed in the Australian Open this year for the first and only time in his career. He lost to Dent in the third round.

The format was the same as the previous year, with the first round as best-of-three-sets and the rest of the tournament as best-of-five-sets.

== Seeds ==
The seeded players are listed below. Jimmy Connors is the champion; others show the round in which they were eliminated.

1. (Australia) John Newcombe (quarterfinals)
2. (United States) Jimmy Connors (champion)
3. (Australia) John Alexander (semifinals)
4. (Sweden) Björn Borg (third round)
5. (West Germany) Karl Meiler (second round)
6. (Australia) Colin Dibley (quarterfinals)
7. (New Zealand) Onny Parun (third round)
8. (Australia) Ross Case (semifinals)
9. (Australia) Phil Dent (final)
10. (Australia) Dick Crealy (third round)
11. (Australia) Geoff Masters (first round)
12. (Australia) Allan Stone (third round)
13. (Australia) Bob Giltinan (quarterfinals)
14. (Australia) Barry Phillips-Moore (third round)
15. (Australia) Bob Carmichael (first round)
16. (Australia) John Cooper (first round)

== Draw ==
=== Final eight ===
Quarterfinals
1	(Australia) John Newcombe	6	2	5
8	(Australia) Ross Case	7	6	7
9	(Australia) Phil Dent	6	6	6
6	(Australia) Colin Dibley	4	4	4
13	(Australia) Bob Giltinan	1	7	1	2
3	(Australia) John Alexander	6	5	6	6
(Czechoslovakia) Vladimír Zedník	6	5	3	4
2	(United States) Jimmy Connors	3	7	6	6

Semifinals
8	(Australia) Ross Case	4	1	6	2
9	(Australia) Phil Dent	6	6	2	6
3	(Australia) John Alexander	6	4	4
2	(United States) Jimmy Connors	7	6	6

Finals
9	(Australia) Phil Dent	6	4	6	3
2	(United States) Jimmy Connors	7	6	4	6

=== Section 1 ===
First round
1	(Australia) J Newcombe	6	6
(Japan) K Hirai	2	4
(Australia) K Warwick	6	6
(United Kingdom) J Paish	4	4
(Australia) J Bartlett	6	6	6
(Australia) R Casey	4	7	4
(Australia) F Sedgman	4	3
14	(Australia) B Phillips-Moore	6	6
8	(Australia) R Case	6	6
(Australia) R Keldie	2	0
(Australia) T Roche	7	6
(Australia) C Stubs	6	2
(France) J-F Caujolle	6	6
(Switzerland) P Kanderal	4	1
(France) W N'Godrella	4	6	7
15	(Australia) B Carmichael	6	2	5

Second round
1	(Australia) J Newcombe	6	6	6	6
(Australia) K Warwick	3	3	7	4
(Australia) J Bartlett	7	5	6	1	4
14	(Australia) B Phillips-Moore	6	7	4	6	6
8	(Australia) R Case	6	2	7	6	6
(Australia) T Roche	7	6	5	4	4
(France) J-F Caujolle	3	5	3
(France) W N'Godrella	6	7	6

Third round
1	(Australia) J Newcombe	7	6	3	6
14	(Australia) B Phillips-Moore	6	3	6	1
8	(Australia) R Case	6	6	4	6
(France) W N'Godrella	2	3	6	4

Quarterfinals
1	(Australia) J Newcombe	6	2	5
8	(Australia) R Case	7	6	7

=== Section 2 ===
First round
4	(Sweden) B Borg	6	6	6
(West Germany) T Roepcke	7	3	1
(Mexico) M Lara	6	3	7
(France) J Thamin	4	6	5
(United States) W Brown	7	6
(Australia) M Phillips	5	2
(West Germany) U Pinner	3	3
9	(Australia) P Dent	6	6
6	(Australia) C Dibley	2	7	6
(Australia) N Fraser	6	6	0
(United Kingdom) J Lloyd	6	6
(Netherlands) J Hordijk	4	4
(United Kingdom) M Farrell
(France) P Joly	w/o
(Australia) K Hancock	7	7
11	(Australia) G Masters	6	6

Second round
4	(Sweden) B Borg
(Mexico) M Lara	w/o
(United States) W Brown	2	3	2
9	(Australia) P Dent	6	6	6
6	(Australia) C Dibley	7	6	6
(United Kingdom) J Lloyd	6	4	1
(United Kingdom) M Farrell	2	4	2
(Australia) K Hancock	6	6	6

Third round
4	(Sweden) B Borg	4	1	2
9	(Australia) P Dent	6	6	6
6	(Australia) C Dibley	4	6	7	5	8
(Australia) K Hancock	6	4	5	7	6

Quarterfinals
9	(Australia) P Dent	6	6	6
6	(Australia) C Dibley	4	4	4

=== Section 3 ===
First round
13	(Australia) B Giltinan	6	6
(Peru) F Ponte	3	3
(Australia) W Durham	6	6
(Australia) A Hammond	2	4
(United Kingdom) J Feaver	6	6
(United States) G Hardie	3	4
(Australia) J James	4	1
7	(New Zealand) O Parun	6	6
10	(Australia) D Crealy	6	6
(Australia) T Allan	1	1
(France) D Naegelen	6	6
(India) J Singh	4	3
(Czechoslovakia) M Holeček	7	6
(Australia) W Coghlan	6	2
(France) T Bernasconi	6	1
3	(Australia) J Alexander	7	6

Second round
13	(Australia) B Giltinan	7	6	6
(Australia) W Durham	6	2	0
(United Kingdom) J Feaver	6	6	3	6	6
7	(New Zealand) O Parun	4	4	6	7	8
10	(Australia) D Crealy	7	7	6
(France) D Naegelen	6	6	4
(Czechoslovakia) M Holeček	6	4	3	1
3	(Australia) J Alexander	4	6	6	6

Third round
13	(Australia) B Giltinan	7	7	6
7	(New Zealand) O Parun	6	6	3
10	(Australia) D Crealy	7	2	7	3	4
3	(Australia) J Alexander	6	6	5	6	6

Quarterfinals
13	(Australia) B Giltinan	1	7	1	2
3	(Australia) J Alexander	6	5	6	6

=== Section 4 ===
First round
12	(Australia) A Stone	6	6
(Australia) S Myers	4	2
(Australia) I Fletcher	7	7
(Australia) C Letcher	6	5
(Czechoslovakia) V Zedník	6	6
(Australia) M Senior	3	4
(United States) L Parker	6	4
5	(West Germany) K Meiler	7	6
16	(Australia) J Cooper	5	6
(Japan) K Tanabe	7	7
(Australia) S Ball	7	6
(Australia) E Ewert	6	3
(Australia) G Thomson	6	6
(France) J-P Meyer	4	3
(France) J-L Haillet	1	5
2	(United States) J Connors	6	7

Second round
12	(Australia) A Stone	7	7	7
(Australia) I Fletcher	6	5	6
(Czechoslovakia) V Zedník	6	7	6	3	6
5	(West Germany) K Meiler	7	5	4	6	1
(Japan) K Tanabe	3	4	2
(Australia) S Ball	6	6	6
(Australia) G Thomson	4	2	6
2	(United States) J Connors	6	6	7

Third round
12	(Australia) A Stone	6	5	6	6
(Czechoslovakia) V Zedník	4	7	7	7
(Australia) S Ball	4	7	7	3	4
2	(United States) J Connors	6	5	6	6	6

Quarterfinals
(Czechoslovakia) V Zedník	6	5	3	4
2	(United States) J Connors	3	7	6	6

Preceded by 1973 U.S. Open	Grand Slam men's singles	Succeeded by 1974 French Open
