= List of Netherlands Fed Cup team representatives =

This is a list of tennis players who have represented the Netherlands Fed Cup team in an official Fed Cup match. The Netherlands have taken part in the competition since 1963.

== Players ==
Player	W-L (Total)	W-L (Singles)	W-L (Doubles)	Ties	Debut
Elly Appel-Vessies	17 – 13	11 – 10	6 – 3	23	1974
Ada Bakker	5 – 2	-	5 – 2	7	1969
Carin Bakkum	1 – 0	-	1 – 0	2	1988
Kiki Bertens	24 – 4	18 – 2	6 – 2	17	2011
Manon Bollegraf	15 – 15	5 – 6	10 – 9	23	1988
Kristie Boogert	22 – 13	12 – 8	10 – 5	29	1993
Marrit Boonstra	3 – 0	-	3 – 0	3	2006
Cindy Burger	0 – 3	-	0 – 3	3	2016
Eva Duldig De Jong	2 – 2	1 – 1	1 – 1	2	1963
Chayenne Ewijk	2 – 2	2 – 2	-	4	2010
Michelle Gerards	3 – 1	1 – 1	2 – 0	4	2005
Trudy Groenman	12 – 13	4 – 6	8 – 7	16	1964
Richèl Hogenkamp	16 – 9	8 – 6	8 – 3	22	2010
Amanda Hopmans	13 – 7	8 – 6	5 – 1	15	1998
Lesley Kerkhove	4 – 2	1 – 1	3 – 1	4	2014
Digna Ketelaar	2 – 1	-	2 – 1	3	1984
Michaëlla Krajicek	17 – 15	10 – 11	7 – 4	29	2004
Nora Lauteslager	2 – 1	1 – 0	1 – 1	2	1974
Quirine Lemoine	0 – 2	0 – 2	-	1	2018
Marcella Mesker	25 – 18	10 – 11	15 – 7	26	1979
Karin Moos	5 – 2	2 – 2	3 – 0	5	1980
Nicole Muns-Jagerman	4 – 5	2 – 4	2 – 1	7	1989
Seda Noorlander	9 – 2	4 – 2	5 – 0	10	2000
Miriam Oremans	35 – 27	20 – 23	15 – 4	39	1992
Renée Reinhard	3 – 1	3 – 1	-	4	2008
Jenny Ridderhof	2 – 2	1 – 1	1 – 1	2	1963
Marielle Rooimans	1 – 1	-	1 – 1	2	1985
Stephanie Rottier	2 – 1	2 – 1	-	3	1993
Arantxa Rus	15 – 13	15 – 8	0 – 5	23	2008
Marijke Schaar	17 – 15	11 – 13	6 – 2	24	1968
Simone Schilder	1 – 3	1 – 2	0 – 1	3	1984
Bibiane Schoofs	3 – 6	2 – 3	1 – 3	8	2012
Brenda Schultz-McCarthy	22 – 11	13 – 9	9 – 2	23	1988
Nanette Schutte	5 – 3	4 – 1	1 – 2	7	1980
Demi Schuurs	2 – 1	-	2 – 1	3	2012
Betty Stöve	45 – 15	22 – 5	23 – 10	33	1964
Astrid Suurbeek	4 – 3	1 – 2	3 – 1	4	1968
Elise Tamaëla	8 – 9	6 – 8	2 – 1	14	2003
Hellas ter Riet	6 – 2	4 – 0	2 – 2	4	1986
Nicole Thyssen	10 – 6	3 – 1	7 – 5	13	2007
Tessy van de Ven	1 – 1	-	1 – 1	2	2004
Angelique van der Meet	1 – 0	-	1 – 0	3	2013
Marianne van der Torre	18 – 13	9 – 8	9 – 5	19	1981
Anousjka van Exel	1 – 3	0 – 1	1 – 2	3	2004
Elsie Veentjer-Spruyt	1 – 2	0 – 2	1 – 0	2	1966
Lidy Venneboer	4 – 4	1 – 2	3 – 2	5	1967
Caroline Vis	6 – 6	-	6 – 6	12	1988
Judith Warringa	3 – 0	3 – 0	-	3	1983
Pauline Wong	3 – 4	0 – 1	3 – 3	6	2007
Tine Zwaan	6 – 4	1 – 1	5 – 3	9	1973
