= Jackie Fayter =

British tennis player

- Full name: Jackie Fayter-Hough
- Country (sports): Great Britain
- Born: 10 June 1951 (age 74) Exeter, Devon, England

Singles

Grand Slam singles results
- Australian Open: 3R (1974)
- French Open: 2R (1973, 1974)
- Wimbledon: 2R (1971, 73, 75, 76, 77)
- US Open: 3R (1976)

Doubles

Grand Slam doubles results
- Australian Open: 1R (1974)
- Wimbledon: 3R (1972, 1973, 1977)
- US Open: 3R (1978)

Jackie Fayter-Hough (born 10 June 1951) is a British former professional tennis player who competed at the international level.

== Biography ==
Born in Devon, Fayter played on the international circuit during the 1970s and appeared in the main draw of all four Grand Slam tournaments. She made the third round of the 1974 Australian Open and 1976 US Open. Her title wins include the Scandinavian Indoor Championships in 1977.

Since 1980, she has been known as Jackie Fayter-Hough through marriage.
