= Nellemieke Brouwer =

Dutch tennis player

- Country (sports): Netherlands
- Born: 20 May 1953 (age 71)

Singles

Grand Slam singles results
- Australian Open: 2R (1974)

Doubles

Grand Slam doubles results
- Australian Open: 1R (1974)

Nellemieke Brouwer (born 20 May 1953) is a Dutch former professional tennis player.

Brouwer, a player from Heemskerk in North Holland, had a win over Tine Zwaan at the 1972 Dutch national championships. She was included in a development squad which toured Australia in late 1973 and made the singles second round of the Australian Open, losing to Patricia Coleman.
