= 1974 Australian Open – Women's singles =

Women's singles
- 1974 Australian Open

Final
- Champion: (Australia) Evonne Goolagong
- Runner-up: (United States) Chris Evert
- Score: 7–6, 4–6, 6–0

Details
- Draw: 56
- Seeds: 8

Events
Singles	men	women		boys	girls
Doubles	men	women	mixed	boys	girls
WC Singles	men	women	quad
WC Doubles	men	women	quad
Legends	men	women	mixed
- Australian Open

Evonne Goolagong defeated Chris Evert in the final, 7–6, 4–6, 6–0 to win the women's singles tennis title at the 1974 Australian Open. It was her first Australian Open title and third major title overall, following three consecutive runner-up finishes at the tournament. Evert was making her tournament debut.

Margaret Court was the reigning champion, but did not compete this year due to pregnancy.

== Seeds ==
The seeded players are listed below. Evonne Goolagong is the champion; others show the round in which they were eliminated.

1. (United States) Chris Evert (finalist)
2. (Australia) Evonne Goolagong (champion)
3. (Australia) Kerry Melville (semifinals)
4. (United States) Julie Heldman (semifinals)
5. (Australia) Lesley Hunt (quarterfinals)
6. (Australia) Kerry Harris (first round)
7. (United States) Pam Teeguarden (second round)
8. (Japan) Kazuko Sawamatsu (third round)

== Draw ==
=== Key ===
- Q = Qualifier
- WC = Wild card
- LL = Lucky loser
- r = Retired

=== Finals ===
Quarterfinals
1	(United States) Chris Evert	6	6
(United States) Janet Newberry	2	4
5	(Australia) Lesley Hunt	5	7	2
4	(United States) Julie Heldman	7	6	6
3	(Australia) Kerry Melville	6	6
(Australia) Judy Dalton	3	4
(Australia) Karen Krantzcke	6	3	2
2	(Australia) Evonne Goolagong	4	6	6

Semifinals
1	(United States) Chris Evert	6	6
4	(United States) Julie Heldman	2	3
3	(Australia) Kerry Melville	6	7	1
2	(Australia) Evonne Goolagong	7	5	6

Finals
1	(United States) Chris Evert	6	6	0
2	(Australia) Evonne Goolagong	7	4	6

=== Earlier rounds ===
==== Section 1 ====
First round
(Australia) J Walker	7	3	7
(Australia) C Matison	6	6	5
(United States) J Newberry	6	6
(Japan) K Nomura	0	2
(Australia) M Tesch	6	6
(Australia) K Hogarth	4	1
(Sweden) H Anliot	4	3
8	(Japan) K Sawamatsu	6	6

Second round
1	(United States) C Evert	6	6
(Hungary) K Szeman	0	0
(Australia) J Fallis	3	6	6
(Japan) T Sade	6	0	3
(Australia) J Walker	4	6
(United States) J Newberry	6	7
(Australia) M Tesch	6	2	4
8	(Japan) K Sawamatsu	1	6	6

Third round
1	(United States) C Evert	6	6
(Australia) J Fallis	1	1
(United States) J Newberry	6	6
8	(Japan) K Sawamatsu	3	3

Quarterfinals
1	(United States) C Evert	6	6
(United States) J Newberry	2	4

==== Section 2 ====
First round
5	(Australia) L Hunt	6	6
(Australia) W Paish	4	0
(Australia) H Gourlay	6	4	7
(United Kingdom) L Beaven	2	6	5
(United Kingdom) S Barker	7	6
(Sweden) I Larsson	6	3
(United States) J Schwikert	6	6
(Australia) F Candy	4	2
(Netherlands) N Brouwer	6	6
(Australia) B Rae	4	3
(Australia) P Coleman	7	5	6
(Sweden) M Strandberg	5	7	3
(Australia) W Turnbull	6	6
(Australia) B Dale	0	0
(Australia) N Gregory	3	3
4	(United States) J Heldman	6	6

Second round
5	(Australia) L Hunt	6	7
(Australia) H Gourlay	2	6
(United Kingdom) S Barker	6	6	6
(United States) J Schwikert	2	7	3
(Netherlands) N Brouwer	0	2
(Australia) P Coleman	6	6
(Australia) W Turnbull	3	4
4	(United States) J Heldman	6	6

Third round
5	(Australia) L Hunt	7	6
(United Kingdom) S Barker	5	2
(Australia) P Coleman	1	2
4	(United States) J Heldman	6	6

Quarterfinals
5	(Australia) L Hunt	5	7	2
4	(United States) J Heldman	7	6	6

==== Section 3 ====
First round
3	(Australia) K Melville	6	6
(Australia) K Chute	1	2
(Australia) D Fromholtz	7	6	6
(Australia) P Whytcross	6	7	0
(United States) A Kiyomura	6	6
(United Kingdom) J Griffiths	1	3
(Australia) M Morgan	6	6
(Netherlands) A Schothurst	2	0
(Australia) G Williams	7	6
(Australia) S Arnott	6	2
(United Kingdom) J Fayter	6	6
(United States) J Schwikert	3	2
(Australia) J Dalton	4	6	6
(Australia) C O'Neil	6	2	2
(Australia) J Dimond	2	6	6
6	(Australia) K Harris	6	3	4

Second round
3	(Australia) K Melville	6	6
(Australia) D Fromholtz	2	1
(United States) A Kiyomura	6	6
(Australia) M Morgan	1	2
(Australia) G Williams	2	1
(United Kingdom) J Fayter	6	6
(Australia) J Dalton	4	6	6
(Australia) J Dimond	6	2	0

Third round
3	(Australia) K Melville	6	6
(United States) A Kiyomura	3	3
(United Kingdom) J Fayter	3	5
(Australia) J Dalton	6	7

Quarterfinals
3	(Australia) K Melville	6	6
(Australia) J Dalton	3	4

==== Section 4 ====
First round
7	(United States) P Teeguarden	6	6
(Netherlands) N Lauteslager	1	3
(Australia) K Krantzcke	6	6
(Australia) V Lancaster	3	3
(Sweden) M Wikstedt	2	6	6
(Australia) B Hawcroft	6	1	1
(Australia) J Young	6	6
(Australia) K Walker	3	4

Second round
7	(United States) P Teeguarden	6	1	2
(Australia) K Krantzcke	4	6	6
(Sweden) M Wikstedt	2	3
(Australia) J Young	6	6
(Australia) J O'Neill	4	4
(United States) P Michel	6	6
(Japan) M Yokobori	0	0
2	(Australia) E Goolagong	6	6

Third round
(Australia) K Krantzcke	6	4	6
(Australia) J Young	4	6	4
(United States) P Michel	6	4
2	(Australia) E Goolagong	7	6

Quarterfinals
(Australia) K Krantzcke	6	3	2
2	(Australia) E Goolagong	4	6	6

Preceded by 1973 US Open – Women's singles	Grand Slam women's singles	Succeeded by 1974 French Open – Women's singles
