= Elvira Weisenberger =

Argentine tennis player

- Country (sports): Argentina
- Born: 24 December 1949 (age 76)
- Plays: Right-handed

Singles

Grand Slam singles results
- French Open: 3R (1974)
- Wimbledon: 2R (1974)
- US Open: 1R (1976)

Doubles

Grand Slam doubles results
- French Open: 2R (1974, 1976)
- Wimbledon: 1R (1975)

Elvira Weisenberger (born 24 December 1949) is an Argentine former professional tennis player.

== Biography ==
Weisenberger competed in 12 Federation Cup ties for Argentina from 1973 to 1977. Her best grand slam performance was a third round appearance at the 1974 French Open. She is a former president of the Women's International Tennis Association (WITA), an organisation that ran parallel to the WTA in the 1970s.

== See also ==
- List of Argentina Fed Cup team representatives
