= Margareta Forsgårdh =

Swedish tennis player

- Country (sports): Sweden
- Born: 20 March 1951 (age 74)

Singles

Grand Slam singles results
- Australian Open: 1R (1974)
- French Open: 2R (1975)
- Wimbledon: 1R (1975)

Doubles

Grand Slam doubles results
- Australian Open: 1R (1974)
- French Open: 2R (1969)
- Wimbledon: 2R (1975)

Margareta Forsgårdh (born 20 March 1951) is a Swedish former professional tennis player. Her name before marriage was Margareta Strandberg.

Forsgårdh, a three-time national champion in singles, represented Sweden in the Federation Cup during the 1970s. She featured in five ties for her country and won three singles rubbers.

Her best grand slam performance was a second round appearance at the 1975 French Open.

== See also ==
- List of Sweden Fed Cup team representatives
