= Helen Park (tennis) =

South Korean tennis player

- Full name: Helen Park-Bates
- Country (sports): South Korea
- Born: 3 June 1959 (age 66)
- College: Cal State LA
- Fed Cup: 3–4

Helen Park-Bates (born 3 June 1959) is a South Korean former professional tennis player.

Park attended college in the United States and had a successful career for Cal State LA in varsity tennis. She won the AIAW Division II singles championship in 1979 and is a member of Cal State LA's Athletics Hall of Fame.

A member of the South Korea Federation Cup team, Park featured in a total of seven ties for her country, winning one singles and two doubles rubbers. She debuted in 1976 and made her last appearance in 1984.
