= Vicky Baldovinos =

Spanish tennis player (born 1953)

- Full name: María-Victoria Baldovinos-Cibeira
- Country (sports): Spain
- Born: 8 February 1953 (age 72)

Singles

Grand Slam singles results
- French Open: 3R (1974)

Doubles

Grand Slam doubles results
- French Open: 2R (1974, 1975)

María-Victoria Baldovinos-Cibeira (born 8 February 1953) is a Spanish former professional tennis player.

Baldovinos, a native of Barcelona, was ranked as high as number two in Spain. She reached the round of 16 at the 1974 French Open and appeared in a total of 16 ties for the Spain Federation Cup team.

== See also ==
- List of Spain Fed Cup team representatives
