= Anna-Maria Nasuelli =

Italian tennis player

Maria Nasuelli
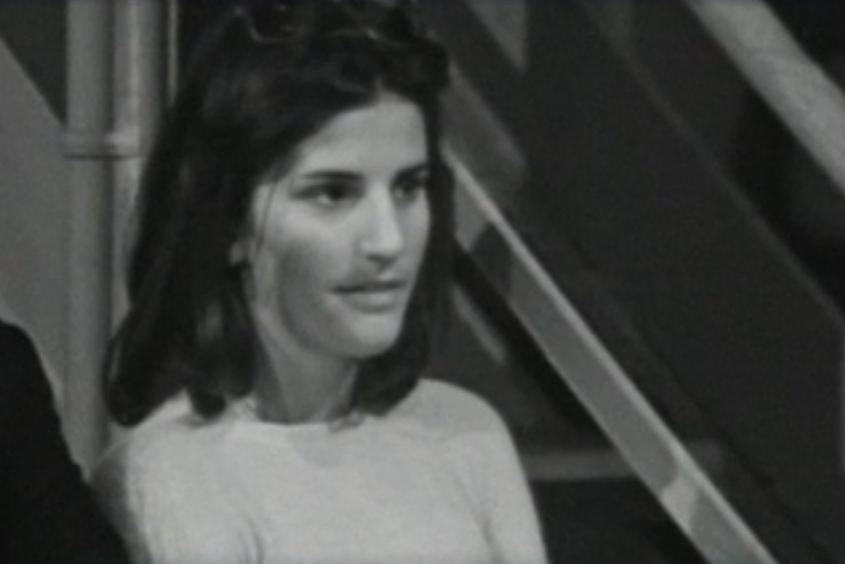
- Full name: Anna-Maria Teresa Nasuelli
- Country (sports): Italy
- Born: 19 July 1947 (age 77)
- Plays: Right-handed

Singles

Grand Slam singles results
- French Open: 3R (1971, 1974)
- Wimbledon: 1R (1970, 1971, 1975)
- US Open: 1R (1972, 1975)

Doubles

Grand Slam doubles results
- French Open: SF (1974)
- Wimbledon: 3R (1974)

Grand Slam mixed doubles results
- French Open: QF (1974)
- Wimbledon: 2R (1974)

Anna-Maria Teresa Nasuelli (born 19 July 1947) is an Italian former professional tennis player.

She played in six Federation Cup ties for Italy, including a quarterfinal against Australia in 1972. She twice reached the third round of the singles at the French Open, including in 1974 when she was a doubles semifinalist with Raquel Giscafré.

== See also ==
- List of Italy Fed Cup team representatives
