= Mandy Morgan (tennis) =

Australian tennis player

- Country (sports): Australia
- Born: 4 July 1953 (age 71)

Singles

Grand Slam singles results
- Australian Open: 2R (1973, 1974)
- Wimbledon: Q3 (1974)

Doubles

Grand Slam doubles results
- Australian Open: QF (1973)
- Wimbledon: 1R (1972)

Grand Slam mixed doubles results
- Wimbledon: 3R (1974)

Mandy Morgan (born 4 July 1953) is an Australian former professional tennis player.

A native of Adelaide, Morgan competed on the professional tour in the early 1970s.

Morgan twice won through to the singles second round of the Australian Open and was a doubles quarter-finalist in the 1973 tournament (with Pam Whytcross). She appeared in the mixed doubles third round at Wimbledon in 1974.
