= Nancy Ornstein =

American tennis player (born 1952)

- Country (sports): United States
- Born: July 31, 1952 (age 73)

Singles

Grand Slam singles results
- French Open: 2R (1972)
- Wimbledon: 2R (1972)
- US Open: 1R (1969, 1973)

Doubles

Grand Slam doubles results
- French Open: 1R (1978)
- Wimbledon: 2R (1974)
- US Open: 1R (1971)

Nancy Ornstein (born July 31, 1952) is an American former professional tennis player.

Ornstein grew up in the Washington D.C. area and was a Junior Orange Bowl champion. She competed on the international tour in the 1970s, featuring in the second rounds of both the French Open and Wimbledon.
