= Kayoko Fukuoka =

Japanese tennis player (born 1949)

- Country (sports): Japan
- Born: 1 August 1949 (age 76)

Singles

Grand Slam singles results
- French Open: 1R (1974)

Doubles

Grand Slam doubles results
- French Open: QF (1973, 1974)
- Wimbledon: 2R (1974, 1975)
- US Open: 2R (1973)
Medal record
Representing Japan
Asian Games
Gold medal – first place	1974 Tehran	Doubles
Summer Universiade
Silver medal – second place	1973 Moscow	Doubles

Kayoko Fukuoka (福岡 加余子, Fukuoka Kayoko; born 1 August 1949) is a Japanese former professional tennis player.

Fukuoka, a two-time French Open quarter-finalist in doubles, featured in 16 Federation Cup ties for Japan as a doubles specialist and won a total of 12 matches.

At the 1974 Asian Games in Tehran, Fukuoka partnered with Toshiko Sade to win the women's doubles event. She was also a silver medalist at the 1973 University Games.

== WTA finals ==
=== Doubles (0–2) ===
Result	W-L	Date	Tournament	Surface	Partner	Opponents	Score
Loss	0–1	Jul 1974	Gstaad, Switzerland	Clay	(Chile) Michelle Rodríguez	(West Germany) Helga Schultze (Italy) Lea Pericoli	2-6, 0-6
Loss	0–2	Nov 1975	Tokyo, Japan	Hard	(Japan) Kiyomi Nomura	(United States) Ann Kiyomura (Japan) Kazuko Sawamatsu	2-6, 3-6

== Other finals ==
=== Doubles ===
Result	Date	Tournament	Location	Partner	Opponents	Score
Silver	August 1973	1973 Summer Universiade	Moscow, Soviet Union	(Japan) Kazuko Sawamatsu	(Soviet Union) Olga Morozova (Soviet Union) Zaiga Jansone	0–6, 3–6
Gold	September 1974	1974 Asian Games	Tehran, Iran	(Japan) Toshiko Sade	(South Korea) Lee Soon-oh (South Korea) Lee Duk-hee	6–2, 6–3

== See also ==
- List of Japan Fed Cup team representatives
