= Florence Guédy =

French tennis player

- Country (sports): France
- Born: 7 December 1954 (age 70)

Singles

Grand Slam singles results
- French Open: 2R (1974, 1975, 1976)
- Wimbledon: 2R (1977)
- US Open: Q3 (1977)

Doubles

Grand Slam doubles results
- French Open: QF (1974)
- Wimbledon: 1R (1973, 1974)

Grand Slam mixed doubles results
- French Open: 3R (1971)
- Wimbledon: 2R (1973)

Florence Guédy (born 7 December 1954) is a French former professional tennis player.

Guédy was a girls' singles finalist at the 1971 French Open. She played in six Federation Cup ties for France in the 1970s, which included a World Group quarter-final against the United States in 1974. Her best performance in a grand slam tournament was a quarter-finalist appearance in women' doubles at the 1974 French Open (with Rosie Darmon).

== See also ==
- List of France Federation Cup team representatives
