= Jenny Dimond =

Australian tennis player

- Country (sports): Australia
- Born: 13 November 1955 (age 69)

Singles

Grand Slam singles results
- Australian Open: 2R (1974)
- French Open: 1R (1976)
- Wimbledon: 4R (1975)
- US Open: 1R (1975)

Doubles

Grand Slam doubles results
- Australian Open: QF (1975)
- Wimbledon: 3R (1975)

Grand Slam mixed doubles results
- Wimbledon: 1R (1974)

Jenny Dimond (born 13 November 1955) is an Australian former professional tennis player.

Dimond comes from a sporting family in the Illawarra, associated more with New South Wales Rugby League (NSWRL). She is the daughter of rugby league international Bobby Dimond, who played for Western Suburbs. Her uncle Peter also played for Australia and Western Suburbs, while her cousin Craig played in the NSWRL, mostly for Cronulla.

While competing on the professional tour in the 1970s, Dimond featured in all four grand slam tournaments. She was a junior doubles champion at the 1973 Australian Open with Dianne Fromholtz and teamed up with her again to make the quarter-finals of the women's doubles at the 1975 Australian Open. In singles, she reached the fourth round of the 1975 Wimbledon Championships, playing as a qualifier. She lost her fourth round match to past champion Evonne Goolagong Cawley.
