= Nicole Hesse-Cazaux =

French tennis player (born 1948)

- Country (sports): France
- Born: 18 September 1948 (age 76)

Singles

Grand Slam singles results
- French Open: 1R (1969, 1974, 1975)

Doubles

Grand Slam doubles results
- French Open: 2R (1970)

Grand Slam mixed doubles results
- French Open: 2R (1970)

Nicole Hesse-Cazaux (born 18 September 1948) is a French former tennis player.

Hesse-Cazaux was a regular participant at the French Open and made three appearances in the singles main draw.

During her time in tennis she also competed under her maiden name Cazaux as well as Bîmes, from her marriage to tennis executive Christian Bîmes, with whom she had two daughters. She has since married former tennis player Yannick Hesse and they are the parents of Amandine Hesse, who competes on tour.
