= Patty Ann Reese =

American tennis player

- Full name: Patricia Ann Reese
- Country (sports): United States

Singles

Grand Slam singles results
- French Open: 2R (1974)
- Wimbledon: 3R (1975)
- US Open: 1R (1969, 1970, 1971)

Doubles

Grand Slam doubles results
- Wimbledon: 3R (1971)
- US Open: 1R (1969, 1970, 1971)

Grand Slam mixed doubles results
- Wimbledon: 3R (1971)

Patricia Ann Reese (born 1950s) is an American former professional tennis player.

Reese grew up in St. Petersburg, Florida, where her father worked as a general surgeon. She won national championships as a junior and competed on the international tour during the 1970s. In 1975 she reached the third round of the Wimbledon Championships as a qualifier. She has been married to politician J. Edward Meyer since 1979.
