= Chris Evert =

American former tennis player (born 1954)

- Evert in the 1980s
- Full name: Christine Marie Evert
- Country (sports): United States
- Residence: Fort Lauderdale, Florida, U.S.
- Born: December 21, 1954 (age 71) Fort Lauderdale, Florida, U.S.
- Height: 5 ft 6 in (1.68 m)
- Turned pro: 1972
- Retired: 1989
- Plays: Right-handed (two-handed backhand)
- Coach: Jimmy Evert; Dennis Ralston
- Prize money: $8,895,195
- Int. Tennis HoF: 1995 (member page)

Singles
- Career record: 1309–146 (89.97%)
- Career titles: 157
- Highest ranking: No. 1 (November 3, 1975)

Grand Slam singles results
- Australian Open: W (1982, 1984)
- French Open: W (1974, 1975, 1979, 1980, 1983, 1985, 1986)
- Wimbledon: W (1974, 1976, 1981)
- US Open: W (1975, 1976, 1977, 1978, 1980, 1982)

Other tournaments
- Tour Finals: W (1972, 1973, 1975, 1977)
- Olympic Games: 3R (1988)

Doubles
- Career record: 117–39
- Career titles: 32
- Highest ranking: No. 13 (September 12, 1988)

Grand Slam doubles results
- Australian Open: F (1988)
- French Open: W (1974, 1975)
- Wimbledon: W (1976)
- US Open: SF (1973, 1975, 1979)

Team competitions
- Fed Cup: W (1977, 1978, 1979, 1980, 1981, 1982, 1986, 1989)

Christine Marie Evert (Note: She was billed as Chris Evert-Lloyd from 1979 to 1987 during her marriage to fellow tennis player John Lloyd.) (born December 21, 1954) is an American former professional tennis player. One of the most successful players of all time, she was ranked as the world No. 1 in women's singles by the Women's Tennis Association (WTA) for 260 weeks (fourth-most of all time), and finished as the year-end No. 1 seven times: 1974–1978, 1980 and 1981. Evert won 157 singles titles, including 18 majors (among which a record seven French Open titles and a joint-record six US Open titles). Alongside Martina Navratilova, her greatest rival, Evert dominated women's tennis from the mid-1970s to the mid-1980s.

In singles, Evert reached the semifinals or better in 52 of the 56 majors she played, including at 34 consecutive majors entered from the 1971 US Open through the 1983 French Open. She never lost in the first or second round of a major, and lost in the third round only twice. Evert holds the record of most consecutive years (13) of winning at least one major title, and contested an all-time record 34 major women's singles finals. Evert's career winning percentage in singles matches of 89.97% (1309–146) is the second highest in the Open Era, for men or women. On clay courts, Evert's career winning percentage in singles matches of 94.55% (382–22) remains a WTA Tour record. She also won three major doubles titles, two partnering with Navratilova and one with Olga Morozova.

Evert served as president of the Women's Tennis Association for eleven years, 1975–76 and 1983–91. She was awarded the Philippe Chatrier award and inducted into the Hall of Fame. In later life, Evert was a coach and is now an analyst for ESPN, and has a line of tennis and active apparel.

== Early life and family ==
Evert was born in 1954 in Fort Lauderdale, Florida, to Colette (née Thompson) and Jimmy Evert, and raised in a committed Catholic household. She is a 1973 graduate of St. Thomas Aquinas High School in Fort Lauderdale. In 1992, she was inducted into the National High School Hall of Fame.

Evert's father was a professional tennis coach, and tennis was a way of life in his family. Chris and her sister Jeanne became professional tennis players.

== Tennis career ==
Evert began taking tennis lessons from her father Jimmy Evert when she was five years old. He was a professional tennis coach who had won the men's singles title at the Canadian Championships in 1947. By 1969, she had become the No. 1 ranked under-14 girl in the United States. Evert played her first senior tournament in that year also, reaching the semifinals in her hometown of Fort Lauderdale, Florida, losing to Mary-Ann Eisel in three sets. For years, this was the record for the furthest a player had reached in her first senior-level tournament. That record was broken when another Floridian, Jennifer Capriati, reached the final at Boca Raton in 1990. In 1970, Evert won the national 16-and-under championship and was invited to play in an eight-player clay-court tournament in Charlotte, North Carolina. The 15-year-old Evert defeated Françoise Dürr in the first round in straight sets before defeating Margaret Court 7–6, 7–6 in a semifinal. Court was the world No. 1 player and had just won the Grand Slam in singles. These results led to Evert's selection for the U.S. Wightman Cup team as the youngest player ever in the competition.

Evert made her Grand Slam tournament debut at age 16 at the 1971 US Open; she received an invitation after winning the national 16-and-under championship. After an easy straight-sets win over Edda Buding in the first round, she faced the American No. 4, Mary-Ann Eisel in the second round. With Eisel serving at 6–4, 6–5 (40–0) in the second set, Evert saved six match points before going on to win 4–6, 7–6, 6–1. She made two further comebacks from a set down, against fifth seed Dürr and Lesley Hunt, both seasoned professionals, before losing in straight sets to top seed Billie Jean King in a semifinal. This defeat ended a 46-match winning streak built up through a variety of professional and junior tour events.

In 1973, Evert was the runner-up at the French Open and the Wimbledon Championships. A year later she won both those events during her then-record 55-consecutive-match winning streak, which included eight other tournament wins. She ended the year with a 100–7 match record, winning 16 tournaments including two Grand Slams, having been a finalist in her first Australian Open, and having for a fourth straight year reached the semifinals at the US Open. She was chosen as the year-end number one by the leading tennis experts and authorities of the day – except Bud Collins.

For the next five years, Evert was the world's No.1 player. In 1975 she won her second French Open and the first of four straight US Open titles by defeating Cawley in a three-set final. Also in November of that year, the official WTA computer ranking system was instituted, with Evert being the first No. 1. In total, Evert logged 260 weeks (Note: Fourth all-time behind Steffi Graf (377), Martina Navratilova (332), and Serena Williams (309).) at number one. Ten years after she had first achieved the number-one spot, she regained it in November 1985 at the age of 30 years and 11 months. That made her the oldest woman to have reached WTA number one, a record that stood for 27 years until Serena Williams surpassed it in 2013.

Evert's domination of the women's game and her calm, steely demeanor on court earned her the nickname of the "Ice Maiden" of tennis. Throughout her career, Evert was ranked number one in the world at the end of seven different years by Tennis magazine, by World Tennis magazine and as well as a majority of other major tennis experts from 1974 through 1978, and in 1980 and 1981.

The 1976 season held a unique distinction for Evert, as this was the only time in her career where she won both Wimbledon and the US Open titles in the same year. She defeated Goolagong Cawley in a thrilling three-set final on grass and then dismantled her on clay at Forest Hills, losing just three games. However, Evert lost to Goolagong Cawley again in the final of the Virginia Slims Championships. In all, Evert won 26 of 39 matches with Cawley. Evert's 1976 performance earned her Sports Illustrated's title of Sportsman of the Year. She is the first woman to be the sole recipient of this honor, and is one of only four tennis players to receive it.

The years 1977 and 1978 saw Evert continue to dominate the women's game, winning two more US Opens. Evert won the final US Open played at Forest Hills on clay (1977) and the inaugural championship to be held on hard courts at Flushing Meadow (1978). She won 18 of 25 tournaments during this two-year period and had a match record of 126–7. Of particular note is that Evert skipped the French Open during these years (as well as 1976) to play in King's World TeamTennis. The other noteworthy event was Evert's three-set loss to eventual champion Wade in the semifinals of the 1977 Wimbledon Championships. It was Wimbledon's centenary year, coinciding with Queen Elizabeth II's Silver Jubilee as monarch.

Though she was successful on all surfaces, it was on clay courts where Evert was most dominant. Beginning in August 1973, she won 125 consecutive matches on clay, losing only eight sets throughout; this run continues to stand as the benchmark among both men and women players. The streak was broken on May 12, 1979, in a semifinal of the Italian Open when Evert lost to Tracy Austin in a third-set tiebreaker. Evert said after the match, "Not having the record will take some pressure off me, but I am not glad to have lost it." Evert rebounded with another clay court streak that reached 64 matches (including titles at the 1979 and 1980 French Open) before ending with a semifinal loss to eventual winner Hana Mandlíková at the 1981 French Open (a record of 189 victories in 191 matches on clay from 1973 to 1981).

Evert's record of seven French Open singles titles stood for 27 years until being broken in June 2013 by Rafael Nadal. She still holds the French Open singles title record for female players. Evert held the record for most clay court Grand Slam titles (10, with seven French Opens and all three US Opens played on clay in 1975–77) before Nadal won his 11th French Open championship in 2018. Three of her victories came in three-set finals against Navratilova. In 1975, Evert defeated Navratilova 2–6, 6–2, 6–1 to defend her title from the previous year. In 1985, Evert prevailed 6–3, 6–7, 7–5, a win that saw her capture the world No. 1 computer ranking for the fifth and final time.

Evert won at least one Grand Slam singles title a year for 13 consecutive years, from 1974 through 1986. During this period, Evert did not participate in the Australian Opens held from 1975 to 1980 and in 1983, or the French Opens from 1976 to 1978. The reasons for Evert's non-participation in the Australian Open during the years of her greatest dominance (she was ranked No.1 in the world five of the six years she was absent from the event between 1975 and 1980) was the relative decline in the status of this Grand Slam tournament during that period. Evert's absence from the French Open in 1976, 1977 and 1978 reflected the allure of World TeamTennis and the generally lesser significance that the top players attached to the traditional Slam events in the early years of the professional era. During this period of dominance (1975–80), she skipped ten Grand Slam tournaments.

Between September 1971 (her Grand Slam debut at the US Open) and June 1983 (her 12th visit to the Wimbledon Championships), Evert never failed to reach at least the semi-finals of the 34 Grand Slam singles events she entered. This string, however, was broken in the third round at Wimbledon in 1983 when the All England Club refused Evert's request to delay her match with Kathy Jordan to recover from food poisoning. This defeat also ended her attempt to be the holder of all four Grand Slam singles titles simultaneously, as Evert was then holder of the '82 Australian, U.S., and the '83 French titles. In 56 Grand Slam singles events entered from 1971 to 1989, Evert fell short of the semifinals a mere four times (1983 Wimbledon 3rd round; 1987 US Open quarterfinal; 1988 French Open 3rd round; 1989 US Open quarterfinal).

In total, of the record 34 Grand Slam finals reached, Evert won 18 Grand Slam singles titles: seven at the French Open (record for female), six at the US Open (an open era record, male or female, tied with Serena Williams), three at Wimbledon, and two at the Australian Open (both on grass). In addition, Evert won three Grand Slam doubles titles.

Evert played a reduced schedule in 1989 and retired from the professional tour after the US Open. Upon her retirement, she had amassed 18 Grand Slam singles titles (at the time, an Open Era record, male or female), won 157 singles titles (at the time, the record for male or female) and 32 doubles titles. Evert won the WTA Tour Championships four times and helped the United States win the Fed Cup eight times. Evert's last match was a 6–3, 6–2 win over Conchita Martínez in the final of the 1989 Fed Cup.

=== Rivalries ===
During her career versus selected rivals, Evert was: 40–6 against Virginia Wade, 37–43 against Martina Navratilova, 26–13 against Evonne Goolagong Cawley, 24–0 against Virginia Ruzici, 23–1 against Sue Barker, 22–0 against Betty Stöve, 22–1 against Rosemary Casals, 21–7 against Hana Mandlíková, 20–1 against Wendy Turnbull, 19–7 against Billie Jean King (winning the last 11 matches with a loss of only two sets), 19–3 against Pam Shriver, 18–2 against Kerry Melville Reid, 17–2 against Manuela Maleeva-Fragniere, 17–2 against Helena Suková, 17–3 against Andrea Jaeger, 16–3 against Dianne Fromholtz Balestrat, 15–0 against Olga Morozova, 13–0 against Françoise Dürr, 9–4 against Margaret Court, 8–9 against Tracy Austin, 7–0 against Mary Joe Fernández, 6–3 against Gabriela Sabatini, 6–5 against Nancy Richey Gunter (winning the last six matches), 6–8 against Steffi Graf (losing the last eight matches) and 2–1 against Monica Seles.

=== Awards and recognitions ===
Evert was voted the Associated Press Female Athlete of the Year on four occasions and was the first female athlete to be Sports Illustrated magazine's sole recipient of "Sportswoman of the Year" award in 1976. In April 1985, she was voted the "Greatest Woman Athlete of the Last 25 Years" by the Women's Sports Foundation. Evert served as president of the Women's Tennis Association during 1975–76, and from 1983 to 1991.

In 1995, she was the fourth player ever to be unanimously elected into the International Tennis Hall of Fame following a worldwide ballot of 185 sports journalists. In 1997, the International Tennis Federation (ITF) presented her with its highest accolade – the Philippe Chatrier Award – for her contributions to tennis, whilst 1999 saw Evert rated No. 50 among ESPN's Greatest North American athletes of the 20th century. In 2005, Tennis named her fourth on its list of 40 Greatest Players of the Tennis era.

In 2012, Tennis Channel conducted a poll of players and experts to determine the 100 Greatest Players of all time, in which Evert ranked ninth overall, and fourth highest among women (finishing behind Graf, Navratilova, and Court in that order.) In June 2013, Evert was awarded a special merit from the International Tennis Hall of Fame. They presented her their gold ring in recognition of her outstanding achievements both on and off the tennis court.

== Playing style ==
Evert was a baseline player who is credited with revolutionizing the sport of tennis. She was known for her consistent, counterpunching game, with her being described retrospectively by the International Tennis Hall of Fame as a "human backboard". Evert was one of the first players to play exclusively from the baseline, typically approaching the net to retrieve short balls only; towards the end of her career, however, Evert would approach the net to end points more frequently. Evert's forehand was hit flat, with consistent depth and power, penetrating deep into the court; towards the end of her career with the development of graphite technology, she would begin to apply more topspin to her forehand. Evert was one of the first women who successfully used a double-handed backhand on the WTA tour, which did not have the extra reach that a one-handed backhand afforded, but did provide power and consistency that was previously unseen on the tour, and would later become the norm for female tennis players.

Evert would not typically hit large numbers of winners, instead predicating her game on the retrieval of balls with devastating accuracy, and keeping unforced errors to a minimum. Evert did not possess a powerful serve; however, it was reliable and accurate. Evert possessed delicate touch, and had one of the most effective drop shots at the time. Playing in an era where serve and volleying was the dominant style of play, Evert was able to hit difficult passing shots with ease, pushing her opponents behind the baseline, and preventing them from rushing the net. Evert's greatest strengths on court were her speed, detailed footwork, court coverage, fitness, consistency, and mental fortitude. Despite having success on all surfaces, Evert's favorite surface was clay, where the high bounce and lower speed afforded by the surface allowed her to execute her measured, defensive style of play with tremendous success; this is highlighted by her career 382–22 (94.6%) winning record on the surface. Due to her composure, mental toughness, and elegant style of play, Evert was known as the "Ice Princess".

== Personal life ==
Before she won her first Grand Slam event, Evert signed a contract with Puritan Fashions to endorse a line of sportswear. Company president Carl Rosen thought so highly of her that he named a yearling racehorse Chris Evert in her honor. The horse went on to win the 1974 U.S. Filly Triple Crown, was voted the Eclipse Award for Outstanding 3-Year-Old Filly, and was inducted into the National Museum of Racing and Hall of Fame.

In the 1970s, Evert's romance with the top men's player Jimmy Connors captured the public's imagination, particularly after they both won the 1974 singles titles at Wimbledon. Evert and Connors also occasionally played mixed doubles together. They became engaged when she was 19 and a wedding was planned for November 8, 1974. The romance did not last, and the wedding was called off. In May 2013, Connors wrote in his autobiography that Evert had been pregnant with their child but had decided to terminate the pregnancy. Evert replied that she was "extremely disappointed that he (Connors) used the book to misrepresent a private matter".

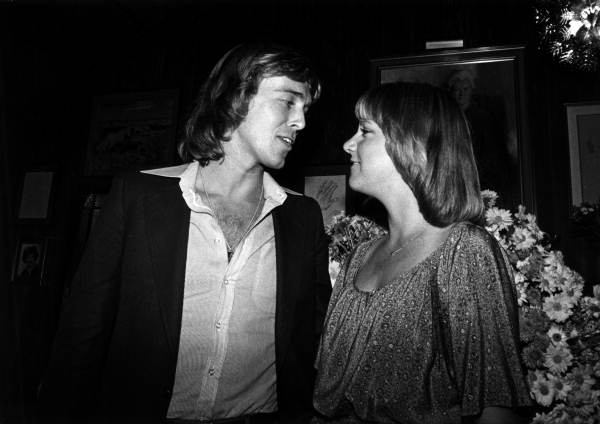
John Lloyd and Evert in Fort Lauderdale, circa 1978

In 1979, Evert married British tennis player John Lloyd and changed her name to Chris Evert Lloyd. After her affair with British singer and actor Adam Faith, the couple separated, but reconciled and chronicled their marriage in a biography Lloyd On Lloyd co-authored by Carol Thatcher. The couple divorced in April 1987.

In 1988, Evert married American downhill skier Andy Mill, who had been introduced to her by Martina Navratilova. They have three sons. On November 13, 2006, Evert filed for divorce. The divorce was finalized on December 4, 2006, with Evert paying Mill a settlement of US$7 million in cash and securities.

On June 28, 2008, Evert married her third husband, Australian golfer Greg Norman in the Bahamas. On October 2, 2009, they announced they were separating after 15 months. Their divorce was finalized on December 8, 2009.

In 2021, Evert became a supporter of the new Women's Sports Policy Working Group, formed in opposition to President Joe Biden's executive order that modified Title IX of Education Amendments of 1972 to mandate inclusion of transgender female athletes on women's teams in sports at schools that receive federal funding.

In 2020 Evert's sister, Jeanne, died of ovarian cancer, at the age of 62, following a two-year illness. Chris Evert underwent a preventive hysterectomy after learning she carried the BRCA gene mutation. Cancer was uncovered in her resected fallopian tubes in 2022. In May 2022, it was reported that Evert had completed chemotherapy treatment for her ovarian cancer. She said her doctor had told her there was a 90% chance the cancer would never return as it had been diagnosed early. In December 2023, she announced she had been diagnosed with a recurrence of cancer and was undergoing treatment again, which the following year was announced as having been successful. In June 2026, Evert announced her ovarian cancer had returned and that she would start chemotherapy again.

== Current work ==
Evert owns the Evert Tennis Academy with her brother John in Boca Raton, Florida and helps coach the Saint Andrew's School's high school tennis team. She contributes to Tennis magazine, of which she is also publisher. In June 2011, she joined ESPN as a tennis commentator for Grand Slam tournaments. In 2015, she launched a line of tennis and active apparel in collaboration with Tail Activewear called Chrissie by Tail. She was also a member of the Athlete Advisory Committee for the 2019 Aurora Games.

On June 10, 2023, Evert presented the 2023 Women's French Open Singles tournament trophy to Iga Świątek at Roland-Garros. Evert had won one of her own seven French Open titles forty years earlier in 1983.

== Career statistics ==
=== Grand Slam singles performance timeline ===
Key
**W**	F	SF	QF	#R	RR	Q#	DNQ	A	NH

(W) winner; (F) finalist; (SF) semifinalist; (QF) quarterfinalist; (#R) rounds 4, 3, 2, 1; (RR) round-robin stage; (Q#) qualification round; (DNQ) did not qualify; (A) absent; (NH) not held; (SR) strike rate (events won / competed); (W–L) win–loss record.

Tournament	1971	1972	1973	1974	1975	1976	1977		1978	1979	1980	1981	1982	1983	1984	1985	1986	1987	1988	1989	Career SR	W-L
Australian Open	A	A	A	F	A	A	A	A	A	A	A	F	**W**	A	**W**	F	NH	A	F	A	**2 / 6**	**30–4**
French Open	A	A	F	**W**	**W**	A	A		A	**W**	**W**	SF	SF	**W**	F	**W**	**W**	SF	3R	A	**7 / 13**	**72–6**
Wimbledon	A	SF	F	**W**	SF	**W**	SF		F	F	F	**W**	F	3R	F	F	SF	SF	SF	SF	**3 / 18**	**96–15**
US Open	SF	SF	SF	SF	**W**	**W**	**W**		**W**	F	**W**	SF	**W**	F	F	SF	SF	QF	SF	QF	**6 / 19**	**101–12**
SR	0 / 1	0 / 2	0 / 3	2 / 4	2 / 3	2 / 2	1 / 2		1 / 2	1 / 3	2 / 3	1 / 4	2 / 4	1 / 3	1 / 4	1 / 4	1 / 3	0 / 3	0 / 4	0 / 2	18 / 56	299–37
Year-end ranking		**3**	**3**	**1**	**1**	**1**	**1**		**2**	**2**	**1**	**1**	**2**	**2**	**2**	**2**	**2**	**3**	**3**	10 (Note: Evert's last major appearance was at the 1989 US Open, at which time she was ranked world No. 4. She followed this with a 4–0 record at the 1989 Federation Cup in October.)		

=== Records ===
- These records were attained in Open Era of tennis.
- Records in **bold** indicate peerless achievements.
- As Evert elected not to participate in a number of Grand Slam tournaments, the term "consecutive" is inexact. In 19 seasons of professional tennis, Evert competed in all four Grand Slam tournaments in the same year only six times.

Time span	Selected Grand Slam tournament records	Players matched
1973 French Open — 1988 Australian Open	34 finals overall	**Stands alone**
1971 US Open — 1983 French Open	34 consecutive semifinals in tournaments played* (Note: Evert's consecutive Grand Slam semifinals record was attained in non-consecutive Grand Slam tournaments; she skipped 14 Grand Slam tournaments during her streak. Martina Navratilova holds the all-time consecutive Grand Slam semifinals record at 18.)	**Stands alone**
1974 French Open — 1986 French Open	13 consecutive years of winning 1+ title	**Stands alone**
1974 French Open — 1981 Wimbledon	3 different Grand Slam tournaments won without losing a set French Open (1), US Open (3), Wimbledon (1)	Steffi Graf; Lindsay Davenport; Serena Williams
1984 French Open — 1984 Australian Open	Reached all four finals in a calendar year	Margaret Court; Martina Navratilova; Steffi Graf; Monica Seles; Martina Hingis; Justine Henin
1971 US Open — 1989 US Open	Reached 52 semifinals (92.8%) and 54 quarterfinals (96.4%) out of 56 Grand Slams entered	**Stands alone**
1971 US Open — 1989 US Open	Only player to reach six straight singles semi-finals or better, in her first attempts, at each of the four majors. (Note: Evert reached the semifinals or better in her first 6 Australian Opens, 12 French Opens, 11 Wimbledon Championships, and 16 US Opens. All-time record for both male and female players.)	**Stands alone**
1974 Australian Open — 1985 US Open	Only player to reach singles semifinals of all four majors in the same calendar year five times	**Stands alone**
1973 French Open — 1988 Australian Open	Only player to reach five consecutive finals of each major	**Stands alone**
1976 Wimbledon — 1976 US Open	100% (13–0) match winning percentage in 1 season	Margaret Court; Billie Jean King; Steffi Graf; Monica Seles; Serena Williams

Grand Slam tournaments	Time span	Records at each Grand Slam tournament	Players matched
French Open	1974–1986	7 titles overall	**Stands alone**
French Open	1973–1986	9 finals overall	Steffi Graf
French Open	1983–1986	four consecutive finals	Martina Navratilova; Steffi Graf
Wimbledon	1973, 1978–1980, 1982, 1984, 1985	7 runner-up finishes	**Stands alone**
US Open	1975–1982	6 titles overall	Serena Williams
US Open	1975–1978	Four consecutive titles	**Stands alone**
US Open	1975–1979	31 consecutive match wins	**Stands alone**
US Open	1975–1979	46 consecutive sets won	**Stands alone**
US Open	1975–1977	Won US Open on clay	**Stands alone**
US Open	1975–1978	Only female player to win titles on two different surfaces	**Stands alone**
US Open	1975–1980	6 consecutive finals	**Stands alone**
US Open	1971–1986	16 consecutive semifinals	**Stands alone**
US Open	1976–1978	3 titles won without losing a set	Serena Williams
US Open	1971–1989	89.38% (101–12) match winning percentage	**Stands alone**
Australian Open	1984, 1988	Won title on grass and reached final on hard	**Stands alone**
Australian Open	1974–1988	14 year gap between first and last finals	Serena Williams; Venus Williams

Time span	Other selected records	Players matched
1971–1988	122 titles outdoor (Open era)	Stands alone
1971–1988	70 clay-court titles (Open era)	Stands alone
1974–1979	125 consecutive clay-court match victories (Note: This is the all-time record for consecutive match victories on a single surface for both male and female players.)	Stands alone
1972–1988	17 consecutive years ranked inside the top 3	Stands alone
1976–1986	8 Fed Cup titles	Stands alone
1972–1989	94.28% (316–20) clay-court match percentage	Stands alone
1971–1984	First player to reach 1000 career match wins	Stands alone
1971–1989	First player to reach 150 career tournament wins	Stands alone
1971–1976	First female to reach one million dollars in career prize money	Stands alone

== See also ==
- WTA Tour records
- List of WTA number 1 ranked singles tennis players
- List of female tennis players
- List of tennis rivalries
- Tennis records of the Open Era – Women's singles
- Open Era tennis records – women's singles

== Notes ==
Sporting positions
Preceded by — Evonne Goolagong; Martina Navratilova; Martina Navratilova; Martina Navratilova; Tracy Austin; Martina Navratilova; Martina Navratilova; Martina Navratilova	World No. 1 November 3, 1975 – April 26, 1976; May 10, 1976 – July 9, 1978; January 14, 1979 – January 27, 1979; February 25, 1979 – April 15, 1979; June 25, 1979 – September 9, 1979; November 18, 1980 – May 2, 1982; May 17, 1982 – June 13, 1982; June 10, 1985 – October 13, 1985; October 28, 1985 – November 24, 1985	Succeeded by Evonne Goolagong; Martina Navratilova; Martina Navratilova; Martina Navratilova; Martina Navratilova; Martina Navratilova; Martina Navratilova; Martina Navratilova; Martina Navratilova
Awards and achievements
Preceded by — Martina Navratilova	ITF World Champion; 1978; 1980–1981	Succeeded by Martina Navratilova; Martina Navratilova
Preceded by Hanni Wenzel	United Press International; Athlete of the Year; 1981	Succeeded by Marita Koch
Preceded by Jack Nicklaus	BBC Overseas Sports Personality of the Year; 1981	Succeeded by Jimmy Connors
Preceded by Evelyn Ashford	Flo Hyman Memorial Award; 1990	Succeeded by Diana Golden-Brosnihan
Preceded by Margaret Court	Most Career Grand Slam Singles Titles (Open Era); July 4, 1981 – June 8, 1996 (shared w/ Martina Navratilova from July 7, 1990 – June 8, 1996)	Succeeded by Steffi Graf
