= 1974 French Open =

- Date: 3–16 June 1974
- Edition: 73
- Category: 44th Grand Slam (ITF)
- Draw: 132S / 64D / 32X
- Surface: Clay / outdoor
- Location: Paris (XVI^{e}), France
- Venue: Stade Roland Garros

Champions

Men's singles
- (Sweden) Björn Borg

Women's singles
- (United States) Chris Evert

Men's doubles
- (Australia) Dick Crealy / (Australia) Onny Parun

Women's doubles
- (United States) Chris Evert / (Soviet Union) Olga Morozova

Mixed doubles
- (Czechoslovakia) Martina Navratilova / (Colombia) Iván Molina
← 1973 ·	French Open	· 1975 →

The 1974 French Open was a tennis tournament that took place on the outdoor clay courts at the Stade Roland Garros in Paris, France. The tournament ran from 3 June until 16 June. It was the 73rd staging of the French Open, and the second Grand Slam tennis event of 1974.

== Connors and Goolagong ==
World no. 2 Jimmy Connors and Evonne Goolagong were banned from playing in the 1974 French Open by Philippe Chatrier, president of the French Tennis Federation (FTF), because both had signed contracts to play in the World Team Tennis league in the United States. (Note: Connors signed to play for the Baltimore Banners and Goolagong played for the Pittsburgh Triangles.) The schedule of the inaugural edition of the World Team Tennis conflicted with the dates of several European spring tournaments including the Italian and French Open. Both players had won the singles title at the 1974 Australian Open and were thus denied the opportunity to play for the Grand Slam that year. (Note: Connors would indeed go on to win the 1974 Wimbledon Championships and 1974 U.S. Open.) Connors and Goolagong filed a suit at a French court seeking the right to participate but this was rejected on the grounds that there was no need for emergency action. In September 1974 they sued the FTF seeking $200,000 in damages each as compensation for the ban. This wouldn't be until the 2017 French Open that both of the defending champions of that year's Australian Open also absent from the competition.

== Finals ==
=== Men's singles ===
(Sweden) Björn Borg (Note: Borg became the first Swedish tennis player (male or female) to win a Grand Slam singles title in the open era. In 1957 Sven Davidsson won Sweden's first Grand Slam singles title at French Open.) defeated (Spain) Manuel Orantes, 2–6, 6–7^{(4–7)}, 6–0, 6–1, 6–1

- It was Borg's 1st career Grand Slam title.

=== Women's singles ===
(United States) Chris Evert defeated (Soviet Union) Olga Morozova, (Note: Morozova was the first player (male or female) from the Soviet Union to reach a Grand Slam final in the Open Era.) 6–1, 6–2

- It was Evert's 1st career Grand Slam title.

=== Men's doubles ===
(Australia) Dick Crealy / (New Zealand) Onny Parun defeated (United States) Bob Lutz / (United States) Stanley Smith, 6–3, 6–2, 3–6, 5–7, 6–1

=== Women's doubles ===
(United States) Chris Evert / (Soviet Union) Olga Morozova defeated (France) Gail Sherriff Chanfreau / (West Germany) Katja Burgemeister Ebbinghaus, 6–4, 2–6, 6–1

=== Mixed doubles ===
(Czechoslovakia) Martina Navratilova / (Colombia) Iván Molina defeated (Mexico) Rosie Reyes Darmon / (Mexico) Marcello Lara, 6–3, 6–3

== Prize money ==
Event		W	F	SF	QF	4R	3R	2R	1R
Singles	Men	FF120,000	FF60,000	FF30,000	FF15,000	FF7,000	FF4,000	FF2,000	FF1,000
Singles	Women	FF40,000	FF20,000	FF10,000	FF5,000	-	FF4,000	FF1,500	FF1,000

Total prize money for the event was FF407,000.

== Notes ==
Preceded by 1974 Australian Open	Grand Slams	Succeeded by 1974 Wimbledon Championships
