= Antonella Rosa =

Italian tennis player (1957–2020)

- Country (sports): Italy
- Born: 1 February 1957
- Died: 2020 (aged 63)
- Plays: Ambidextrous

Singles

Grand Slam singles results
- French Open: 3R (1976)
Medal record
Mediterranean Games
Bronze medal – third place	1979 Split	Women's doubles

Antonella Rosa (1 February 1957 – 2020) was an Italian professional tennis player.

Rosa, a native of the Liguria region of Italy, had an unusual technique of using a forehand on both sides of her body. She stopped hitting a backhand on the recommendation of a coach, due to an injury sustained to her right hand.

While competing on tour in the 1970s she was at her height the fourth ranked player in Italy. She reached the third round of the 1976 French Open and was a doubles bronze medalist at the 1979 Mediterranean Games.
