= Mirka Koželuhová =

Czech tennis player

- Full name: Miroslava Bendlová-Koželuhová
- Country (sports): Czechoslovakia
- Born: 16 December 1951 (age 73); Prague, Czechoslovakia

Singles

Grand Slam singles results
- French Open: QF (1978)

Doubles

Grand Slam doubles results
- French Open: 2R (1975)

Miroslava "Mirka" Koželuhová (born 16 December 1951) is a Czech former professional tennis player. She has also been known by her married name Mirka Bendlová.

== Biography ==
Koželuhová is the great-niece of tennis player Karel Koželuh, who is an inductee to the International Tennis Hall of Fame.

During her career she featured in four editions of the French Open, the first in 1973. The 1973 French Open was also the debut of her then compatriot Martina Navratilova and they played each other in the first round, Navratilova emerging victorious.

In 1975 she was a member of the Czechoslovak squad which won the country's first Federation Cup title, then sat out of international tennis for two years when the authorities took away her passport as a reaction to Martina Navratilova's defection to the United States. During this time she got married and had a child.

She made a comeback in 1978 when she was allowed to compete in the French Open and had to win her way through qualifying as she had no ranking points. Once in the main draw she had the best performance on her career, reaching the quarter-finals.
