= 1974 Australian Open =

- Date: 26 December 1973 – 1 January 1974
- Edition: 62nd
- Category: Grand Slam (ITF)
- Surface: Grass
- Location: Melbourne, Victoria, Australia
- Venue: Kooyong Lawn Tennis Club

Champions

Men's singles
- (United States) Jimmy Connors

Women's singles
- (Australia) Evonne Goolagong

Men's doubles
- (Australia) Ross Case / (Australia) Geoff Masters

Women's doubles
- (Australia) Evonne Goolagong / (United States) Peggy Michel
- Australian Open

The 1974 Australian Open was a tennis tournament played on outdoor grass courts at the Kooyong Lawn Tennis Club in Melbourne in Australia and was held from 26 December 1973 to 1 January 1974. It was the 62nd edition of the Australian Open and the first Grand Slam tournament of the year.

== Seniors ==
=== Men's singles ===
(United States) Jimmy Connors defeated (Australia) Phil Dent, 7–6^{(9–7)}, 6–4, 4–6, 6–3

=== Women's singles ===
(Australia) Evonne Goolagong defeated (United States) Chris Evert, 7–6, 4–6, 6–0

=== Men's doubles ===
(Australia) Ross Case / (Australia) Geoff Masters defeated (Australia) Syd Ball / (Australia) Bob Giltinan, 3–6, 7–6, 6–2

=== Women's doubles ===
(Australia) Evonne Goolagong / (United States) Peggy Michel defeated (Australia) Kerry Harris / (Australia) Kerry Melville, 7–5, 6–3

=== Mixed doubles ===
Competition not held between 1970 and 1986.

Preceded by 1973 US Open	Grand Slams	Succeeded by 1974 French Open
