= Michelle Rodríguez (tennis) =

French and Chilean tennis player

- Full name: Michelle Boulle-Rodríguez
- Country (sports): France; Chile

Singles

Grand Slam singles results
- Australian Open: 1R (1966)
- French Open: 3R (1962, 1964, 1968)
- Wimbledon: 3R (1965)
- US Open: 2R (1964)

Doubles

Grand Slam doubles results
- Australian Open: 1R (1966)
- French Open: 2R (1967, 1970, 1971, 1974)
- Wimbledon: 2R (1970)

Grand Slam mixed doubles results
- Australian Open: 1R (1966)
- French Open: 3R (1970, 1971)
- Wimbledon: 3R (1967, 1968, 1973, 1974, 1980)

Michelle Boulle-Rodríguez is a French and Chilean former professional tennis player.

When she started her career she was known as Michelle Boulle and represented France, then married tennis player Patricio Rodríguez in 1966 and became a naturalised Chilean.

Rodríguez played three ties for the Chile Federation Cup team, one in 1968 and another two in 1974. She won all three of her singles rubbers and lost all three doubles matches that she played.

During her career, she featured in the main draws of all four grand slam tournaments. Most of her singles appearances came in the 1960s, and from the 1970s, she primarily played doubles.
