= 1976 in tennis =

This page covers all the important events in the sport of tennis in 1976. It provides the results of notable tournaments throughout the year on both the men's and the women's tennis circuits.

== Australian Open ==
Category	Champion(s)	Finalist(s)	Score
Men's singles	(Australia) Mark Edmondson	(Australia) John Newcombe	6–7, 6–3, 7–6, 6–1 (Note: It was Edmondson's 1st and only career Grand Slam singles title. Edmondson is the lowest ranked player ever to win a Grand Slam event.)
Women's singles	(Australia) Evonne Goolagong	(Czechoslovakia) Renáta Tomanová	6–2, 6–2 (Note: It was Goolagong's 5th career Grand Slam singles title and her 3rd title at the Australian Open.)
Men's doubles	(Australia) John Newcombe (Australia) Tony Roche	(Australia) Ross Case (Australia) Geoff Masters	7–6, 6–4
Women's doubles	(Australia) Evonne Goolagong (Australia) Helen Gourlay	(Australia) Lesley Turner Bowrey (Czechoslovakia) Renáta Tomanová	8–1 (Note: It was Goolagong's 5th career Grand Slam doubles title and her 4th title at the Australian Open.) (Note: It was Gourlay's 2nd career Grand Slam doubles title and her 2nd title at the Australian Open.)
Mixed doubles	No competition between 1970 and 1986.		

== French Open ==
Category	Champion(s)	Finalist(s)	Score
Men's singles	(Italy) Adriano Panatta	(United States) Harold Solomon	6–1, 6–4, 4–6, 7–6^{(7–3)} (Note: It was Panatta's 1st (and only) career Grand Slam title.)
Women's singles	(United Kingdom) Sue Barker	(Czechoslovakia) Renáta Tomanová	6–2, 0–6, 6–2 (Note: It was Barker's 1st (and only) career Grand Slam title.)
Men's doubles	(United States) Frederick McNair (United States) Sherwood Stewart	(United States) Brian Gottfried (Mexico) Raúl Ramírez	7–6^{(8-6)}, 6–3, 6–1
Women's doubles	(Uruguay) Fiorella Bonicelli (France) Gail Sherriff Chanfreau Lovera	(United States) Kathleen Harter (West Germany) Helga Niessen Masthoff	6–4, 1–6, 6–3
Mixed doubles	(South Africa) Ilana Kloss (Australia) Kim Warwick	(South Africa) Delina Boshoff (Rhodesia) Colin Dowdeswell	5–7, 7–6, 6–2

== Wimbledon ==
Category	Champion(s)	Finalist(s)	Score
Men's singles	(Sweden) Björn Borg	(Romania) Ilie Năstase	6–4, 6–2, 9–7
Women's singles	(United States) Chris Evert	(Australia) Evonne Goolagong Cawley	6–3, 4–6, 8–6
Men's doubles	(United States) Brian Gottfried (Mexico) Raúl Ramírez	(Australia) Ross Case (Australia) Geoff Masters	3–6, 6–3, 8–6, 2–6, 7–5
Women's doubles	(United States) Chris Evert (United States) Martina Navratilova	(United States) Billie Jean King (Netherlands) Betty Stöve	6–1, 3–6, 7–5
Mixed doubles	(Australia) Tony Roche (France) Françoise Dürr	(United States) Dick Stockton (United States) Rosie Casals	6–3, 2–6, 7–5

== US Open ==
Category	Champion(s)	Finalist(s)	Score
Men's singles	(United States) Jimmy Connors	(Sweden) Björn Borg	6–4, 3–6, 7–6^{(11-9)}, 6–4 (Note: It was Connors's 4th career Grand Slam title, and his 2nd US Open title.)
Women's singles	(United States) Chris Evert	(Australia) Evonne Goolagong Cawley	6–3, 6–0 (Note: It was Evert's 6th career Grand Slam title, and her 2nd (consecutive) US Open title.)
Men's doubles	(Netherlands) Tom Okker (United States) Marty Riessen	(Australia) Paul Kronk (Australia) Cliff Letcher	6–4, 6–4
Women's doubles	(South Africa) Delina Boshoff (South Africa) Ilana Kloss	(Soviet Union) Olga Morozova (United Kingdom) Virginia Wade	6–1, 6–4
Mixed doubles	(United States) Billie Jean King (Australia) Phil Dent	(Netherlands) Betty Stöve (South Africa) Frew McMillan	3–6, 6–2, 7–5
