= 1976 U.S. Clay Court Championships – Women's singles =

Women's singles
- 1976 U.S. Clay Court Championships

Final
- Champion: (United States) Kathy May
- Runner-up: (South Africa) Brigitte Cuypers
- Score: 6–4, 4–6, 6–2

Events
Singles	men	women
Doubles	men	women
← 1975 ·	U.S. Clay Court Championships	· 1977 →

Chris Evert was the defending champion but had clashing commitments in World TeamTennis. Eleventh-seed Kathy May won the title and $6,000 first-prize money, defeating Brigitte Cuypers in the final.

== Seeds ==
A champion seed is indicated in bold text while text in italics indicates the round in which that seed was eliminated.

1. (Australia) Lesley Hunt (quarterfinals)
2. (Australia) Cynthia Doerner (third round)
3. (United States) Janet Newberry (second round)
4. (South Africa) Linky Boshoff (quarterfinals)
5. (United States) Marcie Louie (third round)
6. (West Germany) Iris Riedel (second round)
7. (United States) Kathy Kuykendall (third round)
8. (West Germany) Helga Masthoff (semifinals)
9. (South Africa) Marise Kruger (first round)
10. (South Africa) Brigitte Cuypers (final)
11. (United States) **Kathy May (champion)**
12. (United States) Valerie Ziegenfuss (second round)

== Draw ==
=== Key ===
- Q = Qualifier
- WC = Wild card
- LL = Lucky loser
- Alt = Alternate
- SE = Special exempt
- PR = Protected ranking
- ITF = ITF entry
- JE = Junior exempt
- w/o = Walkover
- r = Retired
- d = Defaulted
- SR = Special ranking

=== Finals ===
Quarterfinals
1	(Australia) Lesley Hunt	3	**6**	3
11	**(United States) Kathy May**	**6**	3	**6**
(United States) Mary Struthers	2	0
**(Uruguay) Fiorella Bonicelli**	**6**	**6**
8	**(West Germany) Helga Masthoff**	**6**	**6**
4	(South Africa) Linky Boshoff	4	4
10	**(South Africa) Brigitte Cuypers**	**6**	**7**
(United States) Laura duPont	2	6

Semifinals
11	**(United States) Kathy May**	**6**	**6**
(Uruguay) Fiorella Bonicelli	3	3
8	(West Germany) Helga Masthoff	3	5
10	**(South Africa) Brigitte Cuypers**	**6**	**7**

Final
11	**(United States) Kathy May**	**6**	4	**6**
10	(South Africa) Brigitte Cuypers	4	**6**	2

=== Top half ===
==== Section 1 ====
First round

Second round
1	**(Australia) L Hunt**	**6**	**6**
(Belgium) M Gurdal	1	1
Q	**(United States) B Jordan**	**6**	**6**
(United States) M Hamm	4	2
5	**(United States) M Louie**	**6**	2	**7**
(United States) L Tenney	1	**6**	5
11	**(United States) K May**	**6**	**6**
(United States) B Bruning	3	4

Third round
1	**(Australia) L Hunt**	**6**	**6**
Q	(United States) B Jordan	3	0
5	(United States) M Louie	1	r
11	**(United States) K May**	**6**

Quarterfinals
1	(Australia) L Hunt	3	**6**	3
11	**(United States) K May**	**6**	3	**6**

==== Section 2 ====
First round
3	**(Australia) J Newberry**	3	**7**	**6**
(United States) C Martinez	**6**	5	3
(United States) K Harter	2	6
**(United States) M Struthers**	**6**	**7**
**(West Germany) H Eisterlehner**	**6**	4	**6**
9	(South Africa) M Kruger	1	**6**	1
(United Kingdom) G Coles	2	3
**(Australia) W Turnbull**	**6**	**6**
Q	(United States) Vickie Kerr	3	4
**(Romania) V Ruzici**	**6**	**6**
7	**(United States) K Kuykendall**	**6**	**6**
Q	(United States) C Reynolds	3	1
(France) G Chanfreau	2	1
**(Uruguay) F Bonicelli**	**6**	**6**
(United States) B Nagelsen	4	3
**(Romania) F Mihai**	**6**	**6**

Second round
3	(Australia) J Newberry	4	1
**(United States) M Struthers**	**6**	**6**
(West Germany) H Eisterlehner	1	0
**(Australia) W Turnbull**	**6**	**6**
(Romania) V Ruzici	2	**6**	1
7	**(United States) K Kuykendall**	**6**	4	**6**
**(Uruguay) F Bonicelli**	**6**	**6**
(Romania) F Mihai	2	3

Third round
**(United States) M Struthers**	**6**	2	**6**
(Australia) W Turnbull	2	**6**	3
7	(United States) K Kuykendall	2	4
**(Uruguay) F Bonicelli**	**6**	**6**

Quarterfinals
(United States) M Struthers	2	0
**(Uruguay) F Bonicelli**	**6**	**6**

=== Bottom half ===
==== Section 3 ====
First round
Q	**(France) F Guédy**	2	**6**	**6**
(United States) S Stap	**6**	4	3
Q	(United States) M O'Keefe	**6**	3	2
8	**(West Germany) H Masthoff**	1	**6**	**6**
(United States) R Gerulaitis	3	4
**(South Africa) I Kloss**	**6**	**6**
(United States) S Mehmedbasich	1	4
12	**(United States) V Ziegenfuss**	**6**	**6**
(United States) S Walsh	2	**7**	2
**(United States) J Metcalf**	**6**	6	**6**
**(Romania) M Simionescu**	**6**	**6**
(United States) L Thomas	2	1
Q	(Australia) P Whytcross	1	4
**(United States) J Evert**	**6**	**6**
(Japan) N Sato	3	3
4	**(South Africa) L Boshoff**	**6**	**6**

Second round
Q	(France) F Guédy	1	1
8	**(West Germany) H Masthoff**	**6**	**6**
**(South Africa) I Kloss**	2	**6**	**6**
12	(United States) V Ziegenfuss	**6**	3	0
**(United States) J Metcalf**	**7**	0	**6**
(Romania) M Simionescu	6	**6**	2
(United States) J Evert	4	1
4	**(South Africa) L Boshoff**	**6**	**6**

Third round
8	**(West Germany) H Masthoff**	**6**	**6**
(South Africa) I Kloss	1	2
(United States) J Metcalf	3	5
4	**(South Africa) L Boshoff**	**6**	**7**

Quarterfinals
8	**(West Germany) H Masthoff**	**6**	**6**
4	(South Africa) L Boshoff	4	4

==== Section 4 ====
First round

Second round
(United States) R Stark	5	0
10	**(South Africa) B Cuypers**	**7**	**6**
Q	**(United Kingdom) J Fayter**	**6**	**6**
6	(West Germany) I Riedel	4	0
**(United States) L duPont**	**7**	**6**
Q	(France) R Darmon	5	3
(United States) S Greer	5	4
2	**(Australia) C Doerner**	**7**	**6**

Third round
10	**(South Africa) B Cuypers**	5	**7**	**6**
Q	(United Kingdom) J Fayter	**7**	5	1
**(United States) L duPont**	**6**	3	**6**
2	(Australia) C Doerner	4	**6**	2

Quarterfinals
10	**(South Africa) B Cuypers**	**6**	**7**
(United States) L duPont	2	6
