= 1976 U.S. Clay Court Championships – Women's doubles =

Women's doubles
- 1976 U.S. Clay Court Championships

Final
- Champions: (South Africa) Linky Boshoff (South Africa) Ilana Kloss
- Runners-up: (United States) Laura duPont (Australia) Wendy Turnbull
- Score: 6–2, 6–3

Events
Singles	men	women
Doubles	men	women
← 1975 ·	U.S. Clay Court Championships	· 1977 →

Third-seeded team Linky Boshoff and Ilana Kloss won the title after defeating Laura duPont and Wendy Turnbull in the final.

== Seeds ==
A champion seed is indicated in bold text while text in italics indicates the round in which that seed was eliminated.

1. (Australia) Cynthia Doerner / (Australia) Lesley Hunt (semifinals)
2. (United Kingdom) Glynis Coles / (Romania) Florența Mihai (semifinals)
3. (South Africa) **Linky Boshoff / (South Africa) Ilana Kloss (champions)**
4. (United States) Laura duPont / (Australia) Wendy Turnbull (final)

== Draw ==
=== Key ===
- Q = Qualifier
- WC = Wild card
- LL = Lucky loser
- Alt = Alternate
- SE = Special exempt
- PR = Protected ranking
- ITF = ITF entry
- JE = Junior exempt
- w/o = Walkover
- r = Retired
- d = Defaulted
- SR = Special ranking

=== Finals ===
Semifinals
1	(Australia) Cynthia Doerner (Australia) Lesley Hunt	4	**7**	2
4	**(United States) Laura duPont** **(Australia) Wendy Turnbull**	**6**	6	**6**
3	**(South Africa) Linky Boshoff** **(South Africa) Ilana Kloss**	2	**6**	**6**
2	(United Kingdom) Glynis Coles (Romania) Florența Mihai	**6**	2	1

Final
4	(United States) Laura duPont (Australia) Wendy Turnbull	2	3
3	**(South Africa) Linky Boshoff** **(South Africa) Ilana Kloss**	**6**	**6**

=== Top half ===
First round
4	**(United States) L duPont** **(Australia) W Turnbull**	**6**	4	**6**
(France) R Darmon (France) G Chanfreau	3	**6**	2
**(Japan) N Sato** **(United States) A Spex**	3	**6**	**7**
(United States) Vickie Kerr (Australia) P Whytcross	**6**	4	5
**(United States) K Harter** **(West Germany) H Masthoff**	**6**	**6**
(France) F Guédy (South Africa) M Kruger	2	3
**(United States) B Nagelsen** **(United States) J Newberry**	n/a
(United States) K Kuykendall (United States) V Ziegenfuss

Second round
1	**(Australia) C Doerner** **(Australia) L Hunt**	**6**	**6**
(United States) C Reynolds (United States) N Yeargin	3	2
(United States) E Dignam (United States) L Tenney	2	2
**(United Kingdom) J Fayter** **(United States) J Metcalf**	**6**	**6**
4	**(United States) L duPont** **(Australia) W Turnbull**	**6**	**6**
(Japan) N Sato (United States) A Spex	3	1
**(United States) K Harter** **(West Germany) H Masthoff**	**6**	**6**
(United States) B Nagelsen (United States) J Newberry	1	2

Quarterfinals
1	**(Australia) C Doerner** **(Australia) L Hunt**	**6**	**6**
(United Kingdom) J Fayter (United States) J Metcalf	2	1
4	**(United States) L duPont** **(Australia) W Turnbull**	**7**	**7**
(United States) K Harter (West Germany) H Masthoff	5	6

Semifinals
1	(Australia) C Doerner (Australia) L Hunt	4	**7**	2
4	**(United States) L duPont** **(Australia) W Turnbull**	**6**	6	**6**

=== Bottom half ===
First round
(Belgium) M Gurdal (Belgium) M Van Haver	**6**	2	5
**(South Africa) B Cuypers** **(Romania) V Ruzici**	4	**6**	**7**
(United States) J Evert (United States) S Mehmedbasich	3	1
**(Uruguay) F Bonicelli** **(United States) K May**	**6**	**6**
(United States) M Louie (United States) L Thomas	**7**	3	5
**(United States) B Bruning** **(United States) S Walsh**	6	**6**	**7**
(West Germany) H Eisterlehner (West Germany) I Riedel	3	4
3	**(South Africa) L Boshoff** **(South Africa) I Kloss**	**6**	**6**

Second round
**(South Africa) B Cuypers** **(Romania) V Ruzici**	**6**	3	**6**
(Uruguay) F Bonicelli (United States) K May	3	**6**	0
(United States) B Bruning (United States) S Walsh	4	**6**	3
3	**(South Africa) L Boshoff** **(South Africa) I Kloss**	**6**	3	**6**
**(United States) S Greer** **(United States) P Smith**	**6**	**6**
(United States) G Galt (United States) M O'Keefe	3	1
(United States) B Hallquist (United States) B Jordan	0	**7**	5
2	**(United Kingdom) G Coles** **(Romania) F Mihai**	**6**	6	**7**

Quarterfinals
(South Africa) B Cuypers (Romania) V Ruzici	2	3
3	**(South Africa) L Boshoff** **(South Africa) I Kloss**	**6**	**6**
(United States) S Greer (United States) P Smith	3	**7**	6
2	**(United Kingdom) G Coles** **(Romania) F Mihai**	**6**	5	**7**

Semifinals
3	**(South Africa) L Boshoff** **(South Africa) I Kloss**	2	**6**	**6**
2	(United Kingdom) G Coles (Romania) F Mihai	**6**	2	1
