= 1976 US Open – Mixed doubles =

Tennis tournament

Mixed doubles
- 1976 US Open

Final
- Champions: (Australia) Phil Dent (United States) Billie Jean King
- Runners-up: (South Africa) Frew McMillan (Netherlands) Betty Stöve
- Score: 3–6, 6–2, 7–5

Details
- Draw: 32
- Seeds: 4

Events
Singles	men	women		boys	girls
Doubles	men	women	mixed	boys	girls
WC Singles	men	women	quad
WC Doubles	men	women	quad
Legends	men	women	mixed
← 1975 ·	US Open	· 1977 →

Dick Stockton and Rosemary Casals were the defending champions but lost in the semifinals to Phil Dent and Billie Jean King.

Phil Dent and Billie Jean King recovered from 2 match points at 4-5, 15-40 in the final set and won 3-6, 6-2, 7-5 in the final against Frew McMillan and Betty Stöve. The winning team split $6,500.

== Seeds ==
1. (United States) Dick Stockton / (United States) Rosie Casals (semifinals)
2. (South Africa) Frew McMillan / (Netherlands) Betty Stöve (final)
3. (Australia) Phil Dent / (United States) Billie Jean King (champions)
4. (United States) Marty Riessen / (France) Françoise Dürr (quarterfinals)

== Draw ==
=== Key ===
- Q = Qualifier
- WC = Wild card
- LL = Lucky loser
- Alt = Alternate
- SE = Special exempt
- PR = Protected ranking
- ITF = ITF entry
- JE = Junior exempt
- w/o = Walkover
- r = Retired
- d = Defaulted
- SR = Special ranking

=== Finals ===
Semifinals
2	(South Africa) Frew McMillan (Netherlands) Betty Stöve	6	6
(Australia) Geoff Masters (Australia) Lesley Hunt	3	4
3	(Australia) Phil Dent (United States) Billie Jean King	6	7
1	(United States) Dick Stockton (United States) Rosie Casals	2	6

Final
2	(South Africa) Frew McMillan (Netherlands) Betty Stöve	6	2	5
3	(Australia) Phil Dent (United States) Billie Jean King	3	6	7

=== Top half ===
First round
2	(South Africa) F McMillan (Netherlands) B Stöve	6	6
(United States) E Friedler (United States) J Russell	4	1
(South Africa) P Cramer (United States) B Nagelsen	6	6
(South Africa) D Schneider (United States) L Tenney	1	4
(United States) V Winitsky (United States) R Fox	3	7	6
(United States) H Pfister (United States) S Tolleson	6	6	2
(Australia) J Marks (United States) P Teeguarden	6	4	6
(Australia) R Case (United States) BA Stuart	2	6	2
4	(United States) M Riessen (France) F Dürr	7	4	6
(United States) B Walts (United States) K Shaw	6	6	3
(India) V Amritraj (United States) K May	7	6
(United Kingdom) J Lloyd (Czechoslovakia) R Tomanová	6	2
(Soviet Union) T Kakulia (Soviet Union) N Chmyreva	6	2
(Australia) G Masters (Australia) L Hunt	7	6
(Rhodesia) C Dowdeswell (South Africa) L Boshoff	6	6
(South Africa) B Mitton (United States) R Tenney	2	2

Second round
2	(South Africa) F McMillan (Netherlands) B Stöve	7	3	6
(South Africa) P Cramer (United States) B Nagelsen	6	6	2
(United States) V Winitsky (United States) R Fox	4	4
(Australia) J Marks (United States) P Teeguarden	6	6
4	(United States) M Riessen (France) F Dürr	6	6
(India) V Amritraj (United States) K May	3	4
(Australia) G Masters (Australia) L Hunt	6	4	6
(Rhodesia) C Dowdeswell (South Africa) L Boshoff	2	6	4

Quarterfinals
2	(South Africa) F McMillan (Netherlands) B Stöve	6	4	6
(Australia) J Marks (United States) P Teeguarden	4	6	3
4	(United States) M Riessen (France) F Dürr	3	6	5
(Australia) G Masters (Australia) L Hunt	6	1	7

Semifinals
2	(South Africa) F McMillan (Netherlands) B Stöve	6	6
(Australia) G Masters (Australia) L Hunt	3	4

=== Bottom half ===
First round
(Australia) A Stone (United States) M Guerrant	6	3	6
(Australia) P Kronk (Sweden) I Bentzer	4	6	4
(United States) M Machette (United States) S Walsh	3	6	3
(Australia) K Warwick (South Africa) I Kloss	6	3	6
(United States) B Heinbecker (United States) C Aucamp	4	3
(United States) S Siegel (United States) J Metcalf	6	6
(United States) M Estep (United States) J Anthony	2	4
3	(Australia) P Dent (United States) BJ King	6	6
(Australia) M Edmondson (Czechoslovakia) R Maršíková	7	3	1
(Australia) S Ball (United States) A Kiyomura	5	6	6
(United States) F McNair (United States) W Overton	3	4
(Soviet Union) A Metreveli (Soviet Union) O Morozova	6	6
(United Kingdom) J Feaver (United Kingdom) L Beaven	3	7	7
(United States) V Gerulaitis (United States) R Gerulaitis	6	6	6
(United States) S Turner (Australia) C Doerner	1	3
1	(United States) D Stockton (United States) R Casals	6	6

Second round
(Australia) A Stone (United States) M Guerrant	7	6
(Australia) K Warwick (South Africa) I Kloss	6	2
(United States) S Siegel (United States) J Metcalf	3	4
3	(Australia) P Dent (United States) BJ King	6	6
(Australia) S Ball (United States) A Kiyomura	4	6	6
(Soviet Union) A Metreveli (Soviet Union) O Morozova	6	3	4
(United Kingdom) J Feaver (United Kingdom) L Beaven	1	1
1	(United States) D Stockton (United States) R Casals	6	6

Quarterfinals
(Australia) A Stone (United States) M Guerrant	4	6	3
3	(Australia) P Dent (United States) BJ King	6	4	6
(Australia) S Ball (United States) A Kiyomura	0	4
1	(United States) D Stockton (United States) R Casals	6	6

Semifinals
3	(Australia) P Dent (United States) BJ King	6	7
1	(United States) D Stockton (United States) R Casals	2	6
