= 1976 US Open – Men's doubles =

Men's doubles
- 1976 US Open

Final
- Champion: (Netherlands) Tom Okker (United States) Marty Riessen
- Runner-up: (Australia) Paul Kronk (Australia) Cliff Letcher
- Score: 6–4, 6–4

Details
- Draw: 64
- Seeds: 16

Events
Singles	men	women		boys	girls
Doubles	men	women	mixed	boys	girls
WC Singles	men	women	quad
WC Doubles	men	women	quad
Legends	men	women	mixed
← 1975 ·	US Open	· 1977 →

Jimmy Connors and Ilie Năstase were the defending champions but only Ilie Năstase competed that year with Vitas Gerulaitis. Vitas Gerulaitis and Ilie Năstase lost in the second round to Paul Kronk and Cliff Letcher.

Tom Okker and Marty Riessen won in the final 6–4, 6–4 against Paul Kronk and Cliff Letcher.

== Seeds ==
1. (United States) Brian Gottfried / (Mexico) Raúl Ramírez (second round)
2. (United States) Fred McNair / (United States) Sherwood Stewart (quarterfinals)
3. (South Africa) Bob Hewitt / (South Africa) Frew McMillan (quarterfinals)
4. (Netherlands) Tom Okker / (United States) Marty Riessen (champions)
5. (United States) Bob Lutz / (United States) Stan Smith (third round)
6. (United States) Chico Hagey / (United States) Nick Saviano (third round)
7. (United States) Vitas Gerulaitis / (Romania) Ilie Năstase (second round)
8. (United States) Arthur Ashe / (United States) Charlie Pasarell (first round)
9. (India) Anand Amritraj / (India) Vijay Amritraj (quarterfinals)
10. (Australia) Ray Ruffels / (Australia) Allan Stone (semifinals)
11. (Sweden) Björn Borg / (Poland) Wojtek Fibak (second round)
12. (Argentina) Ricardo Cano / (West Germany) Hans-Jürgen Pohmann (second round)
13. n.a.
14. (Czechoslovakia) Jiří Hřebec / (Czechoslovakia) Jan Kodeš (first round)
15. (United States) Dick Stockton / (United States) Roscoe Tanner (third round)
16. (Australia) John Alexander / (Australia) Phil Dent (second round)

== Draw ==
=== Key ===
- Q = Qualifier
- WC = Wild card
- LL = Lucky loser
- Alt = Alternate
- ITF = ITF entry
- PR = Protected ranking
- SR = Special ranking
- SE = Special exempt
- JE = Junior exempt
- JR = Junior Accelerator Programme entrant
- CO = College Accelerator Programme entrant
- NG = Next Gen Accelerator Program entrant
- w/o = Walkover
- r = Retired
- d = Defaulted

=== Finals ===
Quarterfinals
(South Africa) Byron Bertram (South Africa) Bernard Mitton	2	4
10	(Australia) Ray Ruffels (Australia) Allan Stone	6	6
3	(South Africa) Bob Hewitt (South Africa) Frew McMillan	5	6	1
(Australia) Paul Kronk (Australia) Cliff Letcher	7	4	6
9	(India) Anand Amritraj (India) Vijay Amritraj	6	4	3
4	(Netherlands) Tom Okker (United States) Marty Riessen	2	6	6
(Rhodesia) Colin Dowdeswell (Australia) Chris Kachel	2	7	7
2	(United States) Fred McNair (United States) Sherwood Stewart	6	5	6

Semifinals
10	(Australia) Ray Ruffels (Australia) Allan Stone	4	3
(Australia) Paul Kronk (Australia) Cliff Letcher	6	6
4	(Netherlands) Tom Okker (United States) Marty Riessen	6	7
(Rhodesia) Colin Dowdeswell (Australia) Chris Kachel	3	6

Final
(Australia) Paul Kronk (Australia) Cliff Letcher	4	4
4	(Netherlands) Tom Okker (United States) Marty Riessen	6	6

=== Top half ===
==== Section 1 ====
First round
1	(United States) B Gottfried (Mexico) R Ramírez	6	6	6
(Colombia) Á Betancur (Colombia) J Velasco	7	1	1
(South Africa) B Bertram (South Africa) B Mitton	6	6
(Sweden) R Norberg (Sweden) T Svensson	1	4
16	(Australia) J Alexander (Australia) P Dent	6	7	6
(United States) L Gottfried (United States) J McEnroe	7	6	3
(United States) W Brown (United States) B Teacher	3	4
(United States) P Fleming (United States) F Taygan	6	6
5	(United States) B Lutz (United States) S Smith	6	6
(United States) V Amaya (United States) P DuPré	4	3
(South Africa) D Joubert (South Africa) D Schneider	2	2
(Australia) J Bartlett (Australia) N Fraser	6	6
10	(Australia) R Ruffels (Australia) A Stone	6	6
(Argentina) E Álvarez (Chile) B Prajoux	4	4
(United States) S Krulevitz (United States) T Waltke	6	3	3
(United States) D Bohrnstedt (United States) M Mitchell	4	6	6

Second round
1	(United States) B Gottfried (Mexico) R Ramírez	6	3	6
(South Africa) B Bertram (South Africa) B Mitton	4	6	7
16	(Australia) J Alexander (Australia) P Dent	7	4	3
(United States) P Fleming (United States) F Taygan	6	6	6
5	(United States) B Lutz (United States) S Smith	6	6
(Australia) J Bartlett (Australia) N Fraser	0	1
10	(Australia) R Ruffels (Australia) A Stone	6	6
(United States) D Bohrnstedt (United States) M Mitchell	4	2

Third round
(South Africa) B Bertram (South Africa) B Mitton	6	6
(United States) P Fleming (United States) F Taygan	3	1
5	(United States) B Lutz (United States) S Smith	3	6	4
10	(Australia) R Ruffels (Australia) A Stone	6	3	6

Quarterfinals
(South Africa) B Bertram (South Africa) B Mitton	2	4
10	(Australia) R Ruffels (Australia) A Stone	6	6

==== Section 2 ====
First round
3	(South Africa) B Hewitt (South Africa) F McMillan	6	6
(United States) Tim Gullikson (United States) Tom Gullikson	4	2
(United States) R Reid (Netherlands) R Thung	7	6
(Australia) A Gardiner (Australia) J James	6	1
15	(United States) D Stockton (United States) R Tanner	6	7
(Sweden) O Bengtson (United States) J McManus	1	6
(United States) H Pfister (United States) B Scanlon	6	6
(Australia) D Crealy (United States) K McMillan	3	3
7	(United States) V Gerulaitis (Romania) I Năstase	6	6
(Switzerland) H Günthardt (United States) H Hoyt	4	4
(Australia) P Kronk (Australia) C Letcher	6	7
(Iran) M Bahrami (United States) M Fishbach	2	5
14	(Czechoslovakia) J Hřebec (Czechoslovakia) J Kodeš	4	1^{r}
(South Africa) P Cramer (United States) M Estep	6	4
(United States) W Cashman (United States) W Drake	2	6	2
(United States) T Moor (United States) B Seewagen	6	3	6

Second round
3	(South Africa) B Hewitt (South Africa) F McMillan	5	6	6
(United States) R Reid (Netherlands) R Thung	7	4	2
15	(United States) D Stockton (United States) R Tanner	7	4	6
(United States) H Pfister (United States) B Scanlon	6	6	4
7	(United States) V Gerulaitis (Romania) I Năstase	1	5
(Australia) P Kronk (Australia) C Letcher	6	7
(South Africa) P Cramer (United States) M Estep	6	6
(United States) T Moor (United States) B Seewagen	4	2

Third round
3	(South Africa) B Hewitt (South Africa) F McMillan	6	6
15	(United States) D Stockton (United States) R Tanner	2	3
(Australia) P Kronk (Australia) C Letcher	6	6	6
(South Africa) P Cramer (United States) M Estep	4	7	2

Quarterfinals
3	(South Africa) B Hewitt (South Africa) F McMillan	5	6	1
(Australia) P Kronk (Australia) C Letcher	7	4	6

=== Bottom half ===
==== Section 3 ====
First round
(United States) S Siegel (United States) S Turner	1	2
(United States) J Delaney (United States) M Machette	6	6
(Egypt) I El Shafei (New Zealand) B Fairlie	5	3
9	(India) A Amritraj (India) V Amritraj	7	6
(Spain) M Santana (United States) E Scott	3	4
(United States) C Hagey (United States) N Saviano	6	6
(Australia) S Ball (Australia) K Warwick	6	6	1
6	(Australia) R Case (Australia) G Masters	7	3	6
(Socialist Federal Republic of Yugoslavia) N Špear (Hungary) B Taróczy	3	3
(United States) C Graebner (Australia) F Stolle	6	6
(United States) B Manson (United States) B Walts	4	2
11	(Sweden) B Borg (Poland) W Fibak	6	6
(Soviet Union) T Kakulia (Soviet Union) A Metreveli	6	2	6
(Chile) Á Fillol (Chile) J Fillol	3	6	4
(Venezuela) J Andrew (Bolivia) R Benavides	2	0
4	(Netherlands) T Okker (United States) M Riessen	6	6

Second round
(United States) J Delaney (United States) M Machette	3	3
9	(India) A Amritraj (India) V Amritraj	6	6
(United States) C Hagey (United States) N Saviano	6	5
6	(Australia) R Case (Australia) G Masters	7	7
(United States) C Graebner (Australia) F Stolle	6	6
11	(Sweden) B Borg (Poland) W Fibak	3	4
(Soviet Union) T Kakulia (Soviet Union) A Metreveli	4	3
4	(Netherlands) T Okker (United States) M Riessen	6	6

Third round
9	(India) A Amritraj (India) V Amritraj	7	5	7
6	(Australia) R Case (Australia) G Masters	5	7	5
(United States) C Graebner (Australia) F Stolle	4	7	3
4	(Netherlands) T Okker (United States) M Riessen	6	6	6

Quarterfinals
9	(India) A Amritraj (India) V Amritraj	6	4	3
4	(Netherlands) T Okker (United States) M Riessen	2	6	6

==== Section 4 ====
First round
(Czechoslovakia) F Pála (Australia) B Phillips-Moore	1	7	0
(Rhodesia) C Dowdeswell (Australia) C Kachel	6	5	6
(Australia) C Dibley (India) S Menon	3	6	4
12	(Argentina) R Cano (West Germany) H-J Pohmann	6	4	6
(Mexico) T Palafox (United States) P Rennert	2	3
(United States) P Fishbach (South Africa) R Moore	6	6
(Romania) I Țiriac (Argentina) G Vilas	6	6
8	(United States) A Ashe (United States) C Pasarell	2	4
(United States) E Friedler (United States) J Karzen	4	6	3
(United States) H Fitzgibbon (United States) H Richardson	6	3	6
(Australia) M Edmondson (Australia) J Marks	6	6
(United States) T Martinez (United States) T Noonan	1	3
(United Kingdom) J Feaver (United Kingdom) J Lloyd	6	6	6
(United States) M Cahill (United States) J Whitlinger	7	4	3
(Argentina) J Ganzábal (France) J-L Haillet	6	3	2
2	(United States) F McNair (United States) S Stewart	3	6	6

Second round
(Rhodesia) C Dowdeswell (Australia) C Kachel	w/o
12	(Argentina) R Cano (West Germany) H-J Pohmann
(United States) P Fishbach (South Africa) R Moore	3	6	4
(Romania) I Țiriac (Argentina) G Vilas	6	4	6
(United States) H Fitzgibbon (United States) H Richardson	0^{r}
(Australia) M Edmondson (Australia) J Marks	4
(United Kingdom) J Feaver (United Kingdom) J Lloyd	2	4
2	(United States) F McNair (United States) S Stewart	6	6

Third round
(Rhodesia) C Dowdeswell (Australia) C Kachel	6	6
(Romania) I Țiriac (Argentina) G Vilas	2	4
(Australia) M Edmondson (Australia) J Marks	7	6	6
2	(United States) F McNair (United States) S Stewart	5	7	7

Quarterfinals
(Rhodesia) C Dowdeswell (Australia) C Kachel	2	7	7
2	(United States) F McNair (United States) S Stewart	6	5	6
