= 1975 Wimbledon Championships – Women's singles qualifying =

Women's singles qualifying
- 1975 Wimbledon Championships

Events
Singles	men	women		boys	girls
Doubles	men	women	mixed	boys	girls
WC Singles	men	women	quad
WC Doubles	men	women	quad
Legends	men	women	seniors

Qualification
Singles	men	women
Doubles	men	women	mixed
- Wimbledon Championships

Players who neither had high enough rankings nor received wild cards to enter the main draw of the annual Wimbledon Tennis Championships participated in a qualifying tournament held one week before the event.

== Qualifiers ==
1. (Germany) Heidi Eisterlehner
2. (United States) Kathy May
3. (Australia) Jenny Dimond
4. (Japan) Naoko Sato
5. (United States) Roberta Stark
6. (United States) Patty Ann Reese
7. (United States) Linda Rupert
8. (United States) Laurie Tenney

== Lucky losers ==
1. (United States) Janet Haas

== Qualifying draw ==
Key

- Q = Qualifier
- WC = Wild card
- LL = Lucky loser
- Alt = Alternate
- ITF = ITF entry
- PR = Protected ranking
- SR = Special ranking
- SE = Special exempt
- JE = Junior exempt
- JR = Junior Accelerator Programme entrant
- CO = College Accelerator Programme entrant
- NG = Next Gen Accelerator Program entrant
- w/o = Walkover
- r = Retired
- d = Defaulted

=== First qualifier ===
First round
1	(Germany) Heidi Eisterlehner	6	6
8	(Brazil) Wanda Ferraz	1	1
4	(United States) Lindsay Morse	6	6
5	(United Kingdom) Frances Candy	0	2
2	(United Kingdom) Corinne Molesworth	5	6	6
7	(Australia) K. Walker	7	3	4
3	(South Africa) Martie De Villiers	6	8
6	(United States) Erin Dignam	1	6

Second round
(Germany) Heidi Eisterlehner	3	6	6
(United States) Lindsay Morse	6	4	1
(United Kingdom) Corinne Molesworth	6	6	8
(South Africa) Martie De Villiers	1	8	6

Qualifying competition
(Germany) Heidi Eisterlehner	8	6	8
(United Kingdom) Corinne Molesworth	9	2	6

=== Second qualifier ===
First round
1	(United States) Kathy May	6	6
8	(Socialist Federal Republic of Yugoslavia) Dora Alavantić	2	0
4	(Belgium) Monique Van Haver	7	7
5	(Japan) Kayoko Fukuoka	5	5
3	(Australia) Jenny Walker	6	6
6	(Argentina) Patricia Bianchi	1	4

Second round
(United States) Kathy May	6	7
(Belgium) Monique Van Haver	2	5
(Australia) Kym Ruddell	6	6
(Australia) Jenny Walker	4	2

Qualifying competition
(United States) Kathy May	6	6
(Australia) Kym Ruddell	3	2

=== Third qualifier ===
First round
1	(Australia) Jenny Dimond	6	6
8	(United Kingdom) Jill Cottrell	4	1
4	(South Africa) Helen Liebenberg	6	3	7
5	(Argentina) Ines Roget	2	6	5
2	(United States) Bunny Bruning	6	6
7	(Japan) Toshiko Sade	2	0
3	(Indonesia) Yolanda Soemarno	6	6
6	(United States) S.C. Eastman	3	3

Second round
(Australia) Jenny Dimond	6	7
(South Africa) Helen Liebenberg	3	5
(United States) Bunny Bruning	6	6
(Indonesia) Yolanda Soemarno	2	3

Qualifying competition
(Australia) Jenny Dimond	6	6
(United States) Bunny Bruning	4	4

=== Fourth qualifier ===
First round
1	(Japan) Naoko Sato	3	6	6
8	(New Zealand) Pauline Elliott	6	1	3
4	(United States) Sally Moore	6	6
5	(Indonesia) Lita Liem Sugiarto	2	2
2	(Australia) Jan Wilton	6	6
7	(United Kingdom) Julia Lloyd	1	0
3	(Australia) Kaye Hallam	6	6
6	(United States) Shari Barman	2	2

Second round
(Japan) Naoko Sato	9	6
(United States) Sally Moore	7	3
(Australia) Jan Wilton	2	7	6
(Australia) Kaye Hallam	6	5	4

Qualifying competition
(Japan) Naoko Sato	6	6
(Australia) Jan Wilton	4	1

=== Fifth qualifier ===
First round
1	(United States) Roberta Stark	6	6
8	(Switzerland) Susi Eichenberger	1	2
4	(Argentina) Elvira Weisenberger	6	6
5	(New Zealand) S. Meachen	3	4
2	(United Kingdom) Linda Geeves	6	2	6
7	(Australia) C.M. Cerato	2	6	2
3	(South Africa) Renee Du Toit	6	6
6	(Australia) C.E. Douglas	4	3

Second round
(United States) Roberta Stark	6	6
(Argentina) Elvira Weisenberger	4	4
(United Kingdom) Linda Geeves	6	6
(South Africa) Renee Du Toit	3	2

Qualifying competition
(United States) Roberta Stark	6	6
(United Kingdom) Linda Geeves	4	2

=== Sixth qualifier ===
First round
1	(United States) Patty Ann Reese	6	6
8	(Austria) Veronika Buche	2	4
4	(Australia) Julie Hanrahan	6	6
5	(United Kingdom) Diane Riste	3	1
2	(Australia) Pam Whytcross	6	6
7	(Argentina) Beatriz Araujo	3	3
3	(United Kingdom) Penny Moor	4	6	6
6	(South Africa) L. Raymond	6	3	2

Second round
(United States) Patty Ann Reese	8	6
(Australia) Julie Hanrahan	6	4
(Australia) Pam Whytcross	7	6
(United Kingdom) Penny Moor	5	4

Qualifying competition
(United States) Patty Ann Reese	4	6	6
(Australia) Pam Whytcross	6	3	1

=== Seventh qualifier ===
First round
1	(United States) Linda Rupert	6	6
8	(Australia) Diane Evers	2	1
2	(Sweden) Christina Sandberg	6	6
7	(Brazil) Patricia Medrado	3	0
3	(Austria) Sonia Pachta	6	6
6	(United States) Maricaye Christenson	4	3

Second round
(United States) Linda Rupert	2	7	6
(United Kingdom) Belinda Thompson	6	5	4
(Sweden) Christina Sandberg	6	6
(Austria) Sonia Pachta	1	3

Qualifying competition
(United States) Linda Rupert	6	6
(Sweden) Christina Sandberg	1	0

=== Eighth qualifier ===
First round
1	(United States) Laurie Tenney	6	6
8	(Romania) Florenza Mihai	3	2
4	(Argentina) Susana Maria Villaverde	6	6
5	(United Kingdom) Judy Congdon	2	3
2	(United States) Janet Haas	3	7	6
7	(Australia) Nerida Gregory	6	5	4
3	(United Kingdom) J.D. Griffiths	6	3	6
6	(Brazil) Cicero Britto	4	6	2

Second round
(United States) Laurie Tenney	6	6
(Argentina) Susana Maria Villaverde	3	4
(United States) Janet Haas	6	6
(United Kingdom) J.D. Griffiths	1	2

Qualifying competition
(United States) Laurie Tenney	6	6
(United States) Janet Haas	1	4
