= Mountain View Open (tennis) =

Defunct tennis tournament
- Tour: ILTF World Circuit
- Founded: 1965; 61 years ago
- Abolished: 2019; 7 years ago
- Location: San Jose (1965); Mountain View (1966–2020)
- Venue: San Jose State College Courts (1965); Rengstorff Park Tennis Courts (1966–1971); Cuesta Tennis Center (1972–1994)
- Surface: Hard / outdoor

The Mountain View Open was a men's and women's hard court international tennis tournament founded in 1965. Also known as the Mountain View Tennis Tournament it was played at the Cuesta Tennis Center, Cuesta Park, Mountain View, California, United States until 2019.

== History ==
Founded in 1964 as the Mountain View Tennis Tournament the event was organized by the Mountain View Tennis in association with the Mountain View Parks and Recreation Department, and was played at the Cuesta Tennis Center, Cuesta Park, Mountain View, California, United States. The event was sanctioned by both the United States Tennis Association and the Northern California Tennis Association. The tournament was played as part of the ILTF World Circuit until 1969 for men and 1972 for women when it became part of the ILTF Independent Circuit until 1977 when it was downgraded to local USTA event. In 1992 the tournament lost its sponsorship arrangement with the City of Mountview, and its Parks and Recreation Department and as such was no longer sanctioned by the USTA. It did however continued to be held independently until 1994 when it was discontinued. In 1999 the event was revived as a local USTA tournament until 2019 but due the COVID-19 pandemic in 2020 it was cancelled and has not been revived as of 2024.

== Finals ==
=== Men's singles ===
(Incomplete roll)

| Year | Winners | Runners-up | Score |
|---|---|---|---|
| 1965 | (United States) Don Gale | (United States) Butch Krikorian | 6–1, 6–4 . |
| 1966 | (United States) Garth O'Maley | (United States) Gene Ward | 7–5, 6–4. |
| 1967 | (United States) Whitney Reed | (United States) Tom Brown | 6–4, 6–4. |
| 1968 | (United States) Robert Potthast | (United States) Whitney Reed | 6–1, 5–7, 9–7. |
↓ Open era ↓
| 1969 | (Socialist Federal Republic of Yugoslavia) Zdravko Mincek | (United States) Rich Anderson | 8–6, 6–2. |
| 1970 | (United States) Tom Brown | (United States) Robert Potthast | 7–6, 7–6. |
| 1971 | (United States) Roscoe Tanner | (United States) Chuck Darley | 6–3, 6–2. |
| 1972 | (United States) Sandy Mayer | (United States) Roscoe Tanner | 6–1, 6–7, 6–3. |
| 1973 | (United States) Nick Saviano | (United States) Dick R. Bohrnstedt | 6-0, 3–6, 6–3. |
| 1974 | (United States) Bob Siska | (United States) Nick Saviano | 0–6, 6–2, 6–4. |
| 1975 | (Brazil) João Soares | (United States) Scott Carnahan | 4–6, 7–6, 6–3 |
| 1976 | (United States) Craig Johnson | (United States) Richard Andrews | 5–7, 6–1, 6–2 |

=== Women's singles ===
(Incomplete roll)

| Year | Winners | Runners-up | Score |
|---|---|---|---|
| 1969 | (United States) Tina Lyman | (United States) Marlene Muench | 6–1, 6–2 |
| 1970 | (United States) Ann Kiyomura | (United States) Kate Latham | 7–5, 4–6, 6–0 |
| 1971 | (United States) Ann Kiyomura (2) | (United States) Barbara Downs | 6–3, 5–7, 6–3 |
| 1972 | (United States) Kate Latham | (United States) Marcy O'Keefe | 1–6, 6–1, 6–1 |
| 1973 | (United States) Kate Latham (2) | (United States) Marcy O'Keefe | 6–4, 6–3 |
| 1974 | (United States) Sue Mehmedbasich | (United States) Peanut Louie | 6–4, 6–3 |
| 1975 | (United States) Sue Mehmedbasich (2) | (United States) Peanut Louie | 6–3, 7–6 |
| 1976 | (United States) Peanut Louie | (United States) Denise Carter-Triolo | 7–6, 6–1 |

== Sources ==
- Mountain View Open
