= 1975 French Open – Women's singles qualifying =

Women's singles qualifying
- 1975 French Open

Events
Singles	men	women		boys	girls
Doubles	men	women	mixed	boys	girls
WC Singles	men	women	quad
WC Doubles	men	women	quad
Legends	−45	45+	women
← 1974 ·	French Open	· 1977 →

Players who neither had high enough rankings nor received wild cards to enter the main draw of the annual French Open Tennis Championships participated in a qualifying tournament held in the week before the event.

== Qualifiers ==
1. (Romania) Florența Mihai
2. (United States) Linda Rupert
3. (Australia) Wendy Gilchrist
4. (West Germany) Iris Riedel-Kühn
5. (Argentina) Elvira Weisenberger
6. (Sweden) Christina Sandberg
7. (Italy) Antonella Rosa
8. (Italy) Daniela Porzio

== Lucky losers ==
1. (Chile) Michelle Rodríguez
2. (United States) Robin Tenney

== Qualifying draw ==
=== Key ===
- Q = Qualifier
- WC = Wild card
- LL = Lucky loser
- Alt = Alternate
- ITF = ITF entry
- PR = Protected ranking
- SR = Special ranking
- SE = Special exempt
- JE = Junior exempt
- JR = Junior Accelerator Programme entrant
- CO = College Accelerator Programme entrant
- NG = Next Gen Accelerator Program entrant
- w/o = Walkover
- r = Retired
- d = Defaulted

=== First qualifier ===
First round
1	(United States) Robin Tenney
8	(France) Maylis Burel	w/o
4	(Australia) Jenny Dimond	6	6
5	(Argentina) Ines Roget	3	4
2	(France) Danièle Bouteleux	2	6	6
7	(Brazil) Cristina Ribeiro-Britto	6	4	2
3	(Romania) Florența Mihai	6	6
6	(Japan) Kayoko Fukuoka	0	4

Second round
(United States) Robin Tenney	6	6
(Australia) Jenny Dimond	1	1
(France) Danièle Bouteleux	6	3	1
(Romania) Florența Mihai	3	6	6

Qualifying competition
(United States) Robin Tenney	3	6
(Romania) Florența Mihai	6	7

=== Second qualifier ===
First round
1	(United States) Sally Moore
8	(France) Christine Gimmig	w/o
4	(United States) Linda Rupert	6	6
5	(Austria) Veronika Buche	2	3
2	(France) Martine Bureau	6	6
7	(Japan) Toshiko Sade	2	3
3	(Sweden) Mimmi Wikstedt	7	6
6	(United States) Roberta Stark	5	4

Second round
(United States) Sally Moore	2	1
(United States) Linda Rupert	6	6
(France) Martine Bureau	6	2
(Sweden) Mimmi Wikstedt	7	6

Qualifying competition
(United States) Linda Rupert	6	5	6
(Sweden) Mimmi Wikstedt	2	7	2

=== Third qualifier ===
First round
1	(Australia) Wendy Gilchrist
8	(France) Anne-Marie Cassaigne	w/o
4	(Indonesia) Yolanda Soemarno	6	7
5	(Australia) Diane Eastburn	3	6
2	(France) Anne-Marie Rouchon	6	6
7	(Italy) Antonella Canapi	2	2
3	(Switzerland) Susana Maria Villaverde	6	2	6
6	(United States) Maricaye Christenson	4	6	1

Second round
(Australia) Wendy Gilchrist	6	6
(Indonesia) Yolanda Soemarno	1	1
(France) Anne-Marie Rouchon	6	3	2
(Switzerland) Susana Maria Villaverde	4	6	6

Qualifying competition
(Australia) Wendy Gilchrist	7	6
(Switzerland) Susana Maria Villaverde	6	4

=== Fourth qualifier ===
First round
1	(West Germany) Iris Riedel-Kühn	6	6
8	(France) Patricia Rime	4	4
4	(France) Martine Cazaux	3	6	7
5	(Rhodesia) Daphne Pattison	6	4	5
2	(New Zealand) Judy Connor	6	6
7	(Brazil) Marillia Matte	2	2
3	(Australia) Cynthia Doerner	6	6
6	(Japan) Naoko Sato	2	1

Second round
(West Germany) Iris Riedel-Kühn	6	6
(France) Martine Cazaux	3	3
(New Zealand) Judy Connor	6	6
(Australia) Cynthia Doerner	1	4

Qualifying competition
(West Germany) Iris Riedel-Kühn	6	7
(New Zealand) Judy Connor	4	5

=== Fifth qualifier ===
First round
1	(France) Frédérique Thibault	6	6
8	(France) Catherine De Lorme	4	1
4	(Japan) Michiko Saji	4	6	6
5	(Austria) Sonja Pachta	6	4	4
2	(Argentina) Elvira Weisenberger
7	(France) Michele Mizen	w/o
3	(France) Élisabeth Du Fresne-Girard	7	6
6	(Australia) Pam Whytcross	5	4

Second round
(France) Frédérique Thibault	6	6
(Japan) Michiko Saji	3	3
(Argentina) Elvira Weisenberger	6	6
(France) Élisabeth Du Fresne-Girard	4	4

Qualifying competition
(France) Frédérique Thibault	5	2
(Argentina) Elvira Weisenberger	7	6

=== Sixth qualifier ===
First round
1	(Sweden) Christina Sandberg	6	6
8	(United States) N. Marman	2	1
4	(France) Huguette Barat	6	6
5	(Brazil) Soraya Guellas	0	1
2	(France) Perrine Du Puy	7	6
7	(Australia) Jan Wilton	5	2
3	(United States) Sally Greer	6	6
6	(France) Sylvie Pruvot	2	3

Second round
(Sweden) Christina Sandberg
(France) Huguette Barat	w/o
(France) Perrine Du Puy	3	2
(United States) Sally Greer	6	6

Qualifying competition
(Sweden) Christina Sandberg	7	6
(United States) Sally Greer	6	2

=== Seventh qualifier ===
First round
1	(Australia) Christine Matison	6	3	7
8	(Brazil) Patricia Medrado	4	6	5
4	(Italy) Antonella Rosa	2	6	6
5	(United States) Ruta Gerulaitis	6	4	4
2	(United States) Janet Haas	6	6
7	(Morocco) Saadia Mezdel	0	0
3	(Belgium) Monique Van Haver	6	6
6	(United States) E. Kogl	0	1

Second round
(Australia) Christine Matison	6	2
(Italy) Antonella Rosa	7	6
(United States) Janet Haas	6	4
(Belgium) Monique Van Haver	7	6

Qualifying competition
(Italy) Antonella Rosa	4	6	8
(Belgium) Monique Van Haver	6	2	6

=== Eighth qualifier ===
First round
1	(Japan) Satoyo Funaki	6	6
8	(United States) F. Dawson	1	1
4	(Chile) Michelle Rodríguez	6	6
5	(Australia) Kaye Hallam	1	1
2	(Italy) Daniela Porzio
7	(France) Marie-Christine Brochard	w/o
3	(France) Dominique Beillan	6	6
6	(Brazil) Wanda Ferraz	1	1

Second round
(Japan) Satoyo Funaki	4	4
(Chile) Michelle Rodríguez	6	6
(Italy) Daniela Porzio	7	6
(France) Dominique Beillan	6	1

Qualifying competition
(Chile) Michelle Rodríguez	3	6	1
(Italy) Daniela Porzio	6	4	6
