= Juan Díaz (tennis) =

American tennis player

- Country (sports): United States
- Height: 5 ft 8 in (173 cm)

Singles
- Career record: 1–2
- Highest ranking: No. 310 (Dec 12, 1976)

Grand Slam singles results
- US Open: 1R (1976)

Juan Díaz is an American former professional tennis player.

Díaz was raised in Cuba, where he was the nation's top ranked junior in 1968 and 1969.

Moving to Tampa, Florida in 1969, Díaz played on the varsity team for the University of Florida and was SEC champion at No. 1 singles in 1975, as well as a three-time All-SEC.

After graduating from college in 1975 he competed briefly on tour, reaching a best singles world ranking of 310. He made a main draw appearance as a qualifier at the 1976 US Open.
