= 1976 US Open – Women's singles =

Women's singles
- 1976 US Open

Final
- Champion: (United States) Chris Evert
- Runner-up: (Australia) Evonne Goolagong
- Score: 6–3, 6–0

Details
- Draw: 96
- Seeds: 16

Events
Singles	men	women		boys	girls
Doubles	men	women	mixed	boys	girls
WC Singles	men	women	quad
WC Doubles	men	women	quad
Legends	men	women	mixed
← 1975 ·	US Open	· 1977 →

Defending champion Chris Evert defeated Evonne Goolagong in a rematch of the previous year's final, 6–3, 6–0 to win the women's singles tennis title at the 1976 US Open. It was her second US Open title and her sixth major singles title overall. Evert did not lose a set during the tournament. It was Goolagong's fourth consecutive runner-up finish at the event, her best career result at the tournament; she was attempting to complete the career Grand Slam.

== Seeds ==
The seeded players are listed below. Chris Evert is the champion; others show the round in which they were eliminated.

1. (United States) Chris Evert (champion)
2. (Australia) Evonne Goolagong (finalist)
3. (United States) Martina Navratilova (first round)
4. (United Kingdom) Virginia Wade (second round)
5. (United States) Nancy Richey (second round)
6. (United States) Rosie Casals (quarterfinalist)
7. (Australia) Kerry Reid (second round)
8. (Soviet Union) Olga Morozova (third round)
9. (United Kingdom) Sue Barker (fourth round)
10. (Australia) Dianne Fromholtz (semifinalist)
11. (United States) Mona Guerrant (first round)
12. (France) Françoise Dürr (fourth round)
13. (Soviet Union) Natasha Chmyreva (quarterfinalist)
14. (United States) Carrie Meyer (first round)
15. (United States) Terry Holladay (fourth round)
16. (Netherlands) Betty Stöve (first round)

== Draw ==
=== Key ===
- Q = Qualifier
- WC = Wild card
- LL = Lucky loser
- r = Retired

=== Finals ===
Quarterfinals
1	(United States) Chris Evert	6	6
13	(Soviet Union) Natasha Chmyreva	1	2
(Socialist Federal Republic of Yugoslavia) Mima Jaušovec	6	6
(Romania) Virginia Ruzici	2	1
(United States) Zenda Liess	1	3
10	(Australia) Dianne Fromholtz	6	6
6	(United States) Rosie Casals	1	2
2	(Australia) Evonne Goolagong	6	6

Semifinals
1	(United States) Chris Evert	6	6
(Socialist Federal Republic of Yugoslavia) Mima Jaušovec	3	1
10	(Australia) Dianne Fromholtz	6	0
2	(Australia) Evonne Goolagong	7	6

Finals
1	(United States) Chris Evert	6	6
2	(Australia) Evonne Goolagong	3	0

=== Earlier rounds ===
==== Section 1 ====
First round

Second round
1	(United States) Evert	6	6
(South Africa) Stevens	1	0
(United Kingdom) Coles	3	7	7
(United States) Struthers	6	5	5
9	(United Kingdom) Barker	6	6
(United States) Walsh	1	1
(United Kingdom) Tyler	6	4
(Australia) Gourlay	7	6

Third round
1	(United States) Evert	6	6
(United Kingdom) Coles	0	0
9	(United Kingdom) Barker	6	6
(Australia) Gourlay	4	0

Fourth round
1	(United States) Evert	6	6
9	(United Kingdom) Barker	1	0

==== Section 2 ====
First round

Second round
8	(Soviet Union) Morozova	6	6
(United States) Teeguarden	1	1
(United States) Kuykendall	6	6
(United States) Moore	1	3
13	(Soviet Union) Chmyreva	7	5	6
(Australia) Hunt	5	7	3
(United States) Mehmedbasich	1	3
(Czechoslovakia) Tomanová	6	6

Third round
8	(Soviet Union) Morozova	4	3
(United States) Kuykendall	6	6
13	(Soviet Union) Chmyreva	6	6
(Czechoslovakia) Tomanová	2	3

Fourth round
(United States) Kuykendall	6	4	3
13	(Soviet Union) Chmyreva	3	6	6

==== Section 3 ====
First round
4	(United Kingdom) Wade	6	6
(Australia) Turnbull	1	2
(Socialist Federal Republic of Yugoslavia) Jaušovec	6	6
(Australia) Doerner	3	1
(United States) Gerulaitis	6	6
(United States) L Tenney	2	1
(Romania) Simionescu	6	7
(United States) Stap	3	6
(United States) Anthony	6	6
16	(Netherlands) Stöve	4	3
(United States) Louie	6	5	6
(United States) Metcalf	3	7	4
(United Kingdom) Fayter	4	6	6
(United States) Hallquist	6	3	4
(United States) Forood	5	7	7
(United States) Louie	7	5	5

Second round
4	(United Kingdom) Wade	3	3
(Socialist Federal Republic of Yugoslavia) Jaušovec	6	6
(United States) Gerulaitis	6	2	6
(Romania) Simionescu	3	6	1
(United States) Anthony	7	3	2
(United States) Louie	6	6	6
(United Kingdom) Fayter	6	6	6
(United States) Forood	7	3	2

Third round
(Socialist Federal Republic of Yugoslavia) Jaušovec	6	6
(United States) Gerulaitis	4	2
(United States) Louie	6	7
(United Kingdom) Fayter	4	6

Fourth round
(Socialist Federal Republic of Yugoslavia) Jaušovec	6	1
(United States) Louie	0	0	r

==== Section 4 ====
First round
5	(United States) Richey	6	7
(United States) Harter	3	6
(Romania) Ruzici	6	6
(South Africa) Kloss	4	4
(Sweden) Bentzer	6	7
(Sweden) Wikstedt	1	5
(Argentina) Giscafré	6	6
(Australia) Paish	0	3
(United States) May	3	6	7
11	(United States) Guerrant	6	1	6
(United States) Norton	6	6
(Argentina) Weisenberger	0	1
(United States) O'Keefe	6	7
(United States) Michel	1	5
(United States) Antonoplis	6	6
(United States) Susman	4	4

Second round
5	(United States) Richey	6	6	5
(Romania) Ruzici	3	7	7
(Sweden) Bentzer	6	6
(Argentina) Giscafré	3	2
(United States) May	6	4	0
(United States) Norton	3	6	6
(United States) O'Keefe	3	4
(United States) Antonoplis	6	6

Third round
(Romania) Ruzici	7	6
(Sweden) Bentzer	6	2
(United States) Norton	6	6
(United States) Antonoplis	1	4

Fourth round
(Romania) Ruzici	6	6
(United States) Norton	3	3

==== Section 5 ====
First round
(United States) Evert	6	6
(United States) Fox	0	3
(United States) Overton	6	7
(United States) Desfor	0	5
(United States) Kiyomura	6	6
(United States) Greer	1	4
(United States) duPont	6	6
14	(United States) Meyer	4	0
(France) Lovera	6	6
(Colombia) Fernández-De Soto	2	1
(United States) Hamm	6	7
(United States) Redondo	2	6
(United States) Liess	6	6
(United States) Stuart	0	2
7	(Australia) Reid	6	6
(United States) Thomas	3	1

Second round
(United States) Evert	1	1
(United States) Overton	6	6
(United States) Kiyomura	6	6
(United States) duPont	3	2
(France) Lovera	5	2
(United States) Hamm	7	6
(United States) Liess	5
7	(Australia) Reid	5	r

Third round
(United States) Overton	6	6
(United States) Kiyomura	1	2
(United States) Hamm	4	2
(United States) Liess	6	6

Fourth round
(United States) Overton	3	4
(United States) Liess	6	6

==== Section 6 ====
First round
(United States) Russell	6	7
(United States) Epstein	1	6
(United States) Stark	6	7
(Romania) Mihai	2	5
(West Germany) Riedel	4	6	6
(Netherlands) Zwaan	6	3	4
10	(Australia) Fromholtz	6	6
(Belgium) Gurdal	1	1
(United States) Nagelsen	7	6
(South Africa) Boshoff	5	3
(South Africa) Cuypers	7	6
(United States) R Tenney	5	2
(United States) Bruning	6	6
(Uruguay) Bonicelli	3	2
(United States) Newberry	1	6	6
3	(United States) Navratilova	6	4	3

Second round
(United States) Russell	6	6
(United States) Stark	1	4
(West Germany) Riedel	1	2
10	(Australia) Fromholtz	6	6
(United States) Nagelsen	6	6
(South Africa) Cuypers	3	3
(United States) Bruning	3	5
(United States) Newberry	6	7

Third round
(United States) Russell	4	4
10	(Australia) Fromholtz	6	6
(United States) Nagelsen	5	6	2
(United States) Newberry	7	3	6

Fourth round
10	(Australia) Fromholtz	6	6
(United States) Newberry	2	4

==== Section 7 ====
First round

Second round
(United States) Kemmer Shaw	6	6
(South Africa) Kruger	3	3
(Brazil) Medrado	3	3
15	(United States) Holladay	6	6
(Brazil) Bueno	2	6	6
(United Kingdom) Beaven	6	1	1
(South Africa) Du Plooy	5	6	5
6	(United States) Casals	7	1	7

Third round
(United States) Kemmer Shaw	6	5	3
15	(United States) Holladay	4	7	6
(Brazil) Bueno	5	0
6	(United States) Casals	7	6

Fourth round
15	(United States) Holladay	5	1
6	(United States) Casals	7	6

==== Section 8 ====
First round

Second round
(United States) Yeargin	1	3
(Netherlands) Vessies	6	6
(Italy) Simmonds	0	3
12	(France) Dürr	6	6
(Czechoslovakia) Maršíková	6	6
(United States) Tolleson	1	2
(United States) Ziegenfuss	3	1
2	(Australia) Goolagong	6	6

Third round
(Netherlands) Vessies	6	4	3
12	(France) Dürr	2	6	6
(Czechoslovakia) Maršíková	6	3
2	(Australia) Goolagong	7	6

Fourth round
12	(France) Dürr	2	2
2	(Australia) Goolagong	6	6

Preceded by 1976 Wimbledon Championships – Women's singles	Grand Slam women's singles	Succeeded by 1977 Australian Open (January) – Women's singles
