= 1976 U.S. Clay Court Championships – Men's doubles =

Men's doubles
- 1976 U.S. Clay Court Championships

Final
- Champions: (United States) Brian Gottfried (Mexico) Raúl Ramírez
- Runners-up: (Australia) Fred McNair (United States) Sherwood Stewart
- Score: 6–2, 6–2

Details
- Draw: 32
- Seeds: 8

Events
Singles	men	women
Doubles	men	women
- U.S. Clay Court Championships

Juan Gisbert and Manuel Orantes were the defending champions, but they fell in the first round. Brian Gottfried and Raúl Ramírez claimed the title and $7,000 first-prize money following victory over Fred McNair and Sherwood Stewart in the final.

== Seeds ==
A champion seed is indicated in bold text while text in italics indicates the round in which that seed was eliminated.

1. (United States) **Brian Gottfried / (Mexico) Raúl Ramírez (champions)**
2. (United States) Fred McNair / (United States) Sherwood Stewart (final)
3. (Spain) Juan Gisbert / (Spain) Manuel Orantes (first round)
4. (United States) Jimmy Connors / (United States) Erik van Dillen (withdrew — Connors' back strain)
5. (Poland) Wojciech Fibak / (West Germany) Karl Meiler (second round)
6. (West Germany) Jürgen Fassbender / (West Germany) Hans-Jürgen Pohmann (quarterfinals)
7. (United States) Eddie Dibbs / (United States) Harold Solomon (second round)
8. (Argentina) Ricardo Cano / (Argentina) Guillermo Vilas (quarterfinals)

== Draw ==
Key

- Q = Qualifier
- WC = Wild card
- LL = Lucky loser
- Alt = Alternate
- ITF = ITF entry
- PR = Protected ranking
- SR = Special ranking
- SE = Special exempt
- JE = Junior exempt
- JR = Junior Accelerator Programme entrant
- CO = College Accelerator Programme entrant
- NG = Next Gen Accelerator Program entrant
- w/o = Walkover
- r = Retired
- d = Defaulted

=== Finals ===
Semifinals
1	**(United States) Brian Gottfried** **(Mexico) Raúl Ramírez**	**7**	**6**
(Chile) Patricio Cornejo (Chile) Jaime Fillol	5	1
(Socialist Federal Republic of Yugoslavia) Željko Franulović (New Zealand) Onny Parun	6	**6**	2
2	**(United States) Fred McNair** **(United States) Sherwood Stewart**	**7**	2	**6**

Final
1	**(United States) Brian Gottfried** **(Mexico) Raúl Ramírez**	**6**	**6**
2	(United States) Fred McNair (United States) Sherwood Stewart	2	2

=== Top half ===
First round
1	**(United States) B Gottfried** **(Mexico) R Ramírez**	**6**	**6**
(Egypt) I El Shafei (New Zealand) B Fairlie	2	4
(Australia) D Crealy (Australia) K Warwick	4	6
**(Colombia) I Molina** **(Colombia) J Velasco**	**6**	**7**
6	**(West Germany) J Fassbender** **(West Germany) H-J Pohmann**	**6**	**7**
(United States) J Delaney (United States) T Gullikson	4	5
(United States) J Borowiak (United States) B Martin	2	6
**(India) A Amritraj** **(Austria) H Kary**	**6**	**7**
3	(Spain) J Gisbert (Spain) M Orantes	**6**	5	2
**(Australia) M Edmondson** **(Australia) J Marks**	1	**7**	**6**
(United States) R Reid (Netherlands) R Thung	**6**	4	2
**(Chile) P Cornejo** **(Chile) J Fillol**	1	**6**	**6**
8	**(Argentina) R Cano** **(Argentina) G Vilas**	**6**	4	**6**
(United Kingdom) G Battrick (United States) N Holmes	3	**6**	2
**(United Kingdom) B Mottram** **(Socialist Federal Republic of Yugoslavia) N Špear**	**6**	**7**
(France) F Jauffret (France) D Naegelen	3	6

Second round
1	**(United States) B Gottfried** **(Mexico) R Ramírez**	**6**	**6**
(Colombia) I Molina (Colombia) J Velasco	1	1
6	**(West Germany) J Fassbender** **(West Germany) H-J Pohmann**	**6**	**6**
(India) A Amritraj (Austria) H Kary	2	1
(Australia) M Edmondson (Australia) J Marks	2	**6**	6
**(Chile) P Cornejo** **(Chile) J Fillol**	**6**	3	**7**
8	**(Argentina) R Cano** **(Argentina) G Vilas**	**6**	**6**
(United Kingdom) B Mottram (Socialist Federal Republic of Yugoslavia) N Špear	4	3

Quarterfinals
1	**(United States) B Gottfried** **(Mexico) R Ramírez**	**7**	**6**
6	(West Germany) J Fassbender (West Germany) H-J Pohmann	6	1
**(Chile) P Cornejo** **(Chile) J Fillol**	6	**6**	**6**
8	(Argentina) R Cano (Argentina) G Vilas	**7**	4	2

Semifinals
1	**(United States) B Gottfried** **(Mexico) R Ramírez**	**7**	**6**
(Chile) P Cornejo (Chile) J Fillol	5	1

=== Bottom half ===
First round
(United States) B Teacher (United States) T Waltke	4	4
**(Argentina) E Álvarez** **(Paraguay) V Pecci**	**6**	**6**
(United States) K McMillan (Australia) B Phillips-Moore	2	2
5	**(Poland) W Fibak** **(West Germany) K Meiler**	**6**	**6**
**(Socialist Federal Republic of Yugoslavia) Ž Franulović** **(New Zealand) O Parun**	**6**	**7**
(United States) H Bunis (United States) R Fisher	2	5
**(Rhodesia) C Dowdeswell** **(India) S Menon**	w/o
4	(United States) J Connors (United States) E van Dillen
**(South Africa) B Bertram** **(South Africa) P Cramer**	**6**	**6**
(United States) P Fleming (United States) F Taygan	3	4
(United States) M Cahill (United States) J Whitlinger	4	5
7	**(United States) E Dibbs** **(United States) H Solomon**	**6**	**7**
(Colombia) Á Betancur (Chile) Á Fillol	3	2
**(United States) V Amaya** **(United States) P DuPré**	**6**	**6**
(United States) H Pfister (United States) B Scanlon	6	3
2	**(United States) F McNair** **(United States) S Stewart**	**7**	**6**

Second round
**(Argentina) E Álvarez** **(Paraguay) V Pecci**	2	**7**	**6**
5	(Poland) W Fibak (West Germany) K Meiler	**6**	6	4
**(Socialist Federal Republic of Yugoslavia) Ž Franulović** **(New Zealand) O Parun**	**7**	3	**7**
(Rhodesia) C Dowdeswell (India) S Menon	6	**6**	6
**(South Africa) B Bertram** **(South Africa) P Cramer**	**6**	**6**
7	(United States) E Dibbs (United States) H Solomon	4	2
(United States) V Amaya (United States) P DuPré	6	6
2	**(United States) F McNair** **(United States) S Stewart**	**7**	**7**

Quarterfinals
(Argentina) E Álvarez (Paraguay) V Pecci	6	3
**(Socialist Federal Republic of Yugoslavia) Ž Franulović** **(New Zealand) O Parun**	**7**	**6**
(South Africa) B Bertram (South Africa) P Cramer	3	3
2	**(United States) F McNair** **(United States) S Stewart**	**6**	**6**

Semifinals
(Socialist Federal Republic of Yugoslavia) Ž Franulović (New Zealand) O Parun	6	**6**	2
2	**(United States) F McNair** **(United States) S Stewart**	**7**	2	**6**
