= 1976 US Open – Men's singles =

Men's singles
- 1976 US Open

Final
- Champion: (United States) Jimmy Connors
- Runner-up: (Sweden) Björn Borg
- Score: 6–4, 3–6, 7–6^{(11–9)}, 6–4

Details
- Draw: 128
- Seeds: 16

Events
Singles	men	women		boys	girls
Doubles	men	women	mixed	boys	girls
WC Singles	men	women	quad
WC Doubles	men	women	quad
Legends	men	women	mixed
- US Open

Jimmy Connors defeated Björn Borg in the final, 6–4, 3–6, 7–6^{(11–9)}, 6–4 to win the men's singles tennis title at the 1976 US Open. It was his second US Open singles title and fourth major singles title overall. Borg had four set points in the third set of the final, before eventually losing in four sets. It was Borg's first of four runner-up finishes at the US Open, his career-best result at the event.

Manuel Orantes was the defending champion, but lost in the quarterfinals to Borg.

The first three rounds were best-of-three sets.

== Seeds ==
The seeded players are listed below. Jimmy Connors is the champion; others show the round in which they were eliminated.

1. (United States) Jimmy Connors (champion)
2. (Sweden) Björn Borg (finalist)
3. (Argentina) Guillermo Vilas (semifinalist)
4. (Italy) Adriano Panatta (second round)
5. (Romania) Ilie Năstase (semifinalist)
6. (Spain) Manuel Orantes (quarterfinalist)
7. (United States) Arthur Ashe (second round)
8. (Mexico) Raúl Ramírez (second round)
9. (United States) Eddie Dibbs (quarterfinalist)
10. (United States) Harold Solomon (first round)
11. (United States) Roscoe Tanner (fourth round)
12. (United States) Stan Smith (fourth round)
13. (Italy) Corrado Barazzutti (second round)
14. (Poland) Wojtek Fibak (first round)
15. (United States) Brian Gottfried (fourth round)
16. (United States) Vitas Gerulaitis (fourth round)

== Draw ==
=== Key ===
- Q = Qualifier
- WC = Wild card
- LL = Lucky loser
- r = Retired

=== Final eight ===
Quarterfinals
1	(United States) Jimmy Connors	7	6	6
(Czechoslovakia) Jan Kodeš	5	3	1
3	(Argentina) Guillermo Vilas	6	2	7^{7}	7^{7}
9	(United States) Eddie Dibbs	1	6	6^{5}	6^{2}
5	(Romania) Ilie Năstase	4	6	6	6
(United States) Dick Stockton	6	4	2	3
6	(Spain) Manuel Orantes	6	0	2	7	4
2	(Sweden) Björn Borg	4	6	6	5	6

Semifinals
1	(United States) Jimmy Connors	6	6	6
3	(Argentina) Guillermo Vilas	4	2	1
5	(Romania) Ilie Năstase	3	3	4
2	(Sweden) Björn Borg	6	6	6

Final
1	(United States) Jimmy Connors	6	3	7^{11}	6
2	(Sweden) Björn Borg	4	6	6^{9}	4

=== Section 1 ===
First round
1	(United States) Connors	6	6
(South Africa) Hewitt	3	3
(Argentina) Ganzábal	5	6
(United States) Fleming	7	7
(United States) McNair	6	2	7
(United States) Gullikson	3	6	5
(United Kingdom) Cox	6	6	6
(France) Haillet	3	7	2
16	(United States) Gerulaitis	6	6
(United States) Manson	4	1
(Hungary) Taróczy	6	5
(United States) Krulevitz	7	7
Q	(United States) Mayer	6	6
(Italy) Bertolucci	4	1
(Chile) Prajoux	6	1
(Socialist Federal Republic of Yugoslavia) Franulović	7	6

Second round
1	(United States) Connors	6	6
(United States) Fleming	1	0
(United States) McNair	6	6	6
(United Kingdom) Cox	7	1	0
16	(United States) Gerulaitis	6	6
(United States) Krulevitz	2	2
Q	(United States) Mayer	3	4
(Socialist Federal Republic of Yugoslavia) Franulović	6	6

Third round
1	(United States) Connors	7	6
(United States) McNair	5	3
16	(United States) Gerulaitis	4	6	6
(Socialist Federal Republic of Yugoslavia) Franulović	6	3	2

Fourth round
1	(United States) Connors	6	6	6
16	(United States) Gerulaitis	4	3	1

=== Section 2 ===
First round
7	(United States) Ashe	7	6
(Australia) James	6	3
(Australia) Dent	2	2
(Czechoslovakia) Kodeš	6	6
(Australia) Dibley	6	3
(United States) L. Gottfried	7	6
(United States) Amaya	4	6
(United States) Richey	6	7
10	(United States) Solomon	5	4
(United States) Martin	7	6
(Czechoslovakia) Pála	4	3
(United States) Waltke	6	6
(South Africa) McMillan	7	6
(United States) Teacher	5	1
(United States) Cahill	5	1
(Australia) Ruffels	7	6

Second round
7	(United States) Ashe	1	2
(Czechoslovakia) Kodeš	6	6
(United States) L. Gottfried	1	2
(United States) Richey	6	6
(United States) Martin	3	3
(United States) Waltke	6	6
(South Africa) McMillan	3	6	6
(Australia) Ruffels	6	1	4

Third round
(Czechoslovakia) Kodeš	6	7
(United States) Richey	2	5
(United States) Waltke	4	1
(South Africa) McMillan	6	6

Fourth round
(Czechoslovakia) Kodeš	7	6	2	7
(South Africa) McMillan	6	3	6	6

=== Section 3 ===
First round
3	(Argentina) Vilas	6	6
Q	(South Africa) Schneider	4	4
(Australia) Case	2	6	7
Q	(United States) Guerry	6	3	5
(France) Caujolle	6	6
(United States) McManus	1	1
(Rhodesia) Pattison	1	6	3
(Sweden) Johansson	6	4	6
13	(Italy) Barazzutti	6	6
(Australia) Kronk	4	0
Q	(South Africa) Yuill	6	6
(United States) Turner	1	2
(Bolivia) Benavides	3	6	3
(Australia) Gardiner	6	2	6
(Australia) Edmondson	5	6
Q	(Soviet Union) Kakoulia	7	7

Second round
3	(Argentina) Vilas	6	6
(Australia) Case	2	4
(France) Caujolle	4	7	4
(Sweden) Johansson	6	5	6
13	(Italy) Barazzutti	3	6
Q	(South Africa) Yuill	6	7
(Australia) Gardiner	4	4
Q	(Soviet Union) Kakoulia	6	6

Third round
3	(Argentina) Vilas	6
(Sweden) Johansson	3	r
Q	(South Africa) Yuill	7	6	3
Q	(Soviet Union) Kakoulia	6	7	6

Fourth round
3	(Argentina) Vilas	7	6	6
Q	(Soviet Union) Kakoulia	5	4	0

=== Section 4 ===
First round
8	(Mexico) Ramírez	7	6
(France) Proisy	6	0
(New Zealand) Fairlie	0	4
(Rhodesia) Dowdeswell	6	6
(United States) Meyers	7	3	1
(United States) Seewagen	6	6	6
(United States) Du Pré	4	2
(United States) Lutz	6	6
9	(United States) Dibbs	6	6
(United States) Pasarell	2	2
(United States) Friedler	2	7	4
(United States) Bunis	6	5	6
(United States) Stewart	3	6	5
Q	(United States) Winitsky	6	1	7
(Australia) Alexander	6	6
(United Kingdom) Mottram	4	2

Second round
8	(Mexico) Ramírez	4	4
(Rhodesia) Dowdeswell	6	6
(United States) Seewagen	1	4
(United States) Lutz	6	6
9	(United States) Dibbs	6	6
(United States) Bunis	2	1
Q	(United States) Winitsky	1	3
(Australia) Alexander	6	6

Third round
(Rhodesia) Dowdeswell	7	6
(United States) Lutz	6	2
9	(United States) Dibbs	7	7
(Australia) Alexander	6	6

Fourth round
(Rhodesia) Dowdeswell	2	4	2
9	(United States) Dibbs	6	6	6

=== Section 5 ===
First round
(Australia) Warwick	6	6
(India) Amritraj	4	4
(Paraguay) Pecci Sr.	7	6
(Spain) Gisbert Sr	5	3
(Colombia) Molina	3	6
(United States) Delaney	6	7
(United States) Estep	3	4
11	(United States) Tanner	6	6
(United States) Holmes	6	6	6
(United States) Bohrnstedt	0	7	1
Q	(United States) Machette	6	4	3
(United States) Riessen	4	6	6
(United States) Van Dillen	6	3
(West Germany) Pohmann	7	6
(New Zealand) Parun	w/o
5	(Romania) Năstase

Second round
(Australia) Warwick	6	7
(Paraguay) Pecci Sr.	4	5
(United States) Delaney	6	6
11	(United States) Tanner	7	7
(United States) Holmes	3	6
(United States) Riessen	6	7
(West Germany) Pohmann	6	6	6
5	(Romania) Năstase	7	4	7

Third round
(Australia) Warwick	2	4
11	(United States) Tanner	6	6
(United States) Riessen	2	5
5	(Romania) Năstase	6	7

Fourth round
11	(United States) Tanner	5	7^{7}	6	6	4
5	(Romania) Năstase	7	6^{4}	1	7	6

=== Section 6 ===
First round
(South Africa) Bertram	3	1
(United States) Stockton	6	6
(Australia) Bartlett	3	5
(India) Menon	6	7
(Australia) Masters	7	6
(Australia) Crealy	6	2
(South Africa) Moore	7	6	6
14	(Poland) Fibak	5	7	2
(Colombia) Velasco Sr.	6	6
(United States) Taygan	2	3
(Australia) Phillips-Moore	6	6
Q	(United States) Giammalva	2	2
(United States) Scanlon	6	6
(United States) Mitchell	2	1
(Sweden) Bengtson	1	6
4	(Italy) Panatta	6	7

Second round
(United States) Stockton	6	6
(India) Menon	1	2
(Australia) Masters	6	2	5
(South Africa) Moore	3	6	7
(Colombia) Velasco Sr.	2	6	6
(Australia) Phillips-Moore	6	3	4
(United States) Scanlon	6	7
4	(Italy) Panatta	3	6

Third round
(United States) Stockton	6	7
(South Africa) Moore	2	6
(Colombia) Velasco Sr.	6	6
(United States) Scanlon	4	2

Fourth round
(United States) Stockton	6	7	6
(Colombia) Velasco Sr.	3	5	4

=== Section 7 ===
First round
(Colombia) Betancur	6	5
(United Kingdom) Battrick	7	7
(Argentina) Cano	7	6
(United States) Whitlinger	5	4
(United States) Moor	6	3	6
Q	(Sweden) Norberg	4	6	2
(Australia) Ball	3	4
12	(United States) Smith	6	6
(Egypt) El Shafei	4	6	6
(France) Deblicker	6	3	4
(Australia) Stone	6	6
(Austria) Kary	2	2
(Venezuela) Andrew	7	6
(South Africa) Mitton	6	3
(Japan) Kuki	5	1
6	(Spain) Orantes	7	6

Second round
(United Kingdom) Battrick	6	7	3
(Argentina) Cano	7	5	6
(United States) Moor	0	1
12	(United States) Smith	6	6
(Egypt) El Shafei	0	1
(Australia) Stone	6	6
(Venezuela) Andrew	6	2
6	(Spain) Orantes	7	6

Third round
(Argentina) Cano	0	1
12	(United States) Smith	6	6
(Australia) Stone	2	2
6	(Spain) Orantes	6	6

Fourth round
12	(United States) Smith	6	6	2	6	1
6	(Spain) Orantes	3	1	6	7	6

=== Section 8 ===
First round
Q	(Socialist Federal Republic of Yugoslavia) Špear	3	3
(Netherlands) Okker	6	6
Q	(United States) Walts	6	6	4
(Spain) Higueras	4	7	6
(Soviet Union) Metreveli	6	6
(Netherlands) Thung	1	3
(Czechoslovakia) Hřebec	1	1
15	(United States) B. Gottfried	6	6
(South Africa) Cramer	3	1
(United Kingdom) Lloyd	6	6
(United States) Reid	6	3	1
(United States) Saviano	4	6	6
Q	(United States) Díaz	4	3
(Chile) Fillol Sr.	6	6
(Australia) Letcher	2	2
2	(Sweden) Borg	6	6

Second round
(Netherlands) Okker	6	7
(Spain) Higueras	3	5
(Soviet Union) Metreveli	4	5
15	(United States) B. Gottfried	6	7
(United Kingdom) Lloyd	6	6
(United States) Saviano	4	0
(Chile) Fillol Sr.	6	2	6^{5}
2	(Sweden) Borg	4	6	7^{7}

Third round
(Netherlands) Okker	2	2
15	(United States) B. Gottfried	6	6
(United Kingdom) Lloyd	3	3
2	(Sweden) Borg	6	6

Fourth round
15	(United States) B. Gottfried	7^{7}	6	4	4	2
2	(Sweden) Borg	6^{3}	3	6	6	6

Preceded by 1976 Wimbledon Championships – Men's singles	Grand Slam men's singles	Succeeded by 1977 Australian Open (January) – Men's singles
