= 1976 U.S. Clay Court Championships – Men's singles =

Men's singles
- 1976 U.S. Clay Court Championships

Final
- Champion: (United States) Jimmy Connors
- Runner-up: (Poland) Wojciech Fibak
- Score: 6–2, 6–4

Details
- Draw: 64
- Seeds: 16

Events
Singles	men	women
Doubles	men	women
- U.S. Clay Court Championships

Manuel Orantes was the defending champion but lost in the quarterfinals. Jimmy Connors won the title for the second time and $25,000 prize money by defeating Wojciech Fibak in the final.

== Seeds ==
A champion seed is indicated in bold text while text in italics indicates the round in which that seed was eliminated.

1. (United States) **Jimmy Connors (champion)**
2. (Argentina) Guillermo Vilas (semifinals)
3. (Spain) Manuel Orantes (quarterfinals)
4. (Mexico) Raúl Ramírez (second round)
5. (United States) Eddie Dibbs (quarterfinals)
6. (United States) Harold Solomon (semifinals)
7. (Chile) Jaime Fillol (third round)
8. (United States) Brian Gottfried (quarterfinals)
9. (New Zealand) Onny Parun (third round)
10. (France) François Jauffret (third round)
11. (Poland) Wojciech Fibak (final)
12. (South Africa) Ray Moore (third round)
13. (West Germany) Karl Meiler (third round)
14. (United Kingdom) Buster Mottram (quarterfinals)
15. (Argentina) Ricardo Cano (third round)
16. (United States) Jeff Borowiak (second round)

== Draw ==
Key

- Q = Qualifier
- WC = Wild card
- LL = Lucky loser
- Alt = Alternate
- ITF = ITF entry
- PR = Protected ranking
- SR = Special ranking
- SE = Special exempt
- JE = Junior exempt
- JR = Junior Accelerator Programme entrant
- CO = College Accelerator Programme entrant
- NG = Next Gen Accelerator Program entrant
- w/o = Walkover
- r = Retired
- d = Defaulted

=== Finals ===
Quarterfinals
1	**(United States) Jimmy Connors**	**6**	**6**
5	(United States) Eddie Dibbs	4	3
3	(Spain) Manuel Orantes	2	**6**	4
6	**(United States) Harold Solomon**	**6**	4	**6**
11	**(Poland) Wojciech Fibak**	**6**	**6**
14	(United Kingdom) Buster Mottram	4	3
8	(United States) Brian Gottfried	2	3
2	**(Argentina) Guillermo Vilas**	**6**	**6**

Semifinals
1	**(United States) Jimmy Connors**	**6**	**7**
6	(United States) Harold Solomon	2	5
11	**(Poland) Wojciech Fibak**	**7**	**7**
2	(Argentina) Guillermo Vilas	5	6

Final
1	**(United States) Jimmy Connors**	**6**	**6**
11	(Poland) Wojciech Fibak	2	4

=== Top half ===
==== Section 1 ====
First round
1	**(United States) J Connors**	**6**	6	**3**
**(Australia) C Dibley**	4	**7**	0^{r}
(United States) J Whitlinger	1	4
**(United States) V Amaya**	**6**	**6**
13	**(West Germany) K Meiler**	**6**	**7**
(West Germany) J Fassbender	3	5
(United States) J Delaney	2	6
**(New Zealand) B Fairlie**	**6**	**7**
5	**(United States) E Dibbs**	**7**	**6**
(United States) Tim Gullikson	5	3
**(Colombia) I Molina**	**6**	**6**
(United States) N Holmes	4	3
10	**(France) F Jauffret**	**6**	**6**
(Austria) H Kary	2	1
(United States) T Waltke	4	2
**(West Germany) H-J Pohmann**	**6**	**6**

Second round
1	**(United States) J Connors**	**6**	**7**
(United States) V Amaya	2	5
13	**(West Germany) K Meiler**	**6**	**6**
(New Zealand) B Fairlie	4	1
5	**(United States) E Dibbs**	**7**	**6**
(Colombia) I Molina	5	2
10	**(France) F Jauffret**	1	**6**	**6**
(West Germany) H-J Pohmann	**6**	2	3

Third round
1	**(United States) J Connors**	**7**	**6**
13	(West Germany) K Meiler	5	3
5	**(United States) E Dibbs**	**6**	**6**
10	(France) F Jauffret	3	1

Quarterfinals
1	**(United States) J Connors**	**6**	**6**
5	(United States) E Dibbs	4	3

==== Section 2 ====
First round
3	**(Spain) M Orantes**	**6**	**6**
(Argentina) J Ganzábal	0	2
Q	**(West Germany) F Gebert**	**6**	**6**
(South Africa) D Joubert	2	1
15	**(Argentina) R Cano**	**6**	**6**
(Socialist Federal Republic of Yugoslavia) Ž Franulović	2	3
**(United Kingdom) M Wayman**	4	**6**	**6**
(Australia) B Lloyd	**6**	3	4
6	**(United States) H Solomon**	3	**6**	**6**
(Australia) K Warwick	**6**	3	2
(Spain) J Gisbert	**6**	2	6
Q	**(Colombia) Á Betancur**	4	**6**	**7**
12	**(South Africa) R Moore**	**6**	**6**
(India) S Menon	2	1
(Rhodesia) C Dowdeswell	3	5
**(Brazil) T Koch**	**6**	**7**

Second round
3	**(Spain) M Orantes**	**7**	**6**
Q	(West Germany) F Gebert	5	0
15	**(Argentina) R Cano**	**7**	**6**
(United Kingdom) M Wayman	6	4
6	**(United States) H Solomon**	**6**	**6**
Q	(Colombia) Á Betancur	0	2
12	**(South Africa) R Moore**	**6**	5	**6**
(Brazil) T Koch	4	**7**	3

Third round
3	**(Spain) M Orantes**	**6**	**6**
15	(Argentina) R Cano	1	2
6	**(United States) H Solomon**	**6**	1	**7**
12	(South Africa) R Moore	2	**6**	5

Quarterfinals
3	(Spain) M Orantes	2	**6**	4
6	**(United States) H Solomon**	**6**	4	**6**

=== Bottom half ===
==== Section 3 ====
First round
(India) A Amritraj	2	3
**(United States) B Martin**	**6**	**6**
(United States) E van Dillen	5	**6**	2
11	**(Poland) W Fibak**	**7**	3	**6**
Q	(United States) P DuPré	4	5
**(United States) H Bunis**	**6**	**7**
(Paraguay) V Pecci	1	**7**	4
7	**(Chile) J Fillol**	**6**	6	**6**
**(South Africa) B Bertram**	**6**	**6**
(United States) B Teacher	2	4
(Australia) B Phillips-Moore	2	2
14	**(United Kingdom) B Mottram**	**6**	**6**
(United Kingdom) G Battrick	**7**	2	0
**(Australia) M Edmondson**	5	**6**	**6**
(South Africa) P Cramer	2	1
4	**(Mexico) R Ramírez**	**6**	**6**

Second round
(United States) B Martin	**6**	3	4
11	**(Poland) W Fibak**	3	**6**	**6**
(United States) H Bunis	**6**	2	3
7	**(Chile) J Fillol**	3	**6**	**6**
(South Africa) B Bertram	**6**	3	2
14	**(United Kingdom) B Mottram**	4	**6**	**6**
**(Australia) M Edmondson**	1	**7**	**7**
4	(Mexico) R Ramírez	**6**	6	5

Third round
11	**(Poland) W Fibak**	**6**	**6**
7	(Chile) J Fillol	2	0
14	**(United Kingdom) B Mottram**	**6**	**6**
(Australia) M Edmondson	4	3

Quarterfinals
11	**(Poland) W Fibak**	**6**	**6**
14	(United Kingdom) B Mottram	4	3

==== Section 4 ====
First round
(United States) S Stewart	2	1
**(Colombia) J Velasco**	**6**	**6**
(United States) B Manson	3	4
9	**(New Zealand) O Parun**	**6**	**6**
(United States) E Friedler	**6**	3	4
**(United States) B Scanlon**	4	**6**	**6**
(United States) M Cahill	4	4
8	**(United States) B Gottfried**	**6**	**6**
(Japan) J Kuki	4	4
**(Australia) D Crealy**	**6**	**6**
(Egypt) I El Shafei	6	**7**	2
16	**(United States) J Borowiak**	**7**	6	**6**
Q	(United States) G Mayer	**6**	1	3
**(United States) C Richey**	3	**6**	**6**
(United States) H Pfister	5	2
2	**(Argentina) G Vilas**	**7**	**6**

Second round
(Colombia) J Velasco	6	4
9	**(New Zealand) O Parun**	**7**	**6**
(United States) B Scanlon	3	2
8	**(United States) B Gottfried**	**6**	**6**
**(Australia) D Crealy**	**6**	5	**6**
16	(United States) J Borowiak	4	**7**	1
(United States) C Richey	1	2
2	**(Argentina) G Vilas**	**6**	**6**

Third round
9	(New Zealand) O Parun	5	1
8	**(United States) B Gottfried**	**7**	**6**
(Australia) D Crealy	1	0^{r}
2	**(Argentina) G Vilas**	**6**	1

Quarterfinals
8	(United States) B Gottfried	2	3
2	**(Argentina) G Vilas**	**6**	**6**
