= 1976 U.S. Clay Court Championships =

Tennis tournament

- Date: August 9–16
- Edition: 8th
- Category: Grand Prix circuit (Four star); WTA Tour
- Draw: 64S/32D (M); 48S/24D (W)
- Prize money: $125,000 (M) $32,000 (W)
- Surface: Clay / outdoor
- Location: Indianapolis, Indiana; United States

Champions

Men's singles
- (United States) Jimmy Connors

Women's singles
- (United States) Kathy May

Men's doubles
- (United States) Brian Gottfried / (Mexico) Raúl Ramírez

Women's doubles
- (South Africa) Linky Boshoff / (South Africa) Ilana Kloss
- U.S. Clay Court Championships

The 1976 U.S. Clay Court Championships was a tennis tournament that was part of the men's Grand Prix and the women's Grand Prix. It was held in Indianapolis in the United States and played on outdoor clay courts. It was the eighth edition of the tournament in the Open Era and was held from August 9 through August 16, 1976. First-seeded Jimmy Connors won the singles title and the accompanying $25,000 first-prize money. Kathy May claimed the women's title and $6,000 in prize money.

== Finals ==
=== Men's singles ===
(United States) Jimmy Connors defeated (Poland) Wojciech Fibak 6–2, 6–4

=== Women's singles ===
(United States) Kathy May defeated (South Africa) Brigitte Cuypers 6–4, 4–6, 6–2

=== Men's doubles ===
(United States) Brian Gottfried / (Mexico) Raúl Ramírez defeated (United States) Fred McNair / (United States) Sherwood Stewart 6–2, 6–2

=== Women's doubles ===
(South Africa) Linky Boshoff / (South Africa) Ilana Kloss defeated (United States) Laura duPont / (Australia) Wendy Turnbull 6–2, 6–3
