= Steve Siegel =

American tennis player

- Full name: Steve Siegel
- Country (sports): United States
- Born: September 4, 1948 (age 77) New York City

Singles
- Career record: 1–14
- Highest ranking: No. 244 (September 27, 1974)

Grand Slam singles results
- French Open: 1R (1973)
- US Open: 1R (1973)

Doubles
- Career record: 5–3
- Career titles: 1
- Highest ranking: No. 246 (March 1, 1976)

Grand Slam doubles results
- US Open: 2R (1975)

Grand Slam mixed doubles results
- French Open: 1R (1973)
- US Open: 2R (1976)

Steve Siegel (born September 4, 1948) is a former professional tennis player from the United States.

== Biography ==
Siegel, who grew up in Teaneck, New Jersey, won the New Jersey individual tennis state championship in 1966 as a student at Teaneck High School, after finishing as state runner up in 1964. He then played briefly on the international tennis circuit in the 1970s.

He didn't make an impact on the Grand Prix singles tour, but won a set against Arthur Ashe at a WTC tournament in Washington DC in 1972.

The following year he made two main draw appearances in Grand Slam singles draws, the 1973 French Open and 1973 US Open.

He won a Grand Prix doubles title at the Cedar Grove Open in 1974, partnering Australian player Kim Warwick. In the final they defeated Dick Crealy and Bob Tanis in three sets.

His subsequent US Open appearances were in doubles. He made the second round of the 1975 US Open men's doubles with American partner Steve Turner, as they defeated the Swedish team of Björn Andersson and Kjell Johansson in the first round, and then lost in the second round to Australians Phil Dent and Bill Lloyd. He also made the second round of 1976 US Open mixed doubles with Janice Metcalf. There, he again played men's doubles with Steve Turner, and they lost in the first round to Americans James Delaney and Mike Machette.

== Grand Prix career finals ==
=== Doubles: 1 (1–0) ===
Result	W/L	Date	Tournament	Surface	Partner	Opponents	Score
Win	1–0	Sep 1974	Cedar Grove, U.S.	Hard	(Australia) Kim Warwick	(Australia) Dick Crealy (United States) Bob Tanis	4–6, 6–2, 6–1
