= 1976 US Open – Women's doubles =

Women's doubles
- 1976 US Open

Final
- Champion: (South Africa) Linky Boshoff (South Africa) Ilana Kloss
- Runner-up: (Soviet Union) Olga Morozova (United Kingdom) Virginia Wade
- Score: 6–1, 6–4

Events
Singles	men	women		boys	girls
Doubles	men	women	mixed	boys	girls
WC Singles	men	women	quad
WC Doubles	men	women	quad
Legends	men	women	mixed
← 1975 ·	US Open	· 1977 →

Margaret Court and Virginia Wade were the defending champions but only Wade competed that year. Wade and Olga Morozova lost in the final 6–1, 6–4 against Linky Boshoff and Ilana Kloss.

== Seeds ==
1. (United States) Billie Jean King / (Netherlands) Betty Stöve (quarterfinals)
2. (United States) Mona Guerrant / (United States) Ann Kiyomura (semifinals)
3. (Soviet Union) Olga Morozova / (United Kingdom) Virginia Wade (final)
4. (United States) Rosie Casals / (France) Françoise Dürr (quarterfinals)
5. (South Africa) Linky Boshoff / (South Africa) Ilana Kloss (champions)
6. (United Kingdom) Sue Barker / (Soviet Union) Natasha Chmyreva (quarterfinals)
7. (United States) Carrie Meyer / (United States) Wendy Overton (third round)
8. (Uruguay) Fiorella Bonicelli / (Colombia) Isabel Fernández de Soto (second round)

== Draw ==
=== Key ===
- Q = Qualifier
- WC = Wild card
- LL = Lucky loser
- Alt = Alternate
- SE = Special exempt
- PR = Protected ranking
- ITF = ITF entry
- JE = Junior exempt
- w/o = Walkover
- r = Retired
- d = Defaulted
- SR = Special ranking

=== Finals ===
Quarterfinals
1	(United States) Billie Jean King (Netherlands) Betty Stöve	4	6	2
5	(South Africa) Linky Boshoff (South Africa) Ilana Kloss	6	3	6
4	(United States) Rosie Casals (France) Françoise Dürr	4	6	6
(Socialist Federal Republic of Yugoslavia) Mima Jaušovec (Romania) Virginia Ruzici	6	4	7
6	(United Kingdom) Sue Barker (Soviet Union) Natasha Chmyreva	2	1
3	(Soviet Union) Olga Morozova (United Kingdom) Virginia Wade	6	6
(United States) Laura duPont (Australia) Wendy Turnbull	4	2
2	(United States) Mona Guerrant (United States) Ann Kiyomura	6	6

Semifinals
5	(South Africa) Linky Boshoff (South Africa) Ilana Kloss	6	7
(Socialist Federal Republic of Yugoslavia) Mima Jaušovec (Romania) Virginia Ruzici	1	6
3	(Soviet Union) Olga Morozova (United Kingdom) Virginia Wade	6	6
2	(United States) Mona Guerrant (United States) Ann Kiyomura	2	4

Final
5	(South Africa) Linky Boshoff (South Africa) Ilana Kloss	6	6
3	(Soviet Union) Olga Morozova (United Kingdom) Virginia Wade	1	4

=== Top half ===
==== Section 1 ====
First round

Second round
1	(United States) BJ King (Netherlands) B Stöve	6	6
(United States) J Anthony (United States) V Ziegenfuss	1	3
(Australia) V Lancaster-Kerr (Australia) P Whytcross	6	6
(Belgium) M Gurdal (Japan) N Sato	0	1
5	(South Africa) L Boshoff (South Africa) I Kloss	6	6
(United States) B Buckley (United States) J Nachand	2	4
(United States) L Epstein (United States) L Forood	7	6
(United States) C Beene (United States) L Thomas	5	4

Third round
1	(United States) BJ King (Netherlands) B Stöve	6	7
(Australia) V Lancaster-Kerr (Australia) P Whytcross	3	6
5	(South Africa) L Boshoff (South Africa) I Kloss	6	6
(United States) L Epstein (United States) L Forood	3	1

Quarterfinals
1	(United States) BJ King (Netherlands) B Stöve	4	6	2
5	(South Africa) L Boshoff (South Africa) I Kloss	6	3	6

==== Section 2 ====
First round
4	(United States) R Casals (France) F Dürr	6	6
(United States) K Harter (South Africa) M Kruger	1	3
(United States) M O'Keefe (United States) N Yeargin	1	3
(United States) D Desfor (United States) G Galt	6	6
(United States) S Acker (United States) A Smith	6	6
(United States) Z Liess (United Kingdom) M Tyler	3	3
(Australia) H Gourlay (France) G Benedetti	6	6
(Argentina) R Giscafré (United States) M Louie	4	3
7	(United States) C Meyer (United States) W Overton	5	6	6
(South Africa) B Cuypers (South Africa) A du Plooy	7	3	1
(United States) S Mehmedbasich (Sweden) M Wikstedt	6	4	6
(United Kingdom) J Fayter (Australia) W Paish	3	6	1
(United States) BA Stuart (United States) P Teeguarden	6	6
(United States) A Spex (United States) M Struthers	3	0
(Socialist Federal Republic of Yugoslavia) M Jaušovec (Romania) V Ruzici	2	6	6
(Czechoslovakia) R Maršíková (Czechoslovakia) R Tomanová	6	3	4

Second round
4	(United States) R Casals (France) F Dürr	6	6
(United States) D Desfor (United States) G Galt	2	2
(United States) S Acker (United States) A Smith	4	7	0
(Australia) H Gourlay (France) G Benedetti	6	6	6
7	(United States) C Meyer (United States) W Overton	1	6	6
(United States) S Mehmedbasich (Sweden) M Wikstedt	6	3	0
(United States) BA Stuart (United States) P Teeguarden	3	3
(Socialist Federal Republic of Yugoslavia) M Jaušovec (Romania) V Ruzici	6	6

Third round
4	(United States) R Casals (France) F Dürr	w/o
(Australia) H Gourlay (France) G Benedetti
7	(United States) C Meyer (United States) W Overton
(Socialist Federal Republic of Yugoslavia) M Jaušovec (Romania) V Ruzici	w/o

Quarterfinals
4	(United States) R Casals (France) F Dürr	4	6	6
(Socialist Federal Republic of Yugoslavia) M Jaušovec (Romania) V Ruzici	6	4	7

=== Bottom half ===
==== Section 3 ====
First round
(United States) K Shaw (United States) S Tolleson	1	6	7
(United States) R Gerulaitis (United States) S Stap	6	1	6
(United States) T Holladay (United States) P Smith	6	6
(United States) M Hamm (United States) C Martinez	4	2
(United States) R Fox (United States) K Kuykendall	6	7
(United States) L Antonoplis (United States) S Greer	2	5
(United States) J Newberry (United States) J Russell	3	1
6	(United Kingdom) S Barker (Soviet Union) N Chmyreva	6	6
(Australia) D Fromholtz (United States) B Nagelsen	7	7
(Sweden) I Bentzer (Romania) M Simionescu	6	6
(United Kingdom) L Beaven (United States) S Moore	6	6
(United States) B Hallquist (United States) B Jordan	4	3
(Hungary) B Klein (Hungary) É Szabó	4	3
(United States) R Khan (United States) N Weigel	6	6
(United States) B Bruning (United States) S Walsh	3	1
3	(Soviet Union) O Morozova (United Kingdom) V Wade	6	6

Second round
(United States) K Shaw (United States) S Tolleson	3	4
(United States) T Holladay (United States) P Smith	6	6
(United States) R Fox (United States) K Kuykendall	6	6	6
6	(United Kingdom) S Barker (Soviet Union) N Chmyreva	7	4	7
(Australia) D Fromholtz (United States) B Nagelsen	6	7
(United Kingdom) L Beaven (United States) S Moore	2	6
(United States) R Khan (United States) N Weigel	2	2
3	(Soviet Union) O Morozova (United Kingdom) V Wade	6	6

Third round
(United States) T Holladay (United States) P Smith	4	4
6	(United Kingdom) S Barker (Soviet Union) N Chmyreva	6	6
(Australia) D Fromholtz (United States) B Nagelsen	2	2
3	(Soviet Union) O Morozova (United Kingdom) V Wade	6	6

Quarterfinals
6	(United Kingdom) S Barker (Soviet Union) N Chmyreva	2	1
3	(Soviet Union) O Morozova (United Kingdom) V Wade	6	6

==== Section 4 ====
First round

Second round
(United States) K May (United States) B Norton	6	2	6
(United States) P Bostrom (United States) J Metcalf	3	6	2
(United States) L duPont (Australia) W Turnbull	4	6	6
8	(Uruguay) F Bonicelli (Colombia) I Fernández de Soto	6	3	2
(United Kingdom) G Coles (Romania) F Mihai	6	6
(United States) J Evert (United States) R Stark	1	3
(Australia) C Doerner (United States) M Redondo	1	2
2	(United States) M Guerrant (United States) A Kiyomura	6	6

Third round
(United States) K May (United States) B Norton	3	6	3
(United States) L duPont (Australia) W Turnbull	6	2	6
(United Kingdom) G Coles (Romania) F Mihai	1	0
2	(United States) M Guerrant (United States) A Kiyomura	6	6

Quarterfinals
(United States) L duPont (Australia) W Turnbull	4	2
2	(United States) M Guerrant (United States) A Kiyomura	6	6
