= Wanda Ferraz =

Brazilian tennis player

- Full name: Wanda Ferraz De Oliveira
- Country (sports): Brazil
- Born: 7 June 1949 (age 77)

Grand Slam singles results
- French Open: Q1 (1975)
- Wimbledon: Q1 (1975, 1976)
Medal record
Pan American Games
Silver medal – second place	1975 Mexico City	Women's doubles

Wanda Ferraz De Oliveira (born Wanda Bustamante Ferraz; 7 June 1949), is a Brazilian former tennis player.

Ferrez featured in two Federation Cup ties for Brazil in 1975. She lost a doubles dead rubber in Brazil's World Group elimination by Italy, then won a singles rubber in the consolation round against Luxembourg, over Monique Hendel.

At the 1975 Pan American Games in Mexico City she won a silver medal in the women's doubles competition.
