= Perspectus Tennis Classic =

Defunct tennis tournament
- Tour: ILTF Grand Prix Circuit
- Founded: 1974
- Abolished: 1974
- Editions: 1
- Location: Cedar Grove, New Jersey, USA
- Venue: Bradford & Bath Tennis Club
- Surface: Clay
- Draw: 32S/16Q/32D
- Prize money: $50,000

The Perspectus Tennis Classic or the Perspectus Classic was a men's clay court tennis tournament that was played on the ILTF Grand Prix Circuit in 1974. The event was played at the Bradford & Bath Tennis Club in Cedar Grove, New Jersey. Ilie Năstase won the singles title, while Kim Warwick and Steve Siegel partnered to win the doubles title.

== Finals ==
=== Singles ===
Year	Champion	Runner-up	Score
1974	(Romania) Ilie Năstase	(Spain) Juan Gisbert, Sr.	6–4, 7–6

=== Doubles ===
Year	Champion	Runner-up	Score
1974	(Australia) Kim Warwick (United States) Steve Siegel	(Australia) Dick Crealy (United States) Bob Tanis	4–6, 6–2, 6–1

== Sources ==
- Draws on ITF Site
