= Toshiko Sade =

Japanese tennis player (born 1947)

- Country (sports): Japan
- Born: 8 March 1947 (age 78)

Singles

Grand Slam singles results
- Australian Open: 2R (1974)
- French Open: Q1 (1975)
- Wimbledon: Q1 (1975)

Doubles

Grand Slam doubles results
- Australian Open: 1R (1974)
- Wimbledon: 2R (1975)

Grand Slam mixed doubles results
- Wimbledon: 1R (1975)

Toshiko Sade (born 8 March 1947) is a Japanese former professional tennis player.

Active in the 1970s, Sade appeared at Wimbledon as a doubles player and made the singles main draw of the 1974 Australian Open, where she lost in the second round to Janet Fallis. She was the All Japan singles champion in 1974 and represented Japan at the Asian Games in Tehran that year, winning a gold medal in the women's doubles with Kayoko Fukuoka. In 1975 she featured in six Federation Cup rubbers for Japan and registered two wins.

== See also ==
- List of Japan Fed Cup team representatives
