= Roberta Stark =

American tennis player

- Country (sports): United States
- Born: July 2, 1956 (age 68)

Singles

Grand Slam singles results
- French Open: Q1 (1975)
- Wimbledon: 1R (1975)
- US Open: 2R (1976)

Doubles

Grand Slam doubles results
- US Open: 2R (1976)

Roberta Stark (born July 2, 1956) is an American former professional tennis player.

A native of Jacksonville, Stark competed on the professional tour in the 1970s.

Stark qualified for the main draw of the Wimbledon Championships for the only time in 1975, losing her first round match in three sets to Linda Mottram. In 1976 she had a US Open main draw win over Florența Mihai.
