= Larry Gottfried =

American tennis player

- Country (sports): United States
- Born: December 8, 1959 (age 65); Miami, Florida, USA
- Plays: Right-handed

Singles
- Career record: 5–16 (Grand Prix, WCT and Grand Slam level, and Davis Cup)
- Highest ranking: No. 207 (July 12, 1978)

Grand Slam singles results
- US Open: 2R (1976)

Doubles
- Career record: 3–12 (Grand Prix, WCT and Grand Slam level, and Davis Cup)

Larry Gottfried (born December 8, 1959, in Miami) is a former American male professional tour tennis player. He is the brother of former tennis-star Brian Gottfried.
