= Steve Turner (tennis) =

American tennis player

- Full name: Steven Turner
- Country (sports): United States
- Born: October 17, 1946 (age 80) New York City, New York, U.S.
- Turned pro: 1969
- Retired: 1976
- Plays: Right-handed (one-handed backhand)

Singles
- Career record: 20–57
- Highest ranking: No. 105 (June 14, 1976)

Grand Slam singles results
- French Open: 1R (1976)
- Wimbledon: Q2 (1972)
- US Open: 2R (1975)

Doubles
- Career record: 9–33

Grand Slam doubles results
- French Open: 2R (1976)
- US Open: 2R (1975)

Grand Slam mixed doubles results
- US Open: 1R (1976)

Steven Turner (born October 17, 1946) is an American former professional tennis player, and current tennis coach. He competed on the international circuit during the 1970s. Turner had a career-high singles ranking of world No. 105, which he achieved on June 14, 1976.

Turner was born in New York City and raised in Greenwich Village. He played tennis for Long Island University as the team's top player, graduating in 1969. Turning professional that same year, Turner made his Grand Slam main draw debut at the 1971 US Open. At the 1975 US Open, he defeated former world No. 7 Gene Scott to reach the singles second round. He also reached the second round in the doubles of both the 1975 US Open and the 1976 French Open.

Following his retirement from the primary circuit at the conclusion of the 1976 season, Turner pivoted into a multi-decade coaching career in Manhattan. He became known for his unorthodox instructional techniques, including a dual-forehand system he terms "two-handed tennis." A dedicated scholar of Kabbalah and Freudian psychology, his instructional style heavily incorporates spiritual, meditative, and Freudian philosophies into physical mechanics, matching his unique on-court appearance of wearing his hair in clumped dreadlocks as part of a Jewish mystic Nazirite vow.

== Early life ==
Steven Turner was born on October 17, 1946, in New York City. He spent his childhood there in Greenwich Village, a neighborhood in Lower Manhattan, and is Jewish. Growing up during the 1950s and 1960s, Turner first picked up a tennis racket at the age of six.

He began playing in competitive metropolitan junior tournament circuits when he was seven years old. In his youth, while using a powerful forehand, Turner established himself as highly aggressive, intensely competitive, and promising prospect. When he was not traveling for junior tennis tournaments, he lived with his parents at their residence which at that time was on East 57th Street in Manhattan.

== College ==
After high school, Turner enrolled at New York University, where his personal interests expanded into metaphysics, including the philosophical teachings of George Gurdjieff, Sufism, and the avant-garde theories of Antonin Artaud. However, due to a self-described poor attitude toward his courses and subsequent academic struggles, he was ultimately dismissed from the university.

Turner then transferred to Long Island University (LIU). There, he earned his college degree in 1969.

=== College tennis career and regional tournaments ===
While playing college tennis as the top player for LIU, Turner competed in both college events and in regional Eastern amateur tournaments. In May 1967, competing as an LIU sophomore, he reached the semifinals of the Eastern Tennis Tournament in Woodbury, Long Island. The following month, he finished as the runner-up at the Brooklyn Tennis Championships. Despite facing on-court setbacks and a temporary exclusion from the nationals at Forest Hills, Turner used the period to write poetry and music, and traveled to Europe to refine his game.

Under the guidance of his LIU coach, Turner modified his baseline strokes and on-court attitude, which resulted in highly improved athletic discipline. In January 1968, Turner won the singles and doubles titles at the first annual Concord Hotel Invitational Indoor Intercollegiate Tennis Tournament. Concluding his local competitive career, he paired up with his LIU coach and won the 1969 New York City Parks doubles tennis title.

== Professional tennis career ==
Turner turned professional in 1969 at the age of 23, after graduating from LIU. He made his Grand Slam main draw debut at the 1971 US Open held at the West Side Tennis Club in Forest Hills, New York, where he was eliminated in the first round following a five-set match against Australia's Rod Brent.

At the 1972 French Open, Turner played singles at Roland Garros. He lost in the first round to Australia's Ian Fletcher.

Turner competed in the qualifying draws at the 1972 Wimbledon Championships, where he did not advance to the main singles draw. He won his opening qualifying match in straight sets against Kiyoshi Tanabe of Japan, before being eliminated in the second qualifying round by Robert Clarke of New Zealand.

In August 1972,Turner earned his way back onto the Grand Slam stage alongside American Brian Teacher, as both survived the multi-round qualification brackets to advance directly into the main draw of the 1972 US Open. He was defeated in the first round by 9th seed American Marty Riessen. In doubles, he and Japan's Jun Kuki were defeated in the first round by the Australian team of Number 5 seeds Roy Emerson and Rod Laver (former world # 1 in singles; Emerson and Laver won a combined 44 Grand Slam titles between them).

In Grand Slams, Turner's most notable singles performance took place at the 1975 US Open. There, he won his opening match by defeating fellow American and former world # 7 Gene Scott in the first round, with a straight-sets victory. He was eliminated in the second round by Australian Kim Warwick, in four sets. In doubles, he made a second-round appearance alongside American partner Steve Siegel, as they defeated the Swedish team of Björn Andersson and Kjell Johansson in the first round, and then lost in the second round to Australians Phil Dent and Bill Lloyd.

He competed in the main draw in singles at the 1976 French Open, where Turner was defeated by French player Denis Naegelen in the first round. In doubles, he teamed up with fellow American Steve Krulevitz. They won in straight sets in the first round against the French pairing of Patrice Barthès and Denis Naegelen, and lost in the second round to the Yugoslavian team of Željko Franulović and Nikola Pilić (former world # 6).

At the 1976 US Open, Turner lost in the first round of the main singles draw to South African John Yuill. He played doubles with American Steve Siegel, and they lost in the first round to Americans James Delaney and Mike Machette. He also played alongside Australian Cynthia Doerner at the 1976 US Open in mixed doubles, but they lost in the first round to defending champions Americans Dick Stockton and Rosie Casals.

Turner competed on the international circuit for seven consecutive years in the 1970s, accumulating a 20–57 career singles win–loss record in top-level tournaments. In doubles, Turner posted a 9–33 career match record. He was a dedicated traveling journeyman, spending upwards of 35 weeks on the road per year, traversing tournament routes across Europe, Africa, and the United States. He maintained a close friendship with American tennis player Eddie Dibbs, who at one point was ranked world # 5.

Turner had a career-high Association of Tennis Professionals (ATP) singles ranking of world No. 105, which he achieved on June 14, 1976. He retired from the primary professional tour at the end of the 1976 season.

== Coaching career ==
Turner next pivoted into a long-term coaching career in Manhattan. For more than 30 years, he has taught as a private tennis instructor at an indoor court at the Millennium Hilton New York One UN Plaza (formerly the One UN New York Hotel) on East 44th Street and First Avenue in Manhattan.

Turner's coaching methodologies integrate his spiritual and philosophical backgrounds. He tailors his physical lessons to line up with a student's "total self and spiritual persona." He emphasizes a specialized practice routine against a tennis wall, to develop a meditative approach to the sport. Among his technical instructional innovations is a style he terms "two-handed tennis," which instructs players to rapidly switch their racket between their hands so that they can hit dominant forehands from both sides, eliminating the traditional backhand.

== Personal life ==
Turner, who is Jewish, is a scholar of Kabbalah, an esoteric system of Jewish mystical thought. He incorporates Jewish mysticism into both his personal lifestyle and his coaching. He maintains a distinct appearance, by wearing his hair in two clumped dreadlocks, as part of a Jewish mystic Nazirite vow.
