= Janet Haas =

American tennis player (born 1953)

- Country (sports): United States
- Born: June 28, 1953 (age 71)
- Plays: Right-handed
- College: University of Miami

Singles

Grand Slam singles results
- French Open: 1R (1974)
- Wimbledon: 1R (1975)
- US Open: 1R (1973, 1974)

Doubles

Grand Slam doubles results
- US Open: 1R (1973, 1974)

Grand Slam mixed doubles results
- Wimbledon: 2R (1974)
Medal record
Maccabiah Games
Silver medal – second place	1973 Israel	Women's singles

Janet Haas (born June 28, 1953) is an American former professional tennis player.

The first female tennis player to receive a sports scholarship to the University of Miami, Haas was ranked as high as fourth in the national collegiate rankings. She was the University of Miami's Women's Athlete of the Year in 1973 and is a member of their Sports Hall of Fame.

While touring on the professional circuit she featured in the main draws of the French Open, Wimbledon, and the US Open. She was a quarter-finalist at the 1973 U.S. Clay Court Championships and won a silver medal at the 1973 Maccabiah Games.
