= Mike Machette =

American tennis player

- Full name: Michael Machette
- Country (sports): United States
- Born: January 27, 1951 (age 75) Belvedere, California
- Plays: Right-handed

Singles
- Career record: 32–85
- Career titles: 0
- Highest ranking: No. 90 (January 3, 1977)

Grand Slam singles results
- Australian Open: 1R (1975, 1977 ^{(Jan)}, 1977 ^{(Dec)})
- French Open: 1R (1977)
- Wimbledon: 2R (1973, 1978)
- US Open: 2R (1972, 1974)

Doubles
- Career record: 63–112
- Career titles: 0
- Highest ranking: No. 90 (January 2, 1978)

Grand Slam doubles results
- Australian Open: 2R (1975, 1977 ^{(Jan)})
- French Open: 1R (1977)
- Wimbledon: QF (1972)
- US Open: 2R (1970, 1972, 1976, 1977, 1978)

Michael "Mike" Machette (born January 27, 1951) is an American former professional tennis player. He was active on the international circuit during the 1970s. He enjoyed his highest level of success in doubles. He finished runner-up at three doubles events.

== Tennis career ==
Machette reached a career-high singles ranking of world No. 90 on January 3, 1977. His best singles performances at the Grand Slam level were second-round appearances at the US Open in 1972 and 1974, and at Wimbledon in 1973 and 1978.

In doubles, Machette achieved a career-high ranking of world No. 90 on January 2, 1978. His best Grand Slam run took place at the 1972 Wimbledon Championships, where he partnered with Mexican player Raúl Ramírez to reach the quarterfinals.

At the 1976 US Open, he played doubles with American James Delaney, and they defeated Americans Steve Turner and Steve Siegel in the first round. However, they lost to the Indian brothers Anand Amritraj and Anand Amritraj in the second round. In his career, Machette reached three doubles finals on the ATP Tour, finishing as the runner-up in all of them.

== Career finals ==
=== Doubles runners-up (3) ===
Result	W/L	Date	Tournament	Surface	Partner	Opponent	Score
Loss	0–1	Aug 1974	Merion, U.S.	Grass	(United States) Fred McNair	(United States) Roy Barth (Venezuela) Humphrey Hose	6–7, 2–6
Loss	0–2	Sep 1977	Los Angeles, U.S.	Hard	(United States) Tom Leonard	(United States) Sandy Mayer (South Africa) Frew McMillan	2–6, 3–6
Loss	0–3	Apr 1978	Houston WCT, U.S.	Clay	(United States) Tom Leonard	(Poland) Wojtek Fibak (Netherlands) Tom Okker	5–7, 5–7
