= Marcy O'Keefe =

American tennis player

- Full name: Marcy O'Keefe Deptuch
- Country (sports): United States
- Born: November 5, 1955 (age 69)
- Plays: Right-handed

Singles

Grand Slam singles results
- US Open: 2R (1973, 1976)

Doubles

Grand Slam doubles results
- US Open: 1R (1976)

Marcy O'Keefe Deptuch (born November 5, 1955) is an American former professional tennis player.

O'Keefe, who grew up in California, competed on tour in the 1970s. She twice made the second round of the US Open, including in 1976 when she won her opening match over Peggy Michel.

While attending Stanford University she played collegiate tennis and earned All-American honors in 1976.
