= Susan Mehmedbasich =

American tennis player

- Full name: Susan Mehmedbasich-Wright
- Country (sports): United States
- Born: September 16, 1957 (age 67)

Singles

Grand Slam singles results
- French Open: 1R (1976)
- Wimbledon: 1R (1976)
- US Open: 2R (1976)

Doubles

Grand Slam doubles results
- French Open: 2R (1976)
- Wimbledon: 3R (1976)
- US Open: 2R (1976)

Susan Mehmedbasich-Wright (born September 16, 1957) is an American former professional tennis player.

Mehmedbasich, raised in Northern California, competed briefly on tour after turning professional at the age of 17. Her career included a win over Wendy Turnbull and she made the women's doubles third round of the 1976 Wimbledon Championships.
