= Linda Rupert Thomas =

American tennis player

- Country (sports): United States
- Born: November 14, 1952 (age 73)

Singles

Grand Slam singles results
- French Open: 1R (1975)
- Wimbledon: 2R (1975)
- US Open: 1R (1976, 1977)

Doubles

Grand Slam doubles results
- Wimbledon: 2R (1976)
- US Open: 2R (1976, 1977)

Linda Rupert Thomas (born November 14, 1952) is an American former professional tennis player. She was a 2015 inductee into the Texas Tennis Hall of Fame.

Rupert, originally from Pennsylvania, has spent most of her life in the state of Texas, attending Lamar University from 1969 to 1973. She and partner Cathy Beene were the 1973 national collegiate doubles champions.

Graduating from Lamar University in 1973, Rupert spent the next several years on the professional tour. She featured twice in the singles main draw at the Wimbledon Championships, reaching the second round in 1975 and losing a first round match to Chris Evert in 1976.
