= Janice Metcalf =

American tennis player

- Full name: Janice Metcalf Cromer
- Country (sports): United States
- Born: July 10, 1952 (age 74)
- Retired: 1977
- College: University of Redlands

Singles
- Career titles: 1
- Highest ranking: No. 40

Grand Slam singles results
- French Open: 1R (1976)
- Wimbledon: 2R (1976)
- US Open: 3R (1973)

Grand Slam doubles results
- Wimbledon: 2R (1976)
- US Open: 2R (1976)

Grand Slam mixed doubles results
- US Open: 1R (1976)

Janice Metcalf Cromer (born July 10, 1952) is an American retired professional tennis player. She achieved a career-high world ranking in the top 40, and was ranked among the top 15 players in the United States.

Before turning professional, Metcalf attended the University of Redlands, where she became the first woman to play on the school's men's varsity tennis team. Her career was cut short in 1977 due to a persistent knee injury.

== Tennis career ==
Earning a degree from the University of Redlands, she was the first woman to compete on the university's men's tennis team, helping lead them to NAIA national championships in 1973 and 1974. During her amateur career, she won two national intercollegiate singles championships and three consecutive USTA Amateur Clay Court championships from 1971 to 1973.

Metcalf transitioned to the professional tour after graduating, climbing into the top 15 in the United States and reaching a career-high world ranking in the top 40.

In 1975 she won the singles title at the Torneo Godó in Barcelona defeating Iris Riedel of Germany in the final. At the 1976 US Open, she played mixed doubles with American Steve Turner, and they lost in the first round to Cynthia Doerner of Australia and John Feaver of Great Britain.

Due to a persistent knee injury, she retired from professional tennis in 1977 at 25 years of age. She was inducted into the ITA Women's Collegiate Tennis Hall of Fame in 2008.

== Career finals ==
=== Singles (1 title) ===
Result	W–L	Date	Tournament	Surface	Opponent	Score
Win	1–0	Oct 1975	Barcelona, Spain	Clay	(West Germany) Iris Riedel	4–6, 6–1, 6–4

=== Doubles (1 runner-up) ===
Result	W–L	Date	Tournament	Surface	Partner	Opponents	Score
Loss	0–1	Jul 1973	Cleveland, Ohio, U.S.	Clay	(United States) Laurie Tenney	(South Africa) Ilana Kloss (South Africa) Pat Pretorius	6–1, 6–7, 1–6
