= Kim Warwick =

Australian tennis player (born 1952)

- Country (sports): Australia
- Residence: Clearwater, Florida
- Born: 8 April 1952 (age 74) Sydney, Australia
- Height: 1.83 m (6 ft 0 in)
- Turned pro: 1970
- Retired: 1987 (brief comeback in 1996)
- Plays: Right-handed (one-handed backhand)
- Prize money: $994,045

Singles
- Career record: 268–253 (51.4%)
- Career titles: 3
- Highest ranking: No. 15 (12 October 1981)

Grand Slam singles results
- Australian Open: F (1980)
- French Open: 2R (1977, 1979, 1980)
- Wimbledon: 4R (1977)
- US Open: QF (1982)

Doubles
- Career record: 449–289 (60.8%)
- Career titles: 26
- Highest ranking: No. 10 (9 December 1985)

Grand Slam doubles results
- Australian Open: W (1978, 1980, 1981)
- French Open: W (1985)
- Wimbledon: QF (1977, 1982)
- US Open: SF (1977)

Grand Slam mixed doubles results
- French Open: W (1972, 1976)
- Wimbledon: F (1972)

Kim Warwick (born 8 April 1952) is an Australian former professional male tennis player who competed on the ATP Tour from 1970 to 1987, reaching the singles final of the Australian Open in 1980 by beating Guillermo Vilas in the semi finals. "I thought I'd shown him that unless he played his best tennis I would beat him" said Warwick afterwards. In the final, Warwick (who had been suffering from a shoulder injury throughout the event) was plagued by the injury and lost in straight sets to Brian Teacher. He defeated over 35 players ranked in the top ten including Guillermo Vilas, Raúl Ramírez, Vitas Gerulaitis, Jan Kodeš, Bob Lutz and Arthur Ashe. Warwick's career-high singles ranking was world No. 15, achieved in 1981. He won three singles titles and 26 doubles, including Australian Open 1978 (with Wojtek Fibak) and Australian Open 1980 and 1981, and Roland Garros 1985, and was also a runner-up in Australian Open 1986, all of them partnering fellow countryman Mark Edmondson. Partnering with Evonne Goolagong, he won the French Open 1972, defeating Françoise Dürr and Jean-Claude Barclay in the final. Evonne and Kim were finalists in 1972 at Wimbledon against Rosie Casals and Ilie Năstase who won.

Warwick also was a member of the winning team of World Team Tennis in 1975 (Pittsburgh Triangles) and 1986 (San Antonio Racquets). Warwick also holds the record for the most match points missed in a losing effort, having held eleven chances to defeat eventual champion Adriano Panatta in the Rome Masters in 1976.

His best record is his streak of 21 consecutive Grand Slam appearances; it began in 1975, and did not end until 1980. His record would later be surpassed by Ivan Lendl and Stefan Edberg, who would run it out to 54 consecutive Grand Slam appearances.

== Grand Slam finals ==
=== Singles: 1 (1 runner-up) ===
| Result | Year | Championship | Surface | Opponent | Score |
|---|---|---|---|---|---|
| Loss | 1980 | Australian Open | Grass | (United States) Brian Teacher | 5–7, 6–7^{(4–7)}, 3–6 |

=== Doubles: 4 (4 titles, 1 runner-up) ===
| Result | Year | Championship | Surface | Partner | Opponents | Score |
|---|---|---|---|---|---|---|
| Win | 1978 | Australian Open | Grass | (Poland) Wojciech Fibak | (Australia) Paul Kronk (Australia) Cliff Letcher | 7–6, 7–5 |
| Win | 1980 | Australian Open | Grass | (Australia) Mark Edmondson | (Australia) Peter McNamara (Australia) Paul McNamee | 7–5, 6–4 |
| Win | 1981 | Australian Open | Grass | (Australia) Mark Edmondson | (United States) Hank Pfister (United States) John Sadri | 6–3, 6–7, 6–3 |
| Win | 1985 | French Open | Clay | (Australia) Mark Edmondson | (Israel) Shlomo Glickstein (Sweden) Hans Simonsson | 6–3, 6–4, 6–7, 6–3 |
| Loss | 1985 | Australian Open | Grass | (Australia) Mark Edmondson | (United States) Paul Annacone (South Africa) Christo van Rensburg | 7–6, 4–6, 4–6 |

=== Mixed doubles: 3 (2 titles, 1 runner-up) ===
| Result | Year | Championship | Surface | Partner | Opponents | Score |
|---|---|---|---|---|---|---|
| Win | 1972 | French Open | Clay | (Australia) Evonne Goolagong | (France) Françoise Dürr (France) Jean-Claude Barclay | 6–2, 6–4 |
| Loss | 1972 | Wimbledon | Grass | (Australia) Evonne Goolagong | (United States) Rosemary Casals (Romania) Ilie Năstase | 4–6, 4–6 |
| Win | 1976 | French Open | Clay | (South Africa) Ilana Kloss | (South Africa) Linky Boshoff (United Kingdom) Colin Dowdeswell | 5–7, 7–6, 6–2 |

== Grand Slam performance timeline ==
Key
| W | F | SF | QF | #R | RR | Q# | P# | DNQ | A | Z# | PO | G | S | B | NMS | NTI | P | NH |

(W) winner; (F) finalist; (SF) semifinalist; (QF) quarterfinalist; (#R) rounds 4, 3, 2, 1; (RR) round-robin stage; (Q#) qualification round; (P#) preliminary round; (DNQ) did not qualify; (A) absent; (Z#) Davis/Fed Cup Zonal Group (with number indication) or (PO) play-off; (G) gold, (S) silver or (B) bronze Olympic/Paralympic medal; (NMS) not a Masters tournament; (NTI) not a Tier I tournament; (P) postponed; (NH) not held; (SR) strike rate (events won / competed); (W–L) win–loss record.

=== Singles ===
| Tournament | 1970 | 1971 | 1972 | 1973 | 1974 | 1975 | 1976 | 1977 | | 1978 | 1979 | 1980 | 1981 | 1982 | 1983 | 1984 | 1985 | 1986 | SR |
|---|---|---|---|---|---|---|---|---|---|---|---|---|---|---|---|---|---|---|---|
| Australian Open | A | A | 2R | 1R | 2R | QF | 3R | 1R | 1R | 3R | 3R | F | QF | A | 1R | 2R | A | A | 0 / 13 |
| French Open | A | A | P2 | 1R | A | A | 1R | 2R | | 1R | 2R | 2R | A | A | A | A | A | A | 0 / 6 |
| Wimbledon | Q2 | 1R | 1R | A | 3R | 3R | 3R | 4R | | 2R | 1R | 2R | A | 1R | A | Q3 | Q1 | Q2 | 0 / 10 |
| US Open | A | A | A | A | 1R | 2R | 3R | 1R | | 1R | 1R | A | A | QF | 3R | A | A | A | 0 / 8 |
| Strike rate | 0 / 0 | 0 / 1 | 0 / 2 | 0 / 2 | 0 / 3 | 0 / 3 | 0 / 4 | 0 / 5 | | 0 / 4 | 0 / 4 | 0 / 3 | 0 / 1 | 0 / 2 | 0 / 2 | 0 / 1 | 0 / 0 | 0 / 0 | 0 / 37 |

Note: The Australian Open was held twice in 1977, in January and December.

== Career finals ==
=== Singles: 11 (3 titles / 8 runners-up) ===
| Result | W-L | Date | Tournament | Surface | Opponent | Score |
|---|---|---|---|---|---|---|
| Loss | 0–1 | Jan 1972 | Adelaide, Australia | Grass | (Soviet Union) Alex Metreveli | 3–6, 3–6, 6–7 |
| Loss | 0–2 | Nov 1974 | Jakarta, Indonesia | Hard | (New Zealand) Onny Parun | 3–6, 3–6, 4–6 |
| Win | 1–2 | Nov 1976 | Bangalore, India | Clay | (India) Sashi Menon | 6–1, 6–2 |
| Loss | 1–3 | Nov 1977 | Tokyo, Japan | Clay | (Spain) Manuel Orantes | 2–6, 1–6 |
| Loss | 1–4 | Jul 1978 | Stuttgart, Germany | Clay | (West Germany) Ulrich Pinner | 2–6, 2–6, 6–7 |
| Loss | 1–5 | Dec 1978 | Sydney Outdoor, Australia | Grass | (United States) Tim Wilkison | 3–6, 3–6, 7–6^{(7–3)}, 6–3, 2–6 |
| Win | 2–5 | Dec 1979 | Adelaide, Australia | Grass | (South Africa) Bernard Mitton | 7–6^{(7–3)}, 6–4 |
| Loss | 2–6 | Jun 1980 | Queen's Club, UK | Grass | (United States) John McEnroe | 3–6, 1–6 |
| Loss | 2–7 | Jul 1980 | Gstaad, Switzerland | Clay | (Switzerland) Heinz Günthardt | 6–4, 4–6, 6–7^{(1–7)} |
| Win | 3–7 | Dec 1980 | Johannesburg, South Africa | Hard | (United States) Fritz Buehning | 6–2, 6–1, 6–2 |
| Loss | 3–8 | Dec 1980 | Australian Open, Melbourne | Grass | (United States) Brian Teacher | 5–7, 6–7^{(4–7)}, 3–6 |

Source: ATP

=== Doubles: 52 (26 titles / 26 runners-up) ===
| Result | W-L | Date | Tournament | Surface | Partner | Opponents | Score |
|---|---|---|---|---|---|---|---|
| Loss | 0–1 | Jan 1974 | Omaha, US | Other | (Australia) Ian Fletcher | (West Germany) Jürgen Fassbender (West Germany) Karl Meiler | 2–6, 4–6 |
| Loss | 0–2 | Mar 1974 | Tempe, US | Hard | (Australia) Ian Fletcher | (West Germany) Jürgen Fassbender (West Germany) Karl Meiler | 6–4, 4–6, 5–7 |
| Win | 1–2 | Sep 1974 | Cedar Grove, US | Other | (United States) Steve Siegel | (Australia) Dick Crealy (United States) Bob Tanis | 4–6, 6–2, 6–1 |
| Loss | 1–3 | Apr 1975 | Stockholm WCT, Sweden | Carpet (i) | (France) Patrice Dominguez | (United States) Arthur Ashe (Netherlands) Tom Okker | 3–6, 6–7 |
| Loss | 1–4 | Sep 1975 | San Francisco, US | Hard (i) | (Australia) Allan Stone | (United States) Fred McNair (United States) Sherwood Stewart | 2–6, 6–7 |
| Loss | 1–5 | Nov 1975 | Manila, Philippines | Hard | (Australia) Syd Ball | (Australia) Ross Case (Australia) Geoff Masters | 1–6, 2–6 |
| Loss | 1–6 | May 1976 | Hamburg, Germany | Clay | (Australia) Dick Crealy | (United States) Fred McNair (United States) Sherwood Stewart | 6–7, 6–7, 6–7 |
| Win | 2–6 | Oct 1976 | Brisbane, Australia | Grass | (Australia) Syd Ball | (Egypt) Ismail El Shafei (New Zealand) Brian Fairlie | 6–4, 6–4 |
| Loss | 2–7 | Oct 1976 | Sydney Indoor, Australia | Hard (i) | (Australia) Syd Ball | (Egypt) Ismail El Shafei (New Zealand) Brian Fairlie | 6–4, 4–6, 6–7 |
| Win | 3–7 | Jan 1977 | Sydney Outdoor, Australia | Grass | (Australia) Syd Ball | (Australia) Mark Edmondson (Australia) John Marks | 6–3, 6–4 |
| Loss | 3–8 | Jan 1977 | Adelaide, Australia | Grass | (Australia) Syd Ball | (Australia) Cliff Letcher (United States) Dick Stockton | 3–6, 6–4, 4–6 |
| Loss | 3–9 | Apr 1977 | Denver, US | Carpet (i) | (Australia) Syd Ball | (Australia) Colin Dibley (Australia) Geoff Masters | 2–6, 3–6 |
| Loss | 3–10 | May 1977 | Hamburg, Germany | Clay | (Australia) Phil Dent | (South Africa) Bob Hewitt (West Germany) Karl Meiler | 6–3, 3–6, 4–6, 4–6 |
| Win | 4–10 | Nov 1977 | Tokyo Outdoor, Japan | Clay | (Australia) Geoff Masters | (Australia) Colin Dibley (Australia) Chris Kachel | 6–2, 7–6 |
| Win | 5–10 | Nov 1977 | Hong Kong, UK | Hard | (Australia) Syd Ball | (United States) Marty Riessen (United States) Roscoe Tanner | 7–6, 6–3 |
| Win | 6–10 | Dec 1977 | Adelaide, Australia | Grass | (Australia) Syd Ball | (Australia) John Alexander (Australia) Phil Dent | 3–6, 7–6, 6–4 |
| Loss | 6–11 | Jul 1978 | Gstaad, Switzerland | Clay | (South Africa) Bob Hewitt | (Australia) Mark Edmondson (Netherlands) Tom Okker | 4–6, 6–1, 1–6, 4–6 |
| Loss | 6–12 | Aug 1978 | Stowe, US | Hard | (Australia) Mark Edmondson | (United States) Tim Gullikson (United States) Tom Gullikson | 6–3, 6–7, 3–6 |
| Win | 7–12 | Jan 1978 | Australian Open, Melbourne | Grass | (Poland) Wojciech Fibak | (Australia) Paul Kronk (Australia) Cliff Letcher | 7–6, 7–5 |
| Win | 8–12 | Jan 1979 | Auckland, New Zealand | Hard | (South Africa) Bernard Mitton | (United Kingdom) Andrew Jarrett (United Kingdom) Jonathan Smith | 6–3, 2–6, 6–3 |
| Loss | 8–13 | Mar 1980 | Metz, France | Carpet (i) | (United States) Chris Delaney | (Australia) Colin Dibley (United States) Gene Mayer | 6–7, 5–7 |
| Win | 9–13 | Mar 1980 | Nice, France | Clay | (United States) Chris Delaney | (Czechoslovakia) Stanislav Birner (Czechoslovakia) Jiří Hřebec | 6–4, 6–0 |
| Win | 10–13 | May 1980 | Rome, Italy | Clay | (Australia) Mark Edmondson | (Hungary) Balázs Taróczy (United States) Eliot Teltscher | 7–6, 7–6 |
| Win | 11–13 | Jun 1980 | Surbiton, UK | Grass | (Australia) Mark Edmondson | (Rhodesia) Andrew Pattison (United States) Butch Walts | 7–6, 6–7, 6–7, 7–6, 15–13 |
| Loss | 11–14 | Jul 1980 | Gstaad, Switzerland | Clay | (Australia) Mark Edmondson | (United Kingdom) Colin Dowdeswell (Egypt) Ismail El Shafei | 4–6, 4–6 |
| Win | 12–14 | Jan 1981 | Australian Open, Melbourne | Grass | (Australia) Mark Edmondson | (Australia) Peter McNamara (Australia) Paul McNamee | 7–5, 6–4 |
| Win | 13–14 | Jan 1982 | Australian Open, Melbourne | Grass | (Australia) Mark Edmondson | (United States) Hank Pfister (United States) John Sadri | 6–3, 6–7, 6–3 |
| Win | 14–14 | Jan 1982 | Adelaide, Australia | Grass | (Australia) Mark Edmondson | (United Kingdom) Andrew Jarrett (United Kingdom) Jonathan Smith | 7–5, 4–6, 7–6 |
| Win | 15–14 | Jan 1982 | Guarujá, Brazil | Clay | (Australia) Phil Dent | (Brazil) Carlos Kirmayr (Brazil) Cássio Motta | 6–7, 6–2, 6–3 |
| Loss | 15–15 | Feb 1982 | Denver, US | Carpet (i) | (Australia) Phil Dent | (South Africa) Kevin Curren (United States) Steve Denton | 4–6, 4–6 |
| Win | 16–15 | Feb 1982 | Richmond WCT, US | Carpet | (Australia) Mark Edmondson | (Australia) Syd Ball (West Germany) Rolf Gehring | 6–4, 6–2 |
| Loss | 16–16 | Jun 1982 | Bristol, UK | Grass | (Australia) Mark Edmondson | (United States) Tim Gullikson (United States) Tom Gullikson | 4–6, 6–7 |
| Win | 17–16 | Jul 1982 | Kitzbühel, Austria | Clay | (Australia) Mark Edmondson | (Australia) Rod Frawley (Czechoslovakia) Pavel Složil | 6–4, 4–6, 7–6 |
| Loss | 17–17 | Sep 1982 | Sawgrass Doubles, US | Clay | (Australia) Mark Edmondson | (United States) Brian Gottfried (Mexico) Raúl Ramírez | w/o |
| Loss | 17–18 | Nov 1982 | Hong Kong | Hard | (United States) Van Winitsky | (United States) Charles Strode (United States) Morris Strode | 4–6, 6–3, 2–6 |
| Win | 18–18 | Aug 1983 | Stowe, US | Hard | (Australia) Brad Drewett | (United States) Fritz Buehning (United States) Tom Gullikson | 4–6, 7–5, 6–2 |
| Loss | 18–19 | Oct 1983 | Brisbane, Australia | Carpet (i) | (Australia) Mark Edmondson | (Australia) Pat Cash (Australia) Paul McNamee | 6–7, 6–7 |
| Win | 19–19 | Nov 1983 | Taipei, Taiwan | Carpet (i) | (Australia) Wally Masur | (United States) Ken Flach (United States) Robert Seguso | 7–6, 6–4 |
| Loss | 19–20 | Aug 1984 | Toronto, Canada | Hard | (Australia) John Fitzgerald | (United States) Peter Fleming (United States) John McEnroe | 4–6, 2–6 |
| Loss | 19–21 | Feb 1985 | Delray Beach, US | Hard | (United States) Sherwood Stewart | (United States) Paul Annacone (South Africa) Christo van Rensburg | 5–7, 5–7, 4–6 |
| Win | 20–21 | May 1985 | Munich, Germany | Clay | (Australia) Mark Edmondson | (Spain) Sergio Casal (Spain) Emilio Sánchez | 4–6, 7–5, 7–5 |
| Win | 21–21 | Jun 1985 | French Open, Paris | Clay | (Australia) Mark Edmondson | (Israel) Shlomo Glickstein (Sweden) Hans Simonsson | 6–3, 6–4, 6–7, 6–3 |
| Loss | 21–22 | Jul 1985 | Indianapolis, US | Clay | (Czechoslovakia) Pavel Složil | (United States) Ken Flach (United States) Robert Seguso | 4–6, 4–6 |
| Loss | 21–23 | Oct 1985 | Sydney Indoor, Australia | Hard (i) | (Australia) Mark Edmondson | (Australia) John Fitzgerald (Sweden) Anders Järryd | 3–6, 2–6 |
| Win | 22–23 | Nov 1985 | Hong Kong, UK | Hard | (Australia) Brad Drewett | (Switzerland) Jakob Hlasek (Czechoslovakia) Tomáš Šmíd | 6–3, 4–6, 6–2 |
| Loss | 22–24 | Dec 1985 | Australian Open, Melbourne | Grass | (Australia) Mark Edmondson | (United States) Paul Annacone (South Africa) Christo van Rensburg | 7–6, 4–6, 4–6 |
| Win | 23–24 | Dec 1985 | Adelaide, Australia | Grass | (Australia) Mark Edmondson | (Brazil) Nelson Aerts (United States) Tomm Warneke | 6–4, 6–4 |
| Win | 24–24 | Aug 1986 | Cincinnati, US | Hard | (Australia) Mark Kratzmann | (South Africa) Christo Steyn (South Africa) Danie Visser | 6–3, 6–4 |
| Win | 25–24 | Nov 1986 | Stockholm, Sweden | Hard (i) | (United States) Sherwood Stewart | (Australia) Pat Cash (Socialist Federal Republic of Yugoslavia) Slobodan Živojinović | 6–4, 6–4 |
| Loss | 25–25 | Nov 1986 | Wembley, UK | Carpet (i) | (United States) Sherwood Stewart | (United States) Peter Fleming (United States) John McEnroe | 6–3, 6–7, 2–6 |
| Win | 26–25 | Mar 1987 | Orlando, US | Hard | (United States) Sherwood Stewart | (United States) Paul Annacone (South Africa) Christo van Rensburg | 2–6, 7–6, 6–4 |
| Loss | 26–26 | Mar 1988 | Orlando, US | Hard | (United States) Sherwood Stewart | (France) Guy Forget (France) Yannick Noah | 4–6, 4–6 |

Source: ATP
