= 1976 US Open (tennis) =

- Date: September 1–12
- Edition: 96th
- Category: Grand Slam (ITF)
- Surface: Clay (Har-Tru)
- Location: Forest Hills, Queens, United States
- Venue: West Side Tennis Club

Champions

Men's singles
- (United States) Jimmy Connors

Women's singles
- (United States) Chris Evert

Men's doubles
- (Netherlands) Tom Okker / (United States) Marty Riessen

Women's doubles
- (South Africa) Delina Boshoff / (South Africa) Ilana Kloss

Mixed doubles
- (United States) Billie Jean King / (Australia) Phil Dent
- US Open

The 1976 US Open was a tennis tournament that took place on the outdoor Har-Tru clay courts at the West Side Tennis Club in Forest Hills, Queens, in New York City, New York. The tournament was held from September 1 until September 12, 1976. It was the 96th staging of the US Open, and the fourth Grand Slam tennis event of 1976. It was the second year in which this tournament was played on clay courts. Jimmy Connors and Chris Evert won the singles titles.

== Seniors ==
=== Men's singles ===
(United States) Jimmy Connors defeated (Sweden) Björn Borg, 6–4, 3–6, 7–6^{(11-9)}, 6–4

- It was Connors's 4th career Grand Slam title, and his 2nd US Open title.

=== Women's singles ===
(United States) Chris Evert defeated (Australia) Evonne Goolagong Cawley 6–3, 6–0

- It was Evert's 6th career Grand Slam title, and her 2nd (consecutive) US Open title.

=== Men's doubles ===
(Netherlands) Tom Okker / (United States) Marty Riessen defeated (Australia) Paul Kronk / (Australia) Cliff Letcher 6–4, 6–4

=== Women's doubles ===
(South Africa) Delina Boshoff / (South Africa) Ilana Kloss defeated (Soviet Union) Olga Morozova / (United Kingdom) Virginia Wade 6–1, 6–4

=== Mixed doubles ===
(United States) Billie Jean King / (Australia) Phil Dent defeated (Netherlands) Betty Stöve / (South Africa) Frew McMillan 3–6, 6–2, 7–5

== Juniors ==
=== Boys' singles ===
(Ecuador) Ricardo Ycaza defeated (Argentina) José Luis Clerc 6–4, 5–7, 6–0

=== Girls' singles ===
(South Africa) Marise Kruger defeated (Romania) Lucia Romanov 6–3, 7–5

== Prize money ==
| Event | | W | F | SF | QF | 4R | 3R | 2R | 1R |
| Singles | Men | $30,000 | $15,000 | $7,500 | $3,500 | $2,200 | $1,225 | $700 | $425 |
| Singles | Women | $30,000 | $15,000 | $7,500 | $3,500 | - | $2,200 | $1,225 | $700 |

| Preceded by 1976 Wimbledon Championships | Grand Slams | Succeeded by 1977 Australian Open |
