= Linky Boshoff =

South African tennis player

Delina Boshoff
- Full name: Delina Ann Boshoff–Mortlock
- Country (sports): 🇿🇦 South Africa
- Residence: South Africa
- Born: 12 November 1956 (age 69) Queenstown, Eastern Cape, South Africa
- Turned pro: 1973
- Retired: 1978
- Plays: Right-handed

Singles
- Career record: no value

Grand Slam singles results
- French Open: QF (1977)
- Wimbledon: QF (1974)
- US Open: 3R (1975)

Doubles
- Career record: no value
- Highest ranking: No. 1 (1976)

Grand Slam doubles results
- French Open: SF (1976)
- Wimbledon: SF (1976)
- US Open: W (1976)

Grand Slam mixed doubles results
- French Open: F (1976)
- Wimbledon: 4R (1973, 1974)

Delina Ann Boshoff-Mortlock, commonly known as Linky Boshoff (born 12 November 1956), is a South African former professional tennis player. She won the 1976 US Open women's doubles title with her partner Ilana Kloss.

== Tennis career ==
In 1973 Boshoff won the South African Open doubles title with Ilana Kloss after a victory in the final against Chris Evert and Virginia Wade. In 1977, she won the singles title, defeating Brigitte Cuypers in the final in straight sets.

In December 1975, Boshoff was the first selection in the 1976 World Team Tennis Draft by the San Diego Friars; however, she didn't sign with the team.

In 1976, she won several doubles titles with Kloss, including the German Open, Italian Open and U.S. Clay Court Championships and reached the world No. 1 ranking in doubles.

She retired in 1978 to study computer science at the University of Port Elizabeth. She is married with three children and has continued to play the tennis at a recreational level.

== In popular culture ==
In Snoopy's Tennis Book (Charles Schulz, Henry Holt & Co., 1979), Snoopy imagines himself playing at Wimbledon and claims he had a "good day" at the tournament: "I ate five bowls of strawberries and cream, and fell in love with Linky Boshoff!"

== Grand Slam finals ==
=== Doubles (1 title) ===
| Result | Year | Championship | Surface | Partner | Opponents | Score |
|---|---|---|---|---|---|---|
| Win | 1976 | US Open | Clay | (South Africa) Ilana Kloss | (Soviet Union) Olga Morozova (United Kingdom) Virginia Wade | 6–1, 6–4 |

=== Mixed doubles (1 runner-up) ===
| Result | Year | Championship | Surface | Partner | Opponents | Score |
|---|---|---|---|---|---|---|
| Loss | 1976 | French Open | Clay | (Rhodesia) Colin Dowdeswell | (South Africa) Ilana Kloss (Australia) Kim Warwick | 7–5, 5–7, 2–6 |
