= 1973 Federation Cup (tennis) =

International women's tennis competition

Details
- Duration: 30 April – 6 May
- Edition: 11th

Champion
- Winning nation: Australia

The 1973 Federation Cup was the 11th edition of the most important competition between national teams in women's tennis. 30 nations participated in the tournament, which was held at the Bad Homburg Tennis Club in Bad Homburg, West Germany from 30 April–6 May. Australia defeated South Africa in the final, winning the title without losing a rubber.

== Participating teams ==
Participating teams
Argentina	Australia	Austria	Belgium	Brazil	Canada
Chile	Denmark	France	Great Britain	Greece	Indonesia
Ireland	Italy	Japan	Luxembourg	Mexico	Netherlands
New Zealand	Norway	Poland	Romania	South Africa	South Korea
Spain	Sweden	Switzerland	United States	West Germany	Yugoslavia

== Draw ==
All ties were played at the Bad Homburg Tennis Club in Bad Homburg, West Germany on clay courts.

First Round; 30 April–1 May
Japan	3
Ireland	0
Luxembourg
Poland	w/o
New Zealand	1
Indonesia	2
United States	3
Italy	0
Norway	0
South Korea	3
Spain	2
Canada	0
Chile	w/o
West Germany
South Africa	3
Greece	0
Switzerland	0
Belgium	3
Denmark	2
Yugoslavia	1
Netherlands	2
France	1
Sweden	3
Argentina	0
Romania	3
Brazil	0
Austria	0
Mexico	3

Second Round; 2–3 May
Australia	2
Japan	0
Luxembourg	0
Indonesia	3
United States	2
South Korea	1
Spain	0
West Germany	3
South Africa	3
Belgium	0
Denmark	0
Netherlands	2
Sweden	1
Romania	2
Mexico	0
Great Britain	3

Quarterfinals; 4 May
Australia	3
Indonesia	0
United States	0
West Germany	3
South Africa	3
Netherlands	0
Romania	2
Great Britain	1

Semifinals; 5 May
Australia	3
West Germany	0
South Africa	2
Romania	1

Final; 6 May
Australia	3
South Africa	0

=== First round ===
Japan vs. Ireland

Japan
3
Bad Homburg Tennis Club, Bad Homburg, West Germany
30 April 1973
Clay

Ireland
0

			1	2	3
1	(Japan) (Republic of Ireland)	Kazuko Sawamatsu; Geraldine Barniville	6; 4	6; 1
2	(Japan) (Republic of Ireland)	Hideko Goto; Susan Minford	7; 5	6; 1
3	(Japan) (Republic of Ireland)	Kazuko Sawamatsu / Kimiyo Hatanaka; Geraldine Barniville / Susan Minford	6; 1	6; 2

New Zealand vs. Indonesia

New Zealand
1
Bad Homburg Tennis Club, Bad Homburg, West Germany
30 April 1973
Clay

Indonesia
2

			1	2	3
1	(New Zealand) (Indonesia)	Marilyn Pryde; Lany Kaligis	4; 6	3; 6
2	(New Zealand) (Indonesia)	Judy Connor; Lita Sugiarto	2; 6	4; 6
3	(New Zealand) (Indonesia)	Judy Connor / Marilyn Pryde; Lany Kaligis / Lita Sugiarto	6; 3	10; 8

United States vs. Italy

United States
3
Bad Homburg Tennis Club, Bad Homburg, West Germany
30 April 1973
Clay

Italy
0

			1	2	3
1	(United States) (Italy)	Patti Hogan; Lucia Bassi	6; 4	6; 0
2	(United States) (Italy)	Linda Tuero; Anna-Maria Nasuelli	6; 2	6; 1
3	(United States) (Italy)	Patti Hogan / Sharon Walsh; Lucia Bassi / Daniela Marzano	6; 3	3; 6	6; 2

Norway vs. South Korea

Norway
0
Bad Homburg Tennis Club, Bad Homburg, West Germany
30 April 1973
Clay

South Korea
3

			1	2	3
1	(Norway) (South Korea)	Ellen Grindvold; Yang Jeong-soon	3; 6	5; 7
2	(Norway) (South Korea)	Liv Hubert; Lee Mi-ok	4; 6	0; 6
3	(Norway) (South Korea)	Ellen Grindvold / Liv Hubert; Lee Mi-ok / Yang Jeong-soon	1; 6	6; 3	3; 6

Spain vs. Canada

Spain
2
Bad Homburg Tennis Club, Bad Homburg, West Germany
30 April 1973
Clay

Canada
0

			1	2	3
1	(Spain) (Canada)	Carmen Mandarino; Janice Tindle	6; 4	4; 6	6; 4
2	(Spain) (Canada)	Carmen Perea; Andrée Martin	3; 6	7; 5	6; 4
3	(Spain) (Canada)					not played

South Africa vs. Greece

South Africa
3
Bad Homburg Tennis Club, Bad Homburg, West Germany
1 May 1973
Clay

Greece
0

			1	2	3
1	(South Africa) (Greece)	Patricia Walkden; Carol-Ann Kalogeropoulos	6; 2	6; 2
2	(South Africa) (Greece)	Brenda Kirk; Alice Alexandri	6; 0	6; 0
3	(South Africa) (Greece)	Brenda Kirk / Patricia Walkden; Carol-Ann Kalogeropoulos / Dionissia Kotsia	6; 0	6; 0

Switzerland vs. Belgium

Switzerland
0
Bad Homburg Tennis Club, Bad Homburg, West Germany
1 May 1973
Clay

Belgium
3

			1	2	3
1	(Switzerland) (Belgium)	Evagreth Emmenegger; Michèle Gurdal	6; 0	1; 6	2; 6
2	(Switzerland) (Belgium)	Marianne Kindler; Monique Van Haver	0; 6	4; 6
3	(Switzerland) (Belgium)	Evagreth Emmenegger / Ingrid Sadlon; Michèle Gurdal / Monique Van Haver	2; 6	3; 6

Denmark vs. Yugoslavia

Denmark
2
Bad Homburg Tennis Club, Bad Homburg, West Germany
1 May 1973
Clay

Yugoslavia
1

			1	2	3
1	(Denmark) (Socialist Federal Republic of Yugoslavia)	Anne-Mette Sørensen; Mima Jaušovec	0; 6	5; 7
2	(Denmark) (Socialist Federal Republic of Yugoslavia)	Mari-Ann Klougart; Jelena Genčić	6; 3	6; 2
3	(Denmark) (Socialist Federal Republic of Yugoslavia)	Dorte Ekner / Anne-Mette Sørensen; Jelena Genčić / Mima Jaušovec	6; 0	2; 6	7; 5

Netherlands vs. France

Netherlands
2
Bad Homburg Tennis Club, Bad Homburg, West Germany
1 May 1973
Clay

France
1

			1	2	3
1	(Netherlands) (France)	Marijke Schaar; Nathalie Fuchs	6; 3	6; 3
2	(Netherlands) (France)	Gertruida Walhof; Odile de Roubin	2; 6	4; 6
3	(Netherlands) (France)	Marijke Schaar / Gertruida Walhof; Odile de Roubin / Florence Guédy	2; 6	6; 0	6; 2

Sweden vs. Argentina

Sweden
3
Bad Homburg Tennis Club, Bad Homburg, West Germany
1 May 1973
Clay

Argentina
0

			1	2	3
1	(Sweden) (Argentina)	Ingrid Bentzer; Raquel Giscafré	6; 1	6; 1
2	(Sweden) (Argentina)	Christina Sandberg; Inés Roget	6; 3	6; 3
3	(Sweden) (Argentina)	Ingrid Bentzer / Christina Sandberg; Inés Roget / Elvira Weisenberger	7; 5	6; 3

Romania vs. Brazil

Romania
3
Bad Homburg Tennis Club, Bad Homburg, West Germany
1 May 1973
Clay

Brazil
0

			1	2	3
1	(Romania) (Brazil)	Judith Gohn; Andrea Menezes	6; 0	6; 0
2	(Romania) (Brazil)	Virginia Ruzici; Suzana Gesteira	6; 1	6; 2
3	(Romania) (Brazil)	Judith Gohn / Mariana Simionescu; Suzana Gesteira / Andrea Menezes	6; 1	6; 2

Mexico vs. Austria

Austria
0
Bad Homburg Tennis Club, Bad Homburg, West Germany
1 May 1973
Clay

Mexico
3

			1	2	3
1	(Austria) (Mexico)	Sonja Pachta; Elena Subirats	3; 6	1; 6
2	(Austria) (Mexico)	Veronika Buche; Gina Díaz Ponce	7; 5	2; 6	5; 7
3	(Austria) (Mexico)	Sabine Bernegger / Veronika Buche; María-Teresa Salvidea Díaz / Elena Subirats	5; 7	3; 6

=== Second round ===
Australia vs. Japan

Australia
2
Bad Homburg Tennis Club, Bad Homburg, West Germany
2 May 1973
Clay

Japan
0

			1	2	3
1	(Australia) (Japan)	Evonne Goolagong; Kazuko Sawamatsu	6; 2	6; 0
2	(Australia) (Japan)	Patricia Coleman; Hideko Goto	6; 0	6; 1
3	(Australia) (Japan)	Evonne Goolagong / Janet Young; Hideko Goto / Kazuko Sawamatsu	4; 1			not completed

Luxembourg vs. Indonesia

Luxembourg
0
Bad Homburg Tennis Club, Bad Homburg, West Germany
2 May 1973
Clay

Indonesia
3

			1	2	3
1	(Luxembourg) (Indonesia)	Flore Wagner; Lany Kaligis	2; 6	2; 6
2	(Luxembourg) (Indonesia)	Monique Hendel; Lita Sugiarto	0; 6	0; 6
3	(Luxembourg) (Indonesia)	Josiane Graas / Flore Wagner; Lany Kaligis / Lita Sugiarto	0; 6	1; 6

United States vs. South Korea

United States
2
Bad Homburg Tennis Club, Bad Homburg, West Germany
2 May 1973
Clay

South Korea
1

			1	2	3
1	(United States) (South Korea)	Patti Hogan; Yang Jeong-soon	3; 6	4; 6
2	(United States) (South Korea)	Linda Tuero; Lee Mi-ok	6; 1	7; 5
3	(United States) (South Korea)	Patti Hogan / Sharon Walsh; Lee Mi-ok / Yang Jeong-soon	6; 1	6; 0

Spain vs. West Germany

Spain
0
Bad Homburg Tennis Club, Bad Homburg, West Germany
2 May 1973
Clay

West Germany
3

			1	2	3
1	(Spain) (West Germany)	Carmen Mandarino; Helga Masthoff	1; 6	0; 6
2	(Spain) (West Germany)	Carmen Perea; Katja Ebbinghaus	8; 6	0; 6	2; 6
3	(Spain) (West Germany)	Ana María Estalella Manso / Carmen Mandarino; Helga Masthoff / Heide Schildknecht	3; 6	4; 6

South Africa vs. Belgium

South Africa
3
Bad Homburg Tennis Club, Bad Homburg, West Germany
2 May 1973
Clay

Belgium
0

			1	2	3
1	(South Africa) (Belgium)	Patricia Walkden; Michèle Gurdal	6; 4	6; 3
2	(South Africa) (Belgium)	Brenda Kirk; Monique Van Haver	6; 2	3; 6	6; 3
3	(South Africa) (Belgium)	Brenda Kirk / Patricia Walkden; Michèle Gurdal / Monique Van Haver	6; 1	6; 4

Denmark vs. Netherlands

Denmark
0
Bad Homburg Tennis Club, Bad Homburg, West Germany
2 May 1973
Clay

Netherlands
2

			1	2	3
1	(Denmark) (Netherlands)	Anne-Mette Sørensen; Marijke Schaar	0; 6	1; 6
2	(Denmark) (Netherlands)	Mari-Ann Klougart; Gertruida Walhof	0; 6	2; 6
3	(Denmark) (Netherlands)					not played

Sweden vs. Romania

Sweden
1
Bad Homburg Tennis Club, Bad Homburg, West Germany
3 May 1973
Clay

Romania
2

			1	2	3
1	(Sweden) (Romania)	Ingrid Bentzer; Judith Gohn	6; 3	3; 6	6; 3
2	(Sweden) (Romania)	Christina Sandberg; Virginia Ruzici	3; 6	6; 8
3	(Sweden) (Romania)	Ingrid Bentzer / Mimmi Wikstedt; Judith Gohn / Mariana Simionescu	4; 6	6; 2	5; 7

Mexico vs. Great Britain

Mexico
0
Bad Homburg Tennis Club, Bad Homburg, West Germany
3 May 1973
Clay

Great Britain
3

			1	2	3
1	(Mexico) (United Kingdom)	Elena Subirats; Virginia Wade	5; 7	5; 7
2	(Mexico) (United Kingdom)	Gina Díaz Ponce; Joyce Williams	4; 6	6; 3	1; 6
3	(Mexico) (United Kingdom)	Gina Díaz Ponce / Elena Subirats; Virginia Wade / Joyce Williams	5; 7	7; 9

=== Quarterfinals ===
Australia vs. Indonesia

Australia
3
Bad Homburg Tennis Club, Bad Homburg, West Germany
4 May 1973
Clay

Indonesia
0

			1	2	3
1	(Australia) (Indonesia)	Evonne Goolagong; Lany Kaligis	6; 0	5; 7	6; 1
2	(Australia) (Indonesia)	Patricia Coleman; Lita Sugiarto	6; 4	6; 2
3	(Australia) (Indonesia)	Evonne Goolagong / Janet Young; Lany Kaligis / Lita Sugiarto	6; 1	6; 0

United States vs. West Germany

United States
0
Bad Homburg Tennis Club, Bad Homburg, West Germany
4 May 1973
Clay

West Germany
3

			1	2	3
1	(United States) (West Germany)	Linda Tuero; Helga Masthoff	2; 6	5; 7
2	(United States) (West Germany)	Patti Hogan; Katja Ebbinghaus	4; 6	1; 6
3	(United States) (West Germany)	Janice Metcalf / Sharon Walsh; Helga Masthoff / Heide Schildknecht	4; 6	2; 6

South Africa vs. Netherlands

South Africa
3
Bad Homburg Tennis Club, Bad Homburg, West Germany
4 May 1973
Clay

Netherlands
0

			1	2	3
1	(South Africa) (Netherlands)	Patricia Walkden; Marijke Schaar	6; 3	6; 3
2	(South Africa) (Netherlands)	Brenda Kirk; Gertruida Walhof	6; 1	2; 6	6; 3
3	(South Africa) (Netherlands)	Ilana Kloss / Patricia Walkden; Gertruida Walhof / Tine Zwaan	6; 4	6; 0

Romania vs. Great Britain

Romania
2
Bad Homburg Tennis Club, Bad Homburg, West Germany
4 May 1973
Clay

Great Britain
1

			1	2	3
1	(Romania) (United Kingdom)	Judith Gohn; Virginia Wade	2; 6	3; 6
2	(Romania) (United Kingdom)	Mariana Simionescu; Joyce Williams	6; 3	6; 8	6; 3
3	(Romania) (United Kingdom)	Judith Gohn / Virginia Ruzici; Virginia Wade / Joyce Williams	7; 5	6; 2

=== Semifinals ===
Australia vs. West Germany

Australia
3
Bad Homburg Tennis Club, Bad Homburg, West Germany
5 May 1973
Clay

West Germany
0

			1	2	3
1	(Australia) (West Germany)	Evonne Goolagong; Helga Masthoff	6; 4	6; 3
2	(Australia) (West Germany)	Patricia Coleman; Katja Ebbinghaus	6; 3	6; 2
3	(Australia) (West Germany)	Evonne Goolagong / Janet Young; Helga Masthoff / Heide Schildknecht	6; 4	4; 6	6; 1

South Africa vs. Romania

South Africa
2
Bad Homburg Tennis Club, Bad Homburg, West Germany
5 May 1973
Clay

Romania
1

			1	2	3
1	(South Africa) (Romania)	Patricia Walkden; Judith Gohn	6; 4	6; 1
2	(South Africa) (Romania)	Brenda Kirk; Virginia Ruzici	6; 4	3; 6	3; 6
3	(South Africa) (Romania)	Brenda Kirk / Patricia Walkden; Judith Gohn / Mariana Simionescu	6; 2	4; 6	6; 3

=== Final ===
Australia vs. South Africa

Australia
3
Bad Homburg Tennis Club, Bad Homburg, West Germany
6 May 1973
Clay

South Africa
0

			1	2	3
1	(Australia) (South Africa)	Evonne Goolagong; Patricia Walkden	6; 0	6; 2
2	(Australia) (South Africa)	Patricia Coleman; Brenda Kirk	10; 8	6; 0
3	(Australia) (South Africa)	Evonne Goolagong / Janet Young; Brenda Kirk / Patricia Walkden	6; 1	6; 2

== Consolation Round ==
Teams which lost in the first or second round of the main draw went on to play in the Consolation Round.

=== Draw ===
Consolation first round 3 May
Belgium	2
New Zealand	1
South Korea	3
Switzerland	0
France	3
Denmark	0
Brazil	3
Luxembourg	0

Consolation second round 3 May
Sweden	3
Canada	0
Mexico	w/o
Norway
Spain	2
Italy	1
Belgium	0
South Korea	2
France	2
Brazil	0
Greece	0
Ireland	3
Austria	2
Yugoslavia	1
Argentina	0
Japan	2

Consolation Quarterfinals; 4 May
Sweden	2
Norway	1
Spain	1
South Korea	2
France	2
Ireland	0
Austria	0
Japan	3

Consolation Semifinals; 5 May
Sweden	2
South Korea	1
France	1
Japan	2

Consolation final 6 May
Sweden	'2
Japan	1

=== First round ===
Belgium vs. New Zealand

Belgium
2
Bad Homburg Tennis Club, Bad Homburg, West Germany
3 May 1973
Clay

New Zealand
1

		1	2	3
1	(Belgium) (New Zealand)
2	(Belgium) (New Zealand)
3	(Belgium) (New Zealand)

South Korea vs. Switzerland

South Korea
3
Bad Homburg Tennis Club, Bad Homburg, West Germany
3 May 1973
Clay

Switzerland
0

			1	2	3
1	(South Korea) (Switzerland)	Yang Jeong-soon; Evagreth Emmenegger	6; 3	7; 5
2	(South Korea) (Switzerland)	Lee Duk-hee; Ingrid Sadlon	6; 4	6; 0
3	(South Korea) (Switzerland)	Lee Duk-hee / Lee Soon-oh; Marianne Kindler / Ingrid Sadlon	6; 3	6; 3

France vs. Denmark

France
3
Bad Homburg Tennis Club, Bad Homburg, West Germany
3 May 1973
Clay

Denmark
0

			1	2	3
1	(France) (Denmark)	Odile de Roubin; Anne-Mette Sørensen	6; 3	6; 4
2	(France) (Denmark)	Florence Guédy; Mari-Ann Klougart	6; 1	6; 1
3	(France) (Denmark)	Odile de Roubin / Florence Guédy; Dorte Ekner / Mari-Ann Klougart	7; 5	6; 1

Luxembourg vs. Brazil

Brazil
3
Bad Homburg Tennis Club, Bad Homburg, West Germany
3 May 1973
Clay

Luxembourg
0

		1	2	3
1	(Brazil) (Luxembourg)
2	(Brazil) (Luxembourg)
3	(Brazil) (Luxembourg)

=== Second round ===
Sweden vs. Canada

Sweden
3
Bad Homburg Tennis Club, Bad Homburg, West Germany
3 May 1973
Clay

Canada
0

			1	2	3
1	(Sweden) (Canada)	Ingrid Bentzer; Janice Tindle	6; 2	6; 2
2	(Sweden) (Canada)	Christina Sandberg; Andrée Martin	6; 3	6; 3
3	(Sweden) (Canada)	Ingrid Bentzer / Mimmi Wikstedt; Andrée Martin / Janice Tindle	6; 0	7; 5

Spain vs. Italy

Spain
2
Bad Homburg Tennis Club, Bad Homburg, West Germany
3 May 1973
Clay

Italy
1

		1	2	3
1	(Spain) (Italy)
2	(Spain) (Italy)
3	(Spain) (Italy)

Belgium vs. South Korea

Belgium
0
Bad Homburg Tennis Club, Bad Homburg, West Germany
3 May 1973
Clay

South Korea
2

			1	2	3
1	(Belgium) (South Korea)	Michèle Gurdal; Yang Jeong-soon	6; 3	6; 8	4; 6
2	(Belgium) (South Korea)	Monique Van Haver; Lee Duk-hee	2; 6	6; 4	2; 6
3	(Belgium) (South Korea)					not played

France vs. Brazil

France
2
Bad Homburg Tennis Club, Bad Homburg, West Germany
3 May 1973
Clay

Brazil
0

			1	2	3
1	(France) (Brazil)	Florence Guédy; Suzana Gesteira	9; 11	6; 3	8; 6
2	(France) (Brazil)	Odile de Roubin; Andrea Menezes	6; 1	2; 6	6; 1
3	(France) (Brazil)					not played

Greece vs. Ireland

Greece
0
Bad Homburg Tennis Club, Bad Homburg, West Germany
3 May 1973
Clay

Ireland
3

		1	2	3
1	(Greece) (Republic of Ireland)
2	(Greece) (Republic of Ireland)
3	(Greece) (Republic of Ireland)

Austria vs. Yugoslavia

Austria
2
Bad Homburg Tennis Club, Bad Homburg, West Germany
3 May 1973
Clay

Yugoslavia
1

			1	2	3
1	(Austria) (Socialist Federal Republic of Yugoslavia)	Sonja Pachta; Mima Jaušovec	3; 6	6; 2	2; 6
2	(Austria) (Socialist Federal Republic of Yugoslavia)	Veronika Buche; Jelena Genčić	6; 3	6; 1
3	(Austria) (Socialist Federal Republic of Yugoslavia)	Veronika Buche / Sonja Pachta; Jelena Genčić / Mima Jaušovec	7; 5	7; 5

Argentina vs. Japan

Argentina
0
Bad Homburg Tennis Club, Bad Homburg, West Germany
3 May 1973
Clay

Japan
2

			1	2	3
1	(Argentina) (Japan)	Inés Roget; Kazuko Sawamatsu	1; 6	1; 6
2	(Argentina) (Japan)	Elvira Weisenberger; Hideko Goto	3; 6	5; 7
3	(Argentina) (Japan)					not played

=== Quarterfinals ===
Sweden vs. Norway

Sweden
2
Bad Homburg Tennis Club, Bad Homburg, West Germany
4 May 1973
Clay

Norway
1

			1	2	3
1	(Sweden) (Norway)	Ingrid Bentzer; Ellen Grindvold	6; 3	6; 0
2	(Sweden) (Norway)	Christina Sandberg; Liv Hubert	6; 1	6; 0
3	(Sweden) (Norway)	Ingrid Bentzer / Mimmi Wikstedt; Ellen Grindvold / Liv Hubert	6; 8	6; 8

South Korea vs. Spain

Spain
1
Bad Homburg Tennis Club, Bad Homburg, West Germany
4 May 1973
Clay

South Korea
2

			1	2	3
1	(Spain) (South Korea)	Carmen Mandarino; Yang Jeong-soon	6; 3	3; 6	1; 6
2	(Spain) (South Korea)	Carmen Perea; Lee Duk-hee	6; 1	1; 6	3; 6
3	(Spain) (South Korea)	Carmen Mandarino / Carmen Perea; Lee Duk-hee / Lee Soon-oh	6; 1	6; 1

France vs. Ireland

France
2
Bad Homburg Tennis Club, Bad Homburg, West Germany
4 May 1973
Clay

Ireland
0

			1	2	3
1	(France) (Republic of Ireland)	Nathalie Fuchs; Geraldine Barniville	7; 5	6; 4
2	(France) (Republic of Ireland)	Odile de Roubin; Eleanor McFadden	6; 0	6; 2
3	(France) (Republic of Ireland)					not played

Austria vs. Japan

Austria
0
Bad Homburg Tennis Club, Bad Homburg, West Germany
4 May 1973
Clay

Japan
3

			1	2	3
1	(Austria) (Japan)	Sonja Pachta; Kazuko Sawamatsu	4; 6	1; 6
2	(Austria) (Japan)	Veronika Buche; Hideko Goto	1; 6	5; 7
3	(Austria) (Japan)	Veronika Buche / Sonja Pachta; Kayoko Fukuoka / Kazuko Sawamatsu	0; 6	1; 6

=== Semifinals ===
Sweden vs. South Korea

Sweden
2
Bad Homburg Tennis Club, Bad Homburg, West Germany
5 May 1973
Clay

South Korea
1

			1	2	3
1	(Sweden) (South Korea)	Ingrid Bentzer; Yang Jeong-soon	3; 6	6; 2	6; 3
2	(Sweden) (South Korea)	Christina Sandberg; Lee Duk-hee	6; 2	6; 2
3	(Sweden) (South Korea)	Ingrid Bentzer / Christina Sandberg; Lee Duk-hee / Lee Mi-ok	6; 2	6; 8	2; 6

France vs. Japan

France
1
Bad Homburg Tennis Club, Bad Homburg, West Germany
5 May 1973
Clay

Japan
2

			1	2	3
1	(France) (Japan)	Nathalie Fuchs; Kazuko Sawamatsu	6; 1	6; 3
2	(France) (Japan)	Odile de Roubin; Hideko Goto	1; 6	0; 6
3	(France) (Japan)	Odile de Roubin / Nathalie Fuchs; Kayoko Fukuoka / Kazuko Sawamatsu	2; 6	0; 6

=== Final ===
Sweden vs. Japan

Sweden
2
Bad Homburg Tennis Club, Bad Homburg, West Germany
6 May 1973
Clay

Japan
1

			1	2	3
1	(Sweden) (Japan)	Ingrid Bentzer; Kazuko Sawamatsu	7; 9	1; 6
2	(Sweden) (Japan)	Christina Sandberg; Hideko Goto	6; 1	4; 6	7; 5
3	(Sweden) (Japan)	Ingrid Bentzer / Christina Sandberg; Kayoko Fukuoka / Kazuko Sawamatsu	6; 4	3; 6	6; 0
