= 1973 Wimbledon Championships – Women's singles qualifying =

Women's singles qualifying
- 1973 Wimbledon Championships

Events
Singles	men	women		boys	girls
Doubles	men	women	mixed	boys	girls
WC Singles	men	women	quad
WC Doubles	men	women	quad
Legends	men	women	seniors

Qualification
Singles	men	women
Doubles	men	women
- Wimbledon Championships

Players who neither had high enough rankings nor received wild cards to enter the main draw of the annual Wimbledon Tennis Championships participated in a qualifying tournament held one week before the event.

== Qualifiers ==
1. (United Kingdom) Claire Colman
2. (Sweden) Mimmi Wikstedt
3. (United States) Peggy Michel
4. (United States) Kate Latham
5. (Canada) Janice Tindle
6. (Canada) Vicki Berner
7. (United Kingdom) Annette Coe
8. (United States) Tory Fretz

== Lucky losers ==
1. (United States) Judy Dixon

== Qualifying draw ==
Key

- Q = Qualifier
- WC = Wild card
- LL = Lucky loser
- Alt = Alternate
- ITF = ITF entry
- PR = Protected ranking
- SR = Special ranking
- SE = Special exempt
- JE = Junior exempt
- JR = Junior Accelerator Programme entrant
- CO = College Accelerator Programme entrant
- NG = Next Gen Accelerator Program entrant
- w/o = Walkover
- r = Retired
- d = Defaulted

=== First qualifier ===
First round
1	(United Kingdom) Claire Colman	7	6
8	(Argentina) Ana María Arias	5	3
4	(Canada) Barbara Brankovska	7	6	7
5	(Australia) Pat Faulkner	5	8	5
2	(United States) Gail Elliott	6	6
7	(Australia) Norma Eastburn	2	4
3	(Israel) Paulina Peled	6	6
6	(United Kingdom) Wendy Slaughter	3	3

Second round
(United Kingdom) Claire Colman	6	6
(Canada) Barbara Brankovska	2	2
(United States) Gail Elliott	6	6
(Israel) Paulina Peled	2	4

Qualifying competition
(United Kingdom) Claire Colman	5	6	6
(United States) Gail Elliott	7	3	2

=== Second qualifier ===
First round
1	(Sweden) Mimmi Wikstedt	6	7
8	(Netherlands) Tine Zwaan	2	5
4	(Hungary) Erzsébet Széll	6	6
5	(United Kingdom) Jane Poynder	0	2
2	(Republic of Ireland) Sue Minford	6	6
7	(Australia) S.J. Thompson	3	1
3	(United Kingdom) Frances Taylor	5	6	7
6	(Sweden) Madelaine Pegel	7	1	5

Second round
(Sweden) Mimmi Wikstedt	6	1	6
(Hungary) Erzsébet Széll	0	6	4
(Republic of Ireland) Sue Minford	1	9	6
(United Kingdom) Frances Taylor	6	8	3

Qualifying competition
(Sweden) Mimmi Wikstedt	4	6	6
(Republic of Ireland) Sue Minford	6	2	4

=== Third qualifier ===
First round
1	(United States) Peggy Michel	6	6
8	(United Kingdom) Cherry Panton	2	1
4	(Belgium) Monique Van Haver	6	6
5	(Brazil) Andrea Menezes	1	4
2	(South Africa) Brigitte Cuypers	6	6
7	(United States) Shelby Torrance	0	1
3	(United Kingdom) Judy Congdon	6	6
6	(Mexico) Gina Díaz-Ponce	4	0

Second round
(United States) Peggy Michel	6	6
(Belgium) Monique Van Haver	2	1
(South Africa) Brigitte Cuypers	6	6
(United Kingdom) Judy Congdon	2	0

Qualifying competition
(United States) Peggy Michel	6	4	6
(South Africa) Brigitte Cuypers	3	6	4

=== Fourth qualifier ===
First round
1	(United States) Kate Latham	6	6
8	(United Kingdom) Diane Riste	1	1
4	(Australia) K. Walker	6	4	6
5	(Netherlands) Elly Appel-Vessies	0	6	4
2	(Argentina) Elvira Weisenberger	6	5	6
7	(United States) Mary Struthers	3	7	3
3	(South Korea) Yang Jeong-soon	4	6	6
6	(United Kingdom) Belinda Thompson	6	2	0

Second round
(United States) Kate Latham	6	6
(Australia) K. Walker	0	0
(Argentina) Elvira Weisenberger	7	4	6
(South Korea) Yang Jeong-soon	5	6	2

Qualifying competition
(United States) Kate Latham	6	2	6
(Argentina) Elvira Weisenberger	2	6	1

=== Fifth qualifier ===
First round
1	(Canada) Janice Tindle	6	6
8	(United States) Ceci Martinez	4	3
4	(Republic of Ireland) Geraldine Barniville	6	6
5	(Japan) Kayoko Fukuoka	3	4
2	(Australia) Jenny Walker	4	6	6
7	(Spain) Carmen Perea-Alcala	6	2	1
3	(United Kingdom) Frances Candy	6	5	6
6	(United Kingdom) Rita Lauder	4	7	1

Second round
(Canada) Janice Tindle	6	9
(Republic of Ireland) Geraldine Barniville	4	7
(Australia) Jenny Walker	6	6
(United Kingdom) Frances Candy	4	4

Qualifying competition
(Canada) Janice Tindle	7	6
(Australia) Jenny Walker	5	2

=== Sixth qualifier ===
First round
1	(Canada) Vicki Berner	6	6
8	(South Africa) B.H. Bethlehem	3	3
4	(Japan) Naoko Sato	6	6
5	(Australia) Mandy Morgan	3	1
2	(United States) Judy Dixon	3	6	6
7	(United Kingdom) Jenny Helliar	6	0	2
3	(Australia) Kerry Hogarth	6	6
6	(New Zealand) Judy Connor	4	4

Second round
(Canada) Vicki Berner	9	6
(Japan) Naoko Sato	8	3
(United States) Judy Dixon	5	8	6
(Australia) Kerry Hogarth	7	6	1

Qualifying competition
(Canada) Vicki Berner	6	7
(United States) Judy Dixon	4	5

=== Seventh qualifier ===
First round
1	(United Kingdom) Annette Coe	7	6	6
8	(Costa Rica) Monica Rho	5	8	2
4	(France) Florence Guédy	6	6
5	(Australia) Valerie Caulley	2	1
2	(United States) Marjory Gengler	2	6	6
7	(Italy) Daniela Porzio	6	4	1
3	(Australia) Christine Mattison	6	6
6	(Chinese Taipei) Ching-Ling Chang	2	2

Second round
(United Kingdom) Annette Coe	6	7	6
(France) Florence Guédy	8	5	4
(United States) Marjory Gengler	9	6
(Australia) Christine Mattison	8	0

Qualifying competition
(United Kingdom) Annette Coe	4	6	6
(United States) Marjory Gengler	6	4	3

=== Eighth qualifier ===
First round
1	(United States) Tory Fretz	6	6
8	(Netherlands) Nora Lauteslager-Blom	4	3
4	(United Kingdom) Linda Geeves	6	6
5	(South Korea) Lee Mi-ok	4	2
2	(Australia) Marilyn Tesch	6	6
7	(Italy) Rosalba Vido	2	1
3	(United Kingdom) R.E. Pearson	3	6	6
6	(Mexico) Maria-Teresa Salvidea-Diaz	6	4	1

Second round
(United States) Tory Fretz	6	6
(United Kingdom) Linda Geeves	3	2
(Australia) Marilyn Tesch	6	9
(United Kingdom) R.E. Pearson	1	8

Qualifying competition
(United States) Tory Fretz	6	6
(Australia) Marilyn Tesch	3	2
