= 1972 Federation Cup (tennis) =

International women's tennis competition

Details
- Duration: 20 – 25 March
- Edition: 10th

Champion
- Winning nation: South Africa

The 1972 Federation Cup was the tenth edition of the most important competition between national teams in women's tennis. 31 nations participated in the tournament, which was held at Ellis Park in Johannesburg, South Africa from 20 to 25 March. South Africa defeated Great Britain in the final, in what was the first final not featuring United States or Australia, giving South Africa their only title. South Africa became the first team other than United States or Australia to win the Fed Cup.

== Participating teams ==
Participating Teams
| Argentina | Australia | Austria | Belgium | Brazil | Canada | Chinese Taipei | Colombia |
| Denmark | Ecuador | Finland | France | Great Britain | Greece | Iran | Ireland |
| Israel | Italy | Japan | Luxembourg | Mexico | Netherlands | New Zealand | Norway |
| Rhodesia | South Africa | Spain | Switzerland | United States | Uruguay | West Germany | |

== Draw ==
All ties were played at Ellis Park in Johannesburg, South Africa on hard courts.

First Round; 20 March
Israel | 0
Canada | 3
Norway | 2
Chinese Taipei | 1
Spain | 1
Italy | 2
West Germany | 3
Greece | 0
Ireland | 3
Denmark | 0
Finland | 1
Argentina | 2
Japan | 0
Great Britain | 3
France | 3
Austria | 0
Iran | 0
Ecuador | 3
Brazil | 2
Switzerland | 1
Belgium | 0
South Africa | 3
Netherlands | 2
New Zealand | 1
Colombia | 3
Luxembourg | 0
Uruguay | 2
Mexico | 1
Rhodesia | 0
United States | 3

Second Round; 21 March
Australia | 2
Canada | 0
Norway | 0
Italy | 2
West Germany | 2
Ireland | 1
Argentina | 1
Great Britain | 2
France | 2
Ecuador | 0
Brazil | 0
South Africa | 2
Netherlands | 2
Colombia | 1
Uruguay | 0
United States | 2

Quarterfinals; 23 March
Australia | 3
Italy | 0
West Germany | 1
Great Britain | 2
France | 1
South Africa | 2
Netherlands | 0
United States | 3

Semifinals; 24 March
Australia | 1
Great Britain | 2
South Africa | 2
United States | 1

Final; 25 March
Great Britain | 1
South Africa | 2

=== First round ===
Israel vs. Canada

Israel
0
Ellis Park, Johannesburg, South Africa
20 March 1972
Hard

Canada
3

| | | | 1 | 2 | 3 |
|---|---|---|---|---|---|
| 1 | (Israel) (Canada) | Mara Cohen-Mintz; Janice Tindle | 1; 6 | 0; 6 |
| 2 | (Israel) (Canada) | Tova Epstein; Jane O'Hara | 0; 6 | 0; 6 |
| 3 | (Israel) (Canada) | Mara Cohen-Mintz / Tova Epstein; Jane O'Hara / Janice Tindle | 0; 6 | 2; 6 |

Norway vs. Chinese Taipei

Norway
2
Ellis Park, Johannesburg, South Africa
20 March 1972
Hard

Chinese Taipei
1

| | | | 1 | 2 | 3 |
|---|---|---|---|---|---|
| 1 | (Norway) (Chinese Taipei) | Kirsten Robsahm; Liu Yu-han | 6; 2 | 6; 2 |
| 2 | (Norway) (Chinese Taipei) | Ellen Grindvold; Chang Ching-ling | 6; 8 | 7; 5 | 2; 6 |
| 3 | (Norway) (Chinese Taipei) | Ellen Grindvold / Kirsten Robsahm; Chan Shiu-man / Chang Ching-ling | 6; 0 | 6; 2 |

Spain vs. Italy

Spain
1
Ellis Park, Johannesburg, South Africa
20 March 1972
Hard

Italy
2

| | | | 1 | 2 | 3 |
|---|---|---|---|---|---|
| 1 | (Spain) (Italy) | Ana María Estalella Manso; Rosalba Vido | 7; 5 | 4; 6 | 6; 3 |
| 2 | (Spain) (Italy) | Carmen Mandarino; Anna-Maria Nasuelli | 3; 6 | 6; 1 | 2; 6 |
| 3 | (Spain) (Italy) | Ana María Estalella Manso / Carmen Mandarino; Anna-Maria Nasuelli / Rosalba Vido | 2; 6 | 4; 6 |

West Germany vs. Greece

West Germany
3
Ellis Park, Johannesburg, South Africa
20 March 1972
Hard

Greece
0

| | | | 1 | 2 | 3 |
|---|---|---|---|---|---|
| 1 | (West Germany) (Greece) | Helga Masthoff; Alice Koutsouri | 6; 2 | 6; 1 |
| 2 | (West Germany) (Greece) | Katja Ebbinghaus; Dionissia Asteri | 8; 6 | 10; 8 |
| 3 | (West Germany) (Greece) | Helga Masthoff / Heide Schildknecht; Dionissia Asteri / Alex Rotas | 6; 1 | 6; 1 |

Ireland vs. Denmark

Ireland
3
Ellis Park, Johannesburg, South Africa
20 March 1972
Hard

Denmark
0

| | | | 1 | 2 | 3 |
|---|---|---|---|---|---|
| 1 | (Republic of Ireland) (Denmark) | Susan Minford; Gitte Ejlerskov | 6; 0 | 6; 1 |
| 2 | (Republic of Ireland) (Denmark) | Geraldine Barniville; Anne-Mette Sørensen | 6; 1 | 6; 1 |
| 3 | (Republic of Ireland) (Denmark) | Geraldine Barniville / Eleanor McFadden; Mari-Ann Klougart / Lotte Solbeck | 6; 1 | 6; 3 |

Finland vs. Argentina

Finland
1
Ellis Park, Johannesburg, South Africa
20 March 1972
Hard

Argentina
2

| | | | 1 | 2 | 3 |
|---|---|---|---|---|---|
| 1 | (Finland) (Argentina) | Helena Laitinen; Raquel Giscafré | 1; 6 | 0; 6 |
| 2 | (Finland) (Argentina) | Leena Mutanen; Beatriz Araujo | 9; 7 | 8; 10 | 6; 4 |
| 3 | (Finland) (Argentina) | Helena Laitinen / Leena Mutanen; Beatriz Araujo / Raquel Giscafré | 1; 6 | 2; 6 |

Japan vs. Great Britain

Japan
0
Ellis Park, Johannesburg, South Africa
20 March 1972
Hard

Great Britain
3

| | | | 1 | 2 | 3 |
|---|---|---|---|---|---|
| 1 | (Japan) (United Kingdom) | Kazuko Sawamatsu; Virginia Wade | 2; 6 | 3; 6 |
| 2 | (Japan) (United Kingdom) | Kimiyo Hatanaka; Winnie Shaw | 4; 6 | 1; 6 |
| 3 | (Japan) (United Kingdom) | Kimiyo Hatanaka / Kazuko Sawamatsu; Virginia Wade / Joyce Williams | 1; 6 | 2; 6 |

France vs. Austria

France
3
Ellis Park, Johannesburg, South Africa
20 March 1972
Hard

Austria
0

| | | | 1 | 2 | 3 |
|---|---|---|---|---|---|
| 1 | (France) (Austria) | Gail Chanfreau; Sabine Benegger | 6; 1 | 6; 0 |
| 2 | (France) (Austria) | Françoise Dürr; Sonja Pachta | 6; 2 | 6; 2 |
| 3 | (France) (Austria) | Gail Chanfreau / Françoise Dürr; Veronika Buche / Sonja Pachta | 6; 1 | 6; 1 |

Iran vs. Ecuador

Iran
0
Ellis Park, Johannesburg, South Africa
20 March 1972
Hard

Ecuador
3

| | | | 1 | 2 | 3 |
|---|---|---|---|---|---|
| 1 | (Iran) (Ecuador) | Parvin Afshar; Ana María Ycaza | 0; 6 | 2; 6 |
| 2 | (Iran) (Ecuador) | Sadigheh Akbari; María Eugenia Guzmán | 4; 6 | 2; 6 |
| 3 | (Iran) (Ecuador) | Parvin Afshar / Sadigheh Akbari; María Eugenia Guzmán / Ana María Ycaza | 0; 6 | 0; 6 |

Brazil vs. Switzerland

Brazil
2
Ellis Park, Johannesburg, South Africa
20 March 1972
Hard

Switzerland
1

| | | | 1 | 2 | 3 |
|---|---|---|---|---|---|
| 1 | (Brazil) (Switzerland) | Beatrice Chrystman; Evagreth Emmenegger | 1; 6 | 6; 4 | 6; 4 |
| 2 | (Brazil) (Switzerland) | Andrea Menezes; Rita Felix | 6; 4 | 2; 6 | 6; 1 |
| 3 | (Brazil) (Switzerland) | Beatrice Chrystman / Iris Riedel; Evagreth Emmenegger / Marianne Kindler | 2; 6 | 6; 4 | 3; 6 |

Belgium vs. South Africa

Belgium
0
Ellis Park, Johannesburg, South Africa
20 March 1972
Hard

South Africa
3

| | | | 1 | 2 | 3 |
|---|---|---|---|---|---|
| 1 | (Belgium) (South Africa) | Monique Van Haver; Brenda Kirk | 2; 6 | 4; 6 |
| 2 | (Belgium) (South Africa) | Michèle Gurdal; Patricia Walkden | 7; 5 | 2; 6 | 1; 6 |
| 3 | (Belgium) (South Africa) | Michèle Gurdal / Monique Van Haver; Greta Delport / Patricia Walkden | 1; 6 | 4; 6 |

Netherlands vs. New Zealand

Netherlands
2
Ellis Park, Johannesburg, South Africa
20 March 1972
Hard

New Zealand
1

| | | | 1 | 2 | 3 |
|---|---|---|---|---|---|
| 1 | (Netherlands) (New Zealand) | Marijke Schaar; Marilyn Pryde | 1; 6 | 2; 6 |
| 2 | (Netherlands) (New Zealand) | Betty Stöve; Robyn Hunt | 6; 4 | 6; 2 |
| 3 | (Netherlands) (New Zealand) | Betty Stöve / Gertruida Walhof; Robyn Hunt / Marilyn Pryde | 15; 13 | 10; 8 |

Colombia vs. Luxembourg

Colombia
3
Ellis Park, Johannesburg, South Africa
20 March 1972
Hard

Luxembourg
0

| | | | 1 | 2 | 3 |
|---|---|---|---|---|---|
| 1 | (Colombia) (Luxembourg) | María Victoria de Moggio; Josiane Graas | 6; 1 | 6; 2 |
| 2 | (Colombia) (Luxembourg) | Isabel Fernández de Soto; Flore Wagner | 6; 0 | 6; 1 |
| 3 | (Colombia) (Luxembourg) | María Victoria de Moggio / Isabel Fernández de Soto; Josiane Graas / Monique Krecke | 6; 2 | 6; 2 |

Uruguay vs. Mexico

Uruguay
2
Ellis Park, Johannesburg, South Africa
20 March 1972
Hard

Mexico
1

| | | | 1 | 2 | 3 |
|---|---|---|---|---|---|
| 1 | (Uruguay) (Mexico) | Mary Puljak; Elena Subirats | 4; 6 | 0; 6 |
| 2 | (Uruguay) (Mexico) | Fiorella Bonicelli; Yola Ramírez | 6; 4 | 6; 8 | 6; 2 |
| 3 | (Uruguay) (Mexico) | Fiorella Bonicelli / Lucia Sarno; Yola Ramírez / Elena Subirats | 11; 9 | 2; 6 | 8; 6 |

Rhodesia vs. United States

Rhodesia
0
Ellis Park, Johannesburg, South Africa
20 March 1972
Hard

United States
3

| | | | 1 | 2 | 3 |
|---|---|---|---|---|---|
| 1 | (Rhodesia) (United States) | Daphne Pattison; Valerie Ziegenfuss | 0; 6 | 3; 6 |
| 2 | (Rhodesia) (United States) | Sally Hudson-Beck; Linda Tuero | 4; 6 | 1; 6 |
| 3 | (Rhodesia) (United States) | Sally Hudson-Beck / Daphne Pattison; Sharon Walsh / Valerie Ziegenfuss | 0; 6 | 4; 6 |

=== Second round ===
Australia vs. Canada

Australia
2
Ellis Park, Johannesburg, South Africa
21 March 1972
Hard

Canada
0

| | | | 1 | 2 | 3 |
|---|---|---|---|---|---|---|
| 1 | (Australia) (Canada) | Helen Gourlay; Janice Tindle | 6; 3 | 6; 4 |
| 2 | (Australia) (Canada) | Evonne Goolagong; Jane O'Hara | 6; 3 | 6; 1 |
| 3 | (Australia) (Canada) | | | | | not played |

Norway vs. Italy

Norway
0
Ellis Park, Johannesburg, South Africa
21 March 1972
Hard

Italy
2

| | | | 1 | 2 | 3 |
|---|---|---|---|---|---|---|
| 1 | (Norway) (Italy) | Ellen Grindvold; Anna-Maria Nasuelli | 3; 6 | 2; 6 |
| 2 | (Norway) (Italy) | Kirsten Robsahm; Rosalba Vido | 5; 7 | 1; 6 |
| 3 | (Norway) (Italy) | | | | | not played |

West Germany vs. Ireland

West Germany
2
Ellis Park, Johannesburg, South Africa
21 March 1972
Hard

Ireland
1

| | | | 1 | 2 | 3 |
|---|---|---|---|---|---|
| 1 | (West Germany) (Republic of Ireland) | Helga Masthoff; Geraldine Barniville | 6; 0 | 6; 3 |
| 2 | (West Germany) (Republic of Ireland) | Katja Ebbinghaus; Susan Minford | 3; 6 | 6; 4 | 4; 6 |
| 3 | (West Germany) (Republic of Ireland) | Helga Masthoff / Heide Schildknecht; Geraldine Barniville / Susan Minford | 6; 1 | 6; 2 |

Argentina vs. Great Britain

Argentina
1
Ellis Park, Johannesburg, South Africa
21 March 1972
Hard

Great Britain
2

| | | | 1 | 2 | 3 |
|---|---|---|---|---|---|
| 1 | (Argentina) (United Kingdom) | Raquel Giscafré; Winnie Shaw | 3; 6 | 5; 7 |
| 2 | (Argentina) (United Kingdom) | Beatriz Araujo; Virginia Wade | 3; 6 | 8; 10 |
| 3 | (Argentina) (United Kingdom) | Beatriz Araujo / Raquel Giscafré; Winnie Shaw / Virginia Wade | 6; 4 | 2; 6 | 6; 3 |

France vs. Ecuador

France
2
Ellis Park, Johannesburg, South Africa
21 March 1972
Hard

Ecuador
0

| | | | 1 | 2 | 3 |
|---|---|---|---|---|---|---|
| 1 | (France) (Ecuador) | Gail Chanfreau; Ana María Ycaza | 6; 1 | 6; 1 |
| 2 | (France) (Ecuador) | Françoise Dürr; María Eugenia Guzmán | 6; 1 | 6; 3 |
| 3 | (France) (Ecuador) | | | | | not played |

Brazil vs. South Africa

Brazil
0
Ellis Park, Johannesburg, South Africa
21 March 1972
Hard

South Africa
2

| | | | 1 | 2 | 3 |
|---|---|---|---|---|---|---|
| 1 | (Brazil) (South Africa) | Beatrice Chrystman; Brenda Kirk | 4; 6 | 1; 6 |
| 2 | (Brazil) (South Africa) | Andrea Menezes; Patricia Walkden | 2; 6 | 2; 6 |
| 3 | (Brazil) (South Africa) | | | | | not played |

Netherlands vs. Colombia

Netherlands
2
Ellis Park, Johannesburg, South Africa
21 March 1972
Hard

Colombia
1

| | | | 1 | 2 | 3 |
|---|---|---|---|---|---|
| 1 | (Netherlands) (Colombia) | Marijke Schaar; Isabel Fernández de Soto | 2; 6 | 6; 2 | 3; 6 |
| 2 | (Netherlands) (Colombia) | Betty Stöve; María Victoria de Moggio | 6; 1 | 6; 0 |
| 3 | (Netherlands) (Colombia) | Betty Stöve / Gertruida Walhof; María Victoria de Moggio / Isabel Fernández de Soto | 6; 2 | 6; 1 |

Uruguay vs. United States

Uruguay
0
Ellis Park, Johannesburg, South Africa
21 March 1972
Hard

United States
2

| | | | 1 | 2 | 3 |
|---|---|---|---|---|---|---|
| 1 | (Uruguay) (United States) | Fiorella Bonicelli; Valerie Ziegenfuss | 1; 6 | 0; 6 |
| 2 | (Uruguay) (United States) | Mary Puljak; Linda Tuero | 0; 6 | 0; 6 |
| 3 | (Uruguay) (United States) | | | | | not played |

=== Quarterfinals ===
Australia vs. Italy

Australia
3
Ellis Park, Johannesburg, South Africa
23 March 1972
Hard

Italy
0

| | | | 1 | 2 | 3 |
|---|---|---|---|---|---|
| 1 | (Australia) (Italy) | Evonne Goolagong; Anna-Maria Nasuelli | 6; 0 | 6; 3 |
| 2 | (Australia) (Italy) | Lesley Hunt; Monica Giorgi | 6; 1 | 6; 1 |
| 3 | (Australia) (Italy) | Evonne Goolagong / Helen Gourlay; Monica Giorgi / Anna-Maria Nasuelli | 6; 4 | 6; 1 |

West Germany vs. Great Britain

West Germany
1
Ellis Park, Johannesburg, South Africa
23 March 1972
Hard

Great Britain
2

| | | | 1 | 2 | 3 |
|---|---|---|---|---|---|
| 1 | (West Germany) (United Kingdom) | Heide Schildknecht; Winnie Shaw | 0; 6 | 1; 6 |
| 2 | (West Germany) (United Kingdom) | Helga Masthoff; Virginia Wade | 2; 6 | 1; 6 |
| 3 | (West Germany) (United Kingdom) | Helga Masthoff / Heide Schildknecht; Winnie Shaw / Virginia Wade | 3; 6 | 6; 4 | 6; 4 |

France vs. South Africa

France
1
Ellis Park, Johannesburg, South Africa
23 March 1972
Hard

South Africa
2

| | | | 1 | 2 | 3 |
|---|---|---|---|---|---|
| 1 | (France) (South Africa) | Françoise Dürr; Patricia Walkden | 7; 5 | 3; 6 | 6; 3 |
| 2 | (France) (South Africa) | Gail Chanfreau; Brenda Kirk | 4; 6 | 6; 0 | 2; 6 |
| 3 | (France) (South Africa) | Gail Chanfreau / Françoise Dürr; Brenda Kirk / Patricia Walkden | 3; 6 | 4; 6 |

Netherlands vs. United States

Netherlands
0
Ellis Park, Johannesburg, South Africa
23 March 1972
Hard

United States
3

| | | | 1 | 2 | 3 |
|---|---|---|---|---|---|
| 1 | (Netherlands) (United States) | Gertruida Walhof; Linda Tuero | 6; 3 | 1; 6 | 7; 9 |
| 2 | (Netherlands) (United States) | Marijke Schaar; Valerie Ziegenfuss | 2; 6 | 7; 5 | 5; 7 |
| 3 | (Netherlands) (United States) | Marijke Schaar / Gertruida Walhof; Sharon Walsh / Valerie Ziegenfuss | 6; 8 | 3; 6 |

=== Semifinals ===
Australia vs. Great Britain

Australia
1
Ellis Park, Johannesburg, South Africa
24 March 1972
Hard

Great Britain
2

| | | | 1 | 2 | 3 |
|---|---|---|---|---|---|
| 1 | (Australia) (United Kingdom) | Helen Gourlay; Winnie Shaw | 6; 4 | 3; 6 | 3; 6 |
| 2 | (Australia) (United Kingdom) | Evonne Goolagong; Virginia Wade | 6; 4 | 8; 10 | 6; 1 |
| 3 | (Australia) (United Kingdom) | Evonne Goolagong / Helen Gourlay; Virginia Wade / Joyce Williams | 2; 6 | 3; 6 |

South Africa vs. United States

South Africa
2
Ellis Park, Johannesburg, South Africa
24 March 1972
Hard

United States
1

| | | | 1 | 2 | 3 |
|---|---|---|---|---|---|
| 1 | (South Africa) (United States) | Patricia Walkden; Valerie Ziegenfuss | 4; 6 | 7; 5 | 4; 6 |
| 2 | (South Africa) (United States) | Brenda Kirk; Linda Tuero | 6; 3 | 6; 2 |
| 3 | (South Africa) (United States) | Brenda Kirk / Patricia Walkden; Sharon Walsh / Valerie Ziegenfuss | 8; 6 | 6; 1 |

=== Final ===
Great Britain vs. South Africa

Great Britain
1
Ellis Park, Johannesburg, South Africa
25 March 1972
Hard

South Africa
2

| | | | 1 | 2 | 3 |
|---|---|---|---|---|---|
| 1 | (United Kingdom) (South Africa) | Virginia Wade; Patricia Walkden | 6; 3 | 6; 2 |
| 2 | (United Kingdom) (South Africa) | Winnie Shaw; Brenda Kirk | 6; 4 | 5; 7 | 0; 6 |
| 3 | (United Kingdom) (South Africa) | Virginia Wade / Joyce Williams; Brenda Kirk / Patricia Walkden | 1; 6 | 5; 7 |

== Consolation Round ==
Teams which lost in the first or second round of the main draw went on to play in the Consolation Round.

=== Draw ===
Consolation first round 22 March
Mexico | 2
Greece | 0
Spain | 0
Canada | 2
Brazil | 2
Luxembourg | 0
Austria | 1
Uruguay | 2
Japan | 3
Iran | 0
Rhodesia | 3
Norway | 0
Denmark | 3
Chinese Taipei | 0

Consolation second round 22–23 March
New Zealand | 3
Finland | 0
Switzerland | 1
Colombia | 2
Mexico | 2
Canada | 0
Brazil | 1
Uruguay | 2
Japan | 2
Rhodesia | 1
Denmark
Argentina | w/o
Belgium | 3
Israel | 0
Ecuador | 2
Ireland | 1

Consolation Quarterfinals; 23 March
New Zealand | 0
Colombia | 2
Mexico | 2
Uruguay | 1
Japan | 2
Denmark | 0
Belgium | 3
Ecuador | 0

Consolation Semifinals; 24 March
Colombia | 2
Mexico | 1
Japan | 2
Belgium | 1

Consolation final 25 March
Colombia | 0
Japan | 3

=== First round ===
Mexico vs. Greece

Mexico
2
Ellis Park, Johannesburg, South Africa
22 March 1972
Hard

Greece
0

| | | | 1 | 2 | 3 |
|---|---|---|---|---|---|---|
| 1 | (Mexico) (Greece) | Elena Subirats; Dionissia Asteri | 6; 1 | 6; 3 |
| 2 | (Mexico) (Greece) | Yola Ramírez; Alice Koutsouri | 6; 0 | 6; 0 |
| 3 | (Mexico) (Greece) | | | | | not played |

Spain vs. Canada

Spain
0
Ellis Park, Johannesburg, South Africa
22 March 1972
Hard

Canada
2

| | | | 1 | 2 | 3 |
|---|---|---|---|---|---|---|
| 1 | (Spain) (Canada) | Ana María Estalella Manso; Janice Tindle | 3; 6 | 4; 6 |
| 2 | (Spain) (Canada) | Carmen Mandarino; Jane O'Hara | 6; 2 | 3; 6 | 5; 7 |
| 3 | (Spain) (Canada) | | | | | not played |

Brazil vs. Luxembourg

Brazil
2
Ellis Park, Johannesburg, South Africa
22 March 1972
Hard

Luxembourg
0

| | | | 1 | 2 | 3 |
|---|---|---|---|---|---|---|
| 1 | (Brazil) (Luxembourg) | Andrea Menezes; Flore Wagner | 6; 1 | 6; 3 |
| 2 | (Brazil) (Luxembourg) | Beatrice Chrystman; Josiane Graas | 6; 4 | 10; 8 |
| 3 | (Brazil) (Luxembourg) | | | | | not played |

Austria vs. Uruguay

Austria
1
Ellis Park, Johannesburg, South Africa
22 March 1972
Hard

Uruguay
2

| | | | 1 | 2 | 3 |
|---|---|---|---|---|---|
| 1 | (Austria) (Uruguay) | Sabine Benegger; Mary Puljak | 6; 2 | 7; 5 |
| 2 | (Austria) (Uruguay) | Sonja Pachta; Fiorella Bonicelli | 8; 6 | 2; 6 | 3; 6 |
| 3 | (Austria) (Uruguay) | Veronika Buche / Sonja Pachta; Fiorella Bonicelli / Lucia Sarno | 5; 7 | 6; 1 | 1; 6 |

Japan vs. Iran

Japan
3
Ellis Park, Johannesburg, South Africa
22 March 1972
Hard

Iran
0

| | | | 1 | 2 | 3 |
|---|---|---|---|---|---|
| 1 | (Japan) (Iran) | Kazuko Sawamatsu; Sadigheh Akbari | 6; 0 | 6; 2 |
| 2 | (Japan) (Iran) | Kimiyo Hatanaka; Parvin Afshar | 6; 3 | 6; 1 |
| 3 | (Japan) (Iran) | Kimiyo Hatanaka / Kazuko Sawamatsu; Parvin Afshar / Sadigheh Akbari | 6; 0 | 6; 0 |

Rhodesia vs. Norway

Rhodesia
3
Ellis Park, Johannesburg, South Africa
22 March 1972
Hard

Norway
0

| | | | 1 | 2 | 3 |
|---|---|---|---|---|---|
| 1 | (Rhodesia) (Norway) | Daphne Pattison; Ellen Grindvold | 6; 2 | 6; 4 |
| 2 | (Rhodesia) (Norway) | Sally Hudson-Beck; Kirsten Robsahm | 6; 2 | 6; 3 |
| 3 | (Rhodesia) (Norway) | Daphne Pattison / Jennifer Waggott; Ellen Grindvold / Kirsten Robsahm | 6; 4 | 2; 6 | 6; 4 |

Denmark vs. Chinese Taipei

Chinese Taipei
3
Ellis Park, Johannesburg, South Africa
22 March 1972
Hard

Denmark
0

| | | | 1 | 2 | 3 |
|---|---|---|---|---|---|
| 1 | (Chinese Taipei) (Denmark) | Anne-Mette Sørensen; Liu Yu-han | 6; 3 | 6; 4 |
| 2 | (Chinese Taipei) (Denmark) | Gitte Ejlerskov; Chan Shiu-man | 6; 3 | 6; 3 |
| 3 | (Chinese Taipei) (Denmark) | Mari-Ann Klougart / Lotte Solbeck; Chan Shiu-man / Liu Yu-han | 6; 4 | 6; 3 |

=== Second round ===
New Zealand vs. Finland

New Zealand
3
Ellis Park, Johannesburg, South Africa
23 March 1972
Hard

Finland
0

| | | | 1 | 2 | 3 |
|---|---|---|---|---|---|---|
| 1 | (New Zealand) (Finland) | Marilyn Pryde; Leena Mutanen | 3; 6 | 6; 3 | 6; 0 |
| 2 | (New Zealand) (Finland) | Robyn Hunt; Helena Laitinen | 7; 5 | 6; 1 |
| 3 | (New Zealand) (Finland) | Judy Connor / Robyn Hunt; Leena Mutanen / Laila Pirila | 6; 4 | 1; 3 | | retired |

Switzerland vs. Colombia

Switzerland
1
Ellis Park, Johannesburg, South Africa
23 March 1972
Hard

Colombia
2

| | | | 1 | 2 | 3 |
|---|---|---|---|---|---|
| 1 | (Switzerland) (Colombia) | Rita Felix; Isabel Fernández de Soto | 2; 6 | 3; 6 |
| 2 | (Switzerland) (Colombia) | Marianne Kindler; María Victoria de Moggio | 6; 3 | 1; 6 | 6; 1 |
| 3 | (Switzerland) (Colombia) | Evagreth Emmenegger / Rita Felix; María Victoria de Moggio / Isabel Fernández de Soto | 7; 5 | 4; 6 | 1; 6 |

Mexico vs. Canada

Mexico
2
Ellis Park, Johannesburg, South Africa
23 March 1972
Hard

Canada
0

| | | | 1 | 2 | 3 |
|---|---|---|---|---|---|---|
| 1 | (Mexico) (Canada) | Elena Subirats; Janice Tindle | 6; 4 | 6; 4 |
| 2 | (Mexico) (Canada) | Yola Ramírez; Jane O'Hara | 6; 4 | 10; 8 |
| 3 | (Mexico) (Canada) | | | | | not played |

Brazil vs. Uruguay

Brazil
1
Ellis Park, Johannesburg, South Africa
23 March 1972
Hard

Uruguay
2

| | | | 1 | 2 | 3 |
|---|---|---|---|---|---|
| 1 | (Brazil) (Uruguay) | Iris Riedel; Lucia Sarno | 6; 2 | 6; 3 |
| 2 | (Brazil) (Uruguay) | Andrea Menezes; Fiorella Bonicelli | 5; 7 | 3; 6 |
| 3 | (Brazil) (Uruguay) | Andrea Menezes / Iris Riedel; Fiorella Bonicelli / Lucia Sarno | 6; 8 | 2; 6 |

Japan vs. Rhodesia

Japan
2
Ellis Park, Johannesburg, South Africa
22 March 1972
Hard

Rhodesia
1

| | | | 1 | 2 | 3 |
|---|---|---|---|---|---|
| 1 | (Japan) (Rhodesia) | Kazuko Sawamatsu; Daphne Pattison | 6; 4 | 6; 1 |
| 2 | (Japan) (Rhodesia) | Kimiyo Hatanaka; Sally Hudson-Beck | 5; 7 | 6; 2 | 2; 6 |
| 3 | (Japan) (Rhodesia) | Kimiyo Hatanaka / Kazuko Sawamatsu; Daphne Pattison / Jennifer Waggott | 6; 3 | 6; 1 |

Belgium vs. Israel

Belgium
3
Ellis Park, Johannesburg, South Africa
22 March 1972
Hard

Israel
0

| | | | 1 | 2 | 3 |
|---|---|---|---|---|---|
| 1 | (Belgium) (Israel) | Michèle Gurdal; Tova Epstein | 6; 4 | 6; 1 |
| 2 | (Belgium) (Israel) | Monique Van Haver; Mara Cohen-Mintz | 6; 1 | 6; 0 |
| 3 | (Belgium) (Israel) | Michèle Gurdal / Monique Van Haver; Tova Epstein / Gillian Kay | 6; 2 | 6; 0 |

Ecuador vs. Ireland

Ecuador
2
Ellis Park, Johannesburg, South Africa
22 March 1972
Hard

Ireland
1

| | | | 1 | 2 | 3 |
|---|---|---|---|---|---|
| 1 | (Ecuador) (Republic of Ireland) | María Eugenia Guzmán; Geraldine Barniville | 6; 4 | 6; 1 |
| 2 | (Ecuador) (Republic of Ireland) | Rosario Briones; Eleanor McFadden | 0; 6 | 3; 6 |
| 3 | (Ecuador) (Republic of Ireland) | María Eugenia Guzmán / Ana María Ycaza; Geraldine Barniville / Eleanor McFadden | 6; 3 | 6; 8 | 6; 3 |

=== Quarterfinals ===
New Zealand vs. Colombia

New Zealand
0
Ellis Park, Johannesburg, South Africa
23 March 1972
Hard

Colombia
2

| | | | 1 | 2 | 3 |
|---|---|---|---|---|---|---|
| 1 | (New Zealand) (Colombia) | Robyn Hunt; María Victoria de Moggio | 4; 6 | 6; 3 | 4; 6 |
| 2 | (New Zealand) (Colombia) | Marilyn Pryde; Isabel Fernández de Soto | 4; 6 | 2; 6 |
| 3 | (New Zealand) (Colombia) | | | | | not played |

Mexico vs. Uruguay

Mexico
2
Ellis Park, Johannesburg, South Africa
23 March 1972
Hard

Uruguay
1

| | | | 1 | 2 | 3 |
|---|---|---|---|---|---|
| 1 | (Mexico) (Uruguay) | Elena Subirats; Mary Puljak | 6; 2 | 6; 1 |
| 2 | (Mexico) (Uruguay) | Yola Ramírez; Fiorella Bonicelli | 3; 6 | 4; 6 |
| 3 | (Mexico) (Uruguay) | Yola Ramírez / Elena Subirats; Fiorella Bonicelli / Lucia Sarno | 7; 5 | 6; 4 |

Japan vs. Denmark

Japan
2
Ellis Park, Johannesburg, South Africa
23 March 1972
Hard

Denmark
0

| | | | 1 | 2 | 3 |
|---|---|---|---|---|---|---|
| 1 | (Japan) (Denmark) | Kazuko Sawamatsu; Anne-Mette Sørensen | 6; 1 | 6; 0 |
| 2 | (Japan) (Denmark) | Kimiyo Hatanaka; Gitte Ejlerskov | 6; 2 | 6; 1 |
| 3 | (Japan) (Denmark) | | | | | not played |

Belgium vs. Ecuador

Belgium
3
Ellis Park, Johannesburg, South Africa
23 March 1972
Hard

Ecuador
0

| | | | 1 | 2 | 3 |
|---|---|---|---|---|---|
| 1 | (Belgium) (Ecuador) | Michèle Gurdal; María Eugenia Guzmán | 6; 1 | 6; 4 |
| 2 | (Belgium) (Ecuador) | Monique Van Haver; Rosario Briones | 6; 4 | 6; 1 |
| 3 | (Belgium) (Ecuador) | Michèle Gurdal / Monique Van Haver; Rosario Briones / Ana María Ycaza | 6; 1 | 6; 4 |

=== Semifinals ===
Colombia vs. Mexico

Colombia
2
Ellis Park, Johannesburg, South Africa
24 March 1972
Hard

Mexico
1

| | | | 1 | 2 | 3 |
|---|---|---|---|---|---|
| 1 | (Colombia) (Mexico) | Isabel Fernández de Soto; Yola Ramírez | 6; 2 | 6; 1 |
| 2 | (Colombia) (Mexico) | María Victoria de Moggio; Yola Ramírez | 3; 6 | 3; 6 |
| 3 | (Colombia) (Mexico) | María Victoria de Moggio / Isabel Fernández de Soto; Yola Ramírez / Elena Subirats | 6; 3 | 5; 7 | 6; 4 |

Japan vs. Belgium

Japan
2
Ellis Park, Johannesburg, South Africa
24 March 1972
Hard

Belgium
1

| | | | 1 | 2 | 3 |
|---|---|---|---|---|---|
| 1 | (Japan) (Belgium) | Kazuko Sawamatsu; Michèle Gurdal | 6; 2 | 6; 4 |
| 2 | (Japan) (Belgium) | Kimiyo Hatanaka; Monique Van Haver | 6; 8 | 9; 7 | 2; 6 |
| 3 | (Japan) (Belgium) | Kimiyo Hatanaka / Kazuko Sawamatsu; Michèle Gurdal / Monique Van Haver | 8; 6 | 6; 1 |

=== Final ===
Colombia vs. Japan

Colombia
0
Ellis Park, Johannesburg, South Africa
25 March 1972
Hard

Japan
3

| | | | 1 | 2 | 3 |
|---|---|---|---|---|---|
| 1 | (Colombia) (Japan) | Isabel Fernández de Soto; Kazuko Sawamatsu | 6; 8 | 3; 6 |
| 2 | (Colombia) (Japan) | María Victoria de Moggio; Kimiyo Hatanaka | 3; 6 | 6; 8 |
| 3 | (Colombia) (Japan) | María Victoria de Moggio / Isabel Fernández de Soto; Kimiyo Hatanaka / Kazuko Sawamatsu | 3; 6 | 3; 6 |

== See also ==
- 1972 Wightman Cup
