= 1973 French Open – Women's doubles =

Women's doubles
- 1973 French Open

Final
- Champion: (Australia) Margaret Court (United Kingdom) Virginia Wade
- Runner-up: (France) Françoise Dürr (Netherlands) Betty Stöve
- Score: 6–2, 6–3

Events
Singles	men	women		boys	girls
Doubles	men	women	mixed	boys	girls
WC Singles	men	women	quad
WC Doubles	men	women	quad
Legends	−45	45+	women
- French Open

Margaret Court and Virginia Wade defeated defending champion Betty Stöve and her partner Françoise Dürr in the final, 6–2, 6–3 to win the ladies' doubles tennis title at the 1973 French Open.

Billie Jean King and Stöve were the reigning champions, but King did not competed this year.

This marked the first women's doubles major appearance of future record 31-time women's doubles major champion and world No. 1 Martina Navratilova. Partnering Renáta Tomanová, they lost in the quarterfinals to Rosie Darmon and Mariana Simionescu.

== Seeds ==
1. (Australia) Margaret Court / (United Kingdom) Virginia Wade (champions)
2. (France) Françoise Dürr / (Netherlands) Betty Stöve (final)
3. (United States) Chris Evert / (Soviet Union) Olga Morozova (semifinals)
4. (West Germany) Katja Ebbinghaus / (West Germany) Helga Masthoff (quarterfinals)

== Draw ==
Key

- Q = Qualifier
- WC = Wild card
- LL = Lucky loser
- Alt = Alternate
- ITF = ITF entry
- PR = Protected ranking
- SR = Special ranking
- SE = Special exempt
- JE = Junior exempt
- JR = Junior Accelerator Programme entrant
- CO = College Accelerator Programme entrant
- NG = Next Gen Accelerator Program entrant
- w/o = Walkover
- r = Retired
- d = Defaulted

=== Finals ===
Semifinals
2	(France) Françoise Dürr (Netherlands) Betty Stöve	6	6
3	(United States) Chris Evert (Soviet Union) Olga Morozova	3	4
(Soviet Union) Eugenia Birioukova (United States) Mona Schallau	1	4
1	(Australia) Margaret Court (United Kingdom) Virginia Wade	6	6

Final
2	(France) Françoise Dürr (Netherlands) Betty Stöve	2	3
1	(Australia) Margaret Court (United Kingdom) Virginia Wade	6	6

=== Top half ===
First round
2	(France) F Dürr (Netherlands) B Stöve	w/o
(United States) C-L Chang (Japan) H Goto
(Australia) W Paish (South Africa) P Pretorius	7	7
(Sweden) I Bentzer (Sweden) M Wikstedt	6	6
(Australia) P Coleman (Australia) W Turnbull
(France) R Darmon (Romania) M Simionescu	w/o
(Argentina) R Giscafré (Argentina) E Weisenberger	2	1
(Czechoslovakia) M Navratilova (Czechoslovakia) R Tomanová	6	6
3	(United States) C Evert (Soviet Union) O Morozova	w/o
(Hungary) E Polgár (Hungary) E Széll
(Costa Rica) M Rho (Japan) N Sato	6	3	6
(France) N Fuchs (New Zealand) M Pryde	1	6	4
(Australia) C Doerner (United States) L duPont	6	6	6
(Rhodesia) D Pattison (Chile) AM Pinto Bravo	4	7	2
(United States) P Bostrom (United States) S Stap	6	2	5
(Japan) K Fukuoka (Japan) K Sawamatsu	4	6	7

Second round
2	(France) F Dürr (Netherlands) B Stöve	2	6	6
(Australia) W Paish (South Africa) P Pretorius	6	3	3
(France) R Darmon (Romania) M Simionescu	5	5
(Czechoslovakia) M Navratilova (Czechoslovakia) R Tomanová	7	7
3	(United States) C Evert (Soviet Union) O Morozova	6	6
(Costa Rica) M Rho (Japan) N Sato	2	1
(Australia) C Doerner (United States) L duPont	1	3
(Japan) K Fukuoka (Japan) K Sawamatsu	6	6

Quarterfinals
2	(France) F Dürr (Netherlands) B Stöve	6	6
(Czechoslovakia) M Navratilova (Czechoslovakia) R Tomanová	4	4
3	(United States) C Evert (Soviet Union) O Morozova	6	6
(Japan) K Fukuoka (Japan) K Sawamatsu	2	0

Semifinals
2	(France) F Dürr (Netherlands) B Stöve	6	6
3	(United States) C Evert (Soviet Union) O Morozova	3	4

=== Bottom half ===
First round
(Soviet Union) E Birioukova (United States) M Schallau	7	5	6
(United States) B Downs (United States) P Teeguarden	5	7	4
(France) O de Roubin (France) F Guédy	2	1
(United States) P Hogan (United States) S Walsh	6	6
(Australia) E Goolagong (Australia) J Young	6	6
(Romania) J Gohn (Romania) V Ruzici	3	0
(France) D Beillan (France) F Thibault	3	2
4	(West Germany) K Ebbinghaus (West Germany) H Masthoff	6	6
(France) D Bouteleux (Argentina) I Roget	6	6
(Brazil) A Menezes (Chile) S Urroz	3	1
(Czechoslovakia) M Koželuhová (Czechoslovakia) V Vopičková	6	5	0
(Uruguay) F Bonicelli (Colombia) I Fernández de Soto	1	7	6
(United States) K Kemmer (South Africa) L Rossouw	6	6
(South Korea) D-h Lee (South Korea) J-s Yang	1	3
(Indonesia) L Kaligis (Indonesia) L Sugiarto	4	3
1	(Australia) M Court (United Kingdom) V Wade	6	6

Second round
(Soviet Union) E Birioukova (United States) M Schallau	6	6
(United States) P Hogan (United States) S Walsh	3	2
(Australia) E Goolagong (Australia) J Young	6	3	6
4	(West Germany) K Ebbinghaus (West Germany) H Masthoff	3	6	8
(France) D Bouteleux (Argentina) I Roget	5	3
(Uruguay) F Bonicelli (Colombia) I Fernández de Soto	7	6
(United States) K Kemmer (South Africa) L Rossouw	3	2
1	(Australia) M Court (United Kingdom) V Wade	6	6

Quarterfinals
(Soviet Union) E Birioukova (United States) M Schallau	6	6	6
4	(West Germany) K Ebbinghaus (West Germany) H Masthoff	7	1	3
(Uruguay) F Bonicelli (Colombia) I Fernández de Soto	1	2
1	(Australia) M Court (United Kingdom) V Wade	6	6

Semifinals
(Soviet Union) E Birioukova (United States) M Schallau	1	4
1	(Australia) M Court (United Kingdom) V Wade	6	6
