= 1973 French Open – Women's singles =

Women's singles
- 1973 French Open

Final
- Champion: (Australia) Margaret Court
- Runner-up: (United States) Chris Evert
- Score: 6–7^{(5–7)}, 7–6^{(8–6)}, 6–4

Details
- Draw: 64
- Seeds: 8

Events
Singles	men	women		boys	girls
Doubles	men	women	mixed	boys	girls
WC Singles	men	women	quad
WC Doubles	men	women	quad
Legends	−45	45+	women
- French Open

Margaret Court defeated Chris Evert in the final, 6–7^{(5–7)}, 7–6^{(8–6)}, 6–4 to win the women's singles tennis title at the 1973 French Open. It was her fifth French Open singles title and 23rd major singles title overall. It was the first French Open appearance for future seven-time champion Evert.

Billie Jean King was the reigning champion, but chose not to defend her title.

This tournament marked the first singles major appearance of future world No. 1 and 18-time major singles champion Martina Navratilova; she reached the quarterfinals before being defeated by Evonne Goolagong.

== Seeds ==
The seeded players are listed below. Margaret Court is the champion; others show the round in which they were eliminated.

1. (Australia) Margaret Court (champion)
2. (United States) Chris Evert (finalist)
3. (United Kingdom) Virginia Wade (third round)
4. (Australia) Evonne Goolagong (semifinals)
5. (United States) Nancy Gunter (third round)
6. (France) Françoise Dürr (semifinals)
7. (West Germany) Helga Masthoff (quarterfinals)
8. (West Germany) Katja Ebbinghaus (quarterfinals)

== Draw ==
Key

- Q = Qualifier
- WC = Wild card
- LL = Lucky loser
- Alt = Alternate
- ITF = ITF entry
- PR = Protected ranking
- SR = Special ranking
- SE = Special exempt
- JE = Junior exempt
- JR = Junior Accelerator Programme entrant
- CO = College Accelerator Programme entrant
- NG = Next Gen Accelerator Program entrant
- w/o = Walkover
- r = Retired
- d = Defaulted

=== Finals ===
Quarterfinals
1	(Australia) Margaret Court	6	6
8	(West Germany) Katja Ebbinghaus	2	3
4	(Australia) Evonne Goolagong	7	6
(Czechoslovakia) Martina Navratilova	6	4
6	(France) Françoise Dürr	6	1	6
(France) Odile de Roubin	0	6	1
7	(West Germany) Helga Masthoff	3	3
2	(United States) Chris Evert	6	6

Semifinals
1	(Australia) Margaret Court	6	7
4	(Australia) Evonne Goolagong	3	6
6	(France) Françoise Dürr	1	0
2	(United States) Chris Evert	6	6

Final
1	(Australia) Margaret Court	6	7	6
2	(United States) Chris Evert	7	6	4

=== Earlier rounds ===
==== Section 1 ====
First round
(United States) Teeguarden	1	2
1	(Australia) Court	6	6
Q	(France) Darmon	1	1
(Australia) Coleman	6	6
Q	(Rhodesia) Pattison	4	4
(Romania) Gohn	6	6
Q	(France) Bouteleux	5	3
(Netherlands) Stöve	7	6
Q	(Sweden) Wikstedt	6	4	2
(United Kingdom) Fayter	4	6	6
(Czechoslovakia) Palmeová-West	6	2	1
Q	(United States) Bostrom	2	6	6
Q	(France) Guédy	3	3
8	(West Germany) Ebbinghaus	6	6
(Indonesia) Sugiarto	4	2
(Sweden) Sandberg	6	6

Second round
1	(Australia) Court	5	6	6
(Australia) Coleman	7	0	3
(Romania) Gohn	3	2
(Netherlands) Stöve	6	6
(United Kingdom) Fayter	4	6	2
Q	(United States) Bostrom	6	2	6
8	(West Germany) Ebbinghaus	5	7	6
(Sweden) Sandberg	7	5	2

Third round
1	(Australia) Court	6	6
(Netherlands) Stöve	3	2
Q	(United States) Bostrom	2	3
8	(West Germany) Ebbinghaus	6	6

Quarterfinals
1	(Australia) Court	6	6
8	(West Germany) Ebbinghaus	2	3

==== Section 2 ====
First round
(Netherlands) Schaar	2	2
4	(Australia) Goolagong	6	6
(Colombia) Fernández-De Soto	4	5
(Soviet Union) Morozova	6	7
(United Kingdom) Coles	6	4
(United States) duPont	7	6
(Romania) Ruzici	3	6	8
(France) Fuchs	6	3	10
(Australia) Turnbull	1	2
5	(United States) Gunter	6	6
Q	(Italy) Marzano	7	0	5
(South Africa) Rossouw	6	6	7
Q	(Czechoslovakia) Koželuhová	4	3
(Czechoslovakia) Navratilova	6	6
Q	(Spain) Perea	4	2
(Argentina) Giscafré	6	6

Second round
4	(Australia) Goolagong	6	6
(Soviet Union) Morozova	3	3
(United States) duPont	1	6	1
(France) Fuchs	6	2	6
5	(United States) Gunter	6	5	7
(South Africa) Rossouw	3	7	5
(Czechoslovakia) Navratilova	7	6
(Argentina) Giscafré	5	4

Third round
4	(Australia) Goolagong	6	6
(France) Fuchs	0	3
5	(United States) Gunter	3	3
(Czechoslovakia) Navratilova	6	6

Quarterfinals
4	(Australia) Goolagong	7	6
(Czechoslovakia) Navratilova	6	4

==== Section 3 ====
First round
(West Germany) Orth	6	2	1
(Australia) Young	4	6	6
LL	(Chile) Ibarra	2	1
(Uruguay) Bonicelli	6	6
(Indonesia) Kaligis	4	6
(Sweden) Bentzer	6	7
(Czechoslovakia) Neumannová	2	2
6	(France) Dürr	6	6
(Romania) Simionescu	4	3
(France) de Roubin	6	6
(Hungary) Széll	5	6	9
(Italy) Nasuelli	7	1	11
(United States) Hogan	0	4
(Czechoslovakia) Vopičková	6	6
(Hungary) Szörényi	1	3
3	(United Kingdom) Wade	6	6

Second round
(Australia) Young	3	2
(Uruguay) Bonicelli	6	6
(Sweden) Bentzer	2	2
6	(France) Dürr	6	6
(France) de Roubin	6	1	6
(Italy) Nasuelli	2	6	2
(Czechoslovakia) Vopičková	3	1
3	(United Kingdom) Wade	6	6

Third round
(Uruguay) Bonicelli	2	1
6	(France) Dürr	6	6
(France) de Roubin	1	6	6
3	(United Kingdom) Wade	6	2	3

Quarterfinals
6	(France) Dürr	6	1	6
(France) de Roubin	0	6	1

==== Section 4 ====
First round
(Soviet Union) Birioukova	1	6
(United States) Kemmer	6	7
(West Germany) Hösl	7	4	2
(South Africa) Pretorius	5	6	6
(South Korea) Yang	6	4
(United States) Walsh	7	6
(Australia) Paish	4	2
7	(West Germany) Masthoff	6	6
(United States) Schallau	3	1
(Japan) Sawamatsu	6	6
(Soviet Union) Chmyreva	4	3
(Czechoslovakia) Tomanová	6	6
(United States) Downs	1	3
Q	(Japan) Goto	6	6
(Australia) Tesch	1	0
2	(United States) Evert	6	6

Second round
(United States) Kemmer	2	4
(South Africa) Pretorius	6	6
(United States) Walsh	3	6	0
7	(West Germany) Masthoff	6	3	6
(Japan) Sawamatsu	6	1	5
(Czechoslovakia) Tomanová	3	6	7
Q	(Japan) Goto	0	1
2	(United States) Evert	6	6

Third round
(South Africa) Pretorius	2	6	2
7	(West Germany) Masthoff	6	4	6
(Czechoslovakia) Tomanová	2	3
2	(United States) Evert	6	6

Quarterfinals
7	(West Germany) Masthoff	3	3
2	(United States) Evert	6	6

Preceded by 1973 Australian Open – Women's singles	Grand Slam women's singles	Succeeded by 1973 Wimbledon Championships – Women's singles
