= 1973 French Open – Mixed doubles =

Mixed doubles
- 1973 French Open

Final
- Champion: (France) Jean-Claude Barclay (France) Françoise Dürr
- Runner-up: (France) Patrice Dominguez (Netherlands) Betty Stöve
- Score: 6–1, 6–4

Details
- Draw: 32
- Seeds: 4

Events
Singles	men	women		boys	girls
Doubles	men	women	mixed	boys	girls
WC Singles	men	women	quad
WC Doubles	men	women	quad
Legends	−45	45+	women
- French Open

Kim Warwick and Evonne Goolagong were the reigning champions but both players chose not to participate.

Jean-Claude Barclay and Françoise Dürr won in the final 6–1, 6–4 against Patrice Dominguez and Betty Stöve.

== Seeds ==
1. (France) Jean-Claude Barclay / (France) Françoise Dürr (champions)
2. (South Africa) Frew McMillan / (United Kingdom) Virginia Wade (second round)
3. (Soviet Union) Alex Metreveli / (Soviet Union) Olga Morozova (second round)
4. (United States) Cliff Richey / (United States) Nancy Gunter (first round)

== Draw ==
Key

- Q = Qualifier
- WC = Wild card
- LL = Lucky loser
- Alt = Alternate
- ITF = ITF entry
- PR = Protected ranking
- SR = Special ranking
- SE = Special exempt
- JE = Junior exempt
- JR = Junior Accelerator Programme entrant
- CO = College Accelerator Programme entrant
- NG = Next Gen Accelerator Program entrant
- w/o = Walkover
- r = Retired
- d = Defaulted

=== Finals ===
Semifinals
(France) Patrice Dominguez (Netherlands) Betty Stöve	6	4	6
(Colombia) Jairo Velasco (Colombia) Isabel Fernández de Soto	4	6	3
(United States) Frank Froehling (United States) Kristien Kemmer	4	4
1	(France) Jean-Claude Barclay (France) Françoise Dürr	6	6

Final
(France) Patrice Dominguez (Netherlands) Betty Stöve	1	4
1	(France) Jean-Claude Barclay (France) Françoise Dürr	6	6

=== Top half ===
First round
2	(South Africa) F McMillan (United Kingdom) V Wade	w/o
(Brazil) JE Mandarino (Spain) C Mandarino
(Argentina) T Vázquez (Uruguay) F Bonicelli
(Mexico) M Lara (France) R Darmon	w/o
(France) P Dominguez (Netherlands) B Stöve	6	6	7
(Soviet Union) T Kakulia (South Korea) J-s Yang	2	7	5
(United States) D Bleckinger (United States) A Bleckinger
(Australia) C Dibley (United States) P Teeguarden	w/o
3	(Soviet Union) A Metreveli (Soviet Union) O Morozova	w/o
(France) A Todjovic (France) D Beillan
(Australia) R Case (United States) M Schallau
(France) W N'Godrella (France) N Fuchs	w/o
(Argentina) R Cano (Argentina) I Roget	3	4
(Colombia) J Velasco (Colombia) I Fernández de Soto	6	6
(France) J-B Chanfreau (France) D Bouteleux	6	6
(France) M Boulle (Chile) M Rodríguez	3	2

Second round
2	(South Africa) F McMillan (United Kingdom) V Wade	6	3	5
(Mexico) M Lara (France) R Darmon	1	6	7
(France) P Dominguez (Netherlands) B Stöve	w/o
(Australia) C Dibley (United States) P Teeguarden
3	(Soviet Union) A Metreveli (Soviet Union) O Morozova	4	4
(France) W N'Godrella (France) N Fuchs	6	6
(Colombia) J Velasco (Colombia) I Fernández de Soto	6	7	9
(France) J-B Chanfreau (France) D Bouteleux	7	6	7

Quarterfinals
(Mexico) M Lara (France) R Darmon	6	2	3
(France) P Dominguez (Netherlands) B Stöve	4	6	6
(France) W N'Godrella (France) N Fuchs	4	4
(Colombia) J Velasco (Colombia) I Fernández de Soto	6	6

Semifinals
(France) P Dominguez (Netherlands) B Stöve	6	4	6
(Colombia) J Velasco (Colombia) I Fernández de Soto	4	6	3

=== Bottom half ===
First round
(United States) H Lofty (United States) S Stap
(Japan) T Sakai (Japan) K Fukuoka	w/o
(Argentina) G Vilas (Argentina) E Weisenberger	5	2
(United States) F Froehling (United States) K Kemmer	7	6
(France) P Joly (France) F Guédy	7	2	6
(Soviet Union) V Borisov (Soviet Union) N Chmyreva	6	6	2
(Japan) J Kamiwazumi (Japan) K Sawamatsu	6	6
4	(United States) C Richey (United States) N Gunter	0	0
(France) T Bernasconi (New Zealand) M Pryde	2	6	3
(Soviet Union) S Likhachev (Soviet Union) E Birioukova	6	3	6
(United States) M Estep (Australia) C Doerner	3
(United Kingdom) R Taylor (United Kingdom) F Taylor	1^{r}
(Romania) D Hărădău (Romania) J Gohn	6	6
(France) G Rual (France) S Pruvot	4	4
(United States) S Siegel (United States) L duPont	1	1
1	(France) J-C Barclay (France) F Dürr	6	6

Second round
(Japan) T Sakai (Japan) K Fukuoka
(United States) F Froehling (United States) K Kemmer	w/o
(France) P Joly (France) F Guédy	3	6	3
(Japan) J Kamiwazumi (Japan) K Sawamatsu	6	3	6
(Soviet Union) S Likhachev (Soviet Union) E Birioukova	3	7	7
(United States) M Estep (Australia) C Doerner	6	5	9
(Romania) D Hărădău (Romania) J Gohn	0	1
1	(France) J-C Barclay (France) F Dürr	6	6

Quarterfinals
(United States) F Froehling (United States) K Kemmer	w/o
(Japan) J Kamiwazumi (Japan) K Sawamatsu
(United States) M Estep (Australia) C Doerner	6	5	3
1	(France) J-C Barclay (France) F Dürr	4	7	6

Semifinals
(United States) F Froehling (United States) K Kemmer	4	4
1	(France) J-C Barclay (France) F Dürr	6	6
