= 1972 Wimbledon Championships – Women's singles qualifying =

Women's singles qualifying
- 1972 Wimbledon Championships

Events
Singles	men	women		boys	girls
Doubles	men	women	mixed	boys	girls
WC Singles	men	women	quad
WC Doubles	men	women	quad
Legends	men	women	seniors

Qualification
Singles	men	women
Doubles	men	women	mixed
- Wimbledon Championships

Players who neither had high enough rankings nor received wild cards to enter the main draw of the annual Wimbledon Tennis Championships participated in a qualifying tournament held one week before the event.

== Qualifiers ==
1. (United States) Julie Anthony
2. (United States) Kathy Blake
3. (United Kingdom) Diane Riste
4. (Belgium) Monique Gurdal
5. (United Kingdom) Sue Mappin
6. (United States) Wendy Appleby
7. (United States) Tam O'Shaughnessy

== Qualifying draw ==
Key

- Q = Qualifier
- WC = Wild card
- LL = Lucky loser
- Alt = Alternate
- ITF = ITF entry
- PR = Protected ranking
- SR = Special ranking
- SE = Special exempt
- JE = Junior exempt
- JR = Junior Accelerator Programme entrant
- CO = College Accelerator Programme entrant
- NG = Next Gen Accelerator Program entrant
- w/o = Walkover
- r = Retired
- d = Defaulted

=== First qualifier ===
First round
1	(United States) Julie Anthony	7	6
8	(Italy) Anna-Maria Nasuelli	5	1
4	(Sweden) Mimmi Wikstedt	6	7
5	(Switzerland) Rita Félix	0	5
2	(Republic of Ireland) Geraldine Barniville	6	6
7	(Australia) Jenny Staley Hoad	1	4
3	(United States) Marjory Gengler	1
6	(United Kingdom) Penny Hardgrave	1^{r}

Second round
(United States) Julie Anthony	4	6	6
(Sweden) Mimmi Wikstedt	6	3	0
(Republic of Ireland) Geraldine Barniville	6	6
(United States) Marjory Gengler	4	1

Qualifying competition
(United States) Julie Anthony	6	6
(Republic of Ireland) Geraldine Barniville	4	3

=== Second qualifier ===
First round
1	(United States) Kathy Blake	6	6
8	(United Kingdom) Claire Colman	1	4
4	(United Kingdom) Lindsay Blachford	6	6
5	(New Zealand) C.A. Hunt	1	1
2	(Belgium) Monique Van Haver	6	6
7	(New Zealand) D.H. Turner	0	1
3	(Italy) Rosalba Vido	6	6
6	(United States) M. Cooper	2	4

Second round
(United States) Kathy Blake	6	6
(United Kingdom) Lindsay Blachford	1	4
(Belgium) Monique Van Haver	2	7	6
(Italy) Rosalba Vido	6	5	2

Qualifying competition
(United States) Kathy Blake	6	7
(Belgium) Monique Van Haver	2	5

=== Third qualifier ===
First round
1	(United Kingdom) Diane Riste	6	6
8	(United Kingdom) Denise Staniszewski	2	2
4	(Sweden) Madelaine Pegel	6	6
5	(Australia) Mandy Morgan	3	2
2	(Switzerland) A. Purek	7	2	6
7	(France) Michelle Rodriguez	5	6	1
3	(United States) Roylee Bailey	6	6
6	(New Zealand) Beverley Vercoe	1	4

Second round
(United Kingdom) Diane Riste	6	0
(Sweden) Madelaine Pegel	3	0^{r}
(Switzerland) A. Purek	6	6
(United States) Roylee Bailey	4	1

Qualifying competition
(United Kingdom) Diane Riste	8	3	6
(Switzerland) A. Purek	6	6	3

=== Fourth qualifier ===
First round
1	(Belgium) Monique Gurdal	3	6	8
8	(United Kingdom) Penny Moor	6	1	6
4	(Australia) Janine Whyte	6	2	6
5	(South Africa) Arista Steenkamp	2	6	4
2	(Australia) Sue Hole	3	6	6
7	(United Kingdom) Cherry Panton	6	1	3
3	(United Kingdom) Sandra Okin	6	4	6
6	(Malta) R. Pearson	4	6	1

Second round
(Belgium) Monique Gurdal	6	6
(Australia) Janine Whyte	3	3
(Australia) Sue Hole	3	8	6
(United Kingdom) Sandra Okin	6	6	3

Qualifying competition
(Belgium) Monique Gurdal	8	6	6
(Australia) Sue Hole	9	4	1

=== Fifth qualifier ===
First round
1	(United Kingdom) Sue Mappin	6	6
8	(United Kingdom) K.F. Sturgeon	3	4
4	(United Kingdom) Sally Holdsworth	8	7
5	(United States) Pam Austin	6	5
2	(United Kingdom) Frances Candy	8	6
7	(United States) Susan Vinton	6	4
3	(France) Marie-Christine Brochard	3	6	6
6	(Australia) Marilyn Tesch	6	1	3

Second round
(United Kingdom) Sue Mappin	8	6
(United Kingdom) Sally Holdsworth	6	2
(United Kingdom) Frances Candy	8	7
(France) Marie-Christine Brochard	6	5

Qualifying competition
(United Kingdom) Sue Mappin	6	6
(United Kingdom) Frances Candy	2	0

=== Sixth qualifier ===
First round
1	(United States) Wendy Appleby	8	6	7
8	(Sweden) Margareta Strandberg	9	1	5
4	(United Kingdom) Binnie Blackburn	6	6
5	(United States) Laurie Tenney	3	1
2	(United States) Patty Cody	6	6
7	(United Kingdom) Jane Poynder	4	1
3	(Spain) Carmen Mandarino	6	6
6	(United Kingdom) Elizabeth James	3	3

Second round
(United States) Wendy Appleby	7	7
(United Kingdom) Binnie Blackburn	5	5
(United States) Patty Cody	6	3	6
(Spain) Carmen Mandarino	4	6	4

Qualifying competition
(United States) Wendy Appleby	3	6	6
(United States) Patty Cody	6	1	2

=== Seventh qualifier ===
First round
1	(United States) Tam O'Shaughnessy	6	6
8	(Italy) Monica Giorgi	2	2
4	(United Kingdom) Jenny Helliar	4	6	6
5	(New Zealand) Judy Connor	6	4	2
2	(South Africa) Louise Montgomery	6	4	6
7	(Sweden) Isabelle Larsson	4	6	4
3	(United Kingdom) Wendy Slaughter	6	6
6	(Japan) Naoko Sato	4	2

Second round
(United States) Tam O'Shaughnessy	8	6
(United Kingdom) Jenny Helliar	6	2
(South Africa) Louise Montgomery	2	5
(United Kingdom) Wendy Slaughter	6	7

Qualifying competition
(United States) Tam O'Shaughnessy	6	6
(United Kingdom) Wendy Slaughter	1	2
