= 1973 French Open – Men's doubles =

Men's doubles
- 1973 French Open

Final
- Champion: (Australia) John Newcombe (Netherlands) Tom Okker
- Runner-up: (United States) Jimmy Connors (Romania) Ilie Năstase
- Score: 6–1, 3–6, 6–3, 5–7, 6–4

Details
- Draw: 64
- Seeds: 8

Events
Singles	men	women		boys	girls
Doubles	men	women	mixed	boys	girls
WC Singles	men	women	quad
WC Doubles	men	women	quad
Legends	−45	45+	women
← 1972 ·	French Open	· 1974 →

Bob Hewitt and Frew McMillan were the defending champions but only Frew McMillan competed that year with Bob Carmichael. Bob Carmichael and Frew McMillan lost in the semifinals to John Newcombe and Tom Okker.

John Newcombe and Tom Okker won in the final 6–1, 3–6, 6–3, 5–7, 6–4 against Jimmy Connors and Ilie Năstase.

== Seeds ==
1. (Australia) John Newcombe / (Netherlands) Tom Okker (champions)
2. (Socialist Federal Republic of Yugoslavia) Niki Pilić / (Australia) Allan Stone (first round)
3. (United States) Brian Gottfried / (United States) Dick Stockton (quarterfinals)
4. (South Africa) Cliff Drysdale / (United Kingdom) Roger Taylor (third round)
5. (Australia) Bob Carmichael / (South Africa) Frew McMillan (semifinals)
6. (United States) Jimmy Connors / (Romania) Ilie Năstase (final)
7. (Spain) Manuel Orantes / (Romania) Ion Țiriac (withdrew)
8. (United States) Tom Gorman / (United States) Erik van Dillen (third round)

== Draw ==
=== Key ===
- Q = Qualifier
- WC = Wild card
- LL = Lucky loser
- Alt = Alternate
- ITF = ITF entry
- PR = Protected ranking
- SR = Special ranking
- SE = Special exempt
- JE = Junior exempt
- JR = Junior Accelerator Programme entrant
- CO = College Accelerator Programme entrant
- NG = Next Gen Accelerator Program entrant
- w/o = Walkover
- r = Retired
- d = Defaulted

=== Finals ===
Quarterfinals
(United States) Mike Estep (Australia) Kim Warwick	3	5
(West Germany) Jürgen Fassbender (West Germany) Hans-Jürgen Pohmann	6	7
3	(United States) Brian Gottfried (United States) Dick Stockton	4	6
6	(United States) Jimmy Connors (Romania) Ilie Năstase	6	7
5	(Australia) Bob Carmichael (South Africa) Frew McMillan	6	6
(United States) Jim McManus (Rhodesia) Andrew Pattison	1	1
(United States) Arthur Ashe (Czechoslovakia) Jan Kodeš	4	6	4
1	(Australia) John Newcombe (Netherlands) Tom Okker	6	4	6

Semifinals
(West Germany) Jürgen Fassbender (West Germany) Hans-Jürgen Pohmann	4	6
6	(United States) Jimmy Connors (Romania) Ilie Năstase	6	7
5	(Australia) Bob Carmichael (South Africa) Frew McMillan	4	6
1	(Australia) John Newcombe (Netherlands) Tom Okker	6	7

Final
6	(United States) Jimmy Connors (Romania) Ilie Năstase	1	6	3	7	4
1	(Australia) John Newcombe (Netherlands) Tom Okker	6	3	6	5	6

=== Top half ===
==== Section 1 ====
First round
2	(Socialist Federal Republic of Yugoslavia) N Pilić (Australia) A Stone	4	6
(United States) M Estep (Australia) K Warwick	6	7
(United States) B Seewagen (United States) P Walthall	6	6
(France) M Claitte (France) J Laurent	3	1
(United States) F Froehling (United States) C Pasarell	7	7
(Czechoslovakia) J Hřebec (Czechoslovakia) J Kukal	6	6
(United Kingdom) J Lloyd (United Kingdom) J Paish	7	1
(Greece) N Kelaidis (Japan) J Kuki	5	0^{r}
7	(Spain) M Orantes (Romania) I Țiriac
(Australia) D Carter (Australia) P Kronk	w/o
(France) J-P Meyer (France) B Montrenaud	6	3	6
(South Korea) M-i Kim (South Korea) K-s Bae	0	6	0
(France) J-B Chanfreau (France) G Goven	6	6
(Japan) J Kamiwazumi (Japan) T Sakai	4	4
(Australia) J Alexander (Australia) P Dent	6	4	4
(West Germany) J Fassbender (West Germany) H-J Pohmann	2	6	6

Second round
(United States) M Estep (Australia) K Warwick	7	6
(United States) B Seewagen (United States) P Walthall	5	4
(United States) F Froehling (United States) C Pasarell	6	6
(United Kingdom) J Lloyd (United Kingdom) J Paish	4	0
(Australia) D Carter (Australia) P Kronk	6	7	4
(France) J-P Meyer (France) B Montrenaud	7	6	6
(France) J-B Chanfreau (France) G Goven	3	6
(West Germany) J Fassbender (West Germany) H-J Pohmann	6	7

Third round
(United States) M Estep (Australia) K Warwick	6	7
(United States) F Froehling (United States) C Pasarell	3	5
(France) J-P Meyer (France) B Montrenaud	4	1
(West Germany) J Fassbender (West Germany) H-J Pohmann	6	6

Quarterfinals
(United States) M Estep (Australia) K Warwick	3	5
(West Germany) J Fassbender (West Germany) H-J Pohmann	6	7

==== Section 2 ====
First round
3	(United States) B Gottfried (United States) D Stockton	4	6	8
(Mexico) M Lara (Mexico) R Ramírez	6	2	6
(Italy) E Di Matteo (Italy) A Zugarelli	6	6
(South Korea) HS Chang (South Korea) SC Hwang	0	1
(Japan) K Hirai (Japan) K Tanabe	2	7	6
(Argentina) E Álvarez (Argentina) T Vázquez	6	5	4
(Egypt) I El Shafei (New Zealand) B Fairlie	6	6
(France) P Beust (France) D Contet	4	4
6	(United States) J Connors (Romania) I Năstase	6	6
(France) F Battegay (Mexico) J Loyo Mayo	2	3
(South Africa) B Bertram (Australia) W Lloyd	w/o
(West Germany) A Korpás (West Germany) K Meiler
(Paraguay) V Pecci (Argentina) T Quintin	7	4	6
(Bolivia) E Gorostiaga (Ecuador) E Zuleta	5	6	4
(Colombia) Á Betancur (Socialist Federal Republic of Yugoslavia) D Stojović	3	2
(South Africa) P Cramer (South Africa) R Moore	6	6

Second round
3	(United States) B Gottfried (United States) D Stockton	7	6
(Italy) E Di Matteo (Italy) A Zugarelli	6	3
(Japan) K Hirai (Japan) K Tanabe	6	6
(Egypt) I El Shafei (New Zealand) B Fairlie	7	7
6	(United States) J Connors (Romania) I Năstase	7	7
(South Africa) B Bertram (Australia) W Lloyd	5	6
(Paraguay) V Pecci (Argentina) T Quintin	5	6	5
(South Africa) P Cramer (South Africa) R Moore	7	4	7

Third round
3	(United States) B Gottfried (United States) D Stockton	4	7	18
(Egypt) I El Shafei (New Zealand) B Fairlie	6	6	16
6	(United States) J Connors (Romania) I Năstase	7	6
(South Africa) P Cramer (South Africa) R Moore	5	2

Quarterfinals
3	(United States) B Gottfried (United States) D Stockton	4	6
6	(United States) J Connors (Romania) I Năstase	6	7

=== Bottom half ===
==== Section 3 ====
First round
(France) P Barthès (France) F Jauffret	6	6
(Soviet Union) Vadim Borisov (Romania) V Marcu	4	2
(Czechoslovakia) M Holeček (New Zealand) O Parun	3	4
(Colombia) I Molina (Colombia) J Velasco	6	6
(United States) S Faulk (United States) P Gerken	7	6
(Greece) N Kalogeropoulos (Brazil) JE Mandarino	5	3
(Belgium) P Hombergen (Belgium) B Mignot	3	4
5	(Australia) B Carmichael (South Africa) F McMillan	6	6
(France) J Bergmann (Mexico) E Montaño	7	7
(France) É Deblicker (France) J Thamin	5	5
(United States) J McManus (Rhodesia) A Pattison	6	6
(Italy) P Bertolucci (Italy) A Panatta	4	4
(Mexico) R Chávez (Chile) P Rodríguez	4	6
(Argentina) R Cano (Argentina) G Vilas	6	7
(Australia) J Moore (Australia) G Perkins
4	(South Africa) C Drysdale (United Kingdom) R Taylor	w/o

Second round
(France) P Barthès (France) F Jauffret	1	3
(Colombia) I Molina (Colombia) J Velasco	6	6
(United States) S Faulk (United States) P Gerken	3	1
5	(Australia) B Carmichael (South Africa) F McMillan	6	6
(France) J Bergmann (Mexico) E Montaño	3	5
(United States) J McManus (Rhodesia) A Pattison	6	7
(Argentina) R Cano (Argentina) G Vilas	2	3
4	(South Africa) C Drysdale (United Kingdom) R Taylor	6	6

Third round
(Colombia) I Molina (Colombia) J Velasco	5	7	4
5	(Australia) B Carmichael (South Africa) F McMillan	7	6	6
(United States) J McManus (Rhodesia) A Pattison	6	6	7
4	(South Africa) C Drysdale (United Kingdom) R Taylor	4	7	5

Quarterfinals
5	(Australia) B Carmichael (South Africa) F McMillan	6	6
(United States) J McManus (Rhodesia) A Pattison	1	1

==== Section 4 ====
First round
(United States) A Ashe (Czechoslovakia) J Kodeš	w/o
(France) T Bernasconi (France) P Joly
(France) P Dominguez (France) W N'Godrella	w/o
(West Germany) H Elschenbroich (West Germany) U Pinner
(United States) H Lofty (United States) G Marsten	0	0
(Sweden) B Borg (Sweden) K Johansson	6	6
(United Kingdom) G Battrick (Australia) B Phillips-Moore	1	4
8	(United States) T Gorman (United States) E van Dillen	6	6
(United States) E Dibbs (United States) H Solomon	w/o
(United Kingdom) M Farrell (United Kingdom) D Lloyd
(Soviet Union) S Likhachev (Soviet Union) A Metreveli	6	6
(Australia) R Case (Australia) G Masters	3	3
(Romania) D Hărădău (Romania) T Ovici	3	7	0
(Chile) P Cornejo (Chile) J Fillol	6	5	6
(United States) J Lacey (Japan) K Shimamura	0	1
1	(Australia) J Newcombe (Netherlands) T Okker	6	6

Second round
(United States) A Ashe (Czechoslovakia) J Kodeš	7	6
(France) P Dominguez (France) W N'Godrella	5	4
(Sweden) B Borg (Sweden) K Johansson	4	1
8	(United States) T Gorman (United States) E van Dillen	6	6
(United States) E Dibbs (United States) H Solomon	6	4	1
(Soviet Union) S Likhachev (Soviet Union) A Metreveli	2	6	6
(Chile) P Cornejo (Chile) J Fillol	2	1
1	(Australia) J Newcombe (Netherlands) T Okker	6	6

Third round
(United States) A Ashe (Czechoslovakia) J Kodeš	6	6
8	(United States) T Gorman (United States) E van Dillen	3	0
(Soviet Union) S Likhachev (Soviet Union) A Metreveli	4	6	2
1	(Australia) J Newcombe (Netherlands) T Okker	6	4	6

Quarterfinals
(United States) A Ashe (Czechoslovakia) J Kodeš	4	6	4
1	(Australia) J Newcombe (Netherlands) T Okker	6	4	6
