= 1972 French Open – Women's singles qualifying =

Women's singles qualifying
- 1972 French Open

Events
| Singles | men | women | | boys | girls |
| Doubles | men | women | mixed | boys | girls |
| WC Singles | men | women | quad |
| WC Doubles | men | women | quad |
| Legends | −45 | 45+ | women |

Qualification
| Singles | men | women |
- French Open

Players who neither had high enough rankings nor received wild cards to enter the main draw of the annual French Open Tennis Championships participated in a qualifying tournament held in the week before the event.

== Qualifiers ==
1. (Belgium) Michèle Gurdal
2. (Colombia) Isabel Fernández de Soto
3. (United States) Nancy Ornstein
4. (United States) Anne Guerrant
5. (Hungary) Erzsébet Széll
6. (United States) Barbara Downs
7. (Austria) Sonja Pachta
8. (United States) Laura duPont

== Lucky losers ==
1. (Chile) Ana María Arias
2. (Soviet Union) Marina Chuvirina

== Qualifying draw ==
Key

- Q = Qualifier
- WC = Wild card
- LL = Lucky loser
- Alt = Alternate
- ITF = ITF entry
- PR = Protected ranking
- SR = Special ranking
- SE = Special exempt
- JE = Junior exempt
- JR = Junior Accelerator Programme entrant
- CO = College Accelerator Programme entrant
- NG = Next Gen Accelerator Program entrant
- w/o = Walkover
- r = Retired
- d = Defaulted

=== First qualifier ===
First round
1 | (Belgium) Michèle Gurdal | 6 | 1 | 8
8 | (Australia) Barbara Hawcroft | 2 | 6 | 6

Second round
(Belgium) Michèle Gurdal | 6 | 6
(France) Janine Mauroy-Toffier | 3 | 3
(Sweden) Madeleine Pegel
(France) Danièle Bouteleux | w/o

Qualifying competition
(Belgium) Michèle Gurdal | 6 | 6
(Sweden) Madeleine Pegel | 4 | 0

=== Second qualifier ===
First round
4 | (France) Jacqueline Le Boubenec | 6 | 6
5 | (United States) Shari Barman | 0 | 3
2 | (France) Florence Guédy | 6 | 3 | 6
7 | (Ecuador) María Eugenia Guzmán | 2 | 6 | 1

Second round
(Colombia) Isabel Fernández de Soto | 6 | 6
(France) Jacqueline Le Boubenec | 1 | 3
(France) Florence Guédy | 0 | 6 | 6
(Italy) Daniela Porzio | 6 | 3 | 4

Qualifying competition
(Colombia) Isabel Fernández de Soto | 6 | 6
(France) Florence Guédy | 1 | 0

=== Third qualifier ===
First round
1 | (Chile) Ana María Arias | 6 | 6
8 | (United States) Lucinda Crosby | 0 | 1
2 | (United States) Nancy Ornstein | 6 | 6
7 | (France) Claudine Rouire | 3 | 1

Second round
(Chile) Ana María Arias | 6 | 2 | 6
(France) Dominique Beillan | 4 | 6 | 1
(United States) Nancy Ornstein | 6 | 6
(France) Christiane Sarrazin | 0 | 1

Qualifying competition
(Chile) Ana María Arias | 2 | 6 | 2
(United States) Nancy Ornstein | 6 | 4 | 6

=== Fourth qualifier ===
First round
4 | (Australia) Wendy Turnbull | 4 | 7 | 6
5 | (France) Rosie Reyes | 6 | 5 | 1

Second round
(United States) Anne Guerrant | 4 | 8 | 6
(Australia) Wendy Turnbull | 6 | 6 | 3
(United States) Pamela Austin | 6 | 6
(France) Sylvie Pruvot | 2 | 0

Qualifying competition
(United States) Anne Guerrant | 6 | 6
(United States) Pamela Austin | 2 | 4

=== Fifth qualifier ===
First round
4 | (Italy) Rosalba Vido | 7 | 6
5 | (Argentina) Raquel Giscafré | 5 | 3
2 | (Australia) Fay Toyne | 6 | 6
7 | (France) Marie-Christine Brochard | 4 | 2

Second round
(Hungary) Erzsébet Széll | 12 | 6
(Italy) Rosalba Vido | 10 | 3
(Australia) Fay Toyne | 6 | 6
(United States) J. Turner | 0 | 3

Qualifying competition
(Hungary) Erzsébet Széll | 6 | 6
(Australia) Fay Toyne | 1 | 3

=== Sixth qualifier ===
First round
1 | (Chile) Michelle Rodríguez | 7 | 6
8 | (Japan) Yoshiro Tanaka | 5 | 1
2 | (United States) Barbara Downs | 8 | 6
7 | (Italy) Anna-Maria Nasuelli | 6 | 3
3 | (Belgium) Monique Van Haver | 10 | 6
6 | (Indonesia) Lany Kaligis | 8 | 2

Second round
(Chile) Michelle Rodríguez | 6 | 2 | 6
(France) Anne-Marie Rouchon | 4 | 6 | 3
(United States) Barbara Downs | 7 | 6
(Belgium) Monique Van Haver | 5 | 3

Qualifying competition
(Chile) Michelle Rodríguez | 6 | 3 | 3
(United States) Barbara Downs | 1 | 6 | 6

=== Seventh qualifier ===
First round
1 | (United States) Kristien Shaw | 6 | 7
8 | (Spain) Carmen Mandarino | 3 | 5

Second round
(United States) Kristien Shaw | 3 | 6 | 3
(Austria) Sonja Pachta | 6 | 3 | 6
(Soviet Union) Marina Chuvirina | 6 | 6
(Austria) Maria Hollingsworth | 0 | 1

Qualifying competition
(Austria) Sonja Pachta | 6 | 4 | 6
(Soviet Union) Marina Chuvirina | 4 | 6 | 1

=== Eighth qualifier ===
First round
4 | (Italy) Monica Giorgi | 6 | 4 | 6
5 | (United States) Kathy Blake | 2 | 6 | 2
2 | (New Zealand) Marilyn Pryde | 6 | 6
7 | (Uruguay) Lucia Sarno | 3 | 0
3 | (United States) Laura duPont | 6 | 6
6 | (Switzerland) Ingrid Sadlon | 4 | 1

Second round
(France) Johanne Venturino | 3 | 6 | 6
(Italy) Monica Giorgi | 6 | 2 | 4
(New Zealand) Marilyn Pryde | 6 | 8 | 0
(United States) Laura duPont | 2 | 10 | 6

Qualifying competition
(France) Johanne Venturino | 1 | 3
(United States) Laura duPont | 6 | 6
