= 1973 French Open – Men's singles =

Tennis tournament

Men's singles
- 1973 French Open

Final
- Champion: (Romania) Ilie Năstase
- Runner-up: (Socialist Federal Republic of Yugoslavia) Nikola Pilić
- Score: 6–3, 6–3, 6–0

Details
- Draw: 128
- Seeds: 16

Events
Singles	men	women		boys	girls
Doubles	men	women	mixed	boys	girls
WC Singles	men	women	quad
WC Doubles	men	women	quad
Legends	−45	45+	women
- French Open

Ilie Năstase defeated Nikola Pilić in the final, 6–3, 6–3, 6–0 to win the men's singles tennis title at the 1973 French Open. It was his second and last major singles title, after the 1972 US Open. Năstase did not lose a set during the tournament.

Andrés Gimeno was the defending champion, but lost in the second round to Guillermo Vilas.

The first two rounds were played in a best-of-three sets format.

This was the first major appearance for future world No. 1, six-time French Open champion, and eleven-time major champion Björn Borg; he lost in the fourth round to Adriano Panatta.

== Seeds ==
The seeded players are listed below. Ilie Năstase is the champion; others show the round in which they were eliminated.

1. (United States) Stan Smith (fourth round)
2. (Romania) Ilie Năstase (champion)
3. n/a
4. (United States) Arthur Ashe (fourth round)
5. (Spain) Manuel Orantes (second round)
6. (Australia) John Newcombe (first round)
7. (Spain) Andrés Gimeno (second round)
8. (Italy) Adriano Panatta (semifinals)
9. (United States) Cliff Richey (first round)
10. (United Kingdom) Roger Taylor (quarterfinals)
11. (France) Patrick Proisy (first round)
12. (United States) Jimmy Connors (first round)
13. (United Kingdom) Mark Cox (second round)
14. (Czechoslovakia) Jan Kodeš (quarterfinals)
15. (France) François Jauffret (fourth round)
16. (Netherlands) Tom Okker (quarterfinals)

== Draw ==
=== Key ===
- Q = Qualifier
- WC = Wild card
- LL = Lucky loser
- r = Retired

=== Finals ===
Quarterfinals
2	(Romania) Ilie Năstase	6	6	7
10	(United Kingdom) Roger Taylor	0	2	6
14	(Czechoslovakia) Jan Kodeš	4	6	6	1
(United States) Tom Gorman	6	7	4	6
(Socialist Federal Republic of Yugoslavia) Nikola Pilić	6	6	3	6
(Italy) Paolo Bertolucci	3	4	6	4
8	(Italy) Adriano Panatta	6	5	6	6
16	(Netherlands) Tom Okker	3	7	3	4

Semifinals
2	(Romania) Ilie Năstase	6	6	6
(United States) Tom Gorman	3	4	1
(Socialist Federal Republic of Yugoslavia) Nikola Pilić	6	6	6
8	(Italy) Adriano Panatta	4	3	2

Final
2	(Romania) Ilie Năstase	6	6	6
(Socialist Federal Republic of Yugoslavia) Nikola Pilić	3	3	0

=== Top half ===
==== Section 1 ====
First round
2	(Romania) I Năstase	6	6
(Chile) J Pinto-Bravo	1	4
(Japan) T Sakai	2	3
(Czechoslovakia) J Hřebec	6	6
(West Germany) J Fassbender	6	1	6
Q	(France) D Naegelen	2	6	1
(Mexico) M Lara	7	6
Q	(France) P Joly	6	1
15	(France) Jauffret	7	6
(Egypt) I El Shafei	6	3
(Italy) A Zugarelli	7	3	3
(Socialist Federal Republic of Yugoslavia) Z Franulović	5	6	6
(West Germany) K Meiler	4	2
(United Kingdom) G Battrick	6	6
(United States) E Dibbs	5	5
(France) P Dominguez	7	7

Second round
2	(Romania) I Năstase	6	6
(Czechoslovakia) J Hřebec	2	4
(West Germany) J Fassbender	6	7
(Mexico) M Lara	3	6
15	(France) F Jauffret	6	7
(Socialist Federal Republic of Yugoslavia) Z Franulović	4	6
(United Kingdom) G Battrick	6	4
(France) P Dominguez	7	6

Third round
2	(Romania) I Năstase	6	6	6
(West Germany) J Fassbender	2	1	3
15	(France) F Jauffret	6	2	6	3	6
(France) P Dominguez	1	6	1	6	0

Fourth round
2	(Romania) I Năstase	6	6	6
15	(France) F Jauffret	4	2	4

==== Section 2 ====
First round
7	(Spain) A Gimeno	6	6	6
(Italy) E Di Matteo	7	4	3
LL	(West Germany) A Korpás	4	0
(Argentina) G Vilas	6	6
Q	(France) É Deblicker	4	2
(United States) P Gerken	6	6
Q	(United States) S Siegel	2	6
(Denmark) T Ulrich	6	7
10	(United Kingdom) R Taylor	6	3	6
Q	(Australia) K Warwick	1	6	3
(Sweden) K Johansson	5	4
(Soviet Union) A Metreveli	7	6
LL	(United States) S Stewart	4	0
(United States) C Pasarell	6	6
(West Germany) H Elschenbroich	7	6
(Hungary) P Szőke	6	2

Second round
7	(Spain) A Gimeno	2	7	6
(Argentina) G Vilas	6	5	8
(United States) P Gerken	6	6
(Denmark) T Ulrich	2	3
10	(United Kingdom) R Taylor	6	6
(Soviet Union) A Metreveli	4	4
(United States) C Pasarell	6	6
(West Germany) H Elschenbroich	0	3

Third round
(Argentina) G Vilas	1	6	1
(United States) P Gerken	6	7	6
10	(United Kingdom) R Taylor	6	4	3	6	7
(United States) C Pasarell	2	6	6	3	5

Fourth round
(United States) P Gerken	4	4	6	7	4
10	(United Kingdom) R Taylor	6	6	3	6	6

==== Section 3 ====
First round
(Socialist Federal Republic of Yugoslavia) B Jovanović	5	7	6
Q	(Japan) J Kuki	7	5	3
(Czechoslovakia) F Pála	6	6
Q	(Soviet Union) S Likhachev	4	3
Q	(Mexico) E Montaño	7	4	0
(Italy) C Barazzutti	6	6	6
(Japan) J Kamiwazumi	6	6
Q	(Mexico) R Chávez	3	4
14	(Czechoslovakia) J Kodeš	4	6	6
(New Zealand) B Fairlie	6	2	1
(South Africa) P Cramer	3	7	6
(Australia) D Crealy	6	6	2
(Australia) C Dibley	6	6
(France) D Contet	0	1
(Chile) P Cornejo	6	4	2
(Poland) T Nowicki	3	6	6

Second round
(Socialist Federal Republic of Yugoslavia) B Jovanović	6	4	9
(Czechoslovakia) F Pála	1	6	7
(Italy) C Barazzutti	6	6
(Japan) J Kamiwazumi	2	1
14	(Czechoslovakia) J Kodeš	6	6
(South Africa) P Cramer	1	0
(Australia) C Dibley	6	6
(Poland) T Nowicki	4	4

Third round
(Socialist Federal Republic of Yugoslavia) B Jovanović	6	6	7
(Italy) C Barazzutti	2	1	5
14	(Czechoslovakia) J Kodeš	6	6	1	6
(Australia) C Dibley	3	4	6	1

Fourth round
(Socialist Federal Republic of Yugoslavia) B Jovanović	6	3	6	0	5
14	(Czechoslovakia) J Kodeš	4	6	4	6	7

==== Section 4 ====
First round
6	(Australia) J Newcombe	5	1
(Czechoslovakia) M Holeček	7	6
(Colombia) I Molina	5	6	1
(United Kingdom) J Paish	7	1	6
(West Germany) H Pohmann	6	6
(India) A Amritraj	4	2
(United States) J Borowiak	6	6
LL	(France) J-L Haillet	7	7
11	(France) P Proisy	7	3	1
(United States) T Gorman	6	6	6
(Australia) A Stone	6	6	6
Q	(Argentina) T Vázquez	7	4	8
(Soviet Union) T Kakoulia	4	3
(New Zealand) O Parun	6	6
(Czechoslovakia) V Zednik	w/o
(Australia) M Mulligan

Second round
(Czechoslovakia) M Holeček	7	6
(United Kingdom) J Paish	6	4
(West Germany) H Pohmann	6	6
LL	(France) J-L Haillet	2	4
(United States) T Gorman	6	6
Q	(Argentina) T Vázquez	3	3
(New Zealand) O Parun	6	7
(Australia) M Mulligan	4	5

Third round
(Czechoslovakia) M Holeček	6	3	6	4	8
(West Germany) H Pohmann	4	6	0	6	6
(United States) T Gorman	6	6	6
(New Zealand) O Parun	4	3	3

Fourth round
(Czechoslovakia) M Holeček	3	3	4
(United States) T Gorman	6	6	6

=== Bottom half ===
==== Section 5 ====
First round
(Colombia) J Velasco Sr.	4	4
Q	(United Kingdom) J. Lloyd	6	6
Q	(Hungary) G Varga	4	4
(Socialist Federal Republic of Yugoslavia) N Pilić	6	6
(Australia) P Dent	6	6
(United States) S Faulk	2	4
(Mexico) R Ramírez	6	7
12	(United States) J Connors	4	6
(Romania) I Țiriac	7	6
(Belgium) P Hombergen	5	1
(Italy) N Pietrangeli	0	1
(United States) F Froehling	6	6
(France) W N'Godrella
(United States) T Edlefsen	w/o
Q	(Australia) B. Lloyd	3	4
5	(Spain) M Orantes	6	6

Second round
Q	(United Kingdom) J. Lloyd	1	7	0
(Socialist Federal Republic of Yugoslavia) N Pilić	6	6	6
(Australia) P Dent	6	6
(Mexico) R Ramírez	2	1
(Romania) I Țiriac	6	6
(United States) F Froehling	7	7
(France) W N'Godrella	6	7
5	(Spain) M Orantes	0	6

Third round
(Socialist Federal Republic of Yugoslavia) N Pilić	3	7	7	6
(Australia) P Dent	6	5	6	3
(United States) F Froehling	6	6	6
(France) W N'Godrella	4	3	4

Fourth round
(Socialist Federal Republic of Yugoslavia) N Pilić	6	6	6
(United States) F Froehling	2	2	3

==== Section 6 ====
First round
(France) J-L Rouyer	7	1	6
(Greece) N Kalogeropoulos	6	6	3
(Rhodesia) A Pattison	6	6
(United Kingdom) G Stilwell	2	3
(Mexico) J Loyo-Mayo	4	1
(Italy) P Bertolucci	6	6
(Australia) I Fletcher	4	1
13	(United Kingdom) M Cox	6	6
(United States) H Solomon	3	6	6
(South Africa) F McMillan	6	2	3
(Czechoslovakia) J Kukal	6	4	2
(United States) B Gottfried	2	6	6
(Socialist Federal Republic of Yugoslavia) N Špear	6	4	5
(Australia) G Masters	1	6	7
(Hungary) I Gulyás	4	4
4	(United States) A Ashe	6	6

Second round
(France) J-L Rouyer	5	4
(Rhodesia) A Pattison	7	6
(Italy) P Bertolucci	7	6
13	(United Kingdom) M Cox	5	2
(United States) H Solomon	6	6
(United States) B Gottfried	4	2
(Australia) G Masters	5	2
4	(United States) A Ashe	7	6

Third round
(Rhodesia) A Pattison	6	4	7	4	4
(Italy) P Bertolucci	3	6	6	6	6
(United States) H Solomon	6	2	7	4
4	(United States) A Ashe	7	6	6	6

Fourth round
(Italy) P Bertolucci	7	6	6
4	(United States) A Ashe	6	3	4

==== Section 7 ====
First round
(France) J-B Chanfreau	6	5	7
(Austria) H Kary	4	7	5
(Spain) A Muñoz	0	2
(United States) D Stockton	6	6
(Australia) J Alexander	3	4
(France) P Barthès	6	6
(Sweden) B Borg	6	6
9	(United States) C Richey	2	3
(United States) M Estep	6	6
(Poland) M Rybarczyk	3	3
(Greece) N Kelaidis	2	2
(Chile) J Fillol Sr.	6	6
(Australia) R Case	1	3
(Belgium) B Mignot	6	6
(Australia) B Carmichael	2	4
8	(Italy) A Panatta	6	6

Second round
(France) J-B Chanfreau	4	4
(United States) D Stockton	6	6
(France) P Barthès	6	1	6
(Sweden) B Borg	3	6	8
(United States) M Estep	3	6
(Chile) J Fillol Sr.	6	7
(Belgium) B Mignot	1	6	6
8	(Italy) A Panatta	6	1	8

Third round
(United States) D Stockton	7	5	2	6
(Sweden) B Borg	6	7	6	7
(Chile) J Fillol Sr.	4	4	1
8	(Italy) A Panatta	6	6	6

Fourth round
(Sweden) B Borg	6	6	5	6
8	(Italy) A Panatta	7	2	7	7

==== Section 8 ====
First round
Q	(Australia) P Kronk	3	4
(Australia) B Phillips-Moore	6	6
(Hungary) S Baranyi	6	3	6
(South Africa) R Moore	4	6	3
Q	(Romania) T Ovici	6	2	1
(Hungary) R Machán	3	6	6
(Argentina) J Ganzabal	1	1
16	(Netherlands) T Okker	6	6
(United Kingdom) D. Lloyd	4	2
(United States) E Van Dillen	6	6
(South Africa) C Drysdale	6	4	6
Q	(Italy) P Toci	3	6	1
(France) J-C Barclay	4	6
(United States) J McManus	6	7
(France) G Goven	6	1	3
1	(United States) S Smith	2	6	6

Second round
(Australia) B Phillips-Moore	7	6
(Hungary) S Baranyi	6	2
(Hungary) R Machán	5	3
16	(Netherlands) T Okker	7	6
(United States) E Van Dillen	6	3	6
(South Africa) C Drysdale	1	6	4
(United States) J McManus	5	5
1	(United States) S Smith	7	7

Third round
(Australia) B Phillips-Moore	2	1	2
16	(Netherlands) T Okker	6	6	6
(United States) E Van Dillen	2	4	7	6	1
1	(United States) S Smith	6	6	6	4	6

Fourth round
16	(Netherlands) T Okker	6	3	7	3	6
1	(United States) S Smith	3	6	6	6	4

Preceded by 1973 Australian Open – Men's singles	Grand Slam men's singles	Succeeded by 1973 Wimbledon Championships – Men's singles
