= Barbara Brankovska =

Canadian tennis player (born 1952)

- Country (sports): Canada
- Born: September 25, 1952 (age 72)

Singles
- Career record: 1–2 (Federation Cup)

Grand Slam singles results
- Wimbledon: Q2 (1973)

Doubles
- Career record: 2–0 (Federation Cup)

Barbara Brankovska (born September 25, 1952) is a Canadian former professional tennis player.

Originally from Czechoslovakia, Brankovska played Federation Cup tennis for her adopted country in 1976 and 1977, featuring in five ties. Her career also included qualifying draw appearances at Wimbledon and a second round appearance at the 1976 Canadian Open.

== See also ==
- List of Canada Fed Cup team representatives
