= Tennis at the 1970 Summer Universiade =

Tennis events were contested at the 1970 Summer Universiade in Turin, Italy.

== Medal summary ==
Event	Gold	Silver	Bronze
Men's Singles	Patrick Proisy (FRA)	Toomas Leius (URS)	Franco Bartoni (ITA)
Men's Doubles	Jun Kamiwazumi and Toshiro Sakai (JPN)	Toomas Leius and Anatoli Volkov (URS)	Fred McNair and Charlie Owens (USA)
Women's Singles	Tiiu Parmas (URS)	Kazuko Sawamatsu (JPN)	Odile de Roubin (FRA)
Women's Doubles	Ada Bakker and Tine Zwaan (NED)	Junko Sawamatsu and Kazuko Sawamatsu (JPN)	Tiiu Parmas and Mariya Sobol (URS)
Mixed Doubles	Tiiu Parmas and Toomas Leius (URS)	Janet Young and Geoff Pollard (AUS)	Anna Schallau and Charlie Owens (USA)

== Medal table ==
Rank	Nation	Gold	Silver	Bronze	Total
1	Soviet Union (URS)	2	2	1	5
2	Japan (JPN)	1	2	0	3
3	France (FRA)	1	0	1	2
4	Netherlands (NED)	1	0	0	1
5	Australia (AUS)	0	1	0	1
6	United States (USA)	0	0	2	2
7	Italy (ITA)	0	0	1	1
Totals (7 entries)		5	5	5	15

== See also ==
- Tennis at the Summer Universiade
