= 1975 Japan Open Tennis Championships =

- Date: 2–8 November
- Edition: 3rd
- Category: Grand Prix (Grade AA)
- Draw: 64S/32D
- Prize money: $100,000
- Surface: Hard / outdoor
- Location: Tokyo, Japan
- Venue: Denen Coliseum

Champions

Men's singles
- (Mexico) Raúl Ramírez

Women's singles
- (Japan) Kazuko Sawamatsu

Men's doubles
- (United States) Brian Gottfried / (Mexico) Raúl Ramírez
- Japan Open

The 1975 Japan Open Tennis Championships was a combined men's and women's tennis tournament played on hard courts. The men's events were part of the 1975 Commercial Union Assurance Grand Prix and took place at the Denen Coliseum in Tokyo, Japan. The tournament was held from 2 November through 8 November 1975. Raúl Ramírez and Kazuko Sawamatsu won the singles titles.

== Finals ==
=== Men's singles ===
(Mexico) Raúl Ramírez defeated (Spain) Manuel Orantes 6–4, 7–5, 6–3

- It was Ramirez' 4th singles title of the year and the 7th of his career.

=== Women's singles ===
(Japan) Kazuko Sawamatsu defeated (United States) Ann Kiyomura 6–2, 3–6, 6–1

- It was Sawamatsu's 1st singles title of the year and the 2nd and last of his career.

=== Men's doubles ===
(United States) Brian Gottfried / (Mexico) Raúl Ramírez defeated (Spain) Juan Gisbert Sr. / (Spain) Manuel Orantes, 7–6, 6–4

=== Women's doubles ===
(United States) Ann Kiyomura / (Japan) Kazuko Sawamatsu defeated (Japan) Kayoko Fukuoka / (Japan) Kiyomi Nomura 6–2, 6–3
