= 1973 New Zealand Open =

- Date: 8–14 January
- Edition: 6th
- Category: Independent
- Draw: 32S / 16D
- Surface: Grass /outdoor
- Location: Auckland, New Zealand
- Venue: Stanley Street

Champions

Men's singles
- (New Zealand) Onny Parun

Women's singles
- (Australia) Evonne Goolagong

Men's doubles
- (Australia) Brian Fairlie / (Australia) Allan Stone

Women's doubles
- (Australia) Evonne Goolagong / (Australia) Janet Young

Mixed doubles
- (Australia) Evonne Goolagong / (Australia) Ross Case
- ATP Auckland Open

The 1973 New Zealand Open, also known as Benson and Hedges Open for sponsorship reasons, was a combined men's and women's professional tennis tournament held at the Stanley Street grounds in Auckland, New Zealand. It was an independent event, i.e. not part of the 1973 Grand Prix or 1973 World Championship Tennis circuit. It was the sixth edition of the tournament and was played on outdoor grass courts and was held from 8 to 14 January 1973. Onny Parun and Evonne Goolagong won the singles titles.

== Finals ==
=== Men's singles ===
(New Zealand) Onny Parun defeated (France) Patrick Proisy 4–6, 6–7, 6–2, 6–0, 7–6

=== Women's singles ===
(Australia) Evonne Goolagong defeated (Australia) Marilyn Pryde 6–0, 6–1

=== Men's doubles ===
(Australia) Brian Fairlie / (Australia) Allan Stone

=== Women's doubles ===
(Australia) Evonne Goolagong / (Australia) Janet Young defeated (Australia) Pat Coleman / (Australia) Marilyn Tesch 6–1, 6–3

=== Mixed doubles ===
(Australia) Evonne Goolagong / (Australia) Ross Case defeated (Australia) Janet Young / (Australia) Dick Crealy 6–1, 6–3
