= Steve Faulk =

American tennis player

- Country (sports): United States
- Born: 1 June 1947 (age 79) New Orleans, Louisiana

Singles
- Career record: 33–61
- Highest ranking: No. 107 (Oct 15, 1973)

Grand Slam singles results
- French Open: 1R (1973, 1974)
- Wimbledon: Q3 (1972)
- US Open: 1R (1971, 1972)

Doubles
- Career record: 11–30

Grand Slam doubles results
- French Open: 2R (1973)
- Wimbledon: 1R (1974)
- US Open: 1R (1971)

Steve Faulk (born June 1, 1947) is an American former professional tennis player.

Faulk, a New Orleans native, played collegiate tennis for Louisiana State University and was SEC champion at No. 1 singles in 1970. He was a three-time first team All-SEC and in 1970 became the first LSU player to be an All-American.

Active on the ILTF Circuit in the 1960s he won the Gulf State Championships in 1961, then on the professional tour in the 1970s, Faulk featured in singles main draws at the French Open and US Open, as well as in doubles at Wimbledon. He was runner-up to Onny Parun at the Auckland tennis championship in 1972.
