= Odile de Roubin =

French tennis player

- Full name: Odile de Roubin
- Country (sports): France
- Born: 28 September 1948 (age 76)

Singles

Grand Slam singles results
- French Open: QF (1973)
- Wimbledon: 2R (1975)

Doubles

Grand Slam doubles results
- French Open: 1R (1970, 71, 72, 73, 74)
- Wimbledon: 1R (1971, 1972, 1973)
Medal record
Women's Tennis
Summer Universiade
Bronze medal – third place	1970 Turin	Singles

Odile de Roubin (born 28 September 1948) is a former professional tennis player from France.

== Biography ==
As a junior, de Roubin won the girls' singles title at the 1966 French Championships.

During the 1970s she competed on the professional tour, making regular appearances at the French Open and Wimbledon Championships. Her best performance came at the 1973 French Open, where she won her way through to the quarter-finals, beating third seed Virginia Wade en route. She also toppled the third seed at the 1975 French Open, American player Julie Heldman.

She represented France in three editions of the Federation Cup, in 1970, 1973 and 1974, for a total of 11 ties.

== See also ==
- List of France Fed Cup team representatives
