= 1973 French Open =

- Date: 21 May – 3 June 1973
- Edition: 72
- Category: 43rd Grand Slam (ITF)
- Surface: Clay / outdoor
- Location: Paris (XVI^{e}), France
- Venue: Stade Roland Garros

Champions

Men's singles
- (Romania) Ilie Năstase

Women's singles
- (Australia) Margaret Court

Men's doubles
- (Australia) John Newcombe / (Netherlands) Tom Okker

Women's doubles
- (Australia) Margaret Court / (United Kingdom) Virginia Wade

Mixed doubles
- (France) Françoise Dürr / (France) Jean-Claude Barclay
← 1972 ·	French Open	· 1974 →

The 1973 French Open was a tennis tournament that took place on the outdoor clay courts at the Stade Roland Garros in Paris, France. The tournament ran from 21 May until 3 June. It was the 72nd staging of the French Open, and the second Grand Slam tennis event of 1973. Ilie Năstase and Margaret Court won the singles titles.

== Finals ==
=== Men's singles ===
(Romania) Ilie Năstase (Note: Năstase did not lose a set during the entire tournament.) defeated (Socialist Federal Republic of Yugoslavia) Nikola Pilić, 6–3, 6–3, 6–0

• It was Năstase's 2nd and last career Grand Slam singles title and his 1st and only title at the French Open.

=== Women's singles ===
(Australia) Margaret Court defeated (United States) Chris Evert, (Note: This was Evert's first Grand Slam singles final.) 6–7, 7–6, 6–4

• It was Court's 23rd career Grand Slam singles title, her 10th in the Open Era and her 5th and last title at the French Open.

=== Men's doubles ===
(Australia) John Newcombe / (Netherlands) Tom Okker defeated (United States) Jimmy Connors / (Romania) Ilie Năstase, 6–1, 3–6, 6–3, 5–7, 6–4

• It was Newcombe's 14th career Grand Slam doubles title and his 3rd and last title at the French Open.
• It was Okker's 1st career Grand Slam doubles title and his 1st and only title at the French Open.

=== Women's doubles ===
(Australia) Margaret Court / (United Kingdom) Virginia Wade defeated (France) Françoise Dürr / (Netherlands) Betty Stöve, 6–2, 6–3

• It was Court's 17th career Grand Slam doubles title, her 8th during the Open Era and her 4th and last title at the French Open.
• It was Wade's 2nd career Grand Slam doubles title and her 1st and only title at the French Open.

=== Mixed doubles ===
(France) Françoise Dürr / (France) Jean-Claude Barclay defeated (Netherlands) Betty Stöve / (France) Patrice Dominguez, 6–1, 6–4

• It was Dürr's 3rd career Grand Slam mixed doubles title and her 3rd and last title at the French Open.
• It was Barclay's 3rd and last career Grand Slam mixed doubles title and his 3rd title at the French Open.

== Prize money ==
Event		W	F	SF	QF	4R	3R	2R	1R
Singles	Men	FF70,000	FF40,000	FF20,000	FF10,000	FF5,500	FF3,500	FF1,500	FF650
Singles	Women	FF25,000	FF14,000	FF7,500	FF3,500	-	FF2,000	FF1,200	FF650

Total prize money for the event was FF600,100.

== Notes ==
Preceded by 1973 Australian Open	Grand Slams	Succeeded by 1973 Wimbledon Championships
