= Judy Dixon =

American tennis player and coach

- Country (sports): United States
- Born: August 16, 1949 (age 76)

Singles

Grand Slam singles results
- Wimbledon: 1R (1973)
- US Open: 2R (1968)

Doubles

Grand Slam doubles results
- Wimbledon: 1R (1968)
- US Open: 1R (1969)

Judy Dixon (born August 16, 1949) is an American tennis player and collegiate tennis coach, known as a "pioneer" in women's athletics for being the first person to sue a major university for sex discrimination under Title IX.

== Early life ==
Dixon grew up in New Jersey, and played national-level tennis as a teen. In 1967, she won the national junior indoor championship, and was ranked in the top 20. She was invited to substitute for Rosie Casals, who was injured, as Billie Jean King's doubles partner for two tournaments when Dixon was age 17.

Dixon graduated from University of Southern California in 1973, with a degree in psychology.

From 1973 to 1975, she played professionally, including tournaments at Wimbledon and the U.S. Open.

== Yale Title IX litigation ==
In 1974 Dixon joined Yale University as the women's athletics coordinator and women's tennis coach. The conditions for women's athletics at Yale were significantly worse than for men, and Dixon was paid considerably less than comparable colleagues. Women had one tennis court while men had three, for example, and Dixon earned $24,000 annually for serving as both tennis coach and full-time athletics coordinator, overseeing recruiting for seven sports; her male peers earned more ($27,000) just for coaching.

Consequently, Dixon filed a complaint in 1975 with the Office of Civil Rights, and then filed a lawsuit under Title IX, the first such lawsuit against a major university. Title IX requires educational institutions receiving federal funds to treat its students equally across gender. Yale stripped Dixon of her administrative position at the end of the year, assigning her to the sports information office, and moving her from her private office to an office with a departmental coffee machine. Dixon left Yale a year later, resigning March 30, 1977, after working one more year under the reduced circumstances.

In approximately 1981, just a week or two before the case went to court, Yale offered to settle. Yale offered to pay Dixon $5,000, and to address her original complaints by providing trainers for female athletes, providing full-time women's coaches, and upgrading facilities and budgets for women athletes. In exchange, Dixon agreed not to talk to the press for some amount of time. (Note: Press conflicts differ on whether Dixon agreed not to talk to the press for five years or for two. See Sheehan (five years), ESPN (two years).)

== Later career ==
In the interim, Dixon worked as a journalist, working at NBC, PBS, and ABC. She was the first woman to do professional sports color commentary (for the Boston Lobsters of World Team Tennis), and in fact for her color commentary, Dixon was the first woman nominated for an Emmy Award in Sports Broadcasting. Dixon has also written for Sportswoman Magazine.

Dixon owned a tennis health club in Sunderland, Massachusetts, and worked in sports marketing, for a number of years, before being recruited to the University of Massachusetts, Amherst, as its head women's tennis coach in 2002. At UMass she has successfully resurrected the women's tennis team, and has been nominated for a number of awards for her coaching.

== Awards ==
- Yale Club of New York City, Honoree commemorating history of women's tennis at Yale (April 2006)
- New England Hall of Fame, inducted June 21, 2008
- Nominated, "Emmy Award in Sports Broadcasting in 1975 for her color commentary of the Spalding International Mixed Doubles Championship for PBS."
- Atlantic 10 Coach of the Year, three times.
