= Andréa Menezes =

Brazilian tennis player

- Country (sports): Brazil

Singles

Grand Slam singles results
- French Open: Q2 (1973)
- Wimbledon: Q1 (1973)

Doubles

Grand Slam doubles results
- French Open: 1R (1973)

Andréa Menezes is a Brazilian former professional tennis player.

Menezes had some notable successes in junior tennis, winning the 1969 Orange Bowl (14s) and 1971 Banana Bowl.

A member of the Brazil Federation Cup team in 1972 and 1973, Menezes featured in a total of six ties for her country, for wins in two singles rubbers. One of those wins, over Rita Felix in 1972 tie against Switzerland, secured Brazil victory in a Federation Cup tie for the first time.

In 1973 she appeared in the women's doubles main draw of the French Open (with Silvana Urroz) and entered the singles qualifying draw at Wimbledon.
