= Wendy Slaughter =

British tennis player

- Country (sports): Great Britain
- Born: Scotland

Singles

Grand Slam singles results
- Wimbledon: Q3 (1972)

Doubles

Grand Slam doubles results
- Wimbledon: 2R (1973)

Wendy Slaughter is a British former professional tennis player.

Slaughter, Scottish by birth, was a Scotland junior international but lived in Yorkshire.

After graduating from London University in 1972 she began to take up tennis more competitively and at the Wimbledon Championships that year fell in the final qualifying round to Tam O'Shaughnessy. She featured twice in the women's double main draw at Wimbledon during her career, including the second round in 1973.
