= Marilyn Pryde =

New Zealand tennis player (born 1952)

- Country (sports): New Zealand
- Born: 15 May 1952 (age 72)
- Plays: Right-handed

Singles

Grand Slam singles results
- French Open: Q2 (1972, 1973)
- Wimbledon: 2R (1972, 1973)

Doubles

Grand Slam doubles results
- French Open: 1R (1973)
- Wimbledon: 2R (1970, 1971)

Grand Slam mixed doubles results
- French Open: 1R (1973)
- Wimbledon: 3R (1970)

Marilyn Lawrence (née Pryde; born 15 May 1952) is a former New Zealand professional tennis player.

== Tennis career ==
Pryde won her first national championship in 1968 as a 15-year old and made her debut for the New Zealand Federation Cup team in 1970, going on to feature in eight ties. She was runner-up to Evonne Goolagong at the 1973 New Zealand Open and also came up against Goolagong in one of her appearances at Wimbledon.

== Personal life ==
Pryde's daughter, jewellery and handbag designer Kelly Lawrence, is married to New Zealand triathlete Terenzo Bozzone.
