= Rosalba Vido =

Italian tennis player

- Country (sports): Italy
- Born: 2 January 1953 (age 72); Alassio

Singles

Grand Slam singles results
- French Open: Q2 (1972)
- Wimbledon: Q2 (1972)
- US Open: 1R (1972)

Grand Slam mixed doubles results
- Wimbledon: 1R (1973)

Rosalba Vido (born 2 January 1953) is an Italian former professional tennis player.

Vido, the daughter of Davis Cup player Gino, represented the Italy Federation Cup team between 1972 and 1977, winning four singles and two doubles rubbers. Her 1975 campaign included wins over Patricia Medrado and Mariana Simionescu, then a loss to Evonne Goolagong in her only quarterfinal tie.

Her career highlights include a singles main draw appearance the 1972 US Open, as well as competing in the doubles at Wimbledon. She was a doubles runner-up at the 1972 Italian Open (with Gail Chanfreau) and a two-time doubles champion at the Italian Tennis Championships, in 1976 and 1977 (with Daniela Porzio).

== See also ==
- List of Italy Fed Cup team representatives
