= Yang Jeong-soon =

- Country (sports): South Korea
- Born: 26 February 1947 (age 78)

Singles

Grand Slam singles results
- Australian Open: 2R (1973)
- French Open: 1R (1973)

Doubles

Grand Slam doubles results
- Australian Open: 1R (1973)
- French Open: 1R (1973)

Grand Slam mixed doubles results
- French Open: 1R (1973)
- Wimbledon: 1R (1973)

Yang Jeong-soon (born 26 February 1947) is a Korean former professional tennis player.

Yang featured in 16 Federation Cup rubbers for South Korea during the 1970s, which included an upset win over America's Patti Hogan in 1973. Her best performance in a grand slam tournament was a second round appearance at the 1973 Australian Open, where she was eliminated by Evonne Goolagong. In 1978 she and Lee Duk-hee became the first Korean pair to win an Asian Games gold medal in women's doubles.
