= Judith Dibar-Gohn =

Romanian tennis player

- Country (sports): Romania
- Born: 10 May 1945 (age 79)

Singles

Grand Slam singles results
- French Open: 3R (1974)
- Wimbledon: 2R (1973)
Medal record
Universiade
Gold medal – first place	1965 Budapest	Mixed doubles

Judith Dibar-Gohn (born 10 May 1945) is a Romanian former tennis player. She was known as Judith Dibar before marriage.

Dibar-Gohn, Romania's leading player of the early 1970s, represented her country in five ties of the Federation Cup. She played a key role when Romania reached the semifinals in 1973, which was the team's first year in the tournament. The semifinal against South Africa almost didn't take place due to Romania's anti-apartheid policy, with the players initially informed the tie would be boycotted. It wasn't until two-hours before the opening rubber that the players were informed the decision was reversed and that they were allowed to compete.

At the Grand Slams, Dibar-Gohn's best performance was reaching the third round of the 1974 French Open. She made the second round at Wimbledon in 1973, losing to fourth-seeded Chris Evert.
