= Janice Tindle =

Canadian former professional tennis player (born 1950)

- Country (sports): Canada
- Born: July 3, 1950 (age 75)
- Plays: Right-handed

Singles

Grand Slam singles results
- Wimbledon: 1R (1973)

Doubles

Grand Slam doubles results
- Wimbledon: 2R (1969)

Grand Slam mixed doubles results
- Wimbledon: 2R (1973)

Janice Tindle (born July 3, 1950) is a Canadian former professional tennis player.

== Tennis career ==
Tindle, a Vancouver-based player, won back to back national singles championships in 1972 and 1973. She played collegiate tennis for Arizona State University and represented Canada in six Federation Cup ties. In 1973 she was a main draw qualifier at the Wimbledon Championships, where she lost her first round match to Wendy Turnbull in three sets.

== Personal life ==
Tindle's siblings Jill, Kim and Mark were all tennis players. Olympic swimmer Leslie Cliff married her brother Mark.

== See also ==
- List of Canada Fed Cup team representatives
