= Kazuko Sawamatsu =

Japanese tennis player (born 1951)

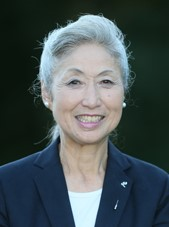
- Kazuko Yoshida
- Country (sports): Japan
- Born: 5 January 1951 (age 75) Nishinomiya, Japan

Singles
- Career titles: 14

Grand Slam singles results
- Australian Open: SF (1973)
- French Open: QF (1975)
- Wimbledon: 3R (1970, 1971, 1974, 1975)
- US Open: QF (1975)

Doubles
- Career titles: 6

Grand Slam doubles results
- Australian Open: QF (1974)
- French Open: SF (1975)
- Wimbledon: W (1975)
- US Open: 2R (1973, 1975)

Grand Slam mixed doubles results
- French Open: QF (1973)
- Wimbledon: QF (1969)
Medal record
Representing Japan
Summer Universiade
Silver medal – second place	1970 Turin	Women's singles
Silver medal – second place	1970 Turin	Women's doubles

Kazuko Sawamatsu (Japanese: 沢松和子, born 5 January 1951) is a retired tennis player from Japan.

She competed in a number of major LTA tournaments in the 1970s on the world circuit. At the 1975 Australian Open, she reached the quarterfinals as well as reached the quarterfinals of the French Open and U.S. Open the same year. She also reached the semifinals of the Australian Open in 1973, and won the 1975 Wimbledon ladies doubles title with partner Ann Kiyomura.

In November 1975, she won the singles title at the Japan Open Tennis Championships, defeating Kiyomura in the final in three sets, and together they won the doubles title.

Sawamatsu is the sister of tennis player Junko Sawamatsu and the aunt of Naoko Sawamatsu.

== Grand Slam finals ==
=== Doubles (1 title) ===
Result	Year	Championship	Surface	Partner	Opponents	Score
Win	1975	Wimbledon	Grass	(United States) Ann Kiyomura	(France) Françoise Dürr (Netherlands) Betty Stöve	7–5, 1–6, 7–5
