= 1974 Wimbledon Championships – Men's singles qualifying =

Men's singles qualifying
- 1974 Wimbledon Championships

Events
| Singles | men | women | | boys | girls |
| Doubles | men | women | mixed | boys | girls |
| WC Singles | men | women | quad |
| WC Doubles | men | women | quad |
| Legends | men | women | seniors |

Qualification
| Singles | men | women |
| Doubles | men | women | mixed |
- Wimbledon Championships

Players who neither had high enough rankings nor received wild cards to enter the main draw of the annual Wimbledon Tennis Championships participated in a qualifying tournament held one week before the event. One player withdrew from the main draw after qualifying had commenced, leading to the highest ranked player who lost in the final qualifying round, Juan Ignacio Muntañola, to be entered into the main draw as a lucky loser.

== Qualifiers ==
1. (France) Jean-François Caujolle
2. (South Africa) Rayno Seegers
3. (United States) Steve Krulevitz
4. (Netherlands) Rolf Thung
5. (Czechoslovakia) František Pála
6. (Australia) Paul Kronk
7. (France) Éric Deblicker
8. (Switzerland) Petr Kanderal
9. (South Africa) Bernard Mitton
10. (South Africa) John Yuill
11. (West Germany) Ulrich Pinner
12. (United States) Dick Dell
13. (Australia) Neale Fraser
14. (Sweden) Tenny Svensson
15. (United States) Armistead Neely
16. (West Germany) Hans-Joachim Plötz

== Lucky losers ==
1. (Spain) Juan Ignacio Muntañola

== Qualifying draw ==
Key

- Q = Qualifier
- WC = Wild card
- LL = Lucky loser
- Alt = Alternate
- ITF = ITF entry
- PR = Protected ranking
- SR = Special ranking
- SE = Special exempt
- JE = Junior exempt
- JR = Junior Accelerator Programme entrant
- CO = College Accelerator Programme entrant
- NG = Next Gen Accelerator Program entrant
- w/o = Walkover
- r = Retired
- d = Defaulted

=== First qualifier ===
First round
1 | (France) Jean-François Caujolle | 6 | 8
8 | (Australia) Alvin Gardiner | 3 | 6
4 | (New Zealand) Peter Langsford | 6 | 8
5 | (United States) Lee Tomlinson | 3 | 6
2 | (Spain) Juan Ignacio Muntañola | 6 | 6
7 | (New Zealand) Gary Slater | 4 | 2
3 | (United Kingdom) Christopher Wells | 6 | 6 | 6
6 | (Japan) Sachio Kato | 3 | 8 | 4

Second round
(France) Jean-François Caujolle | 3 | 6 | 6
(New Zealand) Peter Langsford | 6 | 4 | 4
(Spain) Juan Ignacio Muntañola | 6 | 9
(United Kingdom) Christopher Wells | 3 | 8

Qualifying competition
(France) Jean-François Caujolle | 9 | 4 | 9 | 6
(Spain) Juan Ignacio Muntañola | 8 | 6 | 8 | 4

=== Second qualifier ===
First round
1 | (South Africa) Rayno Seegers | 4 | 6 | 8
8 | (New Zealand) Russell Simpson | 6 | 2 | 6
4 | (Australia) John Eastburn | 6 | 7
5 | (Netherlands) Louk Sanders | 2 | 5
2 | (Japan) Yuji Tezuka | 6 | 6
7 | (India) Jayakumar Royappa | 2 | 4
3 | (West Germany) Alex Kurucz | 7 | 6
6 | (Mexico) Raúl Contreras | 5 | 2

Second round
(South Africa) Rayno Seegers | 7 | 6
(Australia) John Eastburn | 5 | 3
(Japan) Yuji Tezuka | 6 | 6
(West Germany) Alex Kurucz | 4 | 2

Qualifying competition
(South Africa) Rayno Seegers | 6 | 6 | 6
(Japan) Yuji Tezuka | 4 | 3 | 2

=== Third qualifier ===
First round
1 | (United States) Steve Krulevitz | 6 | 9
8 | (Argentina) Tito Vázquez | 3 | 8
4 | (Japan) Kenichi Hirai | 6 | 6
5 | (South Africa) Abe Segal | 3 | 2
3 | (Japan) Jun Kuki | 8 | 6 | 6
6 | (United Kingdom) Jonathan Smith | 9 | 3 | 4

Second round
(United States) Steve Krulevitz | 6 | 6
(Japan) Kenichi Hirai | 2 | 2
(Australia) Ray Keldie | 6 | 6
(Japan) Jun Kuki | 3 | 4

Qualifying competition
(United States) Steve Krulevitz | 6 | 6 | 4 | 6
(Australia) Ray Keldie | 3 | 3 | 6 | 3

=== Fourth qualifier ===
First round
1 | (Netherlands) Rolf Thung | 9 | 4 | 6
8 | (United States) Eugene Scott | 8 | 6 | 4
4 | (South Africa) David Mark Segal | 9 | 4 | 6
5 | (United Kingdom) Phil Siviter | 8 | 6 | 4
2 | (Jamaica) Richard Russell | 6 | 6
7 | (France) Patrice Hagelauer | 2 | 3
3 | (Australia) Ernie Ewert | 9 | 3 | 6
6 | (South Africa) Derek Schroder | 8 | 6 | 3

Second round
(Netherlands) Rolf Thung | 6 | 7
(South Africa) David Mark Segal | 4 | 5
(Jamaica) Richard Russell | 3 | 6 | 6
(Australia) Ernie Ewert | 6 | 3 | 3

Qualifying competition
(Netherlands) Rolf Thung | 3 | 6 | 7 | 6
(Jamaica) Richard Russell | 6 | 4 | 5 | 3

=== Fifth qualifier ===
First round
1 | (Czechoslovakia) František Pála | 6 | 8
8 | (Australia) Graeme Thomson | 2 | 6
4 | (United States) Norman Holmes | 3 | 8 | 6
5 | (South Africa) David Schneider | 6 | 6 | 2
2 | (Paraguay) Víctor Pecci | 6 | 7
7 | (Japan) Kiyoshi Tanabe | 4 | 5
3 | (Colombia) Jairo Velasco | 6 | 6
6 | (United Kingdom) Willie Davies | 4 | 2

Second round
(Czechoslovakia) František Pála | 9 | 9
(United States) Norman Holmes | 8 | 8
(Paraguay) Víctor Pecci | 6
(Colombia) Jairo Velasco | 0^{r}

Qualifying competition
(Czechoslovakia) František Pála | 6 | 5 | 3 | 6 | 6
(Paraguay) Víctor Pecci | 2 | 7 | 6 | 2 | 4

=== Sixth qualifier ===
First round
1 | (Australia) Paul Kronk | 6 | 6
8 | (Sweden) Terje Larsen | 4 | 4
4 | (Rhodesia) Colin Dowdeswell | 6 | 6
5 | (Finland) Reijo Tuomola | 0 | 1
2 | (United Kingdom) Mike Collins | 8 | 6
7 | (Switzerland) Freddy Blatter | 6 | 4
3 | (United States) Steve Faulk | 9 | 6 | 11
6 | (Netherlands) Fred Hemmes | 8 | 8 | 9

Second round
(Australia) Paul Kronk | 8 | 6
(Rhodesia) Colin Dowdeswell | 6 | 4
(United Kingdom) Mike Collins | 6 | 8 | 12
(United States) Steve Faulk | 2 | 9 | 10

Qualifying competition
(Australia) Paul Kronk | 6 | 8 | 7 | 6 | 6
(United Kingdom) Mike Collins | 4 | 9 | 9 | 3 | 2

=== Seventh qualifier ===
First round
1 | (France) Éric Deblicker | 4 | 7 | 9
8 | (United Kingdom) Martin Robinson | 6 | 5 | 7
4 | (Greece) Nicolas Kelaidis | 6 | 6
5 | (Egypt) Aly El Dawoudi | 4 | 1
2 | (West Germany) Frank Gebert | 7 | 8
7 | (United States) Jim McManus | 5 | 6
3 | (Australia) Bob Rheinberger | 4 | 6 | 6
6 | (South Africa) Byron Bertram | 6 | 4 | 2

Second round
(France) Éric Deblicker | 6 | 9
(Greece) Nicolas Kelaidis | 2 | 8
(West Germany) Frank Gebert | 7 | 7
(Australia) Bob Rheinberger | 5 | 5

Qualifying competition
(France) Éric Deblicker | 4 | 8 | 6 | 6
(West Germany) Frank Gebert | 6 | 6 | 3 | 3

=== Eighth qualifier ===
First round
1 | (Switzerland) Petr Kanderal | 6 | 7 | 6
8 | (United States) Pancho Walthall | 3 | 9 | 3
4 | (Mexico) Roberto Chávez | 8 | 6 | 6
5 | (South Africa) Clive Brebnor | 9 | 1 | 4
2 | (Chile) Belus Prajoux | 7 | 9 | 6
7 | (Canada) Tony Bardsley | 9 | 8 | 3
3 | (West Germany) Max Wünschig | 8 | 6
6 | (Australia) Greg Perkins | 6 | 4

Second round
(Switzerland) Petr Kanderal | 2 | 7 | 6
(Mexico) Roberto Chávez | 6 | 5 | 2
(Chile) Belus Prajoux | 6 | 6
(West Germany) Max Wünschig | 4 | 4

Qualifying competition
(Switzerland) Petr Kanderal | 9 | 6 | 6
(Chile) Belus Prajoux | 8 | 1 | 1

=== Ninth qualifier ===
First round
1 | (South Africa) Bernard Mitton | 4 | 6 | 6
8 | (United Kingdom) Paul Bradnam | 6 | 2 | 4
4 | (United States) Steve Tidball | 6 | 3 | 7
5 | (France) Jean-Louis Haillet | 4 | 6 | 5
2 | (Argentina) Lito Álvarez | 6 | 6
7 | (Australia) William Durham | 4 | 2
3 | (Brazil) Carlos Kirmayr | 6 | 6
6 | (United Kingdom) Richard Lewis | 4 | 1

Second round
(South Africa) Bernard Mitton | 6 | 6
(United States) Steve Tidball | 0 | 1
(Argentina) Lito Álvarez | 7 | 6
(Brazil) Carlos Kirmayr | 5 | 3

Qualifying competition
(South Africa) Bernard Mitton | 6 | 2 | 6 | 7
(Argentina) Lito Álvarez | 3 | 6 | 2 | 5

=== Tenth qualifier ===
First round
1 | (South Africa) John Yuill | 6 | 6
8 | (Australia) Phil Martin | 1 | 1
4 | (West Germany) Karl Fichtel | 6 | 3 | 6
5 | (Mexico) Luis Baraldi | 1 | 6 | 3
2 | (Australia) Robert Casey | 5 | 6 | 6
7 | (France) Denis Naegelen | 7 | 4 | 3
3 | (Venezuela) Jorge Andrew | 7 | 6
6 | (South Africa) Rauty Krog | 5 | 4

Second round
(South Africa) John Yuill | 6 | 6
(West Germany) Karl Fichtel | 1 | 4
(Australia) Robert Casey | 3 | 6 | 10
(Venezuela) Jorge Andrew | 6 | 2 | 8

Qualifying competition
(South Africa) John Yuill | 6 | 6 | 8
(Australia) Robert Casey | 3 | 1 | 6

=== Eleventh qualifier ===
First round
1 | (West Germany) Ulrich Pinner | 6 | 7
8 | (Australia) Keith Hancock | 2 | 5
4 | (Pakistan) Saeed Meer | 6 | 6
5 | (France) Christophe Casa | 4 | 3
2 | (South Africa) Keith Brebnor | 7 | 7 | 6
7 | (United States) John Fort | 5 | 9 | 3
3 | (Australia) John Trickey | 3 | 6 | 7
6 | (Spain) José Moreno | 6 | 2 | 5

Second round
(West Germany) Ulrich Pinner | 9 | 8
(Pakistan) Saeed Meer | 8 | 6
(South Africa) Keith Brebnor | 3 | 6 | 9
(Australia) John Trickey | 6 | 3 | 7

Qualifying competition
(West Germany) Ulrich Pinner | 6 | 6 | 6
(South Africa) Keith Brebnor | 1 | 3 | 2

=== Twelfth qualifier ===
First round
1 | (United States) Dick Dell | 6 | 6
8 | (Sweden) Jan Zabrodsky | 2 | 1
4 | (South Africa) Terry Ryan | 7 | 6
5 | (France) Hervé Gauvain | 5 | 2
2 | (Bolivia) Ramiro Benavides | 1 | 6 | 8
7 | (Australia) Allan McDonald | 6 | 3 | 6
3 | (United Kingdom) Colin McHugo | 6 | 7
6 | (Soviet Union) Anatoli Volkov | 4 | 5

Second round
(United States) Dick Dell | 6 | 8
(South Africa) Terry Ryan | 0 | 6
(Bolivia) Ramiro Benavides | 6 | 7 | 6
(United Kingdom) Colin McHugo | 0 | 9 | 2

Qualifying competition
(United States) Dick Dell | 6 | 6 | 6
(Bolivia) Ramiro Benavides | 2 | 4 | 3

=== Thirteenth qualifier ===
First round
1 | (Australia) Neale Fraser | 6 | 6
8 | (South Africa) Willem Prinsloo | 4 | 4
4 | (United Kingdom) Clay Iles | 7 | 8
5 | (France) Thierry Bernasconi | 5 | 6
2 | (Australia) Peter McNamara | 6 | 1 | 6
7 | (Pakistan) Munawar Iqbal | 4 | 6 | 3
3 | (Australia) Stephen Myers | 6 | 6
6 | (Finland) Leo Palin | 1 | 2

Second round
(Australia) Neale Fraser | 6 | 6
(United Kingdom) Clay Iles | 3 | 3
(Australia) Peter McNamara | 6 | 6
(Australia) Stephen Myers | 2 | 2

Qualifying competition
(Australia) Neale Fraser | 6 | 9 | 6
(Australia) Peter McNamara | 3 | 8 | 4

=== Fourteenth qualifier ===
First round
1 | (Sweden) Tenny Svensson | 4 | 6 | 6
8 | (Israel) Josef Stabholz | 6 | 2 | 2
4 | (United Kingdom) John Clifton | 6 | 6
5 | (United States) Fred McNair | 3 | 4
2 | (South Africa) Francois van der Merwe | 7 | 6
7 | (New Zealand) Nicky Boyne | 5 | 3
3 | (Australia) Greg Braun | 6 | 6
6 | (United States) Mike Machette | 3 | 4

Second round
(Sweden) Tenny Svensson | 6 | 6
(United Kingdom) John Clifton | 4 | 1
(South Africa) Francois van der Merwe | 7 | 6
(Australia) Greg Braun | 5 | 1

Qualifying competition
(Sweden) Tenny Svensson | 6 | 6 | 6
(South Africa) Francois van der Merwe | 3 | 0 | 3

=== Fifteenth qualifier ===
First round
1 | (United States) Armistead Neely | 6 | 6
8 | (Argentina) Norberto Herrero | 0 | 3
4 | (South Africa) Johnny Muller | 7 | 6 | 6
5 | (Netherlands) Jan Hordijk | 9 | 3 | 3
2 | (Australia) Cliff Letcher | 4 | 8 | 7
7 | (Japan) Jun Kamiwazumi | 6 | 6 | 5
3 | (France) Pierre Joly | 3 | 8 | 6
6 | (United Kingdom) Jasper Cooper | 6 | 6 | 2

Second round
(United States) Armistead Neely | 6 | 6
(South Africa) Johnny Muller | 2 | 3
(Australia) Cliff Letcher | 6 | 6
(France) Pierre Joly | 2 | 4

Qualifying competition
(United States) Armistead Neely | 2 | 7 | 6 | 8
(Australia) Cliff Letcher | 6 | 5 | 4 | 6

=== Sixteenth qualifier ===
First round
1 | (West Germany) Hans-Joachim Plötz | 6 | 6
8 | (New Zealand) Anthony Parun | 1 | 4
4 | (Australia) Eugene McCabe | 6 | 5 | 6
5 | (United States) Larry Turville | 0 | 7 | 3
2 | (South Africa) Pat Cramer | 8 | 6
7 | (Ecuador) Eduardo Zuleta | 6 | 1
3 | (Socialist Federal Republic of Yugoslavia) Dragan Stojović | 4 | 8 | 6
6 | (Australia) Trevor Little | 6 | 6 | 3

Second round
(West Germany) Hans-Joachim Plötz | 6 | 6
(Australia) Eugene McCabe | 4 | 3
(South Africa) Pat Cramer | 6 | 3 | 6
(Socialist Federal Republic of Yugoslavia) Dragan Stojović | 1 | 6 | 4

Qualifying competition
(West Germany) Hans-Joachim Plötz | 9 | 4 | 6 | 9
(South Africa) Pat Cramer | 8 | 6 | 3 | 8
