= Robin Tenney =

American tennis player

- Full name: Robin Tenney Archibald
- Country (sports): United States
- Born: May 13, 1958 (age 66)
- Plays: Left-handed

Singles

Grand Slam singles results
- French Open: 1R (1974, 1975)
- Wimbledon: 2R (1974, 1975)
- US Open: 2R (1973)

Doubles

Grand Slam doubles results
- French Open: 2R (1974)
- Wimbledon: 2R (1974)
- US Open: 1R (1974)

Grand Slam mixed doubles results
- Wimbledon: 4R (1974)
- US Open: 2R (1973, 1975)

Robin Tenney Archibald (born May 13, 1958) is an American former professional tennis player.

== Biography ==
Born in New York, Tenney is the youngster of three sisters. Her middle sister, Laurie, also competed on the professional tour. The eldest of the three sisters, Susan, was the first to take up the sport but didn't play beyond amateur tournaments. Their father, who was a real estate financier, relocated the family to California when she was 11 years of age and she attended Rexford School in Beverly Hills.

Tenney turned professional at the age of 15 in 1973 and made the quarter-finals of her first event, the Virginia Slims of Houston. She was eliminated from the tournament by Billie Jean King, who a day earlier had played the famous Bobby Riggs match.

A left-handed player, Tenney reached the second round of the 1973 US Open and also won through to the second round twice at Wimbledon. She made the round of 16 in the mixed doubles at the 1974 Wimbledon Championships, partnering Billy Martin.

She competed for the United States in the 1977 Maccabiah Games in Israel, losing in women's singles to Dana Gilbert.
