= 1996 Rado Open – Doubles =

Doubles
- 1996 Rado Open

Final
- Champions: (Czech Republic) Jiří Novák (Czech Republic) Pavel Vízner
- Runners-up: (United States) Trevor Kronemann (Australia) David Macpherson
- Score: 4–6, 7–6, 7–6

Details
- Draw: 16
- Seeds: 4

Events
| Singles | Doubles |
- Rado Open

Luis Lobo and Javier Sánchez were the defending champions but lost in the quarterfinals to Trevor Kronemann and David Macpherson.

Jiří Novák and Pavel Vízner won in the final 4–6, 7–6, 7–6 against Kronemann and Macpherson.

== Seeds ==
Champion seeds are indicated in bold text while text in italics indicates the round in which those seeds were eliminated.

1. (France) Guy Forget / (Switzerland) Jakob Hlasek (first round)
2. (Russia) Yevgeny Kafelnikov / (Netherlands) Menno Oosting (first round)
3. (Argentina) Luis Lobo / (Spain) Javier Sánchez (quarterfinals)
4. (Belgium) Libor Pimek / (South Africa) Byron Talbot (first round)

== Draw ==
Key

- Q = Qualifier
- WC = Wild card
- LL = Lucky loser
- Alt = Alternate
- ITF = ITF entry
- PR = Protected ranking
- SR = Special ranking
- SE = Special exempt
- JE = Junior exempt
- JR = Junior Accelerator Programme entrant
- CO = College Accelerator Programme entrant
- NG = Next Gen Accelerator Program entrant
- w/o = Walkover
- r = Retired
- d = Defaulted

First round
1 | (France) G Forget (Switzerland) J Hlasek | **6** | 3 | 4
(Germany) **M-K Goellner** (Australia) **M Philippoussis** | 4 | **6** | **6**
(Chile) M Ríos (Spain) E Sánchez | 4 | 6
WC | (France) **C Pioline** (Switzerland) **M Rosset** | **6** | **7**
3 | (Argentina) **L Lobo** (Spain) **J Sánchez** | **6** | **6**
(United States) B Behrens (Netherlands) S Noteboom | 2 | 2
WC | (Spain) S Bruguera (Spain) F Clavet | 6 | 3
(United States) **T Kronemann** (Australia) **D Macpherson** | **7** | **6**
(South Africa) D Adams (Netherlands) H J Davids | 4 | 2
Q | (Switzerland) **P Mohr** (Switzerland) **A Strambini** | **6** | **6**
(United States) **M Keil** (South Africa) **G Muller** | **7** | **6**
4 | (Belgium) L Pimek (South Africa) B Talbot | 6 | 4
WC | (Spain) **A Costa** (Spain) **C Moyá** | 3 | **6** | **7**
(United States) S Cannon (United States) G Van Emburgh | **6** | 1 | 6
(Czech Republic) **J Novák** (Czech Republic) **P Vízner** | **6** | 3 | **6**
2 | (Russia) Y Kafelnikov (Netherlands) M Oosting | 4 | **6** | 2

Quarterfinals
(Germany) M-K Goellner (Australia) M Philippoussis | 4 | **7** | 6
WC | (France) **C Pioline** (Switzerland) **M Rosset** | **6** | 6 | **7**
3 | (Argentina) L Lobo (Spain) J Sánchez | 4 | 5
(United States) **T Kronemann** (Australia) **D Macpherson** | **6** | **7**
Q | (Switzerland) P Mohr (Switzerland) A Strambini | 0 | 4
(United States) **M Keil** (South Africa) **G Muller** | **6** | **6**
WC | (Spain) A Costa (Spain) C Moyá | 1 | **7** | 4
(Czech Republic) **J Novák** (Czech Republic) **P Vízner** | **6** | 6 | **6**

Semifinals
WC | (France) C Pioline (Switzerland) M Rosset | 6 | 6
(United States) **T Kronemann** (Australia) **D Macpherson** | **7** | **7**
(United States) M Keil (South Africa) G Muller | 6 | 5
(Czech Republic) **J Novák** (Czech Republic) **P Vízner** | **7** | **7**

Final
(United States) T Kronemann (Australia) D Macpherson | **6** | 6 | 6
(Czech Republic) **J Novák** (Czech Republic) **P Vízner** | 4 | **7** | **7**
