= 1996 Rado Open – Singles =

Singles
- 1996 Rado Open

Final
- Champion: (Spain) Albert Costa
- Runner-up: (Spain) Félix Mantilla
- Score: 4–6, 7–6^{(7–2)}, 6–1, 6–0

Details
- Draw: 32
- Seeds: 8

Events
| Singles | Doubles |
- Rado Open

Yevgeny Kafelnikov was the defending champion but lost in the semifinals to Albert Costa.

Costa won in the final 4–6, 7–6^{(7–2)}, 6–1, 6–0 against Félix Mantilla.

== Seeds ==
A champion seed is indicated in bold while text in italics indicates the round in which that seed was eliminated.

1. (Russia) Yevgeny Kafelnikov (semifinals)
2. (Chile) Marcelo Ríos (first round)
3. (Switzerland) Marc Rosset (first round)
4. (France) Arnaud Boetsch (first round)
5. (France) Cédric Pioline (second round)
6. (Spain) **Albert Costa (champion)**
7. (United States) MaliVai Washington (first round)
8. (Spain) Carlos Moyá (second round)

== Draw ==
Key

- Q = Qualifier
- WC = Wild card
- LL = Lucky loser
- Alt = Alternate
- ITF = ITF entry
- PR = Protected ranking
- SR = Special ranking
- SE = Special exempt
- JE = Junior exempt
- JR = Junior Accelerator Programme entrant
- CO = College Accelerator Programme entrant
- NG = Next Gen Accelerator Program entrant
- w/o = Walkover
- r = Retired
- d = Defaulted
- NB: The Final was the best of 5 sets while all other rounds were the best of 3 sets.

=== Final ===
| Final |
| 6 | (Spain) **Albert Costa** | 4 | **7^{7}** | **6** | **6** |
| | (Spain) Félix Mantilla | **6** | 6^{2} | 1 | 0 |

=== Section 1 ===
First round
1 | (Russia) **Y Kafelnikov** | **7** | **6**
(Spain) R Carretero | 5 | 1
Q | (Argentina) A Zingman | 2 | **6** | 5
(Morocco) **K Alami** | **6** | 3 | **7**
WC | (Switzerland) **A Strambini** | **6** | **6**
WC | (Switzerland) P Mohr | 2 | 3
(Spain) **F Clavet** | **7^{7}** | **6**
7 | (United States) M Washington | 6^{5} | 1
3 | (Switzerland) M Rosset | **6** | 3 | 2
Q | (Germany) **O Gross** | 3 | **6** | **6**
(Italy) **R Furlan** | **7^{7}** | 6^{3} | **6**
(Switzerland) J Hlasek | 6^{1} | **7^{7}** | 4
(Argentina) **H Gumy** | **6** | **6**
Q | (Spain) E Benfele Álvarez | 4 | 3
(Czech Republic) C Doseděl | **7^{7}** | 5 | 6^{9}
6 | (Spain) **A Costa** | 6^{0} | **7** | **7^{11}**

Second round
1 | (Russia) **Y Kafelnikov** | **6** | **6**
(Morocco) K Alami | 3 | 3
WC | (Switzerland) A Strambini | 4 | 2
(Spain) **F Clavet** | **6** | **6**
Q | (Germany) O Gross | 0 | **7** | 2
(Italy) **R Furlan** | **6** | 5 | **6**
(Argentina) H Gumy | 3 | **6** | 4
6 | (Spain) **A Costa** | **6** | 4 | **6**

Quarterfinals
1 | (Russia) **Y Kafelnikov** | **6** | **7^{7}**
(Spain) F Clavet | 3 | 6^{4}
(Italy) R Furlan | 6^{4} | 2
6 | (Spain) **A Costa** | **7^{7}** | **6**

Semifinals
1 | (Russia) Y Kafelnikov | **6** | 4 | 3
6 | (Spain) **A Costa** | 3 | **6** | **6**

=== Section 2 ===
First round
5 | (France) **C Pioline** | **6** | **6**
(France) G Forget | 3 | 4
(Czech Republic) **B Ulihrach** | 2 | **6** | **6**
(Germany) M-K Goellner | **6** | 4 | 4
Q | (Germany) M Sinner | **6** | 4 | 4
WC | (Spain) **E Sánchez** | 4 | **6** | **6**
(Spain) **S Bruguera** | **7^{7}** | **6**
4 | (France) A Boetsch | 6^{3} | 1
8 | (Spain) **C Moyá** | **7** | **7^{7}**
(Spain) J Sánchez | 5 | 6^{2}
(Morocco) Y El Aynaoui | 6^{4} | 6^{5}
(Spain) **A Berasategui** | **7^{7}** | **7^{7}**
(Australia) M Philippoussis | 4 | 6^{6}
(Spain) **F Mantilla** | **6** | **7^{8}**
(Czech Republic) **J Novák** | **7^{7}** | 3 | **6**
2 | (Chile) M Ríos | 6^{3} | **6** | 2

Second round
5 | (France) C Pioline | 6^{5} | 3
(Czech Republic) **B Ulihrach** | **7^{7}** | **6**
WC | (Spain) E Sánchez | 2 | 3
(Spain) **S Bruguera** | **6** | **6**
8 | (Spain) C Moyá | 5 | 2
(Spain) **A Berasategui** | **7** | **6**
(Spain) **F Mantilla** | **7^{7}** | 0 | **6**
(Czech Republic) J Novák | 6^{2} | **6** | 3

Quarterfinals
(Czech Republic) **B Ulihrach** | **6** | **6**
(Spain) S Bruguera | 4 | 4
(Spain) A Berasategui | **6** | 6^{3} | 1
(Spain) **F Mantilla** | 2 | **7^{7}** | **6**

Semifinals
(Czech Republic) B Ulihrach | 4 | 3
(Spain) **F Mantilla** | **6** | **6**
