= 1974 Wimbledon Championships – Mixed doubles =

Mixed doubles
- 1974 Wimbledon Championships

Final
- Champions: (Australia) Owen Davidson (United States) Billie Jean King
- Runners-up: (United Kingdom) Mark Farrell (United Kingdom) Lesley Charles
- Score: 6–3, 9–7

Details
- Draw: 80 (3 Q )
- Seeds: 4

Events
Singles	men	women		boys	girls
Doubles	men	women	mixed	boys	girls
← 1973 ·	Wimbledon Championships	· 1975 →

Owen Davidson and Billie Jean King successfully defended their title, defeating Mark Farrell and Lesley Charles in the final, 6–3, 9–7 to win the mixed doubles tennis title at the 1974 Wimbledon Championships.

== Seeds ==
1. (Australia) Owen Davidson / (United States) Billie Jean King (champions)
2. (United States) Jimmy Connors / (United States) Chris Evert (third round, withdrew)
3. (Soviet Union) Alex Metreveli / (Soviet Union) Olga Morozova (quarterfinals)
4. (Australia) Kim Warwick / (Australia) Evonne Goolagong (quarterfinals)

Click on the seed number of a player to go to their draw section.

== Draw ==
=== Key ===
- Q = Qualifier
- WC = Wild card
- LL = Lucky loser
- Alt = Alternate
- SE = Special exempt
- PR = Protected ranking
- ITF = ITF entry
- JE = Junior exempt
- w/o = Walkover
- r = Retired
- d = Defaulted
- SR = Special ranking

=== Finals ===
Quarterfinals
1	(Australia) Owen Davidson (United States) Billie Jean King	6	6
(Mexico) Raúl Ramírez (United States) Susan Hagey	1	4
4	(Australia) Kim Warwick (Australia) Evonne Goolagong	3	5
(Australia) Tony Roche (France) Françoise Dürr	6	7
(Australia) Neale Fraser (Australia) Helen Gourlay	3	9	6
3	(Soviet Union) Alex Metreveli (Soviet Union) Olga Morozova	6	7	3
(United Kingdom) Mark Farrell (United Kingdom) Lesley Charles	7	6
(South Africa) Rayno Seegers (United States) Carrie Meyer	5	2

Semifinals
1	(Australia) Owen Davidson (United States) Billie Jean King	3	6	6
(Australia) Tony Roche (France) Françoise Dürr	6	3	4
(Australia) Neale Fraser (Australia) Helen Gourlay	9	6	2
(United Kingdom) Mark Farrell (United Kingdom) Lesley Charles	7	8	6

Final
1	(Australia) Owen Davidson (United States) Billie Jean King	6	9
(United Kingdom) Mark Farrell (United Kingdom) Lesley Charles	3	7

=== Top half ===
==== Section 1 ====
First round

Second round
1	(Australia) O Davidson (United States) BJ King	6	9
(Romania) I Țiriac (United States) P Bostrom	3	7
(Australia) G Perkins (Australia) P Gregg	4	9	1
(Netherlands) R Thung (Netherlands) T Zwaan	6	8	6
(United Kingdom) R Lewis (United Kingdom) G Coles	6	7	4
(Chile) P Rodríguez (Chile) M Rodríguez	3	9	6
Q	(United States) S Tidball (United States) M Christenson	6	5	6
Q	(Australia) E McCabe (Australia) D Evers	4	7	5

Third round
1	(Australia) O Davidson (United States) BJ King	6	6
(Netherlands) R Thung (Netherlands) T Zwaan	0	2
(Chile) P Rodríguez (Chile) M Rodríguez	2	3
Q	(United States) S Tidball (United States) M Christenson	6	6

Fourth round
1	(Australia) O Davidson (United States) BJ King	6	6
(United States) S Tidball (United States) M Christenson	2	2

==== Section 2 ====
First round

Second round
(United Kingdom) J Paish (Australia) W Paish	4	6	1
(Czechoslovakia) J Kodeš (Czechoslovakia) M Navrátilová	6	3	6
(Mexico) R Ramírez (United States) S Hagey	w/o
(South Africa) B Mitton (Republic of Ireland) S Minford
(Australia) G Braun (Australia) P Whytcross	8	7	6
(Chile) J Pinto Bravo (Chile) AM Pinto Bravo	9	5	8
(Australia) C Dibley (Australia) K Krantzcke	6	6
(United States) R Dell (United States) M Schallau	2	4

Third round
(Czechoslovakia) J Kodeš (Czechoslovakia) M Navrátilová	5	3
(Mexico) R Ramírez (United States) S Hagey	7	6
(Chile) J Pinto Bravo (Chile) AM Pinto Bravo	3	4
(Australia) C Dibley (Australia) K Krantzcke	6	6

Fourth round
(Mexico) R Ramírez (United States) S Hagey	2	6	8
(Australia) C Dibley (Australia) K Krantzcke	6	2	6

==== Section 3 ====
First round

Second round
4	(Australia) K Warwick (Australia) E Goolagong	8	6
(United Kingdom) R Becker (United Kingdom) V Wade	6	2
(United States) M Estep (United States) W Overton	2	1
(South Africa) F McMillan (South Africa) I Kloss	6	6
(Pakistan) M Iqbal (United Kingdom) J Fayter	6	9
(South Africa) P Cramer (United States) D Gralka	3	7
(United Kingdom) K Wooldridge (United Kingdom) W Wooldridge	6	3	6
(Brazil) JE Mandarino (Spain) C Mandarino	3	6	4

Third round
4	(Australia) K Warwick (Australia) E Goolagong	6	6
(South Africa) F McMillan (South Africa) I Kloss	4	4
(Pakistan) M Iqbal (United Kingdom) J Fayter	2	3
(United Kingdom) K Wooldridge (United Kingdom) W Wooldridge	6	6

Fourth round
4	(Australia) K Warwick (Australia) E Goolagong	6	6
(United Kingdom) K Wooldridge (United Kingdom) W Wooldridge	2	1

==== Section 4 ====
First round
(Japan) J Kamiwazumi (United States) A Kiyomura	6	5	6
(Bolivia) R Benavides (United Kingdom) P Moor	2	7	2
(Australia) S Myers (Japan) N Sato	8	5
Q	(Australia) J Trickey (United States) J Schwikert	9	7
(United Kingdom) R Wilson (United Kingdom) C Janes	3	4
(Australia) A Roche (France) F Dürr	6	6
(Hungary) R Machán (Hungary) É Szabó
(Argentina) G Vilas (Argentina) D Kopsic	w/o
(United States) W Brown (Australia) D Fromholtz	6	6
(United Kingdom) J Clifton (United Kingdom) J Helliar	4	1
(South Africa) D Schroder (South Africa) D Boshoff	w/o
(Sweden) B Borg (United States) P Teeguarden
(Australia) K Hancock (Australia) S Arnott	3	4
(Australia) E Ewert (Australia) K Harris	6	6
(South Africa) B Bertram (South Africa) G Stevens
(France) T Bernasconi (Belgium) M Gurdal	w/o

Second round
(Japan) J Kamiwazumi (United States) A Kiyomura	6	6
(Australia) J Trickey (United States) J Schwikert	4	4
(Australia) A Roche (France) F Dürr	6	6
(Argentina) G Vilas (Argentina) D Kopsic	3	4
(United States) W Brown (Australia) D Fromholtz	6	4	4
(South Africa) D Schroder (South Africa) D Boshoff	4	6	6
(Australia) E Ewert (Australia) K Harris	8	6
(France) T Bernasconi (Belgium) M Gurdal	6	2

Third round
(Japan) J Kamiwazumi (United States) A Kiyomura	3	3
(Australia) A Roche (France) F Dürr	6	6
(South Africa) D Schroder (South Africa) D Boshoff	6	2	6
(Australia) E Ewert (Australia) K Harris	1	6	4

Fourth round
(Australia) A Roche (France) F Dürr	6	8
(South Africa) D Schroder (South Africa) D Boshoff	2	6

=== Bottom half ===
==== Section 5 ====
First round
(Australia) P Doerner (Australia) C Doerner
(France) P Joly (Italy) A-M Nasuelli	w/o
(United States) M Machette (United States) S Walsh	w/o
(Australia) G Thomson (Australia) J Walker
(India) V Amritraj (United States) K May	6	6
(Netherlands) F Hemmes (Netherlands) N Lauteslager	3	4
(United States) A Neely (United States) C Martinez	7	4	12
(Colombia) J Velasco (Colombia) I Fernández de Soto	5	6	10
(Australia) A McDonald (United States) P Hogan	6	6
(Sweden) T Larsen (Sweden) I Bentzer	1	1
(Italy) P Marzano (Italy) L Bassi
(Switzerland) P Kanderal (Switzerland) M Kindler	w/o
(Australia) R Case (South Africa) B Cuypers
(South Africa) J Yuill (South Africa) R Whitehouse	w/o
(Australia) N Fraser (Australia) H Gourlay	6	6
(India) A Amritraj (Australia) J Dimond	2	4

Second round
(France) P Joly (Italy) A-M Nasuelli	4	5
(United States) M Machette (United States) S Walsh	6	7
(India) V Amritraj (United States) K May	9	7
(United States) A Neely (United States) C Martinez	7	5
(Australia) A McDonald (United States) P Hogan	6	6
(Switzerland) P Kanderal (Switzerland) M Kindler	3	4
(South Africa) J Yuill (South Africa) R Whitehouse	6	4
(Australia) N Fraser (Australia) H Gourlay	8	6

Third round
(United States) M Machette (United States) S Walsh	9	6
(India) V Amritraj (United States) K May	8	1
(Australia) A McDonald (United States) P Hogan	8	6
(Australia) N Fraser (Australia) H Gourlay	9	8

Fourth round
(United States) M Machette (United States) S Walsh	3	8	4
(Australia) N Fraser (Australia) H Gourlay	6	6	6

==== Section 6 ====
First round

Second round
(United States) E Scott (United States) K Kemmer	8	7
(New Zealand) A Parun (New Zealand) J Connor	6	5
(South Africa) W Prinsloo (Australia) M Morgan	w/o
(Rhodesia) R Dowdeswell (United Kingdom) L Beaven
(United Kingdom) M Robinson (United Kingdom) S Brasher	3	2
(Japan) T Sawamatsu (Japan) K Sawamatsu	6	6
(Sweden) K Johansson (Sweden) H Anliot
3	(Soviet Union) A Metreveli (Soviet Union) O Morozova	w/o

Third round
(United States) E Scott (United States) K Kemmer	6	7
(South Africa) W Prinsloo (Australia) M Morgan	3	5
(Japan) T Sawamatsu (Japan) K Sawamatsu	4	5
3	(Soviet Union) A Metreveli (Soviet Union) O Morozova	6	7

Fourth round
(United States) E Scott (United States) K Kemmer	7	1	4
3	(Soviet Union) A Metreveli (Soviet Union) O Morozova	5	6	6

==== Section 7 ====
First round

Second round
(Rhodesia) A Pattison (South Africa) D Pattison	3	3
(United States) W Martin (United States) R Tenney	6	6
(Japan) J Kuki (Japan) M Miyashita	2	6	6
(Netherlands) J Hordijk (Netherlands) E Appel	6	4	3
(Rhodesia) C Dowdeswell (United Kingdom) S Mappin	6	8
(United Kingdom) R Webb (United Kingdom) C Molesworth	3	6
(Soviet Union) T Kakulia (Soviet Union) M Kroschina	3	2
(United Kingdom) M Farrell (United Kingdom) L Charles	6	6

Third round
(United States) W Martin (United States) R Tenney	6	6
(Japan) J Kuki (Japan) M Miyashita	1	1
(Rhodesia) C Dowdeswell (United Kingdom) S Mappin	4	8
(United Kingdom) M Farrell (United Kingdom) L Charles	6	9

Fourth round
(United States) W Martin (United States) R Tenney	9	2	3
(United Kingdom) M Farrell (United Kingdom) L Charles	7	6	6

==== Section 8 ====
First round

Second round
(France) J Lovera (France) G Chanfreau	6	6
(United States) D Dell (United States) J Haas	4	1
(United Kingdom) R Taylor (United Kingdom) F Taylor	4	1
(South Africa) R Seegers (United States) C Meyer	6	6
(United Kingdom) J Lloyd (United Kingdom) L Blachford	6	8	3
(United Kingdom) J Feaver (United Kingdom) V Burton	4	9	6
(Austria) P Pokorny (Austria) S Pachta	6	5	3
2	(United States) J Connors (United States) C Evert	4	7	6

Third round
(France) J Lovera (France) G Chanfreau	6	1	3
(South Africa) R Seegers (United States) C Meyer	4	6	6
(United Kingdom) J Feaver (United Kingdom) V Burton	w/o
2	(United States) J Connors (United States) C Evert

Fourth round
(South Africa) R Seegers (United States) C Meyer	6	6
(United Kingdom) J Feaver (United Kingdom) V Burton	3	0
