= 1973 Wimbledon Championships – Women's doubles =

Women's doubles
- 1973 Wimbledon Championships

Final
- Champions: (United States) Rosie Casals (United States) Billie Jean King
- Runners-up: (France) Françoise Dürr (Netherlands) Betty Stöve
- Score: 6–1, 4–6, 7–5

Details
- Draw: 50 (3 Q )
- Seeds: 4

Events
| Singles | men | women | | boys | girls |
| Doubles | men | women | mixed | boys | girls |
| ← 1972 · | Wimbledon Championships | · 1974 → |

Billie Jean King and Betty Stöve were the defending champions, but decided not to play together.

King and Rosie Casals defeated Stöve and Françoise Dürr in the final, 6–1, 4–6, 7–5 to win the ladies' doubles tennis title at the 1973 Wimbledon Championships.

== Seeds ==
1. (United States) Rosie Casals / (United States) Billie Jean King (champions)
2. (Australia) Margaret Court / (Australia) Lesley Hunt (quarterfinals)
3. (France) Françoise Dürr / (Netherlands) Betty Stöve (final)
4. (Soviet Union) Olga Morozova / (United Kingdom) Virginia Wade (third round)

Click on the seed number of a player to go to their draw section.

== Draw ==
=== Key ===
- Q = Qualifier
- WC = Wild card
- LL = Lucky loser
- Alt = Alternate
- SE = Special exempt
- PR = Protected ranking
- ITF = ITF entry
- JE = Junior exempt
- w/o = Walkover
- r = Retired
- d = Defaulted
- SR = Special ranking

=== Finals ===
Quarterfinals
1 | (United States) Rosie Casals (United States) Billie Jean King | 6 | 6
(United States) Julie Anthony (United States) Mona Schallau | 4 | 3
(Australia) Evonne Goolagong (Australia) Janet Young | 6 | 6
(United Kingdom) Joyce Williams (United Kingdom) Winnie Wooldridge | 3 | 1
(Australia) Cynthia Doerner (United States) Laura duPont | 3 | 1
3 | (France) Françoise Dürr (Netherlands) Betty Stöve | 6 | 6
(Uruguay) Fiorella Bonicelli (Colombia) Isabel Fernández de Soto | 6 | 6
2 | (Australia) Margaret Court (Australia) Lesley Hunt | 2 | 4

Semifinals
1 | (United States) Rosie Casals (United States) Billie Jean King | 7 | 7
(Australia) Evonne Goolagong (Australia) Janet Young | 5 | 5
3 | (France) Françoise Dürr (Netherlands) Betty Stöve | 7 | 8
(Uruguay) Fiorella Bonicelli (Colombia) Isabel Fernández de Soto | 5 | 6

Final
1 | (United States) Rosie Casals (United States) Billie Jean King | 6 | 4 | 7
3 | (France) Françoise Dürr (Netherlands) Betty Stöve | 1 | 6 | 5

=== Top half ===
==== Section 1 ====
First round
(United States) J Anthony (United States) M Schallau | 2 | 6 | 6
(United States) C Evert (United States) V Ziegenfuss | 6 | 2 | 4

Second round
1 | (United States) R Casals (United States) BJ King | 6 | 6
(South Africa) D Boshoff (South Africa) I Kloss | 3 | 4
(South Africa) B Cuypers (United States) K Latham | 5 | 6 | 3
(United States) A Kiyomura (United States) M Redondo | 7 | 4 | 6
(South Africa) B Kirk (South Africa) P Pretorius | 6 | 5 | 6
(Indonesia) L Kaligis (Indonesia) L Sugiarto | 4 | 7 | 4
(United States) K Kemmer (South Africa) L Rossouw | 1 | 2
(United States) J Anthony (United States) M Schallau | 6 | 6

Third round
1 | (United States) R Casals (United States) BJ King | 6 | 6
(United States) A Kiyomura (United States) M Redondo | 2 | 0
(South Africa) B Kirk (South Africa) P Pretorius | 4 | 9 | 4
(United States) J Anthony (United States) M Schallau | 6 | 7 | 6

Quarterfinals
1 | (United States) R Casals (United States) BJ King | 6 | 6
(United States) J Anthony (United States) M Schallau | 4 | 3

==== Section 2 ====
First round
4 | (Soviet Union) O Morozova (United Kingdom) V Wade | 6 | 6
(Australia) P Coleman (Australia) W Turnbull | 3 | 1
(United States) J Newberry (United States) P Teeguarden | 8 | 4 | 6
(Australia) N Eastburn (Australia) D Fromholtz | 6 | 6 | 0
(United States) P Hogan (United States) S Walsh | 6 | 6
(Spain) AM Estalella (Spain) C Mandarino | 1 | 1
(Australia) K Krantzcke (United States) W Overton | 4 | 6 | 2
(Australia) E Goolagong (Australia) J Young | 6 | 2 | 6
(United Kingdom) L Charles (United Kingdom) G Coles | 6 | 4 | 6
(Belgium) M Gurdal (Belgium) M Van Haver | 3 | 6 | 4
(West Germany) K Ebbinghaus (Netherlands) G Walhof | 6 | 6
(France) F Guédy (France) O de Roubin | 1 | 1
(Republic of Ireland) S Minford (United States) L Tenney | 3 | 4
(Netherlands) A Bakker (Netherlands) M Schaar | 6 | 6
(France) N Fuchs (New Zealand) M Pryde | 6 | 2 | 1
(United Kingdom) J Williams (United Kingdom) W Wooldridge | 4 | 6 | 6

Second round
4 | (Soviet Union) O Morozova (United Kingdom) V Wade | 6 | 3 | 6
(United States) J Newberry (United States) P Teeguarden | 3 | 6 | 4
(United States) P Hogan (United States) S Walsh | 3 | 3
(Australia) E Goolagong (Australia) J Young | 6 | 6
(United Kingdom) L Charles (United Kingdom) G Coles | 3 | 4
(West Germany) K Ebbinghaus (Netherlands) G Walhof | 6 | 6
(Netherlands) A Bakker (Netherlands) M Schaar | 7 | 0
(United Kingdom) J Williams (United Kingdom) W Wooldridge | 9 | 6

Third round
4 | (Soviet Union) O Morozova (United Kingdom) V Wade | 7 | 4
(Australia) E Goolagong (Australia) J Young | 9 | 6
(West Germany) K Ebbinghaus (Netherlands) G Walhof | 6 | 3
(United Kingdom) J Williams (United Kingdom) W Wooldridge | 8 | 6

Quarterfinals
(Australia) E Goolagong (Australia) J Young | 6 | 6
(United Kingdom) J Williams (United Kingdom) W Wooldridge | 3 | 1

=== Bottom half ===
==== Section 3 ====
First round
(Australia) H Gourlay (United Kingdom) C Janes | 5 | 6 | 6
(Sweden) I Bentzer (Sweden) M Wikstedt | 7 | 3 | 3
(Australia) C Doerner (United States) L duPont | 6 | 6
(United Kingdom) L Beaven (United Kingdom) S Brasher | 2 | 3
(United Kingdom) L Blachford (United Kingdom) V Burton | 3 | 4
(United States) C Martinez (Australia) W Paish | 6 | 6
(Sweden) C Sandberg (United States) L Tuero
(United Kingdom) C Molesworth (United Kingdom) P Moor | w/o
(Australia) K Harris (Australia) K Melville | 6 | 6
(Romania) V Ruzici (Romania) M Simionescu | 2 | 0
Q | (United States) M Christenson (United States) J Dixon | 4 | 2
(United Kingdom) J Fayter (United States) M Michel | 6 | 6
(Czechoslovakia) M Navrátilová (Czechoslovakia) R Tomanová | 6 | 1 | 2
(United States) T Fretz (United States) J Heldman | 4 | 6 | 6
(United States) P Bostrom (United States) S Stap | 1 | 3
3 | (France) F Dürr (Netherlands) B Stöve | 6 | 6

Second round
(Australia) H Gourlay (United Kingdom) C Janes | 5 | 3
(Australia) C Doerner (United States) L duPont | 7 | 6
(United States) C Martinez (Australia) W Paish | 6 | 6
(United Kingdom) C Molesworth (United Kingdom) P Moor | 4 | 4
(Australia) K Harris (Australia) K Melville | 3 | 4
(United Kingdom) J Fayter (United States) M Michel | 6 | 6
(United States) T Fretz (United States) J Heldman | 7 | 2 | 4
3 | (France) F Dürr (Netherlands) B Stöve | 5 | 6 | 6

Third round
(Australia) C Doerner (United States) L duPont | 6 | 6
(United States) C Martinez (Australia) W Paish | 3 | 3
(United Kingdom) J Fayter (United States) M Michel | 5 | 0
3 | (France) F Dürr (Netherlands) B Stöve | 7 | 6

Quarterfinals
(Australia) C Doerner (United States) L duPont | 3 | 1
3 | (France) F Dürr (Netherlands) B Stöve | 6 | 6

==== Section 4 ====
First round
(Japan) K Fukuoka (Japan) K Sawamatsu | 4 | 6 | 1
(Uruguay) F Bonicelli (Colombia) I Fernández de Soto | 6 | 4 | 6

Second round
(Uruguay) F Bonicelli (Colombia) I Fernández de Soto | 6 | 6
(Czechoslovakia) M Neumannová (Czechoslovakia) V Vopičková | 2 | 1
(Italy) L Bassi (Italy) L Pericoli | 4 | 7 | 0
Q | (Canada) V Berner (Australia) P Faulkner | 6 | 5 | 6
(Italy) M Giorgi (Italy) D Marzano | 4 | 6 | 7
(United Kingdom) S Mappin (United Kingdom) W Slaughter | 6 | 2 | 5
Q | (Australia) C Matison (Australia) M Tesch | 1 | 2
2 | (Australia) M Court (Australia) L Hunt | 6 | 6

Third round
(Uruguay) F Bonicelli (Colombia) I Fernández de Soto | 6 | 6
Q | (Canada) V Berner (Australia) P Faulkner | 1 | 3
(Italy) M Giorgi (Italy) D Marzano | 2 | 2
2 | (Australia) M Court (Australia) L Hunt | 6 | 6

Quarterfinals
(Uruguay) F Bonicelli (Colombia) I Fernández de Soto | 6 | 6
2 | (Australia) M Court (Australia) L Hunt | 2 | 4
