= List of Switzerland Davis Cup team representatives =

This is a list of tennis players who have represented the Switzerland Davis Cup team in an official Davis Cup match. Switzerland have taken part in the competition since 1923.

== Players ==
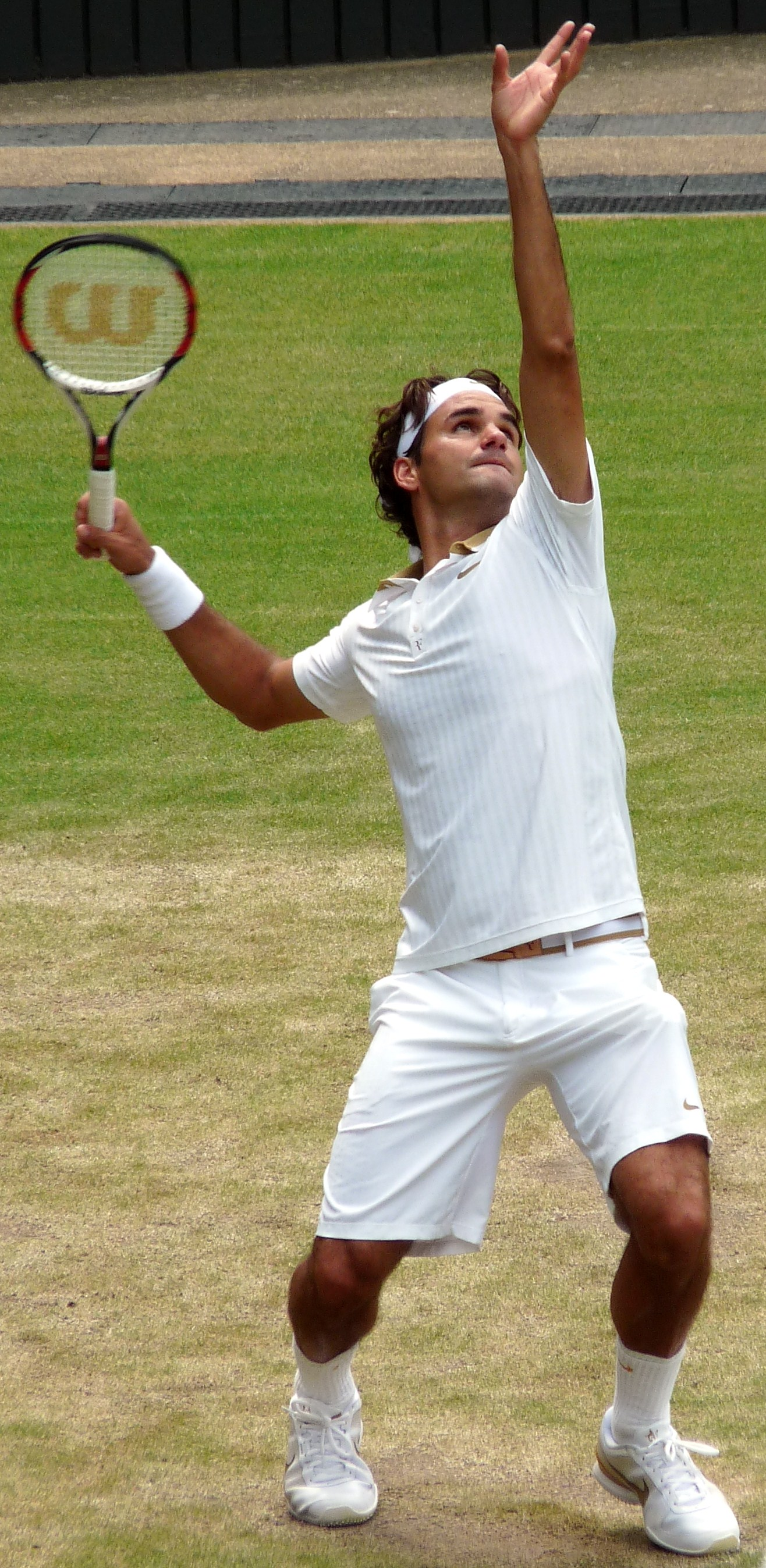
Roger Federer

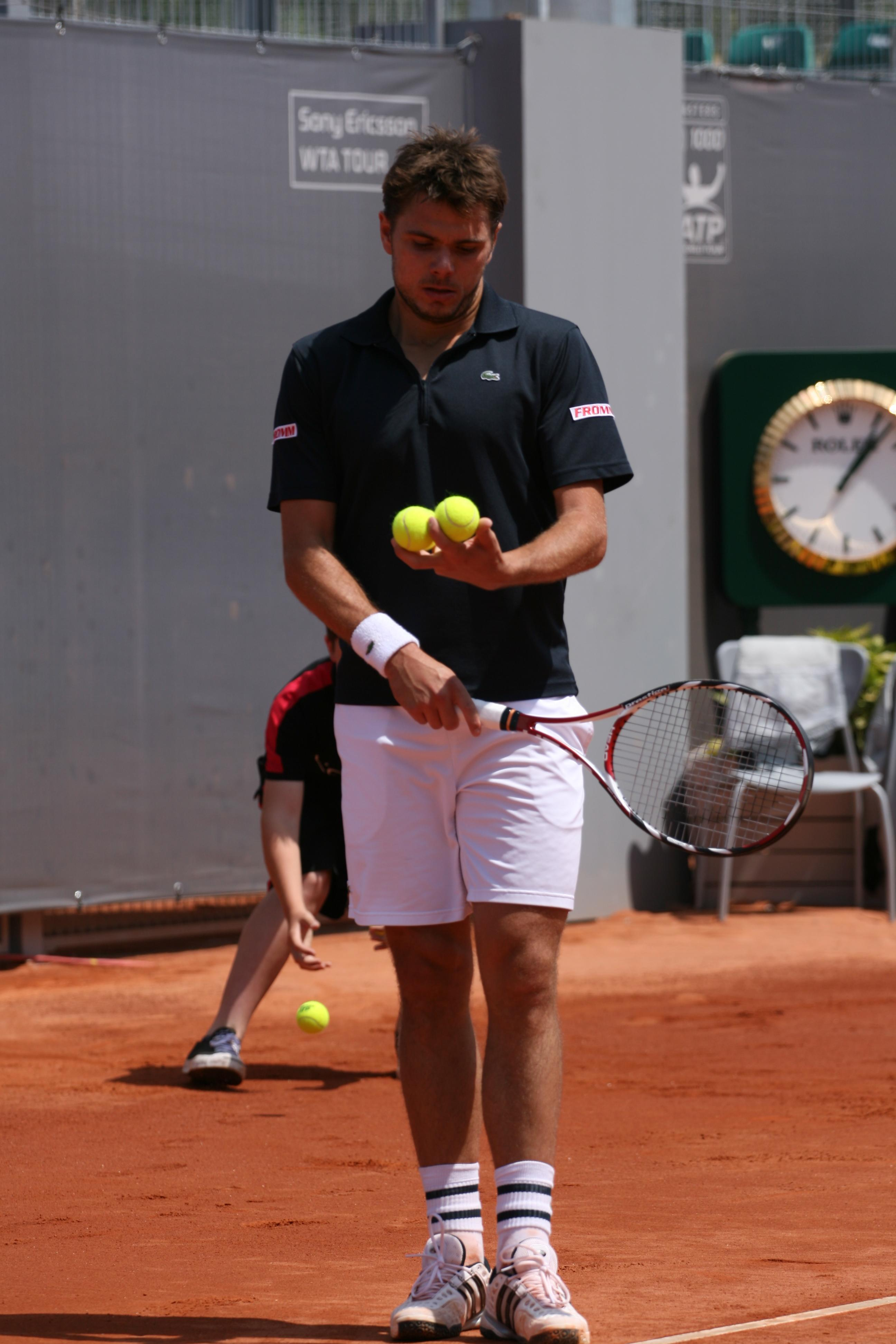
Stanislas Wawrinka

Player	W-L (Total)	W-L (Singles)	W-L (Doubles)	Ties	Debut
Charles Aeschlimann	24–26	15–17	9–9	19	1923
Max Albrecht	4–11	3–10	1–1	8	1948
Yves Allegro	6–9	1–1	5–8	14	2004
Bernard Auberson	0–1	0–0	0–1	1	1963
Erwin Balestra	2–9	2–9	0–0	6	1952
George Bastl	5–9	3–8	2–1	12	1998
Antoine Bellier	1–4	1–3	0–1	4	2016
Rémy Bertola	0–2	0–1	0–1	1	2024
Freddy Blatter	0–2	0–1	0–1	1	1972
Jean-Pierre Blondel	2–4	0–1	2–3	5	1950
Paul Blondel	11–24	5–15	6–9	17	1951
Adrian Bodmer	0–3	0–2	0–1	2	2017
Stéphane Bohli	4–2	4–2	0–0	4	2007
Adrien Bossel	1–5	0–3	1–2	4	2015
Michel Burgener	0–9	0–8	0–1	4	1970
René Buser	4–7	0–0	4–7	11	1946
Hector Chiesa	0–2	0–2	0–0	1	1930
Marco Chiudinelli	9–19	8–13	1–6	18	2005
Ivan Dupasquier	2–1	2–1	0–0	3	1980
Bernard Du Pont	1–2	1–1	0–1	2	1955
Sandro Ehrat	1–3	1–2	0–1	3	2018
Max Ellmer	9–8	9–8	0–0	9	1933
Roger Federer	52–18	40–8	12–10	27	1999
Maurice Ferrier	2–2	0–0	2–2	4	1923
Hector Fisher	22–18	19–10	3–8	15	1931
Martin Froesch	10–12	8–10	2–2	10	1955
Serge Gramegna	1–4	0–2	1–2	3	1979
Georges Grange	0–2	0–2	0–0	1	1950
Heinz Grimm	1–5	1–3	0–2	2	1960
Heinz Günthardt	36–28	22–16	14–12	30	1976
Markus Günthardt	9–6	0–1	9–5	14	1980
Ivo Heuberger	1–7	1–7	0–0	6	1997
Jakob Hlasek	49–30	34–20	15–10	29	1982
Hans Huonder	6–12	4–10	2–2	7	1946
Max Hürlimann	2–2	2–2	0–0	3	1975
Marc-Andrea Hüsler	10–10	5–6	5–4	12	2018
Adel Ismail	7–10	6–5	1–5	7	1952
Petr Kanderal	14–9	10–6	4–3	11	1973
Michel Kratochvil	3–9	3–9	0–0	8	2000
Henri Laaksonen	15–15	13–12	2–3	15	2013
Michael Lammer	4–9	1–8	3–1	9	2006
Jorge Lemann	0–2	0–2	0–0	1	1962
Boris Maneff	2–8	1–4	1–4	6	1936
Leonardo Manta	0–1	0–0	0–1	1	1971
Lorenzo Manta	10–6	1–4	9–2	11	1995
Luca Margaroli	0–4	0–0	0–4	4	2017
Charles Martin	5–8	4–8	1–0	6	1923
Claudio Mezzadri	14–6	11–4	3–2	9	1987
Patrick Mohr	0–2	0–2	0–0	2	1994
Hans Pfaff	0–1	0–0	0–1	1	1947
Leandro Riedi	2–2	1–2	1–0	2	2023
Alexander Ritschard	1–0	1–0	0–0	1	2022
Marc Rosset	37–21	24–13	13–8	26	1990
Guy Sautter	3–2	0–0	3–2	5	1923
Ernst Schori	0–4	0–1	0–3	4	1959
Bruno Schweizer	0–2	0–2	0–0	1	1963
Jurg Siegrist	0–2	0–2	0–0	1	1964
Bruno Spielmann	0–1	0–0	0–1	1	1962
Jost Spitzer	11–10	8–8	3–2	9	1939
Roland Stadler	23–18	20–18	3–0	22	1979
Theodor Stalder	2–8	2–8	0–0	5	1965
Werner Steiner	2–5	0–0	2–5	7	1933
Alexandre Strambini	0–2	0–1	0–1	1	1996
Dominic Stricker	5–8	1–4	4–4	9	2021
Dimitri Sturdza	17–25	10–16	7–9	17	1964
Dominik Utzinger	3–0	2–0	1–0	1	1985
Stanislas Wawrinka	28–30	24–15	4–15	27	2004
Matthias Werren	7–11	1–3	6–8	15	1964
Jean Wuarin	2–11	1–9	1–2	6	1926
