= Max Hürlimann =

Swiss tennis player (born 1951)

- ITF name: Max Huerlimann
- Country (sports): Switzerland
- Born: 30 July 1951 (age 74)
- Height: 5 ft 5 in (165 cm)

Singles
- Career record: 1–8
- Highest ranking: No. 163 (26 Dec 1979)

Max Hürlimann (born 30 July 1951) is a Swiss former professional tennis player.

Active in the 1970s, Hürlimann was based in Zürich and didn't turn professional until the age of 26, due to his tertiary studies in accounting. He reached a best singles ranking inside the world's top 200 during his time on tour, with career wins over Rick Fagel and Butch Seewagen. Between 1975 and 1978 he made appearances for the Switzerland Davis Cup team, winning two of his four singles rubbers.

== See also ==
- List of Switzerland Davis Cup team representatives
