= 1974 Wimbledon Championships – Women's singles =

Women's singles
- 1974 Wimbledon Championships

Final
- Champion: (United States) Chris Evert
- Runner-up: (Soviet Union) Olga Morozova
- Score: 6–0, 6–4

Details
- Draw: 96 (8 Q )
- Seeds: 8

Events
Singles	men	women		boys	girls
Doubles	men	women	mixed	boys	girls
← 1973 ·	Wimbledon Championships	· 1975 →

Chris Evert defeated Olga Morozova in the final, 6–0, 6–4 to win the ladies' singles tennis title at the 1974 Wimbledon Championships. It was her first Wimbledon singles title and second major singles title overall.

Billie Jean King was the two-time defending champion, but lost in the quarterfinals to Morozova.

== Seeds ==
1. (United States) Billie Jean King (quarterfinals)
2. (United States) Chris Evert (champion)
3. (Australia) Evonne Goolagong (quarterfinals)
4. (United States) Rosie Casals (fourth round)
5. (United Kingdom) Virginia Wade (semifinals)
6. (Australia) Kerry Melville (semifinals)
7. (United States) Nancy Gunter (withdrew)
8. (Soviet Union) Olga Morozova (final)

Click on the seed number of a player to go to their draw section.

Nancy Gunter withdrew due to injury. She was replaced in the draw by lucky loser Tine Zwaan.

== Draw ==
=== Key ===
- Q = Qualifier
- WC = Wild card
- LL = Lucky loser
- Alt = Alternate
- ITF = ITF entry
- PR = Protected ranking
- SR = Special ranking
- SE = Special exempt
- JE = Junior exempt
- JR = Junior Accelerator Programme entrant
- CO = College Accelerator Programme entrant
- NG = Next Gen Accelerator Program entrant
- w/o = Walkover
- r = Retired
- d = Defaulted

=== Finals ===
Quarterfinals
1	(United States) Billie Jean King	5	2
8	(Soviet Union) Olga Morozova	7	6
(South Africa) Linky Boshoff	3	2
5	(United Kingdom) Virginia Wade	6	6
6	(Australia) Kerry Melville	9	1	6
3	(Australia) Evonne Goolagong	7	6	2
(West Germany) Helga Masthoff	4	2
2	(United States) Chris Evert	6	6

Semifinals
8	(Soviet Union) Olga Morozova	1	7	6
5	(United Kingdom) Virginia Wade	6	5	4
6	(Australia) Kerry Melville	2	3
2	(United States) Chris Evert	6	6

Final
8	(Soviet Union) Olga Morozova	0	4
2	(United States) Chris Evert	6	6

=== Top half ===
==== Section 1 ====
First round

Second round
1	(United States) BJ King	6	6
(United States) K May	1	1
(Romania) M Simionescu	2	0
(France) F Dürr	6	6
(United Kingdom) C Janes	6	6
(Romania) V Ruzici	4	2
(Argentina) E Weisenberger	8	4	2
(United Kingdom) L Charles	6	6	6

Third round
1	(United States) BJ King	6	7
(France) F Dürr	1	5
(United Kingdom) C Janes	6	3	0
(United Kingdom) L Charles	4	6	6

Fourth round
1	(United States) BJ King	6	6
(United Kingdom) L Charles	3	0

==== Section 2 ====
First round

Second round
8	(Soviet Union) O Morozova	6	6
(United Kingdom) S Brasher	1	0
(Australia) W Paish	6	6
(Sweden) I Bentzer	3	2
(United Kingdom) W Wooldridge	6	6
Q	(Australia) N Gregory	0	0
(Australia) K Krantzcke	6	6
(South Africa) L Rossouw	0	3

Third round
8	(Soviet Union) O Morozova	2	6	9
(Australia) W Paish	6	0	7
(United Kingdom) W Wooldridge	2	7
(Australia) K Krantzcke	6	9

Fourth round
8	(Soviet Union) O Morozova	9	6
(Australia) K Krantzcke	7	4

==== Section 3 ====
First round
4	(United States) R Casals	6	6
(United Kingdom) P Moor	2	1
Q	(Sweden) H Anliot	6	2
(United States) P Teeguarden	8	6
(Sweden) C Sandberg	8	1
(United Kingdom) S Mappin	9	6
(Czechoslovakia) M Navrátilová	4	6	3
Q	(Socialist Federal Republic of Yugoslavia) M Jaušovec	6	3	6
(Belgium) M Gurdal
(Czechoslovakia) V Vopičková	w/o
(United Kingdom) S Barker	0	7
(South Africa) D Boshoff	6	9
(Australia) H Gourlay	6	7
(United States) M Michel	4	5
(Czechoslovakia) R Tomanová	6	3	6
(United Kingdom) L Blachford	2	6	3

Second round
4	(United States) R Casals	6	9
(United States) P Teeguarden	2	8
(United Kingdom) S Mappin	4	1
Q	(Socialist Federal Republic of Yugoslavia) M Jaušovec	6	6
(Belgium) M Gurdal	3	5
(South Africa) D Boshoff	6	7
(Australia) H Gourlay	6	6
(Czechoslovakia) R Tomanová	4	2

Third round
4	(United States) R Casals	6	6
Q	(Socialist Federal Republic of Yugoslavia) M Jaušovec	3	4
(South Africa) D Boshoff	6	5	9
(Australia) H Gourlay	3	7	7

Fourth round
4	(United States) R Casals	2	3
(South Africa) D Boshoff	6	6

==== Section 4 ====
First round
5	(United Kingdom) V Wade	6	6
(United Kingdom) V Burton	0	0
(France) O de Roubin	0	3
(United States) J Anthony	6	6
(United States) E Nagelsen	6	8	6
(United States) L Tenney	1	9	4
(France) G Chanfreau	6	6
(Argentina) B Araujo	1	0
(United Kingdom) J Fayter	0	8
(United States) A Kiyomura	6	9
(Soviet Union) M Kroschina	6	6
(Australia) D Fromholtz	4	1
(United States) P Hogan	8	8
(United States) W Overton	6	6
(United Kingdom) C Colman	1	2
(South Africa) B Cuypers	6	6

Second round
5	(United Kingdom) V Wade	7	6
(United States) J Anthony	5	3
(United States) E Nagelsen	7	6
(France) G Chanfreau	5	3
(United States) A Kiyomura	8	2	6
(Soviet Union) M Kroschina	6	6	3
(United States) P Hogan	6	6
(South Africa) B Cuypers	3	0

Third round
5	(United Kingdom) V Wade	6	6
(United States) E Nagelsen	3	2
(United States) A Kiyomura	4	2
(United States) P Hogan	6	6

Fourth round
5	(United Kingdom) V Wade	6	6
(United States) P Hogan	3	1

=== Bottom half ===
==== Section 5 ====
First round
(South Africa) G Stevens	1	6	6
LL	(United States) S Stap	6	1	1
(Sweden) M Wikstedt	6	4	6
LL	(Netherlands) E Appel	3	6	4
(United States) T Fretz	2	6	6
(Romania) J Gohn	6	1	2
(Australia) W Turnbull	6	6
(United States) B Downs	2	2
(United States) J Heldman	6	6
(United States) L Fleming	3	0
Q	(United States) P Bostrom	2	2
(Japan) K Sawamatsu	6	6
(United Kingdom) C Molesworth	2	3
Q	(United States) R Tenney	6	6
(Netherlands) B Stöve	6	4	4
6	(Australia) K Melville	4	6	6

Second round
(South Africa) G Stevens	6	6
(Sweden) M Wikstedt	3	3
(United States) T Fretz	7	6
(Australia) W Turnbull	5	3
(United States) J Heldman	4	4
(Japan) K Sawamatsu	6	6
Q	(United States) R Tenney	4	1
6	(Australia) K Melville	6	6

Third round
(South Africa) G Stevens	3	2
(United States) T Fretz	6	6
(Japan) K Sawamatsu	2	3
6	(Australia) K Melville	6	6

Fourth round
(United States) T Fretz	1^{r}
6	(Australia) K Melville	5

==== Section 6 ====
First round
(United Kingdom) L Mottram	0	3
(United States) K Kemmer	6	6
(United States) J Evert	6	4
(United States) S Walsh	8	6
(Uruguay) F Bonicelli	6	6
(Czechoslovakia) M Neumannová	3	4
(United States) K Latham	6	9
Q	(United States) S Greer	1	8
(Israel) P Peisachov	6	6
(United States) C Meyer	4	3
(Australia) K Harris	6	6
(United Kingdom) L Beaven	2	3
(South Africa) I Kloss	6	6
(Indonesia) L Kaligis	1	2
(Netherlands) M Schaar	1	1
3	(Australia) E Goolagong	6	6

Second round
(United States) K Kemmer	1	6	6
(United States) S Walsh	6	2	3
(Uruguay) F Bonicelli	2	7	6
(United States) K Latham	6	5	2
(Israel) P Peisachov	3	3
(Australia) K Harris	6	6
(South Africa) I Kloss	2	4
3	(Australia) E Goolagong	6	6

Third round
(United States) K Kemmer	6	3	8
(Uruguay) F Bonicelli	4	6	6
(Australia) K Harris	6	5	4
3	(Australia) E Goolagong	4	7	6

Fourth round
(United States) K Kemmer	1	4
3	(Australia) E Goolagong	6	6

==== Section 7 ====
First round

Second round
(United Kingdom) A Coe	2	8	6
(Australia) J Young	6	6	8
(West Germany) H Masthoff	9	6
(United Kingdom) J Hume	8	4
(United States) V Ziegenfuss	6	1	2
(Argentina) R Giscafré	1	6	6
(United Kingdom) G Coles	3	7	2
LL	(Netherlands) T Zwaan	6	5	6

Third round
(Australia) J Young	7	8	5
(West Germany) H Masthoff	5	9	7
(Argentina) R Giscafré	6	6
LL	(Netherlands) T Zwaan	3	2

Fourth round
(West Germany) H Masthoff	6	6
(Argentina) R Giscafré	2	4

==== Section 8 ====
First round

Second round
Q	(Australia) C O'Neil	1	6	6
(South Africa) R Whitehouse	6	2	2
(France) N Fuchs	0	0
(United States) M Schallau	6	6
Q	(Australia) C Matison	2	7	3
(Colombia) I Fernández de Soto	6	5	6
(Australia) L Hunt	6	7	9
2	(United States) C Evert	8	5	11

Third round
(Australia) C O'Neil	2	3
(United States) M Schallau	6	6
(Colombia) I Fernández de Soto	1	1
2	(United States) C Evert	6	6

Fourth round
(United States) M Schallau	5	1
2	(United States) C Evert	7	6

Preceded by 1974 French Open – Women's singles	Grand Slam women's singles	Succeeded by 1974 US Open – Women's singles
