= Derek Schroder =

South African tennis player

- Country (sports): South Africa
- Born: 26 April 1940 (age 85)

Singles
- Career record: 10–26
- Highest ranking: No. 214 (17 January 1975)

Grand Slam singles results
- French Open: 2R (1970)
- Wimbledon: 2R (1970)
- US Open: 1R (1972)

Doubles
- Career record: 1–13

Grand Slam doubles results
- Wimbledon: 1R (1971, 1972, 1974)
- US Open: 1R (1972)

Grand Slam mixed doubles results
- Wimbledon: 4R (1974)
- US Open: 2R (1972)

Derek Schroder (born 26 April 1940) is a South African former professional tennis player. He competed on the international circuit in the 1960s and 1970s.

Schroder reached the second round of the singles at both the French Open and Wimbledon in 1970. His longest run in a grand slam tournament came in mixed doubles at the 1974 Wimbledon Championships, where he and Linky Boshoff made the round of 16.

Since 1988 he has lived in Brisbane and works in real estate.
