= Rayno Seegers =

South African tennis player

- Country (sports): South Africa
- Born: 29 February 1952 (age 73)

Singles
- Career record: 11–26
- Highest ranking: No. 163 (6 November 1974)

Grand Slam singles results
- French Open: 1R (1970)
- Wimbledon: 1R (1969, 1974)
- US Open: 1R (1973)

Doubles
- Career record: 4–11

Grand Slam doubles results
- Wimbledon: 1R (1972, 1974)
- US Open: 1R (1973)

Grand Slam mixed doubles results
- Wimbledon: QF (1974)

Rayno Seegers (born 29 February 1952) is a South African former professional tennis player.

Seegers, an alumnus of Afrikaanse Hoër Seunskool in Pretoria, played collegiate tennis for the UCLA Bruins in 1973. He was a mixed doubles quarter-finalist at the 1974 Wimbledon Championships, partnering American Carrie Meyer.
