= Maricaye Christenson =

American tennis player

- Country (sports): United States
- Born: January 11, 1948 (age 77); Grand Junction, Colorado
- Plays: Right-handed

Singles

Grand Slam singles results
- French Open: Q1 (1975)
- Wimbledon: Q2 (1971)
- US Open: 2R (1968)

Doubles

Grand Slam doubles results
- Wimbledon: 1R (1973, 1974)
- US Open: 1R (1969)

Grand Slam mixed doubles results
- Wimbledon: 4R (1974)

Maricaye Christenson (born January 11, 1948) is an American former professional tennis player.

== Tennis career ==
Born and raised in Grand Junction, Colorado, Christenson was an alternate on the junior U.S. Wightman Cup team and played No. 1 singles for the University of Southern California, after which she competed on the professional tour. She reached the fourth round of the 1974 Wimbledon Championships in mixed doubles. Later in the decade, she was a tour manager on the Avon Futures circuit. She was a 2011 inductee into the Colorado Tennis Hall of Fame.

== Personal life ==
Christenson is married to Don Daniels, who she met while attending USC during the 1960s.
