= 1974 Wimbledon Championships – Men's doubles =

Men's doubles tennis tournament

Men's doubles
- 1974 Wimbledon Championships

Final
- Champions: (Australia) John Newcombe (Australia) Tony Roche
- Runners-up: (United States) Bob Lutz (United States) Stan Smith
- Score: 8–6, 6–4, 6–4

Details
- Draw: 64 (8 Q )
- Seeds: 8

Events
Singles	men	women		boys	girls
Doubles	men	women	mixed	boys	girls
← 1973 ·	Wimbledon Championships	· 1975 →

Jimmy Connors and Ilie Năstase were the defending champions, but lost in the semifinals to John Newcombe and Tony Roche.

Newcombe and Roche defeated Bob Lutz and Stan Smith in the final, 8–6, 6–4, 6–4 to win the gentlemen's doubles title at the 1974 Wimbledon Championships.

== Seeds ==
1. (United States) Jimmy Connors / (Romania) Ilie Năstase (semifinals)
2. (South Africa) Bob Hewitt / (South Africa) Frew McMillan (second round)
3. (United States) Bob Lutz / (United States) Stan Smith (final)
4. (Australia) John Newcombe / (Australia) Tony Roche (champions)
5. (United States) Arthur Ashe / (United States) Roscoe Tanner (third round)
6. (Australia) Owen Davidson / (Australia) Ken Rosewall (second round)
7. (South Africa) Cliff Drysdale / (Netherlands) Tom Okker (semifinals)
8. (Australia) John Alexander / (Australia) Phil Dent (quarterfinals)

Click on the seed number of a player to go to their draw section.

== Draw ==
=== Key ===
- Q = Qualifier
- WC = Wild card
- LL = Lucky loser
- Alt = Alternate
- ITF = ITF entry
- PR = Protected ranking
- SR = Special ranking
- SE = Special exempt
- JE = Junior exempt
- JR = Junior Accelerator Programme entrant
- CO = College Accelerator Programme entrant
- NG = Next Gen Accelerator Program entrant
- w/o = Walkover
- r = Retired
- d = Defaulted

=== Finals ===
Quarterfinals
1	(United States) Jimmy Connors (Romania) Ilie Năstase	3	9	6	8
8	(Australia) John Alexander (Australia) Phil Dent	6	8	3	6
4	(Australia) John Newcombe (Australia) Tony Roche	6	3	6	6
(West Germany) Jürgen Fassbender (West Germany) Karl Meiler	2	6	3	3
(United States) Charlie Pasarell (United States) Erik van Dillen	5	3	2
3	(United States) Bob Lutz (United States) Stan Smith	7	6	6
7	(South Africa) Cliff Drysdale (Netherlands) Tom Okker	8	6	3	6
(United States) Brian Gottfried (Mexico) Raúl Ramírez	6	4	6	3

Semifinals
1	(United States) Jimmy Connors (Romania) Ilie Năstase	6	6	3	2	4
4	(Australia) John Newcombe (Australia) Tony Roche	3	4	6	6	6
3	(United States) Bob Lutz (United States) Stan Smith	3	6	7	9
7	(South Africa) Cliff Drysdale (Netherlands) Tom Okker	6	1	5	7

Final
4	(Australia) John Newcombe (Australia) Tony Roche	8	6	6
3	(United States) Bob Lutz (United States) Stan Smith	6	4	4

=== Top half ===
==== Section 1 ====
First round
1	(United States) J Connors (Romania) I Năstase	6	6	8
(India) A Amritraj (India) V Amritraj	3	4	6
(United States) P Gerken (United States) R Stockton	7	4	6	8	2
(Soviet Union) T Kakulia (Soviet Union) A Metreveli	9	6	4	6	6
(India) P Lall (India) J Mukerjea	6	9	6
(United States) C Graebner (United States) D Ralston	3	8	4
(Australia) C Dibley (Egypt) I El Shafei
(United States) M Estep (United Kingdom) C Mottram	w/o
8	(Australia) J Alexander (Australia) P Dent	6	6	7
(South Africa) B Mitton (South Africa) D Schneider	3	4	5
(United States) R Dell (United States) S Stewart	9	4	8	6
(Austria) H Kary (Australia) P Kronk	7	6	6	4
(Japan) K Hirai (Japan) T Sakai	6	4	8	6	4
(United States) W Martin (United States) E Scott	4	6	9	4	6
(France) P Dominguez (France) W N'Godrella	8	2	6	3
(Australia) S Ball (Australia) R Giltinan	9	6	4	6

Second round
1	(United States) J Connors (Romania) I Năstase	4	6	6	8
(Soviet Union) T Kakulia (Soviet Union) A Metreveli	6	3	1	6
(India) P Lall (India) J Mukerjea	3	4	2
(Australia) C Dibley (Egypt) I El Shafei	6	6	6
8	(Australia) J Alexander (Australia) P Dent	6	8	6
(United States) R Dell (United States) S Stewart	4	6	4
(United States) W Martin (United States) E Scott	6	6	4	8	4
(Australia) S Ball (Australia) R Giltinan	3	4	6	9	6

Third round
1	(United States) J Connors (Romania) I Năstase	7	6	6
(Australia) C Dibley (Egypt) I El Shafei	5	2	4
8	(Australia) J Alexander (Australia) P Dent	8	1	6	6	6
(Australia) S Ball (Australia) R Giltinan	9	6	3	4	4

Quarterfinals
1	(United States) J Connors (Romania) I Năstase	3	9	6	8
8	(Australia) J Alexander (Australia) P Dent	6	8	3	6

==== Section 2 ====
First round
4	(Australia) J Newcombe (Australia) A Roche	6	6	4	6
Q	(Australia) R Keldie (South Africa) R Seegers	2	3	6	3
(South Africa) R Maud (United Kingdom) R Taylor	4	6	9	6
(Argentina) M Vázquez (Argentina) G Vilas	6	1	8	3
(Spain) J Higueras (Spain) M Orantes	6	6	1	6
(United States) T Gorman (United States) M Riessen	3	4	6	3
(Hungary) S Baranyi (Hungary) P Szőke	8	9	8	3
(United States) V Gerulaitis (United States) A Mayer	9	8	9	6
5	(United States) A Ashe (United States) R Tanner	6	6	6
(Australia) R Crealy (New Zealand) O Parun	2	3	4
(Australia) I Fletcher (Australia) K Warwick	4	6	2	6
(Colombia) I Molina (Colombia) J Velasco	6	2	6	8
(France) P Barthès (France) F Jauffret	w/o
(West Germany) J Fassbender (West Germany) K Meiler
Q	(Rhodesia) C Dowdeswell (South Africa) J Yuill	6	6	9
(United Kingdom) G Battrick (United Kingdom) G Stilwell	4	3	8

Second round
4	(Australia) J Newcombe (Australia) A Roche	4	8	6	6	10
(South Africa) R Maud (United Kingdom) R Taylor	6	9	2	4	8
(Spain) J Higueras (Spain) M Orantes	5	2	4
(United States) V Gerulaitis (United States) A Mayer	7	6	6
5	(United States) A Ashe (United States) R Tanner	6	6	9
(Colombia) I Molina (Colombia) J Velasco	4	1	8
(West Germany) J Fassbender (West Germany) K Meiler	6	2	6	6
Q	(Rhodesia) C Dowdeswell (South Africa) J Yuill	4	6	2	3

Third round
4	(Australia) J Newcombe (Australia) A Roche	2	6	7	9
(United States) V Gerulaitis (United States) A Mayer	6	3	5	8
5	(United States) A Ashe (United States) R Tanner	3	5	6
(West Germany) J Fassbender (West Germany) K Meiler	6	7	8

Quarterfinals
4	(Australia) J Newcombe (Australia) A Roche	6	3	6	6
(West Germany) J Fassbender (West Germany) K Meiler	2	6	3	3

=== Bottom half ===
==== Section 3 ====
First round
Q	(Venezuela) J Andrew (United States) S Krulevitz	6	6	6
Q	(France) T Bernasconi (France) J-L Haillet	4	4	4
(Chile) P Cornejo (Chile) J Fillol	6	6	6	4	3
(United Kingdom) J Feaver (United Kingdom) S Warboys	2	8	3	6	6
(United States) C Pasarell (United States) E van Dillen	6	3	8	6
(France) J-B Chanfreau (France) G Goven	3	6	6	4
(Australia) R Case (Australia) G Masters	3	4	4
6	(Australia) O Davidson (Australia) K Rosewall	6	6	6
(United States) J Borowiak (United States) J McManus	2	9	9	3	6
(United Kingdom) D Lloyd (United Kingdom) J Paish	6	8	8	6	4
(United States) M Machette (United States) G Reid	6	6	6
(Sweden) K Johansson (Sweden) L Johansson	2	4	4
Q	(South Africa) R Krog (South Africa) D Schroder	2	3	6	5
Q	(West Germany) H-J Plötz (Chile) B Prajoux	6	6	3	7
(Sweden) O Bengtson (Sweden) B Borg	7	0	1	4
3	(United States) R Lutz (United States) S Smith	5	6	6	6

Second round
Q	(Venezuela) J Andrew (United States) S Krulevitz	3	4	6	6	7
(United Kingdom) J Feaver (United Kingdom) S Warboys	6	6	1	3	5
(United States) C Pasarell (United States) E van Dillen	4	6	4	6	6
6	(Australia) O Davidson (Australia) K Rosewall	6	4	6	3	4
(United States) J Borowiak (United States) J McManus	6	9	6
(United States) M Machette (United States) G Reid	0	7	1
Q	(West Germany) H-J Plötz (Chile) B Prajoux	6	3	4	7	4
3	(United States) R Lutz (United States) S Smith	4	6	6	5	6

Third round
Q	(Venezuela) J Andrew (United States) S Krulevitz	3	2	6	3
(United States) C Pasarell (United States) E van Dillen	6	6	3	6
(United States) J Borowiak (United States) J McManus	3	1	3
3	(United States) R Lutz (United States) S Smith	6	6	6

Quarterfinals
(United States) C Pasarell (United States) E van Dillen	5	3	2
3	(United States) R Lutz (United States) S Smith	7	6	6

==== Section 4 ====
First round
(United Kingdom) M Cox (Japan) J Kamiwazumi	7	6	9
(United States) E Dibbs (United States) H Solomon	5	1	8
(Brazil) C Kirmayr (Brazil) T Koch	6	6	9
(Czechoslovakia) J Hřebec (Czechoslovakia) F Pála	3	4	7
(Australia) N Fraser (Australia) L Hoad	6	8	6
Q	(United Kingdom) J Clifton (United Kingdom) J Smith	3	6	3
(West Germany) H Elschenbroich (West Germany) H-J Pohmann	6	3	2	6
7	(South Africa) C Drysdale (Netherlands) T Okker	4	6	6	8
Q	(United States) S Faulk (United States) J Fort	2	3	9	8
(Italy) A Panatta (Italy) N Pietrangeli	6	6	8	9
(South Africa) R Moore (Australia) B Phillips-Moore	4	1	8	6
(Czechoslovakia) J Kodeš (Czechoslovakia) V Zedník	6	6	6	8
(United Kingdom) M Farrell (United Kingdom) J Lloyd	4	4	6	3
(United States) B Gottfried (Mexico) R Ramírez	6	6	3	6
(South Africa) B Bertram (Rhodesia) A Pattison	9	0	2	1
2	(South Africa) R Hewitt (South Africa) F McMillan	7	6	6	6

Second round
(United Kingdom) M Cox (Japan) J Kamiwazumi	6	6	1	4	5
(Brazil) C Kirmayr (Brazil) T Koch	4	4	6	6	7
(Australia) N Fraser (Australia) L Hoad	1	6	8	2
7	(South Africa) C Drysdale (Netherlands) T Okker	6	3	9	6
(Italy) A Panatta (Italy) N Pietrangeli	8	5	3
(Czechoslovakia) J Kodeš (Czechoslovakia) V Zedník	9	7	6
(United States) B Gottfried (Mexico) R Ramírez	6	9	3	7
2	(South Africa) R Hewitt (South Africa) F McMillan	1	7	6	5

Third round
(Brazil) C Kirmayr (Brazil) T Koch	6	7	6	2
7	(South Africa) C Drysdale (Netherlands) T Okker	4	9	8	6
(Czechoslovakia) J Kodeš (Czechoslovakia) V Zedník	5	6	8	5
(United States) B Gottfried (Mexico) R Ramírez	7	8	6	7

Quarterfinals
7	(South Africa) C Drysdale (Netherlands) T Okker	8	6	3	6
(United States) B Gottfried (Mexico) R Ramírez	6	4	6	3
