= Freddy Blatter =

Swiss tennis player

- Country (sports): Switzerland
- Born: 25 September 1949 (age 76) Zürich, Switzerland

Doubles

Grand Slam doubles results
- Australian Open: 3R (1974)

Fred Blatter (born 25 September 1949) is a Swiss former professional tennis player.

Born in Zürich, Blatter was a Davis Cup player for Switzerland, with an appearance in a tie against Romania in Bucharest in 1972. He competed in the doubles rubber against Ilie Năstase and Ion Țiriac, as well as a dead rubber singles against Petre Mărmureanu, losing both.

Blatter featured in the men's doubles main draw at the 1974 Australian Open, where he and his Swiss partner Petr Kanderal made it to the third round.

== See also ==
- List of Switzerland Davis Cup team representatives
