= 1974 Wimbledon Championships – Boys' singles =

Boys' singles
- 1974 Wimbledon Championships

Final
- Champion: (United States) Billy Martin
- Runner-up: (India) Ashok Amritraj
- Score: 6–2, 6–1

Events
Singles	men	women		boys	girls
Doubles	men	women	mixed	boys	girls
← 1973 ·	Wimbledon Championships	· 1975 →

Billy Martin successfully defended his title, defeating Ashok Amritraj in the final, 6–2, 6–1 to win the boys' singles tennis title at the 1974 Wimbledon Championships.

== Draw ==
=== Key ===
- Q = Qualifier
- WC = Wild card
- LL = Lucky loser
- Alt = Alternate
- SE = Special exempt
- PR = Protected ranking
- ITF = ITF entry
- JE = Junior exempt
- w/o = Walkover
- r = Retired
- d = Defaulted
- SR = Special ranking

=== Finals ===
Quarterfinals
(United States) Billy Martin	6	6
(Czechoslovakia) Tomáš Šmíd	4	1
(Brazil) Luis Carlos Enck	7	8
(France) Christophe Casa	9	9
(United Kingdom) Tony Lloyd	9	9
(Sweden) Göran Berglund	7	7
(New Zealand) Chris Lewis	2	3
(India) Ashok Amritraj	6	6

Semifinals
(United States) Billy Martin	6	6
(France) Christophe Casa	2	3
(United Kingdom) Tony Lloyd	4	2
(India) Ashok Amritraj	6	6

Final
(United States) Billy Martin	6	6
(India) Ashok Amritraj	2	1

=== Top half ===
==== Section 1 ====
First round

Second round
(Austria) P Groer	1	0
(United States) Billy Martin	6	6
(Denmark) F Christensen
(Ghana) J Atiso	w/o
(Republic of Ireland) R Gibney	4	1
(South Africa) Johnny Muller	6	6
(Belgium) Thierry Stevaux	8	6	4
(Czechoslovakia) Tomáš Šmíd	9	4	6

Third round
(United States) W Martin	6	6
(Denmark) F Christensen	3	1
(South Africa) J Muller	1	3
(Czechoslovakia) T Šmíd	6	6

Quarterfinals
(United States) W Martin	6	6
(Czechoslovakia) T Šmíd	4	1

==== Section 2 ====
First round
(Argentina) Carlos Landó
(Colombia) Gabriel Monroy	w/o

Second round
(Brazil) Luis Carlos Enck	6	6
(Australia) David Carter	2	1
(Netherlands) J Buise	6	6
(Egypt) Hisham Nasser	3	0
(Trinidad and Tobago) A Morean	0	1
(France) Christophe Casa	6	6
(Finland) Leo Palin	9	8
(Argentina) C Landó	7	6

Third round
(Brazil) LC Enck	6	6
(Netherlands) J Buise	4	4
(France) C Casa	3	6	7
(Finland) L Palin	6	2	5

Quarterfinals
(Brazil) LC Enck	7	8
(France) C Casa	9	9

=== Bottom half ===
==== Section 3 ====
First round
(Nigeria) Nduka Odizor	w/o
(Norway) P Hagen

Second round
(Norway) P Hagen
(Socialist Federal Republic of Yugoslavia) Miloš Dimitrijević	w/o
(Israel) Shlomo Glickstein	6	1	1
(United Kingdom) Tony Lloyd	4	6	6
(Sri Lanka) Arjun Fernando	3	4
(West Germany) Uli Marten	6	6
(Pakistan) A Khan	0	4
(Sweden) Göran Berglund	6	6

Third round
(Norway) P Hagen	1	1
(United Kingdom) A Lloyd	6	6
(West Germany) U Marten	6	1	5
(Sweden) G Berglund	3	6	7

Quarterfinals
(United Kingdom) A Lloyd	9	9
(Sweden) G Berglund	7	7

==== Section 4 ====
First round

Second round
(Switzerland) Markus Günthardt	0	2
(New Zealand) Chris Lewis	6	6
(Sudan) OMO Abasi	0	1
(Spain) Miguel Mir	6	6
(Canada) Robert Bettauer	1	0
(India) Ashok Amritraj	6	6
(Italy) Federico Bini	3	7	6
(Singapore) M Hassan	6	5	2

Third round
(New Zealand) C Lewis	4	6	6
(Spain) M Mir	6	1	0
(India) A Amritraj	6	6
(Italy) F Bini	4	4

Quarterfinals
(New Zealand) C Lewis	2	3
(India) A Amritraj	6	6
