= 1974 Wimbledon Championships – Girls' singles =

Girls' singles
- 1974 Wimbledon Championships

Final
- Champion: (Socialist Federal Republic of Yugoslavia) Mima Jaušovec
- Runner-up: (Romania) Mariana Simionescu
- Score: 7–5, 6–4

Details
- Draw: 25

Events
Singles	men	women		boys	girls
Doubles	men	women	mixed	boys	girls
← 1973 ·	Wimbledon Championships	· 1975 →

Mima Jaušovec defeated Mariana Simionescu in the final, 7–5, 6–4 to win the girls' singles tennis title at the 1974 Wimbledon Championships.

== Draw ==
=== Key ===
- Q = Qualifier
- WC = Wild card
- LL = Lucky loser
- Alt = Alternate
- SE = Special exempt
- PR = Protected ranking
- ITF = ITF entry
- JE = Junior exempt
- w/o = Walkover
- r = Retired
- d = Defaulted
- SR = Special ranking

=== Finals ===
Semifinals
(Australia) Chris O'Neil	4	3
(Romania) Mariana Simionescu	6	6
(United Kingdom) Sue Barker	4	4
(Socialist Federal Republic of Yugoslavia) Mima Jaušovec	6	6

Final
(Romania) Mariana Simionescu	5	4
(Socialist Federal Republic of Yugoslavia) Mima Jaušovec	7	6

=== Top half ===
First round
(Israel) R Heller	1	4
(Switzerland) Annemarie Rüegg	6	6
(Republic of Ireland) Bernadette Davy	0	4
(United States) Kathy May	6	6
(Spain) María Mateo	3	4
(Romania) Mariana Simionescu	6	6
(South Africa) Linky Boshoff	w/o
(Belgium) A Gerain
(Brazil) Léa Rios de Almeida	4	6	4
(West Germany) Inge Pohmann	6	3	6

Second round
(Austria) E Celigoj	0	4
(Czechoslovakia) Regina Maršíková	6	6
(Australia) Chris O'Neil	6	6
(Switzerland) A Rüegg	2	0
(United States) K May	4	7	4
(Romania) M Simionescu	6	5	6
(Belgium) A Gerain	4	2
(West Germany) I Pohmann	6	6

Quarterfinals
(Czechoslovakia) R Maršíková	6	4
(Australia) C O'Neil	8	6
(Romania) M Simionescu	3	6	6
(West Germany) I Pohmann	6	1	4

Semifinals
(Australia) C O'Neil	4	3
(Romania) M Simionescu	6	6

=== Bottom half ===
First round
(United Kingdom) Sue Barker	6	6
(Argentina) Adriana Villagrán	2	2
(Mexico) Jeannine Balbiers	9	3	6
(Norway) E Torkildsen	7	6	3
(Sweden) Helena Anliot	6	6
(Finland) Elina Durchman	1	0
(Canada) DA Mushlian	6	3	2
(Netherlands) B Sluyter	4	6	6

Second round
(United Kingdom) S Barker	6	6
(Mexico) J Balbiers	1	1
(Sweden) H Anliot	6	6
(Netherlands) B Sluyter	0	4
(Socialist Federal Republic of Yugoslavia) Mima Jaušovec	6	6
(United Arab Emirates) Hoda Baligh	0	0
(France) Christine Gimmig	3	3
(Denmark) Helle Sparre	6	6

Quarterfinals
(United Kingdom) S Barker	6	6
(Sweden) H Anliot	4	1
(Socialist Federal Republic of Yugoslavia) M Jaušovec	6	6
(Denmark) H Sparre	3	4

Semifinals
(United Kingdom) S Barker	4	4
(Socialist Federal Republic of Yugoslavia) M Jaušovec	6	6
