= Alexandre Strambini =

Swiss tennis player

- Full name: Alexandre Strambini
- Country (sports): Switzerland
- Born: 16 May 1975 (age 50)
- Prize money: $38,972

Singles
- Career record: 1-2
- Career titles: 0
- Highest ranking: No. 215 (23 June 1997)

Doubles
- Career record: 1-2
- Career titles: 0
- Highest ranking: No. 275 (16 June 1997)

Alexandre Strambini (born 16 May 1975) is a former professional tennis player from Switzerland.

== Biography ==
Strambini was born into a Swiss family with deep roots in the watch industry. His grandfather was a matchmaker and in 1983 his father Victor bought local watch company Edox from The Swatch Group.

As a junior, Strambini made the quarter-finals of the 1993 Wimbledon Championships.

Strambini represented the Switzerland Davis Cup team in a 1996 World Group tie against Germany at the Palexpo centre in Geneva. He partnered with Jakob Hlasek for the doubles, a loss to David Prinosil and Michael Stich that gave Germany the tie. In the reverse singles he replaced Marc Rosset for a dead rubber, which he lost to Prinosil.

His only main draw appearance on the ATP Tour came at the 1996 Rado Open in Gstaad, where he featured in both the singles and doubles events. He made the second round of the singles, eliminated by Spaniard Francisco Clavet, having earlier defeated fellow wildcard Patrick Mohr, who he partnered with in the doubles to make the quarter-finals.

In 1997 he defeated Roger Federer twice in the space of a week, at a Swiss satellite tournament. He is known to be a close friend of Federer.

Strambini is now himself involved in the watch industry, as the CEO of Edox.

== See also ==
- List of Switzerland Davis Cup team representatives
