= 1974 Wimbledon Championships – Women's doubles =

Women's doubles
- 1974 Wimbledon Championships

Final
- Champions: (Australia) Evonne Goolagong (United States) Peggy Michel
- Runners-up: (Australia) Helen Gourlay (Australia) Karen Krantzcke
- Score: 2–6, 6–4, 6–3

Details
- Draw: 48 (3 Q )
- Seeds: 4

Events
Singles	men	women		boys	girls
Doubles	men	women	mixed	boys	girls
← 1973 ·	Wimbledon Championships	· 1975 →

Rosie Casals and Billie Jean King were the defending champions, but lost in the quarterfinals to Helen Gourlay and Karen Krantzcke.

Evonne Goolagong and Peggy Michel defeated Gourlay and Krantzcke in the final, 2–6, 6–4, 6–3 to win the ladies' doubles tennis title at the 1974 Wimbledon Championships.

== Seeds ==
1. (United States) Rosie Casals / (United States) Billie Jean King (quarterfinals)
2. (France) Françoise Dürr / (Netherlands) Betty Stöve (quarterfinals)
3. (United States) Chris Evert / (Soviet Union) Olga Morozova (semifinals)
4. (United States) Julie Heldman / (United Kingdom) Virginia Wade (quarterfinals)

Click on the seed number of a player to go to their draw section.

== Draw ==
=== Key ===
- Q = Qualifier
- WC = Wild card
- LL = Lucky loser
- Alt = Alternate
- SE = Special exempt
- PR = Protected ranking
- ITF = ITF entry
- JE = Junior exempt
- w/o = Walkover
- r = Retired
- d = Defaulted
- SR = Special ranking

=== Finals ===
Quarterfinals
1	(United States) Rosie Casals (United States) Billie Jean King	3	6	4
(Australia) Helen Gourlay (Australia) Karen Krantzcke	6	3	6
4	(United States) Julie Heldman (United Kingdom) Virginia Wade	1	9	0
(United States) Julie Anthony (United States) Mona Schallau	6	7	6
(United Kingdom) Lesley Charles (United Kingdom) Sue Mappin	3	7
3	(United States) Chris Evert (Soviet Union) Olga Morozova	6	9
(Australia) Evonne Goolagong (United States) Peggy Michel	6	6
2	(France) Françoise Dürr (Netherlands) Betty Stöve	2	4

Semifinals
(Australia) Helen Gourlay (Australia) Karen Krantzcke	9	6
(United States) Julie Anthony (United States) Mona Schallau	8	2
3	(United States) Chris Evert (Soviet Union) Olga Morozova	5	2
(Australia) Evonne Goolagong (United States) Peggy Michel	7	6

Final
(Australia) Helen Gourlay (Australia) Karen Krantzcke	6	4	3
(Australia) Evonne Goolagong (United States) Peggy Michel	2	6	6

=== Top half ===
==== Section 1 ====
First round

Second round
1	(United States) R Casals (United States) BJ King	1	6	6
(United Kingdom) S Barker (United Kingdom) G Coles	6	3	0
(France) G Chanfreau (Italy) A-M Nasuelli	6	6
(Australia) C O'Neil (Australia) J Walker	3	4
Q	(Australia) D Evers (Australia) N Gregory	6	2	6
(Indonesia) L Kaligis (United Kingdom) P Moor	4	6	2
(Argentina) R Giscafré (Sweden) C Sandberg	2	2
(Australia) H Gourlay (Australia) K Krantzcke	6	6

Third round
1	(United States) R Casals (United States) BJ King	6	6
(France) G Chanfreau (Italy) A-M Nasuelli	2	3
Q	(Australia) D Evers (Australia) N Gregory	5	0
(Australia) H Gourlay (Australia) K Krantzcke	7	6

Quarterfinals
1	(United States) R Casals (United States) BJ King	3	6	4
(Australia) H Gourlay (Australia) K Krantzcke	6	3	6

==== Section 2 ====
First round
4	(United States) J Heldman (United Kingdom) V Wade	6	6
(United States) P Hogan (United States) S Walsh	2	4
(Czechoslovakia) A Palmeová-West (Czechoslovakia) V Vopičková
(United States) S Greer (United States) N Ornstein	w/o
(Netherlands) E Appel (Netherlands) M Schaar	2	7	6
(United Kingdom) S Brasher (United Kingdom) C Janes	6	5	4
(Soviet Union) M Kroschina (Czechoslovakia) M Neumannová	6	0	6
(Italy) L Bassi (Italy) L Pericoli	4	6	4
(Australia) D Fromholtz (Australia) J Young	7	4	3
(United States) K May (South Africa) G Stevens	5	6	6
(France) F Guédy (Denmark) A-M Sørensen	2	5
(United Kingdom) J Fayter (Israel) P Peisachov	6	7
(Romania) V Ruzici (Romania) M Simionescu	4	6	6
(United States) J Evert (United Kingdom) L Mottram	6	4	8
(United States) P Bostrom (United States) W Overton	6	0
(United States) J Anthony (United States) M Schallau	8	6

Second round
4	(United States) J Heldman (United Kingdom) V Wade	6	6
(United States) S Greer (United States) N Ornstein	2	3
(Netherlands) E Appel (Netherlands) M Schaar	2	6	8
(Soviet Union) M Kroschina (Czechoslovakia) M Neumannová	6	1	10
(United States) K May (South Africa) G Stevens	6	6
(United Kingdom) J Fayter (Israel) P Peisachov	3	1
(United States) J Evert (United Kingdom) L Mottram	1	1
(United States) J Anthony (United States) M Schallau	6	6

Third round
4	(United States) J Heldman (United Kingdom) V Wade	6	6
(Soviet Union) M Kroschina (Czechoslovakia) M Neumannová	0	1
(United States) K May (South Africa) G Stevens	3	3
(United States) J Anthony (United States) M Schallau	6	6

Quarterfinals
4	(United States) J Heldman (United Kingdom) V Wade	1	9	0
(United States) J Anthony (United States) M Schallau	6	7	6

=== Bottom half ===
==== Section 3 ====
First round
(United Kingdom) L Charles (United Kingdom) S Mappin	6	3	6
(Czechoslovakia) M Navrátilová (Czechoslovakia) R Tomanová	3	6	2
(Japan) K Fukuoka (Japan) K Sawamatsu	6	1	7
(Uruguay) F Bonicelli (South Africa) L Rossouw	4	6	5
(Romania) J Gohn (Hungary) É Szabó
(Belgium) M Gurdal (Belgium) M Van Haver	w/o
(United States) K Kemmer (United States) V Ziegenfuss	6	9
(South Africa) B Cuypers (South Africa) R Whitehouse	2	7
(United States) A Kiyomura (United States) E Nagelsen	6	6
Q	(United States) S Barman (United States) M Christenson	3	2
(United Kingdom) L Blachford (United Kingdom) V Burton	5	2
Q	(Socialist Federal Republic of Yugoslavia) M Jaušovec (United States) L Tenney	7	6
(United Kingdom) L Beaven (United Kingdom) J Helliar	7	6
(United Kingdom) A Coe (United Kingdom) C Molesworth	5	1
(United States) T Fretz (United States) C Martinez	3	5
3	(United States) C Evert (Soviet Union) O Morozova	6	7

Second round
(United Kingdom) L Charles (United Kingdom) S Mappin	1	6	7
(Japan) K Fukuoka (Japan) K Sawamatsu	6	2	5
(Belgium) M Gurdal (Belgium) M Van Haver	3	5
(United States) K Kemmer (United States) V Ziegenfuss	6	7
(United States) A Kiyomura (United States) E Nagelsen	6	6
Q	(Socialist Federal Republic of Yugoslavia) M Jaušovec (United States) L Tenney	2	4
(United Kingdom) L Beaven (United Kingdom) J Helliar	2	0
3	(United States) C Evert (Soviet Union) O Morozova	6	6

Third round
(United Kingdom) L Charles (United Kingdom) S Mappin	9	7
(United States) K Kemmer (United States) V Ziegenfuss	7	5
(United States) A Kiyomura (United States) E Nagelsen	4	5
3	(United States) C Evert (Soviet Union) O Morozova	6	7

Quarterfinals
(United Kingdom) L Charles (United Kingdom) S Mappin	3	7
3	(United States) C Evert (Soviet Union) O Morozova	6	9

==== Section 4 ====
First round

Second round
(Australia) E Goolagong (United States) M Michel	6	6
LL	(Rhodesia) S Hudson-Beck (Republic of Ireland) S Minford	2	1
(United Kingdom) J Griffiths (United Kingdom) D Riste	3	5
(Australia) K Harris (Australia) L Hunt	6	7
(United States) K Latham (United States) C Meyer	1	1
(South Africa) D Boshoff (South Africa) I Kloss	6	6
(United Kingdom) J Hume (United Kingdom) W Wooldridge	2	6	4
2	(France) F Dürr (Netherlands) B Stöve	6	4	6

Third round
(Australia) E Goolagong (United States) M Michel	6	6
(Australia) K Harris (Australia) L Hunt	2	4
(South Africa) D Boshoff (South Africa) I Kloss	6	3	4
2	(France) F Dürr (Netherlands) B Stöve	2	6	6

Quarterfinals
(Australia) E Goolagong (United States) M Michel	6	6
2	(France) F Dürr (Netherlands) B Stöve	2	4
