= 1996 Rado Open =

- Date: 8–14 July
- Edition: 51st
- Category: World Series
- Draw: 32S / 16D
- Prize money: $525,000
- Surface: Clay / outdoor
- Location: Gstaad, Switzerland
- Venue: Roy Emerson Arena

Champions

Singles
- (Spain) Albert Costa

Doubles
- (Czech Republic) Jiří Novák / (Czech Republic) Pavel Vízner
- Swiss Open

The 1996 Rado Open, also known as the Swiss Open, was a men's tennis tournament played on outdoor clay courts at the Roy Emerson Arena in Gstaad, Switzerland and was part of the World Series category of the 1996 ATP Tour. It was the 51st edition of the tournament and was held from 8 July until 14 July 1996. Sixth-seeded Albert Costa won the singles title.

== Finals ==
=== Singles ===
(Spain) Albert Costa defeated (Spain) Félix Mantilla 4–6, 7–6^{(7–2)}, 6–1, 6–0

- It was Costa's 1st singles title of the year and the 2nd of his career.

=== Doubles ===
(Czech Republic) Jiří Novák / (Czech Republic) Pavel Vízner defeated (United States) Trevor Kronemann / (Australia) David Macpherson 4–6, 7–6, 7–6

- It was Novák's 2nd and last doubles title of the year and the 4th of his career. It was Vízner's 3rd and last doubles title of the year and the 3rd of his career.
