= 1974 Wimbledon Championships – Men's singles =

Men's singles
- 1974 Wimbledon Championships

Final
- Champion: (United States) Jimmy Connors
- Runner-up: (Australia) Ken Rosewall
- Score: 6–1, 6–1, 6–4

Details
- Draw: 128 (16 Q )
- Seeds: 12

Events
Singles	men	women		boys	girls
Doubles	men	women	mixed	boys	girls
← 1973 ·	Wimbledon Championships	· 1975 →

Jimmy Connors defeated Ken Rosewall in the final, 6–1, 6–1, 6–4 to win the gentlemen's singles tennis title at the 1974 Wimbledon Championships. It was his first Wimbledon title and second major title overall. Rosewall was attempting to complete the career Grand Slam.

Jan Kodeš was the defending champion, but lost in the quarterfinals to Connors.

Uniquely, due to the WCT ban in place at the 1972 championships and the ATP boycott of 1973, three unofficial 'defending champions' competed in the event. John Newcombe, Stan Smith and Kodeš were all unbeaten from their last singles matches at the championships when this year's event commenced. Newcombe and Smith were both defeated by Rosewall, in the quarterfinals and semifinals, respectively.

== Seeds ==
1. (Australia) John Newcombe (quarterfinals)
2. (Romania) Ilie Năstase (fourth round)
3. (United States) Jimmy Connors (champion)
4. (United States) Stan Smith (semifinals)
5. (Sweden) Björn Borg (third round)
6. (Czechoslovakia) Jan Kodeš (quarterfinals)
7. (Netherlands) Tom Okker (fourth round)
8. (United States) Arthur Ashe (third round)
9. (Australia) Ken Rosewall (final)
10. (Soviet Union) Alex Metreveli (quarterfinals)
11. (United States) Tom Gorman (fourth round)
12. (Spain) Manuel Orantes (fourth round)

Click on the seed number of a player to go to their draw section.

== Draw ==
=== Key ===
- Q = Qualifier
- WC = Wild card
- LL = Lucky loser
- Alt = Alternate
- ITF = ITF entry
- PR = Protected ranking
- SR = Special ranking
- SE = Special exempt
- JE = Junior exempt
- JR = Junior Accelerator Programme entrant
- CO = College Accelerator Programme entrant
- NG = Next Gen Accelerator Program entrant
- w/o = Walkover
- r = Retired
- d = Defaulted

=== Finals ===
Quarterfinals
1	(Australia) John Newcombe	1	6	0	5
9	(Australia) Ken Rosewall	6	1	6	7
4	(United States) Stan Smith	9	7	6	7
(Egypt) Ismail El Shafei	8	5	8	5
6	(Czechoslovakia) Jan Kodeš	6	3	3	8	3
3	(United States) Jimmy Connors	3	6	6	6	6
10	(Soviet Union) Alex Metreveli	4	5	1
(United States) Dick Stockton	6	7	6

Semifinals
9	(Australia) Ken Rosewall	6	4	9	6	6
4	(United States) Stan Smith	8	6	8	1	3
3	(United States) Jimmy Connors	4	6	6	6
(United States) Dick Stockton	6	2	3	4

Final
9	(Australia) Ken Rosewall	1	1	4
3	(United States) Jimmy Connors	6	6	6

=== Top half ===
==== Section 1 ====
First round
1	(Australia) John Newcombe	6	6	8
(France) Georges Goven	3	2	6
Q	(South Africa) Bernard Mitton	4	3	5
(Australia) Geoff Masters	6	6	7
(Socialist Federal Republic of Yugoslavia) Nikola Pilić	4	6	6	6
(United States) Mike Estep	6	3	4	2
Q	(West Germany) Hans-Joachim Plötz	6	1	4	2
(United States) Eddie Dibbs	2	6	6	6
(Czechoslovakia) Vladimír Zedník	2	8	4
(Argentina) Guillermo Vilas	6	9	6
(United States) Marty Riessen	6	6	7
(Poland) Tadeusz Nowicki	2	4	5
(West Germany) Harald Elschenbroich	7	6	6
(Brazil) José Edison Mandarino	5	2	1
(United States) Erik van Dillen	7	6	4	7	6
(India) Jasjit Singh	9	3	6	5	3

Second round
1	(Australia) J Newcombe	9	6	8
(Australia) G Masters	8	3	6
(Socialist Federal Republic of Yugoslavia) N Pilić	6	8	6
(United States) E Dibbs	4	6	4
(Argentina) G Vilas	7	6	6	3	6
(United States) M Riessen	9	1	4	6	1
(West Germany) H Elschenbroich	4	5	4
(United States) E van Dillen	6	7	6

Third round
1	(Australia) J Newcombe	6	7	7
(Socialist Federal Republic of Yugoslavia) N Pilić	2	5	5
(Argentina) G Vilas	3	4	6	5
(United States) E van Dillen	6	6	1	7

Fourth round
1	(Australia) J Newcombe	7	6	6
(United States) E van Dillen	5	3	4

==== Section 2 ====
First round
8	(United States) Arthur Ashe	6	6	6
(Austria) Hans Kary	4	2	4
(Soviet Union) Teimuraz Kakulia	8	6	5	6
(United States) Billy Martin	6	1	7	4
Q	(United States) Dick Dell	4	3	4
(United States) Roscoe Tanner	6	6	6
(United States) Vitas Gerulaitis	8	4	2	1
(West Germany) Karl Meiler	6	6	6	6
9	(Australia) Ken Rosewall	6	6	6
(Australia) Barry Phillips-Moore	4	3	3
(United States) Bob Lutz	5	4	6
(India) Vijay Amritraj	7	6	8
(France) Wanaro N'Godrella	3	6	4	2
(Australia) Bob Giltinan	6	3	6	6
(Mexico) Marcelo Lara	6	6	2	0^{r}
Q	(Switzerland) Petr Kanderal	4	8	6	0

Second round
8	(United States) A Ashe	6	6	6
(Soviet Union) T Kakulia	1	4	3
(United States) R Tanner	8	6	8
(West Germany) K Meiler	6	4	6
9	(Australia) K Rosewall	6	5	9	6
(India) V Amritraj	2	7	8	1
(Australia) R Giltinan	5	8	5
Q	(Switzerland) P Kanderal	7	9	7

Third round
8	(United States) A Ashe	5	3	9	3
(United States) R Tanner	7	6	8	6
9	(Australia) K Rosewall	6	6	6
Q	(Switzerland) P Kanderal	2	3	3

Fourth round
(United States) R Tanner	6	7	3	5
9	(Australia) K Rosewall	2	9	6	7

==== Section 3 ====
First round
4	(United States) Stan Smith	6	6	6
(United States) Raz Reid	3	3	2
(Hungary) Balázs Taróczy	6	6	8	2	4
(South Africa) Bob Maud	4	4	9	6	6
Q	(Australia) Neale Fraser	4	8	7	6	11
(United Kingdom) David Lloyd	6	9	5	4	9
Q	(West Germany) Ulrich Pinner	3	3	8
(United States) Jeff Borowiak	6	6	9
(Romania) Ion Țiriac	3	0	6
(France) Patrice Dominguez	6	6	8
(Chile) Patricio Cornejo	7	9	4	7	3
(Mexico) Raúl Ramírez	9	8	6	5	6
(United States) Butch Seewagen	8	7	8	6	7
(France) Jean-Baptiste Chanfreau	9	5	9	1	9
Q	(France) Éric Deblicker
(Pakistan) Haroon Rahim	w/o

Second round
4	(United States) S Smith	6	6	6
(South Africa) R Maud	4	1	2
Q	(Australia) N Fraser	9	3	6	0^{r}
(United States) J Borowiak	8	6	8	1
(France) P Dominguez	3	9	6	7
(Mexico) R Ramírez	6	7	3	5
(France) J-B Chanfreau	2	7	6	9
Q	(France) É Deblicker	6	5	3	8

Third round
4	(United States) S Smith	8	6	6	8
(United States) J Borowiak	9	3	4	6
(France) P Dominguez	7	6	6
(France) J-B Chanfreau	5	1	4

Fourth round
4	(United States) S Smith	6	6	7
(France) P Dominguez	3	4	5

==== Section 4 ====
First round
5	(Sweden) Björn Borg	6	4	6	6
(United Kingdom) Graham Stilwell	1	6	4	1
(New Zealand) Jeff Simpson	3	8	3
(Australia) Ross Case	6	9	6
(West Germany) Jürgen Fassbender	6	6	7	7
(United Kingdom) Mark Cox	2	4	9	5
(Egypt) Ismail El Shafei	6	4	8	7	9
(New Zealand) Onny Parun	1	6	9	5	7
12	(Spain) Manuel Orantes	6	6	6
(United States) Harold Solomon	3	2	1
Q	(France) Jean-François Caujolle	4	6	6	4	6
(Brazil) Thomaz Koch	6	1	4	6	8
(Australia) Owen Davidson	2	4	5
(Australia) Tony Roche	6	6	7
(Australia) John Alexander	6	7	8
(Hungary) Péter Szőke	2	5	6

Second round
5	(Sweden) B Borg	3	6	8	7
(Australia) R Case	6	1	6	5
(West Germany) J Fassbender	5	6	4
(Egypt) I El Shafei	7	8	6
12	(Spain) M Orantes	6	6	4	6
(Brazil) T Koch	2	4	6	2
(Australia) A Roche	8	6	4	8	6
(Australia) J Alexander	6	4	6	9	3

Third round
5	(Sweden) B Borg	2	3	1
(Egypt) I El Shafei	6	6	6
12	(Spain) M Orantes	2	5	7	6	8
(Australia) A Roche	6	7	5	4	6

Fourth round
(Egypt) I El Shafei	6	3	6	7
12	(Spain) M Orantes	4	6	3	5

=== Bottom half ===
==== Section 5 ====
First round
(South Africa) Frew McMillan	6	7	7	2	4
(United States) Sandy Mayer	3	9	5	6	6
Q	(Netherlands) Rolf Thung	6	6	6
Q	(South Africa) Rayno Seegers	1	4	4
Q	(South Africa) John Yuill	6	6	4	3	6
(Rhodesia) Roger Dowdeswell	3	2	6	6	3
(India) Anand Amritraj	4	5	6	6	6
11	(United States) Tom Gorman	6	7	3	4	8
(Australia) Dick Crealy	4	9	6	9
(United Kingdom) Roger Taylor	6	8	3	8
(South Africa) Bob Hewitt	6	6	2	6
(Chile) Jaime Pinto Bravo	4	1	6	3
(United Kingdom) John Lloyd	3	3	2
(Sweden) Leif Johansson	6	6	6
(United States) Sherwood Stewart	3	4	7
6	(Czechoslovakia) Jan Kodeš	6	6	9

Second round
(United States) A Mayer	7	2	3
Q	(Netherlands) R Thung	9	6	6
Q	(South Africa) J Yuill	3	9	6	3
11	(United States) T Gorman	6	7	8	6
(Australia) R Crealy	2	0	6	6	6
(South Africa) R Hewitt	6	6	4	4	4
(Sweden) L Johansson	6	5	3	6	4
6	(Czechoslovakia) J Kodeš	3	7	6	4	6

Third round
Q	(Netherlands) R Thung	6	1	1
11	(United States) T Gorman	8	6	6
(Australia) R Crealy	6	4	3	6	5
6	(Czechoslovakia) J Kodeš	4	6	6	2	7

Fourth round
11	(United States) T Gorman	8	6	3	7	4
6	(Czechoslovakia) J Kodeš	6	2	6	9	6

==== Section 6 ====
First round
(Italy) Antonio Zugarelli	6	2	3	6	1
(Spain) José Higueras	4	6	6	4	6
(Australia) Kim Warwick	9	7	6
Q	(United States) Armistead Neely	8	5	1
(Chile) Jaime Fillol	6	6	6
Q	(Czechoslovakia) František Pála	4	1	4
LL	(Spain) Juan Ignacio Muntañola	7	8	0
(Argentina) Julián Ganzábal	9	9	6
(West Germany) Hans-Jürgen Pohmann	6	2	3	3
(Italy) Adriano Panatta	4	6	6	6
Q	(Australia) Paul Kronk	3	4	4
(France) Patrick Proisy	6	6	6
(Australia) Colin Dibley	6	6	8	4	9
(Australia) Phil Dent	4	4	9	6	11
(Sweden) Ove Bengtson	1	9	2	4
3	(United States) Jimmy Connors	6	7	6	6

Second round
(Spain) J Higueras	3	0	6
(Australia) K Warwick	6	6	8
(Chile) J Fillol	6	6	6
(Argentina) J Ganzábal	4	3	4
(Italy) A Panatta	6	7	4	6
(France) P Proisy	4	5	6	2
(Australia) P Dent	7	3	6	3	8
3	(United States) J Connors	5	6	3	6	10

Third round
(Australia) K Warwick	3	6	1	4
(Chile) J Fillol	6	4	6	6
(Italy) A Panatta	2	5	2
3	(United States) J Connors	6	7	6

Fourth round
(Chile) J Fillol	3	7	0	1
3	(United States) J Connors	6	5	6	6

==== Section 7 ====
First round
(United Kingdom) John Paish	2	3	8	3
(Rhodesia) Andrew Pattison	6	6	6	6
(Sweden) Kjell Johansson	7	3	6	6	14
(United States) Paul Gerken	9	6	2	1	12
Q	(United States) Steve Krulevitz	6	3	7	4	6
(United States) Bob Kreiss	3	6	5	6	4
(United Kingdom) John Feaver	2	3	6	1
10	(Soviet Union) Alex Metreveli	6	6	3	6
(United States) Jeff Austin	5	6	6	6
(United Kingdom) Mark Farrell	7	3	2	0
(Colombia) Iván Molina	0	3	3
(South Africa) Cliff Drysdale	6	6	6
(Hungary) Szabolcs Baranyi	6	6	6
(France) Pierre Barthès	2	2	0
(United States) Dennis Ralston	1	3	6	3
7	(Netherlands) Tom Okker	6	6	4	6

Second round
(Rhodesia) A Pattison	6	6	6
(Sweden) K Johansson	2	3	4
Q	(United States) S Krulevitz	1	6	3	4
10	(Soviet Union) A Metreveli	6	1	6	6
(United States) J Austin	6	2	4	3
(South Africa) C Drysdale	0	6	6	6
(Hungary) S Baranyi	2	2	4
7	(Netherlands) T Okker	6	6	6

Third round
(Rhodesia) A Pattison	6	4	5	6	3
10	(Soviet Union) A Metreveli	3	6	7	4	6
(South Africa) C Drysdale	6	3	3	3
7	(Netherlands) T Okker	4	6	6	6

Fourth round
10	(Soviet Union) A Metreveli	9	3	6	6
7	(Netherlands) T Okker	8	6	4	2

==== Section 8 ====
First round
Q	(Sweden) Tenny Svensson	8	4	2
(United Kingdom) Gerald Battrick	9	6	6
(Japan) Toshiro Sakai	4	3	2
(United States) Dick Stockton	6	6	6
(United States) Charlie Pasarell	6	0	6	4	6
(United States) Clark Graebner	3	6	3	6	3
(Australia) Syd Ball	4	3	9	3
(United Kingdom) Buster Mottram	6	6	7	6
(Australia) Ian Fletcher	7	3	6	6
(United Kingdom) Stephen Warboys	5	6	3	3
(France) François Jauffret	1	4	6	8	6
(Czechoslovakia) Milan Holeček	6	6	4	6	4
(United States) Brian Gottfried	6	4	7	2	10
(South Africa) Ray Moore	3	6	5	6	8
(Czechoslovakia) Jiří Hřebec	9	3	4	2
2	(Romania) Ilie Năstase	8	6	6	6

Second round
(United Kingdom) G Battrick	6	3	4	6	4
(United States) R Stockton	3	6	6	4	6
(United States) C Pasarell	2	8	7
(United Kingdom) C Mottram	6	9	9
(Australia) I Fletcher	6	6	9
(France) F Jauffret	3	4	7
(United States) B Gottfried	3	2	8
2	(Romania) I Năstase	6	6	9

Third round
(United States) R Stockton
(United Kingdom) C Mottram	w/o
(Australia) I Fletcher	5	3	4
2	(Romania) I Năstase	7	6	6

Fourth round
(United States) R Stockton	5	6	6	9
2	(Romania) I Năstase	7	4	3	8

Preceded by 1974 French Open	Grand Slams; Men's singles	Succeeded by 1974 US Open
