= Rolf Thung =

Dutch tennis player

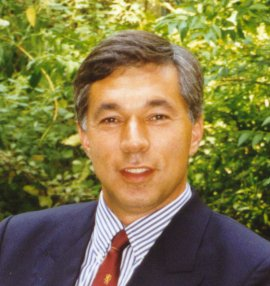
- Thung in 2008
- Full name: Rolf Thung
- Country (sports): Netherlands
- Born: 27 July 1951 (age 73); Naarden, Netherlands
- Height: 1.90 m (6 ft 3 in)
- Plays: Left-handed

Singles
- Career record: 20–65
- Career titles: 0
- Highest ranking: No. 86 (30 April 1975)

Grand Slam singles results
- Wimbledon: 3R (1974)

Doubles
- Career record: 29–56
- Career titles: 1
- Highest ranking: No. 529 (16 July 1984)

Team competitions
- Davis Cup: 6–8

Rolf Thung (born 27 July 1951) is a retired Dutch tennis player. With Louk Sanders, he won the doubles title of the 1978 British Hard Court Championships.

Thung held a win–loss record of 6–8 for the Netherlands Davis Cup team. (Note: Rolf Thung at the Davis Cup)

== Career finals ==
=== Doubles (1 title) ===
Result	W/L	Date	Tournament	Surface	Partner	Opponents	Score
Win	1–0	Sep 1978	Bournemouth, England	Clay	(Netherlands) Louk Sanders	(Australia) David Carter (Australia) Rod Frawley	6–3, 6–4

== Grand Slam performance timelines ==
Key
W	F	SF	QF	#R	RR	Q#	DNQ	A	NH

(W) winner; (F) finalist; (SF) semifinalist; (QF) quarterfinalist; (#R) rounds 4, 3, 2, 1; (RR) round-robin stage; (Q#) qualification round; (DNQ) did not qualify; (A) absent; (NH) not held; (SR) strike rate (events won / competed); (W–L) win–loss record.

=== Singles ===
Tournament	1974	1975	1976	1977
Australian Open	A	A	A	A
French Open	A	1R	A	A
Wimbledon	3R	1R	1R	1R
US Open	A	1R	A	A

=== Doubles ===
Tournament	1975	1976	1977	1979
Australian Open	A	A	A	A
French Open	A	A	A	A
Wimbledon	1R	1R	A	A
US Open	1R	2R	A	1R
