= Petr Kanderal =

Swiss tennis player

- Country (sports): Czechoslovakia; Switzerland
- Born: 16 January 1948 Zürich, Switzerland
- Died: 28 November 1991 (aged 43) Zürich, Switzerland

Singles

Grand Slam singles results
- Australian Open: 1R (1974)
- French Open: 2R (1974)
- Wimbledon: 3R (1974)

Doubles

Grand Slam doubles results
- Australian Open: 3R (1974)

Petr Kanderal (16 January 1948 – 28 November 1991) was a Czechoslovak-born Swiss professional tennis player.

== Biography ==
An exile from Czechoslovakia, he was based out of Zürich.

Kanderal played in the Davis Cup for Switzerland every year from 1973 to 1978, featuring in a total of 11 ties.

His best performance in a grand slam tournament came as a qualifier at the 1974 Wimbledon Championships, where he made it through to the third round, with wins over Marcello Lara and Bob Giltinan.

== See also ==
- List of Switzerland Davis Cup team representatives
