= Patrick Mohr =

Swiss tennis player (born 1971)

- Full name: Patrick Mohr
- Country (sports): Switzerland
- Born: 6 April 1971 (age 54)
- Prize money: $37,258

Singles
- Career record: 0–4
- Career titles: 0
- Highest ranking: No. 263 (28 August 1995)

Doubles
- Career record: 1–2
- Career titles: 0
- Highest ranking: No. 219 (28 August 1995)

Patrick Mohr (born 6 April 1971) is a Swiss former professional tennis player.

== Biography ==
Mohr, the son of Czechoslovak immigrants, turned professional in 1992 and was based in Wetzikon.

At the 1994 French Open he made it to the final round of qualifying, by beating Brian MacPhie and Christian Bergström, before he was eliminated in three sets by Lars-Anders Wahlgren.

Mohr played his first match for the Switzerland Davis Cup team in 1994, a World Group qualifier against Indonesia in Jakarta. The Swiss secured the tie by winning the doubles, so Mohr was given a run in the reverse singles, which he lost to Benny Wijaya. His only other Davis Cup appearance came in the first round of the 1995 World Group, when Switzerland faced the Netherlands at home in Geneva. The Swiss lost Marc Rosset to a broken foot in the opening match and had to call on reserve Lorenzo Manta to replace him in the reverse singles. By beating Manta the Dutch won the tie and Mohr featured in the final rubber, a loss to Jan Siemerink.

On the ATP Tour he appeared in the main draw twice at the Swiss Open Gstaad, for first round losses in each, to Marcelo Ríos in 1995 and Alexandre Strambini in 1996. He also played doubles at both tournaments and made the second round in 1996, with Strambini as his partner.

He was runner-up in three Challenger tournaments during his career.

== See also ==
- List of Switzerland Davis Cup team representatives
