= Penny Moor =

British tennis player (1951–2026)

- Full name: Penelope Moor
- Country (sports): United Kingdom
- Born: 7 July 1951
- Died: 8 October 2026 (aged 75) Devon, England
- Plays: Left-handed

Grand Slam singles results
- French Open: 1R (1974)
- Wimbledon: 3R (1973)
- US Open: 1R (1972)

Grand Slam doubles results
- Wimbledon: 3R (1975)

Grand Slam mixed doubles results
- Wimbledon: 1R (1974)
- US Open: 2R (1972)

Penelope Moor (7 July 1951 – 8 October 2026) was a British professional tennis player.

A left-handed player from Exeter, Moor competed on the professional tour in the 1960s and 1970s. She made the singles third round of the 1973 Wimbledon Championships and had a best world ranking of 98.

In 1980 she moved to North Carolina, where she remained a longtime resident.

Moor died at her home in Devon, England, on 8 October 2026, aged 75.
