= 1974 Wimbledon Championships =

- Date: 24 June – 6 July
- Edition: 88th
- Category: Grand Slam
- Draw: 128S / 64D / 128X
- Prize money: £97,100
- Surface: Grass
- Location: Church Road; SW19, Wimbledon, London, United Kingdom
- Venue: All England Lawn Tennis and Croquet Club

Champions

Men's singles
- (United States) Jimmy Connors

Women's singles
- (United States) Chris Evert

Men's doubles
- (Australia) John Newcombe / (Australia) Tony Roche

Women's doubles
- (Australia) Evonne Goolagong / (United States) Peggy Michel

Mixed doubles
- (Australia) Owen Davidson / (United States) Billie Jean King

Boys' singles
- (United States) Billy Martin

Girls' singles
- (Socialist Federal Republic of Yugoslavia) Mima Jaušovec
← 1973 ·	Wimbledon Championships	· 1975 →

The 1974 Wimbledon Championships was a tennis tournament that took place on the outdoor grass courts at the All England Lawn Tennis and Croquet Club in Wimbledon, London, United Kingdom. The tournament was held from Monday 24 June until Saturday 6 July 1974. It was the 88th staging of the Wimbledon Championships, and the third Grand Slam tennis event of 1974. Jimmy Connors and Chris Evert won the singles titles.

== Prize money ==
The total prize money for 1974 championships was £97,100. The winner of the men's title earned £10,000 while the women's singles champion earned £7,000.

Event	W	F	SF	QF	Round of 16	Round of 32	Round of 64	Round of 128
Men's singles	£10,000	£6,000	£2,000	£1,000	£600	£300	£200	£150
Women's singles	£7,000	£4,000	£1,500	£750	£500	£250	£175	£150
Men's doubles *	£2,000	£1,200	£800	£400	£0	£0	£0	—
Women's doubles *	£1,200	£700	£350	£200	£0	£0	£0	—
Mixed doubles *	£1,000	£500	£300	£150	£0	£0	£0	£0

_{* per team}

== Champions ==
=== Seniors ===
==== Men's singles ====
(United States) Jimmy Connors defeated (Australia) Ken Rosewall, 6–1, 6–1, 6–4

- It was Connors's 2nd career Grand Slam title, and his 1st Wimbledon title.

==== Women's singles ====
(United States) Chris Evert defeated (Soviet Union) Olga Morozova, 6–0, 6–4

- It was Evert's 2nd career Grand Slam title, and her 1st Wimbledon title.

==== Men's doubles ====
(Australia) John Newcombe / (Australia) Tony Roche defeated (United States) Bob Lutz / (United States) Stan Smith, 8–6, 6–4, 6–4

==== Women's doubles ====
(Australia) Evonne Goolagong / (United States) Peggy Michel defeated (Australia) Helen Gourlay / (Australia) Karen Krantzcke, 2–6, 6–4, 6–3

==== Mixed doubles ====
(Australia) Owen Davidson / (United States) Billie Jean King defeated (United Kingdom) Mark Farrell / (United Kingdom) Lesley Charles, 6–3, 9–7

=== Juniors ===
==== Boys' singles ====
(United States) Billy Martin defeated (India) Ashok Amritraj, 6–2, 6–1

==== Girls' singles ====
(Socialist Federal Republic of Yugoslavia) Mima Jaušovec defeated (Romania) Mariana Simionescu, 7–5, 6–4

== Singles seeds ==
=== Men's singles ===
1. (Australia) John Newcombe (quarterfinals, lost to Ken Rosewall)
2. (Romania) Ilie Năstase (fourth round, lost to Dick Stockton)
3. (United States) Jimmy Connors (champion)
4. (United States) Stan Smith (semifinals, lost to Ken Rosewall)
5. (Sweden) Björn Borg (third round, lost to Ismail El Shafei)
6. (Czechoslovakia) Jan Kodeš (quarterfinals, lost to Jimmy Connors)
7. (Netherlands) Tom Okker (fourth round, lost to Alex Metreveli)
8. (United States) Arthur Ashe (third round, lost to Roscoe Tanner)
9. (Australia) Ken Rosewall (final, lost to Jimmy Connors)
10. (Soviet Union) Alex Metreveli (quarterfinals, lost to Dick Stockton)
11. (United States) Tom Gorman (fourth round, lost to Jan Kodeš)
12. (Spain) Manuel Orantes (fourth round, lost to Ismail El Shafei)

=== Women's singles ===
1. (United States) Billie Jean King (quarterfinals, lost to Olga Morozova)
2. (United States) Chris Evert (champion)
3. (Australia) Evonne Goolagong (quarterfinals, lost to Kerry Melville)
4. (United States) Rosie Casals (fourth round, lost to Linky Boshoff)
5. (United Kingdom) Virginia Wade (semifinals, lost to Olga Morozova)
6. (Australia) Kerry Melville (semifinals, lost to Chris Evert)
7. (United States) Nancy Gunter (withdrew before the tournament began)
8. (Soviet Union) Olga Morozova (final, lost to Chris Evert)

Preceded by 1974 French Open	Grand Slams	Succeeded by 1974 US Open
