= 1973 Wimbledon Championships – Men's singles qualifying =

Men's singles qualifying
- 1973 Wimbledon Championships

Events
Singles	men	women		boys	girls
Doubles	men	women	mixed	boys	girls
WC Singles	men	women	quad
WC Doubles	men	women	quad
Legends	men	women	seniors

Qualification
Singles	men	women
Doubles	men	women
- Wimbledon Championships

Players who neither had high enough rankings nor received wild cards to enter the main draw of the annual Wimbledon Tennis Championships participated in a qualifying tournament held one week before the event. Several players withdrew from the main draw after qualifying had commenced, leading to the highest ranked players who lost in the final qualifying round to be entered into the main draw as lucky losers.

The 1973 Wimbledon Championships featured an abnormally large number of qualifiers and lucky losers because 81 of the top Association of Tennis Professionals (ATP) players, including defending champion Stan Smith, boycotted the tournament in protest against the suspension of Nikola Pilić by the Yugoslav Tennis Association, supported by the International Lawn Tennis Federation (ILTF).

== Qualifiers ==
1. (West Germany) Frank Gebert
2. (Australia) Allan McDonald
3. (Mexico) Marcello Lara
4. (Australia) Syd Ball
5. (Austria) Peter Pokorny
6. (Romania) Ionel Santeiu
7. (United States) Eugene Scott
8. (India) Premjit Lall
9. (New Zealand) Anthony Parun
10. (Rhodesia) Colin Dowdeswell
11. (United States) Steve Messmer
12. (Netherlands) Jan Hordijk
13. (France) Jean-Baptiste Chanfreau
14. (United Kingdom) John Clifton
15. (Japan) Toshiro Sakai
16. (France) Jean-Louis Haillet
17. (Australia) Bob Giltinan
18. (United States) Billy Martin
19. (South Africa) John Yuill
20. (Sweden) Tenny Svensson
21. (United Kingdom) Robin Drysdale
22. (Australia) Keith Hancock
23. (Australia) Graeme Thomson
24. (Australia) William Lloyd
25. (West Germany) Hans-Joachim Plötz
26. (Pakistan) Munawar Iqbal
27. (Australia) William Durham
28. (South Africa) Byron Bertram
29. (South Africa) Richard Buwalda
30. (West Germany) Hans Engert
31. (India) Gaurav Misra
32. (Australia) Eugene Russo

== Lucky losers ==
1. (United States) William Brown
2. (United Kingdom) Phil Siviter
3. (United States) Kenneth McMillan
4. (Mexico) Roberto Chávez
5. (United Kingdom) Richard Lewis
6. (United Kingdom) Clay Iles
7. (Czechoslovakia) Vladimír Zedník
8. (Spain) José Moreno
9. (United Kingdom) Mike Collins
10. (United States) Dick R. Bohrnstedt
11. (New Zealand) Jeff Simpson
12. (United States) Chico Hagey
13. (United Kingdom) Colin McHugo
14. (United Kingdom) Stanley Matthews
15. (Hungary) Róbert Machán
16. (Australia) Greg Braun
17. (United States) Pancho Walthall
18. (India) Chiradip Mukerjea
19. (Australia) Cliff Letcher
20. (United States) Robert Stock
21. (United Kingdom) Mark Farrell
22. (United States) Thomas Karp
23. (New Zealand) Russell Simpson
24. (France) Thierry Bernasconi
25. (South Africa) Bernard Mitton
26. (Japan) Kiyoshi Tanabe
27. (Switzerland) Petr Kanderal
28. (United States) Greg Peebles
29. (India) Jasjit Singh
30. (Belgium) Patrick Hombergen
31. (United States) Dan Bleckinger
32. (United States) Doug Crawford
33. (United States) Norman Holmes
34. (Australia) Paul McNamee
35. (Japan) Jun Kuki
36. (Socialist Federal Republic of Yugoslavia) Dragan Stojović
37. (Australia) John James
38. (France) Jean-François Caujolle
39. (Australia) Harold Turnbull
40. (Soviet Union) Konstantin Pugaev
41. (Australia) Ernie Ewert
42. (India) Anand Amritraj
43. (Pakistan) Saeed Meer
44. (India) Jaidip Mukerjea
45. (Ecuador) Eduardo Zuleta
46. (Australia) Greg Perkins
47. (United Kingdom) Peter Curtis
48. (Italy) Pietro Marzano
49. (Japan) Kenichi Hirai

== Qualifying draw ==
Key

- Q = Qualifier
- WC = Wild card
- LL = Lucky loser
- Alt = Alternate
- ITF = ITF entry
- PR = Protected ranking
- SR = Special ranking
- SE = Special exempt
- JE = Junior exempt
- JR = Junior Accelerator Programme entrant
- CO = College Accelerator Programme entrant
- NG = Next Gen Accelerator Program entrant
- w/o = Walkover
- r = Retired
- d = Defaulted

=== First qualifier ===
First round
(West Germany) Frank Gebert	5	6	6
(India) Chiradip Mukerjea	7	3	4
(United States) Sherwood Stewart	2	6	6
(United States) Steve Siegel	6	2	2

Qualifying competition
(West Germany) Frank Gebert	6	6
(United States) Sherwood Stewart	3	1

=== Second qualifier ===
First round
(Australia) Allan McDonald	6	4	6
(Japan) Jun Kuki	3	6	1
(Spain) José Moreno	6	6
(United States) Norman Holmes	4	3

Qualifying competition
(Australia) Allan McDonald	8	6
(Spain) José Moreno	6	4

=== Third qualifier ===
First round
(Mexico) Marcello Lara	6	6
(Jamaica) Richard Russell	2	2
(France) Jean-François Caujolle	8	6	6
(United States) Larry Parker	9	2	1

Qualifying competition
(Mexico) Marcello Lara	6	6
(France) Jean-François Caujolle	4	1

=== Fourth qualifier ===
First round
(Australia) Syd Ball	6	7
(Australia) Ernie Ewert	3	5
(United Kingdom) Peter Curtis	6	6
(Bulgaria) Matei Pampoulov	4	2

Qualifying competition
(Australia) Syd Ball	6	6
(United Kingdom) Peter Curtis	2	1

=== Fifth qualifier ===
First round
(Austria) Peter Pokorny	6	6	6
(South Africa) Deon Joubert	3	8	2
(United Kingdom) Phil Siviter	9	6
(Japan) Kiyoshi Tanabe	8	2

Qualifying competition
(Austria) Peter Pokorny	6	6	6
(United Kingdom) Phil Siviter	8	3	4

=== Sixth qualifier ===
First round
(Romania) Ionel Santeiu	6	7
(Socialist Federal Republic of Yugoslavia) Dragan Stojović	3	5
(United States) Robert Stock	1	6	6
(Australia) Chris Kachel	6	3	2

Qualifying competition
(Romania) Ionel Santeiu	6	6
(United States) Robert Stock	3	3

=== Seventh qualifier ===
First round
(United States) Eugene Scott	6	6
(Pakistan) Saeed Meer	2	4
(Australia) John Bartlett	4	8	6
(United States) Dick R. Bohrnstedt	6	6	4

Qualifying competition
(United States) Eugene Scott	6	6
(Australia) John Bartlett	3	1

=== Eighth qualifier ===
First round
(India) Premjit Lall	6	6
(United Kingdom) Martin Robinson	2	2
(France) Jean-Paul Meyer	2	6	6
(Ecuador) Eduardo Zuleta	6	4	3

Qualifying competition
(India) Premjit Lall	6	3	6
(France) Jean-Paul Meyer	2	6	3

=== Ninth qualifier ===
First round
(New Zealand) Anthony Parun	6	8
(Hungary) Róbert Machán	3	6
(Czechoslovakia) Vladimír Zedník	6	4	16
(Mexico) Roberto Chávez	2	6	14

Qualifying competition
(New Zealand) Anthony Parun	6	6
(Czechoslovakia) Vladimír Zedník	4	4

=== Tenth qualifier ===
First round
(Rhodesia) Colin Dowdeswell	6	6	6
(Australia) Greg Perkins	8	4	3
(Chile) Patricio Cornejo Seckel	3	6	6
(Soviet Union) Konstantin Pugaev	6	3	2

Qualifying competition
(Rhodesia) Colin Dowdeswell	9	8
(Chile) Patricio Cornejo Seckel	7	6

=== Eleventh qualifier ===
First round
(United States) Steve Messmer	6	3	6
(Australia) John James	1	6	4
(Australia) Greg Braun	7	9
(Romania) Sever Muresan	5	8

Qualifying competition
(United States) Steve Messmer	6	7
(Australia) Greg Braun	2	5

=== Twelfth qualifier ===
First round
(Netherlands) Jan Hordijk	6	6
(Bolivia) Eduardo Gorostiaga	2	3
(United States) Dan Bleckinger	6	6
(Australia) Max Cocks	2	2

Qualifying competition
(Netherlands) Jan Hordijk	6	1	8
(United States) Dan Bleckinger	4	6	6

=== Thirteenth qualifier ===
First round
(France) Jean-Baptiste Chanfreau	8	6
(United States) Kenneth McMillan	6	4
(United Kingdom) Richard Lewis	6	3	6
(New Zealand) Jeff Simpson	4	6	4

Qualifying competition
(France) Jean-Baptiste Chanfreau	1	8	7
(United Kingdom) Richard Lewis	6	6	5

=== Fourteenth qualifier ===
First round
(United Kingdom) John Clifton	6	6
(United Kingdom) Ashley Compton-Dando	2	4
(United States) Pancho Walthall	3	6	6
(Australia) John Eastburn	6	3	4

Qualifying competition
(United Kingdom) John Clifton	9	6
(United States) Pancho Walthall	8	3

=== Fifteenth qualifier ===
First round
(Japan) Toshiro Sakai	6	7
(United States) Roy Barth	4	5
(Australia) Paul Kronk	6	6
(Italy) Piero Toci	3	2

Qualifying competition
(Japan) Toshiro Sakai	6	6
(Australia) Paul Kronk	4	3

=== Sixteenth qualifier ===
First round
(France) Jean-Louis Haillet	6	6
(Greece) Nicolas Kelaidis	3	3
(Australia) Paul McNamee	3	9
(United States) Tom Leonard	6	8^{r}

Qualifying competition
(France) Jean-Louis Haillet	6	6	6
(Australia) Paul McNamee	8	4	3

=== Seventeenth qualifier ===
First round
(Australia) Bob Giltinan	6	0	6
(India) Jasjit Singh	4	6	1
(Italy) Pietro Marzano	9	4	6
(Japan) Kenichi Hirai	8	6	3

Qualifying competition
(Australia) Bob Giltinan	6	6
(Italy) Pietro Marzano	4	4

=== Eighteenth qualifier ===
First round
(United States) Billy Martin	6	6
(Bulgaria) Ljuben Genov	2	1
(United Kingdom) Colin McHugo	7	1	6
(Socialist Federal Republic of Yugoslavia) Igor Košak	5	6	3

Qualifying competition
(United States) Billy Martin	6	6
(United Kingdom) Colin McHugo	3	1

=== Nineteenth qualifier ===
First round
(South Africa) John Yuill	6	8	6
(France) Thierry Bernasconi	4	9	3
(New Zealand) Russell Simpson	6	3	6
(United States) John Fort	4	6	0

Qualifying competition
(South Africa) John Yuill	6	6
(New Zealand) Russell Simpson	4	4

=== Twentieth qualifier ===
First round
(Sweden) Tenny Svensson	7	6
(South Africa) Terry Ryan	5	4
(United Kingdom) Clay Iles	7	6
(United States) Armistead Neely	5	4

Qualifying competition
(Sweden) Tenny Svensson	6	6
(United Kingdom) Clay Iles	3	4

=== Twenty-first qualifier ===
First round
(United Kingdom) Robin Drysdale	6	6
(United States) Tim Noonan	3	4
(Australia) Cliff Letcher	9	6
(Bulgaria) Bozhidar Pampoulov	7	4

Qualifying competition
(United Kingdom) Robin Drysdale	6	6
(Australia) Cliff Letcher	4	0

=== Twenty-second qualifier ===
First round
(Australia) Keith Hancock	6	6
(Canada) Donald McCormick	3	0
(United Kingdom) Mark Farrell	6	6
(Sweden) Rolf Norberg	0	4

Qualifying competition
(Australia) Keith Hancock	9	6
(United Kingdom) Mark Farrell	8	3

=== Twenty-third qualifier ===
First round
(Australia) Graeme Thomson	6	7
(Netherlands) Fred Hemmes	0	5
(United States) Thomas Karp	6	4	6
(Czechoslovakia) Jan Kukal	4	6	4

Qualifying competition
(Australia) Graeme Thomson	8	7
(United States) Thomas Karp	6	5

=== Twenty-fourth qualifier ===
First round
(Australia) William Lloyd	6	6
(Spain) Juan Ignacio Muntañola	4	3
(India) Jaidip Mukerjea	6	6
(Japan) K. Shimamura	3	0

Qualifying competition
(Australia) William Lloyd	6	6
(India) Jaidip Mukerjea	4	2

=== Twenty-fifth qualifier ===
First round
(West Germany) Hans-Joachim Plötz	5	9	6
(Poland) Jacek Niedźwiedzki	7	7	4
(Australia) Harold Turnbull	6	6
(South Korea) Kim Sung-bae	4	4

Qualifying competition
(West Germany) Hans-Joachim Plötz	3	6	6
(Australia) Harold Turnbull	6	4	0

=== Twenty-sixth qualifier ===
First round
(Pakistan) Munawar Iqbal	6	6
(United Kingdom) Mike Collins	4	3
(United States) Dick Dell	6	6
(France) Jacques Thamin	3	1

Qualifying competition
(Pakistan) Munawar Iqbal	8	6
(United States) Dick Dell	6	1

=== Twenty-seventh qualifier ===
First round
(Australia) William Durham	6	8
(Argentina) Lito Álvarez	3	6
(United States) Chico Hagey	6	7
(United Kingdom) Jonathan Smith	4	5

Qualifying competition
(Australia) William Durham	7	6
(United States) Chico Hagey	5	3

=== Twenty-eighth qualifier ===
First round
(South Africa) Byron Bertram	7	6
(Netherlands) Rolf Thung	5	2
(Switzerland) Petr Kanderal	6	6
(Italy) Ezio Di Matteo	3	1

Qualifying competition
(South Africa) Byron Bertram	6	8
(Switzerland) Petr Kanderal	3	6

=== Twenty-ninth qualifier ===
First round
(South Africa) Richard Buwalda	6	3	7
(France) Pierre Joly	4	6	5
(Argentina) Tito Vázquez	6	9
(United Kingdom) Stanley Matthews	1	8

Qualifying competition
(South Africa) Richard Buwalda	7	8	6
(Argentina) Tito Vázquez	5	9	4

=== Thirtieth qualifier ===
First round
(West Germany) Hans Engert	8	6
(United States) William Brown	6	3
(Argentina) Julián Ganzábal	6	8	6
(Italy) Vincenzo Franchitti	8	6	4

Qualifying competition
(West Germany) Hans Engert	8	3	6
(Argentina) Julián Ganzábal	6	6	3

=== Thirty-first qualifier ===
First round
(India) Gaurav Misra	9	6
(South Africa) Bernard Mitton	8	4
(United States) Greg Peebles	6	9
(Mexico) Emilio Montaño	3	8

Qualifying competition
(India) Gaurav Misra	5	6	9
(United States) Greg Peebles	7	4	7

=== Thirty-second qualifier ===
First round
(Australia) Eugene Russo	6	6
(Canada) Guy Tytherleigh	1	1
(United States) Doug Crawford	6	6
(Mexico) Luis Baraldi	2	4

Qualifying competition
(Australia) Eugene Russo	9	3	6
(United States) Doug Crawford	8	6	4
