= 1972 French Open – Men's singles qualifying =

Men's singles qualifying
- 1972 French Open

Events
Singles	men	women		boys	girls
Doubles	men	women	mixed	boys	girls
WC Singles	men	women	quad
WC Doubles	men	women	quad
Legends	−45	45+	women

Qualification
Singles	men	women
- French Open

Players who neither had high enough rankings nor received wild cards to enter the main draw of the annual French Open Tennis Championships participated in a qualifying tournament held in the week before the event.

== Qualifiers ==
1. (Chile) Patricio Rodríguez
2. (France) Patrice Beust
3. (Hungary) Géza Varga
4. (Argentina) Ricardo Cano
5. (Soviet Union) Teimuraz Kakulia
6. (France) Bernard Montrenaud
7. (Italy) Piero Toci
8. (France) François Pierson
9. (United States) Sherwood Stewart
10. (United States) Steve Faulk
11. (United Kingdom) John De Mendoza
12. (Socialist Federal Republic of Yugoslavia) Zlatko Ivančić
13. (South Africa) Rayno Seegers
14. (United States) Steven Turner
15. (Australia) Bob Rheinberger
16. (Australia) Allan McDonald

== Lucky losers ==
1. (Italy) Massimo Di Domenico

== Qualifying draw ==
Key

- Q = Qualifier
- WC = Wild card
- LL = Lucky loser
- Alt = Alternate
- ITF = ITF entry
- PR = Protected ranking
- SR = Special ranking
- SE = Special exempt
- JE = Junior exempt
- JR = Junior Accelerator Programme entrant
- CO = College Accelerator Programme entrant
- NG = Next Gen Accelerator Program entrant
- w/o = Walkover
- r = Retired
- d = Defaulted

=== First qualifier ===
First round
1	(Chile) Patricio Rodríguez	7	6
8	(France) Guy Rual	5	3
4	(France) Pierre Joly	10	6
5	(Australia) Jim Moore	8	3
2	(South Africa) Dennis Matthews	3	6	9
7	(Italy) Pietro Marzano	6	2	7

Second round
(Chile) Patricio Rodríguez	6	6
(France) Pierre Joly	3	1
(South Africa) Dennis Matthews	6	8
(Australia) Keith Hancock	2	6

Qualifying competition
(Chile) Patricio Rodríguez	6	6	6
(South Africa) Dennis Matthews	0	3	3

=== Second qualifier ===
First round
1	(New Zealand) Don Turner	9	8
8	(Switzerland) Michel Burgener	7	6
2	(France) Patrice Beust	6	6
7	(Switzerland) Rolf Spitzer	4	2
3	(United States) Richard Moody	6	3	6
6	(France) Fabrice Paquet	1	6	2

Second round
(New Zealand) Don Turner	3	1
(United States) Dan Bleckinger	6	6
(France) Patrice Beust	6	6
(United States) Richard Moody	2	0

Qualifying competition
(United States) Dan Bleckinger	4	5	3
(France) Patrice Beust	6	7	6

=== Third qualifier ===
First round
1	(United States) Paul Gerken	6	6
8	(France) François Battegay	3	0
4	(Romania) Sever Dron	2	6	6
5	(France) Bruno Sapène	6	0	3
2	(France) Thierry Bernasconi	6	6
7	(Japan) Kenichi Hirai	1	3

Second round
(United States) Paul Gerken	2	2
(Romania) Sever Dron	6	6
(France) Thierry Bernasconi	0	2
(Hungary) Géza Varga	6	6

Qualifying competition
(Romania) Sever Dron	6	1	2	1
(Hungary) Géza Varga	3	6	6	6

=== Fourth qualifier ===
First round
1	(France) Denis Naegelen	6	6
8	(United States) J Maharaj	2	2
2	(France) Armel Collinot	6	6
7	(United States) J Hester	2	3
3	(New Zealand) Russell Simpson	6	6
6	(United States) Jim Ward	2	2

Second round
(France) Denis Naegelen	2	1
(Argentina) Ricardo Cano	6	6
(France) Armel Collinot	5	0
(New Zealand) Russell Simpson	7	6

Qualifying competition
(Argentina) Ricardo Cano	11	2	7	6
(New Zealand) Russell Simpson	9	6	5	4

=== Fifth qualifier ===
First round
1	(United States) Dick Dell	6	6
8	(Australia) William Durham	1	4
4	(United States) Robert Stock	6	6
5	(France) Jean Lovera	2	3
2	(Soviet Union) Teimuraz Kakulia	6	6
7	(France) Éric Derasse	2	1
3	(Brazil) Luis-Felipe Tavares	6	6
6	(France) Alain Benoît-Levy	3	2

Second round
(United States) Dick Dell	6	6
(United States) Robert Stock	1	3
(Soviet Union) Teimuraz Kakulia	3	6	6
(Brazil) Luis-Felipe Tavares	6	1	1

Qualifying competition
(United States) Dick Dell	7	9	2	4
(Soviet Union) Teimuraz Kakulia	5	11	6	6

=== Sixth qualifier ===
First round
2	(West Germany) Karl Fichtel	9	10
7	(United States) Lenny Schloss	7	8

Second round
(France) Pierre Loizeau	6	4	6
(France) Claude Boutard	4	6	4
(West Germany) Karl Fichtel	3	5
(France) Bernard Montrenaud	6	7

Qualifying competition
(France) Pierre Loizeau	3	0	2
(France) Bernard Montrenaud	6	6	6

=== Seventh qualifier ===
First round
1	(Italy) Piero Toci	6	6
8	(Indonesia) Samudra Sangitan	2	4
2	(United States) Mike Estep	10	6
7	(Ecuador) Eduardo Zuleta	8	3

Second round
(Italy) Piero Toci	6	8
(France) Éric Deblicker	1	6
(United States) Mike Estep	6	3	0
(Romania) Sever Muresan	4	6	6

Qualifying competition
(Italy) Piero Toci	6	6	6
(Romania) Sever Muresan	1	4	2

=== Eighth qualifier ===
First round
1	(United Kingdom) John Lloyd	6	11
8	(France) Jean-Charles Toesca	1	9
2	(France) François Pierson	6	6
7	(United States) Steve Siegel	4	2

Second round
(United Kingdom) John Lloyd	8	6
(France) Marc Ungerer	6	3
(France) François Pierson	9	6
(France) Maurice Claitte	7	2

Qualifying competition
(United Kingdom) John Lloyd	6	4	9	10	4
(France) François Pierson	0	6	11	8	6

=== Ninth qualifier ===
First round
1	(France) Éric Loliée	6	6
8	(Italy) Luciano Bonati	1	0
2	(Spain) Luis Bruguera	3	6	8
7	(France) Patrice Hagelauer	6	4	6

Second round
(France) Éric Loliée	6	3	6
(France) Denis Grozdanovitch	3	6	8
(Spain) Luis Bruguera	3	5
(United States) Sherwood Stewart	6	7

Qualifying competition
(France) Denis Grozdanovitch	2	3	3
(United States) Sherwood Stewart	6	6	6

=== Tenth qualifier ===
First round
1	(Italy) Sergio Palmieri	8	6
8	(France) Jacques Laurent	6	0
4	(United States) Steve Faulk	6	6
5	(France) Jean-Roger Cadot	4	4
2	(Australia) Alan Haswell	6	3	6
7	(Belgium) Michel De Marneffe	2	6	1

Second round
(Italy) Sergio Palmieri	5	4
(United States) Steve Faulk	7	6
(Australia) Alan Haswell	6	6
(France) Bernard Paul	3	4

Qualifying competition
(United States) Steve Faulk	9	7	6	7
(Australia) Alan Haswell	7	9	3	5

=== Eleventh qualifier ===
First round
1	(United Kingdom) John De Mendoza	6	6
8	(Israel) Yair Wertheimer	2	0
4	(Italy) Franco Bartoni	6	4	6
5	(France) Philippe Couson	3	6	1

Second round
(United Kingdom) John De Mendoza	6	6
(Italy) Franco Bartoni	3	4
(France) François Matheu
(France) Jean-Pierre Bombardier	w/o

Qualifying competition
(United Kingdom) John De Mendoza	6	6	4	9
(France) François Matheu	2	0	6	7

=== Twelfth qualifier ===
First round
1	(Socialist Federal Republic of Yugoslavia) Zlatko Ivančić	6	5	8
8	(France) Michel Bergès	3	7	6
4	(France) Jean-Pierre Courcol	4	6	6
5	(United States) Mark Shires	6	0	3
2	(Brazil) Eulicio Silva	6	6
7	(France) Jean-Claude Fauvet	2	3

Second round
(Socialist Federal Republic of Yugoslavia) Zlatko Ivančić	6	6
(France) Jean-Pierre Courcol	2	4
(Brazil) Eulicio Silva	6	4
(Romania) Ionel Santeiu	8	6

Qualifying competition
(Socialist Federal Republic of Yugoslavia) Zlatko Ivančić	6	6	6
(Romania) Ionel Santeiu	3	1	3

=== Thirteenth qualifier ===
First round
2	(Australia) Ernie Ewert	6	6
7	(Belgium) Pieter Verstraeten	2	3

Second round
(South Africa) Rayno Seegers	6	6
(Argentina) Lito Álvarez	0	4
(Australia) Ernie Ewert	3	3
(Jamaica) Richard Russell	6	6

Qualifying competition
(South Africa) Rayno Seegers	6	6	6
(Jamaica) Richard Russell	1	1	1

=== Fourteenth qualifier ===
First round
2	(United States) J Glaves	1	6	6
7	(Switzerland) Erik Sturdza	6	3	3

Second round
(United States) Steven Turner	8	6
(France) Yves Hugon	6	1
(United States) J Glaves	3	2
(France) Jean-Pierre Olivier	6	6

Qualifying competition
(United States) Steven Turner	6	6	6
(France) Jean-Pierre Olivier	4	0	2

=== Fifteenth qualifier ===
First round
2	(Australia) Bob Rheinberger	6	3	6
7	(France) Patrick Béraud	4	6	3
3	(France) Alain Bouteleux	6	8	6
6	(Australia) Tony Dawson	4	10	4

Second round
(Italy) Massimo Di Domenico	0	6	6
(France) Jean-François Caujolle	6	2	4
(Australia) Bob Rheinberger	6	6
(France) Alain Bouteleux	3	1

Qualifying competition
(Italy) Massimo Di Domenico	4	4	4
(Australia) Bob Rheinberger	6	6	6

=== Sixteenth qualifier ===
First round
1	(France) Bernard Detroye	6	6
8	(United States) Gene Malin	3	4
4	(Australia) Allan McDonald	6	6
5	(United States) Stanley Pasarell	3	2
2	(South Africa) William Freer	6	8
7	(Italy) Vittorio Crotta	0	6
3	(Switzerland) Dimitri Sturdza	4	6	6
6	(Australia) William Mason	6	4	2

Second round
(France) Bernard Detroye	4	6	3
(Australia) Allan McDonald	6	2	6
(South Africa) William Freer	4	6	6
(Switzerland) Dimitri Sturdza	6	3	3

Qualifying competition
(Australia) Allan McDonald	7	6	6
(South Africa) William Freer	5	2	4
