= 1973 French Open – Men's singles qualifying =

Men's singles qualifying
- 1973 French Open

Events
Singles	men	women		boys	girls
Doubles	men	women	mixed	boys	girls
WC Singles	men	women	quad
WC Doubles	men	women	quad
Legends	−45	45+	women

Qualification
Singles	men	women
- French Open

Players who neither had high enough rankings nor received wild cards to enter the main draw of the annual French Open Tennis Championships participated in a qualifying tournament held in the week before the event.

== Qualifiers ==
1. (Australia) William Lloyd
2. (Soviet Union) Sergei Likhachev
3. (Mexico) Roberto Chávez
4. (Argentina) Tito Vázquez
5. (Italy) Piero Toci
6. (Japan) Jun Kuki
7. (France) Pierre Joly
8. (Australia) Kim Warwick
9. (France) Éric Deblicker
10. (Hungary) Géza Varga
11. (France) Denis Naegelen
12. (United Kingdom) John Lloyd
13. (Mexico) Emilio Montaño
14. (Romania) Toma Ovici
15. (United States) Steve Siegel
16. (Australia) Paul Kronk

== Lucky losers ==
1. (West Germany) Attila Korpás
2. (United States) Sherwood Stewart
3. (France) Jean-Louis Haillet

== Qualifying draw ==
Key

- Q = Qualifier
- WC = Wild card
- LL = Lucky loser
- Alt = Alternate
- ITF = ITF entry
- PR = Protected ranking
- SR = Special ranking
- SE = Special exempt
- JE = Junior exempt
- JR = Junior Accelerator Programme entrant
- CO = College Accelerator Programme entrant
- NG = Next Gen Accelerator Program entrant
- w/o = Walkover
- r = Retired
- d = Defaulted

=== First qualifier ===
First round
(Australia) William Lloyd
(France) Éric Derasse	w/o
(United States) Tim Noonan	7	6
(United States) Larry Hilbert	6	2

Qualifying competition
(Australia) William Lloyd	4	6	6
(United States) Tim Noonan	6	4	0

=== Second qualifier ===
First round
(Soviet Union) Sergei Likhachev	6	6
(Socialist Federal Republic of Yugoslavia) Dragan Stojović	3	0
(France) Jacques Thamin	3	6	6
(Sweden) Jan Zabrodsky	6	4	2

Qualifying competition
(Soviet Union) Sergei Likhachev	6	6
(France) Jacques Thamin	2	2

=== Third qualifier ===
First round
(Mexico) Roberto Chávez	6	6
(United States) J. Lacey	1	2
(Romania) Ionel Santeiu	6	3	6
(Chile) Patricio Rodríguez	3	6	3

Qualifying competition
(Mexico) Roberto Chávez	7	6
(Romania) Ionel Santeiu	5	4

=== Fourth qualifier ===
First round
(Argentina) Tito Vázquez	7	6
(Australia) Keith Hancock	6	1
(Canada) Guy Tytherleigh
(France) Armel Collinot	w/o

Qualifying competition
(Argentina) Tito Vázquez	6	6
(Canada) Guy Tytherleigh	2	0

=== Fifth qualifier ===
First round
(Italy) Piero Toci	6	6
(Australia) Harold Turnbull	2	4
(France) Jean Lovera	6	2	5
(United States) Sherwood Stewart	4	6	7

Qualifying competition
(Italy) Piero Toci	6	7
(United States) Sherwood Stewart	1	5

=== Sixth qualifier ===
First round
(West Germany) Attila Korpás	6	6
(Italy) Vincenzo Franchitti	3	3
(France) Patrice Beust	6	1	6
(Japan) Jun Kuki	4	6	8

Qualifying competition
(West Germany) Attila Korpás	4	6	4
(Japan) Jun Kuki	6	3	6

=== Seventh qualifier ===
First round
(Italy) Pietro Marzano	6	6	2
(West Germany) Ulrich Pinner	7	4	6
(Italy) Sergio Palmieri	6	3	4
(France) Pierre Joly	4	6	6

Qualifying competition
(West Germany) Ulrich Pinner	3	7	4
(France) Pierre Joly	6	6	6

=== Eighth qualifier ===
First round
(Australia) Kim Warwick	6	7
(South Korea) Kim Sung-bae	1	6
(France) Bernard Montrenaud	5	2
(West Germany) Herbert Loerke	7	6

Qualifying competition
(Australia) Kim Warwick	6	6
(West Germany) Herbert Loerke	1	2

=== Ninth qualifier ===
First round
(South Africa) Byron Bertram	2	0
(France) Éric Deblicker	6	6
(Jamaica) Richard Russell	6	4	6
(United States) Butch Seewagen	2	6	3

Qualifying competition
(France) Éric Deblicker	7	7
(Jamaica) Richard Russell	5	5

=== Tenth qualifier ===
First round
(France) Jean-Louis Haillet	6	7
(France) Claude Boutard	3	6
(France) Jean Mazzella	4	3
(Hungary) Géza Varga	6	6

Qualifying competition
(France) Jean-Louis Haillet	4	0
(Hungary) Géza Varga	6	6

=== Eleventh qualifier ===
First round
(France) Jean-François Caujolle	1	6
(France) Denis Naegelen	6	7
(Greece) Nicolas Kelaidis	6	1	6
(Italy) Giordano Maioli	3	6	2

Qualifying competition
(France) Denis Naegelen	6	3	4
(Greece) Nicolas Kelaidis	2	6	4^{r}

=== Twelfth qualifier ===
First round
(Argentina) Lito Álvarez	7	6
(Japan) Kenichi Hirai	6	4
(United Kingdom) John Lloyd	6	6
(Socialist Federal Republic of Yugoslavia) Nikša Suka	1	0

Qualifying competition
(Argentina) Lito Álvarez	2	5
(United Kingdom) John Lloyd	6	7

=== Thirteenth qualifier ===
First round
(Mexico) Emilio Montaño	6	6
(Australia) Paul McNamee	4	4
(Bolivia) Eduardo Gorostiaga	6	6
(Canada) Richard Legendre	0	3

Qualifying competition
(Mexico) Emilio Montaño	7	6
(Bolivia) Eduardo Gorostiaga	5	4

=== Fourteenth qualifier ===
First round
(Romania) Toma Ovici	6	4	6
(Romania) Viorel Marcu	0	6	2
(United States) Kv Lynn	6	6
(West Germany) Hans Egert	2	0

Qualifying competition
(Romania) Toma Ovici	6	6
(United States) Kv Lynn	4	2

=== Fifteenth qualifier ===
First round
(United States) Steve Siegel
(France) Jean-Roger Cadot	w/o
(France) Jean Bergmann	6	1	6
(Romania) Dumitru Hărădău	3	6	2

Qualifying competition
(United States) Steve Siegel	6	6
(France) Jean Bergmann	3	4

=== Sixteenth qualifier ===
First round
(Australia) Paul Kronk	4	6	6
(Belgium) Michel De Marneffe	6	4	1
(Portugal) Sergio Cruz
(France) Patrice Hagelauer	w/o

Qualifying competition
(Australia) Paul Kronk	6	7
(Portugal) Sergio Cruz	3	6
