= 1973 Wimbledon Championships – Mixed doubles =

Mixed doubles
- 1973 Wimbledon Championships

Final
- Champions: (Australia) Owen Davidson (United States) Billie Jean King
- Runners-up: (Mexico) Raúl Ramírez (United States) Janet Newberry
- Score: 6–3, 6–2

Details
- Draw: 80
- Seeds: 4

Events
Singles	men	women		boys	girls
Doubles	men	women	mixed	boys	girls
← 1972 ·	Wimbledon Championships	· 1974 →

Ilie Năstase and Rosie Casals were the defending champions, but lost in the semifinals to Raúl Ramírez and Janet Newberry. Rain delays to the tournament necessitated matches from the fourth round, quarterfinals, semifinals and the final itself being completed on the last two days of the tournament. Davidson and King played three matches on the final day of the tournament to earn their victory, giving King the triple crown. No other player has won the triple crown at Wimbledon in the open era.

Owen Davidson and Billie Jean King defeated Ramírez and Newberry in the final, 6–3, 6–2 to win the mixed doubles tennis title at the 1973 Wimbledon Championships.

== Seeds ==
1. (Romania) Ilie Năstase / (United States) Rosie Casals (quarterfinals, withdrew)
2. (Australia) Owen Davidson / (United States) Billie Jean King (champions)
3. (Soviet Union) Alex Metreveli / (Soviet Union) Olga Morozova (semifinals)
4. (United States) Jimmy Connors / (United States) Chris Evert (quarterfinals)

Click on the seed number of a player to go to their draw section.

== Draw ==
=== Key ===
- Q = Qualifier
- WC = Wild card
- LL = Lucky loser
- Alt = Alternate
- ITF = ITF entry
- PR = Protected ranking
- SR = Special ranking
- SE = Special exempt
- JE = Junior exempt
- JR = Junior Accelerator Programme entrant
- CO = College Accelerator Programme entrant
- NG = Next Gen Accelerator Program entrant
- w/o = Walkover
- r = Retired
- d = Defaulted

=== Finals ===
Quarterfinals
1	(Romania) Ilie Năstase (United States) Rosie Casals
(Mexico) Raúl Ramírez (United States) Janet Newberry	w/o
4	(United States) Jimmy Connors (United States) Chris Evert	6	6	4
(Australia) John Cooper (Australia) Karen Krantzcke	8	4	6
(South Africa) Bernard Mitton (South Africa) Ilana Kloss	3	6	3
3	(Soviet Union) Alex Metreveli (Soviet Union) Olga Morozova	6	4	6
(Czechoslovakia) Jan Kodeš (Czechoslovakia) Martina Navrátilová	3	0
2	(Australia) Owen Davidson (United States) Billie Jean King	6	6

Semifinals
(Mexico) Raúl Ramírez (United States) Janet Newberry	6	6
(Australia) John Cooper (Australia) Karen Krantzcke	1	4
3	(Soviet Union) Alex Metreveli (Soviet Union) Olga Morozova	7	5	1
2	(Australia) Owen Davidson (United States) Billie Jean King	5	7	6

Final
(Mexico) Raúl Ramírez (United States) Janet Newberry	3	2
2	(Australia) Owen Davidson (United States) Billie Jean King	6	6

=== Top half ===
==== Section 1 ====
First round

Second round
1	(Romania) I Năstase (United States) R Casals	8	6
(Sweden) B Borg (Sweden) H Anliot	6	2
(United Kingdom) R Lewis (United Kingdom) G Coles	5	7	6
(Australia) H Turnbull (Australia) W Turnbull	7	5	4
(Rhodesia) C Dowdeswell (South Africa) D Boshoff	6	9
(United States) S Messmer (United States) P Bostrom	4	7
(New Zealand) A Parun (Sweden) C Sandberg	5	6	6
(Italy) A Zugarelli (Italy) L Bassi	7	3	3

Third round
1	(Romania) I Năstase (United States) R Casals	6	6
(United Kingdom) R Lewis (United Kingdom) G Coles	2	3
(Rhodesia) C Dowdeswell (South Africa) D Boshoff	6	6
(New Zealand) A Parun (Sweden) C Sandberg	0	3

Fourth round
1	(Romania) I Năstase (United States) R Casals	6	6
(Rhodesia) C Dowdeswell (South Africa) D Boshoff	4	1

==== Section 2 ====
First round

Second round
(United Kingdom) P Hutchins (United Kingdom) J Williams	4	6	6
(Australia) A McDonald (Australia) J Young	6	0	4
(France) J-C Barclay (France) F Dürr	7	6
(United States) E Scott (United States) K Kemmer	5	4
(Chile) P Rodríguez (Chile) M Rodríguez	6	6
(Argentina) E Álvarez (Argentina) I Roget	2	3
(Mexico) R Ramírez (United States) J Newberry	7	6
(United States) W Brown (United States) L Tenney	5	1

Third round
(United Kingdom) P Hutchins (United Kingdom) J Williams	1	3
(France) J-C Barclay (France) F Dürr	6	6
(Chile) P Rodríguez (Chile) M Rodríguez	5	4
(Mexico) R Ramírez (United States) J Newberry	7	6

Fourth round
(France) J-C Barclay (France) F Dürr	2	6	2
(Mexico) R Ramírez (United States) J Newberry	6	4	6

==== Section 3 ====
First round

Second round
4	(United States) J Connors (United States) C Evert	6	6
(Colombia) I Molina (Uruguay) F Bonicelli	2	1
(France) T Bernasconi (New Zealand) M Pryde	3	6	3
(United States) M Elliott (United States) G Elliott	6	3	6
(Netherlands) R Thung (Netherlands) G Walhof	6	6
(Canada) D McCormick (Canada) J Tindle	3	2
(India) A Amritraj (Australia) M Tesch	5	6	9
(Netherlands) J Hordijk (Netherlands) E Appel	7	4	7

Third round
4	(United States) J Connors (United States) C Evert	3	2
(United States) M Elliott (United States) G Elliott	6	6
(Netherlands) R Thung (Netherlands) G Walhof	3	3
(India) A Amritraj (Australia) M Tesch	6	6

Fourth round
4	(United States) J Connors (United States) C Evert	6	0	6
(India) A Amritraj (Australia) M Tesch	4	6	2

==== Section 4 ====
First round
(France) P Joly (France) F Guédy	3	6	10
(United Kingdom) A Mills (United Kingdom) J Mills	6	4	8
(Australia) N Fraser (United States) W Overton	6	6
(Japan) J Kuki (Japan) N Sato	3	2
(Spain) J Castañón (Chile) C Ibarra	0	2
(Mexico) M Lara (France) R Darmon	6	6
(Chile) J Pinto Bravo (Chile) AM Pinto Bravo	3	6	3
(India) V Amritraj (United Kingdom) L Beaven	6	4	6
(United States) G Mulloy (United States) B Smith	1	4
(United States) J Fort (United States) M Michel	6	6
(Australia) J James (Australia) M Morgan	0	3
(Australia) F Sedgman (United Kingdom) V Wade	6	6
(United States) N Holmes (Australia) V Caulley	6	6
(Italy) P Toci (Italy) R Vido	2	4
(Australia) P McNamee (United Kingdom) C Panton	2	5
(Australia) J Cooper (Australia) K Krantzcke	6	7

Second round
(France) P Joly (France) F Guédy	2	4
(Australia) N Fraser (United States) W Overton	6	6
(Mexico) M Lara (France) R Darmon	6	6
(India) V Amritraj (United Kingdom) L Beaven	4	1
(United States) J Fort (United States) M Michel	4	2
(Australia) F Sedgman (United Kingdom) V Wade	6	6
(United States) N Holmes (Australia) V Caulley	1	1
(Australia) J Cooper (Australia) K Krantzcke	6	6

Third round
(Australia) N Fraser (United States) W Overton	3	6	6
(Mexico) M Lara (France) R Darmon	6	3	1
(Australia) F Sedgman (United Kingdom) V Wade	8	6	4
(Australia) J Cooper (Australia) K Krantzcke	9	2	6

Fourth round
(Australia) N Fraser (United States) W Overton	5	2
(Australia) J Cooper (Australia) K Krantzcke	7	6

=== Bottom half ===
==== Section 5 ====
First round
(United Kingdom) M Farrell (United Kingdom) L Charles	6	6
(Australia) A Rae (Republic of Ireland) S Minford	1	3
(Australia) E Ewert (Australia) K Harris	3	7	2
(South Africa) B Mitton (South Africa) I Kloss	6	5	6
(Soviet Union) S Likhachev (Romania) M Simionescu
(Poland) T Nowicki (Italy) M Giorgi	w/o
(United Kingdom) J Feaver (United Kingdom) V Burton	6	7
(United Kingdom) J Lloyd (United Kingdom) L Blachford	3	5
(United Kingdom) H Truman (United Kingdom) C Janes	7	0
(United Kingdom) R Wilson (United Kingdom) S Brasher	9	6
(Switzerland) P Kanderal (Argentina) R Giscafré
(Hungary) S Baranyi (Hungary) E Ambrus	w/o
(United States) M Machette (United States) S Walsh	6	7
(South Korea) M-i Kim (South Korea) J-s Yang	0	5
(Pakistan) M Iqbal (United Kingdom) J Fayter	3	2
(Australia) G Perkins (Australia) P Coleman	6	6

Second round
(United Kingdom) M Farrell (United Kingdom) L Charles	8	2
(South Africa) B Mitton (South Africa) I Kloss	9	6
(Poland) T Nowicki (Italy) M Giorgi	4	6	5
(United Kingdom) J Feaver (United Kingdom) V Burton	6	3	7
(United Kingdom) R Wilson (United Kingdom) S Brasher	w/o
(Hungary) S Baranyi (Hungary) E Ambrus
(United States) M Machette (United States) S Walsh	7	6
(Australia) G Perkins (Australia) P Coleman	5	3

Third round
(South Africa) B Mitton (South Africa) I Kloss	6	6
(United Kingdom) J Feaver (United Kingdom) V Burton	2	2
(United Kingdom) R Wilson (United Kingdom) S Brasher	6	3	4
(United States) M Machette (United States) S Walsh	2	6	6

Fourth round
(South Africa) B Mitton (South Africa) I Kloss	6	6
(United States) M Machette (United States) S Walsh	4	4

==== Section 6 ====
First round

Second round
(South Africa) R Buwalda (South Africa) P Pretorius	6	6
(South Korea) S-b Kim (South Korea) D-h Lee	0	3
(Czechoslovakia) J Kukal (Czechoslovakia) R Tomanová	4	1
(United Kingdom) K Wooldridge (United Kingdom) W Wooldridge	6	6
(Colombia) J Velasco (Colombia) I Fernández de Soto	6	7
(Australia) S Myers (Australia) P Whytcross	4	5
(New Zealand) J Simpson (New Zealand) J Connor	1	3
3	(Soviet Union) A Metreveli (Soviet Union) O Morozova	6	6

Third round
(South Africa) R Buwalda (South Africa) P Pretorius	4	3
(United Kingdom) K Wooldridge (United Kingdom) W Wooldridge	6	6
(Colombia) J Velasco (Colombia) I Fernández de Soto
3	(Soviet Union) A Metreveli (Soviet Union) O Morozova	w/o

Fourth round
(United Kingdom) K Wooldridge (United Kingdom) W Wooldridge	6	4	3
3	(Soviet Union) A Metreveli (Soviet Union) O Morozova	3	6	6

==== Section 7 ====
First round

Second round
(West Germany) J Fassbender (Netherlands) B Stöve	6	6
(Pakistan) S Meer (United Kingdom) C Molesworth	2	3
(Italy) P Marzano (South Africa) L Rossouw	2	5
(Czechoslovakia) J Kodeš (Czechoslovakia) M Navrátilová	6	7
(Austria) P Pokorny (Austria) S Pachta	7	6
(United Kingdom) J Clifton (United Kingdom) S Mappin	5	3
(Italy) E di Matteo (Italy) D Marzano	2	1
(New Zealand) J McDonald (United States) P Hogan	6	6

Third round
(West Germany) J Fassbender (Netherlands) B Stöve	4	4
(Czechoslovakia) J Kodeš (Czechoslovakia) M Navrátilová	6	6
(Austria) P Pokorny (Austria) S Pachta	6	8
(New Zealand) J McDonald (United States) P Hogan	2	6

Fourth round
(Czechoslovakia) J Kodeš (Czechoslovakia) M Navrátilová	6	3	6
(Austria) P Pokorny (Austria) S Pachta	4	6	3

==== Section 8 ====
First round

Second round
(Australia) K Fletcher (United Kingdom) J Cooper	6	6
(Netherlands) F Hemmes (Netherlands) T Zwaan	4	4
(United Kingdom) J Paish (Australia) W Paish	9	6
(United Kingdom) P Curtis (United Kingdom) F Taylor	8	4
(Soviet Union) T Kakulia (Soviet Union) M Kroschina	4	6	3
(Japan) J Kamiwazumi (Japan) K Sawamatsu	6	3	6
(United Kingdom) S Warboys (Australia) D Fromholtz	8	2
2	(Australia) O Davidson (United States) BJ King	9	6

Third round
(Australia) K Fletcher (United Kingdom) J Cooper	3	2
(United Kingdom) J Paish (Australia) W Paish	6	6
(Japan) J Kamiwazumi (Japan) K Sawamatsu	4	1
2	(Australia) O Davidson (United States) BJ King	6	6

Fourth round
(United Kingdom) J Paish (Australia) W Paish	1	1
2	(Australia) O Davidson (United States) BJ King	6	6
