= 1970 French Open – Men's singles qualifying =

Men's singles qualifying
- 1970 French Open

Events
Singles	men	women		boys	girls
Doubles	men	women	mixed	boys	girls
WC Singles	men	women	quad
WC Doubles	men	women	quad
Legends	−45	45+	women
← 1969 ·	French Open	· 1971 →

Players who neither had high enough rankings nor received wild cards to enter the main draw of the annual French Open Tennis Championships participated in a qualifying tournament held in the week before the event.

== Qualifiers ==
1. (France) Jean Lovera
2. (Jamaica) Richard Russell
3. (Japan) Jun Kuki
4. (South Africa) William Freer
5. (France) Jacques Thamin
6. (France) Jean-Paul Meyer
7. (United States) Dan O'Bryant
8. (France) Christian Duxin
9. (South Africa) Julian Krinsky
10. (Ecuador) Eduardo Zuleta
11. (France) Wanaro N'Godrella
12. (France) Pierre Joly
13. (Hungary) Róbert Machán
14. (France) François Matheu
15. (France) Jean-François Caujolle
16. (Australia) Bob Howe

== Lucky losers ==
1. (Australia) Greg Perkins
2. (Australia) Bob Rheinberger

== Qualifying draw ==
=== Key ===
- Q = Qualifier
- WC = Wild card
- LL = Lucky loser
- Alt = Alternate
- ITF = ITF entry
- PR = Protected ranking
- SR = Special ranking
- SE = Special exempt
- JE = Junior exempt
- JR = Junior Accelerator Programme entrant
- CO = College Accelerator Programme entrant
- NG = Next Gen Accelerator Program entrant
- w/o = Walkover
- r = Retired
- d = Defaulted

=== First qualifier ===
First round

Second round
(France) Jean Lovera	6	6	7
(Australia) Richard Howes	0	2	5
(France) Thierry Bernasconi
(France) Alain Bresson	w/o

Qualifying competition
(France) Jean Lovera
(France) Thierry Bernasconi	w/o

=== Second qualifier ===
First round

Second round
(Australia) Lindsay Straney
(India) Gaurav Misra	w/o
(Jamaica) Richard Russell	6	6	6
(France) Jean-Pierre Olivier	2	2	4

Qualifying competition
(Australia) Lindsay Straney	3	2	0
(Jamaica) Richard Russell	6	6	6

=== Third qualifier ===
First round

Second round
(France) Alain Bouteleux
(Brazil) Octavio Piva	w/o
(Japan) Jun Kuki	2	6	6	6
(United States) Stephen Fiske	6	2	0	4

Qualifying competition
(France) Alain Bouteleux	2	3	2
(Japan) Jun Kuki	6	6	6

=== Fourth qualifier ===
First round
4	(Canada) Tony Bardsley
5	(Italy) Giovanni Capozza	w/o
2	(France) Jean-Claude Fauvet
7	(France) Philippe Fremoit	w/o
3	(South Africa) William Freer	7	6	4	1	6
6	(France) Jean-Roger Cadot	5	4	6	6	3

Second round
(France) Bernard Paul	6	2	6	2
(Canada) Tony Bardsley	4	6	4	1^{r}
(France) Jean-Claude Fauvet	w/o
(South Africa) William Freer

Qualifying competition
(France) Bernard Paul	0	6	6	3	2
(South Africa) William Freer	6	2	4	6	6

=== Fifth qualifier ===
First round
1	(Australia) Grant Kerr	6	6	6
8	(United States) Robert Trappenberg	1	0	1
4	(France) Alain Benoît-Levy
5	(France) Joseph Mateo	w/o
2	(France) Jacques Thamin	0	6	10	6
7	(Colombia) Uriel Oquendo	6	1	8	0
3	(France) Yvon Le Blanc
6	(Socialist Federal Republic of Yugoslavia) Zlatko Ivančić	w/o

Second round
(Australia) Grant Kerr
(France) Alain Benoît-Levy	w/o
(France) Jacques Thamin	6	6	4	6
(France) Yvon Le Blanc	2	1	6	2

Qualifying competition
(Australia) Grant Kerr	12	6	0
(France) Jacques Thamin	14	8	6

=== Sixth qualifier ===
First round
1	(South Africa) Lewis Sylvester	6	6	6
8	(Venezuela) Amable Plaza	0	1	0
4	(France) Jean-Paul Meyer	6	6	6
5	(United States) Norman Perry	4	3	4
2	(France) Pierre Loizeau
7	(West Germany) Rainer Kuhlmey	w/o
3	(United Kingdom) John Paish	6	6	6
6	(Malaysia) Sharin Osman	0	1	2

Second round
(South Africa) Lewis Sylvester	4	2	3
(France) Jean-Paul Meyer	6	6	6
(France) Pierre Loizeau	3	5	1
(United Kingdom) John Paish	6	7	6

Qualifying competition
(France) Jean-Paul Meyer	2	6	6	6
(United Kingdom) John Paish	6	3	4	2

=== Seventh qualifier ===
First round
1	(United States) Dan O'Bryant	6	6	6
8	(Morocco) Ali Laroussi	1	4	2
4	(Australia) Ross Case
5	(Belgium) Michel De Marneffe	w/o
2	(Indonesia) Atet Wijono
7	(Italy) Paolo Bertolucci	w/o
3	(France) François Battegay	6	6	6
6	(United Kingdom) David Segal	3	2	2

Second round
(United States) Dan O'Bryant	7	6	6
(Australia) Ross Case	5	1	4
(Indonesia) Atet Wijono	5	6	6	6
(France) François Battegay	7	4	1	3

Qualifying competition
(United States) Dan O'Bryant	6	7	6
(Indonesia) Atet Wijono	3	5	1

=== Eighth qualifier ===
First round
1	(France) Christian Duxin
8	(Australia) Jim Moore	w/o
4	(Indonesia) Sutarjo Sugiarto
5	(New Zealand) Jeff Simpson	w/o
2	(Australia) Allan McDonald	6	6	0	6
7	(Italy) Roberto Lombardi	3	2	6	4
3	(Czechoslovakia) Štěpán Koudelka	6	8	6
6	(Canada) Lew Grinnan	1	6	2

Second round
(France) Christian Duxin	1	6	7	7
(Indonesia) Sutarjo Sugiarto	6	1	5	5
(Australia) Allan McDonald	2	4	6	6	5
(Czechoslovakia) Štěpán Koudelka	6	6	4	2	7

Qualifying competition
(France) Christian Duxin
(Czechoslovakia) Štěpán Koudelka	w/o

=== Ninth qualifier ===
First round
1	(South Africa) Julian Krinsky	3	3	6	6	6
8	(Poland) Andrzej Licis	6	6	0	3	1
4	(France) François Pierson
5	(France) Jean-Pierre Bombardier	w/o
2	(South Africa) Mel Baleson	10	6	1	6
7	(United Kingdom) Stephen Warboys	8	1	6	2
3	(France) Éric Loliée
6	(France) Marc Boulle	w/o

Second round
(South Africa) Julian Krinsky
(France) François Pierson	w/o
(South Africa) Mel Baleson	6	6	6
(France) Éric Loliée	1	1	4

Qualifying competition
(South Africa) Julian Krinsky	6	6	7
(South Africa) Mel Baleson	3	2	5

=== Tenth qualifier ===
First round
1	(Italy) Vincenzo Franchitti	6	6	6
8	(Morocco) Lahcen Chadli	1	0	4
4	(Ecuador) Eduardo Zuleta	6	6	6
5	(United States) Robert Stock	1	1	1
2	(France) Gérard Pilet	6	6	1	6
7	(Australia) Karl Coombes	1	4	6	3
3	(France) Yves Christiaen
6	(United Kingdom) Peter Curtis	w/o

Second round
(Italy) Vincenzo Franchitti	2	6^{r}
(Ecuador) Eduardo Zuleta	6	1
(France) Gérard Pilet	6	8	6
(France) Yves Christiaen	1	6	0

Qualifying competition
(Ecuador) Eduardo Zuleta	6	4	6	6
(France) Gérard Pilet	4	6	0	3

=== Eleventh qualifier ===
First round
1	(France) Wanaro N'Godrella
8	(Greece) Epaminondas Argyriou	w/o
4	(France) Patrick Béraud
5	(France) Alain Cassaigne	w/o
2	(United States) Dick R. Bohrnstedt	5	3	6	6	6
7	(United States) John Bryant	7	6	1	2	2
3	(South Africa) Frank McDonald
6	(Turkey) Remzi Aydin	w/o

Second round
(France) Wanaro N'Godrella
(France) Patrick Béraud	w/o
(United States) Dick R. Bohrnstedt	6	6	6
(South Africa) Frank McDonald	2	1	2

Qualifying competition
(France) Wanaro N'Godrella	4	6	1	6	6
(United States) Dick R. Bohrnstedt	6	1	6	2	4

=== Twelfth qualifier ===
First round
1	(France) Pierre Joly	7	6	6
8	(United States) Chauncey Steele	5	2	3
4	(Australia) Alvin Gardiner
5	(Morocco) Hana Mansour	w/o
2	(France) Bernard Detroye
7	(France) Sampiero Gavini	w/o
3	(France) Patrice Dominguez	6	6	7
6	(United Kingdom) Simon Partridge	2	2	5

Second round
(France) Pierre Joly	6	3	3	6	6
(Australia) Alvin Gardiner	4	6	6	4	1
(France) Bernard Detroye	w/o
(France) Patrice Dominguez

Qualifying competition
(France) Pierre Joly	3	6	6	6
(France) Patrice Dominguez	6	2	3	3

=== Thirteenth qualifier ===
First round
1	(Australia) Greg Perkins
8	(India) Sashi Menon	w/o
4	(United Kingdom) John Barrett	6	9	6
5	(France) Didier Charlet	3	7	4

Second round
(Australia) Greg Perkins	7	6	6
(United Kingdom) John Barrett	5	2	0
(Hungary) Róbert Machán	6	6	6
(United Kingdom) Colin McHugo	2	1	0

Qualifying competition
(Australia) Greg Perkins	6	2	6	2
(Hungary) Róbert Machán	4	6	8	6

=== Fourteenth qualifier ===
First round

Second round
(France) François Matheu	2	6	6	6
(Belgium) Andre Thielemans	6	4	2	2
(Bolivia) Eduardo Gorostiaga
(Australia) Ian Bidmeade	w/o

Qualifying competition
(France) François Matheu	0	7	6	6	6
(Bolivia) Eduardo Gorostiaga	6	9	4	1	4

=== Fifteenth qualifier ===
First round

Second round
(France) Jean-François Caujolle	6	6	4	9	6
(Jamaica) Lance Lumsden	2	8	6	7	3
(Australia) Bob Rheinberger
(Switzerland) Michel Burgener	w/o

Qualifying competition
(France) Jean-François Caujolle	6	6	6
(Australia) Bob Rheinberger	4	2	2

=== Sixteenth qualifier ===
First round

Second round
(Portugal) Raúl Peralta
(Romania) Ionel Santeiu	w/o
(Australia) Bob Howe
(India) Vijay Amritraj	w/o

Qualifying competition
(Portugal) Raúl Peralta	w/o
(Australia) Bob Howe
