= 1973 Wimbledon Championships – Men's doubles =

Men's doubles
- 1973 Wimbledon Championships

Final
- Champions: (United States) Jimmy Connors (Romania) Ilie Năstase
- Runners-up: (Australia) John Cooper (Australia) Neale Fraser
- Score: 3–6, 6–3, 6–4, 8–9^{(3–7)}, 6–1

Details
- Draw: 64
- Seeds: 4

Events
Singles	men	women		boys	girls
Doubles	men	women	mixed	boys	girls
← 1972 ·	Wimbledon Championships	· 1974 →

Bob Hewitt and Frew McMillan did not defend their title as they participated in the Wimbledon boycott of 1973.

Jimmy Connors and Ilie Năstase defeated John Cooper and Neale Fraser in the final, 3–6, 6–3, 6–4, 8–9^{(3–7)}, 6–1 to win the gentlemen's doubles title at the 1973 Wimbledon Championships.

== Seeds ==
1. (United States) Jimmy Connors / (Romania) Ilie Năstase (champions)
2. (Australia) John Cooper / (Australia) Neale Fraser (final)
3. n/a
4. (Soviet Union) Sergei Likhachev / (Soviet Union) Alex Metreveli (third round)

Click on the seed number of a player to go to their draw section.

== Draw ==
=== Key ===
- Q = Qualifier
- WC = Wild card
- LL = Lucky loser
- Alt = Alternate
- ITF = ITF entry
- PR = Protected ranking
- SR = Special ranking
- SE = Special exempt
- JE = Junior exempt
- JR = Junior Accelerator Programme entrant
- CO = College Accelerator Programme entrant
- NG = Next Gen Accelerator Program entrant
- w/o = Walkover
- r = Retired
- d = Defaulted

=== Finals ===
Quarterfinals
1	(United States) Jimmy Connors (Romania) Ilie Năstase	6	6	5	6
(India) Premjit Lall (India) Jaidip Mukerjea	1	2	7	2
(West Germany) Jürgen Fassbender (West Germany) Karl Meiler	6	9	6
(Czechoslovakia) Jan Kodeš (Czechoslovakia) Jan Kukal	4	8	3
(United Kingdom) David Lloyd (United Kingdom) John Paish	4	2	6	6	9
(United Kingdom) Peter Curtis (United Kingdom) Roger Taylor	6	6	1	3	7
(Australia) Chris Kachel (Australia) Eugene Russo	7	5	6	1	9
2	(Australia) John Cooper (Australia) Neale Fraser	5	7	3	6	11

Semifinals
1	(United States) Jimmy Connors (Romania) Ilie Năstase	9	3	6	6
(West Germany) Jürgen Fassbender (West Germany) Karl Meiler	7	6	4	3
(United Kingdom) David Lloyd (United Kingdom) John Paish	6	3	2	4
2	(Australia) John Cooper (Australia) Neale Fraser	3	6	6	6

Final
1	(United States) Jimmy Connors (Romania) Ilie Năstase	3	6	6	8^{3}	6
2	(Australia) John Cooper (Australia) Neale Fraser	6	3	4	9^{7}	1

=== Top half ===
==== Section 1 ====
First round
1	(United States) J Connors (Romania) I Năstase	7	7	6
(Soviet Union) T Kakulia (Czechoslovakia) F Pála	5	5	2
(Mexico) M Lara (Chile) J Pinto Bravo	5	6	6	0	1
(Australia) O Davidson (Australia) B Phillips-Moore	7	1	3	6	6
(United States) N Holmes (South Africa) J Yuill	6	3	4	6
(United States) M Machette (Mexico) R Ramírez	3	6	6	8
(Japan) J Kamiwazumi (Japan) T Sakai	8	6	6	9
(India) G Misra (India) C Mukerjea	9	3	2	8
(West Germany) H Engert (West Germany) F Gebert	4	6	3	4
(United Kingdom) J Feaver (United Kingdom) S Warboys	6	3	6	6
(West Germany) H-J Plötz (West Germany) H-J Pohmann	6	6	6
(Greece) N Kelaidis (Japan) J Kuki	1	2	3
(Australia) A McDonald (New Zealand) J Simpson
(Australia) S Ball (Australia) R Giltinan	w/o
(India) P Lall (India) J Mukerjea	8	3	6	9
(Poland) T Nowicki (Austria) P Pokorny	6	6	3	8

Second round
1	(United States) J Connors (Romania) I Năstase	6	8	6	8
(Australia) O Davidson (Australia) B Phillips-Moore	4	9	3	6
(United States) M Machette (Mexico) R Ramírez	4	6	5	6	6
(Japan) J Kamiwazumi (Japan) T Sakai	6	4	7	4	4
(United Kingdom) J Feaver (United Kingdom) S Warboys	7	8	9	6	6
(West Germany) H-J Plötz (West Germany) H-J Pohmann	9	9	7	2	4
(Australia) A McDonald (New Zealand) J Simpson	8	3	4
(India) P Lall (India) J Mukerjea	9	6	6

Third round
1	(United States) J Connors (Romania) I Năstase	6	5	3	8	8
(United States) M Machette (Mexico) R Ramírez	4	7	6	6	6
(United Kingdom) J Feaver (United Kingdom) S Warboys	5	3	8
(India) P Lall (India) J Mukerjea	7	6	9

Quarterfinals
1	(United States) J Connors (Romania) I Năstase	6	6	5	6
(India) P Lall (India) J Mukerjea	1	2	7	2

==== Section 2 ====
First round
4	(Soviet Union) S Likhachev (Soviet Union) A Metreveli	4	6	4	6	6
(Australia) G Perkins (Soviet Union) K Pugaev	6	4	6	4	3
(South Africa) B Anstey (Australia) M Edmondson	6	6	8
(South Africa) R Buwalda (Rhodesia) C Dowdeswell	4	4	6
(Australia) F Sedgman (United States) V Seixas	3	5	2
(United Kingdom) M Farrell (United Kingdom) J Lloyd	6	7	6
(West Germany) J Fassbender (West Germany) K Meiler	9	6	7
(Colombia) I Molina (Colombia) J Velasco	8	2	5
(Japan) K Hirai (Japan) K Tanabe	2	4	9	4
(United States) H Fitzgibbon (United States) R McKinley	6	6	8	6
(Italy) E di Matteo (Italy) A Zugarelli	4	1	6
(Czechoslovakia) J Kodeš (Czechoslovakia) J Kukal	6	6	8
(Australia) P McNamee (New Zealand) R Simpson	6	2	3	4
(United Kingdom) J Clifton (United Kingdom) S Matthews	3	6	6	6
(United Kingdom) A Compton-Dando (United Kingdom) P Siviter	2	3	2
(Australia) W Durham (Australia) C Letcher	6	6	6

Second round
4	(Soviet Union) S Likhachev (Soviet Union) A Metreveli	6	6	9
(South Africa) B Anstey (Australia) M Edmondson	3	4	7
(United Kingdom) M Farrell (United Kingdom) J Lloyd	4	6	7	4
(West Germany) J Fassbender (West Germany) K Meiler	6	1	9	6
(United States) H Fitzgibbon (United States) R McKinley	6	5	6	8
(Czechoslovakia) J Kodeš (Czechoslovakia) J Kukal	8	7	2	9
(United Kingdom) J Clifton (United Kingdom) S Matthews	6	6	6
(Australia) W Durham (Australia) C Letcher	4	2	3

Third round
4	(Soviet Union) S Likhachev (Soviet Union) A Metreveli	6	8	9	3	12
(West Germany) J Fassbender (West Germany) K Meiler	4	9	8	6	14
(Czechoslovakia) J Kodeš (Czechoslovakia) J Kukal	6	6	6
(United Kingdom) J Clifton (United Kingdom) S Matthews	2	2	4

Quarterfinals
(West Germany) J Fassbender (West Germany) K Meiler	6	9	6
(Czechoslovakia) J Kodeš (Czechoslovakia) J Kukal	4	8	3

=== Bottom half ===
==== Section 3 ====
First round
(United Kingdom) D Lloyd (United Kingdom) J Paish	7	9	4	6
(United States) D Crawford (United States) J Fort	5	7	6	4
(India) A Amritraj (India) V Amritraj	5	8	4
(South Africa) D Joubert (South Africa) B Mitton	7	9	6
(United States) R Bohrnstedt (United States) W Brown	6	6	6
(United States) G Fritz (United States) H Fritz	3	2	4
(Mexico) L Baraldi (Ecuador) E Zuleta	6	2
(Australia) G Braun (Australia) D Carter	4	3^{r}
(Italy) C Barazzutti (Italy) P Toci
(United States) S Messmer (Mexico) E Montaño	w/o
(United States) D Bleckinger (United States) W Martin	9	8	6	8
(Hungary) S Baranyi (Hungary) R Machán	8	9	4	6
(United Kingdom) A Mills (United Kingdom) R Wilson	6	9	9
(Paraguay) V Pecci (Argentina) T Quintin	4	8	8
(Mexico) R Chávez (Bolivia) E Gorostiaga	1	1	3
(United Kingdom) P Curtis (United Kingdom) R Taylor	6	6	6

Second round
(United Kingdom) D Lloyd (United Kingdom) J Paish	4	6	6	8
(South Africa) D Joubert (South Africa) B Mitton	6	3	2	6
(United States) R Bohrnstedt (United States) W Brown	6	8	6
(Mexico) L Baraldi (Ecuador) E Zuleta	2	6	1
(Italy) C Barazzutti (Italy) P Toci	0	7	4	2
(United States) D Bleckinger (United States) W Martin	6	5	6	6
(United Kingdom) A Mills (United Kingdom) R Wilson	3	4	8
(United Kingdom) P Curtis (United Kingdom) R Taylor	6	6	9

Third round
(United Kingdom) D Lloyd (United Kingdom) J Paish	8	4	8	6	6
(United States) R Bohrnstedt (United States) W Brown	6	6	9	4	4
(United States) D Bleckinger (United States) W Martin	3	5	4
(United Kingdom) P Curtis (United Kingdom) R Taylor	6	7	6

Quarterfinals
(United Kingdom) D Lloyd (United Kingdom) J Paish	4	2	6	6	9
(United Kingdom) P Curtis (United Kingdom) R Taylor	6	6	1	3	7

==== Section 4 ====
First round
(Australia) S Myers (United Kingdom) J Smith	1	4	1
(Italy) P Marzano (Italy) N Pietrangeli	6	6	6
(United Kingdom) J Crump (United Kingdom) C McHugo	3	3	4
(Argentina) E Álvarez (United States) J Austin	6	6	6
(Australia) C Kachel (Australia) E Russo
(Bulgaria) B Pampoulov (Bulgaria) M Pampoulov	w/o
(United States) A Neely (India) J Singh
(United States) A Guerry (Australia) R Keldie	w/o
(United States) A Mayer (United States) E Scott	7	3	2	8	6
(Czechoslovakia) J Hřebec (Czechoslovakia) V Zedník	5	6	6	6	3
(Australia) K Hancock (Australia) W Mason	6	9	6
(Netherlands) F Hemmes (Netherlands) J Hordijk	4	8	3
(United Kingdom) R Drysdale (United Kingdom) G Newton	2	0	1
(Sweden) B Borg (Sweden) T Svensson	6	6	6
(United Kingdom) M Collins (United Kingdom) R Lewis	2	3	6	7	3
2	(Australia) J Cooper (Australia) N Fraser	6	6	3	5	6

Second round
(Italy) P Marzano (Italy) N Pietrangeli	3	8	3	3
(Argentina) E Álvarez (United States) J Austin	6	6	6	6
(Australia) C Kachel (Australia) E Russo	6	6	9
(United States) A Neely (India) J Singh	3	2	8
(United States) A Mayer (United States) E Scott	3	6	6	3	4
(Australia) K Hancock (Australia) W Mason	6	2	3	6	6
(Sweden) B Borg (Sweden) T Svensson	1	4	2
2	(Australia) J Cooper (Australia) N Fraser	6	6	6

Third round
(Argentina) E Álvarez (United States) J Austin	5	6	5	6	3
(Australia) C Kachel (Australia) E Russo	7	4	7	2	6
(Australia) K Hancock (Australia) W Mason	3	6	6	3
2	(Australia) J Cooper (Australia) N Fraser	6	4	8	6

Quarterfinals
(Australia) C Kachel (Australia) E Russo	7	5	6	1	9
2	(Australia) J Cooper (Australia) N Fraser	5	7	3	6	11
