= 1973 Wimbledon Championships – Men's singles =

Men's singles
- 1973 Wimbledon Championships

Final
- Champion: (Czechoslovakia) Jan Kodeš
- Runner-up: (Soviet Union) Alex Metreveli
- Score: 6–1, 9–8^{(7–5)}, 6–3

Details
- Draw: 128 (32 Q )
- Seeds: 8

Events
Singles	men	women		boys	girls
Doubles	men	women	mixed	boys	girls
← 1972 ·	Wimbledon Championships	· 1974 →

Jan Kodeš defeated Alex Metreveli in the final, 6–1, 9–8^{(7–5)}, 6–3 to win the gentlemen's singles tennis title at the 1973 Wimbledon Championships. It was his first Wimbledon title and third and last major singles title overall. The final included a tie-break played at 8–8 in the second set; it was the first ever Wimbledon singles final to feature a tie-break.

81 of the top Association of Tennis Professionals (ATP) players, including reigning champion Stan Smith, boycotted Wimbledon in 1973 in protest against the suspension of Nikola Pilić by the Yugoslav Tennis Association, supported by the International Lawn Tennis Federation (ILTF). This resulted in numerous qualifiers and lucky losers playing the tournament; of the 16 players originally seeded at the tournament, only four (Ilie Năstase, Metreveli, Kodeš, and Roger Taylor) participated.

The 1973 Wimbledon men's final was the first Grand Slam singles final reached by a Soviet player, and as of 2025, it remains the only Wimbledon men's final to feature a player from the USSR or any former Soviet country.

== Seeds ==
1. (Romania) Ilie Năstase (fourth round)
2. (Czechoslovakia) Jan Kodeš (champion)
3. (United Kingdom) Roger Taylor (semifinals)
4. (Soviet Union) Alex Metreveli (final)
5. (United States) Jimmy Connors (quarterfinals)
6. (Sweden) Björn Borg (quarterfinals)
7. (Australia) Owen Davidson (fourth round)
8. (West Germany) Jürgen Fassbender (quarterfinals)

Click on the seed number of a player to go to their draw section.

The original seeding list before the boycott was:

1. (United States) Stan Smith
2. (Romania) Ilie Năstase
3. (Australia) John Newcombe
4. (United States) Arthur Ashe
5. (Australia) Ken Rosewall
6. (Netherlands) Tom Okker
7. (United States) Marty Riessen
8. (Australia) Roy Emerson
9. (United States) Tom Gorman
10. (United States) Cliff Richey
11. (Italy) Adriano Panatta
12. (Spain) Manuel Orantes
13. (Soviet Union) Alex Metreveli
14. (United States) Bob Lutz
15. (Czechoslovakia) Jan Kodeš
16. (United Kingdom) Roger Taylor

== Draw ==
=== Key ===
- Q = Qualifier
- WC = Wild card
- LL = Lucky loser
- Alt = Alternate
- ITF = ITF entry
- PR = Protected ranking
- SR = Special ranking
- SE = Special exempt
- JE = Junior exempt
- JR = Junior Accelerator Programme entrant
- CO = College Accelerator Programme entrant
- NG = Next Gen Accelerator Program entrant
- w/o = Walkover
- r = Retired
- d = Defaulted

=== Finals ===
Quarterfinals
(United States) Sandy Mayer	3	4	6	6	6
8	(West Germany) Jürgen Fassbender	6	6	3	4	4
4	(Soviet Union) Alex Metreveli	8	6	5	6
5	(United States) Jimmy Connors	6	2	7	4
6	(Sweden) Björn Borg	1	8	6	3	5
3	(United Kingdom) Roger Taylor	6	6	3	6	7
(India) Vijay Amritraj	4	6	6	3	5
2	(Czechoslovakia) Jan Kodeš	6	3	4	6	7

Semifinals
(United States) Sandy Mayer	3	6	3	4
4	(Soviet Union) Alex Metreveli	6	3	6	6
3	(United Kingdom) Roger Taylor	9	7	7	4	5
2	(Czechoslovakia) Jan Kodeš	8	9	5	6	7

Final
4	(Soviet Union) Alex Metreveli	1	8^{5}	3
2	(Czechoslovakia) Jan Kodeš	6	9^{7}	6

=== Top half ===
==== Section 1 ====
First round
1	(Romania) Ilie Năstase	6	7	6
Q	(West Germany) Hans-Joachim Plötz	3	5	2
(Colombia) Iván Molina	6	9	8	6
LL	(United States) Bill Brown	4	7	9	3
LL	(United Kingdom) Phil Siviter	4	9	1	2
(Austria) Hans Kary	6	7	6	6
Q	(Japan) Toshiro Sakai	6	3	9	6
LL	(United States) Ken McMillan	1	6	8	4
Q	(Romania) Ionel Sânteiu	7	6	4	5	5
LL	(Mexico) Roberto Chávez	5	4	6	7	7
(United States) Sandy Mayer	7	6	6
LL	(United Kingdom) Richard Lewis	5	4	3
Q	(United States) Steve Messmer	5	2	4
LL	(United Kingdom) Clay Iles	7	6	6
Q	(India) Gaurav Misra	4	4	1
LL	(Czechoslovakia) Vladimír Zedník	6	6	6

Second round
1	(Romania) I Năstase	6	7	7	6
(Colombia) I Molina	2	9	5	1
(Austria) H Kary	1	3	6	3
Q	(Japan) T Sakai	6	6	3	6
LL	(Mexico) R Chávez	9	1	7	2
(United States) A Mayer	7	6	9	6
LL	(United Kingdom) C Iles	3	3	6	2
LL	(Czechoslovakia) V Zedník	6	6	4	6

Third round
1	(Romania) I Năstase	7	6	6
Q	(Japan) T Sakai	5	2	4
(United States) A Mayer	8	7	6
LL	(Czechoslovakia) V Zedník	6	5	0

Fourth round
1	(Romania) I Năstase	4	6	8	4
(United States) A Mayer	6	8	6	6

==== Section 2 ====
First round
8	(West Germany) Jürgen Fassbender	8	6	6	6
(Hungary) István Gulyás	6	8	3	3
LL	(Spain) José Moreno	6	6	6
LL	(United Kingdom) Michael Collins	4	3	3
(Australia) Ray Keldie	7	6	4	6
LL	(United States) Dick Bohrnstedt	5	3	6	3
Q	(West Germany) Frank Gebert	8	8	5	7
Q	(Sweden) Tenny Svensson	6	9	7	9
(Italy) Nicola Pietrangeli	6	6	5	2
LL	(New Zealand) Jeff Simpson	8	2	7	6
(Australia) Neale Fraser	4	5	6
LL	(United States) James "Chico" Hagey	6	7	8
(United Kingdom) John Paish	7	4	5	2
Q	(Mexico) Marcelo Lara	5	6	7	6
LL	(United Kingdom) Colin McHugo	3	4	4
(West Germany) Hans-Jürgen Pohmann	6	6	6

Second round
8	(West Germany) J Fassbender	6	6	6
LL	(Spain) J Moreno	3	4	4
(Australia) R Keldie	6	8	6	6
Q	(Sweden) T Svensson	4	9	0	4
LL	(New Zealand) J Simpson	8	6	8	6
LL	(United States) J Hagey	6	4	9	3
Q	(Mexico) M Lara	6	5	6	1	5
(West Germany) H-J Pohmann	2	7	2	6	7

Third round
8	(West Germany) J Fassbender	6	5	4	7	15
(Australia) R Keldie	2	7	6	5	13
LL	(New Zealand) J Simpson	6	5	3	4
(West Germany) H-J Pohmann	4	7	6	6

Fourth round
8	(West Germany) J Fassbender	6	7	6
(West Germany) H-J Pohmann	2	5	3

==== Section 3 ====
First round
4	(Soviet Union) Alex Metreveli	6	6	9
LL	(United Kingdom) Stanley Matthews	3	4	8
Q	(Australia) Bob Giltinan	6	6	6
LL	(Hungary) Róbert Machán	3	4	3
LL	(Australia) Greg Braun	4	4	2
Q	(Australia) Allan McDonald	6	6	6
(Australia) John Cooper	6	8	6	9
(United States) Herb Fitzgibbon	3	9	3	7
LL	(United States) Pancho Walthall	6	3	6	6	6
(Poland) Tadeusz Nowicki	4	6	8	3	2
LL	(India) Chiradip Mukerjea	6	7	8	6
Q	(West Germany) Hans Engert	4	5	9	4
Q	(United States) Gene Scott	9	3	8	4	4
(United Kingdom) John Feaver	8	6	6	6	6
LL	(Australia) Cliff Letcher	5	6	6	6
LL	(United States) Robert Stock	7	4	3	1

Second round
4	(Soviet Union) A Metreveli	6	6	7
Q	(Australia) R Giltinan	4	2	5
Q	(Australia) A McDonald	4	6	6	5	7
(Australia) J Cooper	6	4	4	7	9
LL	(United States) F Walthall	3	6	6	9
LL	(India) C Mukerjea	6	1	1	8
(United Kingdom) J Feaver	9	6	9
LL	(Australia) C Letcher	8	4	8

Third round
4	(Soviet Union) A Metreveli	6	6	6
(Australia) J Cooper	2	3	1
LL	(United States) F Walthall	5	1	8
(United Kingdom) J Feaver	7	6	9

Fourth round
4	(Soviet Union) A Metreveli	8	6	6
(United Kingdom) J Feaver	6	4	1

==== Section 4 ====
First round
5	(United States) Jimmy Connors	6	6	6
LL	(United Kingdom) Mark Farrell	4	3	4
(United Kingdom) David Lloyd	6	0	6	6
(Italy) Corrado Barazzutti	2	6	1	1
(Soviet Union) Sergei Likhachev	3	4	6	4
Q	(Australia) Bill Durham	6	6	3	6
LL	(United States) Thomas Karp	4	6	3
LL	(New Zealand) Russell Simpson	6	8	6
Q	(United Kingdom) John Clifton	4	6	6	4	3
(Chile) Jaime Pinto Bravo	6	3	2	6	6
Q	(Rhodesia) Colin Dowdeswell	3	6	4	5
LL	(South Africa) Deon Joubert	6	4	6	7
LL	(France) Thierry Bernasconi	6	1	3
LL	(South Africa) Bernard Mitton	8	6	6
Q	(Netherlands) Jan Hordijk	7	2	2
(United States) Zan Guerry	9	6	6

Second round
5	(United States) J Connors	6	6	5	6
(United Kingdom) D Lloyd	4	3	7	2
Q	(Australia) W Durham	8	9	5	6	2
LL	(New Zealand) R Simpson	9	7	7	3	6
(Chile) J Pinto Bravo	6	2	2	6	3
LL	(South Africa) D Joubert	4	6	6	2	6
LL	(South Africa) B Mitton	7	2	4	7	7
(United States) A Guerry	5	6	6	5	5

Third round
5	(United States) J Connors	6	6	6
LL	(New Zealand) R Simpson	2	1	2
LL	(South Africa) D Joubert	6	9	4	1	7
LL	(South Africa) B Mitton	4	8	6	6	9

Fourth round
5	(United States) J Connors	6	6	6
LL	(South Africa) B Mitton	3	3	2

=== Bottom half ===
==== Section 5 ====
First round
(Socialist Federal Republic of Yugoslavia) Boro Jovanović	5	6	3
Q	(Australia) Syd Ball	7	8	6
(France) Jean-Loup Rouyer	0	2	2
(Hungary) Szabolcs Baranyi	6	6	6
LL	(Japan) Kiyoshi Tanabe	4	3	4
LL	(Switzerland) Petr Kanderal	6	6	6
(Soviet Union) Teimuraz Kakulia	6	6	3	0	4
(United States) Jeff Austin	3	4	6	6	6
LL	(United States) Greg Peebles	7	4	2
(West Germany) Karl Meiler	9	6	6
LL	(India) Jasjit Singh	3	7	6	3
Q	(United States) Billy Martin	6	9	2	6
(Belgium) Patrick Hombergen	6	6	6
(Australia) Stephen Myers	3	3	1
Q	(India) Premjit Lall	3	4	8^{18}
6	(Sweden) Björn Borg	6	6	9^{20}

Second round
Q	(Australia) S Ball	0^{r}
(Hungary) S Baranyi	1
LL	(Switzerland) P Kanderal	8	3	3
(United States) J Austin	9	6	6
(West Germany) K Meiler	6	6	9
Q	(United States) W Martin	1	4	8
(Belgium) P Hombergen	4	2	4
6	(Sweden) B Borg	6	6	6

Third round
(Hungary) S Baranyi	2	5	6	6	6
(United States) J Austin	6	7	3	4	4
(West Germany) K Meiler	4	4	6	6	3
6	(Sweden) B Borg	6	6	3	2	6

Fourth round
(Hungary) S Baranyi	3	2	8	7	1
6	(Sweden) B Borg	6	6	6	5	6

==== Section 6 ====
First round
(Czechoslovakia) František Pála	6	1	6	7
LL	(United States) Dan Bleckinger	3	6	3	5
LL	(United States) Doug Crawford	4	2	4
LL	(United States) Norman Holmes	6	6	6
(United States) Robert McKinley	6	6	6
LL	(Australia) Paul McNamee	4	1	0
Q	(Australia) Eugene Russo	6	2	9	4	7
LL	(Japan) Jun Kuki	1	6	8	6	9
(Czechoslovakia) Jiří Hřebec	6	6	7
(Australia) Frank Sedgman	0	4	5
(Italy) Antonio Zugarelli	6	6	6
LL	(Socialist Federal Republic of Yugoslavia) Dragan Stojović	3	2	4
LL	(Australia) John James	7	2	6	6	2
(West Germany) Harald Elschenbroich	5	6	3	8	6
Q	(France) Jean-Louis Haillet	2	3	3
3	(United Kingdom) Roger Taylor	6	6	6

Second round
(Czechoslovakia) F Pála	6	6	0	6	5
LL	(United States) N Holmes	8	2	6	1	7
(United States) R McKinley	6	3	6	6
LL	(Japan) J Kuki	4	6	2	2
(Czechoslovakia) J Hřebec	7	1	4	7	6
(Italy) A Zugarelli	5	6	6	5	2
(West Germany) H Elschenbroich	3	2	2
3	(United Kingdom) R Taylor	6	6	6

Third round
LL	(United States) N Holmes	2	6	5	5
(United States) R McKinley	6	3	7	7
(Czechoslovakia) J Hřebec	1	7	4	2
3	(United Kingdom) R Taylor	6	5	6	6

Fourth round
(United States) R McKinley	1	5	8	5
3	(United Kingdom) R Taylor	6	7	6	7

==== Section 7 ====
First round
(United Kingdom) John Lloyd	8	4	6	6	6
LL	(France) Jean-François Caujolle	9	6	3	4	3
LL	(Australia) Paul Kronk	7	5	4	6	4
Q	(Australia) Keith Hancock	5	7	6	3	6
(Belgium) Bernard Mignot	6	6	6
Q	(Austria) Peter Pokorny	1	1	3
(India) Vijay Amritraj	6	6	6
LL	(Australia) Harold Turnbull	4	2	4
LL	(Soviet Union) Konstantin Pugaev	6	1	5	8
LL	(Australia) Ernie Ewert	3	6	7	9
(United States) Mike Machette	3	6	6	6
Q	(New Zealand) Tony Parun	6	4	3	1
(Australia) Barry Phillips-Moore	6	9	7
Q	(United Kingdom) Robin Drysdale	3	7	5
LL	(France) Pierre Joly	4	4	4
7	(Australia) Owen Davidson	6	6	6

Second round
(United Kingdom) J Lloyd	7	6	6
Q	(Australia) K Hancock	5	4	4
(Belgium) B Mignot	1	1	2
(India) V Amritraj	6	6	6
LL	(Australia) E Ewert	7	6	6
(United States) M Machette	5	2	3
(Australia) B Phillips-Moore	3	4	3
7	(Australia) O Davidson	6	6	6

Third round
(United Kingdom) J Lloyd	5	4	6	6	5
(India) V Amritraj	7	6	3	2	7
LL	(Australia) E Ewert	1	4	6	3
7	(Australia) O Davidson	6	6	3	6

Fourth round
(India) V Amritraj	7	8	6	6
7	(Australia) O Davidson	5	9	3	4

==== Section 8 ====
First round
(India) Anand Amritraj	6	6	9
LL	(Pakistan) Saeed Meer	4	4	8
LL	(India) Jaidip Mukerjea	7	6	6
LL	(Ecuador) Eduardo Zuleta	5	1	3
Q	(South Africa) Richard Buwalda	5	6	6	6
Q	(Pakistan) Munawar Iqbal	7	3	2	4
LL	(Australia) Greg Perkins	6	6	3	9
(Japan) Jun Kamiwazumi	4	4	6	7
(United Kingdom) Stephen Warboys	2	6	7	6	4
Q	(South Africa) John Yuill	6	4	9	4	6
LL	(United Kingdom) Peter Curtis	6	6	6
Q	(Australia) Graeme Thomson	4	4	2
LL	(Italy) Pietro Marzano	6	6	2	6
(Mexico) Raúl Ramírez	3	4	6	2
LL	(Japan) Kenichi Hirai	6	4	1	3
2	(Czechoslovakia) Jan Kodeš	4	6	6	6

Second round
(India) A Amritraj	6	3	2	4
LL	(India) J Mukerjea	3	6	6	6
Q	(South Africa) R Buwalda	6	3	6	1	8
LL	(Australia) G Perkins	4	6	3	6	10
Q	(South Africa) J Yuill	4	6	1	6	6
LL	(United Kingdom) P Curtis	6	3	6	2	3
LL	(Italy) P Marzano	0	4	3
2	(Czechoslovakia) J Kodeš	6	6	6

Third round
LL	(India) J Mukerjea	9	6	6
LL	(Australia) G Perkins	8	4	3
Q	(South Africa) J Yuill	1	5	2
2	(Czechoslovakia) J Kodeš	6	7	6

Fourth round
LL	(India) J Mukerjea	4	6	4	3
2	(Czechoslovakia) J Kodeš	6	3	6	6

Preceded by 1973 French Open	Grand Slams; Men's singles	Succeeded by 1973 U.S. Open
