= Hans Engert =

German tennis player (1951–2020)

- Country (sports): West Germany
- Born: 22 April 1951; Mannheim, West Germany
- Died: 22 December 2020 (aged 69)
- Plays: Right-handed

Singles
- Career record: 2–11
- Highest ranking: No. 171 (23 Aug 1973)

Grand Slam singles results
- Wimbledon: 1R (1973)

Doubles
- Career record: 2–9

Grand Slam doubles results
- Wimbledon: 1R (1973)

Hans Engert (22 April 1951 – 22 December 2020) was a German professional tennis player.

Born and raised in Mannheim, Engert was a long serving Bundesliga player for Grün-Weiss Mannheim and ranked as high as fifth nationally. In 1973 he qualified for the singles main draw of the Wimbledon Championships, where he lost his first round match in four sets to Chiradip Mukerjea. He later worked as the manager of Steffi Graf.
