= Gaurav Misra =

Indian former tennis player

- Country (sports): India
- Residence: Riverdale, Bronx, U.S.
- Born: 1949 (age 76–77) India
- Turned pro: 1966 (amateur)
- Retired: 1973
- College: St. Xavier's College, Kolkata

Singles
- Career record: 53–25
- Career titles: 2

Grand Slam singles results
- French Open: Q2 (1970)
- Wimbledon: 1R (1973)

Doubles
- Career record: 0–3

Grand Slam doubles results
- Wimbledon: 1R (1973)

Team competitions
- Davis Cup: SF (1969)

Gaurav Misra (born 1949) is an Indian former professional tennis player. He has been the Director of the Columbia University Tennis Center in New York City since 1999.

== Professional career ==
Misra played his first tournament at the Carmarthenshire Championships in 1966 where he reached the quarter-finals stage, before losing to C. Gopala Bhupathi. In 1970 he won his first title at the All India Hard Court Championships in Madras, where he beat Anand Amritraj. The same year Misra received a first round bye at the 1970 French Open qualifying but was unable to play his first round qualifying match against Australia's Lindsay Straney. In April 1971 he was a finalist at the Bio-Strath Stourbridge tournament, part of the Bio-Strath Circuit that was held at Stourbridge, where he lost to Stanley Matthews. In June 1971 he reached the final of the Bio-Strath Cardiff Open at Cardiff where he lost to the Rhodesian player Andrew Pattison.

He would be given another opportunity to qualify for a grand slam main draw in July 1971 at Wimbledon but he lost in the first round of qualifying to José Guerrero of Spain. In March 1972 he won the Indian International Championships held in Calcutta, where he beat Ramanathan Krishnan. In July 1973, Misra would make his grand slam main draw debut at Wimbledon. He defeated Bernard Mitton and Greg Peebles in qualifying but was defeated by Vladimír Zedník of Czechoslovakia. He also participated in the doubles tournament that year with partner Chiradip Mukerjea where they lost in the first round to the Japanese duo Jun Kamiwazumi and Toshiro Sakai.

In 1973 he failed to defend his former Indian Internatitonal title, that was now an ATP event rebranded as the Indian Open where he was defeated in the third round by Paul Gerken of the United States. He played his final singles tournament at the 1973 Wimbledon Championships.

In team competitions he represented India in several Davis Cup events between 1968 and 1971. In 1969, India defeated Malaysia and Ceylon (now Sri Lanka) to reach the semifinals of the Inter-Zonal Zone. In that match, against Romania in Bucharest, Misra was defeated by Petre Mărmureanu. Misra had been instrumental in India's victory over Malaysia and Ceylon. In 1971, Misra delivered two crucial victories over Ceylon in Colombo.

Misra was forced to retire from tennis due to thyroid issues in the 1970s.

== United States ==
Misra moved to the United States in 1973 following the departure of his friend, Bidynt Goswami (who later became the coach of the men's tennis team at Columbia). He worked as a coach and manager at a tennis club in Hopewell Junction, New York as well as a coach at the Grossinger's Catskill Resort Hotel.

In 1999, Misra became the director of the Dick Savitt Tennis Center in Inwood, Manhattan, the home of the Columbia University men's and women's tennis teams. During his tenure, Misra was a frequent hitting partner of grand slam champion Dick Savitt, and oversaw major changes to the club's infrastructure especially following Winter Storm Jonas.

== Personal life ==
Misra is married to Rene Misra, with whom he has one son, Nick.
