= Matei Pampoulov =

Bulgarian tennis player

- Country (sports): Bulgaria
- Born: 29 April 1949 (age 77) Plovdiv, Bulgaria
- Plays: Right-handed

Singles

Grand Slam singles results
- French Open: Q3 (1975)
- Wimbledon: Q1 (1973)

Doubles

Grand Slam doubles results
- Wimbledon: 1R (1973)
Medal record
Representing Bulgaria
Summer Universiade
Silver medal – second place	1973 Moscow	Doubles
Bronze medal – third place	1977 Sofia	Doubles

Matei Pampoulov (born 29 April 1949) is a Bulgarian former professional tennis player.

== Biography ==
A right-handed player from Plovdiv, Pampoulov appeared in 15 Davis Cup ties for Bulgaria, from 1969 to 1982. His regular doubles partner was twin brother Bozhidar, who unlike his brother was a left-hander. As a combination they won a Bulgarian record five Davis Cup rubbers.

Pampoulov and his brother were in the main draw of the doubles at the 1973 Wimbledon Championships but conceded a walkover. As a singles player he reached the third qualifying round for the 1975 French Open and also featured in Wimbledon qualifying during his career.

His family have continued to pursue the sport, with nephew Luben and niece Elena also competing professionally.
