= Tom Karp =

American tennis player

- Full name: Thomas H. Karp
- Country (sports): United States
- Born: October 13, 1946 (age 78)

Singles
- Career record: 2–4

Grand Slam singles results
- Wimbledon: 1R (1973)
- US Open: 2R (1967)

Thomas Karp (born October 13, 1946) is an American former professional tennis player.

== Biography ==
Karp played tennis for University High School. Stan Smith beat him in the Ojai Valley Tennis Tournament 1964 Boys’ High School final.

Karp, a top-10 nationally ranked junior from Los Angeles, represented the U.S. Junior Davis Cup team and during the late 1960s played for the UCLA Bruins in varsity tennis. He earned All-American honors for the Bruins in 1968, during which year he was co-captain of the team. His professional career included an appearance in the singles main draw of the 1973 Wimbledon Championships.

At the 1969 Maccabiah Games in Israel, he and partner Peter Fishbach were defeated by American Davis Cup player Allen Fox and Ronald Goldman in the semifinals.

During the 1972 Portuguese International Championships, he defeated Nicola Pietrangeli, who had previously won twice at the French Open.
