= Norman Holmes (tennis) =

American tennis player

- Country (sports): United States
- Born: October 5, 1949 (age 76)
- Turned pro: 1969 (amateur tour from 1966)
- Retired: 1983

Singles
- Career record: 144–129
- Career titles: 6
- Highest ranking: No. 70 (June 14, 1976)

Grand Slam singles results
- French Open: 1R (1975, 1976)
- Wimbledon: 3R (1973)
- US Open: 3R (1971)

Doubles
- Career record: 3–30

Grand Slam doubles results
- French Open: 1R (1976)
- Wimbledon: 1R (1973, 1976)

Norman Holmes (born October 5, 1949) is an American former professional tennis player of the 1970s. He was active from 1966 to 1983 where he won 6 career singles titles 4 on the world wide ILTF Circuit and 2 on the ILTF Satellite Circuit.

== Career ==
He played his first tournament at the Southern Connecticut Open in 1966 where he reached the final, but lost to David Barker. Holmes played collegiate tennis for the University of Georgia and was the first person in the program's history to earn four All-SEC selections (1968–71). He was a finalist at the Southern Collegiate Championships in 1968. He won his first singles title in 1971 on the ILTF Circuit at the Mount Snow Open against Ned Weld. In 1973 he was a finalist at the Surrey Hard Court Championships, where he lost to Kim Warwick, the following year in 1974 he won the title against Colin Dowdeswell.

He was also a finalist at the South Florida Open in 1973 where he lost to Eddie Dibbs. In 1976 he toured the Middle East and East Africa where he won two titles the Kenya Open Championships in Nairobi, against John Feaver, and the Mombasa Open against Viorel Sotiriu. By 1977 he was by then playing on the ILTF satellite circuit where he won two more titles, the Austria Satellite Innsbruck against Szabolcs Baranyi, and the Austria Satellite Linz against Vladimir Zednik. In 1983 he played his final tournament at the Austrian International Championships qualifiers.

He had a best singles world ranking of 70 while competing on the professional tour, reaching the singles third round of the 1971 US Open and 1973 Wimbledon Championships.
