= Ashley Compton-Dando =

British tennis player

- Country (sports): Great Britain
- Born: 23 August 1951 (age 73)

Singles

Grand Slam singles results
- Wimbledon: Q1 (1972, 1973)

Doubles

Grand Slam doubles results
- Wimbledon: 1R (1973)

Ashley Compton-Dando (born 23 August 1951) is a British former professional tennis player.

Compton-Dando, a native of Essex, is the son of an antiques dealer. Deaf since birth, he played with the aide of an earphone connected to a short-wave radio, which was strapped to his side. He received coaching from Lew Hoad at a tennis school in Berkhamsted. In 1973 he partnered Phil Siviter in the doubles main draw at Wimbledon.
