= Pancho Walthall =

American tennis player

- Country (sports): United States
- Born: February 16, 1950 (age 76) San Antonio, Texas, U.S.

Singles
- Career record: 8–20

Grand Slam singles results
- Wimbledon: 3R (1973)
- US Open: 1R (1970, 1971, 1972)

Doubles
- Career record: 5–15

Grand Slam doubles results
- French Open: 2R (1973)
- US Open: 2R (1970)

Pancho Walthall (born February 16, 1950) is an American former professional tennis player.

Walthall grew up in San Antonio and was a collegiate tennis player for Trinity University from 1969 to 1972. He won an NCAA team championship in 1972, playing with future professional players Dick Stockton, Paul Gerken, Bob McKinley and Brian Gottfried. After college he competed on tour and made the third round of the 1973 Wimbledon Championships, as a qualifier. He retired in 1977 to coach Saint Mary's Hall and since 1981 has been a tennis pro at the Southern Hills Country Club in Tulsa, Oklahoma. In 2016 he was inducted into the Oklahoma Tennis Hall of Fame.
