= Greg Peebles =

American tennis player

- Full name: Gregory Peebles
- Country (sports): United States
- Died: October 14, 2013

Singles
- Career record: 0–2

Grand Slam singles results
- Wimbledon: 1R (1973)

Doubles
- Career record: 0–1

Gregory Peebles (died October 14, 2013) was an American tennis player.

Peebles grew up in Hawaii, where he topped the junior tennis rankings. In 1973 he qualified for the main draw of the 1973 Wimbledon Championships as a lucky loser and was beaten in the first round by West German Karl Meiler.
