= Eugene Russo =

Australian-American tennis player

- Country (sports): Australia
- Plays: Left-handed

Singles

Grand Slam singles results
- Australian Open: 2R (1965)
- Wimbledon: 1R (1973)

Doubles

Grand Slam doubles results
- Australian Open: 2R (1966)
- Wimbledon: QF (1973)

Eugene Russo is an Australian-American former professional tennis player. He received U.S. citizenship in 2005.

Originally from South Australia, Russo was a left-handed player who ranked as high as three amongst Australian 18-year olds in junior tennis. Instead of turning professional he went to university and completed a master's degree. He married his late wife tennis player Margaret Dunn in 1969 and in the same year the couple moved to Washington D.C., where Russo was employed as a computer programmer.

Russo made his way into professional tennis during the 1970s while he working as a tennis teacher. In 1973 he featured in the singles main draw of the Wimbledon Championships and was beaten by Jun Kuki in the first round, 7–9 in the fifth set. He reached the quarter-finals of the men's doubles event with Chris Kachel and the pair held match points in their loss to second-seeds John Cooper and Neale Fraser.
