= Bill Durham =

Australian tennis player

- Full name: William Durham
- Country (sports): Australia

Singles
- Career record: 5–11
- Highest ranking: No. 202 (3 June 1974)

Grand Slam singles results
- Australian Open: 2R (1974, 1976)
- Wimbledon: 2R (1973)

Doubles
- Career record: 4–7

Grand Slam doubles results
- Australian Open: 2R (1973, 1974, 1975, 1976)
- Wimbledon: 2R (1973)

Grand Slam mixed doubles results
- US Open: 1R (1972)

William Durham is an Australian former professional tennis player. He was a junior doubles champion at the 1972 Australian Open.

Durham reached a career high ranking of 202 while competing on the professional tour and made regular Australian Open appearance in the 1970s. He also qualified for the main draw of the 1973 Wimbledon Championships, where he had a first round win over Soviet Davis Cup player Sergei Likhachev, before losing his next match in five sets to Russell Simpson.
