= Jan Hordijk =

Dutch tennis player

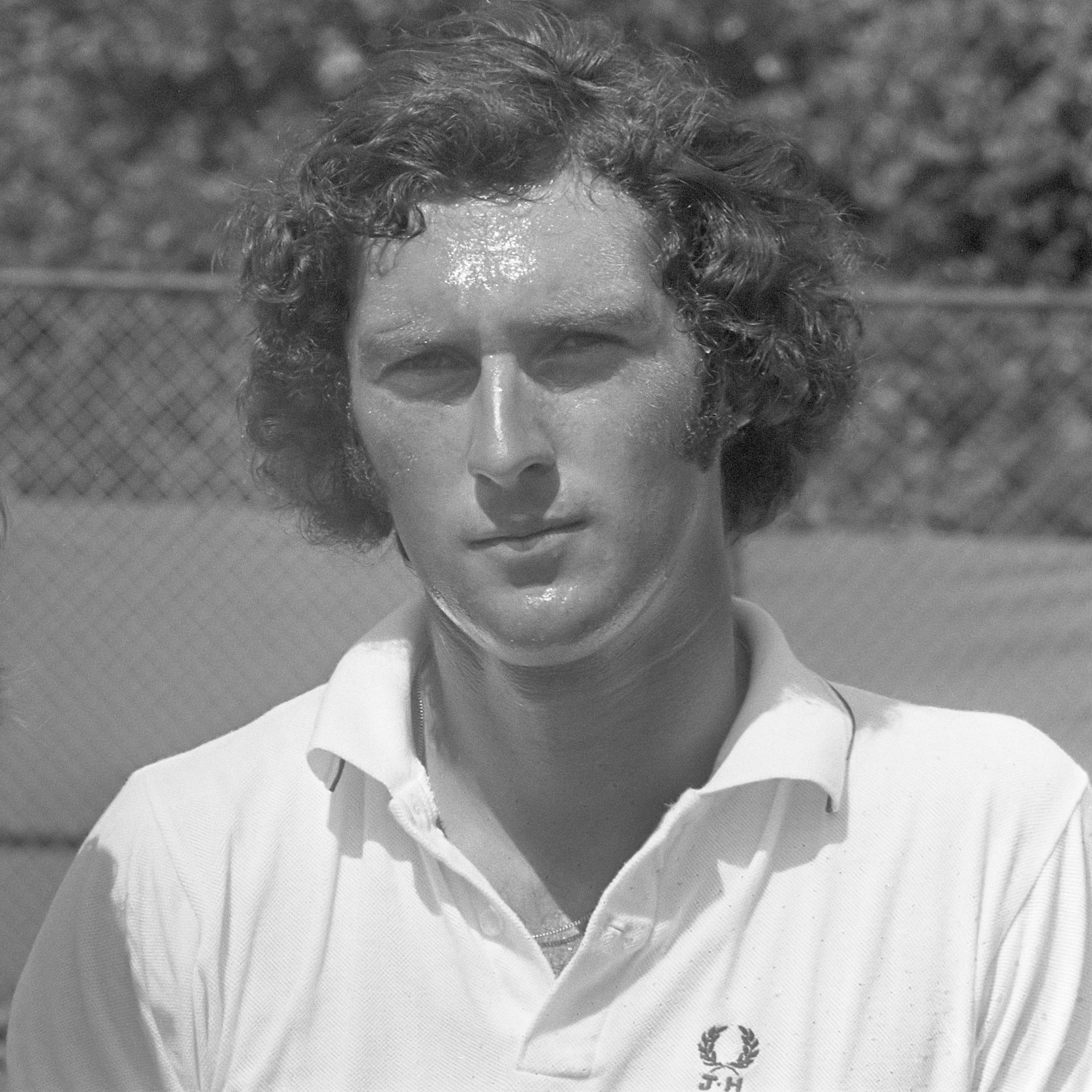
- Country (sports): Netherlands
- Born: 5 February 1950 (age 75); Rotterdam, Netherlands
- Died: 21-05-2025 rotterdam
- Plays: Right-handed

Singles
- Career record: 5–16
- Highest ranking: No. 152 (15 October 1973)

Grand Slam singles results
- Australian Open: 1R (1974)
- Wimbledon: 1R (1973)

Doubles
- Career record: 1–8

Grand Slam doubles results
- Australian Open: 1R (1974)
- Wimbledon: 1R (1973)

Grand Slam mixed doubles results
- Wimbledon: 2R (1973, 1974)

Jan Hordijk (born 5 February 1950) is a Dutch former professional tennis player.

Born in Rotterdam, Hordijk featured in nine Davis Cup ties for the Netherlands, from 1969 to 1974. His Davis Cup career included a singles win over Paolo Bertolucci of Italy and doubles win against a Romanian duo featuring Ilie Năstase.

Hordijk, a two-time national champion in singles, reached a career high ranking of No. 152 in the world, with main draw appearances at the Australian Open and Wimbledon.

== See also ==
- List of Netherlands Davis Cup team representatives
