= Kiyoshi Tanabe (tennis) =

Japanese tennis player (born 1950)

Kiyoshi "Kiyo" Tanabe
- Country (sports): Japan
- Born: 7 October 1950 (age 75) Hyōgo, Japan
- University: Oral Roberts University

Singles
- Highest ranking: No. 174 (29 July 1974)

Grand Slam singles results
- Australian Open: 2R (1972, 1974)
- French Open: 1R (1978)
- Wimbledon: 1R (1973)

Grand Slam doubles results
- Australian Open: 2R (1972, 1974)
- French Open: 2R (1973)
- Wimbledon: 1R (1973)

Kiyoshi "Kiyo" Tanabe (born 7 October 1950) is a Japanese former professional tennis player.

Born in Hyōgo Prefecture, Tanabe represented Japan in four Davis Cup ties during the 1970s.

Tanabe, who played collegiate tennis for Oral Roberts University, won two first round matches at the Australian Open, including in 1974 when he upset 16th seed John Cooper.

== See also ==
- List of Japan Davis Cup team representatives
