= Harold Turnbull =

Australian professional tennis player

- Country (sports): Australia
- Born: 1947 (age 77–78)
- Plays: Left-handed

Singles
- Career record: 2–5

Grand Slam singles results
- French Open: Q1 (1973)
- Wimbledon: 1R (1973)

Doubles
- Career record: 2–3

Grand Slam doubles results
- Australian Open: 3R (1974)
- US Open: 2R (1973)

Grand Slam mixed doubles results
- Wimbledon: 2R (1972, 1973)

Harold Turnbull (born 1947) is an Australian former professional tennis player.

A left-handed player from Queensland, Turnbull was a state champion who was active on tour in the late 1960s and early 1970s. Retiring at the age of 20 due to a back injury, he was appointed tennis director of the Palm Desert Racquet Club in California in 1972. He made a brief comeback and in 1973 featured in the singles main draw at Wimbledon.

Turnbull's younger sister Wendy was a nine-time grand slam doubles champion. One of his brothers, John, was a premiership player for Sandgate in the Queensland Football League.
