= José Moreno (tennis) =

Spanish tennis player (born 1952)

- Full name: José Moreno Tallada
- Country (sports): Spain
- Born: 1952 (age 72–73)

Singles
- Career record: 9–32
- Highest ranking: No. 210 (6 November 1974)

Grand Slam singles results
- French Open: 1R (1977, 1978)
- Wimbledon: 2R (1973)

Doubles
- Career record: 6–17
- Highest ranking: No. 247 (12 December 1976)

Grand Slam doubles results
- French Open: 1R (1978)

José Moreno Tallada (born 1952) was a Spanish international tennis player in the 1970s.

In 1973 at Wimbledon he defeated Mike Collins in three straight sets, but lost to Germany's Jürgen Fassbender. In 1977 at the French Open, he was defeated by South Africa's John Yuill. The following year at the French Open he was defeated by George Hardie.
