= Mike Collins (tennis) =

British tennis player

- Full name: Michael Collins
- Country (sports): Great Britain
- Born: 1 May 1951 (age 74)

Singles
- Career record: 11–12
- Career titles: 2

Grand Slam singles results
- Wimbledon: 1R (1973)

Doubles
- Career record: 2–2

Grand Slam doubles results
- Wimbledon: 1R (1973)

Grand Slam mixed doubles results
- Wimbledon: 1R (1975)

Michael Collins (born 1 May 1951) is a British former professional tennis player.

Collins, a native of London, competed on the professional tour during the 1970s. He featured in the main draw of the 1973 Wimbledon Championships and was runner-up to Jimmy Connors at the 1974 Manchester Open.

Collins won 2 singles titles the Budleigh Salterton Open Championships in 1973, and the East of England Championships in 1975.

Outside of professional tennis, Collins played at the collegiate level in the United States for Oklahoma State University. He has been a long time resident of Victoria, Texas and currently works as a dentist.
