= Roberto Chávez =

Mexican tennis player

- Country (sports): Mexico
- Plays: Right-handed

Singles
- Career record: 4–15
- Highest ranking: No. 172 (1 May 1974)

Grand Slam singles results
- French Open: 1R (1973)
- Wimbledon: 2R (1973)

Doubles
- Career record: 5–11

Grand Slam doubles results
- French Open: 1R (1973, 1974, 1978)
- Wimbledon: 2R (1976)
- US Open: 1R (1977)

Roberto Chávez is a Mexican former professional tennis player.

Chávez reached a career high ranking of 172 in the world while competing on the professional tour in the 1970s. At the 1973 Wimbledon Championships, Chávez came from two sets down to win his first round match against Ionel Sânteiu. His best performance on tour came at Mexico City in 1978, where he beat John Alexander en route to the quarter-finals.

Between 1975 and 1979, Chávez was a member of the Mexico Davis Cup team and appeared in a total of seven ties. He won a two singles rubbers, both against Canada's Réjean Genois. In 1975 he featured in a rare win for Mexico over the United States and in another meeting against the Americans, in the 1977 tournament, took a set off Roscoe Tanner.

== See also ==
- List of Mexico Davis Cup team representatives
