= 1973 Wimbledon Championships – Girls' singles =

Girls' singles
- 1973 Wimbledon Championships

Final
- Champion: (United States) Ann Kiyomura
- Runner-up: (Czechoslovakia) Martina Navrátilová
- Score: 6–4, 7–5

Details
- Draw: 27

Events
Singles	men	women		boys	girls
Doubles	men	women	mixed	boys	girls
← 1972 ·	Wimbledon Championships	· 1974 →

Ann Kiyomura defeated Martina Navrátilová in the final, 6–4, 7–5 to win the girls' singles tennis title at the 1973 Wimbledon Championships.

== Draw ==
=== Key ===
- Q = Qualifier
- WC = Wild card
- LL = Lucky loser
- Alt = Alternate
- SE = Special exempt
- PR = Protected ranking
- ITF = ITF entry
- JE = Junior exempt
- w/o = Walkover
- r = Retired
- d = Defaulted
- SR = Special ranking

=== Finals ===
Semifinals
(South Africa) Linky Boshoff	3	5
(Czechoslovakia) Martina Navrátilová	6	7
(Australia) Dianne Fromholtz	7	3	3
(United States) Ann Kiyomura	5	6	6

Final
(Czechoslovakia) Martina Navrátilová	4	5
(United States) Ann Kiyomura	6	7

=== Top half ===
First round
(Norway) Bente Kjølstad	0	3
(Soviet Union) Natasha Chmyreva	6	6
(Republic of Ireland) N Glenn	3	1
(Sweden) Helena Anliot	6	6
(Netherlands) L Boshouwers	1	0
(Czechoslovakia) Martina Navrátilová	6	6
(Denmark) Helle Sparre	6	3	3
(Socialist Federal Republic of Yugoslavia) Mima Jaušovec	2	6	6
(Switzerland) Susi Eichenberger	3	2
(Japan) Naoko Sato	6	6
(Finland) Leena Pirilä	8	2	7
(Chile) Silvana Urroz	6	6	5

Second round
(South Africa) Linky Boshoff	6	6
(Austria) E Celigoj	0	1
(Soviet Union) N Chmyreva	6	4	4
(Sweden) H Anliot	2	6	6
(Czechoslovakia) M Navrátilová	7	6
(Socialist Federal Republic of Yugoslavia) M Jaušovec	5	3
(Japan) N Sato	6	6
(Finland) L Pirilä	4	3

Quarterfinals
(South Africa) D Boshoff	6	6
(Sweden) H Anliot	1	2
(Czechoslovakia) M Navrátilová	6	7
(Japan) N Sato	2	5

Semifinals
(South Africa) D Boshoff	3	5
(Czechoslovakia) M Navrátilová	6	7

=== Bottom half ===
First round
(Mexico) Gina Díaz-Ponce
(Sudan) M Senoussi	w/o
(Romania) Virginia Ruzici	6	6
(Jamaica) JA Rowe	2	1
(Brazil) Andréa Menezes	5	6	6
(South Korea) Lee Mi-ok	7	0	4
(Australia) Dianne Fromholtz	6	6
(France) Brigitte Simon	1	3
(Poland) Małgorzata Rejdych	0	2
(United States) Ann Kiyomura	6	6

Second round
(Mexico) G Díaz-Ponce	4	0
(Romania) V Ruzici	6	6
(Brazil) A Menezes	3	0
(Australia) D Fromholtz	6	6
(United States) A Kiyomura	6	0
(Belgium) L Tibax	0	0^{r}
(United Kingdom) Sue Barker	7	6
(Spain) Mónica Álvarez de Mon	5	1

Quarterfinals
(Romania) V Ruzici	3	4
(Australia) D Fromholtz	6	6
(United States) A Kiyomura	6	6
(United Kingdom) S Barker	1	2

Semifinals
(Australia) D Fromholtz	7	3	3
(United States) A Kiyomura	5	6	6
