= Phil Siviter =

British tennis player (born 1953)

- Full name: Philip Siviter
- Country (sports): Great Britain
- Born: 16 March 1953 (age 72)

Singles
- Career record: 3–5

Grand Slam singles results
- Wimbledon: 1R (1973)

Doubles
- Career record: 1–4

Grand Slam doubles results
- Wimbledon: 1R (1973)

Philip Siviter (born 16 March 1953) is a British former professional tennis player.

Siviter, a Worcestershire county player, featured in the men's singles and doubles main draws at the 1973 Wimbledon Championships. Although he didn't play much on tour thereafter due to business commitments, he managed a win over world number 80 Colin Dowdeswell at a 1983 closed tournament in Telford. He has competed with success on the ITF senior's circuit, winning the Over-45s doubles world championships.
