= Tony Parun =

New Zealand tennis player

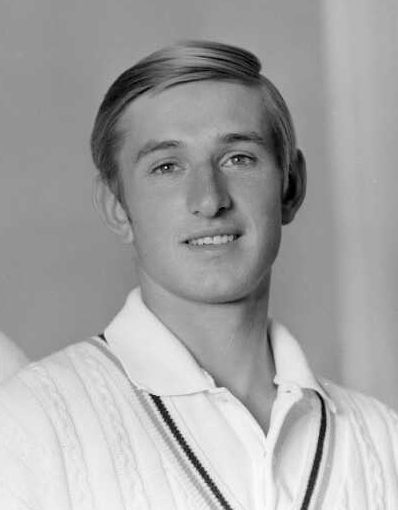
- Country (sports): New Zealand
- Born: 24 August 1949 (age 77)
- Plays: Right-handed

Singles
- Career record: 2–14
- Career titles: 0
- Highest ranking: No. 235 (8 April 1975)

Grand Slam singles results
- Wimbledon: 1R (1973)

Doubles
- Career record: 2–7

Grand Slam doubles results
- Wimbledon: 1R (1975)

Tony Parun (born 24 August 1949) is a former professional tennis player from New Zealand.

== Playing career ==
His brother, Onny Parun, was also a professional tennis player and they both represented New Zealand in the Davis Cup during the 1970s.

Parun qualified for the main draw of the 1973 Wimbledon Championships, where he lost to Mike Machette 6–3, 4–6, 3–6, 1–6.

Parun has two sons, Anthony and Bernhard, who both played tennis for Germany.

== Personal life ==
In 2023, his younger brother Melvin Joseph Parun was killed in the Loafers Lodge fire.
