= Colin McHugo =

British tennis player

- Country (sports): Great Britain
- Born: 4 December 1945 (age 79)

Singles

Grand Slam singles results
- French Open: Q2 (1970)
- Wimbledon: 1R (1973)

Doubles

Grand Slam doubles results
- Wimbledon: 1R (1973)

Grand Slam mixed doubles results
- Wimbledon: 4R (1969)

Colin McHugo (born 4 December 1945) is a British former professional tennis player.

McHugo, raised in London, was a Surrey county representative and made several appearance at Wimbledon during the 1960s and 1970s. He reached the mixed doubles fourth round partnering Wendy Hall in 1969.
