= Greg Braun =

Australian tennis player

- Country (sports): Australia

Singles
- Career record: 2–17
- Highest ranking: No. 269 (12 July 1978)

Grand Slam singles results
- Australian Open: 1R (1975, 1976)
- Wimbledon: 1R (1973)

Grand Slam doubles results
- Australian Open: 2R (1974)
- Wimbledon: 1R (1973)

Grand Slam mixed doubles results
- Wimbledon: 2R (1974)

Greg Braun is an Australian former professional tennis player.

Braun grew up on a central Queensland cattle farm and was active on the professional tour in the 1970s. During his career he twice featured in the singles main draw of the Australian Open, which included a first round loss to the top seeded Ken Rosewall in the 1976 tournament. He also played in the main draw at Wimbledon in 1973.

== ATP Challenger finals ==
=== Doubles: 2 (0–2) ===
Result	No.	Date	Tournament	Surface	Partner	Opponents	Score
Loss	1.	Jan 1978	Hobart, Australia	Hard	(Australia) Peter Campbell	(Australia) Chris Kachel (Australia) John Marks	1–6, 4–6
Loss	2.	Jul 1978	Hilton Head, U.S.	Clay	(Australia) Paul Kronk	(South Africa) Kevin Curren (United States) Peter Rennert	3–6, 6–4, 2–6
