= 1973 Wimbledon Championships – Boys' singles =

Boys' singles
- 1973 Wimbledon Championships

Final
- Champion: (United States) Billy Martin
- Runner-up: (Rhodesia) Colin Dowdeswell
- Score: 6–2, 6–4

Events
| Singles | men | women | | boys | girls |
| Doubles | men | women | mixed | boys | girls |
| ← 1972 · | Wimbledon Championships | · 1974 → |

Billy Martin defeated Colin Dowdeswell in the final, 6–2, 6–4 to win the boys' singles tennis title at the 1973 Wimbledon Championships.

== Draw ==
=== Key ===
- Q = Qualifier
- WC = Wild card
- LL = Lucky loser
- Alt = Alternate
- SE = Special exempt
- PR = Protected ranking
- ITF = ITF entry
- JE = Junior exempt
- w/o = Walkover
- r = Retired
- d = Defaulted
- SR = Special ranking

=== Finals ===
Semifinals
(United States) Billy Martin | 6 | 7
(Czechoslovakia) Ivan Jankovský | 1 | 5
(Rhodesia) Colin Dowdeswell | 6 | 6
(Paraguay) Víctor Pecci | 1 | 1

Final
(United States) Billy Martin | 6 | 6
(Rhodesia) Colin Dowdeswell | 2 | 4

=== Top half ===
First round
(Iran) Mansour Bahrami | 0 | 0
(United States) Billy Martin | 6 | 6
(Norway) JM Soegaard | 1 | 2
(Israel) Yair Wertheimer | 6 | 6
(Switzerland) Heinz Günthardt | 6 | 6
(South Korea) HS Chang | 3 | 4
(Belgium) A Bossuyt | 1 | 1
(Soviet Union) Konstantin Pugaev | 6 | 6
(Chile) Hans Gildemeister | w/o
(France) Christophe Casa
(Sudan) AF Toubia | w/o
(Czechoslovakia) Ivan Jankovský
(Sweden) Olle Palmer | 6 | 6
(Republic of Ireland) Sean Sorensen | 3 | 2

Second round
(Spain) J García | 2 | 2
(United States) W Martin | 6 | 6
(Israel) Y Wertheimer | 6 | 6
(Switzerland) H Günthardt | 2 | 4
(Soviet Union) K Pugaev | 7 | 2 | 3
(France) C Casa | 5 | 6 | 6
(Czechoslovakia) I Jankovský | 4 | 6 | 6
(Sweden) O Palmer | 6 | 3 | 2

Quarterfinals
(United States) W Martin | 6 | 6
(Israel) Y Wertheimer | 2 | 4
(France) C Casa | 3 | 4
(Czechoslovakia) I Jankovský | 6 | 6

Semifinals
(United States) W Martin | 6 | 7
(Czechoslovakia) I Jankovský | 1 | 5

=== Bottom half ===
First round
(Australia) Chris Kachel | 6 | 6
(Poland) J Jasiński | 1 | 1
(Rhodesia) Colin Dowdeswell | 6 | 6
(Socialist Federal Republic of Yugoslavia) Zoltan Ilin | 3 | 4
(Austria) Hans-Peter Kandler | 6 | 1 | 6
(Lebanon) R Haddad | 4 | 6 | 2
(New Zealand) JG Slater | 5 | 9 | 6
(United Kingdom) Jonathan Smith | 7 | 8 | 8
(Denmark) F Christensen | 1 | 3
(Paraguay) Víctor Pecci | 6 | 6
(Brazil) F Arenson | 4 | 6
(West Germany) Rolf Gehring | 6 | 8
(India) Ashok Amritraj | 6 | 6
(Netherlands) Theo Gorter | 4 | 4

Second round
(Australia) C Kachel | 3 | 4
(Rhodesia) C Dowdeswell | 6 | 6
(Austria) H-P Kandler | 5 | 2
(United Kingdom) J Smith | 7 | 6
(Paraguay) V Pecci | 6 | 9
(West Germany) R Gehring | 3 | 8
(India) A Amritraj | 6 | 6
(Finland) T Serenius | 1 | 1

Quarterfinals
(Rhodesia) C Dowdeswell | 6 | 6
(United Kingdom) J Smith | 1 | 2
(Paraguay) V Pecci | 3 | 6 | 6
(India) A Amritraj | 6 | 3 | 2

Semifinals
(Rhodesia) C Dowdeswell | 6 | 6
(Paraguay) V Pecci | 1 | 1
