= Robert Stock (tennis) =

American tennis player (born 1944)

- Country (sports): United States
- Born: October 15, 1944 (age 81)

Singles
- Career record: 1–10

Grand Slam singles results
- French Open: Q2 (1971, 1972)
- Wimbledon: 1R (1972, 1973)
- US Open: 1R (1967)

Robert Stock (born October 15, 1944), also known as Bob Stock, is an American former professional tennis player.

Raised in Iowa, Stock played collegiate tennis for the UCLA Bruins, where he was a teammate of Arthur Ashe. While in college he was drafted into the Marines and served an 11-month tour of Vietnam in 1969. He competed on the professional tour in the early 1970s and qualified twice for the main draw at the Wimbledon Championships.
