= Marcelo Lara =

Mexican tennis player

- Country (sports): Mexico
- Born: October 5, 1947 (age 79) Mexico City, Mexico
- Plays: Right-handed

Singles
- Career record: 65–111
- Career titles: 0
- Highest ranking: No. 59 (6 November 1974)

Grand Slam singles results
- Australian Open: 2R (1974)
- French Open: 2R (1973)
- Wimbledon: 2R (1973)
- US Open: 4R (1967)

Doubles
- Career record: 78–82
- Career titles: 3
- Highest ranking: No. 63 (3 January 1979)

Grand Slam doubles results
- French Open: 2R (1974, 1975)
- Wimbledon: 1R (1973, 1975
- US Open: 3R (1968)

Marcelo Lara (born October 5, 1947) is a former professional tennis player from Mexico. He enjoyed most of his tennis success while playing doubles. During his career, he won three doubles titles. He was a runner-up in the mixed doubles event at the 1973 French Open partnering compatriot Rosie Reyes.

== Grand Slam finals ==
=== Mixed doubles (1 runner-up) ===
Result	Year	Championship	Surface	Partner	Opponents	Score
Loss	1974	French Open	Clay	(Mexico) Rosie Reyes	(Czechoslovakia) Martina Navratilova (Colombia) Iván Molina	3–6, 3–6

== Career finals ==
=== Doubles: 10 (3 titles / 7 runner-ups) ===
Result	W–L	Date	Tournament	Surface	Partner	Opponents	Score
Loss	0–1	Oct 1972	Tokyo Outdoor, Japan	Hard	(New Zealand) Jeff Simpson	(United States) Dick Dell (United States) Sherwood Stewart	3–6, 2–6
Win	1–1	Oct 1973	Manila, Philippines	Hard	(United States) Sherwood Stewart	(West Germany) Jürgen Fassbender (West Germany) Hans-Jürgen Pohmann	6–2, 6–0
Loss	1–2	Nov 1974	Manila, Philippines	Hard	(United States) Mike Estep	(Australia) Syd Ball (Australia) Ross Case	3–6, 6–7
Win	2–2	Feb 1975	Little Rock, U.S.	Carpet	(Australia) Barry Phillips-Moore	(United States) Jeff Austin (United States) Charles Owens	6–4, 6–3
Win	3–2	May 1975	Nice, France	Clay	(Mexico) Joaquín Loyo-Mayo	(Colombia) Iván Molina (Colombia) Jairo Velasco Sr.	7–6, 6–7, 8–6
Loss	3–3	Aug 1975	Cincinnati, U.S.	Hard	(Mexico) Joaquín Loyo-Mayo	(Australia) Phil Dent (South Africa) Cliff Drysdale	6–7, 4–6
Loss	3–4	Dec 1977	Bombay, India	Clay	(India) Jasjit Singh	(United States) Mike Cahill (United States) Terry Moor	7–6, 4–6, 4–6
Loss	3–5	Feb 1978	Mexico City WCT, Mexico	Hard	(Mexico) Raúl Ramírez	(United States) Gene Mayer (India) Sashi Menon	3–6, 6–7
Loss	3–6	Aug 1978	Columbus, U.S.	Clay	(United States) Eliot Teltscher	(Australia) Colin Dibley (Australia) Bob Giltinan	2–6, 3–6
Loss	3–7	Aug 1978	Atlanta, U.S.	Hard	(United States) Mike Cahill	(Australia) John Alexander (United States) Butch Walts	6–3, 4–6, 6–7
