= Steve Messmer =

American tennis player

- Full name: Stephen George Messmer
- Country (sports): United States
- Born: Indianapolis, Indiana
- Died: 2017 (aged 68)

Singles
- Career record: 0–3
- Highest ranking: No. 282 (Sep 27, 1974)

Grand Slam singles results
- Wimbledon: 1R (1973)
- US Open: 1R (1974)

Grand Slam mixed doubles results
- Wimbledon: 2R (1973)
- US Open: 1R (1974)

Stephen George Messmer (died 2017) was an American professional tennis player.

Indianapolis-born, Messmer grew up in Glendale, California and was a collegiate tennis player for Cal State Northridge, at the time known as San Fernando Valley State. He was the 1969 NCAA College Division singles and doubles champion. In 1973 he qualified for the singles main draw at Wimbledon and was runner-up in the All England Plate. He also featured in the 1974 US Open main draw, losing his first round match in four sets to Fred McNair.
