= Nicolas Kelaidis =

Greek tennis player

Nick Kelaidis
- Full name: Nicolas Kelaidis
- Country (sports): Greece
- Born: 29 October 1949 (age 75); Alexandria, Egypt
- Height: 178 cm (5 ft 10 in)

Singles
- Career record: 2–15
- Highest ranking: No. 244 (27 September 1974)

Grand Slam singles results
- Australian Open: 1R (1973)
- French Open: 1R (1973)
- Wimbledon: Q2 (1974, 1976)

Doubles
- Career record: 1–19

Grand Slam doubles results
- Australian Open: 1R (1973, 1977)
- French Open: 1R (1973)
- Wimbledon: 1R (1973, 1975)

Nicolas Kelaidis (born 29 October 1949) is a Greek former professional tennis player.

== Biography ==
Kelaidis was born in the Egyptian city of Alexandria, which had a large Greek population at the time. He played college tennis in the United States, at Clemson University from 1968 to 1971.

During the 1970s, Kelaidis competed on the professional tennis circuit and was a regular member of the Greece Davis Cup team, featuring in a total of 10 ties. He appeared in the main draws of the Australian Open, French Open and Wimbledon.

For most of the 1980s he was a coach for the Swiss Tennis Federation, then spent a decade coaching for the French Federation, with his roles at both focusing on women's tennis. He married Swiss tennis player Lilian Drescher.
