= Greg Perkins =

Australian tennis player

- Full name: Greg Perkins
- Country (sports): Australia

Singles

Grand Slam singles results
- Australian Open: 1R (1972, 1973, 1975)
- French Open: 1R (1970)
- Wimbledon: 3R (1973)

Doubles

Grand Slam doubles results
- Australian Open: QF (1972)
- Wimbledon: 1R (1971, 1972, 1973)

Greg Perkins is a former professional tennis player from Australia.

== Biography ==
Perkins is originally from Brisbane but moved to Sydney at the beginning of his career.

As a junior he partnered with Allan McDonald to win the boys' doubles title at the 1970 Australian Open.

In the early 1970s he competed in the professional tour. He was a quarter-finalist in the men's doubles at the 1972 Australian Open partnering Bob Giltinan and made the third round of the singles at the 1973 Wimbledon Championships.
