= Bob Rheinberger =

Australian tennis player

- Full name: Robert Rheinberger
- Country (sports): Australia
- Born: 18 November 1945 (age 79)

Singles
- Career record: 4–31
- Highest ranking: No. 162 (April 30, 1975)

Grand Slam singles results
- Australian Open: 1R (1976)
- French Open: 1R (1970, 1975)

Doubles
- Career record: 3–16

Grand Slam doubles results
- French Open: 1R (1972)

Robert Rheinberger (born 18 November 1945) is an Australian former professional tennis player.

Rheinberger comes from a tennis playing family in the New South Wales town of Bega and competed on the professional tour in the 1970s. During his career he featured in the main draw of the French Open on multiple occasions. He was based out of Spain and later coached in West Germany.
