= Dan Bleckinger =

American tennis player

- Country (sports): United States
- Born: 27 May 1947 (age 79)

Singles
- Career record: 9–21

Grand Slam singles results
- French Open: Q3 (1972)
- Wimbledon: 3R (1972)
- US Open: 2R (1968)

Doubles
- Career record: 3–7

Grand Slam doubles results
- Wimbledon: 3R (1973)

Dan Bleckinger (born May 27, 1947) is an American former professional tennis player.

Bleckinger, raised in Oshkosh, Wisconsin, played collegiate tennis for both the University of Wisconsin and the University of Utah. A Big 10 singles champion in his freshman season at Wisconsin, Bleckinger spent his final two years with Utah, earning All-American honors in 1969 and 1970. He reached the singles third round of the 1972 Wimbledon Championships as a qualifier and was eliminated by the fifth-seeded Jan Kodeš.
