= Piero Toci =

Italian tennis player

- Country (sports): Italy
- Born: 29 June 1949 (age 75); Marliana, Italy

Singles
- Career record: 10–26
- Highest ranking: No. 175 (23 August 1973)

Grand Slam singles results
- Australian Open: 2R (1969)
- French Open: 2R (1969)
- Wimbledon: Q1 (1971, 1972, 1973)

Doubles
- Career record: 7–20

Grand Slam doubles results
- Australian Open: 1R (1969)
- French Open: 2R (1971)
- Wimbledon: 2R (1973)

Piero Toci (born 29 June 1949) is an Italian former professional tennis player.

Toci, who comes from Tuscany, was an Italian under 16s singles champion.

While competing on the international tour he had one of his best results in 1968 when he beat Manuel Orantes at the South Australian Championships, saving a match point en route. He made the second round of the 1969 Australian Open, with a five-set win over Giuseppe Merlo.
