= Yugoslav Tennis Association =

TSJ logo

Yugoslav Tennis Association (Serbo-Croatian: Teniski Savez Jugoslavije, Тениски Савез Југославије; Slovene: Teniska zveza Jugoslavije; Macedonian: Тениска Федерација на Југославија, Teniska Federacija na Jugoslavija) was the governing body of tennis in Yugoslavia.

The association was formed in Zagreb in 1922 and its first president was Croat Hinko Wurth.

== Successors ==
- Tennis Association of Bosnia and Herzegovina
- Croatian Tennis Association
- Tennis Federation of Serbia
