= John Feaver =

British tennis player

- Country (sports): United Kingdom
- Residence: Wimbledon, London
- Born: 16 February 1952 (age 74) Fleet, Hampshire
- Height: 6 ft 3 in (1.91 m)
- Plays: Right-handed (one-handed backhand)

Singles
- Career record: 67–167
- Career titles: 0
- Highest ranking: No. 91 (3 October 1977)

Grand Slam singles results
- Australian Open: 2R (1974)
- French Open: 1R (1974, 1975, 1976, 1977, 1978, 1982, 1983)
- Wimbledon: 4R (1973)
- US Open: 4R (1977)

Doubles
- Career record: 126–171
- Career titles: 1
- Highest ranking: No. 69 (12 December 1976)

Grand Slam doubles results
- Australian Open: 2R (1974, 1977^{Jan})
- French Open: SF (1982)
- Wimbledon: QF (1981)
- US Open: 3R (1977)

Grand Slam mixed doubles results
- Wimbledon: QF (1981)

John Feaver (born 16 February 1952) is a former professional tennis player from the United Kingdom.

== Career ==
Feaver attended Millfield School in Somerset, which produced a number of male tennis players from the 1950s to the 1970s, including Mark Cox and Paul Hutchins. He turned professional in 1971, and enjoyed most of his tennis success while playing doubles. During his career he reached 10 doubles finals, achieving a career-high doubles ranking of 69, and was a semi-finalist in the men's doubles at the French Open in 1982. Feaver's highest singles ranking was 91, which he reached in 1977 after making it to the fourth round of the US Open and competing in his only singles final at the Florence Open (where he was defeated by the reigning champion Paolo Bertolucci in straight sets). His best results were on grass and clay courts, achieving more wins on the latter than on any other surface.

For over 20 years (1976 to 1997), Feaver held the record for serving the most aces in a single Wimbledon match, 42, achieved against John Newcombe. He represented Great Britain in the Davis Cup between 1977 and 1983. He also achieved the remarkable distinction of beating five-times Wimbledon champion Bjorn Borg twice in a week at the Beckenham grass court exhibition tournament in the mid-1970s.

== Personal life ==
Feaver married South African Alison Braatvedt and has two children Lucinda and James, who is also a tennis player.

John enjoyed a successful career in sport and business after his tennis days, and now lives between Wimbledon and Somerset. He is an accomplished golfer and cricketer and works closely with sports agencies and charities StreetGames and Performance Plus Sport.

== Grand Prix and WCT finals ==
=== Singles: 1 (1 loss) ===
Result	W-L	Date	Tournament	Surface	Opponent	Score
Loss	0–1	Apr 1977	Florence, Italy	Clay	(Italy) Paolo Bertolucci	4–6, 1–6, 5–7

=== Doubles: 10 (1 win / 9 losses) ===
Result	W-L	Date	Tournament	Surface	Partner	Opponents	Score
Loss	0–1	Mar 1974	Jackson, U.S.	Carpet	(South Africa) Byron Bertram	(United States) Fred McNair (United States) Grover Raz Reid	6–3, 3–6, 3–6
Loss	0–2	Jul 1975	Istanbul, Turkey	Carpet	(Rhodesia) Colin Dowdeswell	(Australia) Colin Dibley (Brazil) Thomaz Koch	2–6, 2–6, 2–6
Loss	0–3	Nov 1976	London, England	Carpet	(Australia) John James	(United Kingdom) David Lloyd (United Kingdom) John Lloyd	4–6, 6–3, 2–6
Loss	0–4	Oct 1977	Basel, Switzerland	Carpet	(Australia) John James	(United Kingdom) Mark Cox (United Kingdom) Buster Mottram	5–7, 4–6, 3–6
Loss	0–5	Sep 1979	Palermo, Italy	Clay	(Egypt) Ismail El Shafei	(Australia) Peter McNamara (Australia) Paul McNamee	5–7, 6–7
Loss	0–6	Sep 1979	Madrid, Spain	Clay	(United Kingdom) Robin Drysdale	(Brazil) Carlos Kirmayr (Brazil) Cássio Motta	6–7, 4–6
Loss	0–7	Jul 1980	Båstad, Sweden	Clay	(Australia) Peter McNamara	(Switzerland) Heinz Günthardt (Switzerland) Markus Günthardt	4–6, 4–6
Win	1–7	Sep 1980	Bordeaux, France	Clay	(France) Gilles Moretton	(Italy) Gianni Ocleppo (Ecuador) Ricardo Ycaza	6–3, 6–2
Loss	1–8	Mar 1981	Nancy, France	Hard (i)	(Czechoslovakia) Jiří Hřebec	(Romania) Ilie Năstase (Italy) Adriano Panatta	4–6, 6–2, 4–6
Loss	1–9	Oct 1981	Tel Aviv, Israel	Hard	(United States) Steve Krulevitz	(United States) Steve Meister (United States) Van Winitsky	6–3, 3–6, 3–6
