= Chiradip Mukerjea =

Indian tennis player (born 1953)

- Country (sports): India
- Born: 14 August 1953 (age 72) Calcutta, India

Singles
- Career record: 5–7

Grand Slam singles results
- Wimbledon: 2R (1973, 1975)

Doubles
- Career record: 4–9

Grand Slam doubles results
- Wimbledon: 1R (1973, 1977)

Chiradip "Chiro" Mukerjea (born 14 August 1953) is an Indian former professional tennis player.

== Biography ==
Born in Calcutta, Mukerjea played on the professional tour in the 1970s. He was unbeaten during his Davis Cup career for India, winning three singles and one doubles rubber.

Mukerjea's first Davis Cup appearance came in India's 4–0 win over Pakistan in 1973, where he played a dead rubber reverse singles against Saeed Meer which was abandoned after one set. He next played in 1976, featuring in ties against Thailand and the Philippines. In the tie against Thailand he was again called up for a dead rubber reverse singles and beat Somparn Champisri in straight sets. He was used more in the subsequent tie against the Philippines and won both of his singles rubbers in five sets, as well as the doubles rubber, with Sashi Menon.

Mukerjea reached the second round in both of his Wimbledon singles main draw appearances, which included a win over Wojciech Fibak in 1975. He was a doubles finalist at the 1976 Indian Open and won a doubles bronze medal at the 1978 Asian Games in Bangkok.

== Grand Prix career finals ==
=== Doubles: 1 (0–1) ===
Result	W-L	Date	Tournament	Surface	Partner	Opponents	Score
Loss	0–1	Nov 1976	Bangalore, India	Clay	(India) Bhanu Nunna	(Australia) Bob Carmichael (Australia) Ray Ruffels	2–6, 6–7

== See also ==
- List of India Davis Cup team representatives
