= Pietro Marzano =

Italian tennis player

- Country (sports): Italy
- Born: 29 August 1949 (age 75)
- Plays: Right-handed

Singles
- Career titles: 0
- Highest ranking: No. 252 (15 December 1975)

Grand Slam singles results
- Australian Open: 2R (1969)
- French Open: 3R (1969)
- Wimbledon: 2R (1973)

Doubles
- Career titles: 0

Grand Slam doubles results
- Australian Open: 1R 1969)
- Wimbledon: 2R (1973)

Pietro Marzano (born 29 August 1949) is a former professional tennis player from Italy who was active in the 1960s and 1970s.

His best singles result at a Grand Slam tournament was reaching the third round at the French Open in 1969 in which he lost in straight sets to first-seeded and eventual champion Rod Laver. At the Australian Open earlier that year he had a walkover against Tom Okker in the first round and lost in three sets to Toomas Leius in the second. At Wimbledon he took part in the singles qualifying event in 1970, 1972 and 1973. In 1972 he qualified for the main draw but lost in the first round. Both other years he failed to qualify, however, in 1973 he was admitted to the main draw as a lucky loser. Marzano made it to the second round, after a victory against Raúl Ramírez, where he was defeated by eventual champion Jan Kodeš. In doubles he reached the second round at Wimbledon in 1973 with compatriot Nicola Pietrangeli.

Marzano was a member of the Italian Davis Cup team in 1969 and 1973 and had a 1–4 win–loss record, playing only in the doubles.

He was married to Italian tennis player Daniela Porzio.
