= Pierre Joly =

French tennis player

- Country (sports): France
- Born: 11 February 1946 (age 79)

Singles
- Career record: 3–10
- Highest ranking: No. 244 (29 Jul 1974)

Grand Slam singles results
- French Open: 1R (1968, 1970, 1971, 1973, 1974)
- Wimbledon: 1R (1973)

Doubles
- Career record: 1–6

Grand Slam doubles results
- French Open: 2R (1969, 1971, 1972)

Grand Slam mixed doubles results
- French Open: QF (1974)
- Wimbledon: 2R (1973, 1974)

Pierre Joly (born 11 February 1946) is a French former professional tennis player.

Active in the 1960s and 1970s, Joly was ranked as high as seven in France.

Joly had a career win over Guillermo Vilas (Beckenham in 1972) and was a mixed doubles quarter-finalist at the 1974 French Open, with his wife Anna-Maria Nasuelli.
