= Keith Hancock (tennis) =

Australian tennis player

- Country (sports): Australia
- Born: 3 February 1953 (age 72)

Singles
- Career record: 13–15
- Highest ranking: No. 126 (3 June 1974)

Grand Slam singles results
- Australian Open: 3R (1974)
- French Open: 1R (1974)
- Wimbledon: 2R (1973)

Doubles
- Career record: 5–6

Grand Slam doubles results
- Australian Open: 2R (1974, 1976)
- Wimbledon: 3R (1973, 1978)

Keith Hancock (born 3 February 1953) is an Australian former professional tennis player.

Active in the 1970s, Hancock comes from the New South Wales outback settlement of Mount Brown, where his parents were the only inhabitants. They operated the tick quarantine gate for cattle crossing the Queensland border.

Hancock, as a lucky loser from qualifying, made the round of 16 at the 1974 Australian Open and his run included a win over the 11th-seeded Geoff Masters. He lost a close round of 16 match to Colin Dibley, 6–8 in the fifth set.
