= Allan McDonald (tennis) =

Australian tennis player

- Full name: Allan J. McDonald
- Country (sports): Australia
- Born: 1 March 1951 (age 74); Sydney, Australia

Singles

Grand Slam singles results
- Australian Open: 2R (1972)
- French Open: P2 (1972)
- Wimbledon: 2R (1972, 1973)

Doubles

Grand Slam doubles results
- Australian Open: 2R (1973)
- Wimbledon: 2R (1971, 1973)

Allan McDonald (born 1 March 1951) is a former professional tennis player from Australia.

== Biography ==
McDonald, a Sydney born player, represented the Australian Junior Davis Cup team in the late 1960s. He won the boys' singles title at the 1969 Australian Open and partnered with Greg Perkins to win the boys' doubles event at the 1970 Australian Open.

On the men's circuit he competed until 1975 but was unable to replicate his junior success. His best performance in a grand slam tournament came at the 1971 Wimbledon Championships, where he made the round of 16 in the mixed doubles, partnering Patti Hogan.

He now runs a tennis school in the NSW Central Coast town of Toukley.
