= Dick R. Bohrnstedt =

American tennis player

- Full name: Richard Lawrence Bohrnstedt
- Country (sports): United States
- Born: 28 April 1950 (age 75); Redlands, California, US
- Plays: Right-handed

Singles
- Career record: 34-67
- Career titles: 0
- Highest ranking: No. 98 (1977)

Grand Slam singles results
- Australian Open: 3R (1977^{Dec})
- French Open: 1R (1977)
- Wimbledon: 2R (1977)
- US Open: 1R (1974,1976,1977)

Doubles
- Career record: 23-55
- Career titles: 0

Grand Slam doubles results
- Australian Open: 2R (1977^{Jan})
- French Open: 2R (1970)
- Wimbledon: 3R (1973, 1977)
- US Open: 2R (1976, 1977)

Dick R. Bohrnstedt (born April 28, 1950) is an American former professional tennis player who played from 1972-1979. He was a 2-time CIF singles champion from Redlands High School (1967,68), and 2-time All-American at USC (1971,72). In 1973, on the ATP tour, he reached the quarterfinals of the Welsh Open on grass, and the semifinals of the U.S. National Hardcourts in Aptos, CA, defeating 1973 U.S. Open men's singles runner-up, world #5 Jan Kodeš, 6-4, 6-3. In 1974 indoor tournaments he reached the quarterfinals of the Canadian Indoor after defeating Vitas Gerulaitis, the quarterfinals in the Arkansas International, and the semifinals in Salt Lake City.

He reached a career-high ranking of world No. 98 in 1977. Altogether he played 101 singles matches at the highest level and 78 doubles matches. His brother David Bohrnstedt played tennis for Southern Methodist University.

== Tennis career ==
Dick R. Bohrnstedt's most notable tennis achievement is his run in the December version of the 1977 Australian Open, where he won two matches and reached the third round, He upset Onny Parun of New Zealand in the first round, 6-2, 6-4, 6-7, 6-4, followed by John James of Australia, by an identical score. His run came to an end when he faced Vitas Gerulaitis of the United States, losing in straight sets.

In doubles he had his best result in 1973, and in 1977, playing at Wimbledon reaching the 3rd round both times. His closest chance at a Quarterfinal came in 1973 when he was partnered with William Brown of the United States.

In the first round, he and Brown defeated Guy Fritz of the United States and Harry Fritz of Canada in straight sets.

In the second round, he and Brown defeated Luis Baraldi of Mexico and Eduardo Zuleta of Ecuador, again in straight sets.

Finally, they played David Lloyd and John Paish, both of the United Kingdom. In a very tight match, they lost 6-8, 6-4, 9-8, 4-6, 4-6; dropping both final sets denied them a quarterfinals berth.

In 1977, he partnered with Mike Machette. In the first round, they defeated Pat Dupre, and Steve Krulevitz, both of the United States in straight sets.

Bohrnstedt and Machette went on to upset Vijay and Anand Amritraj of India in the second round. 1-6, 6-3, 9-8, 6-3.

Finally, they played Wojtek Fibak of Poland and Dick Stockton of the United States. Here they lost their quarterfinals bid, 2-6, 6-8, 6-3, 3-6.
