= Ionel Sânteiu =

Romanian tennis player (born 1948)

Ionel Santeiu
- Country (sports): Romania
- Born: 6 March 1948 (age 78)

Singles
- Career record: 6–17
- Highest ranking: No. 272 (14 June 1976)

Grand Slam singles results
- French Open: 1R (1975)
- Wimbledon: 1R (1973)

Doubles
- Career record: 6–16
- Highest ranking: No. 236 (12 December 1976)

Grand Slam doubles results
- French Open: 1R (1972, 1975, 1976)

Ionel Santeiu (born 6 March 1948) is a Romanian former tennis player. His highest ATP ranking was number 272 achieved on 14 June 1976.
