= 1973 Wimbledon Championships =

- Date: 25 June – 8 July
- Edition: 87th
- Category: Grand Slam
- Draw: 128S / 64D / 128X
- Prize money: £52,400
- Surface: Grass
- Location: Church Road; SW19, Wimbledon, London, United Kingdom
- Venue: All England Lawn Tennis and Croquet Club

Champions

Men's singles
- (Czechoslovakia) Jan Kodeš

Women's singles
- (United States) Billie Jean King

Men's doubles
- (United States) Jimmy Connors / (Romania) Ilie Năstase

Women's doubles
- (United States) Rosie Casals / (United States) Billie Jean King

Mixed doubles
- (Australia) Owen Davidson / (United States) Billie Jean King

Boys' singles
- (United States) Billy Martin

Girls' singles
- (United States) Ann Kiyomura
← 1972 ·	Wimbledon Championships	· 1974 →

The 1973 Wimbledon Championships was a tennis tournament that took place on the outdoor grass courts at the All England Lawn Tennis and Croquet Club in Wimbledon, London, United Kingdom. The tournament was scheduled to be held from Monday 25 June until Saturday 7 July 1973 but rain on the final Friday meant that the women's singles final was postponed until Saturday and the mixed doubles final was rescheduled to Sunday 8 July. It was the 87th staging of the Wimbledon Championships, and the third Grand Slam tennis event of 1973. Jan Kodeš and Billie Jean King won the singles titles. King became the first player in the open era to claim the triple crown, the second time in her career she won all three titles open to women players. Her three victories necessitated playing six matches on the final weekend of the tournament: The singles final, the doubles semi-final and final and the mixed doubles quarter-final, semi-final and final, which was played on the extended Sunday schedule.

== ATP boycott ==
In May 1973 Nikola Pilić, Yugoslavia's number one tennis player, was suspended by his national lawn tennis association, the Yugoslav Tennis Association, which claimed he had refused to play in a Davis Cup tie for his country against New Zealand earlier that month. The initial suspension of nine months, supported by the International Lawn Tennis Federation (ILTF), later was reduced by the ILTF to one month, which meant that Pilić would not be permitted to play at Wimbledon. The recently formed men's players union, the Association of Tennis Professionals (ATP), stated that none should compete if Pilić were not allowed to compete. As a result, 81 of the top players, including reigning champion Stan Smith, boycotted Wimbledon in 1973 to protest the suspension of Nikola Pilić. Twelve of the 16 men's seeds had withdrawn. This resulted in a large number of qualifiers and lucky losers.

Three ATP players, Ilie Năstase, Roger Taylor and Ray Keldie, defied the boycott and were fined by the ATP's disciplinary committee. Năstase unsuccessfully appealed the fine as he insisted that as a serving captain, he was under orders from the Romanian army and government to compete. Some contemporary press speculation and later biographies have suggested Năstase contrived to lose his fourth round match as he supported the ATP boycott, but to have lost any earlier to a considerably less able player would have been too obvious. Năstase never has commented on this speculation. Despite the boycott, the attendance of 300,172 was the second highest in the championships' history to that date.

== Prize money ==
The total prize money for 1973 championships was £52,400. The winner of the men's title earned £5,000 while the women's singles champion earned £3,000.

Event	W	F	SF	QF	Round of 16	Round of 32	Round of 64	Round of 128
Men's singles	£5,000	£3,000	£1,000	£550	£300	£200	£125	£100
Women's singles	£3,000	£2,000	£700	£400	£250	£150	£100	£75
Men's doubles *	£1,000	£600	£400	£200	£0	£0	£0	—
Women's doubles *	£600	£400	£200	£100	£0	£0	£0	—
Mixed doubles *	£500	£350	£175	£100	£0	£0	£0	£0

_{* per team}

== Champions ==
=== Seniors ===
==== Men's singles ====
(Czechoslovakia) Jan Kodeš defeated (Soviet Union) Alex Metreveli, 6–1, 9–8^{(7–5)}, 6–3

==== Women's singles ====
(United States) Billie Jean King defeated (United States) Chris Evert, 6–0, 7–5

- It was King's 10th career Grand Slam title (her 6th in the Open Era), and her 5th Wimbledon title.

==== Men's doubles ====
(United States) Jimmy Connors / (Romania) Ilie Năstase defeated (Australia) John Cooper / (Australia) Neale Fraser, 3–6, 6–3, 6–4, 8–9^{(3–7)}, 6–1

==== Women's doubles ====
(United States) Rosemary Casals / (United States) Billie Jean King defeated (France) Françoise Dürr / (Netherlands) Betty Stöve, 6–1, 4–6, 7–5

==== Mixed doubles ====
(Australia) Owen Davidson / (United States) Billie Jean King defeated (Mexico) Raúl Ramírez / (United States) Janet Newberry, 6–3, 6–2

- King became the only player to win the 'triple crown' (Singles, Doubles & Mixed Doubles) twice in the post-war era, repeating her success of 1967.

=== Juniors ===
==== Boys' singles ====
(United States) Billy Martin defeated (Rhodesia) Colin Dowdeswell, 6–2, 6–4

==== Girls' singles ====
(United States) Ann Kiyomura defeated (Czechoslovakia) Martina Navrátilová, 6–4, 7–5

== Singles seeds ==
=== Men's singles ===
1. (Romania) Ilie Năstase (fourth round, lost to Sandy Mayer)
2. (Czechoslovakia) Jan Kodeš (champion)
3. (United Kingdom) Roger Taylor (semifinals, lost to Jan Kodeš)
4. (Soviet Union) Alex Metreveli (final, lost to Jan Kodeš)
5. (United States) Jimmy Connors (quarterfinals, lost to Alex Metreveli)
6. (Sweden) Björn Borg (quarterfinals, lost to Roger Taylor)
7. (Australia) Owen Davidson (fourth round, lost to Vijay Amritraj)
8. (West Germany) Jürgen Fassbender (quarterfinals, lost to Sandy Mayer)

The original seeding list before the boycott was:

1. (United States) Stan Smith
2. (Romania) Ilie Năstase
3. (Australia) John Newcombe
4. (United States) Arthur Ashe
5. (Australia) Ken Rosewall
6. (Netherlands) Tom Okker
7. (United States) Marty Riessen
8. (Australia) Roy Emerson
9. (United States) Tom Gorman
10. (United States) Cliff Richey
11. (Italy) Adriano Panatta
12. (Spain) Manuel Orantes
13. (Soviet Union) Alex Metreveli
14. (United States) Bob Lutz
15. (Czechoslovakia) Jan Kodeš
16. (United Kingdom) Roger Taylor

=== Women's singles ===
1. (Australia) Margaret Court (semifinals, lost to Chris Evert)
2. (United States) Billie Jean King (champion)
3. (Australia) Evonne Goolagong (semifinals, lost to Billie Jean King)
4. (United States) Chris Evert (final, lost to Billie Jean King)
5. (United States) Rosie Casals (quarterfinals, lost to Chris Evert)
6. (United Kingdom) Virginia Wade (quarterfinals, lost to Evonne Goolagong)
7. (Australia) Kerry Melville (quarterfinals, lost to Billie Jean King)
8. (Soviet Union) Olga Morozova (quarterfinals, lost to Margaret Court)

Preceded by 1973 French Open	Grand Slams	Succeeded by 1973 US Open
