= 1976 Wimbledon Championships – Mixed doubles =

Mixed doubles
- 1976 Wimbledon Championships

Final
- Champions: (Australia) Tony Roche (France) Françoise Dürr
- Runners-up: (United States) Dick Stockton (United States) Rosie Casals
- Score: 6–3, 2–6, 7–5

Details
- Draw: 64 (3 Q )
- Seeds: 4

Events
Singles	men	women		boys	girls
Doubles	men	women	mixed	boys	girls
← 1975 ·	Wimbledon Championships	· 1977 →

Marty Riessen and Margaret Court were the defending champions, but Court did not compete. Riessen partnered with Martina Navrátilová but lost in the second round to Tony Roche and Françoise Dürr.

Roche and Dürr defeated Dick Stockton and Rosie Casals in the final, 6–3, 2–6, 7–5 to win the mixed doubles tennis title at the 1976 Wimbledon Championships.

== Seeds ==
1. (United States) Sandy Mayer / (United States) Billie Jean King (second round)
2. (South Africa) Frew McMillan / (Netherlands) Betty Stöve (semifinals)
3. (United States) Marty Riessen / (Czechoslovakia) Martina Navrátilová (second round)
4. (Soviet Union) Alex Metreveli / (Soviet Union) Olga Morozova (first round)

Click on the seed number of a player to go to their draw section.

== Draw ==
=== Key ===
- Q = Qualifier
- WC = Wild card
- LL = Lucky loser
- Alt = Alternate
- SE = Special exempt
- PR = Protected ranking
- ITF = ITF entry
- JE = Junior exempt
- w/o = Walkover
- r = Retired
- d = Defaulted
- SR = Special ranking

=== Finals ===
Quarterfinals
(South Africa) Bob Hewitt (South Africa) Greer Stevens	6	8	6
(United Kingdom) David Lloyd (United Kingdom) Joyce Hume	2	9	2
(Rhodesia) Colin Dowdeswell (United States) Betsy Nagelsen	3	5
(United States) Dick Stockton (United States) Rosie Casals	6	7
(United Kingdom) Mark Farrell (United Kingdom) Lesley Charles	6	3
(Australia) Tony Roche (France) Françoise Dürr	8	6
(India) Vijay Amritraj (United States) Kathy May	1	1
2	(South Africa) Frew McMillan (Netherlands) Betty Stöve	6	6

Semifinals
(South Africa) Bob Hewitt (South Africa) Greer Stevens	3	8
(United States) Dick Stockton (United States) Rosie Casals	6	9
(Australia) Tony Roche (France) Françoise Dürr	6	6
2	(South Africa) Frew McMillan (Netherlands) Betty Stöve	3	3

Final
(United States) Dick Stockton (United States) Rosie Casals	3	6	5
(Australia) Tony Roche (France) Françoise Dürr	6	2	7

=== Top half ===
==== Section 1 ====
First round
1	(United States) A Mayer (United States) BJ King	6	6
(United Kingdom) J Feaver (Romania) V Ruzici	4	2
(United Kingdom) K Wooldridge (United Kingdom) W Wooldridge	3	1
(South Africa) R Hewitt (South Africa) G Stevens	6	6
(United Kingdom) R Drysdale (United Kingdom) L Beaven	6	6
(Australia) N Fraser (Czechoslovakia) R Tomanová	1	1
LL	(United Kingdom) S Warboys (Australia) D Evers	7	9
Q	(Australia) P McNamee (Australia) K Ruddell	5	8
(United Kingdom) J Lloyd (Romania) M Simionescu	3	4
(United Kingdom) D Lloyd (United Kingdom) J Hume	6	6
(Australia) J Marks (United Kingdom) L Blachford	4	6	6
(United Kingdom) R Lewis (United Kingdom) S Mappin	6	1	2
(United States) F McNair (United States) M Louie	6	4	6
(New Zealand) A Parun (New Zealand) J Connor	1	6	0
(Australia) N Callaghan (Australia) J Walker	4	6	6
(Australia) M Edmondson (United Kingdom) A Coe	6	3	4

Second round
1	(United States) A Mayer (United States) BJ King	7	6	2
(South Africa) R Hewitt (South Africa) G Stevens	9	3	6
(United Kingdom) R Drysdale (United Kingdom) L Beaven	2	7	4
LL	(United Kingdom) S Warboys (Australia) D Evers	6	5	6
(United Kingdom) D Lloyd (United Kingdom) J Hume	6	6
(Australia) J Marks (United Kingdom) L Blachford	3	4
(United States) F McNair (United States) M Louie	2	3
(Australia) N Callaghan (Australia) J Walker	6	6

Third round
(South Africa) R Hewitt (South Africa) G Stevens	8	6
LL	(United Kingdom) S Warboys (Australia) D Evers	6	4
(United Kingdom) D Lloyd (United Kingdom) J Hume	6	5	6
(Australia) N Callaghan (Australia) J Walker	1	7	4

Quarterfinals
(South Africa) R Hewitt (South Africa) G Stevens	6	8	6
(United Kingdom) D Lloyd (United Kingdom) J Hume	2	9	2

==== Section 2 ====
First round
4	(Soviet Union) A Metreveli (Soviet Union) O Morozova	4	6	3
(United States) G Reid (Australia) K Reid	6	3	6
(Argentina) R Cano (Uruguay) F Bonicelli	6	6
(South Africa) D Schneider (South Africa) B Cuypers	4	2
(United Kingdom) M Robinson (United Kingdom) M Tyler	w/o
(Socialist Federal Republic of Yugoslavia) N Pilić (Socialist Federal Republic of Yugoslavia) M Jaušovec
(Rhodesia) C Dowdeswell (United States) E Nagelsen	9	6
(Rhodesia) A Pattison (South Africa) D Pattison	8	4
(Australia) C Kachel (Australia) C O'Neil	6	6
(United States) J McManus (Sweden) I Bentzer	2	3
(France) J-C Barclay (Belgium) M Gurdal	6	2	3
(United States) S Stewart (United States) V Ziegenfuss	4	6	6
(United States) V Amaya (United States) C Martinez	6	3	7
(United Kingdom) R Wilson (United Kingdom) J Fayter	3	6	9
(United States) R Dell (South Africa) D Boshoff	4	1
(United States) R Stockton (United States) R Casals	6	6

Second round
(United States) G Reid (Australia) K Reid	6	6
(Argentina) R Cano (Uruguay) F Bonicelli	1	2
(United Kingdom) M Robinson (United Kingdom) M Tyler	2	2
(Rhodesia) C Dowdeswell (United States) E Nagelsen	6	6
(Australia) C Kachel (Australia) C O'Neil	7	6	4
(United States) S Stewart (United States) V Ziegenfuss	9	4	6
(United Kingdom) R Wilson (United Kingdom) J Fayter	1	4
(United States) R Stockton (United States) R Casals	6	6

Third round
(United States) G Reid (Australia) K Reid	3	5
(Rhodesia) C Dowdeswell (United States) E Nagelsen	6	7
(United States) S Stewart (United States) V Ziegenfuss	8	4
(United States) R Stockton (United States) R Casals	9	6

Quarterfinals
(Rhodesia) C Dowdeswell (United States) E Nagelsen	3	5
(United States) R Stockton (United States) R Casals	6	7

=== Bottom half ===
==== Section 3 ====
First round
(South Africa) J Yuill (South Africa) R Whitehouse	8	7
Q	(United States) J Geraghty (United States) L Antonoplis	6	5
(United States) W Martin (United States) M Michel	w/o
LL	(Japan) Y Tezuka (Japan) N Sato
(South Africa) L Sosnowski (South Africa) M Kruger	6	6
(United States) J Holladay (United States) T Holladay	4	2
(United Kingdom) M Farrell (United Kingdom) L Charles	w/o
(South Africa) P Cramer (South Africa) A McMillan
(South Africa) B Mitton (South Africa) E Vlotman	6	6
(United States) N Holmes (United States) S Mehmedbasich	2	1
(United States) E Scott (United States) L Thomas	3	4
(Romania) I Țiriac (United States) P Teeguarden	6	6
(Chile) B Prajoux (United States) P Hogan
(Australia) A Roche (France) F Dürr	w/o
(United States) C Pasarell (Australia) D Fromholtz	4	2
3	(United States) M Riessen (Czechoslovakia) M Navrátilová	6	6

Second round
(South Africa) J Yuill (South Africa) R Whitehouse	w/o
(United States) W Martin (United States) M Michel
(South Africa) L Sosnowski (South Africa) M Kruger	7	1	3
(United Kingdom) M Farrell (United Kingdom) L Charles	5	6	6
(South Africa) B Mitton (South Africa) E Vlotman
(Romania) I Țiriac (United States) P Teeguarden	w/o
(Australia) A Roche (France) F Dürr	6	6
3	(United States) M Riessen (Czechoslovakia) M Navrátilová	4	3

Third round
(South Africa) J Yuill (South Africa) R Whitehouse	4	0
(United Kingdom) M Farrell (United Kingdom) L Charles	6	6
(Romania) I Țiriac (United States) P Teeguarden	5	2
(Australia) A Roche (France) F Dürr	7	6

Quarterfinals
(United Kingdom) M Farrell (United Kingdom) L Charles	6	3
(Australia) A Roche (France) F Dürr	8	6

==== Section 4 ====
First round
(Australia) T Little (Australia) P Whytcross	w/o
(Colombia) I Molina (Colombia) I Fernández de Soto
LL	(South Africa) M Myburg (Australia) K Hallam	2	6	3
(India) V Amritraj (United States) K May	6	4	6
(Australia) G Masters (Australia) L Hunt	1	8
(Australia) P Dent (United Kingdom) V Wade	6	9
(South Africa) B Bertram (South Africa) I Kloss	6	6
(Soviet Union) V Borisov (Soviet Union) N Chmyreva	2	2
(Paraguay) V Pecci (United States) R Tenney	8	4
Q	(United Kingdom) A Jarrett (United Kingdom) D Jevans	9	6
(Japan) J Kamiwazumi (United States) A Kiyomura	6	6
(Australia) P McNamara (Australia) C Matison	0	3
(Australia) E Ewert (Sweden) M Wikstedt	6	6
(New Zealand) C Lewis (Australia) W Turnbull	3	4
(United Kingdom) J Paish (Australia) W Paish	1	4
2	(South Africa) F McMillan (Netherlands) B Stöve	6	6

Second round
(Australia) T Little (Australia) P Whytcross
(India) V Amritraj (United States) K May	w/o
(Australia) P Dent (United Kingdom) V Wade	9	4	6
(South Africa) B Bertram (South Africa) I Kloss	7	6	4
Q	(United Kingdom) A Jarrett (United Kingdom) D Jevans	2	2
(Japan) J Kamiwazumi (United States) A Kiyomura	6	6
(Australia) E Ewert (Sweden) M Wikstedt	3	2
2	(South Africa) F McMillan (Netherlands) B Stöve	6	6

Third round
(India) V Amritraj (United States) K May	9	6
(Australia) P Dent (United Kingdom) V Wade	8	4
(Japan) J Kamiwazumi (United States) A Kiyomura	7	5
2	(South Africa) F McMillan (Netherlands) B Stöve	9	7

Quarterfinals
(India) V Amritraj (United States) K May	1	1
2	(South Africa) F McMillan (Netherlands) B Stöve	6	6
