= 1976 Wimbledon Championships – Girls' singles =

Girls' singles
- 1976 Wimbledon Championships

Final
- Champion: (Soviet Union) Natasha Chmyreva
- Runner-up: (South Africa) Marise Kruger
- Score: 6–3, 2–6, 6–1

Details
- Draw: 32

Events
Singles	men	women		boys	girls
Doubles	men	women	mixed	boys	girls
← 1975 ·	Wimbledon Championships	· 1977 →

Natasha Chmyreva successfully defended her title, defeating Marise Kruger in the final, 6–3, 2–6, 6–1 to win the girls' singles tennis title at the 1976 Wimbledon Championships.

== Draw ==
=== Key ===
- Q = Qualifier
- WC = Wild card
- LL = Lucky loser
- Alt = Alternate
- SE = Special exempt
- PR = Protected ranking
- ITF = ITF entry
- JE = Junior exempt
- w/o = Walkover
- r = Retired
- d = Defaulted
- SR = Special ranking

=== Finals ===
Semifinals
(Soviet Union) Natasha Chmyreva	6	6
(United Kingdom) Michelle Tyler	4	2
(South Africa) Marise Kruger	8	6
(Czechoslovakia) Regina Maršíková	6	3

Final
(Soviet Union) Natasha Chmyreva	6	2	6
(South Africa) Marise Kruger	3	6	1

=== Top half ===
First round
(Soviet Union) Natasha Chmyreva	6	6
(Brazil) Paola Sessarego	2	3
(France) Perrine du Puy	8	3	6
(Poland) Małgorzata Sieradzka	6	6	2
(United States) Lea Antonoplis	6	6
(New Zealand) Sally Chapman	4	3
(Socialist Federal Republic of Yugoslavia) Nenni Delmestre	0	1
(Canada) N Marois	6	6
(United Kingdom) Michelle Tyler	6	6
(Egypt) SA El Marashi	0	1
(Republic of Ireland) Louise Tuff	2	2
(Norway) E Torkildsen	6	6
(United States) Robin Tenney	6	6
(South Korea) Helen Park	0	1
(Portugal) M Lencastro	1	6	2
(Denmark) HH Thomsen	6	4	6

Second round
(Soviet Union) N Chmyreva	6	6
(France) P du Puy	0	1
(United States) L Antonoplis	6	3	6
(Canada) N Marois	0	6	2
(United Kingdom) M Tyler	6	6
(Norway) E Torkildsen	0	1
(United States) R Tenney	6	6
(Denmark) HH Thomsen	2	2

Quarterfinals
(Soviet Union) N Chmyreva	2	6	6
(United States) L Antonoplis	6	2	2
(United Kingdom) M Tyler	6	6
(United States) R Tenney	3	3

Semifinals
(Soviet Union) N Chmyreva	6	6
(United Kingdom) M Tyler	4	2

=== Bottom half ===
First round
(Japan) Y Watanabe	6	6
(India) SJ Jones	3	1
(Finland) T Ojala	3	3
(Australia) Michelle Pekovitch	6	6
(Jamaica) LY Sam	6	6
(Soviet Union) Svetlana Cherneva	8	8
(Belgium) Martine Van De Winkel	0	0
(South Africa) Marise Kruger	6	6
(Kenya) J Davies	3	3
(Switzerland) Petra Delhees	6	6
(Sweden) Nina Bohm	6	6
(United Kingdom) Anthea Cooper	1	2
(Netherlands) I Korsten	6	6
(Israel) Hagit Zubary	3	3
(Bulgaria) Marina Kondova	1	0
(Czechoslovakia) Regina Maršíková	6	6

Second round
(Japan) Y Watanabe	1	1
(Australia) M Pekovitch	6	6
(Soviet Union) S Cherneva	1	2
(South Africa) M Kruger	6	6
(Switzerland) P Delhees	3	4
(Sweden) N Bohm	6	6
(Netherlands) I Korsten	3	3
(Czechoslovakia) R Maršíková	6	6

Quarterfinals
(Australia) M Pekovitch	1	6
(South Africa) M Kruger	6	8
(Sweden) N Bohm	6	2	2
(Czechoslovakia) R Maršíková	2	6	6

Semifinals
(South Africa) M Kruger	8	6
(Czechoslovakia) R Maršíková	6	3
