= 1976 Wimbledon Championships – Women's singles =

Women's singles
- 1976 Wimbledon Championships

Final
- Champion: (United States) Chris Evert
- Runner-up: (Australia) Evonne Goolagong Cawley
- Score: 6–3, 4–6, 8–6

Details
- Draw: 96 (8 Q )
- Seeds: 8

Events
Singles	men	women		boys	girls
Doubles	men	women	mixed	boys	girls
← 1975 ·	Wimbledon Championships	· 1977 →

Chris Evert defeated Evonne Goolagong Cawley in the final, 6–3, 4–6, 8–6 to win the ladies' singles tennis title at the 1976 Wimbledon Championships. It was her second Wimbledon singles title and fifth major singles title overall.

Billie Jean King was the reigning champion, but had retired from singles play.

Three-time champion Maria Bueno competed at Wimbledon for the first time since 1968.

== Seeds ==
1. (United States) Chris Evert (champion)
2. (Australia) Evonne Goolagong Cawley (final)
3. (United Kingdom) Virginia Wade (semifinals)
4. (United States) Martina Navratilova (semifinals)
5. (Soviet Union) Olga Morozova (quarterfinals)
6. (United States) Rosie Casals (quarterfinals)
7. (United Kingdom) Sue Barker (quarterfinals)
8. (Australia) Kerry Reid (quarterfinals)

Click on the seed number of a player to go to their draw section.

== Qualifying ==
The seeding list was accurately reflected in the tournament result, with all the seeds achieving their expected final achievements. This is the only example in the entire Wimbledon history where the seeding for either the gentlemen's or ladies' singles has been replicated in the results.

== Draw ==
=== Key ===
- Q = Qualifier
- WC = Wild card
- LL = Lucky loser
- Alt = Alternate
- ITF = ITF entry
- PR = Protected ranking
- SR = Special ranking
- SE = Special exempt
- JE = Junior exempt
- JR = Junior Accelerator Programme entrant
- CO = College Accelerator Programme entrant
- NG = Next Gen Accelerator Program entrant
- w/o = Walkover
- r = Retired
- d = Defaulted

=== Finals ===
Quarterfinals
1	(United States) Chris Evert	6	6
5	(Soviet Union) Olga Morozova	3	0
4	(United States) Martina Navratilova	6	3	7
7	(United Kingdom) Sue Barker	3	6	5
8	(Australia) Kerry Reid	4	2
3	(United Kingdom) Virginia Wade	6	6
6	(United States) Rosie Casals	5	3
2	(Australia) Evonne Goolagong Cawley	7	6

Semifinals
1	(United States) Chris Evert	6	4	6
4	(United States) Martina Navratilova	3	6	4
3	(United Kingdom) Virginia Wade	1	2
2	(Australia) Evonne Goolagong Cawley	6	6

Final
1	(United States) Chris Evert	6	4	8
2	(Australia) Evonne Goolagong Cawley	3	6	6

=== Top half ===
==== Section 1 ====
First round
1	(United States) C Evert	6	6
(United States) L Thomas	1	1
(United Kingdom) W Wooldridge	7	6
(Romania) M Simionescu	5	0
(Netherlands) B Stöve	6	6
(United States) E Nagelsen	3	0
Q	(Australia) C Matison	5	3
(United States) E Norton	7	6

Second round
1	(United States) C Evert	6	6
(United Kingdom) A Coe	0	0
(United Kingdom) W Wooldridge	0	4
(Australia) L Hunt	6	6
LL	(Australia) S Saliba	1	2
(Netherlands) B Stöve	6	6
(United States) E Norton	6	9
(South Africa) E Vlotman	3	8

Third round
1	(United States) C Evert	6	6
(Australia) L Hunt	1	0
(Netherlands) B Stöve	6	6
(United States) E Norton	3	2

Fourth round
1	(United States) C Evert	6	6
(Netherlands) B Stöve	2	2

==== Section 2 ====
First round
5	(Soviet Union) O Morozova	6	6
(United States) A Kiyomura	3	1
(United Kingdom) L Blachford	5	5
(United States) T Fretz	7	7
Q	(Australia) V Lancaster-Kerr	3	3
(United States) M Louie	6	6
(United Kingdom) B Thompson	1	1
(Soviet Union) N Chmyreva	6	6

Second round
5	(Soviet Union) O Morozova	6	6
Q	(United States) M McLean	2	0
(Czechoslovakia) R Maršíková	6	6
(United States) T Fretz	2	4
(United States) M Louie	2	2
(South Africa) I Kloss	6	6
(United States) J Evert	1	3
(Soviet Union) N Chmyreva	6	6

Third round
5	(Soviet Union) O Morozova	6	6
(Czechoslovakia) R Maršíková	4	1
(South Africa) I Kloss	5	4
(Soviet Union) N Chmyreva	7	6

Fourth round
5	(Soviet Union) O Morozova	6	4	6
(Soviet Union) N Chmyreva	4	6	1

==== Section 3 ====
First round
4	(United States) M Navratilova	3	6	6
(United States) L duPont	6	1	3
(United States) S Mehmedbasich	3	1
(United States) L Antonoplis	6	6
(United Kingdom) J Fayter	6	6
(Netherlands) T Zwaan	2	4
(United States) J Russell	6	5	6
(United Kingdom) L Charles	3	7	4

Second round
4	(United States) M Navratilova	6	6
(Belgium) M Gurdal	2	1
(United States) L Antonoplis	6	6
(West Germany) I Riedel	3	2
(United Kingdom) J Fayter	6	3	5
(France) F Dürr	3	6	7
(United States) J Metcalf	4	1
(United States) J Russell	6	6

Third round
4	(United States) M Navratilova	6	6
(United States) L Antonoplis	1	4
(France) F Dürr	6	6
(United States) J Russell	4	4

Fourth round
4	(United States) M Navratilova	2	6	7
(France) F Dürr	6	3	5

==== Section 4 ====
First round
7	(United Kingdom) S Barker	6	7
Q	(Sweden) M Wikstedt	1	5
(United States) L Tenney	3	4
(United States) V Ziegenfuss	6	6
(United States) M Guerrant	9	6
(France) G Lovera	7	2
(United States) R Tenney	4	4
(Brazil) M Bueno	6	6

Second round
7	(United Kingdom) S Barker	6	7
Q	(United States) C Martinez	4	5
(United States) V Ziegenfuss	3	6	6
(United States) K Kuykendall	6	3	1
(United States) M Guerrant	6	6
LL	(New Zealand) C Newton	1	1
(United States) A-M Bruning	4	6	6
(Brazil) M Bueno	6	3	8

Third round
7	(United Kingdom) S Barker	3	7	6
(United States) V Ziegenfuss	6	5	2
(United States) M Guerrant	4	6	3
(Brazil) M Bueno	6	3	6

Fourth round
7	(United Kingdom) S Barker	2	6	6
(Brazil) M Bueno	6	2	1

=== Bottom half ===
==== Section 5 ====
First round
(United States) K Harter	6	7
(Romania) F Mihai	4	5
(South Africa) G Stevens	6	6
(United Kingdom) L Mottram	3	4
(Australia) J Dimond	2	2
(Australia) C Doerner	6	6
(United States) M Redondo	4	4
8	(Australia) K Reid	6	6

Second round
(Czechoslovakia) R Tomanová	6	3	9
(United States) K Harter	3	6	7
(South Africa) G Stevens	6	6
(Uruguay) F Bonicelli	0	1
(Australia) C Doerner	6	6
(United Kingdom) V Burton	2	1
(United States) P Teeguarden	4	6	2
8	(Australia) K Reid	6	1	6

Third round
(Czechoslovakia) R Tomanová	2	7	7
(South Africa) G Stevens	6	5	9
(Australia) C Doerner	5	2^{r}
8	(Australia) K Reid	7	4

Fourth round
(South Africa) G Stevens	6	3	1
8	(Australia) K Reid	3	6	6

==== Section 6 ====
First round
(South Africa) M Kruger	6	6
(Romania) V Ruzici	2	4
(South Africa) D Boshoff	4	7	2
(United States) P Hogan	6	5	6
(Australia) W Paish	2	4
(South Africa) B Cuypers	6	6
(United Kingdom) M Tyler	3	4
3	(United Kingdom) V Wade	6	6

Second round
(South Africa) M Kruger	6	6
(West Germany) H Eisterlehner	3	4
(United States) P Hogan	2	4
(Australia) W Turnbull	6	6
(United States) M Michel	6	6
(South Africa) B Cuypers	2	2
(United Kingdom) S Mappin	1	0
3	(United Kingdom) V Wade	6	6

Third round
(South Africa) M Kruger	8	6
(Australia) W Turnbull	6	4
(United States) M Michel	3	3
3	(United Kingdom) V Wade	6	6

Fourth round
(South Africa) M Kruger	6	3	5
3	(United Kingdom) V Wade	2	6	7

==== Section 7 ====
First round
(Sweden) C Sandberg	3	6
Q	(United States) A Spex	6	8
(United Kingdom) G Coles	4	6
(Sweden) I Bentzer	6	8
(Italy) S Simmonds	2	2
(United States) T Holladay	6	6
(United Kingdom) L Beaven	3	2
6	(United States) R Casals	6	6

Second round
(Colombia) I Fernández de Soto	3	4
Q	(United States) A Spex	6	6
(Socialist Federal Republic of Yugoslavia) M Jaušovec	4	6	6
(Sweden) I Bentzer	6	4	2
(South Africa) A McMillan	4	8
(United States) T Holladay	6	9
Q	(United States) P Bostrom	2	4
6	(United States) R Casals	6	6

Third round
Q	(United States) A Spex	6	0
(Socialist Federal Republic of Yugoslavia) M Jaušovec	8	6
(United States) T Holladay	4	2
6	(United States) R Casals	6	6

Fourth round
(Socialist Federal Republic of Yugoslavia) M Jaušovec	2	5
6	(United States) R Casals	6	7

==== Section 8 ====
First round
LL	(United Kingdom) A Cooper	2	2
(United States) J Anthony	6	6
(Australia) D Fromholtz	6	6
(South Africa) V Vermaak	1	4
(South Africa) R Whitehouse	3	6
Q	(United Kingdom) C Molesworth	6	8
(Netherlands) E Vessies-Appel	2	5
2	(Australia) E Goolagong Cawley	6	7

Second round
(United States) J Anthony	6	6
(Japan) N Sato	2	4
(Australia) D Fromholtz	6	6
(United States) K May	0	4
(South Africa) A du Plooy	6	5	5
(United Kingdom) C Molesworth	2	7	7
(United States) S Walsh	0	5
2	(Australia) E Goolagong Cawley	6	7

Third round
(United States) J Anthony	4	8
(Australia) D Fromholtz	6	9
(United Kingdom) C Molesworth	1	1
2	(Australia) E Goolagong Cawley	6	6

Fourth round
(Australia) D Fromholtz	3	0
2	(Australia) E Goolagong Cawley	6	6

== See also ==
- Evert–Navratilova rivalry

Preceded by 1976 French Open – Women's singles	Grand Slam women's singles	Succeeded by 1976 US Open – Women's singles
