= 1975 Wimbledon Championships – Women's singles =

Women's singles
- 1975 Wimbledon Championships

Final
- Champion: (United States) Billie Jean King
- Runner-up: (Australia) Evonne Goolagong Cawley
- Score: 6–0, 6–1

Details
- Draw: 96 (8 Q )
- Seeds: 8

Events
Singles	men	women		boys	girls
Doubles	men	women	mixed	boys	girls
← 1974 ·	Wimbledon Championships	· 1976 →

Billie Jean King defeated Evonne Goolagong Cawley in the final, 6–0, 6–1 to win the ladies' singles tennis title at the 1975 Wimbledon Championships. It was her sixth Wimbledon singles title and twelfth and last major singles title overall.

Chris Evert was the defending champion, but lost in the semifinals to King.

== Seeds ==
1. (United States) Chris Evert (semifinals)
2. (Czechoslovakia) Martina Navrátilová (quarterfinals)
3. (United States) Billie Jean King (champion)
4. (Australia) Evonne Goolagong Cawley (final)
5. (Australia) Margaret Court (semifinals)
6. (United Kingdom) Virginia Wade (quarterfinals)
7. (Soviet Union) Olga Morozova (quarterfinals)
8. (Australia) Kerry Reid (second round)

Click on the seed number of a player to go to their draw section.

== Draw ==
=== Key ===
- Q = Qualifier
- WC = Wild card
- LL = Lucky loser
- Alt = Alternate
- ITF = ITF entry
- PR = Protected ranking
- SR = Special ranking
- SE = Special exempt
- JE = Junior exempt
- JR = Junior Accelerator Programme entrant
- CO = College Accelerator Programme entrant
- NG = Next Gen Accelerator Program entrant
- w/o = Walkover
- r = Retired
- d = Defaulted

=== Finals ===
Quarterfinals
1	(United States) Chris Evert	5	7	6
(Netherlands) Betty Stöve	7	5	0
3	(United States) Billie Jean King	6	6
7	(Soviet Union) Olga Morozova	3	3
6	(United Kingdom) Virginia Wade	7	3	7
4	(Australia) Evonne Goolagong Cawley	5	6	9
5	(Australia) Margaret Court	6	6
2	(Czechoslovakia) Martina Navrátilová	3	4

Semifinals
1	(United States) Chris Evert	6	2	3
3	(United States) Billie Jean King	2	6	6
4	(Australia) Evonne Goolagong Cawley	6	6
5	(Australia) Margaret Court	4	4

Final
3	(United States) Billie Jean King	6	6
4	(Australia) Evonne Goolagong Cawley	0	1

=== Top half ===
==== Section 1 ====
First round
1	(United States) C Evert	6	6
(Australia) C O'Neil	0	2
Q	(United States) L Tenney	3	3
(Japan) K Sawamatsu	6	6
(Australia) J Dalton	9	6
(United Kingdom) A Coe	7	3
(United Kingdom) L Mottram	4	6	6
Q	(United States) R Stark	6	4	0

Second round
1	(United States) C Evert	6	6
(Netherlands) E Appel	0	1
(United States) R Tenney	4	3
(Japan) K Sawamatsu	6	6
(Australia) J Dalton	3	1
(United Kingdom) L Beaven	6	6
(South Africa) B Cuypers	3	3
(United Kingdom) L Mottram	6	6

Third round
1	(United States) C Evert	6	6
(Japan) K Sawamatsu	2	2
(United Kingdom) L Beaven	6	6
(United Kingdom) L Mottram	4	2

Fourth round
1	(United States) C Evert	6	6
(United Kingdom) L Beaven	2	4

==== Section 2 ====
First round
8	(Australia) K Reid	6	2	6
(Soviet Union) Y Granaturova	2	6	4
(Sweden) H Anliot	2	8	2
(Netherlands) B Stöve	6	6	6
(United Kingdom) L Blachford	6	1	2
(United Kingdom) W Wooldridge	3	6	6
(Australia) J Young	1	0
(United States) M Michel	6	6

Second round
8	(Australia) K Reid	4	0^{r}
(United Kingdom) S Barker	6	1
(United States) E Nagelsen	5	1
(Netherlands) B Stöve	7	6
(United Kingdom) W Wooldridge	9	6
(United States) S Walsh	7	4
(United States) M Michel	6	6
(Italy) L Pericoli	1	4

Third round
(United Kingdom) S Barker	0	6	2
(Netherlands) B Stöve	6	4	6
(United Kingdom) W Wooldridge	6	6
(United States) M Michel	4	4

Fourth round
(Netherlands) B Stöve	9	6
(United Kingdom) W Wooldridge	7	3

==== Section 3 ====
First round
3	(United States) BJ King	6	6
(South Africa) E Vlotman	1	4
(Sweden) M Forsgårdh	3	2
(United States) J Anthony	6	6
(Belgium) M Gurdal	6	6
Q	(Japan) N Sato	1	1
(France) R Darmon	6	6	9
(Romania) V Ruzici	8	2	7

Second round
3	(United States) BJ King	6	6
(United Kingdom) V Burton	1	3
(United States) J Anthony	6	6
(Israel) P Peisachov	2	3
(France) O de Roubin	0	1
(Belgium) M Gurdal	6	6
(United States) V Ziegenfuss	8	6
(France) R Darmon	6	3

Third round
3	(United States) BJ King	6	6
(United States) J Anthony	2	3
(Belgium) M Gurdal	6	6
(United States) V Ziegenfuss	3	3

Fourth round
3	(United States) BJ King	6	6
(Belgium) M Gurdal	1	2

==== Section 4 ====
First round
(France) F Dürr	6	7
(Romania) M Simionescu	4	5
(Netherlands) T Zwaan	7	6
(Italy) A-M Nasuelli	5	2
(United States) P Teeguarden	6	6
(United States) D Ganz	2	4
(Australia) C Matison	6	2	1
Q	(United States) PA Reese	3	6	6

Second round
7	(Soviet Union) O Morozova	6	4	6
(France) F Dürr	3	6	1
(Netherlands) T Zwaan	1	1
Q	(United States) K May	6	6
(Socialist Federal Republic of Yugoslavia) M Jaušovec	3	6	11
(United States) P Teeguarden	6	1	9
(France) N Fuchs	6	2	0^{r}
Q	(United States) PA Reese	0	6	0

Third round
7	(Soviet Union) O Morozova	4	9	6
Q	(United States) K May	6	7	1
(Socialist Federal Republic of Yugoslavia) M Jaušovec	6	9
Q	(United States) PA Reese	2	7

Fourth round
7	(Soviet Union) O Morozova	6	6
(Socialist Federal Republic of Yugoslavia) M Jaušovec	4	2

=== Bottom half ===
==== Section 5 ====
First round
(France) G Chanfreau	2	6	1
(United States) R Casals	6	2	6
(Hungary) M Pinterová	0	4
(South Africa) D Boshoff	6	6
(United States) J Newberry	6	6
(Netherlands) M Schaar	2	1
(West Germany) I Riedel	5	6	7
(United States) B Downs	7	0	5

Second round
(Australia) L Hunt	7	3	6
(United States) R Casals	5	6	8
(United States) N Richey	6	2	4
(South Africa) D Boshoff	3	6	6
(United States) J Newberry	6	6
(Indonesia) L Kaligis	3	1
(West Germany) I Riedel	1	3
6	(United Kingdom) V Wade	6	6

Third round
(United States) R Casals	6	6
(South Africa) D Boshoff	2	1
(United States) J Newberry	2	8	6
6	(United Kingdom) V Wade	6	6	8

Fourth round
(United States) R Casals	4	6	4
6	(United Kingdom) V Wade	6	4	6

==== Section 6 ====
First round
Q	(West Germany) H Eisterlehner	2	6	5
(United Kingdom) J Fayter	6	2	7
(Australia) W Paish	6	0
(Australia) C Doerner	8	6
LL	(United States) J Haas	4	4
Q	(United States) L Rupert	6	6
(Australia) H Gourlay	7	6
(United Kingdom) J Hume	5	4

Second round
Q	(Australia) J Dimond	6	6
(United Kingdom) J Fayter	3	2
(Australia) C Doerner	6	7	4
(United Kingdom) M Tyler	0	9	6
(South Africa) I Kloss	6	7
Q	(United States) L Rupert	3	5
(Australia) H Gourlay	6	1	1
4	(Australia) E Goolagong Cawley	3	6	6

Third round
Q	(Australia) J Dimond	6	6
(United Kingdom) M Tyler	4	4
(South Africa) I Kloss	3	2
4	(Australia) E Goolagong Cawley	6	6

Fourth round
Q	(Australia) J Dimond	2	4
4	(Australia) E Goolagong Cawley	6	6

==== Section 7 ====
First round
(United States) P Hogan	6	6
(United States) A Kiyomura	2	2
(Uruguay) F Bonicelli	4	6	6
(South Africa) Y Vermaak	6	2	0
(New Zealand) J Connor	6	2	14
(France) F Guédy	3	6	12
(Australia) D Fromholtz	1	2
5	(Australia) M Court	6	6

Second round
(Argentina) R Giscafré	2	6	2
(United States) P Hogan	6	2	6
(United Kingdom) G Coles	7	6
(Uruguay) F Bonicelli	5	4
(Czechoslovakia) R Tomanová	6	6
(New Zealand) J Connor	0	2
(United States) S Greer	2	3
5	(Australia) M Court	6	6

Third round
(United States) P Hogan	5	3
(United Kingdom) G Coles	7	6
(Czechoslovakia) R Tomanová	0	0
5	(Australia) M Court	6	6

Fourth round
(United Kingdom) G Coles	2	2
5	(Australia) M Court	6	6

==== Section 8 ====
First round
(Soviet Union) N Chmyreva	6	6
(United States) C Meyer	2	3
(United States) T Holladay	3	4
(South Africa) R Whitehouse	6	6
(Sweden) I Bentzer	2	2
(South Africa) G Stevens	6	6
(Australia) W Turnbull	2	6
2	(Czechoslovakia) M Navrátilová	6	8

Second round
(Soviet Union) N Chmyreva	6	6
LL	(United Kingdom) C Molesworth	0	4
(South Africa) R Whitehouse	2	4
(United Kingdom) L Charles	6	6
(United States) L duPont	6	1
(South Africa) G Stevens	8	6
(United Kingdom) S Mappin	1	2
2	(Czechoslovakia) M Navrátilová	6	6

Third round
(Soviet Union) N Chmyreva	8	7
(United Kingdom) L Charles	6	5
(South Africa) G Stevens	4	3
2	(Czechoslovakia) M Navrátilová	6	6

Fourth round
(Soviet Union) N Chmyreva	1	0
2	(Czechoslovakia) M Navrátilová	6	6

Preceded by 1975 French Open – Women's singles	Grand Slam women's singles	Succeeded by 1975 US Open – Women's singles
