= 1976 Wimbledon Championships – Women's doubles =

Women's doubles
- 1976 Wimbledon Championships

Final
- Champions: (United States) Chris Evert (Czechoslovakia) Martina Navratilova
- Runners-up: (United States) Billie Jean King (Netherlands) Betty Stöve
- Score: 6–1, 3–6, 7–5

Details
- Draw: 48 (3 Q )
- Seeds: 4

Events
Singles	men	women		boys	girls
Doubles	men	women	mixed	boys	girls
← 1975 ·	Wimbledon Championships	· 1977 →

Chris Evert and Martina Navratilova defeated Billie Jean King and Betty Stöve in the final, 6–1, 3–6, 7–5 to win the ladies' doubles tennis title at the 1976 Wimbledon Championships. It was the only Wimbledon doubles title and third major doubles title for Evert, and the first Wimbledon doubles title and second doubles major title for Navratilova.

Ann Kiyomura and Kazuko Sawamatsu were the reigning champions, but Sawamatsu did not compete. Kiyomura partnered Mona Guerrant, but they lost in the third round to Lesley Charles and Sue Mappin.

== Seeds ==
1. (United States) Billie Jean King / (Netherlands) Betty Stöve (final)
2. (United States) Chris Evert / (Czechoslovakia) Martina Navratilova (champions)
3. (Soviet Union) Olga Morozova / (United Kingdom) Virginia Wade (first round)
4. (Australia) Evonne Cawley / (United States) Peggy Michel (third round)

Click on the seed number of a player to go to their draw section.

== Draw ==
=== Key ===
- Q = Qualifier
- WC = Wild card
- LL = Lucky loser
- Alt = Alternate
- SE = Special exempt
- PR = Protected ranking
- ITF = ITF entry
- JE = Junior exempt
- w/o = Walkover
- r = Retired
- d = Defaulted
- SR = Special ranking

=== Finals ===
Quarterfinals
1	(United States) Billie Jean King (Netherlands) Betty Stöve	6	6
(United States) Laura duPont (Australia) Wendy Turnbull	3	3
(United Kingdom) Lesley Charles (United Kingdom) Sue Mappin	6	7
(United Kingdom) Joyce Hume (United Kingdom) Winnie Wooldridge	4	5
(South Africa) Linky Boshoff (South Africa) Ilana Kloss	6	6
(United States) Rosie Casals (France) Françoise Dürr	1	3
Q	(Australia) Chris O'Neil (Australia) Jenny Walker	3	0
2	(United States) Chris Evert (Czechoslovakia) Martina Navratilova	6	6

Semifinals
1	(United States) Billie Jean King (Netherlands) Betty Stöve	6	6
(United Kingdom) Lesley Charles (United Kingdom) Sue Mappin	4	3
(South Africa) Linky Boshoff (South Africa) Ilana Kloss	6	6
2	(United States) Chris Evert (Czechoslovakia) Martina Navratilova	8	8

Final
1	(United States) Billie Jean King (Netherlands) Betty Stöve	1	6	5
2	(United States) Chris Evert (Czechoslovakia) Martina Navratilova	6	3	7

=== Top half ===
==== Section 1 ====
First round
1	(United States) BJ King (Netherlands) B Stöve	6	6
Q	(Australia) D Evers (Australia) C Zeeman	4	1
(South Africa) A du Plooy (United States) S Walsh	6	6
(United States) P Hogan (United States) V Ziegenfuss	3	4
(United States) J Anthony (United States) P Teeguarden	6	6
(Belgium) M Gurdal (Belgium) M Van Haver	0	3
(South Africa) B Cuypers (Australia) D Fromholtz	8	4
(United States) L duPont (Australia) W Turnbull	9	6

Second round
1	(United States) BJ King (Netherlands) B Stöve	w/o
(Australia) C Doerner (United States) M Redondo
(United States) A-M Bruning (United States) S Greer	6	1	5
(South Africa) A du Plooy (United States) S Walsh	4	6	7
(United Kingdom) L Mottram (United Kingdom) B Thompson	3	0
(United States) J Anthony (United States) P Teeguarden	6	6
(United States) L duPont (Australia) W Turnbull	6	9
(Czechoslovakia) R Maršíková (Czechoslovakia) R Tomanová	2	8

Third round
1	(United States) BJ King (Netherlands) B Stöve	6	6
(South Africa) A du Plooy (United States) S Walsh	3	0
(United States) J Anthony (United States) P Teeguarden	6	3	2
(United States) L duPont (Australia) W Turnbull	1	6	6

Quarterfinals
1	(United States) BJ King (Netherlands) B Stöve	6	6
(United States) L duPont (Australia) W Turnbull	3	3

==== Section 2 ====
First round
3	(Soviet Union) O Morozova (United Kingdom) V Wade	4	4
(United States) M Guerrant (United States) A Kiyomura	6	6
(Uruguay) F Bonicelli (Italy) A-M Nasuelli	1	4
(United Kingdom) L Charles (United Kingdom) S Mappin	6	6
(United States) C Martinez (United States) J Stratton	6	3
(United Kingdom) J Hume (United Kingdom) W Wooldridge	8	6
(United Kingdom) V Burton (United Kingdom) C Molesworth	5	7	1
LL	(United Kingdom) D Jevans (Australia) C Matison	7	5	6

Second round
(United States) M Guerrant (United States) A Kiyomura	6	6
(New Zealand) J Connor (South Africa) Y Vermaak	0	0
(United Kingdom) G Coles (Romania) F Mihai	6	1	5
(United Kingdom) L Charles (United Kingdom) S Mappin	4	6	7
(United Kingdom) J Hume (United Kingdom) W Wooldridge	w/o
(Netherlands) E Vessies-Appel (Netherlands) T Zwaan
(South Africa) M Kruger (South Africa) E Vlotman	6	6
LL	(United Kingdom) D Jevans (Australia) C Matison	3	1

Third round
(United States) M Guerrant (United States) A Kiyomura	5	6	4
(United Kingdom) L Charles (United Kingdom) S Mappin	7	4	6
(United Kingdom) J Hume (United Kingdom) W Wooldridge	0	6	6
(South Africa) M Kruger (South Africa) E Vlotman	6	2	4

Quarterfinals
(United Kingdom) L Charles (United Kingdom) S Mappin	6	7
(United Kingdom) J Hume (United Kingdom) W Wooldridge	4	5

=== Bottom half ===
==== Section 3 ====
First round
(United States) K May (United States) E Norton	4	3
(South Africa) D Boshoff (South Africa) I Kloss	6	6
(United Kingdom) L Blachford (United Kingdom) A Coe	2	2
(Australia) L Hunt (South Africa) G Stevens	6	6
(United States) R Casals (France) F Dürr	6	6
(United States) K Kuykendall (Sweden) I Bentzer	2	2
(Colombia) I Fernández de Soto (Socialist Federal Republic of Yugoslavia) M Jaušovec	2	5
4	(Australia) E Cawley (United States) M Michel	6	7

Second round
(South Africa) D Boshoff (South Africa) I Kloss	6	6
(West Germany) H Eisterlehner (West Germany) I Riedel	3	1
(United Kingdom) L Beaven (United States) T Fretz	4	2
(Australia) L Hunt (South Africa) G Stevens	6	6
(United States) R Casals (France) F Dürr	6	6
(Romania) V Ruzici (Romania) M Simionescu	3	3
(United States) B Buckley (United States) L Thomas	1	5
4	(Australia) E Cawley (United States) M Michel	6	7

Third round
(South Africa) D Boshoff (South Africa) I Kloss	6	8
(Australia) L Hunt (South Africa) G Stevens	1	6
(United States) R Casals (France) F Dürr	7	9
4	(Australia) E Cawley (United States) M Michel	5	7

Quarterfinals
(South Africa) D Boshoff (South Africa) I Kloss	6	6
(United States) R Casals (France) F Dürr	1	3

==== Section 4 ====
First round
(United Kingdom) J Fayter (United Kingdom) M Tyler	6	6
(United States) L Tenney (United States) R Tenney	0	2
Q	(Australia) J Morton (Australia) J Wilton	6	2	1
(United States) S Mehmedbasich (Sweden) M Wikstedt	3	6	6
(United States) J Evert (United States) T Holladay	6	8	4
(United States) E Nagelsen (United States) J Russell	4	9	6
(United Kingdom) S Barker (Soviet Union) N Chmyreva	3	2
2	(United States) C Evert (Czechoslovakia) M Navratilova	6	6

Second round
Q	(Australia) C O'Neil (Australia) J Walker	6	7
(United Kingdom) J Fayter (United Kingdom) M Tyler	2	5
(United States) S Mehmedbasich (Sweden) M Wikstedt	3	6	6
(United States) P Bostrom (United States) J Metcalf	6	4	1
(Australia) J Dimond (Australia) W Paish	7	3
(United States) E Nagelsen (United States) J Russell	9	6
(South Africa) A McMillan (South Africa) R Whitehouse	1	4
2	(United States) C Evert (Czechoslovakia) M Navratilova	6	6

Third round
Q	(Australia) C O'Neil (Australia) J Walker	9	6
(United States) S Mehmedbasich (Sweden) M Wikstedt	8	4
(United States) E Nagelsen (United States) J Russell	3	4
2	(United States) C Evert (Czechoslovakia) M Navratilova	6	6

Quarterfinals
Q	(Australia) C O'Neil (Australia) J Walker	3	0
2	(United States) C Evert (Czechoslovakia) M Navratilova	6	6
