= 1975 Wimbledon Championships – Girls' singles =

Girls' singles
- 1975 Wimbledon Championships

Final
- Champion: (Soviet Union) Natasha Chmyreva
- Runner-up: (Czechoslovakia) Regina Maršíková
- Score: 6–4, 6–3

Details
- Draw: 33

Events
Singles	men	women		boys	girls
Doubles	men	women	mixed	boys	girls
← 1974 ·	Wimbledon Championships	· 1976 →

Natasha Chmyreva defeated Regina Maršíková in the final, 6–4, 6–3 to win the girls' singles tennis title at the 1975 Wimbledon Championships.

== Draw ==
=== Key ===
- Q = Qualifier
- WC = Wild card
- LL = Lucky loser
- Alt = Alternate
- SE = Special exempt
- PR = Protected ranking
- ITF = ITF entry
- JE = Junior exempt
- w/o = Walkover
- r = Retired
- d = Defaulted
- SR = Special ranking

=== Finals ===
Quarterfinals
(South Africa) Greer Stevens	8	6
(United States) Susan Hagey	6	3
(Czechoslovakia) Regina Maršíková	6	6
(West Germany) Sylvia Hanika	2	0
(United States) Barbara Jordan	7	6
(United Kingdom) Linda Mottram	9	8
(United Kingdom) Michelle Tyler	3	2
(Soviet Union) Natasha Chmyreva	6	6

Semifinals
(South Africa) Greer Stevens	w/o
(Czechoslovakia) Regina Maršíková
(United Kingdom) Linda Mottram	2	4
(Soviet Union) Natasha Chmyreva	6	6

Finals
(Czechoslovakia) Regina Maršíková	4	3
(Soviet Union) Natasha Chmyreva	6	6

=== Top half ===
==== Section 1 ====
First round

Second round
(South Africa) Greer Stevens	6	6
(Norway) E Torkildsen	0	1
(Italy) Annalisa Pesce	6	6
(Finland) C Paulsson	0	2
(United States) Susan Hagey	6	6
(Belgium) M Decrop	2	1
(Israel) R Heller	4	2
(Netherlands) I Korsten	6	6

Third round
(South Africa) G Stevens	6	6
(Italy) A Pesce	4	2
(United States) S Hagey	6	6
(Netherlands) I Korsten	3	1

Quarterfinals
(South Africa) G Stevens	8	6
(United States) S Hagey	6	3

==== Section 2 ====
First round
(Belgium) A Gerain	2	9	6
(United Kingdom) Anthea Cooper	6	7	2

Second round
(Czechoslovakia) Regina Maršíková
(Spain) María Mateo	w/o
(Denmark) I Langermann	1	1
(Belgium) A Gerain	6	6
(Australia) Diane Eastburn	6	6
(Socialist Federal Republic of Yugoslavia) Dora Alavantić	3	3
(West Germany) Sylvia Hanika	6	6
(Norway) B Giaever	2	0

Third round
(Czechoslovakia) R Maršíková	6	7
(Belgium) A Gerain	4	5
(Australia) D Eastburn	1	5
(West Germany) S Hanika	6	7

Quarterfinals
(Czechoslovakia) R Maršíková	6	6
(West Germany) S Hanika	2	0

=== Bottom half ===
==== Section 3 ====
First round

Second round
(Kenya) J Davies	0	3
(Sweden) Vladimira Andersson	6	6
(Brazil) S Cuellas	0	1
(United States) Barbara Jordan	6	6
(Belgium) G Ceuster	6	6
(Israel) H Tsuberi	1	2
(Canada) Marjorie Blackwood	2	4
(United Kingdom) Linda Mottram	6	6

Third round
(Sweden) V Andersson	2	5
(United States) B Jordan	6	7
(Belgium) G Ceuster	1	1
(United Kingdom) L Mottram	6	6

Quarterfinals
(United States) B Jordan	7	6
(United Kingdom) L Mottram	9	8

==== Section 4 ====
First round

Second round
(Republic of Ireland) A Russell	3	6
(Mexico) Alina Balbiers	6	8
(Switzerland) Annemarie Rüegg	1	4
(United Kingdom) Michelle Tyler	6	6
(France) Perrine du Puy	6	7
(Argentina) V Locicerio	4	5
(Egypt) SA El Marashi	1	0
(Soviet Union) Natasha Chmyreva	6	6

Third round
(Mexico) A Balbiers	4	1
(United Kingdom) M Tyler	6	6
(France) P du Puy	0	0
(Soviet Union) N Chmyreva	6	6

Quarterfinals
(United Kingdom) M Tyler	3	2
(Soviet Union) N Chmyreva	6	6
