= 1976 Wimbledon Championships =

- Date: 21 June – 3 July
- Edition: 90th
- Category: Grand Slam
- Draw: 128S / 64D
- Prize money: £157,740
- Surface: Grass
- Location: Church Road; SW19, Wimbledon, London, United Kingdom
- Venue: All England Lawn Tennis and Croquet Club

Champions

Men's singles
- (Sweden) Björn Borg

Women's singles
- (United States) Chris Evert

Men's doubles
- (United States) Brian Gottfried / (Mexico) Raúl Ramírez

Women's doubles
- (United States) Chris Evert / (United States) Martina Navratilova

Mixed doubles
- (Australia) Tony Roche / (France) Françoise Dürr

Boys' singles
- (Switzerland) Heinz Günthardt

Girls' singles
- (Soviet Union) Natasha Chmyreva
← 1975 ·	Wimbledon Championships	· 1977 →

The 1976 Wimbledon Championships was a tennis tournament that took place on the outdoor grass courts at the All England Lawn Tennis and Croquet Club in Wimbledon, London, United Kingdom. The tournament was held from Monday 21 June until Saturday 3 July 1976. It was the 90th staging of the Wimbledon Championships, and the second Grand Slam tennis event of 1976. Despite the ongoing drought and heatwave of 1976, the 90th staging of the tournament went ahead as planned. Björn Borg and Chris Evert won the singles titles.

== Prize money ==
The total prize money for 1976 championships was £157,740. The winner of the men's title earned £12,500 while the women's singles champion earned £10,000.

Event	W	F	SF	QF	Round of 16	Round of 32	Round of 64	Round of 128
Men's singles	£12,500	£7,000	£3,000	£1,500	£1,100	£500	£300	£150
Women's singles	£10,000	£5,600	£2,400	£1,200	£600	£300	£200	£150
Men's doubles *	£3,000	£1,500	£1,000	£500	£250	£0	£0	—
Women's doubles *	£2,400	£1,200	£500	£250	£125	£0	£0	—
Mixed doubles *	£1,000	£500	£300	£200	£100	£0	£0	—

_{* per team}

== Champions ==
=== Seniors ===
==== Men's singles ====
(Sweden) Björn Borg defeated (Romania) Ilie Năstase, 6–4, 6–2, 9–7

==== Women's singles ====
(United States) Chris Evert defeated (Australia) Evonne Goolagong Cawley, 6–3, 4–6, 8–6

==== Men's doubles ====
(United States) Brian Gottfried / (Mexico) Raúl Ramírez defeated (Australia) Ross Case / (Australia) Geoff Masters, 3–6, 6–3, 8–6, 2–6, 7–5

==== Women's doubles ====
(United States) Chris Evert / (United States) Martina Navratilova defeated (United States) Billie Jean King / (Netherlands) Betty Stöve, 6–1, 3–6, 7–5

==== Mixed doubles ====
(Australia) Tony Roche / (France) Françoise Dürr defeated (United States) Dick Stockton / (United States) Rosie Casals, 6–3, 2–6, 7–5

=== Juniors ===
==== Boys' singles ====
(Switzerland) Heinz Günthardt defeated (West Germany) Peter Elter, 6–4, 7–5

==== Girls' singles ====
(Soviet Union) Natasha Chmyreva defeated (South Africa) Marise Kruger, 6–3, 2–6, 6–1

== Singles seeds ==
=== Men's singles ===
1. (United States) Arthur Ashe (fourth round, lost to Vitas Gerulaitis)
2. (United States) Jimmy Connors (quarterfinals, lost to Roscoe Tanner)
3. (Romania) Ilie Năstase (final, lost to Björn Borg)
4. (Sweden) Björn Borg (champion)
5. (Italy) Adriano Panatta (third round, lost to Charlie Pasarell)
6. (Argentina) Guillermo Vilas (quarterfinals, lost to Björn Borg)
7. (United States) Roscoe Tanner (semifinals, lost to Björn Borg)
8. (Mexico) Raúl Ramírez (semifinals, lost to Ilie Năstase)
9. (Netherlands) Tom Okker (third round, lost to Phil Dent)
10. (Australia) John Newcombe (third round, lost to Bernard Mitton)
11. (United States) Eddie Dibbs (withdrew before the tournament began)
12. (Australia) Tony Roche (fourth round, lost to Guillermo Vilas)
13. (Chile) Jaime Fillol (third round, lost to Onny Parun)
14. (United States) Brian Gottfried (fourth round, lost to Björn Borg)
15. (Czechoslovakia) Jan Kodeš (withdrew before the tournament began)
16. (United States) Stan Smith (fourth round, lost to Jimmy Connors)

=== Women's singles ===
1. (United States) Chris Evert (champion)
2. (Australia) Evonne Goolagong Cawley (final, lost to Chris Evert)
3. (United Kingdom) Virginia Wade (semifinals, lost to Evonne Goolagong Cawley)
4. (United States) Martina Navratilova (semifinals, lost to Chris Evert)
5. (Soviet Union) Olga Morozova (quarterfinals, lost to Chris Evert)
6. (United States) Rosie Casals (quarterfinals, lost to Evonne Goolagong Cawley)
7. (United Kingdom) Sue Barker (quarterfinals, lost to Martina Navrátilová)
8. (Australia) Kerry Reid (quarterfinals, lost to Virginia Wade)

Preceded by 1976 French Open	Grand Slams	Succeeded by 1976 US Open
