= 1975 Wimbledon Championships – Women's doubles =

Women's doubles
- 1975 Wimbledon Championships

Final
- Champions: (United States) Ann Kiyomura (Japan) Kazuko Sawamatsu
- Runners-up: (France) Françoise Dürr (Netherlands) Betty Stöve
- Score: 7–5, 1–6, 7–5

Details
- Draw: 48 (3 Q )
- Seeds: 4

Events
Singles	men	women		boys	girls
Doubles	men	women	mixed	boys	girls
← 1974 ·	Wimbledon Championships	· 1976 →

Evonne Goolagong and Peggy Michel were the defending champions, but lost in the second round to Sue Barker and Glynis Coles.

Ann Kiyomura and Kazuko Sawamatsu defeated Françoise Dürr and Betty Stöve in the final, 7–5, 1–6, 7–5 to win the ladies' doubles tennis title at the 1975 Wimbledon Championships.

== Seeds ==
1. (Australia) Evonne Goolagong / (United States) Peggy Michel (second round)
2. (United States) Rosie Casals / (United States) Billie Jean King (semifinals)
3. (United States) Chris Evert / (Czechoslovakia) Martina Navrátilová (quarterfinals)
4. (Australia) Margaret Court / (United Kingdom) Virginia Wade (quarterfinals)

Click on the seed number of a player to go to their draw section.

== Draw ==
=== Key ===
- Q = Qualifier
- WC = Wild card
- LL = Lucky loser
- Alt = Alternate
- SE = Special exempt
- PR = Protected ranking
- ITF = ITF entry
- JE = Junior exempt
- w/o = Walkover
- r = Retired
- d = Defaulted
- SR = Special ranking

=== Finals ===
Quarterfinals
(United Kingdom) Sue Barker (United Kingdom) Glynis Coles	6	8
(United States) Ann Kiyomura (Japan) Kazuko Sawamatsu	8	9
3	(United States) Chris Evert (Czechoslovakia) Martina Navrátilová	1	6	8
(France) Gail Chanfreau (Australia) Helen Gourlay	6	4	10
(France) Françoise Dürr (Netherlands) Betty Stöve	6	6
4	(Australia) Margaret Court (United Kingdom) Virginia Wade	4	3
(United States) Julie Anthony (Soviet Union) Olga Morozova	7	8
2	(United States) Rosie Casals (United States) Billie Jean King	9	9

Semifinals
(United States) Ann Kiyomura (Japan) Kazuko Sawamatsu	6	6	6
(France) Gail Chanfreau (Australia) Helen Gourlay	6	8	2
(France) Françoise Dürr (Netherlands) Betty Stöve	2	8	6
2	(United States) Rosie Casals (United States) Billie Jean King	6	6	2

Final
(United States) Ann Kiyomura (Japan) Kazuko Sawamatsu	7	1	7
(France) Françoise Dürr (Netherlands) Betty Stöve	5	6	5

=== Top half ===
==== Section 1 ====
First round
1	(Australia) E Goolagong (United States) M Michel	6	6
(Sweden) H Anliot (Sweden) M Wikstedt	4	2
(United States) B Jordan (Romania) M Simionescu	2	4
(United States) L duPont (Australia) W Turnbull	6	6
(Australia) L Hunt (United States) V Ziegenfuss	6	6
(Australia) C Matison (Australia) P Whytcross	3	3
(United States) P Hogan (South Africa) E Vlotman	6	6
(Sweden) I Bentzer (United States) R Tenney	2	2

Second round
1	(Australia) E Goolagong (United States) M Michel	4	9	4
(United Kingdom) S Barker (United Kingdom) G Coles	6	8	6
(United States) L duPont (Australia) W Turnbull	w/o
(France) O de Roubin (France) B Simon
(Australia) L Hunt (United States) V Ziegenfuss	4	2
(United States) A Kiyomura (Japan) K Sawamatsu	6	6
(United States) P Hogan (South Africa) E Vlotman	6	6
(Belgium) M Gurdal (Belgium) M Van Haver	4	4

Third round
(United Kingdom) S Barker (United Kingdom) G Coles	8	6
(United States) L duPont (Australia) W Turnbull	6	4
(United States) A Kiyomura (Japan) K Sawamatsu	3	6	6
(United States) P Hogan (South Africa) E Vlotman	6	4	4

Quarterfinals
(United Kingdom) S Barker (United Kingdom) G Coles	6	8
(United States) A Kiyomura (Japan) K Sawamatsu	8	9

==== Section 2 ====
First round
3	(United States) C Evert (Czechoslovakia) M Navrátilová	6	6
Q	(Australia) J Walker (Australia) K Walker	0	3
(United States) T Holladay (United States) C Meyer	w/o
(France) N Fuchs (Israel) P Peisachov
Q	(Australia) J Dimond (United Kingdom) P Moor	7	6
(West Germany) H Eisterlehner (West Germany) I Riedel	5	1
(United States) P Teeguarden (Czechoslovakia) R Tomanová	2	6	6
(United States) K May (South Africa) G Stevens	6	1	1

Second round
3	(United States) C Evert (Czechoslovakia) M Navrátilová	6	6
(United States) E Nagelsen (United States) L Tenney	1	4
(United States) T Holladay (United States) C Meyer	7	3	6
(Sweden) M Forsgårdh (Sweden) C Sandberg	5	6	2
Q	(Australia) J Dimond (United Kingdom) P Moor	9	6
(Indonesia) L Kaligis (Indonesia) L Sugiarto	8	6
(France) G Chanfreau (Australia) H Gourlay	7	7
(United States) P Teeguarden (Czechoslovakia) R Tomanová	5	5

Third round
3	(United States) C Evert (Czechoslovakia) M Navrátilová	7	6	7
(United States) T Holladay (United States) C Meyer	9	2	5
Q	(Australia) J Dimond (United Kingdom) P Moor	1	1
(France) G Chanfreau (Australia) H Gourlay	6	6

Quarterfinals
3	(United States) C Evert (Czechoslovakia) M Navrátilová	1	6	8
(France) G Chanfreau (Australia) H Gourlay	6	4	10

=== Bottom half ===
==== Section 3 ====
First round
(South Africa) B Cuypers (South Africa) R Whitehouse	1	4
(France) F Dürr (Netherlands) B Stöve	6	6
(United Kingdom) V Burton (United Kingdom) C Molesworth	2	1
(United Kingdom) L Charles (United Kingdom) S Mappin	6	6
(South Africa) D Boshoff (South Africa) I Kloss	6	6
(United Kingdom) L Geeves (United Kingdom) M Tyler	2	2
(Argentina) I Roget (Argentina) E Weisenberger	0	1
4	(Australia) M Court (United Kingdom) V Wade	6	6

Second round
(France) F Dürr (Netherlands) B Stöve	w/o
(Italy) L Bassi (Italy) L Pericoli
(Japan) K Fukuoka (Japan) T Sade	1	3
(United Kingdom) L Charles (United Kingdom) S Mappin	6	6
(Australia) J Hanrahan (Australia) K Ruddell	1	6
(South Africa) D Boshoff (South Africa) I Kloss	6	8
(Uruguay) F Bonicelli (Socialist Federal Republic of Yugoslavia) M Jaušovec	2	3
4	(Australia) M Court (United Kingdom) V Wade	6	6

Third round
(France) F Dürr (Netherlands) B Stöve	7	6
(United Kingdom) L Charles (United Kingdom) S Mappin	5	4
(South Africa) D Boshoff (South Africa) I Kloss	2	4
4	(Australia) M Court (United Kingdom) V Wade	6	6

Quarterfinals
(France) F Dürr (Netherlands) B Stöve	6	6
4	(Australia) M Court (United Kingdom) V Wade	4	3

==== Section 4 ====
First round
(Australia) D Fromholtz (Argentina) R Giscafré	1	6	4
Q	(Romania) F Mihai (Japan) N Sato	6	0	6
(United States) J Anthony (Soviet Union) O Morozova	7	6
(United States) J Newberry (United States) S Walsh	5	4
(United Kingdom) J Hume (United Kingdom) W Wooldridge	6	5	6
(Australia) J Dalton (Australia) J Young	3	7	3
(Netherlands) E Appel (Netherlands) T Zwaan	2	2
2	(United States) R Casals (United States) BJ King	6	6

Second round
(France) R Darmon (Hungary) M Pinterová	6	6
Q	(Romania) F Mihai (Japan) N Sato	3	3
(United Kingdom) L Beaven (Australia) W Paish	5	2
(United States) J Anthony (Soviet Union) O Morozova	7	6
(United Kingdom) J Hume (United Kingdom) W Wooldridge	4	6	6
(Australia) C Doerner (Australia) C O'Neil	6	1	4
(United Kingdom) A Coe (United Kingdom) B Thompson	0	4
2	(United States) R Casals (United States) BJ King	6	6

Third round
(France) R Darmon (Hungary) M Pinterová	1	1
(United States) J Anthony (Soviet Union) O Morozova	6	6
(United Kingdom) J Hume (United Kingdom) W Wooldridge	2	0
2	(United States) R Casals (United States) BJ King	6	6

Quarterfinals
(United States) J Anthony (Soviet Union) O Morozova	7	8
2	(United States) R Casals (United States) BJ King	9	9
