= 1975 Wimbledon Championships – Boys' singles =

Boys' singles
- 1975 Wimbledon Championships

Final
- Champion: (New Zealand) Chris Lewis
- Runner-up: (Ecuador) Ricardo Ycaza
- Score: 6–1, 6–4

Events
Singles	men	women		boys	girls
Doubles	men	women	mixed	boys	girls
← 1974 ·	Wimbledon Championships	· 1976 →

Chris Lewis defeated Ricardo Ycaza in the final, 6–1, 6–4 to win the boys' singles tennis title at the 1975 Wimbledon Championships.

== Draw ==
=== Key ===
- Q = Qualifier
- WC = Wild card
- LL = Lucky loser
- Alt = Alternate
- SE = Special exempt
- PR = Protected ranking
- ITF = ITF entry
- JE = Junior exempt
- w/o = Walkover
- r = Retired
- d = Defaulted
- SR = Special ranking

=== Finals ===
Quarterfinals
(New Zealand) Chris Lewis	1	6	6
(Sweden) Ulf Eriksson	6	1	4
(India) Ashok Amritraj	3	6
(Australia) Brad Drewett	6	8
(Ecuador) Ricardo Ycaza	6	6
(United States) Ben McKown	3	4
(United Kingdom) Rohun Beven	0	4
(Italy) Gianni Ocleppo	6	6

Semifinals
(New Zealand) Chris Lewis	6	1	7
(Australia) Brad Drewett	4	6	5
(Ecuador) Ricardo Ycaza	9	6
(Italy) Gianni Ocleppo	8	4

Final
(New Zealand) Chris Lewis	6	6
(Ecuador) Ricardo Ycaza	1	4

=== Top half ===
==== Section 1 ====
First round
(Belgium) Johan de Muynck	3	3
(Czechoslovakia) Dušan Kulhaj	6	6
(France) Jérôme Vanier	6	6
(Iran) Y Saleh	1	1
(Mexico) Ruben Zárate	2	7	6
(Nigeria) S Ona	6	5	2
(Sweden) Ulf Eriksson	6	6
(Egypt) MA el Wahby	1	1

Second round
(New Zealand) Chris Lewis	6	6
(Czechoslovakia) D Kulhaj	0	2
(France) J Vanier	6	6
(Mexico) MAN Osuna	2	3
(Mexico) R Zárate	2	7	8
(Philippines) E Rizarri	6	5	6
(South Africa) Peter Lamb	0	0
(Sweden) U Eriksson	6	6

Third round
(New Zealand) C Lewis	6	6
(France) J Vanier	0	4
(Mexico) R Zárate	1	2
(Sweden) U Eriksson	6	6

Quarterfinals
(New Zealand) C Lewis	1	6	6
(Sweden) U Eriksson	6	1	4

==== Section 2 ====
First round
(India) Ashok Amritraj	6	6
(Finland) Raimo Ojala	0	2
(Pakistan) J Ahmed	3	4
(Switzerland) Heinz Günthardt	6	6
(Argentina) Fernando Dalla Fontana	7	6
(Belgium) Bernard Boileau	5	4
(Nigeria) Nduka Odizor	6	6
(Portugal) J Paulo	4	1

Second round
(India) A Amritraj	6	8
(Norway) P Hagen	4	6
(United Kingdom) Chris Kaskow	6	4	6
(Switzerland) H Günthardt	3	6	3
(Australia) Brad Drewett	7	6
(Argentina) F Dalla Fontana	5	1
(Nigeria) N Odizor	3	6	9
(Sudan) AF Toubia	6	4	7

Third round
(India) A Amritraj	6	6
(United Kingdom) C Kaskow	4	2
(Australia) B Drewett	6	6
(Nigeria) N Odizor	1	2

Quarterfinals
(India) A Amritraj	3	6
(Australia) B Drewett	6	8

=== Bottom half ===
==== Section 3 ====
First round
(Sri Lanka) Sivagnanam Suresh	6	6
(Uruguay) Hugo Roverano	3	1
(Argentina) José Luis Clerc	6	3	4
(Ecuador) Ricardo Ycaza	3	6	6
(Australia) Warren Maher	6	6
(Israel) Shai Puni	1	3
(Nigeria) Segun Balogun	3	1
(United States) Ben McKown	6	6

Second round
(Sri Lanka) S Suresh	5	3
(Mexico) SC Mondragon	7	6
(West Germany) Klaus Eberhard	8	2
(Ecuador) R Ycaza	9	6
(Pakistan) I Haq	0	2
(Australia) W Maher	6	6
(Netherlands) O van der Wildenberg	4	1
(United States) B McKown	6	6

Third round
(Mexico) SC Mondragon	2	3
(Ecuador) R Ycaza	6	6
(Australia) W Maher	4	1
(United States) B McKown	6	6

Quarterfinals
(Ecuador) R Ycaza	6	6
(United States) B McKown	3	4

==== Section 4 ====
First round
(Spain) Lorenzo Fargas	6	6
(Belgium) E Pilette	2	3
(Canada) DK Becker	6	6
(India) Swamy Krishnan	2	4
(Brazil) Celso Sacomandi	4	3
(Italy) Gianni Ocleppo	6	6
(Denmark) Christian Buchwald	4	3
(United Kingdom) Andrew Jarrett	6	6

Second round
(Norway) Ragnar Felix	3	3
(Spain) L Fargas	6	6
(Canada) DK Becker	3	4
(United Kingdom) Rohun Beven	6	6
(Republic of Ireland) Ken Fitzgibbon	0	3
(Italy) G Ocleppo	6	6
(West Germany) Peter Elter	6	0
(United Kingdom) A Jarrett	8	6

Third round
(Spain) L Fargas	2	4
(United Kingdom) R Beven	6	6
(Italy) G Ocleppo	6	8	6
(United Kingdom) A Jarrett	8	6	3

Quarterfinals
(United Kingdom) R Beven	0	4
(Italy) G Ocleppo	6	6
