= 1975 Wimbledon Championships – Mixed doubles =

Mixed doubles
- 1975 Wimbledon Championships

Final
- Champions: (United States) Marty Riessen (Australia) Margaret Court
- Runners-up: (Australia) Allan Stone (Netherlands) Betty Stöve
- Score: 6–4, 7–5

Details
- Draw: 64 (3 Q )
- Seeds: 4

Events
Singles	men	women		boys	girls
Doubles	men	women	mixed	boys	girls
← 1974 ·	Wimbledon Championships	· 1976 →

Owen Davidson and Billie Jean King were the defending champions, but Davidson did not compete. King partnered with Tony Roche but withdrew in the third round.

Marty Riessen and Margaret Court defeated Allan Stone and Betty Stöve in the final, 6–4, 7–5 to win the mixed doubles tennis title at the 1975 Wimbledon Championships.

== Seeds ==
1. (United States) Marty Riessen / (Australia) Margaret Court (champions)
2. (Australia) Tony Roche / (United States) Billie Jean King (third round)
3. (Czechoslovakia) Jan Kodeš / (Czechoslovakia) Martina Navrátilová (semifinals)
4. (Soviet Union) Alex Metreveli / (Soviet Union) Olga Morozova (semifinals)

Click on the seed number of a player to go to their draw section.

== Draw ==
=== Key ===
- Q = Qualifier
- WC = Wild card
- LL = Lucky loser
- Alt = Alternate
- SE = Special exempt
- PR = Protected ranking
- ITF = ITF entry
- JE = Junior exempt
- w/o = Walkover
- r = Retired
- d = Defaulted
- SR = Special ranking

=== Finals ===
Quarterfinals
1	(United States) Marty Riessen (Australia) Margaret Court	9	6
(South Africa) Frew McMillan (Australia) Judy Dalton	8	2
3	(Czechoslovakia) Jan Kodeš (Czechoslovakia) Martina Navrátilová	6	6
(South Africa) John Yuill (South Africa) Rowena Whitehouse	3	3
LL	(Australia) Ernie Ewert (Sweden) Mimmi Wikstedt	4	4
4	(Soviet Union) Alex Metreveli (Soviet Union) Olga Morozova	6	6
(South Africa) Bob Hewitt (United States) Rosie Casals	8	2
(Australia) Allan Stone (Netherlands) Betty Stöve	9	6

Semifinals
1	(United States) Marty Riessen (Australia) Margaret Court	5	6	6
3	(Czechoslovakia) Jan Kodeš (Czechoslovakia) Martina Navrátilová	7	3	2
4	(Soviet Union) Alex Metreveli (Soviet Union) Olga Morozova	6	4	4
(Australia) Allan Stone (Netherlands) Betty Stöve	2	6	6

Final
1	(United States) Marty Riessen (Australia) Margaret Court	6	7
(Australia) Allan Stone (Netherlands) Betty Stöve	4	5

=== Top half ===
==== Section 1 ====
First round
1	(United States) M Riessen (Australia) M Court	6	6
(Australia) N Fraser (Australia) J Young	3	3
(Chile) P Rodríguez (Chile) M Rodríguez	1	2
(Australia) J Alexander (Australia) L Hunt	6	6
(Colombia) I Molina (Czechoslovakia) R Tomanová	6	8	7
(South Africa) P Cramer (United Kingdom) J Hume	4	9	9
(Australia) C Kachel (Australia) C O'Neil	2	4
(Australia) P McNamara (Australia) C Matison	6	6
(India) V Amritraj (United States) K May	6	6
(United Kingdom) S Warboys (United States) J Newberry	4	3
(United States) S Stewart (South Africa) I Kloss	6	6
(New Zealand) A Parun (New Zealand) J Connor	4	4
(South Africa) F McMillan (Australia) J Dalton	6	6
(Japan) J Kuki (Japan) T Sade	1	3
(United Kingdom) M Collins (United Kingdom) A Coe	3	4
(Soviet Union) T Kakulia (Soviet Union) N Chmyreva	6	6

Second round
1	(United States) M Riessen (Australia) M Court	7	6
(Australia) J Alexander (Australia) L Hunt	5	4
(South Africa) P Cramer (United Kingdom) J Hume	7	6	6
(Australia) P McNamara (Australia) C Matison	9	3	2
(India) V Amritraj (United States) K May	6	6
(United States) S Stewart (South Africa) I Kloss	3	4
(South Africa) F McMillan (Australia) J Dalton	6	7
(Soviet Union) T Kakulia (Soviet Union) N Chmyreva	4	5

Third round
1	(United States) M Riessen (Australia) M Court	6	6
(South Africa) P Cramer (United Kingdom) J Hume	4	2
(India) V Amritraj (United States) K May	6	3	5
(South Africa) F McMillan (Australia) J Dalton	3	6	7

Quarterfinals
1	(United States) M Riessen (Australia) M Court	9	6
(South Africa) F McMillan (Australia) J Dalton	8	2

==== Section 2 ====
First round
3	(Czechoslovakia) J Kodeš (Czechoslovakia) M Navrátilová	w/o
(United States) J Austin (United States) P Teeguarden
(Brazil) T Koch (Sweden) H Anliot	6	6
(South Africa) B Bertram (South Africa) B Cuypers	2	2
(Australia) G Perkins (Australia) W Turnbull	5	6	4
Q	(Australia) T Little (Australia) P Whytcross	7	4	6
(South Africa) D Schroder (South Africa) G Stevens	6	3
(Australia) K Warwick (Australia) E Cawley	8	6
(United States) R Dell (Australia) H Gourlay	0	6	6
(United States) F McNair (Israel) P Peisachov	6	3	3
Q	(Australia) N Callaghan (Australia) J Walker	4	4
(Rhodesia) C Dowdeswell (South Africa) D Boshoff	6	6
(Austria) P Pokorny (Austria) S Pachta	4	6	2
(United Kingdom) R Wilson (United Kingdom) J Fayter	6	4	6
(United Kingdom) D Lloyd (Australia) C Doerner	3	7
(South Africa) J Yuill (South Africa) R Whitehouse	6	9

Second round
3	(Czechoslovakia) J Kodeš (Czechoslovakia) M Navrátilová	6	6
(Brazil) T Koch (Sweden) H Anliot	1	4
Q	(Australia) T Little (Australia) P Whytcross	6	3	4
(Australia) K Warwick (Australia) E Cawley	3	6	6
(United States) R Dell (Australia) H Gourlay	6	7	4
(Rhodesia) C Dowdeswell (South Africa) D Boshoff	8	9	6
(United Kingdom) R Wilson (United Kingdom) J Fayter	0	1
(South Africa) J Yuill (South Africa) R Whitehouse	6	6

Third round
3	(Czechoslovakia) J Kodeš (Czechoslovakia) M Navrátilová	6	6
(Australia) K Warwick (Australia) E Cawley	3	3
(Rhodesia) C Dowdeswell (South Africa) D Boshoff	6	8	3
(South Africa) J Yuill (South Africa) R Whitehouse	3	9	6

Quarterfinals
3	(Czechoslovakia) J Kodeš (Czechoslovakia) M Navrátilová	6	6
(South Africa) J Yuill (South Africa) R Whitehouse	3	3

=== Bottom half ===
==== Section 3 ====
First round
(Brazil) JE Mandarino (Spain) C Mandarino	w/o
(United States) S Krulevitz (United Kingdom) L Mottram
(United States) M Machette (United States) S Walsh	2	5
LL	(Australia) E Ewert (Sweden) M Wikstedt	6	7
(Netherlands) R Thung (Netherlands) T Zwaan
(France) J Lovera (France) G Chanfreau	w/o
(United Kingdom) K Wooldridge (United Kingdom) W Wooldridge	w/o
(Australia) A McDonald (United States) P Hogan
(United Kingdom) R Lewis (United Kingdom) G Coles	6	6
(Colombia) J Velasco (Argentina) R Giscafré	4	3
(United Kingdom) J Paish (Australia) W Paish	w/o
(Sweden) T Svensson (Sweden) M Forsgårdh
(United Kingdom) R Drysdale (United Kingdom) L Beaven	4	6	4
(Socialist Federal Republic of Yugoslavia) N Pilić (Socialist Federal Republic of Yugoslavia) M Jaušovec	6	3	6
(United Kingdom) J Feaver (Australia) D Fromholtz	4	0
4	(Soviet Union) A Metreveli (Soviet Union) O Morozova	6	6

Second round
(Brazil) JE Mandarino (Spain) C Mandarino	5	1
LL	(Australia) E Ewert (Sweden) M Wikstedt	7	6
(France) J Lovera (France) G Chanfreau	6	6
(United Kingdom) K Wooldridge (United Kingdom) W Wooldridge	4	3
(United Kingdom) R Lewis (United Kingdom) G Coles	9	4	7
(United Kingdom) J Paish (Australia) W Paish	8	6	5
(Socialist Federal Republic of Yugoslavia) N Pilić (Socialist Federal Republic of Yugoslavia) M Jaušovec	4	5
4	(Soviet Union) A Metreveli (Soviet Union) O Morozova	6	7

Third round
LL	(Australia) E Ewert (Sweden) M Wikstedt	9	3	6
(France) J Lovera (France) G Chanfreau	7	6	2
(United Kingdom) R Lewis (United Kingdom) G Coles	3	1
4	(Soviet Union) A Metreveli (Soviet Union) O Morozova	6	6

Quarterfinals
LL	(Australia) E Ewert (Sweden) M Wikstedt	4	4
4	(Soviet Union) A Metreveli (Soviet Union) O Morozova	6	6

==== Section 4 ====
First round
(South Africa) R Hewitt (United States) R Casals	6	6
(Belgium) B Mignot (Belgium) M Gurdal	3	2
(Japan) J Kamiwazumi (United States) A Kiyomura	9	1	9
(United States) J Holladay (United States) T Holladay	8	6	11
(United States) G Reid (Australia) K Reid
(United Kingdom) M Cox (United Kingdom) V Wade	w/o
Q	(Rhodesia) A Fawcett (United States) PA Reese	3	2
(Australia) R Case (France) F Dürr	6	6
(Australia) A Stone (Netherlands) B Stöve	w/o
(United Kingdom) M Farrell (United Kingdom) L Charles
Q	(South Africa) B Mitton (South Africa) E Vlotman	w/o
(Italy) P Bertolucci (Italy) D Marzano
(Japan) Y Tezuka (Japan) K Sawamatsu	7	2	6
(United Kingdom) J Lloyd (United Kingdom) L Blachford	5	6	4
(Mexico) M Lara (France) R Darmon	2	1
2	(Australia) A Roche (United States) BJ King	6	6

Second round
(South Africa) R Hewitt (United States) R Casals	6	6
(United States) J Holladay (United States) T Holladay	4	4
(United Kingdom) M Cox (United Kingdom) V Wade	5	2
(Australia) R Case (France) F Dürr	7	6
(Australia) A Stone (Netherlands) B Stöve	8	6
Q	(South Africa) B Mitton (South Africa) E Vlotman	6	3
(Japan) Y Tezuka (Japan) K Sawamatsu	3	5
2	(Australia) A Roche (United States) BJ King	6	7

Third round
(South Africa) R Hewitt (United States) R Casals	6	2	6
(Australia) R Case (France) F Dürr	4	6	4
(Australia) A Stone (Netherlands) B Stöve	w/o
2	(Australia) A Roche (United States) BJ King

Quarterfinals
(South Africa) R Hewitt (United States) R Casals	8	2
(Australia) A Stone (Netherlands) B Stöve	9	6
