= Yuji Tezuka =

Japanese tennis player (born 1943)

- Native name: 手塚雄士
- Country (sports): Japan
- Born: 14 August 1943 (age 81)

Singles
- Highest ranking: No. 177 (5 March 1975)

Grand Slam singles results
- French Open: Q3 (1975)
- Wimbledon: Q3 (1974)

Doubles

Grand Slam doubles results
- Wimbledon: 2R (1975)

Grand Slam mixed doubles results
- Wimbledon: 2R (1975)

Yuji Tezuka (born 14 August 1943) is a Japanese former professional tennis player.

Tezuka was active on the tour in the 1970s and appeared in two Davis Cup ties for his country. He won both of his doubles rubbers, as well as his only singles rubber. In 1975 he featured in the main draw of the Wimbledon Championships as a doubles player.

== See also ==
- List of Japan Davis Cup team representatives
