= 1975 Wimbledon Championships – Men's singles =

Men's singles
- 1975 Wimbledon Championships

Final
- Champion: (United States) Arthur Ashe
- Runner-up: (United States) Jimmy Connors
- Score: 6–1, 6–1, 5–7, 6–4

Details
- Draw: 128 (16 Q )
- Seeds: 16

Events
Singles	men	women		boys	girls
Doubles	men	women	mixed	boys	girls
← 1974 ·	Wimbledon Championships	· 1976 →

Arthur Ashe defeated defending champion Jimmy Connors in the final, 6–1, 6–1, 5–7, 6–4 to win the gentlemen's singles tennis title at the 1975 Wimbledon Championships. It was his first Wimbledon title and third and last major singles title overall. Ashe was the first Black man to win the singles title at Wimbledon, and the second Black player to do so overall, after Althea Gibson. The final is widely regarded as a tactical masterpiece by Ashe, and one of the biggest upsets in Wimbledon history.

== Seeds ==
1. (United States) Jimmy Connors (final)
2. (Australia) Ken Rosewall (fourth round)
3. (Sweden) Björn Borg (quarterfinals)
4. (Argentina) Guillermo Vilas (quarterfinals)
5. (Romania) Ilie Năstase (second round)
6. (United States) Arthur Ashe (champion)
7. (United States) Stan Smith (first round)
8. (Mexico) Raúl Ramírez (quarterfinals)
9. (Netherlands) Tom Okker (quarterfinals)
10. (Australia) John Alexander (second round)
11. (United States) Roscoe Tanner (semifinals)
12. (Czechoslovakia) Jan Kodeš (second round)
13. (United States) Marty Riessen (fourth round)
14. (United States) Vitas Gerulaitis (first round)
15. (New Zealand) Onny Parun (third round)
16. (Australia) Tony Roche (semifinals)

Click on the seed number of a player to go to their draw section.

== Draw ==
=== Key ===
- Q = Qualifier
- WC = Wild card
- LL = Lucky loser
- Alt = Alternate
- ITF = ITF entry
- PR = Protected ranking
- SR = Special ranking
- SE = Special exempt
- JE = Junior exempt
- JR = Junior Accelerator Programme entrant
- CO = College Accelerator Programme entrant
- NG = Next Gen Accelerator Program entrant
- w/o = Walkover
- r = Retired
- d = Defaulted

=== Finals ===
Quarterfinals
1	(United States) Jimmy Connors	6	8	6
8	(Mexico) Raúl Ramírez	4	6	2
4	(Argentina) Guillermo Vilas	4	7	8	2	2
11	(United States) Roscoe Tanner	6	5	6	6	6
6	(United States) Arthur Ashe	2	6	8	6
3	(Sweden) Björn Borg	6	4	6	1
9	(Netherlands) Tom Okker	6	8	6	4	2
16	(Australia) Tony Roche	2	9	2	6	6

Semifinals
1	(United States) Jimmy Connors	6	6	6
11	(United States) Roscoe Tanner	4	1	4
6	(United States) Arthur Ashe	5	6	7	8	6
16	(Australia) Tony Roche	7	4	5	9	4

Final
1	(United States) Jimmy Connors	1	1	7	4
6	(United States) Arthur Ashe	6	6	5	6

=== Top half ===
==== Section 1 ====
First round
1	(United States) Jimmy Connors	6	6	6
(United Kingdom) John Lloyd	2	3	1
(India) Vijay Amritraj	7	6	6
(Australia) Barry Phillips-Moore	5	3	4
(Romania) Ion Țiriac	2	2	5
(United Kingdom) Mark Cox	6	6	7
Q	(Rhodesia) Anthony Fawcett	3	3	6
(Mexico) Joaquín Loyo Mayo	6	6	8
14	(United States) Vitas Gerulaitis	6	4	2	6	1
(Australia) Ray Ruffels	3	6	6	3	6
Q	(South Africa) Bernard Mitton	6	6	6
(Colombia) Iván Molina	3	4	4
(United States) Bill Brown	6	9	2	6	3
(Australia) Dick Crealy	8	8	6	3	6
(Australia) Phil Dent	7	3	6	6
(Czechoslovakia) Jan Písecký	5	6	4	2

Second round
1	(United States) J Connors	9	6	8
(India) V Amritraj	8	0	6
(United Kingdom) M Cox	6	3	6	6
(Mexico) J Loyo Mayo	3	6	1	2
(Australia) R Ruffels	4	0^{r}
Q	(South Africa) B Mitton	6	2
(Australia) R Crealy	7	5	3	5
(Australia) P Dent	5	7	6	7

Third round
1	(United States) J Connors	6	6	6
(United Kingdom) M Cox	4	2	2
Q	(South Africa) B Mitton	6	3	4	6	4
(Australia) P Dent	3	6	6	2	6

Fourth round
1	(United States) J Connors	6	6	6
(Australia) P Dent	1	2	2

==== Section 2 ====
First round
8	(Mexico) Raúl Ramírez	6	6	6
(Socialist Federal Republic of Yugoslavia) Nikola Špear	4	0	2
(Australia) Allan Stone	3	3	2
(United States) Jeff Borowiak	6	6	6
(United States) Tom Gorman	1	2	4
(Egypt) Ismail El Shafei	6	6	6
(Italy) Adriano Panatta	6	2	6	6
Q	(Argentina) Lito Álvarez	4	6	2	3
12	(Czechoslovakia) Jan Kodeš	8	6	6
(France) Georges Goven	6	2	3
(Australia) Geoff Masters	6	6	6
Q	(United States) John Holladay	3	1	3
(Rhodesia) Colin Dowdeswell	3	3	3
(United States) Cliff Richey	6	6	6
(Hungary) Balázs Taróczy	8	8	6	6
Q	(United Kingdom) Martin Robinson	9	6	3	4

Second round
8	(Mexico) R Ramírez	1	9	9	6
(United States) J Borowiak	6	8	7	3
(Egypt) I El Shafei	6	4	4	6	3
(Italy) A Panatta	4	6	6	3	6
12	(Czechoslovakia) J Kodeš	6	6	4	6	4
(Australia) G Masters	2	2	6	8	6
(United States) C Richey	9	6	9
(Hungary) B Taróczy	7	4	8

Third round
8	(Mexico) R Ramírez	6	7	7
(Italy) A Panatta	4	5	5
(Australia) G Masters	6	3	3	6	3
(United States) C Richey	3	6	6	4	6

Fourth round
8	(Mexico) R Ramírez	6	6	6
(United States) C Richey	2	3	2

==== Section 3 ====
First round
4	(Argentina) Guillermo Vilas	7	6	6
Q	(New Zealand) Russell Simpson	5	4	4
(South Africa) Ray Moore	4	6	6	6
(South Africa) John Yuill	6	3	4	1
(West Germany) Ulrich Pinner	6	7	9	6
(Chile) Patricio Cornejo	8	5	8	4
(United States) Jeff Austin	4	6	3	7	6
Q	(United Kingdom) John Paish	6	4	6	5	2
15	(New Zealand) Onny Parun	6	6	9
(Australia) Neale Fraser	3	2	7
(United States) John Andrews	6	3	6	7	16
LL	(Sweden) Tenny Svensson	3	6	3	9	18
(United States) Sandy Mayer	6	6	6
(Australia) Alvin Gardiner	3	1	0
(Australia) Peter McNamara	1	2	5
Q	(Australia) Mark Edmondson	6	6	7

Second round
4	(Argentina) G Vilas	6	6	6
(South Africa) R Moore	4	3	1
(West Germany) U Pinner	6	3	9	4	6
(United States) J Austin	4	6	8	6	3
15	(New Zealand) O Parun	6	1
LL	(Sweden) T Svensson	2	0^{r}
(United States) A Mayer	6	6	8	6
Q	(Australia) M Edmondson	3	0	9	2

Third round
4	(Argentina) G Vilas	6	9	6
(West Germany) U Pinner	2	7	4
15	(New Zealand) O Parun	4	8	2
(United States) A Mayer	6	9	6

Fourth round
4	(Argentina) G Vilas	2	7	9	6
(United States) A Mayer	6	5	8	3

==== Section 4 ====
First round
5	(Romania) Ilie Năstase	6	6	6
(Soviet Union) Teimuraz Kakulia	2	4	2
(West Germany) Karl Meiler	2	4	5
(United States) Sherwood Stewart	6	6	7
(United States) Mike Estep	6	6	9
(United States) Doug Crawford	2	4	8
(United States) Donald Dell	9	7	1	4	4
(United Kingdom) Robin Drysdale	8	5	6	6	6
11	(United States) Roscoe Tanner	8	6	8	6
(United States) Bob Lutz	6	1	9	4
(United Kingdom) Mark Farrell	6	6	4	5	4
Q	(Paraguay) Víctor Pecci	4	1	6	7	6
(West Germany) Jürgen Fassbender	5	6	6	6
(Austria) Hans Kary	7	3	4	4
(Belgium) Bernard Mignot	3	5	4
(United States) Charles Owens	6	7	6

Second round
5	(Romania) I Năstase	6	8	2	6	3
(United States) S Stewart	8	6	6	1	6
(United States) M Estep	9	5	6	6
(United Kingdom) R Drysdale	8	7	4	4
11	(United States) R Tanner	6	6	9
Q	(Paraguay) V Pecci	3	4	8
(West Germany) J Fassbender	6	1	3	1
(United States) C Owens	2	6	6	6

Third round
(United States) S Stewart	6	6	9	4	6
(United States) M Estep	2	8	8	6	8
11	(United States) R Tanner	9	9	6
(United States) C Owens	8	8	1

Fourth round
(United States) M Estep	8	4	2
11	(United States) R Tanner	9	6	6

=== Bottom half ===
==== Section 5 ====
First round
Q	(United Kingdom) Gerald Battrick	3	4	4
Q	(United Kingdom) Graham Stilwell	6	6	6
(United States) Raz Reid	6	6	6
(South Africa) Frew McMillan	1	4	4
(Australia) Paul Kronk	3	1	6	6	6
(West Germany) Hans-Jürgen Pohmann	6	6	1	3	2
(Japan) Jun Kuki	3	4	4
10	(Australia) John Alexander	6	6	6
Q	(Brazil) Carlos Alberto Kirmayr	6	6	6
(Colombia) Jairo Velasco	0	1	2
(United States) Brian Gottfried	6	6	6
(United Kingdom) Richard Lewis	3	1	1
(Japan) Jun Kamiwazumi	9	3	9	7
(United States) Erik van Dillen	8	6	7	5
(South Africa) Bob Hewitt	5	6	2	4
6	(United States) Arthur Ashe	7	3	6	6

Second round
Q	(United Kingdom) G Stilwell	5	6	7	6	6
(United States) G Reid	7	3	5	8	3
(Australia) P Kronk	1	9	9	9
10	(Australia) J Alexander	6	8	8	8
Q	(Brazil) C Kirmayr	6	5	8	6	4
(United States) B Gottfried	4	7	9	4	6
(Japan) J Kamiwazumi	2	5	4
6	(United States) A Ashe	6	7	6

Third round
Q	(United Kingdom) G Stilwell	6	7	9
(Australia) P Kronk	4	5	8
(United States) B Gottfried	2	3	1
6	(United States) A Ashe	6	6	6

Fourth round
Q	(United Kingdom) G Stilwell	2	7	4	2
6	(United States) A Ashe	6	5	6	6

==== Section 6 ====
First round
(United States) Charlie Pasarell	6	7	6
Q	(United States) Woody Blocher	3	5	3
(United States) Paul Gerken	3	3	6	6	17
(Brazil) José Edison Mandarino	6	6	1	3	15
(United States) Trey Waltke	5	3	3
(Australia) Colin Dibley	7	6	6
(France) Patrick Proisy	3	2	2
13	(United States) Marty Riessen	6	6	6
(Poland) Wojciech Fibak	6	5	7	4
Q	(India) Chiradip Mukerjea	4	7	9	6
(Chile) Jaime Fillol	6	8	6
(United Kingdom) Roger Taylor	3	6	4
(West Germany) Harald Elschenbroich	2	4	4
(Czechoslovakia) Milan Holeček	6	6	6
Q	(Venezuela) Jorge Andrew	2	4	4
3	(Sweden) Björn Borg	6	6	6

Second round
(United States) C Pasarell	6	6	6
(United States) P Gerken	3	3	1
(Australia) C Dibley	8	2	3
13	(United States) M Riessen	9	6	6
Q	(India) C Mukerjea	3	6	2	3
(Chile) J Fillol	6	3	6	6
(Czechoslovakia) M Holeček	6	3	4	8
3	(Sweden) B Borg	3	6	6	9

Third round
(United States) C Pasarell	4	4	6	8
13	(United States) M Riessen	6	6	1	9
(Chile) J Fillol	6	4	4	3
3	(Sweden) B Borg	0	6	6	6

Fourth round
13	(United States) M Riessen	2	6	6	1
3	(Sweden) B Borg	6	8	4	6

==== Section 7 ====
First round
(United States) Rick Fisher	6	5	0	4
(France) Patrice Dominguez	3	7	6	6
(Australia) Bob Carmichael	4	5	1
(Australia) Kim Warwick	6	7	6
(Italy) Antonio Zugarelli	0	4	2
(Pakistan) Haroon Rahim	6	6	6
(Socialist Federal Republic of Yugoslavia) Nikola Pilić	3	6	3
9	(Netherlands) Tom Okker	6	8	6
(Netherlands) Rolf Thung	4	8	4
(France) Jean-François Caujolle	6	9	6
(Soviet Union) Alex Metreveli	6	6	6
(India) Anand Amritraj	4	1	2
(Rhodesia) Andrew Pattison	6	7	6
(Brazil) Thomaz Koch	4	5	3
(South Africa) Byron Bertram	6	6	6
7	(United States) Stan Smith	1	2	1

Second round
(France) P Dominguez	6	6	5	6	1
(Australia) K Warwick	4	8	7	4	6
(Pakistan) H Rahim	9	6	7	3	0
9	(Netherlands) T Okker	8	4	9	6	6
(France) J-F Caujolle	7	4	2	2
(Soviet Union) A Metreveli	5	6	6	6
(Rhodesia) A Pattison	9	4	1	8	6
(South Africa) B Bertram	7	6	6	6	1

Third round
(Australia) K Warwick	3	2	4
9	(Netherlands) T Okker	6	6	6
(Soviet Union) A Metreveli	6	6	6
(Rhodesia) A Pattison	4	1	3

Fourth round
9	(Netherlands) T Okker	6	6	8
(Soviet Union) A Metreveli	0	2	6

==== Section 8 ====
First round
(United States) Steve Krulevitz	4	7	4
(United States) Fred McNair	6	9	6
(United States) Bob Kreiss	9	3	1	9	3
(Australia) Ross Case	7	6	6	8	6
LL	(Australia) John James	2	4	3
(Argentina) Julián Ganzábal	6	6	6
(Czechoslovakia) Jiří Hřebec	3	3	3
16	(Australia) Tony Roche	6	6	6
(Australia) Syd Ball	0	6	6	3
Q	(Venezuela) Humphrey Hose	6	1	8	6
LL	(Argentina) Tito Vázquez	5	7	8	2
(Sweden) Birger Andersson	7	9	6	6
(Mexico) Marcelo Lara	1	7	7	3	3
(United Kingdom) John Feaver	6	5	5	6	6
(Italy) Corrado Barazzutti	5	3	2
2	(Australia) Ken Rosewall	7	6	6

Second round
(United States) F McNair	3	8	6
(Australia) R Case	6	9	8
(Argentina) J Ganzábal	3	2	4
16	(Australia) A Roche	6	6	6
Q	(Venezuela) H Hose	6	3	6	4
(Sweden) B Andersson	4	6	8	6
(United Kingdom) J Feaver	4	4	4
2	(Australia) K Rosewall	6	6	6

Third round
(Australia) R Case	2	0	3
16	(Australia) A Roche	6	6	6
(Sweden) B Andersson	2	2	2
2	(Australia) K Rosewall	6	6	6

Fourth round
16	(Australia) A Roche	6	6	8	6
2	(Australia) K Rosewall	3	8	6	1

Preceded by 1975 French Open	Grand Slams; Men's singles	Succeeded by 1975 U.S. Open
