= 1976 Wimbledon Championships – Men's doubles =

Men's doubles
- 1976 Wimbledon Championships

Final
- Champions: (United States) Brian Gottfried (Mexico) Raúl Ramírez
- Runners-up: (Australia) Ross Case (Australia) Geoff Masters
- Score: 3–6, 6–3, 8–6, 2–6, 7–5

Details
- Draw: 64 (5 Q )
- Seeds: 8

Events
Singles	men	women		boys	girls
Doubles	men	women	mixed	boys	girls
← 1975 ·	Wimbledon Championships	· 1977 →

Vitas Gerulaitis and Sandy Mayer were the defending champions, but lost in the quarterfinals to Ross Case and Geoff Masters.

Brian Gottfried and Raúl Ramírez defeated Case and Masters in the final, 3–6, 6–3, 8–6, 2–6, 7–5 to win the gentlemen's doubles title at the 1976 Wimbledon Championships. This was Gottfried and Ramírez' first and only Wimbledon title, and second Grand Slam overall.

== Seeds ==
1. (United States) Brian Gottfried / (Mexico) Raúl Ramírez (champions)
2. (United States) Jimmy Connors / (Romania) Ilie Năstase (second round)
3. (South Africa) Bob Hewitt / (South Africa) Frew McMillan (first round)
4. (Netherlands) Tom Okker / (United States) Marty Riessen (second round)
5. (United States) Bob Lutz / (United States) Stan Smith (semifinals)
6. (United States) Vitas Gerulaitis / (United States) Sandy Mayer (quarterfinals)
7. (Poland) Wojciech Fibak / (West Germany) Karl Meiler (quarterfinals)
8. (United States) Fred McNair / (United States) Sherwood Stewart (first round)

Click on the seed number of a player to go to their draw section.

== Draw ==
=== Key ===
- Q = Qualifier
- WC = Wild card
- LL = Lucky loser
- Alt = Alternate
- ITF = ITF entry
- PR = Protected ranking
- SR = Special ranking
- SE = Special exempt
- JE = Junior exempt
- JR = Junior Accelerator Programme entrant
- CO = College Accelerator Programme entrant
- NG = Next Gen Accelerator Program entrant
- w/o = Walkover
- r = Retired
- d = Defaulted

=== Finals ===
Quarterfinals
1	(United States) Brian Gottfried (Mexico) Raúl Ramírez	6	6	3	6
7	(Poland) Wojciech Fibak (West Germany) Karl Meiler	4	4	6	2
(India) Anand Amritraj (India) Vijay Amritraj	6	3	6	3	6
(United States) Mike Estep (United States) Tom Gorman	3	6	3	6	4
6	(United States) Vitas Gerulaitis (United States) Sandy Mayer	6	6	8	3	1
(Australia) Ross Case (Australia) Geoff Masters	3	4	9	6	6
5	(United States) Bob Lutz (United States) Stan Smith	6	6	6
(Australia) Syd Ball (Socialist Federal Republic of Yugoslavia) Niki Pilić	3	1	3

Semifinals
1	(United States) Brian Gottfried (Mexico) Raúl Ramírez	6	7	8
(India) Anand Amritraj (India) Vijay Amritraj	3	5	6
(Australia) Ross Case (Australia) Geoff Masters	6	6	6
5	(United States) Bob Lutz (United States) Stan Smith	4	3	4

Final
1	(United States) Brian Gottfried (Mexico) Raúl Ramírez	3	6	8	2	7
(Australia) Ross Case (Australia) Geoff Masters	6	3	6	6	5

=== Top half ===
==== Section 1 ====
First round
1	(United States) B Gottfried (Mexico) R Ramírez	7	8	9	6	6
(Australia) J Newcombe (Australia) A Roche	9	9	7	3	4
LL	(South Africa) M Myburg (United States) R Van't Hof	6	6	6
(Australia) M Edmondson (Australia) J Marks	1	3	0
(United States) J Borowiak (Pakistan) H Rahim	6	3	6	6
LL	(Australia) P Campbell (United States) L Parker	4	6	1	4
(Colombia) I Molina (Hungary) B Taróczy	3	1^{r}
(Soviet Union) A Metreveli (Soviet Union) K Pugaev	6	3
7	(Poland) W Fibak (West Germany) K Meiler	6	8	7	6
(Chile) P Cornejo (Chile) J Fillol	3	9	5	3
(France) É Deblicker (United States) T Gullikson	6	6	5	6
(United States) R Dell (United States) W Martin	4	3	7	4
(South Africa) R Moore (United States) E van Dillen	6	8	6	4
(United States) J Delaney (India) S Menon	4	9	8	6
Q	(United States) P Fleming (United States) B Teacher	8	9	6	3	4
(France) F Jauffret (France) P Proisy	9	8	4	6	6

Second round
1	(United States) B Gottfried (Mexico) R Ramírez	3	6	6	6
(Australia) M Edmondson (Australia) J Marks	6	3	4	4
(United States) J Borowiak (Pakistan) H Rahim	8	5	6	3	6
(Soviet Union) A Metreveli (Soviet Union) K Pugaev	6	7	2	6	3
7	(Poland) W Fibak (West Germany) K Meiler	6	6	6
(France) É Deblicker (United States) T Gullikson	3	2	3
(United States) J Delaney (India) S Menon	6	7	7
(France) F Jauffret (France) P Proisy	3	5	5

Third round
1	(United States) B Gottfried (Mexico) R Ramírez	8	6	8
(United States) J Borowiak (Pakistan) H Rahim	6	1	6
7	(Poland) W Fibak (West Germany) K Meiler	6	4	4	6	8
(United States) J Delaney (India) S Menon	4	6	6	3	6

Quarterfinals
1	(United States) B Gottfried (Mexico) R Ramírez	6	6	3	6
7	(Poland) W Fibak (West Germany) K Meiler	4	4	6	2

==== Section 2 ====
First round
3	(South Africa) R Hewitt (South Africa) F McMillan	8	4	6	3
(India) A Amritraj (India) V Amritraj	9	6	3	6
(Socialist Federal Republic of Yugoslavia) Ž Franulović (New Zealand) O Parun	8	6	8	6
(Venezuela) J Andrew (Bolivia) R Benavides	9	4	6	4
Q	(New Zealand) P Langsford (Brazil) J Soares	7	8	3
(Australia) P Dent (Rhodesia) A Pattison	9	9	6
(United Kingdom) G Battrick (United Kingdom) J Feaver	7	6	3	7
(United States) J McManus (United States) A Neely	5	2	6	5
8	(United States) F McNair (United States) S Stewart	4	5	6	6	3
(Egypt) I El Shafei (New Zealand) B Fairlie	6	7	3	4	6
Q	(France) J-B Chanfreau (United States) W Redondo	5	4	4
(United States) M Estep (United States) T Gorman	7	6	6
(Rhodesia) C Dowdeswell (Australia) A Stone	6	3	6	6
Q	(United Kingdom) M Farrell (United Kingdom) S Warboys	3	6	2	4
(United States) G Reid (Netherlands) R Thung	7	9	6	4	4
(United States) V Amaya (United States) G Hardie	9	7	3	6	6

Second round
(India) A Amritraj (India) V Amritraj	6	6	6
(Socialist Federal Republic of Yugoslavia) Ž Franulović (New Zealand) O Parun	3	4	2
(Australia) P Dent (Rhodesia) A Pattison	6	6	9	8
(United Kingdom) G Battrick (United Kingdom) J Feaver	8	4	7	6
(Egypt) I El Shafei (New Zealand) B Fairlie	6	6	7	3
(United States) M Estep (United States) T Gorman	8	3	9	6
(Rhodesia) C Dowdeswell (Australia) A Stone	6	7	9
(United States) V Amaya (United States) G Hardie	4	5	8

Third round
(India) A Amritraj (India) V Amritraj	6	6	6
(Australia) P Dent (Rhodesia) A Pattison	3	4	4
(United States) M Estep (United States) T Gorman	6	5	3	6	14
(Rhodesia) C Dowdeswell (Australia) A Stone	4	7	6	4	12

Quarterfinals
(India) A Amritraj (India) V Amritraj	6	3	6	3	6
(United States) M Estep (United States) T Gorman	3	6	3	6	4

=== Bottom half ===
==== Section 3 ====
First round
(United Kingdom) R Drysdale (United Kingdom) J Smith	8	6	6
LL	(Australia) B Drewett (Australia) P McNamara	6	1	2
(United Kingdom) R Lewis (United Kingdom) M Robinson	6	9	6
(United States) N Holmes (Australia) B Phillips-Moore	3	8	4
(United States) R Stockton (United States) R Tanner	8	2	3
LL	(Mexico) R Chávez (Mexico) E Montaño	9	6	6
Q	(United States) E Mayer (United States) E Scott	w/o
6	(United States) V Gerulaitis (United States) A Mayer
(United States) A Ashe (United States) C Pasarell	6	3	4	6	3
(Australia) R Crealy (Australia) K Warwick	3	6	6	3	6
(Sweden) B Borg (Argentina) G Vilas	6	2
(Australia) P Kronk (Socialist Federal Republic of Yugoslavia) N Špear	4	3^{r}
(Australia) R Case (Australia) G Masters	9	6	8	6
(France) J-F Caujolle (France) G Goven	8	3	9	1
(Argentina) J Ganzábal (Brazil) C Kirmayr	4	2	2
4	(Netherlands) T Okker (United States) M Riessen	6	6	6

Second round
(United Kingdom) R Drysdale (United Kingdom) J Smith	2	4	6	8	6
(United Kingdom) R Lewis (United Kingdom) M Robinson	6	6	3	6	4
LL	(Mexico) R Chávez (Mexico) E Montaño	4	4	2
6	(United States) V Gerulaitis (United States) A Mayer	6	6	6
(Australia) R Crealy (Australia) K Warwick	4	2	3
(Sweden) B Borg (Argentina) G Vilas	6	6	6
(Australia) R Case (Australia) G Masters	6	8	6
4	(Netherlands) T Okker (United States) M Riessen	4	6	3

Third round
(United Kingdom) R Drysdale (United Kingdom) J Smith	4	1	9	2
6	(United States) V Gerulaitis (United States) A Mayer	6	6	8	6
(Sweden) B Borg (Argentina) G Vilas	w/o
(Australia) R Case (Australia) G Masters

Quarterfinals
6	(United States) V Gerulaitis (United States) A Mayer	6	6	8	3	1
(Australia) R Case (Australia) G Masters	3	4	9	6	6

==== Section 4 ====
First round
(Australia) R Carmichael (Australia) R Ruffels	7	6	4	6	6
(Australia) N Fraser (Australia) L Hoad	9	2	6	3	3
(Italy) A Panatta (Romania) I Țiriac	8	6	3	7	6
(United Kingdom) M Cox (South Africa) C Drysdale	9	3	6	5	3
(Argentina) E Álvarez (Paraguay) V Pecci	5	6	6	5	6
(Argentina) R Cano (Chile) B Prajoux	7	4	4	7	4
(United Kingdom) D Lloyd (United Kingdom) J Lloyd	6	1	5	4
5	(United States) R Lutz (United States) S Smith	4	6	7	6
(West Germany) J Fassbender (West Germany) H-J Pohmann	0	4	8
(South Africa) B Bertram (South Africa) B Mitton	6	6	9
(Australia) E Ewert (Australia) C Kachel
(United Kingdom) C Mottram (United Kingdom) R Taylor	w/o
(United States) J Andrews (Australia) C Dibley	6	4	7	8
(Australia) S Ball (Socialist Federal Republic of Yugoslavia) N Pilić	3	6	9	9
(United States) M Cahill (United States) J Whitlinger	4	6	6	0	2
2	(United States) J Connors (Romania) I Năstase	6	4	2	6	6

Second round
(Australia) R Carmichael (Australia) R Ruffels	4	9	3	4
(Italy) A Panatta (Romania) I Țiriac	6	8	6	6
(Argentina) L Álvarez (Paraguay) V Pecci	1	4	4
5	(United States) R Lutz (United States) S Smith	6	6	6
(South Africa) B Bertram (South Africa) B Mitton	6	3	6	6
(Australia) E Ewert (Australia) C Kachel	3	6	3	2
(Australia) S Ball (Socialist Federal Republic of Yugoslavia) N Pilić	9	7	2	1	11
2	(United States) J Connors (Romania) I Năstase	8	5	6	6	9

Third round
(Italy) A Panatta (Romania) I Țiriac	3	7	8
5	(United States) R Lutz (United States) S Smith	6	9	9
(South Africa) B Bertram (South Africa) B Mitton	4	6	3	7	4
(Australia) S Ball (Socialist Federal Republic of Yugoslavia) N Pilić	6	3	6	5	6

Quarterfinals
5	(United States) R Lutz (United States) S Smith	6	6	6
(Australia) S Ball (Socialist Federal Republic of Yugoslavia) N Pilić	3	1	3
