= 1976 Wimbledon Championships – Men's singles =

Men's singles
- 1976 Wimbledon Championships
- 1975 Champion: (United States) Arthur Ashe

Final
- Champion: (Sweden) Björn Borg
- Runner-up: (Romania) Ilie Năstase
- Score: 6–4, 6–2, 9–7

Details
- Draw: 128 (16 Q )
- Seeds: 16

Events
Singles	men	women		boys	girls
Doubles	men	women	mixed	boys	girls
← 1975 ·	Wimbledon Championships	· 1977 →

Björn Borg defeated Ilie Năstase in the final, 6–4, 6–2, 9–7 to win the gentlemen's singles tennis title at the 1976 Wimbledon Championships. It was the first of his five consecutive Wimbledon titles, and his third major title overall. Borg did not lose a set during the tournament, the first man in the Open Era to do so.

Arthur Ashe was the defending champion, but lost in the fourth round to Vitas Gerulaitis.

== Seeds ==
1. (United States) Arthur Ashe (fourth round)
2. (United States) Jimmy Connors (quarterfinals)
3. (Romania) Ilie Năstase (final)
4. (Sweden) Björn Borg (champion)
5. (Italy) Adriano Panatta (third round)
6. (Argentina) Guillermo Vilas (quarterfinals)
7. (United States) Roscoe Tanner (semifinals)
8. (Mexico) Raúl Ramírez (semifinals)
9. (Netherlands) Tom Okker (third round)
10. (Australia) John Newcombe (third round)
11. (United States) Eddie Dibbs (withdrew)
12. (Australia) Tony Roche (fourth round)
13. (Chile) Jaime Fillol (third round)
14. (United States) Brian Gottfried (fourth round)
15. (Czechoslovakia) Jan Kodeš (withdrew )
16. (United States) Stan Smith (fourth round)

Click on the seed number of a player to go to their draw section.

Eddie Dibbs and Jan Kodeš withdrew due to injury. They were replaced in the draw by lucky losers John Holladay and Milan Holeček respectively.

== Draw ==
=== Key ===
- Q = Qualifier
- WC = Wild card
- LL = Lucky loser
- Alt = Alternate
- ITF = ITF entry
- PR = Protected ranking
- SR = Special ranking
- SE = Special exempt
- JE = Junior exempt
- JR = Junior Accelerator Programme entrant
- CO = College Accelerator Programme entrant
- NG = Next Gen Accelerator Program entrant
- w/o = Walkover
- r = Retired
- d = Defaulted

=== Finals ===
Quarterfinals
(United States) Vitas Gerulaitis	6	4	2	4
8	(Mexico) Raúl Ramírez	4	6	6	6
3	(Romania) Ilie Năstase	6	6	6
(United States) Charlie Pasarell	4	2	3
6	(Argentina) Guillermo Vilas	3	0	2
4	(Sweden) Björn Borg	6	6	6
7	(United States) Roscoe Tanner	6	6	8
2	(United States) Jimmy Connors	4	2	6

Semifinals
8	(Mexico) Raúl Ramírez	2	7	3
3	(Romania) Ilie Năstase	6	9	6
4	(Sweden) Björn Borg	6	9^{7}	6
7	(United States) Roscoe Tanner	4	8^{1}	4

Final
3	(Romania) Ilie Năstase	4	2	7
4	(Sweden) Björn Borg	6	6	9

=== Top half ===
==== Section 1 ====
First round
1	(United States) Arthur Ashe	7	6	7
(United States) Ferdi Taygan	5	4	5
Q	(South Africa) John Yuill	4	6	1	3
(Australia) Allan Stone	6	4	6	6
(South Africa) Ray Moore	5	6	9	5	2
(Australia) Mark Edmondson	7	4	8	7	6
Q	(India) Jayakumar Royappa	4	2	4
Q	(United Kingdom) Mark Farrell	6	6	6
LL	(Czechoslovakia) Milan Holeček	5	1	5
(United States) Vitas Gerulaitis	7	6	7
(United Kingdom) Mark Cox	6	9	6
(Spain) Antonio Muñoz	4	8	4
(United States) Billy Martin	7	6	8	6
(United States) Sherwood Stewart	9	2	6	4
(Rhodesia) Colin Dowdeswell	6	3	2	6
(United States) Steve Krulevitz	3	6	6	8

Second round
1	(United States) A Ashe	7	8	9	7
(Australia) A Stone	5	9	7	5
(Australia) M Edmondson	9	9	6
Q	(United Kingdom) M Farrell	8	7	4
(United States) V Gerulaitis	6	6	6
(United Kingdom) M Cox	3	4	4
(United States) W Martin	2	3	6	8
(United States) S Krulevitz	6	6	4	9

Third round
1	(United States) A Ashe	7	6	8
(Australia) M Edmondson	5	2	6
(United States) V Gerulaitis	6	6	6
(United States) S Krulevitz	2	2	1

Fourth round
1	(United States) A Ashe	6	9	4	3	4
(United States) V Gerulaitis	4	8	6	6	6

==== Section 2 ====
First round
8	(Mexico) Raúl Ramírez	6	6	9
Q	(Australia) Chris Kachel	3	4	8
(United States) Norman Holmes	3	4	6	0
(United Kingdom) Michael Wayman	6	6	3	6
(West Germany) Karl Meiler	6	9	3	6	6
(United States) Mike Cahill	8	7	6	3	4
(Australia) Ray Ruffels	9	6	6
(United States) Jim McManus	7	1	1
10	(Australia) John Newcombe	8	9	6	6
Q	(United States) James "Chico" Hagey	9	8	4	1
(United Kingdom) John Feaver	6	1	6	7
(United States) Henry Bunis	1	6	2	5
(South Africa) Bernard Mitton	7	6	1	6
(France) Éric Deblicker	5	2	6	4
(India) Sashi Menon	5	6	9	2	10
(United Kingdom) Roger Taylor	7	2	8	6	8

Second round
8	(Mexico) R Ramírez	6	8	6	6
(United Kingdom) M Wayman	4	9	4	3
(West Germany) K Meiler	6	6	6	8	8
(Australia) R Ruffels	8	2	4	9	6
10	(Australia) J Newcombe	6	3	8	6	6
(United Kingdom) J Feaver	3	6	9	4	4
(South Africa) B Mitton	8	6	6
(India) S Menon	6	2	1

Third round
8	(Mexico) R Ramírez	6	7	6
(West Germany) K Meiler	2	5	1
10	(Australia) J Newcombe	6	3	8	8
(South Africa) B Mitton	3	6	9	9

Fourth round
8	(Mexico) R Ramírez	9	3	6	6
(South Africa) B Mitton	8	6	1	1

==== Section 3 ====
First round
3	(Romania) Ilie Năstase	6	6	6
(Socialist Federal Republic of Yugoslavia) Nikola Špear	2	3	2
(Argentina) Lito Álvarez	2	4	2
(Socialist Federal Republic of Yugoslavia) Željko Franulović	6	6	6
(New Zealand) Brian Fairlie	4	2	0
(Australia) Geoff Masters	6	6	6
(Australia) Kim Warwick	6	6	6
(Argentina) Ricardo Cano	4	2	1
13	(Chile) Jaime Fillol	6	6	6
LL	(Netherlands) Rolf Thung	1	2	3
Q	(Australia) Paul McNamee	3	8	2
(Australia) Ross Case	6	9	6
(New Zealand) Chris Lewis	8	3	7	0
(Czechoslovakia) Jiří Hřebec	6	6	5	0^{r}
(Australia) John Alexander	6	8	7	6	6
(New Zealand) Onny Parun	2	9	9	1	8

Second round
3	(Romania) I Năstase	6	7	6
(Socialist Federal Republic of Yugoslavia) Ž Franulović	1	5	3
(Australia) G Masters	5	4	4
(Australia) K Warwick	7	6	6
13	(Chile) J Fillol	8	6	6	9	6
(Australia) R Case	9	4	8	8	2
(New Zealand) C Lewis	3	4	2
(New Zealand) O Parun	6	6	6

Third round
3	(Romania) I Năstase	8	7	6
(Australia) K Warwick	6	5	4
13	(Chile) J Fillol	5	4	4
(New Zealand) O Parun	7	6	6

Fourth round
3	(Romania) I Năstase	7	6	6
(New Zealand) O Parun	5	4	3

==== Section 4 ====
First round
5	(Italy) Adriano Panatta	4	6	7	6
(Venezuela) Jorge Andrew	6	4	5	4
Q	(Australia) Dale Collings	4	7	2
(South Africa) Bob Hewitt	6	5	0^{r}
(France) François Jauffret	8	3	4
(India) Vijay Amritraj	9	6	6
(Japan) Jun Kamiwazumi	3	1	3
(United States) Charlie Pasarell	6	6	6
9	(Netherlands) Tom Okker	6	6	6
(United States) Sandy Mayer	3	2	4
(Argentina) Julián Ganzábal	3	4	4
(United States) Victor Amaya	6	6	6
(United States) Erik van Dillen	3	6	5	3
(Rhodesia) Andrew Pattison	6	3	7	6
(Australia) Phil Dent	4	5	6	9	7
(United Kingdom) John Lloyd	6	7	3	8	5

Second round
5	(Italy) A Panatta	9	2	3	8	6
Q	(Australia) D Collings	7	6	6	6	1
(India) V Amritraj	4	2	4
(United States) C Pasarell	6	6	6
9	(Netherlands) T Okker	9	6	6
(United States) V Amaya	7	2	3
(Rhodesia) A Pattison	2	2	5
(Australia) P Dent	6	6	7

Third round
5	(Italy) A Panatta	9	6	4	5	4
(United States) C Pasarell	8	4	6	7	6
9	(Netherlands) T Okker	4	8	4
(Australia) P Dent	6	9	6

Fourth round
(United States) C Pasarell	2	4	6	6	7
(Australia) P Dent	6	6	4	0	5

=== Bottom half ===
==== Section 5 ====
First round
(Poland) Wojciech Fibak	8	6	3	6
(United States) John Whitlinger	6	1	6	1
(Austria) Hans Kary	8	1	4	9	4
(West Germany) Ulrich Pinner	6	6	6	7	6
Q	(United States) Raz Reid	6	5	6	6
(Colombia) Iván Molina	4	7	3	4
(Australia) Syd Ball	8	8	4
12	(Australia) Tony Roche	9	9	6
Q	(United States) Gene Mayer	2	0^{r}
(Soviet Union) Alex Metreveli	6	5
Q	(Australia) Bill Lloyd	3	4	3
(United States) Dick Stockton	6	6	6
(France) Georges Goven	5	2	4
(Pakistan) Haroon Rahim	7	6	6
(Australia) Barry Phillips-Moore	3	1	4
6	(Argentina) Guillermo Vilas	6	6	6

Second round
(Poland) W Fibak	3	8	3
(West Germany) U Pinner	6	9	6
Q	(United States) G Reid	4	2	4
12	(Australia) A Roche	6	6	6
(Soviet Union) A Metreveli	6	6	6	3	11
(United States) R Stockton	8	3	3	6	9
(Pakistan) H Rahim	7	3	4
6	(Argentina) G Vilas	9	6	6

Third round
(West Germany) U Pinner	4	6	2	1
12	(Australia) A Roche	6	3	6	6
(Soviet Union) A Metreveli	6	5	2	4
6	(Argentina) G Vilas	2	7	6	6

Fourth round
12	(Australia) A Roche	4	6	7	3	4
6	(Argentina) G Vilas	6	3	5	6	6

==== Section 6 ====
First round
(United States) Mike Estep	9	2	4	7
(United States) Tom Gorman	7	6	6	9
(United States) Jeff Borowiak	6	4	4	4
(United States) Bob Lutz	4	6	6	6
Q	(New Zealand) Russell Simpson	5	4	4
(United States) John Andrews	7	6	6
(United States) Tim Gullikson	6	3	2	7
14	(United States) Brian Gottfried	4	6	6	9
(West Germany) Jürgen Fassbender	2	6	8	3	3
(United States) James Delaney	6	3	6	6	6
(Australia) Colin Dibley	6	6	6
(Australia) Paul Kronk	2	3	2
(South Africa) Frew McMillan	3	3	6
(United States) Marty Riessen	6	6	8
(United Kingdom) David Lloyd	3	3	1
4	(Sweden) Björn Borg	6	6	6

Second round
(United States) T Gorman	1	9	3	6	4
(United States) R Lutz	6	8	6	2	6
(United States) J Andrews	6	9	6	4	2
14	(United States) B Gottfried	8	7	2	6	6
(United States) J Delaney	6	5	6
(Australia) C Dibley	8	7	8
(United States) M Riessen	2	2	4
4	(Sweden) B Borg	6	6	6

Third round
(United States) R Lutz	3	1	6	6	1
14	(United States) B Gottfried	6	6	3	4	6
(Australia) C Dibley	4	4	4
4	(Sweden) B Borg	6	6	6

Fourth round
14	(United States) B Gottfried	2	2	5
4	(Sweden) B Borg	6	6	7

==== Section 7 ====
First round
(South Africa) Byron Bertram	2	5	2
(Socialist Federal Republic of Yugoslavia) Nikola Pilić	6	7	6
(Paraguay) Víctor Pecci	6	6	6
(South Africa) Pat Cramer	3	3	4
(United Kingdom) Richard Lewis	6	2	6	1	8
(France) Patrick Proisy	4	6	2	6	6
(United States) Brian Teacher	9	3	9	6
LL	(United States) John Holladay	7	6	8	4
(United Kingdom) Jonathan Smith	3	7	7	2
(Brazil) Carlos Alberto Kirmayr	6	9	5	6
(United Kingdom) Buster Mottram	8	1	0^{r}
(West Germany) Hans-Jürgen Pohmann	9	6	0
Q	(Japan) Kenichi Hirai	6	6	6
Q	(Soviet Union) Vadim Borisov	3	4	0
(United Kingdom) Martin Robinson	6	5	4
7	(United States) Roscoe Tanner	8	7	6

Second round
(Socialist Federal Republic of Yugoslavia) N Pilić	8	9	6	5	6
(Paraguay) V Pecci	9	8	3	7	4
(United Kingdom) R Lewis	3	9	9	9
(United States) B Teacher	6	7	8	8
(Brazil) C Kirmayr	8	6	6
(West Germany) H-J Pohmann	6	3	3
Q	(Japan) K Hirai	3	4	7
7	(United States) R Tanner	6	6	9

Third round
(Socialist Federal Republic of Yugoslavia) N Pilić	3	6	6	6
(United Kingdom) R Lewis	6	4	3	3
(Brazil) C Kirmayr	9	8	3	2
7	(United States) R Tanner	8	9	6	6

Fourth round
(Socialist Federal Republic of Yugoslavia) N Pilić	3	4	4
7	(United States) R Tanner	6	6	6

==== Section 8 ====
First round
Q	(Soviet Union) Teimuraz Kakulia	6	9	6
(Hungary) Balázs Taróczy	1	8	2
(United Kingdom) Robin Drysdale	2	3	4
(South Africa) Cliff Drysdale	6	6	6
(United Kingdom) Gerald Battrick	6	6	7
(West Germany) Hans-Joachim Plötz	3	3	5
(Chile) Patricio Cornejo	1	2	4
16	(United States) Stan Smith	6	6	6
(Australia) Dick Crealy	6	2	1	6	5
(Australia) Bob Carmichael	4	6	6	4	7
(Egypt) Ismail El Shafei	9	6	6
(France) Jean-François Caujolle	8	3	4
Q	(United Kingdom) Stephen Warboys	5	7	3	6	6
Q	(Australia) John Marks	7	5	6	4	3
(Italy) Antonio Zugarelli	1	3	2
2	(United States) Jimmy Connors	6	6	6

Second round
Q	(Soviet Union) T Kakulia	6	6	6
(South Africa) C Drysdale	1	3	4
(United Kingdom) G Battrick	0	8	2	3
16	(United States) S Smith	6	6	6	6
(Australia) R Carmichael	6	4	4
(Egypt) I El Shafei	8	6	6
Q	(United Kingdom) S Warboys	3	2	3
2	(United States) J Connors	6	6	6

Third round
Q	(Soviet Union) T Kakulia	6	6	1	1
16	(United States) S Smith	8	3	6	6
(Egypt) I El Shafei	4	0	3
2	(United States) J Connors	6	6	6

Fourth round
16	(United States) S Smith	4	1	3
2	(United States) J Connors	6	6	6

Preceded by 1976 French Open	Grand Slams; Men's singles	Succeeded by 1976 U.S. Open
