= 1975 Wimbledon Championships – Men's doubles =

Men's doubles
- 1975 Wimbledon Championships

Final
- Champions: (United States) Vitas Gerulaitis (United States) Sandy Mayer
- Runners-up: (Rhodesia) Colin Dowdeswell (Australia) Allan Stone
- Score: 7–5, 8–6, 6–4

Details
- Draw: 64 (8 Q )
- Seeds: 8

Events
Singles	men	women		boys	girls
Doubles	men	women	mixed	boys	girls
← 1974 ·	Wimbledon Championships	· 1976 →

John Newcombe and Tony Roche were the defending champions, but Newcombe did not compete. Roche partnered with Colin Dibley but lost in the quarterfinals to Dick Crealy and Nikola Pilić.

Vitas Gerulaitis and Sandy Mayer defeated Colin Dowdeswell and Allan Stone in the final, 7–5, 8–6, 6–4 to win the gentlemen's doubles title at the 1975 Wimbledon Championships.

== Seeds ==
1. (United States) Brian Gottfried / (Mexico) Raúl Ramírez (second round)
2. (United States) Jimmy Connors / (Romania) Ilie Năstase (second round)
3. (South Africa) Bob Hewitt / (South Africa) Frew McMillan (quarterfinals)
4. (United States) Bob Lutz / (United States) Stan Smith (third round)
5. (Australia) John Alexander / (Australia) Phil Dent (second round)
6. (United Kingdom) Mark Cox / (United Kingdom) Roger Taylor (third round)
7. (Netherlands) Tom Okker / (United States) Marty Riessen (third round)
8. (United States) Arthur Ashe / (United States) Erik van Dillen (second round)

Click on the seed number of a player to go to their draw section.

== Draw ==
=== Key ===
- Q = Qualifier
- WC = Wild card
- LL = Lucky loser
- Alt = Alternate
- ITF = ITF entry
- PR = Protected ranking
- SR = Special ranking
- SE = Special exempt
- JE = Junior exempt
- JR = Junior Accelerator Programme entrant
- CO = College Accelerator Programme entrant
- NG = Next Gen Accelerator Program entrant
- w/o = Walkover
- r = Retired
- d = Defaulted

=== Finals ===
Quarterfinals
(United States) Vitas Gerulaitis (United States) Sandy Mayer	6	6	6
(United Kingdom) Gerald Battrick (United Kingdom) Graham Stilwell	4	4	2
(West Germany) Jürgen Fassbender (West Germany) Hans-Jürgen Pohmann	5	6	6	9
(Australia) Ross Case (Australia) Geoff Masters	7	2	1	8
(Rhodesia) Colin Dowdeswell (Australia) Allan Stone	6	6	8	9
3	(South Africa) Bob Hewitt (South Africa) Frew McMillan	3	4	9	8
(Australia) Colin Dibley (Australia) Tony Roche	4	4	4
(Australia) Dick Crealy (Socialist Federal Republic of Yugoslavia) Nikola Pilić	6	6	6

Semifinals
(United States) Vitas Gerulaitis (United States) Sandy Mayer	8	3	6	6	6
(West Germany) Jürgen Fassbender (West Germany) Hans-Jürgen Pohmann	9	6	3	3	3
(Rhodesia) Colin Dowdeswell (Australia) Allan Stone	9	3	4	9	6
(Australia) Dick Crealy (Socialist Federal Republic of Yugoslavia) Nikola Pilić	8	6	6	8	3

Final
(United States) Vitas Gerulaitis (United States) Sandy Mayer	7	8	6
(Rhodesia) Colin Dowdeswell (Australia) Allan Stone	5	6	4

=== Top half ===
==== Section 1 ====
First round
1	(United States) B Gottfried (Mexico) R Ramírez	6	6	6
Q	(Australia) M Edmondson (Australia) S Wright	4	2	2
(United States) C Pasarell (United States) R Tanner	6	6	6
(United Kingdom) J Feaver (United Kingdom) J Paish	4	2	4
(United Kingdom) D Lloyd (United Kingdom) S Warboys	6	6	2	3	6
(United States) S Krulevitz (United States) T Waltke	3	4	6	6	2
(New Zealand) A Parun (New Zealand) O Parun	w/o
(United States) V Gerulaitis (United States) A Mayer
8	(United States) A Ashe (United States) E van Dillen	6	3	6	6
(United States) W Brown (Socialist Federal Republic of Yugoslavia) N Špear	3	6	2	3
(Italy) A Panatta (Romania) I Țiriac	8	6	6
(Chile) P Cornejo (Chile) J Fillol	6	3	1
(United Kingdom) G Battrick (United Kingdom) G Stilwell	9	1	7	9
(Venezuela) H Hose (Netherlands) R Thung	8	6	5	8
(Venezuela) J Andrew (Czechoslovakia) J Písecký	9	4	6	6
(France) P Dominguez (France) G Goven	8	6	3	4

Second round
1	(United States) B Gottfried (Mexico) R Ramírez	2	3	5
(United States) C Pasarell (United States) R Tanner	6	6	7
(United Kingdom) D Lloyd (United Kingdom) S Warboys	4	9	4	4
(United States) V Gerulaitis (United States) A Mayer	6	8	6	6
8	(United States) A Ashe (United States) E van Dillen	6	4	5
(Italy) A Panatta (Romania) I Țiriac	8	6	7
(United Kingdom) G Battrick (United Kingdom) G Stilwell	6	6	6
(Venezuela) J Andrew (Czechoslovakia) J Písecký	4	4	4

Third round
(United States) C Pasarell (United States) R Tanner	6	9	5	4
(United States) V Gerulaitis (United States) A Mayer	8	8	7	6
(Italy) A Panatta (Romania) I Țiriac	4	6	6	2	3
(United Kingdom) G Battrick (United Kingdom) G Stilwell	6	2	4	6	6

Quarterfinals
(United States) V Gerulaitis (United States) A Mayer	6	6	6
(United Kingdom) G Battrick (United Kingdom) G Stilwell	4	4	2

==== Section 2 ====
First round
4	(United States) R Lutz (United States) S Smith	6	6	6
(United States) R Fisher (United States) R Kreiss	4	2	3
LL	(Australia) P Doerner (Australia) J James	5	6	8	6	3
(United States) M Estep (Australia) K Warwick	7	3	9	4	6
Q	(United States) J Fort (United States) A Neely	8	4	4
(South Africa) R Moore (Rhodesia) A Pattison	9	6	6
(West Germany) J Fassbender (West Germany) H-J Pohmann
(Sweden) B Andersson (Sweden) T Svensson	w/o
5	(Australia) J Alexander (Australia) P Dent	4	8	6	7	6
(Australia) S Ball (Australia) R Carmichael	6	6	8	5	4
(Brazil) JE Mandarino (Argentina) M Vázquez	5	3	4
(Czechoslovakia) M Holeček (West Germany) K Meiler	7	6	6
(Australia) R Case (Australia) G Masters	3	6	7	7
(South Africa) P Cramer (Austria) H Kary	6	1	5	5
(India) A Amritraj (India) V Amritraj	8	4	9	6
(South Africa) B Bertram (South Africa) J Yuill	6	6	8	1

Second round
4	(United States) R Lutz (United States) S Smith	6	8	9	8
(United States) M Estep (Australia) K Warwick	2	9	8	6
(South Africa) R Moore (Rhodesia) A Pattison	2	5	6	4
(West Germany) J Fassbender (West Germany) H-J Pohmann	6	7	4	6
5	(Australia) J Alexander (Australia) P Dent	3	9	4	4
(Czechoslovakia) M Holeček (West Germany) K Meiler	6	8	6	6
(Australia) R Case (Australia) G Masters	8	4	3	6	6
(India) A Amritraj (India) V Amritraj	6	6	6	1	3

Third round
4	(United States) R Lutz (United States) S Smith	9	8	3	5
(West Germany) J Fassbender (West Germany) H-J Pohmann	7	9	6	7
(Czechoslovakia) M Holeček (West Germany) K Meiler	1	6	7	3
(Australia) R Case (Australia) G Masters	6	8	5	6

Quarterfinals
(West Germany) J Fassbender (West Germany) H-J Pohmann	5	6	6	9
(Australia) R Case (Australia) G Masters	7	2	1	8

=== Bottom half ===
==== Section 3 ====
First round
(Soviet Union) T Kakulia (Soviet Union) A Metreveli	2	6	7	4	2
(Poland) W Fibak (United States) F McNair	6	4	5	6	6
(Rhodesia) C Dowdeswell (Australia) A Stone	6	8	8	6
Q	(Japan) K Hirai (Japan) T Sakai	3	6	9	2
(France) W N'Godrella (France) P Proisy	w/o
(Australia) John Bartlett (Japan) J Kuki
(United Kingdom) M Farrell (United Kingdom) J Lloyd	4	2	3
7	(Netherlands) T Okker (United States) M Riessen	6	6	6
Q	(South Africa) D Joubert (South Africa) B Mitton	6	4	6	2	3
(United States) R Dell (United States) S Stewart	3	6	2	6	6
(Australia) B Phillips-Moore (United States) E Scott	6	6	6
(France) J-F Caujolle (France) J-L Haillet	2	4	4
(Japan) J Kamiwazumi (Japan) Y Tezuka	5	6	7	6
(Greece) N Kelaidis (Belgium) B Mignot	7	4	5	4
(Argentina) E Álvarez (Argentina) J Ganzábal	3	3	5
3	(South Africa) R Hewitt (South Africa) F McMillan	6	6	7

Second round
(Poland) W Fibak (United States) F McNair	6	0	3	3
(Rhodesia) C Dowdeswell (Australia) A Stone	3	6	6	6
(Australia) John Bartlett (Japan) J Kuki	3	3	2
7	(Netherlands) T Okker (United States) M Riessen	6	6	6
(United States) R Dell (United States) S Stewart	6	6	6
(Australia) B Phillips-Moore (United States) E Scott	3	4	2
(Japan) J Kamiwazumi (Japan) Y Tezuka	2	4	2
3	(South Africa) R Hewitt (South Africa) F McMillan	6	6	6

Third round
(Rhodesia) C Dowdeswell (Australia) A Stone	3	9	6	6
7	(Netherlands) T Okker (United States) M Riessen	6	7	3	2
(United States) R Dell (United States) S Stewart	6	2	2	6	2
3	(South Africa) R Hewitt (South Africa) F McMillan	4	6	6	3	6

Quarterfinals
(Rhodesia) C Dowdeswell (Australia) A Stone	6	6	8	9
3	(South Africa) R Hewitt (South Africa) F McMillan	3	4	9	8

==== Section 4 ====
First round
(Australia) C Dibley (Australia) A Roche	6	3	9	6
(Czechoslovakia) J Hřebec (Czechoslovakia) J Kodeš	4	6	8	4
(United States) J Andrews (United States) M Machette	3	9	4	2
(United States) J Borowiak (United States) J McManus	6	8	6	6
(Egypt) I El Shafei (Brazil) T Koch	6	6	6
(Hungary) P Szőke (Hungary) B Taróczy	3	4	4
(Colombia) I Molina (Colombia) J Velasco	3	0	2
6	(United Kingdom) M Cox (United Kingdom) R Taylor	6	6	6
(Sweden) B Borg (Argentina) G Vilas	8	7	8	8
(United States) P Gerken (Pakistan) H Rahim	6	5	9	6
(United States) J Austin (United States) C Owens	6	9	6
LL	(France) J-B Chanfreau (Paraguay) V Pecci	0	8	4
(Australia) R Crealy (Socialist Federal Republic of Yugoslavia) N Pilić	3	6	6	6
Q	(United Kingdom) J Smith (United States) L Turville	6	3	4	4
(Mexico) M Lara (Mexico) J Loyo Mayo	4	7	2
2	(United States) J Connors (Romania) I Năstase	6	9	6

Second round
(Australia) C Dibley (Australia) A Roche	3	6	6	6
(United States) J Borowiak (United States) J McManus	6	3	4	4
(Egypt) I El Shafei (Brazil) T Koch	4	4	4
6	(United Kingdom) M Cox (United Kingdom) R Taylor	6	6	6
(Sweden) B Borg (Argentina) G Vilas	w/o
(United States) J Austin (United States) C Owens
(Australia) R Crealy (Socialist Federal Republic of Yugoslavia) N Pilić	9	4	6	6
2	(United States) J Connors (Romania) I Năstase	8	6	4	4

Third round
(Australia) C Dibley (Australia) A Roche	9	6	6
6	(United Kingdom) M Cox (United Kingdom) R Taylor	8	3	4
(United States) J Austin (United States) C Owens	6	4	6	5	11
(Australia) R Crealy (Socialist Federal Republic of Yugoslavia) N Pilić	3	6	3	7	13

Quarterfinals
(Australia) C Dibley (Australia) A Roche	4	4	4
(Australia) R Crealy (Socialist Federal Republic of Yugoslavia) N Pilić	6	6	6
