= Ben McKown =

American tennis player

- Country (sports): United States
- Born: January 11, 1957 (age 69) Lakeland, Florida
- Plays: Right-handed

Singles
- Career record: 4–9
- Highest ranking: No. 94 (Mar 30, 1981)

Grand Slam singles results
- French Open: 1R (1981)

Ben McKown (born January 11, 1957) is an American former professional tennis player.

McKown, a native of Lakeland, Florida, won the national junior clay court championships in 1974 and was a junior quarter-finalist at Wimbledon the following year. He played collegiate tennis for Trinity University (Texas) and in 1979 partnered with Erick Iskersky to claim the NCAA Division I doubles championship.

In the early 1980s he competed briefly on the professional tour and reached a best ranking of 94 in the world. He made a main draw appearance at the 1981 French Open, where he lost in the first round to Jean-François Caujolle.
