= Elizabeth Vlotman =

- Country (sports): South Africa
- Born: 9 November 1954 (age 71)

Singles

Grand Slam singles results
- Wimbledon: 2R (1976)

Doubles

Grand Slam doubles results
- Wimbledon: 3R (1975, 1976)

Grand Slam mixed doubles results
- Wimbledon: 2R (1975, 1976)

Elizabeth Vlotman (born Elizabeth Truter; 9 November 1954) is a South African former professional tennis player.

Active on tour in the 1970s, Vlotman featured twice in the singles main draw at Wimbledon. In 1975, she was beaten in the first round by Billie Jean King, then in 1976 she fell in the second round.

Vlotman, now settled in the United Kingdom, has worked as a teacher and in tennis promotion. She married retail tycoon Clive Vlotman (a Dixons executive and owner of Powerstore).
