= 1975 Wimbledon Championships =

- Date: 23 June – 5 July
- Edition: 89th
- Category: Grand Slam
- Draw: 128S / 64D
- Prize money: £114,875
- Surface: Grass
- Location: Church Road; SW19, Wimbledon, London, United Kingdom
- Venue: All England Lawn Tennis and Croquet Club

Champions

Men's singles
- (United States) Arthur Ashe

Women's singles
- (United States) Billie Jean King

Men's doubles
- (United States) Vitas Gerulaitis / (United States) Sandy Mayer

Women's doubles
- (United States) Ann Kiyomura / (Japan) Kazuko Sawamatsu

Mixed doubles
- (United States) Marty Riessen / (Australia) Margaret Court

Boys' singles
- (New Zealand) Chris Lewis

Girls' singles
- (Soviet Union) Natasha Chmyreva
- Wimbledon Championships

The 1975 Wimbledon Championships was a tennis tournament that took place on the outdoor grass courts at the All England Lawn Tennis and Croquet Club in Wimbledon, London, United Kingdom. The tournament was held from Monday 23 June until Saturday 5 July 1975. It was the 89th staging of the Wimbledon Championships, and the second Grand Slam tennis event of 1975. Arthur Ashe and Billie Jean King won the singles titles.

== Prize money ==
The total prize money for 1975 championships was £114,875. The winner of the men's title earned £10,000 while the women's singles champion earned £7,000.

Event	W	F	SF	QF	Round of 16	Round of 32	Round of 64	Round of 128
Men's singles	£10,000	£6,000	£2,000	£1,000	£600	£300	£200	£150
Women's singles	£7,000	£4,000	£1,500	£750	£500	£250	£175	£150
Men's doubles *	£2,000	£1,200	£800	£400	£200	£0	£0	—N/a
Women's doubles *	£1,200	£700	£400	£200	£100	£0	£0	—N/a
Mixed doubles *	£1,000	£500	£300	£200	£100	£0	£0	—N/a

_{* per team}

== Champions ==
=== Seniors ===
==== Men's singles ====
(United States) Arthur Ashe defeated (United States) Jimmy Connors, 6–1, 6–1, 5–7, 6–4

- It was Ashe's 3rd (and last) career Grand Slam title, and his 1st Wimbledon title.

==== Women's singles ====
(United States) Billie Jean King defeated (Australia) Evonne Goolagong Cawley, 6–0, 6–1

- It was King's 12th (and last) career Grand Slam title (her 8th in the Open Era), and her 6th Wimbledon title.

==== Men's doubles ====
(United States) Vitas Gerulaitis / (United States) Sandy Mayer defeated (Rhodesia) Colin Dowdeswell / (Australia) Allan Stone, 7–5, 8–6, 6–4

==== Women's doubles ====
(United States) Ann Kiyomura / (Japan) Kazuko Sawamatsu defeated (France) Françoise Dürr / (Netherlands) Betty Stöve, 7–5, 1–6, 7–5

==== Mixed doubles ====
(United States) Marty Riessen / (Australia) Margaret Court defeated (Australia) Allan Stone / (Netherlands) Betty Stöve, 6–4, 7–5

=== Juniors ===
==== Boys' singles ====
(New Zealand) Chris Lewis defeated (Ecuador) Ricardo Ycaza, 6–1, 6–4

==== Girls' singles ====
(Soviet Union) Natasha Chmyreva defeated (Czechoslovakia) Regina Maršíková, 6–4, 6–3

== Singles seeds ==
=== Men's singles ===
1. (United States) Jimmy Connors (final, lost to Arthur Ashe)
2. (Australia) Ken Rosewall (fourth round, lost to Tony Roche)
3. (Sweden) Björn Borg (quarterfinals, lost to Arthur Ashe)
4. (Argentina) Guillermo Vilas (quarterfinals, lost to Roscoe Tanner)
5. (Romania) Ilie Năstase (second round, lost to Sherwood Stewart)
6. (United States) Arthur Ashe (champion)
7. (United States) Stan Smith (first round, lost to Byron Bertram)
8. (Mexico) Raúl Ramírez (quarterfinals, lost to Jimmy Connors)
9. (Netherlands) Tom Okker (quarterfinals, lost to Tony Roche)
10. (Australia) John Alexander (second round, lost to Paul Kronk)
11. (United States) Roscoe Tanner (semifinals, lost to Jimmy Connors)
12. (Czechoslovakia) Jan Kodeš (second round, lost to Geoff Masters)
13. (United States) Marty Riessen (fourth round, lost to Björn Borg)
14. (United States) Vitas Gerulaitis (first round, lost to Ray Ruffels)
15. (New Zealand) Onny Parun (third round, lost to Sandy Mayer)
16. (Australia) Tony Roche (semifinals, lost to Arthur Ashe)

=== Women's singles ===
1. (United States) Chris Evert (semifinals, lost to Billie Jean King)
2. (Czechoslovakia) Martina Navrátilová (quarterfinals, lost to Margaret Court)
3. (United States) Billie Jean King (champion)
4. (Australia) Evonne Goolagong Cawley (final, lost to Billie Jean King)
5. (Australia) Margaret Court (semifinals, lost to Evonne Goolagong Cawley)
6. (United Kingdom) Virginia Wade (quarterfinals, lost to Evonne Goolagong Cawley)
7. (Soviet Union) Olga Morozova (quarterfinals, lost to Billie Jean King)
8. (Australia) Kerry Reid (second round, lost to Sue Barker)

Preceded by 1975 French Open	Grand Slams	Succeeded by 1975 US Open
