= Rowena Sanders =

South African tennis player

- Full name: Rowena Sanders (nee Whitehouse)
- Country (sports): South Africa
- Born: 30 June 1953 (age 72)
- Plays: Right-handed

Singles

Grand Slam singles results
- French Open: 1R (1976)
- Wimbledon: 2R (1974, 1975)

Doubles

Grand Slam doubles results
- Wimbledon: 2R (1976)

Grand Slam mixed doubles results
- Wimbledon: QF (1975)

Rowena Sanders (born 30 June 1953) is a South African former professional tennis player.

== Biography ==
Sanders, who was born Rowena Whitehouse, grew up in Durban.

During the 1970s, Sanders competed on the professional tour and appeared in the main draw of both the French Open and Wimbledon. She won the Chichester Rothmans Championships doubles title in 1974, partnering Carrie Meyer. Her best grand slam performance came at the 1975 Wimbledon Championships, where she and John Yuill were mixed doubles quarter-finalists.

A former South African Fed Cup captain, she led the team from 2004 to 2008 and continues to work as a tennis coach.
