= Michelle Tyler =

British tennis player (born 1958)

- Full name: Michelle Tyler-Wilson
- Country (sports): United Kingdom
- Residence: United Kingdom
- Born: 8 July 1958 (age 67) United Kingdom
- Turned pro: 1976

Singles
- Career titles: 0

Grand Slam singles results
- Australian Open: 2R (1976)
- French Open: 2R (1978)
- Wimbledon: 3R (1975, 1978)
- US Open: 3R (1977)

Doubles
- Career titles: 1

Grand Slam doubles results
- Australian Open: QF (1976)

Michelle Tyler (born 8 July 1958) is a British former professional tennis player who was the last British woman to win the singles title at the French Open Girls' event in 1976.

She reached the quarterfinal of the doubles event at the 1976 Australian Open, partnering Sue Barker, in which they lost in three sets to Kathleen Harter and Wendy Turnbull.

Tyler was the runner-up at the 1977 Kent Championships singles, losing to Yvonne Vermaak.

In 1977 and 1978, she was a member of the British team in the Wightman Cup, the annual women's team tennis competition between the United States and Great Britain. In 1977, she lost her singles rubber to Rosemary Casals, and the following year, she won her singles rubber against Pam Shriver.

== WTA career finals ==
=== Singles (1 runner-up) ===
Result	W/L	Date	Tournament	Surface	Opponent	Score
Loss	0–1	Jun 1977	Beckenham, UK	Grass	(South Africa) Yvonne Vermaak	4–6, 7–5, 1–6

=== Doubles (1 titles, 2 runner-ups) ===
Result	W/L	Date	Tournament	Surface	Partner	Opponents	Score
Win	1–0	Dec 1975	Adelaide, Australia	Grass	(United Kingdom) Sue Barker	(Australia) Kym Ruddell (Australia) Janet Young	7–5, 6–3
Loss	1–1	Dec 1975	Perth, Australia	Grass	(United Kingdom) Sue Barker	(Australia) Lesley Bowrey (Australia) Christine Matison	6–7, 3–6
Loss	2–1	Jun 1978	Chichester, UK	Grass	(South Africa) Yvonne Vermaak	(United States) Janet Newberry (United States) Pam Shriver	3–6, 6–3, 6–4

== Retirement ==
Tyler retired in 1979 and worked at a department store in Bromley as well as woredas a tennis coach. She subsequently emigrated to the United States.
