= Natasha Chmyreva =

Soviet Russian tennis player

- Country (sports): Soviet Union
- Born: 28 May 1958 Moscow, Russian SFSR, Soviet Union
- Died: 16 August 2015 (aged 57)

Singles

Grand Slam singles results
- Australian Open: SF (1975)
- French Open: 1R (1973)
- Wimbledon: 4R (1975, 1976)
- US Open: QF (1976)

Doubles

Grand Slam doubles results
- Australian Open: 2R (1975)
- US Open: QF (1976)

Mixed doubles
- Career record: –
- Career titles: –

Grand Slam mixed doubles results
- Wimbledon: 2R (1975)
Medal record
Representing Soviet Union
Summer Universiade
| Gold medal – first place | 1979 Mexico City | Singles |
| Bronze medal – third place | 1979 Mexico City | Doubles |

Natalya Yuryevna "Natasha" Chmyreva (Russian: Наталья Юрьевна Чмырёва, romanized: Natalya Yuryevna Chmyryova; 28 May 1958 – 16 August 2015) was a Russian tennis player who won 1975 and 1976 Wimbledon girls' singles championships and 1975 US Open girls' singles championship

== Life ==
Natasha Chmyreva was born on 28 May 1958 in the USSR.

== Career ==
In 1975, Natasha Chmyreva reached the semifinals of the Australian Open, losing to Martina Navratilova. In 1976, she reached the quarterfinals of the U.S. Open. Her last international match was against Tracy Austin at the Fed Cup in 1979.
