= 1974 French Open – Men's singles qualifying =

Men's singles qualifying
- 1974 French Open

Events
Singles	men	women		boys	girls
Doubles	men	women	mixed	boys	girls
WC Singles	men	women	quad
WC Doubles	men	women	quad
Legends	−45	45+	women
← 1973 ·	French Open	· 1975 →

Players who neither had high enough rankings nor received wild cards to enter the main draw of the annual French Open Tennis Championships participated in a qualifying tournament held in the week before the event.

== Qualifiers ==
1. (France) Hervé Gauvain
2. (France) Michel Leclercq
3. (France) Jean Lovera
4. (France) Patrice Hagelauer
5. (France) Jean-François Caujolle
6. (Romania) Gavorielle Marcu
7. (Bolivia) Ramiro Benavides
8. (Morocco) Omar Laimina
9. (France) Pierre Joly
10. (France) Thierry Bernasconi
11. (Hungary) Róbert Machán
12. (Paraguay) Víctor Pecci
13. (Japan) Jun Kuki
14. (Argentina) Lito Álvarez
15. (Venezuela) Jorge Andrew
16. (Pakistan) Munawar Iqbal

== Lucky losers ==
1. (France) Maurice Claitte

== Qualifying draw ==
=== Key ===
- Q = Qualifier
- WC = Wild card
- LL = Lucky loser
- Alt = Alternate
- ITF = ITF entry
- PR = Protected ranking
- SR = Special ranking
- SE = Special exempt
- JE = Junior exempt
- JR = Junior Accelerator Programme entrant
- CO = College Accelerator Programme entrant
- NG = Next Gen Accelerator Program entrant
- w/o = Walkover
- r = Retired
- d = Defaulted

=== First qualifier ===
First round

Second round
(United States) J Zouhir
(Romania) Ionel Santeiu	w/o
(France) Hervé Gauvain	6	6
(Argentina) Roberto Aubone	4	0
(France) Bernard Paul
(Australia) Ernie Ewert	w/o
(Italy) Sergio Palmieri	6	6
(France) Philippe Seghers	3	0

Third round
(United States) J Zouhir	5	4
(France) Hervé Gauvain	7	6
(France) Bernard Paul	3	4
(Italy) Sergio Palmieri	6	6

Qualifying competition
(France) Hervé Gauvain	6	5	6
(Italy) Sergio Palmieri	3	7	3

=== Second qualifier ===
First round

Second round
(Socialist Federal Republic of Yugoslavia) Zoltan Ilin
(Poland) Jacek Niedźwiedzki	w/o
(France) Jacques-Édouard Goulard
(West Germany) Karl Fichtel	w/o
(France) Éric Huet	6	6
(New Zealand) Frederick Whittaker	0	1
(France) Michel Leclercq	6	6
(United States) J Reynolds	1	3

Third round
(Socialist Federal Republic of Yugoslavia) Zoltan Ilin	w/o
(France) Jacques-Édouard Goulard
(France) Éric Huet	3	2
(France) Michel Leclercq	6	6

Qualifying competition
(France) Jacques-Éouard Goulard	w/o
(France) Michel Leclercq

=== Third qualifier ===
First round

Second round
(Czechoslovakia) Václav Krasny
(United States) Norman Holmes	w/o
(France) Marc Boulle	6	2	6
(Italy) Carlo Borea	2	6	3
(France) Jean Lovera
(United States) Jeff Edwards	w/o
(France) Éric Van Rillas	3	6	6
(United States) J Metzger	6	3	2

Third round
(Czechoslovakia) Václav Krasny	6	0	7
(France) Marc Boulle	4	6	5
(France) Jean Lovera	6	6
(France) Éric Van Rillas	2	1

Qualifying competition
(Czechoslovakia) Václav Krasny	6	6	3
(France) Jean Lovera	7	2	6

=== Fourth qualifier ===
First round

Second round
(West Germany) Christian Kuhnke
(Socialist Federal Republic of Yugoslavia) Milos Dimitrijević	w/o
(France) Fabrice Paquet	6	6
(South Africa) Mervyn Webster	1	2
(France) Patrice Hagelauer
(Austria) Peter Pokorny	w/o
(France) Jean-Louis Thiebaut
(India) Bhanu Nunna	w/o

Third round
(West Germany) Christian Kuhnke	w/o
(France) Fabrice Paquet
(France) Patrice Hagelauer	6	7
(France) Jean-Louis Thiebaut	0	5

Qualifying competition
(France) Fabrice Paquet	2	2
(France) Patrice Hagelauer	6	6

=== Fifth qualifier ===
First round
(France) J. Sulc
(Spain) Juan Ignacio Muntañola	w/o
(France) Bernard Fritz
(Australia) John Trickey	w/o
(France) Christian Duxin	6	6
(Italy) Enzo Vattuone	4	4
(France) Denis Grozdanovitch
(United States) J Van De Loo	w/o
(France) Jean-François Caujolle	6	6
(Israel) Oren Grundberg	2	3
(Mexico) Raúl Contreras
(Socialist Federal Republic of Yugoslavia) Igor Košak	w/o

Second round
(Hungary) János Benyik	6	7
(France) Xavier Lemoine	3	5
(France) J. Sulc	7	7
(France) Bernard Fritz	5	5
(France) Christian Duxin	1	1
(France) Denis Grozdanovitch	6	6
(France) Jean-François Caujolle	6	6
(Mexico) Raúl Contreras	1	3

Third round
(Hungary) János Benyik	6	6
(France) J. Sulc	3	3
(France) Denis Grozdanovitch	1	2
(France) Jean-François Caujolle	6	6

Qualifying competition
(Hungary) János Benyik	4	5
(France) Jean-François Caujolle	6	7

=== Sixth qualifier ===
First round
(Hungary) Géza Varga	2	6	6
(Mexico) Roberto Chávez	6	0	2
(Ecuador) Eduardo Zuleta	6	4	6
(France) Philippe Couson	1	6	4
(Japan) Kenichi Hirai	6	6
(United States) J Kluthe	1	3
(France) Denis Naegelen
(Egypt) Aly El Dawoudi	w/o
(United States) R. Jordan
(Madagascar) Martin Razafindrakoto	w/o
(Romania) Gavorielle Marcu
(Australia) Trevor Little	w/o
(Chile) Alejandro Pakozdi
(France) Jacques Thamin	w/o
(France) Bertrand Hugon
(West Germany) Erwin Muller	w/o

Second round
(Hungary) Géza Varga	3	6	6
(Ecuador) Eduardo Zuleta	6	1	2
(Japan) Kenichi Hirai	3	4
(France) Denis Naegelen	6	6
(United States) R. Jordan	3	1
(Romania) Gavorielle Marcu	6	6
(Chile) Alejandro Pakozdi	3	6	2
(France) Bertrand Hugon	6	3	6

Third round
(Hungary) Géza Varga	6	3	6
(France) Denis Naegelen	3	6	4
(Romania) Gavorielle Marcu	7	6
(France) Bertrand Hugon	6	0

Qualifying competition
(Hungary) Géza Varga	6	4	1
(Romania) Gavorielle Marcu	2	6	6

=== Seventh qualifier ===
First round
(Australia) Bob Rheinberger
(Switzerland) Dimitri Sturdza	w/o
(Bolivia) Ramiro Benavides	6	6
(France) Jean-Pierre Bonnet	1	3
(Argentina) Francisco Mastelli	6	5	6
(France) Alain Bouteleux	3	7	4
(France) Alain Abello
(United States) Mike Powers	w/o
(Italy) Vittorio Crotta	6	6
(France) Jacques Laurent	1	0
(Spain) Rafael Ruiz	7	6
(Japan) Bin-Ichi Kin	6	3
(France) Jean-Paul Meyer
(New Zealand) Nicky Boyne	w/o
(France) Sampiero Gavini	6	6
(Argentina) Miguel Quintin	3	2

Second round
(Australia) Bob Rheinberger	2	2
(Bolivia) Ramiro Benavides	6	6
(Argentina) Francisco Mastelli	6	4	7
(France) Alain Abello	4	6	5
(Italy) Vittorio Crotta	6	6	6
(Spain) Rafael Ruiz	7	4	3
(France) Jean-Paul Meyer	6	6
(France) Sampiero Gavini	0	2

Third round
(Bolivia) Ramiro Benavides	6	6
(Argentina) Francisco Mastelli	4	1
(Italy) Vittorio Crotta	7	5	0
(France) Jean-Paul Meyer	6	7	6

Qualifying competition
(Bolivia) Ramiro Benavides	6	2	6
(France) Jean-Paul Meyer	1	6	0

=== Eighth qualifier ===
First round
(Czechoslovakia) Pavel Složil
(Socialist Federal Republic of Yugoslavia) Nikola Špear	w/o
(United States) Gus Pellizzi	1	7	6
(France) Patrick Béraud	6	5	3
(Morocco) Omar Laimina
(United States) Bob Hochstadter	w/o
(France) Édouard Thamin
(Hungary) István Gulyás	w/o
(Australia) Alvin Gardiner	6	6
(France) Bernard Montrenaud	3	4
(Japan) Yuji Tezuka	6	6
(France) Michel Laurent	2	1
(France) Christophe Roger-Vasselin
(Pakistan) Saeed Meer	w/o
(Romania) Sever Muresan	6	6
(France) Jean-Pierre Courcol	1	3

Second round
(Czechoslovakia) Pavel Složil	7	4	4
(United States) Gus Pellizzi	5	6	6
(Morocco) Omar Laimina	6	6
(France) Édouard Thamin	0	1
(Australia) Alvin Gardiner	6	6	6
(Japan) Yuji Tezuka	7	4	1
(France) Christophe Roger-Vasselin	6	6
(Romania) Sever Muresan	3	2

Third round
(United States) Gus Pellizzi	4	3
(Morocco) Omar Laimina	6	6
(Australia) Alvin Gardiner	4	2
(France) Christophe Roger-Vasselin	6	6

Qualifying competition
(Morocco) Omar Laimina	2	6	6
(France) Christophe Roger-Vasselin	6	1	0

=== Ninth qualifier ===
First round
(Mexico) Luis Baraldi	3	6	6
(United States) Larry Parker	6	1	4
(France) Pierre Joly	6	7
(New Zealand) Ian Beverley	3	6
(France) Christophe Freyss
(Chile) Alejandro Pierola	w/o
(France) Alain Cassaigne	6	6
(Australia) William Mason	3	1
(Bolivia) Eduardo Gorostiaga	6	6
(Mexico) Benito Schon	3	1
(Japan) Kiyoshi Tanabe	6	6
(France) Jean-Claude Fauvet	4	1
(France) Bruno Renoult	0	6	6
(Italy) Gianluigi Signorini	6	1	3
(Romania) Viorel Sotiriu	6	6
(Poland) Wojciech Fibak	4	3

Second round
(Mexico) Luis Baraldi	1	7	2
(France) Pierre Joly	6	5	6
(France) Christophe Freyss	3	6
(France) Alain Cassaigne	6	7
(Bolivia) Eduardo Gorostiaga	6	3	4
(Japan) Kiyoshi Tanabe	3	6	6
(France) Bruno Renoult	5	2
(Romania) Viorel Sotiriu	7	6

Third round
(France) Pierre Joly	7	6
(France) Alain Cassaigne	6	3
(Japan) Kiyoshi Tanabe	0	4
(Romania) Viorel Sotiriu	6	6

Qualifying competition
(France) Pierre Joly	6	7
(Romania) Viorel Sotiriu	3	5

=== Tenth qualifier ===
First round
(United States) Michael Mullan
(Switzerland) Freddy Blatter	w/o
(France) Thierry Bernasconi	6	6
(Israel) Felix Kaplan	4	2
(France) Jean-Paul Loth
(Socialist Federal Republic of Yugoslavia) Dragan Savić	w/o
(France) Jean-Luc Boutet
(India) Ashok Amritraj	w/o
(Argentina) Tierry Quintin	6	4	6
(France) François Pierson	4	6	4
(Czechoslovakia) Jan Šimbera	6	6
(France) Bernard Detroye	1	3
(United States) J Figge
(United States) Robert Stock	w/o
(United States) J Kadour
(Australia) William Durham	w/o

Second round
(United States) Michael Mullan	w/o
(France) Thierry Bernasconi
(France) Jean-Paul Loth	6	7
(France) Jean-Luc Boutet	3	5
(Argentina) Tierry Quintin	1	6	6
(Czechoslovakia) Jan Šimbera	6	1	2
(United States) J Figge	6	6
(United States) J Kadour	2	2

Third round
(France) Thierry Bernasconi	6	6
(France) Jean-Paul Loth	2	4
(Argentina) Tierry Quintin	6	6
(United States) J Figge	3	2

Qualifying competition
(France) Thierry Bernasconi	6	6
(Argentina) Tierry Quintin	1	1

=== Eleventh qualifier ===
First round
(Romania) Dumitru Hărădău
(United States) J Jainer	w/o
(France) Patrice Beust
(New Zealand) Russell Simpson	w/o
(Mexico) J. Reyes
(United States) Brant Bailey	w/o
(France) François Matheu
(Australia) Chris Kachel	w/o
(France) Jean-Claude Bonhomme	7	6
(Canada) Guy Tytherleigh	6	2
(United States) J Borucki
(Turkey) Beyazit Anbar	w/o
(Hungary) Róbert Machán	6	6
(Italy) Gianni Ocleppo	3	1
(France) Jean-Roger Cadot
(South Africa) William Freer	w/o

Second round
(Romania) Dumitru Hărădău	1	3
(France) Patrice Beust	6	6
(Mexico) J. Reyes	6	3	2
(France) François Matheu	4	6	6
(France) Jean-Claude Bonhomme	6	3	2
(United States) J Borucki	2	6	6
(Hungary) Róbert Machán	6	6
(France) Jean-Roger Cadot	1	2

Third round
(France) Patrice Beust	6	6
(France) François Matheu	2	1
(United States) J Borucki	2	3
(Hungary) Róbert Machán	6	6

Qualifying competition
(France) Patrice Beust	5	5
(Hungary) Róbert Machán	7	7

=== Twelfth qualifier ===
First round
(Czechoslovakia) Pavel Ševčík	6	6
(United States) J Fredrik	0	0
(France) Jean-Louis Haillet	3	6	6
(Socialist Federal Republic of Yugoslavia) Žarko Burić	6	0	0
(France) François Battegay
(Spain) José Moreno	w/o
(Argentina) Norberto Herrero
(United States) Ak Elkins	w/o
(Paraguay) Víctor Pecci
(France) Claude Boutard	w/o

Second round
(Czechoslovakia) Pavel Ševčík	6	6
(France) Jean-Louis Haillet	4	4
(France) François Battegay	3	6	7
(Argentina) Norberto Herrero	6	1	5
(Paraguay) Víctor Pecci	6	6
(United States) J Wade	4	3
(Spain) José Castañón
(France) Philippe Meniane	w/o

Third round
(Czechoslovakia) Pavel Ševčík	4	6	4
(France) François Battegay	6	3	6
(Paraguay) Víctor Pecci	6	7
(Spain) José Castañón	4	5

Qualifying competition
(France) François Battegay	2	3
(Paraguay) Víctor Pecci	6	6

=== Thirteenth qualifier ===
First round

Second round
(Mexico) Carlos López
(United States) Steve Krulevitz	w/o
(Monaco) Louis Borfiga
(Australia) Geoffrey Twist	w/o
(Monaco) Bernard Balleret
(France) J Seghers	w/o
(Japan) Jun Kuki	6	7
(Socialist Federal Republic of Yugoslavia) Dragan Stojović	2	6

Third round
(Mexico) Carlos López	0	6	5
(Monaco) Louis Borfiga	6	3	7
(Monaco) Bernard Balleret	6	6	1
(Japan) Jun Kuki	7	4	6

Qualifying competition
(Monaco) Louis Borfiga	3	1
(Japan) Jun Kuki	6	6

=== Fourteenth qualifier ===
First round

Second round
(France) Christophe Casa	6	6
(Brazil) Luis-Carlos Enck	3	1
(France) Michel Bergès
(Algeria) Sebti Bounaib	w/o
(Monaco) Emmanuel Van Der Pol
(West Germany) Peter Holl	w/o
(Argentina) Lito Álvarez	6	6
(Czechoslovakia) Josef Solc	3	0

Third round
(France) Christophe Casa	6	6
(France) Michel Bergès	2	1
(Monaco) Emmanuel Van Der Pol	6	2	3
(Argentina) Lito Álvarez	2	6	6

Qualifying competition
(France) Christophe Casa	1	1
(Argentina) Lito Álvarez	6	6

=== Fifteenth qualifier ===
First round

Second round
(France) Maurice Claitte	6	6
(United States) J Shields	0	1
(Greece) Nicolas Kelaidis	6	6
(Australia) Elwyn McCabe	3	1
(France) Michel Hervy
(Italy) Pietro Marzano	w/o
(Venezuela) Jorge Andrew
(Socialist Federal Republic of Yugoslavia) Nikša Šuka	w/o

Third round
(France) Maurice Claitte	4	6	6
(Greece) Nicolas Kelaidis	6	2	3
(France) Michel Hervy	1	3
(Venezuela) Jorge Andrew	6	6

Qualifying competition
(France) Maurice Claitte	1	5
(Venezuela) Jorge Andrew	6	7

=== Sixteenth qualifier ===
First round

Second round
(France) Éric Loliée
(South Africa) Bob Hewitt	w/o
(United States) Ben Bishop	6	6
(France) Bruno Sapène	4	1
(United States) Butch Buchholz
(Algeria) Saifi Batiche	w/o
(Pakistan) Munawar Iqbal
(New Zealand) Anthony Parun	w/o

Third round
(France) Éric Loliée	1	1
(United States) Ben Bishop	6	6
(United States) Butch Buchholz	6	0	3
(Pakistan) Munawar Iqbal	3	6	6

Qualifying competition
(United States) Ben Bishop	2	2
(Pakistan) Munawar Iqbal	6	6
