= 1974 Dutch Open – Doubles =

Doubles
- 1974 Dutch Open

Final
- Champion: (Argentina) Tito Vázquez (Argentina) Guillermo Vilas
- Runner-up: (Argentina) Lito Álvarez (Argentina) Julián Ganzábal
- Score: 6–2, 3–6, 6–1, 6–2

Details
- Draw: 16

Events
Singles	Doubles
← 1973 ·	Dutch Open	· 1975 →

The 1974 Dutch Open – Doubles was an event of the 1974 Dutch Open tennis tournament and was played on outdoor clay courts at 't Melkhuisje in Hilversum in the Netherlands from 21 July until 28 July 1975. The draw consisted of 16 teams. Iván Molina and Allan Stone were the defending Dutch Open doubles champions but did not compete in this edition. Tito Vázquez and Guillermo Vilas won the title by defeating Lito Álvarez and Julián Ganzábal in the all-Argentine final, 6–2, 3–6, 6–1, 6–2.

== Draw ==
=== Key ===
- Q = Qualifier
- WC = Wild card
- LL = Lucky loser
- Alt = Alternate
- SE = Special exempt
- PR = Protected ranking
- ITF = ITF entry
- JE = Junior exempt
- w/o = Walkover
- r = Retired
- d = Defaulted
- SR = Special ranking

First Round
(Argentina) Guillermo Vilas (Argentina) Tito Vázquez	6	6
(Japan) Kenichi Hirai (Japan) Jun Kuki	1	3
(France) Jean-Claude Barclay (France) Jean-Paul Meyer	7	6
(Brazil) Carlos Kirmayr (Mexico) Raúl Contreras	6	2
(United Kingdom) Mark Farrell (United Kingdom) John Lloyd	7	6	7
(Netherlands) Fred Hemmes Sr. (Netherlands) Marian Laudin	6	7	6
(Chile) Belus Prajoux (Chile) Patricio Rodríguez	6	6
(South Africa) Clive Brebnor (Argentina) P. Gorostiaga	3	3
(Australia) Barry Phillips-Moore (United States) John Fort	2	2
(Denmark) Tom Christensen (Denmark) Lars Elvstrøm	6	6
(West Germany) Attila Korpás (West Germany) Alex Kurucz	6	6
(Switzerland) Freddy Blatter (Switzerland) Petr Kanderal	4	4
(Japan) Jun Kamiwazumi (Mexico) Marcello Lara	6	6
(Hungary) Bertalan Csoknyai (Hungary) Geza Varga	0	3
(Argentina) Lito Álvarez (Argentina) Julián Ganzábal	6	6
(Australia) Ernie Ewert (Australia) Paul Kronk	4	2

Quarterfinals
(Argentina) Guillermo Vilas (Argentina) Tito Vázquez	6	7
(France) Jean-Claude Barclay (France) Jean-Paul Meyer	3	5
(United Kingdom) Mark Farrell (United Kingdom) John Lloyd	4	6	6
(Chile) Belus Prajoux (Chile) Patricio Rodríguez	6	3	7
(Denmark) Tom Christensen (Denmark) Lars Elvstrøm	6	6	4
(West Germany) Attila Korpás (West Germany) Alex Kurucz	7	4	6
(Japan) Jun Kamiwazumi (Mexico) Marcello Lara	4	4
(Argentina) Lito Álvarez (Argentina) Julián Ganzábal	6	6

Semifinals
(Argentina) Guillermo Vilas (Argentina) Tito Vázquez	6	7
(Chile) Belus Prajoux (Chile) Patricio Rodríguez	4	6
(West Germany) Attila Korpás (West Germany) Alex Kurucz	6	3
(Argentina) Lito Álvarez (Argentina) Julián Ganzábal	7	6

Final
(Argentina) Guillermo Vilas (Argentina) Tito Vázquez	6	3	6	6
(Argentina) Lito Álvarez (Argentina) Julián Ganzábal	2	6	1	2
