= 1975 Dutch Open – Doubles =

Doubles
- 1975 Dutch Open

Final
- Champion: (Poland) Wojciech Fibak (Argentina) Guillermo Vilas
- Runner-up: (Socialist Federal Republic of Yugoslavia) Željko Franulović (United Kingdom) John Lloyd
- Score: 6–4, 6–3

Details
- Draw: 16

Events
Singles	Doubles
← 1974 ·	Dutch Open	· 1976 →

The 1975 Dutch Open – Doubles was an event of the 1975 Dutch Open tennis tournament and was played on outdoor clay courts at 't Melkhuisje in Hilversum in the Netherlands from 20 July until 27 July 1975. The draw consisted of 15 teams. Tito Vázquez and Guillermo Vilas were the defending Dutch Open doubles champions but did not compete together in this edition. Wojciech Fibak and Guillermo Vilas won the title by defeating Željko Franulović and John Lloyd in the final, 6–4, 6–3.

== Draw ==
=== Key ===
- Q = Qualifier
- WC = Wild card
- LL = Lucky loser
- Alt = Alternate
- SE = Special exempt
- PR = Protected ranking
- ITF = ITF entry
- JE = Junior exempt
- w/o = Walkover
- r = Retired
- d = Defaulted
- SR = Special ranking

First Round
(West Germany) Jürgen Fassbender (West Germany) Hans-Jürgen Pohmann	b	y	e
(France) Georges Goven (France) Patrick Proisy	6	5	6
(Switzerland) Petr Kanderal (Australia) Barry Phillips-Moore	4	7	4
(Poland) Wojciech Fibak (Argentina) Guillermo Vilas	6	6
(Paraguay) Víctor Pecci (Argentina) Tito Vázquez	2	2
(Czechoslovakia) Milan Holeček (Mexico) Marcello Lara	6	5	6
(Egypt) Ismail El Shafei (United States) Armistead Neely	1	7	4
(Socialist Federal Republic of Yugoslavia) Željko Franulović (United Kingdom) John Lloyd	2	7	8
(United States) Norman Holmes (Netherlands) Rolf Thung	6	6	6
(France) Patrice Dominguez (France) François Jauffret	6	6	6
(Argentina) Elio Lito Alvarez (Argentina) Julián Ganzábal	7	3	2
(Colombia) Iván Molina (Colombia) Jairo Velasco Sr.	7	6
(Venezuela) Humphrey Hose (Netherlands) Louk Sanders	6	4
(Australia) Dick Crealy (Socialist Federal Republic of Yugoslavia) Nikola Pilić	6	6
(United Kingdom) Martin Robinson (Socialist Federal Republic of Yugoslavia) Nikola Špear	4	2

Quarterfinals
(West Germany) Jürgen Fassbender (West Germany) Hans-Jürgen Pohmann	7	6
(France) Georges Goven (France) Patrick Proisy	5	2
(Poland) Wojciech Fibak (Argentina) Guillermo Vilas	6	6
(Czechoslovakia) Milan Holeček (Mexico) Marcello Lara	4	4
(Socialist Federal Republic of Yugoslavia) Željko Franulović (United Kingdom) John Lloyd	6	6
(France) Patrice Dominguez (France) François Jauffret	1	3
(Colombia) Iván Molina (Colombia) Jairo Velasco Sr.	3	7	6
(Australia) Dick Crealy (Socialist Federal Republic of Yugoslavia) Nikola Pilić	6	6	2

Semifinals
(West Germany) Jürgen Fassbender (West Germany) Hans-Jürgen Pohmann	4	6	6
(Poland) Wojciech Fibak (Argentina) Guillermo Vilas	6	4	8
(Socialist Federal Republic of Yugoslavia) Željko Franulović (United Kingdom) John Lloyd	6	4	6
(Colombia) Iván Molina (Colombia) Jairo Velasco Sr.	2	6	1

Final
(Poland) Wojciech Fibak (Argentina) Guillermo Vilas	6	6
(Socialist Federal Republic of Yugoslavia) Željko Franulović (United Kingdom) John Lloyd	4	3
