= 1974 Dutch Open – Singles =

Singles
- 1974 Dutch Open

Final
- Champion: (Argentina) Guillermo Vilas
- Runner-up: (Australia) Barry Phillips-Moore
- Score: 6–4, 6–2, 1–6, 6–3

Details
- Draw: 32

Events
Singles	Doubles
← 1973 ·	Dutch Open	· 1975 →

The 1974 Dutch Open – Singles was an event of the 1974 Dutch Open tennis tournament and was played on outdoor clay courts at 't Melkhuisje in Hilversum in the Netherlands from 21 July until 28 July 1974. The draw comprised 32 players. Tom Okker was the defending Dutch Open singles champion but did not compete in this edition. Guillermo Vilas won the title by defeating Barry Phillips-Moore in the final, 6–4, 6–2, 1–6, 6–3.

== Draw ==
=== Key ===
- Q = Qualifier
- WC = Wild card
- LL = Lucky loser
- Alt = Alternate
- SE = Special exempt
- PR = Protected ranking
- ITF = ITF entry
- JE = Junior exempt
- w/o = Walkover
- r = Retired
- d = Defaulted
- SR = Special ranking

=== Finals ===
Semifinals
(Argentina) Guillermo Vilas	6	6	6
(Mexico) Marcello Lara	4	4	4
(Australia) Paul Kronk	6	2	3	3
(Australia) Barry Phillips-Moore	3	6	6	6

Final
(Argentina) Guillermo Vilas	6	6	6	1
(Australia) Barry Phillips-Moore	4	2	6	3

=== Top half ===
First Round
(Argentina) Guillermo Vilas	6	6
(Bolivia) Eduardo Gorostiaga	1	2
(Netherlands) Jan Hordijk	6	7
(United States) John Fort	1	5
(Argentina) Julián Ganzábal	6	6
(Switzerland) Dimitri Sturdza	4	1
(West Germany) Attila Korpás	6	6
(Netherlands) Fred Hemmes Sr.	2	1
(United Kingdom) John Lloyd	6	6
(Denmark) Tom Christensen	4	1
(Argentina) Elio Lito Alvarez	6	6	7
(France) Jean-Claude Barclay	1	7	6
(Mexico) Marcello Lara	6	6
(Denmark) Lars Elvstrøm	2	3
(Japan) Jun Kuki	4	6	2
(Hungary) Bertalan Csoknyai	6	4	6

Second Round
(Argentina) Guillermo Vilas	6	6
(Netherlands) Jan Hordijk	2	1
(Argentina) Julián Ganzábal	7	7
(West Germany) Attila Korpás	5	6
(United Kingdom) John Lloyd	7	7
(Argentina) Elio Lito Alvarez	6	6
(Mexico) Marcello Lara	1	6	6
(Hungary) Bertalan Csoknyai	6	4	4

Quarterfinals
(Argentina) Guillermo Vilas	6	6
(Argentina) Julián Ganzábal	3	4
(United Kingdom) John Lloyd	2	6	2
(Mexico) Marcello Lara	6	1	6

Semifinals
(Argentina) Guillermo Vilas	6	6	6
(Mexico) Marcello Lara	4	4	4

=== Bottom half ===
First Round
(South Africa) Bob Maud	4	7	3
(Netherlands) Louk Sanders	6	5	6
(Chile) Patricio Rodríguez	6	5	6
(Japan) Kenichi Hirai	3	7	3
(Argentina) Tito Vázquez	6	2	6
(Australia) Bob Rheinberger	2	6	2
(Australia) Paul Kronk	6	6
(France) Jean-Paul Meyer	4	3
(Australia) Barry Phillips-Moore	1	7	6
(Switzerland) Petr Kanderal	6	6	4
(Chile) Belus Prajoux	6	5	7
(West Germany) Alex Kurucz	4	7	6
(Japan) Jun Kamiwazumi	6	4	7
(Venezuela) Jorge Andrew	1	6	5
(Hungary) Geza Varga	6	6
(United Kingdom) Mark Farrell	3	2

Second Round
(Netherlands) Louk Sanders	6	6
(Chile) Patricio Rodríguez	1	4
(Argentina) Tito Vázquez	3	3
(Australia) Paul Kronk	6	6
(Australia) Barry Phillips-Moore	6	6	6
(Chile) Belus Prajoux	7	4	3
(Japan) Jun Kamiwazumi	5	6	6
(Hungary) Geza Varga	7	4	1

Quarterfinals
(Netherlands) Louk Sanders	4	3
(Australia) Paul Kronk	6	6
(Australia) Barry Phillips-Moore	3	6	6
(Japan) Jun Kamiwazumi	6	3	2

Semifinals
(Australia) Paul Kronk	6	2	3
(Australia) Barry Phillips-Moore	3	6	6
