= 1976 French Open – Men's doubles =

Men's doubles
- 1976 French Open

Final
- Champion: (United States) Fred McNair (United States) Sherwood Stewart
- Runner-up: (United States) Brian Gottfried (Mexico) Raúl Ramírez
- Score: 7–6^{(8-6)}, 6–3, 6–1

Details
- Draw: 47
- Seeds: 2

Events
Singles	men	women		boys	girls
Doubles	men	women	mixed	boys	girls
WC Singles	men	women	quad
WC Doubles	men	women	quad
Legends	−45	45+	women
← 1975 ·	French Open	· 1977 →

Brian Gottfried and Raúl Ramírez were the defending champions but lost in the final 7–6^{(8-6)}, 6–3, 6–1 against Fred McNair and Sherwood Stewart.

== Seeds ==
1. (Spain) Juan Gisbert / (Spain) Manuel Orantes (semifinals)
2. (United States) Brian Gottfried / (Mexico) Raúl Ramírez (final)

== Draw ==
=== Key ===
- Q = Qualifier
- WC = Wild card
- LL = Lucky loser
- Alt = Alternate
- ITF = ITF entry
- PR = Protected ranking
- SR = Special ranking
- SE = Special exempt
- JE = Junior exempt
- JR = Junior Accelerator Programme entrant
- CO = College Accelerator Programme entrant
- NG = Next Gen Accelerator Program entrant
- w/o = Walkover
- r = Retired
- d = Defaulted

=== Finals ===
Quarterfinals
1	(Spain) Juan Gisbert (Spain) Manuel Orantes	6	6
(Australia) Mark Edmondson (Australia) Geoff Masters	1	3
(Argentina) Ricardo Cano (Chile) Belus Prajoux	4	1
(United States) Fred McNair (United States) Sherwood Stewart	6	6
(France) Patrice Dominguez (France) François Jauffret	6	6
(West Germany) Jürgen Fassbender (West Germany) Hans-Jürgen Pohmann	2	2
(Chile) Patricio Cornejo (Chile) Jaime Fillol	4	6
2	(United States) Brian Gottfried (Mexico) Raúl Ramírez	6	7

Semifinals
1	(Spain) Juan Gisbert (Spain) Manuel Orantes	6	4
(United States) Fred McNair (United States) Sherwood Stewart	7	6
(France) Patrice Dominguez (France) François Jauffret	5	1
2	(United States) Brian Gottfried (Mexico) Raúl Ramírez	7	6

Final
(United States) Fred McNair (United States) Sherwood Stewart	7^{8}	6	6
2	(United States) Brian Gottfried (Mexico) Raúl Ramírez	6^{6}	3	1

=== Top half ===
==== Section 1 ====
First round
(Australia) W Lloyd (Czechoslovakia) F Pála	6	6
(France) C Freyss (France) C Roger-Vasselin	2	3
(United States) D Dell (United States) B Martin	6	6
(Monaco) B Balleret (Monaco) L Borfiga	1	2
(Australia) M Edmondson (Australia) G Masters	6	6
(Italy) G Ocleppo (Romania) I Sânteiu	2	1
(Australia) B Carmichael (South Africa) R Moore	4	6	4
(United States) R Reid (Socialist Federal Republic of Yugoslavia) N Špear	6	1	6

Second round
1	(Spain) J Gisbert (Spain) M Orantes	6	6
(Australia) W Lloyd (Czechoslovakia) F Pála	2	2
(United States) D Dell (United States) B Martin	7	6
(Argentina) E Álvarez (Paraguay) V Pecci	6	4
(Australia) M Edmondson (Australia) G Masters	6	6
(United States) J McManus (Sweden) T Svensson	2	2
(United States) R Reid (Socialist Federal Republic of Yugoslavia) N Špear	3	6	5
(Rhodesia) C Dowdeswell (Australia) C Kachel	6	3	7

Third round
1	(Spain) J Gisbert (Spain) M Orantes	4	6	6
(United States) D Dell (United States) B Martin	6	3	2
(Australia) M Edmondson (Australia) G Masters	6	6	6
(Rhodesia) C Dowdeswell (Australia) C Kachel	7	3	3

Quarterfinals
1	(Spain) J Gisbert (Spain) M Orantes	6	6
(Australia) M Edmondson (Australia) G Masters	1	3

==== Section 2 ====
First round
(Morocco) O Laimina (France) J Thamin	6	5	2
(United States) H Bunis (United States) T Waltke	4	7	6
(France) R Brunet (France) Y Noah	6	7
(United Kingdom) R Lewis (United Kingdom) M Robinson	1	5
(United States) F McNair (United States) S Stewart	6	2	6
(Italy) G Majoli (Italy) S Palmieri	4	6	2
(United States) J Andrews (Australia) C Dibley	6	6
(Argentina) E Caviglia (Spain) Á Giménez	3	1

Second round
(Poland) W Fibak (West Germany) K Meiler	6	6
(United States) H Bunis (United States) T Waltke	3	0
(Argentina) R Cano (Chile) B Prajoux	6	6
(France) R Brunet (France) Y Noah	3	2
(United States) F McNair (United States) S Stewart	6	6
(France) P Beust (France) D Contet	4	4
(United States) J Andrews (Australia) C Dibley	6	6
(Australia) A Gardiner (New Zealand) R Simpson	0	3

Third round
(Poland) W Fibak (West Germany) K Meiler	3	6
(Argentina) R Cano (Chile) B Prajoux	6	7
(United States) F McNair (United States) S Stewart	6	7
(United States) J Andrews (Australia) C Dibley	3	6

Quarterfinals
(Argentina) R Cano (Chile) B Prajoux	4	1
(United States) F McNair (United States) S Stewart	6	6

=== Bottom half ===
==== Section 3 ====
First round
(United States) S Krulevitz (United States) S Turner	3	6	6
(France) P Barthès (France) D Naegelen	6	4	1
(Argentina) J Ganzábal (Japan) J Kamiwazumi	3	7	2
(France) P Dominguez (France) F Jauffret	6	5	6
(France) J-F Caujolle (France) J Lovera	2	2
(Colombia) I Molina (Colombia) J Velasco	6	6
(Australia) J Bartlett (United States) N Holmes	4	4
(West Germany) J Fassbender (West Germany) H-J Pohmann	6	6

Second round
(United States) S Krulevitz (United States) S Turner	1	3
(Socialist Federal Republic of Yugoslavia) Ž Franulović (Socialist Federal Republic of Yugoslavia) N Pilić	6	6
(United States) M Cahill (United States) T Gullikson	0	4
(France) P Dominguez (France) F Jauffret	6	6
(Egypt) I El Shafei (New Zealand) B Fairlie	7	7
(Colombia) I Molina (Colombia) J Velasco	6	5
(Venezuela) J Andrew (Bolivia) R Benavides	6	2	3
(West Germany) J Fassbender (West Germany) H-J Pohmann	3	6	6

Third round
(Socialist Federal Republic of Yugoslavia) Ž Franulović (Socialist Federal Republic of Yugoslavia) N Pilić	4	6
(France) P Dominguez (France) F Jauffret	6	7
(Egypt) I El Shafei (New Zealand) B Fairlie	6	0
(West Germany) J Fassbender (West Germany) H-J Pohmann	7	6

Quarterfinals
(France) P Dominguez (France) F Jauffret	6	6
(West Germany) J Fassbender (West Germany) H-J Pohmann	2	2

==== Section 4 ====
First round
(France) H Gauvain (France) J-L Haillet	6	4
(Brazil) C Kirmayr (Brazil) JE Mandarino	7	6
(United States) V Amayai (United States) G Hardie	1	6	3
(France) T Bernasconi (France) P Hagelauer	6	2	6
(Czechoslovakia) J Hřebec (Czechoslovakia) T Šmíd	4	3
2	(United States) B Gottfried (Mexico) R Ramírez	6	6

Second round
(France) J-B Chanfreau (France) W N'Godrella	7	4	3
(Chile) P Cornejo (Chile) J Fillol	6	6	6
(Brazil) C Kirmayr (Brazil) JE Mandarino	4	3
(Italy) P Bertolucci (Italy) A Panatta	6	6
(France) T Bernasconi (France) P Hagelauer	4	0
(Australia) D Crealy (Australia) K Warwick	6	6
(Colombia) Á Betancur (West Germany) F Gebert	3	3
2	(United States) B Gottfried (Mexico) R Ramírez	6	6

Third round
(Chile) P Cornejo (Chile) J Fillol	4	6	6
(Italy) P Bertolucci (Italy) A Panatta	6	4	1
(Australia) D Crealy (Australia) K Warwick	3	1
2	(United States) B Gottfried (Mexico) R Ramírez	6	6

Quarterfinals
(Chile) P Cornejo (Chile) J Fillol	4	6
2	(United States) B Gottfried (Mexico) R Ramírez	6	7
