= 1975 Dutch Open – Singles =

Singles
- 1975 Dutch Open

Final
- Champion: (Argentina) Guillermo Vilas
- Runner-up: (Socialist Federal Republic of Yugoslavia) Željko Franulović
- Score: 6–4, 6–7, 6–2, 6–3

Details
- Draw: 32

Events
Singles	Doubles
← 1974 ·	Dutch Open	· 1976 →

The 1975 Dutch Open – Singles was an event of the 1975 Dutch Open tennis tournament and was played on outdoor clay courts at 't Melkhuisje in Hilversum in the Netherlands from 20 July until 27 July 1975. The draw comprised 32 players. Guillermo Vilas was the defending Dutch Open champion and retained his singles title by defeating Željko Franulović in the final, 6–4, 6–7, 6–2, 6–3.

== Draw ==
=== Key ===
- Q = Qualifier
- WC = Wild card
- LL = Lucky loser
- Alt = Alternate
- SE = Special exempt
- PR = Protected ranking
- ITF = ITF entry
- JE = Junior exempt
- w/o = Walkover
- r = Retired
- d = Defaulted
- SR = Special ranking

=== Finals ===
Semifinals
(Argentina) Guillermo Vilas	6	6	7
(Paraguay) Víctor Pecci	4	4	6
(West Germany) Ulrich Pinner	5	1	7
(Socialist Federal Republic of Yugoslavia) Željko Franulović	7	6	6

Final
(Argentina) Guillermo Vilas	6	6	6
(Socialist Federal Republic of Yugoslavia) Željko Franulović	4	7	2

=== Top half ===
First Round
(Argentina) Guillermo Vilas	3	6	6
(Switzerland) Petr Kanderal	6	2	2
(United Kingdom) John Lloyd	6	6	6
(Netherlands) Louk Sanders	2	7	2
(West Germany) Jürgen Fassbender	6	6	6
(United Kingdom) Martin Robinson	7	4	2
(Australia) Dick Crealy	6	3	6
(Argentina) Elio Lito Alvarez	3	6	3
(Egypt) Ismail El Shafei	6	6
(Colombia) Jairo Velasco Sr.	3	3
(Czechoslovakia) Milan Holeček	2	6	6
(Mexico) Marcello Lara	6	3	4
(Paraguay) Víctor Pecci	6	6
(Argentina) Julián Ganzábal	4	4
(Poland) Wojciech Fibak	6	4	6
(Australia) Barry Phillips-Moore	2	6	2

Second Round
(Argentina) Guillermo Vilas	6	6
(United Kingdom) John Lloyd	3	4
(West Germany) Jürgen Fassbender	3	7	8
(Australia) Dick Crealy	6	6	6
(Egypt) Ismail El Shafei	6	6	8
(Czechoslovakia) Milan Holeček	7	2	6
(Paraguay) Víctor Pecci	6	6	6
(Poland) Wojciech Fibak	7	4	3

Quarterfinals
(Argentina) Guillermo Vilas	6	6
(West Germany) Jürgen Fassbender	3	3
(Egypt) Ismail El Shafei	6	1
(Paraguay) Víctor Pecci	7	6

Semifinals
(Argentina) Guillermo Vilas	6	6	7
(Paraguay) Víctor Pecci	4	4	6

=== Bottom half ===
First Round
(West Germany) Ulrich Pinner	7	7
(Argentina) Tito Vázquez	6	5
(Colombia) Iván Molina	6	2	6
(France) Patrick Proisy	4	6	1
(Austria) Hans Kary	7	3	7
(France) Georges Goven	5	6	5
(Socialist Federal Republic of Yugoslavia) Nikola Špear	6	6
(United Kingdom) Roger Taylor	3	1
(Socialist Federal Republic of Yugoslavia) Željko Franulović	7	5	6
(France) Patrice Dominguez	6	7	2
(West Germany) Hans-Jürgen Pohmann	6	6
(Netherlands) Rolf Thung	4	2
(Socialist Federal Republic of Yugoslavia) Nikola Pilić	4	6	9
(Venezuela) Humphrey Hose	6	2	7
(France) François Jauffret	6	4	6
(United States) Norman Holmes	3	6	0

Second Round
(West Germany) Ulrich Pinner	6	6	7
(Colombia) Iván Molina	7	3	5
(Austria) Hans Kary	6	3	6
(Serbia) Nikola Špear	4	6	8
(Socialist Federal Republic of Yugoslavia) Željko Franulović	6	6
(West Germany) Hans-Jürgen Pohmann	0	2
(Socialist Federal Republic of Yugoslavia) Nikola Pilić	6	6	4
(France) François Jauffret	4	7	6

Quarterfinals
(West Germany) Ulrich Pinner	6	7
(Socialist Federal Republic of Yugoslavia) Nikola Špear	2	5
(Socialist Federal Republic of Yugoslavia) Željko Franulović	6	6
(France) François Jauffret	3	0

Semifinals
(West Germany) Ulrich Pinner	5	1	7
(Socialist Federal Republic of Yugoslavia) Željko Franulović	7	6	6
