= 1974 Dutch Open (tennis) =

- Date: 21–28 July
- Edition: 17th
- Category: Grand Prix (Group C)
- Draw: 32S / 16D
- Prize money: $50,000
- Surface: Clay / outdoor
- Location: Hilversum, Netherlands
- Venue: 't Melkhuisje

Champions

Singles
- (Argentina) Guillermo Vilas

Doubles
- (Argentina) Tito Vázquez / (Argentina) Guillermo Vilas
- Dutch Open

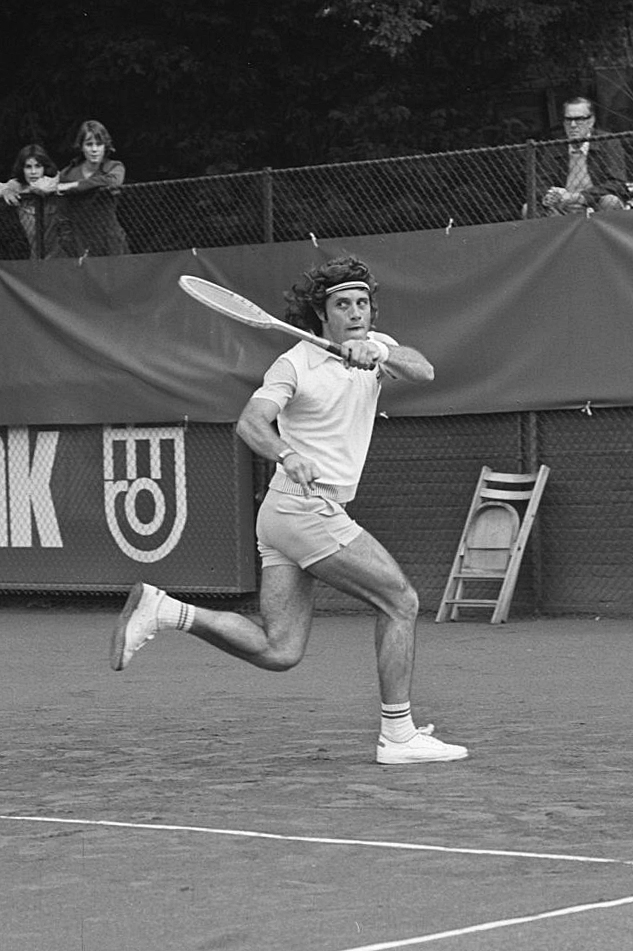
Argentinian tennis player Guillermo Vilas at the 1974 Dutch Open tournament.

The 1974 Dutch Open was a men's tennis tournament staged at 't Melkhuisje in Hilversum, Netherlands that was part of the Group C tier of the 1974 Commercial Union Assurance Grand Prix circuit. The tournament was played on outdoor clay courts and was held from 21 July until 28 July 1974. It was the 17th edition of the tournament. First-seeded Guillermo Vilas won the singles title and earned $5,000 first-prize money. For the first time no women's events were held.

== Finals ==
=== Singles ===
(Argentina) Guillermo Vilas defeated (Australia) Barry Phillips-Moore 6–4, 6–2, 1–6, 6–3

- It was Vilas' 2nd singles title of the year and the 3rd of his career.

=== Doubles ===
(Argentina) Tito Vázquez / (Argentina) Guillermo Vilas defeated (Argentina) Lito Álvarez / (Argentina) Julián Ganzábal 6–2, 3–6, 6–1, 6–2
