= 1972 ATP Buenos Aires – Singles =

Tennis tournament

Singles
- 1972 ATP Buenos Aires

Final
- Champion: (West Germany) Karl Meiler
- Runner-up: (Argentina) Guillermo Vilas
- Score: 6–7, 2–6, 6–4, 6–4, 6–4

Events
Singles	Doubles
- ATP Buenos Aires

Karl Meiler defeated Guillermo Vilas 6–7, 2–6, 6–4, 6–4, 6–4 to win the 1972 ATP Buenos Aires singles competition. Željko Franulović was the champion but did not defend his title.

== Draw ==
Key

- Q = Qualifier
- WC = Wild card
- LL = Lucky loser
- Alt = Alternate
- ITF = ITF entry
- PR = Protected ranking
- SR = Special ranking
- SE = Special exempt
- JE = Junior exempt
- JR = Junior Accelerator Programme entrant
- CO = College Accelerator Programme entrant
- NG = Next Gen Accelerator Program entrant
- w/o = Walkover
- r = Retired
- d = Defaulted

=== Final ===
Final
(West Germany) Karl Meiler	6	2	6	6	6
(Argentina) Guillermo Vilas	7	6	4	4	4

=== Section 1 ===
First round
(India) J Singh	6	6	7
(Argentina) N Herrero	2	4	5
(West Germany) K Meiler	6	6	6
(Argentina) L Soriano	3	0	4
(Argentina) J Ganzábal	6	6	6	6
(Argentina) C Junquet	1	4	7	3
(Spain) A Muñoz	6	6	6
(Argentina) L Álvarez	4	1	3
(New Zealand) O Parun	6	6	6	5
(Argentina) T Lynch	7	3	1	2^{r}
(Argentina) R Cano	2	2	6	6	6
(Chile) B Prajoux	6	6	2	3	4

Second round
(Australia) B Phillips-Moore	6	6	3	6	3
(India) J Singh	3	7	6	2	6
(Chile) J Pinto Bravo	2	5	1
(West Germany) K Meiler	6	7	6
(Argentina) J Ganzábal	2	7	6	2	6
(Spain) A Muñoz	6	6	1	6	2
(New Zealand) O Parun	6	6	2	6
(Argentina) R Cano	3	4	6	4

Quarterfinals
(India) J Singh	6	7	5	4
(West Germany) K Meiler	7	5	7	6
(Argentina) J Ganzábal	7	2	6	3	7
(New Zealand) O Parun	5	6	4	6	5

Semifinals
(West Germany) K Meiler	7	5	6	6	6
(Argentina) J Ganzábal	6	7	7	2	3

=== Section 2 ===
First round
(Chile) P Rodríguez	2	6	0	6	4
(Spain) J Guerrero	6	2	6	4	2^{r}
(Australia) B Lloyd	6	6	6
(Argentina) O Escribano	3	0	1
(Colombia) I Molina	7	6	7
(Paraguay) V Pecci	5	1	5
(Argentina) H Romani	2	3	1
(Ecuador) E Zuleta	6	6	6

Second round
(Argentina) G Vilas	6	6	6
(Chile) P Rodríguez	2	1	4
(South Africa) R Moore	6	2	6	6
(Australia) B Lloyd	2	6	3	0
(Czechoslovakia) J Kukal	3	7	3	2
(Colombia) I Molina	6	6	6	6
(Chile) J Fillol Sr.	6	7	6
(Argentina) H Romani	2	6	0

Quarterfinals
(Argentina) G Vilas	6	7	6
(South Africa) R Moore	2	6	0
(Colombia) I Molina	6	4	2	4
(Chile) J Fillol Sr.	3	6	6	6

Semifinals
(Argentina) G Vilas	6	6	6
(Chile) J Fillol Sr.	4	4	4
