= 1974 French Open – Men's doubles =

Men's doubles
- 1974 French Open

Final
- Champion: (Australia) Dick Crealy (New Zealand) Onny Parun
- Runner-up: (United States) Bob Lutz (United States) Stan Smith
- Score: 6–3, 6–2, 3–6, 5–7, 6–1

Details
- Draw: 64
- Seeds: 8

Events
Singles	men	women		boys	girls
Doubles	men	women	mixed	boys	girls
WC Singles	men	women	quad
WC Doubles	men	women	quad
Legends	−45	45+	women
← 1973 ·	French Open	· 1975 →

John Newcombe and Tom Okker were the defending champions but both players chose not to participate.

Dick Crealy and Onny Parun won in the final 6–3, 6–2, 3–6, 5–7, 6–1 against Bob Lutz and Stan Smith.

== Seeds ==
1. (United States) Bob Lutz / (United States) Stan Smith (final)
2. (Spain) Juan Gisbert / (Romania) Ilie Năstase (quarterfinals)
3. (United States) Brian Gottfried / (Mexico) Raúl Ramírez (second round, retired)
4. (West Germany) Jürgen Fassbender / (West Germany) Hans-Jürgen Pohmann (quarterfinals)
5. (Chile) Patricio Cornejo / (Chile) Jaime Fillol (second round)
6. (Sweden) Björn Borg / (Soviet Union) Alex Metreveli (semifinals)
7. (United States) Arthur Ashe / (United States) Roscoe Tanner (second round)
8. (United States) Tom Gorman / (United States) Marty Riessen (second round)

== Draw ==
=== Key ===
- Q = Qualifier
- WC = Wild card
- LL = Lucky loser
- Alt = Alternate
- ITF = ITF entry
- PR = Protected ranking
- SR = Special ranking
- SE = Special exempt
- JE = Junior exempt
- JR = Junior Accelerator Programme entrant
- CO = College Accelerator Programme entrant
- NG = Next Gen Accelerator Program entrant
- w/o = Walkover
- r = Retired
- d = Defaulted

=== Finals ===
Quarterfinals
2	(Spain) Juan Gisbert (Romania) Ilie Năstase	6	3	4
(Australia) Dick Crealy (New Zealand) Onny Parun	4	6	6
(Argentina) Tito Vázquez (Argentina) Guillermo Vilas	5	4
6	(Sweden) Björn Borg (Soviet Union) Alex Metreveli	7	6
(France) Patrice Beust (France) Daniel Contet	6	6
4	(West Germany) Jürgen Fassbender (West Germany) Hans-Jürgen Pohmann	4	2
(Japan) Kenichi Hirai (Japan) Toshiro Sakai	2	6	5
1	(United States) Bob Lutz (United States) Stan Smith	6	4	7

Semifinals
(Australia) Dick Crealy (New Zealand) Onny Parun	7	6
6	(Sweden) Björn Borg (Soviet Union) Alex Metreveli	5	0
(France) Patrice Beust (France) Daniel Contet	1	6	3
1	(United States) Bob Lutz (United States) Stan Smith	6	3	6

Final
(Australia) Dick Crealy (New Zealand) Onny Parun	6	6	3	5	6
1	(United States) Bob Lutz (United States) Stan Smith	3	2	6	7	1

=== Top half ===
==== Section 1 ====
First round
2	(Spain) J Gisbert (Romania) I Năstase	4	6	6
(France) P Joly (France) J Lovera	6	1	2
(United States) W Brown (United States) R Kreiss	w/o
(Brazil) T Koch (Denmark) T Ulrich
(France) B Hugon (France) B Sapène	5	3
(Soviet Union) T Kakulia (Soviet Union) A Volkov	7	6
(France) P Barthès (France) F Jauffret	6	6
(Mexico) R Chávez (Mexico) R Contreras	2	1
7	(United States) A Ashe (United States) R Tanner	7	6	6
(Hungary) S Baranyi (Hungary) P Szőke	6	7	1
(Egypt) I El Shafei (Socialist Federal Republic of Yugoslavia) Ž Franulović	6	7
(United States) G Pellizzi (United States) J Wade	1	6
(Italy) G Majoli (Italy) S Tacchini	2	7	3
(Australia) D Crealy (New Zealand) O Parun	6	5	6
(France) J-L Haillet (France) B Paul	2	6	3
(Mexico) L Baraldi (Mexico) E Reyes	6	4	6

Second round
2	(Spain) J Gisbert (Romania) I Năstase	6	6
(United States) W Brown (United States) R Kreiss	1	4
(Soviet Union) T Kakulia (Soviet Union) A Volkov	4	6	3
(France) P Barthès (France) F Jauffret	6	2	6
7	(United States) A Ashe (United States) R Tanner	5	6	8
(Egypt) I El Shafei (Socialist Federal Republic of Yugoslavia) Ž Franulović	7	4	10
(Australia) D Crealy (New Zealand) O Parun	6	6
(Mexico) L Baraldi (Mexico) E Reyes	1	4

Third round
2	(Spain) J Gisbert (Romania) I Năstase	6	4	6
(France) P Barthès (France) F Jauffret	4	6	3
(Egypt) I El Shafei (Socialist Federal Republic of Yugoslavia) Ž Franulović	3	6	6
(Australia) D Crealy (New Zealand) O Parun	6	3	8

Quarterfinals
2	(Spain) J Gisbert (Romania) I Năstase	6	3	4
(Australia) D Crealy (New Zealand) O Parun	4	6	6

==== Section 2 ====
First round
3	(United States) B Gottfried (Mexico) R Ramírez	7	6
(France) J-F Caujolle (France) É Deblicker	6	1
(Argentina) T Vázquez (Argentina) G Vilas	w/o
(Mexico) C López (Mexico) B Schon
(United States) P Gerken (United States) F McNair	6	6
(Venezuela) J Andrew (United States) S Krulevitz	4	2
(France) É Loliée (France) JL Thiebaut
(Australia) C Dibley (Mexico) M Lara	w/o
6	(Sweden) B Borg (Soviet Union) A Metreveli	2	7	6
(West Germany) H Elschenbroich (West Germany) H-J Plötz	6	6	1
(Poland) W Fibak (Poland) T Nowicki	4	5
(United States) E Dibbs (United States) H Solomon	6	7
(United States) J Barrao (United States) J da Torre
(United States) J Borowiak (United States) J McManus	w/o
(France) J-P Meyer (France) W N'Godrella	7	6
(Czechoslovakia) J Hřebec (Sweden) K Johansson	5	4

Second round
3	(United States) B Gottfried (Mexico) R Ramírez	6	0^{r}
(Argentina) T Vázquez (Argentina) G Vilas	7	3
(United States) P Gerken (United States) F McNair	7	6
(Australia) C Dibley (Mexico) M Lara	6	3
6	(Sweden) B Borg (Soviet Union) A Metreveli	2	6	8
(United States) E Dibbs (United States) H Solomon	6	0	6
(United States) J Borowiak (United States) J McManus	3	3
(France) J-P Meyer (France) W N'Godrella	6	6

Third round
(Argentina) T Vázquez (Argentina) G Vilas	6	6
(United States) P Gerken (United States) F McNair	2	3
6	(Sweden) B Borg (Soviet Union) A Metreveli	6	6
(France) J-P Meyer (France) W N'Godrella	3	4

Quarterfinals
(Argentina) T Vázquez (Argentina) G Vilas	5	4
6	(Sweden) B Borg (Soviet Union) A Metreveli	7	6

=== Bottom half ===
==== Section 3 ====
First round
(France) P Beust (France) D Contet	3	6	6
(Hungary) R Machán (Hungary) B Taróczy	6	4	3
(United States) D Dell (United States) S Stewart	6	6
(Monaco) L Borfiga (France) H Gauvain	3	1
(United States) C Pasarell (United States) E van Dillen	1	6	6
(Chile) JR Pinto Bravo (Chile) B Prajoux	6	1	4
(Chile) A Pakozdi (Czechoslovakia) J Šolc	1	2
5	(Chile) P Cornejo (Chile) J Fillol	6	6
(Czechoslovakia) J Kodeš (Czechoslovakia) V Zedník	6	3	10
(India) A Amritraj (India) V Amritraj	2	6	8
(Colombia) I Molina (Colombia) J Velasco	w/o
(France) M Boulle (Chile) P Rodríguez
(France) M Claitte (France) X Lemoine	0	2
(Spain) A Muñoz (Spain) M Orantes	6	6
(Czechoslovakia) F Pála (Czechoslovakia) J Písecký	5	2
4	(West Germany) J Fassbender (West Germany) H-J Pohmann	7	6

Second round
(France) P Beust (France) D Contet	2	6	6
(United States) D Dell (United States) S Stewart	6	4	3
(United States) C Pasarell (United States) E van Dillen	6	3	8
5	(Chile) P Cornejo (Chile) J Fillol	2	6	6
(Czechoslovakia) J Kodeš (Czechoslovakia) V Zedník	6	7	6
(Colombia) I Molina (Colombia) J Velasco	7	6	4
(Spain) A Muñoz (Spain) M Orantes	7	6	0
4	(West Germany) J Fassbender (West Germany) H-J Pohmann	6	7	6

Third round
(France) P Beust (France) D Contet	7	6
(United States) C Pasarell (United States) E van Dillen	6	3
(Czechoslovakia) J Kodeš (Czechoslovakia) V Zedník	6	2	3
4	(West Germany) J Fassbender (West Germany) H-J Pohmann	0	6	6

Quarterfinals
(France) P Beust (France) D Contet	6	6
4	(West Germany) J Fassbender (West Germany) H-J Pohmann	4	2

==== Section 4 ====
First round
(Argentina) J Ganzábal (Australia) P Kronk	6	6
(France) F Battegay (France) D Grozdanovitch	4	2
(Australia) G Kerr (Ecuador) E Zuleta
(France) J-B Chanfreau (France) G Goven	w/o
(France) E Huet (France) P Seghers	4	2
(Japan) K Hirai (Japan) T Sakai	6	6
(Morocco) O Laimina (France) J Thamin	4	5
8	(United States) T Gorman (United States) M Riessen	6	7
(France) T Bernasconi (France) P Hagelauer	7	6
(Bolivia) R Benavides (Bolivia) E Gorostiaga	6	4
(France) J-C Barclay (France) P Proisy	2	3
(Spain) J Higueras (Brazil) JE Mandarino	6	6
(France) P Dominguez (France) D Naegelen	w/o
(Italy) A Panatta (Italy) N Pietrangeli
(Israel) O Grundberg (Israel) F Kaplan	1	1
1	(United States) B Lutz (United States) S Smith	6	6

Second round
(Argentina) J Ganzábal (Australia) P Kronk	6	3	4
(France) J-B Chanfreau (France) G Goven	1	6	6
(Japan) K Hirai (Japan) T Sakai	6	6
8	(United States) T Gorman (United States) M Riessen	4	4
(France) T Bernasconi (France) P Hagelauer	2	6	4
(Spain) J Higueras (Brazil) JE Mandarino	6	2	6
(France) P Dominguez (France) D Naegelen	7	6	3
1	(United States) B Lutz (United States) S Smith	6	7	6

Third round
(France) J-B Chanfreau (France) G Goven	1	6
(Japan) K Hirai (Japan) T Sakai	6	7
(Spain) J Higueras (Brazil) JE Mandarino	7	2	8
1	(United States) B Lutz (United States) S Smith	6	6	10

Quarterfinals
(Japan) K Hirai (Japan) T Sakai	2	6	5
1	(United States) B Lutz (United States) S Smith	6	4	7
