= List of Argentina Davis Cup team representatives =

This is a list of tennis players who have represented the Argentina Davis Cup team in an official Davis Cup match. Argentina have taken part in the competition since 1921.

== Players ==
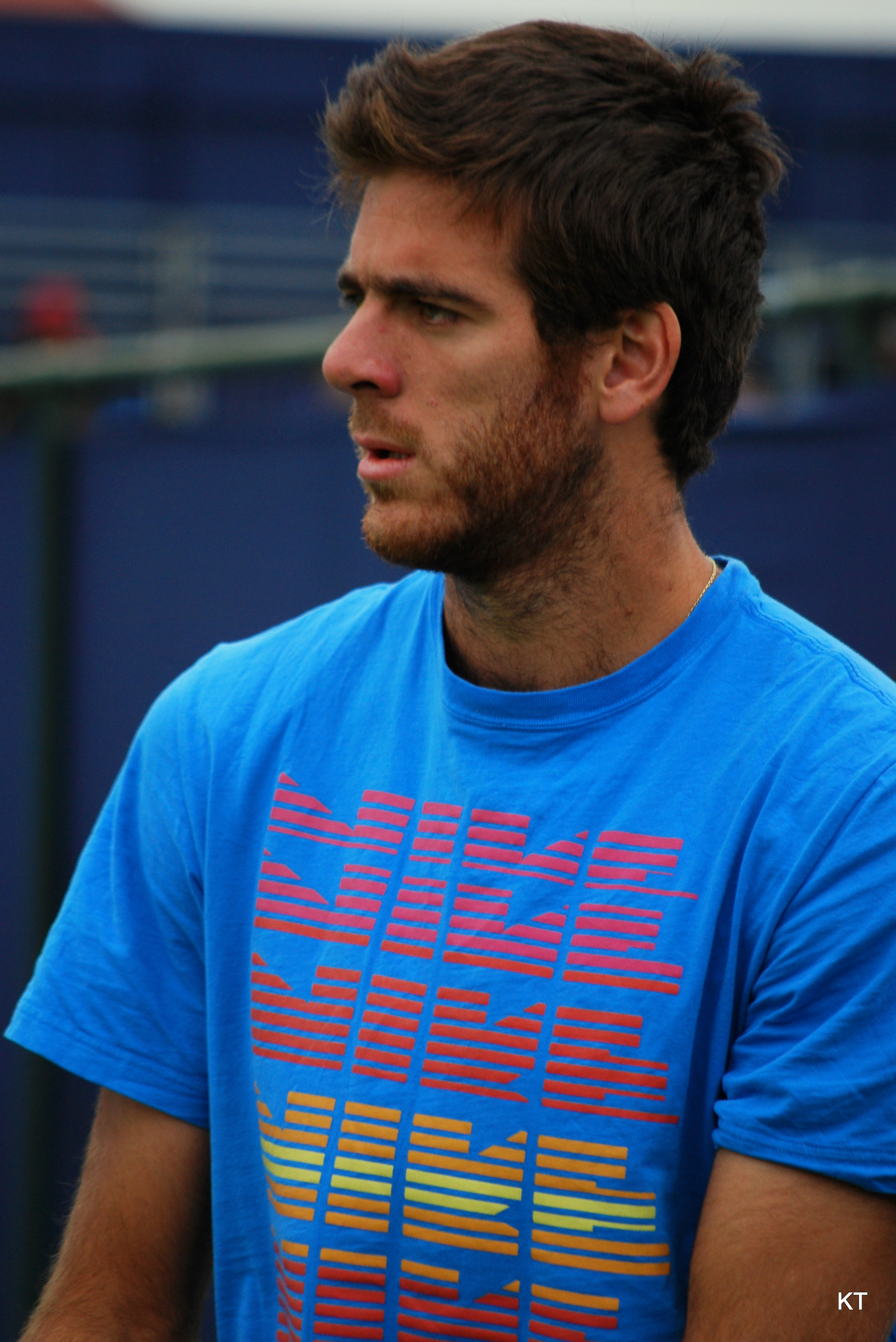
Juan Martín del Potro

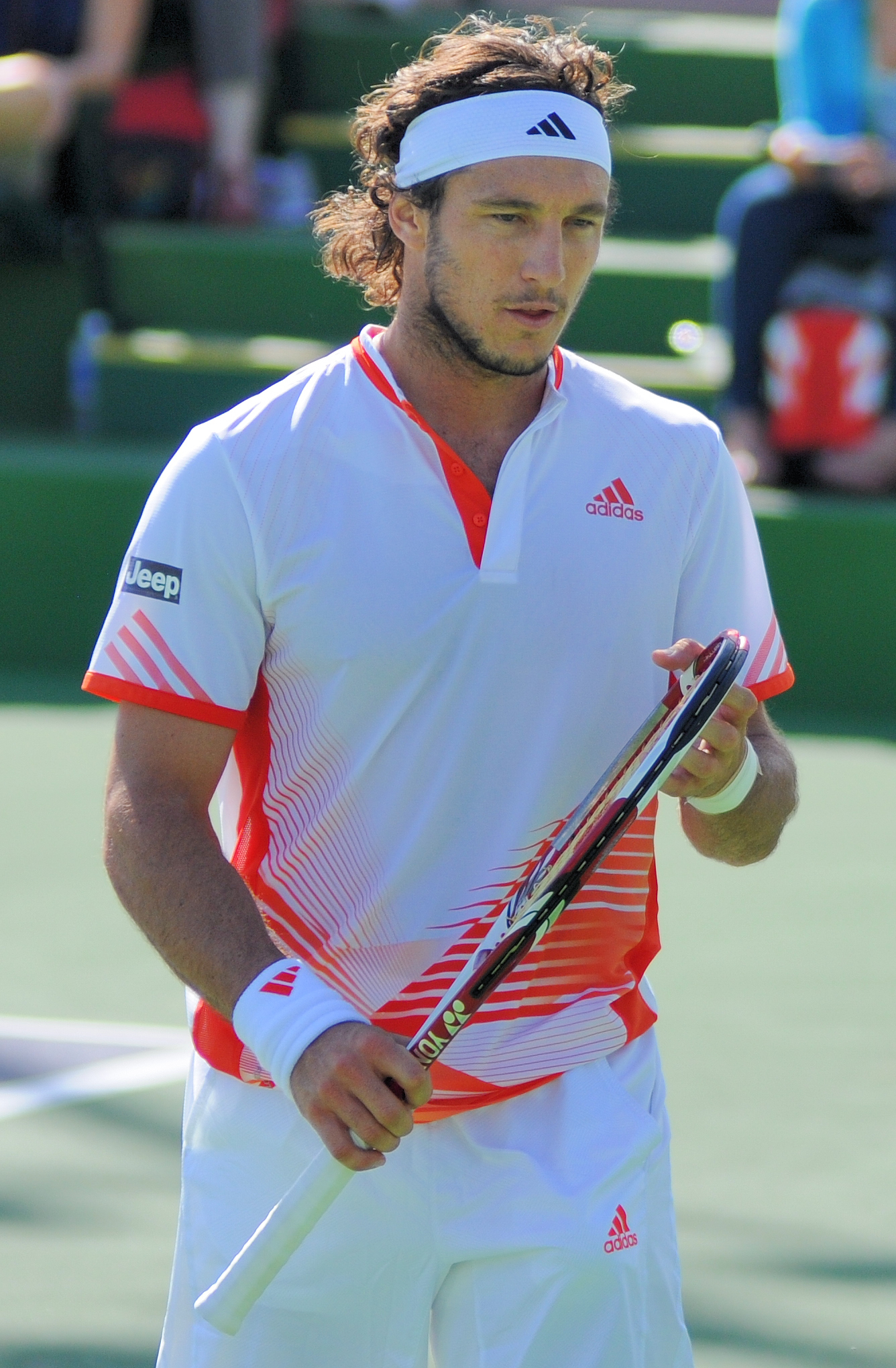
Juan Mónaco

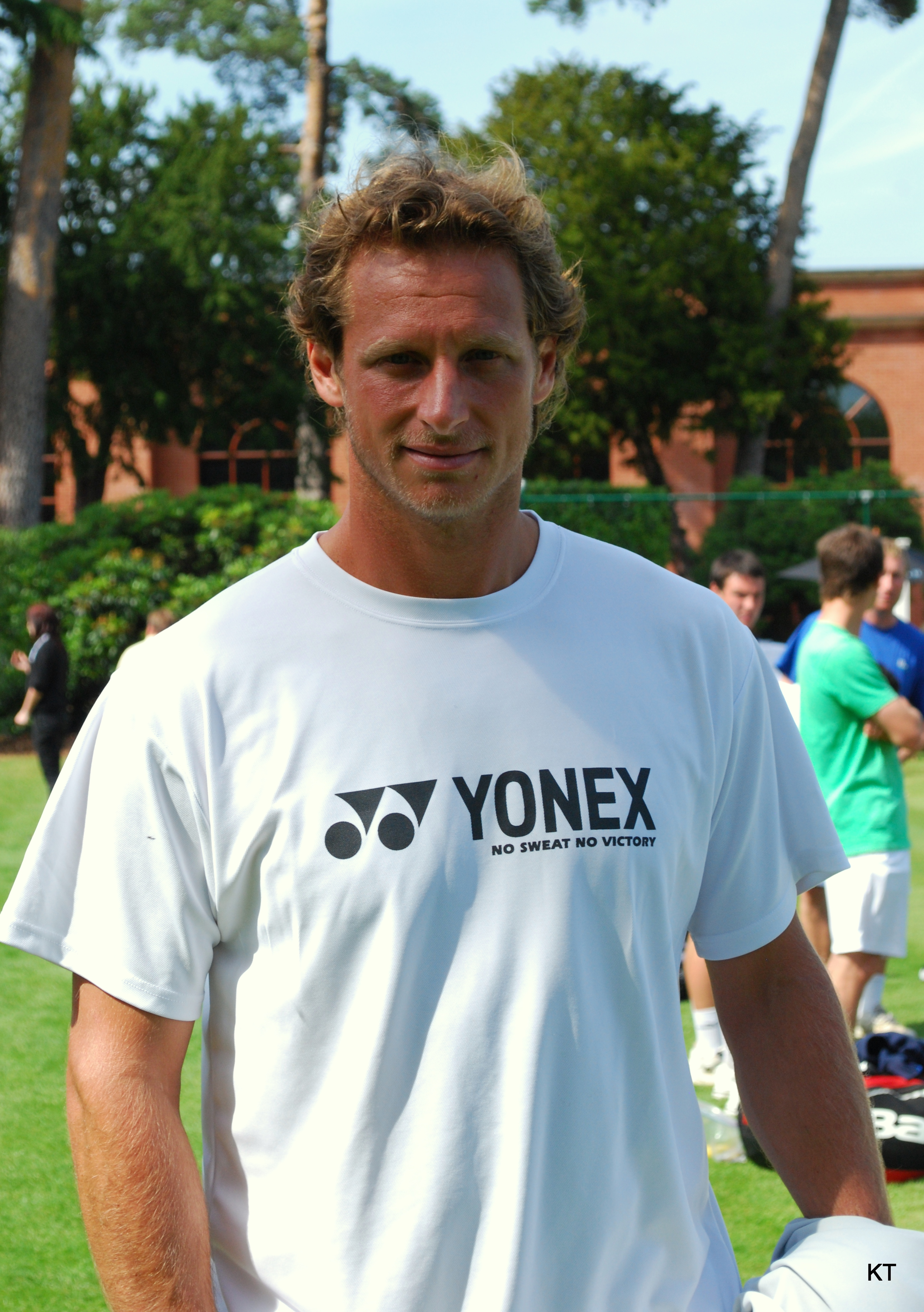
David Nalbandian

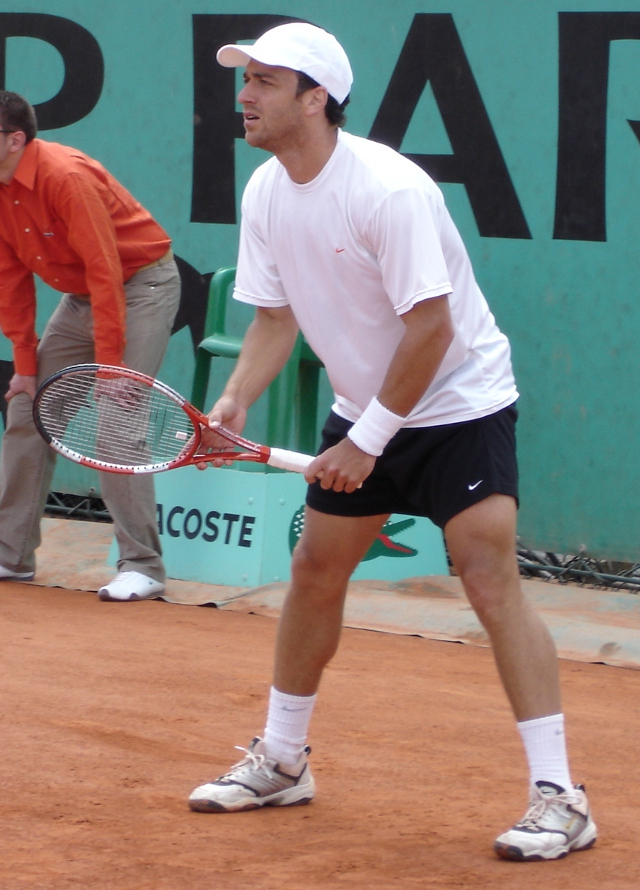
Franco Squillari

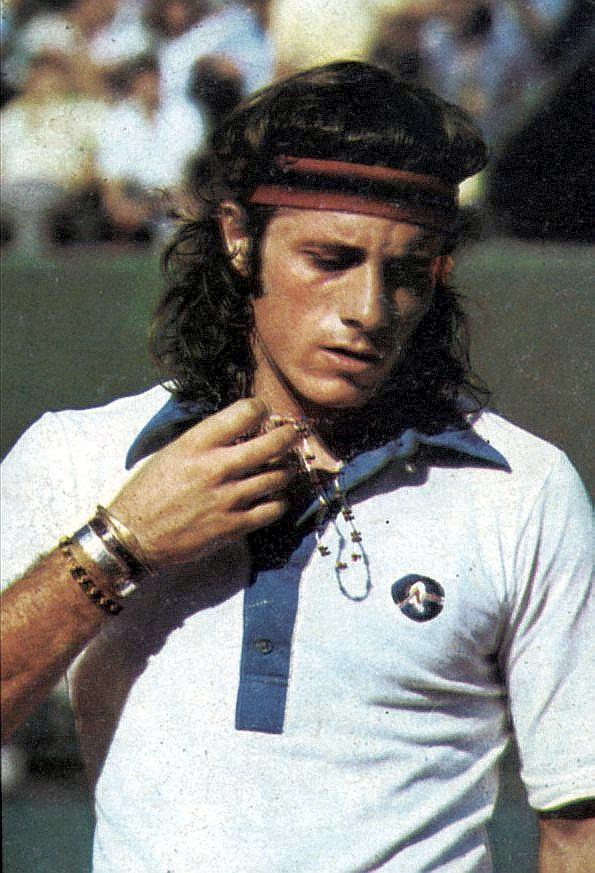
Guillermo Vilas

Player	W-L (Total)	W-L (Singles)	W-L (Doubles)	Ties	Debut
José Acasuso	7–5	5–3	2–2	9	2006
Pablo Albano	3–2	0–0	3–2	5	1993
Elio Álvarez	6–4	2–0	4–4	8	1970
Roberto Argüello	1–1	1–1	0–0	2	1983
Patricio Arnold	0–1	0–1	0–0	1	1995
Lucas Arnold Ker	13–4	3–1	10–3	14	1997
Roberto Aubone	12–12	6–9	6–3	9	1960
Eduardo Bengoechea	2–0	0–0	2–0	2	1986
Carlos Berlocq	10–10	7–6	3–4	11	2012
Ronaldo Boyd	4–5	4–4	0–1	4	1923
Federico Browne	0–1	0–1	0–0	1	1995
Agustín Calleri	14–7	8–4	6–3	14	2000
Carlos Caminos	0–2	0–2	0–0	1	1923
Guillermo Cañas	9–5	5–2	4–3	11	1998
Ricardo Cano	23–20	14–13	9–7	23	1971
Carlos Castellan	0–1	0–1	0–0	1	1982
Américo Cattaruzza	1–2	1–2	0–0	2	1933
Enrique Caviglia	1–0	1–0	0–0	1	1976
Marcelo Charpentier	0–1	0–1	0–0	1	1997
Juan Ignacio Chela	12–6	10–5	2–1	14	2000
José Luis Clerc	31–24	20–14	11–10	22	1977
Federico Coria	1–0	1–0	0–0	1	2021
Guillermo Coria	5–3	5–3	0–0	4	2004
Fernando Dalla Fontana	2–1	2–1	0–0	2	1977
Franco Davín	0–2	0–2	0–0	1	1995
Horacio de la Peña	7–5	5–5	2–0	7	1986
Lucilo del Castillo	9–4	6–2	3–2	7	1931
Juan Martín del Potro	16–6	15–4	1–2	13	2007
Federico Delbonis	5–4	5–3	0–1	6	2014
Adelmar Echeverria	0–1	0–0	0–1	1	1933
Gastón Etlis	1–1	1–1	0–0	1	1996
Javier Frana	18–19	9–8	9–11	20	1986
Julián Ganzábal	16–9	14–8	2–1	13	1967
Alejandro Ganzábal	0–3	0–2	0–1	3	1982
Martín García	2–2	0–1	2–1	3	2000
Carlos Gattiker	0–1	0–0	0–1	1	1980
Gastón Gaudio	13–3	13–3	0–0	9	2001
Máximo González	3–5	0–0	3–5	9	2017
Hernán Gumy	7–8	7–8	0–0	8	1996
Norberto Herrero	0–2	0–2	0–0	1	1968
Mariano Hood	1–1	0–0	1–1	2	1999
Martín Jaite	14–20	14–17	0–3	17	1984
Nicolás Kicker	0–1	0–1	0–0	1	2018
Luis Lobo	8–4	0–1	8–3	11	1995
Gustavo Luza	2–1	0–0	2–1	3	1989
Tomás Lynch	1–2	1–2	0–0	2	1971
Alberto Mancini	8–7	8–7	0–0	9	1989
Gabriel Markus	3–1	3–1	0–0	2	1992
Leonardo Mayer	15–9	11–4	4–5	16	2009
Christian Miniussi	4–8	0–1	4–7	11	1986
Juan Mónaco	11–13	11–12	0–1	17	2004
Enrique Morea	15–6	11–3	4–3	8	1948
David Nalbandian	39–11	23–6	16–5	26	2002
Enrique Obarrio	2–4	1–3	1–1	2	1926
Renzo Olivo	0–2	0–1	0–1	1	2016
Daniel Orsanic	0–1	0–0	0–1	1	1999
Guido Pella	8–6	7–5	1-1	11	2016
Guillermo Pérez Roldán	3–5	3–5	0–0	5	1988
Sebastián Prieto	1–3	0–1	1–2	4	1999
Mariano Puerta	8–3	5–2	3–1	6	1999
Ernesto Rios	1–0	1–0	0–0	1	1958
Guillermo Robson	8–8	5–5	3–3	9	1923
Martín Rodríguez	0–1	0–0	0–1	1	2000
Hector Romani	1–1	1–1	0–0	2	1972
Alejo Russell	7–6	3–4	4–2	6	1948
Roberto Saad	1–0	0–0	1–0	1	1986
Eduardo Schwank	7–7	1–4	6–3	10	2010
Diego Schwartzman	6–7	6–6	0–1	11	2015
Andres Sissener	1–0	0–0	1–0	1	1931
Eduardo Soriano	17–15	9–11	8–4	12	1958
Salvador Soriano	1–0	1–0	0–0	1	1952
Franco Squillari	10–2	10–2	0–0	7	1998
Jason Van Kerckhoven	1–0	1–0	0–0	1	1971
Martín Vassallo Argüello	2–0	1–0	1–0	1	2009
Tito Vázquez	2–2	1–1	1–1	2	1968
Guillermo Vilas	57–24	45–10	12–14	29	1970
Alfredo Villegas	0–1	0–0	0–1	1	1923
Heraldo Weiss	0–2	0–2	0–0	1	1948
Mariano Zabaleta	1–5	1–5	0–0	4	1999
Adriano Zappa	9–6	5–3	4–3	8	1931
Horacio Zeballos	8–6	2–1	6–5	12	2010
