= 1976 French Open – Men's singles =

Men's singles
- 1976 French Open

Final
- Champion: (Italy) Adriano Panatta
- Runner-up: (United States) Harold Solomon
- Score: 6–1, 6–4, 4–6, 7–6^{(7–3)}

Details
- Draw: 128
- Seeds: 16

Events
Singles	men	women		boys	girls
Doubles	men	women	mixed	boys	girls
WC Singles	men	women	quad
WC Doubles	men	women	quad
Legends	−45	45+	women
- French Open

Adriano Panatta defeated Harold Solomon in the final, 6–1, 6–4, 4–6, 7–6^{(7–3)} to win the men's singles tennis title at the 1976 French Open. It was his first and only major singles title, and he was the first Italian man in the Open Era to win a singles major. Panatta saved a match point en route to the title, against Pavel Huťka in the first round.

Björn Borg was the two-time defending champion, but lost in the quarterfinals to Panatta. This was just his second and last defeat at the French Open, both to Panatta.

== Seeds ==
The seeded players are listed below. Adriano Panatta is the champion; others show the round in which they were eliminated.

1. (Sweden) Björn Borg (quarterfinals)
2. (Argentina) Guillermo Vilas (quarterfinals)
3. (Spain) Manuel Orantes (quarterfinals)
4. (United States) Arthur Ashe (fourth round)
5. (Mexico) Raúl Ramírez (semifinals)
6. (United States) Eddie Dibbs (semifinals)
7. (United States) Harold Solomon (final)
8. (Italy) Adriano Panatta (champion)
9. n/a
10. (United States) Brian Gottfried (fourth round)
11. (Poland) Wojtek Fibak (fourth round)
12. (Australia) John Newcombe (first round)
13. (Czechoslovakia) Jan Kodeš (third round)
14. (Chile) Jaime Fillol Sr. (fourth round)
15. (Italy) Corrado Barazzutti (fourth round)
16. (France) François Jauffret (fourth round)

== Draw ==
Key

- Q = Qualifier
- WC = Wild card
- LL = Lucky loser
- Alt = Alternate
- ITF = ITF entry
- PR = Protected ranking
- SR = Special ranking
- SE = Special exempt
- JE = Junior exempt
- JR = Junior Accelerator Programme entrant
- CO = College Accelerator Programme entrant
- NG = Next Gen Accelerator Program entrant
- w/o = Walkover
- r = Retired
- d = Defaulted

=== Finals ===
Quarterfinals
2	(Argentina) Guillermo Vilas	1	6	6	1
7	(United States) Harold Solomon	6	0	7	6
(Hungary) Balázs Taróczy	6	6	6	1	5
5	(Mexico) Raúl Ramírez	4	7	3	6	7
6	(United States) Eddie Dibbs	6	3	6	6
3	(Spain) Manuel Orantes	3	6	3	3
8	(Italy) Adriano Panatta	6	6	2	7
1	(Sweden) Björn Borg	3	3	6	6

Semifinals
7	(United States) Harold Solomon	6	6	4	6	6
5	(Mexico) Raúl Ramírez	7	0	6	4	4
6	(United States) Eddie Dibbs	3	2	4
8	(Italy) Adriano Panatta	6	6	6

Final
7	(United States) Harold Solomon	1	4	6	6^{3}
8	(Italy) Adriano Panatta	6	6	4	7^{7}

=== Top half ===
==== Section 1 ====
First round
2	(Argentina) G Vilas	6	7	7
(Australia) D Crealy	3	6	5
(France) D Naegelen	6	6	6
(United States) S Turner	1	2	0
(United Kingdom) J Lloyd	4	4	6	7	3
(Chile) B Prajoux	6	6	3	5	6
(South Africa) B Bertram	4	6	7	2	6
(United States) J Delaney	6	4	5	6	3
15	(Italy) C Barazzutti	6	4	6	6
(France) E Deblicker	0	6	2	2
(France) J-L Haillet	4	3	7	6	6
Q	(France) D Contet	6	6	5	4	3
(Argentina) R Cano	5	6	6	6
(United States) M Cahill	7	3	1	1
Q	(Argentina) E Caviglia	6	6	4	6
(United States) G Hardie	1	3	6	4

Second round
2	(Argentina) G Vilas	6	6	6
(France) D Naegelen	4	1	1
(Chile) B Prajoux	6	2	6	6
(South Africa) B Bertram	4	6	4	0
15	(Italy) C Barazzutti	2	6	6	6
(France) J-L Haillet	6	1	0	0
(Argentina) R Cano	6	3	6	5	6
Q	(Argentina) E Caviglia	1	6	2	7	1

Third round
2	(Argentina) G Vilas	6	7	6
(Chile) B Prajoux	4	6	1
15	(Italy) C Barazzutti	4	6	6	6
(Argentina) R Cano	6	4	3	4

Fourth round
2	(Argentina) G Vilas	6	6	6
15	(Italy) C Barazzutti	2	2	3

==== Section 2 ====
First round
7	(United States) H Solomon	1	4	6	6	6
(Australia) K Warwick	6	6	4	1	2
(India) S Menon	7	4	6	6
Q	(France) P Hagelauer	5	6	2	4
(Sweden) K Johansson	6	3	6	3
(France) J-F Caujolle	3	6	7	6
(United States) J Andrews	4	4	6
(United Kingdom) G Battrick	6	6	7
10	(United States) B Gottfried	7	6	7
(Colombia) J Velasco Sr.	5	1	5
(Argentina) L Álvarez	7	4	7	7
Q	(Australia) B Lloyd	6	6	6	6
(Spain) J I Muntañola	1	0^{r}
(West Germany) U Pinner	6	1
(United States) J McManus	2	6	6	1
(Socialist Federal Republic of Yugoslavia) N Pilić	6	2	7	6

Second round
7	(United States) H Solomon	6	6	3	4	6
(India) S Menon	4	4	6	6	2
(France) J-F Caujolle	7	6	4	6
(United Kingdom) G Battrick	6	4	6	4
10	(United States) B Gottfried	3	6	7	6
(Argentina) L Álvarez	6	1	6	3
(West Germany) U Pinner	6	7	2	6
(Socialist Federal Republic of Yugoslavia) N Pilić	4	6	6	3

Third round
7	(United States) H Solomon	6	6	6
(France) J-F Caujolle	4	3	1
10	(United States) B Gottfried	7	6	6
(West Germany) U Pinner	6	3	0

Fourth round
7	(United States) H Solomon	1	7	6	6
10	(United States) B Gottfried	6	5	3	2

==== Section 3 ====
First round
4	(United States) A Ashe	7	6	7
(United States) G R Reid	6	3	5
(Australia) J Bartlett	0	2	4
(South Africa) R Moore	6	6	6
(West Germany) J Fassbender	7	6	6
(India) A Amritraj	6	1	3
(Australia) C Kachel	7	6	6	3	3
(United States) C Pasarell	5	4	7	6	6
13	(Czechoslovakia) J Kodeš	4	7	6	6	6
(France) P Dominguez	6	6	7	0	0
(South Africa) J Yuill	6	2	1
(Czechoslovakia) F Pála	7	6	6
(Rhodesia) C Dowdeswell	2	6	5	2
(Hungary) B Taróczy	6	2	7	6
(United States) B Martin	3	6	6	7
(Japan) J Kamiwazumi	6	0	4	5

Second round
4	(United States) A Ashe	6	6	1	6
(South Africa) R Moore	4	4	6	3
(West Germany) J Fassbender	6	6	7	1	6
(United States) C Pasarell	2	7	6	6	3
13	(Czechoslovakia) J Kodeš	6	6	6
(Czechoslovakia) F Pála	3	2	1
(Hungary) B Taróczy	6	6	6
(United States) B Martin	2	4	3

Third round
4	(United States) A Ashe	6	6	6
(West Germany) J Fassbender	1	1	2
13	(Czechoslovakia) J Kodeš	4	2	1
(Hungary) B Taróczy	6	6	6

Fourth round
4	(United States) A Ashe	7	6	2	0	4
(Hungary) B Taróczy	5	2	6	6	6

==== Section 4 ====
First round
5	(Mexico) R Ramírez	6	6	6
(Spain) A Giménez	2	3	1
(United Kingdom) B Mottram	6	7	6
(United States) D Dell	1	5	1
Q	(Monaco) L Borfiga	0	6	6	3	1
(Czechoslovakia) M Holeček	6	2	4	6	6
(United States) S Krulevitz	6	6	6
(Czechoslovakia) V Zednik	2	0	3
12	(Australia) J Newcombe	6	6	5	4
(Spain) J Gisbert Sr	2	7	7	6
(United States) E Van Dillen	6	6	7
(United Kingdom) R Taylor	3	4	5
(Brazil) J Mandarino	6	1	7	6
(Socialist Federal Republic of Yugoslavia) N Špear	3	6	5	2
(Belgium) B Mignot	6	6	6
(Italy) P Bertolucci	2	2	4

Second round
5	(Mexico) R Ramírez	6	6	6
(United Kingdom) B Mottram	3	0	2
(Czechoslovakia) M Holeček	3	1	6	3
(United States) S Krulevitz	6	6	4	6
(Spain) J Gisbert Sr	6	6	7
(United States) E Van Dillen	4	2	6
(Brazil) J Mandarino	6	5	1	7	0
(Belgium) B Mignot	1	7	6	5	6

Third round
5	(Mexico) R Ramírez	6	6	6
(United States) S Krulevitz	4	0	0
(Spain) J Gisbert Sr	4	2	6	6	0
(Belgium) B Mignot	6	6	3	4	6

Fourth round
5	(Mexico) R Ramírez	6	6	6
(Belgium) B Mignot	2	1	1

=== Bottom half ===
==== Section 5 ====
First round
(Bolivia) R Benavides	6	6	6
(Australia) C Dibley	4	4	3
Q	(West Germany) F Gebert	3	4	7	6	6
Q	(France) R Brunet	6	6	5	3	1
(United Kingdom) M Robinson	0	6	1	1
(France) P Proisy	6	2	6	6
LL	(West Germany) R Gehring	6	2	7	3	1
11	(Poland) W Fibak	3	6	6	6	6
(United States) V Amaya	3	6	7	7
(France) P Beust	6	3	6	5
(West Germany) H-J Plötz	6	0	6	7
(Australia) G Masters	2	6	1	5
(West Germany) H Pohmann	1	6	6	7
(Venezuela) J Andrew	6	1	3	5
(West Germany) K Meiler	5	3	1
6	(United States) E Dibbs	7	6	6

Second round
(Bolivia) R Benavides	3	2	7	6	5
Q	(West Germany) F Gebert	6	6	6	0	7
(France) P Proisy	4	6	2	3
11	(Poland) W Fibak	6	1	6	6
(United States) V Amaya	6	6	6
(West Germany) H-J Plötz	3	3	4
(West Germany) H Pohmann	3	5	1
6	(United States) E Dibbs	6	7	6

Third round
Q	(West Germany) F Gebert	1	2	2
11	(Poland) W Fibak	6	6	6
(United States) V Amaya	5	4	6	3
6	(United States) E Dibbs	7	6	2	6

Fourth round
11	(Poland) W Fibak	6	7	3	4
6	(United States) E Dibbs	7	5	6	6

==== Section 6 ====
First round
(United States) S Stewart	6	3	5	6	6
Q	(Italy) G Ocleppo	0	6	7	4	3
Q	(United Kingdom) R Lewis	2	2	2
(Italy) M Di Domenico	6	6	6
(Australia) A Gardiner	1	3	3
(Czechoslovakia) T Šmid	6	6	6
(Brazil) C Kirmayr	2	2	4
14	(Chile) J Fillol Sr.	6	6	6
(Argentina) J Ganzábal	6	6	6
(Colombia) I Molina	3	3	3
(United States) T Waltke	4	0	6	7	8
(France) G Goven	6	6	1	6	6
(Spain) A Muñoz	6	5	6	6	8
Q	(Hungary) J Benyik	7	7	3	2	6
(United States) N Holmes	2	2	1
3	(Spain) M Orantes	6	6	6

Second round
(United States) S Stewart	6	6	6
(Italy) M Di Domenico	2	4	4
(Czechoslovakia) T Šmid	0	4	0
14	(Chile) J Fillol Sr.	6	6	6
(Argentina) J Ganzábal	5	7	6	6
(United States) T Waltke	7	5	0	1
(Spain) A Muñoz	6	3	4	1
3	(Spain) M Orantes	2	6	6	6

Third round
(United States) S Stewart	7	6	3	1	1
14	(Chile) J Fillol Sr.	6	3	6	6	6
(Argentina) J Ganzábal	0	3	4
3	(Spain) M Orantes	6	6	6

Fourth round
14	(Chile) J Fillol Sr.	6	2	3
3	(Spain) M Orantes	7	6	6

==== Section 7 ====
First round
(Australia) B Carmichael	3	2	5
(Socialist Federal Republic of Yugoslavia) Z Franulović	6	6	7
LL	(Sweden) R Norberg	6	7	6
(United States) T Gorman	4	6	2
(South Africa) P Cramer	3	2	5
(Australia) B Phillips-Moore	6	6	7
Q	(Monaco) B Balleret	2	2	2
(United States) F McNair	6	6	6
(United States) T Gullikson	2	4	6	6	5
(Czechoslovakia) J Hřebec	6	6	4	3	7
(Australia) M Edmondson	3	3	6	3
(Paraguay) V Pecci Sr.	6	6	3	6
(Japan) J Kuki	6	7	6	7
(Sweden) B Andersson	1	5	7	5
(Czechoslovakia) P Huťka	6	2	2	6	10
8	(Italy) A Panatta	2	6	6	0	12

Second round
(Socialist Federal Republic of Yugoslavia) Z Franulović	6	6	7
LL	(Sweden) R Norberg	2	4	6
(Australia) B Phillips-Moore	3	6	3	6	6
(United States) F McNair	6	4	6	0	3
(Czechoslovakia) J Hřebec	4	6	6	6
(Paraguay) V Pecci Sr.	6	3	4	2
(Japan) J Kuki	3	1	5
8	(Italy) A Panatta	6	6	7

Third round
(Socialist Federal Republic of Yugoslavia) Z Franulović	3	7	6	4	6
(Australia) B Phillips-Moore	6	6	2	6	4
(Czechoslovakia) J Hřebec	5	3	4
8	(Italy) A Panatta	7	6	6

Fourth round
(Socialist Federal Republic of Yugoslavia) Z Franulović	2	2	7	3
8	(Italy) A Panatta	6	6	6	6

==== Section 8 ====
First round
(Chile) P Cornejo	6	3	6	6
(United States) H Bunis	1	6	2	2
Q	(France) C Roger-Vasselin	2	1	2
(Spain) J Higueras	6	6	6
Q	(Colombia) A Betancur	6	7	7
(France) H Gauvain	4	6	5
(Egypt) I El Shafei	2	7	3	2
16	(France) F Jauffret	6	5	6	6
(France) W N'Godrella	6	2	4	4
LL	(New Zealand) R Simpson	3	6	6	6
(United Kingdom) J Feaver	6	6	2	3	4
(Italy) T Zugarelli	0	1	6	6	6
(Austria) H Kary	3	6	5	6	6
(France) P Barthes	6	4	7	4	2
Q	(France) D Bedel	6	0	4	5
1	(Sweden) B Borg	0	6	6	7

Second round
(Chile) P Cornejo	2	5	4
(Spain) J Higueras	6	7	6
Q	(Colombia) A Betancur	6	6	3	3	2
16	(France) F Jauffret	4	1	6	6	6
LL	(New Zealand) R Simpson	3	3	4
(Italy) T Zugarelli	6	6	6
(Austria) H Kary	1	1	2
1	(Sweden) B Borg	6	6	6

Third round
(Spain) J Higueras	5	6	7	4	2^{d}
16	(France) F Jauffret	7	2	6	6	1
(Italy) T Zugarelli	3	4	4
1	(Sweden) B Borg	6	6	6

Fourth round
16	(France) F Jauffret	4	2	6	6	8
1	(Sweden) B Borg	6	6	3	4	10

Preceded by 1976 Australian Open	Grand Slam men's singles	Succeeded by 1976 Wimbledon Championships
