= 1974 French Open – Men's singles =

Men's singles
- 1974 French Open

Final
- Champion: (Sweden) Björn Borg
- Runner-up: (Spain) Manuel Orantes
- Score: 2–6, 6–7^{(4–7)}, 6–0, 6–1, 6–1

Details
- Draw: 128
- Seeds: 16

Events
Singles	men	women		boys	girls
Doubles	men	women	mixed	boys	girls
WC Singles	men	women	quad
WC Doubles	men	women	quad
Legends	−45	45+	women
- French Open

Björn Borg defeated Manuel Orantes in the final, 2–6, 6–7^{(4–7)}, 6–0, 6–1, 6–1 to win the men's singles tennis title at the 1974 French Open. It was his first major title, the first of an eventual six French Open titles, and the first of eleven major titles overall. This was the first time in the Open Era that a player came back from two-sets-to-love down in a major final.

Ilie Năstase was the defending champion, but lost in the quarterfinals to Harold Solomon.

Jimmy Connors was barred from participating in the tournament due to his activity in World TeamTennis. He won all of the other three majors during the year: the Australian Open, Wimbledon Championships, and US Open.

The first two rounds of the tournament were played as best-of-three sets, while the last five rounds were played as best-of-five sets.

== Seeds ==
The seeded players are listed below. Björn Borg is the champion; others show the round in which they were eliminated.

1. (Romania) Ilie Năstase (quarterfinals)
2. (Czechoslovakia) Jan Kodeš (fourth round)
3. (Sweden) Björn Borg (champion)
4. (United States) Arthur Ashe (fourth round)
5. (United States) Tom Gorman (second round)
6. (United States) Stan Smith (first round)
7. (Italy) Adriano Panatta (second round)
8. (Soviet Union) Alex Metreveli (second round)
9. (Mexico) Raúl Ramírez (quarterfinals)
10. (France) François Jauffret (semifinals)
11. (Italy) Paolo Bertolucci (first round)
12. (United States) Eddie Dibbs (fourth round)
13. (United States) Marty Riessen (fourth round)
14. (Spain) Manuel Orantes (final)
15. (United States) Brian Gottfried (second round)
16. (Chile) Jaime Fillol Sr. (fourth round)

== Draw ==
=== Key ===
- Q = Qualifier
- WC = Wild card
- LL = Lucky loser
- r = Retired

=== Finals ===
Quarterfinals
10	(France) François Jauffret	7	6	6
(West Germany) Hans-Jürgen Pohmann	6	3	2
14	(Spain) Manuel Orantes	6	6	6
(Chile) Patricio Cornejo	3	3	1
9	(Mexico) Raúl Ramírez	2	7	6	2	3
3	(Sweden) Björn Borg	6	5	4	6	6
(United States) Harold Solomon	6	6	0	3	6
1	(Romania) Ilie Năstase	4	4	6	6	4

Semifinals
10	(France) François Jauffret	2	4	4
14	(Spain) Manuel Orantes	6	6	6
3	(Sweden) Björn Borg	6	2	6	6
(United States) Harold Solomon	4	6	2	1

Final
14	(Spain) Manuel Orantes	6	7^{7}	0	1	1
3	(Sweden) Björn Borg	2	6^{4}	6	6	6

=== Top half ===
==== Section 1 ====
First round
2	(Czechoslovakia) Kodeš	6	6
(United States) Kreiss	2	2
(France) Chanfreau	6	6
(West Germany) Elschenbroich	3	4
(India) Amritraj	5	7	6
(Chile) Prajoux	7	5	3
(Belgium) Hombergen	7	2	3
(United States) McNair	6	6	6
10	(France) Jauffret	3	6	7
(Poland) Nowicki	6	4	5
(Chile) Rodríguez	3	1
(Argentina) Ganzábal	6	6
(New Zealand) Simpson	4	4
(Hungary) Taróczy	6	6
Q	(Venezuela) Andrew	6	4	4
(Argentina) T Vázquez	2	6	6

Second round
2	(Czechoslovakia) Kodeš	7	6
(France) Chanfreau	5	3
(India) Amritraj	7	3	6
(United States) McNair	5	6	3
10	(France) Jauffret	6	6
(Argentina) Ganzábal	2	2
(Hungary) Taróczy	6	6
(Argentina) T Vázquez	3	2

Third round
2	(Czechoslovakia) Kodeš	6	6	6
(India) Amritraj	2	2	2
10	(France) Jauffret	6	6	6
(Hungary) Taróczy	2	1	4

Fourth round
2	(Czechoslovakia) Kodeš	6	5	5
10	(France) Jauffret	7	7	7

==== Section 2 ====
First round
7	(Italy) Panatta	6	2
(Socialist Federal Republic of Yugoslavia) Jovanović	4	1	r
(Australia) Hancock	5	5
(West Germany) Pohmann	7	7
Q	(Romania) Marcu	3	2
(South Africa) Yuill	6	6
(United States) Dell	2	2
Q	(France) Lovera	6	6
12	(United States) Dibbs	6	6
(France) Dominguez	3	2
(Belgium) Mignot	4	4
(West Germany) Plötz	6	6
(Italy) Barazzutti	6	7	6
(Czechoslovakia) Pála	7	5	2
(Australia) Kronk	6	6
Q	(France) Leclercq	3	0

Second round
7	(Italy) Panatta	7	3	0
(West Germany) Pohmann	5	6	6
(South Africa) Yuill	6	2	6
Q	(France) Lovera	2	6	4
12	(United States) Dibbs	6	6
(West Germany) Plötz	2	3
(Italy) Barazzutti	6	6
(Australia) Kronk	3	4

Third round
(West Germany) Pohmann	6	4	6	7
(South Africa) Yuill	2	6	4	6
12	(United States) Dibbs	6	6	7
(Italy) Barazzutti	0	1	6

Fourth round
(West Germany) Pohmann	6	6	4	6
12	(United States) Dibbs	3	3	6	3

==== Section 3 ====
First round
4	(United States) Ashe	7	3	6
(Colombia) Molina	5	6	3
(United States) Stewart	2	3
Q	(Japan) Kuki	6	6
(West Germany) Pinner	4	2
(Australia) Dibley	6	6
(Spain) Muñoz	6	6
(Hungary) Baranyi	3	4
14	(Spain) Orantes	6	6
(Chile) Pinto-Bravo	2	0
(India) Amritraj	1	4
(Italy) Zugarelli	6	6
(Czechoslovakia) Holeček	1	3
(Argentina) Vilas	6	6
(United States) Faulk	1	5
(Australia) Crealy	6	7

Second round
4	(United States) Ashe	6	6
Q	(Japan) Kuki	2	1
(Australia) Dibley	6	4
(Spain) Muñoz	7	6
14	(Spain) Orantes	6	6
(Italy) Zugarelli	4	1
(Argentina) Vilas	6	6
(Australia) Crealy	4	4

Third round
4	(United States) Ashe	4	6	6	6
(Spain) Muñoz	6	1	3	4
14	(Spain) Orantes	3	3	7	6	6
(Argentina) Vilas	6	6	6	3	2

Fourth round
4	(United States) Ashe	1	2	2
14	(Spain) Orantes	6	6	6

==== Section 4 ====
First round
6	(United States) Smith	6	4	6
(Japan) Kamiwazumi	3	6	8
(West Germany) Fassbender	6	6
Q	(Pakistan) Iqbal	2	1
(United Kingdom) Feaver	7	1	2
(Chile) Cornejo	6	6	6
Q	(France) Bernasconi	4	6	3
(Sweden) Johansson	6	4	6
16	(Chile) Fillol Sr.	5	6	6
Q	(France) Gauvain	7	4	1
(United States) Pasarell	7	7
(Soviet Union) Volkov	6	6
(Rhodesia) Dowdeswell	3	6
(France) Deblicker	6	7
(West Germany) Korpás	6	6
(Hungary) Szőke	4	2

Second round
(Japan) Kamiwazumi	2	6
(West Germany) Fassbender	6	7
(Chile) Cornejo	6	6
(Sweden) Johansson	3	1
16	(Chile) Fillol Sr.	6	6
(United States) Pasarell	1	1
(France) Deblicker	2	5
(West Germany) Korpás	6	7

Third round
(West Germany) Fassbender	1	2	4
(Chile) Cornejo	6	6	6
16	(Chile) Fillol Sr.	6	7	6
(West Germany) Korpás	1	6	1

Fourth round
(Chile) Cornejo	6	7	4	5	6
16	(Chile) Fillol Sr.	2	6	6	7	4

=== Bottom half ===
==== Section 5 ====
First round
(United States) Lutz	5	2
(Egypt) El Shafei	7	6
(United Kingdom) Lloyd	2	5
(France) Proisy	6	7
(Switzerland) Kanderal	3	6	9
(South Africa) Cramer	6	2	7
(Italy) Franchitti	0	0
9	(Mexico) Ramírez	6	6
(Australia) Thomson	4	1
(Czechoslovakia) Zednik	6	6
Q	(Bolivia) Benavides	3	6	0
(Japan) Sakai	6	3	6
(Brazil) Koch	6	6
(France) N'Godrella	4	2
(Colombia) Velasco Sr.	3	6
5	(United States) Gorman	6	7

Second round
(Egypt) El Shafei	4	0
(France) Proisy	6	6
(Switzerland) Kanderal	3	2
9	(Mexico) Ramírez	6	6
(Czechoslovakia) Zednik	4	3
(Japan) Sakai	6	6
(Brazil) Koch	6	4	6
5	(United States) Gorman	2	6	4

Third round
(France) Proisy	4	4	6	3
9	(Mexico) Ramírez	6	6	4	6
(Japan) Sakai	1	7	6	4	4
(Brazil) Koch	6	6	4	6	6

Fourth round
9	(Mexico) Ramírez	6	6	4	7
(Brazil) Koch	3	1	6	5

==== Section 6 ====
First round
(France) Contet	4	4
(Czechoslovakia) Písecký	6	6
(Italy) Toci	2	2
(United States) Van Dillen	6	6
(Australia) Phillips-Moore	6	6
(Mexico) Lara	1	0
(United States) Brown	6	5	6
11	(Italy) Bertolucci	4	7	2
Q	(France) Joly	3	4
(France) Rouyer	6	6
Q	(France) Hagelauer	3	5
(Soviet Union) Kakulia	6	7
(Romania) Ovici	6	6
Q	(Argentina) Álvarez	2	3
Q	(France) Caujolle	6	0	4
3	(Sweden) Borg	4	6	6

Second round
(Czechoslovakia) Písecký	6	6
(United States) Van Dillen	7	7
(Australia) Phillips-Moore	6	4	6
(United States) Brown	1	6	1
(France) Rouyer	2	6	6
(Soviet Union) Kakulia	6	2	1
(Romania) Ovici	1	1
3	(Sweden) Borg	6	6

Third round
(United States) Van Dillen	3	6	6	6
(Australia) Phillips-Moore	6	2	0	4
(France) Rouyer	4	2	0
3	(Sweden) Borg	6	6	6

Fourth round
(United States) Van Dillen	6	3	3	7	3
3	(Sweden) Borg	0	6	6	5	6

==== Section 7 ====
First round
(Spain) Higueras	6	6
(Brazil) Mandarino	4	4
(United States) McManus	0	0	r
(France) Barclay	6	2
(United States) Krulevitz	3	2
(United States) Borowiak	6	6
(Austria) Kary	6	4	3
13	(United States) Riessen	1	6	6
(United States) Solomon	1	6	6
Q	(Hungary) Machán	6	4	2
Q	(Paraguay) Pecci Sr.	6	4
(United States) Gerken	7	6
Q	(Morocco) Laimina	6	5	5
(Socialist Federal Republic of Yugoslavia) Franulović	4	7	7
(Spain) Gisbert Sr	3	6
8	(Soviet Union) Metreveli	6	7

Second round
(Spain) Higueras	6	3	6
(France) Barclay	1	6	3
(United States) Borowiak	4	0
13	(United States) Riessen	6	6
(United States) Solomon	6	6
(United States) Gerken	2	2
(Socialist Federal Republic of Yugoslavia) Franulović	6	2	6
8	(Soviet Union) Metreveli	4	6	1

Third round
(Spain) Higueras	1	3	5
13	(United States) Riessen	6	6	7
(United States) Solomon	5	7	4	6	6
(Socialist Federal Republic of Yugoslavia) Franulović	7	6	6	3	2

Fourth round
13	(United States) Riessen	2	1	1
(United States) Solomon	6	6	6

==== Section 8 ====
First round
(France) Barthes	6	6
(South Africa) Ryan	2	1
(Czechoslovakia) Hřebec	6	6
(West Germany) Meiler	4	1
(Italy) Di Matteo	2	6	4
(New Zealand) Parun	6	1	6
15	(United States) Gottfried	4	6	6
(Sweden) Svensson	6	1	2
(France) Goven	7	4	9
(United States) Tanner	5	6	7
(Jamaica) Russell	6	5	6
(United Kingdom) Paish	4	7	4
(Australia) Keldie	w/o
(Sweden) Johansson
LL	(France) Claitte	0	2
1	(Romania) Năstase	6	6

Second round
(France) Barthes	6	6
(Czechoslovakia) Hřebec	2	1
(New Zealand) Parun	1	7	6
15	(United States) Gottfried	6	6	4
(France) Goven	6	6
(Jamaica) Russell	3	3
(Sweden) Johansson	0	1
1	(Romania) Năstase	6	6

Third round
(France) Barthes	6	6	1	2	4
(New Zealand) Parun	2	3	6	6	6
(France) Goven	4	2	6
1	(Romania) Năstase	6	6	7

Fourth round
(New Zealand) Parun	4	2	6
1	(Romania) Năstase	6	6	7

Preceded by 1974 Australian Open – Men's singles	Grand Slam men's singles	Succeeded by 1974 Wimbledon Championships – Men's singles
