= 1975 Dutch Open (tennis) =

- Date: 20–27 July
- Edition: 18th
- Category: Grand Prix (B)
- Draw: 32S / 16D
- Prize money: $50,000
- Surface: Clay / outdoor
- Location: Hilversum, Netherlands
- Venue: 't Melkhuisje

Champions

Singles
- (Argentina) Guillermo Vilas

Doubles
- (Poland) Wojciech Fibak / (Argentina) Guillermo Vilas
- Dutch Open

The 1975 Dutch Open was a men's tennis tournament staged at 't Melkhuisje in Hilversum, Netherlands which was part of the Group B tier of the 1975 Grand Prix. The tournament was played on outdoor clay courts and was held from 20 July to 27 July 1975. It was the 18th edition of the tournament, and first-seeded Guillermo Vilas won his second consecutive singles title at the event.

== Finals ==
=== Singles ===
(Argentina) Guillermo Vilas defeated (Socialist Federal Republic of Yugoslavia) Željko Franulović 6–4, 6–7, 6–2, 6–3

- It was Vilas' 2nd singles title of the year and the 10th of his career.

=== Doubles ===
(Poland) Wojciech Fibak / (Argentina) Guillermo Vilas defeated (Socialist Federal Republic of Yugoslavia) Željko Franulović / (United Kingdom) John Lloyd 6–4, 6–3
