= Régis Brunet =

French tennis player

- Country (sports): France
- Born: 31 May 1956 (age 68); Marseille, France
- Height: 6 ft 0 in (183 cm)

Singles
- Career record: 2–7
- Highest ranking: No. 205 (12 July 1978)

Grand Slam singles results
- French Open: 1R (1976, 1979)

Doubles
- Career record: 1–8

Grand Slam doubles results
- French Open: 2R (1976)

Grand Slam mixed doubles results
- French Open: 1R (1976)

Régis Brunet (born 31 May 1956) is a French former professional tennis player.

Born in Marseille, Brunet had a best singles ranking of 205 in the world while competing on the professional tour in the 1970s and 1980s. He twice featured in the singles main draw of the French Open and lost in the first round both times, including in 1976 when he had a two-set lead over West German qualifier Frank Gebert.

Brunet has gone on to have a career in sports marketing and had a long association with IMG, acting early on as an agent for French players such as Guy Forget, Arnaud Boetsch and Thierry Tulasne. He has served as the tournament director of the Open Gaz de France and from 2004 to 2016 was Managing Director of IMG France.
