= Enrique Caviglia =

Argentine tennis player

- Country (sports): Argentina
- Born: 21 October 1956 (age 68)
- Plays: Right-handed

Singles
- Career record: 1–8
- Highest ranking: No. 190 (14 June 1976)

Grand Slam singles results
- French Open: 2R (1976)
- Wimbledon: Q1 (1976)

Doubles
- Career record: 1–8

Grand Slam doubles results
- French Open: 1R (1976, 1977, 1978)

Enrique Caviglia (born 21 October 1956) is an Argentine former professional tennis player.

A Davis Cup representative for Argentina, Caviglia made his only appearance in a 1976 Davis Cup tie against Brazil in Buenos Aires. He came in for the fifth rubber and beat Luis-Carlos Enck to secure a 5–0 sweep.

Caviglia qualified for the main draw of the 1976 French Open and won his first round match over George Hardie, then lost in the second round to countryman Ricardo Cano in five sets.

== See also ==
- List of Argentina Davis Cup team representatives
