= Luis Baraldi =

Mexican tennis player

- Full name: Luis Fernando Baraldi Briseño
- Country (sports): Mexico
- Born: 21 October 1951 (age 74) Mexico City, Mexico

Singles
- Career record: 0–9
- Highest ranking: No. 323 (17 Jan 1975)

Grand Slam singles results
- French Open: Q2 (1974)
- Wimbledon: Q1 (1973, 1974, 1976)

Doubles
- Career record: 3–5

Grand Slam doubles results
- French Open: 2R (1974)
- Wimbledon: 2R (1973)

Luis Fernando Baraldi Briseño (born 21 October 1951) is a Mexican former professional tennis player.

Born in Mexico City, Baraldi won Mexico's junior championship in 1969 and played collegiate tennis for Lamar University from 1970 to 1973. He was a member of Lamar University's 1973 Southland Conference championship side.

Following his collegiate tennis career he competed on the professional tour, making doubles main draw appearances at the French Open and Wimbledon Championships. He was ranked as high as number two nationally and had a best word ranking of 323. Between 1973 and 1976 he played seven Davis Cup rubbers for Mexico and won five national doubles championships over the course of his career.

Baraldi, who married tennis player Alina Balbiers, is the CEO of sports and entertainment company Baral Group, Inc.

== See also ==
- List of Mexico Davis Cup team representatives
