= Ben Bishop (tennis) =

American tennis player

- Full name: Ben Bishop Sr.
- Country (sports): United States
- Height: 5 ft 11 in (180 cm)

Singles
- Career record: 0–8
- Highest ranking: No. 281 (Mar 5, 1975)

Grand Slam singles results
- French Open: Q4 (1974)
- Wimbledon: Q2 (1975)

Ben Bishop Sr. is an American former professional tennis player.

Bishop is the son of an Air Force serviceman and as a result lived in several locations during his childhood, which included three years of high school in Wiesbaden, West Germany.

A 1966 graduate of Duxbury High School in Massachusetts, Bishop played collegiate tennis for the University of Miami, then competed on the professional tour in the 1970s. His career included qualifying draw appearances at the French Open and Wimbledon Championships.

Bishop is the grandfather of NHL goaltender Ben Bishop III.
