= Alex Pakozdi =

Chilean tennis player

- Full name: Alejandro Pakozdi
- Country (sports): Chile

Singles

Grand Slam singles results
- French Open: Q2 (1974)

Doubles

Grand Slam doubles results
- French Open: 1R (1974)

Alejandro Pakozdi is a Chilean former professional tennis player.

Pakozdi, a native of Santiago, has a brother Mario who also played tennis and became President of the Chilean Tennis Federation. Their father, Hungarian-born footballer László Pákozdi, was manager of the Chile national football team in 1957. During the 1970s, Pakozdi played collegiate tennis in the United States for University of Tulsa and then Doane University. He participated at the 1974 French Open and was later a tennis pro in Puerto Rico.
