= Álvaro Betancur =

Colombian tennis player

- Country (sports): Colombia
- Born: 3 January 1950 (age 75) Medellín, Colombia
- Plays: Right-handed

Singles
- Career record: 35–79
- Highest ranking: No. 68 (11 October 1976)

Grand Slam singles results
- French Open: 2R (1976)
- Wimbledon: 1R (1977)
- US Open: 2R (1975, 1978)

Doubles
- Career record: 11–70

Grand Slam doubles results
- French Open: 2R (1976)
- Wimbledon: 1R (1977)
- US Open: 1R (1975, 1976)

Álvaro Betancur (born 3 January 1950) is a Colombian former professional tennis player.

Based in Florida, Betancur comes from Medellín originally and featured in seven Davis Cup ties for Colombia during the 1970s. He played in Colombia's Inter-Zonal Final against eventual tournament winners South Africa in 1974 and won a dead rubber singles over Byron Bertram. His Davis Cup career also included a 1979 tie against the United States in Cleveland, where he lost singles matches to John McEnroe and Dick Stockton.

While competing on the professional tour he reached a best singles ranking of 68 in the world. He twice made the second round of the US Open, with wins over Billy Martin and Nick Saviano, in 1975 and 1978 respectively. His best performance on the Grand Prix circuit was a semi-final appearance at the 1980 South Orange Open.

Betancur continues to live in Florida and is the director of coaching at Saddlebrook Preparatory School.
