= Tomás Lynch (tennis) =

Argentine tennis player

- Full name: Tomás Miguel Lynch
- Country (sports): Argentina
- Born: 24 December 1947 (age 77)
- Plays: Right-handed

Singles
- Career record: 1–2 (Davis Cup)

Tomás Miguel Lynch (born 24 December 1947) is a former Argentine professional tennis player. He is a long-serving board member of the Argentine Tennis Association and is currently the vice president.

Lynch was a member of the Argentina Davis Cup team during the 1970s, participating in two ties for his country. He debuted in 1971 against Chile, playing two singles rubbers. He returned in 1975 for a tie with Uruguay, where he achieved his only win against Uruguay's Hugo Roverano.

== See also ==
- List of Argentina Davis Cup team representatives
