= Omar Laimina =

Moroccan tennis player

- Country (sports): Morocco
- Born: 1952 (age 72–73); Casablanca, Morocco

Singles
- Career record: 2–5
- Highest ranking: No. 166 (3 Jan 1979)

Grand Slam singles results
- French Open: 1R (1974)

Doubles
- Career record: 0–5

Grand Slam doubles results
- French Open: 1R (1974, 1976, 1979)

Grand Slam mixed doubles results
- French Open: SF (1977)

Omar Laimina (born 1952) is a Moroccan former professional tennis player.

Born and raised in Casablanca, Laimina won 20 rubbers for Morocco during his Davis Cup career, which spanned 1972 to 1983. He also served as non playing captain of the team in the early 1990s.

Laimina, who recorded a best singles ranking of 166, featured in multiple editions of the French Open. He qualified for the singles main draw at Roland Garros in 1974 and was a mixed doubles semi-finalist with Dominique Beillan in 1977.

== See also ==
- List of Morocco Davis Cup team representatives
