= Gavorielle Marcu =

Romanian tennis player

Gavorielle-Traian Marcu
- Country (sports): Romania
- Plays: Left-handed

Singles
- Career record: 3–13
- Career titles: 0
- Highest ranking: No. 204 (30 Apr 1975)

Grand Slam singles results
- French Open: 1R (1974)

Doubles
- Career record: 3–6
- Career titles: 0

Gavorielle Marcu is a left-handed Romanian former tennis player. His highest ATP ranking was number 204 achieved on 30 April 1975. He competed in the 1974 French Open, where he lost to John Yuill in the first round.
