= Hervé Gauvain =

French tennis player (1955–2025)

- Country (sports): France
- Born: 4 March 1955; Chalon-sur-Saône, France
- Died: 14 May 2025 (aged 70)
- Height: 180 cm (5 ft 11 in)

Singles
- Career record: 9–25
- Highest ranking: No. 148 (14 June 1976)

Grand Slam singles results
- Australian Open: 1R (1975)
- French Open: 1R (1974, 1976, 1977, 1978, 1979, 1980)

Doubles
- Career record: 4–20
- Highest ranking: No. 175 (12 Dec 1976)

Grand Slam doubles results
- French Open: 1R (1974, 1976, 1977, 1980, 1981)

Hervé Gauvain (4 March 1955 – 14 May 2025) was a French professional tennis player.

== Biography ==
A right-handed player from Chalon-sur-Saône, Gauvain featured on the professional tour in the 1970s and early 1980s. His best performance was a semi-final appearance at Nuremberg in 1976 and he also reached the quarter-finals at Helsinki in 1977. He played in the main draw of the French Open on six occasions, without making it past the first round.

His wife Florence was a professional tennis player. Their daughter, Sybille, played college tennis for San Jose State University and now competes professionally.

Gauvain died on 14 May 2025, at the age of 70.
