= Attila Korpás =

Hungarian-German tennis player

- Country (sports): Hungary; West Germany
- Born: 1 September 1945 (age 80) Budapest, Hungary

Singles
- Career record: 23–37
- Highest ranking: No. 87 (23 August 1973)

Grand Slam singles results
- French Open: 3R (1974)

Attila Korpás (born 1 September 1945) is a Hungarian-German former professional tennis player.

Born in Budapest, Korpás represented Hungary in a Davis Cup tie against Brazil in 1965.

By the 1970s he was playing under the West German flag and had a noted win over Jimmy Connors at Nice in 1972. In 1973 he was a quarter-finalist at both the Berlin and Dutch Opens. He featured in the main draw of the French Open on three occasions, most successfully in 1974 when he made the third round.

== See also ==
- List of Hungary Davis Cup team representatives
