= 1976 Dutch Open (tennis) =

- Date: 13–19 July
- Edition: 19th
- Category: Grand Prix (One star)
- Draw: 32S / 16D
- Prize money: $75,000
- Surface: Clay / outdoor
- Location: Hilversum, Netherlands
- Venue: 't Melkhuisje

Champions

Singles
- (Hungary) Balázs Taróczy

Doubles
- (Argentina) Ricardo Cano / (Chile) Belus Prajoux
- Dutch Open

The 1976 Dutch Open was a men's tennis tournament staged in Hilversum, Netherlands that was part of the one star category of the 1976 Grand Prix. The tournament was played on outdoor clay courts and was held from 13 July until 19 July 1976. It was the 19th edition of the tournament. Second-seeded Balázs Taróczy won the singles title.

== Finals ==
=== Singles ===
(Hungary) Balázs Taróczy defeated (Argentina) Ricardo Cano 6–7, 2–6, 6–1, 6–3, 6–4

- It was Taróczy's first singles title of the year and the second of his career.

=== Doubles ===
(Argentina) Ricardo Cano / (Chile) Belus Prajoux defeated (Poland) Wojciech Fibak / (Hungary) Balázs Taróczy 6–4, 6–3
