= Jean Lovera =

French tennis player and architect

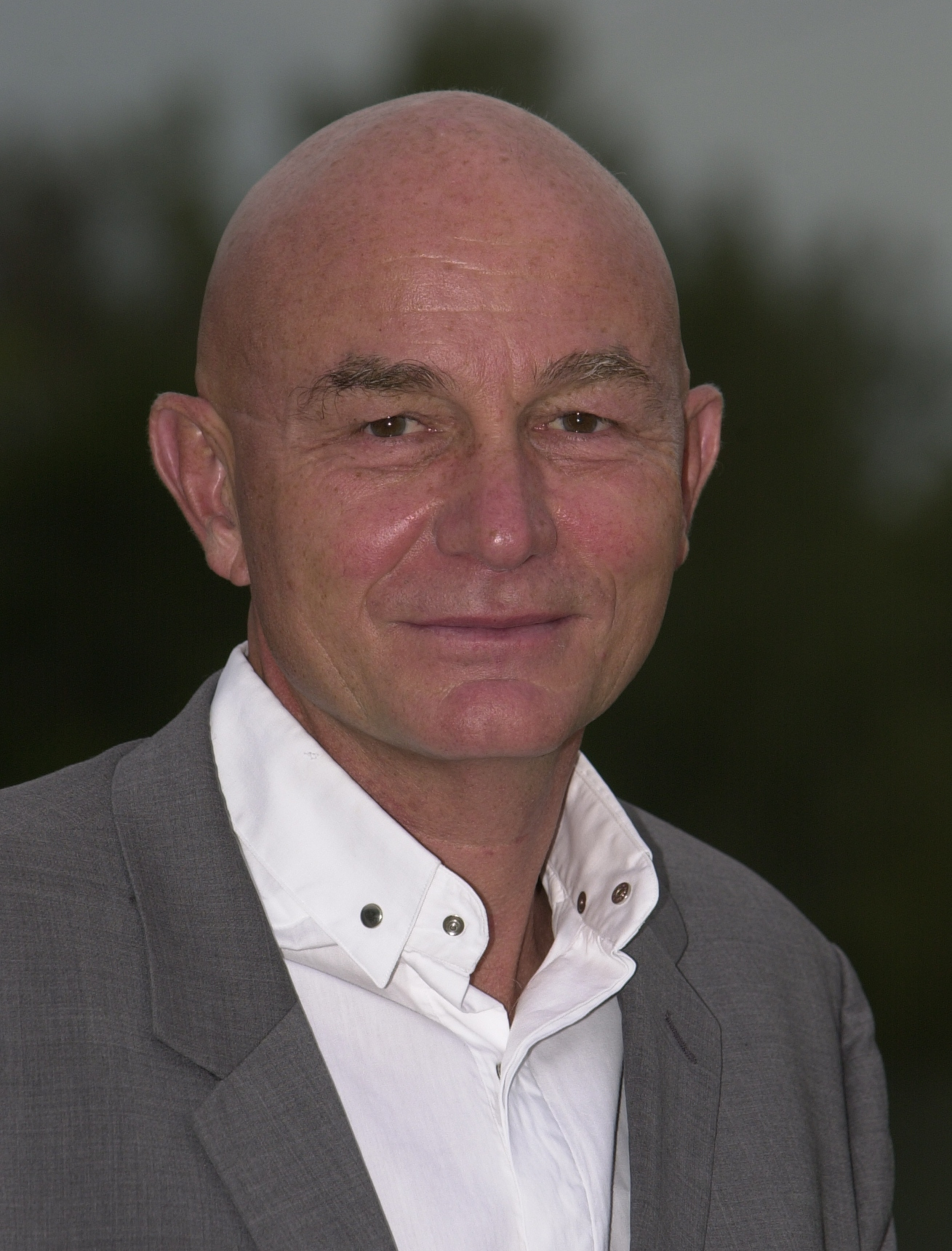
- Country (sports): France
- Born: 17 April 1951 (age 75) Grenoble, France
- Plays: Right-handed

Grand Slam singles results
- French Open: 2R (1974)

Grand Slam doubles results
- French Open: 2R (1974, 1976)

Jean Lovera (born 17 April 1951) is a French former tennis player. He competed in the Grand Slam singles events twice, both in the French Open. His best result came in 1974 when he defeated Donald Dell to advance to the second round, where he was beaten by John Yuill.

== Career ==
Lovera designed the Court One stadium at Roland Garros. Together with his friend Daniel Lelong he introduced in 1980 the concept of inviting contemporary artist to design a poster for each edition of the French Open.

He is currently a member of the committee of the International Tennis Hall of Fame.

== Personal life ==
Lovera's son, Victor Lovera, is an Olympic cross-country skier. He was married to tennis player Gail Sherriff.
