= Patrice Hagelauer =

French tennis player and coach

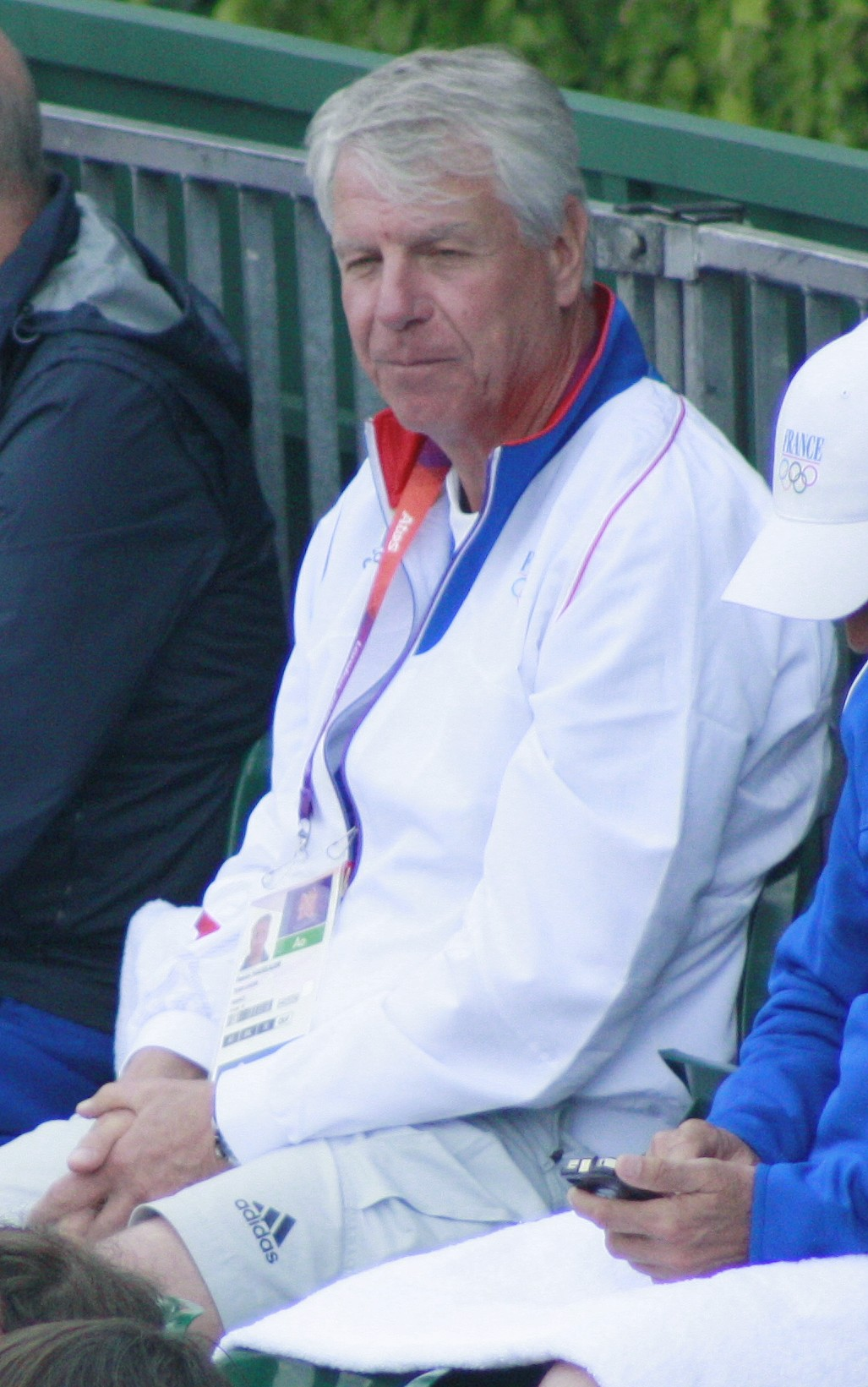
- Country (sports): France
- Born: 5 January 1948 (age 77); Marrakesh, Morocco
- Height: 188 cm (6 ft 2 in)

Singles
- Career record: 3–9

Grand Slam singles results
- Australian Open: 3R (1976)
- French Open: 1R (1974, 1976)
- Wimbledon: Q3 (1976)

Doubles
- Career record: 7–10

Grand Slam doubles results
- Australian Open: 1R (1976)
- French Open: 2R (1974, 1976)
- Wimbledon: Q1 (1977)

Patrice Hagelauer (born 5 January 1948) is a French tennis coach and former professional player. He competed on the professional tennis circuit in the 1970s, before going into coaching.

== Biography ==
Born and raised in French Morocco, Hagelauer moved with his parents to mainland France around the age of 16.

Hagelauer featured in the main draws of the Australian Open and French Open during his career, as well as in Wimbledon qualifiers. His best performance came at the 1976 Australian Open, where he upset sixth seed Geoff Masters, en route to the third round.

=== Coaching ===
As a coach he spent many years heading the France Davis Cup team and formed a successful association with Yannick Noah. Under the coaching of Hagelauer, Noah became the first Frenchman in 37 years to win at Roland Garros when he claimed the 1983 French Open title. Hagelauer's tenure as Davis Cup coach included the drought breaking tournament win in 1991, which was the country's first triumph since 1932. This team was captained by Noah.

From 1999 to 2002 he was the performance director of Britain's Lawn Tennis Association.

== Grand Prix career finals ==
=== Doubles: 1 (0–1) ===
Outcome	Year	Tournament	Surface	Partner	Opponents	Score
Runner-up	1977	Zürich, Switzerland	Hard	(France) Christophe Roger-Vasselin	(West Germany) Reinhart Probst (Socialist Federal Republic of Yugoslavia) Nikola Pilić	3–6, 1–6
