= Tito Vázquez =

Argentine tennis player and coach (born 1949)

- Full name: Modesto Vázquez
- Country (sports): Argentina
- Born: 1 January 1949 (age 77) Galicia, Spain
- Plays: Right-handed

Singles
- Career record: No. 85 (5 March 1975)
- Career titles: 0

Grand Slam singles results
- French Open: 2R (1973, 1974)
- Wimbledon: 1R (1972, 1975)
- US Open: 4R (1970)

Doubles
- Career titles: 2

Grand Slam doubles results
- French Open: QF (1974)
- Wimbledon: 1R (1974, 1975, 1977)
- US Open: 1R (1971, 1975)

Modesto "Tito" Vázquez (born 1 January 1949) is a tennis coach and former professional player from Argentina.

== Biography ==
Vázquez, born in Galicia region of Spain, emigrated to Buenos Aires with his family at a young age. They were one of many Spanish families to move to Argentina after the Civil War. He had his third birthday while on the ship to South America.

=== Playing career ===
A successful junior in Argentina, he went to UCLA and played NCAA tennis from 1967 to 1971 on a team that featured Jimmy Connors. He played for Argentina during the 1968 Davis Cup for a tie against Venezuela in Caracas and in the 1970 Davis Cup when he played Chile in Buenos Aires. These were his only two appearances in the tournament. He made it to the fourth round of the 1970 US Open and en route defeated Pancho Segura, who was making his final singles appearance in a Grand Slam. At the 1974 French Open, Vázquez partnered Guillermo Vilas in the men's doubles and the pair reached the quarter-finals. It was with Vilas that he won his first title on the Grand Prix circuit, the doubles at Hilversum in 1974. His only other title came in Buenos Aires with Carlos Kirmayr in 1976. He reached another Grand Slam quarterfinal at the 1977 French Open with Raquel Giscafré in the mixed doubles.

=== Coaching ===
As a coach, he led Víctor Pecci to the final of the 1979 French Open. During his coaching career, he was the captain of the Davis Cup teams for Argentina, Paraguay, and Venezuela. He first captained Argentina in the late 1980s and again from 2009 to 2011. Under Vázquez, Argentina finished second in the World Group in 2011.

== Grand Prix career finals ==
=== Doubles: 4 (2–2) ===
Result	W/L	Date	Tournament	Surface	Partner	Opponents	Score
Loss	0–1	Mar 1973	Jackson, United States	Hard	(Chile) Jaime Pinto-Bravo	(United States) Zan Guerry (South Africa) Frew McMillan	2–6, 4–6
Loss	0–2	Jul 1973	Kitzbühel, Austria	Clay	(Brazil) José Edison Mandarino	(United States) Jim McManus (Mexico) Raúl Ramírez	2–6, 2–6, 3–6
Win	1–2	Jul 1974	Hilversum, Netherlands	Clay	(Argentina) Guillermo Vilas	(Argentina) Lito Álvarez (Argentina) Julián Ganzábal	6–2, 3–6, 6–1, 6–2
Win	2–2	Nov 1976	Buenos Aires, Argentina	Clay	(Brazil) Carlos Kirmayr	(Argentina) Ricardo Cano (Chile) Belus Prajoux	6–4, 7–5

== See also ==
- List of Argentina Davis Cup team representatives
