= Julián Ganzábal =

Argentine tennis player

- Full name: Julián Ganzábal
- Country (sports): Argentina
- Born: 25 August 1946 (age 80) Buenos Aires, Argentina
- Plays: Right-handed

Singles
- Career record: 51–71
- Career titles: 4
- Highest ranking: No. 68 (6 July 1976)

Grand Slam singles results
- Australian Open: 2R (1966)
- French Open: 3R (1976)
- Wimbledon: 2R (1974, 1975)
- US Open: 1R (1976)

Doubles
- Career record: 28–51
- Career titles: 0

Grand Slam doubles results
- Australian Open: 1R (1966)
- French Open: 2R (1974)
- Wimbledon: 1R (1975, 1976)
- US Open: 1R (1976)

Julián Ganzábal (born 25 August 1946) is a former professional tennis player from Argentina.

== Biography ==
Ganzábal first played Davis Cup tennis for Argentina in 1967. His career singles highlights include winning the River Plate Championships four times (1968–69, 1973, 1976).

He defeated two-time Grand Slam winner Fred Stolle at Gstaad in 1969, but didn't go deep into a Grand Prix tournament until 1972 when he reached the semifinals at home in Buenos Aires. Further semifinals came at Florence in 1974 and Berlin in 1976. As a doubles player he partnered with Davis Cup teammate Lito Álvarez to finish runner-up at Hilversum in 1974. They were beaten in the final by the Argentine pair of Tito Vázquez and Guillermo Vilas.

At his best on clay, Ganzábal reached the third round of the 1976 French Open, his best performance in a Grand Slam tournament. Soon after the French Open, he reached his highest career ranking of 68 in the world.

Ganzábal ended his Davis Cup career in 1975 after 13 ties for his country. He finished with a 16–9 record overall, which included 14 singles wins.

Following retirement, he trained his younger brother Alejandro Ganzábal, who was also a professional tennis player. The brothers became major investors in Argentina's real estate industry.

== Grand Prix career finals ==
=== Doubles: 1 (0–1) ===
Result	W/L	Date	Tournament	Surface	Partner	Opponents	Score
Loss	0–1	Jul 1974	Hilversum, Netherlands	Clay	(Argentina) Lito Álvarez	(Argentina) Tito Vázquez (Argentina) Guillermo Vilas	2–6, 6–3, 1–6, 2–6

== See also ==
- List of Argentina Davis Cup team representatives
