= Lito Álvarez =

Argentine tennis player

- Country (sports): Argentina
- Residence: Santa Monica, California
- Born: 5 December 1947 (age 78) Buenos Aires, Argentina
- Plays: Right-handed

Singles
- Career record: 47–115
- Career titles: 0
- Highest ranking: No. 104 (15 Dec 1975)

Grand Slam singles results
- French Open: 2R (1975, 1976, 1978)
- Wimbledon: 2R (1977)
- US Open: 2R (1975)

Doubles
- Career record: 87–121
- Career titles: 1

Grand Slam doubles results
- French Open: 2R (1976, 1978)
- Wimbledon: 3R (1973, 1978)
- US Open: 2R (1979)

Elio "Lito" Álvarez (born 5 December 1947) is a former professional tennis player from Argentina.

== Career ==
Álvarez played collegiate tennis for the UCLA Bruins, on the same team as Jimmy Connors, in the early 1970s.

He appeared in eight Davis Cup ties for Argentina from 1970 to 1978. He played mainly in doubles rubbers but had two wins in the singles, against Carlos Kirmayr and Luis Felipe Tavares, both of Brazil. His doubles record was 4/4 and his partners included Guillermo Vilas and José Luis Clerc.

Álvarez made the second round of the singles draw at a Grand Slam tournament five times, from 14 attempts, but was unable to progress any further.

As well as being runner-up at the Dutch Open in 1977, Álvarez made six Grand Prix/WCT doubles finals, for one win, at São Paulo in 1976.

== Grand Prix/WCT career finals ==
=== Singles: 1 (0–1) ===
Result	W/L	Date	Tournament	Surface	Opponent	Score
Loss	0–1	Jul 1977	Hilversum, Netherlands	Clay	(France) Patrick Proisy	0–6, 2–6, 0–6

=== Doubles: 6 (1–5) ===
Result	W/L	Date	Tournament	Surface	Partner	Opponents	Score
Loss	0–1	Jun 1974	Dublin, Ireland		(Venezuela) Jorge Andrew	(Rhodesia) Colin Dowdeswell (South Africa) John Yuill	3–6, 2–6
Loss	0–2	Jul 1974	Hilversum, Netherlands	Clay	(Argentina) Julián Ganzábal	(Argentina) Tito Vázquez (Argentina) Guillermo Vilas	2–6, 6–3, 1–6, 2–6
Win	1–2	Nov 1976	São Paulo, Brazil	Carpet	(Paraguay) Víctor Pecci	(Argentina) Ricardo Cano (Chile) Belus Prajoux	6–4, 3–6, 6–3
Loss	1–3	Dec 1976	Santiago, Chile	Clay	(Chile) Belus Prajoux	(Chile) Patricio Cornejo (Chile) Hans Gildemeister	3–6, 6–7
Loss	1–4	Apr 1977	Buenos Aires, Argentina	Clay	(Argentina) Guillermo Vilas	(Poland) Wojciech Fibak (Romania) Ion Țiriac	5–7, 6–0, 6–7
Loss	1–5	Mar 1978	Cairo, Egypt	Clay	(United States) George Hardie	(Egypt) Ismail El Shafei (New Zealand) Brian Fairlie	3–6, 5–7, 2–6
