= 1975 Australian Open – Women's doubles =

Women's doubles
- 1975 Australian Open

Final
- Champions: (Australia) Evonne Goolagong (United States) Peggy Michel
- Runners-up: (Australia) Margaret Court (Soviet Union) Olga Morozova
- Score: 7–6, 7–6

Details
- Draw: 21
- Seeds: 8

Events
Singles	men	women		boys	girls
Doubles	men	women	mixed	boys	girls
WC Singles	men	women	quad
WC Doubles	men	women	quad
Legends	men	women	mixed
- Australian Open

Evonne Goolagong and Peggy Michel were the defending champions. They succeeded in extending their titles.

== Seeds ==
1. (Australia) Margaret Court / (Soviet Union) Olga Morozova (final)
2. (Australia) Evonne Goolagong / (United States) Peggy Michel (champions)
3. (Australia) Helen Gourlay / (Australia) Kerry Harris (semifinals)
4. (Australia) Lesley Bowrey / (Australia) Judy Dalton (semifinals)
5. (Australia) Jenny Dimond / (Australia) Dianne Fromholtz (quarterfinals)
6. (United Kingdom) Lesley Charles / (United Kingdom) Sue Mappin (quarterfinals)
7. (United Kingdom) Sue Barker / (United Kingdom) Glynis Coles (quarterfinals)
8. (United States) Laura duPont / (Australia) Wendy Turnbull (quarterfinals)

== Draw ==
Key

- Q = Qualifier
- WC = Wild card
- LL = Lucky loser
- Alt = Alternate
- ITF = ITF entry
- PR = Protected ranking
- SR = Special ranking
- SE = Special exempt
- JE = Junior exempt
- JR = Junior Accelerator Programme entrant
- CO = College Accelerator Programme entrant
- NG = Next Gen Accelerator Program entrant
- w/o = Walkover
- r = Retired
- d = Defaulted

=== Finals ===
Semifinals
1	(Australia) Margaret Court (Soviet Union) Olga Morozova	6	6
4	(Australia) Lesley Bowrey (Australia) Judy Dalton	1	2
3	(Australia) Helen Gourlay (Australia) Kerry Harris	4	1
2	(Australia) Evonne Goolagong (United States) Peggy Michel	6	6

Final
1	(Australia) Margaret Court (Soviet Union) Olga Morozova	6	6
2	(Australia) Evonne Goolagong (United States) Peggy Michel	7	7

=== Top half ===
First round
(Soviet Union) N Chmyreva (Portugal) D Fiuza	6	6
(Australia) S Irvine (Australia) G Williams	3	3
(Australia) K Ruddell (Australia) P Whytcross	6	6
(Australia) K Hogarth (Czechoslovakia) M Navratilova	3	4

Second round
1	(Australia) M Court (Soviet Union) O Morozova	6	6
(Soviet Union) N Chmyreva (Portugal) D Fiuza	0	0
(Australia) K Ruddell (Australia) P Whytcross	5	1
8	(United States) L duPont (Australia) W Turnbull	7	6
5	(Australia) J Dimond (Australia) D Fromholtz	6	3	6
(Australia) V Lancaster (Australia) C Matison	4	6	4
(Australia) D Evers (Australia) N Gregory	5	1
4	(Australia) L Bowrey (Australia) J Dalton	7	6

Quarterfinals
1	(Australia) M Court (Soviet Union) O Morozova	6	6
8	(United States) L duPont (Australia) W Turnbull	1	3
5	(Australia) J Dimond (Australia) D Fromholtz	5	3
4	(Australia) L Bowrey (Australia) J Dalton	7	6

Semifinals
1	(Australia) M Court (Soviet Union) O Morozova	6	6
4	(Australia) L Bowrey (Australia) J Dalton	1	2

=== Bottom half ===
First round
(Australia) L Raymond (Australia) G Stirton	4	4
(Belgium) M Gurdal (France) F Thibault	6	6
(Australia) C Cerato (Japan) K Nomura	3	3
(Australia) K Hallam (Australia) J Wilton	6	6
(United States) S Greer (United States) C Martínez	4	3
(Australia) C O'Neil (New Zealand) C Walker	6	6

Second round
3	(Australia) H Gourlay (Australia) K Harris	6	6
(Belgium) M Gurdal (France) F Thibault	1	2
(Australia) C Doerner (Australia) J Walker	4	1
6	(United Kingdom) L Charles (United Kingdom) S Mappin	6	6
7	(United Kingdom) S Barker (United Kingdom) G Coles	6	2	6
(Australia) K Hallam (Australia) J Wilton	1	6	2
(Australia) C O'Neil (New Zealand) C Walker	3	4
2	(Australia) E Goolagong (United States) P Michel	6	6

Quarterfinals
3	(Australia) H Gourlay (Australia) K Harris	6	6
6	(United Kingdom) L Charles (United Kingdom) S Mappin	3	4
7	(United Kingdom) S Barker (United Kingdom) G Coles	6	3	6
2	(Australia) E Goolagong (United States) P Michel	4	6	8

Semifinals
3	(Australia) H Gourlay (Australia) K Harris	4	1
2	(Australia) E Goolagong (United States) P Michel	6	6
