= 1976 Australian Open – Women's singles =

Women's singles
- 1976 Australian Open

Final
- Champion: (Australia) Evonne Goolagong
- Runner-up: (Czechoslovakia) Renáta Tomanová
- Score: 6–2, 6–2

Details
- Draw: 32
- Seeds: 8

Events
Singles	men	women		boys	girls
Doubles	men	women	mixed	boys	girls
WC Singles	men	women	quad
WC Doubles	men	women	quad
Legends	men	women	mixed
- Australian Open

Two-time defending champion Evonne Goolagong defeated Renáta Tomanová in the final, 6–2, 6–2 to win the women's singles tennis title at the 1976 Australian Open. It was her third Australian Open singles title (and sixth consecutive final) and fifth major singles title overall. For the second consecutive year, Goolagong did not lose a set during the tournament.

== Seeds ==
The seeded players are listed below. Evonne Goolagong is the champion; others show the round in which they were eliminated.

1. (Australia) Evonne Goolagong (champion)
2. (Australia) Kerry Reid (first round)
3. (West Germany) Helga Masthoff (quarterfinals)
4. (United Kingdom) Sue Barker (second round)
5. (Czechoslovakia) Renáta Tomanová (finalist)
6. (Australia) Helen Gourlay (semifinals)
7. (Australia) Lesley Bowrey (quarterfinals)
8. (Australia) Janet Young (second round)

== Draw ==
=== Key ===
- Q = Qualifier
- WC = Wild card
- LL = Lucky loser
- r = Retired

=== Finals ===
Quarterfinals
1	(Australia) Evonne Goolagong	6	7
7	(Australia) Lesley Bowrey	1	6
6	(Australia) Helen Gourlay	6	6	6
(West Germany) Heidi Eisterlehner	3	7	2
3	(West Germany) Helga Masthoff	6	5	1
5	(Czechoslovakia) Renáta Tomanová	4	7	6
(Australia) Christine Matison	6	3	1
(Sweden) Elisabeth Ekblom	4	6	6

Semifinals
1	(Australia) Evonne Goolagong	6	6
6	(Australia) Helen Gourlay	3	3
5	(Czechoslovakia) Renáta Tomanová	6	6
(Sweden) Elisabeth Ekblom	3	2

Finals
1	(Australia) Evonne Goolagong	6	6
5	(Czechoslovakia) Renáta Tomanová	2	2

=== Earlier rounds ===
==== Section 1 ====
First round
1	(Australia) E Goolagong	6	6
(Sweden) L Stenberg	3	0
(France) B Simon	6	6
(Australia) K Neill	1	4
(Belgium) M Gurdal	6	6
(Australia) N Gregory	3	3
(Australia) K Ruddell	3	1
7	(Australia) L Bowrey	6	6
6	(Australia) H Gourlay	6	6
(Sweden) N Bohm	3	1
(Australia) W Turnbull	6	6
(Australia) P Whytcross	3	4
(West Germany) H Eisterlehner	7	6
(Australia) K Hallam	6	3
(Australia) D Evers	4	5
4	(United Kingdom) S Barker	6	7

Second round
1	(Australia) E Goolagong	6	6
(France) B Simon	2	1
(Belgium) M Gurdal	3	4
7	(Australia) L Bowrey	6	6
6	(Australia) H Gourlay	6	6
(Australia) W Turnbull	1	1
(West Germany) H Eisterlehner	6	7
4	(United Kingdom) S Barker	3	6

Quarterfinals
1	(Australia) E Goolagong	6	7
7	(Australia) L Bowrey	1	6
6	(Australia) H Gourlay	6	6	6
(West Germany) H Eisterlehner	3	7	2

Semifinals
1	(Australia) E Goolagong	6	6
6	(Australia) H Gourlay	3	3

==== Section 2 ====
First round
3	(West Germany) H Masthoff	6	6
(Australia) J Dalton	3	2
(United Kingdom) M Tyler	6	6
(Australia) J Dimond	2	2
(Australia) J Hanrahan	6	2	7
(Australia) C Griffiths	4	6	5
(Australia) C Zeeman	0	2
5	(Czechoslovakia) R Tomanová	6	6
8	(Australia) J Young	2	6	6
(Australia) J Walker	6	3	0
(Australia) C Matison	6	6
(Australia) J Wilton	0	2
(United States) K Harter	6	7
(Australia) C O'Neil	2	6
(Sweden) E Ekblom	6	6
2	(Australia) K Reid	4	3

Second round
3	(West Germany) H Masthoff	7	7
(United Kingdom) M Tyler	5	6
(Australia) J Hanrahan	3	3
5	(Czechoslovakia) R Tomanová	6	6
8	(Australia) J Young	6	2	3
(Australia) C Matison	2	6	6
(United States) K Harter	6	1	2
(Sweden) E Ekblom	3	6	6

Quarterfinals
3	(West Germany) H Masthoff	4	7	6
5	(Czechoslovakia) R Tomanová	6	5	1
(Australia) C Matison	4	6	6
(Sweden) E Ekblom	6	3	1

Semifinals
5	(Czechoslovakia) R Tomanová	6	6
(Sweden) E Ekblom	3	2

Preceded by 1975 US Open – Women's singles	Grand Slam women's singles	Succeeded by 1976 French Open – Women's singles
