= 1975 Australian Open – Women's singles =

Women's singles
- 1975 Australian Open

Final
- Champion: (Australia) Evonne Goolagong
- Runner-up: (Czechoslovakia) Martina Navratilova
- Score: 6–3, 6–2

Details
- Draw: 56
- Seeds: 8

Events
Singles	men	women		boys	girls
Doubles	men	women	mixed	boys	girls
WC Singles	men	women	quad
WC Doubles	men	women	quad
Legends	men	women	mixed
- Australian Open

Defending champion Evonne Goolagong defeated Martina Navratilova in the final, 6–3, 6–2 to win the women's singles tennis title at the 1975 Australian Open. It was her fourth major singles title. Goolagong did not lose a set during the tournament.

== Seeds ==
1. (Australia) Margaret Court (quarterfinals)
2. (Soviet Union) Olga Morozova (quarterfinals)
3. (Australia) Evonne Goolagong (champion)
4. (Australia) Kerry Melville (second round)
5. (Australia) Helen Gourlay (second round)
6. (Japan) Kazuko Sawamatsu (quarterfinals)
7. (Australia) Dianne Fromholtz (third round)
8. (Czechoslovakia) Martina Navratilova (final)

== Draw ==
=== Key ===
- Q = Qualifier
- WC = Wild card
- LL = Lucky loser
- r = Retired

=== Finals ===
Quarterfinals
1	(Australia) Margaret Court	4	3
8	(Czechoslovakia) Martina Navratilova	6	6
(Australia) Christine Matison	6	2	5
(Soviet Union) Natasha Chmyreva	3	6	7
3	(Australia) Evonne Goolagong	6	7
6	(Japan) Kazuko Sawamatsu	3	5
(United Kingdom) Sue Barker	6	7
2	(Soviet Union) Olga Morozova	2	6

Semifinals
8	(Czechoslovakia) Martina Navratilova	6	6
(Soviet Union) Natasha Chmyreva	4	4
3	(Australia) Evonne Goolagong	6	6
(United Kingdom) Sue Barker	2	4

Finals
8	(Czechoslovakia) Martina Navratilova	3	2
3	(Australia) Evonne Goolagong	6	6

=== Earlier rounds ===
==== Section 1 ====
First round
(United Kingdom) S Mappin	6	7
(Australia) C Cerato	4	5
(Australia) C Doerner	6	6
(Portugal) D Fiuza	0	1
(Australia) W Turnbull	2	6	6
(Australia) L Bowrey	6	4	1
(Australia) P Whytcross	6
(United Kingdom) G Coles	2
(Australia) N Gregory	7	6
(Australia) D Evers	5	0
(Belgium) M Van Haver	7	6
(Sweden) V Andersson	5	2

Second round
1	(Australia) M Court	6	7
(United Kingdom) S Mappin	2	5
(Australia) C Doerner	7	4	1
(Australia) W Turnbull	5	6	6
(Australia) P Whytcross	2	6	4
(Australia) N Gregory	6	4	6
(Belgium) M Van Haver	3	6
8	(Czechoslovakia) M Navratilova	6	7

Third round
1	(Australia) M Court	6	6
(Australia) W Turnbull	4	1
(Australia) N Gregory	0	3
8	(Czechoslovakia) M Navratilova	6	6

Quarterfinals
1	(Australia) M Court	4	3
8	(Czechoslovakia) M Navratilova	6	6

==== Section 2 ====
First round
(United States) P Michel	6	6
(Australia) G Stirton	4	4
(Australia) C Matison	6	6
(Japan) E Iida	4	1
(Sweden) H Anliot	2	6	6
(Australia) J Walker	6	1	2
(Soviet Union) N Chmyreva	6	6
(United Kingdom) B Thompson	2	1
(United States) L duPont	4	7	11
(Australia) K Harris	6	6	9
(United States) S Greer	7	6
(Australia) K Hallam	5	1

Second round
5	(Australia) H Gourlay	2	2
(United States) P Michel	6	6
(Australia) C Matison	6	6
(Sweden) H Anliot	4	3
(Soviet Union) N Chmyreva	6	6
(United States) L duPont	3	0
(United States) S Greer
4	(Australia) K Melville	w/o

Third round
(United States) P Michel	6	6	5
(Australia) C Matison	7	2	7
(Soviet Union) N Chmyreva	7	6
(United States) S Greer	5	1

Quarterfinals
(Australia) C Matison	3	6	7
(Soviet Union) N Chmyreva	6	2	5

==== Section 3 ====
First round
(Australia) C O'Neil	6	6
(Australia) L Raymond	4	3
(United Kingdom) L Mottram	6	6
(Australia) J Staines	3	2
(Japan) K Nomura	7	3	6
(Australia) S Irvine	6	6	3
(United Kingdom) L Charles	6	6
(Australia) M Pratt	1	0
(Belgium) M Gurdal	7	6
(New Zealand) C Walker	6	2
(United States) M Schallau	6	6
(Australia) C Draper	2	1

Second round
3	(Australia) E Goolagong	6	6
(Australia) C O'Neil	1	1
(United Kingdom) L Mottram	7	6
(Japan) K Nomura	5	3
(United Kingdom) L Charles	0	6	6
(Belgium) M Gurdal	6	4	2
(United States) M Schallau	2	0
6	(Japan) K Sawamatsu	6	6

Third round
3	(Australia) E Goolagong	6	6
(United Kingdom) L Mottram	3	2
(United Kingdom) L Charles	4	4
6	(Japan) K Sawamatsu	6	6

Quarterfinals
3	(Australia) E Goolagong	6	7
6	(Japan) K Sawamatsu	3	5

==== Section 4 ====
First round
(Australia) J Wilton	6	6
(Australia) K Neill	3	1
(Australia) V Lancaster	6	5	7
(Australia) K Ruddell	0	7	5
(United Kingdom) S Barker	6	6
(Australia) G Williams	0	1
(Australia) M Robinson	6	6
(Australia) K Hogarth	4	3
(United States) C Martinez	6	6
(Australia) J Hanrahan	3	0
(France) F Thibault	6	6
(Australia) J Dimond	1	2

Second round
7	(Australia) D Fromholtz	6	6	6
(Australia) J Wilton	7	2	1
(Australia) V Lancaster	4	6	0
(United Kingdom) S Barker	6	2	6
(Australia) M Robinson	2	4
(United States) C Martinez	6	6
(France) F Thibault	2	0
2	(Soviet Union) O Morozova	6	6

Third round
7	(Australia) D Fromholtz	5	3
(United Kingdom) S Barker	7	6
(United States) C Martinez	1	2
2	(Soviet Union) O Morozova	6	6

Quarterfinals
(United Kingdom) S Barker	6	7
2	(Soviet Union) O Morozova	2	6

Preceded by 1974 US Open – Women's singles	Grand Slam women's singles	Succeeded by 1975 French Open – Women's singles
