= 1972 Wimbledon Championships – Boys' singles =

Boys' singles
- 1972 Wimbledon Championships

Final
- Champion: (Sweden) Björn Borg
- Runner-up: (United Kingdom) Buster Mottram
- Score: 6–3, 4–6, 7–5

Events
Singles	men	women		boys	girls
Doubles	men	women	mixed	boys	girls
- Wimbledon Championships

Björn Borg defeated Buster Mottram in the final, 6–3, 4–6, 7–5 to win the boys' singles tennis title at the 1972 Wimbledon Championships.

Borg was just 16 years, 33 days old when he won the Wimbledon Boys’ crown, and in 1976, at 20 years, 27 days old, he would become the first man in the Open Era to win the Boys’ and Gentlemen’s crown at Wimbledon.

== Draw ==
Key

- Q = Qualifier
- WC = Wild card
- LL = Lucky loser
- Alt = Alternate
- ITF = ITF entry
- PR = Protected ranking
- SR = Special ranking
- SE = Special exempt
- JE = Junior exempt
- JR = Junior Accelerator Programme entrant
- CO = College Accelerator Programme entrant
- NG = Next Gen Accelerator Program entrant
- w/o = Walkover
- r = Retired
- d = Defaulted

=== Finals ===
Semifinals
(United Kingdom) Buster Mottram	6	9
(United States) Vitas Gerulaitis	4	8
(Italy) Carlo Borea	4	4
(Sweden) Björn Borg	6	6

Final
(United Kingdom) Buster Mottram	3	6	5
(Sweden) Björn Borg	6	4	7

=== Top half ===
First round
(Monaco) Bernard Balleret	0	0
(United Kingdom) Buster Mottram	6	6
(Spain) Salvador Cabeza	6	4	6
(Poland) R Szczepanik	3	6	2
(Denmark) N Rathlev	2	6	2
(India) N Bhanumurthy	6	4	6
(United States) Vitas Gerulaitis	6	6
(Lebanon) Z Zaydan	0	0
(Republic of Ireland) D Heavey	5	3
(Finland) T Peltonen	7	6
(West Germany) Ulrich Pinner	6	3	6
(Australia) Paul Kronk	2	6	4
(Canada) Kosti Killas	6	6
(Portugal) C Almeida	2	2

Second round
(Norway) O Faye	1	0
(United Kingdom) C Mottram	6	6
(Spain) S Cabeza	6	6	6
(India) N Bhanumurthy	1	8	2
(United States) V Gerulaitis	6	6
(Finland) T Peltonen	1	0
(West Germany) U Pinner	6	6
(Canada) K Killas	2	4

Quarterfinals
(United Kingdom) C Mottram	8	6
(Spain) S Cabeza	6	2
(United States) V Gerulaitis	6	6
(West Germany) U Pinner	2	3

Semifinals
(United Kingdom) C Mottram	6	9
(United States) V Gerulaitis	4	8

=== Bottom half ===
First round
(Belgium) J Grandjean	9	6	2
(Soviet Union) Aleksandr Bogomolov	7	8	6
(France) Hervé Gauvain	2	6	6
(Netherlands) Wouter Fok	6	4	8
(Pakistan) IA Majid	2	2
(Italy) Carlo Borea	6	6
(Israel) Yair Wertheimer	6	6
(Austria) P Riegler	2	3
(Socialist Federal Republic of Yugoslavia) B Tončić	0	2
(Sweden) Björn Borg	6	6
(Sudan) AF Toubia	0	1
(New Zealand) Russell Simpson	6	6

Second round
(Soviet Union) A Bogomolov	6	3	6
(Netherlands) W Fok	4	6	3
(Italy) C Borea	7	6
(Israel) Y Wertheimer	5	1
(Sweden) B Borg	6	6
(New Zealand) R Simpson	4	4
(Chile) Belus Prajoux	6	6
(Switzerland) R Kronig	1	0

Quarterfinals
(Soviet Union) A Bogomolov	2	6
(Italy) C Borea	6	8
(Sweden) B Borg	6	5	6
(Chile) C Prajoux	4	7	4

Semifinals
(Italy) C Borea	4	4
(Sweden) B Borg	6	6
