= 1975 Wimbledon Championships – Men's singles qualifying =

Men's singles qualifying
- 1975 Wimbledon Championships

Events
Singles	men	women		boys	girls
Doubles	men	women	mixed	boys	girls
WC Singles	men	women	quad
WC Doubles	men	women	quad
Legends	men	women	seniors

Qualification
Singles	men	women
Doubles	men	women	mixed
- Wimbledon Championships

Players who neither had high enough rankings nor received wild cards to enter the main draw of the annual Wimbledon Tennis Championships participated in a qualifying tournament held one week before the event. Several players withdrew from the main draw after qualifying had commenced, leading to the highest ranked players who lost in the final qualifying round to be entered into the main draw as lucky losers.

== Qualifiers ==
1. (Australia) Mark Edmondson
2. (South Africa) Bernard Mitton
3. (India) Chiradip Mukerjea
4. (United Kingdom) Martin Robinson
5. (Venezuela) Humphrey Hose
6. (Venezuela) Jorge Andrew
7. (Brazil) Carlos Kirmayr
8. (United Kingdom) Graham Stilwell
9. (United Kingdom) John Paish
10. (Paraguay) Víctor Pecci
11. (United Kingdom) Gerald Battrick
12. (South Africa) Anthony Fawcett
13. (New Zealand) Russell Simpson
14. (United States) John Holladay
15. (United States) Woody Blocher
16. (Argentina) Lito Álvarez

== Lucky losers ==
1. (Sweden) Tenny Svensson
2. (Australia) John James
3. (Argentina) Tito Vázquez

== Qualifying draw ==
Key

- Q = Qualifier
- WC = Wild card
- LL = Lucky loser
- Alt = Alternate
- ITF = ITF entry
- PR = Protected ranking
- SR = Special ranking
- SE = Special exempt
- JE = Junior exempt
- JR = Junior Accelerator Programme entrant
- CO = College Accelerator Programme entrant
- NG = Next Gen Accelerator Program entrant
- w/o = Walkover
- r = Retired
- d = Defaulted

=== First qualifier ===
First round
1	(Australia) Mark Edmondson	6	6
8	(Jamaica) Richard Russell	4	2
4	(India) Sashi Menon	9	6
5	(United States) Norman Holmes	8	3
2	(Soviet Union) Konstantin Pugaev	9	1
7	(Australia) Wayne Cowley	8	0^{r}
3	(Sweden) Jan Zabrodsky	6	8
6	(Australia) Bob Rheinberger	3	6

Second round
(Australia) Mark Edmondson	6	2	6
(India) Sashi Menon	3	6	3
(Soviet Union) Konstantin Pugaev	8	6	6
(Sweden) Jan Zabrodsky	9	2	3

Qualifying competition
(Australia) Mark Edmondson	6	6	8
(Soviet Union) Konstantin Pugaev	2	4	6

=== Second qualifier ===
First round
1	(South Africa) Bernard Mitton	6	6
8	(Pakistan) Meer Mohammed Khan	0	4
4	(United States) Ben Bishop	6	6
5	(Japan) Toshiro Sakai	1	3
2	(Czechoslovakia) Vladimír Zedník	6	6
7	(United States) Guillermo Oropez	4	4
3	(United States) Robyn Ray	6	4	6
6	(Egypt) Aly El Dawoudi	0	6	2

Second round
(South Africa) Bernard Mitton	6	6
(United States) Ben Bishop	2	0
(Czechoslovakia) Vladimír Zedník	1	9	6
(United States) Robyn Ray	6	8	2

Qualifying competition
(South Africa) Bernard Mitton	6	6	9
(Czechoslovakia) Vladimír Zedník	1	2	7

=== Third qualifier ===
First round
1	(India) Chiradip Mukerjea	9	6
8	(United Kingdom) Rohun Beven	8	4
4	(Australia) Graeme Thomson	6	6
5	(South Africa) Steve Fine	2	3
2	(Australia) John Trickey	6	6
7	(France) Jean-Louis Haillet	1	4
3	(Australia) Trevor Little	9	6
6	(Switzerland) Petr Kanderal	7	3

Second round
(India) Chiradip Mukerjea	3	7	6
(Australia) Graeme Thomson	6	5	1
(Australia) John Trickey	7	4	6
(Australia) Trevor Little	5	6	1

Qualifying competition
(India) Chiradip Mukerjea	6	2	4	7	6
(Australia) John Trickey	2	6	6	5	4

=== Fourth qualifier ===
First round
1	(United Kingdom) Martin Robinson	6	6
8	(Australia) Geoff Pollard	2	4
4	(Switzerland) Matthias Werren	4	6	6
5	(United States) Steve Messmer	6	4	1
2	(Argentina) Tito Vázquez	6	6
7	(Australia) P. M. M. McCarthy	4	0
3	(Finland) Matti Timonen	6	6
6	(United States) Ak Elkins	3	4

Second round
(United Kingdom) Martin Robinson	8	7	7
(Switzerland) Matthias Werren	9	5	5
(Argentina) Tito Vázquez	6	9
(Finland) Matti Timonen	4	7

Qualifying competition
(United Kingdom) Martin Robinson	3	6	9	6
(Argentina) Tito Vázquez	6	1	8	1

=== Fifth qualifier ===
First round
1	(Venezuela) Humphrey Hose	6	3	6
8	(Australia) Greg Braun	2	6	3
4	(Australia) Noel Jensen	7	7
5	(Australia) Simon Clarke	5	5
2	(Brazil) Fernando Gentil	6	6
7	(France) Jacques Thamin	4	1
3	(United Kingdom) Tony Lloyd	6	6
6	(India) Jayakumar Royappa	4	2

Second round
(Venezuela) Humphrey Hose	6	6
(Australia) Noel Jensen	1	4
(Brazil) Fernando Gentil	6	6
(United Kingdom) Tony Lloyd	4	3

Qualifying competition
(Venezuela) Humphrey Hose	6	9	6
(Brazil) Fernando Gentil	2	8	4

=== Sixth qualifier ===
First round
1	(Venezuela) Jorge Andrew	6	6
8	(United Kingdom) Martin Smith	4	4
4	(United States) Pancho Walthall	6	3	8
5	(Pakistan) Saeed Meer	3	6	6
2	(Australia) John James	6	6
7	(India) Ashok Amritraj	2	4
3	(New Zealand) Anthony Parun	6	5	6
6	(Australia) Noel Callaghan	1	7	2

Second round
(Venezuela) Jorge Andrew	6	4	6
(United States) Pancho Walthall	4	6	3
(Australia) John James	9	6
(New Zealand) Anthony Parun	8	4

Qualifying competition
(Venezuela) Jorge Andrew	6	6	6
(Australia) John James	4	3	4

=== Seventh qualifier ===
First round
1	(Brazil) Carlos Kirmayr	6	6
8	(New Zealand) John Mills	1	2
4	(United Kingdom) Mike Collins	4	6	6
5	(Ecuador) Eduardo Zuleta	6	3	2
2	(Australia) Peter Campbell	6	6
7	(Israel) Ruben Porges	2	3
3	(United States) Chico Hagey	6	8	9
6	(South Africa) Willem Prinsloo	4	9	7

Second round
(Brazil) Carlos Kirmayr	6	9
(United Kingdom) Mike Collins	3	8
(Australia) Peter Campbell	6	5	7
(United States) Chico Hagey	4	7	5

Qualifying competition
(Brazil) Carlos Kirmayr	6	8	9	9
(Australia) Peter Campbell	1	9	7	8

=== Eighth qualifier ===
First round
1	(United Kingdom) Graham Stilwell	6	6
8	(Australia) Brad Drewett	0	4
4	(Australia) Ernie Ewert	3	7	6
5	(France) Thierry Bernasconi	6	5	3
2	(New Zealand) Chris Lewis	6	6
7	(United States) Dean Martin	2	2
3	(Japan) Kenichi Hirai	5	6	6
6	(United Kingdom) Phil Siviter	7	4	1

Second round
(United Kingdom) Graham Stilwell	6	6
(Australia) Ernie Ewert	1	4
(New Zealand) Chris Lewis	6	6
(Japan) Kenichi Hirai	4	0

Qualifying competition
(United Kingdom) Graham Stilwell	3	2	6	6	7
(New Zealand) Chris Lewis	6	6	1	4	5

=== Ninth qualifier ===
First round
1	(United Kingdom) John Paish	6	6
8	(Australia) Warren Maher	2	2
4	(Japan) Yuji Tezuka	6	7
5	(Australia) William Durham	3	5
2	(Australia) Dale Collings	6	8	6
7	(South Africa) Pat Cramer	3	9	3
3	(Bolivia) Ramiro Benavides	9	6
6	(Australia) Eugene McCabe	7	2

Second round
(United Kingdom) John Paish	9	6
(Japan) Yuji Tezuka	7	4
(Australia) Dale Collings	5	6	6
(Bolivia) Ramiro Benavides	7	1	4

Qualifying competition
(United Kingdom) John Paish	6	6	3	4	6
(Australia) Dale Collings	3	1	6	6	3

=== Tenth qualifier ===
First round
1	(Paraguay) Víctor Pecci	6	6
8	(United States) Spencer Segura	3	3
4	(Canada) Tony Bardsley	6	6	6
5	(West Germany) Rolf Gehring	8	2	2
2	(France) Jean-Baptiste Chanfreau	6	4	6
7	(United Kingdom) Jasper Cooper	3	6	3
3	(South Africa) Graham Silberman	1	6	6
6	(Sweden) Douglas Palm	6	4	2

Second round
(Paraguay) Víctor Pecci	6	6
(Canada) Tony Bardsley	4	3
(France) Jean-Baptiste Chanfreau	6	6
(South Africa) Graham Silberman	3	4

Qualifying competition
(Paraguay) Víctor Pecci	8	6	6
(France) Jean-Baptiste Chanfreau	6	1	2

=== Eleventh qualifier ===
First round
1	(United Kingdom) Gerald Battrick	6	6
8	(South Africa) Deon Joubert	2	2
4	(Czechoslovakia) Pavel Složil	6	6
5	(Spain) Salvador Cabeza	2	4
2	(Czechoslovakia) Tomáš Šmíd	9	6
7	(Australia) Cliff Letcher	8	4
3	(France) Patrice Hagelauer	3	6	6
6	(South Africa) Rauty Krog	6	4	3

Second round
(United Kingdom) Gerald Battrick	6	1	6
(Czechoslovakia) Pavel Složil	2	6	4
(Czechoslovakia) Tomáš Šmíd	6	6
(France) Patrice Hagelauer	3	3

Qualifying competition
(United Kingdom) Gerald Battrick	6	7	6
(Czechoslovakia) Tomáš Šmíd	2	5	1

=== Twelfth qualifier ===
First round
1	(South Africa) Anthony Fawcett	5	6	6
8	(United States) Mike Prineas	7	4	2
4	(United States) Larry Turville	6	4	6
5	(Japan) Nobuya Tamura	1	6	3
2	(United Kingdom) Jonathan Smith	7	6
7	(Canada) Greg Halder	5	1
3	(India) Premjit Lall	6	6
6	(South Africa) Bob Hewitt	4	1

Second round
(South Africa) Anthony Fawcett	6	9
(United States) Larry Turville	3	7
(United Kingdom) Jonathan Smith	9
(India) Premjit Lall	8^{r}

Qualifying competition
(South Africa) Anthony Fawcett	9	1	6	6
(United Kingdom) Jonathan Smith	8	6	3	4

=== Thirteenth qualifier ===
First round
1	(New Zealand) Russell Simpson	6	6
8	(Poland) Jacek Niedźwiedzki	4	2
4	(Australia) Allan McDonald	6	6
5	(Soviet Union) Vadim Borisov	2	1
2	(Sweden) Tenny Svensson	6	6
7	(Australia) Terry Rocavert	4	3
3	(Australia) Peter Doerner	2	6	9
6	(South Africa) David Schneider	6	3	7

Second round
(New Zealand) Russell Simpson	6	6
(Australia) Allan McDonald	2	4
(Sweden) Tenny Svensson	7	6
(Australia) Peter Doerner	5	4

Qualifying competition
(New Zealand) Russell Simpson	4	6	6	8
(Sweden) Tenny Svensson	6	2	4	6

=== Fourteenth qualifier ===
First round
1	(United States) John Holladay	7	6
8	(Japan) Kiyoshi Tanabe	5	3
4	(New Zealand) Peter Langsford	6	1
5	(Spain) Juan Ignacio Muntañola	3	0^{r}
2	(Australia) Tony Dawson	9	6
7	(South Africa) Derek Schroder	8	4
3	(Australia) Chris Kachel	6	6
6	(United States) Armistead Neely	3	3

Second round
(United States) John Holladay	6	6
(New Zealand) Peter Langsford	3	2
(Australia) Tony Dawson	7	6
(Australia) Chris Kachel	5	3

Qualifying competition
(United States) John Holladay	9	6	6
(Australia) Tony Dawson	8	3	1

=== Fifteenth qualifier ===
First round
1	(United States) Woody Blocher	6	6
8	(Australia) Stephen Myers	3	4
4	(Czechoslovakia) František Pála	5	7	6
5	(Australia) Greg Perkins	7	5	3
2	(Australia) Steve Docherty	6	6
7	(Australia) Campbell Robertson	3	2
3	(Finland) Leo Palin	7	3	6
6	(United States) Jim McManus	5	6	4

Second round
(United States) Woody Blocher	5	7	6
(Czechoslovakia) František Pála	7	5	1
(Australia) Steve Docherty	9	6
(Finland) Leo Palin	7	4

Qualifying competition
(United States) Woody Blocher	3	5	6	6	6
(Australia) Steve Docherty	6	7	3	4	0

=== Sixteenth qualifier ===
First round
1	(Argentina) Lito Álvarez	6	6
8	(Japan) Sachio Kato	3	4
4	(Australia) Stephen Wright	3	9	6
5	(United States) John Fort	6	7	3
2	(United Kingdom) Christopher Wells	6	6
7	(South Africa) Derek Segal	4	2
3	(West Germany) Ulrich Marten	6	7
6	(Australia) Harry Brittain	4	5

Second round
(Argentina) Lito Álvarez	6	6
(Australia) Stephen Wright	2	0
(United Kingdom) Christopher Wells	6	9
(West Germany) Ulrich Marten	2	7

Qualifying competition
(Argentina) Lito Álvarez	6	6	6
(United Kingdom) Christopher Wells	2	3	4
