= 1975 New Zealand Open – Singles =

Singles
- 1975 New Zealand Open

Final
- Champion: (New Zealand) Onny Parun
- Runner-up: (New Zealand) Brian Fairlie
- Score: 4–6, 6–4, 6–4, 6–7, 6–4

Details
- Draw: 32
- Seeds: 4

Events
Singles	Doubles
← 1974 ·	ATP Auckland Open	· 1976 →

Björn Borg was the defending champion but did not compete that year.

Onny Parun won in the final 4–6, 6–4, 6–4, 6–7, 6–4 against Brian Fairlie.

== Seeds ==
Champion seeds are indicated in bold text while text in italics indicates the round in which those seeds were eliminated.

1. (New Zealand) **Onny Parun (champion)**
2. (New Zealand) Brian Fairlie (final)
3. (Australia) Ray Ruffels (quarterfinals)
4. (Australia) Syd Ball (quarterfinals)

== Draw ==
=== Key ===
- Q = Qualifier
- WC = Wild card
- LL = Lucky loser
- Alt = Alternate
- ITF = ITF entry
- PR = Protected ranking
- SR = Special ranking
- SE = Special exempt
- JE = Junior exempt
- JR = Junior Accelerator Programme entrant
- CO = College Accelerator Programme entrant
- NG = Next Gen Accelerator Program entrant
- w/o = Walkover
- r = Retired
- d = Defaulted

=== Final ===
Semifinals
1	(New Zealand) **Onny Parun**	**6**	**6**	**6**
(New Zealand) Jeff Simpson	3	3	3
2	(New Zealand) **Brian Fairlie**	**6**	0	**7**	**6**
(Australia) Dick Crealy	4	**6**	6	4

Final
1	(New Zealand) **Onny Parun**	4	**6**	**6**	6	**6**
2	(New Zealand) Brian Fairlie	**6**	4	4	**7**	4

=== Top half ===
First round
1	(New Zealand) **O Parun**	**6**	**6**	3	**6**
(Finland) J Narakka	1	3	**6**	1
(United States) **M Machette**	**6**	**6**	**7**
(Brazil) J Soares	3	4	6
(Austria) **G Wimmer**	**6**	**6**	**6**
(New Zealand) G Slater	2	4	3
(New Zealand) **G Oliver**	**6**	**6**	**6**
(United States) M Prineas	0	1	2
(New Zealand) **J Simpson**	**6**	**7**	**6**
(New Zealand) T Parun	3	6	3
(New Zealand) **R Simpson**	**6**	**6**	**6**
(Finland) L Palin	3	4	1
(Canada) G Halder	3	0	5
3	(Australia) **R Ruffels**	**6**	**6**	**7**

Second round
1	(New Zealand) **O Parun**	**6**	6	**6**	2	**17**
(United States) M Machette	4	**7**	4	**6**	15
(Austria) **G Wimmer**	**7**	**6**	**6**
(New Zealand) G Oliver	6	3	2
(New Zealand) **J Simpson**	**6**	**7**	**6**
(Australia) C Letcher	3	5	4
(New Zealand) R Simpson	**7**	3	5	6
3	(Australia) **R Ruffels**	6	**6**	**7**	**7**

Quarterfinals
1	(New Zealand) **O Parun**	**7**	6	**7**	**6**
(Austria) G Wimmer	6	**7**	6	4
(New Zealand) **J Simpson**	**7**	**7**	**6**
3	(Australia) R Ruffels	6	6	2

Semifinals
1	(New Zealand) **O Parun**	**6**	**6**	**6**
(New Zealand) J Simpson	3	3	3

=== Bottom half ===
First round
2	(New Zealand) **B Fairlie**	**6**	**6**	**6**
(United States) R Jones	4	4	3
(Mexico) **J Loyo-Mayo**	2	**7**	**6**	**6**
(New Zealand) C Lewis	**6**	6	0	2
(United States) **S Carnahan**	**6**	**6**	**6**
(United Kingdom) R Lewis	3	3	1
(Australia) **B Carmichael**	**6**	3	**6**	**6**
F Whitaker	2	**6**	3	4
(Australia) **D Crealy**	**6**	**6**	**6**
(Australia) P Langsford	4	1	1
(Australia) **S Docherty**	**7**	**7**	**7**
(Australia) W Cowley	6	5	6
(Finland) **M Timonen**	2	**7**	**6**	**6**
(United Kingdom) M Robinson	**6**	6	0	1
P Thompson	3	1	6
4	(Australia) **S Ball**	**6**	**6**	**7**

Second round
2	(New Zealand) **B Fairlie**	**6**	**6**	**6**
(Mexico) J Loyo-Mayo	3	0	0
(United States) **S Carnahan**	6	5
(Australia) B Carmichael	**7**	4^{r}
(Australia) **D Crealy**	**6**	**6**	**6**
(Australia) S Docherty	4	2	4
(Finland) M Timonen	**6**	4	1	**6**	5
4	(Australia) **S Ball**	4	**6**	**6**	4	**7**

Quarterfinals
2	(New Zealand) **B Fairlie**	**6**	**6**	**6**
(United States) S Carnahan	3	2	4
(Australia) **D Crealy**	4	**6**	**6**	**7**
4	(Australia) S Ball	**6**	3	3	5

Semifinals
2	(New Zealand) **B Fairlie**	**6**	0	**7**	**6**
(Australia) D Crealy	4	**6**	6	4
