= 1976 Australian Open – Women's doubles =

Women's doubles
- 1976 Australian Open

Final
- Champions: (Australia) Evonne Cawley (Australia) Helen Gourlay
- Runners-up: (Australia) Lesley Bowrey (Czechoslovakia) Renáta Tomanová
- Score: 8–1

Details
- Draw: 19
- Seeds: 4

Events
Singles	men	women		boys	girls
Doubles	men	women	mixed	boys	girls
WC Singles	men	women	quad
WC Doubles	men	women	quad
Legends	men	women	mixed
- Australian Open

Evonne Goolagong Cawley and Peggy Michel were the reigning champions. Michel did not defend her title. Goolagong Cawley partnered with Helen Gourlay – this pair won the tournament.

== Seeds ==
1. (Australia) Evonne Cawley / (Australia) Helen Gourlay (champions)
2. (Australia) Lesley Bowrey / (Czechoslovakia) Renáta Tomanová (final)
3. (United Kingdom) Sue Barker / (United Kingdom) Michelle Tyler (quarterfinals)
4. (West Germany) Heidi Eisterlehner / (West Germany) Helga Masthoff (second round)

== Draw ==
Key

- Q = Qualifier
- WC = Wild card
- LL = Lucky loser
- Alt = Alternate
- ITF = ITF entry
- PR = Protected ranking
- SR = Special ranking
- SE = Special exempt
- JE = Junior exempt
- JR = Junior Accelerator Programme entrant
- CO = College Accelerator Programme entrant
- NG = Next Gen Accelerator Program entrant
- w/o = Walkover
- r = Retired
- d = Defaulted

=== Finals ===
Semifinals
1	(Australia) Evonne Cawley (Australia) Helen Gourlay	6	6
(Australia) Diane Evers (Australia) Chris O'Neil	1	2
(United States) Kathleen Harter (Australia) Wendy Turnbull	3	6	5
2	(Australia) Lesley Bowrey (Czechoslovakia) Renáta Tomanová	6	4	7

Final
1	(Australia) Evonne Cawley (Australia) Helen Gourlay	8
2	(Australia) Lesley Bowrey (Czechoslovakia) Renáta Tomanová	1

=== Top half ===
First round
(Australia) C Griffiths (Australia) J Walker	5	3
(United States) R Blount (Australia) K Hallam	7	6

Second round
1	(Australia) E Cawley (Australia) H Gourlay	6	6
(Australia) N Gregory (Australia) J Hanrahan	0	3
(Belgium) M Gurdal (France) B Simon	6	6
(Australia) C Cerato (Australia) K Neill	3	0
4	(West Germany) H Eisterlehner (West Germany) H Masthoff	2	7	3
(Australia) D Evers (Australia) C O'Neil	6	5	6
(Australia) N Eastburn (Australia) G Williams	3	2
(United States) R Blount (Australia) K Hallam	6	6

Quarterfinals
1	(Australia) E Cawley (Australia) H Gourlay	6	6
(Belgium) M Gurdal (France) B Simon	1	1
(Australia) D Evers (Australia) C O'Neil	6	6
(United States) R Blount (Australia) K Hallam	3	4

Semifinals
1	(Australia) E Cawley (Australia) H Gourlay	6	6
(Australia) D Evers (Australia) C O'Neil	1	2

=== Bottom half ===
First round
(United States) K Harter (Australia) W Turnbull	w/o
(Australia) J Burrows (Australia) J Wilton
(Australia) C Matison (Australia) P Whytcross	6	6
(Australia) J Dimond (Australia) W Moore	3	1

Second round
(United States) K Harter (Australia) W Turnbull	w/o
(Australia) C Matison (Australia) P Whytcross
(Australia) J Dalton (Australia) K Ruddell	7	2	5
3	(United Kingdom) S Barker (United Kingdom) M Tyler	6	6	7
(Australia) L Raymond (Australia) G Stirton	3	0
(Australia) M Smith (Australia) C Zeeman	6	6
(Australia) D Berkinshaw (Japan) E Murata
2	(Australia) L Bowrey (Czechoslovakia) R Tomanová	w/o

Quarterfinals
(United States) K Harter (Australia) W Turnbull	6	4	6
3	(United Kingdom) S Barker (United Kingdom) M Tyler	4	6	3
(Australia) M Smith (Australia) C Zeeman	6	0	1
2	(Australia) L Bowrey (Czechoslovakia) R Tomanová	3	6	6

Semifinals
(United States) K Harter (Australia) W Turnbull	3	6	5
2	(Australia) L Bowrey (Czechoslovakia) R Tomanová	6	4	7
