= 1976 New Zealand Open – Singles =

Singles
- 1976 New Zealand Open

Final
- Champion: (New Zealand) Onny Parun
- Runner-up: (New Zealand) Brian Fairlie
- Score: 6–2, 6–3, 4–6, 6–3

Details
- Draw: 32

Events
Singles	Doubles
← 1975 ·	ATP Auckland Open	· 1977 →

Onny Parun was the defending champion and won in the final 6–2, 6–3, 4–6, 6–3 against Brian Fairlie.

== Draw ==
=== Key ===
- Q = Qualifier
- WC = Wild card
- LL = Lucky loser
- Alt = Alternate
- ITF = ITF entry
- PR = Protected ranking
- SR = Special ranking
- SE = Special exempt
- JE = Junior exempt
- JR = Junior Accelerator Programme entrant
- CO = College Accelerator Programme entrant
- NG = Next Gen Accelerator Program entrant
- w/o = Walkover
- r = Retired
- d = Defaulted

NB: The Quarterfinals, Semifinals and Final were the best of 5 sets while the First and Second Round were the best of 3 sets.

=== Final ===
Final
(New Zealand) Onny Parun	6	6	4	6
(New Zealand) Brian Fairlie	2	3	6	3

=== Section 1 ===
First round
(New Zealand) O Parun	7	7
(France) D Bedel	6	5
(Australia) P Langsford	6	4	1
(West Germany) H Elschenbroich	4	6	6
(Australia) C Dibley	6	7
(Australia) W Cowley	2	6
(New Zealand) J Simpson	6	7
(Canada) K Carpenter	3	6
(United Kingdom) J Lloyd	6	2	6
(New Zealand) T Parun	3	6	3
(Australia) D Crealy	7	6
(France) P Hagelauer	6	3
(New Zealand) C Lewis	4	4
(West Germany) W Zirngibl	6	6
A Whittaker	2	2
(South Africa) R Moore	6	6

Second round
(New Zealand) O Parun	7	7
(West Germany) H Elschenbroich	6	6
(Australia) C Dibley	6	6
(New Zealand) J Simpson	2	1
(United Kingdom) J Lloyd	2	6
(Australia) D Crealy	6	7
(West Germany) W Zirngibl	4	2
(South Africa) R Moore	6	6

Quarterfinals
(New Zealand) O Parun	1	7	7	6
(Australia) C Dibley	6	6	6	3
(Australia) D Crealy	2	6	3
(South Africa) R Moore	6	7	6

Semifinals
(New Zealand) O Parun	6	7	4	7
(South Africa) R Moore	3	5	6	6

=== Section 2 ===
First round
(New Zealand) B Fairlie	6	6
(West Germany) U Marten	3	4
(New Zealand) R Hawkes	6	2	6
(Australia) C Letcher	3	6	3
(Australia) B Carmichael	6	6
(Austria) G Wimmer	3	4
(United Kingdom) R Lewis	7	6	12
(Brazil) J Soares	6	7	10
(Australia) B Giltinan	7	7
(South Africa) G Simmonds	5	6
(New Zealand) J Mills	4	6	6
(West Germany) R Gehring	6	4	3
(New Zealand) R Simpson	6	6
(United Kingdom) R Drysdale	1	2
(New Zealand) G Slater	5	2
(Australia) R Ruffels	7	6

Second round
(New Zealand) B Fairlie	6	6
(New Zealand) R Hawkes	1	0
(Australia) B Carmichael	6	6
(United Kingdom) R Lewis	2	4
(Australia) B Giltinan	6	6
(New Zealand) J Mills	4	3
(New Zealand) R Simpson	7	4	2
(Australia) R Ruffels	5	6	6

Quarterfinals
(New Zealand) B Fairlie	7	6	3	6
(Australia) B Carmichael	5	1	6	4
(Australia) B Giltinan	4	2	6	4
(Australia) R Ruffels	6	6	1	6

Semifinals
(New Zealand) B Fairlie	5	7	6	6
(Australia) R Ruffels	7	6	4	1
