= 1976 Australian Open – Men's doubles =

Men's doubles
- 1976 Australian Open

Final
- Champion: (Australia) John Newcombe (Australia) Tony Roche
- Runner-up: (Australia) Ross Case (Australia) Geoff Masters
- Score: 7–6, 6–4

Details
- Draw: 32
- Seeds: 8

Events
Singles	men	women		boys	girls
Doubles	men	women	mixed	boys	girls
WC Singles	men	women	quad
WC Doubles	men	women	quad
Legends	men	women	mixed
- Australian Open

John Alexander and Phil Dent were the defending champions.

== Seeds ==
1. (Australia) John Newcombe / (Australia) Tony Roche (champion)
2. (Australia) Ross Case / (Australia) Geoff Masters (final)
3. (Australia) Bob Carmichael / (Australia) Ken Rosewall (semifinals)
4. (United States) Charlie Pasarell / (United States) Stan Smith (semifinals)
5. (Australia) Ray Ruffels / (Australia) Allan Stone (first round)
6. (Australia) Dick Crealy / (Australia) Phil Dent (quarterfinals)
7. (Australia) Mal Anderson / (Australia) Colin Dibley (quarterfinals)
8. (Australia) Syd Ball / (Australia) Kim Warwick (quarterfinals)

== Draw ==
Key

- Q = Qualifier
- WC = Wild card
- LL = Lucky loser
- Alt = Alternate
- ITF = ITF entry
- PR = Protected ranking
- SR = Special ranking
- SE = Special exempt
- JE = Junior exempt
- JR = Junior Accelerator Programme entrant
- CO = College Accelerator Programme entrant
- NG = Next Gen Accelerator Program entrant
- w/o = Walkover
- r = Retired
- d = Defaulted

=== Finals ===
Semifinals
1	(Australia) John Newcombe (Australia) Tony Roche	4	7	6
4	(United States) Charlie Pasarell (United States) Stan Smith	6	6	2
3	(Australia) Bob Carmichael (Australia) Ken Rosewall	1	3
2	(Australia) Ross Case (Australia) Geoff Masters	6	6

Final
1	(Australia) John Newcombe (Australia) Tony Roche	7	6
2	(Australia) Ross Case (Australia) Geoff Masters	6	4

=== Top half ===
First round
1	(Australia) J Newcombe (Australia) T Roche	7	6
(Austria) P Feigl (Austria) G Wimmer	6	4
(New Zealand) C Lewis (New Zealand) R Simpson	4	2
(Australia) E Ewert (Australia) J James	6	6
(United Kingdom) J Lloyd (South Africa) R Moore	4	6	6
(Australia) P Campbell (Australia) M Senior	6	4	2
(Soviet Union) T Kakulia (United States) R Reid	4	6
8	(Australia) S Ball (Australia) K Warwick	6	7
5	(Australia) R Ruffels (Australia) A Stone	6	4
(West Germany) R Gehring (West Germany) U Marten	7	6
(Australia) N Fraser (Australia) R Hartwig	7	4	6
(United Kingdom) R Drysdale (United Kingdom) J Smith	5	6	8
(Australia) J Bartlett (Australia) B Giltinan	6	7
(Australia) M Edmondson (Australia) J Marks	4	6
(Australia) D Carter (United States) J Di Louie	2	6
4	(United States) C Pasarell (United States) S Smith	6	7

Second round
1	(Australia) J Newcombe (Australia) T Roche	7	6
(Australia) E Ewert (Australia) J James	6	4
(United Kingdom) J Lloyd (South Africa) R Moore	5	4
8	(Australia) S Ball (Australia) K Warwick	7	6
(West Germany) R Gehring (West Germany) U Marten	6	7	6
(United Kingdom) R Drysdale (United Kingdom) J Smith	7	5	3
(Australia) J Bartlett (Australia) B Giltinan	3	4
4	(United States) C Pasarell (United States) S Smith	6	6

Quarterfinals
1	(Australia) J Newcombe (Australia) T Roche	6	5	6
8	(Australia) S Ball (Australia) K Warwick	3	7	4
(West Germany) R Gehring (West Germany) U Marten	6	3
4	(United States) C Pasarell (United States) S Smith	7	6

Semifinals
1	(Australia) J Newcombe (Australia) T Roche	4	7	6
4	(United States) C Pasarell (United States) S Smith	6	6	2

=== Bottom half ===
First round
3	(Australia) B Carmichael (Australia) K Rosewall	7	6
(Australia) C Kachel (Australia) P McNamara	6	0
(West Germany) H Elschenbroich (New Zealand) B Fairlie	w/o
(Australia) S Clarke (Czechoslovakia) J Kukal
(Sweden) U Eriksson (Sweden) O Palmer	3	6
(Australia) W Durham (Australia) C Letcher	6	7
(France) P Hagelauer (France) X Lemoine	6	6	4
6	(Australia) D Crealy (Australia) P Dent	3	7	6
7	(Australia) M Anderson (Australia) C Dibley	7	6
(Australia) T Little (Australia) J Trickey	6	3
(Australia) P McNamee (Brazil) J Soares	6	3
(United Kingdom) R Lewis (West Germany) W Zirngibl	7	6
(Australia) W Coghlan (Australia) C Stubs	3	6	5
(Australia) A Gardiner (Australia) K Hancock	6	3	7
(Australia) J Eastburn (Australia) K Hiskins	6	4	1
2	(Australia) R Case (Australia) G Masters	4	6	6

Second round
3	(Australia) B Carmichael (Australia) K Rosewall	6	6
(West Germany) H Elschenbroich (New Zealand) B Fairlie	2	3
(Australia) W Durham (Australia) C Letcher	1	1
6	(Australia) D Crealy (Australia) P Dent	6	6
7	(Australia) M Anderson (Australia) C Dibley	6	7
(United Kingdom) R Lewis (West Germany) W Zirngibl	3	5
(Australia) A Gardiner (Australia) K Hancock	6	1
2	(Australia) R Case (Australia) G Masters	7	6

Quarterfinals
3	(Australia) B Carmichael (Australia) K Rosewall	6	3	6
6	(Australia) D Crealy (Australia) P Dent	3	6	2
7	(Australia) M Anderson (Australia) C Dibley	6	3
2	(Australia) R Case (Australia) G Masters	7	6

Semifinals
3	(Australia) B Carmichael (Australia) K Rosewall	1	3
2	(Australia) R Case (Australia) G Masters	6	6
