= Sally Greer =

American tennis player (born 1955)

- Country (sports): United States
- Born: March 25, 1955 (age 70) Havana, Cuba
- College: University of Miami

Singles

Grand Slam singles results
- Australian Open: 3R (1975)
- French Open: 1R (1974, 1976)
- Wimbledon: 2R (1975)
- US Open: 2R (1973)

Doubles

Grand Slam doubles results
- Australian Open: 1R (1975)
- Wimbledon: 2R (1974, 1976)
- US Open: 1R (1973, 1974, 1976)

Sally Greer (born 25 March 1955) is an American former professional tennis player.

== Biography ==
Greer, the daughter of Cuban-American parents, grew up in Miami, Florida. She played college tennis for the University of Miami in 1972-1973, then played on the professional tour for five years. She played in the main draw of all four grand slam tournaments, and her best performance was a third-round appearance at the 1975 Australian Open.

Retiring from tennis at the age of 23, Greer began a career in media as a sports anchor and reporter for an ABC network in Florida. She is a certified addiction counselor, having overcome an alcohol addiction of her own.

She has a younger brother, Pedro José Greer, who is a noted academic and physician.
