= Trevor Little =

Australian tennis player

- Country (sports): Australia

Singles
- Career record: 1–6
- Highest ranking: No. 254 (14 June 1976)

Grand Slam singles results
- Australian Open: 2R (1976)
- French Open: Q2 (1975)
- Wimbledon: Q2 (1975)

Doubles
- Career record: 2–7

Grand Slam doubles results
- Australian Open: 1R (1975, 1976, 1977)

Grand Slam mixed doubles results
- Wimbledon: 2R (1975, 1976)

Trevor Little is an Australian former professional tennis player.

Little was a junior doubles champion at the 1974 Australian Open (with David Carter). His best tournament success on tour came in 1975 when he won the Malaysian championships, beating former champion Gondo Widjojo in the final. He had a first round win over Peter McNamara (in five sets) at the 1976 Australian Open, before being eliminated by third-seed Tony Roche. Following his playing career he became a coach in Victoria.

Little is the uncle of tennis siblings John and Sally Peers, through his tennis playing sister Elizabeth.
