= 1976 Australian Open – Men's singles =

Men's singles
- 1976 Australian Open

Final
- Champion: (Australia) Mark Edmondson
- Runner-up: (Australia) John Newcombe
- Score: 6–7^{(5–7)}, 6–3, 7–6^{(8–6)}, 6–1

Details
- Draw: 64
- Seeds: 16

Events
Singles	men	women		boys	girls
Doubles	men	women	mixed	boys	girls
WC Singles	men	women	quad
WC Doubles	men	women	quad
Legends	men	women	mixed
- Australian Open

Mark Edmondson defeated defending champion John Newcombe in the final, 6–7^{(5–7)}, 6–3, 7–6^{(8–6)}, 6–1 to win the men's singles tennis title at the 1976 Australian Open. Unseeded at the tournament and ranked world No. 212 at the time, Edmondson remains the lowest ranked man to win a singles major since the ATP rankings were introduced in 1973. Edmondson is also the most recent Australian to win the Australian Open men's singles title.

== Seeds ==
The seeded players are listed below. Mark Edmondson is the champion; others show the round in which they were eliminated.

1. (Australia) Ken Rosewall (semifinals)
2. (Australia) John Newcombe (final)
3. (Australia) Tony Roche (quarterfinals)
4. (United States) Stan Smith (third round)
5. (Australia) Phil Dent (second round)
6. (Australia) Geoff Masters (second round)
7. (Australia) Ross Case (quarterfinals)
8. (Australia) Allan Stone (second round)
9. (Australia) Bob Carmichael (first round)
10. (United States) Charlie Pasarell (third round)
11. (Australia) Ray Ruffels (semifinals)
12. (New Zealand) Brian Fairlie (third round)
13. (Australia) Dick Crealy (quarterfinals)
14. (Australia) Kim Warwick (third round)
15. (South Africa) Ray Moore (third round)
16. (Australia) Syd Ball (third round)

== Draw ==
=== Final eight ===
Quarterfinals
1	(Australia) Ken Rosewall	6	3	6	6
(Australia) Brad Drewett	4	6	2	2
13	(Australia) Dick Crealy	5	6	2
(Australia) Mark Edmondson	7	7	6
11	(Australia) Ray Ruffels	7	2	6	7	6
3	(Australia) Tony Roche	6	6	7	6	4
7	(Australia) Ross Case	4	4	1
2	(Australia) John Newcombe	6	6	6

Semifinals
1	(Australia) Ken Rosewall	1	6	2	4
(Australia) Mark Edmondson	6	2	6	6
11	(Australia) Ray Ruffels	4	4	6
2	(Australia) John Newcombe	6	6	7

Final
(Australia) Mark Edmondson	6	6	7	6
2	(Australia) John Newcombe	7	3	6	1

=== Section 1 ===
First round
1	(Australia) K Rosewall	6	6	6
(Australia) G Braun	3	1	4
(United Kingdom) R Lewis	1	6	7	2
(Australia) J Trickey	6	7	5	1^{r}
16	(Australia) S Ball	6	7	6
(United States) GR Reid	2	6	2
(Australia) W Coghlan	3	2	6	6	6
(Australia) J Bartlett	6	6	3	2	4
8	(Australia) A Stone	7	6	7
(Australia) P McNamee	6	0	6
(Australia) B Drewett	6	6	6
(West Germany) H Elschenbroich	1	4	4
9	(Australia) B Carmichael	5	4	6	1
(United Kingdom) J Lloyd	7	6	4	6
(Australia) J Marks	6	4	3	4
(Australia) M Anderson	3	6	6	6

Second round
1	(Australia) K Rosewall	6	6	6
(United Kingdom) R Lewis	2	1	1
16	(Australia) S Ball	6	6	6	6
(Australia) W Coghlan	2	4	7	3
8	(Australia) A Stone	3	4	6	5
(Australia) B Drewett	6	6	4	7
(United Kingdom) J Lloyd	5	4	6	5
(Australia) M Anderson	7	6	4	7

Third round
1	(Australia) K Rosewall	6	7	6
16	(Australia) S Ball	3	6	0
(Australia) B Drewett	6	6	5	6
(Australia) M Anderson	4	3	7	3

Quarterfinals
1	(Australia) K Rosewall	6	3	6	6
(Australia) B Drewett	4	6	2	2

=== Section 2 ===
First round
4	(United States) S Smith	7	6	6
(Australia) C Letcher	6	2	2
(Australia) J James	6	6	6
(Australia) R Rheinberger	1	1	0
13	(Australia) D Crealy	6	7	7
(United Kingdom) J Smith	4	5	6
(Soviet Union) T Kakulia	6	6	4	6	6
(Italy) G Marchetti	4	0	6	7	1
5	(Australia) P Dent	6	6	6
(New Zealand) R Simpson	4	4	4
(Austria) P Feigl	6	4	7	4	1
(Australia) M Edmondson	1	6	6	6	6
12	(New Zealand) B Fairlie	4	6	6	6
(Australia) A Gardiner	6	4	1	1
(Australia) S Wright	4	2	3
(Australia) F Sedgman	6	6	6

Second round
4	(United States) S Smith	7	4	5	6	6
(Australia) J James	5	6	7	1	3
13	(Australia) D Crealy	7	6	6
(Soviet Union) T Kakulia	6	3	1
5	(Australia) P Dent	0	4	6	3
(Australia) M Edmondson	6	6	4	6
12	(New Zealand) B Fairlie	6	6	6
(Australia) F Sedgman	4	2	1

Third round
4	(United States) S Smith	6	5	1	4
13	(Australia) D Crealy	3	7	6	6
(Australia) M Edmondson	3	6	6	6
12	(New Zealand) B Fairlie	6	3	1	4

Quarterfinals
13	(Australia) D Crealy	5	6	2
(Australia) M Edmondson	7	7	6

=== Section 3 ===
First round
(United Kingdom) R Drysdale	2	6	4	4
(Australia) B Giltinan	6	3	6	6
(Italy) E Vattuone	1	4	5
11	(Australia) R Ruffels	6	6	7
(Australia) S Clarke	6	1	4	2
(France) P Hagelauer	4	6	6	6
(Australia) P Campbell	6	1	2
6	(Australia) G Masters	7	6	6
(Brazil) J Soares	6	1	2
(West Germany) U Marten	7	6	6
(Australia) C Kachel	3	6	3	4
14	(Australia) K Warwick	6	3	6	6
(Australia) P McNamara	1	1	4
(Australia) T Little	6	6	6
(West Germany) W Zirngibl	3	1	2
3	(Australia) T Roche	6	6	6

Second round
(Australia) B Giltinan	4	6	4
11	(Australia) R Ruffels	6	7	6
(France) P Hagelauer	6	6	4	5	7
6	(Australia) G Masters	4	1	6	7	6
(Germany) U Marten	4	7	4	3
14	(Australia) K Warwick	6	6	6	6
(Australia) T Little	6	1	2
3	(Australia) T Roche	7	6	6

Third round
11	(Australia) R Ruffels	6	6	7
(France) P Hagelauer	0	4	6
14	(Australia) K Warwick	1	2	6
3	(Australia) T Roche	6	6	7

Quarterfinals
11	(Australia) R Ruffels	7	2	6	7	6
3	(Australia) T Roche	6	6	7	6	4

=== Section 4 ===
First round
(Australia) W Durham	6	7	3	6
(Australia) E Ewert	3	5	6	2
(Australia) C Dibley	3	4	4
10	(United States) C Pasarell	6	6	6
(Australia) D Carter	6	6	3	6
(Australia) G Busby	2	3	6	2
(Australia) K Hancock	3	6	2	4
7	(Australia) R Case	6	4	6	6
(New Zealand) C Lewis	6	6	6
(Austria) G Wimmer	1	2	4
(Australia) G Thomson	2	3	2
15	(South Africa) R Moore	6	6	6
(Czechoslovakia) J Kukal	7	7	7
(Sweden) U Eriksson	5	5	5
(West Germany) R Gehring	6	1	6
2	(Australia) J Newcombe	7	6	7

Second round
(Australia) W Durham	4	2	4
10	(United States) C Pasarell	6	6	6
(Australia) D Carter	4	3	2
7	(Australia) R Case	6	6	6
(New Zealand) C Lewis	2	6	6	2
15	(South Africa) R Moore	6	7	3	6
(Czech Republic) J Kukal	3	4	2
2	(Australia) J Newcombe	6	6	6

Third round
10	(United States) C Pasarell	3	3	4
7	(Australia) R Case	6	6	6
15	(South Africa) R Moore	6	4	2
2	(Australia) J Newcombe	7	6	6

Quarterfinals
7	(Australia) R Case	4	4	1
2	(Australia) J Newcombe	6	6	6

Preceded by 1975 US Open	Grand Slam men's singles	Succeeded by 1976 French Open
