= 1977 New Zealand Open – Singles =

Singles
- 1977 New Zealand Open

Final
- Champion: (India) Vijay Amritraj
- Runner-up: (United States) Tim Wilkison
- Score: 7–6, 5–7, 6–1, 6–2

Details
- Draw: 32
- Seeds: 8

Events
Singles	Doubles
← 1976 ·	ATP Auckland Open	· 1978 →

Vijay Amritraj defeated Tim Wilkison 7–6, 5–7, 6–1, 6–2 to win the 1977 New Zealand Open singles competition. Onny Parun was the champion but did not defend his title.

== Seeds ==
A champion seed is indicated in bold text while text in italics indicates the round in which that seed was eliminated.

1. (India) Vijay Amritraj **(champion)**
2. (New Zealand) Chris Lewis (semifinals)
3. (New Zealand) Russell Simpson (quarterfinals)
4. (India) Anand Amritraj (second round)
5. (United Kingdom) Richard Lewis (semifinals)
6. (Australia) Steve Docherty (second round)
7. (Australia) Paul McNamee (first round)
8. (Australia) Bob Giltinan (first round)

== Draw ==
=== Key ===
- Q - Qualifier

NB: The Quarterfinals, Semifinals and Final were the best of 5 sets while the First and Second Round were the best of 3 sets.

=== Final ===
Final
1	(India) **Vijay Amritraj**	**7**	5	**6**	**6**
	(United States) Tim Wilkison	6	**7**	1	2

=== Section 1 ===
First round
1	(India) **V Amritraj**	**6**	**6**
(Australia) D Collings	4	2
(Australia) P Campbell	4	4
Q	(Canada) **D Brown**	**6**	**6**
7	(Australia) P McNamee	2	6
(Greece) **N Kelaidis**	**6**	**7**
(New Zealand) G Slater	6	2
(Australia) **P McNamara**	**7**	**6**
3	(New Zealand) **R Simpson**	**6**	**7**
(United States) S Mott	4	5
(United Kingdom) J Smith	4	**6**	4
(Australia) **J Trickey**	**6**	3	**6**
5	(United Kingdom) **R Lewis**	**6**	**6**
Q	(New Zealand) R Hawkes	4	2
(Australia) **P Langsford**	**6**	**6**
(United States) J Bailey	2	3

Second round
1	(India) **V Amritraj**	**6**	**6**
Q	(Canada) D Brown	1	1
(Greece) N Kelaidis	2	4
(Australia) **P McNamara**	**6**	**6**
3	(New Zealand) **R Simpson**	**6**	**6**
(United States) J Trickey	3	4
5	(United Kingdom) **R Lewis**	**6**	3	**6**
(Australia) P Langsford	4	**6**	3

Quarterfinals
1	(India) **V Amritraj**	**6**	**6**	**6**
(Australia) P McNamara	0	4	1
3	(New Zealand) R Simpson	5	5	6
5	(United Kingdom) **R Lewis**	**7**	**7**	**7**

Semifinals
1	(India) **V Amritraj**	**7**	4	**7**	5	**6**
5	(United Kingdom) R Lewis	5	**6**	6	**7**	1

=== Section 2 ===
First round
Q	(New Zealand) G Oliver	3	**7**	3
(United States) **T Wilkison**	**6**	6	**6**
(New Zealand) J Mills	6	1
6	(Australia) **S Docherty**	**7**	**6**
(United States) W Lofgren	4	4
(Australia) **E Ewert**	**6**	**6**
(Australia) S Myers	0	1
4	(India) **A Amritraj**	**6**	**6**
(Iran) M Bahrami	2	4
(Australia) **R Frawley**	**6**	**6**
(United States) **J Holladay**	**7**	**6**
8	(Australia) B Giltinan	5	1
(United States) D Martin, Jr.	4	6
Q	(New Zealand) **D Simmonds**	**6**	**7**
(Australia) G Braun	1	1
2	(New Zealand) **C Lewis**	**6**	**6**

Second round
(United States) **T Wilkison**	**6**	**6**
6	(Australia) S Docherty	4	1
(Australia) **E Ewert**	**7**	**6**
4	(India) A Amritraj	6	2
(Australia) **R Frawley**	**6**	2	**6**
(United States) J Holladay	0	**6**	4
Q	(New Zealand) D Simmonds	2	4
2	(New Zealand) **C Lewis**	**6**	**6**

Quarterfinals
(United States) **T Wilkison**	**6**	6	**6**	**6**
(Australia) E Ewert	1	**7**	3	4
(Australia) R Frawley	2	2	3
2	(New Zealand) **C Lewis**	**6**	**6**	**6**

Semifinals
(United States) **T Wilkison**	4	**7**	**6**	**6**
2	(New Zealand) C Lewis	**6**	6	4	2
