= Western Australian Hard Court Open Championships =

Defunct tennis tournament
- Tour: ILTF Circuit
- Founded: 1922; 103 years ago
- Abolished: 1983; 42 years ago
- Location: Albany; Bruce Rock; Greenville; Katanning; Kukerin; Pingelly; Wongan Hills
- Venue: Albany Tennis Club (1922–39); Various (1946–83)
- Surface: Clay

The Western Australian Hard Court Open Championships formally known as the Western Australian Hard Court Championships was a combined men's and women's clay court tennis tournament founded in 1922 as the Hard Court Championships of the Great Southern District. The tournament was organised by the Western Australia Lawn Tennis Association and first played at the Albany Tennis Club, Mount Lawley Park, Albany, Western Australia. It ran annually until 1983. when it was discontinued

== History ==
In January 1922 the Hard Court Championships of the Great Southern District was etsblished at the Albany Tennis Club, Mount Lawley Park, Albany, Western Australia, Australia. The first winners of the men's singles was Ronald Coote, and the winner of the women's singles event was Phyllis Richardson. In December 1926 it became a fully sanctioned event of the Western Australia Lawn Tennis Association and the tournament was renamed as the Western Australian State Hard Court Championships.

The championships continued to be held in Albany until 1939. In 1940 they were moved to Geraldton. The event was not held from 1941 to 19454 due to World War II. In 1946 the tournament resumed and was played in Kalgoorlie. It was then held at various location throughout its run including Bruce Rock, Greenville, Katanning, Kukerin, Pingelly and Wongan Hills.

In 1983 the tournament was last held at was discontinued the final winner of the men's singles event was Robert (Bob) Casey. The final women's singles champion was Christine Matison.

== Finals ==
=== Men's singles ===
(incomplete roll)

Year	Location	Champion	Runner-up	Score
1922	Albany	(Australia) Ronald Francis Charles Coote	(Australia) Loyal Forte	6–3, 3–6, 6–3
1923	Albany	(Australia) Clement Leonard Evans	(Australia) Samuel Stedman Glyde	6–0, 6–4
1924	Albany	(Australia) Clement Leonard Evans	(Australia) Reginald W. Richardson	6–3, 0–6, 6–4, 6–4
1925	Albany	(Australia) Edward William Sturm	(Australia) Arthur G. Range Uglow	6–0, 7–5, 6–3
1926	Albany	(Australia) Ernest Malcolm Ladyman	(Australia) Edward William Sturm	7–5, 6–3, 3–6, 6–2
1927	Albany	(Australia) Robert Whitelock (Bob) Phillips	(Australia) Ernest Malcolm Ladyman	6–4, 6–3, 6–4
1928	Albany	(Australia) Clarence Leslie Treloar	(Australia) Eric John Bray	6–0, 6–1, 6–2
1929	Albany	(Australia) William Henry Halliday	(Australia) Jack Fraser	6–3, 6–1, 6–1
1930	Albany	(Australia) Harry Stapledon	(Australia) Clarence Leslie Treloar	6–0 6–3, 1–6, 4–6, 6–0
1931	Albany	(Australia) Harry Stapledon	(Australia) Ronald Douglas Ford	6–4, 6–4, 1–6, 6–4
1932	Albany	(Australia) Ronald Douglas Ford	(Australia) William Henry Halliday	6–4, 3–6, 6–0, 3–6, 6–0
1933	Albany	(Australia) Ronald Douglas Ford	(Australia) Robert Coles Reitze	6–4, 6–0, 6–1
1934	Albany	(Australia) Jack Langdon	(Australia) Arthur Patrick Hinds	8–6, 6–0, 6–2
1935	Albany	(Australia) Edward Butt	(Australia) Jack Langdon	7–5, 6–2, 4–6, 6–2
1936	Albany	(Australia) Ernest Malcolm Ladyman	(Australia) Jack Langdon	6–3, 6–3
1937	Albany	(Australia) Vern Hall	(Australia) William Henderson Davis	6–1, 3–6 8–6 4–6 6–4
1938	Albany	(Australia) Ronald Douglas Ford	(Australia) Keith Allen Hough	6–3, 7–5, 6–3
1939	Albany	(Australia) Jack Langdon	(Australia) William Henry Halliday	6–4, 6–2, 6–4
1940	Geraldton	(Australia) Max Bonner	(Australia) Ronald Henry Stephen	6–0, 6–3, 6–2
1941	Geraldton	(Australia) John Bromwich	(Australia) Max Bonner	6–3, 6–1, 6–2
1942/1945	Not held (due to World War II)			
1946	Kalgoorlie	(Australia) Herbert Parfitt Blacker	(Australia) Ronald Henry Stephen	6–3, 4–6, 2–6, 6–0, 6–1
1947.	Albany	(Australia) William Frederick Stephen	(Australia) Ronald Henry Stephen	6–0, 6–3, 6–2
1948	Katanning	(Australia) Arthur Vernon Hall	(Australia) Max McDermott	1–6, 6–3, 6–4, 6–3
1949	Geraldton	(Australia) Clive Eric Wilderspin	(Australia) William Frederick Stephen	6–3, 6–3, 6–0
1950	Kalgoorlie	(Australia) Clive Eric Wilderspin	(Australia) Keith Edwin Holten	10–8, 6–2, 6–1
1951	Pingelly	(Australia) John Edward Blacklock	(Australia) Clive Eric Wilderspin	7–5, 6–4, 4–6, 4–6, 6–2
1952	Albany	(Australia) Dawson Cecil Hamilton	(Australia) Laurie Quan	6–1, 7–5 9–7
1953	Kalgoorlie	(Australia) Dawson Cecil Hamilton	(Australia) John Blacklock	1–6, 6–1, 6–4, 5–7, 6–1
1954	Toodyay	(Australia) Geoffrey Oswald Strang	(Australia) Ronald L. Hunt	6–3, 0–6, 6–3, 5–7, 6–0
1960	Geraldton	(Australia) Arthur James Catchpole	(Australia) Wayne Millen	6–2,6–4
1961	Bruce Rock	(Australia) Rob Kilderry	(Australia) Geoff Strang	7–5, 6–4, 6–2
1962	Bruce Rock	(Australia) Wayne Millen	(Australia) Colin Bell	6–4, 6–4, 3–6, 6–2
1963	Bruce Rock	(Australia) Peter Harris	(Australia) Peter McPherson	9–6
1964	Bruce Rock	(Australia) Timothy John Clayton	(Australia) Douglas Napier	6–3, 6–1
1965	Kalgoorlie	(United States) Rob Cadwallader	(Australia) Michael Kenny	9–5
1966	Kalgoorlie	(Australia) Brian Bowman	(Australia) Colin Bell	6–1, 6–2
↓ Open Era ↓
1969	Bruce Rock	(Australia) Gary Penberthy	(Australia) Daniel Hogan	6–3, 7–5, 6–1
1973	Greenville	(Australia) Robert Aidan Casey	(Australia) Alan Wall	6–3, 14–12
1975	Kalgoorlie	(Australia) Robert Aidan Casey	(Australia) Ross Olivieri	6–2, 6–4, 6–4
1976 *	Kukerin	(Australia) Robert Aidan Casey	(Australia) Ross Olivieri	4–6, 6–2, 6–2, 6–2
1976 **	Kukerin	(Australia) Robert Aidan Casey	(Australia) Gary Penberthy	6–4, 6–4
1978	Kondinin	(Australia) Ian Bersan	(Australia) Robert Aidan Casey	6–3. 6–3
1979	Katanning	(Australia) Gary Penberthy	(Australia) Larry Hall	6–0, 6–3
1983	Wongan Hills	(Australia) Robert Aidan Casey	(Australia) Brian Williams	6–4, 6–3

=== Women's singles ===
(incomplete roll)

Year	Location	Champion	Runner-up	Score
1922	Albany	(Australia) Phyllis Richardson	(Australia) Marjorie Foulkes-Taylor	?
1923	Albany	(Australia) Phyllis Richardson	(Australia) Marjorie Foulkes-Taylor	6–2, 6–1
1924	Albany	(Australia) Phyllis Richardson	(Australia) Mrs E.J. Stuart	6–4, 6–4
1925	Albany	(Australia) Marjorie Foulkes-Taylor	(Australia) Mrs Grace	6–4, 9–7
1926	Albany	(Australia) Phyllis Richardson	(Australia) Peggy Murray	6–2, 3–6, 6–3
1927	Albany	(Australia) Phyllis Richardson	(Australia) Marion Barker	6–3, 6–4
1928	Albany	(Australia) Phyllis Richardson	(Australia) Venetia Thompson Fyfe	6–0, 6–2
1929	Albany	(Australia) Phyllis Richardson	(Australia) Mrs H.J. Frank	6–2, 6–3
1930	Albany	(Australia) Ida Wedin MacBeth	(Australia) Marion Barker	1–6, 8–6, 6–1
1931	Albany	(Australia) Marion Barker	(Australia) Bessie Spencer Ford	6–2, 6–1
1932	Albany	(Australia) Pearl Jamieson	(Australia) Rosie Collins	3–6, 6–3, 6–4
1933	Albany	(Australia) Rosie Collins	(Australia) Mary Paterson	6–4, 6–4
1934	Albany	(Australia) Pearl Jamieson	(Australia) Phyllis Richardson	7–5, 6–8, 6–3
1935	Albany	(Australia) Pearl Jamieson	(Australia) Phyllis Richardson	9–7, 6–4
1936	Albany	(Australia) Phyllis Richardson	(Australia) Rosie Collins	7–5, 6–2
1937	Albany	(Australia) Pearl Jamieson	(Australia) Rosie Collins	7–5, 6–1
1938	Albany	(Australia) Rosie Collins	(Australia) Mrs Stella Lings	6–1, 6–1
1939	Albany	(Australia) Joan Crisp	(Australia) Gwen Nicolson	7–5, 6–2
1940	Geraldton	(Australia) Mavis Williams Cooke	(Australia) Mary Paterson	6–4, 5–7, 6–4
1942/1945	Not held (due to World War II)			
1946	Kalgoorlie	(Australia) Rona Ryan	(Australia) Pauline Graham	1–6, 6–4, 6–4
1947	Albany	(Australia) Margot Grace	(Australia) Mavis Williams Cooke	6–1, 4–6, 6–1
1948	Katanning	(Australia) Rona Ryan	(Australia) Margot Grace	7–5, 9–7
1949	Geraldton	(Australia) Marina Nicholas	(Australia) Margot Grace	1–6, 6–3, 6–0
1950	Kalgoorlie	(Australia) Valmai Watts Bandy	(Australia) Mrs S. Robinson	4–6, 6–1, 6–2
1951	Pingelly	(Australia) Patricia Cunningham	(Australia) Valmai Watts Bandy	6–3, 3–6, 8–6
1952	Albany	(Australia) Joan Ryan	(Australia) Patricia Cunningham	6–3, 6–0
1953	Kalgoorlie	(Australia) Mary Blacklock	(Australia) Rona Ryan Hesford	?
1954	Toodyay	(Australia) Mary MacFarlane White	(Australia) Patricia Cunningham Holmes	8–6, 4–3 retd.
1965	Kalgoorlie	(Australia) S. Stephen	(Australia) Dianne Born	9–7 ?
1966	Kalgoorlie	(Australia) Lesley Hunt	(Australia) D. Griffiths	6–3, 6–0
↓ Open Era ↓
1973	Greenwille	(Australia) Vicki Lancaster	(Australia) Keryl Chute	6–2, 2–6, 6–2
1975	Kalgoorlie	(Australia) Michelle Pekovitch	(Australia) Maureen Smith	6–3, 6–4
1976	Kukerin	(Australia) Christine Matison	(Australia) L. Cooper	6–4, 6–4
1976	Bruce Rock	(Australia) Mary Sawyer	(Australia) Christine Matison	6–4, 2–6, 6–4
1978	Kondinin	(Australia) Christine Matison	(Australia) L. Cooper	7–5, 6–2
1979	Katanning	(Australia) Christine Matison	(Australia) C. Ainscough	6–0, 6–3
1983	Wongan Hills	(Australia) Christine Matison	(Australia) L. Cooper	4–6, 6–2, 6–0
