= 1975 Australian Open – Men's doubles =

Men's doubles
- 1975 Australian Open

Final
- Champions: (Australia) John Alexander (Australia) Phil Dent
- Runners-up: (Australia) Bob Carmichael (Australia) Allan Stone
- Score: 6–3, 7–6

Details
- Draw: 32
- Seeds: 8

Events
Singles	men	women		boys	girls
Doubles	men	women	mixed	boys	girls
WC Singles	men	women	quad
WC Doubles	men	women	quad
Legends	men	women	mixed
- Australian Open

Ross Case and Geoff Masters were the defending champions and second seeds, but they lost to unseeded West Germans Harald Elschenbroich and Rolf Gehring in the first round.

In an all-Australian final on home soil (for the fourth year in a row), the third seeds John Alexander and Phil Dent defeated the fifth seeds Bob Carmichael and Allan Stone to win the title, 6–3, 7–6. This was Alexander's first Grand Slam title (he would later win the 1982 Australian Open with John Fitzgerald) and Dent's first and only Grand Slam title.

== Seeds ==
1. (Australia) John Newcombe / (Australia) Tony Roche (semifinals)
2. (Australia) Ross Case / (Australia) Geoff Masters (first round)
3. (Australia) John Alexander / (Australia) Phil Dent (champion)
4. (Australia) Colin Dibley / (Australia) Ray Ruffels (quarterfinals)
5. (Australia) Bob Carmichael / (Australia) Allan Stone (final)
6. (United States) John Andrews / (India) Sashi Menon (quarterfinals)
7. (Australia) Syd Ball / (Australia) Kim Warwick (semifinals)
8. (Australia) Neale Fraser / (Australia) Bob Giltinan (second round)

== Draw ==
Key

- Q = Qualifier
- WC = Wild card
- LL = Lucky loser
- Alt = Alternate
- ITF = ITF entry
- PR = Protected ranking
- SR = Special ranking
- SE = Special exempt
- JE = Junior exempt
- JR = Junior Accelerator Programme entrant
- CO = College Accelerator Programme entrant
- NG = Next Gen Accelerator Program entrant
- w/o = Walkover
- r = Retired
- d = Defaulted

=== Finals ===
Semifinals
1	(Australia) John Newcombe (Australia) Tony Roche
5	(Australia) Bob Carmichael (Australia) Allan Stone	w/o
3	(Australia) John Alexander (Australia) Phil Dent	7	6
7	(Australia) Syd Ball (Australia) Kim Warwick	6	3

Final
5	(Australia) Bob Carmichael (Australia) Allan Stone	3	6
3	(Australia) John Alexander (Australia) Phil Dent	6	7

=== Top half ===
First round
1	(Australia) J Newcombe (Australia) T Roche	6	6
(West Germany) H Elschenbroich (West Germany) R Gehring	2	2
(Japan) K Hirai (Japan) T Sakai	4	4
(Australia) W Coghlan (Australia) C Stubs	6	6
(Australia) D Crealy (Australia) R Keldie	6	6
(West Germany) U Marten (West Germany) U Pinner	3	4
(Australia) K Hiskins (Sweden) K Johansson	3	3
8	(Australia) N Fraser (Australia) B Giltinan	6	6
5	(Australia) B Carmichael (Australia) A Stone	6	6
(Australia) E Ewert (Australia) C Kachel	4	4
(Australia) T Little (Australia) J Trickey	3	3
(United States) M Machette (United States) R Reid	6	6
(United States) J Connors (United States) S Segura	4	4
(Australia) J Eastburn (Australia) W Jacques	6	6
(South Africa) T Fancutt (New Zealand) J Ross	4	3
4	(Australia) C Dibley (Australia) R Ruffels	6	6

Second round
1	(Australia) J Newcombe (Australia) T Roche	6	6
(Australia) W Coghlan (Australia) C Stubs	4	3
(Australia) D Crealy (Australia) R Keldie	w/o
8	(Australia) N Fraser (Australia) B Giltinan
5	(Australia) B Carmichael (Australia) A Stone	6	6
(United States) M Machette (United States) R Reid	3	4
(Australia) J Eastburn (Australia) W Jacques	4	6
4	(Australia) C Dibley (Australia) R Ruffels	6	7

Quarterfinals
1	(Australia) J Newcombe (Australia) T Roche	6	6
(Australia) D Crealy (Australia) R Keldie	0	3
5	(Australia) B Carmichael (Australia) A Stone	6	6
4	(Australia) C Dibley (Australia) R Ruffels	4	4

Semifinals
1	(Australia) J Newcombe (Australia) T Roche
5	(Australia) B Carmichael (Australia) A Stone	w/o

=== Bottom half ===
First round
3	(Australia) J Alexander (Australia) P Dent	6	6
(Australia) A Dawson (Australia) P McNamara	3	4
(Australia) W Durham (Australia) C Letcher	6	6
(Japan) S Kato (Japan) J Kuki	2	2
(United Kingdom) R Lewis (United Kingdom) M Robinson	4	3
(Socialist Federal Republic of Yugoslavia) I Košak (Socialist Federal Republic of Yugoslavia) D Savic	6	6
(Australia) J Marks (Soviet Union) A Metreweli	3	3
6	(United States) J Andrews (India) S Menon	6	6
7	(Australia) S Ball (Australia) K Warwick	6	6
(Mexico) J Loyo Mayo (India) J Singh	3	2
(Australia) A Gardiner (Australia) G Thomson	6	6
(Socialist Federal Republic of Yugoslavia) N Spear (Japan) K Tanabe	4	4
(Australia) P McNamee (Socialist Federal Republic of Yugoslavia) D Stojović	6	6
(Australia) J Mackay (Australia) M Senior	3	3
(Australia) P Doerner (Australia) J James	6	6
2	(Australia) R Case (Australia) G Masters	4	4

Second round
3	(Australia) J Alexander (Australia) P Dent	6	3	6
(Australia) W Durham (Australia) C Letcher	3	6	2
(Socialist Federal Republic of Yugoslavia) I Košak (Socialist Federal Republic of Yugoslavia) D Savic	4	4
6	(United States) J Andrews (India) S Menon	6	6
7	(Australia) S Ball (Australia) K Warwick	6	7
(Australia) A Gardiner (Australia) G Thomson	4	6
(Australia) P McNamee (Socialist Federal Republic of Yugoslavia) D Stojović	3	4
(Australia) P Doerner (Australia) J James	6	6

Quarterfinals
3	(Australia) J Alexander (Australia) P Dent	6	4	6
6	(United States) J Andrews (India) S Menon	4	6	4
7	(Australia) S Ball (Australia) K Warwick	6	4	6
(Australia) P Doerner (Australia) J James	3	6	3

Semifinals
3	(Australia) J Alexander (Australia) P Dent	7	6
7	(Australia) S Ball (Australia) K Warwick	6	3
