= Sachio Kato =

Japanese tennis player (born 1948)

- Country (sports): Japan
- Born: 13 August 1948 (age 77)

Singles
- Highest ranking: No. 237 (14 June 1976)

Grand Slam singles results
- Australian Open: 1R (1975)
- French Open: Q2 (1975)
- Wimbledon: Q1 (1974, 1975, 1976)

Doubles

Grand Slam doubles results
- Australian Open: 1R (1975)

Sachio Kato (born 13 August 1948) is a Japanese former professional tennis player.

Kato featured in Japan's 1975 and 1977 Davis Cup campaigns, winning two singles and two doubles rubbers. While on tour with the Davis Cup squad he competed in the main draw of the 1975 Australian Open. During his career he also appeared in the qualifying draws for the French Open and Wimbledon.

== See also ==
- List of Japan Davis Cup team representatives
