= Harry Brittain (tennis) =

Australian-born Canadian tennis player (born 1955)

- Full name: Harry Aaron Brittain
- Country (sports): Australia; Canada
- Born: 8 October 1955 (age 69)

Singles
- Career record: 1–2
- Highest ranking: No. 330 (2 June 1975)

Grand Slam singles results
- Wimbledon: Q1 (1975)

Harry Aaron Brittain (born 8 October 1955) is an Australian-born Canadian former professional tennis player.

Brittain was born into a Jewish family in Sydney and attended Punchbowl High School. He won the junior singles at the 1974 Australian Open. His best singles world ranking was 330 and he featured in qualifying for the 1975 Wimbledon Championships. Immigrating to Canada, Brittain earned a place in their national top 10 rankings by the late 1970s.
