= 1975 Australian Open – Men's singles =

Men's singles
- 1975 Australian Open

Final
- Champion: (Australia) John Newcombe
- Runner-up: (United States) Jimmy Connors
- Score: 7–5, 3–6, 6–4, 7–6^{(9–7)}

Details
- Draw: 64
- Seeds: 8

Events
Singles	men	women		boys	girls
Doubles	men	women	mixed	boys	girls
WC Singles	men	women	quad
WC Doubles	men	women	quad
Legends	men	women	mixed
- Australian Open

John Newcombe defeated defending champion Jimmy Connors in the final, 7–5, 3–6, 6–4, 7–6^{(9–7)} to win the men's singles tennis title at the 1975 Australian Open. It was his seventh and last major singles title. Newcombe became the first man in the Open Era to win a major after saving match points, saving three against Tony Roche in the semifinals.

== Seeds ==
The seeded players are listed below. John Newcombe is the champion; others show the round in which they were eliminated.

1. (United States) Jimmy Connors (finalist)
2. (Australia) John Newcombe (champion)
3. (Australia) Tony Roche (semifinals)
4. (Australia) John Alexander (quarterfinals)
5. (Australia) Ross Case (first round)
6. (Soviet Union) Alex Metreveli (quarterfinals)
7. (Australia) Geoff Masters (quarterfinals)
8. (Australia) Phil Dent (second round)

== Draw ==
=== Key ===
- Q = Qualifier
- WC = Wild card
- LL = Lucky loser
- r = Retired

=== Final eight ===
Quarterfinals
1	(United States) Jimmy Connors	6	6	6
(Australia) Kim Warwick	3	2	2
4	(Australia) John Alexander	3	6	3	6
(Australia) Dick Crealy	6	4	6	7
6	(Soviet Union) Alex Metreveli	6	6	4	3
3	(Australia) Tony Roche	7	3	6	6
7	(Australia) Geoff Masters	6	3	7	3	8
2	(Australia) John Newcombe	1	6	6	6	10

Semifinals
1	(United States) Jimmy Connors	6	6	6
(Australia) Dick Crealy	4	3	4
3	(Australia) Tony Roche	4	6	4	6	9
2	(Australia) John Newcombe	6	4	6	2	11

Final
1	(United States) Jimmy Connors	5	6	4	6
2	(Australia) John Newcombe	7	3	6	7

=== Section 1 ===
First round
1	(United States) J Connors	7	6	6
(Australia) C Kachel	5	2	3
(West Germany) U Pinner	6	7	6
(Japan) K Tanabe	1	6	3
(United States) GR Reid	6	6	6	6
(Australia) G Braun	1	7	2	1
(India) J Singh	6	7	6
(Australia) A Dawson	2	6	0
(Australia) G Thomson	6	6	6
(United States) M Prineas	4	3	3
(Australia) K Warwick	6	6	6
(Australia) K Hiskins	1	3	2
(West Germany) H Elschenbroich	7	6	6
(Socialist Federal Republic of Yugoslavia) N Špear	6	3	3
(France) H Gauvain	4	2	3
8	(Australia) P Dent	6	6	6

Second round
1	(United States) J Connors	6	6	6
(West Germany) U Pinner	3	3	2
(United States) GR Reid	7	4	6	6
(India) J Singh	6	6	3	3
(Australia) G Thomson	3	4	6
(Australia) K Warwick	6	6	7
(West Germany) H Elschenbroich	4	6	6	6
8	(Australia) P Dent	6	4	4	3

Third round
1	(United States) J Connors	6	6	5	6
(United States) GR Reid	2	3	7	0
(Australia) K Warwick	4	4	7	6	6
(West Germany) H Elschenbroich	6	6	6	4	2

Quarterfinals
1	(United States) J Connors	6	6	6
(Australia) K Warwick	3	2	2

=== Section 2 ===
First round
4	(Australia) J Alexander	3	7	6	6
(Australia) P Doerner	6	5	2	4
(Australia) M Edmondson	6	6	1	6	6
(Japan) T Sakai	1	2	6	7	4
(Australia) J James	6	7	6
(United States) S Segura	2	6	3
(Australia) A Stone	6	6	6
(Australia) S Myers	4	4	3
(Australia) W Bowrey	6	6	6
(Japan) S Kato	3	0	3
(United States) J Andrews	6	7	6
(Australia) G Perkins	3	6	3
(Australia) D Crealy	7	2	7	6
(Japan) J Kuki	5	6	5	3
(Australia) R Ruffels	4	6	6	6
5	(Australia) R Case	6	3	4	2

Second round
4	(Australia) J Alexander	6	6	4	6
(Australia) M Edmondson	3	4	6	1
(Australia) J James	4	6	7	6
(Australia) A Stone	6	7	6	8
(Australia) W Bowrey	2	3	1
(United States) J Andrews	6	6	6
(Australia) D Crealy	6	6	7
(Australia) R Ruffels	3	4	6

Third round
4	(Australia) J Alexander	6	6	7
(Australia) A Stone	2	4	5
(United States) J Andrews	2	4	6	6
(Australia) D Crealy	6	6	4	7

Quarterfinals
4	(Australia) J Alexander	3	6	3	6
(Australia) D Crealy	6	4	6	7

=== Section 3 ===
First round
6	(Soviet Union) A Metreveli	6	5	7	4	9
(Australia) S Ball	4	7	5	6	7
(United Kingdom) M Robinson	6	5	7	7
(Japan) K Hirai	1	7	5	6
(Australia) E Ewert	2	6	6	6
(Australia) D Carter	6	2	3	3
(Australia) C Letcher	3	7	7	6
(Australia) J Eastburn	6	6	5	0
(Mexico) J Loyo-Mayo	7	6	6
(Australia) N Fraser	6	4	4
(Australia) P McNamara	6	6	7
(Socialist Federal Republic of Yugoslavia) D Stojović	1	2	5
(Australia) C Dibley	6	6	6
(Australia) W Durham	3	4	2
(United States) M Machette	5	4	3
3	(Australia) T Roche	7	6	6

Second round
6	(Soviet Union) A Metreveli	6	6	6
(United Kingdom) M Robinson	3	1	0
(Australia) E Ewert	2	2	3
(Australia) C Letcher	6	6	6
(Mexico) J Loyo-Mayo	6	3	2	1
(Australia) P McNamara	3	6	6	6
(Australia) C Dibley	1	3	3
3	(Australia) T Roche	6	6	6

Third round
6	(Soviet Union) A Metreveli	6	6	7	6
(Australia) C Letcher	4	7	6	4
(Australia) P McNamara	6	5	2	3
3	(Australia) T Roche	4	7	6	6

Quarterfinals
6	(Soviet Union) A Metreveli	6	6	4	3
3	(Australia) T Roche	7	3	6	6

=== Section 4 ===
First round
7	(Australia) G Masters	6	6	6	7
(Australia) R Keldie	3	4	7	5
(Australia) F Sedgman	6	5	6	6
(United Kingdom) R Lewis	3	7	4	3
(France) P Beust	w/o
(Sweden) K Johansson
(Australia) B Giltinan	7	6	7
(Australia) J Trickey	5	4	6
(Australia) B Carmichael	6	6	6	6
(West Germany) U Marten	7	2	3	3
(India) S Menon	7	4	7	6
(Australia) W Coghlan	6	6	6	1
(West Germany) R Gehring	6	6	6
(Australia) C Stubs	3	2	4
(South Africa) T Fancutt	2	1	2
2	(Australia) J Newcombe	6	6	6

Second round
7	(Australia) G Masters	6	6	6
(Australia) F Sedgman	1	4	3
(France) P Beust	0	3	2
(Australia) B Giltinan	6	6	6
(Australia) B Carmichael	6	6	6
(India) S Menon	4	2	2
(West Germany) R Gehring	7	4	6	2	4
2	(Australia) J Newcombe	6	6	3	6	6

Third round
7	(Australia) G Masters	6	6	4
(Australia) B Giltinan	0	7	3^{r}
(Australia) B Carmichael	6	3	2
2	(Australia) J Newcombe	7	6	6

Quarterfinals
7	(Australia) G Masters	6	3	7	3	8
2	(Australia) J Newcombe	1	6	6	6	10

Preceded by 1974 US Open	Grand Slam men's singles	Succeeded by 1975 French Open
