= Chris Wells (tennis) =

British tennis player

- Full name: Christopher Wells
- Country (sports): Great Britain

Singles

Grand Slam singles results
- Wimbledon: Q3 (1975)

Doubles

Grand Slam doubles results
- Wimbledon: Q2 (1977, 1978)

Grand Slam mixed doubles results
- Wimbledon: 2R (1979)

Christopher Wells is a British former professional tennis player.

Wells, based in London, was a British under-21 singles champion.

Active on tour in the 1970s, Wells made several attempts to qualify for the singles main draw at Wimbledon and featured in the mixed doubles main draw in 1979 (with Debbie Parker).
