= 1975 New Zealand Open =

- Date: 6–12 January
- Edition: 8th
- Category: Independent
- Draw: 32S / 16D
- Prize money: $25,000
- Surface: Grass
- Location: Auckland, New Zealand

Champions

Singles
- (New Zealand) Onny Parun

Doubles
- (Australia) Bob Carmichael / (Australia) Ray Ruffels
← 1974 ·	ATP Auckland Open	· 1976 →

The 1975 New Zealand Open, also known as Benson and Hedges Open for sponsorship reasons, was a professional men's tennis tournament held in Auckland, New Zealand. It was an independent event, i.e. not part of the 1975 Grand Prix or 1975 World Championship Tennis circuit. It was the eighth edition of the tournament and was played on outdoor grass courts from 6 January through 12 January 1975. First-seeded Onny Parun won the singles title.

== Finals ==
=== Singles ===
(New Zealand) Onny Parun defeated (New Zealand) Brian Fairlie 4–6, 6–4, 6–4, 6–7, 6–4

- It was Parun's only title of the year and the 5th of his career.

=== Doubles ===
(Australia) Bob Carmichael / (Australia) Ray Ruffels defeated (New Zealand) Brian Fairlie / (New Zealand) Onny Parun 7–6, RET (Note: Fairlie and Parun retired after losing the first set as it started to rain and they had to leave for India in preparation of the Davis Cup match against Australia.)

- It was Carmichael's only title of the year and the 10th of his career. It was Ruffels's 1st title of the year and the 7th of his career.
