= Frédérique Thibault =

French tennis player

- Full name: Frédérique Thibault
- Country (sports): France
- Born: 2 June 1954 (age 70)

Singles

Grand Slam singles results
- Australian Open: 2R (1975)
- French Open: 3R (1978)
- Wimbledon: 1R (1978, 1979)
- US Open: 2R (1978, 1980)

Doubles

Grand Slam doubles results
- Australian Open: 2R (1975)
- French Open: 3R (1983)
- Wimbledon: 1R (1979)
- US Open: 3R (1979)

Frédérique Thibault (born 2 June 1954) is a former professional tennis player from France.

Between 1977 and 1982, Thibault featured in 16 Federation Cup ties for France, winning nine matches.

Thibault competed in all four grand slam tournaments during her career, with her best performance a round of 16 appearance at the 1978 French Open, where she was beaten by eventual champion Virginia Ruzici.

== See also ==
- List of France Fed Cup team representatives
