= Mike Prineas =

American tennis player

- Full name: Michael Prineas
- Country (sports): United States
- Born: Seattle, Washington
- Height: 6 ft 2 in (188 cm)

Singles
- Career record: 0–6

Grand Slam singles results
- Australian Open: 1R (1975)
- French Open: Q1 (1975)
- Wimbledon: Q1 (1975)

Doubles
- Career record: 0–3

Michael Prineas is an American former professional tennis player.

Prineas, a Seattle-born player of Greek descent, attended Seattle University and competed in three seasons of varsity tennis during the early 1970s. He was the West Coast Athletic Conference singles champion in 1972 and following his freshman year was the top-ranked collegiate player in the Pacific Northwest.

After leaving university he played on the professional tour and featured in the main draw of the 1975 Australian Open.

Since the 1980s, Prineas has been the proprietor of restaurants and nightclubs in the Seattle area.
