= 1976 New Zealand Open =

Tennis tournament

- Date: 5 – 11 January 1976
- Edition: 9th
- Category: Independent
- Draw: 32S
- Surface: Hard / outdoor
- Location: Auckland, New Zealand

Champions

Singles
- (New Zealand) Onny Parun
← 1975 ·	New Zealand Open	· 1977 →

The 1976 New Zealand Open was a men's professional tennis tournament held in Auckland, New Zealand. It was an independent event, i.e. not part of the 1976 Grand Prix or 1976 World Championship Tennis circuit. The annual tournament was played on outdoor hard courts and was held from 5 to 11 January 1976. Onny Parun won the singles title.

== Finals ==
=== Singles ===
(Australia) Onny Parun defeated (Australia) Allan Stone 7–6, 7–6, 6–3

- It was Parun's 1st title of the year and the 6th of his career.
