= 1977 New Zealand Open =

- Date: 10–16 January
- Edition: 10th
- Category: Non-tour
- Draw: 32S / 16D
- Prize money: $25,000
- Surface: Grass
- Location: Auckland, New Zealand
- Venue: Stanley Street courts

Champions

Singles
- (India) Vijay Amritraj

Doubles
- (New Zealand) Chris Lewis / (New Zealand) Russell Simpson
← 1976 ·	New Zealand Open	· 1978 →

The 1977 New Zealand Open was a men's professional tennis tournament played on outdoor grass courts at the Stanley Street courts in Auckland, New Zealand that was held from 10 January through 16 January 1977. It was the tenth edition of the tournament. First-seeded Vijay Amritraj won the singles title.

== Finals ==
=== Singles ===
(India) Vijay Amritraj defeated (United States) Tim Wilkison 7–6, 5–7, 6–1, 6–2

- It was Amritraj's 1st title of the year and the 14th of his career.

=== Doubles ===
(New Zealand) Chris Lewis / (New Zealand) Russell Simpson defeated (Australia) Peter Langsford / (United Kingdom) Jonathan Smith 7–6, 6–4

- It was Lewis's 1st title of the year and the 1st of his career. It was Simpson's 1st title of the year and the 2nd of his career.
