= Tony Fawcett =

South African tennis player

- Full name: Anthony Fawcett
- Country (sports): Rhodesia
- Born: 29 June 1951 (age 75)

Singles
- Career record: 2–9
- Highest ranking: No. 221 (June 14, 1976)

Grand Slam singles results
- Wimbledon: 1R (1975)

Doubles
- Career record: 1–5

Grand Slam doubles results
- Wimbledon: 1R (1970, 1972)

Grand Slam mixed doubles results
- Wimbledon: 2R (1970)

Anthony Fawcett (born 29 June 1951) is a South African former professional tennis player active in the 1970s.

Fawcett, who competed under the flag of Rhodesia, was a singles main draw qualifier at the 1975 Wimbledon Championships. He played what is believed to be the longest game in tennis history during his match against Keith Glass at the Surrey Championships in 1975. Glass's service game contained 37 deuces. Although not timed, the game went long enough that as it was ongoing, a women's match on an adjacent court began and finished.
