= 1978 New Zealand Open =

- Date: 2–8 January
- Edition: 11th
- Category: Challenger Series
- Draw: 32S / 16D
- Prize money: $25,000
- Surface: Hard / outdoor
- Location: Auckland, New Zealand

Champions

Singles
- (United States) Eliot Teltscher

Doubles
- (New Zealand) Chris Lewis / (New Zealand) Russell Simpson
← 1977 ·	New Zealand Open	· 1979 →

The 1978 New Zealand Open, also known by its sponsored name Benson & Hedges New Zealand Open, was a men's professional tennis tournament held in Auckland, New Zealand. It was a non-tour event, i.e. not part of the 1978 Grand Prix circuit. It was the 11th edition of the tournament and was played on outdoor hard courts and was held from 2 January through 8 January 1978. Eliot Teltscher won the singles title.

== Finals ==
=== Singles ===
(United States) Eliot Teltscher defeated (New Zealand) Onny Parun 6–3, 7–5, 6–1

=== Doubles ===
(New Zealand) Chris Lewis / (New Zealand) Russell Simpson defeated (Australia) Rod Frawley / (West Germany) Karl Meiler 6–1, 7–6
