= Phil Dent =

Australian tennis player

- Full name: Philip Clive Dent
- Country (sports): Australia
- Residence: Grapevine, Texas, U.S.
- Born: 14 February 1950 (age 76) Sydney, New South Wales, Australia
- Height: 182 cm (5 ft 11 1/2 in)
- Turned pro: 1968 (amateur from 1967)
- Retired: 1983
- Plays: Right-handed (one-handed backhand)

Singles
- Career record: 411–348 (54.2%)
- Career titles: 3
- Highest ranking: No. 17 (23 August 1977)

Grand Slam singles results
- Australian Open: F (1974)
- French Open: SF (1977)
- Wimbledon: QF (1977)
- US Open: 3R (1973)

Doubles
- Career record: 409–253 (61.8%)
- Career titles: 25
- Highest ranking: No. 9 (23 August 1977)

Grand Slam doubles results
- Australian Open: W (1975)
- French Open: F (1975, 1979)
- Wimbledon: F (1977)
- US Open: QF (1972, 1973, 1975)

Grand Slam mixed doubles results
- US Open: W (1976)

Team competitions
- Davis Cup: W (1977)

Philip Clive Dent (born 14 February 1950) is an Australian former professional tennis player. Dent's high water mark as a pro singles player was reaching the Australian Open final in 1974, which he lost to Jimmy Connors in four sets. Dent was also the men's doubles champion at the Australian Open in 1975 (with teammate John Alexander), and the mixed-doubles champion at the US Open in 1976 (with teammate Billie Jean King).

== Tennis career ==
As well as his victory in the 1975 Australian Open doubles, Dent reached six more men's doubles finals in Grand Slam Tournaments, finishing runner-up at the Australian Open in 1970, 1973, and 1977, the French Open in 1975 and 1979 and Wimbledon in 1977. Dent was a member of the Australian tennis teams that won the Davis Cup in 1977 and the World Team Cup in 1979.

Before turning professional, Dent won the boys' singles titles at both the Australian Open tournament and at the French Open in 1968.

During his professional career, Dent won three top-level singles titles (in Sydney and in Brisbane, Australia, both in 1979, and the former also in 1971) and 25 doubles titles (also winning the 1968 Australian Hard Courts singles event in Launceston). His career-high singles ranking was world No. 12 (in 1977). Dent retired from professional tennis in 1983.

Dent defeated Björn Borg in the third round of the 1974 Australian Open, the only Australian Open in which he competed.

After retiring as a player, Dent settled in Newport Beach, California. Dent was married to Betty Ann Grubb Stuart and their son, Taylor Dent was also a professional tennis player and citizen of the United States. Phil now lives in Texas, where he, his son, and his daughter-in-law Jennifer own a tennis academy.

== Grand Slam finals ==
=== Singles: (1 runner-up) ===
| Result | Year | Championship | Surface | Opponent | Score |
|---|---|---|---|---|---|
| Loss | 1974 | Australian Open | Grass | (United States) Jimmy Connors | 6–7^{(7–9)}, 4–6, 6–4, 3–6 |

=== Doubles: (1 title, 6 runner-ups) ===
| Result | Year | Championship | Surface | Partner | Opponents | Score |
|---|---|---|---|---|---|---|
| Loss | 1970 | Australian Open | Grass | (Australia) John Alexander | (United States) Bob Lutz (United States) Stan Smith | 3–6, 6–8, 3–6 |
| Loss | 1973 | Australian Open | Grass | (Australia) John Alexander | (Australia) Mal Anderson (Australia) John Newcombe | 3–6, 4–6, 6–7 |
| Win | 1975 | Australian Open | Grass | (Australia) John Alexander | (Australia) Bob Carmichael (Australia) Allan Stone | 6–3, 7–6 |
| Loss | 1975 | French Open | Grass | (Australia) John Alexander | (United States) Brian Gottfried (Mexico) Raúl Ramírez | 4–6, 6–2, 2–6, 4–6 |
| Loss | 1977 | Wimbledon | Grass | (Australia) John Alexander | (Australia) Ross Case (Australia) Geoff Masters | 3–6, 4–6, 6–3, 9–8^{(7–4)}, 4–6 |
| Loss | 1977 | Australian Open | Grass | (Australia) John Alexander | (Australia) Ray Ruffels (Australia) Allan Stone | 6–7, 6–7 |
| Loss | 1979 | French Open | Grass | (Australia) Ross Case | (United States) Gene Mayer (United States) Sandy Mayer | 4–6, 4–6, 4–6 |

=== Mixed doubles: (1 title) ===
| Result | Year | Championship | Surface | Partner | Opponents | Score |
|---|---|---|---|---|---|---|
| Win | 1976 | US Open | Grass | (United States) Billie Jean King | (South Africa) Frew McMillan (Netherlands) Betty Stöve | 3–6, 6–2, 7–5 |

== Grand Slam performance timeline ==
Key
| W | F | SF | QF | #R | RR | Q# | P# | DNQ | A | Z# | PO | G | S | B | NMS | NTI | P | NH |

(W) winner; (F) finalist; (SF) semifinalist; (QF) quarterfinalist; (#R) rounds 4, 3, 2, 1; (RR) round-robin stage; (Q#) qualification round; (DNQ) did not qualify; (A) absent; (NH) not held; (SR) strike rate (events won / competed); (W–L) win–loss record.

=== Singles ===
| Tournament | 1967 | 1968 | 1969 | 1970 | 1971 | 1972 | 1973 | 1974 | 1975 | 1976 | 1977 | | 1978 | 1979 | 1980 | 1981 | 1982 | 1983 | Career SR |
|---|---|---|---|---|---|---|---|---|---|---|---|---|---|---|---|---|---|---|---|
| Australian Open | 1R | QF | 2R | 3R | 2R | A | 1R | F | 2R | 2R | QF | 2R | 2R | QF | 3R | 3R | 4R | 2R | 0 / 17 |
| French Open | A | P1 | 2R | 3R | 1R | A | 3R | A | 1R | A | SF | | 1R | 1R | A | A | A | A | 0 / 8 |
| Wimbledon | A | 1R | 3R | 2R | 2R | A | A | 2R | 4R | 4R | QF | | 3R | 2R | 4R | 1R | A | A | 0 / 12 |
| US Open | A | A | 1R | A | 2R | 1R | 3R | A | 2R | 1R | 2R | | 1R | 1R | A | 1R | 1R | A | 0 / 11 |
| Strike rate | 0 / 1 | 0 / 2 | 0 / 4 | 0 / 3 | 0 / 4 | 0 / 1 | 0 / 3 | 0 / 2 | 0 / 4 | 0 / 3 | 0 / 5 | | 0 / 4 | 0 / 4 | 0 / 2 | 0 / 3 | 0 / 2 | 0 / 1 | 0 / 48 |

Note: The Australian Open was held twice in 1977, in January and December.

== Career finals ==
=== Singles: 10 (3 titles / 7 runner-ups) ===
| Result | W–L | Date | Tournament | Surface | Opponent | Score |
|---|---|---|---|---|---|---|
| Win | 1–0 | Jan 1971 | Sydney, Australia | Grass | (Australia) John Alexander | 6–3, 6–4, 6–4 |
| Loss | 1–1 | Jan 1974 | Australian Open | Grass | (United States) Jimmy Connors | 6–7^{(7–9)}, 4–6, 6–4, 3–6 |
| Loss | 1–2 | Dec 1974 | Sydney, Australia | Grass | (Australia) Tony Roche | 6–7, 6–4, 6–3, 2–6, 6–8 |
| Loss | 1–3 | Feb 1976 | Fort Worth WCT, U.S. | Hard (i) | (Argentina) Guillermo Vilas | 7–6^{(7–4)}, 1–6, 1–6 |
| Loss | 1–4 | Oct 1976 | Brisbane, Australia | Grass | (Australia) Mark Edmondson | 6–3, 4–6, 4–6, 4–6 |
| Loss | 1–5 | Oct 1976 | Perth, Australia | Carpet | (Australia) Ray Ruffels | 0–6, 6–4, 6–2, 3–6, 2–6 |
| Win | 2–5 | Oct 1979 | Brisbane, Australia | Grass | (Australia) Ross Case | 7–6, 6–2, 6–3 |
| Win | 3–5 | Oct 1979 | Sydney, Australia | Grass | (United States) Hank Pfister | 6–4, 6–4, 7–5 |
| Loss | 3–6 | Feb 1980 | San Juan, Puerto Rico | Hard | (Mexico) Raúl Ramírez | 3–6, 2–6 |
| Loss | 3–7 | Oct 1980 | Brisbane, Australia | Grass | (United States) John McEnroe | 3–6, 4–6 |

=== Doubles: 50 (25 titles / 25 runner-ups) ===
| Result | W–L | Date | Tournament | Surface | Partner | Opponents | Score |
|---|---|---|---|---|---|---|---|
| Loss | 0–1 | Jan 1970 | Australian Open, Melbourne | Grass | (Australia) John Alexander | (United States) Bob Lutz (United States) Stan Smith | 3–6, 6–8, 3–6 |
| Loss | 0–2 | Aug 1970 | Hilversum, Netherlands | Hard | (Australia) John Alexander | (Australia) Bill Bowrey (Australia) Owen Davidson | 3–6, 4–6, 2–6 |
| Win | 1–2 | Aug 1970 | Kitzbühel, Austria | Clay | (Australia) John Alexander | (Socialist Federal Republic of Yugoslavia) Željko Franulović (Czechoslovakia) Jan Kodeš | 10–8, 6–2, 6–4 |
| Win | 2–2 | Jan 1971 | Sydney Outdoor, Australia | Hard | (Australia) John Alexander | (Australia) Mal Anderson (Soviet Union) Alex Metreveli | 6–7, 2–6, 6–3, 7–6, 7–6 |
| Win | 3–2 | Jul 1971 | Gstaad, Switzerland | Clay | (Australia) John Alexander | (Australia) John Newcombe (Netherlands) Tom Okker | 5–7, 6–3, 6–4 |
| Win | 4–2 | Sep 1971 | Los Angeles, U.S. | Hard | (Australia) John Alexander | (United States) Frank Froehling (United States) Clark Graebner | 7–6, 6–4 |
| Loss | 4–3 | Oct 1971 | Vancouver WCT, Canada | Carpet | (Australia) John Alexander | (Australia) Roy Emerson (Australia) Rod Laver | 7–5, 7–6, 0–6, 5–7, 6–7 |
| Loss | 4–4 | Jul 1972 | St. Louis WCT, U.S. | Carpet | (Australia) John Alexander | (Australia) John Newcombe (Australia) Tony Roche | 6–7, 2–6 |
| Win | 5–4 | Jul 1972 | Louisville WCT, U.S. | Clay | (Australia) John Alexander | (United States) Arthur Ashe (United States) Bob Lutz | 6–4, 6–3 |
| Loss | 5–5 | Jan 1973 | Australian Open, Melbourne | Grass | (Australia) John Alexander | (Australia) Mal Anderson (Australia) John Newcombe | 3–6, 4–6, 6–7 |
| Win | 6–5 | Feb 1973 | Toronto WCT, Canada | Carpet | (Australia) John Alexander | (Australia) Roy Emerson (Australia) Rod Laver | 3–6, 6–4, 6–4, 6–2 |
| Loss | 6–6 | Apr 1973 | Brussels WCT, Belgium | Carpet | (Australia) John Alexander | (United States) Bob Lutz (United States) Stan Smith | 4–6, 6–7 |
| Win | 7–6 | Aug 1973 | Cincinnati, U.S. | Clay | (Australia) John Alexander | (United States) Brian Gottfried (Mexico) Raúl Ramírez | 1–6, 7–6, 7–6 |
| Loss | 7–7 | Feb 1974 | Richmond WCT, U.S. | Carpet | (Australia) John Alexander | (Socialist Federal Republic of Yugoslavia) Nikola Pilić (Australia) Allan Stone | 3–6, 6–3, 6–7 |
| Win | 8–7 | Mar 1974 | Miami WCT, U.S. | Hard | (Australia) John Alexander | (Netherlands) Tom Okker (United States) Marty Riessen | 4–6, 6–4, 7–5 |
| Win | 9–7 | Apr 1974 | Monte Carlo WCT, Monaco | Clay | (Australia) John Alexander | (Spain) Manuel Orantes (Australia) Tony Roche | 7–6, 4–6, 7–6, 6–3 |
| Win | 10–7 | Jan 1975 | Australian Open, Melbourne | Grass | (Australia) John Alexander | (Australia) Bob Carmichael (Australia) Allan Stone | 6–3, 7–6 |
| Loss | 10–8 | Feb 1975 | Fort Worth WCT, U.S. | Hard | (Australia) John Alexander | (United States) Bob Lutz (United States) Stan Smith | 7–6, 6–7, 3–6 |
| Win | 11–8 | Mar 1975 | San Antonio WCT, U.S. | Hard | (Australia) John Alexander | (United Kingdom) Mark Cox (South Africa) Cliff Drysdale | 7–6, 4–6, 6–4 |
| Loss | 11–9 | Apr 1975 | Tokyo Indoor, Japan | Carpet | (Australia) John Alexander | (United States) Bob Lutz (United States) Stan Smith | 4–6, 7–6, 2–6 |
| Win | 12–9 | May 1975 | Las Vegas, U.S. | Hard | (Australia) John Alexander | (Australia) Bob Carmichael (South Africa) Cliff Drysdale | 6–1, 6–4 |
| Loss | 12–10 | Jun 1975 | French Open, Paris | Clay | (Australia) John Alexander | (United States) Brian Gottfried (Mexico) Raúl Ramírez | 4–6, 6–2, 2–6, 4–6 |
| Win | 13–10 | Jul 1975 | Chicago, U.S. | Carpet | (Australia) John Alexander | (United States) Mike Cahill (United States) John Whitlinger | 6–3, 6–4 |
| Win | 14–10 | Aug 1975 | Cincinnati, U.S. | Hard | (South Africa) Cliff Drysdale | (Mexico) Marcelo Lara (Mexico) Joaquín Loyo-Mayo | 7–6, 6–4 |
| Loss | 14–11 | Aug 1975 | North Conway, U.S. | Clay | (Australia) John Alexander | (Pakistan) Haroon Rahim (United States) Erik van Dillen | 6–7, 6–7 |
| Win | 15–11 | Jan 1976 | Atlanta WCT, U.S. | Carpet | (Australia) John Alexander | (Poland) Wojtek Fibak (West Germany) Karl Meiler | 6–3, 6–4 |
| Loss | 15–12 | Feb 1976 | St. Louis WCT, U.S. | Carpet | (Australia) John Alexander | (United States) Brian Gottfried (Mexico) Raúl Ramírez | 4–6, 2–6 |
| Win | 16–12 | Apr 1976 | Denver WCT, U.S. | Carpet | (Australia) John Alexander | (United States) Jimmy Connors (United States) Billy Martin | 6–7, 6–2, 7–5 |
| Loss | 16–13 | Sep 1976 | Woodlands Doubles, Texas | Hard | (Australia) Allan Stone | (United States) Brian Gottfried (Mexico) Raúl Ramírez | 1–6, 4–6, 7–5, 6–7 |
| Loss | 16–14 | Apr 1977 | Jackson, U.S. | Carpet | (Australia) Ken Rosewall | (South Africa) Bob Hewitt (South Africa) Frew McMillan | 2–6, 6–7 |
| Loss | 16–15 | Apr 1977 | Houston WCT, U.S. | Hard | (Australia) John Alexander | (Romania) Ilie Năstase (Italy) Adriano Panatta | 3–6, 4–6 |
| Loss | 16–16 | May 1977 | Hamburg, Germany | Clay | (Australia) Kim Warwick | (South Africa) Bob Hewitt (West Germany) Karl Meiler | 6–3, 3–6, 4–6, 4–6 |
| Loss | 16–17 | Jul 1977 | Wimbledon, London | Grass | (Australia) John Alexander | (Australia) Ross Case (Australia) Geoff Masters | 3–6, 4–6, 6–3, 9–8, 4–6 |
| Win | 17–17 | Aug 1977 | Cincinnati, U.S. | Clay | (Australia) John Alexander | (South Africa) Bob Hewitt (United States) Roscoe Tanner | 6–3, 7–6 |
| Win | 18–17 | Jul 1977 | Washington, D.C., U.S. | Clay | (Australia) John Alexander | (United States) Fred McNair (United States) Sherwood Stewart | 7–5, 7–5 |
| Win | 19–17 | Aug 1977 | Louisville, U.S. | Clay | (Australia) John Alexander | (Australia) Chris Kachel (Australia) Cliff Letcher | 6–1, 6–4 |
| Loss | 19–18 | Dec 1977 | Adelaide, Australia | Grass | (Australia) John Alexander | (Australia) Syd Ball (Australia) Kim Warwick | 6–3, 6–7, 4–6 |
| Win | 20–18 | Dec 1977 | Sydney Outdoor, Australia | Grass | (Australia) John Alexander | (Australia) Ray Ruffels (Australia) Allan Stone | 7–6, 2–6, 6–3 |
| Loss | 20–19 | Dec 1977 | Australian Open, Melbourne | Grass | (Australia) John Alexander | (Australia) Ray Ruffels (Australia) Allan Stone | 6–7, 6–7 |
| Loss | 20–20 | Mar 1978 | Memphis, U.S. | Carpet | (Australia) John Newcombe | (United States) Brian Gottfried (Mexico) Raúl Ramírez | 6–3, 6–7, 2–6 |
| Win | 21–20 | Jul 1978 | Forest Hills WCT, U.S. | Clay | (Australia) John Alexander | (United States) Fred McNair (United States) Sherwood Stewart | 7–6, 7–6 |
| Win | 22–20 | Sep 1978 | Los Angeles, U.S. | Carpet | (Australia) John Alexander | (United States) Fred McNair (Mexico) Raúl Ramírez | 6–3, 7–6 |
| Win | 23–20 | Oct 1978 | Brisbane, Australia | Grass | (Australia) John Alexander | (Australia) Syd Ball (Australia) Allan Stone | 6–3, 7–6 |
| Win | 24–20 | Jan 1979 | Hobart, Australia | Grass | (Australia) Bob Giltinan | (Romania) Ion Țiriac (Argentina) Guillermo Vilas | 8–6 |
| Loss | 24–21 | Apr 1979 | Dayton, U.S. | Carpet | (Australia) Ross Case | (South Africa) Cliff Drysdale (United States) Bruce Manson | 6–3, 3–6, 6–7 |
| Loss | 24–22 | Jun 1979 | French Open, Paris | Clay | (Australia) Ross Case | (United States) Gene Mayer (United States) Sandy Mayer | 4–6, 4–6, 4–6 |
| Loss | 24–23 | Dec 1979 | Adelaide, Australia | Grass | (Australia) John Alexander | (Australia) Colin Dibley (Australia) Chris Kachel | 7–6, 6–7, 4–6 |
| Loss | 24–24 | Oct 1980 | Brisbane, Australia | Grass | (Australia) Rod Frawley | (United States) John McEnroe (United States) Matt Mitchell | 6–8 |
| Win | 25–24 | Jan 1982 | Guarujá, Brazil | Clay | (Australia) Kim Warwick | (Brazil) Carlos Kirmayr (Brazil) Cássio Motta | 6–7, 6–2, 6–3 |
| Loss | 25–25 | Feb 1982 | Denver, U.S. | Carpet | (Australia) Kim Warwick | (South Africa) Kevin Curren (United States) Steve Denton | 4–6, 4–6 |

Source: ATP
