= Carlo Borea =

Italian tennis player

- Country (sports): Italy
- Born: 24 March 1954 (age 70)

Singles
- Career record: 0–2
- Career titles: 0

Grand Slam singles results
- Australian Open: –
- French Open: Q4 (1975)
- Wimbledon: –
- US Open: –

Doubles
- Career record: 1–2
- Career titles: 0

Grand Slam doubles results
- Australian Open: –
- French Open: –
- Wimbledon: –
- US Open: –
Medal record
Mediterranean Games
Gold medal – first place	1975 Algiers	Doubles
Bronze medal – third place	1975 Algiers	Singles
- Last updated on: 16 August 2016.

Carlo Borea (born 24 March 1954) is an Italian retired professional tennis player who won two medals at the 1975 Mediterranean Games.
