= Salvador Cabeza =

Spanish tennis player

- Country (sports): Spain

Singles
- Career record: 1–6
- Highest ranking: No. 245 (6 Nov 1974)

Grand Slam singles results
- Wimbledon: Q1 (1975)

Doubles
- Career record: 0–3

Salvador Cabeza is a Spanish former professional tennis player.

Active on tour in the 1970s, Cabeza was a junior Sunshine Cup representative for Spain and a two-time winner of the Copa Sevilla. His best performance in a Grand Prix tournament came at the 1974 Madrid Open, where he had a win over world number 48 Vijay Amritraj, before falling to Vijay's brother Anand in the third round.
