= Gerhard Wimmer =

Austrian tennis player

- Country (sports): Austria
- Born: 1 March 1953 (age 72) Bischofshofen, Austria

Singles
- Career record: 4–7
- Highest ranking: No. 206 (8 April 1975)

Grand Slam singles results
- Australian Open: 1R (1976)

Doubles
- Career record: 3–7

Grand Slam doubles results
- Australian Open: 1R (1976)

Gerhard Wimmer (born 1 March 1953) is an Austrian former professional tennis player.

A native of Bischofshofen in Salzburg, Wimmer appeared in two Davis Cup ties for Austria, against Monaco in 1973 and Great Britain in 1975. His only win came in a doubles rubber, over Monegasque opponents. In the tie against Great Britain one of his losses was to Roger Taylor in five sets.

Wimmer featured in the singles and doubles main draws at the 1976 Australian Open.

His younger brother, Ingo Wimmer, also played for the Austria Davis Cup team.

== See also ==
- List of Austria Davis Cup team representatives
