= Vicki Lancaster-Kerr =

Australian tennis player

- Country (sports): Australia
- Born: 26 January 1951 (age 75)

Singles

Grand Slam singles results
- Australian Open: 2R (1970, 1975)
- Wimbledon: 1R (1971, 1972, 1976)
- US Open: Q2 (1977)

Doubles

Grand Slam doubles results
- Australian Open: 2R (1970, 1974, 1975)
- Wimbledon: 1R (1972)
- US Open: 3R (1976)

Grand Slam mixed doubles results
- Wimbledon: 1R (1972)

Vicki Lancaster-Kerr (born 26 January 1951) is an Australian former professional tennis player.

Lancaster-Kerr was an Australian Open junior doubles champion (with Lesley Hunt in 1968) and competed on the professional tour during the 1970s. Her two appearances in the women's singles second round at the Australian Open included a three set loss to eventual semi-finalist Sue Barker in 1975. She played collegiate tennis for Midland College in the Texas city of Midland, where she still resides.
