= Kaye Hallam =

Australian tennis player

- Country (sports): Australia
- Born: 24 March 1957 (age 67)

Singles

Grand Slam singles results
- Australian Open: 2R (1977 Dec)
- French Open: Q2 (1977)
- US Open: Q1 (1978)

Doubles

Grand Slam doubles results
- Australian Open: QF (1976)
- Wimbledon: 2R (1979)

Grand Slam mixed doubles results
- Wimbledon: 1R (1976)

Kaye Hallam (born 24 March 1957) is an Australian former professional tennis player.

Hallam grew up in the New South Wales town of Wagga Wagga and competed on the professional tour in the 1970s. She was a doubles quarter-finalist at the 1976 Australian Open, partnering Renee Blount. Her best singles performance was a second round appearance in the December edition of the 1977 Australian Open.
