= Graeme Thomson (tennis) =

Australian tennis player

- Country (sports): Australia
- Born: 1951 (age 73–74); Sydney, Australia

Singles
- Career record: 9-24
- Highest ranking: No. 162 (3 June 1974)

Grand Slam singles results
- Australian Open: 2R (1973, 1974, 1975)
- French Open: 1R (1974)
- Wimbledon: 1R (1973)

Doubles
- Career record: 5-16

Grand Slam doubles results
- Australian Open: 2R (1974, 1975)
- Wimbledon: 1R (1977, 1978)

Graeme Thomson (born 1951) is an Australian former professional tennis player.

Born in Sydney, Thomson was active on tour in the 1970s and had a best singles world ranking of 162. He featured in the second round of the Australian Open on three occasions, including the 1974 tournament when he lost to Jimmy Connors, who went on to win his first grand slam title.

Thomson played Bundesliga tennis for Solingen and married a German. Their son Clinton was a tennis player.
