= 1976 Australian Open =

Tennis Championships

- Date: 26 December 1975 – 4 January 1976
- Edition: 64th
- Category: Grand Slam (ITF)
- Surface: Grass
- Location: Melbourne, Australia
- Venue: Kooyong Lawn Tennis Club

Champions

Men's singles
- (Australia) Mark Edmondson

Women's singles
- (Australia) Evonne Goolagong

Men's doubles
- (Australia) John Newcombe / (Australia) Tony Roche

Women's doubles
- (Australia) Evonne Goolagong / (Australia) Helen Gourlay
- Australian Open

The 1976 Australian Open was a tennis tournament played on outdoor grass courts at the Kooyong Lawn Tennis Club in Melbourne in Australia and was held from 26 December 1975 to 4 January 1976. It was the 64th edition of the Australian Open and the first Grand Slam tournament of the year. The singles titles were won by Australians Mark Edmondson and Evonne Goolagong.

== Seniors ==
=== Men's singles ===
(Australia) Mark Edmondson defeated (Australia) John Newcombe, 6–7, 6–3, 7–6, 6–1

- It was Edmondson's 1st and only career Grand Slam singles title. Edmondson is the lowest ranked player ever to win a Grand Slam event.

=== Women's singles ===
(Australia) Evonne Goolagong defeated (Czechoslovakia) Renáta Tomanová, 6–2, 6–2

- It was Goolagong's 5th career Grand Slam singles title and her 3rd title at the Australian Open.

=== Men's doubles ===
(Australia) John Newcombe / (Australia) Tony Roche defeated (Australia) Ross Case / (Australia) Geoff Masters, 7–6, 6–4

=== Women's doubles ===
(Australia) Evonne Goolagong / (Australia) Helen Gourlay defeated (Australia) Lesley Turner Bowrey / (Czechoslovakia) Renáta Tomanová, 8–1

• It was Goolagong's 5th career Grand Slam doubles title and her 4th title at the Australian Open.
• It was Gourlay's 2nd career Grand Slam doubles title and her 2nd title at the Australian Open.

=== Mixed doubles ===
No competition between 1970 and 1986.

Preceded by 1975 US Open	Grand Slams	Succeeded by 1976 French Open
