= 1975 Australian Open =

- Date: 21 December 1974 – 1 January 1975
- Edition: 63rd
- Category: Grand Slam (ITF)
- Surface: Grass
- Location: Melbourne, Australia
- Venue: Kooyong Lawn Tennis Club

Champions

Men's singles
- (Australia) John Newcombe

Women's singles
- (Australia) Evonne Goolagong

Men's doubles
- (Australia) John Alexander / (Australia) Phil Dent

Women's doubles
- (Australia) Evonne Goolagong / (United States) Peggy Michel
- Australian Open

The 1975 Australian Open was a tennis tournament played on outdoor grass courts at the Kooyong Lawn Tennis Club in Melbourne in Australia and was held from 21 December 1974 to 1 January 1975. It was the 63rd edition of the Australian Open and the first Grand Slam tournament of the year. The singles titles were won by Australians John Newcombe and Evonne Goolagong.

== Seniors ==
=== Men's singles ===
(Australia) John Newcombe defeated (United States) Jimmy Connors, 7–5, 3–6, 6–4, 7–6^{(9–7)}

• It was Newcombe's 7th and last career Grand Slam singles title and his 2nd title at the Australian Open.

=== Women's singles ===
(Australia) Evonne Goolagong defeated (Czechoslovakia) Martina Navratilova, 6–3, 6–2

• It was Goolagong Cawley's 4th career Grand Slam singles title and her 2nd title at the Australian Open.

=== Men's doubles ===
(Australia) John Alexander / (Australia) Philip Dent defeated (Australia) Bob Carmichael / (Australia) Allan Stone, 6–3, 7–6

• It was Alexander's 1st career Grand Slam doubles title.
• It was Dent's 1st and only career Grand Slam doubles title.

=== Women's doubles ===
(Australia) Evonne Goolagong / (United States) Peggy Michel defeated (Soviet Union) Olga Morozova / (Australia) Margaret Court, 7–6, 7–6

• It was Goolagong 4th career Grand Slam doubles title and her 3rd title at the Australian Open.
• It was Michel's 3rd and last career Grand Slam doubles title and her 2nd title at the Australian Open.

=== Mixed doubles ===
No competition between 1970 and 1986.

Preceded by 1974 US Open	Grand Slams	Succeeded by 1975 French Open
