= Christine Matison =

Australian tennis player

- Country (sports): Australia
- Born: 29 October 1951 (age 73)

Singles
- Career record: -

Grand Slam singles results
- Australian Open: SF (1978)
- French Open: 1R (1974, 1976)
- Wimbledon: 2R (1974, 1977)

Doubles
- Career record: -

Grand Slam doubles results
- Australian Open: SF (1977, 1978)
- French Open: QF (1977)
- Wimbledon: 3R (1977)
- US Open: 3R (1977)

Christine Matison (born 29 October 1951) is an Australian former professional tennis player who reached the semi-finals of the 1978 Australian Open as a qualifier.

Matison was the first woman qualifier to reach the semifinals of a Grand Slam tournament. The next woman qualifier to do so was Alexandra Stevenson in the 1999 Wimbledon Championships.

In 1975, Matison won the doubles of the Western Australian Championships in Perth partnering Lesley Turner Bowrey, beating Sue Barker and Michelle Tyler-Wilson in the final. In 1983, she won the singles titles at the final edition of the Western Australian Hard Court Open Championships in Wongan Hills.
